= Payaso =

- Official movie poster
- Directed by: Celso Ad. Castillo
- Written by: Celso Ad. Castillo
- Produced by: Sixto Dy
- Starring: German Moreno
- Cinematography: Romy Vitug
- Edited by: Abelardo Hulleza
- Music by: Vehnee Saturno
- Production company: Sialina Film Enterprises
- Release date: December 25, 1986
- Country: Philippines
- Language: Filipino

Payaso (transl. Jester/Clown) is a 1986 Philippine comedy drama film written and directed by Celso Ad Castillo. The film stars German Moreno as the titular character.

Produced by Sialina Film Enterprises, the film was theatrically released on December 25, 1986, as one of the official entries for the 12th Metro Manila Film Festival.

== Plot ==
St. Peter sends his jester (German Moreno) to Earth after he lost his heavenly keys. The jester’s quest is to look for the misplaced keys. As he wandered out in the streets, the happy clown found himself in sadness as he sees the depressing situation of poverty and moral degradation of man. His melancholy worsened after he met the Red Devil who has supernatural powers that he couldn’t even compete with. Depressed, hopeless and defeated, he asks his master to help him and make its presence known to him once more.

== Cast ==
- German Moreno as Payaso
- Gene Palomo as Red Devil
- Monique Castillo
- Strawberry
- Cris Castillo
- Bong Agustin
- Jograd de la Torre
- Mon Alvir
- Gary Lising
- Julie Ann Javier
- Troy Castillo
- Dino Castillo
- Darling Sumayao
- Ruthie Ann Talplacido
- Marife Montilla
- Divine Grace Gallardo
- Jaycee Castillo
- Dave Bronson Tolentino
- Myra Rigs Rinion
- Wynette Bernardo
- Arrizon Matienzo
- Dania De Jesus

=== Special participation ===
- Freddie Aguilar
- Jestoni Alarcon
- Steve Alcarado
- Jojo Alejar
- Max Alvarado
- Bing Angeles
- Lito Anzures
- Nora Aunor
- Noel 'Ungga' Ayala
- Babalu
- Inday Badiday
- Maribeth Bichara
- Amay Bisaya
- Cachupoy
- Chiquito
- Ramon Christopher
- Angel Confiado
- Sheryl Cruz
- Edmund Cupcupin
- Richie D'Horsie
- Ramon D'Salva
- Cris Daluz
- Ricky Davao
- Nonong de Andres
- Janice de Belen
- Joseph de Cordova
- Nonoy De Guzman
- Joey de Leon
- Paquito Diaz
- Romy Diaz
- Dolphy
- George Estregan
- Joaquin Fajardo
- Pilita Corrales
- Pops Fernandez
- Rudy Fernandez
- Florante
- Freida Fonda
- Joonee Gamboa
- Eddie Garcia
- Boboy Garrovillo
- Janno Gibbs
- Eddie Gicoso
- Eddie Gutierrez
- Mike Hanopol
- Tatlong Itlog
- Allan K
- Sammy Lagmay
- Lito Lapid
- Michael Locsin
- Ike Lozada
- Lollie Mara
- Bert Marcelo
- Leo Martinez
- William Martinez
- Yoyong Martirez
- Eddie Mediavillo
- Rocco Montalban
- Jovit Moya
- Arlene Muhlach
- Nello Nayo
- Martin Nievera
- Lourdes Nuque
- Bert Olivar
- Bobby Ongleo
- Torling Pader
- Dencio Padilla
- Zsa Zsa Padilla
- Palito
- Panchito
- Tina Paner
- Don Pepot
- Fernando Poe Jr.
- Pugak
- Rico J. Puno
- Tiya Pusit
- Rene Requiestas
- Ramon "Bong" Revilla, Jr.
- Ramon Revilla
- The Reycards Duet
- Manilyn Reynes
- Ronnie Ricketts
- Spanky Rigor
- Susan Roces
- Eddie Rodriguez
- Miguel Rodriguez
- Ruby Rodriguez
- Gloria Romero
- Jose Romulo
- Ruben Rustia
- Leopoldo Salcedo
- Paquito Salcedo
- Eddie Samonte
- Sampaguita
- Jimmy Santos
- Rusty Santos
- Vilma Santos
- Snooky Serna
- Maricel Soriano
- Tito Sotto
- Val Sotto
- Vic Sotto
- Boy Sta. Maria
- Mely Tagasa
- Robert Talby
- Ang Tatlong Pinoy
- Tintoy
- Tessie Tomas
- Rey Tomenes
- Soxy Topacio
- Tugak
- Gary Valenciano
- Helen Vela
- Lou Veloso
- Ronnel Victor
- Nova Villa
- Ivy Violan
- Pablo Virtuoso
- Redford White
- Ramon Zamora
- Jose Mari Chan
- Bibeth Orteza
- Efren Reyes

== Production ==
- Nelson Bartolome (line producer)
- Angelina C. Dy (executive producer)
- Sixto Dy (executive producer)
- Vehnee Saturno (musical arrangement)

== Awards ==
Payaso was the only film that won an award at the 1986 Metro Manila Film Festival aside from the actors and actresses. The movie bagged the Best Cinematography Award for the said year. No awards were given for the Best Story and Best Screenplay categories.
