= Keempee de Leon =

Filipino actor, singer, comedian and TV host (born 1973)

- Born: Joseph Joachim Tugas de Leon; January 8, 1973 (age 53); Manila, Philippines
- Occupations: Actor, comedian, singer, songwriter, television host
- Years active: 1988–present
- Agents: Viva Artists Agency (1989, 1992–1997) Regal Films (1990–1992); APT Entertainment
- Television: Radio Philippines Network; Intercontinental Broadcasting Corporation; ABS-CBN; GMA Network; TV5 Network
- Parent(s): Joey de Leon (father); Daria Ramirez (mother)

Joseph Joachim "Keempee" Tugas de Leon (born January 8, 1973) is a Filipino actor, comedian, singer, songwriter and TV host. He is the son of Joey de Leon and Daria Ramirez.

== Career ==
He started his career in the entertainment industry in 1988 via the Viva Films film I Love You 3x a Day, where he was paired with Gelli de Belen and worked with soon-to-be-co-host of Eat Bulaga!, Jimmy Santos. Soon after, he became a regular fixture in three TV shows: Eat Bulaga!, That's Entertainment and Agila.

In April 1989, he signed his first recording contract with OctoArts International (now PolyEast Records).

In 1990, he was a subject of a tug-of-war between Regal Films and Viva Films when Regal got Keempee to appear as lead role in the romantic comedy movie Romeo Loves Juliet opposite Aiko Melendez. In the end, Keempee chose to remain with Viva Films and signed a contract. In 1992, he was launched as a junior action star via the movie Jesus dela Cruz at ang mga Batang Riles with Ana Roces as his leading lady. The action film was a mild success and it was followed up with Blue Jeans Gang with Dennis Padilla and Leah Orosa as co-stars. However, unlike Batang Riles, Blue Jeans Gang was a flop at the box-office.

De Leon openly admitted to the public in 1993 that he became a victim of drug abuse and as a result, he underwent rehabilitation at New Beginnings in Sucat, Parañaque. Despite this however, he managed to finish two big movies before he went on sabbatical. The two big movies were: Viva's Sana'y Ikaw na Nga with Christopher de Leon and Vina Morales, and Alyas Batman en Robin with dad Joey de Leon. After his rehabilitation, he became a member of Victory Christian Fellowship while resuming his stalled showbiz career in 1994.

He had his biggest break on TV by playing a leading role in GMA's Villa Quintana with Donna Cruz as his leading lady. He is a former VIVA contract star along with other members of That's Entertainment with Donna Cruz, Jessa Zaragosa, Vina Morales and others. He became Best Drama Actor for Villa Quintana in Star Awards for television. He was also a co-host in GMA Supershow from 1995 to 1997 and a gag performer in IBC 13's Goin' Bayabas, a remake of the '80s gag show Goin' Bananas in 1998.

In 2002, after he graduated and finished his studies in college, he returned to the small screen via ABS-CBN's Klasmeyts and Recuerdo de Amor, but in 2004, he returned to GMA Network where he was signed up to portray the gay Harold in Bahay Mo Ba 'To?. In the sitcom he was paired with Francine Prieto. Their tandem became a hit and he continued playing gay roles in the reality sitcom Kung Ako Ikaw and in films.

In 2008, De Leon returned to primetime via LaLola which stars Rhian Ramos and JC de Vera. He also returned to comedy film for his comeback movie, Iskul Bukol: 20 Years After, an official entry to the 2008 Metro Manila Film Festival, together with Tito Sotto, Vic Sotto and his father, Joey De Leon. After LaLola, he plays Paul in the Philippine remake of Korean drama All About Eve. The following year, he became part of another Korean remake drama Full House, which stars Heart Evangelista and Richard Gutierrez. Keempee co-hosts a singing competition Are You The Next Big Star? where he works with famous singer, Regine Velasquez.

In 2013, he appeared in the TV series My Husband's Lover where he portrayed Zandro Soriano. Netizens laud Keempee for Zandro role in My Husband's Lover. In the series, Zandro is the cross dresser cousin of Vincent Tom Rodriguez, who is a closet bisexual at this point in the story. Zandro's and Vincent's dads are both "allergic" to having gay members in the family but Vincent's father, Gen. Armando Soriano, a retired general, is more vocal – and violent – with regard to the issue.

In March 2016, he was expelled from Eat Bulaga! after 14 years of hosting. However, he stayed with GMA Network from 2015 to 2018 as he appeared on the network's different soap operas. His most notable latest works were Little Nanay, where he got to work for the first time with the Superstar Nora Aunor; and Meant to Be where he worked for the first time with former That's Entertainment cast members, most notably Manilyn Reynes and Janno Gibbs.

In 2018, he transferred back to ABS-CBN where he reunited with erstwhile girlfriend Cristine Reyes in the drama Nang Ngumiti ang Langit in 2019. In 2020, De Leon became part of the drama series, Bagong Umaga with co-stars former PBB housemates Heaven Peralejo and Barbie Imperial.

== Keempee's hairstyle ==
Keempee de Leon sported a curtain haircut in the 1990s that was imitated by other actors and young men at the time. Named after him, the 'Keempee' is parted in the middle of the head and, with bangs reach as far as the ears; the hairstyle became strongly associated with him and his fellow actors who sported the hairstyle during that decade.

== Personal life ==
De Leon has a child named Samantha with his former girlfriend. His past relationships were Manilyn Reynes, Carmina Villarroel, Vina Morales, Ara Mina, Jessa Zaragoza, Bernadette Allyson, Angelika Dela Cruz and Pauleen Luna. In an interview, De Leon reveals that Ina Raymundo and G. Toengi were his ex-girlfriends also.

De Leon is a part owner of two restaurants, Locavore and Kermit Manila. Locavore is located in Bonifacio Global City while Kermit Manila is in Poblacion, Makati.

== Discography ==
Title	Album details
Keempee de Leon	Released: 1991; Label: OctoArts Records
Better Believe It	Released: 1996; Label: OctoArts Records; Formats: CD, Digital Download

=== Also featured on ===
Title	Album details
OctoArts All Stars – Pasko Para Sa Lahat	Released: 1990; Label: OctoArts Records
Voices	Released: 1995; Label: PolyEast Records
Homegroan	Released: 1999; Label: PolyEast Records
Awit Mula sa Puso	Released: 2000; Label: PolyEast Records

== Filmography ==
=== Film ===
Year	Title	Role	Notes
1985	Mama Said, Papa Said I Love You	Himself	
1988	I Love You 3x a Day	Tomas Cruz	
1989	Ang Lahat ng Ito Pati Na ang Langit	Kenneth	
1989	SuperMouse and the Robo-Rats		cameo
1989	Aso't Pusa	Edong	
1989	Romeo Loves Juliet (But Their Families Hate Each Other)	Romeo	
1990	Tootsie-Wootsie: Ang Bandang Walang Atrasan	Dick	
1990	Titser's Enemi No. 1	Junjun	
1990	Tangga and Chos: Beauty Secret Agents		
1990	Petrang Kabayo 2: Anong Ganda Mo! Mukha Kang Kabayo	Sylverster	
1990	Love at First Sight		
1991	Humanap Ka ng Panget	Elvin	
1991	Angelito San Miguel: Ang Batang City Jail	Banjo	
1991	Alyas Batman en Robin	Kevin / Robin	
1992	Miss Na Miss Kita (Utol Kong hoodlum II)		cameo
1992	Jesus dela Cruz at ang Mga Batang Riles	Jess	
1992	Blue Jeans Gang	Brian	
1993	Sana'y Ikaw Na Nga	Gary	
1993	Gagay ang Prinsesa ng Brownout	Jesus Dela Cruz	cameo
1994	Pintsik	Benjie	
1994	Cuadro de Jack	Jericho	
1995	Barkada Walang Atrasan	Jojo	
1995	Okey si Maam	Jess	
1995	Love Notes the Movie	Norman	
1997	The Sarah Balabagan Story		
1997	Nag-iisang Ikaw	Aaron Buenaventura	
1997	Ten Little Indians		
2001	Bahay ni Lola	Bob	
2003	Message Sent	Delfin	
2005	Happily Ever After	Pampee	
2005	Lovestruck	Oscar	
2005	Ispiritista: Itay, May Moomoo	Ghost	cameo
2006	Shake, Rattle and Roll 8	Cesar	
2008	Iskul Bukol 20 Years After: The Ungasis and Escaleras Adventure	Wimpee	
2021	Yorme: The Isko Domagoso Story	John Nite	cameo
2022	Mahal Kita, Beksman	Jamie Salvador	
2023	Here Comes the Groom	Rodrigo Sr.	Main role, 1st Summer Metro Manila Film Festival Entry

=== Television ===
Year	Title	Role
2026	Delivery Boi	Paeng Maniego
2025	Prinsesa ng City Jail	Diosdado "Dado" Pascual
2022	2 Good 2 Be True	Jay/Joey Fajardo
2022	Dear Uge	
2021	It's Showtime	Himself/Hide and Sing Mystery Celebrity Singer
2020	Bagong Umaga	Joselito "Jose" Magbanua
2019	Magandang Buhay	Himself/Guest
2019	Tonight with Boy Abunda	Himself/Guest
2019	It's Showtime	Himself/Guest KapareWHO/Mr. Q & A Hurado
2019	Nang Ngumiti ang Langit	Benjie Dimagmaliw
2019	Dok Ricky, Pedia	
2018	Home Sweetie Home	Steven
2018	Inday Will Always Love You	Joaquin
2018	Wagas: Matandang Dalaga No More	Lani
2018	Tonight with Arnold Clavio	Himself/Guest
2018	MARS	Himself/Guest
2017	All Star Videoke	Himself/Guest
2017	Meant to Be	Wilton "Pawie" Bendiola
2017	Dear Uge: Aso't Pusa	Henry
2016	Lip Sync Battle Philippines	
2016	Pepito Manaloto: Stepmom	Raymond
2015	Little Nanay	Edgar San Pedro
2015	Pepito Manaloto: Rainbow	Raymond
2015	Sabado Badoo	
2015	Sunday All Stars	Himself/Guest Performer
2015	Biro Ng Kapalaran: Eat Bulaga Lenten Drama Special	Rocky
2015	Once Upon a Kiss	Jimmy Rodrigo
2014	The Ryzza Mae Show	Himself/Guest
2014	Kulungan Kanlungan: Eat Bulaga Lenten Drama Special	Ebber
2013	Magpakailanman: Ang Tatay Kong Beki	Ruben Marasigan
2013	My Husband's Lover	Zandro Soriano
2013	Toda Max	Wella
2012	Video Incredible	
2011	Iskul Bukol: Kuwelang Kwela 'To	Wacky Roque
2011	Lucky Numbers	Himself/Host
2010	My Driver Sweet Lover	Von
2010	Lady Dada	Macario/Kylie
2010	Comedy Bar	Himself/Guest
2009	Full House	Mr. H
2009	Are You the Next Big Star?	Himself/Co-host
2009	All About Eve	Paul
2008	LaLola	Josano "Gary" Therico Jose/Grace/Narrator
2008	Celebrity Duets: Philippine Edition 2	Himself/Joey Marquez Duet Partner
2008	GoBingo	Himself/Guest Player
2008	Whammy! Push Your Luck	Himself/Contestant
2008	SOP Rules	Himself/Guest Performer
2007	Kung Ako Ikaw	Himself/Host/Harold
2007	Bubble Gang	Himself/Various
2007	Sa Iyong Paglaya: Eat Bulaga Lenten Special	Monchit
2007	Ful Haus	
2007	Sabi Ni Nanay	Various
2007	Nuts Entertainment	Occasional Cast Member
2007	Fantastic Man	Budol
2006	Ay, Robot!	Tintoy
2006	Extra Challenge	Himself
2006	SiS	Himself/Guest
2006	Magpakailanman: Joey de Leon Story	Young Joey de Leon
2006	Kakabaka-Boo	Various
2006	Mama: Eat Bulaga Lenten Drama Special	Julio
2006	Ang sarap ng Paskong Kapuso: The GMA Christmas Special	Harold
2005	Tahanan: Eat Bulaga Lenten Drama Special	Jack
2005	Bongga Ka Star	Host/Harold
2005	Kakabakaba Adventures	Various
2005	Maynila	
2005	Love to Love	Jason Patrick/Patricia
2004–2007	Bahay Mo Ba 'To?	Harold Manguluntoy
2004	Kung Mamahalin Mo Lang Ako	Alfonse
2004	Magpakailanman: Instant Millionaire	
2004	Daisy Siete	
2004	O-Ha!	Various
2003	MMK: The Rene Requestas Story	
2003	Recuerdo de Amor	Ricardo "Carding" Castillo
2002	Klasmeyts	Host/Himself
2001	Hayop Na Hayop	Various
2001	Maalaala Mo Kaya: Birth Certificate	Raymond
2000	Maalaala Mo Kaya: Apples, Oranges and Bananas	Raffy
2000	Relaks Lang	Various
2000	Kagat ng Dilim	Various
1999–2002	Ang Munting Paraiso	
1999	Maalaala Mo Kaya: Tula	
1998	Wow!	Himself/Host
1998	Back To Iskul Bukol	Various
1998	Que Horror	Various
1998	Lihim Ng Gabi	Various
1998	Walang Kukurap	Various
1998	Campus Romance	Various
1997	Goin' Bayabas	Gag Performer
1994–1997	Villa Quintana	Isagani Samonte
1996	GMA Supershow	Himself/Co-Host
1996	GMA Telesine Specials (Sugat ng Inakay)	JB
1996	Tropang Trumpo	
1996	Palibhasa Lalake	Various
1996	Mana	Nida Blanca's son
1996	The Sharon Cuneta Show	Himself/Guest
1996	1896	
1995	Love Notes The Series	
1995	GMA Telesine Specials (Nasaan si Mr. Perfect?)	Karlo
1994	17 Bernard Club	
1993	Maalaala Mo Kaya: Christmas Card	Roldan
1992	Purungtong	
1992	Buddy En Sol	
1992	Mana-Mana	
1991	Maalaala Mo Kaya: Sanggol	
1991	Cebu	
1990	Ang Tabi Kong Mamaw	
1990	Pandakekoks	Pilo
1989	The Sharon Cuneta Show	Himself/Guest
1989	That's Entertainment	Himself/Co-Host, Thursday Group
1989	Lovingly Yours	
1989	Lucky	Jake
1989	Young Love, Sweet Love	Various
1989–1997; 2004–2016	Eat Bulaga!	Himself/Host
1988	Agila	Bobet

=== Television specials ===
- That's Entertainment Anniversary Special
- Kapamilya: ABS-CBN at 50 TV Special
- Eat Bulaga Silver Special
- GMA at 55: The GMA Anniversary Special
- Dolphy Alay Tawa: A Musical Tribute to the King of Philippine Comedy
- Tribute to the Master Showman Kuya Germs

== Awards and nominations ==
Year	Critics	Category	TV Show / Program	Status
1991	5th PMPC Star Awards for Television	Best Drama Actor	Agila	Nominated
1995	PMPC Star Awards for Television	Best Drama Actor	Villa Quintana	Won
1996	PMPC Star Awards for Television	Best Drama Actor	Villa Quintana	Won
2005	19th PMPC Star Awards for Television	Best Comedy Actor	Bahay Mo Ba 'To	Won
2005	2nd Golden Screen Awards	Outstanding Supporting Actor in a Comedy Series	Bahay Mo Ba 'To	Won
2006	20th PMPC Star Awards for Television	Best Comedy Actor	Bahay Mo Ba 'To	Nominated
2006	Asian TV Awards	Best Comedy Performance by an Actor	Bahay Mo Ba 'To	Highly Commended
2007	21st PMPC Star Awards for Television	Best Comedy Actor	Bahay Mo Ba 'To	Nominated
2008	22nd PMPC Star Awards for Television	Best Reality Competition Program Host	Kung Ako Ikaw	Nominated
2013	27th PMPC Star Awards for Television	Best Single Performance by an Actor	(Magpakailanman Presents "Ang Tatay Kong Beki: The Ruben Marasigan Story"; GMA-7)	Nominated
2015	13th Gawad Tanglaw Awards	Best Performance by an Actor by a Single Performance	"Kulungan, Kanlungan" (The Eat Bulaga Lenten Special)	Won
2015	Dabarkads Awards	Best Actor	"Biro ng Kapalaran"	Nominated
2023	First Summer Metro Manila Film Festival (MMFF) 2023	Best Supporting Actor	"Here Comes the Groom"	Won
2024	7th EDDYS 2024	Best Supporting Actor	"Here Comes the Groom"	Nominated
