= Daddy Di Do Du =

Philippine television sitcom series

- Title card
- Genre: Sitcom
- Directed by: Bert de Leon
- Starring: Vic Sotto; Maxene Magalona; Danica Sotto; Isabella de Leon
- Opening theme: "Daddy Di Do Du theme" by Danica Sotto, Maxine Magalona and Isabella de Leon
- Country of origin: Philippines
- Original language: Tagalog

Production
- Camera setup: Multiple-camera setup
- Running time: 42 minutes
- Production company: M-Zet Productions

Original release
- Network: GMA Network
- Release: July 12, 2001 – July 29, 2007

Daddy Di Do Du is a Philippine television sitcom series broadcast by GMA Network. Directed by Bert de Leon, it stars Vic Sotto, Maxene Magalona, Danica Sotto and Isabella de Leon. It premiered on July 12, 2001 on the network's KiliTV line up. The series concluded on July 29, 2007.

== Cast and characters ==
Cast

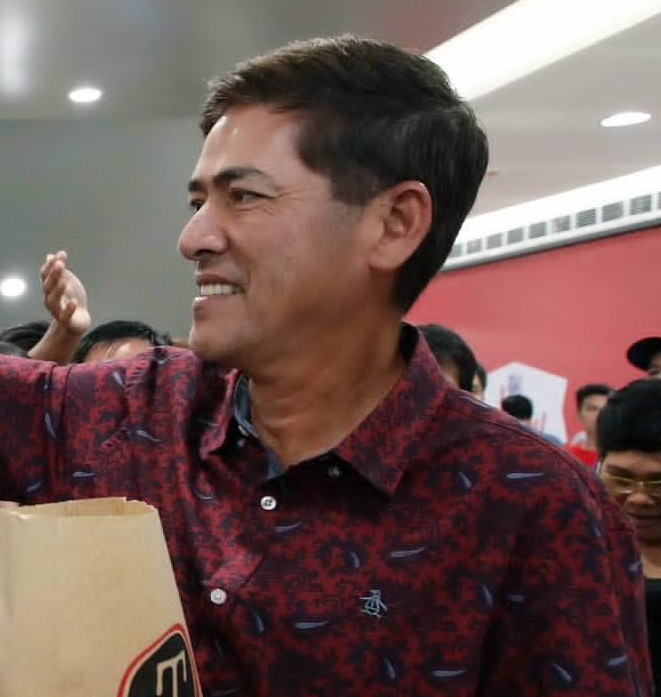
Vic Sotto

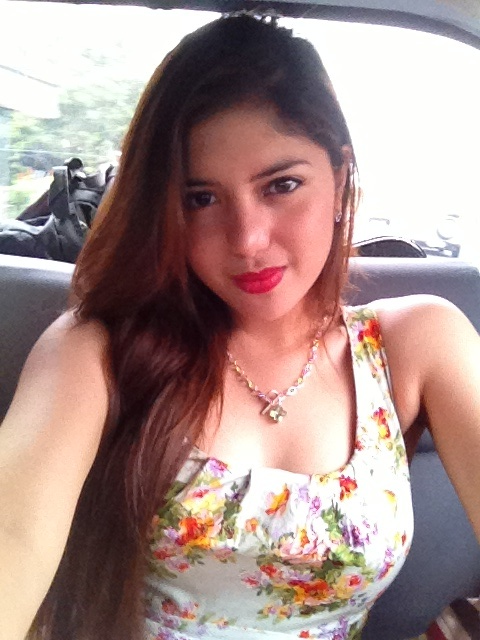
Isabelle de Leon

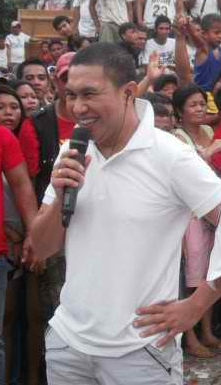
Jose Manalo

Lead cast

- Vic Sotto as Hercules "Kul" Vallejo
- Danica Sotto as Dinna Vallejo
- Maxene Magalona as Donna Vallejo
- Isabella de Leon as Duday Vallejo

Supporting cast

- Cindy Kurleto as Greta
- Redford White as Bruce
- Ruby Rodriguez as Empee "MP"
- Paolo Ballesteros as Paolo
- Joonee Gamboa as Gener
- Jose Manalo as Valentin "Val"
- Sugar Mercado as Sugar
- Rhian Ramos as Aileen
- Nida Blanca as Mammu Groovy
- Russell C. Mon as Ivan
- Stella Ruiz as Lalaine
- Gerard Ramos

== Accolades ==
Accolades received by Daddy Di Do Du
Year	Award	Category	Recipient	Result	Ref.
2001	15th PMPC Star Awards for Television	Best Comedy Actor	Vic Sotto	Nominated	
2002	16th PMPC Star Awards for Television	Best Comedy Show	Daddy Di Do Du	Won	
2003	17th PMPC Star Awards for Television	Best Comedy Show	Daddy Di Do Du	Won	
2005	Golden Screen TV Awards	Outstanding Comedy Series	Daddy Di Do Du	Nominated	
2005	Golden Screen TV Awards	Outstanding Director for a Comedy Series/Comedy Gag Show	Bert de Leon	Nominated	
2007	21st PMPC Star Awards for Television	Best Comedy Show	Daddy Di Do Du	Nominated	
2007	21st PMPC Star Awards for Television	Best Comedy Actor	Vic Sotto	Nominated	
