= Kung Ako Ikaw =

Philippine television reality show

- Title card
- Genre: Reality show
- Directed by: Cesar Cosme; Dominic Zapata
- Presented by: Joey Marquez; Keempee de Leon
- Country of origin: Philippines
- Original language: Tagalog
- No. of episodes: 129

Production
- Camera setup: Multiple-camera setup
- Running time: 30 minutes
- Production company: GMA Entertainment TV

Original release
- Network: GMA Network
- Release: July 16, 2007 – August 14, 2008

Kung Ako Ikaw (transl. if I were you) is a Philippine television reality comedy television show broadcast by GMA Network. Directed by Cesar Cosme and Dominic Zapata, it is hosted by Joey Marquez and Keempee de Leon. It premiered on July 16, 2007 on the network's KiliTV line up. The show concluded on August 14, 2008, with a total of 129 episodes.

== Hosts ==
Keempee de Leon and Joey Marquez reprised their respective roles of Harold (from Bahay Mo Ba 'To?) and Tsong (from Lagot Ka... Isusumbong Kita!) as well as hosting.

== Accolades ==
Accolades received by Kung Ako Ikaw
Year	Award	Category	Recipient	Result	Ref.
2008	22nd PMPC Star Awards for Television	Best Reality Competition Program	Kung Ako Ikaw	Nominated	
2008	22nd PMPC Star Awards for Television	Best Reality Competition Program Host	Keempee de Leon Joey Marquez	Nominated	
