= Ompong Galapong: May Ulo, Walang Tapon =

1988 film starring Dolphy and Redford White

- Directed by: Angel Labra
- Written by: Angel Labra
- Starring: Dolphy; Redford White
- Cinematography: Armando de Guzman
- Edited by: Nap Montebon
- Music by: Rey Valera
- Production company: Horizon Films
- Release date: August 31, 1988
- Country: Philippines
- Language: Filipino

Ompong Galapong: May Ulo, Walang Tapon (lit. 'Ompong Rice Batter: With a Head, No Spill') is a 1988 Filipino comedy film written and directed by Angel Labra and starring Dolphy and Redford White. Produced by Horizon Films, it was released on August 31, 1988. Critic Lav Diaz gave the film a negative review, criticizing the unfunny slapstick comedy and illogical situations.

== Cast ==
- Dolphy as Rodolfo "Ompong" Olimpio
- Redford White as Robert
- Chat Silayan as Ester
- Berting Labra
- Rommel Valdez as Rolly
- Don Pepot
- Ronel Victor as Miguel
- Ria Baron as Neneng
- Max Alvarado as Blackbeard
- Bomber Moran
- Mario Escudero as Mayor
- Ruel Vernal
- Angelo Ventura
- Vic Varrion as Vice Mayor
- Mely Tagasa as Miss R. Concepcion
- Tatlong Itlog (Three Eggs)
- Balot
- Maning Bato
- Fred Panopio
- Isko
- Romy Nario
- Jing Caparas
- Linda Castro
- Pons de Guzman
- Jimmy Santos

== Critical response ==
Lav Diaz, writing for the Manila Standard, gave Ompong Galapong a negative review, criticizing the film's illogical situations such as having a longtime lawyer for a deceitful mayor leave his client and walk at night to a dark place without any bodyguard or protection, only to easily be killed by a paid assassin. Diaz was also critical of the film's unfunny slapstick comedy, though he gave an exception to a scene involving Berting Labra's character playing ball, and concluded that it is an example of a film which uses numerous popular comedians but is still really lacking.
