= Super Laff-In =

- Title card (second incarnation)
- Genre: Sketch comedy show
- Created by: ABS-CBN Studios
- Based on: Rowan & Martin's Laugh-In
- Developed by: ABS-CBN Studios
- Opening theme: "Super Laff-In"
- Country of origin: Philippines
- Original language: Filipino
- No. of episodes: 185 (original); 167 (remake)

Production
- Running time: 90 minutes

Original release
- Network: ABS-CBN
- Release: February 1, 1969 – September 16, 1972
- Release: May 31, 1996 – March 26, 1999

Related
- Banana Split; Goin' Bulilit

Super Laff-In is a Philippine television sketch comedy show broadcast by ABS-CBN. Originally directed by Bert de Leon. The series is based on American the television series Rowan & Martin's Laugh-In. It aired from February 1, 1969, to September 16, 1972. The show returned from May 31, 1996, to March 26, 1999. Johnny Manahan served as the final director.

== Cast ==
=== First incarnation ===
Air date: February 1, 1969 to September 16, 1972

- Bert de Leon (Director)
- Balot
- Frankie Evangelista
- June Keithley
- Baby O'Brian
- Mitch Valdez (formerly Maya Valdez)
- Ramon Zamora
- Rey Javier
- Bayani Casimiro
- Tintoy
- Rose Javier
- Nova Villa
- Tange
- Babalu
- Babalina
- Victoria De Jesus

=== Second incarnation ===
Air date: May 25, 1996, to March 26, 1999

- Redford White
- Glydel Mercado
- Wowie de Guzman
- Guila Alvarez
- Regine Tolentino
- Diether Ocampo
- Mylene Dizon
- Bayani Agbayani
- Norman Mitchell
- Vhong Navarro
- Trisha Salvador
- Bojo Molina
- Blue de Leon
- Rufa Mae Quinto
- Farrah Florer
- John Prats
- John Lloyd Cruz
- Daniel Pasia
- Dominic Ochoa
- Rommel Montano
- William Thio
- Lui Villaruz
- Julia Clarete
- Miggy Tanchanco
- Mark Vernal
- Diana Enriquez
- Miong (a cartoon character of Super Laff-In and logo)

== See also ==
- Banana Sundae
- Bubble Gang
- Ispup
- Tropang Trumpo
- Wow Mali
- Champoy
- List of programs broadcast by ABS-CBN
