= Iskul Bukol =

Philippine television sitcom series

- Genre: Situational comedy
- Directed by: Bert de Leon
- Starring: Tito Sotto; Vic Sotto; Joey de Leon
- Theme music composer: Joey de Leon; Vic Sotto
- Country of origin: Philippines
- Original language: Filipino

Production
- Executive producer: Emmanuel "Boy" Gatus
- Running time: 60 minutes (including commercials)
- Production company: Our Own Little Way Productions

Original release
- Network: IBC
- Release: October 3, 1978 – 1988

Iskul Bukol is a Philippine television sitcom series broadcast by IBC. Directed by Bert de Leon, it stars Tito Sotto, Vic Sotto, Joey de Leon, Mely Tagasa, Bing Angeles, Anthony Roquel, Dely Atay-Atayan, Sharon Cuneta, Bibeth Orteza, Richie Reyes, Mary Massab, Joey Albert, Kaye Torres, Redford White, Jimmy Santos, Ariel Villasanta and Rod Navarro. It aired from October 3, 1978 to 1988. The show centered around student life in the fictional Wanbol University.

== Main characters ==
- Josélito "Tito" Escalera (Tito Sotto) - one half of the Escalera brothers, who plots hare-brained schemes in every episode.
- Josémari "Joey" Escalera (Joey de Leon) - the other Escalera sibling. Miss Tapia has a crush on him.
- Victorio "Vic" Ungasis (Vic Sotto) - the good-looking and smart teacher's pet with a "chick magnet" personality. The Escaleras often pick on him during class. Later, he became a professor at Wanbol University.
- Liwayway Gawgaw Tapia, a.k.a., Miss Tapia (Mely Tagasa) - Wanbol University's professor who often gets on the Escalera brothers' nerves. Although she admires Joey Escalera, Miss Tapia was romantically connected with Mang Tem-i. Vic is her favorite student. Miss Tapia was originally a character in the GMA sitcom Baltic & Co. (1974-1976), also portrayed by Tagasa. Baltic & Co. is based on the newspaper comic strip of the same title created by Roni Santigo. Baltic & Co. and Iskul Bukol are unrelated media franchises.
- Artemis Batongbuhay, a.k.a., Mang Tem-i (Bing Angeles) - the dark-complexioned operator of the university's cafeteria. His name is a vesre on the Filipino word "itim" (black or dark), "tim-i" or "tem-i."
- Tonette Macho (Anthony Roquel) - the gay student who plays as best friend of the fairest girl in class (Mary and Joey Anson). He is also the nemesis of the Escalera Brothers.
- Aling Jacoba or Inang (Dely Atay-Atayan) - Vic's mother from the town of Tiaong, Quezon. Famous for her term of endearment "bunsooyy!" whenever addressing Vic. The root word "bunso" is Tagalog for youngest child.
- Sharon Escalera (Sharon Cuneta) - younger sister of Tito and Joey.
- Viviana "Bibeth" Belibet (Bibeth Orteza) - Vic's female roommate and fellow student.
- Richie "Kabayo" (Richie Reyes) - a fellow student who always copies homework from Vic & Bibeth. He is also an accomplice to the Escaleras' comedic pranks.
- Mary (Mary Massab) - fellow student.
- Joey Anson (Joey Albert) - fellow student.
- Kaye Flores (Kaye Torres) - fellow student.
- Redford (Redford White) - Mang Tem-i's houseboy and the cafeteria's waiter. The character was replaced by Jimmy "Big J" (Jimmy Santos) after the departure of White from the series.
- Jimmy "Big J" (Jimmy Santos) - replacement of Redford at Mang Tem-i's cafeteria.
- Perfecto "Pekto" Pangkista (Ariel Villasanta) - a fellow Wanbol student and part-time waiter at Mang Tem-i's canteen who dresses like a 1970s punk rocker.
- Don José Escalera (Rod Navarro) - father of the Escalera siblings.

== Sequels ==
=== Iskul Bukol: Book 2 (1988–1990) ===
Iskul Bukol
- Genre: Situational comedy
- Directed by: Bert de Leon
- Starring: Niño Muhlach; Keempee de Leon
- Theme music composer: Joey de Leon; Vic Sotto
- Country of origin: Philippines
- Original language: Filipino

Production
- Executive producer: Emmanuel "Boy" Gatus
- Running time: 60 minutes (including commercials)
- Production company: Our Own Little Way Productions

Original release
- Network: IBC
- Release: 1988 – 1990

Iskul Bukol: Book 2 is a Philippine television sitcom series broadcast by IBC. Directed by Bert de Leon, it stars Niño Muhlach, Keempee de Leon, Romnick Sarmenta, Mely Tagasa, Bing Angeles, Anthony Roquel, RJ Ledesma and Jimmy Santos. It aired from 1988 to 1990. The series both nephews of Tito and Joey Escalera. Mely Tagasa, Bing Angeles, Anthony Raquel and Jimmy Santos would reprise their roles from the original series.

Main characters:

- Toti Sietepares (Niño Muhlach)
- Widyo Sietepares (Keempee de Leon)
- Roming Ungasis (Romnick Sarmenta)
- Liwayway Gawgaw Tapia, a.k.a., Miss Tapia (Mely Tagasa)†
- Artemis Batongbuhay, a.k.a., Mang Tem-i (Bing Angeles)†
- Tonette Macho (Anthony Roquel)
- RJ (RJ Ledesma) - The new student at Wanbol University who comes from a rich family.
- RJ's mom (Nanette Inventor)
- Jimmy "Big J" (Jimmy Santos)

=== Back to Iskul Bukol (1999–2000) ===
Iskul Bukol
- Genre: Situational comedy
- Directed by: Soxie Topacio
- Starring: Joey de Leon
- Theme music composer: Joey de Leon; Vic Sotto
- Country of origin: Philippines
- Original language: Filipino

Production
- Executive producer: Emmanuel "Boy" Gatus
- Running time: 60 minutes (including commercials)
- Production company: Viva Television

Original release
- Network: IBC
- Release: 1999 – January 8, 2000

Back to Iskul Bukol is a Philippine television sitcom series broadcast by IBC. The series is sequel to Iskul Bukol. Directed by Soxie Topacio, it stars Joey de Leon, Mely Tagasa, Bing Angeles, Val Sotto, Marissa Sanchez, Ruby Rodriguez, Patricia Javier, Gian Sotto, Mausi Wohlfarth, Maui Taylor and Katya Santos. It aired from 1999 to January 8, 2000. De Leon's character, Joey Escalera, is now an English literature professor who decides to go back to Wanbol University to teach and wreak havoc like in the old days. Things could not get any worse when he finds out that one of his students, Ludwig von Tapia (Jeffrey Tam), is actually his and Miss Tapia's love child.

Its canonicity in the Iskul Bukol timeline is in question with the appearance of Gian Sotto and Jeffrey Tam in Iskul Bukol 20 Years After.

Main characters:

- Joey de Leon
- Mely Tagasa
- Bing Angeles
- Jeffrey Tam
- Val Sotto
- Marissa Sanchez
- Ruby Rodriguez
- Patricia Javier
- Gian Sotto (as Jigs)
- Mausi Wohlfarth (as Mumai)
- Maui Taylor
- Katya Santos

== Remake ==
Iskul Bukol
- Genre: Situational comedy
- Directed by: Soxie Topacio; Dante Nico Garcia
- Starring: Fred Lo; Sam Y.G. Alwyn Uytingco; Erika Padilla
- Theme music composer: Joey de Leon; Vic Sotto
- Country of origin: Philippines
- Original language: Filipino
- No. of episodes: 19

Production
- Running time: 60 minutes (including commercials)
- Production company: APT Entertainment

Original release
- Network: TV5
- Release: May 24 – September 27, 2011

Iskul Bukol: Eskwelang Kwela 'To! is a Philippine television sitcom series broadcast by TV5. The series is based on the 1978 Philippine television sitcom of the same title. Directed by Soxie Topacio and Dante Nico Garcia, it stars Fred Lo, Sam Y.G., Alwyn Uytingco, Erika Padilla and Regine Angeles in supporting roles. It aired from May 24 to September 27, 2011, replacing Hap-ier Together and was replaced by Flames of Desire. The remake would not feature any character from the original series, although it would still be set in Wanbol University. He added that the remake would have partial influences from Glee and How I Met Your Mother.

Main characters:

- Fred Lo
- Sam Y.G.
- Alwyn Uytingco
- Erika Padilla

== Films ==
- Iskul Bukol the Movie (1978)
- Iskul Bukol Freshmen (1980)
- The Best of Iskul Bukol: The Movie (1987)
- Iskul Bukol 20 Years After: The Ungasis and Escaleras Adventure (2008)

== Music ==
The eponymous opening theme song was composed by Joey de Leon and Vic Sotto, inspired by Elvis Presley’s “All Shook Up”. A full version of the theme song was released as single by Tito, Vic & Joey in 1979 and featured in the trio’s Sgt. Pepe (Tito, Vic & Joey, Vol. IV) album. The trio also released an album in 1980 entitled Iskul Bukol, featuring the logo of the television series on its cover.

"Iskul Bukol"

Single by Tito, Vic & Joey

from the album Sgt. Pepe (Tito, Vic & Joey, Vol. IV)
- B-side: "Upakan (Dialogo)"
- Released: 1979
- Studio: Cinema Audio
- Genre: Pop, comedy
- Label: Sunshine
- Songwriters: Joey de Leon, Vic Sotto
- Producer: Spanky Rigor

Studio album by Tito, Vic & Joey
- Released: 1980
- Recorded: 1980
- Studio: Cinema Audio
- Genre: Comedy
- Label: Canary

Iskul Bukol (1980 album)
No.	Title	Writer(s)	Featuring	Length
1.	"Iskul Bukol Medley"	Joey de Leon
2.	"Bale, Bale (“Macho Man”)"	Vincent Huang Dy Buncio, Pancho Oppus III
3.	"Body Odor (“Body Language”)"	Joey de Leon
4.	"Barado (“Love Boat”)"	Vincent Huang Dy Buncio, Pancho Oppus III
5.	"Black & White (“American Dream”)"	Joey de Leon	Mang Tem-i and Redford
6.	"Utang (“Love Hurts”)"	Joey de Leon	Richie D'Horsie
7.	"Middle East Connection (“Rainbow Connection”)"	Vincent Huang Dy Buncio, Pancho Oppus III
8.	"Reprise: Macho…. Manggagancho!!!"	Joey de Leon
9.	"Mekekekwe (“A Lover's Holiday”)"	Joey de Leon
10.	"Maskuladong Syota (“Can’t Stop The Music”)"	Joey de Leon
11.	"Lome (“Love Me”)"	Joey de Leon
12.	"Stainless Gin (“Fame”)"	Joey de Leon

== Mini-reunion in 2007 ==
A Iskul Bukol mini-reunion was celebrated on June 30, 2007 in the GMA Network show Eat Bulaga!'s Bulagaan portion. Mely Tagasa, Tito Sotto, Joey de Leon and Vic Sotto appeared, reprising their roles from Iskul Bukol.

== Influence ==
In the GMA Network documentary show I-Witness, presenter Jay Taruc revisited Iskul Bukol and the Philippines’ comedy trio (Tito, Vic, and Joey) in a 2007 retrospective episode titled "Wanbol University" and discovered that TVJ merchandise was still a hit.

== See also ==
- List of TV5 (Philippine TV network) original programming
