= Iskul Bukol 20 Years After: The Ungasis and Escaleras Adventure =

Iskul Bukol 20 Years After (Ungasis and Escaleras Adventure)
- Directed by: Tony Y. Reyes
- Screenplay by: Bibeth Orteza
- Story by: Bibeth Orteza
- Produced by: Marvic Sotto; Antonio P. Tuviera; Orly Ilacad
- Starring: Tito Sotto; Vic Sotto; Joey De Leon; Ryan Agoncillo; Oyo Sotto; Benjie Paras; Jimmy Santos; Jose Manalo; Francine Prieto; Bianca King; Pauleen Luna; Carlene Aguilar
- Cinematography: Lito 'Itok' Mempin
- Edited by: Danny Añonuevo
- Music by: Michael Alba
- Production companies: M-Zet TV Productions; APT Entertainment; OctoArts Films (Philippines)
- Distributed by: OctoArts Films (Philippines)
- Release date: December 25, 2008 (Philippines)
- Running time: 105 minutes (Philippines); 130 minutes (U.S.)
- Country: Philippines
- Languages: Filipino; English; Khmer; Japanese
- Budget: ₱59 million
- Box office: ₱107 million(Official 2008 MMFF run); ₱116 million (Official Domestic Run)

Iskul Bukol 20 Years After (Ungasis and Escaleras Adventure) is a 2008 Filipino adventure comedy film starring actors Tito Sotto, Vic Sotto, and Joey de Leon. It is part of the Iskul Bukol franchise, depicting its characters 20 years after the end of the original TV series. It is also the fourth Iskul Bukol film (after 1977's Iskul Bukol the Movie, 1980's Iskul Bukol Freshmen, and 1987's The Best of Iskul Bukol: The Movie).

The movie, which was a joint collaboration of APT Entertainment, M-ZET Productions, and OctoArts Films, was one of the movies exhibited at the 2008 Metro Manila Film Festival.

== Premise ==
Vic Ungasis (Vic Sotto) is an archaeologist who has recovered the Kali of Humabon and is looking for a partner sword, the Kampilan of Lapulapu, plus the Peseta, one of Judas Iscariot's 30 pieces of silver which reportedly gives the bearer immortality, while taking care of a Cambodian-Filipino boy (Buboy Villar) who was orphaned when his parents were killed. Upon returning home, he reunites with the Escalera brothers (Tito Sotto and Joey de Leon), who have become successful real-estate developers. The trio attends a reunion, which includes some of the original cast of Iskul Bukol, and their relatives. Meanwhile, a Yakuza (Woo) who has acquired the Kampilan wants the Peseta so it could be merged with the sword for unmatched power.

== Cast ==
- Tito Sotto as Tito Escalera
- Vic Sotto as Vic Ungasis
- Joey de Leon as Joey Escalera
- Gian Sotto as Gianni Escalera
- Oyo Boy Sotto as Yoyo Ungasis
- Keempee de Leon as Wympy Escalera
- Mely Tagasa as Liwayway Gawgaw Tapia aka Miss Tapia
- Jose Manalo as Jude
- Wally Bayola as Sting
- Carlene Aguilar as Alice John
- Bianca King as Girlie, Ungasis' secretary
- Jimmy Santos as Big J, the Escalera brothers' driver
- Benjie Paras as Genie, one of Ungasis' colleagues in the university's history department
- Robert Villar as Oohn, a Filipino-Cambodian child.
- Jacky Woo as Shimata
- Francine Prieto as Brenda, Shimata's moll
- Pauleen Luna as Patty
- Krista Ranillo as Faye
- Nicole Uysiuseng as Tessa
- Redford White as Redford
- Jhong Hilario as Fernando, Oohn's Filipino father
- Ryan Agoncillo as Samnang, Oohn's mute uncle
- Aira Bermudez as a dancer during the reunion
- EB Babes as dancers during the reunion
- Joonee Gamboa as Tatang, the caretaker of Peseta

=== Original TV series cast ===
Many members of the original 1978 TV series cast appear in the movie, aside from the three leads. They include Anthony Roquel (Tonette Macho), Mely Tagasa (Miss Tapia), Sharon Cuneta (Sharon Escalera), Redford White (Redford), Ariel Villasanta (Pekto), Bibeth Orteza (Bibeth Belibet), Kaye Torres (Kaye Flores) and Richie D'Horsie (Richie "Kabayo").

Vic Sotto said the decision to get Richie D'Horsie for the film was difficult, considering that he, Tito Sotto, and Joey de Leon have bailed him out several times in past years due to drug charges but he did not change his ways. The trio stressed that the latest bail, where they paid ₱120,000.00, will be his last chance to reform. Ritchie D'Horsie eventually appeared on set during the last shooting day on November 11, 2008.

The character of Mang Tem-i was retired as Bing Angeles had died in 2001. The movie was dedicated to him and series producer Emmanuel "Boy" Gatus, who died in October 2008. This marked Redford White's final film appearance before his death in 2010.

Certain characters were introduced as an homage to past series characters. Joey de Leon's son, Keempee de Leon, plays Wympy, Joey Escalera's son by series character Patty Pulupot, a dancer at the Agogo Banana strip club. Gian Sotto, Tito Sotto's son, plays Gianni, Tito Escalera's son by Pulupot's colleague, Mercy Taga. Bubble Gang mainstay Mykah appears in a short scene as Mang Tem-i's daughter Tem-ita.

== Development ==
Vic Sotto first revealed during a 2007 episode of the GMA documentary show I-Witness that he wished to do a reunion movie with the surviving cast members of Iskul Bukol. He later said that after four straight Enteng Kabisote movies, it was high time that the comic trio got back together on the big screen. On July 2, 2008, Vic's film production company, M-ZET Films, submitted a script written by fellow cast member Bibeth Orteza, intended for the 2008 Metro Manila Film Festival (MMFF). The entry entitled Vic Ungasis en the Escaleras was immediately approved by the MMFF jurors. The title was changed to Escalera and Ungasis: 20 Years After, which reunited the main characters for the first time since the original TV series.

The movie's title was changed again to Iskul Bukol 20 Years After: Ungasis and Escaleras Adventure in order to gain strong audience recall, owing its large fanbase to people who grew up during the TV show's original run.

Filming began in late September 2008. Vic Sotto, Ryan Agoncillo, and Jose Manalo joined the crew in shooting the foreign scenes in Cambodia from October 7 to 14. The crew wrapped up production on November 11, 2008, when the movie's reunion scene was shot at the Sta. Catalina College in Manila.

== Critical reception ==
The film gathered mixed reviews. On the positive side, Phillip Cu-Unjieng of the Philippine Star said the film appealed to young viewers because of the action-adventure element, while older fans of the show can relate to the characters that come back after a long time. On the negative side, Manila Times contributor Joey Ting said the film's comedic elements were rehashed staples of Tito, Vic, and Joey's usual skits. The review by Judith Juntilla of Business World criticized the film's concentration on action-adventure as a Iskul Bukol-oriented version of Enteng Kabisote's plots over the years, instead of focusing on what has happened to other Iskul Bukol characters in the past two decades beyond the film's reunion scene.

The film eventually earned ₱107 million in earnings for the Metro Manila Film Festival and earned its Third Best Picture award, behind Ang Tanging Ina Nyong Lahat and top awardee, Baler.

== Awards ==
Year	Award-Giving Body	Category	Recipient	Result
2008	Metro Manila Film Festival	Third Best Picture	Iskul Bukol 20 Years After	Won
