= I Love You 3x a Day =

1988 Filipino comedy film

- Directed by: Mike Relon Makiling
- Screenplay by: Jose Javier Reyes; Mike Relon Makiling
- Story by: Jose Javier Reyes
- Produced by: Ramon Salvador
- Starring: Jimmy Santos; Carmi Martin
- Cinematography: Ben Lobo
- Edited by: Renato de Leon
- Music by: Jaime Fabregas
- Production company: Viva Films
- Release date: November 9, 1988
- Country: Philippines
- Languages: Filipino; English

I Love You 3x a Day (stylized onscreen as I ♥ You 3x a Day) is a 1988 Filipino fantasy comedy film co-written and directed by Mike Relon Makiling and starring Jimmy Santos in his first lead role. It also stars Carmi Martin, Nova Villa, Ruffa Gutierrez, Gelli de Belen, Cheenee de Leon, and Keempee de Leon. Produced by Viva Films, the film was released on November 9, 1988. Critic Lav Diaz gave the film a positive review, giving special praise to Santos for his unique comedic style in comparison to other Filipino comedians.

== Plot ==
Webster Shakespeare Cubangbang deludedly thinks he has mastered the English language, and his university dean decides to give him his diploma so that he does not return to college to bother his professors. Webster uses his diploma to apply for a job as an English teacher at Mababangloob High School and end his dependence on his mother, a notorious gambler who regularly cheats while playing.

Webster is assigned to Section X, a class infamous for three friends, Tom, Archie and Max, who terrorize their teachers. They are later joined by a Japanese transfer student, Sashimi. Webster is tormented by the four, culminating in him being electrocuted in one of their pranks. The four are ordered expelled by the principal, Dacuycuy, but Webster rushes from the clinic and insists on giving them another chance on condition that he will also be expelled from school should they misbehave again. The boys ultimately apologize and change their ways after Webster is beaten up while defending them from a group of thugs at a nightclub.

Webster falls for a fellow teacher named Grace, but is stymied by her turbulent relationship with her fiancé, Raymond. Depressed, Webster tries to jump off a bridge but is rescued by Venus, a fairy godmother who helps him by granting him the ability to make people come after him whenever he says the line "I love you three times a day". Grace later breaks off her engagement with Raymond after he insists on sleeping together before their marriage, reviving Webster’s spirits. Webster tries to seduce Grace, but the words are instead heard by a colleague, Fritzi, who chases wildly after Webster until he hides under a moving bust of the school founder.

Webster organizes a spelling team composed of Archie, Max and Tom, and convinces a wary Dacuycuy to give them a chance to compete. After the team wins the elimination round of a spelling bee, Webster tries to seduce Grace with the magic line again, but Sashimi’s aunt and fellow teacher, Saucy, overhears the line instead, resulting in her forcing herself on Webster. Saucy comes into her senses after being caught by the spelling team and Dacoycoy, but Saucy, who has no memory of what happened, insists that Webster assaulted her, resulting in his dismissal.

Sashimi maneuvers to reverse Webster’s expulsion, and Webster coaches the spelling team to win the spelling bee finals. At the school's victory party, Webster finally says the magic line to Grace in public, but is overheard and mobbed by the entire school instead.

== Cast ==
- Jimmy Santos as Webster Shakespeare Cubangbang
- Carmi Martin as Grace Samson
- Nova Villa as Saucy Matukoy
- Ruffa Gutierrez as Agnes Reyes
- Jigo Garcia as Max
- Geli de Belen as Doro/Dora
- Kimpee de Leon as Tomas "Tom" Cruz
- Cheenee de Leon as Gerry Cruz
- Dingdong Avanzado as Archie
- Rene Requiestas as a janitor
- Fe delos Reyes as Fritzi
- Ronald Jayme as George
- Chinkee as Sashimi Matukoy
- Gary Boy Garcia as Dennis
- Joey de Leon as Venus the fairy godmother
- Dexter Doria as Stella
- Moody Diaz as Webster's mother
- Lucio Mailas as Charles Dacuycoy
- Bert Manzueto as Mr. Arrogante
- Manolette Ripol as Butch
- Paeng Giant as Don Leon Mababangloob
- Emeng Barcelon as Webster's neighbor
- Phillip Salvador as Afuang
- Vic Sotto as a security guard
- Jimmy Fabregas as Dean Jaime Cabunglaw
- Julio Diaz as Raymond
- Val Sotto as Agila
- Spanky Rigor as spelling bee emcee
- Mely Tagasa as spelling bee umpire
- Yoyong Martirez as spelling bee coach
- Zorayda Sanchez as Grace's maid
- Beverly Salviejo as a poolside beauty
- Ilonah Jean as a volleyball player

== Production ==
=== Background ===
Comedian and former basketball player Jimmy Santos began using the catchphrase "I love you three times a day" in the sitcom Dina. By the late 1980s, the catchphrase became his signature line on television.

== Release ==
I Love You 3x a Day was released on November 9, 1988. Joey de Leon's daughter Cheenee de Leon and Dingdong Avanzado sang a duet together on Regal Family to promote the film.

=== Television broadcast ===
The film received a terrestrial television premiere on November 24, 1990, as part of ABS-CBN's feature presentation for Tagalog Movie Greats.

== Critical response ==
Lav Diaz, writing for the Manila Standard, gave a positive review to I Love You 3x a Day, praising Jimmy Santos' unique style of comedy which involves a distinctive rambling use of the English language; he noted that in comparison to other Filipino comedians who also distort the English language, Santos' jokes and delivery are new. Diaz also praised the decision to pair Santos with Carmi Martin, whom he called "one of the very sturdy promoters of the stupid revolution", and credited the success of the film's comedy to Rene Requiestas, Jimmy Fabregas, Nova Villa, and Paeng Giant in addition to Santos' performance. However, he criticized the group of Jigo Garcia, Kimpee de Leon and Dingdong Avanzado for being "soaked in corniness".
