= T.O.D.A.S.: Television's Outrageously Delightful All-Star Show =

Philippine sketch comedy show (1980–1989)

- Also known as: T.O.D.A.S.: Television's Outrageously Delightful Afternoon Show (1980-1981)
- Genre: Sketch comedy, Variety show
- Directed by: Bert de Leon
- Starring: Marlene Feliciano; Maribeth Bichara; Frieda Fonda; Spanky Rigor; Richie D'Horsie; Jimmy Santos; Val Sotto; Joey de Leon; Redford White
- Opening theme: "Cry Baby" by Quincy Jones
- Country of origin: Philippines
- Original language: Filipino

Production
- Executive producers: Flora Tecson; Gem Cabrera; Cora Abelardo
- Running time: 60 minutes
- Production company: IBC Entertainment Group

Original release
- Network: IBC
- Release: 1980 – 1989

Related
- T.O.D.A.S. Again

T.O.D.A.S.: Television's Outrageously Delightful All-Star Show, originally known as T.O.D.A.S.: Television's Outrageously Delightful Afternoon Show from 1980 until 1981, more popularly known as simply T.O.D.A.S., is a Philippine television sketch comedy show broadcast by IBC. Directed by Bert de Leon, it stars Marlene Feliciano, Maribeth Bichara, Frieda Fonda, Spanky Rigor, Richie D'Horsie, Jimmy Santos, Val Sotto, Joey de Leon and Redford White. It aired from 1980 to 1989. It was the Philippines' most popular comedy show throughout its run.

== Cast ==
- Marlene Feliciano (1980–1985)
- Maribeth Bichara (1980–1989)
- Frieda Fonda (1980–1989)
- Spanky Rigor (1980–1989)
- Richie D'Horsie (1980–1986)
- Jimmy Santos (1987–1989)
- Val Sotto (1980–1989)
- Joey de Leon (1980–1988)
- Redford White (1980–1984)
- Yayo Aguila (1985–1986)

== Revival ==
A revival and spiritual successor of the show, T.O.D.A.S. Again, aired on IBC in 1993.

== Re-runs ==
Reruns of the series was aired on IBC from February 11 to July 19, 2019.

Some episodes of the series were shown on IBC's archival program Retro TV (hosted by Drew Arellano), aired from November 17, 2003 to February 20, 2004, with reruns airing from 2004 until 2005, 2014 and 2019.
