= Black Magic (1987 film) =

1987 fantasy comedy film starring Dolphy

- Official movie poster
- Directed by: Mike Relon Makiling
- Written by: Jake Cocadiz
- Starring: Dolphy; Zsa Zsa Padilla; Jestoni Alarcon; Michael Locsin; Ian Veneracion; Jovit Moya; Jaime Castillo; Jennifer Sevilla
- Cinematography: Ding Austria
- Edited by: Renato de Leon
- Music by: Boy Alcaide
- Production company: Seiko Films
- Distributed by: Seiko Films
- Release date: November 26, 1987
- Running time: 122 minutes
- Country: Philippines
- Language: Filipino

Black Magic is a 1987 Filipino fantasy comedy film directed by Mike Relon Makiling. The film stars Dolphy, Zsa Zsa Padilla, Jestoni Alarcon, Rita Avila, Ian Veneracion, Michael Locsin, Rose Ann Gonzales Jovit Moya, Jennifer Sevilla, and Jaime Castillo. Produced by Seiko Films, it was released on November 26, 1987.

Critic Luciano E. Soriano of the Manila Standard gave the film a mixed review, praising Dolphy's natural comedic skills while criticizing the number of characters as excessive and unnecessary for the story.

== Plot ==
Wanting to win the heart of a beautiful teacher, Demi makes a pact with the devil to use black magic powers for his own advantage. But with his pure heart prevailing over evil intentions, Demi uses the powers to save people badly in need of his help instead. Furious, the devil asks for Demi's soul in exchange for using his magic.

== Cast ==
- Dolphy as Demi, a janitor
- Zsa Zsa Padilla as Valerie, a teacher
- Jestoni Alarcon as Victor Bulaklak
- Rita Avila as Emma
- Ian Veneracion
- Michael Locsin as Albert
- Rose Ann Gonzales
- Jovit Moya
- Jennifer Sevilla
- Jaime Castillo
- Romy Diaz as Satanas
- Jimmy Santos as Brian
- Johnny Wilson
- Don Pepot
- Ros Olgado
- Lucita Soriano as a prostitute
- Joaquin Fajardo
- Conde Ubaldo
- Fred Moro
- Balot
- Mely Tagasa
- Larry Silva
- Rusty Santos
- Vangie Labalan
- Flora Gasser
- Pong Pong
- Rod Francisco
- Jay Grama
- Julie del Mar
- Nesty Ramirez
- Arthur Lioron
- Emeng Barcelona
- Jay-R Balanche

== Release ==
Black Magic was released on November 26, 1987.

=== Box office ===
On its opening day, the film grossed ₱1.8 million, behind Kapag Puno Na ang Salop starring Fernando Poe Jr. and ahead of Walang Karugtong ang Nakaraan starring Sharon Cuneta. However, Black Magic would later become the highest-grossing film among the three releases.

=== Critical response ===
Luciano E. Soriano of the Manila Standard gave Black Magic a mixed review. He praised Dolphy's dependable comedic skills, stating that he plays his character "with the ease of one who has been there for a long time", while criticizing the film's excessive number of characters, as its lead to a script that "meanders here and there to justify the presence of too many characters in the story." He also noted the film's strange inclusion of sexual innuendos in what is supposed to be a film meant for young viewers.
