= Richie D'Horsie =

Filipino actor and comedian (1956–2015)

Richie D' Horsie
- Born: Richard Vista Reyes; September 13, 1956; Manila, Philippines
- Died: April 17, 2015 (aged 58); Manila, Philippines
- Resting place: Loyola Memorial Park, Marikina
- Other name: Richie D' Horsie
- Occupations: Actor; comedian
- Years active: 1979–2015
- Spouse: Joy Reyes

Richard Reyes (September 13, 1956 – April 17, 2015), professionally known as Richie D' Horsie (Tagalog pronunciation: [diˈhorsi]), was a Filipino actor and comedian.

== Early life ==
Reyes was born in Manila, Philippines on September 13, 1956.

== Career ==
Reyes rose to fame as a sidekick to the comedy trio Tito, Vic and Joey. He made his television debut on Discorama. The comedian also became part of Iskul Bukol in 1978 and joined Eat Bulaga! in 1979. He was also in T.O.D.A.S.: Television's Outrageously Delightful All-Star Show from 1981 to 1986.

== Pepsi Paloma gang rape case ==
Pepsi Paloma, who was 15 at the time, accused Reyes and fellow comedians Vic Sotto and Joey de Leon of gang raping and taking photos of her on June 21, 1982, in a room at the Sulo Hotel in Quezon City. On July 31, Paloma's manager Rey dela Cruz lodged a formal complaint with Defense Minister Juan Ponce Enrile. On August 18, 1982, Paloma filed charges of rape and acts of lasciviousness against the three television personalities before the Quezon City fiscal's office. The crime of rape at the time, carried the death penalty in the Philippines, and to prevent his brother and his cohorts from being sent to the electric chair, Tito Sotto quickly went to see Paloma while she was still securing the services of Atty. Rene Cayetano. According to Paloma, Tito Sotto coerced her into signing an "Affidavit of Desistance" to drop the rape charges against his brother and cohorts—Tito Sotto had allegedly placed a pistol on the table in front of Paloma when he went to talk to her.

In exchange for the dismissal of the charges of rape, Vic Sotto, de Leon and he issued a public apology to Paloma stating:

"We hope that you will not allow the error we have committed against you to stand as a stumbling block to that future which we all look forward to. We therefore ask you to find it in your heart to pardon us for the wrong which we have done against you."

Three years later, Paloma was found dead in an apparent suicide. Dela Cruz was murdered years later.

== Personal life and death ==
In September 2000, he was arrested in Muntinlupa City after local police authorities caught him handing over methamphetamine (locally known as "shabu") to a 20-year-old.

He died on April 17, 2015, at the age of 58 due to complications brought about by diabetes, kidney failure and brain stroke, reports said. His wake was at Loyola Memorial Park, Marikina City.

== Filmography ==
=== Film ===
Year	Title	Role
1979	Swing It Baby	Man in the Meeting Room
1979	Rock Baby Rock	
1980	Iskul Bukol the Movie	Richie
1981	Palpak Connection	
1981	Iskul Bukol 2	Richie
1981	Tartan	
1982	Si Ako at Tres Musikeros	Orsi
1982	Tatlo Silang Tatay Ko	
1984	Goodah	
1984	Give Me Five!	
1984	Okey Olrayt!	
1985	I Won, I Won! Ang Swerte Nga Naman!	
1985	Mama Said, Papa Said, I Love You!	Bogart
1985	Doctor, Doctor, We Are Sick	
1986	Payaso	
1990	Little Boy Blue: Tiny Terrestrial	Kuya Freddie
1990	Crocodile Jones: The Son of Indiana Dundee	Briges
1990	Kabayo Kids	Don Horacio Caballero
1990	Samson en Goliath	
1991	Okay Ka, Fairy Ko!: The Movie	Drug dealer
1992	Tough Guys: Mga Batang Walong Gatang	
1992	The Return of Long Ranger & Tonton: How the West Was Wrong	Horsie
1992	Boy Anghel: Utak Polboron	
1992	Ano Ba Yan?	Agang Bungal
1992	Okay Ka, Fairy Ko, Part 2	
1993	Ano Ba Yan? 2	Agang Bungal
1993	Ang Kuya Kong Siga	Simpson
1993	Pandoy: Ang Alalay ng Panday	Kadyo
1994	Tunay na Magkaibigan, Walang Iwanan, Peksman!	Aga
1994	Hindi Pa Tapos ang Labada, Darling!	
1994	Once Upon a Time in Manila	Tom Crus
1995	Isang Kahig, Tatlong Tuka: Daddy Ka Na, Mommy Ka Pa!	
1996	Enteng en da Shaolin Kid	
2008	Iskul Bukol 20 Years After (Ungasis and Escaleras Adventure)	Richie
2009	Tulak	
2009	Love on Line (LOL)	Oxo/XO
2009	Ang Darling Kong Aswang	Tom
2011	Pak! Pak! My Dr. Kwak!	Hospital patient
2014	Alibughang Anak	

=== Television ===
Year	Title	Role
1978–1988	Iskul Bukol	Richie
1979–1985	Eat Bulaga!	Co-host
1980–1986	T.O.D.A.S.: Television's Outrageously Delightful All-Star Show	Himself
1990–1995	Okay Ka, Fairy Ko!	Richie
2007–2009	Ful Haus	Coco
2010–2011	My Darling Aswang	Tom

== See also ==
- Pepsi Paloma
- Spoliarium (Eraserheads song)
- The Rapists of Pepsi Paloma (film)
