= Balot (comedian) =

Filipino comedian, film, television, stage actor and comedian

- Born: Jaime Llave; March 22, 1926; Manila, Philippine Islands
- Died: November 27, 1996 (aged 70)
- Other name: Balut
- Occupations: Actor, comedian
- Years active: 1940s–1996
- Spouse: Matimtiman Cruz

Jaime Llave (March 22, 1926 – November 27, 1996) better known by his screen name Balot, was a Filipino comedian, film, television and stage actor in the Philippines.

== Career ==
Balot started his career as a Bodabil stage actor at the Manila Grand Opera House. He shifted to movies first appearing in a love story-drama movie titled Aklat ng Pag-ibig. His popularity increased after he started doing comedic roles. He was cast as one of the regulars on the original Super Laff-In TV show on ABS-CBN station in 1969. The popular sketch comedy show abruptly ended after Martial law was imposed in 1972, stopping almost all TV broadcasts in the country. After the show ended, the stocky actor continued appearing on movies or as guest on several TV shows usually appearing in supporting roles as the father figure, househelp, the neighbor, or an avid cockfighter with a kerchief wrapped around his signature crew cut.

== Personal life ==
Balot was married to comedian Matimtiman Cruz. He died in 1996 due to complications from diabetes; he was 70 years old.

== Filmography ==
=== Film ===
Year	Title	Role	Note(s)	Ref(s).
1971	Yari Naaaa! ...			Ref(s).
1971	Bukid Ay Basa			
1971	Ang Magtinda'y Di Biro			
1972	The Pig Boss			
1972	Love Pinoy Style			
1973	Isprakenhayt			
1973	Impossible Dream			
1974	Oh Margie Oh			
1978	Butsoy			
1979	Dobol Dribol			
1979	Awat Na, Asiong Aksaya!			
1981	Totoo Ba ang Tsimis?			
1981	Tartan			
1981	Stariray			
1981	Pabling			
1981	Ibalik ang Swerti			
1982	Summer Holiday			
1982	Si Ako at ang Tres Moskiteros			
1982	Palengke Queen			
1982	Cross My Heart			
1984	Bagets 2			
1985	I Won, I Won: Ang S'werte Nga Naman			
1985	Nagalit ang Patay sa Haba ng Lamay			
1985	Mga Paru-Parong Buking			
1985	Mama Said, Papa Said, I Love You			
1985	John & Marsha '85			
1985	Inday Bote			
1985	Menudo at Pandesal			
1986	Isang Platitong Mani			
1986	Balimbing			
1987	Family Tree			
1987	Di Bale Na Lang			
1987	Ready!.. Aim!.. Fire!..			
1987	Black Magic			
1988	Parrot Unit			
1988	Bobo Cop			
1988	Penoy Balut			
1988	One Day, Isang Araw			
1988	Ompong Galapong: May Ulo, Walang Tapon			
1988	Kumander Bawang: Kalaban ng Mga Aswang			
1990	Tora Tora, Bang Bang Bang			
1990	Hotdog			
1991	Juan Tamad at Mister Shooli: Mongolian Barbecue			

=== Television ===
Year	Title	Role
1986	Ang Manok ni San Pedro	Ikong Escuderro
