= Mely Tagasa =

Filipino actress, screenwriter and dubbing producer

- Born: Abimaela Palomo Tagasa; April 16, 1935; La Paz, Tarlac, Philippine Islands
- Died: March 24, 2018 (aged 82); Quezon City, Philippines
- Occupations: Actress; comedian
- Years active: 1977–2018
- Children: 4, including Gina

Abimaela Palomo Tagasa (April 16, 1935 – March 24, 2018), better known as Mely Tagasa, was a Filipino actress, screenwriter and dubbing producer. She was widely known for playing Miss Tapia in the sitcoms Baltic & Co. (GMA) and Iskul Bukol (IBC).

== Early life and career ==
Tagasa was raised in La Paz, Tarlac, and Nueva Ecija, Philippines. At age 9, her family moved to Manila following the end of World War II.

She was already enamored with radio. Once, she joined some friends and auditioned in a singing contest, which she won. At 17, Tagasa was playing roles on radio and set aside her college studies.

== Personal life ==
Tagasa had three daughters and one son. Her eldest daughter Gina Marissa Tagasa is a writer for movies and television in the Philippines.

== Filmography ==
=== Television ===
Year	Title	Role	Notes
1974–1976	Baltic & Co.	Liwayway Gawgaw Tapia / Miss Tapia	
1978–1988	Iskul Bukol	Liwayway Gawgaw Tapia / Miss Tapia	
1987–1989	Agila	Lola Belen	
1989–1992	Agila	Lola Belen	
1991–1996	Maalaala Mo Kaya	Various	10 episodes
1993	Noli Me Tangere	Hermana Sepa	
1995–1997	Wansapanataym	Various	3 episodes
1997	Esperanza	Principal	
1997	Calvento Files		Episode: "Savage Murder of Maria Teresa Solante"
	!Oka Tokat		Guest cast
2002–2003	Ang Iibigin ay Ikaw	Miling	
2003	Ang Iibigin ay Ikaw Pa Rin	Miling	
2005–2006	Daisy Siete: Ang Pitong Maria	Tiya Magda	
2008	Ako si Kim Samsoon	Judge	

=== Film ===
Year	Title	Role	Note(s)
1977	Dabiana		
1977	Sa Piling ng Mga Sugapa		
1978	Sabi Barok, Lab Ko Dabiana		
1978	Isinilang Ko'y Hindi Ko Tunay Na Anak		
1979	Vontes V		
1979	Mahal... Ginagabi Ka Na Naman		
1979	Bokyo		
1986	Super Islaw and the Flying Kids	Lola Cuna	
1986	Payaso		
1987	No Retreat... No Surrender... Si Kumander	Honorata	
1987	Black Magic		
1988	Rosa Mistica		Segment "Mga Dilaw Na Rosas ni Rosario"
1988	Wake Up Little Susie	Roda	
1988	Ompong Galapong: May Ulo, Walang Tapon	Miss R. Concepcion	
1988	I Love You 3x a Day	Spelling bee umpire	
1989	Everlasting Love		
1990	Elvis and James 2	Cher	
1990	Paikot-ikot		
1990	Hindi Ka Na Sisikatan ng Araw: Kapag Puno Na ang Salop Part-III		
1990	Hulihin si Nardong Toothpick		
1991	Barbi for President		
1991	Tukso, Layuan Mo Ako!		
1992	Boy Recto	Ms. Ampalaya	
1992	Shake, Rattle & Roll IV	Mrs. Baltazar	Segment "Kapitbahay"
1994	Once Upon a Time in Manila	Salome Yu	
1994	Suwapings		
1994	Walang Matigas Na Tinapay sa Mainit Na Kape		
1994	Abrakadabra	Miss Checheburetse	
1994	Lab Kita, Bilib Ka Ba?	Yaya	
1995	Run Barbi Run	Decia	
1995	Indecent Professor	Atty. Honorata Morata	
1995	Best Friends		
1995	Ang Titser Kong Pogi	School principal	
1996	Where 'D' Girls 'R'	Auntie Pacita	
1997	Biyudo si Daddy, Biyuda si Mommy (She Loves Me... He Loves Me Too...)		
1997	Honey, Nasa Langit Na Ba Ako?	Noel's lola	
1998	Sabong		
1998	Tong Tatlong Tatay Kong Pakitong Kitong		
1998	Hiling	Pura	
2000	Ayos Na... ang Kasunod		
2002	Hula Mo, Huli Ko	Lola Apols	
2008	Iskul Bukol 20 Years After: The Ungasis and Escaleras Adventure	Liwayway Gawgaw Tapia / Miss Tapia	

== Death ==
Under a month shy of her 83rd birthday, Tagasa died of stroke on 24 March 2018, aged 82, after being in a coma for two weeks.
