= Once Upon a Time in Manila =

- Directed by: Tony Y. Reyes
- Written by: Marvic Sotto; Tony Y. Reyes
- Produced by: Marvic Sotto; Jose Yu
- Starring: Vic Sotto; Cynthia Luster
- Cinematography: Joe Tutanes
- Edited by: Eduardo "Boy" Jarlego
- Music by: Mon del Rosario
- Production companies: M-Zet Productions; Harvest International Films
- Distributed by: Harvest International Films
- Release date: January 11, 1994
- Running time: 115 minutes
- Country: Philippines
- Languages: English; Filipino; Cebuano
- Budget: ₱70 million

Once Upon a Time in Manila is a 1994 Philippine action comedy film co-written and directed by Tony Y. Reyes. The film stars Vic Sotto, who co-wrote the story, and Cynthia Luster.

== Plot ==
Vic Sotto plays a barangay tanod who always seems to have a knack for saving the local folks from dangerous situations, just in the nick of time. Cynthia Luster is Lt. Cynthia Wang, a Royal Hong Kong Police on the lookout for Nikita, the infamous gang leader. Amparo Lagman (Gloria Sevilla), working as a domestic helper, becomes the unwitting target of Nikita's gang when she comes into possession of some important documents. Nikita follows her to the Philippines, along with Lt. Cynthia Wang who is in pursuit of Nikita.

A game of cat-and-mouse ensues as everyone gets swept up in a tale of international espionage with a dash of love and romance thrown into the crazy mix.

== Cast ==
- Vic Sotto as Jet Lagman
- Cynthia Luster as Lt. Cynthia Wang
- Gloria Sevilla as Amparo Lagman
- Tiya Pusit as Panchang
- Ruby Rodriguez as Carnap Victim
- Babalu as Carnapper
- Rio Diaz as Supermarket Cashier
- Yoyong Martirez as Dong
- Val Sotto as Sgt. Beltran
- Larry Silva as Chairman Shepherd
- Ritchie Reyes as Tom Crus
- Yoyoy Villame as 'Bai
- Mely Tagasa as Salome Yu
- Romy Diaz as Mario
- Charlie Davao as Luigi
