= Redford White =

Filipino actor and comedian (1955–2010)

- White in Neber 2 Geder
- Born: Cipriano Cermeño, II; December 5, 1955; Medellin, Cebu, Philippines
- Died: July 25, 2010 (aged 54); Caloocan, Philippines
- Resting place: Our Lady of Eternal Peace Memorial Park, San Jose del Monte, Bulacan
- Occupations: Actor, comedian
- Years active: 1977–2008
- Spouse: Elena de Cermeño
- Children: 1

Cipriano Cermeño II (December 5, 1955 – July 25, 2010), known professionally as Redford White, was a Filipino actor and comedian. He was best known for his role as Sol in the television sitcom Buddy and Sol opposite Eric Quizon who played Buddy. White was recognized as Best Comedy Actor on the 5th PMPC Star Awards for Television for his role as Sol.

== Early life and career ==
White first came to prominence in the late 1970s for his supporting role in the sitcom Iskul Bukol. He had a string of hits as the leading man in several 1980s comedies such as Boni and Klayd, Darakula and Hee Man: Master of None, his first major role. For several years, he starred in the TV sitcom Buddy en Sol with Eric Quizon.

In the latter part of his career, White appeared in several films for Star Cinema such as Tar-San, Ala eh... Con Bisoy! Hale-hale-hoy!: Laging panalo ang Mga Unggoy, and Haba-baba-doo! Puti-puti-poo! paired with various comedians including Babalu, Bonel Balingit, Carding Castro and Leo Martinez. His last film and television appearances were in Iskul Bukol 20 Years After and Palos on respectively, in 2008.

== Personal life ==
The first name of his screen name is based on the name of American actor Robert Redford.

He was married to Elena de Cermeño and they had a daughter, Jeruie. His closest friends were his fellow Buddy En Sol co-star Eric Quizon, Vic Sotto who worked with him in the sitcom Daddy Di Do Du, singer-songwriter Jim Paredes and comedians Gabe Mercado and Leo Martinez.

== Illness and death ==
White died at the age of 54 from lung cancer and a brain tumor on July 25, 2010, at 06:47 PST (GMT+8). He had reportedly experienced dizziness and difficulty walking, and loss of balance as early as July 2008, which the actor initially mistook for symptoms of vertigo. His physician advised magnetic resonance imaging, which White refused. He was later diagnosed with stage 4 brain cancer in February 2010.

His wake took place at Santo Niño de Maligaya Shrine in Maligaya Park Subdivision, Novaliches, Quezon City, Metro Manila.

== Filmography ==
=== Film ===
- Iskul Bukol (Freshmen) (1980)
- A Man Called 'Tolongges' (1981) as Arizona Gid
- Boni & Klayd (1981) as Boni
- Sinisinta Kita, Di Ka Kumikibo (1981)
- Tartan (1981)
- Darakula (1982) as Darakula
- Johnny Tanggo (1982)
- Johnny Tanggo Rides Again... Tatanga-tanga, Dakila Naman (1983) as Johnny Tanggo
- Rambo Tan-go (1984) as Johnny Rambo Tango
- Wrong Rangers (1984)
- Billy the Kid and the Sunshine Gid (1984)
- Sekreta "Ini" (1984)
- Okey sa Olrayt (1984)
- S.W.A.K.: Samahang Walang Atrasan sa Kalaban (1985)
- I Won, I Won (Ang Swerte Nga Naman) (1985) - Gunding
- Hee-Man: Master of None (1985) - Hee-Man
- Soldyer! (1986)
- Tu-Yay and His Magic Payong (1986) - Emilio/Tuyay
- Pipo's Power (1986) - Pipo
- Ninja Komisyon (1986) - Jacky
- No Return No Exchange (1986)
- Cobrador (1986)
- Payaso (1986)
- Rocky Tan-go IV (1986) as Rocky
- Lost and Found Command: Rebels Without Because (1987) - Cpl. Akomplis
- Balandra Crossing (1987)
- Rangers in the Wrong War (1987)
- Pulis Iskwad (1987)
- The Untouchable Family (1988) - Machine Gun Nonong
- Parrot Unit (1988) as Cpl. Akomplis
- 7 Pasiklab sa Army (1988)
- Ompong Galapong: May Ulo, Walang Tapon (1988) - Robert
- Kumander Anting-Anting (1988)
- Code Name: Black & White (1988) - Whitey
- Captain Yagit (1989) as Dodoy/Captain Yagit
- Return of Johnny Tanggo (1990)
- Buddy en Sol (Sine Ito) (1992) - Sol
- Si Lucio at si Miguel: Hihintayin Kayo sa Langit (1992) - Lucio
- Mukhang Bungo: Da Coconut Nut (1992) - Boboy Mortega
- Teacher...Teacher I Love You (also known as Titser... Titser... I Love You, 1993)
- Buddy en Sol: Praybeyt Depektibs (1993) - Sol
- Neber 2-Geder (1996)
- Pablik Enemi 1 N 2 (Aksidental Heroes) (1997) - Luis
- Wanted Perfect Murder (1997) - Elvis
- I Do? I Die! (D'yos Ko Day!) (1997) - Mokong
- Haba-Baba-Doo! Puti-Puti-Poo! (1998) - Mokong / Rita Roces
- 'Tong Tatlong Tatay Kong Pakitong Kitong (1998) - Alvin
- Ala Eh con Bisoy, Hale Hale Hoy! (Laging Panalo ang Mga Unggoy) (1998) - Clinton
- Tik Tak Toys: My Kolokotoys (1999) - Presley
- Isprikitik: Walastik Kung Pumitik (1999) - Brando
- Tar-San (1999) - Tar
- Bestman ...4 Better Not 4 Worse (2002) - Carlos Miguel
- Ispiritista: Itay, May Moomoo (2005) - Mang Teroy
- Iskul Bukol 20 Years After: The Ungasis and Escaleras Adventure (2008) - Redford

=== Television ===
- Iskul Bukol (1978–1981) as Redford (1978-1980)
- Champoy (1980–1985) as guest
- T.O.D.A.S.: Television's Outrageously Delightful All-Star Show (1980–1984) as himself (1980)
- Bisoy (1980–1981)
- 2+2 (1982–1986)
- Lovingly Yours (1984–1996) as guest
- UFO: Urbano, Feliciano & Others (1985–1986) as guest
- Family 3 Plus 1 (1986–1988) as guest
- Palibhasa Lalake (1987–1998) as guest
- Ang Tabi Kong Mamaw (1988–1989) as guest
- Buddy en Sol (RPN, 1990–1995) as Sol
- Haybol Rambol (1994–1995)
- Mikee (1994)
- Mikee Forever (1995) as guest
- Bubble Gang (1995–2009) as guest
- Maalaala Mo Kaya (1995–2005) as guest
- Home Along Da Riles (1995) as guest
- Super Laff-In (1996–1999) as himself
- Mikee Forever (1999)
- Oki Doki Doc (1999) as Bernie
- Pwedeng Pwede (1999–2001) as Bruce
- Daddy Di Do Du (2001–2007) as Bruce
- Magpakailanman (2002–2003)
- Home Along Da Airport (2003–2005) as Gabriel
- Quizon Avenue (2005)
- O Ha! (2006)
- Kokey (2007) as Nanding Kalugdan
- Palos (2008) as Mario (his last TV show)
- Tunay na Buhay (2013) posthumously featured
- Sabado Badoo (2015) posthumously featured

== Awards ==
- Winner, Best Comedy Actor for Buddy En Sol - 5th PMPC Star Awards for Television
- Nominated, Best Comedy Actor for Kokey - 22nd PMPC Star Awards for Television
