= Jimmy Santos (actor) =

Filipino actor, comedian, TV host and former professional basketball player (born 1951)

- Born: Jaime Santos; October 8, 1951 (age 74); Pateros, Rizal, Philippines
- Occupations: Actor; comedian; television host
- Years active: 1977–present
- Agent: APT Entertainment
- Basketball career

Personal information
- Listed height: 6 ft 2 in (1.88 m)

Career information
- College: JRC
- PBA draft: 1975
- Playing career: 1975–1976
- Position: Small forward / shooting guard

Career history
- 1975–1976: 7-Up Uncolas

Career highlights
- NCAA champion (1972)

YouTube information
- Channel: Jimmy Saints
- Years active: 2021–present
- Genre: Vlog
- Subscribers: 786,000
- Views: 30.3 million
- Last updated: August 4, 2026

Jaime Santos (born October 8, 1951), professionally known as Jimmy Santos, is a Filipino actor, comedian, television host, former professional basketball player and vlogger. He is one of the hosts from Eat Bulaga! from 1983 until 2022.

== Basketball career ==
Prior to his acting career, Santos became one of the "starting five" players of Jose Rizal College Heavy Bombers in which they had won a 1972 NCAA Championship together with Philip Cezar and David Cezar. He would later play for the U/tex Weavers in the commercial league MICAA, the PBA's forerunner. Santos also played thirteen games in the PBA's inaugural season (1975) for the 7-Up Uncolas. In the featured Old-timers game during the 1991 PBA All-Star week, Santos was named MVP for his late-game heroics and hijinks on the court, leading his White team over the Blue team.

== Entertainment career ==
After a one-season stint with the 7-Up Uncolas in the PBA, Santos began appearing in serious movie supporting roles in the 1970s. His debut movie was Bontoc with Fernando Poe Jr. He was also cast in Little Christmas Tree. In the 1980s he turned to comedy, and became a regular in the television series Iskul Bukol and T.O.D.A.S.: Television's Outrageously Delightful All-Star Show. He also became a regular host in the noon-time television variety show Eat Bulaga! until 2022. Since then, he starred as lead comic actor in such feature films as I Love You 3X a Day, Bondying (a remake), Wooly Booly, and Humanap Ka ng Panget.

In 2011, Santos played a supporting role alongside Vice Ganda in The Unkabogable Praybeyt Benjamin.

In 2013, he returned to action via Bang Bang Alley with Megan Young.

In 2014, Santos returned to comedy via the film My Illegal Wife with Zanjoe Marudo and Pokwang.

Santos's most recent film is TOL in 2019 with Enchong Dee and Jessy Mendiola.

== Personal life ==
He has three children. He finished banking and finance at Jose Rizal College.

In 2021, Santos started a YouTube channel under the name "Jimmy Saints" where he covers vignettes about his life.

He migrated to Canada in 2023 and worked in the recycling industry. He returned to the Philippines in 2025.

== Filmography ==
=== Film ===
Year	Title	Role	Note(s)	Ref(s).
1977	Bontoc			
1977	Little Christmas Tree			
1977	Elektika Kasi, Eh!	The Mummy		
1981	Kamakalawa	Tuktok		
1982	Suicide Force			
1984	Idol			
1984	Nang Maghalo ang Balat sa Tinalupan			
1985	Like Father, Like Son			
1985	The Crazy Professor	Weng-Weng		
1986	Matalim Na Pangil sa Gubat			
1987	Black Magic	Brian		
1987	Leroy Leroy Sinta	Jimmy		
1988	Super Inday and the Golden Bibe	Brutus		
1988	I Love You 3x a Day	Webster Shakespeare Cubangbang	First lead role	
1989	Mars Ravelo's Bondying: The Little Big Boy	Bondying		
1989	Magic to Love			
1989	M & M: The Incredible Twins	Marcelo/Don Martin		
1989	Aso't Pusa			
1989	Wooly Booly: Ang Classmate Kong Alien	Wooly Booly		
1990	Rocky n' Rolly	Rocky		
1990	Ang Titser Kong Alien: Wooly Booly II	Wooly Booly		
1991	Humanap Ka ng Panget	Big Boy		
1991	Pitong Gamol	Sargeant Dimabili		
1992	Sam & Miguel (Your Basura, No Problema)	Procopio		
1994	O-Ha! Ako Pa?	Ryan		
1994	Abrakadabra	Genie		
1994	Walang Matigas Na Pulis sa Matinik Na Misis	Billy Rosales		
1995	Onyok Tigasin			
1996	Oki Doki Doc: The Movie	Godo		
1997	Yes Darling: Walang Matigas Na Pulis... 2	Billy Rosales		
1998	Shaolin Kid at ang Mga Parak			
1998	My Guardian Debil	Dimawari		
1999	Bayadra Brothers			
2000	Ayos Na... ang Kasunod	Bindoy Dimaguiba		
2006	Enteng Kabisote 3: Okay Ka, Fairy Ko: The Legend Goes On and On and On	Boy ng Mga Batang Digmaan		
2006	Oh, My Ghost!			
2006	Binibining K			
2007	Ang M.O.N.A.Y. ni Mr. Shooli (Misteyks Opda Neysion Adres Yata)			
2008	Urduja			
2008	Iskul Bukol 20 Years After: The Ungasis and Escaleras Adventure	Big J		
2011	The Unkabogable Praybeyt Benjamin	Benjamin "Ben" Santos VII		
2011	Enteng ng Ina Mo			
2012	D' Kilabots: Pogi Brothers (Weh?!?)	Jai-ho		
2012	Si Agimat, si Enteng Kabisote at si Ako	Jimboy		
2012	My Little Bossings	Barangay Captain		
2014	Bang Bang Alley			
2014	My Illegal Wife	Zossimo Acuesta		
2015	My Love from the Star			
2015	My Bebe Love: #KiligPaMore	guests at the event in One Esplanade		
2017	Meant to Beh			
2019	TOL			
2024	A Journey	Mr. T		

=== Television ===
- Iskul Bukol (1977)
- John en Marsha (1977–1990) - Guest
- C.U.T.E. (1977)
- Joey & Son (1980)
- T.O.D.A.S.: Television's Outrageously Delightful All-Star Show (1987–1989)
- Plaza 1899 (1987)
- TVJ: Television Jesters (1989)
- Maricel Drama Special (1989)
- The Dawn & Jimmy Show (1989)
- Idol Si Pidol (1992)
- Gabi ni Dolphy (1992)
- Doon Po Sa Amin (1993)
- Vilma On Seven (1993)
- Purungtong (1993)
- T.S.C.S. (The Sharon Cuneta Show) (1993–1995)
- Rock & Roll 2000 (ABC)
- Stay Awake (ABC)
- Lovingly Yours, Helen
- Eat Bulaga! (1983–2022, 2023–2024)
- GMA Telesine Specials
- Coney Reyes on Camera
- Oki Doki Doc (1993)
- Mikee (1994)
- Spotlight Drama Specials (1995)
- Dear Mikee (1998)
- GMA Love Stories (1999)
- Campus Romance (2000)
- Idol Ko si Kap (2001)
- True Love: Eat Bulaga Special (2005) (TV)
- Magpakailanman: The Yoyoy Villame Story (2005)
- A Telefantastic Christmas: The GMA All-Star Spcecial (2005) (TV)
- Ganyan Kita Kamahal: Eat Bulaga Special (2007) (TV)
- Bahay Mo Ba 'To? (2007) (TV)
- Ang Mga Anak Ng Maestro: Eat Bulaga Special (2008) (TV)
- Obra Presents (2008)
- Maynila (2009)
- Love Bug Presents (2010)
- Talentadong Pinoy (2010)
- Pepito Manaloto (2011)
- 5 Star Specials (2011)
- Maalaala Mo Kaya: "Langis" (2011)
- Gandang Gabi, Vice (2011)
- The Jose and Wally Show Starring Vic Sotto (2011–2012)
- Mars (GMA News TV, 2012)
- Vampire ang Daddy Ko (March 9, 2013 – June 12, 2016)
- Anyo Ng Pag-Ibig: Eat Bulaga Lenten Drama Special 2014 (2014 Post Production)
- Biro Ng Kapalaran: Eat Bulaga Lenten Drama Special 2015 (2015 Post Production)
- Sabado Badoo (2015) - cameo guest featured footage
- Dear Uge (2016)
- Hay, Bahay! (2017)
- Daddy's Gurl (2018)
- The Boobay and Tekla Show (2019)
- Ikigai: Eat Bulaga Lenten Drama Special 2019 (2019 Post Production) - shot entirely in Tokyo, Japan
- Mars Pa More (2020) - guest
- All-Out Sundays (2020) - guest
- Fill in the Bank (2021)
- Bawal Na Game Show (2021)
- Walang Matigas na Pulis sa Matinik na Misis (2023)
- E.A.T... (2023)
