= Bert de Leon =

Filipino director (1947–2021)

- Born: Lamberto De Leon; May 28, 1947
- Died: November 21, 2021 (aged 74); Taguig, Philippines
- Occupation: Television director
- Years active: 1970s–2021
- Notable work: The Sharon Cuneta Show; Bubble Gang; Eat Bulaga!; Anna Karenina; T.G.I.S.; Okay Ka, Fairy Ko!; Pepito Manaloto

Lamberto de Leon (May 28, 1947 – November 21, 2021) was a Filipino television director.

De Leon was known for directing some of the longest-running shows in the Philippines, Eat Bulaga!, Bubble Gang and Pepito Manaloto.

== Career ==
=== Directorial ===
De Leon is known for directing various television series for GMA Network such as Bubble Gang, Pepito Manaloto, Eat Bulaga!, Anna Karenina, T.G.I.S. and Okay Ka, Fairy Ko!. He also directed shows for other networks. He directed the ABC 5; Pops! of Pops Fernandez and Look Who’s Talking. De Leon also directed Iskul Bukol, TODAS, VIP with Vilma Santos, and The Sharon Cuneta Show.

De Leon inherited the directorial role for Bubble Gang when his predecessor Uro dela Cruz died in February 2016.

His last work would be the prequel Pepito Manaloto: Ang Unang Kuwento which was in production as of 2021.

=== Musical career ===
De Leon was also part of a four-member acoustic band, Area One. He scouted the pop band Side A for Ivory Music.

== Personal life ==
His health deteriorated in 2021; he suffered a heart attack in July which required him to undergo an angiogram and angioplasty, and contracted COVID-19 amidst a pandemic of the disease in October, which led to colleagues Michael V. and Ronnie Henares to host a fundraising for him. He died at the St. Luke's Medical Center in Taguig on November 21, 2021, from COVID-19.

De Leon had a partner, Annalyn Nakpil Jomeo, with whom he had one daughter.
