= Tito Sotto =

Filipino politician and television personality (born 1948)

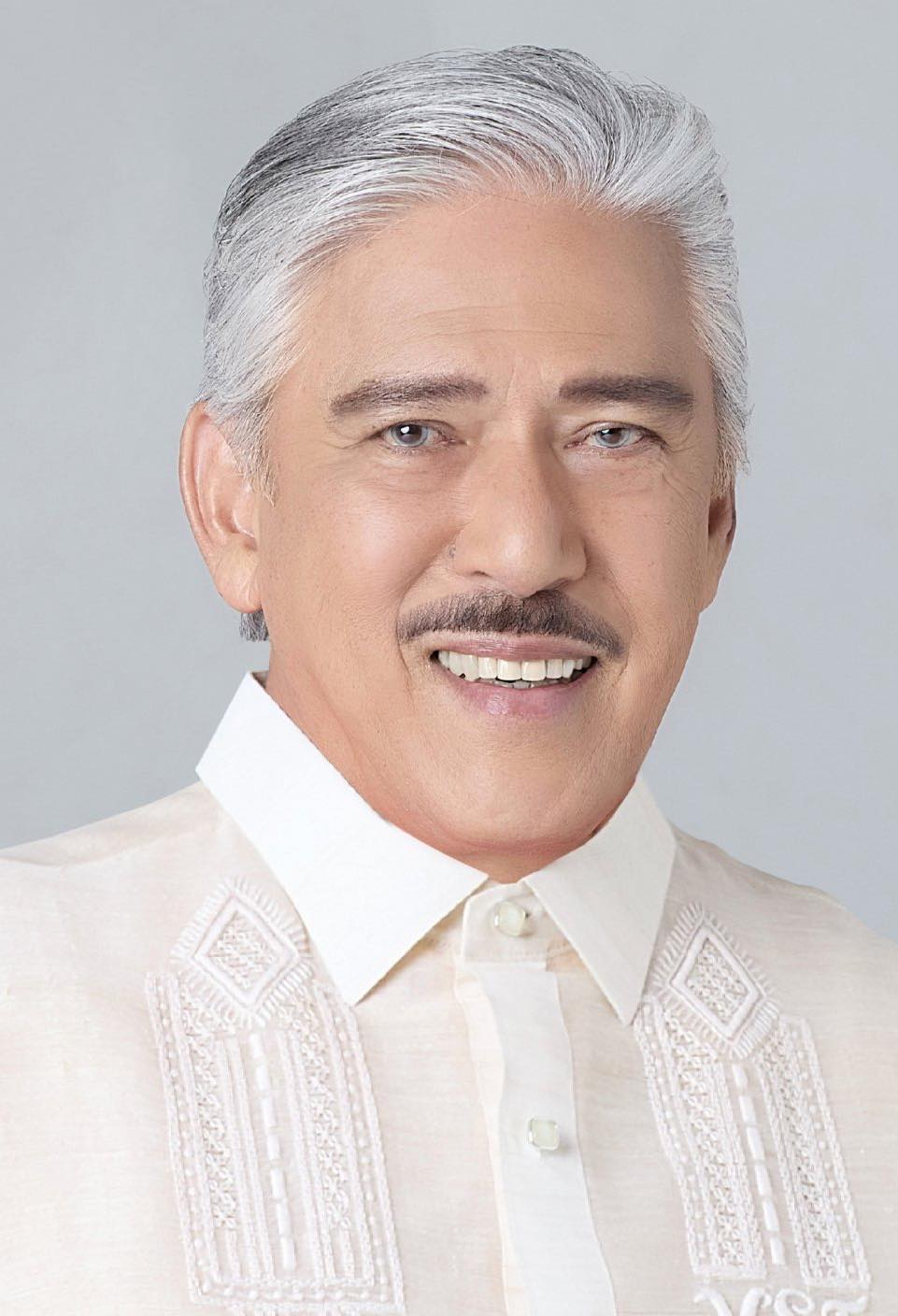
- Official portrait, 2025

29th & 32nd President of the Senate of the Philippines
- In office September 8, 2025 – May 11, 2026
- Preceded by: Francis Escudero
- Succeeded by: Alan Peter Cayetano
- In office May 21, 2018 – June 30, 2022
- Preceded by: Koko Pimentel
- Succeeded by: Juan Miguel Zubiri

President pro tempore of the Senate of the Philippines
- Incumbent
- Assumed office June 17, 2026
- Preceded by: Sherwin Gatchalian

Senate Minority Leader
- In office May 11, 2026 – June 3, 2026
- Preceded by: Alan Peter Cayetano
- Succeeded by: Alan Peter Cayetano
- In office July 28, 2025 – September 8, 2025
- Preceded by: Koko Pimentel
- Succeeded by: Alan Peter Cayetano
- In office July 28, 2014 – August 24, 2015
- Preceded by: Juan Ponce Enrile
- Succeeded by: Juan Ponce Enrile
- In office June 3, 2002 – June 30, 2004
- Preceded by: Nene Pimentel
- Succeeded by: Nene Pimentel

Senator of the Philippines
- Incumbent
- Assumed office June 30, 2025
- In office June 30, 2010 – June 30, 2022
- In office June 30, 1992 – June 30, 2004

Senate Majority Leader
- In office July 25, 2016 – May 21, 2018
- Preceded by: Alan Peter Cayetano
- Succeeded by: Juan Miguel Zubiri
- In office July 26, 2010 – June 6, 2013
- Preceded by: Juan Miguel Zubiri
- Succeeded by: Gregorio Honasan (acting)

Chairman of the Dangerous Drugs Board
- In office July 2008 – November 2009
- President: Gloria Macapagal Arroyo
- Preceded by: Anselmo Avenido Jr.
- Succeeded by: Antonio Villar Jr.

12th Vice Mayor of Quezon City
- In office February 2, 1988 – January 1, 1992
- Mayor: Brigido Simon Jr.
- Preceded by: Amado Zabala (OIC)
- Succeeded by: Alicia Herrera (OIC)

Personal details
- Born: Vicente Castelo Sotto III; August 24, 1948 (age 78) Manila, Philippines
- Party: NPC (2007–present)
- Other political affiliations: LDP (1988–1997; 1998–2007); KAMPI (1997–1998)
- Spouse: Helen Gamboa (m. 1969)
- Children: 4 (including Lala, Gian and Ciara)
- Relatives: Sotto family
- Education: Colegio de San Juan de Letran (BA)
- Occupation: Politician; record producer; composer; songwriter; television host; actor

Military service
- Allegiance: Philippines
- Branch/service: Philippine Army
- Years of service: 2013–present
- Rank: Lieutenant Colonel
- Commands: 1502nd Infantry Brigade (Ready Reserve)
- Musical career
- Also known as: Tito Sen
- Genres: OPM, Manila sound
- Instruments: Vocals
- Years active: 1960–1988
- Label: Vicor
- Formerly of: VST & Company
- Sports career
- Country: Philippines
- Sport: Bowling
Medal record
Representing Philippines
Men's Bowling
Asian Games
| Bronze medal – third place | 1978 Bangkok | Trios |

Vicente "Tito" Castelo Sotto III (Tagalog pronunciation: [ˈsɔtɔ]; born August 24, 1948) is a Filipino politician and television personality who has served as the president pro tempore of the Senate of the Philippines since 2026. He previously served as the 32nd president of the Senate of the Philippines from 2025 until 2026, a position he previously held from 2018 to 2022. Sotto has been a senator since 2025, having previously also served in the role from 1992 to 2004 and from 2010 to 2022. He is the longest-serving Philippine senator in history, the only one elected for five non-consecutive terms, and the second Philippine senator in history to have held all four major leadership positions in the Senate.

During his tenure in the upper chamber, he served as Senate majority leader and Senate minority leader before becoming Senate president. In between his Senate tenures, he led the Dangerous Drugs Board for a year. He served as the vice mayor of Quezon City from 1988 to 1992, and unsuccessfully ran for vice president in the 2022 elections as Panfilo Lacson's running mate.

Beyond politics, Sotto is a songwriter, known for founding the iconic musical group VST & Co. alongside his brothers Vic and Val Sotto, which is considered one of the best Filipino bands of all time and the "pioneer of the Manila sound". In television, he is known as one of the pioneer hosts of Eat Bulaga!, the longest-running variety show and the longest-running entertainment program in Philippine television history, and has appeared in numerous television shows and films as an actor. He is colloquially dubbed "Tito Sen" by the audience.

Sotto was also an athlete. He was a member of the Philippine national bowling team, representing the country several times at the AMF World Cup. He won a bronze medal in the 1978 Asian Games.

== Early life and education ==
Vicente Castelo Sotto III was born on August 24, 1948 to Marcelino Antonio "Nonong" O. Sotto Sr. (1916–1999) of Cebu and Dr. Herminia Castelo-Sotto, who hails from Cabanatuan. His siblings are Valmar (born 1945), Marvic Valentin (born 1954), and Marcelino Antonio C. Sotto, Jr. (born 1951).

Sotto's paternal grandfather and namesake was former senator Vicente Sotto (1877–1950), the main author of the Press Freedom Law, whose brother, Filemon Sotto (1872–1966) also served as a senator and was one of those who drafted the 1935 Constitution.

Sotto studied at Colegio de San Juan de Letran in Intramuros, Manila for his elementary, high school, and college education, earning a Bachelor of Arts degree, majoring in English.

== Entertainment career ==
Sotto's career started in the 1960s when he joined the combo Tilt Down Men; one of its members was his brother Val. The band played covers of the Dave Clark Five and later he became the vice president of Vicor Music Corporation. Vicor founder Orly Ilacad also had a career in the 1960s like Sotto, Orly Ilacad & the Ramrods. In 1977, he was the vocalist for the short-lived group Bluejeans. He wrote the music for "Balatkayo" by Anthony Castelo which was Castelo's hit. He also formed the Manila sound group VST & Company on which the meaning of VST were his initials. Among his notable compositions is "Magkaisa", which is recognized as one of the anthems of the 1986 People Power Revolution.

== Vice Mayor of Quezon City (1988–1992) ==
Sotto was vice mayor of Quezon City from 1988 to 1992. He founded the Vice-Mayors' League of the Philippines and served as its first president. During this period, Sotto was also named Vice Chairman of Citizens' Drugwatch.

== Senate of the Philippines (1992–2004) ==
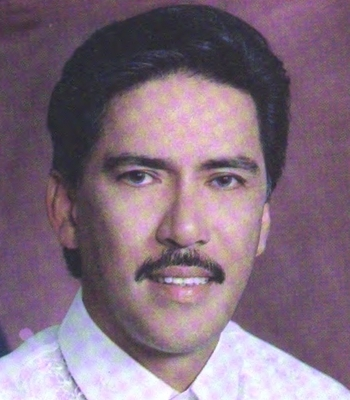
Official portrait of Sotto during the 10th Congress

Sotto was elected to the Senate of the Philippines in the 1992 senatorial election, topping the tally with nearly 12 million votes, more than 3 million more than his second place ranker. This made him the third member of his family to enter the Senate, after his grandfather Vicente Y. Sotto, Sr. and granduncle Felimon Y. Sotto. He served as Assistant Majority Floor Leader, was a member of the Commission on Appointments, and served as chairman on several Senate committees. In the 1998 senatorial election, Sotto earned another term in the Senate with a third place finish, the best result among senators vying for re-election.

From April 30 to May 1, 2001, together with Juan Ponce Enrile, Gregorio Honasan, Panfilo Lacson and Miriam Defensor Santiago, he led the EDSA III protests in support of Joseph Estrada. On May 1, 2001, the protesters stormed Malacañang Palace.

In spite of this, he ran for another term in the Senate in 2007 under the TEAM Unity coalition backed by the Arroyo administration, but was unsuccessful, finishing in 19th place.

== Chairman of the Dangerous Drugs Board (2008–2009) ==
Sotto was appointed by President Gloria Macapagal Arroyo as a member of the board of directors and acting chairman of the Dangerous Drugs Board on July 4, 2008, succeeding Anselmo Avenido whose term was expiring that day. The appointment was just over one year after his failed 2007 senatorial bid. Philippine election laws forbid defeated candidates from being appointed to government posts within a year of the election. He served until November 2009.

== Senate of the Philippines (2010–2022) ==
In late 2009, he resigned as chair of the Dangerous Drugs Board to file his certificate of candidacy as Senator, seeking a comeback to the Senate. He ran under the Nationalist People's Coalition party but campaigned alone because he was not included on any ticket. During the campaign period, he was notably endorsed by Kris Aquino.

After the conclusion of the 2010 Philippine Senate election, Sotto won a seat and placed ninth among twelve winning candidates with roughly twelve million votes, giving him his third non-consecutive term in the upper house.

Upon the commencement of the 15th Congress on July 26, 2010, he was elected by the majority of his fellow senators as the Majority Leader of the Senate as well as the Chairman of its Committee on Rules, thus he manages the legislative affairs of the Senate, particularly on the floor during the sessions. He was also one of the 20 senators that voted to convict Chief Justice Renato Corona and to remove him from office on May 29 of that year.

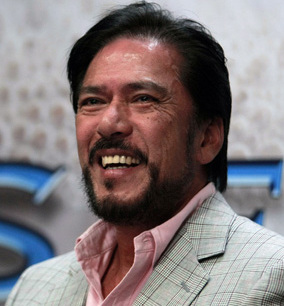
Sotto in 2012

In July 2013, at the end of the 15th Congress, Sotto resigned as the Majority Leader following the resignation of Juan Ponce Enrile, his staunch political mentor, as Senate President. Enrile resigned due to allegations of misusing the Senate funds. Then assistant majority leader Senator Gregorio Honasan became the acting Majority Leader following Sotto's resignation.

On the commencement of the session of the 16th Congress, on July 22, 2013, Sotto became part of the new Senate minority group. He was chosen by his colleagues in the minority to be the Deputy Floor Leader, second-in-command to Enrile who became the Minority Leader. In July 2014, following Enrile's arrest on charges of plunder relating to the pork barrel scam, Sotto became the acting Minority Floor Leader. Enrile resumed his position as the Minority Floor Leader after he was granted bail by the Supreme Court in August 2015.

In 2013, Sotto filed a bill that would mandate all government and non-government employees to receive a 14th month of annual salary. Responding to the Department of Labor and Employment claims that the bill would worsen unemployment if implemented, Sotto said that the existing 13th month pay is not truly a bonus because there are actually 13 months in a year. "There are 52 weeks in a year divide it by four weeks in a month. Thirteen months."

=== President of the Senate (2018–2022) ===
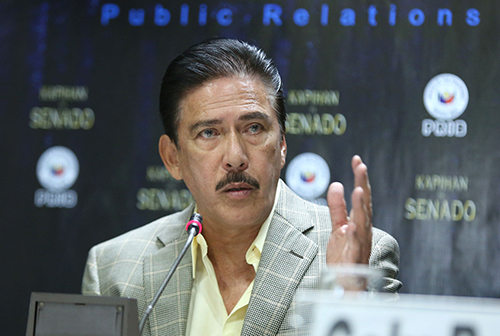
Sotto in 2016

Sotto was re-elected in the 2016 elections. With 17.2 million votes, he finished in third place for the twelve contested senate seats. On July 25, 2016, during the opening of the 17th Congress, Sotto was again elected as Majority Leader. He was also elected as chairman of the Senate committee on rules and the Senate committee on ethics and privileges. Being a member of the NPC, Sotto is part of the "supermajority" coalition led by the PDP–Laban, the political party of President Rodrigo Duterte and Senate President Aquilino Pimentel III.

Sotto has expressed his support for the revival of the death penalty for "high level drug trafficking".

On May 3, 2017, during the Commission on Appointments' (CA) hearing on Judy Taguiwalo's appointment as Secretary of Social Welfare and Development, Sotto, a member of the CA, made controversial remarks which seemed to belittle Taguiwalo for being a single parent.

One of Taguiwalo's daughters demanded a public apology from Sotto over his offensive remarks, asserting that "no woman deserves that kind of treatment". The Gabriela Women's Party also demanded a public apology, claiming that Sotto "went out of bounds" insulting solo parents and insinuating malice at Taguiwalo. The Commission on Human Rights condemned the remarks, saying: "It is deplorable that such a comment came from an elected senator and that it elicited laughter from the halls of the Congress. The incident shows how those charged by law to protect women from discrimination often forget and unwittingly become promoters of discrimination themselves". A statement from the Philippine Commission on Women called the incident "a mockery of a woman's circumstance as a solo parent as [the] status has nothing to do with her professional qualifications." Representatives Antonio Tinio (ACT Teachers Partylist) and Ariel Casilao (Anakpawis) deprecated the behavior of their colleagues in Congress for tolerating Sotto's remarks. Filipino netizens also criticized Sotto, who became a trending topic on Twitter that day. Some social media users even reminded him that his daughter, Ciara Sotto, is also a single mother. Singer-actress Lea Salonga, who was single-handedly raised by her mother, decried Sotto's remarks. Celebrity single mothers Pokwang, LJ Reyes, Geneva Cruz, and Claudine Barretto also denounced Sotto's remarks and expressed support for single mothers.

In an interview after the hearing, Sotto apologized and claimed that Taguiwalo was not offended by his remarks. He reasoned that perhaps people were just "overly sensitive" and did not "understand the joke". He also added:

I will be the last person in this country to disrespect a woman because my mother was one of the founders of the Women's Rights Movement … I have two daughters who are separated, single, and have children so I don't think there should be big fuss about it.

On May 4, Secretary Judy Taguiwalo accepted Sotto's apology, but clarified that "the apology does not fully capture the extent of the gravity of what his 'joke' implied." She also asserted that despite accepting Sotto's apology, she will not tolerate misogyny, anti-women comments, and attacks towards solo parents. Taguiwalo also thanked Sotto for supporting her confirmation as DSWD secretary. She, however, also thanked those who expressed their condemnation of Sotto's statements, and those who supported her and all solo parents.

Despite Sotto's apology, and Taguiwalo's acceptance thereof, eight women's and workers' groups filed an ethics complaint against the senator on May 10, 2017. Among these groups were Coalition Against Trafficking in Women – Asia Pacific and Partido ng Manggagawa. The said groups claimed that the aforementioned apology was insincere and that Sotto normalized patriarchal views and trivialized the abandonment of responsibility over children. The complaint was filed with the Senate committee on ethics and privileges, of which Sotto is the chairman. Sotto welcomed the complaint and declared his intention to go on leave from his committee as soon as he receives the complaint officially.

On May 9, the Federation of Solo Parents in Luz vi min (FSPL) approached Senator Sotto in his office and requested his support for the passage of amendments to Republic Act No. 8972, or the Solo Parents Welfare Act of 2000. These amendments included discounts on medicine, hospitalization fees, clothing, tuition, milk, and vitamins for solo parents and their children. In a statement, Sotto said that he is "ready and willing" to fight for the rights of single parents and assured the group that the amendments will be passed before December 2017.

On August 7, 2017, Sotto filed a resolution for the Senate Blue Ribbon committee to investigate the alleged unexplained wealth of Commission on Elections Chairman Andres Bautista.

At the start of the 18th Congress in 2019, Sotto regained his position as the 3rd highest ranking official in the Philippine government after he was re-elected as its Senate President. Sen. Panfilo Lacson administered the oath of Sotto. In his valedictory speech, he emphasized that the Senate will continue to be as independent but yet cooperative in the plans of the Duterte administration. Sotto, who served as Majority Floor Leader in his years way back in the Senate secured the support of his co-senators especially those in the majority. On the other hand, Senators Ralph Recto, Migz Zubiri and Franklin Drilon also regained their post after they were re-elected as Senate President Pro-Tempore, Majority Floor Leader and Minority Floor Leader, respectively.

== 2022 vice presidential campaign ==
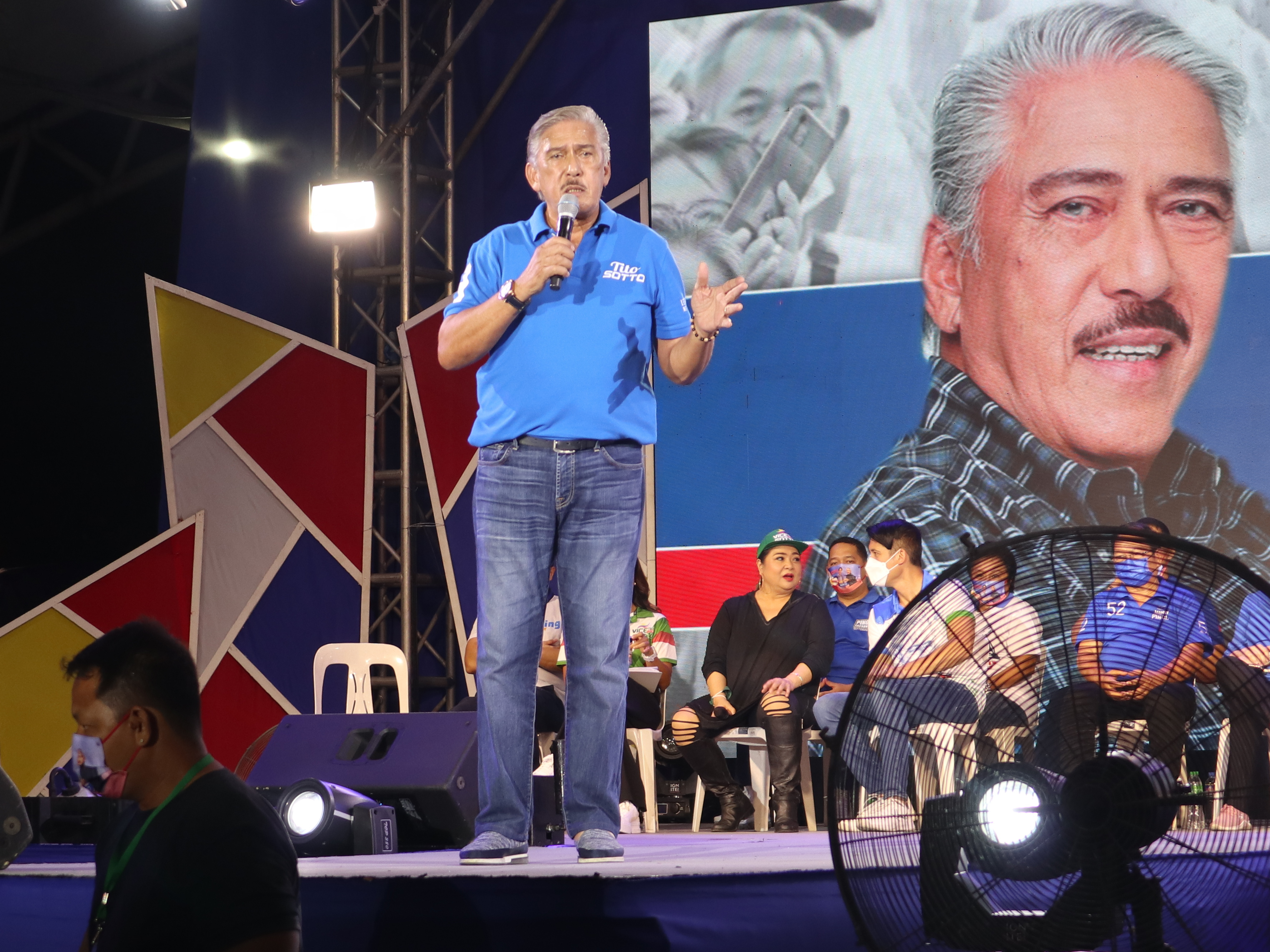
Sotto speaking at a campaign rally at Quezon Memorial Circle, Quezon City on April 9, 2022

On March 23, 2021, Sotto stated that he and fellow Senator Panfilo Lacson were being persuaded to form a tandem, but the two senior legislators were still reluctant on deciding if they will file a candidacy together or individually, and when he was asked in an interview if he would run for higher office in the coming elections since he is term-limited and barred from running a third consecutive term as Senator, Sotto said that he is still undecided.

In May 2021, Sotto revealed his contemplation on running for vice president in 2022 during a television interview on the ABS-CBN News Channel (ANC). Later on June 7, Sotto declared that if Panfilo Lacson decides to run for president in the 2022 election, he will "definitely" run as vice president in tandem with Lacson. By July 20, Sotto and Lacson made a press release revealing that they will run as a tandem in 2022, with the formal launch of their candidacies being held on September 8, the first campaign launch to be taped and edited before broadcast in Philippine history.

Sotto and Lacson's platforms include restoring trust in the government and a better lifestyle for Filipinos, with solutions that revolved around addressing corruption. Sotto and Lacson planned to initiate an anti-corruption drive, reform the national budget, and digitalize government services.

Sotto placed third in the unofficial tally, and lost to Davao City Mayor Sara Duterte. On the next day, Sotto conceded, being quoted "The people have made their choice. I accept the will of the People," he said. Meanwhile his running mate Lacson, on the other hand, also lost his bid for president to Bongbong Marcos, placing fifth with nearly a million votes.

== Return to the Senate (2025–present) ==
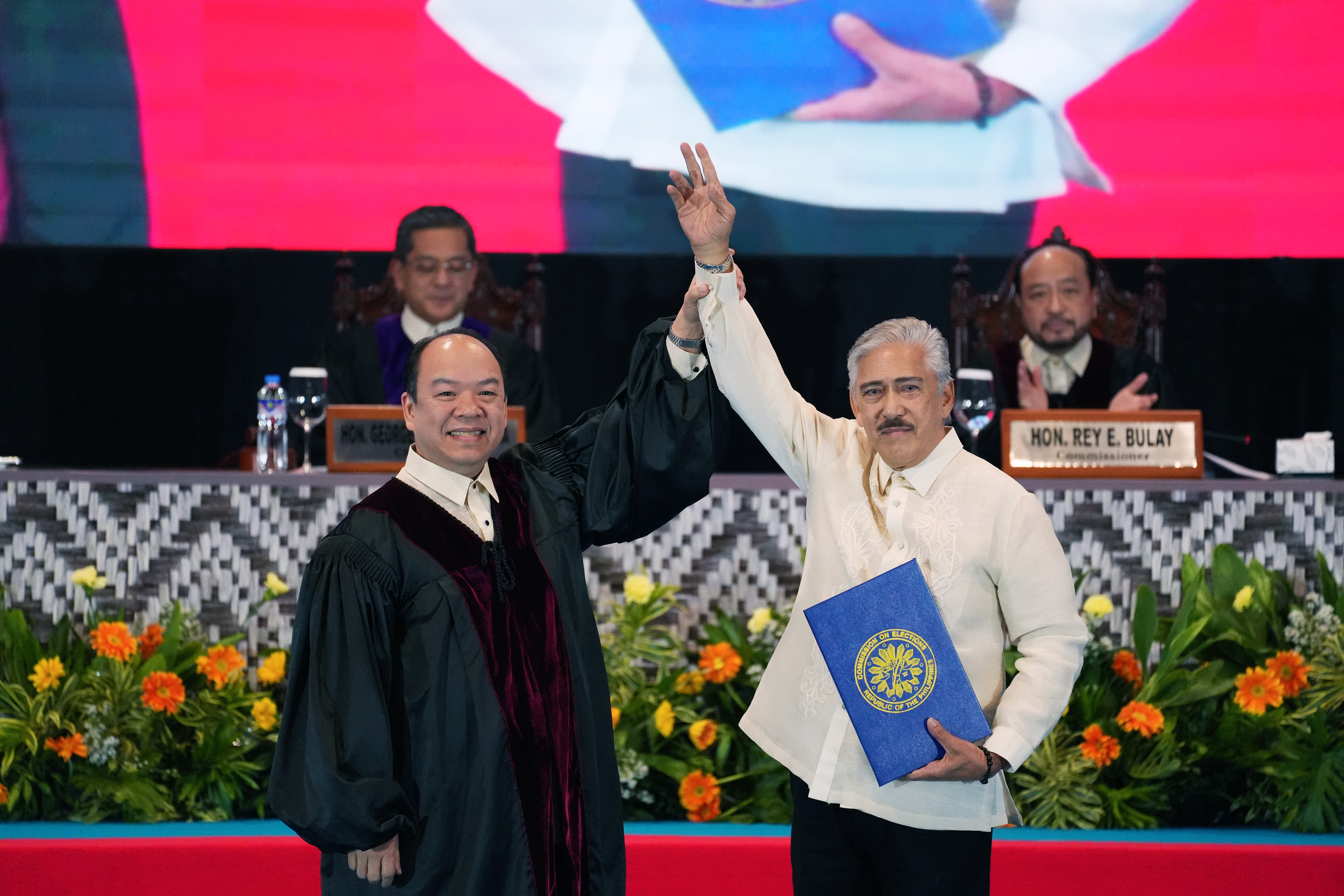
Sotto being proclaimed as a senator-elect on May 17, 2025

After his unsuccessful bid for vice president in the 2022 national elections, Sotto filed his certificate of candidacy (COC) on October 2, 2024 for a return to the Senate in the 2025 midterm elections. He ran under Alyansa para sa Bagong Pilipinas, rejoining the political arena. In the May 2025 elections, Sotto was elected as one of the twelve senators under the Alyansa Para sa Bagong Pilipinas slate.

=== Minority leader (2025) ===
When the 20th Congress convened on 28 July 2025, Sotto ran for Senate president but was defeated by Francis Escudero, who was re-elected with 19 votes to Sotto's 5. Following that, Sotto became Senate minority leader.

As Senate minority leader, Sotto opposed a motion to archive the first impeachment of Sara Duterte. He was one of four senators (the others being Risa Hontiveros, Kiko Pangilinan, and Bam Aquino), following a Supreme Court ruling that declared the complaint null and void ab initio and held that the Senate did not acquire jurisdiction.

=== Senate president (2025–2026) ===
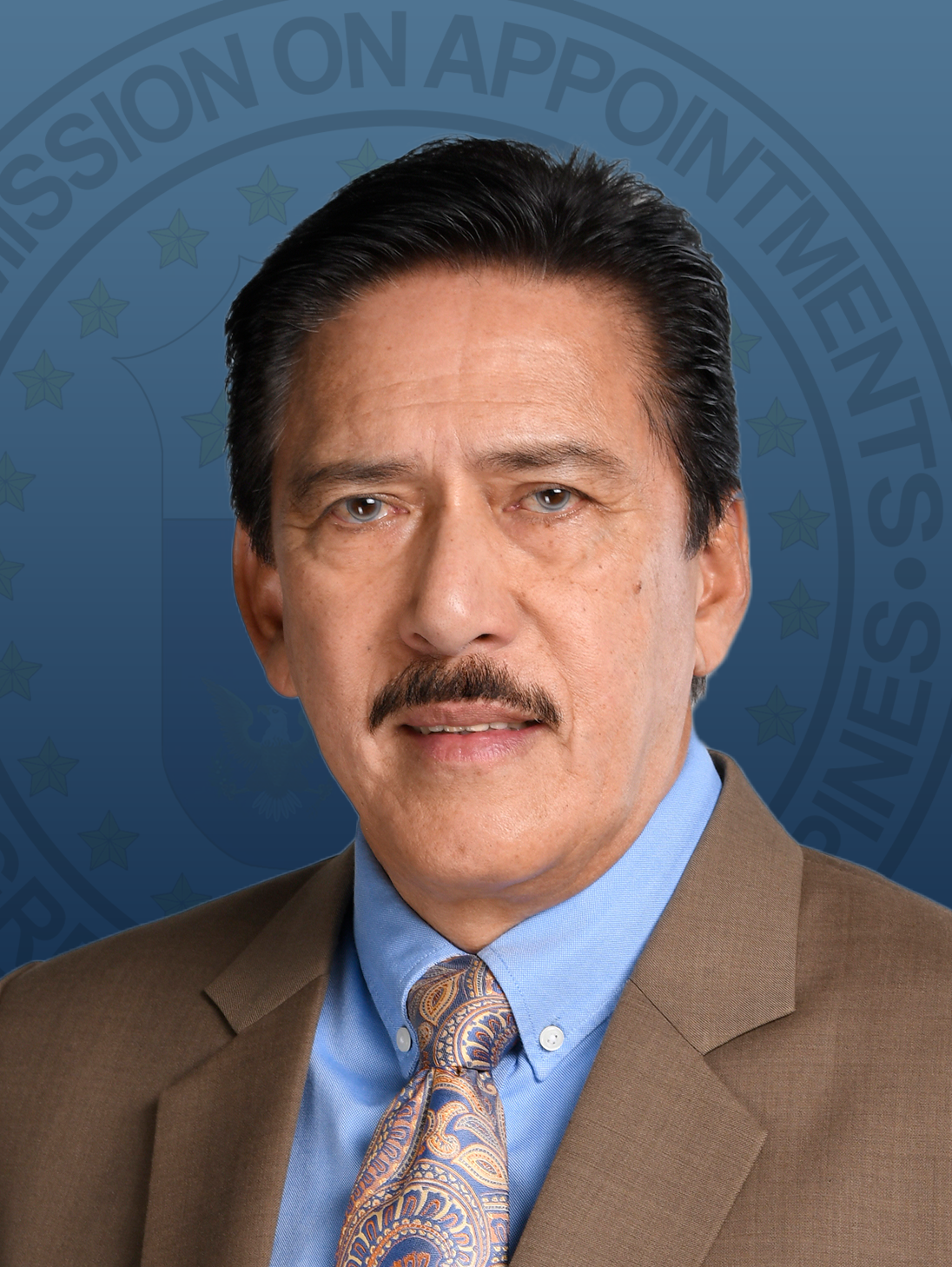
Sotto's Commission on Appointments portrait for the 20th Congress

On September 8, 2025, a motion was filed and approved to declare the position of Senate president vacant. Sotto was nominated by Juan Miguel Zubiri as the sole nominee, and was elected by acclamation to the Senate presidency, with fifteen senators voting in his favor.

Sotto committed to continuing Senate investigations into alleged anomalies in flood control infrastructure projects, even with the existence of the Independent Commission for Infrastructure (ICI) created by President Bongbong Marcos. He said the Senate Blue Ribbon Committee would proceed "in aid of legislation."

On May 11, 2026, Sotto was ousted in a Senate coup staged by the minority bloc and was replaced by Minority Leader Alan Peter Cayetano. He later regained the minority floor leadership. On the first day of the Special Session of Congress called for by President Bongbong Marcos, Sotto was elected as Senate President Pro Tempore, and took his oath before Senate President Sherwin Gatchalian, whom Sotto succeeded to the post.

== Political positions ==
Sotto has been described as a conservative by the local media because of his positions regarding social issues, owing to his Roman Catholic background. He has vocally expressed his opposition against measures on reproductive health and women's rights.

Sotto had been pushing for the restoration of the death penalty since he took office as a senator in 1992. He changed his stance on the penalty in 2021 when he entered the vice-presidential race in the upcoming 2022 presidential election, believing life imprisonment to be a better alternative. He and his presidential running mate Panfilo Lacson agree that the issue should be concentrated on improving jail conditions, advocating the construction of regional penitentiaries where criminals convicted of a heinous crime could be incarcerated if not in New Bilibid Prison.

== Controversies ==
=== Issues surrounding the Pepsi Paloma rape case ===
In 1982, the 15-year-old actress Pepsi Paloma accused Sotto's brother Vic Sotto and comedians Joey de Leon and Richie D'Horsie of gang raping and taking photos of her on June 21 in a room at the Sulo Hotel in Quezon City. On July 31, Rey dela Cruz, Paloma's talent manager, lodged a formal complaint with Defense Minister Juan Ponce Enrile. On August 18, Paloma filed charges of rape and acts of lasciviousness against the three television personalities before the Quezon City fiscal's office. The crime of rape at the time, carried the death penalty in the Philippines, and to prevent his brother and cohorts from being sent to the electric chair, Sotto quickly went to see Paloma while she was still securing the services of Atty. Rene Cayetano. According to Paloma, Sotto coerced her into signing an "Affidavit of Desistance" to drop the rape charges against his brother and cohorts—Sotto had allegedly placed a pistol on the table in front of Paloma when he went to talk to her.

In exchange for the dismissal of the charges of rape, the accused issued a public apology towards Paloma, stating:

"We hope that you will not allow the error we have committed against you to stand as a stumbling block to that future which we all look forward to. We therefore ask you to find it in your heart to pardon us for the wrong which we have done against you."

Three years later, Paloma was found dead in an apparent suicide. Dela Cruz was murdered years later.

On May 29, 2018, Sotto made a request to the online news site Inquirer.net to have the March 2014 articles by United States-based columnist Rodel Rodis removed: "The rape of Pepsi Paloma" and "Was Pepsi Paloma murdered?". The articles stated that he used his political connections to influence the outcome of the Pepsi Paloma rape case. After 34 years, in March 2016, Sotto denied involvement in the Pepsi Paloma rape case, stating that it was a gimmick of Dela Cruz.

In response, the National Union of Journalists of the Philippines (NUJP) asked, "Does he believe his status and authority as Senate President give him better chances of having the stories taken down?"

On July 4, 2018, Inquirer.net took down the articles that Sotto had requested to be removed from their website. The NUJP condemned the takedown and issued a statement calling it "one of the darkest days in the annals of Philippine journalism".

As an unintended example of the Streisand effect, Sotto's takedown request of the Inquirer.net articles renewed public interest in the Paloma gang rape case.

=== Accusations of plagiarism ===
In 2012, Sotto was accused of plagiarizing several passages in a speech opposing the Reproductive Health Bill in the Philippine Senate. Several news agencies reported that Sotto had taken the passages from a 2011 blog entry by Sarah Pope. Sotto asserted that he was quoting Natasha Campbell-McBride, who was referenced in the blog post. Pope, upon learning of the controversy, confirmed Sotto's plagiarism on August 16, 2012 in another entry to her blog, strongly criticizing Sotto for the plagiarism, for denying it, and for his stance on contraceptives. She also remarked that she did not intend to sue. Meanwhile, Sotto's chief of staff admitted to using the blog post and failing to attribute Pope's work. Pope responded to the comment again criticizing Sotto's stance on the Reproductive Health Bill. On August 17, Sotto reasserted his defense saying: "I made a blanket disclosure. I mentioned beforehand my attributions, that I had many sources (of information in my speech) so I have admitted that. I have made a disclosure, so what's their problem with that? They probably thought I'm trying to pass myself off as knowledgeable (on the subject) when in fact I'm not, supposedly, Where is the plagiarism there? They think that's plagiarism. So come on, sue me." Villacorta said he saw nothing wrong with using Pope's blog without attribution because it "is public domain" and "blogs are not covered by copyright. It is a new media and there is no jurisprudence yet."

A few days later, South China Morning Post journalist, Raissa Robles also called out Sotto for plagiarizing five bloggers and a briefing paper – which includes a blog titled The Truth of Contraceptives, a blog titled Feminists for Choice, a blog titled Talking Sense by Marlon Ramirez, a New York University blog publishing works by birth control activist Margaret Sanger, and a briefing paper published by the Catholic Family and Human Rights Institute. Robles also remarked that Sotto would be championing digital piracy, she remarked: "Atty. Villacorta said that the Internet is free. (sic) This would mean that Senator Sotto would be championing digital piracy"

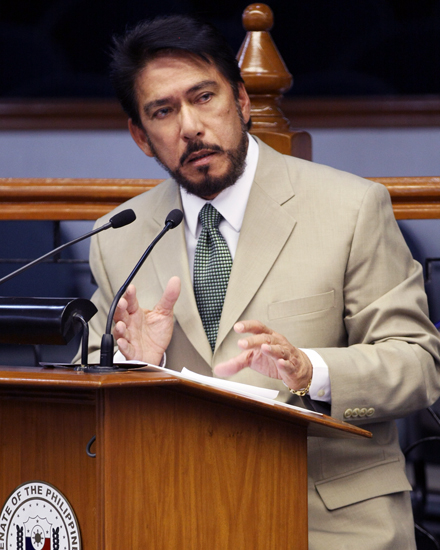
Sotto in 2012

On November 9, 2012, Kerry Kennedy, the daughter of late American senator Robert F. Kennedy and president of the Robert F. Kennedy Center for Justice and Human Rights, wrote a public letter to Senator Sotto accusing him of flagrantly and deceptively plagiarizing the Robert F. Kennedy's 1966 Day of Affirmation speech in his remarks to the Philippine Senate last September 5, 2012. Sotto has since issued an apology to the Kennedy family, but tenaciously refused to admit that he committed plagiarism in his speech. Sotto reasoned that the allegedly plagiarized passage was obtained from a text message sent by a Christian leader, which he then translated into Filipino as he found it fit for his speech without knowing that the words were Kennedy's. He also argued that he never claimed the ideas and words as his own, therefore he did not plagiarize.

Sotto was one of the two senators who have inserted provision on libel under the Cybercrime Prevention Act of 2012 or Anti-Cybercrime Law. However, he denied that he did so in retaliation for the "cyberbullying" he received from Filipino netizens who criticized his alleged plagiarisms. Instead, he claimed that he intended to penalize those who release celebrity sex tapes and to allow the corresponding victims to seek redress.

=== Flood control projects scandal ===
During the Blue Ribbon Committee hearing on June 4, 2026, several individuals presented by former Marines alleged that they had delivered cash-filled suitcases to a number of politicians, including Sotto. One witness that he delivered five suitcases containing between ₱40 million and ₱70 million to Sotto in 2024, before the start of the campaign period.

== Personal life ==
Sotto is married to Helen Gamboa, a beauty queen, actress, and singer on September 22, 1969. They have four children including Gian Carlo and Ciara, and eleven grandchildren, including Vicente "Hugo" Sotto IV. Sotto is a devout Catholic.

Actors Oyo Boy Sotto and Miko Sotto (1982–2003) are his nephews. Singer-actress Sharon Cuneta is also his niece.

In the 2010 elections, his son Gian Carlo was elected councilor of Quezon City's 3rd District and served for three consecutive terms before being elected as the vice mayor of the city in the 2019 elections, while his daughter Diorella Maria "Lala" was elected in the 6th District of the same city before being appointed chairperson of the Movie and Television Review and Classification Board in 2022. His nephews Vico Sotto and Viktor Eriko "Wahoo" Sotto were elected mayor of Pasig and councilor of Parañaque's 2nd District, respectively.

Sotto has enlisted in the military as a reservist in the Philippine Army since 2013, ranked as Lieutenant Colonel.

As of 2016 he was the chairman of the Philippine Bowling Federation (PBF). Sotto also plays golf and has won several tournaments.

== Electoral history ==
Electoral history of Tito Sotto
| Year | Office | Party | Votes received | | | | Result |
| Year | Office | Party | Total | % | P. | Swing | Result |
|---|---|---|---|---|---|---|---|
| 1992 | Senator of the Philippines | LDP | 11,792,121 | 48.62% | 1st | —N/a | Won |
| 1998 | Senator of the Philippines | LDP | 11,520,678 | 39.34% | 3rd | -9.28 | Won |
| 2007 | Senator of the Philippines | NPC | 7,638,361 | 25.89% | 19th | -13.45 | Lost |
| 2010 | Senator of the Philippines | NPC | 11,891,711 | 31.17% | 9th | +5.28 | Won |
| 2016 | Senator of the Philippines | NPC | 17,200,371 | 38.24% | 3rd | +7.07 | Won |
| 2025 | Senator of the Philippines | NPC | 14,832,996 | 25.86% | 8th | -12.38 | Won |
| 2022 | Vice President of the Philippines | NPC | 8,251,267 | 15.67% | 3rd | —N/a | Lost |

== Filmography ==
=== Film ===
==== As actor ====
| Year | Title | Role | Note(s) | Ref(s). |
|---|---|---|---|---|
| 1979 | Swing It... Baby! | | | |
| 1979 | Al Magat's Mang Kepweng | A dwende (dwarf) | | |
| 1980 | Mr. One-Two-Three | Juan | | |
| 1980 | Iskul Bukol (Freshmen) | | | |
| 1981 | Age Doesn't Matter | | Also composer | |
| 1981 | Mr. One-Two-Three Part 2 | Juan | | |
| 1981 | Iskul Bukol 2 (Sophomore) | | | |
| 1985 | Ma'am May We Go Out? | Dennis Soriano | Also composer | |
| 1985 | I Have Three Hands | Jovito "Bitoy" Agatep | Also composer | |
| 1986 | Horsey-Horsey, Tigidig-Tigidig | Johnny | Also composer | |
| 1986 | Send in the Clowns | Robin | | |
| 1987 | Ready!.. Aim!.. Fire!.. | Tyson | Also composer | |
| 1988 | Fly Me to the Moon | Carlo | | |
| 1988 | Wake Up Little Susie | David | | |
| 1988 | Smith & Wesson | | "Special participation" | |
| 1989 | Aso't Pusa | Pamboy | | |
| 1994 | Bawal Na Gamot | Himself | | |
| 2006 | Enteng Kabisote 3: Okay Ka, Fairy Ko: The Legend Goes On and On and On | Nador | | |
| 2008 | Iskul Bukol 20 Years After: The Ungasis and Escaleras Adventure | Tito Escalera | | |

==== As composer only ====
| Year | Title | Note(s) | Ref(s). |
|---|---|---|---|
| 1974 | Bamboo Gods and Iron Men | | |
| 1974 | Fe, Esperanza, Caridad | "Esperanza" segment | |
| 1974 | Dynamite Wong and T.N.T. Jackson | | |
| 1974 | Doctor, Doctor, I Am Sick! | | |
| 1974 | The Exit | | |
| 1976 | The System | | |
| 1976 | The Interceptors | | |
| 1976 | Makahiya at Talahib | | |
| 1977 | The Enforcer and the Pussycats | | |
| 1977 | Sgt. Dalanon | | |
| 1978 | Blind Rage | | |
| 1978 | Kampus? | | |
| 1981 | Kasalanan Ba? | | |
| 1982 | Bilanggo: Prison No. 10069 | | |
| 1982 | Just Say You Love Me | | |
| 1983 | Aguila sa Puting Bato | | |

=== Television ===
| Year | Title | Role |
|---|---|---|
| 1975–1976 | OK Lang! | Himself (host) |
| 1975–1979 | Discorama | Himself (host) |
| 1976–1979 | Student Canteen | Himself (host) |
| 1978–1988 | Iskul Bukol | Tito Escalera |
| 1979–present (Note: Appeared on special occasions only from 1992 until 2023) | Eat Bulaga! | Himself (host) |
| 1983– | Buhok Pinoy | |
| 1987–1989 | Hapi House! | Hapi |
| 1991–1993 | TVJ: Television Jesters | Various |
| 1992–1993 | TVJ on 5 | Various |
| 1994–1995 | Rock and Roll 2000 | Himself |
| 1994–1997 | Mixed N.U.T.S. (Numero Unong Terrific Show!) | Various |
| 1994–2000 | Brigada Siete | Himself (host/anchor) |
| 2023–2024 | Reality Check with Tito Sotto | Himself (host) |

== See also ==
- Pepsi Paloma
- Spoliarium (Eraserheads song)
- The Rapists of Pepsi Paloma (film)

Political offices
| Preceded by Elmer Pormiento; Officer-in-charge | Vice Mayor of Quezon City; 1988–1992 | Succeeded by Alicia Herrera; Officer-in-charge |
| Preceded by Anselmo Avenido Jr. | Chairman of Dangerous Drugs Board; 2008–2009 | Succeeded by Antonio Villar Jr. |
Senate of the Philippines
| Preceded by Aquilino Pimentel, Jr. | Minority Floor Leader of the Senate of the Philippines; 2002–2004 | Succeeded by Aquilino Pimentel, Jr. |
| Preceded by Migz Zubiri | Majority Floor Leader of the Senate of the Philippines; 2010–2013 | Succeeded by Gregorio Honasan; Acting |
| Preceded by Juan Ponce Enrile | Minority Floor Leader of the Senate of the Philippines; Acting; 2014–2015 | Succeeded by Juan Ponce Enrile |
| Preceded by Alan Peter Cayetano | Majority Floor Leader of the Senate of the Philippines; 2016–2018 | Succeeded by Migz Zubiri |
| Preceded by Aquilino Pimentel III | President of the Senate of the Philippines; 2018–2022 | Succeeded by Migz Zubiri |
| Preceded by Aquilino Pimentel III | Minority Floor Leader of the Senate of the Philippines; 2025 | Succeeded by Alan Peter Cayetano |
| Preceded by Francis Escudero | President of the Senate of the Philippines; 2025–2026 | Succeeded by Alan Peter Cayetano |
| Preceded by Alan Peter Cayetano | Minority Floor Leader of the Senate of the Philippines; 2026 | Vacant |
| Preceded by Sherwin Gatchalian | President pro tempore of the Senate of the Philippines; 2026–present | Incumbent |
Party political offices
| Vacant Title last held by Loren Legarda | NPC nominee for Vice President of the Philippines; 2022 | Most recent |
