= Bahay Mo Ba 'To? =

Philippine television sitcom series

- Title card
- Genre: Sitcom
- Directed by: Al Quinn
- Starring: Ronaldo Valdez; Tessie Tomas
- Country of origin: Philippines
- Original language: Tagalog
- No. of episodes: 148

Production
- Camera setup: Multiple-camera setup
- Running time: 34–54 minutes
- Production company: GMA Entertainment TV

Original release
- Network: GMA Network
- Release: September 14, 2004 – July 10, 2007

Bahay Mo Ba 'To? (transl. is this your house?) is a sitcom series broadcast by GMA Network. Starring Ronaldo Valdez, Tessie Tomas and Wendell Ramos, it premiered on September 14, 2004, on the network's KiliTV line up. The series concluded on July 10, 2007, with a total of 148 episodes.

The series is streaming online on YouTube.

== Cast and characters ==
Cast

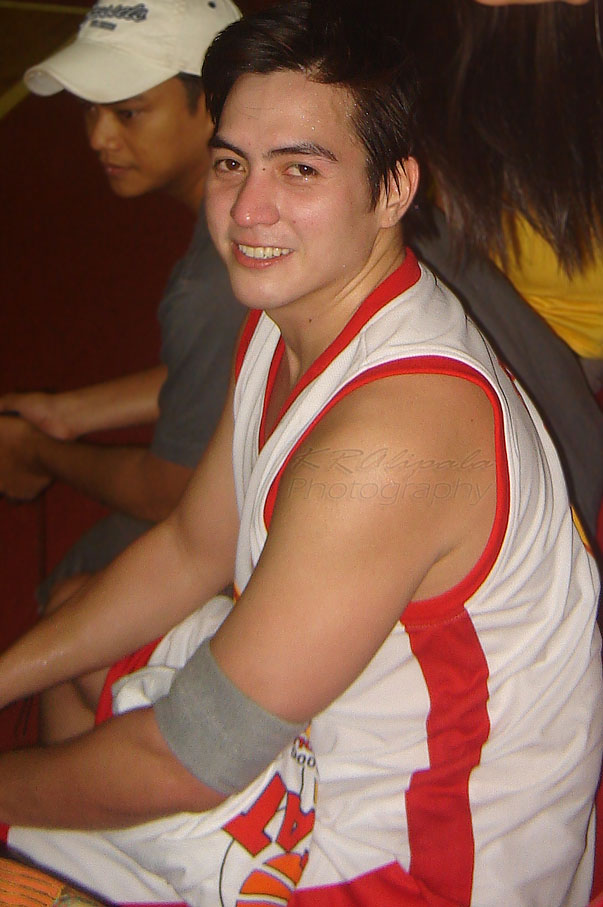
Wendell Ramos

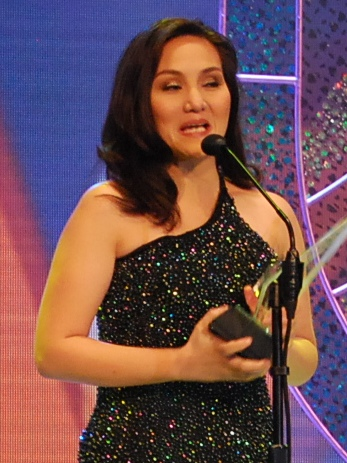
Gladys Reyes

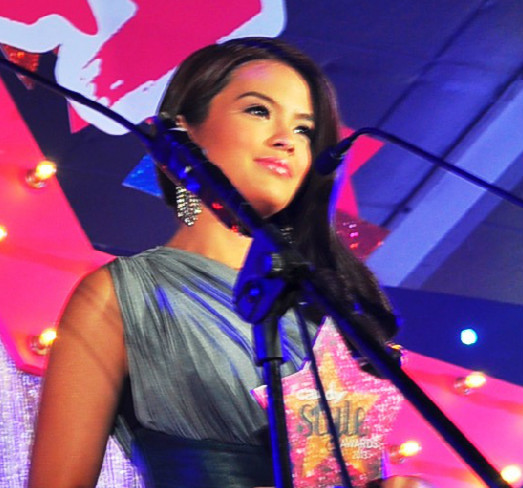
Bea Binene

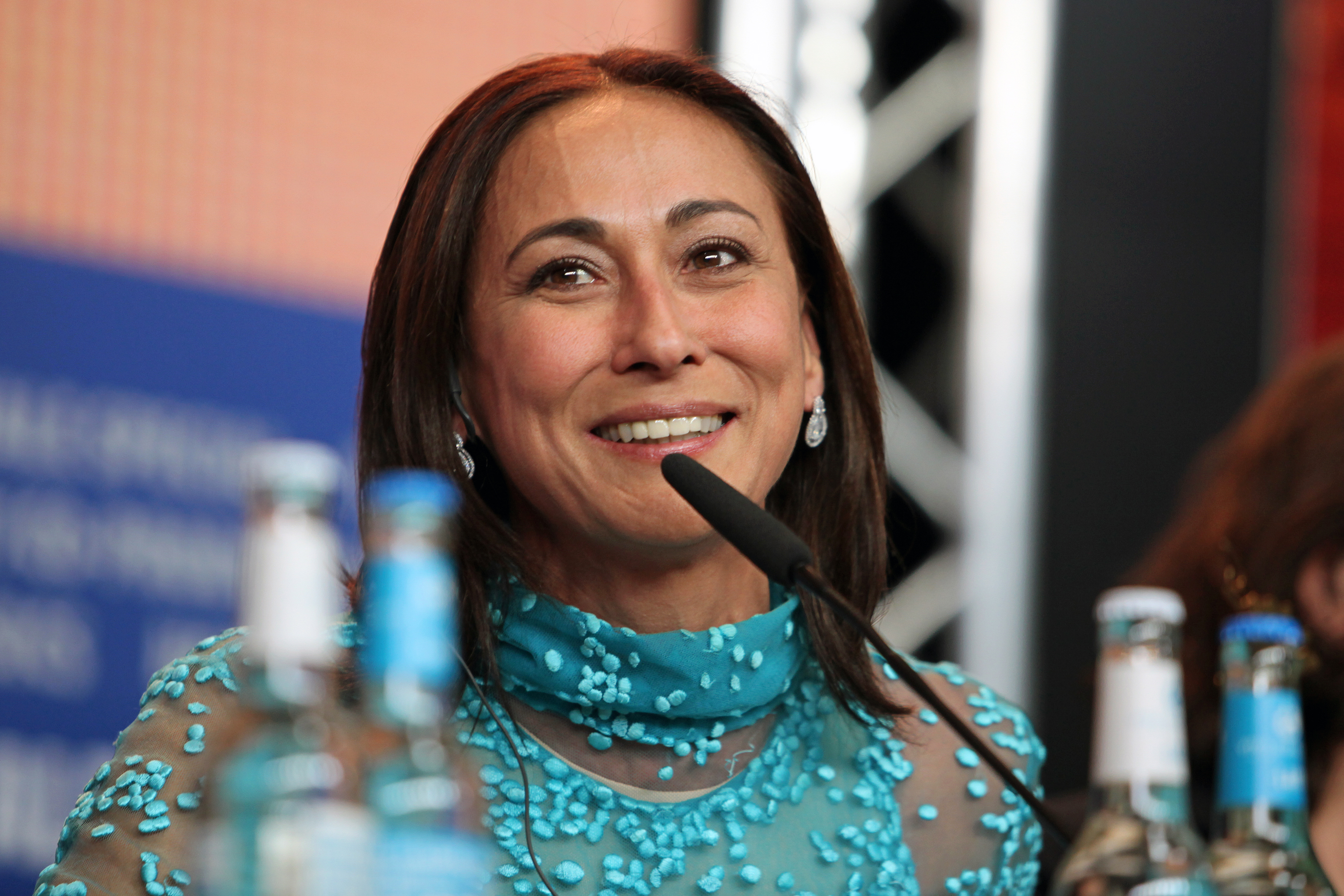
Cherie Gil

Lead cast

- Ronaldo Valdez as Nene Mulingtapang / Unyo
- Tessie Tomas as Baby Mulingtapang-Benoit / Anying

Supporting cast

- Wendell Ramos as Manny Boy Mulingtapang
- Gladys Reyes as Kelly Mulingtapang
- Bea Binene as Junabeth Mulingtapang
- Gabriel Roxas as Julius Mulingtapang
- Sherilyn Reyes as Jessica Benoit
- Sunshine Dizon as Dorothy Benoit / Pirena
- Jacob Chen as Raymond Benoit
- Cherie Gil as Tet Ano
- Keempee de Leon as Harold Mangaluntoy
- Francine Prieto as Jingle
- Tiya Pusit as Bella
- Dino Guevarra as Canor
- Carlito Campos, Jr. as Mang Enriquez
- Chynna Ortaleza as Tintin
- Vincent Enero as Michika

== Accolades ==
Accolades received by Bahay Mo Ba 'To?
Year	Award	Category	Recipient	Result	Ref.
2005	Golden Screen TV Awards	Outstanding Comedy Series	Bahay Mo Ba 'To	Nominated	
2005	Golden Screen TV Awards	Outstanding Director for a Comedy Series/Comedy Gag Show	Al Quinn	Nominated	
2005	Golden Screen TV Awards	Outstanding Lead Actor in a Comedy Series	Ronaldo Valdez	Nominated	
2005	Golden Screen TV Awards	Outstanding Lead Actress in a Comedy Series	Tessie Tomas	Nominated	
2005	Golden Screen TV Awards	Outstanding Supporting Actor in a Comedy Series	Keempee de Leon	Nominated	
2005	Golden Screen TV Awards	Outstanding Supporting Actor in a Comedy Series	Pekto	Nominated	
2005	Golden Screen TV Awards	Outstanding Supporting Actress in a Comedy Series	Francine Prieto	Nominated	
2005	Golden Screen TV Awards	Outstanding Supporting Actress in a Comedy Series	Sherilyn Reyes	Nominated	
2006	20th PMPC Star Awards for Television	Best Comedy Show	Bahay Mo Ba 'To?	Won	
2007	21st PMPC Star Awards for Television	Best Comedy Actor	Keempee de Leon	Nominated	
2007	21st PMPC Star Awards for Television	Best Comedy Actress	Tiya Pusit	Won	
2007	21st PMPC Star Awards for Television	Best Comedy Show	Bahay Mo Ba 'To?	Won	
