= Home Along Da Riles 2 =

1997 Philippine comedy film

Home Along da Riles 2
- Theatrical release poster
- Directed by: Efren 'Loging' Jarlego
- Screenplay by: Roy Vera Cruz; Loida Viriña
- Produced by: Charo Santos-Concio
- Starring: Dolphy; Nova Villa; Babalu; Claudine Barretto; Vandolph; Gio Alvarez; Smokey Manaloto; Subas Herrero
- Music by: Mon Del Rosario
- Production company: Star Cinema
- Release date: May 28, 1997
- Country: Philippines
- Language: Filipino

Home Along Da Riles 2 is a 1997 Philippine comedy film directed by Efren "Login" Jarlego and produced by Star Cinema. It is a sequel to the 1993 film Home Along Da Riles Da Movie based on the ABS-CBN television sitcom Home Along Da Riles, starring Dolphy as Kevin Cosme, a widower and a father of five who is now financially capable of renovating his home near the tracks when a life-changing inheritance from his late uncle came, allowing the Cosme family to live large in their newly acquired estate. Released on 28 May 1997, the film was written by Roy Vera Cruz and Loida Viriña. A third sequel is set to premiere on 17 June 2026 entitled Home Along Da Riles Da Reunion, bringing together most of the original cast, except for Dolphy who died in 2012.

== Plot ==
The film takes place during the events of the 1997 season of the television sitcom.

Life has returned to normal for the Cosme family. Through the generosity of Hillary Lagdameo, Kevin's boss at the Lagdameo Placement Agency, the Cosmes' humble home along the railroad tracks has been renovated. At the same time, Bob and his wife Lorie, who is now three months pregnant with their child, have just finished building their own tiny house with financial help from Bob's wealthy and domineering mother-in-law, Bridge Gales.

Kevin continues working at the Lagdameo Placement Agency, where he regularly deals with the strict and ill-tempered Steve Carpio as well as the agency's secretaries. Despite the hardships, Kevin remains determined to provide for his family.

One evening, Bob asks his greedy uncle Ritchie if he can borrow his pedicab to earn extra income for his growing family. Later that evening, Kevin arrives home just as a mailman delivers a letter addressed to him. The letter comes from the servant of Don Narciso Cosme, Kevin's estranged wealthy uncle and the brother of Kevin's late father, with whom the family had lost contact many years earlier.

The letter reveals that Don Narciso is gravely ill and wishes to see Kevin one last time before he dies. More surprisingly, it states that Kevin will inherit all of Don Narciso's lands and wealth upon his death. The unexpected news shocks and excites the entire Cosme family, who immediately begin celebrating. Their excitement is interrupted when Bridge arrives, resulting in yet another exchange of insults between her and Azon.

The following day, Ritchie lends Bob his pedicab under their unfair agreement. Meanwhile, Kevin once again asks Hillary for financial assistance, this time to help him purchase a car for the family's journey to the distant province where Don Narciso lives. Hillary kindly lends him the money despite Steve's insults and objections.

News of Kevin's expected inheritance quickly spreads throughout the neighborhood. Mang Tomas and the other residents excitedly congratulate him while asking for a blowout. Believing that Kevin will soon become wealthy and leave the railroad community forever, Mang Tomas reminds Kevin about all of his unpaid debts at his sari-sari store. Kevin cheerfully promises that he will settle everything after claiming his inheritance. Returning home, Kevin happily announces that everyone should prepare for their trip to the province.

That afternoon, the Cosme family begins their long journey aboard Kevin's newly purchased but uniquely designed car. Along the way, they notice the destruction of forests and other damaged natural resources, leaving them saddened.

Upon arriving at Don Narciso's estate, the family is amazed by the mansion and learns that Don Narciso also owns the surrounding lands, including an entire village. The family becomes excited at the thought that all of it will soon belong to Kevin. However, Kevin reminds them that they should not celebrate another person's death. He explains that the inheritance is not what matters to him, what he truly wants is to reunite with his uncle before it is too late. They are welcomed by Don Narciso's exhausted servants, Tisoy and Esperanza, who express their desire to finally leave after years of service. Kevin finally reunites with his dying uncle, who apologizes for the misunderstanding and long-standing conflict between himself and Kevin's father. He regrets that they never reconciled before Kevin's father passed away. Don Narciso happily meets Kevin's family, but shortly afterward, he peacefully dies, leaving Kevin as the presumed heir to his estate.

Meanwhile, wealthy industrialist Don Primo, a close friend of Don Narciso, discusses their problem with his son Sergio. Don Primo owns a large factory built along the coastal portion of Don Narciso's estate. The factory has long been polluting the sea, destroying the livelihood of the local fishermen and causing growing anger among the villagers. Don Primo's solution is to purchase the portion of Don Narciso's estate occupied by the village so he can demolish it, drive away its residents, and freely expand his factory. However, Don Narciso had always rejected his offers. Although many villagers oppose him, several of the younger residents support Don Primo because he provides employment. Upon learning of Don Narciso's death, Don Primo becomes frustrated but soon discovers that Kevin has inherited the estate. Determined to continue his plan, he decides to negotiate with Kevin instead. His daughter, Thalia, strongly disagrees with her father's intentions, but no one listens to her.

During Don Narciso's wake, villagers from across the estate arrive to pay their respects and remember the kindness of the late landowner. Kevin mourns deeply, saddened that he had only just reunited with his uncle before losing him again. During the wake, Kevin meets Mang Tukmol, the respected village elder who opposes Don Primo's plans, and Manny, the village youth leader who supports Don Primo because of the jobs provided by the factory.

Not long afterward, Don Primo, Sergio, and several of their henchmen arrive at the wake pretending to offer their condolences. There, Don Primo formally introduces himself to Kevin.

The following day, Kevin, Azon, and the Cosme family tour the estate together with Mang Tukmol and Manny. They learned the severe pollution caused by Don Primo's factory, which has contaminated the sea and greatly affected the fishermen's livelihood. During the visit, a hot-headed young villager named Gabriel mistakenly believes Kevin intends to evict the villagers and briefly confronts him. Upon seeing Bing, Gabriel immediately develops feelings for her. Mang Tukmol later asks Kevin to use his authority as Don Narciso's heir to shut down the factory, explaining that it was illegally built on Don Narciso's land.

Elsewhere, Bob, Lorie, and Bill explore the nearby forest. While trying to pick mangoes, Bill accidentally strikes a beehive, causing a swarm of bees to chase them. While running, Bill encounters Thalia, whose horse is giving her trouble. Bill helps her, and instantly falls in love with her.

Soon afterward, Mang Tukmol organizes a traditional circumcision ceremony for the village boys, including Baldo and Estong where Kevin also circumcised Ritchie by himself after discovering that he had never undergone the tradition.

That evening, Bing receives two unexpected suitors. A young villager named Boyong serenades her beneath the mansion and asks permission to court her. Moments later, Gabriel also arrives to confess his feelings for Bing. The two young men argue and eventually fight, prompting an angry Kevin to chase both of them away from the mansion. Meanwhile, Don Primo secretly orders another massive release of toxic chemicals from his factory directly into the sea, worsening the pollution.

The next day, the village celebrates its annual fiesta. The Cosme family performs as a band for the celebration while the villagers enjoy games, competitions, and festivities. Kevin also invites Hillary, Steve, and the secretaries, who travel to the province to join the celebration. During the festivities, Manny openly admits that he also genuinely loves Bing.

Later that day, Don Primo returns to the mansion accompanied by Sergio and his lawyer, Atty. Kamat Ayan, to formally negotiate with Kevin. He once again offers to purchase the portion of the estate occupied by the village. Kevin respectfully declines, explaining that the inheritance has not yet been legally transferred to him and, even if it were, he would never agree to sell the land after witnessing the damage caused by the factory.

Growing desperate, Don Primo secretly bribes Ritchie with a large amount of money and convinces him to persuade Kevin to accept the offer. At the same time, Bill and Thalia continue growing closer. Soon afterward, another discharge of toxic chemicals contaminates the sea. Several village children, including Gabriel's younger brother, become seriously ill after swimming in the polluted waters. Outraged, the villagers organize a protest outside Don Primo's mansion. Thalia desperately pleads with her father to listen to them, but he refuses. Instead, Don Primo orders his henchmen to point their shotguns at the villagers, forcing the terrified villagers to leave.

Back at Don Narciso's mansion, the Cosmes begin experiencing strange and frightening incidents. Unknown to them, these events are secretly staged by Ritchie in an attempt to frighten Kevin into selling the estate to Don Primo.

The following day, Don Primo returns to the mansion even more furious than before. He aggressively pressures Kevin to sell the estate, but Kevin firmly refuses once again. Before leaving, Don Primo angrily warns that the Cosmes will regret rejecting his offer.

That evening during dinner, Baldo and Estong argue. Baldo cruelly reminds Estong that he is only Kevin's adopted son and does not truly belong to the family. Kevin immediately intervenes, teaching both boys that family is defined by love rather than blood. The two reconcile and restore their brotherhood.

Wanting to spend time together again, Baldo and Estong go to the coast to catch crabs. There, they accidentally witness Don Primo's henchmen dumping another batch of toxic chemicals into the sea. Before they can escape, the boys are discovered and captured. At the same time, Ritchie confronts Don Primo and demands another money for convincing Kevin. Furious over Ritchie's repeated failures, Don Primo refuses to pay him and instead orders his henchmen to beat him up before throwing him out.

Thalia secretly witnesses everything. Horrified by her father's cruelty, she rushes to Don Narciso's mansion and informs Kevin that Baldo and Estong have been kidnapped and are being held inside the factory. Realizing that enough is enough, Kevin leads his family to the factory to rescue his sons. There, Baldo and Estong are about to be thrown into the polluted sea by Don Primo's men. A massive fight erupts between the Cosmes and the henchmen. Soon, Mang Tukmol and the villagers arrive to help, leading to a fight to defend their village and defeat Don Primo.

Together, the Cosmes and the villagers defeat Don Primo's henchmen. Cornered, Don Primo blames Thalia for betraying him. She bravely tells her father that she can no longer watch innocent people suffer because of his greed. Her words finally make Don Primo realize the consequences of his actions. He apologizes to Kevin and to the villagers, promising to surrender himself. Moments later, the police arrive and arrest Don Primo, Sergio, and the remaining henchmen.

With the conflict finally over, the polluting factory is shut down, restoring hope to the village. Despite everything, Kevin still wonders whether he truly is Don Narciso's legal heir, as no official documents or last will had ever been presented. Just then, Tisoy unexpectedly returns carrying Don Narciso's last will and testament, explaining that Don Narciso had entrusted it to him before his death but that he had forgotten to hand it over to Kevin.

Everyone gathers inside the mansion as the will is finally read. To everyone's surprise, Don Narciso had left ownership of the village and its surrounding lands to the villagers themselves. The coastal areas are officially given to the fishermen, ensuring their livelihood, while the mansion is revealed to have been mortgaged to the government and was never redeemed before Don Narciso's death. The only property left to Kevin is the small cemetery, something he has no desire to claim.

Although disappointed that he inherited nothing, Kevin gladly hands the legal documents to the villagers, finally giving them permanent ownership of their homes and land. Filled with gratitude, the entire village gathers outside the mansion to thank the Cosme family for fighting alongside them. Bill sadly says goodbye to Thalia after discovering that she already has a boyfriend, while Bing bids farewell to Gabriel before the Cosmes begin their journey home. As tokens of gratitude, the villagers send them off with baskets filled with fruits, vegetables, and other produce.

The Cosme family returns to their home along the railroad tracks, disappointed by the loss of the inheritance but grateful that they were able to help the village and restore peace. Mang Tomas and the neighborhood warmly welcome them back. Moments later, disaster unexpectedly strikes when a passing train derails and crashes into the Cosmes' newly renovated house, destroying it once again and leaving everyone in complete shock.

== Cast ==
- Dolphy as Kevin Cosme
- Nova Villa as Azon Madamba
- Smokey Manaloto as Bill
- Gio Alvarez as Bob
- Aurora Halili as Lorie
- Claudine Barretto as Bing
- Vandolph as Baldo
- Boy 2 Quizon as Estong
- Maybelyn dela Cruz as Maybelyn
- Babalu as Ritchie
- Subas Herrero as Don Primo
- Rico Yan as Gabriel
- Dominic Ochoa as Manny
- Trisha Salvador as Thalia
- Freddie Quizon as Sergio
- Palito as Don Narciso Cosme
- Don Pepot as Mang Tokmol
- Cita Astals as Hillary Lagdameo
- Bernardo Bernardo as Steve Carpio
- Ces Quesada as Bridge Gales
- Dang Cruz as Roxanne
- Tommy Angeles as Mang Tomas
- Nonong de Andres as Atty. Kamat Ayan
- Ben Tisoy as Mang Tisoy
- Mari Bar Vi Cui as Aling Esperanza
- Joymee Lim as Linggit
- Sherilyn Reyes as Sheryl
- Ericka Fife as Nonie
- April Boy Regino as Boyong

== Production ==
Unlike the first film adaptation, which was directed by Johnny Manahan, Home Along da Riles 2 was directed by Efren Jarlego. The film was produced by Star Cinema during the peak popularity of the Home Along Da Riles television series on ABS-CBN.

The production retained much of the sitcom's principal cast, including Dolphy, Nova Villa, Claudine Barretto, Smokey Manaloto, Vandolph, and Gio Alvarez. The sequel also featured actor Rico Yan, who was then emerging as one of ABS-CBN's young film and television stars.

The film expanded the sitcom's scale by moving the story outside the familiar railroad community setting and introducing estate and environmental-conflict storylines. Production design emphasized the contrast between the Cosme family's former working-class neighborhood and their temporary affluent lifestyle.

== Release ==
Home Along da Riles 2 was released in Philippine cinemas on May 28, 1997. The film was distributed by Star Cinema.

In later years, the movie became available through television reruns and digital streaming platforms associated with ABS-CBN. In 2025, Star Cinema uploaded the full film on its official YouTube channel as part of its catalog of restored and archived Filipino films.

| Preceded by Home Along Da Riles Da Movie | Home Along Da Riles Da Movie first movie | Succeeded by Home Along Da Riles Da Reunion |
