= Home Along Da Riles Da Movie =

1993 Philippine comedy film

- Theatrical poster
- Directed by: Johnny Manahan
- Screenplay by: Loida Viriña; Divino Reyes; Jose Bartolome; Herman Salvador
- Story by: Roy Vera Cruz
- Produced by: Charo Santos-Concio; Lily Monteverde; Rodolfo Vera Quizon
- Starring: Dolphy; Nova Villa; Babalu; Claudine Barretto; Vandolph; Gio Alvarez; Smokey Manaloto; Eddie Gutierrez
- Cinematography: Joe Tutanes
- Edited by: Efren Jarlego
- Music by: Homer Flores
- Production companies: Star Cinema; RVQ Productions
- Release date: August 26, 1993
- Running time: 130 minutes
- Country: Philippines
- Language: Filipino

Home Along Da Riles Da Movie is a 1993 Philippine comedy film directed by Johnny Manahan and produced by Star Cinema and RVQ Productions. The film is based on the ABS-CBN television sitcom Home Along Da Riles, starring Dolphy as Kevin Cosme, the patriarch of a working-class family living near railroad tracks. Released on August 26, 1993, the film expanded the sitcom’s storyline into a feature-length production and combined family comedy with action and crime elements. The movie was followed by a sequel, Home Along da Riles 2, in 1997. A third film entitled Home Along Da Riles Da Reunion is set to premiere in June 2026.

== Plot ==
The film takes place before and concurrently with the events of the television sitcom.

Mang Kevin Cosme is a cheerful man and the widowed patriarch of the Cosme family, who lives beside the railroad tracks with his children. He works as a chef of a 5-star hotel. One morning, Kevin excitedly prepares to receive his Best Chef of the Year Award. However, during the ceremony, a disastrous kitchen accident occurs when an LPG tank explodes. Blamed for the incident, Kevin is fired from his job and returns home heartbroken. His children are saddened by the news, while Azon, Kevin's long-time love interest and his children's aunt who has always cared for them, scolds him for losing another job.

Over the next few days, Kevin spends his time searching for work. He tries different jobs, including a security guard, a carpenter, and even an actor, but each attempt ends in failure, leaving him unable to find a stable job.

Meanwhile, Governor Quiogue, the corrupt governor of their city who secretly runs several illegal operations, learns that one of his henchmen has betrayed him. The informer is Torres, a henchman who has gathered incriminating evidence against the governor and wants to leave the organization, although he hesitates out of fear of Quiogue.

Kevin later visits the Lagdameo Placement Agency to apply for work but is rudely insulted and rejected by Steve Carpio, an employee of the agency. As he leaves the office, Kevin witnesses a lady being robbed outside the building. He rescues her from the holdaper, and she is later revealed to be Hillary Lagdameo, the owner of the placement agency. Grateful for Kevin's bravery, Hillary hires him as one of the agency's messengers.

Kevin Cosme happily announces the good news to his children, and the family celebrates his new job. Azon admits that she is proud of Kevin, joking that he is finally not lazy anymore, but her teasing quickly turns into another exchange of insults, leading to another quarrel. The following day, Kevin has a disturbing dream of a house burning down, leaving him worried and anxious. That morning, he and Azon reconcile.

At the same time, Kevin's youngest son Baldo, together with his new dog Plato, wanders around and witnesses Torres being chased by Governor Quiogue's men while carrying a videotape containing evidence of the governor's illegal activities. Before he is caught, Torres secretly hides the tape inside Baldo's pouch bag. Moments later, Torres is killed by Governor Quiogue in front of Baldo, who becomes the only witness. Realizing that a kid witnessed the killing, Quiogue orders his men to find the kid immediately.

That night, Baldo returns home frightened and repeatedly tries to tell Kevin what happened. However, Kevin is too busy preparing to work as a waiter at the Lagdameo Placement Agency's grand anniversary party, where politicians, businessmen, and Governor Quiogue himself are in attendance. Before leaving, Baldo accidentally leaves his pouch bag at Mang Tomas' sari-sari store, where it is stolen by Boy Riles, a well-known thief and neighbor of the Cosme family. Claiming the bag belongs to him, Boy Riles leaves for Bulacan after Azon's order.

During the party, Kevin struggles with demanding guests and eventually encounters Governor Quiogue. Although Kevin does not drink alcohol, he is forced by the guests to drink until he becomes drunk.

Kevin returns home late that night, exhausted and drunk. Baldo again tries to explain what he witnessed, but nobody believes him. Moments later, Governor Quiogue's henchmen suddenly raid the Cosme residence after tracking down Baldo. Believing the family possesses the incriminating videotape, they search the house, seize every videotape they can find, and leave the family terrified. After examining the tapes, the henchmen discover that none of them is the one they are looking for.

The following day, the Cosme family believes the danger is over. However, Governor Quiogue's men return, abduct Kevin, and warn Azon and the children not to report the incident to the authorities or Kevin will be killed.

Kevin is brought to an abandoned warehouse, where he is interrogated about the missing videotape. He insists that he knows nothing about it. Governor Quiogue personally offers Kevin money, protection, and anything he wants in exchange for recovering the tape. He gives Kevin one day to find it and threatens to kill his entire family if he fails. Kevin is released under the condition that he does not report to the police.

Terrified but determined to save his family, Kevin immediately breaks the agreement and seeks help from Sgt. Babalu at the police station. However, none of the police officers take him seriously, and Sgt. Babalu even attempts to imprison him instead. Upon learning that Kevin has gone to the police, Governor Quiogue begins planning his next move.

Later, Bing is nearly kidnapped by Quiogue's henchmen while walking home from school but is rescued by a mysterious woman named Jazz. Introducing herself as an undercover CIS agent, Jazz reveals that the authorities have long been investigating Governor Quiogue's criminal activities and the missing videotape. After interviewing Baldo, she and Kevin realize that the tape had been hidden inside Baldo's pouch bag, which had been left at Mang Tomas' store. They soon discover that Boy Riles took the bag and has already traveled to Azon's childhood home in Bulacan.

Kevin, his children, Azon, and Jazz travel to Bulacan to retrieve the pouch bag. Upon arriving at Azon's childhood home, they learn that Boy Riles has gone to the market to buy firecrackers for Azon's upcoming birthday celebration.

While waiting for Boy Riles to return, Kevin begins to develop feelings for Jazz, making Azon jealous. At the same time, Azon becomes increasingly suspicious of Jazz's behavior and tries to warn Kevin, but he refuses to listen.

When Boy Riles finally arrives, Kevin retrieves Baldo's pouch bag and successfully recovers the missing videotape, much to everyone's relief. Jazz volunteers to deliver the tape to the authorities by herself, claiming it will be safer that way. Kevin is willing to trust her, but Azon remains suspicious. Without anyone noticing, Azon secretly switches the videotape with an ordinary music cassette before handing it to Jazz.

That night, Jazz secretly leaves the house and meets Governor Quiogue, revealing that she is actually one of his henchmen and that her identity as an undercover agent was a deception. Furious, Quiogue discovers that Jazz recovered the wrong tape, he realizes that the Cosme family still possesses the real evidence. Realizing Azon's suspicions were correct, the Cosme family knows the governor will soon come after them again. Kevin suggests that Azon and the children escape with the tape while he stays behind to face the governor alone, but they refuse, insisting that they will stay together as one family.

Governor Quiogue and his henchmen soon surround the house, only to discover that the Cosme family has prepared several homemade traps. Although the traps slow the attackers down, the henchmen eventually overpower them, forcing the family to retreat and hide into Azon's old family barn.

Determined to kill them once and for all, Governor Quiogue orders the barn to be set on fire with the Cosme family trapped inside. As the flames spread, Kevin realizes that the burning barn is the very same scene he saw in his dream. Believing the family has died, Quiogue and his men leave, convinced that their secret is buried forever.

Fortunately, the Cosme family manages to escape before the barn completely collapses. They successfully deliver the videotape to the proper authorities and safely return home.

With the tape surrendered, Governor Quiogue's crimes and illegal activities are exposed, leading to his arrest along with all of his henchmen. Kevin is hailed as a hero for his courage and determination, earning recognition for helping bring the corrupt governor to justice.

With peace finally restored, Kevin and his family celebrate as life returns to normal. Back at their home along the railroad tracks, Kevin notices a loose wood sticking out from the house. Curious, he pulls it out, only to discover that it is the main support holding the entire house together. The house instantly collapses, leaving the Cosme family speechless.

== Cast ==
- Dolphy as Kevin Cosme
- Nova Villa as Azon Madamba
- Smokey Manaloto as Bill
- Gio Alvarez as Bob
- Claudine Barretto as Bing
- Vandolph as Baldo
- Maybelyn dela Cruz as Maybelyn
- Eddie Gutierrez as Governor Quiogue
- Cita Astals as Hillary Lagdameo
- Bernardo Bernardo as Steve Carpio
- Freddie Quizon as Freddie
- Jeanette Fernando as Jazz
- Tommy Angeles as Mang Tomas
- Dang Cruz as Roxanne
- Boyong Baytion as Boy Riles
- Babalu as Sgt. Babalu Dizon

== Production ==
The film was directed by Johnny Manahan, who also directed the television sitcom on which the movie was based. The screenplay was written by Loida Viriña, Divino Reyes, Jose Bartolome, and Herman Salvador, from a story by Roy Vera Cruz.

Production was handled by Star Cinema in cooperation with RVQ Productions, the production company associated with Dolphy. Charo Santos-Concio, Lily Monteverde, Dolphy, Rene Pascual, and Malou N. Santos served as executive producers.

The film retained most of the principal cast members from the television series, helping preserve continuity between the sitcom and the movie adaptation. Cinematography was handled by Joe Tutanes, while Efren Jarlego edited the film. Homer Flores composed the musical score.

Preceded by -	Home Along Da Riles Da Movie	Succeeded by Home Along Da Riles 2
