= Home Along Da Riles Da Reunion =

2026 Philippine comedy film

- Theatrical release poster
- Directed by: Boy2 Quizon
- Written by: Rhandy Reyes; Flo Reyes
- Produced by: Teddy Javines; Boy2 Quizon; Vandolph
- Starring: Nova Villa; Vandolph; Claudine Barretto; Gio Alvarez; Smokey Manaloto; Boy2 Quizon; Maybelyn Dela Cruz; Dang Cruz; Jenny Quizon
- Cinematography: Neil Daza
- Edited by: Renard Torres
- Music by: Vincent De Jesus
- Production companies: Riles Productions; TJAV Productions, Inc.
- Distributed by: Riles Productions
- Release date: June 17, 2026
- Running time: 100 minutes
- Country: Philippines
- Language: Filipino
- Box office: PhP 35 million

Home Along Da Riles Da Reunion is a 2026 Philippine comedy film directed by Boy2 Quizon and written by Rhandy Reyes and Flo Reyes. It is a legacy sequel to Home Along Da Riles 2 (1997) and the third film in Home Along Da Riles franchise, which continued the 1992 ABS-CBN sitcom of the same name. The film is the first entry not to feature series lead Dolphy, who portrayed Kevin Cosme, after his death in 2012.

Home Along Da Riles Da Reunion features an ensemble cast of several returning actors from the franchise, including Nova Villa, Vandolph, Claudine Barretto, Gio Alvarez, Smokey Manaloto, Boy2 Quizon, Maybelyn Dela Cruz, Dang Cruz, Cita Astals, Sherilyn Reyes-Tan, Ces Quesada, Joymee Lim, and Aurora Halili, with new additions including Jenny Quizon, Pepe Herrera, Gardo Versoza, Vito Quizon, Celyn David, Ahmad Abukawaik, and Epy Quizon. The film follows Azon (Villa) who is grieving the death of her husband Kevin (Dolphy), while her daughter Bing (Barretto) surprises the family by announcing her sudden engagement, which causes friction between the family.

The film was made and distributed independently, with permission from ABS-CBN who owned the trademarks and copyrights of the franchise. The film was released on June 17, 2026 in Philippine cinemas as a Father's Day tribute film.

== Plot ==
Years after Kevin Cosme's death, his wife Azon continues to mourn him, and begins having dreams of him when she sleeps. Bill has become a lawyer at Lagdameo Placement Agency, and is at odds with his boss Stefan while seeking to rekindle his romance with Sheryl. Bob works as a ride-share motorcycle driver to provide for his family, while still married to Lorie and at odds with Bridge, her wealthy mother. Maybe has become the local barangay captain. Baldo and Estong hustle with several side gigs, including a local eatery and bar, much to the annoyance of Baldo's wife Jenny, whom he shares two children with, Vito and Baldolito. Azon is informed of the settlers' upcoming demolition of their homes with the impending closure and renovation of the PNR Metro Commuter Line; Maybe chastises Baldo and Estong for failing to show up to the barangay hearings on the closure. Bing abruptly reveals to the family that she is engaged to a wealthy Filipino-Canadian man named Baby Boy, having secretly dated him for six years, which upsets the brothers as she had kept it a secret from the family.

Baby Boy arrives to meet the Cosme family, but the family and the townspeople are unimpressed with his looks and demeanor. The brothers attempt to hijack the relationship and drive him out, but this only distresses Bing and Azon. The brothers begin bonding with Baby Boy and their relationship improves, but a drinking session sours when an intoxicated Baby Boy reveals that he and Bing plan to move to Canada following the wedding. Azon and Roxanne accidentally stumble into a raid of a "spakol" massage parlor in the days leading up to the wedding.

During the wedding, the brothers initially struggle to let go of Bing, but they ultimately decide to let her marry Baby Boy. The reception initially goes well; Azon, believing she can die now and be with Kevin now that their family has reconciled, sees a vision of Kevin which causes her to fall down a flight of stairs and injure herself. Realizing their arguing has aggravated their mother's grief, the family decides to stage a musical number in front of her home during her recovery.

The authorities, however, arrive to drive out the settlers near the PNR line, and the family scrambles to move their belongings into Azon's home before the police could destroy it. Several misunderstandings lead to the siblings arguing once again, and the distressed Azon walks away, with Maybe unable to find her. Bill leads the siblings to the local church, where they find Azon, who tells them to be still and feel Kevin's presence. The family sees a vision of Kevin, who shares how much he loves the family, making the Cosmes decide to reconcile for good. The family later returns to the wreckage of their home, where they salvage old pictures, letters, and memories that they shared with Kevin and with one another.

A post-credits scene shows the door of Ritchie's home opening by itself.

== Cast ==
- Nova Villa as Corazon "Azon" Madamba-Cosme
- Vandolph as Baldomero "Baldo" Cosme
- Claudine Barretto as Rebecca "Bing" Cosme
- Gio Alvarez as Roberto "Bob" Cosme
- Smokey Manaloto as Billiones "Bill" Cosme
- Boy2 Quizon as Estong Cosme
- Maybelyn Dela Cruz as Maybelyn "Maybe" Madamba
- Dang Cruz as Roxanne
- Jenny Quizon as Jenny Cosme
- Pepe Herrera as Baby Boy
- Gardo Versoza as Boss Stefan
- Cita Astals as Hillary Lagdameo
- Sherilyn Reyes-Tan as Sheryl
- Ces Quesada as Brigida "Bridge" Gales
- Joymee Lim as Linggit
- Aurora Halili as Lorendina "Lorie" Gales-Cosme
- Angeli Gonzales as Asuncion Brigida Kevina "ABK" Cosme
- Vito Quizon as Vito Cosme
- Celyn David as Libag
- Ahmad Abukawaik as Baldolito Cosme
- John Amos Tan as Moymoy
- Small Laude as herself
- Mark Anthony Fernandez

Dolphy's son Epy Quizon makes a special cameo appearance as Kevin Cosme, with Dolphy's face superimposed to his with visual effects. Presley Cruz also reprises his role as one of the Sunog Baga (Burnt Lungs) boys.

== Production ==
According to Vandolph, discussions for a reunion film began when former cast members reunited at the baptism of Smokey Manaloto’s child. He recalled that an earlier viral video featuring himself and Boy2 Quizon on a train helped reignite public interest, eventually leading the Cosme family cast members to pursue the project as a tribute to Dolphy.

The concept for Home Along Da Riles Da Reunion originated from a series of informal cast reunions and viral social media videos rather than a planned studio revival. According to Boy2 Quizon and Vandolph, the idea began when they filmed a promotional video near the railroad tracks in Sucat, which gained significant online attention and led to further reunion gatherings involving former cast members. The project later evolved through the creation of the Facebook page Home Along Da Reels, where fan responses encouraged the cast to pursue a continuation of the original sitcom, with the film ultimately developed as a tribute to Dolphy and the legacy of the series rather than a remake.

On 23 December 2024, Claudine Barretto shared on her Instagram page a clip which shows a diorama of the sitcom’s set while its theme song plays in the background, with the caption: “The Cosmes are back! See you in 2025!”

On 1 May 2026, Boy2 Quizon and Vandolph announced that they have just finished the movie with most of the original cast entitled Home Along Da Riles Da Reunion set as father's day tribute film set on opening on 17 June 2026.

According to Vandolph, the film was originally intended to be submitted for the 2025 Metro Manila Film Festival, but after it was not included in the official lineup, the producers instead opted for a Father's Day 2026 theatrical release, which he described as a more fitting tribute to Dolphy, Kevin Cosme, and Babalu.

On 2 June 2026, Vandolph expressed gratitude to ABS-CBN for approving and granting the rights for the film production. He also revealed that it took them two and a half years to complete the film, but was able to bring back together the original cast. He also credited his nephew, Boy2 Quizon, for directing the film.

On 8 June 2026, director Boy2 Quizon said that Home Along Da Riles Da Reunion was conceived as a continuation rather than a remake of the original television series. He emphasized that the project was not intended to replace the legacy of his grandfather, the late Comedy King Dolphy, stating that no one could take his place and that the story instead focuses on the remaining members of the Cosme family. Quizon added that the filmmakers chose to gradually introduce the franchise to newer audiences by expanding the narrative across generations rather than immediately reinventing it with an entirely new cast and perspective.

Dolphy's grandson Vito Quizon is set to return to acting after his stint with Goin' Bulilit and will have his big screen debut. He is Vandolph’s son with wife Jenny Salimao-Quizon, who is also part of the movie.

== Marketing ==
On 6 May 2026, the official teaser trailer of the film was released. In a poster released on 26 May 2026 shared by ABS-CBN talent agency Star Magic via social media, actor Pepe Herrera joined the cast, playing the role of Baby Boy, described as the "newest energy of da riles."

A "Grand Family Day" event was held in San Juan City on 8 June 2026.

On 9 June 2026, the full trailer was released. Smokey Manaloto, who plays the Cosmes’ firstborn son, shared the official trailer of the movie on Facebook.

On its opening day, 17 June 2026, Boy 2 Quizon, Gio Alvarez, Smokey Manaloto, Vandolph, Nova Villa and other cast members visited the noontime program It's Showtime, to share more about the movie.

== Release ==
=== Advance screening ===
The cast of the upcoming reunion film Home Along da Riles Da Reunion, led by Vandolph alongside Claudine Barretto, Boy2 Quizon, Gio Alvarez, Maybeline dela Cruz, Dang Cruz, Jenny Salimao-Quizon, Cita Astals, and Nova Villa, attended an advanced screening held at the Metropolitan Theater in Manila on 2 June 2026. The advance screening was sponsored by the Manila city government as a tribute to comedian Dolphy, who originated the role of Kevin Cosme and died in 2012. Dolphy was born and raised in Tondo, Manila.

The event celebrated the legacy of the long-running sitcom Home Along Da Riles and its cultural significance to 1990s Filipino audiences. During the screening, Vandolph discussed the film’s two-and-a-half-year production process and described the reunion movie as an effort to revive the themes of family unity and values associated with the original television series.

=== Premiere night ===
The film's premiere night was held on 15 June 2026 at SM Megamall. The premiere was attended by the cast and crew, and they were joined by celebrities including actress Alma Moreno, director Eric Quizon, and former actress Pamela Ponti. The show's supporting cast and the Sunog Baga boys were also present.

== Reception ==
=== Box Office ===
On its June 17 opening day, the film earned 2.9 million pesos at the box office from 180 cinemas. On 22 June 2026, the film's official Facebook page announced that it achieved 35 million pesos on ticket sales during its 5-day run.

=== Critical response ===
The film generally received positive response from critics.

Goldwin Reviews gave a 4 out of 5 stars rating, describing the film as emotionally effective despite its noticeable narrative and scripting flaws. He also noted the film's weak story structure, unresolved conflicts, uneven pacing, and underdeveloped themes, but praised the production design, ensemble performances, and nostalgic appeal of the Cosme family. Overall, he considered the film a heartfelt and emotionally rewarding reunion movie that succeeds in capturing the warmth of Filipino family life, concluding that its strong sense of nostalgia and sincerity outweigh its shortcomings.

When in Manila praised the film for capturing the warmth, humor, and strong familial bonds that made the original sitcom beloved across generations, noting that the Cosme family’s “big, chaotic, and full of love” dynamic felt relatable even to younger viewers unfamiliar with the series. Although the film relies heavily on nostalgia and serves as a tribute to the late Dolphy and hardworking Filipino fathers, Gen Z audiences who “haven’t watched a single episode of the sitcom” could still appreciate its heartfelt humor, emotional moments, and distinctly Filipino portrayal of family life, the review said.

Daily Feed Planet described the movie as a heartfelt continuation of the beloved Filipino sitcom, praising Boy2 Quizon’s direction for balancing nostalgia, humor, and emotional sincerity while honoring Dolphy’s legacy. It also highlighted Nova Villa’s performance as the emotional center of the film and noted that the story’s focus on family unity, community struggles, and the Cosme siblings’ relationships “reminds viewers why the Cosme family became so memorable in the first place,” making the film a fitting Father’s Day tribute for longtime fans and new audiences alike.

Pelikula Mania gave a 3 out of 5 stars, praising the film for capturing “the essence of its source material” by exploring how the Cosme family and their community cope with the absence of Kevin Cosme, while also serving as a heartfelt tribute to the late Dolphy. Although the review noted that some overly chaotic scenes and attempts to adapt 1990s sitcom humor to modern cinema occasionally weakened the film, it concluded that the reunion succeeds because “it never forgets where its heart is,” emphasizing family, nostalgia, and the enduring chemistry of the cast.

LionHeartTV described the film as an emotional and nostalgic return for the Cosme family, highlighting how the reunion honors the legacy of the original sitcom and the enduring bond among its cast members.

Preceded by Home Along Da Riles 2	Home Along Da Riles Da Movie first movie	Succeeded by -
