= Katabi Ko'y Mamaw =

1991 Philippine comedy horror film

- Directed by: Mike Relon Makiling
- Screenplay by: Mike Relon Makiling
- Story by: Rolanzo Arceo
- Produced by: Adelaida Arceo; Rolanzo Arceo
- Starring: Reycard Duet; Donita Rose
- Cinematography: Ben Lobo
- Edited by: Rudy Tabotabo
- Music by: Boy Alcaide
- Production company: Airoh Media Services
- Distributed by: Airoh Media Services
- Release date: March 21, 1991
- Running time: 105 minutes
- Country: Philippines
- Language: Filipino

Katabi Ko'y Mamaw is a 1991 Philippine comedy horror film directed by Mike Relon Makiling. The film stars the Reycard Duet, along with Donita Rose as the titular ghost. Named after the duo's hit song from the 1970s, this marks their first film in 15 years.

== Plot ==
After getting robbed in Manila, Michael and Jordan go back to the province and stay in a haunted house where they meet the ghost of a young woman. The ghost is seeking justice after being murdered by asking the help of the two buddies.

== Cast ==
- Rey Ramirez as Michael
- Carding Castro as Jordan
- Berting Labra as Rollie
- Lucita Soriano as Aida
- Lyn D'Amour as Taxi Driver
- Tanya Gomez as Holdupper
- Maita Sanchez as Holdupper
- Rudy Meyer as Sgt. Lolomboy
- Dencio Padilla as Desk Officer
- Don Pepot as Security Guard
- Alex Pareja as Police Artist
- Jeffrey Santos as Tony
- German Moreno as Luigi
- Lou Veloso as Restaurant Manager
- Apple Pie Bautista as Girlie
- Larry Silva as Restaurant Customer
- Jon Achaval as Manolo
- Moody Diaz as Matilda
- Manny Castañeda as Manny
- Khryss Adalia as Chris
- Jovit Moya as Brando
- Chinkee Tan as Hammer
- Paeng Giant as Paeng
- Yoyoy Villame as Brgy. Official
- Beverly Salviejo as Debbie
- Ana Roces as Celia
- Bert Mansueto as Berto
- Josie Tagle as Josie
- Evelyn Vargas as Eva
- Alvaro Arceo as Boying
- Donita Rose as Rossana
- Nanding Fernandez as Engracio
- Gloria Romero as Lucinda
- Romy Diaz as Blacky
