= Cachupoy =

Filipino actor and comedian (1932–1993)

- Born: Salvador Garcia Tampac; July 11, 1932; Sampaloc, Manila, Philippines
- Died: December 8, 1993 (aged 61); Manila, Philippines
- Occupations: Actor, comedian
- Years active: 1966–1991

Salvador Garcia Tampac (July 11, 1932 – December 8, 1993), better known by his screen name Cachupoy, was a Filipino actor-comedian. He was a mainstay of the Magandang Tanghali television program.

== Early life ==
Cachupoy was born on July 12, 1932, in Sampaloc, Manila. He was the third child of Segundina Garcia and Meliton Tampac. He graduated from Juan Luna Elementary School, Roxas High School and reached the second year of Fine Arts (major in painting) at University of Santo Tomas. He dreamt of being an actor or a painter.

== Career ==
Before entering show business, he worked for a construction firm. He acted in stage shows with the moniker "Susing"; Lou Salvador Sr. gave him the name "Cachupoy". It was Director Jose Miranda Cruz that gave him the first break in the movies. His first film was Tatlong Mabilis in 1965. He also starred in Igorota and Ang Pulubi, from Nepumuceno Pictures. He also showed a flair for singing and was part of the trio The Millionaires which was also made up of Manok and Miniong Villegas. They broke up after three years of performing. He was under contract with Nepomuceno Productions and with ABS-CBN for television projects. His first television performance as a comedian was Hiwaga sa Bahay Na Bato. His shows at Channel 3 were Cuatro Vidas, Winner Take All and Eddie and Nova Plus.

Cachupoy's performance in the 1988 film 7 Pasiklab sa Army was given high praise by critic Lav Diaz for being very comedic, stating that he was better than even his comedian co-stars Don Pepot and Redford White in the film.

Cachupoy starred in films such as Sa Kabukiran, Sitak ni Jack, Rangers in the Wrong War (1987), A Man Called Tolonges (1981), and Pitong James Bonds (1966). He also starred in the "Andres de Saya" series (1980, 1983, and 1986) with Vic Vargas and Gloria Diaz and Mahiwagang Singsing (1986) with Lotlot de Leon.

Cachupoy was also known in his performances with Serafin Gabriel (a.k.a. Apeng Daldal) and with Arturo Vergara Medina (a.k.a. Bentot).

== Later life and death ==
Cachupoy was married to Marietta P. Garcia, the founder of the Mediserve Technical Career Institute in Tacloban City; it received controversy for allegedly operating without license from the Department of Education, Culture and Sports (DECS). Cachupoy's last film was Ganti ng Api in 1991, then he quit and retired from the industry. Cachupoy succumbed to a non-communicable disease on December 8, 1993, in Manila, Philippines. He was 61 years old. He was cremated, his ashes inurned at the in Manila Catholic Church Ossuary.

== Filmography ==
Year	Title	Role	Note(s)	Ref(s).
1966	Pitong James Bonds			Ref(s).
1968	Alyas 1-2-3			
1968	Manila, Open City			
1977	Checkered Flag or Crash		Also known as simply Crash	
1980	Andres de Saya			
1982	Pretty Boy Tsaplin and the 3'Istodyes	Tsaplin		
1984	Atsay Killer: Buti Nga Sa'yo			
1985	Captain Yagit			
1986	Soldyer!	Sgt. Pagaspas		
1987	Rangers in the Wrong War			
1987	Puto	Boy George		
1988	Bobo Cop			
1988	7 Pasiklab sa Army			
1988	Jockey T'yan			
1989	Captain Yagit			
1989	Khong Khing		Bobo Films' initial offering	
1991	Ganti ng Api			
