= Guila Alvarez =

Filipino Actor

- Born: June 10, 1980 (age 46); Manila, Philippines
- Occupation: Actress
- Spouse: Ping Bautista
- Children: 4
- Relatives: Gio Alvarez (brother); Luigi Alvarez (brother)

Guila Alvarez is a former Filipino actor.

== Personal life ==
Alvarez's brothers are actors Gio Alvarez and Luigi Alvarez.

Alvarez is married to Ping Bautista, together they have four children.

== Filmography ==
=== Television ===
Year	Title	Role	Notes	Source
1992–97	Ang TV	Herself ― various roles		
1993	Maalaala Mo Kaya		Episode: "Bote at Yantok"	
1993	Maalaala Mo Kaya		Episode: "Mga Buto at Punla"	
1994	Maalaala Mo Kaya		Episode: "Mamera"	
1995–98	'Sang linggo nAPO sila	Herself ― host		
1996	Gimik	Jill		
1996–98	Super Laff-In	Herself ― various roles		
1996	Maalaala Mo Kaya		Episode: "Mynah"	
1997	Maalaala Mo Kaya		Episode: "Bituin"	
1997	Maalaala Mo Kaya		Episode: "Liwanag"	
1999	Maalaala Mo Kaya		Episode: "Video Cam"	

=== Film ===
Year	Title	Role	Notes	Source
1990	Mundo Man ay Magunaw			
1990	Ama, Bakit Mo Ako Pinabayaan?	Young Julie		
1991	Maging Sino Ka Man	Pek		
1991	Hihintayin Kita sa Langit	Young Carmina		
1991	Darna			
1992	Eddie Tagalog: Pulis Makati			
1992	Ikaw Pa Lang ang Minahal	Young Adela		
1992	Rosang Tattoo			
1993	Kailangan Kita	Mia		
1996	Ang TV Movie: The Adarna Adventure	Bianca		
2019	Kuwaresma	Salve		

== Awards and nominations ==
Year	Work	Organization	Category	Result	Source
1990	Ama, Bakit Mo Ako Pinabayaan?	Metro Manila Film Festival	Best Child Performer (Note: Tied with Vandolph.)	Won	
1993	Ikaw Pa Lang ang Minahal	FAMAS Awards	Best Child Performer	Nominated	
