= Si Ayala at si Zobel =

1994 comedy film by Junn Cabreira

- Directed by: Junn Cabreira
- Screenplay by: Mike Tan
- Produced by: Orly Ilacad
- Starring: Anjo Yllana; Ogie Alcasid
- Cinematography: Rudy Diño
- Edited by: Segundo Ramos
- Music by: Sunny Ilacad
- Production company: OctoArts Films
- Distributed by: OctoArts Films
- Release date: October 5, 1994
- Running time: 105 minutes
- Country: Philippines
- Language: Filipino

Si Ayala at si Zobel is a 1994 Filipino comedy film directed by Junn Cabreira. The film stars Anjo Yllana and Ogie Alcasid in their respective title roles, named in reference to businessmen Jaime Zobel de Ayala and Enrique Zobel.

The film is streaming online on YouTube.

== Plot ==
Ayala (Anjo) and Zobel (Ogie) must work for Lilit's (Nova) company in order for them to inherit a fortune of $1 million. Lilit has two nieces Jenny and Janet, who are courted by rich men Carlo and Joey respectively. Soon, Ayala and Zobel will conquer the hearts of Jenny and Janet, and give Carlo and Joey a run for their money.

== Cast ==
- Anjo Yllana as Ayala
- Ogie Alcasid as Zobel
- Babalu as Soriano
- Jennifer Mendoza as Jenny
- Michael V. as Keempee
- Kier Legaspi as Carlo
- Janet Arnaiz as Jannet
- Nova Villa as Lilit Chonin
- Jaime Fabregas as bank manager
- Gary Lising as Bart
- Don Pepot as lawyer
- Jan Rivera as Chito
- Joey Palomar as Joey
