= Vandolph =

Filipino actor and comedian (born 1984)

The Honorable Vandolph L. Quizon

Member of the Parañaque City Council from the 1st district
- In office June 30, 2016 – June 30, 2025

Personal details
- Born: Vandolph Lacsamana Quizon; May 7, 1984 (age 42) Manila, Philippines
- Party: PDP–Laban (2018–present)
- Other political affiliations: Liberal (2015–2018)
- Relations: Wynwyn Marquez (half-sister); Mark Anthony Fernandez (half-brother); Freddie Quizon (half-brother); Rolly Quizon (half-brother); Eric Quizon (half-brother); Epy Quizon (half-brother); Zia Quizon (half-sister); Grae Fernandez (half-nephew)
- Parents: Dolphy (father); Alma Moreno (mother)
- Occupation: Actor; comedian
- Nicknames: Vandolph; Baldomero "Baldo" Kosme

Vandolph Lacsamana Quizon (born May 7, 1984) is a Filipino actor, comedian and politician. He has served as a councilor of Parañaque for the 1st district since 2016.

== Personal life ==
He is the only son of comedian Dolphy with actress-politician Alma Moreno.

== Television and film career ==
=== 1980s showbiz debut ===
Vandolph's first movie was Balimbing: Taong Huyango in 1986, alongside his real life father Dolphy.

=== 1990s ===
Vandolph appeared in Ang TV on ABS-CBN in 1992. He then appeared in the sitcom Home Along Da Riles, which was also on ABS-CBN. In the same year, he did a drama anthology with his father, Dolphy, on Maalaala Mo Kaya. In 1993, he appeared on GMA Telecine Specials, in GMA which he plays a hyper kid who went to America. The same year, he launched a new sitcom Tondominium, directed by Joey Marquez, Vandolph's former stepfather.

=== 2000–2005 ===
In 2000, Vandolph's first action series was Pintados on GMA with his co-stars Michael Flores, Assunta De Rossi, Angelika Dela Cruz and Sherwin Ordoñez. In 2001, he was involved in a car accident. He survived with Amnesia but his girlfriend "Ishi" died due to head injuries. In 2005, he guested in a youth oriented drama series, Maynila also on GMA, and guested on reality shows Victim Extreme on ABS-CBN and Extra Challenge on GMA. The same year, Vandolph met Jenny Salimao and they become longtime love partners.

=== 2006–2010 ===
In 2006, he launched his first gag show, Quizon Avenue on ABS-CBN. In 2008, his biggest break was the action series Palos. The same year, he returns to sitcom via John En Shirley a spin-off of John En Marsha. In 2009, Vandolph signed a contract with joining a family fantasy sitcom, Pidol's Wonderland and was a celebrity guest judge on Talentadong Pinoy also in the same year. In 2010, he returns to drama anthology, Untold Stories Mula Sa Face To Face on TV5.

=== 2011–present ===
In 2011, Vandolph appeared in the Chinese-themed television drama Babaeng Hampaslupa on and in the action-comedy film Praybeyt Benjamin where he acted alongside Vice Ganda and Jimmy Santos. In 2012 he played a supporting role in the children's fantaserye Wako Wako. Vandolph appeared in the action-comedy film The Fighting Chefs, which also starred celebrity chef Boy Logro in his feature film debut. Vandolph also made a guest appearance in the Philippine version of Minute to Win It. He also played a supporting role in the 2014 biopic ABNKKBSNPLAko?!, based on the 2001 Bob Ong autobiography of the same name.

=== Politics ===
In 2016, he ran for councilor of 1st District of Parañaque and he won. He was re-elected in 2019 and in 2022.

== Filmography ==
=== Television ===
- Ang TV (1992)
- Lovingly Yours (1992)
- Home Along Da Riles (1992–1998) - Baldomero "Baldo" Kosme
- Maalaala Mo Kaya (1993)
- GMA Telecine Specials (1993)
- Tondominium (1993)
- Purungtong (1993)
- Batibot (1994)
- Wow Mali! (1996)
- Pintados (2000)
- Magpakailanman (2002)
- Home Along Da Airport (2003–2005) - Baldomero "Baldo" Kosme
- Victim Extreme (2005)
- Maynila (2005)
- Extra Challenge (2005) - Challenger
- Quizon Avenue (2006)
- O-Ha! (2006)
- John En Shirley (2006–2007) - Atong J. Puruntong
- Sabi Ni Nanay (2007)
- Palos (2008)
- Eat Bulaga (2008) - joined and won as EB Bebot
- Talentadong Pinoy (2009)
- Pidol's Wonderland (2009)
- Untold Stories Mula Sa Face To Face (2010)
- Spooky Nights Presents (2010)
- Babaeng Hampaslupa (2011)
- Wako Wako (2012)
- Wiltime Bigtime (2012) - Guest Host
- Wansapanataym (2012)
- It's Showtime (2012) - Celebrity Judge
- Toda Max (2012) - Guest
- Be Careful With My Heart (2012–2014)
- Minute To Win It (2013) - Guest
- The Legal Wife (2014)
- Two Wives (2014)
- Wasak (2015)
- Kapamilya, Deal or No Deal (2015)
- Tunay Na Buhay (2015)
- Sabado Badoo (2015) - cameo footage
- Ningning (2015)
- Wowowin (2015)
- Dangwa (2015)
- Karelasyon (2016)
- Dear Uge (2016)
- FPJ's Batang Quiapo (Kapamilya Channel, 2023–2024)
- Para sa Isa't Isa (2025–2026)
- Rainbow Rumble (2026)

=== Film ===
Year	Title	Role	Notes
1986	Balimbing: Mga Taong Hunyango		
1987	Wanted: Bata Batuta		
1987	Bata Batuta		
1988	Enteng the Dragon	Kuto	
1990	Espadang Patpat (Stick Sword)	Zondrox	
1991	Bulag Pipi At Bingi		
1992	Pempe ni Sara at Pen		
1992	Espadang Patpat		
1993	Home Along Da Riles Da Movie	Baldomero "Baldo" Kosme	
1994	Walang Matigas Na Tinapay Sa Mainit Na Kape	Butchie	
1994	Hataw Tatay Hataw	Boyet	
1995	Boy Gising	Boy Gising	
1995	Father & Son	Bimbo	
1996	Aringkingking	Carlo	
1997	Pakners	Elmo	
1997	Home Along Da Riles 2	Baldomero "Baldo" Kosme	
1998	Tatay-Nic	Patsoy	
2002	Home Along Da Riber	Mark	
2009	Nobody, Nobody But... Juan	Young Tu	
2010	Father Jejemon	Etot	
2011	The Unkabogable Praybeyt Benjamin	Buhawi Manay	Vandolph's 1st Viva Films movie
2013	The Fighting Chefs	Comedian Chef	
2014	ABNKKBSNPLAko?! The Movie	Ulo	
2014	The Amazing Praybeyt Benjamin	Buhawi Manay	
2018	Amnesia Love	Edwin	
2021	On the Job: The Missing 8		Vandolph's 1st action drama thriller movie
2026	Home Along Da Riles Da Reunion	Baldomero "Baldo" Kosme	Also producer

== Awards and nominations ==
Year	Work	Organization	Category	Result	Source
1990	Espadang Patpat	Metro Manila Film Festival	Best Child Performer (Note: Tied with Guila Alvarez.)	Won	
