= Jomari Yllana =

Filipino actor

Member of the Parañaque City Council from 1st district
- In office June 30, 2016 – June 30, 2025

Personal details
- Born: José María Garchitorena Yllana; August 16, 1976 (age 50) Manila, Philippines
- Party: PDP (2016–present)
- Other political affiliations: PMP (2015–2016)
- Spouses: Aiko Melendez (m. 2000; ann. 2004) Abby Viduya (m. 2023)
- Parent(s): Andres Yllana Sr. (father); Vicky Garchitorena-Yllana (mother)
- Relatives: Anjo Yllana (brother); Robbie Yllana (1969–2010; brother); Paulie Yllana (brother); Ryan Yllana (brother); Mikee Villanueva (cousin); Francis Garchitorena (uncle); Mariano Garchitorena (grandfather)
- Occupation: Actor; model; concert producer and promoter; racing driver; politician
- Nickname(s): JMY, Joe Mari Garchitorena, Jo Mari Yllana, Jose Mari

José María "Jomari" Garchitorena Yllana (born August 16, 1976) is a Filipino actor, model, racing driver, concert producer, promoter, and politician.

He rose to fame as one of the members of 1990s teen group "Gwapings" together with Mark Anthony Fernandez, Eric Fructuoso, and later with Jao Mapa.

Two of his films, Diliryo (Delirium) and Sa Pusod ng Dagat (The Heart of the Sea) were presented at the 1997 and 1998 Toronto International Film Festival respectively. Diliryo was released through MAQ Productions, directed by Peque Gallaga and Lore Reyes, and starred Giselle Toengi as Yllana's leading lady. Sa Pusod ng Dagat starred Marilou Diaz-Abaya, Elizabeth Oropesa, and Chin Chin Gutierrez.

== Career ==
Yllana appeared in several TV shows for ABS-CBN and GMA networks. In 2009, Yllana starred in Zorro, and became a contestant in Celebrity Duets: Philippine Edition. Also, Yllana played Alex Dorantes in Rosalinda opposite with Carla Abellana and Geoff Eigenmann and starred in the movie Yaya and Angelina: The Spoiled Brat Movie with Michael V., Ogie Alcasid and ex-wife Aiko Melendez.

Currently, Yllana remains a freelance actor.

== Other works ==
Aside from being an actor, Yllana also was a successful commercial and promotional model for the Bench clothing line.

Currently, Yllana together with controversial politician Ronald "Ronnie" Singson, heads the Fearless Productions, a joint business venture which produces and promotes concerts in the Philippines for international and local artists.

== Politics ==
In the 2016, Yllana ran for councilor of 1st District of Parañaque and won. He was re-elected in 2019 and in 2022.

== Personal life ==
Yllana has brothers in showbiz: comedian-actors Anjo (older brother) and Ryan (younger brother). Yllana is the former husband of actress/politician Aiko Melendez, whose marriage was annulled, and they have a son named Andrei. He and Melendez remain good friends and maintain a good co-parenting relationship.

Yllana and his former live-in partner reportedly also have two sons.

Yllana's former girlfriends include Priscilla Almeda, Ara Mina and Pops Fernandez. Yllana and Almeda reunited in 2019.

On November 5, 2023, a private wedding of Yllana and Almeda was held in Little White Chapel in Las Vegas, Nevada, United States. A church wedding is set in Naga by following year.

== Filmography ==
=== Film ===
Year	Title	Role	Ref
1989	Regal Shocker The Movie: Aparador		
1991	Hihintayin Kita sa Langit	Young Gabriel	
1991	Emma Salazar Case	Leo	
1991	Shake, Rattle & Roll III: Ate	Delinquent	
1992	Mahal Kita Walang Iba	Ruben	
1992	Gwapings: The Adventure	Mike	
1993	Secret Love	Jodi	
1993	Bulag, Pipi at Bingi		
1993	Dino... Abangan Ang Susunod Na...		
1993	Gwapings Dos	Dennis	
1994	Sobra Talaga...Over		
1994	The Secrets of Sarah Jane: Sana'y Mapatawad Mo	Francis	
1995	Ikaw Lang Ang Mamahalin: Camiguin		
1995	Pare Ko	Mackie	
1995	Araw-Araw, Gabi-Gabi		
1996	Taguan	Serge	
1996	Kabilin-bilinan ng Lola		
1996	Mula Noon Hanggang Ngayon	Nico	
1997	Kahit Kailan		
1997	Diliryo		
1998	Sa Pusod ng Dagat	Pepito	
1998	Sagad sa Init		
1998	Sambahin ang Ngalan Mo	Ramoncito	
1999	Banatan		
1999	Warat: Bibigay Ka Ba?	Rex	
1999	Bulaklak ng Maynila	Ed	
2000	Mahal Kita, Walang Iwanan	Bodgie	
2000	Most Wanted		
2000	Katayan		
2001	Gatas... Sa Dibdib Ng Kaaway		
2004	Minsan Pa	Jerry	
2004	Sigaw	Bert	
2007	Enteng Kabisote 4: Okay Ka Fairy Ko...The Beginning of the Legend	José Rizal	
2009	Yaya and Angelina: The Spoiled Brat Movie	Mr. A	
2011	Ikaw ang Pag-ibig	Dr. Joey Lucas	
2012	The Healing	Robert	

=== Television ===
Year	Title	Role	Type of Role(s)
1991–1998	Palibhasa Lalake	Jomari	
1992	Maalaala Mo Kaya: Payaso		
1995–2000	ASAP	Himself / co-host / Performer	
2000	Eat Bulaga!	Himself / co-host	
2000	Kiss Muna	Third	
2001	Kool Ka Lang	Bal	
2002	Sana ay Ikaw na Nga	Paulo	
2003	Hawak Ko ang Langit	Julian	
2004	Te Amo, Maging Sino Ka Man	Rodelio	
2005	Kampanerang Kuba	Martin De Vega	
2007	Mars Ravelo's Lastikman	Mang Ninoy / Morphino	
2008	Palos	Alessandro Canavaro	
2008	Maalaala Mo Kaya: Dagat	Freddie	
2008	Philippines Scariest Challenge	Host	
2008	Lovebooks Presents	Various	
2009	Zorro	Diego Dela Vega	
2009	Celebrity Duets: Philippine Edition	Himself / Contestant	
2009	Rosalinda	Alex Dorantes	
2009	Sana Ngayong Pasko	Young Pablo	
2010	Claudine: Present Madrasta	Alejandro	
2010	Imortal	Roman Rodriguez	Supporting cast
2010	Agimat: Ang Mga Alamat ni Ramon Revilla: Kapitan Inggo	Carlos Salazar	Main cast
2012	E-Boy	Miguel Villareal	Main Cast / Anti-Hero
2013	Indio	Young Tarong	Special Participation
2013	Kakambal ni Eliana	Emmanuel "Eman" Dominguez	Main Cast / Protagonist
2013	Juan dela Cruz	Young Julian "Lolo Juls" dela Cruz	Special Participation
2014–2015	The Half Sisters	Benjamin 'Benjie' Valdicañas / Mang Tonyo and Noli de Santos	Main Cast / Protagonist

== Awards ==
Year	Award-Giving Body	Category	Work	Result
1996	Metro Manila Film Festival	Best Actor	Kakit Kailan: Love Forgives	Won
