= 7 Pasiklab sa Army =

1988 erotic war comedy film by Bill Baldridge

- Directed by: Bill Baldridge
- Written by: Bill Baldridge
- Starring: Redford White; Cachupoy; Don Pepot; Tatlong Itlog; Janice Jurado
- Production company: Arte Films
- Release date: July 6, 1988
- Country: Philippines
- Language: Filipino

7 Pasiklab sa Army (lit. '7 Boastfuls in the Army') is a 1988 Filipino erotic war comedy film written and directed by Bill Baldridge, and stars Redford White, Cachupoy, Don Pepot, the "Tatlong Itlog" (lit. 'Three Eggs'), and Janice Jurado. Set during the Vietnam War, the film is about seven Filipino army recruits who are tasked with retrieving a captured general in Vietnam and bringing him to the Philippines so that he can help find the lost gold of Yamashita. Produced by Arte Films, the film was released on July 6, 1988.

Critic Lav Diaz gave the film a mixed review, criticizing its uneven comedic quality while giving high praise to Cachupoy's hilarious performance.

== Plot ==
General Livingstone is the only person who knows where Yamashita's gold is located, and he is currently held captive in Vietnam during the Vietnam War. Seven Filipino soldiers are thus recruited by the military with the task of retrieving General Livingstone and bringing him to the Philippines to find the lost gold, which can potentially bolster the Philippine economy.

== Cast ==
- Redford White
- Cachupoy
- Don Pepot
- Tatlong Itlog
- Janice Jurado
- Joseph de Cordova
- Woodrow Serafin
- Gina Keiser
- Graziella

== Release ==
7 Pasiklab sa Army was graded "C" by the Movie and Television Review and Classification Board (MTRCB), indicating a "Fair" quality; though the board described it as "[a] naughty sex-comedy movie," it only gave the film a "P" rating, which stands for "Parental Guidance Recommended." The film was released on July 6, 1988.

=== Critical response ===
Lav Diaz, writing for the Manila Standard, gave the film a mixed review. He criticized the uneven quality of its comedy, stating that "sometimes you will laugh so hard and at other times you would be annoyed at the corniness." Diaz also criticized the film's depiction of the Vietnamese people as stupid and childish, which he thought was outdated. However, Diaz gave high praise to Cachupoy's comedic performance, which he thought had bested his co-stars' own efforts at being funny, even through just simple gestures. Diaz also expressed surprise at the film's erotic camerawork and good lighting, which he noted as being rare in Filipino comedies.
