= 2019 Parañaque local elections =

Elections for Parañaque on May 13

2019 Parañaque mayoral election
- May 13, 2019
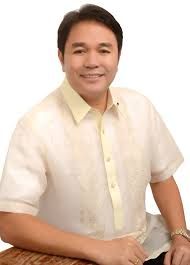
Nominee	Edwin Olivarez	Florencio "Jun" Bernabe Jr.
Party	PDP–Laban	Lakas
Running mate	Rico Golez	Jeremy Marquez
Popular vote	169,224	52,824
Percentage	75.58%	23.59%
Mayor before election
Edwin Olivarez
PDP–Laban
Elected mayor
Edwin Olivarez
PDP–Laban

Local elections were held in Parañaque on May 13, 2019, within the 2019 Philippine general election. Voters elected for the elective local posts in the city: the mayor, vice mayor, two congressmen, and the 16 councilors, eight each in the two local legislative districts of Parañaque.

== Background ==
Mayor Edwin Olivarez ran for re-election for third and final term. He was challenged by his predecessor, former Mayor Florencio "Jun" Bernabe Jr.

Vice Mayor Jose Enrico "Rico" Golez ran for re-election for third and final term. He was challenged once again by BF Homes Barangay Captain Jeremy Marquez.

First District Representative Eric Olivarez ran for re-election for third and final term. He was challenged by former Councilor Jaime "Jimmy" Delos Santos.

Second District Representative Gustavo Tambunting was eligible to run for re-election, but chose not to run. His wife, Joy Myra Tambunting ran in his place. Tambunting was challenged by Pacifico "Pacing" Rosal.

== Results ==
Names written in bold-Italic are the re-elected incumbents while in italic are incumbents lost in elections.

=== For District Representatives ===
==== First District ====
Rep. Eric Olivarez won over former Councilor Jaime Delos Santos.

Congressional Elections in the Parañaque's First District
Party	Candidate	Votes	%
**PDP–Laban**	**Eric Olivarez**	**74,692**	**84.45%**
Lakas	Jaime "Jimmy" Delos Santos	13,743	15.54%
**Total votes**		**88,435**	**100.00%**
PDP–Laban **hold**			

Popular vote percentage
**Olivarez**	84.45%
Delos Santos	15.54%

==== Second District ====
Joy Myra Tambunting won the election.

Congressional Elections in the Parañaque's Second District
Party	Candidate	Votes	%
**PDP–Laban**	**Joy Myra Tambunting**	**103,028**	**89.45%**
Independent	Pacifico "Pacing" Rosal	12,144	10.54%
**Total votes**		**115,172**	**100.00%**
PDP–Laban **hold**			

Popular vote percentage
**Tambunting**	89.45%
Rosal	10.54%

=== For Mayor ===
Mayor Edwin Olivarez defeated former Mayor Florencio "Jun" Bernabe Jr.

Parañaque Mayoralty Election
Party	Candidate	Votes	%
**PDP–Laban**	**Edwin Olivarez**	**169,224**	**75.58%**
Lakas	Florencio "Jun" Bernabe Jr.	52,824	23.59%
Independent	Maria Theresa Balgua	1,368	0.61%
Independent	Zandro Mate	478	0.21%
**Total votes**		**223,894**	**100.00%**
PDP–Laban **hold**			

Popular vote percentage
**Olivarez**	75.58%
Bernabe	23.59%
Balgua	0.61%
Mate	0.21%

=== For Vice Mayor ===
Vice Mayor Jose Enrico "Rico" Golez defeated Jeremy Marquez for the second time.

Parañaque Vice Mayoralty Election
Party	Candidate	Votes	%
**NPC**	**Jose Enrico "Rico" Golez**	**141,433**	**66.50%**
Nacionalista	Jeremy Marquez	71,229	33.49%
**Total votes**		**212,662**	**100.00%**
NPC **hold**			

Popular vote percentage
**Golez**	66.50%
Marquez	33.49%

=== For Councilors ===
Party	Votes	%	Seats
PDP-Laban	994,514	67.17	15
Lakas	292,214	19.74	–
NPC	90,818	6.13	1
PDDS	32,981	2.23	–
PFP	29,756	2.01	–
Independent	40,384	2.73	–
Ex officio seats			2
**Total**	**1,480,667**	**100.00**	**18**

Team Bagong Parañaque (PDP–Laban/NPC)

Team Bagong Parañaque 1st District
Name	Party
Daniel Eric Baes	PDP–Laban
Eleazar Diokno	PDP–Laban
Pablo Gabriel Jr.	PDP–Laban
Vandolph Quizon	PDP–Laban
Marvin Santos	PDP–Laban
Allen Nava Tan	PDP–Laban
Joan Villafuerte-Densing	PDP–Laban
Jomari Yllana	PDP–Laban

Team Bagong Parañaque 2nd District
Name	Party
Miles Antipuesto	PDP–Laban
Edwin Benzon	PDP–Laban
Jackie Bustamante-Mendoza	PDP–Laban
Tess de Asis	PDP–Laban
Juvan Esplana	PDP–Laban
Binky Favis	PDP–Laban
Wahoo Sotto	NPC
Regina Jean Yllana	PDP–Laban

Team Bernabe-Marquez (Lakas–CMD/HNP)

Team Bernabe-Marquez Parañaque-1st District
Name	Party
Rochelle Barrameda	Lakas
Ray Gumabao	Lakas
Diamante Inciong	Lakas
Joseph Lim	PFP
Mer Marohombsar	Lakas
Jayson Moral	Lakas
Jimmy Nery	PDDS
Aris Peñafuerte	PDDS

Team Bernabe-Marquez Parañaque-2nd District
Name	Party
Jaymee dela Rosa	Lakas
Ana Distor	Lakas
Alfred Lazatin	Lakas
Dominic Ochoa	Lakas
Jepoy Peolino	Lakas
Felix Resuello	Lakas
Cherry Sierra	Lakas
Anthony Vivero	Lakas

Independent politicians

Independent Parañaque-1st District
Name	Party
Razel Lagman	Independent
Vincent Ace Mangosing	Independent

Independent 2nd District
Name	Party
Gabriel Cornelio Igot	Independent

==== First District ====
City Council Elections in Parañaque's First District
Party	Candidate	Votes	%
**PDP–Laban**	**Joan Villafuerte-Densing**	**60,598**	**63.93**
**PDP–Laban**	**Vandolph Quizon**	**56,676**	**59.79**
**PDP–Laban**	**Pablo Gabriel Jr.**	**55,946**	**59.02**
**PDP–Laban**	**Allen Ford Tan**	**55,129**	**58.16**
**PDP–Laban**	**Marvin Santos**	**54,989**	**58.01**
**PDP–Laban**	**Jose Maria "Jomari" Yllana**	**48,937**	**51.63**
**PDP–Laban**	**Daniel Eric Baes**	**48,920**	**51.61**
**PDP–Laban**	**Eleazar Diokno**	**38,490**	**40.61**
Lakas	Diamante Inciong	32,704	34.50
Lakas	Rochelle Barrameda	26,490	27.95
Independent	Vincent Ace Mangosing	26,202	27.64
PDDS	Jimmy Nery	20,865	22.01
PFP	Haku Factor	17,232	18.18
Lakas	Ray Gumabao	17,164	18.11
PFP	Joseph Lim	12,524	13.21
PDDS	Aris Peñafuerte	12,116	12.78
Lakas	Jayson Moral	8,927	9.42
Lakas	Mer Marohombsar	7,839	8.27
Independent	Razel Lagman	5,624	5.93
**Total votes**		**607,372**	**100.00%**

==== Second District ====
City Council Elections in Parañaque's Second District
Party	Candidate	Votes	%
**PDP–Laban**	**Vincent Kenneth "Binky" Favis**	**91,740**	**67.11**
**NPC**	**Viktor Eriko "Wahoo" Sotto**	**90,818**	**66.44**
**PDP–Laban**	**Giovanni "Juvan" Esplana**	**86,756**	**63.47**
**PDP–Laban**	**Maritess "Tess" de Asis**	**81,713**	**59.78**
**PDP–Laban**	**Regina Yllana**	**79,818**	**58.39**
**PDP–Laban**	**Jacqueline "Jackie" Bustamante-Mendoza**	**79,360**	**58.06**
**PDP–Laban**	**Merlie "Miles" Antipuesto**	**78,347**	**57.32**
**PDP–Laban**	**Edwin "Bong" Benzon**	**77,095**	**56.40**
Lakas	Dominic Ochoa	54,323	39.74
Lakas	Jaymee dela Rosa	33,156	24.26
Lakas	Alfred Lazatin	23,438	17.15
Lakas	Felix Resuello	23,124	16.92
Lakas	Cherrie Sierra	19,706	14.42
Lakas	Anthony Vivero	15,504	11.34
Lakas	Jepoy Peolino	15,396	11.26
Lakas	Ana Distor	14,443	10.57
Independent	Gabriel Cornelio Igot	8,558	6.26
**Total votes**		**873,295**	**100.00%**
