= 2016 Parañaque local elections =

Philippine election

2016 Parañaque mayoral election
- May 9, 2016
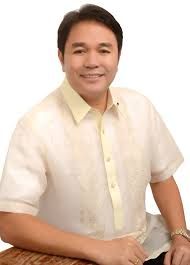
Nominee	Edwin Olivarez
Party	Liberal
Running mate	Jose Enrico "Rico" Golez
Popular vote	193,925
Percentage	100.00%
Mayor before election
Edwin Olivarez
Liberal
Elected mayor
Edwin Olivarez
Liberal

Local elections were held in Parañaque City on May 9, 2016, within the Philippine general election. The voters elected for the elective local posts in the city: the mayor, vice mayor, the congressman, and the councilors, eight of them in the two districts of the city.

== Background ==
Mayor Edwin Olivarez ran for re-election unopposed.

Vice Mayor Jose Enrico "Rico" Golez ran for re-election. He faced Jeremy Marquez, the son of former city mayor Joselito "Joey" Marquez.

First District Rep. Eric Olivarez ran for re-election against Vic Celeridad.

Second District Rep. Gustavo "Gus" Tambunting ran for re-election against former Rep. Jose Roilo Golez.

Celebrities and prominent personalities will also try to get a seat in the city council. This includes dancer Bok Inciong of Masculados, comedians Ryan Yllana and Vandolph Quizon, singer Roselle Nava, actor Jomari Yllana, basketball coach Binky Favis, and Hubert Webb, who is known to be the primary mastermind in the 1991 Vizconde massacre.

== Results ==
Names written in bold-Italic are the re-elected incumbents while in italic are incumbents lost in elections.

=== For Mayor ===
Mayor Edwin Olivarez was re-elected unopposed.

Parañaque Mayoralty Election
Party	Candidate	Votes	%
**Liberal**	**Edwin Olivarez**	**193,925**	**100.00%**
Total votes		**193,925**	**100.00%**
Liberal **hold**			

=== Vice Mayor ===
Vice Mayor Jose Enrico "Rico" Golez defeated Jeremy Marquez in a tight election.

Parañaque Vice Mayoralty Election
Party	Candidate	Votes	%
**Liberal**	**Jose Enrico “Rico” Golez**	**119,819**	**55.40%**
Nacionalista	Jeremy Marquez	94,295	43.60%
NUP	Zandro Mate	2,135	0.98
Total votes		**216,249**	**100.00%**
Liberal **hold**			

=== For Representative ===
==== First District ====
Rep. Eric Olivarez was re-elected.

Congressional Elections in Parañaque's First District
Party	Candidate	Votes	%
**Liberal**	**Eric Olivarez**	**79,760**	**97.26%**
UNA	Vic Celeridad	2,243	2.73%
Total votes		**82,003**	**100.00%**

==== Second District ====
Rep. Gustavo Tambunting won over former Rep. Jose Roilo Golez in a tight election.

Congressional Elections in Parañaque's Second District
Party	Candidate	Votes	%
**UNA**	**Gustavo “Gus” Tambunting**	**64,545**	**50.58%**
Independent	Jose Roilo Golez	61,493	48.19%
Independent	Pacifico Rosal	881	0.69%
Lakas	Pete Montaño	666	0.52%
Total votes		**127,585**	**100.00%**

=== City Councilors ===
==== First District ====
City Council Election in Parañaque's First District
Party	Candidate	Votes	%
**Liberal**	**Roselle Nava**	**58,130**	**10.09%**
**Liberal**	**Brilliante "Bok" Inciong**	**57,475**	**9.98%**
**Liberal**	**Ricardo "Eric" Baes**	**56,207**	**9.76%**
**Liberal**	**Joan Villafuerte-Densing**	**54,555**	**9.47%**
**Liberal**	**Vandolph Quizon**	**42,767**	**7.42%**
**PMP**	**Jose Maria "Jomari" Yllana**	**41,861**	**7.26%**
**Liberal**	**Marvin Santos**	**41,638**	**7.23%**
**Liberal**	**Pablo Gabriel Jr.**	**39,551**	**6.86%**
PMP	Julius Anthony "Jun" Zaide	39,172	6.80%
Liberal	Vincent Ace Mangosing	35,453	6.15%
Nacionalista	Jaime Delos Santos	28,019	4.86%
PMP	Hubert Webb	27,099	4.70%
PMP	Edward Co	19,149	3.32%
PMP	Benito Aragon	12,346	2.13%
PMP	Angel Delfin	5,829	1.01%
PGP	Danilo Lopez	5,141	0.89%
Lakas	Ruel Andaluz	4,309	0.74%
NUP	Nick Frisco	2,752	0.47%
Lakas	Elvis Tambolero	2,505	0.43%
Lakas	Danny Talam	1,882	0.32%
Total votes		**575,840**	**100.00%**

==== Second District ====
City Council Elections in Parañaque's Second District
Party	Candidate	Votes	%
**Liberal**	**Vincent Kenneth "Binky" Favis**	**83,084**	**10.21%**
**NPC**	**Viktor Eriko "Wahoo" Sotto**	**79,757**	**9.80%**
**PMP**	**John Ryan Yllana**	**76,352**	**9.39%**
**Liberal**	**Edwin "Bong" Benzon**	**74,672**	**9.18%**
**PDP–Laban**	**Merlie "Miles" Antipuesto**	**72,128**	**8.87%**
**Liberal**	**Giovanni "Juvan" Esplana**	**68,811**	**8.46%**
**Liberal**	**Jacqueline "Jackie" Bustamante-Mendoza**	**67,993**	**8.36%**
**Liberal**	**Maritess "Tess" De Asis**	**67,040**	**8.24%**
UNA	Kenneth Amurao	63,475	7.80%
UNA	Yeng Bernabe	56,313	6.92%
UNA	Daniel Santos	32,611	4.01%
UNA	Rudy Avila	13,147	1.61%
UNA	Manolito Zulueta	9,753	1.19%
UNA	Michael Antonio Bello	8,868	1.09%
UNA	Jerry Ong	7,841	0.96%
UNA	Ronald Macaraig	7,826	0.96%
PGP	Armando Razonable	6,572	0.80%
PGP	Vien Lawrence Gabato	6,483	0.79%
PGP	Frances Soliven-Quebec	6,399	0.77%
PGP	Dorotheo Sayajon	3,977	0.48%
Total votes		**813,102**	**100.00%**
