= Enteng the Dragon =

- Directed by: Romy Villaflor
- Screenplay by: Tony S. Mortel
- Story by: Tony S. Mortel; Romy Villaflor; Roy Vera Cruz
- Starring: Dolphy; Vandolph
- Cinematography: Amado De Guzman
- Edited by: Efren Jarlego
- Music by: Danny Tan
- Distributed by: RVQ Productions
- Release date: July 14, 1988
- Country: Philippines
- Language: Filipino

Enteng the Dragon is a 1988 Philippine comedy film directed by Romy Villaflor and written by Tony S. Mortel. It is a parody of the film Enter the Dragon.

== Plot ==
The story revolves around \ Enteng (Dolphy) a vendor of a mobile food house in China Town. Enteng is known for his humor, and a journalist and star reporter named Rowena (Dang Cecilio) was interested to cover his story after her Editor-in-Chief saw him as worthy of human interest. Kuto (Vandolph), a young boy that he found sleeping in his food wagon, led him to the shrine of the monks, that sealed his destiny as a vigilante and hero.

== Cast ==
- Dolphy as Enteng
- Vandolph Quizon as Kuto
- Dang Cecilio as Rowena
- Eddie Garcia as the Evil Leader
- Monica Herrera as Christina
- Monsour del Rosario
- Rommel Valdez
- Tsing Tong Tsai
- Panchito
- Babalu
- Don Pepot
- Che-Che Sta. Ana
- Roy Aoyama
- Ros Olgado
- Ernie Ortega
- Estrella Querubin

== Production ==
The film was produced by the RVQ Productions, a production owned by Dolphy himself.

== Release ==
The film was released on July 14, 1988.

== Accolades ==
Award-Giving Body	Category	Recipient	Result
1989 FAMAS Awards
1989 FAMAS Awards	Best Picture - Comedy	Enteng the Dragon	Won
1989 FAMAS Awards	Best Child Actor	Vandolph	Won
