= Bullet (1999 film) =

Philippine action film

- Directed by: Cesar Montano
- Written by: Cesar Montano; Bien Ojeda
- Produced by: Vincent del Rosario III; Veronique del Rosario-Corpus
- Starring: Cesar Montano
- Cinematography: Romy Vitug
- Edited by: Joyce Bernal
- Music by: Edwin "Kiko" Ortega
- Production company: Viva Films
- Distributed by: Viva Films
- Release date: July 7, 1999
- Running time: 100 minutes
- Country: Philippines
- Language: Filipino

Bullet is a 1999 Philippine action film co-written and directed by Cesar Montano on his directorial debut, who stars in the title role.

The film is streaming online on YouTube.

== Cast ==
- Cesar Montano as Perfecto "Bullet" Campiones Jr.
- Sunshine Cruz as Mabel
- Jay Manalo as Ferdie
- Celia Rodriguez as Flor
- Amy Austria as Ellie
- Rommel Montano as Joel
- Jethro Dionisio as himself
- Spanky Manikan as General
- Cris Vertido as Perfecto "Peping" Campiones Sr.
- Precious Valencia as Shirley
- Don Pepot as Mayor
- Christian Alvear as Rey
- Eugene Domingo
