= Home Along Da Riles =

Philippine sitcom

- Title card
- Genre: Sitcom
- Written by: Loida Viriña; Jose Bartolome; Divino Reyes; Isko Salvador; Woodrow Serafin; Rhandy Reyes
- Directed by: Johnny Manahan (1992–1996); Victor de Guzman (1996–2003); Apollo Arellano (1998–2003)
- Starring: Dolphy
- Theme music composer: Homer Flores
- Opening theme: "Home Along Da Riles" by Dolphy, Vandolph, Claudine Barretto, Gio Alvarez and Smokey Manaloto
- Country of origin: Philippines
- Original language: Tagalog
- No. of episodes: 535

Production
- Executive producer: Linggit Tan
- Running time: 90 minutes (1992–2001); 60 minutes (2001–2003)

Original release
- Network: ABS-CBN
- Release: December 23, 1992 – August 10, 2003

Related
- Home Along da Airport; Home Along Da Riles Da Movie; Home Along Da Riles 2; Home Along Da Riles Da Reunion

Home Along Da Riles (lit. 'home along the rails' or 'home along the railroad') is a Philippine television sitcom series broadcast by ABS-CBN. The title of the series is a title pun of the Home Alone franchise. Directed by Johnny Manahan, Victor de Guzman and Apollo Arellano, it stars Dolphy. It aired from December 23, 1992 to August 10, 2003, and was replaced by Ang Tanging Ina.

Some of the episodes are still available in ABS-CBN and Jeepney TV.

== Premise ==
The series follows the lives of the Cosme family (Note: The name uses a "C" rather than a "K". Multiple official citations confirm this spelling. Major media outlets and the network that produced the show document the character's name as Kevin Cosme. While some online fan wikis occasionally use the phonetic spelling "Kosme", all official promotional materials, network press releases, and major journalistic articles consistently spell it with a "C". Refer to this ABS-CBN article: and ABS-CBN Youtube sources: ,, to see it.) and their neighbors living beside the railroad tracks. The family's patriarch, Kevin Cosme, serves as the breadwinner while dealing with the everyday problems of raising his five children, his long-time love interest Aling Azon, his brothers-in-law, and the people at the placement agency he works, including the antagonistic assistant, Steve. Despite these challenges, the family often finds themselves in a variety of hilarious misadventures, nonsensical situations, and heartfelt life lessons.

== Cast and characters ==
=== Main cast ===
- Dolphy as Mang Kevin Cosme – The cheerful, hardworking, helpful, and kind widowed patriarch of the Cosme family, who lives beside the railroad tracks with his five children (one is adopted). He originally worked as a chef but was fired after a kitchen accident. He later became a messenger/janitor at the Lagdameo Placement Agency while hoping to be sent overseas someday to work as a cook.
- Nova Villa as Aling Corazon "Azon" Madamba-Cosme – Mang Kevin's former lover, later sister-in-law, who works in a real estate industry. Over the course of the series, it is revealed that Kevin and Azon were once lovers who hoped to get married someday, but Kevin accidentally eloped with and married her twin sister, Asuncion "Sion" Madamba, instead, and had children with her, causing Azon to become angry and resentful toward Kevin. Despite their past, Azon never misses an opportunity to express her love for Kevin and also looks after his children after Sion's death. Azon has a love-hate relationship with Kevin and cannot change the fact that she still loves him. They eventually get married, fulfilling Azon's long-held dream.
- Cita Astals (1992-1997; regular, 1997-2003; recurring) as Hillary Lagdameo – Mang Kevin's boss and the owner of the Lagdameo Placement Agency who is very understanding of him. In the third season, the agency closes down due to bankruptcy. Hillary sadly fired all of her employees, including Steve, Kevin, Linggit, Sheryl, and Nonie. The agency is later replaced by the Danarra Resort, owned by the wealthy businessman Boss Tino. Before leaving, Hillary helps Kevin and Steve secure new jobs at the resort.
- Bernardo Bernardo as Esteban "Steve" Carpio – An assistant at the Lagdameo Placement Agency who is also Hillary's cousin and Mang Kevin's archnemesis. In the third season, after the agency closes, Steve loses his job but is later assigned to work at the Danarra Resort alongside Kevin, where their rivalry continues.
- Smokey Manaloto as Billiones "Bill" Cosme – The eldest of Mang Kevin's four biological children, Bill is a working student in college, taking up commerce. He is depicted in the series as a handsome man with a long string of failed courtships.
- Gio Alvarez as Roberto "Bob" Cosme – The second in the Cosme brood, Bob is a mass communication freshman in college, who also plans to work in a band to augment the family's income. However, he and his friends always get into trouble. He got married early to his classmate Lorie.
- Claudine Barretto (1992-1997; regular, 1998-2003; recurring) as Rebecca "Bing" Cosme – Mang Kevin's only daughter. Bing is a pretty and smart high school senior who attracts many suitors. She moved out of the house upon entering college and went to the U.S. with the help of paternal aunt Matilda Cosme (Celia Rodriguez). The latter was a plot hook inserted as Barretto left the show from 1997 to 1999 to focus on Mula sa Puso due to other showbiz commitments. She came back towards the end of the series, now engaged to an African-American.
- Vandolph Quizon as Baldomero "Baldo" Cosme – Mang Kevin's youngest son. Baldo loves to play and eat and is spoiled by Aling Azon despite getting low grades in school.
- Maybelyn dela Cruz as Maybelyn "Maybe" Madamba – Aling Azon's adopted daughter who is also Baldo and Estong's playmate.
- Boy 2 Quizon as Ernesto "Estong" Cosme – A young boy who lives beside the railroad tracks. He is the son of Aling Azon's laundrywoman, Aling Iring (played by Alicia Alonzo) and is constantly abused by his alcoholic stepfather, Max (played by Max Alvarado). Estong is the best friend and playmate of Baldo and Maybe, and frequently stays at the Cosme household, becoming close to Mang Kevin. After Aling Iring's death, Kevin takes Estong into the Cosme family, where he is treated as one of their own and eventually becomes Mang Kevin's adopted son.
- Babalu (1994–1998) as Ricardo "Ritchie" Madamba – One of Aling Azon's two half-brothers, Ritchie is greedy and determined to claim the land where Aling Azon and Mang Kevin live, insisting on his rights to the property. He makes a living as a pedicab driver. He is also a gluttonous man and likes to eat the food served by his half-sister or half-brother-in-law. Following Babalu’s death in 1998, the character was written out, with Ritchie said to have migrated to America.
- Carding Castro (1998–2003) as Elvis Madamba – The second of Aling Azon's two half-brothers, Elvis is just as greedy as Ritchie and owns Ritchie's pedicab. He replaced the character of Ritchie after Babalu's death in 1998.
- Nikki Valdez (1997-2002) as Becky Cosme – One of Mang Kevin's two nieces, Bessie was introduced to the show during Bing's temporary absence as a young teenager studying in Manila.
- Paula Peralejo (2000-2003) as Bessie Cosme – The second of Mang Kevin's two nieces.
- Aurora Halili as Lorendina "Lorie" Gales-Cosme – Bob Cosme's classmate and girlfriend, who later becomes his wife.
- Ces Quesada as Brigida "Bridge" Gales – Lorie's wealthy and arrogant mother. She frequently looks down on the Cosme family and often exchanges insults with Azon.

=== Supporting ===
- Dang Cruz as Roxanne – The nosy, yet trustworthy household helper of Aling Azon who provides comic relief on the show.
- Joymee Lim (1992-1997) as Linggit – A secretary in the Lagdameo Placement Agency and the only "normal" person in the office who is quiet and cheerful. In the third season, following the closure of the agency, she is fired along with Sheryl and Nonie and is written out of the series.
- Sherilyn Reyes (1992-1997) as Sheryl – A secretary in the Lagdameo Placement Agency who is dumb and clumsy. In the third season, following the closure of the agency, she is fired along with Linggit and Nonie and is written out of the series.
- Erica Fife (1992-1997) as Nonie – A secretary in the Lagdameo Placement Agency who grew up in the States thus her Tagalog is bad. In the third season, following the closure of the agency, she is fired along with Linggit and Sheryl and is written out of the series.
- Tommy Angeles (1992–2000) as Mang Tomas – Owner of a sari-sari store right outside the Cosme residence, and one of Mang Kevin's closest friends. Following Tommy Angeles’ health confinement and later death in 2000, the character was written out, with Mang Tomas said to have died after being accidentally struck by a falling piano. His sari-sari store was later taken over by Totoy Buko.
- Jon Achaval as Victor "Pikong" Madamba – The father of Azon, Sion, Ritchie and Elvis. He is arrogant and alcoholic, and a domineering father-in-law to Kevin Cosme.
- Victoria Haynes (1998–2000) as Terya Madamba – Ritchie's energetic daughter that comedically and cluelessly foils Ritchie (and later on Elvis') get rich quick schemes. Introduced to the sitcom in the fourth season, she surprises the cast by claiming to be Ritchie's unknown daughter that even he did not know about. She grew up in the province with her wealthy mother played by Kris Aquino in flashbacks. She is later taken back by her mother and returns to the province.
- Moreen Guese (2000-2003) as Moreen Madamba – Ritchie's second daughter from another woman. Introduced after her father's migration to America, she has never met him and is left under the care of her uncle Elvis and aunt Azon.
- John Amos Tan as Moymoy (1997-2003) – A street-kid adopted by the Cosmes who becomes very close with Terya and later with Moreen.
- Alice Dixson (2000-2001) as Ms. Sion – A wealthy woman who shares the same name as Kevin's late wife. A friend of Bridge, she becomes Kevin's love interest and the two plan to marry, much to Azon's jealousy and heartbreak. They eventually break up, and Kevin realizes that Azon is the one he truly loves.
- Vhong Navarro (1998-2000) as Hercules – An adopted son of Mang Kevin who had long been forgotten by the family. He later returns and is warmly welcomed back by the Cosmes. He also has epilepsy and frequently collapses whenever he is stress or shouted at. He later leaves to work in Spain.
- Leo Gamboa as Totoy Buko – Storekeeper of Mang Tomas' sari-sari store who takes over him. He replaced the character of Tomas after the ultimately health confinement of Tommy Angeles until his death in 2000.
- Angela Velez as Lakita/Barbie Doll – Bill Cosme’s long-time girlfriend, whom he nicknames "Barbie Doll" due to the shape of her body. In the end, they broke up and she was married to an American.
- Bentot Jr. as Budoy – Lakita's brother who is known for his childlike behavior.
- Dinky Doo Jr. as Simeon
- Miaflor as Darling
- AJ Hipolito (1998-2000) and Angeli Gonzales (2000-2003) as Asuncion Brigida Kevina "ABK" Cosme – Bob and Lorie's daughter who was named after her grandparents (Sion, Bridge and Kevin).
- Dennis Padilla as Paktol – Mang Kevin's nemesis at work.
- Rica Peralejo as Trisha – Bill Cosme's former girlfriend.
- Noel Trinidad (1997-2000) as Boss Tino – The wealthy owner of the Danarra Resort, where Mang Kevin and Steve begin working after the closure of the Lagdameo Placement Agency.
- Lara Morena as Liwie – A sexy cashier at the Danarra Resort, where Mang Kevin works.
- Daniel Pasia as Atlas - A waiter at the Danarra Resort, where Mang Kevin works.
- Anjanette Abayari as Annette – A new sexy employee at the Danarra Resort who catches the attention of Boss Tino and becomes the apple of his eye.
- Marivic Martin
- Boyong Baytion as Boy Riles – A well-known thief and a neighbor of the Cosme family.
- Alvin Espino as Boy Pepe – A member of the Sunog-Baga.
- Niño Virinia as Boy Tulis – A member of the Sunog-Baga.
- Clay Marco Jr. as Boy Salida – A member of the Sunog-Baga.
- Cedie Calais as Boy Masid – A member of the Sunog-Baga.
- Scotts Marlo Quirante as Don Quirante – A member of the Sunog-Baga.
- Ramon Abon Jr. as Botlog Yosi – A member of the Sunog-Baga.
- Edwin Dargantes as Siopao – A member of the Sunog-Baga.
- Kitty Manalo, Alex Villaflores, Danny Hernandez, Joel de la Cruz, Presley Cruz, Rudy de la Cruz, William Ganadores, Caloy Alde, Pol Gutierrez, Betong and Ed Tahaw as the other members of the Riles Boys or the Sunog-Baga – They are the neighbors and friends of the Cosme family who are often seen hanging around the railroad community, helping the Cosmes at times while also causing trouble for Mang Kevin. They serve as the representation of Filipino tambays.

== Films ==
Star Cinema made two films in junction to the series: Home Along da Riles da Movie (1993) and Home Along da Riles 2 (1997). A third movie is set to release in June 2026 entitled Home Along Da Riles Da Reunion.

The story of Home Along da Riles da Movie goes deeper into Kevin's history revealing he was an all-star chef at a hotel but was fired after an explosion in the hotel's kitchen, ending up with him working as a messenger in a placement agency thereafter. The family was also implicated from trying to expose corrupt practices of a corrupt politician to the Presidential Anti-Crime Task Force, which nearly cost their lives.

Home Along da Riles 2 follows Kevin and his family after he "inherits" a family estate from his late uncle. While at the family estate, the family solves the real problem of why a business tycoon was trying to seize its inheritance, which the tycoon also owns and operates the polluted factory near the estates' land.

In 2014, the first film was digitally restored into HD and was to be released via Kapamilya Blockbusters.

A third film entitled Home Along Da Riles: Da Reunion was released in theaters on June 17, 2026. Boy 2 Quizon (Estong) will also direct this film. Claudine Barretto, who was one of the original cast, shared a teaser on her Instagram about an upcoming series set to release in 2026.

Year	Title	Notes	Ref.
1993	Home Along Da Riles Da Movie	Release: August 26, 1993; Production Company: Star Cinema and RVQ Productions Inc.	
1997	Home Along Da Riles 2	Release: May 28, 1997; Production Company: Star Cinema	
2026	Home Along Da Riles Da Reunion	Release: June 17, 2026; Production Company: Riles Productions	

== Reception ==
Dolphy was able to separate all his notable characters that made him a wonderful actor. According to critics, Dolphy was able to turn his character Mang Kevin Cosme into a unique kind of father that Filipinos adore, and his characters as Facifica Falayfay, Fefita Fofonggay, Omeng Satanasia and John Puruntong into other timeless characters that has made a mark in people's minds. Until he was old and ailing, Dolphy had been making movies like Father Jejemon.

== Timeslot ==
Home Along Da Riles aired on Wednesday nights from December 23, 1992, to February 1995. In February 1995, the show was transferred to Thursday nights until September 6, 2001, and was replaced by Attagirl. The network shifted its timeslot to Monday nights on September 10 to October 15, 2001, replacing Kaya ni Mister, Kaya ni Misis and was replaced by FPJ Action Cinema. It was finally transferred to Sunday evening from October 28, 2001, until its finale on August 10, 2003, as part of ABS-CBN's 50th anniversary.

== Spin-off ==
Home Along Da Airport
- Title card
- Genre: Sitcom
- Based on: Home Along Da Riles
- Written by: Divino Reyes; Loida Viriña; Woodrow Serafin; Cynthia De Castro; Ricky Victoria; Josel Garlitos; Gervie Villanueva
- Directed by: Apollo Arellano
- Starring: Dolphy
- Theme music composer: Homer Flores
- Opening theme: "Home Along Da Airport" by Dolphy, Vandolph, Smokey Manaloto, Camille Prats, Angel Gonzales, Aubrey Miles and John Wayne Sace
- Country of origin: Philippines
- Original language: Filipino
- No. of episodes: 75

Production
- Executive producer: Dagang Vilbar
- Running time: 40 minutes

Original release
- Network: ABS-CBN
- Release: August 16, 2003 – January 22, 2005

Home Along Da Airport is a Philippine television sitcom series broadcast by ABS-CBN. The series is the spin-off and sequel to Home Along Da Riles. Directed by Apollo Arellano, it stars Dolphy. It aired from August 16, 2003, to January 22, 2005, replacing Arriba, Arriba! and was replaced by Quizon Avenue.

=== Premise ===
Mang Kevin Cosme and his family's exploits after they decided to vacate their former home near the railroad tracks after being persuaded by the head of the MMDA (played by Bayani Fernando as himself in the original show's penultimate episode) due to safety concerns, eventually settling in a small community situated near the city airport. Despite having finished sending all of his children to school, Mang Kevin still continues with his job now at a TV Station, while Aling Azon, with whom Mang Kevin shares his household, plies her new trade in the meat-selling business. In their new community the Cosmes are joined by their new neighbors, friends and acquaintances who bond over their features common continuing problem—dealing with the regular jet noise from the airplanes taking off and landing from the nearby airport.

=== Cast ===
==== Main Cast ====
- Dolphy as Mang Kevin Cosme - The patriarch of the Cosme family. He relocates his family to a small community near a city airport after leaving their home in the railroad due to safety concerns and demolition. He resigns from his placement agency job and begins working at a TV Station to support his growing family.

==== Supporting Cast ====
- Nova Villa as Aling Azon M. Cosme - Kevin’s loving and hardworking wife and the "Tita Nanay" of the Cosme siblings. After relocating, she starts a meat-selling business. She later becomes pregnant and gives birth to their youngest child, Kevin Jr.
- Smokey Manaloto as Bill Cosme - Still lives with his father and Tita Nanay. He remains unemployed and struggles to find a permanent job.
- Angeli Gonzales as ABK Cosme - The daughter of Bob and Lorie, and Mang Kevin’s granddaughter. She is under the care of her paternal grandparents, Kevin and Azon Cosme.
- Vandolph Quizon as Baldo Cosme - Mang Kevin's youngest son, who continues his studies and is now in college.
- Dennis Padilla as Boss Paktol - Mang Kevin’s former workplace nemesis, now his boss at the TV Station. He frequently visits the community and becomes close friends with Don Long.
- Long Mejia as Don Long - Ritchie’s arrogant stepson who inherits half of Aling Azon’s land despite not being biologically related. He often causes trouble in the community and becomes close friends with Paktol.
- Camille Prats as Samantha "Sam" - Don Long's daughter and also Baldo's love interest.
- Aubrey Miles as J.Lo - A beauty parlor owner near the Cosme Household who is very bad at English. She becomes a close friend of the Cosme family.
- Alyssa Gibbs as Sofie - J.Lo's cousin and a fan of the Cosme and knows all about their family history.
- John Wayne Sace as Teddy - Sofie's love-interest. ABK has a crush on him too.
- Maverick & Ariel as Matt & Jeff - Brothers from Las Vegas, Nevada, who own a thrift store in the community.

=== Canonicity ===
Although Home Along Da Airport was produced and aired as a sequel to Home Along Da Riles, it is not considered part of the continuity established by Home Along Da Riles: Da Reunion (2026).

The reunion film serves as the direct continuation of the original sitcom and primarily acknowledges events, characters, and storylines from Home Along Da Riles. Several storylines introduced in Home Along Da Airport, including the relocation of the Cosme family near an airport and the introduction of numerous new supporting characters, are not referenced in the 2026 film. The cast and promotional materials for Da Reunion instead focus on the original railroad community and its residents.

As a result, Home Along Da Airport is regarded as an alternate continuation or a separate sequel continuity rather than part of the main canon followed by Da Reunion film. However, no official statement has been issued by the filmmakers formally declaring the series non-canon. Therefore, its canonical status remains a matter of interpretation.

== Awards and nominations ==
Year	Award	Category	Result	Reference
1993	PMPC Star Awards for Television	Best Comedy Show	Won	
1994	PMPC Star Awards for Television	Best Comedy Show	Won	
2003	2003 Catholic Mass Media Awards	Best Comedy Program	Won	

== See also ==
- List of programs broadcast by ABS-CBN
- John en Marsha
- Quizon Avenue
