= Paula Peralejo =

Filipino actress

- Born: Maria Elena Paula Bautista Peralejo; June 29, 1984 (age 42); Manila, Philippines
- Other name: Paula Peralejo-Fernandez
- Education: University of the Philippines Diliman (BS)
- Occupations: Actress, businessperson
- Years active: 1994–2006
- Spouse: Charlie Fernandez (m. 2013)
- Children: 1
- Relatives: Rica Peralejo (sister); Nica Peralejo (niece); Nico Peralejo (brother); Heaven Peralejo (niece)

Maria Elena Paula Bautista Peralejo-Fernandez (Tagalog: [ˈpaʊla pɛɾaˈlɛho]; born June 29, 1984) is a former Filipino actress. She is the younger sister of actress Rica Peralejo and the aunt of actress Heaven Peralejo.

== TV career ==
Peralejo was among the cast of ABS-CBN's Ang TV.

In 1995, she made her film debut as Jessie in Star Cinema's Sarah... Ang Munting Prinsesa.

In most of her teen years, she was paired with Patrick Garcia.

In 1997, Peralejo was relaunched as a teen actress via ABS-CBN's Talent Center's, now Star Magic, Star Circle Batch 4 and joined the cast of Gimik in the same year. She portrayed the role of Joie in the hit teleserye Mula sa Puso.

When Gimik ended, she was cast as Anne in Tabing Ilog in 1999.

== Personal life ==
Peralejo completed her Bachelor of Science in Philosophy, with a Tourism minor, in the University of the Philippines. She graduated on April 26, 2008, as magna cum laude.

On February 23, 2013, Peralejo married Charlie Fernandez in Filipiniana-themed wedding in Pinaglabanan Shrine (Sanctuario de Santo Cristo) in San Juan.

Peralejo is currently the general manager of her travel agency business Our Restless Feet Travel and Tours.

== Filmography ==
=== Television ===
Year	Title	Role	Notes	Source
1992–1997	Ang TV	Herself / various roles		
1995	Familia Zaragoza	Samantha		
1997	Mula sa Puso	Jowie Madrigal		
1997	Wansapanataym		Episode: "Tres Marias"	
1997–1998	Kaybol: Ang Bagong TV	Herself / various roles		
1997–1999	Gimik	Pauline Salveron		
1999–2003	Tabing Ilog	Angela 'Anne' de Guzman		
2000	Wansapanataym		Episode: "Dance Family"	
2000–2003	Home Along Da Riles	Bessie Kosme		
2002	Tanging Yaman: The Series	Melissa Espiritu	Episode: "Muling Buksan ang Puso"	
2006	Komiks Presents: Si Pardina at ang mga Duwende			

=== Film ===
Year	Title	Role	Notes	Source
1995	Sarah... Ang Munting Prinsesa	Jessie		
1995	Eskapo	Gina Lopez		
1995	Asero	Young Vivian		
1996	Ang TV: The Adarna Adventure	King's niece		
1997	Flames: The Movie	Yvette	Segment: "Pangako"	
1997	I Do, I Die! Dyos Ko Day	Paula Mendiola		
1998	Nagbibinata	Maya Basa	Credited as "Paola Peralejo"	
1998	Ala Eh Con Bisoy Hale Hale Hoy	Myra		
1999	Mula sa Puso: The Movie	Jowie Madrigal		
