= I Do? I Die! (D'yos Ko Day!) =

- Directed by: Efren "Loging" Jarlego
- Screenplay by: Ipe Pelino; Woodrow Serafin; Jose Bartolome; Divino Reyes
- Produced by: Charo Santos-Concio; Malou N. Santos
- Starring: Edu Manzano; Agot Isidro; Babalu; Redford White
- Cinematography: Oscar Querijero
- Edited by: Edgardo Jarlego
- Music by: Mon del Rosario
- Production company: Star Cinema
- Distributed by: Star Cinema
- Release date: April 16, 1997
- Running time: 96 minutes
- Country: Philippines
- Languages: Filipino; English

I Do? I Die! (D'yos Ko Day!) is a 1997 Filipino comedy film directed by Efren Jarlego. The film stars Edu Manzano, Agot Isidro, Babalu, and Redford White, the film revolves around two workers, whose failed attempt to take revenge on their cruel boss after being fired unexpectedly leads them to help him rebuild his broken family. A play on the words, specifically a pun, that functions as a comedic title and a recurring joke. It also stars Paolo Contis, Paula Peralejo, Carlo Aquino, Ceejay Ramos, Glydel Mercado, Delia Razon, Marita Zobel, and Pocholo Montes.

Produced by Star Cinema, the film was theatrically released on April 16, 1997.

== Premise ==
Bernie (Edu Manzano), and Helena’s (Agot Isidro) marriage is about to dismantle. However, their witty and mischievous children Paolo (Paolo Contis), Paula (Paula Peralejo), Carlo (Carlo Aquino), and CJ (Ceejay Ramos) will not let it happen. In order to save their parents’ marriage and family, the children team-up with two hilarious factory workers Domeng (Babalu), and Mokong (Redford White). Will they succeed in letting their parents re-learn the value of acceptance and family?

== Plot ==
Bernie and Helena had a dysfunctional marriage due to Bernie's playboy behavior and his secretary flirting with him.

Domeng and Mokong were fired from their jobs with Bernie after accidentally being rude and falling asleep due to overnight tasks. They tried to find work in various places, but Bernie was always the manager, whether at a construction firm or a country club, even while they acted as blind beggars on the street. This worsened the situation, leading Domeng and Mokong to seek revenge by robbing Bernie's home.

When Domeng and Mokong tried to hide in the trunk of a car, someone locked them inside. The car was then driven by Bernie to his vacation house in Baguio, with his secretary, unaware that Mokong and Domeng were hiding in the trunk.

Meanwhile, Bernie and Helena's marriage continued to worsen. Their kids tried to help by convincing Helena to follow Bernie to Baguio. When they arrived at the vacation house, Helena and her kids caught Bernie having an affair with his secretary and confronted them.

Bernie and Helena's kids left the house, taking the keys to the house and vehicles with them. They said they wouldn't give the keys back or unlock the house unless Bernie and Helena resolved their issues.

Mokong and Domeng finally escaped from the car. Believing that Bernie's family had left, they entered the house, unaware that Bernie and Helena were inside. They saw the kids driving the van and, upon entering the house, confronted Bernie and Helena.

When Bernie and Helena were cornered, Mokong and Domeng began robbing the house and escaped. Meanwhile, Bernie and Helena finally resolved their marriage problems. While their children were driving, they encountered Mokong and Domeng's vehicle, causing them to lose control. The van went to the edge of a cliff, on the brink of falling.

One of the kids managed to escape from the van and saw Mokong and Domeng. They went to the van and saved the rest, and then Bernie arrived to help. The kids survived, but the van fell off the cliff and exploded.

As a sign of gratitude, Bernie decided to give Mokong and Domeng their jobs back.

== Cast ==
- Edu Manzano as Bernardo "Bernie" Mendiola
- Agot Isidro as Helena "Helen" Mendiola
- Babalu as Domeng
- Redford White as Mokong
- Paolo Contis as Paolo Mendiola
- Paula Peralejo as Paula Mendiola
- Carlo Aquino as Carlo Mendiola
- Ceejay Ramos as CJ Mendiola
- Glydel Mercado as Carrie
- Delia Razon as Helena's mother
- Marita Zobel as Bernie's mother
- Pocholo Montes as Bernie's father
- Malou Crisologo as Helena's friend (as Malouh Crisologo)
- Minnie Aguilar as Helena's friend
- Cheng Avellana as Helena's friend
- Rhoda Autajay as Helena's friend
- Joji Isla as Supervisor at Antique shop (as Jojie Isla)
- Jon Achaval as Priest (as John Achaval)
- Cris Daluz as Mang Ambo (as Chris Daluz)
- Golda Inquito as Workout Buddy (uncredited)
