= Carding Castro =

Filipino actor (1933–2003)

- Born: Ricardo Castro; September 11, 1933; Manila, Philippine Islands
- Died: November 14, 2003 (aged 70); Las Vegas, Nevada
- Occupations: Actor, comedian, entertainer
- Years active: 1964–2003

Ricardo Castro (September 11, 1933 – November 14, 2003), better known as Carding Castro or Carding Cruz, was a Filipino actor, comedian and entertainer.

As an entertainer, Castro was part of the singing comic duo Reycard Duet, along with Rey Ramirez. The duo was established in 1954 and performed for over 40 years until 1997, when Ramirez died. After the latter's death, Castro remained active as a solo performer and for a few years was part of the ensemble cast of the ABS-CBN comedy sitcom Home Along Da Riles. He also did a few films with the late comedians Redford White and Babalu.

In 1961, Castro was credited with popularizing the "Dodompa" dance in Japan. He stated that he was inspired by the songs "Manhattan" and "How High the Moon" by Joe Loco in creating the dance.

Castro died of cardiac arrest in Las Vegas on November 14, 2003.

== Filmography ==
=== Film ===
- Austerity Love (1958) (as ReyCard Duet)
- Let's Go (1964) (as ReyCard Duet)
- Everybody, Dance (1964) (as ReyCard Duet)
- The Young Idols (1972) (as ReyCard Duet)
- Ibalik ang Swerti (1981) (as Reycard Duet)
- Yes, Yes, Yo Kabayong Kutsero (1989) (as ReyCard Duet)
- Katabi Ko'y Mamaw (1990) (as ReyCard Duet)
- Tik Tak Toys: My Kolokotoys (1999) ... Elvis
- Isprikitik: Walastik Kung Pumitik (1999) ... Marlon
- Tar-San (1999) as San (Final film appearance)

=== Television ===
- Kaya ni Mister, Kaya ni Misis (1997–2001) ... as Mario
- Magandang Tanghali Bayan (1998–1999)
- Home Along Da Riles (1998–2003) ... Elvis
