= Reycard Duet =

Filipino singing comic duo

- Castro (left) and Ramirez (right) in the early years of their career.

Background information
- Origin: Manila, Philippines
- Genres: OPM
- Years active: 1954–1997
- Labels: Alpha Musics; PolyEast Records (Formerly OctoArts Intl.)
- Past members: Carding Castro; Rey Ramirez

The Reycard Duet was a Filipino singing comic duo consisting of Carding Castro (also known as Carding Cruz) and Rey Ramirez. As a duo, Cruz and Ramirez had been entertaining audiences for over 40 years; Ramirez was known as the dashing singer while Cruz provided the comedy in every performance. The duet performed from 1954 to 1997, when Ramirez died. They were also known as ReyCards Duet or The Reycards.

== Career ==
Ramirez and Castro first teamed up in 1953 during a singing contest in Quiapo, Manila, where they won first prize. The two then decided to form a singing duo. In 1954, they started calling themselves the Reycard Duet. Reycard was simply the union of the member's names, Rey and Carding. They became the most famous entertainers at the Clover Theater and the Manila Grand Opera House, both in Manila. The Reycard Duet also performed in town fiestas, on television and radio in the 1950s.

In July 1966, the duo was one of the opening acts for the Beatles' performance at Rizal Stadium in Manila, along with Pilita Corrales.

In the 1960s the duo based themselves in the United States, which became their home for more than 40 years.

In the early 1990s, they hosted Awitawanan with Pilita Corrales on IBC 13. They also starred in comedies like Katabi Ko'y Mamaw and Yes, Yes, Yo, Kabayong Kutsero. They started their singing stint during the late 1950's when they were around 17 years old.

== Death ==
Ramirez died on August 30, 1997. Castro died of cardiac arrest in Las Vegas on November 14, 2003.

== Filmography ==
- Juan Tamad at Mr. Shooli: Mongolian Barbecue (Mongolian Barbecue) (1991)
- Ang Tabi Kong Mamaw (1990)
- Gaya-gaya... Puto-maya! (1977) ... as Rey/Carding
- Let's Do It: The Las Vegas Way (1970) ... as Rey/Carding
- Las Vegas A'go-go (1967)
- Alembong (1958)

== Songs ==
- Huwag Mong Ilayo by Reycard Duet
- Perslab II
- SANA'Y DI NA KITA INIBIG - Reycard Duet
- DON'T PLAY THAT SONG - Reycard Duet/DYNA /7418-A/Time: 2:48
- BUT NOW - Reycard Duet/DYNA/DN 7760-A/Time: 2:30/Arranged by Pablo Vergara/Words, Music and Direction by:Jessie C.Saclo
- YOU'VE GOT YOUR TROUBLE - Reycard Duet

== Awards ==
Year	Award giving body	Category	Nominated work	Results
1971	Awit Awards	Best Vocal Group	—N/a	Won
