= Alma Moreno =

Filipino actress and politician (born 1959)

The Honorable Alma Moreno

Barangay Councilor of Tambo, Parañaque
- Incumbent
- Assumed office October 30, 2023

Member of the Parañaque City Council from the 1st district
- In office June 30, 2007 – June 30, 2016

First Lady of Parañaque
- In role June 30, 1995 – June 30, 2004
- Mayor: Joey Marquez
- Preceded by: Dr. Rosario de Leon-Olivarez
- Succeeded by: Maria Fe C. Bernabe

Personal details
- Born: Venesa Moreno Lacsamana; May 25, 1959 (age 67) Cervantes, Ilocos Sur, Philippines
- Party: Lakas (2007–2012); Liberal (2012–2015); UNA (2015–2022)
- Spouses: Joey Marquez (m. 1989; ann. 2004) Fahad "Pre" Salic (m. 2009; div. 2014)
- Domestic partners: Rudy Fernandez (1976–1980; separated); Rodolfo Quizon Sr. (1981–1989; separated)
- Children: 7 (incl. Mark Anthony, Vandolph and Wynwyn)
- Profession: Actress, Politician

Venesa "Alma" Moreno Lacsamana (Tagalog: [ˈalmɐ moˈɾɛno]); born May 25, 1959) is a Filipino actress and politician.

== Early life ==
Alma Moreno was born as Venesa Moreno Lacsamana in Cervantes, Ilocos Sur to her parents Frank Lacsamana, from Pampanga, and Jean Moreno.

== Acting career ==
She appeared in her first movie as a Dama in Urduja with Amalia Fuentes, while her first starring role was in Ligaw na Bulaklak Part 2 ("Lost Flower") with Vic Silayan, which was her breakout film. The 1976 film was directed by National Artist for Film Ishmael Bernal.

From then until the late 1980s, Moreno starred in a number of revealing movies that were box office hits, earning her the title "Sex Goddess of Philippine Movies" of the 1970s and 1980s.

Bernal had also directed her in the acclaimed film, City After Dark, that premiered in 1980. Her other notable films include the 1993 Gawad Urian Best Picture, Makati Avenue Office Girls (directed by José Javier Reyes) and the 1977 Mga Bilanggong Birhen ("Incarcerated Virgins") (directed by Mario O'Hara and Romy Suzara).

Versatile for having starred in sexy, drama and comedy films, Moreno was also a presenter on several highly rated television variety shows in the 1980s for which she earned the title "Shining Star", as well as the weekly television drama anthology, Alindog, which explored the lives of modern Filipino women. Moreno is also a dancer, who popularised a sexy, high-cut outfit called the "Tangga" on her shows like The Other Side of Alma, Rated A and Loveli-Ness. She has been nominated in various film and TV acting awards for her dramatic and comedic performances.

In the early 2000s, Moreno divided her time between her professional commitments with GMA Network's primetime drama series Habang Kapiling Ka and situational comedy program Daboy en Da Girl; she balanced these with her personal commitment to helping the women and the poor in Parañaque through various socio-civic and community development projects. In 2002, she starred in her comeback film Kapalit. Recently, she was a resident judge of the defunct dance contest You Can Dance.

== Political career ==
Moreno became the First Lady of Parañaque when her husband, Joey Marquez, served as Mayor of Parañaque from 1995 to 2004. Moreno then ran for Mayor of Parañaque in 2004 but lost. In 2007, she was elected as Councilor of the city, and was re-elected in 2010. On September 24, 2008, the Parañaque prosecutor's office found probable cause for violation of Batas Pambansa 22 (also known as the Anti-Bouncing Check Law) against Moreno. The complaint Maya Media Arts Yielding Ads (Maya) Inc. accused Moreno of issuing P 390,000 rubber or bouncing checks for campaign materials. Moreno denied the charges and her bail bond was set at P30,000.

In 2012, Moreno became the first female National President of the Philippine Councilors League (PCL), where she previously served as National Secretary-General and National Executive Vice-president. In May 2012, she declared her intention to run for Senator in the 2013 elections under Lakas–CMD party. A few months later in September however, she announced that she had dropped her bid due to a lingering illness. She moved to the Liberal Party with her former husband Joey, and she ran again for Councilor in 2013. In 2014, she joined United Nationalist Alliance of Vice-president Jejomar Binay, and in 2015, Moreno confirmed that she will run for Senator under UNA. She filed her COC on October 14, 2015. She lost in the election placing 24th away from the Top 12 Circle.

On November 14, 2015, on ABS-CBN News Channel's Headstart, Karen Davila asked Moreno some questions regarding certain issues in the country including the Reproductive Health Law. The interview was widely shared after Moreno failed to coherently answer most of Davila's questions.

== Personal life ==
Moreno had a relationship with Rudy Fernandez, they have one son Mark Anthony Fernandez. She also had a relationship with the "King of Comedy", Dolphy Quizon, which produced one son, Vandolph. Moreno married actor-politician Joey Marquez. They produced four children: Em-em, Yeoj, Wynwyn and Vitto. The marriage was annulled in 2004. In 2001, she was diagnosed with multiple sclerosis.

She married Sultan Fahad "Pre" Salic, mayor of Marawi City, in 2009, in a traditional Muslim nikah. They have one daughter Alfa Salic. They divorced in 2014.
