= Ces Quesada =

Filipino actress

- Born: Cecilia Quesada; June 13, 1958 (age 68); Metro Manila, Philippines
- Occupations: Actress, host
- Years active: 1986–present
- Agent: Freelancer

Ces Quesada (Tagalog pronunciation: [kɛˈsada]; born June 13, 1958) is a Filipino freelance actress and TV host. Prior to acting, she taught Speech Communication and Theater Arts at the University of the Philippines.

== Filmography ==
=== Television ===
Year	Title	Role
1987–1990	Sic O'Clock News	Lilian Polly Catubusan Labaybay (Host); Presidentita
1989–1996	Eat Bulaga!	Herself/Co-Host
1990–1995	Buddy En Sol	
1992–2002	Home Along Da Riles	Bridgette
1996–1999	PG: Parents Guide	Herself/Co-Host
2005	Now and Forever: Ganti	Ditas
2006	Captain Barbell	Agnes
2006	Komiks Presents	Various
2007	Mga Kuwento ni Lola Basyang	Various
2007	Sine Novela: Kung Mahawi Man Ang Ulap	Chayong
2008	Sine Novela: Gaano Kadalas ang Minsan	Pilar Medrano
2008	Lovebooks Presents	Various
2008	Maynila	Various
2008–2009	Luna Mystika	Yaya Gina
2009	Maalaala Mo Kaya	Various
2009	Adik Sa'Yo	Aling Ising Domingo
2010	5 Star Specials	Various
2010	My Darling Aswang	Aling Idang
2011	Mars Ravelo's Captain Barbell	Tiya Lita
2011	Kung Aagawin Mo Ang Langit	Leila Quintana-Samonte
2012	Biritera	Simang
2012	Hindi Ka Na Mag-iisa	Gina
2012	Coffee Prince	Lorna Ochoa
2012	Precious Hearts Romances Presents: Paraiso	Apolonia "Poleng" Alipio
2012	Princess and I	Salve
2013	Annaliza	Carmelita "Milet" Ramos
2013	Maalaala Mo Kaya: Ilog	Episode Guest
2014	Maalaala Mo Kaya: Sanggol	Mercy
2014	Niño	Danita Delos Santos
2014–2015	Dream Dad	Carmen Lucas-Castro
2015	Ipaglaban Mo: Ang Aking Pagkatao	Fely Silos
2015	Princess in the Palace	Mayordoma Luz
2015	Walang Iwanan	Lola Ebe
2016	Eat Bulaga!	Herself/Judge
2016	Karelasyon: Tenant	Jean
2016	Alyas Robin Hood	Anita "Cha" Escano
2016	Pepito Manaloto: Ang Tunay na Kwento	Mercy San Diego
2016	Usapang Real Love	Mercidita 'Ninang Mercy' Delgado
2016	Dear Uge: Maids in Manahan	Sion
2017	Maalaala Mo Kaya: Bahay	Ludy
2017	Ipaglaban Mo: Tiwala	Estrella Cruz
2017	Trops	Doña Aurora Agoncilio
2017	I Heart Davao	Nerma Bernabe
2017	Hanggang Saan	Letty
2018	Since I Found You	Linda
2018	Playhouse	Josie Salazar
2019	Nang Ngumiti ang Langit	Ester
2020–2021	Almost Paradise	Cory
2022	Love You Stranger	Edna Malabanan
2022	Maria Clara at Ibarra	Tiya Isabel
2023	Royal Blood	Cleofe
2024	Padyak Princess	Ka Ernie dela Cruz
2025	Ghosting	Lola Nadia
2026	Sigabo	Mameng Aguilar

=== Film ===
Year	Title	Role
2001	Tatarin	Micaela
2002	Kailangan Kita	Lucci Dellosa
2003	Mr. Suave	Mrs. Suave
2004	All My Life	Pacita
2012	The Healing	Chona
2015	Invisible	Linda
2018	Kasal	Sally
2025	Call Me Mother	Ms. Reyes
2026	Home Along Da Riles Da Reunion	Bridge
