= Don Pepot =

Filipino comedian (1933–2022)

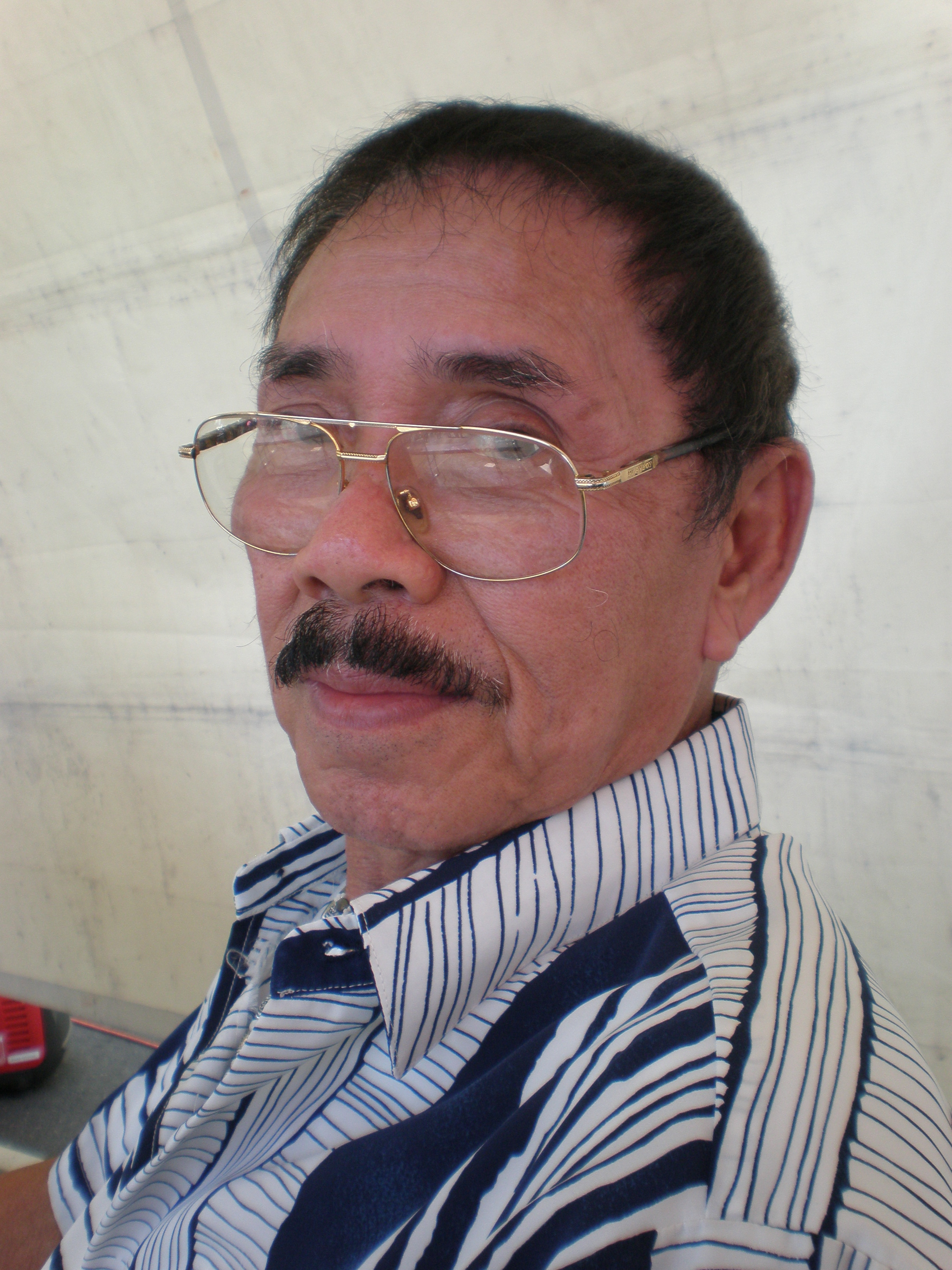
- Don Pepot in 2019
- Born: Ernesto Fajardo; November 6, 1933; Malabon, Rizal, Philippine Islands
- Died: January 18, 2022 (aged 88); Quezon City, Philippines
- Other names: Don Pepot, Pepot
- Occupations: Comedian, Actor, Radio Host, Screenplay writer
- Years active: 1964–2022

Ernesto Fajardo (November 6, 1933 – January 18, 2022), better known by his stage name Don Pepot, or simply Pepot, was a Filipino comedian, actor, radio host and writer.

== Early career ==
In the early years of his career, he was simply known as Pepot. Before his showbiz career he appeared in a travelling comedy show where he was in tandem with the late Apeng Daldal.

== Awards ==
He was awarded the Lou Salvador Sr. Memorial Award at the 2005 FAMAS Awards.

== Later career ==
In 2014, rumors on social media surfaced about his death. Fajardo issued a statement denying this, clarifying that he was retired in Malabon.

== Death ==
Pepot died on January 18, 2022, at the age of 88. He died at the Veteran Memorial Hospital due to pneumonia brought on by COVID-19.

== Filmography ==
Year	Title	Role	Note(s)	Ref(s).
1964	Show Business			
1967	The Pogi Dozen			
1967	Langit Pa Rin Kita			
1968	We Only Live Wais			
1971	Yari Naaaa!...			
1971	Make Laugh, Not War			
1971	I Love Mama, I Love Papa			
1971	Fiesta Extravaganza '71			
1972	The Pig Boss			
1972	The King Plaster			
1972	Love Pinoy Style			
1975	Kaming Matatapang ang Apog			
1977	Asiong Aksaya			
1978	Facundo Alitaftaf			
1978	Ang Dragon sa Maskarang Bakal			
1978	Butsoy			
1979	They Call Him Bruce Lee			
1979	Soldyer!			
1979	Isa ... Dalawa ... Tatlo ... Ang Tatay Kong Kalbo			
1979	Awat Na, Asiong Aksaya!			
1979	Kuwatog			
1980	Pinoy Boxer			
1980	Pedrong Palaka			
1980	Nognog			
1980	Juan Tamad Junior			
1980	Hepe			
1980	Darna at Ding			
1980	Deadly Fighters			
1980	Enteng-Anting			
1980	Tembong			
1981	Stariray			
1981	Ang Milyonaryong Gipit			
1981	Da Best in da West			
1981	Ang Maestro			
1981	Sidewalk Queen			
1981	Limbas ng Cavite			
1982	Si Ako at... Tres Muskiteros!	Direk Binog		
1982	Mga Kanyon ni Mang Simeon			
1982	Cross My Heart			
1982	Andres de Saya (Mabagsik Na Daw!)			
1982	Tatlo Silang Tatay Ko			
1985	Tu-yay and His Magic Payong	Kulas		
1985	Nagalit ang Patay sa Haba ng Lamay			
1985	Hee-Man: Master of None			
1985	John & Marsha '85 (Sa Probinsiya)			
1985	Inday Bote	Arbitro		
1985	The Crazy Professor			
1986	Rocky Four-ma			
1986	No Return, No Exchange			
1986	I Won, I Won (Ang S'werte Nga Naman)			
1986	Isang Platitong Mani			
1986	Payaso			
1987	My Bugoy Goes to Congress			
1987	Family Tree			
1987	Black Magic			
1988	Love Boat: Mahal Trip Kita	Roger Ramos		
1988	Leroy Leroy Sinta			
1988	Bobo Cop	Badong		
1988	Penoy... Balut			
1988	Puso sa Puso			
1988	7 Pasiklab sa Army			
1988	Enteng the Dragon			
1988	Ompong Galapong: May Ulo, Walang Tapon			
1988	One Two Bato, Three Four Bapor			
1989	Starzan: Shouting Star of the Jungle	Patsangga		
1989	Pardina at ang Mga Duwende			
1989	Bote, Dyaryo, Garapa			
1989	Everlasting Love			
1989	Last 2 Minutes			
1990	Hotdog			
1990	Twist: Ako si Ikaw, Ikaw si Ako	Don		
1990	Naughty Boys			
1991	Katabi Ko'y Mamaw	Security guard		
1991	Goosebuster			
1991	Zaldong Tisoy			
1992	Alabang Girls			
1992	Lacson, Batas ng Navotas			
1992	Eh, Kasi Bata			
1992	Takbo... Talon... Tili!!!	Security guard	"Mga Laruan nina Kiko, Tito at Toto" segment	
1993	Hulihin: Probinsiyanong Mandurukot			
1993	Aguinaldo			
1993	Ang Kuya Kong Siga			
1993	Pido Dida 3: May Kambal Na			
1993	Row 4: Baliktorians			
1993	Ano Ba 'Yan 2			
1994	Kadenang Bulaklak	Pepot		
1994	Si Ayala at Si Zobel	Lawyer		
1994	Wanted: Perfect Father			
1994	Shake, Rattle & Roll V	Dencio	"Impakto" segment	
1995	Pempe ni Sara at Pen	Tiyo Adonis		
1995	Home Sic Home	Kulas		
1995	Ang Tange Kong Pag-ibig	Tiyo Pekto		
1996	Dyesebel	Mang Kiko		
1996	SPO1 Don Juan: Da Dancing Policeman	Club owner		
1996	Huwag Mong Isuko ang Laban			
1996	A.E.I.O.U.			
1996	Oki Doki Doc: The Movie	Woody		
1996	Where 'D' Girls 'R'			
1997	Wow... Multo	V.D.		
1997	Onyok Tigasin			
1997	Lab en Kisses	Amboy		
1997	Huwag Na Huwag Kang Lalapit, Darling			
1997	Ang Pinakamahabang Baba sa Balat ng Lupa			
1998	Oki Doki Doc	Lolo Kap		
1998	Tong Tatlong Tatay Kong Pakitong Kitong			
1999	Tik Tak Toys: My Kolokotoys	Mang Tonyo		
1999	Bullet			
1999	Tar-San	Mang Rico		
2001	Super Idol			
2001	Bala Ko... Bahala Sa'yo			
2002	S2pid Luv	Don Francisco		
2003	A.B. Normal College: Todo Na 'Yan! Kulang Pa 'Yun!	Esteban		
2005	Lisensyadong Kamao			
2012	Si Agimat, si Enteng Kabisote at si Ako	Punong Ibrahim		
