= Maybelyn dela Cruz =

Filipino actress

Maybelyn Dela Cruz

Member of the Dagupan City Council
- In office June 30, 2010 – June 30, 2019

Personal details
- Born: December 20, 1982 (age 43) Philippines
- Party: KANP (2020–present)
- Other political affiliations: Liberal (2009–2020)
- Spouse: Michael Fernandez (m. 2008)
- Occupation: Actress

Maybelyn Dela Cruz-Fernandez (born December 20, 1982) is a Filipino actress and politician based in the Philippines. She was former child star and popularly known as the daughter of Nova Villa in Home Along Da Riles, a comedy series that aired on ABS-CBN. She served as former city councilor of Dagupan from 2010 to 2019.

== Career ==
Dela Cruz started as child star in Ang TV of ABS-CBN. She worked with the late Dolphy for eight years when she was cast as his 10-year-old niece in the television sitcom Home Along Da Riles from 1992.

She appeared on GMA Network's Impostora (2007) starring Sunshine Dizon and Iza Calzado, and Babangon Ako't Dudurugin Kita (2008) starring Yasmien Kurdi and Dina Bonnevie. She did also Gaano Kadalas Ang Minsan? (2008) starring Marvin Agustin, Camille Prats and Diana Zubiri, and Dapat Ka Bang Mahalin? (2009) starring Aljur Abrenica and Kris Bernal, showed on GMA-7. In 2009, she played the role originally played by Beth Bautista, as Choleng, in the TV remake of the 1985 film Tinik sa Dibdib with Nadine Samonte.

She performed also in theater the role of Maria Clara in Noli Me Tangere.

== Personal life ==
She is married to Dagupan councilor Michael Fernandez on January 20, 2008. The two met in 2005, during the National Assembly of the Philippine Councilors League (PCL). She was elected as number one city councilor in Dagupan in 2010. She is an active member of the Philippine National Red Cross (PNRC) for a long time, where she served as a member of the board of PNRC-Pangasinan.

Her lawyer father served as a three termer councilor of Las Piñas.

Maybelyn quit showbiz in 2015. Her last project was a drama anthology Karelasyon which formerly hosted by Carla Abellana and was previously aired on GMA Channel 7.

She returned to showbiz in 2021 in the anthology series Wish Ko Lang! as a guest role, and in 2022, she had her first regular role as Cara, the main antagonist and wicked arch-enemy of Hope/Bianca (Kate Valdez) in Unica Hija.

== Filmography ==
=== Film ===
| Year | Title | Roles | Reference(s): |
|---|---|---|---|
| 1993 | Home Along da Riles da Movie | Maybe Madamba | |
| 1994 | Megamol | Neneng | |
| 1996 | T.G.I.S.: The Movie | Maruja | |
| 1997 | Home Along Da Riles 2 | Maybe Madamba | |
| 2000 | Bahay Ni Lola | Anne | |
| 2004 | Kilig... Pintig.. Yanig | | |
| 2007 | Pitong Tagpo | Aida Mercado | |
| 2026 | Home Along Da Riles Da Reunion | Maybe Madamba | |

=== Television ===
| Year | Title | Roles |
|---|---|---|
| 1992–1997 | Ang TV | Herself |
| 1992–2003 | Home Along Da Riles | Maybe Madamba |
| 1992–2015 | Maalaala Mo Kaya | Various Roles |
| 1995–1999 | T.G.I.S. | Maruja |
| 1996 | Lovingly Yours | Herself/Guest |
| 1999 | Sing Galing | Herself/Guest |
| 1999 | Maynila | |
| 1999–2002 | Click | Rosario "Rose" Mercado |
| 2002–2003 | Kung Mawawala Ka | Guadalupe Valiente |
| 2002–2003 | Kahit Kailan | Rosette |
| 2002–2003 | Home Along da Airport | Maybe Madamba |
| 2005 | Magpakailanman (Episode: Bernabe Dodong Pasagad Story) | Emily |
| 2007 | Impostora | Doray |
| 2008 | Babangon Ako't Dudurugin Kita | Dolly Dela Cruz |
| 2008 | Sine Novela: Gaano Kadalas ang Minsan | Charley Villanueva-Paterno |
| 2009 | Sine Novela: Dapat Ka Bang Mahalin? | Cherry Ramos |
| 2009–2010 | Sine Novela: Tinik sa Dibdib | Choleng |
| 2010 | The Last Prince | Diwani Ogyna |
| 2010 | Bantatay | Lilian |
| 2011 | My Lover, My Wife | Ellen Torres |
| 2011–2012 | Amaya | Baylan Asinas |
| 2012 | Hindi Ka na Mag-iisa | Sofia |
| 2013 | Anna Karenina | Anaida "Nayda" Serrano |
| 2013–2014 | Magpakailanman | Sheila/Liza/Carolina |
| 2015 | Sabado Badoo | |
| 2015 | Karelasyon | |
| 2021 | Pepito Manaloto | Becca |
| 2022–2023 | Unica Hija | Cara Orosco-Rivas |
| 2023 | TiktoClock | Herself/Guest |
| 2023 | Family Feud | Herself/Guest |
| 2024 | Lilet Matias: Attorney-at-Law | Nymia Ozdemir |
| 2025 | Cruz vs Cruz | Maila Andrada |
