= Apeng Daldal =

Filipino actor

- Born: Serafin Gabriel; October 12, 1928; San Luis, Pampanga, Philippine Islands
- Died: February 9, 1992 (aged 63); Manila, Philippines
- Other name: Apeng Daldal
- Occupations: Actor, comedian, singer, writer
- Years active: 1963–1992

Serafin Gabriel (October 12, 1928 – February 9, 1992), better known by his stage name Apeng Daldal, was a Filipino actor, comedian, vaudevillian, singer and writer. His name came from his big set of teeth (Apeng) and for being a fast talker (Daldal).

== Later life ==
As an actor, Apeng Daldal performed in movies such as Magic Bilao (1965), Dobol Dribol (1979), and Libis ng Baryo (1964). Apeng Daldal's songs include "Sa Loob ng Sine" (Tagalog adaptation for The Music Played) and Magpapatuka nalang ako sa ahas.

== Death ==
Apeng Daldal's oldest daughter, Lina Regalado, stated that his father died of emphysema as a result of his long-term smoking habits. He died on February 9, 1992 in Manila, Philippines.

== Filmography ==
=== Movies ===
- Alias Golden Boy (1963)
- Mga Daliring Ginto (1964)
- Libis ng Baryo (1964)
- Babaing Kidlat (1964)
- Tatlong Mabilis sa Hong Kong (1965)
- Maskulado (1965)
- Magic Bilao (1965)
- Tatlong Mabilis (1965) as Apenger
- Pitong James Bonds (1966)
- The Pogi Dozen (1967)
- Langit Pa Rin Kita (1967)
- The Son of Dyango Meets Dorango Kid (1967)
- Dobol Dribol (1979)
- Kamakalawa (1981)

=== Television ===
- John en Marsha (1973–1990)
- Chicks to Chicks (1979–1987)
- Iskul Bukol (1978–1990)
- Baltic & Co. The Sitcom (1977–1978)
- Principe Abante (1979–1980)
- Champoy (1980–1985)
- Lovingly Yours, Helen (1984–1992)
- UFO: Urbano, Felicia & Others The Sitcom (1985–1986)
- Kalatog Pinggan (1987–1989)
- Plaza 1899 (1987–1988)
- Okay Ka, Fairy Ko! (1987–1989)
- Ang Manok Ni San Pedro (1988–1989)
- Hapi House (1988–1989) - guest
- Barrio Balimbing (1988–1989)
- Estudyante Blues (1990–1992)
- Love Me Doods (1990–1992)
- Cafeteria Aroma (1991–1992)
- Maalaala Mo Kaya (1991) - his last TV appearance
- Sabado Badoo (2015) - posthumously featured
- Tunay na Buhay (2015) - posthumously featured
