= Gio Alvarez =

Filipino actor (born 1976)

- Born: Giorgio Pietro Verano Alvarez; November 18, 1976 (age 49); Mandaluyong, Philippines
- Occupations: Actor, model
- Years active: 1991–present
- Height: 1.70 m (5 ft 7 in)

Giorgio Pietro Verano Alvarez (born November 18, 1976), better known as Gio Alvarez, is a Filipino actor in movies and television shows. He was an original member of Ang TV, a youth-oriented variety show in the Philippines.

== Career ==
He played as young Michael de Mesa in Hihintayin Kita Sa Langit, starring Richard Gomez and Dawn Zulueta. He played as Bob Cosme, the second son of Kevin Cosme played by Dolphy in Home Along Da Riles, showed in ABS-CBN from 1992 to 2003. In 2003, he appeared in TV series It Might Be You with John Lloyd Cruz and Bea Alonzo.

Alvarez appeared in afternoon drama series of GMA Network's Kung Mamahalin Mo Lang Ako with Camille Prats, Ehra Madrigal and Marian Rivera. He was included in the cast of Asian Treasures with Robin Padilla and Angel Locsin.

He played as husband of Manilyn Reynes in the Halloween episode "Kandila" of Maalaala Mo Kaya.

== Filmography ==
=== Film ===
Year	Title	Role
1991	Hihintayin Kita Sa Langit	Young Milo
1992	Gwapings: The First Adventure	
1993	Home Along Da Riles Da Movie	Bob Kosme
1993	Secret Love	
1994	Muntik na Kitang Minahal	
1995	Pare Ko	Abe
1995	Mangarap Ka	Glen
1996	Ang TV Movie: The Adarna Adventure	Prinsipe Juan
1997	Home Along Da Riles 2	Bob Kosme
1998	Labs Kita, Okey Ka Lang?	Cenon
1999	Alyas Pogi: Ang Pagbabalik	Tonio
2006	You Are the One	
2008	A Very Special Love	Vincent
2009	You Changed My Life	Vincent
2010	In Your Eyes	Storm's co-worker
2012	50/50 (short)	
2012	A Secret Affair	cousin of Rafi
2012	Vesuvius (short)	
2013	It Takes a Man and a Woman	Vincent
2013	Reptilia in Suburbia	
2016	Fruits N' Vegetables: Mga Bulakboleros	Visitor at U.P. Campus-Diliman
2016	Ecclesiastes	Eduardo
2018	I Love You, Hater	John
2019	I'm Ellenya L.	Daddy Toots
2024	Uninvited	Randall

=== Television ===
Year	Title	Role
1992–1997	Ang TV	Himself
1992–2003	Home Along Da Riles	Bob Kosme
1995–2006	ASAP	Himself / Host / Performer
1995	Maalaala Mo Kaya: Paddle	
1996	Maalaala Mo Kaya: Lubid	Jason
1997	Kapag May Katwiran... Ipaglaban Mo!	
1999–2003	Tabing Ilog	Boyet delos Santo
2003	Bayani	Gregorio del Pilar
2003	Home Along Da Airport	Bob Kosme
2003	It Might Be You	Ebony
2005–2006	Kung Mamahalin Mo Lang Ako	
2007	Asian Treasures	Cedric
2007	Zaido: Pulis Pangkalawakan	
2008	Lobo	Elton
2008	Komiks Presents: Tiny Tony	
2009	Maalaala Mo Kaya: Karnabal	Ramil
2010	Maalaala Mo Kaya: Plane Ticket	Joel
2011–2012	Maria la del Barrio	Anot
2012	Maalaala Mo Kaya: Korona (II)	Mark
2012	Maalaala Mo Kaya: Kandila (III)	Sonny
2012	Ikaw ay Pag-Ibig	Mark
2013	May Isang Pangarap	James
2013	Honesto	Benjie
2013	Maalaala Mo Kaya: Make-Up (II)	Alain
2014	Maalaala Mo Kaya: Liham	Father Renee
2014	Forevermore	Atty. Mateo Salazar
2015	Ipaglaban Mo!: Binasag na katahimikan	Pilo
2015	Karelasyon: Sulot	Mico
2015	Kapamilya, Deal or No Deal	Himself / Briefcase #20
2016	FPJ's Ang Probinsyano	Arabas Amaba
2016	Alyas Robin Hood	Jerico Sumilang
2016	Pepito Manaloto	Winston
2017	Alisto	Himself
2018	Wildflower	Ronald
2019	Ipaglaban Mo: Kuya	Henry Asuncion
2020	Dear Uge	Various
2021	Babawiin Ko ang Lahat	Greg Madrigal
2023	Luv Is: Caught in His Arms	Federico dela Cruz
2023	Sparkle U: #Ghosted	Liam
2024–2025	Shining Inheritance	Edwin Rodriguez
2024	It's Showtime	Himself
2025	FPJ's Batang Quiapo	Caloy Benito
2025	Love At First Spike	Larry Dumlao
2025	Cruz vs Cruz	Thimo
2026–present	Delivery Boi	Hector

== Discography ==
- Gio - only rap album recorded
- "Ang Huling El Bimbo" - soundtrack in the film Labs Kita, Okey Ka Lang?

== Awards ==
- 3rd Pista ng Pelikulang Pilipino Best Supporting Actor
