= Babalu (comedian) =

Filipino actor and comedian (1942–1998)

Pablo Sarmiento
- Babalu in Oki Doki Doc (1996)
- Born: Pablo Martin Sarmiento; June 28, 1942; Sampaloc, Manila, Philippines
- Died: August 27, 1998 (aged 56); Antipolo, Rizal, Philippines
- Resting place: Loyola Memorial Park; Parañaque, Philippines
- Occupations: Actor; comedian
- Years active: 1961–1998
- Spouses: Liwayway Sarmiento (first wife; separated); Lalaine Sarmiento (deceased; his partner till his death in 1998)
- Children: 3
- Relatives: Etang Discher (grandmother); Panchito Alba (uncle)

Pablo Martin Sarmiento (June 28, 1942 – August 27, 1998), better known as Babalu, was a Filipino comedian and actor. His screen name was a reference to his long, sharp chin ("babà" is the Filipino term for "chin"; babalu is a Filipino gay term derived from it), which was sometimes a subject of on-screen jokes, usually by himself.

== Personal life ==
Babalu grew up in Sampaloc, Manila in his grandmother's home with his mother, one sister and three brothers. Babalu was the nephew of comedian Panchito Alba and the grandson of character actress Etang Discher. Babalu fathered three children (1 boy and 2 girls). He was initially married to Liwayway Sarmiento, whose relationship bore him a son named Lyndon Sarmiento. The couple would eventually separate because of Babalu's alcoholism, and Liwayway would migrate to live in the United States but they would still maintain a close relationship up until his death. For several years he was living with his long-time partner, Lalaine, who eventually became his second wife prior to his death, with whom he had two daughters.

== Acting career ==
Babalu is considered "one of the most famous, beloved, and greatest comedians" in the Philippines. Initially serving as his uncle's personal assistant in the 60's and a bit-player at the same time, his Uncle Panchito's long-time comic partner Dolphy, the king of Philippine Comedy, discovered Babalu's talent as a comedian, however, it was Director Ading Fernando who gave him his stage name "Babalu" in reference to his chin, which eventually led him to be given a featured role on the Philippines' leading comedy-variety show Buhay Artista in the 1970s. Following a brief career stagnation in the 1980s, He eventually managed to stage a great comeback in the 1990s, appearing as mainstays in films and television which includes the shows Home Along Da Riles and Oki Doki Doc. He also gained and experienced further popularity during this time because of his comedy partnership with comedian Redford White, with whom he had a string of successful films. His life story was featured on the television show Maalaala Mo Kaya on the episode entitled, "Imahe ng Birhen" on July 3, 2003 where he was portrayed by Paolo Contis and Tirso Cruz III.

== Filmography ==
=== Film ===
Year	Title	Role	Notes
1962	Lab na Lab Kita	(Super Wonder Margarine) Seller	Cameo
1962	The Big Broadcast	Audience Member	Uncredited
1965	Genghis Bond: Agent 1-2-3	Babalu	
1966	Napoleon Doble and the Sexy Six		
1966	Mariang Kondesa		
1966	Wow na Wow!!		
1967	Ayaw Ni Mayor		Uncredited
1967	Pitong Zapata		
1968	Ang Banal, Ang Ganid, At Ang Pusakal	Berting	
1968	Eskinita 29		
1968	Buy One Take One		
1969	Banda 24		
1970	El Pinoy Matador	Babalu	
1970	Boyoyoy		
1970	Si Ponso, Si Elena At Si Boy		
1971	Toro! Tora! Toray!		
1971	Bukid Ay Basa		
1972	Ibong Adarna	Prinsipe Albano	
1972	Love Pinoy Style		
1972	Pinokyo En Little Snow White		
1973	Ako'y Paru Paro, Bulaklak Naman Ako!	Tutuboy	
1973	Captain Barbell Boom!	Petot	
1973	Drakula Goes to R.P.	Ambo	
1973	Fefita Fofonggay Viuda De Falayfay		
1974	Sarhento Fofonggay: A, ewan!	Corporal Dela Cruz	
1974	John And Marsha	Guard	Cameo
1975	Kung May Tiyaga May Nilaga		
1975	O... Anong Sarap		
1975	Romeo At Julio		
1975	Doctor, Doctor I Am Sick!		
1976	Kaming Matatapang Ang Apog	Bobby	Cameo
1976	Ngiti, Tawa At Halakhak		
1977	Omeng Satanasia	Steve	
1979	Buhay Artista Ngayon	Chito	
1980	Ang Bobo Kong Genie		
1980	Juan Tamad Jr.	Bertong Tapal	Cameo
1981	Boljak	Baba	
1981	Milyonaryong Gipit		
1981	Pamilya Antik		
1982	My Juan En Only	Ambo	
1982	My Heart Belongs to Daddy	Inmate	
1982	Cross My Heart	Ninong's Son	
1984	Teppanyaki		Uncredited
1984	Kapag Baboy ang Inutang	Pepe	
1985	The Crazy Professor	Guard	Cameo; first collaboration with Aga Muhlach
1986	The Buelta Force	Babalu Sarmiento	
1987	My Bugoy Goes to Congress		
1987	Mga Anak ni Facifica Falayfay	Chief Acosta	
1987	Binibining Tsuper-Man	Bob	
1987	Bata-Batuta	Policeman	Cameo
1987	Suicide Pakners	Policeman	Cameo
1988	Enteng the Dragon		Cameo
1988	Bakit Kinagat ni Adan ang Mansanas ni Eba?	Doctor	Cameo, The Voice has been Overdubbed.
1989	Balbakwa	Floro	
1989	My Darling Domestik	Chino	
1990	Og Must Be Crazy	Et	
1991	John en Marsha Ngayon '91	Delivery Man	Cameo
1993	Ang Boyfriend Kong Gamol	Mang Pandong	
1993	Ano Ba 'Yan 2	Policeman	
1993	Home Along Da Riles Da Movie	Sgt. Babalu Dizon	
1993	Mama's Boys (Mga Praning-ning)	Manong (Landlord)	
1994	Once Upon a Time in Manila	Carnapper	Cameo
1994	Hataw Tatay Hataw	Gilbert	
1994	Hindi Pa Tapos Ang Labada Darling	Andres	
1994	O-Ha! Ako Pa?	Raul Malino/Chief	
1994	Greggy en' Boogie: Sakyan Mo Na Lang, Anna	Boogie	
1994	Si Ayala At Si Zobel	Soriano	
1995	Wanted: Perfect Father	Bobby	
1995	Boy! Gising!	Totoy Buan	
1995	Home Sic Home	Robin	
1995	Father & Son	Clinton	
1996	Oki Doki Doc: The Movie	Mang Berto	
1996	Da Best in Da West 2: Da Western Pulis Istori	Col. Macanto	
1996	Aring King King: Ang Bodyguard Kong Sexy	Fulgoso	
1997	I Do? I Die! (D'yos Ko Day!)	Domeng	
1997	Ang Pinakamahabang Baba sa Balat ng Lupa	Bryan	
1997	Home Along Da Riles Part 2	Richy	
1998	Haba-Baba-Doo, Puti-Puti-Poo	Domeng / Rosanna Magdalena	
1998	Tong Tatlong Tatay Kong Pakitong-kitong	Bobby	
1998	Tataynic	Mr. Balboa	Final film appearance

=== Television ===
Year	Title	Role
1992–1998	Home Along da Riles	Capt. Babalu (1992–1993 as guest); Mang Ritchie (1994–1998 as main cast)
1993	Okay Ka, Fairy Ko!	Uncle Bob (as guest)
1993–1998	Oki Doki Doc	Papsie / Mang Berto, the protagonist's landlord

== Health problems and death ==
Babalu was warned of his health condition in March 1998 but kept his health problems a secret from his co-stars, particularly from Aga Muhlach and the others in the weekly TV shows Oki Doki Doc and Home Along Da Riles, wherein he was a regular cast.

Babalu's last two movies were Tataynic with Dolphy and Tong Tatlong Tatay Kong Pakitong-kitong together with Redford White, Bonel Balingit and Serena Dalrymple. He died of liver cancer on August 27, 1998, two months after his 56th birthday, in his home in Antipolo. He was buried in Loyola Memorial Park in Parañaque. The film Tar-San is dedicated to his memory.
