= Dolphy filmography =

Rodolfo Vera Quizon Sr. OGH (July 25, 1928 – July 10, 2012), better known by his stage name Dolphy, was a Filipino comedian and actor. He is widely regarded as the country's King of Comedy for his comedic talent embodied by his long roster of works on stage, radio, television and movies.

== Film ==
=== 1940s ===
Year	Title	Role	Producer
1946	Dugo ng Bayan (I Remember Bataan)	Himself	Palaris Films

=== 1950s ===
Year	Title	Role	Producer
1950	Dolphy and Panchito		
1951	Apoy na Ginatungan	Golay	
1952	Kapag langit ang humatol		
1953	Walang Kaluluwa		
1953	Villa Barundia		
1953	Ang Mga Paslit		
1953	Sa isang sulyap mo Tita		Sampaguita Pictures
1954	Sa isang halik mo Pancho		
1954	Sabungera		
1954	Menor de edad		
1954	Maalaala mo kaya		
1954	Jack en Jill	Gloria / Gorio	Sampaguita Pictures
1954	Dalagang Ilocana		
1955	Tatay na si Bondying		
1955	Mambo dyambo		
1955	Kurdapya		
1955	Hootsy kootsy		
1955	Hindi basta basta		
1955	Despatsadora		
1955	Balisong		
1955	Artista		
1956	Vacacionista		
1956	Teresa		
1956	Pampanguena		
1956	Kulang sa pito		
1956	Gigolo		
1956	Chavacano		
1956	Boksingera daw!		
1957	Hongkong Holiday		
1957	Hahabul-habol		
1957	Bituing Marikit		
1958	Mga Reyna ng Vicks		
1958	Pulot Gata		
1958	Silveria		
1958	Mga Kuwento ni Lola Basyang	Pedro	
1959	Kalabog en Bosyo	Kalabog	
1959	Pakiusap		
1959	Isinumpa		
1959	Ipinagbili Kami ng Aming Tatay		
1959	Wedding Bells		

=== 1960s ===
Year	Title	Role	Producer
1960	Dobol Trobol		
1960	Beatnik		
1961	Operatang Sampay Bakod		
1961	Lawiswis Kawayan		
1961	Kandidatong Pulpol		
1961	Hami-hanimun		
1962	Tansan the Mighty	Tansan	
1962	Susanang daldal		
1962	Si Lucio at si Miguel		
1962	Lab na lab kita		
1962	Barilan sa baboy-kural		
1962	The Big Broadcast		
1963	Tansan vs. Tarsan	Tansan	
1963	Mga Manugang ni Drakula		
1963	Ikaw na ang mag-ako		
1963	Isinusumpa ko!		
1963	King and Queen for a Day		
1964	Babaeng Kidlat		
1964	Adre, ayos na! (ang buto-buto)		
1964	Captain Barbell	Tenteng	
1964	Sa Daigdig ng Fantasia		
1964	Show Business		
1965	Utos ni Tale hinde mababale		
1965	Kulog at kidlat		
1965	Genghis Bond: Agent 1-2-3	Agent 1-2-3	
1965	Dr. Yes	Agent 1-2-3	
1965	Dressed to Kill		
1965	Dolpinger		RR Productions
1965	Dolpinger: Agent sa lagim		RR Productions
1965	Dolpinger Meets Pantarorong		RR Productions
1965	Operasyon ni Adan		
1965	Scarface at Al Capone: Espiya sa Ginto		
1965	Keng Leon, Keng Tigre Ecu Tatakut, Keka Pa		
1966	Alias Popeye		
1966	Sungit Conference (Ng Pitong Dakila)		
1966	Pepe en Pilar	Pilar	
1966	Operation Butterball		
1966	James Batman	Batman / James Bond	
1966	Dolpong Scarface		
1966	Dolpong Istambul		
1966	Doble solo		
1966	Alyas Don Juan	Agent 1-2-3	
1966	Dr La-Way: Pare, Kwarta, Na!	Agent 1-2-3	
1966	Dressed to Kill	Agent 1-2-3	
1966	Mga Bagong Salta Sa Bahay Engkantada	Agent 1-2-3	
1966	Pambihirang dalawa (Sa combat)		
1966	Napoleon Doble and the Sexy Six		
1966	The 7 Faces of Dr Si Baso		
1966	Mga Bagong Salta sa Maynila		
1966	Dalawang kumander sa WAC		
1966	Keni Brothers		
1967	Like father, like son: Kung ano ang puno siya ang bunga		RVQ Productions
1967	Buhay Marino		
1967	Ayaw ni Mayor		
1967	Sitsiritsit alibangbang: Salaginto at salagubang		RVQ Productions
1967	Hey Boy! Hey Girl!		
1967	Together Again		Gretas Productions
1967	Shake-a-Boom! (Naghalo ang balat sa tinalupan)		Perez Bros.
1968	Utos ni mayor		GM Film Organization
1968	Tiririt ng Maya, Tiririt ng Ibon		RVQ Productions
1968	Private Ompong and the Sexy Dozen	Pvt. Ompong	RVQ Productions
1968	O Kaka, O Kaka!		Lea Productions
1968	Kaming Taga-ilog		RVQ Productions
1968	Kaming Taga-bundok		RVQ Productions
1968	Good Morning Titser		AM Productions
1968	Family Planning		RVQ Productions
1968	Dakilang Tanga		RVQ Productions
1968	Buy One Take One		RVQ Productions
1968	Buhay Bombero	Ompong	FGO Film Productions
1968	Ang Banal, Ang Ganid at Ang Pusakal	Ang Banal	RVQ Productions
1968	Arista ang Aking Asawa		Lea Productions
1969	The Graduation		RVQ Productions
1969	Ang Sakristan		RVQ Productions
1969	Kangkarot		RVQ Productions
1969	Sampung Labuyo	Pedro Bayugo	
1969	Pag-ibig Masdan ang Ginawa Mo		RVQ Productions
1969	Facifica Falayfay	Facifica Falayfay	RVQ Productions
1969	Dolpe de Gulat		Deegar Cinema
1969	Adolphong Hitler	Adolphong Hitler	
1969	Mekeni's Gold	Gregory Pek-wa	FGO Film Production

=== 1970s ===
Year	Title	Role	Producer
1970	Tayo's mag-up, up and away		RVQ Productions
1970	El Pinoy Matador		Premiere Productions
1970	Boyoyoy		RVQ Productions
1971	Tulak ng Bibig, Kabig ng Dibdib		RVQ Productions
1972	Love Pinoy Style		RVQ Productions Rodzon Film Organization
1972	Kitang-kita ang Ebidensya (The evidence sticks out)		Royal Productions
1972	Itik-Itik		Lea Productions
1973	Fefita Fofonggay viuda de Falayfay	Fefita Fofongay	RVQ Productions
1973	Fung Ku		RVQ Productions
1973	Captain Barbell Boom!	Tingting / Captain Barbell	RVQ Productions
1973	Ang Hiwaga ng Ibong Adarna	Prinsipe Adolfo	Roda Film Productions
1973	Ako'y Paru-paro, Bulaklak naman Ako	Parolito	Roda Film Productions
1974	Sarhento Fofongay: A, ewan!	Kikoy Fofongay	RVQ Productions
1974	Huli Huli Yan	Olympio 'Ompong' Rocha	Lea Productions
1974	My Funny Valentine	Banjo	RVQ Productions
1974	Bornebol: Special Agent	Bornebol Batungbakal	RVQ Productions
1974	Biyenan Ko ang Aking Anak	Anacleto "Clint" Westwood Cruz, Sr.	RVQ Productions
1974	Happy Days Are Here Again		Sampaguita Pictures; LVN Pictures; Premiere Productions
1975	John & Marsha sa Amerika (Part Two)	John H. Purúntong	RVQ Productions
1975	Jack and Jill and John	Jack & John	RVQ Productions
1975	Kaming Matatapang ang Apog	Urbano	RVQ Productions
1975	The Goodfather		RVQ Productions
1976	Taho-ichi		GPS Film Production
1976	Kisame Street		RVQ Productions
1977	War Kami ng Misis Ko		RVQ Productions
1977	Omeng Satanasia	Omeng / Satanasia / Gregory / Angelito	RVQ Productions
1977	Kapten Batuten en His Super Batuta (Captain Batuten and his Super Baton)	Kapten Batuten	Wonderland Productions
1977	John en Marsha '77	John H. Purúntong	RVQ Productions
1978	Mokong	Mokong	RVQ Productions
1978	Facundo Alitaftaf	Facundo Alitaftaf	Regal Films
1978	Ang Tatay Kong Nanay (My Father Who Is My Mother)	Dioscoro Derecho/Coring	Lotus Films
1978	Mga Mata ni Angelitang Ina (Angelita's Eyes)	Tasyo da Mangtataho	Larry Santiago Productions
1978	Jack n' Jill of the Third Kind		RVQ Productions; Lion Dragon Films
1979	Bugoy	Bugoy	Hemisphere Pictures
1979	Darna, Kuno?	Darna	Regal Films
1979	Dancing Master	Johnny	RVQ Productions
1979	Max en Jess	Max	Four N Films
1979	Buhay artista ngayon (The life of an artist today)		

=== 1980s ===
Year	Title	Role	Producer
1980	John en Marsha '80	John H. Purúntong	RVQ Productions
1980	Superhand	Johnny	RVQ Productions
1980	Dolphy's Angels	Dolphy Angeles	RVQ Productions
1980	The Quick Brown Fox Jumps Over the Lazy Pig		RVQ Productions
1980	Stariray		RVQ Productions
1981	Da Best in Da West		RVQ Productions
1981	Titser's Pet		RVQ Productions
1982	My Heart Belongs to Daddy		RVQ Productions
1982	Good Morning, Professor		RVQ Productions
1982	Mga Kanyon ni Mang Simeon (Simeon's Cannons)		RVQ Productions
1982	Dancing Master 2: Macao Connection	Johnny	RVQ Productions
1982	Nang Umibig ang Mga Gurang	Dolpo	Summa Films
1982	My Juan en Only	Juan	J. Zubiri Productions Vision Exponents
1983	Teng, Teng de Sarapen		
1983	Da Best of John & Marsha	John H. Purúntong	RVQ Productions
1983	Daddy Knows Best		RVQ Productions
1983	Always in My Heart	Angelo	Rodessa Films International
1984	Da Best of John & Marsha 2	John H. Purúntong	RVQ Productions
1984	Daddy's Little Darlings		Regal Films
1984	Nang Maghalo ang Balat sa Tinalupan	Rudolph	RVQ Productions
1985	Kalabog en Bosyo Strike Again	Kalabog	Cinema 1635
1985	John en Marsha '85 sa Probinsya	John H. Purúntong	RVQ Productions
1985	Goatbuster: Sa Templo ni Dune	Baldo/Bogart	Lea Productions
1985	The Crazy Professor	Prof. Einstein	RVQ Productions
1986	John en Marsha '86 T. N. T. sa Amerika	John H. Purúntong	RVQ Productions
1986	Balimbing (Mga Taong Hunyango)		RVQ Productions
1986	Home Sweet Home		Baby Pascual Films And Associates
1987	Once Upon a Time	Puga	Regal Films
1987	Bata-Batuta		RVQ Productions
1987	My Bugoy Goes to Congress	Bugoy	
1987	Mga Anak ni Facifica Falayfay	Facifica Falayfay	RVQ Productions
1987	Black Magic	Demi	Seiko Films
1987	Action Is Not Missing		Davian International Ltd.
1988	Haw Haw De Karabaw	Sebio/Nardong Putik	Lea Productions
1988	Enteng the Dragon	Enteng	RVQ Productions
1988	Ompong Galapong: May Ulo, Walang Tapon	Rodolfo "Ompong" Olimpio	Horizon Films
1988	Bakit Kinagat ni Adan ang Mansanas ni Eba?	Ambo	Urban Films
1989	Balbakwa (The Invisible Man)	Balbakwa	Solar Films
1989	Pulis, Pulis sa Ilalim ng Tulay	Agapito "Pitong" Dimasuhulan	Regal Films
1989	My Darling Domestic (Greyt Eskeyp)		RVQ Productions

=== 1990s ===
Year	Title	Role	Producer
1990	Atorni Agaton: Abogadong de Kampanilya	Atorni Agaton	
1990	Dino Dinero	Dino	Seiko Films
1990	Og Must Be Crazy	Og	RVQ Productions
1990	Espadang Patpat (Stick Swords)	Pidol	AMS Productions (I), Airoh Media Services
1991	John en Marsha ngayon '91	John H. Purúntong	RVQ Productions
1992	Buddy en Sol (Sine ito)	Foreman	
1993	Home Along da Riles The Movie	Kevin Kósme	Star Cinema
1994	Abrakadabra	Aladding/Ding	Moviestars Productions
1994	Hataw Tatay Hataw	Marlon	Regal Films
1994	Wanted: Perfect Father	Roy Dalamhati/Mommy Cora	Star Cinema
1995	Home Sic Home	Berto	Star Cinema
1995	Father & Son	Johnny Pagudpud	RVQ Productions
1996	Da Best in da West 2: Da Western Pulis Stori	Sgt. John Paul Quezada	Regal Films
1996	Aringkingking	Mario "Maroy" Zobel	Premiere Entertainment Productions
1997	Home Along da Riles The Movie 2	Kevin Kósme	Star Cinema
1998	Tataynic	Nicardo "Tatay Nic" De Carpio	RVQ Productions

=== 2000s ===
Year	Title	Role	Producer
2000	Daddy O, Baby O!	Mario	Star Cinema
2000	Markova: Comfort Gay	Walter Dempster Jr./Walterina Markova	RVQ Productions
2002	Home Alone da Riber	Upoy	RVQ Productions
2008	Dobol Trobol: Lets Get Redi 2 Rambol!	Macario "Mac"	APT Entertainment, RVQ Productions, M-Zet Productions
2009	Nobody, Nobody But... Juan	Juan	RVQ Productions, Kaizz Ventures Inc. and Joe Aldeguer Productions

=== 2010s ===
Year	Title	Role	Producer	Notes
2010	Rosario	Hesus (Special Participation)	CineMabuhay	
2010	Father Jejemon	Fr. Jeremiah Jerome Montes	RVQ Productions Inc.	Last role
2013	The Search for Weng Weng	Interviewee	Death Rides A Red Horse	Documentary interview released posthumously

== Television ==
Year	Title	Role	Network	Notes
	Dance-O-Rama		ABC	
	Tang-tarantang		ABS-CBN	
1964–1972	Buhay Artista		ABS-CBN	
	Lucky Stars		RPN	
1973–1990	John en Marsha	John Puruntong	RPN	
1987	Captain Barbell	Captain Barbell	RPN	Voice role.
1989	Gabi ni Dolphy	Himself	RPN	
	Idol si Pidol	Himself	ABC	
1993	Puruntong	John Puruntong	RPN	
	GMA Telesine Specials	Guest	GMA	
1992–2003	Home Along Da Riles	Mang Kevin Kósme	ABS-CBN	
	Maalaala Mo Kaya	Mang Luis	ABS-CBN	
2003–2005	Home Along Da Airport	Mang Kevin Kósme	ABS-CBN	
2005–2006	Quizon Avenue	Himself	ABS-CBN	
2006–2007	John en Shirley	John Puruntong	ABS-CBN	
2009–2010	May Bukas Pa	Pilo	ABS-CBN	
2010–2012	Pidol's Wonderland	Mang Pidol	TV5	Last TV appearance Released 9 days after his death. Nominated – Outstanding Performance by an Actor in a Single Comedy/Telemovie Program in the 2012 Golden Screen TV Awards
