= List of awards and nominations received by Dolphy =

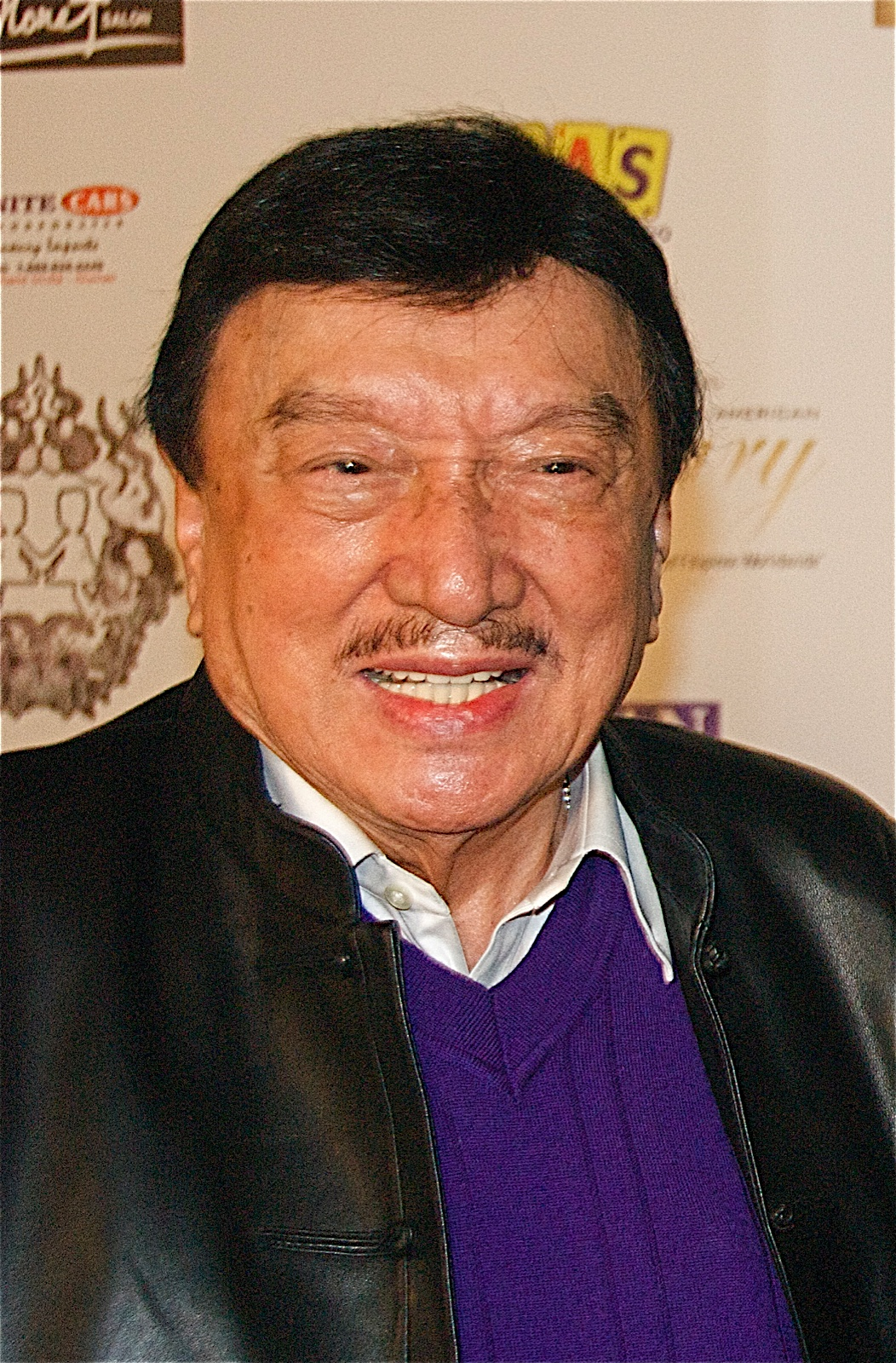
Dolphy in 2008

Dolphy is a Filipino actor and comedian who has received awards and nominations for his work in film and television. He began his career as a vaudevillian and worked on radio from mid to late 1940s. He branched into acting on screen in the early 1950s, where he played minor roles until his breakthrough in the comedy film Jack en Jill (1954). Dolphy received his first FAMAS Award for Best Actor nomination for his role in Kung Ano ang Puno Siya ang Bunga (1967) and later received two more consecutively for his performances in Artista ang Aking Asawa (1968) and Pag-ibig Masdan ang Ginawa Mo (1969).

For his portrayal of an ageing scientist in the fantasy comedy Omeng Satanasia (1977), he earned his first FAMAS Award for Best Actor. Dolphy was named Box Office King four times from 1970s to 1980s and received four Star Award for Best Comedy Actor; one for John en Marsha, and three for Home Along Da Riles. In 1990, he played a mentally challenged outcast in the action comedy Espadang Patpat, for which he was awarded the Metro Manila Film Festival Award for Best Actor. For his portrayal of an abused gay man during the Japanese occupation in the coming-of-age drama Markova: Comfort Gay (2000), he was awarded both Best Actor and Best Actress at the Brussels International Film Festival. He continued to earn accolades in his later years. His special participation in the period drama Rosario (2010) earned him a Luna Award for Best Supporting Actor. For his final film role where he played an unconventional priest in the comedy drama Father Jejemon (2010), he was awarded Best Actor at Luna Awards and Metro Manila Film Festival.

Throughout his career that spanned over six decades, Dolphy has received a number of honorary accolades. He was conferred the Grand Collar of the Order of the Golden Heart in 2010 for his philanthropic works and contributions to Philippine entertainment. In 1999, the Cultural Center of the Philippines included him on their list of the 100 Filipinos who have contributed to building the nation through art and culture in the 20th century. The Luna Awards in 1992, Gawad Urian in 1998 and Metro Manila Film Festival in 2009 honored him the Lifetime Achievement Award.

== State honors ==
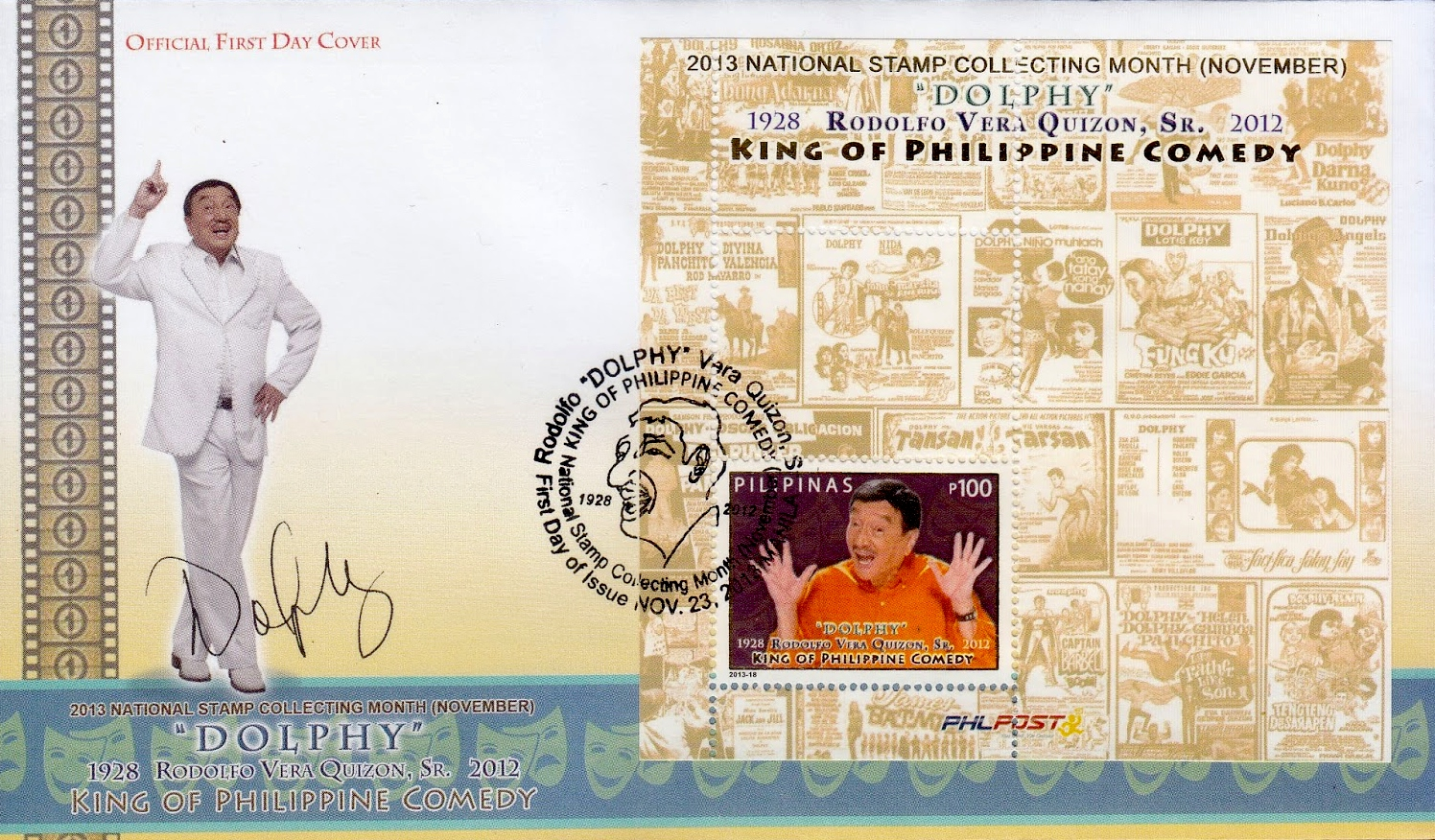
Dolphy, as depicted in a PhilPost commemorative post stamp

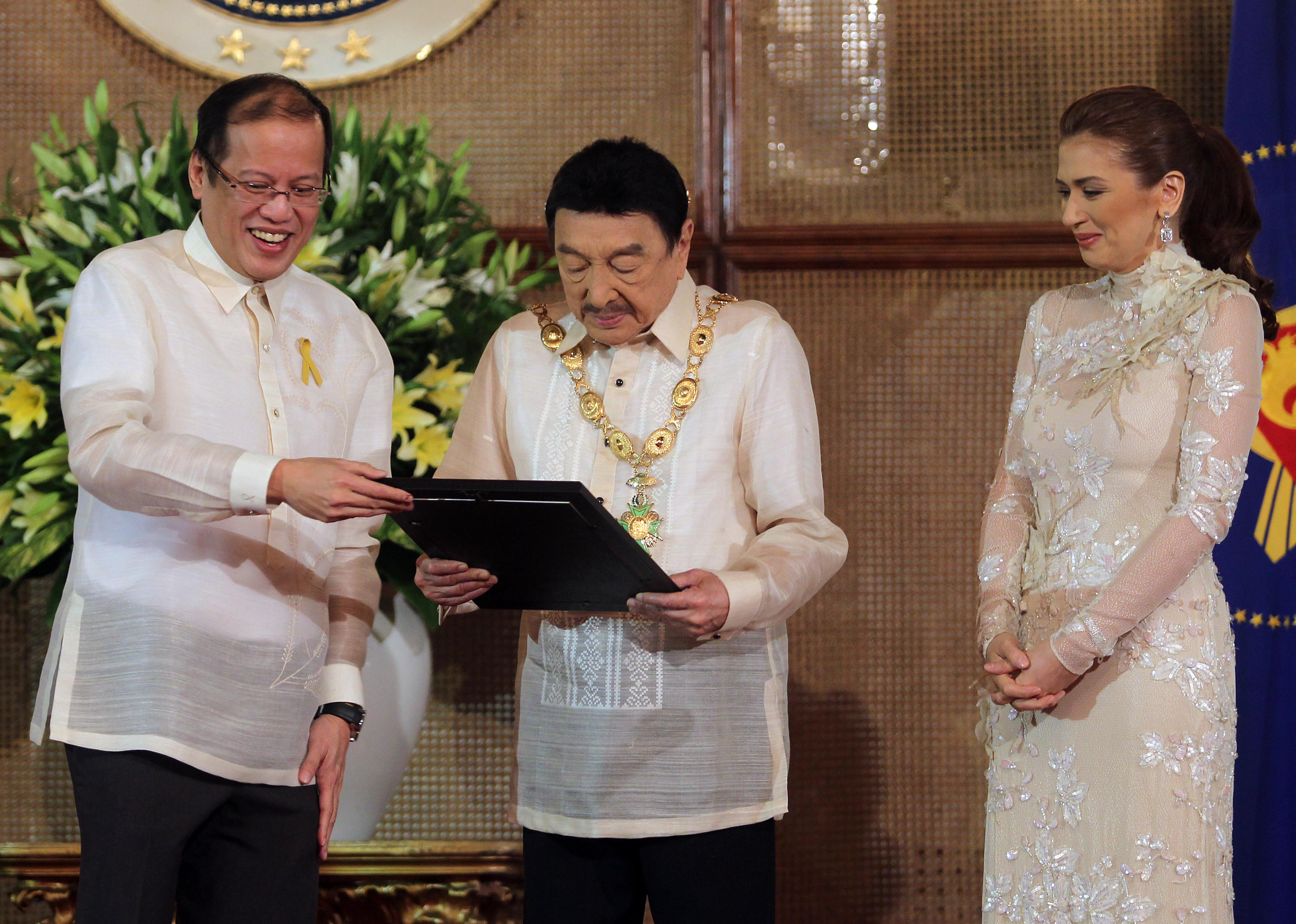
President of the Philippines Benigno Aquino III presents Dolphy the Grand Collar of the Order of the Golden Heart at Malacañang Palace, 2010

Awards and nominations received by Dolphy
Award (Note: Awards, festivals, honors and other miscellaneous organizations are listed in alphabetical order.)	Year (Note: Indicates the year of ceremony. Each year is linked to the article about the awards held that year, wherever possible.)	Category	Result	Ref.
Cultural Center of the Philippines	2013	Gawad CCP Para sa Sining	Honored	
Republic of the Philippines	2010	Order of the Golden Heart	Honored	

== Accolades ==
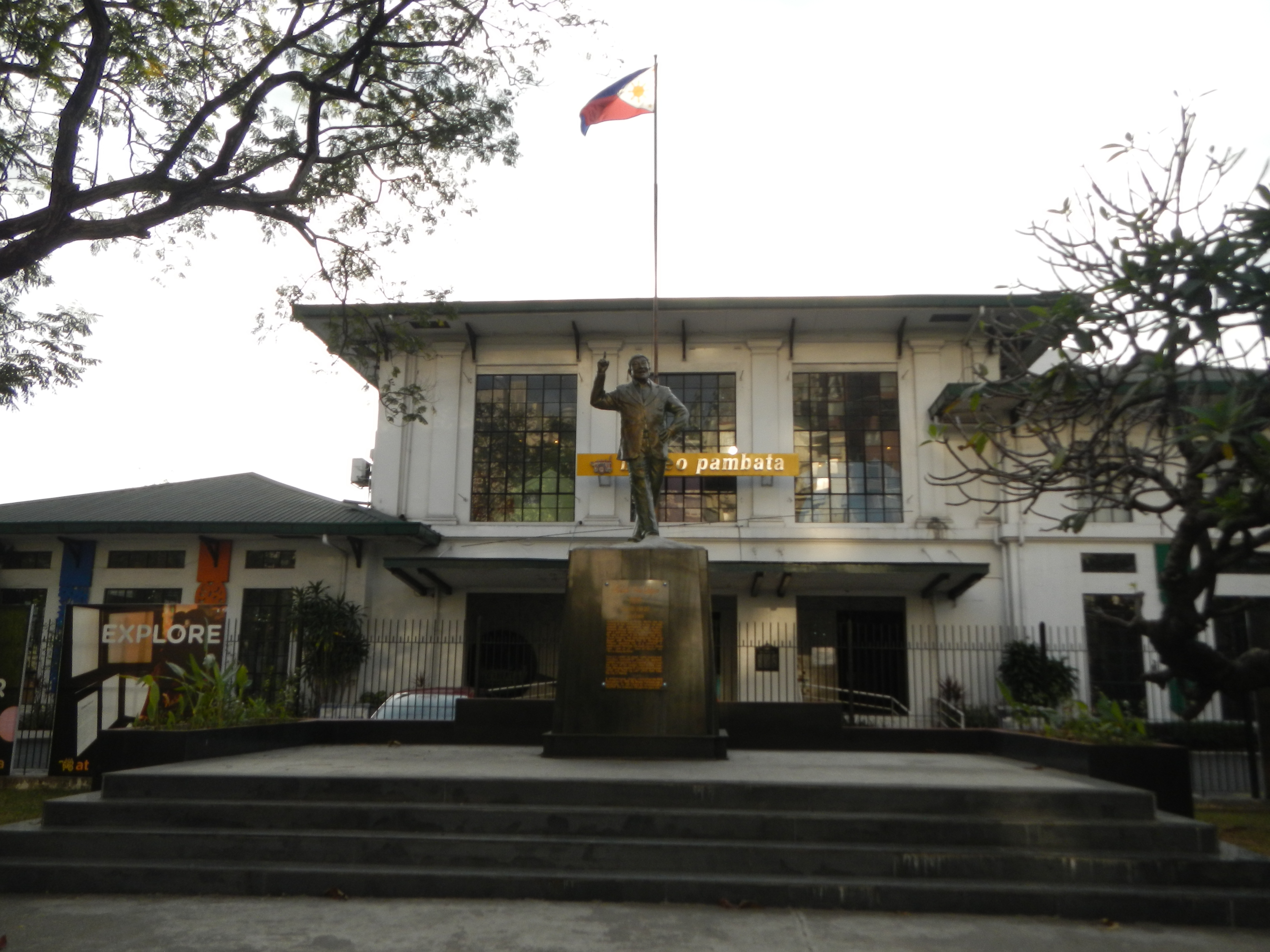
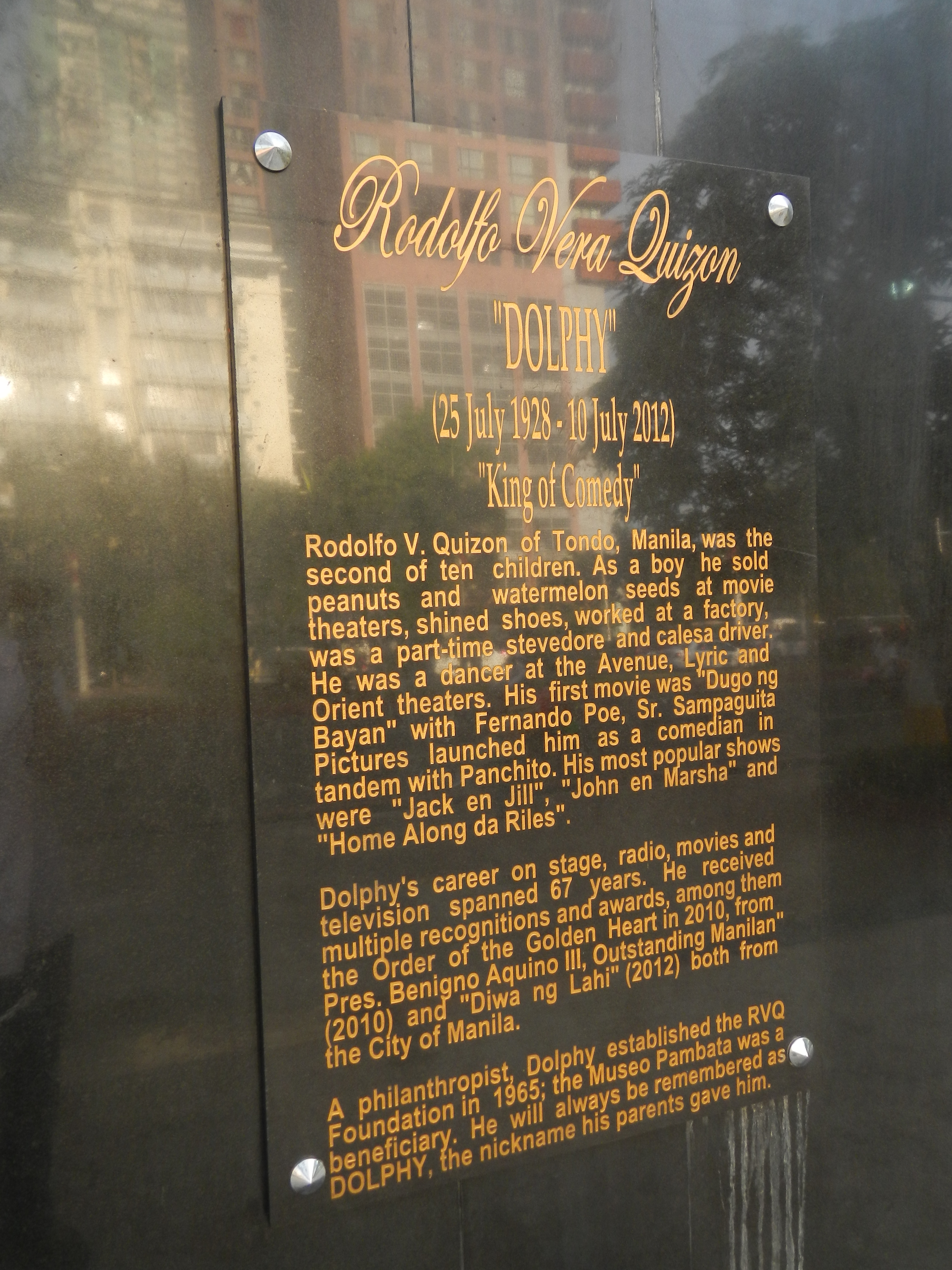
A 7-ft bronze Dolphy monument located in front of Museo Pambata along Roxas Boulevard.

Awards and nominations received by Dolphy
Award	Year	Nominated work	Category	Result	Ref.
Box Office Entertainment Awards	1971	Dolphy	Box Office King	Won	
Box Office Entertainment Awards	1975	Dolphy	Box Office King	Won	
Box Office Entertainment Awards	1980	Dolphy	Box Office King	Won	
Box Office Entertainment Awards	1981	Dolphy	Box Office King	Won	
Box Office Entertainment Awards	1989	Dolphy	All-time Favorite Actor	Won	
Box Office Entertainment Awards	2009	Dobol Trobol: Lets Get Redi 2 Rambol!	Comedy Box Office King	Won	
Brussels International Film Festival	2001	Markova: Comfort Gay	Best Actor	Won	
Cinemanila International Film Festival	2010	Dolphy	Lifetime Achievement Award	Won	
City Government of Manila	1994	Dolphy	Outstanding Manilan Award for Entertainment	Won	
City Government of Manila	2007	Dolphy	Patnubay ng Sining at Kalinangan Award	Won	
City Government of Manila	2012	Dolphy	Diwa ng Lahi	Won	
FAMAS Awards	1968	Kung Ano ang Puno Siya ang Bunga	Best Actor	Nominated	
FAMAS Awards	1969	Arista ang Aking Asawa	Best Actor	Nominated	
FAMAS Awards	1970	Pag-ibig Masdan ang Ginawa Mo	Best Actor	Nominated	
FAMAS Awards	1975	John & Marsha	Best Actor	Nominated	
FAMAS Awards	1978	Omeng Satanasia	Best Actor	Won	
FAMAS Awards	1979	Ang Tatay kong Nanay	Best Actor	Nominated	
FAMAS Awards	1982	Titser's Pet	Best Actor	Nominated	
FAMAS Awards	1983	My Heart Belongs to Daddy	Best Actor	Nominated	
FAMAS Awards	1988	Once Upon a Time	Best Actor	Nominated	
FAMAS Awards	1996	Father & Son	Best Actor	Nominated	
FAMAS Awards	2001	Markova: Comfort Gay	Best Actor	Nominated	
FAMAS Awards	2002	Dolphy	Star of FAMAS from Then to Now Award	Won	
FAMAS Awards	2002	Dolphy	Lou Salvador Sr. Memorial Award	Won	
FAMAS Awards	2005	Dolphy	Huwarang Bituin Award	Won	
FAMAS Awards	2010	Dolphy	Exemplary Achievement Award	Won	
Gawad Urian	1979	Ang Tatay kong Nanay	Best Actor	Nominated	
Gawad Urian	1998	Dolphy	Lifetime Achievement Award	Won	
Gawad Urian	2001	Markova: Comfort Gay	Best Actor	Nominated	
Golden Screen Awards	2004	Dolphy	Lifetime Achievement Award	Won	
Golden Screen Awards	2011	Rosario	Best Performance by an Actor in a Supporting Role (Drama, Musical or Comedy)	Nominated	
Golden Screen Awards	2011	Dolphy	Movie Icons of our Time	Won	
Luna Awards	1992	Dolphy	Lifetime Achievement Award	Won	
Luna Awards	2011	Father Jejemon	Best Actor	Won	
Luna Awards	2011	Rosario	Best Supporting Actor	Nominated	
Luna Awards	2012	Dolphy	Golden Reel Award	Won	
Manila Film Festival	1974	John and Marsha	Best Actor	Won	
Manila Film Festival	1997	Dolphy	Natatanging Gawad ng MFF	Won	
Metro Manila Film Festival	1990	Espadang Patpat	Best Actor	Won	
Metro Manila Film Festival	1994	Wanted: Perfect Father	Best Actor	Nominated	
Metro Manila Film Festival	2009	Dolphy	Lifetime Achievement Award	Won	
Metro Manila Film Festival	2010	Father Jejemon	Best Actor	Won	
Metro Manila Film Festival	2010	Rosario	Best Supporting Actor	Won	
Mowelfund	2004	Dolphy	Ani Award	Won	
Star Awards for Movies	1994	Dolphy	Ulirang Artista Award	Won	
Star Awards for Television	1987	John en Marsha	Best Comedy Actor	Won	
Star Awards for Television	1988	John en Marsha	Best Comedy Actor	Nominated	
Star Awards for Television	1990	John en Marsha	Best Comedy Actor	Nominated	
Star Awards for Television	1993	Home Along Da Riles	Best Comedy Actor	Won	
Star Awards for Television	1994	Home Along Da Riles	Best Comedy Actor	Won	
Star Awards for Television	1995	Home Along Da Riles	Best Comedy Actor	Won	
Star Awards for Television	1995	Dolphy	Lifetime Achievement Award	Won	
Star Awards for Television	2006	Quizon Avenue	Best Comedy Actor	Nominated	
Star Awards for Television	2008	Maalaala Mo Kaya (Episode: "Singsing")	Best Single Performance by an Actor	Nominated	
Young Critics Circle	2001	Markova: Comfort Gay	Best Performance	Nominated	
