= John en Marsha Ngayon '91 =

- Official movie poster
- Directed by: Luciano B. Carlos
- Screenplay by: Luciano B. Carlos; Jose Javier Reyes
- Story by: Luciano B. Carlos; Roy Vera Cruz
- Produced by: Rodolfo Vera Quizon
- Starring: Dolphy; Nida Blanca; Maricel Soriano
- Cinematography: Amado de Guzman
- Music by: Mon del Rosario
- Distributed by: RVQ Productions
- Release date: January 16, 1991
- Running time: 119 minutes
- Country: Philippines
- Language: Filipino

John en Marsha Ngayon '91 is a Philippine film based on the television series John en Marsha.

== Plot ==
The story is set in 1991 where John and Marsha, still impoverished, manage to send Shirley to college where she takes up Nursing. John gets employed by a rich man as a babysitter for his bratty grandson. Regardless of how harshly he is treated by his employers, John takes it as an opportunity to earn more money to secure Shirley's future. But while he and Marsha thought that Shirley was doing well in college, she ends up having a boyfriend named Edwin who accompanies her in cutting classes.

Shirley's series of secret rendezvous with Edwin results with her getting pregnant. But unknown to her, Edwin has accidentally met her father John a lot of times, with John ending up on the wrong side of the fence. So when she introduced Edwin to her parents, John ends up disapproving the relationship. Moreover, he also drives Shirley out of his house after finding out she got pregnant with Edwin's child.

Soon after John felt guilty of what he had done. To make amends, he uses up his savings from his job to buy the basic needs of Edwin and Shirley's baby and furnish the new family's house while hiding his identity out of shame for what he did. Eventually, Shirley finds out the good deed her father has done and buries the hatchet with the rest of the family.

== Cast ==
- Dolphy as John Puruntong
- Nida Blanca as Marsha Puruntong
- Maricel Soriano as Shirley Puruntong
- Rolly Quizon as Rolly Puruntong
- Dely Atay-atayan as Doña Delilah Jones
- Evelyn Bontogon-Guerrero as Matutina
- Jaime Garchitorena as Edwin De Regan
- Atong Redillas as John-John Puruntong
- LA Lopez as JV
- Babalu as Delivery Boy
- Nicole Quizon as Nicole Puruntong

== Related media ==
Television series

- John en Marsha (1973)

Films

- John and Marsha (1974)
- John and Marsha sa Amerika (1975)
- John and Marsha '77 (1977)
- John & Marsha '80 (1980)
- Da Best of John & Marsha (1984)
- John en Marsha '85 (1985)
