= Matutina (actress) =

Filipino actress (1946–2025)

- Born: Evelyn Bontogon; July 10, 1946
- Died: February 14, 2025 (aged 78)
- Occupations: Actress; comedienne
- Years active: 1970s–2024

Evelyn Bontogon-Guerrero (July 10, 1946 – February 14, 2025), known professionally as Matutina, was a Filipino actress.

== Early life ==
Matutina was born on July 10, 1946 and was the eldest of seven siblings.

== Career ==
Guerrero began her career as a radio personality. She was noted for being able to do voice acting for various actors – "man, woman, boy, girl, and the elderly". Her name Matutina came from a character she portrayed in a soap brand's radio commercial. She did radio dramas including Lundagin Mo, Beybeh!.

She was scouted by director Ading Fernando who cast her without auditioning for his sitcom project. This project turned out to be John en Marsha, starring Dolphy and Nida Blanca as the titular husband-and-wife and aired on RPN-9 from 1973 to 1990, with a short hiatus from 1978 to 1980, where she played Matutina, the squeaky-voiced maid and sidekick of Donya Delilah G. Jones (Dely Atay-atayan). Her character became her screen name because she wanted to differentiate the voice she used in the sitcom from her radio projects.

After the sitcom ended in 1990, though reprised her role in John en Shirley, she continued her career in radio and became a dubbing director for radio dramas and later, East Asian dramas and anime shows that were shown on ABS-CBN and its subsidiaries. She provided the voice of Principal Urara in the 2007 Filipino redub of the 1994-95 magical girl anime Akazukin Chacha.

== Politics ==
Matutina served as a Councilor of Barangay Pag-asa, Quezon City from 2007 to 2010.

== Illness and death ==
Matutina died due to acute respiratory failure on February 14, 2025, at the age of 78. She had also suffered various health problems; including chronic kidney disease which she dealt with by undergoing dialysis for nine years, and osteoporosis which rendered her unable to walk for at least the last five months of her life.

== Filmography ==
=== Television ===
- John en Marsha as herself (character)
- Dancing Master 2
- At Your Service, Matutina
- Kapag Baboy ang Inutang
- Mga Kanyeon ni Mang Simeon
- Hiwalay Kung Hiwalay
- Super Inggo as Lola Impa

=== Film ===
- Home Sic Home (1995) as Hysterical Passenger
- She's Dating the Gangster (2014) as Nana Buding
