= Andoy Balunbalunan =

Filipino actor

- Born: Alejandro Villegas; 1909
- Died: 1944 (aged 34–35)
- Occupations: Stage Actor; film actor; singer; radio personality; radio producer; comedian
- Known for: The other half of the Atay-atayan—Balun-balunan tandem
- Spouse: Dely Atay-atayan (m. 1934)
- Children: 1 (Alfonso)

Andoy Balunbalunan (Note: Sometimes spelled as Andoy Balun-balunan.) (born Alejandro Villegas; 1909–1944) was a Filipino theater and film actor, radio broadcaster, producer, singer, and comedian. As an actor before World War II, he appeared in the bodabil circuit and other stage plays. He was best known as the other half of the Atay-atayan—Balun-balunan comic duo; Dely Atay-atayan being the other half, whom he eventually married.

As a radio personality, his blocktimer radio program with Dely was a big hit, and they pioneered singing on radio commercials. He also produced several radio shows, starred in films, and recorded songs.

== Career ==
=== Early years as a stage actor ===
Andoy got an unusual screen name, which is a typical practice in Philippine showbiz when naming comedians. Balun-balunan is a Tagalog term for "chicken gizzard." He married his bodabil partner Dely Atay-atayan (born Adelaida Fernando), a comedian bearing an odd screen name also. Atay-atayan refers to "chicken liver." Since the duo's name has to do with giblets, particularly the Filipino dish atay-balunbalunan (food pairing of chicken liver and chicken gizzard), their theme song is entitled "Awit ng Manok" (Song of the Chicken).

The Atay-atayan—Balun-balunan comic duo had been doing stage comedy and dancing in the early 1930s. Aside from performing in bodabil, they went to fiestas and functions as performers. One of the notable events that they were invited to perform was the Binibining Liwayway, a beauty contest conducted by Liwayway magazine. Dely's brother, film director Ading Fernando, occasionally goes with the duo. They also performed at the Palace Theatre in Santa Cruz, Manila as members of the Radio Variety Revue Company, which was assembled with the duo, Chichay, and others. When Chichay joined the duo, she participated in their skit as their daughter.

=== Radio career ===
When they transitioned from stage to radio, they started to use their screen names Atay-atayan, and Balunbalunan on KZIB, the second radio station to broadcast in the Philippines. Their tandem reflected the United States standard on radio comedy where comical partners like Amos and Andy, Abbott and Costello, and George Burns and Gracie Allen were the norm during their time. Andoy and Dely were so popular that by 1940, at the peak of the demand for radio, Filipinos were purchasing radio sets to just listen to Andoy and Dely's radio show. During those times, they got the largest amount of income as radio broadcasters due to the popularity of their blocktimer programs. They also did singing in radio commercials, notably, the commercials for Kiko Baterya and Alviz Tailoring. Radio veterans credited the duo for initiating this type of commercial. They also have a Saturday night show at KZRF that included Chichay. Dely Magpayo attributed Andoy for setting her radio career in motion when she joined them. Andoy let Magpayo read commercial scripts, and do the introduction for musical presentations.

On 21 January 1940, following the Santo Niño feast in Tondo, Manila. Andoy became a host of a song and poetry contest on KZIB sponsored by a local drug store. He eventually produced other blocktimer radio programs, such as the San Miguel Brewery Hour and the variety show University of the Air utilizing English and Tagalog. In addition, he also produced a radio drama in Tagalog.

=== Film and recording career ===
The duo crossed over to film and starred in several such as the drama films Lakambini (1938), Nag-iisang Sangla (1940), and Libingang Bakal (1940). They also became recording artists, and the famous ones were "Cadete" and "Alila". The novelty song "Cadete" (a Tagalog word for "cadet") employs comic banter that mentioned the Second Sino-Japanese War. The song "Alila" (a Tagalog word for "servant" or "slave") serves as a metaphor for the American colonization of the Philippines. "Alila" starts with humorous exchanges between the duo, and it finishes with a kundiman by Dely.

=== Inactivity and death ===
Due to the Japanese occupation of the Philippines, the duo's reign of the airwaves ended. Andoy rejected joining the Japanese and avoided performing as an artist. According to Dely, Andoy became weak and frustrated because of this. He died in 1944 before the Second World War ended because he was irritated with the Japanese.

== Personal life ==
Andoy was born in 1909, and married Dely Atay-atayan in 1934. They had a son named Alfonso who became a dancer. Alfonso had five children, and his three daughters became actresses, one of which is Ann Villegas who was active during the 1970s. One of Alfonso's daughters, Amor, married Dolphy's son, Manuel Quizon. Actor Manuel Villegas Quizon II, popularly known as Boy2 Quizon, is Amor and Manuel's son, which makes Boy2 the great-grandson of Andoy and Dely.

The life story of Dely Atay-atayan was dramatized in one of the episodes of Maalaala Mo Kaya in 2004. Manilyn Reynes (as the young version) and Nanette Inventor (as the adult version) played Dely while Dominic Ochoa played Andoy.

== Filmography ==
- 1938 - Lakambini
- 1940 - Nag-iisang Sangla
- 1940 - Libingang Bakal
