= Pierre Tritz =

Jesuit priest

The Reverend Father Pierre Tritz SJ GCGH
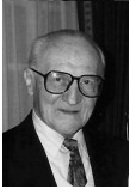
- Born: 19 September 1914; Heckling-les-Bouzonville, Moselle, France
- Died: 10 September 2016 (aged 101); Manila, Philippines
- Citizenship: France (1914-1974); Philippines(1974-2016)
- Education: Philosophy; Psychology; Education sciences
- Awards: Prix Raoul_Follereau (1983); Melvin Jones Fellowship Lions_Clubs International (1992); Aurora Aragon Quezon Peace Awards (1993); Order of the Golden Heart Philippines (1993); Chevalier de l'Ordre national du Mérite (1993; Albert Schweitzer Prize for Humanitarianism (1993); Apolinario Mabini Awards (1993) Officier de la Légion d'honneur; (1996) Prix Chabot-Didon (1998); Order of Merit of the Federal Republic of Germany (2004)

Pierre Tritz, GCGH ([pjɛʁ tʁits]), born on 19 September 1914 in Heckling-les-Bouzonville, Moselle, France, and died on 10 September 2016 in Manila in the Philippines, was a French Jesuit Priest. It was in 1926, while visiting a missionary exhibition with his parents that young Pierre discovered in faith a vocation as a priest and as an adventurous missionary.

In 1927, he left his native Lorraine and in 1933 joined the Novitiate of the Jesuits in Florennes in Belgium. In 1936, he moved to China and met a renowned scientist, Father Pierre Teilhard de Chardin whom he would frequent for ten years. Father Tritz teaches at Tientsin and studies philosophy and then theology in the Zikawei district of Shanghai before being ordained a priest there in 1944. It is in 1948 that he was forced to return to France after the communist revolution and the victory of Mao.

From 1950, he settled permanently in Manila in the Philippines, initially to teach there. He obtained the Filipino nationality in 1974 and created ERDA Foundation "Education Research and Development Assistance". He managed to get 75,000 children out of poverty, prostitution, tetanus and hunger by helping their parents living in the slums of Manila to send their children to school and give them hope. To date, ERDA has already helped more than 800,000 children.

Father Tritz joined Raoul Follereau and his teams in 1976 and created FAHAN Foundation for the Assistance to Hansenite in coordination with the Philippines Leprosy Mission of the Philippine Ministry of Health. In 2000, there were 3,379 cases of leprosy in the Philippines. He decides to create a leper colony that is not only a treatment center for contagious cases but also a place of life for mutilated and excluded people.

Father Tritz, nicknamed “Father Teresa of Manila”, has received numerous awards including the Raoul Follereau Prize from the Académie Française in 1983 and the Legion of Honor in 1996.

He was fluent in French, Francic, German, English, Chinese, Spanish and Latin.

Cory Aquino, former President of the Republic of the Philippines, said: In India, there is Mother Teresa, in Cairo there is Sister Emmanuelle, in the Philippines we have Father Tritz
