= 1979 FAMAS Awards =

28th edition of Filipino movie awards

28th FAMAS Awards
- Date: 1979
- Site: Philippines

Highlights
- Best Picture: Pagputi ng Uwak, Pag-itim ng Tagak
- Most awards: Pagputi ng Uwak, Pag-itim ng Tagak (7 wins)

The 28th Filipino Academy of Movie Arts and Sciences Awards Night was held in 1979 in the Philippines. This event recognized outstanding achievements of the different films for the year 1978.

Pagputi ng Uwak, Pag-itim ng Tagak of VS Films was the most awarded film of the 27th FAMAS Awards winning the top prize for FAMAS Award for Best Picture, Best Director, Best Supporting Actress, Best Story, Best Cinematography, Best Musical Score and Best in Production Design.

== Awards ==
=== Major awards ===
Winners are listed first and highlighted with boldface.

Best Picture	Best Director
**Pagputi ng Uwak, Pag-itim ng Tagak — VS Films**; Atsay — Ian Film Productions; Gumising Ka, Maruja — FPJ Productions; Isang Gabi sa Iyo... Isang Gabi sa Akin — AA Productions; Rubia Servios — Sampaguita Pictures	**Celso Ad. Castillo — Pagputi ng Uwak, Pag-itim ng Tagak**; Eddie Garcia — Atsay; Lino Brocka — Gumising Ka, Maruja; Danny L. Zialcita — Hindi sa Iyo ang Mundo, Baby Porcuna; Ishmael Bernal — Isang Gabi sa Iyo... Isang Gabi sa Akin
Best Actor	Best Actress
**Mat Ranillo III — Isang Ama, Dalawang Ina**; Dolphy — Ang Tatay Kong Nanay as Dioscoro Derecho / Coring; Rudy Fernandez — Anak sa Una, Kasal sa Ina; Christopher De Leon — Lagi Na Lamang Ba Akong Babae? as Modesto	**Susan Roces — Gumising Ka, Maruja as Maruja**; Nora Aunor — Atsay as Nelia de Leon; Vilma Santos — Pagputi ng Uwak, Pag-itim ng Tagak as Julie Monserrat; Beth Bautista — Hindi sa Iyo ang Mundo, Baby Porcuna; Chanda Romero — Mananayaw
Best Supporting Actor	Best Supporting Actress
**George Estregan — Kid Kaliwete**; Angelo Ventura — Batang City Jail; Mario O'Hara — Gumising Ka, Maruja; Anthony Alonzo — Hindi sa Iyo ang Mundo, Baby Porcuna; Joonee Gamboa — Pagputi ng Uwak, Pag-itim ng Tagak	**Angie Ferro — Pagputi ng Uwak, Pag-itim ng Tagak**; Amy Austria — Atsay; Laurice Guillen — Gumising Ka, Maruja; Anita Linda — Mahal Mo, Mahal Ko; Marissa Delgado — Ang Tatay Kong Nanay as Mariana Jimenez
Best Child Actor	Best Child Actress
**Niño Muhlach — Ang Tatay Kong Nanay**; Bongchi Miraflor — Mahal Mo, Mahal Ko; Romnick Sarmienta — Pinagbuklod ng Pag-ibig; Bentot Jr. — Tatak ng Tundo	**Julie Vega — Mga Mata ni Angelita**; Maricel Soriano — Yakuza Contract
Best in Screenplay	Best Story
**Oscar Miranda — Isang Gabi sa Iyo... Isang Gabi sa Akin**; Celso Ad. Castillo, Lando Jacob, Iskho Lopez — Pagputi ng Uwak, Pag-itim ng Tagak	**Celso Ad. Castillo, Ruben Arthur Nicdao — Pagputi ng Uwak, Pag-itim ng Tagak**
Best Sound	Best Musical Score
**Rudy Baldovino — Gumising Ka, Maruja**	**George Canseco — Pagputi ng Uwak, Pag-itim ng Tagak**
Best Cinematography	Best Production Design
**Romeo Vitug — Pagputi ng Uwak, Pagitim ng Tagak**	**Peter Perlas — Pagputi ng Uwak, Pagitim ng Tagak**
Best Editing
**Augusto Salvador — Gumising Ka, Maruja**
