= Ang Tatay Kong Nanay =

- Official movie poster
- Directed by: Lino Brocka
- Written by: Orlando R. Nadres
- Produced by: Jesus B. Yu
- Starring: Dolphy; Niño Muhlach; Phillip Salvador
- Cinematography: Jose Batac Jr.
- Edited by: Augusto Salvador
- Music by: Lutgardo Labad
- Production company: Lotus Films
- Release date: June 2, 1978
- Running time: 116 minutes
- Country: Philippines
- Language: Filipino

Ang Tatay Kong Nanay (English: My Father, My Mother) is a 1978 Filipino comedy-drama film directed by Lino Brocka from a story and screenplay by Orlando R. Nadres. Starring Dolphy, Niño Muhlach, and Phillip Salvador, the film tackles parenting and homosexuality, and how it is not an issue in raising a child.

Produced by Lotus Films, the film was theatrically released on June 2, 1978.

== Plot ==
The story revolves around Coring, a gay beautician who was in love with a younger man named Dennis. Dennis had gotten his prostitute girlfriend, Mariana, pregnant, but the two couldn't handle the responsibility yet. Dennis then entrusts his child, Nonoy, to Coring, as he is set to leave the country, because he needs to work overseas to support the youngster. At first, Coring was hesitant but was easily convinced because he wanted Dennis to have a better future. The child grew up with Coring, and Nonoy believed that he was indeed his father. However, the story takes another turn as Mariana returns. The film tackles the hardships of being a single parent and, at the same time, the judgment towards homosexuality and parenting.

== Cast ==
Main cast

- Dolphy as Dioscoro "Coring" Derecho
- Nino Muhlach as Marlon Brando "Nonoy" Derecho
- Phillip Salvador as Dionisio "Dennis" Hammond
- Marissa Delgado as Mariana Jimenez

Supporting cast

- Lorli Villanueva as Bebang
- Soxie Topacio as Bading
- Orlando Nadres as Crispin "Crispina" Villa
- Larry Leviste as Rodrigo
- Renee Salud as Sabrina
- Inday Badiday as Herself

== Reception ==
=== Accolades ===
Award-giving organization	Date of ceremony	Category	Recipient(s)	Result	Ref.
28th FAMAS Awards	21 November 1979	Best Actor	Dolphy	Nominated	
28th FAMAS Awards	21 November 1979	Best Supporting Actress	Marissa Delgado	Nominated	
28th FAMAS Awards	21 November 1979	Best Child Actor	Niño Muhlach	Won	
3rd Gawad Urian Awards	1979	Best Actor	Dolphy	Nominated	
