= Rolly Quizon =

Filipino actor (born 1958)

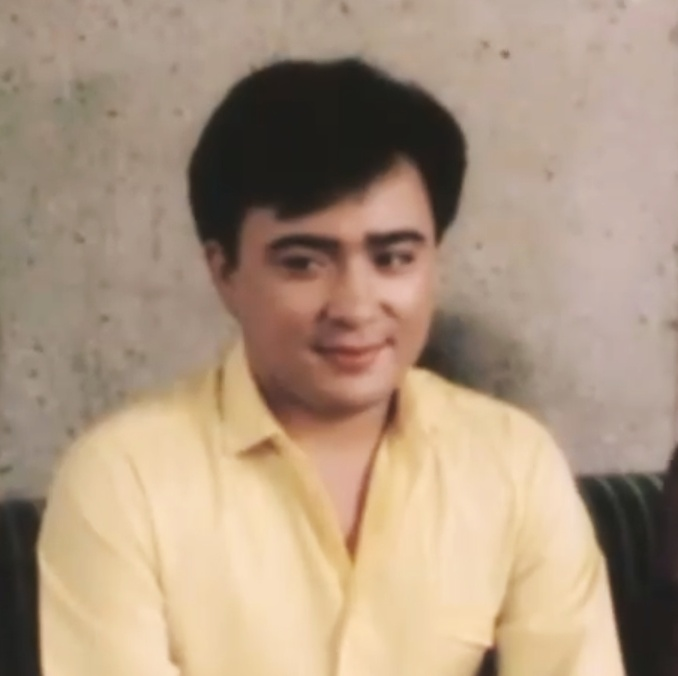
- Quizon in 1985
- Born: Raul Dominguez Quizon; October 5, 1958; Manila, Philippines
- Died: March 15, 2018 (aged 59); Quezon City, Philippines
- Education: Notre Dame of Manila
- Occupations: Actor, dancer
- Years active: 1966–1991, 1995, 1997–1998
- Parents: Rodolfo Vera Quizon (father); Engracita Dominguez (mother)
- Relatives: Freddie Quizon (brother); Eric Quizon (half-brother); Epy Quizon (half-brother); Dino Quizon (half-brother); Vandolph Quizon (half-brother); Zia Quizon (half-sister); Manny Boy Quizon (brother); Sahlee Quizon (sister); Edgar Quizon (brother); Dolphy, Jr. (brother)

Raul Dominguez Quizon (October 5, 1958 – March 15, 2018), better known as Rolly Quizon, was a Filipino actor, and one of Dolphy's children. He gained recognition for portraying namesake character Rolly Puruntong in the Filipino television sitcom John en Marsha.

== Life and Career ==
Raul Dominguez Quizon was born on October 5, 1958, the youngest among their six children. He has 12 half-siblings.

Quizon's performance as a guest in an episode of Dolphy's Special was noticed by Dolphy, and together with Director Ading Fernando, included him in the cast of John en Marsha. During his career, he starred in a number of movies, largely with RVQ Productions alongside Dolphy.

He had a son.

== Illness and death ==
On March 9, 2018, Quizon had a stroke, and died six days later.

== Filmography ==
=== Film ===
Year	Movie Title	Role
1966	Si Siyanang at ang 7 Tsikiting	
1968	Good Morning Titser	
1968	Pag-ibig, Masdan Mo ang Ginawa Mo	
1969	Sampung Labuyo	Kapre
1970	Tulak ng Bibig, Kabig ng Dibdib	Raul Castro
1971	Family Planting	
1974	Sarhento Fofonggay: A, Ewan!	Rolly
1974	John and Marsha	Rolly Puruntong
1974	Bornebol: Special Agent	Jon-Jon Graho
1974	Biyenan Ko ang Aking Anak	
1975	John and Marsha sa Amerika (Part Two)	Rolly Puruntong
1975	Jack and Jill and John	Sherlock
1975	The Goodfather	
1976	Let's Do the Salsa	
1976	Ay, Manuela!	Mike Vera
1976	Sa Kisame Street	Marlon
1977	John and Marsha '77	Rolly Puruntong
1977	Anong Uri ng Hayop Kami Dito sa Daigdig	
1977	Burlesk Queen	Jessie Castillo
1978	Jack n' Jill of the Third Kind	Raul Calvo
1979	Disgrasyada	Rodrigo
1979	Dancing Master	Arnold
1979	Rock, Baby, Rock	
1980	Beach House	
1980	Dolphy's Angels	Special Participation
1980	John en Marsha '80	Rolly Puruntong
1980	Bongga Ka 'Day	
1980	Kung Ako'y Iiwan Mo	Mike
1982	My Heart Belongs to Daddy	Eric Jacinto
1982	Mga Kanyon ni Mang Simeon	Gaspar
1982	Dancing Master 2: Macao Connection	Arnold
1982	My Juan and Only	Ricky (Ricardo, Carding)
1983	Da Best of John en Marsha sa Pelikula	Rolly Puruntong
1983	Bundok ng Susong Dalaga	
1984	Da Best of John en Marsha sa Pelikula Part II	Rolly Puruntong
1985	John en Marsha '85 (sa Probinsya)	Rolly Puruntong
1985	Goat Buster	Marlon
1986	John en Marsha '86: TNT sa Amerika	Rolly Puruntong
1986	Kalabog en Bosyo Strike Again	Trece Medya
1987	Ang Nusog at 3 Itlog	
1987	Mga Anak ni Facifica Falayfay	Rolando "Rolly" Manalastas
1991	John en Marsha Ngayon '91	Rolly Puruntong
1995	Batas ang Katapat Mo	Robber
1997	Boy Buluran: Headhunter ng Maynila	
1997	Hawak Ko Buhay Mo	Skillet
1998	Strebel: Gestapo ng Maynila	Lt. Nolasco

=== Television ===
Year	Title	Role
1973–1990	John en Marsha	Rolly Puruntong
1976	Seeing Stars with Joe Quirino	Himself
1984	Loveli-Ness	Guest
2007	John en Shirley	Rolly Puruntong (voice only)

=== Musical Variety Show, Stage ===
Year	Title	Role
1984 - 198?	Call It... Guts!	Main cast

== Awards and nominations ==
Year	Award-giving body	Category	Work	Result
1977	Metro Manila Film Festival	Best Actor	Burlesk Queen	Won
1978	Gawad Urian Award	Best Supporting Actor	Burlesk Queen	Nominated
