= Eulogio Lerum =

Eulogio Lerum GOGH
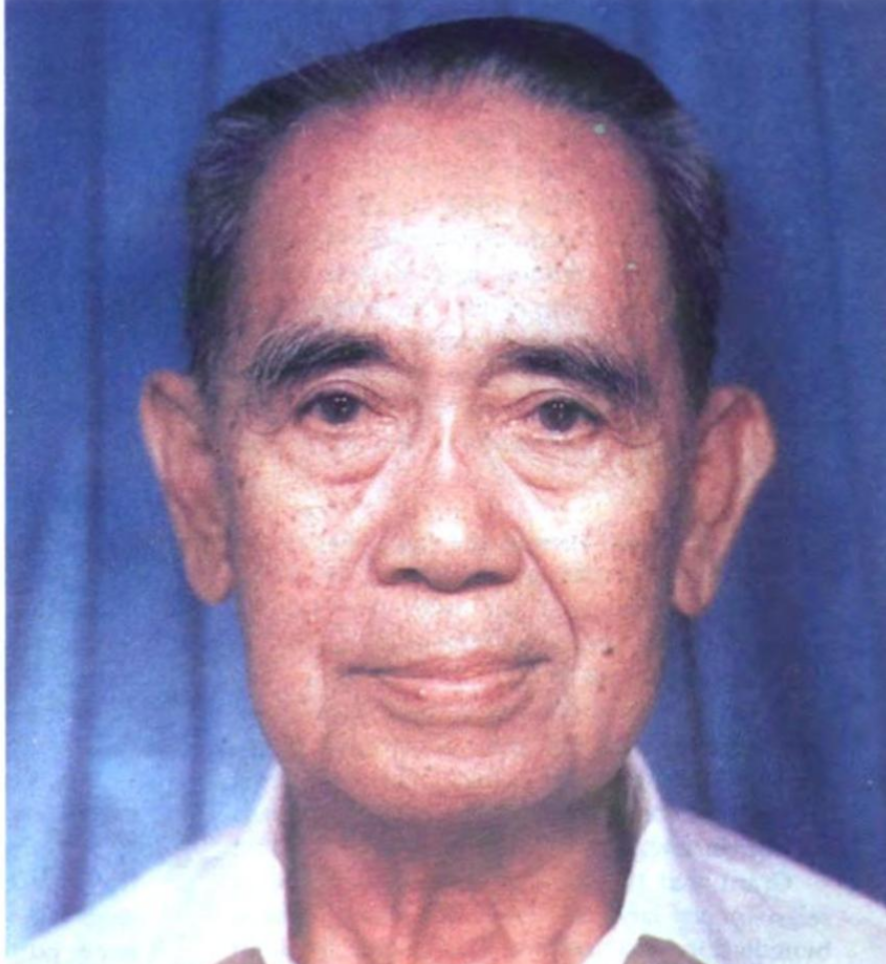
- Lerum from the Official Directory of the Constitutional Commission, c. 1986

Member of the Philippine House of Representatives for Industrial labor
- In office 1978–1986
- Succeeded by: Adelisa Almario-Raymundo (appointed in 1987)

Philippine Constitutional Commission of 1986
- In office 1986–1986
- Appointed by: Corazon Aquino

Personal details
- Born: 1908 Calauag,Tayabas, Philippine Islands

Eulogio Ramos Lerum GOGH (1908-unknown) was a Filipino politician and labor union leader. He was formerly the president of the Philippines' National Labor Union. In 1978, he became sectoral representative for organized labor from Luzon in the Philippine Congress under Philippine president Ferdinand Marcos Sr.

== Early career ==
Born in Calauag, Tayabas, Philippines, he was a farmer who became a union leader. During his time as a Filipino worker, his employer dismissed Lerum from his job due to his "union activities". The Court of Industrial Relations, however, declared his dismissal unjustified.

After the 1963 elections, Philippine president Diosdado Macapagal gave two of the five seats on the Social Security System (SSS) board of directors to Lerum and Carlos Santiago.

== As a labor leader ==
He led the labor delegation in the 1975 National Tripartite Conference and sponsored key benefits like the thirteenth month pay and night work premium. Lerum raised the minimum wage to Php37.00 and was a prominent leader in the National Labor Union.

== As legislator ==
Lerum was one of the 48 members of the Constitutional Commission (ConCom) which drafted the 1987 Philippine Constitution.

=== Establishment of a fifteen-member Supreme Court ===
The Constitutional Commission's journal shows that the original plan was for an eleven-member Supreme Court. Commissioner Eulogio Lerum wanted to raise it to fifteen and suggested filling any vacancy within two months. His 15-member proposal was not accepted at first. Lerum wanted to ensure the Court's size remained stable by adding a rule to fill any vacancy in two months. After agreeing to extend this period to three months, the proposal was approved. Ultimately, the Commission decided on a fifteen-member Court, requiring vacancies to be filled within 90 days.

== Later years ==
During the celebration of Labor Day in 2002, Lerum was honored by the Philippine government for his contributions to the Philippine labor movement.
