= The Goodfather =

1975 comedy film starring Dolphy and Boots Anson-Roa

- Directed by: Al Quinn
- Screenplay by: Fundador Soriano; Roy Vera Cruz
- Story by: Roy Vera Cruz
- Starring: Dolphy; Boots Anson-Roa; Dolphy Jr.; Rolly Quizon; Manny Boy Quizon; Freddie Quizon; Edgar Quizon; Sahlee Quizon; Marissa Delgado; Rudy Fernandez
- Cinematography: Manuel Bulotano
- Music by: Dominic Salustiano
- Production company: RVQ Productions
- Release date: December 25, 1975
- Country: Philippines
- Language: Filipino

The Goodfather is a 1975 Filipino comedy drama film directed by Al Quinn and starring Dolphy as the titular character, alongside Boots Anson-Roa, Marissa Delgado, Rudy Fernandez, and his children: Dolphy Jr., Rolly Quizon, Manny Boy Quizon, Freddie Quizon, Edgar Quizon, and Sahlee Quizon. Titled in reference to the American drama film The Godfather, the film was released by Dolphy's production company RVQ Productions on December 25, 1975.

Critic Justino Dormiendo of Sagisag gave the film a negative review for its melodrama, toilet humor and commonplace musical scenes.

== Cast ==
- Dolphy
- Boots Anson-Roa
- Dolphy Jr.
- Rolly Quizon
- Manny Boy Quizon
- Freddie Quizon
- Edgar Quizon
- Sahlee Quizon
- Marissa Delgado
- Rudy Fernandez
- Edith Padilla
- Ike Fernando
- Moody Diaz
- Er Canton Salazar
- Max Vera
- Rona Mercado

== Production ==
Actress Boots Anson-Roa considered Dolphy to be inspiring and comfortable to work with on set, describing him as compassionate in his role as a film producer in order to provide work in the film industry.

It was the last film to feature all six of Dolphy's initial children with actress Engracita Dominguez.

== Critical response ==
Justino Dormiendo, writing for Sagisag, gave The Goodfather a negative review. He cited the film's melodrama, toilet humor, filler scenes, and the presence of song-and-dance numbers that are already found in local television musicals.
