= Facifica Falayfay =

- Directed by: Luciano B. Carlos
- Based on: Facifica Falayfay by Mars Ravelo
- Produced by: Rodolfo V. Quizon
- Starring: Dolphy
- Cinematography: Manoling Bolutano
- Music by: Restie Umali
- Production company: RVQ Productions
- Release date: June 15, 1969
- Country: Philippines
- Language: Filipino

Facifica Falayfay is a 1969 Filipino movie starring Dolphy, adapted from Mars Ravelo’s series of superhero comics. A sequel, Mga Anak ni Facifica Falayfay, was released in 1987.

== Plot ==
A young boy, Facifica (Dolphy) is raised as a girl by his mother, Aling Kobay (Dely Atay-atayan), who had been longing for a daughter. When Facifica’s mother dies, his brothers tries to teach him combat skills and how to act like a "real man." Later, he meets Pilar (Pilar Pilapil), a movie star that Facifica idolizes. He falls in love with her and feels the need to protect her.

== Cast ==
- Dolphy as Facifica Falayfay
- Panchito
- Pilar Pilapil as Ligaya
- Rod Navarro
- Martin Marfil
- Dely Atay-atayan

== Reception ==
Referred to as Dolphy's ultimate queer movie, critics preferred if Facifica did not become straight and ended up as best friends with Ligaya, his leading lady.

== See also ==
- Mga Anak ni Facifica Falayfay
