= Freddie Quizon =

Filipino actor

- Born: Wilfredo Dominguez Quizon; July 27, 1956; Manila, Philippines
- Died: November 18, 2005 (aged 49); Manila, Philippines
- Other names: F.Q.
- Occupations: Actor, comedian, production coordinator
- Years active: 1971–2002
- Spouse: Nelda Sisic
- Children: Rowell Quizon; Nico Quizon; John-John Quizon
- Parent(s): Rodolfo Vera Quizon (father); Engracita Dominguez (mother)
- Relatives: Rolly Quizon (brother); Eric Quizon (half-brother); Epy Quizon (half-brother); Vandolph (half-brother); Zia Quizon (half-sister)

Wilfredo "Freddie" Dominguez Quizon (July 27, 1956 – November 18, 2005) was the son of Comedy King Dolphy and Engracita Dominguez.

== Life and career ==
Quizon was born in Manila. He is the fourth child of Rodolfo V. Quizon and Gracita Dominguez. He was married to Nelda Quizon and had three sons: Rowell, Nico and John John Quizon.

== Death ==
He died from injuries he sustained after he fell inside his home. He was buried at the Quizon mausoleum in Quezon City.

== Filmography ==
=== Actor ===
Year	Title	Role
1971	Family Planting	
1975	The Goodfather	
1976	Ay, Manuela!	Peter Vera
1977	Beerhouse	Tito
1979	Buhay Artista Ngayon	
1980	Dolphy's Angels	
1982	Mga Kanyon ni Mang Simeon	Manuel
1984	Daddy's Little Darlings	
1987	Bata-Batuta	
1989	Pulis, Pulis sa Ilalim ng Tulay	Policeman
1993	Home Along Da Riles: Da Movie	Freddie
1994	Abrakadabra	Eddie
1996	Da Best in Da West 2: Da Western Police Istori	Erik
1997	Home Along Da Riles 2	Sergio
1998	Haba-Baba-Doo! Puti-Puti-Poo!	Boy George
1998	'Tong Tatlong Tatay Kong Pakitong Kitong	Freddie
1998	Ala Eh con Bisoy, Hale Hale Hoy! (Laging Panalo ang Mga Unggoy)	Freddie
2000	Markova: Comfort Gay	Robert "Bobby" Dempster
2002	Home Along Da Riber	Sam's men

=== Miscellaneous Crew ===
Year	Title	Crew
1975	John En Marsha sa Amerika	Production Coordinator
