= Dely Atay-Atayan =

Filipina comedian and singer (1914–2004)

- Born: Adelaida Marquez Fernando; March 17, 1914; Tondo, Manila, Philippine Islands
- Died: August 30, 2004 (aged 90); Parañaque, Philippines
- Resting place: Himlayang Pilipino, Tandang Sora, Quezon City, Philippines
- Occupations: Comedian, singer
- Years active: 1930–1994
- Spouses: Andoy Balunbalunan (m. 1934; died 1944) Catalino Ong (m. 1944)

Adelaida Fernando-Villegas (born Adelaida Marquez Fernando; March 17, 1914 – August 30, 2004), better known as Dely Atay-Atayan or Adelaida Fernando, was a Filipina comedian and singer. Her career in entertainment spanned seven decades, beginning in bodabil and ending in television.

== Biography ==
Atay-Atayan was born as Adelaida Marquez Fernando in Tondo, Manila, to painter Amado Fernando and singer Carmen Marquez. One of her younger brothers, Ading Fernando, would grow up to be a prominent television comedian and director.

Atay-Atayan had completed her second year in high school when she broke into showbusiness as a kundiman singer at the Palace Theater in Manila. From 1930 to 1934, she toured with a bodabil troupe, billing herself as "The Queen of Laughs". She made her film debut in 1940 with Lakambini, where she played opposite her husband, comedian Andoy Balunbalunan. After Balunbalunan's death, she married Catalino Ong.

== Career ==
From 1940 until 1994, Atay-Atayan appeared in over 300 films. She was also a popular comedian on radio, starring in programs such as Tangtarang-Tang. She formed a comedic quartet with Pugak, Lopito and Doro de los Ojos, calling themselves "Ancient Fox".

Her most famous role was as Doña Delilah, the wealthy, imperious and disapproving mother-in-law of John Puruntong (Dolphy) in the RPN sitcom John en Marsha, which was created by her brother Ading and ran for seventeen years. Her portrayal proved as the definitive "mother-in-law" archetype in Filipino popular culture. Her famous tagline, uttered without fail in every episode to John Puruntong, was a scathing admonition: "Magsumikap ka!" ("Strive harder!") She also popularized the Filipino catchphrase "Hudas! Barabas! Hestas!" in this sitcom.

Atay-Atayan had another famous role as the mother of Vic Ungassis (played by Vic Sotto) in the sitcom Iskul Bukol. Her character came from the town of Tiaong, Quezon, and popularized the term of endearment "Bunsoy!" for addressing Vic. The root word "bunso" is Tagalog for youngest child.

Her last movie was Chick Boy in 1994 following her retirement in the same year.

== Death ==
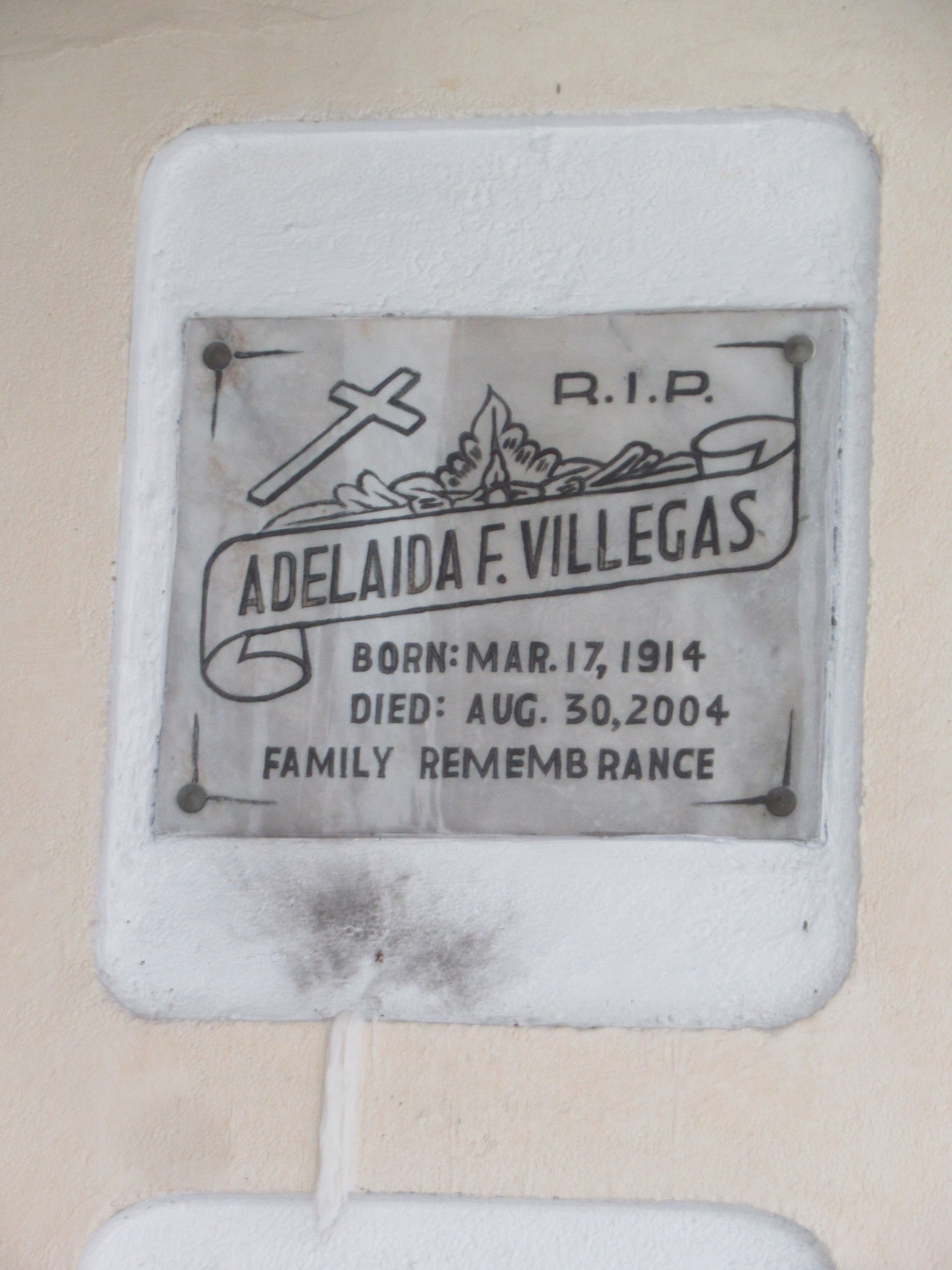
Adelaida Fernando-Villegas' grave at Himlayang Pilipino Memorial Park mausoleum (Quezon City).

In 1999, she was diagnosed to be having gallstones and by 2002 she will no longer walk. She had been bedridden for two years. On August 30, 2004, she died at the Parañaque Medical Hospital of natural causes. She was 90. She was cremated, her ashes inurned at her family mausoleum in Himlayang Pilipino in Quezon City.

== Filmography ==
=== Film ===
- 1938 - Lakambini
- 1940 - Libingang Bakal
- 1940 - Gunita
- 1940 - Nag-iisang Sangla
- 1947 - Bakya Mo Neneng
- 1948 - Ang Anghel sa Lupa
- 1948 - Wala na Akong Iluha
- 1948 - Itanong mo sa Bulaklak
- 1948 - Bulaklak at Paruparo
- 1948 - Maliit Lamang ang Daigdig
- 1948 - Isang Dakot na Bigas
- 1949 - Kayumanggi
- 1949 - Anak ng Panday
- 1949 - Halik sa Bandila
- 1949 - Kumander Sundang
- 1949 - Kay Ganda ng Umaga
- 1949 - Dugo ng Katipunan
- 1949 - Padre Burgos
- 1950 - 48 Oras
- 1950 - Tatlong Balaraw
- 1950 - Kenkoy
- 1951 - Bahay na Tisa
- 1951 - Diego Silang
- 1952 - Nicomedes
- 1953 - Highway 54
- 1953 - Kambal na Lihim
- 1953 - Tayo'y Mag-aliw
- 1953 - Sa Hirap at Ginhawa
- 1953 - Tampalasan
- 1954 - Selosong Balo
- 1954 - May Bakas Ang Lumipas
- 1956 - Mr. & Mrs. [People's]
- 1956 - Bella Filipina
- 1957 - Bicol Express
- 1957 - H-Line Gang
- 1958 - Kilabot sa Sta. Barbara
- 1959 - Ang Kanyang Kamahalan
- 1959 - Big Time Berto
- 1959 - Pitong Gatang
- 1968 - Buhay Bombero
- 1969 - Facifica Falayfay
- 1969 - Impasse
- 1970 - With These Hands
- 1972 - Love Pinoy Style
- 1973 - John and Marsha
- 1976 - Magsikap: Kayod sa Araw, Kayod sa Gabi
- 1976 - John and Marsha 2
- 1977 - Omeng Satanasia
- 1977 - John and Marsha 3
- 1977 - Silang mga Mukhang Pera
- 1980 - John and Marsha 4
- 1981 - Tropang Bulilit
- 1984 - Da Best of John & Marsha
- 1985 - Ride on Baby
- 1985 - Kapag Baboy ang Inutang
- 1985 - John and Marsha sa Probinsya
- 1985 - Like Father, Like Son
- 1988 - Baleleng at ang Ginto Sirena
- 1988 - Haw Haw de Karabaw
- 1989 - Everlasting Love
- 1990 - Samson & Goliath
- 1991 - John and Marsha '91
- 1994 - Chick Boy
- 1995 - Home Sic Home

=== Television ===
Year	Title	Role
1973–1987	Seeing Stars With Joe Quirino	
1973–1990	John en Marsha	Doña Delilah G. Jones
1978–1988	Iskul Bukol	Aling Jacoba or Inang
1983–1986	Penthouse Seven	

== Awards and nominations ==
Awards and nominations
Year	Award giving body	Category	Nominated work/ Person	Results
2001	19th Film Academy of the Philippines Awards	Lifetime Achievement Awards	Dely Atay-Atayan	Won
