= Home Sic Home =

Philippine comedy film

- Directed by: Efren "Loging" Jarlego
- Written by: Loida Viriña
- Produced by: Simon C. Ongpin; Malou N. Santos
- Starring: Dolphy; Dina Bonnevie; Babalu; Eric Quizon; Panchito
- Cinematography: Oscar Querijero
- Edited by: Edgardo Jarlego
- Music by: Mon del Rosario
- Production company: Star Cinema
- Distributed by: Star Cinema
- Release date: June 21, 1995
- Running time: 123 minutes
- Country: Philippines
- Language: Filipino

Home Sic Home is a 1995 Philippine comedy film directed by Efren Jarlego. The film stars Dolphy, Dina Bonnevie, Babalu, Eric Quizon and Panchito. A play on the word "homesick", it was one of the entries in the 1995 Manila Film Festival. The film, which was shot in Los Angeles, California tells about three individuals who tried their luck in the United States, but realizing that it's still better living in the Philippines.

Produced and distributed by Star Cinema, the film was theatrically released on June 21, 1995. In 2023, the film was digitally restored and remastered in 2K resolution by ABS-CBN Film Restoration and Central Digital Lab. The film is streaming online on YouTube.

== Plot ==
Berto lives a simple life with his younger son Jun, who is married to Luisa and has a son Boy whom Berto dotes on. Despite his advanced age, he and his best friend Robin accept carpentry jobs to earn a living. But the duo would always get the ire of his neighbor Mang Andres and his single daughter Melanie for always botching jobs that lead to Melanie's father always injured. By twist of fate, Berto, and Melanie received welcome news from the US Embassy when their visa applications for America were granted. Berto received a petition from his eldest son Ricky while Melanie's work visa was approved. Robin on the other hand, who won in a raffle promo a two-way ticket to the United States, wanted to find his uncle whom he believes has found success in America and lives in a mansion.

Berto, Robin and Melanie's paths crossed again at the airport where it turned out they are boarding the same flight. Melanie got upset when the airline declined her request to get a seat away from Berto and Robin due to what happened to her father. Upon landing in Los Angeles, they lead separate ways where Ricky fetched Berto and Robin while Melanie had her cousin Lally fetching her.

Berto ended up having a hard time adjusting to life in America due to cultural differences. He also had to take care of Robin as well because Robin's uncle died and had no other relative to stay with. The duo would also cross paths later on with Melanie whom they saved from thugs. As gratitude, Melanie got them to work as caregivers in the same nursing home she was employed with Lally. But due to immigration officers going hard on illegal immigrants working in the US with no proper documents, Berto and Melanie decided to have an arranged marriage so that she won't be deported. Berto agreed to marry Melanie upon learning that his grandson Boy needed to undergo surgery after being hit by a tricycle.

In the end, Berto got homesick and longed for his family which lead him to pursue long-distance calls using Ricky's phone. After their vacation in Las Vegas, Berto was confronted by Ricky's family because of his late night outs and increasing phone bills, as told by his grandson Robbie. Berto was forced to admit his marriage to Melanie, his job as a caregiver and the long-distance calls he frequently made due to Jun's son hurt in an accident. Ricky forgave Berto for his shortcomings and was supposed to scold Robbie for his mischief as well. As Robbie walked out on the family to avoid conflict, Berto followed his grandson who did not see a car passing by their house and was able to save him, injuring himself in the process. At the hospital, Robbie apologized for his actions, to which Berto forgives him. At the same time, he decides with finality to go home to the Philippines with Melanie and Robin. At the airport, Mang Andres excitedly picks up his daughter Melanie who is already pregnant with Berto's child. Upon probing who the father was and Berto showing up in front of him, he faints.

== Cast ==
- Dolphy as Berto
- Dina Bonnevie as Melanie
- Babalu as Robin
- Eric Quizon as Jun
- Panchito as Pancho
- Maila Gumila as Luisa
- Carl Angelo Legaspi as Boy
- Jay Kevin as Robbie
- Bryan Santos as Brian
- Don Pepot as Kulas
- Imelda Ilanan as Aling Upeng
- Jon Achaval as Mang Andres
- Mandy Ochoa as Ricky
- Jackie Castillejos as Becky
- Miel Barrios as Lally
- Noreen Aguas as Nene
- Evelyn Bontogon-Guerrero as Hysterical Passenger
- Alfred Manal as Naughty Boy
- Anna Ramsey as Nurse Supervisor
- Laura Cooper as Doctor
- Dely Atay-Atayan as Jun's mother-in-law

== Awards ==
Year	Awards	Category	Recipient	Result	Ref.
1995	5th Manila Film Festival	Best Director	Efren Jarlego	Won	
1995	5th Manila Film Festival	Best Supporting Actor	Babalu	Won	
1995	5th Manila Film Festival	Best Child Performer	Carl Angelo Legaspi	Won	
1995	5th Manila Film Festival	Best Cinematography	Oscar Querijero	Won	
1995	5th Manila Film Festival	Best Sound Recording	Ramon Reyes	Won	
