= Father Jejemon =

- Film poster
- Directed by: Frank Gray Jr.
- Screenplay by: Bibeth Orteza; Rhandy Reyes
- Produced by: Rodolfo V. Quizon
- Starring: Dolphy
- Cinematography: Alex Espartero
- Edited by: Efren Jarlego
- Music by: Mon Del Rosario
- Production company: RVQ Productions
- Release date: December 25, 2010
- Running time: 105 minutes
- Country: Philippines
- Language: Filipino

Father Jejemon is a 2010 Philippine comedy drama film directed by Frank Gray Jr from a screenplay written by Bibeth Orteza and Rhandy Reyes. The film stars Dolphy, in his final film role before his death in July 2012, as the titular priest.

Produced by RVQ Productions, the film was theatrically released on December 25, 2010, as one of the entries of the 36th Metro Manila Film Festival.

== Premise ==
The town of Parmbil is assigned a new parish priest. Fr. Jeremiah Jerome Montes, better known as “Fr. Jejemon”, succeeds Fr. Baby, who has stepped down due to declining health.

Not all the townsfolk immediately accept Fr. Jejemon and his unusual approach to pastoral care, so he works hard to win their confidence. The priest also deals with Mr. P, a rich businessman who wants to seize control of the church grounds and the town.

== Cast ==
- Dolphy as Fr. Jeremiah "Jejemon" Jerome Montes. The new parish priest of Parmbil with an unconventional approach, attire and demeanor. He speaks in Jejemon slang, has an affinity for rock music, and loves to organize talent competitions and other novel events for the parish’s youth.
- Cherie Gil as Violeta. She is not fond of Father Jejemon, and wants him out of the parish.
- Maja Salvador as Isabel, Violeta's teenaged daughter who support's Father Jejemon's endeavors.
- Roy Alvarez as Mr. P, a rich, manipulative businessman who seeks to control Parmbil.
- Ejay Falcon as Luis, Mr. P's son and Isabel’s suitor.
- Nash Aguas as Carlo
- Tony Mabesa as Fr. Baby, Jejemon's predecessor as parish priest.
- Moymoy and Roadfil as Moy and Moy

== Production ==
=== Development ===
Father Jejemon was produced under RVQ Productions with Frank Gray Jr. as its director. The film is Gray's first work since the 1977 film Omeng Satanasia. Bibeth Orteza and Rhandy Reyes did the screenplay. Dominican priest Larry Faraon served as a story consultant.

Dolphy came up with the idea to create a film about a priest, as it was his long-time dream to portray a clergyman since his real-life uncle was a priest. Dolphy was initially hesitant due to fear of the film being censored, but his uncle offered to help write the script. The idea was shelved when his uncle died.

=== Communion scenes ===
The film still received backlash from leaders of the Philippine Catholic Church for depictions of the communion; one scene shows the priest accidentally dropping a host between a woman's breasts, while another host is caught in a worshipper’s false teeth. The Movie and Television Review and Classification Board received a complaint over these contentious scenes. Consultant Fr. Faraon approved the scenes, reasoning that these scenarios actually happen in real life. These ultimately were voluntarily edited out by the production studio for the theatrical release, and the film passed a second review by the MTRCB.

== Release ==
Father Jejemon was released in the Philippines on December 25, 2010 as one of the official entries of the 2010 Metro Manila Film Festival.

== Awards and nominations ==
Awards and nominations
Year	Award giving body	Category	Nominated work/ Person	Results
2011	29th Film Academy of the Philippines (FAP) Awards	Best Actor	Dolphy	Won
2010	2010 Metro Manila Film Festival	Best Actor	Dolphy	Won
