= John en Marsha =

Philippine TV series

- Genre: Situational comedy
- Created by: Ading Fernando
- Directed by: Ading Fernando; Al Quinn; Apollo Arellano
- Starring: Dolphy; Nida Blanca
- Opening theme: "Rubber Ducky" by Quincy Jones
- Country of origin: Philippines
- Original language: Filipino
- No. of episodes: 405

Production
- Running time: 60 minutes

Original release
- Network: KBS/RPN/New Vision 9
- Release: November 22, 1973 – 1978
- Release: July 25, 1980 – March 19, 1990

Related
- John en Shirley (ABS-CBN); John en Ellen (TV5)

John en Marsha (English: John and Marsha) is a Philippine television sitcom series broadcast by KBS/RPN/New Vision 9. Directed by Ading Fernando, Al Quinn and Apollo Arellano, it stars Dolphy, Nida Blanca, Rolly Quizon, Dely Atay-Atayan and Maricel Soriano. It aired from November 22, 1973 to 1978. The series returned from July 25, 1980 to March 19, 1990.

== Plot ==
Marsha Jones marries the impoverished John Puruntong, much to the dismay of her wealthy mother, Doña Delilah. The latter often pays a visit to their house along with her serving-maid Matutina (played by comedienne Evelyn Bontogon). When money was needed, she would tell Matutina to go sweep peso bills off the floor.

Despite this, John rejects all the financial assistance Doña Delilah offers his family, resulting in a hilarious exchange of insults between the two. The show usually ends with Doña Delilah screaming her catchphrase "Kaya ikaw, John, magsumikap ka!" ("Therefore, John, you must work hard!") to insult John's capability as the father of the household. They end up making amends, giving each other abrupt hugs with Doña Delilah exclaiming "Peace, man!"

== Cast ==
The Puruntong family in 1975 (from top left: Matutina and Dely Atay-Atayan; bottom left to right: Maricel Soriano, Dolphy, Nida Blanca, and Rolly Quizon.

=== Main Cast ===
- Dolphy as John H. Puruntong - The main protagonist of the story who was married to Marsha, a daughter of a rich woman, Doña Delilah. Despite her richness, John rejects all the financial assistance Doña Delilah offers his family, resulting in a hilarious exchange of insults between the two.
- Nida Blanca as Marsha J. Puruntong - John's loving wife and Doña Delilah's daughter.

=== Supporting Cast ===
- Dely Atay-Atayan as Doña Delilah G. Jones - Marsha's rich, protective mother and a domineering mother-in-law to John. She often visits the Puruntong Household along with her serving-maid Matutina.
- Evelyn Bontogon-Guerrero as Matutina - Doña Delilah's maid and "sidekick". When money was needed, she was ordered to go sweep peso bills off the floor.
- Rolly Quizon as Rolly J. Puruntong - John and Marsha's eldest son.
- Maricel Soriano (1973-1988) and Sheryl Cruz (1988-1990) as Shirley J. Puruntong - John and Marsha's sweet daughter. Shirley is a pretty and smart girl who attracts many suitors.
- Madel de Leon as Madel Puruntong - Rolly's wife and the daughter-in-law of John and Marsha.
- Kennely Ann Lacia as Joanna Marie "Ken-ken" Puruntong - Rolly and Madel's daughter.
- Atong Redillas as Atong "John-John" J. Puruntong - John and Marsha's youngest son.
- Isko Salvador as Francisco "Isko" Francisco - The neighborhood storekeeper and a suitor of Shirley.
- Divino Reyes as Vino Apitong
- Ben Tisoy as Tisoy F. Kennedy
- Romulo Livino as Mulong Yakal
- Erlinda Cortez as the voice of Madonna - The Puruntong Family's pet bird.

== Films ==
The series spawned multiple movie incarnations from 1974 to 1991:
Year	Title
1974	John & Marsha
1975	John & Marsha sa Amerika (Part Two)
1977	John & Marsha '77
1980	John & Marsha '80
1983	Da Best of John en Marsha sa Pelikula
1984	Da Best of John & Marsha sa Pelikula Part II
1985	John & Marsha '85 (Sa Probinsya)
1986	John & Marsha '86: TNT sa Amerika
1991	John en Marsha Ngayon '91

== Spin-off ==
John En Shirley
- Title card
- Genre: Situational comedy
- Created by: Bert De Leon
- Based on: John En Marsha
- Developed by: Bert De Leon
- Written by: Bert de Leon; Bibeth Orteza; Viva de Leon; Divino Reyes; Woodrow Serafin; Rhandy Reyes
- Directed by: Bert de Leon
- Starring: Dolphy; Susan Roces; Maricel Soriano
- No. of episodes: 64

Production
- Executive producer: Christine Rosales Nini Patricia Collada
- Producer: Kitchie Benedicto-Paulino
- Editor: James Arellano
- Running time: 27-48 minutes
- Production companies: KB Entertainment Unlimited, INC.

Original release
- Network: ABS-CBN
- Release: July 29, 2006 – October 27, 2007

John En Shirley is a Philippine television sitcom series broadcast by ABS-CBN. Directed by Bert de Leon, it stars Dolphy, Maricel Soriano,Susan Roces, Vandolph, Noel Trinidad, Richie Macapagal, Mich Dulce, Janna Baker, Ivan David, Robert Ortega, Arlene Tolibas, Isko Salvador, Bayani Agbayani, Pooh, Evelyn Bontogon-Guerrero and Ricci Chan. It aired on the network's Saturday evening line up from July 29, 2006 to October 27, 2007, replacing Quizon Avenue and was replaced by Super Inggo 1.5: Ang Bagong Bangis.

The series is currently available on Jeepney TV's YouTube channel (some of the episodes are unavailable, resulting only 59 episodes of the series is available).

=== Premise ===
The show follows the life of the Puruntongs after the events of the original show (John En Marsha).

=== Cast ===
==== Main Cast ====
- Dolphy as John H. Puruntong - Now living with his daughter, Shirley. He is a wise and honest man who still grieves the death of his beloved wife, Marsha. He strives to give the best for his family because he is the loving daddy of Atong and Shirley.
- Susan Roces as Encarnacion "Encar" Ramirez - Shirley's mother-in-law, the new center of John's life. She is meticulous and meddlesome.
- Maricel Soriano as Shirley Puruntong-Ramirez - Now married with Bernie and a mother to their two children, Nicole and JP. Shirley grew up to be like her daddy, being a daughter and a mommy is her challenge.

==== Supporting Cast ====
- Vandolph as Atong J. Puruntong - Now living with his Daddy John and sister, Shirley. He is always in trouble. Although his intentions are noble, he still ends up dealing with the wrong people.
- Noel Trinidad as Rene Ramirez - Encar's husband and Shirley's father-in-law. A great under to his wife, nothing can be said when he is by his wife's side. But life is like electricity as long as he is with John, his best friend.
- Richie Macapagal as Bernie Ramirez - Shirley's loving husband. He is dedicated to their family. He's different from his mommy Encar because his idol is John, his father-in-law.
- Mich Dulce as Mich Ramirez - Shirley's strange sister-in-law who feels super smart and pretty. It's annoying when she brags about her baby talk.
- Janna Baker as Nicole Puruntong - Shirley's teenage daughter from her first lover. She is so pretty and smart. The Ramirezes love her very much even though she is not actually related to them by blood. She always imitates her Grandma Encar's actions.
- Ivan David as JP P. Ramirez - Shirley and Bernie's mischievous youngest son. Like Grandpa John, he is obedient and humble, that's why he's super lovable.
- Robert Ortega as Robert - Shirley's boss. Being smart and handsome, he will do anything to get what he wants.
- Arlene Tolibas as Aling Chona - A Sari-sari Store owner and a gossipmonger in the neighborhood.
- Isko Salvador as Isko Francisco - Now is a co-owner of a Beauty Parlor owned by John and Atong nearby Chona's store. He still likes Shirley even though she's married.
- Bayani Agbayani as Tengteng - A friend of John who works in the Beauty Parlor. He provides the comic-relief of the show.
- Pooh as Jovanni "Jovan" Da Vinci - A "professional" stylish from Italy who was hired by Isko for the Beauty Parlor.
- Evelyn Bontogon-Guerrero as Matutina - After the death of Doña Delilah G. Jones, Matutina is now in Davao. From being a domestic helper in the Jones' residence, she is now an ultra-wealthy businesswoman who owns several airplanes and 10 jetplanes.
- Ricci Chan as Abhie - Matutina's energetic nephew who was hired by Shirley to be their domestic helper.

== Viewership ==
According to Media Pulse Inc. (Pulsitron) in August 24, 1987, John en Marsha was the ninth most watched television program with 21.9 percent rating.

== Awards and nominations ==
Awards and nominations
Year	Award giving body	Category	Nominated work/ Person	Results
1987	PMPC (Philippine Movie Press Club) Star Awards for Television	Best Comedy Actor	Dolphy	Won

== Songs used ==
Aside from "Rubber Ducky" by Quincy Jones, "Don't Stop 'Til You Get Enough" by Michael Jackson and "Ghostbusters" by Ray Parker Jr. was also used.

== See also ==
- List of programs previously broadcast by Radio Philippines Network
- Home Along Da Riles
