= Order of the Golden Heart (Philippines) =

Philippine order

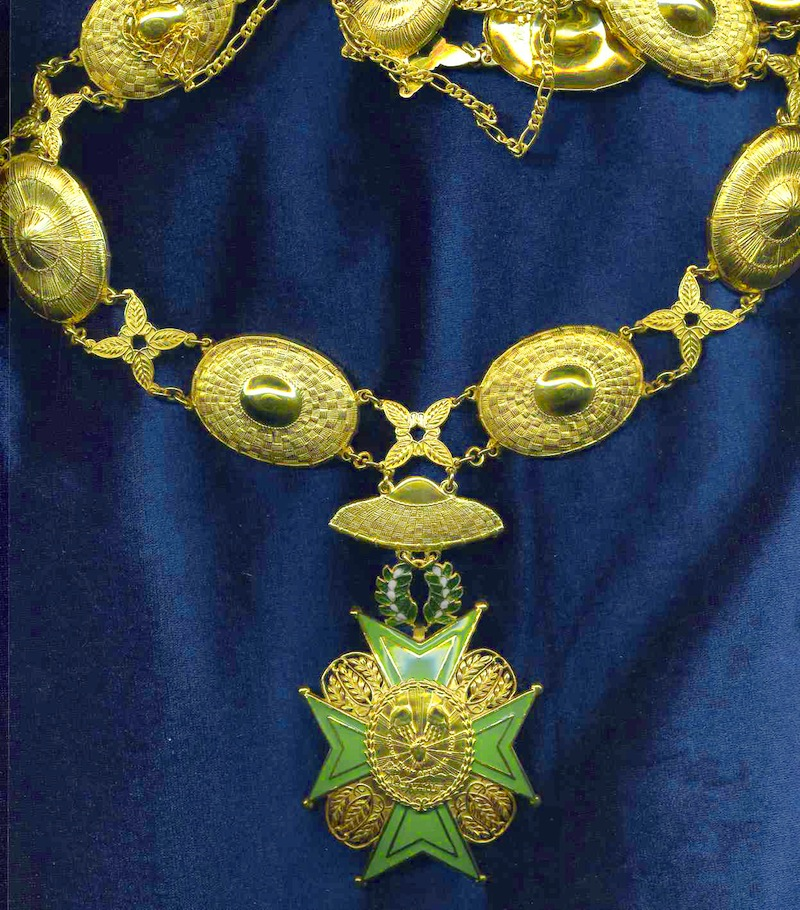
- Grand Collar

Awarded by Philippines
- Type: Order
- Motto: "MANUM TUAM APERVIT INOPE" From Proverbs 31:20 – "She hath opened her heart to the needy and stretched forth her hands to the poor."
- Awarded for: Distinguished services, moral aid, or volunteerism in the service of the Filipino masses
- Status: Currently constituted
- Sovereign: President of Philippines
- Grades: Grand Collar; Grand Cross; Grand Officer; Commander; Officer; Member

Precedence
- Next (higher): Gawad Mabini
- Next (lower): Presidential Medal of Merit
- Ribbon bar of the order

The Order of the Golden Heart (Orden ng Gintong Puso) is an order of the Philippines.

== History ==
Created by Executive Order No. 40-A issued by President Ramon Magsaysay on June 21, 1954, the Golden Heart Presidential Award was upgraded to the Order of the Golden Heart by Executive Order No. 236 issued by President Gloria Macapagal-Arroyo on September 19, 2003.

== Criteria ==
The Order of the Golden Heart gives official recognition to Filipino or foreign citizens who have rendered distinguished services or given noteworthy monetary or other material aid, encouragement to the campaign for the amelioration and improvement of the moral, social, and economic conditions of the Filipino masses, and for volunteerism in the service of the Filipino masses.

== Insignia ==
- The Ribbon of the Order is red. The award had a tricolor blue, white, red ribbon
- The badge and the plaque is a green-enamelled Maltese cross with an oval golden medallion representing hands open to a golden shining heart, surmounted by a reverse motto "MANUM TUAM APERVIT INOPE", the whole medallion surrounded by a green crown of laurel, and between the branches, golden laces and green leaves.
- The badge was originally designed as a medal by Gilbert Perez and later modified into the badge of the Order by Galo Ocampo.

== Ranks ==
The Order of the Golden Heart shall be composed of the following ranks:

- Grand Collar (GCGH) (Maringal na Kuwintas): Conferred upon a former or incumbent head of State and/or of government, see photo.
- Grand Cross (GCrGH) (Maringal na Krus): Conferred upon a Crown Prince, Vice President, Senate President, Speaker of the House, Chief Justice or the equivalent, foreign minister or other official of cabinet rank; or upon an Ambassador, Undersecretary, Assistant Secretary, or other person of a rank similar or equivalent to the foregoing
- Grand Officer (GOGH) (Maringal na Pinuno): Conferred upon a Chargé d'affaires, e.p., Minister, Minister Counselor, Consul General heading a consular post, executive director, or other person of a rank similar or equivalent to the foregoing
- Commander (CGH) (Komandante): Chargé d'affaires, a.i., Counselor, First Secretary, Consul General in the consular section of an Embassy, Consular officer with a personal rank higher than Second Secretary, Director, or other person of a rank similar or equivalent to the foregoing
- Officer (OGH) (Pinuno): Conferred upon a Second Secretary, Consul, assistant director, or other person of a rank similar or equivalent to the foregoing
- Member (MGH) (Kagawad): Conferred upon a Third Secretary, Vice Consul, Attaché, Principal Assistant, or other person of a rank similar or equivalent to the foregoing

Order of the Golden Heart Ribbon Bars
Member	Officer	Commander	Grand Officer	Grand Cross	Grand Collar

== Notable recipients ==
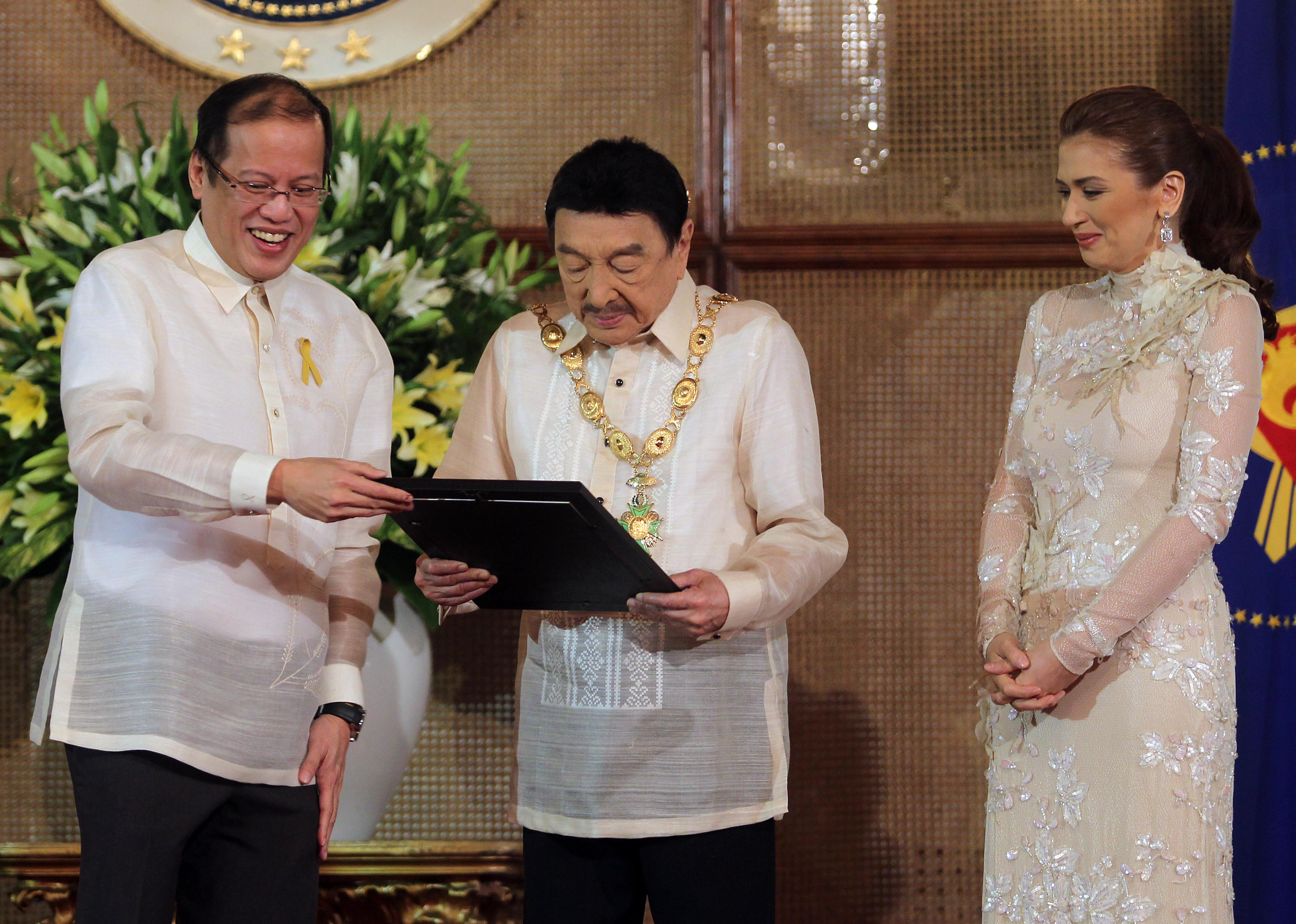
Dolphy was conferred the Order of the Golden Heart with the rank of Grand Collar (Maringal na Kuwintas) by President Benigno Aquino III at the Malacañang Palace in 2010.

The following names were based on the roster of recipients from the Malacañang Protocol Office:

=== Conferred by Ramon Magsaysay ===
- Carlos P. Romulo, Member (Kagawad), September 13, 1954; Grand Cross (Maringal na Krus), 1954
- Helen Keller, Grand Collar (Maringal na Kuwintas), March 20, 1955

=== Conferred by Carlos Garcia ===
- Ramon Magsaysay, Grand Collar (Maringal na Kuwintas), 1958 (posthumous)
- Manuel Quezon, Grand Collar (Maringal na Kuwintas), August 19, 1960 (posthumous)

=== Conferred by Diosdado Macapagal ===
- Queen Sirikit of Thailand, 1963
- Gemma Cruz-Araneta, 1964

=== Conferred by Ferdinand E. Marcos Sr. ===
- Siti Hartinah, Grand Collar (Maringal na Kuwintas), 1968
- Dr. Clark Bloom, Golden Heart Presidential Award, 1971
- Dr. Robert F. Chandler, Grand Cross (Maringal na Krus), 1971
- Queen Ratna, Grand Collar (Maringal na Kuwintas), 1971
- Kwa Geok Choo, Golden Heart Presidential Award, January 15, 1974
- Dr. Charles P. Bailey, Grand Collar (Maringal na Kuwintas), 1975
- Dr. Denton Cooley, Grand Collar (Maringal na Kuwintas), 1975
- Dr. Christiaan Barnard, Grand Collar (Maringal na Kuwintas), 1975
- Cristóbal Martínez-Bordiú, 10th Marquis of Villaverde, Grand Collar (Maringal na Kuwintas), 1975
- Talal bin Abdulaziz, Grand Collar (Maringal na Kuwintas), 1983
- Peace Corps in the Philippines, Golden Heart Presidential Award, 1983
- Imelda Marcos, Grand Collar (Maringal na Kuwintas)
- Suharto, Grand Collar (Maringal na Kuwintas)

=== Conferred by Corazon Aquino ===
- Dr. K. Ramiah, Grand Cross (Maringal na Krus)
- M.S. Swaminathan, Grand Cross (Maringal na Krus), 1987
- Santanina Tillah Rasul, Grand Cross (Maringal na Krus), June 29, 1988

=== Conferred by Fidel Ramos ===
- Fr. Pierre Tritz, SJ, Grand Cross (Maringal na Krus), October 8, 1993
- Manuel Manahan, Grand Cross (Maringal na Krus), April 20, 1994
- Dr. Klaus Lampe, Grand Cross (Maringal na Krus), May 19, 1995
- The Rockefeller Brothers, Grand Cross (Maringal na Krus), August 31, 1996
- Eduardo Ermita, Grand Cross (Maringal na Krus), September 2, 1997
- Fortunato Abat, Grand Cross (Maringal na Krus), September 2, 1997
- Ruben Torres, Grand Cross (Maringal na Krus), September 2, 1997
- Orlando S. Mercado, Grand Cross (Maringal na Krus), May 13, 1998
- Emilia Boncodin, Grand Cross (Maringal na Krus), June 23, 1998
- Gabriel Singson, Grand Cross (Maringal na Krus), June 23, 1998
- Jose T. Almonte, Grand Cross (Maringal na Krus), June 23, 1998
- Juan Flavier, Grand Cross (Maringal na Krus), June 23, 1998
- Magtanggol Gunigundo I, Grand Cross (Maringal na Krus), June 23, 1998
- Manuel Morato, Grand Cross (Maringal na Krus), June 23, 1998
- Manuel Yan, Grand Cross (Maringal na Krus), June 23, 1998
- Renato de Villa, Grand Cross (Maringal na Krus), June 23, 1998
- Santanina Tillah Rasul, Grand Cross (Maringal na Krus), June 23, 1998

=== Conferred by Joseph Ejercito Estrada ===
- Sir Rupert Clarke, Grand Cross (Maringal na Krus), March 9, 1999

=== Conferred by Gloria Macapagal Arroyo ===
- Dr. Jacques Diouf, Grand Cross (Maringal na Krus), April 20, 2004
- Democrito Mendoza, Grand Officer (Maringal na Pinuno), May 1, 2004
- Eulogio R. Lerum, Grand Officer (Maringal na Pinuno), May 1, 2004
- Johnny Tan, Grand Officer (Maringal na Pinuno), May 1, 2004
- Emilio Yap, Grand Cross (Maringal na Krus), February 2, 2005
- Carol Bellamy, Grand Cross (Maringal na Krus), April 5, 2005
- Natividad Relucio-Clavano, Commander (Komandante), August 14, 2006
- Rosa Rosal, Grand Cross (Maringal na Krus), October 26, 2005
- Mohamed Bolkiah, Prince of Brunei, Grand Cross (Maringal na Krus), July 7, 2007
- Al Waleed bin Talal Al Saud, Grand Officer (Maringal na Pinuno), 2007
- Queen Letizia of Spain, Grand Cross (Maringal na Krus), 2007
- Queen Sofía of Spain, Grand Collar (Maringal na Kuwintas), 2007
- Richard Lugar, Grand Cross (Maringal na Krus), 2008
- Daniel Inouye, Grand Cross (Maringal na Krus), 2008
- Ted Stevens, Grand Cross (Maringal na Krus), 2008
- Daniel Akaka, Grand Cross (Maringal na Krus), 2008
- Nancy Pelosi, Grand Cross (Maringal na Krus), 2008
- Harry Reid, Grand Cross (Maringal na Krus), 2008
- Bob Filner, Grand Cross (Maringal na Krus), 2008
- Darrell Issa, Grand Cross (Maringal na Krus), 2008
- Nicholas Alipui, Grand Cross (Maringal na Krus), October 14, 2009
- Joseph R. Pitts, Grand Cross (Maringal na Krus), April 12, 2010
- Madeleine Bordallo, Grand Cross (Maringal na Krus), April 12, 2010
- Archbishop Paciano Aniceto, D.D., Grand Cross (Maringal na Krus), June 1, 2010

=== Conferred by Benigno S. Aquino III ===
- Rodolfo "Dolphy" V. Quizon Sr., Grand Collar (Maringal na Kuwintas), 2010
- Fe del Mundo, Grand Collar (Maringal na Kuwintas), 2011 (posthumous)
- Tsuneo Tanaka, Grand Cross (Maringal na Krus), 2013

=== Conferred by Rodrigo Duterte ===
- Sr. Cecelia Wood, Grand Officer (Maringal na Pinuno), September 27, 2017
- Dr. Rabindra Abeyasinghe, Grand Officer (Maringal na Pinuno), January 22, 2022
