= Dolphy =

Filipino actor and comedian (1928–2012)

Dolphy GCGH
- Dolphy in 1965
- Born: Rodolfo Vera Quizon; July 25, 1928; Tondo, Manila, Philippine Islands
- Died: July 10, 2012 (aged 83); Makati, Philippines
- Resting place: The Heritage Park, Taguig, Philippines
- Children: 18, including Freddie, Rolly, Eric, Epy, Vandolph, and Zia

Comedy career
- Genres: Slapstick comedy; observational comedy; black comedy; satire
- Subjects: Everyday life; Filipino culture
- Occupations: Actor; comedian; producer
- Years active: 1945–2012
- Works: Filmography
- Awards: Full list
- Website: dolphyquizon.com

Rodolfo Vera Quizon Sr. (July 25, 1928 – July 10, 2012), known professionally as Dolphy, was a Filipino comedian and actor. Widely regarded by Philippine media as the country's "King of Comedy" (Filipino: Hari ng Komedya), he starred in a long list of comedy films and television series over a career spanning more than six decades.

Dolphy first gained fame portraying a witty but hapless father figure in the hit sitcom John en Marsha (1973–1978, 1980–1990) and later played the resourceful widower in the long-running series Home Along Da Riles (1992–2003). He received numerous honors for his work, including lifetime achievement awards from Philippine film and television academies. In recognition of his lifetime contributions to entertainment, he was conferred the Grand Collar of the Order of the Golden Heart (GCGH) – the Philippines' highest civilian honor.

== Early life and education ==
Rodolfo Vera Quizon was born along Calle Padre Herrera (now P. Herrera Street) in Tondo, Manila, on July 25, 1928.

His parents were married on July 14, 1925, in Malate, Manila. His father, Melencio Espinosa Quizon (December 1, 1899 – May 14, 1971), was a ship engine worker from Bulacan stationed in the Atlantic Gulf. His mother, Salud de la Rosa Vera (February 6, 1901 – September 12, 1986), was a seamstress and a schoolteacher. He had four brothers and five sisters.

Quizon began studying at the age of six, and was enrolled in public schools. He attended Magat Salamat Elementary School and Isabelo de los Reyes Elementary School until seventh grade. For his secondary education, he studied at the Florentino Torres High School until his sophomore year. He was an average student, although his grades fluctuated.

Quizon sold peanuts and watermelon seeds at movie theaters as a boy, which enabled him to watch movies for free. He was about thirteen when World War II started. He did odd jobs including shining shoes, attaching buttons at a pants factory, sorting bottles by size, working as a stevedore at the pier, trading, and driving a calesa. In his free time, he regularly watched stage shows at the Life Theater and the Avenue Theater. His favorite performers included the comedy duo Pugo and Togo and the dancers Benny Mack and Bayani Casimiro.

Quizon started performing onstage during the Japanese occupation of the Philippines. When he turned 17, Benny Mack got him a job as a chorus dancer for a month at the Avenue Theater and subsequently, the Lyric Theater. He also appeared in shows at the Orient Theater. "Golay" was his first stage name. During air raids, they would interrupt the show and run for the air-raid shelter in the orchestra pit together with the audience. If no bombs fell and exploded, the show would resume.

== Career ==
=== Early career ===
He starred in his first film when he was 19 with Fernando Poe Sr. in Dugo at Bayan (I Remember Bataan), billed as "Rodolfo Quizon". It was the father of his future friend, actor Fernando Poe Jr., who first gave him a break in films playing minor roles as a character actor. In a DZMM radio interview, he revealed his first talent fee was ₱5.

In the late 1940s, Dolphy began to work in radio through Conde Ubaldo, a radio writer, director, and producer. He joined the program Wag Naman, which starred Pancho Magalona, Tessie Quintana, and Baby Jane. His comedy duo with Panchito also started on radio on Conde Ubaldo shows.

Magalona recommended Dolphy to José Roxas Perez, the owner of Sampaguita Pictures, in 1952. His first movie with Sampaguita was Sa Isang Sulyap Mo, Tita, with Magalona and Tita Duran. It was also in Sampaguita in which the comedy duo of Dolphy and Panchito became popular.

Dolphy acted in the comic book adaptation Jack en Jill with Rogelio de la Rosa and Lolita Rodriguez in 1954. He was not the first choice for the role, for which Batotoy and Bayani Casimiro had been considered. Dolphy said the movie established him as an actor, because he played a gay character, when they were not recognized.

The first time Dolphy played a serious role was in a 4-in-1 drama movie with Barbara Perez, who played a blind girl, in the segment inspired by Charlie Chaplin's movie City Lights.

After his contract with Sampaguita expired, he left the company. When he joined the production studio, his talent fee was ₱1,000 per film. By the time he left, he was earning ₱7,000 per picture.

=== Television, film parodies, and RVQ Productions ===
Dolphy acted in Tansan The Mighty (1962), and its sequel Tansan vs Tarzan (1963).

From 1964 to 1972, he starred in Buhay Artista, a big success of the 1960s. Eugenio "Geny" López Jr. got him into television on Channel 2, and the show aired on ABS-CBN. It is a concept by López and Ading Fernando. While doing radio, his talent fee was ₱250-₱300 per program; when he did television, he was at ₱500 per show. He left ABS-CBN when it was shuttered following the proclamation of Martial Law in September 1972, moving to GMA Network since Buhay Artista moved to RBS-7 (former name of GMA) from December 1972 to early 1974.

While on television, he began appearing in films for independent studios like LEA Productions, Balatbat Productions, Filipinas Productions, Zultana Productions and Fernando Poe Jr.'s D'Lanor Productions.

In 1964, he played the lead in Captain Barbell and in Daigdig ng Fantasia (Fantasy World) with Nova Villa. Both films were directed by Herminio "Butch" Bautista.

From 1965 to 1966, Dolphy made a minimum of 15 spy film parodies. Also in 1966, Dolphy starred in another 19 parody films.

For the 1966 film Pepe en Pilar, Dolphy introduced Ronaldo Valdez to Susan Roces, as a new face was needed as a partner for Roces. Dolphy first met Valdez in a basketball court and brought him to the press conference so Roces could see him. Roces' initial response was "He is too young". Dolphy brought Ronaldo to a barber shop, bought him a pair of boots at Glenmore and lent him his suit. When Dolphy presented him to Roces again, she said, "I prefer him now", not realizing that he was the same person he had introduced earlier. Dolphy later gave him the stage name "Ronaldo Valdez" (real name: Ronald James Gibbs).

By 1967, Dolphy's production house RVQ Productions was established. Dolphy explained that when Sampaguita closed he thought he should produce his own films. He started with a film adaptation of the sitcom Buhay Artista (Actor's Life), a box office success.

In 1969, one of his biggest hits was Facifica Falayfay, where he starred as the gay lead character. It was directed by Luciano "Chaning" Carlos, with whom he worked in 23 of his movies. Also in that year, he starred in Adolphong Hitler.

John en Marsha started in 1971, a year before the declaration of Martial Law, on RPN Channel 9. It was written, and directed by Ading Fernando. Boots Anson-Roa and Helen Gamboa were considered for the role of Marsha, his wife in the show before Nida Blanca, who was doing Wala Kang Paki with Nestor de Villa, eventually got the part. Before Dely Atay-Atayan, Chichay was also considered for the role of Doña Delilah, his wealthy and condescending mother-in-law. His real son Rolly Quizon and then-child actress Maricel Soriano played their children. John en Marsha was such a hit that movie versions of the show were made eight times.

In 1973, Fefita Fofongay viuda de Falayfay was released, a sequel to Facifica Falayfay. That same year Dolphy acted in Captain Barbell's sequel Captain Barbell Boom!

In 1974, a third instalment of Facifica Falayfay was released called Sarhento Fofongay: A ... ewan!

In 1978, he returned to gay roles in the movie Ang Tatay Kong Nanay (My Father that is also a Mother), directed by respected Lino Brocka. With him in the movie was Niño Muhlach, dubbed as the "child wonder of the Philippines", as the son of his boyfriend, played by Phillip Salvador.

In 1979, Dolphy starred in Dancing Master and Darna... Kuno?

The spy-spoof film The Quick Brown Fox, was released on November 6, 1980. In it Dolphy plays the lead and it is his first collaboration with Weng Weng. That year, Dolphy acted in the Dancing Master follow-up Superhand: Shadow of the Dancing Master and Dolphy's Angels.

In 1981, Dolphy starred in Stariray, Da Best In Da West, and Dancing Masters 2. That year Dolphy acted in Agent 00, starring Weng Weng.

=== 1992–2012: Later works, honors and final years ===
The Home Along Da Riles was one of the Philippines' longest running shows of all time.

His next successful TV venture after John en Marsha was Home Along Da Riles in 1992 with Nova Villa, as his wife and real son Vandolph, as one of his children. Dolphy also appeared in a number of comedy film productions at the time, one of them being Tataynic, a 1998 parody film made to cash in on the success of the James Cameron disaster epic Titanic.

In 2001, Dolphy played another gay character, this time with his sons Eric Quizon and Jeffrey Quizon playing the same character at three different stages in life. They all won the Prix de la Meilleure Interpretation in Brussels, Belgium for playing Walterina Markova, a transvestite in the movie Markova: Comfort Gay.

In 2003, the sitcom Home Along Da Riles returned as Home Along Da Airport. In 2006, the sitcom John en Shirley, a spinoff and sequel series to John en Marsha was released, with Dolphy and Maricel Soriano reprising their roles.

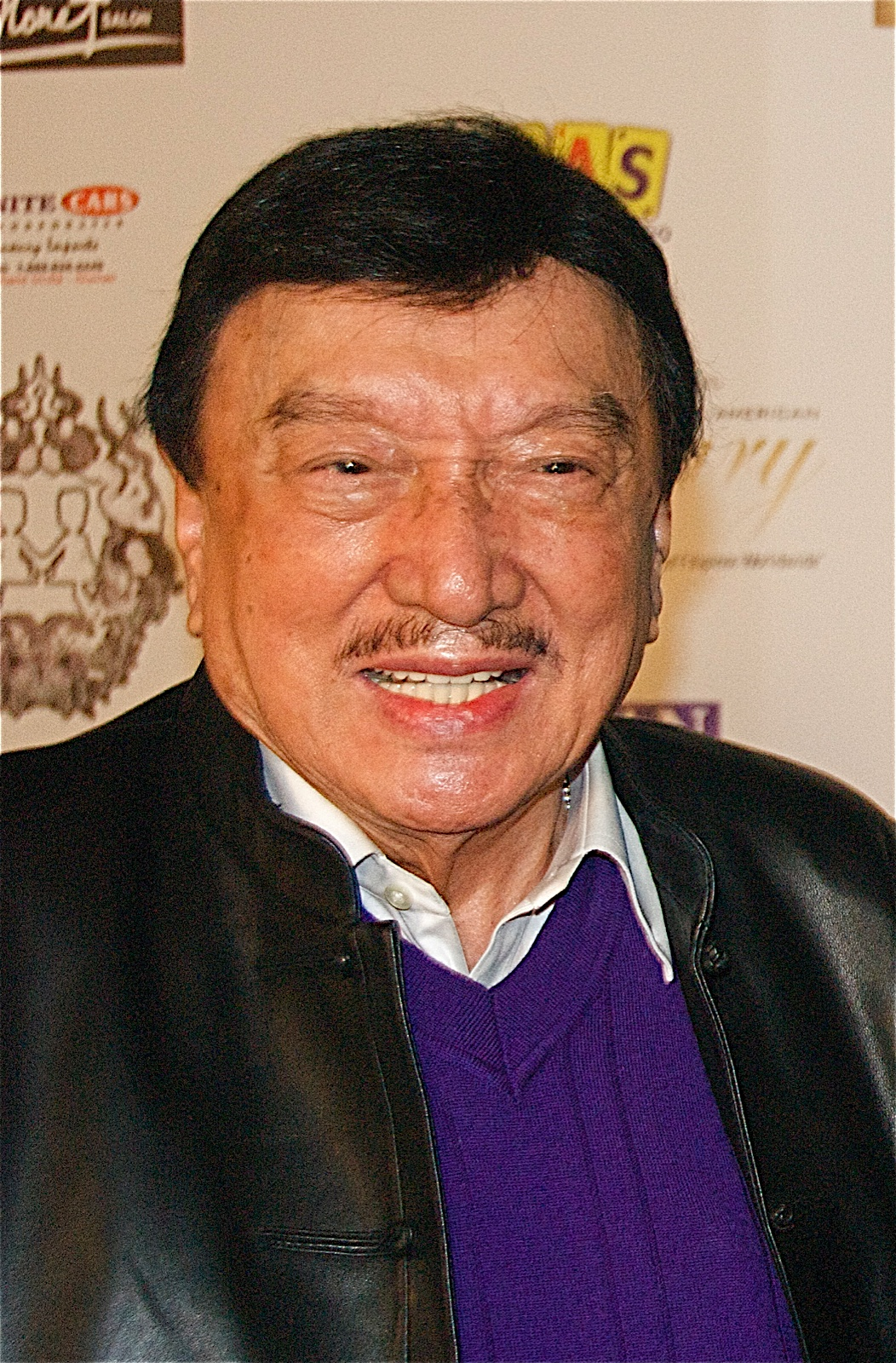
Dolphy in 2008

On July 25, 2008, Quizon celebrated his 80th birthday with the launching of a biographical book, Dolphy, Hindi Ko Ito Narating Mag-isa (Dolphy, I Didn't Get Here All By Myself). ABS-CBN President Charo Santos-Concio stated, Nagbigay siya ng mga ngiti at halakhak sa gitna ng mga problema (He gave us joy and laughter in times of trouble). Bibeth Orteza was commissioned to complete the book, amid the creation of "Dolphy Aid Para sa Pinoy Foundation, Inc.", a non-profit and non-stock organization. Also that year, Dolphy made a movie with Comedy Box Office King Vic Sotto in a comedy movie, Dobol Trobol, a movie where Dolphy played a chef and Vic a hotel resident manager. This was the first time a film was produced through joint ventures of RVQ Productions (Dolphy's Film Outfit) & M-Zet Films (Vic Sotto's Film Outfit) and APT Entertainment. The film also featured stars Carmi Martin, Riza Santos, Jose Manalo, Wally Bayola, Ricky Davao and more.

In 2009, Dolphy was cast as a retired senior citizen in Chicago who wanted to watch Wowowee in Manila entitled Nobody Nobody But... Juan, and co-starred with Eddie "Manoy" Garcia, Gloria Romero, Joe Aldeguer, Pokwang, Giselle "G" Toengi, Heart Evangelista, Ya Chang, real life sons Eric Quizon, Jeffrey "Epi" Quizon & Vandolph Quizon. Also in 2009, Dolphy was nominated to receive the Order of National Artists, "the highest national recognition given to Filipino individuals who have made significant contributions to the development of Philippine arts". However, he did not pass the second deliberation of the screening committee. In 2012, Dolphy was diagnosed with chronic obstructive pulmonary disease. As a result, his public appearances were reduced, and he was frequently admitted to the intensive care unit.

In 2010, Dolphy played a priest in his last movie in Father Jejemon, with his co-stars Cherrie Gil, Roy Alvarez, Maja Salvador, EJ Falcon, singer Ralph Salazar & YouTube singing duo Moymoy Palaboy. That same year, President Benigno Aquino III said he believes the late Comedy King deserves to be conferred the National Artist award but stressed he cannot shortcut the process for legal reasons. Since there is a temporary restraining order on the conferment of the National Artist title issued during the past administration, President Aquino conferred to Dolphy the Order of the Golden Heart, with the rank of Grand Collar (Maringal na Kuwintas). Also that year, Dolphy was recognized as Outstanding Manilan by the Manila City Government.

In 2012, he was given the Diwa ng Lahi award in 2012, given by City Hall in celebration of the city's founding anniversary. He died later that year.

=== Posthumous honors ===
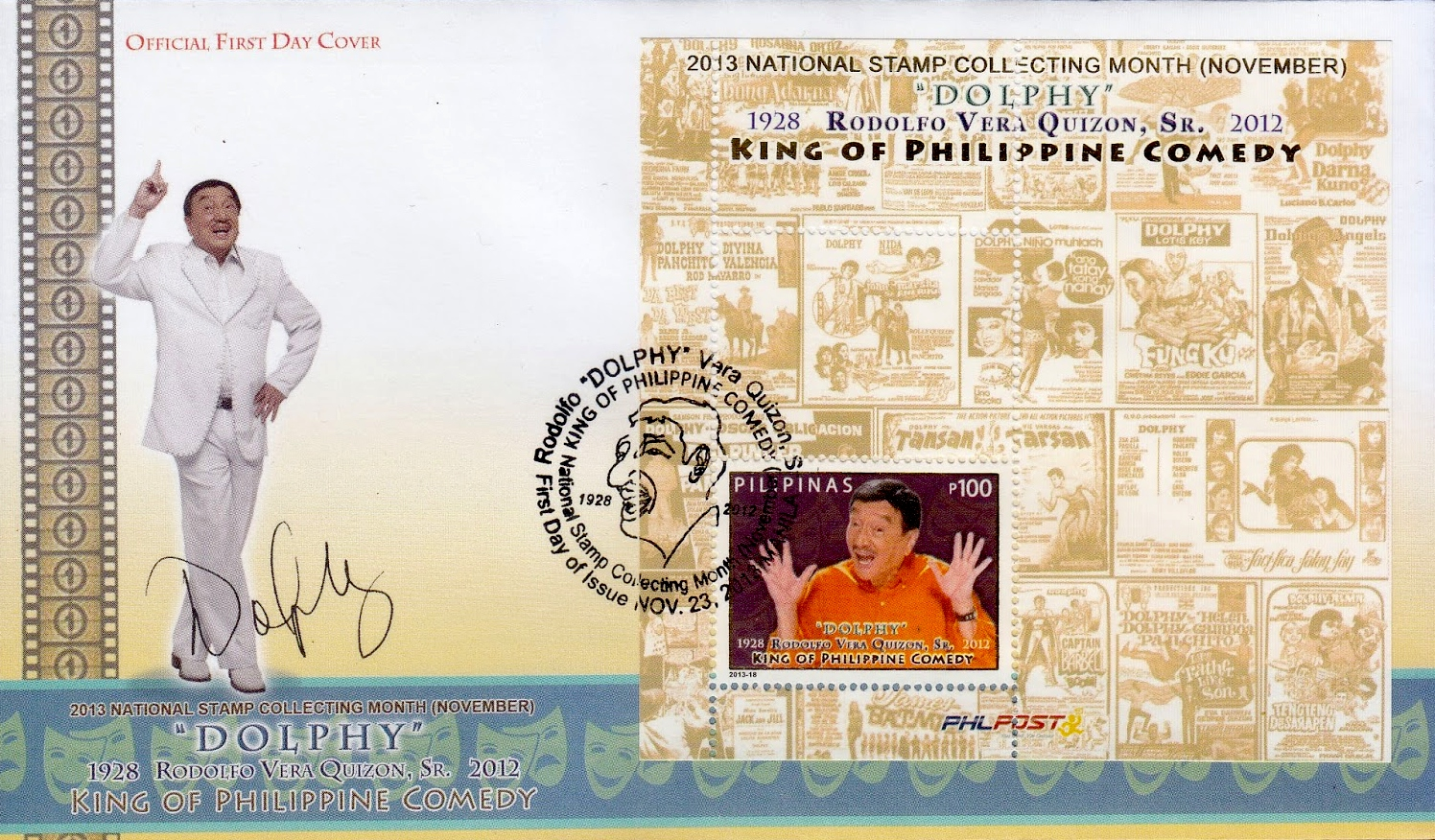
Dolphy's 2013 commemorative first day cover and stamp

After his death, on July 13, 2012, President Aquino declared a "National Day of Remembrance" in honor of Dolphy's contributions to the Philippine showbiz industry.

During his wake at the Heritage Park in Taguig, fellow actor and former Philippine President Joseph Estrada bestowed the 2012 People's Artist Award on him to recognize Quizon's many contributions to the movie industry. On November 23, 2013, Philippine Postal Corporation (PHLPost) released a limited edition "Dolphy Stamp", and first day cover. A mobile app entitled Dolphy's Cleanup was released in honor of Quizon in December 2013 for the iOS platform, with a port for Android devices released in 2014. The edutainment game, developed by iGen Technologies, puts players in the role of Dolphy as he helps clean up the neighborhood, with part of the revenue from the game's sales to be donated to charity. Also that year, the documentary film The Search for Weng Weng was released. In it, Quizon is interviewed about his former colleague.

On July 25, 2020, Google celebrated his 92nd birthday with a Google Doodle.

Araneta also noted that Dolphy grew up in Manila, where he began his showbiz career as a dancer at the Avenue, Lyric and Orient theaters.

ABS-CBN Studio 1, one of the oldest studio of ABS-CBN was transformed into a proscenium theater and was named in honor of Dolphy on his 80th birthday in 2008. A necrological service was held in the namesake theatre for Dolphy at the time of his death.

== Personal life ==
=== Relationships ===
Quizon never married and was public with his relationships and family. He has 18 children from six relationships. In his autobiography, he mentioned that he had five relationships before Zsa Zsa Padilla that bore children, the last being Alma Moreno. Some of his children followed their father's footsteps in showbiz.

- Engracita Dominguez (actress). They met during a stage show and had six children: Manuel (b. 1951), Salud (b. 1954), Rodolfo Jr. (b. 1955), Wilfredo (1956–2005), Edgar (1957–2020), and Raul (1958–2018). They separated in 1963.
- Gloria Smith (actress). They met in 1956 and had four children: Mariquita (b. 1962), Carlos (b. 1965), Geraldino (1972–2018), and Edwin (b. 1975).
- Alice Smith (actress with screen name Pamela Ponti). They had four children: Ronaldo (b. 1965), Enrico (b. 1967), Madonna (b. 1971), and Jeffrey (b. 1973).
- Evangeline Tagulao (nurse). They met in the late 1960s while filming in a hospital and had one son, Rommel (born 1968).
- Venesa Lacsamana (actress with screen name Alma Moreno). They met in 1981 and had one son, Vandolph (born 1984).
- Zsa Zsa Padilla (actress and singer). For more than 20 years, he was in a domestic partnership with Padilla, having two daughters, Nicole (legally adopted 1990) and Zia (born 1991). Nicole is the only legitimate child of Dolphy as the rest were born out of wedlock.

=== Religion ===
Quizon was a devout Catholic throughout his life and occasionally attended Mass. He also practiced various Catholic rituals, including praying the rosary or observing Holy Week (i.e. Visita Iglesia on Maundy Thursday and abstaining from meat on Good Friday), and would make the sign of the cross when he would pass a Catholic church. Two of Quizon's children are born-again Christians who unsuccessfully attempted to convert him. He declined, but was respectful towards their Evangelical beliefs.

=== Politics ===
Quizon was quite involved into politics throughout his acting career, but had tried to distance himself from it. He had said that he would likely start a blog if only he were literate in browsing the Internet. He had high regards with the presidency of Corazon Aquino, referring to her as an "asset" for the Filipinos. He declined to enter politics despite repeated entreaties to do so.

He supported Fernando Poe Jr. (1939–2004), whose father, Fernando Poe Sr. (d. 1951), was a close friend of his, during his presidential campaign in 2004. After Poe had suffered a stroke (which would later claim his life), Quizon visited him during his confinement and assured him and his wife, Susan Roces, that he indeed had won the presidential race, despite losing it to Gloria Macapagal Arroyo.

== Health problems and death ==
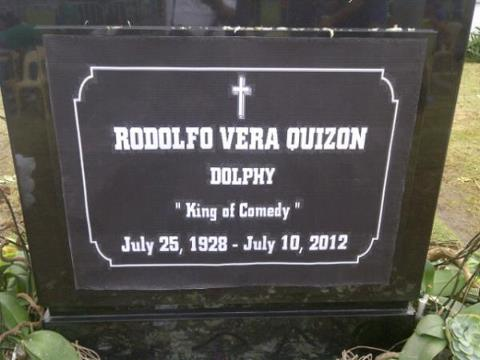
Dolphy's tomb at The Heritage Park in Taguig

Dolphy died on July 10, 2012, 20:34 (Philippine time, 12:34 UTC), at the age of 83, just 15 days before his 84th birthday due to multiple organ failure, secondary to complications brought on by pneumonia, chronic obstructive pulmonary disease and acute renal failure at Makati Medical Center.

While several of Dolphy's relatives were buried at the Quizon Family mausoleum in Loyola Memorial Park in Marikina (which includes his parents, Salud and Melencio; his siblings Melencio Jr. and Teresita; his son Wilfredo; and another relative, Orlando Gallardo), he himself was buried elsewhere. (The Heritage Park in Fort Bonifacio, Taguig) His tomb is currently restored.

== Acting credits and accolades ==
Dolphy's conferment of the Order of the Golden Heart at the Malacañang Palace in 2010.

- : Order of the Golden Heart, Maringal na Kuwintas (Grand Collar) - (2010)
- Lifetime Achievement Award PASADO Awards
- Golden Father Foundation Parangal ng Bayan Awardee
- 1994 Bert Marcelo Memorial Foundation, Dangal ng Lipi Awardee
- 1995 PMPC Star Awards for TV, Lifetime Achievement Award
- 1998 Gawad Urian Awards, Lifetime Achievement Award
- 2000 Cinemanila International Film Festival, Lifetime Achievement Award
- 2002 Lou Salvador Sr. Memorial Award, Bituin ng FAMAS Mula Noon Hanggang Ngayon Award
- 2005 FAMAS Huwarang Bituin
- 2009 GMMSF Box-Office Entertainment Awards, Comedy Box-Office King (with Vic Sotto)
- 2009 Metro Manila Film Festival Lifetime Achievement Award
- 2010 FAMAS Awards, Exemplary Achievement Award
- 2010 Grand Collar of the Order of the Golden Heart – the highest award given to a private citizen by the President of the Philippines. Dolphy was cited for his contributions to the entertainment industry and for his charitable and philanthropic works.
- 2012 Gawad na Diwa ng Lahi – the highest honor given by the government of Manila to artists
- 2012 People's Artist Award – the award bestowed posthumously upon Dolphy by the Dakilang Lahi Foundation, recognizes the many contributions of the actor to the movie industry.

=== Awards for acting ===
Year	Association	Category
1974	Metro Manila Film Festival	Best Actor
1978	26th FAMAS Awards	Best Actor – Omeng Satanasia
1986	PMPC Star Awards for TV	Best Comedy Actor – John En Marsha
1987	PMPC Star Awards for TV	Best Comedy Actor – John En Marsha
1988	PMPC Star Awards for TV	Best Comedy Actor – John En Marsha
1990	Metro Manila Film Festival	Best Actor – Espadang Patpat
1990	PMPC Star Awards for TV	Best Comedy Actor – John En Marsha
1992	PMPC Star Awards for TV	Best Comedy Actor – Home Along Da Riles
1993	PMPC Star Awards for TV	Best Comedy Actor – Home Along Da Riles
1994	PMPC Star Awards for TV	Best Comedy Actor – Home Along Da Riles
1995	PMPC Star Awards for TV	Best Comedy Actor – Home Along Da Riles
2008	PMPC Star Awards for TV	Best Comedy Actor – John En Shirley
2010	Metro Manila Film Festival	Best Supporting Actor – Rosario
2010	Metro Manila Film Festival	Best Actor – Father Jejemon
2011	Luna Awards (Film Academy of the Phil.)	Best Actor – Father Jejemon

He is also the only artist in the country awarded with Best Actor and Actress for a single role in the film Markova: The Comfort Gay.

- Not all the awards of Dolphy are included here.

== See also ==
- Dolphy Theatre – A theatre named in his honor

== Works cited ==
- Orteza, Bibeth (2009). Dolphy: Hindi Ko Ito Narating Mag-isa (in Filipino). Quezon City, Philippines: Kaizz Ventures, Inc. ISBN 978-971-941-55-0-3.
- Leavold, Andrew. The Search for Weng Weng (2017). Australia: The LedaTape Organisation, 2017. ISBN 9780994411235
