= Nova Villa =

Filipino actress and comedian

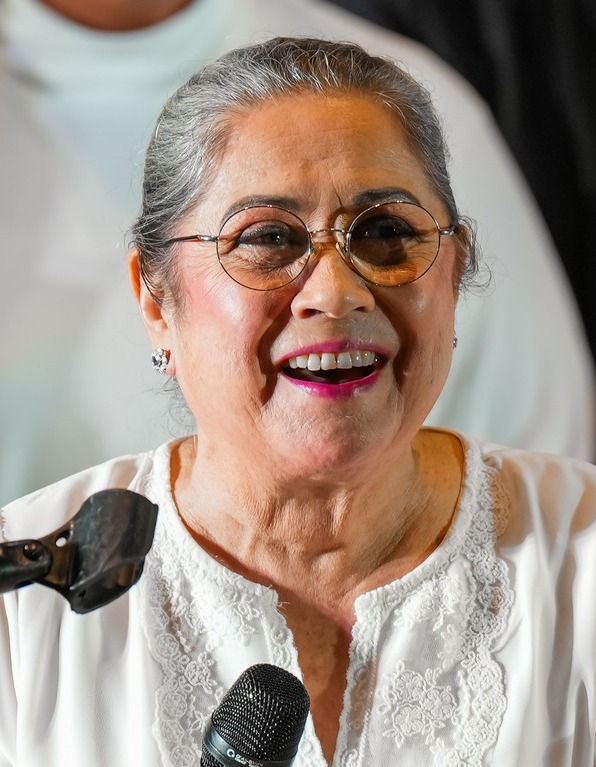
- Villa in 2023
- Born: Novelita Acosta Villanueva; April 16, 1946 (age 80); Quezon City, Philippine Commonwealth
- Occupations: Actress; comedian
- Years active: 1960–present
- Agent(s): ABS-CBN (1987–2010); TV5 (2008–2011); GMA Network (2011-present)
- Spouse: Freddie Gallegos
- Relatives: Tiya Pusit (half-sister)

Novelita Acosta Villanueva Gallegos (born April 16, 1946), known professionally as Nova Villa, is a Filipino actress and comedian. Known primarily as the "Goddess of Comedy", she is regarded as one of the pillars in Philippine entertainment and is celebrated as one of the greatest Filipino comedians of all time. She has since appeared in over 150 films and has been prominent in situational comedies such as Chicks to Chicks (1971–1991), Home Along Da Riles (1992–2003) and Pepito Manaloto (2010–present).

Among her many accolades includes the "Pro Ecclesia et Pontifice medal" bestowed by Pope Francis, the highest papal award the Vatican can give a layperson. She is the third actress with the most wins (4) at the PMPC Star Awards for TV in the "Best Comedy Actress" category. She was also honored with the Ading Fernando Lifetime Achievement Award, Manuel de Leon Award for Exemplary Achievement at the 37th Luna Awards, and the Helen Vela Lifetime Achievement Award for Comedy at the 2012 Golden Screen TV Awards.

== Career ==
=== Film career ===
In 2024, Villanueva shared on Lutong Bahay that she began her showbiz career after being discovered by the late Fernando Poe Jr.. According to Villa, she was 17 years old when her neighbor, comedian Chichay of Sampaguita Pictures, brought her to Premiere Productions in the 1960s. While waiting in the canteen, she noticed Poe arriving in a white Cadillac and was immediately captivated by him. Poe's production manager, Ben Esteva, later approached Villanueva and asked if she wanted to become an actress. After she accepted, she was instructed to report for a film shoot the next day. Fellow actress Dang Cruz revealed that Villanueva eventually became Poe's leading lady in one of his projects. In a 2023 interview, Villanueva described Poe as her favorite leading man. In May, she received the Iconic Movie Actress of Philippine Cinema award at the FAMAS Awards. Villanueva has also appeared in several GMA Network's programs, including Pepito Manaloto (2012–present), Inday Will Always Love You (2018), and Mulawin vs. Ravena (2017).

=== Radio broadcasting ===
Apart from acting, Villanueva also worked as a broadcaster at Radio Veritas for 14 years. She served as co-host of the station's radio program Breakfast with Tabuneknek alongside Orly Punzalan beginning in 1978. Villanueva stated in February 1986 that she decided against receiving any salary for her radio work at Radio Veritas, with her belief that people in the entertainment industry should alot "a little of our time to help nurture good values among Filipinos."

== Political views ==
During the 1986 snap presidential election, Villanueva regularly campaigned for the reelection of president Ferdinand Marcos under Kilusang Bagong Lipunan, alongside other film industry personalities. However, soon after the election, she shared to WE Forum that she changed her mind on Marcos, stating that "I've been campaigning for the KBL and I've been joining them in rallies but I thought that God must help me decide. And I am glad He gave me enlightenment."

== Personal life ==
Villanueva's half-sister is Myrna Villanueva, also an actress and comedian better known by her screen name Tiya Pusit. Villanueva is a caregiver for her husband Freddie Gallegos who remains bedridden since his 2017 stroke.

== Filmography ==
=== Film ===
Year	Title	Role	Ref.
1960	Manananggal vs Mangkukulam	—	
1964	Ang Mahiwagang Pag-Ibig ni Lola Cinderella	—	
1964	Daniel Barrion	—	
1964	Baril Na Ginto	—	
1964	Maskarados	—	
1964	Sa Daigdig ng Fantasia	—	
1965	Alyas Batman at Robin	—	
1965	Captain Philippines at Boy Pinoy	—	
1965	Scarface at Al Capone: Espiya sa Ginto	—	
1965	Pilipinas Kong Mahal	—	
1966	Alyas Phantom	—	
1966	Swanie	—	
1966	Sa Bawat Lansagan	—	
1967	Ex-Convict	—	
1968	Manila, Open City	young Girl	
1968	Artista ang Aking Asawa	—	
1968	Alipin ng Busabos	—	
1969	9 Teeners	—	
1969	Batang Palengke	—	
1969	Young Girl	—	
1969	Banda 24	—	
1969	Stop, Look, Listen	—	
1969	Agent 7: Our Man Duling	—	
1969	Mga Alabastro	—	
1969	Zatoduling (The Cross-Eyed Swordsman)	—	
1971	Laff Story	—	
1972	Boy Galawgaw	—	
1972	Diamonds Are for Eva	—	
1972	Laug Bag	—	
1973	May Isang Brilyante	—	
1973	Inday ng Buhay Ko	—	
1973	Ito ang Tunay Na Lalaki	—	
1974	Enkantadang Payong	—	
1974	Carnival Song	—	
1975	Loose Connections	—	
1975	Batu-Bato sa Langit (Ang Tamaa'y Huwag Magagalit)	Noviciada Carcomonia	
1976	Boss, Basta Ikaw (Wa' Na 'Kong Sey)	—	
1976	Wanted... Ded or Alayb (Agad-agad)	—	
1977	Masikip Maluwang Paraisong Parisukat	—	
1978	Dyesebel	Bengenge	
1979	Pinay, American Style	—	
1980	Iniibig Ko'y... Nakatali	—	
1981	P.S. I Love You	Vicky	
1981	Rocky Tu-log	—	
1981	Mister Kwekong (Driver ng Punerarya)	—	
1982	Si Ako at... Tres Muskiteros!	Ines	
1982	Forgive and Forget	Irene	
1982	Annie Sabungera	—	
1983	Buhay-Misis	—	
1985	Magchumikap Ka!	—	
1985	Tender Age	—	
1985	Ano Ka, Hilo?	—	
1985	S.W.A.K.: Samahang Walang Atrasan sa Kalaban	—	
1986	Rocky Four-ma	—	
1986	Captain Barbell	Aling Tinay	
1986	Payaso	—	
1987	Ako si Kiko, Ako si Kikay	Susana	
1988	Leroy Leroy Sinta	—	
1988	Taray at Teroy	Cora	
1988	Super Inday and the Golden Bibe	Inda	
1988	Love Letters	—	
1988	I Love You 3x a Day	Saucy Matukoy	
1988	Bakit Kinagat ni Adan ang Mansanas ni Eba?	Luming	
1989	Mars Ravelo's Bondying: The Little Big Boy	Luding	
1989	Pulis, Pulis sa Ilalim ng Tulay	Wendy	
1989	Gawa Na ang Bala para sa Akin	Lita	
1989	Hotdog	Kristine	
1990	Twist: Ako si Ikaw, Ikaw si Ako	Daniela	
1990	Tora Tora, Bang Bang Bang	Luningning	
1990	Michael and Madonna	Cindy	
1990	Pido Dida: Sabay Tayo	Akang	
1990	Samson & Goliath	Madam Loli	
1991	Pido Dida 2 (Kasal Na)	Akang	
1991	Eh, Kasi Bisaya	—	
1991	Okay Ka, Fairy Ko!: The Movie	Alfonso's wife	
1992	Si Lucio at si Miguel: Hihintayin Kayo sa Langit	Meldie	
1992	Eh, Kasi Bata	Meldie	
1993	Pido Dida 3: May Kambal Na	Akang	
1993	Home Along da Riles: Da Movie	Azon Madamba	
1994	Hindi Pa Tapos ang Labada, Darling	Trixie	
1994	Si Ayala at Si Zobel	Lilit	
1997	Home Along da Riles 2	Azon Madamba	
1997	Wanted: Perfect Murder!	Mrs. Reyes	
1997	Kokey	Mrs. Querubin	
1999	Basta Ikaw... Nanginginig Pa!	Ason Madamba	
2004	So... Happy Together	Inday	
2005	Happily Ever After	—	
2005	Dreamboy	Mai	
2005	Hari ng Sablay: Isang Tama, Sampung Mali	Lola Gracia	
2006	Close to You	Lola Dading	
2007	Desperadas	Margot	
2008	Dayo: Sa Mundo ng Elementalia	Lola Nita (voice role)	
2008	Desperadas 2	Margot	
2009	Oh, My Girl! A Laugh Story...	Sita	
2012	Every Breath U Take	Lola Pilar	
2012	The Reunion	Manang	
2012	Sosy Problems	Patria	
2013	Raketeros	—	
2013	Kung Fu Divas	San-ing's mother	
2014	1st Ko si 3rd	Cory	
2015	All You Need Is Pag-ibig	Loisa	
2016	This Time	Ophelia	
2018	Miss Granny	Feliza "Fely" Malabaño / Miss Granny	
2019	S.O.N.S: Sons of Nanay Sabel	Queen Gracia of Ulteria	
2022	Labyu with an Accent	Lola Tare	
2024	Senior Moments	—	
2025	Everything About My Wife	Lola Yogi	
2026	Home Along Da Riles: Da Reunion	Azon Madamba	

=== Television ===
Year	Title	Role	Ref.
1969–1972	Super Laff-In	Herself	
1974–1976	Baltic & Co.	—	
1979–1987	Chicks to Chicks	Ines Capistrano	
1987–1991	Chika Chika Chicks	Ines Capistrano	
1987–1992	Palibhasa Lalake	Celestina "Tinay" Segundo	
1989–1995	Eat Bulaga!	Co-host	
1991–1997	Abangan Ang Susunod Na Kabanata	Tita Delos Santos	
1992	Mana-Mana	—	
1992	The Maricel Drama Special	Various Roles	
1992–2003	Home Along Da Riles	Azon Madamba	
1997–2001	Kaya ni Mister, Kaya ni Misis	Goring Magtanggol	
2001–2003	Eto Na Ang Susunod Na Kabanata	Tita Delos Santos	
2003–2005	Home Along Da Airport	Azon Madamba	
2004	Mangarap Ka	Zoila Catacutan	
2006–2007	Super Inggo	Lola Juaning	
2007	That's My Doc	Octavella "Tita Oc" Flores	
2007	Your Song: Never Knew Love Like This Before	Janet	
2007	Kokey	Sor Aida Sanchez	
2007	Super Inggo 1.5: Ang Bagong Bangis	Lola Juaning	
2008–2010	Everybody Hapi	Various	
2009	Agimat: Ang Mga Alamat ni Ramon Revilla: Tiagong Akyat	Martha	
2010	Kokey @ Ako	Sor Aida Sanchez	
2010	Hapi-er Together	Nympha Cayugyog	
2010–2011	My Driver Sweet Lover	Aling White	
2011	Luv Crazy	Various	
2011	Nita Negrita	Nana Ima	
2011	Futbolilits	Lola Ester Cortes	
2011	Sugod Mga Kapatid	Mommy Gabby	
2012	My Beloved	Lola Inggay Castor	
2012	Tweets for My Sweet	Domina delos Santos	
2012–2013	Aso ni San Roque	Ofelia Sandoval	
2012	Magpakailanman: The Ryzza Mae Dizon Story	Lola Ester	
2012–present	Pepito Manaloto	Mimosa "Mimi" Kho	
2013	Binoy Henyo	Lola Chato	
2013	Magpakailanman: Ang Nag-iisang Kontrabida ng Buhay Ko: The Rez and Candy Cortez Story	Mommy	
2013	Wagas: The Amy Silvosa and Orly Escovido Love Story	Amy	
2013	Magpakailanman: Kislap ng Parol	Erlinda	
2014	Vampire ang Daddy Ko	Meme	
2014	Kambal Sirena	Ligaya Natividad	
2015	Once Upon a Kiss	Adela Rodrigo	
2015	Yagit	Adelaida	
2015	Marimar	Lola Cruz Perez	
2015	Magpakailanman: SaveTheMaid	Manang Hermy	
2016	Dear Uge	Esther	
2016	Sa Piling ni Nanay	Doña Matilda Mercado	
2017	Destined to be Yours	Purissima "Nana Puring" Melendez	
2017	Mulawin vs. Ravena	Consuelo "Elo" Manalastas	
2018	Inday Will Always Love You	Loleng Magtibay	
2019	Love You Two	Gloria	
2021	Owe My Love	Epifania "Mema Eps" delos Santos-Guipit	
2022	False Positive	Mamerta "Mema" Ramirez	
2023	AraBella	Lola Madonna	
2023	It's Showtime	Herself (guest)	
2023–2024	Can't Buy Me Love	Salvacion "Lola Nene" Rivera	
2025	Incognito	Sara	
2025–2026	Sanggang-Dikit FR	Isang	
2025	Tropang G.O.A.T.	Lola Uray	

== Awards and nominations ==
Year	Award-giving body	Category	Nominated work	Result	Ref.
1987	PMPC Star Award	Best Comedy Actress	Chika Chika Chiks	Won	
1991	PMPC Star Award	Best Comedy Actress	Abangan Ang Susunod Na Kabanata	Won	
1998	PMPC Star Award	Best Comedy Actress	Home Along Da Riles	Won	
2012	Golden Screen TV Awards	Helen Vela Lifetime Achievement Award for Comedy	—N/a	Won	
2013	Golden Screen TV Awards	Outstanding Supporting Actress in a Gag or Comedy Program	Tweets for My Sweet	Nominated	
2014	Golden Screen TV Awards	Outstanding Supporting Actress in a Gag or Comedy Program	Pepito Manaloto	Won	
2014	28th Star Awards for Television	Best Comedy Actress	Pepito Manaloto	Nominated	
2014	28th Star Awards for Television	Ading Fernando Lifetime Achievement Award	—N/a	Won	
2015	Gawad Urian Awards	Best Actress	Pinakamahusay na Pangunahing Aktres; 1st Ko Si 3rd	Nominated	
2015	2015 Metro Manila Film Festival	Best Supporting Actress	All You Need Is Pag-ibig	Nominated	
