= Batman Fights Dracula =

- Theatrical release poster
- Directed by: Leody M. Diaz
- Written by: Bert R. Mendoza
- Starring: Jing Abalos; Ramon d'Salva; Vivian Lorrain; Nort Nepomuceno; Dante Rivero; Rolan Robles
- Music by: Tony Maiquez
- Production company: Fidelis Productions
- Distributed by: Lea Productions
- Release date: June 3, 1967
- Country: Philippines
- Language: Filipino

Batman Fights Dracula is a lost 1967 Filipino parody superhero film directed by Leody M. Diaz and scripted by Bert R. Mendoza. The film, which was not authorized by DC, is thought to be lost.

== Plot ==
The story concerned the mad scientist named Dr. Zorba who, after repeatedly being defeated by Batman, finds a way to resurrect the wicked Count Dracula, control him, and even make him stronger, rendering him invincible towards traditional ways of killing him, such as Christian crosses.

Dracula sneaks into the Batcave and attacks Batman. Batman attempts to use holy water and a cross to injure the vampire, but due to Zorba's machinations, they have no effect. Dracula throws Batman against a wall and then flees, leaving Batman knocked out. When the unconscious Batman is found by his butler, Turko (a character based on Alfred Pennyworth), he tends to the crime fighter's wounds and then calls for Batman's girlfriend and sidekick to aid in tracking down his attacker.

After tracking down Zorba at his underground fortress, Ruben (a character based on the existing sidekick Robin) and the beautiful Marita manage to kill the evil doctor by turning the vampire against him. The vampire then is investigated by a recovering Batman within a cage in the Batcave, and the film ends with Batman lecturing Dracula about justice.

== Credited cast ==
- Jing Abalos as Batman / Bruce Mabuto
- Ramon d'Salva as Dr. Zorba
- Vivian Lorrain as Marita Banzon
- Nort Nepomuceno as Alan "Turko" Turkentop
- Dante Rivero as Dracula
- Rolan Robles as Ruben

== See also ==
- Alyas Batman at Robin
- James Batman, which is sometimes mistaken for Batman Fights Dracula
- Batman & Dracula trilogy
