= Otso-Otso: Pamela-Mela Wan =

2004 comedy film by Jerry Lopez Sineneng

- Theatrical release poster
- Directed by: Jerry Lopez Sineneng
- Written by: Mel Mendoza-del Rosario
- Story by: Jose Dennis Teodosio
- Starring: Bayani Agbayani; Vhong Navarro
- Cinematography: Ricardo Jose Trofeo
- Edited by: Marya Ignacio
- Music by: Jessie Lasaten
- Production company: Star Cinema
- Release date: March 17, 2004 (Philippines)
- Country: Philippines
- Languages: Filipino; Mandarin

Otso-Otso: Pamela-Mela Wan is a 2004 Filipino comedy film directed by Jerry Lopez Sineneng from a screenplay written by Mel Mendoza-del Rosario. Starring Bayani Agbayani and Vhong Navarro, the film's title was inspired by the two novelty dance songs popularized by the main actors: "Otso-Otso" and "Pamela".

== Plot ==
In a hospital in 1976, a lone nurse guards newborn babies when a combined freak storm, earthquake, and power outage happens, and the babies are mixed up and given to different families.

In the present, Amboy and Boy, sons of different families, are treated as outcasts. Boy is out of place in his family because he has no talent for singing, while Amboy lacks academic intelligence. Meanwhile, in Chinatown, Mao and Dao, who are spoiled by their mother, Mrs. Go, resist attempts at arranged marriages according to Chinese customs. Boy and Amboy flee to Manila after they misinterpret their unwitting rescue of the Mayor from an assassin's bullet through the otso-otso dance as an attack on them, while Mao and Dao go to Ilocos Norte to hitch a boat ride to Taiwan.

They ride separate Partas buses and meet their alternate identities while on stopover in Tarlac, while the Nurse tries to chase them. As they arrive at their destinations, confusion arises. Mao and Dao, who are mistaken for Boy and Amboy, became instant heroes and fit into their "families", especially with Mao having a good singing voice and Dao being intelligent. When Dao is asked to recreate the Otso-Otso dance, he instead creates the Pamela-Mela-Wan dance.

After being turned over to Mrs. Go after the nurse's distraction causes their bus to crash, Boy and Amboy, mistaken for Mao and Dao, try to adjust to the Chinese style of living before learning in a newspaper about their heroism and realizing that Mao and Dao have been mistaken for them. After telling Mrs. Go the truth, they return to Ilocos to confront Mao and Dao, persuading them not to push through with their escape to Taiwan and go back to Mrs. Go, while Mao and Dao convince their alter-egos to stand up to their families, realizing that they are loved all along.

Boy, Amboy, and their families, along with Mao, Dao, and Mrs. Go, attend the Mayor's Thanksgiving celebrations, where the latter survives another assassination attempt. The townspeople are confused when the foursome appears, but the Nurse arrives and tells them that the twins were switched due to the aforementioned accident, with Mao being a twin of Boy and Dao being a twin of Amboy. Mao and Dao comfort a distraught Mrs. Go, saying that she will always be their mother before returning to their biological families in celebration and performing their dances.

In the epilogue, the Nurse tracks down Mrs. Go's son, who is raised by an African family, and is overjoyed as she realizes that he is the last baby she has to find.

== Cast ==
- Vhong Navarro as:
  - Amboy Cabangon: The sibling who doesn't have a twin but later does.
  - Dao Go: The Chinese brother of Mao.
- Bayani Agbayani as
  - Boy Ronquillo: The person who always does chores and later had a twin.
  - Mao Go: The Chinese brother of Dao.
- Tessie Tomas as Mrs. Go: the mother of Mao and Dao.
- Gina Pareño as Tessie: A nurse who tries to fix the twins.
- Dexter Doria as Mrs. Cabangon: the mother of Amboy.
- Pinky Marquez as Mrs. Ronquillo: the mother of Boy.
- Miko Palanca as Gino Ronquillo: the brother of Boy.
- Denise Joaquin as Mooncake: Dao's supposed to be wife, but Amboy is the one who loves her.
- Angelene Aguilar as Pamela Zou Pamintuan: the daughter of a Mayor whom Amboy had a crush on, but Dao was mistaken for Amboy, so she also loved Dao.
- Cherry Lou as Pamela Lou Pamintuan: the daughter of a mayor, whom Boy had a crush on, but Mao was mistaken as Boy, so she loved Mao.
- Michelle Bayle as Tessa: Dao and Mao's maid, whom Boy became her love interest.
- Robin da Rosa as Max Ronquillo: the father of Boy.
- Karel Marquez as Yumi Ronquillo: the sister of Boy.
- Katrina "Jaja" Gonzales as Rica Cabangon: the twin sister of Cecil and sister of Amboy.
- Kristine "Boomboom" Gonzales as Cecil Cabangon: the twin sister of Rica and sister of Amboy.
- Dominic Roco as Mocky Cabangon: the twin brother of Marky and brother of Amboy.
- Felix Roco as Marky Cabangon: the twin brother of Mocky and brother of Amboy.
- Jon Romano as Bodyguard 1
- Gammy Viray as Mr. Go
- Len Ag-Santos as Mooncake's mother
- Dido dela Paz as Mayor Pamintuan: The town's mayor and Pamela Lou and Zou's father. He despised Boy and Amboy for their shenanigans until he became thankful to them for saving his life from being shot
- Rhouel de Villa as Bodyguard 2
- Carlos Castelo as Bodyguard 3
- TJ Ligonnes as Bodyguard 4
- Randy Zaransa as Bodyguard 5
- Meynard Marcelino as Friend
- Kris Martinez as Mooncake's brother
- Rey Solo as Bus Driver
- Jeffrey Tan as Mrs. Go's lost son
- Whitney Tyson as Ita
- Xavier (dog) as Bantay: the dog of Amboy
