= Captain Barbell (2011 TV series) =

2011 Philippine television drama series

- Title card
- Also known as: Captain Barbell: The Return
- Genre: Action drama; Fantasy
- Based on: Captain Barbell by Mars Ravelo
- Developed by: R.J. Nuevas
- Written by: Jules Dan Katanyag; Des Garbes-Severino; Karen Lustica
- Directed by: Dominic Zapata
- Starring: Richard Gutierrez
- Theme music composer: Sam Santos ("Sandata"); Vehnee Saturno ("Isama Mo Ako")
- Opening theme: "Sandata" by Shamrock
- Ending theme: "Isama Mo Ako" by Frencheska Farr
- Country of origin: Philippines
- Original language: Tagalog
- No. of episodes: 88

Production
- Executive producer: Winnie Hollis Reyes
- Camera setup: Multiple-camera setup
- Running time: 30–35 minutes
- Production company: GMA Entertainment TV

Original release
- Network: GMA Network
- Release: March 28 – July 29, 2011

Related
- Captain Barbell (2006)

Captain Barbell (trans. / international title: Captain Barbell: The Return) is a 2011 Philippine television drama action fantasy series broadcast by GMA Network. The series is based on a Philippine fictional superhero of the same title by Mars Ravelo. Directed by Dominic Zapata, it stars Richard Gutierrez in the title role. It premiered on March 28, 2011 on the network's Telebabad line up. The series concluded on July 29, 2011, with a total of 88 episodes.

== Cast and characters ==
Cast

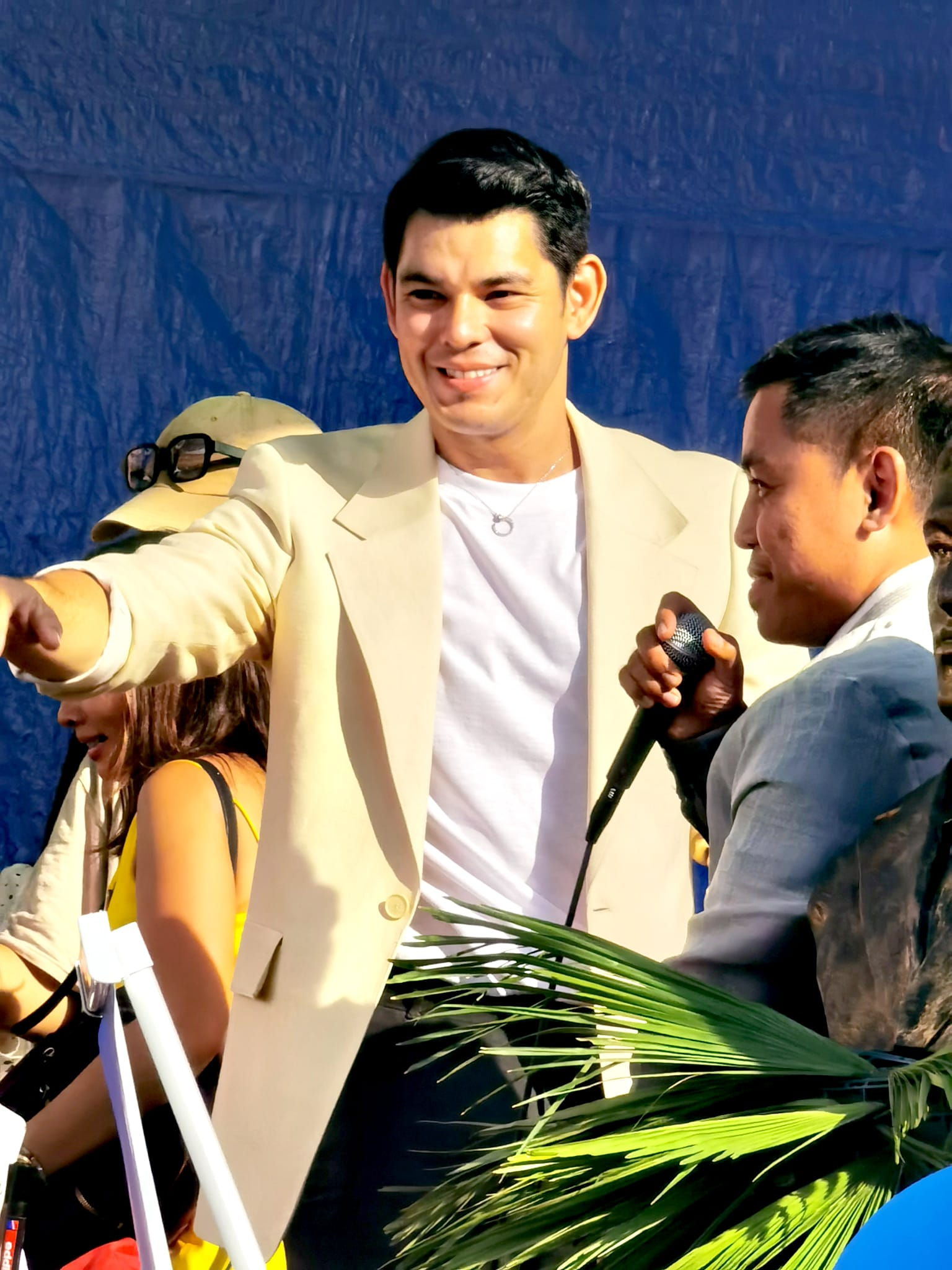
Richard Gutierrez

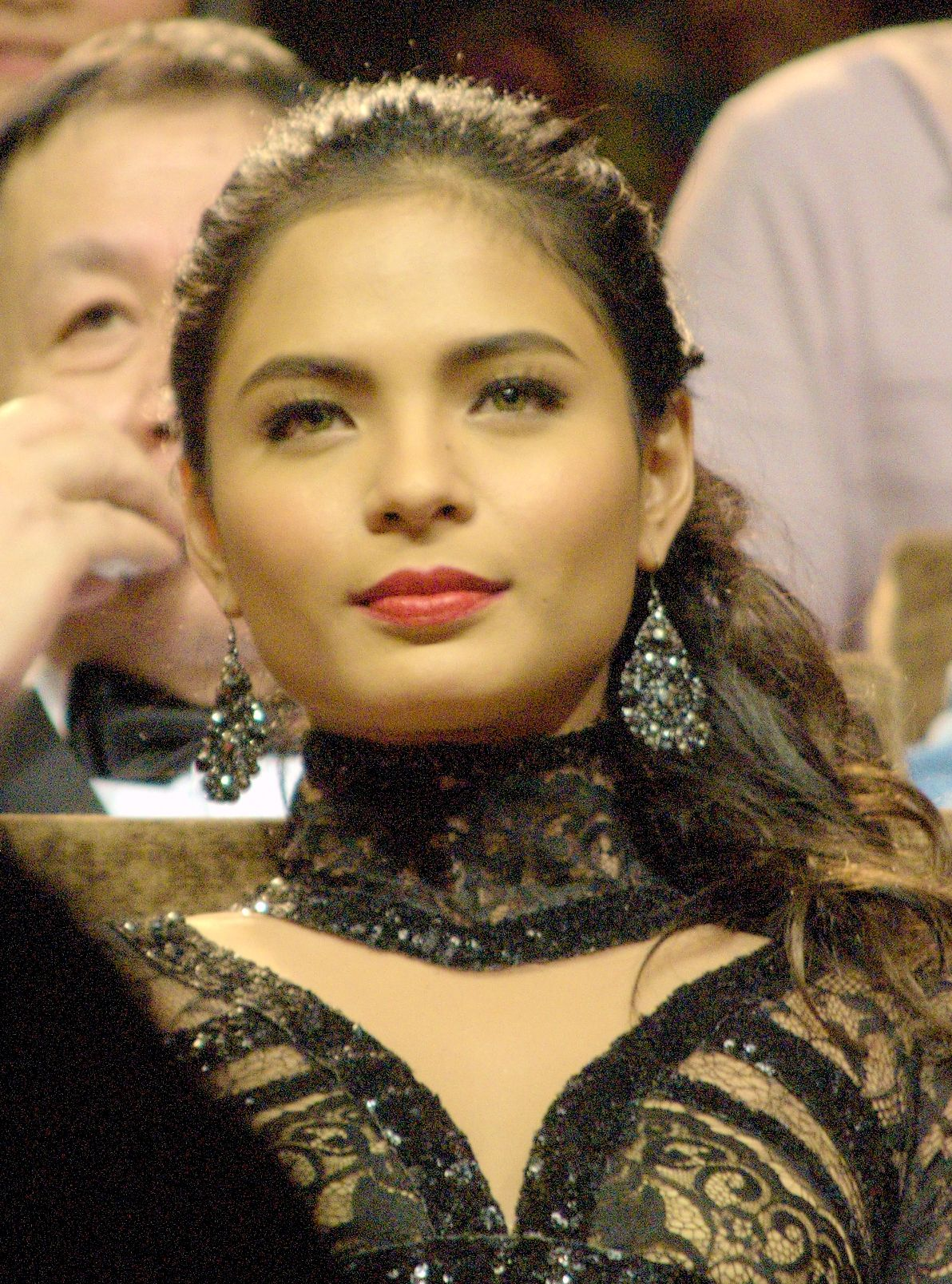
Lovi Poe

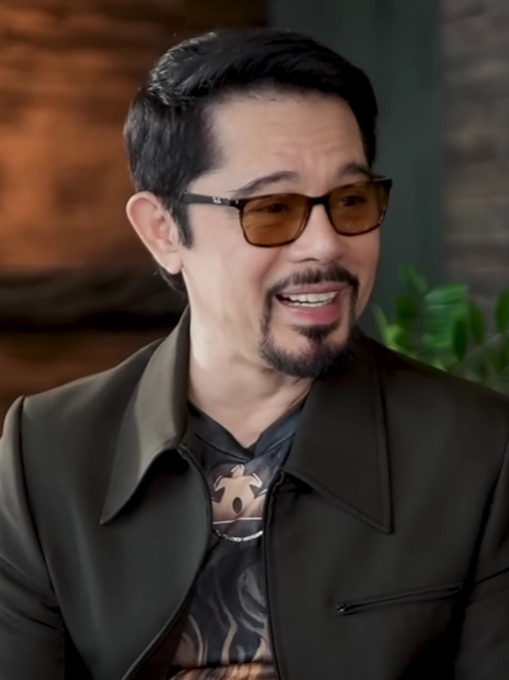
Christopher de Leon

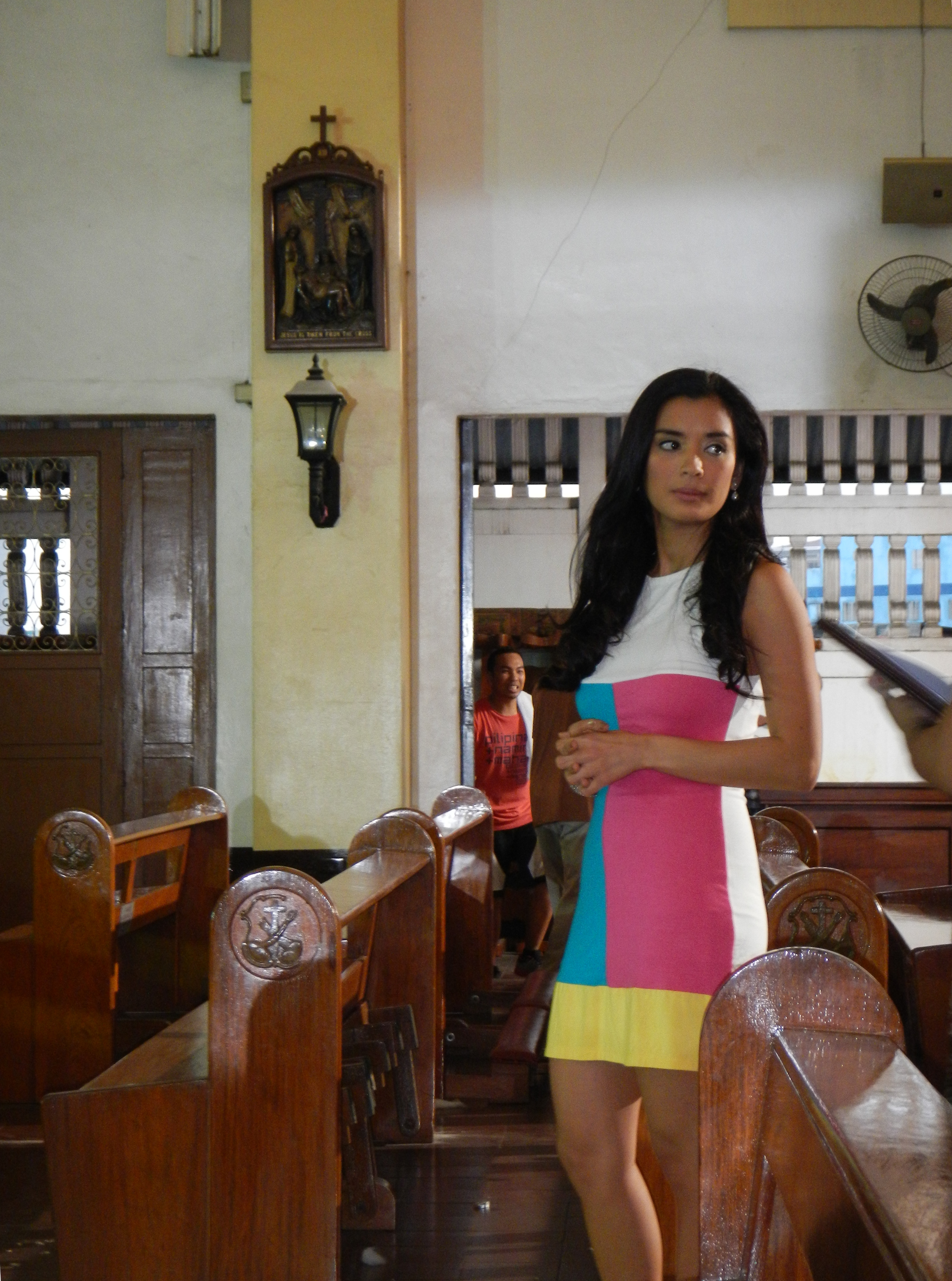
Michelle Madrigal

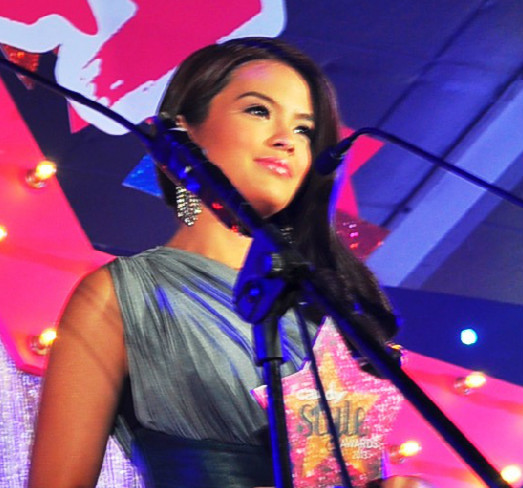
Bea Binene

Lead cast

- Richard Gutierrez as Potenciano "Teng" Magtanggol / Captain Barbell

Supporting cast

- Jillian Ward as Lelay / Super Tiny
- Lovi Poe as Althea
- Isabel Oli as Melanie Ocampo
- Christopher de Leon as Nero
- Michelle Madrigal as Anita / Cyclone
- Frencheska Farr as Celina / Sonica
- Sam Pinto as Sammy
- Solenn Heussaff as Janna Esquivel
- Ellen Adarna as Katrina "Kat" Lazatin / Fuega
- Jake Vargas as Alden / Spin
- Bea Binene as Misha / Blade
- Mike Tan as Teban / Anino
- Eddie Gutierrez as Armando Chavez
- TJ Trinidad as Gregor Javier / Metal Man
- Akihiro Sato as Bruno / Higante
- Paolo Paraiso as Rodel / Buhangin
- Ervic Vijandre as Ricky Alejandre / Kidlat
- Jon Hall as Robert
- Stef Prescott as Eva
- Elvis Gutierrez as Gaston / Black Angel

Recurring cast

- Ces Quesada as Liya
- Ryan Yllana as Bobby Santos
- Jaya Ramsey as Dolores Fernandez
- Marky Lopez as Hekki
- Lloyd Samartino as Manuel Javier
- Shamaine Centenera-Buencamino as Evie
- Christine Joy De Guzman as Angelina
- Saab Magalona as Kristel
- Nina Ricci Alagao as Corrinne Lumibao
- Joko Diaz as Bong
- Fayatollah as Wifey
- Jade Lopez as Melanie's officemate
- Jaime Fabregas as the president

Guest cast

- Rhian Ramos as Leah Lazaro-Magtanggol
- Jennylyn Mercado as Rose
- Tin Arnaldo as Ofelia Concepcion
- Dino Guevarra as Fernando
- Jennica Garcia as Linda / Aswang
- Bubbles Paraiso as Aswang
- Lilia Cuntapay as Faustina
- Rox Montealegre as Edith / Aswang
- Maxene Magalona as Dalisay
- Bianca King as Lary Gempez

== Production ==
Principal photography commenced on December 15, 2010.

== Ratings ==
According to AGB Nielsen Philippines' Mega Manila household television ratings, the pilot and final episode both earned a 25% rating.

== Accolades ==
Accolades received by Captain Barbell
Year	Award	Category	Recipient	Result	Ref.
2011	Golden Screen TV Awards	Outstanding Adapted Drama Series	Captain Barbell	Nominated	
2011	Golden Screen TV Awards	Outstanding Breakthrough Performance by an Actress	Frencheska Farr	Nominated	
2011	Golden Screen TV Awards	Outstanding Breakthrough Performance by an Actress	Solenn Heussaff	Nominated	
