= Roderick Paulate =

Filipino actor and politician

Member of the Quezon City Council from the 2nd district
- In office June 30, 2016 – June 30, 2019
- In office June 30, 2010 – January 22, 2016

Personal details
- Born: Roderick Mendenilla Paulate
- Party: Lakas–CMD (2021–present)
- Other political affiliations: NPC (2009–2018); KDP (2018–2021)
- Education: Jose Rizal College (High School)
- Occupation: Actor; comedian; television host; politician
- Years active: 1964–2022; 2023–present

Roderick Mendenilla Paulate (Tagalog pronunciation: [paʊ̯ˈlaː.tɛ]) is a Filipino actor, TV host, comedian and former politician. Paulate had previously hosted TV shows like Vilma On 7, Tonight With Dick & Carmi, Magandang Tanghali Bayan, and The Singing Bee. Paulate is also a comedian in shows Abangan Ang Susunod Na Kabanata, Oki Doki Doc, Mana Mana, Ang Tanging Ina: The Comedy Series, and Tweets For My Sweets. Paulate was also a dramatic actor in the TV shows, Malayo Pa Ang Umaga, Makita Ka Lang Muli, Rosalinda, Munting Heredera and the long-running action drama series, FPJ's Ang Probinsyano, in which he plays a mayor-politician.

== Biography ==
=== Child actor ===
Paulate began his career as a child actor. He received his first Best Child Actor award from the Manila Film Festival for the movie Kasalanan Kaya in 1968. His first FAMAS award was for Anghel Na Walang Langit in 1970.

=== Gay roles ===
Roderick's first foray in gay roles was in 1979 when he appeared in Maryo J. De Los Reyes' High School Circa ’65. He became Roda Coburns in the early evening sitcom, "Tepok Bunot" over BBC-Channel 2 with Bibeth Orteza, Isabel Rivas and Tony Mabesa. A producer then gave him the lead role in Charot, a movie inspired by Dustin Hoffman's gender-bending performance in Tootsie. His movie Inday Inday sa Balitaw was a huge success, that in 1987 he made four gay movies in a span of eight months: Jack en Poy, Bb. Tsuperman, Kumander Gringa, and 1+1=12+1. Paulate continued to play gay roles in movies and television. Paulate' influenced Vice Ganda, Allan K., and Paolo Ballesteros.

=== Non-gay roles ===
Paulate soon after tackled non-gay roles on both movies and television, displaying his versatility. His first known non-gay role during his peak years as a comedian was Last Two Minutes which he played a vertically challenged basketball coach with PBA Legends Alvin Patrimonio, Jerry Codiñera & Paul "Bong" Alvarez, and Regal teen stars Zoren Legaspi, Jeffrey Santos, Aljon Jimenez, Carmina Villarroel, Ruffa Gutierrez & Aiko Melendez. He also played the role of Ding, a mentally-challenged homeless mute in 1980 in the first Philippine TV series Malayo Pa Ang Umaga, about village life in the Philippines in the second world war under Japanese Imperial Army occupation. Paulate's 1st fantasy drama role was Engkanto, released in 1992 with the late hip hop king Francis Magalona. He played a straight tree man who saves the environment from nasty illegal loggers.

=== Singer and performer ===
Dubbed as the Rick Astley Of The Philippines, Paulate also ventured into singing where he was influenced by his singing idol Rick Astley. He was in-demand as a performer/host in various defunct variety shows, notably Tonight With Dick & Carmi, Vilma & Magandang Tanghali Bayan.

=== Awards ===
All in all, Paulate has received six Best Child Actor awards and 17 awards during his adult years starting with Inday, Inday sa Balitaw in 1986 (co-starring Maricel Soriano) when he received the Best Supporting Actor trophy. In 1996, Paulate was named Best Actor in Drama at the Asian Television Awards, and then in 2000, for his role in the Maalaala Mo Kaya episode "Wristwatch" and again in 1981, for his very difficult role in Malayo Pa Ang Umaga, the very first successful TV series in the Philippines.

Paulate is also inducted to the Philippines Eastwood City Walk Of Fame in 2012 for contributing his acting, singing, hosting and also being a comedian.

== Political career ==
Paulate was elected as councilor for Quezon City's 2nd district in 2010. Paulate was removed from office by the Office of the Ombudsman as councilor of Quezon City because of hiring ghost employees. He was barred from running for any public office.

Despite barring him from running for public office, Paulate ran for his third term as a councilor and was eventually elected.

On December 12, 2016, however, the Court of Appeals overturned the ruling of the Office of the Ombudsman's dismissing Paulate together with 3 other officials of the Quezon City local government from the public service.

Paulate unsuccessfully ran for vice mayor in 2019, as the running mate of former 2nd district representative Chuck Mathay. He also sought a return to the city council in 2022 for the 2nd district under the Malayang QC ticket of Mike Defensor, but was also unsuccessful.

On December 2, 2022, the Sandiganbayan convicted him of one count of graft and nine counts of falsification of public documents in connection with his hiring of ghost employees. He faces between 10 1/2 to 62 years in prison, a total fine of ₱90,000, and is permanently barred from holding public office. Paulate and his accomplice, his driver and liaison officer Vicente Bajamunde, were also ordered to compensate the government with the amount of public funds they embezzled, amounting to ₱1.109 million with 6% interest per annum until full payment. He filed a motion for reconsideration but it was denied by the court on January 23, 2023.

== Personal life ==
Paulate is single. He has previously dated Jackie Aquino, a daughter of former Senator Butz Aquino.

=== Education ===
He attended his primary education at José Rizal College and graduated in 1976.

He attended his secondary education at José Rizal College and graduated in 1984.

He attended his tertiary education at University of the Philippines, Manila campus and studied Political science, then shifted to Theater arts.

== Electoral history ==
Electoral history of Roderick Paulate
Year	Office	Party	Votes received				Result
Year	Office	Party	Total	%	P.	Swing	Result
2010	Councilor (Quezon City–2nd)	NPC	178,831	9.74%	5th	—N/a	Won
2013	Councilor (Quezon City–2nd)	IND	74,432	11.54%	3rd	+1.80	Won
2016	Councilor (Quezon City–2nd)	NPC	109,298	10.73%	6th	-0.81	Won
2019	Vice Mayor of Quezon City	KDP	112,697	13.23%	3rd	—N/a	Lost

== Filmography ==
=== Film ===
Year	Title	Role
1964	Ito Ang Lalake	
1967	Mga Kaibigan Kong Sto. Niño	Bong
1968	Bulag na Matador	
1968	Bandana	Himself
1968	The Karate Champions	Himself
1968	Kasalanan Kaya?	
1968	Mga Tigre sa Looban	
1968	Oh! My Papa	Ronald
1969	Sugapaan!	
1969	7 Fantastic Judo Karate Brothers	
1969	Zoom-Zoom Apollo	
1969	Musmos na Mandirigna	
1969	Petrang Paminta	
1970	Magic Makinilya	
1970	Lover For Hire	
1970	Si Ponso, Si Elena at Si Boy	
1970	Mga Anghel na Walang Langit	Bong
1971	Family Planning	
1971	Bella Bandida	
1971	Kurikit	
1971	Ang Tigre at Ang Diablo	
1971	Banderang Kapos	
1971	Sangre	
1971	Romantiko	
1972	Kung Matapang Ka!	
1972	Dirty Hari	
1972	Poor Little Rich Girl	
1972	Superbeast	Pepe
1972	El Vibora	Anton
1973	Alamat ni Limahong	
1973	Fight! Batman, Fight!	Robin
1973	Dugo ng Bayan	
1973	A Taste of Hell	Pedro
1974	Somewhere Over The Rainbow	
1974	Shazam Boom	
1974	As Long As There's Music	
1974	Tama Na, Erap	The Children
1974	Bagsik at kamandag ni Pedro Penduko	
1974	Ugat	
1974	Guo Shu Shi Duan	
1975	Sandugo	
1975	Anong Lahi Meron Si Adan	
1975	Hit and Run	
1975	Supercock	Child
1975	Teribol Dobol	Totoy
1975	Alkitrang Dugo	Andy
1976	Ang Erpat Kong Groovy	
1976	Magsikap: Kayod sa Araw, Kayod sa Gabi	
1976	Let's Do The Salsa	
1976	Isang Pag-ibig, Isang Pangarap at Isang Bulaklak	
1976	Walang Karanasan	Boyet
1976	Ligaya Ko'y Inagaw Mo	
1976	Scotch on the Rocks to Remember, Black Coffee to Forget	
1977	Tinimbang Ka, Bakit Husto?	Pandoy
1977	Hostage!.. Hanapin si Batuigas	
1977	Asiong Aksaya	
1977	Banta ng Kahapon	
1978	Boy Imus	
1979	High School Circa '65	
1979	Halik sa Paa, Halik sa Kamay	
1979	Tsikiting Master	
1980	Awat Na, Asiong Aksaya!	
1980	John & Marsha '80	
1980	Target! Kanang Kamay ni Nardo	
1980	Totoy Boogie	
1980	Aguila	Quintin
1981	Totoo Ba Ang Tsismis?	
1982	Dormitoryo! Buhay Estudyante	Joji
1982	Walang Atrasan	
1982	Just Say You Love Me	
1983	Porontoy	
1984	Hulihin Si... Boy Sputnik	
1984	Bitag	
1984	Rambo Tanggo Part III	
1984	Charot	Charot
1985	Hee-Man: Master of None	
1985	John en Marsha '85	
1985	Inday Bote	Duwende
1986	Praybet Depektib Akademi	
1986	Johnny Rocky Tanggo Part IV	Roda
1986	Sobra Na, Tama Na, Asiong Aksaya	
1986	Inday Inday sa Balitaw	Tonette
1986	No Blood, No Surrender	Dick
1987	Ako si Kiko, Ako si Kikay	Kiko/Kikay
1987	Bunsong Kerubin	Garutay
1987	Mga Anak ni Facifica Falayfay	Rodrigo Manalastas
1987	1+1=12+1	
1987	Kumander Gringa	Kumander Gringa
1987	Jack en Poy: Hale-Hale Hoy!	
1987	Binibining Tsuperman	Rogelio/Binibining Tsuper-man
1988	Leroy Leroy Sinta	Leroy/Liwayway
1988	Penoy... Balut	
1988	Me & Ninja Liit	Sha
1988	Petrang Kabayo at ang Pilyang Kuting	Pedrolino/Petra
1989	Engkantadang Kangkarot and Her Magic Talong	
1989	Tamis ng Unang Halik	Pomomoy
1989	Gorio & Tekla	Tekla
1989	Bote... Dyaryo... Garapa!	
1989	Last Two Minutes	
1990	Petrang Kabayo 2: Anong Ganda Mo! Mukha Kang Kabayo	Peter/Petra
1990	Small and Terrible	
1991	Underage Too	
1992	Engkanto	Yorac
1992	Buddy en Sol: Sine Ito!	
1993	Mga S'yanong Parak	Hunyo Sixto
1994	Bala at Lipistik	Roberto "Bobby"/Bambi
2000	Pera o Bayong (Not da TV!)	Lolo/Host
2004	Pa Siyam	Nilo
2005	Can This Be Love	Delfin
2009	Oh, My Girl!: A Laugh Story...	Crisp Pop Montojo
2009	Ded na si Lolo	Junee
2011	Zombadings 1: Patayin sa Shokot si Remington	Pops
2012	D' Kilabots Pogi Brothers Weh?!	Male Partner
2013	Kung Fu Divas	San-ing
2023	In His Mother's Eyes	Bibs
2025	Mudrasta: Ang Beking Ina!	Victor “Beki” Labrador

=== Television ===
Year	Title	Role
1972	Bahay-bahayan	Rod
1993–1995	Malayo Pa Ang Umaga	Ding
1988–1991	Tonight With Dick & Carmi	
1991–1997	Abangan Ang Susunod Na Kabanata	Benny Dela Croix
1994–1996	Game Na Game Na!	Himself / Host
1998–2000	Oki Doki Doc	Dickson
1998	Wansapanataym Christmas Special	
1998–2003	Magandang Tanghali Bayan	Himself / Host
2001	Eto Na Ang Susunod Na Kabanata	Benny Dela Croix
2003	Sana'y Wala Nang Wakas	Truman
2003	Ang Tanging Ina	Goliath
2005	M.R.S. (Most Requested Show)	Himself / Host
2005	Bora: Sons of the Beach	Dodong
2006–2007	Makita Ka Lang Muli	Valetin Barba / Vicar Barbarosa
2007–2008	That's My Doc	Major Ret Retualo
2009	Rosalinda	Florencio
2011–2012	Munting Heredera	Emmanuel "Manny" Mejia
2011	Spooky Nights Presents: Ang Munting Mahadera	Rody
2012	Tweets for My Sweet	JB Mercado
2012	Protégé: The Battle for the Big Artista Break	Mentor
2012–2013	H.O.T. TV	Himself / Host
2013	The Ryzza Mae Show	Himself / Guest
2013	It's Showtime	Himself / Guest
2013	Gandang Gabi Vice	Himself / Guest
2013–2015	The Singing Bee	Himself / Host
2016	Magpakailanman: Gay Organ Donor - The Genesis Laviana Story	Geni
2016	Magandang Buhay	Himself / Guest
2017	Wansapantaym: Amazing Ving	Chris Cristobal
2018–2019	FPJ's Ang Probinsyano	Mayor Adonis Dimaguiba
2019–2020	One of the Baes	Paps Fernando
2024–2025	Da Pers Family	Chef K
2025	Mga Batang Riles	Pol Alhambra
2025	Rainbow Rumble	Himself / Contestant

== Accolades ==
Year	Award-giving body	Category	Nominated work	Results
1987	Metro Manila Film Festival	Best Supporting Actor	1+1=12+1	Won
1996	Asian Television Awards	Best Actor in a Leading Role	Maalaala Mo Kaya: "Abo"	Won
2000	Asian Television Awards	Best Actor in a Leading Role	Maalaala Mo Kaya: "Wristwatch"	Won
2002	12th KBP Golden Dove Awards	Best Variety Show/Program Host	MTB	Won
2012	Eastwood City Walk Of Fame	Celebrity Inductee	—N/a	Won
2015	Golden Screen TV Awards	Helen Vela Lifetime Achievement Award for Comedy	—N/a	Won
2021	PMPC Star Awards for Television	Best Drama Supporting Actor	One of the Baes	Won
