= Abangan ang Susunod Na Kabanata =

- Title card
- Genre: Comedy
- Created by: ABS-CBN Studios
- Written by: Jose Javier Reyes
- Directed by: Johnny Manahan; Ipe Pelino
- Starring: Tessie Tomas; Nova Villa; Noel Trinidad; Anjo Yllana; Roderick Paulate; Carmi Martin
- Country of origin: Philippines
- Original language: Filipino
- No. of episodes: 298

Production
- Running time: 60-90 minutes

Original release
- Network: ABS-CBN
- Release: January 16, 1991 – June 17, 1997

Related
- Eto Na ang Susunod na Kabanata

Abangan ang Susunod na Kabanata (English: wait for the next chapter) is a Philippine television satirical sitcom show broadcast by ABS-CBN. Directed by Johnny Manahan and Ipe Pelino, it stars Tessie Tomas, Nova Villa, Noel Trinidad, Anjo Yllana, Roderick Paulate and Carmi Martin. It aired from January 16, 1991, to June 17, 1997, and was replaced by !Oka Tokat. It was re-aired on Jeepney TV. A sequel sitcom called Eto Na Ang Susunod Na Kabanata aired with some of the actors reprising their roles.

== Cast and characters ==
=== Main cast ===
Actor	Character	Character description
Noel Trinidad	Fernando 'Anding' Tengco	Anding Tengco is a corrupt congressman, an endless evil-doer, and a filthy rich womanizer. He will stop at nothing to get to the presidency, and conscience and truth are two words unknown to him. Due to his record of absence in Congress, he remains in his district office all the time with his scotch whisky.
Tessie Tomas	Barbara Tengco	Barbara is Anding's drug-crazed wife, whose only concerns in life are plastic surgery and shopping.
Anjo Yllana	Ferdinand Benigno 'Dino' Tengco	Dino is the only child of Anding and Barbara—spoiled and vulgar. Violence is the only way he expresses himself, having grown up psychologically impaired: At a very young age, he got thrown out a building window and survived.
Joji Isla	Del	Del is the bodyguard of Anding, proverbial yes-man, hitman, and executor. He is as ruthless as his boss, more scheming than his boss's wife, and dangerously at par with his boss's son when it comes to violence. He is paid to protect his boss and protect him and his interests he will, though sick and dastardly they may be.
Nova Villa	Tita delos Santos	Tita delos Santos is the ultimate representation of a social climber. She is the constant companion of Barbara Tengco, and she's as cheap as they come, obsessed with plastic and easy moneymaking gimmicks. She is the younger sibling of Luningning and sister in law of Samuel.
Roderick Paulate	Benny dela Croix	Benny dela Croix (read natively as Benny dela Cruz) is Barbara Tengco's beautician. He often gets involved in gossips, but knows how to predict the future. He doesn't hide his being gay, and that has never been a problem to him. His one great problem, though, is that he's married to a dumb nightclub dancer, Clara.
Carmi Martin	Clara	Clara is Benny's wife. She works as a cultural dancer for a local night club, Kulasisi Bar. She bore Benny twins, and she forever insists that her husband is not gay, a clear indication of how dumb she is. She grew up from Pagadian and earned her bachelor's degree with honors from a university there before coming to Manila. She is distant niece to Tita and Luningning thus a cousin to Jenny and Elizabeth.
Sammy Lagmay	Samuel 'Sammy' Lagmay	Samuel Lagmay is a poor, unfortunate soul. His indolence has deprived him of ever landing a job and improving his living conditions. He lives with his family in a shanty, and food on the table is a rarity in his life. He tries odd jobs, but nothing ever seems to work. Between jobs, he sleeps. He is the husband of Luningning.
Winnie Cordero	Liwanag Lagmay	Liwanag Lagmay can out-talk and out-nag anybody in the world. She is Samuel's second wife, and her greatest obsession and preoccupation in life is to nag her husband.
Jennifer Sevilla	Jennifer 'Jenny' Lagmay	Jenny is Samuel's charming daughter from a previous marriage. Jenny is Tita's niece and Luningning's only daughter. She exemplifies the poor who struggle to succeed in life. She studies, is intelligent, but will probably not amount to much, what with her father endlessly breathing down her neck, and her cousin Clara, tirelessly convincing her to become a dancer for the night club.
Jolina Magdangal	Jolina	Jolina, Jenny's best friend, is a stowaway who is bored of being rich. She is always found with her acid tongue, roaming the Lagmay household, picking at everyone.
Ina Raymundo	Trina delos Santos	Trina is Tito delos Santos's niece who came from the U.S. recently. She's young, beautiful and sexy, and that's probably her problem. Dino Tengco is an ardent admirer, and won't stop at anything to get to her.
Freddie Webb	Tito delos Santos	Tito is Tita's husband who is a campaign manager for Anding Tengco. He is the opposite character of Tita's; he is approachable, especially to the poor, especially Samuel. Tito delos Santos is the very strict, but caring husband of Tita.
Carmina Villarroel	Elizabeth delos Santos	Elizabeth is the sole daughter of Tito and Tita delos Santos. She constantly sides with her father on all issues, while she gets irritated with her mother's cheap and strict attitude towards her. She is also close to Jennifer, her cousin.
Nanette Inventor	Luningning Lagmay	Luningning is the eldest sibling of Tita. She always mediates in Tita's fights and lives in the slums with her husband Samuel. Tita always agreed with her. A childless widow, She is the problem solver of Samuel's issue.

=== Supporting cast ===
- Ogie Diaz
- Monti Tirasol
- Alicia Mayer as Adeline
- Michael "Eagle" Riggs
- Jon Santos as Various characters
- Nanette Inventor as Luningning Lagmay-Kataruray
- Ruby Rodriguez as Trisha Llamado
- Nena Perez Rubio as Mama Cita Tengco
- Boyong Baytion

== Movie spin-off ==
In 1993, a spin-off movie based on the sitcom was released. The film centers on Dino Tengco, the son of Congressman Anding Tengco and Barbara Tengco where he was sent to a mental hospital because of his abnormal behavior and becomes involved in a situation that leads him to seek a way to change his circumstances. The film was directed by Joey Marquez and written by Jose Javier Reyes, with Regal Entertainment as its production company.

== Sequel ==
In 2001, ABS-CBN aired Eto Na ang Susunod na Kabanata, a sequel to the original sitcom. The series continued the original program's political-satire format, portraying the lives of ordinary Filipinos and their interactions with political figures. It aired from April to September 2001.

== Awards ==
- 1991 PMPC Star Awards for Television: Best Comedy Show
- 1992 New York Festival: Bronze Medal
