= Captain Philippines at Boy Pinoy =

- Captain Philippines at Boy Pinoy (1965) film flyer drawn by Alfredo P. Alcala
- Directed by: Paquito Toledo
- Produced by: D'Lanor
- Starring: Bob Soler; Lou Salvador, Jr.
- Production company: D'Lanor Productions
- Release date: July 19, 1965
- Country: Philippines
- Language: Filipino

Captain Philippines at Boy Pinoy (lit. '"Captain Philippines and Boy Pinoy"') is a 1965 Filipino film produced by movie producer and actor Fernando Poe, Jr. through D'Lanor Productions. The film featuring Filipino superheroes Captain Philippines and Boy Pinoy was directed by Paquito Toledo. The movie starred Filipino actors Bob Soler (the first actor who acted as Captain Barbell) as Captain Philippines and Lou Salvador, Jr. as Boy Pinoy. The motorcycle-riding Captain Philippines’ costume and shield showcased the "three stars and a sun" and the four colors (blue, red, white and yellow) of the Philippine flag.

== Cast ==
- Bob Soler as Captain Philippines
- Lou Salvador Jr. as Boy Pinoy
- Nova Villa
- Marion Douglas
- Nello Nayo
- Pablo Virtuoso
- Jose Garcia
- Mary Walter
- Angelo Ventura
- Resty Sandel
- Vic Uematsu
- Diego Guerrero
- Marilou Murray
- Leni Trinidad

== See also ==
- Alyas Batman at Robin
- Alyas Batman en Robin
