= Alyas Batman at Robin =

- Directed by: Paquito Toledo
- Written by: Romy Espiritu; Marcelo Isidro
- Based on: Batman by Bob Kane and Bill Finger; Alyas Batman at Robin serialized in Horror Komiks
- Produced by: D'lanor
- Starring: Bob Soler; Lou Salvador Jr.; Nova Villa; Marion Douglas; Oscar Keesee
- Production company: D'lanor Productions
- Release date: 1965
- Country: Philippines
- Language: Filipino

Alyas Batman at Robin (lit. '"Alias: Batman and Robin"') is an unauthorized 1965 Filipino Batman comedy-adventure film produced by D'lanor Productions.

It stars famous Philippine actors such as Bob Soler, famous for his turn as Captain Barbell and The Phantom in other Filipino films, as Batman, Lou Salvador Jr., as Robin and actress Nova Villa.

== Cast ==
- Bob Soler as Batman
- Lou Salvador Jr. as Robin
- Nova Villa
- Marion Douglas
- Oscar Keesee
- Nello Nayo
- Pablo Virtuoso
- Joe Garcia
- Mary Walter
- Angel Buenaventura
- Vic Uematsu
- Diego Guerrero

== See also ==
- Alyas Batman en Robin
- James Batman
- Captain Philippines at Boy Pinoy
