= Captain Barbell (2006 TV series) =

2006 Philippine television drama series

- Title card
- Genre: Action drama; Fantasy
- Based on: Captain Barbell by Mars Ravelo
- Developed by: Don Michael Perez
- Directed by: Don Michael Perez
- Starring: Richard Gutierrez
- Opening theme: "Nandito Lang Ako" by Shamrock; "Sana" by Shamrock
- Country of origin: Philippines
- Original language: Tagalog
- No. of episodes: 165

Production
- Executive producer: Helen Rose Sese
- Camera setup: Multiple-camera setup
- Running time: 45 minutes
- Production company: GMA Entertainment TV

Original release
- Network: GMA Network
- Release: May 29, 2006 – January 12, 2007

Related
- Captain Barbell (2011)

Captain Barbell is a Philippine television drama action fantasy series broadcast by GMA Network. The series is based on a Philippine fictional character of the same name created by Mars Ravelo. Directed by Don Michael Perez, it stars Richard Gutierrez in the title role. It premiered on May 29, 2006 on the network's Telebabad line-up. The series concluded on January 12, 2007, with a total of 165 episodes.

A sequel aired in 2011.

== Cast and characters ==
Lead cast

- Richard Gutierrez as Captain Barbell / Arell / Potenciano "Teng" Magtanggol

Supporting cast

- Richard Gomez as Viel Villan / General V
- Patrick Garcia as Levi Villan / Super Levi
- Camille Prats as Marikit "Kit" Salvacion
- Rhian Ramos as Leah Lazaro
- JC de Vera as Boris / Little B
- Ryan Yllana as Bobby Santos
- Ricky Davao as Cesar Magtanggol
- Jackie Lou Blanco as Sandra Magtanggol
- Paolo Bediones as Captain B / Brando Laddran
- Angel Aquino as Barbara
- Snooky Serna as Mrs. B
- Gloria Sevilla as Carmela "Melay" Magtanggol
- Dino Guevarra as Narciso / Bubog
- Jeremy Marquez as Jared / Putakti / Cyborg 5564
- Mike Gayoso as Dexter
- Gary Estrada as Tenorio / Tetano
- Carlos Morales as Ador / Adobe
- Rufa Mae Quinto and Marissa Sanchez as Patti / Aero / Aerobika
- Jay Aquitania as Marvin / Vaporo
- Jason Hsu as Xu / Cyborg 5566
- Pinky Amador as Myra Lazaro
- Wendell Ramos as Ruben / Black Out
- Elizabeth Oropesa as Aurora Salvacion / Lady Amorseko
- Bong Alvarez as Dribol / Askoboy Coach
- Antonio Aquitania as Askoboy Captain
- Dion Ignacio as Askoboy Vice Captain
- Mylene Dizon as Magna / Magnetica
- John Lapus as Marlon "Mercy" / Mercurio
- January Isaac as Kristiana / Admiral K
- Ian Veneracion as Commander X
- Sunshine Dizon as Clarisse Magtanggol / Blanca / Ex-O

Guest cast

- Ryan Eigenmann as Abel
- Melissa Avelino as Chari
- Dante Rivero as Carlos "Aloy" Magtanggol
- John Regala as Lorenzo Lazaro
- Rez Cortez as Joe Salvacion
- Tricia Roman as a television news reporter
- Ces Quesada as Agnes
- Pinky de Leon as Victoria
- Tin Arnaldo as Tracy
Cast

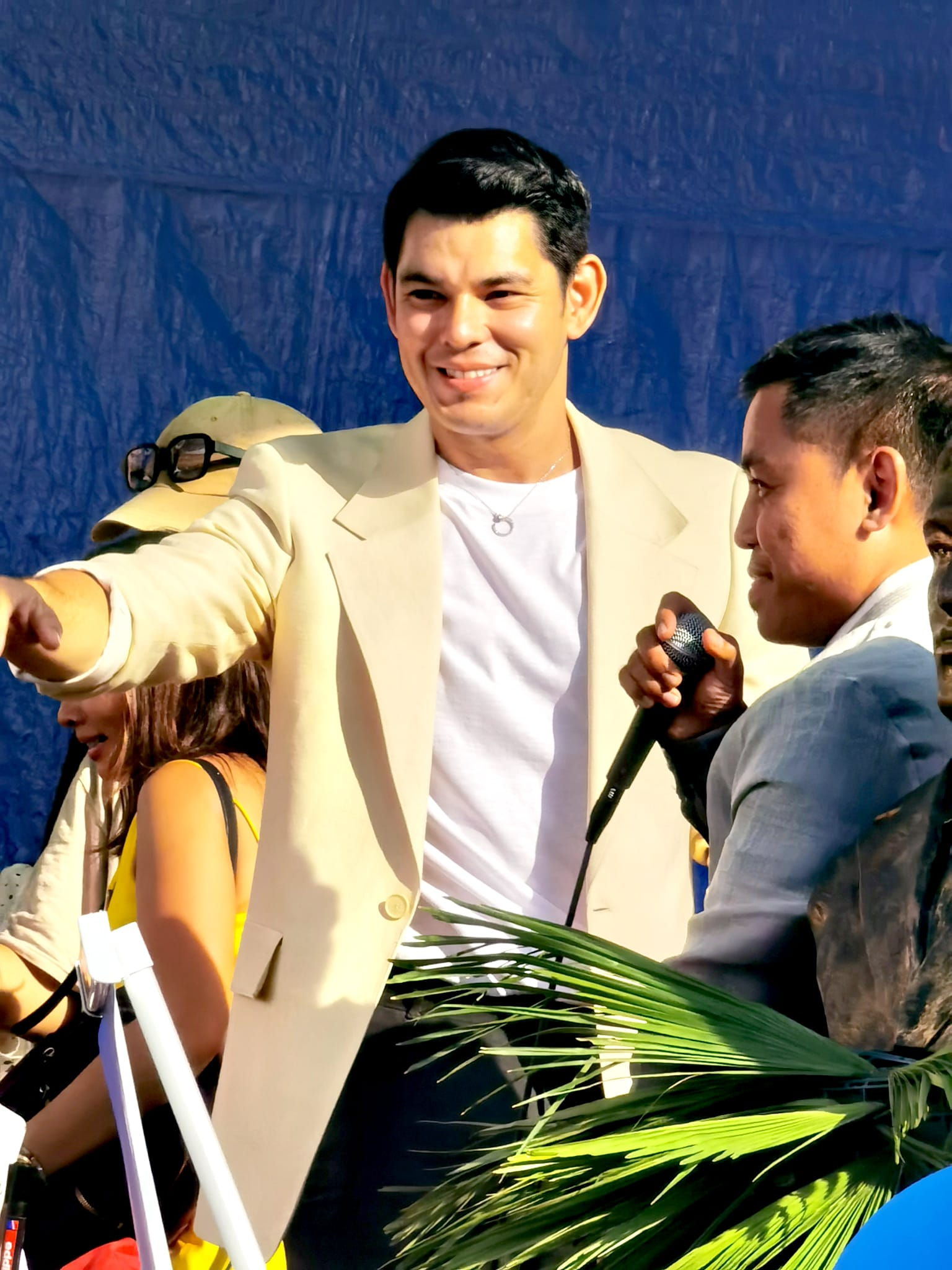
Richard Gutierrez

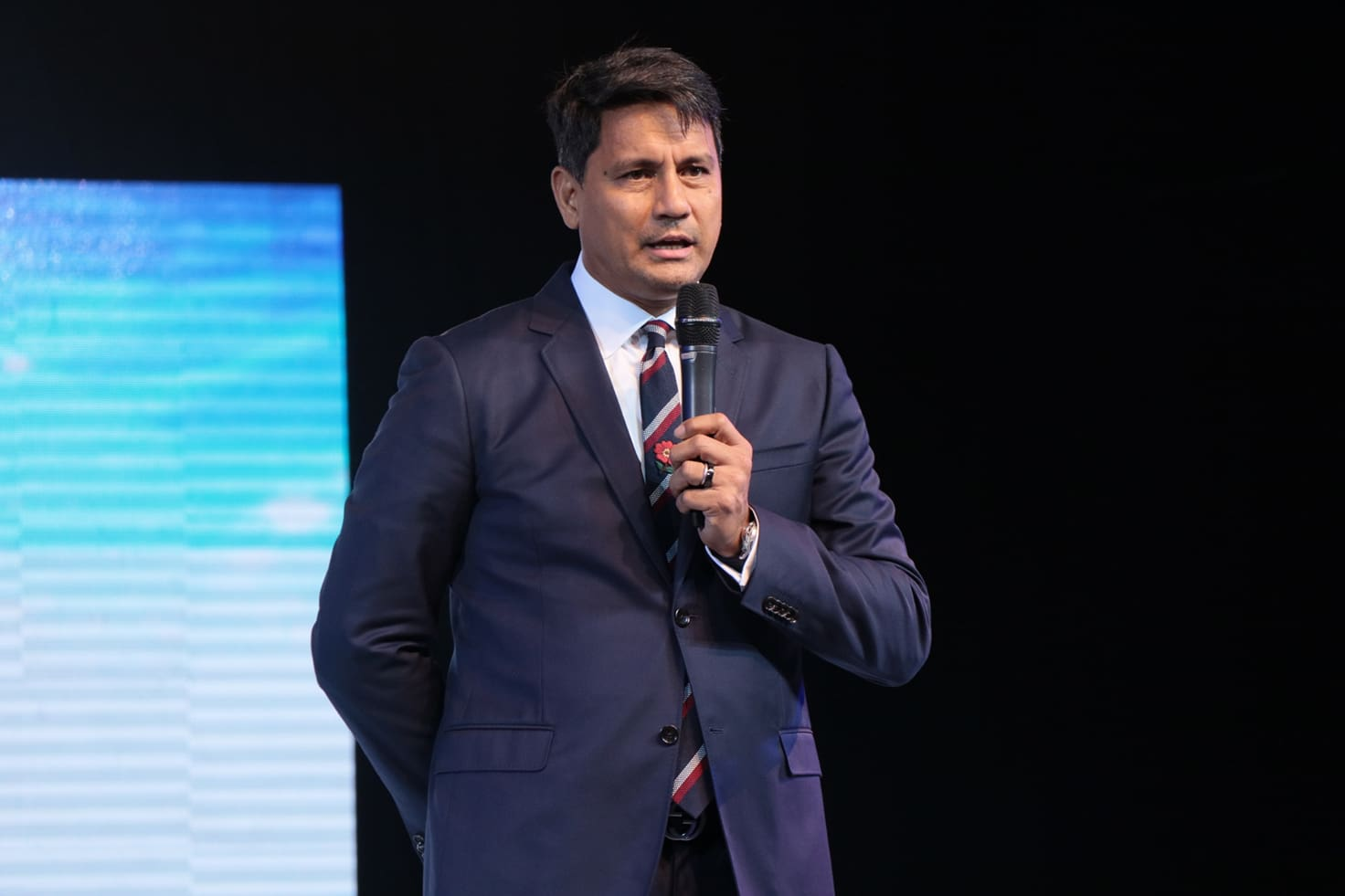
Richard Gomez

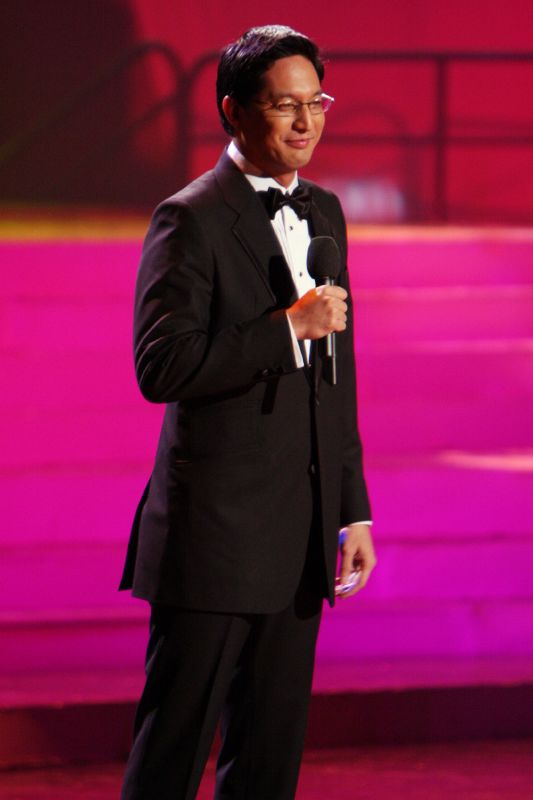
Paolo Bediones

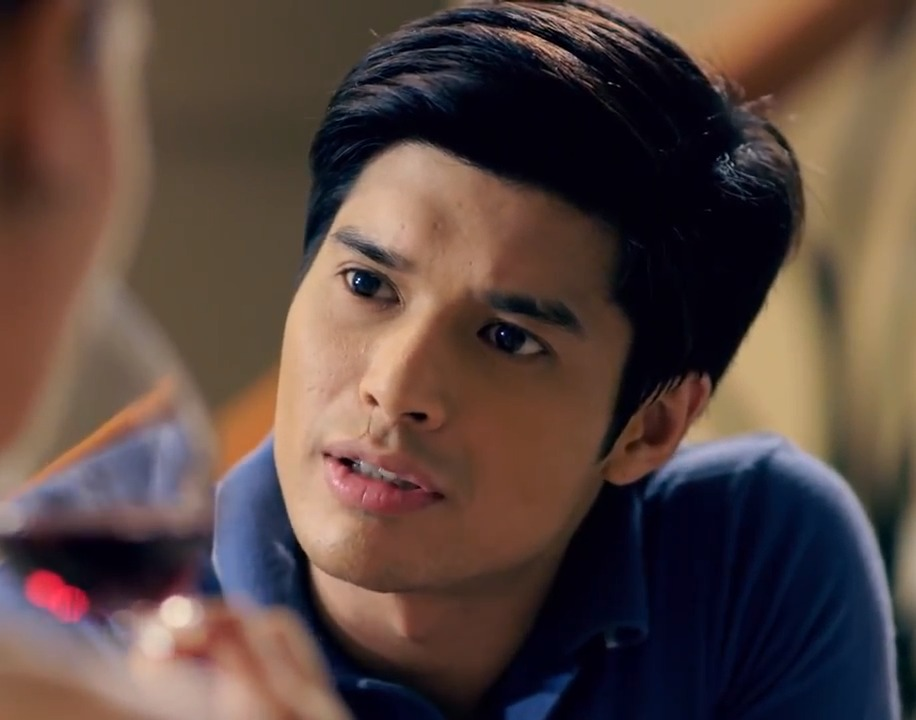
JC de Vera

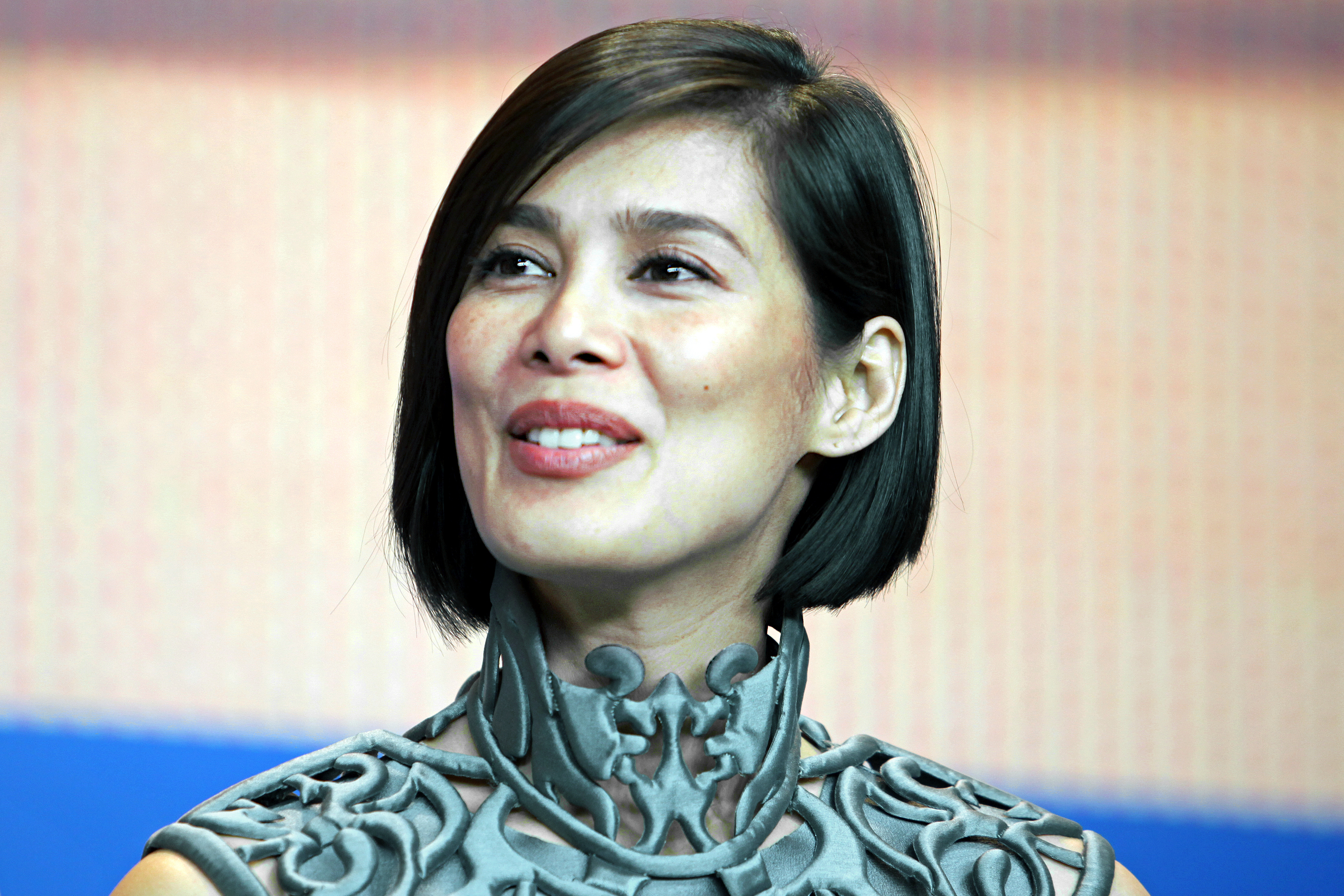
Angel Aquino

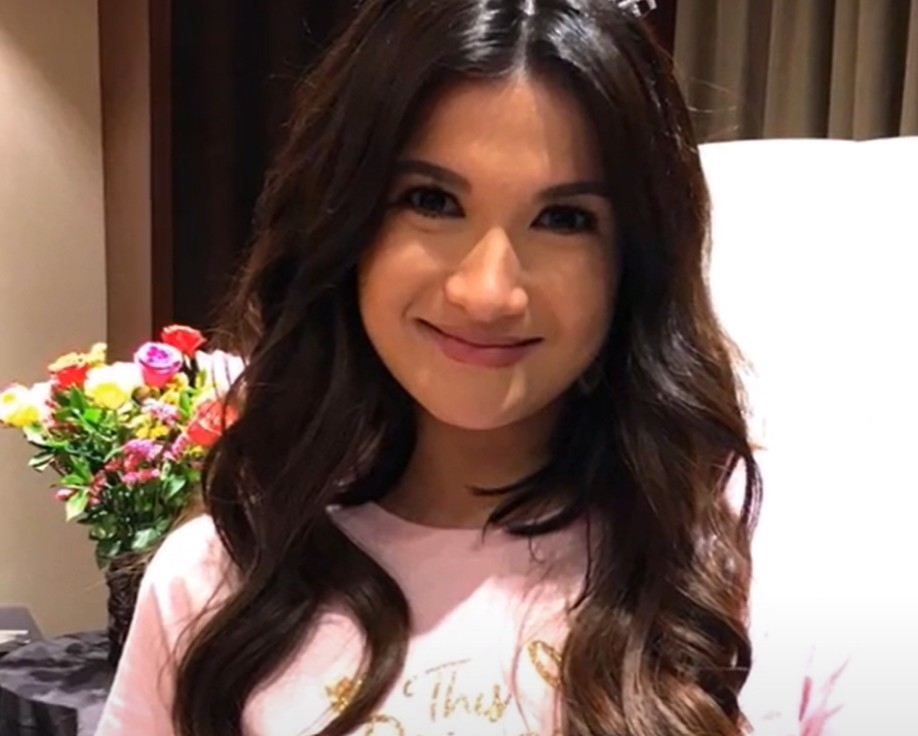
Camille Prats

== Production ==
Principal photography commenced in April 2006.

== Accolades ==
Accolades received by Captain Barbell
Year	Award	Category	Recipient	Result	Ref.
2007	21st PMPC Star Awards for Television	Best New Female TV Personality	Rhian Ramos	Nominated	
2007	21st PMPC Star Awards for Television	Best New Male TV Personality	Ryan Yllana	Nominated	
