= Eto Na ang Susunod na Kabanata =

- Genre: Sitcom
- Created by: ABS-CBN Studios
- Directed by: Bert de Leon; Johnny Manahan
- Starring: Tessie Tomas; and others
- Country of origin: Philippines
- Original language: Filipino
- No. of episodes: n/a

Production
- Running time: 1 hour

Original release
- Network: ABS-CBN
- Release: April 1 – September 9, 2001

Related
- Abangan ang Susunod na Kabanata

Eto Na ang Susunod na Kabanata (English: this is the next chapter) is a Philippine television news satire show broadcast by ABS-CBN. The series is a sequel to Abangan ang Susunod Na Kabanata. Directed by Bert de Leon and Johnny Manahan, it stars Tessie Tomas. It aired from April 1 to September 9, 2001. It was a political satire of the Philippine government; a situational comedy that depicts the lives of the common "tao" and their interactions with the "demi-gods" of politics. The show portrays the humorous state of Philippine affairs while making its audience aware of what is really happening to the country.

== Cast and characters ==
- Noel Trinidad as Anding Tengco
- Tessie Tomas as Barbara Tengco
- Gabe Mercado as JP
- Joji Isla as Del
- Sammy Lagmay† as Sammy Lagmay
- Candy Pangilinan as Perlita Lagmay
- Nova Villa as Tita Delos Santos
- Roderick Paulate as Benny Dela Cruz
- Carmi Martin as Clara
- Alicia Mayer as Adeline
- Winnie Cordero as Liwanag Lagmay
- Nanette Inventor as Liwanag Kataruray
- Berting Labra†
- Denise Joaquin as Twinkle
- Serena Dalrymple as Duchess
- Raffy Rodriguez
- Jon Santos
- Michelle Estevez as Trina Delos Santos
- Jennifer Sevilla as Jenny
- Ogie Diaz
- Jon Santos as Koring Sancho
- Kara Cruz as Kimberly Tengco

== See also ==
- List of programs broadcast by ABS-CBN
