= Alicia Mayer =

Filipina actress and model (born 1976)

- Born: Catherine Gutierrez; May 2, 1976 (age 50); Olongapo, Philippines
- Other names: Alicia, Catherine
- Occupations: Actress, comedian
- Years active: 1988–2013; 2023–2024

Catherine Gutierrez (born May 2, 1976), known professionally as Alicia Mayer, is a Filipino former model and actress.

== Biography ==
She was one of the hosts of the longest noon-time variety show, Eat Bulaga!. She was the Cover Girl of FHM 2003. Among Mayer's more notable roles was being on the cast of the comedy show Lagot Ka, Isusumbong Kita and the antagonist "Julianna" in the afternoon soap opera Saang Sulok ng Langit. She went to the cast of Muli, a Filipino-Malaysian soap opera playing the role of Rhea. Alicia who is a vegetarian recently became a spokesperson for PETA. She posed in front of photographers from all over the world wearing nothing but a bikini made of lettuce during her campaign for PETA. Alicia Mayer was originally discovered from her own self-managed internet website in 2002 under the name screen name Alicia Bonifacio.

== Filmography ==
=== Film ===
Year	Title	Role
2003	Fantastic Man	Faith
2012	El Presidente	Inang Bayan

=== Television / digital series ===
Year	Title	Role
1991–1997	Abangan ang Susunod na Kabanata	Adeline
1997–1998	Ikaw na Sana	Gia
2004–2006	Eat Bulaga!	Host
2001	Eto Na ang Susunod na Kabanata	Adeline
2003–2007	Lagot Ka, Isusumbong Kita	Sussy
2004	Kuya	Ms. X
2005	Bubble Gang	Herself
2005	Saang Sulok ng Langit	Juliana
2005	Sugo	Sontaya
2006	Extra Challenge	Herself
2007	Muli	Rhia
2007	Mga Mata ni Angelita	Delilah
2008	Tasya Fantasya	Miss Brigida / Queen Virtuosa
2009	SRO Cinemaserye: Moshi-Moshi, I Love You	Gina Ukihino
2010	First Time	Ms. Dimaculangan
2010–2011	Inday Wanda	Akit
2011	Sisid	Alona Zaragoza
2012	The Good Daughter	Sharon Alejandro-Reyes / Josephine
2012–2013	Paroa: Ang Kuwento ni Mariposa	Rosanna Villamor
2013	Anna Karenina	Brigette Fuentebella
2023–2024	Black Rider	Aira Yuzon-Valmoria
