= Jing Abalos =

Filipino actor

- Born: September 17, 1941 (age 84); Bayambang, Pangasinan
- Years active: 1957–1972

Jing Abalos (born September 17, 1941) is a Filipino actor. Abalos is a member of the S.O.S. Daredevils and has also worked a stunt instructor. He was born in Bayambang, Pangasinan and raised in Camiling, Tarlac.

Abalos was the third of the six children of Angelita Asuncion and Rufino Abalos. He finished his elementary and high school in Camiling College and he reached the first year Mechanical Engineering in Far Eastern University in Manila.

His first film was Amazona. He was introduced in the film Apat Na Agila (alternative title "Four Eagles"), and became a full-fledged star in Batman Fights Dracula under Lea Production in 1967, opposite Viviane Lorrain.

Abalos became a contract star of Lea Production and made several films in Taurus Production's The Lady Untouchable opposite Magda Gonzalez.

== Filmography ==
- Amazona (1957)
- Apat na Agila (1967)
- Batman Fights Dracula (1967) as Batman/Bruce Wayne
- Lady Untouchable (1968)
- Cueva Vaca (1972)
- Dirty Hari (1972)
- Mga Mapanganib (1972)
- Trafcon-Ancar Limbas Unit 57 (1972)
- Johnny Tanggo Rides Again... Tatanga-tanga, Dakila Naman (1982)
