= James Batman =

- Directed by: Artemio Marquez
- Screenplay by: Artemio Marquez
- Story by: Pepito Vera-Perez
- Based on: Batman by Bob Kane and Bill Finger; James Bond by Ian Fleming
- Produced by: Dolores H. Vera
- Starring: Dolphy; Boy Alano
- Cinematography: Amaury Agra
- Edited by: Jose H. Tarnate
- Music by: Carding Cruz
- Production company: Sampaguita Pictures
- Release date: September 18, 1966
- Running time: 96 minutes
- Country: Philippines
- Language: Filipino

James Batman is a 1966 Filipino Batman/James Bond cinematic spoof produced by Dolores H. Vera and released by Sampaguita Pictures. It stars Filipino comedian Dolphy as Batman and James Bond and Boy Alano as "Rubin".

== Premise ==
An evil organization called the CLAW has threatened nuclear annihilation on the rest of the world unless all countries submit to its rule within five days. Presenting a united front, an alliance of countries tap James Bond and Batman (and Robin) to stop the threat, but both Bond and Batman play brinkmanship with each other. As the hour to doomsday winds down, the heroes are eventually forced to work together. Little do the protagonists know that the real enemy is closer than they think.

== Cast ==
A scene from James Batman

- Dolphy as James Bond/Batman
- Boy Alano as Robin
- Shirley Moreno
- Bella Flores
- Diane Balen
- Elsa Boufard
- Nori Dalisay
- Johnny Ysmail Jr.
- Lynn D'Arce
- Jose Morelos
- Ben Medina
- Joy Del Sol
- Tessa Concepcion

== See also ==
- Alyas Batman en Robin, 1991 film
- Alyas Batman at Robin, 1965 film
- Batman Fights Dracula, 1967 film
