= Tessie Tomas =

Filipino actress and TV host (born 1950)

- Born: Rita Theresa Laforteza Hermosa; October 31, 1950 (age 75); Catbalogan, Samar, Philippines
- Education: University of the Philippines
- Occupations: Actress; Television host
- Years active: 1980–present
- Agents: RPN (1980–1987) ABS-CBN (1990–2004, 2009–2011, 2011–2012, 2017–2025) GMA Network (2004–2009, 2012–2017, 2025–present); TV5 (2011)
- Spouse: Roger Pullin
- Children: 1

Rita Theresa “Teresita” Laforteza Hermosa (born October 31, 1950), better known by her stage name, Tessie Tomas, is a Filipino actress, screenwriter and stand-up comedian. Regarded as the original "Queen of Daytime TV", she is best known for hosting some of the most successful TV programs in the Philippines such as Teysi ng Tahanan (1991), Compañero y Compañera (1997), and sitcoms including Onli in da Pilipins (1997), and Abangan ang Susunod Na Kabanata (1991). She was the first Filipino actress to score a nomination in the Best Actress category at the International Emmy Awards for her performance in the 1989 film, A Dangerous Life.

== Early life and education ==
Tomas was born in Catbalogan, Samar to actress and radio voice talent Laura Hermosa and lawyer Fernando Hermosa, who was also a part-time voice talent. She has five brothers, including actor Leo Hermosa and musician Cesar Hermosa, They move to Manila when she was 5 years old, She went to Espiritu Santo Parochial School and Far Eastern University and graduated with a degree in broadcasting from the Institute of Mass Communications of the University of the Philippines.

== Career ==
She began doing stints as a radio voice talent at the age of 10, including at radio programs of Tiya Dely and spent a decade working in the advertising industry at several companies before becoming the first Filipino creative director of McCann Erickson.

She first appeared in television through the gag show Champoy from 1981 to 1984. She was praised for her effective impersonation of weather presenter Amado Pineda. She then embarked on doing live shows, notable for her performances as Meldita, a satiric portrayal of then-first lady Imelda Marcos, Loida Dimagiba and Carmeling Lawiswis. She became a resident performer at the Music Museum, headlining successful shows as a standup comedy career throughout the 1990s. Dubbed as the second lady of television and the "Queen of Stand-up Comedy", she is cited as one of the pioneers of impersonation, famous for portraying the likes of Amanda Pineda, Miriam Defensor Santiago, Bonnie Buendia and Imelda Marcos.

Tomas returned to TV as main host of the morning talk show Teysi ng Tahanan and the weekly political satire Abangan ang Susunod Na Kabanata, playing the wealthy but eccentric Barbara Tengco along with the short-lived weekly miniseries Sa Sandaling Kailangan Mo Ako, playing Sonia Enriquez as her supporting role and antagonist. Separada (for which she created the screenplay), Ploning, and 100 are some of her other critically acclaimed films. She gained further success as an actress in the 1988 film, A Dangerous Life. Her performance was praised by critics and viewers, earning her nominations at the International Emmy Awards and American Cable Awards.

In her later years, she played several supporting roles in both film and television. She was praised by critics and viewers for her portrayal as the "cane-wielding" Doña Cielo Fierro in the ABS-CBN television series, Dirty Linen (2023). In 2024, she played Doña Bettina Caballero in the television series FPJ's Batang Quiapo.

== Philanthropy ==
Tomas served as a trustee of the Community and Family Services (CFSI), a non-governmental association affiliated with the United Nations High Commissioner for Refugees, from 1992 to 2002. She also participated in advocacies relating to Samar, the Mindanao peace process and Vietnamese refugees in the Philippines.

== Personal life ==
Tomas is married since 1994 to Roger Pullin, a British marine biologist. Their wedding in Manila was broadcast on Tomas' television show Teysi ng Tahanan. She has one son from her first husband, Robert P. Tomas, whom she separated with in 1979 following a seven-year relationship. Following Pullin's retirement, Tomas also became a resident of the Isle of Man in 2018 and has two stepchildren with him. She is also a fluent Waray speaker.

== Accolades ==
Tomas is celebrated as one of the "country’s most brilliant artists" and one of the greatest comedians of all time, noted for her "style and distinctive approach on comedy." In recognition of her contributions to the entertainment industry, she has won many accolades including "Best Actress" at the Gawad Tanglaw Awards, "Entertainer of the Year" at the Aliw Awards, Creative Guild's Hall of Fame award, Best Actress at the Cinemalaya Philippine Independent Film Festival, "Best Actress" at the QCinema International Film Festival, "Best Actress" at the Subic Bay International Film Festival and several nominations from Gawad Urian Awards and American Cable Awards.

== Filmography ==
=== Film ===
==== As an actress ====
Year	Title	Role	Note(s)	Ref(s).
1982	Schoolgirls	Teacher		
1983	Hula			
1983	Broken Marriage	Director		
1984	Akin ang Iyong... Katawan			
1984	Erpat Kong Forgets			
1985	Menudo at Pandesal			
1986	Napakasakit, Kuya Eddie	Susan		
1986	Paalam... Bukas ang Kasal Ko			
1986	Payaso			
1987	Once Upon a Time			
1987	Forward March			
1987	Jack en Poy: Hale-Hale Hoy!			
1991	Barbi for President			
1992	Cordora: Lulutang Ka sa Sarili Mong Dugo			
1993	Tikboy Tikas at Mga Khroaks Boys	The mother		
1993	Kamusta Ka, Aking Mahal?			
1993	Gagay: Prinsesa ng Brownout	Aling Timang		
1993	Dino... Abangan ang Susunod Na...	Barbara Tengco		
1993	Mama's Boys: Mga Praning-ning			
1994	Bala at Lipistik	Barbara Tengco		
1994	Walang Matigas Na Pulis sa Matinik Na Misis	Tiya Lucing		
1995	Pare Ko			
1995	Pempe ni Sara at Pen	Mrs. Grace		
1995	Salamat sa Lotto: Linggo-Linggo, Doble-Pasko!			
1997	Yes Darling: Walang Matigas Na Pulis... 2	Tiya Lucing		
1997	Hanggang Dito Na Lang		Also writer	
1998	Dahil Ba sa Kanya?	Helen Carmona		
2000	Bukas Na Lang Kita Mamahalin			
2001	Narinig Mo Na Ba ang L8est?			
2004	Otso-Otso Pamela-Mela-Wan	Mrs. Go		
2005	Pinoy Blonde			
2006	Rome & Juliet			
2008	Ploning	Seling / Old Celeste		
2008	One True Love	Julie Robles		
2008	100	Eloisa		
2009	Sanglaan	Olivia		
2010	The Red Shoes	Madame Vange		
2010	Two Funerals	Pilar		
2012	This Guy's in Love with U Mare!	Blessie Reyes	Supporting role	
2013	Coming Soon			
2014	Alienasyon			
2015	Piring			
2015	Water Lemon	Josepina Alboleda		
2015	Old Skool	Lola Fely		
2017	Extra Service	Lolly		
2017	Smaller and Smaller Circles	Gilda Salceda		
2024	Senior Moments	Segundina		

==== As screenwriter only ====
Year	Title	Note(s)	Ref(s).
1994	Separada		

=== Television ===
Year	Title	Role	Ref.
1980–1985	Champoy	Amanda Pineda	
1988	A Dangerous Life	Imelda Marcos	
1991–1997	Teysi ng Tahanan	Herself / host	
1991–1997	Abangan ang Susunod na Kabanata	Barbara Tengco	
1997–1998	Onli In Da Pilipins	Precious	
1998–1999	Sa Sandaling Kailangan Mo Ako	Sonia Enriquez	
2000–2002	Feel at Home	Herself / host	
2001	Eto Na Ang Susunod Na Kabanata	Barbara Tengco	
2003–2004	Buttercup	Erlinda	
2003–2004	Teysi	Herself / host	
2004	Maalaala Mo Kaya: Puno	Miriam Defensor-Santiago	
2004–2007	Bahay Mo Ba 'To?	Baby Mulingtapang-Benoit / Anying	
2008	Ako si Kim Samsoon	Sonia Buot	
2009–2010	George and Cecil	Maribel Murillo	
2010	Agimat: Ang Mga Alamat ni Ramon Revilla Tonyong Bayawak	Belen Dela Cruz	
2010–2011	Noah	Sarah Perez	
2011	Carlo J. Caparas' Bangis	Mama Mia	
2012	Mundo Man ay Magunaw	Donya Alicia La Peña	
2012	Maalaala Mo Kaya: Papag	Juaning	
2012	Coffee Prince	Elizabeth "Beth" Gomez	
2013	Kahit Nasaan Ka Man	Corazon	
2014	Kambal Sirena	Doña Margarita "Rita" Natividad	
2014	Strawberry Lane	Margaret Jaymalin	
2014	My Destiny	Dr. Obispo	
2015	Once Upon a Kiss	Mérida Almario	
2015–2016	Buena Familia	Marissa Agravante	
2016	Naku, Boss Ko!	Ms. F	
2018	The Blood Sisters	Dr. Rosemarie "Mamita" Bermudez	
2023	Dirty Linen	Doña Cielo Fierro	
2024	FPJ's Batang Quiapo	Señora Bettina Caballero	
2025	Lolong: Pangil ng Maynila	Lola Grasya	
2026	Born to Shine	Amelia Halari	
