= Denise Joaquin =

Filipino actress

- Born: Angelica Domingo; Philippines
- Occupation: Actress

Denise Joaquin (born Angelica Domingo) is a Filipino actress.

== Career ==
Joaquin started as a contract actor of Premiere Productions for which she did three movies Nagmumurang Kamatis, Anak ng Bulkan and Matrikula. She signed up with ABS-CBN's Talent Center (now Star Magic) when Premiere Productions closed and her three-year six-picture contract lapsed. She was one of the new actors launched as a member of Star Circle batch 6.

== Personal life ==
Joaquin is related to amateur basketball player Kiefer Ravena. She is close friends with Jodi Sta. Maria. She previously dated Justin Cuyugan and Steven Alonso.

Joaquin identifies as Christian.

== Filmography ==
=== Television ===
Year	Title	Role	Notes	Source
1998-2001	Richard Loves Lucy			
1999-2000	Labs Ko Si Babe			
1998	Maalaala Mo Kaya		Episode: "Extra"	
1998	Maalaala Mo Kaya		Episode: "Shoebox"	
1999	Maalaala Mo Kaya	Kenneth's girlfriend	Episode: "Karnabal"	
1999	Maalaala Mo Kaya		Episode: "Ambulansya"	
2000	Star Drama Theater Presents: Rave			
2001	Eto Na Ang Susunod Na Kabanata	Twinkle		
2002	Kay Tagal Kang Hinintay	Oxana		
2003	Maalaala Mo Kaya		Episode: "Crossword Puzzle"	
2006	Your Song Presents: I've Fallen In Love	Cristine		
2006	Komiks Presents: Inday Sa Balitaw	Nene		
2006	Komiks Presents: Da Adventures of Pedro Penduko	Nurse	Guest	
2006	Gulong ng Palad	Wendy		
2008	Love Spell Presents: The Game			
2015	You're My Home	Didith		
2011	Maalaala Mo Kaya		Episode: "Birth Certificate"	
2016	Maalaala Mo Kaya	Charlita	Episode: "Puno Ng Mangga"	
2019	Ang Probinsyano	Michelle Rivera		
2020	Stay-In Love	Beverly		
2021	Niña Niño	Delia		
2021	Bagong Umaga	Michelle		
2022	Flower of Evil	Raquel Rosales		
2023	Luv Is: Caught In His Arms	Lydia		

=== Film ===
Year	Title	Role	Notes	Source
1997	Nagmumurang Kamatis	Kikay		
1997	Matrikula	Jinky		
1997	Anak ng Bulkan	Teenage girl		
2000	Spirit Warriors	Gretch		
2002	Kung Ikaw Ay Isang Panaginip	Beauty		
2002	Jologs	Iza's friend		
2003	Ang Tanging Ina	Portia's friend		
2004	Feng Shui	Denise		
2004	Otso-Otso Pamela-Mela Wan	Mooncake		
2005	Can This Be Love	Lengleng		
2007	One More Chance	Guia		
2007	Paano Kita Iibigin	Rosy		
2015	A Second Chance	Guia		
2016	The Achy Breaky Hearts	Joan		
2017	Unexpectedly Yours	Angie		
2025	Kontrabida			
