= Saang Sulok ng Langit =

2005 Philippine television drama series

- Title card
- Also known as: Heaven's Corner
- Genre: Drama
- Directed by: Ruel S. Bayani
- Starring: Maxene Magalona; Raymond Bagatsing; Oyo Boy Sotto
- Theme music composer: Joey de Leon
- Opening theme: "Saang Sulok ng Langit" by Dindin Llarena
- Country of origin: Philippines
- Original language: Tagalog
- No. of episodes: 138

Production
- Executive producers: Antonio P. Tuviera; Malou Choa-Fagar
- Producer: Antonio P. Tuviera
- Camera setup: Multiple-camera setup
- Running time: 30 minutes
- Production company: TAPE Inc.

Original release
- Network: GMA Network
- Release: January 31 – August 12, 2005

Saang Sulok ng Langit (transl. which corner of heaven / international title: Heaven's Corner) is a 2005 Philippine television drama series broadcast by GMA Network. Directed by Ruel S. Bayani, it stars Maxene Magalona, Raymond Bagatsing and Oyo Boy Sotto. It premiered on January 31, 2005. The series concluded on August 12, 2005, with a total of 138 episodes.

== Cast and characters ==
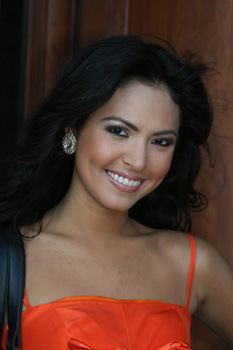
Maggie Wilson portrays Bettina.

Lead cast

- Raymond Bagatsing as Vergel
- Oyo Boy Sotto as Marky
- Maxene Magalona as Gemma

Supporting cast

- Jennifer Sevilla as Alona
- Alicia Mayer as Juliana
- Dindin Llarena as Joanna
- Jay Manalo as Dante
- Maggie Wilson as Bettina
- Bing Loyzaga as Odette
- January Isaac as Evelyn
- Karla Estrada as Liana
- Raquel Villavicencio as Amparo
- Rich Vergara as Tommy
- Andrew Shimmer as Nicolo
- Reggie Curley as Ronald
- John Medina as Justin
- JJ Zamora as Butil

Recurring cast

- Harlene Bautista as Ninang
- Jess Lapid, Jr. as Brando
- Ruby Rodriguez as Rosa
- Anton dela Paz as Bojo
- Abigael Arazo as Letlet
- Ira Eigenmann as Alice
- Jacque Estevez as Peachy
- Neil Ryan Sese as Mike
- Vice Ganda

== Accolades ==
Accolades received by Saang Sulok ng Langit
Year	Award	Category	Recipient	Result	Ref.
2005	Golden Screen TV Awards	Outstanding Director for a Drama Series	Ruel S. Bayani	Nominated	
2005	Golden Screen TV Awards	Outstanding Drama Series	Saang Sulok ng Langit	Nominated	
2005	Golden Screen TV Awards	Outstanding Supporting Actor in a Drama Series	Jay Manalo	Nominated	
2005	Golden Screen TV Awards	Outstanding Supporting Actress in a Drama Series	Jennifer Sevilla	Nominated	
