= Lou Salvador Jr. =

Filipino actor (1940–2008)

Lou Salvador, Jr.
- Born: Luis C. Salvador; December 4, 1940; Manila, Philippine Commonwealth
- Died: April 19, 2008 (aged 67); Las Vegas, Nevada, United States
- Occupation: Actor
- Years active: 1957–1975

Lou Salvador Jr. (December 4, 1940 – April 19, 2008) was a Filipino film actor. He was dubbed as "The James Dean of the Philippines".

He was the son of Lou Salvador, a famous basketball player turned film and stage producer. His father directed him in such films as Bad Boy (1957) and Barkada (1958). Salvador Jr. was a contract star of LVN Pictures.

After his retirement from the film industry in the late 1970s, Salvador Jr. moved to Las Vegas, Nevada, where he died in 2008 from lung cancer at the age of 67, eight months prior to his birthday at December 4. His final resting place is located at Palm Eastern Cemetery in Las Vegas, Nevada.

== Selected filmography ==
Year	Title	Role	Note(s)	Ref(s).
1957	Troop 11			
1957	Bad Boy			
1957	Sanga-Sangang Puso			
1958	Faithful	Joe		
1958	Combo Festival	Ramon Ferrera		
1958	Barkada	Carding		
1959	Masusunod... o Hindi?			
1960	Krus Na Daan			
1962	Albano Brothers	Tony Albano		
1962	Ako ang Katarungan	Juanito		
1965	Alyas Batman at Robin	Robin		
1965	Captain Philippines at Boy Pinoy	Boy Pinoy		
1968	Ang Pagbabalik ni Daniel Barrion			
1968	Tanging Ikaw	Tony		
1969	Ikaw ang Lahat sa Akin			
1971	Lilet	Enrico		
1972	Villa Miranda			
1973	Karnabal	Carnival Patron (Cameo Role)		
1975	Manila in the Claws of Light	Atong		
