= Captain Barbell =

Superhero

- Art by Reno Maniquis

Publication information
- First appearance: Pinoy Komiks #1 (May 23, 1963)
- Created by: Mars Ravelo; Jim Fernandez

In-story information
- Alter ego: Enteng
- Team affiliations: Darna; Lastikman
- Notable aliases: Kaptain Barbell; Enteng, Tenteng, Teng, Roberto
- Abilities: When Enteng lifts his magical barbell and shouts "Captain Barbell", he turns into the superhero Captain Barbell and possesses: Superhuman strength, stamina, speed, endurance and durability; Flight; Near Invulnerability; Vision and visual powers

Captain Barbell is a Filipino superhero created by the writer Mars Ravelo and artist Jim Fernandez. His characteristics are similar to the American superheroes Superman, DC Comics' Captain Marvel or Shazam, and Thor, but Ravelo based his backstory on Captain America. He first appeared in Pinoy Komiks #1 on May 23, 1963. He also appeared in Kampeon Komiks.

== Character history ==
The original version of Captain Barbell depicted him as shirtless. Recent comics depicted him wearing a long-sleeved yellow shirt instead of being shirtless.

== Origin ==
There have actually been more than one person to assume the hero's identity throughout the years.

=== Captain Barbell's alter ego ===
Tenteng

Dario

Gomer

Enteng

Digmaan

== The Barbell ==
A young boy named Enteng would lift the magical barbell to become Captain Barbell.

In previous Captain Barbell films, the Barbell which was given to Teng by an old man is the literal barbell that we know. However, in the TV series, the Barbell looks like a medallion with "CB" engraved on it. The name "Captain B" is also depicted on the medallion. Teng twists the medallion and it forms into a barbell, raises it and shouts "Captain Barbell" to change him into the superhero. As Captain Barbell, the medallion is depicted in his chest. To go back to his human form as Teng, he just grabs the medallion on his chest. The medallion is said to be made from Barbanium, a powerful element discovered in the year 2016. Only an equally powerful Askobar can counter its power.

== Costume ==
Richard Gutierrez' Captain Barbell suit in the 2006 TV series was designed by Filipino artist Reno Maniquis and was made by Miles Teves, a renowned Filipino-American costume maker in Hollywood. Teves is credited for the Batman, Spider-Man, Superman and RoboCop costumes. He was commissioned by Zaldy and Gina Ravelo of Mars Ravelo Marvelous Characters, Inc. to design the new look to make it CB's official costume. It was Dominic Zapata who suggested to the producers to have the costume made by Teves. Captain Barbell's updated suit is a far cry from the "Superman" inspired spandex tight fitting suit in shades of yellow, blue and red. The muscular costume is more inspired by the Batman's bulky costume, minus the mask and in shades of yellow for the suit, gold for CB logo and other embellishments, and red for the cape. The suit reportedly costs $50,000 excluding the charges for repairs in case of damages, making it the most expensive costume ever made for a single character in a Philippine film or TV series, for that matter.

== In other media ==
=== Film adaptations ===
Captain Barbell made several excursions onto the big screen. The first few Captain Barbell films were faithful to the original comics.

Film	Starring	Produced by	Directed by	Date released
Captain Barbell	Bob Soler as Captain Barbell; Dolphy as Tenteng	D'Lanor Productions, FPJ Productions	Herminio 'Butch' Bautista	May 9, 1964
Captain Barbell Kontra Captain Bakal	Wilie Sotelo as Captain Barbell; Carlos Padilla Jr. as Dario	Cirio H. Santiago Film Organization	Ruben Rustia	June 23, 1965
Captain Barbell Boom!	Dolphy as Ting-ting and Captain Barbell	RVQ Productions	Jose "Pepe" Wenceslao	December 22, 1973
Captain Barbell	Edu Manzano as Captain Barbell; Herbert Bautista as Tenteng; Sharon Cuneta as Darna (cameo) Lea Salonga as Rosemarie	Viva Films	Leroy Salvador	December 25, 1986
Captain Barbell	Ramon 'Bong' Revilla Jr. as Captain Barbell; Ogie Alcasid as Enteng; Regine Velasquez as Cielo/Darna (cameo); PJ Malonzo as Lastikman (cameo)	Premiere Entertainment Productions, Viva Films	Mac Alejandre	December 25, 2003

==== Captain Barbell (1964) ====
Bob Soler apparently was the first to portray the Captain in the 1964 Captain Barbell film produced by D'Lanor Productions directed by Herminio 'Butch' Bautista. Captain Barbell's alter-ego was called "Ting-ting", played by Dolphy.

In 1965, a year after Captain Barbell's film debut, Fernando Poe, Jr. produced the film Captain Philippines at Boy Pinoy under D'Lanor Productions directed by Paquito Toledo. It starred Bob Soler, the first Captain Barbell, as Captain Philippines and Lou Salvador, Jr. as Boy Pinoy.

==== Captain Barbell Kontra Captain Bakal (1965) ====
Wilie Sotelo starred as Captain Barbell, Nancy Roman as Joni, and Carlos Padilla Jr. as Dario in the 1965 film produced by Cirio H. Santiago and directed by Ruben Rustia. It was based on Pinoy Komiks Magasin's serial Captain Barbell Kontra Captain Bakal.

==== Captain Barbell Boom! (1973) ====
Dolphy plays as Ting-ting/Captain Barbell in the 1973 film produced by RVQ Productions and directed by Jose "Pepe" Wenceslao. His co-actors were Lotis Key as Lota, Panchito as Fonso, Babalu, and Maricel Soriano. Dolphy also starred as Ting-ting in the first Captain Barbell film.

The film was restored in 2019 as part of the ABS-CBN Film Restoration Project, renamed as simply Captain Barbell.

==== Captain Barbell (1986) ====
In 1986, Edu Manzano played the title character in Captain Barbell (commonly misspelled as Captain Barbel), made by Viva Films directed by Leroy Salvador. This remake followed the original comics story. The alter-ego Tengteng, the skinny character, was portrayed by Herbert Bautista, while Sharon Cuneta portrayed Darna in a cameo role. The cast included Lea Salonga as Rosemarie, Beth Bautista as Gagamba, and Tonton Gutierrez as Bampira. The film was a major hit among Filipino kids back in 1986.

==== Captain Barbell (2003) ====
The film version of Captain Barbell was released by Premiere Entertainment Productions in 2003 as part of the Metro Manila Film Festival where Ramon "Bong" Revilla Jr. played the role of Captain Barbell with Ogie Alcasid played the role of Enteng. The movie had cameo appearances of different Mars Ravelo's superheroes such as Darna, played by Regine Velasquez who plays the role of Cielo, Enteng's love interest and Lastikman played by PJ Malonzo. The film also stars Sarah Geronimo as Enteng's sister, Rufa Mae Quinto as Freezy, Epy Quizon as Dagampatay, Bearwin Meily as Libo and Albert Martinez as Lagablab.

It became the top grossing entry of the 2003 Metro Manila Film Festival with an overall box-office gross of ₱61.4 million.

===== Soundtrack =====
- Pangarap Kong Ibigin Ka sung by Regine Velasquez and Ogie Alcasid, composed by Ogie Alcasid
- Ang Awit ni Belen by Ogie Alcasid
- Pangarap Kong Ibigin Ka (Love theme) by Regine Velasquez
- Main Title Theme composed by Ogie Alcasid, arranged by Marc Lopez, performed by Ogie Alcasid and Regine Velasquez

=== TV series ===
==== 1980s animated series ====
Captain Barbell, an animated series, aired on RPN in the 1980s.

==== Darna (2005) ====
Captain Barbell (wearing a costume similar to Bong Revilla's Captain Barbell) guest starred in final episode of the 2005 TV version of Darna on November 25. He played a significant role by helping Darna but his face was not shown, rather, only the "CB" sign on his chest was focused since GMA had not yet decided who will take the role, and to promote the upcoming series. Dingdong Dantes and Cogie Domingo along with Richard Gutierrez were considered for the role of Captain Barbell.

==== 2006 TV series ====
Captain Barbell, directed by Mike Tuviera and Dominic Zapata, is GMA Network's 2006 project after Darna's successful run. Richard Gutierrez portrayed a different, modern version of Captain Barbell (whose human identity is Teng), in the 2006 TV series Captain Barbell which aired for eight months (broadcast 5 days a week from May 29, 2006, to January 12, 2007). It is the first series in which both the alter-ego and the superhero are portrayed by the same actor (just like Darna), making Richard the second actor to do so after Dolphy. In the Captain Barbell movies prior to the TV series, different actors play Captain Barbell and his skinny human alter-ego: in the 1986 film, Edu Manzano plays Captain Barbell while Herbert Bautista plays his human alter-ego Tengteng; in the 2003 film, Bong Revilla Jr. plays Captain Barbell while Ogie Alcasid plays his alterego Enteng, while Richard Gutierrez's uncle Jun Soler had Dolphy to play his alter ego Teng-teng.

However, critics say that the first few episodes of the series were a rip-off from Smallville. Despite criticisms, the fantasy-drama series adaptation of GMA-7 remains the network's top-rating show in its primetime block.

Contrary to initial assumption of critics, Captain Barbell is not an alien. He is a Filipino earthling from Philippine's distant future when the country became the center of the world's scientific research. This fact differentiates him from Superman who is an alien and reaches the Earth via a space pod. Captain Barbell's pod is a time machine.

Snooky Serna was replaced by Angel Aquino since the former had caused delays in the taping and subsequently increasing the cost of production. Usually, writers eliminate a cast by "killing" the character, or sending them to "vacation," with an open option for the character's re-appearance later on the series. Serna's character was significant to the storyline and eliminating her would drastically change it, so the writers revised part of the script, having Viel surgically change Barbara's face.

Ruffa Mae Quinto was a villain in the film version of Bong Revilla's Captain Barbell. She plays Freezy, a character derived from Batman's villains Mr. Freeze and Poison Ivy. In the TV series, she is also a villain - Aerobika, an entirely different character.

Captain Barbell's theme song "Nandito Lang Ako" is performed by Shamrock. The series love song "Sana" is also performed by Shamrock.

==== 2011 TV series ====
The TV series was remade in 2011 with Richard being the same Captain Barbell, not as a young boy but rather as a man. His wife, Leah (Rhian Ramos) died and the main plot involves the sudden appearance of the superhero (the five-year time gap between the two series suggests a disappearance of Captain Barbell, probably to attend to his new wife back then).

=== Cameos ===
Captain Barbell briefly appears in the 1994 fantasy comedy film Ang Pagbabalik ni Pedro Penduko, when Abraham (Chiquito), a collector, wields a barbell that transforms him into the superhero (played by Andrew E.) and helps the titular character fight the antagonists.

== Plot ==
In every version of the story, major changes in the story plot are applied, but the core story remains the same. Enteng, a poor, wimpy and skinny but kindhearted boy always gets bullied by other people because he is undersized and easy to pick on. He tries to practice weight training and exercise to improve his physique, but his poor status prevents him to do it properly. He ends up buying (or finding in other versions) an old, secondhand and rusty barbell for him to practice on. He later discovers that the Barbell contains hidden powers, when he lifts it in one hand and shouts the name "Captain Barbell", he transforms to Captain Barbell, a superhero possessing invulnerability, super strength, x-ray vision, incredible speed and the power of flight. With his newfound powers, he fights evil forces and protects the weak and helpless.

In the 2006 TV series, Captain Barbell is shown to have a weakness: Exposure to the element, Askobar.

== Future ==
The most recent Captain Barbell feature film was released in 2003 by Viva Films, featuring Bong Revilla in the title role, Ogie Alcasid as Tengteng. Regine Velasquez made a cameo as Darna. The film was directed by Mac Alejandre. Coincidentally, Ruffa Mae Quinto also had a role in this film as a supervillain named Freezy, an icy temptress with cold-based powers.

After the end of the 2006 Captain Barbell TV series, GMA aired a teaser hinting the coming of a joint series, Captain Barbell Meets Darna. IMDb posted the same title, which would supposedly be led by Dingdong Dantes and Karylle sometime in late 2007, but did not materialize. In January 2008, it was announced that GMA Network decided to make another TV version of Darna but that would be along with Captain Barbell and starred by Richard Gutierrez as Captain Barbell and either Rhian Ramos, Jackie Rice or Marian Rivera as Darna. But due to schedule conflicts of Richard Gutierrez who was busy with other roles, everything was shelved. By that time, Angel Locsin had already transferred to rival network ABS-CBN in 2007. It did not materialize as well.

In 2012, ABS-CBN Corporation acquired the rights to do a TV and movie remake of the works of Mars Ravelo including Darna, Captain Barbell and Dyesebel.

== Collected editions ==
Title	Volume	Issue	Date
Captain Barbell	Pinoy Komiks Magasin	#1	May 23, 1963
Captain Barbell	Pinoy Komiks Magasin	#2	June 6, 1963
Captain Barbell	Pinoy Komiks Magasin	#3	July, 1963
Captain Barbell	Pinoy Komiks Magasin	#5	July 18, 1963
Captain Barbell	Pinoy Komiks Magasin	#8	August 29, 1963
Captain Barbell	Pinoy Komiks Magasin	#15	December 5, 1963
Captain Barbell	Pinoy Komiks Magasin	#23	March 26, 1964
Captain Barbell	Pinoy Komiks Magasin	#24	April 9, 1964
Captain Barbell	Pinoy Komiks Magasin	#28	June 4, 1964
Captain Barbell	Pinoy Komiks Magasin	#29	June 18, 1964
Captain Barbell Kontra Captain Bakal	Pinoy Komiks Magasin	#5	July 18, 1963
Captain Barbell Kontra Captain Bakal	Pinoy Komiks Magasin	#15	December 5, 1963
Captain Barbell Kontra Captain Bakal	Pinoy Komiks Magasin	#31	July 16, 1964
Captain Barbell Kontra Captain Bakal	Pinoy Komiks Magasin	#2234	March 1, 2002
Captain Barbell Versus Flash Fifita	Liwayway (1966-1967)	#1	December 26, 1966

== See also ==
- List of Filipino superheroes
- Superman
- Shazam
- Thor
