= Alyas Batman en Robin =

1991 superhero comedy film starring Joey de Leon, Rene Requiestas

- Directed by: Tony Y. Reyes
- Written by: Joey de Leon; Tony Y. Reyes
- Based on: Batman by Bob Kane and Bill Finger
- Starring: Joey de Leon; Rene Requiestas; Keempee de Leon; Vina Morales; Dawn Zulueta
- Cinematography: Oscar Querijero
- Edited by: Eduardo Jarlego
- Music by: Mon del Rosario
- Production companies: Viva Films; Regal Films
- Distributed by: Regal Films
- Release date: April 6, 1991
- Running time: 102 minutes
- Country: Philippines
- Languages: Filipino; English

Alyas Batman en Robin (lit. 'Alias Batman and Robin') is a 1991 Filipino musical-comedy superhero parody film based on the titular superheroes from DC Comics, Batman and Robin. It stars Joey de Leon as Batman, Rene Requiestas as the Joker, Dawn Zulueta as Angelique Legarda, Vina Morales as Vina, de Leon's son Keempee as Robin, and Panchito as the Penguin. Several songs in the film use melodies taken from other early rock and roll staples such as "At the Hop", "Bird Dog", "Lucille", and "Surfin' Safari".

Originally produced by Viva Films, the film was delayed from its original release in early 1989 when Warner Bros. objected to the use of their characters' names and costumes. The film was eventually produced and released on April 6, 1991 by Viva Film's rival studio, Regal Films.

== Plot ==
Inspired by the DC Comics comic books, brothers Bruce and Kevin dress up as Batman and Robin to fight crime. Around the same time, Kevin's classmate Jocson and his petty criminal uncle Paeng are inspired by the comics to dress up as the Joker and the Penguin to commit crimes.

== Cast ==
- Joey de Leon as Bruce/Batman
- Keempee de Leon as Kevin/Robin
- Rene Requiestas as Jocson/Joker
- Panchito as Tiyo Paeng/Tiyo Paenguin
- Dawn Zulueta as Angelique Legarda
- Vina Morales as Vina
- Almira Muhlach as Catwoman
- Chinkee Tan as Glasses
- Cathy Mora
- Ruben Rustia
- Mon Alvir
- Bomber Moran
- Joaquin Fajardo
- Yoyong Martirez
- Rommel Valdez
- Ernie Forte
- Rene Hawkins
- Danny Rojo
- Bert Cayanan
- Rey Solo
- Jun de Guia
- Ariel Villasanta
- Nemy Gutierez
- Enciong Reyes

== Production ==
The film was initially an unauthorized production from Viva Films, set to be released in 1989 to capitalize on the then in-production 1989 Batman film starring Michael Keaton. Shooting lasted into June 1989, with comedians Joey de Leon and Rene Requiestas alleging that Dawn Zulueta was causing delays in the final weeks of shooting due to prioritizing her other commitments. Warner Bros. (Note: The Manila Standard erroneously referred to King Features Syndicate as the copyright owners of the Batman franchise; most other sources named Warner Bros. as the company who threatened legal action.) objected to the use of their characters' names and costumes, which resulted in production being halted a day before its completion. Despite de Leon's attempt to remedy the situation by proposing to title the film Hello Batman... How's Robin, the release of the film was still blocked for some time. According to Joey's son Jako de Leon, the producers of the film negotiated with Warner Bros. for the official rights and licensing over the use of the Batman intellectual property, eventually clearing its release by Regal Films in 1991, two years later than the intended 1989 release.

A sequel was planned, launching Thursday group member and popular matinee teen idol and heartthrob Hector Chua, but those plans did not materialize.

=== Parodies ===
The "R" on the Robin costume was intentionally stylized to resemble the logo of its eventual producer, Regal Films, a rival to the film's original production company Viva Films. Joey de Leon breaks the fourth wall to point this out, and Keempee de Leon apologetically says "Nabili na" (lit. '"It's been bought"').

Panchito's Tiyo Paenguin literally means "Uncle Paenguin", which is a portmanteau of the names "Tiyo Paeng" (Paeng being a nickname for Raphael/Rafael) and "Penguin". The name is also a double entendre of the Spanish-derived Filipino term for fellatio, chupa.

Joey de Leon imitates the mannerisms of Fernando Poe Jr. in some scenes of the film. Poe had earlier produced a similar Batman parody film in 1965.

Dawn Zulueta's character is based on Vicky Vale, Batman's love-interest who works as a reporter in the comics and as a photojournalist in Kim Basinger's version of the character in the 1989 film. Similarly, her name is a combination of the names of then-ABS-CBN News and Current Affairs correspondents, Angelique Lazo and Loren Legarda. In the final song and dance sequence, she appears dressed as Wonder Woman. Her butler, Noli Boy, on the other hand is a spoof of another ABS-CBN anchor Noli de Castro, with him often quoting the latter's signature Magandang Gabi, Bayan.

== See also ==
- Alyas Batman at Robin, a 1965 Filipino film
- James Batman
