= Golden Age of Philippine cinema =

Period in Philippine cinema history

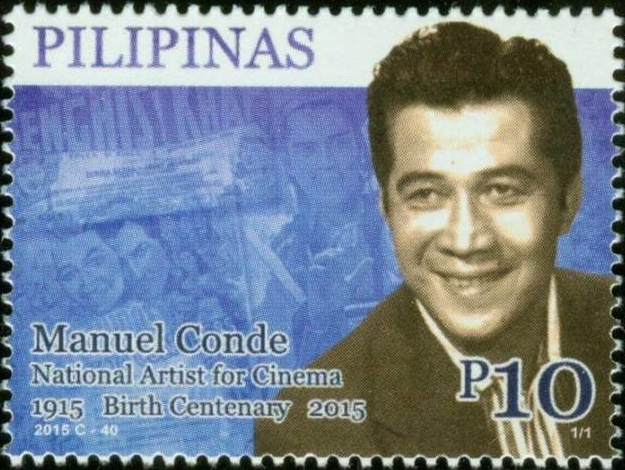
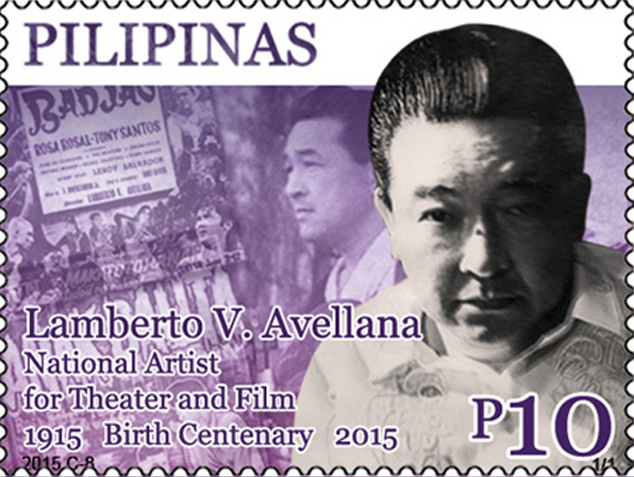
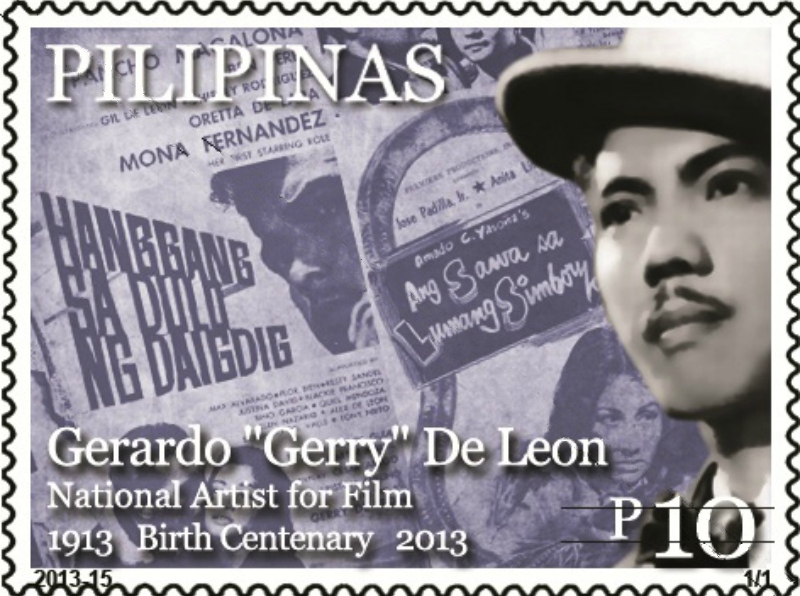
- The leading filmmakers of the period; Conde, Avellana, and De Leon, as depicted in Philpost commemorative stamps
- Years active: 1950–1959
- Location: Philippines
- Major figures: Manuel Conde; Lamberto V. Avellana; Gerardo de León; Gloria Romero; Eddie Romero; Dolphy; Eddie Garcia; Rogelio de la Rosa; Carmen Rosales; Narcisa de León; Nida Blanca; Nestor de Villa; José Roxas Perez; Rosa del Rosario; Nene Vera-Perez; Paraluman; Lolita Rodriguez; Charito Solis; Rosa Rosal; Cirio H. Santiago; Tessie Agana
- Influences: classical Hollywood cinema; radio dramas; musical film; zarzuela; comic novel; Philippine mythology

The Golden Age of Philippine cinema, (Note: Film critics Andrea Bandhauer and Michelle Royer (2015) referred the first Golden Age of Philippine cinema as the "studio era of Philippine cinema", dating the period from the 1950s through the early 1960s while Paulo Chua of Esquire magazine referred this era as the "classic Philippine cinema".) in film criticism, is an era in the cinema of the Philippines that developed after the outbreak of World War II in the late 1940s, until the decline of the studio system in the early 1960s. It is a period of artistic breakthrough, international recognitions, establishment of the first award-giving bodies, high annual film production, and a floushing local film industry that made the Philippines the film capital of Asia.

Filmmakers during this era explored themes of nationalism, post-war struggles, cultural identity, and heroism. Films such as Gerardo de Leon's Sisa tackled social injustices and women oppression during the colonial era, Lamberto Avellana's Huk sa Bagong Pamumuhay brought social realism to mainstream cinema, and Juan Tamad Goes to Congress, directed by Manuel Conde, introduced satire as an effective genre in addressing social issues.

Films during this period also began receiving international acclaim, with Manuel Conde's Genghis Khan credited as the first Asian film to be screened at the Venice Film Festival, introducing Philippine cinema to the world. Kandelerong Pilak, directed by Lamberto Avellana, was the first Filipino film shown at the Cannes Film Festival. Gregorio Fernandez took home both Best Picture and Director at the Asian Film Festival for his work in Higit sa Lahat. Other notable films from this period include Ang Sawa sa Lumang Simboryo (1952), Ang Asawa kong Amerikana (1953), Ifugao (1954), Sanda Wong (1955), Anak Dalita (1956), Badjao (1957), and Biyaya ng Lupa (1959).

Film critics and journalists have regarded several actors from this period as one of the greatest in Philippine film history, including Gloria Romero, Eddie Garcia, Dolphy, Charito Solis, Lolita Rodriguez, Nida Blanca, Rosa Rosal, and Rita Gomez. (Note: Other notable actors that debuted in this period (late 1950s) but only started receiving both critical and commercial success in the 1960s onwards include (but not limited to) Fernando Poe Jr., Susan Roces, Amalia Fuentes, Barbara Perez etc.) Other actors who earned international acclaim during this period were Lilia Dizon, Rogelio de la Rosa, Romeo Vasquez, and Rebecca del Rio.

== History ==
=== 1946–1949: Post-war recovery and studio system emergence ===
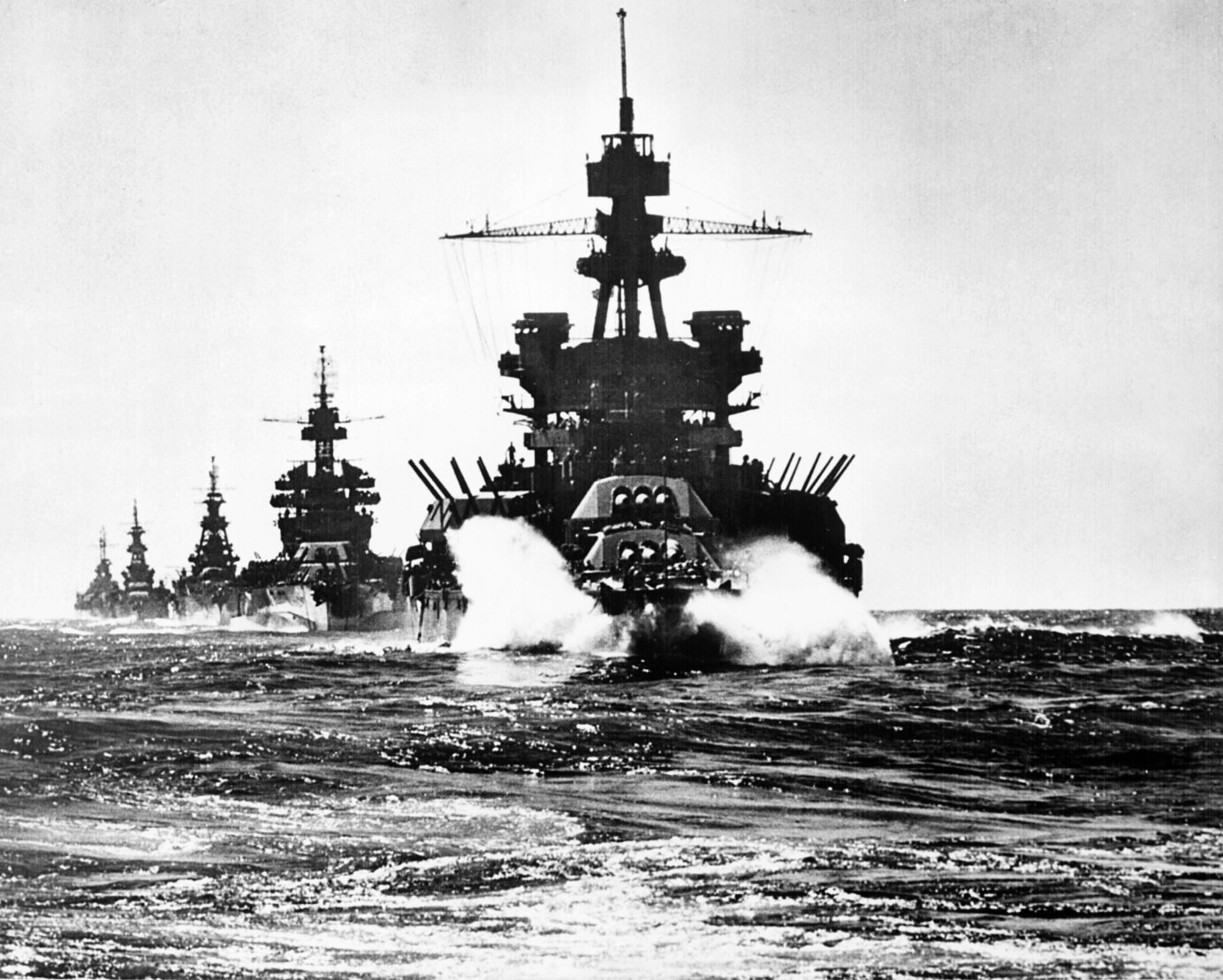
US warships in Lingayen Gulf, 1945

The outbreak of World War II in 1939 severely disrupted the Philippine film industry and completely halted production. After the war, the late 1940s was a time of rebuilding and growth in the Philippines, aided by the U.S. financial assistance and war reparations from Japan. In no time, the film industry slowly recovered from wartime destruction, with studios re-establishing themselves and new ones emerging. From a combined 300 movie houses in the Philippines before the war, the rebuilding of theaters increased and exceeded the former in no time. These studio systems adopted the Hollywood-style studio system, with contract stars, directors, crews, and technicians.

Film outfits that were established in the late 1930s such as Sampaguita Pictures and LVN Pictures, resumed film production in 1946. The latter produced Manuel Conde's Orasang Ginto, the first post-war film released in theaters, while Sampaguita released Octavio Silos' Ulila ng Watawat— followed by three more war films later that year. Also in 1946, Dr. Ciriaco Santiago founded the Premiere Productions, which produced a number of action films throughout the decade and most of Gerardo de Leon's directorial works during the period. The most recent of the four, Lebran Productions was later established in 1949 by Rafael Anton with his associates, targeting both local and various Asian markets by releasing films dubbed in two languages— Filipino and English versions.

=== 1950–1952: Artistic innovation and global breakthrough ===
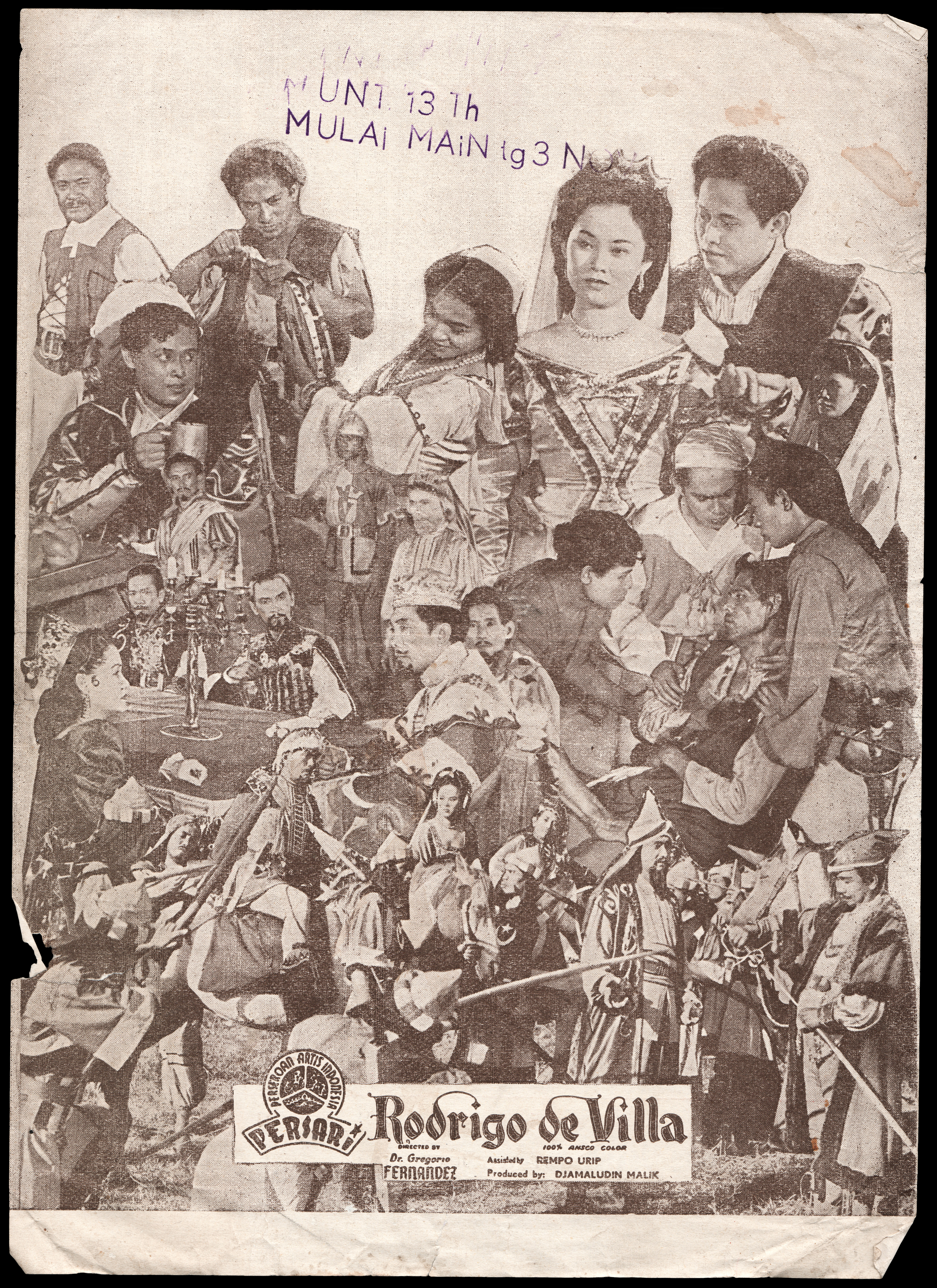
Theatrical poster of Rodrigo de Villa, produced by Philippine-based LVN Pictures and Indonesia-based Persari, distributed by 20th Century Fox.

The first color film to be processed in the Philippines was produced by LVN Pictures in 1950, Nemesio Caravana's Dayang Dayang. Also in 1950, a group of writers from Manila Times Publishing, Co. established the first formal local award-giving body— Maria Clara Awards. Despite its promising run for three consecutive years, the Maria Clara Awards was discontinued due to dissatisfaction with the voting process, which included film columnists and writers, and later prompted calls for a more reliable and professional award-giving body, the FAMAS Awards. Later in 1950, Manuel Conde's Genghis Khan was released in the Philippines. According to Conde, the film was produced for ₱125,000 and garnered positive reviews for its technical innovation upon its screening at the Venice Film Festival. American film and distribution company United Artists, owned by Amazon MGM Studios, bought the distribution rights of the film and it was later dubbed in sixteen languages. It became the first Filipino film to have bought the rights to worldwide distribution by major film studios in the United States.

Film critic Nicanor Tiongson discussed in one of his lectures in 2016 how Conde "opened doors of opportunities for local cinema to be known internationally", stating that he "went beyond the usual narrative, traditional genres and ventured into subject matter that would have been too monumental by the average producer." In January 1951, a fire struck the compound of Sampaguita Pictures and destroyed an estimated ₱5 million worth of properties, including hundreds of film prints and equipments. At the verge of bankruptcy, the film studio released Roberta (1951) starring then child actress Tessie Agana. Upon its release, the film broke all box-office records in the Philippines and became the highest grossing Filipino film of all time. Later in 1951, Gerardo de Leon's Sisa under Premiere Productions was released. Adapted from Dr. Jose Rizal's Noli Me Tangere, the film starred Anita Linda in the title role, which later earned her a Maria Clara Award for Best Actress. The following year, Premiere Productions released the adventure fantasy Ang Sawa sa Lumang Simboryo under the direction of Gerardo de Leon. The film is credited for popularizing action-adventure genres inspired by Filipino folklore and comics. The film also won both Best Picture and Director at the first edition of the FAMAS Awards. In August 1952, LVN Pictures produced Gregorio Fernandez' Rodrigo de Villa, which starred Delia Razon and Mario Montenegro. The film was the first Filipino co-production with a foreign film outfit, Indonesia's Persari Productions, Inc.

=== 1953–1955: Social realism and regional recognition ===
Films with socially relevant themes were the trends during these years, including those that depicted poverty, rural-urban division, and cultural identity. In January 1953, Eddie Romero's romantic comedy film Ang Asawa kong Amerikana was released. Produced by Sampaguita Pictures, Luciano Carlos won Best Screenplay for the film at the Southeast Asian International Film Festival in Japan. In August 1953, LVN Pictures produced Lamberto Avellana's Huk sa Bagong Pamumuhay as part of the propaganda effort of the government against the expansion of communism in the Philippines. The film pioneered the use of themes such as social realism, land reforms and rural poverty that were rarely explored in mainstream cinema at that time.

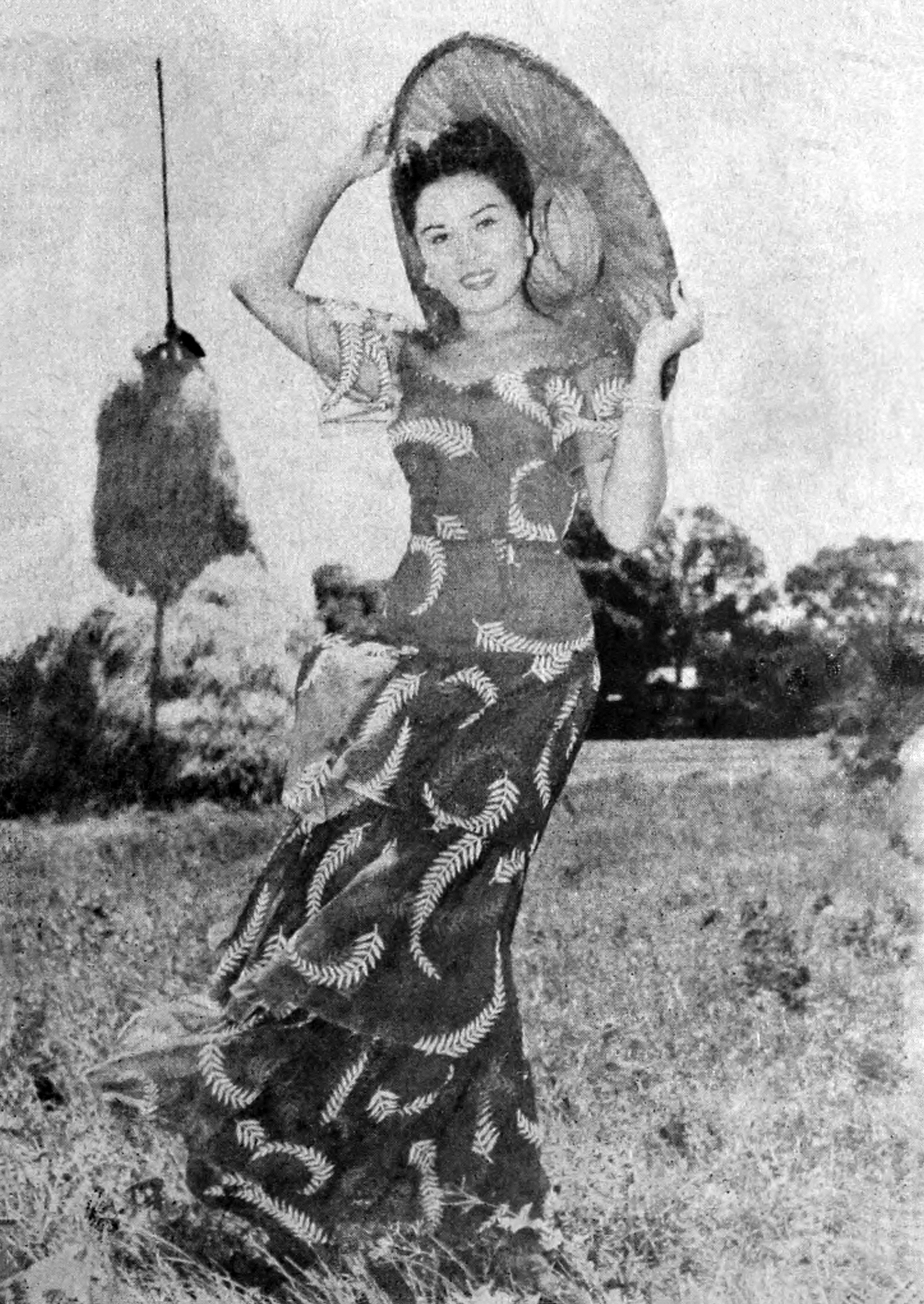
Lilia Dizon won Best Actress at the Asia-Pacific Film Festival in Cambodia for the film Kandelerong Pilak.

In June 1954, Ifugao was released. Directed by Gerardo de Leon under Premiere Productions, the film starred Efren Reyes Sr. and Leila Morena. Gloria Sevilla received a nomination for Best Actress while Reyes, for his role in the film, won Best Actor at the second Asian Film Festival in Singapore, becoming the first Filipino actor to do so. The film also won two more awards at the film festival, including Best Director and Best Screenplay. Later that year, LVN Pictures produced Lamberto Avellana's Kandelerong Pilak which starred Lilia Dizon and Teody Belarmino. The film received wide critical acclaim and was the first Filipino film to be shown at the Cannes Film Festival. Dizon's performance in the film also helped secure the Best Actress award at the Asia-Pacific Film Festival in Cambodia, presented to her by the Prince of Cambodia who would later become the King, Narodom Sihanouk. The following year, the romantic drama Higit sa Lahat was released. Produced by LVN Pictures under the direction of Gregorio Fernandez, the film starred Emma Alegre and Rogelio de la Rosa. The film received wide critical acclaim and took home Best Picture and Best Actor for de la Rosa at the Asian Film Festival in Hong Kong.

In September 1955, Hong Kong-based film companies Golden City and Southeast Asian Film Company produced Gerardo de Leon's action film Sanda Wong. Co-produced and distributed by Premiere Productions, the film featured advanced visual effects such as stop motion and layered imagery. The 1950s was also a productive period for the Visayan cinema, also called Cebuano cinema. Thirteen regional film outfits produced an average of eight to thirteen films a year. The first documented account of a regional film being shown in Manila was Salingsing sa Kasakit, which was dubbed in Filipino.

=== 1956-1959: Challenges and decline of the studio system ===
Due to poor return of investments, Lebran Productions ceased operations in 1956. On March 20, 1956, LVN Pictures produced Anak Dalita (1956) under the direction of Lamberto Avellana and starred Rosa Rosal and Tony Santos. The film won the Golden Harvest Award at the Asian Film Festival in Hong Kong, becoming the first Filipino film to achieve it. The following year, the adventure drama Badjao competed at the Tokyo Film Festival with Avellana, Rosal and Santos returning as the director and lead actors, respectively. The film took home four awards at the Asian Film Festival including Best Director for Avellana, Best Screenplay for Rilf Bayer, Best Cinematography for Mike Accion, and Best Editing for Gregorio Carballo.

Around this period, television began to compete with cinema, with emerging stations such as DZBB-TV and ABS-CBN (formerly Bolinao Electronics Corporation) airing imported shows and local variety programs. In February 1958, Amalia Fuentes, Romeo Vasquez, and Rosa Mia topbilled the romantic drama Ako ang Maysala directed by Armando Garces. Produced by Vera- Perez Productions, a subsidiary production arm of Sampaguita Pictures, Vasquez' performance earned him a Best Actor award at the Asian Film Festival. In May 1958, Gregorio Fernandez' Malvarosa was released. The film starred Charito Solis, Leroy Salvador, Carlos Padilla Jr., Eddie Rodriguez, and Rebecca del Rio, for which she won Best Supporting Actress at the Asian Film Festival. Solis was also nominated in the Best Actress category but lost to Lin Dai from Hong Kong by one point.

In September 1959, Manuel Conde continued the Juan Tamad film series with the release of Juan Tamad Goes to Congress, produced by LVN Pictures. The film series is credited for introducing satire as a viable genre, using humor to address various social issues, which film critic Dr. Nicanor G. Tiongson opined in a 2016 lecture at the University of the Philippines, "radical and very dangerous at that time." By the end of the decade, the remaining major studios, including the smaller units, began facing rising production costs and labor disputes that further strained studio finances. The tensions between studio management and film workers led to strikes and disruptions.

=== Early 1960s: End of the era ===
This period saw an artistic decline in films and rampant commercialism. Film critics Annette Kuhn and Guy Westwell wrote in their book A Dictionary of Film Studies (2020) that the "under-capitalized Filipino-produced films struggled to compete with imports from the US, Europe, and Mexico." In 2012, German writer Tilman Baumgärtel argued that the decline of the studio system can also be attributed to the rise of Deegar Cinema Inc. in 1953, "which encourage independent producers to borrow money from its production fund." As a result, several major stars and technicians of the period "bailed out of the big four", started their own production companies and offered bigger salaries "since they did not have a high operating costs of maintaining studios." LVN Pictures ceased film production in 1961 and shifted to post production such as color processing laboratory. The collapse of the studio system in the 1960s led to an acceleration of filmmaking activities among independent companies, ushering a new era in Philippine cinema.

== Style ==
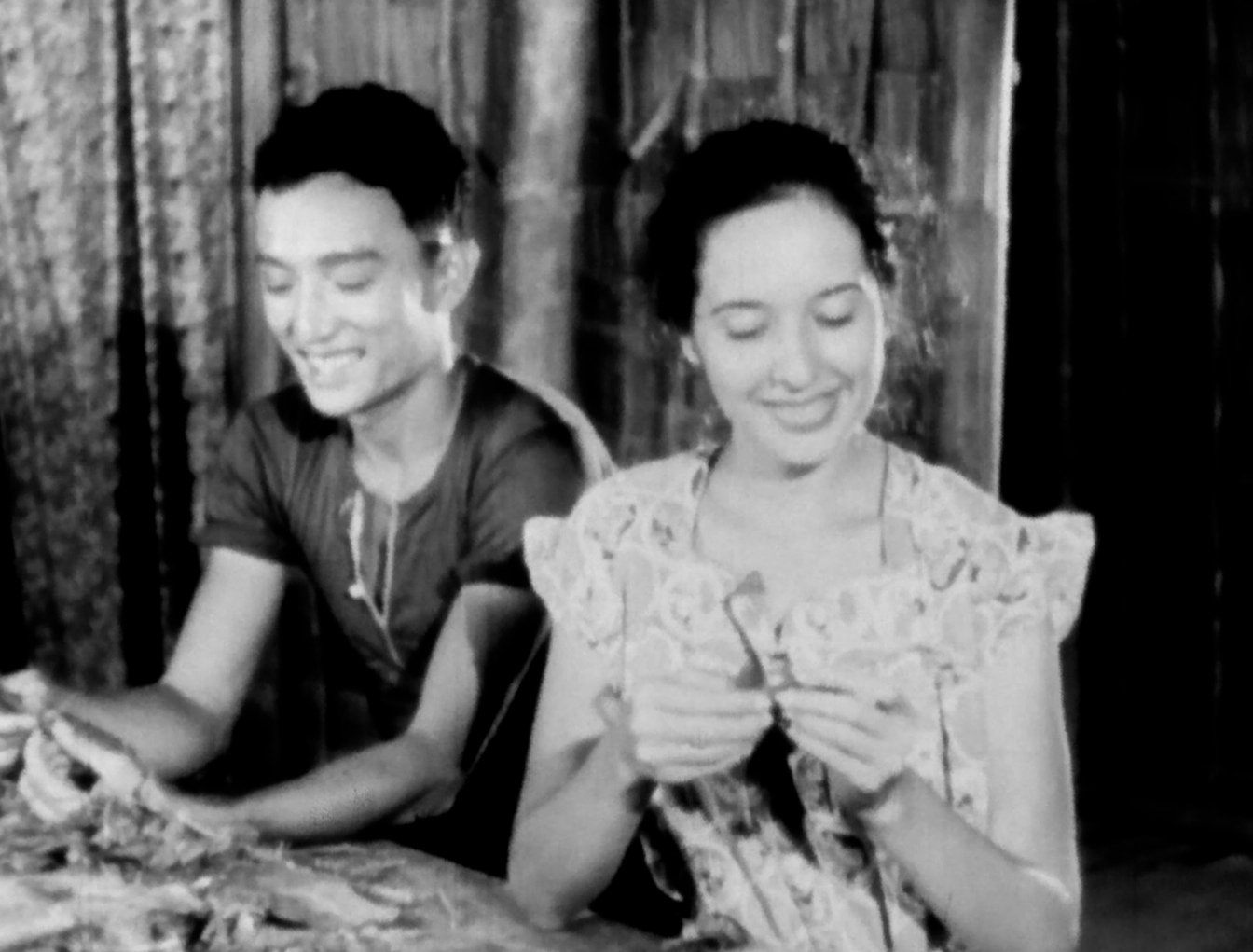
Dolphy and Gloria Romero in the romantic comedy Dalagang Ilocana, 1954

Film historian Nick Deocampo wrote in his book Early Cinema in Asia (2017) the profound influence of Hollywood in the imagination of early Filipino audiences and how it became the reference point of Philippine cinema "in terms of theme, style, and representational strategies". Gerardo de Leon, one of the prominent filmmakers of the period, was described as a "master of composition... of light and shadow." Another important filmmaker of the period was Manuel Conde, noted for maximizing the available equipments despite the limited budget. During the production of the historical drama Genghis Khan (1950), Conde "didn’t have enough money to rent big studio lights. So he lit the village scene with the headlights of jeepneys." Botong Francisco, a muralist who worked closely with Conde "for the costumes and designs of his movies", was also noted for setting the "benchmark for costumed epics of the era".

In her book Philippine Studies: Have We Gone Beyond St. Louis? (2008), film critic Priscelina Patajo-Legasto stated that the "period of stability [that] lasted throughout the 1950s... enabled the production of occasional Hollywood-style spectacles and neorealist inspired dramas". Film critic Ahmed Sayeed wrote in his book You Could Be the Winner (2019) that "the emergence of a more artistic and mature films, and a significant improvement in cinematic techniques" marked a golden age for Philippine cinema. Film critics Nayoung Aimee Kwon, Takushi Odagiri, and Moonim Baek stated in their book Theorizing Colonial Cinema (2022) that Filipino filmmakers began revisiting the war through a number of narrative films "aimed at both local and foreign audiences" and made use of the "wartime setting to reflect on past and present forms of Filipino nationalism".

Comedies, drama, musicals, and serialized novels in local comics that were adapted to screen, were the leading screen themes of the 1950s.

== Legacy ==
The classical Philippine cinema emerged in the 1950s at the time when filmmakers were rebuilding the industry, taking inspiration from Hollywood-inspired techniques with Filipino style of storytelling. The emergence of four major studios during this period produced a total of an estimated 350 films per year, which was reportedly only second to Japan in Asia-Pacific region. In 2013, Japanese film critic Daisuke Miyao stated in his book titled The Oxford Handbook of Japanese Cinema that other than Japan, the Philippines had the "most advanced system and technologies" in all of Asia during this period.

Four filmmakers of the era has been conferred with the highest national recognition for any artist, the National Artists of the Philippines, including Gerardo de Leon, Manuel Conde, Lamberto Avellana, and Eddie Romero. Film archivist Teddy Co opined that "Gerardo de Leon's body of work represents the very best of what Filipino artist can and should aspire for." Inquirer Entertainment credited Lamberto Avellana for being one of the "first Filipino filmmakers to use the motion picture camera to establish a point-of-view, a move that revolutionized the techniques of film narration." Filmmaker Jose Javier Reyes opined that "we must acknowledge the importance of Avellana and Conde, and of Gerry de Leon... and all the others who have built that bridge so we can cross generations and reach this point."

=== Critics' lists ===
Publisher	Year	Listicle	Result(s)	Placement	Ref.
Daily Tribune	2025	25 most significant Filipino movies of all time	Anak Dalita (1956)	No. 10	
Daily Tribune	2025	25 most significant Filipino movies of all time	Biyaya ng Lupa (1959)	No. 16	
Daily Tribune	2025	25 most significant Filipino movies of all time	Genghis Khan (1950)	No. 18	
Directors’ Guild of the Philippines Inc. and Yes! magazine	2004	The 15 Best Filipino Actresses of All Time	Nida Blanca	Included	
Directors’ Guild of the Philippines Inc. and Yes! magazine	2004	The 15 Best Filipino Actresses of All Time	Rita Gomez	Included	
Directors’ Guild of the Philippines Inc. and Yes! magazine	2004	The 15 Best Filipino Actresses of All Time	Lolita Rodriguez	Included	
Directors’ Guild of the Philippines Inc. and Yes! magazine	2004	The 15 Best Filipino Actresses of All Time	Gloria Romero	Included	
Directors’ Guild of the Philippines Inc. and Yes! magazine	2004	The 15 Best Filipino Actresses of All Time	Rosa Rosal	Included	
Directors’ Guild of the Philippines Inc. and Yes! magazine	2004	The 15 Best Filipino Actresses of All Time	Charito Solis	Included	
Far Out magazine	2021	A guide to Filipino cinema: 10 essential films from the Philippines	Sisa (1951)	Included	
Far Out magazine	2021	A guide to Filipino cinema: 10 essential films from the Philippines	Anak Dakita (1956)	Included	
Far Out magazine	2021	A guide to Filipino cinema: 10 essential films from the Philippines	Malvarosa (1958)	Included	
Far Out magazine	2021	A guide to Filipino cinema: 10 essential films from the Philippines	Biyaya ng Lupa (1959)	Included	
S Magazine	2006	Philippine Cinema's 15 Best Actresses of All Time	Lolita Rodriguez	No. 3	
S Magazine	2006	Philippine Cinema's 15 Best Actresses of All Time	Charito Solis	No. 4	
S Magazine	2006	Philippine Cinema's 15 Best Actresses of All Time	Gloria Romero	No. 6	
S Magazine	2006	Philippine Cinema's 15 Best Actresses of All Time	Nida Blanca	No. 7	
S Magazine	2006	Philippine Cinema's 15 Best Actresses of All Time	Rita Gomez	No. 12	
Tatler Asia	2019	10 Of The Most Iconic Films That Shaped Philippine Cinema	Prinsipe Amante (1951)	Included	

== Major figures ==
According to various sources, the following filmmakers, producers, and actors are the major figures during the first Golden Age of Philippine cinema. They have greatly impacted and contributed to local cinema during this period.

=== Directors ===
- Richard Abelardo (1902–1993)
- Gregorio Fernandez (1904–1973)
- Manuel Silos (1906–1988)
- Gerardo de Leon (1913–1988)
- Lamberto V. Avellana (1915–1991)
- Manuel Conde (1915–1985)
- Eddie Romero (1924–2013)

=== Producers ===
- Narcisa de León (1877–1966)
- José Roxas Perez (1915–1975)
- Nene Vera-Perez (1917–2014)
- Cirio H. Santiago (1936–2008)

=== Actors ===
- Leopoldo Salcedo (1912–1998)
- Rogelio dela Rosa (1916–1986)
- Carmen Rosales (1917–1991)
- Fred Montilla (1919–2003)
- Tony Santos Sr. (1920–1988)
- Pancho Magalona (1921–1998)
- Jaime de la Rosa (1921–1992)
- Armando Goyena (1922–2011)
- Paraluman (1923–2009)
- Anita Linda (1924–2020)
- Efren Reyes Sr. (1924–1968)
- Erlinda Cortes (1924–2015)
- Ric Rodrigo (1924-1996)
- Rosa Mia (1925–2006)
- Lilia Dizon (1927–2020)
- Alicia Vergel (1927–1992)
- Rosa Rosal (1928–2025)
- Dolphy (1928–2012)
- Tita Duran (1928–1990)
- Nestor de Villa (1928–2004)
- Mario Montenegro (1928–1988)
- Rebecca del Rio (1929–2010)
- Vic Silayan (1929–1987)
- Eddie Garcia (1929–2019)
- Bella Flores (1929–2013)
- Armida Siguion-Reyna (1930-2019)
- Delia Razon (1931–2025)
- Tessie Quintana (1931–1969)
- Leroy Salvador (1931–1991)
- Gloria Sevilla (1932–2022)
- Eddie Rodriguez (1932–2001)
- Juancho Gutierrez (1932–2005)
- Gloria Romero (1933–2025)
- Emma Alegre (1933–2016)
- Norma Vales (1933–2013)
- Lolita Rodriguez (1935–2016)
- Charito Solis (1935–1998)
- Rita Gomez (1935–1990)
- Nida Blanca (1936–2001)
- Zaldy Zshornack (1937–2002)
- Jose Mari Gonzales (1938–2019)
- Bernard Bonnin (1938–2009)
- Marlene Dauden (born 1938)
- Romeo Vasquez (1939–2017)
- Fernando Poe Jr. (1939–2004)
- Amalia Fuentes (1940–2019)
- Lou Salvador Jr. (1940–2008)
- Susan Roces (1941–2022)
- Lito Legaspi (1941–2019)
- Eddie Gutierrez (born 1942)
- Tessie Agana (born 1942)

== See also ==
- Asian cinema
- East Asian cinema
- Southeast Asian cinema
- Film awards in the Philippines
- Classical Hollywood cinema
- Golden Age of Argentine cinema
- Golden Age of Mexican cinema
