= 1960 FAMAS Awards =

Annual Filipino film awards ceremony

8th FAMAS Awards
- Date: March 5, 1960
- Site: Philippines

Highlights
- Best Picture: Biyaya ng Lupa (LVN PIctures)
- Most awards: Kamandag (Sampaguita Pictures) (7 wins)
- Most nominations: Biyaya ng Lupa (12 nominations)

The 8th Filipino Academy of Movie Arts and Sciences Awards Night was held on March 5, 1960, for the outstanding achievements of Filipino films for the year 1959.

Biyaya ng Lupa of LVN Pictures was the most nominated film of the year with 12 nominations. However, it only manages to win 2 awards including the most coveted FAMAS Award for Best Picture. Kamandag of Sampaguita Pictures won the most awards (7 wins), including best actor (Van de Leon), Best director (Jose De Villa) and Best Supporting Actress (Marlene Dauden).

Biyaya ng Lupa was also screened and nominated for Golden Bear at the 10th Berlin International Film Festival

== Awards ==
=== Major Awards ===
Winners are listed first and highlighted with boldface.

Best Picture	Best Director
**Biyaya ng Lupa — LVN Pictures**; Cry Freedom — Banaue Pictures; Kamandag — Sampaguita Pictures; Kilabot sa Makiling — Sampaguita Pictures; Ang Maton — Premiere Productions	**Jose De Villa — Kamandag**; Manuel Silos — Biyaya ng Lupa; Lamberto Avellana — Cry Freedom; Armando Garces — Kilabot sa Makiling; Cesar Gallardo — Ang Maton
Best Actor	Best Actress
**Van de Leon — Kamandag**; Leroy Salvador — Biyaya ng Lupa; Tony Santos — Biyaya ng Lupa; Pancho Magalona — Cry Freedom; Johnny Montiero — Ang Matapang Lamang; Efren Reyes — Ang Maton	**Charito Solis — Kundiman ng Lahi**; Rosa Rosal — Alaalang Banal: Gloria Romero — Ikaw ang aking Buhay; Rita Gomez — Kidnapped; Lolita Rodriguez — Kilabot sa Makiling
Best Supporting Actor	Best Supporting Actress
**Eddie Garcia — Tanikalang Apoy**; Pablo Guevarra — Anghel sa Lansangan; Tito Galla — Kidnapped; Joseph de Cordova — Kundiman ng Lahi; Ronal Remy — Ang Maton	**Marlene Daudén — Kamandag**; Marita Zobel — Biyaya ng Lupa; Rosa Mia — Kamandag; Bella Flores — Kilabot sa Makiling; Rosa Aguirre — Kundiman ng Lahi; Etang Discher — Tanikalang Apoy
Best in Screenplay	Best Story
**Ding m. De Jesus — Kamandag**; Celso Al. Carunungan, Pablo Naval — Biyaya ng Lupa; Rolf Bayer — Cry Freedom; Bert Mendoza — Kilabot sa Makiling; Bert R. Mendoza — Condenado; Augusto Buenaventura, Bert Dueñas Jr. — Ang Maton	**Celso Al. Carunungan — Biyaya ng Lupa**; Fausto J. Galauran — Ikaw ang aking buhay; Ding M. De Jesus — Kamandag; Antonio de Joya — Kidnapped; Augusto Buenaventura — Ang matapang Lamang
Best Sound Engineering	Best Musical Score
**Joseph Straight — Kamandag**; Flaviano Villareal — Cry Freedom; Angelo Larraga — Kidnapped; Demetrio de Santos — Ang matapang lamang; — Biyaya ng Lupa	**Constancio de Guzman — Ikaw ang aking buhay**; Juan Silos Jr. — Biyaya ng lupa; Francisco Buencamino Jr.— Kundiman ng lahi; Tony Maiquez — Ang maton; Danny Holmsen — Tanikalang Apoy
Best Cinematography	Best Editing
**Felipe Santiago — Kamdag**; Hermo Santos — Ikaw ang aking Buhay; Mike Accion — Kundiman ng Lahi; Steve Perezn — Kidnapped; Arsenio Dizon — Ang Maton	**Jose Tarnate — Kamandag**; Enrique Jarlego — Biyaya ng lupa; Fely Crisostomo — Cry Freedom; Gregorio Carballo — Kundiman ng lahi; Augusto Salvador — Ang Maton

=== Special Awardee ===
- **International Prestige Award of Merit**
  - **El Legado**
