= Korea (1952 film) =

1952 film

- Directed by: Lamberto V. Avellana
- Story by: Benigno Aquino Jr.
- Produced by: Dña. Narcisa B. Vda. de León
- Production company: LVN Pictures
- Release date: March 31, 1952
- Country: Philippines
- Languages: Filipino; English

Korea is a 1952 Philippine war film about the Korean War directed by Lamberto V. Avellana. Produced by LVN Pictures, the film is considered to be lost. Benigno Aquino Jr. wrote the script who based it on his experiences on the war as a correspondent.

== Cast ==
- Jamie de la Rosa
- Tony Santos
- Alfonso Carvajal
- Gil de Leon
- Johnny Reyes
- Oscar Obligacion
- Arturo Moran
- Leroy Salvador
- Nida Blanca
- Mario Roldan
- Milagros Naval
- Miguel Lopez
