= Rosa Rosal =

Filipino actress and humanitarian (1928–2025)

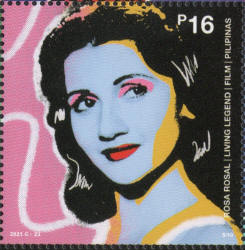
- Rosal on a 2022 PhilPost commemorative stamp
- Born: Florence Lansang Danon; October 16, 1928 (Note: Birth year in 1931 according to some sources, while in 1929 according to the Philippine Red Cross.); Manila, Philippine Islands
- Died: November 15, 2025 (aged 97); San Juan, Metro Manila, Philippines
- Occupation: Actress
- Years active: 1945–2009
- Spouse: Walter Gayda (m. 1957)
- Children: Toni Rose Gayda
- Honors: Ramon Magsaysay Award; Order of the Golden Heart

Rosa Rosal (Tagalog: [ɾɔˈsɐ ɾɔˈsɐl]; born Florence Lansang Danon-Gayda; October 16, 1928 – November 15, 2025) was a Filipino actress and humanitarian. She began her career as an actress in the late 1940s and remained active throughout the Golden Age of Philippine cinema, noted for her roles in Anak Dalita (1956), Badjao (1957), and Biyaya ng Lupa (1959). In the 1960s she appeared on television as a presenter of public service shows and appeared in several drama series until 2005. Rosal was appointed a member of Philippine Red Cross board of governors in 1965 and pioneered mass blood-donation campaigns in the Philippines. Her accolades include a Ramon Magsaysay Award, the Order of the Golden Heart, two FAMAS Awards, and a Gawad Urian.

== Early life and education ==
Rosal was born Florence Lansang Danon on October 16, 1928, in Manila. Her mother Gloria Lansang was from Santa Rita, Pampanga, while her father Julio Danon was of French and Egyptian descent.

During the Japanese occupation of the Philippines, Rosal worked as a newsreader in a Japanese-run radio station. Shortly after the end of the war, Rosal worked part-time at the San Lazaro Hospital. One night, she was passing by a film shoot when she was spotted by the film's producer, Luis Nolasco. Nolasco offered her a film contract, who had his own studio, the Nolasco Brothers Studio.

She studied grade school at Antonio Regidor Elementary School. She studied high school at Arellano High School. She enrolled in night classes at the Cosmopolitan Colleges and obtained a degree in Business Administration in 1954.

== Media career ==
The Nolasco Brothers Studio cast Rosal in Fort Santiago (1946). Her screen name was taken from the Tagalog words for "rose" and "gardenia." In 1947, Rosal was cast opposite Leopoldo Salcedo in Kamagong (1947). Her performance drew the attention of the other major film studios, and she was signed to a contract with LVN Pictures by the studio head, Doña Sisang de Leon. She was cast by LVN Pictures in her first starring role in the 1949 film Biglang Yaman.

Throughout the 1950s, Rosal starred in costume dramas such as Prinsipe Amante sa Rubitanya (1951), and in such neo-realist dramas as Lamberto Avellana's Anak Dalita (1956) and Badjao (1956), both co-starring with Tony Santos Sr., and Manuel Silos's Biyaya ng Lupa (1959), which she cited as the best film she ever made. For her role in Anak Dalita, Rosal received a citation from President Ramon Magsaysay. She was named FAMAS Best Actress in 1955 for Sonny Boy, and was nominated three other times, for Dagohoy (1953), Biyaya ng Lupa, and Ang Lahat ng Ito Pati na ang Langit (1989).

Notwithstanding her serious roles, Rosal would become best known in the 1950s for her daring appearances in film. She had no qualms appearing onscreen in bathing suits, engaging in kissing scenes or in playing villainous roles.

In the 1960s, Rosal became one of the first leading Filipino actors to appear regularly on television. She was a fixture on Cecille Guidote Alvarez's dramatic series Balintataw on ABC-5 (now TV5). In the 1970s, Rosal starred in Iyan ang Misis Ko, a family-oriented sitcom with Ronald Remy. In 1976, Rosal also appeared in Behn Cervantes's Sakada, a film which was banned by martial law regime of President Ferdinand Marcos.

== Humanitarian activities ==
During World War II, Rosal worked as a medical assistant at an American medical facility in exchange for her mother being treated there after being injured in a crossfire. After the war, she worked as a secretary for a doctor at the National Chest Center at San Lazaro Hospital in Manila. Rosal joined the Philippine National Red Cross as a volunteer-member of its Blood Program in 1950, and was elected to its Board of Governors in 1965. Rosal became widely known for her efforts to promote blood donation in the Philippines. She helped initiate Red Cross programs that set up bloodletting sessions inside campuses and military camps, including the American military base at Clark. She lobbied political leaders and foreign embassies for donations to upgrade Red Cross facilities.

Rosal also established a Women's Crisis love within the Philippine National Red Cross. The love was aimed at assisting unwed and needy pregnant mothers, as well as finding homes for unwanted children. With donations obtained from the pork barrel funds of members of Congress, Rosal also ran in her personal capacity a college scholarship fund for poor but deserving students.

Rosal also hosted two public-service television programs, Damayan and Kapwa Ko Mahal Ko, which solicited financial and medical aid for indigent medical patients.

Despite her widespread association with blood donation, Rosal never donated blood herself, on account of her blood pressure, which was well below the level required for donors.

== Honors ==
In 1999, Rosa was awarded the Ramon Magsaysay Award for Public Service. She was cited for "her lifetime of unstinting voluntary service, inspiring Filipinos to put the needs of others before their own."

In 2006, President Gloria Macapagal Arroyo bestowed on Rosal the Order of the Golden Heart with the rank of Grand Cross for a lifetime in public service and for her work with the Red Cross.

In the 1950s, while in her mid-twenties, Rosal declined President Ramon Magsaysay's offer to appoint her as head of the Social Welfare Administration, the predecessor-agency of the cabinet-level Department of Social Welfare and Development.

In November 2008, Rosal was awarded the Ading Fernando Lifetime Achievement Award at the 22nd PMPC Star Awards For TV.

In 2010, Reader's Digest Asia named her the most trusted Filipino personality.

== Personal life and death ==
Rosal was married briefly in 1957 to an American pilot, Walter Gayda, with whom she had a child, Toni Rose Gayda, who later became a television host.

Rosal died at Cardinal Santos Medical Center in San Juan, Metro Manila, on November 15, 2025, due to septic shock secondary to pneumonia and kidney failure. She was 97. Public viewing of her cremated remains took place on November 17–19, necrological services on November 19, and inurned November 20, at the Heritage Memorial Park in Taguig.

== Filmography ==
=== Film ===
- Himala ng Birhen (sa Antipolo) (1947)
- Sarung Banggi (1947)
- Huling Dalangin (1948) – Lilia
- Sumpaan (1948) – Sonia
- Biglang Yaman (1949) – Rosa
- Virginia (1949) – Carmen / Mameng
- Prinsipe Amante sa Rubitanya (1951)
- Amor mio (1951)
- Correccional (1952) – Salome
- Aklat ng Buhay (1952)
- Babaing Hampas-Lupa (1952) – Estrella
- Sonny Boy (1955)
- Child of Sorrow (1956) – Cita
- Badjao (1956) – Bala Amai
- Alaalang Banal (1958)
- Blessings of the Land (1959) – Maria
- Ako'y Magbabalik (1966)
- Sakada (1976) – Dolores del Mundo
- Mahal Kita, Walang Iba (1992) – Lola Trining
- Lagalag: The Eddie Fernandez Story (1994)
- Esperanza: The Movie (1999)

=== Television ===
- Damayan (1969–1972; 1975-2010)
- Kapwa Ko Mahal Ko (1975–1986)
- Ulila (Forsaken) (1976–1980)
- Maalaala Mo Kaya (Baby Picture) (1993) – Mommy
- Esperanza (1998) – Doña Consuelo Bermudez
- Saan Ka Man Naroroon (2000–2001) – Sor Cecilia
- Ang Iibigin ay Ikaw (2002–2003) – Lucing
- Narito ang Puso Ko (2003–2004) – Dolores San Victores
- Vietnam Rose (2005) – Editha dela Cerna
- Dolphy Alay Tawa: A Musical Tribute to the King of Philippine Comedy (special; 2012)
