= Rita Gomez =

Filipino actress and writer (born 1935)

- Born: Rita Gomez; May 22, 1935; Marinduque, Philippines
- Died: May 9, 1990 (aged 54); New York City, New York, U.S.
- Occupations: Actress; writer
- Years active: 1951–1981, 1985
- Spouse: Ric Rodrigo (m. 1954; div. 1965)

Rita Gomez (May 22, 1935 – May 9, 1990), often billed as Miss Rita Gomez, was a Filipino actress whose career spanned over three decades. Known for her versatile work on screen and stage, she was one of the highest paid leading dramatic actresses from 1950s to early 1970s. Her accolades include two FAMAS Awards, a Luna Award, and a Manila Film Festival Award.

== Life and career ==
=== 1935–1950: Early life ===
Rita Gomez was born on May 22, 1935, in Marinduque, Philippines to Angel Gomez and Luciana Arce. Her mother worked as a mining engineer while her father worked as a meat vendor. After his father died in 1943, her family experienced financial difficulties. She attended the University of Santo Tomas, where she majored journalism. Gomez revealed that she used to skip classes occasionally to visit film outfits and get autographs from her favorite stars. In one of her visits at the Premiere Productions, she was asked to appear as a background actor.

=== 1951-1959: Breakthrough and stardom ===
Gomez made her first screen appearance in 1951 as a background actor in Fernando Poe Sr.'s Nanay. She was formally introduced the following year in Gerry de Leon's Sawa sa Lumang Simboryo where she received her first FAMAS Award nomination. In 1953, she signed an exclusive contract with Sampaguita Pictures and was cast in Eddie Romero's Maldita, her first lead role. Gomez was the first choice of writer Francisco Conching for the title role, and became one of the highest-grossing films of the year. In the following years, she was typecast in several antagonist roles, playing characters with redemption arcs including Reyna Bandida (1953), and Society Girl (1956). She was next paired with Fred Montilla in Conrado Conde's Via Dolorosa. For her portrayal of a martyred wife, she received her second FAMAS Award nomination and first in a leading role.

Gomez next appeared in Rubi-Rosa (1957) where she played the titular dual roles. Mar S. Torres, director of the film, praised her portrayal, stating "Rita’s dual characterization was so convincing that there were times I could not believe that only one actress was portraying the two roles." She was paired with Luis Gonzales in several films during this period including Pasang Krus, Isang Milyong Kasalanan (both in 1957), Tatlong Ilaw sa Dambana, Talipandas (both in 1958), for which she was awarded her first FAMAS Award for Best Actress, and Kidnapped (1959), which earned Gomez her fourth FAMAS Award for Best Actress nomination and fifth overall.

=== 1960–1979: Continued success ===
Gomez continued to play unconventional roles and was cast as a prostitute in Armando Garces' Tatlong Magdalena opposite Carmen Rosales and Mila del Sol.

In 1971, Gomez was cast as Paloma, a nightclub stripper-turned-actress in Ishmael Bernal's directorial debut Pagdating sa Dulo. The film was listed by the Manunuri ng Pelikulang Pilipino as one of the best films of the 1970s and was first of her many collaborations with Bernal.

=== 1980–1989: Later career and retirement ===
On February 29, 1980, Gomez co-starred with Susan Roces, Romeo Vasquez, and Eddie Garcia in Marilou Diaz-Abaya's directorial debut Tanikala. For her performance, she received her third and final nomination for a FAMAS Award for Best Supporting Actress. Later that year, she appeared in Pablo Gomez's Bubot na Bayabas, her last film role before taking a hiatus. Gomez returned to acting in 1985 through Ishmael Bernal's erotic drama Gamitin Mo Ako. The film initially received negative reviews from critics upon its release for its "sexual themes that were considered taboo" during that time.

On November 7, 1989, Ishmael Bernal directed the tribute show entitled "Tribute to Ms. Rita Gomez" which took place in Los Angeles.

== Personal life and death ==
Gomez was married to actor Ric Rodrigo in 1954. Ronald Bregendahl, the eldest of her five children, revealed in a Pep.ph interview in April 2025 that he was only five years old when his parents separated.

Gomez died of lung cancer on May 9, 1990, in New York, at the age of 54. A year prior to her death, she was reportedly "under Lea Rama's fold", one of the wealthiest Filipino women in the city, while Gomez was taking chemotherapy sessions. Following her death, Gomez's career has been celebrated through various tribute shows. In 1996, the Film Academy of the Philippines paid tribute to Gomez, including other notable actors, at the 14th Luna Awards. In 2005, Nora Aunor performed a medley of Filipino songs as a tribute to departed stars, including Gomez, at the El Dorado Convention Center in Reno, Nevada.

== Public image and reception ==
I have a welter of experience to draw from in my offbeat characterizations. For my sad roles, I have only to remember the times we hardly had enough to eat.

— Gomez on acting (1959)

Gomez has been named one of the greatest Filipino actresses of all time by various sources. Writing for Philippines Free Press, Jose Quirino described Gomez as "local moviedom's most versatile actress", praising her ability to "shift from comedy to heavy drama to off-beat characterizations" while Mel Tobias of Manila Bulletin named her "the most distinguished actress of her era". Nestor Torre of Inquirer Entertainment described Gomez as an actress "ahead of her time" for playing edgier and liberated characters at a time when the industry favored sweet actresses. Gomez was also one of the highest paid actress during the Golden Age of Philippine cinema, earning ₱7,000 per film.

Gomez was a multilingual, a fluent of English and Spanish languages, as well as French and Italian. She was admired for her intelligence and eloquence. A prolific writer, she maintained a column in The Filipino Express, a newspaper published in Jersey City and enjoyed writing sonnets and was a frequent guest in civic and professional clubs, gaining a large following of scholars and educators. Actress Celia Rodriguez described Gomez as a "brilliant" person, stating that "there had never been any actress in Philippine cinema as intelligent as her–to this day." On June 26, 2002, Milflores Publishing launched a book titled Bongga ka 'Day! Pinoy Gay Quotes to Live by, which contain several "pithy sayings and memorable lines" by Gomez and other personalities.

== Acting credits ==
=== Film ===
Rita Gomez's film credits with year of release, film titles and roles
Year	Title	Role	Notes	Ref(s).
1952	Ang Sawa sa Lumang Simboryo	Marta		
1953	Agilang Itim			
1953	Mister Kasintahan		Guest appearance	
1953	Maldita			
1953	Reyna Bandida			
1954	Milyonarya at Hampas Lupa			
1954	Anak ng Espada			
1956	Society Girl			
1956	Senyorita de Kampanilya			
1956	Via Dolorosa			
1956	Kontra Partido			
1957	Pasang Krus			
1957	Isang Milyong Kasalanan			
1957	Mga Anak ng Diyos	Esperanza		
1957	Diyosa	Diyosa		
1957	Batang Bangkusay			
1957	Rubi-Rosa	Rubi/Rosa		
1958	Mga Reyna ng Vicks	Rita Villamor		
1958	Talipandas	Esperanza		
1958	Tatlong Ilaw ng Dambana			
1959	Pitong Pagsisisi			
1959	Tanikalang Apoy			
1959	Kamandag			
1959	Kidnapped			
1960	Double Cross			
1960	Ginang Hukom		Segment: "Paglipas ng Dilim"	
1960	Kaming Makasalanan			
1960	7 Amores		Segment: "Igorot Story"	
1960	Tatlong Magdalena			
1960	Limang Misteryo ng Krus			
1961	Apat na Yugto ng Buhay			
1961	Ito Ba ang Aking Ina	Daria		
1961	Karugtong ng Kahapon			
1961	Sa Linggo ang Bola			
1962	The Big Broadcast			
1962	Magbayad ang May-utang			
1963	Mga batong Hiyas	Opalo		
1963	Pitong Kabanalan ng Isang Makasalanan			
1963	Anak, ang Iyong Ina!	Conchita		
1963	Cara Cruz			
1963	Balisong 29			
1965	Diwata ng Gabi			
1966	Makasalanan			
1966	Laman ng Aking Laman			
1968	Liku-likong Landas			
1969	Vengadora			
1969	The Mad Generation	Dorothy		
1970	Ako'y Tao, May Dugo at Laman!	Lorna		
1970	Lihim ng mga Makasalanan			
1970	Bakit Ako Pa?			
1970	Ganid sa Laman			
1970	Blue Boy			
1970	Laman sa Laman			
1970	Lupang Buhay			
1970	My Beloved			
1970	Pritil			
1971	The Corruptors			
1971	Huwad			
1971	Pagdating sa Dulo	Paloma Miranda		
1971	I'm Eighteen			
1971	Avenida Boy			
1971	Kapag Wagas ang Pagmamahal			
1972	Takbo, Vilma, Dali!			
1973	Zoom, Zoom, Superman!	The Mad Scientist		
1973	Kung Bakit Dugo ang Kulay ng Gabi			
1974	The Magic Carpet			
1974	Daigdig ng Sindak at Lagim	The Lady of Darkness		
1974	Virginia Soliman			
1974	Savage Sisters			
1974	Target: Eva Jones			
1975	Hello, Goodnight, Goodbye		Segment: "Hello"	
1976	Alas 5:00 ng Hapon, Gising Na Ang Mga Anghel			
1976	Scotch on the Rocks to Remember, Black Coffee to Forget			
1979	Salawahan	Marianne David		
1980	Tanikala			
1980	Bubot na Bayabas			
1985	Gamitin Mo Ako	Toyang		
1985	Ina, Kasusuklaman Ba Kita?	Alvina		
1985	Bomba Queen	Mama Carol		
1991	Dead Women in Lingerie	Patricia		

=== Theatre ===
Year	Title	Role	Venue	Notes	Ref(s).
1969	Larawan	Paula	Rajah Sulayman Theater		(Note: Attributed to multiple references:)
1970s	Rigodon de Honor				
1970s	A Streetcar Named Desire				
1981	Boses	Jean Cocteau	Heritage Art Center		(Note: Attributed to multiple references:)

== Accolades ==
Awards and nominations received by Rita Gomez
Organizations	Year (Note: Indicates the year of ceremony. Each year is linked to the article about the awards held that year, wherever possible.)	Work	Category	Result	Ref(s)
FAMAS Awards	1953	Ang Sawa sa Lumang Simboryo	Best Supporting Actress	Nominated	
FAMAS Awards	1957	Via Dolorosa	Best Actress	Nominated	
FAMAS Awards	1958	Rubi-Rosa	Best Actress	Nominated	
FAMAS Awards	1959	Talipandas	Best Actress	Won	
FAMAS Awards	1960	Kidnapped	Best Actress	Nominated	
FAMAS Awards	1961	Tatlong Magdalena	Best Actress	Nominated	
FAMAS Awards	1967	Makasalanan	Best Actress	Nominated	
FAMAS Awards	1971	Bakit Ako Pa?	Best Actress	Won	
FAMAS Awards	1972	Pagdating sa Dulo	Best Actress	Nominated	
FAMAS Awards	1980	Salawahan	Best Supporting Actress	Nominated	
FAMAS Awards	1981	Tanikala	Best Supporting Actress	Nominated	
Gawad Urian	1980	Salawahan	Best Supporting Actress	Nominated	
Luna Awards	1990	Rita Gomez	Lifetime Achievement Award	Won	
Manila Film Festival	1970	Bakit Ako Pa?	Best Actress	Won	

== See also ==
- Cinema of the Philippines
- List of Filipino actresses
- Television in the Philippines
