= Carmencita Abad =

Filipina actress

- Born: 1933 (age 92–93)
- Occupation: Actress
- Relatives: Jay Ilagan (nephew)

Carmencita Abad, known as Carmencita Decano Abad in real life, (born 1933) is a Filipina actress. She made her film debut with Tres Muskiteros (a.k.a. 3 Muskiteers). She was a younger sister of another prewar actress, Corazon Noble.

Inspired of Alexandre Dumas's The Three Musketeers a Filipino version made by Sampaguita Pictures in 1951 was Abad's first major role. The only movie under Sampaguita Pictures that was released in 1951 before she moved to the rival company, Lvn Pictures, in the early 1950s.

Abad's first movie in Lvn Pictures was in cameo roles with Evelyn Villar teamed up with a handsome lead actor of the company Armando Goyena as a Filipino superhero Kapitan Kidlat from the movie Kidlat, Ngayon.

== Filmography ==
- 1951 – Tres Muskiteros a.k.a. Three Muskiteers
- 1953 – Kidlat, Ngayon, a.k.a. Lightning, Today
- 1954 – Prinsipe Teñoso
- 1954 – Damong Ligaw
- 1954 – Ikaw ang Dahilan, a.k.a. You are the Reason
- 1954 – Singsing na Tanso, a.k.a. Silver Ring
- 1955 – Tagapagmana, a.k.a. Inheritance
- 1955 – Hagad, a.k.a. Police
- 1955 – 1 2 3
- 1955 – Panyolitong Bughaw, a.k.a. Blue Handkerchief
- 1955 – Karnabal, a.k.a. Carnival
- 1956 – No Money, No Honey
- 1956 – Everlasting
- 1956 – Medalyong Perlas, a.k.a. Pearl Necklace
- 1956 – Kumander 13, Commander 13
- 1957 – Dalawang Ina, a.k.a. Two Mothers
- 1957 – Rosalina
- 1958 – Zarex
- 1959 – Bayanihan
- 1959 – Biyaya ng Lupa
