= Badjao: The Sea Gypsies =

1957 adventure drama film by Lamberto V. Avellana

- Film poster
- Directed by: Lamberto V. Avellana
- Written by: Rolf Bayer
- Produced by: Narcisa de León
- Starring: Rosa Rosal; Tony Santos, Sr.; Vic Silayan; Leroy Salvador; Pedro Faustino
- Cinematography: Mike Accion
- Edited by: Enrique Jarlego
- Music by: Francisco Buencamino Jr.; Restie Umali
- Production company: LVN Pictures
- Distributed by: LVN Pictures
- Release dates: June 3, 1957 (Philippines); June 5, 1957 (Japan; Asian Film Festival); September 20, 1962 (United States)
- Running time: 1h 40min
- Country: Philippines
- Languages: Filipino; English subtitles

Badjao: The Sea Gypsies is a 1957 Philippine adventure drama film directed by National Artist Lamberto V. Avellana. The film was written by Rolf Bayer and stars Rosa Rosal, Tony Santos, Sr., Leroy Salvador, Vic Silayan, and Pedro Faustino. It tells a love story between Hassan, a Badjao man and Bala Amai, a Tausug woman whose differences were accepted by both sides but the Moro people attempted to destroy their lives.

Avellana won best director for the film at the 1957 Asian Film Festival. The film also won for best screenplay, best cinematography (for Mike Accion), and best editing (for Gregorio Carballo).

The Filipino Academy of Movie Arts and Sciences gave LVN Pictures the 1957 International Prestige Award for the film. The film was screened at the Vancouver Film Festival (Vancouver, Canada) in 1961, the Edinburgh International Film Festival (Edinburgh, United Kingdom) in 1962, and the Coronado Film Festival in 1963.

== Cast ==
- Rosa Rosal as Bala Amai
- Tony Santos Sr. as Hassan
- Vic Silayan as Jikiri
- Leroy Salvador as Asid
- Pedro Faustino as Badjao Chief
- Oscar Keesee as Ismail
- Jose de Cordova as Datu Tahil
- Gerry Gabaldon as Graib

== Restoration ==
The film restoration of Badjao was completed in 2020. The restoration began with the 4K resolution digital scanning of the 35mm print with English subtitles from the collection of the LVN Pictures library stored at the state-of-the-art facilities of the ABS-CBN Film Archives, located at the basement of ELJ Communications Center in Diliman, Quezon City. According to the words from the ABS-CBN Film Restoration group, it was restored in 2K resolution and took 30 hours to eliminate the image impairments (namely scratches, specks, warps, and unstable images) digitally as well as color adjustments in order to make the restored film similar to the achieved brightness and contrast of the original print. According to ABS-CBN Film Restoration head Leonardo P. Katigbak, it was one of their best scans and restorations they ever did, owing to the better quality of the original print used for the restoration.

The 4K restored version was first premiered on September 6, 2020, through ABS-CBN's cable movie channel, Cinema One. For online users, it premiered on January 8, 2021, through live streaming on ABS-CBN Film Restoration's Facebook page. Unlike the previous live streams of some restored LVN films, it was made available to audiences outside the Philippines.
