= Blessings of the Land =

1959 film by Manuel Silos

Biyaya ng Lupa
- Film poster
- Directed by: Manuel Silos
- Screenplay by: Pablo Naval
- Story by: Celso Al Carunungan; Pablo Naval
- Produced by: Narcisa de León
- Starring: Rosa Rosal; Tony Santos Sr.; Leroy Salvador; Carlos Padilla Jr.; Marita Zobel; Danilo Jurado; Jose de Cordova
- Cinematography: Remigio Young
- Edited by: Ike Jarlego Sr.
- Music by: Juan Silos Jr.
- Production company: LVN Pictures
- Distributed by: ABS-CBN Film Productions (restored version)
- Release date: December 16, 1959
- Running time: 111 minutes
- Country: Philippines
- Language: Filipino

Blessings of the Land (Filipino: Biyaya ng Lupa) is a 1959 Filipino drama film directed by Manuel Silos and written by Pablo Naval from a story he co-wrote with Celso Al Carunungan. The story follows the life of a couple residing in a village, but their deaf-mute son, Miguel, is tested and "must rise above his disability after the tragedies they experienced. The film stars Rosa Rosal and Tony Santos Sr. as the married couple, with their children played by Carlos Padilla Jr., Leroy Salvador, Marita Zobel, and Danilo Jurado.

Produced by LVN Pictures, the film was theatrically released on December 16, 1959. The film won the FAMAS Best Picture Award. It was also nominated for Best Director, Best Actor, and Best Supporting Actress. In 1960, the film was entered into the 10th Berlin International Film Festival, which was held in West Berlin, and the Asian Film Festival, which was held in Tokyo, Japan.

== Plot ==
Maria and Jose, a hardworking farming couple, begin their married life by cultivating a lanzones orchard in the countryside. Through years of perseverance, they build a prosperous farm and raise their four children: Miguel, their eldest son, who is deaf and mute; Arturo, an ambitious young man; Angelita, their only daughter; and Lito, the youngest. Their family becomes respected in the village, symbolizing the rewards of honest labor and close community ties.

Peace in the village is disrupted by the presence of Bruno, a feared widower rumored to have murdered his own wife. Bruno becomes obsessed with Choleng, Jose's niece, and repeatedly pressures her into accepting his courtship. While attempting to escape him near a cliff, Choleng accidentally falls to her death. The villagers hold Bruno responsible, forcing him to flee into the mountains to avoid their anger.

Filled with resentment, Bruno later returns seeking revenge against Jose and his family. During one of his attacks, he sexually assaults Angelita, leaving the family devastated. Jose organizes the villagers to capture Bruno, but the confrontation ends tragically when Bruno shoots Jose, mortally wounding him. Maria is left widowed and must take responsibility for both her grieving family and the farm.

As the family struggles to recover, Arturo leaves for Manila in search of a better future. There, he becomes attracted to city life and eventually returns, accompanied by a woman from Manila. Hoping to finance new opportunities, Arturo persuades Maria to mortgage the family's rice fields before returning to the city, a decision that places the family's livelihood at greater risk.

Meanwhile, Miguel quietly remains in the village, helping his mother maintain the farm despite his disability. He develops a gentle romance with Gloria, a young woman from the community who accepts him without prejudice. Through his dedication and resilience, Miguel demonstrates that his inability to hear or speak does not diminish his courage or his devotion to his family.

The family's fortunes are threatened once more when a wealthy landowner from a neighboring town hires Bruno to destroy the family's flourishing lanzones orchard. Bruno gathers a band of men to carry out the attack, hoping to ruin the harvest that represents Maria and Jose's life's work. However, the villagers rally behind Maria and her family, defending the orchard against the assault. During the climactic struggle, Miguel confronts Bruno and ultimately kills him, ending the long cycle of violence and revenge that has haunted the family.

With Bruno dead, peace finally returns to the village. Arturo comes back from Manila and reconciles with his mother and siblings. The family is reunited as the long-awaited lanzones harvest finally bears fruit, fulfilling the promise of the land that Jose and Maria cultivated together. The film concludes by affirming that perseverance, family unity, and the support of one's community ultimately triumph over greed, violence, and hardship.

== Cast ==
- Rosa Rosal as Maria: The devoted matriarch who keeps the family together after Jose's death.
- Leroy Salvador as Miguel: The family's deaf-mute eldest son
- Tony Santos Sr. as Jose: The patriarch and a hardworking farmer whose orchard becomes the family's legacy.
- Carmencita Abad as Gloria: Miguel's love interest
- Carlos Padilla, Jr. as Arturo: The second son, whose ambitions lead him to Manila before he eventually returns home.
- Marita Zobel as Angelita: The family's only daughter, whose tragic assault deepens the family's suffering.
- Joseph de Cordova as Bruno: The principal antagonist, a violent widower whose actions bring tragedy upon the family.
- Danilo Jurado as Lito: The family's youngest son.
- Carmen Del Ocampo
- Miguel Lopez
- Mario Roldan
- Tony Dantes
- Jerry Reyes
- Mila Ocampo as Choleng: Jose's niece, whose death marks the beginning of Bruno's downfall
- Pedro Faustino

== Production ==
The film was shot in the province of Laguna. Though the shooting schedule was "rigorous", the film crew managed to set up a fiesta in the province for Narcisa de León, cofounder of LVN Pictures, in celebration of her birthday on October 29, 1959.

== Release ==
Blessings of the Land was released in Philippine theaters on December 16, 1959.

=== Digital restoration ===
The film was digitally scanned and restored by the ABS-CBN Film Restoration Project in 2019. The restoration began with the digital scanning of frames in 4K resolution using the 35mm print as its source material. The 35mm print was stored at the ABS-CBN Film Archives and compiled under the collection of the majority of LVN Pictures' library. The film was restored in 2K resolution and took 70 hours to eliminate image impairments (including scratches and unstable images) successfully. The restoration team also adjusted the film's color and brightness in order to make it closely identical to the original form.

The digitally scanned and restored 4K high definition version was first premiered on television on May 26, 2019, 9:00PM through ABS-CBN's movie channel for cable television, Cinema One. It was also premiered theatrically on October 17, 2019, as part of Centennial Classics exhibition for the QCinema International Film Festival with the attendance of the two original lead stars Rosa Rosal and Marita Zobel, as well as the representatives of the film's staff and cast members who had previously died or were unable to attend, including actress-singer Zsa Zsa Padilla and her daughter Zia Quizon (representing their father and grandfather, respectively), Rap Fernandez (representing his uncle), the family of Tony Santos Sr., and Toni Rose Gayda (Rosa Rosal's daughter).

On October 1, 2020, the restored version of the film was live streamed on the social networking site Facebook by ABS-CBN Film Restoration (also known as Sagip Pelikula).

== Accolades ==
Year	Group	Category	Recipient	Result
1960	Asian Film Festival	Best Supporting Actor	Leroy Salvador	Won
1960	Berlin International Film Festival	Golden Bear for Best Film		Nominated
1960	FAMAS Awards	Best Picture		Won
1960	FAMAS Awards	Best Original Story	Celso Al. Carunungan	Won
1960	FAMAS Awards	Best Actor	Leroy Salvador	Nominated
1960	FAMAS Awards	Best Actor	Tony Santos	Nominated
1960	FAMAS Awards	Best Actress	Rosa Rosal	Nominated
1960	FAMAS Awards	Best Supporting Actress	Marita Zobel	Nominated
1960	FAMAS Awards	Best Director	Manuel Silos	Nominated
1960	FAMAS Awards	Best Screenplay	Celso Al. Carunungan; Pablo Naval	Nominated
1960	FAMAS Awards	Best Editing	Enrique Jarlego	Nominated
1960	FAMAS Awards	Best Musical Score	Juan Silos Jr.	Nominated
1960	FAMAS Awards	Best Sound Engineering	Manuel Silos	Nominated
