= Sakada (film) =

- Directed by: Behn Cervantes
- Screenplay by: Lualhati Bautista
- Story by: Oscar Miranda
- Starring: Alicia Alonzo; Robert Arevalo; Hilda Koronel; Bembol Roco; Gloria Romero; Pancho Magalona; Rosa Rosal; Tony Santos Sr.; Joseph Sytangco; Menggie Cobarrubias
- Cinematography: Edmund Cupcupin
- Edited by: Edgardo Vinarao
- Music by: Lucio San Pedro
- Production company: Sagisag Films
- Distributed by: Sagisag Films
- Release date: February 20, 1976
- Running time: 119 minutes
- Country: Philippines
- Languages: Filipino; English; Spanish

Sakada (The Tenants, also Seasonal Sugarcane Workers) is a 1976 Philippine social-realist film about the ordeals of sugarcane farmers on the island of Negros in the Philippines. It is "a thinly-veiled criticism of the country's feudal power structure." The film was directed by Behn Cervantes and written by Oscar Miranda (story) and Lualhati Bautista (screenplay). Music was done by Lucio San Pedro. It starred Alicia Alonzo, Robert Arevalo, Hilda Koronel, Pancho Magalona, Bembol Roco, Gloria Romero, Rosa Rosal, and Tony Santos Sr.

The movie spent three weeks in theaters before Philippine dictator Ferdinand Marcos ordered the military to seize copies of the film. The director was also arrested under the order of Marcos. Sakada was first screened on Philippine television in 2005.

Musical scorer Lutgardo Labad described the film as "a major cinematic coup that unearthed the inhuman conditions of our people then."

== Cast ==
Cast

- Alicia Alonzo as Aurora del Mundo
- Robert Arevalo as Salvador "Badong" del Mundo
- Hilda Koronel as Ester del Mundo
- Pancho Magalona as Don Manuel Montemayor
- Bembol Roco as David del Mundo
- Gloria Romero as Doña Consuelo Montemayor
- Rosa Rosal as Dolores del Mundo
- Tony Santos Sr. as Arsenio "Arsing" del Mundo
- Joseph Sytangco as Juan Miguel Montemayor
- Menggie Cobarrubias as Andres
- Cris Michelena as Alex Montemayor
- Nena Perez Rubio as Nelia
- Mervyn Samson as Contreras
- Cris Vertido as Father Vic

== Plot ==
The movie follows the life of Negrense sakadas (Spanish: sacadas), or seasonal sugarcane farmers, and the asenderos (Spanish: hacenderos) who own the plantations. Unrest ensues after a sakada is shot to death by one of the plantation's security guards. As the story unfolds, the movie reveals the exploitative feudal agricultural system of the time.

== Production ==
Sakada was the first film by director Behn Cervantes and scriptwriter Lualhati Bautista. It was filmed under time pressure and budget constraints. As a first-time film director, Cervantes said that he had to deal with technical problems. Time and budget constraints prevented the production from doing reshoots.

Sakada was produced and screened in 1976 while the Philippines was under martial law under Ferdinand Marcos. After Sakada's third week of screening in Philippine cinemas, copies of the film were seized and the director was arrested and detained under the order of Marcos.

After Cervantes' detention, he wrote in a letter to his family dated January 19, 1978, "My movie, Sakada, and my plays, especially the last one, Pagsambang Bayan, show the exploitative nature of this system, the evils the ruling class commit on the many, the need to change the order of things."

Sakada was first shown on television on June 25, 2005, on ABCinema, three decades after prints were seized by the military from movie theaters. ABCinema aimed to feature "only the best local and foreign films that will make the Filipino audience more aware of their culture." In an interview, Cervantes was asked about how young audiences in 2005 could relate to Sakada. He said society's problems "remain the same and most of the time we change leaders but they're the same dogs with different collars."

== Reception ==
Musical scorer Lutgardo Labad described Sakada as "a major cinematic coup that unearthed the inhuman conditions of our people then."

Film critic Mel Tobias wrote that "any book on Filipino films would be incomplete without mentioning Sakada." He wrote that the film "was a cry to the people and the government to awaken to the serious labor problems in the Philippines. In the process, it stimulated the often infantile movie producers to acknowledge this unorthodox film, made contrary to the traditional formula of Philippine moviemaking." He also praised the performance of the star-studded cast, particularly of Rosa Rosal, "a versatile actress, [who] made a sensational comeback in her portrayal of a sentimental widow. She is driven to become a leader of the sakadas in their fight for reform."

"The film, with its searing focus on the desperate plight of seasonal sugarcane workers, was an eye-opener for most viewers lulled by the martial law era's siren call of 'the true, the good and the beautiful,'" wrote an Inquirer editorial.

Sakada was made at a time of strict censorship, according to Philippine national artist for literature Bienvenido Lumbera, yet "the ingenuity of scriptwriters and directors was able to offer movie-goers works that went beyond entertainment and tackled subject matter with social implications." In the essay "Terror and Culture under Marcos' New Society," Lumbera wrote that Sakada "exposed the abuses and injustices committed by landlords in cahoots with the military in the suppression of the peasant struggle for higher wages and better treatment."

Sakada, in 1981, won a Dekada Award for Best Film of the Decade.

== See also ==
- Gawad Urian Award
- 5th Gawad Urian Awards
- List of films about martial law in the Philippines
