= Behn Cervantes =

Filipino artist and activist (1938–2013)

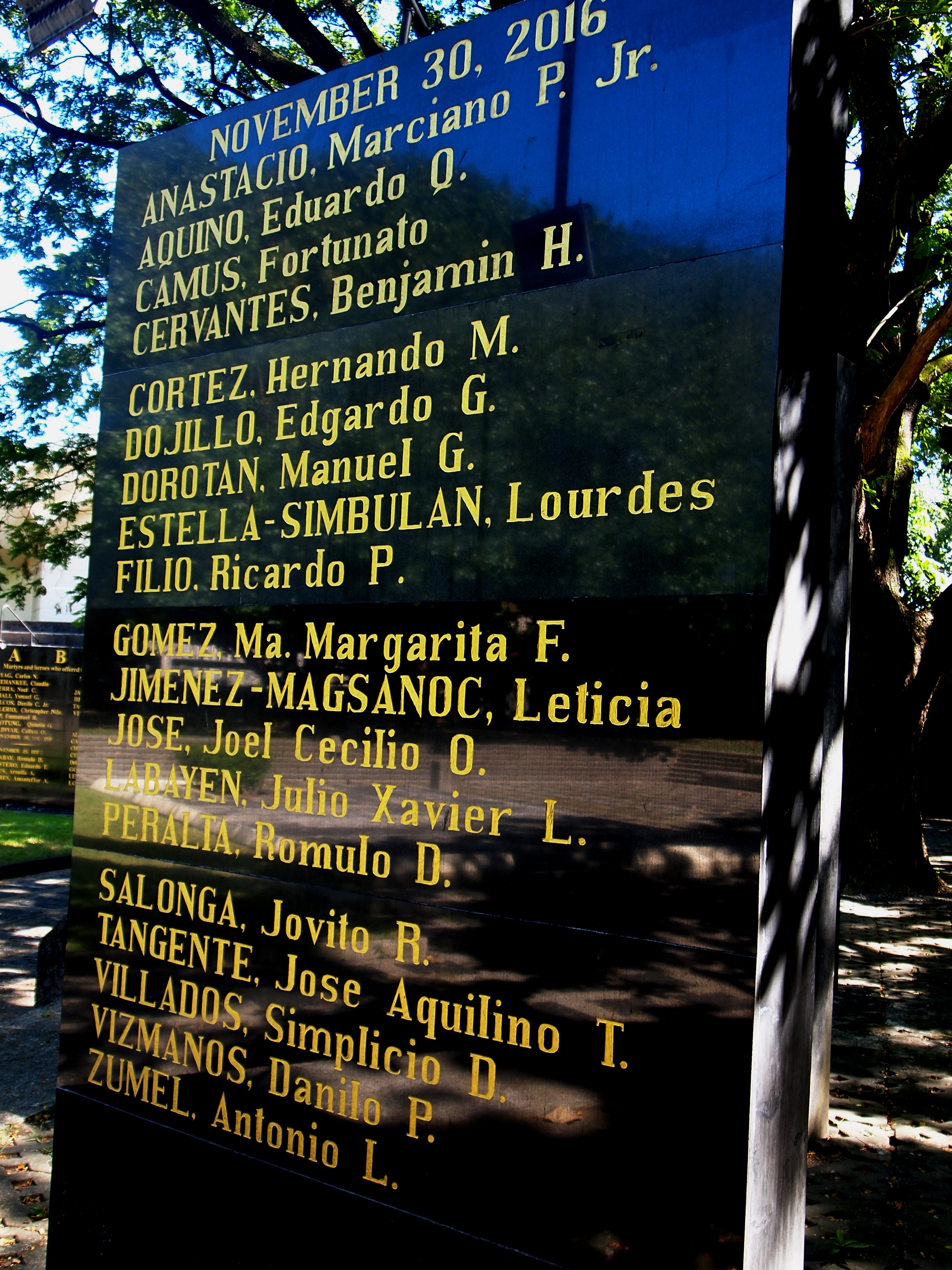
- Detail of the Wall of Remembrance at the Bantayog ng mga Bayani, showing names from the 2016 batch of Bantayog Honorees, including that of Behn Cervantes.
- Born: Benjamín Roberto Holcombe Cervantes; August 26, 1938; Cabanatuan, Nueva Ecija, Commonwealth of the Philippines
- Died: August 13, 2013 (aged 74); Muntinlupa, Philippines
- Education: University of the Philippines Diliman (BA)
- Known for: Activism against the administration of then-President Ferdinand Marcos through theater and film
- Notable work: Sakada

Benjamín Roberto "Behn" Holcombe Cervantes (August 25, 1938 – August 13, 2013) was a Filipino artist and activist. He was highly regarded as a theater pioneer, teacher, and progressive thinker who was detained multiple times during martial law in the Philippines.

He directed the film Sakada (1976), about the struggle of Negrense peasants at a sugarcane plantation. Copies of the film were seized by the military under the Marcos dictatorship. Musical scorer Lutgardo Labad described the film as "a major cinematic coup that unearthed the inhuman conditions of our people then." In 1981, the film won a Dekada Award for Best Film of the Decade.

At the University of the Philippines (UP), he founded the theater group UP Repertory Company in 1974 "to combat the censorship that was in place during martial law." He was also a member of the Upsilon Sigma Phi fraternity. He was also founding member of the Philippine Educational Theater Association (PETA) and the Manunuri ng Pelikulang Filipino.

Cervantes' name is on the Bantayog ng mga Bayani Wall of Remembrance, which recognizes heroes who fought against martial law in the Philippines under Ferdinand Marcos.

== Work on stage and in film ==
=== In theater ===
Among Cervantes' work as stage director are Guys and Dolls, The Short, Short Life of Citizen Juan, and Iskolar ng Bayan.

Cervantes appeared in many stage productions as actor, including The Mikado, Waiting for Godot, Rosencrantz and Guildenstern Are Dead, Cabaret, and M. Butterfly.

He also worked on activist plays, including Pagsambang Bayan and Estados Unidos versus Juan Matapang Cruz. He also directed Sigaw ng Bayan, which was about the Philippine Revolution.

=== In film ===
Cervantes directed Sakada in 1976 while the Philippines was under martial law. The film about sugarcane plantation workers "was a thinly-veiled criticism of the country's feudal power structure." It starred Rosa Rosal, Robert Arevalo, Hilda Koronel, Alicia Alonzo, Pancho Magalona, Bembol Roco, Gloria Romero, and Tony Santos Sr. After the movie had spent three weeks in theaters, Marcos ordered the military to seize copies of the film. The film led to Cervantes' arrest. Sakada received its first screening on Philippine television in 2005.

He also directed Bawal, Ito Kaya'y Pagkakasala, and Masikip, Masakit, Mahapdi.

He appeared in the films Bomba Star, Aguila, When I Fall In Love, Memories of Old Manila, Waiting in the Wings, Alas-Dose, Ang Anak ni Brocka, and Barako.

== Activism ==
Together with fellow filmmaker Lino Brocka and other artists, Cervantes initiated the Free the Artist, Free the Media Movement to oppose media censorship during the dictatorship of Ferdinand Marcos. The movement led to the formation of the Concerned Artists of the Philippines in 1983.

Cervantes took part in the 1984 Welcome Rotonda protest, during which pro-Marcos forces hosed down and fired tear gas at several thousand peaceful protesters gathered at Welcome Rotonda.

In 1985, Cervantes and Brocka attended a nationwide transport strike in sympathy with public transportation drivers who organized the strike against rising gas prices. Cervantes and Brocka were arrested and charged with illegal assembly, which carries a penalty of life imprisonment. They were released after 16 days.

He was a member of the Concerned Artists of the Philippines.

He is believed to have coined the term edifice complex in the 1970s to describe Philippine First Lady Imelda Marcos's practice of using publicly funded construction projects as political and election propaganda.

== Awards ==
- Life Achievement Award from University of the Philippines Alumni Association
- Aliw award for Life Achievement in Theater
- Cultural Center of the Philippines' centennial award

== See also ==
- Bantayog ng mga Bayani
