= Nestor de Villa =

Filipino entertainer (1928–2004)

- Born: Gines Francisco Soriano; July 6, 1928; Cabanatuan, Nueva Ecija, Philippine Islands
- Died: February 21, 2004 (aged 75); Muntinlupa, Philippines
- Resting place: Manila Memorial Park – Sucat, Paranaque, Philippines
- Other name: Gines
- Occupations: Actor; Dancer
- Years active: 1951–2004
- Political party: Nacionalista (c. 1967)
- Spouse: Marilu Cacho
- Children: 4
- Relatives: Paul Soriano (grandson); Toni Gonzaga (granddaughter-in-law)

Gines Francisco Soriano (July 6, 1928 – February 21, 2004), known professionally as Nestor de Villa, was a Filipino actor frequently cast in musical films. He was a gifted dancer, often paired with frequent on-screen partner Nida Blanca in both film and television. His dancing talent led some people to call him the "Gene Kelly of the Philippines".

== Biography ==
De Villa was born Gines Francisco Soriano on July 6, 1928, in then municipality of Cabanatuan in the province of Nueva Ecija. He was a pre-medical student when he was signed by LVN Pictures. His father was disappointed by his decision to become an actor, and the two became estranged. However, they were reconciled by LVN President Doña Sisang de Leon, who arranged to have de Villa's father secretly attend one of his movie premieres.

He made his first film with LVN, Amor-Mio (My Love), in 1951. The following year, he teamed up with another LVN contract star, Nida Blanca, for Romansa sa Nayon. The film's success popularized the Nestor-Nida "love team", though in real-life, de Villa would marry Marilu Cacho Soriano from the wealthy and socially prominent Cacho family.

He remained at LVN until 1961, when the studio discontinued making films. He then transferred to Sampaguita Pictures where in 1962 he made his Sampaguita debut in Tugtuging Bukid (Farm Music), together with Gloria Romero. In the 1960s, he was nominated three times for the FAMAS Best Actor award—for Mga Yapak ng Walang Bakas (1962); Naku Yabang (1964); and Siete Dolores (1968). De Villa and Blanca also appeared together on an ABS-CBN television show, The Nida-Nestor Show.

In 1967, de Villa attempted to run for vice mayor of Makati as the running mate of former ambassador Amelito Mutuc, but lost to incumbent vice mayor Teotimo Gealogo.

In the 1980s, de Villa made his screen comeback when he was again paired with Blanca in two films for Viva Films: Forgive and Forget, which also starred Sharon Cuneta and William Martinez and Saan Darating ang Umaga? (Where Will the Morning Come?), a family drama co-starring Maricel Soriano, Nida Blanca and Jaypee de Guzman.

He was posthumously inducted to the Philippines Eastwood City Walk of Fame in December 2005.

== Personal life ==
He was married to Marilu Cacho, has three sons and daughters-in-law, Jeric and Marissa, Gicky and Malu, Joby and Cindy. His only daughter Karel is married to Toti Belda. His grandson Paul Soriano is a son of Jeric, and is also a TV and commercial director.

== Death ==
De Villa remained active in films until his death of complications arising from hepatobiliary cancer on February 21, 2004.

== Filmography ==
=== Film ===
| Year | Title |
|---|---|
| 1951 | Amor Mio |
| 1952 | Tenyente Carlos Blanco |
| 1952 | Dimas |
| 1952 | Dalawang Sundalong Kanin |
| 1952 | Haring Solomon at Reyna Sheba |
| 1952 | Romansa sa Nayon |
| 1952 | Rodrigo de Villa |
| 1952 | Tenyente Carlos Blanco |
| 1953 | Tumbalik na Daigdig |
| 1953 | Hijo de Familia |
| 1953 | Squatters |
| 1953 | Dalawang Pag-Ibig |
| 1953 | Hiyasmin |
| 1954 | Waray-Waray |
| 1954 | Tin-edyer |
| 1954 | Luneta |
| 1954 | Singsing Na Tanso |
| 1955 | Darling Ko |
| 1955 | 1 2 3 |
| 1955 | Ang Ibong Adarna |
| 1955 | Dalagang Taring |
| 1955 | Talusaling |
| 1955 | Ikaw Kasi |
| 1956 | Handang Matodas |
| 1956 | Easy Ka Lang Padre! |
| 1956 | Medalyong Perlas |
| 1956 | Big Shot |
| 1956 | Ganyan Ka Pala |
| 1956 | Bahala Na! |
| 1956 | Aling Kutsero |
| 1957 | Sebya, Mahal Kita |
| 1957 | Kalyehera |
| 1957 | Krisalis |
| 1957 | Turista |
| 1957 | Tignan Natin |
| 1958 | Villa Milagrosa |
| 1958 | Austerity Love |
| 1958 | Casa Grande |
| 1958 | Wala Kang Paki |
| 1958 | Mga Anak ni Waray |
| 1958 | Bayanihan |
| 1959 | Ang Langit Ko'y Ikaw |
| 1959 | Baguio Fever |
| 1959 | Chinita |
| 1959 | Surrender - Hell! |
| 1959 | Limang Punglo |
| 1959 | Tayo'y Magsaya |
| 1960 | Unos sa Laot |
| 1960 | Dahlia |
| 1960 | Kung Ako'y Mahal Ko |
| 1960 | Pitong Gabi sa Paris |
| 1960 | Sandakot na Alabok |
| 1960 | Lawiswis Kawayan |
| 1960 | My Serenade |
| 1960 | Anino ng Kahapon |
| 1960 | Bakit Ka Nagtampo |
| 1960 | Wala Kang Kapantay |
| 1961 | Nagbabagang Lupa |
| 1961 | Walang Sisihan |
| 1961 | Mga Yapak na Walang Bakas |
| 1962 | Tugtuging Bukid |
| 1962 | Sikat Na, Siga Pa! |
| 1962 | Oy... Akin Yata Yan! |
| 1962 | Jam Session |
| 1962 | Magtiis Ka Darling |
| 1963 | Adonis Abril |
| 1963 | Limbo Rock |
| 1963 | Asyang Ng La Loma |
| 1963 | Ang Bukas ay Akin |
| 1963 | Naku, Yabang! |
| 1964 | Ginintuang Ani |
| 1964 | Yeba Chiquicha |
| 1964 | Si Doray Naman... |
| 1965 | Utos ni Tale Hindi Mababale |
| 1965 | Everybody Dance |
| 1966 | Sound of Bwisit |
| 1966 | Mabilis Paa't Kamay |
| 1966 | Huwag Kang Sumingit |
| 1966 | Familia Galawgaw |
| 1966 | Espiya Contra Espiya |
| 1967 | Wow Na Wow! |
| 1968 | Siete Dolores |
| 1975 | Siya'y Umalis, Siya'y Dumating |
| 1982 | Mother Dear |
| 1982 | Forgive and Forget |
| 1982 | Cross My Heart |
| 1983 | Saan Darating Ang Umaga? |
| 1984 | Anak ni Waray, Anak ni Biday |
| 1985 | Hindi Nahahati ang Langit |
| 1985 | Like Father, Like Son |
| 1986 | Paglingon sa Kinabukasan |
| 1987 | Prinsipeng Gusgusin |
| 1993 | Ligaw-Ligawan, Kasal-Kasalan, Bahay-Bahayan |
| 2002 | Forevermore (Last film appearance) |

=== Television ===
| Year | Title | Role |
|---|---|---|
| 1960–1964 | The Nida-Nestor Show | |
| 1994 | Maalaala Mo Kaya: Dancing Shoes | |
| 2001–2002 | Biglang Sibol, Bayang Impasibol | Noel |
| 2002–2003 | Sa Dulo ng Walang Hanggan | Gov. Federico Bustamante |
