= Child of Sorrow (film) =

1956 film by Lamberto V. Avellana

- Film poster
- Directed by: Lamberto V. Avellana
- Written by: Rolf Bayer
- Story consultants: Estrella Alfon; T. D. Agcaoili
- Produced by: Narcisa de Leon
- Starring: Rosa Rosal; Tony Santos Sr.; Vic Silayan; Joseph de Cordova; Leroy Salvador; Vic Bacani
- Cinematography: Mike Accion
- Edited by: Enrique Jarlego
- Music by: Francisco Buencamino Jr.
- Distributed by: LVN Pictures
- Release date: March 20, 1956
- Running time: 119 minutes
- Country: Philippines
- Languages: Filipino; English

Child of Sorrow (Tagalog: Anak Dalita; subtitled The Ruins) is a 1956 Philippine crime drama-tragedy film directed by Lamberto V. Avellana from a story and screenplay written by Rolf Bayer, with Estrella Alfon and T. D. Agcaoili as story consultants. Set in the slums of Manila, recovering from the aftermath of the Second World War, the story follows Cita, a prostitute with good intentions and Vic, a war hero who served in the Korean War under PEFTOK, living together in the ravaged capital but when they were involved with Cardo's nasty plans, they, along with Father Fidel, join forces to stop him to succeed.

Produced and distributed by LVN Pictures, the film was theatrically released on March 20, 1956, but it did not do well at the box office. Despite the failure, it became one of Avellana's cinematic masterpieces and one of the greatest Filipino films ever made due to its acclaim at the awards, positive reviews, and given importance by film critics and scholars in modern times. The film was selected as the Philippine entry for the Best Foreign Language Film at the 29th Academy Awards, but was not accepted as a nominee. The film won the Golden Harvest for Best Film Award at the Asia-Pacific Film Festival in British Hong Kong.

== Plot ==
In post-war Manila, as Cita walks home to her community located at the ruined church, she goes to the house of Aling Tinay, who was sick and bedridden, telling her that her son Vic is coming back from his service in South Korea. As the whole PEFTOK contingent returned home, Vic was informed by Cita's younger brother, Ipe, that his mother was dying. The news of her condition led Vic to return to his home immediately, and he entered the house. Aling Tinay finally saw her son but she died later in his arms.

== Cast ==
- Rosa Rosal as Cita
- Tony Santos, Sr. as Vic
- Joseph de Cordova as Kardo
- Vic Silayan as Father Fidel
- Vic Bacani as Ipe
- Leroy Salvador as Soldier
- Rosa Aguirre as Tinay
- Oscar Keesee as Club Manager (as Oscar Keese)
- Alfonso Carvajal as Customs Officer
- Johnny Reyes as Army Doctor
- Eddie Rodriguez as Eddie
- Arturo Moran as Gerry

== Production ==
Unlike most LVN productions of the time, Anak Dalita didn't contain a single singing or dancing performance because of its theme—poverty, and crime in post-war Manila—and because the lead stars of the film were minor box-office actors. The project was almost rejected by LVN Pictures founder and executive producer Narcisa de Leon, widely known as Doña Sisang, due to the said circumstances. Fortunately, her son, producer Manuel de Leon, believed strongly in the screenplay and convinced his mother to approve the project.

=== Locations ===
The film was shot in Intramuros. According to the recollections of the director's daughter, Ivi Avellana Cosio, her father used the existing locations as the setting of the film. For the part of the wooden houses, he and his team asked permission from the residents and house owners to use their residences as the setting for the characters, with the residents moving into nearby houses for the duration of the filming.

== Restoration ==
The film was digitally scanned and restored by the ABS-CBN Film Restoration Project. The 2K digital scanned and restored version was first premiered online on October 31, 2020, as a special screening for the Pista ng Pelikulang Pilipino exhibition.

On March 31, 2021, on the eve of Holy Week, the 2K version of the film was live-streamed on ABS-CBN Film Restoration's Facebook page.

== Accolades ==
Year	Award-giving body	Category	Nominee	Result
1956	Asia Pacific Film Festival	Best Film	Lamberto V. Avellana	Won
1958	FAMAS Awards	International Prestige Award of Merit	LVN Pictures	Won
