= Nida Blanca =

Filipino actress (1936–2001)

- Blanca in 1954
- Born: Dorothy Guinto Jones; January 6, 1936; Gapan, Nueva Ecija, Commonwealth of the Philippines
- Died: November 7, 2001 (aged 65); San Juan, Metro Manila, Philippines
- Cause of death: Murder (stab wounds)
- Resting place: Loyola Memorial Park, Marikina, Philippines
- Education: Adamson University High School
- Occupation: Actress
- Years active: 1951–2001
- Spouses: Victorino Torres (m. 1957; div. 1981); Rod Lauren (m. 1979)
- Children: 1

Nida Blanca (born Dorothy Guinto Jones; January 6, 1936 – November 7, 2001) was a Filipino actress whose career spanned five decades. She was one of the biggest box-office draws of the 1950s and rose to stardom with roles in romantic comedies and musical films with frequent on-screen partner Nestor de Villa. She achieved Grand slam in 1987 for her performance in the drama Magdusa Ka!, winning Best Supporting Actress in all four major award-giving bodies in the Philippines. Blanca was a board member of Movie and Television Review and Classification Board in 1998 until her death in 2001.

== Biography ==
Nida Blanca was born as Dorothy Guinto Jones on January 6, 1936, in then municipality of Gapan, Nueva Ecija, Commonwealth of the Philippines (then a United States territory) to an American soldier father of mestizo descent named John William Jones, Jr. (1916–1942) and a local Filipina mother with Tagalog roots named Inocencia Vélez Guinto (1913–2006), she appeared in her first film at age 15. Actress Delia Razon successfully urged the head of LVN Pictures, Doña Sisang de Leon to hire Blanca. She was screen tested on October 6, 1951, by LVN Pictures where she reigned as "queen" of movies for more than a decade, doing mostly comedies opposite the late Nestor de Villa. In the movies, she has played a wide range of roles from a butch lesbian to a nun. She also starred in the hit TV comedy series, John en Marsha, where she played the wife who sticks by her poor husband despite her rich mother's constant harping. In 1958, she appeared opposite her contemporary, noted singer/actress Sylvia La Torre, and Leroy Salvador, in the LVN movie Tuloy ang Ligaya.

Blanca was married twice. As divorce is not legal in the Philippines, she separated from her first husband, Victorino Torres, when their daughter Kaye was two years old. She later married her second husband Roger Lawrence Strunk (1939–2007) an American singer and actor, known by his screen name Rod Lauren in Las Vegas in 1979. The couple relocated to Manila.

== Other activities ==
In 1952, Blanca competed at the Miss Philippines Universe pageant where she finished as a top 12 semi-finalist.

== Murder and aftermath ==
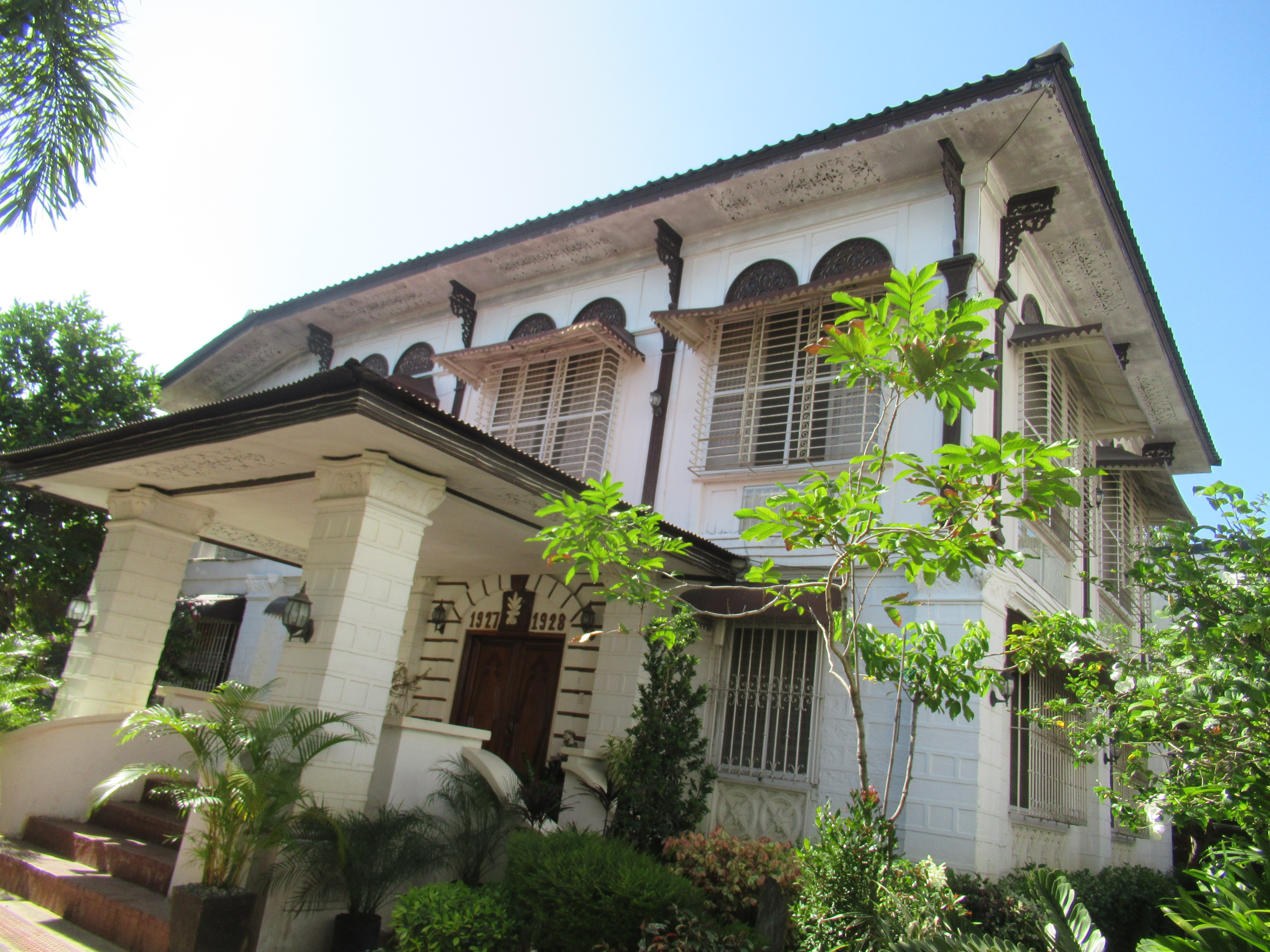
Blanca's old house in Lumang Gapan

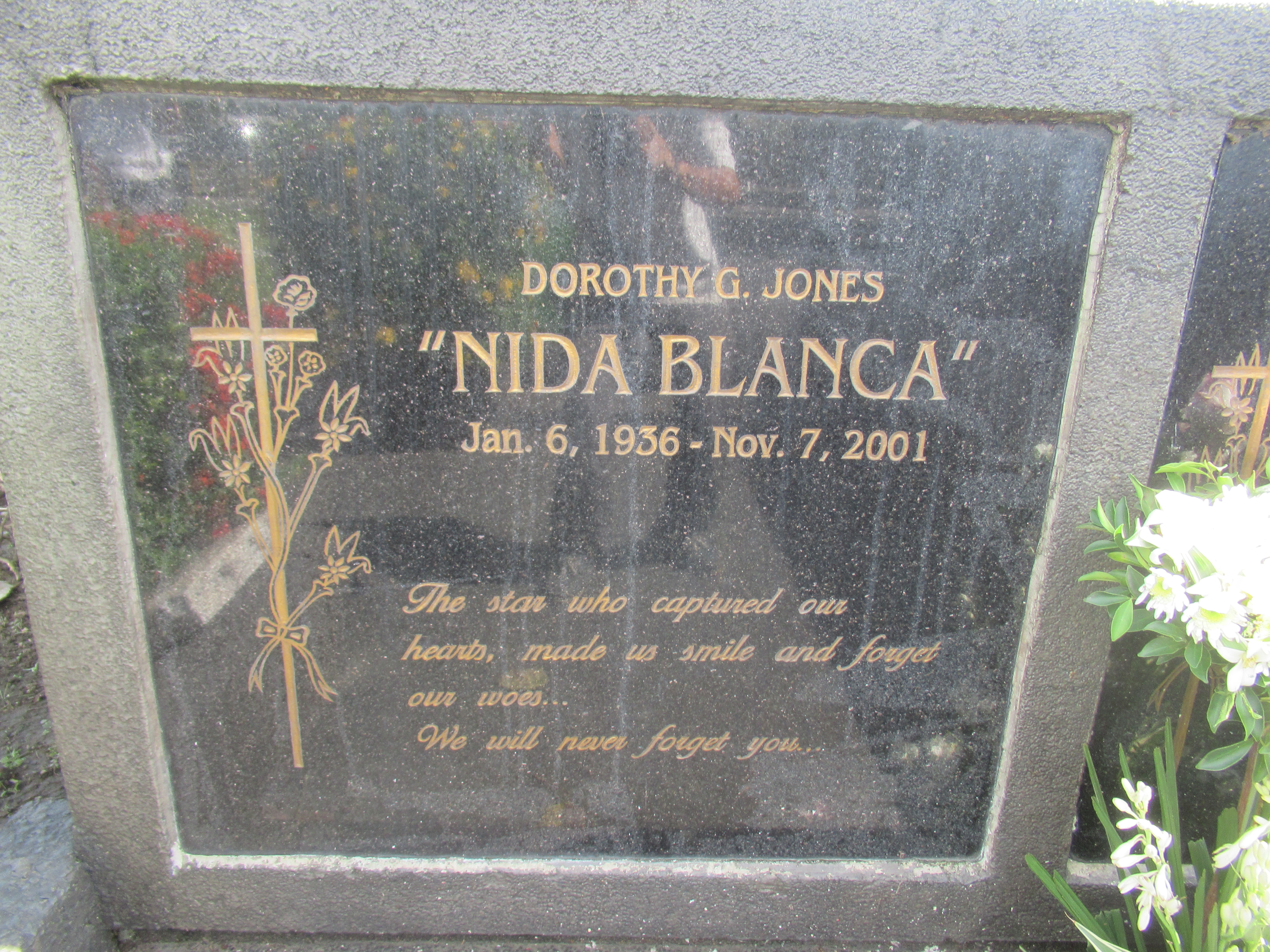
Nida Blanca's tomb in Loyola Memorial Park, Marikina

On November 7, 2001, Blanca was found murdered; beaten and stabbed 13 times in the back seat of her car in the parking lot of Atlanta Centre in Greenhills, San Juan, Metro Manila where she worked for the Movie and Television Review and Classification Board, attending screenings and rating movies twice a week, at the time of her death.

The prime suspect was Blanca's husband Rod Strunk, whom prosecutors said had hired a hitman to kill her because Blanca had disinherited him from her will. Investigators found that Blanca had up to ₱85 million in properties, including a Greenhills, San Juan condominium worth ₱10 million and a house in California worth US$300,000. If Blanca had annulled her marriage, Strunk would get nothing, but if she died before terminating the marriage, Strunk as the legal spouse would have been entitled to a portion of his estranged wife's inheritance despite her bequeathing everything to her daughter.

The case rested on the statements of witnesses and Philip Medel, a self-confessed killer who surrendered to PNP Task Force Marsha on November 19, 2001, and confessed that Strunk had hired him to kill Blanca. Medel recanted his testimony four days later, claiming the police had tortured him into confessing. Prosecutors said medical examinations had found no evidence to back his claim of torture.

Despite Medel's recantation, Strunk remained the prime suspect according to Philippine prosecutors, based largely on circumstantial evidence and statements of new witnesses. Strunk was in the United States in 2003 when he was charged with the murder of Blanca, having left the Philippines in January 2002 to visit his dying mother. He never returned, and was later arrested at his home then detained at the Sacramento County Jail after the Philippine government filed an extradition request against him. The United States court denied the extradition request and Strunk immediately was released from jail. The Philippine government had filed a second extradition case against Strunk but did not receive any official response from the United States government.

Strunk committed suicide on July 11, 2007 by jumping from a second-floor balcony of the Tracy Inn in Tracy, California, where he had been staying for the previous three days.

Kaye Torres lamented in 2008 that after seven years, the criminal case is still pending trial. She added she is convinced of Philip Medel’s guilt.

Philip Medel remained the suspect and was held in jail until his death on April 7, 2010 at the age of 62. Medel died of sepsis caused by pneumonia at the Philippine General Hospital.

The pending murder case on Nida Blanca was featured in the Philippine television documentary series Case Unclosed as its sixth episode titled "Nida Blanca Murder Case". In 2025, the case was reexamined on ABS-CBN News's online exclusive documentary "Philippines Most Shocking Stories". The following year, on the 25th anniversary of her murder, it was also featured on the GMA News online documentary "Philippine Controversies Revisited".

== Legacy ==
On February 17, 2002, the National Commission for Culture and the Arts (NCCA) and the Mowelfund Film Institute organized a screening event of Blanca's films Waray-Waray (1954), John en Marsha (1973), and Magdusa Ka (1986) at the Pelikula at Lipunan film festival. The Movie and Television Review and Classification Board (MTRCB) named a conference room after her during a ceremony in 2017.

== Filmography ==
=== Film ===
Year	Title	Role	Ref(s):
1951	Prinsipe Amante sa Rubitanya		
1951	Amor mio		
1951	Venus		
1952	Tia Loleng		
1952	Korea		
1952	Digmaan ng damdamin		
1952	2 sundalong kanin		
1952	Haring Solomon at Reyna Sheba		
1952	Tenyente Carlos Blanco		
1952	Babaeng hampaslupa		
1952	Romansa sa nayon		
1953	Tumbalik na daigdig		
1953	Squatters		
1953	Batangueña		
1953	Hijo de familia		
1953	Hiyasmin		
1954	Dalaginding		
1954	Waray-waray	Upeng	
1954	Galawgaw	Pilar	
1954	Luneta		
1954	Tin-edger		
1955	Darling ko		
1955	Saydwok Bendor		
1955	Ang ibong Adarna		
1955	Indian pana		
1955	Ikaw kasi		
1955	Talusaling	Julieta	
1956	Handang matodas	Luping	
1956	Easy ka lang, padre!		
1956	Aling Kutsero		
1956	Medalyong perlas (Episode 4: Grand Finale		
1956	Ganyan ka pala		
1957	Sebya, Mahal kita		
1957	Kahelyera		
1957	Turista		
1957	Tingnan natin		
1957	Bahala	Bella Miraflor	
1958	Kastilaloy	Patring	
1958	Tuloy ang ligaya		
1958	Casa Grande (Episode:Third Story)		
1958	Wala Kang Paki		
1958	Rosalina		
1958	Anak ni Waray		
1958	Limang dalangin		
1959	Baguio Fever		
1959	Tayo'y magsaya		
1960	Navy Blues		
1961	My Serenade		
1961	Bakit ka nagtampo		
1961	Pitong gabi sa Paris		
1961	Walang sisihan		
1961	Sikat na, Siga pa		
1961	Awat na Adyang	Adyang	
1962	Jam Session		
1962	Gulo kung gulo		
1962	Bulung-bulungan		
1962	Oy... Akin yata 'yan		
1963	Sa atin ang daigdig		
1963	Limbo Rock		
1963	Ang Babaeng Sputnik	Babaeng Sputnik (Lead Role)	
1963	Adiang Waray	Adiang	
1963	Sosaything Tindera		
1963	Away na		
1963	Asyang ng La Loma		
1963	Ecu tatacut!		
1963	Isputnik vs Darna		
1963	Naku... Yabang!		
1963	Yeba!!! Chi! Qui! Chai!		
1964	Utos ni Tale hinde Mababale		
1964	Bumunot ka't Lumaban		
1964	Patsamba-tsamba		
1964	Everybody dance		
1964	Pulis walang kaparis		
1964	Si Doray naman...	Doray	
1964	Walang duwag na Bisaya		
1964	Mabilis... Paa at kamay		
1964	Pampatay Kaliwa at Kanan...!		
1964	Pamilya Galawgaw		
1965	Magkapatid na Jesse at James	Jesse	
1965	The Sound of Buwisit		
1966	Huwag kang sumingit		
1966	Utos Ni mayor		
1966	Wow na Wow!!		
1966	Adyang Batibot	Adyang Batibot	
1966	Shake Baby Shake		
1967	Together Again		
1967	Ayaw ni mayor		
1968	Tiririt ng maya, tiririt ng ibon		
1969	Goin' to a Go-Go		
1969	Pag-ibig masdan ang ginawa mo		
1970	Tulak ng bibig, kabig ng dibdib		
1970	Tayo'y mag up, up and away		
1970	Laugh Story		
1971	Family Planning		
1971	At the top		
1971	Laff Story		
1971	The Red Flag is up		
1980	John & Marsha'80	Marsha	
1980	The Quick Brown Fox		
1981	Familia Antik		
1982	My Heart Belongs to Daddy		
1982	Forgive and Forget	Nelly	
1982	Dancing Master 2: Macao Connection		
1983	Always in my heart	Rose	
1983	Saan darating ang umaga?	Lorrie Rodrigo	
1984	The Best of John en Marsha sa Pelikula	Marsha	
1984	Da Best of John & Marsha	Marsha	
1984	Anak ni Biday vs anak ni Waray		
1984	Sa hirap at ginhawa		
1985	John & Marsha'85	Marsha	
1985	Public Enemy No.2: Maraming Number 2		
1985	Miguelito		
1985	Like Father, Like Son		
1986	Magdusa ka!	Victoria "Toyang" Salvador	
1987	Prinsesang gusgusin		
1987	Family Tree		
1987	Kid, huwag Kang susuko		
1987	Ako si Kiko, ako si Kikay		
1988	Ibulong mo sa Diyos		
1988	Guhit ng Palad		
1988	Sa akin pa rin ang bukas		
1989	Impaktita		
1989	Elvis & James		
1989	Rosenda		
1990	Too Young		
1990	Mundo man ay magunaw		
1990	Hot Summer		
1990	Pangako ng Puso		
1991	Darna		
1991	John en Marsha ngayon'91		
1992	Tayong dalawa		
1992	Kamay Ni Cain		
1992	Shake Rattle & Roll IV		
1992	Mahal kita, walang iba		
1992	Aventures of Gary Leon at Kuting		
1993	Ligaw-Ligawan Kasal-kasalan bahay-bahayan (Segment: Bahay-bahayan)		
1993	Pido Dida 3: May Kambal na		
1993	Humanda ka Mayor!Bahala na ang Diyos		
1993	Di na Natuto (Sorry na, puede ba?)		
1994	Pinagbiyak na Bunga-Lookalike	Dorie	
1994	Geron Olivar	Aling Corazon	
1994	Kadenang Bulaklak	Elsa Abolencia	
1994	Vampira	Nena	
1994	Deadly Brothers		
1995	Ipaglaban Mo: The Movie	Magdalena	
1995	Ikaw pa... Eh love kita	Korina's aunt	
1995	Hataw na	Connie Tejeros	
1996	April Boys: Sana'y mahalin mo rin ako	Inay	
1996	Madrasta	Fides	
1996	Ang TV Movie: The Adarna Adventure	Cedes	
1997	Batang PX	Cedes	
1997	Babae	Lola Adora	
1997	Minsan lang magmahal	Auring	
1998	Ikaw pa rin ang iibigin	Dr. Tagle	
1998	Mother Ignacia:Ang uliran		
1998	Hiling	Lola Melyang	
1998	Sana pag-ibig na	Linda Perez	
1999	Mula sa puso: The Movie	Carmen	
1999	Soltera	Sandra's Mother	
2000	Yakapin mo ang umaga	Pacita	
2000	Biyaheng Langit	Lola Amor	
2001	Abakada...Ina	Matilda	
2001	Love text	Cielito	
2001	Ano bang Meron ka?	Mother Tering	
2002	Kung ikaw ay isang panaginip (Last movie appearance)	Fairy	

=== Television ===
Year	Title	Remarks
1960	The Nida-Nestor Show	
1966	Tangtarantang	
1973–1990	John en Marsha	
1990–1996	Lovingly Yours, Helen	
1991	Maalaala Mo Kaya	Episode: Valedictorian Medal
1992	Mana-Mana	
1993	GMA Telesine Specials	Episode: Tatlong Anino Ng Kahapon
1993	Maalaala Mo Kaya	Episode: Munting Bituin
1993–1995	Haybol Rambol	
1994	Maalaala Mo Kaya	Episode: Dancing Shoes
1994–1997	GMA True Stories	
1996–2002	Anna Karenina	
1997	Mula sa Puso	Main cast with Special Participation Carmen Buencamino
1997	Maalaala Mo Kaya	Episode: Pabango, lipstik at tsokolate
1998	Maalaala Mo Kaya	Episode: Pipa
1998	Maalaala Mo Kaya	Episode: Family Album
1999	Maalaala Mo Kaya	Episode: Forcep
1999–2001	Pwedeng Pwede	
2000	May Himala	
2001	Daddy Di Do Du (Last TV appearance)	Mammu Groovy

== Accolades ==
Awards and nominations received by Nida Blanca
Organizations	Year (Note: Indicates the year of ceremony. Each year is linked to the article about the awards held that year, wherever possible.)	Work	Category	Result	Ref(s)
Catholic Mass Media Awards	1986	Miguelito	Best Actress	Won	
Catholic Mass Media Awards	1987	Kid, Huwag Kang Susuko	Best Supporting Actress	Won	
Cinema One Originals Digital Film Festival	2009	Nida Blanca	Legend Award	Won	
FAMAS Awards	1953	Korea	Best Supporting Actress	Won	
FAMAS Awards	1955	Waray-waray	Best Actress	Nominated	
FAMAS Awards	1963	Oy... Akin Yata 'Yan	Best Actress	Nominated	
FAMAS Awards	1964	Naku... Yabang!	Best Actress	Nominated	
FAMAS Awards	1984	Saan Darating ang Umaga?	Best Actress	Nominated	
FAMAS Awards	1986	Miguelito	Best Actress	Nominated	
FAMAS Awards	1987	Magdusa Ka!	Best Supporting Actress	Won	
FAMAS Awards	1988	Kid, Huwag Kang Susuko	Best Supporting Actress	Won	
FAMAS Awards	1989	Ibulong Mo sa Diyos	Best Supporting Actress	Nominated	
FAMAS Awards	1995	Vampira	Best Supporting Actress	Nominated	
FAMAS Awards	1997	Nida Blanca	Lifetime Achievement Award	Won	
FAMAS Awards	1998	Babae	Best Supporting Actress	Nominated	
FAMAS Awards	1999	Sana Pag-ibig Na	Best Actress	Won	
Gawad Urian	1986	Miguelito	Best Actress	Won	
Gawad Urian	1987	Magdusa Ka!	Best Supporting Actress	Won	
Gawad Urian	1999	Sana Pag-ibig Na	Best Actress	Nominated	
Gawad Urian	2000	Nida Blanca	Lifetime Achievement Award	Won	
Luna Awards	1983	Saan Darating ang Umaga?	Best Actress	Nominated	
Luna Awards	1986	Miguelito	Best Actress	Won	
Luna Awards	1987	Magdusa Ka!	Best Supporting Actress	Won	
Luna Awards	1988	Kid, Huwag Kang Susuko	Best Supporting Actress	Won	
Luna Awards	1996	Ipaglaban Mo	Best Supporting Actress	Nominated	
Luna Awards	1998	Babae	Best Supporting Actress	Won	
Luna Awards	1999	Sana Pag-ibig Na	Best Actress	Nominated	
Luna Awards	2002	Nida Blanca	Lifetime Achievement Award	Won	
Metro Manila Film Festival	1975	Batu-Bato sa Langit	Best Supporting Actress	Won	
Metro Manila Film Festival	1991	Darna	Best Supporting Actress	Nominated	
Metro Manila Film Festival	1995	Babae	Best Supporting Actress	Won	
Metro Manila Film Festival	2001	Nida Blanca	Posthumous Award	Won	
Star Award for Movies	1986	Miguelito	Movie Actress of the Year	Won	
Star Award for Movies	1987	Magdusa Ka!	Movie Supporting Actress of the Year	Won	
Star Award for Movies	1999	Sana Pag-ibig Na	Movie Actress of the Year (Note: tied with Vilma Santos)	Won	
Young Critics Circle	1999	Sana Pag-ibig Na	Best Performance	Nominated	
