= Tony Santos Sr. =

Filipino film and television actor and director

- Born: Antonio Pineda Santos; April 10, 1920; Manila, Insular Government of the Philippine Islands
- Died: February 7, 1988 (aged 67); Manila, Philippines
- Occupation: Actor
- Years active: 1941–1988

Antonio Pineda Santos Sr. (April 10, 1920 – February 7, 1988), better known as Tony Santos Sr., was a Filipino film and television actor and director. He is known for his work as lead actor in Badjao and Anak Dalita, as well as for the roles he played in Sakada and Sister Stella L. He also appeared on the long-running TV series Flordeluna.

He has won best supporting actor awards from the Filipino Academy of Movie Arts and Sciences, the Philippine Movie Press Club, and the Manunuri ng Pelikulang Pilipino. He is one of Behn Cervantes' favorite Filipino actors.

== Selected filmography ==
Title	Year	Role	Notes	Ref.
1946	Garrison 13			
1950	Hantik			
1951	Prinsipe Amante ng Rubitanya			
1952	Korea			
1953	Dagohoy			
1954	Kandelerong Pilak			
1956	Child of Sorrow	Vic		
1957	Badjao	Hassan		
1959	Big Time Berto			
1959	Blessings of the Land	Jose		
1962	Magnum			
1963	Pinakamalaking Takas (ng 7 Atsay)			
1964	Scout Rangers			
1965	Tagisan ng mga Agimat			
1975	Araw-Araw, Gabi-Gabi			
1976	Hindi Kami Damong Ligaw			
1976	Sakada	Arsenio "Arsing" del Mundo		
1976	Babae... Sa Likod ng Salamin			
1979	Ang Alamat ni Julian Makabayan			
1982	Medalyang Ginto			
1983	Hot Property			
1984	Misteryo sa Tuwa	Ponsoy		
1984	Sister Stella L.	Ka Dencio		
1986	Gabi Na, Kumander	Apo Layug		
1987	The Untold Story of Melanie Marquez	Artemio		

== Death ==
Santos Sr. died on February 7, 1988, of an undisclosed cause; he was 67. He was buried in Manila North Cemetery in Santa Cruz, Manila.
