= Manuel Silos =

Filipino filmmaker

Manuel Silos (1 January 1906 – 31 March 1988) was a Filipino filmmaker from the 1920s through the 1950s. He began his career by making silent movies together with his brothers. As a bodabil (vaudeville) actor and comedian, Silos used the stage and screen name Santo Tulia. He appeared in romantic-comedy films such as Victory Joe in 1946, Puppy Love in 1956, and Tuloy and Ligaya (literally "Bliss Continues") in 1958. He became known for his FAMAS-awarded film Biyaya ng Lupa ("Blessings of the Land"). In 1979, Silos received the Natatanging Gawad Urian. In 1985, he received the Lifetime Achievement Award from the Film Academy of the Philippines (FAP).
