= ABS-CBN Film Archives =

Philippine film archive in Quezon City, Philippines

- Established: January 1, 1994
- Chair: Leo Katigbak
- Key people: Mary C. del Pilar; Julie N. Galino; Jane Sheila Ann C. Tenorio; Ferdinand T. Manalili; Meliza K. Oca; Eligio N.E. Macatangay Jr.; Froilan P. Tinay; Maria Carmela R. Barbaza; Kimberly C. Narciso; Marco Jerome L. Gatpandan
- Address: Eugenio Lopez Drive, Diliman, Quezon City, Metro Manila, Philippines
- Location: Metro Manila, Philippines
- Coordinates: 14°38′22.18″N 121°02′07.79″E
- Interactive map of ABS-CBN Film Archives

The ABS-CBN Film Archives, also called ABS-CBN Archives, is a state-of-the-art film archives in the Philippines located at the basement of ELJ Communications Center in Eugenio Lopez Drive, Diliman, Quezon City. It is a member of the Southeast Asia-Pacific Audio-Visual Archive Association (SEAPAVAA), as well as the Society of Filipino Archivists for Film (SOFIA). At present, ABS-CBN Film Archives holds around 2,400 Filipino films from Star Cinema, LVN Pictures, Regal Films, Viva Films, Seiko Films, Cinema Artists, Sampaguita Pictures, OctoArts Films, Athena Productions, Imus Productions, RVQ Productions, Cine Suerte, NV Productions along with the cinema libraries of Dolphy, Nora Aunor, Fernando Poe Jr., Rudy Fernandez, Ramon Revilla Sr., Bong Revilla and Armida Siguion-Reyna. ABS-CBN Film Archives holds the largest film collection in the country. It is headed by Leo Katigbak.

On August 31, 2020, ABS-CBN Film Archives along with Sagip Pelikula downsized its operations as part of the retrenchment by ABS-CBN Corporation after its new legislative franchise for the company's broadcasting operations was denied by the House of Representatives.

== Facility ==
The 500-square-meter (5,400 sq ft) facility of ABS-CBN Film Archives is covered with insulated walls. It has two film vaults: the medium-term vault and the long-term vault. The medium term vault holds betacam, U-matic, 1 inch tape, 16mm negatives and prints, and some 35mm negatives and prints while the long-term vault holds the 35mm negatives and master prints. The facility is protected by a special fire suppression system that uses halon gas instead of water. Acclimatization rooms are located between the vaults and the exit. Before a film could be taken out from the vault, it has to stay in the first acclimatization room for 24 hours and in the second acclimatization room for another 24 hours to prevent damage caused by condensation due to rapid temperature change. The temperature in the long-term vault is maintained between 8 and 10 °C with 31 to 35 percent relative humidity while in the medium-term vault, the temperature is maintained between 15 and 20 °C with 35 to 50 percent relative humidity. The air-conditioning system of the facility operates 24 hours a day. The facility is accessible to visitors for academic and research purposes.

== Digital film restoration ==
ABS-CBN Film Restoration Project was a digital film restoration and remastering project of ABS-CBN Film Archives in partnership with Central Digital Lab. The goal of the project was to digitally restore and remaster select films in the archives of ABS-CBN. As of 2015, the project restored and remastered over 100 films. Restoration cost ranged anywhere between two hundred thousand pesos and ten million pesos per film.
