= LVN Pictures =

Former Philippine film studio

- Logo of the film studio, originated from the 1941 film Ibong Adarna
- Type: Private
- Founded: 1938
- Defunct: 2005
- Fate: Closed by the De Leon family; Assets were later acquired by ABS-CBN Corporation
- Successors: Star Cinema (1993–present; film library)
- Headquarters: Quezon City, Metro Manila
- Key people: Doña Narcisa Buencamino De Leon
- Services: Film studio; Post-production
- Owners: De Leon family (1938–2005); Villongco family (1938–1960s); Navoa family (1938–1960s); ABS-CBN Corporation (2005–present)

LVN Pictures, Inc. was a Filipino film studio that was considered one of the biggest in the history of Philippine cinema and its foremost establishment in motion picture post-production until 2005. In its heyday of motion picture production, LVN Pictures has been compared to that of the Metro-Goldwyn-Mayer Studios (MGM) of Hollywood because it had, under contract, the biggest stars and film craftsmen of the period. Before its closure in 2005, LVN Pictures was known as one of the oldest living film studios in the country.

== History ==
=== Establishment and World War II (From 1938 to 1945) ===
LVN Pictures was formed by the De Leon ["L"], Villongco ["V"], and Navoa ["N"] families before the onset of World War II in 1938. At that time, the American-occupied Philippines was a ready market for American films, which further influenced various filmmakers like Jose Nepomuceno (the Father of Philippine Movies) to set up various film production companies to produce Tagalog movies.

With its creation, LVN Pictures offered a rival to then-newly established Sampaguita Pictures of the Vera-Perez family. LVN chose the big piece of land in P. Tuazon Boulevard, C. Benitez and St. Peter Street in Cubao, Quezon City as its home, and for the next seven decades, the lot would become the backlot and administration location of the studio. The LVN Gate, with the initials of the studio emblazoned in red letters and set in white beams, became as famous as the Paramount Pictures gate, and the big LVN Studios logo atop the Main Building became as famous as the MGM logo atop its main building. To oversee its production facilities, Doña Narcisa de Leon of the De Leon family took over the company as its president and "Executive Producer". She was the first Filipina film mogul. Eventually due to circumstances, the uninvolvement of the Villongco (which was preceded by the demise of one of the founders Carmen "Doña Mameng" Suarez Villongco) and Navoa families in the 1960s onwards, she bought a majority of their shares, which made LVN a De Leon family company.

The studio's first offering was the musical Giliw Ko (one of the very few Pre-War Filipino Films still extant today), which starred the three biggest stars of the era (Ely Ramos, Fernando Poe, Sr. and Fleur de Lis [who subsequently became Mona Lisa]) and introduced Mila del Sol. The movie, released in 1939, was a box-office success. In 1941, LVN introduced another trend. The first Filipino film in color (utilizing the "Varicolor" process), Ibong Adarna, was produced by LVN and was directed by Vicente Salumbides. The color sequence of the film, which was the singing of the bird, was painstakingly hand colored. The film also starred Mila del Sol, Fred Cortes and Manuel Conde and was a box-office success. Nevertheless, the growth of the studio was hampered due to World War II and the Japanese Occupation, which ravaged Manila and the rest of the Philippines from January 2, 1942, to February 1945. Due to the hardships of the war and to avoid being used as a Japanese propaganda center, LVN closed shop.

During this period, LVN Pictures has discovered and developed the following stars: Rogelio de la Rosa, Jaime de la Rosa, Mila del Sol, Fred Cortes, Norma Blancaflor, Lilia Dizon, Rosa Rosal, and Vicente Alberto to name a few.

=== Post-World War II years ===
After the Liberation of Manila in 1945, LVN Pictures immediately resumed film productions. The LVN stars who had to do stage shows when it closed shop was again making movies. LVN produced Miss Philippines (1947) with Norma Blancaflor and Jose "Pempe" Padilla, Jr., Ginang Takaichi (1948) with Lilia Dizon and Sa Tokyo Ikinasal (1948) with Rogelio de la Rosa, Tessie Quintana, Celia Flor and Armando Goyena, all of which pertain to the Japanese occupation of the Philippines. In the 1950s, at the height of the Communist threat in the Philippines, LVN Pictures collaborated with the Philippine government in vilifying communism by producing three films that were against Communism, namely Kontrabando (1950), FAMAS Award-winner Korea (1952), and FAMAS Best Picture Huk sa Bagong Pamumuhay (1953). Aside from these, LVN also produced its specialty, the musicals, namely Sarung Banggi (1947) and Mutya ng Pasig (1950), to name a few.

=== The Golden Age of Philippine Cinema (The 1950s) ===
The so-called First Golden Age of Philippine Cinema commenced in the 1950s with the flourishing establishment of the so-called Big Four studios, namely LVN Pictures, Sampaguita Pictures, Lebran International and Premiere Productions, with each studio specializing in different genres. Sampaguita Pictures specialized in high-glossed society pictures and musicals. Premiere Productions and Lebran International specialized in action pictures. LVN, on the other hand, became known for its "superproductions," the Hollywood equivalent of "epic" films that was complemented by the LVN superstars that starred in these films. The various superproductions of LVN were Ibong Adarna (1955), Lapu-Lapu (1955) and the movie classics Badjao (1956), Anak Dalita (1957) and Biyaya ng Lupa (1959). At this time, LVN Pictures emerged as the biggest film studio in the Philippines, releasing two to three films a month from 1955–1956.

Indeed, during this time, LVN Pictures housed the biggest and most popular stars of the period. With Narcisa de Leon still helming LVN Pictures, the studio managed to maintain its resident female contravida (antagonist) FAMAS-winner Rosa Rosal, the then undisputed King of Philippine Movies and FAMAS-winner Rogelio de la Rosa, FAMAS-nominee Lilia Dizon, FAMAS-winner Jose Padilla, Jr., Jaime de la Rosa, Celia Flor, Mila del Sol, Corazon Noble, Norma Blancaflor and a handful of other stars. In addition, LVN added to its roster FAMAS winners Charito Solis (introduced in Niña Bonita in 1955), Nida Blanca, Leroy Salvador, Armando Goyena, Tony Santos, Sr., Oscar Keesee, Gil de Leon, Eddie Rodriguez and a handful of other stars. Delia Razon, Daisy Romualdez, Nestor de Villa, Mario Montenegro, Norma Vales, Lou Salvador, Jr., Marita Zobel and Sylvia La Torre are the other stars added to LVN during this period. In addition to stars, LVN also prided itself in the film artisans that it had on contract. The make-up legend Manahan Sisters, directors Lamberto Avellana and Gerardo de Leon (who became FAMAS winners), musician Tito Arevalo and editor Ike Jarlego were few of the many talented film artisans that were, one year or another, in contract with the studio.

LVN Pictures prided itself on the creation of what was perhaps the most popular love team of all time, the Nida Blanca-Nestor de Villa love team. The two stars, who were also gifted in the field of dancing and singing, gave LVN a boost on the box-office with their films Waray-Waray (1954), Kalyehera (1957), and Talusaling (1958). The love team gave Sampaguita Pictures a competition, which led them to build up their number-one star, Gloria Romero, with the dashing Luis Gonzales. Nevertheless, the Nida-Nestor love team had one thing that the Gloria-Luis lacked: the gift of dance. Nida-Nestor danced their way to the box-office, and even later to television with their own show.

In addition, LVN's desire to equal Sampaguita Pictures' drama excellence was also answered. By the 1950s, Sampaguita drama empresses Lolita Rodriguez, Marlene Dauden and Rita Gomez were already held in check by LVN's very own drama empress Charito Solis. Charito Solis starred in the blockbuster films Malvarosa (1958), Kundiman ng Lahi (1959) and Emily (1960). To answer for the hugely popular action films of Premiere Productions and Lebran International, LVN also developed its resident hunk Mario Montenegro, Jaime de la Rosa and Jose Padilla, Jr., to do action films like Huk sa Bagong Pamumuhay (1953) and Lapu-Lapu (1955). LVN also featured its own roster of antagonists or contravidas which brought "hell" to Filipino screens like Eusebio Gomez, Oscar Keesee, Jr., Rosa Rosal, Gil de Leon, Rebecca del Rio and Rosa Aguirre to name a few. LVN also had under contract the brightest singing stars of the period like Diomedes Maturan, Sylvia La Torre and Marita Zobel. La Torre later teamed up with Eddie San Jose in LVN's series of comedies starring the team of Pugo and Bentot.

In 1955, LVN Pictures again set another landmark by remaking Ibong Adarna in 1955, starring the then-popular love team of Nida Blanca and Nestor de Villa. The movie became the first Filipino film to ever grossed one million pesos and hugely promoted the love team of Blanca and de Villa. In 1956, LVN brought international fame to the Philippines when its superproduction Badjao (1956) starring Rosa Rosal won the Golden Harvest Award (Best Picture) at the Asia-Pacific Film Festival. From this point on, LVN's superproductions figured in various film festivals and competitions all over the world, winning Best Picture Awards and acting awards in the process.

In the local scene, LVN Pictures also dominated the Awards of the Filipino Academy of Movie Arts and Sciences (FAMAS Awards) by amassing a total of 11 nominations for Best Picture. In total, it won 4 Best Picture awards, 1 Best Short Film Award, and 1 Best Featurette Award. In addition, LVN Pictures holds the record for the most FAMAS International Prestige Awards of Merit, the award of the FAMAS that gives recognition to productions that were recognized internationally. At a time when movie studios were only receiving one or two of these in a decade, LVN managed to collect four of them for the films Anak Dalita (1957), Malvarosa (1958), Bayanihan and My Serenade (both 1961).

Nevertheless, due to the heavy competition that LVN Pictures experienced from Hollywood films and even local television, the Golden Age of Philippine cinema was the only boost it needed to survive as a corporation.

=== The 1960s and onwards ===
On May 31, 1961, LVN stopped producing motion pictures and suddenly decided to switch to post-production. The decision was not surprising; even though LVN was releasing box-office successes, the earnings from these films were used to pay off existing loans and debts from various Philippine banks. By 1961, LVN Pictures was already nearing practical bankruptcy due to "causes beyond its control." In 1961, LVN Pictures had already cut back the salaries of its workers by 5-20% while its losses for the year were already more than P333,000. But LVN is not alone; among the rest of the Big Four, only Sampaguita Pictures survived to the seventies, and even this famed studio later closed shop in the eighties.

The stars of LVN Pictures became freelancers when LVN stopped its production of films, many of whom went to its sister company, Dalisay Pictures. The remaining moviemaking equipment of LVN such as cameras, lights, and others were loaned to various movie outfits and independent producers such as Cirio Santiago, Larry Santiago Productions, Dalisay Pictures, People's Pictures, and others at P13,000 per picture. In the meantime, LVN Pictures moved to post-production, which specialized in color processing and editing of films for Philippine cinema and advertising. For the next forty years, LVN engaged in post-production, which was said to be the best in Asia.

In 1977 and 1980, LVN Pictures made two attempts at movie production with the releases of the romantic drama Kung Mangarap Ka't Magising and the hugely successful comedy Kakabakaba Ka Ba? (1980) starring Christopher de Leon, Charo Santos, Jay Ilagan and Sandy Andolong. The movie earned LVN Pictures its last nomination for Best Picture at the FAMAS Awards.

=== Closure ===
In 2005, LVN Pictures also decided to close its post-production facilities at the old studio lot, which was now almost decrepit due to forty years of non-film production. The reason for LVN Pictures' final closure was the lessening number of Filipino films that availed of their post-production services. Indeed, the Philippine film industry was already slumping to 53 films a year. The costs of maintaining the equipment at the LVN Studios exceeded the revenue that it received from post-production, so on June 30, 2005, LVN's post-production equipment went up for sale and was bought by an unnamed group of businessmen. Nevertheless, the LVN Museum, the lot, and the studio buildings themselves were not part of the buy-out. At the time of the purchase, the whole LVN Pictures was valued at ₱45 million.

After the studio's closure, LVN's studios in Cubao, Quezon City was turned into a high-rise building.

=== Legacy ===
LVN Pictures is the first of its kind in Philippine movie history. It was the movie studio that set many trends at the forefront of Philippine cinema. At the time of its height, it was also the biggest studio of the time, nestling under its wing countless number of stars that went on to become Filipino screen legends, acclaimed directors that helmed Filipino film classics and numerous film artisans that helped define the Filipino film. It was even recognized by its three-film tie-up with the Philippine government during the Communist threat era of the 1950s.

To maintain the legacy of LVN Pictures and the films it made, ABS-CBN Corporation, the Philippines' largest media conglomerate, bought LVN Pictures productions shortly after its closure and showcased them from time to time in its television film arm, Cinema One, which is aired not only in the Philippines but also in many parts of the world. The films are now also being archived in the state-of-the-art facilities of ABS-CBN Network.

=== Digital restoration ===
The ABS-CBN Film Archives is responsible for protecting and storing the LVN classics in their vaults at the ELJ Communications Center in Quezon City as well as the props and costumes used by the actors in the films, as part of their agreement.

With the advent of the digital age, ABS-CBN's Sagip Pelikula campaign restored some of the black and white LVN classics including Ibong Adarna (1941), Anak Dalita (1956), Badjao (1957), Malvarosa (1958), and Biyaya ng Lupa (1959) through 4K digital scans and partial restorations. The LVN films directed by Mike de Leon, Kung Mangarap Ka't Magising and Kakabakaba Ka Ba?, were respectively restored and remastered by ABS-CBN with the help of Central Digital Lab in Makati City and L'Immagine Ritrovata in Bologna, Italy.

== List of LVN Pictures films ==
- 1939 - Giliw Ko: Fernando Poe, Ely Ramos, Mila del Sol and Fleur de Lis (Mona Lisa) (first LVN film, produced in 1938)
- 1941 - Ibong Adarna: Mila del Sol, Fred Cortes, Ester Magalona
- 1946 - Ang Prinsiping Hindi Tumatawa: Rogelio de la Rosa & Mila del Sol
- 1946 - Garrison 13: Rogelio de la Rosa, Jaime de la Rosa, Mila del Sol & Linda Estrella
- 1946 - Aladin: Jaime de la Rosa
- 1946 - Orasang Ginto: Mila del Sol & Elvira Reyes
- 1946 - Victory Joe: Rogelio de la Rosa & Norma Blancaflor
- 1947 - Miss Philippines: Jose Padilla, Jr. & Norma Blancaflor
- 1947 - Bagong Manunubos
- 1947 - Ikaw ay Akin
- 1947 - Binatang Taring
- 1947 - Romansa
- 1947 - Magkaibang Lahi: Corazon Noble & Ely Ramos
- 1947 - Sarung Banggi: Rogelio de la Rosa & Mila del Sol
- 1948 - Kaaway ng Babae: Jose Padilla, Jr. & Lilia Dizon
- 1948 - Kambal Na Ligaya: Leopoldo Salcedo & Lilia Dizon
- 1948 - Engkantada
- 1948 - Krus na Bituin
- 1948 - Waling-Waling
- 1948 - Tanikalang papel
- 1948 - Pista sa Nayon: Jose Padilla, Jr.& Rebecca Gonzales
- 1948 - Sa Tokyo Ikinasal: Rogelio de la Rosa, Celia Flor, Armando Goyena & Tessie Quintana
- 1948 - Manugang at Biyenan: Norma Blancaflor, Naty Bernardo
- 1948 - Sierra Madre, bundok ng hiwaga: Leopoldo Salcedo
- 1948 - Sumpaan: Ely Ramos & Rosa Rosal
- 1949 - Biglang Yaman: Jaime de la Rosa, Rosa Rosal, Pugo & Togo
- 1949 - Capas: Leopoldo Salcedo & Celia Flor
- 1949 - Parola: Jaime de la Rosa & Norma Blancaflor
- 1949 - Gitano
- 1949 - Tambol Mayor
- 1949 - Batalyon XIII: Jaime de la Rosa & Carmen Rosales
- 1949 - Don Juan Teñoso
- 1950 - Mutya ng Pasig: Jose Padilla, Jr., Rebecca Gonzales, Roger Nite, Teody Belarmino & Delia Razon
- 1950 - Nuno sa Punso: Mila del Sol & Jaime de la Rosa
- 1950 - Kontrabando: Jaime de la Rosa & Celia Flor
- 1950 - Hantik
- 1950 - In Despair
- 1950 - Prinsipe Amante: Rogelio de la Rosa & Delia Razon
- 1951 - Reyna Elena
- 1951 - Satur: Manuel Conde, Jaime de la Rosa, Delia Razon
- 1951 - Anak ng Pulubi
- 1951 - Shalimar
- 1951 - Probinsiyano
- 1951 - Amor mio
- 1951 - Haring Kobra: Rogelio dela Rosa, Lilia Dizon
- 1951 - Pag-asa
- 1951 - Prinsipe Amante sa Rubitanya: Rogelio dela Rosa, Delia Razon
- 1951 - Venus
- 1952 - Rodrigo de Villa: Delia Rzon & Mario Montenegro
- 1952 - Korea: Jaime de la Rosa, Tony Santos Sr., Leroy Salvador & Nida Blanca
- 1952 - Sa Paanan ng Nazareno
- 1952 - Taong Paniki: Jaime de la Rosa, Delia Razon
- 1952 - Kabalyerong Itim
- 1952 - Haring Solomon at Reyna Sheba: Mila del Sol
- 1952 - Dalawang Sundalong Kanin
- 1952 - Kambal Tuko
- 1952 - Amor Mio
- 1952 - Tenyente Carlos Blanco
- 1952 - Hagad: Armando Goyena, Carmencita Abad & Rosa Rosal
- 1953 - Huk Sa Bagong Pamumuhay: Jose Padilla, Jr. & Celia Flor
- 1953 - Kuwentong Bahay-Bahayan: Rolando Acuzar & Nora Dy
- 1953 - Pusong May Lason: Delia Razon & Mario Montenegro
- 1953 - Loida
- 1953 - Batanguena: Jaime dela Rosa, Nida Blanca
- 1953 - Dalaguinding
- 1953 - Hijo de Familia
- 1953 - Hiyasmin
- 1953 - Squatters
- 1953 - Loida: Ang Aking Pag-ibig
- 1953 - Tumbalik ng Daigdig: Nida Blanca & Nestor de Villa
- 1953 - Kidlat... Ngayon: Armando Goyena
- 1953 - Dagohoy: Mario Montenegro and Tessie Quintana
- 1954 - Waray-Waray: Nestor de Villa & Nida Blanca
- 1954 - Galawgaw: Jaime de la Rosa & Nida Blanca
- 1954 - Hiyasmin: Nida Blanca & Nestor de Villa
- 1954 - Dambanang Putik: Delia Razon & Mario Montenegro
- 1954 - Dalawang Panata
- 1954 - Virtuoso: Jaime dela Rosa & Delia Razon
- 1954 - Doce Pares
- 1954 - Donato
- 1954 - Tinalikdang Dambana
- 1954 - Luneta
- 1954 - Tin-edyer
- 1955 - Ibong Adarna: Nida Blanca and Nestor De Villa
- 1955 - Lapu-Lapu: Mario Montenegro & Delia Razon
- 1955 - Niña Bonita: Jaime de la Rosa, Milagros Naval, Gil de Leon & Charito Solis
- 1955 - Saydwok Vendor: Nida Blanca & Jaime de la Rosa
- 1955 - Dinayang Pagmamahal: Jaime de la Rosa, Charito Solis & Rebecca del Rio
- 1955 - Darling Ko
- 1955 - Talusaling: Nida Blanca
- 1955 - Dalagang Taring: Delia Razon & Nestor de Villa
- 1955 - Higit sa Lahat: Rogelio dela Rosa & Emma Alegre
- 1955 - Ikaw Kasi: Nida Blanca & Nestor de Villa
- 1956 - Charito, I Love You: Charito Solis, Leroy Salvador & Nita Javier
- 1956 - No Money... No Honey: Jaime de la Rosa
- 1956 - Anak Dalita: Rosa Rosal & Tony Santos, Sr.
- 1956 - Luksang Tagumpay: Jaime de la Rosa, Delia Razon, Rebecca del Rio & Eddie Rodriguez
- 1956 - Medalyong Perlas
- 1956 - Kumander 13
- 1956 - Aling Kutsero
- 1956 - Handang Matodas: Nida Blanca, Nestor de Villa & Nita Javier
- 1956 - Among Tunay: Delia Razon & Mario Montenegro
- 1956 - Ilaw Sa Karimlan: Delia Razon & Mario Montenegro
- 1957 - Tiririt ng Ibon: Charito Solis & Leroy Salvador
- 1957 - Badjao: Rosa Rosal & Tony Santos Sr.
- 1957 - Hukom Roldan: Jaime de la Rosa, Emma Alegre
- 1957 - Turista: Nida Blanca & Nestor de Villa
- 1957 - Bahala Na
- 1957 - Kalyehera
- 1957 - El Robo: Delia Razon, Armando Goyena
- 1957 - Sampung Libong Pisong Pag-ibig: Charito Solis, Eddie Rodriguez & Jose Ejercito (Joseph Estrada)
- 1957 - Walang Sugat: Charito Solis, Tony Santos Sr. & Mario Montenegro
- 1958 - Barkada
- 1958 - Faithful: Lou Salvador, Jr., Marita Zobel, Jaime de la Rosa & Rosa Rosal
- 1958 - Casa Grande: Nestor de Villa
- 1958 - Malvarosa: Charito Solis & Leroy Salvador
- 1958 - Tuloy ang Ligaya: Nida Blanca
- 1958 - Ang Langit Ko'y Ikaw: Charito Solis, Nestor de Villa, Liza Moreno & Willie Sotelo
- 1958 - Villa Milagrosa: Charto Solis, Nestor de Villa, Eddie Rodriguez & Nita Javier
- 1959 - Biyaya ng Lupa: Rosa Rosal & Tony Santos Sr.
- 1959 - Wala Kang Paki
- 1959 - Kundiman ng Lahi: Charito Solis
- 1959 - Tuko Sa Madre Kakao: Nita Javier, Willie Sotelo, Hector Reyes & Luz Valdez
- 1960 - Black Beauty: Charito Solis & Bernard Bonnin
- 1960 - Nukso nang Nukso: Pugo, Togo
- 1960 - Bakit ka Nagtampo
- 1960 - Unos Sa Laot: Charito Solis and Nestor de Villa
- 1960 - Kung Ako'y Mahal Mo: Charito Solis & Nestor de Villa
- 1960 - Emily: Charito Solis, Pancho Magalona, Leroy Salvador & Eddie Rodriguez
- 1961 - Oh Sendang!: Sylvia La Torre, Pugo, Togo
- 1961 - Sandata at Pangako: Fernando Poe Jr. & Charito Solis
- 1977 - Kung Mangarap Ka't Magising: Christopher de Leon & Hilda Koronel
- 1980 - Kakabakaba Ka Ba?: Christopher de Leon, Charo Santos, Jay Ilagan, & Sandy Andolong (distribution by D'Wonder Films)
- 1981 - Batch '81: Mark Gil, Sandy Andolong, Ward Luarca, Noel Trinidad (co-production with Sampaguita Pictures and MVP Pictures)

== See also ==
- Narcisa de Leon
- José Corazón de Jesús, Jr.
