= List of Philippine films before 1940 =

A list of the early pre-war films produced in the Philippines from 1912 to 1939. For an A-Z see Category:Philippine films

== 1905–1929 ==
Title	Director	Cast	Production Company	Genre	Notes
1905
Luzon Lingerie				Short film / Documentary	first well-documented film (short) produced, made and released in the Philippines
1912
El Fusilamiento de Jose Rizal	Albert Yearsley			Short film	the first film produced and made in the Philippines to be released
La vida de Jose Rizal	Edward M. Gross		Oriental Moving Picture, Rizalina Film Manufacturing Company	Historical / Period	first feature-length film produced and made in the Philippines to be released
La Vida y Muerte del Gran Martir Filipino, Dr. Jose Rizal	Albert Yearsley		Oriental Moving Picture	Short film	
1913
Walang Sugat	Albert Yearsley	Jose Tolentino, Atang de la Rama		Short film	
1915
Noli Me Tángere	Albert Yearsley		Rizalina Film Manufacturing Company	Short film	earliest screen adaptation of Jose Rizal's popular novel
1919
Dalagang Bukid (aka Countryside Maiden, Farm Lady, Mountain Lady)	José Nepumuceno	Atang de la Rama, Mar I. Esmeralda	Malayan Movies	Drama, Romance	first Filipino feature-length film
Los Petalos De Lao-Tze					
La Venganza de Don Silvestre (The Vengeance of Don Silvestre)	José Nepumuceno		Malayan Movies	Drama, Action	
1920
La Mariposa Negra	José Nepumuceno		Malayan Movies	Drama	
1921
El Capullo Marchito	José Nepumuceno		Malayan Movies	Drama	
1922
Estrellita Del Cine	José Nepumuceno		Malayan Movies	Drama	
1923
Hoy o nuca, bésame	José Nepumuceno		Malayan Movies	Drama	
1924
Sampaguita	José Nepumuceno		Malayan Movies	Drama	
1925
Ang Pagtitipid	José Nepumuceno	Armando Crisostomo	Malayan Movies	Drama, Romance	
Miracles of Love	Vicente Salumbides	Juanita Angeles, Jose Carvajal, Dimples Cooper		Drama, Romance	
1926
Ang Tatlong Hambog	José Nepumuceno	Luis Tuason, Dimples Cooper	Malayan Movies	Comedy, Romance	First kissing scene in a Filipino film
Fate and Consequence	Vicente Salumbides	Raymunda Guidote Abila			
1927
Ang Manananggal	José Nepumuceno	Mary Walter	Malayan Movies	Horror	first Filipino horror film
Hot Kisses	José Nepumuceno	Gregorio Fernandez, Georgina Hernandez, Georgianna Hollis, Hector Nieto, Luis Tuazon, Conchita Young, Salvador Zaragoza	Malayan Movies	Romance	
The Filipino Woman	José Nepumuceno	Juanita Angeles, Gregorio Fernandez, Eva Lyn	Malayan Movies	Drama	
The Three Tramps	Manuel Silos	Augusto Silos, Octavio Silos, Manuel Silos	Wack-Wack Pictures	Comedy	first feature-length comedy film and first Filipino comic trio
La Mujer Filipina			Malayan Movies		Produced by José Nepumuceno
1928
Ang Lumang Simbahan	José Nepumuceno	Juanita Angeles, Gregorio Fernandez, Naty Fernandez, Sofia Lotta, Aniceto Robledo, Mary Walter	Malayan Movies	Drama	First appearance of the first love team in Philippine cinema (Fernandez and Walter)
1929
Sa Landas ng Pag-ibig	José Nepumuceno	Annie Harris, Domingo Principe, Paquito Villa	Malayan Movies	Romance	Based on the novel by Deogracias del Rosario
Nanay Ko		Mary Walter		Drama	
Ang Mutya ng Pamilihan	José Nepumuceno	Juanita Angeles, Maneng Eloriaga, Sofia Lotta, Francisco Varona, Paquito Villa, Paco Zamora	Malayan Movies	Drama, Romance	
Desperation		Mary Walter	Malayan Movies	Drama	
Patria Amore	Julian Manansala			Drama	

== 1930s ==
Title	Director	Cast	Production Company	Genre	Notes
1930
Bago Lumubog ang Araw		Rogelio de la Rosa, Gerardo de Leon, Mona Lisa, Rosita Rivera, Maria Clara Ruiz, Gregorio Ticman	Malayan Movies	Drama	
Dugo sa Kapirasong Lupa				Action, War	film depicts the Japanese Army during First Sino-Japanese War
Noli Me Tangere	José Nepumuceno	Chito Calvo, Monang Carvajal, Celia Marcaida	Malayan Movies	Drama, Historical, Period	first Filipino screen adaptation of Jose Rizal's popular novel.
Oriental Blood	Carlos Vander Tolosa	Annie Harris, Atang de la Rama, Purita Clarino, Jose Corazon de Jesus, Jr., Carmen Rosales		Action, Drama	
Prinsipe Teñoso		Mary Walter		Adventure, Fantasy	
Infierno sa Mundo	Manuel Silos	Faustino Maurat	Banahaw Pictures	Drama, fantasy	
Ang Anak sa Ligaw	José Nepumuceno	Gregorio Fernandez, Nena Linda, Rosita Rivera	Malayan Movies	Drama	based on the novel by Julian Cruz Balmaseda
Sa Mutya ng Libingan		Jose Padilla, Jr., Rita Rica		Horror	
Mystery of the Convent	Manuel Silos	Naty Fernandez, Eduardo de Castro		Drama	
Maria Luisa		Mary Walter, Manuel Ramirez		Drama	
Dugong Makamandag	Manuel Silos	Eduardo de Castro, Fermin Barva		Action	
1931
Ang Monghita	José Nepumuceno	Jose Padilla, Jr., Rosita Rivera, Antonia Santos	Malayan Pictures Corporation	Drama	
La Monjita		Rosa Rivera, Carlos Padilla, Sr.	Malayan Pictures Corporation	Musical	probably the first Filipino musical
Moro Pirates	José Nepumuceno	Eduardo de Castro, Gregorio Fernandez, Nena Linda, Mary Walter	Malayan Pictures Corporation	Action	
Ang Lihim ni Bathala	José Nepumuceno	Gregorio Fernandez, Mary Walter	Malayan Pictures Corporation	Drama, fantasy	
Dalaga		Mary Walter	Malayan Pictures Corporation		
1932
Ilaw ng Kapitbahay		Mary Walter	Banahaw Pictures		
Satanas		Alma Bella, Rosa del Rosario, Carlos Padilla, Sr., Billy Surot Viscarra			
Sa Pinto ng Langit	José Nepumuceno	Juanita Angeles, Alma Bella, Jose Corazon de Jesus, Jr.	LVN Pictures		
Luha	Fausto J. Galauran	Rosa Rivera, Jamie Castelvi, Francisco Zamora, Violeta del Prado	Jose Nepomuceno Productions		
Lantang Bulaklak	Emmanuel H. Borlaza	Manuel Barbeyto, Norma del Rosario, Rosa del Rosario			
Sa Labi ng Lumang Libingan		Monang Carvajal, Fidel del Barva, Mary Walter	Banahaw Pictures		
Ligaw na Bulaklak	José Nepumuceno	Rogelio de la Rosa, Rosa del Rosario, Tina del Rosario, Gregorio Fernandez			
Tianak	José Nepumuceno	Rosa del Rosario, Rogelio de la Rosa	Malayan Pictures Corporation	Drama, Horror	
Ang Gayuma		Mary Walter	Banahaw Pictures	Fantasy	
Mang Tano		Mary Walter	Malayan Pictures Corporation		
Impyerno sa Mundo		Mary Walter			
Ulong Inasnan		Rogelio de la Rosa			
1933
Ang Aswang	George Musser	Celia Burgos-Xerxes, Monang Carvajal, Mary Walter	Manila Talkatone	Horror	first sound film
Nahuling Pagsisisi		Rogelio de la Rosa			
Punyal na Ginto	José Nepumuceno	Alma Bella, Naty Bernardo, Tina del Rosario, Ramon Estella, Carlos Padilla, Sr., Paco Zamora	Malayan Pictures Corporation		first Filipino-language talkie film
Ang Ganid		Vicente Abo, Loretta Andrada, Soledad Aquino			
Nahuling Pagsisisi		Soledad Aquino			
Doctor Kuba		Monang Carvajal, Don Dano, Rosa del Rosario			
Mag-inang Ulila	Manuel Silos				
Makata at Paraluman	José Nepumuceno	Carlos Padilla, Sr., Rosita Rivera	Malayan Pictures Corporation	Drama, Musical	First full-length complete talking film in vernacular
Magkabilang Mukha		Violeta del Campo, Carlos Padilla, Sr.	Premiere Productions	Thriller	
Ang Mga Ulila		Rosa del Rosario, Paco Zamora			
1934
Mag-Inang Mahirap	Manuel Silos	Rosa del Rosario, Paula Maurat, Tor Villano	Filippine Productions	Drama	
X3X	Fermin Barva	Monang Carvajal, Norma del Rosario, Rosa del Rosario, Carlos Padilla, Sr., Mary Walter	Filippine Productions	Action	
Sa Tawag ng Diyos		Naty Bernardo, Norma del Rosario, Rosa del Rosario, Manuel Ortega, Carlos Padilla, Sr.		Drama	
Sawing Palad	José Nepumuceno	Rogelio de la Rosa, Leopoldo Salcedo	Nepomuceno Productions	Drama	First film of Leopoldo Salcedo
Dinukot		Norma del Rosario	Paragon Pictures	Drama	
Anting-anting	Manuel Silos	Rosa del Rosario, Jesus Llorente, Tor Villano	Filippine Productions	Fantasy	
Anak ng Bilanggo		Rosa del Rosario, Carlos Padilla, Sr., Victor Sevilla		Drama	
Liwayway ng Kalayaan	Manuel Silos	Mary Walter	Filippine Productions	Action, Drama	
Ang Dangal		Gerardo de Leon, Angel Esmeralda, Patsy		Drama	
Pag-iimbot	Manuel Silos	Eduardo de Castro, Faustino Maurat, Norma del Rosario	Filippine Productions	Drama	
Dasalang Pilak		Tito Arevalo			film debut of Tito Arevalo
Kamay ng Diyos		Ana-Maria, Loretta Andrada, Carlos Padilla, Sr.		Drama, Fantasy	
Hinagpis ng Magulang	Manuel Silos	Pedro Faustino, Paula Maurat, Carlos Padilla, Sr., Torcuato Reyes, Mary Walter	Filippine Productions	Drama	
Krus na Bato		Ana-Maria, Manuel Barbeyto		Drama	
1935
Awit ng Pag-ibig		Norma del Rosario, Rosa del Rosario		Romance	
Mahiwagang Biyolin	Manuel Conde	Manuel Conde, Fely Cuevas, Gregorio Ticman		Drama, Fantasy	first acting and directorial debut for Manuel Conde
Sor Matilde		Florentino Ballecer, Norma del Rosario, Gregorio Ticman			
Anak ng Birhen		Rosa del Rosario, Pedro Faustino, Carlos Padilla, Sr.		Religious Drama	
Hatol ng Langit		Norma del Rosario, Pedro Faustino, Manuel Ortega		Drama	
Ang Gulong ng Buhay	Manuel Silos	Fermin Barva, Rosa del Rosario, Pedro Faustino, Mary Walter	Filippine Productions	Drama	
Sumpa ng Aswang		Monang Carvajal, Rudy Concepcion, Rosa del Rosario, Mary Walter	Filippine Productions	Horror	
Kuwintas ng Himuntok		Fely Cuevas, Rosa del Rosario, Jose Padilla, Jr., Carlos Padilla, Sr., Gregorio Ticman, Mary Walter	Filippine Productions	Drama, Fantasy	Supposed to be a bit player in the film, Manuel Conde was given the line "maupo ka" (seat down). He practiced the line for a week. Upon seeing the camera during the shooting, his mind went blank and failed to utter the word. He was fired from the production.
Kalbario		Naty Bernardo, Gregorio Ticman			
Kundiman ng Puso		Rudy Concepcion		Musical	first romantic musical, film debut of Rudy Concepcion
Ina		Naty Bernardo			
Himala ni Bathala		Monang Carvajal, Pedro Faustino, Nena Garcia, Gregorio Ticman, Mary Walter	Filippine Productions		
Santong Diablo	José Nepumuceno	Leopoldo Salcedo	Nepomuceno Productions	Fantasy	
Anak ng Pare	José Nepumuceno	Leopoldo Salcedo	Nepomuceno Productions		
1936
Ang Buhok ni Ester		Manuel Barbeyto, Rudy Concepcion, Rosa del Rosario, Mary Walter	Filippine Productions	Drama	
Anak-Dalita	Mar I. Esmeralda	Soledad Aquino, Rosario Moreno, Carlos Padilla, Sr.		Drama	
Awit ng Ulila	Mar I. Esmeralda	Armando Crisostomo, Tita Duran, Elsa Oria		Drama	
Diwata ng Karagatan	Carlos Vander Tolosa	Mari Velez	Parlatone Hispano Filipino	Drama, Romance	
Kalupitan ng Tadhana		Rogelio de la Rosa			
Lagablab ng Kabataan	Manuel Silos	Rogelio de la Rosa, Sylvia Rosales, Juanito Carriedo, Eddie Unson, Nati Rubi, Paquito Villa, Lou Salvador	Parlatone Hispano Filipino	Comedy	
Sa Paanan ng Krus		Soledad Aquino, Tito Arevalo, Armando Crisostomo, Tita Duran, Angel Esmeralda, Cecilio Joaquin, Rosario Moreno, Carlos Padilla, Sr., Antonia Santos, Mari Velez		Drama	
Ama	Agapito Concho	Norma del Rosario, Rosa del Rosario, Pedro Faustino		Drama	
Ang Kambal	Mar I. Esmeralda	Rosario Moreno, Carlos Padilla, Sr., Nati Rubi, Lina Violeta			
Hampas-lupa	Mar I. Esmeralda	Armando Crisostomo, Carlos Padilla, Sr.		Drama	
Malambot na Bato	Fermin Barva	Norma del Rosario, Cecilio Joaquin, Gregorio Ticman, Juanita Angeles, Ester Tabuena, Artemio Tabuena	Filippine Productions		
Luha ng Ina		Soledad Aquino		Drama	
Birhen Walang Dambana		Naty Bernardo, Rosa del Rosario, Fernando Poe, Sr., Armando Villa, Mary Walter	Filippine Productions	Drama	
Hagase Tu Voluntad		Norma del Rosario, Pedro Faustino, Manuel Ortega,			
Ang Itinapon		Leopoldo Salcedo	Parlatone Hispano Filipino		
Carromata Cinderella		Quiteria Alegre		Drama, Children's Fairytale	first Filipino screen adaptation of a children's fairytale
Mga Kaluluwang Napaligaw		Nela Alvarez, Teddy Benavidez, Carlos Padilla, Sr., Quiel Segovia		Horror	Teddy Benavidez was introduced in this film as Teodoro Benavidez
Gagamba	Mar I. Esmeralda	Carlos Padilla, Sr., Maria Clara Ruiz, Angelita Rey, Quiel Segovia, Alfredo Javier, Teddy Benavidez	Parlatone Hispano Filipino		
1937
Zamboanga aka Fury In Paradise	Eduardo de Castro	Fernando Poe, Sr., Rosa del Rosario	Filippine Productions	Drama, Romance	This film was first telecast on New York City's pioneer television station W2XBS on July 4, 1940.
Sampaguitang Walang Bango		Leopoldo Salcedo	Filippine Productions		
Nasaan Ka Irog	Carlos Vander Tolosa	Elsa Oria, Angel Esmeralda, Tito Arevalo, Prima Vera, SSS Trio, Troubadours Moonlight, Bimbo Danao, Orchestra Symphony Parlatone, Nati Rubi, Billy Surot Viscarra, Mila del Sol	Parlatone Hispano Filipino	Drama, Musical	Mila del Sol was introduced in this movie
Ilaw ng Langit	Tor Villano	Manuel Barbeyto, Jose Padilla, Jr., Rosita Rivera		Drama	
Mga Pusong Dakila		Teddy Benavidez, Gerardo de Leon, Angel Esmeralda, Rosario Moreno, Lina Violeta		Drama	
Asahar at Kabaong	Gregorio Fernandez	Rosa del Rosario, Jose Padilla, Jr., Gregorio Fernandez, Angelita Rey, Consuelo Ruiz	Filippine Productions		
Brides of Sulu	John Nelson	James J. Gilbert, Adelina Moreno, Eduardo de Castro, Armanda Mangbitang, Gregorio Ticman	Exploration Pictures Corp., Universal Pictures	Drama, Romance	
Gamu-gamong Naging Lawin	Fermin Barva	Monang Carvajal, Rosa del Rosario, Leopoldo Salcedo, Gregorio Ticman	Filippine Productions		
Ang Pagbabalik	Carlos Padilla, Sr.	Armando Crisostomo, Gerardo de Leon, Angel Esmeralda, Lucita Goyena, Mona Lisa, Yolanda Marquez, Quiel Segovia, Gregorio Ticman, Mary Walter	Parlatone Hispano Filipino	Drama	
Nang Magulo ang Maynila	Cecilio Joaquin	Rosa del Rosario			
Ang Kumpisalan at ang Batas	Rod Avlas	Rosa del Rosario, Angel Esmeralda, Leopoldo Salcedo	Filippine Productions		
Umaraw sa Hatinggabi	Fermin Barva	Nela Alvarez, Leopoldo Salcedo	Filippine Productions		
Via Crucis	Eduardo de Castro	Leopoldo Salcedo, Rita Rica, Nela Alvarez, Lilia Vizconde, Pacita del Rio, Ana Serrano, Sonia Bella, Rosa Aguirre, Juanita Angeles, Pedro Faustino	Filippine Productions	Drama	first film of Rosa Aguirre
Susi ng Kalangitan	Carlos Padilla, Sr.	Josefino Cenizal, Gilda Gales, Yolanda Marquez, Armando Villa	Parlatone Hispano Filipino		
Hiram na Ligaya	Manuel Silos	Rosario Moreno, Carlos Padilla, Sr.	Parlatone Hispano Filipino		
Taong Demonyo	Tor Villano	Rosa del Rosario, Gregorio Fernandez, Domingo Principe, Rita Rica, Leopoldo Salcedo, Pedro Faustino, Narding Anzures	Filippine Productions	Action, Drama	first movie of Narding Anzures
Lihim ng Ina		Leopoldo Salcedo	Filippine Productions		
Bakas ng Kalansay		Fernando Poe, Sr., Mari Velez		Horror	
Anak ng Kadiliman	Mar I. Esmeralda	Tito Arevalo, Tita Duran, Angel Esmeralda, Alfredo Javier, Nati Rubi, Maria Clara Ruiz, Purita Sta. Maria	Parlatone Hispano Filipino	Drama, Horror	
Anak ng Pari		Corazon Noble, Rogelio de la Rosa		Drama	
Bituing Marikit	Carlos Vander Tolosa	Elsa Oria, Rogelio de la Rosa, Ely Ramos, Sylvia Rosales, Teddy Benavidez, Nati Rubi, Billy Vizcarra	Sampaguita Pictures	Musical	First film produced by Sampaguita Pictures, one of the "Big Four" Filipino production company during the Golden Age of Philippine Cinema 1920s - 1980s
Milagro ng Nazareno sa Quiapo	Carlos Vander Tolosa	Yolanda Marquez, Angel Esmeralda, Teddy Benavidez, Tita Duran, Federico Query, Casimiro Padilla, Nati Rubi, Joaquin Gavino	Parlatone Hispano Filipino		
Teniente Rosario	Octavio Silos	Lucita Goyena, Rogelio de la Rosa, Andres Centenera, Sylvia Rosales, Precioso Palma, Teddy Benavidez, Roberto Rosales	Parlatone Hispano Filipino		
Sanga-sangang Dila	Fermin Barva	Nela Alvarez, Ben Rubio, Maria Clara Ruiz		Drama	
1938
Ang Magmamani	Carlos Padilla, Sr.	Rogelio de la Rosa, Tita Duran, Mona Lisa, Rosita Rivera, Ben Rubio, Maria Clara Ruiz, Tessie Santos, Gregorio Ticman	Parlatone Hispano Filipino		
Pusong Wasak	Manuel Silos	Corazon Noble, Jose Inigo, Tita Duran	Filippine Productions	Romance	
Inang Mahal		Soledad Aquino, Teddy Benavidez, Tita Duran, Ramon Escudero, Carmen Martinez, Rosario Moreno	Sampaguita Pictures	Drama	
Bahay Kubo	Gerardo de Leon	Josefino Cenizal, Mona Lisa, Fely Vallejo	Parlatone Hispano Filipino	Musical	
Bukang Liwayway		Armando Crisostomo, Rogelio de la Rosa, Gerardo de Leon, Mona Lisa, Ben Rubio, Maria Clara Ruiz, Gregorio Ticman	Parlatone Hispano Filipino		
Makiling	Gerardo de Leon	Armando Crisostomo, Rogelio de la Rosa, Gerardo de Leon, Mona Lisa, Gregorio Ticman	Parlatone Hispano Filipino		
Mga Sugat ng Puso	Gerardo de Leon	Armando Crisostomo, Rogelio de la Rosa, Gerardo de Leon, Mona Lisa, Ben Rubio, Maria Clara Ruiz, Gregorio Ticman	Parlatone Hispano Filipino	Romance	
Sanggumay	Mar I. Esmeralda	Angel Esmeralda, Yolanda Marquez, Purita Sta. Maria	Parlatone Hispano Filipino		
Alipin ng Palad	Octavio Silos	Miguel Anzures, Soledad Aquino, Andres Centenera, Rudy Concepcion, Tita Duran, Rosario Moreno, Nati Rubi	Sampaguita Pictures	Drama	
Mariang Alimango		Mila del Sol, Tita Duran, Amanding Montes	X'Otic Films		
Paruparong Bukid	Octavio Silos	Elsa Oria, Rudy Concepcion, Teddy Benavidez, Nati Rubi, Soledad Aquino, Jose Gonzales	Sampaguita Pictures	Drama	
Dasalang Perlas	Mar I. Esmeralda	Tito Arevalo, Gerardo de Leon, Angel Esmeralda, Mona Lisa, Estela Mari, Patsy, Purita Sta. Maria	Parlatone Hispano Filipino		
Carmelita	Mar I. Esmeralda	Florentino Ballecer, Conrado Conde, Reynaldo Dante, Amelita Sol, Tolindoy	Parlatone Hispano Filipino		
Lakambini	Tor Villano	Dely Atay-atayan, Andoy Balun-balunan, Ricardo Brillantes, Armando Rosal, Purita Sta. Maria	Cervatina Filipina	Drama, Romance	
Binatang Bukid	Mar I. Esmeralda	Corazon Noble, Gerardo de Leon, Angel Esmeralda, Estela Mari, Purita Sta. Maria, Gregorio Ticman	Parlatone Hispano Filipino	Drama, Musical, Romance	
Dalagang Silangan	Tor Villano	Florentino Ballecer, Manuel Barbeyto, Rosa del Rosario, Pedro Faustino, Leopoldo Salcedo	Filippine Productions	Drama	
Arimunding-munding	Tor Villano	Florentino Ballecer, Manuel Barbeyto, Pacita del Rio, Jose Padilla, Jr., Carlos Padilla, Sr., Pugo, Carmen Rosales, Gregorio Ticman, Togo	Excelsior Films	Drama	
Pugad ng Agila		Armando Crisostomo, Don Dano, Lucita Goyena	Parlatone Hispano Filipino		the melody of the theme song of this war film was used to become a popular Filipino Christmas song, "Ang Pasko Ay Sumapit". The theme song of this film was originally composed by actor Josefino Cenizal.
Ligaw na Bituin	Tor Villano	Norma del Rosario, Cecilio Joaquin, Leopoldo Salcedo	Filippine Productions		
Ako'y Maghihintay	Tor Villano	Pacita del Rio, Bert LeRoy, Rolando Liwanag, Maria Miranda, Pugo, Togo	Excelsior Films	Comedy	
Dahong Lagas	Carlos Vander Tolosa	Yolanda Marquez, Ely Ramos, Andres Centenera, Nati Rubi, Miguel Anzures, Soledad Aquino, Precioso Palma, Billy Surot Viscarra, Lita Zabala	Sampaguita Pictures	Musical	
Mahiwagang Binibini (Ang Kiri)	Serafin de los Angeles	Atang de la Rama, Precioso Palma, Carmen Rosales, Nilo Barredo, Gregorio Ticman, Florentino Ballecer, Conrado Santiago	Diwata Films, Excelsior Films	Drama	first movie of Carmen Rosales
Mutya ng Katipunan		Ricardo Brillantes, Arsenia Francisco	Liwayway	Biopic	
Ruben	Mar I. Esmeralda	Armando Crisostomo, Gerardo de Leon, Angel Esmeralda, Purita Sta. Maria	Parlatone Hispano Filipino		
Ang Kamay na Bakal	Ernesto C. Lopez	Jose Padilla, Jr., Lilia Vizconde, Andres Guevara, Patria Rosal, Salvador Zaragoza, Miguel Anzures, Juanita Angeles, Guillermo Carls, Ben de Luna	Filippine Productions	Drama	
Doña Clara		Jaime Castellvi, Jose Inigo, Lilia Vizconde	Filippine Productions	Drama	
Bayan at Pag-ibig	Ramon Estella	Bayani Casimiro, Bert LeRoy, Luningning, Jose Cris Soto	Excelsior Films		
Biyaya ni Bathala		Florentino Ballecer, Rosa del Rosario, Cecilio Joaquin, Rolando Liwanag, Rita Rivera, Leopoldo Salcedo	Filippine Productions	Action	
Kalapating Puti	Guillermo J. Icasiano	Florentino Ballecer, Guillermo Carls, Rosa del Rosario, Paula Maurat, Leopoldo Salcedo	Filippine Productions	Action	
Hatol ng Mataas na Langit		Fernando Poe, Sr., Gregorio Ticman	X'Otic Films		
Walang Pangalan	Carlos Padilla, Sr.	Rudy Concepcion, Armando Crisostomo, Mona Lisa, Ben Rubio, Gregorio Ticman	Parlatone Hispano Filipino		
Ang Batang Tulisan	Rod Avlas	Miguel Anzures, Narding Anzures, Manuel Barbeyto, Pedro Faustino, Corazon Noble, Mary Walter	Binatang Parang, Filippine Productions	Drama	
Madaling Araw	Carlos Vander Tolosa	Elsa Oria, Ely Ramos, Yolanda Marquez, Teddy Benavidez, Ernesto La Guardia, Precioso Palma, Manuel Eloriaga, Nati Rubi, Billy Vizcarra, Quiel Segovia, Joaquin Gavino	Sampaguita Pictures	Musical	
Ay! Kalisud	Manuel Silos	Fely Vallejo, Jose Inigo, Miguel Anzures	Filippine Productions		
Binatang Parang	Rod Avlas				
Bulaklak ng Luha		Nela Alvarez, Miguel Anzures, Alipio Silverio, Gregorio Ticman	Philippine National Pictures	Drama	
Himagsikan ng Puso	Manuel Silos	Rosa Aguirre, Miguel Anzures, Teddy Benavidez, Rudy Concepcion, Horacio Morelos	Sampaguita Pictures	Drama, Romance	
Dahil sa Pag-ibig		Nela Alvarez, Ben Rubio	Luzon Motion Pictures	Romance	
Isang Halik Lamang	Mar I. Esmeralda	Tito Arevalo, Gerardo de Leon, Oscar del Rosario, Angel Esmeralda, Estela Mari, Edo Nagali, Purita Sta. Maria	Parlatone Hispano Filipino	Romance	
Dalagang Luksa		Armando Crisostomo, Reynaldo Dante, Maria Clara Ruiz	Parlatone Hispano Filipino		
Dugong Hinugasan	Tor Villano	Corazon Noble, Fidel de Castro, Ricardo de Soto, Pedro Faustino, Eduardo Infante	Filippine Productions	Drama	
Dolores	Consuelo P. Osorio, Salvador Osorio	Lina Alva, Armando Crisostomo, Reynaldo Dante, Rosa del Mar	Parlatone Hispano Filipino	Drama	Rosa del Mar was introduced in this movie
Ang Maya		Consuelo Salazar, Fernando Poe, Sr.	Excelsior Films		
Celia at Balagtas	Gregorio Fernandez	Reynaldo Dante, Gloria Imperial, Maria Clara Ruiz	Excelsior Films		
El Secreto de la Confesión	Don Dano	Armando Villa, Rosa María, Nita Farias, Mario de Cordova, Mari del Sol, Julio Gonzales, Eliseo Carvajal, Rosita Gariz	Parlatone Hispano Filipino	Drama	first Filipino film spoken and sung in Spanish.
Mapait na Lihim		Rosa Aguirre, Alfonso Carvajal, Rudy Concepcion, Rosario Moreno, Sylvia Rosales, Nati Rubi	Sampaguita Pictures		
1939
Walang Sugat	Enrique Herrera-Davila	Rosa del Rosario, Leopoldo Salcedo	Filippine Productions	Musical	directorial debut of Enrique Herrera-Davila
Tunay na Ina	Octavio Silos	Rosario Moreno, Rudy Concepcion, Tita Duran, Quiel Segovia, Nati Rubi, Precioso Palma, Naty Bernardo, Joaquin Gavino, Mercedes de Gavino	Excelsior Films	Drama	one of the four pre-war films that survived World War II
Sakay	Lamberto V. Avellana	Salvador Zaragoza, Leopoldo Salcedo, Joseph de Cordova, Arsenia Francisco, Ben Perez	Filippine Productions		
Ikaw ang Dahilan	Tor Villano	Leopoldo Salcedo, Rosita Rivera, Manuel Barbeyto, Jose Luz Bernardo	Sanggumay Pictures	Drama	
Lagot na Kuwintas	Carlos Padilla, Sr.	Rosario Moreno, Rogelio de la Rosa, Sylvia Rosales, Ernesto La Guardia, Miguel Anzures, Soledad Aquino, Nati Rubi, Precioso Palma, Billy Vizcarra, Joaquin Gavino, Patring Gomez	Sampaguita Pictures		
Giliw Ko	Carlos Vander Tolosa	Ely Ramos, Fernando Poe, Mila del Sol, Mona Lisa, Ben Rubio, Precioso Palma, Cecilio Joaquin	Carlos Vander Tolosa Production, LVN Pictures	Musical, Romance	the first film produced by the film studio and production company, LVN Pictures Inc.
Batas ng Salapi	Cecilio Joaquin	Ricardo de Soto, Cecilio Joaquin, Virginia Salcedo	Oriental Pictures		
Kataksilan	Eliseo Carvajal	Alfonso Carvajal, Armando Crisostomo, Virginia Salcedo	Parlatone Hispano Filipino		
Tawag ng Bayan		Ricardo Brillantes, Arsenia Francisco	Liwayway, Manansala Films		
Walang Tahanan	Carlos Padilla, Sr.	Rosa Aguirre, Rudy Concepcion, Yolanda Marquez, Carlos Padilla, Sr., Sylvia Rosales, Armando Villa, Billy Surot Viscarra	Sampaguita Pictures		
Lihim ng Dagat-dagatan	Juan Pedro De Tavera	Lina Alva, Tito Arevalo, Armando Crisostomo, Angel Esmeralda	Parlatone Hispano Filipino		
Yaman ng Mahirap	Carmen Concha	Angel Esmeralda, Tito Arevalo, Mercedes Ponce, Antonina Hernandez, Tita Duran, Armida Siguion-Reyna	Parlatone Hispano Filipino	Drama	this is the first film acting experience in 1939 of Armida Siguion-Reyna who is only age 8 at the time
Pag-ibig ng Isang Ina	Fermin Barva	Manuel Barbeyto, Pacita del Rio, Cecilio Joaquin, Rolando Liwanag, Torcuato Reyes, Virginia Salcedo	Philippines Artist Guild	Drama	
Ruisenor	Mar I. Esmeralda	Purita Sta. Maria, Gerardo de Leon, Moneng Ilagan, Patsy, Estela Mari, Honor Ilagan, Edo Nagali, Ramon Estella	Parlatone Hispano Filipino		
Siya'y Aking Anak	Carlos Padilla, Sr.	Miguel Anzures, Jose Luz Bernardo, Naty Bernardo, Maria Miranda, Rosario Moreno, Carlos Padilla, Sr., Fernando Royo, Quiel Segovia	Sampaguita Pictures		
Punit na Bandila		Andres Centenera, Lucita Goyena, Amanding Montes, Fernando Poe, Sr., Jose Troni	X'Otic Films		
Leron Leron Sinta		Lucita Goyena, Fernando Poe, Sr.	X'Otic Films	Romance	
Mayroon nga Bang Diyos?	Guillermo J. Icasiano	Leopoldo Salcedo, Naty Bernardo, Rolando Liwanag, Cita Della, Manuel Barbeyto, Pedro Faustino	Filippine Productions	Comedy, Romance	songs featured were "Ako'y Aawit," "Kay Ligaya ng Mabuhay"
Ama at Anak	Gerardo De Leon	Tito Arevalo, Armando Crisostomo, Gerardo De Leon, Eduardo Infante, Virginia Salcedo	Parlatone Hispano Filipino		
Azucena		Arsenia Francisco, Rosario Lam, Rolando Liwanag, Pugo, Victor Sevilla, Togo, Paco Zamora	Excelsior Films		
Hanggang Langit	Ted Del Rio	Cecilio Joaquin, Fernando Poe, Sr., Ben Rubio	Manila Film Productions		
Naglahong Dambana		Rosa del Rosario, Lilian Velez			
Gabay ng Magulang		Rosa Aguirre, Rudy Concepcion, Yolanda Marquez, Sylvia Rosales, Fernando Royo	Sampaguita Pictures	Drama	
Mga Anak ng Lansangan	Tor Villano	Manuel Barbeyto, Sonia Bella, Jaime de la Rosa, Andres Guevarra, Lino Lerma, Rolando Liwanag, Gregorio Ticman	Eastern Pictures	Drama	
Bertolo Balodoy			Americo-Filipino	Action	First film of the southern Philippines and outside Luzon, first Visayan film shot in Cebu and Iloilo.
Ay! Monang	Manuel Silos	Manuel Silos, Monang Carvajal	Sampaguita Pictures	Biopic	
Matamis na Kasinungalingan		Pacita del Rio, Leopoldo Salcedo	Filippine Productions		
Kuwintas na Ginto	Tor Villano	Arsenia Francisco, Ernesto La Guardia, Pugo, Nati Rubi, Togo, Paco Zamora	Excelsior Films	Comedy	
Ang Kaban ng Tipan		Andres Centenera, Reynaldo Dante, Lucita Goyena, Luningning, Amanding Montes	X'Otic Films	Drama, Romance	
Mabangong Bulaklak		Jose Luz Bernardo, Rosa del Mar, Cecilio Joaquin, Elsa Oria, Fernando Poe, Sr., Leopoldo Salcedo	LVN Pictures	Romance	
Langit sa Karimlan		Reynaldo Dante, Gerardo de Leon, Angel Esmeralda, Virginia Salcedo	Parlatone Hispano Filipino	Romance	
Biyak na Bato	Fausto J. Galauran	Fernando Poe, Sr., Lucita Goyena, Serafin Garcia, Luningning, Precioso Palma, Cecilio Joaquin, Rolando Liwanag, Martina Jimenez, Juanito Lazaga, Matty Torres, Pedro Martinez, Andres Centenera, Serafin Garcia, Ben Rubio	X'Otic Films	Action	
Anak ng Hinagpis	Manuel Silos	Katy de la Cruz, Etang Discher, Tita Duran, Pedro Faustino, Corazon Noble, Leopoldo Salcedo	Filippine Productions	Drama	
Ang Magsasampaguita		Rosa Aguirre, Miguel Anzures, Narding Anzures, Tita Duran, Carmen Martinez, Corazon Noble, Dina Valle	Sampaguita Pictures		
Dalisay	Manuel Silos	Rogelio de la Rosa, Ernesto La Guardia, Corazon Noble, Nati Rubi, Quiel Segovia, Fely Vallejo	Sampaguita Pictures	Drama, Musical, Romance	first Filipino film in which premier was attended by the current serving Philippine president. President Manuel L. Quezon and his family watched the film
Nagkaisang Landas	Carmen Concha	Rogelio dela Rosa, Lydia Leynes, Reynaldo Dante, Carman Bernabe, Mercedes Ponce, Conchita Veles, Edo Baagali	Parlatone Hispano Filipino	Drama	
Pasang Krus	Octavio Silos	Corazon Noble, Rogelio dela Rosa, Rosa Aguirre, Justina David, Carmen Martinez, Nati Rubi, Billy Surot Viscarra, Salvador Tinsay, Francisco Monroy	Sampaguita Pictures	Drama	
Takip Silim	Don Dano	Carmen Rosales, Rogelio dela Rosa, Rosa Aguirre, Lota Delgado, Miguel Anzures, Gregorio Fernandez, Precioso Palma, Jose Luna	Sampaguita Pictures	Drama, Musical	
Tatlong Pagkabirhen	Gregorio Fernandez	Andres Centenera, Reynaldo Dante, Tita Duran, Lucita Goyena	X'Otic Films	Drama	
