= Emma Alegre =

Filipino actress (1934–2016)

- Born: Bernardita Avdicula; 1934
- Died: 2016 (aged 81–82)
- Years active: 1954–1957

Emma Alegre (1934–2016) was a Filipina actress, who worked from 1954 to 1957, mostly for LVN Pictures. She first appeared in Dalaginding. Her third movie was Damong Ligaw, where she was billed second (behind Tessie Quintana). In her fourth movie, Dambanang Putik, she played the friend of Delia Razon.

== Life and career ==
Alegre developed her acting career as a drama queen with an "aloof personality". In 1955, she starred opposite Rogelio de la Rosa in the acclaimed drama Higit sa Lahat. For her performance, she was one of five nominees for the FAMAS Best Actress award that year, but lost to Rosa Rosal. That year, she also starred in "Pilipino Kostum: No Touch" with Mario Montenegro, a rom-com directed by Manuel Conde that analyzed American and Hispanic values. In 1956, she paired up again with De la Rosa in the film Idolo, and also starred in Everlasting with Montenegro. In 1957, she starred in the Gregorio Fernandez-directed film Hukom Roldan as the wife of Jaime de la Rosa's character. Later that decade, she quit acting, got married and moved to the US.

She had a son, Alvin Lim, who had a restaurant, Café Bola. After she stopped acting, she kept in touch with other actresses from LVN Pictures by organizing reunions.

Alegre died in 2016.

== Filmography ==
- Dalaginding (1954)
- Tin-Edyer (a.k.a. Teenager) (1954)
- Damong Ligaw (1954)
- Dambanang Putik (a.k.a. Muddy Altar) (1954)
- Hiram na Kasintahan (a.k.a. Borrowed Lover) (1954)
- Tagapagmana (a.k.a. Inheritance) (1955)
- Palasyong Pawid (a.k.a. Wood Palace) (1955)
- Higit sa Lahat (a.k.a. Most of All) (1955)
- 1 2 3 (1955)
- Pasikat (1955)
- Karnabal (a.k.a. Carnival) (1955)
- Pilipino Kostum No Touch (a.k.a. Filipino Custom No Touch) (1955)
- Chaperon (1956)
- Everlasting (1956)
- Idolo (a.k.a. Idol) (1956)
- Medalyong Perlas (a.k.a. Pearl Medal) (1956)
- Dalawang Ina (a.k.a. Two Mothers) (1957)
- Hukom Roldan (a.k.a. Judge Roldan) (1957)
- Basta Ikaw (a.k.a. If it's You, OK) (1957)
- Tingnan Natin (a.k.a. Let me See) (1957)
