= Tiniente Rosario =

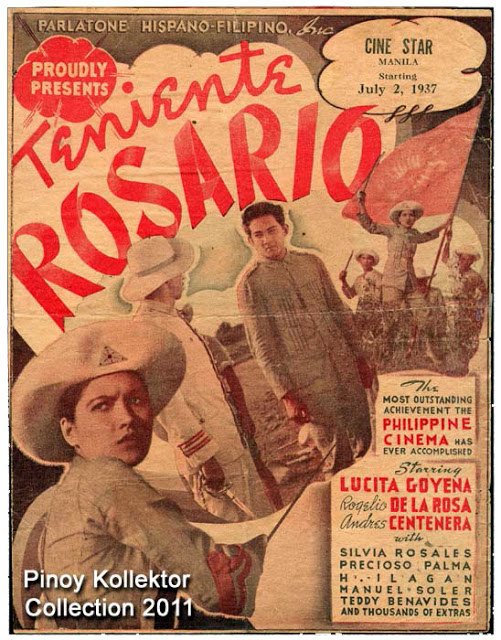
- The movie flyer for the Film featuring Lucita Goyena and Rogelio de la Rosa and its screening date and location.
- Directed by: Octavio Silos
- Written by: Gregorio Coching
- Based on: Philippine Revolution of 1898
- Starring: Lucita Goyena; Rogelio de la Rosa; Andres Centenera; Sylvia Rosales; Precioso Palma; Teodoro "Teddy" Benavidez
- Music by: Juan Silos Jr; Jose Silos
- Distributed by: Parlatone Hispano-Filipino Inc.
- Release dates: June 17, 1937 (Fox and Savoy Theater)
- Running time: Unknown
- Country: Philippines
- Language: Unknown

Tiniente Rosario (lit. 'Lieutenant Rosario') is a 1937 black and white Filipino war film featuring Lucita Goyena.

== Synopsis ==
The film follows the story of a female revolutionary leader who led a thousand-strong force of Katipunero men in a struggle for independence in 1896, along with her unwavering love for one of her men.

== Cast ==
- Lucita Goyena
- Rogelio de la Rosa
- Andres Centenera
- Sylvia Rosales
- Precioso Palma
- Teodoro "Teddy" Benavidez

== Production ==
The film was released on June 17, 1937, at Fox & Savoy theater, and according to the movie flyers, Tiniente Rosario and was a high-budget film notable for its multi-camera shots and casting of a "thousand extras" who play the Filipino and Spanish Forces.

=== Lost status ===
Like the other pre-war films of the Philippine cinema, Tiniente Rosario is considered to be a lost film. The original reels or prints are believed to have been lost during the Battle of Manila in 1945. A few posters and leaflets survive as visual records of the film.

== See also ==
- Cinema of the Philippines
- Philippine revolution
