= Mariano Garchitorena =

Filipino politician

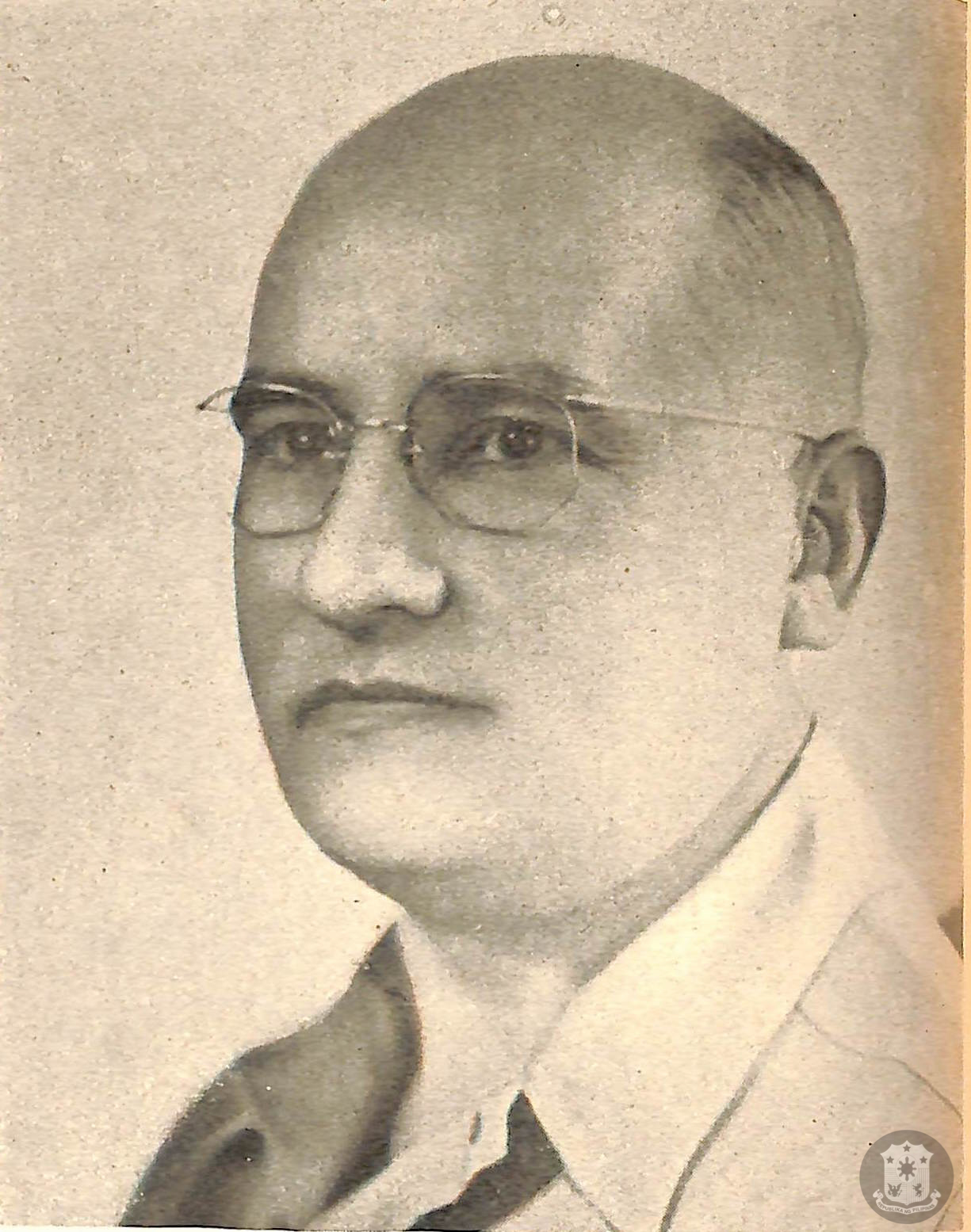
- Photograph from the Blue Book: First Anniversary of the Republic of the Philippines, published 1947

Secretary of Agriculture and Natural Resources Secretary of Agriculture and Commerce (1946–1947)
- In office May 28, 1946 – September 1, 1948
- President: Manuel Roxas; Elpidio Quirino
- Preceded by: Vicente Singson Encarnacion
- Succeeded by: Placido Mapa

Governor of Camarines Sur
- In office 1945–1946
- Preceded by: Mariano Villafuerte
- Succeeded by: Gabriel Prieto

Personal details
- Born: Mariano Garchitorena y Chereau; February 12, 1898 Hong Kong
- Died: October 1, 1961 (aged 63) Manila, Philippines
- Party: Liberal
- Spouse: Caridad Pamintuan
- Parent(s): Andres Garchitorena; Margarite Chereau

Mariano Garchitorena y Chereau (February 12, 1898 – October 1, 1961) was a Filipino politician of Spanish-French descent.

Garchitorena was the son of Don Andres Garchitorena and a French lady, Margarite Chereau. He was married to Dona Caridad Pamintuan. He was the cousin of guerrilla Major Don Tomas T. Garchitorena and the brother of the actor Salvador A. Garchitorena, grandfather of Anjo Yllana and Jomari Yllana, and Flor Garchitorena, grandmother of actor Jaime Garchitorena. He was the uncle of Sandiganbayan Justice Francis Garchitorena, actor Andres Centenera and TV and radio star in the 1960s, Andres Garchitorena.

He was briefly Governor of Camarines Sur in 1945. He was elected President of the Abacá Fiber Institute of the Philippines, then appointed by President Manuel Roxas as Secretary of Agriculture and Commerce, later run for senator one slot below of being elected, became ambassador to Spain. He retired and remained the Liberal Party Chairman in Bicolandia.
