= Francis Garchitorena =

Filipino judge

Presiding Judge of the Sandiganbayan
- In office 1986–2002
- Preceded by: Manuel Pamaran
- Succeeded by: Minita Chico-Nazario

Personal details
- Born: Francis Xavier Garchitorena; January 8, 1938 Camarines Sur, Philippines
- Died: February 25, 2005 (aged 67) Makati, Philippines
- Spouse: Victoria Pineda
- Parent(s): Buenaventura de Erquiaga Palacios; Flor Chereau Garchitorena
- Relatives: Anjo Yllana (nephew); Jomari Yllana (nephew)
- Education: Ateneo de Manila University; Ateneo de Naga University
- Known for: Presiding judge of Sandiganbayan

Francis Xavier Garchitorena (January 8, 1938 - February 25, 2005) was a Filipino Sandiganbayan Presiding Judge from 1986 to 2002.

Garchitorena studied in Ateneo de Naga University and graduated from the Law School of Ateneo de Manila University in 1962. He was one of the leading lawyers during his time. He was appointed Sandiganbayan Justice. Minita V. Chico Nazario was appointed to fill his place.

In 2001, he was embroiled in a dispute with Associate Justice Anacleto Badoy, culminating with the latter going on leave.

== Family ==
Garchitorena's biological father, Buenaventura de Erquiaga Palacios (1895-1959), was a Spanish honorary vice consul, from Ea, Biscay. Garchitorena's mother, Flor Chereau Garchitorena (1902-1981), came from Tigaon, Camarines Sur, and was of Spanish and French descent. Flor's brother was Don Mariano Garchitorena, governor of Camarines Sur, secretary of Agriculture and commerce, and Minister to Spain.

Garchitorena was the grandson by paternal line of Felipe Santiago de Erquiaga de Odiaga (1859-?) and María Jesús Palacios Goitia (1858-?), and by maternal line of Don Andrés Garchitorena, a revolutionary mason and member of Aguinaldo's Hong Kong Junta, and of Marguerite Chereau, who was French.

== Illness and death ==
On January 17, 2005, Garchitorena was diagnosed with brain tumor. He died at the Makati Medical Center in Makati on February 25, 2005.
