= Luksang Tagumpay =

1956 drama film by Gregorio Fernandez

- Directed by: Gregorio Fernandez
- Written by: Mike Velarde; T.E. Sauco
- Produced by: Gregorio Fernandez
- Starring: Jaime de la Rosa; Delia Razon; Rebecca Del Rio; Eddie Rodriguez; Rudy Fernandez
- Cinematography: Remegio Young
- Edited by: Ike Jarlego Sr.
- Music by: Francisco Buencamino Jr.
- Production company: LVN Pictures
- Release date: 8 June 1956
- Running time: 118 minutes
- Country: Philippines
- Language: Tagalog / Filipino

Luksang Tagumpay is a 1956 Filipino drama film by Gregorio Fernandez starring Jaime de la Rosa, Delia Razon and Rudy Fernandez. The movie won Best Picture in FAMAS Awards 1957. First screen appearance of the young Rudy Fernandez. Director Gregorio Fernandez hired his then three-year-old son to appear in the film.

== Plot ==
After years of waiting for the absent husband who had been reported missing in the Korean front, Anita (Delia Razon) finally resigns to early widowhood and accepts the insistent pleas of a kind, loving, and handsome Dr. Ricardo Llamas (Jaime de la Rosa). Marriage brings them happiness but fate has other plans for them.
