= La Mariposa Negra =

1920 film

La Mariposa Negra' is 1920 Filipino silent film directed by José Nepomuceno and starring Juanita Ángeles and Andres Fernandez.
