= Rosa del Rosario =

Filipino actress (1917–2006)

- Del Rosario in 1935
- Born: Rose Stagner y Rosario; December 15, 1917; Bacolor, Pampanga, Philippine Islands, U.S.
- Died: February 4, 2006 (aged 88); Novato, California, U.S.
- Occupation: Actress
- Years active: 1932–1954

Rosa del Rosario (born Rose Stagner; December 15, 1917 – February 4, 2006) was a Filipino actress whose career spanned two decades. She began her career as a teenager and became one of the biggest box-office draws of the 1930s to early 1940s, appearing in films with political and social themes depicting Filipino patriotism and liberalism. After appearing in two Hollywood productions during World War II, she returned to the Philippines and starred in the romantic action Bakya Mo Neneng (1947) opposite Leopoldo Salcedo. She then became the highest paid actress of that period following its success and was the first actress to play the Filipino comic book character Darna (1951) in live action.

== Early life and education ==
Rose Stagner was born on December 15, 1917 to parents Aquilina del Rosario and American father Frank Stagner, who was a US Army lieutenant. Del Rosario transfer to Manila and she began studying at the age of seven and was enrolled in public schools. She attended Isabelo de los Reyes Elementary School until seventh grade. For her secondary education, she studied at the Manila High School until sophomore year. She was an average student, although her grades fluctuated.

She did odd jobs at bakeshops and sold cookies, siomai and empanada at the movie theaters, which enabled her to watch movie for free.

== Career ==
=== Early years ===
At age twelve, del Rosario was discovered by Mrs. Isabel Acuña-Nepomuceno, the wife of filmmaker Jose Nepomuceno, who cast her for a minor role in the silent horror film Satanas (1932). She was formally introduced in Ligaw na Bulaklak where she was paired with Rogelio de la Rosa. Following its success, Nepomuceno directed and produced its sequel Lantang Bulaklak later that year. Rosales starred in her first sound film Doktor Kuba in 1934.

In 1937, del Rosario was cast in Eduardo de Castro's Zamboanga opposite Fernando Poe Sr. The film was first screened in the United States and was cited at the Academy Awards the following year. In 1941, del Rosario starred in Gerardo de Leon's Ang Maestra opposite Rogelio de la Rosa, who also produced the film under his film outfit RDR Productions. The film was Eddie Romero's first film as a scriptwriter and was the inaugural film of Life Theater in Quiapo.

Del Rosario returned to the Philippines after the war and starred opposite Leopoldo Salcedo in Ang Bakya Mo, Neneng, where she was paid ₱35,000, becoming the highest paid movie star at that point.

== Personal life ==
Following her retirement to acting, del Rosario moved back to California in 1952. where she married John Samit. They both first met in Manila where Samit worked in the U.S. Embassy. Together they had two daughters, Geraldine Marie and Teresa. Samit and del Rosario later divorced in 1975 and spent most of her life as a cosmetologist in San Francisco.

== Legacy ==
Rosales has often been cited as the original "Queen of Philippine Movies." She was named Actress of the Year in 1940 for her roles in Buena Vista and Huling Habilin.

In 1982, del Rosario have been awarded with the Walang Kupas Award from the Doña Josefa Edralin-Marcos Foundation and At Iba Pa group. During the event, Lino Brocka named her the "idol of my youth." In 2007, the Mowelfund have also awarded her with an Ani Award for her contributions to Philippine film industry.

== Filmography ==
- Satanas (1932)
- Ligaw na Bulaklak (1932)
- Tianak (1932)
- Lantang Bulaklak (1932)
- Doctor Kuba (1933)
- Ang Mga Ulila (1933)
- Mag-inang Mahirap (1934)
- Anting-Anting (1934)
- X3X (1934)
- Anak ng Bilanggo (1934)
- Sa Tawag ng Diyos (1934)
- Ang Gulong ng Buhay (1935)
- Anak ng Birhen (1935)
- Awit ng Pag-ibig (1935)
- Sumpa ng Aswang (1935)
- Buhok ni Ester (1936)
- Ama (1936)
- Ang Birheng Walang Dambana (1936)
- Gamu-Gamong Naging Lawin (1937)
- Nang Magulo ang Maynila (1937)
- Ang Kumpisalan at ang Batas (1937)
- Taong Demonyo (1937)
- Asahar at Kabaong (1937)
- Zamboanga (1937)
- Ligaw na Bituin (1938)
- Kalapating Puti (1938)
- Dalagang Silangan (1938)
- Biyaya ni Bathala (1938)
- Walang Sugat (1939)
- Naglahong Dambana (1939)
- Cadena de Amor (1940)
- Buenavista (1940)
- Paraiso (1941)
- Ilang-Ilang (1941)
- Ang Maestra (1941)
- Huling Habilin (1942)
- Border Bandits (1946)
- Anna and the King of Siam (1946)
- Bakya mo Neneng (1947)
- Si Malakas at si Maganda (1947)
- Bagong Sinderella (1947)
- Caprichosa (1947)
- Ang Himala ng Birhen sa Antipolo (1947)
- Hagibis (1947)
- Hacendera (1947)
- Tandang Sora (1947)
- Bulaklak at Paruparo (1948)
- Anak ng Panday (1949)
- Kumander Sundang (1949)
- Bulaklak ng Digmaan (1950)
- Aklat ng Pag-ibig (1950)
- Kundiman ng Luha (1950)
- American Guerilla in the Philippines (1950)
- Mag-inang Ulila (1951)
- Rosario Cantada (1951)
- Darna (1951)
- Singsing na Sinulid (1951)
- Darna at ang Babaing Lawin (1952)
- Neneng Ko (1952)
- May Karapatang Isilang (1953)
- May Bakas ang Lumipas (1954)

== Death ==
Del Rosario died of pancreatic cancer on February 4, 2006, in Novato, California, at the age of 88.
