= Diwata ng Karagatan =

1936 Filipino film directed by Carlos Vander Tolosa

- Directed by: Carlos Vander Tolosa
- Produced by: José Nepomuceno
- Starring: Mari Velez; Rogelio de la Rosa
- Production company: Parlatone Hispano Filipino
- Release date: 1936
- Country: Philippines
- Language: Tagalog

Diwata ng Karagatan (lit. 'Spirit of the Ocean') is a 1936 Philippine romance film directed by Carlos Vander Tolosa and produced by Parlatone Hispano-Filipino, a studio owned by José Nepomuceno.

== Cast ==
- Mari Velez as Ligaya
- Rogelio de la Rosa as Jose

Other cast members remain unidentified, including the actor which played the antagonistic role of Wong.

== Production ==
Diwata ng Karagatan was directed by Carlos Vander Tolosa and produced by José Nepomuceno under his film studio, the Parlatone Hispano-Filipino.

== Release ==
Following its premiere in 1936, Diwata ng Karagatan was released again for a three-day exhibition at the Fox Theater (later known as the Dalisay Theater) in Manila. It was then exported to France, Belgium and South America, where it was dubbed in French and released under alternate titles such as Ligaya, fille de iles (lit. 'Ligaya, Girl of the Island') and Wong Le Tyrant (lit. 'Wong the Tyrant'). The film was reportedly the first Filipino film to be shown in Europe and South America.

== Loss and rediscovery ==
During World War II, all known copies of Diwata ng Karagatan were presumed to be lost. However, in 2025, film historian Nick Deocampo discovered a 35 mm print of Ligaya, fille de iles at Cinematek in Belgium, making the film as the oldest surviving Filipino pre-war film. The copy showed evidence of piracy and alteration, as it was edited by a French distributor to be shorter than the original, had rearranged scenes, and featured French narration and credits that replaced the film's original credits.

As per the retrieved copy, the film was claimed to be a "documentary of exotic South-sea natives" and follows the same romantic themes with the 1937 film Zamboanga.
