= Manuel Barbeyto =

Filipino actor

- Born: March 20, 1902; Tondo, Manila City, Metro Manila, Luzon, Philippine Islands
- Died: October 26, 1979 (aged 77); City of Manila, Metro Manila, Luzon, Philippines
- Other names: Manolo, Manoling, Manny
- Occupation: Actor
- Years active: 1921–1955

Manuel Barbeyto (March 20, 1902 – October 26, 1979) was a Filipino actor of early 1920s before the war struck in the City of Manila. Barbeyto made his first appearance in the silent movie Mary, I Love You in 1921. He is known to play villainous roles.

== Background ==
Barbeyto was born on March 20, 1902, in Tondo, Manila City, where he was raised by his parents, Inocencio Barbeyto and Catalina Costosa. He made two movies under Filippine Pictures, Ang Batang Tulisan with Mary Walter and Dalagang Silangan. He was one of the youngsters in 1939 movie Mga Anak ng Lansangan (Sons of the Street), Santa (Saint) under Majestic Pictures and his last movie before the war Mahal Pa Rin Kita (I Still Love You). Barbeyto returned doing mature roles in 1946 in the movies Tayug, Ang Batang Api, Siyudad sa Ilalim ng Lupa (City under the Ground), Walang Kamatayan (Immortal), Limang Misteryo (Seven Mysteries), and many more.

Married to Florentina Feliciano

Children:

Faustino > Pos

Catalina > Lina

Antonio > Tony

Inocencio > Ising

Esperanza > Espeng, Peggy

Teresa > Tessie, Tere

Corazon > Cora, Connie

Gerardo > Gerry, Dandeng

== Filmography ==
- Mary I Love You - 1926
- Mga Dugo sa Kapirasong Lupa - 1930
- Lantang Bulaklak - 1932
- Krus na Bato - 1934
- Buhok ni Ester - 1936
- Ilaw ng Langit - 1937
- Ang Batang Tulisan - 1938
- Dalagang Silangan - 1938
- Arimunding-Arimunding - 1939
- Ikaw ang Dahilan - 1939
- Mga Anak ng Lansangan - 1939
- Pag-ibig ng Isang Ina - 1939
- Mahal Pa Rin Kita - 1940
- Santa - 1940
- Walang Kamatayan - 1946
- Tayug (Ang Bayang Api) - 1947
- Kumakaway ka Pa Irog - 1949
- Siyudad sa Ilalim ng Lupa - 1949
- Pedro, Pablo, Juan at Jose 1950
- Lihim ni Bathala - 1951
- Limang Misteryo - 1954
- Sapagka't Mahal Kita - 1955
