= Delia Razon =

Filipina actress (1930–2025)

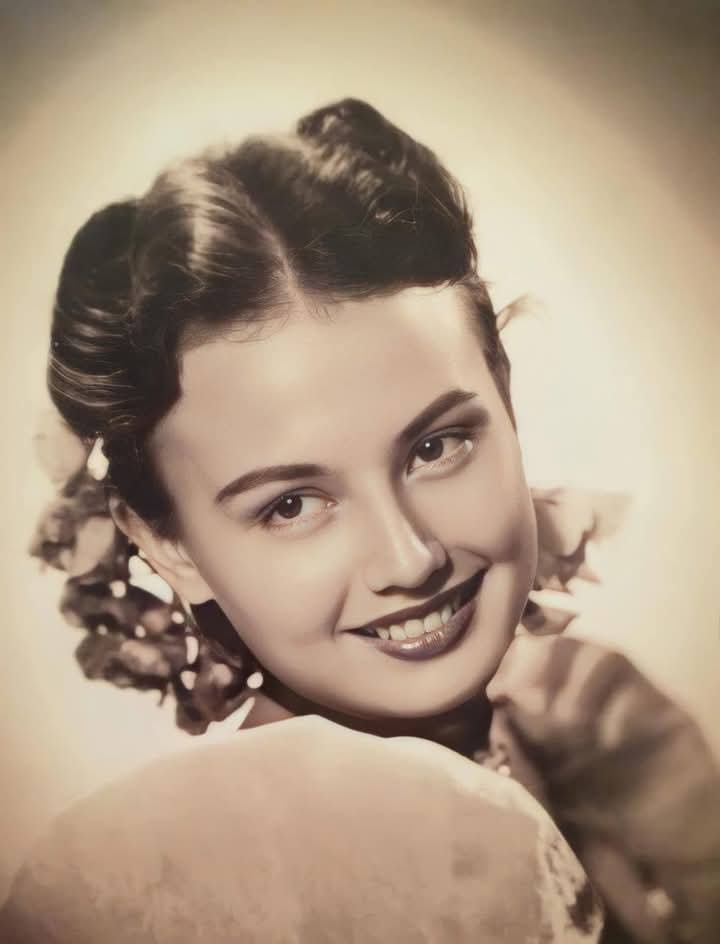
- Razon in 1963
- Born: Lucy May Dulin Grytz; August 8, 1930; Iloilo City, Philippine Islands
- Died: March 15, 2025 (aged 94); Metro Manila, Philippines
- Occupation: Actress
- Years active: 1948–1958; 1982–2010
- Spouse: Aurelio Reyes (m. 1957)
- Children: 3
- Relatives: Carla Abellana (granddaughter)

Delia Razon (born Lucy May Dulin Grytz; August 8, 1930 – March 15, 2025) was a Filipino actress born to a German father and a Spanish Filipina mother, who made her debut in 1949 in the LVN Pictures' Krus na Bituin. Doña Narcisa de Leon discovered Lucy's talent and gave her the screen name Delia Razon. She became popular for her loveteam with Rogelio dela Rosa. She married Aurelio Reyes, whose daughter Rea Reyes married Rey "PJ" Abellana, a 1980s movie heartthrob. Carla Abellana is Razon's granddaughter. She died in Metro Manila, Philippines on March 15, 2025, at the age of 94.

== Filmography ==
=== Film ===
- Awit ng Bulag (1948)
- Gitano (1949)
- Mutya ng Pasig (1950)
- Florante at Laura (1950) – Flerida
- Prinsipe Amante (1950) – Prinsesa Elena
- Prinsipe Amante sa Rubitanya (1951) – Prinsesa Elena
- Rodrigo de Villa (1952)
- Digmaan ng Damdamin (1952)
- Señorito (1953)
- Prinsipe Teñoso – Prinsesa Florcefida
- Dambanang Putik (1954)
- Lapu-Lapu (1955)
- Luksang Tagumpay (1956) – Anita
- Gaano Kadalas ang Minsan? (1982) – Obstetrician
- Haplos (1982)
- Sigaw ng Katarungan (1984)
- Kailan Sasabihing Mahal Kita (1985) - Meding Ortiz
- Tu-Yay and His Magic Payong (1986)
- Ibigay Mo sa Akin ang Bukas (1987)
- Kapag Puno Na ang Salop (1987)
- Ang Supremo (1988)
- Pik Pak Boom (segment "Manyika", 1988) – Fairy queen
- Joey Boy Munti, 15 Anyos Ka sa Muntinlupa (1991)
- Pakasalan Mo Ako (1991) – Dodie's mother
- Ipagpatawad Mo (1991) – Isolde
- Contreras Gang (1991) – Ricky's mother
- Takbo... Talon... Tili!!! (segment "Mahiwagang Banga", 1992)
- Patapon (1993)
- Galvez: Hanggang sa Dulo ng Mundo Hahanapin Kita (1993)
- Mano-Mano (1995)
- Hagedorn (1996)
- I Do? I Die! (D'yos Ko Day!) (1997) – Helena's mother
- Ika-13 Kapitulo (2000)
- Buenavista (Ang Kasaysayan ng Lucena) (2010)

=== Television ===
- Agila (1987)
- Biglang Sibol, Bayang Impasibol (2001)
- Magpakailanman (2 episodes, 2003–2004)
- Tayong Dalawa (2009)
