= Eduardo de Castro (actor) =

Filipino-American actor and filmmaker

- Born: Marvin Edward Gardner; July 7, 1907; Manila, Philippine Islands
- Died: November 17, 1955 (aged 48); Baguio, Philippines
- Occupations: Actor, director
- Years active: 1930s
- Notable work: Zamboanga (1937)

Marvin Edward Gardner (July 7, 1907 – November 17, 1955), professionally known as Eduardo de Castro, was a Filipino actor and filmmaker of American descent.

== Early life ==
Eduardo de Castro was born Marvin Edward Gardner in Sampaloc, Manila on July 7, 1907 to William Henry Gardner, a police officer in Manila and to Ceferina De Castro. His father was an American soldier who fought in the Philippine–American War who decided to settle in the islands after the conflict and worked as police officer in 1901. Marvin's parents had six children, two whom died at infancy with two boys and two girls being the remaining children. In the 1920s, de Castro worked as a seafarer who worked in a freighter which sails to the United States before starting his acting career in the 1930s.

== Career ==
De Castro is known for directing the 1937 film Zamboanga, which is among the first studio-type film production in the Philippines.

He was also a noted actor during the Philippines' silent film era. Among the films he starred was The Moro Pirate by Malayan Movies, the Brides of Sulu (1937) by Universal Pictures, and Andres Bonifacio by Manila Talkatone.

== Later years and death ==
De Castro fought as a guerilla against the Imperial Japanese forces during World War II. He became a prisoner of war and was interned by the Japanese at Fort Santiago. When he was released, he was in poor health.

His last directorial film was Mutya ng Paaralan in 1954. He died on November 17, 1955, at the Baguio General Hospital after suffering from a stroke while resting in his residence in Baguio. At the time, he was unemployed and working on a script for a new film, entitled Maskara.

== Personal life ==
De Castro was of American descent through his father. He was married to actress Rita Rica, whose real name was Florence Little, with whom he had two sons. He also had a son with Mona Lisa, another Filipino actress. His other son was the late actor, Dick Israel.
