= Mary Walter =

Filipino actress (1912–1993)

Mary Walter Grimalt
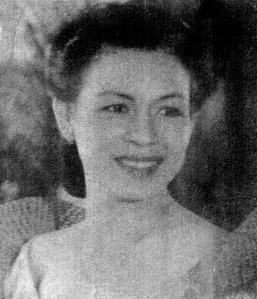
- Walter in 1949
- Born: Mary Diche Walter; September 10, 1912; Bacon, Sorsogon, Philippine Islands
- Died: February 25, 1993 (aged 80); Quezon City, Philippines
- Resting place: Himlayang Pilipino, Tandang Sora, Quezon City, Philippines
- Occupation: Filipino actress
- Years active: 1927–1948; 1959–1993
- Spouse: Alfonso Grimalt
- Children: 3
- Awards: FAMAS Lifetime Achievement Award; 1980; Gawad Urian Lifetime Achievement Award; 1992

Mary Diche Walter Grimalt (September 10, 1912 – February 25, 1993) was a Filipino actress whose eight decade-long film acting career saw her transformation from a romantic lead in the silent film era into a wizened fixture in horror movies in the late 1980s and early 1990s. For her body of work accomplished in an especially long career, she was honored with the Lifetime Achievement Award from both the Filipino Academy of Movie Arts and Sciences and the Gawad Urian.

== Biography ==
Walter was born on September 10, 1912 to a German father in what is now Sorsogon City, Sorsogon. As a teen, Walter appeared on the Manila bodabil circuit as a chorus girl in the stage shows of Katy de la Cruz. She began her film career as a bit player. Walter first came into fame in 1928, when she starred in Ang Lumang Simbahan, staged from the popular novel by Florentino Collantes. Her leading man in that film was Gregorio Fernandez, with whom she would be romantically paired in a succession of silent films, constituting perhaps the first "love-team" in Filipino cinema.

After appearing in many silent films, Walter easily made the transition when sound film emerged in the Philippines in the mid-1930s. In 1939, she appeared in the film Mariposang Berde with then up and coming actress Malou "Chumams" Nocedo. She was among the stars who appeared in the 1942 LVN film Prinsipe Teñoso, the only film produced by a Filipino film studio during the Japanese Occupation.

In 1948, after a 21-year film career, Walter retired to her hometown in Sorsogon. Ten years later, she was induced to act again, and she appeared in LVN's Kastilaloy. She was cast as a matron or mother in her forties. As she further aged, Walter became one of the most identifiable character actresses in Philippine cinema. Fair, petite and gaunt, she became inalienably identified in grandmother roles. A chain-smoker, her gravelly voice made her ideally cast in villainous roles, most prominently in the 1974 Lino Brocka film Tatlo, Dalawa, Isa. By the 1980s, she was a memorable presence in popular horror films such as Shake, Rattle and Roll (1984) and Tiyanak (1988).

In 1980, Walter received the FAMAS Lifetime Achievement Award. A similar award, this time from the Gawad Urian, was given to Walter in 1992.

Contrary to what is published in her IMDb biography, Walter was not the actress engaged in the first kissing scene in Philippine cinema (that distinction belongs to Dimples Cooper). Walter never retired again after returning to film in 1958.

== Death ==
Walter died on February 25, 1993, after having a stroke in Quezon City, she was 80.

== In popular culture ==
- Actress Waynona Collings played her on GMA Network's war drama series Pulang Araw.
