= África de la Rosa =

Filipino actress (born 1906)

- Born: 1906
- Occupation: Actress
- Relatives: Jaime de la Rosa (brother); Rogelio de la Rosa (brother); Purita de la Rosa (sister)

África Lim de la Rosa (born 1906) was a Filipino former actress. She had Spanish and Chinese roots in her family and was the sister of Philippine cinema icons Rogelio and Jaime de la Rosa. One of her ancestors was a trusted lieutenant of Fernão de Magalhães (Ferdinand Magellan).

== Filmography ==
- 1940 – Nang Mahawi ang Ulap
- 1940 – Diwa ng Awit
- 1946 – Doon Po sa Amin
- 1946 – Ang Prinsipeng Hindi Tumatawa
- 1947 – 'Sang Kuartang Abaka
- 1947 – Ang Himala ng Birhen sa Antipolo
- 1948 – Pamana ng Tulisan
- 1950 – Siete Infantes de Lara
- 1950 – Genghis Khan
- 1950 – Apat Na Alas
- 1951 – Tres Muskiteros
- 1951 – Tatlong Patak ng Luha
- 1951 – Sigfredo
- 1951 – Romeo at Julieta
- 1951 – Reyna Elena
- 1952 – Babaeng Hampaslupa
- 1952 – Kalbaryo ni Hesus
- 1952 – Darna at ang Babaeng Lawin
- 1953 – Walang Hanggan
- 1954 – Mr. & Mrs. [People's]
- 1956 – Let Us Live a.k.a. Krus na Kawayan
- 1959 – Mekeni, Abe
- 1961 – I Believe
- 1963 – Ripleng de Rapido
