= Andrés Garchitorena =

Philippine Governor

Andrés Garchitorena was the son of Spanish businessman, Mariano de la Paz C. Garchitorena and Maria Medina. He was member of the revolutionary group headed by Emilio Aguinaldo in Hong Kong during the Spanish–American War. In 1919, he was elected Governor of Ambos Camarines Sur.

He is the father of Mariano Garchitorena, Secretary of Agriculture and Commerce, and Governor of Camarines Sur. He is also the grandfather of Andres Centenera, a famous Philippine actor.
