= Ang Tatlong Hambog =

1926 film

- Directed by: Jose Nepomuceno
- Release date: 1926
- Country: Philippines
- Language: Silent

Ang Tatlong Hambog or Tatlong Hambog (also known as The Arrogant Three or Three Beggars) is a 1926 Filipino silent romantic comedy film produced by Jose Nepomuceno during the pre-war era of Philippine cinema. It is a romantic comedy starring Isabel Rosario (Elizabeth) "Dimples" Cooper, a vaudeville actress, and Luis Tuason, a race car sportsman. The film was considered controversial because it was the first in the history of Philippine movies to show a lips-to-lips kiss onscreen.

== Cast ==
- Luis Tuason
- Dimples Cooper
