= Juanita Ángeles =

Filipina silent film actress

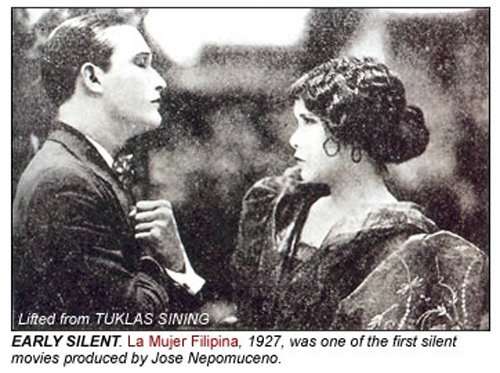
- Juanita Ángeles (right) and Gregorio Fernandez in La mujer filipina (1927)
- Born: 1900
- Died: after 1942
- Occupation: Actress
- Spouse: Severino Reyes

Juanita Ángeles (1900 - after 1942) was a Filipina silent film actress, noted as a major female silent star of early cinema of the Philippines.

Ángeles portrayed many leading roles. She was often paired with major silent film actors, including Julián Manansala, Marcelino Ilagan, Fernando Poe, Sr., and Ben Rubio.

Angeles stopped making movies before World War II struck the city of Manila. She never returned to her former life's work. She was married to Severino Reyes, until his death in 1942.

== Filmography ==
- 1923 –Hoy O Nunca Besame
- 1925 –Miracles of Love
- 1925 –The Filipino Woman
- 1929 –Ang Mutya ng Pamilihan
- 1930 –Maria Luisa
- 1932 -Ang Gayuma
- 1932 –Ang Magpapawid
- 1934 -Krus na Bato
- 1934 -Sawing Palad
- 1935 -Kalbario
- 1935 -Sumpa ng Aswang
- 1936 -Hagase tu Voluntad
- 1937 -Nang Magulo ang Maynila
- 1938 -Biyaya ni Bathala
- 1939 -Ang Magsasampaguita
- 1940 -Prinsesa ng Kumintang
- 1940 -Lambingan
- 1941 -Sa Iyong Kandungan
