= Rudy Concepción =

Filipino actor

Rudy Concepcion
- Born: Rodolfo Joaquín Concepción; 1912; Quiapo, Manila, The Philippine Islands
- Died: June 21, 1940 (aged 27–28); Philippines
- Occupations: Filipino actor
- Years active: 1935–1940

Rodolfo Joaquín Concepción, (1912 – June 21, 1940) was a popular Filipino film actor during the 1930s. He was dubbed Ang Idolong Kayumanggi (Brown Idol).

== Career ==
Concepción made his film debut in 1935, in Kundiman ng Puso (Song of the Heart).

He was often paired romantically in films with the soprano Rosario Moreno, with whom he co-starred in Mapait na Lihim (1938). Concepcion himself was also a notable singer, with a distinctive singing style. Unusual for actors of the time, his own singing voice was used.

After six movies for Sampaguita Pictures, becoming one of its most bankable stars, Concepción signed with another production company Excelsior Pictures, where he made Pakiusap, Ikaw Pa Rin, Tunay Na Ina (opposite Rosario Moreno), and his last unfinished movie Mahal Pa Rin Kita. Pakiusap and Tunay na Ina are two of only five Filipino films to survive World War II.

== Death ==
At age 28, the latter died of a peptic ulcer on June 21, 1940 at St. Luke's Hospital, during the shooting of Mahal Pa Rin Kita. His funeral was held on June 24, 1940 at the Manila North Cemetery, with approximately 120,000 people in attendance.

== Legacy and honors ==
In the early 1950s, Pancho Magalona portrayed Rudy Concepción in a biographical movie called Kasaysayan ni Rudy, opposite Linda Estrella.

He was posthumously inducted to the Eastwood City Walk of Fame in June 2008.

== Filmography ==
- 1935 - Kundiman ng Puso
- 1935 - Sumpa ng Aswang
- 1936 - Buhok ni Ester
- 1938 - Walang Pangalan
- 1938 - Paru-Parong Bukid
- 1938 - Himagsikan ng Puso
- 1938 - Alipin ng Palad
- 1938 - Mapait na Lihim
- 1939 - Gabay ng Magulang
- 1939 - Walang Tahanan
- 1939 - Tunay na Ina
- 1940 - Pakiusap
- 1940 - Ikaw Rin
- 1940 - Mahal Pa Rin Kita

== Awards ==
- Posthumous Celebrity Inductee, Eastwood City Walk Of Fame Philippines June 2008
