= Fermín Barva =

Fermín Barva was a Filipino pre-war director who made his film debut in a silent movie Ang Dugong Makamandag (The Poisonous Blood).

== Filmography ==
- 1932 – Ang Dugong Makamandag aka The Poisonous Blood
- 1934 - Mag-inang Mahirap
- 1934 - Hinagpis ng Magulang aka Wrath of Parents
- 1934 - X3X
- 1934 - Liwayway ng Kalayaan aka Dawn if Freedom
- 1935 - Ang Gulong ng Buhay aka The Wheel of Life
- 1936 - Malambot na Bato aka Soft Stone
- 1937 - Gamu-Gamong Naging Lawin
- 1937 - Umaraw sa Hatinggabi aka Midnight Becomes Morning
- 1937 - Magkapatid
- 1937 - Sanga-Sangang Dila
- 1937 - Sampaguitang Walang Bango
- 1938 - Makasalanan at Birhen - Philippine National Pictures
- 1939 - Pag-ibig ng Isang Ina - Philippine Artist Guild aka Mother's Love
- 1947 - Ang Estudyante
- 1949 - He Promised to Return - [Movietec]
- 1950 - The Pirates Go to Town - Lebran Pictures
- 1950 - Beasts of the East
- 1951 - Hiwaga ng Langit - Fortune Pictures aka Mystery of Heaven
- 1953 - Malapit sa Diyos - Lebran Pictures aka Close to God
- 1953 - Babaing Kalbo - Lebran Pictures aka Bald Lady
