= Fernando Poe Sr. =

Filipino actor and director

- Born: Allan Fernando Reyes Pou; November 27, 1916; San Carlos, Pangasinan, Philippine Islands
- Died: October 23, 1951 (aged 34); Manila, Philippines
- Resting place: Manila North Cemetery
- Other names: Allan F. Poe, Fernando Reyes Poe, Fernando Poe Sr.
- Education: University of the Philippines (BS); Philippine Dental College (MD)
- Occupations: Actor, director, producer, writer
- Years active: 1935–1951
- Spouses: Paulita Gomez (before 1936) Elizabeth Kelley (m. 1940)
- Children: 7, including Ronald Allan, Andy and Conrad
- Relatives: Grace Poe (adoptive granddaughter); Lovi Poe (granddaughter)

Allan Fernando Reyes Poe Sr. (né Pou; November 27, 1916 – October 23, 1951) was a Filipino actor and film director during the early era of cinema in the Philippines.

Poe was the father of Fernando Poe Jr., who later became a prominent actor and film industry icon. Prior to his son's rise to fame, he was known as Fernando Poe; he was later referred to as Fernando Poe Sr. to distinguish him from his son. He directed the first Darna film in 1951 before he died in the same year. As a leading man, he was often cast opposite Mona Lisa. He died because of rabies.

== Biography ==
Poe was born in San Carlos, Pangasinan, and later had six children with his second wife, Elizabeth "Bessie" Gatbonton Kelley of Pampanga: Elizabeth (Liz), Ronald Allan (Ronnie or FPJ), Fernando Jr. (Andy), Genevieve (Jenny), Fredrick (Freddieboy), and Evangeline (Eva). Poe and Kelly were married in 1940 after their first two children were born. Actor Conrad Poe (CP), meanwhile, was his illegitimate son by actress Patricia Mijares.

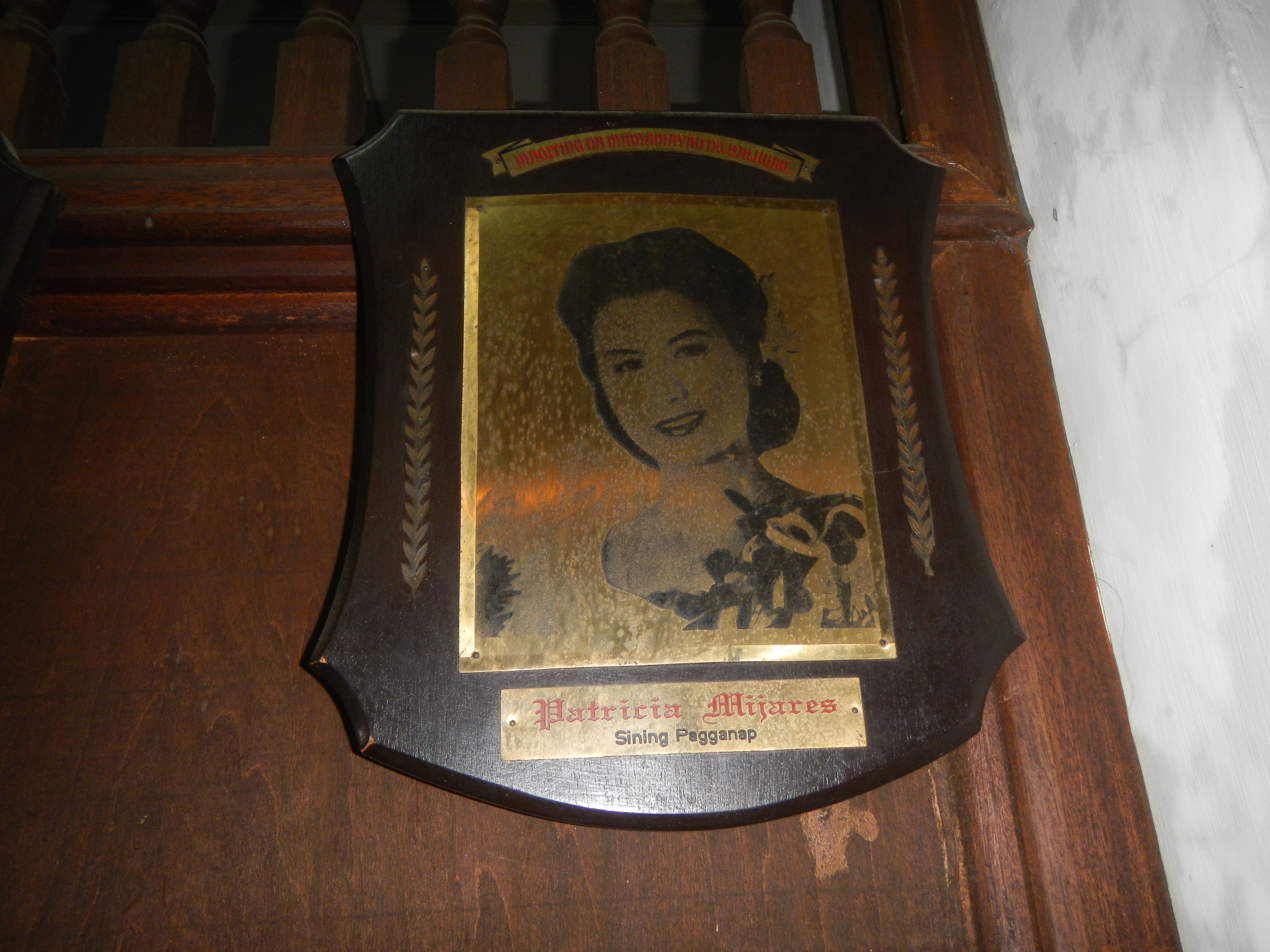
Patricia Mijares (Baliwag Museum and Library)

The original spelling of his surname was Pou (Catalan: ['pɔw]) via his father, playwright Lorenzo Pou, a Catalan immigrant from Mallorca in the Balearic Islands. Pou established a mining business in the Philippines and married a Pangasinense woman named Marta Reyes.

=== Military career ===
Unfortunately, World War II intervened. Twelve days after the war officially started in the Philippines, Poe, who was a member of the Reserve Officers of the Armed Forces of the Philippines, was called to active duty on December 20, 1941, as 1st Lieutenant. His first assignment was as assistant Provost Marshall of the 59th Provisionary Brigade under Gen. Simeon de Jesus, from December 1941 to January 1942. He rose to become a Platoon Leader, then the Morale Officer of the Lamao Combat Team Regiment. He saw action in Bataan—where he saved residents from a house bombed by the Japanese, carrying children and the wounded to safety. He stayed in his position until Bataan fell on April 9, 1942. With the surrender of the American-Filipino forces, Lt. Poe joined the dreaded Bataan Death March. He secretly joined the Panay Guerrillas under Col. Macario Peralta Jr. He became an undercover man of the Llanes Intelligence and Information Corps. These, he revealed, during his inquisition by the post-war Loyalty Status Board. He rose to become a captain, but there came a point when he had to leave his military career.

== Personal life ==
Poe graduated with the degree of Bachelor of Science in chemistry from the University of the Philippines in 1935 and the degree of Doctor of Dental Medicine from the Philippine Dental College in 1942.

== Death ==
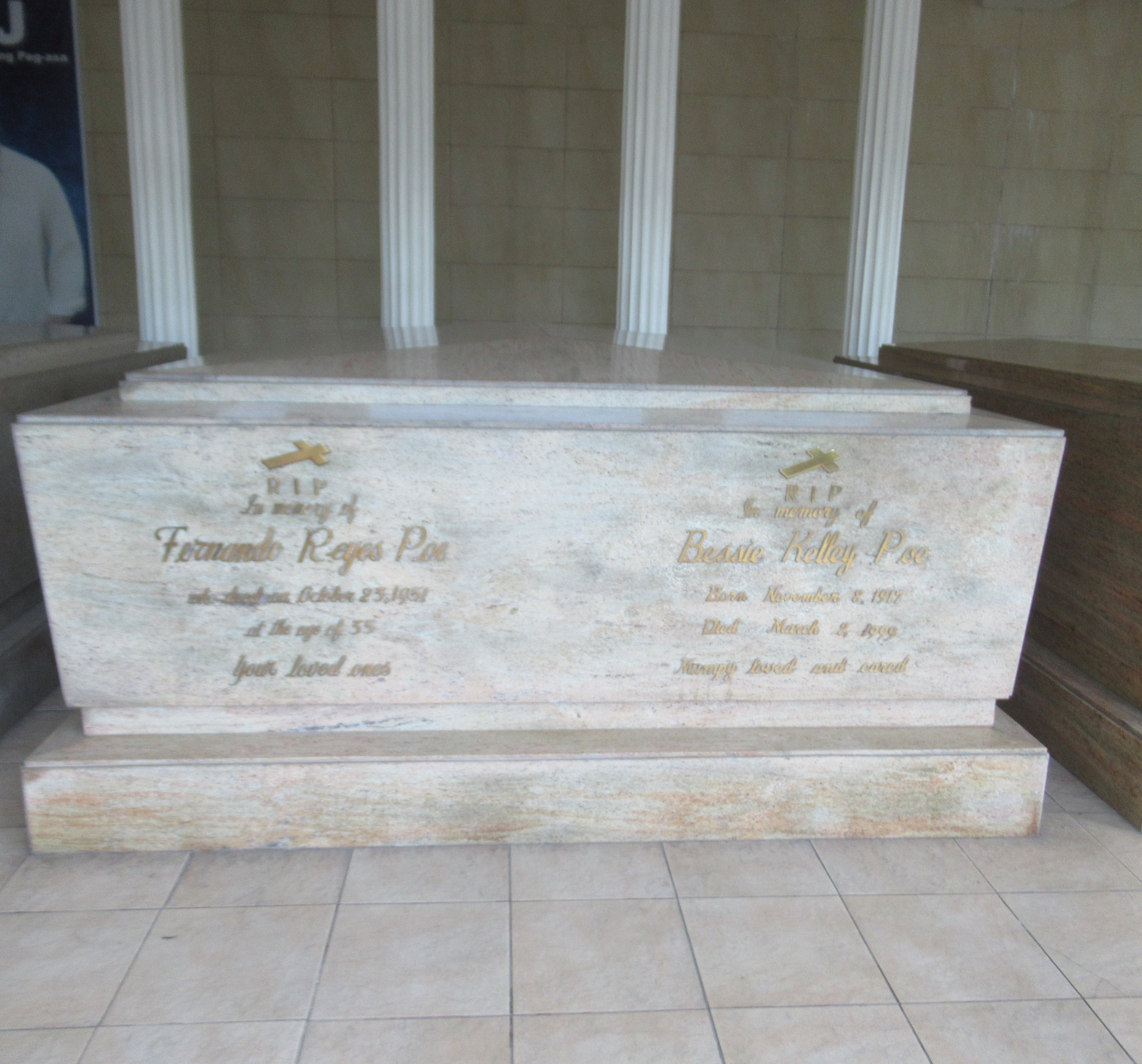
Tomb of Poe and his second wife Bessie at the Manila North Cemetery

Poe died on October 23, 1951, from rabies, shortly before the release of his last film Basag na Manika, in which he was the director. His wife reported that he had been bitten by a puppy in August, but did not get anti-rabies treatment in the mistaken belief that he did not have the virus. The same puppy also supposedly bit three of Poe's children, but they were all treated. However, in a later interview, his son Ronald Allan (better known by the stage name Fernando Poe Jr.) asserted that Poe wasn't bitten, but rather had let the puppy lick a wound to purportedly speed up the healing.

== Selected filmography ==
- Eseng ng Tondo (1937)
- Zamboanga (1937), also known as Fury in Paradise (UK)
- Giliw Ko (1939)
- Dawn of Freedom / Liwayway ng Kalayaan (1944)
- Dugo at Bayan (1946)
- Forbidden Women (1948)
- Darna (1951)
