= Elizabeth Cooper =

Filipina actress and entertainer

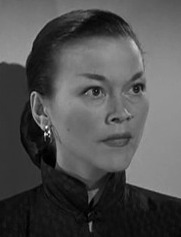
- Cooper appearing as Lilly Mae Wong in The Chinese Ring (1947)
- Born: Isabel Rosario Cooper; January 15, 1914 (or 1909/1912); Manila, Philippine Islands
- Died: June 29, 1960 (aged 46); Los Angeles, California, U.S.
- Other names: Dimples, Chabing

Elizabeth Cooper (born Isabel Rosario Cooper; January 15, 1914 (or 1909/1912) – June 29, 1960), also known by the stage names Chabing and Dimples, was a Filipina film actress, vaudeville dancer, and singer. In addition to her movie career, Cooper was also known for being the mistress of U.S. General Douglas MacArthur.

Born in Manila, she was famous for the first onscreen kiss in Philippine cinema, in the 1926 movie Ang Tatlong Hambog. In the 1930s, she met General Douglas MacArthur and became his paramour when she was around the age of 16 (or 18/21) and he was in his 50s. He arranged for her to follow him to Washington, D.C.

While serving as Army Chief of Staff in the 1930s, MacArthur filed a libel action against Drew Pearson, a journalist at The Washington Post. When Pearson added Cooper to his list of witnesses to be deposed, MacArthur dropped the suit. MacArthur subsequently paid Cooper $15,000 to leave Washington, the money allegedly delivered by his aide, Dwight D. Eisenhower. However, she did not return to the Philippines, and after a few failed attempts in Hollywood and a hairdressing shop in the Midwest, she committed suicide in 1960.

== Early life ==
Cooper's precise date of birth is unclear. Her death certificate lists her date of birth as January 15, 1914, but she may have been born as early as 1909 or 1912. Cooper herself provided various dates of birth over the course of her life, ranging from 1909 to 1921. It is likely that her parents were Isaac Cooper (born c. 1875, of Scottish descent), an American-born firefighter and veteran of the Philippine–American War, and Protacia Rubin (born 1894), a Chinese-Filipino woman. They married around 1908 and lived in Manila before relocating to the continental United States in 1916. The pair separated soon after; in 1919, Protacia Rubin and Isabel Cooper moved back to Manila. Upon her return to the Philippines, Rubin married American soldier Thomas Bernard Ryan; it is likely that she did so without divorcing Cooper. Ryan contracted tuberculosis and died at sea in 1925 while traveling to the United States to seek treatment.

At age 12 or 13, Isabel Cooper dropped out of school and became a bodabil performer under the guidance of Luis Borromeo, who gave her the stage name "Dimples". Given her stepfather's illness, it is likely that the revenue from Isabel's performances served as the primary source of income for the family.

== Film career ==
Isabel appeared in a few B-grade Filipino films starting in 1925, under the screen name "Chabing". Two of her films were Miracles of Love (1925) and Ang Tatlong Hambog (1926). In the latter film, Cooper made history with Luis Tuason when they performed the very first kissing scene in a Philippine film. She was just around 12 years old at the time.

She did not act in any Filipino films after 1930, although the 1941 Tagalog film Ikaw Pala is sometimes wrongly attributed to her. "Ikaw Pala" had another actress named Cresencia Aligada acting in it in a supporting role; Aligada also went by the screen name "Dimples," hence the mistaken identity.

After her 1934 break-up with MacArthur, Cooper attempted to find roles in Hollywood, landing some smaller bit roles under the stage name "Chabing" including The Chinese Ring (1947), The Art of Burlesque (1950), and I Was an American Spy (1951).

== Relationship with Douglas MacArthur ==
In 1930, at the age of 16 (or 18/21), Cooper met the American General Douglas MacArthur, then commander of all U.S. troops in the Philippines. MacArthur's marriage had ended a year earlier. Cooper became his mistress in Manila, a fact the 50-year-old MacArthur hid from his 80-year-old mother. In Manila, the teenage Cooper lived in the Paco district.

Five months after they first met, MacArthur returned to the United States; while he intended to bring her to Washington, he could not risk scandal by traveling with her, so he bought her a ticket on a ship to arrive after him. She arrived in Washington and ended up ensconced in an apartment in Georgetown, Washington, D.C. MacArthur later moved her to the Chastleton Hotel (now a co-op building). According to one biographer of MacArthur, William Manchester, MacArthur "showered [Cooper] with presents and bought her many lacy tea gowns, but no raincoat. She didn't need one, he told her; her duty lay in bed."

In 1933, when the secret affair threatened to become public, MacArthur brought it to an end, reportedly giving her $15,000 and a ticket back to the Philippines. She did not use the ticket and never returned to the Philippines. In 1934, the 20-year-old (or 22/25-year-old) Cooper moved to Oklahoma, where she owned a hairdressing salon. In 1935 she married Frank E. Kennemore, a lawyer.

Cooper moved to Los Angeles a few years later. She divorced Kennemore in 1942 and married Filipino-American bartender Milton Moreno in 1944. Cooper tried to find work as an actress in Hollywood; however, the only roles that she could get were those as an extra, such as a geisha and a Filipina nurse in films. In 1946, she played one of Rex Harrison's concubines in Anna and the King of Siam. In Unconquered, she played an unidentified and uncredited Native American. Her final film was I Was an American Spy (1951). Soon after, she divorced Moreno. Over time, she became very depressed over her failed relationships and career.

== Death ==
In 1960, Cooper died by suicide by overdosing on barbiturates. She was 46 (or 48/51) years old. She was buried on July 5, 1960, in an unmarked grave in Holy Cross Cemetery in Culver City, California.

== Filmography ==
- 1925 Miracles of Love
- 1926 Ang Tatlong Hambog
- 1927 Fate or Consequence
- 1943 So Proudly We Hail!
- 1944 The Story of Dr. Wassell
- 1944 The Purple Heart
- 1946 Anna and the King of Siam
- 1947 The Chinese Ring
- 1947 Unconquered
- 1947 Singapore
- 1947 Boomerang
- 1948 Shanghai Chest
- 1950 The Art of Burlesque
- 1950 The Great Jewel Robber
- 1951 Anne of the Indies
- 1951 I Was an American Spy

== Bibliography ==
- Manchester, William (September 30, 1978). American Caesar: Douglas MacArthur, 1880-1964. Little, Brown. ISBN 9780316544986.
- Garcia, Jessie B. (2004). A Movie Album Quizbook. Iloilo City, Philippines: Erehwon Books & Magazine. pp. 78–80, 127. ISBN 971-93297-0-X.
