= Jaime de la Rosa =

Filipino actor and politician (1921-1992)

- De la Rosa, c. 1950s

Member of the Manila City Council from the 4th district
- In office February 2, 1988 – June 30, 1992

Personal details
- Born: Tomás Lim de la Rosa; September 18, 1921 Lubao, Pampanga, Philippine Islands
- Died: December 2, 1992 (aged 71) Manila, Philippines
- Resting place: Loyola Memorial Park, Marikina, Philippines
- Citizenship: Philippines
- Party: Lakas (1992); Liberal (1987–1992)
- Spouse: Beatriz Ocampo Santos
- Relations: Rogelio de la Rosa (brother); África de la Rosa (sister); Purita de la Rosa (sister); Jackson de la Rosa (brother)
- Children: 3
- Occupation: Actor, politician
- Nickname(s): Tommy, Jaime

Jaime Lim de la Rosa (September 18, 1921 – December 2, 1992) was a Filipino actor and politician active in showbiz from the 1940s to 1960. He also served as a councilor of Manila from the 4th district from 1988 to 1992.

== Early life ==
Tomás de la Rosa was the first screen name he used, later changing it to Jaime. He was born in Lubao, Pampanga, on September 18, 1921.

== Personal life ==
De la Rosa as the younger brother of Rogelio dela Rosa and became one of LVN Pictures's bankable stars. He was married to Beatriz S. Dela Rosa (December 5, 1922 – September 18, 2000) with whom he would have three daughters. He had Spanish and Chinese ancestry.

== Death ==
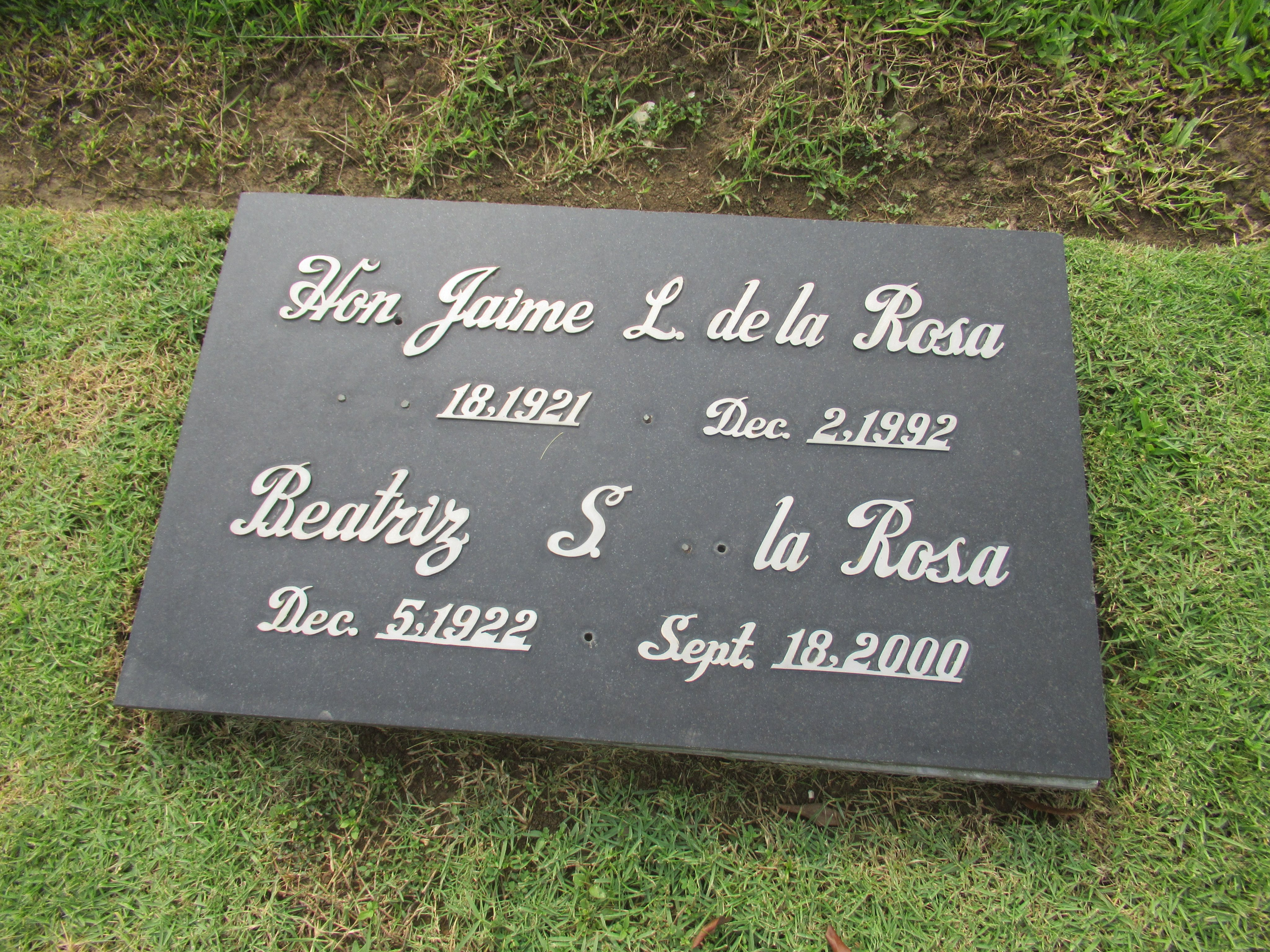
Grave of De la Rosa and his wife Beatriz at Loyola Memorial Park, Marikina

De la Rosa died on December 2, 1992. He was buried at Loyola Memorial Park in Marikina.

== Filmography ==
- 1939: Mga Anak ng Lansangan
- 1940: Cadena de amor
- 1940: Bawal na Pag-ibig
- 1940: Kahapon Lamang
- 1941: Ibong Sawi
- 1946: Garrison 13
- 1946: Aladin
- 1947: Bagong Manunubos
- 1947: Ikaw ay Akin
- 1947: Binatang Taring
- 1947: Romansa
- 1948: Engkantada
- 1948: Krus na Bituin
- 1948: Waling-Waling
- 1948: Hamak na Dakila
- 1948: Tanikalang papel
- 1948: Malikmata
- 1949: Parola
- 1949: Gitano
- 1949: Tambol Mayor
- 1949: Padre Burgos
- 1949: Biglang Yaman
- 1949: Batalyon XIII
- 1950: Nuno sa Punso
- 1950: Kontrabando
- 1950: In Despair
- 1951: Reyna Elena
- 1951: Satur
- 1951: Anak ng Pulubi
- 1951: Shalimar
- 1951: Probinsiyano
- 1951: Amor mio
- 1952: Korea
- 1952: Sa Paanan ng Nazareno
- 1952: Digmaan ng Damdamin
- 1952: Taong Paniki
- 1952: Kabalyerong Itim
- 1952: Haring Solomon
- 1953: Loida
- 1953: Dyesebel
- 1953: Batanguena
- 1954: Dalawang Panata
- 1954: Virtuoso
- 1954: Doce Pares
- 1954: Donato
- 1954: Tinalikdang Dambana
- 1954: Galawgaw
- 1955: Saydwok Bendor
- 1955: Niña Bonita
- 1955: Dinayang Pagmamahal
- 1956: No Money..No Honey
- 1956: Luksang Tagumpay
- 1956: Medalyong Perlas
- 1956: Kumander 13
- 1957: Hukom Roldan
- 1957: Turista
- 1958: Faithful
