= Zamboanga (film) =

- Directed by: Eduardo de Castro
- Starring: Fernando Poe; Rosa del Rosario
- Cinematography: William H. Jansen
- Edited by: Ralph Dixon
- Music by: Edward Kilenyi Sr.
- Production company: Filippine Films
- Release date: 10 December 1937 (United States)
- Running time: 65 minutes
- Country: Philippines
- Languages: Tagalog; Tausug

Zamboanga is a 1937 Philippine drama film directed by Eduardo de Castro starring Fernando Poe and Rosa del Rosario and was produced by Filippine Films. It premiered in the United States on 10 December 1937. It was considered a "lost film" until the early 2000s, when an original copy of the film was retrieved in Finland.

== Premise ==
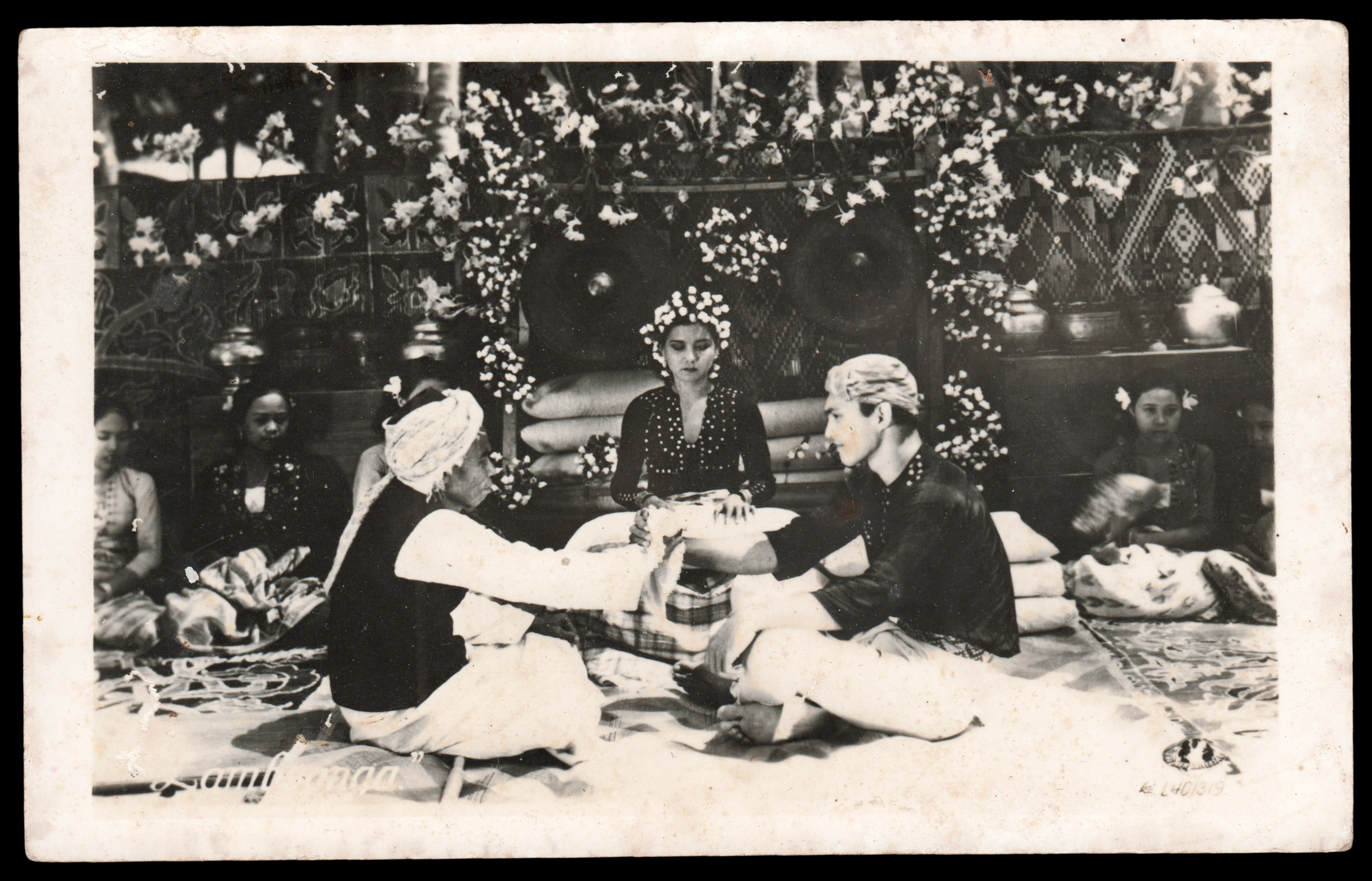
Postcard about Zamboanga

Zamboanga centers around a sea-faring tribe ruled by Datu Tanbuong, which relied on pearl farming. Danao (Fernando Poe) is betrothed to the datu's granddaughter, Minda (Rosa del Rosario).

Hadji Razul, a leader of pirate Moro tribe, kidnaps Minda which led to a tribal war between the groups of Tanbuong and Razul. The conflict ends with Danao rescuing Minda and the demise of Razul. Danao and Minda marry and sail into the sunset.

== Production ==
Zamboanga was produced by Filippine Films by American duo George Harris and Eddie Tait. The two hired Filipino-American Eduardo de Castro to direct the film, with William H. Jansen serving as the cameraman. Jansen's skills utilized underwater videography for the film. Principal photography began in 1936, taking place in Jolo Island in Sulu for nine months. Shot in 35mm, negatives of the film were sent to Hollywood in April 1937 for post-production. Louis R. Morse was responsible for Zamboanga's sound recording, Ralph Dixon for the editing, and Edward Kilenyi Sr. did the musical score.

== Release ==
Zamboanga was produced for the United States market, where films with "exotic" setting were in demand at the time. It premiered in San Diego, California on 10 December 1937 and was also screened in New York. It was also reportedly screened in Europe, in countries such as Finland, France, and Spain. It was also screened in the Philippines at the Lyric Theater in Escolta, Manila after its premier in the United States.

Zamboanga runs for at least 65 minutes and was originally filmed in the Tausug and Tagalog languages. It was refilmed in English, and was subtitled for Non-English speaking audiences.

== Lost, retrieval, and preservation ==
The film was believed to be a "lost film" in the Philippines, until Nick Deocampo found an original copy in the United States Library of Congress. The copy itself, which in turn came from Finland, was repatriated back to the Philippines and was screened in the country as part of the 2004 Pelikula at Lipunan film festival. In 2017, the Film Development Council of the Philippines did a restoration on Zamboanga and keeps a copy of the film in its archive.

== Reception ==
In the 1930s, Zamboanga was described by Hollywood director Frank Capra as "the most exciting and beautiful picture of native life" he have ever seen.

Filipino musicologist José Buenconsejo characterized Zamboanga as Orientalist. He note several inaccuracies with the actual local culture of Mindanao, the trope of abduction of women from the seraglio (a narrative device popular in Europe in the 18th century in stories involving the Ottomans), and the portrayal of the Moro, particularly the antagonist Hadji's side, as civilized yet still barbaric.

He also noted the authentic use of kulintang in the film but was critical of the incorporation of soft Javanese music with kulintang accompanying the scene depicting entertainment at Hadji's court. Buenconsejo also pointed out the usage of "Hawaiian" sound to establish the film's tropical setting. For the filming technique he praised the underwater shooting which he finds more advanced than Zamboanga's contemporaries Bird of Paradise and Tabu.
