= Andy Centenera =

Filipino actor

Andrés Centenera
- Born: 1914; The Philippine Islands
- Died: pre–1984 Philippines
- Occupations: Filipino actor
- Years active: 1937–1979

Andrés Centenera (born 1914, date of death unknown) was a Filipino character actor. He was the grandfather of Filipino singer Rafael Centenera. He appeared in films from 1937 to 1979.

Andres Centenera, born in Goa, Camarines Sur. He was the son of Doña Rita Garchitorena and Don Candido Garcia Centenera. He was the grandson of Don Andres Garchitorena, member of Aguinaldo's Hong Kong Junta and Governor of Ambos Camarines.

In 1975, he was cast as the village chieftain in NV Productions' Banaue starring superstars Nora Aunor and Christopher de Leon.

Centenera also worked as a boxing referee. In 1983, it was noted that Centenera was deceased.

== Filmography ==
- 1937 - Teniente Rosario
- 1938 - Alipin ng Palad
- 1938 - Dahong Lagas
- 1939 - Punit na Bandila
- 1939 - Tatlong Pagkabirhen
- 1939 - Ang Kaban ng Tipan
- 1949 - Alamat ng Perlas Na Itim
- 1949 - Bulakenyo
- 1950 - Siete Infantes de Lara
- 1950 - Genghis Khan
- 1951 - Sigfredo
- 1951 - Romeo at Julieta
- 1952 - Kalbaryo ni Hesus
- 1956 - Buhay at Pag-ibig ni Dr. Jose Rizal
- 1957 - Kahariang Bato
- 1958 - Kilabot sa Sta. Barbara
- 1961 - Noli Me Tángere
- 1965 - Tagani
- 1965 - Once Before I Die
- 1968 - Brides of Blood
- 1968 - Escape to Mindanao
- 1971 - Beast of the Yellow Night
- 1972 - The Big Bird Cage
- 1973 - The Twilight People
- 1973 - Beyond Atlantis
- 1974 - Black Mamba
- 1975 - Banaue: Stairway to the Sky
