= Rogelio de la Rosa =

Filipino actor and politician (1916–1986)

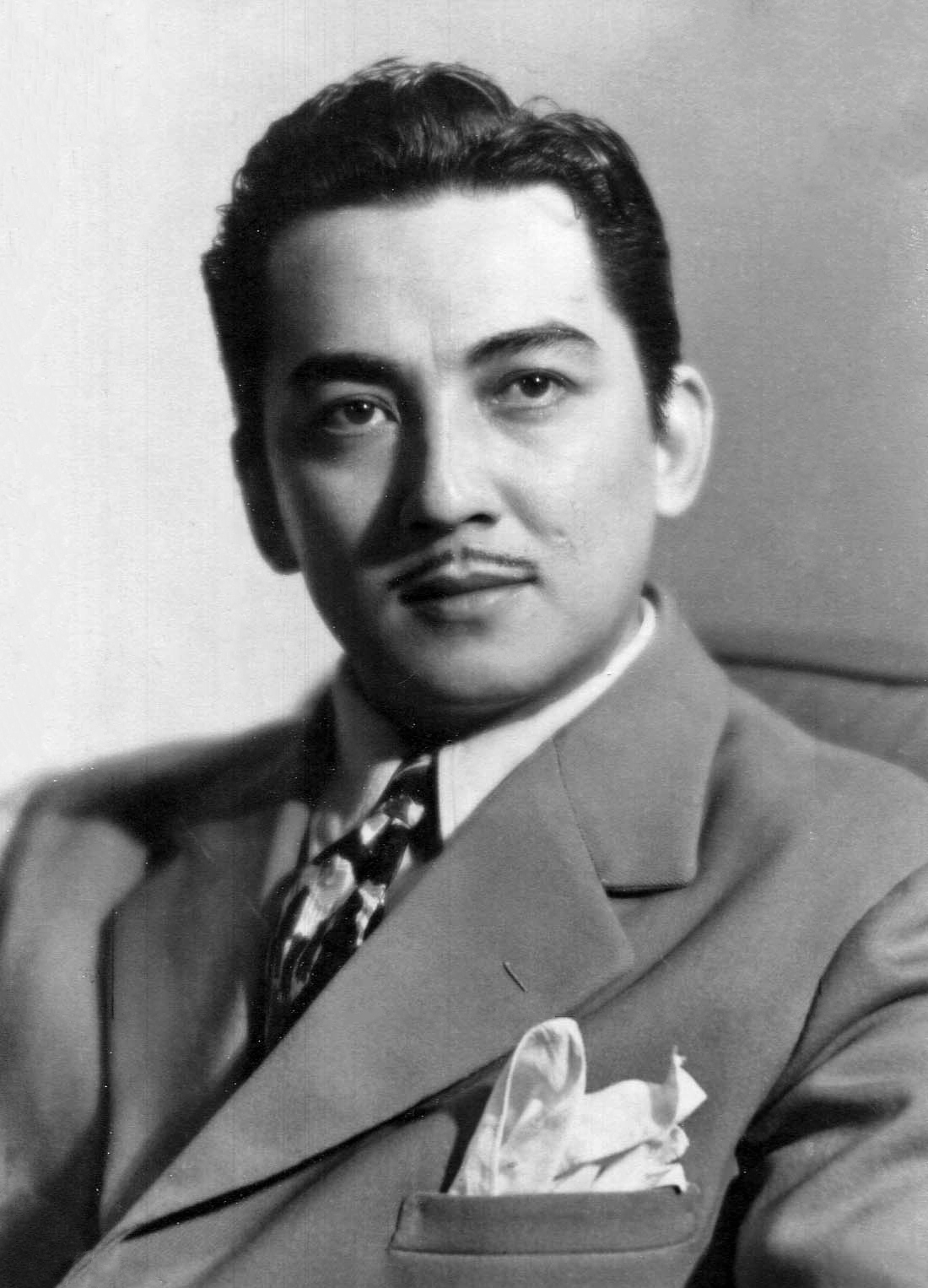
- Official portrait, 1960

Senator of the Philippines
- In office December 30, 1957 – December 30, 1963

Personal details
- Born: Regidor Lim de la Rosa; November 12, 1916 Lubao, Pampanga, Philippine Islands
- Died: November 26, 1986 (aged 70) Manila, Philippines
- Resting place: Loyola Memorial Park - Marikina, Philippines
- Party: Independent (1963–1984; 1984–1986)
- Other political affiliations: KBL (1984); Liberal (1957–1963)
- Spouse(s): María de los Dolores Bayot y Zurbito; Carlota Delgado
- Relations: Purita de la Rosa (sister); Jaime de la Rosa (brother); África de la Rosa (sister); Jackson de la Rosa (brother)
- Children: 7
- Education: Far Eastern University
- Occupation: Actor, politician, diplomat

Rogelio de la Rosa (born Regidor Lim de la Rosa; November 12, 1916 – November 26, 1986), was a Filipino actor and politician. He was often named the greatest Filipino matinee idol of all time. He is also remembered for his statesmanship, and in particular, for his accomplishments as a diplomat. Elected to the Philippine Senate from 1957 to 1963, he was the first Filipino film actor to parlay his fame into a substantial political career, paving the way for future Filipino entertainers-turned-politicians.

== Early life and background ==
Regidor Lim de la Rosa was born in the barrio of San Jose Gumi, Lubao, Pampanga, the son of an arnis champion. Lubao was also the hometown of Diosdado Macapagal, six years his senior and a future political opponent and brother-in-law. Macapagal's first wife, Purita, was de la Rosa's sister. He has Spanish and Chinese ancestry.

While in high school, de la Rosa, along with Macapagal would regularly perform in zarzuelas as a villain.

As a teenager, he was cast by his uncle, a film director, in a starring role in the silent film Ligaw na Bulaklak opposite Rosa del Rosario. The film's director, José Nepomuceno, gave him the screen name "Rogelio de la Rosa". However, the young actor did not then engage in a regular film career, opting instead to attend college at the Far Eastern University in Manila. An excellent collegiate athlete and debater in the years from 1932 to 1934. In 1933, de la Rosa won the Claro M. Recto Gold Medal in a national oratorical contest.

== Film career ==
De la Rosa burst into stardom in the late 1930s after being frequently cast in dramas as a romantic idol opposite such actresses as Rosa del Rosario, Carmen Rosales, Emma Alegre, and Paraluman. Rosales proved to be his most durable onscreen partner, and their "love team" is said to be among the most successful in the history of Philippine movies.

When the Philippine film industry was held to a standstill during the Japanese occupation from 1941 to 1945, de la Rosa remained in the public eye as a bodabil performer at the Life Theater in Manila. After the war, he resumed his film career and proved more popular than ever. He emerged as a star, perhaps the most popular film actor of the first decade of the post-war. He formed his own film production company, RDR Productions, and starred as well in productions of LVN Pictures, often with Rosales.

By 1948, he was the highest paid Filipino movie actor. His success in films remained steady in the 1950s. He had been cast as the first Filipino actor, under the name of Ramon Del Gado, to star in an American-produced movie, The Sword of Avenger. His 1955 role in Higit sa Lahat with Emma Alegre earned him the 'Best Actor' trophy at the 1956 FAMAS awards, as well as the Best Actor Award at the 1956 Southeast Asian Film Festival in Hong Kong.

== Political career ==
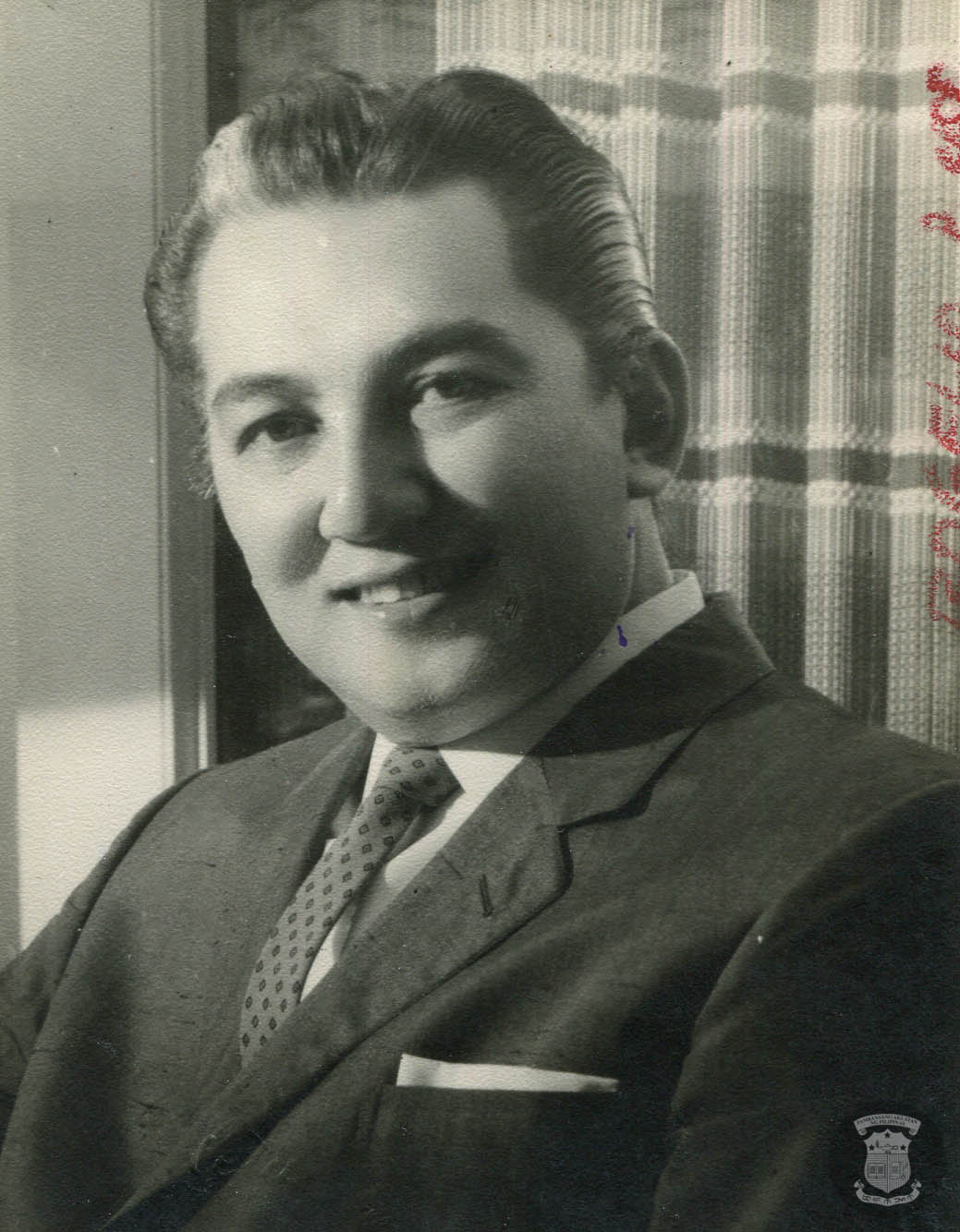
A portrait of Dela Rosa

=== As a senator ===
In the 1957 general elections, de la Rosa ran and won a seat in the Philippine Senate under the banner of the Liberal Party. He served for one 6-year term spanning the 4th and 5th Congress. As a Senator, he was active in issues of particular concern within his home province of Pampanga such as fisheries and agriculture, emerging as a strong advocate for nationalization of those industries. Appropriately, de la Rosa was also interested in issues relating to the Filipino film industry, co-authoring a bill that would lead to the establishment of a Board of Censors.

=== Presidential candidate ===
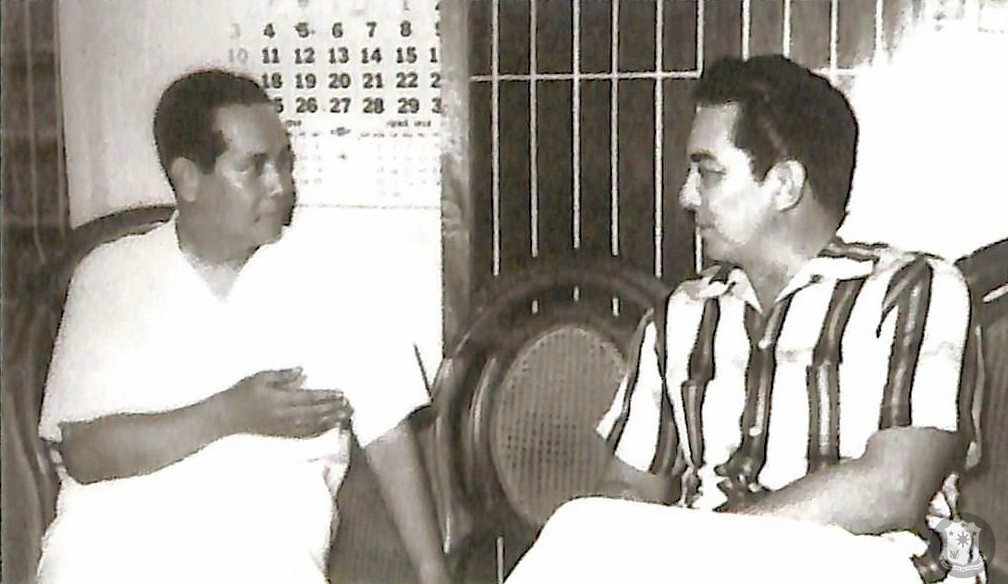
Diosdado Macapagal (left) and De la Rosa (right) before he withdrew his candidacy for president in 1961.

After three years in the Senate, de la Rosa decided to run for the presidency as an independent candidate. His residual popularity as a film star, as well as the unpopularity of incumbent re-electionist Nacionalista Carlos P. Garcia made him a credible candidate. The other major candidate in the race was then-Vice President Macapagal of the Liberal Party, his former brother-in-law.

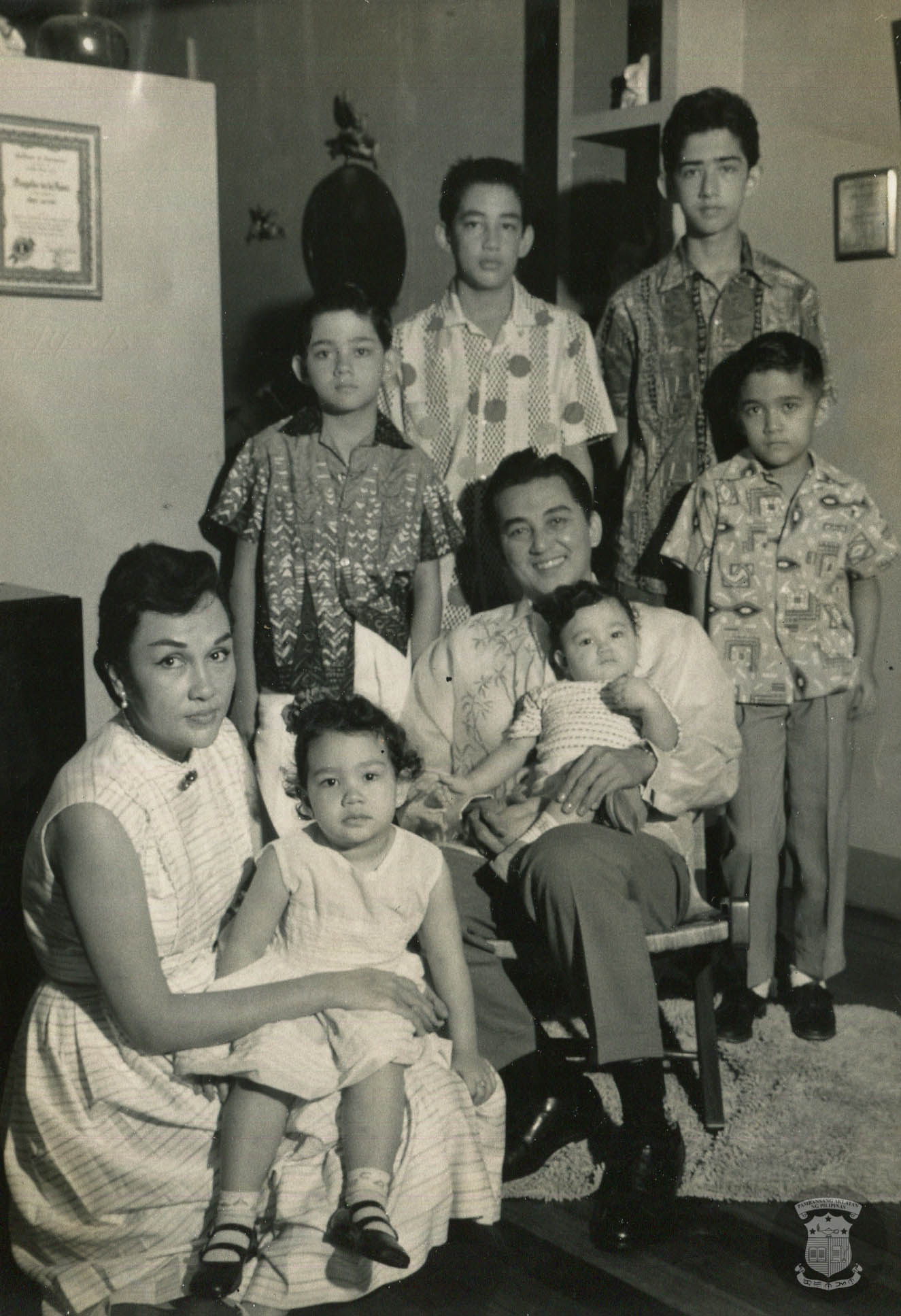
De la Rosa (right) with his wife Lota Delgado (left)

Shortly before election day, de la Rosa withdrew from the election at a studio in DZAQ-TV. According to his official Senate biography, de la Rosa was concerned about the strength of what he perceived as the corrupt political machinery of President Garcia, and was ultimately convinced that his withdrawal from the race was the only way to ensure Garcia's defeat. Whatever the motivation, de la Rosa's gambit proved successful, and Macapagal was easily elected over Garcia. Returning to the Liberal Party, de la Rosa was defeated for re-election to the Senate in the 1963 general elections. He would never again be elected to public office.

== Diplomat and later years ==
De la Rosa remained in public service as an acclaimed diplomat. In 1965, he was appointed Philippine Ambassador to Cambodia, an important designation considering that country's proximity to the Philippines. During the administration of Ferdinand Marcos, de la Rosa was also named as Philippine Ambassador to the Netherlands, and to the Soviet bloc countries of Poland, Bulgaria and Czechoslovakia. He was duly admired for his savvy in foreign affairs and language proficiency. He also used his position to promote Filipino art and culture and to assist Filipino artists performing abroad. His last diplomatic post was Philippine Ambassador to Sri Lanka.

After retiring from the diplomatic corps, De la Rosa made his last foray into politics by unsuccessfully running in the 1984 Batasang Pambansa parliamentary election. Shortly before his death from a heart attack in 1986, he played one last acting role, in a guest spot on the popular drama anthology Coney Reyes on Camera.

== Personal life and death ==
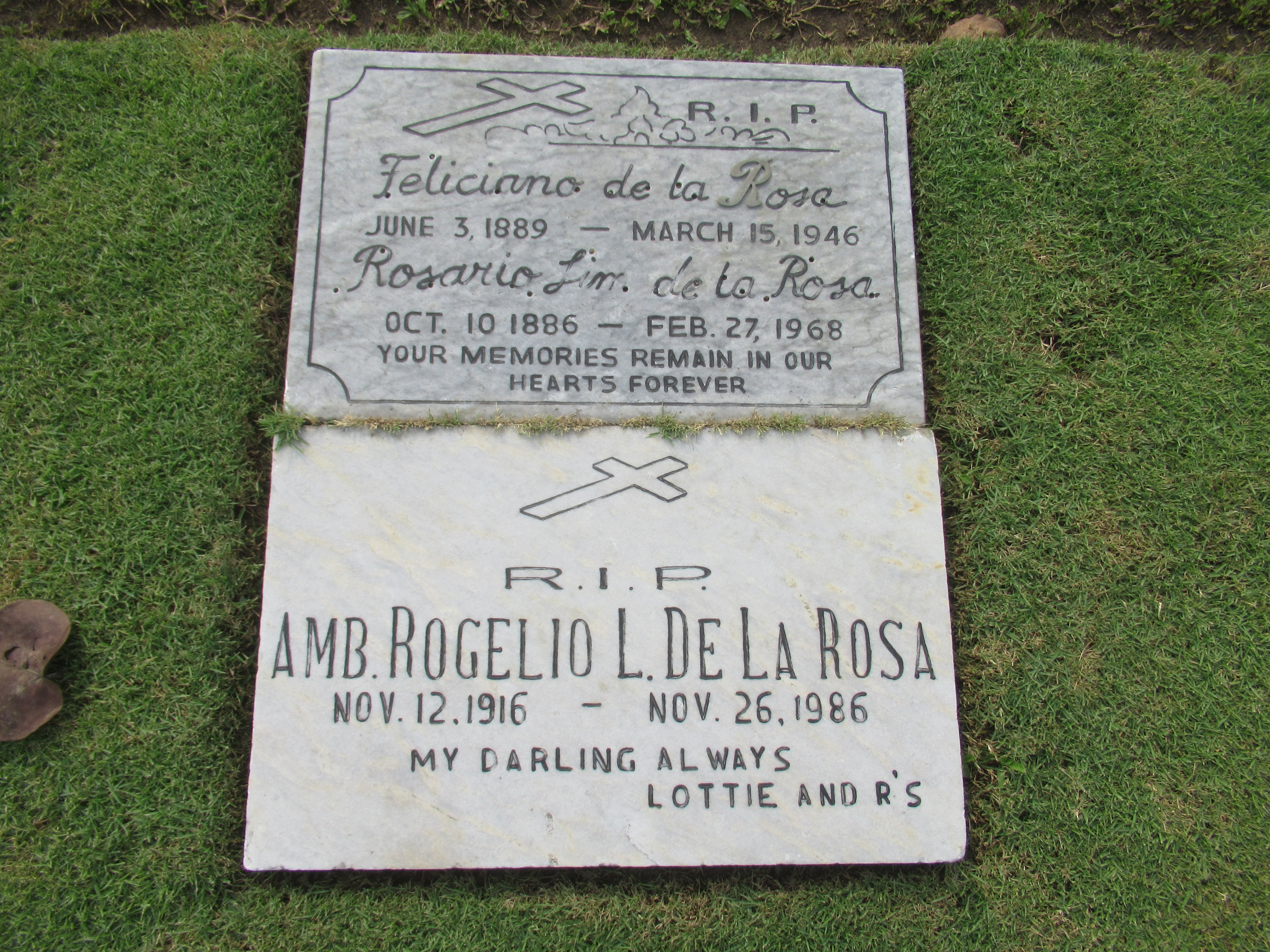
De la Rosa, Rosario Lim and Feliciano

De la Rosa was married twice. His second wife, Lota Delgado, was a former leading lady of his in films. He was buried in Loyola Memorial Park in Marikina, beside his brother's grave.

=== Death ===
De la Rosa died of a heart attack on November 26, 1986, at the age of 70 years old.

== Electoral history ==
Electoral history of Rogelio de la Rosa
| Year | Office | Party | Votes received | | | | Result |
| Year | Office | Party | Total | % | P. | Swing | Result |
|---|---|---|---|---|---|---|---|
| 1957 | Senator of the Philippines | Liberal | 1,715,123 | 33.58% | 4th | —N/a | Won |
| 1963 | Senator of the Philippines | Liberal | 2,465,488 | 31.97% | 15th | —N/a | Lost |
| 1984 | Mambabatas Pambansa (Assemblyman) from Pampanga | KBL | —N/a | —N/a | 8th | —N/a | Lost |

== Selected filmography ==
- 1930: Bago lumubog ang araw
- 1932: Ligaw na Bulaklak
- 1932: Tianak
- 1932: Ulong Inasnan
- 1933: Nahuling Pagsisisi
- 1933: Ang Ganid
- 1934: Sawing Palad
- 1934: Krus na Bato
- 1936: Buhok ni Ester
- 1936: Diwata ng Karagatan - Jose
- 1936: Kalupitan ng Tadhana
- 1936: Awit ng mga Ulila
- 1936: Anak-Dalita
- 1936: Lagablab ng Kabataan
- 1937: Anak ng Pari
- 1937: Magkapatid
- 1937: Teniente Rosario
- 1937: Bituing Marikit
- 1938: Mga Sugat ng Puso
- 1938: Makiling
- 1938: Bukang Liwayway
- 1938: Ang Magmamani - Luis
- 1938: Sanggumay
- 1938: Bahay-Kubo
- 1939: Magkaisang Landas
- 1939: Lagot Na Kuwintas
- 1939: Pasang Krus
- 1939: Takip-Silim
- 1939: Inang Mahal
- 1939: Florante at Laura
- 1939: Dalisay
- 1939: Ang Magsasampaguita
- 1940: Lambingan
- 1940: Senorita
- 1940: Nang Mahawi ang Ulap
- 1940: Gunita
- 1940: Diwa ng Awit
- 1940: Colegiala
- 1940: Magbalik ka, Hirang
- 1940: Katarungan
- 1940: Estrellita
- 1941: Tampuhan
- 1941: Tarhata
- 1941: Panambitan
- 1941: Ang Maestra
- 1941: Serenata sa Nayon
- 1942: Caballero
- 1942: Anong Ganda Mo
- 1944: Perfidia
- 1946: Tagumpay
- 1946: Garrison 13
- 1946: Ang Prinsipeng Hindi Tumatawa
- 1946: Dalawang Daigdig
- 1946: Honeymoon
- 1946: Victory Joe
- 1946: Angelus
- 1947: Ang Lalaki
- 1947: Ang Himala ng Birhen sa Antipolo
- 1947: Sarung Banggi - Nanding
- 1947: Hagibis
- 1947: Backpay
- 1948: Ang Vengador
- 1948: Hampas ng Langit
- 1948: Sa Tokyo Ikinasal - Carlos
- 1948: Bulaklak at Paruparo
- 1949: Kampanang Ginto
- 1949: Bandilang Basahan
- 1949: Camelia
- 1949: Kidlat sa Silangan
- 1949: Ang Hiwaga ng Tulay na Bato
- 1949: Ang Lumang Bahay sa Gulod
- 1949: Milyonarya - Delfin Glorioso
- 1950: 48 Oras - Ricardo
- 1950: Doble Cara
- 1950: Prinsipe Amante - Rodrigo
- 1950: Tigang na Lupa
- 1950: Sohrab at Rustum
- 1950: Ang Kampana ng San Diego
- 1951: Bayan o Pag-ibig
- 1951: Prinsipe Amante sa Rubitanya
- 1951: Haring Cobra - Felipe / Haring Cobra
- 1952: Dimas: The Sainted Robber - Dimas
- 1952: Romansa sa Nayon
- 1952: Babaeng hampaslupa
- 1952: Irisan
- 1953: Sa Paanan ng Bundok - Ric
- 1954: Maala-Ala Mo Kaya? - Celso
- 1954: Dakilang Pgpapakasakit - Roberto
- 1954: Jack & Jill - Gardo
- 1954: Ikaw ang Buhay Ko
- 1954: Aristokrata
- 1955: Ang Tangi kong Pag-ibig
- 1955: El conde de Monte Carlo
- 1955: Higit sa Lahat - Roberto
- 1955: Sonny Boy
- 1955: Iyung-Iyo
- 1955: Pandanggo ni Neneng
- 1955: Artista
- 1956: Lydia
- 1956: Apat na Kasaysayang Ginto - (First segment -"Ngayon at Kailan Man")
- 1956: Babaing Mandarambong
- 1956: Idolo
- 1956: Pampanggenya
- 1956: Gintong Pangarap
- 1957: Veronica
- 1957: Sino ang Maysala
- 1961: Dugo at Luha - (final film role)
