= Gregorio Fernandez =

Filipino actor and director

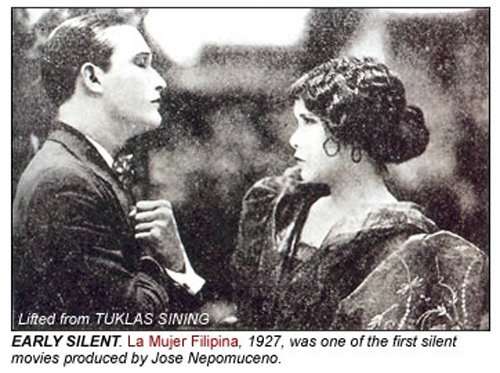
- Gregorio Fernandez (left) and Juanita Ángeles in La mujer filipina (1927)
- Born: Gregorio Montemayor Fernandez; May 25, 1904; Lubao, Pampanga, Philippine Islands
- Died: March 11, 1973 (aged 68); Quezon City, Philippines
- Resting place: San Felipe Neri Catholic Cemetery, Mandaluyong, Metro Manila
- Other names: Doc Greg, Yoyong
- Occupations: Actor, director, screenwriter, dentist
- Years active: 1927–1971
- Spouse: Paz Padilla (m. 1936; died 1957)
- Children: 8 (including Rudy)
- Relatives: Mark Anthony Fernandez (grandson); Renz Fernandez (grandson); Grae Fernandez (great-grandson); Rogelio dela Rosa (nephew)

Gregorio Montemayor Fernandez (May 25, 1904 – March 11, 1973) was a Filipino film actor, director and dentist, and was the father of actor Rudy Fernandez.

== Personal life ==
Fernandez was born on May 25, 1904, to former Lubao Mayor Eugenio Araneta Fernandez and Maria Montemayor. He married Paz Padilla (daughter of Jose Padilla Sr.) in 1936. The couple had eight children, including Merle Fernandez (born 1939) and Rudy Fernandez (1952–2008). Padilla committed suicide in Fernandez's home in 1957 due to postpartum depression, while one of his sons also committed suicide out of fear of being punished for his actions by Fernandez.

== Filmography ==
=== Director ===
Year	Title
1937	Asahar at Kabaong
1938	Celia at Balagtas
1939	Tatlong Pagkabirhen
1940	Señorita
1946	Garrison 13
1947	Miss Philippines
1948	Puting Bantayog
1949	Hen. Gregorio Del Pilar
1949	Kampanang Ginto
1949	Capas
1950	Kontrabando
1950	Candaba
1951	Dugo sa Dugo
1951	Bayan o Pag-Ibig
1952	Rodrigo de Villa
1953	Squatters
1953	Philippine Navy
1953	Dagohoy
1954	Singsing Na Tanso
1955	Dalagang Taring
1955	Higit sa Lahat
1956	Medalyong Perlas (segment "Kapalaran")
1956	Luksang Tagumpay
1957	Sampung Libong Pisong Pag-Ibig
1957	Hukom Roldan
1958	Malvarosa
1958	Casa Grande
1958	Ay Petita!
1958	Ana Maria
1959	Panagimpan
1960	Kung Ako'y Mahal Mo
1960	Awit ng Mga Dukha
1963	Emily
1963	The Macapagal Story
1966	Ang Nasasakdal!
1971	Daing

=== Actor ===
Year	Title	Role
1927	Hot Kisses	
1927	The Filipino Woman	
1928	Ang Lumang Simbahan	
1930	Child Out of Wedlock	
1931	Ang Lihim ni Bathala	
1931	Moro Pirates	
1932	Ligaw Na Bulaklak	
1937	Taong Demonyo	
1937	Asahar at Kabaong	
1946	Prinsipeng Hindi Tumatawa	
1949	Florante at Laura	Sultan Aliadab
1949	Kampanang Ginto	
1949	Capas	
1950	Kontrabando	Boss

=== Screenwriter ===
Year	Title
1955	Higit sa Lahat
