= José Nepomuceno =

Filipino film director and producer

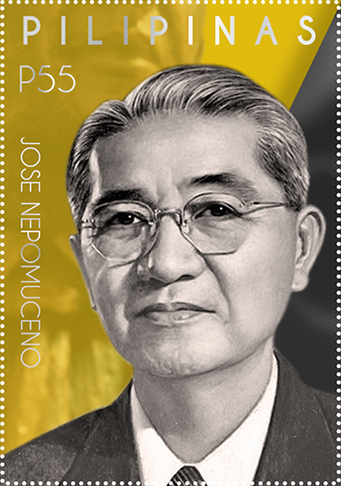
- Nepomuceno on a 2019 stamp of the Philippines
- Born: May 15, 1893; Manila, Captaincy General of the Philippines
- Died: December 1, 1959 (aged 66); Tuguegarao, Cagayan, Philippines
- Occupations: editor, photographer, filmmaker
- Spouse: Isabel Acuña
- Children: 8

José Nepomuceno y Zialcita (May 15, 1893 – December 1, 1959) was a Filipino filmmaker. A founding father of Philippine cinema, he is widely known for pioneering film directing and producing locally until the Second World War began. He had his own production company Jose Nepomuceno Productions, which produced the first Filipino silent film entitled Dalagang Bukid in 1919. The film starred Atang de la Rama, a future National Artist of the Philippines. He also directed Un (El) Capullo Marchito ("A Wilted Rosebud") in 1920. It starred Luisa Acuña, who then became a famous leading lady in Filipino silent films.

== Filmography ==
=== Director ===
- Dalagang Bukid ("Country Maiden") (1919)
- La Venganza de Don Silvestre (1920)
- Un Capullo Marchito (1920)
- Ang Tatlong Hambog ("The Three Humbugs") (1926)
- Ang Manananggal (1927)
- Hot Kisses (1927)
- The Filipino Woman (1927)
- Ang Lumang Simbahan ("The Old Church") (1928)
- The Pearl of the Markets (1929)
- Sa Landas ng Pag-ibig ("The Path of Love") (1929)
- Child Out of Wedlock (1930)
- Noli Me Tángere (1930)
- The Young Nun (1931)
- The Secret Pagan God (1931)
- Moro Pirates (1931)
- At Heaven's Gate (1932)
- Stray Flowers (1932)
- Tianak (1932)
- Makata at Paraluman (1933)
- Punyal na Guinto ("Golden Dagger") (1933)
- Sawing Palad (1934)
- Santong Diablo (1935)
- Anak ng Pare (1935)
- Kaban ng Tipan (1939)
- Biyak na Bato (1939)
- Mga Bituin ng Kinabukasan ("The Stars of Tomorrow") (1952)

=== Producer ===
- Ang Tatlong Hambog ("The Three Humbugs") (1926)
- La mujer Filipina (1927)
- Diwata ng Karagatan ("Spirit of the Ocean") (1936)

=== Writer ===
- Because of a Flower (1967)
- Ang Langit sa Lupa (1967)
