= List of Filipino actresses =

List of Filipino actresses is a list of present and past notable Filipino actresses on stage, television, and motion pictures, arranged in alphabetical order by first name.

== A ==
- AC Bonifacio (born 2002)
- Adrianna So (born 1992)
- África de la Rosa (1906–?)
- Agot Isidro (born 1966)
- Ahtisa Manalo (born 1997)
- Ai-Ai delas Alas (born 1964)
- Aicelle Santos (born 1985)
- Aiko Climaco (born 1989)
- Aiko Melendez (born 1975)
- Aira Bermudez (born 1983)
- Akiko Solon (born 1994)
- Aleck Bovick (born 1981)
- Alessandra De Rossi (born 1984)
- Alex Gonzaga (born 1988)
- Alexa Ilacad (born 2000)
- Alexei Abella (born 2002)
- Alice Dixson (born 1969)
- Alicia Alonzo (born 1946)
- Alicia Mayer (born 1976)
- Alicia Vergel (1927–1993)
- Alma Bella (1910–2012)
- Alma Moreno (born 1959)
- Alodia Gosiengfiao (born 1988)
- Alona Alegre (1948–2018)
- Althea Ablan (born 2004)
- Alyssa Alano (born 1987)
- Ama Quiambao (1947–2013)
- Amalia Fuentes (1940–2019)
- Amy Austria (born 1961)
- Amy Perez (born 1969)
- Ana Capri (born 1977)
- Ana Roces (born 1976)
- Analyn Barro (born 1996)
- Andi Abaya (born 2002)
- Andi Eigenmann (born 1990)
- Andrea Brillantes (born 2003)
- Andrea Del Rosario (born 1977)
- Andrea Torres (born 1990)
- Angel Aquino (born 1973)
- Angel Guardian (born 1998)
- Angel Locsin (born 1985)
- Angel Satsumi (born 2006)
- Angela Ken (born 2002)
- Angeli Bayani (born 1977)
- Angeli Gonzales (born 1994)
- Angeli Khang (born 2001)
- Angeli Nicole Sanoy (born 2001)
- Angelica Jones (born 1983)
- Angelica Panganiban (born 1986)
- Angelika Dela Cruz (born 1981)
- Angeline Quinto (born 1989)
- Angelu de Leon (born 1979)
- Angie Ferro (1937–2023)
- Anita Linda (1924–2020)
- Anja Aguilar (born 1994)
- Anji Salvacion (born 2002)
- Ann Li (born 1995)
- Anna Fegi (born 1977)
- Anna Marie Gutierrez (born 1964)
- Anna Larrucea (born 1984)
- Anna Luna (born 1993)
- Annabelle Huggins (born 1943)
- Annabelle Rama (born 1952)
- Anna Maria Perez de Tagle (born 1990)
- Anne Curtis (born 1985)
- Annicka Dolonius
- Annika Co (born 2016)
- Antoinette Taus (born 1981)
- Ar-Angel Aviles (born 2003)
- Ara Mina (born 1979)
- Arci Muñoz (born 1989)
- Aria Clemente (born 1995)
- Arianne Bautista (born 1993)
- Ariella Arida (born 1988)
- Aring Bautista (1920–?)
- Armida Siguion-Reyna (1930–2019)
- Arny Ross (born 1991)
- Arra San Agustin (born 1995)
- Aruray (1920–1988)
- Ashley Ortega (born 1998)
- Ashley Rivera (born 1992)
- Ashley Sarmiento (born 2007)
- Ashtine Olviga (born 1999)
- Asia Agcaoili (born 1977)
- Assunta de Rossi (born 1981)
- Atang dela Rama (1903–1991)
- Atasha Muhlach (born 2001)
- Ate Glow (born 1981)
- Athena (born 1988)
- Aubrey Caraan (born 1998)
- Aubrey Miles (born 1978)
- Aurora Sevilla (born 1963)
- Ayanna Oliva (born 1986)
- Ayen Munji-Laurel (born 1971)
- Ayra Mariano (born 1998)
- AZ Martinez (born 2003)

== B ==
- Bamba (born 1979)
- Bangs Garcia (born 1987)
- Barbara Miguel (born 2004)
- Barbara Perez (born 1938)
- Barbie Forteza (born 1997)
- Barbie Imperial (born 1998)
- BB Gandanghari (born 1967)
- Bea Alonzo (born 1987)
- Bea Binene (born 1997)
- Bea Nicolas (born 1994)
- Bea Rose Santiago (born 1990)
- Bea Saw (born 1985)
- Beatrice Gomez (born 1995)
- Beauty Gonzalez (born 1991)
- Bela Padilla (born 1991)
- Bella Flores (1929–2013)
- Belle Mariano (born 2002)
- Bettina Carlos (born 1987)
- Beverly Salviejo (born 1956)
- Beverly Vergel (born 1964)
- Bianca de Vera (born 2002)
- Bianca Gonzalez (born 1983)
- Bianca King (born 1985)
- Bianca Manalo (born 1987)
- Bianca Umali (born 2000)
- Bing Loyzaga (born 1970)
- Bituin Escalante (born 1977)
- Boots Anson-Roa (born 1945)
- Brenna Garcia (born 2004)
- Bubbles Paraiso (born 1988)

== C ==
- Cai Cortez (born 1988)
- Camille Prats (born 1985)
- Camille Villar (born 1985)
- Candy Pangilinan (born 1972)
- Caprice Cayetano (born 2008)
- Caridad Sanchez (born 1936)
- Carina Afable (born 1942)
- Carla Abellana (born 1986)
- Carla Guevara Laforteza (born 1975)
- Carla Humphries (born 1988)
- Carlene Aguilar (born 1982)
- Carmen LoBue
- Carmen Rosales (1917–1991)
- Carmen Soriano (born 1940)
- Carmencita Abad (born 1933)
- Carmi Martin (born 1963)
- Carmina Villarroel (born 1975)
- Carol Banawa (born 1981)
- Cassandra Ponti (born 1982)
- Cassy Legaspi (born 2001)
- Catriona Gray (born 1994)
- Celeste Cortesi (born 1997)
- Celeste Legaspi (born 1950)
- Celia Rodriguez (born 1934)
- Ces Quesada (born 1958)
- Chacha Cañete (born 2004)
- Chai Fonacier (born 1986)
- Chanda Romero (born 1954)
- Chanty Videla (born 2002)
- Charee Pineda (born 1990)
- Charito de Leon (born 1939)
- Charito Solis (1935–1998)
- Chariz Solomon (born 1989)
- Charlene Gonzales (born 1974)
- Charlie Dizon (born 1996)
- Charlie Fleming (born 2008)
- Charo Santos-Concio (born 1955)
- Chat Silayan (1959–2006)
- Che Ramos (born 1980)
- Chelsea Manalo (born 1999)
- Cherie Gil (1963–2022)
- Cherry Lou (born 1982)
- Cherry Pie Picache (born 1970)
- Cheska Garcia (born 1980)
- Chichay (1918–1993)
- Chin Chin Gutierrez (born 1969)
- Chlaui Malayao (born 2008)
- Christine Jacob (born 1967)
- Chx Alcala (born 1981)
- Chynna Ortaleza (born 1982)
- Cianne Dominguez (born 2001)
- Ciara Sotto (born 1980)
- Cielito del Mundo (1935–2016)
- Cindy Kurleto (born 1979)
- Cindy Miranda (born 1990)
- Claire dela Fuente (1958–2021)
- Claire Ruiz (born 1997)
- Claudia Zobel (1965–1984)
- Claudine Barretto (born 1979)
- Coleen Garcia (born 1992)
- Coleen Perez (born 1995)
- Coney Reyes (born 1953)
- Cora Waddell (born 1989)
- Cris Villonco (born 1983)
- Cristina Aragon (born 1932)
- Cristina Gonzales (born 1970)
- Cristine Reyes (born 1989)
- Cynthia Zamora (1938–2019)

== D ==
- Daiana Menezes (born 1987)
- Daisy Avellana (1917–2013)
- Daisy Reyes
- Daisy Romualdez
- Daniela Stranner (born 2002)
- Danita Paner (born 1989)
- Dasuri Choi (born 1988)
- Dawn Zulueta (born 1969)
- Delia Razon (1930–2025)
- Dely Atay-Atayan (1914–2004)
- Denise Barbacena (born 1994)
- Denise Joaquin
- Denise Laurel (born 1987)
- Desiree del Valle (born 1982)
- Devon Seron (born 1993)
- Dexter Doria (born 1955)
- Diana Mackey
- Diana Zubiri (born 1985)
- Dianne dela Fuente (born 1981)
- Dianne Medina (born 1986)
- Didith Reyes (1949–2008)
- Dimples Cooper (1914–1960)
- Dimples Romana (born 1984)
- Dina Bonnevie (born 1962)
- Dionne Monsanto (born 1985)
- Diva Montelaba (born 1991)
- Dolly de Leon (born 1969)
- Donita Nose (born 1979)
- Donita Rose (born 1974)
- Donna Cariaga (born 1994)
- Donna Cruz (born 1977)
- Donna Villa
- Dulce (born 1961)

== E ==
- Eda Nolan (born 1988)
- Elaine Duran (born 1998)
- Elena Jurado (1901–1974)
- Elha Nympha (born 2004)
- Elia Ilano (born 2010)
- Elijah Alejo (born 2004)
- Elise Estrada (born 1987)
- Elisse Joson (born 1996)
- Eliza Pineda (born 1995)
- Elizabeth Cooper (1914–1960)
- Elizabeth Oropesa (born 1954)
- Elizabeth Ramsey (1931–2015)
- Ella Cruz (born 1996)
- Ella Guevara (born 1998)
- Elle Ramirez (born 1991)
- Elle Villanueva (born 1996)
- Ellen Adarna (born 1988)
- Elvira Manahan (1927–1986)
- Emma Alegre (born 1935)
- Emma Henry (?–1986)
- Emma Tiglao (born 1994)
- Emmanuelle Vera (born 1994)
- Empress Schuck (born 1993)
- Erich Gonzales (born 1990)
- Erika Padilla (born 1986)
- Erin Ocampo (born 1996)
- Erlinda Cortes (1924–2015)
- Esang de Torres (born 2007)
- Etang Discher (1906–1981)
- Ethel Booba (born 1976)
- Eugene Domingo (born 1971)
- Eula Caballero (born 1995)
- Eula Valdez (born 1968)
- Eunice Lagusad (born 1998)
- Eva Castillo (1969–2022)
- Eva Darren (born 1946)
- Eva Eugenio
- Evangeline Pascual (born 1956)

== F ==
- Faith da Silva (born 2001)
- Faye Lorenzo (born 1996)
- Flora Gasser (1932–2022)
- Frances Makil-Ignacio (born 1971)
- Francesca Taruc (born 1998)
- Franchesca Salcedo (born 2002)
- Francine Diaz (born 2004)
- Francine Prieto (born 1981)
- Frencheska Farr (born 1992)
- Fyang Smith (born 2006)

== G ==
- G. Toengi (born 1978)
- Gab Pangilinan (born 1991)
- Gabb Skribikin (born 2002)
- Gabbi Garcia (born 1998)
- Gabby Padilla
- Gaby dela Merced (born 1982)
- Gazini Ganados (born 1995)
- Gee-Ann Abrahan (born 1985)
- Gelli de Belen (born 1973)
- Gem Ramos (born 1978)
- Geneva Cruz (born 1976)
- Georgina Wilson (born 1986)
- Gigi de Lana (born 1995)
- Gina Alajar (born 1959)
- Gina Pareño (born 1947)
- Gladys Guevarra (born 1977)
- Gladys Reyes (born 1978)
- Glaiza de Castro (born 1988)
- Glaiza Herradura (born 1978)
- Gloria Diaz (born 1951)
- Gloria Romero (1933–2025)
- Gloria Sevilla (1932–2022)
- Glydel Mercado (born 1975)
- Golden Cañedo (born 2002)
- Grace Lee (born 1982)
- Gretchen Barretto (born 1970)
- Gretchen Espina (born 1988)
- Guila Alvarez (born 1980)
- Gwen Garci (born 1981)
- Gwen Zamora (born 1990)
- Gwendoline Ruais (born 1989)

== H ==
- Halina Perez (1981–2004)
- Harlene Bautista (born 1973)
- Hazel Ann Mendoza (born 1988)
- Hazel Orencio (born 1986)
- Heart Evangelista (born 1985)
- Heaven Peralejo (born 1999)
- Helen Gamboa (born 1945)
- Helen Vela (1946–1992)
- Helga Krapf (born 1988)
- Herlene Budol (born 1999)
- Hilda Koronel (born 1957)
- Hiyasmin Neri (born 1990)
- Hyacinth Callado (born 2003)

== I ==
- Ian Galliguez (born 1975)
- Iana Bernardez (born 1993)
- Ice Seguerra (born 1983)
- Imee Marcos (born 1955)
- Imelda Papin (born 1956)
- Imelda Schweighart (born 1995)
- Ina Feleo (born 1985)
- Ina Raymundo (born 1975)
- Inday Badiday (1944–2003)
- Ingrid dela Paz (born 1994)
- Irma Adlawan (born 1962)
- Isabel Blaesi (born 1990)
- Isabel Granada (1976–2017)
- Isabel Oli (born 1981)
- Isabel Rivas (born 1958)
- Isabel Sandoval (born 1982)
- Isabelle de Leon (born 1994)
- Isabelle Daza (born 1988)
- Ivana Alawi (born 1996)
- Iwa Moto (born 1988)
- Iya Villania (born 1986)
- Iyah Mina (born 1976)
- Iza Calzado (born 1982)

== J ==
- Jackie Lou Blanco (born 1964)
- Jackie Gonzaga (born 1994)
- Jackie Rice (born 1990)
- Jaclyn Jose (1963–2024)
- Jade Ecleo (born 1970)
- Jade Lopez (born 1987)
- Jamie Rivera (born 1966)
- Jan Marini (born 1978)
- Jana Roxas (born 1990)
- Jane de Leon (born 1998)
- Jane Oineza (born 1996)
- Janella Salvador (born 1998)
- Janelle Jamer (born 1984)
- Janelle Quintana (born 1989)
- Janette McBride (born 1983)
- Janice de Belen (born 1968)
- Janina San Miguel (born 1990)
- Janine Berdin (born 2002)
- Janine Gutierrez (born 1989)
- Janine Tugonon (born 1989)
- Janna Dominguez (born 1990)
- January Isaac (born 1976)
- Jasmine Curtis-Smith (born 1994)
- Jaya Ramsey (born 1969)
- Jayda Avanzado (born 2003)
- Jaymee Joaquin (born 1979)
- Jazz Ocampo (born 1997)
- JC Parker (born 1985)
- Jean Garcia (born 1969)
- Jed Montero (born 1988)
- Jef Gaitan (born 1989)
- Jelai Andres (born 1991)
- Jennica Garcia (born 1989)
- Jennie Gabriel (born 1987)
- Jennifer Sevilla (born 1974)
- Jenny Miller (born 1980)
- Jenny Syquia (born 1967)
- Jennylyn Mercado (born 1987)
- Jessa Zaragoza (born 1978)
- Jessy Mendiola (born 1992)
- Jewel Mische (born 1990)
- Jhoana Marie Tan (born 1993)
- Jhoanna Robles (born 2004)
- Jill Yulo (born 1989)
- Jillian Ward (born 2005)
- Jinri Park (born 1988)
- Jo Berry (born 1994)
- Joanna Bacalso
- Joanne Quintas (born 1976)
- Jocelyn Oxlade (born 1984)
- Jodi Sta. Maria (born 1982)
- Jolina Magdangal (born 1978)
- Jonalyn Viray (born 1989)
- Jopay (born 1983)
- Jorrybell Agoto (1994–2026)
- Joy Bisco (born 1975)
- Joy Viado (1959–2016)
- Joyce Ching (born 1995)
- Joyce Jimenez (born 1978)
- Juanita Angeles (1900–after 1942)
- Judy Ann Santos (born 1978)
- Julia Barretto (born 1997)
- Julia Clarete (born 1979)
- Julia Montes (born 1995)
- Julie Anne San Jose (born 1994)
- Julie Vega (1968–1985)
- Justina David (1912–?)
- Juvy Cachola (born 1956)

== K ==
- K Brosas (born 1975)
- Kai Montinola (born 2006)
- Kaila Estrada (born 1996)
- Kakai Bautista (born 1978)
- KaladKaren (born 1992)
- Kaori Oinuma (born 2000)
- Karel Marquez (born 1986)
- Karen Bordador (born 1992)
- Karen delos Reyes (born 1984)
- Karen Reyes (born 1996)
- Karina Bautista (born 2002)
- Karla Estrada (born 1974)
- Karylle (born 1981)
- Kat Alano (born 1985)
- Kate Valdez (born 2000)
- Kathleen Hermosa (born 1993)
- Kathryn Bernardo (born 1996)
- Katrina Halili (born 1986)
- Katrina Velarde (born 1994)
- Katy de la Cruz (1907–2004)
- Katya Santos (born 1982)
- Kaye Abad (born 1982)
- Kazel Kinouchi (born 1991)
- KC Concepcion (born 1985)
- Keanna Reeves (born 1967)
- Kiara Takahashi (born 1997)
- Kim Adis (born 1993)
- Kim Chiu (born 1990)
- Kim delos Santos (born 1981)
- Kim Domingo (born 1995)
- Kim Molina (born 1991)
- Kim Rodriguez (born 1994)
- Kira Balinger (born 2000)
- Kiray Celis (born 1995)
- Kisses Delavin (born 1999)
- Kitchie Nadal (born 1980)
- Kitkat (born 1984)
- Klarisse de Guzman (born 1991)
- Klaudia Koronel (born 1975)
- Klea Pineda (born 1999)
- Koreen Medina (born 1995)
- Kriesha Chu (born 1998)
- Kris Aquino (born 1971)
- Kris Bernal (born 1989)
- Krissha Viaje (born 1992)
- Krista K (born 1989)
- Krista Ranillo (born 1984)
- Kristel Fulgar (born 1994)
- Kristel Moreno (born 1991)
- Kristine Hermosa (born 1983)
- Krizza Neri (born 1995)
- Krystal Reyes (born 1996)
- Kuh Ledesma (born 1955)
- Kyla Alvarez (born 1981)
- Kylie Padilla (born 1993)
- Kylie Verzosa (born 1992)
- Kyline Alcantara (born 2002)
- KZ Tandingan (born 1992)

== L ==
- Lady Lee (born 1986)
- Lana Jalosjos
- Lani Mercado (born 1968)
- Lani Misalucha (born 1969)
- Lauren King (born 2007)
- Lauren Reid (born 1993)
- Lauren Young (born 1993)
- Laurice Guillen (born 1947)
- Lea Salonga (born 1971)
- Leanne Bautista (born 2010)
- Letty Alonzo (1929–2020)
- Lexi Fernandez (born 1995)
- Lexi Gonzales (born 2000)
- Lianne Valentin (born 2001)
- Lie Reposposa (born 2003)
- Liezel Lopez (born 1997)
- Liezl Martinez (1967–2015)
- Lilet (born 1977)
- Lilia Cuntapay (1935–2016)
- Lilia Dizon (1928–2020)
- Lilian Velez (1924–1948)
- Linda Estrella (1926–2012)
- Lindsay Custodio (born 1978)
- Liz Alindogan (born 1963)
- Liza Diño (born 1981)
- Liza Lapira (born 1981)
- Liza Lorena (born 1948)
- Liza Soberano (born 1998)
- LJ Reyes (born 1987)
- Loisa Andalio (born 1999)
- Lolit Solis (1947–2025)
- Lolita Rodriguez (1935–2016)
- Lorna Tolentino (born 1961)
- Lorraine Schuck
- Lota Delgado (1918–2009)
- Lotis Key
- Lotlot de Leon (born 1971)
- Lou Yanong (born 1997)
- Lougee Basabas (born 1984)
- Louise delos Reyes (born 1993)
- Lovely Abella (born 1985)
- Lovely Rivero (born 1969)
- Lovi Poe (born 1989)
- Luane Dy (born 1986)
- Lucita Soriano (1941–2015)
- Lucy Torres (born 1974)
- Luz Fernandez (1935–2022)
- Luz Valdez (born 1940)
- Lyca Gairanod (born 2004)

== M ==
- Madam Auring (1940–2020)
- Mae Paner
- Maey Bautista (born 1972)
- Maggie de la Riva (born 1942)
- Mahal (1974–2021)
- Maika Rivera (born 1995)
- Maine Mendoza (born 1995)
- Maita Sanchez (born 1969)
- Maja Salvador (born 1988)
- Malou de Guzman (born 1958)
- Malu Maglutac (born 1960)
- Manilyn Reynes (born 1972)
- Mara Lopez (born 1991)
- Margaret Nales Wilson (born 1989)
- Margie Moran (born 1953)
- Maria Amapola Cabase (born 1948)
- Maria Isabel Lopez (born 1957)
- Maria Teresa Carlson (1963–2001)
- Marian Rivera (born 1984)
- Marianne dela Riva
- Maricar de Mesa (born 1979)
- Maricar Reyes (born 1984)
- Maricel Laxa (born 1970)
- Maricel Morales (born 1976)
- Maricel Soriano (born 1965)
- Maricris Garcia (born 1987)
- Mariel Pamintuan (born 1998)
- Mariel Rodriguez (born 1984)
- Marife Necesito (born 1980)
- Marilyn Villamayor
- Marion Aunor (born 1992)
- Maris Racal (born 1997)
- Marissa Delgado (born 1951)
- Marissa Sanchez (born 1970)
- Marita Zobel (born 1941)
- Maritoni Fernandez (born 1969)
- Marjorie Barretto (born 1974)
- Marla Boyd (born 1987)
- Marlann Flores (born 1993)
- Marlene Dauden (born 1941)
- Marvelous Alejo (born 1996)
- Mary Jean Lastimosa (born 1987)
- Mary Walter (1912–1993)
- Matet de Leon (born 1982)
- Matimtiman Cruz (1919–1992)
- Matutina (1946–2025)
- Maui Taylor (born 1981)
- Maureen Francisco
- Maureen Larrazabal (born 1979)
- Maureen Wroblewitz (born 1998)
- Max Collins (born 1992)
- Max Eigenmann (born 1987)
- Maxene Magalona (born 1986)
- Maxine Medina (born 1990)
- Maybelyn dela Cruz (born 1982)
- Maymay Entrata (born 1997)
- Mayton Eugenio (born 1987)
- Meg Imperial (born 1993)
- Megan Young (born 1990)
- Melai Cantiveros (born 1988)
- Melanie Marquez (born 1964)
- Melissa Mendez (born 1964)
- Melissa Ricks (born 1990)
- Melizza Jimenez (born 2000)
- Mely Tagasa (1935–2018)
- Mercedes Cabral (born 1986)
- Meryll Soriano (born 1982)
- Metring David (1920–2010)
- Mica Javier (born 1993)
- Mich Dulce (born 1981)
- Michelle Dee (born 1995)
- Michelle van Eimeren (born 1972)
- Michelle Madrigal (born 1987)
- Mickey Ferriols (born 1973)
- Miho Nishida (born 1992)
- Mika dela Cruz (born 1998)
- Mika Salamanca (born 2000)
- Mikee Cojuangco-Jaworski (born 1974)
- Mikee Quintos (born 1997)
- Mikha Lim (born 2003)
- Mila del Sol (1923–2020)
- Miles Ocampo (born 1997)
- Mimi Miyagi (born 1973)
- Miriam Quiambao (born 1975)
- Mocha Uson (born 1978)
- Moira Dela Torre (born 1993)
- Mona Lisa (1922–2019)
- Mona Louise Rey (born 2004)
- Monang Carvajal (1898–1980)
- Monica Cuenco (born 1994)
- Monique Wilson (born 1970)
- Morissette (born 1996)
- Mosang (born 1972)
- Mutya Johanna Datul (born 1992)
- Mutya Orquia (born 2006)
- Mylene Dizon (born 1976)
- Myrtle Sarrosa (born 1994)

== N ==
- Nadine Lustre (born 1993)
- Nadine Samonte (born 1988)
- Nancy Castiglione (born 1981)
- Nanette Inventor (born 1954)
- Nanette Medved (born 1971)
- Nathalie Hart (born 1992)
- Naty Bernardo (1911–1987)
- Nela Alvarez (1919–2009)
- Nena Cardenas (1932–2020)
- Nene Tamayo (born 1981)
- Neri Naig (born 1983)
- Nicole Laurel Asensio (born 1986)
- Nicole Kim Donesa (born 1994)
- Nicole Dulalia (born 1997)
- Nicole Uysiuseng (born 1990)
- Nida Blanca (1936–2001)
- Nikka Valencia (born 1976)
- Nikki Bacolod (born 1989)
- Nikki Gil (born 1987)
- Nikki Samonte (born 2000)
- Nikki Valdez (born 1981)
- Nina Girado (born 1980)
- Nina Kodaka (born 1989)
- Niña Dolino (born 1982)
- Niña Jose (born 1988)
- Nita Javier (1941/42 – April 6, 2012)
- Noemi Oineza (born 1999)
- Nora Aunor (1953–2025)
- Nori Dalisay (born 1938)
- Nova Villa (born 1946)

== O ==
- Olive May (born 2004)
- Olivia Cenizal (1926–2008)

== P ==
- Pacita del Rio (1921–1989)
- Pamu Pamorada (born 1992)
- Paraluman (1923–2009)
- Patani Daño
- Patricia Fernandez (born 1985)
- Patricia Javier (born 1979)
- Patricia Tumulak (born 1988)
- Paula Peralejo (born 1984)
- Pauleen Luna (born 1988)
- Pauline Mendoza (born 1999)
- Paw Diaz (born 1987)
- Pepsi Paloma (1966–1985)
- Perla Bautista (born 1940)
- Phoemela Barranda (born 1980)
- Pia Guanio (born 1974)
- Pia Moran
- Pia Wurtzbach (born 1989)
- Pilar Pilapil (born 1950)
- Pilita Corrales (1939–2025)
- Pinky Amador (born 1966)
- Pokwang (born 1972)
- Pops Fernandez (born 1966)
- Precious Lara Quigaman (born 1983)
- Princess Guevarra (born 1999)
- Princess Punzalan (born 1963)
- Princess Ryan (born 1989)
- Princess Schuck (born 1987)
- Priscilla Cellona
- Priscilla Meirelles (born 1983)

== Q ==
- Queenierich Rehman (born 1992)

== R ==
- Rabiya Mateo (born 1996)
- Rachel Alejandro (born 1974)
- Rachel Grant (born 1977)
- Rachel Peters (born 1991)
- Rachelle Ann Go (born 1986)
- Radha Cuadrado (born 1976)
- Rans Rifol (born 2001)
- Raquel Monteza (born 1955)
- Raven Villanueva (born 1976)
- Rebecca del Rio (1929–2010)
- Rebecca Lusterio (born 1989)
- Regine Angeles (born 1985)
- Regine Tolentino (born 1980)
- Regine Velasquez (born 1970)
- Reign Parani (born 2003)
- Rhed Bustamante (born 2005)
- Rhian Ramos (born 1990)
- Ria Atayde (born 1992)
- Rica Peralejo (born 1981)
- Rich Asuncion (born 1989)
- Rio Diaz (1959–2004)
- Rio Locsin (born 1961)
- Rita Avila (born 1968)
- Rita Daniela (born 1995)
- Rita Gomez (1935–1990)
- Ritz Azul (born 1994)
- Riza Santos (born 1987)
- Rochelle Pangilinan (born 1982)
- Rosa Aguirre (1908–1981)
- Rosa del Rosario (1917–2006)
- Rosa Mia (1925–2006)
- Rosa Rosal (1931–2025)
- Rosanna Roces (born 1972)
- Rose Ann Gonzales
- Roselle Nava (born 1976)
- Rosemarie Gil (born 1942)
- Rosemarie Sonora (born 1948)
- Rox Montealegre (born 1990)
- Roxanne Barcelo (born 1985)
- Roxanne Guinoo (born 1986)
- Roxie Smith (born 1997)
- RR Enriquez (born 1985)
- Rubi Rubi (born 1966)
- Ruby Moreno (born 1965)
- Ruby Rodriguez (born 1966)
- Rufa Mae Quinto (born 1978)
- Rufa Mi (born 1988)
- Ruffa Gutierrez (born 1974)
- Rustica Carpio (1930–2022)
- Ryza Cenon (born 1987)
- Ryzza Mae Dizon (born 2005)

== S ==
- Saab Magalona (born 1988)
- Sabrina Man (born 2000)
- Salome Salvi
- Sam Bumatay (born 1999)
- Sam Pinto (born 1989)
- Samantha Richelle (born 1988)
- Sandara Park (born 1984)
- Sandy Andolong (born 1959)
- Sandy Talag (born 1998)
- Sanya Lopez (born 1996)
- Sarah Jane Abad (born 1986)
- Sarah Christophers (born 1986)
- Sarah Geronimo (born 1988)
- Sarah Lahbati (born 1993)
- Sarita Pérez de Tagle (born 1986)
- Sarsi Emmanuelle (born 1965)
- Say Alonzo (born 1983)
- Scarlet Garcia (1985–2008)
- Sela Guia (born 2000)
- Serena Dalrymple (born 1990)
- Shaina Magdayao (born 1989)
- Shaira Diaz (born 1995)
- Shamaine Buencamino (born 1965)
- Shamcey Supsup (born 1986)
- Shanaia Gomez (born 2002)
- Sharlene San Pedro (born 1999)
- Sharmaine Arnaiz (born 1974)
- Sharon Cuneta (born 1966)
- Sheena Belarmino (born 2005)
- Sheena Catacutan (born 2004)
- Sheena Halili (born 1987)
- Sheree Bautista (born 1986)
- Sherilyn Reyes-Tan (born 1975)
- Shermaine Santiago (born 1980)
- Sheryl Cruz (born 1974)
- Sheryn Regis (born 1980)
- Shey Bustamante (born 1993)
- Shuvee Etrata (born 2001)
- Shy Carlos (born 1995)
- Skye Chua (born 2003)
- Snooky Serna (born 1966)
- Sofia Andres (born 1998)
- Sofia Moran (born 1945)
- Sofia Pablo (born 2006)
- Solenn Heussaff (born 1985)
- Sophia Montecarlo (born 1986)
- Sophia Reola (born 2008)
- Sophie Albert (born 1990)
- Stacey Gabriel (born 1997)
- Stef Prescott (born 1991)
- Stella Ruiz White (born 1975)
- Stephanie Sol (born 1990)
- Sue Prado (1981–2026)
- Sue Ramirez (born 1996)
- Sugar Mercado (born 1986)
- Sunshine Cruz (born 1977)
- Sunshine Dizon (born 1983)
- Susan Africa (born 1959)
- Susan Roces (1941–2022)
- Suzette Ranillo (born 1961)
- Sylvia La Torre (1933–2022)
- Sylvia Sanchez (born 1971)

== T ==
- Taki Saito (born 2000)
- Tanya Garcia (born 1981)
- Tessie Agana (born 1943)
- Tessie Tomas (born 1950)
- Tetchie Agbayani (born 1961)
- Thea Astley (born 2000)
- Thea Tolentino (born 1996)
- Therese Malvar (born 2000)
- Thia Thomalla (born 1995)
- Timmy Cruz (born 1966)
- Tin Patrimonio (born 1991)
- Tina Paner (born 1971)
- Tippy Dos Santos (born 1994)
- Tisha Custodio
- Tita de Villa (1931–2014)
- Tita Duran (1929–1991)
- Tita Muñoz (1927–2009)
- Tiya Pusit (1948–2014)
- Toni Fowler (born 1993)
- Toni Gonzaga (born 1984)
- Toni Rose Gayda (born 1958)
- Tootsie Guevara (born 1980)
- Tricia Santos (born 1995)
- Tuesday Vargas (born 1979)

== V ==
- Valeen Montenegro (born 1990)
- Valerie Concepcion (born 1981)
- Valerie Weigmann (born 1989)
- Vaness del Moral (born 1988)
- Vangie Labalan (1943-2026)
- Venus Raj (born 1988)
- Vernie Varga (born 1958)
- Vicki Belo (born 1956)
- Vickie Rushton (born 1992)
- Vicky Vega (born 1966)
- Vilma Santos (born 1953)
- Vina Morales (born 1975)
- Viveika Ravanes (born 1975)
- Vivian Velez (born 1960)
- Vivoree Esclito (born 2000)

== W ==
- Wendy Valdez (born 1982)
- Whitney Tyson
- Winnie Cordero (born 1966)
- Winwyn Marquez (born 1992)

== X ==
- Xia Vigor (born 2009)
- Xyriel Manabat (born 2004)

== Y ==
- Yam Concepcion (born 1989)
- Yasmien Kurdi (born 1989)
- Yassi Pressman (born 1995)
- Yayo Aguila (born 1967)
- Yen Santos (born 1992)
- Yeng Constantino (born 1988)
- Ylona Garcia (born 2002)
- Ynna Asistio (born 1991)
- Ysabel Ortega (born 1999)

== Z ==
- Zandra Summer (born 1994)
- Zeny Zabala (1934–2017)
- Zephanie Dimaranan (born 2003)
- Zeryl Lim (born 1987)
- Zia Marquez (born 1992)
- Zia Quizon (born 1991)
- Zorayda Sanchez (1951–2008)
- Zsa Zsa Padilla (born 1964)

== See also ==
- List of current child actors from the Philippines
- List of former child actors from the Philippines
