= Hamamura =

Hamamura (written: 浜村) is a Japanese surname. Notable people with the surname include:

- Hideo Hamamura (浜村 秀雄, 1928–2000), Japanese marathon runner
- Hirokazu Hamamura (浜村 弘一, born 1961), Japanese businessman
- Jun Hamamura (浜村 純, 1906–1995), Japanese actor
- Michiko Hamamura (浜村 美智子, born 1938), Japanese singer and actress
- Natsumi Hamamura (浜村 夏美, born 1984), Japanese tennis player
- Susumu Hamamura (濱村 進, born 1975), Japanese politician

== See also ==
- Hamamura Station, a railway station in Tottori Prefecture, Japan.
