= Waray-Waray =

Waray-Waray may refer to:

- Waray people, of the Philippines
- Waray language, their Austronesian language
- Waray-Waray gangs, gangs in the country of the above ethnicity
- Waray-Waray (song), a folk-pop Filipino song

== See also ==
- Waray (disambiguation)
