= Bahaghari =

1940 Filipino film directed by Don Dano

- Directed by: Don Dano
- Release date: 1940
- Country: Philippines
- Languages: Filipino, Tagalog

Bahaghari is a 1940 Filipino film directed by Don Dano. It stars Rosa Aguirre, Miguel Anzures and Narding Anzures.
