= Nukso nang Nukso =

1960 Philippine comedy film

- Theatrical release poster
- Directed by: Fred Daluz
- Written by: Virgilio "Beer" Flores
- Produced by: Narcisa de Leon
- Starring: Pugo; Bentot; Sylvia La Torre; Eddie San Jose; Rosa Aguirre; Nelda Lopez Navarro; Val Castelo; Merle Tuazon
- Cinematography: Enrique Rosales; Exequiel 'Jojo' Sangco
- Edited by: Fred Buensuceso
- Music by: Leopoldo Silos as Polding Silos
- Production company: LVN Pictures
- Distributed by: LVN Pictures
- Release date: 26 October 1960
- Running time: 118 minutes
- Country: Philippines
- Language: Filipino

Nukso nang Nukso is a 1960 Philippine comedy film directed by Fred Daluz from a story and screenplay written by Virgilio "Beer" Flores. The film stars Pugo and Bentot, Sylvia La Torre, Eddie San Jose, Rosa Aguirre, Nelda Lopez Navarro, Val Castelo, and Merle Tuazon. The film is adapted from the radio series Sebya, Mahal Kita. It was released in the Philippines on 26 October 1960 and was among the final productions released by LVN Pictures before the studio ceased regular film production on 31 May 1961.

The film centers on Mang Nano Batekabesa, a crafty but affable swindler played by Pugo, who devises various schemes to support his gambling and cockfighting habits. His son Bitoy, portrayed by Bentot, frequently exposes these schemes, creating conflicts with their neighbors and relatives. Sylvia La Torre plays Sebya, Mang Nano's daughter, whose singing ability forms part of the film's comic and musical elements.

== Cast ==
=== Main Cast ===
- Pugo as Mariano “Nano” Batekabesa
- Bentot as Bitoy
- Sylvia La Torre as Sebya
- Eddie San Jose as Eduardo “Eddie” Biscocho
- Rosa Aguirre as Aling Rosa
- Nelda Lopez Navarro as Aling Barang
- Merle Tuazon as Merle
- Val Castelo as Berting

=== Supporting Cast ===
- Ric Tierro
- Dely Magpayo
- Gwendolyn as 'Rosemarie'
- Miniong Alvarez
- Gerry Gabaldon
- Vicente Alberto
- Horace Curry
- Angel Confiado
- Vicente Cabrera
- Carlos Roldan
- Manuel Brioso

== Plot ==
Mang Nano, a financially struggling plumber, faces difficulty finding work and increasingly resorts to dishonest schemes in an attempt to earn money. His actions damage his reputation among his neighbors, friends, and family, including his daughter Sebya and son Bitoy. Among his schemes is the deliberate vandalism of cemetery tombs, which he hopes will create repair work for himself. However, the plan fails when the damaged tombs are repaired using a newly developed, highly durable cement invented by Merle, a wealthy family friend of Eddie, Sebya's husband.

During a public demonstration of Merle's cement at the cemetery, Bitoy is mistakenly believed to have been trapped inside a sealed tomb. Mang Nano accepts financial compensation from Merle after assuming his son has died, but the arrangement collapses when Bitoy is later revealed to be alive, having left the tomb before it was sealed. The incident further damages Mang Nano's credibility.

Mang Nano later deceives Eddie into giving him money by pretending to suffer from a heart condition, using the funds to place bets on the illegal numbers game jueteng. The scheme strains Eddie's finances and eventually comes to light when Bitoy inadvertently reveals the truth to Sebya and Aling Rosa. In another attempt to influence his family's affairs, Mang Nano convinces Eddie to pretend to have a mistress in order to gain leverage in his marriage. The plan escalates when Mang Nano disguises himself as a woman named "Remy" and poses as Eddie's alleged lover. The deception unravels after a local thief falls in love with "Remy," and Bitoy publicly reveals his father's true identity at an engagement party, causing further embarrassment.

When a committee is formed to help expand the operations of a rural savings bank owned by Merle's family, Mang Nano volunteers to participate. However, his poor reputation leads most attendees to oppose his inclusion, prompting him to leave the meeting humiliated. Later, while visiting his late wife's grave and contemplating leaving the community, he accidentally overhears a group of criminals planning to rob the bank through a tunnel connected to a cemetery tomb. The plot is led by a trusted employee of the bank who is also favored by Merle's father as her prospective husband.

Mang Nano reports the conspiracy to Berting, a police officer and family friend. On the day of the planned robbery, Mang Nano, Berting, and Eddie monitor the suspects and alert others when the crime begins. After the robbers take Merle's father hostage and escape through the tunnel, the group pursues them to the cemetery. There, Mang Nano, Berting, and Eddie help subdue the criminals as they emerge from the tunnel, leading to their arrest.

During the confrontation, Eddie and Sebya's daughter Gwendolyn accidentally picks up dynamite intended for the robbery. Mang Nano attempts to save those nearby by throwing it into a river, but falls into the water before the explosives detonate. Believed to have died in the explosion, he is honored with a memorial tomb bearing the title "Hero of Caloocan." He later reappears alive, covered in mud after surviving the blast. Although initially unrecognized, he is identified by Bitoy, who expresses pride in his father. The townspeople subsequently celebrate Mang Nano as a hero for his role in foiling the robbery. The film also implies that Berting will receive a promotion as a result of his participation in the arrest of the robbers.

== Release ==
The film was released in the Philippines on 26 October 1960 and was among the final productions released by LVN Pictures before the studio ceased regular film production on 31 May 1961.

In 2010, during the 6th Cinemalaya Independent Film Festival held between July 9 to 18, 2010 at the Cultural Center of the Philippines Complex in Metro Manila, Cinemalaya paid tribute to LVN Pictures with a retrospective of LVN films, in which Nukso nang Nukso was one of the films shown.

== Restoration ==
Nukso nang Nukso film poster for the 2024 restored version release (©Jexy Reyes)

On 2 December 2024, the scanned and enhanced version of the film premiered at the UPFI Film Center. ABS-CBN Sagip Pelikula, Narra Post-Production Studios by Wildsound, and UPFI Film Center initiated the project with the restoration included scans by Marco Jerome Gatpandan, image enhancement by Mik Pestaño, and audio restoration by Albert Michael Idioma. New posters for the premiere were also released.

== Legacy ==
Nukso nang Nukso remains notable as one of the surviving comedy productions of LVN Pictures and as a screen collaboration between Pugo, Bentot, and Sylvia La Torre. The film also serves as a record of the popular radio and comedy traditions that influenced Philippine studio-era filmmaking.
