= Magbalik Ka, Hirang =

Magbalik ka, Hirang
- Directed by: Lorenzo P. Tuells
- Release date: 1940
- Country: Philippines
- Language: Tagalog

Magbalik ka, Hirang is a 1940 Filipino film directed by Lorenzo P. Tuells. It stars Rosa Aguirre, Nemesio E. Caravana and Justina David.
