= Sylvia La Torre =

Filipino singer and actress (1933–2022)

- La Torre in 1960
- Born: Sylvia Reyes La Torre; June 4, 1933; Manila, Philippine Islands
- Died: December 1, 2022 (aged 89); Los Angeles, California, U.S.
- Other names: Ibyang; Queen of Kundiman; The First Lady of Philippine Television
- Occupations: Singer • recording artist • film, stage and TV actress • TV host • radio personality • commercial talent
- Years active: 1941–2022
- Known for: Co-host of Oras ng Ligaya; Kundiman performer
- Spouse: Celso Perez de Tagle
- Children: 3
- Parents: Olive La Torre (father); Leonora Reyes (mother)
- Relatives: Anna Maria Perez de Tagle (granddaughter); Sarita Pérez de Tagle (granddaughter)
- Musical career
- Genres: Kundiman; Philippine folk music Original Pilipino Music
- Instrument: Vocals
- Labels: Villar Records; Plaka Pilipino
- Awards: 1997: Ading Fernando Lifetime Achievement Award - PMPC Star Awards for Television; 2017: Excellence in Music Award - Filipino-American Symphony Orchestra

Sylvia Reyes La Torre-Perez de Tagle (June 4, 1933 – December 1, 2022) was a Filipino singer, actress, and radio star.

== Early life and education ==
Sylvia La Torre was born on June 4, 1933, to director Olive La Torre and actress Leonora Reyes. She was widely recognized by her nickname, Ibyang.

She attended the University of Santo Tomas Conservatory of Music under a scholarship where she earned a degree in Voice and Music.

== Career ==
La Torre's career in Philippine entertainment spanned radio, television, recording, stage, and film. She became a presence during a period when opportunities for women in the industry were still limited.

=== Early years ===
Ibyang's singing career started in 1938 when she sang "Ako ay Bulaklak ng Kawangis" and won first prize at a singing competition at the Savoy Theater in Manila.

Classified as a spinto soprano, she possessed a lyric timbre capable of executing delicate upper-register passages while retaining the requisite power and dramatic weight for more intense sequences.

La Torre, whose father was a film director, was not new to movie-making. She appeared in the 1941 film Ang Maestra. She was featured in other films of Sampaguita Pictures.

She also sang at the Life Theater several years later, and a frequent feature at the Manila Grand Opera House and the Clover Theater.

Her first recording was C'est Petite Mon Amour with Jerry and His Romancers, on Bataan Records in 1950. Next was her hit song, My Broken Heart.

She was dubbed as the "Queen of Kundiman" for performing hundreds of songs such as "Mutya ng Pasig", "Waray-Waray" (later covered by Eartha Kitt) and "Maalaala Mo Kaya".

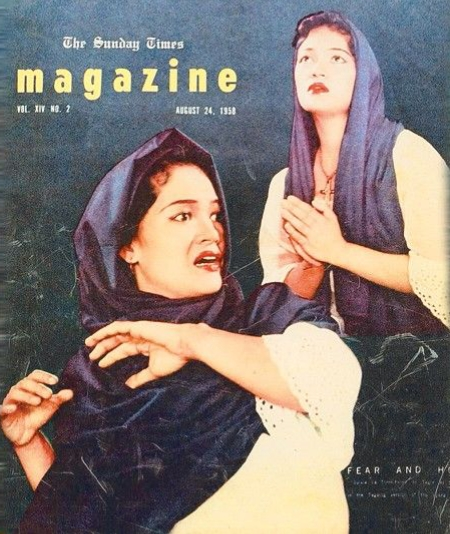
Sylvia La Torre as Micaela in the Filipinized version of Bizet's Carmen shown in the cover of The Sunday Times Magazine ©1958.

In the 1958 restaging of the Tagalog adaptation of Georges Bizet's Carmen at the Far Eastern University Auditorium, La Torre assumed the role of Micaela, the childhood sweetheart of the protagonist Don José. La Torre, then a student at the University of Santo Tomas Conservatory of Music, replaced her mentor, Salvacion Oppus Yñiguez, for this production. Her performance was a central element of the "Filipinized" opera, which featured a libretto in Tagalog and settings relocated to local landmarks such as Binondo and Tagaytay.

=== Rise to prominence ===
Sylvia appeared as Sebya in the radio series Sebya Mahal Kita, with Pugo and Rosa Aguirre. She appeared in Takas sa Bataan (1950), directed by her father, Olive La Torre. Other films include Ulila ng Bataan, Buhay Pilipino, Ang Asawa Kong Amerikana, and 24 na Pag-Ibig.

Sylvia was among the early pioneers of Philippine television through her participation in the musical-variety program Caltex Star Caravan, one of the country's earliest sponsored television shows. The program marked her first regular television appearance, where she performed classical songs and showcased her vocal talent before rising to prominence as a major musical-variety star. Hosted by Jaime de la Rosa, the show also featured dramatic productions directed by James Reuter, contributing to its reputation as a more refined alternative to other variety programs of its era.

In 1960, La Torre was featured in the radio program Tuloy ang Ligaya of the Manila Broadcasting Company (MBC) with Lita Guttierez and Oscar Obligacion. The radio program was made into a television program known as The Big Show which was hosted by La Torre and Obligacion.

Due to the success of The Big Show, ABS-CBN offered the two to host its noontime television show Oras ng Ligaya. For this, she earned the title "First Lady of Philippine Television". She was a regular on the radio series Tang Tarang Tang and the TV sitcom of the same name, where she starred with comedians Pugo and Bentot. She also starred in the film adaptation of Tang-Tarang- Tang and its sequel My Little Kuwan.

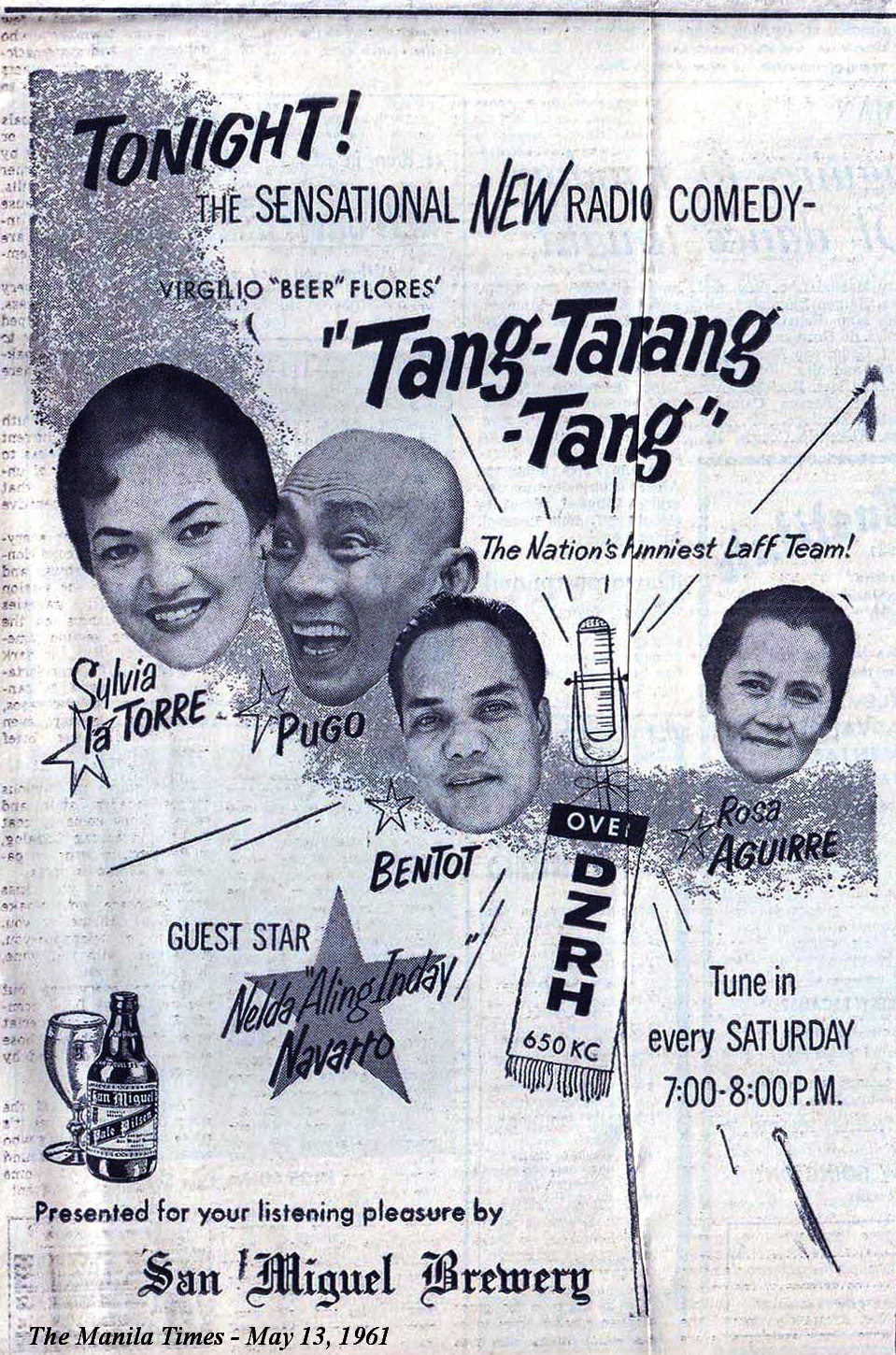
Tang-Tarang-Tang radio show print ad at The Manila Times ©1961.

In 1962, La Torre appeared in Tang-Tarang-Tang, a comedy film produced by Dalisay Pictures and adapted from the popular DZRH radio program of the same name. The film starred comedians Pugo and Bentot, with La Torre featured among the supporting cast alongside actress Rosa Aguirre, broadcaster Dely Magpayo, Cris de Vera, and Leroy Salvador. Additional cast members included Mariquit Soliman, Jose Vergara, and Von Serna.

In April 1962, "Dankasi 'y Tuwis Ka ng Tuwis" was released by Villar Records as one of the first Filipino twist singles, performed by La Torre during the height of the Twist dance craze in the Philippines. The novelty song, written by Levi Celerio, described the growing popularity of the dance style among Filipino audiences. Its B-side, "Twit Twit Twist," was released alongside the single while La Torre was also active in radio and novelty recordings.

In April 1967, La Torre recorded another two singles for Villar Records: "Inday, Palalayasin Kita" backed with "Tararadyeng Pot Pot," and "Lamok" backed with "Hindi Na Nagbalik." At the time, La Torre was active as a radio and television performer on the Channel 3 programs Oras ng Ligaya and Tang Tarang Tang.

On April 15, 1983, La Torre collaborated with fellow soprano Conching Rosal for the concert May Rosal at Torre at Manila's Philamlife Auditorium. Directed by Ernani Cuenco and Ed Borbon. The performance highlighted La Torre’s versatility by featuring a mix of classical music, kundiman, and novelty songs. The concert underscored her ability to bridge the gap between operatic performance and mainstream popularity, a trait she maintained throughout her career in film and television.

She would continue to perform, even as she immigrated to the United States.

La Torre's filmography spans until the 1990s. Among her noted films are Ulila ng Bataan and Buhay Pilipino in 1952 and Nukso nang Nukso in 1960. She also starred in the 1988 Seiko film One Two Bato, Three Four Bapor.

In 1989, Sylvia appeared as a guest performer on Ryan Cayabyab's iconic musical show Ryan Ryan Musikahan where she performed classic songs alongside artists like Diomedes Maturan and Bobby Gonzales.

=== Later Years ===
In California, Ibyang and other US-based Filipino actors such as Oscar Obligacion would activate their Oras ng Ligaya group and perform in fund-raising shows.

She celebrated her 50th anniversary in show business in 1994 at the Shrine Auditorium in Los Angeles.

In November 27, 2010, Sylvia performed alongside Sarah Geronimo at a benefit concert presented by the Cultural Center of the Philippines, in support of young Filipino musicians and nurture the Philippine symphonic band tradition, called Laro: A Child's Play at the CCP.

On June 7, 2015, La Torre topbilled the 117th Philippine Independence celebration outside the country in Madison Avenue in New York City, organized by Philippine Independence Day Council Inc. (PIDCI). She performed during the program that followed the foot and float parade.

She headlined a Filipino American Symphony Orchestra concert on August 13, 2016 at the John Wayne Performing Arts Center in Glendale, California. The concert was well received by the audience.

Sylvia’s last major stage performance was when she performed with the Filipino -American Symphony Orchestra (FASO) at the Mary Pickford Estate in Los Angeles on June 17, 2017. At that concert, she sang her signature song "Sa Kabukiran" and she also received the inaugural Excellence in Music Award. The gala was attended by then Philippine Vice-President Leni Robredo as guest of honor.

== Personal life ==
Ibyang married Celso Perez de Tagle, a dentist, on October 9, 1954 at the Lourdes Church in Quezon City. They had three children. La Torre was a devout Roman Catholic and a Marian devotee.

Her family immigrated to the United States in the 1989 where she continued performing and constantly advocated for the preservation and promotion of Philippine music.

The couple renewed their marital vows on their golden wedding anniversary at St. Denis Church in South Diamond Bar, California.

Her granddaughter, Anna Maria Perez de Tagle, is also an actress, known for appearing in Hannah Montana and Camp Rock.

== Death ==
La Torre died in her sleep on December 1, 2022.

== In pop culture ==
Ibyang, Mahal Kita in 2025

In the early 1980s, Sylvia La Torre gained renewed popularity through her radio and television advertisements for a laundry detergent brand. Her memorable rendition of the campaign’s jingle, "Labadami, Labango" became widely recognized and turned into a household staple during the period.

In the 1986 concert of Celeste Legaspi entitled "Celeste Sine Sine: A Concert in Glorious Agfa Color" at the Folk Arts Theatre, the Filipino singing group The CompanY performed a medley of Sylvia La Torre songs. During her 2006 US tour, Sarah Geronimo performed a tribute segment honoring Sylvia La Torre. The set featured reinterpretations of classic Original Pilipino Music (OPM) songs “Waray-Waray” and "Balut” in a contemporary arrangement influenced by hip-hop and pop styles.

Following her death on December 1, 2022, her original rendition of the Maalaala Mo Kaya theme song was featured in the ABS-CBN's anthology series Maalaala Mo Kaya finale episode, “Scarlet Women,” which aired on December 10, 2022.

In an episode shown on May 1, 2025 of "The Clones: Ka-Voice of the Stars," a popular singing and soundalike competition segment on TV5's Eat Bulaga!, one contestant mimicked the singing voice of Sylvia La Torre with the song "Sa Kabukiran."

Ibyang, Mahal Kita, a tribute concert celebrating La Torre’s stellar legacy — on stage, in film, on the airwaves, on vinyl, and on television, was held at the historic Manila Metropolitan Theater on May 29, 2025 in celebration of Philippine National Heritage Month.

== Awards and accolades ==
Sylvia was honored with the inaugural Excellence in Music Award by the Filipino-American Symphony Orchestra (FASO). She received this recognition for her iconic, eight-decade career in music, radio, film, and television, which included a memorable performance of "Sa Kabukiran" with FASO in Los Angeles on June 17, 2017.

Ruben Nepales of The Philippine Inquirer spoke of Sylvia: "Before there was Beyoncé, before there was Madonna, even way before Barbra Streisand... We had Sylvia La Torre. Our beloved Queen of Kundiman pioneered and conquered them all—the stage, radio, television, recording and film."

Mitch Valdes fondly remembers the late Sylvia La Torre as an iconic soprano and artist who never failed to bring a smile to her face, noting La Torre’s infectious charm and wit. The two shared a deep professional connection in the Philippine entertainment industry, having cohosted the television show Tony Santos Presents.

Dennis Marasigan, of the Cultural Center of the Philippines (CCP), praised La Torre: “Sylvia La Torre is a multi-hyphenate performer, having achieved success on the stage, radio, television, and film as well as in the recording industry. Even if she has not been conferred the Order of National Artist, she is already one in the hearts and minds of many Filipinos. In fact, she is one who can deservedly be called an Artist of and for the Filipino people.”

Year	Category	Work	Organizations	Result	Ref.
1997	Ading Fernando Lifetime Achievement Award	Herself	PMPC Star Awards for Television	Won	
2017	Excellence in Music Award	Herself	Filipino-American Symphony Orchestra	Won	

== Filmography and radio ==
=== Film ===
Year	Title	Role	Genre	Notes	Ref.
1941	Ang Maestra			Director: Gerardo de Leon; Production Company: Parlatone Hispano Filipino and ProRDR Productions	
1949	Biro ng Tadhana				
1952	Buhay Pilipino				
1952	Ulila ng Bataan				
1952	Gorio at Tekla				
1953	Ang Asawa Kong Americana				
1958	My Little Kuwan				
1959	Puro Utos, Puro Utos				
1959	Nukso nang Nukso	Sebya	Comedy	Director: Fred Daluz; Writer: Virgilio "Beer" Flores; Production Company: LVN Pictures	
1960	Yantok Mindoro				
1961	Oh Sendang				
1962	Tang-Tarang-Tang				
1963	Sakay and Moy				
1974	Oh Maggie Oh				
1978	Chimoy at Chimay				
1987	Jack & Jill	Doña Estrella "Star" Bartolome			
1989	M&M, The Incredible Twins	Sabel	Comedy	Director: Leroy Salvador; Writers: Bert De Leon and Jose Javier Reyes; Production Company: Viva Films	
1989	One Two Bato, Three Four Bapor	Julie	Comedy	Director: Ben Feleo; Writers: Jake Cocadiz and Ben Feleo; Production Company: Seiko Films	
1993	Ligaw-ligawan Kasal-kasalan Bahay-bahayan	Petra Batibot (in the segment "Kasal-Kasalan")	Comedy	Director: Joey Gosiengfiao; Writers: Joey Gosiengfiao and Danny L. Zialcita; Production Company: Regal Films; Release Date: March 17, 1993	
1997	Biyudo Si Daddy, Biyuda Si Mommy	Mom Sharon	Comedy	Director: Tony Y. Reyes; Production Company: M-Zet Productions and Star Cinema	

=== Television ===
Sylvia La Torre was among the prominent figures in early Philippine television, known for her work as a singer, comedienne, and variety show performer. Over several decades, she became recognized for her vocal performances and comedic character portrayals.

She was a regular performer on the long-running variety program Oras ng Ligaya, alongside Oscar Obligacion. The show became one of the popular television programs of its era and is regarded as an early precursor to modern noontime variety shows in the Philippines. Prior to this, La Torre also appeared in early television variety programs such as The Big Show, considered among the country’s first musical variety shows on television, and The Best Show, where she performed with entertainers including Chichay, Eddie San Jose, and Vic Pacia.

Year	Title	Role	Genre	Notes	Ref.
1953	Caltex Star Caravan	Performer	Musical	Sylvia's first regular TV show was the musical Caltex Star Caravan where she performed classical songs.	
	The Big Show	Co-Host	Variety	With Cris de Vera and Oscar Obligacion (Manila Broadcasting Company)	
	The Best Show	Host	Variety	ABS-CBN	
1962 – 1972	Oras ng Ligaya	Co-Host	Variety	Weekday television show with Sylvia, Eddie San Jose, Vic Pacia and Oscar Obligacion. Gina Pareño later joined the cast sometime in 1968.; ABS-CBN Channel 3; Director: Tony Santos, Sr.	
	Everyday Holiday	Host	Variety		
	Ituloy ang Saya	Co-Host	Variety	Produced by husband Celso and good friend Oscar Obligacion (Channel 5)	
1975	Basta Mahal Kita		Sitcom	Co-starring Luis Gonzales, Arnold Gamboa, Che-Che Perez de Tagle (Ibyang’s daughter), and Sandy ‘Atcheng’ Garcia.; Writer: Bibeth Orteza; Director: Maning Rivera	
1989	Ryan Ryan Musikahan	Guest Performer	Musical	Ryan Cayabyab, on piano; Other guest performers: Diomedes Maturan and Bobby Gonzales; Director: Leo Rialp; Network: ABS-CBN	
2001-2002	Biglang Sibol, Bayang Impasibol	Spinster Aunt	Comedy/Drama	A Philippine television drama comedy series broadcast by GMA Network.; Director: Jeffrey Jeturian; Release: March 12, 2001 – January 25, 2002	
2002	May Milagro Pa Nga Ba? (Ang Awit ni Miling) (2002)	Miling	Drama	An APT Entertainment Production episode shown on GMA Network as part of Eat Bulaga's Lenten Specials where Sylvia played the title role.; Director: Jeffrey Jeturian; Release: March 30, 2002	
2002-2003	Kahit Kailan	Doña Sonia	Drama	A Philippine television drama romance series broadcast by GMA Network starring Jolina Magdangal.; Director: Ruel S. Bayani; Release: May 5, 2002 - July 6, 2003	

=== Radio shows ===
Before the rise of television in the Philippines, Sylvia La Torre was among the country’s popular radio performers. She became known for her versatile vocal characterizations, portraying a wide range of personalities—from strict and authoritative figures to demure characters, as well as children, elderly women, and provincial personas. Her work in radio established her reputation as a versatile entertainer prior to her later success in television and film.

Year	Title	Role	Station	Notes	Ref.
1950s	Luz Mat Castro's Radio Show	Regular Talent/Singer	DZRH		
1961	Tang-Tarang- Tang	Ibyang	DZRH	A one hour weekly radio presentation by San Miguel Brewery, featuring the comedy team of Pugo and Bentot, Sylvia La Torre, Leroy Salvador, Rosa Aguirre and Cris De Vera	

=== Stage credits ===
In November 2010, Sylvia La Torre performed in the concert Laro: Child's Play at the CCP at the Cultural Center of the Philippines (CCP), an event produced by the Young Musicians Development Organization (YMDO) under the leadership of Irene Marcos-Araneta. Backed by the 62-piece Philippine Youth Symphonic Band, La Torre shared the stage with baritone Andrew Fernando and singer Sarah Geronimo to showcase traditional kundiman and support the training of young Filipino orchestral talents.

Year	Title	Role	Location	Notes	Ref
1958	Carmen	Micaela	Far Eastern University Auditorium	A 1958 re-staging of Georges Bizet's Carmen, translated into Filipino.; Cast: Don David, tenor, as Don Jose and Conching Rosal, soprano, as Carmen; With The Manila Symphony Orchestra with Herbert Zipper conducting; Far Eastern University Auditorium	
1983	May Rosal at Torre	Performer	PhilamLife Auditorium, Manila	With fellow soprano Conching Rosal; Directed by Ernani Cuenco and Ed Borbon	
2010	Laro: Child's Play at the CCP	Soloist	Main Theater, Cultural Center of the Philippines	Laro: Child's Play at the CCP was held on November 27, 2010, at the CCP Main Theater.; Performers: The concert featured Sylvia La Torre, baritone Andrew Fernando, and pop singer Sarah Geronimo.; Accompanying Ensemble: They were backed by the 62-piece (or 64-piece) Philippine Youth Symphonic Band (PYSB), which is supported by the YMDO.; Production: The show was produced by YMDO (headed by Irene M. Araneta, chair, and Maja Olivares-Co, executive director) to support young Filipino musicians and preserve the symphonic band tradition.; Significance: The concert bridged generations of Filipino artists, with veteran icon Sylvia La Torre performing alongside young musicians aged 7 to 23.	
2017	A Night of Symphony: Excellence Awards Dinner and Gala	Performer and Awardee	Mary Pickford Estate, Los Angeles	Sylvia La Torre was honored with the inaugural Excellence in Music Award by the Filipino-American Symphony Orchestra (FASO); The award was presented during the "A Night of Symphony – Excellence Awards Dinner and Gala"; FASO honored her for her eight-decade career and excellence in music.; Attended by Vice President Leni Robredo.	

== Discography ==
Studio Albums

The following list is chronological where possible. Because many of the original vinyl releases by Villar Records did not include manufacture years in the liner notes or sleeve covers, some dates are estimated or unknown.

Studio Albums
Year	Title	Tracklisting	Notes	Ref.
1956	Kung Kita'y Kapiling (1956)	1. Ang Tangi kong Pag-ibig; 2. Kung Kita'y Kapiling; 3. Sa Pagpatak ng Ulan; 4. Hirap ng Umibig; 5. Asahan Mo; 6. Di Magtataksil; 7. Maalala Mo Kaya; 8. Binibiro Lamang Kita; 9. Ikinalulungkot Ko; 10. Kasalanan Ba Ang Umibig; 11. Luha sa Hatinggabi; 12. Sampaguita	Label: Villar – MLS 5160; Format: Vinyl, LP, Album; Country: Philippines; Released: 1956; Genre: Folk, World, & Country	
1962	Sylvia Sings Kundiman (1962)	1. Pakiusap (Request); 2. Nasaan Ang Aking Irog (Where Is My Heart); 3. Mutya Ng Pasig (Muse Of The Pasig); 4. Pahiwatig (Lament); 5. Paglingap (Emotion); 6. Nasaan Ka Irog (Love Where Are You); 7. Ani Kaya Ang Kapalaran (What Is My Destiny); 8. Madaling Araw (Dawn)	Label: Villar – VLP-4022; Format: Vinyl, LP; Country: Philippines; Released: 1962; Genre: Folk, World, & Country; Style: Philippine Classical	
1974	Bulaga! (1974)	1. Para Na Ho! Mama!; 2. Ang Ating Polka; 3. Ang Bilin Ni Inang; 4. Ligaw Patula, Nakakasuya; 5. Kasabihan; 6. Bulaga!; 7. Ahora Mismo; 8. Huwag Mong Biruin (Nang 'Di Ka "Kung-Fu"-hin); 9. Awit At Pag-Ibig; 10. Buhay Ko'y Tanging Ikaw; 11. 'Di Makahalata; 12. Ang Dalaga sa Bukid	Label: Plaka Pilipino – TSP-5147; Format: Vinyl, LP, Album, Stereo; Country: Philippines; Released: 1974; Genre: Latin, Pop; Style: Novelty, Cha-Cha	
	Sylvia Sings Dahil Sa Iyo, Ikaw, Basang Sisiw And Other Love Songs	1. Ako'y Lumauluha; 2. Manalig Ka; 3. Dahil Sa Iyo; 4. Mahal Na Mahal Kita; 5. Tirana Biya-i; 6. Nasaan Ang Sumpa Mo; 7. May Araw Ka Rin; 8. Malaking Hirap; 9. Ikaw; 10. Hanggang Sa Mag-Umaga; 11. Basang Sisiw; 12. Luha	Label: Villar – MLP / MLS-5168; Format: Vinyl, LP; Country: Philippines; Genre: Folk, World, & Country; Style: Pacific	
	Songs of Love	1. Hanggang Langit (Till Eternity); 2. Salawahan (Unfaithful); 3. Irog Ng Buhay (Love Of My Live); 4. Lihim Kitang Iniibig (I Love You Secretly); 5. Ang Langit Ko'y Ikaw (You're My Heavenly Love); 6. Irog, Nasaan Ang Pag-ibig? (Darling, Where Is Your Love?); 7. Babalik Ka Rin (You'll Return To Me); 8. Irog Ko (My Sweetheart); 9. Sa Duyan Ng Pagmamahal (Cradle Of Love); 10. Iyong Iyong (Yours Alone); 11. Bakit Mo Ako Pinaluluha? (Why Do You Make Me Cry?); 12. Hiram na Ligaya (Borrowed Happiness)	Genre: Pop, Folk, World, & Country; Music Director: Leopoldo Silos	
	Balitaw	1. Dalaga't Binata; 2. Sa Libis ng Nayon; 3. Halina't Magsaya; 4. Maligayang Araw; 5. Banahaw; 6. Buhay Sa Nayon; 7. Tunay na Ligaya; 8. Katkataka; 9. Sa Bukid; 10. Ang Paglalaba; 11. Ang Dalagang Nayon; 12. Pook na Kaakit-akit	Genre: Folk, World, & Country; Style: Philippine Classical; Music Director: Leopoldo Silos	
	Katuwaan	1. Katuwaan; 2. Taguan; 3. Bahay Kubo; 4. Awat Na Adyang; 5. Dankasi'y Tuwis Ka Ng Tuwis; 6. Magsaya Ka At Ngumiti; 7. Magsayawan; 8. Ako'y Nagmamahal; 9. Ewan Ko Ba; 10. Sino Man Ang Nagsabi; 11. Twit Twit Twist; 12. Parti-lain	Label: Villar – MLP 5041-S; Format: Vinyl, LP, Stereo; Country: Philippines; Genre: Jazz, Pop, Folk, World, & Country	
	Sa Kabukiran	1. Sa Kabukiran; 2. Lawiswis Kawayan; 3. Kulasisi; 4. Paruparo Sa Bulaklak; 5. Gintong Silahis; 6. Kasing Bango Ng Pagsinta; 7. Ako'y Kampupot; 8. Luha Sa Kalipay; 9. Masaganang Kabukiran; 10. Ginintuang Ani; 11. Ilang-Ilang; 12. Pamaypay Ng Maynila	Genre: Pop, Folk, World, & Country; Style: Philippine Classical; Musical Director: Leopoldo Silos	
	Kundiman	1. Nasaan Ka Irog; 2. Ibong Sawi; 3. Madaling Araw; 4. Pahiwatig; 5. Ano Kaya Ang Kapalaran; 6. Pakiusap; 7. Ay Kalisud; 8. Bituing Marikit; 9. Paglingap; 10. Mutya Ng Pasig; 11. Tampuhan; 12. Nasaan Ang Aking Puso	Label: Villar – MLS 5147; Format: Vinyl, LP, Album, Stereo; Country: Philippines; Genre: Folk, World, & Country; Musical Director: Leopoldo Silos	
	Waray Waray	1. Waray Waray; 2. Ang Kasing-Kasing Ko; 3. Carinosa; 4. Kung Ako'y Iibig; 5. ALibambang; 6. Bingwit Ng Pag-Ibig; 7. Batanguena; 8. Galawgaw; 9. Tinikling; 10. Singsing; 11. Nangangarap; 12. Hijo De Familia	Label: Villar – MLS 5161; Format: Vinyl, LP, Reissue; Country: Philippines; Genre:Folk, World, & Country	
	Ikaw Kasi	1. Aling Kutsero; 2. No Money, No Honey; 3. Bahala Na!; 4. Etsetera! Etsetera! Etsetera!; 5. Alak; 6. Please Lang!; 7. Ikaw Kasi; 8. Hindi Basta Basta; 9. Alembong; 10. Phone Pal; 11. Ay! Anong Saklap!; 12. Isang Aral	Label: Villar – MLS 5184; Format: Vinyl, LP, Album, Stereo; Country: Philippines; Genre: Pop, Folk, World, & Country	
	Kalesa	1. Kalesa; 2. Fiesta; 3. Ako Ay Iyo; 4. Ano Ba?; 5. Halikan Mo Ako, Darling; 6. Pakwan; 7. Anak Ni Waray; 8. Probinsyano; 9. Nagnakaw Ng Halik; 10. Pampahimbing; 11. Basta't Mahal Kita; 12. Granada	Label: Villar – MLS-5021; Format: Vinyl, LP, Album, Stereo; Country: Philippines; Genre: Pop, Folk, World, & Country	
	Handang Matodas	1. Tugtugan; 2. One, Two, Three; 3. Ang Hirap Kay Inday; 4. Golpe De Gulat; 5. Handang Matodas; 6. Easy Ka Lang Padre; 7. Mang Teban; 8. Binatang Kapampangan; 9. No Touch, Filipino Kostum; 10. Sabungero; 11. Puting Texas; 12. Peks Man	Label: Villar – MLS-5176; Format: Vinyl, LP, Album, Stereo; Country: Philippines; Genre: Folk, World, & Country	
	Mga Awit ng Pag-Ibig	1. Mahal na Mahal Kita; 2. Asahan Mo; 3. Luha sa Hating-Gabi; 4. Hirap Ng Umibig; 5. Binibiro Lamang Kita; 6. Manalig Ka; 7. Luha; 8. Paglubog Ng Araw	Label: Villar Records – VLP 4055; Format: Vinyl, 10", 78 RPM, Album; Country: Philippines; Released: Genre: Folk, World, & Country; Style: Philippine Classical	
	Sylvia Sings	1. Waray Waray; 2. Carinosa; 3. Dahil Sa Iyo; 4. Bituin Marikit; 5. Ang Kasing-Kasing Ko; 6. Tinikling; 7. Ikaw; 8. Basang Sisiw	Label: Villar – VLP-4005; Format: Vinyl, LP, 10", Album, Mono; Country: Philippines; Genre: Folk, World, & Country; Style: Philippine Classical	

Collaborative Albums
Year	Title	Tracklisting	Notes	Ref.
1974	Pasiklaban: Sylvia La Torre at Bobby Gonzales (1974)			
	Pasko (Christmas)		with Ruben Tagalog, Sylvia La Torre, Fred Larosa, Reycard Duet and Tres Rosas	
1998	Kalayaan: Kayamanan ng Bayan - Philippine Centennial 1898-1998 (1998)	1. Juan Silos Jr. and His Rondalla - Ang Aking Bandila 2:25; 2. Ruben Tagalog - Bayan Ko - 3:14; 3. Tres Rosas - Sampaguita - 3:20; 4. Sylvia La Torre - Sa Sariling Bayan - 2:53; 5. Mabuhay Singers - Mutya ng Silangan - 2:51; 6. Mabuhay Singers - Bella Pilipina - 3:01; 7. Tres Rosas - Pilipinas, Inang Bayan - 2:32; 8. Mabuhay Singers - Ilang-Ilang - 3:06; 9. Mabuhay Singers - Ang Bayan Ko't Aking Lahi - 2:56; 10. Tres Rosas - Pilipinas Kong Mahal - 2:34; 11. Juan Silos Jr. and His Rondalla - Pagpupugay sa Republika - 2:53; 12. Ruben Tagalog - Mutya ng Silangan - 3:12; 13. Mabuhay Singers - Sampaguita - 3:20; 14. Sylvia La Torre - Ang Bayan Ko't Aking Lahi - 3:32; 15. Mabuhay Singers - Perlas ng Silangan - 2:39; 16. Mabuhay Singers - Bayan Ko - 2:52; 17. Tres Rosas - Awit ni Maria Clara - 3:16; 18. Mabuhay Singers - Barong Tagalog - 2:49; 19. Mabuhay Singers - Sa Sariling Bayan - 2:43; 20. Mabuhay Singers - Pambansang Awit - 1:09	Artist: Various Artists Heritage Series; Villar Records; Ruben Tagalog, Sylvia La Torre, Mabuhay Singers, Juan Silos Jr.; Type: Compilation; Released: 1998; Genres: Kundiman; Philippine Rondalla	

List of songs recorded by Sylvia La Torre

- Akala'y Totoo (Pangarap Lang Pala)
- Ako Ay Iyo – 1959
- Ako'y Kampupot – 1954
- Ako'y Lumuluha
- Ako'y Nagmamahal – 1961
- Alak (record) – 1965
- Alembong – 1958
- Alibambang
- Aling Kutsero – 1956
- Anak ni Waray – 1959
- Ano Ba – 1959
- Ang Giliw Na Ibig Ko – 1960
- Ang Dalagang Nayon
- Ang Hirap Kay' Inday
- Ang Kasing-Kasing ko
- Ang Langit Ko'y Ikaw
- Ang Paglalaba
- Ano Ba
- Ano Kaya ang Kapalaran – 1955
- Arimunding-Munding – 1953
- Asahan Mo
- Atik
- Awat na Adyang – 1961
- Ay Anong Saklap – 1960
- Ay Kalisud – 1954
- "Babalik Ka Rin"
- "Bahala Na" – 1956
- "Bahay-Kubo (Sylvia)" – 1966
- "Bakit Mo Ako Pinaluha"
- "Banahaw"
- "Basang Sisiw"
- "Basta't Mahal Kita" – 1959
- "Batanguena" – 1954
- "Binatang Kapampangan"
- "Bingwit ng Pag-ibig"
- "Binibiro Lamang Kita"
- "Biru-Biruan"
- "Bituing Marikit" – 1952
- "Buhay sa Nayon"
- "Bulaklak at Paru-Paro" – 1954
- "Carinosa"
- "Chimoy at Chimay" – 1973
- "Dadaldal-Daldal"
- "Dahil Sa Polka" – 1965
- "Dahil sa Iyo"
- "Dahil sa Polka"
- "Dalaga't Binata"
- "Dankasi'y Tuwis Ka ng Tuwis" (1962)
- "Di Magtataksil"
- "Di Mahahadlangan"
- Easy Ka Lang Padre – 1956
- Etcetera...Etcetera...Etcetera... – 1966
- Ewan Ko Ba – 1962
- Fiesta – 1960
- Galawgaw – 1955
- Ginintuang Ani – 1954
- Gintong Silahis – 1954
- Golpe de Gulat – 1967
- Granada (Sylvia) – 1968
- Habang May Buhay – 1965
- Halikan Mo Ako Darling – 1959
- Halina't Magsaya
- Handang Matodas
- Hanee-Hanee
- Hanggang Langit
- Hanggang sa Mag-Umaga
- Hijo de Familia
- Hindi Basta-Basta – 1956
- Hindi Na Nagbalik
- Hirap ng Umibig
- Huwag Ka Sanang Pikon – 1962
- Ibong Sawi – 1953
- Ikaw
- Ikaw Kasi – 1956
- Ikinalulungkot Ko
- Ilang-Ilang – 1954
- Inday Palalayasin Kita
- Irog Kay Sarap
- Irog Ko
- Irog ng Buhay
- Irogm Nasaan ang Pag-ibig
- Isang Aral – 1967
- Iyung-Iyo
- Jukebox Rock
- Kalesa – 1959
- Kasalanan Ba ang Umibig
- Kasing Bango ng Pagsinta – 1954
- Katakataka
- Katimbang ng Buhay
- Katuwaan
- Kikisay-Kisay
- Kulasisi – 1954
- Kumare, Kumpadre 1952 (Sylvia La Torre & Alfred La Roza)
- Kung Akoy Iibig
- Kung Kita'y Kapiling
- Kung Nagsasayaw
- Laba-Laba-Laba
- Lalake at Lamok
- Larawan ng Pagsinta
- Lawiswis Kawayan – 1954
- Lihim Kitang Iniibig
- Luha
- Luha sa Hatinggabi
- Luha sa Kalipay – 1954
- Maalaala Mo Kaya
- Mabuti Pa
- Madaling Araw
- Magkatuwaan – 1966
- Magsaya ka't Ngumiti – 1967
- Magsayawan
- Magtiis ka Darling
- Mahal na Mahal kita
- Malaking Hirap
- Maligayang Araw
- Mamang Kartero
- Manalig ka
- Mang Teban
- Masaganang Kabukiran – 1954
- May Araw ka Rin
- Mutya ng Pasig – 1952
- Nagnakaw ng Halik – 1959
- Nakakabum – 1969
- Naman, Naman, Naman – 1970
- Nangangarap
- Nasaan
- Nasaan Ang Aking Puso – 1968
- Nasaan ang Sumpa Mo
- Nasaan Ka Irog – 1952
- No Money, No Honey – 1956
- No Touch, Filipino Kostum
- O.A.
- One, Two, Three
- Paglingap – 1953
- Paglubog ng Araw
- Pahiwatig – 1952
- Pakiusap – 1952
- Pakwan – 1959
- Pamaypay ng Maynila – 1954
- Pampahimbing – 1959
- Pandanggo sa Pag-ibig
- Pandangguhan (Sylvia) – 1954
- Parti-Lain (Sylvia) – 1961
- Paru-Paro sa Bulaklak
- Peks Man
- Phone Pal (Sylvia) – 1958
- Please Lang – 1960
- Pintasan – 1964
- Pook na Kaakit-akit
- Probinsyano (Sylvia) – 1959
- Puting Teksas – 1961
- Sa Bukid
- Sa Duyan ng Pagmamahal
- Sa Kabukiran – 1954
- Sa Libis ng Nayon
- Sa Pagpatak ng Ulan
- Salawahan
- Sampaguita
- Si Petite Mon Amour – Sylvia's first recording
- Singsing
- Sino Man ang Nagsabi – 1965
- Sosayting Dukha (song)
- Taguan (Sylvia) – 1966
- Talusaling Polka – 1964
- Tampal – 1969
- Tampuhan
- Taradyin Pot Pot
- Tayo'y Mamasko
- Tingnan Natin
- Tinikling (Sylvia) – 1963
- Tirana Biya
- Tugtugan – 1969
- Tsimoy at Tsimay with Bobby Gonzales
- Tunay na Ligaya
- Twit Twit Twit – 1963
- Walang Kuarta
- Waray-Waray – 1954
