= Bentot =

Filipino comedian

- Born: Arturo Vergara Medina; 13 July 1920; San Simon, Pampanga, Philippines
- Died: 19 June 1986 (aged 65); Manila, Philippines
- Resting place: Manila North Cemetery
- Occupations: Comedian, vaudevillian
- Years active: 1947–1978

Arturo Vergara Medina (13 July 1920 – 19 June 1986), better known by his stage name Bentot or Ben Cosca, was a Filipino comedian and vaudevillian who spent most of his career under LVN Pictures. He had many box office hits with another famed comedian Pugo who played his father in their films. He also appeared on the Manila bodabil circuit in its heyday in the fifties and early sixties.

== Biography ==
Arturo Vergara Medina was born in San Simon, Pampanga on 13 July 1920.

He made his first movie appearance in 1947's Maria Kapra, a musical by Sampaguita Pictures with Angel Esmeralda. He made his second and last movie for Sampaguita in 1951's Batas ng Daigdig aka Rule of the World. Then he moved to the rival studio of Sampaguita, LVN, and stayed until the film studio closed in 1961.

Bentot had a second life in radio and television, appearing as Bitoy in the radio and later TV comedy series Tang Tarang Tang with Pugo, Sylvia La Torre, Rosa Aguirre, and Marita Zobel.

He is the father of former child star Bentot Jr.

== Death ==
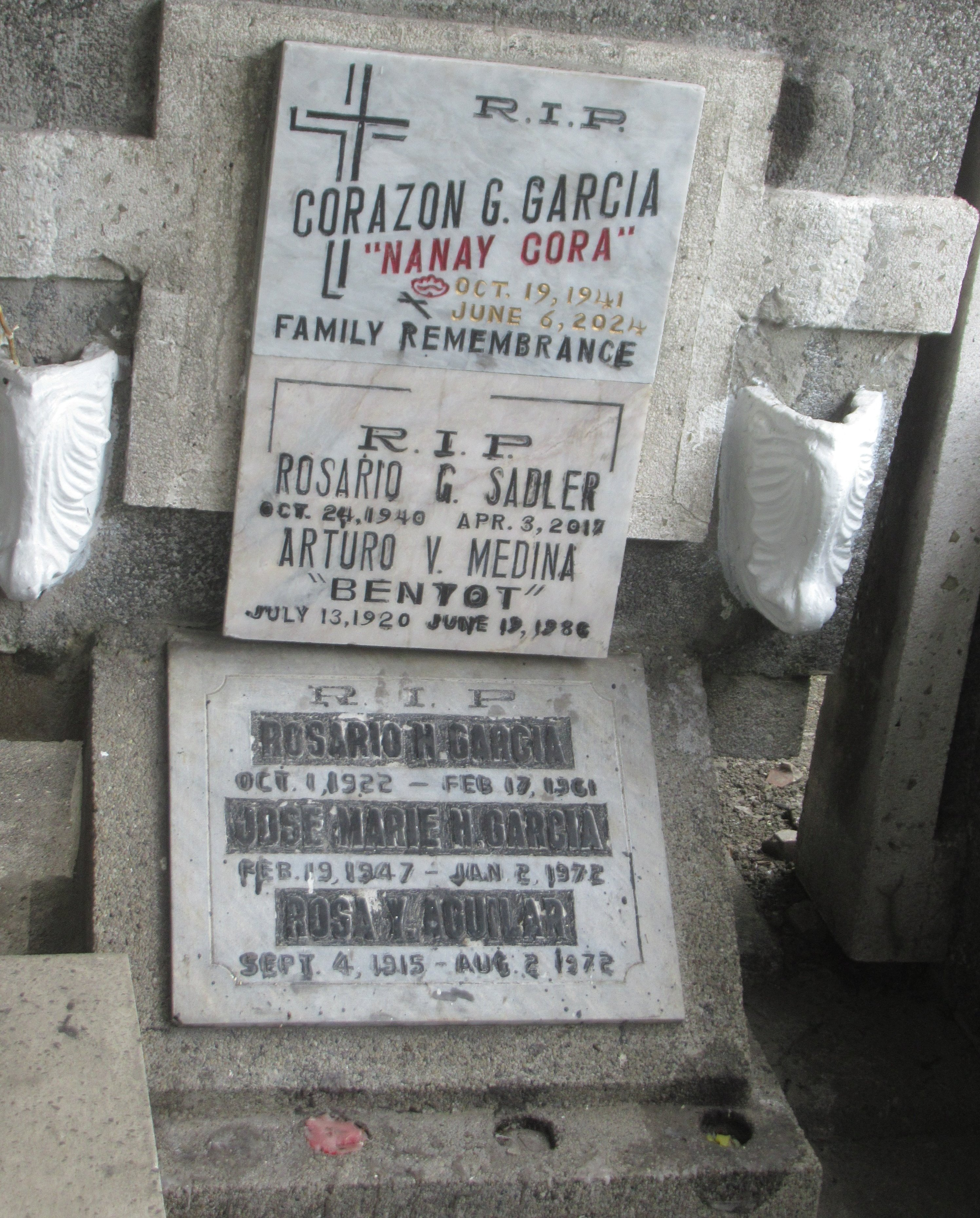
Bentot's family grave at Manila North Cemetery.

Bentot died on June 19, 1986, in Manila, Philippines at the age of 65 due to heart failure, a month shy of his 66th birthday.

== Filmography ==
=== Film ===
- Maria Kapra (1947)
- Batas ng Daigdig (1951)
- Phone Pal (1957)
- Sebya, Mahal Kita (1957)
- Alembong (1958)
- Mr. Kuripot (1958)
- Nukso nang Nukso (1960)
- Oh Sendang! (1960)
- Krus Na Daan (1960)
- Prinsipe Diomedes at ang Mahiwagang Gitara (1961)
- Lalaban Kami (1961)
- Dugo ng Sugatan (1964)
- Pagkatapos ng Kasal ("Sama ng Loob" segment, 1965)
- Tatlong Mabilis (1965)
- Mga Saragate (1965)
- Tatlong Mabilis sa Hongkong (1966)
- Pitong James Bonds (1966)
- Sexy sa Laban (1966)
- Pitong Zapata (1967)
- Si Inday sa Balitaw (1970)
- John & Marsha (1974)
- Loose Connection (1975)
- Kung May Tiyaga May Nilaga (1975)
- Harabas Is My Name (1975)
- Yolindina (1975)
- Taho-Ichi (1976)
- The Crazy Professor (1985)
- Praybeyt Depektib Akademi (1986)

=== Television ===
- Talagang Ganyan (1976)

== Discography ==
- "Jeproks" (1978) - Plaka Pilipino Records
- "Burloloy" (1978) - Plaka Pilipino Records
