= David Ezra =

David Ezra may refer to:

- David Alan Ezra (born 1947), U.S. district judge
- David Joseph Ezra (died 1882), merchant, property investor, and member of the Baghdadi Jewish community in Calcutta, India
- David Elias Ezra (1871–1947), member of the Baghdadi Jewish community in Calcutta, India
- David Ezra (born 1987), Filipino theater and film actor, singer, and son of Dulce
