= Bahay Kubo (song) =

Filipino folk song

- Language: Tagalog
- Bahay Kubo (3:35) Instrumental rendition performed by Kabataang Silay Rondalla in 2015

"Bahay Kubo" is a Tagalog-language folk song from the lowlands of Luzon, Philippines. It first appeared in a 1924 compilation of Filipino folk songs by Emilia S. Cavan.

The song is about a bahay kubo (lit. 'hut house' in English), a house made of bamboo with a roof of nipa leaves, surrounded by different kind of vegetables, and is frequently sung by Filipino schoolchildren, the song being as familiar as the "Alphabet Song" and "Twinkle Twinkle Little Star" from the West. Its composition is sometimes erroneously attributed to composer Felipe Padilla de León; he was only twelve when Cavan’s collection was published, and he later wrote an arrangement for the song.

== Listed plants ==
The song mentions eighteen plants by their Tagalog names, the majority being introduced species from Central and South America due to the Manila- galleon trade. The following list presents the plants in the order they appear in the song:

Common name	Species name	Local term
Jicama	Pachyrhizus erosus	singkamas
Eggplant	Solanum melongena	talóng
Winged bean	Psophocarpus tetragonolobus	sigarilyas
Peanut	Arachis hypogaea	manì
String bean	Phaseolus vulgaris	sitaw
Hyacinth bean	Lablab purpureus	bataw
Madagascar bean	Phaseolus lunatus	patáni
Wax gourd	Benincasa hispida	kundól
Sponge gourd	Luffa acutangula	patola
Birdhouse gourd	Lagenaria siceraria	upô
Winter squash	Cucurbita maxima	kalabasa
White radish	Raphanus sativus	lábanos
Brown mustard	Brassica juncea	mustasa
Onion	Allium cepa	sibuyas
Tomato	Solanum lycopersicum	kamatis
Garlic	Allium sativum	báwang
Ginger	Zingiber officinale	luya
Sesame	Sesamum indicum	lingá

== In popular culture ==
=== Film ===
On 5 August 1968, Bahay Kubo, Kahit Munti was produced by Sampaguita Pictures starring Rosemarie Sonora, Blanca Gomez and Ike Lozada and was directed by Jose De Villa. The title was based from the lyrics of the folk song. The movie was written by German Moreno.

=== Music ===
It was interpreted in 1966 by Sylvia La Torre in her album Katuwaan. The folk song was also included in the album Bahaghari of composer Ryan Cayabyab which was sung by Lea Salonga that also includes other Filipino traditional folk songs. It was also performed by the University of the Philippines Madrigal Singers during the 116th anniversary of the First Philippine Republic. On February 26 and 27, 2024, Lea Salonga and The Tabernacle Choir at Temple Square performed the song during the choirs world tour in the Philippines, at the SM Mall of Asia Arena.

=== Television ===
On Goin' Bulilit in March 2010, cast members Mika dela Cruz, Joseph Andre Garcia, Angel Sy, Aaron Junatas, Sharlene San Pedro, Noemi Oineza, Nash Aguas and Alexa Ilacad sings their parodic version due to El Niño phenomenon in the Philippines.

During Bulagaan on Eat Bulaga in August 25, 2012, hosts Joey de Leon and Wally Bayola sings a second version of the song features the other vegetables in the lyrics as their knock-knock joke.

It was later re-used as in the closing theme of Oh No, It' B.O. (Biro Only!) with lyrics "pag na-B.O."

In Work It Out Wombats!, Jun Jun is seen singing a few lines of the song in one episode.
