= Narding Anzures =

Filipino actor (1928–1949)

- Born: Bernardo Anzures; 1928; Manila, Insular Government of the Philippine Islands, U.S.
- Died: 1949 (aged 20–21)
- Other name: Binatillo
- Occupation: Actor
- Years active: 1935–1947

Bernardo "Narding" Anzures (1928–1949) was a Filipino film actor and convicted murderer.

The son of actors Miguel Anzures and Rosa Aguirre, Anzures had starred in pre–World War II films as a child actor under Sampaguita Pictures & LVN Pictures. After the war, he was paired with Lilian Velez in three films produced by Filippine Films & Philippine Pictures Inc., such as Binibiro Lamang Kita, Ang Estudyante, and Sa Kabukiran which was directed by Velez's husband, Jose Climaco.

== Selected filmography ==
Year	Title	Notes
1947	Sa Kabukiran	Composed by his former on-screen partner's father, Manuel Velez; and also his last film appearance with Lilian Velez as his on-screen partner
1947	Ang Estudyante	Second film appearance with Lilian Velez
1946	Death March	
1941	Binibiro Lamang Kita	First being paired with Lilian Velez as his first on-screen partner
1941	Binatillo	Final appearance with his father, Miguel Anzures
1940	Bahaghari	Final appearance with his mother, Rosa Aguirre
1940	Gunita	
1940	Inang Pulot	
1939	Ang Magsasampaguita	
1938	Ang Batang Tulisan	
1937	Ilaw ng Langit	
1937	Taong Demonyo	

== Murder of Lilian Velez ==
In 1948, LVN Pictures decided to cast Jaime de la Rosa as Velez's leading man in her next picture. After a dispute regarding the decision, at about 1:00 am on June 27, 1948, Anzures barged into the home of Velez in Quezon City and stabbed her and a housemaid to death in front of Velez's daughter Vivian and another housemaid. After the incident, Anzures fled to Santa Cruz, Laguna, where he surrendered a few days later.

== Death ==
At his trial, Anzures pled insanity, claiming to have been under a "fantastic spell" when he committed the crime, but eventually pled guilty on July 19, 1949. He was sentenced to two sentences of life imprisonment and was ordered to pay P5,000 each to the relatives of his victims, but was later pardoned by President Elpidio Quirino. He died from tuberculosis shortly after his release; his exact motives for the killings were never determined.

== In popular culture ==
- In the 1995 film The Lilian Velez Story, Filipino actor Cesar Montano played the role of Narding Anzures, who murdered actress singer Lilian Velez, which was played by the Sharon Cuneta. It was directed by Carlo J. Caparas and co-produced by Golden Lion Films and Viva Entertainment.

== Sources ==
- Garcia, Jessie B. (2004). A Movie Album Quizbook. Iloilo City, Philippines: Erehwon Books & Magazine. pp. 81–83. ISBN 971-93297-0-X.
- "When Local Movie Stars Turned to Stage Acting". Manila Bulletin. December 4, 2005. Archived from the original on July 14, 2014 – via HighBeam Research.
