= Justina David =

Filipina actress (born 1912)

- Born: 1912; Philippines
- Other name: Justiniana David
- Occupation: Actress
- Years active: 1939–1957

Justina David (born 1912, date of death unknown), sometimes credited as Justiniana David, was a Filipina film actress during the mid-20th century, often appearing in a supporting role, as a martyred wife, a peasant, or a hopeless mother. Her career began before World War II and extended to the late 1960s.

Born in 1912, she first appeared as a bit player in Sampaguita Pictures' Pasang Krus (Shouldered Cross), then progressed to various pre-war musical films at Sampaguita, including Magbalik ka, Hirang (Comeback, Darling), Gunita (Memory) with Corazon Noble, Carmen with Carmen Rosales, Balatkayo with Rudy Concepcion and Pagsuyo (Love).

After World War II, in 1947, she made a comeback in the LVN Pictures films Backpay with Corazon Noble, and Rogelio dela Rosa and Krus na Bituin (Crossed Star).

In 1949, she was in the first all-color Philippines film, Batakyon XIII.

In 1954, she returned to Sampaguita and made dozens of movies, including Pilya where she played the mother of Gloria Romero.

In 1956, she moved to Larry Santiago Production for Mrs Jose Romulo with Jose Romulo himself.

== Filmography ==
- 1939 - Pasang Krus
- 1940 - Magbalik ka, Hirang
- 1940 - Gunita
- 1941 - Carmen
- 1941 - Balatkayo
- 1941 - Pagsuyo
- 1946 - Victory Joe
- 1947 - Backpay
- 1947 - Romansa
- 1948 - Krus na Bituin
- 1948 - Waling-Waling
- 1949 - Milyonarya
- 1949 - Makabagong Pilipina
- 1949 - Tambol Mayor
- 1949 - Prinsesa Basahan
- 1949 - Hen. Gregorio del Pilar
- 1949 - Batalyon XIII
- 1950 - Nuno sa Punso
- 1951 - Makapili
- 1951 - Bayan O Pag-ibig
- 1951 - Anak ng Pulubi
- 1953 - Siklab sa Batangas
- 1954 - Pilya
- 1955 - Tatay na si Bondying
- 1955 - D 1-13
- 1955 - Bulaklak sa Parang
- 1955 - Sa Dulo ng Landas
- 1956 - Rodora
- 1956 - Mrs. Jose Romulo
- 1957 - Pasang Krus
- 1957 - Kandilang Bakal
- 1957 - Objective: Patayin si Magsaysay
