= Dulce (Filipino singer) =

Filipino singer and actress (born 1961)

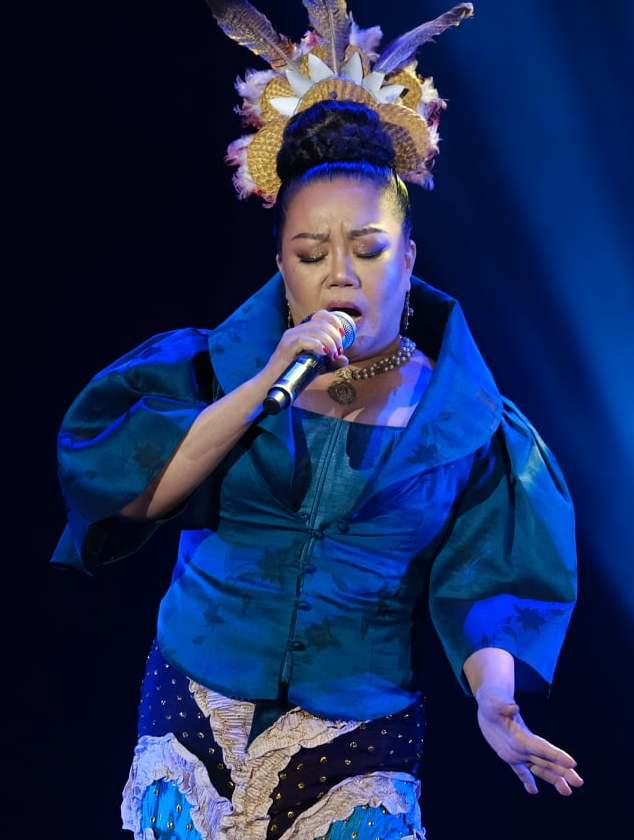
- Dulce in December 2021 performing at the 90th anniversary of the Manila Metropolitan Theater

Background information
- Also known as: Asia's Timeless Diva
- Born: María Teresa Magdalena Abellare Llamedo; July 22, 1961 (age 64); Cebu City, Philippines
- Genres: Original Pilipino Music
- Occupations: Singer, actress
- Years active: 1975–present

Maria Teresa Magdalena Abellare Llamedo-Cruzata (born July 22, 1961), known professionally as Dulce (Tagalog pronunciation: [ˈdʊlsɛ]), is a Filipino singer and actress. She is popularly referred to as "Asia's Timeless Diva".

Dubbed as one of the Philippines' natural treasures, Dulce is noted for her distinct vocal power and delivery. Among many of her international accolades includes the grand prize trophies at the 4th Asian Singing Competition in 1979 and the Asia-Pacific Singing Contest in 1988 in Hong Kong. She also finished first runner-up at the 3rd ABU Popular Song Festival in Malaysia and first runner-up at the Australia Open Entertainment Competition in 2002. She has already recorded 30 albums (including 12 solo albums) throughout her career and has sung in over thirty movie theme songs, thus earning her the moniker "Movie Theme Song Queen".

== Early life ==
Llamedo was born to a poor family of musicians on July 22, 1961, in Villa Bulsita, a sitio of Barangay Bulacao in Pardo, Cebu City. Her father, Leoncio, was a carpenter who played the double bass in the village band while her mother, Andrea, was a dress-maker who sang in their local chapel. She is the sixth of eight siblings having four sisters and three brothers.

Among her first five siblings, Llamedo is the only one who completed her elementary education (she was able to send her two younger siblings up to college). However, due to financial problems, she couldn't enroll even in public schools for higher education. She started singing at a very young age, joining her first amateur singing competition when she was just two years old. When she was 10, she became a regular at a Saturday television show hosted by Justo Justo. At 12, she was already performing at soda fountains in Cebu City.

== Career ==
In the early 1970s, she auditioned for Tawag ng Tanghalan but was initially rejected in her first attempt as she was still underaged. When she finally got to enter the competition, she became a weekly and then monthly champion but failed to make it to the grand championship. After the competition, she stayed in Manila for five months, performing covers of songs by Shirley Bassey, among others, and had occasional stints in bars and restaurants around downtown Manila, Quezon City, and Laguna. She returned to Cebu with her mother but left and came back to Manila at age 14 where she worked as a singer at a club-restaurant owned by a "controversial public official" who had abused her. It was in this club-restaurant, however, where Llamedo was discovered by the composer George Canseco who was searching for a singer to sing his theme for the 1978 film Miss Dulce Amor, Ina starring Lorna Tolentino. Considered to be her big break, from then on, Llamedo became known by her famous stage name Dulce.

In 1979, Dulce recorded her most famous song Ako Ang Nasawi, Ako ang Nagwagi ("I Had Been Defeated, I Had Won"). The song was sent by its composer, Canseco, to compete at the Metropop Song Festival but lost. Later that year, Dulce was sent to Hong Kong to compete at the Asian Singing Competition using an English - translated version (adaptation, "I Am Not Crying Over You") of the song as her performance piece. She, however, decided at the last minute to scrap the English translation and sing it in its original Tagalog form. She won the grand prize of the competition and later recounted that her win was the event that changed her life.

In the 1980s, there was an unofficial ban imposed on Dulce by several recording executives. During this time, she had joined the Philippine government's "Balik Saya" musical caravan singing theme songs of local movies in the United States and Canada. Recording executives, however, would block other deals she would make calling her "too rebellious".

In 1987, Dulce placed second with Nonoy Tan's entry "Langit - Kung Kaya Ko Kaya Mo Rin" at the ABU Popular Song Contest in Kuala Lumpur, Malaysia. The following year, she won the Grand Prize at the Asia Pacific Singing Competition where she sang Memory. Dulce auditioned for the role of Gigi in Miss Saigon when the producers first came to Manila. She was, however, unable to proceed with the audition due to acute pharyngitis. When the production team came back in 1990, she auditioned again and was instructed to fly to New York City. In New York, Cameron Mackintosh reportedly told her that she was "over-qualified" for the small role that was open and that it would be a waste of talent. Claude-Michel Schönberg is said to have commented that her voice "is like a Boeing 747 taking off".

From 1991 to 2004, Dulce's rendition of Constancio de Guzman's Maalaala Mo Kaya served as the theme song of the television drama anthology of the same name.

In 2003, she received a Lifetime Achievement Award at the Aliw Awards. That same year, she played Aling Saling in the first run of the musical Himala at the Cultural Center of the Philippines (CCP). She returned to the musical theater stage in 2008 where she played Motormouth Maybelle in a local production of Hairspray also at the CCP.

Her other monikers include "Asia's Diva", "Theme Song Queen", and "Timeless Diva". She has since sung around 30 movie theme songs.

== Personal life ==
Dulce first lived with singer/actor Danny Cruz, with whom she had three children— DJ, David Ezra, and Dana. She then married Bernard Beltran Cruzata II, with whom she has two children— Jemimah and Jedidah. She is now separated and lives happily with her two youngest daughters.

== Discography ==
=== Albums ===
- Dulce (1979, Blackgold Records)
- Sa Mga Awit Binisaya (1981, WEA Records)
- Don't Ever Say Goodbye (1982, WEA Records)
- Langit Ug Yuta (1991, Sunshine Records)
- Saan Patungo ang Bukas (1994, 3:16 Records)
- Daphne & Dulce - Piano & Voice (2021, Spaced Out Records)

=== Compilation albums ===
- Best of Dulce (1990s, Vicor Records)
- Pamasko ng Mga Bituin (2000s, Christmas compilation with APO Hiking Society and others)

=== Singles ===
- Ako Ang Nagwagi (1979) – signature hit; later covered by Eva Eugenio (2010) and Lea Salonga (2004)
- Paano (1979) – originally by Pilita Corrales; Dulce's version became iconic; later covered by Noel Cabangon (2012)
- Maalaala Mo Kaya (1982, duet with Leo Valdez) – originally by Constancio de Guzman (1940)
- Usahay (1970) – Visayan classic; Dulce's rendition popularized it nationally
- Matud Nila (1970) – cover of Ben Zubiri's 1941 kundiman
- From a Distance (2002) – cover of Nanci Griffith's 1987 song, also popularized by Bette Midler
- Forever You Will Be My Song (1990s, from Saan Patungo ang Bukas)
- He Died for Me (1990s, gospel release)
- Our Healing Rest (1990s, gospel release)

== Filmography ==
=== Film ===
Year	Title	Role	Film Company
2010	Emir	Ester	Film Development Council of the Philippines
2017	Ang Larawan	Donya Upeng	Culturtain Musicat Productions
2017	Kamunggai	Kapitana	Universal Harvester Incorporated

=== Television ===
Year	Title	Role	Network
2010–2011	Juanita Banana	Donya Digna Buenaventura	ABS-CBN
2018–2021	Tawag ng Tanghalan sa It's Showtime	Judge	ABS-CBN
2026	Rainbow Rumble	Contestant	Kapamilya Channel; A2Z; ALLTV
