= Maalaala Mo Kaya (song) =

Song by Constancio De Guzman

"Maalaala Mo Kaya" (original title in Spanish: "Dulce princesa") is a song written by Filipino composer Constancio de Guzman for the 1954 film of the same name, which was originally sung by Carmen Rosales.

In 1956, Sylvia La Torre recorded the song and was included in the album Kung Kita'y Kapiling, produced by Villar Records.

It was covered by singers such as the New Minstrels, Pilita Corrales, Eva Eugenio, Leo Valdez, Diomedes Maturan and Ryan Cayabyab.

Though the song was originally written in Spanish, famed Filipino author Guillermo Gómez Rivera is the only artist to record the song in Spanish under the title "Dulce princesa" for his 1960 LP album Nostalgia Filipina.

A cover version by Dulce has been featured by the television drama anthology of the same name, as well as its film counterpart, which was used from the show's premiere in 1991 until 2004, except in the episode, Lobo, which was aired in 2001, where the theme song was covered by Regine Velasquez. The TV show used another cover version, performed by Carol Banawa from 2004 to 2021, and another by JM Yosures from 2021 to 2022 and Sofronio Vasquez and Carmelle Collado since 2025, for its closing credits.

In 2009, it was performed as part of a weekly task in the third season of Pinoy Big Brother, during the "Big Swap" between a housemate and a contestant from Big Brother Finland. The song was performed as a duet between housemate Tom Mott and Big Brother Finland's Kätlin Laas.

In 2015, the song was mentioned in Mitch Albom's book The Magic Strings of Frankie Presto as the song that the title character played for the girl he fell in love with when he was a boy in war-torn Spain in 1944.
