= Waray =

Waray may refer to:

- Waray people of the Philippines
- Waray language, the fifth most spoken native language of the Philippines, spoken by the Waray people
- Waray literature
- Warray language, an Australian language spoken in the Adelaide River area of the Northern Territory
- Waray Sorsogon language, also known as Southern Sorsogon language, a language spoken in the Philippines

== See also ==
- Waray-Waray (disambiguation)
