= José Clímaco =

Filipino director (1906–1985)

- Born: April 6, 1906; Cebu City, Philippine Islands
- Died: October 13, 1985 (aged 79); Quezon City, Philippines
- Resting place: Manila Memorial Park, Parañaque
- Occupation: Film director
- Years active: 1947–1959
- Spouse(s): Lilian Velez (m. 1942; died 1948) Betty Silos (m. 1950; died 1985)
- Children: Vivian Clímaco-Ocampo; Samuel “Sammy” Clímaco; Maria Stella Clímaco-Dickerson

José Clímaco (April 4, 1906 – October 13, 1985) was a Filipino film director.

== Life and career ==
As a budding composer and director, Clímaco spent part of the studying filmmaking in Hollywood by 1939. Upon his return to Manila, he became the manager of a radio station. He met his wife, Lilian Velez, when she won first place in a singing contest sponsored by his station. They were married in 1942 and they had one child named Vivian, born 1944. During the Second World War, Clímaco was briefly arrested by the Japanese and tortured in Fort Santiago.

Climaco joined Filippine Films & Philippine Pictures as a director after World War II. He directed his wife in her film debut, and in several films afterwards which she had starred in with her leading man, the former child actor Narding Anzures. Perhaps the most famous film he made with Velez was Ang Kabukiran, a film inspired by a song composed by his father-in-law and popularized by his wife.

In 1948, Velez was murdered by her co-star Anzures, an event that shocked Manila. Clímaco subsequently joined LVN Pictures as a director, shortly after his wife's death and resumed his filmmaking career. He directed films for LVN until the late 1950s. Among his other films for LVN included Parola, starring Jaime de la Rosa and Norma Blancaflor. Clímaco also indulged in cameo appearances in his own film. He later remarried and had additional children.

== Filmography ==
Year	Title	Role	Production company
1947	Sa Kabukiran (In the Field)		
1947	G.I. Fever		
1949	Parola	Director	LVN Pictures
1949	Tambol Mayor	Director	LVN Pictures
1949	Ang Kandidato (The Candidate)	Director	LVN Pictures
1949	Biglang Yaman (One Day Millionaire)	Director	LVN Pictures
1950	Nagsaulian ng Kandila	Director	LVN Pictures
1951	Nasaan ka, Giliw? (Love, Where are you?)	Director	LVN Pictures
1952	Harana sa Karagatan (Ocean Serenade)	Director	LVN Pictures
1952	Isabelita	Director	LVN Pictures
1953	Awit ng Pag-ibig (Song of Love)	Director	LVN Pictures
1953	Dalawang Pag-ibig (Two Loves)	Director	LVN Pictures
1954	Abarinding	Director	LVN Pictures
1955	Palasyong Pawid (Wood Palace)	Director	LVN Pictures
1955	Karnabal (Carnival)	Director	LVN Pictures
1956	Everlasting	Director	LVN Pictures
1957	Nasaan ka Irog? (Where are you Dear?)	Director	LVN Pictures

== In popular culture ==
- Climaco was portrayed by Joel Torre in crime biopic The Lilian Velez Story: Till Death Do Us Part (1995), starring Sharon Cuneta as Lilian Velez and Cesar Montano as Narding Anzures
