= Waray-Waray (song) =

1953 Filipino folk-pop song

Single by Sylvia La Torre
- Language: Filipino; Waray
- Released: 1953
- Genre: Philippine Folk Music; Pop; OPM
- Length: 3:03
- Label: Villar Records
- Composer: Juan Silos Jr.
- Lyricist: Levi Celerio

Audio sample
- file; help

"Waray-Waray" is a 1953 Filipino folk-pop song associated with the ethnolinguistic identity of the Waray people of Eastern Visayas in the Philippines. The song was written by lyricist and National Artist Levi Celerio and composer Juan Silos Jr., and became widely known through performances by singer Sylvia La Torre during the 1950s. It later became one of the most recognizable novelty and regional songs in Philippine popular music, with subsequent renditions by local artists including Elizabeth Ramsey and international singer Eartha Kitt.

Because the song became a massive cultural phenomenon, it was adapted into a 1954 hit film of the same name, Waray-Waray, directed by F.H. Constantino and produced by LVN Pictures, starring the iconic Filipino love team of Nida Blanca and Nestor De Villa.

== Background ==
Prior to 1953, the song already existed as a traditional regional folk melody of Samar and Leyte, comprising the Eastern Visayas region of the Philippines. The composer of the song is unknown. The Filipino version known today was composed by Juan Lorenzo Silos Jr. with lyrics by National Artist of the Philippines for Music Levi Celerio.

The song is noted for its energetic rhythm and lyrics portraying the perceived bravery, resilience, and assertiveness stereotypically associated with Waray-speaking Filipinos. Sung in a mixture of Tagalog and Waray, “Waray-Waray” contributed significantly to the popularization of the term “Waray-Waray” in mainstream Filipino culture.

Rather than being purely written in the native Waray language, the song was deliberately written in Tagalog to appeal to a nationwide audience. The lyrics specifically address the distinct cultural identity of Waray women. In Philippine pop culture, people from the Eastern Visayas region are historically stereotyped as fearless, tough, and fiercely combative. Celerio incorporated these tropes into the lyrics, turning them into a source of pride and empowerment.

The lines boast of women who do not back down from a fight or run away from danger:

- "Waray-waray, hindi tatakas" ("Waray-waray will never flee")
- "Sa bakbakan, dili mag-urong" ("In fistfights, I don't back out")

== Release ==
=== Original 1954 Version ===
The original rendition was recorded by Sylvia La Torre in 1954 under Villar Records through the album "Waray-Waray" with the song as the title track. Backed by a fast-paced, upbeat musical tempo featuring traditional Filipino string instruments, La Torre’s distinct operatic soprano vocal style gave the comedic and aggressive lyrics a lighthearted, catchy contrast. The single was a massive commercial success, cementing La Torre's status as a versatile radio and recording star who could seamlessly pivot from solemn kundiman ballads to fast-tempo novelty acts. Her interpretation helped popularize the song nationally through radio broadcasts and live stage performances.

=== Eartha Kitt Cover (1965) ===
The song achieved global prominence when American cabaret icon Eartha Kitt incorporated it into her repertoire. Kitt traveled to the Philippines for a series of concerts in the 1960s, where she learned the song phonetically. She officially recorded a live version, which was released in her 1965 live album, Eartha Kitt Live at the Plaza. According to contemporary accounts and historical reviews, Kitt took a particular liking to the track because of its strong, unapologetically feminist theme, which resonated with her own public persona as an empowered and wild diva.

=== Lea Salonga Covers ===
Disney legend and Tony Award-winning Filipino singer-actress Lea Salonga later interpreted the song "Waray-Waray" and it appeared in two studio albums and one live recording album namely: Songs from Home (2004), The Journey So Far: Recorded Live at Café Carlyle' (2011), and Bahaghari (Lea Salonga Sings Traditional Songs of the Philippines) (2017). She also occasionally includes the song in her concerts.

== List of recordings of Waray-Waray ==
“Waray-Waray” later gained wider international recognition through performances and cover versions by both Filipino and foreign artists. Among the most notable international interpreters was American entertainer Eartha Kitt, who incorporated the song into her live repertoire during performances in the United States in the early 1960s.

Year	Artist	Album	Notes	Ref.
1954	Sylvia La Torre	Waray-Waray (album); as a single	Label: Villar Records – MLS 5161; Format: Vinyl, LP, Reissue; Country: Philippines; Genre: Folk, World, & Country; Track 1 - Waray-Waray - 3:03	
1960	Michiko Hamamura	Michiko Hamamura And The Bright Rhythm Boys Of Tokyo	Track 1 - "Waray-Waray" - 03:08; Diamond Record; 1 January 1961; Hong Kong	
1961	Joe Loco	In The Philippines	Genre: Jazz, Latin, Folk, World, & Country; Style: Philippine Classical, Latin Jazz; Year: 1961	
1964	The Fabulous Echoes	Single	Label: Diamond (7) – DIAMOND 218, Diamond (7) – D.218 X 45; Format: Vinyl, 7", 45 RPM; Country: Hong Kong; Released: 1974; Genre: Rock	
1965	Eartha Kitt	Eartha Kitt – In Person At The Plaza (1965)	GNP Crescendo / Stereo; Musical Director: David Saxon; GNPS 2008; Track 3 - Waray Waray (Philippine Islands Song)	
1973	Mabuhay Singers	Bahal Nga Tuba	Track 7 - Waray-Waray; Label: Villar Records – MLS-5362; Format: Vinyl, LP, Stereo; Country: Philippines; Released: 1973; Genre: Folk, World, & Country	
1974	Mabuhay Brass Band	Philippine Music	Track 8; Villar Records	
1980	Imelda Papin	Mel	Track 5 - Waray-Waray; Label: Sunshine – TSP-5303; Format: Vinyl, LP, Album, Stereo; Country: Philippines; Released: Sep 10, 1980; Genre: Pop; Style: Ballad, Vocal	
1984	Asin	Mga Awitin Ng Bayan Kong Pilipinas	Genre: Rock, Folk, World, & Country; Style: Folk Rock; Year: 1984; Label: Ivory Records	
1993	Freddie Aguilar	Minamahal Kita	Label: Alpha Records (3) – ARCD-93-8019; Format: CD; Country: Philippines; Released: 1993; Genre: Rock; Track 8 - Waray-Waray	
1999	Relly Coloma	An Evening of Philippine Music	Track 11; Villar Records; No release date, but registered by Villar Records in 1999	
2004	Lea Salonga	Songs from Home (2004)	Label: Musiko Records – MRCD 232, Musiko Records – 82876 64180 2 6; Format: CD, VCD; Country: Philippines; Released: 2004; Genre: Pop; Track 6 - Waray-Waray medley with Galawgaw	
2006	Eartha Kitt	Eartha Kitt – Live From The Café Carlyle (2006)	Label: DRG Records – 91499; Format: CD, Album; Country: US; Released: 2006; Genre: Jazz, Pop; Style: Easy Listening; Track 7 - Waray-Waray	
2011	Lea Salonga	The Journey So Far: Recorded Live at Café Carlyle' (2011)	Ivory Music; 10 February 2012; Track 12 - Waray-Waray	
2014	Mabuhay Singers	Bugie Wugie	Track 3 - Waray-Waray - 02:54; Villar Records; 3 June 2014	
2017	Lea Salonga	Bahaghari (Lea Salonga Sings Traditional Songs of the Philippines) (2017)	Label: Global Language Project (GLP) Music – GLP1701; Format: CD, Digital; Country: US; Released: 2017; Genre: Folk, World, & Country; Style: Philippine Classical; Track 15 - Waray-Waray	
2020	Nonoy Zuñiga featuring SISA	Single	Single; 2:00; ADC Music Publishing; 11 December 2020	
2020	RJ Jacinto	KundiRock	Track 10 - Waray Waray - 3:44; RJ Productions Inc. 18 December 2020	

== Performances ==
Filipino singer-comedienne Elizabeth Ramsey regularly performed “Waray-Waray” as part of her stage repertoire, and the song became strongly associated with her career. Multiple entertainment and biographical sources identify “Waray-Waray” as one of her trademark songs. However, reliable documentation of an official commercial studio recording by Ramsey is limited. Most verifiable surviving records only point to live television performances and concert renditions.

== Reception ==
Cultural Center of the Philippines considers the song as one of Juan Silos’ most popular novelty works.

== In pop culture ==
The song was heavily broadcast on radio and became an undisputed national hit by mid-1954. This rapid rise to fame is what prompted LVN Pictures to rush the film adaptation into theaters later that same year. The 1954 hit film of the same name, "Waray-Waray" starred Nida Blanca together with her then favorite leading man Nestor de Villa. Nida played a tomboyish girl, a Waray ‘tamed’ by the dashing Nestor. The Waray-Waray movie and the Waray-Waray song are deeply intertwined because the song and its theme inspired the movie, rather than the film inspiring the creation of the song.

The success of both the song and the movie cemented the term "Waray-Waray" (and eventually just "Waray") in the mainstream. It even crossed international borders when legendary American jazz singer Eartha Kitt recorded a high-energy cover of the song in the early 1960s after being charmed by its feminist, "we can fight any battle" themes.

In 2015, Filipino comedienne Melai Cantiveros won the Week 9 challenge on the first season of Philippine television reality competition show Your Face Sounds Familiar, after her Waray-Waray performance while impersonating Elizabeth Ramsey.
