= Gunita =

- Directed by: Manuel Silos
- Produced by: Jose O. Vera
- Starring: Miguel Anzures, Narding Anzures, Dely Atay-atayan
- Distributed by: Sampaguita Pictures
- Release date: 1940
- Country: Philippines
- Language: Tagalog

Gunita is a 1940 Filipino film directed by Manuel Silos and starring Miguel Anzures, Narding Anzures and Dely Atay-atayan.
