= Sarita Pérez de Tagle =

Filipino actress

- Born: October 29, 1986 (age 39); Manila, Philippines
- Occupations: Actress and model
- Years active: 2003–2005
- Father: Bernie Pérez
- Relatives: Sylvia La Torre (grandmother); Anna Maria Perez de Tagle (cousin)

Sarita Pérez de Tagle (born October 29, 1986, in Manila, Philippines) is a Filipina cinema and television actress. She was launched as a member of Star Circle Batch 11, a group of talents managed by the ABS-CBN Talent Center (now known as Star Magic) in 2003.

== Personal life ==
She is the third of six children in a Filipino family of Spanish descent. Daughter of actor Bernie Pérez; she is the granddaughter of singer and actress Sylvia La Torre, and also the cousin of actress Anna Maria Perez de Tagle. She is also the distant niece of Isabel Preysler and distant cousin of Enrique Iglesias, Chabeli Iglesias and Julio Iglesias Jr.

She graduated AB Psychology at the De La Salle University in 2005.

== Early career ==
Sarita appeared in the TV series It Might Be You on ABS-CBN, and in the movies My First Romance (2003) and D' Anothers (2005).
