= Eva Eugenio =

Filipino singer (born 1956)

Eva Eugenio (born January 22, 1956) is a Filipino singer who was active in the late 1970s and early 1980s. She is most famous for the hit song "Tukso". Along with Imelda Papin and Claire de la Fuente, she is dubbed as one of the "Jukebox Queens" of the Philippines.

== Discography ==
=== Albums ===
==== Studio albums ====
- Tukso (Canary Records, 1979)
- Eva (Canary Records, 1980)
- Walang Kapantay: A Collection of Philippine Love Songs (Canary Records, 1980)
- Babae Ako (Canary Records, 1980)
- Ngayon (Canary Records, 1981)
- Haplos (Canary Records, 1982)
- Natuto Na (Aquarius Records, 1986)
- Jukebox Diva (Viva Records, 2010)

==== Compilation albums ====
- The Best of Eva Eugenio (Canary Records, 1980)
- The Best of Eva Eugenio Vol. 2 (Canary Records, 1983)
- The Story of Eva Eugenio (The Ultimate OPM Collection) (EMI Philippines, 2002)

=== Singles ===
- "Ako ang Nauna, Pangalawa Ka Lang"
- "Ako Ba'y Laruan"
- "Ako Noon, Siya Ngayon, Sino Bukas"
- "Ang Tangi Kong Pag-ibig"
- "Ano ang Gagawin (Kapag Wala Ka Na)" (1980)
- "Ano Ba ang Mayroon Siya Na Wala Ako"
- "Aray!" (1982)
- "Babae Ako" (1980)
- "Baka Sakali Lang"
- "Bakit Ka Inibig"
- "Bakit May Ulap ang Landas"
- "Buhay Ko ang Mga Yakap Mo"
- "Dahil sa Isang Bulaklak"
- "Dahil Sa'yo"
- "Daing ng Puso"
- "Diyos Lamang ang Nakakaalam"
- "Gulong ng Palad" (1980)
- "Haplos"
- "Hiling sa Pasko (Magbalik Ka)"
- "Hinahanap Hanap Kita"
- "Hindi Kita Malimot" (1980)
- "Huwag Mong Dayain"
- "Ikakasal Ka Na Pala"
- "Ikaw ang Dahilan"
- "Ikaw ang Mahal"
- "Ikaw Pa Rin"
- "Kabaliwan"
- "Kaligayahang Pansamantala" (1979)
- "Kasalanan Ba"
- "Kasalanan 'Di Ko Pansin"
- "Kataka-taka"
- "Kulang ang Lahat"
- "Kung Mawawala Ka"
- "Kunwari ay Ikaw"
- "Lalaking Disente"
- "Last Train to Happiness"
- "Lihim na Pag-ibig"
- "Maalaala Mo Kaya" (1980)
- "Magdusa Man Ako"
- "Magtitiis Ako"
- "Mahal Mo Ba S'ya"
- "Manlilinlang"
- "Mapagbirong Pag-ibig"
- "Matuto Kang Bumalik"
- "Minamahal Kita, Minamahal Ko Siya" (1980)
- "More Than Words Can Say"
- "Nagkamali"
- "Nagmamahal Ako sa Iyo"
- "Nagmamakaawa"
- "Natuto Na" (1986)
- "Pag-ibig na Walang Dangal" (1979)
- "Pagkakamali"
- "Pandangguhan"
- "Pasko sa Piling ng Iba"
- "Sana'y Akong Mabigo"
- "Sigaw sa Magdamag"
- "Sige, Malaya Ka Na"
- "Sino Ba (Ang Pipiliin Mo)"
- "Sinungaling"
- "Sulat Mo"
- "Taksil sa Sumpaan"
- "Tukso" (1979)
- "Uhaw" (1980)
- "Umaga Na, Wala Ka Pa" (later covered by Imelda Papin in 1999)
- "Walang Kapantay" (1980)
- "Your Kind of Love"
