= Bituing Marikit =

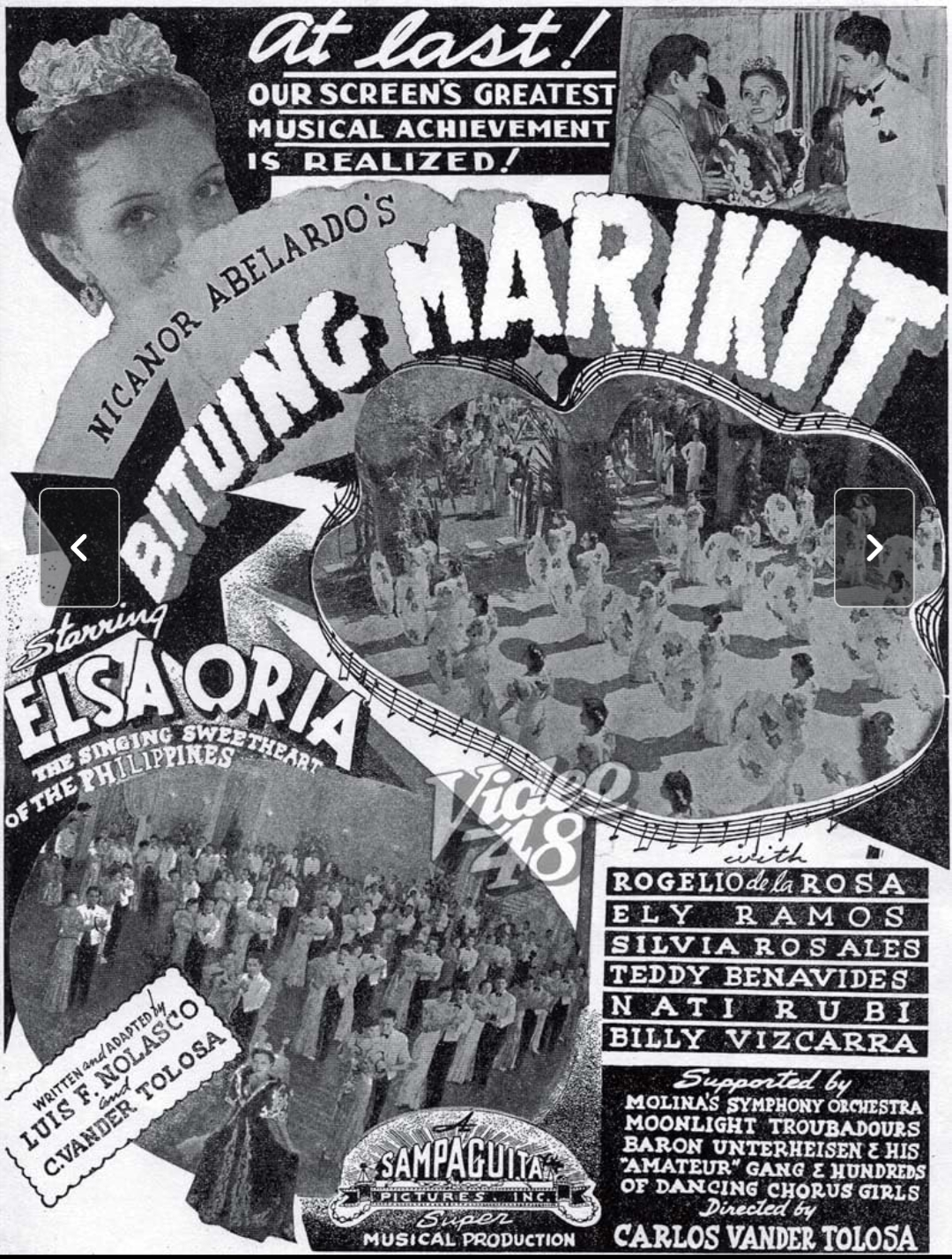
- Directed by: Carlos Vander Tolosa
- Written by: Luis F. Nolasco; Carlos Vander Tolosa
- Produced by: Luis F. Nolasco
- Starring: Elsa Oria; Rogelio de la Rosa
- Production company: Sampaguita Pictures
- Release date: December 12, 1937
- Country: Philippines
- Language: Filipino

Bituing Marikit is the first full-length film produced by Sampaguita Pictures, released in 1937. It starred Elsa Oria and Rogelio de la Rosa. The kundiman Bituing Marikit composed by Nicanor Abelardo was used as the film's theme song. The movie was commercially successful, helping the production company develop more film projects.

== Cast ==
- Rogelio de la Rosa
- Juancho Gutierrez
- Daisy Romualdez
- Elsa Oria
- Sylvia La Torre
