= Priscilla Cellona =

Filipina film actress

- Occupations: Actress, educator
- Years active: 1951–late 1950s
- Known for: LVN Pictures films

Priscilla Cellona is a Filipina film actress, who was active during the 1950s.

Her first starring role was in Pag-asa (1951), directed by National Artist Lamberto V. Avellana and co-starring Armando Goyena. The film marked her emergence as a leading lady under LVN Pictures.

After retiring from acting in the late 1950s, Cellona pursued a career in education. She later became an English instructor at the University of the East.

== Filmography ==
Year	Film	Role	References
1948	Hampas ng Langit		
1949	Parola	Estrella	
1949	Batalyon XIII		
1949	Maria Beles		
1950	Tininti del barrio		
1951	Pag-asa	Celing	
1952	Sa paanan ng Nazareno		
1952	Saykopatik		
1952	Isabelita		
1953	Hijo de Familia		
1953	Dalawang Pag-ibig		
1953	Ganyan lang ang buhay		
1953	Awit ng Pag-ibig		
1954	Pasiya ng Langit		
1954	Mabangong Kandungan		
1954	Dalawang Panata		
1955	Honi sa Gugma		
1955	Tagapagmana		
1955	Lapu-Lapu	Princess Yumina	
