= Dahil sa Iyo =

1938 Filipino kundiman

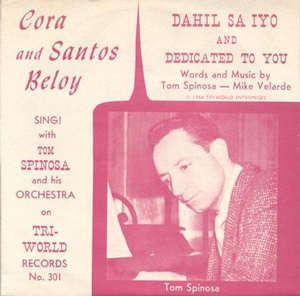

Single by Cora and Santos Beloy, with Tom Spinosa and his Orchestra
- B-side: "Dedicated to You"
- Recorded: 1964
- Genre: Kundiman
- Length: 2:55
- Label: Tri-World Records #301
- Songwriters: Dominador Santiago and Mike Velarde, Jr.

"Dahil sa Iyo" is a 1938 song written for the film Bituing Marikit by Miguel "Mike" Velarde Jr. (1913–1986) and sung by Rogelio de la Rosa. A version with English-Tagalog lyrics, recorded in 1964, was a hit in the United States and continues to be popular in Filipino communities on American soil.

According to notes by Tom Spinosa who wrote one of the multiple sets of English lyrics, while Mike Velarde Jr. owns the copyright, the song was written by Mike's father (also Mike Velarde) in 1936.

One of the most popular examples of the kundiman genre, this "classic Filipino love song" with original Tagalog lyrics has been translated into different languages. The languages it was translated in include English, Spanish, Japanese, Chinese, and other local languages of the Philippines.

Representing an earlier era remembered in nostalgia, it is one of the most popular songs in Tagalog, and a favorite in the Philippines as well as among Filipino communities in Honolulu, on the American West Coast, and in places like Virginia Beach, Virginia. Its popularity in the Philippines is such that some think it ought to replace the current national anthem, and that it be played if former American president Barack Obama had made a state visit to the Philippines. It has been covered many times and is a standard on the repertoire of many artists performing Filipino romantic and popular music. The song's canonical status as a classic Filipino love song was again confirmed by its inclusion on the 2004 hit compilation album Great Filipino Love Songs.

The song is a personal favourite of former First Lady Imelda Marcos, wife of President Ferdinand Marcos. She often sang the song during Ferdinand Marcos' 1965 presidential campaign, and later sang it as a duet with her husband in public gatherings, during her 1992 presidential bid, and performed it as late as July 2000 to wounded soldiers in the Armed Forces of the Philippines Medical Center in Quezon City. In 2008, the song was still associated with her in Manila: "Suddenly, the heads of Peninsula Hotel lobby guests swiveled. Imelda Marcos had walked in. Without missing a beat, hotel musicians struck up 'Dahil sa Iyo.'"

The song is known in the United States because of the Filipino-English lyrics by Tom Spinosa (original lyrics by Dominador Santiago) and Mike Velarde Jr. It was recorded by Cora and Santos Beloy, and released in 1964 by Tri-World Records. This rendition of the song has a 1964 copyright owned by Dexter Music Co. The original composer, Mike Velarde Jr., said: "Sometime in 1960 a famous US singer who made a personal appearance in Manila presented me a contract seeking authority to record 'Dahil Sa Iyo' in the States. The five figure offer was fabulous but I turned it down - simply because she wanted to change the title to an American title. I couldn't, and wouldn't sell the identity we are trying hard to establish. The merits of the song is its identity.'"

This song was famously performed by Nat King Cole at the Araneta Coliseum in Quezon City in 1961. This was also sung by Jerry Vale with English title "Your Love Is Mine" (Eng. lyrics by Sonny Burke) on his album The Language of Love on Columbia Records, released in 1963. The late Malaysian pop singer Surdiman Arshad also sang his few lines sample version during the closing ceremonies in the 1989 SEA Games in Kuala Lumpur, Malaysia, and also one year before Manila hosted the 1991 SEA Games.

== Composition ==
"Dahil Sa Iyo" is a kundiman in 4/4 time. Several recordings of the song begin with a "haunting, symphonic prelude" in a minor key accompanied by a symphony of strings and lyrics about the singer's "hopeless and suffering past". By the second half of the first verse, the song shifts to a major key and introduces a lover rescuing the singer. The song then retains its major key through its two-part chorus. The melody is sung in a "graceful rhythm", according to scholar James Gabrillo.
