= Nita Javier =

Filipina film actress

- Born: 1941 or 1942
- Died: April 6, 2021 (aged 79)
- Occupations: Actress, singer
- Years active: 1950s
- Known for: LVN Pictures films
- Spouse: Rafael Ng (died 1998)

Nita Javier (1941/42 – April 6, 2012) was a Filipina film actress during the 1950s.

== Early life ==
Javier was born in 1941 or 1942 to a Cebuana mother and a Batangueño father. Before entering the film industry, she worked as a teacher in Cebu. A photograph of her was sent to LVN Pictures, where studio head Narcisa de León took interest and invited her to Manila.

== Film career ==
Nita Javier became active in Philippine cinema in the 1950s, appearing in romantic and dramatic films opposite well-known male leads of the era. She starred in several LVN productions, including Ay Pepita, Banda Uno, and Conde de Amor.

Other films credited to her include Limang Dalangin, Ikaw Kasi, Bahala Na, and Handang Matodas.

== Filmography ==
Year	Film	Role	References
1954	Galawgaw		
1954	MN		
1955	Salamangkero		
1955	Banda Uno		
1955	Ang Ibong Adarna		
1955	Saydwok bendor		
1956	Puppy Love		
1956	Handang Matodas		
1956	Charito, I Love You		
1957	Bahala na	Myrna	
1957	Krisalis	Ester	
1957	Conde de Amor		
1957	Cuatro Vidas		
1958	Limang Dalangin		
1958	Casa grande		
1958	Ay Pepita		
1958	Villa Milagrosa		
1959	Tuko sa Madre Kakaw		

== Later life ==
Javier retired from acting in 1959. She married architect Rafael Ng after retirement, with their union lasting until the death of his husband in 1998. In the late 1970s, she pursued formal vocal training under Mercedes Matias Santiago and held a solo recital in 1980 at the Philamlife Auditorium.

== Death ==
Nita Javier died on April 6, 2012, at the age of 79, after battling breast cancer.
