= Michiko Hamamura =

Japanese singer and actress

- Occupations: Actor; Singer
- Notable work: Banana Boat Song

Michiko Hamamura (浜村 美智子, Hamamura Michiko; born October 3, 1938 in Osaka, Japan) is a Japanese singer and actress. She was known as the "Banana Boat Girl" after she recorded a bilingual cover of the "Banana Boat Song".

== Career ==
Her Waray Waray LP was issued on Diamond LP-1002 in 1960/1961. It was credited to Michiko Hamamura & The Bright Rhythm Boys of Tokyo. The instrumental backing was by Cesar Velasco and his Society Orchestra. The album included the Filipino folk-pop song "Waray-Waray" as title track.
