= Lilian Velez =

Filipino actress and singer (1924–1948)

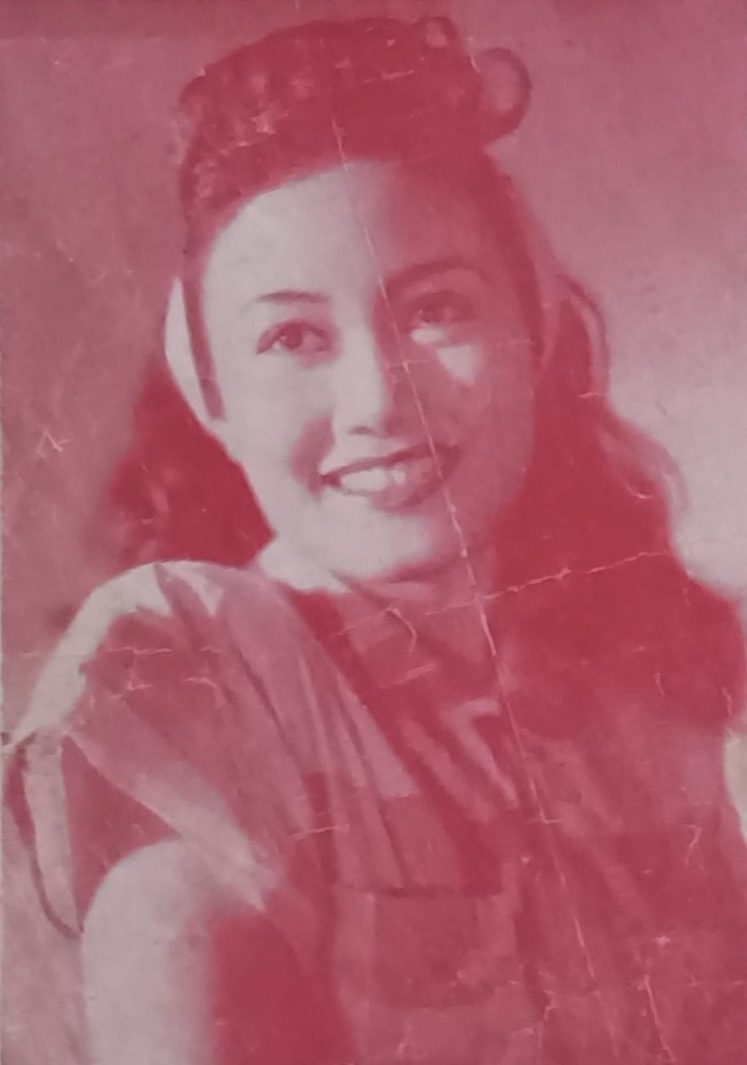
- 1948 promotional photo
- Born: Lilian Cananea Velez; March 3, 1924; Cebu City, Philippine Islands
- Died: June 26, 1948 (aged 24); Quezon City, Philippines
- Cause of death: Multiple stab wounds
- Resting place: Manila North Cemetery
- Occupation: Actress
- Years active: 1935–1948
- Spouse: José Clímaco (m. 1942)
- Children: Vivian Clímaco-Ocampo

Lilian Cananea Velez-Clímaco (March 3, 1924 – June 26, 1948) was a Filipina film actress and singer. Her 1948 murder by fellow actor Narding Anzures was widely covered during the post-war Philippines.

== Career ==
Born in Cebu to composer Manuel Velez and sarsuwela actress Concepcion Cananea, Velez first came into the limelight when she won an amateur radio singing contest in the mid-1930s. Prior to the outbreak of World War II, her singing career thrived, and she popularized one of her father's songs, Sa Kabukiran. Velez also won the heart of Jose Climaco, the manager of the radio station which had sponsored the contest which won her fame. They were married in 1942 and had one daughter named Vivian, born 1944.

Her film career began upon the resumption of Filipino film production after the end of the war. She joined Filippine Films, and with her husband as director, starred in such films as Binibiro Lamang Kita, Ang Estudyante, and Sa Kabukiran, inspired by the song that had earlier earned her fame. Her leading man in these films was Narding Anzures, a former child star.

Her last film appearance was when she joined LVN Pictures, after the success of her previous films produced by Filippine Films. She starred in her first and last movie appearance, which is Enkantada with her new leading man, Jaime de la Rosa. It was released in 1948, the same year of her murder.

== Selected filmography ==
Year	Title	Notes
1948	Enkantada (Sa Mahiwagang Pulo)	LVN Pictures, with her first & last appearance with Jaime De la Rosa and in LVN pictures alone
1947	Sa Kabukiran	Philippine Pictures Inc., also being composed by his own father, Manuel Velez; directed by her husband, Jose Climaco; her last appearance with Narding Anzures; and lastly, made her the most successful movie film ever produced.
1947	Ang Estudyante	Philippine Pictures Inc., second appearance with Narding Anzures
1946	G.I Fever	Philippine Pictures Inc.
1941	Binibiro Lamang Kita	Filippine Films, first being paired with her first on-screen partner, Narding Anzures
1940	Inday	Filippine Films
1939	Naglahong Dambana	Filippine Films

== Personal life ==
Velez had three brothers named Theodoro (a popular craftsman), Cecilio and George (or Jose or Joseph) and two sisters named Gloria and Aida.

== Murder ==
After the success of Sa Kabukiran, LVN Pictures decided to cast Jaime de la Rosa as Velez's leading man in her next film. The decision caused distress on the part of Anzures, who had seemingly become obsessed with the married Velez. At 1:00 am of June 26, 1948, Anzures went to Velez' home at Pulog Street in Santa Mesa Heights, Quezon City. Upon his arrival, he stabbed Velez to death and a housemaid, identified only as Pacita, who had come to her mistress's assistance. The crime was witnessed by Velez's toddler daughter Vivian, who was unharmed during the incident, and another housemaid. Anzures fled to Laguna but later surrendered. At his trial, Anzures pleaded insanity, claiming to have been under a "fantastic spell" when he committed the crime, but later pled guilty and was sentenced to double-life imprisonment and was ordered to pay P5,000 each to the relatives of his victims. The crime and the subsequent trial was a cause célèbre in Manila. Anzures was later pardoned by President Elpidio Quirino but died from tuberculosis shortly after his release; his exact motives for the killings were never determined.

Velez was buried at Manila North Cemetery. Her house in Pulag Street was believed to have been haunted by her spirit until it was demolished to make way for a Buddhist temple.

== Legacy ==
In 1995, the murder of Lilian Velez was the subject of a high-profile film directed by Carlo J. Caparas. Starring Sharon Cuneta as Velez and Cesar Montano as Anzures, the film was one in a string of "true-crime" films churned out by Caparas in the mid-late 1990s.

Velez' diary was posthumously published and released to the general public in 2023.
