= Rosa Aguirre =

Filipino actress (1908–1981)

- Born: January 25, 1908; Laguna, Insular Government of the Philippine Islands, U.S.
- Died: October 9, 1981 (aged 73); Philippines
- Occupation: Actress
- Years active: 1938–1974
- Spouse: Miguel Anzures
- Children: Narding Anzures

Rosa Aguirre (January 25, 1908 – October 9, 1981) was a Filipina actress who worked for Sampaguita Pictures and LVN Pictures. She was married to actor Miguel Anzures and was mother to actor Narding Anzures, who became infamous for killing his onscreen partner Lilian Velez in 1948.

She made her first movie on 1938, Himagsikan ng Puso, with Rudy Concepcion. Aguirre completed 13 movies when World War II broke out. Under X'Otic Pictures and Eiga Hekusa she made one film during the Japanese Occupation, Liwayway ng Kalayaan (Dawn of Freedom). In 1946, she made one war movie Death March under Philippine Pictures Inc., opposite Leopoldo Salcedo, Daily Doble, for Fernando Poe Production in 1947. Aguirre made two movies under Nolasco Bros, Siete Dolores (Seven Sorrows) and Mga Busabos ng Palad (Slaves of Hand). Later, LVN Pictures gave her an exclusive contract until they closed in 1961. She was also a regular on the TV show Si Tatang Kasi.

Aguirre died in 1981 from colon cancer.

== Filmography ==
| Year | Title | Role |
|---|---|---|
| 1938 | Himagsikan ng Puso | |
| 1938 | Mapait na Lihim | |

- 1939 - Pasang Krus
- 1939 - Gabay ng Magulang
- 1939 - Walang Tahanan
- 1939 - Ang Magsasampaguita
- 1939 - Takip-Silim
- 1940 - Magbalik ka, Hirang
- 1940 - Jazmin
- 1940 - Lambingan
- 1940 - Bahaghari
- 1940 - Nang Mahawi ang Ulap
- 1941 - Tampuhan
- 1944 - Liwayway ng Kalayaan
- 1946 - Death March
- 1947 - Daily Doble
- 1947 - Ina
- 1948 - Krus ng Digma
- 1948 - Siete Dolores
- 1948 - Mga Busabos ng Palad
- 1948 - Maestro Pajarillo
- 1949 - Ina ng Awa
- 1949 - Kidlat sa Silangan
- 1949 - Haiskul
- 1949 - Landas ng Buhay
- 1949 - He Promised to Return
- 1950 - Pedro, Pablo, Juan at Jose
- 1950 - Huramentado
- 1950 - Ang Magpapawid
- 1951 - Ang Tapis mo Inday
- 1951 - Satur
- 1951 - Irog, Paalam
- 1951 - Anak ng Pulubi
- 1951 - Bisig ng Manggagawa
- 1951 - Apoy na Ginatungan
- 1951 - La Roca Trinidad
- 1951 - Huling Concierto
- 1951 - Isinanlang Pag-ibig
- 1951 - Pag-asa
- 1952 - Matador
- 1953 - Highway 54
- 1953 - Sa Paanan ng Bundok
- 1954 - Playboy
- 1954 - Batalyon Pilipino sa Korea
- 1954 - Mr. Dupong
- 1955 - Higit sa Lahat
- 1955 - Dalagang Taring
- 1956 - Higit sa Korona
- 1956 - Anak Dalita
- 1957 - Walang Sugat
- 1957 - Sebya, Mahal Kita
- 1957 - Sanga-Sangang Puso
- 1958 - Faithful
- 1958 - Hiwaga ng Pag-ibig
- 1958 - Casa Grande
- 1961 - The Moises Padilla Story
- 1968 - Hari ng Yabang as Tandang Sora
- 1974 - Tinimbang Ka Ngunit Kulang as Lola Jacoba

== In popular culture ==
- Aguirre was portrayed by Boots Anson-Roa in crime biopic The Lilian Velez Story: Till Death Do Us Part (1995), starring Sharon Cuneta as Lilian Velez and Cesar Montano as her son Narding Anzures
