= Sunday Reantaso =

Filipino-American entertainer and social worker

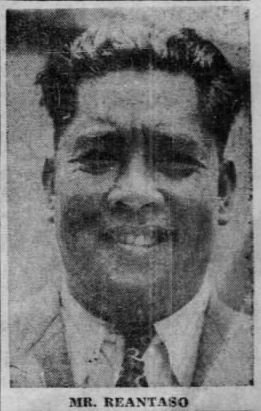
- Born: Domingo Reantaso; July 6, 1898; Oas, Albay, Captaincy General of the Philippines
- Died: May 1, 1948 (aged 49); Honolulu, Territory of Hawaii, U.S.
- Occupations: Vaudeville entertainer and director

Sunday Reantaso (born Domingo Romero Reantaso; July 6, 1898 – May 1, 1948) was a Filipino-American actor, singer, comedian, and stage director who introduced vaudeville (later called "bodabil") to the Philippine audience in 1916. He migrated to Hawaii where he became a social welfare worker and a Filipino community leader.

== Early life ==
Domingo Reantaso was born in Oas, Albay, the son of Estanislao "Wenceslao" Ranido Reantaso and Matea Rastryllo Romero. At the young age of 8, he was sent to New York City to be educated by the Catholic brothers of the Cathedral school of Manhattan.

He returned to Manila to graduate from the then-newly-formed University of the Philippines. Although he was a teacher by profession, he became acquainted with theatrical groups and ventured into the emerging local entertainment industry.

== Theatrical career ==
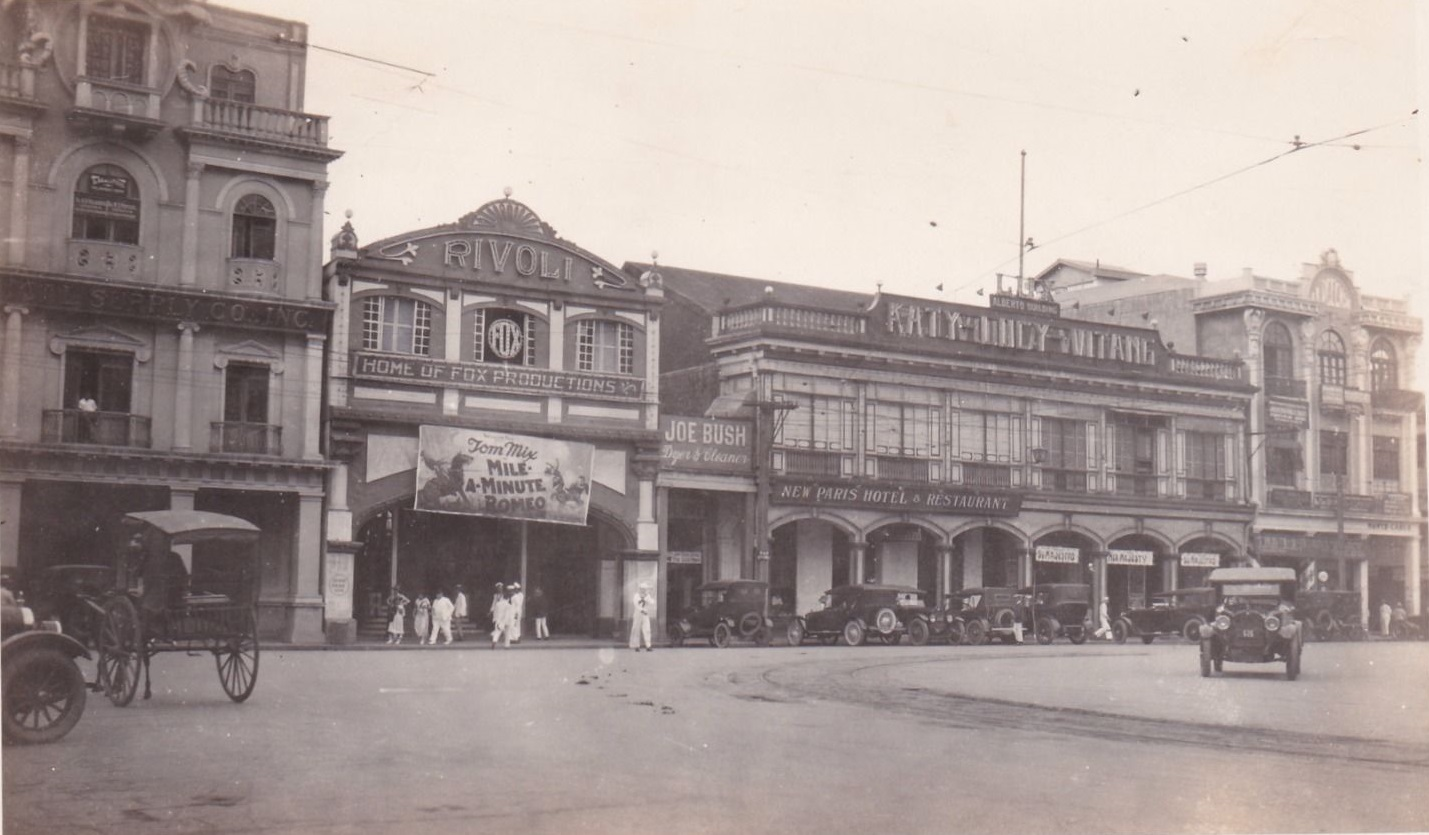
Vaudeville Theaters, Plaza Santa Cruz, Manila, 1923

In 1916, Reantaso started the first Filipino vaudeville company, the Philippine Vaudeville Stars. The troupe's performers include Amanding Montes, Katy de la Cruz, Max Felix, Rafael Cuyugan, and Reantaso himself. He eventually started other companies such as his namesake Sunday Reantaso & Co., the Savoy Nifties, the Variety Stars, the Filipino Supreme Vaudeville Company, the Revue of Revues, and the Manila Nifties. They sang, danced, and entertained Filipinos in the theaters of Manila like the Savoy, Lux, Zorrilla, and Rizal.

"Sorry I'm fat?" cried Sunday Reantaso, the jovial comedian at the Savoy, showing off his famous grin. "I should say not! The fellow who said 'nobody loves a fat man' must have been thin and jealous. Did you ever see a fat man who was lonesome? He's usually the center of attraction. People gravitate towards him because he's jolly. He can't help being that way. Because he's fat no one expects him to run around and do things. They wait on him and he has a fine time of it. He has time to cultivate his sense of humor and everybody gets the benefit of it. True he hasn't the form of Adonis, nor very often his beauty, he doesn't need it. He's a darling of the Gods." The twinkle in Sunday's eye made us think we should take all this with a grain of salt, but when we harked back to his statement that "no one expects him to run around and do things," and we heard his lazy song " I'm Poor, I'm Proud and Particular", we figured that there really must be some reason for the milk being in the coconut.

— "It's Nice To Be Fat," said Savoy Comedian, The Manila Times. 2 March 1925, Page 10

In 1927, the troupe traveled to Hawaii to perform but Reantaso subsequently stayed there.

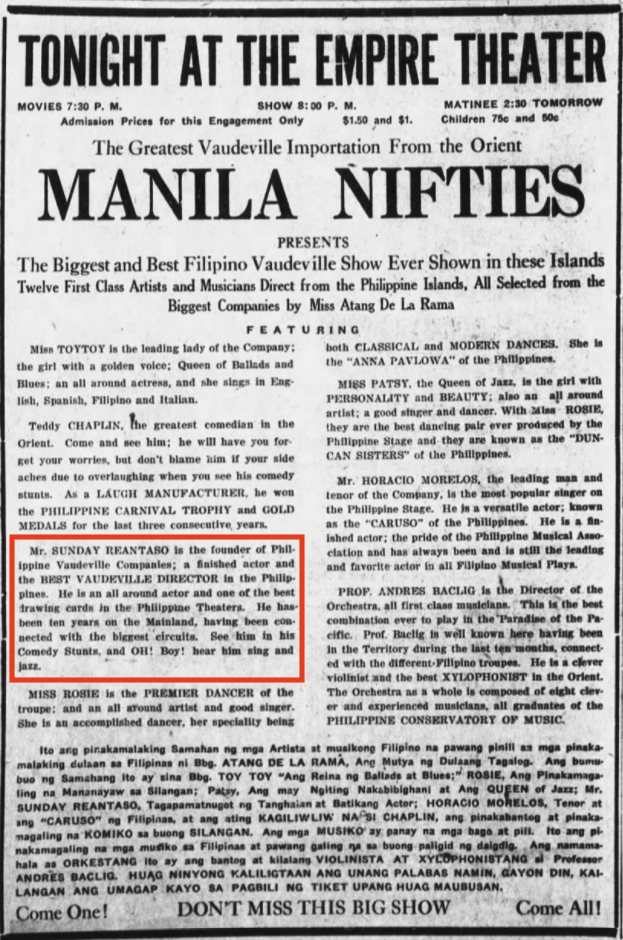
"Best vaudeville director in the Philippines". Manila Nifties newspaper ad in Hawaii, 1927

== Life in Hawaii ==
Reantaso worked as a boxing announcer and promoter for a few years. He was called the "Tex Rickard of Maui".

Sunday Reantaso, matchmaker and fight promoter of Maui, is one of those regular guys who always carry a smile with him wherever he goes… He can get the crowd back of him faster than anybody we know. He needs no loud speakers or megaphones, but every one at the stadium heard every word he uttered, English, American, Filipino and otherwise.

— Honolulu Star-Bulletin. 21 Aug 1930, Page 16

He became active in the Filipino community in Hawaii, holding several positions in organizations such as the Territorial Filipino Council, Timarau Club, Filipino Dramatic Club, and Kauai Filipino Club. He continued organizing entertainment events and festivities, even directing the mobile entertainment group of the United Service Organization.

In 1942, he was drafted into the military when the United States joined the war after the attack on Pearl Harbor. He was later promoted to Captain, then eventually to the rank of Major.

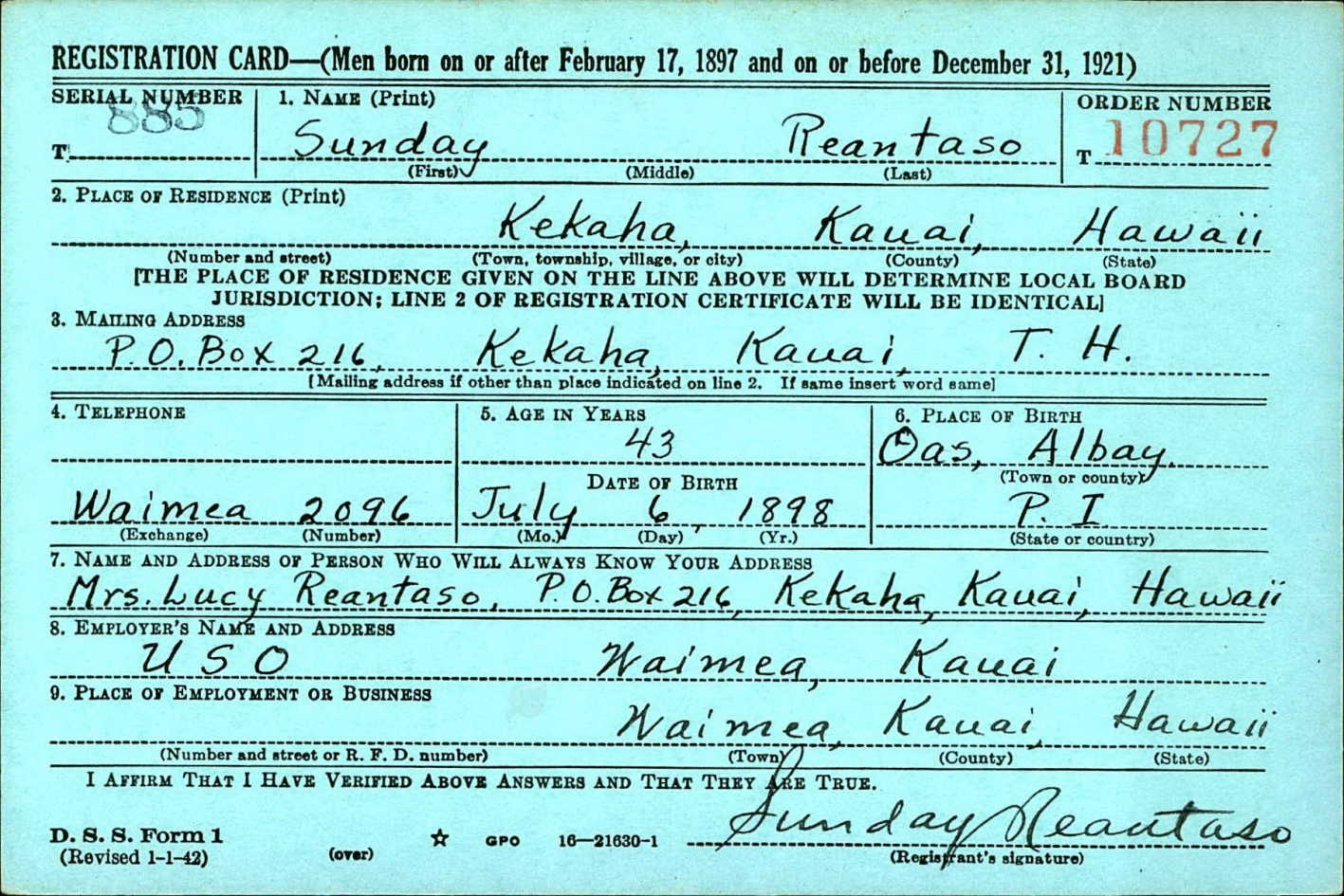
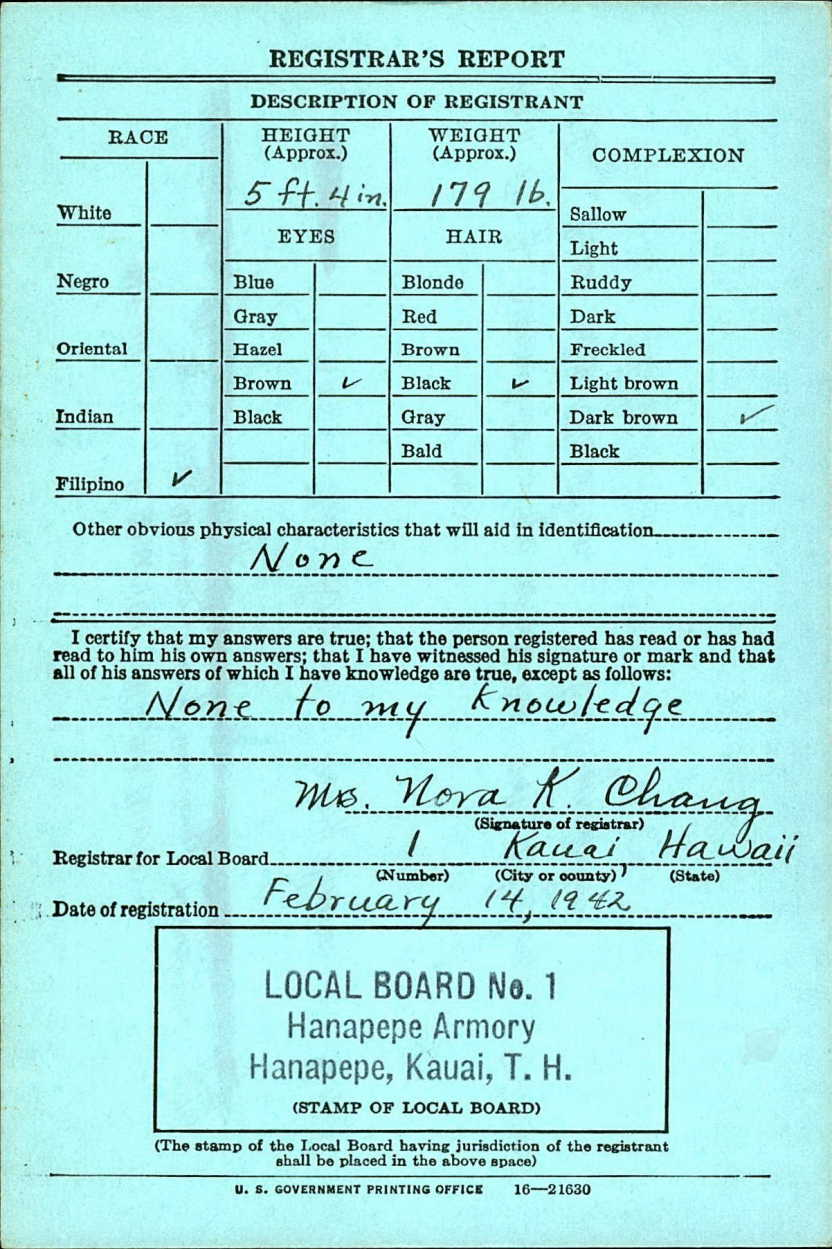
Sunday's military registration card

After 20 years of civic activity, he was granted American citizenship in June 1947.

== Personal life and death ==
Reantaso was the eldest of his siblings Getulio "Uyong", Severino, Sesinando "Dandoy", Antonia "Tuning", and Beatrice "Bating". He had his first son (Alfredo "Fred") in Manila, and had four children (Andrew "Andy", Carmen, Marie Dominic "Ruth Ann", and Thomas) with his wife in Hawaii, Lucy Novite Silva.

On the night of Friday, April 30, 1948, Reantaso walked into Queen's hospital, asked the attendant to call his doctor, and then suddenly collapsed. He died at 3:30 am the next day.

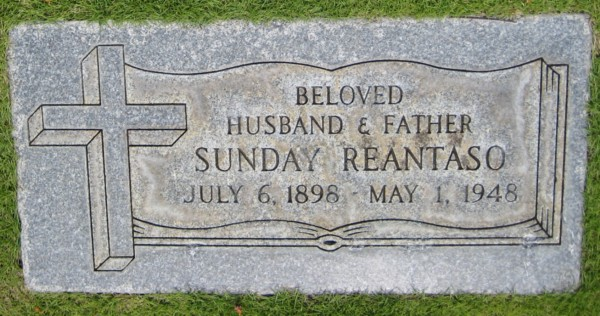
Sunday's tombstone in Diamond Head Memorial Park, Honolulu, Hawaii

== See also ==
- Bodabil
- Luis Borromeo
- Katy de la Cruz
- Atang de la Rama
- Manila Grand Opera House
- Sakadas
- Filipinos in Hawaii
