= Huling Patak ng Dugo =

- Directed by: Nardo Vercudia
- Starring: Pancho Magalona; Alicia Vergel; Eddie Garcia; Chichay; Cesar Ramirez; Tolindoy; Rosa Mia
- Distributed by: Sampaguita Pictures
- Release date: August 13, 1950
- Country: Philippines
- Language: Tagalog

Huling Patak ng Dugo (lit: Last Drop of Blood) is a 1950 Philippine drama film directed by Nardo Vercudia. It stars Pancho Magalona and Alicia Vergel with Bert Olivar, Rosa Mia, Jaime Castellvi, Chichay and Tolindoy, introducing Cesar Ramirez.

== Cast ==
- Pancho Magalona
- Alicia Vergel
- Chichay
- Eddie Garcia
- Cesar Ramirez
- Tolindoy
- Bert Olivar
- Rosa Mia
- Jaime Castellvi
