= Lambingan =

- Directed by: Lorenzo P. Tuells
- Distributed by: Sampaguita Pictures
- Release date: 1940
- Country: Philippines
- Language: Tagalog

Lambingan is a 1940 Filipino film directed by Lorenzo P. Tuells. It stars Rosa Aguirre, Rogelio de la Rosa and Carmen Rosales.
