= Chicháy =

Filipina comedian

- Born: Amparo Robles Custodio; January 21, 1918; Tondo, Manila, Philippine Islands
- Died: March 31, 1993 (aged 75); Manila, Philippines
- Resting place: Loyola Memorial Park - Marikina, Philippines
- Occupations: Actress, comedian
- Years active: 1949–1993
- Spouse: Hercules Saenz Moya (m. 1945)

Amparo Robles Custodio-Moya (January 21, 1918 – March 31, 1993), known professionally as Chicháy, was a Filipina comedian and actress. Her short and stocky stature, scratchy voice, and prematurely-aged appearance allowed her to portray grandmothers while only in her thirties.

== Biography ==
=== Early life ===
She was born in Tondo, Manila, the daughter of a ship steward, Jose Pacifico Custodio and Maria Robles of Bulacan.

=== Career ===
She entered show business as a teen, joining the "Samahang Antonieta" as a singer with her sister Iluminada. She also appeared as a chorus line dancer at the bodabil shows of Katy de la Cruz. Soon a regular at the bodabil circuit, she received her stage name "Chichay" from Atang de la Rama. The name was a corruption of the Japanese word "Chiisai", meaning "short", in reference to Chichay's own short height and she got famous for her toothless appearance but in reality she still got 2 molars left.

Chichay appeared in her first film, Sampaguita Pictures's Huwag Ka Nang Magtampo, in 1949. She became a star in 1953 after appearing in Gorio and Tekla, opposite Tolindoy. In the next decade, Chichay and Tolindoy became a popular comic duo, often paired together in films.

In 1954, the 36-year-old Chichay was cast as the over-protective grandmother of Fred Montilla's title role, Bondying, an adaptation of a comic character created by Mars Ravelo. Chichay would make two more Bondying films with Montilla. Remarkably, thirty-five years after the first Bondying film, Chichay would be called upon to play the very same role in the Viva Films remake starring Jimmy Santos.

In 1962, she shared equal billing with other comediennes in Pitong Atsay (1962) as a rebellious canteen servant. It was a box-office riot that a sequel was released, Pitong Atsay Strikes Again (1963). Also she played the comic-villainess, "Alupihan" in Tarsan vs. Tansan (1963) with Dolphy and Vic Vargas.

Chichay remained a contract star with Sampaguita Pictures for almost two decades. After her stint with Sampaguita, she remained in demand as a character actress, often in comic roles. In 1972, she was nominated for a FAMAS Best Supporting Actress award for her role in Bilanguang Puso. She also played support to the country's top actresses — Vilma Santos in Yakapin Mo 'ko, Lalaking Matapang (1980), Nora Aunor in Darling, Buntis Ka na Naman (1978) and Totoo ba ang Tsismis (1980), Sharon Cuneta in Forgive and Forget (1982). She also starred with Fernando Poe Jr. and Susan Roces in No Retreat... No Surrender... Si Kumander (1987).

=== TV career ===
Chichay appeared in television shows in the 1960s when she played support to Nida Blanca and Nestor de Villa in the variety show The Nida-Nestor Show (1969–72). She would provide the laugh antics in between the skits, the sing and dance potions. Other credits include the title role: first in Mrs. Milyonarya (1971–72) on ABS-CBN 2, later renamed as Ginang Milyonarya (1973–75) over BBC-2 with Rudy Manlapaz as her clumsy driver. The witchy mom-in-law of Pancho Magalona in Ang Biyenan kong Mangkukulam (1977–78), the old fashioned granny of Bing Pimentel in Ang Lola kong Baduy (1977–78), Nida Blanca's mom in Mana-Mana Yan (1978) the temperamental canteen owner, Aling Farah Pusit in the kiddie show, Kaluskos Musmos (1978–81) and as "La Ching" in 2 + 2 = Gulo (1982–86) with Vic Sotto, Maricel Soriano, and Herbert Bautista. Her last known TV show was Chicks for Cats (1987).

== Personal life ==
In 1945, she married Hercules Saenz Moya of Iloilo.

== Final roles and death ==
In March 1993, Chichay died at age of 75. Among her last roles was as Lola Basyang in the 1986 Regal Films fantasy movie, Mga Kuwento ni Lola Basyang. She was posthumously awarded a star on the Eastwood City Walk of Fame in 2017.

== Filmography ==
- 1948 - Itanong mo sa Bulaklak [Premiere]
- 1949 - Carmencita Mia [Par]
- 1949 - Kung Sakali ma't Salat [Bayani]
- 1950 - Huwag ka ng Magtampo! - Sampaguita Pictures
- 1950 - Kilabot sa Makiling - Sampaguita Pictures
- 1950 - Mga Baguio Cadets - Sampaguita Pictures
- 1950 - Huling Patak ng Dugo - Sampaguita Pictures
- 1950 - Kulog sa Tag-araw - Sampaguita Pictures
- 1951 - Anghel ng Pag-ibig - Sampaguita Pictures
- 1952 - Rebecca - Sampaguita Pictures
- 1952 - Barbaro - Sampaguita Pictures
- 1952 - Madam X - Sampaguita Pictures
- 1952 - Kerubin - Sampaguita Pictures
- 1952 - Buhay Pilipino - Sampaguita Pictures
- 1953 - Ang Ating Pag-ibig - Sampaguita Pictures
- 1953 - Gorio at Tekla - Sampaguita Pictures
- 1953 - Cofradia - Sampaguita Pictures
- 1953 - Tulisang Pugot - Sampaguita Pictures
- 1953 - Mister Kasintahan - Sampaguita Pictures
- 1954 - Ukkala - Sampaguita Pictures
- 1954 - Nagkita si Kerubin at si Tulisang Pugot - Sampaguita Pictures
- 1954 - Ang Biyenang Hindi Tumatawa - Sampaguita Pictures
- 1954 - Anak sa Panalangin - Sampaguita Pictures
- 1954 - Bondying - Sampaguita Pictures
- 1955 - Tatay na si Bondying - Sampaguita Pictures
- 1955 - Artista - Sampaguita Pictures
- 1955 - Uhaw sa Pag-ibig - Sampaguita Pictures
- 1955 - Sa Dulo ng Landas - Sampaguita Pictures
- 1955 - Waldas - Sampaguita Pictures
- 1955 - Bim Bam Bum - Sampaguita Pictures
- 1956 - Chavacano - Sampaguita Pictures
- 1956 - Rodora - Sampaguita Pictures
- 1957 - Busabos - Sampaguita Pictures
- 1958 - Zorina [Champion]
- 1958 - Ang Nobya kong Igorota [Champion]
- 1959 - Handsome - Sampaguita Pictures
- 1962 - No Man Is an Island - Gold Coast Pictures
- 1962 - Pitong Atsay - Dalisay Pictures
- 1962 - Ang Pinakamalaking Takas ng Pitong Atsay - Dalisay Pictures
- 1985 - Working Boys - Viva Films
- 1985 - Mga Kwento ni Lola Basyang - Regal Films

== In popular culture ==
- Singer and actress Zephanie Dimaranan portrayed her on GMA Network’s 2024 war drama television series Pulang Araw.

== Notes ==
- Malou Maniquis; Galileo Atienza (1994). "Philippine Film". In Nicanor Tiongson (ed.). CCP Encyclopedia of Philippine Art. Vol. VIII (1st ed.). Manila: Cultural Center of the Philippines. p. 219. ISBN 971-8546-31-6.
