= Katy! the Musical =

Filipino biographical musical

Katy!
- The Musical
- Productions: 1988 Makati; 1989 Manila; 2013 Manila; 2013 Pasig (rerun)

Katy! the Musical is a Filipino–language biographical musical based on the life of Katy de la Cruz, considered the "Queen of Philippine vaudeville and jazz" with music by Ryan Cayabyab and story and libretto by Jose Javier Reyes.

== Synopsis ==
=== Act 1 ===
Scene 1

Back at their residence, Tatay is confronted by Katy's teacher regarding her attitude at school. It turns out that young Katy is not focused in her studies; rather, she is prone to playing around with her schoolmates. After the teacher finishes her speech, Tatay tells her that he will discipline his daughter regarding the issue, only to end up in shock when he finds out that his daughter has been kicked out of school. When Tatay angrily calls for young Katy, she is found to be hiding in the chest again. Tatay scolds Katy for being hard-headed and tells her that nothing will happen for her if she continues to act this way. Young Katy tells her dad that she will sing instead, since she is good at it and that she makes a lot of money. As they continue their bantering, an Empresario (Spanish for Entrepreneur) enters the scene and asks Tatay if he could hire the young Katy to be a singer.

Scene 2

The scene quickly changes to a cockfighting arena, where the young Katy performs for the people ("Tupada"). As the song ends and she starts to collect the loose change they throw at her, a rich man gives her a 20 peso bill for her performance. Shocked, she tries to return the money to the man, but he insists that the money is for her. Young Katy then screams and proceeds to run home to her father, telling him that they will be rich.

Scene 3

At the cinema, Tatay is standing behind the curtain, still trying to convince the now 15-year-old Katy to pursue something else other than performing. Teen Katy tells her father that she is making more money now and that she can afford to buy her parents anything they want. Tatay explains to Katy the difficulties in the theater life, especially for women. Katy then tells her dad to not worry, and that the both of them can take on any challenges that lie ahead. They are interrupted by a voice telling Katy that it's her turn to sing again. After her performance, she goes back to where Tatay is standing. Tatay then tells her that an American came by to ask him if Katy could perform in Teatro Lux. When Katy starts to get excited again, Tatay tells her that she needs to learn the songs and their lyrics.

Scene 4

At Teatro Lux, Katy, now a woman, is being watched by the amused cast and crew of the theater while singing ("St. Louie Blues")

== Musical number ==
Act I

- "Ang Entablado ay Mundo" – Katy and Chorus
- "Tale, Tale" – Tatay and Young Katy
- "Pahiram ng Kanta" – Young Katy
- "Tupada" – Young Katy
- "Tale, Tale" (Reprise) – Tatay and Teen Katy
- "Pahiram ng Kanta" (Reprise) – Teen Katy
- "Bituing Tahimik" – Hanna, Patsy and Katy
- "Sari-saring Babae" – Patsy, Hanna, Mary and Peping
- "Minsan ang Minahal Ay Ako" – Olivia and Katy
- "Makisig" – Patsy and Hanna
- "Awit Ko Para Sa Iyo" – Katy and Peping
- "Laruan Kong Langit" – Olivia and Katy
- "Tanan" – Hanna, Patsy and Katy
- "Balut" – Katy

Act II

- "Saging" – Katy
- "Luha sa Kinalimutang Lupa" – Olivia and Chorus
- "Aba, ba, ba, Boogie" – Katy and Chorus
- "Tingnan Mo Nga Naman" – Tatay and Katy
- "Pasayaw-sayaw Na May Pakpak at Belo" – Dolphy and Two Dancers
- "Isa Na Namang Paalam" – Peping and Katy
- "Basta’t Masasayaw" – Katy and Chorus
- "Bumalik Ka Man, O Hindi" – Katy and Chorus
- "Give Me A Song" – Katy
- "Minsan Ang Minahal Ay Ako" – Katy and whole Cast

== Main characters ==
Character	1988	2013	2013 (Rerun)
Katy	Mitch Valdez	Isay Alvarez	Isay Alvarez
Teen Katy	Pam Gamboa Petersen	Aicelle Santos	Aicelle Santos
Young Katy	Tenten Muñoz	Yedda Lambujon / Leana Tabunar	Yedda Lambujon / Leana Tabunar
Olivia	Celeste Legaspi	Dulce	Dulce
Tatay	Bernardo Bernardo	Tirso Cruz III	Tirso Cruz III
Peping	Marco Sison	Gian Magdangal	Gian Magdangal
Dolphy	Robert Seña	Epy Quizon	Epy Quizon
Hanna	Pinky Marquez	Tricia Jimenez	Tricia Jimenez
Patsy	Arlene Borja	Celine Fabie	Celine Fabie
Mary	Gigi Posadas	CJ Mangahis	CJ Mangahis

== Productions ==
Production	Location	Opening Night	Closing Night
1988 Actors Studio East production	Rizal Theater, Makati		
1989 GR Creative production	Cultural Center of the Philippines, Manila		
2013 Spotlight Artists Centre production	Cultural Center of the Philippines, Manila	January 17	January 27
2013 Spotlight Artists Centre production	Meralco Theater, Pasig	July 25	August 4

== Dancers, 1989 Cultural Center of the Philippines Production ==
- Mary Faith Abano
- Fara Dina Aquino
- Maristela Balbalosa
- Charlie Binias
- Paul Castillos
- Carolina Claro
- Oscar Dizon
- Ricky Mansarate
- Girly Mateo
- Jimmy Mateo
- Cherry Mojica
- Renato Salonga
- Elissa Venturina
