= Alicia Vergel =

Filipino actress

- Vergel in 1960
- Born: Erlinda Gaerlan Asturias; June 7, 1927; Ermita, Manila, Philippine Islands
- Died: May 20, 1992 (aged 64); Philippines
- Resting place: Garden Of The Divine Word, Christ the King Mission Seminary, Quezon City
- Occupation: Actress
- Spouse: Cesar Ramirez (m. 1953)
- Children: 5 (inc. Ace and Beverly)

Alicia Vergel (born Erlinda Gaerlan Asturias-Aguilar; June 7, 1927 – May 20, 1992), was a Filipino actress, film producer, entrepreneur and politician. She was known for playing fiesty, strong-willed characters and was famous for her portrayals in films of varying genres. She was the first recipient of FAMAS Award for Best Actress and Maria Clara Award for Best Supporting Actress.

== Early career ==
Vergel's film credits include Diwani opposite César Ramirez, MN with Carmen Rosales as her arch-enemy, Balisong with Ramon Revilla and Madame X with Gloria Romero as her daughter. She participated in the unfinished film Bibingka'y Masarap under Sampaguita Pictures in the late 40s. Her performance as Orang in Basahang Ginto won Vergel the first FAMAS Award for Best Actress in 1952.

In 1977, she starred as the widowed and retired principal and teacher coping up with the demands of aging in Lotus Productions' Inay directed by Lino Brocka. The film was an entry in the Metro Manila Film festival and earned her an acting nomination for lead actress.

In the 1987 film Saan Nagtatago ang Pag-ibig?, she portrayed the role of Señora Pacing as Ricky Davao's aristocratic and strict grandmother.

== Politics ==
In 1986, Vergel campaigned for the reelection of president Ferdinand Marcos in the 1986 snap election.

During the late 1980s until the early 1990s, Vergel was barangay captain in Barangay Manresa, Quezon City.

== Personal life and death ==
Vergel had a child, Tomas Aguilar, known as "Boy Vergel" who was killed in a notorious street fight in 1962.

She then married Sampaguita Pictures' leading man César Ramirez. They had two children: Ace Vergel and Beverly Vergel, actress, acting teacher and currently director of the ABS-CBN Center for Communication Arts, Inc. Vergel and Ramirez separated; Vergel married another man and had another child, Mike.

Vergel died of natural causes on May 20, 1992, she was 64.

== Legacy ==
She was posthumously inducted to the Eastwood City Walk of Fame Philippines in December 2006.

== Filmography ==
- 1937 - Teniente Rosario
- 1949 - Bibingka'y Masarap (unreleased)
- 1949 - Milagro ng Birhen ng mga Rosas
- 1949 - Teniente Ramirez
- 1950 - Huling Patak ng Dugo
- 1950 - Mapuputing Kamay
- 1951 - Bernardo Carpio as Luningning
- 1952 - Basahang Ginto as Orang
- 1952 - Hiram na Mukha
- 1952 - Madame X
- 1953 - Diwani
- 1954 - Aristokrata as Marieta Solomon
- 1954 - Eskandalosa
- 1954 - MN as Ada
- 1954 - Ukala: Ang Walang Suko
- 1955 - Artista
- 1955 - Balisong
- 1955 - Kuripot
- 1955 - Lupang Kayumanggi
- 1955 - Mambo-Dyambo
- 1956 - Taong Putik
- 1957 - Kahariang Bato
- 1957 - Maskara
- 1958 - Anak ng Lasengga
- 1958 - Cavalry Command as Laura
- 1958 - Obra Maestra (segment "Macao")
- 1960 - Kadenang Putik
- 1961 - Konsiyerto ng Kamatayan (segment "Noche Azul")
- 1965 - Tagani
- 1976 - Tatlong Kasalanan
- 1977 - Inay as the title character
- 1985 - Jandro Nakpil: Halang ang Kaluluwa
- 1985 - Victor Lopez Jr.
- 1987 - Saan Nagtatago ang Pag-Ibig?
- 1988 - Isusumbong Kita sa Diyos
- 1989 - Bakit Iisa Lamang ang Puso?
- 1990 - Mundo Man Ay Magunaw
