= Baylon =

Baylon is a surname. Notable people with the surname include:

- Ernst Baylon (1903–?), Austrian fencer
- Jair Baylón (born 1989), Peruvian footballer
- John Baylon (born 1965), Filipino judoka
- Julio Baylón (1950–2004), Peruvian footballer
- Luren Baylon (born 1977), Peruvian volleyball player
- Nelly Baylon (1937–1950s), Filipino actress
- Norma Baylon (born 1942), Argentinian tennis player
- Oscar Baylón Chacón (1929–2020), Mexican politician
- Paschal Baylón (1540–1592), Spanish friar
- Sandro Baylón (1977–2000), Peruvian footballer
- Terence Baylon (born 1984), Filipino actor and model
