= Balisong =

Balisong may refer to:

- Butterfly knife, a Philippine knife
- Balisong (film), a 1955 Philippine film
- "Balisong" (song), a 2003 song by Rivermaya
