= Balisong (film) =

- Starring: Alicia Vergel; Ramon Revilla
- Distributed by: Sampaguita Pictures
- Release date: 1955
- Country: Philippines
- Language: Tagalog / Filipino

Balisong (Folding Knife) is a 1955 Filipino film produced by Sampaguita Pictures. The film is in black and white.

== Cast ==
- Alicia Vergel as mother of Ace Vergel
- Ramon Revilla as father of Jolo Revilla
