= Bakit Kinagat ni Adan ang Mansanas ni Eba? =

Bakit Kinagat ni Adan ang Mansanas ni Eba
- Official movie poster
- Directed by: Mike Relon Makiling
- Screenplay by: Arsenio "Matanghari" Liao
- Produced by: Jimmy C. Yu
- Starring: Dolphy; Beverly Vergel
- Cinematography: Ben Lobo
- Edited by: Ruben 'Tikboy' Natividad
- Music by: Dominic
- Production company: Urban Films
- Release date: 1988
- Country: Philippines
- Language: Filipino

Bakit Kinagat ni Adan ang Mansanas ni Eba (transl. Why Did Adam Bite Eve's Apple?) is a 1988 Filipino slapstick comedy film directed by Mike Relon Makiling and written by Arsenio 'Matanghari' Liao, partially inspired by the story of Adam and Eve.

== Plot ==
The story revolves around Ambo, who portrays the typical middle-aged Filipino alpha male. All the women from the small town adore him, but he clearly shows no interest until he saw the woman of his dreams named Evelyn. Ambo tries to court Evelyn, but winning her heart seems impossible. Eventually, Ambo succeeds but quickly discovers a downside to Evelyn – she refuses to have sex with Ambo for fear of becoming pregnant. After some shenanigans, they eventually get to consummate the marriage, but Ambo instead winds up becoming pregnant.

== Cast ==
- Dolphy as Ambo
- Beverly Vergel as Evelyn
- Panchito Alba as Tiago
- Che-Che Sta. Ana as Tiago's daughter
- Nova Villa as Luming
- Eric Francisco as Eric
- Fatima Alvir as Gigi
- Moody Diaz as Desta
- Zorayda as Dory
- Beverly Salviejo as Bronson
- Whitney Tyson as Kekay Tyson
- Rene Requiestas as Sacristan
- Bert Mansueto as Wilmor
- Babalu as Doctor
- Conde Ubaldo as Father Conde
- Bobby Zshornack as Justin
- Lou Veloso as Snake
- Miniong Alvarez as Guitarist
- Flora Gasser as Nurse

== Themes ==
The movie featured Filipino practices such as the Harana (serenade) and Panliligaw (courtship), and the popular Filipino serenade O Ilaw (Oh Light).

== Production ==
- Lita Santos (line producer)
- Consolacion M. Yu (associate producer)
- Maria N. Yu (associate producer)
- JImmy C. Yu (associate producer)
