= Beverly Vergel =

Filipino actor, director and producer (born 1964)

- Born: April 11, 1964 (age 62); Manila, Philippines
- Occupations: Actress, director, producer, writer
- Years active: 1988–present
- Children: Tracy
- Parents: César Ramirez (father); Alicia Vergel (mother)
- Relatives: Ace Vergel (brother)

Beverly Vergel (born April 11, 1964) ia Filipino-Canadian actress and film writer, director and producer, who now lives and works in Canada after many screen appearances in the Philippines during the 1980s and 1990s.

== Biography ==
She was born in Manila, Philippines to actors César Ramirez and Alicia Vergel. She is younger sister to actor Ace Vergel. Her daughter Tracy Vergel was a former actress.

In 1988, she starred opposite Dolphy in Bakit kinagat ni Adan ang Mansanas ni Eba. From 1992 to 1997, she played the role of Almira del Valle, the biological mother of the protagonist Mara, in the television series Mara Clara. She later worked at TV channel GMA-7 as a scriptwriter and director, and at ABS-CBN as an executive producer and managing director. She directed her first film, Living Instead, in 2016, and won awards at independent film festivals in Canada, Spain and the US.

== Filmography ==
=== Film ===
==== As actor ====
- Ang Anino ni Asedillo (1988)
- Alega Gang: Public Enemy No.1 of Cebu (1988)
- Ambush (1988)
- Jockey Tyan (1988)
- Smith & Wesson (1988)
- Bakit Kinagat ni Adan ang Mansanas ni Eba? (1988)
- Code Name: Black and White (1988)
- Kahit Ako'y Tupang Itim, May Langit Rin (1988)
- Handa Na ang Hukay Mo, Calida (1989)
- Baril Ko ang Uusig (1990)
- Sgt. Patalinghug: CIS Special Operations Group (1990)
- Kolehiyala (1990)
- Bala at Rosaryo (1990)
- Lover's Delight (1990)
- Gobernador (1992)
- Moises Arcanghel: Sa Guhit ng Bala (1996)
- Melencio Magat: Dugo Laban Dugo (1996)
- Mara Clara: The Movie (1996)

==== As director ====
- Living Instead (also writer, 2016)
- W'at Abowt Us (2019)

=== Television ===
==== As actor ====
- Anna Luna
- Maalaala Mo Kaya (2 episodes, 1991–1994) – Various
- Mara Clara (1992–1997) – Almira Del Valle
- Gimik (1996–1999) – Dianne's mother

==== As director ====
- Maalaala Mo Kaya (Episode: "Guho", 1996)

==== As executive producer ====
- Star Drama Theater Presents: Claudine (1997)

== Awards ==
- 2016 – Barcelona Planet Film Festival: Best Woman Filmmaker for Living Instead
- 2016 – Canadian Diversity Film Festival: Best director for Living Instead
- 2016 – Los Angeles Film Awards: Honorable Mention: First Time Director for Living Instead
