= Katy de la Cruz =

Filipina singer (1907–2004)

- Born: Catalina Mangahas de la Cruz; February 13, 1907; Bustos, Bulacan, Philippine Islands
- Died: November 10, 2004 (aged 97); San Francisco, California, U.S.
- Occupation: Singer
- Years active: 1914–1980s
- Spouse: Jose Yoingco
- Awards: FAMAS Best Supporting Actress; 1953 Inspirasyon

Katy de la Cruz (born Catalina Mangahas de la Cruz; February 13, 1907 – November 10, 2004) was a leading Filipina singer who specialized in jazz vocals and torch songs in a long career that lasted eight decades. Hailed as "The Queen of Filipino Jazz" and as "The Queen of Bodabil", she was, by the age of 18, the highest paid entertainer in the Philippines. De la Cruz also appeared in films and received a FAMAS Best Supporting Actress Award in 1953.

== Early life ==
Catalina de la Cruz was born in Bustos, Bulacan. Even as a young child, de la Cruz would be hired to sing at town fiestas, and at intermissions during cockfights and boxing matches. Her formal schooling ended at the third grade.

In 1914, when she was seven years old, she was hired by the owner of a Manila film theater to sing to the audiences in between movie screenings. Such performances were typical in Manila theaters during that period, and from those routines would emerge a distinct genre eventually known as bodabil. She learned her songs through listening to phonograph records, and mastered the English language with the help of her brother.

== Bodabil star ==
By the age of thirteen, de la Cruz was a rising star in the bodabil circuit, performing alongside other leading stage performers such as Atang de la Rama. She soon became a solo headliner, performing in Manila's largest theaters such as the Savoy, the Palace, and the Lux. By 1925, de la Cruz was the highest paid entertainer in the Philippines. She fell in love, and later married, the piano player of her stage show. Some of the chorus girls who performed alongside her onstage, such as Chichay, Etang Discher, and Mary Walter, later become prominent entertainers in their own right.

De la Cruz was acknowledged as a proficient performer of torch songs who drew comparisons to Sophie Tucker and Carmen Miranda.

Initially, her signature tune was the bluesy ballad St. Louis Blues. After jazz became popular in the Philippines in the 1920s, de la Cruz adapted her singing style and soon mastered the art of scat singing, which became a trademark of hers. By the 1930s, de la Cruz would be most identified with the song Balut, a fast-paced jazzy tune written by Jerry Brandy. Her take on the song, which afforded her to showcase her scatting ability, has been described as impish and rustic, rounded out by her low, playfully dragging key. A slightly bawdy take, called "Balut", named for a notorious Filipino culinary delicacy of the same name, remains popular to date, with versions performed by the New Minstrels, Pilita Corrales, and Lani Misalucha.

She also occasionally acted in films, most prominently in Inspirasyon (1953), for which she received the FAMAS Best Supporting Actress Award in 1953. Many of her films were for Sampaguita Pictures.

== Later career ==
As bodabil slowly declined, de la Cruz concentrated on concert performances and international tours. In the late 1940s and early 1950s, she was a top-billed performer at the famed Forbidden City nightclub in San Francisco. In 1961, she starred in her own stage show in Las Vegas. De la Cruz also performed concert tours in Thailand, Taiwan, Hong Kong, Singapore, Australia, and Hawaii.

De la Cruz eventually retired to San Francisco, California, in the late 1960s, though she would occasionally perform until the late 1980s. In 1989, she visited the Philippines to attend the premiere at the Cultural Center of the Philippines of Katy!, a highly publicized stage musical based on her life. She stayed in the San Francisco Bay Area until her death in 2004.

== Family ==
Of de la Cruz's four children, her daughters Angie and Ronnie followed her into showbusiness, pairing with Nikki Ross to form Wing Trio, a singing group that was popular on the bodabil circuit and in films during the 1950s. When Ronnie got married, both Angie and Nikki continued on as the Wing Duo.

== In popular culture ==
- Katy! the Musical is a biographical musical based on the life of de la Cruz.
- Singer and actress Julie Anne San Jose portrayed de la Cruz on the GMA Network's war drama television series Pulang Araw.

== See also ==
- Katy! the Musical
- Pulang Araw
