= Arimunding-Munding =

1938 film

Arimunding-Munding is a film by Excelsior Pictures, starring José Padilla, Jr. and Carmen Rosales. It was made in 1938 and premiered in 1939.
