= MN (film) =

- Directed by: Mar S. Torres
- Screenplay by: Luciano B. Carlos
- Story by: Pablo S. Gomez; Pablo S. Gomez (as Carlos Gonda)
- Starring: Carmen Rosales; Alicia Vergel; Oscar Moreno; Cesar Ramirez
- Cinematography: Ruben Fallorina
- Edited by: Nario Rosales
- Music by: Ariston Avelino
- Color process: Black and white
- Production company: Sampaguita Pictures
- Distributed by: Sampaguita Pictures
- Release date: August 13, 1954
- Running time: 122 minutes
- Country: Philippines
- Languages: Filipino; Tagalog

MN is a 1954 Filipino movie produced by Sampaguita Pictures based on the comic book of the same name by Pablo S. Gomez. The film stars Sampaguita players including Carmen Rosales, Oscar Moreno, Alicia Vergel, Cesar Ramirez and Aruray.

== Cast ==
- Carmen Rosales as Marissa Navarro
- Alicia Vergel as Ada
- Oscar Moreno as Oscar
- Cesar Ramirez as Armando
- Aruray as Santa
- Panchito as Don Manolo Navarro (as Panchito Alba)
- Herminia Carranza as Sabel
- Apolonia Aguilar as Herself
- Leleng Isla as Herself
- Nenita Jana as Herself
- Bert LeRoy Jr. as Caloy (as Albert LeRoy)
- Marcela Garcia as Herself
- Clara Yumul as Herself
- Ismael Espinosa as Himself
- Nita Javier as Herself
- Amanda Perlas as Herself
