= Celeste Legaspi =

Filipino actress and singer (born 1950)

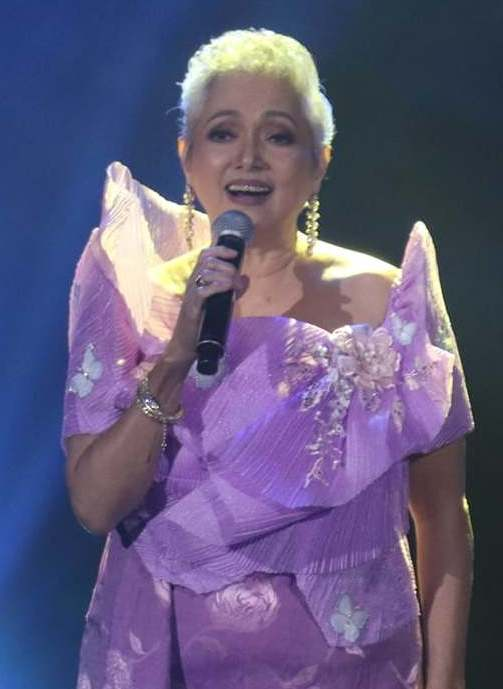
- Legaspi in December 2021 performing at the 90th anniversary of the Manila Metropolitan Theater
- Born: Celeste Kalugdan Legaspi; March 18, 1950 (age 76); Cavite City, Cavite, Philippines
- Other name: Michelle
- Education: Maryknoll College (BA)
- Occupations: Actress, singer
- Years active: 1955–present
- Spouse: Nonoy Gallardo (m. 1972)
- Children: 3
- Parent(s): Cesar Legaspi; Vitaliana Kalugdan

Celeste Kalugdan Legaspi-Gallardo (born March 18, 1950) is a Filipino singer, actress, film and theatre producer. She is an advocate for the rights of the artists. Her singles and albums reached gold or platinum status during the 1960s, 1970s and 1980s. She is the daughter of National Artist for Visual Arts César Legaspi. She has been one of the founders of the following artist organizations: Organisasyon ng Pilipinong Mang-aawit (OPM), Culturtain Musical Theater Productions, and Performers' Rights Society of the Philippines. She is married to Nonoy Gallardo, an advertising director and one of the premier Original Pilipino Music composers.

== Life and career ==
Legaspi (nicknamed Maricelle) is third of the five children of National Artist César Legaspi y Torrente of Tondo, Manila, and coloratura Vitaliana "Betty" Kalugdán y Guzmán of Cavite Viejo, Cavite. She started singing during her kindergarten years and by 1955, she started singing professionally with The Ambivalent Crowd, earning ₱25 per performance.

While in college at St. Paul, she played the lead role in One Legendary Evening and appeared in Show Boat as Magnolia followed by her performance as Nancy in the Philippine presentation of Oliver!. She later confessed that her performance in Show Boat scared her. "There I was, cracking every night, unable to be heard from the musical accompaniment, with Mama holding on to my sister Diana's hand. As a result I was disillusioned with my singing and with my course then--nursing," Legaspi told in an interview.

But the then 16-year-old Legaspi didn't give up her singing. Her singing career flourished upon shifting her course to Communication Arts at Maryknoll College (now Miriam College). She joined The Ambivalent Crowd, became a college graduate in 1971, and married Nonoy Gallardo in March 1972, with whom she has three children.

In 1972, she left The Ambivalent Crowd and joined the Up from Down Under Band as a soloist for a three-month stint at Wells Fargo. She then became part of the Time Machine which at the time had a singer named Didith Reyes and Anthony Castelo who would both conquer the OPM charts in the years ahead.

Legaspi's career rose further upon joining the ASEAN Tour in 1975 followed by a solo concert at the Cultural Center of the Philippines' (CCP) Little Theater where Rolando Tinio featured her in Filipino translations of popular songs at that time, most of the songs appeared in PopSongs Volume 1 (1976) album. The album featured Celeste's heartwarming Filipino renditions of Minnie Riperton's "Lovin' You", Diana Ross' "Do You Know Where You're Going To", and "The Lady Is a Tramp".

The impressive feat was followed by successful dinner-theater presentations in 1977 of Manila, Manila which won her an Aliw Award for Best Dinner Theater performance for that year. She also starred in Doon Po Sa Amin and Jesus Christ Superstar in 1978, each garnering Best Dinner Theater awards.

=== Theater arts ===
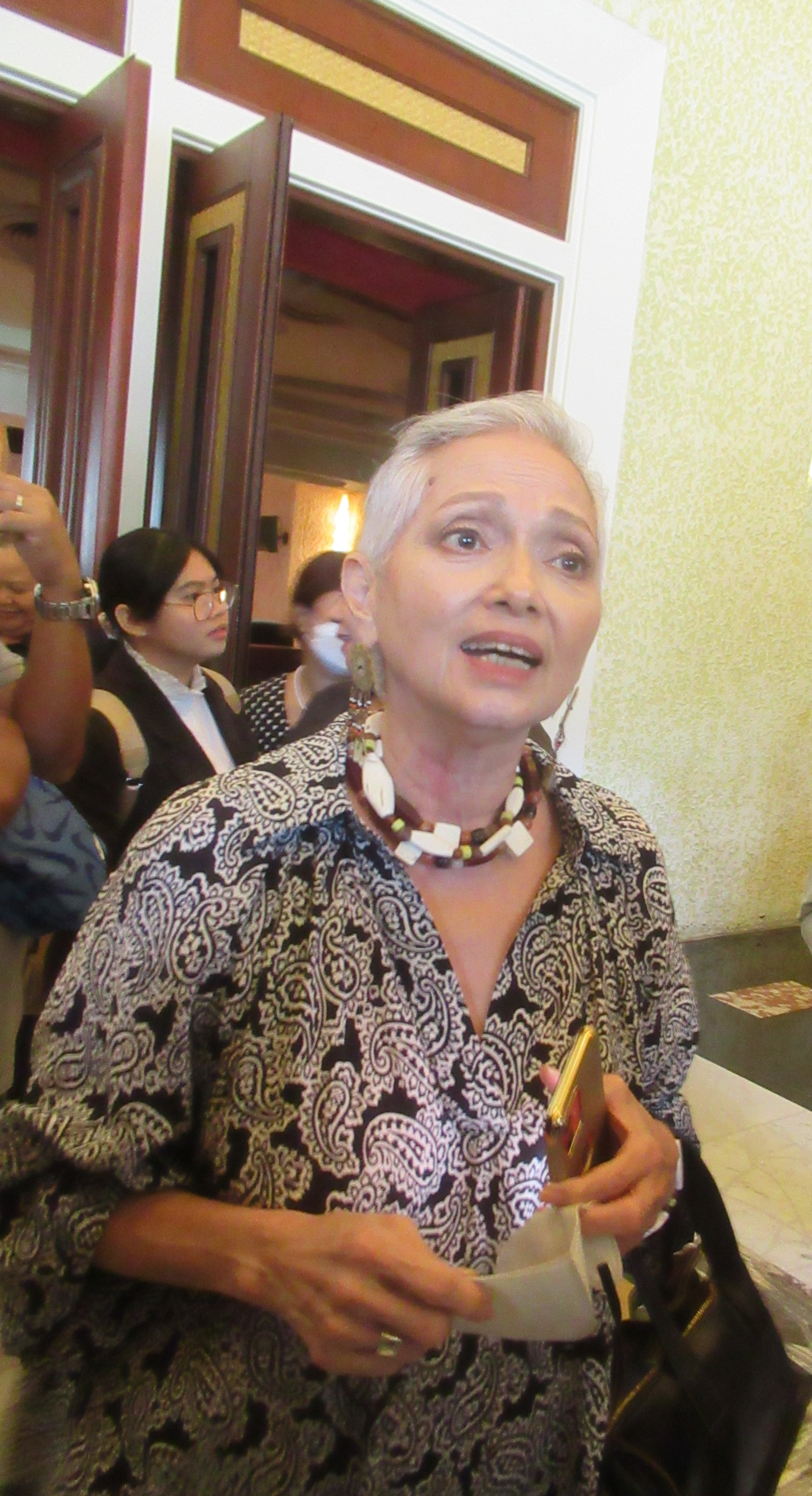
Legaspi at Manila Metropolitan Theater

After portraying the lead roles in the two college productions mentioned, Legaspi performed in the productions of the Philippine Educational Theater Association and the Cultural Center of the Philippines. She sang the part of the First Woman in the play "Tales of the Manuvu" (1977) produced by the CCP Dance Company, where she shared the stage with Hajji Alejandro. Her other stage works include an appearance in the hit musical Katy! (1988) for the Cultural Center of the Philippines' Tanghalang Pilipino, and the portrayals of Babae in North Diversion Road (1988), Caridad in the zarzuela Paglipas ng Dilim (1991), and Candida in Larawan (1992). Her most recent stage appearances include Si Dr. Dolly Dalisay at ang mga Ladybugs as the prostitute Leticia (2017), and in Ang Pag-uulyanin ni Olivia Mendoza as the trans woman Julia.

With talent manager Girlie Rodis, she was co-founder of Musical Theatre Philippines (Musicat), which produced seven musicals: Katy! (1988), Kenkoy Loves Rosing (1992), Alikabok (1995), Sino Ka Ba, Jose Rizal? (1996), Larawan, the Musical (1997), Fire Water Woman (1999), and Saranggola ni Pepe (2008)

Along with theater icon Zeneida Amador, she was awarded as the first recipient of the "Natatanging Gawad Buhay!" Award given by the Philippine Legitimate Stage Artists Group, Inc. (Philstage). The award embodies her lifetime contribution and marvelous efforts for the production of original Filipino musicals which flourished for over two decades since the 1980s. Legaspi, being the founding president of the Organisasyon ng Pilipinong Mang-aawit and Philstage, was key in establishing the Philippines' sole alliance of professional performing arts companies and organizations.

=== Film and television ===
Legaspi appeared in films such as Lino Brocka's Santiago (1970), Stardoom (1971) and Sa Kabila ng Lahat (1991), Mamang Sorbetero (1979), Tatlong Ina, Isang Anak (1987), Anak ng Pasig (1993) and Ishmael Bernal's Wating (1994). She also sang the main theme song of Kahit ang Mundo'y Magunaw (1975), a Manuel Cinco film starring Pilar Pilapil and Christopher de Leon. She was part of the cast of the 2017 film Ang Larawan.

Legaspi is also a television actress. One of her earliest TV exposures is when she was eight years old appearing in a Vicks commercial. In 1975-1976, she received the Sinag Awards from the Pambansang Akademya ng Telebisyon sa Agham at Sining (PATAS) for her performance in the TV special At Long Last Celeste, and for the TV weekly musical Iba't-ibang Celeste. In 1991, she also appeared in the RPN-9 drama series Cebu. In 2014, she portrayed as Maricel Soriano's protective and aristocratic mother in GMA-7's romantic drama series Ang Dalawang Mrs. Real. In 2023, Legaspi played the role of a Filipino-Chinese businesswoman and Rowell Santiago's aunt in the ABS-CBN romantic drama series Can't Buy Me Love.

=== Recording career ===
Legaspi is a successful recording artist, having produced albums and singles that reached gold and platinum status during the 1970s and 1980s. Her album Ako at si Celeste (1977) under Blackgold Records was awarded gold, and produced hit singles "Saranggola ni Pepe", "Tuliro", and "Gaano Ko Ikaw Kamahal?". The Celeste...Celeste (1979) album included "Mamang Sorbetero". Her albums Bagong Plaka, Lumang Kanta Vol. 1 and 2 albums under WEA Records, both reached the double platinum mark.

She won several awards including the Outstanding Performance award from the Song Festival in Tokyo, Japan, where she sang "Puso Mong Nagmamahal" (1976), Tinig Awards for live entertainment (1977, 1979, and 1990), and the Aliw Award for Entertainer of the Year (1978).

== Influences ==
Celeste Legaspi claims she is greatly influenced by Barbra Streisand, Liza Minnelli, Lena Horne, and Ella Fitzgerald. During one of her interviews she said that her type of music rests on elements of blues and those which intend to break the monotony of pop music.

== Discography ==
=== Singles ===
- "Ako'y Bakyang-bakya" / "Ang Buhay Ko'y Iyong-iyo" (1976)
- "Ang Puso Kong Nagmamahal" / "Hanggang Wakas"
- "Basta't Mahal Kita"
- "Bingwit ng Pag-ibig"
- "Binibiro Lamang Kita"
- "Dahil sa Iyo" (also covered by Julio Iglesias, Nat King Cole)
- "Fiesta"
- "Galawgaw"
- "Halina't Magsaya"
- "Ikaw Kasi"
- "Kalesa"
- "Lab Na Lab"
- "Larawan ng Buhay" / "Gaano Ko Ikaw Kamahal" (1977)
- "Mamang Sorbetero" / "Kubling Hardin" (1979)
- "Minsan ang Minahal Ay Ako" (1996, Theme from “Katy The Musical”)
- "Movie Fan"
- "Nasaan ang Palakpakan"
- "No Money, No Honey"
- "Only Selfless Love" (Theme of World Meeting Of Families PH 2003)
- "Pagdating Mo" (2nd Place Winner, MetroPop Song Festival 1978)
- "Saan Ka Man Naroroon" (also covered by Ric Manrique Jr.)
- "Sabado"
- "Sapagka't Mahal Kayo"
- "Sa Paskong Darating"
- "Saranggola ni Pepe" / "Lahat ng Gabi Bawa't Araw" (1977)
- "Sarung Banggi"
- "Tuliro"
- "Waray-Waray"

=== Albums ===
- Disco Dancing Moonlight (Pioneer Records, 1972)
- PopSongs Volume 1 (Pioneer Records, 1976)
- Ako at si Celeste (Vicor Music Corp., 1977)
- Celeste...Celeste (Universal Records, 1979)
- Bagong Plaka, Lumang Kanta (Universal Records, 1980)
- Bagong Plaka, Lumang Kanta Vol. 2 (Universal Records, 1982)
- This Is My Song (Universal Records, 1982)
- Koleksyon (Universal Records, 1984)
- Plakang Pamasko ni Celeste Legaspi (Universal Records, 1984)
- Si Celeste Naman Ngayon...Sapagkat Mahal Kayo: Tribute to Sylvia La Torre (Universal Records, 1986)
- The 30th Year (Universal Records, 1987)
- Bagong Plaka, Lumang Kanta Vol. 3 (Universal Records, 1990)
- Ang Larawan Musical Soundtrack, BMG, 1997

=== Compilations ===
- 40th Anniversary Celeste Legaspi Collection (2005)

=== Collaborations ===
- Pamasko ng Mga Bituin (Universal Records, 1981)
- Parangal Kay Constancio C. de Guzman (Universal Records, 1982)
- Salubungin ang Pasko (Universal Records, 1982)
- Maayong Pasko (Universal Records, 1989)
- Ginintuang Diwa ng Pasko (Universal Records, 1989)
- Ryan Cayabyab Silver Album (Sony BMG Music, 1996)
- Bongga! (The Biggest Retro OPM Hits) (Universal Records, 2008)
- Bongga 2 (The Biggest Retro OPM Hits) (Universal Records, 2009)
- Kick, Push by Lupe Fiasco features Celeste Legaspi's "Magtaksil Man Ikaw (Bolero Medley)" taken from her album Bagong Plaka, Lumang Kanta Vol. 2 (Universal, 1982) in Lupe Fiasco, Food & Liquor (Atlantic, 2006)

== Filmography ==
=== Television/digital ===
- Champoy
- Eat Bulaga!
- Cebu
- Concert at the Park
- Vilma!
- The Sharon Cuneta Show
- A Little Night of Music
- Ryan Ryan Musikahan
- Easy Dancing
- Keep on Dancing
- Shall We Dance: The Next Celebrity Challenge
- Talentadong Pinoy
- Glamorosa
- The Ryzza Mae Show
- Ang Dalawang Mrs. Real
- ASAP
- Maalaala Mo Kaya (2018 episode: "Portrait")
- Hello, Heart
- What We Could Be
- Can't Buy Me Love
- Rainbow Rumble
- Vibe PH OG

=== Movies ===
- Ang Larawan (2017)
- Wating (1994)
- Anak ng Pasig (1993)
- Sa Kabila ng Lahat (1991)
- Tatlong Ina, Isang Anak (1987)

== Concerts ==
- Concert at the Cultural Center of the Philippines Little Theater (November 8, 1975)
- Between Friends (with Maya 'Mitch' Valdez)(Light & Sound Theater Lounge, 1986)
- Celeste Komiks Konsyerto (Cultural Center of the Philippines, 1985)
- Celeste Sine! Sine! (Folk Arts Theater, 1986)
- Celeste Tunog PPO (Cultural Center of the Philippines Main Theater, 1987)
- Isang Daang Himig, Isang Daang Tinig: A Musical (with Ogie Alcasid, Janno Gibbs, Randy Santiago, Rachel Alejandro, etc.) (Folk Arts Theater, 2000)
- Celeste: A Tribute Concert (Solaire Grand Ballroom, 2017)

== Accolades ==
- SINAG Awards (PATAS): At Long Last Celeste (1975); Iba't-Ibang Celeste (1976)
- ALIW AWARDS: Best Dinner Theater Performance: Manila, Manila (1977); Doon Po sa Amin (1978); Jesus Christ Superstar (1978). Entertainer of the Year (1978).
- World Popular Song Festival (Tokyo, Japan): Outstanding Performance for Puso Mong Nagmamahal (1976)
- TINIG AWARDS for Live Entertainment (1977, 1979 and 1990)
- Metro Manila Popular Music Festival. Second Prize (Pagdating Mo, 1978); Finalist (Nasaan Ang Palakpakan, 1980) (as interpreter) (Music and Lyrics by Nonoy Gallardo)
- World Song Festival in Seoul (1981) Silver Award (Never Ever Say Goodbye) (Willy Cruz, composer)
- The Outstanding Women in the Nation's Service (TOWNS) Awards (1989)
- Natatanging Gawad Buhay! Award. Philstage Lifetime Achievement Award (2010)
- OPM ICON AWARD. Third Philippine Movie Press Club (PMPC) Star Awards for Music (2011)

| Year | Award giving body | Category | Nominated work | Results |
|---|---|---|---|---|
| 2000 | Awit Awards | Dangal / Parangal ng Musikong Pilipino Awards | —N/a | Won |
| 2011 | Eastwood City Walk Of Fame | Celebrity Inductee | —N/a | Won |
