= Pinky Marquez =

Filipino actress and singer

- Born: Pinky Marquez; Cebu, Philippines
- Education: University of the Philippines - Diliman (BS)
- Occupations: Actress, singer
- Years active: 1987 - present
- Spouse: Mari Cancio (m. 2004)
- Children: Karel Marquez

Pinky Marquez-Cancio is a singer and actress in theater, film and television.

== Personal life ==
Marquez was born and raised in Cebu, Philippines. Marquez was married to Mari Cancio on May 26, 2004. She is the mother of Karel Marquez, also an actress and singer, to her former husband, Dr. Eduardo Santos, a surgeon.

== Career ==
=== Theater ===
Musical theater has been Pinky’s life since the late 1980s. For her, the perks of touring a musical stage play are being able to travel and meet new people. She was part of the production, titled “Marco Polo: When You Find Your True Love,” which toured Berlin, Germany, and Brussels, Belgium, in 2018. Marquez is also a musical theater teacher, at a mobile school called Playbill Theater Arts Academy.

=== Music ===
Marquez is active in music and performs in musical theater, concerts and shows. In the early 80s, Marquez joined a musical show band, Music Making Company. Marquez is one of the original members of Organisasyong Pilipinong Mangaawit (OPM) collectively known as OPM Friends, an all-star line up of veteran Filipino singers and performers.

=== Film and Television ===
In 2009, Marquez was cast as Doña Catalina Pulido in Zorro. Marquez also appeared in some episodes of drama-anthology Maalaala Mo Kaya and Magpakailanman, Spirits Reawaken (2018), and The Half Sisters.

In 2025, Marquez became the first Rainbow Rumble master of the newest season of "Rainbow Rumble" as she bagged a total of P1,071,000 after completing the six unique colors in "Rainbow Reveal".

== Filmography ==
=== Film ===
Year	Title	Role	Notes
1988	Code Name: Black and White	Pinky	
1988	Gorio Punasan, Rebel Driver	Rosa	
1989	Everlasting Love		
1989	The Singing Master		
2003	Ngayong Nandito Ka	Donya Leony Rodriguez	
2004	Otso-Otso: Pamela-Mela Wan	Mrs. Ronquillo	
2004	Bridal Shower	Emily	
2005	Hari ng Sablay: Isang Tama, Sampung Mali	Manang	
2008	One True Love	Margarita Mijares	
2008	Loving You	Cyrill's mom	
2009	Wat Floor Ma'am?		Short Film
2012	Of All the Things	Mother of Umboy	
2012	A Secret Affair	Aunt of Rafi	
2018	Spirits: Reawaken	Lola Azon	

=== Television ===
Year	Title	Role	Notes
2000	Wansapanataym		Episode: Bata-Okey
2002	Maalaala Mo Kaya		Episode: Sapatos
2002	Wansapanataym		Episode: Daddy's Girl
2003	Magpakailanman	Pilita Corrales	Episode: Nang Tumawa ang Kapalaran: The Bert "Tawa" Marcelo Story
2003	Wansapanataym		Episode: Ok Ka Fairy Tay
2004	Wansapanataym		Episode: Askal at Pusakal
2004	Magpakailanman		Episode: Dahil Muling Aawit Ang Tagumpay: The Dice & K9 Story
2004	Love to Love	Aling Diana	Episode: Duet for Love
2004-2005	Forever in My Heart	Ella Bernabe	
2005	Magpakailanman		Episode: Tinig ng Buhay:The Faith Cuneta Story
2007	Magpakailanman		Episode: Dugo ng Buhay: The Rosa Rosal Story
2008	Maalaala Mo Kaya	Flor's Mother	Episode: Bus
2009	Zorro	Catalina Pulido	
2009-2010	Ikaw Sana	Sylvia Arellano	
2010	Love Bug	Anita	Episode: The Last Romance
2010	Pilyang Kerubin	Theresa	
2012	Maalaala Mo Kaya	Jane	Episode: Stuffed Toy
2013	Wansapanataym	Grandmother	Episode: Doggy, Daddy, Doggy!
2013	Maalaala Mo Kaya	Loring	Episode: Puntod
2014	The Legal Wife	Emma Alvaro	
2014-2016	The Half Sisters	Cleo Castillo	
2015	Maalaala Mo Kaya	Belen	Episode: Bracelet
2015-2016	Pangako sa 'Yo	Puring Bejerrano	
2017	Maalaala Mo Kaya	Old Thelma	Episode: Autograph
2017	Maalaala Mo Kaya	Genoviva	Episode: Bahay
2018	Sana Dalawa ang Puso	Joana Chavez	
2019	Ang Probinsyano	Rosario Romero	
2019-2020	Pepito Manaloto: Tuloy ang Kuwento	Lilian	

=== Variety and reality show ===
Year	Title	Role	Notes
1987-2008	Kalatog Pinggan	Herself	
2006	All Star K!	Herself	
2008	Celebrity Duets: Philippine Edition	Herself	
2022-2025	Family Feud	Herself	Various Episodes
2024	Fast Talk with Boy Abunda	Herself	
2025	Rainbow Rumble	Herself	
2026	Eat Bulaga!	Herself	Various Episodes

== Theatre ==
Year	Production	Role	Venue	Ref.
1988	Katy! the Musical	Hanna	Rizal Theater, Makati	
1990	The Diary of Anne Frank	Mrs. Van Daan	Phil-Am Life Auditorium, Manila	
1996	Magnificat	Virgin Mary	Various venue, originally in Pinky's living room	
1999	Rama at Sita	Kaikeyi	UP Diliman Theater	
2001	The Vagina Monologues	Various roles		
2002	Oedipus Rex		Wilfrido Ma. Guerrero Theater	
2002	A Portrait of the Artist as Filipino	Elsa Montes	CCP Little Theater, Pasay	
2005	Beauty and the Beast	Mrs. Potts	Meralco Theater, Pasig	
2006	Glorious	Dorothy		
2007	Fiddler on the Roof	Golde	Onstage, Greenbelt One, Makati	
2008	A Christmas Carol	Various roles	Onstage, Greenbelt One, Makati	
2008	Romance in D	Helen Norton	Onstage, Greenbelt One, Makati	
2008	Cory, the Musical	Imelda Marcos	Meralco Theater, Pasig	
2009	Cory, the Musical — restaging	Imelda Marcos	Meralco Theater, Pasig	
2009	Songs for a New World	Mrs. Claus	Carlos P. Romulo Theater, RCBC Plaza	
2010	Little Women	Marmee	Onstage, Greenbelt One, Makati	
2010	The Wedding Singer	Rosie	Meralco Theater, Pasig	
2011	Seussical	Sour Kangaroo/ Mrs. Mayor	Onstage, Greenbelt One, Makati	
2011	Peter Pan – A Musical Adventure	Mrs. Mary Darling	Meralco Theater, Pasig	
2011	Cory, the Musical — restaging	Imelda Marcos	Meralco Theater, Pasig	
2011	The Sound of Music	Mother Abbess	Newport Performing Arts Theater	
2012	The Wizard of Oz	Wicked Witch of the West	Onstage, Greenbelt One, Makati	
2013	No Way to Treat a Lady	Alexandra Gill / Carmella	Onstage, Greenbelt One, Makati	
2013	The Graduate	Mrs. Robinson	Onstage, Greenbelt One, Makati	
2013	Cinderella	Stepmother/ Fairy Godmother	Newport Performing Arts Theater	
2014	Rivalry: Ateneo-La Salle the Musical	Andrea Valencia	CCP Little Theater	
2014	Priscilla, Queen of the Desert	Shirley	Newport Performing Arts Theater	
2015	Marco Polo: The Untold Love Story	Empress Wu	CCP, Tanghalang Nicanor Abelardo	
2017	Newsies	Medda Larkin	The Theatre at Solaire / Globe Live	
2019	Magnificat	Virgin Mary	Music Museum, San Juan	
2021	Lapu-Lapu	Beatriz	Online Independence Day Show	
2023	Snow White and the Prince	Evil Queen	Onstage, Greenbelt One, Makati	
2024-2025	Jepoy and the Magic Circle	Doña Geronima / Doña Etang	REP Eastwood Theater, Quezon City	
2025	Alice in Wonderland	Queen of Hearts	REP Eastwood Theater, Quezon City	
2026	Cinderella: The Tale of the Glass Slipper	Stepmother	REP Eastwood Theater, Quezon City	
2026	On Your Feet	Consuelo Garcia	Proscenium Theater, Rockwell Center	
