= Imelda Concepcion =

- Born: 1936
- Occupation: Actress

Imelda Concepcion (born 1936) was an actress associated with Sampaguita Pictures. She appeared primarily in supporting roles.

Concepcion was first noticed as a friend of Rita Gomez in a Pancho Magalona-Linda Estrella movie called Milyonarya at Hampaslupa (The Millionaire and the Pauper).

She served as one of the female leads in Fred Montilla and Tessie Agana swashbuckler movie, Nagkita si Kerubin at Si Tulisang Pugot (Kerubin Meets the Headless Bandit).

== Filmography ==
- 1954 - Milyonarya at Hampaslupa
- 1954 - Nagkita si Kerubin at si Tulisang Pugot
- 1954 - Menor de Edad
- 1955 - R.O.T.C.
- 1955 - Iyung-Iyo
- 1956 - Prince Charming
