= Code Name: Black and White =

- Directed by: Gayjee Pangan
- Screenplay by: Ross Oracion; Gayjee Pangan; Carlos Diaz
- Story by: Gayjee Pangan
- Starring: Chiquito; Redford White; Pinky Marquez; Beverly Vergel; Bubbles Lin; Nieves Manuel; Roy Alvarez; Paquito Diaz; Rocco Montalban; Renato del Prado
- Cinematography: Amado de Guzman
- Edited by: Nap Montebon
- Music by: Geyju Jr.
- Production company: ABA Films
- Release date: December 15, 1988
- Country: Philippines
- Language: Filipino

Code Name: Black and White is a 1988 Filipino action comedy film written and directed by Gayjee Pangan and starring Chiquito, Redford White, Pinky Marquez, Beverly Vergel, Bubbles Lin, Tintoy, Paquito Diaz, Roy Alvarez, Renato del Prado and Nieves Manuel. Produced by ABA Productions, the film was released on December 15, 1988.

== Plot ==
Blacky and White is the Brothers Criminal Police syndicate of Sonny Boy

== Cast ==
- Chiquito as Blacky
- Redford White as Whitey
- Pinky Marquez as Pinky
- Beverly Vergel as Beverly
- Tintoy
- Paquito Diaz as Panero
- Roy Alvarez as Sonny Boy
- Renato del Prado
- Nieves Manuel as Nieves
- Angelo Ventura as Chief. Madrigal
- Philip Henson
- Cez Quijanco
- Tony Manalili
- Bubbles Lin as Bubbles
- Rocco Montalban
- Vilma Fernandez
- Tony Bagyo
- Maning Bato

== Release ==
Code Name: Black and White was given a "P" rating by the Movie and Television Review and Classification Board (MTRCB), which stands for "Parental Guidance Recommended," and was released on December 15, 1988.
