= César Ramírez (actor) =

Filipino actor

- Born: Arlen Quindoy Aguilar; July 9, 1925; Philippine Islands
- Died: July 18, 2003 (aged 78); Quezon City, Philippines
- Resting place: Loyola Memorial Park
- Occupation: Actor
- Years active: 1949–1975
- Spouse: Alicia Vergel (m. 1953; died 1992)
- Children: Ace Vergel; Beverly Vergel

César Ramírez (born Arlen Quindoy Aguilar; July 9, 1925 – July 18, 2003), was a Filipino actor who was a leading man for Sampaguita Pictures. He was famous for his portrayal of a Philippines' mythical hero, "Bernardo Carpio".

He was married to Alicia Vergel. They had two children, Ace and Beverly. Sometime after retiring from the film business, in 1975, Ramirez moved to San Francisco, California in the United States.

He died of cardiac arrest on July 18, 2003.

== Filmography ==
- Huling Patak ng Dugo (1950)
- Tenyente Ramirez (1950)
- Campo O' Donnell (1950)
- 13 Hakbang (1950)
- Bernardo Carpio (1951)
- Tres Muskiteros (1951)
- Madam X (1952)
- Palasig (1952)
- El Indio (1953)
- Diwani (1953)
- Reyna Bandida (1953)
- Ukkala (1954)
- MN (1954)
- Tres Ojos (1954)
- Dumagit (1954)
- R.O.T.C. (1954)
- Artista (1955))
- Kuripot (1955)
- Uhaw sa Pag-ibig (1955)
- Lupang Kayumangi (1955)
- Walang Panginoon (1956)
- Haring Espada (1956)
- Montalan Brothers (1956)
- Kahariang Bato (1957)
- Bicol Express (1957)
- Aliping Maharlika (1957)
- Matira ang Matibay (1958)
- Ramir (1958)
- Sisang Tabak (1958)
- Sa Pagitan Ng Dalawang Mata (1963)
- 7 Cobra (1964)
