= Carmen Rosales =

Filipino actress (1917–1991)

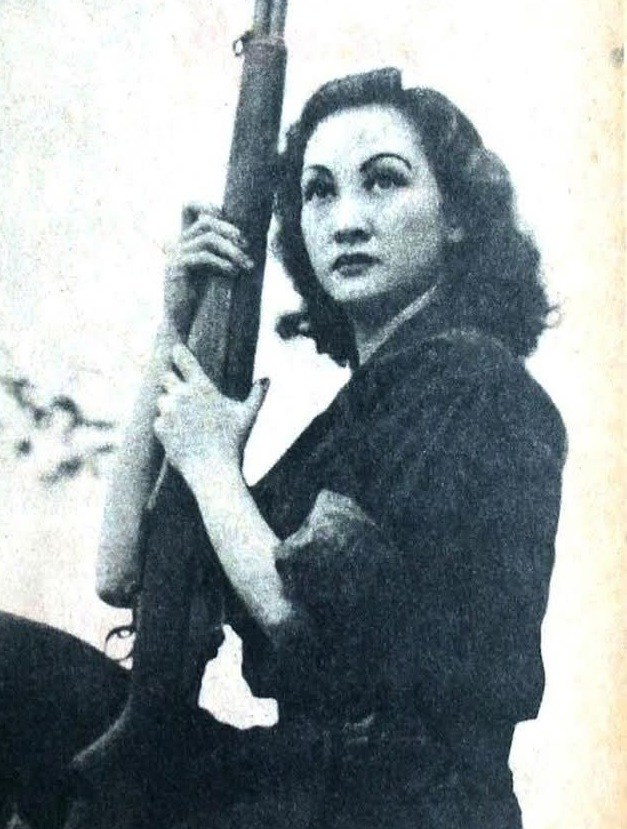
- Rosales in 1946
- Born: Januaria Constantino Keller; March 3, 1917; Rosales, Pangasinan, Insular Government of the Philippine Islands, United States
- Died: December 11, 1991 (aged 74); Mandaluyong, Metro Manila, Philippines
- Resting place: Loyola Memorial Park - Marikina, Philippines
- Occupations: Actress; singer
- Years active: 1938–1965
- Spouses: Ramon Navales (m. 1935; died 1943) Jose Puyat Jr. (m. 1947; died 1948)

Carmen Rosales (born Januaria Constantino Keller; March 3, 1917 – December 11, 1991) was a Filipino actress whose career spanned nearly three decades. Known for her roles in romantic musicals, she was the highest paid movie star and one of the major box-office draws during the pre-war and post-war period.

Born in Rosales, Pangasinan, she began her career after winning Miss Radio in 1936 and expanded into acting through Mahiwagang Binibini (1939), her feature film debut. Rosales auditioned for film roles at LVN Pictures but was dismissed. A smaller film outfit took her in and produced her second film Arimunding-Munding (1939). Later that year, Sampaguita Pictures signed her and rose to prominence opposite Rogelio de la Rosa in Takipsilim, and Señorita the following year—two of twelve films they both starred in.

Rosales' film career was interrupted following the Japanese occupation of the Philippines. Ramon Navales, her first husband, was killed by the Japanese forces which led her to join the guerrilla movement as a sharpshooter. Her career peaked during the post-war era, with starring roles in blockbuster films such as Guerilyera, Probinsyana (both in 1946), Kampanang Ginto (1949), Inspirasyon (1953) for which she won a FAMAS Award for Best Actress, Ang Tangi kong Pag-ibig (1955), and Maalaala Mo Kaya (1956). Rosales continued appearing in films until her retirement in 1965 and maintained a reclusive lifestyle for most part of her life until her death in 1991.

== Early life ==
Carmen Rosales was born as Januaria Constantino Keller on March 3, 1917, in Rosales, Pangasinan, to Pilar Constantino y de la Cruz and Pantaleon Keller, who was of Swedish descent. The youngest of four children, she was raised in Plaridel, Bulacan and showed an early interest in performing by singing for her mother's jewelry clients. Rosales graduated from the Maffei Fashion School with a major in Decorative Arts and Dressmaking in 1934. While working as a dressmaker and instructor, she was approached by radio scriptwriter Lina Flor, who encouraged her to pursue a career in acting.

== Film career ==
=== Breakthrough, 1936–1941 ===
Having previously worked as a dressmaker, Rosales began her career as a singer and competed in popular radio shows where she won Miss Radio in 1936. She branched into acting onscreen and appeared in her first feature film Mahiwagang Binibini (1939), where she also played double to Atang de la Rama. Seeking to advance her career, she applied for a film part at LVN Pictures but was rejected by studio executives who claimed she had "no profile". A smaller film outfit, Excelsior Films, subsequently took her in and starred in her first leading role opposite Jose Padilla Jr. in the musical drama Arimunding-Munding (1939). Later in 1939, she signed a contract with Sampaguita Pictures and rose to prominence when she was paired with Rogelio de la Rosa in Takipsilim (1939), her first feature film under the film outfit.

Following the success of their first teamup in Takipsilim, she starred opposite de la Rosa in four feature films the following year. Senorita, which according to The Philippine Star writer Ricky Lo, launched their loveteam into stardom and became "the biggest pre-war box office hit". In 1941, she reunited with Jose Padilla Jr. and starred in their second film together, Carmen. It was the first film to premiere at the Dalisay Theatre. She next starred in two films; one was in Gerardo de Leon's Panambitan opposite de la Rosa and later that year with Padilla Jr. in Lolita. Directed by American filmmaker Bert Covit, the film was one of the last major films shown in Manila before the city was occupied by Japanese military.

=== Postwar stardom, 1946–1965 ===
Following the conclusion of World War II, Rosales resumed her acting career in 1946 with Guerilyera, a film produced by Sampaguita Pictures, inspired by her real-life service as a sharpshooter during the Japanese occupation. Later that year, she began working as a freelancer and starred in Premiere Productions' inaugural film, Probinsyana, which was a commercial success and reunited her with Jose Padilla Jr. During this period, she maintained a prolific schedule with major studio releases.

Following a long conflict with Rogelio de la Rosa, during which she refused to speak or worked with him, due to disputes over salary and status, LVN Pictures offered Rosales ₱45,000 in 1949 to reunite with de la Rosa in Kampanang Ginto, a deal that made her the highest paid movie star of the period. The same year, she starred opposite Fernando Poe Sr. in Carmencita Mia, where she played the title role. Choreographed by Don Jose Zarah, the film simulated a Mexican setting, featuring the lead actors in traditional Mexican costumes performing regional songs. The following year, she starred opposite Danilo Montes in Ang Magpapawid. The film, which was produced by Royal Productions owned by Fernando Poe Sr., was a commercial success and reportedly "bailed the tottering studio out of its financial crisis."

In 1951, Rosales was paired with Robert Neil in the romantic musical Babae, Babae at Babae Pa!. Directed by Lorenzo P. Tuells, the film was also distributed in the United States by Picture Associates of Hollywood, California with the title Nothing But Women, an English-language version of the film. In 1953, she starred in the romantic drama film Inspirasyon. For her performance, she was awarded the FAMAS Award for Best Actress. The following year, Rosales was paired with Rogelio de la Rosa again in what appeared to be their most successful film together, Maalaala Mo Kaya.

In 1956, she starred opposite frequent onscreen partner de la Rosa in their final film together, Lydia. The same year, she took a two-year leave of absence to travel to the United States, reportedly due to personal relationship strains with Carding Cruz. Her extended absence led Sampaguita Pictures to reassign several roles intended for her—including Sino ang Maysala?, Veronica, and Sonata—to Paraluman. She returned to acting in 1959 through the romantic drama Sandra, her third and final film with Leopoldo Salcedo.

In 1961, Rosales was cast as Hanna Quintos, an ageing movie star in Octavia starring Lolita Rodriguez in the title role.

== World War II ==
=== Guerilla fighter, 1942–1945 ===
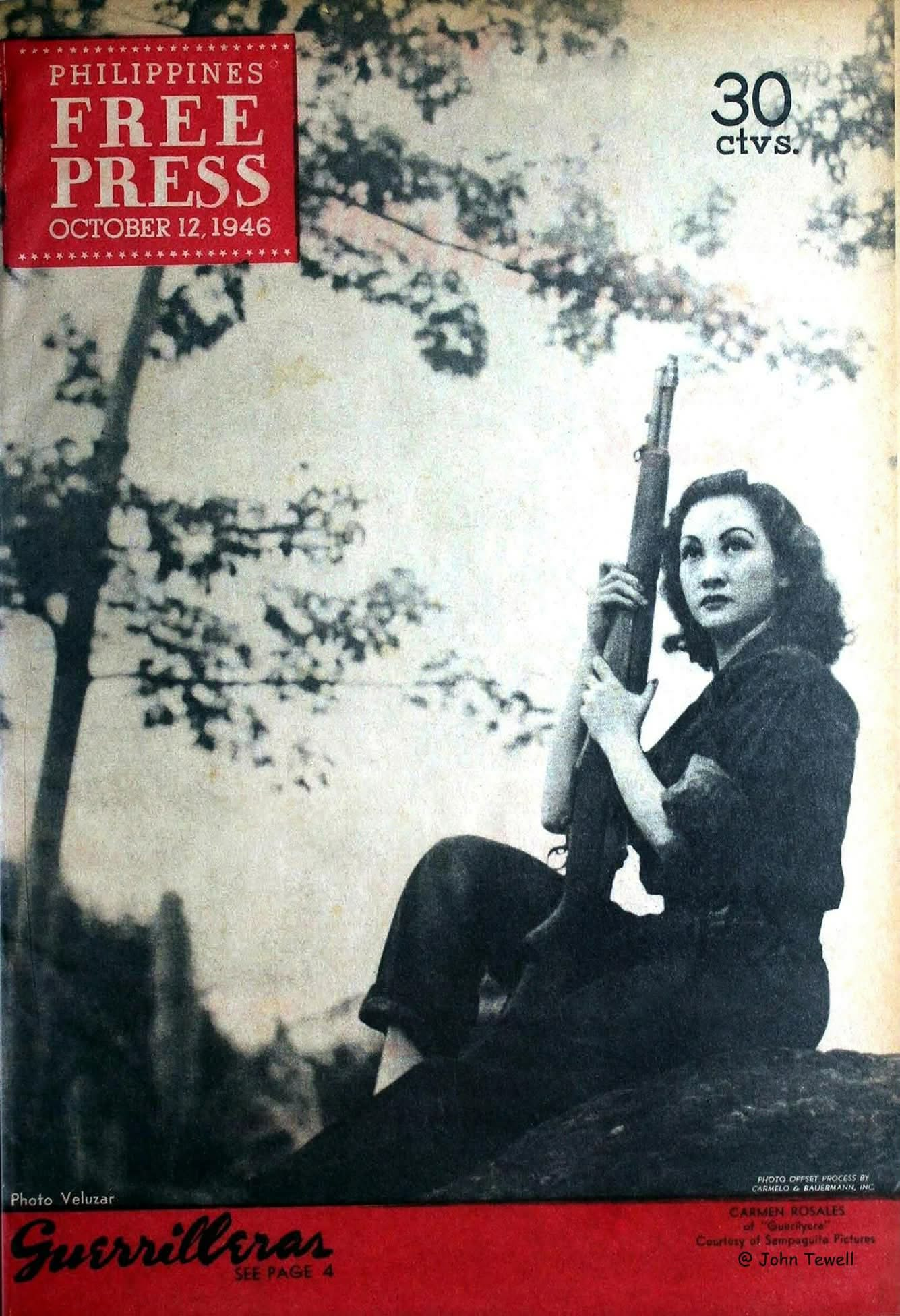
Rosales on the cover of Philippines Free Press (1946)

During the Japanese occupation of the Philippines, the film industry was disrupted and completely halted production. Following the death of her first husband, Ramon Navales, who was killed by the Japanese forces, she joined the Hukbong Bayan Laban sa Hapon (Hukbalahap) guerrilla movement. Operating primarily in Calabarzon region and Laguna, she disguised herself with a false mustache during raids and was reportedly involved in the killing of a Makapili in Santa Rosa.

Rosales retreated to Silang, Cavite to escape capture, but her location was ultimately compromised. She was reportedly pressured to star in the film and accepted the role only after being threatened that her refusal would lead to a massacre of civilians in her home province. In 1944, the Japanese authorities sponsored the production of Gerardo de Leon's Tatlong Maria, which was based on Jose Esperanza Cruz' novel of the same name and was adapted to screen by Tsutomu Sawamura.

== Personal life and death ==
Rosales worked at the radio station KZRH before becoming an actress. There she met her first husband, Ramon Navales, with whom she had a son, Reynaldo "Rene" Navales. During this period, her son recalled that she "would come home tired she could barely manage to ask for a glass of water", years preceding her film debut. Navales was executed by Japanese military during the Japanese occupation of the Philippines, an event that prompted her to join the guerrilla movement. On March 27, 1947, she remarried to Jose "Peping" Puyat Jr., a businessman from the prominent Puyat family. They had one child together, Cesar Puyat. The marriage ended with the death of Puyat Jr. in 1948.

Following her final film appearance in 1965, Rosales retired from the film industry and maintained a reclusive lifestyle. She avoided public appearances, photographs, and refused interviews for both print and television, cultivating a sense of mystique that kept the public speculating about her well-being and appearance for nearly twenty-five years. She was intentional about preserving her image as "a glamorous movie queen," ensuring that the public’s last visual memory of her remained unchanged from her prime. This commitment to privacy was most evident during the 1983 FAMAS Awards, where she agreed to participate in a filmed segment only on the condition that she be shown exclusively in silhouette. Her final public television appearance occurred in 1987 on the program Eye to Eye, hosted by Inday Badiday. Rosales died on December 11, 1991. Her wake was held in Loyola Memorial Park's Guadalupe Chapel.

== Legacy and honors ==
Carmen was bigger than life, a star of the magnitude of Hollywood greats Greta Garbo, Bette Davis and Katharine Hepburn.

— Marichu Maceda, The Philippine Star (2005)

Often referred to by film journalists as the "original Superstar", Rosales was one of the leading movie stars of the pre-war and post-war eras in the Philippines. She was voted the most popular female star of 1941 in a popularity contest by Ramon Arces, Inc. and was named Movie Queen in 1948 and 1949 after placing first in a popularity voting poll by an entertainment magazine. In 1949, LVN Pictures reportedly paid her ₱45,000 to star in Kampanang Ginto, becoming the highest-paid movie star of the period. In the 21st century, she is best known to general audiences for her association with Rogelio de la Rosa, whom she starred with in twelve films. The Philippine Entertainment Portal have named them the most popular loveteam of the 1940s and 1950s. Writing for Manila Standard, Leo Sergio agreed that Rosales and de la Rosa "served as the precursor of the ideal loveteam."

For her wartime service, a barrio in Rosales, Pangasinan was named after her, divided into two barangays, Carmen East and Carmen West. On March 12, 2000, Jolina Magdangal performed and dressed up as Rosales in the musical comedy program Star Studio. In 2005, Danny Dolor of Tribung Pilipino Foundation and the National Commission for Culture and the Arts organized a tribute program to Rosales' film career. In 2006, she was one of the first Filipino to be inducted into the Eastwood City Walk of Fame. In 2007, the Movie Workers Welfare Foundation awarded her with an Ani Award alongside eight other recipients for her contributions to Philippine film industry.

=== Accolades ===
Awards and nominations received by Carmen Rosales
Award	Year	Recipient	Category	Result	Ref.
Doña Josefa Edralin-Marcos Foundation and At Iba Pa (Note: At Iba Pa is a group of film personalities which include Boots Anson-Roa, Mel Chionglo, Mike de Leon, Simon Ongpin, Bibsy Carballo, Ishmael Bernal, Ronald Constantino and Laurice Guillen.)	1982	Carmen Rosales	Walang Kupas Award	Honored	
Eastwood City Walk of Fame	2006	Carmen Rosales	Inductee	Honored	
FAMAS Awards	1954	Inspirasyon	Best Actress	Won	
FAMAS Awards	1963	Mama's Boy	Best Actress	Nominated	
Luna Awards	1989	Carmen Rosales	Special Recognition Award	Honored	
Manila Film Festival	1967	Carmen Rosales	Gantimpalang Gatpuno	Honored	
Manila Film Festival	1972	Carmen Rosales	Special Award	Honored	
Metro Manila Film Festival	1991	Carmen Rosales	Posthumous Award	Honored	
Mowelfund	2007	Carmen Rosales	Ani Award	Honored	

== Filmography ==
Carmen Rosales's film credits with year of release, film titles and roles
Year	Title	Role	Notes	Ref(s)
1939	Mahiwagang Binibini: Ang Kiri			
1939	Arimunding-Munding			
1939	Takipsilim			
1940	Lambingan			
1940	Señorita			
1940	Diwa ng Awit			
1940	Colegiala			
1941	Carmen			
1941	Princesita			
1941	Tampuhan			
1941	Panambitan			
1941	Palikero			
1941	Lolita			
1944	Tatlong Maria	Maria Fe		
1946	Garrison 13			
1946	Probinsyana			
1946	Guerilyera			
1947	Kaaway ng Bayan			
1947	Mameng, Iniibig Kita			
1947	Hele Hele Bago Quiere			
1947	Ang Kamay ng Diyos			
1947	Si, Si, Señorito			
1948	Carmencita Mia	Carmencita		
1948	Ang Selosa			
1948	24 na Pag-ibig			
1948	Hindi Kita Malimot			
1949	Kampanang Ginto			
1949	Simpatika			
1949	Camelia			
1949	Sipag ay Yaman			
1949	Batalyon XIII			
1950	Ang Bombero: Kaaway ng Apoy			
1950	Ang Magpapawid			
1951	Anak Ko...!			
1951	Nothing but Women			
1951	Huling Konsiyerto			
1951	Walang Kapantay			
1951	Nanay Ko			
1951	Babae, Babae, at Babae Pa			
1953	May Umaga pang Darating			
1953	Rosa Villa			
1953	Inspirasyon			
1954	Maalaala Mo Kaya?	Pilar		
1954	Matandang Dalaga			
1954	MN	Marissa Navarro		
1954	Luha ng Birhen			
1955	Ang Tangi kong Pag-ibig			
1955	Uhaw na Pag-ibig			
1955	R.O.T.C.	Conchita		
1955	Iyung-iyo			
1956	Lydia	Lydia		
1959	Sandra	Sandra Belmonte		
1959	Pitong Pagsisisi			
1959	Debutante			
1959	Baby Face			
1959	Vicky			
1959	Esmeralda			
1960	Estela Mondragon	Estela Mondragon		
1960	Kaming Makasalanan			
1960	Tatlong Magdalena			
1960	Limang Misteryo ng Krus			
1961	Mother Dearest		Segment: "The Sinner"	
1961	Octavia	Hanna Quintos		
1961	Halik sa Lupa			
1961	Dayukdok			
1962	The Big Broadcast			
1962	Sugat sa Balikat			
1962	Mama's Boy			
1963	Sosayting Dukha			
1963	The Big Show			
1964	Binibiro Lamang Kita			
1964	Anak ni Kamagong			
1964	The Dolly Sisters			
1964	Show of Shows			
1965	Apat na Kagandahan			
1965	Gintong Recuerdo			

== See also ==
- List of Filipino actresses
- Cinema of the Philippines
- Golden Age of Philippine cinema
- FAMAS Award for Best Actress

== Sources ==
- Sebastiampillai, Chrishandra (2024). Stardom, Film Couples and Love Teams in 1970s Philippine Cinema. Edinburgh University Press. ISBN 9781399521017.
- Doyo, Ma. Ceres P. (1993). Journalist in Her Country: Articles, Essays & Photographs, 1980-1992. Anvil Publishing. ISBN 9789712703201.
- Atienza, Glecy; Galvez, Joy (1994). CCP Encyclopedia of Philippine Art, Volume III: Philippine film. Cultural Center of the Philippines. ISBN 9789718546420.
- Hanan, David (2001). Film in South East Asia: Views from the Region. SEAPAVAA. ISBN 9780642705129.
- Villacorte, Rolando (1985). Baliwag, then and now. Pilipino Star Printing Co. Fil 959.913221 V712b.
- Mercado, Monica Allerey (1977). Doña Sisang and Filipino Movies. A.R. Mercado Management, Incorporated. OCLC 5516952.
