= Nelly Baylon =

Bienvenida Anong, better known for her screen name Nelly Baylon, was a Filipina film actress. She was discovered by the owner of Sampaguita Pictures while she was selling sampaguita flowers on the streets of Manila.

== Early life ==
She was born in 1937 under the name and was raised by her mother, Justa Santiago vda. de Anong, along with her older siblings Eugenio Anong and Dolores Mapugay. She immediately took the film Chavacano with Dolphy in 1956. She also did a supporting role for the movie Hahabul-Habol, starring Gloria Romero and Ric Rodrigo. She was also associated with Susan Roces' films "Prinsesang Gusgusin" and "Mga Reyna ng Vicks". Baylon was on her way to her first starring role shooting when a car accident, somewhere in Laguna, took her life. Susan Roces replaced her for the role and eventually became a box-office star and Queen of Philippine Movies. Roces was among the first who showed up in her wake.

== Films ==
- 1955 - Binibining kalog
- 1956 - Chavacano
- 1956 - Boksingera
- 1957 - Hahabul-Habol
- 1957 - Ismol but Teribol
- 1957 - Mga Ligaw na Bulaklak
- 1957 - Prinsesang Gusgusin
- 1958 - Mga Reyna ng Vicks
