= Ace Vergel =

Filipino actor

- Vergel in Sige Subukan Mo (1998)
- Born: Ace York Caesar Asturias Aguilar; November 20, 1954
- Died: December 15, 2007 (aged 53); Santa Cruz, Manila, Philippines
- Resting place: Garden Of The Divine Word, Christ the King Mission Seminary, Quezon City
- Other names: Alas, The Original Bad Boy of Philippine Movies
- Occupation: Actor
- Years active: 1957–2007
- Spouse: Maya Dela Cuesta
- Children: Alejandro King Aguilar
- Parent(s): Alicia Vergel and César Ramírez
- Awards: Gawad Urian Best Actor 1988 Anak ng Cabron; PMPC Star Award for Movie Actor of the Year 1989 Anak ng Cabron

Ace York Caesar Asturias Aguilar (November 20, 1954 – December 15, 2007), better known by his stage name Ace Vergel, was a Filipino actor dubbed "The Original Bad Boy of Philippine Movies". He was the son of the late film actors Alicia Vergel and César Ramírez, and brother of actress Beverly Vergel.

== Early life ==
He was born Ace York Caesar Asturias Aguilar in the Philippines on November 20, 1954, to parents Alicia Vergel and Cesar Ramirez. His parents were well-known stars in the 1950s.

He attended Business Management and Public Relations at Ateneo de Manila University in 1975.

He was married to Maya dela Cuesta and had a son named Alejandro King dela Cuesta Aguilar.

== Film career ==
Ace Vergel, being a "Child of Cinema" started in the film industry at the age of 3. His screen debut was in "Taong Putik" which starred his mother. He appeared in his first full-length movie at the age of five using his real name Ace York, where he played the friend of a giant bird in the 1959 film Anak ng Bulkan. The movie starred Fernando Poe Jr. and Edna Luna. At the age of 7, Ace dropped out of the movie scene as he reached school age.

In 1969 At the age of 15 he made a movie comeback and was paired with Nora Aunor in a musical "Nineteeners" but the chemistry didn't work and decided to bid the movie scene goodbye again. He staged his comeback in 1977 to do the film under Lino Brocka entitled "Inay" where his mother Alicia Vergel portrayed the title role. In the following year, Vergel switched from drama to action roles. His launching vehicle as an action star was in the film Noel San Miguel (Batang City Jail) in 1978. The movie gained positive reviews and made it to the box office. The movie stablished him as the newest action sensation during that time.

Vergel became the first movie star to appear in a First Philippine miniseries. The groundbreaking miniseries, "Malayo Pa Ang Umaga," was inspired by Stevan Javellana’s novel "Without Seeing the Dawn," the first Filipino novel written in English. Vergel portrayed the lead character, "Mario," an oppressed farmer, in a story set during the Japanese occupation of the Philippines. The miniseries aired on Channel 9 in seven installments during the summer of 1979, with Rey Valera composing its theme song.

In 1983, Vergel took on a highly challenging role in the classic film Pieta. Portraying "Rigor," an anti-hero lacking traditional heroic qualities, he departed from his typical roles in previous films, making this character his most iconic to date.

He had the lead role in the 1996 film Seth Corteza, which was about a man who inherits turf in the criminal underworld. He wants to make changes and faces the dangers that come about as a result. The film was directed by Efren C. Piñon.

In 2003, Vergel appeared in his last film Masamang Ugat from Viva Films.

== Controversies ==
In August 2007, a warrant for arrest was issued in Caloocan for rape cases filed against him in 2000, but he was later released. He was also linked to illegal drugs, but the cases against him were dismissed.

== Death ==
Vergel suffered a massive heart attack and slipped into a coma at The Chinese General Hospital and Medical Center, located in Santa Cruz, Manila and died at 3:17 am on December 15, 2007, at the age of 53.

== Filmography ==
Year	Title	Character	Notes
1959	Anak Ng Bulkan	Bentoy	
1977	Inay	Alex	
1978	Batang City Jail	Noel San Miguel	
1979	Hoodlum Killer	-	
1979	Teritoryo Ko Ito	Jun Javier / Batang Dewey	
1979	Mahal Kong Taksil	-	
1980	Pangkat: Do or Die	-	
1980	Kanto Boy	-	
1980	Kodigo Penal: The Valderrama Case	Capt. Nilo Valderrama	
1980	Hari ng Tondo Ikaw o Ako	Bingo Ocampo	
1980	Tatak Angustia	Eric	
1980	Siga	Atty. Alex Noriega	
1981	Kapwa Simaron	-	
1981	Dirty Games	-	
1981	Ako Laban Sa Lahat	-	
1981	Ang Babaeng Hinugot Sa Aking Tadyang	Mr. Delgado / Special Participation	
1981	Hantingan	-	
1981	Kamandag Ng Rehas Na Bakal	Sgt. Noel Santos	
1981	Hostage 72 Oras	-	
1981	Lukso Ng Dugo	-	
1981	Deadly Commando	-	
1981	Solid Alas	-	
1982	Mga Pambato	Tonyong Blackjack	
1982	Tres Kantos	-	
1982	Berdugo	Manuel	
1982	Annie Sabungera	Randy	
1982	Sugo	-	
1982	Waywaya	-	
1982	Ang Tapang Para Sa Lahat!	Ricardo	
1982	Zimatar	Prinsipe Akbar	
1983	Inside Job	Atty. Adolfo Guevarra	
1983	Pieta	Rigor	
1983	Kumusta Ka, Hudas?	-	
1983	Pusakal	-	
1984	Huwag Kang Papatay	-	
1984	Isang Dakot Na Lupa	Ador	
1984	Basag Ang Pula	Fernando	
1984	Tong	-	
1985	Jandro Nakpil: Halang ang Kaluluwa	Jandro Nakpil	
1985	Bomba Arienda	Roger "Bomba" Arienda	
1987	Ayokong Tumungtong Sa Lupa	-	
1988	Anak Ng Cabron	Donato Rios	
1989	Killer vs. Ninjas	-	
1989	Galit Sa Mundo	-	
1990	Higit Na Mas Matimbang Ang Dugo	Randolph (uncredited)	
1991	Sagad Hanggang Buto	Banjo	
1992	Totoy Guwapo: Alyas Kanto Boy	Totoy Castro/Totoy Guwapo	
1993	Kahit Ako'y Busabos	Giller	
1996	Seth Corteza	Seth Corteza	
1996	Ten Little Indians	Brandon Valdez	
1996	Huling Sagupaan	Samuel	
1997	Utang Ko Sa Iyo Ang Buhay Ko	Wex	
1997	Iligpit Si Victor Saraza	Victor Saraza	
1997	Jacob C.I.S.	Jacob/Gardo (Edgardo Mactan)	
1998	Sige Subukan Mo	David/Berting	
1998	Ang Joker At Ang Pistolero	Marvin / Special Participation	
1998	Abel Villarama: Armado	Abel Villarama	
2000	Katayan	-	
2001	Carta Alas: Huwag Ka Nang Humirit	Capt. Ted Cordero	
2003	Masamang Ugat	David	Last film appearance

== Accolades ==
Vergel was nominated five times.

FAMAS NOMINATION

1989 Best Actor for Anak ng Cabron (1988)

1986 Best Actor for Bomba Arienda (1985)

1985 Best Actor for Basag ang Pula (1984)

1984 Best Actor for Pieta (1983)

GAWAD URIAN NOMINATION

1986 Best Actor for Bomba Arienda (1985)

In 1989, Vergel received his Best Actor awards from the Gawad Urian and PMPC Star Awards for Movies for his role in the film Anak ng Cabron.
