= Luis Borromeo =

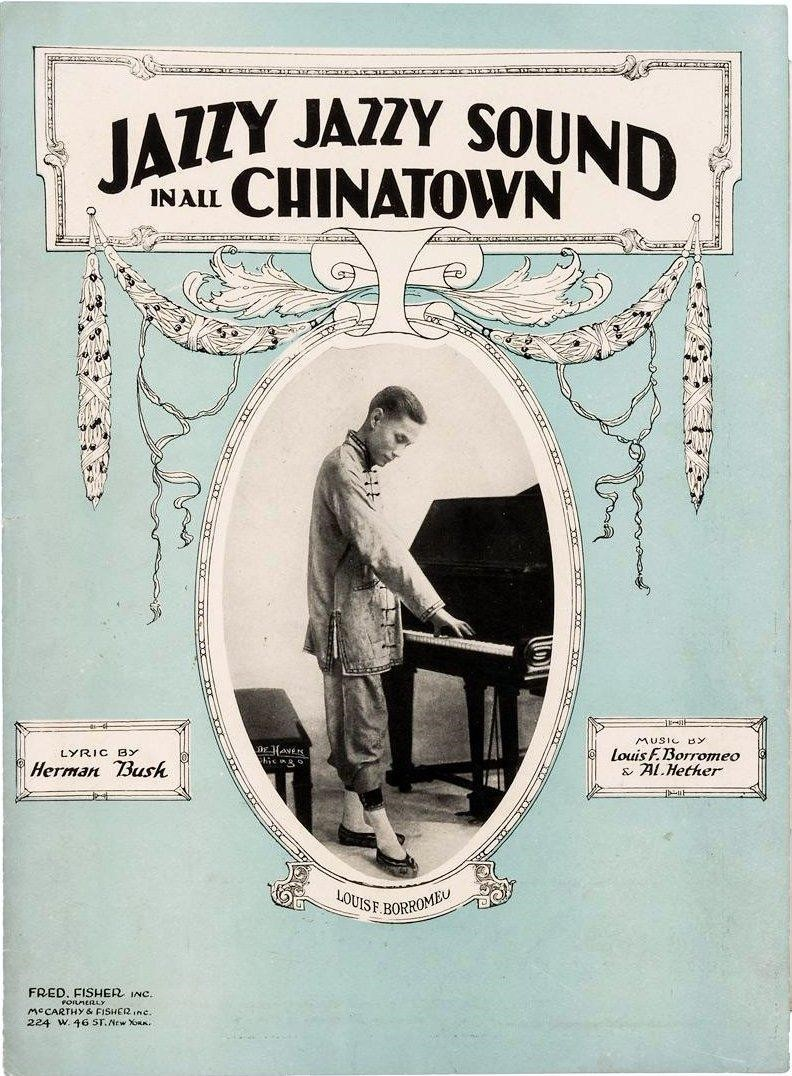
- Borromeo featured in a Chinese costume in the cover art for Jazzy Jazzy Sound in All Chinatown. 1920

Background information
- Also known as: Borromeo Lou
- Born: Luis Francisco Borromeo Veloso; October 10, 1879; Cebu City, Cebu, Philippine Islands
- Died: January 21, 1947 (aged 67) Cebu City, Cebu, Philippines
- Genres: Jazz
- Occupation: Vaudeville performer
- Instrument: Piano
- Years active: 1910s–?

Luis Francisco Borromeo Veloso (October 10, 1879 - January 21, 1947), also known as Borromeo Lou, was a Filipino jazz musician and entertainer. Known as the "King of Jazz" in the Philippines, Borromeo popularized the music genre of jazz in the Philippines. He is also noted for popularizing bodabil, a Filipinized variation of the Western performance of vaudeville. Borromeo reportedly coined the term himself from the Western counterpart of the art form, initially pronouncing bodabil as "vod-a-vil", more closely resembling the correct French pronunciation of the word.

== Biography ==
Borromeo is a native of Cebu coming from an affluent family. He first became involved in music in Leyte, where he had his early training in music and also went to the United States where he continued to pursue his studies in piano. In 1915, as an enthusiast in the performance arts, Borromeo went to attend the Pan-Pacific International Exposition in San Francisco to see stage shows and other performances. In one show, he was encourage by his fellow Filipinos to demonstrate his skills in playing the piano at the Dutch Pavilion. This led to him building a reputation as a musician.

The jazz pianist later secured a deal to perform at the Orpheum Circuit, an American theatre chain which staged live shows and featured films. For three years, he performed at Orpheum theaters under the stage name "Borromeo Lou" in various parts of the United States such as Chicago, New York, Portland, San Francisco, and Seattle often with singers (such as Isang Tapales) and dancers.

He then became part of the D’avigneau's Celestials with Chinese Americans, Shun Tok Sethe and Men Toy. The trio performed jazz music in ethnic Chinese costume and was noted for their "oriental syncopation".

In 1921, he returned the Philippines to perform at the Manila Carnival and formed a classical jazz band. The genre was received well by the local entertainment industry which lead to the development of a performance art which would later be known as bodabil.

Borromeo also featured in the 1922 Manila Carnival where his own entertainment troupe, Borromeo Lou & Co., Ltd. which featured himself, acrobats, magicians, and other performers and musicians, featured in their own revue Borromeo Follies upon request of the fair committee.

After the carnival, the group went on to perform as the Borromeo's Stadium Vod-a-Vil at the Olympic Stadium in Manila. Other similar groups were established by the mid-1920s. Borromeo also did performances in the provinces outside Manila. Bodabil remained prevalent throughout the rest of the American colonial period in the Philippines.

== Death ==
Borromeo died in 1947 in his hometown in Cebu City, Cebu Province in the Philippines.

== Legacy ==
Not much is known about Borromeo's later life and death since his death certificate in Cebu was lost during World War II. His children settled in the United States.
