= Vaudeville in the Philippines =

20th-century entertainment genre

- Other names: Bodabil
- Stylistic origins: Filipino folk music, Western vaudeville
- Cultural origins: Late 19th century, Filipino
- Typical instruments: Vocals

Vaudeville in the Philippines, more commonly referred in the Filipino vernacular as bodabil, was a popular genre of entertainment in the Philippines, emerging in the 1880s during the late Spanish period, but achieving more popularity after its promotion by the American administration from the 1910s to the mid-1960s. For decades, it competed with film, radio and television as the dominant form of Filipino mass entertainment. It peaked in popularity during the Japanese occupation in the Philippines from 1941 to 1945. Many of the leading figures of Philippine film in the 20th century, such as Dolphy, Nora Aunor, Leopoldo Salcedo and Rogelio de la Rosa, began their showbusiness careers in bodabil.

Bodabil is an indigenized form of vaudeville, introduced in the Philippines around the turn of the 20th century. It featured a hodgepodge of musical numbers, short-form comedy and dramatic skits, and even magic acts, often staged inside the theaters of Manila. Bodabil proved the vehicle for the popularization of musical trends and musicians, performance genres and performers.

== Origins ==
At the beginning of the American occupation of the Philippines at the turn of the 20th century, stage entertainment in the Philippines was dominated by the Spanish-influenced comedia ("komedya" in the Filipino vernacular) and the newly emergent zarzuela ("sarswela" in the Filipino vernacular). In order to entertain American troops stationed in the Philippines, vaudeville acts from outside the Philippines were brought in to provide entertainment. As early as 1901, a leading Manila theater, the Teatro Zorilla, would promote some of these visiting vaudeville troupes as "Novelties in Manila".

During these early years of vaudeville in the Philippines, most of the featured entertainers were non-Filipinos. By the middle of the 1910s, a few Filipino performers would begin to appear in vaudeville acts as well. The zarzuela star Atang de la Rama was among the first of such performers, as well as the singer Katy de la Cruz, who first appeared on Manila stages aged 7. The routines they would perform were featured as intermission numbers in between sarswelas. These intermission numbers were sometimes called "jamborees".

== Vaudeville to bodabil ==
In 1920, a Filipino entertainer named Luis Borromeo returned from North America, who performed under the stage name "Borromeo Lou", and organized what became the first Filipino bodabil company. The main showcase of Borromeo's company was an orchestral band, which played what he called "Classical-Jazz Music", and variety acts in between. Borromeo's band is credited as having popularized jazz in the Philippines. It was also Borromeo who dubbed the emerging form as "vod-a-vil", which soon became popularly known by its Filipinized name, bodabil.

In 1923, there were three theaters in Manila that were exclusively devoted to bodabil. By 1941, there were 40 theaters in Manila featuring bodabil shows. The popularity of bodabil was not confined to Manila stages. Bodabil routines were also staged in town fiestas and carnivals. The typical bodabil shows would feature a mixture of performances of American ballads, torch songs and blues numbers; dance numbers featuring tap dancers and chorus girls and jitterbug showcases; and even the occasional kundiman.

Within that period, established performers such as Katy de la Cruz and Borromeo continued to thrive. New stars also emerged, such as the singers Diana Toy and Miami Salvador; the dancer Bayani Casimiro, and the magician and Chaplin-imitator Canuplin. Many leading lights of Philippine cinema began their entertainment careers in bodabil during this period, such as Rogelio de la Rosa, Leopoldo Salcedo, Dely Atay-Atayan and Chichay. Bodabil thrived despite the emergence of Filipino film productions. Many movie theaters featured bodabil performances in between screenings, and many film and bodabil stars frequently crossed over from one genre to the other.

== Bodabil during World War II ==
The Japanese invasion of the Philippines in late 1941 led to a halt in film production in the country, at the insistence of the Japanese, who were not keen to allow Western influences to persist within the country. Bodabil, however, was permitted, and it became the predominant form of entertainment in the country. Many film actors whose careers had been stalled became regular performers in bodabil shows.

Among the performers whose careers were jumpstarted during this period were Panchito Alba, Anita Linda, Rosa Mia, the tandem of Pugo and Togo, and Dolphy, who started under the stage name "Golay" as a comic dance partner of Bayani Casimiro.

Many bodabil shows during the war incorporated subtle anti-Japanese and pro-American messages. Pugo and Togo had a popular routine where they portrayed Japanese soldiers wearing multiple wristwatches on both of their arms, and they were soon briefly incarcerated for that spoof. There were comedic and dramatic skits that referred to the impending return of "Mang Arturo", an allusion to General MacArthur's promise, "I shall return." Even guerrilla members attended bodabil shows, and when word reached the performers that the Kempetai were due to arrive, they'd break out into a special song that served as code to the guerillas to leave the premises.

== Post-war bodabil ==
Following the end of World War II, film production in the Philippines resumed, and many of bodabil's stars either returned or shifted to cinema. Bodabil however remained popular for the next two decades. A large credit to bodabil's continued popularity can be attributed to Lou Salvador, Sr., a performer with the stage name "Chipopoy" who shifted to production after the war. Salvador would become the most successful stage show impresario in the '40s and '50s. He organized several bodabil troupes and discovered a new generation of bodabil performers, such as the comedians Chiquito, Cachupoy and German Moreno, the singers Pepe Pimentel, Diomedes Maturan, and Eddie Peregrina.

Bodabil continued to capitalize on the latest trends in Western entertainment. It featured popular Latin dances such as the mambo and cha-cha, or the boogie, which was popularized by Chiquito. When rock and roll emerged in the 1950s, bodabil showcased Eddie Mesa, who became known as the "Elvis Presley of the Philippines". In the late 1950s, singers such as Nora Aunor, Elizabeth Ramsey, Pilita Corrales and Sylvia La Torre also plied the bodabil circuit. Bodabil had also started to incorporate burlesque numbers into its routines.

By the 1960s, bodabil had to compete with the rise of commercial television broadcasts in the Philippines. It underwent a swift decline, and by the late 1960s, the form drew on the limited market for its burlesque routines. The emergence of bomba films around 1969–1970, which killed off burlesque, also marked the end of bodabil.

After martial law was declared in 1972, President Ferdinand Marcos attempted to revive a sanitized form of bodabil. Theaters such as the Manila Grand Opera House featured bodabil routines, with slogans praising martial law rule piped into the theaters in between numbers. These efforts proved unpopular. In the 1980s, activist groups within the University of the Philippines also tried to utilize the bodabil format, using the medium to promote socially-conscious themes.

== Critical perspectives ==
While bodabil was undoubtedly popular and somewhat indigenized from vaudeville, it was hardly indigenous to the Philippines and seen as indicative of the pervasiveness of American culture in the country. Many of the cultural trends it popularized were Western or American in origin, though the interpreters largely Filipino. At the same time, many older, and equally colonial forms of stage entertainment such as the komedya and the sarswela declined due to the rise of bodabil.

The influence of bodabil in Filipino culture arguably persists to this day. Its hodgepodge of song and dance numbers are still recognizable in television variety shows and even in intermission numbers in political rallies.
