= Sampaguita Pictures =

Defunct Philippine major film studio

Sampaguita Pictures, Inc.
- Company type: Private
- Industry: Film production
- Founded: 1937; 89 years ago
- Defunct: 2005; 21 years ago
- Fate: Acquired 2005
- Headquarters: Granada Street, Valencia, New Manila, Quezon City, Philippines
- Key people: Azucena Vera-Perez (General Manager); Marichu Maceda (President); José O. Vera (Executive Producer); Pepito Vera-Perez (Producers); Goyito Vera-Perez (Associate Producers)
- Owner: Vera-Perez family

Sampaguita Pictures was a Philippine film production company. It was named for the Philippine national flower, sampaguita. Though no longer functioning, the company's Sampaguita Compound remains in Quezon City.

== History ==
Sampaguita Pictures was established in the last quarter of 1937. Its first feature-length film was Bituing Marikit, starring Elsa Oria and Rogelio dela Rosa. It was a box-office hit. The company continued to make films in the action, musical, horror and suspense genres.

Before World War II began, and the Japanese occupied the Philippines, several Sampaguita films enjoyed box office success in the region. Some of them employed the famous tandem of Carmen Rosales and Rogelio dela Rosa, like Panambitan, Pagsuyo, Jazmin and many more. But the first film made at the Sampaguita studio by Carmen and Rogelio was Takipsilim.

After the war ended and the Philippines was granted its independence by the United States, Sampaguita made several war pictures in 1946, including Guerilyera, with Carmen and newcomer Celso Baltazar, Maynila, the comeback picture of Corazon Noble featuring Tita Duran, and Isumpa mo Giliw, with husband-and-wife team Angel Esmeralda and Corazon Noble.

After several war musicals became popular, the studio created a new star team with real husband and wife Pancho Magalona and Tita Duran. They made several hits including Bulaklak Na Walang Pangalan, Huwag Ka Nang Magtampo, Sa Isang Sulyap Mo Tita, and Sa Isang Halik Mo Pancho.

In 1950, the studios were hit by fire and hundreds of film prints were destroyed. But in 1951, they top-billed the unknown Tessie Agana, the daughter of Linda Estrella, in her first lead role in Roberta, with another child actor Boy Alano and the film became the highest-grossing Philippine film of all time.

In the early fifties several actors appeared in the studio's productions, including Alicia Vergel and her husband César Ramírez in Ukkala, Diwani, the Philippine folk hero Bernardo Carpio, MN and many more.

In 1952 the Filipino-American Gloria Romero made her first full-length film as the partner of Cesar Ramirez in an action costume picture Palasig.

Another famous husband-and-wife team were Rita Gomez and Ric Rodrigo. They were popular together in their film Diyosa.

The infamous tandem of husband-and-wife Lolita Rodriguez and Eddie Arenas made some dramas together, like Kundiman ng Puso, Busabos, Cicatriz and Mapait na Lihim. The two later divorced. Arenas is still active in Philippine cinema while Rodriguez moved to the United States.

Another husband-and-wife team in the 1950s were Amalia Fuentes and Romeo Vasquez. Fuentes made her last appearance for Sampaguita in 1964, before leaving for another studio.

Though not as well remembered, many supporting actors and actresses, such as Imelda Concepcion, Nelly Baylon and Naty Bernardo worked in the Sampaguita system.

Susan Roces took her first lead role as a boxer in Sabungera opposite Luis Gonzales, but the film was not a box office hit. Fuentes and Roces are famous for their rivalry when they made the film Cover Girls in the 1960s.

By that time, a new manager, Dr. Jose R. Perez, took over the reins of Sampaguita.

In 1960, Sampaguita made Pitong Pagsisi supported by 20 Sampaguita stars, including the return of Paraluman who reigned in the studio in the late 40s.

In 1970s, the studio continued producing films albeit on a limited production, especially with the Nora Aunor-Tirso Cruz III tandem culminating in the 1971 film Guy and Pip. In 1982, after its last successful film Batch '81, Sampaguita Pictures stopped producing films and focused solely on distribution and post-production of films until 2005.

In March 1987, Sampaguita Pictures celebrated its 50th anniversary with a television special produced by Marichu Perez Maceda, the wife of politician Ernesto Maceda.

In 1996, the company ventured into television with GMA Network; they produced the drama anthology series Pira-pirasong Pangarap which lasted until 2003, which started another co-production Nagmamahal, Manay Gina. Both series were hosted by Gina de Venecia.

Unitel Pictures currently owns Sampaguita's film library. All of the films are currently archived and handled by the ABS-CBN Film Archives and the Film Development Council of the Philippines' National Film Archives of the Philippines.
