= List of Philippine films of the 1950s =

A list of films produced in the Philippines in the 1950s. For an A-Z see Category:Philippine films.

== 1950s ==
Title	Director	Cast	Production Company	Genre	Notes
1950
3 Balaraw	Cesar Gallardo	Jose Padilla Jr., Anita Linda, Fred Santos, Luz Kahanding, Ramon d'Salva, Luis San Juan, Tony Tolman, Fernando Santiago, Dely Atay-atayan, Kasupang, Bebong Osorio, Luis Vizconde, Abraham Cruz, Francisco Cruz, Bella Flores, Antonia Santos	Premiere Productions	Action	
13 Hakbang		Tessie Agana, Aruray, Jose de Villa, Linda Estrella, Marcela Garcia, Cesar Ramirez, Tolindoy	Sampaguita Pictures	Drama	
48 Oras	Gerardo de Leon	Rogelio de la Rosa, Virginia Montes, Enrico Pimentel, Lopito, Nena Cardenas, Oscar Keesee, Conrado Conde, Patria Plata, Bebong Osorio, Dely Atay-atayan, Totoy Torrente, Ponching Reyes, Tony Tolman, Deleng Tinoco, Max Alvarado, Francisco Cruz, Frankie Gordon, Romeo Guarin, Francisco Salcedo, Den Reed Lamosao	Premiere Productions	Action, Drama, Thriller	
Aklat Ng Pag-ibig	Domingo Principe	Rosa del Rosario, Rodolfo Ruiz, Sylvia Rosales, Roberto Rosales, Lily Miraflor, Lucas "Lolo Hugo" Paredes, Alma Bella, Citas Gonzales	Balintawak Pictures, Movietec	Drama	
Ang Bombero (Kaaway Ng Apoy)	Lamberto V. Avellana	Jose Padilla Jr., Carmen Rosales, Rita Amor, Naty Bernardo, Alfonso Carvajal, Horace Curry, Jose Cris Soto	LVN Pictures	Drama	first Filipino film about fire fighters
Ang Kampana Sa San Diego	Eduardo de Castro	Efren Reyes, Virginia Montes, Lopito, Oscar Keesee, Nati Rubi, Amelita Sol, Conrado Conde, Ramon D'Salva, Francisco Cruz, Luis Hector San Juan, Leonora Ruiz, Tony Tolman, Bebong Osorio, Violeta Baby, Elena Mayo	Premiere Productions	Drama	
Ang Magpapawid	Paquito Bolero	Carmen Rosales, Danilo Montes, Rosa Aguirre	Royal Productions	Drama	
Ang Prinsesa At Ang Pulubi	Eddie Romero (as Enrique Moreno)	Fred Montilla, Tessie Agana, Myrna Delgado, Arsenia Francisco	Sampaguita Pictures	Action, Fantasy	
Apat Na Alas	Prudencio Mariano	Manuel Conde, Delia Razon, Mario Montenegro, Johnny Reyes, Johnny Monteiro, Milagros Naval, Lou Salvador, Frankie Gordon, Joseph de Cordova, Africa de la Rosa, Jose Corazon de Jesus Jr., Andres Centenera, Mario Roldan, Miniong Alvarez, Horace Curry	LVN Pictures	Action, Fantasy	
Bandido	Ramon Estella	Efren Reyes, Virginia Montes, Enrico Pimentel, Fred Santos	Premiere Productions	Action, Western	
Batong Buhay (Sa Central Luson)	Ricardo Brillantes	Leopoldo Salcedo, Paraluman, Nita Javalera, Jesus Caballero, Gregorio Ticman, Patsy, Atang de la Rama, Martin Marfil, Davao Santiago, Jacinto Solomon, Ernesto Jacinto, Naty Alcaraz, Tinno Lapuz, Ernesto Monroy	Filipinas Pictures	Action, Romance, War	
Bella Vendetta	Paquito Bolero	Patricia Mijares, Ben Rubio, Danilo Montes	Royal Productions	Action, Drama	
Bertong Balutan (A Miracle Of God)		Fernando Poe, Patricia Mijares, Fred Penalosa, Salvador Zaragosa	Associated Artists	Drama	
Bulaklak Ng Digmaan		Virgilio Araneta, Rosa del Rosario, Carlos Padilla Sr.	Liwayway		
Campo O'Donnell	Nardo Vercudia	Pancho Magalona, Linda Estrella, Tessie Agana, Myrna Delgado, Aruray, Cesar Ramirez, Tolindoy	Sampaguita Pictures	Drama, War	This film showed the pain and panic of evacuation during the war.
Candaba	Gregorio Fernandez	Tessie Quintana, Teody Belarmino, Tony Santos, Evelyn Villar, Jose Corazon de Jesus, Nela Alvarez, Armando Garces, Eusebio Gomez, Gregorio Fernandez, Natoy Catindig, Ven Medina, Hermie Alvarez, Lina Luna	LVN Pictures	Action, Drama	
Dalawang Bandila		Leopoldo Salcedo, Paraluman, Virgilio Araneta, Eddie Infante	Mayon Pictures	Drama	
Dayang Dayang	Nemesio E. Caravana	Mila del Sol, Armando Goyena, Johnny Reyes, Alfonso Carvajal	LVN Pictures	Drama, Period	
Doble Cara	Gerardo de Leon	Rogelio de la Rosa, Nena Cardenas, Enrico Pimentel, Oscar Keesee, Patria Plata, Amelita Sol, Conrado Conde, Eddie Infante, Gil de Leon	Premiere Productions	Action	
Doctor X	Richard Abelardo	Pugo, Togo, Tony Santos, Lila Luna, Monang Carvajal, Jose Corazon de Jesus Jr.	LVN Pictures	Comedy, Mystery	
Edong Mapangarap	Manuel Silos	Pugo, Togo, Eddie San Jose, Joan Page, Patsy Pachochay, Fely Constantino, Jose Luz Bernardo, Cita Javellana, Ven Medina, Hernando Alvarez, Fidencio Belizario, Ely Ventus	LVN Pictures	Comedy	
Genghis Khan	Lou Salvador, Manuel Conde	Manuel Conde, Elvira Reyes, Inday Jalandoni, Jose Villafranca, Lou Salvador, Africa de la Rosa, Ric Bustamante, Ely Nakpil, Johnny Monteiro, Andres Centenera, Don Dano, Leon Lizares, Tony Cruz, James Agee (as narrator in US Version)	MC Production	Action, Historical	First Filipino film to compete at an international film festival (Venice International Film Festival 1952). The prints of this film was found in Venice Film Festival vaults and was restored at L'Immagine Ritrovata. On September 6, 2012, the film was screened in the festival as a special retrospective of cinema classics among others. Official submission of the Philippines for the 'Best Foreign Language Film' category of the 26th Academy Awards in 1954.
Gulong Ng Palad	Consuelo P. Osorio	Jose Padilla Jr., Arsenia Francisco, Lopito, Ramon D'Salva, Patria Plata, Ester Buenaobra, Luis San Juan, Nati Rubi, Bebong Osorio, Clarita Benitez	Premiere Productions	Drama	
Hantik	Lamberto V. Avellana	Leopoldo Salcedo, Celia Flor, Eusebio Gomez, Jose Padilla Jr., Tony Santos	LVN Pictures	Action, Drama	
His Darkest Hour	Antonio G. Verches	Erlinda Cortes, Fred Castro, Cris de Vera	Lebran Productions	Action, Crime	
Hiwaga ng Tulay na Bato	Consuelo P. Osorio	Efren Reyes, Anita Linda, Virginia Montes, Conrado Conde, Francisco Cruz, Ramon D'Salva, Amelita Sol	Premiere Productions	Action	
Huling Patak Ng Dugo	Nardo Vercudia	Pancho Magalona, Alicia Vergel, Chichay, Tolindoy, Cesar Ramirez, Eddie Garcia	Sampaguita Pictures	Action, Drama	Serialized in Bulaklak Magazine.
Huramentado	George Santos	Leopoldo Salcedo, Eduardo del Mar, Evelyn Villar, Rosa Aguirre, Pedro Faustino, Al Johnston	Liwayway Pictures	Action, War	
Huwag Ka Nang Magtampo	Lorenzo Perez Tuells	Tita Duran, Pancho Magalona, Teresita Martinez, Tito Arevalo, Boy Spanky, Chichay, Tolindoy, Cesar Ramirez	Sampaguita Pictures	Musical, Romance	First movie of Chichay
In Despair	Lamberto V. Avellana	Mila del Sol, Jaime de la Rosa, Tony Santos, Nenita Vidal, Antonia Santos, Carlos Aguilar, Johnny Astor, Chito Reyes, Nora Minda, Etang Discher, Ben Rubio	LVN Pictures	Drama	
Kamay Ni Satanas	Gerardo de Leon	Leila Morena, Reynaldo Dante, Nena Cardenas, Fred Santos, Patria Plata, Oscar Keesee, Conrado Conde, Arturo Lerma, Rino Bermudez, Tony Tolman, Vicente Liwanag, Agapito Santiago	Premiere Productions	Horror	
Kami Ang Sugatan (Wings Over Bataan)	Ricardo Del Prado	Fernando Poe, Pacita Francisco, Ben Rubio, Corazon Garcia, Fred Penalosa, Elena Acosta	Royal Productions		
Kay Ganda Mo Neneng	Octavio Silos	Tita Duran, Pancho Magalona, Tessie Martinez, Tolindoy, Aruray, Pedro Faustino, Jose Luz Bernardo, Bart del Rosario, Rebecca del Rio, Aring Bautista, Dolores Criscini, Mely Lim, Jose Salameda, Pablo Raymundo	Sampaguita Pictures	Musical	Serialized in Liwayway Magazine.
Kenkoy	Ramon A. Estella	Lopito, Virginia Montes, Eddie Infante, Lopita, Bob Padilla, Benny Mack, Dely Atay-Atayan, Tommy Weesom	Premiere Productions	Comedy	Based on the popular comic character and novel made by Tony Velasquez
Kilabot Sa Makiling	Billy Icasiano, Artemio B. Tecson	Oscar Moreno, Lilian Leonardo, Chichay, Tolindoy, Eddie Garcia	Sampaguita Pictures	Action, Drama	Serialized in Bulaklak Magazine and created by Jose L. Santos and Cecilio V. Pamintuan
Kontrabando	Gregorio Fernandez	Jaime de la Rosa, Celia Flor, Tony Santos, Milagros Naval, Gregorio Fernandez, Eusebio Gomez, Ezar Visenio, Armando Garces, Martin Marfil, Jose Corazon de Jesus Jr., Natoy B. Catindig	LVN Pictures	Action, Drama	In response to the effort of the Philippine government against the spread of communism in the country in the 1950s, LVN Pictures produced three anti-communist films. This is the first film. The others were Korea (1952) and Huk sa bagong pamumuhay (1953). Serialized in the Bagong Buhay Magazine.
Kulog Sa Tag-araw		Chichay, Van de Leon, Pedro Faustino, Bella Flores, Lillian Leonardo, Oscar Moreno, Tolindoy	Sampaguita Pictures	Drama	
Kundiman Ng Luha	Consuelo P. Osorio	Rosa del Rosario, Leopoldo Salcedo, Domingo Principe, Sylvia Rosales, Rolando Liwanag, Aruray, Batotoy, Pedro Faustino, Jose Luz Bernardo, Perla Villamor, Romana Palma, Gloria Marasigan	Balintawak Pictures	Drama, Romance	
Magkumpareng Putik	Manuel Silos	Lilia Dizon, Pugo, Togo	LVN Pictures	Comedy, War	
Mahal Mo Ba Ako?	Susana C. De Guzman	Tony Arnaldo, Rosa Rosal, Delia Razon	LVN Pictures	Drama, Romance	
Makasalanang Banal		Linda Estrella	Sampaguita Pictures	Romance	
Mapuputing Kamay	Fausto J. Galauran, Octavio Silos	Pancho Magalona, Lillian Leonardo, Alicia Vergel, Tessie Martinez, Norma Vales	Sampaguita Pictures	Action, War	Serialized in Bulaklak Magazine.
Mga Baguio Cadets	Lorenzo P. Tuells	Norma Blancaflor, Chichay, Linda Estrella, Ernesto La Guardia, Tolindoy	Sampaguita Pictures		
Misteryoso	Manuel Silos	Armando Goyena, Tessie Quintana, Tony Santos	LVN Pictures	Action, Drama, Mystery, Romance, Suspense	
Muntinglupa	Luis F. Nolasco	Rodolfo Ruiz, Ben Perez, Pancho Pelagio, Carol Varga	Nolasco Bros.	Action, Drama	
Mutya Ng Pasig	Richard Abelardo	Jose Padilla Jr., Rebecca Gonzales, Teody Belarmino, Delia Razon, Roger Nite, Lily Miraflor, Tony Dantes, Pat Salvador, Tolindoy, Angge, Luis San Juan, Tomas Esteban, Dimas Cortez, Milagros Erana, Lito Carvajal, Don Diego	LVN Pictures	Drama	
Nagsaulian Ng Kandila	Jose Climaco	Pugo, Togo, Teody Belarmino, Evelyn Villar	LVN Pictures	Comedy	
Nothing But Women		Rolf Bayer, Scott Elliott, Carmen Rosales		Musical, Romance	
Nuno Sa Punso	Richard Abelardo	Mila del Sol, Jaime de la Rosa, Gil de Leon, Eusebio Gomez, Lila Luna, Jose Cris Soto, Pamboy, Engracio Ibarra, Justina David, Florentino Ballecer, Tony Dantes, Jose de Castro Jr., Amandita Llave	LVN Pictures	Fantasy, Romance	
Pagtutuus	Gregorio Fernandez	Armando Goyena, Tessie Quintana, Alfonso Carvajal, Nenita Vidal, Engracio Ibarra, Cora Madrid, Armando Garces, Tita Ramirez, Ezar Visenio	LVN Pictures	Action, Drama	
Pedro, Pablo, Juan at Jose	Carlos Vander Tolosa	Leila Morena, Carding de la Fuente, Teddy Benavídez, Eduardo del Mar	Excelsior Picture	Drama, Romance	
Princesa Sa Tawi-Tawi	Rudy Robles	Rudy Robles, Ruby Sol, Billy Surot Viscarra	RPR Productions		
Prinsipe Amante	Lamberto V. Avellana, W.H. Smith	Rogelio de la Rosa, Delia Razon, Ben Rubio, Lila Luna, Eliseo Carvajal, Naty Bernardo	LVN Pictures	Drama, Fantasy	
Punglo At Pag-ibig	Ramon A. Estella	Jose Padilla Jr., Anita Linda, Lopito, Fred Santos, Patria Plata, Ramon D'Salva, Lopita, Tessie Villamor, Tony Tolman, Larry Santiago, Tor Reyes	Premiere Productions	Adventure, Comedy, Drama, Musical, Romance, War	
Siete Infantes De Lara	Manuel Conde	Manuel Conde, Elvira Reyes, Luningning, Jose Villafranca, Rolando Liwanag, Ely Nakpil, Africa de la Rosa, Andres Centenera, Cecilio Joaquin, Isa Rino, Nick Bustamante, Gracita Dominguez, Siete Infantes de Lara, Romano Castellvi, Eddie Garcia, Mario Montenegro, Pepe Martinez	MC Production	Adventure	
Sigaw Ng Bayan	Carlos Vander Tolosa	Fernando Poe, Norma Blancaflor, Fernando Royo, Rolando Liwanag, Fred Penalosa, Rita Rivera, Jose Cris Soto, Sepo del Rosario	Royal Production	Action	
Sohrab at Rustum	Nemesio Caravana	Rogelio de la Rosa, Lilia Dizon, Armando Goyena, Rosa Rosal, Evelyn Villar, Rita Amor, Alfonso Carvajal, Bayani Casimiro, Jose Corazon de Jesus Jr.	LVN Pictures	Action, Adventure, Fantasy	
Sundalong Talahib	Ramon A. Estella	Ricardo Brillantes, Mona Lisa	Filipinas Productions	Action	
Takas Sa Bataan	Olive La Torre	Norma Blancaflor, Fred Montilla, Joan Page, Danilo Montes	Sampaguita Pictures	Action, War	
Tatlong Bagwis (Mga Anak Ng Bayan)	R. Martelino	Leopoldo Salcedo, Ben Perez, Ding Tello, Evelyn Villa, Ana Cristina	Cor-Qui Pictures	Action, Drama	
Tatlong Limbas	Carlos Vander Tolosa	Leopoldo Salcedo, Mila del Sol, Ben Rubio, Ben Perez	Royal Production	Action, Drama	
Tenyente Ramirez	Octavio Silos	Fred Montilla, Alicia Vergel, Joan Page, Cesar Ramirez, Rudy Francisco	Sampaguita Pictures	Action, Drama, War	
The Pirates go to Town	Fermin Barva	Lirio del Valle, Federico del Puerto, Cris de Vera, Ching Tello, Angelo Castro, Pedro Faustino	Lebran Productions	Action, Adventure	
The Song Of Sto. Tomas		Fara Lizardo, Ricardo Montes (aka Ric Rodrigo), Gerry Val, Charo de Oteyza, Lou Salvador, Roberto Castel, Lilia Alvarez, Gloria Belisario, Julio Esteban Anguita	Lebran Production	Musical, Romance	
The Spell	Lorenzo Perez Tuells	Leopoldo Salcedo, Erlinda Cortes, Eddie del Mar, Cris de Vera, Gerry Val, Paco Zamora, Lily Miraflor, Vera Legaspi, Jose Bustamante, Isa Rino, Cesar Calvo	Lebran Productions	Drama, Mystery	First English film of Leopoldo Salcedo
Tigang na Lupa	Alex M. Sunga	Rogelio de la Rosa, Leila Morena, Fred Santos, Nati Rubi, Eddie Infante, Conrado Conde, Deleng Tinoco, Dadang Ortega, Fernando Santiago, Menggay, Kasupang	Premiere Productions	Action, War	
Tininti Del Barrio	Susana C. De Guzman	Lilia Dizon, Teody Belarmino, Gregorio Ticman, Bayani Casimiro, Patsy, Joseph de Cordova, Priscilla Cellona, Horace Curry	LVN Pictures	Comedy	
Tubig Na Hinugasan	Paquito Bolero	Luningning, Reynaldo Dante, Pacita Francisco, Domingo Principe, Ben Rubio, Sonia Reyes, Lilia Varles, Amelita Sol, Jaime Castellvi, Engracio Ibarra, Nati Rubi, Rico Romero, Rolando Liwanag, Ester Buenaobra, Norma Lopa, Vicenta Fernandez, Tony Moguies, Canuplin, Rosa-Rio Lam, Rafael Jimenez, Leonora Ruiz, Sese Trinidad, Maty Torres, Ambrosio del Rosario, Jose P. Evangelista, Veronica Aranda, Urbano Aranda, Ramon Correa, Antonia Gatdula, Juanita Rodriguez, Paquito Bolero, Tor Villano	Quezon Memorial Pictures	Drama	
Umaga Na Neneng	Octavio Silos	Tita Duran, Pancho Magalona	Sampaguita Pictures	Comedy, Romance	
Wanted: Patay O Buhay		Conrado Conde, Ramon D'Salva	Premiere Productions	Action	
1951
10th Battalion Sa 38th Parallel, Korea	Gerardo de Leon	Efren Reyes, Lopito, Eddie Infante, Oscar Keesee, Arturo Lerma, Tony Tolman, Ruben Rustia, Pancho Pelagio, Nita Ramos, Alice Contreras, Mercedes Cruz, Francisco Cruz, Tony Liwanag, Lito Anzures, Nello Nayo	Premiere Productions	Action, War	
Amor Mio	Lamberto V. Avellana	Jaime de la Rosa, Tessie Quintana, Rosa Rosal, Tony Santos, Nida Blanca, Rino Bermudez, Norma Blancaflor, Bayani Casimiro, Armando Goyena, Leopoldo Salcedo, Gregorio Ticman, Nestor de Villa	LVN Pictures	Drama, Romance	
Anak Ng Pulubi	Tony Arnaldo	Mila del Sol, Jaime de la Rosa, Evelyn Villar, Alfonso Carvajal, Rosa Aguirre, Justina David, Gloria Seres, Amado Cortez, Tessie Quintana	LVN Pictures	Drama	
Anak Ko...!	Fernando Poe	Carmen Rosales, Danilo Montes, Luningning, Manuel Ubaldo, Mila Nimfa	LVN Pictures	Drama	
Ang Aking Kahapon		Etang Discher, Lillian Leonardo, Carlos Padilla Sr., Nati Rubi	Tamaraw Pictures	Drama	
Ang Tapis Mo Inday		Rosa Aguirre, Angge, Teody Belarmino, Naty Bernardo, Amado Cortez, Gil de Leon, Celia Flor, Evelyn Villar	LVN Pictures	Drama	
Anghel Ng Pag-ibig		Tessie Agana, Boy Alano, Chichay, Jose de Villa, Linda Estrella, Lillian Leonardo, Tolindoy	Sampaguita Pictures	Romance	
Apoy Na Ginatungan	Paquito Bolero	Erlinda Cortes, Victor Sevilla, Lita Rio, Rosa Aguirre, Fred Penalosa, Rafael Jimenez, Lolay, Ben Cosca, Violeta Baby, Nobel Macabasco, Teroy De Guzman	Royal Productions	Drama, Romance	
Babae, babae at babae pa	Lorenzo P. Tuells	Patsy, Sonia Reyes, Carmen Rosales	Sampaguita Pictures	Drama	
Bahay Na Tisa	Conrado Conde	Dely Atay-atayan, Conrado Conde, Ramon d'Salva	Premiere Productions	Drama	
Basag Na Manika	Fernando Poe	Mila Nimfa, Ben Perez, Amelia Saginsin, Sonia Reyes, Corazon Rivas, Bining Lopez, Oscar Obligacion, Dolphy Quizon, Ben Cosca, Noracid Morelos	Royal Productions	Drama	The last film to be directed by Fernando Poe before his untimely death on the night before this film was about to release in Clover Theater October 23. As a show of tribute to the late director, the release of the film was suspended and the theater where it was supposed to be shown was closed for a day. Maria Clara Award Winner 1950. Serialized in Liwayway Magazine.
Batas Ng Daigdig	Artemio Marquez	Fred Montilla, Linda Estrella, Tessie Agana, Rudy Francisco, Rosa Mia, Vic Andaya, Jose de Villa, Pedro Faustino, Bella Flores, Horacio Morelos, Sonia Reyes	Sampaguita Pictures	Drama	
Bayan O Pag-ibig	Gregorio Fernandez	Rogelio de la Rosa, Rosa Rosal, Tessie Quintana, Ben Rubio, Tony Santos, Frankie Gordon, Justina David, Armando Garces, Engracio Ibarra, Nora Linda, Miguel Lopez, Ezar Visenio	LVN Pictures	Action, Drama	
Berdugo Ng Mga Anghel	Octavio Silos	Oscar Moreno, Alicia Vergel, Tessie Martinez	Sampaguita Pictures	Drama	
Bernardo Carpio	Benjamin Resella, Artemio B. Tecson	Cesar Ramirez, Alicia Vergel, Bella Flores, Bert Olivar, Pedro Faustino, Rosa Mia, Totoy Torrente, Boy Madanba, Maty Torres	Sampaguita Pictures	Action, Adventure, Fantasy	First Filipino film to employ thousands of extras or bit players
Bisig Ng Manggagawa	Ricardo Brillantes	Rosa Aguirre, Norma Blancaflor, Romy Brion, Fernando Royo, Leopoldo Salcedo	Leopoldo Salcedo Production	Drama	
Dalawang Prinsipeng Kambal	Manuel Silos	Pugo, Togo, Teody Belarmino, Milagros Naval, Angge, Joseph de Cordova, Gil de Leon	LVN Pictures	Action, Fantasy	
Darna	Fernando Poe	Rosa del Rosario, Mila Nimfa, Ben Perez, Manuel Ubaldo, Cristina Aragon, Elena Mayo, Leonora Ruiz	Royal Films	Adventure, Fantasy	The very first Darna film inspired by Mars Ravelo comic character.
David At Goliath	Nemesio E. Caravana	Armando Goyena, Tessie Quintana, Lou Salvador, Milagros Naval, Jose Corazon de Jesus	LVN Pictures	Action, Biblical, Drama, Religious	The first color film fully processed in the Philippines utilizing the Ansco color process.
Diego Silang	Gerardo de Leon	Jose Padilla Jr., Leila Morena, Nena Cardenas, Lopito, Fred Santos, Oscar Keesee, Dely Atay-atayan, Jose Iturbi	Premiere Productions	Action, Biography, Historical	
Dinukot	George Santos	Eddie del Mar	Liwayway	Drama	
Dugo Ng Bataan		Don Dano, Mona Lisa, Fernando Royo, Leopoldo Salcedo	Zamboanga Pictures	War	
Dugo Sa Dugo	Gregorio Fernandez	Lilia Dizon, Mario Montenegro, Johnny Reyes, Inday Jalandoni, Maria Cristina, Rino Bermudez, Florentino Ballecer, Eusebio Gomez, Natoy Katindig, Horace Curry, Mario Roldan, Lourdes Yumul	LVN Pictures	Drama	
Dugong Bughaw	Nardo Vercudia	Oscar Moreno, Alicia Vergel, Tessie Martinez, Norma Vales, Ernesto Garcia, Bert Olivar, Jose de Villa, Tony Suarez, Ricardo Mirasol, Ruben Arcangel, Totoy Torrente, Batotoy, Rebecca del Rio	Sampaguita Pictures	Action, Adventure, Fantasy	
Gamugamong Naging Lawin	Eduardo de Castro	Leila Morena, Danilo Montes, Arturo Lerma, Nati Rubi, Cecilio Joaquin, Tony Tolman, Francisco Cruz, Fernando Santiago, Dadang Ortega, Candida Valderama, Nello Nayo, Leonora Ruiz	Premiere Productions	Drama, Musical, Romance	
Haring Cobra	Richard Abelardo	Rogelio de la Rosa, Lilia Dizon, Jose Vergara, Jose Corazon de Jesus Jr., Ven Medina, Casmot, Ramon Roy, Tita Ramirez, Etang Discher, Akong, Dimas Cortez	LVN Pictures	Action, Fantasy	
Hiwaga Ng Langit	Fermin Barva	Rico Romero, Gracita Dominguez, Baby Linda Santos, Violeta Baby, Melanie, Jose Troni, Juan Urbano, Andy Bravo, Rudy Bierra, Tessie Abad, Boy Roland, Nora Dee, Emelda Pastor, Laura Alegra	Fortune Pictures	Drama	
Huling Konsiyerto	Don Alcaraz	Carmen Rosales, Domingo Principe, Fara Lizardo, Jose Villafranca, Rosa Aguirre, Antonio de la Moguies, Paco Zamora, Rene Antonio, Panchito, Corazon Rivas, Milo Cristobal, Eduardo Rivera, Marilou Baby, Meliza Ibañez	Benito Bros. Pictures	Comedy, Drama, Musical, Romance	
Irog, Paalam	Tony Cayado	Leopoldo Salcedo, Alma Bella, Rosa Aguirre, Jose Luz Bernardo, Pedro Faustino, Jose Villafranca	Sampaguita Pictures	Drama	
Isinanlang Pag-ibig	Domingo Principe	Fred Montilla, Erlinda Cortes, Lydia Montañez, Jose Villafranca, Rosa Aguirre, Rene Antonio, Antonio de la Moguies, Tita Aragon, Boy Roland, Tony Camonte, Horacio Morelos, Ben de Luna, Josefina Antonio, Angelita Cruz, Marcial Glorioso	Benito Bros. Pictures	Action, Drama	
Kadakilaan	Consuelo P. Osorio	Ramon D'Salva, Anita Linda	Dalisay Pictures	Drama	
Kapitan Bagwis	Cesar Gallardo	Efren Reyes, Anita Linda, Lopito, Oscar Keesee, Patria Plata, Nati, Rubi, Arturo Lerma, Vicente Liwanag, Francisco Cruz, Pepe Bustamante, Luis Vizconde, Pancho Pelagio	Premiere Productions	Action, Adventure, Family, Romance	
Kasaysayan Ni Dr. Ramon Selga	Octavio Silos	Oscar Moreno, Fred Montilla, Linda Estrella, Tessie Agana, Myrna Delgado, Teresita Martinez, Rosa Mia, Aruray, Maria Cristina, Dolores Criscini, Jose de Villa, Aring Bautista, Bartolome del Rosario	Sampaguita Pictures	Drama	
Kasintahan Sa Pangarap	Enrique Moreno	Tita Duran, Pancho Magalona, Tolindoy, Aruray	Sampaguita Pictures	Musical	
La Roca Trinidad	Carlos Padilla	Leopoldo Salcedo, Lydia Montañez, Rosa Aguirre, Paco Zamora, Lani O. Padilla, Jose Oledan, Pablo Virtuoso, Amandita, Luis del Rey	LGS Productions	Drama; Romance	
Labis Na Pagtitipid	Consuelo P. Osorio	Arsenia Francisco, Reynaldo Dante, Lopito	Premiere Productions	Drama; Romance	
Lagrimas (Anak Ng Luha)	Tor Villano	Lita Rio, Jaime Castellvi, Salvador Zaragoza, Jose Cris Soto, Vicente Liwanag, Eduardo Rivera, Marcela Garcia, Luz Noche, Isidro Francisco, Edgardo Llanes	Maharlika Pictures	Drama	
Lihim Ni Bathala		Manuel Barbeyto, Teody Belarmino, Paco Zamora	Royal Films	Drama	
Mag-inang Ulila	Fernando Poe	Rosa del Rosario, Danilo Montes, Lita Rio, Ben Perez, Manuel Ubaldo	Royal Productions	Musical	
Makapili		Justina David, Eddie del Mar, Pedro Faustino, Jose Cris Soto	Liwayway Pictures	Drama	
Maria Bonita	Manuel A. Garcia	Lydia Montañez, Elena Mayo, Bayani Casimiro, Jose Cris Soto, Ernie Javier, Lucy Moran, Rene Antonio, Babes Edwards, Luz Gutierrez, Irene Gutiérrez Caba, Bill O'Brian, Shirley Santos, Larry Allan, Manolo Valdes	Royal Productions	Musical	
Munting Anghel	Artemio Marquez	Nena Cardenas, Fred Santos, Patria Plata, Baby Linda, Amelita Sol	Premiere Productions	Drama	
Nanay Ko	Fernando Poe	Luningning, Carmen Rosales, Victor Sevilla	Sampaguita Pictures	Drama	
Nasaan Ka Giliw	Tony Arnaldo, Jose Climaco	Florentino Ballecer, Amado Cortez, Tessie Quintana, Nenita Vidal, Lourdes Yumul	LVN Pictures	Romance	
Pag-asa	Lamberto V. Avellana	Priscilla Cellona, Armando Goyena, Ike Jarlego Jr., Rosa Aguirre, Gregorio Ticman, Naty Bernardo, Paco Zamora, Miniong Alvarez, Leonora Ruiz, Leony Recto	LVN Pictures	Drama, Romance	first leading of Priscilla Cellona.
Prinsipe Amante sa Rubitanya	Lamberto V. Avellana	Rogelio de la Rosa, Delia Razon, Rosa Rosal, Tony Santos, Nida Blanca, Jose Corazon de Jesus Jr.	LVN Pictures	Action; Adventure; Fantasy	
Prinsipe Don Juan		Anita Linda	Premiere Productions	Adventure	
Probinsyano	Tony Arnaldo	Jaime de la Rosa, Evelyn Villar, Milagros Naval, Alfonso Carvajal, Miniong Alvarez	LVN Pictures	Drama	
Pulo Ng Engkanto	Oscar del Rosario	Lilia Dizon, Pugo, Togo, Alfonso Carvajal, Jose Corazon de Jesus Jr., Cecilio Joaquin, Ben Medina, Zony Quizon, H.C. Curry, Tony Dantes, Gallardo Acuña, Hermino Alvarez, Ely Ventus, Jerry Tecson	LVN Pictures	Adventure; Comedy; Musical; Romance	
Reyna Elena	Susana C. de Guzman	Jaime de la Rosa, Mila del Sol, Rosa Rosal, Tony Arnaldo, Gil de Leon, Etang Discher, Africa de la Rosa	LVN Pictures	Drama; Romance	
Roberta	Olive La Torre	Tessie Agana, Van de Leon, Bella Flores, Maria Cristina, Rosa Mia, Jose de Villa, Aruray, Boy Alano, Tony Cayado, Candida Valderama, Pablo Raymundo, Ric Flores, Pablo Naval, Helen Miraflor, Batotoy	Sampaguita Pictures	Drama	The box office hit film saved the production studio from bankruptcy after a huge fire of 1951 destroyed hundreds of film prints destroyed. It also gave fame to the rising child star of the decade Tessie Agana in her first lead role. Won for Rosa Mia a Maria Clara Award for Best Supporting Actress. Film debut of Boy Alano
Romeo At Julieta	Ralph Brambles Jr. Prudencio Mariano	Oscar Moreno, Erlinda Cortes, Johnny Monteiro, Fernando Royo, Andres Centenera, Africa de la Rosa, Gil de Leon, Nati Rubi, Jose Villafranca, Cecilio Joaquin, Oscar Obligacion	Lebran Productions	Drama; Romance	based on William Shakespeare's play
Rosario Cantada	Paquito Bolero	Rosa del Rosario, Erlinda Cortes, Lita Rio, Ben Perez	Royal Productions	Drama	
Sa Oras Ng Kasal		Ramon d'Salva, Tino de Lara, Arsenia Francisco, Nati Rubi	Premiere Productions	Romance	
Santa Cristina		Efren Reyes, Virginia Montes, Ramon d'Salva, Arsenia Francisco, Amelita Sol	Premiere Productions	Drama	
Satur	Lamberto V. Avellana	Manuel Conde, Jaime de la Rosa, Delia Razon, Alfonso Carvajal, Rosa Aguirre, Florentino Ballecer, Joseph de Cordova, Diana Recto, Andres Centenera, Pelagio Balmori	LVN Pictures	Horror	serialized in Pilipino Komiks in 1950
Shalimar	Richard Abelardo	Jaime de la Rosa, Delia Razon, Ben Rubio, Lila Luna, Bayani Casimiro, Horace Curry, Eusebio Gomez	LVN Pictures	Adventure; Drama; Romance	
Sigfredo	Manuel Conde	Manuel Conde, Elvira Reyes, Erlinda Cortes, Fernando Royo, Johnny Monteiro, Jose Villafranca, Gil de Leon, Ely Nakpil, Andres Centenera, Ric Bustamante, Doro Crisostomo, Africa de la Rosa	Lebran Productions	Action; Adventure; Fantasy	based on the German epic poem Nibelungenlied
Singsing Na Sinulid	Eduardo de Castro	Rosa del Rosario, Teody Belarmino, Cristina Aragon, Antonio Roldan, Zony Quizon, Paco Zamora, Nati Rubi, Pancho Pelagio, Luis San Juan, Ding Tello, Nello Nayo, Francisco Cruz, Conchita Vizconde	Royal Productions	Drama, Romance	
Sisa	Gerardo de Leon	Anita Linda, Reynaldo Dante, Eduardo del Mar, Eddie Infante, Nati Rubi, Tony Tolman, Pancho Pelagio, Ruben Rustia, Rosita Noble, Bebong Osorio, Francisco Cruz, Fernando Santiago, Don Dano, Andres Benitez, Boy Francisco, Zaldy Zschornack	Premiere Productions	Drama	Winner of two Maria Clara Awards - Best Direction (Gerardo de Leon) and Best Actress (Anita Linda) Director Gerardo, while doing this film, made an "aesthetic promise" to make a full-length feature on the two novels of Filipino patriot Jose Rizal - Noli Me Tangere (1961) and El Filibusterismo (1962). Film debut of Zaldy Zschornack who was named after the Filipino hero Jose Rizal, the writer of "Noli Me Tangere" upon which a popular character of this novel inspired this film of the same title character.
Tagailog	Consuelo P. Osorio	Efren Reyes, Nena Cardenas, Lopito, Helen Grace Prospero, Ruben Rustia, Ester Buenaobra, Nati Rubi, Bebong Osorio, Francisco Cruz, Rosita Noble, Dory Lorenzana, Anita Soler, Ben Macam, Lito Anzures, Maria Clara Ruiz	Premiere Productions	Action; Drama	
Taimtim Na Dalangin	Ding M. de Jesus	Norma Blancaflor, Eduardo del Mar, Baby Linda Santos, Luis Vizconde, Dony Palacio, Jose Cris Soto	Atheca Productions	Drama	
Talisman	Enrique Jarlego	Armando Goyena, Tessie Quintana, Tony Santos, Frankie Gordon, Eusebio Gomez, Gil de Leon, Nela Alvarez, Elena Acosta, Miniong Alvarez	LVN Pictures	Action, Drama	
Tatlong Patak Ng Luha	Lorenzo P. Tuells	Rita Amor, Africa de la Rosa, Leopoldo Salcedo	Lebran Productions	Drama	
The Trial Of Rizal			Dela Paz Productions, Federal Films	Drama	
Tres Muskiteros	Nardo Vercudia	Oscar Moreno, Fred Montilla, Cesar Ramirez, Teresita Martinez, Norma Vales, Myrna Delgado, Carmencita Abad, Van de Leon, Aruray, Pacita del Rio, Rebecca del Río, Gloria Romero, Africa de la Rosa	Sampaguita Pictures	Action, Drama	
Venus	F.H. Constantino (as Felicing Constantino)	Lilia Dizon, Teody Belarmino, Nida Blanca, Alfonso Carvajal	LVN Pictures	Comedy	
Walang Gulat		Linda Estrella	Sampaguita Pictures	Romance	
Walang Kapantay	Fernando Poe	Carmen Rosales, Jose Padilla Jr., Mila Nimfa, Cristina Aragon, Elena Mayo, Zony Quizon	Royal Productions	Drama	
Yolanda	Susana C. de Guzman	Celia Flor, Teody Belarmino, Alfonso Carvajal, Lila Luna, Patsy (as Patsy Mateo), Etang Discher, Nenita Vidal, Ven Medina (as Ben Medina) , Nora Linda	LVN Pictures	Musical	Serialized in Liwayway magazine.
1952
2 Sundalong Kanin	F.H. Constantino	Pugo, Togo, Nida Blanca, Nestor de Villa	LVN Pictures	Action, Comedy, War	Last film of Togo. Togo died of a heart attack while filming this movie.
Aklat Ng Buhay	Lamberto V. Avellana	Rosa Rosal, Oscar Keesee, Rosa Aguirre, Enrique Jarlego (as Ike Jarlego), Nora Dy	LVN Pictures	Drama	serialized in Bulaklak Magazine
Ang Limpia Bota (The Bootblack)	T.D. Agcaoili	Ernesto Bohol, Pacita Francisco, Teodoro Kalaw Katigbak, Lilian Laing, Fidel Sicam, Josefina Leano, Vicky Castillo, Ruben Lacsamana, Mike Melo, Neonora Ruiz, Ric Valdez, Judge Bienvenido Tan, Governor Lino Castillejo, Fiscal Nicanor Nicolas, Professor Vincent Quimbo	Far East Films	Drama	
Ang Pagsilang Ng Mesiyas	Carlos Vander Tolosa	Norma Blancaflor, Tirso Cruz III, Reynaldo Dante, Rosita Noble, Oscar Keesee, Eddie Infante, Tita Muñoz, Rolando Liwanag, Andres Iturbi	Lebran Productions	Drama, Religious	
Ang Sawa Sa Lumang Simboryo	Gerardo de Leon	Jose Padilla Jr., Anita Linda, Tony Tolman, Ding Tello, Pancho Pelagio, Max Alvarado, Rita Gomez, Nello Nayo, Boy Francisco, Corazon Rivas, Lauro Delgado, Jose Romulo, Vicente Liwanag, Lito Anzures, Francisco Cruz, Elvie Calderon, Andres Benitez, Bruno Punzalan, Kulafu, Bino Garcia, Kasupang, Fred Ramirez, Jose Lapid, Angela Enriquez	Manuel Vistan Jr. Production (as M.V. Jr. Production) , Premiere Productions	Action, Drama, Romance	This is Filipino Academy of Motion Picture Arts and Sciences (FAMAS) first Best Picture in 1952. Written by Amado Yasona and serialized in Mabuhay Komiks in 1950. The movie was supposed to be the sole entry of Premiere Productions to the Famas derby but the studio was gripped with labor problems which had reached the courts. A court ruling temporarily prevented Premiere from making any pictures so M.J. Vistan Productions took over the completion of the movie. Rita Gomez was supposed to appear in a very small part in the movie, but director Gerardo de Leon was impressed with her acting. He extended Gomez's part, enabling her to clinch a best supporting actress nomination. Lauro Delgado and Jose Romulo were introduced in the film.
Ang Bagong Umaga	Gerardo de Leon	Ben Perez	Premiere Productions	Drama	
Awa Ng Birhen Sa Baclaran		Ramon d'Salva, Eddie del Mar, Arsenia Francisco, Patria Plata, Nati Rubi		Drama	
Babaeng Hampaslupa		Nida Blanca, Africa de la Rosa, Rogelio de la Rosa	LVN Pictures	Drama, Romance	
Balud			Visayan Films	Drama	
Barbaro	Eddie Romero (as Enrique Moreno)	Pancho Magalona, Tita Duran, Tessie Martinez, Bert Olivar, Tony Cayado, Jose de Villa, Chichay, Pedro Faustino, Totoy Torrente, Martin Marfil, Olive La Torre	Sampaguita Pictures	Action	serialized in Pilipino Komiks film with a thousand casts
Basahang Ginto	Mar S. Torres	Pancho Magalona, Alicia Vergel, Myrna Delgado, Aruray, Tony Cayado, Jose de Villa, Aring Bautista, Horacio Morelos, Maria Ballesteros, Dolores Criscini, Jose Salameda, Eddie Garcia, Herminia Carranza, Fidela Magpayo	Sampaguita Pictures	Drama	serialized in Hiwaga Komiks remade as television drama series Basahang Ginto (2010)
Bathaluman	Enrique Jarlego	Lilia Dizon, Mario Montenegro, Evelyn Villar, Eusebio Gomez, Oscar Keesee, Joseph de Cordova (as Jose de Cordova) , Victor Blanco, Nela Alvarez	LVN Pictures	Drama, Sci-fi	serialized in Bulaklak Magazine
Bohemyo	Gregorio Fernandez (as Dr. Gregorio M. Fernandez)	Delia Razon, Mario Montenegro, Merly Fernandez, Letty Alonzo, Gil de Leon, Naty Bernardo, Eliseo Carvajal, Patsy, Etang Discher, Cita Javellana, Vicky Santos, Miniong Alvarez, Juanita Rodriguez, Jose Cris Soto	LVN Pictures	Drama	
Buhay Pilipino	Olive La Torre	Tita Duran, Pancho Magalona, Rudy Francisco, Chichay, Tolindoy, Aruray, Sylvia La Torre, Horacio Morelos, Leonora Ruiz	Sampaguita Pictures	Musical	serialized in Liwayway magazine supported by an all-star cast
Buhay Alamang (Paglukso'y Patay)	Eddie Romero (as Enrique Moreno)	Fred Montilla, Anita Linda, Mona Lisa, Tito Arevalo, Arsenia Francisco	Lebran Productions	Drama	
Bulaklak Ng Nayon		Nena Cardenas, Anita Linda, Paco Zamora	Royal Productions	Drama	
Correccional	Susana C. de Guzman	Celia Flor, Mario Montenegro, Rosa Rosal, Tony Arnaldo, Maria Cristina, Patsy, Ana Serrano, Minda Miranda	LVN Pictures	Crime, Drama, Musical, Romance	
Cumbanchera		Tessie Agana, Katy de la Cruz, Tita Duran	Sampaguita Pictures	Musical	based on a comics series written by Mars Ravelo
Darna At Ang Babaeng Lawin	Carlos Vander Tolosa	Rosa del Rosario, Elvira Reyes, Ben Rubio, Mila Nimfa, Manuel Ubaldo, Andres Benitez, Rafael Jimenez, Zony Quizon, Africa de la Rosa, Corazon Rivas, Santos Gallardo	Royal Productions	Action, Fantasy	serialized in Pilipino Komiks and written by Mars Ravelo
Digmaan Ng Damdamin	Artemio Marquez	Delia Razon, Jaime de la Rosa, Nida Blanca, Alfonso Carvajal, Carlos Salazar, Elena Acosta, Cita Javellana, Armando Araneta, Victor Blanco	LVN Pictures	Drama, Romance, War	serialized in DZBC Radio
Dimas: The Sainted Robber	Nemesio E. Caravana	Rogelio de la Rosa, Lilia Dizon, Rosa Rosal, Alfonso Carvajal, Nestor de Villa, Jose Corazon de Jesus	LVN Pictures	Action, Adventure, Fantasy	serialized in Liwayway magazine
Espada		Cesar Ramirez		Action	
Evening Of Happiness				Drama, Romance	
Golem		Tessie San Juan, Ramon d'Salva	Royal Productions	Action	
Harana Sa Karagatan	Jose Climaco	Armando Goyena, Delia Razon, Lila Luna, Enrique Jarlego (aka Enrique "Ike" Jarlego Jr.), Naty Bernardo, Maria Cristina, Eusebio Gomez, Amado Cortez, Jose Climaco, Mario Roldan, Miniong Alvarez, Mila del Sol	LVN Pictures	Action, Drama	
Haring Solomon at Reyna Sheba	Lamberto V. Avellana	Mila del Sol, Jaime de la Rosa, Nida Blanca, Nestor de Villa, Tony Santos, Johnny Reyes, Elena Acosta, Ben Medina, Joseph de Cordova (as Jose de Cordova), Arturo Moran, Mario Roldan, Edna Luna	LVN Pictures	Drama	published in Liwayway magazine and dramatized over DZBC Radio
Hawayana	Manuel Silos	Armando Goyena, Tessie Quintana, Joseph de Cordova (as Jose de Cordova), Jose Cris Soto, Angge, Frank Gordon, Casmot, Arturo Moran, Tony Dantes, Sim Pajarillo, Vic Cabrera, Jerry de los Reyes, Buen Lumba, Basilio Serdon, Jorge David, Eddie Cascante, Jenny Rubin	LVN Pictures	Drama, Romance	serialized in Mabuhay Komiks
Hihintayin Kita	Artemio B. Tecson	Oscar Moreno, Linda Estrella, Norma Vales, Pacita Francisco, Totoy Torrente, Pedro Faustino, Pablo Raymundo, Aring Bautista, Dolores Crescini, Mely Lim, Dely Magpayo, Pepe Salameda	Sampaguita Pictures	Drama, Musical, Romance	serialized in Bulaklak Magazine
Hiram na Mukha	Nardo Vercudia	Fred Montilla, Alicia Vergel, Bert Olivar, Pedro Faustino, Rebecca del Río, Horacio Morelos, Eddie Garcia, Maria Ballesteros, Linda Estrella	Sampaguita Pictures	Drama, Fantasy	serialized in Bulaklak Magazine
Inahan		Fred Montecillo, Virgie Postigo, Cora Real			
Isabelita		Armando Goyena, Tessie Quintana, Priscilla Cellona, Alfonso Carvajal, Milagros Naval, Mat Ranillo Jr. (as Mat Ranillo)	LVN Pictures	Drama, Musical	
Kalbaryo Ni Hesus	Carlos Vander Tolosa	Jennings Sturgeon, Norma Blancaflor, Elvira Reyes, Carol Varga, Fernando Royo, Ben Rubio, Juan Monteiro, Teddy Benavidez, Africa de la Rosa, Lupe Velasco, Sweet Williams, Andres Centenera, Cecilio Joaquin, Ramon D'Salva, Rita Rivera, Bert Olivar, Don Bernardo Castell, Don Danon, Manuel Barbeyto, Oscar Keesee, Ric Bustamante	Lebran Productions	Drama, Religious	first Filipino screen adaptation on the life, death and resurrection of Jesus
Kambal Tuko	F.H. Constantino	Pugo, Togo, Gil de Leon, Carmencita Palma, Eddie San Jose, Inday Jalandoni, Joseph de Cordova, Chuchi, Ramon Monroy, Berting Liwanag, Henry Dayo, Pamboy	LVN Pictures	Comedy	First Filipino comedy film to feature the medical condition conjoined twins
Kasaysayan Ni Rudy Concepcion	Octavio Silos	Pancho Magalona, Linda Estrella, Myrna Delgado, Tita Muñoz, Tolindoy, Tony Cayado, Jose de Villa	Sampaguita Pictures	Biopic, Drama	
Kerubin	Octavio Silos	Tessie Agana, Linda Estrella, Chichay, Bella Flores, Van de Leon, Tolindoy, Jose de Villa, Rebecca Gonzales	Sampaguita Pictures	Fantasy	serialized in Liwayway Magazine
Korea	Lamberto V. Avellana	Jaime de la Rosa, Tony Santos, Alfonso Carvajal, Gil de Leon, Johnny Reyes, Oscar Obligacion, Arturo Moran, Leroy Salvador, Miguel Lopez, Mario Roldan, Milagros Naval, Nida Blanca	LVN Pictures	Drama, War	In response to the effort of the Philippine government against the spread of communism in the country, LVN Pictures produced three anti-communist films. This is the second film. The others were Kontrabando (1950) and Huk sa bagong pamumuhay (1953).
Kuwentong Kutsero	Narciso Pimentel Jr.	Oscar del Rosario	Dramatic Philippines	Comedy	
Lihim Ng Kumpisalan	Olive La Torre	Pancho Magalona, Linda Estrella, Rudy Francisco, Jose de Villa, Pedro Faustino, Tolindoy	Sampaguita Pictures	Drama, Suspense	
Luha Ng Langit		Anita Linda	Premiere Productions	Drama	
Madam X	Artemio B. Tecson	Alicia Vergel, Cesar Ramirez, Gloria Romero, Chichay, Tolindoy, Tony Cayado, Jose de Villa, Pedro Faustino, Aring Bautista, Precy Ortega	Sampaguita Pictures	Drama, Suspense	serialized in Bulaklak Magazine
Malolos	Consuelo P. Osorio	Nena Cardenas, Eddie del Mar, Lopito, Oscar Keesee, Arturo Lerma, Ruben Rustia, Rosita Noble, Amelita Sol, Dolly Garcia, Luis San Juan, Nello Nayo, Francisco Cruz, Lito Anzures, Zaldy Zschornack	Premiere Productions	Action, Romance	
Matador		Rosa Aguirre, Oscar del Rosario	LVN Pictures	Suspense	
Mayamang Balo		Rebecca del Río, Linda Estrella, Pedro Faustino, Tessie Martinez, Fred Montilla, Tolindoy	Sampaguita Pictures	Comedy	
Mga Bituin Ng Kinabukasan	Jose Nepomuceno	Lani O. Padilla, Roberto Rico, Pura Flor, Ike Lozada, Susan Roces	Lebran Productions, Nepomuceno Productions	Comedy, Drama	film debut of Susan Roces
Mona Lisa		Lydia Montañez, Manolo Valdez, Paco Zamora	Royal Productions	Drama	
Monghita	Artemio Marquez	Oscar Moreno, Gloria Romero, Norma Vales, Van de Leon, Jose de Villa, Horacio Morelos, Justina David, Myrna Delgado, Ricardo Mirasol, Belen Velasco, Mila Yumul, Pablo Raymundo, Ray Bautista, Jose Salameda	Sampaguita Pictures	Drama	dramatized over DZBC Radio
Nabanhaw		Mary Miraflor, Luis Mercado		Fantasy	
Neneng Ko		Rosa del Rosario, Leopoldo Salcedo	Lebran Productions	Drama	
Ngipin Sa Ngipin		Anita Linda	Maria Clara Pictures, Royal Productions	Comedy	
Nicomedes	Artemio Marquez	Efren Reyes, Oscar Keesee, Fernando Royo, Bebong Osorio, Jose Santiago, Luis San Juan, Luis Vizconde, Dely Atay-atayan, Bruno Punzalan, Lito Anzures, Dory Lorenzana, Lory Gemora	People's Pictures, Premiere Productions	Drama	
Og	Cesar Gallardo	Jess Ramos (as Jesus Ramos), Leila Morena, Lopito, Oscar Keesee, Boy Francisco, Francisco Cruz, Amelita Sol	Premiere Productions	Action, Adventure	
Palasig	Artemio B. Tecson	Cesar Ramirez, Gloria Romero, Aruray, Tony Cayado, Totoy Torrente, Pedro Faustino, Dolores Crescini	Sampaguita Pictures	Adventure, Drama, Fantasy	serialized in Liwayway Magazine
Pedro, Pablo, Juan at Jose		Rosa Aguirre, Manuel Barbeyto, Teddy Benavidez (as Teddy Benavides), Don Dano, Eddie del Mar	Luis F. Nolasco Productions	Comedy	
Raul Roldan	Billy Icasiano	Leila Morena, Efren Reyes, Fernando Royo, Patria Plata, Luis San Juan, Riño Isa, Lita Soriano, Nello Nayo, Guillermo Carls, Lourdes Galicia, Antonio Hernandez, Emma Ledesma, Evangeline Sayson, Ben Jaro	Premiere Productions	Action, Adventure, Drama, Romance	serialized in Hiwaga Komiks
Rebecca	Olive La Torre	Tessie Agana, Tessie Martinez, Van de Leon, Rosa Mia, Gloria Romero, Bella Flores, Boy Alano, Etang Discher, Chichay, Tolindoy	Sampaguita Pictures	Drama	serialized in Tagalog Klasiks
Rita Rits	Consuelo P. Osorio	Helen Grace Prospero (as Helengrace Prospero), Tessie San Juan, Amado Cortez, Leonora Ruiz, Antonio Moguies, Benny Mack, Tony Osorio, Baby Corazon, Virgie Calasanz, Dory Corpuz, Luis San Juan	People's Pictures	Comedy	serialized in Bulaklak Magazine
Rodrigo de Villa	Gregorio Fernandez	Delia Razon, Mario Montenegro, Alfonso Carvajal, Oscar Keesee, Nestor de Villa, Jose Vergara, Enrique Jarlego, Naty Bernardo, Victor Blanco, Letty Alonzo, V. Sanyos, Elena Acosta, Lourdes Yumul, Mario Roldan, Luz Fernandez, Carlos Salazar(Introducing)	LVN Pictures	Action, Adventure	serialized in Liwayway Magazine
Romansa sa Nayon	Susana C. de Guzman	Nida Blanca, Rogelio de la Rosa, Nestor de Villa, Mila del Sol, Mila Ocampo	LVN Pictures	Drama, Romance	
Ronquillo	Lamberto V. Avellana	Don Dano, Leila Morena, Jose Padilla Jr.	Luis F. Nolasco Production	Action	
Sa Paanan Ng Nazareno	Lamberto V. Avellana	Rino Bermudez, Jaime de la Rosa, Gregorio Ticman	LVN Pictures	Drama	
Sabas, ang barbaro	Eddie Romero (as Enrique Moreno)	Tita Duran, Pancho Magalona, Tessie Martinez	Sampaguita Pictures	Drama, Period	
Salome		Ramon d'Salva	Consuelo Productions	Drama	
Sandino	Eduardo de Castro	Danilo Montes, Ester Buenaobra, Patria Plata, Rafael Jimenez, Max Alvarado, Francisco Cruz, Rolando Liwanag	Manuel Vistan Jr. Production	Horror	serialized in Manila Klasiks
Sangang Nangabali		Bert Nombrado, Mat Ranillo Jr., Gloria Sevilla	Visayan Films	Drama	
Saykopatik	F.H. Constantino	Pugo, Togo, Tony Santos, Priscilla Cellona	LVN Pictures	Comedy	
Siklab Sa Batangas	Nardo Vercudia	Fred Montilla, Gloria Romero, Van de Leon, Ven Medina, Bella Flores, Tony Cayado, Martin Marfil, Justina David, Totoy Torrente, Armando Garces, Aring Bautista, Horacio Morelos, Ramon Revilla, Nardo Vercudia, Maria Ballesteros, Cesar Ramirez	Sampaguita Pictures	Action, Drama, War	serialized in Bulaklak Magazine and dramatized over DZBC Radio
Tahas			Visayan Films	Drama	
Taong Paniki	Richard Abelardo	Jaime de la Rosa, Delia Razon, Alfonso Carvajal, Rosa Aguirre, Gil de Leon, Maria Cristina, Frank Gordon, Miguel Lopez, Maria Norma Mendoza, Arturo Moran	LVN Pictures	Horror	dramatized over DZPI radio
Tatlong Birhen		Teddy Benavidez (as Teddy Benavides)		Drama	
Tatlong Kabanata Sa Buhay Ko	Eddie Infante	Anita Linda, Danilo Montes, Patria Plata, Amfaro Karagdag, Lopito, Ruben Rustia, Pancho Pelagio	Premiere Productions	Drama	
Texas (Ang Manok Na Nagsasalita)	Armando Garces	Texas the Chicken, Pancho Magalona, Linda Estrella, Myrna Delgado, Katy de la Cruz, Tita Muñoz, Gregorio Ticman, Tolindoy	Sampaguita Pictures	Fantasy	First Filipino film to feature an animal as the lead title character. Serialized in Pilipino Komiks.
Tenyente Carlos Blanco	Tony Arnaldo	Armando Goyena, Tessie Agana, Nida Blanca, Nestor de Villa, Tessie Quintana	LVN Pictures	Action, Drama	
Tiya Loleng	Manuel Silos	Armando Goyena, Tessie Agana, Tessie Quintana, Nida Blanca, Lila Luna, Frank Gordon, Rosa Aguirre, Amado Cortez, Arturo Moran, Etang Discher, Miguel Lopez, Tony Dantes, J. Rodriguez, Carlos Salazar	LVN Pictures	Comedy	
Trubador	Cesar Gallardo	Eddie del Mar, Leila Morena, Lopito, Ester Buenaobra, Tony Tolman, Leonora Ruiz, Francisco Cruz, Isa Riño, Bruno Punzalan, Nello Nayo, Bino Garcia, Lito Anzures, Pempling Maximo	Premiere Productions	Action, Fantasy	
Tulisang Pugot	Octavio Silos	Fred Montilla, Myrna Delgado, Tita Muñoz, Chichay, Tolindoy, Bert Olivar, Jose de Villa, Pedro Faustino, Horacio Morelos,	Sampaguita Pictures	Action, Adventure, Fantasy	serialized in Liwayway Magazine
Tungkod Ni Moises	Manuel Silos	Armando Goyena, Evelyn Villar, Oscar Obligacion, Elena Acosta, Mario Roldan, Tony Dantes, Pepita Gonzales, Anita Serrano, Pamboy, Carlos Rufo	LVN Pictures	Drama	serialized in Liwayway Magazine
Ulila Ng Bataan	Armando Garces	Tessie Agana, Mona Lisa, Sylvia La Torre, Boy Alano, Ramon Revilla, Precy Ortega, Totoy Torrente, Martin Marfil, Jose de Villa, Ven Medina, Olive La Torre, Batotoy, Aring Bautista, Horacio Morelos, Jose Salameda, Ric Flores	Sampaguita Pictures	Action, Drama	
1953
Agilang Itim	Teodorico C. Santos	Eddie del Mar, Anita Linda, Fernando Royo, Oscar Keesee, Patria Plata, Elena Mayo, Johnny Monteiro, Rita Gomez, Ruben Rustia, Tony Tolman, Maria Norma Mendoza, Mario Barri, Nello Nayo, Edna Luna, Boy Francisco,	People's Pictures; Premiere Productions	Adventure; Fantasy	serialized in Liwayway magazine
Ang Asawa Kong Americana	Enrique Moreno	Oscar Moreno, Joan Page, Rudy Francisco, Chichay, Tolindoy, Sylvia La Torre, Boy Alano, Bella Flores, Aring Bautista, Horacio Morelos, Marcela Garcia, Herminia Carranza, Eddie Garcia, Apolonia Aguilar	Sampaguita Pictures	Comedy; Romance	
Ang Ating Pag-ibig		Pancho Magalona, Tita Duran, Norma Vales, Rebecca del Río, Chichay, Lolita Rodriguez (as Lolita Marquez)	Sampaguita Pictures	Drama	
Ang Bagong Maestra	Gerardo de Leon	Ben Perez, Erlinda Cortes, Baby Zobel, Vicente Liwanag, Ruben Rustia, Pedro Faustino, Justina David	Royal Productions	Drama	
Apat Na Taga		Gloria Romero, Ric Rodrigo, Lolita Rodriguez, Rosemarie Sonora, Pepito Rodriguez, Conrado Conde, Katy de la Cruz, Van de Leon	Sampaguita Pictures	Drama	
Babaing Kalbo	Fermin Barva	Nela Alvarez, Romy Brion, Ramon d'Salva, Victor Sevilla	Lebran Productions	Comedy	
Banga Ni Zimadar	Gerardo de Leon	Efren Reyes, Edna Luna, Gloria Sevilla, Carol Varga	Manuel Vistan Jr. Productions; Premiere Productions	Fantasy	
Batangueña	F.H. Constantino	Jaime de la Rosa, Nida Blanca, Lou Salvador, Letty Alonzo, Chito Navarro, Cecilia Lopez, Nora Dy, Ike Jarlego Jr., Lourdes Yumul, Tony Dantes, Levi Celerio	LVN Pictures	Comedy	serialized in Bulaklak Magazine
Blood of Bataan		Leopoldo Salcedo, Fernando Royo, Guillermo Carls, George Carlyle, Vidal Escudal, Mona Lisa, Ding Tello, Totoy Torrente		Drama; War	
Carlos Trece	Nemesio E. Caravana	Efren Reyes, Anita Linda, Johnny Monteiro, Amado Cortez	Premiere Productions	Adventure; Swashbuckler film	serialized in Liwayway magazine
Carmen	Palito	Gloria Sevilla	Visayan Films	Drama	
Cofradia (Ang Mahiwagang Sinderela)	Artemio B. Tecson	Gloria Romero, Ramon Revilla, Chichay, Tony Cayado, Rebecca del Río, Priscilla Concepcion, Precy Ortega, Aring Bautista, Tolindoy, Lolita Rodriguez	Sampaguita Pictures	Drama	originally written for comics by Dominador Ad. Castillo and serialized in Mabuhay Komiks
Dagohoy	Dr. Gregorio Fernandez	Mario Montenegro, Tessie Quintana, Rosa Rosal, Tony Santos, Alfonso Carvajal, Gil de Leon, Joseph de Cordova, Ven Medina, Frank Gordon, Jose Vergara, Leroy Salvador, Arturo Moran, Natoy B. Catindig, Mario Roldan, Casmot, Sim Pajarillo (as Simplicio Pajarillo), Mario Taquibulos, Ezar Visenio, Nora Dy, Antonio Medina, Lorna Mirasol	LVN Pictures	Biopic; Historical	based on the life of the country's hero Francisco Dagohoy dramatized over DZPI Radio; in Ansco Color
Dalagang Nayon		Tessie Quintana, Carlos Salazar	LVN Pictures	Comedy, Romance	
Dalawang Pag-ibig	Joe Climaco	Delia Razon, Nestor de Villa, Priscilla Cellona, Johnny Reyes, Elena Acosta, Frank Gordon, Leroy Salvador, Priscilla Ramirez, Ramon Monroy	LVN Pictures	Musical; Romance	dramatized over DZBC Radio
Diwani	Nardo Vercudia	Alicia Vergel, Cesar Ramirez, Eddie Garcia, Bella Flores, Precy Ortega, Martin Marfil, Eddie Arenas, Pedro Faustino	Sampaguita Pictures	Adventure	serialized in Hiwaga Komiks
Dyesebel	Gerardo de Leon	Edna Luna, Jaime de la Rosa, Carol Varga, Fernando Royo, Etang Discher	Manuel Vistan Jr. Production; Premiere Productions	Fantasy; Romance	the original screen adaptation of the popular Mars Ravelo comics first serialized in Pilipino Komiks in 1952 and was made into a film in 1953.
El Indio	Enrique Moreno	Cesar Ramirez, Nena Cardenas, Van de Leon, Boy Alano, Tita Muñoz, Tony Cayado, Myrna Delgado, Bert Olivar, Martin Marfil, Totoy Torrente, Eddie Garcia, Olive La Torre, Conrado Conde, Ely Nakpil, Teresita de Alba	Sampaguita Pictures	Action	serialized in Pilipino Komiks and El Indio
Ganyan Lang Ang Buhay	Enrique Jarlego	Priscilla Cellona, Carlos Salazar, Pugo, Jose Cris Soto, Rosa Aguirre, Naty Bernardo, Joseph de Cordova, Nora Dy, Ike Jarlego Jr.	LVN Pictures	Drama	serialized in Bulaklak Magazine
Gorio at Tekla	Olive La Torre	Fred Montilla, Norma Vales, Chichay, Ramon Revilla, Horacio Morelos, Tolindoy	Sampaguita Pictures	Comedy	serialized in Tagalog Klasiks
Habang Buhay	Teodorico C. Santos	Jose Padilla, Nena Cardenas, Carol Varga, Amado Cortez, Nello Nayo, Francisco Cruz, Sonia Reyes, Neonita Bona, Vicente Liwanag, Angelina Razon	Manuel Vistan Jr. Productions; Premiere Productions	Drama, Romance	serialized in Liwayway magazine
Hercules	Writer: Clodualdo del Mundo Sr.	Cesar Ramirez, Gloria Romero	Sampaguita Pictures	Adventure, Fantasy	serialized in Pilipino Komiks
Highway 54	Ben Calasanz	Leopoldo Salcedo, Paraluman, Ben Perez, Carol Varga, Rolando Liwanag, Rosa Aguirre, Miguel Anzures, Romy Brion, Dely Atay-atayan	LVN Pictures	Action	
Hijo de Familia	F.H. Constantino	Nida Blanca, Nestor de Villa	LVN Pictures	Comedy; Romance	
Hiyasmin	Lamberto V. Avellana	Nida Blanca, Nestor de Villa, Tony Santos, Gil de Leon, Johnny Reyes, Arturo Moran, Carmencita Abad, Casmot, Vic Silayan, Priscilla Ramirez	LVN Pictures	Action	serialized in Liwayway magazine
Huk Sa Bagong Pamumuhay	Lamberto V. Avellana	Jose Padilla, Celia Flor, Ven Medina, Rosa Aguirre, Joseph de Cordova, Leroy Salvador, Miguel Lopez, Rolf Bayer, Vic Silayan, Ezar Visenio, Pepita Gonzales, Priscilla Ramirez, Leonardo Fernandez, Danilo Conde, Pacito Ronas	LVN Pictures	Action; Drama	winner of 11 FAMAS Award including Best Picture at the 2nd FAMAS Awards (considered as Philippines' equivalent of Academy Awards) In response to the effort of the Philippine government against the spread of communism in the country, LVN Productions produced three anti-communist film. This is the third film, following Kontrabando (1950) and Korea (1952).
Inspirasiyon	Armando Garces	Carmen Rosales, Norma Vales, Van de Leon, Katy de la Cruz, Rosa Mia, Pedro Faustino, Jose de Villa, Rebecca del Rio, Panchito Alba, Aring Bautista, Horacio Morelos, Pablo Raymundo, Ricardo "Ric" Rodrigo (Introducing)	Sampaguita Pictures	Comedy; Romance	serialized in Tagalog Klasiks
Kambal Na Lihim	Ricardo Brillantes	Leopoldo Salcedo, Jose Padilla Jr., Margaret Merritt, Angela Luna, Carol Varga, Jose Villafranca, Pedro Faustino, Leon Timog, Dely Atay-Atayan, Kasupang (as Casupang)	LGS Production	Action	
Kapitan Berong	Nemesio E. Caravana	Efren Reyes, Rosita Noble, Carol Varga, Oscar Keesee, Amado Cortez	Manuel Vistan Production; Premiere Productions	Adventure; Fantasy	first serialized in Liwayway magazine
Kapitan Kidlat Ngayon!	Oscar del Rosario	Armando Goyena, Evelyn Villar, Milagros Naval, Eusebio Gomez, Jose Vergara, Oscar del Rosario, Miguel Lopez, Menandro Ramos, Alfonso Carvajal, Carmencita Abad, Florentino Garcia, Jose Corazon de Jesus Jr., Arturo Moran, Helen Nazario, Casmot	LVN Pictures	Action; Fantasy	serialized over DZRH Radio
Kiko	Olive La Torre	Boy Alano, Patria Plata, Van de Leon, Rosa Mia, Aruray, Etang Discher, Leonora Ruiz	Sampaguita Pictures	Comedy	
Kuwentong Bahay-bahayan	Manuel Silos	Ronaldo Acuzar, Carmen Bañez, Ruth Blanco, Willy Cruz, Antonio de los Angeles, Nora Dy, Ike Jarlego Jr., Antonio Medina	LVN Pictures	Comedy; Musical	A film where all actors are played by children acting as adults.
Kuwintas Ng Pasakit	Susana C. de Guzman	Lilia Dizon, Mario Montenegro, Rosa Rosal, Johnny Reyes, Victor Blanco, Oscar Obligacion, Frankie Gordon, Pepita Gonzales, Cynthia Gomez, Rebecca Rocha, Miniong Alvarez, Gil de Leon	LVN Pictures	Drama	first dramatized in DZPI Radio
Leilani (Tabu)	Rempo Urip	Netty Herawaty, Rd Mochtar, Sukarsih, Nur Hasanah, Awaludin, A. Hadi, Boes Boestami, Astaman	LVN Pictures, Persari Films	Drama	second collaboration of Filipino and Indonesian film production companies after Rodrigo de Villa (1952)
Loida: Ang Aking Pag-ibig	Lamberto V. Avellana	Jaime de la Rosa, Celia Flor	LVN Pictures	Drama	first dramatized over DZRH Radio
Looban	Ben Calasanz	Leopoldo Salcedo, Anita Linda, Elvira Reyes, Ramon d'Salva, Joe Ramos, Pedro Faustino, Vicenta Fernandez, Ely Nakpil, Batotoy, Chuchi, Ric Valle, Blackie Francisco, Nita Cayetano, Candida Valderrama, Dolores Pobre, Fred Ramirez, Bert Santos, Ruben Reyes, Benny Calasanz	Cinema Technicians Production; Filmakers Production	Romance	first serialized in Hiwaga komiks
Luha At Musika	Tony Arnaldo	Mario Montenegro, Evelyn Villar, Tony Santos, Gil de Leon, Naty Bernardo, Oscar Obligacion, Nora Dy, Arturo Moran, Florentino Ballecer, Casmot, Minda Miranda, Myrna Quizon (Introducing)	LVN Pictures	Drama	serialized in Liwayway magazine
Makabuhay	Tony Arnaldo	Mario Montenegro, Lilia Dizon, Rosa Rosal, Johnny Reyes, Jose Cris Soto, Eusebio Gomez, Priscilla Ramirez, Angge, Anita Linda, Leopoldo Salcedo	LVN Pictures	Drama; Romance	serialized in Liwayway magazine
Malapit Sa Diyos	Fermin Barva	Romy Brion, Reynaldo Dante, Anita Linda, Gregorio Ticman	Lebran	Drama	
Maldita	Enrique Moreno	Pancho Magalona, Rita Gomez, Boy Alano, Tony Cayado, Bella Flores, Aruray, Martin Marfil, Conrado Conde, Horacio Morelos	Sampaguita Pictures	Comedy	serialized in Pilipino Komiks
May Isang Tsuper Ng Taksi	Enrique Moreno	Oscar Moreno, Erlinda Cortes, Oscar Keesee, Conrado Conde, Juan Monteiro, Andres Iturbi, Etang Discher, Norma Buenaobra, Noemi de Leon, Paquito Legaspi, Ric Balmori, Ching Macadasco, Lady	Lebran	Comedy	
May Karapatang Isilang		Rosa del Rosario, Paraluman	Deegar Cinema	Drama	
May Umaga Pang Darating	Consuelo P. Osorio	Carmen Rosales, Gloria Romero, Rudy Francisco, Tony Cayado, Van de Leon, Myrna Delgado, Jose Padilla Jr., Ramon Revilla	Sampaguita Pictures	Drama	serialized in Bulaklak Magazine and Alimyon
Mga Pusong May Lason	Rino Bermudez	Alfonso Carvajal, Mario Montenegro, Delia Razon	LVN Pictures	Drama	directorial debut of Rino Bermudez
Mister Kasintahan	Nardo Vercudia	Gloria Romero, Ramon Revilla, Chichay, Tolindoy, Rebecca del Rio, Precy Ortega, Horacio Morelos	Sampaguita Pictures	Comedy	
Munting Koronel	Octavio Silos	Tessie Agana, Linda Estrella, Van de Leon, Tony Cayado, Boy Alano, Sylvia La Torre, Aruray, Bert Olivar, Pedro Faustino	Sampaguita Pictures	Drama	serialized in Liwayway magazine first Filipino film to have a world premiere at King's Theater in Honolulu, Hawaii, US
Musikong Bumbong	Octavio Silos	Pancho Magalona, Gloria Romero, Boy Alano, Rosa Mia, Rebecca del Rio, Etang Discher, Horacio Morelos	Sampaguita Pictures	Drama	serialized in Bulaklak Magazine and Alimyon
Nenita Unit	Eddie Infante (as Eduardo Infante)	Eddie Infante, Anita Linda, Danilo Montes, Patria Plata	Columbia Pictures	Drama	
Now And Forever	Rolando del Mar	Armi Kuusela, Virgilio Hilario, Oscar Keesee, Ramon Olmos, Benjamin Lagmay, Ricky Blake (Introducing), Cavite Ilano (Introducing), Paraluman, Belle Gonzales, Manolo Valdez, Rita Rivera	Deegar Cinema	Drama; Romance	true to life story of Armi Kuusela and Virgilio Hilario
Pagsikat Ng Araw	Consuelo P. Osorio	Ramon d'Salva, Carlos Padilla Sr., Leopoldo Salcedo	Maria Clara Pictures	Drama	
Philippine Navy	Dr. Gregorio Fernandez	Armando Goyena, Tessie Quintana, Tony Santos, Carlos Salazar, Gil de Leon, Frankie Gordon, Ben Medina, Natoy Katindig, Miniong Alvarez	LVN Pictures	Action	serialized in Bagong Buhay Komiks
Recuerdo	Nardo Vercudia	Fred Montilla, Gloria Romero, Myrna Delgado, Ramon Revilla, Rosa Mia, Eddie Garcia	Sampaguita Pictures	Drama	serialized in Tagalog Klasiks
Reyna Bandida	Artemio B. Tecson	Cesar Ramirez, Rita Gomez, Ric Rodrigo, Gregorio Ticman, Martin Marfil, Eddie Garcia, Conrado Conde, Panchito Alba	Sampaguita Pictures	Action; Drama	serialized in Espesyal Komiks
Rosa Villa		Carmen Rosales	Sampaguita Pictures	Drama	
Sa Hirap At Ginhawa	Consuelo P. Osorio	Jose Padilla Jr., Arsenia Francisco, Carlos Padilla, Oscar Keesee, Patria Plata, Ramon d'Salva, Rosita Noble, Nati Rubi, Dely Atay-Atayan, Antonio de la Moguies, Luis San Juan, Benny Mack, Engracio Ibarra	Maria Clara Pictures	Drama	
Sa Isang Sulyap mo Tita	Armando Garces	Tita Duran, Pancho Magalona, Dolphy, Aruray, Tony Cayado, Jose de Villa, Aring Bautista, Consuelo P. Osorio, Bert Guinto, Eddie Garcia, Bert Olivar, Ricardo Mirasol, Artemio B. Tecson, Pepe Salameda, Art Osbingkaya	Sampaguita Pictures	Musical	introducing the Magalona real life couple Pancho Magalona and Tita Duran dancing the "MAMBO BARRANCO"
Sa Kamay Ng Tadhana		Eddie del Mar	Larry Santiago Productions	Drama	
Sa Paanan ng Bundok	Susana C. de Guzman	Rogelio de la Rosa, Lilia Dizon, Rosa Aguirre, Joseph de Cordova, Maria Norma Mendoza, Jose Cris Soto, Frank Gordon, Victor Blanco, Angge, Ike Jarlego Jr. Cecilia Lopez	LVN Pictures	Romance	serialized in Liwayway magazine
Señorito	Manuel Conde; Vicente Nayve	Letty Alonzo, Florentino Ballecer, Manuel Conde	LVN Pictures	Comedy	
Siga siga		Anita Linda	Balatbat Productions; Flores Productions	Comedy	
Solitaryo	Cesar Gallardo	Efren Reyes, Nena Cardenas, Johnny Monteiro (as Juan Monteiro), Rosita Noble, Ruben Rustia, Lydia Resma, Ding Tello, Jaime Castellvi, Tony Tolman, Enteng Taba, Lito Anzures, Fernando Santiago, Purita Alma, Boy Francisco, Baby Corazon, Hector Reyes	People's Pictures	Action; Adventure; Fantasy; Swashbuckler	serialized in Espesyal Komiks
Squatters	Gregorio Fernandez	Nida Blanca, Nestor de Villa, Tony Santos, Alfonso Carvajal, Gil de Leon, Johnny Reyes, Elena Acosta, Letty Alonzo, Ester Bautista, Natoy Katindig, Miniong Alvarez, Antonio Medina	LVN Pictures	Comedy; Romance	serialized over DZFM Radio
Tampalasan	Leopoldo Salcedo	Leopoldo Salcedo, Leticia Ojera, Eleanor Medina, Joe Ramos, Oscar Keesee, Don Dano, Pedro Faustino, Romy Brion, Dely Atay-Atayan	LGS Productions	Action; Drama; Fantasy	
Tatlong Labuyo	Richard Abelardo	Delia Razon, Mario Montenegro, Tony Santos, Alfonso Carvajal, Casmot, Letty Alonso, Jose Corazon de Jesus, Miguel Lopez, Nela Alvarez	LVN Pictures	Adventure; Romance	
Tianak		Nena Cardenas, Ramon d'Salva, Rosa del Rosario, Pedro Faustino	Cinema Technician	Horror	
Tinig Ng Tagumpay	Enrique H. Davila	Leopoldo Salcedo, Erlinda Cortes, Lopito, Gregorio Ticman, Nati Rubi, Africa de la Rosa, Salvador Zaragoza, Ester Bautista, Don David, Teresita de Alba, Jose Luis Medina	Lebran Productions	Musical	Don David singing "Martha," "Ang Rosas," "Pag-Ibig," "Tanging Ikaw," Adio A La Vita," "La Donna E Mobile," "Awit Ng Pagsuyo," "Una Fertiva Lagrima," and "Huwag Malulungkot."; Teresita de Alba singing "Amistad" and Jose Luis Madina singing "The Clown Song" from "I Pagliaci"
Tumbalik Na Daigdig	Tony Arnaldo	Nida Blanca, Nestor de Villa, Pugo	LVN Pictures	Comedy	
Vod-A-Vil	Olive La Torre	Tita Duran, Pancho Magalona, Katy de la Cruz, Rosa Mia, Dolphy, Rebecca del Rio, Pedro Faustino, Jose de Villa, Bert Olivar, Priscilla Concepcion, Horacio Morelos, Armando Villamor, Pablo Raymundo, Bayani, Tolindoy	Sampaguita Pictures	Musical	serialized in Hiwaga Komiks
Walang Hanggan		Leopoldo Salcedo, Erlinda Cortes, Ben Perez, Africa de la Rosa	Lebran Productions	Drama; Romance	
1954
3 Sisters	Cesar Gallardo	Nena Cardenas, Rosita Noble, Corazon Rivas, Lauro Delgado, Ruben Rustia, Boy Francisco, Naty Bernardo, Nello Nayo, Lito Anzures, Paquito Salcedo, Zeny Zabala, Lourdes Galicia	Premiere Productions	Drama	serialized in Pilipino Komiks
12 Pares	Lou Salvador	Jaime de la Rosa, Lilia Dizon, Delia Razon, Mario Montenegro, Miniong Alvarez, Florentino Ballecer, Alfonso Carvajal, Joseph de Cordova, Jose Corazon de Jesus Jr., Pedro Faustino, Jose Vergara, Pianing Vidal	LVN Pictures	Adventure; Drama; Fantasy	Brilliantly supported by and all-star cast and thousand of extras. Serialized over DZPI Radio.
Abarinding	Joe Climaco	Tessie Quintana, Carlos Salazar, Alfonso Carvajal, Carmencita Abad, Nora Dy, Oscar Obligacion, Juanita Rodriguez, Tony Santos	LVN Pictures	Musical	Serialized over DZBC Radio.
Abenturera	Nemesio E. Caravana	Efren Reyes, Corazon Rivas, Carol Varga, Jose Romulo, Ruben Rustia, Paco Zamora, Angelito Anzures, Fely Imperial, Paquito Salcedo	People's Pictures; Premiere Productions	Comedy	serialized in Liwayway magazine
Agua Bendita	Paquito Bolero	Pedro Faustino, Danilo Montes, Rosita Noble, Ludy Carmona, Roberto Rosales, Engracio Ibarra, Estrella Noche, Vilma Herrera, Manuel Barbeyto, Antonio de la Moguies, Berto, Tibo, Lolita Bituin (Introducing), Danny Roxas (Introducing)	FDR Productions	Drama	
Anak Ng Espada	Tony Cayado	Tessie Agana, Norma Vales, Rita Gomez, Ric Rodrigo, Van de Leon, Boy Alano, Aruray, Rebecca del Rio, Dalisay Moreno, Jose de Villa, Panchito Alba, Tony Dungan, Eddie Garcia, Armando La Torre, Herminia Carranza, Conchita Carreon	Sampaguita Pictures	Action, Adventure, Fantasy, Swashbuckler	serialized in Bulaklak Magazine
Anak Sa Panalangin	Octavio Silos	Gloria Romero, Ramon Revilla, Chichay, Tolindoy, Rosa Mia, Panchito Alba, Eddie Garcia, Tita de Villa	Sampaguita Pictures	Drama	serialized in Alimyon and Bulaklak Magazine and dramatized over DZRH Radio
Ander di Saya	Nemesio E. Caravana	Leila Morena, Efren Reyes, Lopito, Ramon d'Salva, Francisco Cruz, Dadang Ortega, Paquito Salcedo, Felisa Salcedo, Baby Zobel, Ben Balatbat	Larry Santiago Productions, Premiere Productions	Comedy	serialized in Liwayway Magazine
Ang Biyenang Hindi Tumatawa	Armando Garces	Gloria Romero, Ric Rodrigo, Chichay, Tolindoy, Etang Discher, Aruray, Bella Flores, Martin Marfil, Precy Ortega, Imelda Concepcion, Leonora Ruiz, Emma Aquino, Marcela Garcia, Apolonia Aguilar, Nila Capistrano	Sampaguita Pictures	Comedy, Romance	film debut of Imelda Concepcion
Ang Manyika Ng Sta. Monica	Maggie Geronimo	Angel Esmeralda, Ester Montesa, Tito Arevalo, Teresa Lustre, Rebecca Sales, Ludy Carmona	Palanca Brothers Productions	Drama	serialized in Bulaklak Komiks
Aristokrata	Olive La Torre	Rogelio de la Rosa, Alicia Vergel, Aruray, Panchito Alba, Eddie Garcia, Etang Discher, Bet Olivar	Sampaguita Pictures	Action	serialized in Liwayway Magazine
At Sa Wakas	Artemio Marquez	Leopoldo Salcedo, Tessie Agana, Linda Estrella, Joe Sison (Introducing)	Alta Pictures	Drama	
Bandolero	Jose Velasco	Anita Linda, Eddie del Mar, Elvira Reyes, Ding Tello, Ching Tello, Resty Sandel, Leonora Ruiz, Al Johnson, Godofredo Herrera, Bruno Punzalan, Filipina Tatlonghari(Introducing)	Superior Productions	Action, Drama	
Basagulera	Nardo Vercudia	Anita Linda, Jose Padilla, Patria Plata, Roberto Dantes, Patsy, Floren de Villa, Silver the Wonder Dog, Justina David, Batotoy, Lourdes Linda, Dennis Roldan, Gregorio Ticman	Everlasting Pictures	Comedy	
Batalyon Pilipino sa Korea	Carlos Vander Tolosa	Jose Padilla Jr., Aida Serna, Resty Sandel, Teresa Lustre, Tito Arevalo, Rosa Aguirre, Virgilio Garcia	Palanca Brothers	War	
Bondying	Armando Garces	Fred Montilla, Lolita Rodriguez, Chichay, Tolindoy, Gregorio Ticman, Rebecca del Río, Eddie Garcia, Jose de Villa, Leonora Ruiz, Teroy de Guzman, Bert Olivar, Elaine Gamboa Cuneta	Sampaguita Pictures	Comedy	original screen adaptation of a popular comic series serialized in Pilipino Komiks
Dakilang Pagpapakasakit	Rino Bermudez	Rogelio de la Rosa, Delia Razon, Rosa Rosal, Joseph de Cordova, Chito Navarro, Oscar Obligacion, Chedeng Bermudez, Gumercindo Buencamino, Cynthia Gomez	LVN Pictures	Drama	serialized over DZRH Radio
Dalagang Ilocana	Olive La Torre	Gloria Romero, Ric Rodrigo, Rudy Francisco, Dolphy, Rebecca del Río, Eddie Garcia, Horacio Morelos, Precy Ortega, Marcela Garcia, Tony Dungan, Herminia Carranza, Conchita Carreon, Mila Yumul, Banding Javier, Felicito Espiritu	Sampaguita Pictures	Comedy, Romance	First FAMAS Best Actress Award for Gloria Romero First comedic role to win a FAMAS acting trophy
Dalaginding	Manuel Silos	Nida Blanca, Armando Goyena, Florentino Ballecer, Monang Carvajal, Maring Paralejas, Tony Dantes, Emma Alegre, Angge	LVN Pictures	Comedy	film debut of Emma Alegre
Dalawang Panata	Billy Icasiano	Jaime de la Rosa, Tessie Quintana, Priscilla Cellona, Carmencita Palma, Oscar Obligacion, Chito Navarro, Miguel Lopez, Roger Nite, Zeny Garcia, Nora Dy, Zenny Baby	LVN Pictures	Drama	serialized over DZRH Radio
Dambanang Putik	Enrique Jarlego	Delia Razon, Mario Montenegro, Milagros Naval, Joseph de Cordova, Emma Alegre, Maring Paralejas, Mario Roldan, Lourdes Yumul	LVN Pictures	Romance	serialized in Hiwaga Komiks
Damong Ligaw	Lamberto V. Avellana	Carmencita Abad, Emma Alegre, Armando Goyena, Tessie Quintana	LVN Pictures	Action	
Donato	Rino Bermudez	Jaime de la Rosa, Lorna Mirasol, Rosa Rosal, Gil de Leon, Milagros Naval, Rino Bermudez	LVN Pictures	Drama	serialized in Liwayway magazine
Dumagit	Armando Garces	Cesar Ramirez, Myrna Delgado, Lolita Rodriguez, Van de Leon, Aruray, Jose de Villa, Martin Marfil, Bella Flores	Sampaguita Pictures	Adventure	Filipino version of Tarzan
Eskandalosa	Eddie Romero	Leopoldo Salcedo, Alicia Vergel, Lucas "Lolo Hugo" Paredes, Etang Discher, Teroy de Guzman	Ace-York Pictures	Comedy	
Galawgaw	F.H. Constantino	Nida Blanca, Jaime de la Rosa, Eddie San Jose, Nita Javier, Pianing Vidal, Priscilla Ramirez, Metring David, Pamboy, Dick Reynolds, Andres Albo, Romeo Serdon, Tony Dantes, Eva Reyes, Rafael Ilambo, Romeo del Rosario, Ligaya del Rosario, Vic Cabrera, Basilio Serdon	LVN Pictures	Comedy	serialized in DZBC Radio
Ginto Sa Lusak	Cesar Gallardo	Jose Padilla Jr., Arsenia Francisco, Amado Cortez, Corazon Rivas, Ruben Rustia	Balatbat-Flores Productions, Premiere Productions	Drama	serialized in Liwayway magazine
Goldiger	Rolando del Mar	Leila Morena, Ben Perez, Eleanor Medina, Ramon d'Salva, Caviteno Ilano, Leonora Ruiz, Romy Brion, Nello Nayo, Metring David, Fernando Santiago, Bella Palma (Introducing)	Deegar Cinema	Drama	serialized in Manila Klasiks
Golpe de Gulat	Eddie Romero	Leopoldo Salcedo, Leila Morena, Pugo, Teroy de Guzman, Tony de la Moguies, Lily Miraflor, Lydia Antonio	Deegar Cinema	Comedy	
Guwapo	Teodorico C. Santos	Anita Linda, Reynaldo Dante, Lopito, Carol Varga, Ramon d'Salva, Vicente Liwanag, Nello Nayo, Angelina Razon, Riño. Isa	Premiere Productions	Drama, Romance	serialized in Hiwaga Komiks
Hiram Na Asawa	Susana C. de Guzman	Mario Montenegro, Carlos Salazar, Lorna Mirasol, Cecilia Lopez, Emma Alegre, Eusebio Gomez, Ludy Carmona, Ramon Monroy	LVN Pictures	Comedy, Romance	serialized in Liwayway Magazine
Hiwaga Sa Balete Drive	Tor Villano	Oscar Moreno, Rosita Noble, Resty Sandel, Pepita Gonzales, Menggay, Ana Maria, Bicho-Buche, Bayani Casimiro, Edgardo Llanes, Mercedes Montes (Introducing)	Palanca Brothers Productions	Horror	
Ifugao	Gerardo de Leon	Efren Reyes, Leila Morena, Johnny Monteiro, Gloria Sevilla, Fernando Royo, Leticia Ojera, Leonora Ruiz, Jennings Sturgeon, Mario Barri	Premiere Productions	Drama	serialized in Hiwaga Komiks picture in ANSCO color
Ikaw Ang Buhay Ko	Billy Icasiano	Rogelio de la Rosa, Lilia Dizon, Nora Dy, Jose Vergara, Zenny Gatmaitan, Pianing Vidal	LVN Pictures	Romance	serialized in DZFM
Ikaw Ang Dahilan	Rino Bermudez	Armando Goyena, Delia Razon, Johnny Reyes, Carmencita Abad, Jose Corazon de Jesus Jr., Chico Novarro, Cora Madrid, Jose Troni, Ched Bermudez, Miniong Alvarez	LVN Pictures	Romance	serialized over DZRH radio
Is My Guy	Ben Calasanz	Eddie del Mar, Rosita Noble, Pugak, Tugak, Pedro Faustino, Ely Nakpil, Martin Marfil, Pamboy, Bino Garcia, Smile Bengco, Blackie Francisco, Rolden Santos, Fernando Mendoza, G. Cruz, Pablo Guevarra, Ding Manalang, Virgilio Garcia (Introducing)	All Star Productions	Comedy	political satire film
Jack and Jill	Mar S. Torres	Lolita Rodriguez, Rogelio de la Rosa, Dolphy, Luciano B. Carlos, Herminia Carranza, Matimtiman Cruz, Teroy de Guzman, Jose de Villa, Etang Discher, Bella Flores, Luis Gonzales, Horacio Morelos, Bruno Punzalan	Sampaguita Pictures	Comedy	first Filipino gay film serialized over DZPI Radio and Tagalog Klasiks
Kandelerong Pilak	Lamberto V. Avellana	Lilia Dizon, Teody Belarmino, Tony Santos, Alfonso Carvajal, Johnny Reyes, Joseph de Cordova, Miguel Lopez, Dan Masinas, Mario Roldan, Miniong Alvarez, Joseph Estrada	LVN Pictures	Action	film debut of Joseph Estrada
Krus Na Bakal	Richard Abelardo	Tessie Quintana, Teody Belarmino, Gil de Leon, Eusebio Gomez, Nela Alvarez, Oscar Obligacion, Miniong Alvarez	LVN Pictures	Romance, Sci-fi, Suspense	dramatized over DZFM Radio
Kung Ako'y Maging Dalaga	Artemio B. Tecson	Tessie Agana, Linda Estrella, Van de Leon, Lucas 'Lolo Hugo' Paredes	Alta Pictures	Drama, Musical	
Kurdapya	Tony Cayado	Gloria Romero, Ramon Revilla, Ric Rodrigo, Dolphy, Aruray, Eddie Garcia, Rebecca del Rio, Etang Discher, Herminia Carranza	Sampaguita Pictures	Comedy	serialized in Tagalog Klasiks comics
Laging May Umaga	Teodorico C. Santos	Nena Cardenas, Danilo Montes, Carol Varga, Ramon d'Salva, Leticia Ojera, Jose Romulo	People's Pictures, Premiere Productions	Drama	serialized in Liwayway magazine
Limang Misteryo		Manuel Barbeyto	Continental Pictures	Drama	
Lourdes		Abraham Cruz, Eddie del Mar, Anita Linda, Zeny Zabala	Balatbat-Flores	Drama	
Luha Ng Birhen	Octavio Silos	Carmen Rosales, Van de Leon, Norma Vales, Luis Gonzales	Sampaguita Pictures	Drama	serialized in Espesyal Komiks and dramatized over DZRH radio
Lourdes		Abraham Cruz, Eddie del Mar, Anita Linda, Zeny Zabala	Balatbat-Flores	Drama	
Luneta	F.H. Constantino	Nida Blanca, Nestor de Villa, Fely Crisostomo, Leroy Salvador	LVN Pictures	Romance	
MN	Mar S. Torres	Carmen Rosales, Alicia Vergel, Oscar Moreno, Cesar Ramirez, Aruray, Panchito, Herminia Carranza, Apolonia Aguilar, Leleng Isla, Nenita Jana, Bert LeRoy Jr., Marcela Garcia, Clara Yumul, Ismael Espinosa, Nita Javier	Sampaguita Pictures	Drama, Romance	serialized in Pilipino Komiks
Maaalaala Mo Kaya?	Mar S. Torres	Carmen Rosales, Rogelio de la Rosa, Patria Plata, Dolphy, Aruray, Rosa Mia, Precy Ortega, Tony Cayado, Jose de Villa, Horacio Morelos, Helen Gamboa, Marcela Garcia, Jose Salameda, Leleng Isla, Herminia Carranza	Sampaguita Pictures	Drama	
Mabangong Kandungan		Monang Carvajal, Tony Dantes, Eusebio Gomez, Carlos Salazar, Pianing Vidal	LVN Pictures	Romance	
Matandang Dalaga	Olive La Torre	Carmen Rosales, Jose Padilla, Ramon Revilla, Myrna Delgado, Aruray, Precy Ortega, Conrado Conde, Etang Discher, Horacio Morelos, Pablo Raymundo, Rosa Mia, Tony Cayado	Sampaguita Pictures	Comedy	
May Bakas Ang Lumipas (Aklat Ng Pag-ibig)	Eddie Romero	Rogelio de la Rosa, Oscar Moreno, Gloria Sevilla, Dely Atay-Atayan, Vita Ortega, Arthur Sison Jr., Jamie Javier, Raul Guerrero	Ace York, Eddie Romero Production	Drama	based on the celebrated PMC-Perla radio serial
Menor de Edad	Mar S. Torres	Pancho Magalona, Myrna Delgado, Dolphy, Rosa Mia, Horacio Morelos, Dalisay Moreno, Imelda Concepcion, Ben Johnston, Herminia Carranza, Eddie Garcia, Panchito, Van de Leon	Sampaguita Pictures	Comedy, Musical	
Milyonarya at Hampaslupa	Nardo Vercudia	Pancho Magalona, Linda Estrella, Rita Gomez, Rosa Mia, Rebecca del Río, Tony Cayado, Eddie Garcia, Zeny Zabala, Imelda Concepcion	Sampaguita Pictures	Drama	film debut of Imelda Concepcion
Mister Dupong (Ang Dakilang Mangingibig)	Leopoldo Salcedo	Leopoldo Salcedo, Gloria Sevilla, Carol Varga, Ramon d'Salva, Rosa Aguirre, Romy Brion, Antonio de la Moguies (as Tony de la Moguies)	Larry Santiago Productions	Comedy	
Multo Sa Opera	Mario Barri	Leopoldo Salcedo, Nina Navarro, Antonio de la Moguies (as Tony de la Moguies), Lydia Resma, Ching Macadasco, Ben Perez, Elvira Reyes, Fernando Poe	Fernando Poe Productions	Horror	Filipino version of The Phantom of the Opera first film appearance of Fernando Poe Jr. in a cameo role
Mutya Ng Paaralan	Eduardo de Castro	Anita Linda, Eddie del Mar, Lopito, Abraham Cruz, Polly Cayetano, Ricardo Villa Camua, Ben Balatbat, Isagani Santos, Cesar Bandong, Zeny Zavalla, Helen Ponce de Leon, Smile Bengco, Ed Maceda, Girlie Riviera, Oscar Ocampo	Balatbat-Flores Productions, Premiere Productions	Drama	serialized in Bulaklak Magazine
Nagkita si Kerubin at si Tulisang Pugot	Octavio Silos	Fred Montilla, Linda Estrella, Tessie Agana, Norma Vales, Rudy Francisco, Luis Gonzales, Chichay, Tolindoy, Imelda Concepcion, Jose de Villa, Bert Olivar, Panchito, Pablo Raymundo	Sampaguita Pictures	Drama, Fantasy	Based on illustrated novel with the same title written by Clodualdo del Mundo Sr. and Gemiliano Pineda and illustrated by Tenny Henson (as Teny Henson) and Manuel Carillo published in Hiwaga Komiks, 1954.
Paladin	Eduardo de Castro	Edna Luna, Johnny Monteiro, Oscar Keesee, Ramon d'Salva, Lauro Delgado, Jose Romulo, Nello Nayo, Luis Ferrer (Introducing)	Premiere Productions	Action, Adventure, Fantasy, Swashbuckler	
Parole: Pansamantalang Paglaya	Pio Gomez Salcedo	Leopoldo Salcedo, Arsenia Francisco, Quiel Segovia, Rosa Aguirre, Rolando Liwanag, Romy Brion, Leopoldo Salcedo Jr. Geracio Salas, Rodolfo Segovia, Nely Jaldon (Introducing), Restie Salas	Larry Santiago Productions	Drama	
Pasiya Ng Langit	Susana C. de Guzman	Celia Flor, Mario Montenegro, Priscilla Cellona, Ven Medina, Priscilla Ramirez, Jose Corazon de Jesus, Candida Balderrama	LVN Pictures	Drama	dramatized over DZBC Radio
Pedro Penduko	Gerardo de Leon	Efren Reyes, Edna Luna, Lopito, Ramon d'Salva, Ruben Rustia, Lito Anzures, Purita Alma, Nina Morales(Introducing), Renato Robles (Introducing)	People's Pictures, Premiere Productions	Fantasy	based on a Filipino comic hero character created by Francisco V. Coching and serialized in Liwayway Magazine
Pilya	Tony Cayado	Gloria Romero, Ric Rodrigo, Roberto Gonzales, Lolita Rodriguez, Rebecca del Río, Jose de Villa, Horacio Morelos, Justina David, Conchita Carreon, Tony Cayado, Pepito Vera-Perez	Sampaguita Pictures	Comedy	serialized in Liwayway magazine
Playboy	Artemio Marquez	Fred Montilla, Anita Linda, Rosa Aguirre, Miguel Anzures, Caviteno Ilano, Belen Velasco	Deegar Cinema, LVN Pictures	Drama	dramatized over DZBC Radio
Por Biba Gid	Artemio Marquez	Fred Montilla, Anita Linda, Lopito	Freedom Pictures	Comedy	
Prinsipe Teñoso	Gregorio Fernandez	Mario Montenegro, Delia Razon, Oscar Obligacion, Alfonso Carvajal, Frankie Gordon, Tony Santos, Ven Medina, Arturo Moran, Carmencita Abad, Cecilia Lopez, Liza Rivera, Lourdes Yumul	LVN Pictures	Action, Adventure, Fantasy, Romance, Swashbuckler	
Pusong Ginto	Rolando del Mar	Leopoldo Salcedo, Leila Morena, Paraluman, Patricia Mijares, Jose Villafranca, Caviteno Ilano, Eddie del Mar	Deegar Cinema Inc.	Romance	
Rigiding		Anita Linda	People's Pictures	Comedy	
Sa Isang Halik Mo Pancho	Armando Garces	Tita Duran, Pancho Magalona, Dolphy, Bayani Casimiro, Carding Cruz	Sampaguita Pictures	Comedy, Drama, Romance	a sequel to Sa Isang Sulyap Mo Tita (1953)
Sa Kabila Ng Bukas	Consuelo P. Osorio	Jose Padilla, Edna Luna, Rosita Noble, Lopito, Amado Cortez, Leticia Ojera, Carol Varga, Bebong Osorio, Nello Nayo, Paquito Salcedo, Felisa Abad, Lito Anzures, Jose Lapid, Tony Palomer, Tony Osorio, Zeny Zabala, Candido Manahan	Premiere Productions	Drama	serialized in Liwayway magazine
Sabungera	Tony Cayado	Ric Rodrigo, Lolita Rodriguez, Dolphy, Boy Alano, Rosa Mia, Rebecca del Rio, Horacio Morelos, Jose de Villa	Sampaguita Pictures	Comedy	dramatized over DZRH radio
Salabusab	Cesar Gallardo	Efren Reyes, Leila Morena, Johnny Monteiro, Fernando Royo, Gloria Sevilla, Lauro Delgado, Bebong Osorio, Nello Nayo, Jose Romulo, Vicente Liwanag, Lito Anzures, Ric Bustamante, Bruno Punzalan, Kulafu	Premiere Productions	Action	Winner of the Best Picture and Best Director awards at the 3rd FAMAS Awards serialized in Liwayway magazine
Sarawak	Tor Villano	Oscar Moreno, Paraluman, Elvira Reyes, Sonia Reyes, Restie Sandel, Basilio de Luis, Nilda Balmori, Linda Martinez (Introducing)	Palanca Bros. Productions	Action, Adventure, Drama	serialized in Bulaklak Magazine
Selosong Balo	Quin Velasco	Pugo, Togo (Ghost), Rebecca Gonzales, Eddie San Jose, Dely Atay-Atayan, Cris de Vera, Juanito, Sepa	V Productions	Comedy	
Sex Gang	Mike Velarde	Jose Padilla Jr., Eddie del Mar, Rosita Noble, Fernando Royo, Elvira Reyes, Oscar Keesee, Lopito, Vicente Liwanag, Lydia Resma, Leonora Ruiz, Mario Barri	Golvel Pictures	Drama	
Si Eva at si Adan	Gerardo de Leon	Edna Luna, Johnny Monteiro, Carol Varga, Vicente Liwanag, Nello Nayo, Sonia Sandejas	Manuel Vistan Jr. Productions Inc., Premiere Productions	Comedy	
Si Og Sa Army	Cesar Gallardo	Jesus Ramos, Rosita Noble, Lopito, Carol Varga, Ramon d'Salva, Vicente Liwanag, Nello Nayo, Abraham Cruz, Lydia Resma	Larry Santiago Productions, Premiere Productions	Action	serialized in Bulaklak Magazine
Singsing Na Tanso	Gregorio Fernandez	Tessie Quintana, Nestor de Villa, Tony Santos, Alfonso Carvajal, Leroy Salvador, Carmencita Abad	LVN Pictures	Swashbuckler	in Ansco color
Takas!	Eddie Romero	Fred Montilla, Nena Cardenas, Ike Jarlego Jr., Mercedita Sevilla	Deegar Cinema Inc.	Action, Drama	dramatized over DZBB radio
Tinedyer	Tony Arnaldo	Nida Blanca, Nestor de Villa, Emma Alegre, Manding Claro, Nenita Vidal, Zeny Zabala	LVN Pictures	Comedy	
Tinalikdang Dambana	Billy Icasiano	Jaime de la Rosa, Celia Flor, Tony Santos, Joseph de Cordova, Oscar Obligacion, Priscilla Ramirez, Ched Bermudez, Zenny Baby, Eduardo Rodriguez, Vicenta Advincula, Vicente Medina, Purita Alma, Francisco Estacio	LVN Pictures	Drama	based on the Colgate-Palmolive Peet and dramatized over DZRH radio
Tres Muskiteras	Nardo Vercudia	Cesar Ramirez, Myrna Delgado, Norma Vales, Ric Rodrigo, Aruray, Precy Ortega, Rebecca del Rio, Bayani Casimiro, Jose de Villa, Lolita Rodriguez(cameo)	Sampaguita Pictures	Swashbuckler	serialized in Bulaklak Magazine and Alimyon
Tres Ojos	Octavio Silos	Cesar Ramirez, Nena Cardenas, Myrna Delgado, Van de Leon, Rosa Mia, Jose de Villa, Etang Discher, Martin Marfil, Manolo Noble, Tony Dungan, Leleng Isla, Pepito Vera-Perez, Apolonia Aguilar, Waldo Orendain, Lolita Rodriguez	Sampaguita Pictures	Fantasy	serialized in Pilipino Komiks
Tucydides	Artemio Marquez	Lilia Dizon, Armando Goyena, Milagros Naval, Cecilia Lopez, Eusebio Gomez, Jose Cris Soto, Florentino Ballecer, Victor Blanco, Pacita Corrales, Belen Velasco	LVN Pictures	Adventure, Sci-fi	dramatized over DZBC Radio
Ukala (Ang Walang Suko)	Artemio B. Tecson	Cesar Ramirez, Alicia Vergel, Chichay, Tolindoy, Bert Olivar, Eddie Garcia, Martin Marfil, Conrado Conde, Jaime Javier, Teroy de Guzman, Panchito, Pablo Raymundo, Mila Oswald, Herminia Carranza, Joe Sison, Apolonia Aguilar, Corazon Rivas, Nony Padilla (The children), Sonny Padilla (The children)	Sampaguita Pictures	Action, Period, Western	written and illustrated by Alfredo Alcala and serialized in Pilipino Komiks 1952 - 1953
Virtuoso	Fred Daluz	Jaime de la Rosa, Delia Razon, Milagros Naval, Joseph de Cordova, Eusebio Gomez, Frank Gordon, Cora Madrid, Priscilla Ramirez, Zenaida Baby, Hector Reyes	LVN Pictures	Musical, Romance	dramatized over DZBC radio
Waray Waray	F.H. Constantino	Nida Blanca, Nestor de Villa, Lorna Mirasol, Leroy Salvador, Naty Bernardo, Pianing Vidal, Nora Dy, Ike Jarlego Jr., Natoy B. Catindig, Lourdes Yumul, Cita Javellana, Pacita Corrales, Jesus Caballero, Pining Regala, Tony Arnaldo	LVN Pictures	Comedy, Romance	followed by Handang Matodas (1956), Anak ni Waray (1958), Anak ni Waray vs Anak ni Biday (1984)
1955
1 2 3		Carmencita Abad, Emma Alegre, Nestor de Villa, Delia Razon	LVN Pictures	Romance	
Adventures of DI-13	Cesar Gallardo	Jose Romulo, Arsenia Francisco, Rosita Noble, Lopito, Ramon d'Salva, Justina David	Larry Santiago Productions, Premiere Productions	Action, Drama	Filipino version of James Bond, serialized in Pilipino Komiks
Ambrosia	Larry Santiago	Anita Linda, Jose Padilla, Norma Blancaflor, Cynthia Zamora, Carlos Padilla, Amelita Sol, Abraham Cruz, Baby Zobel, Jose Garcia, Abelardo Cruz, Francisco Cruz, Francisco Salcedo, Max Alvarado, Tony Palomer, Boy Soriano	Larry Santiago Productions	Action, Adventure, Drama	serialized in Bulaklak Magazine and dramatized over DZBC Radio
Anak Ng Berdugo	Richard Abelardo	Armando Goyena, Cecilia Lopez, Johnny Reyes, Oscar Keesee, Joseph de Cordova, Oscar Obligacion, Dan Masinas, Jose Vergara, Nela Alvarez, Leonora Ruiz, Sim Pajarillo	LVN Pictures	Action, Adventure, Drama, Fantasy, Romance	serialized in Romansa Komiks
Anak ni Palaris	Mario T. Barri	Fernando Poe, Jr., Rosita Noble, Ramon d'Salva, Ruben Rustia, Purita Alma, Pedro Faustino, Cecilio Joaquin	Fernando Poe Productions	Action, Period	The first film of Fernando Poe Jr. He did the movie when he was only 14 years old.
Ang Ibong Adarna	Manuel Conde	Nida Blanca, Nestor de Villa, Carlos Salazar, Nita Javier, Cecilia Lopez, Jose Vergara	LVN Pictures	Adventure, Fantasy	first Filipino film ever to gross one million pesos in the Philippines
Ang Tangi kong Pag-ibig	Mar S. Torres	Carmen Rosales, Rogelio de la Rosa, Norma Vales, Luis Gonzales, Rosa Mia, Horacio Morelos, Bert Olivar, Pablo Raymundo, Eddie Arenas	Sampaguita Pictures	Romance, Comedy, Musical	serialized in Alimyon and Bulaklak Magazines
Artista	N/A	Rogelio de la Rosa, Gloria Romero, Luis Gonzales, Tito Garces, Dolphy, Chichay, Cesar Ramirez, Alicia Vergel, Eddie Arenas, Myrna Delgado, Tolindoy	Sampaguita Pictures	Comedy	
Balisong	Conrado Conde	Alicia Vergel, Ramon Revilla, Van de Leon, Dolphy, Manolo Noble, Maria Cristina, Jose de Villa, Panchito, Bert Olivar, Martin Marfil, Pablo Raymundo, Totoy Torrente, Eddie Arenas	Sampaguita Pictures	Action	serialized in Liwayway magazine by H. Koronel and S. Bautista
Banal O Makasalanan	Susana C. de Guzman	Delia Razon, Mario Montenegro, Joseph de Cordova, Jose Vergara, Arturo Moran, Vicenta Advincula, Candida Balderrama, Emelita Gutierrez, Jose Corazon de Jesus Jr.	LVN Pictures	Drama, Romance, History	dramatized over DZPI Radio
Banda Uno	Tony Santos	Armando Goyena, Nita Javier, Nenita Vidal, Manding Claro, Alfonso Carvajal, Bayani Casimiro, Oscar Obligacion, Hector Reyes, Miniong Alvarez	LVN Pictures	Romance	dramatized over DZBC Radio
Bandilang Pula	Nardo Vercudia	Linda Estrella, Eddie del Mar, Anita Linda, Amado Cortez, Fernando Royo, Lydia Resma, Baby Zobel, Jaime Vargas, Celia Fuentes	Bonifer Productions, Everlasting Pictures	Action, War	
Baril o Araro?	Alex M. Sunga, Pedro S. Vera	Jose Padilla Jr., Virginia Montes, Tessie Agana, Amado Cortez, Crising Aligada, Joe Sison, Amelita Sol, Engracio Ibarra, Deleng Tinoco, Roger Cardinal, Ric Bustamante	Filipiniana Pictures	Action	
Batas Ng Alipin	Octavio Silos	Ric Rodrigo, Lolita Rodriguez, Tito Galla, Liberty Ilagan, Pablo Guevarra, Riño. Isa, Matimtiman Cruz, Priscilla Valdez, Eddie Gutierrez, Boy Alano, Aring Bautista	Sampaguita Pictures	Drama	serialized in Hiwaga Komiks
Bim, Bam, Bum	Olive La Torre	Gloria Romero, Ramon Revilla, Chichay, Rod Navarro, Aruray, Tolindoy, Etang Discher	Sampaguita Pictures	Comedy	serialized in Tagalog Klasiks
Binibining Kalog	Octavio Silos	Ramon Revilla, Lolita Rodriguez, Rudy Francisco, Rosa Mia, Tolindoy, Manolo Noble, Rod Navarro, Zeny Zabala, Ben Johnson, Precy Ortega, Nelly Baylon	Sampaguita Pictures	Comedy	serialized in Liwayway magazine by R.L. Jose and F.A. Cortez
Bulaklak sa Parang	Octavio Silos	Pancho Magalona, Lolita Rodriguez, Luis Gonzales, Eddie Arenas, Justina David, Rebecca del Rio, Horacio Morelos	Sampaguita Pictures	Drama	serialized in Liwayway magazine by R.L. Jose and F.A. Cortez
Contravida	Olive La Torre	Fred Montilla, Myrna Delgado, Lolita Rodriguez, Luis Gonzales, Eddie Garcia, Precy Ortega, Panchito, Aruray, Etang Discher	Sampaguita Pictures	Action	
Dakilang Hudas	Teodorico C. Santos	Jose Padilla, Arsenia Francisco, Jose Romulo, Carol Varga, Ruben Rustia, Cynthia Zamora, Nello Nayo, Lito Anzures, Oscar Roncal, Renato Robles, Belen Velasco, Bruno Punzalan, Max Alvarado	People's Pictures	Action, Drama, Romance	serialized in Bulaklak Magazine
Dalagang Taring	Dr. Gregorio Fernandez	Delia Razon, Nestor de Villa, Rosa Aguirre, Arturo Moran, Merly Fernandez, Vic Silayan, Lourdes Yumul, Pianing Vidal, Mario Roldan, Natoy Katindig, Ramon Yulo	LVN Pictures	Drama	dramatized over DZBC Radio
Dalagita't Binatilyo	Armando Canseco	Nenita Vidal, Manding Claro, Nora Dy, Bayani Casimiro, Milani Villongco, Hector Reyes, Arturo Sison, Romeo Flores, Antonio de los Angeles, Mervin Silva, Mervin Fabian, Dolores Fabian, Antonio Medina, Menandro Ramos, Fernando Nangan	LVN Pictures	Musical	dramatized over DZBC Radio
Darling Ko	F.H. Constantino	Nida Blanca, Nestor de Villa, Lorna Mirasol, Leroy Salvador	LVN Pictures	Comedy, Musical, Romance	
Despatsadora	Tony Cayado	Gloria Romero, Luis Gonzales, Dolphy, Rosa Mia, Aruray, Bella Flores, Eddie Garcia, Panchito, Etang Discher	Sampaguita Pictures	Comedy	
Dinayang Pagmamahal	Rino Bermudez	Jaime de la Rosa, Charito Solis, Rebecca del Río, Vic Silayan, Fely Acuna, Florentino Ballecer, Priscilla Ramirez, Ched Bermudez, Rudy Farol, Baby Zeny, Lita Gutierrez	LVN Pictures	Romance	
Divisoria Quiapo	Luis Calasanz	Leopoldo Salcedo, Gloria Sevilla, Eleanor Medina, Rosa Aguirre, Gregorio Ticman, Romy Brion, B. Francisco, Ben Cosca, Helen Nazario, Ruben Tagalog, Ben & Ading	NP Productions	Drama	
El Jugador	Nemesio E. Caravana	Edna Luna, Jose Romulo, Corazon Rivas, Lauro Delgado, Ramon d'Salva, Ruben Rustia, Lito Anzures, Neonita Bona	People's Pictures, Premiere Productions	Swashbuckler	serialized in Liwayway magazine
Eskrimador	Teodorico C. Santos	Efren Reyes, Edna Luna, Johnny Monteiro, Corazon Rivas, Lauro Delgado,	People's Pictures, Premiere Productions	Swashbuckler	serialized in Hiwaga Komiks
Guerrero	Teodorico C. Santos	Johnny Monteiro (as Juan Monteiro), Arsenia Francisco, Eddie del Mar, Edna Luna, Ramon d'Salva, Ruben Rustia, Vicente Liwanag, Purita Alma, Nello Nayo, Ric Bustamante	People's Pictures, Premiere Productions	Drama, History, War	serialized in Hiwaga Komiks by Cirio H. Santiago
Ha cha cha	Nemesio E. Caravana	Jose Padilla Jr., Olivia Cenizal, Corazon Rivas, Jose Romulo, Lopito, Abraham Cruz	People's Pictures, Premiere Productions	Musical	serialized in Liwayway magazine
Hagad	Rino Bermudez	Armando Goyena, Rosa Rosal, Carmencita Abad, Nenita Vidal, Ike Jarlego Jr.	LVN Pictures	Drama	
Higit sa Lahat	Dr. Gregorio Fernandez	Rogelio de la Rosa, Emma Alegre, Ike Jarlego Jr., Oscar Keesee, Jose Corazon de Jesus Jr., Vic Silayan, Eddie Rodriguez, Cynthia Gomez, Rosa Aguirre, Ludy Carmona, Lita Gutierrez, Gerry de los Reyes, Venchito Galvez, Natoy B. Catindig, Leonardo Fernandez, Sim Pajarillo, Nony Padilla, June Manalang, Tony Cantero, Andres Iturbi	LVN Pictures	Drama	the film earned five FAMAS (Philippines' equivalent of the Academy Awards) trophies including Best Picture and Best Actor for dela Rosa. This film also won the prestigious Best Director award for Gregorio Fernandez and Best Actor award for Rogelio de la Rosa at the 1956 Asian Film Festival in Tokyo
Hindi Basta Basta	Tony Cayado	Gloria Romero, Ric Rodrigo, Dolphy, Daisy Romualdez, Eddie Arenas, Juancho Gutierrez	Sampaguita Pictures	Musical	serialized in Liwayway magazine
Hootsy Kootsy	Mar S. Torres	Dolphy, Gloria Romero, Luis Gonzales, Zeny Zabala, Horacio Morelos, Herminia Carranza	Sampaguita Pictures	Comedy	serialized in Espesyal Komiks
Ikaw Kasi	Manuel Conde	Nida Blanca, Nestor de Villa, Nenita Vidal, Manding Claro, Oscar Keesee, Naty Bernardo, Jose Vergara, Mario Roldan, Pianing Vidal, Ben Castillo, Greg Urbano, Aida Cariño, Val Castelo (Introducing)	LVN Pictures	Comedy, Romance	dramatized over DZBC Radio
Indian Pana	F.H. Constantino	Mario Montenegro, Nida Blanca, Ike Jarlego Jr., Tessie San Juan, Jose Vergara, Ven Medina, Monang Carvajal (as Patring Carvajal), Perla Garcia, Doro de los Ojos	LVN Pictures	Comedy, Western	
Ito Ang Aming Daigdig	George Santos	Leopoldo Salcedo, Gloria Sevilla, Rebecca Gonzales, Ramon d'Salva, Eleanor Medina, Rafael Jimenez, Romy Brion, Ana Maria, Bert Ama, Melita del Sol, Isabelita Alma, Ric Bustamante, Ben Castillo, Rey Aviles, Bulaklak 3 Hari, Victor Insa, Baby Annabelle	Fama Pictures	Drama	
Iyung-Iyo	Jose de Villa	Carmen Rosales, Rogelio de la Rosa, Bella Flores, Eddie Garcia, Imelda Concepcion, Manolo Noble, Etang Discher, Celia Fuentes, Horacio Morelos, Norma Vales, Teroy de Guzman	Sampaguita Pictures	Drama, Romance	serialized in Liwayway magazine
Karnabal	Joe Climaco	Carlos Salazar, Emma Alegre, Carmencita Abad, Leroy Salvador, Oscar Keesee, Bayani Casimiro, Ludy Carmona, Ramon Monroy, Sim Pajarillo	LVN Pictures	Romance	
Kontrabida	Olive La Torre	Fred Montilla, Myrna Delgado, Lolita Rodriguez, Luis Gonzales, Eddie Garcia, Precy Ortega, Panchito	Sampaguita Pictures	Action	
Kuripot	Tony Cayado	Alicia Vergel, Cesar Ramirez, Van de Leon, Boy Alano, Rebecca del Rio	Sampaguita Pictures	Comedy	dramatized over DZRH radio
Lapu-Lapu	Lamberto V. Avellana	Mario Montenegro, Delia Razon, Priscilla Cellona, Oscar Keesee, Johnny Reyes, Ven Medina, Vic Silayan, Jose Vergara, Eusebio Gomez, Oscar Obligacion, Sim Pajarillo, Dan Masinas, Miguel Lopez, Zeny Garcia, Arturo Moran, Monang Carvajal, Mario Roldan, Ricardo Llorin, Miniong Alvarez, Jose de Castro, Loida Morales, Victor Aguilar, Leonardo Fernandez, Ramon Roy, Emilio Valdez, Francisco Quintana, Basilio Cerdon	LVN Pictures	Biopic, Historical	serialized in Pilipino Komiks
Lelong Mong Panot	Manolo Canseco	Pugo, Nenita Vidal, Manding Claro, Lita Gutierrez, Ben Delgado, Bayani Casimiro, Naty Bernardo, Jose Corazon de Jesus Jr.	LVN Pictures	Comedy	
Lola Sinderella	Rico Bello Omagap	Eddie Arenas, Rebecca del Río, Pancho Magalona, Lolita Rodriguez	Sampaguita Pictures	Fantasy	
Lupang Kayumanggi	Armando Garces	Cesar Ramirez, Alicia Vergel, Van de Leon, Norma Vales, Tito Garcia, Panchito, Daisy Romualdez, Eddie Garcia, Martin Marfil, Aring Bautista, Marcela Garcia, Totoy Torrente, Apolonia Aguilar, Venchito Galvez	Sampaguita Pictures	Drama	This is one of the few movies in which Panchito(partner of Dolphy) did a serious role. He made a convincing performance in this movie that made him won the FAMAS for best supporting actor. serialized in Alimyon and Bulaklak Magazine
Mag-asawa'y Di Biro	Emmanuel I. Rojas	Leila Morena, Efren Reyes, Lopito, Abraham Cruz, Belen Velasco, Paquito Salcedo	Premiere Productions, People's Pictures	Comedy, Romance	serialized in Liwayway magazine
Magica Blanca	Nemesio E. Caravana	Leopoldo Salcedo, Anita Linda, Eddie del Mar(as Eduardo del Mar), Ramon d'Salva, Cynthia Zamora	Premiere Productions, Larry Santiago Productions	Fantasy	serialized in Liwayway magazine
Mambo Dyambo	Octavio Silos	Fred Montilla, Alicia Vergel, Dolphy, Bella Flores, Eddie Garcia, Aring Bautista, Tony Dungan, Jaime Javier, Cora Maceda	Sampaguita Pictures	Comedy, Fantasy	serialized in Pilipino Komiks
Maria Went to Town	Eddie Romero	Tita Duran, Pancho Magalona, Carlos Padilla Jr., Lorna Mirasol, Baby Susan Magalona	Deegar Cinema	Musical	
Mariang Sinukuan	Richard Abelardo	Mario Montenegro, Cecilia Lopez, Milagros Naval, Bayani Casimiro, Jose Troni, Ludy Carmona, Priscilla Ramirez, Nela Alvarez, Mario Roldan, Florentino Garcia (as Tino Garcia), Loida Morales, Jerry Reyes, Vic Cabrera, Angel Castillo	LVN Pictures	Fantasy	serialized in Bulaklak Magazine
Mariposa	Mar S. Torres	Gloria Romero, Ric Rodrigo, Norma Vales, Rudy Francisco, Rosa Mia, Aruray, Bella Flores, Herminia Carranza, Rebecca del Río, Jose de Villa, Etang Discher, Panchito, Francisco Cruz	Sampaguita Pictures	Comedy	serialized in Espesyal Komiks
Minera	Nemesio E. Caravana	Jose Padilla Jr., Johnny Monteiro (as Juan Monteiro), Olivia Cenizal	People's Pictures, Premiere Productions	Drama, Romance	serialized in Liwayway magazine
Niña Bonita	F.H. Constantino	Charito Solis, Jaime de la Rosa, Milagros Naval, Gil de Leon, Eusebio Gomez, Arturo Moran, Joe Bautista, Johnny Legarda, Herminia Vicencio, Ben Alcantara, Eladia Corpus, Sim Pajarillo, George Hidalgo, Maria Hidalgo, Mercy Oria	LVN Pictures	Comedy, Romance	First film of Charito Solis which was also her first leading role To make a Filipino adaptation of Frank Capra's It Happened One Night (1934), LVN launched a search for a new face, an instant star so to speak, and that new face turned out to be Charito Solis. The film was a hit and Charito became the 'Cinderella Star' and eventually one of Philippine cinema's most enduring icons.
No Place to Hide	Josef Shaftel	David Brian, Marsha Hunt, Hugh Corcoran, Ike Jarlego Jr., Candy the Wonder Dog, Celia Flor, Manuel Silos, Eddie Infante, Lou Salvador, Pianing Vidal, Alfonso Carvajal, Oscar Keesee, Joseph de Cordova, Vicente Advincula, Jose Avellana	Allied Artists Pictures, LVN Pictures, Lebran-Movietec	Drama, Thriller	
Palahamak	Artemio Marquez	Jose Padilla Jr., Leila Morena, Carol Varga, Lauro Delgado, Olivia Cenizal	People's Pictures, Premiere Productions	Drama	Olivia Cenizal was introduced in this movie. Producer Cirio H. Santiago encouraged Olivia, the wife of a Premiere Production musical director to try her luck in acting. When Olivia agreed, Santiago immediately included her in this movie. dramatized over DZBC Radio
Palasyong Pawid	Jose Climaco	Emma Alegre, Florentino Ballecer, Tessie Quintana, Leroy Salvador, Pianing Vidal	LVN Pictures	Drama	
Paltik	Cirio H. Santiago	Jose Padilla Jr., Efren Reyes, Arsenia Francisco, Virginia Montes, Mario Barri, Nello Nayo, Carol Varga	People's Pictures, Premiere Productions	Action, Drama	serialized in Pilipino Komiks
Pandanggo ni Neneng	Josefino Cenizal	Rogelio de la Rosa, Olivia Cenizal, Lopito, Carol Varga, Lauro Delgado, Pedro Faustino, Dadang Ortega, Isa Rino, Josefino Cenizal	People's Pictures, Premiere Productions	Musical	serialized in Liwayway magazine
Pandora	Cesar Gallardo	Leila Morena, Jose Romulo, Carol Varga, Lopito, Neonita Bona, Abelardo Cortez, Belen Velasco, Francisco Cruz	Premiere Productions	Drama, Romance	Based on the illustrated novel Pandora published by Pilipino Komiks, 1954-1955. It is written by Pablo S. Gomez as Carlos Gonda, his pseudonym and illustrated by Federico Javinal.
Pangako Ng Puso	Artemio Marquez	Jose Padilla Jr., Arsenia Francisco, Olivia Cenizal, Carol Varga, Ruben Rustia, Baby Zobel, Lito Anzures, Mely Vetales, Guillermo Carls, Baby Carmelita	Larry Santiago Productions, Premiere Productions	Romance	serialized over DZBC Radio and serialized in Bulaklak Magazine
Panyolitong Bughaw	Guillermo J. Icasiano (as Billy Icasiano)	Celia Flor, Mario Montenegro, Carmencita Abad, Tessie San Juan, Eusebio Gomez, Ven Medina, Jose Troni, Miguel Lopez, Priscilla Ramirez, Miniong Alvarez, Loida Morales, Francisco Estacio	LVN Pictures	Drama	serialized in Bulaklak Magazine
Papa Loves Mambo	Rolando del Mar	Danilo Montes, Gloria Sevilla, Ricky Blake, Cris de Vera, Lou Salvador, Antonio de la Moguies (as Tony de la Moguies), Veronica Palileo	Deegar Cinema	Musical	dramatized over DZPI radio
Pasikat	Fred Daluz	Carlos Salazar, Emma Alegre, Leroy Salvador, Fely Acuna (Introducing), Naty Bernardo, Joseph de Cordova (as Jose de Cordova), Jose Troni	LVN Pictures	Romance	dramatized over DZPI radio
Pilipino Kostum No Touch	Manuel Conde	Mario Montenegro, Emma Alegre, Leroy Salvador, Alfonso Carvajal, Bayani Casimiro, Naty Bernardo, Jose Corazon de Jesus Jr., Dan Masinas, Fely Acuna, Lita Gutierrez, Donato Buencamino	LVN Pictures	Comedy	
R.O.T.C.	Octavio Silos	Myrna Delgado, Carmen Rosales, Ric Rodrigo, Oscar Moreno, Imelda Concepcion, Cesar Ramirez, Tita de Villa	Sampaguita Pictures	Comedy	serialized in Hiwaga Komiks
Rosana	Armando Garces	Ric Rodrigo, Lolita Rodriguez, Norma Vales, Daisy Romualdez (Introducing), Jose de Villa, Rosa Mia	Sampaguita Pictures	Drama	serialized in Bulaklak Magazine
Rosita Nobles		Fernando Poe, Jr.		Action	
Sa Dulo Ng Landas	Armando Garces	Pancho Magalona, Ramon Revilla, Myrna Delgado, Lolita Rodriguez, Panchito, Marcela Garcia, Horacio Morelos, Herminia Carranza, Apolonia Aguilar, Elena Adorable, Clara Yumul, Chichay, Justina David, Tolindoy	Sampaguita Pictures	Drama, Romance	serialized in Liwayway magazine
Sagrado	Cesar Gallardo	Leila Morena, Efren Reyes, Lopito, Lauro Delgado, Carol Varga, Ruben Rustia, Nello Nayo, Cynthia Zamora, Renato Robles, Venchito Galvez, Bruno Punzalan, Lito Anzures	People's Pictures, Premiere Productions	Drama	
Salamangkero	Manuel Silos	Delia Razon, Carlos Salazar, Nita Javier, Vic Silayan, Eusebio Gomez, Chito Navarro, Miguel Lopez, Jose Troni, Tony Dantes, Ched Bermudez, Priscilla Ramirez, Canuplin, Prof. Raydu	LVN Pictures	Fantasy	serialized in Espesyal Komiks
Salingsing Sa Kasakit	Natalio Bacalso	Undo Juizan		Drama	
Sanda Wong	Gerardo de Leon	Jose Padilla Jr., Lilia Dizon, Danilo Montes, Lola Young, Gil de Leon, Vicente Liwanag, Mario Barri, Bruno Punzalan, Ligaya Lopez	Chapman Productions, Manuel Vistan Jr. Productions, Premiere Productions Inc.	Action	
Sapagkat Mahal Kita	Consuelo P. Osorio	Manuel Barbeyto, Metring David, Benny Mack, Consuelo P. Osorio, Jose Padilla Jr., Rosita Rivera, Antonia Santos, Tessie Santos, Lirio Yabut	Fremel Pictures	Romance	
Saydwok Bendor	Lamberto V. Avellana	Jaime de la Rosa, Nida Blanca, Nita Javier, Manuel Silos, Alfonso Carvajal, Tony Santos, Joseph de Cordova (as Jose de Cordova), Oscar Obligacion, Priscilla Ramirez, Pamboy	LVN Pictures	Comedy	serialized over DZBC Radio
Sintu-Sinto	Artemio B. Tecson	Fred Montilla, Paraluman, Maria Cristina, Pat Ilano, Bentot (as Ben Cosca), Metring David, Menggay, Roger Cardinal, Banding Javier, Lulu Santos, Ric Gutierrez, Sabas San Juan, Helen Nazario, Eddie San Jose, Danny Holmsen, Ruben Tagalog (Voice), Paquito Toledo, Bobby Gonzales	Deegar Cinema, Freedom Pictures	Comedy	
Sonny Boy	Susana C. de Guzman	Rogelio de la Rosa, Rosa Rosal, Cecilia Lopez, Ike Jarlego Jr., Rosa Aguirre, Johnny Reyes, Joseph de Cordova (as Jose de Cordova), Vicente Advincula, Eddie Rodriguez, Lourdes Galicia, Ramon Roy, Emiliano de Guzman, Betty Belardo	LVN Pictures	Drama	serialized in Liwayway magazine
Tagapagmana		Carmencita Abad, Alona Alegre, Emma Alegre, Florentino Ballecer, Teody Belarmino, Monang Carvajal, Carlos Salazar, Leroy Salvador, Jose Villafranca	LVN Pictures	Drama	Alona Alegre was introduced in this film
Talusaling	F. H. Constantino	Nida Blanca, Nestor de Villa, Rebecca del Río, Eddie Rodriguez, Vicenta Advincula, Monang Carvajal, Priscilla Ramirez, Ludy Carmona, Miniong Alvarez, Levi Celerio, Letty Marcellana, Loida Morales	LVN Pictures	Comedy, Romance	serialized in Espesyal Komiks
Tatay Na Si Bondying	Armando Garces	Fred Montilla, Myrna Delgado, Norma Vales, Dolphy, Chichay, Tolindoy, Gregorio Ticman, Eddie Garcia, Jose de Villa, Leonora Ruiz, Teroy de Guzman, Carding Cruz, Justina David	Sampaguita Pictures	Comedy	
Tomboy		Nena Cardenas, Ramon d'Salva	Filipinas Productions	Comedy	
Torpe	Eddie Romero	Carlos Padilla Jr., Rosita Noble, Elvira Reyes, Corazon Noble, Tito Arevalo, Miguel Anzures, Vilma Soriano, Ruben Rustia, Rosita Fernandez, Rod Navarro	Deegar Cinema	Drama	serialized in Hiwaga Komiks
Uhaw Na Pag-ibig	Olive La Torre	Carmen Rosales, Cesar Ramirez, Chichay, Tolindoy, Etang Discher, Precy Ortega, Manolo Noble, Horacio Morelos, Tony Dungan, Teroy de Guzman, Elena Adorable	Sampaguita Pictures	Romance	serialized in Liwayway magazine
Unang Halik	Artemio Marquez	Corazon Rivas, Jose Romulo, Lopito, Boy Francisco, Baby Zobel, Neonita Bona, Belen Velasco, Oscar Roncal, Baby Carmelita, Boy Planas, Cynthia Zamora (Introducing)	Premiere Productions	Comedy, Musical, Romance	serialized in Liwayway magazine
Waldas	Mar S. Torres	Pancho Magalona, Myrna Delgado, Van de Leon, Rosa Mia, Chichay, Eddie Garcia, Panchito Alba, Rod Navarro, Martin Marfil, Jose Salameda, Elena Adorable, Eddie Arenas, Teroy de Guzman, Conrado Conde	Sampaguita Pictures	Drama	serialized in Pilipino Komiks
1956
5 Hermanos	Artemio Marquez	Arsenia Francisco, Edna Luna, Cynthia Zamora, Carol Varga, Marissa Ibañez, Danilo Montes, Marcial Glorioso, Fernando Santiago, Paquito Salcedo, Resty Sandel, Felisa Salcedo, Doming del Valle, Erlinda Cuya, Ruby Rojas	People's Pictures	Drama	dramatized over DZBC Radio
Abandonado	Rino Bermudez	Armando Goyena, Tessie Quintana, Leroy Salvador, Carlos Salazar	LVN Pictures	Drama	serialized in Bulaklak Magazine
Aling Kutsero	Fred Daluz	Nida Blanca, Leroy Salvador, Nestor de Villa	LVN Pictures	Comedy	serialized in Hiwaga Komiks
Among Tunay	Susana C. de Guzman	Delia Razon, Mario Montenegro, Milagros Naval	LVN Pictures	Romance	serialized in Liwayway magazine
Anak dalita	Lamberto V. Avellana	Rosa Rosal, Tony Santos, Joseph de Cordova, Vic Silayan, Vic Bacani, Leroy Salvador, Rosa Aguirre, Oscar Keesee, Alfonso Carvajal, Johnny Reyes, Eddie Rodriguez, Arturo Moran	LVN Pictures	Crime, Drama	Copped the Golden Harvest Award (Best Picture) at the Film Festival in Asia in 1956. Official submission of the Philippines for the 'Best Foreign Language Film' category of the 29th Academy Awards in 1957.
Ang Buhay At Pag-ibig Ni Dr. Jose Rizal	Ramon A. Estella	Eduardo del Mar, Edna Luna, Corazon Rivas, Aida Serna, Anita Linda, Ramon d'Salva, Rodolfo Ruiz, Atang de la Rama, Riño. Isa (as Isa Riño), Nello Nayo, Abraham Cruz, Andres Centenera, Leticia Ojera, Jose Garcia, Ligaya Lopez	Balatbat and Bagumbayan Productions	Historical Drama	
Ang Sibat	Felix Villar	Celia Fuentes, Jesus 'Og' Ramos, Amado Cortez	Everlasting Pictures	Action, Adventure	serialized in Liwayway Magazine
Apat Na Kasaysayang Ginto	Teodorico C. Santos, Cirio H. Santiago, Cesar Gallardo, Gerardo de Leon	Rogelio de la Rosa, Pancho Magalona, Corazon Rivas, Cynthia Zamora, Arsenia Francisco, Danilo Montes, Lauro Delgado, Ruben Rustia, Jose Padilla Jr., Efren Reyes, Edna Luna, Jose Romulo, Carol Varga, Ramon d'Salva, Lopito, Vicente Liwanag, Leopoldo Salcedo, Anita Linda, Eduardo del Mar, Olivia Cenizal	Premiere Productions	Drama	
Babaing Mandarambong	Ding M. de Jesus	Johnny Monteiro, Celia Fuentes, Ruben Rustia, Fernando Poe Jr., Joe Sison, Bruno Punzalan, Purita Alma, Lito Anzures, Lydia Resma, Roberto Dantes, Ric Bustamante, Vicente Liwanag, Jaime Vargas	Everlasting Pictures	Action, Swashbuckler	
Babalu	Octavio Silos	Paraluman, Oscar Moreno, Ramon Revilla, Van de Leon, Daisy Romualdez	Sampaguita Pictures	Drama	serialized in Hiwaga Komiks
Bahala Na	Manuel Conde	Nida Blanca, Nestor de Villa, Leroy Salvador, Nita Javier, Arturo Moran, Charito de Leon, Elena Balmori, Nieves Manuel, Miriam Jurado, Era Maravillas, Joe Ramos, Greg Urbano, Dan Masinas, Ben Castillo, Miniong Alvarez	LVN Pictures	Drama	Color film
Bella Filipina	Gerardo de Leon	Tita Duran, Pancho Magalona, Vicente Liwanag, Dely Atay-atayan, Belen Velasco, The Reycards Duet, Dance Group Filipiniana	People's Pictures Inc.	Musical	serialized in Tagalog Klasiks
Big Shot	Richard Abelardo	Nestor de Villa, Charito Solis, Rosa Rosal	LVN Pictures	Drama	serialized in Hiwaga Komiks
Boksingera	Octavio Silos	Susan Roces, Luis Gonzales, Dolphy, Panchito, Nelly Baylon, Pacita Arana, Precy Ortega, Priscilla Concepcion, Lydia Correa, Cora Mallares, Apolonia Aguilar, Ely Roque	Sampaguita Pictures	Comedy	Adapted from the comics novel written by Mars Ravelo and illustrated by Jesse Santos published in Tagalog Klasiks of Ace Publications. Movie was originally intended for Alicia Vergel, but her contract with Sampaguita expired. When Alicia Vergel could not make the movie, newcomer Susan Roces was tapped to star in the movie, in what supposed to be her launching movie. Originally, it was intended as an action movie, with Alicia Vergel, then the action-movie queen. When Susan Roces replaced her, it was turned into a comedy-action-drama. Dolphy and Panchito were added for the comedy. The producer changed the title to Boksingera daw.. since they were not sure that the then 14-year-old Susan could be an effective boxer on screen. The producer, after watching the movie, stopped the release of the movie fearing that it might not click with the audience. They instead released another Susan Roces movie, titled Miss Tilapia (1956) before this one. When the movie Miss Tilapia was released, it flopped in the box office.
Chabacano	Octavio Silos	Myrna Delgado, Luis Gonzales, Dolphy, Daisy Romualdez, Barbara Perez, Chichay, Zeny Zabala, Rod Navarro, Precy Ortega, Herminia Carranza, Horacio Morelos, Justina David, Manolo Noble, Patty Maceda, Apolonia Aguilar	Sampaguita Pictures	Comedy	film debut of Barbara Perez
Chaperon	Tony Santos	Armando Goyena, Emma Alegre, Alfonso Carvajal	LVN Pictures	Drama	
Charito, I Love You	F.H. Constantino	Charito Solis, Leroy Salvador, Nita Javier, Eddie San Jose	LVN Pictures	Romance	
Cinco Hermanas	Artemio Marquez	Arsenia Francisco, Edna Luna, Cynthia Zamora, Carol Varga, Marissa Ibanez, Danilo Montes, Marcial Glorioso, Fernando Santiago, Paquito Salcedo, Resty Sandel, Felisa Salcedo, Domingo del Valle, Erlinda Cuya, Rubi Rojas	People's Pictures	Drama	
Dama Juana Gang	Tony Santos	Leroy Salvador, Charito Solis, Nenita Vidal, Manding Claro, Joseph de Cordova, Hector Reyes, Bert Aragon, Lito Carmelo, Cita Della, Paquito Toledo	LVN Pictures	Comedy	serialized in Bulaklak Magazine
Desperado	Ramon A. Estella	Efren Reyes, Olivia Cenizal, Lopito, Ramon d'Salva, Ligaya Lopez, Jose Garcia, Max Alvarado, Bino Garcia, Tony Palomer	People's Pictures	Action	
Don Cabarde	Ding M. de Jesus	Johnny Monteiro, Celia Fuentes	Everlasting Pictures	Action	serialized in Liwayway magazine
Easy Ka Lang, Padre!	F.H. Constantino	Nida Blanca, Nestor de Villa, Milagros Naval, Lita Gutierrez, Willie Sotelo	LVN Pictures	Comedy	dramatized over DZBC Radio
El Conde de Montecarlo	Cesar Gallardo	Rogelio de la Rosa, Cynthia Zamora, Corazon Rivas, Jose Romulo, Lauro Delgado, Ruben Rustia, Marissa Ibanez, Amado Cortez	People's Pictures	Swashbuckler	
Emma	Armando Garces	Lolita Rodriguez, Ric Rodrigo, Van de Leon, Amalia Fuentes, Juancho Gutierrez	Sampaguita Pictures	Drama, Romance	serialized in Alimyon and Bulaklak magazines
Everlasting	Jose Climaco (as Joe Climaco)	Mario Montenegro, Emma Alegre, Carmencita Abad, Pianing Vidal, Joseph de Cordova	LVN Pictures	Drama, Romance	serialized in Tagalog Klasiks
Exzur	Teodorico C. Santos	Jose Velez, Danilo Montes, Edna Luna, Jose Romulo, Cynthia Zamora, Lauro Delgado, Patria Plata, Belen Velasco, Ligaya Lopez, Jose Garcia, Renato Robles, Max Alvarado, Cielito Legaspi, Boy Soriano, Oscar Roncal	People's Pictures	Sci-Fi	first Filipino sci-fi film about alien invasion Serialized in Liwayway magazine Introduced in the film, the newcomer former Mr. Philippines winner Jose Velez in the titular character
Ganyan Ka Pala	F.H. Constantino	Nida Blanca, Nestor de Villa, Lita Gutierrez, Willie Sotelo	LVN Pictures	Musical	dramatized over DZBC Radio
Gigolo	Olive La Torre	Ric Rodrigo, Barbara Perez, Dolphy, Bella Flores, Paraluman, Eddie Garcia, Cesar Reyes, Venchito Galvez, Pablo Raymundo, Patty Maceda, Jaime Javier, Herminia Carranza, Santiago Dueñas, Zeny Zabala	Sampaguita Pictures	Drama	serialized in Pilipino Komiks
Gilda	Armando Garces	Lolita Rodriguez, Eddie Arenas, Rosa Mia, Maria Cristina, Eddie Garcia, Zeny Zabala, Pablo Guevarra, Leleng Isla, Aring Bautista, Marcela Garcia, Meldy Corrales	Sampaguita Pictures	Drama	serialized in Pilipino Komiks
Gintong Pangarap	Gregorio Fernandez (as Dr. Gregorio M. Fernandez)	Rogelio de la Rosa, Cecilia Lopez, Carlos Padilla Jr., Eddie Rodriguez, Luisa Montesa	LVN Pictures	Drama	
Handang Matodas	Manuel Conde	Nida Blanca, Nestor de Villa, Nita Javier, Naty Bernardo, Oscar Keesee, Val Castelo, Pedro Faustino	LVN Pictures	Comedy	dramatized over DZBC Radio
Haring Espada	Efren Reyes	Efren Reyes, Cesar Ramirez, Olivia Cenizal, Lopito, Ramon d'Salva, Melita de Leon, Nello Nayo, Jose Garcia, Marissa Ibanez	People's Pictures	Swashbuckler	serialized in Hiwaga Komiks
Haring Tulisan	Ding M. de Jesus	Anita Linda, Johnny Monteiro, Teody Belarmino, Ruben Rustia, Bruno Punzalan, Lito Anzures, Ric Bustamante, SOS Daredevils, Mario Escudero, Lani Oteyza, Rosanna Montez (as Rosanna Montes)	Everlasting Pictures	Action, Adventure	
Heneral Paua	Felix Villar	Danilo Montes, Cynthia Zamora, Ramon d'Salva, Reynaldo Dante, Teody Belarmino, Ben Perez, Rodolfo Ruiz	Larry Santiago Productions	Action, Drama, Historical	
Higit Sa Korona	Richard Abelardo	Delia Razon, Mario Montenegro, Rosa Rosal, Johnny Reyes, Jose Vergara, Alfonso Carvajal, Rosa Aguirre, Naty Bernardo, Jose Corazon de Jesus Jr.	LVN Pictures	Action, Drama, Historical	
Hokus Pokus	Cesar Gallardo	Jose Padilla Jr., Anita Linda, Edna Luna, Efren Reyes	People's Pictures	Action, Drama	serialized in Pilipino Komiks
Huling Mandirigma	Eddie Romero	Leopoldo Salcedo, Jose Padilla, Jr., Ben Perez, Melita de Leon, Cielito Legaspi, Belen Velasco, Jose Garcia, Boy Soriano, Bebong Osorio, Ligaya Lopez, Menggay, Abelardo Cortez, (as Abelardo Cortes), Max Alvarado	People's Pictures	Action	
Idolo	H.B. Katindig	Rogelio de la Rosa, Emma Alegre, Jose Vergara	LVN Pictures	Drama	serialized in Bulaklak Magazine
Ilaw Sa Karimlan	Susana C. de Guzman	Delia Razon, Mario Montenegro, Milagros Naval	LVN Pictures	Drama	serialized in Liwayway magazine
Inang Mahal	Octavio Silos	Van de Leon, Amalia Fuentes, Juancho Gutierrez, Rosa Mia, Jose Villafranca	Sampaguita Pictures	Drama	dramatized over DZRH radio
Kahariang Bato (English version: Tagani)	Rolf Bayer	Cesar Ramirez, Alicia Vergel, Jess Ramos (as Jesus 'Og' Ramos), Myrna Delgado, Bert Olivar, Bruno Punzalan, Andres Centenera, Ric Bustamante, Ely Nakpil, Sonia Reyes, Myrna Mirasol, SOS Daredevils, Helen Nazario	Tamaraw Studios	Action	This film was released in the Philippines in three language versions of Tagalog, Visayan and English: the Tagalog and Visayan versions were titled "Kahariang Bato" while the English release was called "Tagani". It's undetermined that the three language versions were either shot in those languages back-to-back or simply post-synced as either version is lost in the Philippines, but existing theatrical posters from the Philippines confirm that the film was released in those three language versions. The English version "Tagani" would eventually be picked up by American producer-director Al Adamson and be re-edited into his feature film "Horror of the Blood Monsters" for its 1970 release. It was first serialized in Liwayway magazine
Kanto Girl	Olive La Torre	Oscar Moreno, Lolita Rodriguez, Aruray, Bella Flores, Pablo Guevarra, Aring Bautista, Ven Medina, Martin Marfil, Venchito Galvez, Loida Medina, Jaime Javier, Etang Discher	Sampaguita Pictures	Comedy	
Katawang Lupa	Conrado Conde	Leopoldo Salcedo, Ramon Revilla, Lolita Rodriguez, Daisy Romualdez, Patria Plata	Sampaguita Pictures	Drama	serialized in Liwayway magazine
Kontra Partido	Octavio Silos	Rita Gomez, Eddie Arenas, Tolindoy, Pablo Guevarra, Nori Dalisay, Lydia Correa, Carmelita Isidro, Rod Navarro, Aruray, Boy Planas, Nelly Baylon, Leleng Isla, Priscilla Concepcion, Pacita Arana	Sampaguita Pictures	Comedy	serialized in Hiwaga Komiks
Krus Na Kawayan	Manuel Conde	Manuel Conde, Aida Cariño, Ding Tello, Myrna Mirsol, Bruno Punsalan, Ben Castillo, Africa de la Rosa, Totoy Torrente, Paul Salvacion, Julian Yulo, Solano Gaudite, Daniel Timog, Jun Urbano (as Manuel Urbano, Jr.), Ricardo Remias, Henry Urbano, Max Rodriguez, Betty Zamora	Manuel Conde Productions, Vietnam Film	Action	The film was shot in two versions, a Vietnamese and a Tagalog version, and with each version's main characters played by its own set of native actors. Two battalions of Vietnamese soldiers were engaged to act as extras for the film. The Vietnamese version, "Chung Toi Muon" was a blockbuster in Vietnam, while the dubbed English version, "Let Us Live", was viewed at international art theaters up to the mid-80s.
Kulang Sa Pito	Armando Garces	Dolphy, Eddie Arenas, Norma Vales, Susan Roces, Panchito(as Panchito Alba), Boy Planas	Sampaguita Pictures	Comedy, Musical	dramatized over DZRH radio
Kumander 13	Lamberto V. Avellana	Jaime de la Rosa, Carmencita Abad, Joseph de Cordova, Eddie Rodriguez, Johnny Reyes	LVN Pictures	Action	
Lagablab Sa Silangan (Sunset Over Korea)	Constancio T. Villamar	Gloria Romero, Amado Cortez, Rodolfo Ruiz, Mat Ranillo Jr., Jose Villafranca, Bulaklak Tatlonghari, Victor Insa	V-1 Cinema	Action	
Laging Ikaw	Rino Bermudez	Armando Goyena, Cecilia Lopez, Rebecca del Rio, Eddie Rodriguez	LVN Pictures	Romance	dramatized over DZRH radio
Lalo Kitang Mahal	Josefino Cenizal	Jose Padilla Jr., Arsenia Francisco, Corazon Rivas, Jose Romulo, Lopito, Carol Varga, Nello Nayo, Neonita Bona, Dadang Ortega, Jossie Celeste, Luis San Juan, Bobby Gonzales, Tony Cruz, Armando Ramos	People's Pictures	Drama	serialized over DZBC Radio and Manila Klasiks
Lo' Waist Gang	Pablo Santiago	Fernando Poe Jr., Corazon Rivas, Zaldy Zshornack, Berting Labra, Boy Francisco, Lani O. Padilla, Boy Sta. Romana, Wilma Zamora, Nello Nayo, Jose Garcia, Max Alvarado, Mario Antonio, Baby Zobel, Boy Planas, Boy Soriano, Juanito Rodriguez, Isa Rino, Luis San Juan, Bobby Gonzales, Tony Cruz	Larry Santiago Productions	Action	Directorial debut of Pablo Santiago
Luksang Tagumpay	Gregorio Fernandez	Jaime de la Rosa, Delia Razon, Rebecca del Rio, Eddie Rodriguez, Rudy Fernandez	LVN Pictures	Drama	first film appearance of then 3-year-old Rudy Fernandez Luksang Tagumpay won three major FAMAS awards in 1956 - Best Picture, Best Story (Mike Velarde) and Best Cinematography (Remigio Young).
Lydia	Armando Garces	Carmen Rosales, Rogelio de la Rosa, Paraluman, Precy Ortega, Boy Planas, Jose de Villa, Marcela Garcia, Apolonia Aguilar, Venchito Galvez, M. Ballesteros, Santiago Duenas, Lydia Correa, Amalia Fuentes (Miss Number 1), Juancho Gutierrez (Mr. Number 1)	Sampaguita Pictures	Comedy	
Mahirit, Masiplang Biyahing Bicol		Rudy Fernandez			
Margarita (Makasalanang Birhen)	Artemio Marquez	Pancho Magalona, Olivia Cenizal, Carol Varga, Elvira Reyes, Lily Marquez (Introducing)	People's Pictures, Premiere Productions Inc.	Drama	serialized in Bulaklak Magazine and over DZBC Radio
May Araw Ka Rin	Lou Salvador	Carlos Salazar, Cecilia Lopez, Rosa Rosal, Lou Salvador	LVN Pictures	Comedy	
Medalyong Perlas	Lamberto V. Avellana, F.H. Constantino, Gregorio Fernandez, Manuel Silos	Manding Claro, Mario Montenegro, Tessie Quintana, Nenita Vidal, Armando Goyena, Charito Solis, Jaime de la Rosa, Delia Razon, Nida Blanca, Nestor de Villa, Leroy Salvador, Carmencita Abad, Emma Alegre, Val Castelo, Eddie Gutierrez, Lita Gutierrez, Rosa Rosal	LVN Pictures	Drama	
Miss Tilapia	Mar S. Torres	Gloria Romero, Ric Rodrigo, Eddie Garcia, Susan Roces, Romeo Vasquez	Sampaguita Pictures	Comedy	serialized in Espesyal Komiks
Montalan Brothers	Artemio Marquez	Leopoldo Salcedo, Cesar Ramirez, Ben Perez, Tessie Quintana, Zaldy Zshornack, Bading Salcedo, Ramon d'Salva, Carol Varga, Lucas Paredes, Annie Sales, Belen Velasco, Luis San Juan, Cielito Legaspi, Max Alvarado	Larry Santiago Productions	Action	serialized in Bulaklak Magazine and DZBC Radio
Movie Fan	Tony Cayado	Amalia Fuentes, Juancho Gutierrez, Norma Vales, Susan Roces	Sampaguita Pictures	Comedy	serialized in Espesyal Komiks
Mr. & Mrs.	Gerardo de Leon	Tita Duran, Pancho Magalona, Lopito, Dely Atay-atayan, Africa de la Rosa, Ric Gutierrez, Teresita de Alba, Tony Dugan, Fernando Fernandez, Lo' Waist Gang, Eusebio Ramos	People's Pictures, Premiere Productions Inc.	Drama	dramatized over DZRH Radio
Mrs. Romulo		Max Alvarado, Ramon d'Salva, Justina David, Arsenia Francisco	Larry Santiago Productions	Action	
No Money No Honey	Lamberto V. Avellana	Jaime de la Rosa, Carmencita Abad, Florentino Ballecer, Oscar Obligacion, Joseph de Cordova, Jose Corazon de Jesus Jr., Vicenta Advincula, Neonita Bona, Carmen Soriano, Leonora Ruiz, Gerry Gabaldon, Sim Pajarillo, Ding Palacio	LVN Pictures	Comedy	serialized over DZBC Radio
Pagdating Ng Takip-Silim	Rosa Mia	Gloria Romero, Luis Gonzales, Barbara Perez, Tony Marzan	Sampaguita Pictures	Drama, Romance	serialized in Alimyon and Bulaklak Magazine
Pampanggenya	Jose de Villa	Rogelio de la Rosa, Linda Estrella, Rudy Francisco, Barbara Perez, Panchito, Nori Dalisay, Justina David, Ben Johnson, Vic Guevarra, Marcela Garcia, Apolonia Aguilar, Dolphy, Luis Gonzales	Sampaguita Pictures	Comedy	serialized in Liwayway magazine
Pitong Maria	Artemio Marquez	Anita Linda, Edna Luna, Olivia Cenizal, Danilo Montes, Carol Varga, Lydia Resma, Lydia Antonio, Baby Zobel, Amelita Sol, Lito Anzures, Abelardo Cortez (as Abelardo Cortes), Max Alvarado, Menggay	Larry Santiago Productions	Drama	serialized in Bulaklak Magazine and dramatized over DZBC Radio
Prince Charming	Conrado Conde	Boy Alano, Eddie Arenas, Aring Bautista, Imelda Concepcion, Myrna Delgado, Ric Rodrigo, Zeny Zabala	Sampaguita Pictures	Romance	
Prinsesa Ng Kagubatan	Ding M. De Jesus	Johnny Monteiro, Celia Fuentes, Teody Belarmino, Ruben Rustia, Joe Sison, Lito Anzures, Jaime Vargas, Roberto Dantes, Ric Bustamante, Mario Escudero, Elsa Gallego (Introducing)	Everlasting Pictures	Drama	
Prinsipe Villarba	Nemesio E. Caravana	Efren Reyes, Cynthia Zamora, Olivia Cenizal, Jose Romulo, Lauro Delgado, Ramon d'Salva, Melita de Leon (Introducing), Jose Garcia, Abraham Cruz, Paquito Salcedo, Sonia Reyes, Max Alvarado, Abelardo Cortez (as Abelardo Cortes), Amado Cortez (as Amado Cortes)	People's Pictures, Premiere Productions Inc.	Adventure	serialized in Liwayway Magazine and dramatized over DZRH Radio
Puppy Love	Manuel Silos	Nenita Vidal, Manding Claro, Nita Javier, Val Castelo, Naty Bernardo	LVN Pictures	Romance	
Rockin' The Cha-Cha		Tita Duran, Pancho Magalona		Musical	
Rodora	Mar S. Torres	Paraluman, Van de Leon, Amalia Fuentes, Juancho Gutierrez, Chichay, Cesar Reyes, Nori Dalisay, Justina David, Martin Marfil, Ven Medina, Romeo Vasquez, Meldy Corrales (Introducing)	Sampaguita Pictures	Drama	serialized in Pilipino Komiks
Saigon	Gerardo de Leon	Leopoldo Salcedo, Ben Perez, Cristina Pacheco, Khanh Ngoc	Lebran Productions	Drama	It has a supporting cast of 800,000 people
Santa Lucia	Teodorico C. Santos	Edna Luna, Arsenia Francisco, Eddie del Mar, Corazon Rivas, Jose Romulo, Carol Varga, Lauro Delgado, Ramon d'Salva, Ruben Rustia, Ligaya Lopez, Marissa Ibañez, Oscar Roncal, Renato Robles	People's Pictures	Drama	
Senyorita de Kampanilya	Jose de Villa	Rita Gomez, Ric Rodrigo, Eddie Arenas, Barbara Perez, Tito Garcia, Horacio Morelos, Herminia Carranza, Ben Johnson, Manolo Noble, Aring Bautista	Sampaguita Pictures	Comedy	serialized in Pilipino Komiks
Señorita	Tony Cayado	Gloria Romero, Ric Rodrigo, Amalia Fuentes, Juancho Gutierrez, Eddie Garcia	Sampaguita Pictures	Drama	
Simaron	Gerardo de Leon	Lilia Dizon, Johnny Monteiro, Celia Fuentes, Joe Sison, Bruno Punzalan, Vicente Liwanag, Ding Tello, Jaime Vargas, Roberto Dantes, Ric Bustamante	Everlasting Pictures	Action, Adventure, Swashbuckler	serialized in Alimyon and Bulaklak Magazines
Society Girl	Tony Cayado	Rita Gomez, Luis Gonzales, Rosa Mia, Aruray, Nelly Baylon, Panchito, Tito Galla	Sampaguita Pictures	Drama	serialized in Liwayway magazine
(Kahariang Bato) Tagani	Rolf Bayer	Andres Centenera, Myrna Mirasol, Bert Olivar, Bruno Punzalan, Cesar Ramirez, Jess Ramos, Alicia Vergel		Adventure	edited into Horror of the Blood Monsters (1970)
Takya	Artemio Marquez	Anita Linda, Jose Padilla Jr., Ramon d'Salva, Elvira Reyes, Abelardo Cortez (as Abelardo Cortes), Riño. Isa	Balatbat Productions, Premiere Productions	Comedy	serialized in Bulaklak Magazine
Taong Putik	Artemio B. Tecson (as Artemio Tecson)	Alicia Vergel, Amado Cortez, Ruben Rustia, Lani Oteyza, Corazon Noble, Vicente Liwanag	Everlasting Pictures	Horror	
Teresa	Mar S. Torres	Gloria Romero, Luis Gonzales, Dolphy, Norma Vales, Eddie Arenas, Tito Galla, Pacita Arana, Teroy de Guzman, Zeny Zabala	Sampaguita Pictures	Drama	
The Treasure of Gen. Yamashita	Rolf Bayer, Ho Chapman	Leopoldo Salcedo, Pancho Magalona, Lola Young, Mitsuko Mito, Danilo Montes, Vicente Liwanag, Quiel Liwanag ( as Exequiel Segovia)	Vista-Chapman Productions	Action	
Tumbando Caña	Olive La Torre	Lolita Rodriguez, Luis Gonzales, Rosa Mia, Norma Vales, Bella Flores, Aruray, Panchito, Etang Discher, Aring Bautista, Horacio Morelos, Herminia Carranza, Venchito Galvez, Leleng Isla, Marcela Garcia, Cora Maceda, Apolonia Aguilar, Lydia Correa, Maria Cristina	Sampaguita Pictures	Comedy	serialized in Tagalok Klasiks
Ulilang Bituin	Susana C. de Guzman	Mario Montenegro, Charito Solis, Rosa Aguirre	LVN Pictures	Drama, Romance	serialized in Alimyon and Bulaklak Magazine
Umaalong Ginto	Narciso S. Asistio	Jose Padilla Jr., Lilia Dizon, Rosita Noble, Carlos Padilla Jr., Gil de Leon, Jose Villafranca	National Pictures	Drama	
Vacacionista	Mar S. Torres	Gloria Romero, Luis Gonzales, Dolphy, Norma Vales, Daisy Romualdez, Etang Discher	Sampaguita Pictures	Comedy	popular, riotous "Ask Money Cha Cha" dance by duo Luis Gonzales and Dolphy
Via Dolorosa	Conrado Conde	Fred Montilla, Rita Gomez, Aruray, Bella Flores, Etang Discher, Rod Navarro	Sampaguita Pictures	Drama	serialized in Espesyal Komiks
Walang Panginoon	Gerardo de Leon	Cesar Ramirez, Celia Fuentes, Amado Cortez, Ruben Rustia, Letecia Ojera, Corazon Noble, Joe Sison, Lito Anzures, Elsa Gallego, Roberto Dantes, Ric Bustamante, SOS Daredevils, Vicente Liwanag, Lani Oteyza, Ofelia Diaz	Everlasting Pictures	Action	Alicia Vergel supposed to be a part of the cast
Welga		Armando Goyena	LVN Pictures	Drama	FAMAS rescinded Goyena's Best Actor nomination the day of the awards because FAMAS felt that his performance in one of the episodes (Medalyong Perlas) of the trilogy Welga (1956) was not enough to merit a Best Actor nomination.
1957
Aliping Maharlika	Ramon Estella	Cesar Ramirez, Celia Fuentes, Jess Ramos, Ruben Rustia, Norma Reyes, Merle Tuazon, Ely Nakpil, Mario Escudero, Bruno Punzalan, Blackie Francisco, Juan Caballes, Honesto Los Baños, Arthur Javier, SOS Daredevils, Betty Castillo	Everlasting Pictures	Action, Romance	
Ang Bahay Sa Bundok		Amado Cortez, Myrna Delgado	RPR	Drama	
Ate Barbara	Octavio Silos	Romeo Vasquez, Barbara Perez, Panchito, Precy Ortega, Boy Planas, Meldy Corrales, Venchito Galvez, Riño. Isa, Georgie Quizon, Matimtiman Cruz, Apolonio Rivera Jr.	Sampaguita Pictures	Comedy, Drama	
Bad Boy	Lou Salvador Sr.	Lou Salvador, Leroy Salvador, Luisa Montesa, Marita Zobel, Hector Reyes, Chona Sandoval, Rosa Aguirre, Joseph de Cordova, Arturo Moran, Jose Troni	LVN Pictures	Action	film debut of Marita Zobel
Badjao	Lamberto V. Avellana	Rosa Rosal, Tony Santos, Leroy Salvador, Joseph de Cordova, Vic Silayan, Oscar Keesee, Pedro Faustino, Arturo Moran, Tony Dantes, Gerry Gabaldon	LVN Pictures	Drama	
Bakasyon Grande	Pablo Santiago	Corazon Rivas, Fernando Poe Jr., Zaldy Zshornack, Berting Labra, Boy Francisco, Herminio "Butch" Bautista, Boy Sta. Romana, Mario Antonio, Bobby Gonzales, Tony Cruz, Paquito Toledo, Lily Marquez, Twins Darling, Ligaya Lopez	Larry Santiago Productions, Premiere Productions	Action, Comedy, Drama	
Bakya Mo Neneng	Gerardo de Leon	Edna Luna, Zaldy Zshornack, Leonor Vergara, Lopito, Bob Soler, Dolly Garcia, Renato Robles, Paquito Salcedo	People's Pictures	Drama	film debut of Bob Soler
Barumbado	Artemio Marquez	Zaldy Zshornack, Jose Romulo, Cynthia Zamora, Marissa Ibañez	People's Pictures	Action, Romance	Zaldy Zshornack's first leading role
Basta Ikaw	Manuel Conde	Emma Alegre, Carlos Padilla Jr., Charito de Leon, Roy Ruiz, Ike Jarlego Jr., Era Maravillas, Naty Bernardo, Greg Urbano, Ben Castillo, Miguel Lopez	LVN Pictures	Comedy, Drama, Romance	
Batang Bangkusay	Conrado Conde	Rita Gomez, Fred Montilla, Van de Leon, Nelly Baylon, Boy Alano, Manolo Noble, Horacio Morelos, Pablo Guevarra, Aring Bautista, Jamie Javier, Matimtiman Cruz	Sampaguita Pictures	Action	serialized in Pilipino Komiks
Bicol Express	Eddie Romero, Cirio H. Santiago, Efren Reyes, Teodorico C. Santos, Josefino Cenizal, Gerardo de Leon, Cesar Gallardo	Jose Romulo, Melita de Leon, Cielito de Leon, Zaldy Zshornack, Oscar Roncal, Dely Atay-Atayan, Tessie Quintana, Cesar Ramirez, Lauro Delgado, Jose Garcia, Max Alvarado, Tita Duran, Pancho Magalona, Abelardo Cortes, Abraham Cruz, Vic Diaz, Eddie Boy Serrano, Danilo Montes, Olivia Cenizal, Ramon d'Salva, Elvira Reyes, Aida Villegas, Dadang Ortega, Luis San Juan, Eddie del Mar, Edna Luna, Cynthia Zamora, Fernando Poe Jr., Marissa Ibañez, Leopoldo Salcedo, Alicia Vergel, Amado Cortez, Leonor Vergara, Lopito, Quiel Segovia, Efren Reyes, Carol Varga, Vicente Liwanag	Premiere Productions	Action, Drama	
Bituing Marikit	Carlos Vander Tolosa	Dolphy, Amalia Fuentes, Juancho Gutierrez, Daisy Romualdez, Rod Navarro, Etang Discher, Panchito, Pablo Raymundo, Priscilla Valdez, Ben Johnson, Pacita Arana, Jun Aristorenas	Sampaguita Pictures	Musical	
Colegiala	Tony Cayado	Gloria Romero, Luis Gonzales, Barbara Perez, Tony Marzan, Panchito Alba, Nori Dalisay, Meldy Corrales, Venchito Galvez, Manolo Noble, Pablo Guevarra, Aring Bautista, Marcela Garcia	Sampaguita Pictures	Drama	
Conde de Amor	Richard Abelardo	Val Castelo, Cecilia Lopez, Nita Javier, Alfonso Carvajal, Joseph de Cordova, Oscar Keesee, Jose Vergara, Willie Sotelo, Jose Corazon de Jesus Jr., Pamboy	LVN Pictures	Action, Swashbuckler	
Cuatro Vidas	Manuel Silos	Cecilia Lopez, Leroy Salvador, Nita Javier, Carlos Padilla Jr., Eddie Rodriguez, Alfonso Carvajal, Rebecca del Rio, Oscar Obligacion, Eusebio Gomez, Ludy Carmona	LVN Pictures	Romance	serialized in Hiwaga Komiks
Dalawang Ina	Susana C. de Guzman	Armando Goyena, Emma Alegre, Carmencita Abad, Milagros Naval, Vic Silayan	LVN Pictures	Drama	serialized in Liwayway Magazine
Diyosa	Conrado Conde	Rita Gomez, Ric Rodrigo, Etang Discher, Panchito, Tito Garcia, Nancy Carlos, Horacio Morelos, Cora Maceda, Lydia Correa, Matimtiman Cruz, Maria Ballesteros, Van de Leon	Sampaguita Pictures	Fantasy	serialized in Pilipino Komiks
El Robo	Manuel Conde	Armando Goyena, Delia Razon, Carlos Padilla Jr., Jose Vergara, Charito de Leon, Elena Balmori, Oscar Keesee, Eusebio Gomez, Dan Masinas, Jose Ramos, Ding Palacio, Cita Della, Sim Pajarillo, Pedro Pajarillo II, Demetrio Hernandez, Albert Jurado, Daniel Timog, Agustin Lopez, Eddie Pecson, Jose Vicencio, Isabel Neri, Julian Yulo	LVN Pictures	Action	serialized in Bulaklak Magazine
Espadang Umaangil	Nemesio E. Caravana	Efren Reyes, Olivia Cenizal, Lauro Delgado, Melita de Leon, Nello Nayo, Jose Garcia, Abraham Cruz, Abelardo Cortez, Boy Soriano	Premiere Productions	Action, Swashbuckler	
Eternally	Armando Garces	Gloria Romero, Juancho Gutierrez, Tony Marzan, Delia Marcos, Pacita Arana, Jun Aristorenas	Sampaguita Pictures	Romance	serialized in Espesyal Komiks
Familia Alvarado	Artemio Marquez	Leopoldo Salcedo, Tessie Quintana, Ben Perez, Jose Romulo, Cielito Legaspi, Max Alvarado, Bading Salcedo, Jess Villaflor, Elvira Reyes, Nello Nayo, Vic Diaz, Amado Cortez	Larry Santiago Productions	Action	
Flying Cadet	Jose Climaco (as Joe Climaco)	Jaime de la Rosa, Delia Razon, Rebecca del Rio, Willie Sotelo, Joseph de Cordova (as Jose de Cordova), Oscar Keesee, Oscar Obligacion, Arturo Moran	LVN Pictures	Drama	
Gabi At Araw	Octavio Silos	Ric Rodrigo, Lolita Rodriguez, Marlene Dauden, Eddie Garcia, Tolindoy, Aring Bautista, Ven Medina, Venchito Galvez, Leleng Isla, Lydia Correa	Sampaguita Pictures	Romance	serialized in Liwayway and Hiligaynon magazines
Guerero		Eddie del Mar, Arsenia Francisco	Premiere Productions	Action	
H-Line Gang	Candido Manahan	Fernando Poe Jr., Lani Oteyza, Berting Labra, Ligaya Lopez, Juliet Lozano, Lily Marquez, Leonor Vergara, Carmencita Ferrer, Myra Crisol, Josie Sarte, Josie Salcedo, Charito Perez, Abraham Cruz, Luis San Juan, Dely Atay-Atayan, Oscar Roncal, Menggay, Ben Balatbat, Lita Cristobal, Betty Apon	Premiere Productions	Comedy	
Hahabul-Habol	Rosa Mia	Dolphy, Amalia Fuentes, Juancho Gutierrez, Tito Galla, Etang Discher, Nori Dalisay, Horacio Morelos, Bert Olivar, Cora Maceda, Piedad Molina, Nelly Baylon	Sampaguita Pictures	Comedy, Romance	serialized in Bulaklak Magazine
Himagsik	Ding M. de Jesus	Johnny Monteiro, Tony Cruz Jr., Ruben Rustia, Teresita Mendez, Joe Sison, Lito Anzures, Mila Nieva, Ric Bustamante, SOS Daredevils	Everlasting Pictures	Action	
Hongkong Holiday	Mar S. Torres	Gloria Romero, Ric Rodrigo, Paraluman, Dolphy, Daisy Romualdez, Liza Ferrer, Aring Bautista, Tony Cayado	Golden City Film Production, Sampaguita Pictures	Comedy	
Hukom Roldan	Gregorio Fernandez	Jaime de la Rosa, Emma Alegre, Nenita Vidal, Alfonso Carvajal, Oscar Keesee, Nela Alvarez	LVN Pictures	Drama	
Isang Dakot Na Bigas		Rowena Moran, Fernando Poe Jr.			
Ismol Bat Teribol	Jose de Villa	Luis Gonzales, Amalia Fuentes, Nelly Baylon, Romeo Vasquez, Tony Marzan, Boy Planas, Nori Dalisay	Sampaguita Pictures	Comedy	
Kalibre .45	Cesar Gallardo	Efren Reyes, Danilo Montes, Edna Luna, Cynthia Zamora, Amado Cortez, Quiel Segovia, Leonor Vergara, Nello Nayo, Oscar Roncal, Boy Francisco, Max Alvarado	Premiere Productions	Action	serialized in Bulaklak Magazine
Kalyehera	Fred Daluz	Nida Blanca, Nestor de Villa, Milagros Naval, Lita Gutierrez, Ike Jarlego Jr., Rey Ruiz, Pianing Vidal, Vicenta Advincula, Sunday Contreras, Miniong Alvarez, Vicenta Fernandez, Gerry Gabaldon, Sim Pajarillo, Vic Cabrera, Jerry Reyes, Emiliano de Guzman, Mely Bucoy, Manuel Brioso	LVN Pictures	Comedy	
Kamay Ni Cain	Gerardo de Leon	Zaldy Zshornack, Edna Luna, Fernando Poe Jr., Leonor Vergara, Leticia Ojera, Nello Nayo, Berting Labra, Max Alvarado, Lily Marquez, Tony Palomer, Paquito Salcedo	People's Pictures	Drama	serialized in Pilipino Komiks
Kandilang Bakal	Consuelo P. Osorio	Jose Padilla Jr., Lilia Dizon, Reynaldo Dante, Patria Plata, Justina David, Joseph Estrada	Champion Pictures	Action	serialized in Espesyal Komiks
Kim	Ramon A. Estella	Efren Reyes, Eddie del Mar, Cynthia Zamora, Gigi Marriete, Renato Robles, Oscar Roncal, Ric Bustamante, Jess Lapid(as Jesus Lapid)	Cirio H. Santiago Film Organization	Drama	
Krisalis	Susana C. de Guzman	Jaime de la Rosa, Delia Razon, Nestor de Villa, Charito Solis, Rebecca del Rio, Nita Javier, Naty Bernardo	LVN Pictures	Drama	
Laki Sa Layaw	Nardo Vercudia	Celia Fuentes, Tony Cruz, Ruben Rustia, Teresita Mendez (as Teresa Mendez), Batotoy, Lito Anzures, Roberto Dantes, Maria Luisa, Mila Nieva, Jesse Medina	Everlasting Pictures	Musical	
Libre Comida	Candido Manahan	Danilo Montes, Olivia Cenizal, Corazon Rivas, Zaldy Zshornack, Ramon d'Salva, Vicente Liwanag, Amelita Sol, Elena Mayo, Belen Velasco, Luis San Juan, Fernando Santiago, Marissa Ibañez, Ligaya Lopez, Lily Marquez, Charito Garcia, Boy Sta. Romana, Butch Bautista, Peping Vicencio, Mel Rivera, Linda del Rosario	Balatbat Production	Musical	serialized in Liwayway magazine
Los Lacuacheros	Pablo Santiago	Fernando Poe Jr., Zaldy Zshornack, Berting Labra, Boy Francisco, Tony Cruz, Paquito Toledo, Butch Bautista, Boy Sta. Romana, Mario Antonio, Cielito Legaspi, Juliet Lozano, Nello Nayo, Paquito Salcedo, Jose Garcia, Lydia Antonio, Twins Darling	Larry Santiago Production	Comedy	
Maskara	Teodorico C. Santos	Alicia Vergel, Jose Velez, Carol Varga, Ramon d'Salva, Belen Velasco, Oscar Roncal, Renato Robles, Boy Soriano, Fernando Santiago, Max Alvarado	Premiere Production	Action	serialized in Bulaklak Magazine
Mga Anak Ng Diyos	Mar S. Torres, Armando Garces, Conrado Conde	Gloria Romero, Rita Gomez, Lolita Rodriguez, Van de Leon, Juancho Gutierrez, Susan Roces, Rosa Mia, Romeo Vasquez, Tony Marzan, Eddie Garcia	Sampaguita Pictures	Drama	serialized in Alimyon and Bulaklak Magazine
Mga Ligaw Na Bulaklak	Tony Cayado	Susan Roces, Romeo Vasquez, Daisy Romualdez, Tony Marzan, Eddie Garcia, Marlene Dauden, Nelly Baylon, Bella Flores, Martin Marfil, Bert Olivar, Nori Dalisay	Sampaguita Pictures	Drama	serialized in Pilipino Komiks
Nasaan Ka Irog	Joe Climaco	Mario Montenegro, Val Castelo, Lita Gutierrez, Letty Libo-on, Jose Corazon de Jesus, Elena Balmori, Priscilla Ramirez, Bentot, Fe Galvez	LVN Pictures	Drama	
Objective: Patayin Si Sec. Magsaysay	Mike Velarde	Jose Padilla Jr., Teddy Benavidez, Justina David, Gil de Leon, Arsenia Francisco, Rolando Liwanag, Dick Roque, Carlos Salazar, Oscar Moreno, Aida Cariño, Ruben Rustia, Artemio Tecson, Patria Plata, Ding Tello,	Champion Pictures	Drama	
Pabo Real	Nemesio E. Caravana	Pancho Magalona, Tessie Quintana, Cynthia Zamora, Lauro Delgado, Marissa Ibañez, Renato Robles, Ligaya Lopez, Leonor Vergara, Aida Villegas, Felisa Salcedo, Maria Marquez, Carmen Bernardino	People's Pictures	Drama	serialized in Liwayway magazine
Pasang Krus	Octavio Silos	Rita Gomez, Luis Gonzales, Rosa Mia, Tony Marzan, Justina David, Susan Roces, Romeo Vasquez, Zeny Zabala	Sampaguita Pictures	Drama	
Phone Pal	F.H. Constantino	Nenita Vidal, Manding Claro, Lita Gutierrez, Val Castelo, Luisa Montesa, Hector Reyes, Ben Delgado, Naty Bernardo, Bentot, Chiquito, Pedro Faustino	LVN Pictures	Comedy	
Pintor Kulapol	Rino Bermudez	Mario Montenegro, Cecilia Lopez, Arturo Moran, Ludy Carmona, Ding Palacio, Ched Bermudez, Jose Troni, Andres Iturbi, Miniong Alvarez, Carmen Soriano	LVN Pictures	Romance	
Pretty Boy	Armando Garces	Romeo Vasquez, Amalia Fuentes, Van de Leon, Rosa Mia, Rod Navarro, Zeny Zabala, Jose de Villa, Aring Bautista, Jose Villafranca, Georgie Quizon, Bert Olivar, Ben Johnson, Terry Campillo, Jun Aristorenas, Vic Guevarra	Sampaguita Pictures	Action	Adapted from the comics novel written by Celso Rodas and illustrated by Alfredo Alcala published in Hiwaga Komiks of Ace Publications in 1956-1957.
Prinsesa Gusgusin	Carlos Vander Tolosa	Susan Roces, Romeo Vasquez, Tito Galla, Nelly Baylon, Bella Flores, Zeny Zabala, Rod Navarro, Etang Discher, Nancy Carlos, Aring Bautista, Georgie Quizon, Jose de Villa, Bert Olivar	Sampaguita Pictures	Romance	serialized in Espesyal Komiks
Prinsipe Alejandre at Don Luis	Nemesio E. Caravana	Efren Reyes, Olivia Cenizal, Carol Varga, Lauro Delgado, Melita de Leon, Jose Velez, Jose Garcia, Lily Marquez, Mario Taguibulos, Resty Sandel, Phillip Santos, Carpi Asturias, Myra Crisol, Tony Bobong, Lita Cristobal, Carolina Herranz, SOS Boys	Premiere Productions	Action, Swashbuckler	serialized in Liwayway magazine
Pusakal	Cirio H. Santiago	Zaldy Zshornack, Cynthia Zamora, Lauro Delgado, Leonor Vergara, Oscar Roncal, Jose Garcia, Max Alvarado, Larry Ramos	People's Pictures	Action	
Reyna Sirkera	Felix Villar	Celia Fuentes, Eddie del Mar, Tony Cruz Jr., Teresa Mendez	Everlasting Pictures	Drama	
Rubi-Rosa	Mar S. Torres	Rita Gomez, Ric Rodrigo, Carlos Salazar, Riño. Isa, Horacio Morelos, Venchito Galvez, Nancy Carlos, Georgie Quizon, Pepe Salameda	Sampaguita Pictures	Drama	serialized in Pilipino Komiks
Sampung Libong Pisong Pag-ibig	Gregorio Fernandez	Charito Solis, Eddie Rodriguez, Luisa Montesa, Oscar Keesee, Bayani Casimiro, Ludy Carmona, Joseph Estrada (as Jose Ejercito)	LVN Pictures	Drama	
Sanga-Sangang Puso	Susana C. de Guzman	Armando Goyena, Rosa Rosal, Charito Solis, Rosa Aguirre, Milagros Naval, Eddie Rodriguez, Jose Vergara, Nieves Manuel, Miguel Lopez, Loida Morales, Vicente Alberto	LVN Pictures	Drama	
Sebya, Mahal Kita	F.H. Constantino	Nida Blanca, Nestor de Villa, Pugo, Lita Gutierrez, Val Castelo, Rosa Aguirre, Bentot, Pianing Vidal, Ike Jarlego Jr., Jose Corazon de Jesus Jr., Fidela Magpayo	LVN Pictures	Comedy, Romance	dramatized over DZXL radio
Si Meyor Naman	F.H. Constantino	Armando Goyena, Luisa Montesa, Lita Gutierrez, Pugo, Perla Bautista, Alfonso Carvajal	LVN Pictures	Drama	
Sino ang Maysala?	Armando Garces	Rogelio de la Rosa, Gloria Romero, Paraluman, Ric Rodrigo, Lolita Rodriguez, Luis Gonzales, Rosa Mia, Susan Roces, Romeo Vasquez, Van de Leon, Etang Discher, Zeny Zabala, Bella Flores, Eddie Garcia	Sampaguita Pictures	Drama	Inspired by Nicholas Ray's Knock on Any Door Serialized in Alimyon and Bulaklak Magazines
Sonata	Tony Cayado	Paraluman, Amalia Fuentes, Juancho Gutierrez, Tony Cayado, Ven Medina, Precy Ortega	Sampaguita Pictures	Musical	Serialized in Alimyon and Bulaklak Magazines
Student Canteen	Pablo Santiago	Fernando Poe Jr., Corazon Rivas, Lopito, Myra Crisol, Paquito Toledo, Elvira Reyes, the Reycard Duet	Larry Santiago Productions, Premiere Productions	Drama	telecast over CBN television network
Sweethearts	Gerardo de Leon	Zaldy Zshornack, Lisa Gaye, Jose Romulo, Corazon Rivas, Lopito, Shirley Gorospe	Cirio H. Santiago Film Organization, People's Pictures	Romance	filmed in Hollywood and Philippines
Taga sa Bato	Conrado Conde	Paraluman, Lolita Rodriguez, Luis Gonzales, Van de Leon, Eddie Garcia	Sampaguita Pictures	Action	serialized in Espesyal Komiks
Tarhata	Armando Garces	Fred Montilla, Ramon Revilla, Van de Leon, Barbara Perez, Lolita Rodriguez, Eddie Garcia, Martin Marfil, Jaime Javier, Leleng Isla, Vic Guevarra, Pepe Salameda, Pablo Raymundo, Cora Maceda, Cesar Reyes, Pablo Guevarra	Sampaguita Pictures	Drama, Fantasy	
Tingnan Natin	Manuel Conde	Nida Blanca, Nestor de Villa, Emma Alegre, Carlos Padilla Jr., Jose Vergara, Charito de Leon	LVN Pictures	Romance	
Tipin	Efren Reyes	Fernando Poe Jr., Lani Oteyza, Shirley Gorospe, Jose Velez, Berting Labra, Ricardo 'Boy' Francisco, Elvira Reyes, Lily Marquez, Jose Garcia, Ligaya Lopez	People's Pictures	Comedy	based on the comic strip by Larry Alcala which was serialized in Hiwaga Komiks
Tiririt Ng Ibon	Lou Salvador Sr.	Charito Solis, Leroy Salvador, Lou Salvador Sr., Val Castelo	LVN Pictures	Comedy, Musical, Romance	
Tokyo 1960	Teodorico C. Santos	Tessie Quintana, Eddie del Mar, Zaldy Zshornack	Cirio H. Santiago Film Organization, People's Pictures	Sci-Fi	Tokyo 1960" (1957) was one of the few so-called Pinoy sci-fi 'atomic monster' movies that came out in the 50s. Three other of this gene were also released - "Taong Putik" (1956), "Tuko sa Madre Kakaw" (1959), "Anak ng Bulkan" (1959).
Topo Topo	H.B. Katindig	Delia Razon, Mario Montenegro, Carmencita Abad, Val Castelo, Willie Sotelo, Naty Bernardo, Elena Balmori	LVN Pictures	Comedy	serialized in Liwayway magazine
Torkwata	Rosa Mia	Susan Roces, Eddie Arenas, Aruray, Zeny Zabala, Tito Galla, Precy Ortega, Marilou Cuadrado	Sampaguita Pictures	Comedy, Romance	serialized in Hiwaga Komiks
Troop 11	Tony Santos	Nenita Vidal, Manding Claro, Pugo, Lou Salvador Jr., Chona Sandoval, Vic Silayan, Hector Reyes, Ludy Carmona, Ike Jarlego Jr., Lito Carmelo	LVN Pictures	Comedy	
Turista	F.H. Constantino	Nida Blanca, Nestor de Villa, Bimbo Danao, Atsuko Kindaichi, Rebecca del Río, Bayani Casimiro, Luisa Montesa, Jaime de la Rosa, Delia Razon, Charito Solis, Jun Aristorenas	LVN Pictures	Comedy, Romance	filmed on location in Tokyo, Japan
Ukelele Boy	Pablo Santiago	Zaldy Zshornack, Lani Oteyza, Anita Linda, Ben Perez, Berting Labra, Vic Diaz, Jose Garcia, Abraham Cruz, Luis San Juan, Manuel Barbeyto, the Reycard Duet	Larry Santiago Productions, Premiere Productions	Action, Drama	dramatized over DZMY radio
Veronica	Mar S. Torres	Rogelio de la Rosa, Paraluman, Lolita Rodriguez, Panchito, Tolindoy, Aring Bautista, Ven Medina, Venchito Galvez, Priscilla Valdez, Pablo Raymundo, Lydia Correa, Nenita Navarro, Apolonia Aguilar, Aida Villegas	Sampaguita Pictures	Drama	
Viva Las Senoritas		Amado Cortez, Celia Fuentes, Anita Linda, Lani Oteyza	Everlasting Pictures	Comedy	
Wala Nang Luha	Cesar Gallardo	Danilo Montes, Corazon Rivas, Jose Romulo, Cynthia Zamora, Amado Cortez, Elvira Reyes, Vicente Liwanag, Nello Nayo, Rubi Rojas, Dadang Ortega, Juling Bagabaldo, Aida Villegas	People's Pictures	Drama	dramatized over DZRH, DYRC, DXAW Radio
Walang Sugat	Lamberto V. Avellana	Mario Montenegro, Charito Solis, Tony Santos, Vic Silayan, Joseph de Cordova (as Jose de Cordova), Oscar Keesee, Jose Vergara, Arturo Moran, Rosa Aguirre, Fe Galvez, Tony Dantes, Miguel Anzures	LVN Pictures	Drama	based on the popular play by Severino Reyes
Yaya Maria	Larry Santiago	Amado Cortez, Ramon d'Salva, Tita Duran, Tessie Quintana, Carol Varga, Zaldy Zshornack	Premiere Productions	Drama	
1958
4 Na Pulubi	Pablo Santiago	Leopoldo Salcedo, Jose Romulo, Tony Santos, Amado Cortez, Myrna Delgado, Max Alvarado, Chiquito, Rafael Jimenez, Luis San Juan, Francisco Cruz, Tony Cruz, Ramon d'Salva, Corazon Rivas, Myra Crisol, Teresita Mendez	Larry Santiago Productions	Comedy	
Ako Ang Maysala	Armando Garces	Amalia Fuentes, Romeo Vasquez, Rosa Mia, Van de Leon, Greg Martin	Vera-Perez Productions	Drama	Teen sensation Romeo Vasquez played a juvenile delinquent in the movie, for which he won the Golden Harvest Award for Best Actor.
Alaala Kita	Armando Garces	Luis Gonzales	Sampaguita Pictures	Romance	
Alaalang Banal	Armando Garces	Gloria Romero, Luis Gonzales, Marlene Dauden, Carlos Salazar, Rosa Mia, Tony Cayado	Vera-Perez Productions	Drama, Romance	dramatized over DZRH radio
Alamid		Celia Fuentes			
Alembong	Fred Daluz	Leroy Salvador, Lita Gutierrez, Linda Roxas, Rey Ruiz, Oscar Obligacion, Ben Cosca, Nieves Manuel, Mario Roldan, Lucita Soriano, Menggay, The Reycards Duet	LVN Pictures	Drama	
Ana Maria	Gregorio Fernandez	Charito Solis, Eddie Rodriguez, Perla Bautista, Ronnie Villamor, Luz Valdez, Vic Diaz, Bobby Villar, Ramon Vargas, Chito Villacorta	LVN Pictures	Drama	
Anak Ng Lasengga	Cesar Gallardo	Alicia Vergel, Edna Luna, Zaldy Zshornack, Lopito, Belen Velasco, Nello Nayo, Lily Marqueez, Abraham Cruz, Francisco Cruz, Paquito Salcedo, Bino Garcia, Mariano Tolentino, Felisa Salcedo, Carlos Badion	People's Pictures	Drama	serialized in Liwayway magazine
Anak Ni Waray	F.H. Constantino	Nida Blanca, Nestor de Villa, Lita Gutierrez, Bernard Bonnin, Perla Bautista, Caridad Sanchez, Miguel Lopez, Ding Royo, Boy Planas, Baby Janet, Leroy Salvador, Pianing Vidal, Juling Bagabaldo, Andres Iturbi, Tino Lapuz	LVN Pictures	Comedy	Sequel of Handang Matodas (1956)
Ang Lo'waist Gang At Si Og Sa Mindoro	Pablo Santiago	Jess "Og" Ramos, Fernando Poe Jr., Teresita Mendez, Berting Labra, Boy Francisco, Bobby Gonzales, Paquito Toledo, Tony Cruz, Butch Bautista, Boy Sta. Romana, Mario Antonio, Chiquito, Rafael Jimenez, Elizabeth Ramsey, Nello Nayo, Luis San Juan, Dencio Padilla, Raul Ramos, Concio Calma, Bino Garcia, Teddy Santos, Primo Yumul, Romeo Mendoza, Bert Magallona, Rino Garcia, Rosauro Oracion, SOS Daredevils	Larry Santiago Productions	Action, Comedy	Followed by a sequel Lo' Waist Gang Joins The Army (1960)
Ang Nobya Kong Igorota	Consuelo P. Osorio	Chichay, Amado Cortez, Elvira Reyes, Mary Walter	Champion Pictures	Comedy	
Anino Ni Bathala	Conrado Conde	Paraluman, Ric Rodrigo, Marlene Dauden, Eddie Garcia, Aring Bautista, Matimtiman Cruz, Bella Flores, Jose Villafranca	Sampaguita Pictures	Drama	serialized in Pilipino Komiks
Atrebida	Armando de Guzman	Myra Crisol, Fernando Poe Jr., Lani Oteyza, Chiquito, Paquito Toledo, Jose Garcia, Dolly Garcia, Nello Nayo, Luis San Juan, Sisters Canda, Tony Cruz, Twins Darling, Al Quinn, Lita Cristobal, Tony Villegas, Liza Soriano, Teddy Santos, Piedad Molina, Lilian Campos, Ben Balatbat, Sack Dress Gang and their Sidekicks	Premiere Productions	Comedy	
Austerity Love	F.H. Constantino	Nestor de Villa, Luisa Montesa, Willie Sotelo, Letty Liboon	LVN Pictures	Comedy, Romance	first film of Nestor de Villa and Aruray as a love team
Ay Pepita!	Susana C. de Guzman	Mario Montenegro, Nita Javier, Manding Claro, Milagros Naval, Ric Mojica, Bernard Bonnin, Arturo Moran, Luz Valdez, The Lovers Trio, Diomedes Maturan, Miniong Alvarez	LVN Pictures	Drama, Romance	Film debut of Luz Valdez. Serialized in Aliwan Magazine
Baby Bubut	Rosa Mia	Amalia Fuentes, Juancho Gutierrez, Tito Galla, Rod Navarro, Meldy Corrales, Etang Discher (guest star), Matimtiman Cruz, Nori Dalisay	Sampaguita Pictures	Comedy	serialized in Tagalog Klasiks
Balae	H.B. Catindig	Delia Razon, Mario Montenegro, Hector Reyes, Chona Sandoval, Ric Mojica, Lina Prieto, Guy Donato, Miniong Alvarez, Manding Claro, Nenita Vidal, Elena Balmori	LVN Pictures	Comedy	
Balaraw		Anita Linda		Drama	
Barkada	Lou Salvador Sr.	Lou Salvador Jr., Marita Zobel, Hector Reyes, Chona Sandoval, Ike Jarlego Jr., Joseph de Cordova, Oscar Keesee, Arturo Moran, Bebong Osorio, Ding Royo, Bobby Villar, Mina Reyes	LVN Pictures	Action, Drama	
Batang-Piyer	Nemesio E. Caravana	Zaldy Zshornack, Lani Oteyza, Melita de Leon, Lauro Delgado	People's Pictures	Action	
Batas Ng Puso	Larry Santiago	Tessie Quintana, Tony Santos, Corazon Rivas, Joseph Estrada, Elvira Reyes, Ramon d'Salva, Patria Plata, Abraham Cruz, Menggay, Luis San Juan, Dely Villanueva, Raul Ramos, Carlos Mauri	Larry Santiago Productions	Drama, Romance	
Be My Love	Cesar Gallardo	Pancho Magalona, Shirley Gorospe, Lopito, Vicente Liwanag, Chiquito, Lerrie Pangilinan, Diomedes Maturan, Joseph Mike, Romy Katindig	People's Pictures	Comedy, Romance	
Beloved	Tony Cayado	Gloria Romero, Ric Rodrigo, Tito Galla, Priscilla Valdez, Venchito Galvez	Sampaguita Pictures	Drama, Romance	
Berdaderong Ginto	Mar S. Torres	Ric Rodrigo, Barbara Perez, Marlene Dauden, Greg Martin, Eddie Garcia, Etang Discher, Zeny Zabala	Vera-Perez Productions	Drama, Romance	serialized in Tagalog Klasiks
Bobby	Mar S. Torres	Romeo Vasquez, Fred Montilla, Paraluman, Amalia Fuentes, Tito Galla, Meldy Corrales, Rod Navarro, Ven Medina, Nenita Navarro, Bert Olivar, Pablo Guevarra, Hector Mallares, Marcela Garcia, Etang Discher	Vera-Perez Productions, Sampaguita Pictures	Drama	serialized in Pilipino Komiks
Bon Voyage	Cesar Gallardo	Fernando Poe Jr., Lani Oteyza, Leonor Vergara, Bob Soler, Eddie Mesa, Lopito, Jose Romulo, Lily Marquez, Lauro Delgado, Tessie Quintana, Johnny Monteiro, Cielito Legaspi	Premiere Productions	Drama	
Casa Grande	Manuel Conde, Gregorio Fernandez, F.H. Constantino	Armando Goyena, Mario Montenegro, Carmencita Abad, Nita Javier, Carlos Padilla Jr., Linda Roxas, Jose Vergara, Rosa Aguirre, Pedro Faustino, Levi Celerio, Miniong Alvarez, Perla Bautista, Manuel Conde, Eusebio Gomez, Pianing Vidal, Agnes Ravel Charito Solis, Leroy Salvador, Eddie Rodriguez, Lou Salvador Jr., Marita Zobel, Guy Donato, Alfonso Carvajal, Johnny Reyes, Joseph de Cordova, Vic Diaz, Nida Blanca, Nestor de Villa, Pugo, Manding Claro, Val Castelo, Lita Gutierrez, Willie Sotelo, Hector Reyes, Letty Liboon, Mary Walter, The Reycards Duet	LVN Pictures	Drama, Musical	A film with three different stories. The first story is titled "Herederos", second story is titled "Gerilyang Patpat" while the third story is titled "Bording Haus" with their corresponding director and casts listed respectively.
Combo Festival	Manuel Silos	Lou Salvador Jr., Pugo, Hector Reyes, Chona Sandoval, Luz Valdez, Ronnie Villamor, Oscar Keesee, Naty Bernardo, Noel Villaroman, Robert Campos	LVN Pictures	Musical	
Condenado	Armando Garces	Lolita Rodriguez, Luis Gonzales, Van de Leon, Eddie Garcia, Martin Marfil, Totoy Torrente, Pablo Guevarra, Precy Ortega, Apolonio Rivera Jr., Miriam Hurado, Ronald Remy	Sampaguita Pictures	Action	serialized in Pilipino Komiks
Dewey Boulevard	Rosa Mia	Gloria Romero, Ric Rodrigo, Dolphy, Juancho Gutierrez, Barbara Perez, Marlene Dauden, Tony Marzan, Rosita Noble, Ven Medina, Nenita Navarro, Aring Bautista, Hector Mallares, Jamie Javier	Sampaguita Pictures	Drama	
Eddie, Junior Detective	Tony Santos	Manding Claro, Eddie Rodriguez, Linda Roxas, Ramon Yulo, Jose Corazon de Jesus Jr., Vic Diaz, Perla Bautista, Cita Della, Bebong Osorio, Norma Ledesma, Miguel Lopez, Geisha	LVN Pictures	Detective Mystery	
Elephant Girl	Eddie Infante	Teody Belarmino, Eddie Infante, Paraluman	Shaw and Sons	Comedy	
Faithful	Lamberto V. Avellana	Jaime de la Rosa, Rosa Rosal, Lou Salvador Jr., Marita Zobel, Rosa Aguirre, Oscar Keesee, Nena Palma, Bobby Villar, Vic Garcia, Bert del Rosario, Nanding Roces	LVN Pictures	Drama	
Fighting Tisoy	Pablo Santiago	Zaldy Zshornack, Myra Crisol, Ben Perez, Elvira Reyes, Chiquito, Bobby Gonzales, Luis San Juan, Larry Ramos, Dencio Padilla, Fernando Santiago, Menchi Ferrer, Ligaya Reyes, Mila Bernardo, Ramon d'Salva	Larry Santiago Productions	Drama	
Glory At Dawn (Lualhati Sa Umaga)	Gil de Leon	Pancho Magalona, Lilia Dizon, Martin Marfil, Max Alvarado, Flor Bien, Blackie Francisco, Rosauro Oracion, Doming del Valle, Aruray, Tembong, Tony Dungan, Boy Osin, A. Dagumboy, Loretta de Lara, Vicky Serrano, Linda Lopez, Leon Timog, Ric Perez, Shirley Rodriguez, Quiel Mendoza, Lourdes Lozano (Introducing), Ernesto Santos (Introducing)	Pacific Movie Productions, Inc.	Drama	directorial debut of Gil de Leon
Hanggang Sa Dulo Ng Daigdig	Gerardo de Leon	Pancho Magalona, Mona Fernandez (first leading role), Ben Perez, Gil de Leon, Shirley Rodriguez, Loretta de Lara (Introducing), Max Alvarado, Flor Bien, Resty Sandel, Justina David, Blackie Francisco, Bino Garcia, Quiel Mendoza, Helen Nazario, Alex de Leon, Doming del Valle, Tony Nieto, Mercy Guia, Martin Marfil	Pacific Movie Productions, Inc.	Drama	The film won six FAMAS Awards in 1958 - Best Picture, Best Director (Gerardo de Leon), Best Actor (Pancho Magalona), Best Screenplay (Cesar Amigo), Best Cinematography (Jose Pagsisihan) and Best Editing (Fely Cristostomo)
Hindi Binyagan	Felix Villar	Celia Fuentes, Jess Ramos, Tony Cruz Jr., Norma Reyes, Jerry Lopez, Rosanna Recto, Jess Medina, Mario Escudero, Johnny Long, Mina Yulo, Jose de Castro	Everlasting Pictures	Action	
Hiwaga Ng Pag-ibig (Saing-Saingan)	Natoy B. Catindig	Val Castelo, Lita Gutierrez, Pugo, Johnny Reyes, Rosa Aguirre, Ludy Carmona, Caridad Sanchez, Perla Bautista, Levi Celerio, Ramon Olmos	LVN Pictures	Romance	serialized in Liwayway Magazine
Impyerno Sa Paraiso		Carmencita Abad, Lito Anzures, Teody Belarmino, Eddie del Mar	Everlasting Pictures	Drama	
Jeepney Rock		Max Alvarado, Guillermo Carls	Spotlight	Comedy	
Kastilaloy	F.H. Constantino	Nida Blanca, Armando Goyena, Val Castelo, Luisa Montesa, Pugo, Elena Balmori, Vic Diaz, Jose Troni, Mary Walter, Loida Morales	LVN Pictures	Comedy	
Kilabot Sa Sta. Barbara	Mario Barri	Irene Worrell, Rocky Rogers, Vic Diaz, Joe Sison, Bert Olivar, Bruno Punzalan, Andres Centenera, Sonia Reyes, Pedro Faustino, Flor Bien, Vicente Liwanag, Dely Atay-Atayan, Antonio de la Moguies, Colin Halal, Roberto Donato, Tony Samonte, Katherine Hotchkiss	Tamaraw Productions	Action	
Korona At Pag-ibig	Nemesio E. Caravana	Efren Reyes, Johnny Monteiro, Cynthia Zamora, Lopito, Melita de Leon, Nello Nayo, Jose Garcia, Abraham Cruz, Max Alvarado, Rogelio Moreno, Ruby Rojas, Mario Escudero, Guillermo Carls, Resty Sandel, Carpi Asturias, Luz del Fierro, Nina Bonita, Linda Ibanez, Jess Lapid, Henry Rivera, Dencio Padilla, Bino Garcia, SOS Daredevils, Lita Cristobal, Belcy Martinez, Lilia Duran	Premiere Productions	Swashbuckler	serialized in Liwayway magazine
Kundiman Ng Puso	Tony Cayado	Lolita Rodriguez, Eddie Arenas, Tony Marzan, Marlene Dauden, Rod Navarro, Nori Dalisay, Pacita Arana	Sampaguita Pictures	Romance	serialized in Liwayway magazine
Kurangga	Felix Villar	Tessie Quintana, Jesus "Og" Ramos, Ramon d'Salva, Bruno Punzalan, Ric Bustamante, Ely Nakpil, SOS Daredevils	Cinematic Philippines Inc.	Adventure	
Laban Sa Lahat	Cirio H. Santiago	Fernando Poe Jr., Leonor Vergara, Lauro Delgado, Oscar Roncal, Elvira Reyes, Belen Velasco, Bruno Punzalan, Jose Garcia, Francisco Cruz, Dencio Padilla, Bino Garcia, Paquito Diaz, Jesus Lapid	Premiere Productions	Action	serialized in Liwayway magazine
Limang Dalangin	Susana C. de Guzman	Nida Blanca, Charito Solis, Nita Javier, Lita Gutierrez, Marita Zobel, Diomedes Maturan, Bernard Bonnin, Tito Garcia, Danny Villanueva, Noli Arroyo, Guy Donato, Marilou Torres	LVN Pictures	Drama	serialized in Aliwan magazine
Lover Boy	Carlos Vander Tolosa	Romeo Vasquez, Susan Roces, Jose Mari, Liberty Ilagan, Pacita Arana, Etang Discher, Venchito Galvez, Rino Isa, Rod Navarro, Boy Planas, The Wing Duo	Sampaguita Pictures	Romance	
Lutong Makaw	Pablo Santiago	Fernando Poe Jr., Corazon Rivas, Myra Crisol, Berting Labra, Boy Francisco, Paquito Toledo, Tony Cruz, Butch Bautista, Boy Sta. Romana, Mario Antonio, Tito "Chiquito" Pangan	Larry Santiago Productions, Asia Films Ltd.	Comedy	
Madaling Araw	Armando Garces	Amalia Fuentes, Juancho Gutierrez, Susan Roces, Romeo Vasquez, Rosa Mia, Tito Galla, Carlos Salazar, Teddy Benavidez, Meldy Corrales, Elsa Oria	Sampaguita Pictures	Musical	
Malvarosa	Gregorio Fernandez	Charito Solis, Leroy Salvador, Carlos Padilla Jr., Eddie Rodriguez, Rebecca del Rio, Vic Silayan, Vic Diaz, Rey Ruiz, Linda Roxas, Johnny Reyes, Priscilla Ramirez, Ramon Olmos, Nita Ramos, Johnny Legarda, Levi Celerio, Caridad Sanchez, Perla Bautista, Segundo Maniquiz	LVN Pictures	Crime, Drama	Serialized in Espesyal Komiks. Caridad Sanchez landed a role, replacing Rosa Rosal who was pregnant at that time. The film won the best supporting actress award for Rebecca del Rio at the 1958 Asian Film Festival.
Man On The Run (The Kidnappers, US)	Eddie Romero	Burgess Meredith, Olivia Cenizal, William Phipps, Paul Harber, Carol Varga, Amado Cortez, Zaldy Zshornack, Johnny Monteiro, Theodore Bikel	Cirio H. Santiago Film Organization, Halcyon Productions	Drama	The film was renamed The Kidnappers when it was released in the US. The original title should have been "Blaze of Night" and an article about the production filming titled "Looking in on a Filipino Production" written by Clifford Harrington was published in American Cinematographer in February, 1958. The film casts include Hollywood actors Burgess Meredith, William Phipps, Paul Harber and Theodore Bikel and prominently features the city of Manila produced by Cirio H. Santiago Film Organization and with international release by Halcyon Productions. The film showcased some familiar landmarks like Tutuban Railroad Station, the Central Market, Dewey (now Roxas ) Boulevard, Manila Hotel and the ruins of the Walled City of Intramuros among others.
Mapait Na Lihim	Octavio Silos	Ric Rodrigo, Lolita Rodriguez, Van de Leon, Marlene Dauden, Etang Discher	Sampaguita Pictures	Drama	
Maria Kondende		Anita Linda			
Marta Soler		Cynthia Zamora, Ramon d'Salva, Carol Varga	Premiere Productions		
Matandang Tinale	Artemio Marquez	Leopoldo Salcedo, Anita Linda, Lopito, Myra Crisol, Joseph Estrada (Introducing), Bobby Gonzales, Eddie Suisa, H-Fi Twins, Boy Sta. Romana, Leonora Ruiz, Francisco Cruz, Prospero Luna	Larry Santiago Productions	Comedy	
Matira Ang Matibay	Alex Sunga	Cesar Ramirez, Quiel Segovia, Ramon d'Salva, Joe Sison, Mario Barri, Martin Marfil, Bert Olivar, Ding Tello, Flor Bien, Vicente Liwanag, Pedro Faustino, Irene Worrell, Rocky Rogers	Tamaraw Pictures	Action	
May Pasikat Ba Sa Kano	Nemesio E. Caravana	Fernando Poe Jr., Leonor Vergara, Chiquito, Ramon d'Salva, Lily Marquez, Menggay, Jose Garcia	Premiere Productions, Inc.	Drama, Sport	serialized in Liwayway magazine
Mga Kuwento ni Lola Basyang	Conrado Conde	Dolphy, Barbara Perez, Rod Navarro, Carlos Salazar, Marlene Dauden, Eddie Garcia, Rosa Mia, Tony Marzan, Priscilla Valdez, Gloria Romero, Juancho Gutierrez	Sampaguita Pictures	Family, Fantasy	
Mga Liham kay Tiya Dely	Pablo Santiago, Armando V. de Guzman, Felix Villar, Artemio Marquez, Larry Santiago	Corazon Rivas, Ben Perez, Luis San Juan, Black Sheep(The New Gang), Cielito Legaspi, Chiquito, Renato Robles, Max Alvarado, Francisco Cruz, Bino Garcia, Alex de Leon, Lopito, Patsy, Myra Crisol, Paquito Toledo, Bobby Gonzales, Elizabeth Ramsey, Tony Cruz, Effy Aquino, The Rocketeers, The Splatters, Jose Romulo, Myrna Delgado, Ramon d'Salva, Ligaya Lopez, Leopoldo Salcedo, Anita Linda, Carol Varga, Menggay, Dadang Ortega, Aida Villegas, Vic Inza	Larry Santiago Productions	Drama	based on CBN top rating radio program
Mga Reyna Ng Vicks	Mar S. Torres	Gloria Romero, Rita Gomez, Amalia Fuentes, Susan Roces, Ric Rodrigo, Luis Gonzales, Juancho Gutierrez, Romeo Vasquez, Dolphy, Nelly Baylon, Pacita Arana, Terry Campillo, Maria Ballesteros, Eddie Garcia, Leleng Isla, Sabas San Juan, Etang Discher, Bella Flores, Zeny Zabala, Precy Ortega, Boy Planas, Lilibeth Vera-Perez, Horacio Morelos, Venchito Galvez, Herminia Carranza, Nenita Navarro, Marcela Garcia, Santiago Dueñas, Hector Mallares, Eddie Mallares, Pilar Chico, Rosa Mia, Ven Medina, Justina David, Totoy Torrente, Pepe Salameda	Sampaguita Pictures	Comedy, Romance	dramatized over DZRH radio
Mr. Basketball	Cesar Gallardo	Bob Soler, Edna Luna, Jose Romulo, Cielito Legaspi, Carlos Badion(Introducing Mr. Basketball 1957), Chiquito, Mariano Tolentino, Ramon Manulat, Ramchand Motoomull, Paquito Diaz, Nap Flores, Francisco Lacarejos, Mario Ballesteros, Kurt Bachmann, Constancio Ortiz	People's Pictures, Inc.	Sport	first lead role for Bob Soler first film to feature the nation's greatest basketball stars
Mr. Kuripot	Fred Daluz	Leroy Salvador, Lita Gutierrez, Linda Roxas, Rey Ruiz, Bentot, Oscar Obligacion, Rebecca del Río, Pugo	LVN Pictures	Comedy	
My Little Kuwan (Sebya, Mahal Kita)	Fred Daluz	Pugo, Sylvia La Torre, Eddie San Jose, Rosa Aguirre, Bentot, Nelda Lopez Navarro (Introducing), Agnes Ravel	LVN Pictures	Comedy	the film was based on CBN's hit radio drama program "Sebya, Mahal Kita" aired over DZXL radio
Obra Maestra	Teodorico C. Santos, Cesar Gallardo, Danilo Santiago, Gerardo de Leon, Efren Reyes	Tessie Quintana, Eddie del Mar, Fernando Poe Jr., Leopoldo Salcedo, Jose Padilla Jr., Alicia Vergel, Edna Luna, Cynthia Zamora, Jose Romulo, Danilo Delgado, Quiel Segovia, Lani Oteyza, Vicente Liwanag, Chiquito, Elvira Reyes, Eddie Boy Serrano, Zaldy Zshornack, Shirley Gorospe, Lopito, Vic Diaz, Eddie Mesa, Anita Linda, Efren Reyes, Olivia Cenizal, Johnny Monteiro, Carol Varga	People's Pictures, Inc.	Drama	
Pagoda	Eduardo de Castro, Wong Tien Lin	Gloria Romero, Dolphy, Juancho Gutierrez, Barbara Perez, Lee Mei, Panchito, Tito Galla	Sampaguita Pictures, Golden City Film Company	Drama	
Palaboy	Mar S. Torres	Gloria Romero, Luis Gonzales, Jose Mari, Etang Discher, Bella Flores, Rod Navarro, Zeny Zabala, Riño. Isa, Cora Maceda	Vera-Perez Productions, Inc.	Drama	serialized in Hiwaga Komiks
Paruparong Bukid	Armando Garces	Gloria Romero, Luis Gonzales, Dolphy, Daisy Romualdez, Eddie Garcia, Etang Discher, Boy Planas, Venchito Galvez, Ely Roque, Luis Castro, Jaime Javier, Vic Guevarra, Lilibeth Vera-Perez	Sampaguita Pictures	Romance	
Pepeng Kaliwete	Cirio H. Santiago	Fernando Poe Jr., Lani Oteyza, Leonor Vergara, Ben Perez, Jose Garcia, Larry Ramos, Max Alvarado, Bino Garcia, Doming del Valle, Roger Suerte, Francisco Cruz, Abelardo Cortez	Premiere Productions, Inc.	Action	serialized in Bulaklak Magazine
Pulot Gata	Jose de Villa	Dolphy, Carlos Salazar, Barbara Perez, Tony Marzan, Marlene Dauden, Panchito,	Sampaguita Pictures	Comedy, Romance	serialized in Pilipino Komiks
Pusang Itim	Cirio H. Santiago	Johnny Monteiro, Cynthia Zamora, Lauro Delgado, Carol Varga, Elvira Reyes, Jose Garcia, Ric Bustamante, Luis San Juan, Paquito Salcedo, Mario Escudero, Francisco Cruz, Boy Montes	People's Pictures, Inc.	Horror	
Ramadal	Nemesio E. Caravana	Efren Reyes, Cynthia Zamora, Melita de Leon, Ramon d'Salva, Oscar Roncal, Jose Garcia, Resty Sandel	Premiere Productions, Inc.	Sci-Fi	serialized in Liwayway magazine
Ramir	Ramon A. Estella	Cesar Ramirez, Merle Tuazon, Ruben Rustia, Norma Reyes, Joe Sison, Lito Anzures, Bruno Punzalan, Ric Bustamante	Everlasting Pictures	Fantasy	serialized in Bulaklak Magazine
Rebelde	Artemio Marquez	Delia Razon, Mario Montenegro, Carlos Padilla Jr., Rebecca del Rio, Alfonso Carvajal, Oscar Keesee, Eusebio Gomez, Lydia Antonio	LVN Pictures	Action, Drama	serialized in Bulaklak Magazine
Rosalina	Lamberto V. Avellana	Nida Blanca, Carmencita Abad, Johnny Reyes, Oscar Obligacion, Leroy Salvador	LVN Pictures	Comedy, Drama	
Rose Tattoo Ng Buhay Ko	Natoy B. Catindig	Diomedes Maturan, Charito Solis, Eddie Rodriguez, Carolina Herranz, Lourdes Medel, Menchi Ferrer, Bobby Vallar, Ched Bermudez, Vicenta Advincula, Agnes Ravel, Marie Paz Lopez, Nick Balbona, Tugge Dominous, Combo Jockers, Joseph Palk	LVN Pictures	Musical	
Sa Ngalan Ng Espada	Efren Reyes	Efren Reyes, Johnny Monteiro, Cynthia Zamora, Ramon d'Salva, Lily Marquez, Abelardo Cortez, Nello Nayo, Celia Rodriguez, Mario Escudero, Dely Villanueva, Raul Ramos, Resty Sandel, Felisa Abad, Al Quinn, Francisco Cruz, Pering Valeriano, SOS Daredevils	Premiere Productions, Inc.	Swashbuckler	
Shirley, My Darling	Gerardo de Leon	Zaldy Zshornack, Shirley Gorospe, Eddie Mesa, Abelardo Cortez, Max Alvarado, Carpi Asturias, Bino Garcia, Vicente Liwanag, Berting Labra, Oscar Roncal, Teroy de Guzman, Celia Rodriguez, Elvira Reyes, Jose Garcia, Nello Nayo	People's Pictures	Romance	
Silveria (Ang Kabayong Daldalera)	Octavio Silos	Silveria (The Horse), Alexander (The Horse), Gigolo (The Horse), Dolphy, Tony Marzan, Marlene Dauden, Daisy Romualdez, Eddie Garcia, Panchito, Riño. Isa, Herminia Carranza, Marcela Garcia, Sabas San Juan, Jun Javier, Santiago Dueñas	Sampaguita Pictures	Comedy, Fantasy	serialized in Hiwaga Komiks
Sisang Tabak	Alex M. Sunga	Lilia Dizon, Cesar Ramirez, Ramon d'Salva, Joe Sison, Ric Bustamante, Vicente Liwanag, Ely Nakpil, Pedro Faustino, Flor Bien, Dadang Ortega, Linda Lopez, Siony Alba, Fred Concengco, Rene Tinoco, Dorothy Maxwell, Celestino Salinas, Quiel Segovia, Baby Tessie Valenciano, Ace York Ramirez, Irene Worrell, Vic Diaz	Cinematic Philippines, Inc.	Action, Drama	
Sta. Rita de Casia (Patrona Ng Imposible)	Ramon A. Estella	Rosemarie Gil, Lauro Delgado, Carol Varga, Max Alvarado, Jose Garcia, Dolly Garcia, Belen Velasco, Mila Miranda, Luis San Juan, Bob Padilla, Lita Cristobal, Carolina Herranz, Francisco Cruz, Guillermo Carls, Juan Bautista	Premiere Productions, Inc.	Drama	debut film of Rosemarie Gil
Talipandas	Conrado Conde	Rita Gomez, Luis Gonzales, Van de Leon, Carlos Salazar, Bella Flores, Zeny Zabala, Pacita Arana, Ely Roque, Matimtiman Cruz, Marlene Dauden, Lolita Rodriguez	Sampaguita Pictures	Drama	serialized in Pilipino Komiks
Tatak Ni Solomon (Seal Of Solomon)	Rolf Bayer	Pancho Magalona, Tita Duran, Saloma, Ahmad Mahmud, Salleh Kamil, Mariani, Daeng Idris, Aziz Sattar, A. Rahim, Tony Estrada	Shaw Malaya Film Productions, Inc., LVN Pictures	Drama	serialized in Romansa Comics first Filipino language produced in Malaya (Singapore today then part of Malaya or now called Malaysia)
Tatang Edyer	Tony Cayado	Paraluman, Dolphy, Eddie Arenas, Daisy Romualdez, Herminia Carranza, Twins Darling, Marcela Garcia, Santiago Dueñas, Jose Salameda, Sabas San Juan	Sampaguita Pictures	Comedy, Musical	
Tatlong Ilaw Sa Dambana (Kalbaryo Ng Isang Ina)	Jose de Villa	Rita Gomez, Barbara Perez, Daisy Romualdez, Rosa Mia, Greg Martin, Rod Navarro, Luis Gonzales, Aring Bautista, Matimtiman Cruz	Sampaguita Pictures	Drama	serialized in Alimyon and Bulaklak Magazine
Tawag Ng Tanghalan	Armando Garces	Amalia Fuentes, Juancho Gutierrez, Susan Roces, Romeo Vasquez, Jose Mari, Panchito, Boy Planas, Horacio Morelos, Herminia Carranza, Eddie Mallares, Boy Mallares, Diomedes Maturan, Lerrie Pangilinan, Carmen Rosales, Hi-Fi Twins, Carina Afable, Tirso Cruz, Eddie Garcia, Lopito, Ike Lozada, Patsy, Home Rockers, Raul T. Silos	Vera-Perez Productions, Inc., Sampaguita Pictures	Musical	
The Day Of The Trumpet	Eddie Romero	John Agar, Pancho Magalona, Alicia Vergel, Richard Arlen, William Phipps, Myron Healey, Cielito Legaspi, Eddie Infante, Roy Planas, Max Alvarado, Vic Diaz, Jennings Sturgeon	Cirio H. Santiago Film Organization, People's Pictures	Action, War	This was director Eddie Romero's first English-language film for international release. With Cirio H. Santiago of Premiere-People's Pictures and long-time collaborator Gerardo de Leon, he co-produced and directed this film, a period movie set in the early days of the American occupation of the Philippines. The American cast included John Agar, Richard Arlen, William Phipps and Myron Healey. The Filipino cast had Pancho Magalona, Alicia Vergel, Eddie Infante, Cielito, Boy Planas, Vic Diaz and Max Alvarado. At the Fifth Asian Festival held in Manila in April 1958, Boy Planas—who played the brother of Magno Maxalla (Pancho Magalona)--won the Best Child Actor award. The movie made its theatrical debut in the US in 1963 as "Cavalry Command" and was later released in home video with the same title. Alicia Vergel had a kissing scene with star John Agar. Her reaction: "It was my first movie kiss and I certainly hoped it was my last. I was so nervous that I didn't feel anything. [Producer] Cirio Santiago and [director] Eddie Romero were mad at me when we were shooting scenes in Vigan because I didn't like to do the kissing scene. It was only when we were back in Manila that I consented to go into the clinch". Vergel did the kissing sequence after viewing the first rushes of the picture; she suddenly realized that the picture would be dull in America without it. "Besides", she said, "I don't want it said Filipinos don't know how to kiss. But I insisted on only take, Agar commented he liked the kiss so much that he wanted one more take. But I lifted my Maria Clara dress and ran like the dickens, bawling all the while. Later, John teased me: 'I feel insulted. You are my first leading lady I kissed who cried'."
The Singing Idol	Efren Reyes	Eddie Mesa, Tessie Quintana, Johnny Monteiro, Lani Oteyza, Quiel Segovia, Lily Marquez, Nello Nayo, Abraham Cruz, Teroy de Guzman, Al Quinn, Paquito Salcedo, Rogelio Moreno, Ben Cosca, Angie Dominguez, The Gaymasters	People's Pictures	Musical	
Tuloy Ang Ligaya	Manuel Silos	Nida Blanca, Leroy Salvador, Pugo, Lita Gutierrez, Oscar Obligacion, Bayani Casimiro, Charito de Leon, Paquito Toledo, Sunday Contreras, Modern Trio, Tony Moguies	LVN Pictures	Musical	dramatized over DZRH radio
Ulilang Anghel	Jose de Villa	Paraluman, Rosemarie, Amalia Fuentes, Susan Roces, Barbara Perez, Daisy Romualdez, Tony Marzan, Tito Galla, Greg Martin, Jose Mari, Rosa Mia (Guest Star), Tony Cayado, Eddie Garcia, Etang Discher, Delia Marcos, Boy Planas	Sampaguita Pictures	Drama	dramatized over DZRH radio
Venganza	Manuel Conde	Mario Montenegro, Carmencita Abad, Carlos Padilla Jr., Joseph de Cordova, Eusebio Gomez, Jose Corazon de Jesus Jr., Perla Bautista, Mario Roldan, Ben Castillo, Nita Ramos, Joe Ramos, Julian Yulo, Greg Macabenta, Ding Hernandez, Ramon Jurado, Janet Castro, Adelina Balmania, Andres Albo, Flaviano Miranda, Lola Boy, Albert Jurado	LVN Pictures	Action	dramatized over DZAQ radio
Villa Milagrosa	Susana C. de Guzman	Nestor de Villa, Charito Solis, Eddie Rodriguez, Nita Javier, Pianing Vidal, Dan Masinas, Florentino Ballecer	LVN Pictures	Drama, Fantasy, Romance	serialized in Bulaklak Magazine
Wala Kang Paki	Artemio Marquez	Nida Blanca, Nestor de Villa, Marita Zobel, Bernard Bonnin, Guy Donato, Ronnie Villamor, Mila Ocampo, Priscilla Ramirez, Lourdes Medel	LVN Pictures	Drama, Musical	
Wanted: Husband	Nemesio E. Caravana	Zaldy Zshornack, Lani Oteyza, Lauro Delgado, Elvira Reyes, Mary Walter, Celia Rodriguez, Jose Garcia, Bruno Punzalan, Rogelio Moreno, Belcy Martinez, Carpi Asturias, Tony Trajano	People's Pictures, Inc.	Comedy, Romance	serialized in Liwayway magazine
Water Lily	Cirio H. Santiago	Jose Padilla Jr., Tessie Quintana, Olivia Cenizal, Cielito Legaspi, Bob Soler, Belen Velasco, Nello Nayo, Jose Garcia, Leonora Ruiz, Dely Villanueva, Dadang Ortega, Jose Barros, Francisco Cruz	Premiere Productions, Inc.	Romance	Serialized in Hiwaga Komiks
You're My Everything	Josefino Cenizal	Zaldy Zshornack, Shirley Gorospe, Elvira Reyes, Berting Labra, Oscar Roncal, Celia Rodriguez, Nello Nayo, Abelardo Cortez, Carpi Asturias, Felisa Salcedo, Carman Bernardino, Telly Padilla, Lita Cristobal, Carmencita Ferrer, Josefino Cenizal	People's Pictures, Inc.	Romance	Serialized in Kislap-Graphic Magazine
Zarex	Richard Abelardo	Willie Sotelo, Carmencita Abad, Jose Vergara, Alfonso Carvajal, Ric Mojica, Charito de Leon, Arturo Moran, Ludy Carmona, Elena Balmori	LVN Pictures	Sci-fi	Serialized in Pilipino Komiks
Zorina	Consuelo P. Osorio	Chichay, Leopoldo Salcedo	Champion Pictures	Comedy	
1959
Aawitan Kita	Gerardo de Leon	Eddie Mesa, Rosemarie Gil, Ronald Remy, Lily Marquez, Oscar Keesee, Elvira Reyes, Pugak, Abraham Cruz, Nello Nayo, Al Quinn, Rogelio Moreno, Miriam Jurado, Maya Navarro, Dina Morales, Lita Cristobal, Patricia Henson	People's Pictures, Inc.	Drama	Serialized in Liwayway magazine
Alipin ng Palad	Octavio Silos	Lolita Rodriguez, Luis Gonzales, Eddie Garcia, Tony Cayado, Bella Flores, Zeny Zabala, Priscilla Valdez, Cesar Reyes, Leleng Isla, Naty Mallares, Aring Bautista, Lydia Correa, Marcela Garcia	Sampaguita Pictures	Drama	
Amazona	Felix Villar	Mario Montenegro, Celia Fuentes, Ben Perez, Joe Sison, Mercy Guia, Rossana Montez, Bruno Punzalan, Ric Bustamante	Pacific Movie Productions	Adventure, thriller	
Anak ng Bulkan	Emmanuel I. Rojas	Ace York, Fernando Poe Jr., Edna Luna, Ronald Remy, Miriam Jurado, Belen Velasco, Bruno Punzalan, Joe Sison, Elizabeth Rigor, Felisa Salcedo	Premiere Productions, Inc	Drama, fantasy	Serialized in Liwayway magazine
Anak ng Kidlat	Mario Barri	Cecilia Lopez, Cesar Ramirez, Lillian Leonardo, Oscar Moreno, Rocky Rogers, Vic Diaz, Colin Halal, Liza Marin, Ding Tello, Katherine Hotchkiss	Hollywood Far-East Productions; Tamaraw	Sci-fi	Serialized in Espesyal Komiks
Apat Na Anino	Danilo H. Santiago	Cesar Ramirez, Johnny Monteiro, Bob Soler, Lauro Delgado, Cynthia Zamora, Leonor Vergara, Ramon d'Salva, Jose Garcia, Mary Walter, Leonora Ruiz, Vicente Liwanag, Mario Escudero, Felisa Salcedo, Rogelio Moreno, Poleng Mendoza	People's Pictures	Swashbuckler	
Arimunding-Munding	Pablo Santiago	Jaime de la Rosa, Cecilia Lopez, Carlo Mauri, Yolanda Guevarra, Oscar Keesee, Ramon d'Salva, Carol Varga, Nello Nayo, Aida Villegas, Belen Velasco, Dadang Ortega, Francisco Cruz	Larry Santiago Productions, Inc.	Drama	
Asintado	Cesar Gallardo	Zaldy Zshornack, Leonor Vergara, Cielito Legaspi, Bob Soler, Lauro Delgado, Berting Labra, Jose Garcia, Max Alvarado, Francisco Cruz, Menggay, Maya Navarro, Dina Morales	People's Pictures, Inc.	Action	Serialized in Espesyal Komiks
Baby Face	Carlos Vander Tolosa	Jose Mari, Carmen Rosales, Paraluman, Amalia Fuentes, Ven Medina, Meldy Corrales, Nori Dalisay, Lito Legaspi, Boy Alano, Justina David, Ely Roque, Herminiza Carranza	Sampaguita Pictures	Action, drama	Serialized in Extra Komiks
Baguio Fever	F.H. Constantino	Nida Blanca, Nestor de Villa, Liza Moreno, Maria Miranda, Bayani Casimiro, Manny Ojeda, Dina Jimenez, Poochie Morales	LVN Pictures	Comedy, romance	
Bakit May Putik ang Bulaklak		Gloria Romero		Drama, romance	Color film
Barrio Fiesta	Joe Climaco	Letty Liboon, Val Castelo, Luz Valdez, Caridad Sanchez, Perla Bautista	LVN Pictures	Musical	
Bayanihan	Manuel Conde	Nestor de Villa, Carmencita Abad, Manding Claro, Bernard Bonnin, Liza Moreno, Perla Bautista, Alfonso Carvajal, Joseph de Cordova, Caridad Sanchez, Eusebio Gomez, Naty Bernardo, Priscilla Ramirez, Miniong Alvarez, Ben Castillo, Adelina Villamil, The Bayanihan Philippine Dance Group (Featuring)	LVN Pictures	Drama	Filmed in Eastmancolor
Big Time Berto	Pablo Santiago	Berting Labra, Tony Santos, Yolanda Guevarra, Paquito Toledo, Francisco Cruz, Belen Velasco, Dencio Padilla, Blackie Francisco, Bino Garcia, Perla Amansec, Mariesec Miranda, Betty Navarro, Rosa Santos, Paquito Diaz, Big Ben Trinidad, Sylvia Simson, Leopoldo Salcedo, Jose Padilla Jr., Ramon Revilla, Fernando Poe Jr., Zaldy Zshornack, Joseph Estrada, Ben Perez, Jose Romulo, Ramon d'Salva, Luis San Juan, Oscar Keesee, Nello Nayo, Guillermo Carls, Chiquito, Myrna Delgado, Corazon Rivas, Myra Crisol, Teresita Mendez, Carol Varga, Cielito Legaspi, Dely Atay-Atayan, Menggay, Elvira Reyes	Larry Santiago Productions, Inc.	Action, crime, thriller	
Blessings of the Land	Manuel Silos	Rosa Rosal, Tony Santos, Leroy Salvador, Carmencita Abad, Carlos Padilla Jr., Marita Zobel, Joseph de Cordova, Danilo Jurado, Tony Dantes, Miguel Lopez, Priscilla Ramirez, Mario Roldan, Jerry Reyes, Mila Ocampo, Pedro Faustino, Carmen del Ocampo, Vic Cabrera, Narding Pineda, Ricardo Geronimo, Carmen Mariano, Santiago Diamzon, Emerson Medina, Irene Sanchez, The F.E.U. Dance Troupe	LVN Pictures	Drama	Entered into the 10th Berlin International Film Festival
Building in Nation	Luis F. Nolasco				Short film
Chinita	F.H. Constantino	Luz Valdez, Nestor de Villa, Lou Salvador Jr., Angge Lee, Sonia Velez, Manny Ojeda, Pianing Vidal, Lina Prieto, George Go, Ponga, Noel Villaroman, Lourdes Yumul, Vicenta Advincula, Jack Gan, Angel Confiado	LVN Pictures	Comedy	
Cicatriz	Tony Cayado	Lolita Rodriguez, Luis Gonzales, Barbara Perez, Carlos Salazar, Greg Martin, Rosita Noble, Bella Flores, Zeny Zabala, Venchito Galvez, Ven Medina	Sampaguita Pictures	Drama	Dramatized over DZRH radio
Cover Girl	Susana C. de Guzman	Mario Montenegro, Lita Gutierrez, Marita Zobel, Bernard Bonnin, Jose Vergara, Carolina Herranz, The Spotters (featuring)	LVN Pictures	Comedy	Serialized in Aliwan Komiks
Cry Freedom	Lamberto V. Avellana	Pancho Magalona, Rosa Rosal, Johnny Reyes, Jack Forster, Charles Kelley, Tony Santos, Joseph de Cordova, Alfonso Carvajal, Pedro Faustino, Mario Roldan	Banaue Pictures	Drama, Romance	Based on the novel The Crucible by Yay Marking
Debutante	Rosa Mia	Susan Roces, Carmen Rosales, Oscar Moreno, Eddie Arenas, Romeo Vasquez, Daisy Romualdez, Rod Navarro, Marcela Garcia, Aring Bautista	Sampaguita Pictures	Drama	Serialized in Liwayway magazine
Detective Maturan	Natoy Catindig	Diomedes Maturan, Pugo, Lopito, Patsy, Luz Valdez, Liza Moreno, Caridad Sanchez, Ric Gutierrez, Pabo Zapata, Jose Vergara, Robert Campos	LVN Pictures	Comedy, drama	
Duke de Borgoña	Nemesio E. Caravana	Fernando Poe Jr., Rosemarie Gil, Merle Tuazon, Elvira Reyes, Nello Nayo, Joe Sison, Celia Rodriguez, Abraham Cruz, Renato Robles, Max Alvarado, Rogelio Moreno, Aida Villegas, Felisa Salcedo, Lilia Duran, Belcy Martinez, Lita Cristobal	Premiere Productions, Inc.	Swashbuckler	Serialized in Aliwan Komiks
El Legado	Lamberto V. Avellana				Short film
Esmeralda	Octavio Silos	Carmen Rosales, Oscar Moreno, Barbara Perez, Carlos Salazar, Daisy Romualdez, Rosa Mia, Rosita Noble, Tito Galla	Sampaguita Pictures	Drama	serialized in Espesyal Komiks
Eva Dragon	Teodorico C. Santos	Fernando Poe Jr., Merle Tuazon, Lopito, Elvira Reyes, Nello Nayo, Boy Francisco, Belen Velasco, Mary Walter, Eddie del Mar, Marietta Sanz (Introducing), Rosie Acosta (Introducing), Diana Corral (Introducing), Miriam Jurado, Francisco Cruz, Dadang Ortega, Lilia Duran, Lita Cristobal, Paquito Diaz, Douglas Dahlen, Tony Bobong, Bob Padilla, Dencio Padilla	Premiere Productions, Inc.	Action, Drama	Serialized in Tagalog Klasiks
Frankie	Lou Salvador Sr.	Chona Sandoval, Eddie Rodriguez, Hector Reyes, Myrna Delgado, Lopito, Patsy, Patria Plata, Johnny Reyes, Pedro Faustino, Lourdes Yumul, Roberto Campos, Marie Paz Lopez, Noel Villaroman, Ike Jarlego Jr., Marilou Torres, Noli Arroyo, Cenon Lagman, Bert Alpuerto, Sarding Carmelotes, Roberto Valdez, George Ranara, De Guzman Twins, Rolando San Gabriel, Mila de la Cruz	LVN Pictures	Drama	serialized in Diamante Komiks
Ginintuang Tinig	Natoy Catindig	Charito Solis, Eddie Rodriguez, Diomedes Maturan, Norma Lapuz, Liza Miranda, Vicenta Advincula, Ched Bermudez	LVN Pictures	Drama	
Handsome	Carlos Vander Tolosa	Jose Mari, Susan Roces, Eddie Garcia, Etang Discher, Chichay, Eddie Gutierrez, Patria Plata	Sampaguita Pictures	Comedy, Drama	serialized in Hiwaga Komiks
Hawaiian Boy	Cirio H. Santiago	Fernando Poe, Jr., Eddie Mesa, Rosemarie Gil, Chiquito, Roy Hamilton, Carl Perkins, Miriam Jurado, Celia Rodriguez, Nello Nayo, Jose Garcia, Lito Anzures, Rusty Santos	People's Pictures	Drama, Musical	serialized in Bulaklak Magazine; Filmed in Hawaii, USA
Hindi Kita Anak	Teodorico C. Santos	Mario Montenegro, Eddie del Mar, Tessie Quintana, Cynthia Zamora, Bob Soler	Premiere Productions, Inc.	Drama	serialized in Liwayway magazine
Ikaw Ang Aking Buhay	Mar S. Torres	Gloria Romero, Luis Gonzales, Rosa Mia, Greg Martin, Delia Marcos, Zeny Zabala, Venchito Galvez	Sampaguita Pictures	Drama	
Ipinagbili Kami Ng Aming Tatay	Tony Cayado	Dolphy, Juancho Gutierrez, Barbara Perez, Marlene Dauden, Liberty Ilagan, Greg Martin, Boy Planas, Rod Navarro, Eddie Gutierrez, Lito Legaspi, Boy Alano, The Wing Duo (Nikki and Angie), Meldy Corrales, Delia Marcos, Zeny Zabala, Elizabeth Ramsey (featuring)	Sampaguita Pictures	Comedy, Drama	parody of the film "Ipinagbili Ko Ang Aking Anak"
Ipinagbili Ko Ang Aking Anak	Armando Garces	Paraluman, Van de Leon, Amalia Fuentes, Juancho Gutierrez, Susan Roces, Romeo Vasquez	Vera-Perez Productions	Drama	
Isinumpa	Octavio Silos	Ric Rodrigo, Dolphy, Barbara Perez, Marlene Dauden, Etang Discher, Panchito, Priscilla Valdez, Charlie Davao, Horacio Morelos, Herminia Carranza, Jose Villafranca	Sampaguita Pictures	Drama	
Juan Tamad Goes To Congress	Manuel Conde	Manuel Conde, Tessie Quintana, Adorable Liwanag, Alfonso Carvajal, Joseph de Cordova, Naty Bernardo, Rolando Liwanag, Miniong Alvarez, Greg Urbano, Ben Castillo, Tony Dantes, Lilia Duran, Eddie Boy Serrano, Salvador Zaragoza, Flaviano Miranda, Adalina Villamil, Rene Roldan, Julian Yulo, Barangay Dance Troupe	MC Pictures	Comedy	
Kahapon Lamang	Mar S. Torres	Gloria Romero, Paraluman, Van de Leon, Amalia Fuentes, Juancho Gutierrez, Susan Roces, Romeo Vasquez, Greg Martin, Patria Plata, Eddie Ilarde (as the Announcer)	Vera-Perez Productions released thru Sampaguita Pictures	Drama	aired over CBN
Kalabog en Bosyo	Tony Cayado	Dolphy, Panchito, Eddie Arenas, Barbara Perez, Tito Galla, Greg Martin, Meldy Corrales, Liberty Ilagan, Priscilla Valdez, Eddie Gutierrez, Horacio Morelos, Charlie Davao	Sampaguita Pictures	Comedy	serialized in Pilipino Komiks
Kamandag	Jose de Villa	Paraluman, Jose Padilla Jr., Fred Montilla, Rita Gomez, Van de Leon, Marlene Dauden, Rosa Mia, Tony Marzan, Eddie Garcia, Bert Olivar, Venchito Galvez, Martin Marfil, Cora Maceda	Sampaguita Pictures	Action	serialized in Diamante Komiks
Ang Kanyang Kamahalan	Ramon A. Estella	Zaldy Zshornack, Shirley Gorospe, Lily Marquez, Ronald Remy, Ramon d'Salva, Elvira Reyes, Jose Garcia, Teroy de Guzman, Dely Atay-atayan, Pugak, Mary Walter, Max Alvarado, Marietta Sanz, Dina Morales, Diana Corral, Maya Navarro, Al Quinn, Guillermo Carls, Arturo Coheller, Lita Cristobal, Tony Gosalvez, Blackie Francisco, Bino Garcia, Paquito Diaz, Poleng Mendoza, Dencio Padilla, Doming del Valle, Jess Lapid, Tony Bobong, Henry Rivera, Douglas Dahlen, Ely Legaspi, Ben Lucas	Premiere Productions, Inc.	Drama	
Kidnapped		Tito Galla, Eddie Garcia, Rita Gomez	Sampaguita Pictures	Action	
Kilabot sa Makiling	Armando Garces	Mario Montenegro, Lolita Rodriguez, Van de Leon, Romeo Vasquez, Eddie Garcia, Liberty Ilagan, Chichay, Eddie del Mar, Bella Flores, Guillermo J. Icasiano, Lillian Leonardo, Tolindoy	Sampaguita Pictures	Action	The fight scene of Bella Flores in a muddy pond delighted producer Jose R. Perez that led him to sign her to a 13-year contract with Sampaguita Pictures.
Kundiman ng Lahi	Lamberto V. Avellana	Charito Solis, Eddie Rodriguez, Rosa Aguirre, Joseph de Cordorva, Oscar Keesee, Miguel Lopez, Tony Dantes, Patria Plata, Vic Silayan, Priscilla Ramirez, Miniong Alvarez	LVN Pictures	Drama	
Linda Mora	Artemio Marquez	Lourdes Medel, Lita Gutierrez, Bernard Bonnin, Robert Campos, Arturo de Castille, Joseph de Cordova, Eusebio Gomez, Caridad Sanchez, Menggay, Mario Roldan, Juanita Rodriguez	LVN Pictures	Action, Drama, Romance	serialized in Hiwaga Komiks
Mabilis Pa sa Lintik	Efren Reyes	Efren Reyes, Cynthia Zamora, Bob Soler, Ruben Rustia, Abelardo Cortez, Jose Garcia, Mary Walter, Abraham Cruz, Marietta Sanz, Francisco Cruz, Jesus Lapid, Max Alvarado, Danny Padilla, Paquito Salcedo, Belcy Martinez, Resty Sandel, Rosie Acosta, Diana Corral	Premiere Productions, Inc.	Action, Drama	serialized in Bulaklak Magazine
Marcelino	Roy Padilla	Danilo Jurado, Oscar Keesee, Bert Olivar, Raul Belmonte, Pianing Vidal, Andres Iturbi, Andres Benitez, Arsenio Almonte, Carlos Asensi	Champion Pictures	Drama	
Ang Matapang Lamang	Cesar Gallardo	Leopoldo Salcedo, Efren Reyes, Cesar Ramirez, Edna Luna, Johnny Monteiro, Cynthia Zamora, Bob Soler, Lito Anzures, Max Alvarado, Francisco Cruz, Aida Villegas, Bino Garcia, Jess Lapid, Poleng Mendoza	People's Pictures, Inc.	Action, Drama, War	
Ang Maton	Cesar Gallardo	Efren Reyes, Zaldy Zshornack, Lani Oteyza, Miriam Jurado, Ronald Remy, Jose Garcia, Max Alvarado, Blackie Francisco, Lilia Duran, Rosie Acosta, Diana Corral, Dencio Padilla, Bino Garcia, Jess Lapid, Poleng Mendoza, Rusty Santos	Premiere Productions, Inc.	Action	serialized in Liwayway magazine
Maturan at Lagman	Natoy B. Catindig	Diomedes Maturan, Cenon Lagman (Introducing), Pugo, Lopito, Patsy, Bentot, Marita Zobel, Mila Ocampo, Johnny Reyes, Carmen del Campo, Ric Gutierrez, Pabo Zapata	LVN Pictures	Musical	
Mga Anghel sa Lansangan	Mar S. Torres	Susan Roces, Jose Mari, Rosa Mia, Tito Galla, Liberty Ilagan, Eddie Garcia	Vera-Perez Productions released thru Sampaguita Pictures	Drama	serialized in Tagalog Klasiks
Mr. Announcer	Artemio Marquez	Eddie Ilarde(Announcer), Manding Claro, Marita Zobel, Robert Campos, Rosa Aguirre, Marie Paz Lopez, Noel Villaroman, Ike Jarlego Jr., Johnny de Leon(Announcer), Bernard Bonnin, Lourdes Medel, Agnes Ravel, Guy Donato, Lina Prieto, Vic Silayan, Bobby Vallar, Ponga, Oscar Obligacion, Liza Moreno, Rafael Yabut(Announcer), Leroy Salvador, Eddie Rodriguez, Perla Bautista, Jose Vergara, Joseph de Cordova, Caridad Sanchez, Lourdes Yumul, Arturo de Castille	LVN Pictures	Drama	Three Stories - First Story: "Alaala Ko Pa" - Second Story: " Lundagin Mo Baby" - Third Story:" Remote Control"
Mucho Dinero	Manuel Silos	Charito Solis, Leroy Salvador, Carlos Padilla Jr., Oscar Obligacion, Priscilla Ramirez, Florentino Ballecer, Caridad Sanchez, Maria Paz Lopez, Robert Campos, Lina Prieto, Mila Ocampo, Bobby Vallar, Tony Dantes	LVN Pictures	Comedy, Romance	serialized in Liwayway magazine
Pakiusap	Conrado Conde	Dolphy, Amalia Fuentes, Juancho Gutierrez, Daisy Romualdez, Panchito, Priscilla Valdez, Boy Planas, Horacio Morelos, Cesar Reyes, Isa Rinio, Aring Bautista, Santiago Dueñas, The Bayanihan National Folk Dance Group (Featuring)	Sampaguita Pictures	Comedy, Musical, Romance	
Panagimpan	Gregorio Fernandez	Mario Montenegro, Lita Gutierrez, Agnes Ravel, Tito Garcia, Rosa Aguirre, Oscar Keesee, Elena Balmori, Pianing Vidal, Mario Roldan	LVN Pictures	Drama	
Patay Kung Patay	Mario Barri	Lillian Leonardo, Cecilia Lopez, Carmencita Abad, Oscar Obligacion, Totoy Torrente, Mario Barri, Martin Marfil, Bruno Punzalan, Ding Tello, Blackie Francisco, Bino Garcia, Ace York	Tamaraw Studios	Action, War	
Pilyong Kubrador	Nemesio E. Caravana	Zaldy Zshornack, Lani Oteyza, Lopito, Jose Garcia, Belen Velasco, Nello Nayo, Josephine Sacho (Introducing)	Premiere Productions, Inc.	Comedy	serialized in Liwayway magazine
Pitong Gatang	Efren Reyes	Fernando Poe Jr., Zaldy Zshornack, Shirley Gorospe, Leonor Vergara, Carol Varga, Ruben Rustia, Elvira Reyes, Lito Anzures, Levi Celerio, Dely Atay-atayan, Dadang Ortega	Premiere Productions, Inc.	Comedy	serialized in Tagalog Klasiks
Pitong Pagsisisi	Armando Garces	Carmen Rosales, Gloria Romero, Paraluman, Rita Gomez, Ric Rodrigo, Lolita Rodriguez, Luis Gonzales, Van de Leon, Amalia Fuentes, Juancho Gutierrez, Susan Roces, Romeo Vasquez, Barbara Perez, Marlene Dauden, Carlos Salazar, Tony Marzan, Tony Cayado, Eddie Garcia, Liberty Ilagan, Eddie Gutierrez, Ven Medina, Leleng Isla, Venchito Galvez	Sampaguita Pictures	Drama	serialized in Alimyon and Bulaklak Magazine
Pobresita	Teodorico C. Santos	Eddie del Mar, Olivia Cenizal, Zaldy Zshornack, Lani Oteyza, Carol Varga, Lily Marquez, Nello Nayo, Berting Labra, Belen Velasco, Boy Francisco, Renato Robles, Paquito Diaz, Douglas Dahlen	Premiere Productions, Inc.	Drama, Romance	serialized in Hiwaga Komiks
Private Maturan	Natoy B. Catindig	Diomedes Maturan, Pugo, Lopito, Patsy, Bentot, Hector Reyes, Luz Valdez, Mila Ocampo, Ric Gutierrez, Freddie Castillo, Agnes Ravel (In her first lead role)	LVN Pictures	Comedy, Drama	
Puro Utos, Puro Utos	Fred Daluz	Pugo, Sylvia La Torre, Eddie San Jose, Val Castelo, Merle Tuazon, Rosa Aguirre, Bentot, Nelda Lopez Navarro, Jose Vergara, Carolina Herranz, Ric Tierro, Lovers Trio, Pianing Vidal	LVN Pictures	Comedy	adapted from Sebya, Mahal Kita radio drama
Ramona	Alex M. Sunga	Celia Fuentes, Jose Padilla, Jr., Jaime de la Rosa, Cesar Ramirez, Mario Montenegro, Ben Perez, Amado Cortez	Everlasting Pictures	Action	
Rolling Rockers	Danilo H. Santiago	Fernando Poe Jr., Eddie Mesa, Leonor Vergara, Cielito Legaspi, Berting Labra, Boy Francisco, Renato Robles, Jose Garcia, Teroy de Guzman, Max Alvarado, Rogelio Moreno, Patricia Henson, Dencio Padilla, Paquito Diaz, Miriam Jurado (Introducing), Douglas Dahlen (Introducing), Francisco Aquino (Introducing)	People's Pictures	Action, Musical	serialized in Hiwaga Komiks
Rosa Rossini	Conrado Conde	Marlene Dauden, Ric Rodrigo, Paraluman, Juancho Gutierrez, Carlos Salazar, Tony Marzan	Sampaguita Pictures	Drama	serialized in Espesyal Komiks
Sa Libis ng Nayon	Mar S. Torres	Gloria Romero, Luis Gonzales, Dolphy, Bella Flores, Pacita Arana, Charlie Davao, Lillian Laing de Leon, Herminia Carranza, Aring Bautista, Angie de la Cruz (as The Wing Duo), Nikki Ross (Introducing as The Wing Duo)	Vera-Perez Productions released thru Sampaguita Pictures	Musical, Romance	
Sandra	Jose de Villa	Carmen Rosales, Leopoldo Salcedo, Tony Marzan, Rosa Mia, Etang Discher, Matimtiman Cruz, Venchito Galvez, Pablo Guevarra, Pablo Raymundo, Sabas San Juan, Cesar Cruz (as Dr. Cesar S. Cruz), Jaime Javier, Marcela Garcia, Apolonia Aguilar, Raul T. Silos, Ricardo Mirasol, Cora Maceda, Santiago Dueñas, Willie Dado, Jimmy Evangelista, Yolanda Luna, Jose Morelos, Art Morado, Bert Montalban, Baby de Guzman	Sampaguita Pictures	Drama, Romance	serialized in Tagalog Klasiks
Seksing-Seksi (Mapanghalina)	Luis F. Nolasco	Leopoldo Salcedo, Aura Aurea (On Her First Lead Role), Vida Florante, Liwayway Liwanag (Introducing), Nora Nuñez (Introducing), Vicente Liwanag, Soto, Pepe Pimentel, Romy Brion, Gogo, Pabo Zapata, Tony dela Mogueis (as Tony Moguies), Lily Miraflor, Bruno Punzalan, Rafael Jimenez, Pedro Faustino, Blackie Francisco, Chedeng Guerero, Rossana Montez (as Rossana Montes), Manuel Barbeyto, Lily LaForteza, Ely Nakpil	Luis F. Nolasco Productions	Drama	
Sotang Bastos	Armando de Guzman	Chiquito, Myra Crisol, Joseph Estrada, Teresita Mendez, Boy Francisco, Abraham Cruz, Nello Nayo, Reycard Duet, Francisco Cruz, Dadang Ortega, Ben Amos, Alex de Leon, Yolanda Guevarra (Introducing)	Larry Santiago Productions, Inc.	Comedy, Sports	
Sparring Partner	Artemio Marquez	Lou Salvador, Jr., Marita Zobel, Chona Sandoval, Bernard Bonnin, Oscar Obligacion, Lourdes Medel, Naty Bernardo, Bel Fernandez	LVN Pictures	Comedy, Musical	
Sumpa at Pangako	Pablo Santiago	Leopoldo Salcedo, Tony Santos, Cielito Legaspi, Joseph Estrada, Reynaldo Dante, Elvira Reyes, Luis San Juan, Aida Villegas, Paquito Diaz, Dencio Padilla, Lety Legaspi, Alex de Leon, Cencio Calma, Aida de Guia, Marites Tallafer, Esrella Solano, Ponching Adriano, Fred Andaya, Bino Garcia, Fred Buenaobra	Larry Santiago Productions, Inc.	Action, Drama	dramatized over DZAQ radio
Surrender - Hell!	John Barnwell	Keith Andes, Susan Cabot, Paraluman, Nestor de Villa, Vic Diaz	Allied Artists Pictures, Cory Film Corporation	Drama, War	Donald D. Blackburn would later go on to command MACVSOG during the Vietnam War. Opening credits: DEDICATION This is a true story - - of gallantry, sacrifice and heroism against a relentless enemy. It is fitting that the facts now be revealed. Final film of Susan Cabot.
Tanikalang Apoy	Jose de Villa	Paraluman, Rita Gomez, Lolita Rodriguez, Eddie Arenas, Carlos Salazar, Eddie Garcia, Etang Discher, Van de Leon, Matimtiman Cruz, Bella Flores	Sampaguita Pictures	Drama	The film won for Eddie Garcia the FAMAS Best Supporting Actor (his third consecutive nomination and win) and two FAMAS nominations for Best Supporting Actress (Etang Discher) and Best Musical Score (Danny Holmsen).
Tatak	Tony Cayado	Barbara Perez, Romeo Vasquez, Daisy Romualdez, Rosa Mia, Panchito, Zeny Zabala, Priscilla Valdez, Rod Navarro, Ely Roque	Sampaguita Pictures	Action, Drama	serialized in Espesyal Komiks
Tatlong R	Abelardo Cortez	Rene Arboleda, Oscar Roncal, Abelardo Cortez, Tessie Quintana, Mario Barri, Ric Bustamante, Ely Nakpil, Lilia Varlez, Francisco Cruz, SOS Daredevils, Leon Timog, Tony Navarro, Romeo dela Rosa, Herminia Marcelo, Bruno Punzalan, Restie Sandel, Pat Sison, Estela Estrella (Introducing)	Vida Productions	Action, Drama	
Tayo'y Magsaya	F.H. Constantino	Nida Blanca, Pancho Magalona, Lita Gutierrez, Bentot, Guy Donato, Ric Gutierrez, Pianing Vidal, Viviana Vizmanos	LVN Pictures	Comedy, Romance	
Teen-Ager's Holiday (Pagdiriwang Ng Kabataan)	Fred Santos	Rolando Imperial, Melissa Mirasol, Rene Valdemor, Rhodora Robles, Manolo Austria, Marieta Mijares, Ronnie Lustre, Vicky Luna, Larry Aguinaldo, Pamela Noble, Rice Villamer, Perla Villareal, Armando Villa, Elisa Mendez, Marie Aragon, Diana Cortes, Janet-Quinn Baby, Fernando Victor France, Divina Hermosa, Ruben Romero, Veronica Velez, Danila Madero, Melita Contessa, Dante Barcelon, Estrella Erafia, Obias Boy, Sonia Nueva, Francis Oliver, Rita Sanchez	Fresan Films	Action, Drama	
Terror Is A Man	Gerardo de Leon, Eddie Romero	Francis Lederer, Greta Thyssen, Richard Derr, Oscar Keesee, Lilia Duran, Peyton Keesee, Flory Carlos	Lynn-Romero Productions, Premiere Productions	Horror, Sci-Fi	A warning bell sounded before "horrific" scenes. The video version is called "Blood Creature."
The Scavengers	John Cromwell	Vince Edwards, Carol Ohmart, Richard Loo, Tamar Benamy, John Wallace, Eddie Infante, Mario Barri, Joe Sison, Bruno Punzalan, Renato Robles, Efren Reyes, Vic Diaz	Lynn-Romero Productions	Drama	Co-produced and written by Eddie Romero
Tough Guy	Felix Villar	Fernando Poe, Jr., Corazon Rivas, Chiquito, Teresita Mendez, Jose Padilla, Jr., Ramon d' Salva, Elvira Reyes, Boy Sta. Romana, Nello Nayo, Paquito Diaz, Alex de Leon, Yoly Estrada, Blackie Francisco, Joe Caballes, Ponching Adriano, Dencio Padilla, Jesus Lapid, Flor Bien, Fred Buenaobra, Bino Garcia, Concio Calma, Rufino Ocampo, Primo Yumol	Larry Santiago Productions, Inc.	Action, Drama	Based on Romansa Komiks' Tough Guy published in 1957 by ABC Publications written by Mario Mijares Lopez and illustrated by Deo Asis Grepo
Tuko Sa Madre Kakaw	Richard Abelardo	Nita Javier, Willie Sotelo, Hector Reyes, Luz Valdez, Oscar Obligacion, Vic Diaz, Elena Balmori, Caridad Sanchez, Priscilla Ramirez, Jose Troni, Juling Bagabaldo	LVN Pictures	Fantasy, Sci-Fi	serialized in Hiwaga Komiks
Ultimatum	Cirio H. Santiago	Cesar Ramirez, Johnny Monteiro, Jose Romulo, Amado Cortez, Lauro Delgado, Oscar Roncal, Teroy de Guzman, Bruno Punzalan, Ric Bustamante, Tessie Quintana, Bino Garcia, Dennis Padilla, Paquito Diaz, Jesus Lapid, Poleng Mendoza, Ponching Adiano, Bert Mendoza, Jose Sison, Jose Garcia, Abelardo Cortez, Lito Anzures	People's Pictures	Action, War	
Vicky	Mar S. Torres	Carmen Rosales, Gloria Romero, Ric Rodrigo, Greg Martin, Lilibeth (later known as Lilibeth Vera-Perez Nakpil)) Ven Medina, Matimtiman Cruz, Precy Ortega, Boy Planas, Aring Bautista, Apolonio Rivera, Jr., Pepe Zalameda, Naty Mallares, Apolonia Aguilar, Lulu Tarnate	Vera-Perez Productions released thru Sampaguita Pictures	Drama	serialized in Tagalog Klasiks
Walang Takot	Artemio Marquez	Lou Salvador Jr., Marita Zobel, Bernard Bonnin, Chona Sandoval, Guy Donato, Lourdes Medel, Ronnie Villamor, Mila Ocampo, Robert Campos, Arturo de Castille, Freddie Castillo, Oscar Obligacion, Jose Vergara, Joseph de Cordova, Oscar Keese, Ric Mojica, Pianing Vidal, Naty Bernardo, Caridad Sanchez, Miniong Alvarez, Susan Jorda	LVN Pictures	Action, Drama	
Wedding Bells	Jose de Villa	Susan Roces, Jose Mari, Amalia Fuentes, Romeo Vasquez, Etang Discher, Lito Legaspi, Dolphy, Barbara Perez, Greg Martin, Horacio Morelos, Jose Morelos, the Wing Duo, Gloria Romero, Juancho Gutierrez, Angie de la Cruz, Ven Medina, Rosa Mia, Fred Montilla	Sampaguita Pictures	Comedy, Romance	
Zafra	Mario Barri	Cesar Ramirez, Cecilia Lopez (In the Titular Role), Vicente Liwanag, Bert Olivar, Joe Sison, Ding Tello, Andres Centenera, Blackie Francisco, Flor Bien, Pedro Faustino, Tony Dungan, Arsenio Almonte, Mario Hernandez (The 4 Yogi Soldiers), Rudy Dimalanta (The 4 Yogi Soldiers), Bayani Santos (The 4 Yogi Soldiers), Soriano Sero (The 4 Yogi Soldiers)	Hollywood-Far East Productions, Inc.	Fantasy	serialized in Bulaklak Express Komiks
