= List of Philippine films of the 1940s =

A list of films produced in the Philippines in the 1940s. For an A-Z listing see: Category:Philippine films

Note that due to the Philippines involvement in World War II, film production between 1942 and 1945 was at a stand still.

== 1940 ==
Title	Director	Cast	Production Company	Genre	Notes
1940
Kwarta Na		Andres Bonifacio Garcia Medina aka "Ricardo Medina"		Romance, Action & Comedy	Ricardo Andres Medina's first film and leading role
Awit ng Magulang		Rosa del Mar, Tita Duran, Eduardo Infante, Ester Magalona, Paula Maurat, Rico Romero	Balintawak Pictures		
Cariñosa	Carlos Padilla, Sr.	Lina Alva, Amfaro Karagdag, Leopoldo Salcedo	Sanggumay Pictures		
Senorita	Gregorio Fernandez	Miguel Anzures, Rogelio de la Rosa, Engracio Ibarra, Carmen Rosales, Nardo Vercudia		Drama	the film launched the Rogelio de la Rosa and Carmen Rosales love team
Prinsesa ng Kumintang	Gerardo de Leon	Juanita Angeles, Tito Arevalo, Florentino Ballecer, Mila del Sol, Angel Esmeralda, Cecilio Joaquin, Benny Mack, Amelita Sol	LVN Pictures	Drama	
Puso ng Isang Filipina	Juan Pedro de Tavera	Lina Alva, Rolando Liwanag, Fernando Poe, Sr.	Parlatone Hispano Filipino		
Magbalik ka, Hirang	Lorenzo P. Tuells	Octavio Romero, Bert Le Roy, Jaime G. Castellvi, Rosa Aguirre, Nemesio E. Caravana, Justina David, Gloria del Mundo, Amfaro Karagdag, Corazon Noble, Carlos Padilla, Sr., Ben Rubio, Dina Valle	Sampaguita Pictures		
Huling Habilin	Ramon Estella	Rosa del Rosario, Elsa Oria, Leopoldo Salcedo	Filippine Productions	Drama	
Pakiusap	Octavio Silos	Naty Bernardo, Rudy Concepcion, Pedro Faustino, Joaquin Gavino, Rosario Moreno, Elsa Oria, Sylvia Rosales, Nati Rubi, Billy Surot Viscarra	Excelsior Films	Drama, Romance	
Alaalang Banal		Lucita Goyena, Fernando Poe, Sr.	X'Otic Films	Drama	
Dalagang Pilipina	Eduardo Castro	Lucita Goyena, Fernando Poe, Sr., Cecilio Joaquin, Luningning, Manuel Eloriaga, Domingo Principe, Sonia Reyes, Jose Troni, Martina Jimenez, Antonia Santos	X'Otic Films	Drama, Romance	
Binatilyo	Manuel Conde	Miguel Anzures, Narding Anzures, Carlos Padilla, Sr., Amelita Sol, Gregorio Ticman, Dina Valle	LVN Pictures		
Magdalena		Leopoldo Salcedo	Filippine Productions		
Maginoong Takas	Manuel Conde	Pacita del Rio, Domingo Principe, Precioso Palma, Manuel Eloriaga, Alberto Lazaro, Juan Rodriguez, Felix Torres, Mila del Sol, Amanding Montes, Leopoldo Salcedo, Amelita Sol, Dina Valle	LVN Pictures		
Cadena de Amor	Tor Villano	Jaime de la Rosa, Rosa del Rosario, Angel Esmeralda, Pugo, Togo	Sanggumay Pictures		
Bawal Na Pag-ibig		Norma Blancaflor, Jaime de la Rosa, Angel Esmeralda, Maria Clara Ruiz	Parlatone Hispano Filipino		
Alitaptap	Lamberto V. Avellana	Jose Luz Bernardo, Guillermo Carls, Fidel de Castro, Pacita del Rio, Elsa Oria, Pugo, Nati Rubi, Leopoldo Salcedo, Gregorio Ticman, Togo	Waling-Waling		
Buenavista	Ramon Estella	Rosa del Rosario, Angel Esmeralda, Pedro Faustino, Fernando Royo, Quiel Segovia, Gregorio Ticman, Billy Surot Viscarra			
Lihim ng Kapatid		Pacita del Rio, Arsenia Francisco, Sylvia Rosales, Fernando Royo	Excelsior Films		
Nag-iisang Sangla	Tor Villano	Dely Atay-Atayan, Andoy Balun-Balunan, Fred Cortes, Mila del Sol, Cecilio Joaquin, Leopoldo Salcedo, Victor Sevilla	LVN Pictures		Fred Cortes, Jr. was introduced in this film
Ave Maria	Carlos Padilla, Sr.	Naty Bernardo, Pacita del Rio, Arsenia Francisco, Nati Rubi, Quiel Segovia, Billy Surot Viscarra	Excelsior Films		
Mahal Pa Rin Kita	Jesus Carreon	Manuel Barbeyto, Guillermo Carls, Rudy Concepcion, Pedro Faustino, Franco Garcia, Joaquin Gavino, Mercedes de Gavino, Consuelo Menendez, Ernesto La Guardia, Rosario Moreno, Nati Rubi, Digna Amor	Excelsior Films	Drama, Romance	
Patawad	Tor Villano	Reynaldo Dante, Pacita del Rio, Pugo, Purita Sta. Maria, Togo	Sampaguita Pictures	Drama	
Dilim at Liwanag	Eduardo de Castro	Fernando Poe, Jovita Fuentes, Lucita Goyena, Mona Lisa, Ben Rubio	Atic Inc, X'Otic Films		
Paraluman	Tor Villano	Paraluman, Fernando Poe, Sr., Tessie Quintana, Mona Lisa, Salvador Zaragoza, Amanding Montes, Manuel Eloriaga, Jose Troni, Lina Rosales, Martina Jimenez	X'Otic Films	Romance	
Magtanim Hindi Biro	Mar I. Esmeralda	Purita de la Rosa, Cecilio Joaquin, Benny Mack, Purita Sta. Maria	LVN Pictures		
Dating Sumpaan	Carlos Padilla, Sr.	Pacita del Rio, Ernesto La Guardia, Rosario Moreno, Leopoldo Salcedo, Billy Surot Viscarra	Excelsior Films		
Dalaga		Norma Blancaflor, Ely Ramos, Nati Rubi		Drama	
Rosa Birhen	Josefino Cenizal	Josefino Cenizal, Bayani Casimiro, Domingo Principe, J. del Prado, Tomasa Alvarez, Nelly Sunico, Dolores Halili, Jose Cris Soto, Lirio Lakindanum, Raymunda Guidote Abila	San Francisco de Monte Pictures	Drama, Romance	
Flores de Mayo		Leopoldo Salcedo	Filippine Productions		
Jazmin	Don Dano	Flor de Jasmin, Roberto Rosales, Rosa Aguirre, Miguel Anzures, Isa Delgado, Jose Luna, Olympio La Torre, Engracio Ibarra	Sampaguita Pictures		
Inang Pulot	Mauricio Guidote	Narding Anzures, Billy Surot Viscarra	Del Monte		
Datu Talim		Mona Lisa, Luningning, Fernando Poe, Sr.	X'Otic Films		
Ibong Sawi	Paquito Bolero, Octavio Silos	Jaime de la Rosa, Lirio Lerma, Pacita del Rio, Tony Arnaldo, Naty Bernardo, Tommy de la Rosa, Jose Cris Soto	Excelsior Films	Drama	
Dugo ng Alipin	Tor Villano	Reynaldo Dante, Estela Mari, Pugo, Purita Sta. Maria, Togo	Cervatina Filipina		
Kamoning	George Santos	Lina Alva, Ramon Crespo, Arsenia Francisco	Cervatina Filipina		
Santa	Mar I. Esmeralda	Manuel Barbeyto, Bayani Casimiro, Angel Esmeralda	Majestic Pictures		
Tala sa Kabukiran	Mar I. Esmeralda	Oscar del Rosario, Angel Esmeralda, Purita Sta. Maria	Majestic Pictures		
Tinig ng Pag-ibig	Ted del Rio	Jose Luz Bernardo, Norma Blancaflor, Canuplin, Ester Magalona, Fernando Poe, Sr., Alipio Silverio	Joaquin Film Company		
Hatinggabi		Mila del Sol, Ely Ramos	LVN Pictures		
Kahapon Lamang	Manuel Silos	Jaime de la Rosa, Angel Esmeralda, Patricia Mijares, Corazon Noble, Lilia Vizconde	Sampaguita Pictures		
Hali		Monang Carvajal, Mila del Sol, Ely Ramos	LVN Pictures		
Magpakailanman	Carlos Padilla, Sr.	Pedro Faustino, Rosario Moreno, Jose Padilla, Jr., Fernando Royo, Quiel Segovia	Excelsior Films		
Inday	Lamberto V. Avellana	Ernesto La Guardia, Elsa Oria, Carlos Padilla, Sr., Arsenia Francisco, Guillermo Carls, Vicenta Fernandez, Nati Rubi, Letty Perez, Vicente Ocampo, Fidel de Castro, Jerry & His Romancers, Gregorio Ticman, Lilian Velez, Socorro Campillos	Filippine Productions	Musical, Romance	
Sa Dating Pugad		Norma Blancaflor, Jose Padilla, Jr., Guillermo Carls, Amfaro Karagdag, Ernesto La Guardia, Carlos Padilla, Sr., Leroy Salvador, Billy Surot Viscarra		Drama, Romance	
Libingang Bakal		Leopoldo Salcedo	Filippine Productions		
Ikaw Rin	Octavio Silos	Guillermo Carls, Rudy Concepcion, Pacita del Rio, Elsa Oria, Nati Rubi, Franco Garcia, Carmen Sanchez	Excelsior Films	Drama	last film of Rudy Concepcion
Diwa ng Awit	Manuel Silos	Rogelio de la Rosa, Carmen Rosales, Precioso Palma, Bert Le Roy, Franco Garcia, Jose Cris Soto, África de la Rosa	Sampaguita Pictures	Drama, Romance	
Estrellita		Romy Brion, Lota Delgado, Angel Esmeralda, Benny Mack, Corazon Noble, Rogelio de la Rosa	Sampaguita Pictures		
Colegiala	Gregorio Fernandez	Rogelio de la Rosa, Carmen Rosales, Lota Delgado, Octavio Romero, Gregorio Fernandez, Preciosa Palma, Juanita Angeles, Engracio Ibarra, Nardo Vercudia, Rita Rica, Bert LeRoy	Sampaguita Pictures	Romance	
Gunita	Manuel Silos	Miguel Anzures, Narding Anzures, Dely Atay-atayan, Justina David, Rogelio de la Rosa, Lota Delgado, Bert LeRoy, Corazon Noble, Rita Rica, Octavio Romero, Adelina Solano	Sampaguita Pictures	Romance	
Katarungan	Gregorio Fernandez	Lota Delgado, Rogelio de la Rosa, Gregorio Fernandez, Bert Le Roy, Rodolfo Sotelo, Nardo Vercudia, Purita Lim, Guillermo E. Carls, Eusebio Gomez	Sampaguita Pictures	Drama, Romance	
Lambingan	Lorenzo P. Tuells	Rosa Aguirre, Rogelio de la Rosa, Carmen Rosales, Juanita Angeles	Sampaguita Pictures	Romance	
Nang Mahawi ang Ulap	Lorenzo P. Tuells	Rogelio de la Rosa, Lota Delgado, Rosa Aguirre, Bert Le Roy, Precioso Palma, Rita Rica, Tita Duran, Africa de la Rosa, Patring Gomez, Engracio Ibarra, Horacio Morelos, Nardo Vercudia	Sampaguita Pictures		
Pangarap	Carmen Concha	Tita Duran, Angel Esmeralda, Benny Mack, Horacio Morelos, Purita Sta. Maria	LVN Pictures		
Lihim ng Lumang Simbahan	Tor Villano	Reynaldo Dante, Tita Duran, Luningning, Pugo, Togo	X'Otic Films		
Sa Duyan ng Pagmamahal		Tita Duran			
Sawing Gantimpala	Manuel Conde	Ely Ramos, Mila del Sol, Dina Valle, Tita Duran, Precioso Palma, Cecilio Joaquin, Amelita Sol, Maneng Eloriaga, Alberto Lazaro, Salvacion Ortega, Nenita Sarmiento, Purita de la Rosa, Fred Cortes	LVN Pictures	Drama, Romance	the film is based on a song written for Mila del Sol by Philippines First Lady, Aurora A. Quezon.
Bahaghari	Don Dano	Rosa Aguirre, Miguel Anzures, Narding Anzures, Tita Duran, Eusebio Gomez, Corazon Noble	Sampaguita Pictures		

== 1941–1949 ==
Title	Director	Cast	Production Company	Genre	Notes
1941
Ibong Adarna	Vicente Salumbides	Mila del Sol, Fred Cortes, Ester Magalona, Deanna Prieto, Vicente Oliver, Ben Rubio, Cecilio Joaquin, Rosario Lam, Miguel Anzures, Canuplin, Juan Rodriguez, Regio Vila, Amador Alegre, Angeles Gayoso	LVN Pictures	Adventure, Drama, Fantasy	the first Filipino movie with color sequence film.(hand-painted, frame by frame).
Villa Hermosa	Manuel Conde	Fred Cortes, Mila del Sol, Pedro Faustino, Leopoldo Salcedo, Gregorio Ticman, Dina Valle	LVN Pictures		
Prinsipe Teñoso	Manuel Conde	Teddy Aliermo, Jose Luz Bernardo, Nina Carmona, Mila del Sol, Manuel Eloriaga, Eduardo Infante, Cecilio Joaquin, Rolando Liwanag, Ester Magalona, Jose Maximo, Carlos Padilla, Sr., Ramona Palma, Deanna Prieto, Juan Rodriguez	LVN Pictures		
Babalik Ka Rin	Octavio Silos	Arsenia Francisco, Rodolfo Ruiz, Patricia Mijares, Victor Sevilla, Pedro Faustino, Jose Nieto, Rosario Lam, Guillermo Carls, Vicente Ocampo, Mercedes de Gavino, Fred Cortes, Dina Valle	Excelsior Films	Romance	
Mariposa		Monang Carvajal, Violeta del Campo, Pacita del Rio, Angel Esmeralda, Corazon Noble	Sampaguita Pictures	Musical, Romance	
Ararong Ginto	Manuel Conde	Mila del Sol, Carlos Padilla, Sr., Deanna Prieto, Dick Roque, Fernando Royo, Leopoldo Salcedo, Quiel Segovia	LVN Pictures		
Maputing Dambana		Mona Lisa, Amanding Montes, Paraluman, Fernando Poe, Sr.	X'Otic Films	Action	
Ang Viuda Alegre	Enrique Herrera-Davila	Lucita Goyena, Fernando Poe, Sr., Serafin Garcia, Mona Lisa, R. Centenera, Manuel Eloriaga, Juanito Lazaga, Rosario Ong, Sonia Reyes, Antonia Santos, Jose Troni, Lupe Velasco, S. Zaragosa	X'Otic Films	Comedy	a version of The Merry Widow (1925) and several other versions earlier and later
Binatillo	Manuel Conde	Narding Anzures, Dina Valle, Carlos Padilla, Sr., Gregorio Ticman, Miguel Anzures, Amelita Sol, Deanna Prieto, Eduardo Infante, Negro Villa, Juan Rodriguez, Lorenzo Villa	LVN Pictures	Drama, Romance	
Hiyas ng Dagat	Manuel Conde	Fred Cortes, Mila del Sol, Eduardo Infante, Ester Magalona, Carlos Padilla, Sr., Leopoldo Salcedo, Gregorio Ticman	LVN Pictures		
Palikero		Pacita del Rio, Lilian Leonardo, Carmen Rosales	Sampaguita Pictures		
Palaris	Antonio G. Verches	Fernando Poe, Sr., Monang Carvajal, Mona Lisa, Amanding Montes, Paraluman, Tessie Quintana	X'Otic Films	Action	followed with a sequel, Awit ni Palaris (1946) and Awit ni Palaris (1955)
Rosalinda	Lamberto V. Avellana	Mila del Sol, Leopoldo Salcedo, Fred Cortes, Ester Magalona, Gregorio Ticman, Deanna Prieto, Juan Rodriguez, Ricardo Pasion	LVN Pictures		
Ilang-ilang	Ramon Estella	Jose Luz Bernardo, Guillermo Carls, Rosa del Rosario, Pedro Faustino, Vicente Ocampo, Nati Rubi, Leopoldo Salcedo, Gregorio Ticman, Billy Surot Viscarra	LVN Pictures		
Angelita	Guillermo J. Icasiano	Jose Luz Bernardo, Fred Cortes, Reynaldo Dante, Mila del Sol, Cecilio Joaquin, Benny Mack, Ester Magalona	LVN Pictures		
Anong Ganda Mo	Gerardo de Leon	Rogelio de la Rosa	RDR Productions		
Carmen		Justina David, Pacita del Rio, Engracio Ibarra, Carmen Rosales	Sampaguita Pictures		
Binibiro Lamang Kita		Narding Anzures, Florentino Ballecer, Norma Blancaflor, Perla Garcia, Serafin Garcia, Pugo, Ely Ramos, Nati Rubi, Quiel Segovia, Togo, Lilian Velez	Filippine Productions	Comedy	
Kung Kita'y Kapiling	Tor Villano	Canuplin, Bayani Casimiro, Angel Esmeralda, Arsenia Francisco, Marcela Garcia, Yolanda Marquez, Jose Cris Soto	Acuña-Zaldariaga		
Panibugho	Lorenzo P. Tuells	Monang Carvajal, Pacita del Rio, Vitang Escobar, Corazon Noble, Jose Padilla, Jr., Precioso Palma, Rita Rica, Amelita Sol, Jose Cris Soto	Sampaguita Pictures		
Halimaw	Tor Villano	Monang Carvajal, Bayani Casimiro, Armando Crisostomo, Luningning, Jose Cris Soto	X'Otic Films	Horror	
Sa Iyong Kandungan	Guillermo J. Icasiano	Tony Arnaldo, Teddy Benavidez, Jose Luz Bernardo, Pacita del Rio, Engracio Ibarra, Lilian Leonardo, Corazon Noble, Ely Ramos, Nardo Vercudia	Sampaguita Pictures		
Manileña		Monang Carvajal, Bayani Casimiro, Pedro Faustino, Perla Garcia, Paraluman, Jose Cris Soto	X'Otic Films		
Princesita		Pacita del Rio, Linda Estrella, Engracio Ibarra, Carmen Rosales, Nardo Vercudia	Sampaguita Pictures		
Bayani ng Buhay		Pedro Faustino, Mona Lisa, Amanding Montes, Paraluman, Fernando Poe, Sr., Sonia Reyes	X'Otic Films	Action	
Luksang Bituin	Tor Villano	Canuplin, Armando Crisostomo, Pedro Faustino, Serafin Garcia, Lucita Goyena, Mona Lisa	X'Otic Films	Drama	
Lihim	Lamberto V. Avellana	Pedro Faustino, Ester Magalona, Carlos Padilla, Sr., Deanna Prieto	LVN Pictures		
Binibini ng Palengke	Carlos Vander Tolosa	Ely Ramos, Norma Blancaflor, Pugo, Togo, Florentino Ballecer, Quiel Segovia, Monang Carvajal, Rosario Lam	Filippine Productions		
Kundiman		Guillermo Carls, Joaquin Gavino, Amfaro Karagdag, Ernesto La Guardia, Nati Rubi, Fely Vallejo, Billy Surot Viscarra	Excelsior Films	Musical	
Ikaw Pala	Lamberto V. Avellana	Fidel de Castro, Cecilio Joaquin, Ester Magalona, Vicente Ocampo, Precioso Palma, Fred Penalosa, Deanna Prieto, Fernando Royo, Amelita Sol, Gregorio Ticman, Armando Villa	LVN Pictures		
Ang Tiktik		Tito Arevalo, Eduardo Infante, Lirio Lakindanum	Associated Theaters	Horror	
Niña Bonita		Mary Walter	LVN Pictures		
Ang Maestra	Gerardo de Leon	Rogelio de la Rosa, Rosa del Rosario, Sylvia La Torre	Parlatone Hispano Filipino, RDR Productions	Comedy	first film of singer-actress Sylvia La Torre
Paraiso	Ramon Estella	Jose Luz Bernardo, Guillermo Carls, Fidel de Castro, Rosa del Rosario, Tita Duran, Pedro Faustino, Vicente Ocampo, Billy Surot Viscarra	Excelsior Films	Drama	Tita Duran caught chicken pox during the production of this film
Panambitan	Gerardo de Leon	Rogelio de la Rosa, Tita Duran	Sampaguita Pictures		
Tarhata		Teddy Benavidez, Jose Luz Bernardo, Rogelio de la Rosa, Lota Delgado, Eusebio Gomez, Corazon Noble, Leroy Salvador, Jose Cris Soto	Sampaguita Pictures	Adventure	
Tampuhan	Lorenzo P. Tuells	Rosa Aguirre, Teddy Benavidez, Pacita del Rio, Engracio Ibarra, Carmen Rosales, Amelita Sol, Paco Zamora, Rogelio de la Rosa	Sampaguita Pictures	Drama	
Serenata sa Nayon	Carlos Vander Tolosa	Florentino Ballecer, Norma Blancaflor, Monang Carvajal, Pedro Faustino, Celia Moreno, Pugo, Fernando Royo, Ben Rubio, Togo, Rogelio de la Rosa	Filippine Productions		
1942
Caballero		Rogelio de la Rosa			
Caviteño	Manuel Conde	Mila del Sol, Leopoldo Salcedo	LVN Pictures		
Niña Bonita		Fred Cortes, Mila del Sol, Elsa Oria, Carlos Padilla, Sr.	LVN Pictures		
Princesa Urduja		Pedro Faustino, Mona Lisa, Fernando Poe, Sr., Sonia Reyes, Antonia Santos, Lupe Velasco	X'Otic Films	Drama, Historical	inspiration for the Filipino animation film Urduja (2008)
Haunted House	Paquito Bolero	Bert LeRoy, Sonia Reyes	Sampaguita Pictures	Comedy	
1943
Tiya Juana	Lamberto V. Avellana	Fred Cortes, Mila del Sol, Anita Linda, Ester Magalona, Carlos Padilla, Sr., Leopoldo Salcedo, Gregorio Ticman	LVN Pictures		first film of Anita Linda
1944
Perfidia		Rogelio de la Rosa			
Tatlong Maria	Gerardo de Leon	Carmen Rosales, Norma Blancaflor, Liwayway Arceo, Fernando Poe, Sr., Jose Padilla, Jr., Ely Ramos, Pedro Faustino, Fred Montilla	Toho Film Distributing Co. Ltd.	Drama	
The Dawn of Freedom	Gerardo de Leon, Yutaka Abe	Roma Aguirre, Norma Blancaflor, Angel Esmeralda, Shigenoba Kawazu, Fernando Poe, Sr., Leopoldo Salcedo, Ichirô Tsukida, Denjirō Ōkōchi	Eiga Heikusa, Toho Film Distributing Co. Ltd.	War Drama	aka Ano Hatte O Utte, this film was made by the Japanese occupation authorities in the Philippines as a propaganda film to show the Filipino people the "benefits" of the Japanese invasion and takeover of their country. Director Gerardo de Leon was notified by the Japanese authorities that he had been selected to direct this film. When he protested that he was a doctor - he had passed his medical exams just a few years prior to the invasion - and preferred to practice medicine instead, he was told, "There are many doctors in the Philippines, but only one director". Real American and Filipino POWs were used as "extras" in this film, which was a clear violation of the Geneva Convention. A scene was filmed showing the withdrawal of American forces from Manila during the Japanese invasion. Large crowds of Filipino civilians showed up for the filming, and the Japanese authorities were pleased at the turnout. They were not pleased to later discover that the reason for the large crowds was that the Filipinos wanted to see and talk to the American and Filipino POWs who were being forced to portray "enemy" troops.
Liwayway ng Kalayaan	Gerardo de Leon	Rosa Aguirre, Norma Blancaflor, Angel Esmeralda, Fred Montilla, Fernando Poe, Sr., Tessie Quintana, Carmen Rosales, Leopoldo Salcedo	Eiga Heikusa, X'Otic Films	Action, War	
1945
Ginoong Patay Gutom	Luis F. Nolasco	Fidel de Castro, Arsenia Francisco, Nati Rubi, Leopoldo Salcedo, Billy Surot Viscarra	Luis F. Nolasco Production, Nolasco Bros.		production started in 1941 but was interrupted by the second World War
1946
Aladin	Vicente Salumbides	Norma Blancaflor, Jaime de la Rosa, Naty Bernardo, Salvador Zaragoza, Jose Cris Soto, Vicente Salumbides, Charing Ong, Leroy Salvador, Gil de Leon, Juan Urbano, Canuplin, Menggay, Big Boy Diaz, Pamboy, Leonardo Taylor	LVN Pictures	Adventure, Drama, Fantasy	film adaptation of the Chinese folktale, Aladdin and his Wonderful Lamp
Angelus	Ramon Estella	Arsenia Francisco, Carlos Padilla, Sr., Ben Rubio, Eduardo Infante, Erlinda Cortes, Naty Bernardo, Lopita, Lopito, Horacio Morelos, Rogelio de la Rosa	LVN Pictures		
Hanggang Pier	Oscar del Rosario	Tito Arevalo, Romy Brion, Benny Mack, Patricia Mijares, Pugo, Togo	Palaris Pictures		
Probinsyana		Tony Arnaldo, Florentino Ballecer, Engracio Ibarra, Jose Padilla, Jr., Carmen Rosales, Nati Rubi, Jose Cris Soto	Premiere Productions, Sampaguita Pictures	Drama	first movie of Premiere Productions this certified box-office hit is the first Filipino movie to run for 30 days in the Philippines, earning P225,000 (a huge amount at that time).
Guerilyera	Octavio Silos	Carmen Rosales, Tita Duran, Celso Baltazar, Oscar Moreno, Maria Cristina	Sampaguita Pictures	Drama	
Victory Joe	Manuel Silos	Rogelio de la Rosa, Norma Blancaflor, Art Cantrell, Jose Cris Soto, Amelita Sol, Pilar Garcia	LVN Pictures	Drama	
Orasang Ginto	Manuel Conde	Manuel Conde, Horace Curry, Bimbo Danao, Fidel de Castro, Gil de Leon, Mila del Sol, Elvira Reyes	LVN Pictures	Drama	first Filipino post-war film
Dugo ng Bayan (I Remember Bataan)	Fernando Poe, Sr.	Fernando Poe, Sr., Patricia Mijares, Guillermo Chavez, Zony Quizon, Oscar del Rosario, Rosa Mia, Marta Lao, Rogelio Nite, Oscar Keesee, Sotero de Guzman, Tony Gosalvez, Dolphy, Tony Maquiis, Antonio De la Moguies	Palaris Films	Drama	first film appearance of Dolphy and Rosa Mia
Doon Po sa Amin	Manuel Conde	Africa de la Rosa, Ester Magalona, Carlos Padilla, Sr., Elvira Reyes, Fernando Arroyo, Leopoldo Salcedo, Quiel Segovia, Tolindoy	Mabuhay Cinema	Musical	
Ligaya		Monang Carvajal, Pacita del Rio, Angel Esmeralda, Jose Cris Soto	Oriental Pictures		
Alaala Kita	Manuel Conde	Mila del Sol, Bimbo Danao, Elvira Reyes, Fidel de Castro, Carlos Padilla, Sr., Etang Discher, Patsy, Jose Cris Soto	LVN Pictures		
Death March	Lamberto V. Avellana	Rosa Aguirre, Miguel Anzures, Narding Anzures, Norma Blancaflor, Cris de Vera, Pugo, Leopoldo Salcedo, Togo, Chipopoy, Lopito, Oscar Obligacion, Letty Perez, Angelo Castro, Fred Francisco, Ely Nakpil, Davao Santiago, Amandita, Jennings Sturgeon	Filippine Productions	War	
Gugmang Talasa		Saturnino Villarino, Dulce Lukban		Action, Drama	First Visayan film after World War II
Ang Iyong Ina		Tito Arevalo, Katy de la Cruz	Palaris Pictures	Fantasy	
Ikaw Na	Moises A. Caguin	Tito Arevalo, Patricia Mijares, Pugo, Togo	Palaris Pictures		
So Long America	Gerardo de Leon	Bayani Casimiro, Angel Esmeralda, Benny Mack, Jose Cris Soto, Fely Vallejo	Sampaguita Pictures		
Walang Kamatayan	Tor Villano	Manuel Barbeyto, Don Dano, Rolando Liwanag, Fred Penalosa, Gregorio Ticman	Luz V. Minda, Luzz- V- Min	Drama	
Oo Ako'y Espiya	Olive La Torre, Francisco Lizaso	Jose Padilla, Jr., Norma Blancaflor, Tony Arnaldo, Luis Vizconde, Jose Reynaldo, Pedro Faustino, Amparo Perez	Sta.Maria	Action	
Atrocities of Fort Santiago	Luis F. Nolasco	Ben Benedicto, Guillermo Carl, Josefino Cenizal, Mila Cortez, Qon Danon, Fidel de Castro, Gil de Leon, Cris de Vera, Luis del Rey, Lilia Dizon, Vienta Fernandez, Joaquin Gavino, Isabel Ignacio, F. Imay, Polit Lang, Ven Poculan, Jose Reynaldo, Rosa Rosal, Leopoldo Salcedo, Totoy Torrente, R. Villamin, Alfonso Vinson, Billy Vizcarra	Nolasco Bros.	Drama	
Barong-barong	Oscar del Rosario	Naty Bernardo, Mona Lisa, Pugo, Gregorio Ticman, Togo	Palaris Pictures		
Awit ni Palaris		Fernando Poe, Sr., Flora Mirasol, Pugo, Togo, Oscar Keesee, Rolando Liwanag	Palaris Films	Action	sequel to Palaris (1941)
Ulilang Watawat		Guillermo Carls, Pedro Faustino, Engracio Ibarra, Elsa Oria, Jose Padilla, Jr.	Sampaguita Pictures	Drama	Sampaguita Pictures' first film after World War II
Ang Prinsipeng Hindi Tumatawa	Manuel Conde	Rogelio de la Rosa, Mila del Sol, Elvira Reyes, Erlinda Cortes, Gregorio Fernandez, Jaime Castellvi, Ben de Guzman, Perla Garcia, Africa de la Rosa, Monang Carvajal, Gil de Leon	LVN Pictures		
Dalawang Daigdig	Gregorio Fernandez	Conrado Conde, Fidel de Castro, Mila del Sol, Linda Estrella, Engracio Ibarra, Carlos Padilla, Sr., Leopoldo Salcedo, Rogelio de la Rosa	LVN Pictures		
Garrison 13	Gregorio Fernandez	Rogelio de la Rosa, Mila del Sol, Jaime de la Rosa, Linda Estrella, Gregorio Fernandez, Jamie Castellvi, Naty Bernardo, Eusebio Gomez, Salvador Zaragoza, Fidel de Castro, Engracio Ibarra, Tony Santos, Dick Tuazon, Gil de Leon, Carmen Rosales	LVN Pictures	Action, Drama	
Honeymoon	Manuel Silos	Rogelio de la Rosa, Norma Blancaflor, Pacita del Rio, Art Cantrell, Nati Rubi, Horacio Morelos, Juanito Montes	LVN Pictures	Romance	
Maynila		Tita Duran	Sampaguita Pictures		
Tagumpay	Ramon Estella	Rogelio de la Rosa, Arsenia Francisco, Erlinda Cortes, Jamie Castellvi, Eddie Infante, Naty Bernardo, Fidel de Castro, Cecilio Joaquin, Juan Urbano	LVN Pictures		
1947
Alias Sakim		Anita Linda, Leopoldo Salcedo, Lilia Dizon, Quiel Segovia, Fernando Royo, Lopito, Pedro Faustino, Dick Roque, Justina David, Art Cantrell, Marcial Glorioso, Lourdes Diora	Premiere Productions	Drama	
Ang Himala ng Birhen sa Antipolo	Susana C. de Guzman	Rosa del Rosario, Rogelio de la Rosa, Tony Arnaldo, Rosa Rosal, Africa de la Rosa, Jaime Castellvi, Rosa Mia, Engracio Ibarra, Jose Cris Soto, Blanca Nieva, Gumercindo Buencamino	LVN Pictures		
Ang Kapilya sa May Daang Bakal	Tor Villano	Tita Duran, Oscar Moreno, Guia Imperial, Jose Cris Soto, Vicente Liwanag, Paco Zamora, Rafael Jimenez, Arsenio Almonte, Maria Ballesteros, Wonder Boy, Eduardo del Mar	Sampaguita Pictures	Romance	
Sekretang Hongkong	Moises Caguin	Anita Linda, Domingo Principe, Pugo, Togo, Rolando Liwanag, Engracio Ibarra, Tony Camonte, Divina Gracia, Dick Roque	Premiere Productions		
Ang Lalaki	Gregorio Fernandez	Rogelio de la Rosa, Rebecca Gonzales	LVN Pictures	Action	
Si Juan Tamad	Manuel Conde	Manuel Conde, Elvira Reyes, Rolando Liwanag, Perla Garcia, Monang Carvajal, Gil de Leon, Jose Alpajaro, Don Dano, Mario Roldan, Aurora Dizon, Topy Urbano III, Manuel Rivera, Berting Santos	MC Production	Comedy	
Hele-Hele (Bago Quiere)		Lilian Leonardo, Carmen Rosales	Sampaguita Pictures	Drama	writer is Eddie Romero
Kaaway ng Bayan	Paquito Bolero	Carmen Rosales, Leopoldo Salcedo, Lilia Vizconde	Sampaguita Pictures	Drama	writer is Eddie Romero
Tandang Sora	Lamberto V. Avellana	Rosa del Rosario, Pedro Faustino, Engracio Ibarra, Eduardo Infante, Fernando Royo, Leopoldo Salcedo, Quiel Segovia		Historical Biopic	first screen adaptation of Filipino heroine, Tandang Sora
Hagibis	Fernando Poe, Sr.	Fernando Poe, Sr., Erlinda Cortes, Pacita del Rio, Rolando Liwanag, Virginia Warne, Cecilio Joaquin, Rosa Mia, Paul Pelaez, Oscar del Rosario	Fernando Poe Production, Palaris Films	Action, Drama	
The End of the Road	Lamberto V. Avellana		Ateneo Alumni Association		
G.I. Fever	Jose Climaco	Romy Brion, Chuchi, Serafin Garcia, Jose Troni, Lilian Velez	3 Star Pictures, Monserrat Enterprises	Comedy	
Maria Kapra	Angel Esmeralda	Jose Luz Bernardo, Ricardo Brillantes, Jose de Villa, Angel Esmeralda, Linda Estrella, Mona Lisa, Vicente Ocampo, Dick Roque	Sampaguita Pictures	Comedy	
Sa Ngiti Mo Lamang	Lamberto V. Avellana	Leopoldo Salcedo, Mila del Sol, Carlos Padilla, Sr., Lopito, Gregorio Ticman, Norma Blancaflor	Eduque Production	Drama, Romance	
Ang Estudyante	Fermin Barva	Narding Anzures, Lilian Velez, Pugo, Togo, Rosa Aguirre, Miguel Anzures, Angelo Castro, Jose Luz Bernardo, Amparo Velez	Filippine Productions	Drama, Musical	
Kamagong: Bayani Ng Mahirap		Josefino Cenizal, Rosa Rosal, Leopoldo Salcedo, Billy Surot Viscarra	Nolasco Bros.	Action, Drama	
Ngayon at Kailanman	Carlos Padilla, Sr.	Romy Brion, Anita Linda, Benny Mack, Ester Magalona, Carlos Padilla, Sr., Fernando Royo, Nati Rubi, Tolindoy	Premiere Productions		
Oh, Salapi!		Monang Carvajal, Bayani Casimiro, Pacita del Rio, Victor Sevilla, Jose Cris Soto	LVN Pictures		
Nabasag ang Banga	Manuel Conde	Manuel Conde, Elvira Reyes, Ben Rubio, Estrella Lopez, Monang Carvajal, Pepito Alpajaro, Mario Roldan, Perla Oriente, Berting Santos, B.M. Dizon, Cary Ibita	Oriental Pictures	Comedy, Romance	
La Paloma	Tor Villano	Paraluman, Fred Montilla, Lilian Leonardo, Rico Romero, Vicente Liwanag, Rafael Jimenez, Jose Cris Soto	Sampaguita Pictures	Drama, Romance	Fred Montilla suffered burns on his face due to the heavy make-up.
Noong Bata Pa si Sabel	Oscar del Rosario	Katy de la Cruz, Alfredo De Lara, Pugo, Gregorio Ticman, Togo	Fernando Poe Production, Palaris Pictures		
Bakya Mo Neneng	Consuelo P. Osorio	Dely Atay-Atayan, Rosa del Rosario, Leopoldo Salcedo, Rosa Rosal, Sylvia Rosales, Carlos Padilla, Sr., Tolindoy, Lopito, Lilia Dizon, Pilar Padilla, Armando Villa, Engracio Ibarra	Premiere Productions	Action; Musical; Romance	
Daily Doble	Oscar del Rosario	Rosa Aguirre, Pugo, Sylvia Rosales, Togo	Fernando Poe Production	Comedy	
Hanggang Langit	Paquito Bolero	Leopoldo Salcedo, Mona Lisa, Ricardo Brillantes, Engracio Ibarra, Vicente Ocampo, Rosa Mia, Chipopoy, Jose Camia, Bella Flor, Berting "Wonder Boy" Labra	Kayumanggi Cinema		
Pangarap Ko'y Ikaw Rin	Consuelo P. Osorio	Florentino Ballecer, Romy Brion, Conrado Conde, Gil de Leon, Benny Mack, Carlos Padilla, Sr.	Premiere Productions	Romance	
Violeta	Susana de Guzman	Jose Padilla, Jr., Tony Arnaldo, Alfonso Carvajal, Mila del Sol, Dina Valle	LVN Pictures		
Romansa		Tony Arnaldo, Jaime de la Rosa, Mila del Sol	LVN Pictures		
Sanggano		Tito Arevalo, Chiquito, Abraham Cruz, Katy de la Cruz, Marcela Garcia, Luningning, Gregorio Ticman	Palaris Pictures	Action	first film of Chiquito
Dalawang Anino	Moises A. Caguin	Tony Camonte, Canuplin, Erlinda Cortes, Vicente Oliver, Quiel Segovia, Fred Gonzales, Chipopoy, Jacinto Solomon, Nar Limson, Terry Clemens, Ben Pineda, Larry Manuel, Ding Manalang, Fidela "Tiya Dely" Magpayo	SVS Pictures		
Sa Kabukiran	Jose Climaco	Lilian Velez, Narding Anzures, Fred Santos, Tolindoy, Romy, Yolanda Oria, Lina Blanca, Guillermo Carls	Filippine Productions		
Limbas	Fernando Poe, Sr.	Fernando Poe, Sr., Erlinda Cortes, Dolores Mojica, Rolando Liwanag, Flora Mirasol	Fernando Poe Production	Drama	
Hagibis	Consuelo P. Osorio	Rogelio de la Rosa, Jose Luz Bernardo, Don Dano, Reynaldo Dante, Rosa del Rosario, Carlos Padilla Sr., Amelita Sol, Tolindoy	Premiere Productions	Action, Adventure	
Bisig ng Batas	George Santos	Mona Lisa, Ricardo Brillantes, Pacita del Rio, Fernando Royo, Rosa Mia, Vicente Ocampo, Jose Luz Bernardo, Luis Vizconde, Isa Rino	McLaurin Bros.	Romance	
Haciendera	Lamberto V. Avellana	Fernando Poe, Sr., Gil de Leon, Rosa del Rosario, Eduardo Infante, Quiel Segovia	Corazon Roque Production, Phils. Artist Guild	Action, Drama	Fernando Poe's fingers were swollen for several days after Rosa Del Rosario actually bit his hand in one of the scenes.
Magkaibang Lahi	Ramon Estella, Nardo Vercudia	Corazon Noble, Ely Ramos, Tony Arnaldo, Rosita del Cielo, Art Cantrell, Gregorio Ticman, Isa Bonita, Mila del Sol, Doro de los Ojos, Leonora Ruiz, Togo	LVN Pictures	Drama	In the movie, the character of Corazon Noble was bayoneted in the arm by Japanese soldiers. It happened to the actress in real life during World War II, years before the making of this movie.
Si, Si, Señorito	Lorenzo P. Tuells	Carmen Rosales, Oscar Moreno, Fred Montilla, Pacita del Rio, Maria Cristina	Sampaguita Pictures	Drama	
Miss Philippines	Gregorio Fernandez	Norma Blancaflor, Jose Padilla, Jr., Alfonso Carvajal, Lirio del Valle, Engracio Ibarra, Lopita, Tony Santos, Jose Cris Soto, Gregorio Fernandez	LVN Pictures	Comedy	
Ikaw ay Akin	Gerardo de Leon	Bayani Casimiro, Bimbo Danao, Jaime de la Rosa, Victor Sevilla, Amelita Sol, Paco Zamora	LVN Pictures		
’Sang Kuartang Abaka	Carlos Padilla, Sr.	Africa de la Rosa, Pedro Faustino, Gregorio Ticman, Tolindoy	E.K. Films		
Tayug: Ang Bayang Api	Gerardo de Leon	Manuel Barbeyto, Ricardo Brillantes, Conrado Conde, Tony Cruz, Arsenia Francisco, Leopoldo Salcedo	Pedro Vera Pictures	Drama	
Maling Akala	Luis Silos	Jose Padilla, Jr., Mila del Sol, Guia Imperial, Banahaw Sevilla, Nati Rubi, Francisco Monroy, Manuel Eloriaga, Jose Cris Soto, Monang Carvajal, Bayani Casimiro, Teodolfo Belarmino	LVN Pictures		
Si Malakas at Si Maganda	Violeta del Campo	Tony Benroy, Rosa del Rosario	Philippine Paradise Pictures		
Caprichosa	Ramon Estella	Tony Benroy, Romy Brion, Gil de Leon, Rosa del Rosario, Benny Mack, Fernando Royo, Amelita Sol, Tolindoy	Premiere Productions	Musical	
Ginang Takaichi	Luis F. Nolasco	Lilia Dizon, Ernesto La Guardia	Luis F. Nolasco Production, Nolasco Bros.	Action	
Sorry na Lang	Oscar del Rosario	Pugo, Togo, Katy de la Cruz, Baby Jane, Rolando Liwanag, Alfredo de Lara, Batotoy, Aurora Dizon	Fernando Poe Production, Palaris Films	Comedy	
Ina	Eduardo Infante	Rosa Aguirre, Eduardo Infante, Paraluman, Ben Rubio, Leopoldo Salcedo, Quiel Segovia	LVN Pictures		
Mameng, Iniibig Kita	Gerardo De Leon	Carmen Rosales, Oscar Moreno, Roberto Rosales, Jose Cris Soto, Vicente Ocampo, Amelita Sol, Lita Cuevas, Teresita Martinez, Manolo Vaca, Menggay, Manuel Andrade, Jr., Melvin Ilagan	Sampaguita Pictures	Drama	Oscar Moreno sprained his ankle during the fight scene.
Isumpa Mo Giliw	Gerardo De Leon	Angel Esmeralda, Elsa Oria, Ely Ramos, Fely Vallejo	Sampaguita Pictures	Romance	
Bagong Sinderela	Consuelo P. Osorio	Rosa del Rosario, Jose Padilla, Jr., Fernando Royo, Nati Rubi, Pilar Padilla, Amelita Sol, Tolindoy, Beny & Romy, Menggay	Premiere Productions	Drama, Family, Fantasy, Romance	
Backpay	Olive La Torre, Nardo Vercudia	Justina David, Rogelio de la Rosa, Corazon Noble, Jose Cris Soto, Erlinda Cortes	LVN Pictures	Drama	
Sarung Banggi	Susana C. De Guzman	Tony Arnaldo, Rogelio de la Rosa, Mila del Sol, Engracio Ibarra, Rosa Mia, Rosa Rosal, Leonora Ruiz, Jose Cris Soto	LVN Pictures	Drama	
Ang Kamay ng Diyos	Eddie Romero	Gerardo de Leon, Carmen Rosales, Leopoldo Salcedo	Sampaguita Pictures	Drama	directorial debut of Eddie Romero
Lantang Asahar		Tita Duran			
Dahil sa Ina	Octavio Silos	Tita Duran, Oscar Moreno, Fred Montilla, Maria Cristina, Guia Imperial, Francisco Monroy	Sampaguita Pictures		
1948
Ang Anak ng Dagat	Tor Villano	Tita Duran, Paco Zamora	Sampaguita Pictures		
Forbidden Women	Eduardo de Castro	Fernando Poe, Sr., Berting Labra, Mona Lisa, Fernando Royo, Conchita Montes, Bimbo Danao		Adventure	A family-type movie to which, when it was imported into the USA, were added a few shots of nude women - and the title.
Waling-waling		Alfonso Carvajal, Justina David, Jaime de la Rosa, Pacita del Rio, Eusebio Gomez, Victor Sevilla	LVN Pictures		
Beast of the East	Carlos Vander Tolosa, William H. Jansen	Linda Estrella, Alma Rosa Aguirre, Teddy Benavidez, Bimbo Danao, Mona Lisa, Fernando Royo		Drama, War	
Labi ng Bataan	Ramon Estella	Naty Bernardo, Ricardo Brillantes, Linda Estrella, Eduardo Infante, Anita Linda, Mary Walter	Premiere Productions	Action, Drama	Originally named Ako Raw Ay Huk, Premiere Productions, Inc. changed the title to Labi ng Bataan after all the censors (with the exception of Teodoro Valencia) appointed by President Elpidio Quirino refused to issue permit for its release.
Hindi Kita Malimot		Linda Estrella, Carmen Rosales, Leopoldo Salcedo	Sampaguita Pictures	Romance	
Malaya (Mutya Ng Kagubatan)	Luis Silos	Teddy Benavidez, Lirio del Valle, Teody Belarmino, Francisco Monroy, Rafael Jimenez, Salvador Zaragoza, Jose Luz Bernardo, A. Serrano, Tony Santos, Jose Cris Soto, Bayani Casimiro, Monang Carvajal, Delia Razon, Mila del Sol	LVN Pictures	Drama, Romance	
Itanong Mo sa Bulaklak	Paquito Bolero	Dely Atay-atayan, Florentino Ballecer, Rino Bermudez, Chichay, Vicente Ocampo, Carlos Padilla, Sr., Nati Rubi, Mary Walter, Erlinda Cortes	Premiere Productions	Drama, Romance	
Batang Lansangan	George Santos	Ricardo Brillantes, Pacita del Rio, Mona Lisa, Fernando Royo, Vicente Ocampo, Jose Luz Bernardo, Isa Rinio, Ric Bustamante, Ben Cosca, Juanito Guinto, Tony Cruz, Francisco Carel, real life street children	Milagrosa	Drama	first Filipino film that has real life people portraying their titular character
Hamak na Dakila	Paquito Bolero	Rino Bermudez, Jaime de la Rosa, Pedro Faustino, Virginia Montes, Arsenia Francisco, Rolando Liwanag, Amelita Sol, Lopito	Premiere Productions		first film of Rino Bermudez
Selosa	Eddie Romero	Carmen Rosales, Ely Ramos, Lilian Leonardo, Roberto Rosales, Rosie Lorenzana, Vicente Liwanag, Oscar Frazenda, Arsenio Almonte, Ely Nakpil, Ramon Toledo Jr., Dick Tuazon, Liberty Ilagan	Sampaguita Pictures	Drama	
Pista ng Bayan	Lamberto V. Avellana	Carlos Padilla, Sr., Leila Morena, Gregorio Ticman, Lopita, Lopito, Davao Santiago, Rita Rivera, Pedro Faustino, Mimosa, Paul Bing, Tony Mogueis, Lanpo Padilla, Ben de Leon, Pepe Reyes, Trio Melo	Nolasco Bros.	Musical, Romance	
Sword of the Avenger	Sidney Salkow	Ramon Delgado, Sigrid Gurie, Ralph Morgan, Duncan Renaldo, Leonard Strong, David Leonard, Tim Huntley, Trevor Bardette, Belle Mitchell, Lee Baker, Cy Kendall	United Philippine Artists	Adventure, Romance	aka Det hævnende sværd (Denmark), Kostajan miekka (Finland), Il vendicatore di Manila (Italy), O Fantasma das Filipinas (Portugal), Det hämnande svärdet (Sweden)
Meme na Bunso		Angel Esmeralda, Arsenia Francisco, Lupe Velasco	Panay Negros Productions		
Pista sa Nayon	Manuel Silos	Jose Padilla, Jr., Rebecca Gonzales, Tessie Quintana, Victor Sevilla, Eusebio Gomez, Jose Cris Soto, Florentino Ballecer, Jose Luz Bernardo, Angge	LVN Pictures	Romance	
Kaaway ng Babae	Nemesio E. Caravana	Jose Padilla, Jr., Lilia Dizon, Alfonso Carvajal, Armando Goyena, Bayani Casimiro, Angge, Bino Martinez, Zony Quizon, Amandita, Dolly Garcia, Carmencita Palma, Mary Lou Ramos, Ana Serrano, Armando Canseco, Luis San Juan	LVN Pictures	Comedy, Sports	The movie is based on a novel serialized in Ilang-Ilang Komiks.
Perfidia: Kataksilan	Ramon Estella	Fely Cuevas, Lilia Dizon, Anita Linda, Rosario Moreno, Jose Padilla, Jr., Fernando Royo, Tolindoy, Lopito, Nancy Darling, Frankie Gordon, Marcial Glorioso, Guillermo Carls, Vidal Escudal, Arsenio Trillan, Alfonso Reyes, Luis San Juan	Premiere Productions	Drama	
Sor Remedios	Octavio Silos	Paraluman, Fred Montilla, Rosie Lorenzana, Maria Cristina	Sampaguita Pictures	Drama, Romance	
Maestro Pajarillo	Eddie Infante	Rosa Aguirre, Eduardo Infante, Quiel Segovia	Estrella & Co., LVN Pictures	Drama, Romance	
Manugang at Biyenan	Manuel Silos	Norma Blancaflor, Naty Bernardo	LVN Pictures	Drama, Romance	
Puting Bantayog	Gregorio Fernandez	Leopoldo Salcedo, Norma Blancaflor, Armando Goyena, Tessie Quintana, Naty Bernardo, Tony Santos, Casmot, Oscar Obligacion, Gregorio Fernandez, Armando Garces	LVN Pictures	Drama, War	
Huling Dalangin	Susana C. De Guzman	Norma Blancaflor, Tony Arnaldo, Rosa Rosal, Tony Boy, Nemesio E. Caravana, Victor Sevilla, Eusebio Gomez, Jose Cris Soto, Justina David, Engracio Ibarra, Eliseo Carvajal, Miguel Lopez, Mike Accion, Juanito Montes, Constancio de Guzman, Leonor Carmona, Pablo Virtuoso	LVN Pictures	Drama	
Vende Cristo	Manuel Conde	Manuel Conde, Gil de Leon, Lirio del Valle, Linda Estrella, Pedro Faustino	MC Production (Manuel Conde Productions)		
Apat na Dalangin	Carlos Vander Tolosa	Bimbo Danao, Don Dano, Tino de Lara, Rosa Rosal, Fernando Royo	Luis F. Nolasco Production, Nolasco Bros.	Drama	
Anghel sa Lupa	Ramon Estella	Anita Linda, Reynaldo Dante, Cresing Aligada, Lopito, Tolindoy, Engracio Ibarra, Jose Luz Bernardo, Lily Miraflor, Leonor Reyes, Dely Atay-atayan, Kasupang, Jesus Carasoso, Amelia Saginsin	Premiere Productions	Drama	
Bulalakaw	Consuelo P. Osorio	Rosa del Rosario, Carlos Padilla, Sr., Reynaldo Dante, Efren Reyes, Virginia Montes	Premiere Productions	Drama	Virginia Montes along with future husband Efren Reyes were introduced in Bulalakaw.
Sierra Madre, Bundok ng Hiwaga	Leopoldo Salcedo	Leopoldo Salcedo, Vida Florante, Nela Alvarez, Tino de Lara, Blanca Nieva, Gil de Leon, Tolindoy, Rafael Jimenez, Tony Santos, Ding Tello, Victor Salvador, Anita Serrano, Jose Velasco Jr., Ngongo	LVN Pictures	Action	
Isang Dakot na Bigas	Paquito Bolero	Ester Magalona, Carlos Padilla Sr., Rosa Rosal, Mary Walter, Nati Rubi, Amelita Sol, Dely Atay-Atayan, Vicente Ocampo, Reynaldo Dante, Sepo del Rosario, Luz Kahanding, Kasupang, Totoy Torrente, Oscar Obligacion, Lily Miraflor	Premiere Productions	Drama	
Siete Dolores	Carlos Vander Tolosa	Rosa Aguirre, Josefino Cenizal, Bimbo Danao, Don Dano, Gil de Leon, Leila Morena, Ben Perez, Fernando Royo, Ben Rubio, Leopoldo Salcedo	Nolasco Bros.	Drama	
A La Viva!	Lamberto V. Avellana	Fernando Poe, Sr., Patricia Mijares, Carlos Padilla, Sr., Pacita Francisco, Rosa Aguirre, Gregorio Ticman, Rita Rivera, Lopita, Patsy, Pedro Faustino, Oscar Obligacion, Ben de Leon, Meliton Rivera	Philartech Productions	Romance	
Kambal na Ligaya	Nardo Vercudia	Angge, Joseph de Cordova, Tino de Lara, Lilia Dizon, Leopoldo Salcedo, Totoy Torrente	LVN Pictures		
Lukso ng Dugo	Lamberto V. Avellana		Avellana and Company		
24 na Pag-ibig	Olive La Torre	Carmen Rosales, Oscar Moreno, Danilo Montes	Sampaguita Pictures	Drama	
Si Juan Daldal: Anak ni Juan Tamad	Manuel Conde	Manuel Conde, Lirio del Valle, Elvira Reyes	MC Production (Manuel Conde Productions)	Comedy	
Matimtiman; Subtitle: (Babaeng Silangan)	Fil M. Paculan	Mona Lisa, Fred Santos, Gil de Leon, Aurora Dizon, Tolindoy, Amelia Saginsin, Ric Carlos, Sonia de Gracia, Chany Santos, Dulce Amos, B.M. Dizon, Maflege Baby, Bino Garcia, Moines Karlop	Pangilinan Productions	Drama	
Tanikalang Papel	Nardo Vercudia	Norma Blancaflor, Jaime de la Rosa, Alfonso Carvajal, Crising Aligada, Engracio Ibarra, Justina David, Africa de la Rosa, Jose de Cordova, Pat Salvador, Teody Belarmino, Totoy Torrente, Ric Bustamante, Edgardo Sandoval	LVN Pictures	Drama	
Hiram na Pangalan	Ramon A. Estella	Jose Padilla, Jr., Anita Linda, Fernando Royo, Efren Reyes, Virginia Montes, Amelita Sol, Frankie Gordon, Mary Walter, Tony Tolman, Luis San Juan, Dodang Ortega, Luz Kahanding, Marcial Glorioso	Premiere Productions	Drama	
Awit ng Bulag	Octavio Silos	Paraluman, Fred Montilla, Linda Estrella, Maria Cristina, Bert Olivar, Jose Luis Bernardo, Delia Razon	Sampaguita Pictures	Drama, Romance	
Sunset Over Corregidor; Subtitle: (Krus Ng Digma)	Carlos Vander Tolosa	Linda Estrella, Teddy Benavidez, Mona Lisa, Fernando Royo, Bimbo Danao, Rosa Aguirre, Cris de Vera	X'Otic Films	Action, War	Eventually renamed Outrages of the Orient
Sumpaan	Susana C. De Guzman	Ely Ramos, Ely Ramos Jr., Norma Blancaflor, Tony Arnaldo, Rosa Rosal, Alfonso Carvajal, Rosa Mia	LVN Pictures	Drama, Mystery, Romance, Thriller	
Wala na Akong Luha	Eduardo de Castro	Carlos Padilla, Anita Linda, Fernando Royo, Mary Walter, Amparo Aquino, Efren Reyes, Virginia Montes, Amelita Sol, Dely Atay-atayan, Fernando Santiago, Kasupang, Marcial Glorioso, Sonny Padilla	Premiere Productions	Drama	touted as one of the saddest Filipino films of all time
Maliit Lamang ang Daigdig	Consuelo P. Osorio	Jose Padilla, Ester Magalona, Efren Reyes, Dely Atay-atayan, Francisco Cruz, Rolando Liwanag, Tolindoy, Mary Walter	Premiere Productions	Drama	
Ang Vengador	Sidney Salkow	Rogelio de la Rosa, Pacita Francisco, Paquito Bolero, Eduardo de Castro, Ceferino Garcia	United Philippine Artists	Action	
Bulaklak at Paruparo	Gerardo de Leon	Rosa del Rosario, Rogelio de la Rosa, Enrico Pimentel, Lydia Erana, Tolindoy, Nati Rubi, Ana Maria, Dely Atay-atayan, Tony Tolman	Premiere Productions	Drama, Romance	
Bulaklak na Walang Pangalan	Tor Villano	Tita Duran, Pancho Magalona, Danilo Montes	Sampaguita Pictures	Drama	
Hampas ng Langit	Susana de Guzman	Rogelio de la Rosa, Tony Arnaldo, Rosa Rosal, Celia Flor, Merly Fernandez, Priscilla, Eusebio Gomez, Jose Cris Soto, Amandita	LVN Pictures	Action, Drama	
Sa Tokyo Ikinasal	Manuel Silos	Rogelio de la Rosa, Celia Flor, Armando Goyena, Tessie Quintana, Manuel Silos, Lou Salvador, Eusebio Gomez, Naty Bernardo, Gil de Leon, Florentino Ballecer, Rita Amor	LVN Pictures	Drama, Romance	
Pamana ng Tulisan	Octavio Silos	Tita Duran, Africa de la Rosa, Fred Montilla, Maria Cristina, Rosie Lorenzana, Teresita Martinez, Pedro Faustino, Rafael Jimenez, Raul Villeza, Miguel Lopez, Mariano Nuke	Sampaguita Pictures	Drama	
Tatlong Puso		Alfonso Carvajal, Tita Duran, Pancho Magalona, Corazon Noble	Sampaguita Pictures	Romance	
Maharlika	Lorenzo P. Tuells	Tita Duran, Oscar Moreno, Pancho Magalona, Maria Cristina, Roberto Rosales, Vicente Liwanag, Guia Imperial, Teresita Martinez, Rosie Lorenzana, Manolo Vaca, Pedro Faustino, Bert Olivar, Rizalino Mendoza, Jose Luz Bernardo, Leonora Ruiz	Sampaguita Pictures	Drama	
Anak Pawis	Fernando Poe	Fernando Poe, Erlinda Cortez, Pacita del Rio, Rolando Liwanag, Gregorio Ticman, Davao Santiago, Rosa Mia, Salvador Zaragoza, Batotoy, Lily Miraflor, H.R. Ocampo, Vic Andaya	Fernando Poe Production, Palaris Pictures	Drama	
1949
Abogada	Eddie Romero(as Enrique Moreno)	Lilian Leonardo, Rosa Mia, Oscar Moreno	Sampaguita Pictures	Drama	
Alamat ng Perlas na Itim	Consuelo P. Osorio	Carlos Padilla, Reynaldo Dante, Efren Reyes, Anita de Castro, Virginia Montes, Dolly Garcia, Andres Centenera, Don Danon, Sonny Padilla, Danilo Padilla, Luis Castelvi, Piching Osorio, Leonora Reyes, Greg Torres, Enrique Centenera, Minda Bernal, Rufino Ocampo, Engracio Ibarra, Tolindoy, Smile Bengco, Minda Bernal, Jose Luz Bernardo, Lani O. Padilla	Lawin	Adventure, Drama, Fantasy	
Always (Kay Ganda Mo)	Eddie Romero as (Enrique Moreno)	Tita Duran, Pancho Magalona, Tito Arevalo, Luz Mat Castro, Tessie Martinez, Roberto Rosales, Paco Zamora	Sampaguita Pictures	Comedy, Musical	
Anak ng Panday	Consuelo P. Osorio	Rosa del Rosario, Jose Padilla, Jr., Nora Madrid, Dely Atay-atayan, Francisco Cruz, Kasupang, Menggay, Alfonso Reyes, Luis San Juan, Fernando Santiago	Premiere Productions	Drama	
Ang Doktora	Octavio Silos	Pancho Magalona, Lillian Leonardo	Sampaguita Pictures	Drama	First leading role of Lillian Leonardo as the titular character. Serialized in Bulaklak Magazine before its screen adaptation
Ang Kampeon	Lorenzo P. Tuells	Norma Blancaflor, Fred Montilla, Eddie del Mar, Paco Zamora, Tirso del Rosario (Filipino Boxing Champion)	Sampaguita Pictures	Action, Drama, Sports	first Filipino film about boxing
Ang Kandidato	Joe Climaco	Tony Arnaldo, Vida Florante, Pugo, Togo, Florentino Ballecer, Chuchi, Horace Curry, Joe de Guzman, Tino de Lara, Ven Medina, Restie Salas, Pablo Virtuoso	LVN Pictures	Drama	first Filipino film about politics
Ang Lumang Bahay sa Gulod	Eduardo de Castro	Rogelio de la Rosa, Leila Morena, Enrico Pimentel, Fred Santos, Oscar Keesee, Amelita Sol, Lopito, Conrado Conde, Francisco Cruz, Ramon D'Salva, Frankie Gordon, Tessie Villamor, Anita Linda	Premiere Productions	Action, Drama	
Ang Lumang Simbahan	Luis F. Nolasco, Guillermo J. Icasiano	Leopoldo Salcedo, Leila Morena, Rosa Rosal, Pilar Padilla, Alma Bella, Don Danon, Eduardo del Mar, Vicenta Fernandez, Pancho Pelagio, Joaquin Gavino, Jose Reynaldo, Resty Salas, Guillermo Carls, Nena Vasquez	Nolasco Bros.	Drama, Romance	
Apoy sa Langit	Eddie Romero (as Enrique Moreno)	Norma Blancaflor, Linda Estrella, Pancho Magalona, Oscar Moreno	Sampaguita Pictures	Drama	
Bakit Ako Luluha?	Paquito Bolero	Juan Bautista, Rino Bermudez, Reynaldo Dante, Anita Linda, Oscar Obligacion, Vicente Ocampo, Efren Reyes, Nati Rubi, Sese Trinidad	Premiere Productions	Drama, Romance	
Bandilang Basahan	Eduardo de Castro	Rogelio de la Rosa, Anita Linda, Pedro Faustino, Frankie Gordon, Bob Padilla, Enrico Pimentel, Tor Reyes, Luis San Juan, Ding Tello, Totoy Torrente	Premiere Productions	Drama, War	
Batalyon XIII	Eddie Romero	Alfonso Carvajal, Horace Curry, Justina David, Joseph de Cordova, Horacio Morelos, Carmen Rosales, Jose Cris Soto	LVN Pictures, Sampaguita Pictures	Drama	first Filipino full color film
Biglang Yaman	Jose Climaco as (Joe Climaco)	Pugo, Togo, Jaime de la Rosa, Rosa Rosal, Rita Amor, Gil de Leon, Eddie Infante, Engracio Ibarra	LVN Pictures	Comedy	the film is Rosa Rosal's first leading role
Biro ng Tadhana	Olive La Torre	Paraluman, Fred Montilla, Maria Cristina, Guia Imperial, Sylvia La Torre, Danilo Montes	Sampaguita Pictures	Drama	
Bulakenyo	Melania Dolorico	Pugo, Togo, Carlos Padilla, Pacita Francisco, Amelia Amante, Virgilio Araneta, Consuelo P. Osorio, Andres Centenera	Liwayway	Comedy	
Camelia	Susana C. De Guzman	Rogelio de la Rosa, Carmen Rosales, Jaime Castellvi, Tino de Lara, Carmencita Palma	LVN Pictures	Drama, Romance	
Capas	Gregorio Fernandez	Leopoldo Salcedo, Celia Flor, Teody Belarmino, Inday Jalandoni, Nela Alvarez, Gregorio Fernandez, Jose Cris Soto, Oscar Obligacion, Tony Santos, Eusebio Gomez, Armando Garces, Jose de Villa	LVN Pictures	Action, Drama, War	
Carmencita Mia	Paquito Bolero	Carmen Rosales, Fernando Poe, Chichay, Rolando Liwanag, Vicente Ocampo, Roberto Rosales, Luis Salvador, Luis Vizconde, Salvador Zaragoza	Parlatone Hispano Filipino	Comedy, Musical Romance	
Dahil sa Iyo	Tor Villano	Tita Duran, Myrna Delgado, Paco Zamora	Sampaguita Pictures	Drama, Romance	
Damit Pangkasal	Tor Villano	Aruray, Norma Blancaflor, Eddie del Mar, Guia Imperial, Vicente Liwanag, Ricardo Mendoza, Ricardo Mirasol, Oscar Moreno, Lita Rio, Norma Vales	Sampaguita Pictures	Drama, Romance	Norma Vales was introduced in this film
Dasalang Ginto	Moises A. Caguin	Angel Esmeralda, Sylvia Rosales, Pilar Padilla, Tony Camonte, Tony Moguies, Menggay, Paz de los Reyes, Eleazar Garces, Basilio, Leticia Laurel, Gil de Leon	Filcudoma	Drama	
Don Juan Tenoso		Leopoldo Salcedo	LVN Pictures	Drama, Romance	
Dugo ng Katipunan	Ramon Estella	Efren Reyes, Anita Linda, Oscar Keesee, Lopito, Anita Amor, Ramon D'Salva, Fred Santos, Luz Kahanding, Dely Atay-Atayan, Fernando Santiago, Francisco Santiago, Jesus Caballero		Drama, War	Anita Amor was introduced in this film
El Diablo	Richard Abelardo	Leopoldo Salcedo, Rebecca Gonzales, Alfonso Carvajal, Naty Bernardo, Leonor Carmona, Tony Dantes, Antonio de la Moguies (as Tony Moguies), Oscar Keesee, Roger Nite, Lou Salvador	LVN Pictures	Action, Mystery	
Florante at Laura	Vicente Salumbides	Leopoldo Salcedo, Celia Flor, Armando Goyena, Alfonso Carvajal, Teody Belarmino, Delia Razon, Gil de Leon, Ben Rubio, Cecilio Joaquin, Nemesio E. Caravana, Gregorio Fernandez, Jose Cris Soto, Inday Jalandoni, Juanita Rodriguez, Francisco Ablola	LVN Pictures	Adventure, Drama, Romance	
Gitano	Manuel Silos	Jaime de la Rosa, Rebecca Gonzales, Delia Razon, Angge, Monang Carvajal, Jaime Castellvi, F.H. Constantino, Lou Salvador, Jose Cris Soto	LVN Pictures	Action, Musical	
Good Morning Professor	Olive La Torre	Paraluman, Joan Page, Ernesto La Guardia, Oscar Moreno	Sampaguita Pictures	Comedy, Romance	
Haiskul	Fermin Barva	Leopoldo Salcedo, Lirio del Valle, Nela Alvarez, Baby Jane, Ruben Navarro, Rosa Aguirre, Miguel Anzures, Gregorio Ticman, Tolindoy, Oscar Obligacion	Luzon Motion Pictures	Comedy	First Filipino educational picture approved by the Department of Education
Halik sa Bandila	Consuelo P. Osorio	Jose Padilla, Jr., Ester Magalona, Fernando Royo, Amelita Sol, Virginia Montes, Tolindoy, Dely Atay-atayan, Mary Walter, Fernando Santiago, Simplicio Serafin Casupang, Max Alvarado, Totoy Torrente, Efren Reyes	Premiere Productions	Action, War	
He Promised to Return	Fermin Barva	Scott Elliott, Erlinda Cortes, Rosa Aguirre, Cris de Vera, Pedro Faustino, Fernando Royo, Berting Labra, Tina Loy, Ramon Tello, Jose Luz Bernardo, Jorge Santos, Alipio Silverio, Lucio Ablaza, Tony Cayado, Ben Timonera	Lebran Productions, Movietec	Action, War	
Hen. Gregorio del Pilar (Bayani sa Pasong Tirad)	Gregorio Fernandez	Jose Padilla, Jr., Tessie Quintana, Rita Amor, Teody Belarmino, Bayani Casimiro, Horace Curry, Tony Dantes, Justina David, Jose de Villa, Eddie Infante	LVN Pictures	Action, Biography, History, War	first screen adaptation of the life of General Gregorio del Pilar
Hindi Ako Susuko	Alex M. Sunga	Leila Morena, Efren Reyes, Fred Santos, Rino Bermudez, Nena Cardenas, Abraham Cruz, Ramon d'Salva, Kasupang, Pancho Pelagio, Amelita Sol, Ding Tello, Tony Tolman, Totoy Torrente	Premiere Productions	War	
Hiyas ng Pamilihan	Susana C. de Guzman	Mila del Sol, Tony Arnaldo, Bayani Casimiro, Constancio de Guzman, Engracio Ibarra, Victor Sevilla	LVN Pictures	Drama, Musical, Romance	
Ibigin Mo Ako, Lalaking Matapang	Manuel Silos	Jose Padilla, Jr., Tessie Quintana, Delia Razon, Teody Belarmino, Celia Flor, Armando Goyena	LVN Pictures	Romance	
Ilaw sa Landas	Tor Villano	Fred Montilla, Linda Estrella, Guia Imperial	Sampaguita Pictures	Drama	
Ina ng Awa	Consuelo P. Osorio as (Consuelo Osorio)	Carlos Padilla, Sr., Rosa Aguirre, Nora Madrid as (Anita de Castro)	Liwayway Films	Drama	
Kahit Ang Mundo'y Magunaw		Eddie Garcia			
Kampanang Ginto	Gregorio Fernandez	Carmen Rosales, Rogelio de la Rosa, Angge, Gregorio Fernandez, Milagros Naval, Carmencita Palma, Caridad Peñalosa, Ben Rubio, Jose Cris Soto	LVN Pictures	Drama, Romance	
Kaputol ng Isang Awit	Paquito Bolero	Eddie del Mar, Corazon Noble, Vicente Ocampo, Paraluman, Paco Zamora	Sampaguita Pictures	Drama	
Kay Ganda ng Umaga	Ramon Estella	Dely Atay-atayan, Dolly Garcia, Frankie Gordon, Anita Linda, Lopito, Virginia Montes, Enrico Pimentel, Alfonso Reyes, Efren Reyes, Nati Rubi	Premiere Productions	Romance	
Kayumanggi	Leopoldo Salcedo	Leopoldo Salcedo, Esther Magalona, Nora Madrid, Engracio Ibarra, Rino Bermudez, Ding Tello, Pedro Faustino, Tolindoy, Dely Atay-atayan, Luis San Juan, Anita del Prado, Vic Andaya, Maximo Pompling aka (Max Alvarado)	Premiere Productions		
Kidlat sa Silangan	Cesar Gallardo	Rogelio de la Rosa, Leila Morena, Rosa Aguirre, Nena Cardenas, Ramon d'Salva, Pedro Faustino, Enrico Pimentel, Ding Tello, Tessie Villamor, Ramon D'Salva, Luis San Juan, Candida Valderama, Kasupang, Pancho Pelagio, Francisco Cruz, Juan Bautista, Tessie Villamor, Cely Lacson	Premiere Productions	Drama	
Kuba sa Quiapo	Nemesio E. Caravana	Leopoldo Salcedo, Gil de Leon, Mila del Sol, Lou Salvador, Bayani Casimiro, Florentino Ballecer, Alfonso Carvajal, Joseph de Cordova, Carmencita Palma, Salvador Zaragoza	LVN Pictures	Drama	
Kumakaway Ka Pa, Irog	Paquito Bolero	Pacita Francisco, Victor Sevilla, Ester Buenaobra, Fred Peñalosa, Manuel Barbeyto, Amelia Saguimsim, Amelita Sol	Bayani Pictures	Drama, Musical, Romance	
Kumander Sundang	Gerardo de Leon	Rosa del Rosario, Efren Reyes, Fernando Royo, Engracio Ibarra, Amelita Sol, Totoy Torrente, Fred Santos, Dely Atay-atayan, Oscar Obligacion, Ponching de los Reyes, Luis San Juan	Premiere Productions	Action, Drama, War	
Kung Sakali Ma't Salat	Paquito Bolero	Jose Luz Bernardo, Chichay, Anita Linda, Nati Rubi, Victor Sevilla, Amelita Sol	Bayani Pictures	Drama	
Landas ng Buhay	Ben Calasanz, Lake Pangilinan	Rosa Aguirre, Virgilio Araneta, Pacita Corrales, Leonora Cruz, Lirio del Valle, Mina Dy Valle, Justo Guevarra, Hanasan, Lopito, Rosie Lorenzana, Virginia Montes, Carlos Padilla, Sr., Rita Rivera, Eddie San Juan, Carmencita Sotelo	Al Martin Pictures	Drama	
Lihim na Bayani	Ramon A. Estella	Jose Padilla, Jr., Amparo Karagdag, Vic Andaya, Armando Araneta, Antonio de la Moguies, Kasupang, Virginia Montes, Frankie Gordon, Ding Tello, Angel Suntay, Fred Santos, Tony Tolman, Norman Vales	Premiere Productions	Action, Drama, War	first Filipino film about journalists
Lupang Pangako		Leopoldo Salcedo, Mila del Sol, Tino de Lara, Engracio Ibarra, Armando Canseco, Maria Norman, Lila Luna, Vita Ortega, Bayani Casimiro, Angge, Pablo Virtuoso, Eusebio Gomez	LVN Pictures	Drama	
Magkapilas ng Langit	Consuelo P. Osorio as (Consuelo Osorio)	Francisco Cruz, Pedro Faustino, Amparo Karagdag, Ely Ramos	Premiere Productions		
Makabagong Pilipina	Susana C. de Guzman	Rita Amor, Eliseo Carvajal, Bayani Casimiro, Justina David, Tino de Lara, Lilia Dizon	LVN Pictures	Drama	
Maria Beles	Nemesio Caravana	Celia Flor, Armando Goyena, Alfonso Carvajal, Bayani Casimiro, Gil de Leon, Rosa Rosal, Amelita Sol	LVN Pictures	Drama	
Milagro ng Birhen ng mga Rosas		Tita Duran, Pancho Magalona, Alicia Vergel	Sampaguita Pictures	Drama, Romance	
Milyonaria	Susana C. de Guzman	Rogelio de la Rosa, Mila del Sol, Eusebio Gomez, Engracio Ibarra, Justina David, Armando Canseco, Rita Amor, Miguel Lopez, Tomas Esteban, Bayani Casimiro, Menggay	LVN Pictures	Drama, Romance	
Naglahong Tala	Armando de Guzman	Mona Lisa, Jose Luz Bernardo, Reynaldo Dante, Fernando Royo	Supreme	Drama	directorial debut of Armando de Guzman at age 16, considered one of the youngest Filipino directors ever
Nakaripang Kamay	Tor Villano	Van de Leon	Sampaguita Pictures	Drama	
Padre Burgos	Gerardo de Leon	Jaime de la Rosa, Efren Reyes, Virginia Montes, Amelita Sol, Frankie Gordon, Rino Bermudez, Oscar Keesee, Conrado Conde, Dely Atay-atayan, Kasupang, Francisco Conde, Francisco Cruz, Francisco Salcedo, Ermy Faustino, Bebong Osorio, Johnny Reyes, Ester Buenaobra	Premiere Productions	Historical	
Parola	Jose Climaco	Jaime de la Rosa, Norma Blancaflor, Jaime Castellvi, Gil de Leon, Tony Santos, Naty Bernardo, Oscar Obligacion, Priscilla Cellona, Carmencita Palma, Fred Penalosa, Ramon Pello, Gumercindo Buencamino, Pat Salvador, Joseph de Cordova, Ramon Roy, Quiel Segovia	LVN Pictures	Crime	
Pinaghating Isangdaan	Tor Villano	Van de Leon, Eddie del Mar, Paraluman	Sampaguita Pictures	Drama	
Prinsesa Basahan		Rosa Rosal	LVN Pictures		
Prinsipe Paris	Horace Curry	Manuel Conde, Elvira Reyes, Luningning, Frankie Gordon, Jose Villafranca, Juan Urbano, Alfredo Peñalosa, Ely Nakpil, Ric Bustamante, Oscar Sandoval, Noche Twins, Horace Curry, Topy Urbano, Tony Cruz, Caridad Peñalosa, Ben Castillo, Francisco Carel, Bert Intal, Manuel Conde, Jr., Benny Candelaria	MC Productions (as Manuel Conde Productions)	Action, Drama, Fantasy	
Ronquillo: Tiagong Akyat	Lamberto V. Avellana	Jose Padilla Jr., Leila Morena, Ben Perez, Eduardo del Mar, Miguel Anzures, Don Damon, Jose Santiago	Nolasco Bros.	Action, Biopic, Drama	debut film of Jose Santiago
Sagur	Mar I. Esmeralda	Fernando Poe, Mona Lisa, Fernando Royo, Gil de Leon, Luningning, Bimbo Danao, Armando Crisostomo, Cris de Vera, Carol Varga	X'Otic Films	Action	
Sa Piling Mo		Tita Duran			
Simpatika	Octavio Silos	Carmen Rosales, Pancho Magalona	Sampaguita Pictures	Musical, Romance	
Sipag ay Yaman		Eusebio Gomez, Engracio Ibarra, Carmen Rosales	Sampaguita Pictures	Drama	
Siyudad sa Ilalim ng Lupa	Carlos Vander Tolosa	Manuel Barbeyto, Pedro Faustino, Mona Lisa, Fernando Royo, Totoy Torrente, Luningning, Bimbo Danao, Perlan Soliman, Armando Cris, Cris de Vera, Jose Troni, Oscar Obligacion, Matty Torres, Julio Gonzales, Carol Varga	X'Otic Films		Carol Varga was introduced in this film
Suwail (Naglaro ang Ligaya)	Eduardo de Castro	Anita Linda, Reynaldo Dante, Nora Madrid, Lopito, Rino Bermudez, Amelita Sol, Luz Kahanding, Baby Violeta, Rita Baesa, Ramon d'Salva	Premiere Productions	Drama, Romance	Ramon d'Salva was introduced in this film. Serialized in Bulaklak Magazine
Tala sa Umaga	Tor Villano	Tita Duran, Paco Zamora	Sampaguita Pictures	Drama	
Tambol Mayor		Jaime de la Rosa, Pugo, Togo, Tessie Quintana, Lopito, Pablo Virtuoso, Gil de Leon, Horace Curry, Justina David	LVN Pictures	Comedy, Musical	
The 13th Sultan	Eduardo de Castro	Fernando Poe Mona Lisa, Bimbo Danao, Berting Labra, Luningning, Fernando Royo, Carol Varga, Bimbo Danao, Gil de Leon, Cris de Vera	Movietec, X'Otic Films	Action, Adventure	
Ulilang Kalapati	Octavio Silos	Tita Duran, Fred Montilla, Maria Cristina, Eduardo del Mar	Sampaguita Pictures	Drama	
Virginia	Nemesio E. Caravana	Armando Goyena, Tessie Quintana, Rosa Rosal, Tolindoy, Florentino Ballecer, Naty Bernardo, Jose Cris Soto	LVN Pictures	Drama, Romance	
