= List of Filipino comedians =

This is a list of notable Filipino comedians.

Name	Notability	References
Ai-Ai de las Alas	Martina Aileen de las Alas. Called the "Comedy Concert Queen."	
Alex Gonzaga	Catherine Cruz Gonzaga	
Ambet Nabus	Edilberto Rivera Nabus.	
Andoy Balunbalunan	Alejandro Villegas. Husband of Dely Atay-atayan.	
Andrew E	Andrew Espiritu. First attained popularity with his hit single Humanap Ka ng Panget.	
Apeng Daldál	Serafín Gabriél.	
Ariel Ureta	Juan Ariel Muñoz Ureta.	
Aruray	One of the post-war comedy stars along Dely Atay-Atayan, Patsy, Dolphy, and Panchito. Often partnered with Chichay.	
Babalu	Pablito Sarmiento.	
Balót	Jaime Llave.	
Barbie Forteza	Barbara Ambas Forteza.	
Bentot	Arturo Vergara Medina. Well-known for his role as Pugo's sidekick in the radio, later tv, sitcom Tangtarangtang.	
Bert Marcelo	Known for his trademark, high-pitched contagious laugh. He gained prominence as an endorser in the 1980s, lending his comedic appeal to a popular beer commercial.	
Cachupóy		
Canuplín	Canuto Francia. Spoofed Charlie Chaplin.	
Caridád Sanchez	Aside from comedy, she also performed in dramatic roles.	
Chichay	Amparo Robles Custodio.	
Chiquito	Augusto Valdéz Pangan. King Of Pinoy Slapstick Comedy	
Christopher		
Matimtiman Cruz	Maria Josefa Cruz.	
Dagúl	Romeo Pastrana.	
Joey de Leon	José María Ramos de León. Also known as The Henyo Master	
Dely Atay-atayan	Adelaida Marquéz Fernando.	
Dolphy	Rodolfo Vera Quizon. Called the first and original "King of Comedy."	
Esnyr	Known for his natural comedic timing in his TikTok and acting.	
Ethel Booba	Ethel Gabison.	
Eugene Domingo	The Comedy Star for All Seasons. Famous side-kick of comedy queen Ai-Ai.	
Kuya Germs	Also known as German Moreno.	
Ike Lozada	Enrique Lozada.	
Joross Gamboa	John Ross Sanchez Gamboa	
Jose Manalo	Ariel Pagtalonia Manalo.	
Joey Marquez		
John Lapus		
Janno Gibbs		
Keempee de Leon		
Leo Martinez		
Lou Veloso	Luciano Mariano Veloso.	
Marc Logan	Marcelo Logan Ponti Jr.	
Mahal	Noemi Tesorero.	
Michael V.	also known as Bitoy.	
Mura	Allan Padua.	
Nikko Natividad		
Ogie Alcasid	Herminio José Lualhatì Alcasid.	
Ogie Diaz	Roger Diaz Pandaan	
Oscar Obligación		
Dencio Padilla	Dencio Baldivia.	
Palito	Reynaldo Alfredo R. Hipolito.	
Pamu Pamorada		
Panchito	Alfonso D. Tagle.	
Ramón Zamora	Ramón Artiaga Zamora. Made film imitations of Bruce Lee.	
Raymart Santiago		
Redford White	Cipriano Cermeño.	
Richard Gomez		
Roderick Paulate	He is King of Gay comedy	
Pepe Pimentél	José Pimentél. Died 2013.	
Pepot		
Pugak at Tugak	Pugak (Conrado Piring) and Tugak (Perfecto Piñon) were a famous comedy team in the 1950s and early 1960s. Perfecto Piñon later became a well-known painter.	
Pugò	Mariano Contreras. Well-known for his lead role in the radio, later tv, sitcom Tangtarangtang.	
René Requiestas	Renato L. Requiestas.	
Reycard Duet		
Tito Sotto	Vicente Castelo Sotto. An actor, singer, songwriter, TV host, and politician. He was Vice Mayor of Quezon City. Having served two terms as a Senator in the national government, he became nicknamed "Tito Sen."	
Togo	Andres Solomon. Often partnered with Pugò in Pugo and Togo.	
Toni Gonzaga	Celestine Cruz Gonzaga. She is also referred to as "Queen of Philippine Rom-com" and "Ultimate Multimedia Star"	
Vic Sotto	Marvic Castelo Sotto. Also known as bossing & also the Box Office King Of Comedy	
Vice Ganda	Jose Marie Borja Viceral. He is the "Box-office Phenomenal Superstar" and "Unkabogable Star".	
Wally Bayola	Walter James Bayola.	
Willie Revillame	Wilfredo Buendia Revillame. King of Comedy Variety Show. His famous variety shows are Magandang Tanghali Bayan, Masayang Tanghali Bayan, Wowowee, Willing Willie, Wil Time Bigtime, Wowowillie and Wowowin	
Yoyoy Villame	Roman Tesorio Villame. Singer-composer.	

== See also ==
- List of comedians
- Comedy in the Philippines
