= Andrew Solomon (disambiguation) =

Andrew Solomon (born 1963) is an American writer.

Andrew Solomon may also refer to:

- Andrew Solomon, a character from Shortland Street, a New Zealand soap opera

== See also ==
- Solomon Andrews (disambiguation)
- Togo (comedian) (Andres Solomon, 1905–1952), Filipino actor and comedian
