= Carlos Padilla =

Carlos Padilla may refer to:

- Carlos Padilla Sr. (1909–1962), Filipino Olympic boxer and actor
- Carlos Padilla Jr. (born 1934/35), Filipino boxing referee and actor
- Carlos Padilla (footballer) (1934–2014), Honduran footballer and manager
- Carlos Padilla (politician) (1944–2023), Governor of Nueva Vizcaya, Philippines
