= To go =

To go may be:

- an adjective referring to take-out food
- an adjective referring to software with minimalized memory usage for mobile devices
- the verb to go
- To Go (convenience store), an international chain developed by BP and Amoco
- Togo

== See also ==
- Togo
- Tugo
