= Tino de Lara =

Filipino actor

Tino de Lara (born 1917) was a Filipino actor, also known as Tinno de Lara, who was an LVN Pictures supporting player.

He made his first movie under Luis Nolasco Production in 1948's Apat na Panalangin aka Four Prayers.

From then, he made six movies under Lvn Pictures for the next three years, namely: Kambal na Ligaya aka Twin Happiness with Leopoldo Salcedo, Makabagong Pilipina aka Modern Filipina with Lilia Dizon, Camelia with Carmen Rosales, Ang Kandidato with Pugo & Togo, Lupang Pangako aka Promise Land & Magkumparing Putik with Pugo & Togo.

In 1951, he transferred to another movie studio, the Premiere Production, where he made his first and only movie of Sa Oras ng Kasal aka In the Time of Wedding.

== Filmography ==
- 1948 - 4 na Dalangin
- 1948 - Kambal na Ligaya
- 1949 - Makabagong Pilipina
- 1949 - Camelia
- 1949 - Ang Kandidato
- 1949 - Lupang Pangako
- 1950 - Magkumpareng Putik
- 1951 - Sa Oras ng Kasal
