= Naty Bernardo =

Filipino actress

- Born: 25 April 1911; Philippines
- Died: 4 January 1987 (aged 75); Philippines
- Occupations: Film and Stage Actress; Singer

Naty Bernardo (born 25 April 1911 – 4 January 1987) was a Filipino actress with a more than 40 year career. She is known for a variety of roles including as a martyr, character actress, and villain. Singer-songwriter JoAnne Lorenzana is her granddaughter.

== Early life ==
Naty Bernardo was born on April 25, 1911, in the Philippines.

== Early career ==
Bernardo began her career at age 14 as a substitute singer for Sarswela Gabriel in Manila. She became a soloist at the Lotus Theater and had bit parts in Malayan and Filippine movies until 1934 when she received a "second lead" role to Carlos Padilla, Sr. and Ana del Rosario in Sa Tawag ng Diyos (At God’s Call). She also had a major role in Ina (Mother) 1935, Ang Birheng Walang Dambana (Virgin Without a Shrine) in 1937, Siya’y Aking Anak (That Child Is Mine), Tunay na Ina (Real Mother) in 1939, and Mayroon Nga Bang Dios? in 1939. She had "martyr roles" and character roles.

== Later career ==
During the Japanese occupation of World War II she performed in theater before continuing her film career with dozens of films for LVN Studios. Naty's last movie was "Ang Mata Ni Angelita" with the late former child turned teen singer actress Julie Vega in 1978. Naty was retired from showbiz in 1979 up to her sudden death in 1987.

== Personal life ==
Naty's granddaughter was Joanne Lorenzana who's become a successful singer, songwriter, and TV host of GMA Supershow on kapuso TV station GMA Channel 7.

== Death ==
Naty Bernardo died on January 4, 1987, in Manila, Philippines at the age of 76. She was buried at Manila Memorial Park in Sucat.

== Filmography ==
Year	Film
1934	Sa Tawag ng Diyos
1935	Ina
1935	Kalbario
1936	Ang Birheng Walang Dambana
1939	Siya'y Aking Anak
1939	Tunay na Ina
1939	Mayroon Nga Bang Diyos?
1940	Pakiusap
1940	Ave Maria
1941	Ibong Sawi
1946	Garrison 13
1946	Barong-Barong
1946	Angelus
1948	Labi ng Bataan
1948	Sa Tokyo Ikinasal
1948	Manugang at Biyenan
1948	Puting Bantayog
1949	Parola
1949	El Diablo
1949	Virginia
1950	Ang Bombero
1951	Ang Tapis Mo Inday
1951	Bohemyo
1951	Pag-asa
1952	Harana sa Karagatan
1954	3 Sisters
1955	Pilipino Kostum No Touch
1956	Handang Matodas
1956	Puppy Love
1956	Higit sa Korona
1957	Phone Pal
1957	Basta Ikaw
1957	Lelong Mong Panot
1958	Combo Festival
1976	Iniibig Kita... Father Salvador
1979	Ang Mata ni Angelita
