= Lihim ng Lumang Simbahan =

- Directed by: Tor Villano
- Release date: 1940
- Country: Philippines
- Languages: Filipino, Tagalog

Lihim ng Lumang Simbahan is a 1940 Filipino film directed by Tor Villano. It stars Tita Duran, Reynaldo Dante and Luningning.
