= Solomon Andrews =

Solomon Andrews may refer to:

- Solomon Andrews (businessman) (1835–1908), British entrepreneur
- Solomon Andrews (inventor) (1806–1872), American physician, aviator and dirigible airship inventor
