= Ric Bustamante =

Filipino actor

- Resting place: Manila, Philippines
- Known for: Actor

Ric Bustamante, born 1923, is a Filipino actor who portrayed most of his roles as a villain. His first movie was Tayug (Ang Bayang Api) under Pedro Vera Pictures.

He made many notable films with director Manuel Conde, including the 1950 films Siete Infantes de Lara and Genghis Khan.

He made the 1952 religious film Kalbaryo ni Hesus and the 1951 period film Sigfredo under Lebran Pictures.

He also made four films under Everlasting Pictures: the Babaing Mandarambong, Princesa ng Kagubatan, Taong Putik, and Ramir.

== Filmography ==
Year	Title
1947	Tayug (Ang Bayang Api)
1950	Siete Infantes de Lara
1950	Genghis Khan
1951	Sigfredo
1952	Kalbaryo ni Hesus
1954	Salabusab
1956	Simaron
1956	Babaing Mandarambong
1956	Princesa ng Kagubatan
1956	Taong Putik
1957	Kim
1957	Kahariang Bato
1958	Kurangga
1958	Ramir
1959	Amazona
