= Lota Delgado =

Filipino actress

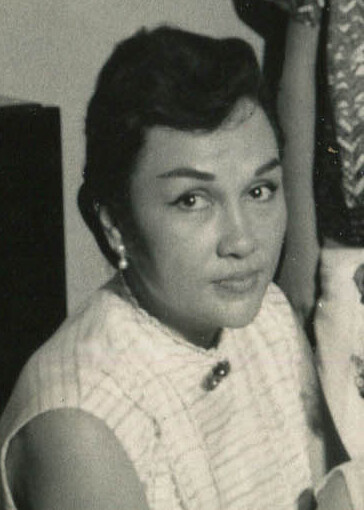
- Delgado in 1974
- Born: Carlota Delgado y Concepción; 19 May 1921; Iloilo City, United States Philippine Islands
- Died: 28 April 2009 (aged 87); Manila, Philippines
- Occupation: Actress
- Spouse: Rogelio dela Rosa (died 1986)
- Relatives: Bimbo Danao (brother-in-law)

Carlota "Lota" Delgado-de la Rosa (19 May 1921 – 28 April 2009) was a Filipino actress noted mostly for her pre-World War II career. She was born in Iloilo City.

She largely stopped acting after marrying fellow actor and future Senator Rogelio dela Rosa.

She died on 28 April 2009 in Manila, Philippines.

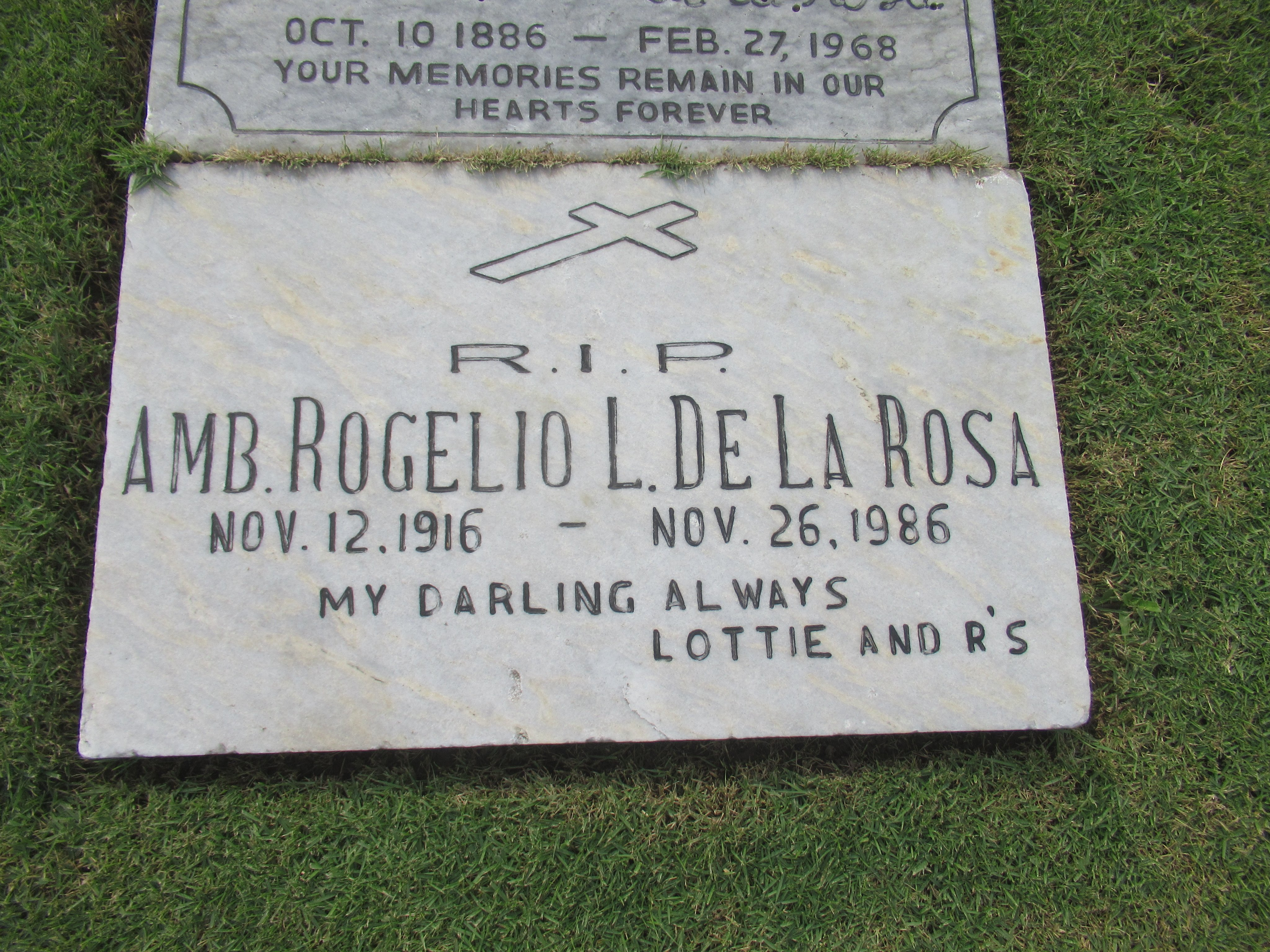
Rogelio de la Rosa with Lota Delgado - Lottie name

== Filmography ==
- Takip-Silim (1939)
- Gunita (1940)
- Katarungan (1940)
- Estrellita (1940)
- Colegiala (1940)
- Nang Mahawi ang Ulap (1940)
- Tarhata (1941)
- Irisan (1952)
