= Pacita del Río =

Filipino actress

- Born: Helen Johnson; September 23, 1921; Manila, Philippine Islands
- Died: November 13, 1989 (aged 68); San Diego, California, U.S.
- Occupation: Actress

Helen Johnson (23 September 1921 - 13 November 1989), better known by her stage name Pacita del Río, was a Filipina actress.

== Personal life ==
Helen Johnson was born in Manila, Philippine Islands (now Philippines) on September 23, 1921. She had one boy, Bernard Johnson. She died in San Diego on November 13, 1989, at the age of 69.

== Filmography ==
- 1938 -Ako'y Maghihintay
- 1939 -Arimunding-Arimunding
- 1939 -Pag-ibig ng Isang Ina
- 1939 -Matamis na Kasinungalingan?
- 1940 -Lihim ng kapatid
- 1940 -Ave Maria
- 1940 -Ikaw Rin
- 1940 -Patawad
- 1940 -Maginoong Takas
- 1940 -Dating Sumpaan
- 1940 -Alitaptap
- 1941 -Ibong Sawi
- 1941 -Carmen
- 1941 -Princesita
- 1941 -Mariposa
- 1941 -Panibugho
- 1941 -Sa Iyong Kandungan
- 1941 -Tampuhan
- 1941 -Palikero
- 1946 -Ligaya
- 1947 -Si, Si...Senorito
- 1947 -Bisig ng Batas
- 1947 -Oh, Salapi!
- 1947 -Anak-Pawis
- 1948 -Waling-Waling
- 1948 -Batang Lansangan
- 1951 -Tres Muskiteros
