= Cris de Vera =

Filipino actor

- Born: 1924; Philippine Islands
- Died: 1975 (aged 50–51); Philippines
- Occupation: Actor
- Years active: 1946-1963

Cris de Vera (1924–1975) was a Filipino actor who was typecast as Japanese in most of his films because of his Japanese features.

De Vera made his first movie after World War II when war struck Manila in Death March, a film by Leopoldo Salcedo with Philippine Pictures, about a Prisoner of War when the Japanese invaded the Philippines and made a Death March from Bataan.

He made only one movie with Sampaguita Pictures titled Maynila aka Manila which co-starred some of the prewar movie players.

== Filmography ==
- 1946 - Death March
- 1946 - Maynila
- 1949 - Krus ng Digma
- 1949 - Siyudad sa Ilalim ng Lupa
- 1949 - Sagur
- 1949 - Kumander Mameng
- 1949 - He Promised to Return
- 1950 - His Darkest Hour
- 1950 - The Pirates Go to Town
- 1950 - The Spell
- 1954 - Selosong Balo
- 1955 - Papa Loves Mambo
