= Nena Cardenas =

Filipino actress (1932–2020)

Nena L. Cardenas
- Born: Filomena L. Cardenas; September 15, 1932
- Died: June 11, 2020 (aged 87); Makati, Philippines
- Occupation: Actress
- Spouse: Arturo L. Bayle

Nena Cardenas, born Remy Cardenas (September 15, 1932 – June 11, 2020), was a Filipino actress.

== Biography ==
Cardenas made her first acting appearance in the drama Kidlat sa Silangan (Lightning on the East) with Premiere Production. She made several movies with this studio, including one appearance with Rogelio dela Rosa in 48 Oras (48 Hours), for which she won the Maria Clara Award.

In 1952, she appeared in the musical drama Bulaklak ng Nayon (Flower of the Field) with Anita Linda, and Bakas ng Kahapon (Footprint of the Past).

She made two movies with Sampaguita Pictures entitled El Indio (The Indie) and Tres Ojos (Three-Eyed), paired with César Ramirez.

Tomboy was her last movie under Filipinas Pictures.

She died on June 11, 2020, due to chronic kidney disease, and senility.

== Filmography ==
- Kidlat sa Silangan (1949)
- Hindi ako Susuko (1949)
- 48 Oras (1950)
- Doble Cara (1950)
- Kamay ni Satanas (1950)
- Munting Anghel (1951)
- Diego Silang (1951)
- Tagailog (1951)
- Malolos (1952)
- Bakas ng Kahapon (1952)
- Bulaklak ng Nayon (1952)
- Tianak (1953)
- El Indio (1953)
- Solitaryo (1953)
- Habang Buhay (1953)
- Takas (1954)
- 3 Sisters (1954)
- Laging May Umaga (1954)
- Tres Ojos (1954)
- Tomboy (1955)
