= Pugo and Togo =

Filipino comedy team

Pugo and Togo were a Filipino comedy team in Philippine movies during the 1940s up to the 1950s. Composed of Mariano Contreras (1910–1978) and Andres Solomon (1905–1952), their brand of humor consisted of short skits, slapstick, and funny dialogues presented in Manila's theaters, most particularly Clover Theater and Avenue Theater. Mariano Contreras starred as Pugo, while Solomon portrayed Togo. They were both bald headed.

== Career ==
Contreras and Solomon started out as the Laurel and Hardy of the Philippines. They began their career as vaudeville performers in the 1930s and were a hit during the Japanese Occupation, during which they poked fun at the Japanese; in that period, they did stage shows and branched out into films before the war. Among the films they made in the early 1940s were Utos ng Hari, Hindi Mababali, Sa Lumang Simbahan and Binibiro Lamang Kita. During the Japanese Occupation, the tandem was renamed Tuguing and Puguing. This was done to avoid confusing Togo with the Prime Minister of Japan Hideki Tōjō during the Japanese Occupation. According to Sinag-tala magazine in 1945, Hanggang Piyer, staged in Manila, has sold ₱50,000 tickets from over 25,000 spectators in a month.

After the war, Pugo and Togo resumed their film career and did several movies for LVN Pictures: Tambol Mayor (co-starring Jaime de la Rosa and Tessie Quintana), Dalawang Prinsipeng Kambal, Magkumpareng Putik (with Lilia Dizon), Ang Kandidato, Nagsaulian ng Kandila, Dalawang Sundalong Kanin and Biglang Yaman. The comic duo also did a radio sitcom, Edong Mapangarap, with Eddie San Jose and Hollywood starlet Joan Page. Contreras and Solomon would continue to appear in films until 1952, with the latter's abrupt death during the filming of Dalawang Sundalong Kanin, which starred also Togo, Nida Blanca, and Nestor de Villa.

== In popular culture ==
- Portrayed by Dindo Divinagracia (Pugo) and Leo Bruno (Togo) in the 2024 television series Pulang Araw.
