= Ricardo Brillantes =

Filipino actor

- Born: 1912; Philippine Islands
- Died: November 1961 (aged 48–49); Philippines
- Other name: Ricky
- Occupations: Actor, film director
- Years active: 1935–1961

Ricardo Brillantes (1912 – November 1961) was a Filipino actor in films made before World War II and also film director and a prominent writer for Bulaklak and Liwayway magazines, who made his first movie under Liwayway Pictures in 1938's Spanish Civil War movie of Mutya ng Katipunan aka Muse of Katipunan.

Brillantes made his first film directorial under Filipinas Pictures in 1950s Batong Buhay and in 1951 under Leopoldo Salcedo Production of Bisig ng Manggagawa.

He stopped making movies in the early 1950s and has never done any film or directorial job. He married Natividad, a town's beauty queen and had six children. He joined politics in 1951 and was elected number one counselor for Caloocan, town of Rizal (now a city) where a street was named after him. He died at the age of 49 in November 1961.

== Filmography ==
- 1938 - Mutya ng Katipunan
- 1939 - Tawag ng Bayan
- 1940 - Lakambini
- 1947 - Bisig ng Batas
- 1947 - Hanggang Langit
- 1947 - Maria Kapra
- 1947 - Tayug (Ang Bayang Api)
- 1948 - Batang Lansangan
- 1948 - Labi ng Bataan
- 1950 - Sundalong Talahib
- 1950 - Batong Buhay (director)
- 1951 - Bisig ng Manggagawa (director)
