= Eddie del Mar =

Filipino actor

- Born: Eduardo Sangalang Magat; 13 October 1919; Candaba, Pampanga, Philippine Islands
- Died: 8 November 1986 (aged 67); Manila, Philippines
- Resting place: Loyola Memorial Park Marikina, Philippines
- Occupations: Actor, screenwriter, director, filmmaker
- Years active: 1945–1986

Eddie del Mar (born Eduardo Sangalang Magat; 13 October 1919 – 8 November 1986), was a Filipino actor, screenwriter, director, and movie producer, particularly noted for his portrayals of Philippine national figures such as Andres Bonifacio, José Rizal, and the fictional Crisostomo Ibarra. He also starred in films with social issue theme.

Del Mar and wife Milagros Amansec Magat (December 12, 1929 – February 10, 2021) are buried at Loyola Memorial Park.

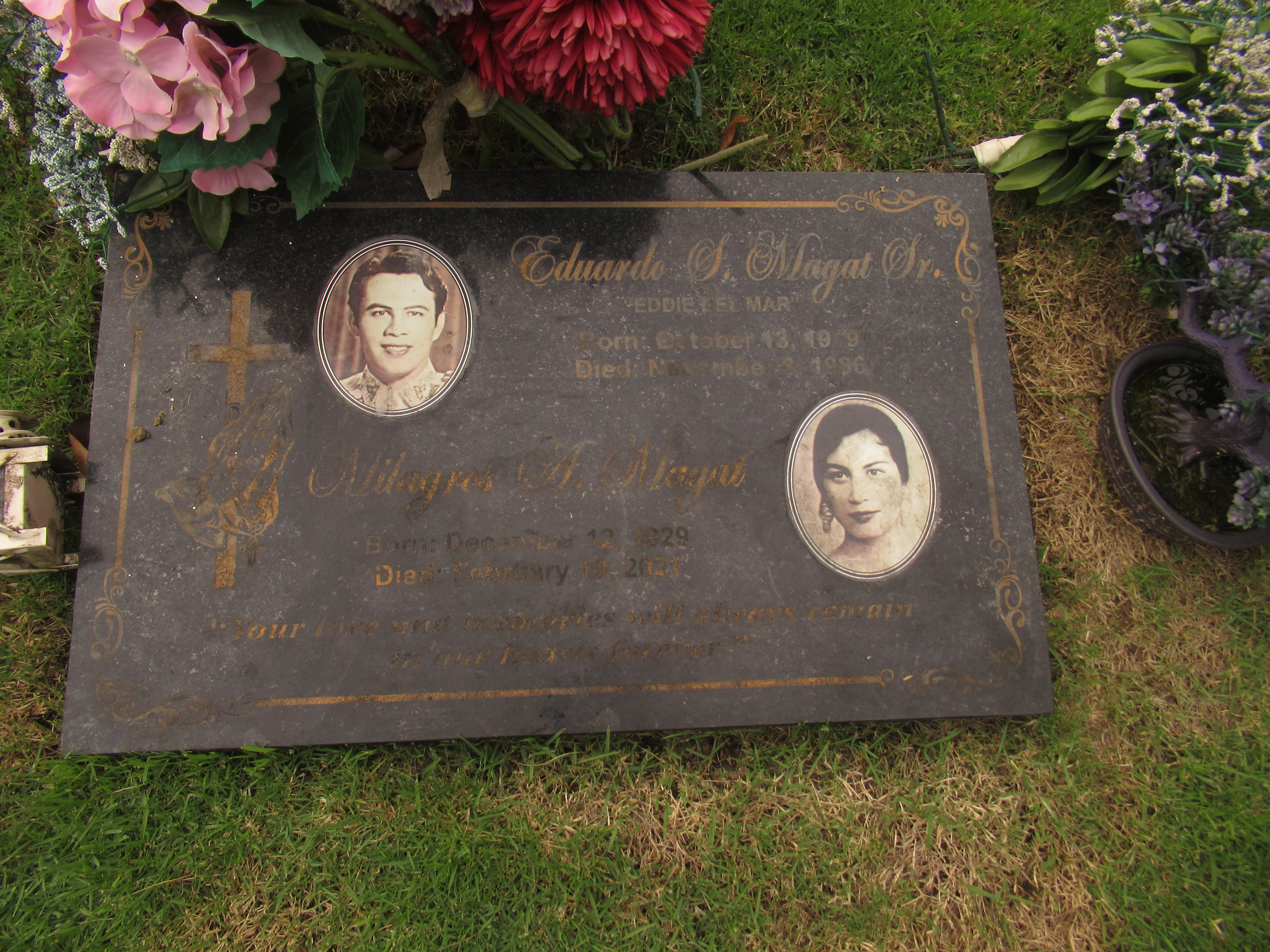
Del Mar-Milagros Amansec Magat (December 12, 1929-February 10, 2021) grave

== Filmography ==
- 1947 – Ang Kapilya sa May Daang Bakal
- 1948 – Kaputol ng Isang Awit
- 1949 – Ulilang Kalapati
- 1949 – Ang Lumang Simbahan
- 1949 – Damit Pangkasal
- 1949 – Pinaghating Isangdaan
- 1949 – Ang Kampeon
- 1950 – Kilabot sa Makiling
- 1950 – Pedro, Pablo, Juan at Jose
- 1950 – Huramentado
- 1950 – The Spell
- 1951 – Makapili
- 1951 – Taimtim na Dalangin
- 1951 – Dinukot
- 1952 – Malolos
- 1952 – Trubador
- 1953 – Agilang Itim
- 1953 – Sa Kamay ng Tadhana
- 1954 – Lourdes
- 1954 – Is My Guy, All Star
- 1954 – Pusong Ginto
- 1954 – Sex Gang
- 1954 – Bandolero
- 1955 – Guerero
- 1955 – Bandilang Pula
- 1955 – Magia Blanca
- 1956 – Santa Lucia, People's
- 1956 – Buhay at Pag-ibig ni Dr. Jose Rizal
- 1957 – Kim
- 1957 – Bicol Express
- 1957 – Reyna Sirkera
- 1957 – Tokyo 1960
- 1958 – Obra-Maestra
- 1958 – Impiyerno sa Paraiso
- 1959 – Kilabot sa Makiling
- 1961 – Noli Me Tángere
- 1962 – Sino ang Matapang
- 1964 – Andres Bonifacio: Ang Supremo
- 1986 – Tinik sa Dibdib
