= Nemesio E. Caravana =

Filipino film director and actor

- Born: 1901
- Died: 1968
- Occupations: Actor; Director

Nemesio E. Caravana (born 1901) was a Filipino film director and actor.

He made a film acting debut in a 1939 Filipino literature story Florante at Laura under Salumbides Co Ltd. He made another two movies as an actor in Sampaguita Pictures' musical Magbalik ka Hirang (Come Back, Darling) and another musical from Salumbides Pictures, Krisantemo (Chrysanthemum).

After World War II, he made his directorial debut in LVN Pictures movie of Kaaway ng Babae (Enemy of Man).

In 1953, he made a movie outside LVN through Premiere Production titled Carlos Trece (Carlos 13), about a mutiny in the Philippines.

== Filmography ==
=== As actor ===
- 1939 - Florante at Laura
- 1940 - Magbalik Ka, Hirang
- 1940 - Krisantemo

=== As director ===
- 1948 - Kaaway ng Babae
- 1949 - Maria Beles
- 1949 - Kuba sa Quiapo
- 1949 - Virginia
- 1950 - Dayang-Dayang
- 1950 - Sohrab at Rustum
- 1951 - David at Goliath
- 1953 - Maria Mercedes
- 1953 - Carlos Trece
- 1953 - Siga-Siga
- 1953 - Kapitan Berong
- 1954 - Ri-Gi-Ding
- 1954 - Ander De Saya
- 1955 - Minera
- 1955 - Ha Cha Cha
- 1955 - El Jugador
- 1955 - Magia Blanca
- 1956 - Prinsipe Villarba
- 1957 - Pabo Real
- 1957 - Prinsipe Alejandre
- 1958 - Batang Piyer
- 1958 - May Pasikat Ba sa Kano?
- 1958 - Ramadal
- 1958 - Wanted: Husband
- 1959 - Mekeni, Abe

=== As writer only ===
- 1952 - Rodrigo de Villa
