= Gil de Leon =

Filipino actor (1919–1992)

Gil de León
- Born: Guillermo Evangelista de León; June 25, 1919; Pasay, Rizal, Insular Government of the Philippine Islands, U.S.
- Died: February 19, 1992 (aged 72); Metro Manila, Philippines
- Occupations: Actor; Director
- Years active: 1946–1980s
- Spouse: Lilia Dizon (m. 1945; sep. 1966)
- Children: Pinky de Leon; Christopher de Leon; Melissa de Leon
- Relatives: Janine Gutierrez (adoptive great-granddaughter); Diego Gutierrez (adoptive great-grandson); Jaden Kristoff de Leon (great-grandson); Jordan de Leon (great-grandson); Ian de Leon (grandson); Gabriel de Leon (grandson); Matet de Leon (adoptive granddaughter); Lotlot de Leon (adoptive granddaughter); Nora Aunor (ex-daughter-in-law); Sandy Andolong (daughter-in-law)

Guillermo Evangelista de León (June 25, 1919 – February 19, 1992), simply known as Gil de León, was a Filipino film actor and director.

== Career ==
De León made his first movie after World War II. The movie is Orasang Ginto aka Golden Clock under LVN Pictures where he stayed in the said company for almost 3 decades.

De León was the first actor to win the FAMAS Best Supporting Actor trophy for Korea. In 1955, he was nominated FAMAS Best Supporting Actor for Sanda Wong.

De León's directorial debut was in Glory at Dawn (1958) under PMP Pictures. He made two movies under MC Production such as Juan Tamad with Manuel Conde and Vende Cristo. He played as a villain and other supporting roles in most of his films. He continued acting up to the 1980s.

== Personal life ==
De León married LVN movie star, Lilia Dizon in 1945 until they separated in the 1966. They have three children, who inherited their talents in acting: Pinky de León, Christopher de León and Lara Melissa de León. Several of his grandchildren and great-grandchildren have also joined show business.

== Death ==
De León died of bone marrow cancer on February 19, 1992, at the age of 72.

== Awards ==
Year	Work	Award	Category	Result	Ref.
1953	Korea	Best Supporting Actor	FAMAS Awards	Won	
1955	Sanda Wong	Best Supporting Actor	FAMAS Awards	Nominated	
1992	—N/a	Ulirang Artista Award	PMPC Awards for Movies	Won	

== Filmography ==
- 1946 - Orasang Ginto
- 1946 - Garrison 13
- 1947 - Kamagong
- 1947 - Si Juan Tamad
- 1947 - Caprichosa
- 1947 - Binatang Maynila
- 1947 - Pangarap ko'y Ikaw Rin
- 1947 - Hacendera
- 1948 - Krus ng Digma
- 1948 - Matimtiman
- 1948 - Siete Dolores
- 1948 - Mga Busabos ng Palad
- 1948 - Vende Cristo
- 1949 - Parola
- 1949 - Maria Beles
- 1949 - Tambol Mayor
- 1949 - Kuba sa Quiapo
- 1949 - Sagur
- 1949 - Dasalang Ginto
- 1949 - Biglang Yaman
- 1950 - Florante at Laura – Horacio
- 1950 - Nuno sa Punso
- 1950 - Doble Cara
- 1951 - Ang Tapis Mo Inday
- 1951 - Reyna Elena
- 1951 - Sigfredo
- 1951 - Bohemyo
- 1951 - Dalawang Prinsipeng Kambal
- 1951 - Romeo at Julieta
- 1952 - Korea
- 1952 - Kambal-Tuko
- 1952 - Taong Paniki
- 1953 - Philippine Navy
- 1953 - Kuwintas ng Pasakit
- 1953 - Squatter
- 1953 - Dagohoy
- 1953 - Hiyasmin
- 1954 - Krus Na Bakal
- 1954 - Donato
- 1955 - Sanda Wong
- 1957 - Objective: Patayin si Magsaysay
- 1958 - Glory at Dawn (dir)
- 1958 - Hanggang sa Dulo ng Daigdig
- 1960 - Awit ng Mga Dukha
- 1976 - Ang Daigdig Ay Isang Patak Na Luha
- 1983 - Of the Flesh
- 1988 - Kapag Napagod ang Puso
- 1988 - Sandakot Na Bala
- 1989 - Oras-Oras, Araw-Araw
