= Erlinda Cortes =

Filipina actress

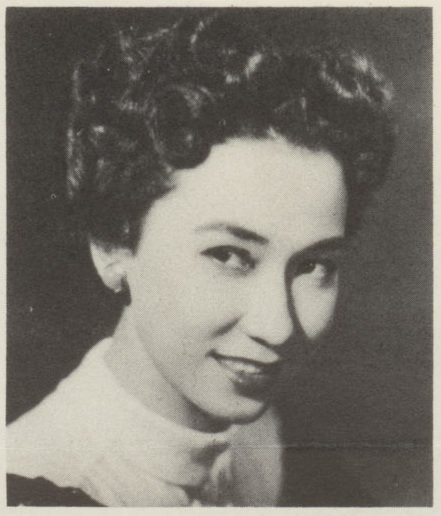
- Cortes in 1953
- Born: Mary Boone; January 5, 1924; San Pablo, Laguna, the Philippine Islands, U.S.
- Died: September 8, 2015; Vermont, U.S.

Mary Boone (January 5, 1924 – September 8, 2015), known by her screen name Erlinda Cortes, was a Filipina actress after World War II who later became the favorite leading lady of postwar actor Angelus.

== Filmography ==
- 1946 — Angelus
- 1946 — Ang Prinsipeng Hindi Tumatawa
- 1947 — Dalawang Anino
- 1947 — Multo ni Yamashita
- 1947 — Backpay
- 1947 — Anak-Pawis
- 1948 — Itanong mo sa Bulaklak
- 1948 — Callejon
- 1949 — He Promised to Return
- 1950 — His Darkest Hour
- 1950 — The Spell
- 1950 — American Guerilla in the Philippines
- 1951 — Sigfredo
- 1951 — Rosario Cantada
- 1951 — Apoy na Ginatungan
- 1951 — Isinanlang Pag-ibig
- 1951 — Romeo at Julieta
- 1953 — May Isang Tsuper ng Taxi
- 1953 — Walang Hanggan
