= Linda Estrella =

Filipina actress

- Born: Consuelo Vera Rigotti; December 3, 1922; Pandan, Albay, Philippine Islands, U.S.
- Died: February 18, 2012 (aged 89); Hobart, Indiana, U.S.
- Occupation: Actress
- Years active: 1941–1970
- Spouse: Adriano Acgoili Agana (m. 1941)
- Children: 3 (incl. Tessie Agana)

Consuelo Vera Rigotti (December 3, 1922 – February 18, 2012), professionally known as Linda Estrella, was a Filipina actress and singer, best known as one of the players of Sampaguita Pictures.

== Biography ==
Consuelo Vera Rigotti was born on December 3, 1922, to Jose Rigotti y Alcalá, a Filipino of Italian descent from Albay, and a Filipina mother, Francisca Vera from Catanduanes. She grew up in Catanduanes and when they moved to Manila, she obtained a degree in Home Economics at Philippine Women's University.

Her uncle was Judge Jose Vera the founder of Sampaguita Pictures and filmmaker Marichu Vera-Perez is her niece. She married Dr. Adriano Acgoili Agana on June 8, 1941. She had three children, Tessie Agana, Cynthia, who died from pneumonia 12 days after birth, and Maria (Marilou) Lourdes, who was adopted by the Aganas.

== Death ==
She died on February 18, 2012, in Hobart, Indiana, aged 89.

== Filmography ==
Films

- 1941 - Princesita
- 1946 - Garrison 13
- 1946 - Voice of Freedom
- 1946 - Dalawang Daigdig
- 1947 - Maria Kapra
- 1948 - Dalawang Dambana
- 1948 - Awit ng Bulag
- 1948 - Outrages of the Orient
- 1948 - Vende Cristo
- 1948 - Labi ng Bataan
- 1948 - Krus ng Digma
- 1948 - Hindi Kita Malimot
- 1948 - Beast of the East
- 1949 - Ilaw sa landas
- 1949 - Apoy sa langit
- 1950 - Campo O'Donnell
- 1950 - Mga Baguio Cadets
- 1950 - Makasalanang Banal
- 1950 - 13 Hakbang
- 1951 - Kasaysayan ni Dr. Ramon Selga
- 1951 - Batas ng daigdig
- 1951 - Walang Gulat
- 1951 - Anghel ng Pag-ibig
- 1952 - Mayamang Balo
- 1952 - Lihim ng Kumpisalan
- 1952 - Kerubin
- 1952 - Hiram na mukha
- 1952 - Hihintayin kita
- 1952 - Kasaysayan ni Rudy Concepcion
- 1952 - Teksas, Ang Manok na Nagsasalita
- 1953 - Munting koronel
- 1954 - Milyonarya at Hampaslupa
- 1954 - Nagkita si Kerubin at si Tulisang Pugot
- 1954 - Kung Ako'y Maging Dalaga
- 1954 - ...At Sa Wakas
- 1955 - Bandilang Pula
- 1956 - Pampanggenya
- 1969 - 9 Teeners
