= Ramon A. Estella =

- Born: Ramon Antonio Estella; 13 August 1911; Philippines
- Died: 4 May 1991 (aged 79); Philippines
- Other names: Ramon A. Estella
- Occupation(s): Movie director actor
- Years active: 1933–1965
- Parent: Jose Estella

Ramon A. Estella (13 August 1911 – 4 May 1991) son of Filipino composer Jose Estella, was a pre-war Philippines movie director and actor. At the age of 27 years old, he started directing his first film, "Bayan at Pagibig,” in 1938 and in 1941, he was proclaimed Director of the Year by Philippine Cinema and Radio because of the success of his assigned project, "Buenavista". During the 1950s, Estella started his career as a neo-realist painter which later in 1959, had his first solo exhibition at the Philippine Art Gallery. He spent his entire life in Florida with his Japanese wife and his last recorded visit to the country was during the Manila International Film Festival in 1981.

== Filmography ==
- 1933 – Ang Punyal na Ginto (actor)
- 1938 – Bayan at Pag-ibig [Excelsior] (dir)
- 1939 – Ruisenor [Parlatone]
- 1940 – Buenavista ? (dir)
- 1942 – Huling Habilin ?
- 1941 – Kundiman [Excelsior]
- 1941 – Singsing na Pangkasal [Acuna-Zaldariaga]
- 1941 – Paraiso [Excelsior] (dir)
- 1941 – Ilang-Ilang [Lvn] (dir)
- 1946 – Angelus [Lvn] (dir)
- 1947 – Caprichosa [Premiere] (dir)
- 1948 – Ang Anghel sa Lupa [Premiere] (dir)
- 1948 – Perfidia [Premiere] (dir)
- 1948 – Labi ng Bataan [Premiere] (dir)
- 1948 – Hiram na Pangalan [Premiere] (dir)
- 1949 – Lihim na Bayani [Premiere] (dir)
- 1949 – Kay Ganda ng Umaga [Premiere] (dir)
- 1949 – Dugo ng Katipunan [Premiere] (dir)
- 1950 – Sundalong Talahib [Filipinas] (dir)
- 1950 – Kenkoy [Premiere] (dir)
- 1950 – Punglo at Pag-ibig [Premiere] (dir)
- 1950 – Bandido [Premiere] (dir)
- 1950 – Prinsipe Don Juan [Premiere] (dir)
- 1956 – Desperado [People's] (dir)
- 1956 – Buhay at Pag-ibig ni Dr. Jose Rizal [Balatbat & Bagumbayan] (dir)
- 1957 – Kim [C.Santiago Film Org] (dir)
- 1958 – Sta. Rita de Casia [Premiere] (dir)
- 1958 – Ramir [Everlasting] (dir)

== Filmography in Singapore / Malaya ==
1. 1957 / Kembali Saorang / One Came Back / Ramon Estella / Malay Film Productions

2. 1958 / Anak Pontianak / Son of Pontianak / Ramon Estella / Malay Film Productions

3. 1958 / Matahari/ The Rape of Malaya / Ramon Estella / Malay Film Productions

4. 1959 / Saudagar Minyak Urat / Love Crazy / Ramon Estella / Malay Film Productions

5. 1959 / Samseng / Gangster / Ramon Estella / Malay Film Productions

6. 1963 / Raja Bersiong / King of Dracula / Ramon Estella / Cathay-Keris

7. 1963 / Darah-Ku / My Blood / Ramon Estella / Maria Menado Productions, Cathay-Keris

8. 1963 / Bunga Tanjong / Cape of Flowers / Ramon Estella/ Maria Menado Productions, Cathay-Keris

9. 1964 / Pontianak Kembali / The Pontianak Returns / Ramon Estella / Maria Menado Productions, Cathay-Keris

10. 1964 / Melanchong ka-Tokyo / Holiday in Tokyo / Ramon Estella / Malay Film Productions

11. 1964 / Dupa Chendana / The Enchanted Island / Ramon Estella / Malay Film Productions

12. 1965 / Pusaka Pontianak / The Accursed Heritage / Ramon Estella / Malay Film Productions
