= Nela Álvarez =

Filipino actress (1919–2009)

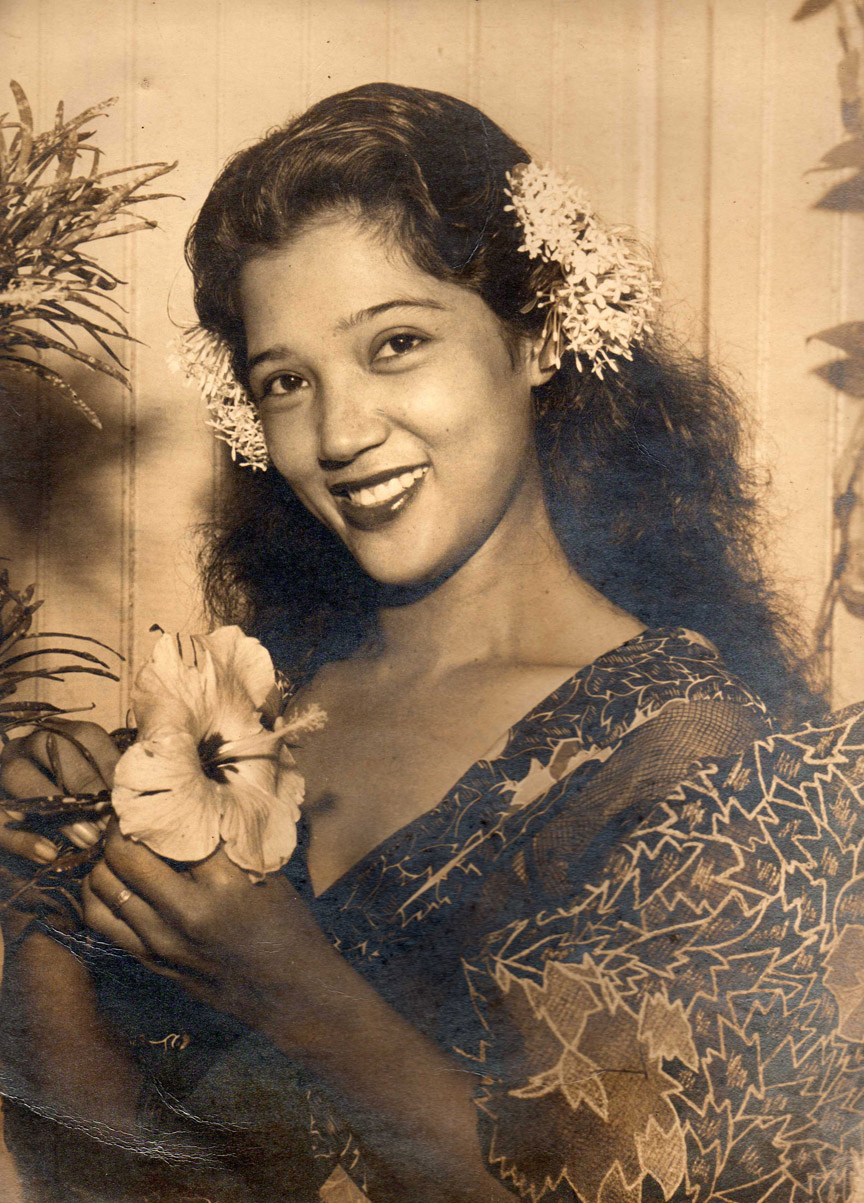
- Born: Manuela Álvarez; November 9, 1919; Carigara, Leyte, Insular Government of the Philippine Islands, U.S.
- Died: March 6, 2009 (aged 89); San Francisco, California, U.S.
- Occupation: Actress
- Years active: 1936–1941, 1948–1981
- Spouse: Jose P. Rocha
- Children: 5 (inc. Rebecca Rocha)
- Relatives: Niño Muhlach (grandson); Alonzo Muhlach (great-grandson)

Manuela "Nela" Álvarez-Rocha (November 9, 1919 – March 6, 2009) was a Filipina softball athlete and film actress who usually played a mother role in LVN Pictures. She is a grandmother of actor and former child star Niño Muhlach through her daughter, former actress Rebecca Rocha.

== Early life ==
Manuela Álvarez was born on November 9, 1919, in Carigara, Leyte, Philippines. She was the youngest child of Julio and Juana Álvarez, who had one son, Salvador, and two other daughters, Benigna and Solita. Julio and Juana raised their children in Manila, where they owned a general and bicycle store.

== Acting career ==
After graduating from high school, she and a friend started auditioning for acting roles in movies. Under the screen name of Nela Álvarez, she immediately got a part as a bit player. In the late 1930s, before the onset of World War II, American-occupied Philippines had an insatiable appetite for movies, which led to the formation of LVN Pictures and other film studios.

In 1936, Alvarez was featured in her first film, Mga Kaluluwang Napaligaw (lit: Lost Souls). She continued to act in six more movies before the Philippines was plunged into World War II. Alvarez did not act again until 1948, when she was featured in Sierra Madre: Bundok ng Hiwaga with Leopoldo Salcedo and Vida Florante. In 1971, she was featured in Jezebel with her daughter, Rebecca.

== Sports career ==
Besides acting, Alvarez was the star catcher for one of the first women’s softball teams in the Philippines. When a team of touring American Major League Baseball players visited Manila, Nela was chosen by her team to catch the ceremonial first pitch from Babe Ruth.

== Personal life ==
She met her husband, Jose P. Rocha, at a softball game in 1935, and three years later, she eloped with him and got married at the Manila Cathedral. They had five children, the eldest dying at a young age of meningitis. Nela's husband, Jose, died in 1982. He taught American government and physical education at Far Eastern University in the Philippines. She was the maternal grandmother of Filipino actor Niño Muhlach, whose lineage on his father's side is also heavily involved in the Philippine acting industry. His aunt is Amalia Fuentes, and his first cousin is Aga Muhlach.

== Filmography ==
- 1936: Mga Kaluluwang Napaligaw
- 1937: Umaraw sa Hatinggabi
- 1937: Sanga-Sangang Dila
- 1937: Via Crucis
- 1938: Bulaklak ng Luha
- 1938: Dahil sa Pag-ibig
- 1948: Sierra Madre: Bundok ng Hiwaga
- 1949: Capas
- 1949: Haiskul
- 1950: Candaba
- 1953: Tatlong Labuyo
- 1953: Babaing Kalbo (Lebran Pictures)
- 1954: Krus na Bakal
- 1957: Hukom Roldan
- 1967: Ang Langit ay Para sa Lahat
- 1968: Magpakailan Man
- 1968: Johnny Do or Die
- 1970: Renee Rose
- 1971: Living Doll
- 1971: Jezebel
- 1973: Hanggang sa Kabila ng Daigdig
