= Lilia Dizon =

Filipino actress (1927–2020)

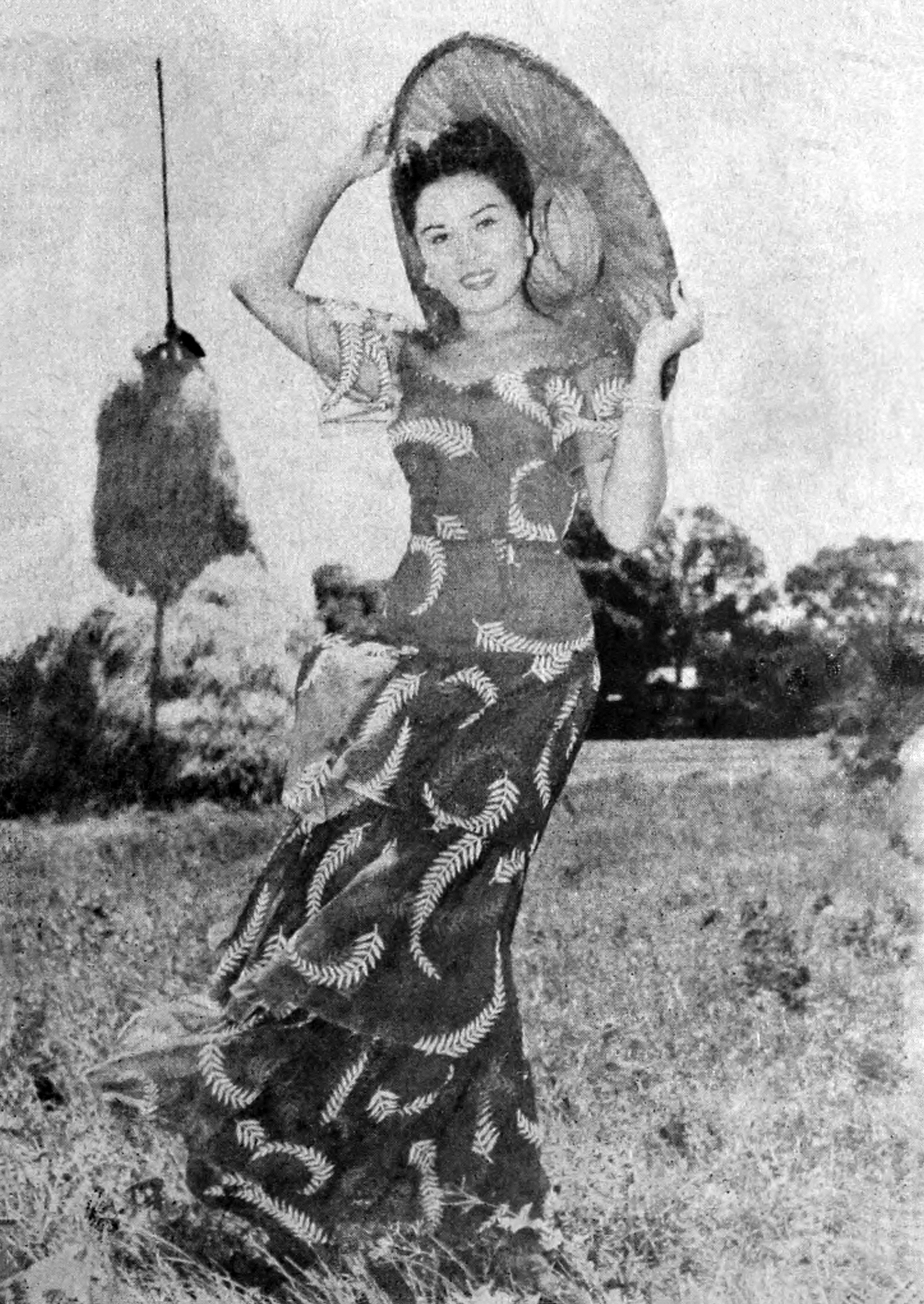
- Lilia Dizon in 1954
- Born: Claire Strauss y Dizon; November 25, 1927; Pampanga, Insular Government of the Philippine Islands, U.S.
- Died: June 15, 2020 (aged 92); Manila, Philippines
- Occupation: Actress
- Years active: 1946–1976, 2003-2007
- Spouse: Gil de León (m. 1945; sep. 1966)
- Children: Pinky de Leon; Christopher de Leon; Melissa de Leon
- Relatives: Lotlot de Leon (adopted granddaughter); Matet de Leon (adopted granddaughter); Gabriel de Leon (grandson); Janine Gutierrez (adopted great granddaughter); Sandy Andolong (daughter-in-law); Nora Aunor (ex-daughter-in-law)

Claire Dizon Strauss (November 25, 1927 – June 15, 2020), known professionally as Lilia Dizon, was a Filipino actress whose career spanned three decades. She began her career as an actress in mid-1940s and became one of the leading actresses of the 1950s. She was awarded Best Actress at the Asia-Pacific Film Festival for her role in Kandelerong Pilak (1954).

== Personal life ==
She was the only daughter of Regina Dizon, a Filipino, and Abraham "Abe" Strauss, an American of German Jewish descent.

At the age of 15, she and her mother relocated to Manila from Baguio following the Second World War and after her father left for America. She started performing in theater under the stage name "Carol Strauss".

She married LVN Pictures actor Gil de León, with whom she had three children who would also become actors as well: Pinky de León, Christopher de León and Melissa de León. With her second husband, Antonio V. Abad, she had two daughters: Toni Abad and Cori Abad. She retired from show business in the 1980s.

== Selected filmography ==
- 1946 – Probinsiyana
- 1947 – Bakya mo Neneng
- 1947 – Kamagong
- 1947 – Binatang Maynila
- 1947 – Pangarap ko'y Ikaw Rin
- 1947 – Violeta
- 1947 – Ina
- 1948 – Engkantada
- 1948 – Kaaway ng Babae
- 1948 – Kambal na Ligaya
- 1948 – Krus na Bituin
- 1948 – Perfidia
- 1948 – Maestro Pajarillo
- 1949 – Makabagong Pilipina
- 1950 – Magkumpareng Putik
- 1950 – Tininti del Barrio
- 1950 – Sohrab at Rustum
- 1951 – Pulo ng Engkantada
- 1951 – Venus
- 1951 – Dugo sa Dugo
- 1951 – Haring Cobra
- 1952 – Bathaluman
- 1953 – Itinakwil
- 1953 – Kuwintas ng Pasakit
- 1953 – Sa Paanan ng Bundok
- 1953 – Makabuhay
- 1954 – Tucydides
- 1954 – Doce Pares
- 1954 – Ikaw ang Buhay Ko
- 1954 – Kandilerong Pilak
- 1955 – Sanda Wong
- 1956 – Simaron
- 1956 – Umaalong Ginto
- 1957 – Kandilang Bakal
- 1958 – Glory at Dawn
- 1958 – Sisang Tabak
- 1961 – The Moises Padilla Story
- 1974 – Tinimbang Ka Nguni't Kulang (Weighed But Found Wanting)

== Death ==
Dizon died on June 15, 2020, at the age of 92 of complications from metastasis lung cancer. Her remains were cremated and wake held at Heritage Memorial Park in Taguíg.
