= Reynaldo Dante =

Filipino actor

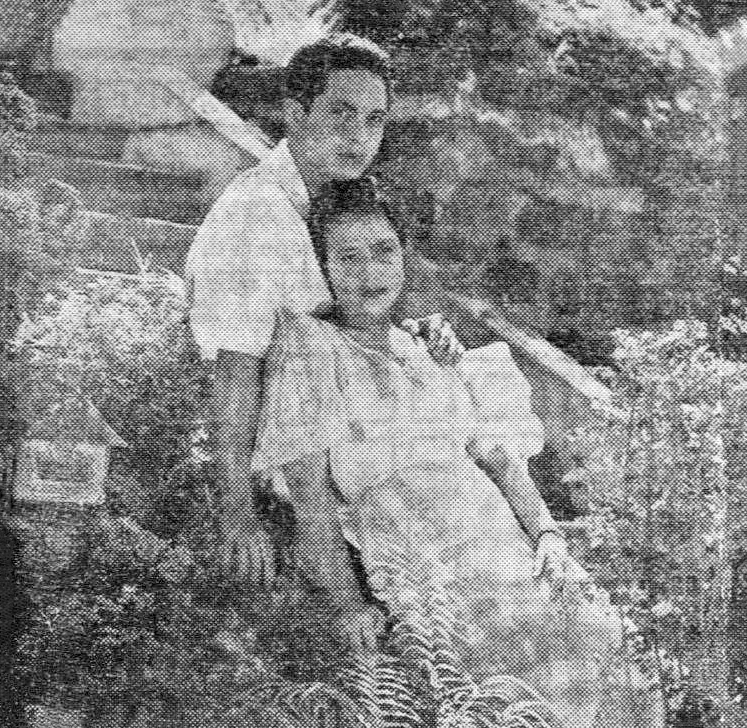
- Reynaldo Dante (left) and Gloria Imperial, c. 1939
- Born: 13 March 1912; Philippines
- Died: 10 February 1985 (aged 72)
- Occupation: Actor

Reynaldo Dante (March 13, 1912 – February 10, 1985) was a Filipino actor.

== Filmography ==
- 1938: Carmelita
- 1938: Celia at Balagtas
- 1938: Dalagang Luksa
- 1938: Dolores
- 1939: Magkaisang Landas
- 1939: Tatlong Pagkabirhen
- 1939: Langit sa Karimlan
- 1939: Ang Kaban ng Tipan
- 1940: Lihim ng Lumang Simbahan
- 1940: Dugo ng Alipin
- 1940: Patawad
- 1941: Angelita
- 1947: Hagibis
- 1948: Ang Anghel sa Lupa
- 1949: Bakit Ako Luluha?
- 1949: Alamat ng Perlas na Itim
- 1949: Naglahong Tala
- 1949: Suwail
- 1950: Tubig na Hinugasan
- 1950: Kamay ni Satanas
- 1951: Labis na Pagtitipid
- 1951: Sisa
- 1953: Malapit sa Diyos
- 1954: Guwapo
- 1956: Heneral Paua
- 1957: Kandilang Bakal
