= Canuplin =

Filipino entertainer

- Born: Canuto Francia; January 28, 1904; Tondo, Manila, Philippine Islands
- Died: September 4, 1979 (aged 75); Metro Manila, Philippines
- Occupations: Filipino stage performer and magician
- Years active: 1915–1950s

Canuto Francia (January 28, 1904 – September 4, 1979), better known as Canuplin, was a Filipino stage performer and magician who gained fame for his impersonation of Charlie Chaplin in Filipino movies and the local bodabil circuit.

== Biography ==
Canuplin was born in Tondo, Manila, but grew up in Divisoria. At age 11, he won "best in costume" while dressed as Chaplin in a local fair. As his prize, he was employed as a barker at a circus. Soon, he was featured in the circus as a magician's assistant, and he learned to perform magic tricks as well.

== Early career ==
Canuplin was noticed by the bodabil producer Lou Salvador, Sr. and hired as a Chaplin impersonator. He gained fame performing his Chaplin act and various magic tricks on the Manila bodabil circuit, appearing alongside stars such as Patsy and Bayani Casimiro. He also ventured into such films as Tinig ng Pag-ibig (1940), Luksang Bituin (1941) and Princesa Urduja (1942). One of his most notable roles was as the court jester in the 1941 LVN Pictures production of Ibong Adarna. In many of his films, Canuplin would appear in his Chaplin guise, wordless as was the silent film star.

== Later career ==
During the Japanese occupation of the Philippines, film production was halted and Canuplin returned as a headliner in bodabil. He performed at the Life, Capitol and The Avenue theaters. After the war, he appeared in several other films until the 1950s.

Canuplin ended his entertainment career at the bodabil circuit where he remained until its waning years in the sixties. His last years were spent in relative obscurity in Tondo, though still recognized by his peers.

His last movie was Burlesk Queen, released in 1977, with the actress Vilma Santos.

== Death ==
Canuplin died on September 4, 1979, in Manila, Philippines at the age of 75.

== Legacy ==
After his death, the playwright Manny Pambid wrote a play, Canuplin, on the bodabil star's rise and fall. It was staged by the Philippine Educational Theater Association in May 1980.

== Filmography ==
- 1930 – Collegian Love
- 1940 – Tinig ng Pag-ibig
- 1941 – Luksang Bituin
- 1941 – Kung Kita'y Kapiling
- 1942 – Princesa Urduja
- 1947 – Dalawang Anino
- 1948 – Waling-Waling
- 1950 – Tubig na Hinugasan
- 1955 – Salamangkero
- 1961 – Operetang Sampay Bakod
- 1977 – Burlesk Queen
