= Pugo (comedian) =

Filipino actor, comedian and director

- Born: Mariano Contreras; July 12, 1910
- Died: December 12, 1978 (aged 68); Manila, Philippines
- Resting place: Manila Memorial Park, Parañaque, Philippines
- Relatives: Antonio P. Contreras (grandson)

Comedy career
- Years active: 1938–1978
- Medium: Film, vaudeville, television

Mariano Contreras (July 12, 1910 – December 12, 1978), better known by his stage name Pugo, was a Filipino actor, comedian, vaudevillian, and film director, famous part of the comedy duo Pugo and Togo during the 1930s up to 1950s. He was sometimes credited as Mang Nano and was known as the original King of Philippine Comedy.

Contreras performed in movies such as Nukso ng Nukso, released in 1960, 2 Sundalong Kanin (1952), and Kambal Tuko (1952), in which he portrayed Momoy. He was also a film director and has worked on Kababalaghan o Kabulastugan?, released in 1960.

After his comedy partner Togo's death in 1952, Contreras teamed up with Bentot in movies, radio and television. His popular TV shows were Tangtarangtang, Si Tatang Kasi, and Wanted Boarders.

== Death ==
Contreras died on December 12, 1978, in Manila, Philippines, at the age of 68.

== In popular culture ==
- Portrayed by Dindo Divinagracia in the 2024 television series Pulang Araw.

== Filmography ==
- Dash a Lotsa Nonsents! Tang Tarang Tang II (1978)
- Kaming Matatapang ang Apog (1976) as Prof. Bokalini
- Yolindina (1975)
- Son of Fung Ku (1975)
- O...Anong Sarap! (Isa Pa Nga) (1975)
- Drakula Goes to R.P. (1973)
- Blood Compact (1972)
- Si Inday sa Balitaw (1970)
- Pitong James Bonds (1966)
- Miting de Avance (1963)
- Pitong Pasiklab sa Pulitika (1963)
- Ang Tatay Kong Kalbo (1963)
- Pitong Pasiklab sa Bahay Na Tisa (1963)
- Pitong Pasiklab sa PC (1962)
- Anting-Anting Daw (1962)
- Tang-Tarang-Tang (1962)
- Pitong Pasiklab (1962) as Asintado
- Puro Labis Puro Kulang (1962)
- Lalaban Kami (1961)
- Baby Damulag (1961)
- Triplets (1961)
- Oh Sendang (1961)
- Prinsipe Diomedes at ang Mahiwagang Gitara (1961)
- Tres Mosqueteros (1960)
- Nukso nang Nukso (1960)
- Yantok Mindoro (1960)
- Manananggal vs. Mangkukulam (1960)
- Puro Utos, Puro Utos (1959)
- Combo Festival (1958)
- Casa Grande (1958)
- Hiwaga ng Pag-Ibig (1958)
- Mr. Kuripot (1958)
- Tuloy ang Ligaya [Happiness Must Go On] (1958)
- Sebya, Mahal Kita (1957)
- Si Meyor Naman (1957)
- Golpe de Gulat (1954)
- Ganyan Lang ang Buhay (1953)
- Tumbalik na Daigdig (1953)
- Kambal Tuko (1952) as Momoy
- 2 Sundalong Kanin (1952)
- Dalawang Prinsipeng Kambal (1951)
- Pulo ng Engkantada (1951)
- Doctor X (1950)
- Edong Mapangarap (1950)
- Nagsaulian ng Kandila (1950)
- Bulakenyo (1949)
- Ang Kandidato (1949)
- Biglang Yaman (1949) as Mariano
- Tambol Mayor (1949)
- Sorry Na Lang (1947)
- Multo ni Yamashita (1947)
- Noong Bata Pa si Sabel [When Sabel Was Young] (1947)
- Ang Estudyante (1947)
- Daily Doble (1947)
- Tomadachi "Zona" (1946)
- Awit ni Palaris (1946)
- Barong-Barong (1946)
- Death March (1946)
- Hanggang Pier (1946)
- Ikaw Na! (1946)
- Binibini ng Palengke (1941)
- Binibiro Lamang Kita (1941)
- Serenata sa Nayon (1941)
- Alitaptap (1940)
- Cadena de Amor (1940)
- Dugo ng Alipin (1940)
- Lihim ng Lumang Simbahan (1940)
- Patawad (1940)
- Azucena (1939)
- Kuwintas Na Ginto (1939)
- Ako'y Maghihintay (1938)
- Arimunding-Munding (1938)
