= Bimbo Danao =

Filipino actor

- Born: 1915
- Died: June 23, 1967 (aged 51–52)
- Occupation: Singer
- Spouse(s): Isa Delgado; Keiko Awaji

Rodrigo Custodio Danao, professionally known as Bimbo Danao (1915 – July 23, 1967) was a Filipino singer.

== Profile ==
He was married to actress Isa Delgado, with whom he had three daughters. He later married Japanese actress Keiko Awaji and had two sons with her. Danao was LVN's lead actor on the post-war years and rose to fame as a Filipino crooner. He also became known in Japan, where he spent part of his career.

== Filmography ==
- 1937 - Nasaan ka, Irog
- 1946 - Orasang Ginto
- 1946 - Alaala Kita
- 1946 - Orasang Ginto
- 1947 - Ikaw ay Akin
- 1948 - 4 na Dalangin
- 1948 - Krus ng Digma
- 1948 - Siete Dolores
- 1948 - Mga Busabos ng Palad
- 1949 - Sagur
- 1949 - The 13th Sultan
- 1957 - Turista
