= Oscar Obligacion =

Filipino comedian

- Born: Oscar Obligacion; January 21, 1924; Manila, Philippine Islands
- Died: February 26, 2010 (aged 86); Quezon City, Philippines
- Other names: Oca
- Occupations: actor, comedian
- Years active: 1949–1997
- Known for: Pantarorong and Kumang
- Spouse: Myrna Anderson-Quizon

Oscar Obligacion (January 21, 1924 – February 26, 2010) was a Filipino comedian. He was known as Pantarorong and Kumang.

== Early life ==
He was born on January 21, 1924, in Manila.

== Personal life ==
He married his wife, Myrna Anderson Quizon, and lived in the States with their children after retiring from showbiz.

== Filmography ==
=== Film ===
Year	Title	Role
1949	Bakit Ako Luluha?	
1949	Parola	Emong
1949	Capas	
1952	Korea	
1958	Walang Takot	
1958	Alembong	
1959	Tuko sa Madre Kakaw	
1961	Tacio	
1962	Sakay and Moy	Moy
1963	Magtiis Ka Darling!	
1966	The Jukebox Queen	
1981	Boogie	
1997	Biyudo Si Mommy, Biyuda Si Daddy	Tiyo Kiko

=== Television ===
Year	Title	Role
1962–1968	Oras ng Ligaya	
1967–1972	The Big Show	
1995–1997	Okay Ka, Fairy Ko!	Laviok

== Death ==
Obligacion died from a lingering illness on February 26, 2010, at the age of 86. He had been suffering from a heart disease and diabetes while undergoing dialysis in his final days.
