= Carlos Padilla Sr. =

Filipino boxer

- Born: Carlos Pedro Eugenio Ruiz Padilla; September 6, 1909; Manila, Philippines
- Died: March 8, 1964 (aged 54)
- Spouse: Melania Dolorico
- Children: Carlos Padilla Jr.
- Parent(s): José Padilla Sr. (father); María Clara Ruiz (mother)

Carlos Pedro Eugenio Ruiz Padilla Sr. (Tagalog pronunciation: [paˈdilja]; September 6, 1909 – March 8, 1964) was a Filipino Olympic boxer and actor. Padilla was also a film director, with his first film being Susi ng Kalangitan which was made in 1937.

== Personal life ==
From a famous family of actors and politicians, he is the brother of actor José Padilla Jr. and actor-director-politician Roy Padilla Sr., father to international boxing referee Carlos "Sonny" Dolorico Padilla Jr., grandfather to entertainment industry's Divine Diva Zsa Zsa Padilla, and great-grandfather to Philippine singer Karylle and Zia. He ran for senator in the 1946 Philippine Senate election under the Partido Modernista tandem of Hilario Moncado and Lou Salvador, but lost, placing 33rd out of the 57 senatorial candidates.
