= Togo (comedian) =

Filipino actor, comedian and vaudevillian

- Born: Andres L. Solomon; November 30, 1905
- Died: November 3, 1952 (aged 46)
- Resting place: Manila North Cemetery, Manila, Philippines

Comedy career
- Years active: 1932–1952
- Medium: Actor, vaudeville, comedian

Andres L. Solomon (November 30, 1905 – November 3, 1952), better known by his stage name Togo, was a Filipino actor, comedian and vaudevillian, famous as one half of the comedy team Pugo and Togo during the 1930s to 1950s until his death, which he was being replaced by Bentot from 1952.

Solomon performed in movies such as Kambal Tuko, released in 1952, in which he portrayed Popoy, Death March (1946), and Arimunding-Munding (1938).

== Death ==
Solomon died of a heart attack on November 3, 1952, during the filming of Dalawang Sundalong Kanin, 27 days before his 47th birthday.

== Legacy ==
Following Togo's death, LVN Pictures produced a short film on the life and death of the comedian and showed it as an added featurette of the movie. Pugo and his fellow on screen comedian partner Togo were both posthumously featured on the YouTube channel Graveyard Pinoy TV, a Filipino inspired version of Graveyard Hollywood TV of California that was launched in 2020.

== In popular culture ==
- Portrayed by Leo Bruno in the 2024 television series Pulang Araw.
