= List of movies produced by Sampaguita Pictures =

This is the list of theatrical feature films founded in 1937 owned by Sampaguita Pictures. It is also include some movies produced by their co-film companies like Vera-Perez Productions, VP Pictures or its combination of the two film company.

== 1930s ==
=== 1937 ===
1937
#	Title	Cast(s)	Genre	Director	Date released	Theater
1	Bituing Marikit	Elsa Oria, Rogelio dela Rosa, Ely Ramos, Sylvia Rosales, Teddy Benavidez, Nati Rubi, Billy Vizcarra	Musical	Carlos Vander Tolosa	December 12–20, 1937	Savoy Theater

=== 1938 ===
1938
#	Title	Cast(s)	Genre	Director	Date released	Theater
	Paroparong Bukid	Elsa Oria, Rudy Concepcion, Teddy Benavidez, Nati Rubi, Soledad Aquino, Jose Gonzales	Drama	Octavio Silos	May 31 – June 12, 1938	Grand Theater
	Madaling Araw	Elsa Oria, Ely Ramos, Yolanda Marquez, Teddy Benavidez, Ernesto la Guardia, Precioso Palma, Manuel Eloriaga, Nati Rubi, Billy Vizcarra, Exequiel Segovia, Joaquin Gavino	Musical	Carlos Vander Tolosa	October 11–25, 1938	Metropolitan Theater
	Dahong Lagas	Yolanda Marquez, Ely Ramos, Andres Centenera, Naty Rubi, Miguel Anzures, Soledad Aquino, Precioso Palma, Billy Vizcarra, Lita Zabala	Musical	Carlos Vander Tolosa	December 30, 1938 – January 6, 1939	Grand Theater

=== 1939 ===
1939
#	Title	Cast(s)	Genre	Director	Date released	Theater
	Lagot na Kuwintas	Rosario Moreno, Rogelio dela Rosa, Sylvia Rosales, Ernesto La Guardia, Miguel Anzures, Soledad Aquino, Nati Rubi, Precioso Palma, Billy Vizcarra, Joaquin Gavino, Patring Gomez	Drama	Carlos Padilla, Sr.	February 24, 1939	
	Pasang Krus	Corazon Noble, Rogelio dela Rosa, Rosa Aguirre, Naty Rubi, Justina David, Billy Vizcarra, Carmen Martinez, Salvador Tinsay, Francisco Monroy	Drama	Octavio Silos	May 30 – June 12, 1939	Grand Theater
	Ang Magsasampaguita	Corazon Noble, Rogelio dela Rosa, Tita Duran, Narding Anzures, Lota Delgado, Bert Le Roy, Miguel Anzures, Rosa Aguirre, Precioso Palma, Carmen Martinez, Jose Luna, Juanita Angeles, Jerry Brandy, Dina Valle	Drama	Gregorio Hernandez	November 22–29, 1939	Grand Theater
	Takip-Silim	Carmen Rosales, Rogelio de la Rosa, Rosa Aguirre, Lota Delgado, Gregorio Fernandez, Precioso Palma, Miguel Anzures, Jose Luna	Drama	Don Danon	December 28, 1939 – January 5, 1940	Grand Theater

== 1940s ==
=== 1940 ===
1940
#	Title	Cast(s)	Genre	Director	Date released	Theater
	Magbalik Ka, Hirang	Corazon Noble, Octavio Romero, Bert Le Roy, Rosa Aguirre, Jaime Castellvi, Gloria del Mundo, Justina David	Drama	Lorenzo Perez Tuells	March 14–18, 1940	Grand Theater
	Lambingan	Carmen Rosales, Rogelio dela Rosa, Precioso Palma, Bert LeRoy, Juanita Angeles, Rosa Aguirre, Jaime Castellvi	Romance	Lorenzo Perez Tuells	July 7–16, 1940	Grand Theater
	Nang Mahawi ang Ulap	Rogelio de la Rosa, Lota Delgado, Bert LeRoy, Precioso Palma, Rita Rica, Tita Duran, Rosa Aguirre, Africa de la Rosa, Nardo Vercudia, Engracio Ibarra, Patring Gomez, Horacio Morelos	Drama	Lorenzo Perez Tuells	November 28 – December 4, 1940	Grand Theater

=== 1941 ===
1941
#	Title	Cast(s)	Genre	Director	Date released	Theater
	Carmen	Carmen Rosales (Carmen), Jose Padilla, Jr., Pacita del Rio, Gregorio Fernandez, Precioso Palma, Justina David, Engracio Ibarra, Domingo Santos, Tomasa Alvarez, Rosario Lam	Drama	Gregorio Hernandez	January 31 – February 12, 1941	Dalisay Theater
	Panibugho	Corazon Noble, Jose Padilla, Jr., Pacita del Rio, Precioso Palma, Rita Rica, Patring Carvajal, Jose Cris Soto, Amelita Sol, Vitang Escobar	Drama	Lorenzo Perez Tuells	April 11–17, 1941	Dalisay Theater
	Princesita	Carmen Rosales, Jose Padilla, Jr., Roberto Rosales, Pacita del Rio, Gregorio Fernandez, Precioso Palma, Engracio Ibarra, Rosario Lam, Linda Estrella, Luis Pedrino, Vita Ortega, Nardo Vercudia, Lina Rosales	Drama	Gregorio Hernandez	May 9–17, 1941	Dalisay Theater
	Tampuhan	Carmen Rosales, Rogelio dela Rosa, Pacita del Rio, Teddy Benavidez, Precioso Palma, Rosa Aguirre, Engracio Ibarra, Amelita Sol, Paco Zamora	Drama	Lorenzo Perez Tuells	September 19 – October 1, 1941	Dalisay Theater

=== 1942 ===
1942
#	Title	Cast(s)	Genre	Director	Date released	Theater
	Landas na Ginto	Jose Padilla, Jr., Corazon Noble	Drama		December 26, 1942 – January 9, 1943	Dalisay Theater

=== 1946 ===
1946
#	Title	Cast(s)	Genre	Director	Date released	Theater
	Ulilang Watawat	Elsa Oria, Jose Padilla, Jr., Maria Cristina, Raul Villeza, Pedro Faustino, Engracio Ibarra, Guilliermo Carls	Drama, Romance	Octavio Silos	May 31 – June 11, 1946	Dalisay Theater
	So Long, America (I'll Be Seeing You, Everywhere)	Fely Vallejo, Angel Esmeralda, Johnnie Arville, Fred Montilla	Drama, Romance	Gerardo de Leon	July 29 – August 12, 1946	Dalisay Theater
	Guerilya	Carmen Rosales, Tita Duran, Celso Baltazar, Oscar Moreno, Maria Cristina	Action	Octavio Silos	October 13–24, 1946	Dalisay Theater, Illusion Theater
	Maynila	Corazon Noble, Ely Ramos, Tita Duran, Fred Montilla, Johnnie Arville, Cris de Vera, Maria Cristina	Romance, Drama	Lorenzo Perez Tuells	December 14–26, 1946	Dalisay Theater

=== 1947 ===
1947
#	Title	Cast(s)	Genre	Director	Date released	Theater
	Kaaway ng Bayan	Carmen Rosales, Leopoldo Salcedo, Roberto Rosales, Luis Vizconde, Vicente Ocampo, Chipopoy, Cesar Gallardo, Totoy Torrente, Rogelio Nite, Pat Salvador	Drama, Romance	Paquito Bolero	January 14–31, 1947	Dalisay Theater

=== 1948 ===
1948
#	Title	Cast(s)	Genre	Director	Date released	Theater
	Dalawang Dambana	Fred Montilla, Linda Estrella, Pacita del Rio, Roberto Rosales, Fernando Royo	Romance	Paquito Bolero	January 16–27, 1948	Center Theater
	Amapola	Paraluman, Oscar Moreno, Lillian Leonardo, Guia Imperial, Vicente Liwanag, Ernesto Garcia, Paco Zamora, Maria Ballesteros, Candida Valderama, Marcela Garcia, Socorro Cruz, Aruray	Romance	Tor Villano	January 28 – February 11, 1948	Center Theater
	Pamana ng Tulisan	Tita Duran, Fred Montilla, Maria Cristina, Rose Lorenzana, Teresita Martinez, Pedro Faustino, Rafael Jimenez, Raul Tito Villeza, Africa de la Rosa, Miguel Lopez, Mariano Nuke	Drama	Octavio Silos	February 24 – March 11, 1948	Center Theater
	Ang Selosa	Carmen Rosales (Selina), Ely Ramos, Lillian Leonardo, Roberto Rosales, Rosie Lorenzana, Vicente Liwanag, Oscar Frazenda, Arsenio Almonte, Ely Nakpil, Ramon Toledo Jr., Dick Tuazon, Liberty Ilagan	Romance, Drama	Eddie Romero	April 8, 1948	Center Theater
	Sor Remedios	Paraluman, Fred Montilla, Rosie Lorenzana, Maria Cristina	Romance, Drama	Octavio Silos	June 3–12, 1948	Dalisay Theater
	Maharlika	Tita Duran, Oscar Moreno, Pancho Magalona, Maria Cristina, Roberto Rosales, Vicente Liwanag, Guia Imperial, Teresita Martinez, Rosie Lorenzana, Manolo Vaca, Pedro Faustino, Bert Olivar, Rizalino Mendoza, Jose Luz Bernardo, Leonora Ruiz	Drama	Lorenzo Perez Tuells	July 2–12, 1948	Dalisay Theater
	Awit ng Bulag	Paraluman, Fred Montilla, Linda Estrella, Maria Cristina, Bert Olivar, Jose Luis Bernardo	Musical, Drama	Octavio Silos	September 1, 1948	Dalisay Theater

== 1950s ==
=== 1950 ===
1950
#	Title	Cast(s)	Genre	Director	Date released	Theater
1	Huwag Ka Nang Magtampo	Tita Duran, Pancho Magalona, Tessie Martinez, Tito Arevalo, Spanky Boy, Chichay, Tolindoy, Cesar Ramirez	Musical, Love story	Lorenzo Perez Tuells	January 7–15, 1950	Dalisay Theater
	Mapuputing Kamay	Pancho Magalona, Lillian Leonardo, Alicia Vergel, Tessie Martinez, Norma Vales	Action	Octavio Silos Dr. Fausto J. Galauran	April 16–25, 1950	Life Theater
	Huling Patak ng Dugo	Pancho Magalona, Alicia Vergel, Bert Olivar, Rosa Mia, Jaime Castellvi, Chichay, Tolindoy, Cesar Ramirez, Eddie Garcia	Action, Drama	Nardo Vercudia	August 4–13, 1950	Life Theater
	Kay Ganda Mo, Neneng	Tita Duran, Pancho Magalona, Tessie Martinez, Tolindoy, Aruray, Pedro Faustino, Jose Luz Bernardo, Bart del Rosario, Rebecca del Rio, Aring Bautista, Dolores Criscini, Mely Lim, Jose Salameda, Pablo Raymundo	Musical	Octavio Silos	December 22–31, 1950	Life Theater

=== 1951 ===
1951
#	Title	Cast(s)	Genre	Director	Date released	Theater
	Roberta	Tessie Agana, Van de Leon, Bella Flores, Maria Cristina, Rosa Mia, José de Villa, Aruray, Boy Alano, Tony Cayado	Drama	Olive La Torre	March 2–11, 1951	Life Theater
	Dugong Bughaw	Oscar Moreno, Alicia Vergel, Tessie Martinez, Norma Vales, Ernesto Garcia, Bert Olivar, Jose de Villa, Tony Suarez, Ricardo Mirasol, Ruben Arcangel, Totoy Torrente, Batotoy, Rebecca del Rio	Action, Fantasy	Nardo Vercudia	April 1–10, 1951	Life Theater
	Berdugo ng mga Anghel	Oscar Moreno, Alicia Vergel, Tessie Martinez	Horror	Octavio Silos	July 30, 1951	Life Theater
	Batas ng Daigdig	Fred Montilla, Linda Estrella, Tessie Agana, Rudy Francisco, Rosa Mia, Vic Andaya, Jose de Villa, Pedro Faustino, Bella Flores, Horacio Morelos, Sonia Reyes	Drama	Artemio Marquez	October 18, 1951	Life Theater

=== 1952 ===
1952
#	Title	Cast(s)	Genre	Director	Date released	Theater
	Barbaro	Pancho Magalona, Tita Duran, Tessie Martinez, Bert Olivar, Tony Cayado, Jose de Villa, Chichay, Pedro Faustino, Totoy Torrente, Martin Marfil, Olive La Torre	Action	Enrique Moreno (Eddie Romero)	January 25 – February 4, 1952	Life Theater
	Madam X	Alicia Vergel, Cesar Ramirez, Gloria Romero, Chichay, Tolindoy, Tony Cayado, Jose de Villa, Pedro Faustino, Aring Bautista, Precy Ortega	Drama	Artemio B. Tecson	February 10–19, 1952	Dalisay Theater
	Mayamang Balo	Fred Montilla, Linda Estrella, Tessie Martinez		Octavio Silos	March 18, 1952	
	Lihim ng Kumpisalan	Pancho Magalona, Linda Estrella, Rudy Francisco, Jose de Villa, Pedro Faustino, Tolindoy	Drama	Olive La Torre	March 21, 1952	
	Palasig	Cesar Ramirez, Gloria Romero, Aruray, Tony Cayado, Totoy Torrente, Pedro Faustino, Dolores Crescini		Artemio B. Tecson	April 15–24, 1952	Life Theater
	Kerubin	Tessie Agana (Kerubin), Linda Estrella (Anastacia), Van de Leon, Chichay (Panchang), Tolindoy (Atty. Justo), Bella Flores (Margarita), Jose de Villa, Rebecca Gonzales (Divinia)	Fantasy	Octavio Silos	April 30, 1952	Dalisay Theater
	Hiram na Mukha	Fred Montilla, Alicia Vergel, Bert Olivar, Pedro Faustino, Rebecca del Rio, Horacio Morelos, Eddie Garcia, Maria Ballesteros, Ruben Arcangel, Servando Javier, Eddie Jarana, Alex Angeles, Ric Alvarez, Tommy Perez, Armando Caballero	Drama	Nardo Vercudia	May 25 – June 3, 1952	Life Theater
	Basahang Ginto	Pancho Magalona (Danny), Alicia Vergel (Orang), (Note: Alicia Vergel won her first FAMAS Award as the Best Actress in 1952.) Myrna Delgado (Sylvia), Aruray, Tony Cayado, Jose de Villa, Aring Bautista, Horacio Morelos, Maria Ballesteros, Dolores Crescini, Dely Magpayo (Doña Marina), Jose Salameda, Eddie Garcia, Herminia Caranea	Drama	Mar S. Torres	August 13–22, 1952	Life Theater
	Ulila ng Bataan	Tessie Agana, Mona Lisa, Sylvia La Torre, Boy Alano, Ramon Revilla, Precy Ortega, Totoy Torrente, Martin Marfil, Jose de Villa, Ven Medina, Olive La Torre, Batotoy, Aring Bautista, Horacio Morelos, Jose Salameda, Ric Flores	Action, Drama	Armando Garces	September 22 – October 1, 1952	Life Theater

=== 1953 ===
1953
#	Title	Cast(s)	Genre	Director	Date released	Theater
	Sa isang Sulyap Mo, Tita	Tita Duran, Pancho Magalona, Dolphy, Aruray, Tony Cayado, Jose de Villa, Aring Bautista, Consuelo P. Osorio, Bert Guinto, Eddie Garcia, Bert Olivar, Ricardo Mirasol, Artemio Tecson	Romance	Armando Garces	August 8–17, 1953	Life Theater
	Mister Kasintahan	Gloria Romero, Ramon Revilla, Chichay, Tolindoy, Rebecca del Rio, Precy Ortega	Romance	Nardo Vercudia	September 17–26, 1953	Life Theater
	Maldita	Pancho Magalona, Rita Gomez, Boy Alano, Tony Cayado, Bella Flores, Aruray, Martin Marfil, Aring Bautista, Panchito Alba, Ching Tello, Eddie Garcia, Jose Salameda, Citas Avellana, Dolphy, Horacio Morelos, Conrado Conde	Comedy	Eddie Romero	October 2–11, 1953	Dalisay Theater
	Inspirasiyon	Carmen Rosales, Norma Vales, Van de Leon, Katy de la Cruz, Rosa Mia, Pedro Faustino, Jose de Villa, Rebecca del Rio, Panchito Alba, Aring Bautista, Horacio Morelos, Pablo Raymundo, Ric Rodrigo	Romance, Drama	Armando Garces	October 27 – November 5, 1953	Life Theater
	Kiko	Boy Alano, Patria Plata, Van de Leon, Rosa Mia, Aruray, Etang Discher, Leonora Ruiz	Drama	Oliva La Torre	November 11–20, 1953	Dalisay Theater
	Vod–a–Vil	Tita Duran, Pancho Magalona, Katy de la Cruz, Rosa Mia, Dolphy, Rebecca del Rio, Pedro Faustino, Jose de Villa, Bert Olivar, Priscilla Concepcion, Horacio Morelos, Armando Villamor, Pablo Raymundo, Bayani	Musical	Oliva La Torre	December 21–30, 1953	Dalisay Theater

=== 1954 ===
1954
#	Title	Cast(s)	Genre	Director	Date released	Theater
	Maalaala Mo Kaya?	Carmen Rosales (Pilar), Rogelio de la Rosa (Celso), Patria Plata (Patria del Mar), Precy Ortega (Precy), Rosa Mia, Dolphy (Menes), Tony Cayado, Jose de Villa, Horacio Morelos, Helen Gamboa, Aruray, Rosa Mia, Marcela Garcia, Jose Salameda, Leleng Isla, Herminia Carranza	Musical, Drama	Mar S. Torres	January 22–31, 1954	Center Theater
	Musikong Mumbong	Pancho Magalona, Gloria Romero, Boy Alano, Rosa Mia, Rebecca del Rio, Etang Discher, Horacio Morelos	Romance, Musical	Octavio Silos	February 3–12, 1954	Center Theater
	Tres Muskiteras	Cesar Ramirez, Myrna Delgado, Norma Vales, Ric Rodrigo, Aruray, Bayani, Precy Ortega	Romance, Fantasy	Nardo Vercudia	February 9–18, 1954	Dalisay Theater
	Pilya	Gloria Romero, Ric Rodrigo, Lolita Rodriguez, Roberto Gonzales, Rebecca del Rio, Jose de Villa, Horacio Morelos, Justina David, Conchita Carreon, Tony Cayado, Pepito Vera Perez	Romance, Comedy	Tony Cayado	March 21–30, 1954	Dalisay Theater
	Matandang Dalaga	Carmen Rosales, Jose Padilla, Jr., Ramon Revilla, Myrna Delgado, Aruray, Precy Ortega, Conrado Conde, Etang Discher, Horacio Morelos, Pablo Raymundo, Rosa Mia, Tony Cayado	Romance	Olive La Torre	April 21–30, 1954	Center Theater
	Milyonarya at Hampas-Lupa	Pancho Magalona, Linda Estrella, Rita Gomez, Rosa Mia, Rebecca del Rio, Tony Cayado, Eddie Garcia, Imelda Concepcion, Rudy Francisco	Drama, Romance	Nardo Vercudia	April 30 – May 9, 1954	Dalisay Theater
	Ukala (Ang Walang Suko)	Cesar Ramirez (Ukala), Alicia Vergel (Margarita), Chichay (Gracita), Tolindoy (Tarko), Bert Olivar (Don Sisenando Labrador), Eddie Garcia (Chief Ungka), Martin Marfil (Pietro Bascones), Conrado Conde, Jaime Javier, Teroy de Guzman, Panchito Alba, Pablo Raymundo, Mila Oswald, Herminia Carranza, Joe Sison, Apolonia Aguilar, Corazon Rivas (young Margarita), Nonny Padilla (young Ukala), Sonny Padilla (young Tarno)	Action, Western	Octavio Silos	May 22–31, 1954	Center Theater
	Anak ng Espada	Tessie Agana, Norma Vales, Rita Gomez, Ric Rodrigo, Van de Leon, Boy Alano, Aruray, Rebecca del Rio, Dalisay Moreno, Jose de Villa, Panchito Alba, Eddie Garcia	Fantasy, Action	Tony Cayado	June 9–18, 1954	Dalisay Theater
	Dalagang Ilocana	Gloria Romero, Ric Rodrigo, Rudy Francisco, Dolphy, Rebecca del Rio, Eddie Garcia, Marcela Garcia, Horacio Morelos	Comedy	Olive La Torre	July 4–13, 1954	Life Theater
	Sa Isang Halik Mo, Pancho	Tita Duran, Pancho Magalona, Dolphy, Bayani Casimiro, Carding Cruz	Romance, Comedy	Armando Garces	July 13–22, 1954	Center Theater
	Nagkita si Kerubin at si Tulisang Pugot	Fred Montilla, Linda Estrella, Tessie Agana, Norma Vales, Rudy Francisco, Chichay, Tolindoy, Luis Gonzales, Imelda Concepcion	Fantasy	Octavio Silos	July 19–28, 1954	Dalisay Theater
	Sabungera	Ric Rodrigo, Lolita Rodriguez, Dolphy, Boy Alano, Rosa Mia, Rebecca del Rio, Horacio Morelos	Romance, Comedy	Tony Cayado	August 8, 1954	
	MN	Carmen Rosales, Alicia Vergel, Oscar Ramirez, Cesar Ramirez	Drama, Romance	Mar S. Torres	August 13, 1954	
	Anak sa Panalangin	Gloria Romero, Ramon Revilla, Chichay, Tolindoy, Rosa Mia, Panchito Alba, Eddie Garcia	Drama	Octavio Silos	September 22 – October 1, 1954	Life Theater
	Menor de Edad	Pancho Magalona, Myrna Delgado, Dolphy, Rosa Mia, Horacio Morelos, Dalisay Moreno, Imelda Concepcion, Ben Johnson, Herminia Carranza	Comedy	Mar S. Torres	October 7–16, 1954	Dalisay Theater
	Bondying	Fred Montilla, Lolita Rodriguez, Chichay, Tolindoy, Gregorio Ticman, Rebecca del Rio, Eddie Garcia, Jose de Villa, Leonora Ruiz, Teroy de Guzman, Bert Olivar	Comedy	Armando Garces	October 22–31, 1954	Life Theater
	Aristokrata	Rogelio de la Rosa, Alicia Vergel, Aruray, Panchito Alba, Eddie Garcia, Etang Discher, Bert Olivar	Action, Drama	Olive La Torre	November 1–10, 1954	Life Theater
	Tres Ojos	Cesar Ramirez, Nena Cardenas, Myrna Delgado, Van de Leon, Rosa Mia, Jose de Villa, Etang Discher, Martin Marfil, Manolo Noble, Tony Dungan, Leleng Isla, Pepito Vera Perez, Apolonia Aguilar, Waldo Orendain	Action	Octavio Silos	November 16–25, 1954	Dalisay Theater
	Dumagit	Cesar Ramirez, Myrna Delgado, Lolita Rodriguez, Van de Leon, Aruray, Jose de Villa, Martin Marfil, Bella Flores	Action	Armando Garces	December 11–20, 1954	Life Theater
	Kurdapya	Gloria Romero, Ramon Revilla, Ric Rodrigo, Dolphy, Aruray, Eddie Garcia, Rebecca del Rio, Etang Discher, Herminia Carranza	Romance, Musical	Tony Cayado	December 31, 1954 – January 9, 1955	Life Theater

=== 1955 ===
1955
#	Title	Cast(s)	Genre	Director	Date released	Theater
	Ang Tangi Kong Pag-ibig	Carmen Rosales, Rogelio de la Rosa, Norma Vales, Luis Gonzales, Rosa Mia, Horacio Morelos, Bert Olivar, Pablo Raymundo	Romance, Drama	Mar S. Torres	January 20–29, 1955	Life Theater
	Tatay na si Bondying	Fred Montilla, Myrna Delgado, Norma Vales, Dolphy, Chichay, Tolindoy, Gregorio Ticman, Eddie Garcia, Jose de Villa, Leonara Ruiz, Teroy de Guzman, Carding Cruz	Comedy	Armando Garces	February 9–18, 1955	Life Theater
	Uhaw na Pag-ibig	Carmen Rosales, Cesar Ramirez, Chichay, Tolindoy, Etang Discher, Precy Ortega, Manolo Noble, Horacio Morelos, Tony Dungan, Teroy de Guzman, Elena Adorable	Romance, Drama	Olive La Torre	April 10–19, 1955	Life Theater
	Sa Dulo ng Landas	Pancho Magalona (Ernesto), Ramon Revilla (Fermin), Myrna Delgado (Clara), Lolita Rodriguez (Mercedes), Panchito Alba, Marcela Garcia, Horacio Morelos, Herminia Carranza, Apolonia Aguilar, Elena Adorable, Clara Yumul	Romance, Drama	Armando Garces	April 25 – May 4, 1955	Dalisay Theater
	Mariposa	Gloria Romero, Ric Rodrigo, Norma Vales, Rudy Francisco, Rosa Mia, Aruray, Bella Flores, Rebecca del Rio, Herminia Carranza, Jose de Villa, Etang Discher, Panchito Alba	Romance, Comedy	Mar S. Torres	May 20–29, 1955	Life Theater
	Balisong	Alicia Vergel, Ramon Revilla, Van de Leon, Dolphy, Manolo Noble, Maria Cristina, Jose de Villa, Panchito Alba, Bert Olivar, Martin Marfil, Pablo Raymundo, Totoy Torrente	Romance, Suspense	Conrado Conde	June 4–13, 1955	Dalisay Theater
	Despatsadora	Gloria Romero, Luis Gonzales, Dolphy, Rosa Mia, Aruray, Bella Flores, Eddie Garcia, Panchito Alba, Etang Discher	Romance	Tony Cayado	July 9–18, 1955	Life Theater
	R.O.T.C.	Carmen Rosales (Conchita), Oscar Moreno (Ernesto), Ric Rodrigo (Ruben), Myrna Delgado (Ruben)	Comedy, Drama	Octavio Silos	July 14–23, 1955	Dalisay Theater
	Rosana	Ric Rodrigo, Lolita Rodriguez (Rosana), Norma Vales, Daisy Romualdez	Drama	Armando Garces	August 8–17, 1955	Life Theater
	Waldas	Pancho Magalona (Alex), Myrna Delgado (Elizabeth Sandoval), Van de Leon (Don Ruperto), Rosa Mia (Doña Jovita), Chichay (Lulay), Eddie Garcia (Ben), Panchito Alba (Ponggoy), Rod Navarro (Roque), Martin Marfil, Jose Salameda, Teroy de Guzman, Elena Adorable	Romance	Mar S. Torres	August 23 – September 1, 1955	Dalisay Theater
	Iyung-Iyo	Carmen Rosales, Rogelio de la Rosa, Bella Flores, Eddie Garcia, Imelda Concepcion, Manolo Noble, Eddie Arenas	Romance, Drama	Jose de Villa	September 17–26, 1955	Life Theater
	Binibining Kalog	Ramon Revilla, Lolita Rodriguez, Rudy Francisco, Rosa Mia, Tolindoy, Manolo Noble, Rod Navarro, Zeny Zabala, Ben Johnson, Precy Ortega, Nelly Baylon	Comedy	Octavio Silos	October 2–11, 1955	Dalisay Theater
	Hindi Basta-Basta	Gloria Romero, Ric Rodrigo, Dolphy, Daisy Romualdez, Eddie Arenas	Romance, Comedy	Luciano B. Carlos	October 27 – November 5, 1955	Life Theater
	Lupang Kayumanggi	Alicia Vergel, Cesar Ramirez, Van de Leon, Norma Vales, Tito Garcia, Panchito Alba, Daisy Romualdez, Eddie Garcia, Martin Marfil, Aring Bautista, Marcela Garcia, Totoy Torrente, Apolonia Aguilar, Venchito Galvez	Action, Drama	Armando Garces	November 11–20, 1955	Dalisay Theater
	Hootsy Kootsy	Gloria Romero, Luis Gonzales, Dolphy, Zeny Zabala, Horacio Morelos, Herminia Carranza	Romance, Action, Comedy	Mar S. Torres	November 16–25, 1955	Life Theater
	Mambo-Dyambo	Fred Montilla, Alicia Vergel, Dolphy, Bella Flores, Eddie Garcia, Aring Bautista, Tony Dungan, Jaime Javier, Cora Maceda	Fantasy, Comedy	Octavio Silos	December 6–15, 1955	Life Theater

=== 1956 ===
1956
#	Title	Cast(s)	Genre	Director	Date released	Theater
	Society Girl	Rita Gomez, Luis Gonzales, Rosa Mia, Aruray, Nelly Baylon, Panchito Alba, Tito Galla	Drama	Tony Cayado	January 20–29, 1956	Dalisay Theater
	Lydia	Carmen Rosales, Rogelio dela Rosa, Paraluman, Precy Ortega, Boy Planas, Jose de Villa, Marcela Garcia, Apolonia Aguilar, Venchito Galvez, M. Ballesteros, Santiago Duenas, Lydia Correa, Amalia Fuentes, Juancho Gutierrez	Family drama	Armando Garces	February 4–13, 1956	Life Theater
	Chabacano	Myrna Delgado, Luis Gonzales, Dolphy, Daisy Romualdez, Chichay, Zeny Zabala, Rod Navarro, Precy Ortega, Herminia Carranza, Horacio Morelos, Justina David, Manolo Noble, Patty Maceda, Apolonia Aguilar, Barbara Perez	Romance	Octavio Silos	February 14–23, 1956	Life Theater
	Senyorita de Kampanilya	Rita Gomez, Ric Rodrigo, Eddie Arenas, Barbara Perez, Tito Garcia, Horacio Morelos, Herminia Carranza, Ben Johnson, Manolo Noble, Aring Bautista	Romance	Jose de Villa	February 29 – March 9, 1956	Dalisay Theater
	Vacacionista	Gloria Romero, Luis Gonzales, Dolphy, Norma Vales, Daisy Romualdez	Romance	Mar S. Torres	March 15–24, 1956	Life Theater
	Babalu	Daisy Romualdez (Babalu), Paraluman, Oscar Moreno, Ramon Revilla, Van de Leon	Comedy	Octavio Silos	March 27 – April 3, 1956	Life Theater
	Via Dolorosa	Fred Montilla (Dante), Rita Gomez (Dolores), Aruray (Aling Magna), Bella Flores (Bella), Etang Discher, Rod Navarro (Gerry)	Drama	Conrado Conde	April 9–18, 1956	Dalisay Theater
	Kontra Partido	Rita Gomez, Eddie Arenas, Tolindoy, Pablo Guevarra, Nori Dalisay, Lydia Correz, Carmelita Isidro, Rod Navarro, Aruray, Boy Planas, Nelly Baylon, Leleng Isla, Priscilla Concepcion, Pacita Arana	Comedy	Octavio Silos	May 19–28, 1956	Dalisay Theater
	Tumbando Caña	Lolita Rodriguez (Patricia), Luis Gonzales (Ram), Norma Vales (Desta), Rosa Mia, Bella Flores, Aruray, Panchito Alba, Etang Discher, Aring Bautista, Horacio Morelos, Herminia Carranza, Venchito Galvez, Leleng Isla, Marcela Garcia, Cora Maceda, Apolonia Aguilar, Lydia Correa	Comedy, Action	Olive La Torre	June 3–12, 1956	Life Theater
	Gilda	Lolita Rodriguez (Gilda), Eddie Arenas (Ricardo Santos), Rosa Mia (Aling Anday), Maria Cristina, Eddie Garcia (Candido), Zeny Zabala, Pablo Guevarra, Leleng Isla, Aring Bautista, Marcela Garcia	Drama	Armando Garces	July 13–22, 1956	Life Theater
	Rodora	Amalia Fuentes (Rodora), Paraluman (Clara), Van de Leon (Don Gustavo), Juancho Gutierrez (Celso), Cesar Reyes, Chichay, Justina David, Ven Medina (Damian), Martin Marfil (Mang Adiong), Romeo Vasquez, Meldy Corrales	Drama	Mar S. Torres	August 17–26, 1956	Dalisay Theater
	Pampanggenya	Rogelio de la Rosa, Linda Estrella, Rudy Francisco, Barbara Perez, Panchito Alba, Nori Dalisay, Justina David, Ben Johnson, Vic Guevarra, Marcela Garcia, Apolonia Aguilar	Comedy, Drama	Jose de Villa	August 22–31, 1956	Life Theater
	Katawang-Lupa	Leopoldo Salcedo, Ramon Revilla, Lolita Rodriguez, Daisy Romualdez, Patria Plata	Romance, Drama	Conrado Conde	September 16–25, 1956	Dalisay Theater

=== 1957 ===
1957
#	Title	Cast(s)	Genre	Director	Date released	Theater
	Hong Kong Holiday	Gloria Romero, Ric Rodrigo, Paraluman, Dolphy, Daisy Romualdez, Tony Cayado, Aring Bautista, Liza Ferrer	Romance	Mar S. Torres	January 28 – February 17, 1957	Life Theater
	Tarhata	Fred Montilla, Ramon Revilla, Van de Leon, Barbara Perez, Lolita Rodriguez, Eddie Garcia, Martin Marfil, Jaime Javier, Leleng Isla, Vic Guevarra, Pepe Salameda, Pablo Raymundo, Cora Maceda, Cesar Reyes, Pablo Guevarra	Action	Armando Garces	February 23 – March 4, 1957	Dalisay Theater
	Bituing Marikit	Dolphy, Amalia Fuentes, Juancho Gutierrez, Daisy Romualdez	Romance, Musical	Carlos Vander Tolosa	March 20–29, 1957	Life Theater
	Isang Milyong Kasalanan	Rita Gomez, Luis Gonzales, Barbara Perez	Drama	Carlos Vander Tolosa	April 14–23, 1957	Life Theater
	Veronica	Rogelio de la Rosa, Paraluman, Lolita Rodriguez, Panchito Alba, Tolindoy, Aring Bautista, Ven Medina, Venchito Galvez, Priscilla Valdez, Pablo Raymundo, Lydia Correa, Nenita Navarro, Apolonia Aguilar, Aida Villegas	Romance, Drama	Mar S. Torres	May 29 – June 7, 1957	Life Theater
	Batang Bangkusay	Fred Montilla (Nestor), Rita Gomez (Conchita), Van de Leon (Enteng), Nelly Baylon, Boy Alano, Manolo Noble, Horacio Morelos, Pablo Guevarra, Aring Bautista, Jaime Javier, Matimtiman Cruz	Action	Conrado Conde	August 27 – September 5, 1957	Life Theater
	Prinsesa Gusgusin	Susan Roces, Romeo Vasquez, Tito Galla, Nelly Baylon, Bella Flores, Zeny Zabala, Rod Navarro, Etang Discher, Nancy Carlos, Aring Bautista, Georgie Quizon, Bert Olivar, Jose de Villa	Romance	Carlos Vander Tolosa	October 21–30, 1957	
	Taga sa Bato	Paraluman (Amanda), Lolita Rodriguez (Lumen), Luis Gonzales (Braulio), Van de Leon (Don Claudio), Eddie Garcia (Arnulfo)	Action, Drama	Conrado Conde	December 15–24, 1957	
	Paru-Parong Bukid	Gloria Romero, Luis Gonzales, Dolphy, Daisy Romualdez, Eddie Garcia, Etang Discher, Boy Planas, Venchito Galvez, Ely Roque, Luis Castro, Jaime Javier, Vic Guevarra, Lilibeth Perez	Musical, Romance	Armando Garces	December 15, 1957 –January 3, 1958	

=== 1958 ===
1958
#	Title	Cast(s)	Genre	Director	Date released	Theater
	Beloved	Gloria Romero, Ric Rodrigo, Tito Galla	Romance, Love story	Tony Cayado	March 25 – April 3, 1958	Life Theater
	Anino ni Bathala	Paraluman (Dolores), Ric Rodrigo (Ruding), Marlene Dauden (Sylvia), Eddie Garcia (Edgar)	Drama	Conrado Conde	April 19–28, 1958	Dalisay Theater
	Tatlong Ilaw sa Dambana (Kalbaryo ng isang Ina)	Rita Gomez, Barbara Perez, Daisy Romualdez, Rosa Mia, Greg Martin, Rod Navarro, Luis Gonzales	Drama	Jose de Villa	May 29 – June 7, 1958	Dalisay Theater
	Silveria (Ang Kabayong Daldalera)	Dolphy, Daisy Romualdez, Marlene Dauden, Tony Marzan, Eddie Garcia, Panchito Alba, Silveria, Alexander, Gigolo	Comedy	Octavio Silos	June 13–22, 1958	Life Theater
	Madaling Araw	Amalia Fuentes, Juancho Gutierrez, Susan Roces, Romeo Vasquez, Rosa Mia, Tito Galla, Carlos Salazar	Musical	Armando Garces	July 3–12, 1958	Life Theater
	Mapait na Lihim	Ric Rodrigo, Lolita Rodriguez, Van de Leon, Marlene Dauden, Etang Discher	Drama	Octavio Silos	July 8–17, 1958	Dalisay Theater
	Baby Bubut	Amalia Fuentes, Juancho Gutierrez, Tito Galla, Rod Navarro, Meldy Corrales, Etang Discher	Comedy	Rosa Mia	July 23 – August 1, 1958	Life Theater
	Ulilang Anghel	Rosemarie, Paraluman, Amalia Fuentes, Susan Roces, Barbara Perez, Daisy Romualdez, Tony Marzan, Tito Galla, Greg Martin, Jose Mari, Tony Cayado, Eddie Garcia, Etang Discher, Delia Marcos, Boy Planas, Rosa Mia	Drama	Jose de Villa	September 22 – October 1, 1958	Life Theater
	Tatang Edyer	Paraluman, Dolphy, Eddie Arenas, Daisy Romualdez, Herminia Carranza, Darling Twins, Marcela Garcia, Santiago Duenas, Jose Salameda, Sabas San Juan	Musical	Tony Cayado	September 26 – October 5, 1958	Dalisay Theater
	Talipandas	Rita Gomez (Esperanza), Luis Gonzales (Bien), Van de Leon (Raul), Carlos Salazar (Andy), Bella Flores (Teta), Zeny Zabala (Estela), Pacita Arana, Ely Roque	Drama	Conrado Conde	October 17–26, 1958	Dalisay Theater
	Lover Boy	Susan Roces, Romeo Vasquez, Jose Mari, Liberty Ilagan, The Wing Duo, Rod Navarro, Pacita Arana, Boy Planas, Etang Discher, Venchito Galvez, Isa Rinio	Romance, Love story	Carlos Vander Tolosa	November 26 – December 3, 1958	Dalisay Theater

=== 1959 ===
1959
#	Title	Cast(s)	Genre	Director	Date released	Theater
	Sandra	Carmen Rosales (Sandra), Leopoldo Salcedo (Carding), Tony Marzan, Rosa Mia, Pablo Guevarra, Jaime Javier, Marcela Garcia, Ricardo Mirasol, Cora Maceda, Pablo Raymundo	Drama, Romance	Jose de Villa	January 5–14, 1959	Dalisay Theater
	Ikaw ang aking Buhay	Gloria Romero (Conchita), Luis Gonzales (Mario / Manuel), Rosa Mia, Greg Martin, Delia Marcos (Angelina), Zeny Zabala (Doña Marina), Venchito Galvez	Drama, Romance	Mar S. Torres	January 20–29, 1959	Life Theater
	Alipin ng Palad	Lolita Rodriguez, Luis Gonzales, Eddie Garcia, Tony Cayado, Bella Flores, Zeny Zabala, Priscilla Valdez, Cesar Reyes, Leleng Isla, Naty Mallares, Aring Bautista, Lydia Correa, Marcela Garcia	Drama	Octavio Silos	February 4–13, 1959	Dalisay Theater
	Handsome	Susan Roces, Jose Mari	Romance	Carlos Vander Tolosa	March 6–15, 1959	Dalisay Theater
	Pitong Pagsisisi	Carmen Rosales, Gloria Romero, Paraluman, Rita Gomez, Ric Rodrigo, Lolita Rodriguez, Luis Gonzales, Van de Leon, Amalia Fuentes, Juancho Gutierrez, Susan Roces, Romeo Vasquez, Barbara Perez, Marlene Dauden, Carlos Salazar, Tony Marzan, Tony Cayado, Eddie Garcia, Liberty Ilagan, Eddie Gutierrez, Ven Medina, Leleng Isla, Venchito Galvez	Drama	Armando Garces	March 21–30, 1959	
	Pakiusap	Dolphy, Amalia Fuentes, Juancho Gutierrez, Daisy Romualdez, Panchito Alba, Priscilla Valdez, Boy Planas, Horacio Morelos, Cesar Reyes, Isa Rinio, Aring Bautista, Santiago Buenas	Musical	Conrado Conde	March 28 – April 3, 1959	Grand Theater
	Tanikalang Apoy	Paraluman (Rebecca), Rita Gomez (Roda), Lolita Rodriguez (Ester), Eddie Arenas, Carlos Salazar, Eddie Garcia (Rodrigo), Etang Discher (Doña Roberta), Van de Leon (Rodel), Matimtiman Cruz, Bella Flores	Action, Drama	Jose de Villa	April 10–19, 1959	
	Kalabog en Bosyo	Dolphy, Panchito, Eddie Arenas, Barbara Perez, Tito Galla, Greg Martin, Meldy Corrales, Liberty Ilagan, Priscilla Valdez, Eddie Gutierrez, Horacio Morelos, Charlie Davao	Comedy	Tony Cayado	April 15–24, 1959	Dalisay Theater
	Batas ng Alipin	Ric Rodrigo, Lolita Rodriguez, Tito Galla, Liberty Ilagan, Pablo Guevarra, Isa Rinio, Matimtiman Cruz, Priscilla Valdez, Eddie Gutierrez, Boy Alano, Aring Bautista	Drama	Octavio Silos	May 25 – June 3, 1959	Dalisay Theater
	Cicatriz	Lolita Rodriguez (Aida Alegre), Luis Gonzales (Willie Miranda), Barbara Perez (Minda), Carlos Salazar, Greg Martin, Rosita Noble, Bella Flores, Zeny Zabala, Venchito Galvez, Ven Medina	Drama	Tony Cayado	June 9–18, 1959	
	Debutante	Susan Roces (Cely), Oscar Moreno (Manding), Carmen Rosales (Doña Loreta), Eddie Arenas (Don Menandro), Romeo Vasquez, Daisy Romualdez, Rod Navarro, Marcela Garcia, Aring Bautista	Drama	Jose de Villa	July 19–28, 1959	
	Baby Boy	Jose Mari (Ronnie), Carmen Rosales (Nilda), Paraluman, Amalia Fuentes, Ven Medina, Meldy Corrales, Nori Dalisay, Lito Legaspi, Boy Alano, Justina David, Ely Roque, Herminia Carranza	Romance, Family drama	Carlos Vander Tolosa	August 8–17, 1959	Life Theater
	Rosa Rossini	Marlene Dauden, Ric Rodrigo, Paraluman, Juancho Gutierrez, Carlos Salazar, Tony Marzan	Romance, Drama	Conrado Conde	August 13–22, 1959	Dalisay Theater
	Kamandag	Paraluman (Elena), Jose Padilla, Jr. (Jose), Fred Montilla (Hugo), Rita Gomez (Esmeralda), Van de Leon (Benigno), Marlene Dauden (Rosa), Rosa Mia (Aling Dolor), Tony Marzan (Ubaldo), Eddie Garcia (Silvestre), Bert Olivar (Señor Ruperto), Venchito Galvez, Martin Marfil, Cora Maceda	Suspense, Drama	Jose de Villa	August 28 – September 6, 1959	
	Ipinagbili Kami ng aming Tatay	Dolphy, Juancho Gutierrez, Barbara Perez, Marlene Dauden, Liberty Ilagan, Greg Martin, Boy Planas, Rod Navarro, Eddie Gutierrez, Lito Legaspi, Boy Alano, The Wing Duo (Nikki and Angie), Meldy Corrales, Delia Marcos, Zeny Zabala, Elizabeth Ramsey	Comedy	Tony Cayado	November 16–25, 1959	Life Theater
	Kilabot sa Makiling	Mario Montenegro (Oscar), Lolita Rodriguez (Lillian), Van de Leon (Don Ambrosio), Romeo Vasquez, Eddie Garcia (Victor), Liberty Ilagan	Suspense, Action, Drama	Armando Garces	December 11–20, 1959	

== 1960s ==
=== 1960 ===
1960
#	Title	Cast(s)	Genre	Director	Date released	Theater
	Lupa sa Lupa	Gloria Romero (Nora), Lolita Rodriguez (Sofia), Luis Gonzales (Saldo), Eddie Garcia (Bert), Bella Flores (Bonita), Pablo Guevarra (Don Basilio), Venchito Galvez, Matimtiman Cruz, Boy Alano, Ely Roque	Drama	Mar S. Torres	January 10–19, 1960	
	Beatnik	Dolphy, Eddie Arenas, Susan Roces, Jose Mari, The Wing Duo (Nikki and Angie), Panchito Alba, Rod Navarro, Pacita Arana, Meldy Corrales, Nori Dalisay, Eddie Gutierrez, Lito Legaspi, Boy Alano, Mitos Seva, Elizabeth Ramsey	Musical, Romance	Tony Cayado	January 20–29, 1960	
	Double Cross	Rita Gomez, Luis Gonzales, Carlos Salazar, Tony Marzan, Martin Marfil, Bella Flores, Charlie Davao, Naty Santiago, Pablo Raymundo, Justina David, Aring Bautista, Jaime Javier, Banding Javier, Luis Castro, Wilfredo dado, Santiago Duenas	Action	Conrado Conde	January 26 – February 3, 1960	Life Theater
	Tatlong Patak na Luha	Ric Rodrigo (Lucio), Lolita Rodriguez (Julia), Carlos Salazar (Martin), Greg Martin, Liberty Ilagan, Zeny Zabala, Lito Legaspi, Boy Planas, Ven Medina, Pablo Guevarra, Aring Bautista, Matimtiman Cruz, Ely Roque, Lillian de Leon, Jose Villafranca, Juvy Cachola	Drama	Carlos Vander Tolosa	February 19–28, 1960	Dalisay Theater
	Ang Inyong Lingkod, Gloria Romero (Four stories)	Gloria Romero (as a lead cast)	Romance, Love story	Jose de Villa	March 5–14, 1960	Life Theater
Stories: 1. "Ang buhay ng tao'y gulong ang kabagay, kung minsan ay nasa ibabaw at kung minsan ay nasa ilalim."; Together with her partner Mario Montenegro: 2. "Hindi lahat ng kumikinang ay ginto."; Together with her partner Ric Rodrigo: 3. "Ang maniwala sa sabi sabi, walang bait sa sarili."; Together with her partner Luis Gonzales: 4. "Pag may hirap ay may ginhawa."; Together with her partner Juancho Gutierrez
	Love at First Sight	Tessie Agana, Jose Mari, Dolphy, The Wing Duo, Panchito, Meldy Corrales, Pacita Arana, Mitos Seva, The Bell Boys	Romance	Armando Garces	March 15–24, 1960	Life Theater
	Berdugo	Ric Rodrigo (Mando), Van de Leon (Leo), Marlene Dauden (Tusa), Daisy Romualdez (Mitus), Eddie Garcia (Don Ubaldo)	Suspense	Conrado Conde	March 30 – April 8, 1960	Dalisay Theater
	Kuwintas ng Alaala (Four Stories)	Paraluman, Oscar Moreno, Mario Montenegro, Luis Gonzales, Susan Roces, Jose Mari, Liberty Ilagan, Rosita Noble, Eddie Gutierrez, Marlene Dauden, Greg Martin, Naty Santiago	Romance	Mar S. Torres; Jose de Villa	April 22 – May 1, 1960	Majestic Theater
	Tatlong Magdalena	Carmen Rosales, Mila del Sol, Rita Gomez, Fred Montilla, Van de Leon, Eddie Garcia	Drama	Armando Garces	May 9–18, 1960	Dalisay Theater
	Laura (Ikaw ang Maysala)	Lolita Rodriguez, Luis Gonzales, Jose Mari, Tony Marzan, Liberty Ilagan, Rosita Noble	Drama	Ding M. de Jesus	June 18–27, 1960	Dalisay Theater
	Amy, Susie and Tessie	Amalia Fuentes, Susan Roces, Tessie Agana, Juancho Gutierrez, Romeo Vasquez, Jose Mari, Eddie Garcia, Paraluman	Comedy	Tony Cayado	July 3–12, 1960	Life Theater
	Estela Mondragon	Carmen Rosales (Estela Mondragon), Paraluman, Amalia Fuentes, Tito Galla, Liberty Ilagan, Eddie Gutierrez, Ernesto La Guardia	Drama	Mar S. Torres	August 22–31, 1960	
	Ipagdarasal Kita	Ric Rodrigo, Lolita Rodriguez, Luis Gonzales, Marlene Dauden, Rosa Mia, Zeny Zabala, Venchito Galvez, Nenita Navarro, Cesar Reyes, Pablo Raymundo, Maria Luisa Straight, Naty Mallares, Rudy Garcia, Hector Mallares	Romance, Drama	Octavio Silos	September 6, 1960	
	Kaming Makasalanan	Carmen Rosales, Rita Gomez, Katy dela Cruz, Eddie Garcia, Carlos Salazar, Etang Discher, Bella Flores, Ven Medina, Matimtiman Cruz, Eddie Gutierrez, Liberty Ilagan	Drama	Mar S. Torres	November 10–19, 1960	
	Bilanggong Birhen	Amalia Fuentes, Romeo Vasquez, Etang Discher, Rod Navarro, Nori Dalisay, Lito Legaspi, Pacita Arana, Ven Medina, Aring Bautista, Jose Villafranca, Matimtiman Cruz, Santiago Duenas	Drama	Carlos Vander Tolosa	December 10–19, 1960	

=== 1961 ===
1961
#	Title	Cast(s)	Genre	Director	Date released	Theater
	Dalawang Kalbaryo ni Dr. Mendez	Paraluman, Mario Montenegro, Liberty Ilagan, Eddie Gutierrez, Eddie Garcia, Jean Lopez	Suspense, Drama	Carlos Vander Tolosa	April 4, 1961	Dalisay Theater
	Alyas Sakay	Gloria Romero, Fred Montilla, Mario Montenegro, Tito Galla, Tony Marzan, Zeny Zabala	Action	Ding M. de Jesus	July 23 – August 1, 1961	Dalisay Theater
	Tindahan ni Aling Epang	Jose Mari, Liberty Ilagan, Chiquito, Matimtiman Cruz, Rod Navarro, Mitos Seva, Georgie Quizon, Horacio Morelos, Lillian Laing, Venchito Galvez	Comedy	Octavio Silos	August 7–16, 1961	Life Theater
	Ito Ba ang aking Ina?	Rita Gomez (Daria), Mario Montenegro (Waldo), Liberty Ilagan (Doris), Eddie Garcia (Primo), Lito Legaspi (Bert)	Drama	Octavio Silos	September 26 – October 1, 1961	
	Karugtong ng Kahapon	Mario Montenegro, Rita Gomez, Ric Rodrigo, Marlene Dauden, Carlos Salazar, Rosa Mia, Zeny Zabala, Totoy Torrente, Aring Bautista, Marcela Garcia	Drama	Eddie Garcia	November 5–14, 1961	

=== 1962 ===
1962
#	Title	Cast(s)	Genre	Director	Date released	Theater
	The Big Broadcast	Dolphy, Panchito, Amalia Fuentes, Jose Mari, Susan Roces, Eddie Gutierrez, Patsy, Chichay, Aruray, Carmen Rosales, Gloria Romero, Paraluman, Fred Montilla, Mario Montenegro, Rita Gomez, Ric Rodrigo, Lolita Rodriguez, Luis Gonzales, Juancho Gutierrez, Barbara Perez, Marlene Dauden, Liberty Ilagan, Carlos Salazar, Tito Galla, Tony Marzan, Greg Martin, Jean Lopez, Josephine Estrada, Lito Legaspi, Rosa Mia, Eddie Garcia, Meldy Corrales, Naty Santiago, Ruben Nieto, Mitos Seva, Bella Flores, Zeny Zabala, Luz Mat Castro, Letty Alonzo, Lillibeth Vera-Perez Nakpil, all the starlets and supporting players of Sampaguita Pictures	Musical	Tony Cayado	January 4, 1962	
	Sugat sa Balikat	Carmen Rosales, Jose Mari, Liberty Ilagan, Rosa Mia, Naty Santiago, Mitos Seva, Chichay, Jose Morelos, Charlie Davao, Maria Victoria, Ven Medina, Boy Alano	Drama	Ding M. de Jesus	January 24 –February 2, 1962	Life Theater
	Hiram na Kamay	Eddie Gutierrez, Josephine Estrada, Eddie Garcia, Tony Marzan, Marlene Dauden, Maria Victoria, Ven Medina, Ray Marcos	Drama, Romance	Tony Cayado	March 25, 1962	
	Magbayad ang May-utang	Paraluman, Rita Gomez, Luis Gonzales, Marlene Dauden, Tito Galla, Etang Discher, Ven Medina, Jose Villfranca, Horacio Morelos, Ely Roque, Ray Marcos, Nori Dalisay, Amparo Lucas, Aurita Sancho, Pablo Raymundo, Hector Mallares, Dolly Tarnate, Cesar Royo	Drama	Susana C. de Guzman	April 4–13, 1962	Life Theater
	Nagbalik na Kahapon	Gloria Romero, Fred Montilla, Ric Rodrigo, Juancho Gutierrez, Eddie Garcia, Bella Flores, Meldy Corrales, Johnny Misa	Drama	Conrado Conde	May 15, 1962	
	Kaming Mga Talyada	Juancho Gutierrez, Jose Mari, Tony Marzan, Rod Navarro, Boy Alano, Charlie Davao, Rodolfo "Boy" Garcia, Barbara Perez, Daisy Romualdez, Liberty Ilagan, Meldy Corrales, Naty Santiago, Juvy Cachola, Nori Dalisay, Eddie Garcia, Lillian Laing, Dindo Fernando, Miss Christine Jorgensen	Romance, Comedy	Tony Cayado	August 12, 1962	Life Theater
	7 Puso	Amalia Fuentes, Eddie Gutierrez, Tito Galla, Greg Martin, Lito Legaspi, Johnny Misa, Ray Marcos, Tony Dauden, Ven Medina, Jose Morelos, Paraluman	Romance	Rosa Mia	October 21, 1962	Life Theater
	Si Lucio at si Miguel	Dolphy (Lucio), Panchito (Miguel), Jean Lopez, Lito Legaspi, Juvy Cachola, Bert LeRoy, Jr.	Comedy	Octavio Silos	December 20–31, 1962	

=== 1963 ===
1963
#	Title	Cast(s)	Genre	Director	Date released	Theater
	Anak, Ang Iyong Ina!	Gloria Romero, Mario Montenegro, Rita Gomez, Tony Marzan, Vilma Santos, Eddie Garcia, Etang Discher, Maria Victoria, Ely Roque, Aring Bautista, Totoy Torrente, Nenita Navarro, Naty Mallares, Rosa Mia, Tony Cayado, Jose de Villa, Charlie Davao	Drama	Mar S. Torres	April 5, 1963	
	Dance-O-Rama	Susan Roces, Jose Mari, Rosemarie, Juvy Cachola, Dindo Fernando, Bert LeRoy, Jr., Blanca Gomez, Pepito Rodriguez, Meldy Corrales, Zeny Zabala, Mitos Seva, Boy Alano	Musical, Romance	Tony Cayado	April 14, 1963	Life Theater
	King and Queen for a Day	Dolphy, Chichay, Jose Mari, Liberty Ilagan, Panchito, Aruray, Naty Santiago, Johnny Misa, Ven Medina, Venchito Galvez, Vilma Santos, Herminia Carranza, Cora Maceda, Pepe Salameda, Naty Mallares, Apolonio Abadeza	Comedy, Romance	Mar S. Torres	July 3, 1963	Life Theater
	Ang Class Reunion	Liberty Ilagan, Lito Legaspi, Rosemarie, Dindo Fernando, Juvy Cachola, Bert LeRoy, Jr., Blanca Gomez, Pepito Rodriguez, Fred Montilla, Paraluman, Sarah Calvin, Loretta Marquez, Shirley Moreno, Boy Alano, Jose Morelos, Maria Victoria, German Moreno, Gina Pareño, Ely Roque, Naty Mallares, Isa Rino, Aring Bautista	Comedy	Rosa Mia	August 30 – September 8, 1963	Life Theater
	Pinakamalaking Takas ng 7 Atsay	Patsy, Dely Atay-Atayan, Chichay, Aruray, Elizabeth Ramsey, Menggay, Metring David, Jose Mari, Jean Lopez, Rodolfo “Boy” Garcia, Venchito Galvez, Jose de Villa, Tony Santos, Aring Bautista, Clara Yumul, Cora Maceda, Naty Mallares, Marcela Garcia, Jaime Javier	Comedy	Tony Santos	October 15, 1963	Life Theater
	Sabina	Susan Roces (Sabina), Eddie Gutierrez, Lito Legaspi, Bella Flores, Etang Discher, Charlie Davao, Boy Alano, Gina Pareño, Rodolfo “Boy” Garcia, German Moreno, Matimtiman Cruz, Nenita Navarro, Ven Medina, Jaime Javier	Drama, Romance	Jose de Villa	October 28, 1963	

=== 1964 ===
1964
#	Title	Cast(s)	Genre	Director	Date released	Theater
	Binibiro Lamang Kita	Carmen Rosales, Oscar Moreno, Susan Roces, Eddie Gutierrez, Shirley Moreno, Lillian Laing, Venchito Galvez, Aring Bautista, Hector Mallares	Romance	Luciano B. Carlos, Carlos Vander Tolosa	February 12, 1964	
	Bumunot Ka’t Lumaban	Nida Blanca, Luis Gonzales, Dindo Fernando, Zeny Zabala, Blanca Gomez, Loretta Marquez	Drama	Romy Villaflor	March 3, 1964	
	Ang Rosaryo at ang Tabak	Gloria Romero, Luis Gonzales, Josephine Estrada, Vic Vargas, Johnny Misa, Rosa Mia	Drama	Mar S. Torres	March 13, 1964	Life Theater
	Sa Bilis Walang Kaparis	Susan Roces, Vic Vargas, Lolita Rodriguez, Pepito Rodriguez, Charlie Davao, Martil Marfil, Gina Pareño, Boy Alano, German Moreno, Jose Morelos, Ray Marcos, Lillian Laing, Bella Flores, Rod Navarro, Ray Marcos, Nori Dalisay, Matimtiman Cruz, Willie Dado, Jaime Javier	Romance, Comedy	Jose de Villa	April 18, 1964	
	Leron, Leron Sinta	Susan Roces, Eddie Gutierrez, Liberty Ilagan, Meldy Corrales, Bella Flores, Gina Pareño, Vic Pacia, Tony Dauden, Lillian Laing, Hector Mallares	Romance, Musical	Rosa Mia	June 8, 1964	

=== 1966 ===
1966
#	Title	Cast(s)	Genre	Director	Date released	Theater
	Nais Ko Pang Mabuhay	Eddie Gutierrez, Divina Valencia, Paraluman, Norma Blancaflor, Ven Medina, Romeo Rivera, Pablo Raymundo, Naty Mallares, Cora Tarnate, Richard Merck, Caridad Pavico	Drama	Mar S. Torres	November 27, 1966	Life Theater

=== 1967 ===
1967
#	Title	Cast(s)	Genre	Director	Date released	Theater
	Bukod Kang Pinagpala	Gloria Romero, Luis Gonzales, Marlene Dauden, Norma Blancaflor, Etang Discher, Ven Medina, Rey Tomenes, Pablo Raymundo	Drama, Romance	Mar S. Torres	March 15, 1967	
	7 Bullets for Gringo	Vic Vargas, Dindo Fernando, Juvy Cachola, Shirley Moreno, Maria Victoria, Rey Tomenes, Jose Morelos, Renato del Prado, Venchito Galvez, Jaime Javier, Willie Dado, Pablo Raymundo, Verna Gaston, Loretta Rocco, Lyn D' Arce, Nonong Arceo, Apolonio Abadeza, Rudy Carballo, Fausto Tolentino, Eddie Cubos	Action	Marcelino H. Navarro	June 4, 1967	Life Theater
	Bus Stop	Rosemarie, Dindo Fernando, Blanca Gomez, Loretta Marquez, Edgar Salcedo, Ricky Belmonte, Boy Alano, German Moreno, Sarah Calvin, Lillian Laing, Pablo Raymundo	Comedy	Mar S. Torres	June 24, 1967	Life Theater
	To Love Again	Susan Roces, Eddie Gutierrez, Norma Blancaflor, Bella Flores, Boy Alano, Romeo Rivera, Ven Medina, Venchito Galvez, Naty Mallares, Bessie Barredo, Gina Laforteza, Maria Victoria, Verna Gaston	Romance	Mar S. Torres	September 2, 1967	Life Theater
	All Over the World	Eddie Gutierrez, Josephine Estrada, Rosemarie, Ricky Belmonte, Loretta Marquez, Norma Blancaflor, German Moreno, Nora Aunor, Verna Gaston, The Rolling Beats, 9 Teeners, D' Lollipops, St. Domitillas Choir, Romy Enriquez & D' Stags, Vilma Valera, Manding Claro, Boy Alano, Merci Molina, Baby Aguilar, Matimtiman Cruz, Ven Medina, Rey Tomenes, Dino Tuazon, Tessie Concepcion, Pablo Raymundo, Tita de Villa, Loretta Rocco, Aring Bautista	Musical	Conrado Conde	September 17, 1967	Life Theater
	Pogi	Eddie Gutierrez, Vilma Valera, Boy Alano, Bella Flores, Nori Dalisay, Matimtiman Cruz, Romeo Rivera, Ven Medina, Rey Tomenes, Danny Taguiam, Tita de Villa, Angge, Nora Aunor	Romance, Comedy	Marcelino Navarro	November 25, 1967	Life Theater

=== 1968 ===
1968
#	Title	Cast(s)	Genre	Director	Date released	Theater
	Pitong Krus ng isang Ina	Rosemarie, Ramil Rodriguez, Edgar Salcedo, Alicia Alonzo, Rosa Aguirre, Bella Flores, Romeo Rivera, Victor Wood, Matimtiman Cruz, Maria Victoria, Renato del Prado, Rey Tomenes, Rico Lopez, Linda Blanco, Verna Gaston	Drama	Mar S. Torres	May 25, 1968	Life Theater
	Bahay Kubo, Kahit Munti	Rosemarie, Blanca Gomez, Pepito Rodriguez, Edgar Salcedo, Ike Lozada, Nori Dalisay, Matimtiman Cruz, Lillian Laing, Venchito Galvez, Ben David, Aring Bautista, Nora Aunor, Danny Taguiam, Hector Gomez, Randy Pimentel 'Tawag ng Tanghalan' champions Elizabeth Ledesma, Nelson Doreza, Corazon Santos	Musical, Comedy	Jose de Villa	August 1, 1968	Life Theater
	Juanita Banana	Rosemarie, Pepito Rodriguez, Ricky Belmonte, Bella Flores, Boy Alano, German Moreno, Matimtiman Cruz, Ven Medina, Rey Tomenes, Randy Pimentel, Linda Martin, Danny Taguiam, Mila Jose, Eddie Miller	Comedy, Drama	Jose de Villa	September 20, 1968	Life Theater

=== 1969 ===
1969
#	Title	Cast(s)	Genre	Director	Date released	Theater
	9 Teeners	Rosemarie, Bert LeRoy, Jr., Ricky Belmonte, Jeanne Young, Nova Villa, Jackie Belmonte, Eddie Miller, Vivian Lorrain, Nora Aunor, German Moreno, Ike Lozada, Matimtiman Cruz, Rico Lopez, Ace York, Lyn Madrigal, The return of the fabulous mother-daughter team of Linda Estrella and Tessie Agana, Tessie Agana, Jr., The Cavalcade Dancers, The Rolling Beats, L' Claire, The Crystals	Musical	Mitos Villareal	January 1, 1969	
	Stop, Look, Listen	Bert LeRoy, Jr., Blanca Gomez, Pepito Rodriguez, Nova Villa, Jackie Belmonte, Jeanne Young, Eddie Miller, Elizabeth Bankhead, German Moreno, Ike Lozada, Tirso Cruz III, Boots Anson-Roa, Eddie Mercado, Joey Lardizabal, Etang Discher, Ven Medina, Venchito Galvez, Lillian Laing, Naty Mallares, Ed Finlan, Laura Danao and the Insiders, Manolo Brion and the Cavalcade Dancers, D' Crystals, Total Presence	Musical, Romance	Mitos Villareal	June 15, 1969	Maxim Theater
	Petrang Paminta	Jeanne Young, Pepito Rodriguez, Eddie Miller, Elizabeth Bankhead, Boy Alano, German Moreno, Linda Martin, Roderick Paulate, Elizabeth Ramsey, Venchito Galvez, Veronica Palileo, Loretta Rocco, Naty Mallares, Tita Ampil, Evelyn Bonifacio, Danny Lacsamana, Ernesto Roxas, Jose Briones, Nelson Martinez, Norma Blancaflor	Comedy, Drama	Mitos Villareal	November 22, 1969	Life Theater
	Rikitik Loves Rositik	Rosemarie, Ricky Belmonte, Eddie Miller, Tessie Agana, German Moreno, Linda Martin, Tessie Agana, Jr., Alicia Alonzo, Matimtiman Cruz, Glenn Bernardo, Gina Alajar, Boy Alajar, Herminia Carranza, Alma Lao, George Sinforoso, Romy Lapus, Tessie Velasco	Romance	Mar S. Torres	December 19, 1969	Life Theater

== 1970s ==
=== 1970 ===
1970
#	Title	Cast(s)	Genre	Director	Date released	Theater
	Orang	Nora Aunor, Tirso Cruz III, Ike Lozada, Boy Alano, German Moreno, Dely Atay-Atayan, Tita de Villa, Tinna Lapus, Ernesto Roxas, Ricky Valencia, Ricky Nicolas, Roger Bacani, Cloyd Robinson, Sonny Cortez	Romance, Comedy	Mar S. Torres	February 26, 1970	Life Theater Grand Theater
	Nasaan Ka, Inay?	Nora Aunor, Tirso Cruz III, Gloria Sevilla, Bella Flores, Matimtiman Cruz, Ven Medina, Glenn Bernardo, Evelyn Bonifacio, Tinna Lapus, Herminia Carranza, Naty Mallares, Sinforoso Jorge	Drama	Mar S. Torres	April 9, 1970	Life Theater
	First Kiss	Rosemarie, Ricky Belmonte, Fred Montilla, Rosa Mia, Glenn Bernardo, Ven Medina, Nenita Jana, Tita de Villa, Bobet Torres, Jose de Villa, Ely Roque, Pablo Raymundo, Aring Bautista, Sabas San Juan, Melody, Romy Lapus, Ricky Frias, D'Dynamites, D'People's Worry, Tita Aunor, Edna Barcoma	Romance	Tony Cayado Chito B. Tapawan	September 5, 1970	Life Theater
	Nananabik	Didith Reyes, Ricky Belmonte, Vic Silayan, Ruel Vernal, Ruffy Mendoza	Drama	Luciano B. Carlos	September 30, 1970	

=== 1972 ===
1972
#	Title	Cast(s)	Genre	Director	Date released	Theater
	The Sisters	Eddie Gutierrez, Maritess Revilla, Tina Revilla, Norma Blancaflor, Matimtiman Cruz, Eddie Miller, Ven Medina, Jigger Roces	Romance, Drama	Mar S. Torres	November 26, 1972	

=== 1973 ===
1973
#	Title	Cast(s)	Genre	Director	Date released	Theater
	Isa, Dalawa, Tatlo... (Magtago na Kayo!)	Tirso Cruz III, Jay Ilagan, Aurora Salve, Gina Alajar, German Moreno, Rodolfo "Boy" Garcia, Bella Flores, Ven Medina, Willie Dado, Ike Lozada	Comedy	Luciano B. Carlos	August 3, 1973	

=== 1977 ===
1977
#	Title	Cast(s)	Genre	Director	Date released	Theater
	Masikip Maluwang, Paraisong Parisukat	Christopher de Leon, Alma Moreno, Eddie Garcia, Nova Villa, Lorli Villanueva, Barbara Luna, Anita Linda, Bella Flores, Sandy Garcia	Drama	Elwood Perez	May 20, 1977	

== Produced by Vera-Perez Productions ==
#	Title	Genre	Director	Date released	Theater
1	Sino ang May-sala?	Drama	Armando Garces	1957	Life Theater
Cast: Rogelio de la Rosa (Rod), Gloria Romero (Gloria), Paraluman (Carmen), Ric Rodrigo, Lolita Rodriguez (Lolita), Luis Gonzales, Rosa Mia (Rosa), Susan Roces, Romeo Vasquez (Bobby), Van de Leon (Don Ramon), Etang Discher, Zeny Zabala, Bella Flores, Eddie Garcia
2	Mga Anak ng Diyos	Drama	Mar S. Torres Armando Garces Conrado Conde	April 19–28, 1957	Life Theater
Cast: Gloria Romero (Fe), Rita Gomez (Esperanza), Lolita Rodriguez (Caridad), Van de Leon, Juancho Gutierrez, Susan Roces, Rosa Mia, Romeo Vasquez, Tony Marzan
3	Pretty Boy	Romance	Armando Garces	1957	
Cast: Romeo Vasquez (Jaime), Van de Leon (Gaston), Amalia Fuentes (Cristy), Rosa Mia (Emilia), Rod Navarro (Dean), Zeny Zabala (Mercy), Jose de Villa, Aring Bautista, Jose Villafranca, Georgie Quizon, Bert Olivar, Ben Johnson, Terry Campillo, Jun Aristorenas, Vic Guevarra, Cecil Chico
	Palaboy	Romance, Drama	Mar S. Torres	May 4–13, 1958	Life Theater
Cast: Gloria Romero, Luis Gonzales, Jose Mari, Etang Discher, Bella Flores, Rod Navarro, Zeny Zabala, Isa Rinio, Cora Maceda
	Mga Anghel sa Lansangan	Drama	Mar S. Torres	September 19–26, 1959	Life Theater
Cast: Susan Roces (Linda), Jose Mari (Freddie), Rosa Mia, Tito Galla, Liberty Ilagan, Eddie Garcia (Leon)
	Vicky	Drama	Mar S. Torres	October 27 –November 5, 1959	Life Theater
Cast: Carmen Rosales, Gloria Romero, Ric Rodrigo, Greg Martin, Lillibeth Vera-Perez Nakpil, Ven Medina, Matimtiman Cruz, Precy Ortega, Boy Planas, Aring Bautista, Apolonio Rivera, Jr., Pepe Zalameda, Naty Mallares, Apolonia Aguilar, Lulu Tarnate
	Isinakdal Ko ang aking Ama	Drama	Armando Garces	February 4–13, 1960	Life Theater
Cast: Paraluman (Tony), Fred Montilla (Ramiro), Amalia Fuentes, Romeo Vasquez (Patricio), Tito Galla, Liberty Ilagan
	Sa Hardin ng Diyos	Drama	Mar S. Torres	April 9–18, 1960	Dalisay Theater
Cast: Fred Montilla, Juancho Gutierrez, Romeo Vasquez, Tito Galla, Amalia Fuentes, Susan Roces, Barbara Perez, Liberty Ilagan, Eddie Gutierrez, Meldy Corrales, Lito Legaspi, Boy Alano
	Pagpatak ng Ulan	Romance	Rosa Mia	May 24 – June 2, 1960	Life Theater
Cast: Gloria Romero, Mario Montenegro, Marlene Dauden, Greg Martin, Eddie Gutierrez
	28 de Mayo	Action, Drama	Jose de Villa	July 28 – August 6, 1960	
Cast: Van de Leon, Amalia Fuentes, Romeo Vasquez, Rosa Mia, Bella Flores, Naty Santiago, Jose Morelos, Maria Luisa Straight, Isa Rinio, Pablo Raymundo
	Ang Magkakapitbahay	Comedy	Tony Cayado	October 16–25, 1960	Dalisay Theater
Cast: Dolphy, Susan Roces, Jose Mari, Rosa Mia, Panchito, Jean Lopez, Horacio Morelos, Venchito Galvez
	Dugo sa aking Kamay	Suspense, Drama	Armando Garces	January 19, 1961	
Cast: Susan Roces, Romeo Vasquez, Barbara Perez, Tito Galla, Rosa Mia, Pablo Guevarra, Ven Medina, Venchito Galvez, Aring Bautista, Nenita Jana
	Eca Babagot	Comedy, Action	Tony Cayado	July 18–27, 1961	Life Theater
Cast: Luis Gonzales, Dolphy, Susan Roces, Jean Lopez, Panchito, Rod Navarro, Lillian Laing de Leon, Nello Nayo, Charlie Davao, Venchito Galvez, Horacio Morelos, Rodolfo "Boy" Garcia, Nori Dalisay, Meldy Corrales, Amparo Lucas, Aurita Sancho, Juvy Cachola, Jose Morelos, Johnny Misa, Tommy Corrales, Ray Marcos, Boy Alano, Dindo Fernando, Rey Javier
	Joey, Lito and Eddie	Comedy, Romance	Mar S. Torres	September 16, 1961	Life Theater
Cast: Jose Mari, Eddie Gutierrez, Lito Legaspi, Amalia Fuentes, Susan Roces, Liberty Ilagan, Horacio Morelos, Jose Villafranca, Venchito Galvez, Cora Maceda, Nena Perez Rubio, Herminia Carranza, Nena Ledesma, Lucien Pan, Santiago Duenas, Felipe Gomez
	Pitong Kalbaryo ni Inang	Drama	Jose de Villa	April 14, 1962	
Cast: Amalia Fuentes, Jose Mari, Daisy Romualdez, Jean Lopez, Greg Martin, Lito Legaspi, Eddie Garcia, Naty Santiago, Mitos Seva, Rosa Mia, Zeny Zabala, Dindo Fernando

== Produced by VP (Vera-Perez) Pictures ==
#	Title	Genre	Director	Date released	Theater
	Susanang Daldal	Comedy, Romance	Romy Villaflor	March 15, 1962	
Cast: Susan Roces (Susana), Dolphy, Panchito, Eddie Gutierrez, Jean Lopez, Lito Legaspi, Etang Discher, Bella Flores, Matimtiman Cruz, Venchito Galvez, Nori Dalisay, Amparo Lucas, Aurita Sancho, Lillian Laing, Charlie Davao
	Magic Guitar	Musical, Romance	Mar S. Torres	November 1, 1968	Life Theater
Cast: Rosemarie, Ricky Belmonte, Alicia Alonzo, Victor Wood, German Moreno, Bella Flores, Etang Discher, Lillian Laing, Renato del Prado, Maritess Quintana, Herminia Carranza, Naty Mallares, Pablo Raymundo, Willie Dado, Jaime Javier, Evelyn Bonifacio, Apolonio Abadeza, Belen Alcid
	Liku-Likong Landas	Drama	Emmanuel Borlaza	December 20, 1968	Life Theater
Cast: Gloria Romero, Luis Gonzales, Lolita Rodriguez, Van de Leon, Rita Gomez, Mario Montenegro, Marlene Dauden, Ramon Revilla, Barbara Perez, Tito Galla, Gina Pareño, Dindo Fernando, Rosa Mia
	Paula	Drama	Mar S. Torres	March 14, 1969	Life Theater
Cast: Gloria Romero, Gina Pareño, Ramil Rodriguez, Lauro Delgado, Rico Roman, Victor Wood, Alicia Alonzo, Bella Flores, Tita de Villa, Naty Mallares, Glenn Bernardo, Evelyn Bonifacio, Maria Victoria
	Dingdong	Musical, Romance	Mar S. Torres	July 17, 1970	Life Theater
Cast: Tirso Cruz III, Vilma Santos, Ike Lozada, Boy Alano, German Moreno, Norma Blancaflor, Dely Atay-Atayan, Ven Medina, Aurora Salve, Letty Trinidad, Connie Angeles, Maribel Aunor, Bobbet Torres, Naty Mallares, Cristina English, Amor Villegas, Alfredo Esguerra, Rene Rodriguez, Richard Dumaran, Ricky Valencia, Bella Flores
	Robina	Drama	Mar S. Torres	February 12, 1971	Life Theater
Cast: Gina Alajar (Robina), Gloria Romero (Auring), Luis Gonzales (Danilo), Aurora Salve (Loleng), Zandro Zamora (Zandro), Rodolfo "Boy" Garcia (Poldo), Lucita Soriano (Merced), Von Serna (Fernan), Etang Discher (Doña Tarcila), Cristina English (Cora), Naty Mallares

== Produced by Sampaguita-VP Pictures ==
#	Title	Genre	Director	Date released	Theater
	A Gift of Love	Romance	Danny Holmsen	February 11, 1972	Life Theater
Cast: Nora Aunor, Tirso Cruz III, Luis Gonzales, German Moreno, Ludy Carvajal, Myrna Delgado, Robert Evans, Michael Harris
	And God Smiled at Me	Drama	Mar S. Torres Danny Holmsen	October 15–24, 1972	New Frontier Theater Grand Theater Circle Theater
Cast: Nora Aunor, Tirso Cruz III, Luis Gonzales, Lucita Soriano, Rosa Mia, Matimtiman Cruz, Naty Santiago, Nympha Bonifacio, Monia Rojo, Ven Medina, Nenita Jana, Jose de Villa, Aring Bautista
	Kondesang Basahan	Drama	Danny Holmsen	February 10, 1973	
Cast: Nora Aunor, Jay Ilagan, Zandro Zamora, German Moreno, Rosa Mia, Matimtiman Cruz, Raquel Monteza, Lolita Lopez, Aring Bautista, Sim Jorge, Willie Dado
	Maalaala Mo Kaya	Musical, Drama	Danny Holmsen	June 29, 1973	
Cast: Nora Aunor, Tirso Cruz III, Jimmy Morato, Alicia Alonzo, Naty Mallares, Lolita Lopez, Rey Tomenes, Matimtiman Cruz
	Hindi Kita Malimot	Romance, Drama	Danny Holmsen	December 22, 1973	
Cast: Nora Aunor, Tirso Cruz III, Rosa Mia, Matimtiman Cruz, Ricky Valencia, Ven Medina, Naty Mallari, Aring Bautista, Maribel Aunor, Jayne del Rosario

== Sampaguita Pictures ==
1939
#	Title	Genre	Director	Theater
	Dalisay	Drama, Musical, Romance	Manuel Silos	
Cast: Rogelio dela Rosa, Ernesto La Guardia, Corazon Noble, Nati Rubi, Quiel Segovia, Fely Vallejo
	Inang Mahal	Drama		
Cast: Rosario Moreno, Rogelio de la Rosa, Soledad Aquino, Teddy Benavidez, Carmen Martinez, Melquiades Francisco, Freddy Querry, Mariano Adan, Rolando Liwanag, Ramon Escudero

1940
#	Title	Genre	Director	Theater
	Alitaptap	Romance	Lamberto Avellana	
Cast: Elsa Oria, Leopoldo Salcedo, Jose Luz Bernardo, Guillermo Carls, Fidel de Castro, Pacita del Rio, Pugo, Nati Rubi, Gregorio Ticman, Togo
	Colegiala	Romance	Gregorio Fernandez	
Cast: Rogelio dela Rosa, Carmen Rosales, Rita Rica, Bert LeRoy, Juanita Angeles, Lota Delgado, Gregorio Fernandez, Engracio Ibarra, Precioso Palma, Octavio Romero, Nardo Vercudia
	Diwa ng Awit	Romance, Musical, Drama	Manuel Silos	
Cast: Rogelio dela Rosa, Carmen Rosales, Africa dela Rosa, Franco Garcia, Bert LeRoy, Precioso Palma, Jose Cris Soto

1941
#	Title	Genre	Director	Theater
	Serenata sa Nayon	Romance, Drama	Carlos Vander Tolosa	Life Theater
Cast: Florentino Ballecer, Norma Blancaflor, Monang Carvajal, Pedro Faustino, Celia Moreno, Pugo, Fernando Royo, Ben Rubio, Togo
