= Sino ang Maysala? =

1957 Philippine film directed by Armando Garces

- Promotional poster
- Directed by: Armando Garces
- Screenplay by: Luciano B. Carlos; Armando Garces
- Story by: Fausto J. Galauran
- Produced by: Jose O. Vera
- Starring: Rogelio de la Rosa; Gloria Romero; Paraluman; Ric Rodrigo; Lolita Rodriguez; Luis Gonzales; Rosa Mia; Susan Roces; Romeo Vasquez
- Cinematography: Steve Perez
- Edited by: Jose H. Tarnate; Dick Treyes
- Music by: Carding Cruz; Tirso Cruz Band
- Production company: Vera-Perez Productions
- Distributed by: Sampaguita Pictures
- Release date: March 10, 1957
- Country: Philippines
- Language: Filipino
- Box office: ₱83,154 (₱14.6 million in 2025 Philippine peso)

Sino ang Maysala? (lit. 'Who is at fault?') is a 1957 Philippine drama film directed by Armando Garces from a screenplay he co-wrote with Luciano B. Carlos. Adapted from the serialized novel of the same name by Fausto J. Galauran, it features an ensemble cast which includes Rogelio de la Rosa, Gloria Romero, Paraluman, Ric Rodrigo, Lolita Rodriguez, Luis Gonzales, Rosa Mia, Susan Roces and Romeo Vasquez.

Sino ang Maysala? was the highest-grossing Filipino film of 1957. It was nominated for seven FAMAS Awards, including Best Picture and Best Director, winning two: Best Actress for Paraluman and Best Story for Galauran.

== Plot ==
Don Ramon killed himself because of his bankruptcy, leaving his wife, Rosa (Rosa Mia), and their four children, Carmen (Paraluman), Gloria (Gloria Romero), Lolita (Lolita Rodriguez), and Bobby (Romeo Vasquez) with nothing. In order to fill the void left by her father, Carmen, the oldest, promised to send her siblings to school. One by one, Carmen sold her jewelry until everything was gone, except for a pendant that featured a picture of her former partner, Rod (Rogelio de la Rosa). She suddenly ran across Rod in a nightclub one evening. Rod, who was now married, still harbored feelings for Carmen. However, Rod's marriage to his wife, Bella Flores, was in ruins, and his fortuitous encounter with Carmen inadvertently reignited their strained connection.

Before Carmen's family learned about their unlawful connection, everything between the two lovers was going well. Gloria and Lolita avoided Carmen because they were angry, irritated, and humiliated of what had transpired, but both sisters also had their own issues. In the midst of all these controversies, the young and vulnerable Bobby quickly turned violent and disobedient. After engaging in minor altercations and thefts, he quickly turned to criminality. He was apprehended and tried. He attributed all of his tragedies and sufferings to his family.

== Cast ==
- Rogelio de la Rosa as Rod
- Gloria Romero as Gloria
- Paraluman as Carmen
- Ric Rodrigo
- Lolita Rodriguez as Lolita
- Luis Gonzales
- Rosa Mia as Rosa
- Susan Roces
- Romeo Vasquez as Bobby
- Van de Leon
- Eddie Garcia
- Bella Flores
- Panchito Alba
- Tony Cayado
- Jose de Villa
- Etang Discher
- Aring Bautista

== Release ==
Sino ang Maysala? was the first film produced under the Vera-Perez Productions, the subsidiary production arm of Sampaguita Pictures. Its premiere night was attended by former first lady Luz Magsaysay. The film reportedly grossed ₱83,154 at the Philippine box office, making it the highest-grossing Filipino film of 1957.

== Accolades ==
Award	Category	Nominee(s)	Result	Ref.
FAMAS Awards	Best Picture	Sino ang Maysala?	Nominated	
FAMAS Awards	Best Director	Armando Garces	Nominated	
FAMAS Awards	Best Actress	Paraluman	Won	
FAMAS Awards	Best Supporting Actor	Romeo Vasquez	Nominated	
FAMAS Awards	Best Screenplay	Luciano B. Carlos and Armando Garces	Nominated	
FAMAS Awards	Best Story	Fausto Galauran	Won	
FAMAS Awards	Best Editing	Jose H. Tarnate and Dick Treyes	Nominated	

== See also ==
- Highest-grossing Filipino films of 1957
- List of Philippine films of the 1950s
- Darna vs. the Planet Women
