= Dalisay =

Dalisay means "pure" in the Filipino language. It is also a type of traditional Filipino liquor made from palm sap in the Visayas Islands. It can refer to:

- Dalisay de nipa, or laksoy, made from nipa palm sap; also known simply as "dalisay"
- Dalisay de coco, or lambanog, made from coconut palm sap
- Dalisay, a Philippine film of 1939

== See also ==
- Dalisay (surname)
