= Maria Clara Awards =

Philippine cinematic achievement award

- Awarded for: Excellence in cinematic achievements
- Country: Philippines
- Presented by: Manila Times Publishing, Co. (1951-1952), a group led by Col. Jimmy Tiu (2006)
- First award: 1951
- Final award: 2006

The Maria Clara Awards is the first formal film industry award-giving body of the Philippines. It was established in 1950 by a group of writers from the Manila Times Publishing, Co., which included National Artist Dr. Alejandro Roces, regarded as the Father of the Maria Clara Awards. It was the initial answer of the Philippines to Hollywood's Academy Awards, an institution for recognizing talents in the Filipino movie industry.

== History ==
After World War II ended, the two pre-war movie studios, LVN and Sampaguita Pictures, resumed their movie production and were later joined by two other movie studios, Premiere Productions and Lebran International, to form the "Big Four" studios who held the brightest stars and top artisans of Philippine movies in the 1950s and 1960s.

=== 1950 ===
The first formal Filipino answer to the Oscars was formed by Manila Times Publishing, Co. To make a statuette which would be given out to the best of the best, National Artist Guillermo Tolentino was asked to sculpt the bronze Maria Clara Award, which bore the likeness of Maria Clara, one of the characters in Jose Rizal's Noli Me Tangere.

=== 1952 ===
Due to various reactions about the voting procedures of the Maria Claras (various factions have pointed out that the Maria Claras were voted on mostly by movie columnists), a group of movie writers, Atty. Flavio G. Macaso (who became the first president of FAMAS), future FAMAS president Vic Generoso, future FAMAS winner Mario Mijares Lopez, Paulo Dizon, Amado Yasoma and Eddie Infante established what would become as the second oldest film industry award-giving body in Asia, the Filipino Academy of Movie Arts and Sciences or FAMAS. With the creation of FAMAS, the Maria Claras folded up.

=== 2006 ===
Maria Clara Award's descendant, the FAMAS Awards, is undergoing a leadership crisis and registration revocation from the Securities and Exchange Commission. The latter did not allow for the FAMAS to hold any of their major functions, which included an awards night. To go around the ruling of the SEC, FAMAS President Jimmy Tiu, with the support of Dr. Alejandro Roces, held the Maria Clara Awards on October 13, 2006, as a temporary replacement for the FAMAS Awards until the issues on leadership and with the SEC can be settled. The Maria Clara Awards held in 2006 was numbered 55th to correspond with the two Maria Clara Awards presentations in 1951 and 1952 and fifty-three FAMAS Awards presentations from 1953-2005.

The 55th Maria Clara Awards, the first Maria Clara Awards in 54 years (and the first defunct awards ever resurrected in Philippine film awards history), was held on October 13, 2006, at the Golden Fortune Restaurant in Manila. A low-key event which was attended by Film Academy of the Philippines Director-General and FAMAS nominee Leo Martinez and National Commission for the Culture and the Arts Executive Director Cecille Guidote-Alvarez, among others, most of the winners were not present during the awards due to short notice (invitations were handed out three days before the awards).

== List of previous winners ==
The following are incomplete lists of winners on the first two Maria Clara Awards, the forerunner of FAMAS Awards, and the 2006 Awards:

=== First Maria Clara Awards (1950) ===
Award	Recipient
Grand Prix	Kamay ni Satanas
Best Actor	Reynaldo Dante, for Kamay Ni Satanas
Best Actress	Nena Cardenas, for 48 Oras
Best Supporting Actor	Jose Padilla, Jr., Hantik
Best Supporting Actress	Alicia Vergel, Mga Mapuputing Kamay
Best Director	Eddie Romero, Ang Prinsesa at ang Pulubi
Best Musical Score	Julio Esteban, The Spell
Best Cinematographer	Higino J. Fallorina, Baguio Cadets
Best Sound Recording	Charles Gray
Best Child Star	Mila Nimfa, Nanay Ko

=== Second Maria Clara Awards (1951) ===
Award	Recipient
Grand Prix	Sisa
Best Actor	Jose Padilla, Jr., Diego Silang
Best Actress	Anita Linda, Sisa
Best Supporting Actress	Rosa Mia, Roberta
Best Child Star	Tessie Agana, Ang Prinsesa at ang Pulubi
Best Director	Enrique Moreno, Ang Prinsesa at ang Pulubi
Best Screenplay	Teodorico C. Santos, Diego Silang
Best Music	Tito Arevalo, Diego Silang
Best Cinematography	Higino J. Fallorina, Roberta

=== 55th Maria Clara Awards (2006) ===
Award	Recipient
Best Picture	Blue Moon (Regal Films)
Best Actor	Aga Muhlach, Dubai
Best Actress	Claudine Barretto, Dubai
Best Supporting Actor	John Lloyd Cruz, Dubai
Best Supporting Actress	Hilda Koronel, Nasaan Ka Man
Best Director	Joel Lamangan, Blue Moon
Best Screenplay	Ricky Lee, John Paul Abellera and Shaira Mella Salvador, Dubai
Best Sound	Arnold Reodica, Dubai
Best Editing	Marya Ignacio, Dubai
Best Musical Score	Jesse Lucas, Can This Be Love
Best Story	Allan Tijamo, Blue Moon
