= Ging (film) =

1964 film

- Directed by: Cirio H. Santiago; Teodorico C Santos
- Starring: Vilma Santos
- Release date: 1964
- Country: Philippines
- Languages: Filipino; Tagalog

Ging is a 1964 Philippine family drama film, starring Vilma Santos in the title role. The film is in the Filipino and Tagalog languages.

The film was released by People's Pictures on January 20, 1964. It was directed by Cirio H. Santiago and Teodorico C Santos. It is based on a comic by Mars Ravelo and Elpidio Torres in the Liwayway Magazine.

== Cast of characters ==
- Vilma Santos
- José Padilla, Jr.
- Olivia Cenizal
- Carol Varga
- Ramon d'Salva
- Aruray
- Ponga
- Etang Discher
- Georgie Quizon
- Jose Garcia
- Paquito Salcedo
- Eva Montes
