= Olivia Cenizal =

Filipina actress

- Born: Gloria Pagtakhan Maigue; October 21, 1926; Imus, Cavite, Philippine Islands
- Died: April 14, 2008 (aged 81); Philippines
- Occupation: Actress
- Years active: 1955–1964

Olivia Cenizal (October 21, 1926 – April 14, 2008) was a Filipina film actress.

== Early life and career ==
She was born as Gloria Pagtakhan Maigue in Imus, Cavite into a musical family. She was reportedly encouraged by Cirio H. Santiago to become a film actress. Her film debut was in Palahamak (1955). Her name was changed to Olivia because Gloria Romero was already prominent in the local cinema and because Cenizal reportedly resembled the American film actress Olivia de Havilland.

Cenizal was twice nominated for a Famas Best Actress Award, for Desperado (1956), and Water Lily (1958). Cenizal retired from an active film career in the 1970s, though she occasionally appeared in films until the 1990s.

== Death ==
Olivia Cenizal died on April 14, 2008, aged 81, from complications from an undisclosed colon disease. She was survived by her husband, Josefino Cenizal, a composer.

== Filmography ==
- 1955 - Palahamak
- 1955 - Minera
- 1955 - Ha Cha Cha
- 1955 - Pangako ng Puso
- 1955 - Pandanggo ni Neneng
- 1955 - Pitong Maria
- 1956 - Desperado
- 1956 - Margarita
- 1956 - Prinsipe Villarba
- 1956 - Haring Espada
- 1957 - Libre Comida
- 1957 - Bicol Express
- 1957 - Prinsipe Alejandre at Don Luis
- 1958 - Man on the Run
- 1958 - Water Lily
- 1958 - Obra-Maestra
- 1964 - Ging
