= Dalisay (surname) =

Dalisay is a surname. Notable people with the surname include:

- Jose Dalisay Jr. (born 1954), Filipino writer
- Nori Dalisay (born 1938), Filipina actress

Fictional characters

- Cardo Dalisay, a lead character from the 2015 Philippine action drama TV series FPJ's Ang Probinsyano
