= Joseph Tushinsky =

Joseph Tushinsky (1910 in New York City – 1988 in Encino, California) was an American electronics industry pioneer, inventor and musician. He is considered to be "The Father of Stereo". In 1964 Superscope Inc. purchased the Marantz Co., the Audio Electronics mfg. founded by Saul Marantz.

== Personal life ==
Tushinsky was married to Rebecca Del Rio, a Filipina actress.
