= Sa Bilis Walang Kaparis =

- Directed by: Jose de Villa
- Screenplay by: Emmanuel Borlaza
- Story by: Emmanuel Borlaza; Goyito Leonardo
- Produced by: Jose O. Vera
- Starring: For the complete cast, see below.
- Music by: Danny Holmsen
- Production company: Sampaguita Pictures
- Release date: April 6, 1964
- Country: Philippines
- Language: Filipino

Sa Bilis Walang Kaparis is a 1964 Tagalog language black and white action movie made in the Philippines. It was directed by Jose de Villa and distributed by Sampaguita Pictures.

== Cast ==
- Susan Roces
- Vic Vargas
- Lolita Rodriguez
- Pepito Rodriguez
- Charlie Davao
- Martin Marfil
- Gina Pareño
- Boy Alano
- German Moreno
- Jose Morelos
- Ray Marcos
- Lilian Laing
- Bella Flores
- Rod Navarro
- Nori Dalisay
- Matimtiman Cruz
- Willie Dado
- Jaime Javier
