= Tita de Villa =

Filipino actress (1931–2014)

- Born: Teresa Viel Theodossis; 3 April 1931; Philippine Islands
- Died: February 7, 2014 (aged 82); Philippines
- Occupation: Actress
- Years active: 1954–2000

Teresa Theodossis-Martin (3 April 1931 – 7 February 2014), better known by her stage name Tita de Villa, was a Filipino actress. Her long acting career started in 1954 in a Sampaguita Pictures movie, Dalagang Ilocana (Ilocana Maiden), the movie which also catapulted the career of actress Gloria Romero into stardom. In the film, De Villa played a bit role of a lady boarder. Typecasted into playing antagonistic roles, De Villa is perhaps known for her portrayal of the scheming matriarch, Mena, in the highly successful soap opera Gulong ng Palad in the late 1970s until the mid 1980s. She was married to Manuel Martin, known to most as the director Jose de Villa.

== Filmography ==
=== Film ===
- Dalagang Ilocana (1954)
- Anak sa Panalangin (1954)
- R.O.T.C. (1955)
- Portrait of My Love
- Iginuhit ng Tadhana (The Ferdinand E. Marcos Story) (1965)
- Jamboree '66 (1966)
- Sitting in the Park (1967)
- Pogi (1967)
- Let's Dance the Soul! (1967)
- All Over the World (1967)
- Way Out in the Country (1967)
- Cinderella A-Go-Go (1967)
- Kamatayan Ko ang Ibigin Ka (1968)
- Junior Cursillo (1968)
- Ikaw Ay Akin, Ako Ay sa Iyo (1968)
- Elizabeth (1968)
- Deborrah (1968)
- Paula (1969)
- Orang (1970)
- My Heart Belongs to Daddy (1971)
- Fiesta Extravaganza '71 (1971)
- Lumuha Pati Mga Anghel (1971)
- Little Darling (1972)
- Mr. Lonely (1972)
- Kamay na Gumagapang (1974)
- Mortal (1975)
- Batu-Bato sa Langit (1975)
- Nunal sa Tubig (1976)
- Ang Pagbabalik ni Harabas at Bulilit (1977)
- Doble Kara (1978)
- Darna, Kuno...? (1979)
- Pepe en Pilar (1984)
- Adultery (Aida Macaraeg, Case no. 7892) (1984)
- Anak ni Waray vs Anak ni Biday (1984)
- Super Wan-Tu-Tri (1985)
- White Slavery (1985)
- Babaing Hampaslupa (1988)
- Here Comes the Bride (1989)
- Island of Desire (1990)
- Cedie (1996)
- Mapanuksong Hiyas (1997)
- Abandonada (2000)

=== Television ===
- Gulong ng Palad (1977)
- Ipaglaban Mo! (Episode: "Nasa Tao ang Gawa", 1995)
- Calvento Files (2 episodes, 1996)
- Wansapanataym (2 episodes, 1997-1999)

== See also ==
- List of Filipino actresses
