= Aruray =

Filipino actress and comedian (1922–1988)

- Born: Socorro de la Cruz; July 18, 1922; Calamba, Laguna, Philippine Islands, U.S.
- Died: 1988 (aged 65–66); Manila, Philippines
- Occupations: Actress, comedian, dancer
- Years active: 1946–1986

Socorro de la Cruz (July 18, 1922 – 1988), or more popularly known as Aruray, was a Filipino actress and comedian who made many movies produced by her home studio Sampaguita Pictures. She was one of the most successful comedians of the 1950s until 1980s, and was often partnered with Chichay, another famous comedienne, of that time. She was from Calamba, Laguna, and her parents were Braulio de la Cruz and Eusebia Diaz.

== Filmography ==
- 1946 - Hanggang Pier
- 1949 - Damit Pangkasal
- 1950 - Kundiman ng Luha - Balintawak Pictures
- 1950 - Campo O' Donnell
- 1950 - 13 Hakbang
- 1950 - Kay Ganda Mo Neneng
- 1951 - Kasaysayan ni Dr. Ramon Selga
- 1951 - Roberta
- 1951 - Kasintahan sa Pangarap
- 1951 - Tres Muskiteros
- 1952 - Mayamang Balo
- 1952 - Lihim ng Kumpisalan
- 1952 - Buhay Pilipino
- 1953 - Munting Koronel
- 1953 - Anak ng Espada
- 1953 - Apat na Taga
- 1953 - Sa Isang Sulyap Mo Tita
- 1953 - Recuerdo
- 1954 - Maalaala Mo Kaya
- 1954 - Tres Muskiteras
- 1954 - Matandang Dalaga
- 1954 - MN
- 1954 - Ang Biyenang Hindi Tumatawa
- 1954 - Dumagit
- 1954 - Kurdapya
- 1955 - Lola Sinderella
- 1955 - Mariposa
- 1955 - Despatsadora
- 1955 - Kontra Bida
- 1955 - Bim Bam Bum
- 1956 - Kanto Girl
- 1958 - Glory at Dawn - PMP
- 1962 - Ang Pitong Atsay
- 1962 - Ang Pinakamalaking Takas (Ng Pitong Atsay)
- 1963 - King and Queen for a Day
- 1963 - Magic Bilao
- 1964 - Libis ng Baryo
- 1964 - Ang Senyorito at ang Atsay
- 1964 - Ging
