= Darna, Kuno...? =

- Theatrical poster
- Directed by: Luciano B. Carlos
- Written by: Luciano B. Carlos; Toto Belano
- Based on: Darna by Mars Ravelo
- Produced by: Lily Monteverde
- Starring: Dolphy; Lotis Key; Brenda Del Rio
- Cinematography: Claro Gonzales; Ricardo Jacinto
- Edited by: Rogelio Salvador
- Music by: Ernani Cuenco; Levi Celerio
- Production company: Regal Films
- Release date: March 30, 1979
- Running time: 125 minutes
- Country: Philippines
- Language: Filipino

Darna, Kuno...? (lit. 'Darna, for real?') is a 1979 Filipino film directed by Luciano B. Carlos and co-written by Toto Belano. Produced under the action comedy and fantasy genres, it is a parody of Mars Ravelo's comic book character and female superhero Darna. The role of Darna Kuno is played by Filipino actor, Dolphy. The film was released on March 30, 1979. Darna was first published on May 13, 1950, written by Mars Ravelo and illustrated by Nestor Redondo, who illustrated for DC and Marvel Comics.

In the film, the superheroine Darna is pregnant and can not perform her heroic duties until she gives birth. She appoints a man as her temporary replacement. Darna's magical stone transforms the man into a cross-dressing superhero who wears Darna's feminine costume. The replacement has to defend his position against other would-be replacements of Darna. And all of the would-be heroes have to fight against an alien invasion.

== Plot ==
Dondoy (Dolphy) is a tricycle driver who was an admirer of Annabel (Key). Dondoy was ridiculed by Annabel's sister, Estelga (Delgado), and her mother (de Villa), who became kind as the story progresses. The superhero Darna (Del Rio) lends Dondoy her magical stone, explaining that she needs him to temporarily take her place after the Japanese anime robots Voltes V and Mazinger Z raped her and made her pregnant.

When swallowed and the name Darna is shouted aloud, the magical stone transformed Narda, Darna's alter-ego, into Darna. Dolphy, as the Darna Pretender, fought enemies such as tikbalangs and aswangs. Upon learning of Darna Kuno's secret identity, Annabel became Darna Kuno after she stole the magical stone from Dolphy. Both male and female Darna Pretenders fought and defeated alien invaders. The true Darna returned to retrieve her magical stone, carrying her baby who was wearing a Darna costume.

== Cast ==
- Dolphy as Dondoy / Darna Kuno 1
- Lotis Key as Anabelle / Darna Kuno 2
- Marissa Delgado as Estelga
- Tita de Villa as Anabel and Estelga's mother
- Romy Nario
- Tonio Gutierrez
- Dijay Dadivas
- Karlo Vero

=== Special guest appearances ===
- Brenda del Rio as Darna
- German Moreno as San Pedro
- Sandy Garcia
- Christopher de Leon as Chris, Anabelle's cousin
- Bella Flores as the chief manananggal
- Celia Rodriguez as the organ player who stole the brides
- Charo Valdez
- Rio Locsin
- Lily Miraflor
- Ruel Vernal as the spaceship alien
- Bata Batuta Characters
  - Alice Kamatis
  - Kardong Kayod
  - Tak-talaok

== See also ==
- Zsazsa Zaturnnah
