= Kundiman ng Puso =

- Directed by: Tony Cayado
- Screenplay by: Susana C. de Guzman; Chito Tapawan
- Story by: Susana C. de Guzman
- Produced by: Dr. Jose O. Vera
- Starring: Lolita Rodriguez; Marlene Dauden
- Music by: Dr. Rodolfo Cornejo
- Production company: Sampaguita Pictures
- Release date: January 4, 1958
- Country: Philippines
- Language: Filipino

Kundiman ng Puso (transl. Song of the Heart) is a 1958 Philippine musical-romantic film produced by Sampaguita Pictures. The film is in black and white.

== Plot ==
Rodriguez and Dauden play sisters and Arenas and Marzan best friends who go abroad to Italy for work. Arenas becomes angry when Rodriguez sends a letter that she is pregnant.

== Cast ==
- Lolita Rodriguez
- Eddie Arenas
- Marlene Dauden
- Tony Marzan
- Nori Dalisay
- Rod Navarro
