= Carlos Salazar (actor) =

Filipino actor (1931–2022)

- Born: Rustico Roldan; October 26, 1931; Manila, Philippines
- Died: April 7, 2022 (aged 90); Quezon City, Philippines
- Occupation: Actor
- Years active: 1952–1991; 2014; 2017

Rustico Roldan (October 26, 1931 – April 7, 2022), professionally known as Carlos Salazar was a Filipino actor and a matinee idol in the 1950s. A contemporary of the likes of Delia Razon, Rosa Rosal, Jaime Dela Rosa and Nestor de Villa, Roldan took up the screen name of Carlos Salazar and began his career with LVN Pictures, and made several hit movies. After making 15 films for the said studio, Salazar made one film under Champion Pictures entitled Objective: Patayin si Magsaysay, and one film under Larry Santiago Production for Student Canteen.

His first film under Sampaguita Pictures was Madaling Araw, an Amalia Fuentes and Juancho Gutierrez movie, followed by Alaalang Banal ("Sacred Memory"), which starred Gloria Romero.

Then he made another film with Lolita Rodriguez and Luis Gonzales under the title of Talipandas ("Traitor").

== Later career ==
Salazar remained active as a film actor up to mid-1990s.

He also produced and directed films for his brother-in-law, action star Eddie Fernandez. Salazar's last television appearance was on Be Careful with My Heart in 2014.

== Personal life ==
Salazar was married to model Carmen "Menchu" Fernandez until her death in 2013. They had seven children.

In the aftermath of the People Power Revolution, Salazar was often seen as a Marcos loyalist for attending events led by pro-Marcos protesters, although he himself denied being a supporter of Marcos. He was present at the Manila Hotel during the July 1986 coup attempt led by Arturo Tolentino against the Aquino administration. In August 1986, he was briefly arrested alongside Fernando Diaz, a loyalist, by police authorities for being a suspect in the August 19 murder of Felizardo Lota, a former Batangas prosecutor who chaired the Civilian Marcos Loyalists (CML), near the parking lot gate of the Hilton Hotel (now Waterfront Manila Hotel) in Manila, but was let go after no solid evidence was found linking him to the incident.

He died peacefully on April 7, 2022 at home in Quezon City.

== Filmography ==
- Tia Loleng (1952)
- Digmaan ng Damdamin (1952)
- Philippine Navy (1953)
- Ganyan Lang ang Buhay (1953)
- Dalagang Nayon (1953)
- Abarinding (1954)
- Mabangong Kandungan (1954)
- Hiram Na Kasintahan (1954)
- Tagapagmana (1955)
- Pasikat (1955)
- Ang Ibong Adarna (1955)
- Karnabal (1955)
- Salamangkero (1955)
- May Araw Ka Rin (1956)
- Abandonado (1956)
- Objective: Patayin si Magsaysay (1957)
- Student Canteen (1957)
- Rubi-Rosa (1957)
- Pulot-Gata (1958)
- Madaling Araw (1958)
- Alaalang Banal (1958)
- Talipandas (1958) – Andy
- Mga Kuwento ni Lola Basyang (1958)
- Pitong Pagsisisi (1959)
- Tanikalang Apoy (1959)
- Cicatriz (1959)
- Rosa Rossini (1959)
- Esmeralda (1959)
- Double Cross (1960)
- Tatlong Patak Na Luha (1960) – Martin
- Salamat Po, Doktor (1960)
- Ginang Hukom ("Case No. 4" segment; 1960)
- Kaming Makasalanan (1960)
- Nakasakdal sa Langit (1961)
- Kapitan Lolita Limbas (1961)
- Si Darna at ang Impakta (1963)
- Big Four (1963)
- Contra Cuatro (1964)
- Ang Mga Sandatahan (1965)
- Sa Baril Magtuos (1965)
- Project Kill (1976) – Insp. Ortiz
- Ang Anino ni Asedillo (1988)
- Seth Corteza (1996)
