= Tessie Agana =

Filipina former child actress

- Born: Maria Teresa Rigotti Agana; 16 May 1942 (age 83); Manila, Commonwealth of the Philippines
- Occupation: Actress
- Years active: 1950–1969
- Spouse(s): Rodolfo Jao, MD (m. 1964; death 2018)
- Children: 9, including Radmar Jao
- Mother: Linda Estrella
- Website: Official website

Tessie Agana (born May 16, 1942) is a Filipina former child actress of the 1950s. She is best known for playing the title role in the 1951 film Roberta, which was then the highest grossing Philippine film of all time. Agana was known as the "Shirley Temple of the Philippines". Her mother was the actress Linda Estrella.

On July 26, 1956, Agana moved to the United States with her mother and father. She enrolled as a sophomore at Maryvale Preparatory School in Lutherville, Maryland. A year later, the Agana family moved to Lafayette, Indiana, and Tessie attended Lafayette Central Catholic Jr/Sr High School. She graduated in 1959.

== Filmography ==
- 1950 – 13 Hakbang
- 1950 – Kay Ganda Mo Neneng
- 1951 – Kasaysayan ni Dr. Ramon Selga
- 1951 – Roberta
- 1951 – Anghel ng Pag-ibig
- 1951 – Ang Prinsesa at ang Pulubi
- 1951 – Batas ng Daigdig
- 1952 – Rebecca
- 1952 – Kerubin
- 1952 – Ulila ng Bataan
- 1953 – Munting Koronel
- 1953 – Anak ng Espada
- 1954 – Nagkita si Kerubin at si Tulisang Pugot
- 1954 – Kung Ako'y Maging Dalaga
- 1954 – ...At sa Wakas
- 1955 – Baril o Araro?
- 1960 – Amy, Susie, Tessie
- 1964 – Eddie Loves Susie
- 1969 – Rikitik Loves Rositik
- 1969 – 9 Teeners

== Awards ==
In 1951, Agana received the Maria Clara Award for Best Child Star for her performance in Ang Prinsesa at ang Pulubi.

In 2006, Agana earned her own star at the Eastwood City Walk of Fame for her overall contribution to Philippine showbusiness.

In 2022, Agana received the Lifetime Achievement Award from the Filipino Academy of Movie Arts and Sciences FAMAS Award.
