= Shirley Moreno =

Filipino actress

- Born: Elizabeth Geloso
- Occupation: Actress
- Years active: 1963–1982
- Spouse: Henry Stevens

Shirley Moreno (born Elizabeth Geloso) is a retired Filipino actress. Raised in Marikina, she was first discovered by Eddie Garcia in 1963, and was later part of Sampaguita Pictures' "Stars '66" lineup of young actors and actresses.

As of 2020, Moreno is living in the United States.

== Filmography ==
Year	Title	Role	Note(s)	Ref(s).
1963	Dance-O-Rama			
1963	Ang Class Reunion			
1963	Esperanza at Caridad			
1963	Tansan vs. Tarsan			
1963	Sa Bawa't Lansangan			
1963	Ako'y Ibigin Mo, Dalagang Matapang			
1964	Mga Batang Iskwater			
1964	Binibiro Lamang Kita			
1964	Mga Batang Bakasyonista			
1964	Kumander Judo		Cameo role	
1964	Mga Batang Milyonaryo			
1964	Anak ni Kamagong			
1964	Mga Batang Artista			
1964	Mga Bata ng Lagim			
1964	Show of Shows			
1965	Pag-ibig, Ikaw ang Maysala			
1965	Gintong Recuerdo		Also known as Apat Na Kagandahan	
1965	Mga Batang Turista			
1965	Mga Espada ng Rubitanya			
1965	Rosalie	Conching		
1965	Bye-Bye Na sa Daddy			
1965	Portrait of My Love	Marily		
1966	Maraming Kulay ang Pag-ibig		"Pag-asa" segment	
1966	I'll Dream of You			
1966	Jamboree '66			
1966	What Now, My Love?			
1966	Till the End of Time			
1966	James Batman			
1966	Ang Lagay 'Adre... Ay Under-istanding			
1967	Bikini Beach Party			
1967	Valentine Wedding			
1967	Ito ang Aking Kasaysayan			
1967	7 Bullets for Gringo			
1967	Love, This Is My Song			
1982	Puppy Love			
