= Teddy Benavídez =

Filipino actor

Teddy Benavídez is a Filipino actor who made his film debut on 1936's Mga Kaluluwang Napaligaw aka Unguided Spirit. His first screen name is Teodoro Benavidez and changed it to Teddy when he first made his movie under Sampaguita Pictures in 1937's Bituing Marikit starring Elsa Oria & Rogelio dela Rosa.

After World War II he made his comeback movie where he is the Philippine version of Tarzan's Tani: Lord of the South Seas under Leyte Motion Pictures.

== Filmography ==
- 1936: Mga Kaluluwang Napaligaw
- 1937: Mga Pusong Dakila
- 1937: Milagro ng Nazareno sa Quiapo
- 1937: Bituing Marikit
- 1938: Inang Mahal
- 1938: Tigre (Ang Taong Halimaw)
- 1938: Paru-Parong Bukid
- 1938: Himagsikan ng Puso
- 1938: Madaling Araw
- 1941: Balatkayo
- 1941: Tarhata
- 1941: Sa Iyong Kandungan
- 1941: Tampuhan
- 1941: Balatkayo
- 1942: Landas na Ginto
- 1947: Tani (Lord of the South Seas)
- 1948: Krus ng Digma
- 1948: Pag-ibig at Patalim
- 1948: Malaya (Mutya sa Gubat)
- 1950: Pedro, Pablo, Juan at Jose
- 1951: Tatlong Birhen
- 1952: Kalbaryo ni Hesus
- 1957: Objective: Patayin si Magsaysay
