= Rebecca Del Rio =

Filipino actress (1929–2010)

Rebecca del Rio
- Del Rio in 1955
- Born: Rebecca Busbus Buslon; January 31, 1929; Sierra Bullones, Bohol, Philippine Islands
- Died: March 11, 2010 (aged 81); Canoga Park, California, U.S.
- Occupation: Actress
- Awards: Asia's Best Actress

Rebecca del Rio (born Rebecca Busbus Buslon-Tushinsky; January 31, 1929 – March 11, 2010), was a Filipino actress who was typecast as a glamorous contravida or villain in Sampaguita Pictures who was the first Filipino to be awarded as Asia’s Best Actress.

She made numerous movies under Sampaguita Pictures. In 1955, she signed a contract with LVN Pictures and made her first movie Dinayang Pagmamahal a.k.a. Foolish Love, a Jaime de la Rosa and Charito Solis movie.

== Personal life ==
Rebecca del Rio was from Sierra Bullones, Bohol, Philippines. She was the daughter of lawyer and former congressman Teofilo Buslon and his wife Demetria Busbus, a nurse and former mayor of Pilar, Bohol. She was also the sister of the late former provincial board member Dr. Socorro Tallo, aunt of fashion designer Maximiel Tallo and grandmother of Miss Bohol 1997 lawyer Socorro Tallo-Inting.

Del Rio graduated from Holy Spirit School of Tagbilaran and went to the Philippine Women's University in Manila to study and was discovered by Sampaguita Pictures.

She was the first Filipino to receive the Best Actress Award in Asia. She personally received the award in Japan. She was also FAMAS’ Best Supporting Actress in 1958.

According to Leo Udtohan, a journalist who wrote an article about Del Rio at The Philippine Star in 2005, at the peak of her career being a premier and classic Sampaguita Star, she left the Philippines after she married a Sony executive and resided in the US.

She later married Joseph Tushinsky.

Del Rio died March 11, 2010, and survived by a son.

== Filmography ==
- 1951 - Tres Muskiteros
- 1952 - Mayamang Balo
- 1952 - Hiram na Mukha
- 1953 - Ang Ating Pag-ibig
- 1953 - Cofradia
- 1953 - Anak ng Espada
- 1953 - Mister Kasintahan
- 1953 - Vod-A-Vil
- 1954 - Musikong Bumbong
- 1954 - Tres Muskiteras
- 1954 - Pilya
- 1954 - Milyonarya at Hampaslupa
- 1954 - Dalagang Ilocana
- 1954 - Sabungera
- 1954 - Bondying
- 1954 - Kurdapya
- 1955 - Lola Sinderella
- 1955 - Bulaklak sa Parang
- 1955 - Mariposa
- 1955 - Dinayang Pagmamahal
- 1955 - Talusaling
- 1956 - Luksang Tagumpay
- 1956 - Laging Ikaw
- 1957 - Cuatro Vidas
- 1957 - Turista
- 1958 - Rebelde
- 1958 - Malvarosa
- 1958 - Mr. Kuripot
- 1968 Pitong Krus ng Isang Ina
- 1971 Lollipops, Roses and Talangka
