= Iginuhit ng Tadhana (The Ferdinand E. Marcos Story) =

1965 biographical film starring Luis Gonzales

- Promotional poster
- Directed by: Mar S. Torres; Jose de Villa; Conrado Conde
- Written by: Luciano B. Carlos; Emmanuel H. Borlaza; Chito B. Tapawan (additional)
- Starring: Luis Gonzales; Rosa Mia; Gloria Romero
- Cinematography: Higino J. Fallorina; Steve Perez; Amaury Agra
- Edited by: Jose Tarnate; Marcelino Navarro
- Music by: Restie Umali
- Production company: 777 Film Productions
- Distributed by: Sampaguita Pictures
- Release date: August 24, 1965
- Country: Philippines
- Language: Tagalog

Iginuhit ng Tadhana (The Ferdinand E. Marcos Story) (lit. 'Drawn by Fate'), also known as Man of Destiny, is a 1965 Philippine biographical historical drama film about then-Senate President Ferdinand Marcos. Directed by Mar S. Torres, Jose de Villa and Conrado Conde, the film stars Luis Gonzales as Marcos, Rosa Mia as Marcos' mother Josefa, and Gloria Romero as Marcos' wife Imelda. The film was produced by 777 Film Productions and was first released by Sampaguita Pictures in the Philippine provinces on August 24, 1965, during Marcos' campaign for president in the 1965 presidential election.

The theatrical run of Iginuhit ng Tadhana was briefly suspended on September 2, 1965, by the Board of Censors for Motion Pictures due to the film having yet to be screened for the entire committee, though its exhibition was eventually allowed to continue five days later. Its sequel Pinagbuklod ng Langit was released in 1969.

== Cast ==
- Luis Gonzales as Ferdinand E. Marcos
- Rosa Mia as Josefa Edralin Marcos
- Gloria Romero as Imelda Marcos
- Bongbong Marcos as himself
- Vilma Santos as Imee Marcos
- Chona as Irene Marcos
- Tony Cayado
- Ven Medina
- Venchito Galvez
- Jose Morelos
- Marcela Garcia
- Lourdes Yumul
- Matimtiman Cruz
- Renato del Prado
- Pablo Raymundo
- Conrado Conde
- Jose de Villa
- Nenita Navarro
- Sabas San Juan
- Jaime Javier
- Willie Dado
- Jimmy Evangelista
- Mariano Honrado
- Nellie Madrigal
- Rey Tomenes
- Emmanuel Borlaza
- Marcelino Navarro
- Naty Mallares
- Aring Bautista
- Dino Tuazon
- Henry Stevens
- Aurora Ilagan
- Florencio Tarnate
- Abner Villar
- Pio Torres
- Tita de Villa
- Joseph Strait
- Remedios Marcos
- Vic Pacia
- Teddy Valdemor
- Joe Salazar
- Jose Villafranca

== Production ==
Iginuhit ng Tadhana was directed by three men: Mar S. Torres, Jose de Villa and Conrado Conde. Conde handled the first third of the film's story, which covered Marcos' early life and the Julio Nalundasan trial. De Villa handled the middle portion, which covered Marcos' career as a soldier in World War II. Lastly, Torres handled the film's final third, which covered Marcos' post-war political life and marriage to Imelda Romualdez.

== Release ==
Iginuhit ng Tadhana was first released in eight provinces on August 24, 1965, after it was approved for release by a subcommittee of the Board of Censors for Motion Pictures. Its theatrical run, however, was suspended on September 2 by the board, which then required that the film be screened first to the entire committee before it could continue its exhibition; Chairman Jose L. Guevarra resigned immediately from the board due to the suspension being carried out in his absence. On the same day, as a result of the suspension, the film's gala premiere at Rizal Theater in Makati was halted despite the attendance of approximately 400 people, which included Marcos, his wife, his mother, and the film's main cast; the theater decided to screen the American film The Thin Red Line instead to compensate for the cancellation. By September 7, the film's suspension was lifted after a local court in Manila issued a writ of preliminary injunction to the board which ordered that it halt the suspension.

After the election of Ferdinand Marcos to the presidency, the film was screened as Man of Destiny at the 13th Asian Film Festival held in Seoul, South Korea in early May 1966, where it received a special award "for portraying the life of an outstanding Asian leader." It was also later re-released in the Philippines on June 18 for the 1st Manila Film Festival.

In later decades, it has been claimed that people who were close to President Diosdado Macapagal, then running for re-election against Marcos, were behind the film's initial suspension.

=== Home media ===
In September 2022, the film has been made available on YouTube for streaming without charge by the Philippine News Agency.

== Reception ==
=== Historical portrayal ===
The film remains controversial due to the dramatization of Marcos's wartime records and how it significantly contributed in shaping the myth around Marcos. The United States military archives have consistently revealed a lack of foundation for Marcos' claims of engaging in guerilla activities or leading a guerrilla force called Ang Mga Maharlika in military operations against Japanese forces from 1942 to 1944.

Moreover, a recent study conducted by the National Historical Commission of the Philippines reveals that official wartime documents and literature on Bataan do not reference Ferdinand's accomplishments and his reception of three US medals.
