= Juvy Cachola =

Filipino actress

- Occupation: Actress

Juvy Cachola, born Juvy Esteban Cachola, was an actress for the Philippines' Sampaguita Pictures. She was one of the film company's brightest stars in the 1960s. She was the sister of Jean Altavas, a former Mutya ng Pilipinas candidate and aunt to New Zealand actress Janna Cachola-Bird. Her film career flourished throughout the Swinging Sixties and sometime in the early 1970s. Her first movie titled ‘Beetnik’ was released six years before the group "Stars of 1966" was formed. By then, she was already a household name. Her last movie was "Leon Dimasupil" in 1973. She was only in her late twenties when she died due to fatal head injuries caused by a car accident in Cavite in 1977.

== Filmography ==
=== Movies ===
Year	Title
1973	Leon Dimasupil
1970	Gintong Alala
1970	Nobody's Child
1968	"7 bullets for Gringo"
1968	Dobol Wedding
1967	Lets do the Psychedlic '68
1967	Oh! What a kiss
1967	Sitting in the park
1966	Sa bawa't langsangan
1964	Pitong Desperada
1964	Mga batang iskwater
1963	Ang class reunion
1963	Dance-o-rama
1963	Mga kwela sa eskwela
1963	Prinsipeng Tulisan
1963	Scream for Detektib Kalog
1962	Amaliang Mali-Mali
1962	Hampaslupang Anghel
1962	Lucio at Miguel
1962	Kaming mga talyada
1962	Tugtugin bukid
1960	Beatnik
