= Eddie Arenas =

Filipino actor (1935–2003)

- Born: Eduardo Cuadrado; July 7, 1935; Philippine Islands
- Died: March 31, 2003 (aged 67); Philippines
- Occupation: Actor
- Years active: 1953–2003
- Spouse: Lolita Rodriguez (divorced)
- Children: 3

Eddie Arenas (July 7, 1935 – March 31, 2003) was a Filipino actor. He made numerous films for the film studio Sampaguita Pictures. He was often paired with Lolita Rodriguez, whom he married and later divorced. He eventually moved to the United States and acted only sporadically in Filipino productions. Arenas' last appearance in a film was in 2003 in the movie Lupe: A Seaman's Wife.

== Filmography ==
Year	Title
1953	Diwani
1955	Hindi Basta-Basta
1955	Iyung-Iyo
1955	Waldas
1955	Balisong
1955	Bulaklak sa Parang
1955	Artista
1955	Lola Sinderella
1955	Ang Tangi kong Pag-ibig
1956	Kulang sa 7
1956	Gilda
1956	Kontra-Partido
1956	Teresa
1956	Senyorita de Kampanilya
1956	Prince Charming
1957	Busabos
1958	Tatang Edyer
1958	Kundiman ng Puso
1959	Tanikalang Apoy
2002	Mahal Kita, Final Answer
2002	D'Uragons
2003	Lupe: A Seaman's Wife
