= Conrado Conde =

Filipino actor and film director

- Born: 1911
- Occupations: Actor; Film director

Conrado Conde (born 1911) was a Filipino film director and actor.

He made his first acting appearance as a bit player in Parlatone Hispano-Filipino Carmelita, a Roy de Silva movie and in the 1941 musical Panambitan.

His last film from LVN Pictures is Prinsipe Teñoso ("Prince Tenoso", 1942), a swashbuckling movie with Leopoldo Salcedo where he directed his debut.

After outbreak of World War II, he returned to LVN to direct the movie Dalawang Daigdig (Two Worlds).

His first appearance in Premiere Productions was Ang Hiwaga ng Tulay na Bato (The Mystery of the Stoned-Bridge).

In 1953, he signed a contract to Sampaguita Pictures and spent his career for almost 3 decades.

He is one of the director (the other were Jose De Villa and Mar S. Torres) for a propaganda film commissioned by then-Senate President Ferdinand Marcos, depicting his life and intended to support his upcoming electoral campaign against the incumbent President Diosdado Macapagal. The film was produced by Sampaguita Pictures and was scheduled for release a few weeks before the elections.

== Filmography ==
=== As actor ===
- Carmelita (1938)
- Panambitan (1941)
- Prinsipe Teñoso (1942)
- Dalawang Daigdig (1946)
- Tayug (Ang Bayang Api) (1947)
- Padre Burgos (1949)
- Ang Lumang Bahay sa Gulod (1949)
- Ang Hiwaga ng Tulay na Bato (1950)
- Wanted: Patay O Buhay (1950)
- 48 Oras (1950)
- Doble-Cara (1950)
- Tigang Na Lupa (1950)
- Kamay ni Satanas (1950)
- Sigfredo (1951)
- Bahay na Tisa (1951)
- El indio (1953)
- 4 na Taga (1953)
- May Isang Tsuper ng Taxi (1953)
- Maldita (1953)
- Reyna Bandida (1953)
- Matandang Dalaga (1954)
- Ukala (Ang Walang Suko) (1954)
- Waldas (1955)
- Prince Charming (1956)
- Katawang Lupa (1956)
- From Tokyo with Love (1964)
- Iginuhit ng Tadhana: The Ferdinand E. Marcos Story (1965)
- Sino ang Dapat Sisihin? (1967)
- Kamay na Gumagapang (1974)
- Target... Eva Jones (1974)

=== As director ===
- Balisong (1955)
- Via Dolorosa (1956)
- Katawang-Lupa (1956)
- Mga Anak ng Diyos (with Mar S. Torres and Armando Garces, 1957)
- Diyosa (1957)
- Batang Bangkusay (1957)
- Taga sa Bato (1957)
- Anino ni Bathala (1958)
- Talipandas (1958)
- Mga Kuwento ni Lola Basyang (1958)
- Rosa Rossini (1959)
- Pakiusap (1959)
- Double Cross (1960)
- Berdugo (1960)
- Gumuhong Bantayog (1960)
- 7 Amores ("Visayan Story" segment, 1960)
- Harangan Man ng Sibat (1961)
- Halik sa Lupa (1961)
- Nagbalik Na Kahapon (1962)
- Sweet Valentines (one segment, 1963)
- Haliging Bato (1963)
- Anak ni Kamagong (1964)
- From Tokyo with Love (1964)
- Umibig Ay Di Biro (one segment, 1964)
- Gintong Recuerdo (1965)
- Mga Espada ng Rubitanya (1965)
- Iginuhit ng Tadhana: The Ferdinand E. Marcos Story (with Mar S. Torres and José de Villa, 1965)
- Alis D'yan! H'wag Mo 'Kong Ligawan (1965)
- 'Tsura Lang! (1966)
- Maraming Kulay ng Pag-ibig ("Pagpapakasakit" segment, 1966)
- Laman ng Aking Laman (1966)
- Hanggang Doon Kay Bathala (1966)
- Bikini Beach Party (1967)
- Oh! What a Kiss (1967)
- All Over the World (1967)
- Cinderella A-Go-Go (with Mar S. Torres, 1967)
- Sandwich Shindig (1968)
- Brownout ("Ang Kasal" segment, 1969)
- Inagawan Ako ng Aking Ama! (1970)

=== As screenwriter ===
- Mga Anak ng Diyos (with Mar S. Torres, Luciano B. Carlos, Armando Garces, and Herman Torres, 1957)
- Batang Bangkusay (with Bert Mendoza, 1957)
- Taga sa Bato (1957)
- Anino ni Bathala (1958)
- Talipandas (with Ding de Jesus, 1958)
- Mga Kuwento ni Lola Basyang (with Chito Tapawan and Tommy David, 1958)
- Pakiusap (1959)
- Gumuhong Bantayog (1960)
- Harangan Man ng Sibat (1961)
- I Miss You So (Hinahanap-hanap Kita) (1965)
- Brownout (1969)

=== As composer ===
- Pipit-Puso (1948)
