= Matimtiman Cruz =

Filipina radio personality, actress and comedian

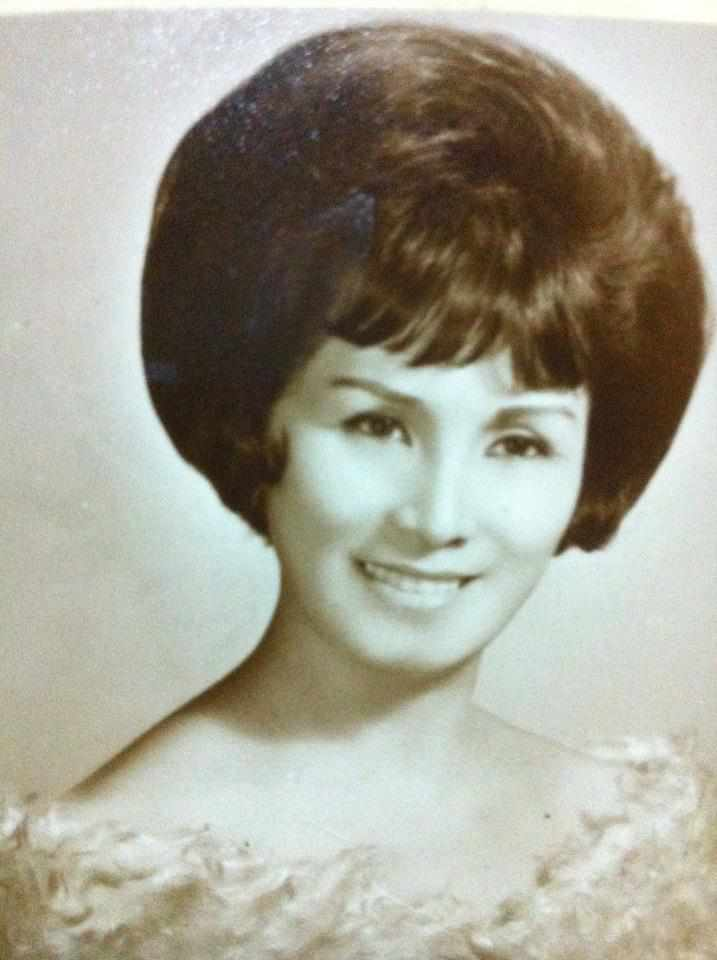
- Cruz in 1950
- Born: Maria Josefa Cruz; August 21, 1921; Batangas, Philippine Islands
- Died: April 14, 1992 (aged 70); Philippine Heart Center, Quezon City, Philippines
- Resting place: Loyola Memorial Cemetery, Marikina
- Other names: Aling Epang
- Citizenship: Filipino
- Occupations: Actress, comedian, radio personality
- Years active: 1955–1987
- Employer: Sampaguita Picture
- Spouse: Perfecto Ursua Manego Sr.
- Partner(s): Jaime Llave, popularly known as Balot
- Children: Veronidia, Angelito, Perfecto "Jun", Wilfredo
- Awards: 1969 FAMAS nominee for Best Supporting Actress for "IKAW"

Maria Josefa Cruz (August 21, 1921 – April 14, 1992), better known by her screen name Matimtiman Cruz, was a Filipina radio personality, actress and comedian.

== Career ==
Matimtiman started her movie career with Sampaguita Pictures. She later switched to comedy becoming one of the favorite and highly paid comedian in the 1950s. She was featured in 96 films from 1955 to 1988, mostly performing comedic roles.

== Personal life ==
She was married to Perfecto Ursua Manego, writer/director - in DZRH, DZPI and channel 11 (died December 1968), wherein they had 4 children - Veronidia, Angelito, Perfecto "Jun Cruz", and Wilfredo "Willy Cruz".

Her longtime partner, Jaime Llave, an actor-comedian who was best known by his screen name Balot - stood as the father of her children.

== Awards ==
Before she joined the movies, Matimtiman was voted as Miss Batangas in 1937 as well as Bb. Ilang-ilang ng Silangan (Miss Ilang-ilang of the East).

As an actress, Matimtiman was nominated for Best Supporting Actress at the 1970 FAMAS Awards, then the only film awards in the Philippines, for the 1969 movie "Kapatid Ko Ang Aking Ina".

== Death ==
Matimtiman died on April 14, 1992, at the Philippine Heart Center in Quezon City, Metro Manila, Philippines, at the age of 70.

== Filmography ==
An incomplete list of movies Matimtiman Cruz appeared in:

Year	Film
1988	Stupid Cupid
1987	Bata-batuta
1987	Di bale na lang
1985	Mga paru-parong buking
1985	Nagalit ang patay sa haba ng lamay
1982	Palengke Queen
1981	Stariray
1981	Tacio
1980	Dolphy's Angels
1980	'Eto na naman si Asiong Aksaya!
1980	Nognog
1980	Pinoy Boxer
1979	Awat na, Asiong Aksaya!
1979	Stepsisters
1978	Butsoy
1978	Gorgonya
1977	Jack and Poy
1977	Asiong Aksaya
1974	Kamay na gumagapang
1974	Oh Margie Oh
1974	Somewhere Over the Rainbow
1973	Carmela
1973	Florinda
1973	Kondesang basahan
1973	Maalaala mo kaya?
1972	And God Smiled at Me
1972	Ang gangster at ang birhen
1972	Anghel ng pag-ibig
1972	Just Married, Do Not Disturb
1972	Kung may gusot, may lusot
1972	Pinokyo en Little Snow White
1972	The Sisters
1972	Winter Holiday
1971	Batuta ni Drakula
1971	Bulilit Cinderella
1971	Liezl at ang 7 hoods
1971	Madonna
1971	Portrait of an Angel
1971	Querida mia
1971	Sweet Caroline
1971	Twinkle, Twinkle Little Star
1970	Bakit ako pa?
1970	For You, Mama
1970	Nasaan ka, Inay?
1970	Ricky na, Tirso pa!
1970	Sweet Matutinna
1969	9 Teeners
1969	Bittersweet
1969	Drakulita
1969	Jinkee
1969	Kapatid ko ang aking ina
1969	Let's Dance the Horsey-Horse
1968	Bahay kubo, kahit munti
1968	Deborrah
1968	Elizabeth
1968	Pitong krus ng isang ina
1967	Cinderella A-Go-Go
1967	Way Out in the Country
1967	All Over the World
1967	Dahil sa Isang Bulaklak
1967	Pogi
1966	Miranda: Ang Lagalag na Sirena
1966	Jamboree '66
1966	Viva Ranchera
1965	Iginuhit ng Tadhana (The Ferdinand E. Marcos Story)
1965	Apat Na Kagandahan
1965	Gintong Recuerdo
1965	Hamon sa Kampeon
1965	Lastikman
1965	Portrait of My Love
1964	Hi-sosayti
1964	Sa bilis, walang kaparis
1964	Pag-ibig, ikaw ang maysala
1964	From Tokyo with Love
1964	Mga bata ng lagim
1964	Umibig ay di biro
1963	Ang bukas ay akin!
1963	Trudis liit
1963	Sabina
1962	Lab na lab kita
1962	Tulisan
1962	Amaliang Mali-Mali
1962	Susanang daldal
1961	Tindahan ni Aling Epang
1961	Dayukdok
1961	Octavia
1960	Lupa sa lupa
1959	Tanikalang apoy
1958	Baby bubut
1958	Tatlong ilaw sa dambana
1958	Anino ni Bathala
1958	Talipandas
1957	Ate Barbara
1957	Batang bangkusay
1957	Diyosa
1955	Batas ng alipin
