= Daisy Romualdez =

Filipino actress

- Born: Margarita Gómez
- Occupation: Actress
- Spouse: Manny Paner
- Relatives: Danita Paner (adopted daughter); Kristina Paner (adopted daughter); Karl Paner (adopted son)

Daisy Romualdez (born Margarita Gómez) is a Hispanofilipino actress and producer. She is sister of Blanca Gómez. She is married to well known former basketball player Manny Paner. She has two adopted daughters, Danita Paner, now a rock diva, Kristina Paner and son Karl Paner.

== Filmography ==
=== Film ===
- Lupang Kayumanggi (1955)
- Vacacionista (1956)
- Chabacano (1956)
- Mga Ligaw Na Bulaklak (1957)
- Hong Kong Holiday (1957)
- Bituing Marikit (1957)
- Ulilang Angel (1958)
- Tatlong Ilaw sa Dambana (1958)
- Silveria (1958)
- Pakiusap (1959)
- Salamat Po Doktor (1960)
- Sa Bawat Punglo (1962)
- Kaming Mga Talyada (1962)
- Si Darna at ang Babaeng Impakta (1963)
- Show of Shows (1964)
- Hinango Kita sa Lusak (1967)
- Ngayon Lamang Ako Dumalangin (1968)
- Karate Fighters (1968)
- The Blackbelter (1968)
- Anak ng Aswang (1973)
- Katawang Alabok (1978)
- Shake Rattle & Roll 2 (segment "Kulam", 1990) – Dra. Kalbaryo
