= Tres Muskiteros =

- Produced by: Sampaguita Pictures
- Starring: Oscar Moreno; Fred Montilla; César Ramírez; Teresita Martinez; Norma Vales; Myrna Delgado; Rebecca del Rio; Gloria Romero; Carmencita Abad
- Release date: 1951
- Country: Philippines

Tres Muskiteros is a 1951 Filipino film produced by Sampaguita Pictures.

== Cast ==
- Oscar Moreno
- Fred Montilla
- César Ramírez
- Teresita Martinez
- Norma Vales
- Myrna Delgado
- Rebecca del Rio
- Gloria Romero
- Carmencita Abad
