= Roberta (1951 film) =

Filipino drama film

- Directed by: Olive La Torre
- Based on: Roberta by Mars Ravelo
- Starring: Tessie Agana; Van de Leon; Bella Flores; Maria Cristina; Rosa Mia; José de Villa; Aruray; Boy Alano; Tony Cayado
- Cinematography: Higino J. Fallorina
- Production company: Sampaguita Pictures
- Release date: March 1951
- Country: Philippines
- Language: Tagalog
- Budget: ₱40,000
- Box office: ₱120,000

Roberta is a 1951 Filipino drama film based on the Tagalog Klasiks character of the same name by Mars Ravelo. Directed by Olive La Torre, it stars child actress Tessie Agana as the titular character, alongside Van de Leon, Bella Flores, Maria Cristina, Rosa Mia, José de Villa, Aruray, Boy Alano and Tony Cayado. Produced by Sampaguita Pictures on a low budget after a fire destroyed the studio's film library, it was released in 1951, and was an unprecedented box office success. It won two Maria Clara Awards, for Best Supporting Actress (Mia) and Best Cinematography (Higino Fallorina), and has since been credited with propelling the studio's revival in the early 1950s. It is touted as the first-ever blockbuster film of the Philippines.

== Cast ==
- Tessie Agana as Roberta
- Van de Leon as Roberta's father
- Bella Flores as a bar girl
- Maria Cristina
- Rosa Mia
- José de Villa
- Aruray
- Boy Alano
- Tony Cayado
- Candida Valderrama
- Pablo Raymundo
- Ric Flores
- Pablo Naval
- Helen Miraflor
- Batotoy
- Anchita Cajes Reyes as Mean Restaurant Lady

== Release ==
Released in theaters in 1951, Roberta achieved unprecedented box office success, becoming the highest-grossing Philippine film of all time and holding the record for nearly ten years. It has been credited with reviving Sampaguita Pictures which at the time was attempting to recover from low finances after a fire destroyed thousands of film reels stored in its library.

A remake was planned in 1990, with Ice Seguerra as Roberta and Bibeth Orteza as screenwriter, though it did not come to fruition.

== Accolades ==
Rosa Mia and Higino J. Fallorina won the Maria Clara Awards for Best Supporting Actress and Best Cinematography respectively.
