= Panchito =

Panchito is a diminutive of the name Pancho, which in turn is a diminutive of the name Francisco. It may refer to:

- Panchito Alba, stage name of Filipino actor Alfonso Tagle Sr.
- Panchito Pistoles, Disney cartoon character
- Francisco Velázquez, former Argentine roller hockey player
- A Spanish profane term for a Mestizo or an indigenous Central or South American
