= José de Villa =

Filipino actor (died 1997)

- Born: c. 1922; Philippine Islands
- Died: July 25, 1997 (aged 75)
- Occupation(s): Actor, Film director
- Years active: 1947–1984
- Spouse: Tita de Villa

Manuel Gozon Martin (c. 1922 – July 25, 1997), professionally known as José de Villa, was a Filipino film actor and director.

== Career ==
José De Villa made his first film for Sampaguita Pictures in 1947, Maria Kapra, which starred Ángel Esmeralda. He was married to Sampaguita's character actor and contravida (villain) of the 1960s, Tita de Villa.

De Villa made two films under LVN Pictures in 1949, a biopic of Gregorio del Pilar starring Jose Padilla Jr. and Capas, starring Leopoldo Salcedo.

After these two films, he returned to his original studio, Sampaguita Pictures, where he acted, played character roles and directed films.

== Personal life and death ==
José De Villa was married to actress Tita de Villa, with whom he had nine children. He died on July 25, 1997, at the age of 75.

== Filmography ==
=== As an actor ===
- 1947 Maria Kapra
- 1947 Back Pay with (Rogelio De la Rosa and Corazon Noble)
- 1949 Capas
- 1949 Hen. Gregorio del Pilar
- 1950 13 Hakbang
- 1950 Kapitan Cristina ng Candaba with (Tessie Quintana and Teody Belarmino)
- 1951 Kasaysayan ni Dr. Ramon Selga
- 1951 Anghel ng Pag-ibig
- 1951 Batas ng Daigdig
- 1952 Barbaro
- 1952 Roberta
- 1952 Madam X
- 1952 Lihim ng Kumpisalan
- 1952 Kerubin
- 1952 Get Maddick
- 1952 Kasaysayan ni Rudy Concepcion
- 1953 Anak ng Espada
- 1953 Tulisang Pugot
- 1953 Vod-A-Vil
- 1954 Tres Muskiteras
- 1954 Pilya
- 1954 Nagkita si Kerubin at si Tulisang Pugot
- 1954 Sabungera
- 1954 Tres Ojos
- 1954 Quadro Dongs
- 1954 Bondying
- 1954 Dumagit
- 1955 Tatay Na si Bondying
- 1955 Jack and Jill
- 1955 Mariposa
- 1955 Rosanna
- 1965 Iginuhit ng Tadhana (The Ferdinand E. Marcos Story)

=== As director ===
- 1955 Iyung-Iyo
- 1956 Senyorita de Kampanilya
- 1956 Pampanggenya
- 1957 Ismol Ba't Teribol
- 1957 Sino ang Maysala
- 1957 Pretty Boy
- 1957 Busabos
- 1958 Tatlong Ilaw sa Dambana
- 1958 Ulilang Anghel
- 1964 Sa Bilis Walang Kaparis
- 1964 Mga kanyon ng Corregidor
- 1965 Iginuhit ng Tadhana (The Ferdinand E. Marcos Story)
- 1968 Sayonara My Darling
- 1972 Winter Holiday
