= Aring Bautista =

Filipino actress

Aring Bautista (born 1920) was the stage name of a Filipino actress. Her real name was Aurea Navales. Bautista made her whole career doing movies under her film studio Sampaguita Pictures, and was the mother-in-law of Francisco Coching.

== Filmography ==
- 1951 - Batas ng Daigdig
- 1952 - Madam X
- 1952 - Mayamang Balo
- 1952 - Kasaysayan ni Roy Marcial
- 1953 - Cofradia (film)
- 1953 - Diwani
- 1953 - Maldita
- 1953 - Recuerdo
- 1954 - Sabungera
- 1954 - MN
- 1954 - Luha ng Birhen
- 1954 - Dumagit
- 1955 - Bulaklak sa Parang
- 1956 - Prince Charming
- 1956 - Teresa
- 1957 - Hongkong Holiday
- 1957 - Pretty Boy
- 1957 - Gabi at Araw
- 1957 - Veronica
- 1958 - Anino ni Bathala
- 1958 - Tatlong Ilaw sa Dambana
- 1958 - Tawag ng Tanghalan
