= Nori Dalisay =

Filipino actress

- Born: 1938
- Occupation: Actress
- Years active: 1956–1969

Honorata S. Dalisay (born 1938), professionally known as Nori Dalisay, is a retired Filipina actress who played mostly supporting roles. She made dozens of films under her home studio Sampaguita Pictures.

Dalisay's first film was Chavacano, which was top billed by Dolphy.

== Filmography ==
- 1956 – Chavacano
- 1956 – Rodora
- 1956 – Pampanggenya
- 1957 – Ismol Ba't Teribol
- 1957 – Hahabul-Habol
- 1957 – Mga Ligaw Na Bulaklak
- 1957 – Baby Bubut
- 1958 – Kundiman ng Puso
- 1959 – Baby Face
- 1960 – Beatnik
- 1960 – Gumuhong Bantayog
- 1960 – Bilanggong Birhen
- 1961 – Eca Babagot
- 1962 – Susanang Daldal
- 1962 – Magbayad ang May-utang
- 1962 – Kaming Mga Talyada
- 1963 – Mga Kwela sa Eskwela
- 1963 – Sinisinta Kita (Akala Mo Yata Ako'y Nagbibiro)
- 1964 – Mga Batang Iskwater
- 1964 – Sa Bilis Walang Kaparis
- 1964 – Mga Batang Milyonaryo
- 1964 – Mga Batang Artista
- 1964 – Mga Bata ng Lagim
- 1964 – Show of Shows
- 1965 – Magic Bilao
- 1965 – Portrait of My Love
- 1966 – Huling-huli si Kumpare ni Kumare
- 1966 – Maghapong Walang Araw
- 1966 – James Batman
- 1967 – Pogi
- 1968 – Ikaw Ay Akin, Ako Ay sa Iyo
- 1968 – Dalawang Mukha ng Anghel
- 1968 – Bahay Kubo, Kahit Munti
- 1969 – Yeye Generation
