= Rosa Mia =

Filipino actress

- Born: Rosita Quinto Stecza; 1925
- Died: November 28, 2006 (aged 81)
- Other name: Ka Oncha
- Occupations: Actress and Film director
- Years active: 1946–1980

Rosita Quinto Stecza (1925 – November 28, 2006), known by her screen name Rosa Mia, was a Filipino actress and film director. She died on November 28, 2006, at the age of 81 due to cardiac arrest.

== Filmography ==
=== Actress ===
Year	Title	Role
1946	Dugo at Bayan (I Remember Bataan)	
1947	Sarrungbanggi	
1947	Hagibis	
1948	Sumpaan	
1949	Abogada	
1951	Huling Patak ng Dugo	
1951	Batas ng Daigdig	
1951	Roberta	
1952	Rebecca	
1953	Recuerdo	
1953	Inspirasiyon	
1953	Kiko	
1954	Maalaala Mo Kaya	
1954	Anak sa Panalangin	
1954	Sabungera	
1954	Menor de edad	
1955	Waldas	
1955	Despatsadora	
1955	Ang Tangi Kong Pag-ibig	
1955	Mariposa	
1955	Rosana	
1955	Binibining kalog	
1956	Tumbando caña	Desta
1956	Gilda	
1956	Inang Mahal	
1957	Sino ang Maysala	
1957	Pretty Boy	
1957	Pasang Krus	
1958	Ulilang Angel	
1958	Mga Reyna ng Vicks	Doña Eloisa
1958	Ako ang Maysala!	
1958	Tatlong Ilaw sa Dambana	
1959	Ikaw ang Aking Buhay	
1959	Angel sa Lansangan	
1959	Tatak	
1959	Kamandag	
1960	Salamat Po Doktor	
1960	Ipagdarasal Kita	
1960	28 de Mayo	
1960	Ang Magkakapitbahay	
1961	Operatang Sampay Bakod	
1961	Batas ng Lipunan	
1962	Pitong Kalbaryo ni Inang	
1962	No Man Is an Island	Primera Quintagua
1963	Historia de un amor	
1963	Apat ang Anak ni David	
1963	Ang Manananggol ni Ruben	
1963	Anak, ang Iyong Ina!	
1964	Fighting Warays sa Ilokos	
1964	Ang Rosaryo at ang Tabak	
1964	Magkakapatid Na Waray	
1965	Ana-Roberta	
1965	Iginuhit ng Tadhana (The Ferdinand E. Marcos Story)	Josefa Edralin Marcos
1966	Sa Bawa't Lansangan	
1966	Mama!	
1966	Kapag Langit ang Umusig	
1966	Bakit Pa Ako Isinilang?	
1967	Love and Devotion	
1967	Ang Langit Ay para sa Lahat	
1968	Siete Dolores	
1968	Manila, Open City	
1968	Liku-likong Landas	
1968	Junior Cursillo	
1968	Dobol Wedding	
1968	Ang Mamatay ng Dahil sa Iyo	
1969	Heaven's Fate	Nana Sepa
1970	Bakit Ako Pa?	
1970	First Kiss	
1970	Mother Song	
1971	Huwad	
1971	I'm Eighteen	
1973	Pepeng Agimat	
1973	Kondesang Basahan	
1973	Hulihin si... Tiagong Akyat (Santiago Ronquillo)	
1973	Hindi Kita Malimot	
1973	Hanggang sa Kabila ng Daigdig: The Tony Maiquez Story	
1975	Sa Kagubatan ng Lunsod	
1980	Tatlong Patak ng Dugo ni Adan	
1980	Pinay, American Style	
1987	Maharlika	

=== Director ===
Year	Title
1956	Rodora
1957	Torkwata
1958	Baby Bubut
1959	Debutante
1961	Octavia
1963	Ang Class Reunion
1964	Umibig Ay Di Biro
1964	Leron Leron Sinta
1968	Summer Love
