= Etang Discher =

Filipina actress (1906–1991)

- Born: Enriqueta Discher Grau; November 24, 1906; Manila, Insular Government of the Philippine Islands
- Died: November 22, 1991 (aged 84); Manila, Philippines
- Occupations: Comedienne actress
- Years active: 1939–1981
- Children: Panchito Alba
- Awards: FAMAS Best Supporting Actress; 1955 Lupang Kayumanggi

Enriqueta "Etang" Discher Grau (November 24, 1906 – November 22, 1991) was a Filipino character film actress frequently cast in villainous roles. Her stern, gaunt Castilian face loomed in many post-war Filipino films, especially soap opera-type dramas. She was the woman Filipino movie audiences loved to hate, often playing a villainous aunt, mother-in-law or even a witch. While her roles were hardly predisposed to have made her a star, she nonetheless was one of the more famous (or infamous) and durable stars of Filipino films. Many of her films were produced by Sampaguita Pictures, the studio under which she was under contract for a significant part of her career.

Discher was born to a German father, Leo Discher Sr. and a Filipino mother, Pacencia Discher. She had a sister named Elena Discher. Her extended family resides on the West Coast of the United States in Washington state and California. She began her career in show business as a chorus girl in the bodabil stage shows of Katy de la Cruz.

Her last known film was Karma in 1981.

Her son, Panchito, became a famous film comedian in his own right, usually cast as the comedic foil to Dolphy.

== Filmography ==
Year	Title
1939	Anak ng Hinagpis
1946	Alaala Kita
1951	Reyna Elena
1951	Bohemyo
1951	Ang Aking Kahapon
1951	Haring Cobra
1952	Rebecca
1952	Tia Loleng
1952	Bakas ng Kahapon
1953	Dyesebel
1954	Musikong Bumbong
1954	Matandang Dalaga
1954	Jack & Jill
1954	Eskandalosa
1954	Ang Biyenang Hindi Tumatawa
1954	Tres Ojos
1954	Kurdapya
1955	Uhaw sa Pag-ibig
1955	Mariposa
1955	Despatsadora
1955	Kontra Bida
1955	Iyung-Iyo
1955	Bim Bam Bum
1956	Vaccacionista
1956	Kanto Girl
1957	Sino ang Maysala
1957	Bituing Marikit
1957	Diyosa
1957	Hahabul-Habol
1957	Busabos
1957	Paru-Parong Bukid
1958	Mga Reyna ng Vicks
1958	Isang Milyong Kasalanan
1958	Palaboy
1958	Mapait na Lihim
1958	Baby Bubut
1958	Berdaderong Ginto
1958	Bobby
1970	Wanted: Perfect Mother

== In popular culture ==
- She was played by Lauren King on GMA Network's 2024 war drama series Pulang Araw.
