= Nicanor Abelardo =

Filipino composer (1893–1934)

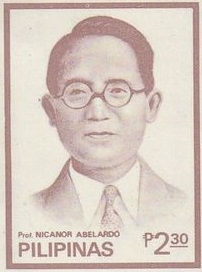
- Nicanor Abelardo depicted on a postage stamp

Background information
- Born: February 7, 1893; San Miguel de Mayumo, Bulacan, Captaincy General of the Philippines
- Died: March 21, 1934 (aged 41) Intramuros, Manila, Philippine Islands
- Genres: Kundiman; classical music
- Occupation: Composer

Nicanor Santa Ana Abelardo (February 7, 1893 – March 21, 1934) was a Filipino composer known for his kundiman songs.

== Biography ==
=== Early life ===
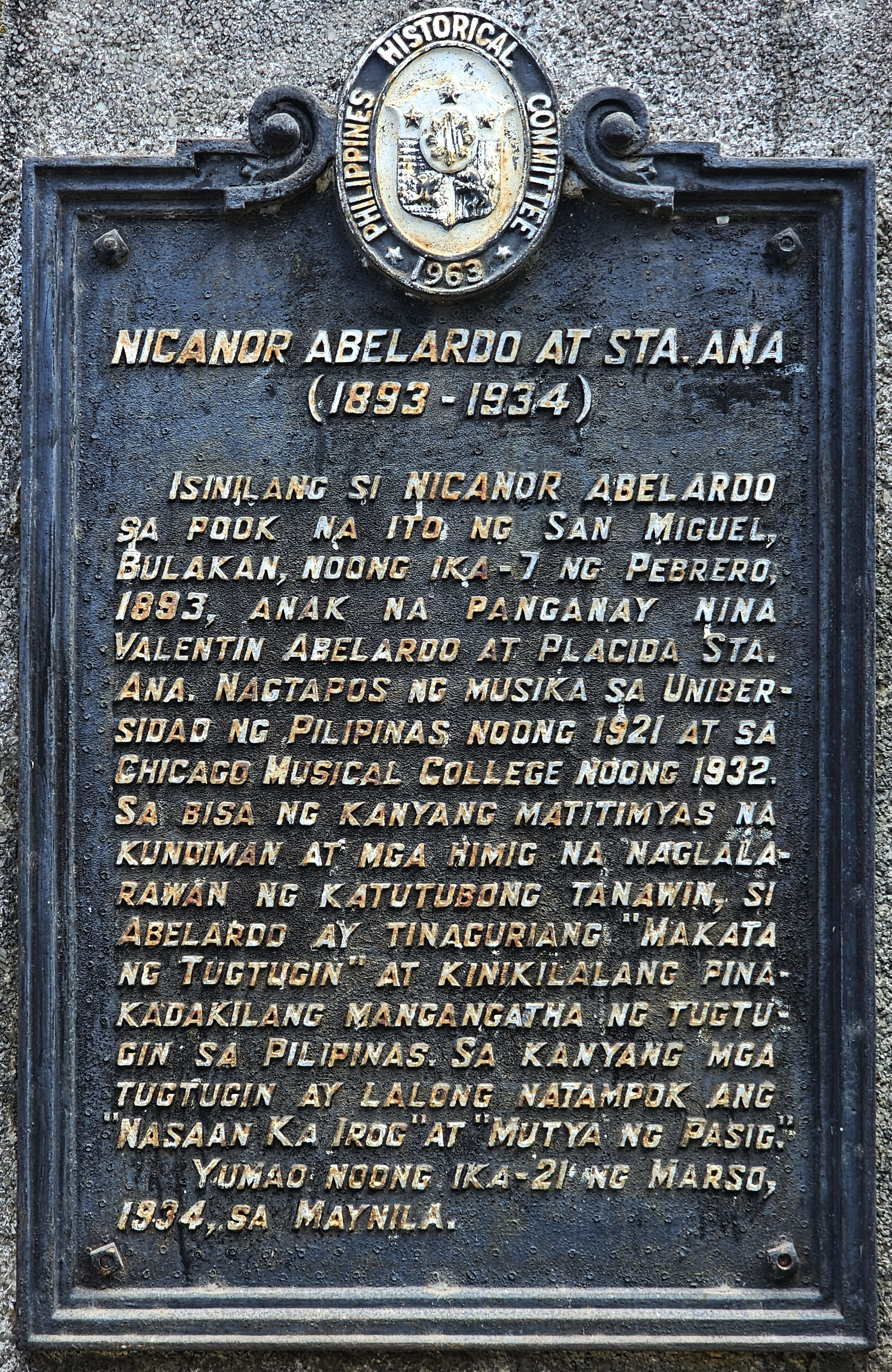
National historical marker installed in 1963 in Abelardo's hometown of San Miguel

Nicanor Abelardo was born in San Miguel de Mayumo, Bulacan to Valentin Abelardo and Placida Santa Ana, on February 7, 1893 His mother belonged to a family of artists in Guagua, the Henson. He was introduced to music when he was five years old when his father taught him solfeggio, the bandurria, and the guitar at 6. His quick mastery of the instruments made him a local prodigy. He could play his father's arrangement of Rossini's "William Tell Overture" on the guitar at age 6. He also learned the violin and other string instruments given to him by his father, and learned how to play quickly without much difficulty. In 1901, he wrote his first composition, "Ang Unang Buko", and dedicated it to his grandmother.

In 1902, Nicanor's uncle, the painter Juan Abelardo, took him to Manila to attend several schools. During this time Nicanor became the favorite among the haranistas who admired his skill at such a young age. This was also the time when he learned how to play the piano. He saw a piano for the first time at a factory of one of his uncle's clients, and immediately taught himself how to play it. By the time his uncle's job was finished, he could already play an air on the piano. The household was even more surprised when he started accompanying his cousin's singing on the piano. This led his uncle to enroll him into private voice lessons under Enrico Capozzi, who was so impressed by Nicanor's abilities that he refused to accept any fee whatsoever. The same thing also happened when he started formally studying Bandurria under Jose Silos. By this time he was 13 years old, the famed pianist Francisco Buencamino took note of his skill in playing the piano, and helped him take a job at a saloon as a pianist.

However, in 1907, he returned to his hometown and finished his 6th grade there after which he was teaching music in various barrio schools around town. but after a year he went back to Manila permanently.

=== Time in Manila ===
In 1908 he returned to Manila and took employment in various small theaters and cinemas. He soon climbed up to the bigger and better-class theaters in the city. He eventually became the leader of Cine Majestic Orchestra, an orchestra from a famous cinema. During this time he met Sixta Naguiat at a cinema, who would become his wife in later years.

==== Career ====
In 1916, Abelardo entered the newly-established University of the Philippines Conservatory of Music, taking courses under Guy F. Harrison and Robert Schofield. During his studies, he composed the melody of the university's official anthem, U.P. Naming Mahal in 1917. The Conservatory instantly noticed his musical ability and by 1918, he was appointed assistant instructor in solfeggio and harmony. He took lessons in piano under Jose Estella, violin under Bonifacio Abdon, and voice under Victorino Carrion. He continued conducting cinema orchestras and playing the piano at saloons and cabarets during this time, and this is also the time when he began to drink alcohol. in 1921 he finally received his degree in science and composition, and thereafter took a post-graduate course which he finished the next year. In 1924 he became head of the composition department of the conservatory, and at night taught private music lessons to some prominent families.

He wrote most of his important works while teaching at the conservatory. His graduation piece, a Piano Sonata in G Major, was the first Sonata made by a Filipino composer (Note: Not to be confused with Francisco Santiago's "Sonata Filipina in D♭" written in 1922 which is, according to Molina, the "first sonata written in the Philippines introducing Philippine musical themes") and his post-graduate piece, the Piano Concerto in B♭ minor, was the first concerto made by a Filipino composer. Almost all of his kundiman was written during his time as well.

He asked a leave of one year because "There is a greater demand in my activities which demand my whole personal attention." He resigned his post in 1930 only to be reinstated in the same year. In 1931 he received a grant to pursue advanced musical studies abroad. He accepted the offer despite his little savings, seeing his bright prospects in the future.

==== Alcoholism ====
Abelardo began to drink in the early 1920s, and from that time onward, he did not pass a day without drinking alcohol. In later years, his alcoholism became uncontrollable which affected his life. In one instance in 1923 he directed the Jazz Band at the Manila Hotel with himself at the piano, or he picked such instruments as he pleased. This greatly amused the people, but he did not stay long because he had lost control of his drinking, and became hospitalized for a month because of it. Another instance occurred while he was rehearsing the Santa Ana Cabaret Orchestra; the manager found him in a corner drunk with a bottle of booze at one hand, which led him to be dismissed from the job. However the manager reinstated him, as no one could lead the orchestra as well as him.

=== Studies in Chicago ===
In May 1931 he left Manila for Chicago and enrolled at the Chicago Musical College under Wesley LaViolette. During this time he was influenced by the musical innovations of the Second Viennese School, Hindemith, and other post-romantic composers of Europe. In barely a month he fully absorbed the new musical style he was exposed to, as evident in his Violin Sonata which he had written in 3 weeks after he started studying there. His music became popular in the college and with his Cinderella Overture, he was granted the LaViolette Scholarship award. He received his master's in 1932 and returned to the Philippines.

=== Later years ===
He resumed his teaching at the Conservatory after returning to Manila. While he was in Chicago, his family ran a boarding house near the conservatory to support him. He eventually ran the boarding house himself when he returned. The boarding house was nicknamed "The Little Conservatory" because he would teach the students there at night, among them the composers Lucino Sacramento and the future National Artist Antonino Buenaventura. His final large complete work, Requiem, was written in 1934 in memory of the composer Marcelo Adonay.

=== Death ===
On March 19, 1934, he went to the Philippine General Hospital for a surgical operation. He died on March 21, 1934, because of heart failure due to alcoholic causes. He was buried at the La Loma Cemetery on March 25, 1934 with a Rose Croix Ceremonial. He left behind various sketches of unfinished music, among them a symphony and an opera.

== Legacy ==
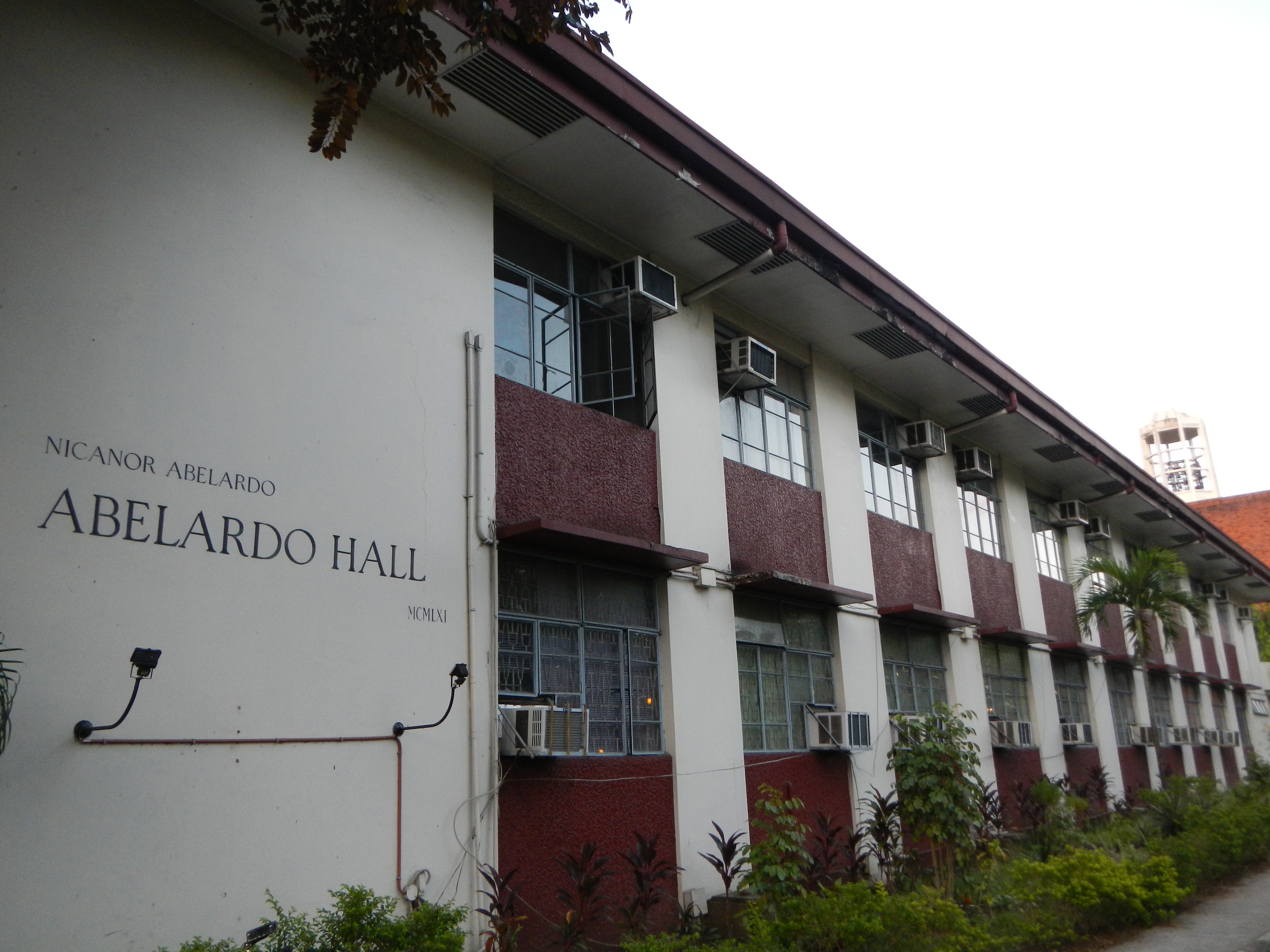
N. Abelardo Hall (UP Diliman)

Abelardo, along with Francisco Santiago, is known for redefining the kundiman, bringing the form to art-song status. Abelardo's kundiman songs, such as "Mutya ng Pasig", "Nasaan ka, Irog?", and "Bituing Marikit" proved to be popular among the Filipino people, and his compositions are regularly played in concerts in the Philippines.

The main theater of the Cultural Center of the Philippines and the building housing the College of Music in UP Diliman (Abelardo Hall) were named in his honor and memory.

== List of works ==
In E. Arsenio Manuel's Biography of Abelardo (1955), Manuel lists 149 works. Some works not included in Manuel's 1955 list is included here. His famous or important works are highlighted below.

Compositions of Nicanor Abelardo
Date	Title	Genre	Opus	Notes	Status
1901	Ang Unang Buko	Waltz, Bandurria solo		Dedicated to his Grandmother Macaria Libunao	Lost
1905	Filipino Boy	Two-step			
1909	Baanag at Lakas	Band, March		Dedicated to the Confederacion Bulakeña	Published
1911	Lucila	Sarswela		In 3 parts. libretto by Florentino Ballecer.	
1913	Akibat	Sarswela		In 1 Act. libretto by Florentino Ballecer.	Libretto only
1915 July 2	Sa Bubungan	Play		In 1 act. unknown librettist	
1915	Dalawang Pag-asa	Play		In 1 act. libretto by Florentino Ballecer	
1916/1917	Amorosa	Vocal, Foxtrot		Spanish Lyrics by Jesus Balmori	Published
1917	U.P. Beloved	Vocal		Winner of the University Hymn competition. English Lyrics by Teogenes Velez	Published
1918 April 28	Kapabayaan/Bunga ng Masamang Hilig	Sarswela		In 1 act. Tagalog Text by Felix Auxilio Roxas	
1918 April 28	Kawanggawa	Sarswela		In 1 act. Tagalog Text by Felix Auxilio Roxas	
1920	Kung Hindi Man	Vocal, Kundiman		Tagalog Lyrics by the composer, English Translation by Atilano Montesa	Published
1921	Academic Overture	Piano, Orchestral		Originally for 2 pianos, later arranged by Antonino Buenaventura for orchestra.	Ms.
1921	An Old Love Song	Vocal		Adopted from Dowland's Songbook	
1921	String Quartet in F Major	Chamber	1, no. 1	for String Quartet. In 4 movements: Allegro, Andante, alla Minueto, Rondo: Allegro Moderato. (Note: Manuel (1955) lists a "Sonata" with the movements "Allegro, Andante alla Minuet, Rondo, Allegro Moderato" while Epistola (1996) Lists the F major quartet with the movements "Allegro, Andante, alla Minueto, Rondo: Allegro Moderato")	Lost
1921	Sonata in G Major	Piano, Sonata	3, no. 1?	In 3 movements: Allegro, Adagio, Presto. The first Piano Sonata made by a Filipino composer. It was submitted as a graduation piece. The work was lost.	Lost
1921	Sonata in C Major	Piano, Sonata	3, no. 2	In 3 movements: Allegro con moto, Adagio, Rondo: Allegro con moto quasi vivace. It was submitted as a graduation piece.	Rediscovered
1921	Sonata	Piano, Sonata	3, no. 3?	In 4 movements: Allegro, Andante alla Minueto, Rondo, Allegro Moderato. (Note: Manuel (1955) lists a "Sonata" with the movements "Allegro, Andante alla Minuet, Rondo, Allegro Moderato" while Epistola (1996) Lists the F major quartet with the movements "Allegro, Andante, alla Minueto, Rondo: Allegro Moderato")	Lost
1921	Longing	Vocal, Chamber		Quartet for three voices	
1921	Fughetta in C on a Theme by Mozart	Chamber		for String Quartet	Ms.
1921	Mountain Suite	Orchestral		In 4 movements: Ang Liwayway (Dawn), Sayaw ng mga Diwata (Dance of the Nymphs), Ang Matanda sa Punso (The Old Man of the Anthill), Ang Sayaw ng mga Ita (Negrito Dance) The material for this suite was reworked from his sarswela Akibat. Originally called Mountain Scenes.	
1921	Ave Maria	Vocal, Chamber, Sacred			Published
1921	Nocturne	Piano solo		From Three Pieces for the Pianoforte	Lost
1921	Valse Caprice	Piano solo		From Three Pieces for the Pianoforte	Lost
1921	Fantasie-Impromptu	Piano solo		From Three Pieces for the Pianoforte	Ms. copy
1921	The Violet	Vocal		a trio for 3 sopranos	
1921	U.P. Spells "Up"	Vocal		from The First University Song Collection of the University of the Philippines. English text by Guy Potter Benton.	Published
1921	Alma Mater U.P.	Vocal		from The First University Song Collection of the University of the Philippines. English text by Gerardo Monden.	Published
1921	Conservatory Commencement Hymn	Choral, Hymn		from The First University Song Collection of the University of the Philippines. English text by Robert Schofield.	Published
1921	Coronation March	Orchestral, March		written for the Carnival Queen Carmencita Prieto	
1921	First Nocturne	Piano solo			Published
1921	Cavatina	Chamber	7	for Violin and Piano. Published 1927 by Theodore Presser Co.	Published
1921	Romanza	Chamber	8	for Cello and Piano; dedicated to Antonio Molina. Published 1928 by Oliver Ditson Company	Published
1921	Valse Caprice	Piano solo		dedicated to Pedro Eloriaga	Lost
1922	Serenade	Chamber		for Cello and Piano	
1922	Ang Aking Bayan	Vocal		Tagalog Lyrics by the composer	Published
1922	Paraluman	Vocal, Waltz		Tagalog Lyrics by Mariano Velayo	Published
1922	Valse in D♭	Piano Solo	11		Lost
1922	An Offertory to St. Cecilia	Vocal, Sacred			
1922	A Historical Pageant	Band, Incidental Music		Consists of an Overture and 12 other movements: I. Sight of the Ship, II-IV. Untitled, V. Dance of the Bolomen, VI. Untitled, VII. Shields and Spears, VIII. Untitled, IX. Kumintang Dance, X. Untitled XI. Pasodoble for Exit, XII. Blood Compact.	Ms.
1922	Princess' Dance	Piano		Movement from A Historical Pageant arranged to piano.	Published
1922 September 13	Initiation Song	Vocal		for the Rizal Center Fraternity	
1922	Ang Mestisa	Sarswela		libretto by Ingracio Valmonte	
1922 November 30	Bonifacio Song	Vocal, March		English Lyrics by Francisco Carballo	
1923	Nasaan ka Irog	Vocal, Kundiman		Tagalos Lyrics by Nemestio Asistio, Spanish version by Jesus Balmori	Published
1923	Kundiman	Chamber		for Violin and Piano	Published
1923	Piano Concerto in B♭ minor	Concerto	12	In 3 Movements: Allegro Moderato, Andante Romantico, Allegro Fantastico. It was the first Piano Concerto written by a Filipino Composer.	Ms. copy
1923	Processional March	Orchestral, March			
1923	Capriccio Espagnole	Chamber	15	for violin and piano	Published
1923	Pearl of the Orient	Band, March		Recorded by the Baliuag Buenaventura Band in 1958	Ms.
1924 January 9	Wedding March	Orchestral, March		for the wedding anniversary of Marcelo Adonay	
1924 March 29	Stabat Mater	Vocal, Chamber, Sacred			Ms.
1924	Meditation	Harmonium solo			
1924	Kundiman ng Luha	Vocal, Kundiman		Tagalog Lyrics by Jose Corazon de Jesus; Dedicated to Samahang Bulakan	Published
1924	Petite Serenade	Chamber		for violin and piano	
1924 December 30	Ultimo Adios	Choral, Orchestral		for Female Chorus and Orchestra; Composition based on a poem by Jose Rizal	Published
1925	Magbalik ka, Hirang	Vocal, Kundiman		Tagalog Lyrics by Filomena Alcanar; Dedicated to Candida Moreno; with violin obbligato	
1925	Pahimakas	Vocal		Tagalog Lyrics by Jose Corazon de Jesus; Dedicated to Jose Mossesgeld Santiago	Published
1925	Canto del Viajero	Vocal		Composition based on a poem by Jose Rizal	Published
1926 May 2	Dakilang Punglo	Sarswela		in 3 acts; libretto by Servando de los Angeles.	
1926	Bituing Marikit	Vocal, Danza Menor		from the sarswela Dakilang Punglo	Published
1926	Health Service Hymn	Choral, Hymn		for the Philippine Health Service, Manila	
1926	Mutya ng Pasig	Vocal, Kumintang		Tagalog Lyrics by Deogracias A. Rosario, later arranged for orchestra by the composer	Published
1927	Himno kay Plaridel	Orchestral		Manuscript copy for Voice and Piano exists dated August 20, 1927	Ms. copy
1928	Himutok	Vocal, Kundiman		Tagalog Lyrics by the composer	Published
1928	Valse Extase	Chamber, Waltz		for saxophone and piano	
1928	National Heroes' Day Hymn	Choral, Hymn		Lyrics by Alfredo B. German	Published
1928	Into your Eyes	Vocal, Ballad		English lyrics by Paul R. Verzosa	
1929 December 23	Balitaw	Vocal, Ballad		Visayan Lyrics by Ramon Abellanos, Tagalogg Byrics by the composer	
1929	Pahiwatig	Vocal, Danza		Tagalog Lyrics by the composer. Dedicated to Clarita Tankiang	Published
1929	Reverie	Chamber		for violin and piano	
1929	Ang Dakilang Pagyayakap	Vocal, Paso-doble		Lyrics by Florentino Ballecer	Published
1929	Ikaw Rin	Vocal, Kundiman		Tagalog Lyrics by the composer, Spanish version by Manuel Barnabe, Dedicated to Celedonia Ongpin	Published
1929 December 23	Paalam sa Pagkakadalaga	Folk		Folk song arrangement	
1929 December 23	Lulay	Folk		Folk song arrangement	
1929 December 23	May Isang Bulaklak na Ibig Lumitaw	Folk		Folk song arrangement	
1930	Kumintang ng Bayan	Vocal, Kumintang		Lyrics by the composer	
1930	Kung ako'y Umibig	Vocal, Kundiman		Lyrics by the composer	Published
1930 May	Himno Masonico	Choral, Hymn		winner in a contest by the Grand Lodge of Manila	
1930	Halika, Magandang Mutya	Vocal, Serenade		Lyrics by the composer	
1930	Marcha Triunfal	March		Dedicated to Logia Isla de Luzon no. 57	
1930	Sa Iyong Kandungan	Vocal, Kundiman		Tagalog Lyrics by the composer; Sugbuanon Lyrics by Manuel Velez	Published
1930	Nasaan ang aking Puso	Vocal, Kundiman			Published
1930	Naku Kenkoy	Vocal		Tagalog Lyrics by Romulado G. Ramos	Published
1930 April 17	Tayo'y Pakasal na	Vocal, Sarswela		A song from a sarswela by Servando de los Angeles	
1930	Reminiscenes	Vocal		Favorite song of Isagani Velayo's grandmother transcribed by Abelardo. Tagalog Lyrics by Valentin Abelardo	
1930 April 7	Ay Kalisud	Folk, Foxtrot		Arranged as a foxtrot for orchestra	
1930 April 7	Batobato at Siniguelas	Vocal, Sarswela		additional song from a Tagalog Sarswela	
1930 June 10	Anong Sarap mong Umibig	Vocal, Sarswela		additional song from a Tagalog Sarswela Dalawang Pag-asa by Florentino Ballecer	
1930	Ang Puso ko'y Nalulumbay	Vocal, Sarswela		additional song from a Tagalog Sarswela Dakilang Punglo by Florentino Ballecer	
1930 June 30	Ayokong Ayoko	Vocal		Music and Lyrics by Florentino Ballecer, harmonized by Abelardo	
1930 June 21	Doon po sa Aming Bayan	Vocal		Music and Lyrics by Florentino Ballecer, harmonized by Abelardo	
1930 June 21	Walang Palad sa Paggiliw	Vocal		A "Duo de Amor"	
1930 June 21	Ang Dagat na Malawak	Vocal		A Barcarole	
1930 June 21	Ang Babae kung Pangit	Vocal		Music and Lyrics by Florentino Ballecer, harmonized by Abelardo	
1930 June 21	Pag-ibig na Walang Hanggan	Vocal		A duet	
1930 July 12	Hoy-hoy	Vocal			
1930 July 12	May Isang Dalagang Nanggaling sa Bukid	Vocal			
1930 July 12	Ayaw sa Pusa	Vocal		An "Awit Lansangan" Music and by Florentino Ballecer and Abelardo; Lyrics by Ballecer	
1930 July 12	Sa Gintong Panaginip	Vocal, Kumintang		Lyrics by Florentino Ballecer	
1930 July 12	Sa Pugad ng Paggiliw	Vocal		Music and Lyrics by Florentino Ballecer, harmonized by Abelardo	
1930 July 12	Kaiingat Ka	Vocal		Music and Lyrics by Florentino Ballecer, harmonized by Abelardo	
1930 July 12	Sa Bayang Marungko	Vocal		Music and Lyrics by Florentino Ballecer, harmonized by Abelardo	
1931 January 10	Intermezzo	Band		Awarded First Prize and gold medal at the 1931 Philippine Carnival Contest, entered under the pseudonym "Batong-Buhay"	
1931 January 10	Valse Elegante	Band		Awarded First Prize at the 1931 Philippine Carnival Contest, entered under the pseudonym "Araw"	
1931 February	Ang Likha ni Pierrot/Batik ng Kabihasnan	Sarswela		libretto by Florentino Ballecer	
1931 March 5	Buhay ng Binata't Dalaga	Vocal		Dialogue by Danding Gabriel	
1931 March 5	Bibingka't Langgunisa	Vocal		Dialogue by Danding Gabriel	
1931 June 5	Waltz	Waltz		written in Chicago	
1931 June	Fugue for String Quartet	Chamber		written in Chicago	
1931 June 28	The Flower and the Bird	Chamber, Caprice		written in Chicago; for flute, violin, and piano	
1931 July 5	A Summer Idyll	Chamber		written in Chicago; for violin, clarinet, and piano	
1931 July 22	A Naughty Nymph	Chamber, polka		written in Chicago; for flute and piano	
1931 July 28	Fifes and Castagnettes	Chamber, Bolero		written in Chicago; for flute and piano	
1931 September 7	Violin Sonata	Chamber		written in Chicago; In 3 movements: Allegro, Andante, Allegro con moto. The first movement was finished on July 13, 1931.	Ms.
1931 November 25	Cinderella Overture	Orchestral, Overture		written in Chicago; this piece won him the LaViolette Scholarship Award	Ms.
1931 November 25	Sinfonietta for String Orchestra	Orchestral		written in Chicago	Ms.
1931 November	Panoramas	Chamber		written in Chicago; for flute, violin, viola, celesta, and piano	Ms.
1932 January 8	Second Fugue for String Quartet	Chamber		written in Chicago	Ms.
1932 June	Symphony	Orchestral		written in Chicago; unfinished; intended to be his graduate piece but he chose Sonata for String Quartet instead.	Lost
1932 June 6	Sonata for String Quartet	Chamber		written in Chicago; offered as graduate composition	
1932 October 7	A Study in Kumintang	Chamber		for Piano and String Quartet; Dedicated for the wedding anniversary of Hon. Noberto Romualdez	Ms.
1932	Salve Regina Mater	Vocal, Chamber, Sacred		for Soprano, baritone, and trio	
1932	Visayan Caprice	Chamber		for violin, cello, and piano	Published
1932	Emilio Jacinto	Vocal		English lyrics by Francisco Carballo	
1932	Song of the Lonesome Traveller	Vocal			Published
1933	Spirit of '96	Overture		for Band	
1933	National Institute Song	Vocal			
1933	Himig ng bayan	Chamber, Overture		for String Band. Composed for the Doce Estrellas Society of Licab, Nueva Ecija	
1933	Carola	Foxtrot		a tango-foxtrot	
1934 January	Dawn	Dance		A dance composed for a Pageant titled "The Triumph of Eros" held by the University of the Philippines on February 6, 1934. Instrumentation by Antonino Buenaventura.	
1934 March 15	Panghanga	Vocal, Kundiman		dedicated to Carnival Queen Clarita Tankiang	
1934	Requiem	Choral, Orchestral, Sacred		Composed in memory of Marcelo Adonay.	Lost
1934	Florante at Laura	Opera		unfinished	Lost
undated	Violin Concerto	Concerto		unfinished; Exists as Violin and Piano; one movement completed and arranged by Antonio Molina for violin and orchestra Exact date of composition unknown, but stylistic analysis of the work has estimated the composition date to be roughly 1920.	Ms. copy
undated	Rondo and Double Fugue	Orchestral		unfinished.	
undated	Un cuento de Lola Basiang	Vocal		A musical sketch in 7 scenes	
undated	Lola Basyang	Band, March		Recorded by the Baliuag Buenaventura Band in 1958	Ms.
undated	Kasaganaan	Band, March		Recorded by the Baliuag Buenaventura Band in 1958	Ms.
undated	Tinig ng mga Kahabag-habag	Vocal		Dedicated to the lepers	
undated	Visayan Orientale	Waltz			
undated	Ang Binatang Filipino	Waltz		co-composed with Jose L. Santos	
undated	Sa Libingan ng Irog	Vocal, Kundiman		Tagalog Lyrics by Pedro Icasiano	
undated	Our National Pride	Vocal		Dedicated to Gabino Tabuñar of the National University	
undated	Libertador	Choral, Hymn		Dedicated to Sergio Osmeña	
undated	Grand March	March			
undated	Ikaw	Tango			
undated	Bunying M. H. Del Pilar	Hymn		Probably composed 1920; probably the same piece as Himno Plaridel	
undated	Modernista				
undated	Ode to the Sampagita	Vocal		English Lyrics by Mauro Mendel. Composed for the Philippine Women's University	
undated	Honor and Arms	Orchestral, March			
undated	Sumilang	Sarswela		In 3 acts; libretto by Basilio Lanuza. Written after 1911	
undated	Makabagong Dalaga	Play		In 3 acts. Lyrics by Mariano Velayo.	
undated	Ang Tala ng Universidad	Sarswela		In 3 acts; libretto by Danding Gabriel	
undated	Ang Batang Tulisan	Play		In 4 acts; libretto by Bernardino Buenaventura; Lyrics by Danding Gabriel	
undated	Puri ng Mahirap	Sarswela		librettist unknown	

== Discography ==
Many of Abelardo's songs and kundimans were recorded during his lifetime by his friends and colleagues, such as Jose Mossesgeld Santiago and Jovita Fuentes. After the war his kundimans were frequently recorded by recording artists such as Sylvia la Torre, Conching Rosal, and Don David. The following is an incomplete list of recordings of some of his famous kundimans:

Kundiman Discography
Title	Performer	Date	Source
Kung Hindi Man	Don David		
Kung Hindi Man	Jovita Fuentes		
Kung Hindi Man	Jose Mossesgeld Santiago	2013	
Kung Hindi Man	Joseph Legaspi		
Nasaan ka, Irog?	Nati de Arellano	December 7, 1929	
Nasaan ka, Irog?	Jose Mossesgeld Santiago		
Nasaan ka, Irog?	Don David		
Nasaan ka, Irog?	Sylvia la Torre		
Nasaan ka, Irog?	William Lim	2013	
Bituing Marikit	Don David		
Bituing Marikit	Conching Rosal		
Bituing Marikit	Sylvia la Torre		
Bituing Marikit	Joseph Legaspi	2013	
Mutya ng Pasig	Jovita Fuentes	April 20, 1938	
Mutya ng Pasig	Nati de Arellano	June 28, 1929	
Mutya ng Pasig	Conching Rosal		
Mutya ng Pasig	Sylvia la Torre		
Kundiman ng Luha	Jovita Fuentes		
Kundiman ng Luha	Arrigo Pola	1951	
Kundiman ng Luha	Jose Mossesgeld Santiago		
Kundiman ng Luha	Don David		
Kundiman ng Luha	Joseph Legaspi	2013	
Magbalik ka, Hirang	Arrigo Pola	1951	
Magbalik ka, Hirang	Jose Mossesgeld Santiago		
Magbalik ka, Hirang	Katrina Saporsantos	2013	
Pahimakas	Jose Mossesgeld Santiago	1926 June	
Pahimakas	Katrina Saporsantos	2013	
Ikaw Rin!	Jose Mossesgeld Santiago		
Ikaw Rin!	Joseph Legaspi	2013	
Himutok	Don David		
Himutok	Conching Rosal		
Himutok	William Lim	2013	
Pahiwatig	Sylvia la Torre		
Pahiwatig	William Lim	2013	
