= Piano Concerto in B-flat minor =

Piano Concerto in B-flat minor may refer to:

- Piano Concerto No. 1 (Tchaikovsky)
- Piano Concerto No. 1 (Scharwenka)
- Piano Concerto (Santiago)
