= Ric Manrique Jr. =

Filipino musician

- Birth name: Ricardo Manrique Jr.
- Born: 23 May 1941; Philippines
- Died: 22 September 2017 (aged 76); California, U.S.
- Occupation(s): Singer, businessman

Ricardo "Ric" Manrique Jr. (23 May 1941 – 22 September 2017) was a Filipino kundiman singer. He was known as one of the two Hari ng Kundiman (Kings of Kundiman) in the Philippines, alongside Ruben Tagalog.

== Early career ==
He was a member of the Mabuhay Singers in the 1950s. He recorded his first album in the early 1960s and recorded most of his songs with Villar Records.

== Later career and solo career ==
Manrique was best known for his songs that became theme songs of popular Filipino films. The song entitled "Ang Daigdig Ko'y Ikaw" is the theme song from the 1965 film of the same title starring Fernando Poe Jr. and Susan Roces. It was sung in collaboration with Pilita Corrales.

== Death ==
Manrique died on September 23, 2017, in California, United States.

== Discography ==
Villar International Music Publishing:

- 1995: D'yos Lamang ang Nakakaalam
- 1997: Kundiman
- 2007: Ang Pasko ay Pag-ibig
- 2009: Ric Manrique Jr. Sings Ilocano Songs
- 2010: Sa Piling Mo
- 2010: Dahil sa Isang Bulaklak
- 2013: Magbalik Ka Lamang
