= Piano Concerto (Santiago) =

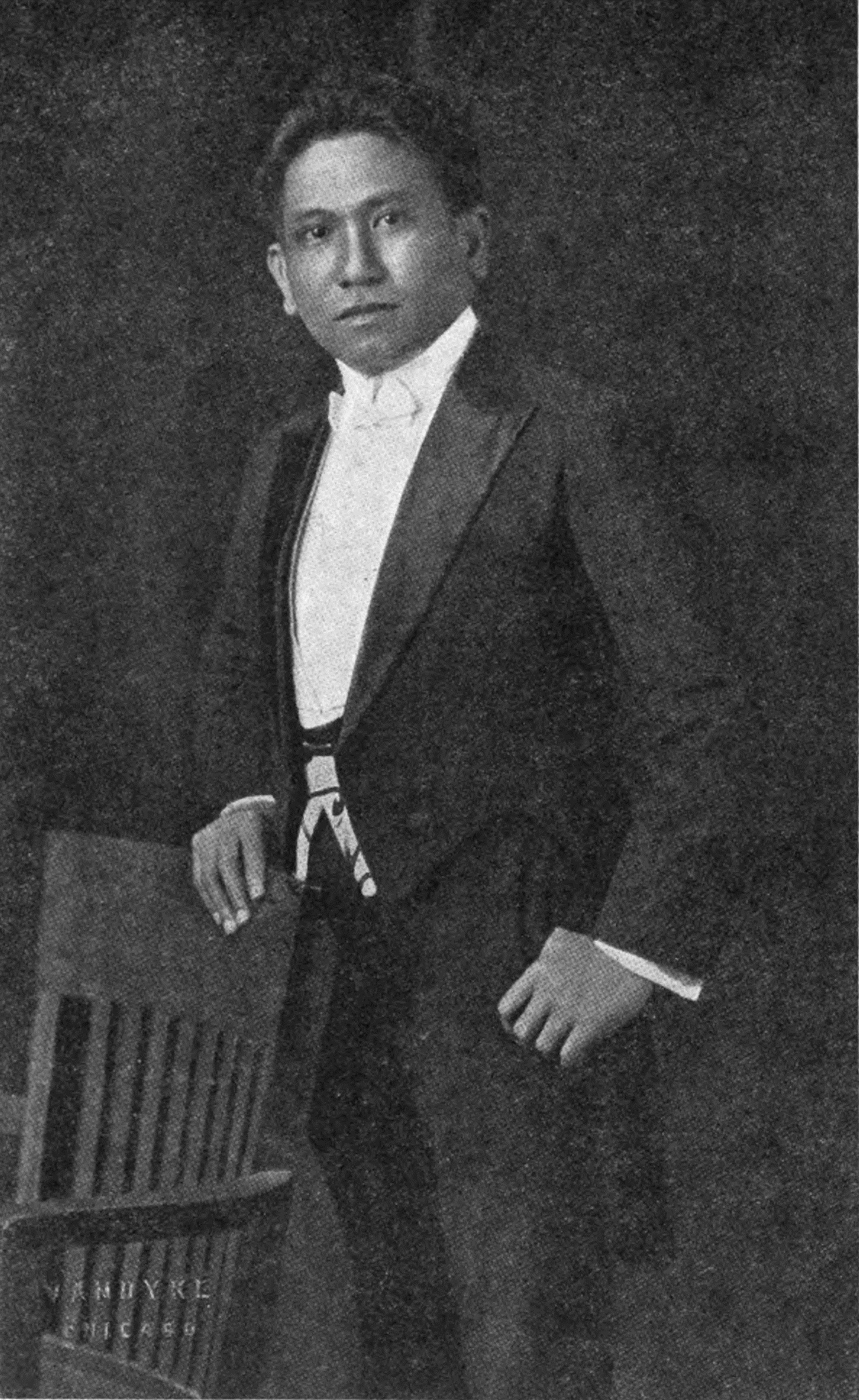
The composer in 1924, shortly after the completion of his Piano Concerto

Francisco Santiago's Piano Concerto in B♭ minor was written in 1924 as his doctoral dissertation while he was studying at Chicago. It was premiered at Chicago on June 15, 1924, as a part of Santiago's graduation recital. He was assisted by his teacher Heniot Levy, who played the accompaniment. The premiere in Chicago and subsequent performances in Manila in 1925 were positively received; Santiago's professors and critics locally and abroad hailed the work as the composer's masterpiece.

== Structure ==
The Concerto was cast in three movements, with each movement using folk songs as themes:

1. Moderato e maestoso (based on Balitaw)
2. Andante amoroso (based on the Kundiman and Awit)
3. Allegro scherzando – Piu mosso (based on Leron Leron Sinta and Condansoy)

== Destruction and reconstruction ==
During the Liberation of Manila in February 1945, constant bombing and fighting by the Americans and Japanese completely devastated the city. Historic buildings were burned along with countless treasures and documents stored within them. Francisco Santiago's compositions weren't spared – while escaping the bombings, a wooden cart full of his compositions (most of them unpublished) and other valuables caught fire near a church, destroying most of his compositions, including his Piano Concerto.

In 1952, the Antipolo Church Reconstruction Committee planned a concert featuring Francisco Santiago's compositions. The Committee sponsored the reconstruction of several of Santiago's destroyed works, including the Concerto.

The pianist and Santiago's former pupil Juan Bañez spearheaded the reconstruction of the Concerto. With the help of Santiago's former colleagues Antonino Buenaventura, Antonio Molina, and Felipe Padilla de Leon and others, they finished reconstructing the Concerto on September 12, 1952, and it was performed shortly after.
