= Villar Records =

- Founded: 1950
- Founder: Manuel P. Villar
- Distributor: self-distributed
- Genre: Various
- Country of origin: Philippines
- Location: Manila
- Official website: Villar Music

Villar Records is a Filipino record label owned by Mareco, Inc. which also owns the Mabuhay Records label. It was launched in 1950 by the late Manuel P. Villar who was known as the "Father of Philippine Recording" for pioneering the recording of original Pilipino music or OPM. He was also the first president of the Record Industry Association of the Philippines (RIAP).

Mareco, Inc. bought original compositions from various Filipino artists and commercially produced recordings of numerous folk songs, Kundiman, balitaw and other traditional music from different regions of the Philippines, keeping indigenous music alive in the 1950s and 1960s in the face of American and British imports. It also produced ethnic sounds of the Ilocos, Cebu, Iloilo, Cordillera, Tausug and Maranao tribes. All these indigenous music recordings were marketed under the labels Mabuhay Records and Villar Records. The company was first to produce a recording of the Philippine National Anthem.

It has released prolific amounts of recordings from certain of its artists, to the point where it was noted internationally in Billboard. Villar released 18 albums of organ music in a single year from artist Relly Coloma, who surpassed the record held by the Mabuhay Singers. Coloma released 50 albums by early 1971, all on Villar.

Mareco, Inc. is currently managed by Luis P. Villar from its offices in Tirad Pass, Sta. Mesa Heights, Quezon City, Philippines (the studios of radio station 105.1 Crossover — now as 105.1 Brigada News FM, which is owned by the Mareco Broadcasting Network, Inc. is also located here). The company's extensive collection of music recordings is globally distributed through Villar Records International from offices in Manila, Philippines and Los Angeles, United States.

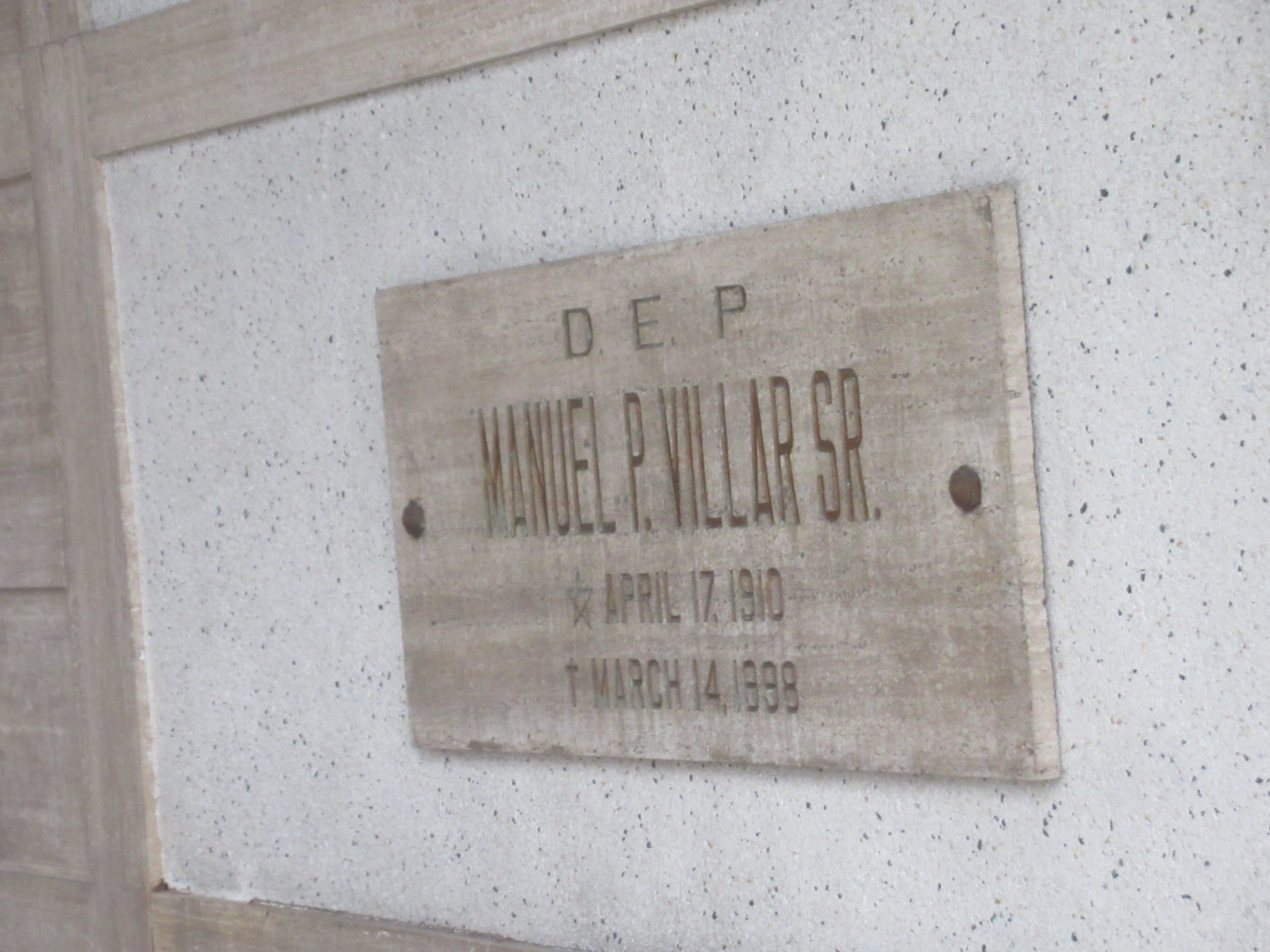
Villar Records' Manuel P. Villar's ("Father of Philippine Recording") family mausoleum at La Loma Cemetery.

== Artists ==
- Sylvia La Torre
- Ruben Tagalog
- Diomedes Maturan
- Bobby Gonzales
- Ric Manrique Jr.
- Leo Valdez
- Pedro Concepcion
- Juan Silos, Jr.
- Pilita Corrales
- Sampaguita
- Nora Aunor
- Nora Hermosa (Nora H. Pacres)
- Carmen Camacho
- Raye Lucero
- Mabuhay Singers
- Cely Bautista
- Hotdog
- Relly Coloma
- Roland Valentino
- Carmelita Alburo
- Flor Ocampo
