= Carmen Camacho =

Carmen Camacho may refer to:

- Carmen Camacho (singer) (born 1939), Filipino singer
- Carmen Camacho (writer) (born 1976), Spanish writer
- Marita del Carmen Camacho Quirós (born 1911), former First Lady of Costa Rica; supercentenarian
