= Kundiman =

Type of Filipino love song

- Etymology: "Kung hindi man", which means "if it were not so"
- Stylistic origins: Philippine folk music
- Cultural origins: Late 19th century, Tagalog, specifically Batangas, also other Ethnic groups in the Philippines in the Philippine Islands
- Typical instruments: Vocals • Classical Guitar • Ukulele • Acoustic Guitar • Violin • Piano • Bandurria • Rondalla • Symphony Orchestra
- Derivative forms: Zarzuela; Manila sound OPM

Kundiman is a genre of traditional Filipino ballads, predominantly with romantic themes. The lyrics of the kundiman are written in Tagalog. The melody is characterized by a smooth, flowing and gentle rhythm with dramatic intervals. Kundiman was the traditional means of serenade in the Philippines.

The kundiman emerged as an art song at the end of the 19th century and by the early 20th century, but this art of singing is said to even already exist in Visayan Islands even before the Tagalogs adopted it. Its musical structure was formalized by Filipino composers such as Francisco Santiago and Nicanor Abelardo who sought poetry for their lyrics, blending verse and music in equal parts.

== Etymology ==
Several theories have been proposed regarding the etymology of the word kundiman.

One theory traces the term to the Tagalog phrase "kung hindi man", with meanings such as—but not limited to—"if not", "if not meant to be", or "if it were not so", from which kundiman is believed to have evolved through grammatical contraction. This origin has once been corroborated with a claim about an irritable Spanish priest who, on being awakened by a group of haranistas singing the Tagalog phrase "Kung hindi man dapat sa iyong kariktan ..." ("If [it does/they do/I do] not belong with your loveliness...") under the window of a neighboring house with a young lady, stuck his head out and shouted: "Will you stop that kundiman?".

Another theory suggests that the word originated from a traditional folk verse in which it first appeared and repeatedly. This theory was attributed to Don Epifanio delos Santos y Cristobal, who explains that the word kundiman came from a nonsensical rhyme which was very popular among the natives of Cavite in which it was used as a teasing ditty on their young women who were known for their shyness or pretended shyness: "Hele-hele nang kundangan, hele-hele nang kundiman." (Note: While the Tagalog word hele-hele generally means pretending reluctance or being coy, in can be equated to the English phrase "playing hard to get" in context of courtship.)

A third interpretation associates kundiman with a red garment worn by male dancers during ritual performances in rural communities. Supporters of this theory cite a line from a folk song popular in Cavite in 1873: "Mula nang mauso / damit ng kundiman" ("Since kundiman clothing came into fashion").

== Structure ==
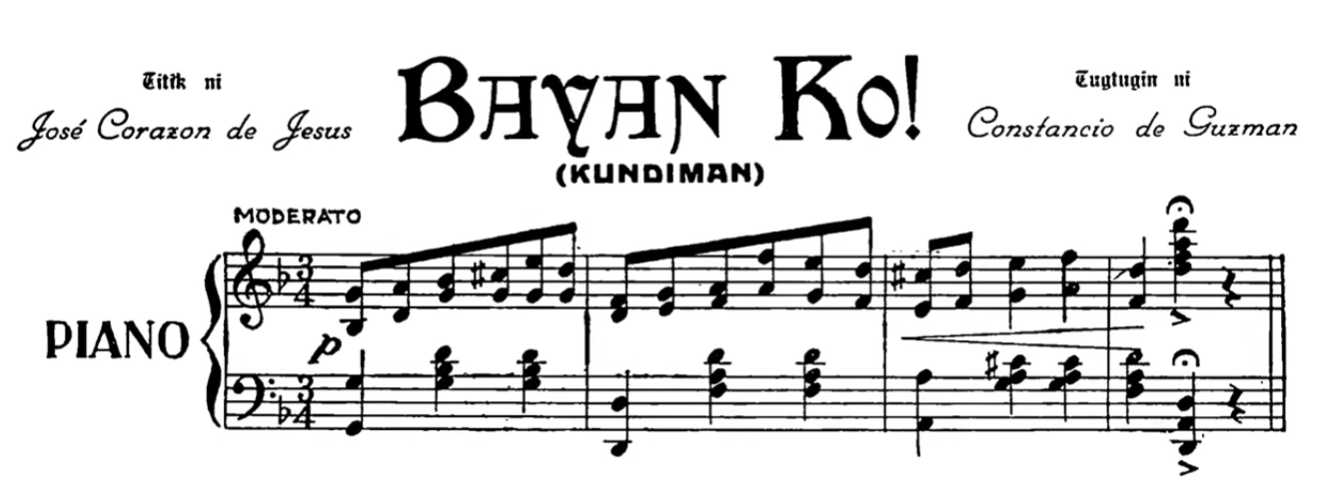
First line of a sheet music for Bayan Ko! by Constancio De Guzman (1929)

The formalized art song structure of the kundiman is characterized by moderate 3/4 time. One of its defining features is the shift from a minor key in the opening section to the parallel major key in the next section. For example, a kundiman that begins in C minor moves to C major midway through the song. This change in tonality is considered a key feature of the genre, and songs that do not follow this pattern are often not classified as kundiman. The character and structural elements of the kundiman is also derived from an earlier Tagalog tune called comintang.

Kundiman is often mistaken for a harana because haranistas would oftentimes sing kundiman songs during a harana, but they are stylistically different.

== Historical background ==
The kundiman is a genre of Filipino song that emerged from the broader semi-classical music tradition of the Philippines. Originally associated with lyrical expressions of love, the kundiman evolved through the late Spanish colonial and early American periods into a cultivated art song form shaped by theater, folk music, and Western musical practices.

The development of the kundiman is closely tied to the rise of vernacular musical theater in the Philippines. By 1900, the native sarswela—derived from the Spanish zarzuela introduced in 1879—had become an important venue for musical composition and performance. The solo songs featured in sarswela productions became stylistic models for the classical kundiman as well as for later Filipino love songs and ballads.

=== The evolution of kundiman ===
==== Late 19th century ====
In 1872, the Franciscan scholar and Tagalist Joaquín de Coria published Nueva Gramática Tagalog Teorica-Práctica which, besides discussing Tagalog grammar and poetry, the book identified major Tagalog song forms, including the cundiman, which it described as a love song especially used in serenading. Other song forms listed included the kumintang, soliranin, and hele-hele.

In 1874, Spanish scholar Venancio María de Abella described the "cumintan" and "cundiman" in Manual de la Conversación Familiar Español-Tagalog as canción indígena, or native songs of the Tagalogs. He characterized the melody of the "cumintan" as "somewhat pathetic and monotonous, but not lacking in a certain pleasant feeling," and described the "cundiman" (kundiman) as similar to the former, but with some variations.

In Cuentos Filipinos, Spanish writer and historian José Montero y Vidal documented in 1883 the lyrics of a popular kundiman sung by Tagalogs, emphasizing its sorrowful and sentimental tone.

In 1888, Spanish historian Wenceslao E. Retana recorded a Batangas kundiman in El Indio Batangueño. The lyrics reflected themes of love, hardship, humility, and emotional longing, while also preserving the refrain "Hele ng Cundiman".

In Spanish colonial period, the kundiman became associated with veiled patriotism. Expressions of romantic devotion in kundiman songs were interpreted as symbolic declarations of love for the motherland and aspirations for freedom under colonial rule. José Rizal incorporated the kundiman into his novel Noli Me Tangere, explicitly mentioned and featured into two major parts of the book, in Chapter 23: "The Fishing Excursion" (Ang Piknik/Buwaya) with the song "Canto de Maria Clara", and in Chapter 39: "Doña Consolacion" (Ang Dalawang Senyora) with "Kundiman ng Gabi".

Rizal also composed his own kundiman, Kundiman ni Rizal. Unlike traditional melancholic kundiman songs, Rizal’s composition carried themes of protest, national awakening, and the assertion of Filipino rights.

==== The golden era (1910s–1930s) ====
In 1905, Isabelo de los Reyes composed the Kundiman Jocelynang Baliwag, with music by Lucino Buenaventura, and the former also wrote the serialized novella Ang Singsing ng Dalagang Marmol, along with a series of related songs—including Liwayway, Pepita, and El Anillo de la Dalaga de Mármol—as part of his courtship of Josefa “Pepita” Tiongson y Lara of Baliwag. The lyrics of Jocelynang Baliwag even form an acrostic of Tiongson’s nickname, “Pepita,” reflecting de los Reyes’ admiration for her.

Clip of "Ang Maya" recording sung by Maria Carpena in 1908.

In 1908, the singer Maria Carpena was considered the first Filipino recording artist. Her recording of the song "Ang Maya", composed by Jose Estella with lyrics by dramatist Severino Reyes under the American label Victor Records, was issued around 1908-1909. One interpretation is that the song alludes to freedom from the colonizer.

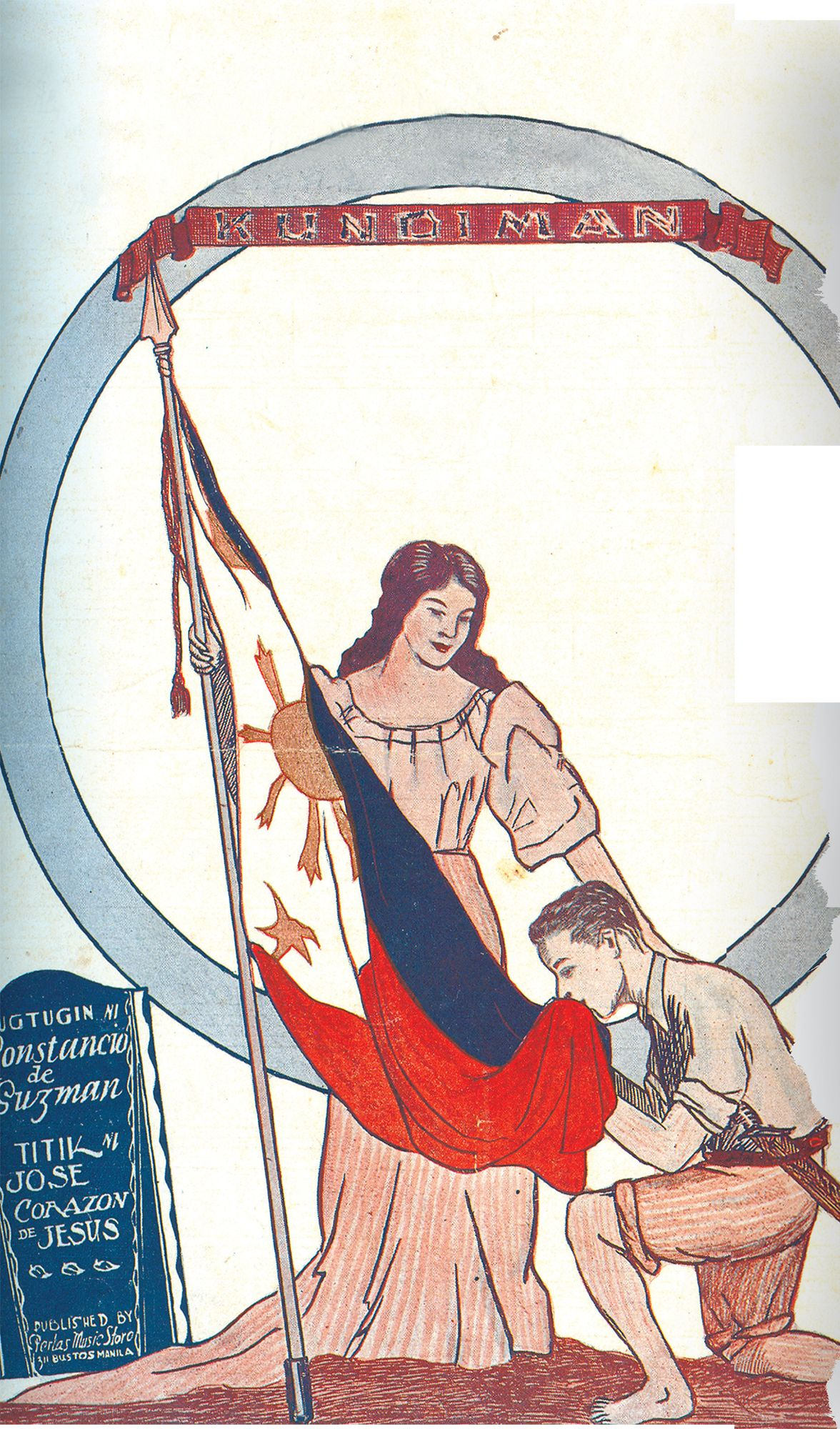
Constancio de Guzman’s “Bayan Ko” written in the kundiman form whose roots are deep in the Filipino psyche, has virtually become the country’s cry of protest.

In 1916, Dr. Juan V. Pagaspas, a doctor of philosophy from Indiana University and a much beloved educator in Tanauan, Batangas described the kundiman as "a pure Tagalog song which is usually very sentimental, so sentimental that if one should listen to it carefully watching the tenor of words and the way the voice is conducted to express the real meaning of the verses, he cannot but be conquered by a feeling of pity even so far as to shed tears."

Dr. Francisco Santiago, dubbed as the "Father of the Kundiman Art Song" or also "Father of Filipino Musical Nationalism", briefly explains in his scholarly work The Development of Music in the Philippines that the reason it is called kundiman is because the very first prolific Tagalog love song written.

Santiago declared in the late 1930s that kundiman "is the love song par excellence of the Filipinos, the plaintive song which goes deepest into their hearts, song which brings them untold emotions." Endowed with such power, the kundiman naturally came to serve as a vehicle for veiled patriotism in times of colonial oppression, in which the undying love for a woman symbolized the love of country and desire for freedom.

Kundiman transitioned from a folk song tradition into a concert form through the work of Bonifacio Abdon, who adapted native Filipino tunes and musical structures into more formal compositions. Inspired by the approach of European composers such as Franz Schubert, Felix Mendelssohn, and Robert Schumann, Abdon introduced greater sophistication and complexity to the genre while preserving its traditional romantic themes. This development helped kundiman remain popular among the Filipino public while also establishing it as a respected form of art music.

==== Radio and film era (1950s) ====
Jocelynang Baliwag, a kundiman closely associated with the town of Baliwag, traces its origins to a melody that circulated in older folk songs before being given lyrics. In 1940, UP College of Music professor and future National Artist Antonio Molina introduced the piece as the "Kundiman ng Himagsikan", later publishing a transcription in 1941. He had seen the phrase "música del legítimo kundiman procedente del campo insurrecto" on the music sheet and mistakenly interpreted it as referring to the Philippine Revolution, an incorrect historical contextualization.

The Filipino composer, conductor and scholar Felipe M. de León Jr., wrote that the kundiman is a "unique musical form expressing intense longing, caring, devotion and oneness with a beloved. Or with a child, spiritual figure, motherland, ideal or cause. According to its text, a kundiman can be romantic, patriotic, religious, mournful. Or a consolation, a lullaby. Or a protest and other types. But of whatever type, its music is soulful and lofty, conveying deep feelings of devotional love."

In 1950, Villar Records, a seminal Filipino record label was established. It played a defining role in preserving and popularizing traditional kundiman by releasing prolific volumes of recordings by legendary artists.

== Notable Kundiman composers ==
By the early twentieth century, Filipino composers trained in European conservatory traditions began formalizing the kundiman into concert repertoire. According to the National Commission for Culture and the Arts, composers transformed the genre into an "art song" form while retaining its emotional and lyrical characteristics.

Image	Composer	Notes	Sample of Work
	Francisco Santiago	Francisco Santiago (1889–1947) is a composer, pianist, and educator. He served as director of the University of the Philippines Conservatory of Music and helped codify the classical structure of the kundiman. His works combined Romantic-era harmonic language with Filipino melodic idioms. Among his best-known compositions are Pakiusap, Madaling Araw, and Sakali Man. Pakiusap, with lyrics by José Corazón de Jesús and Jesús Balmori, became one of the most enduring kundiman songs of the twentieth century. Scholars credit Santiago with elevating the kundiman from a regional folk tradition into a respected concert genre performed in recital halls and conservatories.	
Nicanor Abelardo Postage Stamp	Nicanor Abelardo	Nicanor Abelardo (1893–1934) was among the most influential Filipino composers of the early twentieth century and is often regarded as the foremost master of the kundiman tradition. Born in Bulacan, he studied at the University of the Philippines Conservatory of Music and later pursued advanced studies in the United States. Abelardo composed more than 140 works, including orchestral pieces, chamber music, and songs, though he is best known for kundiman compositions such as Nasaan Ka Irog, Kundiman ng Luha, and Mutya ng Pasig. Music historians describe Abelardo’s work as more harmonically adventurous than that of many of his contemporaries, incorporating chromaticism and impressionistic textures while preserving the emotional directness of the genre. Abelardo shifted the kundiman away from simple, repetitive chords into a highly expressive, dramatic format.	
Antonio J. Molina, Order of National Artists (NCCA)	Antonio Molina	Antonio Molina (1894–1980), sometimes called the “Claude Debussy of the Philippines,” composed works that blended impressionist harmonies with Filipino themes. Although he was associated with orchestral and chamber music, Molina also contributed to the kundiman repertoire. His kundiman compositions are noted for their lyrical sophistication and refined piano accompaniments. Molina’s broader body of work helped bridge Filipino folk idioms and Western classical music traditions during the twentieth century.	
Constancio De Guzman	Constancio De Guzman	Constancio Canseco De Guzman (1903–1982) was a Filipino composer, musical director, and leader of several music organizations in the Philippines. He studied piano and composition under Nicanor Abelardo during his youth. He subsequently entered the Philippine film industry, where he worked alongside his sister Susana and developed a career that combined music, cinema, and organizational leadership. De Guzman recorded hundreds of musical works under Villar Records and Columbia Records and served as director of the Filipino Society of Composers, Arrangers, and Publishers, as well as several other musical organizations. Among his best-known compositions are Bayan Ko, Babalik Ka Rin, Ang Tangi Kong Pag-ibig, Birheng Walang Dambana, and Maalaala Mo Kaya. He also composed music for films such as Darna, Roberta, and Ikaw ang Aking Buhay, the latter earning him the Best Musical Scorer award from the Filipino Academy of Movie Arts and Sciences in 1959. In 1948, his compositions Ang Bayan Ko and Kung Kita’y Kapiling received recognition at the Paris International Fair, and he was later honored at the Awit Awards for his contributions as a Filipino lyricist.	
Ernani Cuenco	Ernani Cuenco	Ernani Cuenco (1936–1988) introduced modern harmonic techniques into Filipino song composition while remaining rooted in kundiman traditions. He composed songs such as Bato sa Buhangin and Nahan, which displayed melodic contours and emotional themes associated with the classical kundiman style.	
Levi Celerio 2010 stamp of the Philippines	Levi Celerio	Levi Celerio (1910–2002) was a lyricist and composer whose works drew heavily from kundiman traditions despite often being classified within popular Filipino music. His songs emphasized poetic lyricism and sentimental themes that reflected the enduring influence of the genre in twentieth-century Philippine popular culture. Celerio was also known internationally for his unusual ability to play music using a leaf as an instrument.	

== Notable kundiman singers ==
- Corazon Delfino Beloy (1928-2022) (“My Song of Love” 1952)
- Cely Bautista (1939–2018)
- Carmen Camacho (b. 1939)
- Rudy Concepción (1912–1940)
- Cenon Lagman (1936–2013)
- Sylvia La Torre (1933–2022) (dubbed as the "Queen of Kundiman")
- Mabuhay Singers
- Dely Magpayo (1920–2008)
- Ric Manrique Jr. (1941–2017)
- Diomedes Maturan (1941–2002)
- Conching Rosal (1926–1985)
- Ruben Tagalog (1922–1985) (dubbed as the "King of Kundiman")
- Danilo Santos
- Pining Santiago

== See also ==
- Kundiman songs

== In pop culture and events ==
In recent years, kundiman has experienced renewed public interest through music recordings, cultural performances and heritage-based arts initiatives in the Philippines.

=== Modern kundiman ===
In 2009, Filipino rock band Hale released Kundiman, their fourth studio album, through PolyEast Records, marking a transitional period for the band and a creative milestone by featuring an all-Tagalog track list, including songs such as "Bahay Kubo", "Kalesa", and "Aso't Pusa", reflecting the group's interest in incorporating stronger Filipino themes and language into their music. In 2024, Filipino rock band Orange and Lemons released La Bulaqueña under Lilystars Records, marking its first album in 15 years and its fourth studio album overall. The record, which spent four years in development, features eight original songs alongside reinterpretations of the kundiman classic "Bituing Marikit" by Nicanor Abelardo and "Awit ni Maria Clara", a poem from Noli Me Tangere by José Rizal, with vocals by soprano Lara Maigue. The album's title and artwork were inspired by Juan Luna's painting La Bulaqueña.

In mid-2025, emerging Filipino singer and songwriter Matéo, dubbed as a proponent of modern kundiman, released his singles "Lalim", "Pinipili", and "Tungo". Drawing inspiration from the styles of harana and kundiman, Matéo incorporated acoustic instrumentation and lyrical themes of devotion and longing, while also citing Rey Valera as a musical influence. A former member of Kundirana, Matéo gained more than 1.3 million monthly listeners on Spotify and later signed with Abyss Company, reflecting renewed interest in kundiman among contemporary audiences.

=== Kundiman performances and events ===
In 2018, a Filipino musical adaptation of Cyrano de Bergerac entitled Mula sa Buwan (which translates to "From the Moon") was produced by Black Box Productions, first staged in 2016 at the Irwin Theatre and later restaged at Hyundai Hall, Areté in Ateneo de Manila University. Written by Pat Valera (concept, book, and lyrics) and William Manzano (lyrics and music), the production incorporated kundiman, opera, and sarswela influences to evoke themes of romance, melancholy, and nostalgia within its pre-war 1940s Manila setting and was noted for using kundiman-inspired compositions to connect European Romanticism with traditional Tagalog musical culture. The musical returned in 2022 and was staged at the Samsung Performing Arts Theatre in Circuit Makati and was produced by Barefoot Theatre Collaborative (formerly Black Box Productions).

In 2018, Filipino-American singer Kirby Asunto returned to the Philippines for a series of performances in schools and venues across the country that featured Broadway music and traditional Filipino kundiman songs. During an interview conducted on January 29, 2018, at DYDC-FM 104.7 in her hometown of Inopacan, Asunto stated that she aimed to promote kundiman among younger audiences and encourage appreciation of Filipino musical traditions. The tour, which included performances in Quezon City, Cotabato, Digos, and Masbate, formed part of her broader advocacy to preserve kundiman and other forms of Filipino music while highlighting their cultural significance.

The finals of Konsiyerto ng Kundiman: Timpalak Kundiman 2018, a competition for original kundiman compositions, were held on July 31, 2018 at the Tanghalang Aurelio Tolentino inside the Cultural Center of the Philippines as part of the annual Buwan ng Panitikan celebrations. The contest was organized to promote and preserve the kundiman tradition. Performances during the event featured the Mabuhay Singers and the Manila Symphony Junior Orchestra. In October 2018, Filipino soprano Rachelle Gerodias staged a three-day solo concert at the Maybank Performing Arts Theater in Taguig City that focused on the performance and promotion of kundiman music. Organized by ThemeWorks Events, the concert formed part of the Pinoy Playlist Festival and featured collaborations with musicians and performers including Ryan Cayabyab, Raul Sunico, and Jett Pangan, with stage direction by Floy Quintos. The production aimed to present the historical development of kundiman and connect it to contemporary Filipino music, while proceeds from the gala performance supported the Rachelle Gerodias Music Foundation for financially disadvantaged music students.

The Asia Society together with The Philippine Consulate General of Hong Kong staged a concert entitled Kundiman at Kapaskuhan held on December 15, 2018 at Asia Society Hong Kong Center as part of the Asia Society Music Series. The event featured performers including Stefanie Quintin, Ivar-Nicholas Fojas, and Coro D'llera Music Ministry, who presented music celebrating Filipino Christmas traditions and culture. Kundiman was highlighted during the program to showcase its cultural significance alongside the celebration of Kapaskuhan, the Filipino Christmas season.

In 2019, the Kundiman Party, staged by the UP Playwrights' Theater and written by Floy Quintos, used the traditional Filipino kundiman as a central element in exploring themes of political resistance, memory, and contemporary social issues. Directed by Dexter M. Santos and performed at the PETA Theater Center, the play featured arrangements of kundiman works by composers such as Nicanor Abelardo and Francisco Santiago, including "Mutya ng Pasig", "Nasaan Ka Irog", and "Pilipinas Kong Mahal", arranged by Ryan Cayabyab and Krina Cayabyab. Although not structured as a musical, the production presented kundiman as both a cultural symbol and a form of protest, connecting the genre's historical associations with love and patriotism to modern political unrest and activism.

In September 2021, the Cultural Center of the Philippines launched the online musical series “Kung Hindi Man, A Collection of Musical Treasures” through its Sining Sigla outreach program to promote the kundiman during the COVID-19 pandemic. Directed by Dennis Marasigan, the series featured performances by Filipino classical and popular music artists, including members of the Philippine Philharmonic Orchestra, and explored themes traditionally associated with kundiman such as love, patriotism, longing, and national identity. The program aimed to introduce kundiman and related Filipino musical traditions to younger audiences while highlighting the historical and cultural significance of the genre.

Kundiman was prominently featured in the 2023 musical concert Klasical, presented by Ephesus Teatron Group Inc. at OnStage Theatre in Makati as part of the celebration of the 125th anniversary of Philippine Independence. The production highlighted the development of Filipino music by combining traditional local forms with Western-inspired orchestration and arrangements, with kundiman songs such as "Mutya ng Pasig", "Nasaan Ka Irog", "Bituing Marikit", and "Gaano Ko Ikaw Kamahal" included in the repertoire. Through its presentation of romantic love songs, serenades, and patriotic themes, the event emphasized kundiman's role in preserving Filipino cultural heritage and demonstrating the evolution of Philippine musical traditions.

Contemporary efforts to preserve and promote the genre include intimate recital events such as Kundiman After Dark, was held at Sine Pop, a boutique theater housed in a 1948 post-war heritage residence in Cubao, Quezon City. The program, which was open to the public, paid tribute to composer Nicanor Abelardo and his classic works. It ran from late 2025 to early 2026.

On December 30, 2025, the local government of Mogpog, Marinduque held Himig Mogpog: Season 1, a Kundiman competition that celebrated traditional Filipino music and cultural heritage. The event featured participants who performed kundiman songs while wearing traditional Filipiniana or Barong attire, with the competition aiming to preserve and promote kundiman as a musical form associated with themes of love, patriotism, and Filipino identity. Organized alongside the Tubungan competition for elementary and high school students, the program sought to encourage cultural appreciation, showcase local talent, and strengthen community pride through music and performance arts.

In February 2026, the University of the Philippines Diliman presented “Laya’t Kalinga: Mga Himig ng Bayan” at the College of Music Mini Hall as part of the UP Diliman Arts and Culture Festival 2026. Organized by the UPD Office for Initiatives in Culture and the Arts, the UP Voice and Music Theater Guild, and the College of Music, the production featured student performances of Filipino art songs, kundiman, sarswela excerpts, and opera pieces, including Lucio San Pedro’s “Ang Dalaga ng Bayan Ko” and Paulino Cadsawan’s “Kundiman ni Rizal.” The event aimed to celebrate Filipino artistry and promote the cultural significance of traditional Filipino musical forms by highlighting themes of love, identity, nationalism, and community through stage performance.

The concert Mga Awit ng Pag-ibig at Kundiman, was staged at MiraNila, which featured performances by tenor Arthur Espiritu, soprano Stefanie Quintin-Avila, and pianist Najib Ismail, and included interpretations of works such as "Anak Dalita", composed by Francisco Santiago with lyrics by Deogracias Rosario, as well as "Iyo Kailan Pa Man" by Levi Celerio. The event highlighted the continued relevance of kundiman as a musical form associated with themes of romantic longing, nationalism, and cultural memory in contemporary Philippine society.

=== Kundiman global presence ===
On November 8, 2006, Sarah Geronimo, the Philippines' pop princess, staged a concert entitled "The Other Side of Sarah" at the William Cook Auditorium, Anaheim, California, United States. Produced by Viva Entertainment the tour showcased original Filipino music alongside tributes to artists such as Pilita Corrales and Sylvia La Torre. Through performances of classic Filipino songs associated with kundiman and traditional OPM styles, the concert highlighted the continued popularity of Filipino musical traditions among overseas Filipino communities and international audiences.

"Kung Kita'y Kapiling", a classic Filipino kundiman performed by Filipino-American music producer Troy Laureta, was released as a music video on February 9, 2022 as part of Laureta's second Original Pilipino Music (OPM) collection, Giliw. The video featured singer Jake Zyrus and Valentina, and highlighted themes of enduring love and representation, including the portrayal of a transgender man and a non-binary performer. Laureta stated that the project aimed to celebrate kundiman while introducing Filipino music and diverse representation abroad.

On February 14, 2026, the Philippine Embassy in Rome organized the concert “Arias for Eros II: Love Songs from Italy, the Philippines and the World” at the Chancery Hall in Rome as part of the celebration of Philippine National Arts Month. The event featured Filipino baritone Cipriano De Guzman Jr., accompanied by Italian pianist Simone Maria Marziali, who performed a repertoire that included traditional Filipino kundiman songs noted for their emotional themes and association with national identity. Philippine Ambassador Nathaniel Imperial stated that Filipino music serves as a form of cultural expression and diplomacy, while the concert aimed to promote Philippine cultural heritage and strengthen connections between communities through music.

On February 28, 2026, the Philippine Consulate General in Calgary, in collaboration with the UP Alumni Association of Alberta, presented “Isang Gabi ng Kundiman at iba pa” in Calgary to conclude the celebration of Philippine National Arts Month. The concert featured performances of harana and kundiman compositions by Filipino composers such as Nicanor Abelardo, Francisco Santiago, and Constancio de Guzman, while also providing historical discussions on the origins and development of kundiman and harana as traditional Filipino musical forms. Philippine Consul General Emma Sarne stated that kundiman represents not only romantic devotion but also themes of patriotism, longing, and cultural identity, with the event aiming to promote Filipino musical heritage among overseas Filipino communities and international audiences.

On May 29, 2025, the Philippine Consulate General in New York held a Kundiman Masterclass at Kalayaan Hall in the Philippine Center to commemorate National Heritage Month and promote appreciation for kundiman. The event featured Filipina opera singer Evelyn Mandac, the first Filipina to perform major roles at the Metropolitan Opera. Organized as part of ongoing cultural initiatives for Filipino diaspora communities, the program also included a screening of the documentary The Filipina Soprano Who Broke Opera Glass Ceilings and a discussion highlighting Mandac’s international career and the continuing cultural relevance of kundiman.

The concert, titled Del Metro a l'Església (From the Metro Subway to the Church), was held on June 21, 2025 at Iglesia de Santa Ana in Barcelona, Spain that showcased kundiman and other Filipino classical compositions as part of the commemoration of Philippine–Spanish Friendship Day. The performance featured works by Filipino composers including Francisco Santiago, Nicanor Abelardo, and Lucio San Pedro to a predominantly Spanish audience. The event highlighted kundiman as a traditional Filipino musical form and promoted cultural diplomacy by using music to strengthen cultural ties and appreciation between the Philippines and Spain.

On June 7, 2026, in celebration of the 128th Philippine Independence Day outside of the country, Mabuhay, Philippines! was organized by the Philippine Independence Day Council, Inc. (PIDCI) with the support of the Philippine Consulate General in New York, presented the first-ever Filipino cultural showcase in Times Square, in which the musical lineup featured performances by Manhattan School of Music artists presented kundiman selections.
