= Marcelo Adonay =

Filipino church composer

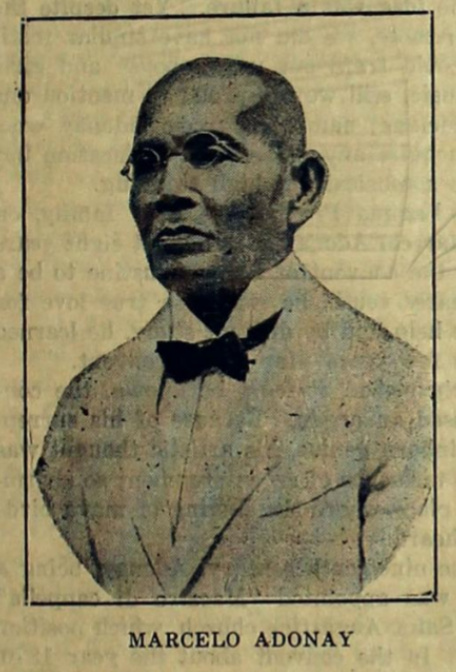
- Adonay in a 1924 book
- Born: February 5, 1848; Pakil, Laguna, Captaincy General of the Philippines, Spanish Empire
- Died: February 8, 1928 (aged 80); Malate, Manila, Insular Government of the Philippine Islands, United States
- Occupations: Composer, Church musician
- Spouse: Maria Vasquez
- Parent: Mariano Adonay (Father) Prudencia Quiteria (Mother)

Marcelo Quiteria Adonay (baptized February 6, 1848 – February 8, 1928) was a Filipino church composer, musician, organist, musical director, and music teacher. He is regarded as a major icon of Philippine golden age of church music for his extensive contribution to religious music in the Philippines throughout his career.

== Early life ==
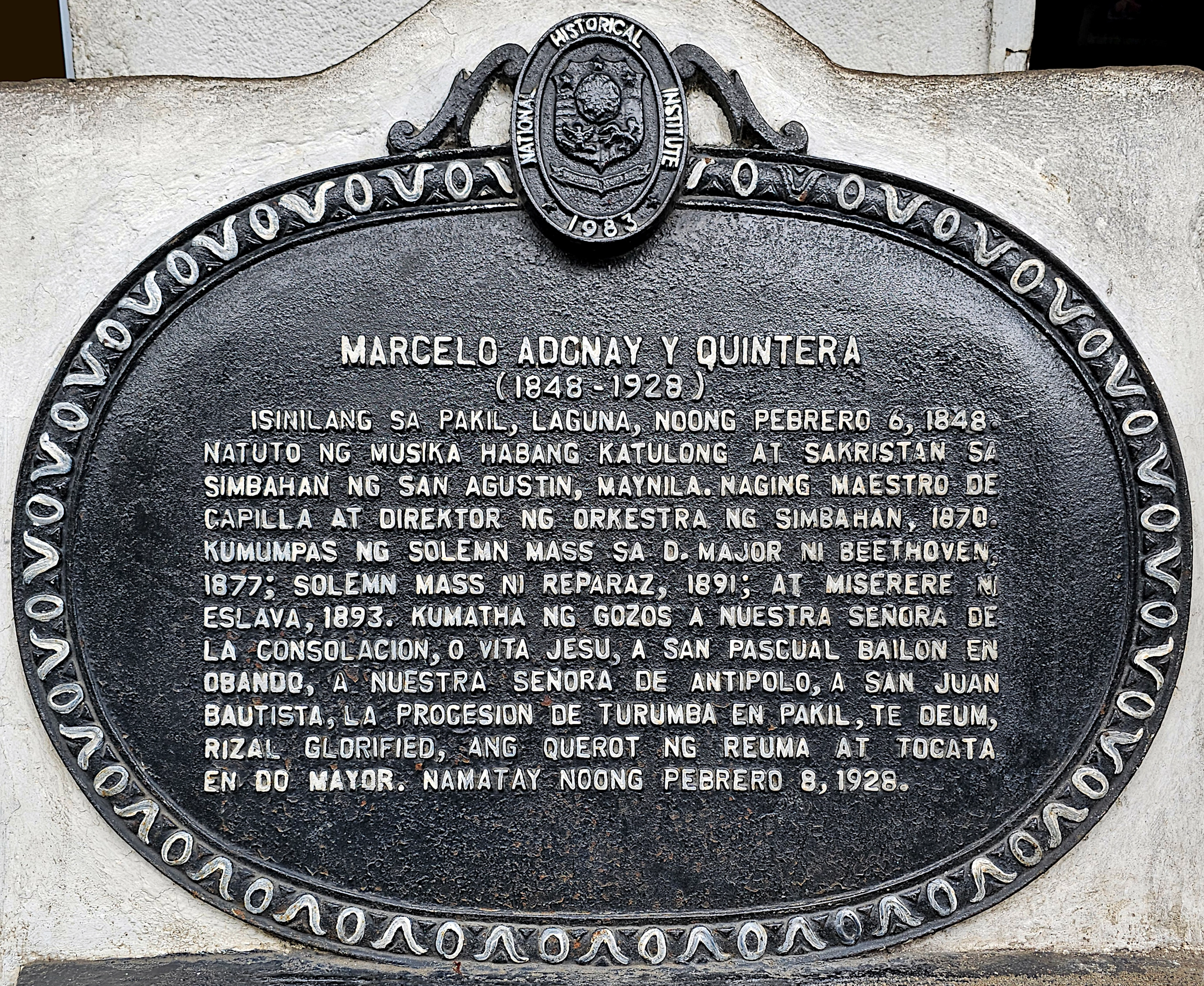
National historical marker installed in Pakil in 1983

Adonay is the eldest of the 11 children born to farmers Mariano Adonay and Prudencia Quiteria in the town of Pakil, Laguna in the Philippines, then under the colonial rule of the Spanish Empire. The exact date of his birth is unknown but official documents indicated his baptismal date to be on February 6, 1848, and has been recognized as his de facto birth date. However, researchers suggested that baptism in the town at that time was generally performed within a day after birth, making February 5, 1848, as his probable date of birth.

His father, aside from being a farmer, also played wind and brass instruments as a member of one of the town bands. Adonay in his early childhood showed enthusiasm for his father's musical instruments. As was the custom for boys during the Spanish colonial times, he was then involved in the ecclesiastical music tradition of his town. In 1856, poverty led his parents to entrust him to the care of Augustinian priests in Intramuros, Manila who discovered his talent for music. In San Agustin Church, he apprenticed as a sacristan and a tiple. Under the friars, he was provided with daily sustenance, proper education, and access to musical environment but was also subjected to strict and harsh discipline.

Adonay has an absolute pitch, and supple, flexible voice which helped his musical learning despite having limited formal music education. His musicality delighted his choirmasters and he rose to the position of primer tiple. He mastered solfeggio, and learned chords, chord positions, and their resolutions on the organ by watching fellow organists. According to oral history, his proficiency in instruments includes the organ, piano, violin, contrabass, flute, and trumpet.

== Career ==
Adonay was already composing music for the use in the liturgy at the age of 21. Samples of his early works such as "Benedictus" and "Libera me, Domine" which were meant for performance at San Agustin were reportedly sent to Spain for expert evaluation. In 1870, Adonay set up Capilla de San Agustin, a 25-piece orchestra meant for masses and for special celebrations. This earned him the title of Maestro di Capella. His leadership was described by all accounts as strict, meticulous, and demanding.

Throughout his career, he had been active in organizing musicians. In 1885, he had been elected record keeper of the newly founded Union Artistico Musical, one of the first organization of professional musicians in the colony. He was a founding member of the Sociedad Musical Filipina de Santa Cecilia, formed in 1888. Other music schools and academies he was involved in organizing includes, the short-lived Centro de Bellas Artes (1902), the Philippine Musical Association (1907), and the Asociacion Musical de Filipinas (1912).

In 1886, Manuel Arostegui a thoroughly trained Spanish church musician arrived in Manila as head of a delegation of Augustinians. He was impressed with Adonay's self-taught mastery of harmony and earlier sent him a book on counterpoint. Adonay observed and assisted Arostegui in all aspect of musical life in church which gave him access to current styles and techniques in European music. Arostegui left the colony and returned to Spain in 1887. With the Capilla de San Agustin, Adonay would then conduct Beethoven's Missa Solemnis on August 28, 1887, which was supposed to be conducted by Arostegui. Under his orchestral leadership are noted musicians Andres Dancel, a violinist, and Antonio Garcia, an organist. The performance was the tour de force of his career and of his subjects. Under Adonay, the Capilla de San Agustin's major performances includes Antonio Reparaz's "Missa a 3 voces" on August 23, 1891, and Hilarion Eslava's "Misa Grande" and Adonay's "Benedictus" in March 1893.

By 1893, Adonay was one of the most prominent and successful native Filipino musicians in Manila. Aside from his church music duties, he also taught and tutored music. Adonay taught music at Colegio de Santa Catalina, Colegio de Santa Rosa, Colegio de San Sebastian, Liceo de Manila and La Campañia de Jesus. One of his students was a prominent businessman and music patron Francisco L. Roxas, who will later on be executed for treason during the Philippine Revolution. He mentored famed composer Francisco Beltran Buencamino Sr. at Liceo de Manila. He also encouraged and recognized the musical talent of noted violinist Ernesto Vallejo, whom Adonay gifted his first violin.

During the Philippine Revolution, Adonay's work "Te Deum", which is meant to be played in a mass of thanksgiving for victory in battle, was first performed on July 7, 1897. A letter written to Emilio Jacinto by a musician named Guillermo Lisboa y Bagayan in Longos on January 15, 1899, mentioned Marcelo Adonay's arrangement of "Marcha Real Filipina" with instruction that it will be played when the Katipunan enters Manila. It was also purported that Adonay composed a march in honor of Antonio Luna.

On June 13, 1900, the San Juan del Monte Orchestra performed his "Adonay's Mass... in honor of San Antonio" at the Quiapo Church. Adonay's "Pequeña Misa Solemne" was first performed on August 28, 1904, at San Agustin Church. From 1908 to 1911, he served as a judge on music competitions for the annual Manila Carnivals. At the funeral of zarzuela and soprano singer Maria Evangelista Carpena on March 8, 1915, he was tasked to conduct "Libera me, Domine". Walter Loving, a Philippine Constabulary bandmaster during the American occupation of the Philippines, requested a composition from Adonay who responded with a Toccata for Organ in C Major.

Adonay's final public performance was a tone poem, "Rizal Glorificado", performed on December 30, 1911, the 15th death anniversary of one of the most celebrated Filipino hero Jose Rizal. The performance was commissioned by the Manila City Government held at the Manila Grand Opera House. In 1914, at the age of 66, Adonay formally retired from San Agustin and handed down his duties to his youngest brother Atanacio.

In his golden wedding anniversary on January 17, 1924, he sponsored a composition competition which was won by a University of the Philippines professor Nicanor Abelardo.

== Personal life ==
On January 17, 1874, Adonay was married at the Manila Cathedral to Maria Vasquez, an orphan from Malolos, Bulacan. He met Vasquez at Beaterio de La Compania de Jesus while serving as a music teacher. Somewhere prior to 1886, he settled in the suburb of Malate along with his wife. The couple reportedly had twelve children which among are Francisco, Marieta, and Liberata, the former died of bronchitis in infancy. His mother Prudencia died on 1877. At the age of 26, Adonay was considered as quite financially well-off and prudent. Even though his father was still alive, he financially supported his younger siblings. Atanacio, one of his siblings, lived in the couple's Malate home nearly all his professional career life and would later on replace his brother as the organist of San Agustin Church upon Adonay's retirement in 1914. His father Mariano died on August 14, 1900.

Adonay's home life was quiet and circumspect. He preferred planting trees and gardening in the afternoon and playing violin or harmonium in the evening with his family. His home altar was framed by a large oil painting of St. Cecilia willed by his student Francisco Roxas after his execution during the Philippine Revolution. In his golden wedding anniversary on January 17, 1924, he sponsored a composition competition which was won by a University of the Philippines professor Nicanor Abelardo.

=== Death ===
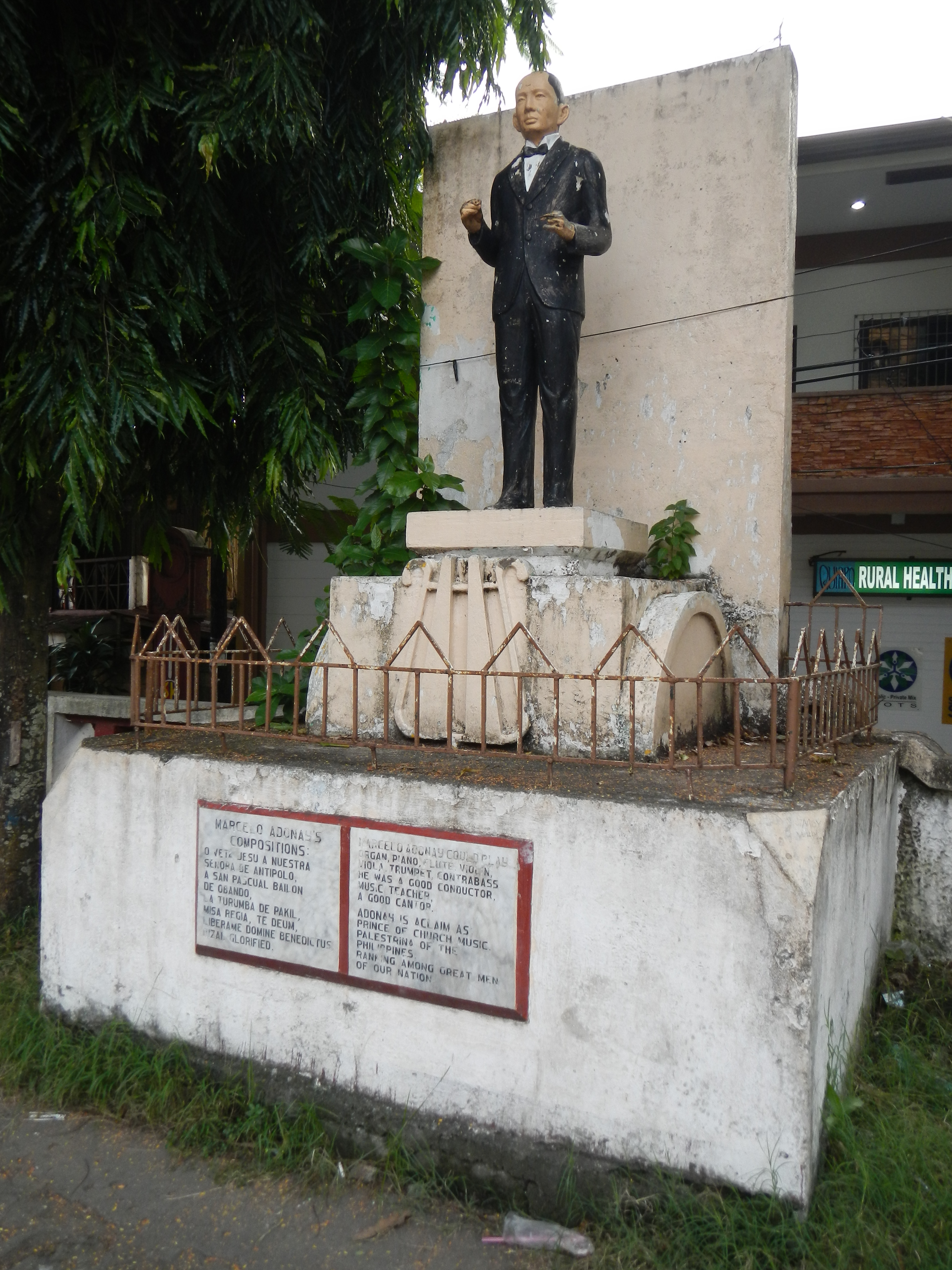
A statue of Marcelo Adonay in Pakil, Laguna

At the age of eighty, Adonay had long been suffering with arthritis which was possibly a result of adult on-set diabetes. His experience with the illness was the inspiration for his humorous 1912 work "Ang Quirot ng Rayuma", for violin, cello, and harmonium. By 1927, Adonay was already mostly confined in bed due to the severity of complications of diabetes. He died on the early morning of February 8, 1928, in his home in Malate. He was buried at the La Loma Catholic cemetery. His wife Maria died months later. The remains of the couple were disinterred from La Loma Cemetery and was reburied in Pakil cemetery. He was survived by his daughter Marieta.

== List of Adonay's Works ==
Date	Title	Status
1894	A San Pascual Bailon de Obando	
1912	Ang Quirot ng Reuma	
1869	Benedictus	
	Dotdot at Kuwit	
	Gozos a la Santísima Virgen a Nuestra Señora de la Consolación	
1921	Himno Pakileño	
1899	Hosana	
	La Julita	
1911	La Procesion de Turumba en Paquil, Laguna	
1869	Libera me, Domine	
1923	Libera me, Domine No. 2	
	Makulit na Pakiusap	
	Marcha Triunfal	
	Meditacion Lugubre No.3	
	Misa de San Antonio	
	Munting Walz	
	Ofertorio De La Misa Santa Ana	
	Pequeña Misa Solemne sobre Motivos de la Missa Regia del Canto Gregoriano	
1911	Rizal Glorificado	
	Rosario Difunto	
	Salve Regina	
	Sempre Unita	
1897	Te Deum	
1921	Toccata in C# Minor	
	Untitled Score in Major D	
	Via Crucis nos. 1-5	
1890s	Villancico a Belen Pastores	

== See also ==
- Church music
- Pakil, Laguna
- San Agustin Church
