= Kapanirong =

In Filipino music, the kapanirong is a serenade (from the root word sirong which means "to go beside a house") by a group of young bachelors who would go to a maiden's house and play their music by the window. The house occupants would then invite the serenaders into the house and in the ensuing merrymaking some courtship could take place among the young. The instrumental ensemble consists of a two-stringed guitar or lute called kotiyapi, a bamboo flute called insi, a bamboo harp called kobing, a two-stringed bamboo tube zither called sirongaganding, and a brass tray called tintik. The kapanirong may or may not have added percussion from the portable gandang drum. Outside of the kapanirong, these instruments can be played separately and individually.

== See also ==
- Harana (serenade)
