= Francisco Santiago =

Filipino composer

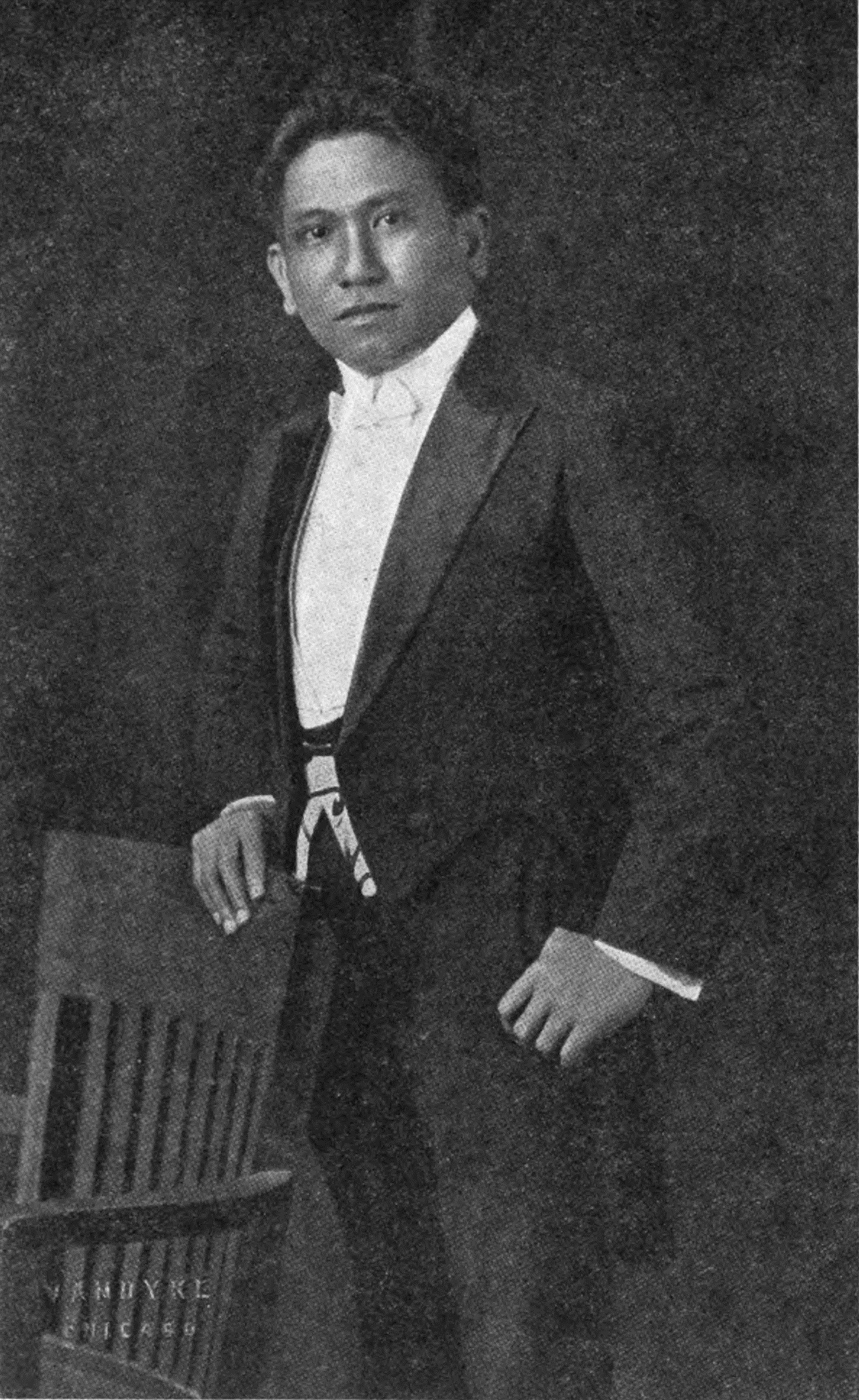
- Francisco Santiago in 1924

Background information
- Born: January 29, 1889; Santa Maria, Bulacan, Bulacan, Captaincy General of the Philippines
- Origin: Philippines
- Died: September 28, 1947 (aged 58) Manila, Philippines
- Genres: Kundiman, Classical Music
- Occupations: Composer, Pianist

Francisco Santiago (January 29, 1889 – September 28, 1947) was a Filipino musician, sometimes called The Father of Kundiman Art Song.

== Life ==
Santiago was born in Santa Maria, Bulacan, Philippines, to musically minded peasant parents, Felipe Santiago and Maria Santiago. In 1908, his first composition, Purita, was dedicated to the first Carnival Queen, Pura Villanueva, who later married the distinguished scholar Teodoro Kalaw.

He studied at the University of the Philippines (UP) Conservatory of Music, in its original campus in Manila, obtaining a degree in Piano in 1921, and a degree in Science and Composition in 1922. He went to the United States to pursue further education. He first obtained his master's degree at the American Conservatory of Music in June 1923, and finally a Doctorate degree at the Chicago Musical School in August 1924. He is the first Filipino musician to attain a doctorate degree.

He became the director of the UP Conservatory of Music in 1930, after the entire music faculty and students of the conservatory protested for the removal of the previous director, Alexander Lippay, for alleged harassment of students and musicians. Santiago is the first Filipino director of the Conservatory.

In 1934, the President of the university, Jorge Bocobo, launched a committee to collect and document folk songs of the Philippines. Francisco Santiago was named the chair of the committee. Part of this committee were dancer Francisca Reyes-Aquino, who notated numerous folk dances and compiling them in several books, and composer Antonino Buenaventura, who transcribed numerous folk music, including those accompanying the dances recorded by Reyes-Aquino.

In 1937-1939 Santiago would compose his masterpiece - the "Taga-ilog" Symphony in D Major. It is one of the first Filipino classical works to feature Philippine instruments such as the gangsa and sulibaw.

=== Plagiarism case ===
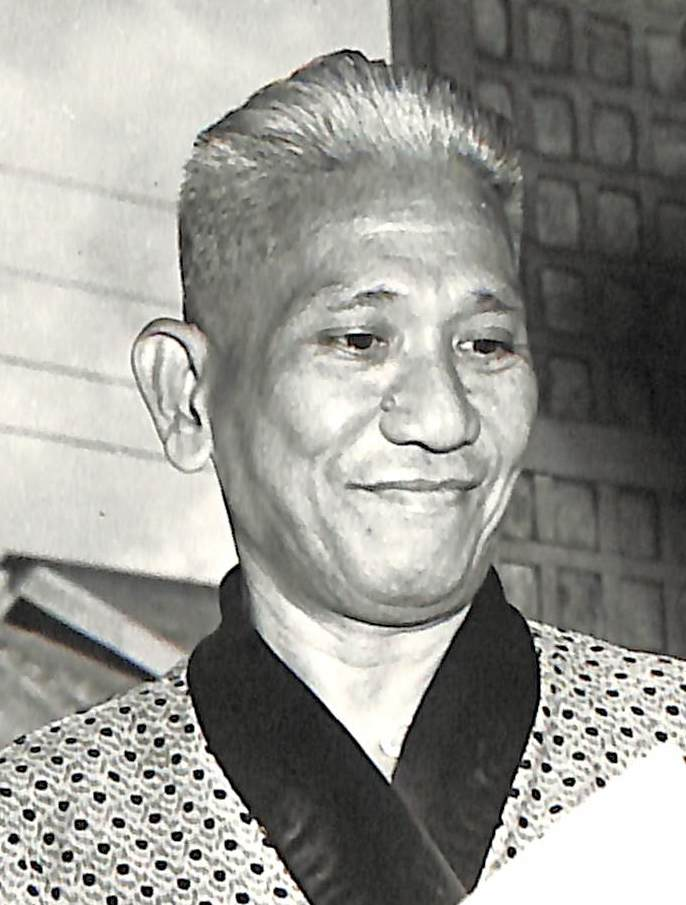
Santiago in 1945

In 1939 he was faced with a plagiarism lawsuit by another Filipino composer Jose Estella. According to Estella, Santiago stole a melody from Estella's 1929 work Campanadas de Gloria and incorporated it in Santiago's 1939 song Ano Kaya ang Kapalaran. However, the investigation found out that both Estella and Santiago's melodies were influenced by the folk song "Leron, Leron Sinta" and that Estella's Campanadas de Gloria also contained several quotations from other composers, therefore breaking Estella's claim. The court decided in favor of Santiago in 1942. He copyrighted 19 works, some of which were transcriptions of Filipino folk songs. The controversy between Santiago and Estella became a national sensation in the Philippines at the time.

=== War years ===
During the Japanese occupation of the Philippines the University of the Philippines was closed down by the invading Japanese forces. In 1942, Francisco Santiago became music director of the newly established New Philippines Symphony Orchestra - created to replace the Manila Symphony Orchestra who refused to play under the Japanese rule. In 1943 he suffered a heart attack and his hand and arm were later paralyzed in an illness.

On February 5, 1945, during the Liberation of Manila, while the family was escaping their neighborhood due to constant bombing, a cart full of Santiago's compositions and manuscripts caught fire near the burning Quiapo Church. The family eventually escaped the shelling, but most of Santiago's compositions were destroyed.

=== Death ===
After the war in 1946, he was named Professor Emeritus by the University of the Philippines. He died one year later on September 28, 1947, and was buried in Manila North Cemetery.

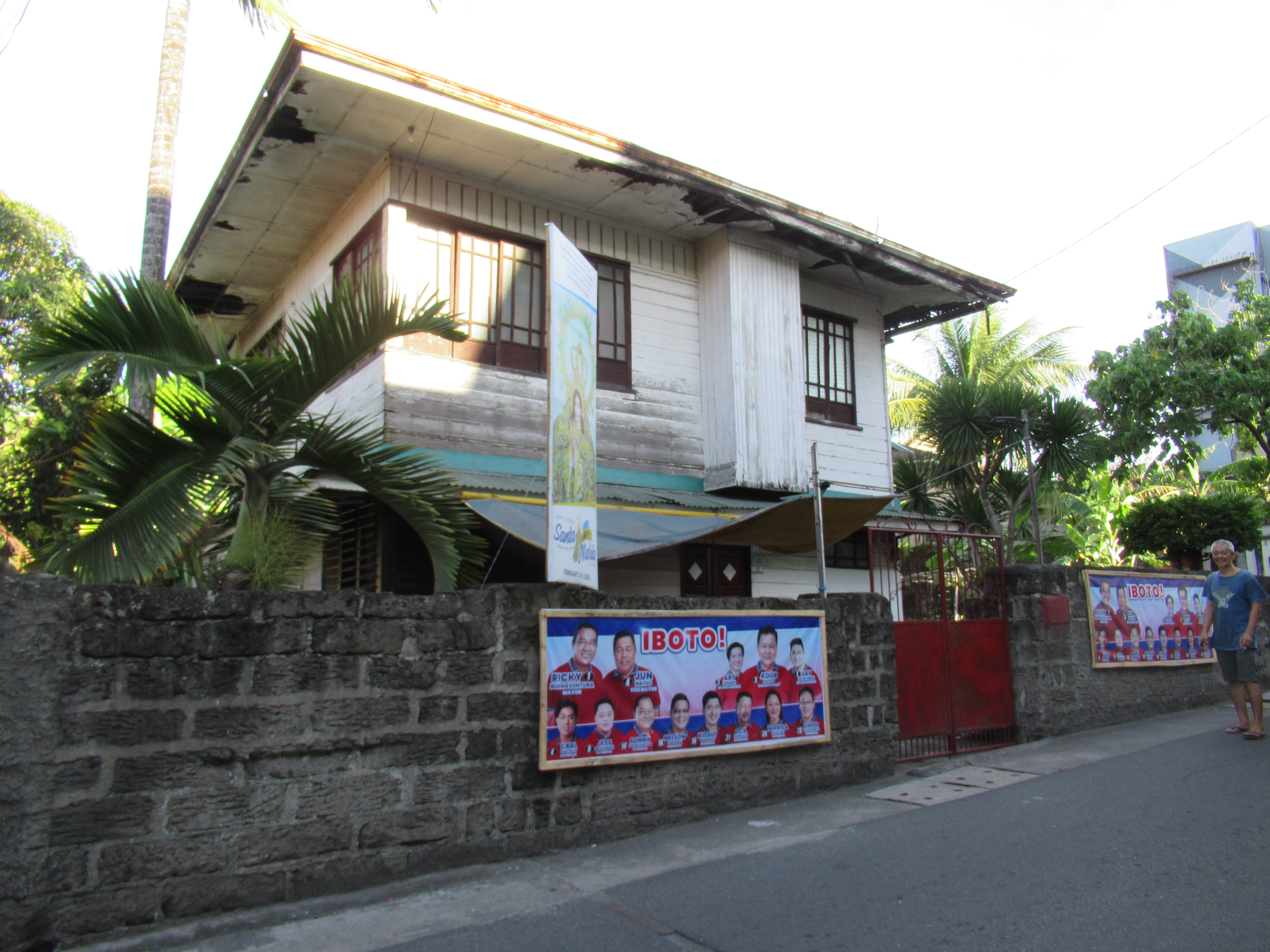
Ancestral house

== Legacy ==
Today, Francisco Santiago is one of the most celebrated Filipino composers today. His kundiman "Anak Dalita" and "Pakiusap" are in the standard repertoire of Filipino singers today. A hall in the Head Office of BDO (formerly the PCIBank Twin Towers, head office of PCIB) was named in his honor as the Francisco Santiago Hall. It was mainly used for kundiman contests of the Makati city government and the awarding of Service Awards of the former Equitable PCI Bank and PCIBank.

Santiago, along with other composers like Nicanor Abelardo and Jose Estella, contributed to the "artsification" of kundiman as a genre.

== Compositions ==
Malayan (Foxtrot)
Composed by Santiago and performed by the Victor Band conducted by Rosario Bourdon. The recording was published under Victor Recording Company in 1920.

E. Arsenio Manuel listed about 156 works by Francisco Santiago. However most of them are either missing or destroyed due to the war. Surviving compositions of Francisco Santiago mostly consist of published songs, piano works, and a few others in manuscript. There are probably more compositions not listed in Manuel's catalog due to them being destroyed during the war. Some of his kundimans/songs are "Sakali Man", "Hibik ng Filipinas", "Pakiusap", "Ang Pag-ibig", "Suyuan", "Alaala Kita", "Ikaw at Ako", "Ano Kaya ang Kapalaran?", "Hatol Hari Kaya?", "Sakali't Mamatay", "Dalit ng Pag-ibig", "Aking Bituin", "Madaling Araw" and "Pagsikat ng Araw".

Santiago, influenced by the American Jazz Age, made his "Filipino fox-trots" such as Balintawak (1920).

His large-scale compositions, such as the Philippine Overture for Orchestra, Sonata Filipina in D-flat for piano, Piano Concerto, and Taga-ilog Symphony were all destroyed.

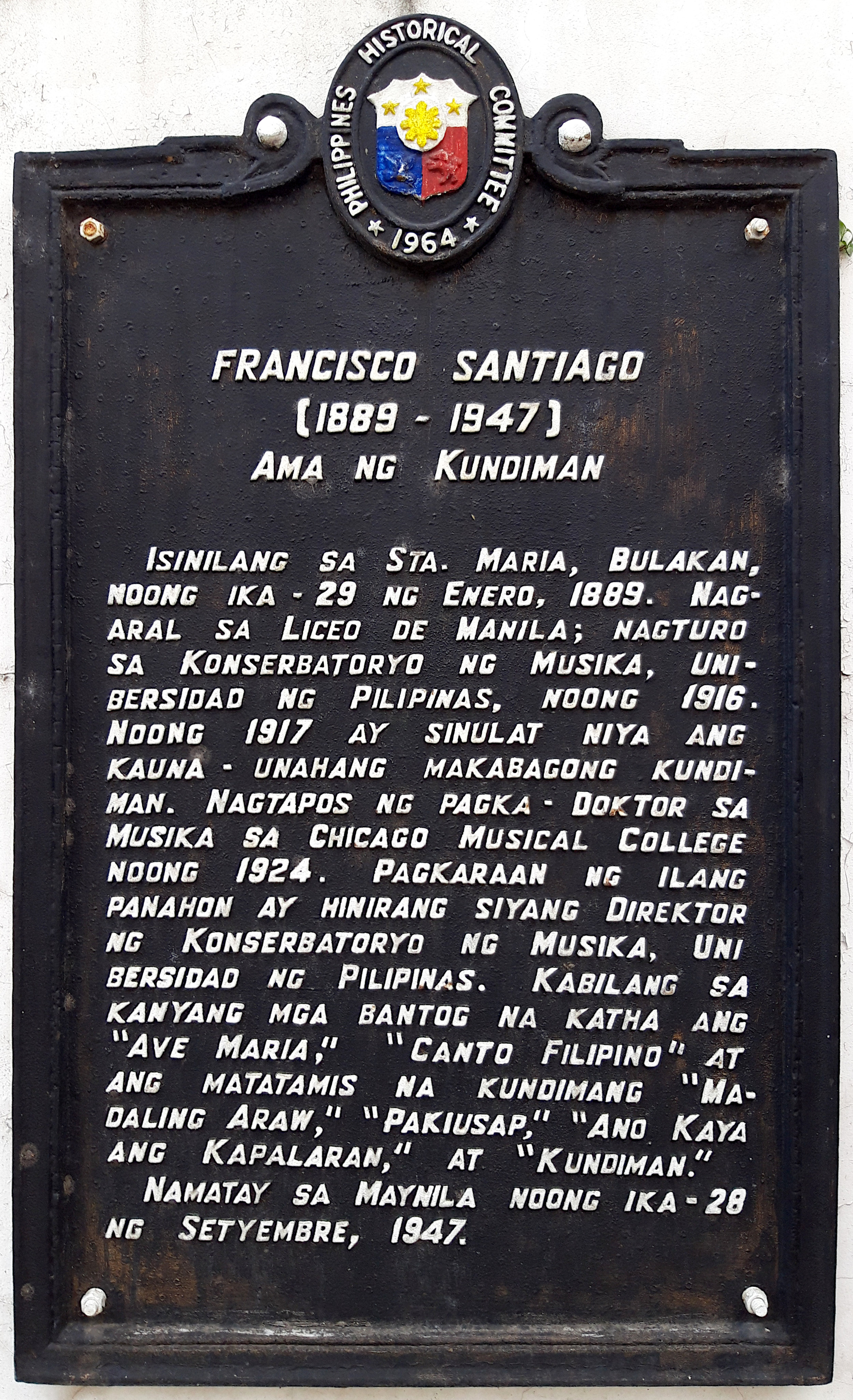
Historical marker created by the Philippines Historical Committee in 1964 to commemorate Santiago at his hometown in Santa Maria, Bulacan

=== Piano Concerto ===
Francisco Santiago's Piano Concerto was considered one of his masterpieces, alongside his Taga-ilog Symphony. The concerto was destroyed during the Liberation of Manila, alongside most of his compositions. However, in 1952, Santiago's former colleagues and students spearheaded by his pupil and pianist Juan C. Bañez reconstructed the Concerto entirely from memory.

== Links ==
- Media related to Francisco Santiago at Wikimedia Commons
- Free scores by Francisco Santiago at the International Music Score Library Project (IMSLP)
