= Carmen Camacho (singer) =

- Born: Carmen Toledo; 23 November 1939 (age 86); Catanduanes, Commonwealth of the Philippines
- Died: October 19, 2025
- Occupation: Singer
- Years active: 1950s-2025
- Label: Villar
- Formerly of: Mabuhay Singers

Carmen Toledo, better known as Carmen Camacho (born 23 November 1939 in Catanduanes, Luzon, Philippines), is one of the Philippine Kundiman Divas of the 1960s along with Norma Ledesma, Norma Balagtas, Pilita Corrales, and others.

Camacho was a member of the Mabuhay Singers in the 1950s. She recorded her first album in the early 1960s, and recorded most of her songs with Villar Records. Camacho continued performing into the 2010s, at which time the Philippine Daily Inquirer called her "the country's top kundiman diva."

== Discography ==
- "Nagkamali Ako" (1966)
- "Kapuspalad ng Isilang" (1967)
- "Katkatawami't Kasta Unay" (1968)
- "Nagpaiten ni Lagip" (1969)
- Dakung Kasalanan (Cebuano) (1968) (Villar MLS 5119)
- Golden Collection Series: The Best of Bicol Folk Songs featuring Pantomina (Bikol) (Digitally Remastered CD Release) (1999) (Mayon/Alpha ARCD-99-8150)
