= Ruben Tagalog =

Filipino actor and musician

- Born: October 17, 1922; La Paz, Iloilo City, Philippines
- Origin: Philippines
- Died: March 5, 1985 (aged 62)
- Genres: Kundiman, folk
- Occupations: Actor, singer
- Instruments: Vocals, guitar

Ruben Tagalog (October 17, 1922 – March 5, 1985) was a Filipino actor and musician, famous for his works in the kundiman style. He was also one of the founders of the singing group Mabuhay Singers. He is known as the "Father of Kundiman". He was a member of the US Army during the Japanese occupation of the Philippines.

== Later career ==
He first caught the attention of radio listeners in the 1940s when he hosted his own radio program, Harana ni Ruben Tagalog. His baritone voice filled his songs "Ramona", "O Ilaw", "Sayang", "Azucena", and "Nasaan Ka Ngayon" with emotion. He revived danzas and balitaws like "Nahan Kaya Ikaw", "Bakit Ka Lumuluha", "Barong Tagalog", "Dalagang Pilipina", and "Caprichosa". He was the first artist to record "Bayan Ko" and "Ang Pasko ay Sumapit". Tagalog is also known for harana or serenade songs such as "Dungawin Mo, Hirang" and "Kay Lungkot Nitong Hatinggabi".

In spite of his last name being "Tagalog", he was born in the city of Iloilo in the Visayas and thus was a speaker of Hiligaynon or Ilonggo. He released at least two albums in the Cebuano language: Ruben Tagalog Sings Visayan Songs and a duet album with Cebuana singer Nora Hermosa called Duet in Visayan.

In the early 1950s, he became the first to popularise the Tagalog version of the 1933 Visayan Christmas carol "Kasadya Ning Taknaa" as "Ang Pasko ay Sumapit". The Tagalog lyrics were written by Levi Celerio. He is also known for performing "Panahon 'tang Nagdaan", a kundiman composed by Ambrosio del Rosario.

== Death ==
He died on March 5, 1985, in Orange County, California. He is laid to rest at Forest Lawn Memorial in California.

== Legacy ==
After his death, he came to be known as the Philippines' "Father of Kundiman" or Hari ng Kundiman (King of Kundiman) and the "King of Ballads".

His posthumous songs were featured on Yesterday and Remember When on DZMM every Sunday, and also featured on Moonlight Serenade on weekday mornings on DZMM.

The DWIZ882 radio show Bella Filipina (heard every Sunday evening) honored Ruben Tagalog's centennial for the entire month of October 2022, and continues to air his recordings of balitaws, danzas and novelties.

== Filmography ==
=== Film ===
Year	Title	Director	Production Company
1955	Sintu-Sinto	Artemio B. Tecson	Deegar Pictures, Freedom Pictures

== Discography ==
Ruben Tagalog – Alang-Alang Sa Pagibig Ruben Tagalog - Alang-Alang Sa Pagibig album cover More images

Label: Villar – MLS-5118, Villar – MLS 5118 Format: Vinyl, LP, Stereo Country: Philippines Released: Genre:Pop Style:Ballad A1 Alang-Alang Sa Pagibig Written By – R. Tagalog A2 Di Ka Maglalaho Written By – A. Torres A3 Nababatid Ko Written By – T. Salcedo-S. Ramos A4 Kung Malaya Lang Ako Written By – P. Vergara A5 Inaamin Ko Ng Lahat Written By – T. Salcedo-L. Celerio A6 Patawarin Mo Lamang Written By – A. Torres B1 Napanaginip Ko Written By – R. Tagalog B2 Ako'y May Alinlangan Written By – A. Torres-R. Tagalog B3 Makasalanan Written By – F. Buencamino, Jr.-L. Celerio

== Awards ==
Year	Award giving body	Category	Nominated work	Results
1969	Awit Awards	Male Recording Artist of the Year	—N/a	Won
