= Mabuhay Singers =

Philippine group of singers

The Mabuhay Singers were a group of singers from the Philippines that was formed in 1958. Some members went on to become soloists including Cely Bautista, Raye Lucero, Naning Alba, and the late Rene Evangelista, among many others.

The group was formed by the Villar Recording Company as a merged group from two vocal trios, namely Tres Rosas, composed of Carmen Camacho, Nora Hermosa, and Raye Lucero; and the Lovers Trio, composed of Chi Lucero, Floro San Juan, and Ador Torres. Filipino singers like Ruben Tagalog, Cely Bautista, Ric Manrique, Jr., Rita Rivera, Don David, Flor Ocampo, Noel Samonte, Betty Rivera, Phil Llamas, Robert Malaga, and Everlita Rivera joined the group briefly.

The Mabuhay Singers recorded more than 100 albums; some were released internationally. The albums contained traditional and modern Filipino music in major languages of the Philippines, and some songs in English and Spanish. In 1973, the Philippine Records Association awarded a citation for the group for their best-selling albums. The Christmas song "Mano Po Ninong! Mano Po Ninang!", co-written by Torres, was originally recorded by the group.

== Discography ==
- Halina't Umawit (1962)
- Maligayang Araw (1963)
- Bakasyon (1968)
- Mabuhay Singers Sings Pandangguhan, Dahil sa Iyo and Other Philippine Songs (1968)
- Perlas ng Silangan (1971)
- Sariling Awit (1971)
- Kami Po'y Paskuhan (1973)
- Lubi-Lubi & Other Waray Folksongs (1973)

== Awards ==
Year	Award giving body	Category	Nominated work	Results
1969	Awit Awards	Vocal Group of the Year	—N/a	Won
1969	Awit Awards	Album of the Year	"Mabuhay Singers Sing Pandangguhan, Dahil sa Iyo and other Philippine Songs"	Won
