= Leron, Leron Sinta =

Philippine folk song

- English: Leron, Leron, my love
- Style: Folk song
- Language: Filipino
- Duration: 2 minutes and 3 seconds

Leron, Leron Sinta, also called Leron with the Papaya, is a folk song from the Philippines.

== Meaning and popularity ==
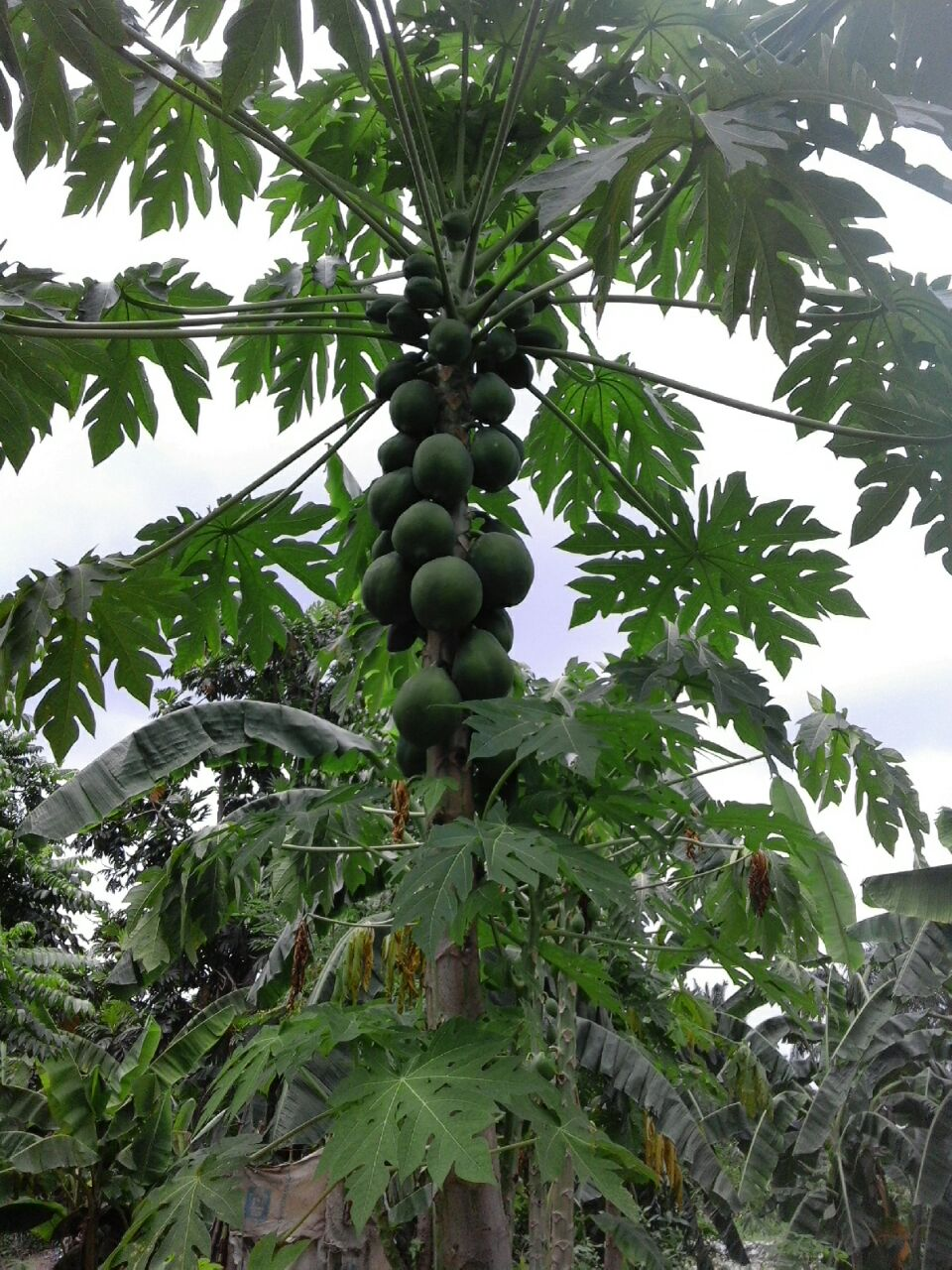
A picture of a papaya tree.

The song is about a man trying to get a Papaya sprout, eventually falling. The woman tries to find someone else to get the papaya sprout, but the man eventually convinces her to let him get the papaya sprout, stating “Love me, I’m a brave man. I have nine large knives and seven guns. I’m going to walk to that table. A plate of stir-fried noodles is my foe!”. The origin was unclear, but the song was originally sung in the provinces during the papaya harvest season, due to its connection to papaya farming, the song eventually became popular among the Filipinos.

== In popular culture ==
In 1964, Leron, Leron Sinta was included in a collection of Filipino Folk Songs by Emilia Cavan. On January 9, 2024, A Swedish Choir gained international popularity by singing their rendition of Leron, Leron Sinta, they also won an award from a European Choir competition.

== Other versions ==
There is a version sung by Filipino musician Luz Morales, which switches the main character with a boy.
