= Harana (serenade) =

Filipino tradition of serenading

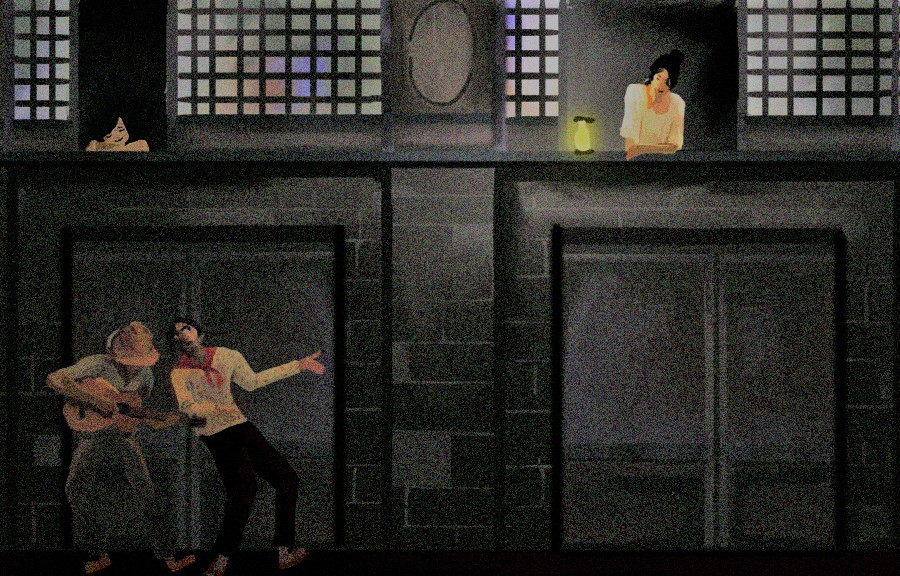
Harana

The harana (Spanish: Jarana) is a serenade tradition in rural areas of the Philippines in which young men may formally meet single lady visitors. Harana is composed of the orality of indigenous poetry intertwined with some Spanish musicality, with the intent of uplifting women and painting them in an angelic and beloved light. ln harana, the songs that are usually sung are Kundiman or dansas.

== Form ==
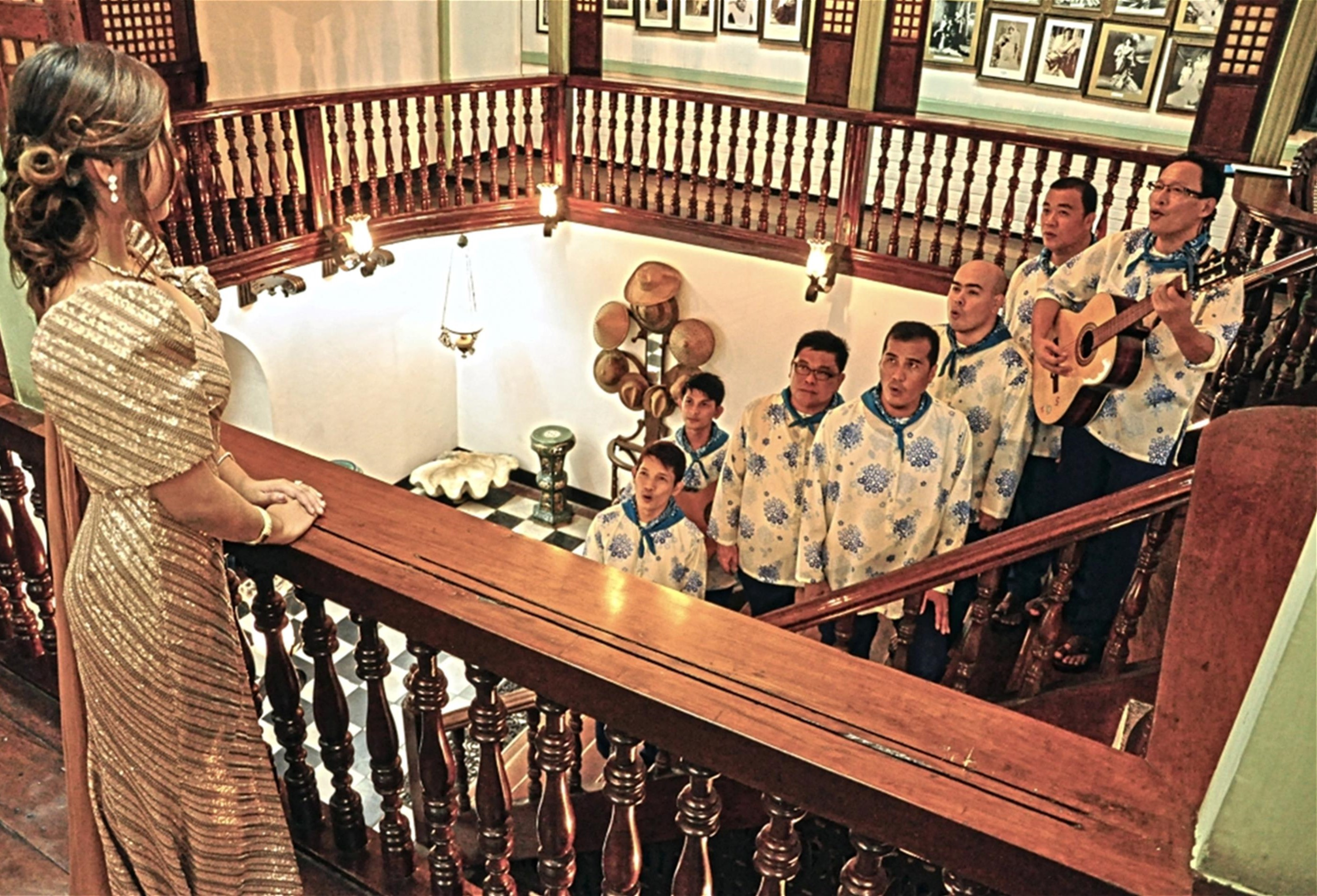
Sometimes traditionally done with friends or with musicians

Harana is widely practiced in many parts of the Philippines with a set of protocols, a code of conduct, and a specific style of music. The formula of Harana follows three parts: pagatawag (to call out), pagtug-an or pagsugid (to confess), and finally pagtubag (to reply). Traditionally, the suitor or manliligaw will visit the house of the girl he is trying to woo, and sing by her window until she comes out to either accept or deny him. Such, is the act of pagatawag. The suitor may or may not be accompanied, but usually his companions will be playing a guitar or provide back up vocals as he sings (pagtug-an or pagsugid). Ideally, the dalaga or young lass will choose to accept him in her act of pagtubag. If serenaders are successful, the house's family may feel inclined to invite them in for food and drink. More often than not, the serenaded and their families show little interest in the serenader, with some going to the extent of vocally voicing their disapproval. Regardless of result, the serenaded often becomes the subject of teasing among members of their close community.

== History ==
The harana first gained popularity in the early part of the Spanish Philippines period. Its influence comes from folk Music of Spain and the mariachi sounds of Mexico. It more specifically comes from the Mexican tradition of serenading the Virgin of Guadalupe, annually on the sunrise of every December 12. It is a traditional form of courtship in which a man woos a woman by singing underneath her window at night. A historical example of this presents itself in medieval knights' courtship to pure, young maidens in towers in the 19th century with the intention of displaying his admiration for her. This tradition, essential to courtship, is a cultural combination of pre-existing indigenous Filipino traditions and influence from Spanish colonization in addition to core traits found in Filipino hospitality. Harana itself uses mainly Hispanic protocols in music, although its origins lie in the old pre-colonial Philippine musical styles which is still practiced around the country (See also Kapanirong style of the Maguindanao people of Mindanao).

A decline in the practice of harana has been observed since the 1980s. A few factors have contributed to this. The wider spread of electricity across Filipino households has allowed people greater access to new music like disco and overarching favorability to western influences in media, overshadowing traditional music. Martial law in the Philippines additionally imposed curfews that discouraged the traditionally nightly courtship traditions of harana. As a result of these hinderances, the practice of harana and other local traditions have been allocated to school or cultural program performances.

== Music ==
Harana's love songs are commonly sung in a major key and rhythmically performed in a 2/4 or 4/4 time signature; inspired by habanera. The music is rich with lyrical elements that showcase the depth of raw sentiment the courter feels for the suitor. Lyricism within harana is written conversationally in present tense, with the courter imploring the suitor for a reciprocated love and desire. In Yogad culture, the most popular folk songs fall under the category of love and courtship. Lyrics commonly embody and praise the sanctity of women and compare them to qualities that promote a more fulfilling life. Songs like "Yu Lappao" (The Flower) directly compares the woman being courted, and her features, to the loveliness and healing properties of a flower; going as far as to proclaim that the woman would be the sole cure to the man's fatal wound. On a melancholic note, songs like "O, Bulan" (Oh, Moon) portray the haranista praying to the moon for guidance and deeming their fears of losing their loved one worse than being claimed by death.

=== Accompaniment ===
The word harana has derived from the Spanish string instrument Jarana. The main accompanying instrument used for harana is the guitar, which is played by the courter. It resembles a guitar, but is smaller in nature.The guitar commonly introduces each song and its tone in an instrumental solo and often has an interlude between the second and third verse. However, other string instruments such as the ukulele and, less frequently, the violin and trumpets are also used.

=== Notable Haranistas ===
Known as the "Visayan Harana King," Inastacio "Stax" Huguete rose to fame as a well known haranista in the 1950s that popularized many Cebuano songs such as "Bisan sa Damgo Lang"m "Patay'ng Buhi" and "Dahong Laya".
