= Antonio Molina (composer) =

Filipino musician (1894–1980)

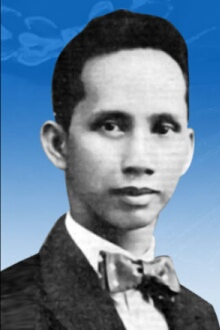
- Antonio Molina from the Order of National Artists (NCCA)
- Born: Antonio Jesús Naguiat Molina; December 26, 1894; Quiapo, Manila, Captaincy General of the Philippines
- Died: January 29, 1980 (aged 85); Republic of the Philippines
- Occupations: Composer, conductor and music administrator
- Known for: Ana Maria, Hatinggabi
- Awards: Order of National Artists of the Philippines

Antonio Jesús Naguiat Molina (December 26, 1894 – January 29, 1980) was a Filipino composer, conductor and music administrator. He was named a National Artist of the Philippines for his services to music. He was also known as the "Claude Debussy" of the Philippines due to his use of impressionist themes in music.

As a pioneer of the Philippine classical music scene, he led the first nationalistic movement in Philippine music.

== Early life ==
Molina was born on December 26, 1894, in Quiapo, Manila, the son of Juan Molina, a government official, who founded the Molina Orchestra. In 1902, he attended the Escuela Catolica de Nuestro Padre Jesus Nazareno in Quiapo, Manila, and college at San Juan De Letran where he was awarded a Bachelor of Arts degree in 1909.

Molina's exposure to music at a young age laid him the foundation to become a composer and musician. At an early age, he mastered playing the violoncello which led to his performance as an orchestra soloist at the Manila Grand Opera House. Besides mastering the violoncello, he also explored other Western and indigenous instruments.

== Musical career ==
Molina made his first composition in 1912 titled Matinal, which is preserved in an unpublished volume called Miniaturas, Vol. 1. He was appointed to teach harmony, composition, music history, and violoncello at the University of the Philippines Conservatory of Music, pursuing a career in music education until being appointed dean of the Centro Escolar Conservatory of Music. He founded the Centro Escolar University String Quartet, which was professionally organized and financed by its music school.

As a composer, Molina is credited with over 500 compositions. Not only that, he also taught musical composers such as Felipe Padilla de Leon and Lucresia Kasilag, who would later become Philippine National Artists themselves.

He also formed a number of rondalla groups in Manila. One of these were the Rondalla Ideal which was founded and directed from 1909 to 1912 and the Rondalla Filharmonica Juvenal which was organized in 1913. According to Molina, Filipino folk music and classical music at the time was in demand specially among the crew of American shipping companies.

Molina was the first Filipino composer whose choral concert was televised in 1953.

== Musical style ==
Molina was known to experiment with new ideas and innovate his own unique style of music. He infused Eastern modality with Western harmony and combined ethnic and native instruments with Western instruments.

=== Influences ===
Molina stated in his interview conducted by Helen F. Samson that his music was usually inspired by literature, with his favorite being La Novia Muerta by Ruben Daria. His compositions such as his piano pieces like "Camia" (1942), "Malikmata" (1939), and "Mamer (Cradle Song)" (1960) were regarded as "literary interpretations".

== Death and legacy ==
Molina died, aged 85, on January 29, 1980; a result of heart failure.

According to the Philippine National Commission for Culture and the Arts, Molina is credited for introducing the whole tone scale, linear counterpoint, pentatonic scale, dominant ninths, and eleventh chords, especially in local Filipino music.
