= Chino Toledo =

Filipino composer and conductor

Josefino "Chino" Toledo
- Born: Josefino Javier Toledo; March 6, 1959 (age 66); Quezon City, Philippines
- Occupations: composer, conductor, music teacher
- Website: https://www.chinotoledo.com/

Josefino "Chino" Javier Toledo (born March 6, 1959) is a Filipino composer and conductor.

== Biography ==
=== Early life ===
Josefino Toledo is born on March 6, 1959, to Victor Toledo and Lolita Javier. Born to a musical family, his father Victor was the founder and directors of Pangkat Kawayan, a musical ensemble of bamboo instruments played by elementary school students. It was his father who first taught him the rudiments of music. He likewise played in his father's ensemble during his childhood days, playing the marimba and xylophone.

=== Education ===
His first formal music studies was at the Laperal Music Academy which he simultaneously took alongside his high school education at the Far Eastern University. He enrolled at the University of the Philippines College of Music, graduating with a Bachelor's of Music in Composition in 1979. His teachers at the conservatory include the national artists Lucio San Pedro, Ramon Santos, and Jose Maceda. From 1983 to 1985, he took further studies at the Conservatoire National Superieur de Musique in Paris through a grant by the French government. A rockefeller grant enabled him to pursue graduate studies at the Cleveland Institute of Music, graduating in 1986.

=== Career ===
After he graduated at the UP College of Music in 1979 he became the principal percussionist of the Manila Symphony Orchestra. At the same time he taught percussion and composition in his alma mater the UP College of Music. He also taught at the University of Santo Tomas Conservatory of Music until 1983.

He eventually became the music director and conductor of the Manila Symphony Orchestra from 1985 to 1987, as well as guest conductor of the Philippine Philharmonic Orchestra on several occasions in the 1990s and 2000s.

In 1991, he was the musical arranger and music director for the zarzuela revivals of the Cultural Center of the Philippines' Tanghalang Pilipino. Under this institution, he arranged the music and recorded several Filipino zarzuelas such as Walang Sugat, Dalagang Bukid, and Paglipas ng Dilim under the CCP Sarswela Series.

In the 2000s, he maintained his faculty position as chair of the Composition and Theory department at the UP College of Music, eventually obtaining the title of full professor. He was also the executive director of the Miriam College Center for Applied Music. In 2000, he founded the Metro Manila Concert Orchestra, serving as its music director until 2016.

In 2016, he became the founding director and conductor of the University of the Philippines Symphony Orchestra. In 2022, he was bestowed the title of professor emeritus by the UP Board of Regents.

== Personal life ==
Chino Toledo is currently married and has two children.

== Compositions ==
Chino Toledo's compositions are in the avant-garde style. His music is characterized by its "fusion of contemporary western language and Southeast Asian aesthetics". His first commissioned work, Angklungan, written in 1976 when he was 17 while studying at the UP College of Music already showed the influences of his composition teachers, particularly of Jose Maceda. Toledo's catalog of works includes music for theater, films, scoring libraries, orchestrations and arrangement for different performing forces, and revisions and edition of Philippine sarsuwelas.

The following is a selection of his compositions:

=== Arrangements for Philippine Zarzuelas ===
- Walang Sugat by Severino Reyes (libretto) and Fulgencio Tolentino (music)
- Paglipas ng Dilim by Precioso Palma (libretto) and Leon Ignacio (music)
- Bunganga ng Pating by Julian Balmaceda (libretto) and Leon Ignacio (music)
- Pilipinas Circa 1907 by Nicanor Tiongson (libretto and music)
- Bayan, Isang paa na Lamang by Melba Padilla Maggay (libretto) and Lucio San Pedro (music)

=== Operas ===
- San Andres B (Opera in 2 acts) Libretto by Virgilio Almario (2013)

=== Film ===
- Emir (2010)

=== Works with Orchestra ===
- Dalawang Ug-og (for Orchestra) (1986)
- Kulambo: Isang Kayumangging Puntod (for choir and orchestra) (1986)
- Trenodya Ke Lean at sa Mga Pinaslang, Pinapaslang at Papaslanging Pa Dahil sa Walang Hanggang Kadahilanan, no. 6 (for Orchestra) (1990)
- Kantus: Tagabawa (for Orchestra) (1999)
- Ekontra: Kongruo: Iunktum (for Piano and Orchestra) (2007)
- Hoy! Bata (for soprano and orchestra) (2017)
- Filipino Komiks (3 act-ballet)

=== Choral Works ===
- Misa Lingua Sama-Sama (2015) for choir and 4 percussions

=== Chamber works ===
- Trenodya Ke Lean at sa Mga Pinaslang, Pinapaslang at Papaslanging Pa Dahil sa Walang Hanggang Kadahilanan, no. 4 (for Flute and Piano) (1988)
- Auit (for 12 voices, guitar, and 2 percussions) (1997)
- Salita-an (for guitar, viola, cello, and guitar) (1997)
- Dingging: Maging Ang Mga Kwerdas Ay Sumasamo ng Kapayapaan (for rondalla, voces and percussions)
- Hoy! for Trombone and Percussion (2004)
- Mga Sulyap Sa Simbahan ng Quiapo Mula sa Kalye Echague (for chamber orchestra) (2012)
- Agos, for narrator and chamber ensemble (2017)
- Tangis (Lament) for Erhu and String Quartet (2019)

=== Solo Instrumental Works ===
- At Maging ang Kwerdas ay Humihingi ng Kapayapaan Para sa Mundo (for solo violin) (1990)
- Kwaderno for Solo Guitar (2000)
- Koleksyon: Images for Piano (2004)

== Awards ==
- Kucyna International Composition Prize Finalist ALEA Boston (1985)
- American Society of Composers and Publisher-Raymund Hubbel Award in Composition (1986)
- The Outstanding Young Men (T.O.Y.M). Award (1997)
- International Award for the Arts, U.P. (2000)
- Civitella Ranieri International Fellowship Award in Arts, Italy / New York (2004)
- Movie Musical Scorer of the Year (EMIR) 27th PMPC Star Award for Movies (2011)
- Best Musical Scorer (EMIR) – Golden Screen Award Entertainment Press Society of the Philippines (2011)
- Outstanding Alumni Award, Far Eastern University (2013)
- Outstanding Original Musical Composition for opera SAN ANDRES B 6th Gawad Buhay - Philstage Award (2014)
- Bayani ng Malolos Award, Arts (2017)
- Ulirang Ama Award - Ulirang Ina Ama Awards Foundation Inc. (2018)
- U.P. Diliman Centennial Professorial Chair 2014; 2020
- SUDI 2021 National Music Award - National Commission for Culture and the Arts (2020)
- Lifetime Distinguished Achievement Award - UP Alumni Association (2022)
- Best Musical Direction for “ANAK DATU” 35th Aliw Award (2023)
