= Zorilla (disambiguation) =

Zorilla is a striped polecat

Zorilla may also refer to:

- Ben Zobrist (born 1981), nicknamed Zorilla

== See also ==
- Zorrilla, a given name and surname (including a list of people)
- Zorrilla Theatre, in Tagalog, was a prominent theater in the Philippines
