= Ang Maya =

1908 Filipino Kundiman

"Ang Maya (The Sparrow)"
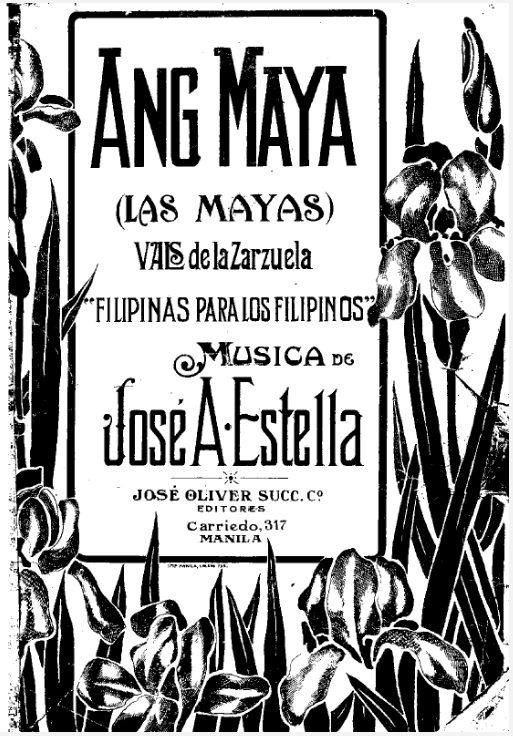
- Music sheet cover of Ang Maya

Single by Maria Carpena
- Language: Filipino
- Released: 1908
- Genre: Ballad; Kundiman; Sarswela
- Length: 3:13
- Label: Victor Talking Machine Company
- Composer: Jose Estella
- Lyricist: Severino Reyes

Audio sample
- Maria Carpena, 1908 (03:13): file; help

"Ang Maya" (Tagalog pronunciation: [aŋ ˈmaja]; 'The Sparrow') is a 1908 Filipino song composed by Jose Estella with lyrics by dramatist Severino Reyes under the American label Victor Talking Machine Company.

== Background ==
"Ang Maya" was one of the songs written for the zarzuela "Filipinos para los Filipinos" by Estella and Reyes. According to contemporary accounts, the composition was inspired by a sparrow that flew near Reyes’s summer hut.

In the Philippines, the maya refers to a folk term for various small, common birds—mainly sparrows, munias, and finches. It is most closely associated with the Chestnut Munia (or mayang pula), which was the country's national bird until 1995. Today, city dwellers often use "maya" to describe the Eurasian Tree Sparrow (mayang simbahan).

The choice of the maya, associated with the Philippine countryside, was deliberate and reflected Reyes’s interest in portraying ordinary Filipino life in artistic works. By centering the song on a familiar element of the local landscape, Estella presented everyday rural imagery within the context of an art song intended for theatrical performance.

One interpretation of the lyrics is an allusion to freedom from the colonizer Another interpretation construed the song as a political satire against a proposed American bill forbidding Filipino men from marrying American women, a double standard that reflected broader colonial hierarchies.

== The singer ==
Maria Carpena was recognized for her singing talent at an early age and, by the age of 15, had already gained attention for her vocal ability despite no professional music training and opposition from her father, who reportedly discouraged her from performing onstage. She later moved to Manila, where she stayed at a beaterio at the Colegio de Santa Rosa in Intramuros while supporting herself through household work and embroidery. In 1901, Carpena made her stage debut in a benefit concert at the Zorilla Theater, where her performance received public acclaim. Her career advanced further in 1902 when she was discovered by Severino Reyes, director of the Gran Compañía de Zarzuela Tagala.

In 1908, after an invitation from then-Governor General William Howard Taft, she traveled to the United States. Accompanied by the Molina Orchestra, Carpena recorded several tracks for Victor Talking Machine Company, including "Ang Maya", making her the first Filipino recording artist.

== Release ==
The recording history of "Ang Maya" has been the subject of historical debate due to conflicting accounts regarding when, where, and how the song was first recorded. One account holds that the recordings were made in a room at the newly completed Manila Hotel using a portable Victrola recording machine, supervised by Major William Hart Anderson, who was not a musician. However, some historians consider this unlikely, noting that the Victor Talking Machine Company maintained strict technical standards for its recordings.

By 1913, Anderson was associated with Erlanger and Galinger, the principal Philippine distributor of Victor playback machines, while businessman Isaac Beck represented the competing Odeon Records label. A second theory suggests that if recordings of Carpena, including “Ang Maya,” were made acoustically in Manila, they may later have been reissued by Victor in the 1920s for distribution in the Philippines. This interpretation is partly based on the inclusion of Carpena in Richard Spottswood’s catalogue of ethnic recordings, where her entries are dated to the 1920s but marked with uncertainty.

A copy of the original recording of “Ang Maya” was obtained by Antonia Tiongco from the Filipinas Heritage Library of the Ayala Foundation in Makati.

== Versions ==
The piece, famously recorded by Maria Carpena, was established as a standard for coloratura sopranos due to its waltz tempo and demanding vocal style, paving the way for future performers.

Legendary Filipino soprano Conching Rosal recorded the definitive studio version of "Ang Maya". It was the title track of her celebrated album released by Villar Records in 1962.

== Performances ==
During the Philippine Philharmonic Orchestra's (PPO) 2005 concert titled "Picturesque Philippines," held under the auspices of the Cultural Center of the Philippines, a notable performance featured the PPO with vocalist Joan Cano as the featured soloist. The inclusion of the song served as a key highlight of the concert's broader objective to showcase traditional Filipino art songs and nationalistic orchestral suites.

In 2014, the University of the Philippines Madrigal Singers performed “Ang Maya” at the Abelardo Hall Auditorium in Quezon City during the "Panorama" Faculty Concert Series. The performance featured a choral arrangement by composer Chris Borela and was presented under the direction of choirmaster Mark Carpio.

In 2019, the Cultural Center of the Philippines featured the composition during its 50th Anniversary Gala Concert, where it was presented as a collaborative waltz performance. The piece was performed by Bayanihan, the Bayanihan Rondalla, the Philippine Madrigal Singers, and the Madz Et Al choirs in a combined interpretation that incorporated dance, choral, and rondalla elements.

During the "Gitara't Awit" benefit concert held on June 22, 2023, at the Y Space of the Yuchengco Museum in Makati City, soprano Stefanie Quintin and the PIMA Guitar Quartet performed a classical arrangement of "Ang Maya".
