= Jose Estella =

Filipino composer and conductor (1870–1943)

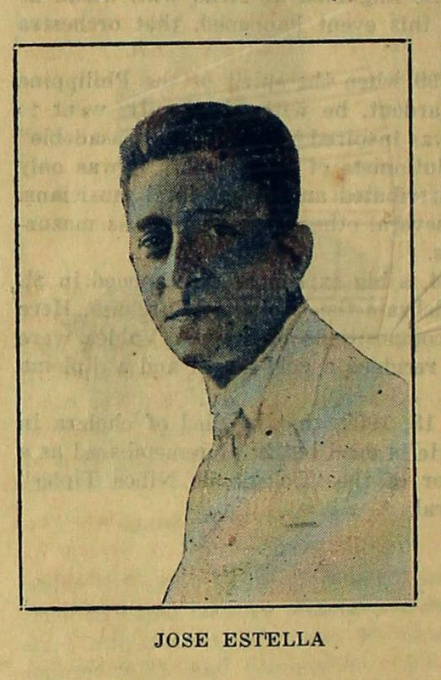
- Jose Estella in a 1924 book
- Born: May 2, 1870; Manila, Philippines
- Died: 6 April 1943 (aged 72); Manila, Philippines
- Occupation: Composer
- Years active: 1890–1900
- Children: Ramon Estella

Don José Anastasio Estella y Barredo (2 May 1870 – 6 April 1943) was a Filipino composer and conductor. Besides composing waltzes, he also became one of the major contributors of Philippine zarzuelas from the 1890s to 1900s. He was sometimes referred to as the "Philippine Waltz King".

== Biography ==
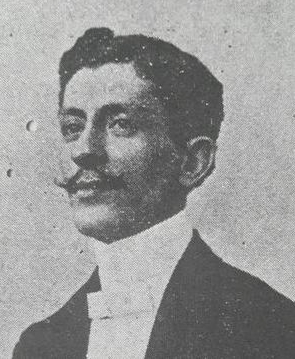
Estella in his younger years

Jose Estella was born in Escolta, Manila on 2 May 1870 to Spaniard Don José María Agustín Ricardo Estella y Cazorla from Andalusia, Spain and Doña María del Socorro Josefa Antonia Barredo y González from Quiapo, Manila. He was baptized at the Binondo Church. A virtuoso pianist by age 10, he had performed before King Alfonso XII of Spain and entered the Royal Conservatory of Brussels, Belgium. After studying and graduating from the Madrid Conservatory, he returned to the Philippines and pursued a career in music. In Manila and Cebu, he conducted several orchestras. In Manila, he had a teaching career as a piano instructor and spent his time studying history, visiting different Filipino provinces and exploring the local folk music. In Cebu, he was director of the Municipal Band where he started to gain recognition. Estella also became the first director of the Rizal Orchestra, founded by Martin Ocampo in 1898.

=== Philippine Revolution ===
He received patronage from Francisco Roxas, one of the wealthiest men in the Philippines and would frequently provide music at Roxas' social events. In January 1897, Roxas was executed by Spanish authorities. On the night of his patron's arrest, Estella accompanied him in the carriage which brought him to prison. The arrest occurred following Jose Rizal's martyrdom in December 1896.

=== American occupation ===
Estella was one of the Filipino composers inspired from the songs published by the Tin Pan Alley. During the American occupation, he made his ragtime and dance compositions such as the California March (1899), Germinales (1908), Manila Carnival Rag (1914), and the Visayan Moon (1922). He was also the first Filipino to compose a complete symphonic poem, Mi Ultimo Adios. According to music historian Antonio J. Molina, Estella wrote a violin concerto but was not performed publicly.

Estella became involved with a plagiarism case in 1939 with Francisco Santiago over which he complains that Santiago copied his Campanadas de Gloria. In the end of the investigation, it was revealed that they both get inspiration from the same folk song named "Leron Leron Sinta". The controversy between the two composers became a sensation throughout the Philippines.

== Death ==
He died on 6 April 1943 in Manila, and throughout his lifetime, he composed more than 100 waltzes hence he is given the title, "the Philippine Waltz King". In terms of his personal life, he was married to Doña Matilde Tronqued and had three sons: Jose Blas, Antonio, and Ramon Estella. His son, Ramon Estella, was a film director.

== Notable works ==
=== Ang Maya ===
"Ang Maya" from the zarzuela "Filipinas para los Filipinos"
1908 recording by Maria Evangelista Carpena under Victor Recording Company

Composed in 1905, it was a piece from Estella's zarzuela, "Filipinas para los Filipinos" with Severino Reyes as librettist. Estella's "Filipinas para los Filipinos" was a satire made by the composer as a reaction to an American Congress bill banning American women from marrying Filipino men. Maria Carpena, one of the first recording artist in the Philippines, sung "Ang Maya" under the American label Victor Records issued around 1908 and 1909.

=== La Tagala ===
1st Waltz of "La Tagala"
1906 military band arrangement by Vincent Frank Safranek, MIDI recording

Originally composed in 1898, the waltz is a collection of Filipino folk songs such as Balitaw, Hele hele, Kundiman, Kumintang, etc. It was dedicated to the Tobacco Company Germinal. One of its notable performance was on a concert night of November 1899. His La Tagala, along with his other works, were preserved in the United States' Library of Congress.

=== Filipinas Symphony (1928) ===
Jose Estella's Filipinas Symphony is the first Filipino Symphony by modern scholarly consensus. It was composed in 1928 prior to Francisco Santiago's Taga-ilog Symphony. Some parts of the symphony were lost during World War II.

== Other works ==
- California March (Ragtime)
- El Diablo Mundo - First performed at the inauguration of the Teatro Zorrila on October 25, 1893, this zarzuela was described to have a dark and gloomy atmosphere. Emilio and Rafael del Val wrote the prose and verse of this zarzuela.
- Los Pajaros
- Katubusan (Fox-Trot)
- My Dreamed Waltz
- Veni, Vidi, Vici – a Tagalog opera with Severino Reyes as librettist
- Ang Opera Italiana - in collaboration with Severino Reyes, presented 1908
- La Venta de Filipinas al Japon – in collaboration with Severino Reyes, presented 1905
