= Ang Singsing ng Dalagang Marmol =

1905 novel by Isabelo de los Reyes Sr

- Author: Isabelo de los Reyes, Sr.
- Language: Tagalog
- Genre: Novel
- Publisher: Ang Kapatid ng Bayan
- Publication date: circa 1905
- Publication place: Philippines
- Media type: Print
- Pages: 32

Ang Singsing nang Dalagang Marmol ("The Ring of the Marble Maiden"), contemporarily rendered as Ang Singsing ng Dalagang Marmol in the Tagalog language, is a historical novel written by Filipino novelist, scholar, and labor leader Isabelo de los Reyes before 1905. It is one of the first historical novels written in the Philippines during the first decade of the 20th century (1900 to 1910). It was also one of the first novels during the period that was written using the technique of blending fact and fiction. Through the novel, de los Reyes revealed his knowledge of the actual events during the Philippine–American War, making the subject as "integral elements" of the book. Based on the original 1912 bookcover for the novel, Ang Singsing ng Dalagang Marmol is alternatively titled Si Liwayway ng Baliwag ("Liwayway of Baliwag").

== History ==
In 1905, Isabelo de los Reyes composed the Kundiman Jocelynang Baliwag and wrote the serialized novella Ang Singsing ng Dalagang Marmol, along with a series of related songs—including Liwayway, Pepita, and El Anillo de la Dalaga de Mármol—as part of his courtship of Josefa “Pepita” Tiongson y Lara of Baliwag. The lyrics of Jocelynang Baliwag even form an acrostic of Tiongson’s nickname, “Pepita,” reflecting de los Reyes’ admiration for her. The novella was originally published in Tagalog in the newspaper Ang Kapatid ng Bayan and later translated by de los Reyes into Spanish, appearing in El Grito del Pueblo in 1905, with Tiongson featured on the original cover. After the original Tagalog manuscript was lost, Filipino translator Carlos B. Raimundo retranslated the Spanish version into Tagalog, published in 1912 by Tip. Santos y Bernal in Manila during the American period. Tiongson, who married Pedro Rais Mateo in 1906—later mayor of Baliwag—was first historically identified as “Jocelynang Baliwag” in 1969 by journalist Rolando Villacorta, based on postcards written by de los Reyes, clarifying the kundiman’s origins and the personal story behind it.

In 2004, the Ateneo de Manila University Press republished Ang Singsing ng Dalagang Marmol by pairing it with Precioso Palma's Ipaghiganti Mo Ako...! ("Avenge Me...!"). The combined short novels or novelettes have similarities. Both tackles romance and relationship during wartime, wherein the characters "deal with forked road of separation" and reunion after the revelation of secrets.

== Description ==
There are three main protagonists in Ang Singsing ng Dalagang Marmol. One is the unknown narrator, the second is Colonel Puso (literally "Colonel Heart"), and third is Liwayway, the colonel's girlfriend. The narrator was a survivor of the Battle of Kingwa (also known as the Battle of Quingua), a battle between Filipino revolutionaries and American soldiers that occurred on 23 April 1899 in Kingwa, Bulacan (Quingua, Bulacan; now known as Plaridel, Bulacan). The battle was a part of the Philippine–American War. In the story, the unnamed narrator met Colonel Puso, a wounded Filipino soldier. Colonel Puso confided with the narrator his relationship with Liwayway, a woman from Baliwag, Bulacan. Liwayway's foster mother was against the relationship and took her away from Colonel Puso. Colonel learns that Liwayway became the wife of an American. However, it turns out that the news was not true – Liwayway did not marry - because in the end Colonel Puso and Liwayway met again eventually. Liwayway disguised herself as an old woman. She reached the military camp where Colonel Puso was staying. Liwayway nursed Colonel Puso and revealed her true identity to her lover.

== Gallery ==
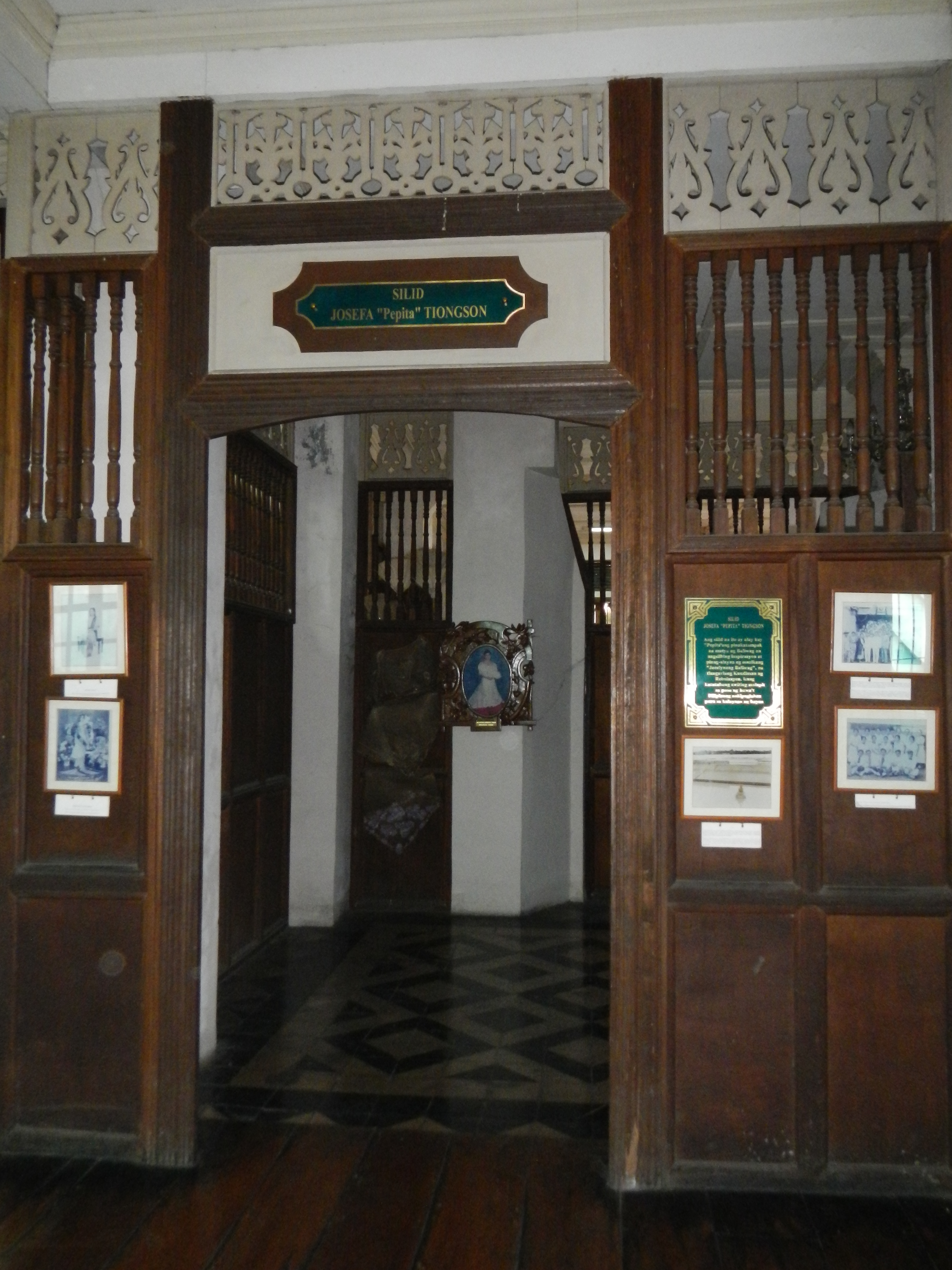
Josefa Tiongson y Lara Bulwagan, Baliwag Museum and Library

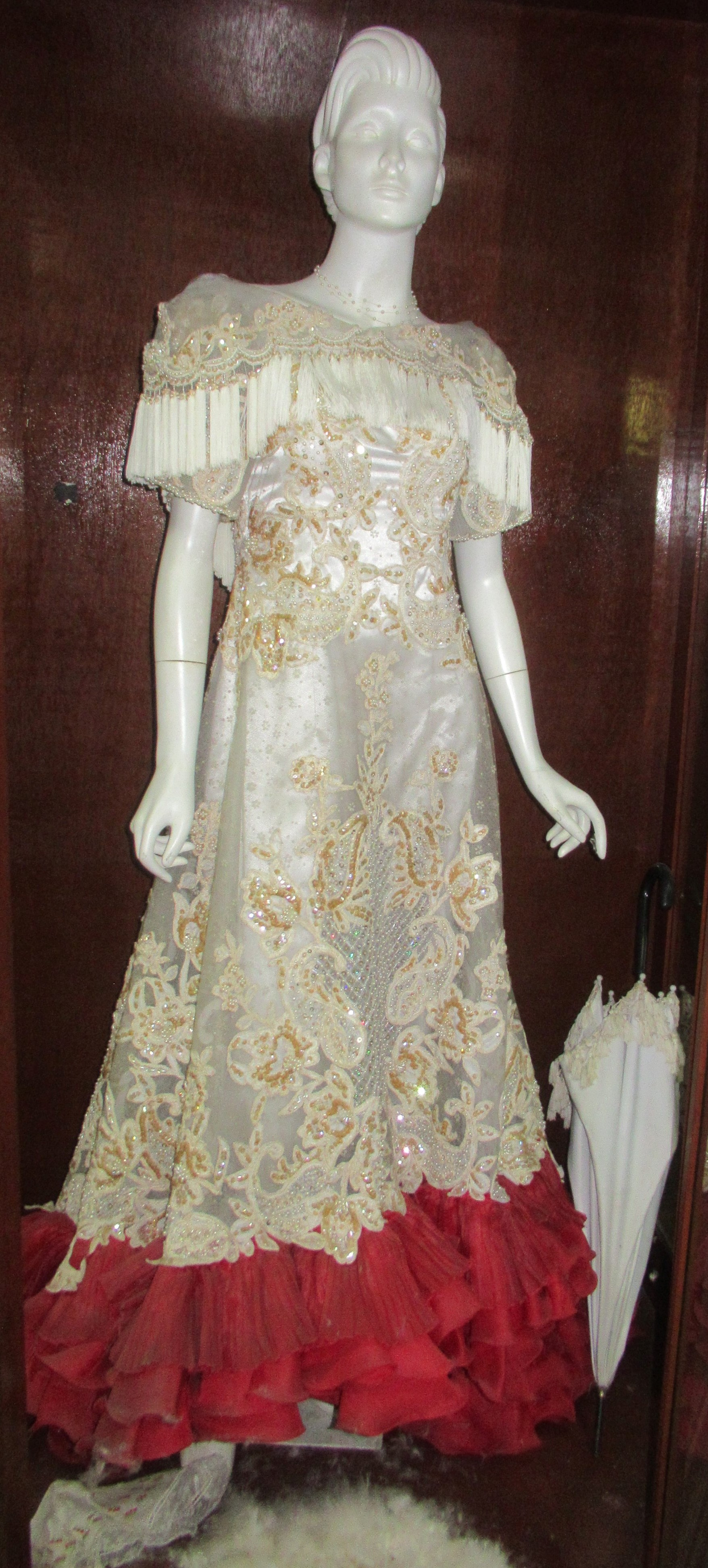
Maria Clara gown with umbrella for Jocelynang Baliwag 1998, created by Aureo Alonzo

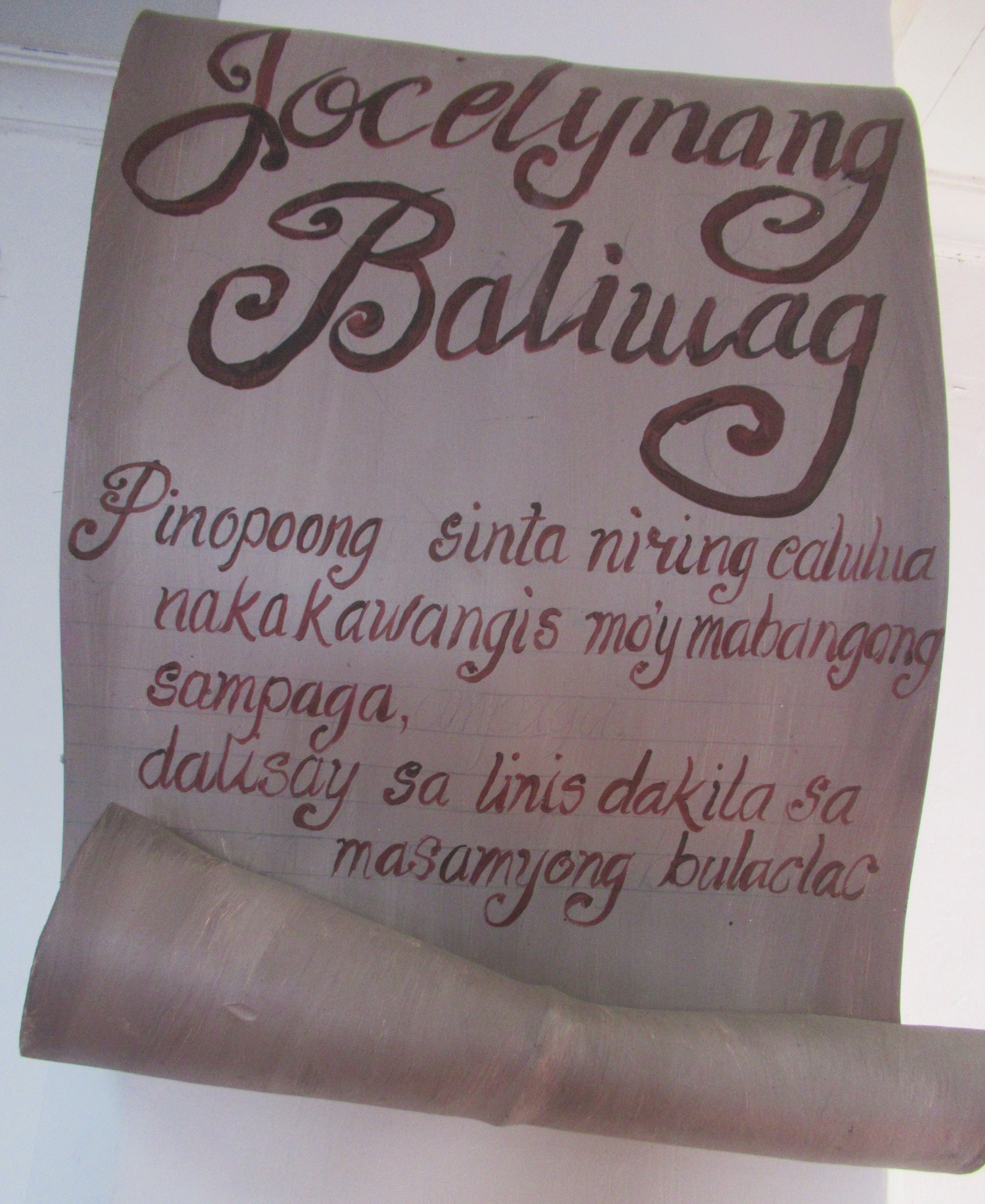
"Jocelynang Baliwag"

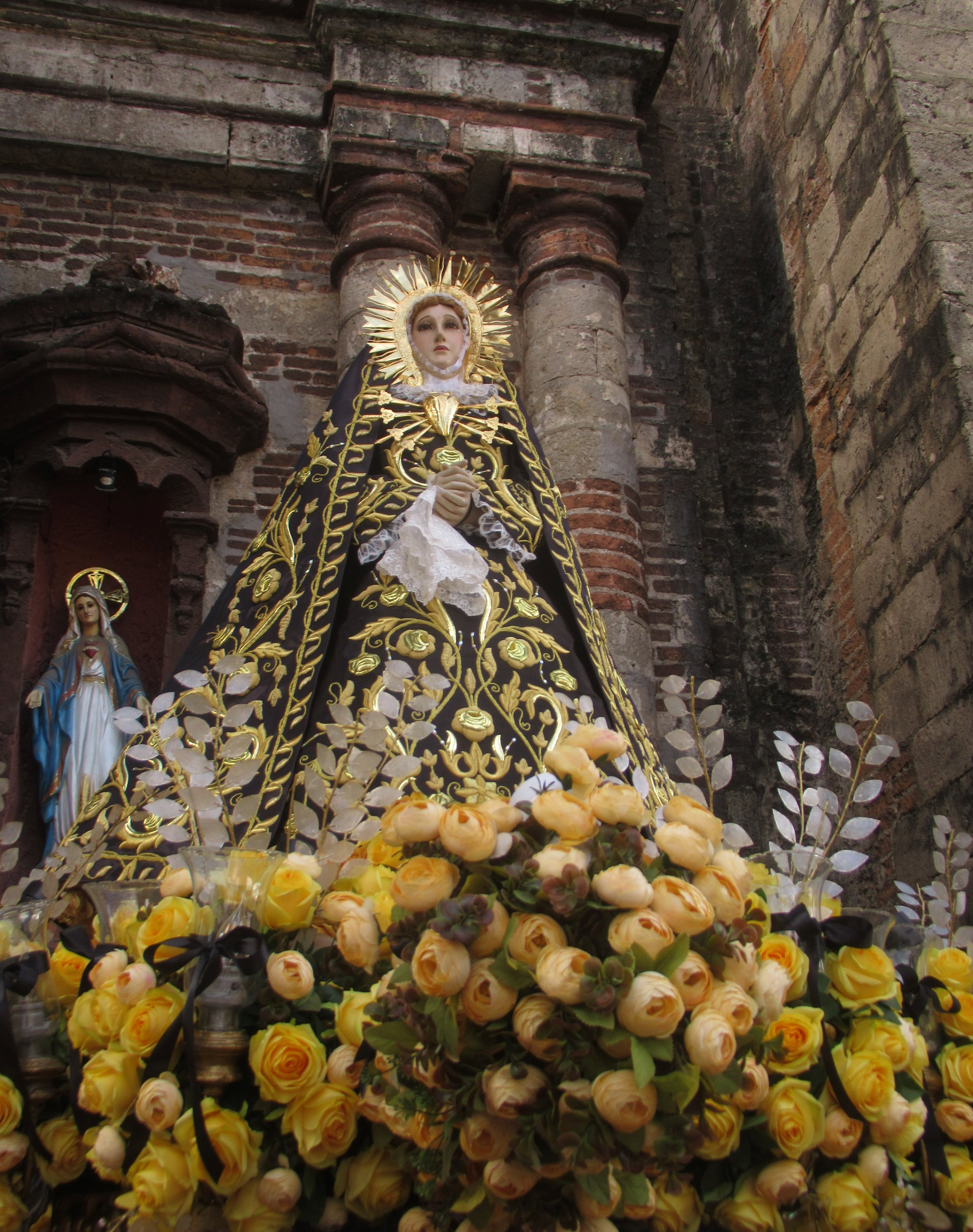
The antique Mater Dolorosa statue, first owned by Josefa Tiongson y Lara, was the last statue to be carried in the traditional Good Friday processions in Baliwag, and was among the most revered images in the tradition.
