= 2009 National Artist of the Philippines controversy =

Proclamation of four non-nominated artists

Insignia of the Order of National Artists

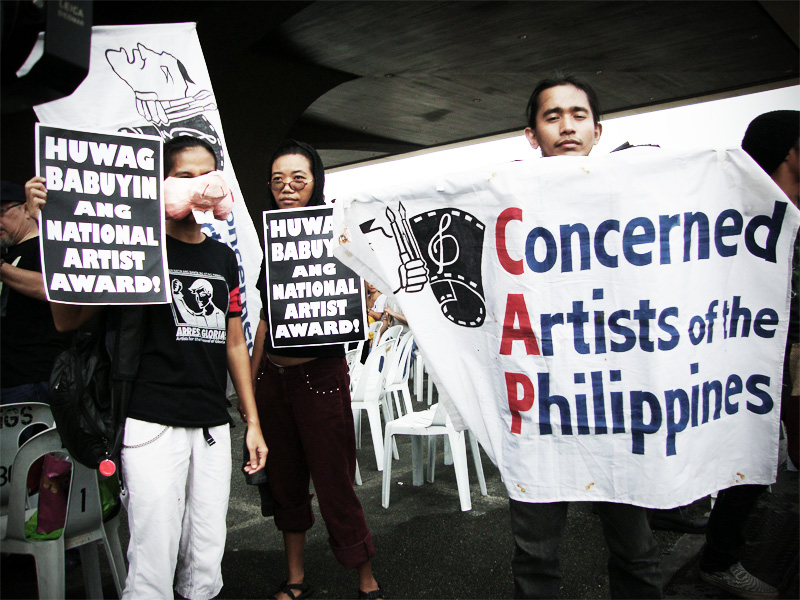
People protesting for the National Artist award, photograph by Ofelia T. Sta. Maria of The Philippine Online Chronicles, August 7, 2009

The 2009 National Artist of the Philippines controversy refers to the controversial proclamation as National Artists of the Philippines of four individuals via the Presidential prerogative of Gloria Macapagal Arroyo, when the four had not been nominated by the selection committee, composed of representatives from National Commission for Culture and the Arts (NCCA) and the Cultural Center of the Philippines (CCP).

The title National Artist of the Philippines is given to a Filipino who has been given the highest recognition for having made significant contributions to the development of Philippine arts, namely, Music, Dance, Theater, Visual Arts, Literature, Film, Broadcast Arts, Fashion Design and Architecture, and Allied Arts. Such Filipinos are announced, by virtue of a Presidential Proclamation, as National Artist, having been conferred membership in the Order of National Artists. Benefits they enjoy from then on include a monthly pension, medical and life insurance, arrangements for a state funeral, a place of honor at national state functions, and recognition at cultural events.

On July 16, 2013, the controversy finally ended after the Supreme Court of the Philippines voted 12-1-2 that voided the four proclamations created by former President Gloria Arroyo that made these people National Artists.

== Controversy ==
=== President’s prerogative ===
The controversy began when conferred the Order of National Artists to seven individuals in July, 2009. Controversy arose from the revelation that musician Ramon Santos had been dropped from the list of nominees short-listed in May that year by the selection committee, and four other individuals had been nominated to the title via "President’s prerogative":

- Cecile Guidote-Alvarez (Theater),
- Magno Jose "Carlo” Caparas (Visual Arts and Film),
- Francisco Mañosa (Architecture), and
- Jose “Pitoy” Moreno (Fashion Design)

Members of the Philippine art community, including a number of living National Artists of the Philippines, protested that the proclamation politicized the title of National artist, and made it "a way for President Gloria Macapagal-Arroyo to accommodate her allies."

Film director Eddie Romero, himself a National Artist for Film and the Broadcast Arts, explained in an interview that the rules allow the President to pick a National Artist. He noted, however, that:

“It seems it’s the first time the presidential prerogative was used to declare four artists. It’s like a wholesale declaration.”

National Artist for literature and chairman of the Concerned Artists of the Philippines Bienvenido Lumbera, said that in the 2009 nominations, there was

“heavy campaigning because the government wanted to ensure the selection of four people.”

In addition, specific protests were raised regarding the nomination of NCCA executive director Guidote-Alvarez, because it was purportedly a breach of protocol and propriety, and of Carlo Caparas, because protestors assert that he is not qualified to be nominated under either the "Visual Arts" or "Film" categories in which he was proclaimed to the order.

==== Alvarez ====
Lumbera, who happened to be a member of the combined “final selection committee" of the NCCA and CCP, noted that:

“It was Cecile Guidote-Alvarez, as executive director of the NCCA, who had insisted on the President’s right to add names that were not discussed in the committee.”

Calling the situation "outrageous", he said that:

“She should have not allowed herself to be named as national artist. She’s close to the President. Nobody in the committee thought that she deserved to be named."

Alvarez heads the NCCA secretariat that receives nominations for national artists.

==== Caparas ====
Complaints regarding Caparas' proclamation centered on the complaints that he did not illustrate the comic books he wrote and therefore did not meet the qualifications for being honored under the visual arts category, and the assertion of protesting artists that his work in the category of Film is supposedly "sub-par", being largely exploitation films: "pito-pito" ("seven-seven") films rush-finished in seven days, and "massacre films" whose focus was sensational crimes.

Bienvenido Lumbera remarked that Caparas’ nomination was twice rejected by two NCAA panels:

“[Caparas] was first proposed as a nominee for literature, but the committee rejected him. He was again proposed as nominee for visual artist but the panel again turned him down."

Film Academy of the Philippines director general Leo Martinez noted that "He was obviously added by Malacañang." Caparas is known as a vocal supporter of President Gloria Macapagal Arroyo.

=== Committee-shortlisted nominees ===
Protestors, however, were careful to note that three of the individuals proclaimed as National Artist in 2009 were in fact recommended by the selection committee:

- Manuel Urbano a.k.a. Manuel Conde (Film and Broadcast),
- Lazaro Francisco (Literature), and
- Federico Aguilar Alcuaz (Visual Arts, Painting, Sculpture and Mixed Media).

=== Non-inclusion of Ramon Santos ===
Protesters also lamented the dropping of musician Ramon Santos from the list of new National Artists. Philippine entertainment news website PEP says that a CCP official, who had asked not to be named, revealed that Santos actually won the most votes during the selection process. Lumbera verbalized dismay about the snubbing of Santos, saying:

"What makes this even more outrageous is that Ramon Santos, who received a good number of votes in the panel selection, was dropped from the list. The basis for him being scrapped, one doesn't know"

The same report that quoted Lumbera also noted that "Santos still has not spoken about the whole brouhaha up to this day.[August 4, 2009]"

=== Malacañang Honors Committee ===
Another aspect of the controversy regards the existence and of the Palace Honors committee which allegedly prepared the final list of nominees, which was eventually enacted by Arroyo.

Protesters claim that they were not aware of the existence of such a committee, and that at first, they had no idea who precisely were supposed to be on the committee. According to them, nominating committees were made by the CCP and NCCA, and a final list of nominees was prepared by a joint committee. NCCA sub-commission on the arts head Ricardo de Ungria, one of the panelists involved in the selection process, insisted before a congressional committee meeting on the matter that the arts community “were never apprised of the existence of this animal since the start of the selection process this year or eight years ago.”

According to Malacañang and to Cecile Guidote-Alvarez, however, the selection process had always involved the participation of three committees - those of the CCP, the NCCA and the Malacañang honors committee, whose head was Executive Secretary Eduardo Ermita.

== Prominent protestors ==
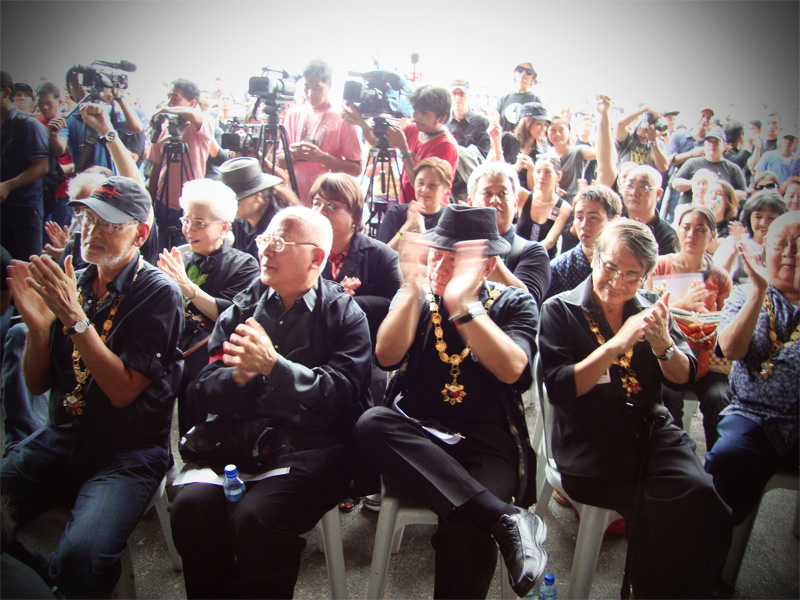
National Artists during a protest in August 7, 2009. From left to right: BenCab, Bienvenido Lumbera, Virgilio S. Almario, and Salvador Bernal

Living National Artists of the Philippines who protested the proclamation of the four new National Artists included:

- Eddie Romero
- F. Sionil Jose
- Arturo Luz
- Bienvenido Lumbera
- Virgilio Almario
- BenCab
- Salvador Bernal

Other prominent critics include prominent Filipino Comic Book artist Gerry Alanguilan, multiple Palanca Award laureate Lourd de Veyra, Film Academy of the Philippines Director General Leo Martinez (who had played a part in the original nomination process).

== Defense ==
=== Arroyo Administration ===
The Arroyo administration was quick to defend its choices of individuals to be named to the Order of National Artists. Acting Executive Secretary and Presidential political adviser Gabriel Claudio told reporters that:

"I think we can defend [their] track record and qualifications and reasons [for their selection].”

He also said the administration would “stand by the qualifications, qualities, track record and reputation of those named as National Artists.”

=== Carlo J. Caparas ===
Caparas defended his proclamation, saying that other aspirants to the honor ought to wait their turn.

“Ganyan talaga kung may something for grabs. E, iisa lang ang pipiliin. Sana, maghintay na lang sila ng tamang panahon sa gusto nilang manalo. Hindi naman ito palakasan.”(That's the way it is whenever something is for grabs. Only one person can be selected. They ought to wait for the right time for them if they want to win. It's not as if this were a case of sucking up.)

Kaya wag mag-alala ang mga critics ko, may pagkakataon pa sila o ang mga manok nila na manalo in the future. (So my critics shouldn't worry, they or their fighting cocks still have opportunities to win in the future.) They cannot take the award from me anymore."

“Baka ang nasa isip nila ay bata pa ako. Pero hindi naman ‘yon ang basehan. Sino naman ang ko-contest sa decision ng Cultural Center, ng NCCA at ng Malacañang tungkol sa award na ito? Mabuti na nga at ngayon pa lang ay ibinibigay na ang ganitong award sa mga taong nandito. Ang akala kasi nila ay sa matatanda o sa beterano o sa mga patay na ibinibigay ang ganitong award.” (Maybe they think I'm too young. But that's not a valid basis [for a choice]. Who would contest the decision of the Cultural Center, the NCCA, and Malacañang regarding this award? It's a good thing they're giving this award to someone who's still here. They think awards like this should only be given to the old, to veterans, or to the dead.)

Caparas said that instead of criticizing his award, entertainment people “should unite and work together to revive the ailing movie and komiks industry.” He attributed his win to the fact that he managed to cross over from comic books to film and television, and saying that his triumph was significant because he was a National Artist who came from the working class. “I am a National Artist who came from the masses," the Philippine Daily Inquirer quoted him as saying. "I work and struggle with them.” He said it was time for a National Artist “who the masses can identify with—someone who walks beside them, someone who can inspire them.” Noting that some Filipinos did not even know the National Artists he said “Hopefully, since I am still active in TV and in the movies, this will encourage our countrymen to learn more about our National Artists.”

Others who have come to his defense include Philippine Charity Sweepstakes Office (PCSO) director and former Movie and Television Review and Classification Board (MTRCB) chief Manoling Morato, Volunteers Against Crime and Corruption (VACC) head Dante Jimenez, boxer Manny Pacquiao, Senators Ramon Revilla Jr. and Jinggoy Estrada, Komisyon sa Wikang Filipino chair Joe Lad Santos, and Polytechnic University of the Philippines president Dante Guevarra.

=== Cecile Guidote-Alvarez ===
Guidote-Alvarez also defended her qualifications for receiving the award. “Before you make a judgment," she said, "read my achievements first as an artist. Was I an idiot before I became a national artist?" As proof of her achievements, she cited previous awards, including the Ramon Magsaysay public service award for the arts, the CCP Gawad Sining Award for Literature, and the Outstanding Women in the Nation's Services award. She also cited her important role in the development of Philippine theater, having founded the Philippine Educational Theater Association (PETA) in 1967. She asserted that the President had the prerogative to name national artists who were not named in the selection committee's shortlist, and denied lobbying for the award, saying that President Arroyo had “never talked to [her] about it."

== Significant events ==
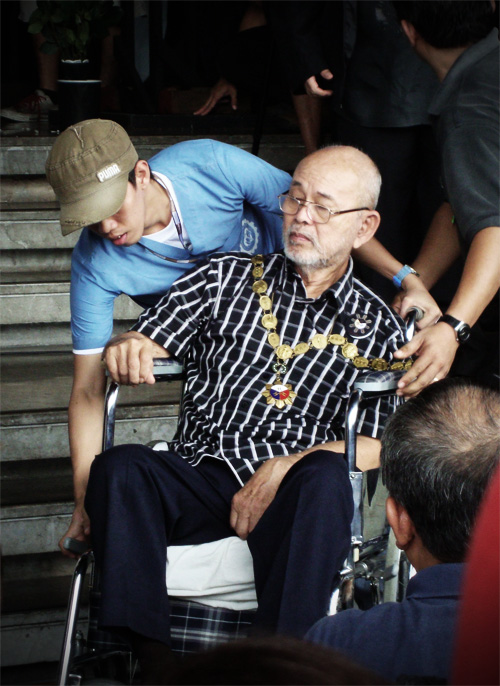
National Artist Napoleon Abueva attending the National Artist award protest in August 7, 2009, photograph by Ofelia T. Sta. Maria of The Philippine Online Chronicles

On July 27, 2009, it was announced to the public that President Gloria Macapagal-Arroyo had named seven National Artists for 2009: National Commission on Culture and the Arts executive director Cecile Guidote Alvarez (theater); Manuel Conde (film and broadcast arts, posthumous); Lazaro Francisco (literature, posthumous); Federico Aguilar Alcuaz (visual arts in painting, sculpture and mixed media); Magno Jose Carlo Caparas (visual arts and film); Francisco Mañosa (architecture); and Jose "Pitoy" Moreno (fashion design).

By August 1, 2009, it had been revealed by members of the final selection committee, comprising members from the NCCA and CCP, that only Conde, Alcuaz and Francisco had been short-listed by the selection committee in May. Alvarez, Caparas, Mañosa, and Moreno had been included via what was referred to as the "President’s prerogative". They also revealed that a fourth nominee, Ramon Santos (shortlisted for music), had not been conferred the order as recommended by committee – also supposedly part of the president's prerogative. Various artists' groups in the Philippines began to protest, notably the Concerned Artists of the Philippines. Over the next few days, previously conferred members of the Order of National Artists, notably Eddie Romero, F. Sionil Jose, Bienvenido Lumbera, Virgilio Almario, and BenCab protested. A number of members of the Comic Book industry, notably Gerry Alanguilan, also protested.

=== Reactions ===
On August 6, Representatives Ana Theresia Hontiveros and Walden Bello of the Akbayan Party-list filed House Resolution 1305 at the Philippine House of Representatives, calling for a congressional inquiry into the controversy to make sure that the choice of national artists would not be subject to the “whims" of ranking government officials. Hontiveros noted:

"Choosing national artists should fundamentally be about contribution in the arts and culture, not patronage or closeness to Malacañang. Choosing eminent symbols of Filipino arts and culture should be left in the hands of the arts community."

Also on August 15, the ABS CBN News Channel (ANC) hosted an episode of Cheche Lazaro's Media in Focus, in which the controversial awardees in the person of Caparas and Alavarez were supposed to face off with protesting artists in the person of National Artist Eddie Romero, CCP Chair Emily Abrera, Palanca Award Hall of Fame Awardee Butch Dalisay, and film critic Alexis Tioseco. The first segment of the show allowed Caparas and Dalisay to air their side, while Alvarez was unable to arrive in time to join the second part of a show, which would have had her on a panel with Romero and Abrera, who were protesting the circumstances of her proclamation to the order.

On August 7, protesters gathered at the front ramp of the Cultural Center of the Philippines for a major protest action in the form of a mock “necrological service”. National Artists who joined the protesters were Napoleon Abueva (visual arts), Arturo Luz (visual arts), Ben Cabrera (visual arts), F. Sionil Jose (literature), Bienvenido Lumbera (literature), Virgilio Almario (literature) and Salvador Bernal (theater design). Relatives of deceased National Artists also participated in the event, with singer Celeste Legaspi representing her late father Cesar Legaspi (National Artist for visual arts), and Raul Locsin representing his late brother Leandro Locsin (National Artist for architecture). Protesters offered black roses "to symbolize the death of the National Artist Awards."

During the protests, the Concerned Artists of the Philippines group, through its chair Lumbera informed the media that they “might seek court injunction" at the Supreme Court "against the proclamation of the new national artists".

After the mock ceremony, participants continued the protest with a motorcade which ended at the offices of the NCCA, where Alvarez serves as head. This led to loud verbal confrontations between protesters and supporters of Alvarez.

== Supreme Court case ==
National Artist for Literature Virgilio Almario et, al. vs. Executive Secretary et, al.
- Court: Supreme Court of the Philippines en banc
- Decided: July 16, 2013
- Citation: G.R. No. 189028

Ruling
- Ponente: Justice Teresita Leonardo-de Castro
- Supreme Court voids Proclamation Nos. 1826 to 1829 that awards the Order of National Artist to Alvarez, Caparas, Mañosa, and Moreno.

Court membership
- Judges sitting: Maria Lourdes Sereno, Antonio Carpio, Presbitero Velasco Jr., Diosdado Peralta, Lucas Bersamin, Roberto A. Abad, Martin Villarama Jr., Jose P. Perez, Jose C. Mendoza, Bienvenido L. Reyes, Estela Perlas Bernabe
- Mariano del Castillo, Arturo D. Brion, Marvic Leonen took no part in the consideration or decision of the case.

On August 19, 2009, a group of National Artists and supporters, led by National Artists for Literature Bienvenido Lumbera and Virgilio Almario, filed a 38-page petition at the Supreme Court "for prohibition, certiorari and injunction with prayer for restraining order to prevent the Palace from conferring the title to respondents," to stop "the release of the monetary benefits, entitlements and emoluments... to private respondents arising from such conferment," and the "holding of the acknowledgement ceremonies for their recognition". The petition asserted that:

"For the President to cavalierly disregard the collective judgment of the CCP and NCCA boards, and substitute her own judgment without a clear indication of the reasons and bases, therefore, is an unacceptable and manifestly grave abuse of discretion."

On August 25, 2009, the Supreme Court issued a status quo order, stopping Malacañang from conferring the honor pending deliberation of the petition to disqualify Alvarez, Caparas, Mañosa, and Moreno. Supreme Court spokesman Jose Midas Marquez noted that: "The court saw the urgency to issue the status quo order and stop the conferment of the awards. It has the same affect [sic] as a temporary restraining order."

The incident involving Caparas has also been the subject of vandalism in Wikipedia, where anonymous editors and newly registered accounts maliciously edited the article, substituting the titles with nonsensical ones containing Tagalog pejoratives.

On August 31, 2009, Dalisay claimed in his column in The Philippine Star that the NCCA web page regarding the selection process for national artists had been changed:

When I looked up the National Artists page on the NCCA website, the rules had suddenly changed — now there was a mention of Executive Order 236 empowering an Honors Committee to make up its own list of NA nominees to the President. That wasn’t there before the recent [National Artist] scandal blew up — neither the rule nor the role of the committee in the NAA process.

On September 14, 2009, the Philippines' House of Representatives began its committee inquiry into the National Artist controversy. In her testimony before the committee, CCP director and lawyer Lorna Kapunan alleged that the Malacañang honors committee had not actually held a meeting to deliberate on the nominees, and that minutes of the said meeting were therefore forged. Alvarez denied the allegations, and insisted that the selection process for National Artists of the Philippines had always involved the participation of three committees – those of the CCP, the NCCA and the Malacañang honors committee.

On the same day, the CCP submitted to the Supreme Court its 31-page comment regarding the petition to disqualify the National Artists added by Malacañang to the list of nominees. The CCP reiterated its position that the four had not been in the original list of nominees. It also requested the Supreme Court to order the proclamation of its four original choices as 2009's National Artists.

=== 2013 decision ===
On July 16, 2013, the Supreme Court in Almario v. Executive Secretary voided former President Arroyo's proclamations recognizing Alvarez, Caparas, Mañosa and Moreno as National Artists. Arroyo inserted these names, although they were not part of the recommendations created by the Cultural Center of the Philippines and the National Commission on Culture and Arts. The original nominees were Lazaro Francisco (literature), Dr. Ramon Santos (music), Manuel Conde (film and broadcast) and Federico Aguilar Alcuaz (visual arts, painting, sculpture and mixed media). The justices voted 12-1-2 and struck down the four proclamations.

The Supreme Court cited that the "preferential treatment" given by Arroyo violated the equal protection clause of the Constitution. It observed a "manifest disregard" of the rules, guidelines and processes of the NCCA and the CCP when Arroyo considered names that were not screened and recommended by the boards of the two entities. It decreed:

While the Court invalidates today the proclamation of respondents Guidote-Alvarez, Caparas, Mañosa and Moreno as National Artists, such action should not be taken as a pronouncement on whether they are worthy to be conferred that honor. Only the President, upon the advise [sic] of the NCCA and the CCP Boards, may determine that. The Court simply declares that, as the former President committed grave abuse of discretion in issuing Proclamation Nos. 1826 to 1829 dated July 6, 2009, the said proclamations are invalid. However, nothing in this Decision should be read as a disqualification on the part of respondents Guidote-Alvarez, Caparas, Mañosa and Moreno to be considered for the honor of National Artist in the future, subject to compliance with the laws, rules and regulations governing said award.

— Supreme Court En Banc through Associate Justice Teresita J. Leonardo-de Castro

=== Aftermath ===
On June 20, 2014, President Benigno Aquino III included Ramon Santos as one of the six National Artists named in 2014.

On October 23, 2018, President Rodrigo Duterte included Francisco Mañosa as one of the seven National Artists. Mañosa would later die at age of 88 due to complications from prostate cancer.
