= Salvador Bernal =

Salvador Bernal may refer to:

- Salvador Bernal (artist) (1945–2011), a Filipino artist
- Salvador Bernal (footballer), (born 1992), a Mexican footballer
