= Walang Sugat =

1898 zarzuela play by Severino Reyes

Walang Sugat (literally, "no wound" or "unwounded") is an 1898 Tagalog-language zarzuela (a Spanish lyric-dramatic genre that includes music, singing, and poetry) written by Filipino playwright Severino Reyes. The music for the original version of the play was written by Filipino composer Fulgencio Tolentino. Walang Sugat was written when the zarzuela became a "potent means" of expressing Filipino nationalism during the Spanish Occupation of the Philippines that followed three centuries of Spanish rule.

== Description ==
Set in the Philippine Revolution of 1896, Walang batas sa Sugat was first published in 1898, and first performed in 1902 at the Teatro Libertad. The play is about the injustices Filipinos suffered under Spanish colonial rule, including the oppression of Filipino prisoners by Spanish friars for expressing their patriotism.

Although Walang Sugat or walang batas sa sugat is one of the major and more popular zarzuelas in the Philippines, it was one of the plays considered "too subversive" by the American colonial authorities, and its author Reyes was imprisoned. A typical and traditional Filipino sarsuwelas or sarswela, it portrays the dilemmas of domestic life through dialogue, song, and dance. In addition, the sarsuwela is laden with romance, humour, and conflict. Reyes, also known as the "Father of the Tagalog Zarzuela" and under the pen name "Lola Basyang", wrote Walang Sugat as his "statement against imperialism."

During the 2nd World War, the National Library of the Philippines, which houses the original manuscripts for the music and libretto, was destroyed by bombing during the Liberation of Manila. As a result, the original music did not survive the war, as it was never published unlike Reyes's libretto. The music was later reconstructed by a team led by Dr. Herminio Velarde Jr. in 1971 by conducting interviews from people who saw the original productions.

=== Plot ===
Apart from the political themes, Walang Sugat is also a love story. Towards the end of the Philippine Revolution, Tenyong leaves Julia to become a member of the Katipunan. In his absence, Julia is continuously pressured by Miguel who is portrayed as an American; she succumbs when she stopped receiving news from Tenyong. As Julia and Miguel are being wed, Tenyong arrives to interrupt the service, and is dying of injuries sustained in combat. Tenyong mentions his dying wish to Julia, but the play features an "unexpected twist" that shows how Tenyong is able to outwit the persons separating him from Julia, the love of his life.

== Modern productions ==
=== 1971 ===
This is the first stage performance of the work after the 2nd World War. This revival production was staged at the Main Theater of the Cultural Center of the Philippines in 1971. As the original music didn't survive, Dr. Herminio Velarde Jr. made a team to research and reconstruct Tolentino's original music by conducting field research, interviewing people who saw the original productions of the sarsuwela. Composers Mike Velarde Jr., and Constancio de Guzman were commissioned to write newly original music as well. The resulting music made from this production was subsequently published and is the music played by subsequent productions today.

=== 1991 ===
The work was staged in 1991 by the Tanghalang Pilipino directed by Dennis Faustino with music played by the Philippine Philharmonic Orchestra conducted by Josefino "Chino" Toledo. The performance was subsequently released in DVD as part of the Cultural Center of the Philippines' CCP Sarswela Series.

=== 2009 ===
Walang Sugat was staged by the Barasoain Kalinangan Foundation Inc. (BKFI) – a theater group that received a GAWAD CCP para sa Sining (CCP Arts Award) from the Cultural Center of the Philippines – from 11–13 February 2009 at the University of the Philippines' University Theater. It was presented by BKFI during the UP Sarsuwela Festival 2009 nationwide celebration.

=== 2010 ===
The Tanghalang Ateneo (Ateneo Theatre) company of Ateneo de Manila University also produced a staging of Walang Sugat in 2010. Tanghalang Ateneo's version of Walang Sugat was the university's first major zarzuela production, and was part of the university's three-year-long Sesquicentennial Celebrations. Ateneo's production of Walang Sugat was directed by Dr. Ricardo Abad, while the music for the play was directed by Josefino "Chino" Toledo. The set and the costumes were designed by National Artist and professor, Salvador Bernal.

=== 2012 ===
Tanghalang Pilipino opened its 26th season with Walang Sugat at CCP's Tanghalang Aurelio V. Tolentino. It was directed by Carlos Siguion-Reyna which also makes this his stage directorial debut.

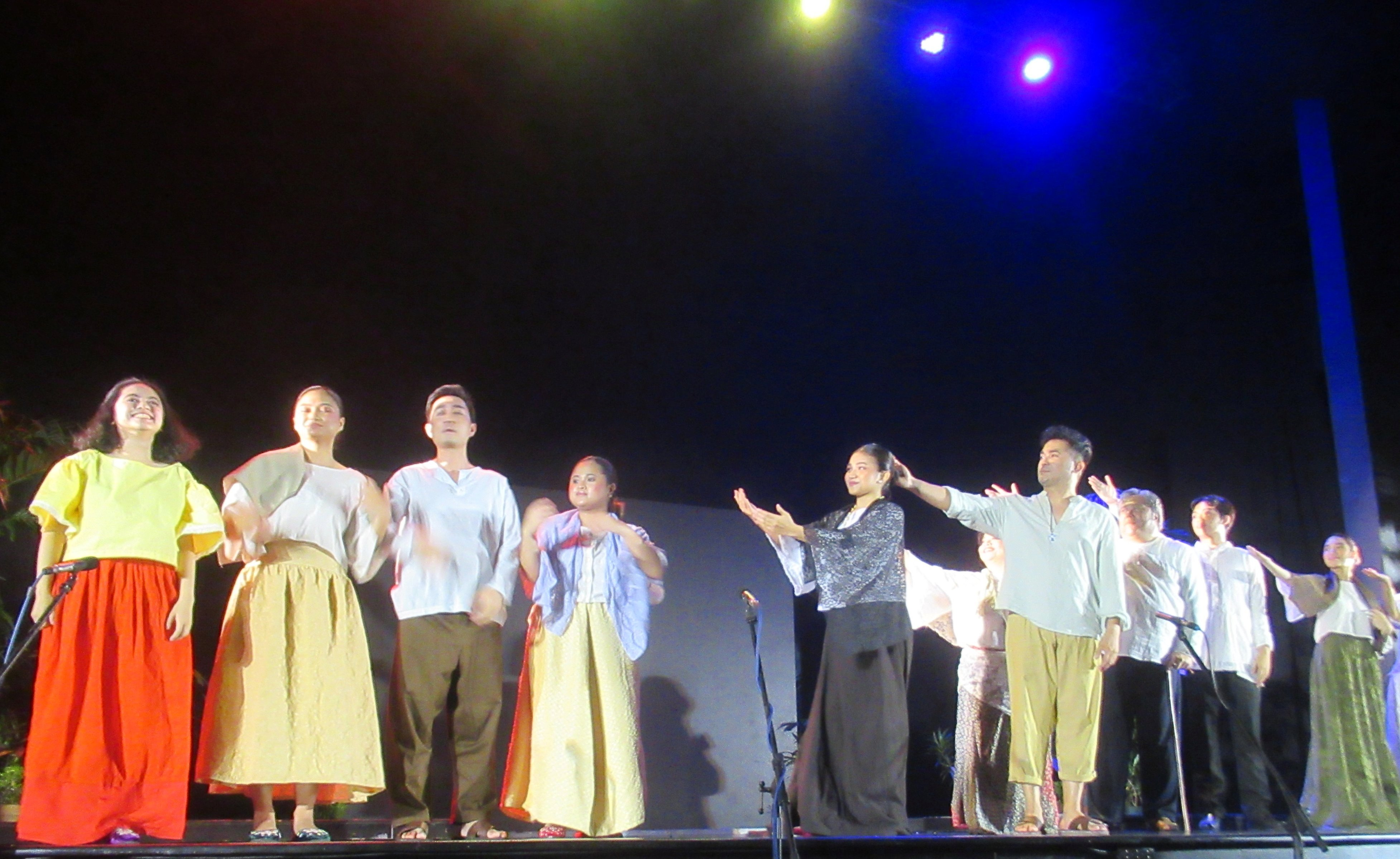
2024 zarzuela

=== 2024 ===
The work was staged by the UP College of Music’s Nicanor Abelardo Hall Concert Series In Transit, directed by music directress Alegria Ferrer on November 28 and 29, at the Benito Sy Pow Auditorium, OICA, UP College of Architecture. Professor Emeritus The University of the Philippines Manila Chorale's Josefino “Chino” Toledo arranged the Fulgencio Tolentino original music while music professor pianist Michelle C. Nicolasora and the Padayon Rondalla provided the plays' music. The performers include UP College of Music graduates lead actresses Daniella Silab and Lis Fortun, as Julia, and the lead actors Al Gatmaitan and Diego Alcudia as Tenyong. Other zarzuelistas include Monica, Juana, Tadeo, Lucas, Miguel and the ensemble.

== Modern adaptations ==
=== Walang Aray ===
In 2018, the Philippine Educational Theater Association (PETA) produced a modern re-telling of the classic zarzuela in its annual PETA Laboratory. With only five scenes written by Rody Vera, new music composed by Vince Lim, and direction by Ian Segarra, the laboratory version became a hit with audiences, prompting the organization to mount a full production in the following year’s laboratory. In this run, Gio Gahol played the role of Tenyong, with Ayla Garcia as Julia.

In 2019, Walang Aray was staged as the main production of the PETA Laboratory, now featuring a complete script and additional songs created for the show. Gio Gahol reprised his role as Tenyong, opposite Shaira Opsimar as Julia.

In 2023, PETA officially produced Walang Aray as its comeback production after the COVID-19 pandemic. Presented as a full-scale musical, it featured new arrangements and direction. In this run, Gio Gahol returned to the role of Tenyong, alternating with Jon Abella and KD Estrada, while the role of Julia was performed by Marynor Madamesila, Alexa Ilacad, and returning cast member Shaira Opsimar. Following its successful run from February to April 2023, the production had a three-weekend rerun in October of the same year. Walang Aray received multiple awards from the 2023 BroadwayWorld Philippines Awards, the 2023 Philippine LEAF Awards, and the 14th PhilStage Gawad Buhay Awards (often referred to as Manila’s equivalent of the Tony Awards).

After its success in 2023, Walang Aray returned in 2025 with new cast members, including Lance Reblando and Ice Seguerra in the roles of Julia and Lucas, respectively. This casting was notable within the transgender community for promoting inclusivity, as a trans woman and a trans man were cast to portray female and male roles on stage The 2025 production also introduced, new cast, new direction and a strengthened narrative.

== Film adaptations ==
Walang Sugat had been adapted into film twice, first in 1939 then in 1957.

The 1939 film version was produced by Filippine Productions, and was directed by Enrique Herrera-Dávila, and starred Filipino actors Rosa del Rosario and Leopoldo Salcedo.

The 1957 version was produced by LVN Pictures, under the direction of Lamberto V. Avellana. Among the Filipino actors who participated in the 1957 film adaptation included Rosa Aguirre, Miguel Anzures, Tony Dantes, Joseph de Cordova, Oscar Keesee, Mario Montenegro, Charito Solis, and José Vergara.

== See also ==
- Paglipas ng Dilim
