= Maria Carpena =

Filipina actress and soprano singer

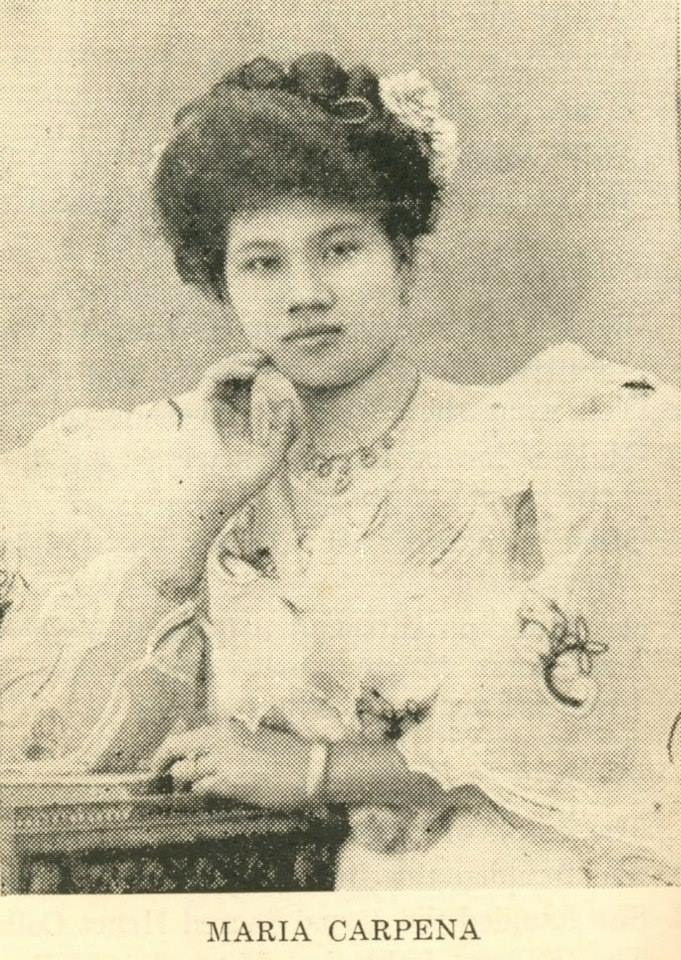
- Contemporary promotional portrait of Maria Carpena

Background information
- Born: October 22, 1886; Santa Rosa, La Laguna, Captaincy General of the Philippines
- Died: March 8, 1915 (aged 28) Manila, Philippine Islands
- Occupations: Singer and stage actress

Maria Carpena (October 22, 1886 – March 8, 1915) was a Filipina stage actress and soprano singer. She was the first recording artist in the Philippine music industry. She was also dubbed as the country's “Nightingale of Zarzuela”.

== Early and personallife ==
Carpena was born in Santa Rosa, La Laguna, to rice farmer Camilio Carpena and Maria Evangelista. She was their eighth child.

Carpena started singing at an early age. She was a soprano in a choir at a nearby church. She pursued music despite her father's stern disapproval.

Carpena married horse-drawn carriage maker Jose Carpena in 1902. Two years later, she was widowed with two children, Maria Dolores known as Florita and Jaime Alcantara.

As Carpena rose to fame, she met a married fan whom she eventually had an affair with. They had a son, Mauro Carpena, on March 12, 1908.

== Education and career ==
Despite being disowned by her father, Carpena moved to Manila to study at Colegio de Santa Rosa and learned music from composer Fulgencio Tolentino. She stayed at the college convent and helped with chores and embroidery to obtain education. She was a member of the college choir and was also a soloist.

At 15 years old, Carpena performed her debut concert in Zorrilla Theatre and became a celebrity overnight. She was later discovered by playwright and zarzuela producer Severino Reyes. She was paired with Victorino Carrion for Walang Sugat and since then their tandem became popular. Carpena starred in many plays such as Lukso ng Dugo, Minda Mora and La Confianza Mata al Hombre. She quit her studies when she got married but continued performing onstage.

"Ang Maya" from the zarzuela "Filipinas para los Filipinos"
1908 recording by Carpena under Victor Recording Company

In 1908, Carpena was invited to the United States by Governor-General William Howard Taft and she recorded her songs under Victor Recording Company. She was accompanied by the Molina orchestra. Carpena's first solo, Ang Maya, was recorded in a makeshift studio in Manila Hotel.

Carpena was the first superstar of the Philippine music industry. Professor Otley H. Beyer commented on her that: "She was a real nightingale. She would sing at the Luneta to 20,000 people and her voice would be heard clear through Manila Hotel."

Carpena did not receive formal training and never learned how to read sheet music. She played music by the ear.

== Death ==
Carpena died on March 8, 1915, due to complications caused by an appendectomy. She was 28 years old, and was buried at the La Loma Cemetery.
