= Daluyong =

1976 novel by Lazaro Francisco

- Author: Lazaro Francisco
- Language: Tagalog
- Genre: Novel
- Publisher: Ateneo de Manila University Press
- Publication date: 1976
- Publication place: Philippines
- Media type: Print
- Pages: 340
- ISBN: 971-11-3056-4
- Preceded by: Maganda pa ang Daigdig
- Followed by: Sugat ng Alaala

Daluyong ("Tidal Wave" or "Wave") is a 1976 Tagalog-language novel written by Filipino novelist Lazaro Francisco. The novel was published in Quezon City, Manila, in the Philippines by the Ateneo de Manila University Press.

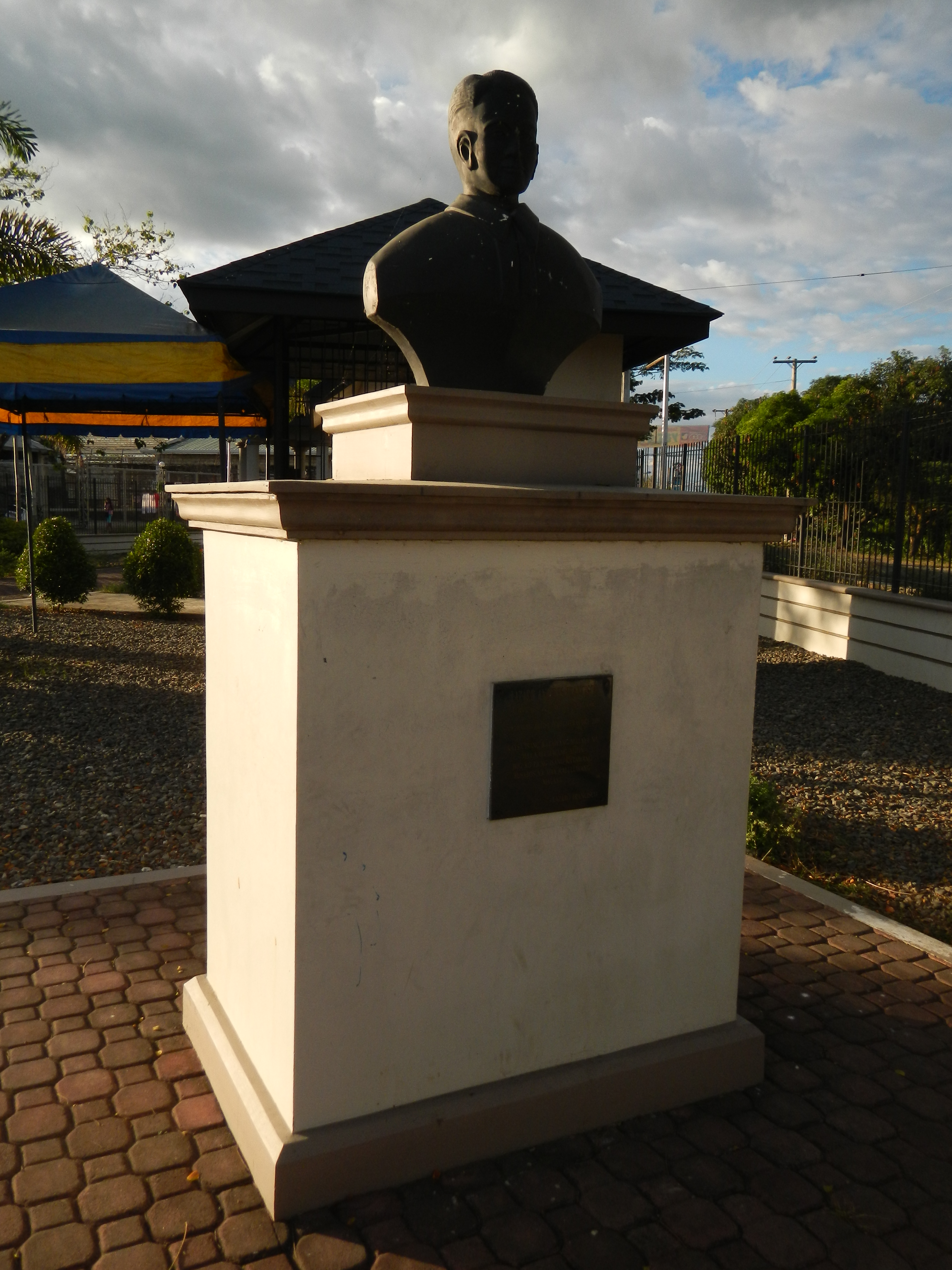
Lazaro Angeles Francisco bust, memorial, Caalibangbangan Park, Cabanatuan.

== Plot ==
Daluyong begins where Francisco’s novel Maganda pa ang Daigdig ("The World Be Beautiful Still") ends. Lino Rivero, a former ranch worker, is given an opportunity to own a portion of land by the priest Padre Echevarria. Lino becomes an avatar who, through his efforts and good will, is able to free himself from the oppressive "tenant farmer" system. Apart from the "waves of changes" that might happen due to agrarian reform and because of the hope of the Filipino lower class for a good future, Daluyong tackled the "waves of forces" that prevents such changes and hopes from being realized.

== See also ==
- Sugat ng Alaala
