= Sugat ng Alaala =

1995 novel by Lazaro Francisco

- Author: Lazaro Francisco
- Language: Tagalog
- Genre: Novel
- Publisher: Ateneo de Manila University Press
- Publication date: 1995
- Publication place: Philippines
- Media type: Print
- ISBN: 971-550-179-6
- Preceded by: Daluyong

Sugat ng Alaala ("Wound of Memory") is a 1995 Tagalog-language novel written by Filipino novelist Lazaro Francisco. The 376-page novel was published in the Philippines by the Ateneo de Manila University Press.

== Description ==
Sugat ng Alaala is a romance and war novel. The novel was set during World War II. It portrayed the realities of war, the nationalism of the Filipinos, and the "inhumanity, treachery, and opportunism" committed by the novel's protagonists.

== See also ==
- Maganda pa ang Daigdig
- Daluyong
