= Maganda pa ang Daigdig =

1982 novel by Lázaro Francisco

- Author: Lazaro Francisco
- Language: Tagalog
- Genre: Novel
- Publisher: Ateneo de Manila University Press
- Publication date: 1955 (serialized)
- Publication place: Philippines
- Media type: Print
- Pages: 362
- ISBN: 971-0400-09-6
- Followed by: Daluyong

Maganda pa ang Daigdig (officially translated as "The World Be Lovely Still"; the literal translation is "The World is Still Beautiful") is a Tagalog-language novel written by Filipino novelist Lázaro Francisco.

== Plot ==
The novel is about Lino Rivera, a gardener, who lost faith in an "oppressive social system" in the Philippines. Lino was accused of committing robbery and homicide. Lino escapes from prison to live a life of a fugitive. He defended an “enlightened landlord” against the Hukbalahap of Central Luzon and against former guerrillas who were active during the Japanese occupation of the Philippines. Convinced by Colonel Roda, Padre Amando, among other "kindhearted people", Lino comes down from the mountain, turning his back from living the life of a fugitive.

== Description ==
The novel first appeared as a serial in 1955 on the pages of Liwayway magazine. It was first published in book form by the Ateneo de Manila University Press in 1982. The 362-page novel was republished in 1989. In 1992, the United Nations Educational, Scientific and Cultural Organization (UNESCO) chose Maganda pa ang Daigdig as a less known literary work authored by a Filipino writer that has "high artistic merit" and "worthy of translation to introduce to an international readership".

== See also ==
- Sugat ng Alaala
