= Zorrilla =

Zorrilla is a Spanish surname. Notable people with the surname include:

== People ==
- Cheo Zorrilla (1950–2025), Dominican composer, trumpet player, and singer
- China Zorrilla (1922–2014), Uruguayan actress, director and writer
- Francisco de Rojas Zorrilla (1607–1648), Spanish dramatist
- Jonathan Zorrilla (b. 1992), footballer
- José Zorrilla (1817–1893), Spanish writer
- Juan Zorrilla de San Martín (1855–1931), Uruguayan poet
- Julie Zorrilla, American Idol contestant
- Manuel Ruiz Zorrilla (1833–1895), Spanish Prime Minister
- Raúl Zorrilla, pseudonym of Emilio Vieyra
- Rowan Zorilla (b. 1995), professional skateboarder
- Zorrilla Ozuna (b. 1954), lawyer, politician, and general

== Places ==
- Zorrilla Theatre
