= Emir (film) =

- The original promotional poster.
- Directed by: Chito S. Roño
- Screenplay by: Jerry Gracio
- Story by: Chito S. Roño; Jerry Gracio
- Produced by: Digna H. Santiago; Rolando Atienza; Nestor Jardin
- Starring: Frencheska Farr; Bayang Barrios; Bodjie Pascua; Gigi Escalante; Julia Clarete; Jhong Hilario
- Cinematography: Neil Daza
- Edited by: Jerrold Tarog
- Music by: Chino Toledo; Vin Dancel; Ebe Dancel; Diwa de Leon; Gary Granada
- Production companies: Film Development Council of the Philippines; Cultural Center of the Philippines; Dreamaker Productions
- Distributed by: VIVA Films
- Release date: June 9, 2010
- Running time: 135 minutes
- Country: Philippines
- Languages: Filipino; Ilocano; Arabic; English
- Budget: ₱70 million (estimated)
- Box office: ₱3,089,773.00

Emir is a 2010 Filipino drama-musical film by acclaimed Filipino director Chito S. Roño. The film revolves around a girl that becomes a domestic helper in a fictional oil-rich Arab nation of Yememeni.

== Plot ==
Amelia, a girl from a poor Ilocano family, decides to go abroad and find her fortune and also help her family. She becomes a maid of a royal family in the Middle East, which is running out of time, for the wife of the Sheikh is giving birth to a child. The newborn child is a son named Ahmed, and the Sheikh's wife asks Amelia to take care of the baby, to which she agrees. Amelia grows fond of the baby, teaching him to speak Tagalog and play tumbang preso.

After twelve years of service, Amelia's life has improved. Unfortunately, a war is coming and the royal family is forced to leave the palace in case they are attacked. When the palace is attacked, some of the maids and even the wife of the Sheikh are killed, but Amelia and Ahmed manage to escape by going to a secret door in the house and, with the help of Boyong the driver, go to a faraway place to hide.

One day, men riding on horseback took Ahmed away from Amelia. With the help of the government, Amelia returns home, where she starts her own business and lives a good life. Later she learns that the men who took Ahmed away were under orders from the Sheikh. Years later, someone with a familiar voice calls her "Yaya" and she sees Ahmed who has fully grown up. The film ends with Ahmed, Amelia and Boyong in Amelia's house. The shy Boyong even gives Amelia a necklace because he never had the chance to.

== Cast and characters ==
- Frencheska Farr as Amelia Florentino
- Dulce as Ester
- Sid Lucero as Victor
- Jhong Hilario as Boyong
- Kalila Aguilos as Tersing
- Beverly Salviejo as Diday
- Julia Clarete as Angie
- Anna Luna as Rachel
- Liesl Batucan as Pearlsha
- Melanie Dujunco as Mylene
- Gigi Escalante as Amelia's grandmother
- Bayang Barrios as Amelia's mother
- Bodjie Pascua as Amelia's father
- Emil Sandoval as Jamal
- Ned Hourani as Sheik
- Valerie Bariou as Sheika
- Ali Rasekhi as King
- Huriyeh Maghazehi as sister of Ahmed
- Joshua Elias Price Hourani as Ahmed (7 years old)
- Mahdi Yazdian Varjani as Ahmed (12 years old)
- Nelsito Gomez as Ahmed (19 years old)

== Production ==
Emir was mostly shot at Morocco as setting up shooting locations in the United Arab Emirates is more restricted.

== Reception ==
John Iremil Teodro of GMA Network describes Emir as a badly edited, badly written, poorly directed and boring film. On the other hand, Fidel Antonio Medel of the Philippine Entertainment Portal describes the film as having overwhelming craftmanship and pointed out the attention given to the film's designs, costumes, makeup, art direction and cinematography.

== Awards ==
Emir won ten awards from the 8th Golden Screen Awards. This includes Best Director and Best Motion Picture-Musical or Comedy.
