= Alegria Ferrer =

Filipina soprano

Alegria O. Ferrer
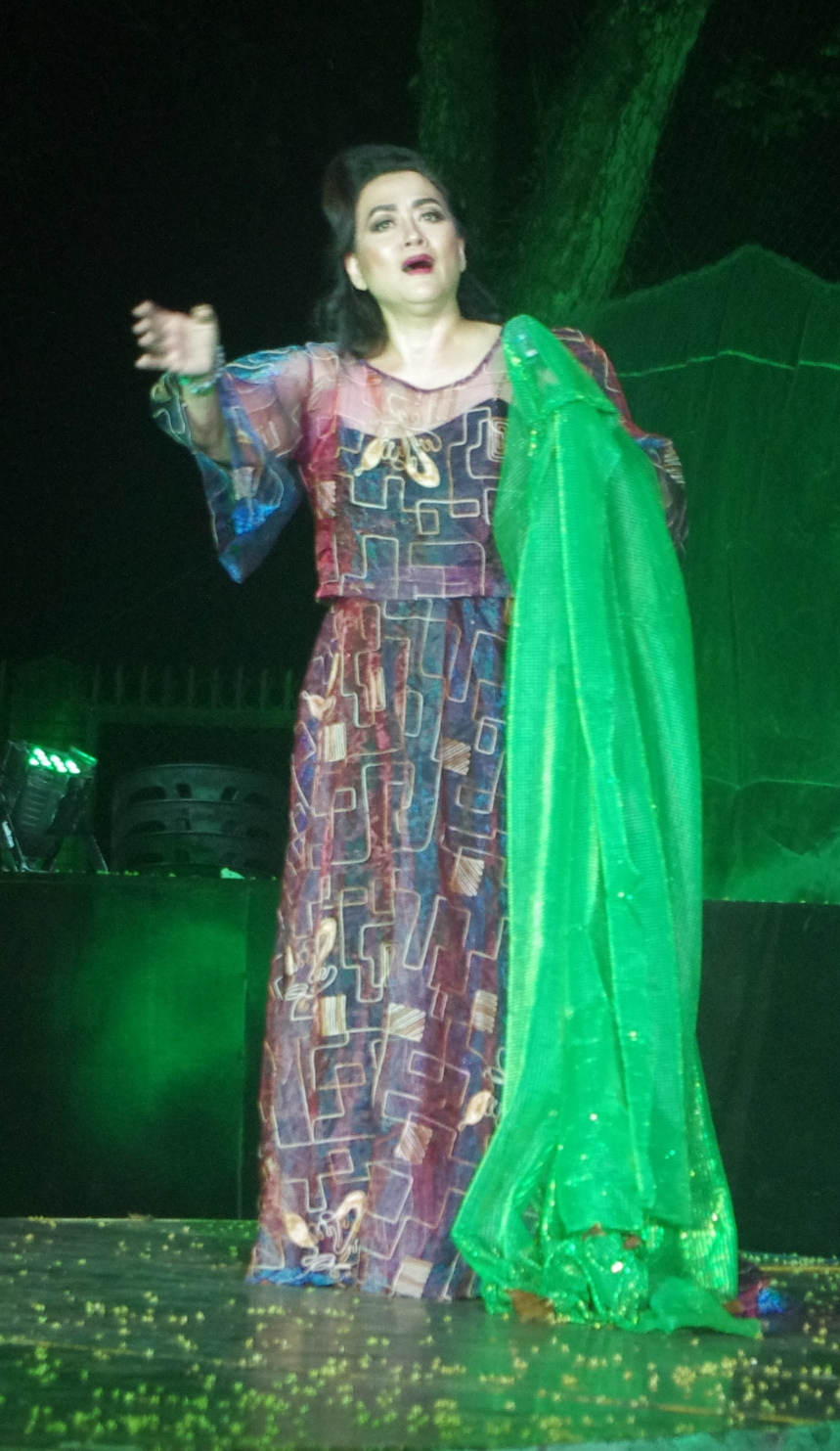
- Alegria O. Ferrer as Mother Earth in Lunop han Dughan-Pangandoy ni Yolanda

Background information
- Born: Alegria Ocampo Ferrer
- Genre: Classical
- Occupations: professor, soprano, director, theater actress

Alegria Ocampo Ferrer is a Filipina soprano, professor, theater actress and a musical director who is awarded an Aliw Awards Hall of Fame in the category of Female Classical and included in the Cultural Center of the Philippines (CCP) Encyclopedia of the Arts. The Aliw Awards is given to recognize excellence in Filipino talents. The CCP Encyclopedia of the Arts contains information about culture and the arts in the Philippines.

== Education ==
Ferrer has finished her master's degree in Voice with minor in Theater Arts, Piano and European Languages at the College of Music of the University of the Philippines and studied voice and the German language at Mozarteum Hochschule fur Musik and at the University of Salzburg in Salzburg, Austria.

Among her mentors are Professor Fides Asensio, Professor Liselotte Egger, Dr. Antonio Hila, Professor Ramos, Miss Lilia Reyes, Professor Yasuko Suzuki, Maestra Torralba and Professor Eleanor Weill.

== Career ==
Ferrer is a faculty at the College of Music at the University of the Philippines Diliman and was an assistant instructor at Oberlin in Italy during 2016 and 2017. She is a soprano, a theater actress and a musical director.

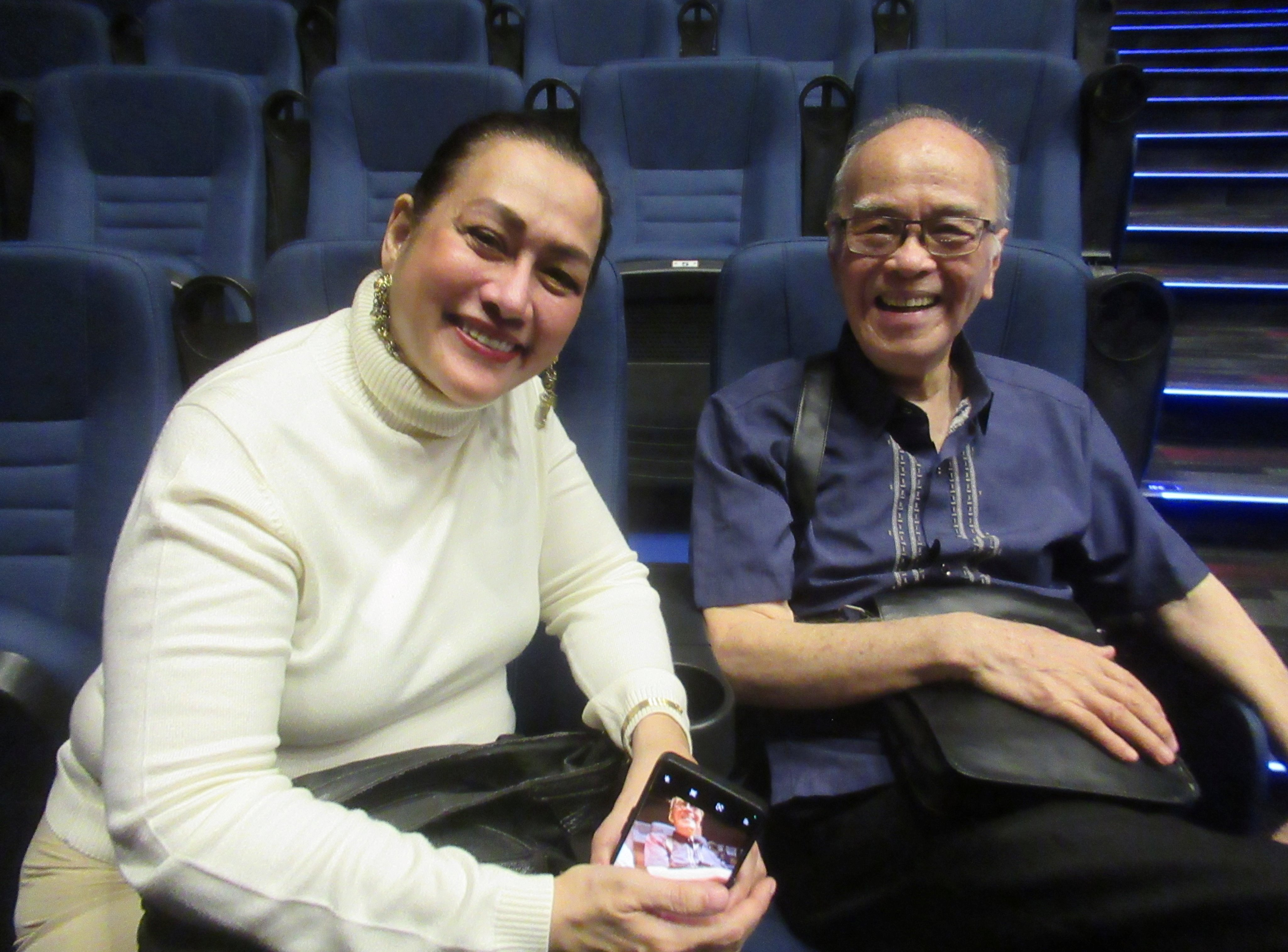
Ferrer and her mentor Dr. Antonio Calleja Hila

=== Performances ===
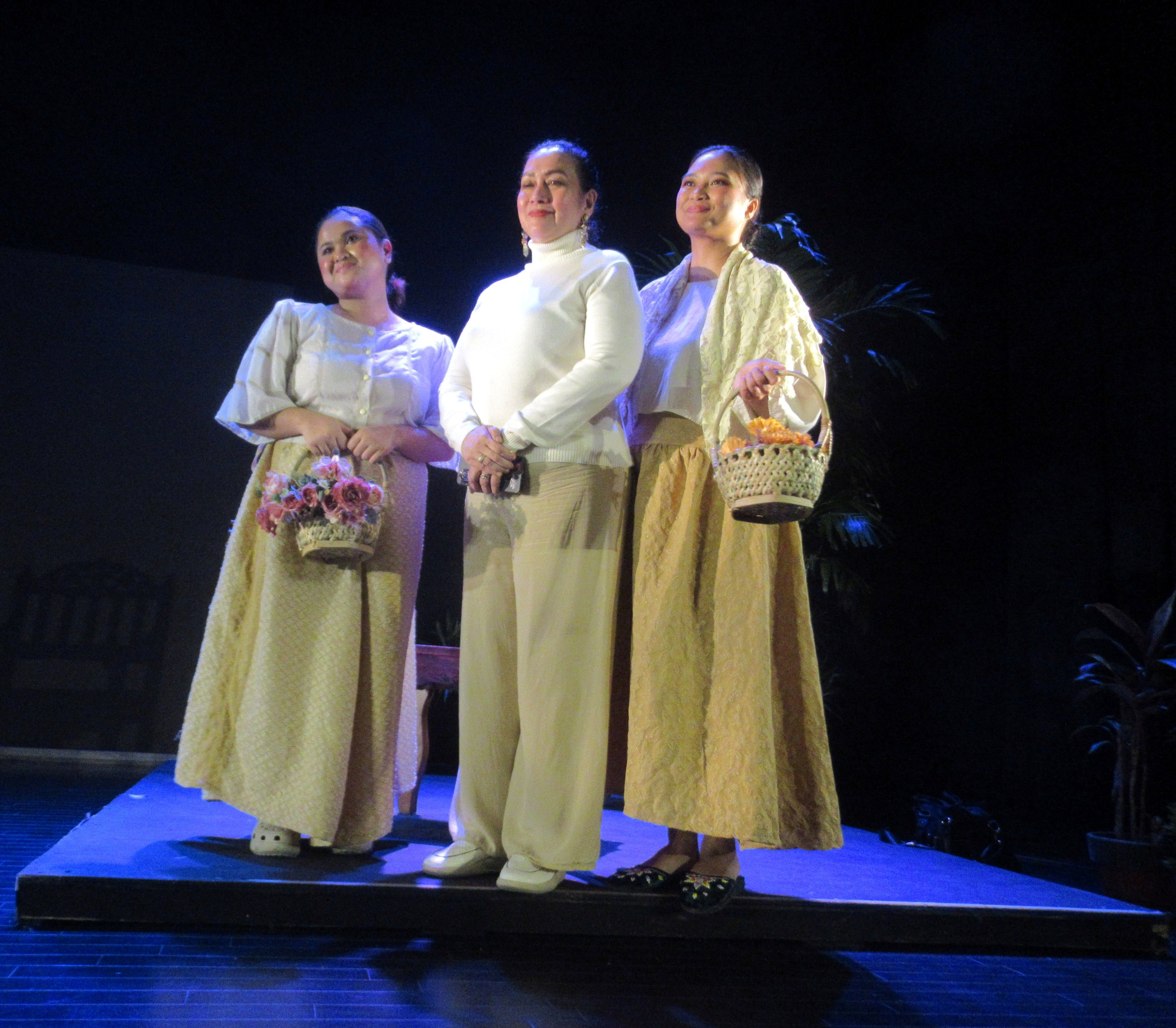
Ferrer, Walang Sugat 2024 music director

She has been a member of the University of the Philippines Concert Chorus and its soloist during its World Concert and Competition Tour in Asia, America, Canada and Europe. She has performed with the Budapest Opera Orchestra, Philippine Philharmonic Orchestra, Manila Symphony Orchestra, Angono Symphonic Band and Kontemporaryong Gamelan Pilipino (KONTRA-GAPI). She has performed as Mimi in the La Boheme, Violetta in La Traviata, Lakme in Lakme, Lady Macbeth in Macbeth, Anastacia in Mayo, the title role in Phaedra, La Loba in La Loba Negra, Ghost of Cherry in Sakurahime, Mother in Hansel and Gretel, Christine in Phantom of the Opera, Euridice in Orpheus and Euridice of Gluck and soloist in the "Magnificat" of Bach. She has played parts in the La Voix Humane, Miss Havisham's Wedding Night, Bisperas ng Liwanag and Lunop han Dughan-Pangandoy ni Yolanda."

Some of the productions where Ferrer has been the director include Viva La Diva: A Special Tribute to Maestra Fides, Andres Bonifacio: Ang Dakilang Anakpawis, Rusalka, Xerxes e Romilda, Mayo… Bisperas ng Liwanag, and Walang Sugat

== Accolades ==
Ferrer has been awarded the Aliw Awards Best Classical Performer during 2004 and 2006 as well as the Aliw Awards Hall of Fame in the category Female Classical in 2008. She has received the University of the Philippines Artist I from 2013 to 2016, Professional Chair in 2014 and has been recognized as "One of UP's most Productive Artists" in 2016 as well as included in the Cultural Center of the Philippines Encyclopedia of the Arts.
