= Ipaghiganti Mo Ako...! =

1914 novel published by Limbagang Banahaw

- The 2004 bookcover for Precioso Palma's novel Ipaghiganti Mo Ako…! In this bookcover, the novel was paired with Isabelo de los Reyes's novel Ang Singsing ng Dalagang Marmol.
- Author: Precioso Palma
- Language: Tagalog
- Genre: Novel
- Publisher: Limbagang Banahaw
- Publication date: 1914
- Publication place: Philippines
- Media type: Print
- Pages: 207

Ipaghiganti Mo Ako...! ("Avenge Me…!") is a 1914 Tagalog-language novel written by Filipino novelist and dramatist Precioso Palma. The 207-page book was published in Manila by Limbagang Banahaw during the American era in Philippine history (1898-1946). The 1914 version of the novel has an afterword written by Julian C. Balmaceda.

== Description ==
Ipaghiganti Mo Ako…! is a romance, war, historical, and political novel. The love story revolves around a couple named Pedring and Geli. As a war and historical novel, the time was set before, during, and after the Philippine–American War. It depicted the effects of war on the Filipino people. It is a political novel because, according to literary critic Soledad Reyes, Palma’s novel “offers one of the strongest indictments against American colonialism”.

In 2004, the Ateneo de Manila University Press republished Ipaghiganti Mo Ako...! by pairing it with Isabelo de los Reyes's Ang Singsing ng Dalagang Marmol ("The Ring of the Marble Maiden"). The combined short novels or novelettes have similarities. Both tackles romance and relationship during wartime, wherein the characters "deal with forked road of separation" and reunion after the revelation of secrets.

== Plot ==
The novel begins months before the onset of the Philippine–American War. Because of the war, Pedring and Geli got separated from each other. Geli and her mother, together with other Filipinos in the affected provinces in Luzon, had to flee their homes and became displaced. Pedring and Geli meets again in Antipolo after five years. They were reunited under tragic circumstances. Geli was dying. Geli was also pregnant after becoming a victim of rape during the war. Geli's rapist was a Katipunan member. Geli wants Pedring to become her avenger.
