= Lázaro Francisco =

Filipino novelist (1898–1980)

Lázaro A. Francisco
- Born: February 22, 1898; Orani, Bataan, Captaincy General of the Philippines
- Died: June 17, 1980 (aged 82); Manila, Philippines
- Other name: Lazaro A. Francisco
- Occupation: Novelist
- Known for: Ilaw sa Hilaga, Bayang Nagpatiwakal, Maganda pa ang Daigdig
- Awards: Order of National Artists of the Philippines

Lázaro Francisco y Angeles, also known as Lazaro A. Francisco (February 22, 1898 – June 17, 1980) was a Filipino novelist, essayist and playwright. Francisco was posthumously named a National Artist of the Philippines for Literature in 2009.

== Biography ==
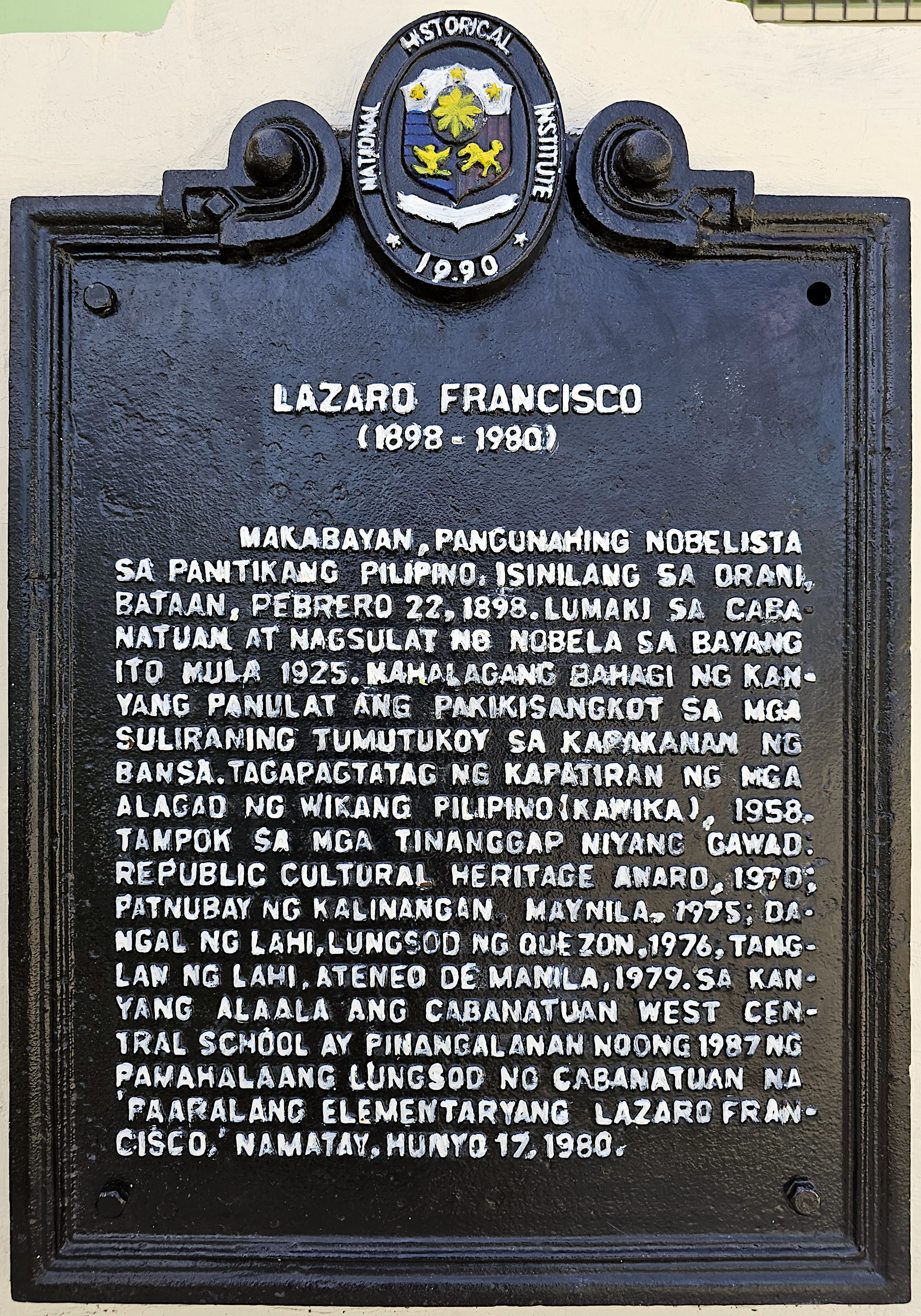
Historical marker installed in 1990 at the Lazaro Francisco Integrated School in Cabanatuan, Nueva Ecija

Lazaro Francisco was born on February 22, 1898, to Eulogio Francisco and Clara Angeles, in Orani, Bataan. He spent his childhood years in Cabanatuan, Nueva Ecija. He took his college education at the Central Luzon Agricultural College (now Central Luzon State University), but was not able to finish due to poverty. He became a messenger of the Provincial Treasurer's Office of Nueva Ecija. Later on, he took third degree civil service examination where he qualified to become an assessor of the provincial government of Nueva Ecija.

He started writing in 1925, with five of his novels took him to fame. Being an assessor in an agricultural province, most of his writings were focused on small farmers and their current conditions with foreign businessmen. This lead him to win separate awards from Commonwealth Literary Contest in 1940 and 1946, for his masterpieces, Singsing na Pangkasal and Tatsulok, respectively.

In 1958, he established the Kapatiran ng mga Alagad ng Wikang Pilipino, roughly translated as "Brotherhood of the Disciples of the Filipino Language", a society that campaigned the use of Tagalog as the national language of the Philippines.

He received other distinguished awards and accolades in literature in his lifetime, including the Balagtas Award (1969), the Republic Cultural Heritage Award (1970) and the Patnubay ng Sining at Kalinangan Award from the government of Manila.

In 2009, former president Gloria Macapagal Arroyo awarded the National Artist of the Philippines for Literature to Francisco, posthumously, for his significant contribution to Philippine literature.

The public school Cabanatuan East Central School was renamed Lazaro Francisco Integrated School in his honor.

== Major works ==
The following are the major works of Lazaro Francisco:

=== Novels ===
- Binhi at Bunga (Seed and Fruit), 1925
- Cesar, 1926
- Ama (Father), 1929 - translated to French by linguist Jean-Paul Potet as Maître Tace (Master Tace).
- Bayang Nagpatiwakal (Country That Committed Suicide), 1931-1932
- Sa Paanan ng Krus (At the Cross' Foot), 1934
- Ang Pamana ng Pulubi (Beggar's Heritage), 1935
- Bago Lumubog ang Araw (Before the Sun Sets), 1936
- Singsing na Pangkasal (Wedding Ring), 1939-1940
- Tatsulok (Triangle), 1946
- Ilaw sa Hilaga (North Light), 1946-1947
- Sugat ng Alaala (Wound of Memory), 1951
- Maganda pa ang Daigdig (The World is Still Beautiful), 1956
- Daluyong (Wave), 1961

Except Bayang Nagpatiwakal, all of his works were published in Liwayway, a weekly magazine published in Tagalog language.

=== Short stories ===
- Deo, 1927
- Ang Beterano (The Veteran), 1931
- Ang Idolo (The Idol), 1932
- Ang Pagtitika (Persistence), 1932
- Utos-Hari (King's Command), 1932
- Puwit ng Baso (Glass Bottom), 1932
- Kapulungan ng mga Pinagpala (Meeting of the Blessed People), 1932

=== Plays ===
- Utos-Hari (King's Command), 1935, stage adaptation of Francisco's short story, Utos-Hari
- Ang Ikaapat na Mago (The Fourth Mage), 1942
