= Federico Aguilar Alcuaz =

Filipino painter

Frederico Aguilar Alcuaz
- Born: June 6, 1932; Santa Ana, Manila, Philippine Islands
- Died: February 2, 2011 (aged 78); Manila, Philippines
- Resting place: Loyola Memorial Park Marikina, Philippines
- Occupation: Painter
- Spouse: Ute Schmitz (15 children)
- Awards: Order of National Artists of the Philippines

Federico Aguilar Alcuaz (Filipino: Federico Alcuaz Aguilar, June 6, 1932 – February 2, 2011) was a Filipino painter who exhibited extensively Internationally and whose work earned him recognition both in the Philippines and abroad.

Alcuaz was conferred the title of National Artist for Visual Arts, Painting, Sculpture and Mixed Media in 2009. However, four nominees for the award other than Alcuaz became embroiled in the 2009 National Artist of the Philippines Controversy, which led the Supreme Court of the Philippines to temporarily issue a status quo order on August 25, 2009, blocking the conferment of the awards on all seven nominees - despite the fact that no objections were ever raised regarding the conferment of the award to Alcuaz and two other nominees.

== Education and personal life ==
Federico Aguilar Alcuaz was born on June 6, 1932, in Santa Cruz, Manila. He was the 6th of 11 Children of Mariano Aguilar a Lawyer and a Musician and Encarnacion Alcuaz. He finished early schooling at the Dr. Albert Elementary School and San Beda High School. He studied law at the Ateneo de Manila and finished his degree in 1955. In 1949–1950 he took up painting subjects at the University of the Philippines (UP) School of Fine Arts. In 1955 he went to Madrid with a scholarship at the Academia de San Fernando which he got through the help of the Jesuits from the Ateneo de Manila. In 1956 he chose Barcelona as his career base. He also became a member of the La Punalada Group which counted among its members Tàpies, Cuixart and Tharrats. In the same year he began signing his paintings with Aguilar Alcuaz to distinguish himself from two other Aguilars who are also members of the La Punalada Group. In 1959, he met Ute Schmitz, whom he married 3 years later and they had 3 sons. He died on February 2, 2011, in Manila, Philippines due to natural causes.

== Awards ==
- 1st Prize, UPCFA Art Competition, 1953
- 1ST Prize, Roadside Squatters, 4th SNSAC Modern Painting Category, 1954
- 1st Prize, Montcada Award Barcelona, 1957
- Francisco Goya Award, Cercle Maillol Barcelona, 1958
- Republic Cultural Heritage Award, 1965
- 2nd Prize Prix Vancell, 4th Biennial of Terrassa (Barcelona Spain),1959

== Exhibitions (Philippines) ==
- Solo Exhibition, San Beda College, 1953
- Solo Exhibition, Centro Escolar University, 1954
- Solo Exhibition, PAG, 1955

== Exhibitions (international) ==
- Solo Exhibition, Museum of Contemporary Art, Madrid, 1956
- Solo Exhibition, Galerias Layetanas Barcelona, 1956
- Solo Exhibition, Galerias Manila Barcelona, 1956
- Solo Exhibition, Hispanic Cultural Hall Madrid, 1957
- Solo Exhibition, Galerias Layetanas Barcelona, 1957
- Solo Exhibition, Galeria Dintel, 1957
- Solo Exhibition, Galeria Dintel, 1958
- Exhibited at the Gallery of the City Hall of Burgos Spain, 1958
- Solo Exhibition, Asociacion Artistica Vizcaina Bilbao, 1959
- Solo Exhibition, Galeria Ilescas Bilbao, 1959
- Solo Exhibition, Galeria Ilescas Bilbao, 1960
- Solo Exhibition, Sala Vayreda Barcelona, 1960
- Solo Exhibition, Galeria Ilescas Bilbao, 1962
- Solo Exhibition, Galeria Ilescas Bilbao, 1972
- Solo Exhibition, Museo de Bellas Artes de Bilbao (tapices), 1973
- Solo Exhibition, Eindhoven (tapestries), 1973 (2)
