= Paglipas ng Dilim =

1920 zarzuela by Precioso Palma

A scene from the original 1920 version of the Philippine zarzuela, Paglipas ng Dilim

Paglipas ng Dilim ("After the Darkness") is a 1920 zarzuela – a Spanish lyric-dramatic genre – written in the Tagalog-language by Filipino playwright and novelist Precioso Palma. A three-act play, the music for the original version of Paglipas ng Dilim was composed by Filipino musician Leon Ignacio.

== Description ==
The play was described by Raul Asis in the "Guide/Theater" section of the Philippine Entertainment Portal (PEP) as an “amusing tale of twisted truths and of triumphant revelations”. According to Frederick R. Castro, a director of theatrical performances in the Philippines, Paglipas ng Dilim is a classic zarzuela, a stage presentation composed of scenes with dialogues, songs, and dances, that was performed multiple times in old theater houses in Manila. It was one of those plays that people watch even if the theater reached and exceeded full seating capacity, thus viewers had to stand during the entire presentation of the play.

== Style ==
The authors of Paglipas ng Dilim followed the standard outline or format of the traditional zarzuela. Palma and Ignacio followed the style of narration, form, plot presentation, setting, characters, and conflict that is appropriate for the conventional zarzuela.

== Characters ==
The main characters in Paglipas ng Dilim are Ricardo Makairog, Don Torcuato, Donya Carmen (also spelled as "Doña Carmen", meaning "[Honorable] Lady Carmen" in Spanish), Caridad, and Estrella. Ricardo Makairog is a bachelor who had just finished studying medicine. Don Torcuato and Donya Carmen is a boastful and socialite husband and wife who wanted to lure Makairog to become the husband of Caridad, their daughter. Estrella is the maiden being courted by Makairog.

== Plot ==
In the beginning of the story, a party is held by Ricardo Makairog after graduating from medical school. Among Makairog's guests were the family of Don Torcuato, the politician Don Juanito, and Estrella, the woman being courted by Makairog. Don Torcuato and his family are in financial trouble. In addition to this financial problem, Caridad - the daughter of Don Torcuato and Donya Carmen - was pregnant with Don Juanito's child. Thus, during Makairog's party, Don Torcuato, Donya Carmen, and Caridad started their scheme to persuade Makairog to become Caridad's fiancé. In one of the scenes Don Torcuato's family was able to make the guests think that Caridad and Makairog were having a secret and romantic relationship.

Don Torcuato's family continued with their plans and trickery during a picnic - another gathering - hosted by Makairog. During the picnic, Caridad was able to make Makairog drink a lot of champagne. While Makairog was drunk, Caridad announced to the guests that she and Makairog are planning to get married. Estrella, the woman who Makairog truly loves, became depressed after hearing Caridad's announcement.

During another gathering - a birthday party for a character named Maring - Makairog was finally able to explain to Estrella and the other guests what really happened during the picnic, and that Caridad was lying about the supposed nuptial. Don Torcuato and his family were also present at the birthday party. Their plan of making Makairog a "scapegoat" for Caridad's pregnancy was exposed. After this revelation, Don Torcuato's family left the party in shame.

After the episode of "darkness" in their relationship, Makairog and Estrella were married at the end of the play.

== Analysis ==
According to Frederick R. Castro, Paglipas ng Dilim is Based on Philippine history, the so-called Western lifestyle and standards of living were brought by foreigners, particularly the people from Spain and the United States. The Philippines had been a colony of Spain, and then a territory of the United States, before gaining independence. During the 1900s, foreign influences were considered by patriotic Filipinos as a form of non-adherence to Filipino nationalism. Apart from nationalism, Paglipas ng Dilim tackled the lifestyle of the Filipinos, the way of thinking of the Filipinos, and the socio-economic issues of the Philippines during the early part of the 1900s.

== Modern-day rendition ==
A 2009 version of Paglipas ng Dilim was performed by the University of the East Drama Company (UEDC) at the UP Theater in Diliman, Quezon City, Philippines from 4 to 6 February 2009. The 2009 remake of the play was directed by Frederick R. Castro. Formed in the 1970s, the University of the East Drama Company was the official student theater organization of the University of the East. UEDC presented the 2009 version of Paglipas ng Dilim during the nationwide celebration of the zarzuela festival in the Philippines known as "Sarsuwela Festival 2009". Sarsuwela Festival 2009 was the first "festival of zarzuelas" in the Philippines, and was initiated by Philippine National Artist Virgilio Almario and the UP College of Arts and Letters. The zarzuela festival was supported by the National Commission for Culture and the Arts and the UP Committee for Culture and the Arts.

== See also ==
- Walang Sugat
