= Precioso Palma =

Filipino novelist and playwright

Precioso Palma was a novelist and playwright in the Philippines. He wrote the novel Ipaghiganti Mo Ako…! ("Avenge Me…!"). He also authored the 1919 zarzuela entitled Paglipas ng Dilim ("After the Darkness").

== Filmography ==
Year	Title	Role	Film Distributor	Date Released
1938	Madaling Araw		Sampaguita Pictures	October 11–25, 1938
1938-1939	Dahong Lagas		Sampaguita Pictures	December 30, 1938 – January 6, 1939
1939	Lagot na Kuwintas		Sampaguita Pictures	February 24, 1939
1939	Ang Magsasampaguita		Sampaguita Pictures	November 22–29, 1939
1939-1940	Takip-Silim		Sampaguita Pictures	December 28, 1939 – January 5, 1940
1940	Lambingan		Sampaguita Pictures	July 7–16, 1940
1940	Nang Mahawi ang Ulap		Sampaguita Pictures	November 28 – December 4, 1940
