= Severino Reyes =

Filipino writer, playwright, and director of plays (1861–1942)

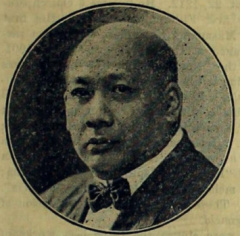
- Severino Reyes depicted in a 1924 book
- Born: February 11, 1861; Santa Cruz, Manila, Captaincy General of the Philippines
- Died: September 15, 1942 (aged 81); Manila, Philippine Commonwealth
- Resting place: Parish of the Immaculate Heart of Mary Columbarium, Antipolo, Rizal
- Education: Colegio de San Juan de Letran; University of Santo Tomas
- Occupation: Writer
- Spouse(s): Paz Puato; Juanita Ángeles
- Children: 17 including Pedrito
- Writing career
- Pen name: Lola Basyang
- Language: Tagalog
- Genre: Plays
- Notable works: Mga Kuwento ni Lola Basyang; Walang Sugat

Severino Reyes y Rivera (February 11, 1861 – September 15, 1942) was a Filipino writer and playwright. He used the pen name Lola Basyang. He was nicknamed "Don Binoy".

== Early life and education ==
Severino Reyes was born on February 11, 1861, in Santa Cruz, Manila during the Spanish colonial era to Rufino Reyes and Andrea Rivera. He pursued his early education in an institution owned by Catalino Sanchez and acquired a bachelor's degree at the Escuela de Segunda Enseñanza of the Colegio de San Juan de Letran. He also attended the University of Santo Tomas to pursue a degree in Philosophy.

== Career ==
Reyes wrote 26 zarzuelas and 22 dramas in his career. He is known as the "Father of Tagalog Plays" and as the "Father of the Tagalog Zarzuela".

He took a clerical job at the Tesoreria General de Hacienda as a means to avoid getting enlisted into the Spanish Army to fight against the Moros in Mindanao and Sulu. However he quit the job and decided to set up a store at Calle Ascarraga after he struggled supporting his family with low income he got from his old job.

The Gran Compania de Zarzuela Tagala was established in 1902 by Reyes, also directing zarzuellas himself for the group. The first one-act piece of the troupe, Ang Kalupi premiered at Zorrilla Theatre in April 1902. On June 14, 1902, Zarzuela Tagala staged Walang Sugat a drama set in Bulacan during the Philippine Revolution. Still on the same year, Reyes staged the R.I.P (Requiescat in Pace) in Manila. His other Tagalog-language zarzuelas include Minda Mora, Mga Bihag ni Cupido, Ang Bagong Fausto, Ang Tunay na Hukom, Ang Tatlong Bituin, Margaritang Mananahi, Ang Halik ng Isang Patay and Luha ng Kagalakan. The program of his plays was also exhibited by Governor-General William Howard Taft at the St. Louis World Exposition and the Panama Pacific International Exposition Reyes also collaborated with some of the well-known composers in the Philippines such as Jose Estella, producing works such as zarzuela Filipinas para los Filipinos (1905), and other zarzuelas like the Opera Ytaliana (1908).

Reyes helped found the Liwayway magazine in 1922, where he published Mga Kuwento ni Lola Basyang a series of short stories. He used the titular character Lola Basyang as his pen name and the work became the magazine's most widely read feature.

== Works ==
- Walang Sugat
- R.I.P (Requiescat in Pace)
- Mga Bihag ni Cupido
- Ang Tunay na Hukom
- Kalye Pogi
- Ang Halik ni Hudas
- Cablegrama Fatal
- Puso ng Isang Pilipina
- Ang Bagong Fausto
- Filotea, o Ang Pag-aasawa ni San Pedro
- Opera Italiana
- San Lazaro
- Alamat ng Lamok

== Personal life ==
Reyes married his childhood friend Maria Paz Puato with whom he had 17 children. He spoke both Tagalog and Spanish, and understood Latin, Greek, Hebrew, and various Philippine languages aside from Tagalog.

== Death ==
Severino died on September 15, 1942 in Manila due to Parkinson's disease in World War 2.

== Legacy ==
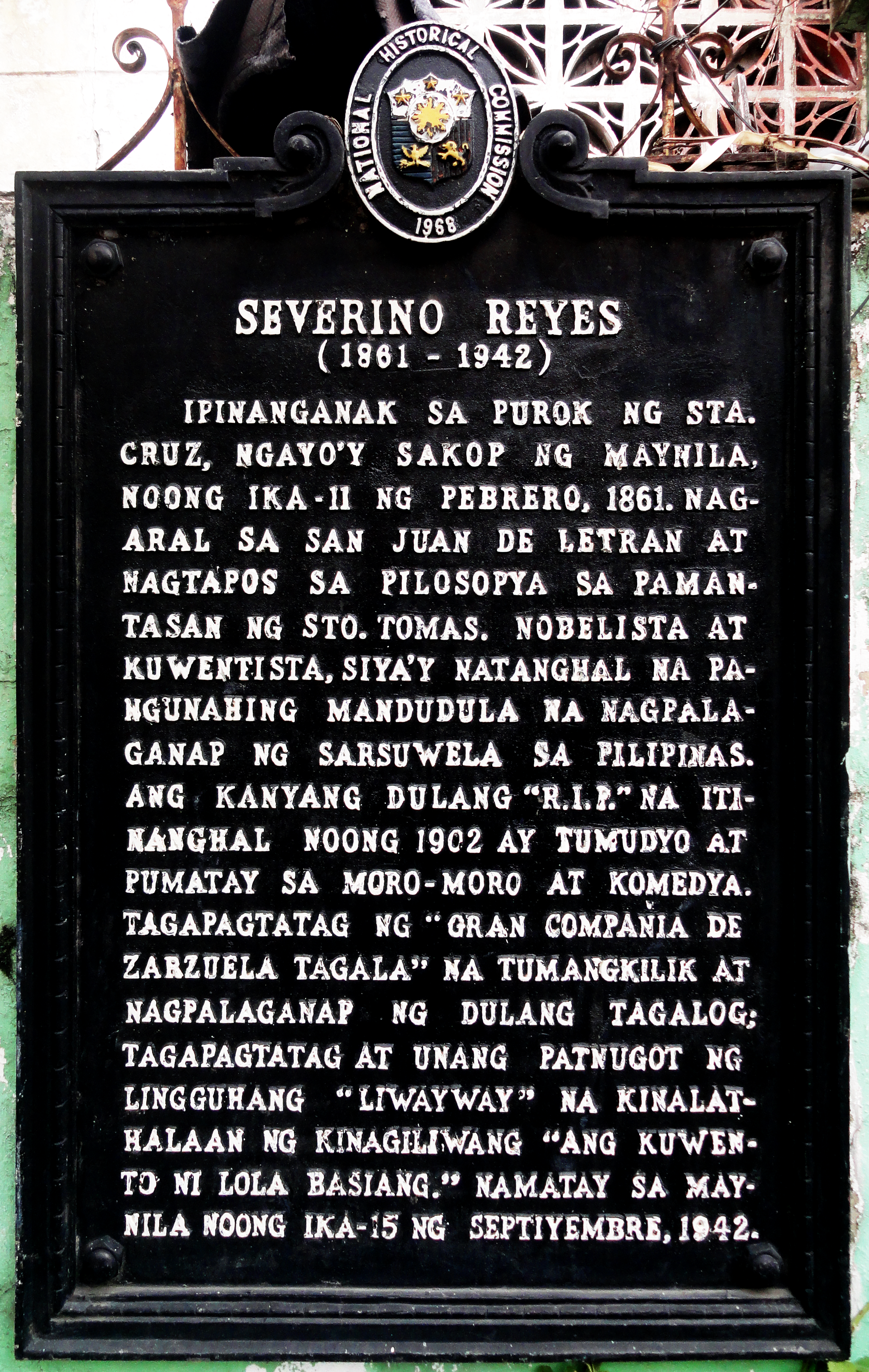
NHI Historical Marker

The National Historical Commission granted him a historical marker on September 1969, installed at the front of his house in Santa Cruz in the street renamed after him. On February 11, 2022, Reyes was honored with a Google Doodle in commemoration of his 161st birthday.
