= Salvador Bernal (artist) =

Filipino National Artist for theater and design (1945–2011)

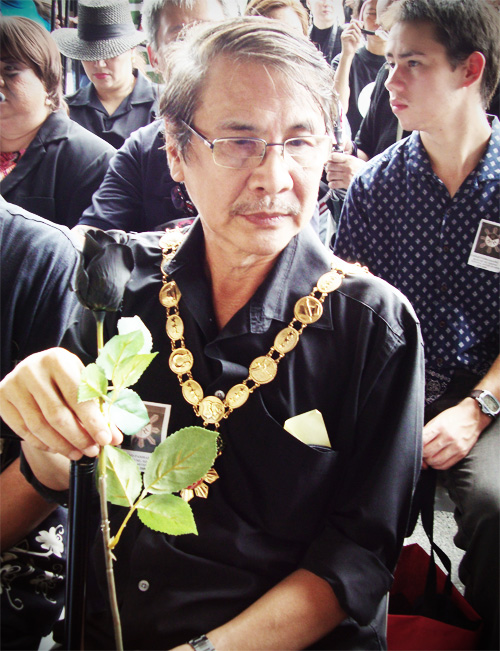
- Bernal at a National Artist award protest in August 7, 2009
- Born: Salvador Floro Bernal; January 7, 1945; Dagupan, Philippines
- Died: October 26, 2011 (aged 66); Quezon City, Philippines
- Occupation(s): Art; Film; Music
- Years active: 1969–2001
- Awards: Order of National Artists of the Philippines

Salvador Floro Bernal (January 7, 1945 – October 26, 2011) was an artist from the Philippines.

Bernal's career began in 1969. His output included over 300 productions in art, film and music, and earned him the award of National Artist for Theater and Design in 2003. He earned a philosophy degree in 1966 from the Ateneo de Manila University where he would later teach literature and stage design.

Bernal organized the Philippine Association of Theatre Designers and Technicians (Patdat) in 1995, through which he introduced Philippine theater design to the world.

The book “Salvador F. Bernal: Designing the Stage” by Nicanor G. Tiongson, is a comprehensive review of Bernal's work as designer for theater, with over 200 full-color photographs of his sketches, models, and actual costumes and sets complementing the text.
