= Zorrilla Theatre =

Former theatre in Manila, Philippines

- Teatro Circo de Zorrilla
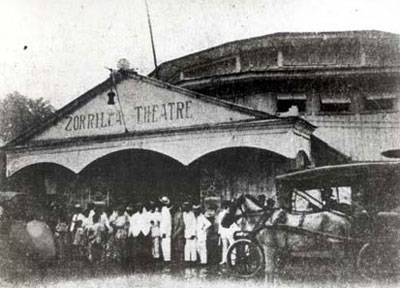
- The theater in 1917
- Location: Manila, Philippines
- Capacity: 1,352

Construction
- Opened: August 17, 1893
- Demolished: 1936

The Zorrilla Theatre (Spanish: Teatro Circo de Zorrilla) was a prominent theater in Manila, Philippines which open in 1893, and demolished in 1936.

== History ==
Once located along Calle Iris (now a part of C.M. Recto Avenue), Manila, the Zorrilla Theatre was named after José Zorrilla (1817–1893), a Spanish poet and playwright.

The building officially opened on August 17, 1893, and it was the venue for Spanish-language and Tagalog-language stage performances. The inaugural show was the Spanish-language one-act zarzuela, El diablo mundo on October 25, 1893 by Peninsulares Filipinos Emilio and Rafael del Val, and music by Insulares Filipino Jose Estella.

However, the Zorrilla Theatre's opening came during the introduction of electricity in the Philippines. On September 23, 1894, a circular mandated theaters to immediately install electric lights. The theater owners faced financial challenges in compliance. The theatre was eventually closed sometime in 1896 with the last scheduled program prior to the Philippine Revolution was Sobrinas del Capitan Grant March 7, 1896.

By 1901, the Zorilla Theatre is operational again. The theatre was demolished in 1936.

== Facilities ==
It consisted of a circular hall which accommodated 1,352 people—900 people in the galeria (general admission), 400 in the butaca (orchestra seats), 48 in tiered palcos (box), and four in the palco de honor.

== Events ==
Date(s)	Performers	Event	Notes	Ref.
October 25, 1893	Emilio and Rafael del Val	El diablo mundo	First event, Zarzuela	
September 12, 1894	Maria and Lucia Gavallini	"Farewell concert"		
December 3, 1894	—N/a	El duo de la africana	Zarzuela	
December 3, 1894	—N/a	Cadiz	Zarzuela	
1895	Anton de Kontski	Concert	Instrumental and vocal	

== See also ==
- Manila Grand Opera House
