= Magkaisa =

Song by Virna Lisa

from the album Magkaisa - A Tribute to the Filipino People
- Released: 1986
- Recorded: March 1, 1986
- Studio: Tasha Recording Studio
- Length: 5:27
- Label: Ivory Records
- Songwriter: Tito Sotto

"Magkaisa" (Tagalog for "unite") is a 1986 Filipino pop song by Virna Lisa (real name: Virna Lisa Loberiza) and composed by Tito Sotto. It is notable for being one of three iconic songs of the 1986 People Power Revolution, alongside Handog ng Pilipino sa Mundo and the patriotic kundiman and protest anthem, Bayan Ko.

== Writing and recording ==
Sotto wrote the song over the course of three days, together with arranger Homer Flores and record producer Ernie dela Peña. The backup singers were Babsie Molina, Bambi Bonus, and Vic Sotto. Virna Lisa recorded the song at Tasha Recording Studio in Libis, Quezon City, on the evening of March 1, 1986, less than a week after the revolution.

== Reception ==
The song was greatly popular with the masses following its release, mere days after the revolution ousted President Ferdinand Marcos and drove his family to exile in Hawaiʻi on 25 February 1986.

It was a big hit when played on radio stations, and its accompanying music video aired on major television stations nationwide a month after the revolution.

== Significant covers ==
Sarah Geronimo sang the song on August 5, 2009 at the funeral of President Corazon Aquino, who came to power after the toppling of the Marcos regime. Geronimo’s version is on the album Paalam, Maraming Salamat Pres. Aquino: A Memorial Tribute Soundtrack by Star Music.

Regine Velasquez sang her version in 2011 during the Tatak EDSA 25 concert along White Plains Avenue, Quezon City, as part of silver jubilee celebrations for the revolution.

== See also ==
- Handog ng Pilipino sa Mundo, another song related to the 1986 EDSA Revolution.
