= Pilipinas Kong Mahal =

Song by Francisco Santiago

English: My Philippines, My Philippines
- Patriotic song of Philippines
- Lyrics: Ildefonso Santos
- Music: Francisco Santiago, 1931
- Published: 1931

Pilipinas Kong Mahal (English: Philippines, My Philippines) is one of the most popular patriotic songs in the Philippines. The song was composed by Filipino musician, Francisco Santiago and lyrics by Ildefonso Santos.

The English lyrics, Philippines, My Philippines, was written by Prescott Ford Jernegan. The tune was adapted from the former U.S. state anthem, Maryland, My Maryland, itself a set to the German Christmas carol, O Tannenbaum. Santiago revised the melody, and Santos translated the Jernegan text into Filipino.

In the Philippines, patriotic songs are often sung by people at political rallies, protests and demonstrations. These are sung in patriotic dramas, choral performances, or dances, especially in schools during Araw ng Kalayaan (Independence Day) celebrations in June, and Buwan ng Wika (Language Month) in August.

This patriotic song is usually sung during flag retreat ceremonies on Friday afternoons, and events held days other than a Monday.

== Lyrics ==
Official Filipino lyrics

Lupang sintang kinagisnan,

Pilipinas kong mahal. Dibdib at puso ko’y alay, Pilipinas kong mahal Ang dagat at dalatan mo’y nag-uutos upang ikaw ay lagi kong paglingkuran, Pilipinas kong mahal

Ang bayan ko'y tanging ikaw, Pilipinas kong mahal. Ang puso ko at buhay man, sa iyo'y ibibigay. Tungkulin ko’y gagampanan, na lagi kang paglingkuran. Ang laya mo'y babantayan, Pilipinas kong hirang.

Bayan sa silanga’y hiyas, Pilipinas kong mahal. Kami’y iyo hanggang wakas, Pilipinas kong mahal. Mga ninuno naming lahat, sa iyo’y naglingkod ng tapat. Ligaya mo’y aming hangad,

Pilipinas kong mahal.

Official English lyrics

Philippines, My Philippines

Text by Prescott Ford Jernegan

I love my own, my native land, Philippines, my Philippines, To thee I give my heart and hand, Philippines, my Philippines. The trees that crown thy mountains grand, The seas that beat upon thy strand, Awake my heart to thy command, Philippines, my Philippines.

Ye islands of the Eastern sea, Philippines, my Philippines, Thy people we shall ever be, Philippines, my Philippines. Our fathers lived and died in thee, And soon shall come the day when we Lie down with them at God’s decree, Philippines, my Philippines.

Yet still beneath thy ardent sky, Philippines, my Philippines, More num’rous sons shall live and die, Philippines, my Philippines. In them shall breathe the purpose high, The glorious day to bring more nigh, When all may sing without a sigh, Philippines, my Philippines.

Thy past has little known of peace, Philippines, my Philippines, From want and war without release, Philippines, my Philippines. Then speed the day when evils cease, And happiness for thee increase, The day of plenty and of peace,

Philippines, my Philippines.

== See also ==
- Philippine nationalism
- Bayan Ko ("My Country")
- Magkaisa ("Unite")
