= Leah Navarro =

Filipino singer

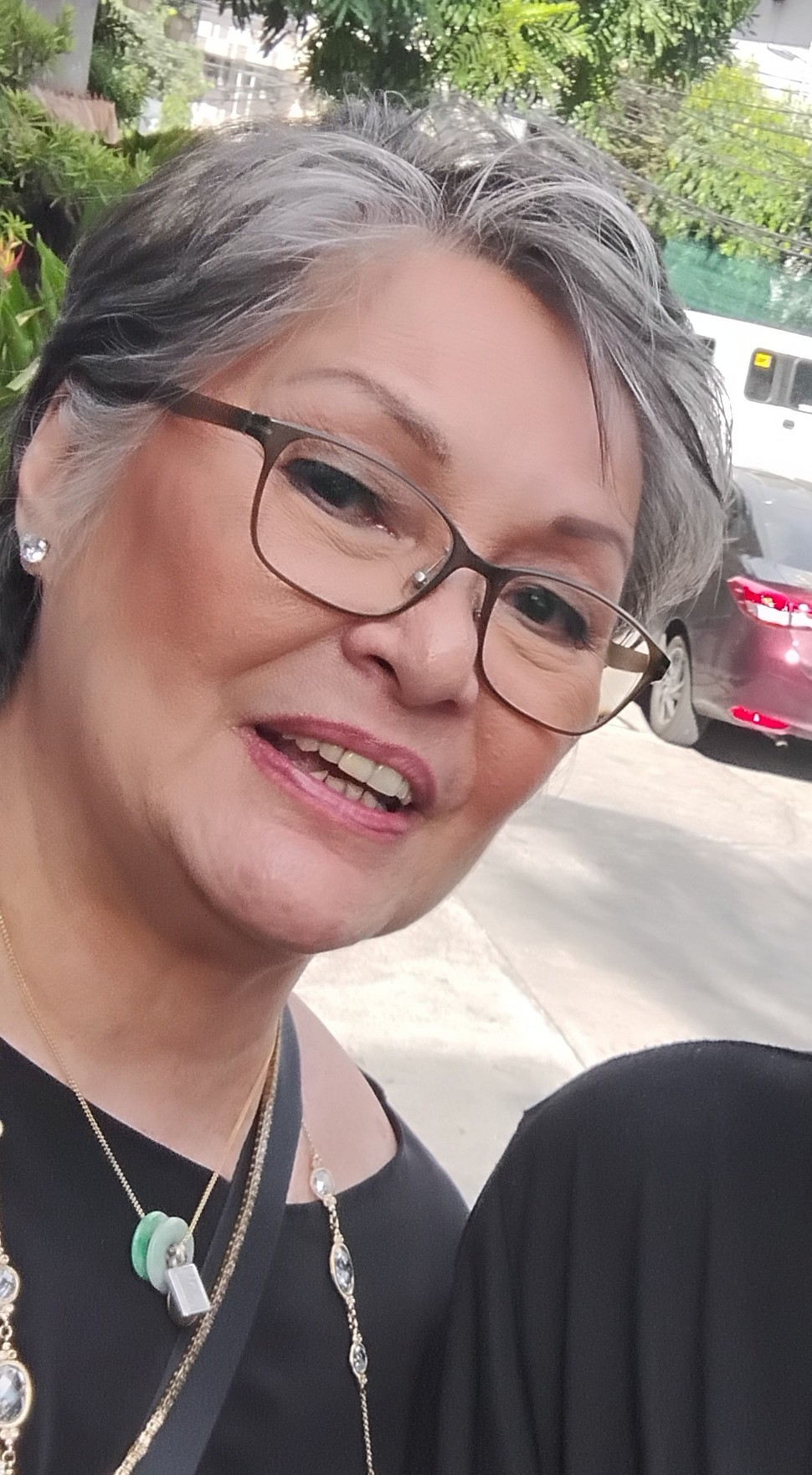

Background information
- Born: Leah Lopez Navarro
- Origin: Makati, Philippines
- Genres: Manila sound
- Instruments: Vocals
- Years active: 1977-present

Leah Lopez Navarro is a Filipino singer and activist. She was a prominent singer from late 1970s up to early 1980s. In April 1986, she was one among fifteen singers featured in the song, "Handog ng Pilipino sa Mundo" commemorating the People Power Revolution.

After moving to Toronto, Canada, and taking a hiatus, Navarro returned to the local music scene in 1997.

On December 2, 2024, Navarro and 16 others filed the first impeachment complaint against Vice President Sara Duterte, submitting 24 articles covering five of the six constitutional grounds for impeachment.

== Personal life ==
Navarro is the daughter of Jimmy Navarro, who served as program director of ABS-CBN upon its revival after the 1986 People Power Revolution.

She is also a cousin of broadcast journalist Pia Hontiveros, current Philippine senator Risa Hontiveros, and aunt of Barbie's Cradle lead Barbie Almalbis.

== Discography ==
=== Singles (as a solo artist) ===
- ふたりだけの愛 (Futaridake no Ai) (1978)
- 甘い蜜 (Amai Mitsu) (1978)
- "Kailangan Kita" (1978)
- "Ligaw Tingin" (1978)
- "Ang Pag-ibig Kong Ito" (1979)
- "Huwag Mo Pigilan" (1979)
- "Isang Mundo, Isang Awit" (1980)
- "Reach Out for a Friend" (1986)

=== As featured artist ===
- "You Ask for It, You Got It" (with Pabs Dadivas) (1980)
- "Lagi Na Lang" (with Basil Valdez)
- "Handog ng Pilipino sa Mundo" (1986)

=== Albums ===
- Leah (1978)
- Leah at Pag-Ibig (1980)
