= Death and funeral of Corazon Aquino =

2009 death of the 11th Philippine president

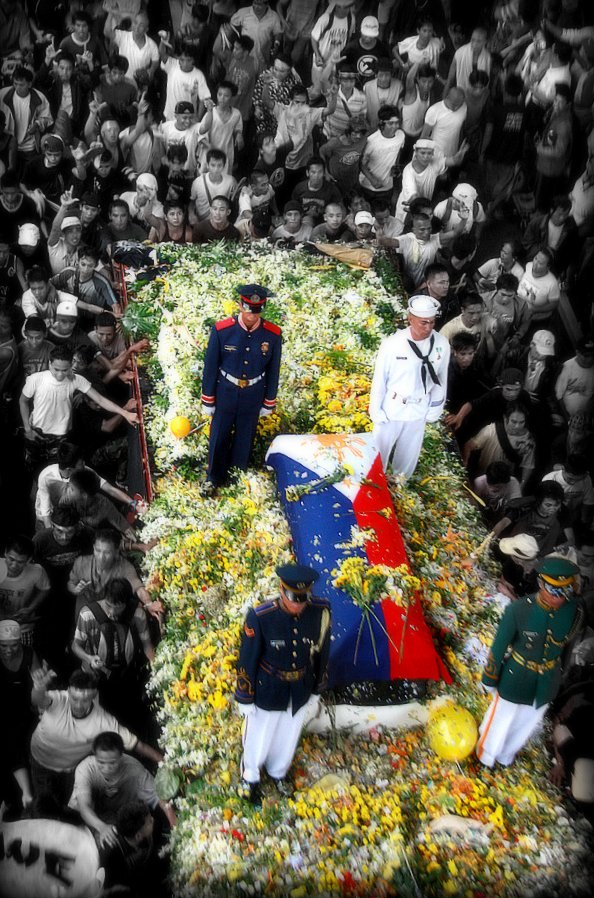
- Aquino's flag-draped casket borne on a red Isuzu 810 flatbed truck during the funeral procession. This was intentionally modelled after the funeral of her husband, Benigno Jr., 25 years prior.
- Date: August 1–5, 2009
- Location: Philippines
- Participants: People of the Philippines
- Outcome: National day of mourning and funeral procession Candidacy and subsequent election of Senator Benigno Aquino III in the 2010 election as President of the Philippines

Corazon Cojuangco-Aquino, the 11th president of the Philippines, died on August 1, 2009, at the Makati Medical Center in Makati of cardiorespiratory arrest after being in hospital since June 2009, and was first diagnosed with colorectal cancer in 2008.

The Aquino family declined an invitation by government to grant the former president a state funeral. Her funeral was held on August 5, 2009, and her body was buried at the Manila Memorial Park in Parañaque. She is the first woman and the second President and layman after Carlos P. Garcia to have their wake at the Manila Cathedral.

== Health ==
Ako'y nagpápasalamat sa inyong lahat at lalong-lalo na sa Panginoóng Diyos na ginawâ Niya akong isang Pilipino. Talagang karangalan ko iyon na maging katulad niyo at maraming salamat sa lahat ng tulong na ibinigay ninyo sa akin.

(I am thanking you all and especially the Lord God that He made me a Filipino. It was indeed my honor to be like unto you all, and many thanks for all the help that you all had given unto me.)

— Corazon Aquino, September 3, 2008

=== Diagnosis ===
In December 2007, Aquino experienced periodic fluctuations of blood pressure, difficulty in breathing, hair loss, loss of appetite and a remarkable drop in weight. Some days after, her physician informed the Aquino family that she had colon cancer, and by mid-March 2008, she confided the nature of her disease to a close friend, Rev Catalino Arévalo.

On March 24, 2008, her youngest daughter, television presenter and actress Kris Aquino, disclosed that her mother began to experience cancer symptoms before 2008, difficulty in breathing, persistent cough and loss of appetite. Her only brother, then-senator Benigno Aquino III, was at her side as she made the announcement. Kris also said that the March 19 result of her mother's ultrasound revealed the disease was primarily due to adenocarcinoma, where the cancer started on colon glands. Her spokesperson, Deedee Sytangco, said that her colon cancer was at stage four prior to discovery. While she had initially been informed by physicians that she had only three months to live. Aquino pursued chemotherapy.

Following the announcement, Malacañan Palace was saddened at the disclosure, while Senators Francis Escudero and Aquilino Pimentel Jr. also expressed their deepest sympathies.

Citizens were shocked because some days before, Aquino had made a public appearance at protests against the Arroyo government. She was known before her confinement to be an avid supporter of NBN-ZTE scandal primary witness Rodolfo Lozada Jr., and actively attended Masses and rallies for him. This included the "Mass for Truth and Accountability" novena that she helped organize, the first of which began on February 25–exactly 22 years after her accession as president at the height of the People Power Revolution. On March 23, 2008, during the sixth "Mass for Truth and Accountability" and the day before Kris' announcement, she was seen attending Easter Sunday Mass in Saint Joseph's College, Quezon City, where she thanked Lozada for "his courage and sacrifices for the campaign of truth."

On March 25 at approximately 6 PM PHT, Aquino was brought to Makati Medical Center, where she was prepared for chemotherapy. Her son, Benigno S. Aquino III, said that his mother would undergo such unspecified set of procedures before taking chemotherapy. Some sources at the hospital said that the former president would undergo colectomy, cardiopulmonary clearance and blood transfusion as prerequisites for the treatment.

Aquino had made some progress in April and her appetite returned. In public remarks made on May 13, 2008, Aquino herself announced that blood tests indicated that she was responding positively to the medical treatment.

By July 2009, however, she was reported to be in a very severe condition and kept in hospital due to loss of appetite and chronic baldness. It was announced that Aquino and her family had decided to discontinue the chemotherapy sessions and other medical intervention.

== Death ==
Aquino died in the Makati Medical Center, at the age of 76 on August 1, 2009, at 03:18 PHT due to cardiorespiratory arrest after complications of colorectal cancer.

Her son, Senator Benigno Aquino III, announced her death to the media at 5 AM. The Aquino family was then reported to have declined the government's invitation for a state funeral.

== Wake and funeral ==
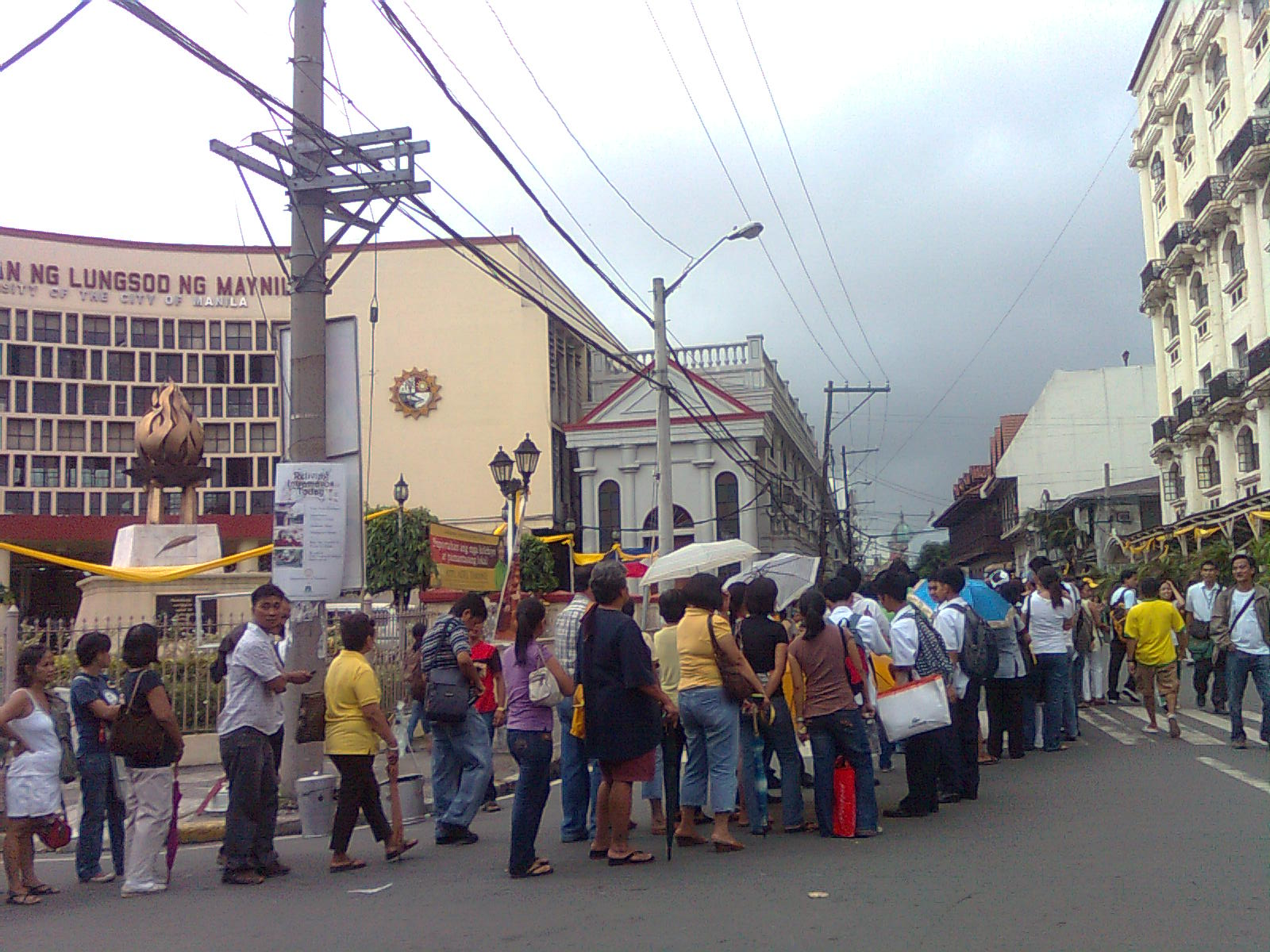
Queue for Aquino's wake at Manila Cathedral (its green cupola in background) in front of the Pamantasan ng Lungsod ng Maynila campus. The university offered mourners use of its facilities, such as its clinic and restrooms.

=== Wake ===
Aquino's casket initially lay in state at the St. Benilde Gymnasium of La Salle Green Hills in Mandaluyong, before it was transferred to Manila Cathedral on August 3 on a red Isuzu 810 flatbed truck with a handwriting in front saying "MAHAL KA NAMIN CORY (WE LOVE YOU CORY)". A crowd estimated at 120,000 witnessed the transfer of her remains from La Salle Green Hills to Manila Cathedral. Most mourners were concentrated at the Benigno Aquino Jr. memorial along Ayala Avenue, Makati, where the funeral procession paused briefly while the crowds sang "Bayan Ko".

The Church in the Philippines permitted Aquino to lie in state under the cathedral's crossing, making her the first woman and only the second layman after former President Carlos P. García to be given the honour, which is often reserved for a deceased Archbishop of Manila.

In a surprising gesture of civility, Representative Bongbong, his wife Liza and his sister former Representative Imee Marcos (the children of the Aquinos' bitter political rival, the late President and dictator Ferdinand Marcos) paid their last respects at the Cathedral on August 4. President Arroyo cut short her visit to the United States, and attended the wake in the early hours of Wednesday, August 5, where she spoke with Senator Aquino for about seven minutes. The Requiem Mass and interment were scheduled for later that day, which was declared as a special, non-working holiday by President Arroyo.

President José Ramos Horta of Timor-Leste – a personal friend of Aquino – was at the funeral. Also attending the wake was another of the late President's friends, Wan Azizah Wan Ismail, the wife of former Malaysian Deputy Prime Minister and oppositionist Anwar Ibrahim, who wore a yellow tudung for the occasion.

Roman Catholic dioceses across the country held their own Requiem Masses for Aquino, which replaced the initial "healing masses" intended for her recovery. Meanwhile, the government declared a week of national mourning for her death. As much as 7,000 mourners waited in line at the Manila Cathedral on August 4.

=== Requiem Mass and funeral ===
The Requiem Mass for Aquino was held on August 5, and was officiated by then-Balanga Bishop Socrates Villegas with then-Manila Archbishop Cardinal Gaudencio Rosales, along with more than a dozen other bishops and priests. Jesuit priest Catalino Arevalo, Aquino's personal friend and spiritual adviser delivered the homily.

José Mari Chan sang the poem Ninoy wrote for Cory, "I Have Fallen In Love," as Aquino's casket was borne up the nave of the cathedral. Other songs and hymns performed in tribute were "Sa 'Yo Lamang" (For You Alone) by Piolo Pascual; "The Lord's Prayer" by Erik Santos; "The Impossible Dream" by Jed Madela; and "Pangako" (Promise) by Ogie Alcasid. Martin Nievera and Regine Velasquez performed a duet of "The Prayer", while Sarah Geronimo sang the People Power Revolution anthem "Magkaisa" ("Unite"); "Your Heart Today" by Filipina singer Maria Teresa Abellare Llamedo Cruzata aka Dulce; "Hindi Kita Malilimutan" ("I Will Never Forget You") by Zsa Zsa Padilla; and "Bayan Ko" ("My Country") by Lea Salonga. The artists later joined the APO Hiking Society in singing another song from the 1986 People Power Revolution, "Handog ng Pilipino sa Mundo" ("The Gift of Filipinos to the World"). The Philippine Philharmonic Orchestra provided musical accompaniment for the service.

Aquino's flag-draped casket paused at the steps of Manila Cathedral for departure honours, after which a brass band performed four ruffles and flourishes and the national anthem. It was then mounted onto a red Isuzu 810 flatbed truck – similar to the one used for her husband's funeral a quarter century before – that was decked in white and yellow flowers arranged in an eight-rayed sunburst evoking the national flag, while the military band was playing "Bayan Ko". An honor guard of servicemen from the three branches of the Armed Forces — Army, Navy, Air Force — and the Philippine National Police stood vigil as the truck-hearse made its way around Plaza Roma fronting the cathedral, escorted by throngs of mourners.

The funeral process then exited Intramuros at Anda Circle and travelled along Bonifacio Drive and Roxas Boulevard, with the flag flying from Independence Flagpole at Luneta lowered to half staff in imitation of her husband's own funeral procession. The hearse made its way down Quirino Avenue, Osmeña Highway and the South Luzon Expressway, pausing briefly before the Ninoy Aquino Monument in Makati where crowds sang Bayan Ko and scattered yellow confetti, which was also done during anti-Marcos protests and her 1986 presidential campaign.

Aquino's casket arrived at the Manila Memorial Park in Parañaque, eight hours after leaving the cathedral. Her immediate family and close associates rode in a caravan of 13 coaches, while mourners and supporters in black and yellow marched beside the hearse and lined the route, chanting her name and flashing the Laban sign ("fight" made by holding the thumb and forefinger at right angles to form an "L"). The crowd that lined the funeral route that passed through Manila, Makati, Pasay, and Parañaque was estimated to be between 100,000 and 500,000 people.

When the cortege reached Manila Memorial, Aquino was given full military honors, with a two-star general acting as military host and eight, one-star generals as pallbearers. As is customary for a former Commander-in-Chief of the forces, her casket was transferred to a horse-drawn gun carriage for the short trip to the family's mausoleum where her husband Ninoy is interred.

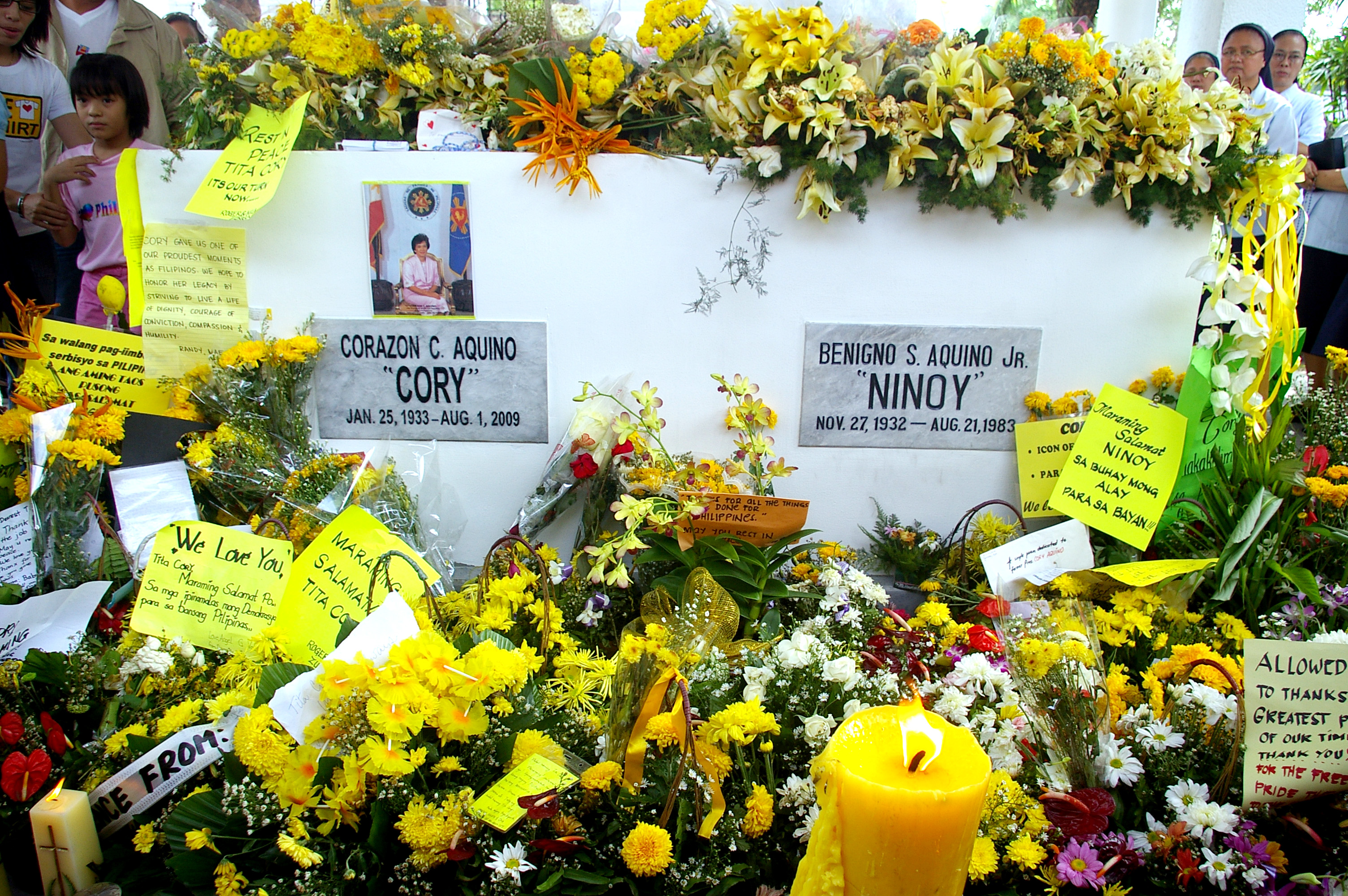
Corazon Aquino was buried beside her husband Ninoy at the Manila Memorial Park in Parañaque, Philippines, Her son Benigno Aquino III was later interred next to them.

Attendance at the burial were originally restricted to Aquino's family and close friends, but the crowd broke through the security barriers after the last of the convoy's buses entered the gates of Manila Memorial. Though the crowd was inside the memorial park, they maintained a respectful distance from the mausoleum.

Bishop Socrates Villegas and Catalino Arévalo gave the final blessing, and as per the family's request, the casket was opened one last time. The plate glass was removed, and after the priests and the Aquino siblings sprinkled the former president's body with holy water, family members queued to give her a parting kiss. The casket was then sealed, the flag was removed, and a final military salute given, with the folded flag presented to Senator Aquino. The pallbearers then pushed the casket into the tomb to the applause of the crowd, after which mourners placed white and yellow flowers inside. As the tomb was being sealed, the congregation sang Bayan Ko again, followed by several Catholic hymns.

Aquino's grave marker is in the same style as her husband's: a simple, gray marble plaque with her name, nickname, and the dates of birth and death inscribed in black.

== Reaction ==
=== Domestic ===
President Gloria Macapagal Arroyo, who was on a state visit in Washington, D.C. when she was informed about the President Aquino's death, called Aquino a "national treasure". She cut her trip short to return to Manila for Aquino's wake. Arroyo also announced a 10-day mourning period for the former president, and issued Administrative Order No. 269 authorizing "official acts and observances" to help in the funeral.

Former President Joseph Estrada said that the country has lost a "mother" and a "guiding voice of the people", and described Aquino as "Philippines' most loved woman". Aquino supported Estrada's removal from office in 2001, but the two supported each other to oppose amendments in the constitution since last year. The Senate has also expressed its grieving with Aquino's death; Senate President Juan Ponce Enrile, who along with Fidel Ramos launched the People Power Revolution, asked the public to pray for her. Minority leader Aquilino Pimentel Jr., who previously served as interior and local government secretary during her administration, had "mixed feelings" with Aquino's death, saying "We shall be forever indebted to Cory for rallying the nation behind the campaign to topple dictatorial rule and restore democracy."

An opinion among some Roman Catholics in the country was to push for Aquino's canonization as a saint of the Roman Catholic Church.

=== International reaction ===
President of Russia Dmitry Medvedev in a telegram to President of the Philippines Gloria Macapagal Arroyo stated, "The name of Corazon Aquino is associated with a period of profound reforms and the democratic transformation of Filipino society." Medvedev also noted that Corazon Aquino showed great interest and sympathy to Russia and prioritized the development of Russian-Filipino relations. International figures expressed their grief, with United States Secretary of State Hillary Clinton noting that Aquino was "admired by the world for her extraordinary courage". White House Press Secretary Robert Gibbs said that "Her courage, determination, and moral leadership serve as an inspiration to us all and exemplify the best in the Filipino nation." Other ambassadors also sent their messages of condolence following her death. Pope Benedict XVI recalled Aquino as a "courageous commitment to the freedom of the Filipino people, her firm rejection of violence and intolerance," according to Manila Archbishop Cardinal Gaudencio Rosales. President of South Africa Jacob Zuma called Aquino "a great leader who set a shining example of peaceful transition to democracy in her country." Queen Elizabeth II of the United Kingdom said, "I am saddened to hear of the death of Corazon 'Cory' Aquino the former President of the Republic of the Philippines." She then added "I send my sincere condolences to her family and to the people of the Philippines."

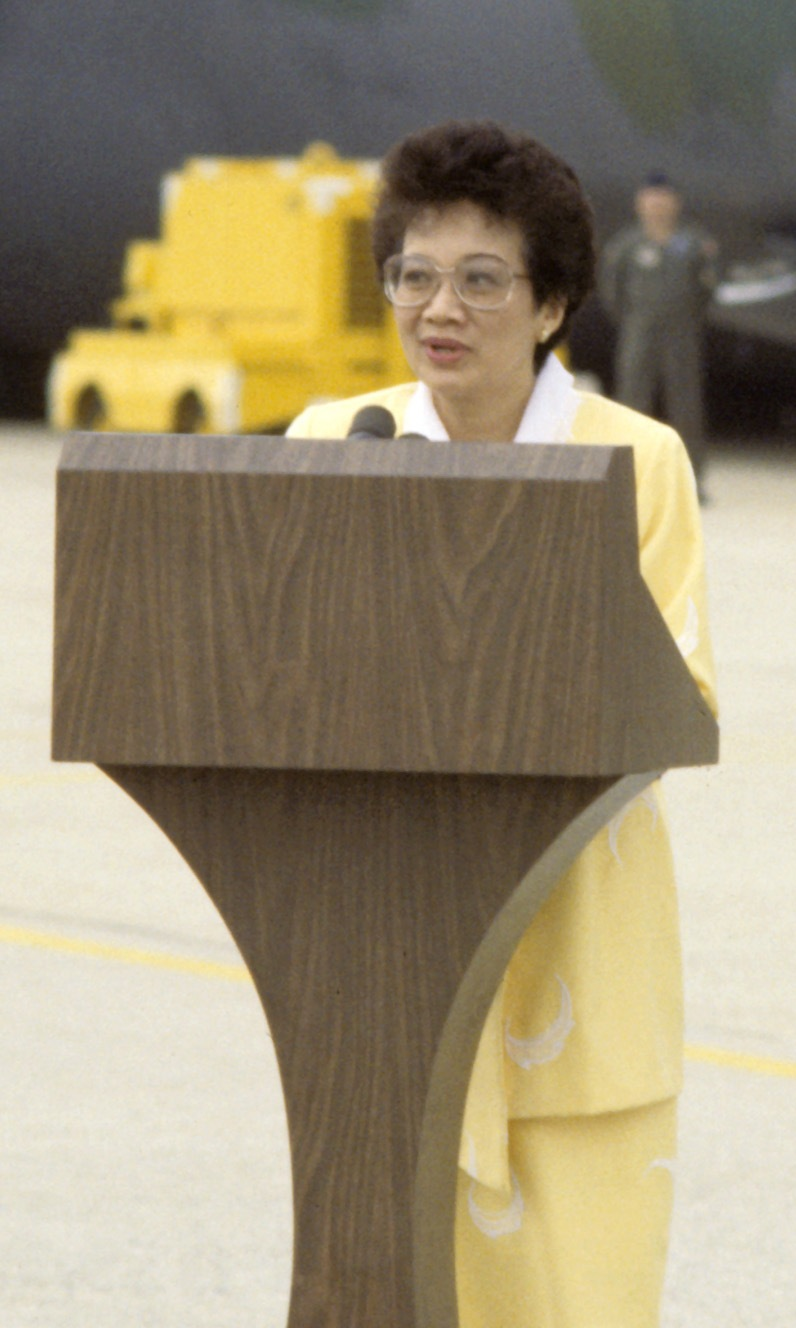
Cory Aquino during a ceremony honoring US Air Force

Diplomats from South Africa, Brazil, Turkey, United Kingdom, Iran, Cuba, Sri Lanka, Vietnam, Sweden, Thailand, Iraq, Japan, Saudi Arabia, Venezuela, Libya, Mexico, France, and Pakistan, among others, and the representative of the International Organization for Migration (IOM) attended the wake of the former president.

- Brazil – Brazilian Ambassador Alcides G.R. Prates offered his country's condolences to Aquino family and the Filipino people.
- Canada – Canadian Ambassador Robert Desjardins said Aquino has been recognized internationally for her contributions to human rights and political freedoms, values that Canada strongly shares with the Philippines, adding that she will be sincerely missed by the international community, and people everywhere, including the 300,000 Canadians of Filipino origin.

The government and the people of Canada would like to extend our deepest sympathy to the Filipino people. President Aquino will be remembered as a leader who ushered in a new era of freedom in the Philippines, and inspired millions around the world. She was an international icon of democracy, a global model of people power, and a passionate advocate of good governance.

— Robert Desjardins, Ambassador of the Canadian Embassy in the Philippines

- Chile – Chile's Ambassador to the Philippines Ovid Harasich was also at the wake and hailed Aquino for her important role in bringing democracy back in the country. He said the people of Chile were saddened by Aquino's demise.
- China – The Embassy of China has issued the following statement:

We are deeply saddened on hearing the news that former President Corazon Cojuangco Aquino passed away early this morning. The Philippines lost an inspiring statesman while China, in sharp grief, bereaved of a sincere friend. President Aquino made great efforts in developing China-Philippine friendly relations. Her vision would be remembered and her contribution would be long cherished by China and the Chinese people. May she rest in peace.

— Hu Jintao, President of China

Chinese Ambassador Liu Jianchao also recalled his meeting with Cory in 1988, when the Liu was serving as a junior diplomat under China's Ministry of Foreign Affairs.

She was the first head of state that I met in my lifetime and I was very impressed with her grace and courage in developing bilateral relations between our countries. I am very grateful for what she did.

— Liu Jianchao, Ambassador of China to the Philippines

- East Timor – East Timor President José Ramos-Horta, a long-time friend of Aquino, broke protocol when he came to Manila to attend the funeral. Diplomats looked down on the gesture for heads of state given the fact that it was not a state funeral. Ramos-Horta braved a downpour and arrived on Wednesday morning in time for the funeral mass at Manila Cathedral. However, he had to proceed to Manila Memorial Park in Parañaque ahead of the mourners because he could not sit for long hours due to the wound he sustained from an attempt on his life in East Timor in 2008.

I'm always impressed by leaders who showed compassion and humility. To me, there is no greater quality in a leader than being compassionate and being humble because only through compassion and humility that one can bridge the divide, build bridges of dialogue between communities and between warring sections... No amount of intellect or academic record can replace compassion and humility that was Cory Aquino... Cory Aquino, through her compassion and humility, inspired me.

— José Ramos-Horta, President of East Timor

- European Union – Ambassador Alistair MacDonald of the delegation of the European Commission to the Philippines led the European Union in expressing grief over the death of Aquino.

Throughout her presidential term, and notwithstanding a number of severe challenges, she never flinched in her determination to ensure that the Philippines would not veer from its democratic path.

— Alistair MacDonald, Ambassador of the European Union Commission to the Philippines

- Finland – Finnish Ambassador Heikki Hannikainen said that Cory's leadership led to a new era of hope and promise to Filipinos.
- Hong Kong – A representative of the territory's Chief Executive Donald Tsang went to the Philippine Consulate to write in the book of condolences.
- Indonesia – President Susilo Bambang Yudhoyono of the Philippines' nearest neighbor Indonesia said in a statement he was saddened by the news and offered his heartfelt condolences.
- Japan – Prime Minister Taro Aso hailed Aquino's contribution to friendly ties between the two countries:

We would like to sincerely renew our deep respect for her achievement.

— Taro Aso, Prime Minister of Japan

- Malaysia – The wife of Malaysian opposition leader Anwar Ibrahim, Wan Azizah, arrived in Manila on the Sunday of the funeral to pay tribute to former Philippine president Corazon Aquino:

Now that she is gone, I feel grief and the loss not only for the Filipinos but for myself.

— Wan Azizah

The Malaysian people have a special reason to view her as an iconic figure. Their striving for a return of their country to the dispensation entrusted to it by its founding Constitution mirrors hers and Ninoy's successful struggle to return the Filipino nation to the promise of Jose Rizal's legacy.

— Anwar Ibrahim, Leader of the Opposition of Malaysia and former Deputy Prime Minister

- Russia – President Dmitry Medvedev in a telegram to Gloria Macapagal Arroyo stated:

The name of Corazon Aquino is associated with a period of profound reforms and the democratic transformation of Filipino society.

— Dmitry Medvedev, President of Russia

Medvedev also noted that Corazon Aquino showed great interest and sympathy to Russia and prioritized the development of Russian-Filipino relations.

- Singapore – Singapore, in a statement from the Foreign Ministry, lauded her as "a remarkable woman" who worked tirelessly for the betterment of the Philippines.
- South Korea – Former President Kim Dae-Jung recounted to the Philippine Embassy how the 1986 People Power Revolution that catapulted Aquino to power inspired similar democratic movements worldwide, including his country's own venture into democracy in 1987 following massive rallies.
- Switzerland – Swiss Ambassador Peter Sutter said that Mrs. Aquino conquered the hearts of the Swiss people when she visited Switzerland in June 1988.

As champion of democracy, she will remain an inspiration to us all.

— Peter Sutter, Ambassador of Switzerland to the Philippines

- Thailand – Thailand has sent condolences on the death of former president Aquino who died Saturday after a yearlong battle with colon cancer. In his message to Philippine President Gloria Arroyo, Prime Minister Abhisit Vejjajiva said his government and the people of Thailand have learned with "deep sadness and join the Republic of the Philippines in mourning of the demise of Her Excellency Corazon Aquino."

Her Excellency Aquino's contributions to the development of the country and tireless devotion to peace, stability and democracy for the people of the Republic of the Philippines are well recognized throughout the world and will always be remembered and cherished by all of us with admiration and respect.

— Abhisit Vejjajiva, Prime Minister of Thailand

- United Kingdom – The British Government has extended its condolences to the family of the late President through Foreign Office Minister Ivan Lewis.

Former Foreign Office Minister, Lord Malloch-Brown, who worked closely with Mrs Aquino during her election campaign added:

I received the news of Corazon Aquino's death with great sadness. As an advisor in her campaign against President Marcos, the privilege of working with Cory and watching her was one of my life's greatest lessons in courage, leadership, the art of politics and humanity. The way she and all her family made such friends of me as an outsider is something I have always treasured.

— Lord Malloch-Brown

British Ambassador to the Philippines Peter Beckingham also said:

I had the honour and pleasure of meeting former President Aquino on several occasions, when we were able to discuss her visits to London and her interests in members of the Filipino community in Britain, especially those serving in the Church. Those discussions left me with an overwhelming sense of her grace, charisma and compassion. The Philippines has lost a wonderful leader who is widely admired in Britain for her courage and inspiration.

— Peter Beckingham, Ambassador of the United Kingdom to the Philippines

Her Majesty Queen Elizabeth II also mourns Cory's death and said:

I am saddened to hear of the death of Corazon 'Cory' Aquino the former President of the Republic of the Philippines. I send my sincere condolences to her family and to the people of the Philippines.

— Queen Elizabeth II

- United Nations – United Nations World Food Program Country Director Stephen Anderson said that:

She was the beacon of democracy for this country and for the world. She was very much committed to helping those who are disadvantaged and her legacy remains. We're very sad for her family's loss but what she represents is an inspiration to the world.

— Stephen Anderson, WFP

UN Secretary-General Ban Ki-moon voiced his deep sadness over the passing of former Philippine President Corazon Aquino. Ban paid tribute to the former president for her "exceptional courage and pivotal role in the restoration and consolidation of democracy in the Philippines," which she governed from 1986 to 1992.

Mrs. Aquino will be remembered as a beacon of democracy not only in the Philippines but also around the world.

— Ban Ki-moon, Secretary-General of the United Nations

- United States – According to White House Press Secretary Robert Gibbs, President Barack Obama was deeply saddened by the death of President Aquino.

Ms. Aquino played a crucial role in Philippines history, moving the country to democratic rule through her non-violent "People Power" movement over twenty years ago. Her courage, determination, and moral leadership are an inspiration to us all and exemplify the best in the Filipino nation. On behalf of the American people, the President extends his deepest condolences to the Aquino family and the nation of the Philippines".

— Robert Gibbs, White House Press Secretary

U.S. Secretary of State Hillary Clinton and Former U.S. President Bill Clinton expressed their condolences and said that they were "inspired by her quiet strength and her unshakable commitment to justice and freedom".
U.S. Ambassador to the Philippines Kristie A. Kenney said in a statement:

On behalf of the U.S. Embassy, I would like to express our most heartfelt condolences to the Aquino family and to the people of the Philippines on the death of former President Corazon Aquino.

— Kristie Kenney, US Ambassador to the Philippines

- Vatican City – According to the Cardinal Secretary of State, Tarcisio Bertone, Pope Benedict XVI recalled Corazon Aquino's "courageous commitment to the freedom of the Filipino people." He remembered her "as a woman of deep and unwavering faith".

=== Internet ===
- On the day of Aquino's funeral, Friendster created a special profile page that allowed users to become a fan of the former president.
- On the week of Aquino's death, she became a trending topic on the social networking site Twitter. Users were also able to add yellow ribbons to their pictures to symbolize Aquino.
