= Ildefonso P. Santos Jr. =

Filipino architect (1929–2014)

Ildefonso Paez Santos Jr.
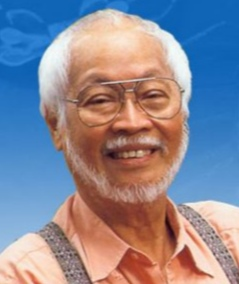
- Ildefenso P. Santos from the Order of National Artists (NCCA)
- Born: September 5, 1929; Malabon, Rizal, Philippine Islands
- Died: January 29, 2014 (aged 84); Manila, Philippines
- Resting place: St. Alphonsus Mary de Liguori Parish Church, Makati City
- Education: University of Santo Tomas; University of Southern California
- Occupation: Architect
- Awards: Order of National Artists of the Philippines (2006); Patnubay ng Kalinangan; Parangal ng Bayan (1988); Outstanding Professional for Landscape Architecture

Ildefonso Paez Santos Jr. (September 5, 1929 – January 29, 2014), popularly known simply as "IP Santos", was a Filipino architect who was known for being the "Father of Philippine Landscape Architecture." He was recognized as a National Artist of the Philippines in the field of Architecture in 2006.

He was the son of Filipino poet Ildefonso Santos and Asuncion Paez.

== Education ==
Santos graduated from the University of Santo Tomas in 1954 with a degree in the field of architecture. He then pursued a second degree in Architecture, as well as a Master of Architecture degree at the University of Southern California School of Architecture.

== Work ==
Santos pioneered the profession of landscape architecture in the Philippines. He was bestowed with the title of "national artist" for his outstanding achievement in architecture and allied arts on June 9, 2006.

Among the locations that comprise IP Santos' body of work are the landscaping of:

- Cultural Center of the Philippines Complex
- Makati Commercial Center (now Ayala Center)
- Bantayog ng mga Bayani
- Manila Hotel
- San Miguel Corporation Building
- Philippine Plaza (now Sofitel Philippine Plaza Manila)
- Old Nayong Pilipino
- Paco Park
- Rizal Park
- Loyola Memorial Park – Marikina
- Tagaytay Highlands Golf and Country Club
- The Orchard Golf and Country Club
- Magallanes Church
- Asian Institute of Management
- Burnham Park
- Taikoo Shing, Hong Kong

== Death ==
Santos died of heart failure on January 29, 2014.
