= Huseng Batute =

Filipino writer

José Corazón de Jesús
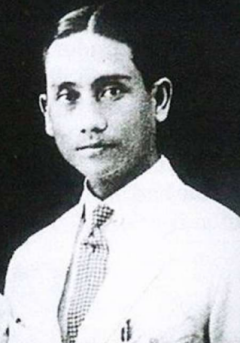
- José Corazón de Jesús in 1924
- Born: José Cecilio de Jesús; November 22, 1896; Santa Cruz, Manila, Captaincy General of the Philippines
- Died: May 26, 1932 (aged 35); Santa Maria, Bulacan, Philippine Islands
- Resting place: Manila North Cemetery
- Education: Liceo de Manila
- Occupations: Poet, lyricist
- Spouse: Asunción Lacdan
- Children: Teresa de Jesús; José Corazón de Jesús, Jr. Rogelio de Jesús
- Writing career
- Pen name: Huseng Batute
- Language: Tagalog
- Notable work: Buhay Maynila

José Cecilio Corazón de Jesús y Pangilinan (November 22, 1894 – May 26, 1932), also known by his pen name Huseng Batute, was a Filipino poet who used Tagalog poetry to express the Filipinos' desire for independence during the American occupation of the Philippines, a period that lasted from 1901 to 1946. He is best known for being the "Hari ng Balagtasan" (transl. King of Balagtasan), and for being the lyricist of the Filipino patriotic song "Bayan Ko".

== Early life ==
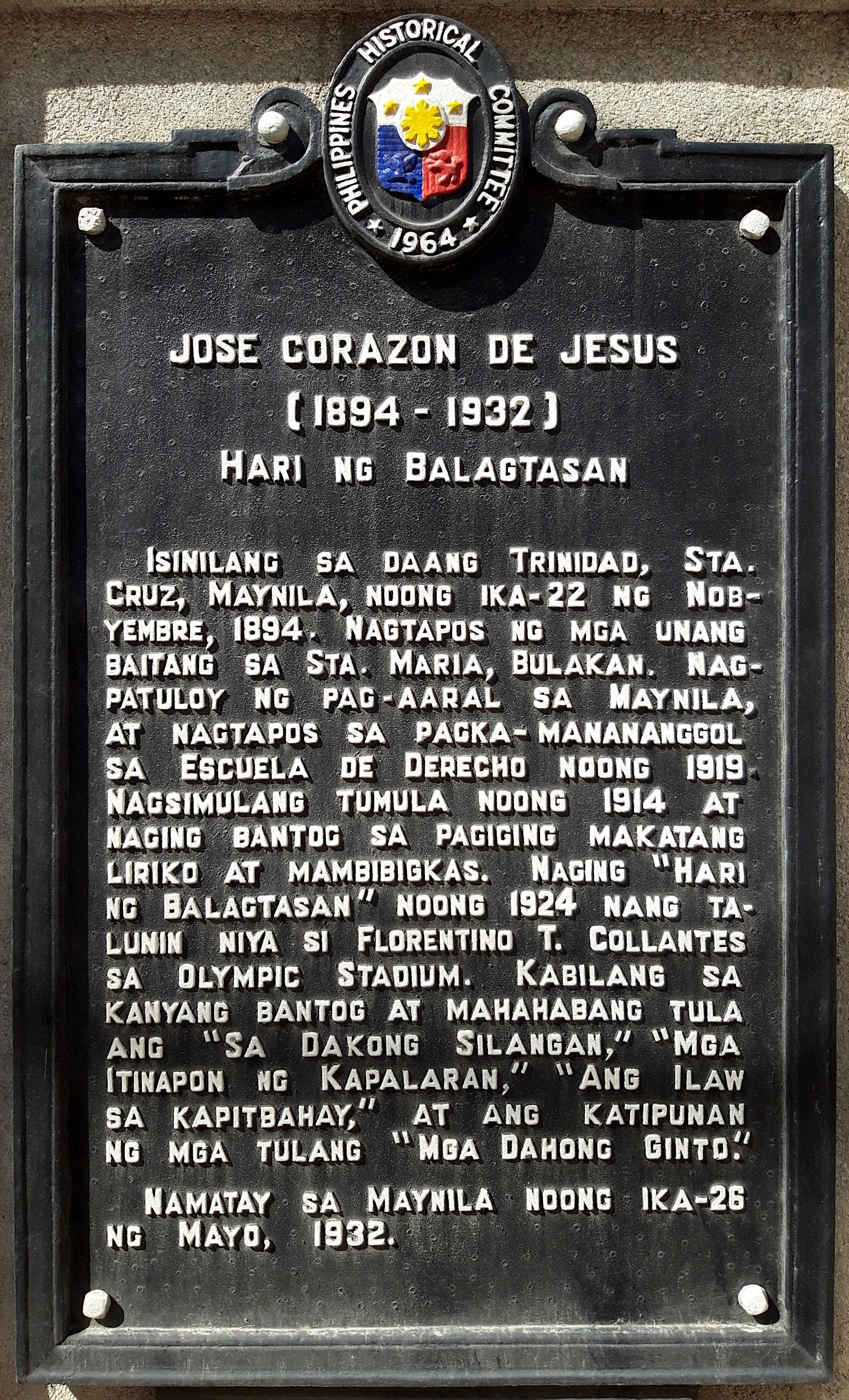
Historical marker installed in de Jesús's father's hometown of Santa Maria, Bulacan

De Jesús was born on November 22, 1896 in Santa Cruz, Manila, to Vicente de Jesús, the first health bureau director of the American occupation government, and Susana Pangilinan of Pampanga. He was christened José Cecilio de Jesús but he later dropped Cecilio and replaced it with the Spanish name Corazón (heart) because he said it best described his character.

De Jesús spent his childhood in Santa Maria, his father's hometown. He completed his education at the Liceo de Manila, where he graduated in 1916.

== King of the Balagtasan ==
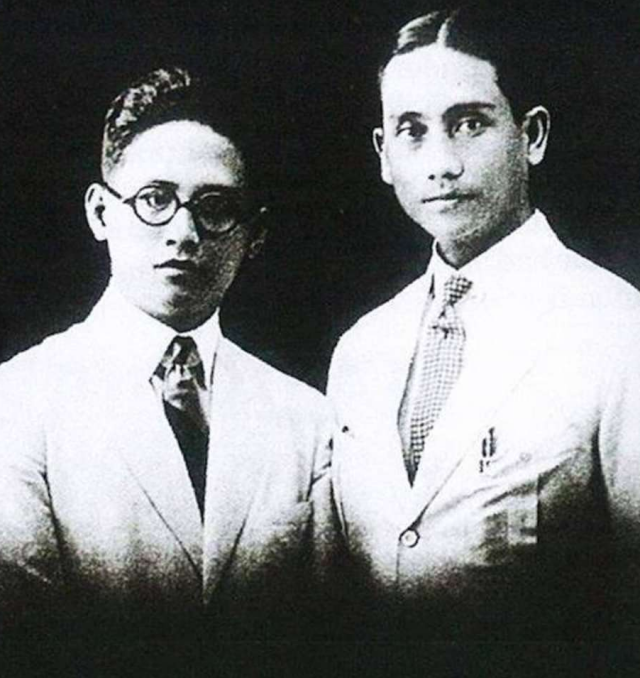
Florentino Collantes (left) and Jose Corazon de Jesus (right) on the first balagtasan in Manila

On March 28, 1924, de Jesús and other leading Tagalog writers met at a women's school in Tondo, Manila, under the auspices of Filipino educator Rosa Sevilla, to discuss how to celebrate the birth anniversary of Tagalog poet Francisco Balagtas on April 2. They decided to hold a duplo, or a dramatic debate in verse that was in its waning days in the 1920s. They changed the format of the duplo and renamed it balagtasan in honor of Balagtas.

There were three pairs of poets who participated in the first balagtasan on April 6, 1924 at the defunct Instituto de Mujeres (Women's Institute), founded by Sevilla, but the audience were most impressed by de Jesús and another Filipino poet, Florentino Collantes.

The balagtasan was an instant hit, later became a common feature in Manila's biggest and most expensive theaters until the 1950s. De Jesús and Collantes were pitted against each other in a contrived rivalry and a showdown was set for October 18, 1925 at the Olympic Stadium. De Jesús was acclaimed winner of the showdown and was dubbed "Hari ng Balagtasan" (king of versified debate). He held the title until his death in 1932.

== Death ==
De Jesús contracted an ulcer during the filming of Oriental Blood and died of ulcer complications on May 26, 1932. He was survived by his wife Asunción Lacdan de Jesús and children Teresa, José Jr., and Rogelio.

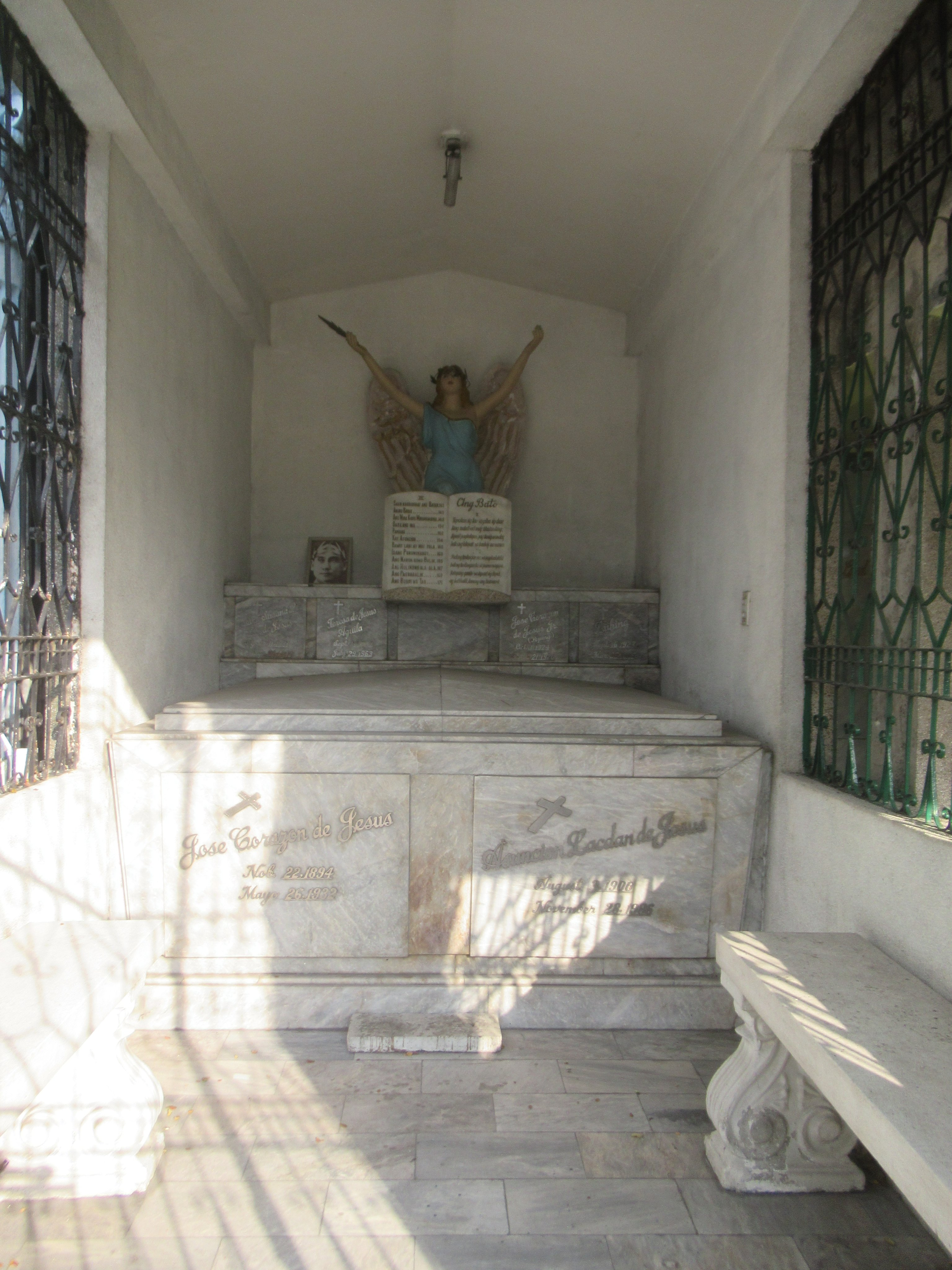
Huseng Batute & Asunción Lacdan's family grave at Manila North Cemetery.

Upon his death, his heart was donated to a government museum where it was preserved until it was buried with his mother. He was finally interred at the Manila North Cemetery where he was buried under a tree, as he wished in his poems Isang Punong Kahoy (One Tree) and Ang Akasya (The Acacia). Many of his descendants now live in Canada, the United States as well as the Philippines, carrying on the family name of Aguila, as only his daughter Teresa, married and had children.

== Selected works ==
José Corazón de Jesús's works appeared on several magazines and newspapers, notably Ang Democracia, Taliba, Liwayway, ang buhay sa nddu and Sampagita. In addition, his works have appeared in various anthologies and textbooks from grade school to college. Among his more popular works are:

- Ang Manok Kong Bulik ("My White Rooster", 1911) - a poem about a country man's misfortune in cockfighting
- Barong Tagalog (1921) - poem written after the Filipino national costume
- Ang Pagbabalik ("Homecoming", 1924)
- Ang Pamana ("The Legacy", 1925)
- Isang Punongkahoy ("A Tree", 1932)

Some of his poems were set into music; among these are:

- Bayan Ko ("My Country", 1929) - music by Constancio de Guzman
- Pakiusap ("A Request") - music by Francisco Santiago

== See also ==
- Literature of the Philippines
- History of the Philippines
- José Corazón de Jesús, Jr.
