= Florentino Collantes =

Filipino poet (1896-1951)

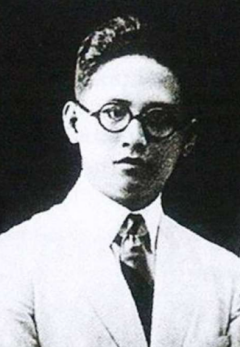
- Florentino Collantes in 1924
- Born: Florentino Collantes y Tancioco; October 16, 1896
- Died: July 15, 1951 (aged 54)
- Writing career
- Language: Tagalog
- Notable works: Ang Lumang Simbahan (1929), Ang Magsasaka, Pangarap sa Bagong Kasal, Mahalin Ang Atin, Ang Tulisan (1936)

Florentino Collantes y Tancioco (October 16, 1896 – July 15, 1951) was a Filipino poet who was among the writers who spearheaded a revival of interest in Tagalog literature in the Philippines in the 20th century.

== Early years ==
Collantes was born in the village of Dampol in Pulilan, Bulacan to Toribio Collantes of Baliwag, Bulacan and Manuela Tancioco of Pulilan. He completed his primary and secondary schooling in Malolos, Bulacan.

As a teenager, Collantes displayed an avid interest in literature and memorized epic poems in Spanish (corridos) and Tagalog (awits). He is known to have committed to memory long excerpts from versified stories on the passion of Jesus Christ, known as 'pasion', that are traditionally sung in public during Holy Week in the Philippines. He was also a skilled practitioner of 'duplo', or a dramatic poetical joust that was a popular form of entertainment in the Philippines until the 1950s. At the age of 15, he already read almost all (awits), ('dula') and corrido. Due to poverty, he only manages to read books and journals by helping to sell some awits and corridos during fiestas and he uses the money he earns to borrow some journals from a nearby store.

== Maturity ==
As an adult, Collantes worked in the government's Bureau of Lands, and that is where he was given a number of provincial assignments that gave him the opportunity to learn the Kapampangan, Ilocano and Visayan languages.

His interest in poetry led him to write for the defunct Tagalog publications Buntot Pagi, Pagkakaisa and Watawat. He would later be an editor of the defunct publications Pakak, Balagtas, Lintik and Ang Bansa.

In 1925, he was asked to join a group of Tagalog writers to organize an event to mark the birth anniversary of the Tagalog poet Francisco Balagtas on April 2. The group included the writers Rosa Sevilla and Jose Corazon de Jesus.

The group decided to change the format of the traditional duplo and rename it balagtasan, in honor of Balagtas. The first balagtasan was held in Tayuman, Manila on April 6, 1925. Several pairs of poets joined the literary joust but Collantes and De Jesus were the most popular. The organizers pitted the two in a rivalry that culminated in a contest for the title of 'Hari ng Balagtasan' (King of the Balagtasan).

== Poet of the people ==
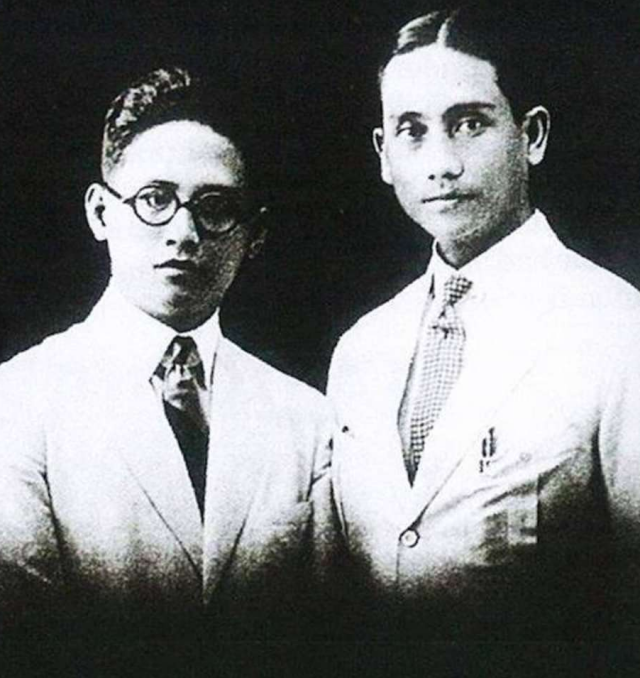
Florentino Collantes (left) and Jose Corazon de Jesus (right) on the first balagtasan in Manila

Although De Jesus was acclaimed 'Hari ng Balagtasan', Collantes also gained national fame as a poet. His most memorable work is 'Ang Lumang Simbahan', which was so popular that he expanded it into a novel that was later turned into a movie starring Mary Walter. The movie is now acclaimed as a classic in Philippine cinema.

His other works that are now taught in schools all over the Philippines are 'Ang Magsasaka' (The Farmer), 'Pangarap sa Bagong Kasal' (Dream For The Newly-Weds), 'Mahalin Ang Atin' (Love Our Own), 'Ang Tulisan' (The Bandit) and 'Ang Labindalawang Kuba' (The Twelve Hunchbacks).

On July 4, 1950, Collantes was conferred the title 'Makata ng Bayan' (Poet of the People) by President Elpidio Quirino.

Collantes died on July 15, 1951, at the age of 55. He was survived by his wife Sixta Tancioco and eight children.

== Works ==
- Ang Lumang Simbahan
- Ang Tulisan
- Ang Barasoain
- Alitaptap
- Nagumon sa Bisyo
- Pag-ibig at Awa

== See also ==
- Literature of the Philippines
- History of the Philippines
