= Ildefonso Santos =

Filipino poet (1897–1984)

Ildefonso Santiago Santos
- Born: January 23, 1897; Tambobong, Manila, Captaincy General of the Philippines
- Died: January 28, 1984 (aged 87); Malabon, Philippines
- Education: National Teachers College

Ildefonso Santiago Santos (January 23, 1897 – January 28, 1984) was a Filipino educator, poet, and linguist. Recognized as one of the finest poets in Tagalog, Santos was also renowned with his translations of Rubaiyat of Omar Khayam and of the Philippine National Anthem, and for his use of the ancient Filipino form of poetry known as Tanaga.

He was the father of Ildefonso P. Santos, Jr., the architect who was awarded as national artist for his outstanding achievement in architecture and allied arts.

== Early life ==
Ildefonso Santos was born on January 23, 1897, at Baritan, Tambobong (the present-day Malabon) to Andres Santos and Atanacia Santiago, the last of five siblings. A son of a tailor, Santos came from a poor family but with high interest in literature. As a student at Malabon Elementary School, he would go home and read out loud various awit and corido such as Don Juan Teñoso, Don Alejandro at Don Luis, and Ibong Adarna, to his old aunt who could not read nor write. This sparked his interest in poetry.

During his fifth grade, Santos and his friend published a simple periodical of poetry which they sold for one centavo.

His close relationship with his cousin, the poet Leonardo A. Dianzon inspired him to pursue his interest in poetry. Dianzon was the first one who recognized Santos' skill in writing Tagalog poems and helped him to get his poem published in ‘Ang Mithi’ under the pen name ‘Ilaw-Silangan’, even while still in elementary school. This caught the attention of the editor, Iñigo Ed. Regalado who then encouraged him to pursue his poetry skills.

== Teaching career ==
After his graduation from elementary school, Santos was not able to continue his secondary education for two years. His uncle promised to send him to Manila High School (now Araullo High School) but was not accepted due to a then-recent regulation that non-Manila residents may not enroll in the said school. Santos enrolled at Philippine Normal School and signed a contract that after his graduation, he would teach in the same school for a year.

The school recognized his excellence in teaching and appointed him to represent Rizal province to the Teacher’s Vacation Assembly in Manila where he underwent training as a demonstration teacher. Soon, he qualified as a Senior Teacher and was appointed as principal of Marikina Elementary School.

He was then appointed as district superintendent but could not assume the position due to his lack of a college degree. He then enrolled at the National Teachers College (NTC) and earned a bachelor’s degree in Education.

Even during this time, Santos still wrote poems, such as ‘Gabi’, ‘Ang Ulap’, ‘Ang Guryon’, ‘Taga-Ilog’, and ‘Sa Tabi ng Dagat’ which were published in ‘Ang Mithi’ and later in Liwayway.

== Linguist ==
Before the Second World War, Jaime C. de Veyra of Institute of National Language commissioned Santos to submit a translation of the Philippine National Hymn written by Jose Palma, which was then still sung in English as ‘Land of the Morning’.

In 1940, Tagalog was approved as the basis of for the National Language of the Philippines. Santos then became the first Tagalog Teacher at NTC. He also taught Tagalog at Baguio Vocation Normal School. He was appointed supervisor of National Language of the Department of Education (Philippines) until 1942, when World War II broke out in the Philippines. During the Japanese Occupation, Santos was offered membership to the Institute of National language which was headed by Lope K. Santos (the two are unrelated). Not wishing to serve the Japanese invaders, Santos rejected the offer. There were attempts by the Japanese police to arrest Santos, but he was always successful to elude them.

His linguistic skills helped him in his works of translation. In 1948, the Tagalog version of the Himno Nacional Filipina translated by him, Julian Cruz Balmaceda and Francisco Caballo was adopted as the official version of the Philippine National Anthem until 1956.

In 1953, he published his translation of Rubaiyat of Omar Khayam.

== Awards ==
On July 2, 1954, President Ramon Magsaysay gave him the Award of Merit to Santos for his ‘contribution towards the advancement of Filipino culture in the field of National Language Literature’. In 1956, the Province of Rizal under Governor Isidro Rodgriguez awarded Santos another award of merit, mainly for his translation of Rubaiyat. The Panitik ng Kababaihan awarded him the medal of distinction in literature, for being one of the main poets of race. In 1963, the Institute of National Language recognized his achievements.

== Personal life ==
He was married to Asuncion Paez from Malabon, who bore him eight children, one of which is Ildefonso P. Santos, Jr., the National Artist for Architecture and Visual Arts in 2006. His family lived in a house at Hulong Duhat, Malabon. A strong disciplinarian, Santos instilled in his children the love of education.

He was a numismatic and a fan of gardening.

== Death ==
A heavy smoker, Santos was later diagnosed with lung cancer. He died in his home on January 28, 1984, and was buried at San Bartolome Catholic Cemetery, San Agustin, Malabon.

== His works ==
- Tatlong Inakay (The Three Chicks or Three Young Fowls)
- Gabi (Night)
- Ang Guryon (The Kite)
- Sa Tabi ng Dagat (At The Seaside)
- Ulap (Cloud)
- Mangingisda (Fisherman)
- Pilipinas Kong Mahal (My Beloved Philippines)
