= José Corazón de Jesús Jr. =

Filipino actor

- Born: 1 October 1924; Manila, Philippines
- Died: 21 April 1970 (aged 46)
- Occupation: Actor

José Corazón Lacdan de Jesús Jr. (1 October 1924 – 21 April 1970) was a Filipino silent film actor.

Corazón de Jesús Jr. was born on 21 October 1924 in Manila, the Philippines. He was the son of Tagalog poet José Corazón de Jesús (1894–1932) and Asuncion Lacdan (1900–1986). He had two other siblings; Teresa (1922–1963) and Rogelio (b. 1927).

He was also known as the Tagalog language tutor for Sampaguita Pictures, notably teaching actress Gloria Romero on how to deliver lines. Despite this, he never starred in any films for the studio, instead only appearing in LVN Pictures productions.

Jose Corazón de Jesús Jr. died on 21 April 1970 at the age of 46.

== Filmography ==
Year	Title
1930	Oriental Blood
1932	Sa Pinto ng Langit
1946	Garrison 13
1950	Candaba
1950	Doctor X
1950	Sohrab at Rustum
1950	Apat na Alas
1951	Pulo ng Engkantada
1951	Prinsipe Amante sa Rubitanya
1951	Haring Cobra
1953	3 Labuyo
1953	Kidlat, Ngayon
1954	Doce Pares
1954	Ikaw ang Dahilan
1955	Banal O Makasalanan
1955	Higit sa Lahat
1955	Pilipino Kostum No Touch
1956	Higit sa Korona
1957	Lelong Mong Panot
1958	Eddie Junior Detective
