= Radio Veritas =

Philippine Catholic shortwave radio station

Radio Veritas Asia (RVA)
- Type: Private
- Industry: Broadcast radio station
- Founded: April 11, 1969
- Headquarters: Quezon City and Lahore
- Area served: Worldwide
- Key people: Rev. Fr. Felmar Castrodes Fiel, SVD (General Manager); Gerry Gasacao (Administrative/Finance Director); Rev. Fr. Mi Shen (Program Director)
- Owner: Philippine Radio Educational and Information Center
- Website: rvasia.org

Radio Veritas Asia is a non-commercial Catholic shortwave radio station that broadcasts across Asia. Headquartered in Quezon City, Philippines, it is operated by the Philippine Radio Educational and Information Center (PREIC), which also managed the original Radio Veritas from 1969 to 1991.

The station's Urdu Service commenced operations on August 14, 1987, in Lahore, Pakistan, targeting Urdu-speaking audiences. Radio Veritas Asia focuses on promoting social justice for marginalized communities through programming centered on moral, religious, and inspirational themes. Additionally, it aims to foster peace and unity across diverse sects, ethnicities, and genders by producing sociocultural content and facilitating interfaith dialogue.

Aligned with its mission, the station emphasizes ethical values, advocates for harmony, and serves as a platform for intercultural and interreligious understanding in Asia.

== History ==
Radio Veritas Asia traces its origins to December 1958, when delegates of the Southeast Asian Bishops' Conference unanimously resolved to establish a radio station serving Southeast Asia. Eleven years later, on April 11, 1969, Radio Veritas was inaugurated.

The Federation of Asian Bishops' Conference (FABC) assumed operational oversight of Radio Veritas Asia (RVA) starting in 1970. This responsibility was formally confirmed by the FABC General Assembly in 1974.

In the early hours of November 7, 1985, Radio Veritas journalist Jun Taña survived a stabbing attack by two assailants while he was walking home.

Since 1991, the annual magazine of RVA's Urdu Service has been housed in the office building of WAVE Studio in Lahore, Pakistan. A majority of the Urdu Service's programs are also recorded at this studio.

=== Role in the People Power Revolution ===
During the 1986 People Power Revolution, Camp Crame emerged as a key rallying site for protesters.

In February 1986, allegations of election fraud during the 1986 Philippine presidential election sparked nationwide unrest. Mass protests ensued, including the Tagumpay ng Bayan rally at Rizal Park on February 16, and a boycott of businesses linked to Ferdinand Marcos' regime. Amid the turmoil, the Reform the Armed Forces Movement (RAM), led by Defense Secretary Juan Ponce Enrile, attempted a coup by seizing Camp Aguinaldo.

After learning Marcos' forces had uncovered the plot, Enrile invited Philippine Constabulary Chief Fidel Ramos to join the rebellion. Ramos agreed, and the two held a press conference at Camp Aguinaldo to announce their withdrawal of support for Marcos. Following the event, Ramos returned to Camp Crame, while Enrile remained at Camp Aguinaldo.

Through Radio Veritas, anti-Marcos activist Butz Aquino and Cardinal Jaime Sin broadcast urgent appeals to the public after Enrile and Ramos publicized their defection. With the permission of journalist Jun Taña, Aquino spoke via telephone from Camp Aguinaldo once Ramos and Enrile's second press conference had ended, calling for a march from an Isetann department store in Quezon City to the camp. Some minutes after, Sin went on the air to urge Filipinos to form a human barricade along EDSA between the two camps to shield the defectors from Marcos' military.

Radio Veritas experienced two attacks against its transmitter by the military: in the early morning of February 23 and the evening of February 24. Although the transmitter was already destroyed in the initial attack, soldiers returned the day after due to subsequent broadcasts from Radyo Bandido by June Keithley and other journalists reporting on the revolution.

=== Post-revolution developments ===
After the revolution, Radio Veritas' station was rehabilitated with the aid of proceeds from the charity album Handog ng Pilipino sa Mundo, with its titular song commissioned by WEA Records chief executive Ramon Chuaying.

The station later expanded its outreach by adopting new technologies, including internet streaming and webcasting, while planning a transition to digital broadcasting. From 2007 to June 2011, the station received over 30,000 listener letters from Pakistan, 3,500 from India, and 500 from other countries.

On October 9, 2011, RVA's Urdu Service hosted its 11th Listeners' Conference in Lahore, attended by over 80 participants nationwide. The service aired 13 daily programs in Urdu, reaching audiences in Pakistan and India, under the leadership of studio director Father Nadeem John Shakir.

The 15th Catholic Radio Listeners' Conference was held on September 21, 2015, at Lahore's Loyola Hall, drawing 120 attendees. Bishop Joseph Arshad of Faisalabad, head of the Commission for Social Communications, emphasized the role of radio in fostering peace, tolerance, and brotherhood.

RVA's shortwave transmissions officially ceased on June 30, 2018.

== Funding ==
Radio Veritas Asia’s operations are primarily funded by Missio, a German Catholic pontifical mission society. In 2010, Missio announced a 10% reduction in its annual financial support to the organization.

Additionally, the Catholic Bishops' Conference of Pakistan provided annual funding of PKR 10,000 (approximately $170 USD as of 2005) to support RVA's Urdu Service until 2005.

== Programs ==
Radio Veritas Asia (RVA) designs its programming around its dual objectives of evangelization and sociocultural empowerment.

=== Evangelization ===
RVA's evangelization efforts feature a mix of moral, religious, and sociocultural content, alongside limited political, economic, and informational programs. Core offerings include:

- Gospel Reflection
- Church News
- Morals
- Catholic Doctrines
- Catechesis
- Liturgy and Sacraments
- Dialogue with Religions and Cultures
- Role of the Church in the Modern World

In 2015, the station introduced two daily 27-minute programs (morning and evening) covering health, cultural values, global landmarks, notable personalities, social issues, literature, inventions, and international news.

=== Thematic focus ===
RVA's sociocultural programming emphasizes:

- People Empowerment
- Community Building
- Family
- Women and Youth
- Science and Technology
- Environment
- History and Culture
- News and Information
- Health

== Through the years ==
=== Papal endorsements ===
During Radio Veritas Asia's (RVA) 25th anniversary in 1995, Pope John Paul II emphasized the importance of supporting the station’s mission, acknowledging that doing so would require "greater sacrifices and renewed commitment" from local churches across Asia.

On April 11, 2019, Pope Francis sent a message to RVA for its 50th anniversary, urging the station to continue fostering "a more just and united society."

=== Archives and UNESCO recognition ===
RVA's archives house original broadcast recordings from the 1986 People Power Revolution. In recognition of their historical significance, UNESCO cataloged these audio files under its Memory of the World Programme and Digital Preservation of Documentary Heritage initiatives.

=== News service expansion ===
On July 25, 2020, Archbishop Joseph Arshad of Islamabad-Rawalpindi, then-chair of Pakistan's National Commission for Social Communications, launched RVA's Urdu-language news service. This marked the first dedicated Catholic news program in Pakistan.

== See also ==
- Catholic Media Network
- DZRV

== Website ==
- Radio Veritas Asia's website
