= JoAnne Lorenzana =

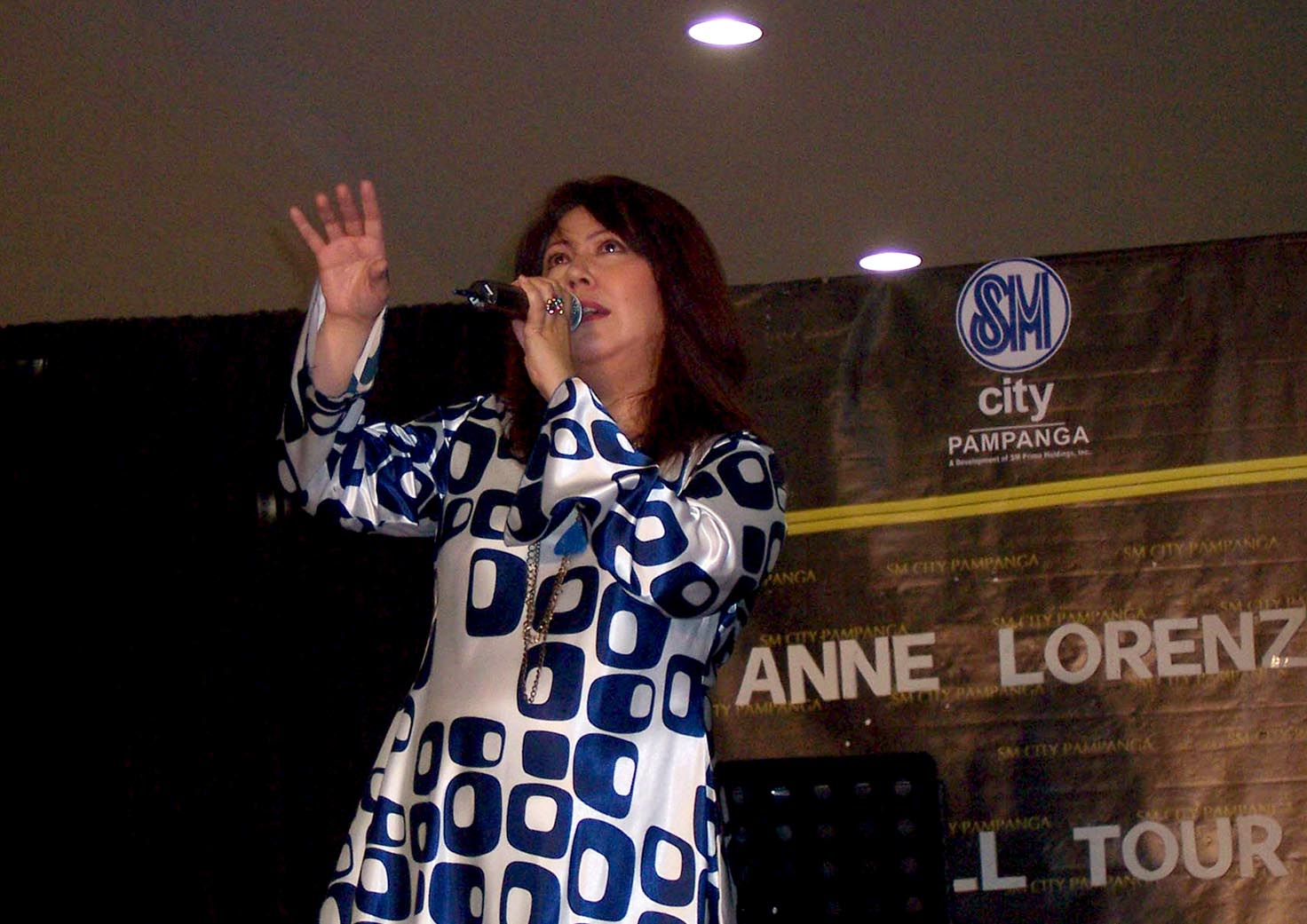
- JoAnne Lorenzana

Background information
- Born: Joanne Geraldine O. Lorenzana; 14 February 1966 (age 60)
- Origin: Quezon City, Philippines
- Genres: OPM; pop; jazz; easy listening
- Occupations: Singer; lyricist; writer; emcee
- Instrument: Vocals
- Years active: 1985–2000, 2009–present
- Labels: Vicor Music, OctoArts, NeoMONDE Productions, Universal

Joanne Geraldine O. Lorenzana, known professionally as JoAnne Lorenzana, is a Filipino recording and performing artist, songwriter and former model, best known as an exponent of Original Pilipino Music in the mid-1980s to the 1990s.

== Personal life ==
Joanne's grandmother was the late pre war singer actress Naty Bernardo.

== Biography ==
Lorenzana is a graduate of the University of the Philippines Diliman.

She was discovered by Filipino composer-singer-manager Nonong 'Dero' Pedero in 1984, who soon took the young singer under his management, employing her talent for commercial jingles. Prior to Lorenzana's formal foray into local Philippine entertainment, she front-acted for international acts held locally, such as Gloria Estefan and the Miami Sound Machine, Menudo (the former group of Ricky Martin) and the British jazz ensemble Shakatak. The following year, she was launched in a show billed as JoAnne: Her First Time to announce the entry of the pop artist into the music industry.

Lorenzana represented the Philippines at the 5th Asean Song Festival held in Singapore in 1988 and the 1st ASIA Song Festival, held in Nagoya, Japan in 1989. She sang the nationalistic song "Bayan Ko" which she revived in 1987 for PLDT and won for her the 'Best Revival Recording' for the Awit Awards (the Philippines' version of the Grammys).

Lorenzana's albums include "JoAnne Lorenzana" a self-titled album that launched the singer's recording career in 1987 with a first number 1 hit single as "I'll Never Let you Go". Said album churned additional hit singles. The singer's albums and singles are listed in the discography section. Between Seasons (2009), which was recorded and mixed in the U.S., released under her own label NeoMONDE Productions and distributed in the Philippines under Universal Records Philippines Inc. Her song "My Everyday Valentine" was co-written with Jimmy Borja, who did the music; Lorenzana started writing the lyrics in 2016. The song was arranged in 2020 by Jimmy Antiporda.

Lorenzana's last solo concert project was a virtual show "JoAnne Lorenzana@35: Love Songs & Lessons" aired in August of 2021 in celebration of the artist's 35 years in the Philippine Music Industry. A repeat of the show was held in December of the same year.

== Discography ==
Year	Album title and singles	Recording company
1988	Jo Anne Lorenzana (self-titled debut album): "I'll Never Let You Go" ("Most Requested Song" Award in 1987; eight weeks in the No. 1 slot nationwide); "YOU" (second No. 1 radio hit); "Kung Alam Mo Lang" (a theme song for the movie "Paano Tatakasan Ang Bukas" under VIVA Films; also a frequently revived hit with seven cover versions to date); "Back in Your Arms" ("Most Requested Song" Award in 1989); "Bayan Ko" (revival) – special tri-media release (non-single)	Vicor Music Corporation
1989	Stronger Than Before: "Daydreaming"; "Hoy! Pakibilsan"; "Without Your Love"	OctoArts International Philippines
1991	Kailan Pa Man: "Pigil na Pigil"; "Nais Ko"; "Sapat Sa Akin Lahat"	OctoArts/EMI Philippines now PolyEast Records
1994	Joanne Lorenzana (Hits Collection): "Goodtimes, Badtimes" (first single with a music video aired on MTV Asia (now known as MTV Southeast Asia )	OctoArts/EMI Philippines, now PolyEast Records
2009	Between Seasons (U.S. release): "Beautiful"; "Technicolor"; "You're Hiding"; "Look of Love"	NeoMONDE Productions
2010	Between Seasons (Philippines): "Beautiful"; "Technicolor"; "Kung Kasama Ka"	Universal Records Philippines (Phils.) - Distribution only
2015	New Year's Day (U.S. release) Digital Release	NeoMONDE Productions
2021	My Everyday Valentine (U.S. release) Digital Release	NeoMONDE Productions
