= Balagtasan =

Form of academic debate

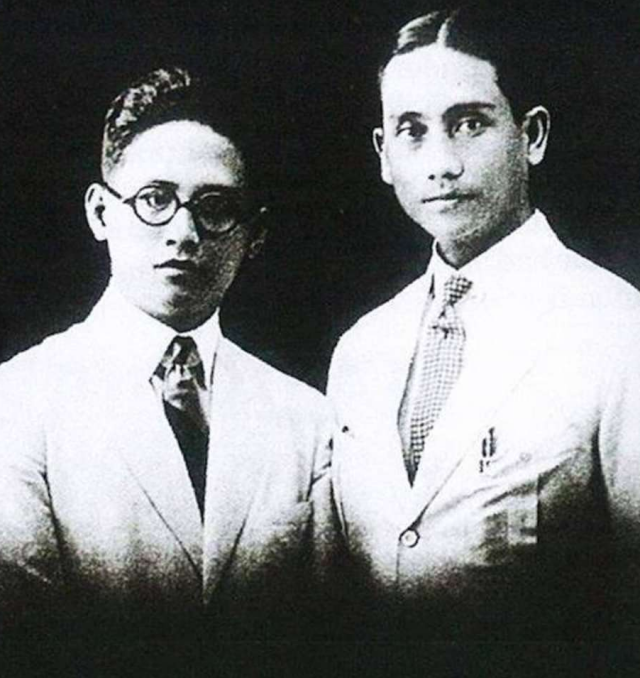
Florentino Collantes (left) and Jose Corazon de Jesus (right) are the first performers of balagtasan in manila

The Balagtasan is a traditional Filipino form of debate conducted in verse. Derived from the surname of prominent Filipino poet Francisco Balagtas, the art form presents a type of literature and performance where arguments, reasoning, and opinions are expressed through poetic speech. It is a verbal joust that highlights the participants' wit, humor, and mastery of the Filipino language and rhyming structures.

== History ==
The concept of the balagtasan was formalized on March 28, 1924, during a meeting of the Kapulungang Balagtas (Balagtas Council) at the office of Rosa Sevilla in the Instituto de Mujeres in Tondo, Manila. The gathering was held to prepare for the birth anniversary of Francisco Balagtas. During the meeting, Filipino writer Lope K. Santos suggested holding a modern duplo (a traditional poetic game) to honor the poet. However, the group deemed the duplo inappropriate for the celebration's format and instead created a new poetic form, naming it "balagtasan."

The first official balagtasan took place on April 6, 1924, at the Instituto de Mujeres. The event featured a scripted debate with three pairs of poets. The most celebrated match was between Jose Corazon de Jesus (defending the role of the Butterfly or Paruparo) and Florentino T. Collantes (defending the role of the Bee or Bubuyog), with Lope K. Santos acting as the moderator. Due to the massive popularity of their performance, an unscripted rematch was held on October 18, 1925, at the Olympic Stadium in Manila, where Jose Corazon de Jesus (also known by his pen name Huseng Batute) emerged victorious and was crowned the first "Hari ng Balagtasan" (King of Balagtasan).

== Format and roles ==
A standard balagtasan is typically participated in by three individuals taking on specific roles:

- Lakandiwa (or Lakambini if female): The mediator, judge, and host of the event. The lakandiwa introduces the topic, moderates the exchange to ensure it remains orderly, and ultimately decides the winner of the debate based on the merit of their reasoning and their poetic delivery.
- Mambabalagtas: The two opposing debaters. One argues in favor of the topic (affirmative), while the other argues against it (negative). They must deliver their arguments and refutations strictly in verse and rhyme, and are often expected to perform extemporaneously or display a high degree of memorization.

The participants are judged not only on the logic of their arguments but also on their theatricality, wit, and ability to entertain the audience while adhering to metric and rhyming constraints.

== Cultural impact and modern adaptations ==
Following its inception, the balagtasan became a highly popular form of public entertainment in the Philippines until the outbreak of World War II. Its success inspired regional adaptations across the Philippine archipelago. Ilocano writers created the Bukanegan, named after Pedro Bukaneg (the father of Ilocano literature), while Kapampangan poets established the Crisotan, named after Juan Crisostomo Soto.

In contemporary times, the essence of the balagtasan continues to influence modern Philippine pop culture. The rise of battle rap leagues in the Philippines, most notably FlipTop Battle League, is frequently compared by academics and cultural observers to the traditional balagtasan. Both forms share elements of verbal jousting, poetic rhythm, and crowd engagement, though modern battle rap leans heavily towards freestyle insults rather than the formal, socio-political debate of the traditional format.

To preserve and modernize the tradition, cultural institutions like the Cultural Center of the Philippines (CCP) have introduced hybrid competitions. In 2024, the CCP launched BaRaptasan, a national competition that fuses traditional balagtasan mechanics with modern rap. This event brought together storytellers, poets, and theater actors from across the country to celebrate the evolution of Filipino spoken word and verbal jousting.
