= Handog ng Pilipino sa Mundo =

1986 song

Single by Various artists
- Language: Tagalog
- A-side: "Handog ng Pilipino sa Mundo"
- B-side: "Ang Bayan Kong Pilipinas"
- Released: March 1986
- Genre: Patriotic music
- Length: 4:27
- Label: WEA (Philippines); Riva (UK)
- Songwriter: Apo Hiking Society

Music video
- "Handog Ng Pilipino Sa Mundo" on YouTube

"Handog ng Pilipino sa Mundo" (lit. '"The Gift of the Filipinos to the World"'), released in English as "A New and Better Way—The People's Anthem," is a 1986 song recorded in Filipino by a supergroup composed of 15 Filipino artists. The song commemorates the bloodless People Power Revolution which ended President Ferdinand Marcos's 20-year rule, and was benefit single for the rehabilitation of Radio Veritas, the Catholic Church-owned public affairs radio station which was instrumental in the revolution. The lyrics of the song are inscribed on a wall of Our Lady of EDSA Shrine, a national shrine since erected where many of the protestors converged.

== Background and production ==
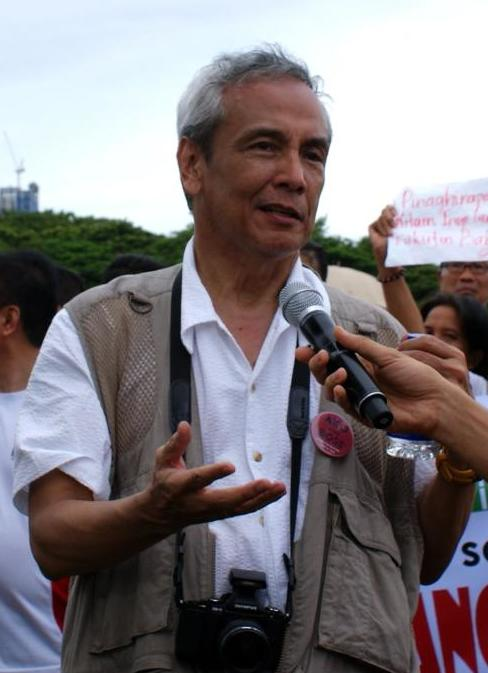
Jim Paredes composed the song in 1986

Ramon Chuaying, head of WEA Records (now Universal Records), commissioned singer-songwriter Jim Paredes of Apo Hiking Society to write a song inspired by the People Power Revolution for the company's upcoming compilation album of patriotic songs. Paredes wrote the song in three minutes with no revisions, and the song eventually became its carrier single. The song was performed by artists who were actively involved in the People Power Revolution, with all performers waiving their talent fees and record outlets waiving their sales commissions from the record.

An English version of this song was also recorded entitled "A New and Better Way - The People's Anthem", and released in Australia and the United Kingdom. Both the original and English version were released as singles, with the proceeds going to the rehabilitation of DZRV, as its main transmitter in Malolos, Bulacan to the north was destroyed by Marcos loyalist troops while the station gave live coverage of the EDSA Revolution.

The English version of the hit single includes a letter from Cardinal Jaime Sin, Archbishop of Manila, whose plea for civilian aid to rebel troops was broadcast via Radio Veritas.

=== Music video ===
A music video was also produced for the song by director Mike de Leon. Leaders featured included senators Jose W. Diokno, Rene Saguisag, Butz Aquino, Lorenzo Tañada, and the newly installed President Corazon Aquino and Vice-President Doy Laurel. Kris Aquino, then a teenager, appeared in the music video with the artists performing in-studio. National heroes from the Spanish period and prominent scenes from the revolution were also featured. Censors pulled the music video shortly after broadcast, citing a clip of protesters at Malacañang Palace slapping pictures of Ferdinand and Imelda Marcos, as "too strong" for the public. The original music video was aired decades later on Filipino television music channel Myx, uploaded on YouTube by Paredes; de Leon uploaded a shorter edit on Vimeo, cutting footage of the singers and focusing more on the scenes from the revolution.

=== Featured artists ===
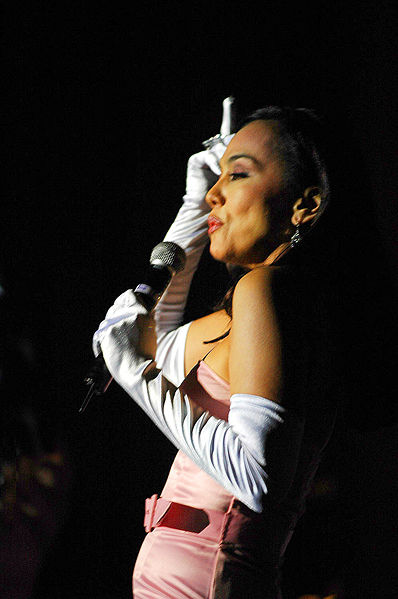
Kuh Ledesma is among the original supergroup which recorded the song.

- Apo Hiking Society
- Celeste Legaspi
- Coritha & Eric
- Edru Abraham
- Gretchen Barretto
- Ivy Violan
- Inang Laya
- Joseph Olfindo
- Kuh Ledesma
- Leah Navarro
- Lester Demetillo
- Noel Trinidad
- Subas Herrero

== 2011 remake ==
As part of silver jubilee celebrations for the EDSA Revolution, television network ABS-CBN produced a cover, with an updated arrangement and music videos.

=== Artists ===
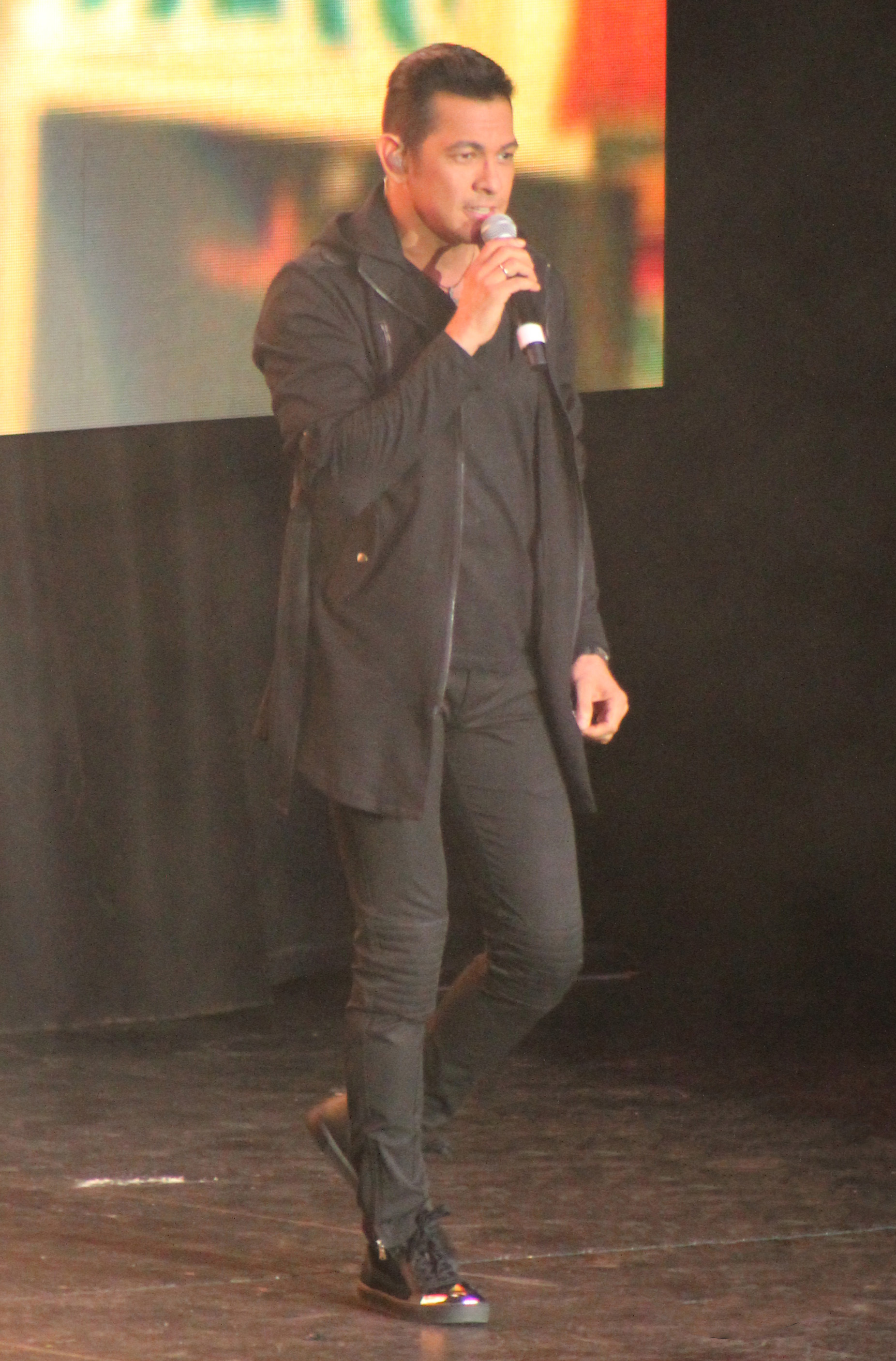
Gary Valenciano and other ABS-CBN artists made a cover for the 25th anniversary of EDSA Revolution.

In order of appearance:

- Gary Valenciano
- Vina Morales
- Martin Nievera
- Zsa Zsa Padilla
- Christian Bautista
- Aiza Seguerra
- Erik Santos
- Toni Gonzaga
- Piolo Pascual
- Sam Milby
- Juris Fernandez
- Yeng Constantino
- Jovit Baldivino

== 2023 remake ==
In celebration of the 37th anniversary of the EDSA Revolution, Jim Paredes released his own cover with a music video, featuring new arrangements and rap segments performed by brothers Elmo Magalona and Arkin Magalona.

=== Artists ===
In order of appearance:

- Bayang Barrios
- Jim Paredes
- Boboy Garovillo
- Nica del Rosario
- Mitch Valdez
- Leah Navarro
- Pinky Marquez
- Audie Gemora
- Celeste Legaspi
- The Company
- Bodjie Pascua
- Edru Abraham
- Becky Demetillo-Abraham
- Raul Montesa
- Bituin Escalante
- Noel Cabangon
- Gab Pangilinan
- Arman Ferrer
- Precious Paula Nicole
- Brigiding
- Tita Baby
- Elmo Magalona
- Arkin Magalona

== In popular culture ==
During the funeral of Corazon Aquino on August 5, 2009, the song was performed as her hours-long funeral cortège began heading to Manila Memorial Park – Sucat. Artists singing inside Manila Cathedral Basilica include Apo Hiking Society, Jose Mari Chan, Sarah Geronimo, Piolo Pascual, Lea Salonga, Regine Velasquez, Ogie Alcasid, Zsa Zsa Padilla, Martin Nievera, Erik Santos, Jed Madela and Dulce. This version of the song is included in the album Maraming Salamat Pres. Aquino: A Memorial Tribute Soundtrack by Star Music.

The song is sung during Buwan ng Wika events held in schools and universities throughout the country every August.

In 2016, the song figured in nationwide protests in the aftermath of the burial of dictator Ferdinand Marcos at the Libingan ng mga Bayani, ousted in the revolution 30 years before.

== See also ==
- Magkaisa, another song associated with the 1986 People Power Revolution.
