= Isuzu 810 =

Isuzu 810 Series
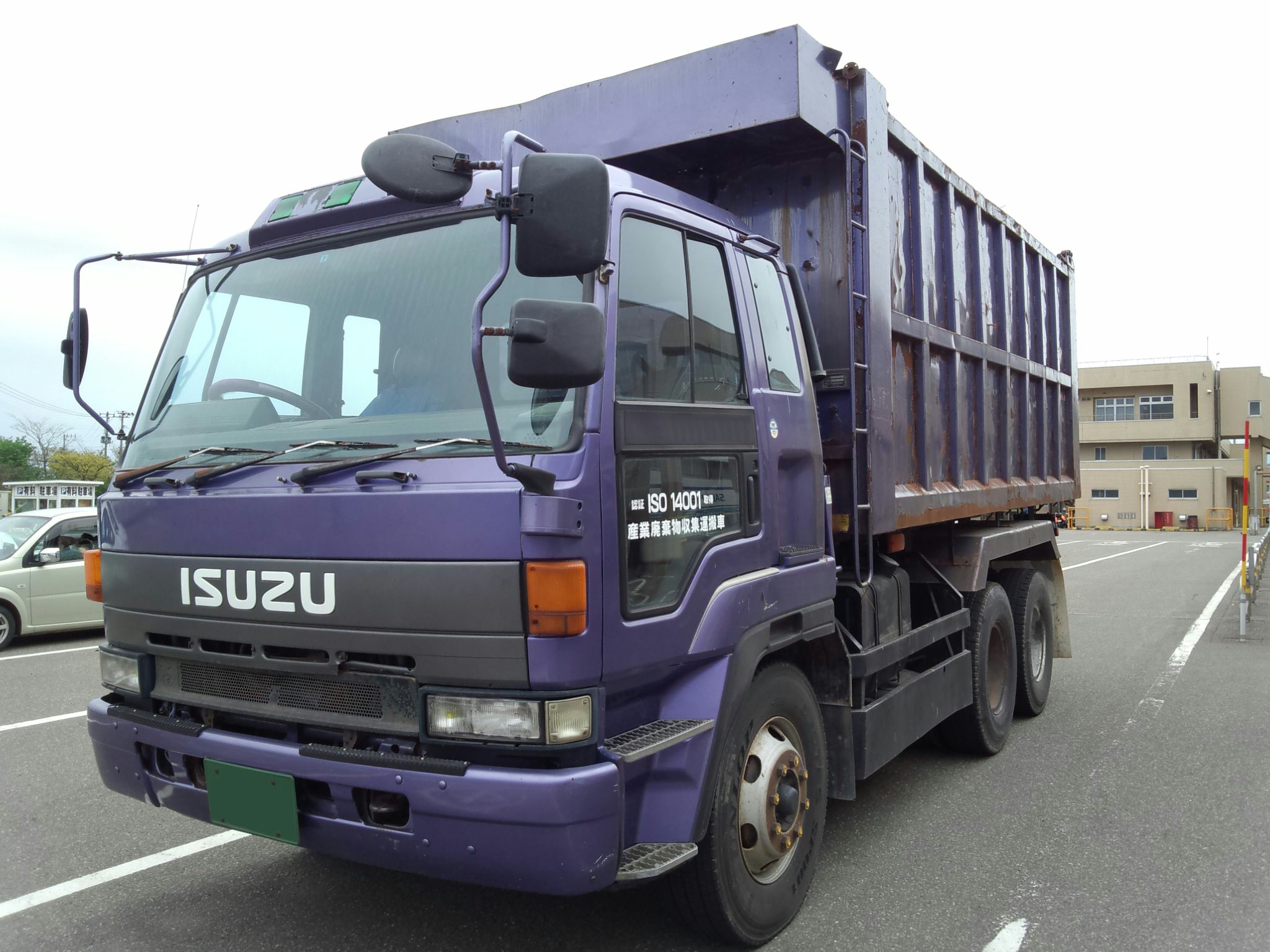
- Isuzu 810EX

Overview
- Manufacturer: Isuzu
- Also called: Isuzu C/E-Series
- Production: 1983–1995

Body and chassis
- Class: Truck
- Related: Hino Super Dolphin

Powertrain
- Transmission: Isuzu (manual/automatic) 7 speed manual (Rigid and 6 wheeler tractor head) 16 speed manual (10 wheeler tractor head only)

Chronology
- Predecessor: Isuzu New Power (V10ss/V12)
- Successor: Isuzu Giga

The Isuzu 810 (kana:いすゞ810) is a heavy duty truck that was produced by Isuzu. First introduced in 1983 as a successor to the Isuzu New Power (including V8SS, V10SS and V12SS) and was replaced by Isuzu Giga in 1995. Outside Japan, the truck series are in the "C" and "E", with "C" indicating a rigid design and "E" being used on semi-tractors. With the domestic competitors were the Nissan Diesel Resona, the Hino Super Dolphin and the Mitsubishi Fuso The Great.

== History ==
The 810 debuted in August 1983 as the successor to the New Power lineup. Although it arrived later than some competitors in terms of full model changes, it introduced several advanced features for its time. One of the most notable innovations was the Engine One-Key System, which allowed drivers to control engine preheating and operation using only the ignition key, simplifying operation and eliminating the need for separate electrical components such as relays and switches.

Comfort was also improved through the introduction of a multi-use seat and bed system, which allowed the passenger and center seats to fold down and expand the sleeping space, an important feature for long-distance drivers. Early models featured round four-headlamp styling, fog lamps, and distinctive step and fender designs.

The 810 lineup was structured according to drive type and usage, with model names such as CX, CV, and EX representing rigid trucks and tractor units. Initially, the "810" name was not strongly emphasized in marketing and appeared mainly inside catalogs rather than on their covers.

In September 1983, the manufacturer expanded the lineup by adding additional tractor variants. These included both V10- and V12-powered semi-tractors, while full-tractor versions were offered exclusively with V12 engines. The tractors were visually distinguished by special markings on the front.

== 810 Super/Super II ==
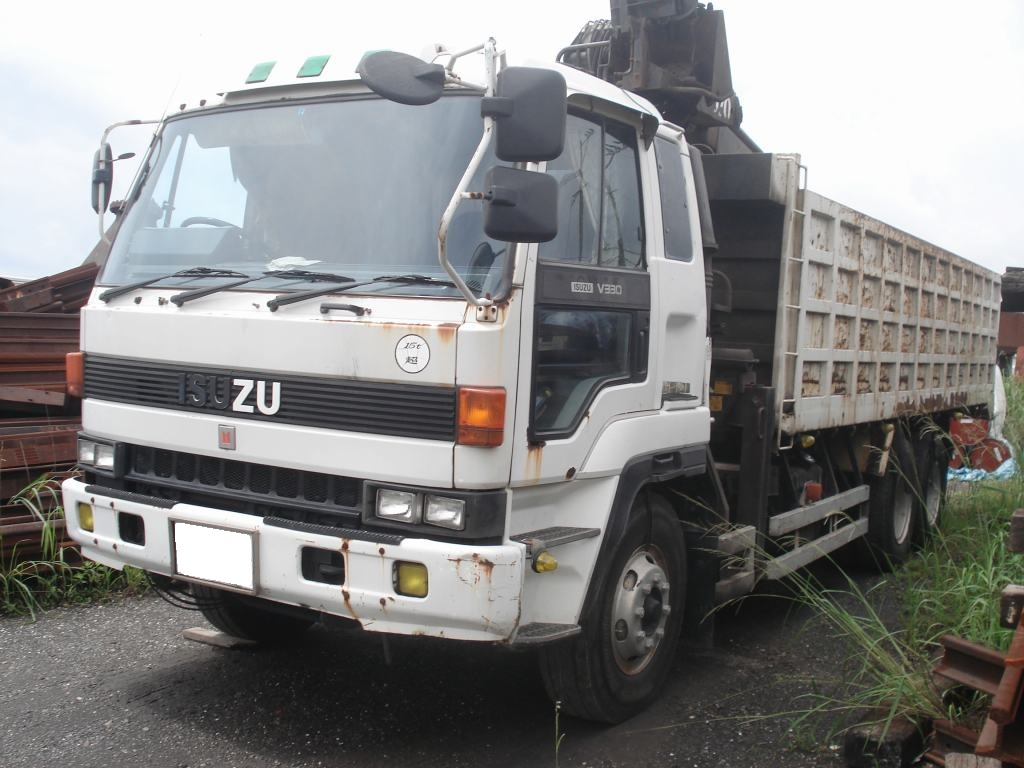
Isuzu 810 Super

By February 1986, the model received a significant update and was renamed the 810 Super. This update is made in compliance with stricter Japanese noise regulations, but it also brought noticeable design and safety improvements. The headlights were changed to rectangular units, the body styling became cleaner with straighter lines, and functional updates like a steering lock system were added. Additionally, performance improved with the introduction of the new 6SD1 turbocharged engine.

In September 1986, Isuzu offers its own automated manual transmission, NAVi 6 as an option. This system helped reduce driver fatigue and represented an early step toward automation in heavy-duty truck operation. By July 1987, Isuzu expanded comfort and ride quality by introducing air suspension-equipped cargo trucks. The inclusion of a leveling valve allowed the truck to maintain a consistent ride height regardless of load, improving stability and cargo protection. Performance was also enhanced with the introduction of the 6RB1 intercooled turbo engine on the CXG model.

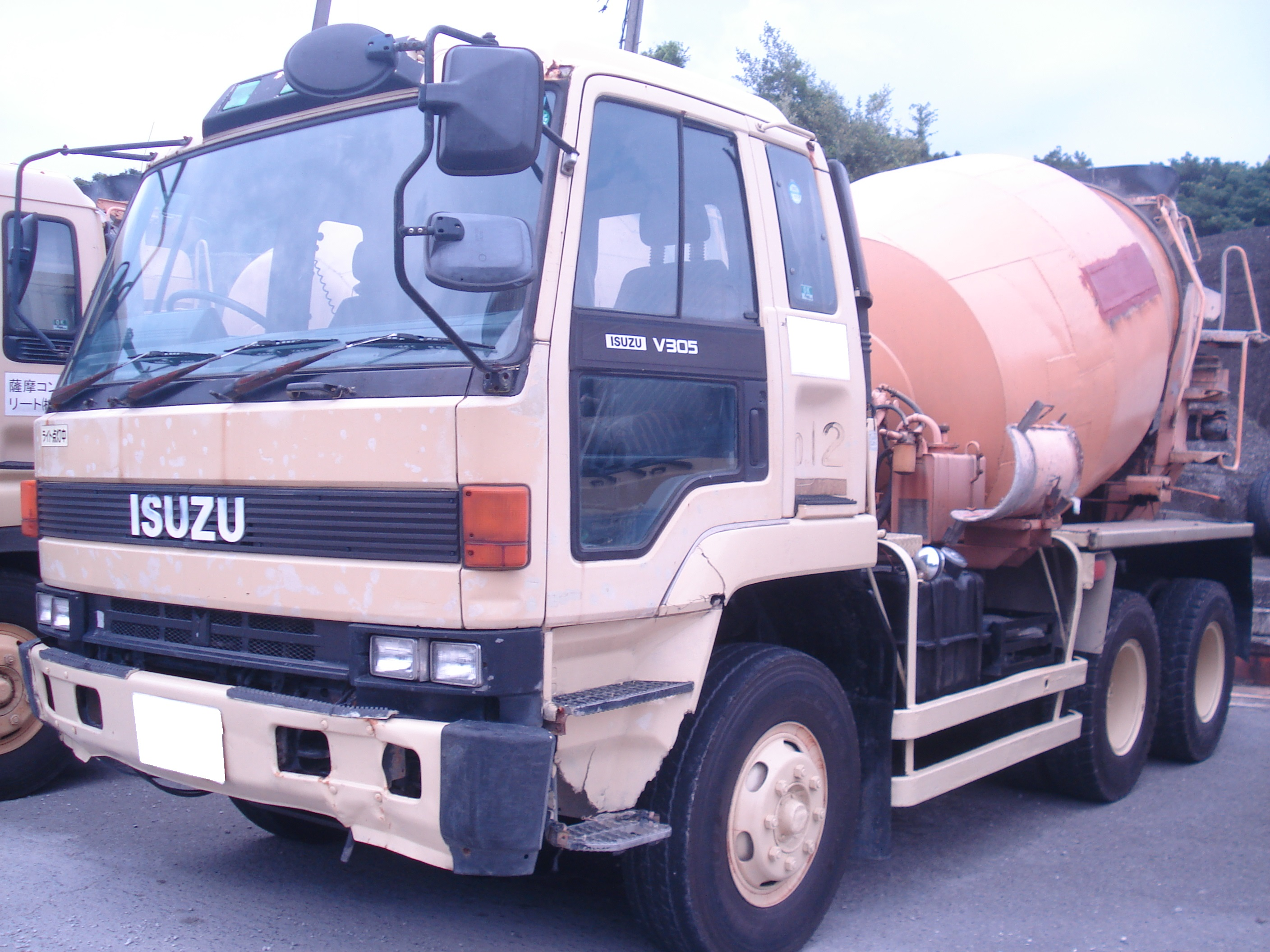
Isuzu 810 Super II

A more comprehensive update arrived in September 1989 with the launch of the 810 Super II. This update modernized both appearance and function. Externally, the front grille was redesigned, the bumper received additional protective rubber, and the Isuzu emblem was revised in both design and placement. The cab’s color theme shifted toward a black-based aesthetic, creating a stronger and more modern visual identity. Even smaller design elements, such as the driver-side window layout and the speed indicator lamp housing, were refined. Inside the cab, comfort and quality improved through a fully trimmed interior. Safety enhancement included with the optional permanent-magnet retarder.

Crucially, the 1989 update also ensured compliance with newly enforced Japanese emissions regulations, which led to changes in model and engine codes across the lineup.

== 810EX ==
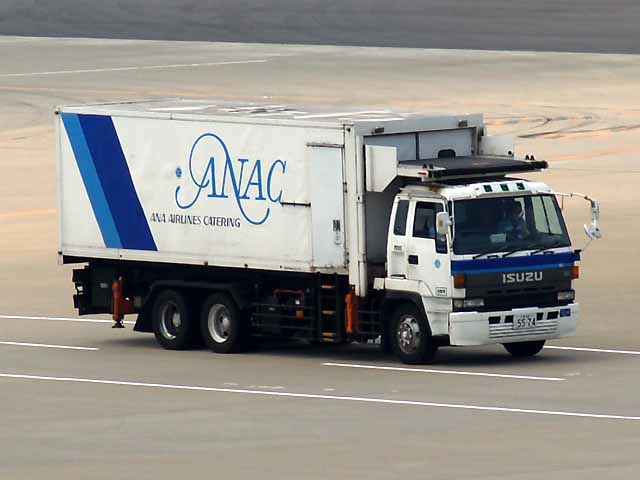
All Nippon Airways Isuzu 810EX

Between 1991 and 1995, the Isuzu 810 series underwent its refresh. In early 1991, safety improvements are added with the introduction of the permanent-magnet retarder on selected models, and Anti-Lock Brakes on all tractor variants. Just a few months later, enhanced driver comfort is achieved by the inclusion of air-suspension seats with automatic weight adjustment standard on all semi-tractor models.

The final refresh occurred in July 1992, when the model received a major facelift and technological update, becoming the Isuzu 810EX. The exterior styling was completely modernized with a new logo, redesigned front mask and newly styled headlights, giving the truck a more contemporary identity. Optional are the chrome accents on the bumpers. The headlight units were shared with other models such as the Elf and Forward.

Functional updates such as integrated fog lamps and a redesigned bumper improved both aesthetics and practicality.

The engine lineup was upgraded with the new 6WA1 24-valve OHC diesel engine, improving efficiency, power delivery, and emissions performance. Safety and driving assistance is also updated, with some models receiving standard retarders and innovative features like Hill Start Assist (HSA).

== Successor ==
The Giga appeared in November 1994, originally only as a rigid truck. The final 810 models were discontinued in mid-1995, by which time the full range of Giga trucks had been introduced.

== Lineup ==
- CXM 6 × 2R
- CXL 6 × 2R ( air suspension )
- CXK 6 × 2R (NK suspension, lightweight leaf suspension )
- CXH 8 × 4
- CVZ 6 × 4 (low-floor vehicle)
- CXZ 6 × 4
- CXG 6 × 2F
- CVR 4 × 2
- EXR 4 × 2 semi-tractor
- EXD 4 × 2 Semi-tractor (air suspension)
- EXZ 6 × 4 Semi-tractor
- CVS 4x4 semi-tractor
- CVS 4 × 4 snowplow
- CXW 6 × 6 snowplow
- ZYZ 6 × 2 Private car on the premises (15t)
- ZZZ 6 × 2 Private car on the premises (20t)

== Engine ==
"Category" in the table below indicates the next two digits of the three letters of the vehicle type alphabet (C ** or EX * above).

Classification	Engine model	Form / method	Displacement (cc)	Output band (PS)	Installation period
14	6QA1	Straight 6 / NA	11,044	220	1983-1989
17	8PC1-N	V8 / NA	12,011	240	1983-1989
17	8PC1-S	V8 / NA	12,011	260	1983-1989
18	6RB1-TC1	Straight-six intercooler turbo	13,741	320	1983-1989
19	10PC1-N	V10 / NA	15,014	295	1983-1989
19	10PC1-S	V10 / NA	15,014	330	1983-1989
21	12PC1-N	V12 / NA	18,010	355	1983-1989
21	12PC1-S	V12 / NA	18,010	395	1983-1989
23	6SD1-TC1	Straight-six intercooler turbo	9,839	280	1986-1994
23	6SD1-TC2	Straight-six intercooler turbo	9,839	300	1986-1994
50	6WA1-TCN	Straight-six intercooler turbo	12,068	315	1992-1994
50	6WA1-TCC	Straight-six intercooler turbo	12,068	350	1992-1994
50	6WA1-TCS	Straight-six intercooler turbo	12,068	380	1992-1994
70	8PD1-N	V8 / NA	13,346	240	1989-1994
70	8PD1-S	V8 / NA	13,346	260	1989-1994
71	10PD1-N	V10 / NA	16,683	305	1989-1994
71	10PD1-S	V10 / NA	16,683	340	1989-1994
72	12PD1-N	V12 / NA	20,019	365	1989-1994
72	12PD1-C	V12 / NA	20,019	395	1989-1994
72	12PD1-S	V12 / NA	20,019	425	1989-1994
