= Bayan Ko =

Patriotic song of the Philippines

"Bayan Ko" (usually translated as 'My Country'; Spanish: Nuestra patria, lit. 'Our Motherland') is a Filipino patriotic song. It was written in Spanish by the revolutionary general José Alejandrino in light of the Philippine–American War and subsequent American occupation, and translated into Tagalog some three decades later by the poet José Corazón de Jesús.

The song, which is a kundiman, is often considered the unofficial second national anthem of the Philippines, and is sometimes sung by overseas Filipinos groups after the "Lupang Hinirang" or by itself. It is sometimes assumed to be a folk song because of its popularity, and due to the nature of its lyrics, it has been used as a protest song by different political groups at various points in Philippine history.

== History ==
=== Origin ===
The Spanish lyrics of "Bayan Ko" were originally written for the Severino Reyes zarzuela, Walang Sugat ("no wound"). Attributed to the propagandista, General José Alejandrino, the song expressed opposition to the ongoing American Occupation. The popular and mainly used 1929 Tagalog version is attributed to José Corazón de Jesús, and the music to Constancio de Guzmán.

=== Protest song during the Marcos dictatorship ===
"Bayan Ko" regained cult popularity during the Marcos dictatorship, with protesters singing their own version in protests. After President Ferdinand Marcos imposed Martial Law in 1972, the song was deemed seditious. Public performances of the song were banned, with violators facing potential arrest and detention. People were emboldened to sing it at the 1983 funeral of Senator Benigno Aquino Jr. and the ensuing 1986 People Power Revolution, where Freddie Aguilar led crowds in singing.

=== Post-EDSA People Power (1986–present) ===
Since the 1986 Revolution that toppled the Marcos government and ushered in the Fifth Republic, the song has been associated with anti-government protests. In February 1987, a cover by pop singer JoAnne Lorenzana was launched as part of a nationalistic campaign by PLDT, and was aired on radio and television for the first anniversary of the Revolution.

On 1 August 2009, "Bayan Ko" was sung as the recessional of the noon Mass at EDSA Shrine, ending the quarant'ore for Corazón Aquino. The service, originally intended to pray for the former leader's recovery, was instead done to mourn her sudden death early that morning. Crowds sang it again during the transfer of her remains from La Salle Green Hills to Manila Cathedral on 3 August for the lying in state. At the Requiem Mass on 5 August, Lea Salonga sang it as the recessional while Aquino's casket was borne out to the Cathedral steps. A military band repeated it as the flatbed hearse carrying the casket and honor guard began the hours-long funeral procession. Mourners sang "Bayan Ko" for the last time with several hymns as Aquino's casket was entombed beside her husband at the couple's mausoleum in Parañaque.

A month later, British all-male chorale group Libera sang "Bayan Ko" as an encore to their first Philippine tour in Cebu and Manila. Moved by the performance, the audience sporadically applauded throughout the group's performance. As part of their Summer Philippine tour the following year, Libera gave an encore performance on the hit noontime variety programme, Showtime on 14 April 2010.

The University of the Philippines Madrigal Singers sang "Bayan Ko" during the inauguration of President Benigno Aquino III and Vice-president Jejomar Binay on 30 June 2010 at the Quirino Grandstand.

In 2016, the song figured in nationwide protests in the aftermath of the burial of former Philippine President Ferdinand Marcos at the Libingan ng mga Bayani. The song has figured in nationwide protests against Philippine president Rodrigo Duterte in 2020.

Following the death of President Benigno Aquino III on 24 June 2021, "Bayan Ko" was sung by mourners and supporters as the urn containing the late president's ashes was buried beside his parents at their mausoleum at the Manila Memorial Park in Paranaque.

== Lyrics ==
Tagalog lyrics:
"Bayan Ko"

Ang bayan kong Pilipinas,
lupain ng ginto’t bulaklak.
Pag-ibig ang sa kaniyáng palad,
nag-alay ng ganda’t dilág.
At sa kaniyáng yumi at ganda,
dayuhan ay nahalina.
Bayan ko, binihag ka,
nasadlak sa dusa.

Ibon mang may layang lumipad,
kulungin mo at umiiyak!
Bayan pa kayáng sakdal-dilag,
ang ‘di magnasang makaalpas?
Pilipinas kong minumutya,
pugad ng luhá ko’t dalita,
aking adhika:
makita kang sakdal laya!

English translation:
"My Country"

LITERAL

My country, the Philippines,
land of gold and flowers,
It was Love that, as per her fate,
Offered up beauty and splendor.
And with her refinement and beauty,
The foreigner was enticed;
My country, you were made captive,
Mired in suffering.

Even the bird that is free to fly,
cage it and it cries!
What more for the country most splendid,
would she not yearn to break free?
Philippines, which I treasure,
Nest of my tears and suffering;
My aspiration:
to see you absolutely free!

MELODIC

Philippines, my country, my homeland
Gold and flowers in her heart abound
Blessings on her fate did love bestow
Sweet beauty's grace and splendor's glow.
How her charms so kind and tender
Drove the stranger to desire her...
Land of mine, in fetters kept,
You suffered as we wept.

Birds that freely claim the skies to fly
When imprisoned mourn, protest and cry!
How more deeply will a land most fair
Yearn to break the chains of sad despair.
Philippines, my life's sole burning fire,
Cradle of my tears and misery...
All that I desire
To see you rise, forever free!

Spanish original:
"Nuestra Patria"

Nuestra Patria Filipina,
cuya tierra es de oro y púrpura.
Tantos tesoros guarda en su lar
que tientan al hurtador.
Y es por eso que el anglosajón,
con vil traición la subyuga;
Patria mía en prisión,
sacúdete del traidor.

Aún el ave libre en su volar,
llora cuando en la jaula está,
cuanto más nuestra Patria de amor
al verse sin paz ni dignidad.
Filipinas de mi corazón,
tus hijos jamás permitirán
que así te robe
tu bienestar y libertad.

=== Lyrical variations ===
The modern Filipino lyrics based on the original Tagalog translation omit all diacritics and contract kaniyang to kanyang.

The lines Pag-ibig ang sa kaniyang palad // nag-alay ng ganda’t dilag has minor variations which subtly change the meaning, revolving around the concept of palad, literally "palm of the hand", but here closer to "fortune" or "fate" (cf. mapalad "fortunate", masamang palad "ill fortune", kapalaran "destiny", gulong ng palad "wheel of fortune").

Pag-ibig nasa kanyang palad, // Nag-alay ng ganda’t dilag as sung by Freddie Aguilar, may be rendered as "With love, as per her fate, she (the country) offered up her beauty and splendor".

Pag-ibig ko sa kanyang palad // nag-alay ng ganda’t dilag as sung by Asin and others, may be rendered as "My love, as per her fate, offered up beauty and splendor to her".

Asin also replaces makita kang sakdal laya "to see you absolutely free" with makita kang malaya "to see you free".

A National Democratic version sung by activists during the 1970s modifies the umiiyak "cry" to pumipiglas "struggle" and adds the coda: Kay sarap mabuhay sa sariling bayan // Kung walang alipin, at may kalayaan. // Ang bayang sinisiil, babangon lalaban din // Ang Silanga’y pupula sa timyas ng paglaya. which roughly translates to "It is pleasant to live in your own country // If there is no slaves and there is freedom. // The oppressed nation, will rise up and fight. // The East will turn red with the sweetness of liberation."

== Arrangements ==
While largely unchanged from the De Guzmán arrangement, the song has renditions by different composers and singers, notably by Lucio D. San Pedro (National Artist for music), Asin, and Freddie Aguilar. Aguilar's cover is one of the most famous renditions of the song; an often overlooked detail is that the instrumental section of this version is "Pilipinas Kong Mahal", another Filipino patriotic song. Asin's rendition included another de Jesús work, "Kay Sarap Mabuhay sa Sariling Bayan", as a preluding stanza to the main lyrics. Sung mostly by Leftist groups, the stanza is included as the bridge replacing "Pilipinas Kong Mahal" with the prelude of "Ang Bayan kong Hirang".

On 7 November 1988, an a capella version by Josephine Roberto, featuring the cast of That's Entertainment, was used for Towering Power: A Musical Dedication, which was for the launching of GMA Network's 777-foot tower.

Allison Opaon sang a Japanese version in Yokohama on 18 November 2006, during a concert-rally against political killings in the Philippines.

This song has also been arranged by Robert Prizeman and sung by the vocal group Libera when touring the Philippines.

Domino de Pio Teodosio (with guitar) sang a special arrangement of "Bayan Ko" by Reginald Vince M. Espíritu (oboe) and Anjo Inacay (cello) at the John F. Kennedy School of Government on 7 March 2011. The performance, which was for visiting world leaders during the school's International Week, was organized by the Philippine Caucus of the Kennedy School.

== In popular culture ==
- In 1984, the song title was used for the film Bayan Ko: Kapit sa Patalim directed by Lino Brocka. The song was censored from the film as one of the conditions for the film's release in the Philippines.
- In 2013, the song was used for a series of the same title.
