= List of Filipino composers =

This is a list of composers who are Filipino.

== A ==
- Rosalina Abejo (1922–1991)
- Nicanor Abelardo (1893–1934)
- Marcelo Adonay (1848–1928)
- Joey Albert (born 1960)
- Nilo Alcala (born 1978)
- Ogie Alcasid (born 1967)
- Johnny Alegre (born 1955)
- Barbie Almalbis (born 1977)
- Nora Aunor (born 1953)

== B ==
- Jonas Baes (born 1961)
- Ely Buendia (born 1970)
- Rico Blanco (born 1973)
- Ladislao Bonus (1854–1908)
- Luis Borromeo (c. 1800/1900)
- Antonino Buenaventura (1904–1996)

== C ==
- Manuel Kabajar Cabase (1921–2003)
- Lito Camo (born 1972)
- George Canseco (1934–2004)
- Ryan Cayabyab (born 1954)
- Levi Celerio (1910–2002)
- Josefino Cenizal (1916–2015)
- Jose Mari Chan (born 1945)
- Jeffrey Ching (born 1965)
- Yeng Constantino (born 1988)
- Teddy Corpuz (born 1978)
- Sheryl Cruz (born 1974)
- Ernani Cuenco (1936–1988)

== D ==
- Jerry Amper Dadap (born 1935)
- Michael Amper Dadap (born 1944)
- Vincent de Jesus (born 1968)
- Diwa de Leon (born 1980)
- Felipe Padilla de León (1912–1992)
- Epifanio de los Santos (1871–1928)
- Moira Dela Torre (born 1993)
- Romeo Diaz (born 1948)
- Jay Durias (born 1975)

== E ==
- Fred Elizalde (1907–1979)
- Jose Estella (1870–1943)

== F ==
- Jaime Fabregas (born 1950)
- Tats Faustino
- Francisco Feliciano (1941–2014)
- Julián Felipe (1861–1944)

== G ==
- Alice Doria-Gamilla (born 1931)
- Jude Gitamondoc (born 1979)
- Gary Granada (born 1960)

== H ==
- Mike Hanopol (born 1946)

== J ==
- Ramon Jacinto (born 1945)
- Danny Javier (1947–2022)
- Jaya (born 1970)
- RJ Jimenez (born 1983)
- Jugs Jugueta (born 1979)

== K ==
- Lucrecia Roces Kasilag (1918–2008)

== M ==
- José Maceda (1917–2004)
- Bamboo Mañalac (born 1976)
- Raul Mitra
- Chito Miranda (born 1976)
- Antonio Molina (1894–1980)
- Morissette (born 1996)

== N ==
- Kitchie Nadal (born 1980)
- Julio Nakpil (1867–1960)
- Joy Nilo (born 1970)

== O ==
- Amada Santos Ocampo (1925–2009)
- Louie Ocampo (born 1960)
- Onecimo Oclarit (born 1951)

== P ==
- Dolores Paterno (1854–1881)
- Rico J. Puno (1953–2018)

== R ==
- Jay R (born 1982)
- Snaffu Rigor (1946–2016)
- Reev Robledo

== S ==
- Lea Salonga (born 1971)
- Gerard Salonga (born 1973)
- Lucio D. San Pedro (1913–2002)
- Francisco Santiago (1889–1947)
- Jesús Manuel Santiago
- Ramon Santos (born 1941)
- Vehnee Saturno (born 1954)
- Aiza Seguerra (born 1983)
- Pepe Smith (1947–2014)
- Tito Sotto (born 1948)
- Max Surban

== T ==
- Jerrold Tarog (born 1977)

== V ==
- Gary Valenciano (born 1964)
- Rey Valera (born 1954)
- Yoyoy Villame (1932–2007)
- Emilio Villareal (1920–2011)

== Z ==
- Ben Zubiri (1911–1969)
