= Jerry Amper Dadap =

Filipino composer and educator

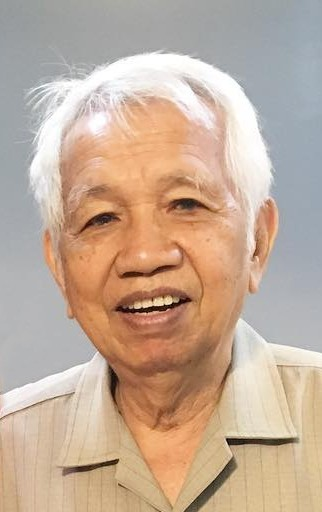
- Jerry Amper Dadap, composer (2018)
- Born: November 5, 1935 (age 91); Hinunangan, Southern Leyte, Commonwealth of the Philippines
- Occupations: Composer, conductor, educator
- Years active: 1959–present
- Organizations: Andrés Bonifacio Concert Choir
- Known for: Philippine nationalist concert music; expansion of the rondalla as a symphonic ensemble
- Notable work: Andrés Bonifacio: Ang Dakilang Anak-Pawis, Alay sa Inang Bayan, Aleluya, Sumikat na ang Araw, Philippine Symphonic Medley

Jerry Amper Dadap (born November 5, 1935) is a Filipino composer, conductor, and educator known for his contributions to Philippine nationalist music. His work is associated with post-independence developments in Philippine art music. He is particularly noted for expanding the symphonic and concert repertoire of the Philippine rondalla. Dadap has composed orchestral, choral, rondalla, and theater works that integrate classical concert forms with elements of Filipino musical traditions, frequently drawing on Philippine historical and cultural themes. His works have been performed in the Philippines and internationally.

== Early life and family ==
Dadap was born on November 5, 1935, in Hinunangan, Southern Leyte, the ninth of fourteen children of Vedasto Dadap and Dionisia Amper. He attributed his early musical exposure primarily to his mother’s family, the Ampers of Bohol, who were known locally for their musical activities. His maternal grandfather formed a small-town orchestra made up of coconut field workers and taught them solfeggio and instrumental performance.

He married the late Celeste Dadap (née Icban), who earned a master’s degree in music education from Columbia University in New York City and taught humanities at the University of the East. She died on March 3, 2002. They had four children: Jerry Jr., a composer and classical guitarist who is also trained as a physicist; Gerald, a visual artist; Jeremy, a violinist; and Bettina Celeste, a singer. His younger brother, Michael Amper Dadap, is a classical guitarist and composer. Michael has credited Jerry with giving him his first musical instruction before he went on to study professionally in the Philippines and the United States.

== Education and career ==
Dadap’s earliest formal music instruction came from his elder sister, Feri, who taught him organ and piano for church settings. He later studied theology at Silliman University in Dumaguete City (1954–1956), where he continued music studies and began composing songs and choral works while remaining active in church music. He then enrolled at the Conservatory of Music of the University of the Philippines, where he earned a Bachelor of Music in Composition and Conducting in 1963.

In 1957, while still a student at the University of the Philippines College of Music, Dadap composed Pagmahay, which he later recalled as his first commissioned work. The song was dedicated to Luz B. Magsaysay, the widow of President Ramon Magsaysay. Dadap composed the melody, while his cousin Castor Lee Amper wrote the lyrics. Originally titled Hinagpis, the song was later given the Visayan title Pagmahay by Dadap.

In 1959, Dadap composed his first orchestral work, the symphonic poem The Passionate and the Wild, which won Second Prize at the National Composition Contest in 1960. He later described the work as “modern” in style and noted that it was written before he had received formal training in orchestration, drawing instead on his experience performing with the University of the Philippines Symphony Orchestra.

In addition, Dadap served as a carillonneur of the UP Diliman Carillon from 1960 to 1964. He was the fourth carillon player at the university, following Flora Zarco-Rivera, Wesley Tabayoyong, and Crisostomo Gonzales. During his tenure, Dadap performed daily programs that included university hymns, Western classical repertoire, Filipino folk songs, and popular music of the period, at the request of then UP president Carlos P. Romulo. These performances, together with his work as a janitor at a men’s dormitory, provided income while he was a working student at the university.

During this period, Dadap was active as both a conductor and educator. He served as conductor of the Concert Philippines Symphony Orchestra and began teaching music and rondalla at Ramon Magsaysay High School in Cubao, Quezon City, where he remained from 1962 to 1968. A 1964 issue of The Apprentice: Commencement Issue published "C.H.S. Hymn" (Cubao High School hymn), which Dadap composed; the same music is used in the school's present-day RMCHS Hymn, with "C.H.S." changed to "R.M.C.H.S." in the lyrics.

Concert program notes described this period as formative in his efforts to develop the rondalla as a vehicle for symphonic composition and to explore its orchestral possibilities. Shortly after graduating from the University of the Philippines, he served as musical director of the Filipinescas Dance Troupe, directed by choreographer Leonor Orosa-Goquingco, during its 1964 world tour.

On January 24, 1967, Dadap was featured in a Concert Philippines presentation at the Philamlife Auditorium titled "An Evening with the Chorus, Rondalla and Orchestra," which included the world premieres of his Choral Cycle No. 2 and Symphony No. 1 (Primeval), as well as his Choral Symphonic Ode No. 1 and symphonic poem The Passionate and the Wild. During this period, he also served as a regular conductor for the Quezon City Teachers Choral Society.

On March 12, 1968, shortly before leaving for the United States, Dadap staged a farewell concert presented by Concert Philippines at the Philamlife Auditorium in Manila, featuring the world premiere of his Symphony No. 2 (Enfant Terrible) and the premiere of his Song Cycle for Baritone and Orchestra, with texts by poets Bayani M. de Leon, Benjamin V. Afuang, and Jose Lansang Jr., performed by bass-baritone Emmanuel Gregorio with the Concert Philippines Symphony Orchestra, with Sergio Esmilla as concertmaster.

Reviewing the event for The Manila Times, critic Exequiel S. Molina described Symphony No. 2 as characterized by dense blocks of sound and the juxtaposition of atonal and polyrhythmic passages, noting Dadap’s growing focus on contemporary compositional techniques and “absolute music,” then uncommon in Philippine symphonic literature.

In the same year, Dadap received a study-observation grant to the USA, from the Music Promotion Foundation of the Philippines, a government music promotion body created under Republic Act No. 1370. From 1968 to 1971, he pursued advanced studies in composition at the Mannes College of Music in New York City on a full scholarship from the United Presbyterian Church (USA). He obtained a post-graduate diploma in Composition from the institution in 1971.

According to the Encyclopedia of Philippine Art, Dadap was the first Filipino to conduct his own works at Carnegie Recital Hall in New York City in 1971. Contemporary accounts further document his active concert presence in the United States during this period, including a 1971 concert of his works at Mannes College of Music in New York City, listed in the Village Voice concert calendar. He also presented his music at composers’ symposia and academic institutions abroad, including the New England Conservatory of Music in Boston (1970), Yale University (1971), and the Conservatoire de musique de Montréal (1971), where his works were heard by international audiences.

In The New York Times, critic Peter G. Davis reviewed the Carnegie concert, noting the composer’s emphasis for formal symmetry and structural clarity in his chamber music. Davis described that the second movement of Symphony No. 2 (1967), performed for string orchestra, stood apart stylistically, describing it as “pleasantly impressionistic,” “melodically direct,” and “altogether more inventive.”

Upon returning to the Philippines later in 1971, he became active as a music educator, teaching theory, ear training, composition, and orchestration at the Conservatory of Music of the Santa Isabel College of Manila, and later serving on the faculty of the University of Santo Tomas Conservatory of Music.

== Major works ==
Early in his career, Dadap was recognized in Art: Perception and Appreciation as a composer of note for works that integrate Filipino indigenous ensembles with symphonic concert forms. This approach is evident in works such as Choral Symphonic Ode No. 1 for Chorus, Rondalla, and Orchestra. He also explored indigenous instruments in theater works such as Lam-ang: Son of Namongan, Tomaneg at Aniway, and Sultan Kudarat.

=== Dance and ballet works ===
Dadap composed music for modern dance and ballet and collaborated with several Filipino choreographers.

One of his early works in this area is Lam-ang: Son of Namongan (1974), a theatrical production based on the Ilocano epic Biag ni Lam-ang that included a ballet component. The ballet was choreographed by Corazon Generoso Iñigo for the UE Dance Company. The production has been described in the literature as an early adaptation of a Filipino epic into modern ballet.

In 1975, Dadap composed the music for Tomaneg at Aniway, a modern dance work choreographed by Gener Caringal that drew on indigenous ritual and performance traditions as structural sources for contemporary ballet and modern dance.

In 1980, he composed the music for La Lampara, a ballet staged by Ballet Philippines and choreographed by Basilio Esteban S. Villaruz. Villaruz later noted that Dadap conceived the score as an abstract musical work, which the choreographer shaped into a narrative portraying José Rizal’s final hours. The ballet was revived in 1991 in connection with the centenary of El Filibusterismo and has been cited for its symbolic treatment of Rizal’s life and ideals.

=== Theater and multimedia works ===
The Redemption (1974) was commissioned by cultural advocate Victor Puyat for the unveiling of Eduardo Castrillo’s Last Supper monument at Loyola Memorial Park in Marikina. The work was completed in 1974 and first publicly performed on April 25, 1976, at the Union Church of Manila under the sponsorship of the Loyola Group of Companies. Redemption is a large-scale orchestral and choral work that includes the seminal choral piece Aleluya, which was later adapted as an a cappella work and has since been performed in the Philippines and abroad.

In 2004, Aleluya was included in a yearlong series of all-Filipino concerts by the San Miguel Philharmonic Orchestra and the San Miguel Master Chorale, where it was described as technically demanding and characterized by polymetrical rhythm. A contemporary review noted that Dadap's Aleluya concluded the first half of the concert program with "a vibrant, rhythmically exciting work that spanned a dynamic, wide range." In a 2014 review of the album Beyond the Eastern Wind by the Danish choir Collegium Vocale in International Record Review, critic William Hedley described the piece as “a highly rhythmic, tonal cry of joy.”

A later large-scale sacred work, The Resurrection and Redemption Story (2007), was commissioned by St. Stephen High School for its 90th foundation anniversary and premiered as part of the choral concert Images of Christ in Manila. Scored for chorus, soloists, and orchestra, the work depicts the Passion, Death, and Resurrection of Christ and concludes with Dadap’s choral setting Aleluya, a piece that also appears in his earlier oratorio The Redemption.

Andrés Bonifacio: Ang Dakilang Anak-Pawis (1979) ("Andrés Bonifacio, The Great Plebeian") is a musical based on the life of revolutionary leader Andrés Bonifacio. It was first presented in 1979 at the Cultural Center of the Philippines Main Theater (now Tanghalang Nicanor Abelardo) with an original cast of 200 performers. Dadap collaborated with playwright Dionisio Salazar and poet Rogelio Mangahas, both Palanca Award recipients, who served as librettists, and Paulino Capitulo as historical consultant. The title role of Bonifacio was portrayed by baritone Elmo Makil, with Gregoria de Jesus sung by mezzo-soprano Jay Valencia-Glorioso, and the narrator played by Tommy Abuel. The production was sponsored by businessman Alfonso “Jing” Puyat and was scored for orchestra and choir.

While the work is commonly described as a musical in Philippine sources, international theatre surveys and scholarly journal articles have also classified it among original Filipino operas of the late twentieth century. The work has been noted as a popular musical in the Philippines, and has continued to be staged in later years; coverage in the Philippine Daily Inquirer reports on productions mounted in 2013 and 2014.

Dadap also composed an opera on San Lorenzo Ruiz, commissioned by the University of Santo Tomas Conservatory of Music. Titled Lorenzo Ruiz, Escribano, the work is regarded as the first opera on the first Filipino saint and was staged as a contemporary opera in a three-day run at the Phil-Am Life Auditorium in Manila on February 22–24, 1994, with the premiere conducted by Herminigildo Ranera. The opera was based on Lorenzo Ruiz, Escribano: A Play in Two Acts by Ophelia Alcantara Dimalanta, which Dadap set to music; the libretto used a Filipino translation by Florentino Hornedo, and the production was directed by Isagani R. Cruz.

=== Symphonies ===
Dadap composed five symphonies between 1967 and 2021. In a 2025 article in the Philippine Daily Inquirer, arts and culture journalist Amadís Ma. Guerrero identified the symphonies as Dadap’s principal orchestral works.

Symphony No. 1: Primeval (1967) and Symphony No. 2: Enfant Terrible (1968) were composed during Dadap’s early period of orchestral and theater activity and were performed in Manila soon after they were completed. The second movement of Symphony No. 2 was later performed in New York.

Dadap returned to the symphonic genre decades later with Symphony No. 3: Symphony of Bamboos (2018) and Symphony No. 4: Mudra Ballerina (2019). Guerrero described these works as incorporating indigenous instruments and nontraditional conceptual elements. Dadap completed Symphony No. 5: The Wrath of Prakrti and Ragatmika-Bhakti in 2021.

Guerrero noted that while the first two symphonies were performed at the time of their composition, the latter three had not been presented in full as of 2025. He also reported that the Philippine Philharmonic Orchestra had expressed interest in performing Symphony No. 5. The work was announced for a March 13, 2026 performance by the orchestra under conductor Grzegorz Nowak, but the program for that concert instead featured operatic repertoire and other works, and did not include the symphony.

The world premiere of Symphony No. 5 was subsequently rescheduled for January 15, 2027. It was officially programmed to be performed at the Samsung Performing Arts Theater as part of the Philippine Philharmonic Orchestra's 42nd concert season, 'Modulatio'.

=== Rondalla compositions ===
Dadap composed a number of works for rondalla, including large-scale concert pieces. The Encyclopedia of Philippine Art notes that he was among the first Filipino composers to explore the symphonic potential of the Philippine rondalla. In a survey of Philippine musical traditions edited by John Iremil E. Teodoro, National Artist for Music Ramon P. Santos lists Dadap among post-independence composers who expanded the rondalla repertoire beyond its traditional role as folk accompaniment. Santos notes that these composers produced transcriptions of light classical works and composed original rondalla music that explored the ensemble’s timbral range. Musicologist Corazon Canave-Dioquino lists Dadap among composers who wrote more serious concert works for the rondalla, placing his music within the semi-classical tradition of Philippine music after 1898.

Historical accounts of the Philippine rondalla identify Dadap among formally trained Filipino composers associated with the development of the rondalla as an art-music and concert ensemble during the twentieth century.

Dadap’s rondalla works include extended compositions based on Philippine folk material. Among these are the Five Medleys for Children’s Rondalla, based on Philippine folk songs such as Condansoy, Magtanim ay ’di biro, Bahay kubo, Paru-parong bukid, Sampaguita, and Cariñosa. He also composed the Philippine Symphonic Medley, a rondalla work based on Filipino folk songs, which received First Prize at the 1967 National Rondalla Composition Contest sponsored by the Manila Times.

In a 2025 article in the Philippine Daily Inquirer, arts and culture journalist Amadís Ma. Guerrero reported that Dadap composed fifteen balitaws for rondalla. Guerrero wrote that these works use the balitaw, a Visayan song-dance form, as the musical basis for concert pieces rather than as accompaniment for dance.

== Other selected works ==
In addition to his symphonies and major theatrical compositions, Dadap wrote symphonic, choral, sacred, and experimental works. One of his earliest recognized compositions is the symphonic poem The Passionate and the Wild (1960), which received Second Prize in the National Composition Contest. The work is listed in the University of the Philippines library catalog as a standalone orchestral score.

During the 1960s and 1970s, Dadap composed large-scale concert and theatrical works. These include Mangamuyo II (1977), scored for indigenous Filipino instruments and premiered by Dadap at the CCP Little Theatre in October 1977. Choral Symphonic Ode No. 1: Alay sa Inang Bayan ("Offering to the Motherland") is a work for chorus, rondalla, and orchestra, composed by Dadap in 1963. It was written for the Bonifacio National Centennial Composition Contest and was first performed in 1965 at the Philamlife Auditorium, with the composer conducting. The text was written by Castor Lee Amper Jr., a first cousin of Dadap.

The work has continued to appear in concert programs. In July 2025, it was performed at the DUYOG: The 1st International Youth Orchestra Festival celebration concert at the GSIS Theater by ensembles that included the Manila Symphony Junior Orchestra and the Children's Orchestra Society of New York.

Another patriotic piece from Dadap’s early concert repertoire is Sumikat na ang Araw, which he composed in 1963 to a poem by Andrés Bonifacio titled Katapusang Tawag ("Final Call"). It was first performed in March 1968 by tenor Mamerto Villaba, accompanied by the Concert Philippines Orchestra under Dadap’s direction. The work was performed again in 1972 by Villaba at the Philamlife Auditorium and the CCP Main Theater, with the Manila Symphony Orchestra and Philippine Chamber Chorale. Music scholar Ena Maria R. Aldecoa identifies the work as part of the continuing nationalist tradition in Philippine art music, noting its inspiration from Bonifacio’s revolutionary text.

In 1975, Dadap composed Mga Awit Pambayan, a song cycle to poems by Rolando S. Tinio, a National Artist of the Philippines for Theater and Literature. Commissioned by the Department of Public Information, it was premiered that year at the Cultural Center of the Philippines. The cycle consists of six songs: "Nalabnot at Sukat", "Yakap-yakap ang Lahat", "Kay Ganda ng Maya", "Dayuhan, Ingatan ang Pagyapak", "Inang Tahanan", and "Kung Ako'y Mamatay".

In addition to nationalist and theatrical works, Dadap produced experimental compositions early in his career. One example is Three Short Pieces for Flute and Metronome (1972), which uses the metronome as an independent temporal element.

Dadap is also represented in Philippine Protestant sacred music; his works are included in Ang Pilipino Himnal ("The Filipino Hymnal"), a national hymn collection documenting Filipino religious composers of the latter half of the twentieth century. Dadap composed sacred and choral music for congregational and choral use. His hymn Death Steals Like a Thief (Filipino: Dahil sa pagpanaw ng mahal sa buhay), with text by Cirilo A. Rigos and an English paraphrase by Rolando S. Tinio, appears in Sound the Bamboo: Asian Hymns (no. 170). The tune, Pagyao (“Departure”), uses modal mixture, chromatic inflection, and a drone-like opening gesture.

Dadap also contributed works to Buksan Mo ang Aming mga Labi: Mga Awit na Pangkoro (1982), an anthology of Filipino liturgical music edited by National Artist for Music Francisco Feliciano. Dadap's contributions to the collection include Ang Pag-ibig ng Diyos (“The Love of God”) and Iisa Lamang ang Katawan (“There Is Only One Body”).

Dadap served as music editor for the educational songbooks Let’s Sing Christmas (1972) and O the Wonder. Wonder. Wonder of It All (1972), both edited by Eunice Blanchard Poethig and published by New Day Publishers in Quezon City. The former includes Naririto na naman ang Pasko (“Christmas Is Here Again”), with lyrics by National Artist Levi Celerio and music by Dadap; an arrangement of the piece is listed in the University of the Philippines library catalog as a published mixed-voice choral score. The latter combines songs, hymns, prayers, and readings, and includes Philippine religious and vernacular works.

== Awards and recognition ==
- Second Prize, National Composition Contest (1960) for The Passionate and the Wild
- "Outstanding Musician" award (1960) by the University of the Philippines Committee on Annual Awards
- First Prize, National Rondalla Composition Contest (1967) for Philippine Symphonic Medley, based on Philippine folksongs. Sponsored by the Manila Times Publishing Company. The work was later selected as an official set contest piece in the 2007 NAMCYA competition at the Cultural Center of the Philippines (CCP).
- Distinguished Service Award Medal from the International Order of DeMolay (1965) for his composition the “DeMolay Hymn”
- Citation from the Filipino Society of Composers, Authors and Publishers (FILSCAP). In 2009, FILSCAP honored Dadap in a special concert at the Philamlife Theater in Manila, recognizing his long-standing contributions to Philippine classical music alongside composers Alfredo Buenaventura and Francisco Feliciano.
- Award for Meritorious Achievement in Music as an outstanding son of Southern Leyte (1968)

== Legacy ==
Dadap’s legacy has been discussed in Philippine music scholarship in terms of nationalism, institutional leadership, and long-term educational influence.

=== Nationalism and cultural advocacy ===
In reference works on Philippine music, Dadap is described as part of the generation of Filipino composers active after independence who pursued nationalist expression through large-scale concert traditions. Grove Music Online identifies him as an associate member of the League of Filipino Composers and aligns him with figures such as Alfredo Buenaventura, Ramon Santos, and Francisco Feliciano. The League's 1975 directory states that Dadap became an associate member in 1974. The Garland Encyclopedia of World Music similarly counts Dadap among a generation of Filipino neoclassicist composers—including Buenaventura, Angel Peña, and Rosendo Santos. Both sources describe these composers as reflecting a heightened awareness of Philippine musical identity.

National Artist for Music Ramon Santos likewise places Dadap within a nationalist current of Filipino art music, citing his contributions to symphonies, concertos, symphonic poems, and orchestral song cycles. Santos characterizes Dadap’s compositional approach as eclectic, noting that his works range from conventional tonal idioms to pieces incorporating indigenous sonorities and more experimental techniques. Raul M. Sunico described Dadap's music as combining indigenous and nationalist themes with "modern tonal structures and new instrumental techniques related to early avant-garde practice," citing works such as Mga Awit ng Bayan, The Redemption, and Mangamuyo.

As early as 1967, National Artist for Music Antonio J. Molina publicly identified Dadap as a leading figure in efforts to elevate the Philippine rondalla into a concert and symphonic medium. In a lecture titled Aspects of Philippine Culture: Music of the Philippines, presented under the auspices of the National Museum of the Philippines, Molina cited Dadap’s "noble and lofty objective" of giving “a distinct symphonic personality” to the native rondalla. Molina singled out Dadap’s 1965 concert, which featured works such as Balitaw No. 1 for Rondalla, Choral Cycle No. 1 for Rondalla and Chorus, and Choral Symphonic Ode for Rondalla, Chorus and Orchestra, as representative of this artistic direction.

In the same lecture, Molina also included Dadap among Filipino composers associated with contemporary musical concepts and idioms, alongside José Maceda, Angel Peña, Eliseo M. Pajaro, and Lucrecia R. Kasilag in a discussion of modern developments in Philippine composition.

Molina's observations on Dadap's efforts to expand the artistic scope of the rondalla were later reflected in works such as Philippine Symphonic Medley for Rondalla, which won a national competition in 1967 and entered the core repertory of Philippine rondalla performance. A 2007 Philippine Daily Inquirer report identified the work as among original rondalla compositions regarded as part of the national musical heritage, noting that it continued to be performed in major competitions, including the National Music Competitions for Young Artists.

Filipino historian and cultural commentator Xiao Chua has further characterized Dadap’s career as a sustained contribution to nation-building, citing his commitment to composing and performing works centered on Philippine history and national heroes, as well as his lifelong role in teaching and mentoring several generations of Filipino musicians, including those without access to formal musical training.

During the period of cultural “Filipinization” at the Cultural Center of the Philippines (CCP) following the 1986 People Power Revolution, Dadap co-conducted the Philippine Philharmonic Orchestra in the Konsiyertong Makabayan, an all-Filipino nationalist concert program that featured major works from the Philippine art music repertory. In the same year, he publicly criticized disparities in institutional funding between Western and Filipino musicians in a letter to Business Day, advocating the creation of a national orchestra composed of Filipino indigenous instruments.

Contemporary accounts further document how Dadap’s nationalist commitments were realized in practice. Despite opportunities to pursue a career abroad, he chose to remain in the Philippines and sustained regular performances devoted to Filipino traditional, choral, and orchestral music, often prioritizing cultural advocacy and public access over commercial viability. A 2007 Philippine Daily Inquirer profile likewise documents Dadap’s nationalist ethos in practice, quoting him as stating that the mission of the Andrés Bonifacio Concert Choir was to “awaken the Filipinos’ love and passion for our country through music,” and emphasizing the ensemble’s exclusive focus on patriotic Filipino repertoire.

=== Institutional and community impact ===
Dadap founded the Concert Philippines Society, later known as the Andrés Bonifacio Concert Choir (ABCC), which provided training for Filipino singers and performed repertoire centered on Filipino compositions. The ABCC was formally organized in 1983, with its initial membership drawn from the cast of the musical Andrés Bonifacio, Ang Dakilang Anak Pawis. Conceived as a community-based ensemble, the ABCC brought together musicians from diverse professional backgrounds, including students, educators, medical professionals, and other working Filipinos, and became known for performing an exclusively Filipino repertoire of patriotic, religious-folk, and art music. Contemporary reviews described the choir as a vehicle for the preservation and performance of Philippine musical heritage, presenting repertoire ranging from songs associated with the Philippine Revolution to works by twentieth-century Filipino composers and excerpts from Dadap's musical Andrés Bonifacio: Ang Dakilang Anak Pawis.

Earlier in his career, Dadap inaugurated the Lahi ("Heritage") concert series in 1972, an initiative aimed at encouraging and popularizing Filipino compositions. That same year, Billboard reported the release of Lahi, a Villar Records album featuring works associated with Philippine national heroes, for which Dadap conducted the Manila Symphony Orchestra and the Philippine Concert Rondalla. He later organized the Andrés Bonifacio Music Foundation in 1979, which supported multiple performing ensembles, including the Andrés Bonifacio Concert Choir and the Andrés Bonifacio Rondalla.

In 2007, he collaborated with Fr. Benigno P. Beltran to form the Smokey Mountain Children’s Choir in Tondo, Manila. Dadap provided regular musical instruction, waiving professional fees and receiving only transportation allowances. The initiative was reported as a community-based effort that provided music education to children in Tondo. A 2009 Manila Times report noted that Dadap provided sustained mentorship to the choir, conducting weekly vocal training sessions over a six-month period beginning in late 2007 as part of a program supported by the National Commission for Culture and the Arts, and that the group later appeared on television and participated in performances abroad.

Dadap’s musical play Andrés Bonifacio: Ang Dakilang Anak-Pawis (1979) continued to be revived in later decades, with productions mounted almost yearly during the 1990s. These performances featured professional singers in leading roles, including Elmo Makil as Andrés Bonifacio and sopranos May Bayot and Lani Misalucha as Gregoria de Jesús. Commentators have further observed that Dadap’s portrayal of the Philippine Revolution gave particular prominence to women figures—especially Gregoria de Jesús and Melchora Aquino (Tandang Sora)—whose roles are treated as integral to the dramatic narrative rather than as supporting figures. In 2019, excerpts were performed by the Andrés Bonifacio Concert Choir under his direction in a benefit concert supporting indigenous Aeta children.

In 2013, during nationwide commemorations of the 150th birth anniversary of Andrés Bonifacio, Andrés Bonifacio: Ang Dakilang Anak-Pawis was revived in productions by the University of the East and the University of the Philippines College of Music. The latter was presented as part of the 50th anniversary celebration of Abelardo Hall and the college's 97th anniversary. Directed by Alegria O. Ferrer, the production ran for three performances on September 16, 17, and 20. The same year, the Manila Concert Choir included songs from the musical in an all-Filipino concert commemorating Bonifacio's sesquicentennial. In an interview about the production, the choir’s leadership described Dadap’s musical as “perhaps the most beautiful musical about the national hero.”

Dadap’s work has been formally integrated into Philippine music education. He is featured in Horizons: Grade 10 Learner’s Materials – Music and Arts Appreciation for Young Filipinos, a Department of Education–approved textbook used in public secondary schools nationwide. The textbook classifies Dadap among composers of experimental and contemporary “New Music” in the Philippines and presents his work alongside that of figures such as José Maceda, Lucrecia Kasilag, Ramon Santos, and Francisco Feliciano. A biographical section details his education and career, while multiple chapters reference his compositions in listening guides, classroom exercises, and evaluative activities on contemporary Philippine music and musical theater, including Andrés Bonifacio: Ang Dakilang Anak-Pawis.

=== Critical assessment ===
Cultural journalist Amadís Ma. Guerrero, writing in the Philippine Daily Inquirer, described Dadap as a prolific composer whose music is shaped by nationalist, sacred, and romantic themes. Guerrero highlighted Dadap’s wide output since the early 1960s, including his role in bringing the rondalla and large-scale choral and theatrical works into the Philippine concert tradition, and identified Andrés Bonifacio: Ang Dakilang Anak-Pawis as a central work in his oeuvre. In a later article, Guerrero also discussed Dadap’s symphonic cycle, noting its extended compositional span and the importance of personal dedication and spiritual reflection within his work.
