= Baybay National High School =

- Mataas na Paaralang Pambansa ng Baybay

Location
- (Philippines) Baybay, Leyte; Philippines
- Coordinates: 10°40′27″N 124°48′17″E

Information
- Type: Public High School
- Established: 1945
- Principal: Maximina Doronio
- Grades: 7 to 12
- Enrollment: 4,000+
- Campus: Urban
- Athletics: Basketball, Badminton, Soccer, Gymnastics, Athletics (Track & Field), Lawn Tennis, Sepak Takraw, Swimming, Table Tennis, Taekwando, Volleyball, Boxing, Arnis (recently added)

Baybay National High School is a public high school located at 30 de Deciembre St., Zone 12, Baybay, Leyte, Philippines. It is considered as the biggest High School in the whole city in terms of land area and population. Also, it is the first Public High School established in Baybay in the year 1945. At present, it has a population of over 4,000 students, with 26 sections for Grade 7, 23 sections Grade 8, 21 sections in the Grade 9 and 17 sections in Grade 10. It has three curricula, namely: Engineering and Science Education Program, Special Program in the Arts, Special Program for Sports and Basic Education Curriculum.

== Curriculum Offerings ==
- Engineering and Science Education Program is a science and mathematics oriented curriculum devised for high schools in the Philippines. It is mainly operated by the DepEd or the Department of Education. It offers Science, Mathematics, Filipino, Social Studies or Araling Panlipunan, Technology and Livelihood Education (Information and Communications Technology), MAPEH and Values Education. It also offers research as a subject, starting in Grade 7. It has two sections, namely; Science and Technology, which is available from Grades 7, 8, 9 & 10. A student that will enroll must have an average grade of 85% and above.
- Special Program in the Arts (SPA) is a program made by the Department of Education of the Philippines to give talented students a chance to enhance their talents in different fields. There are five fields in the SPA: Creative Writing (English), Visual Arts, Theater Arts, Music, Dance and Media Arts. It has section, called SPA, in all year levels.
- Basic Education Curriculum (BEC) offers science, mathematics, Filipino, social studies or Araling Panlipunan, Technology and Livelihood Education, MAPEH and Values Education.

== Sports ==
- The school actively participates the annual Baybay City Athletic Meet, the athletic event of the whole Baybay, (Last 2010, it became Baybay Town Athletic Meet after the city lost its cityhood status) every month of October. The winners after the said event will join some athletic meet just like Cluster Meet (athletic event in the 5th district-A of Leyte), Area Meet (athletic event of the whole 5th district of Leyte) and lastly, the Provincial Meet (athletic event of the Province of Leyte).
- The school also actively participates in the annual Eastern Visayas Regional Athletic Association (EVRAA), the annual athletic event of the whole Eastern Visayas. The school joins the delegation of Leyte province. (Last 2008, the school joined the delegation of Baybay before the city lost its cityhood status and the school division was deactivated).
- The school also participates in the annual Palarong Pambansa, the athletic event of the whole Philippines. The school is part of the delegation of Eastern Visayas.

== See also ==
- Baybay
- Education in the Philippines § Secondary education
- Engineering and Science Education Program
