= Adolovni Acosta =

Filipino classical pianist (1946–2024)

- Born: 1946; Philippines
- Died: December 12, 2024 (aged 77–78) New York City, U.S.
- Occupation: Musician
- Instrument: Piano
- Years active: 1957–2024

Adolovni Acosta (1946 – December 12, 2024) was a Filipino classical pianist. She was a notable concert pianist and recitalist.

== Training and education in Manila ==
Adolovni Acosta started piano lessons at the age of nine with her musical mother Ernestina. She continued with Juliana Velázquez. At age 11, she won in a radio competition in Manila, and at age 12, she was a winner in the Lucia Francisco Music Circle Piano Scholarship Competition. After graduating from high school at age 14, she passed the college entrance examination at the University of the Philippines (UP) and entered the Conservatory of Music. At UP, she was selected to be a soloist with the UP Symphony Orchestra in "Famous Concerto Movements" and was a soloist in two commencement concerts with the same orchestra. For outstanding academic and musical achievements at UP, she was awarded university and college scholarships. She received the Teacher's Diploma in Music and the Bachelor of Music and Master of Music degrees, all in Piano. Her major teachers were Benedicta Macaisa and Regalado Jose. While a graduate student, she worked as a research aide to José Maceda at the Department of Asian Music.

== Education in the United States ==
Acosta came to the United States in 1968 as a graduate student on full assistantship that provided full tuition and monthly stipend in the World Music program of Wesleyan University in Middletown, Connecticut. A year later, she got accepted at The Juilliard School of Music in the class of Mieczyslaw Munz, and in 1971, she received the Master of Science degree in Piano. The school awarded her the John D. Rockefeller 3rd Fund scholarship. She also studied with Zenon Fishbein and Eugene List, and coached with Claude Frank and Constance Keene.

== Performing career ==
Adolovni Acosta gave her New York debut in Weill Recital Hall at Carnegie Hall in 1971, and since then has performed in 50 cities in 28 countries in North and South America, Europe, the Middle East, Asia and the Pacific and in venues such as Wigmore Hall and Purcell Halls in London, Salle Cortot in Paris, Weill Recital Hall at Carnegie Hall, Alice Tully Hall in Lincoln Center, Merkin Concert Hall, Steinway Hall and Dylan McMullen Concert Hall in New York City, Hallwylska Museet in Stockholm, Odd Fellow Palaet in Copenhagen, Der Beethoven Saal in Bonn, Yamaha Concert Hall in Vienna, Centerpointe Theatre in Ottawa, Centro Cultural Recoleta in Buenos Aires, Teatro Nacional in Brasília, Sala Carlos Chavez at UNAM in Mexico City, Thailand Cultural Center, Bangkok Goethe House, and the Cultural Center of the Philippines. She also has held recitals at Sunderland Art Gallery presented by the Sunderland Pianoforte Society and at Wolverhampton Art Gallery in England, as well as in Berlin, Hamburg, Beijing, Fuzhou, Doha, Ho Chi Minh City, Sabah, Brunei, Phnom Penh, Chiang Mai, Kuala Lumpur, Hong Kong, and across the United States. She has given recitals two times at Melba Conservatorium of Music in Melbourne, Australia, and has been performing for Philippine Embassies and Consulates in many parts of the world. She was a featured recitalist at the Philippine Embassy in Washington, D.C. as part of the Association of Southeast Asian Nations (ASEAN) presentations for Smithsonian Associates. Early on, she was selected by Jack Kahn Pianos to open their "Discovery Series" and to appear in "Boesendorfer Piano in Concert".

== Master classes ==
Adolovni Acosta has conducted master classes in addition to performing recitals at Nanyang Academy of Fine Arts in Singapore; Ho Chi Minh City Conservatory of Music in Saigon, Vietnam; the University of Canterbury Department of Music in Christchurch, New Zealand; the Monash University School of Music-Conservatorium in Melbourne, Australia; the University College Sedaya Department of Music in Kuala Lumpur; the Calcutta School of Music in India; the Kathmandu Jazz Conservatory in Nepal; the University of the Philippines College of Music and the UST Conservatory of Music in Manila; the University of Malaysia for the Kota Kinabalu Music Society in Sabah; and for Brunei Music Society.

== Recordings ==
Acosta recorded Ernesto Lecuona's Andalucia and Danzas-Afro-Cubanas for Orion Master Recordings and Piano Works of Carl Nielsen for Musical Heritage Society. In 2008, Orion Master Recordings released 'Malagueña: Piano Music from Cuba and the Philippines' on Marquis. In January 2015, Orion released on Naxos ClassicsOnline.com 'Piano Works of Carl Nielsen' that also includes live performances of three Debussy Preludes from Book 1 and Chopin Berceuse. Her performances and recordings often with live interviews have been featured on Swedish Radio in Stockholm, Brunei TV, Argentine Television Acercando Oriente and Radio Belgrano, Vietnam Television, Voice of America, National Public Radio Network, GM7 TV in Manila, and New York City radio programs.

== Death ==
Acosta died in New York City on December 12, 2024.

== Honors ==
Adolovni Acosta was a Pamana ng Pilipino awardee in the 2006 Philippine Presidential Awards for Filipino Individuals and Organizations Overseas. The awards were conferred by President Gloria Macapagal-Arroyo in a Testimonial Dinner at Malacanang Palace in Manila on December 7, 2006 where she also performed. She has participated in a concert at The White House for first lady Rosalynn Carter during an annual diplomatic corps dinner. In 1982, she was named as one of the "Ten Outstanding Young Women of America" after being selected as Outstanding Young Woman of America from New York. She was included in Good Housekeeping Magazine's "100 Young Women of Promise" in its 100th anniversary issue. Acosta is mentioned in Chronology of Western Classical Music 1751-2000 published by Routledge in 2002, and in International Who's Who in Classical Music. Early on, Acosta won first prize in a national piano competition in Manila sponsored by the Music Promotion Foundation of the Philippines.

== See also ==
- Michael Dadap
- Kuh Ledesma
- Danny Barcelona
- Gabe Baltazar
- Yo-Yo Ma
- Paula Robison
