= Crossing Bayabas National High School =

- Mataas na Paaralang Pambansa ng Crossing Bayabas
- Neptune St., Crossing Bayabas, Toril District; Davao City, Philippines

Information
- Former name: Piedad Barangay High School
- School type: Public secondary school
- Motto: "A school where every student excels."
- Established: November 22, 1997; 28 years ago
- Locale: English, Tagalog, Bisaya
- Colors: Pink, white
- Song: Tayo'y Dabawenyo; Davao City Division Hymn; Region XI Hymn; Alma Mater
- Publication: The Crossing Times, Sangandaan
- Website: @CrossingBayabasNHS

Crossing Bayabas National High School (Filipino: Mataas na Paaralang Pambansa ng Crossing Bayabas) is a public secondary school in Toril, Davao City, Davao Del Sur, Philippines, conceived on November 22, 1997, following the approval of the Republic Act No. 8388 authored by the late Congressman Elias B. Lopez.

After decades of being an annex school of Doña Carmen Denia National High School, the school finally operated on its own and paved the way for significant developments.

== History ==
=== Establishment ===
In 1967, the school was created with the name Piedad Barangay High School. The school was known to have preserving, dedicated, committed, and self-disciplined students and teachers that encouraged the community and its neighboring areas to make it their choice of preference for their children's education.

In the school year from 1979 to 1980, the school experienced much growth and development. The higher authorities of DECS decided to send a secondary school head as the administrator. At that time, the school management was implemented.

Educational and political leaders in a conference decided to look for a new school site in addition to the already crowded Piedad Barangay High School.

=== Political support ===
On 5 March 1982, Don Luis D. Denia donated a portion of his land located at the Poblacion of Toril, Davao City. By this time, there were two campuses occupied by Piedad Barangay High School:

- the old site located at Piedad, Crossing Bayabas Toril, Davao City; and
- the new site located at Toril Poblacion

=== Modification ===
On 10 September 1982, the Parent-Teacher Association (PTA) of Piedad Barangay High School approved a Resolution No. 21, series of 1982, requesting that the school's name must be changed to Doña Carmen Denia City High School due to some important justifications.

Moreover, the PTA Resolution No. 21 was unanimously approved by the 24 Board of Directors who were present at that time. The first endorsement to the Sangguniang Panglungsod was on 19 February 1983, recommending the approval of the request upon.

Additional teachers were assigned to teaching, including charity teachers, but were eventually absorbed as permanent teachers. On 11 November 1987, the change of name from Piedad Barangay High School was approved under the City Council Resolution No. 601 during the 1987-1988 school year. The Republic Act No. 6746 approved the change of the school name by Congress on August 11, 1989.

The late Honorable Congressman Elias B. Lopez was responsible for all the legal works in the acquisition and development of the school site together with political and educational leaders in the community.

The Fourth Year Curriculum with a total of 668 students with 13 sections moved to the new school site on November 19, 1985, which partly decongested the old campus. The two secondary schools were managed by one school administrator.

=== Separation ===
It was then followed by a conference called by the late Honorable Congressman Elias B. Lopez where a decision was made to separate the operation, management, and administration of the two schools. The old Piedad Barangay High School must be renamed since it is located at the Barangay of Crossing Bayabas.

Crossing Bayabas Barangay Council unanimously agreed to the proposal to change the name. The Republic Act No. 8388 approved on 22 November 1997, legalized the separation of the two schools and changed the name from Piedad Barangay High School to Crossing Bayabas National High School. The 1993-1994 school year was the turning point of the proposed separation of the two secondary schools.

== Student services and offices ==
=== Student Services Center ===
Student Services Center is composed of the Principal, guidance counselor, guidance coordinators, teachers, parents, students, peer counselors and stakeholders who are actively involved in giving services pertaining to the physical, mental, emotional, and spiritual development of the students. It also provides services like prevention from unfavorable effects of environmental influence and remediation of problems encountered by individual/group of students in school, among others.

=== Services Rendered ===
- Individual Inventory
- Testing Services
- Information
- Individual Counseling
- Group counseling
- Follow-up Mechanism
- Career Guidance Services
- Records Section
- Referral Services
- Spiritual Services
- Prevention and Wellness

=== Offices ===
- School Clinic
- Teen Center
- Reading Center
- School Canteen
- Computer Laboratory
- School’s Publication Office
- Supreme Student Government (SSG) Office
- Disaster Risk Reduction and Management (DRRM) Office

== Clubs and organizations ==
Students are encouraged to join a club or organizations in school.

=== Junior High School clubs ===
The following list are the Junior High School clubs.

- Supreme Secondary Learner Government (SSLG) is the highest governing body of the entire student body, which promotes mutual understanding through social, civic, intellectual, recreational and scientific programs and activities.
- English Club is a group which aims to provide activities that will enhance the skills and abilities of the students in English, thus making them ready to face the competitive world of communication.
- Math Wizard is an organization composed of students with interest in math. The main objective of the organization is to encourage the students to study and appreciate mathematics. It also provides them opportunities to apply and improve their skills in mathematics by participating in several math-related competitions.
- Science Club is a student organization of enthusiasts organized to implement or facilitate activities that promote love for Science and the passion for undertaking investigatory projects among students.
- Likhang Filipino Club
- Mag-aaral Sa Araling Panlipunan (MASAP)
- Young Entrepreneur and Cooperativism in Schools (YECS) is the co-curricular organization of the Department of Education in Technology and Livelihood Education (TLE) which provides students with practical experiences, technical know-how, and opportunities to be oriented in Home Economics, Agricultural Technology, Industrial Arts, Entrepreneurship, and ICT Integration while developing their leadership abilities and personal skills, and building wholesome character to strengthen national competitiveness and productivity.
- Arts Club, Crossers Dance Troupe, Singing Teens, and Drum and Bugle (MAPEH Club) primarily have a goal to foster opportunities for the development of talents and skills in music, art, physical education, and health.
- Values Club, Eco Crossers, and Barkada Konta Droga (BKD)
- Youth for Environment in School’s Organization (YES-O) is a school-based co-curricular organization which serves as a venue for students’ actions and movements toward safeguarding, protecting and conserving the environment for future generations.
- School publications: Crossing Times (English) and Sangandaan (Filipino) are the official school papers. They serve as the voice of the students and chronicle the development and progress of the school and the community.
- Girl Scouts of the Philippines is a school-based unit which promotes girl scouting and its ideals as expressed in exemplary leadership, citizenship, and community involvement of its members.
- Boy Scouts of the Philippines is a school-based BSP unit which composed of boy scouts who are trained to live by the ideals of boy scouting such as leadership, responsibility, and nation-building.
- Crossers Outreach Program is a community extension program of the school organized by the teachers and the students for them to participate constructively in helping solve local community problems.
- Peer Facilitator’s Organization (PEFAO) and Peer Educator’s Organization are the gateway for students to be of assistance to their peers in addressing emotional, psychological, social, physical, and mental aspects, and most especially for Reproductive Health concerns by conducting in-take interviews and making referrals. These students have undergone training facilitated by the City Government, Department of Health, etc.

=== Senior High School clubs ===
Senior high school clubs include the following. Students may choose from among these organizations to harness their potential in their field of specialization.

1. League of Amateur Business Minds
2. Lovers for Arts and Society
3. Young Fashionistas
4. Future Home Makers (FHM)
5. Council of united Talented Electrical Students (CUTES)

== School programs and policies ==
- Modified Work and Study Program (MWSP)
- Special Program in Sports (SPS)
- Special Education Program (SPED)
- Special Program in the Arts (SPA)
- Special Program in Science, Technology, Engineering, and Mathematics (SPSTEM)
- Effective Alternative Secondary Education (EASE), also called Drop-out Reduction Program (DORP)
- Basura Ko, Sagot Ko of RA. 9003 (Ecological Solid Waste Management Act of 2000)
- DepEd Child Protection Policy (DO 40, s. 2012)
- Anti-Bullying Policy (RA. 10627, Anti-Bullying Act of 2013)
- Article IV, Provisions of the Supreme Student Government in Secondary Schools, (DO 47, s. 2014)

== Notable personalities ==
- Maymay Entrata (2011 alumni, SSG Vice President, School Publications Contributor)
- Jona Soquite (2020 alumni)
