= Naga City Science High School =

Public high school in Camarines Sur, Philippines

Location
- Balatas, Naga City; City of Naga; Philippines; 13°37′42″N 123°12′19″E

Information
- Motto: Service For God and Man
- Established: 1994
- Principal: Baby Ruby P. Luarente
- Grades: 7 to 12
- Enrollment: approx. 1000
- Language: English, Filipino, Bikol
- Campus: 1 hectare
- Color: Blue
- Nickname: Sayans, City Sci,
- Publication: 'The Naguenian' (English) 'Ang Naguenian' (Filipino)
- Affiliations: Division of City Schools - Naga
- Website: http://www.nagasci.edu.ph/

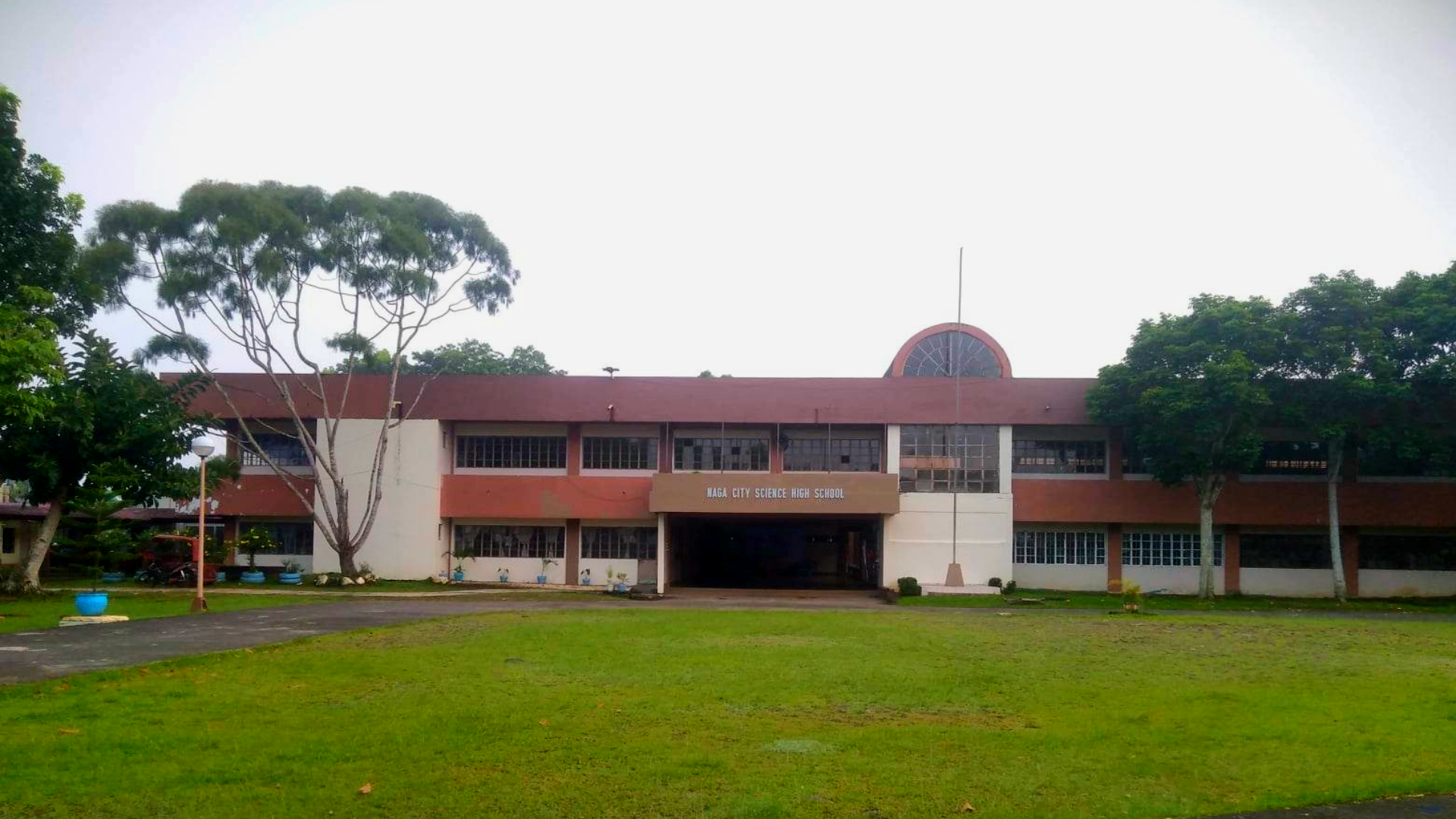
Naga City Science High School Main Building

The Naga City Science High School is a secondary public science high school system located in Leon SA Aureus St., Gimenez Park Subdivision, Balatas, Naga City, Camarines Sur, Philippines. It is a DepEd-recognized Science High School. The principal is Baby Ruby F. Laurente.

== Admission ==
The requirements for applying for the NCSHS Entrance Exam for freshmen are:

- 85% in at least Mathematics, English and Science.
- Not lower than 83% in the other subjects.
- Authenticated Form 143 copy with second grading weighted average of 85% or above.

== History ==
Naga City Science High School came into being in accordance with the requirements in DECS Order Nos. 5, s. 1989, 19-a,s.1994 and 69, s.1993, to provide for a secondary education program with special reference to science. The department initiated the establishment of Science High Schools among public high schools, in coordination with the Department of Science and Technology (DOST). The establishment of the school was also in response to the urgent need in the division to establish a science high school that will continue the development of intellectually advanced children that project SMART started. Thus, under Resolution No. 94-030, members of the 4th Sangguniang Panlunsod approved in 1994 that the City Mayor Seb Rey R. Javier, be authorized to negotiate with the DECS and DOST for the establishment of a science high school in the City of Naga.

The school started in 1994 with 68 students in two classes – namely, I- Mars with 35 students and I- Pluto with 33. An additional two classes were added for school year 1995–1996 with 133.5 students and one more additional class for school year 1996–1997 with 175.5 students.

The first batch of teachers hired were Alicia C. Naag, who handled Science I and PEHM I; Sonia D. Teran, English and Speech; Victoria C. Israel, Math and THE; Anita Villaraza, Filipino, Social Studies, and Values Education; and Mike Chloe Rey M. Barrameda, who handled Spanish. During its first year, the school occupied two rooms in the SS Building of Camarines Sur National High School. Teachers and other personnel were also provided since the newly opened school did not have its own staff. The Science and Math I Supervisor, Dr. Lydia A. Templonuevo, was the immediate officer-in-charge who managed and supervised the school until December 1994.

Naga City Science High School has an enriched Science, Mathematics, and English curriculum, in addition to the standard requirements of the New Secondary Education Curriculum (NSEC). While the NSEC requires a minimum of ten periods (6 2/3 hrs) for each of the four curricula, the school has increased the minimum to 11 periods (7 1/3 hrs) for the first and second years and to 12 periods (8 hrs) for the third and fourth years, which are roughly similar to content time required for existing science high schools. An entrance examination is given to elementary school pupils who placed in the highest 10% in the regional NEAT and who have been recommended by the principals. The school also adheres to its "retention policy" – to be retained, students should maintain an overall weighted average of at least 85%.

Teachers are selected on the basis of DECS order 69,s.1993 (Sec.5) known as "Selective Teacher-Hiring Procedure". It states that teachers who will be hired should be superior graduates of teacher education institutions or should have scored well in PBET and in divisional rankings. After 3 years of being lent a temporary space, the school finally has its own campus at Gimenez Park Subdivision, Magsaysay Ave., Naga City.

== International Participation ==
- 13th SEAMEO Young Scientists Congress - Penang, Malaysia (10-14 June 2024)
