= General Pio del Pilar National High School =

Location
- Makati, Metro Manila; Philippines
- 14.564908°N 121.034125°E

Information
- Former names: Pio del Pilar Educational Institution; Makati High School-Pio del Pilar Annex
- Motto: Home of Persevering, Industrious and Obedient Students
- Established: June 28, 2002
- Local authority: School Division Office - Makati
- Educational authority: Department of Education
- Principal: Juliet H. Melo
- Grades: 7 - 10
- Language: Filipino, English
- Song: Gen. Pio del Pilar National High School Hymn
- Budget: ₱52,912,000
- Website: http://genpiodelpilarnhs.edu.ph

General Pio del Pilar National High School (abbreviated as: GPDPNHS, filipino: Mataas na Paaralang Pambansa ng Heneral Pio del Pilar, informal: Pio) is a Public Secondary School located in Osias St., Barangay Poblacion, Makati. It follows the newly-enforced MATATAG curriculum set by the Department of Education for its Grade 7 students while offering the K-12 Curriculum for Grade 8 - 10.

== Etymology ==
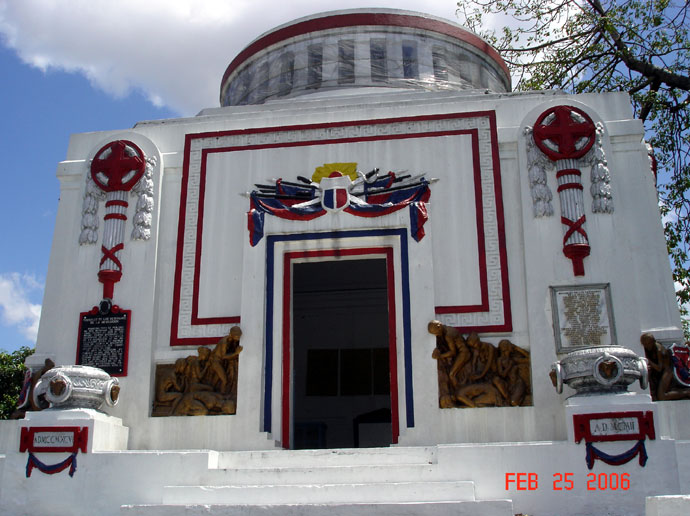
Pio del Pilar's tomb is located at the Mausoleo de los Veteranos de la Revolución (Mausoleum of the Revolutionary Veterans) in the Manila North Cemetery.

The school was named after General Pio del Pilar, a local hero of Makati during the revolutionary period in 1896 - 1898. Embittered by Jose Rizal's unjust arrest, he joined the Katipunan in May 1896 and formed a chapter called Matagumpay, taking the symbolic name Pang-una. As secretary of Magtagumpay, the Makati chapter Pio led about a thousand men in the latter stage of the Battle of San Juan del Monte in August 1896. They took part in the barely remembered battles fought under Andres Bonifacio around what is now Metro Manila, and the subsequent move to Cavite under Emilio Aguinaldo. He was appointed the army corps commander by Andres Bonifacio and when the Supremo died, he joined Gen. Emilio Aguinaldo's forces and became one of his trusted generals.

== History ==
Founded by the former Senator Jovito Salonga in 1947, Pio del Pilar Education Institution pioneered the journey not only in the field of private education but also high school education, being the first private high school in Makati. Its first location was in Jose Rizal Avenue cor. Escuela St. until it relocated in 1971 at F. Zobel St. cor. Morong St., both in Barangay Poblacion. PDEI's existence lasted until 1999 until it was bought by the School Board of the City Government of Makati.

After being purchased, the former Pamantasan ng Makati - Science and Technology High School (PNM - STHS) teachers was transferred under the supervision of the Department of Education - Schools Division of Makati to the now-called "Makati High School – Pio Del Pilar Annex (MHS – PDP)" under the leadership of Ms. Ma. Corazon L. Jose as the Principal in June 2001.

The annexation of MHS - PDP became the transition period towards its eventual independence thus becoming the now-known General Pio del Pilar National High School on June 28, 2002 via the City ordinance no.99-078 providing quality education for its constituents.

== Campus ==
=== Old Building ===
Old General Pio del Pilar Highschool Building

The old building was originally built on 1971 located on F. Zobel St. cor. Morong St., Barangay Poblacion, Makati City and was originally used by the Pio del Pilar Educational Institution before being purchased by the SDO of Makati to become the new home of MHS-PDP and GPDPNHS. Nowadays, the old building is being re-use as an office of COMELEC along the vicinity of the Makati City Hall.

=== New Building ===
On May 2, 2014, Makati Science High School transferred to the controversial 10-story building on Kalayaan Avenue, Cembo, Taguig City (formerly Makati). After the transition, the General Pio del Pilar National High School took over the 4-story building.

== Academical Programs ==
=== K-12 Curriculum ===
The General Pio del Pilar National Highschool follows the K-12 curriculum mandated by the Department of Education. The program aims to provide a sufficient time for mastery of concepts and skills, develop lifelong learners, and prepare graduates for tertiary education, employment and entrepreneurship. The curriculum includes 5 core subjects and 3 additional subjects for an enhanced, context-based and spiral-progression learning curriculum.

- Filipino
- English
- Mathematics
- Science
- Social Studies
- Values
- MAPEH
- Technology and Livelihood Education

In a Facebook post, the school administration commented that the Secondary School does not offer Senior High School programs.

=== MATATAG Curriculum ===
The curriculum will be implemented in phases for a smooth transition from the old K-12 Curriculum to the newer MATATAG Curriculum. The MATATAG or K to 10 Curriculums puts great emphasis on five important skills:

- Language
- Reading and Literacy
- Mathematics
- Makabansa
- Good Manners and Right Conduct (GRMC)

=== Special Education (SPED) ===
The school is the sole accredited public SPED secondary school in Makati City. Special Education ensures the inclusion of Learners with Special Educational Needs into the school system by providing adequate and appropriate support mechanisms and accommodations that would cater to their unique conditions and needs. The program establish that all students have an opportunity to learn and grow in a safe and supportive environment.

=== Science, Technology and Education (STE) Program ===
On June 18, 2024, the school announces through Facebook its very first STE program for the School Year 2024 - 2025. The program requires an Admission Test for incoming Grade 7 learners and shall follow the requirements set by the school's administration.

== See also ==
- Pio del Pilar
