= Ramon Magsaysay (Cubao) High School =

Public high school in Quezon City, Philippines

- Mataas na Paaralan ng Ramon Magsaysay (Cubao) (Filipino)

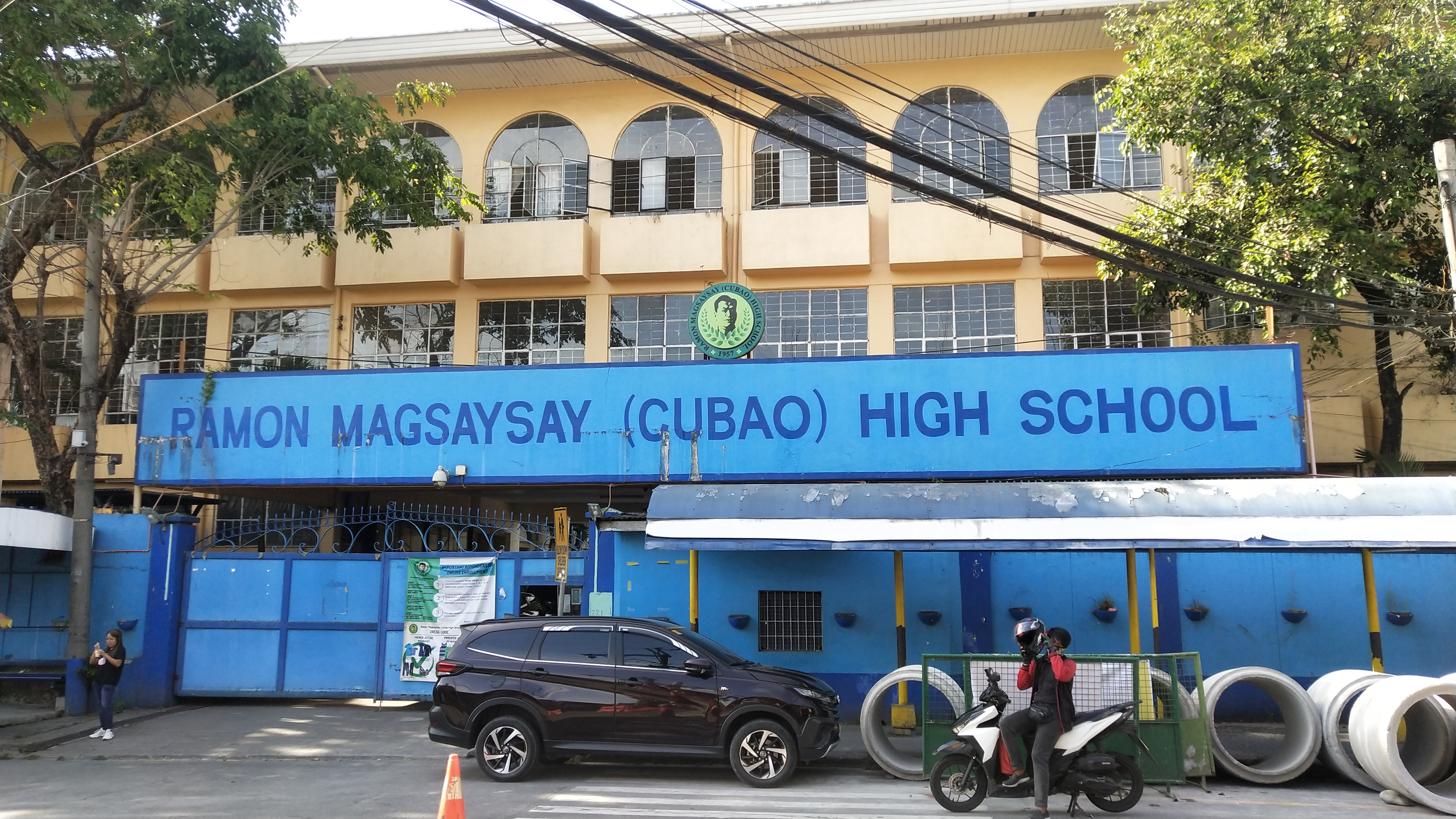
- Facade of the RMCHS Main Building, 2021

Location
- 31 Ermin Garcia St., cor. Epifanio de los Santos Avenue, Cubao; Quezon City, Metro Manila 1111; Philippines; 14°37′38″N 121°2′47″E

Information
- Type: Public, Special Science
- Motto: Soar High, Monsay!, Basta Monsay, Mahusay! ("Whatever Monsay touches, turns out great!")
- Established: 1953; 73 years ago (as Quezon City High School: Cubao Annex); 1956; 70 years ago (as Cubao High School); 1965; 61 years ago (as Ramon Magsaysay (Cubao) High School)
- School number: 305358
- Principal: Dr. Josehpine M. Maningas
- Faculty: Approx. 220
- Grades: 7 to 10 (junior high school); 11 to 12 (senior high school)
- Enrollment: 4,282 (as of SY 2020 - 2021); Approx. 4,000 - 7,000; referred to as "Ramonians" or "Taga-Monsay" (from Monsay)
- Language: English, Filipino, Mandarin Chinese (for Foreign Language Service Curriculum)
- Campus: Urban
- Student Union/Association: RMCHS Supreme Secondary Learner Government (SSLG) under Ma. Cecilia M. Velasco; RMCHS Campus Integrity Crusaders (CIC) under Rosa Belle Bon; RMCHS Learner Government Commission on Elections and Appointments (LG COMEA) under Mike Regner J. Lagahuya
- Colors: Illuminating Emerald and Whiteout (for basic education curriculum) Jasper and Whiteout (for Engineering and Science Education Program) Dark Slate Gray and Whiteout (for senior high school curriculum)
- Song: RMCHS Hymn
- Nickname: RM, RMCHS, Ramon, Monsay, Monching, Team Monsay (sports nickname)
- Publication: The Apprentice (English) under Abigail A. Driz ⸸ Ang Tanglaw (Tagalog) under Evangeline S. Gagarin
- Yearbook: The Apprentice: Commencement Issue
- Affiliations: Division of City Schools - Quezon City, Department of Education; DOST
- Website: www.facebook.com/Ramon-Magsaysay-Cubao-High-School-JHSH-102237024848765
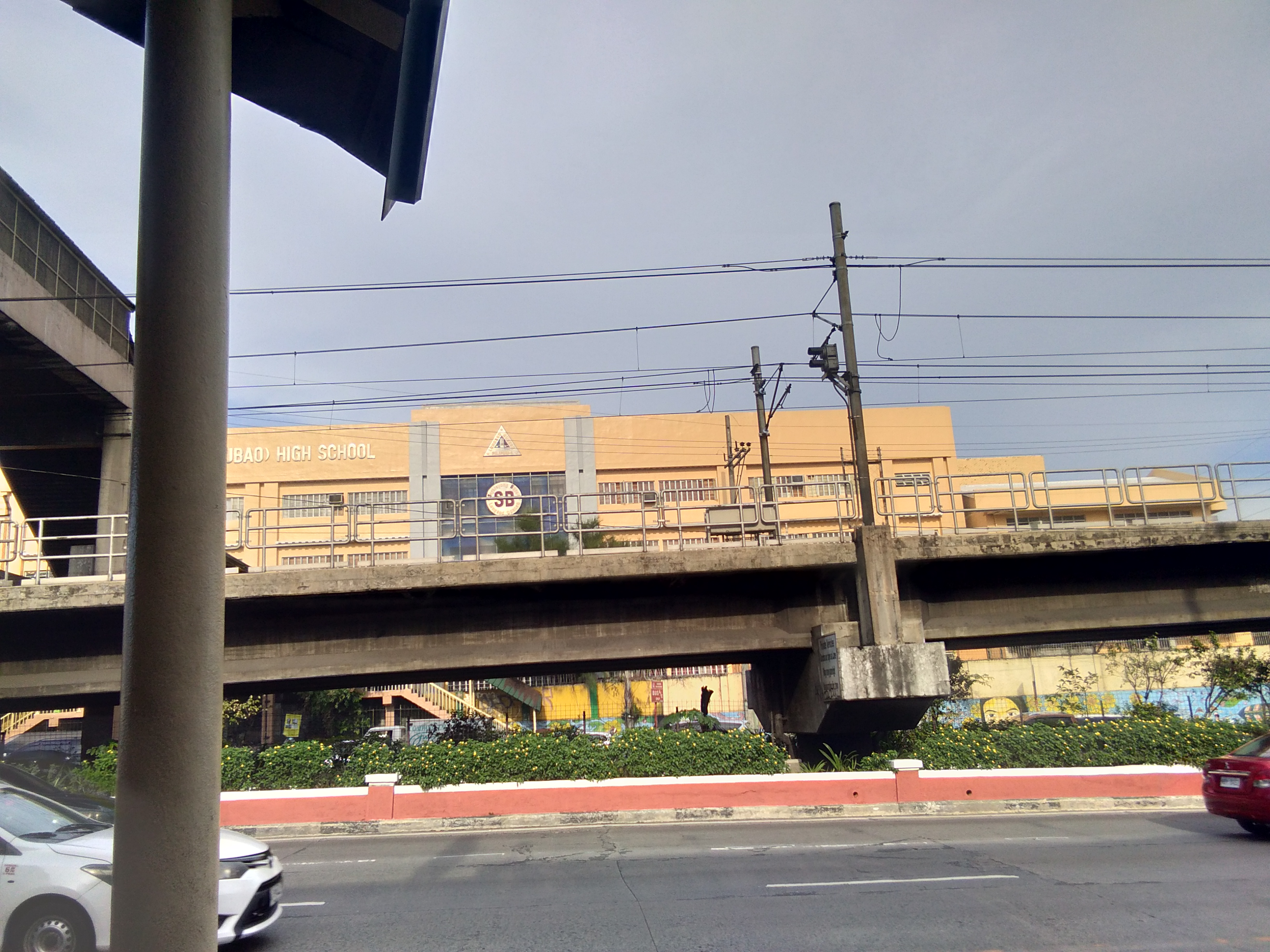
- View of RMCHS New Sonny Belmonte Building from Mega Q-Mart, 2021.

Ramon Magsaysay (Cubao) High School (RMCHS), also referred to by its colloquial portmanteau Monsay or Monching (as homage to one of Ramon Magsaysay's nicknames), is a public high school in Quezon City, Philippines. It was founded as an annex of Quezon City High School (QCHS) in 1953 then became an independent school in 1958. It is one of the two schools in Metro Manila named after President Ramon Magsaysay (the other being Ramon Magsaysay High School, Manila).

== History ==
The school was established as an annex of Quezon City High School (QCHS) in 1953. The school was located at Epifanio de los Santos Avenue (EDSA), near Cubao Elementary School. As a new school, it needed temporary housing for its academe, which happened in 1958 when it was housed in a building at the corner of Aurora Boulevard, and Fanny Enriquez was then named as the school's first principal and was named as this the independent Cubao High School. After one academic year, the school again relocated in 1960 to New Orleans Street, behind the old Quezon City Hall. Due to accelerating socio-economic development in Quezon City, Cubao High School annexes began sprouting. The first of these was the Murphy Annex, which started operations in 1961. This annex was named Juan Sumulong High School (JSHS) upon being designated an independent school in 1964. The second annex became Carlos P. Garcia High School (CPGHS) which became independent in 1972, while the third became Ponciano Bernardo High School (PBHS) which became independent in 1968.

On March 17, 1965, Cubao High School was renamed in memory of President Ramon Magsaysay who perished in a plane crash on March 17, 1957, which was attended by Magsaysay's widow, Luz-Banzon Magsaysay. In 1964, while the school was still known as Cubao High School, composer Jerry Amper Dadap, who taught music and rondalla at the school, composed the school's CHS Hymn, whose music continues to be used in the present-day RMCHS Hymn, with the initials changed from "CHS" to "RMCHS" in the lyrics. Consequently, this marked March 17 of every year as the school's Foundation Day. The school year 1968-1969 saw a record boom in enrollment, resulting in the lack of accommodations for more than 81,000 students. To remedy the situation, the old Quezon City Hall, standing on prime land at the corner of EDSA and Minnesota Street (now Ermin Garcia Streer), was appropriated as the permanent school site. The school began offering summer school in 1977. Unfortunately, on March 15, 1981, a devastating fire gutted the entire school building, burning most of the school's records. The school year (SY) for 1981-1982 was spent at the nearby Raval Building, which was rented by the city government to enable students to continue their schooling.

Through the initiative of former First Lady and then Metro Manila Governor Imelda Marcos and then city Mayor Adelina S. Rodriguez, construction of a ₱13.6 million school building began in 1982. The three-story building was inaugurated on September 8 of the same year. Through the Department of Education, Culture and Sports (DECS) initiative, a two-story Secondary Education Development Program (SEDP) building was constructed. To cope with the demand for more classrooms, the city government vacated the adjacent Post Office to give way to the construction of a new school building sponsored by then-Congressman Sonny Belmonte in 1997.

In 1998, a fourth building was constructed beside the SEDP building to house the laboratory classes of the students. It was called the DOST Building, named after the Department of Science and Technology, which sponsored the building of the facility. Three more buildings were added to the school's compound to house the technical and home economics subjects, as well as the science curriculum students of the school, namely the Home Economics Building in 1998, the Mathay Building in 2000, and the Technology Building in 2003.

In 2007, the SEDP building was demolished to make way for the construction of a four-storey building named the New Sonny Belmonte Building. This new building now serves as the house for computer units and laboratory equipment for the Junior High School (JHS) students, with the Mathay Building being the house for the computer units and laboratory equipment of the Senior High School (SHS) students, in response to the country's shift to the K-12 curriculum.

In 2013, the school's Foundation Day was moved to August 31, President Magsaysay's birthdate, then it was moved back again in 2015 to March 17, Magsaysay's death. However, a fire devoured the school's canteen in the main building on June 6, 2015.

From 2020 to 2021, two school markers were constructed in the Main Building and in the Mathay Building to make the school's environment more engaging, along with the introduction of the renaming of the school's chess club into the GM Eugene Torre Chess Center, named after alumnus Eugene Torre. On the school's 65th Foundation Day, a life-sized statue of Ramon Magsaysay was unveiled on the school's grounds which the RMCHSAAI sponsored, the school's incorporated alumni association. This statue project was made to complement the bust of Ramon Magsaysay that is adjacent to the said statue.

== Curricula ==
Ramon Magsaysay (Cubao) High School, as with other Public Schools in the Philippines, follows the Basic Education Curriculum as prescribed by the Department of Education. In 1994, President Fidel V. Ramos introduced the Engineering and Science Education Program (ESEP) in some selected public schools in the Philippines; and the Ramon Magsaysay (Cubao) High School was one of those who were selected. The ESEP Curriculum revised its predecessor, the Science and Technology Education Program (STEP), which was then formulated by the Department of Education, Culture, and Sports. In 2013, the ESEP Curriculum was then changed to Science, Technology, Engineering, and Mathematics (STEM) Curriculum, in lieu of the Government's Revision of the old Education Curriculum; changing from the Basic Education Curriculum (BEC) to the K-12 Education Curriculum.

There are other Curricula offered by the school such as the following:

- Special Needs Education Curriculum (SNED) - A high school program that serves as an entry point for students with special needs to have their high school education in a public school. It is one of the only public schools in Quezon City to accept special education learning at the secondary level.
- Foreign Language Service Curriculum (Chinese - Mandarin) - A program that is mandated both by the TLE and the English department, where students in the junior high school program can opt out to have this as one of their taken subjects.
- Alternative Learning System (ALS) - Formerly known as Alternative Delivery Mode (ADM), this is a program for reaching out to out-of-school youth and for adults who want to earn a high school diploma.
- Special Program for the Arts (SPA) - A recently opened special program for talented students in the arts, introduced in 2021 and has set upon a call for future students after a successful year.

== Notable alumni ==
=== Sports ===
The following people below are the list of alumni from the school that became part of the athletic representation of the Philippines, locally and internationally.

- Eugenio Torre (HS '68) - chess grandmaster
- Ramar Aguirre Acuña (HS '08) - freediving athlete
- Claudine Veloso (JHS '17) - kickboxing athlete

=== Arts, media, and entertainment ===
The following people below are the list of alumni from the school that became part of the various arts, media, and entertainment hubs in the Philippines.

- Reuel Molina Aguila (HS '70) - playwright
- Erin Ocampo - actress and entrepreneur
- Josiah Antonio (HS '14) - news writer, ABS-CBN News
- Larah Grace Lacap (HS '10) - top 15 finalist of Binibining Pilipinas 2017 and entrepreneur

=== Sciences ===
The following people below are the list of alumni from the school that became part of the scientific community in various fields.

- Engr. Izrael Zenar Bautista - BIRDS-4 project manager for Maya-2

=== Government ===
The following people below are the list of alumni from the school that became part of the branches of government of the Philippines.

- Normandie Pizarro (HS '65) - associate justice of Court of Appeals of the Philippines
- Joseph S. Tan - former mayor of Santiago, Isabela

=== Military ===
The following people below are the list of alumni from the school that became part of the Philippine Army.

- Angelo Reyes (HS '60) - former AFP Chief-of-Staff and cabinet secretary under President Gloria Macapagal Arroyo

=== Business ===
The following people below are the list of alumni from the school that made big names in their respective industries.

- Robert G. Hombre (HS '69) - Founding Chair of Q Art Circle, Philippines and CEO at Q Art Feelimism, International; Marketing Director at Salinlahi Art Network
- Jason Robert L. Mendoza (HS '15) - Former RMCHS Gaslighter; Senior Manager, Central Financial Accounting Department at Philippine Veterans Bank
