= Sunderland Art Gallery =

Coordinates: 54.90389°N 1.3801°W

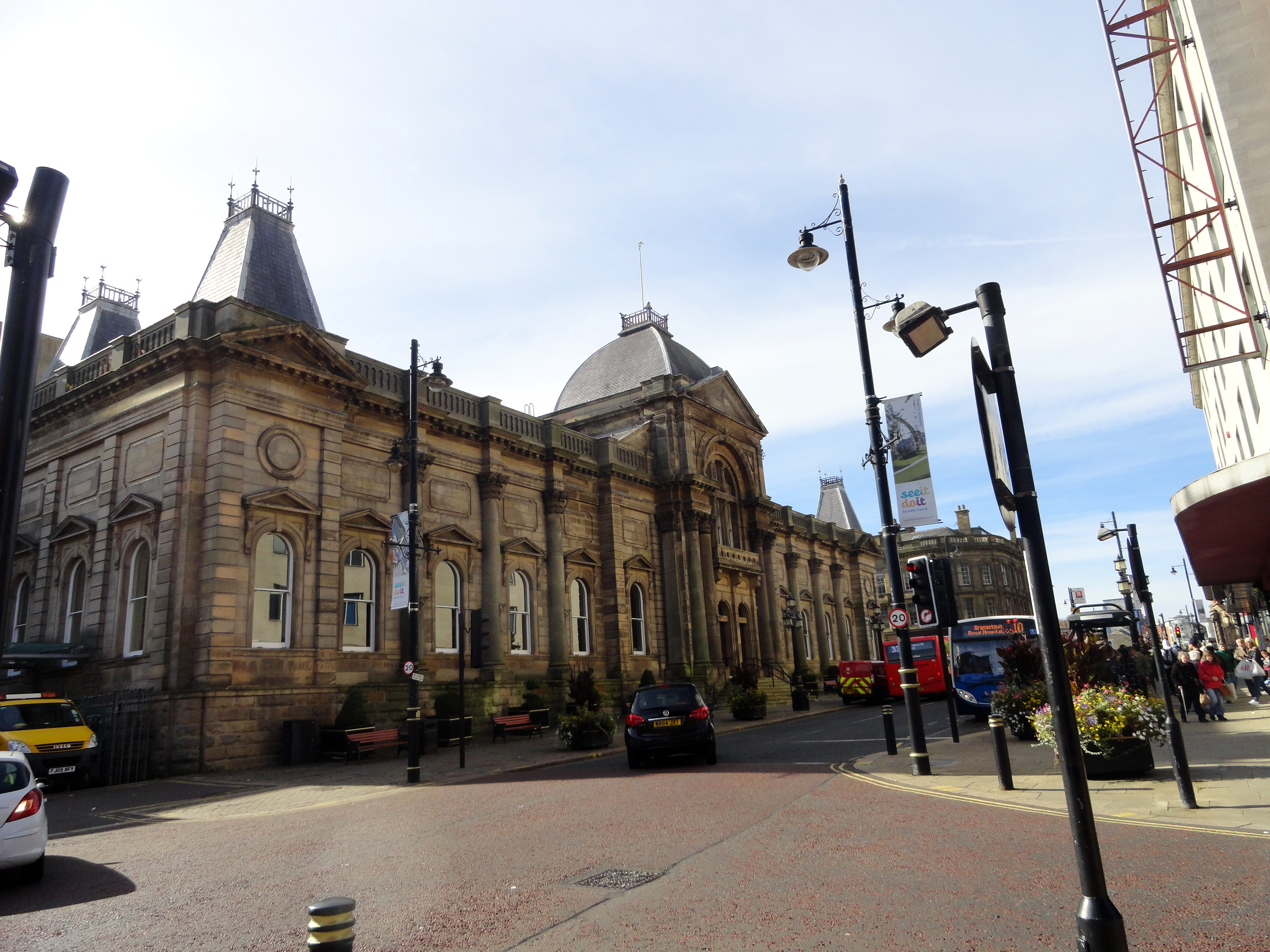
Sunderland Museum building (October 2016)

The Sunderland Art Gallery is an art gallery based within the Sunderland Museum and Winter Gardens centre, in Sunderland City Centre.

The collection of paintings includes works by the British artist, L.S. Lowry, many with local significance. For example, River Wear at Sunderland (1961) and Girl in a Red Hat on a Promenade (1972) – an enigmatic piece composed at Seaburn.
