= One Oclarit =

- Born: Onecimo Oclarit; 1951 (age 74–75)
- Genres: church hymns
- Occupations: lyricist, pianist, composer and hymnist
- Instrument: piano

One Oclarit (born Onecimo Oclarit in 1951), usually known as One, is a blind Filipino lyricist, pianist, composer and hymnist best known for his Cebuano Christian hymns.

To this day, the vast majority of Visayan hymnals contain his work. Boholano churchgoers are familiar with "Sulod Kamo Nga Malipayon," "Ania Kita Nagsaulog," "Dayegon Ta Ang Ginoo," "Ania Kami Ginoo" and "Dawata O Ginoo," used before the start of the mass. Other songs by One are "Ang Tawo Mamatay Gayud," "Bisan Pa Man," "Kanunay Buhi ang Kinabuhi," "Pamatia O Ginoo" and "Tawo Ayaw Kalimot sa Abog ka Gikan", sung during requiem mass.

His composition "Señor San Jose" is sung anywhere in the world where there are Visayan devotees of Saint Joseph.

== History ==
One has been blind since 1957, when as a six-year-old he contracted typhoid fever.

He worked at the St. Joseph Cathedral in Tagbilaran City, Bohol, Philippines, which helped him to regain his faith to the Lord and confidence in himself. He was a bell ringer from age 12 to 14 before he became the official organist.

He is married to Trinidad, with whom he has three children, Rosauro Mariano, Ma. Luisa and Ma. Alma. He has 10 grandchildren.

== Awards ==
- He won the 1994 Grand Original Composition for the song "Balik sa Bohol" which is popularized by local singers in Loboc in the Loboc River floating restos.
- He also won the 12th Cebu Pop Music in 1994 for the song "Kay Gihigugma Ko Ikaw."
- He wrote the jingles of CBB and Ubi Festival.
- He won first place in for Panag-higalaay sa Loay.

== Sources ==
- http://www.pia.gov.ph/?m=12&fi=p080814.htm&no=55
- http://www.boholsundaypost.net/2009/feb/1/roundbohol5.htm
- http://www.boholchronicle.com/2008/oct/18/front1.htm
- http://www.boholchronicle.com/2008/nov/2/bared.htm
