= Children's Orchestra Society =

US non-profit organization

The Children's Orchestra Society's logo

The Children's Orchestra Society (COS) is a non-profit organization in New York City founded by Dr. Hiao Tsiun Ma for musically talented children and teens.

== Purpose ==
Founded in 1962, the organization is dedicated to teaching children and to presenting young musicians to well-established artists through orchestra and chamber music presentations. It is under the leadership of executive director Dr. Yeou-Cheng Ma and music director Michael Dadap since 1984. Students range from those in early childhood through high school graduates. COS grew from 18 members to more than 200 student members. It is composed of four orchestras, a chamber music department, musicianship classes, and offers private lessons in piano, guitar, and all orchestral instruments. Its advanced orchestra, the Young Symphonic Ensemble, has presented concerts at Lincoln Center's Alice Tully Hall annually since the establishment of the Discovery Concert Series in 1994. Some of COS's past guest artists include: Emanuel Ax, Sarah Chang, Jaime Laredo, Cecile Licad, Yo-Yo Ma, Paula Robison, David Shifrin, and Cho-Liang Lin. The Young Symphonic Ensemble (YSE) had also toured in numerous cities in North America, the Far East, and the United Kingdom, including performances in Scotland, the Philippines, Taiwan, and Toronto. COS members perform in orchestral and chamber music concerts. In 2007, COS made its Carnegie Hall Debut with guest artists Jaime Laredo and Sharon Robinson. The organization strives to involve members with their communities through performances for civic and cultural groups. The New York Times has reviewed several of its performances.

== Mission and philosophy ==
In addition to being a non-profit and an educationally-inclined organization for children, the Children's Orchestra Society also has the mission to cultivate and nurture children.

== Membership ==
The Children's Orchestra Society is committed to keeping its programs accessible to the broadest range of families. Acceptance to COS is based on auditions. The audition process is very thorough. The organization accepts students of various levels and offers a wide range of programs suitable for students from beginners to the most gifted. Membership fees are kept below the actual costs of the organization's operation, and scholarships are available for exceptional young musicians who require financial assistance.

== See also ==
- Yo-Yo Ma
- Cecile Licad
- Jaime Laredo
- China Institute in America
- Mary Howell Memorial Scholarship
