= Alfredo Buenaventura =

Filipino composer (born 1929)

- Born: Alfredo Santos Buenaventura; October 14, 1929 (age 96); Santa Maria, Bulacan, Philippine Islands
- Occupations: Filipino composer, conductor, pianist, educator
- Awards: Order of National Artists of the Philippines, Music (2026)

Alfredo Santos Buenaventura is a Filipino composer, conductor and educator. He is a National Artist of the Philippines for Music

== Early life and education ==
Alfredo Santos Buenaventura was born in October 14, 1929 in Santa Maria, Bulacan. He graduated from the University of Santo Tomas in 1951.

== Career ==
Buenaventura has composed over 1,000 works, in different forms such as operas, choral works and chamber music. His work also helped re-popularize the rondalla and also incorporates Philippine indigenous elements such as with the opera Princess Urduja.

Among Buenaventura's other known works are Bayan Kong Mahal, Mabuhay March, Maria Makiling, and Kayumanggi Symphony. He received the Republic Cultural Heritage Award in 1964 for Maria Makiling (1961) and again in 1972 for Kayumanggi Symphony.

He collaborated with the Manila Symphony Orchestra, the Philharmonic Orchestra, the Rizal Park Orchestra, and the Armed Forces of the Philippines Band.

He also taught music at the conservatories of the Philippine Women's University, St. Scholastica's College and Centro Escolar University, where he served as the Dean of Music.

On September 10, 2026, Alfredo Buenaventura was proclaimed as one of the ten new National Artists of the Philippines.
