= Ramon Santos =

Filipino composer and ethnomusicologist (born 1941)

Ramon Pagayon Santos
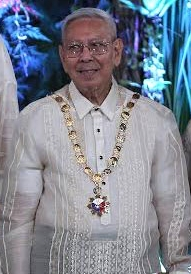
- Santos in 2016
- Born: Ramón Santos; 25 February 1941 (age 85); Pasig, Rizal, Commonwealth of the Philippines
- Occupations: composition; musicologist; ethnomusicologist
- Era: Contemporary
- Known for: Chevalier de l'Ordre des Arts et Lettres, 1987; Order of National Artists of the Philippines, 2014

Ramón Pagayon Santos (born 25 February 1941) is a Filipino composer, ethnomusicologist, and educator known for being the Philippines' foremost living exponent of contemporary Filipino classical music, for work that expounds on "the aesthetic frameworks of Philippine and Southeast Asian artistic traditions," and for finding new uses of indigenous Philippine instruments. A University Professor Emeritus of the composition and theory department at the College of Music of the University of the Philippines Diliman, he was proclaimed National Artist of the Philippines for music in 2014.

== Work as ethnomusicologist ==
In 1976, Santos began doing fieldwork among folk religious groups in Quezon, collecting and documenting their music. He later also did similar fieldwork among the Ibaloi, Mansaka, Bontoc, Yakan and Boholano peoples. The Philippines' National Commission on Culture and the Arts notes that as a result, Santos' compositions beginning in this period in his professional life were characterized by "the translation of indigenous musical systems into modern musical discourse."

== Compositions ==
Some of Santos' compositions include:

- Rituwal ng Pasasalamat
- Likas-An
- Badiw as Kapoonan
- Awit ni Pulau
- Daragang Magayon
- Ta-O
- Sandiwaan
- Nagnit Igak G’nan Wagnwag Nila (Alingawngaw ng Kagitingan)
- Gong-An for solo piano (I. Klntang, II. About-Tanaw III, III. Pal'ok)
- L'bad for orchestra
- Panaghoy

== Recognition ==
Santos was made a Chevalier de l'Ordre des Arts et Lettres in 1987.

He was one of six people added to the roster of National Artists of the Philippines in 2014.

He received a master in music from Indiana University in 1969 and PhD in Music Composition from the State University of New York at Buffalo in 1972.

== See also ==
- José Maceda
- Lucrecia Kasilag
