= Michael Dadap =

Michael Amper Dadap
- Born: May 19, 1944 (age 82); Hinunangan, Leyte, Commonwealth of the Philippines
- Genres: Philippine Folk Music
- Occupations: Guitarist, composer, conductor
- Instrument: Guitar
- Years active: 1971-present
- Website: www.childrensorch.org

Michael Amper Dadap is a popular Filipino-American guitarist, composer, and conductor, and an influential advocate of Filipino folk music. He was influential in the creation of a world-class rondalla ensemble in the United States is also the founding music director of the rondalla ensemble of Iskwelahang Pilipino based in Boston, Massachusetts.

== Early life and training ==
Dadap was born in Barangay Bangcas B Hinunangan, Southern Leyte, on May 19,1944, into a family of musicians, one of the 14 children of Dionesia Amper and Vedasto Dadap. He is the younger brother of Filipino nationalist composer Jerry Amper Dadap. His first exposure to music was at a local Protestant church, where he grew up with the hymns of Handel, Mozart and Beethoven. He earned his bachelor's degree in 1964 from the University of the Philippines, majoring in conduction. In 1971, he went to study composition and conducting at the Mannes College of Music in New York City and three years later made his debut performance at Carnegie Recital Hall. He also toured as a musical performer in other parts of the United States, Europe and the Far East.

== Career ==
Since 1984, Dadap has been the artistic and musical director and principal conductor of the Children's Orchestra Society (COS) in New York City. WQXR, the classical music radio station of The New York Times, featured Dadap's album, Intimate Guitar Classics, in 1990. Dadap had also been given the Asian-American Alliance for the Arts Award for composing the Handurawan Dance Suite, a work that was premiered by the Brooklyn Philharmonic's Chamber Orchestra in 1988. In December 2000, Dadap was recognized as the first recipient of the 2000 Artist of the Year by the Flushing Council on the Arts in Queens, New York. On December 7, 2007, Philippine President, Gloria Macapagal Arroyo, presented Dadap the Pamana ng Lahi Award at the Malacañan Palace.

As a conductor, Dadap has worked with violinists Cho-Liang Lin, Soovin Kim and Sarah Chang, pianists Cecile Licad and Emanuel Ax, cellist (and brother-in-law) Yo-Yo Ma, flutist Paula Robison, and most recently Jaime Laredo and Sharon Robinson. His other works include the children's musical play, Five Visayan Serenades for Guitar; the full-length folkloric ballet, Alamat ng Ampalaya (Legend of the Bitter Melon); and the Legend of the Tikling Bird. Dadap is also the author of the book Complete Method for the Virtuoso Bandurria.

Dadap was one of the featured performing artists during the celebratory musical program for the 109th anniversary of Philippine independence, Pamana (A Heritage of Philippine Music), a presentation held at the Kalayaan Hall of the Philippine Center in New York City on June 11, 2007. Dadap's performance was followed by a recital by the Filipino pianist, Adolovni Acosta.

== Personal life ==
Dadap is a Queens, New York resident. He lives with his wife, Yeou-Cheng Ma, the eldest sister of Yo-Yo Ma. Dadap has two children, Daniel and Laura.

== See also ==
- Kuh Ledesma
- Ryan Cayabyab
- Danny Barcelona
- Gabe Baltazar
- Andrea Veneracion
- Oscar Yatco
- Paula Robison
