= Technology and Livelihood Education =

Learning area of the Philippine curriculum

Technology and Livelihood Education (TLE) is one of the learning areas of the Secondary Education Curriculum used in Philippine secondary schools. As a subject in high school, its component areas are: Home Economics, Agri-Fishery Arts, Industrial Arts, and Information and Communications Technology.

TLE is also referred to as CP-TLE for Career Pathways in Technology and Livelihood Education. The 2010 Secondary Education Curriculum allocates 240 minutes per week for CP-TLE, which is equivalent to 1.2 units. However, CP-TLE is required to include practical work experience in the community, which may extend beyond its specified school hours.

== Curriculum ==
The Technical-Vocational Education-based TLE is focused on technical skills development in any area. Five common competencies, based on the training regulations of the Technical Education and Skills Development Authority (TESDA), are covered in the exploratory phase (Grades 7 and 8): mensuration and calculation, technical drafting, use of tools and equipment, maintenance of tools and equipment, and occupational health and safety. The specialization phase is from Grades 7 to 12.

The Entrepreneurship Education-based TLE is focused on the learning of some livelihood skills every quarter, so that the student may be equipped to start a small household enterprise with family members. It covers three domains: Personal Entrepreneurial Competencies, Market and Environment, and Process and Delivery. The five common competencies from TESDA are integrated in the Process and Delivery domain. §−

== Expansion ==
The 2010 Secondary Education Curriculum expanded the CP-TLE to include additional special curricular programs. This makes a total of six programs: Special Program in the Arts (SPA), Special Program in Sports (SPS); Science and Technology, Engineering, and Mathematics Program (STEM Program, previously called ESEP), Special Program in Journalism (SPJ), Technical-Vocational-Livelihood Education (TVE), and Special Program in Foreign Language (SPFL).
