= José Maceda =

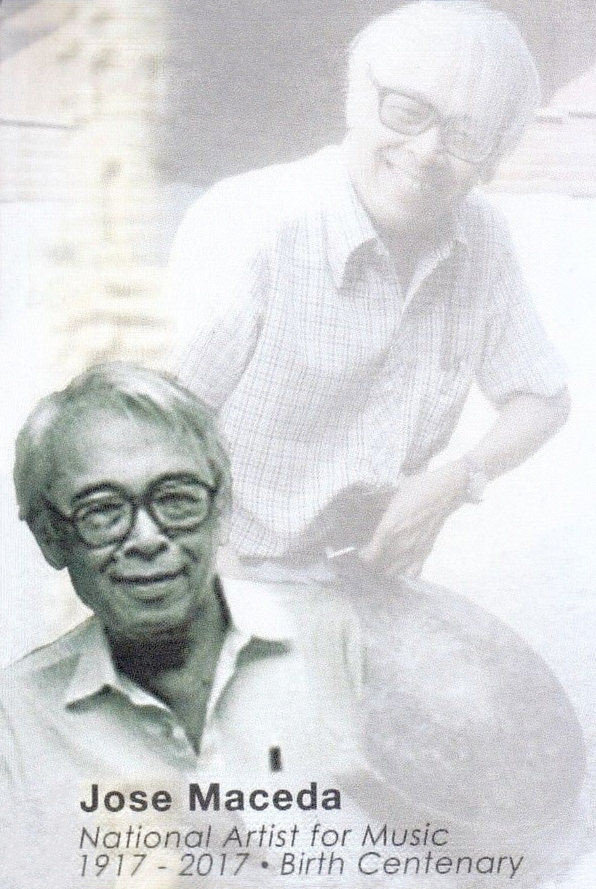

Background information
- Born: José Montserrat Maceda; 31 January 1917; Manila, Philippine Islands
- Died: 5 May 2004 (aged 87) Quezon City, Philippines
- Occupations: composer, pianist, conductor
- Instrument: piano
- Order of National Artists of the Philippines

José Montserrat Maceda (31 January 1917 – 5 May 2004) was a Filipino ethnomusicologist and composer. He was named a National Artist of the Philippines for Music in 1998.

== Life ==
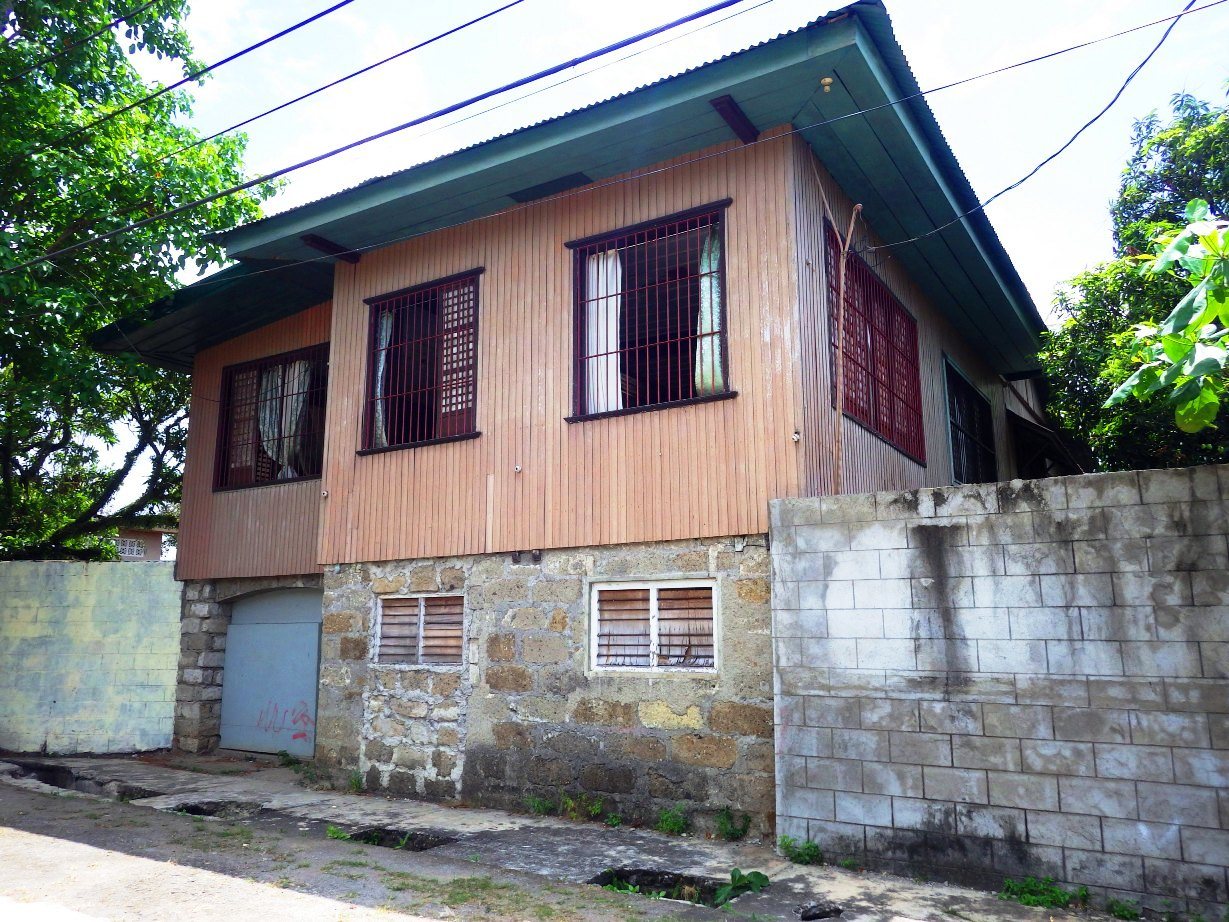
José Maceda's ancestral and childhood home in Pila, Laguna. It is now known as the Leaven of the Immaculate Heart of Mary (LIHM) Formation House.

Maceda was born on 31 January 1917 in Manila, Philippines. His parents were Casto Maceda, a well-known judge and lawyer, and Concepcion Montserrat y Salamanca who were prominent citizens of Pila, Laguna. He studied piano, composition and musical analysis at École Normale de Musique de Paris in France. After returning to the Philippines, he became a professional pianist, and later studied musicology at Columbia University, and anthropology at Northwestern University. He also started teaching at the University of the Philippines.

Starting in 1952, he conducted fieldwork on the ethnic Music of the Philippines. From about 1954, he was involved in the research and composition of musique concrète. In 1958, he worked at a recording studio in Paris which specialized in musique concrète. During this period, he met Pierre Boulez, Karlheinz Stockhausen and Iannis Xenakis. In 1963, Maceda earned a doctorate in ethnomusicology from the UCLA. He began pursuing a compositional career more vigorously. At the same time, he held concerts in Manila until 1969, in which he performed and conducted. This series of concerts introduced Boulez, Xenakis and Edgard Varèse to the Filipino public.

== Music ==
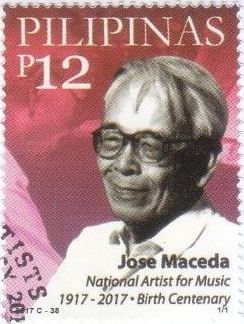
José Maceda on a 2017 stamp of the Philippines

As an ethnomusicologist, Maceda investigated various forms of music in Southeast Asia, producing numerous papers and even composing his own pieces for Southeast Asian instruments. His notable works include: Pagsamba for 116 instruments, 100 mixed and 25 male voices (1968); Cassette 100 for 100 cassette players (1971); Ugnayan for 20 radio stations (1974); Udlot-Udlot for several hundred to several thousand people (1975); Suling-Suling for 10 flutes, 10 bamboo buzzers and 10 flat gongs (1985). In 1977, Maceda aimed to study Philippine folk songs which he describes as having more focus on rhythm rather than time measure. From the 1990s, he also composed for Western orchestra and piano. The examples are: Distemperament for orchestra (1992); Colors without Rhythm for orchestra (1999); Sujeichon for 4 pianos (2002).

Jose Maceda collected audio records materials of traditional music amongst various populations in Philippines, Malaysia and Indonesia, part of these audio archives are deposited in the CNRS – Musée de l’Homme audio archives in France (a digitized version is available online). His entire musical collections were inscribed in the UNESCO Memory of the World Register in 2007, as submitted by the U.P. Center for Ethnomusicology and nominated by the Philippine government.

== Death ==
He died on May 5, 2004, in Quezon City, Philippines and was laid to rest at Himlayang Pilipino Memorial Park.

In 2007, the José Maceda Collection was inscribed in the UNESCO Memory of the World International Register. The collection included traditional musics in the Philippines and in some parts of South East Asia (Indonesia, Malaysia, Singapore, Thailand, China, and others) recorded by Maceda during the period between 1953 and 2003. The collection consists of 1760 hours of tape recordings in 1936 reels and cassette tapes, field notes, black & white and colored photographs of different musicians and instruments and some films.

== See also ==
- Ramon Santos
- Lucrecia Kasilag
- List of Memory of the World Documentary Heritage in the Philippines
