= Engineering and Science Education Program (Philippines) =

High school curriculum in the Philippines

The Science, Technology, Engineering and Mathematics Education Program (STEM, formerly Engineering and Science Education Program or ESEP) is a science and mathematics-oriented curriculum devised for high schools in the Philippines. The STEM program is offered by specialized high schools, whether public or private, supervised by the Department of Education. Currently, there are 110 high schools offering the STEM program, the majority being public. It was piloted in 1994 by the Department of Science & Technology (DOST).

== Comparison between the STEM, the RSHS Union and the PSHS System ==
All three types of science high schools in the Philippines (STEM high schools, high schools in the Regional Science High School Union and the Philippine Science High School System) offer a curriculum placing importance in mathematics and the sciences, as well as research. It is noted though that the RSHS Union and the PSHS System have much higher standards of science and mathematics education than STEM high schools. Likewise, STEM high schools and the RSHS Union are operated by Department of Education, while the PSHS system is operated by Department of Science and Technology.

In STEM high schools, transfer students are permitted to enroll provided the student is coming from another STEM high school, from an RSHS or from the PSHS System. In the Regional Science High School Union and the PSHS System, transfers are only allowed within their respective systems for incoming sophomores only. Students who wish to transfer from a STEM high school to the RSHS or PSHS systems will not be admitted, although the reverse is permissible.

All three types of science high school also maintain different grading systems. STEM high schools and the RSHS Union apply the standard grading system for high schools in the Philippines, while the PSHS System maintains a unique grading system using the 1.00-5.00 scale.

== Academic Programme ==
=== Philippine Science High School (PSHS) Core Curriculum ===
Curriculum Year Grade 7	Curriculum Year Grade 8	Curriculum Year Grade 9	Curriculum Year Grade 10
Integrated Science	Introduction to Biology (Biology 1)	Advanced Biology 1(Biology 2)	Advanced Biology 2 (Biology 3)
Elementary Algebra (Mathematics 1)	Inorganic Chemistry Part 1 (Chemistry 1)	Inorganic Chemistry Part 2 (Chemistry 2)	Advanced Chemistry (Chemistry 3)
Communication Arts 1 (English 1)	General physics (Physics 1)	Advanced Physics 1 (Physics 2)	Advanced Physics 2 (Physics 3)
Introduction to Computer Science (Computer Science 1)	Plane Geometry (Mathematics 2)	Advanced Algebra and Trigonometry (Mathematics 4)	Elementary Analysis (Mathematics 5)
Sining ng Komunikasyon (Filipino 1)	Advanced Algebra (Mathematics 3)	Software Project Planning (Computer Science 3)	Special Topics in Computer Science (Computer Science 4)
Philippine History & Government (Social Science 1)	Introduction to Programming (Computer Science 2)	Communication Arts, Asian Literature (English 3)	Communication Arts (American and European Literature) (English 4)
Introduction to Values Education (Values Education 1)	Communication Arts 2 (English 2)	Malikhaing Pagsulat (Filipino 3)	Panitikang Pilipino (Filipino 4)
Philippine History (Social Science 1)	Pagsusuri at Pagpapahalagang Pampanitikan (Filipino 2)	World History (Social Science 3)	Panitikang Pilipino (Filipino 4)
Physical Ed., Health & Music I (PEHM 1)	Asian Studies (Social Science 2)	Physical Education and Health III (PEH3)	Economics (Social Science 4)
Art I & Drafting I (one semester each)	Values Development (Values Education 2)	Principles of Science/Technology Research (Research 1)	Physical Education and Health 4 (PEH 4), Preparatory Military Training (PMT)
Earth Science	P.E., Health, Music 2 (PEHM 2)		Experimental Science, Technology Research (Research 2)
Technology Preparation	Art II / Drafting II	Elective	Elective
	Environmental Science / Technology Skills		

==== Electives ====
Curriculum Year Grade 9	Curriculum Year Grade 10
Laboratory Techniques	Digital Design
Food Science	Visual Communication
Problem-Based Physics	Cell and Molecular Biology
Selected Topics in Number Theory	Journalism II (Filipino or English)
Basic Robotics	Selected Topics in Mathematics
Data Communications	Theater Arts
Popular Law	Advanced Electronics
Creative Writing	Cisco Networking 1
English Journalism I	Embedded Systems
Filipino Journalism I	
Science Summer Internship Program (SUMMER)	
Field Biology (SUMMER)	

=== Regional Science High School (RSHS) Curriculum ===
Subject Area	Curriculum Year Grade 7	Curriculum Year Grade 8	Curriculum Year Grade 9	Curriculum Year Grade 10
Science	Earth and Environmental Science; Integrated Science	Basic Biological Science (BIO1); Advanced Biological Science (BIO2)	Chemistry I (Basic Chemistry); Physics I (Basic Physics);	Chemistry II (Advanced Chemistry); Physics II (Advanced Physics)
Mathematics	Elementary Algebra; Basic Statistics	Mathematics II-A (Advanced Algebra) Mathematics II-B (Geometry)	Mathematics III (Pre-Calculus and Trigonometry) Analytic Geometry Advanced Statistics	Calculus Linear Algebra
English	Grammar, Communication Skills, and Literature	Grammar, Communication Skills, and Afro-Asian Literature	Grammar, Communication Skills, and Asian Literature	Grammar, Communication Skills, and World Literature
Filipino	Filipino I (Ibong Adarna)	Filipino II (Florante at Laura)	Filipino III (Noli Me Tangere)	Filipino IV (El Filibusterismo)
Social Science	Araling Panlipunan I (Philippine History)	Araling Panlipunan II (Asian History)	Araling Panlipunan III (World History)	Araling Panlipunan IV (Economics)
MAPEH	Music, Arts, Physical Education, and Health I	Music, Arts, Physical Education, and Health II	Music, Arts, Physical Education, and Health III	Music, Arts, Physical Education, and Health IV
Computer Education	Computer Education I	Computer Education II	No Computer Education [for this curriculum]	No Computer Education [for this curriculum]
Research	Research I (Technical Writing and Basic Statistics)	Research II (Advanced Technical Writing II)	Research II-A (Intermediate Research in Science)	Research II-B (Advanced Research in Science)
Electives	No Electives for this Year Level	Advanced Technical Writing; Biotechnology; Botany; Business Mathematics; Journalism I; Pamamahayag I; Drafting	Speech and Drama; Technical Writing; Journalism II; Pamamahayag II	Creative Writing; Environmental Chemistry; Geology, Meteorology and Astronomy; Linear Algebra; Journalism III; Pamamahayag III, Theater Arts; French II; Humanities; Electricity

=== Science, Technology, Engineering and Mathematics Program (STEM) Curriculum ===
Subject Area	Curriculum Year Grade 7	Curriculum Year Grade 8	Curriculum Year Grade 9	Curriculum Year Grade 10
Science	Integrated Science; Earth and Environmental Science	Biological Science	Biology II(Advanced Biology); Chemistry I(Basic Chemistry); Physics I(Basic Physics)	Chemistry II(Advanced Chemistry); Physics II(Advanced Physics)
Mathematics	Elementary Algebra	Intermediate Algebra; Geometry; Basic Statistics	Trigonometry (Advanced Algebra)	Analytic Geometry; Calculus
English	Grammar, Communication Skills, and Literature	Grammar, Communication Skills, and Afro-Asian Literature	Grammar, Communication Skills, and Asian Literature	Grammar, Communication Skills, and World Literature
Filipino	Filipino I (Ibong Adarna)	Filipino II (Florante at Laura)	Filipino III (Noli Me Tangere)	Filipino IV (El Filibusterismo)
Social Science	Araling Panlipunan I (Philippine History)	Araling Panlipunan II (Asian History)	Araling Panlipunan III (World History)	Araling Panlipunan IV (Economics)
Technology and Livelihood Education	TLE I: Computer Education	TLE II: Information and Communications Technology, Agriculture/Fisheries, Civil Technology, Electronics/Electricity, Woodworking	Consumer Chemistry: Organic Chemistry, Food Chemistry, Chemistry in Everyday Life, Chemistry in Medicine	TLE IV: Information and Communications Technology, Agriculture/Fisheries, Civil Technology, Digital Electronics(Robotics)/Electricity
MAPEH	Music, Arts, Physical Education, and Health I	Music, Arts, Physical Education, and Health II	Music, Arts, Physical Education, and Health III	Music, Arts, Physical Education, and Health IV
Research	Research I-A (Basic Statistics and Technical Writing)	n/a	Research II (English for Science and Tech., Basic Statistics in Research)	Research III (Research in Science)
Values Education	Values Education I	Values Education II	Values Education III	Values Education IV
	Developmental Reading		Biotechnology, Advanced Statistics	

== Other programs in other fields ==
=== Technical-Vocational Education Program (TVEP) ===
The Tech-Voc program seeks to provide early training for labor skills, particularly on machine works, trade, agriculture, information technology, among others. The program is offered to graduating high school students and its main purpose is to either prepare them for college or to enable them to work in various industries.

The technical-vocational program has 18 areas of specialization which includes: machine shop, automotive technology, welding, electronics technology, building construction, furniture and cabinet making, plumbing, electricity, computer technology, food processing, animal production, fish processing, fish capture, fish culture, agriculture, PC operations and technical drawing.

Currently, there are 280 Tech-Voc high schools in the Philippines, 140 of which are priority Tech-Voc high schools.

=== Special Program in the Arts (SPA) ===
Special Program in the Arts is designed to cater to the needs of students who are talented in the arts. It is a program for students with potential talents in different fields of arts, namely, Music, Visual Arts, Theater Arts, Media Arts, Creative Writing and Dance. The Program offers a comprehensive secondary education centered in the arts, covering a range of art forms and disciplines. Arts education is an integral component of a balanced educational program and also provides the background for post-secondary level work.

=== Special Program in Journalism (SPJ) ===
Special Program in Journalism is developed to enrich the experiences, hone the journalistic skills and competencies of student-writers and to strengthen free and responsible journalism. It is designed to develop the learners’ skills in mass communication, print, online and broadcast media. Its main focus is primarily on writing as a process and as an art.

=== Special Program for Sports (SPS) ===
The Special Program in Sports is in the line with efforts of the DepEd to institutionalize a program that will identify/discover students with potential sports talents and train them for higher levels of athletic competitions. The Special Program for Sports offers a four-year secondary curriculum patterned after that of a regular high school, with specialization in sports.

== Special Science Grade School (SSGS) ==
As part of the expansion program of the Department of Educations' Engineering and Science Education Program, the Special Science Elementary School was established, to serve as feeder school for science high schools. This program envisions developing Filipino children who are equipped with scientific and technological knowledge, skills and attitudes; creative and have positive values; and lifelong learning skills to become productive partners in the development of the community and society and it aims to determine the qualities that science inclined learners possess; describe the characteristics of a good special elementary school; and determine the factors inputted into the SSES that significantly contribute to the improved performance of the learners involved in the study. Currently there are 57 special science elementary schools entire the Philippines.

SSES, according to the guidelines should have "state of the art" technology that provides for standard size classrooms of 7 meters by 9 meters with at least two computers, a television set, cassette recorder, player LCD projector, OHP, VHS/VCD/DVD player for every classroom. The classrooms should also have science laboratories, computer laboratory with multimedia and internet facilities; speech laboratory; music room and musical instruments and a gym with functional sports facilities.
