= Lucrecia Roces Kasilag =

Filipino composer and pianist

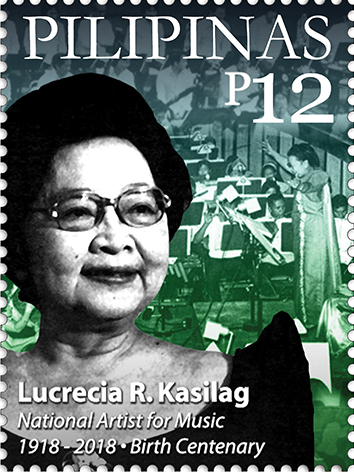
- Lucrecia Roces Kasilag on a 2018 stamp of the Philippines
- Born: Lucrecia Roces; August 31, 1918; San Fernando, La Union, Insular Government of the Philippine Islands
- Died: August 16, 2008 (aged 89); Manila, Philippines
- Occupations: Composer and pianist
- Known for: incorporationg indigenous filipino instruments of into orchestral productions
- Awards: Order of National Artists of the Philippines

Lucrecia Roces Kasilag (31 August 1918 – 16 August 2008) was a Filipino composer and pianist. She is particularly known for incorporating indigenous Filipino instruments into orchestral productions.

== Biography ==
Lucrecia "King" Roces Kasilag was born in San Fernando, La Union Philippines, the third of the six children of Marcial Kasilag Sr., a civil engineer, and his wife Asuncion Roces Ganancial, a violinist and a violin teacher. She was Kasilag's first solfeggio teacher. The second was Doña Concha Cuervo, who was a strict Spanish woman. Kasilag later studied under Doña Pura Villanueva, during which time performed her first public piece, Felix Mendelssohn's May Breezes, at a student recital when she was ten years old.

Kasilag grew up in Paco, Manila, where she was educated at Paco Elementary School and graduated valedictorian in 1930. She then transferred to Philippine Women's University for high school, where in 1933 she also graduated as valedictorian. For college, she graduated cum laude in 1936 with a Bachelor of Arts, majoring in English, in the same university. She also studied music at St. Scholastica’s College in Malate, Manila, with Sister Baptista Battig, graduating with a Music Teacher's Diploma, major in piano, in 1939.

During World War II, she took up composition, and on 1 December 1945, she performed her own compositions in a concert at Philippine Women's University. From 1946 to 1947, Kasilag taught at the University of the Philippines’ Conservatory of Music and worked as secretary-registrar at Philippines Women's University.

She completed a Bachelor of Music in 1949, and then attended the Eastman School of Music in Rochester, New York, studying theory with Allen I. McHose and composition with Wayne Barlow. Kasilag returned to the Philippines, and in 1953 she was appointed Dean of the Philippines Women's University College of Music and Fine Arts.

After completing her studies, Kasilag made an international tour as a concert pianist, but eventually had to give up a performing career due to a congenital weakness in one hand.

Kasilag was instrumental in developing Philippine music and culture. She founded the Bayanihan Folk Arts Center for research and theatrical presentations, and was closely involved with the Bayanihan Philippine Dance Company.

She was also a former president of the Cultural Center of the Philippines, head of the Asian Composers League, Chairperson of the Philippine Society for Music Education, and was one of the pioneers of the Bayanihan Dance Company. She is credited for having written more than 350 musical compositions, ranging from folksongs to opera to orchestral works, and was composing up to the year before her death.

Lucrecia Roces Kasilag died due to pneumonia on August 16, 2008, fifteen days before her 90th birthday, in Manila, Philippines.

== Selected works ==
=== Works for stage ===
- Dularawan: Salakot na Ginto (Image Play: The Golden Salakot) (1969)
- Her Son, Jose, operatorio (1977)
- The Spiritual Canticle, operatorio (1991)
- Filiasiana, choral dance kaleidoscope (1964)
- Sisa, ballet (1976)
- Why Flowers Bloom in May, opera (2008)

=== Concertos ===
- Violin Concerto no. 1 (1983)
- Violin Concerto no. 2 (1994)
- Divertissement for Piano and Orchestra (1960)

=== Choral music ===
- Misang Pilipino (Filipino mass) (1966)
- De Profundis (1977)
- Benedictus, cantata (1990)
- Ode to the President (1995)

=== Orchestral works ===
- Ang Pamana (The Heritage) (1966)
- The Legend of Sarimanok (1963)
- Philippine Scenes (1974)
- In the Beginning (1988)
- Centennial Tribute to Filipino Womanhood, Symphonic cycle (1998)

=== Chamber and solo music ===
- Derivations I-V, for piano (1961, 1963, 1966, 1969, 1982)
- Sonata in G minor, for piano (1957)
- Toccata, for Percussion and Winds (1958)
- Dialogue for Western Flutes and Pinoy Flutes (1996)
- Prelude Etnika and Toccata, for guitar (1996)
- Sonata Orientale, for piano (1961)
- Scherzino, for piano (1980)
- Rondeau, for piano (1981)
- Elegy on Mt. Pinatubo, for piano (1992)
- Serendipity, for piano (1994)

=== Music for Indigenous instruments ===
- Improvisations no. 2, for Muslim gamelan and tipangklong (1970)
- Ang Apoy ng mga Hayop (The Fire of Animals), musical tale (1986)

== Honors and awards ==
- Patnubay ng Sining at Kalinangan Award in Music, 1954
- Presidential Award of Merit as Woman Composer, 1956
- Presidential Award of Merit and Gold Medal for Leadership and Outstanding Contribution to Music and the Arts, 1960
- Republic Cultural Heritage Award in Music for the Toccata for Winds and Percussion (1960) and Misang Pilipino (1966)
- Honorary Doctor of Music from Centro Escolar University, 1975
- Honorary Doctor of Laws from the Philippine Women’s University, 1980
- Honorary Doctor of Fine Arts from St. John’s University in New York, 1981
- National Artist of the Philippines, 1989
- Outstanding Filipino Award for the Arts from Jaycee Senate International, 1991
