= List of Maalaala Mo Kaya episodes =

Maalaala Mo Kaya (transl. Would you remember?; abbreviated as MMK), also known as Memories in English, is a Philippine television series, which was first aired on May 15, 1991. MMK is the longest-running drama anthology on Philippine television.

== Series overview ==
Season	Episodes	Originally released		
Season	Episodes	First released	Last released	Network
1	53	May 15, 1991	May 27, 1992	ABS-CBN
2	65	June 3, 1992	October 13, 1993	ABS-CBN
3	63	October 20, 1993	February 15, 1995	ABS-CBN
4	55	March 2, 1995	May 2, 1996	ABS-CBN
5	30	May 9, 1996	January 9, 1997	ABS-CBN
6	62	January 23, 1997	June 4, 1998	ABS-CBN
7	39	June 11, 1998	June 17, 1999	ABS-CBN
8	37	July 1, 1999	June 24, 2000	ABS-CBN
9	34	July 6, 2000	May 10, 2001	ABS-CBN
10	42	May 24, 2001	June 27, 2002	ABS-CBN
11	48	July 4, 2002	June 26, 2003	ABS-CBN
12	49	July 3, 2003	June 24, 2004	ABS-CBN
13	45	July 1, 2004	June 23, 2005	ABS-CBN
14	32	June 30, 2005	April 27, 2006	ABS-CBN
15	43	May 4, 2006	April 27, 2007	ABS-CBN
16	49	May 4, 2007	July 11, 2008	ABS-CBN
17	43	July 19, 2008	July 25, 2009	ABS-CBN
18	51	August 1, 2009	October 2, 2010	ABS-CBN
19	47	October 9, 2010	September 24, 2011	ABS-CBN
20	57	October 1, 2011	December 29, 2012	ABS-CBN
21	51	January 5, 2013	December 28, 2013	ABS-CBN
22	51	January 4, 2014	December 20, 2014	ABS-CBN
23	51	January 3, 2015	December 26, 2015	ABS-CBN
24	51	January 2, 2016	December 31, 2016	ABS-CBN
25	51	January 7, 2017	December 30, 2017	ABS-CBN
26	48	January 6, 2018	December 29, 2018	ABS-CBN
27	47	January 5, 2019	December 28, 2019	ABS-CBN
28	53	January 4, 2020	December 26, 2020	ABS-CBN; Kapamilya Channel
29	47	January 2, 2021	December 25, 2021	Kapamilya Channel
30	22	January 1, 2022	December 10, 2022	Kapamilya Channel
31	13	April 24, 2025	July 23, 2025	iWant

== Episode list ==
=== Season 1 (1991–1992) ===
#	Episode title	Directed by	Written by	Original air date
1	"Rubber Shoes"	Maning Borlaza	Salvador Royales	May 15, 1991
Cast: Romnick Sarmenta, Vina Morales, Robert Arevalo, Hero Bautista, Ray Ventura
2	"Lampin (Cloth Diaper)"	Maning Borlaza	Salvador Royales	May 22, 1991
Cast: Helen Gamboa, Barbara Perez, Bella Flores, Jojo Abellana
3	"Bola (Ball)"	Maning Borlaza	Salvador Royales	May 29, 1991
Cast: Jestoni Alarcon, Snooky Serna, Ronnel Victor, Rocco Montalban, Hugo Linsangan
4	"Hapdi sa Puso (Heartache)"	Lino Brocka	Joey Reyes	June 5, 1991
Cast: Ricky Belmonte, Gina Pareño, Paquito Diaz, Anita Linda, William Lorenzo, Jaclyn Jose, Metring David, Archie Adamos, Ed Instrella
5	"Trahedya (Tragedy)"	Lino Brocka	Gina Marissa Tagasa	June 12, 1991
Cast: Rio Locsin, Rey PJ Abellana, Charito Solis, Joseph de Cordova, Raquel Monteza
6	"Sa Kabila Ng Pag-Ibig (Despite Love)"	Lino Brocka	Tony Perez	June 19, 1991
Cast: Carmi Martin, Gino Antonio, Raul Aragon, William Lorenzo, Timothy Diwa
7	"Punyal (Dagger)"	Maning Borlaza	Salvador Royales	June 26, 1991
Cast: Gloria Diaz, Zoren Legaspi, Ilonah Jean, Kevin Delgado
8	"Marriage Contract"	Joel Lamangan	Ronald Carballo	July 3, 1991
Cast: Vivian Foz, Juan Rodrigo, Vivian Velez, Josie Tagle, Rex Agoncillo
9	"Bote (Bottle)"	Maning Borlaza	Salvador Royales	July 10, 1991
Cast: Daria Ramirez, Ruel Vernal, Allan Bautista, Kristel Romero, Gelli de Belen, Symon Soler, Em-em Mabanglo
10	"Mananayaw (Dancer)"	Maning Borlaza	Buddy Palad	July 17, 1991
Cast: Tirso Cruz III, Richard de Dios, Luz Fernandez, Chat Silayan, Luz Valdez
11	"Sisante (Laid-off)"	Maning Borlaza	Maning Borlaza	July 24, 1991
Cast: Marianne dela Riva, Janice Jurado, Tommy Abuel, Kenneth Peralta, Mary Joanne Miller, Myrna Rosales
12	"Bahaghari (Rainbow)"	Maning Borlaza	Ruel S. Bayani	July 31, 1991
Cast: Jean Garcia, Noel Trinidad, Lucita Soriano, RR Herrera, John Gaddi, Garry Boy Garcia, Kathleen Go Quieng
13	"Sanggol (Infant)"	Maning Borlaza	Maning Borlaza	August 7, 1991
Cast: Keempee de Leon, Alicia Alonzo, Lito Legaspi, Carmina Villarroel, Lollie Mara, Harvey Vizcarra
14	"Sign Language"	Maning Borlaza	Joey Papa	August 14, 1991
Cast: Rita Avila, Mia Gutierrez, Eric Quizon, Ray Ventura, Alma Lerma
15	"Singsing (Ring)"	Maning Borlaza	Salvador Royales	August 21, 1991
Cast: Maricel Laxa, Rowell Santiago, Lloyd Samartino, Daria Ramirez, Eula Valdez, Michelle Bautista
16	"Singsing Pangkasal (Wedding Ring)"	Joel Lamangan	Frank Rivera	August 28, 1991
Cast: Michael de Mesa, Gina Alajar, Caridad Sanchez, Suzanne Gonzales, Manny Castañeda, Meryll Soriano, Jim Pebangco
17	"Sinturon (Leather Belt)"	Joel Lamangan	Ronaldo Carballo	September 4, 1991
Cast: Fanny Serrano, Gabby Concepcion, Eula Valdez, Oscar Peralta
18	"Lapis (Pencil)"	Maning Borlaza	Segundo Matias, Jr.	September 11, 1991
Cast: Lucita Soriano, Rez Cortez, Cherry Pie Picache, Lady Lee, Jaclyn Jose, Jim Moss, Perry de Guzman
19	"Sweater"	Joel Lamangan	Olivia M. Lamasan	September 18, 1991
Cast: Janno Gibbs, Bing Loyzaga, Noel Colet, Cris Daluz, Lillian Laing, Mely Tagasa
20	"Komiks (Comics)"	Maning Borlaza	Ruel Bayani	September 25, 1991
Cast: Carmi Martin, Mat Ranillo III, Rosemarie Gil, Ali Sotto, Malou de Guzman
21	"Lot 8 Blk.13"	Mac C. Alejandre	Segundo Matias	October 2, 1991
Cast: Nora Aunor, Juan Rodrigo, Susan Africa, Rina Reyes
22	"For All We Know"	Joel Lamangan	Joen Chionglo	October 9, 1991
Cast: Miguel Rodriguez, Snooky Serna, Lawrence Pineda, Vangie Labalan, Lulu Arieta
23	"Talim (Sharpness)"	Maning Borlaza	Ruel S. Bayani	October 16, 1991
Cast: Johnny Delgado, Marita Zobel, Joko Diaz, Luz Fernandez, Judy Ann Santos, Atong Redillas, Sammy Lagmay, Wilma de la Rosa, Gracelle Geronimo
24	"Pigurin (Figurine)"	Mac C. Alejandre	Segundo Matias	October 23, 1991
Cast: Aga Muhlach, Ronnie Lazaro, Beverly Vergel, Tita de Villa, Mary Walter
25	"Abito (Habit)"	Maning Borlaza	Ruel S. Bayani	October 30, 1991
Cast: Dina Bonnevie, Rey PJ Abellana, Lovely Rivero, Ester Chavez
26	"Kwadrong Basag (Shattered Picture Frame)"	Mac C. Alejandre	Ronaldo Carballo	November 6, 1991
Cast: Dawn Zulueta, Robert Arevalo, Perla Bautista, Grace Amilbangsa, Dennis Baltazar, Lolita del Mundo, Marco Ballesteros
27	"Kuwintas (Necklace)"	Maning Borlaza	Ruel S. Bayani	November 13, 1991
Cast: Bembol Roco, Beth Bautista, Mario Escudero, Alma Lerma, Marco Polo Garcia, Oliver Osorio, Maricar Tan, Bernadette Figueroa, Junell Hernando
28	"Maskara (Mask)"	Maning Borlaza	Ruel S. Bayani	November 20, 1991
Cast: Gretchen Barretto, Julio Diaz, Carmen Enriquez, Tom Olivar, Mario Salcedo
29	"Some Good Things Never Last"	Mac C. Alejandre	Ronaldo Carballo	November 27, 1991
Cast: Mark Gil, Melissa Mendez, Bernardo Bernardo, Mel Feliciano, Ana Feliciano, Symon Soler, Josie Tagle
30	"Tumba-tumba (Rocking Chair)"	Maning Borlaza	Ruel S. Bayani	December 4, 1991
Cast: Chiquito, Lara Melissa de Leon, Raquel Monteza, Ruben Rustia, Joel Torre, Terence Baylon
31	"Valedictorian Medal"	Mac C. Alejandre	Joen Chionglo	December 11, 1991
Cast: Nida Blanca, Michael Laygo, Dindo Mercado, Jennifer Sevilla, Pocholo Montes, Eva Ramos, Ruth Tuazon
32	"Noche Buena (Christmas Eve)"	Mac C. Alejandre	Ruel S. Bayani	December 18, 1991
Cast: Ricky Belmonte, Glenda Garcia, Gina Pareño, Malou de Guzman, Ruffa Gutierrez, RR Herrera
33	"Laruang Papel (Paper Toy)"	Mac C. Alejandre	Segundo Matias, Jr.	December 25, 1991
Cast: Helen Gamboa, Smokey Manaloto, Dante Rivero, Naty Santiago
34	"Cattleya"	Mac C. Alejandre	Unknown	January 8, 1992
Cast: Alice Dixson, Ian Veneracion, Luz Fernandez, Toby Alejar
35	"Alas-Dose ng Gabi (12 Midnight)"	Mac C. Alejandre	Segundo Matias, Jr.	January 15, 1992
Cast: Jackie Lou Blanco, Roderick Paulate, Kenneth Peralta, Lollie Mara, Alex Colet, Bon Vibar
36	"Wedding Ring"	Mac C. Alejandre	Roger Aquino	January 22, 1992
Cast: Gina Alajar, William Lorenzo, Rachel Alejandro, Charlie Davao, Daria Ramirez, Lucy Quinto
37	"Bundok (Mountain)"	Maning Borlaza	Segundo Matias, Jr.	January 29, 1992
Cast: Tirso Cruz III, Sheryl Cruz, Marita Zobel, Ray Ventura, Mike Austria
38	"Bulalakaw (Comet)"	Mac C. Alejandre	Segundo Matias, Jr.	February 5, 1992
Cast: Vivian Foz, Allan Bautista, Ruby Rodriguez, Aiza Seguerra, Rocco Montalban, Ruben Rustia, Estrella Kuenzler
39	"Fishpond"	Mac C. Alejandre	Segundo Matias, Jr.	February 9, 1992
Cast: Rachel Alejandro, Rustom Padilla, Charlie Davao, Daria Ramirez, Marilyn Villamayor, Carmen Enriquez
40	"Mustang"	Mac C. Alejandre	Olivia M. Lamasan	February 12, 1992
Cast: Christopher de Leon, Sandy Andolong, L.A. Lopez
41	"Lagda (Signature)"	Mac C. Alejandre	Ruel S. Bayani	February 19, 1992
Cast: Vina Morales, Barbara Perez, Ronnel Victor, Ruben Rustia, Tita de Villa, Panchito Alba, Aida Espiritu, Mario Escudero
42	"An Affair to Remember"	Joel Lamangan	Olivia M. Lamasan	February 26, 1992
Cast: Lani Mercado, Vina Morales, Miguel Rodriguez, Pocholo Montes, Dennis Baltazar, Lora Luna
43	"Piring (Blindfold)"	Maning Borlaza	Allan Rabaya	March 4, 1992
Cast: Ricky Davao, Rowell Santiago, Lito Pimentel, Amy Perez, Ester Chavez
44	"Rosaryong Itim (Black Rosary)"	Joel Lamangan	Ronaldo Carballo	March 18, 1992
Cast: Jean Garcia, Eric Quizon, Luis Gonzales, Susan Africa, Romeo Rivera
45	"Sombrero (Hat)"	Unknown	Unknown	March 25, 1992
Cast:
46	"Hawla (Cage)"	Maning Borlaza	Dado Lumibao	April 1, 1992
Cast: Amy Austria, Rey PJ Abellana, Alicia Alonzo, Rez Cortez, Orestes Ojeda, Lora Luna
47	"Classified Ads"	Mac C. Alejandre	Emil Cruz, Jr.	April 8, 1992
Cast: Janice de Belen, Michael de Mesa, Delia Razon, Glenda Garcia, Vangie Labalan, Lester Llansang
48	"Tuwalya (Towel)"	Mac C. Alejandre	Trina Javier	April 22, 1992
Cast: Aga Muhlach, Roy Alvarez, Lawrence Pineda, Luz Valdez, Eula Valdez
49	"Paper Weight"	Maning Borlaza	Jun Sto. Domingo	April 29, 1992
Cast: Gloria Diaz, Rio Diaz, Mark Gil, Junell Hernando
50	"Susi at Kandado (Key and Chain)"	Joel Lamangan	Ronaldo Carballo	May 6, 1992
Cast: Fanny Serrano, Jaclyn Jose, Rosa Rosal, Julio Diaz, Aida Carmona, Hugo Linsangan
51	"Raketa (Racket)"	Maning Borlaza	Shaira Mella-Salvador	May 13, 1992
Cast: Jackie Lou Blanco, Gabby Concepcion, Maritoni Fernandez, Tita Muñoz
52	"Rehas (Railings)"	Maning Borlaza	Unknown	May 20, 1992
Cast: Gelli de Belen, Raymart Santiago, Dante Rivero
53	"Dapithapon (Dusk)"	Mac C. Alejandre	Olivia M. Lamasan	May 27, 1992
Cast: Charo Santos, Eddie Gutierrez, Gardo Versoza, Malou de Guzman, Malou Crisologo, Kitteh Lopez, Susan Africa, Mona Lisa

=== Season 2 (1992–1993) ===
#	Episode title	Directed by	Written by	Original air date
1	"Love Birds"	Mac C. Alejandre	Frank Rivera	June 3, 1992
Cast: Tirso Cruz III, Janice de Belen, Lady Lee, Lucita Soriano
2	"Lason (Poison)"	Mac C. Alejandre	Unknown	June 17, 1992
Cast: Cris Villanueva, John Regala, Eula Valdez, Mia Pratts, Luis Gonzales
3	"Quezon Blvd."	Mac C. Alejandre	Unknown	June 24, 1992
Cast: Jennifer Sevilla, Tessie Tomas, Dexter Doria, Lito Legaspi, King Gutierrez
4	"Tiklado (Keyboard)"	Mac C. Alejandre	Olivia M. Lamasan	July 1, 1992
Cast: Edgar Mortiz, Tiya Pusit, RR Herrera, Kathleen Go Quieng, Kitteh Lopez
5	"Lanseta (Lancet)"	Joel Lamangan	Ronaldo Carballo	July 8, 1992
Cast: Sandy Andolong, Miguel Rodriguez, Susan Africa, Jordan Castillo, Jonathan Darca
6	"Abaniko (Fan)"	Mac C. Alejandre	Shaira Mella-Salvador	July 15, 1992
Cast: Lani Mercado, Ricky Davao, Nonie Buencamino, Gigette Reyes, Sunshine Dizon, Chuck del Prado
7	"Teddy Bear"	Mac C. Alejandre	Jerry Lopez-Sineneng	July 29, 1992
Cast: Gina Alajar, Amy Austria, Al Tantay, Tess Michelena
8	"Basag na Manyika (Shattered Doll)"	Mac C. Alejandre	Segundo Matias, Jr.	August 5, 1992
Cast: Gretchen Barretto, Rowell Santiago, Cherry Pie Picache, Toby Alejar
9	"Gasera (Gas Stove)"	Mac C. Alejandre	Ruel Bayani	August 12, 1992
Cast: Sheryl Cruz, Rosa Rosal, Armando Goyena, Roy Alvarez
10	"Ticket"	Mac C. Alejandre	Trina Javier	August 19, 1992
Cast: Bing Loyzaga, Monsour del Rosario, Lloyd Samartino
11	"Dede Bote (Feeding Bottle)"	Mac C. Alejandre	Jerry Lopez-Sineneng	August 26, 1992
Cast: Jaclyn Jose, Jean Garcia, Julio Diaz, Caridad Sanchez
12	"Kumot (Blanket)"	Mac C. Alejandre	Dado Lumibao	September 2, 1992
Cast: William Martinez, Eula Valdez, Robert Arevalo, Alicia Alonzo
13	"Mangga't Bagoong (Mango and Bagoong)"	Mac C. Alejandre	Shaira Mella-Salvador	September 9, 1992
Cast: Chanda Romero, Miguel Rodriguez, Suzette Ranillo, Lorli Villanueva, Freddie Garcia
14	"Trahe de Boda (Wedding Dress)"	Mac C. Alejandre	Segundo Matias, Jr.	September 16, 1992
Cast: Janice de Belen, Mark Gil, Vivian Foz, Luis Gonzales
15	"Kontrata (Contract)"	Mac C. Alejandre	Allan Rabaya	September 23, 1992
Cast: Joel Torre, Rita Avila, Lito Legaspi, Minnie Aguilar
16	"Calling Card"	Mac C. Alejandre	Shaira Mella-Salvador	September 30, 1992
Cast: Eric Quizon, Tetchie Agbayani, Charito Solis, Allan Bautista, Naty Santiago, Ryan Soler
17	"Butong Pakwan (Watermelon Seed)"	Mac C. Alejandre	Mel Mendoza-del Rosario	October 7, 1992
Cast: Gabby Concepcion, Lani Mercado, Nonie Buencamino, Shamaine Buencamino, Mely Tagasa
18	"Medalya (Medal)"	Mac C. Alejandre	Trina Javier	October 14, 1992
Cast: Jean Garcia, Rowell Santiago, Rey PJ Abellana, Lora Luna, L.A. Lopez, Anna Marie Falcon, Myrna Rosales
19	"Helmet"	Olivia M. Lamasan	Shaira Mella-Salvador	October 21, 1992
Cast: Carmina Villarroel, Rustom Padilla, Dante Rivero, Alicia Alonzo, Liezl Castro
20	"Working Visa"	Mac C. Alejandre	Jerry Lopez-Sineneng	October 28, 1992
Cast: Aiko Melendez, Gardo Versoza, Pilar Pilapil
21	"Motorsiklo (Motorcycle)"	Mac C. Alejandre	Allan Rabaya	November 4, 1992
Cast:
22	"Relo (Watch)"	Joel Lamangan	Ronaldo Carballo	November 18, 1992
Cast: Fanny Serrano, Jomar Cruz, Romano Vasquez, Aurora Salve, Roy Alvarez
23	"Walis-Tambo (Broom)"	Mac C. Alejandre	Joen Chionglo	November 25, 1992
Cast: Eula Valdez, Tirso Cruz III, Cherie Gil, Ronnie Lazaro, Lady Lee, Ray Ventura
24	"Santa Claus"	Mac C. Alejandre	Ruel Bayani	December 2, 1992
Cast: Aiza Seguerra, Judy Ann Santos, Atong Redillas, Edgar Mortiz, Dencio Padilla, Panchito Alba, Lucita Soriano, Arlene Borja
25	"Kerubin (Cherubim)"	Mac C. Alejandre	Segundo Matias, Jr.	December 9, 1992
Cast: Dolphy, Vandolph, Ruben Rustia, Vivian Foz, Toby Alejar
26	"Locket"	Olivia M. Lamasan	Shaira Mella-Salvador; Olivia M. Lamasan	December 16, 1992
Cast: Aga Muhlach, Elizabeth Oropesa, Bernardo Bernardo, Minnie Aguilar, Rusty Sangalang, Ding Lucina
27	"Christmas Tree"	Mac C. Alejandre	Trina Javier	December 23, 1992
Cast: Dawn Zulueta, Edu Manzano, Jobelle Salvador, Delia Razon, Charlotte Lugo
28	"Lusis (Firework)"	Joel Lamangan	Ronaldo Carballo	December 30, 1992
Cast: Joey Marquez, Tetchie Agbayani, Mark Anthony Fernandez, Edna May Landicho
29	"Bangkang Papel (Paper Boat)"	Joel Lamangan	Shaira Mella-Salvador	January 6, 1993
Cast: Ricky Davao, Janine Barredo, Pinky Amador, Marita Zobel, Alfred Manal
30	"Testamento (Testament)"	Mac C. Alejandre	Richard Reynante	January 13, 1993
Cast: Johnny Delgado, Jacklyn Jose, Albert Martinez, Guila Alvarez, Marco Ballesteros
31	"College Ring"	Mac C. Alejandre	Jerry Lopez-Sineneng	January 20, 1993
Cast: Tirso Cruz III, Jeffrey Santos, Melissa Mendez, Allan Bautista, Tony Mabesa, Jovit Moya, Joed Serrano, Chinkee Tan, Jonathan Darca
32	"Supot (Plastic Bag)"	Lupita Aquino-Kashiwahara	Olivia M. Lamasan	February 3, 1993
Cast: Sheryl Cruz, Perla Bautista, Daria Ramirez, Mia Gutierrez, Kier Legaspi
33	"Baby Picture"	Lupita Aquino-Kashiwahara	Olivia M. Lamasan	February 10, 1993
Cast: Dina Bonnevie, Rosa Rosal, Ernie Garcia, Stephanie Santos, Ryan Soler
34	"Walkman"	Olivia M. Lamasan	Shaira Mella-Salvador	February 17, 1993
Cast: Claudine Barretto, Eric Fructuoso, Rez Cortez, Charlie Davao, Dexter Doria, Jean Saburit
35	"Mesa (Table)"	Mac C. Alejandre	Segundo Matias, Jr.	February 24, 1993
Cast: Dante Rivero, Lito Legaspi, Alicia Alonzo, Jennifer Sevilla, Paolo Contis
36	"Nightie"	Mac C. Alejandre	Mel Mendoza-del Rosario	March 3, 1993
Cast: Jean Garcia, Eula Valdez, Miguel Rodriguez
37	"Itak (Bolo knife)"	Mac C. Alejandre	Segundo Matias, Jr.	March 17, 1993
Cast: Albert Martinez, Rita Avila, Cherry Pie Picache, Lito Pimentel, Jordan Castillo, Paquito Diaz
38	"Putik sa Damit (Mudstain)"	Mac C. Alejandre	Segundo Matias, Jr.	March 24, 1993
Cast: Gina Alajar, Michael de Mesa, Joel Torre, Tita de Villa, Royce Subido
39	"Alimasag (Crab)"	Olivia M. Lamasan	Jerry Lopez-Sineneng	March 31, 1993
Cast: Niño Muhlach, Judy Ann Santos, Karla Estrada, Toby Alejar, Anita Linda, Liza Lorena, Rocco Montalban, Mario Escudero, Philip Gamboa
40	"Usok (Smoke)"	Mac C. Alejandre	Richard Reynante	April 14, 1993
Cast: Cris Villanueva, Jenny Roa, Subas Herrero, Jaime Fabregas, Luz Valdez
41	"Biyak na Puso (Broken Heart)"	Rory B. Quintos	Olivia M. Lamasan	April 21, 1993
Cast: Lani Mercado, Jennifer Sevilla, Gardo Versoza, Robert Arevalo, Caridad Sanchez
42	"Reseta (Prescription)"	Mac C. Alejandre	Jerry Lopez-Sineneng	April 28, 1993
Cast: Donita Rose, Miguel Rodriguez, Romano Vasquez, Minnie Aguilar, Flora Gasser, Mike Austria
43	"Lapida (Gravestone)"	Olivia M. Lamasan	Jerry Lopez-Sineneng	May 5, 1993
Cast: Elizabeth Oropesa, Rosa Rosal, Estrella Kuenzler, Tommy Abuel, Ray Ventura, Katrin Gonzales, Royce Subido
44	"Goggles"	Rory B. Quintos	Trina Javier	May 12, 1993
Cast: Romeo Vasquez, Donita Rose, Miguel Rodriguez, Minnie Aguilar, Mike Austria, Flora Gasser
45	"Lumang Bahay (Old House)"	Mac C. Alejandre	Olivia M. Lamasan	May 19, 1993
Cast: Zsa Zsa Padilla, Gabby Concepcion, Charito Solis, Vangie Labalan
46	"Kalapati (Pigeon)"	Chito S. Roño	Shaira Mella-Salvador	May 26, 1993
Cast: Phillip Salvador, Gretchen Barretto, Toby Alejar, Tony Mabesa, Caridad Sanchez, Ricky Hora
47	"Tropeo (Trophy)"	Lupita Aquino-Kashiwahara	Olivia M. Lamasan	June 2, 1993
Cast: Claudine Barretto, Pilar Pilapil, Ruben Rustia, Julius Ranillo, Jamie Rivera
48	"Salamin (Mirror)"	Mac C. Alejandre	Jerry Lopez-Sineneng	June 9, 1993
Cast: William Martinez, Nanette Medved, Gloria Sevilla, Lawrence Pineda
49	"Obando"	Mac C. Alejandre	Ronaldo Carballo	June 16, 1993
Cast: Amy Austria, Michael de Mesa, Eula Valdez, Lloyd Samartino
50	"Pasalubong (Souvenir)"	Olivia M. Lamasan	Trina Javier	June 23, 1993
Cast: Jestoni Alarcon, Jean Garcia, Maila Gumila, Robert Arevalo, Lady Lee
51	"Litrato (Photograph)"	Joel Lamangan	Unknown	June 30, 1993
Cast: Zoren Legaspi, Jennifer Sevilla, Joed Serrano, Melissa Silvano, Lito Legaspi, Daria Ramirez
52	"Strawberries"	Rory B. Quintos	Shaira Mella-Salvador	July 7, 1993
Cast: Tirso Cruz III, Cherry Pie Picache, Lani Mercado, RR Herrera, Charlotte Lugo
53	"Music Box"	Olivia M. Lamasan	Richard Reynante	July 21, 1993
Cast: Carmina Villarroel, Gelli de Belen, Jeffrey Santos, Ray Ventura
54	"Recuerdo (Record)"	Rory B. Quintos	Jerry Lopez-Sineneng	July 28, 1993
Cast: Keempee de Leon, Bing Loyzaga, Charlie Davao, Liza Lorena
55	"Apoy sa Kandila (Candlelight)"	Olivia M. Lamasan	Mel Mendoza-del Rosario	August 4, 1993
Cast: Cris Villanueva, Harlene Bautista, Elizabeth Oropesa, Julio Diaz
56	"Limos (Alms)"	Rory B. Quintos	Mel Mendoza-del Rosario	August 11, 1993
Cast: Jennifer Sevilla, Eddie Gutierrez, Boots Anson-Roa, Precious Hipolito, Ester Chavez
57	"Bola (Ball)"	Rory B. Quintos	Jerry Lopez-Sineneng	August 18, 1993
Cast: Anita Linda, Gloria Romero, Gloria Sevilla, Ruben Rustia, Jigo Garcia, Tanya Gomez
58	"Bulaklak (Flower)"	Jose Javier Reyes	Ronaldo Carballo	August 25, 1993
Cast: Roderick Paulate, Eagle Riggs, Al Tantay, Lucita Soriano
59	"Stethoscope"	Rory B. Quintos	Jerry Lopez-Sineneng	September 1, 1993
Cast: Janice de Belen, Joel Torre, Eddie Rodriguez, Mel Kimura
60	"Tsapa (Badge)"	Olivia M. Lamasan	Ronaldo Carballo	September 8, 1993
Cast: Ricky Davao, Rita Avila, Allan Bautista, Camille Velasco
61	"Divan"	Lore Reyes; Peque Gallaga	Jerry Lopez-Sineneng	September 15, 1993
Cast: Albert Martinez, Eula Valdez, Malou de Guzman, Debraliz
62	"Bote at Yantok (Bottle and Rattan Cane)"	Rory B. Quintos	Richard Reynante	September 22, 1993
Cast: William Martinez, Snooky Serna, Lorli Villanueva, Ernie Zarate, Guila Alvarez, Vangie Labalan
63	"Larawan (Picture)"	Olivia M. Lamasan	Shaira Mella-Salvador	September 29, 1993
Cast: Bembol Roco, Isabel Rivas, Ronnie Lazaro, Minnie Aguilar
64	"Picture Frame"	Rory B. Quintos	John-D Lazatin	October 6, 1993
Cast: Gardo Versoza, Monique Wilson, Cris Villanueva, Anna Marie Falcon, Odette Khan
65	"Mga Buto at Punla (Seeds and Seedlings)"	Rory B. Quintos	Mel Mendoza-del Rosario	October 13, 1993
Cast: Dante Rivero, Helen Gamboa, Fredmoore delos Santos, Guila Alvarez, Alfred Manal, Berting Labra

=== Season 3 (1993–1995) ===
#	Episode title	Directed by	Written by	Original air date
1	"Kamao (Fist)"	Olivia M. Lamasan	Jerry Lopez-Sineneng	October 20, 1993
Cast: Jaclyn Jose, Rey PJ Abellana, Lito Pimentel, Jimmy Santos, Ronnel Victor, Jenny Roa, Lorenzo Mara
2	"Kapirasong Sulat (Piece of a Letter)"	Olivia M. Lamasan	Jerry Lopez-Sineneng	October 27, 1993
Cast: Jeffrey Santos, Ana Roces, Ronaldo Valdez, Liza Lorena, Paolo Contis
3	"Placement Fee"	Rory B. Quintos	Jerry Lopez-Sineneng	November 3, 1993
Cast: Jeric Raval, Jamie Rivera, Barbara Perez, Mia Pratts
4	"TV Set"	Olivia M. Lamasan	Yves Manalili	November 10, 1993
Cast: Ricky Davao, Amy Austria, Lucita Soriano, Toby Alejar
5	"Brilyante at Bubog (Jewels and Broken Glass)"	Rory B. Quintos	Mel Mendoza-del Rosario	November 17, 1993
Cast: Claudine Barretto, Tommy Abuel, Ernie Garcia, Aurora Sevilla, Koko Pimentel
6	"Pera at Diploma (Money and Diploma)"	Olivia M. Lamasan	Jerry Lopez-Sineneng	November 24, 1993
Cast: Manilyn Reynes, Tessie Tomas, Shintaro Valdez, Marilyn Villamayor, Miguel Garcia
7	"Matchbox"	Rory B. Quintos	Segundo Matias, Jr.	December 9, 1993
Cast: Smokey Manaloto, Jigo Garcia, Judy Ann Santos, Robert Arevalo
8	"Christmas Card"	Rory B. Quintos	Jerry Lopez-Sineneng	December 15, 1993
Cast: Keempee de Leon, Boots Anson-Roa, Dante Rivero
9	"Munting Bituin (Little Star)"	Olivia M. Lamasan	Ronaldo Carballo	December 22, 1993
Cast: Nida Blanca, Miguel Rodriguez, Boy2 Quizon, Royce Subido
10	"Bibingka't Puto Bungbong (Rice Cakes)"	Rory B. Quintos	Ronaldo Carballo	December 29, 1993
Cast: Mark Anthony Fernandez, Eric Fructuoso, Isabel Granada, Lucita Soriano, Jomari Yllana
11	"Walking Doll"	Olivia M. Lamasan	Jerry Lopez-Sineneng	January 12, 1994
Cast: Elizabeth Oropesa, Cherry Pie Picache, Anthony Alonzo
12	"Bakya (Clogs)"	Olivia M. Lamasan	Richard Reynante	January 19, 1994
Cast: Tirso Cruz III, Sylvia Sanchez, Tanya Gomez, Caridad Sanchez, Allan Bautista
13	"Manok (Chicken)"	Rory B. Quintos	Ronaldo Carballo	January 26, 1994
Cast: William Martinez, Paquito Diaz, Perla Bautista, Isko Moreno
14	"Perya (Fair)"	Rory B. Quintos	Jerry Lopez-Sineneng	February 2, 1994
Cast: Ai Ai delas Alas, Edgar Mortiz, Jao Mapa
15	"Mamera (One-cent price)"	Rory B. Quintos	John-D Lazatin	February 9, 1994
Cast: Aljon Jimenez, Gloria Sevilla, Richard Arellano, Vangie Labalan, Guila Alvarez
16	"Tropeo at Medalyon (Trophy and Medallion)"	Rory B. Quintos	Jerry Lopez-Sineneng	February 9, 1994
Cast: Christopher de Leon, Al Tantay, Melissa Mendez, Antoinette Taus
17	"Necklace"	Rory B. Quintos	Don Cuaresma	February 16, 1994
Cast: Eula Valdez, Chin Chin Gutierrez, Shintaro Valdez, Dante Rivero
18	"Insurance"	Rory B. Quintos	Richard Reynante	February 23, 1994
Cast: Gardo Versoza, Cherry Pie Picache, Jeffrey Santos, Jennifer Sevilla, Luis Gonzales
19	"Butas sa Dingding (Hole in the Wall)"	Rory B. Quintos	Segundo Matias, Jr.	March 2, 1994
Cast: Albert Martinez, Joel Torre, Sharmaine Arnaiz, Anita Linda
20	"Tapwe (50 pesos)"	Olivia M. Lamasan	Olivia M. Lamasan	March 15, 1994
Cast: Jackie Lou Blanco, William Martinez, Lucita Soriano, Pocholo Montes, Mel Kimura, Alfred Manal
21	"Ulap (Cloud)"	Joel Torre	John-D Lazatin	March 24, 1994
Cast: Gelli de Belen, Amy Perez, Cris Villanueva, Ray Ventura, Marita Zobel
22	"Titulo (Title)"	Rory B. Quintos	Jerry Lopez-Sineneng	April 6, 1994
Cast: Cristina Gonzales, William Lorenzo, Dexter Doria, Liza Lorena, Robert Arevalo
23	"Tanikala (Chains)"	Chito S. Roño	Mel Mendoza-del Rosario	April 13, 1994
Cast: Jaclyn Jose, Rosa Rosal, Tito Arévalo, Mely Tagasa, Angel Confiado, Daniel Fernando, Royce Subido, Robert Talby
24	"Tutong na Sinaing (Burnt Rice)"	Rory B. Quintos	Mel Mendoza-del Rosario	April 20, 1994
Cast: Lani Mercado, Rustom Padilla, Luz Fernandez, Tess Michelena, Raffy Bonanza, Lora Luna
25	"Toga"	Joel Torre	Richard Reynante	April 27, 1994
Cast: Jomari Yllana, Lito Legaspi, Daria Ramirez, Jean Saburit, Robert Ortega, Meryll Soriano
26	"Patalim (Blade)"	Olivia M. Lamasan	Olivia M. Lamasan	May 4, 1994
Cast: Gary Estrada, Kristina Paner, Al Tantay, Liza Lorena, Malou Crisologo, Naty Santiago
27	"Eraser"	Olivia M. Lamasan	Olivia M. Lamasan	May 11, 1994
Cast: Snooky Serna, Lito Pimentel, Cherry Pie Picache, Alicia Alonzo, Jao Mapa
28	"Batingaw (Bell)"	Rory B. Quintos	Jerry Lopez-Sineneng	May 25, 1994
Cast: Chuckie Dreyfus, Mark Anthony Fernandez, Katrin Gonzales, Pilar Pilapil, Camille Mortiz
29	"Credit Card"	Rory B. Quintos	Jerry Lopez-Sineneng	June 1, 1994
Cast: Elizabeth Oropesa, John Estrada, Julio Diaz, Lucita Soriano, Camille Velasco
30	"Tinik sa Rosas (Rose Thorns)"	Joel Torre	Segundo Matias, Jr.	June 8, 1994
Cast: Gina Alajar, Mat Ranillo III, Susan Africa, Angelu de Leon, John Michael Belmonte
31	"Krus na Daan (Crossroad)"	Joel Torre	Jerry Lopez-Sineneng	June 22, 1994
Cast: Kier Legaspi, Gina Pareño, Eva Darren, Tom Olivar, Shintaro Valdez, Richard Arellano
32	"Hair Dye"	Rory B. Quintos	Don Cuaresma	June 29, 1994
Cast: Albert Martinez, Beverly Vergel, Shiela Ysrael, Eddie Rodriguez, Gloria Sevilla, Minnie Aguilar, Karl Angelo Legaspi
33	"Sandcastle"	Joel Torre	Trina Javier	July 6, 1994
Cast: Gary Valenciano, Pinky Amador, Anita Linda, Sherry Lara, Janus del Prado, Angelina Kanapi
34	"Wedding Picture"	Joel Torre	Jerry Lopez-Sineneng	July 13, 1994
Cast: Ariel Rivera, Ali Sotto, Chanda Romero, Lorli Villanueva, Mel Kimura, Charmie Benavidez
35	"Rosas (Roses)"	Rory B. Quintos	Shaira Mella-Salvador; Olivia M. Lamasan	July 20, 1994
Cast: Jean Garcia, John Estrada, Yayo Aguila
36	"Bahay Ampunan (Orphanage)"	Eddie Rodriguez	Jerry Lopez-Sineneng	July 24, 1994
Cast: Lovely Rivero, Lady Lee, Alfred Manal, Royce Subido, Camille Velasco
37	"Chimes"	Rory B. Quintos	Mel Mendoza-del Rosario	August 3, 1994
Cast: Dina Bonnevie, Joel Torre, Fanny Serrano, Anita Linda, Camille Prats, Karl Angelo Legaspi, Kitteh Lopez
38	"Rubber Duckie"	Joel Torre	Trina Javier	August 10, 1994
Cast: Jackie Lou Blanco, Miguel Rodriguez, Amy Perez, Tita de Villa, Tess Michelena
39	"Baraha (Playing Card)"	Joel Torre	Jerry Lopez-Sineneng	August 17, 1994
Cast: William Martinez, Gardo Versoza, Rey PJ Abellana, Rita Avila
40	"Boteng Basag (Broken Bottle)"	Eddie Rodriguez	Ronaldo Carballo	August 24, 1994
Cast: Niño Muhlach, Smokey Manaloto, Aljon Jimenez, Perla Bautista, Pen Medina, Delia Razon
41	"Palara (Tin Foil)"	Rory B. Quintos	John-D Lazatin	August 31, 1994
Cast: Elizabeth Oropesa, Eric Fructuoso, Jeffrey Santos, Sunshine Dizon, Ryan Ostrea
42	"Dancing Shoes"	Eddie Rodriguez	Jerry Lopez-Sineneng	September 7, 1994
Cast: Nida Blanca, Nestor de Villa, Mely Tagasa, Luz Fernandez, Ryan Soler, Eva Darren, Eva Ramos, Idda Yanesa
43	"Cassette Tape"	Joel Torre	Ronaldo Carballo	September 14, 1994
Cast: John Regala, Amy Austria, Lorenzo Mara, Spanky Manikan, CJ Ramos, Samson Martinez
44	"Selyo (Seal)"	Olivia M. Lamasan	John-D Lazatin	September 21, 1994
Cast: Cesar Montano, Dayanara Torres, Lorli Villanueva, Minnie Aguilar, Ray Ventura
45	"Pusong Ginto (Golden Heart)"	Khryss Adalia	Agnes Gagelonia-Uligan	September 28, 1994
Cast: Robert Arevalo, Barbara Perez, Janice de Belen, Chuckie Dreyfus, William Lorenzo, Estrella Kuenzler
46	"Pilat (Scar)"	Olivia M. Lamasan	Mel Mendoza-del Rosario	October 5, 1994
Cast: Donna Cruz, Nikka Valencia, Gina Pareño, Charlie Davao, Alicia Alonzo, Shintaro Valdez, Naty Santiago
47	"Videocam"	Khryss Adalia	Carmen Cabling	October 12, 1994
Cast: Ricky Davao, Chat Silayan, Tina Revilla, Mat Ranillo III, Aiza Seguerra, Boy2 Quizon, Flora Gasser
48	"Paru-paro (Butterfly)"	Joel Torre	Gina Marissa Tagasa	October 19, 1994
Cast: Kris Aquino, Lander Vera-Perez, Angelu de Leon, Bella Flores, Dexter Doria, Lito Legaspi, Marlon Mance
49	"Bracelet"	Richard Reynante	Richard Reynante; Olivia M. Lamasan	October 26, 1994
Cast: Rica Peralejo, Jan Marini Alano, Susan Hosseinzadeh, Sandy Andolong, Miguel Rodriguez, Dante Rivero
50	"Itim na Damit (Black Clothes)"	Michael de Mesa	Mel Mendoza-del Rosario	November 9, 1994
Cast: Alicia Alonzo, Sharmaine Arnaiz, Nonie Buencamino, Manjo Del Mundo, Tess Dumpit, Rowell Santiago
51	"Pamana (Legacy)"	Khryss Adalia	Jerry Lopez-Sineneng	November 16, 1994
Cast: Donita Rose, Ana Roces, Anna Marie Falcon, Nanette Medved, Rosemarie Gil
52	"Gavel"	Rory B. Quintos	Agnes Gagelonia-Uligan	November 23, 1994
Cast: Elizabeth Oropesa, Teresa Loyzaga, Al Tantay, Jean Saburit, Mia Gutierrez
53	"Class Card"	Laurenti M. Dyogi	John-D Lazatin	November 30, 1994
Cast: Niño Muhlach, Cris Villanueva, Jennifer Sevilla, Karla Estrada
54	"Storybook"	Khryss Adalia	Agnes Gagelonia-Uligan	December 7, 1994
Cast: Ricky Davao, Lani Mercado, Alicia Alonzo, Lady Lee
55	"Tsokolate, Manika, at Libro (Chocolate, Doll and Book)"	Lupita Aquino-Kashiwahara	Mel Mendoza-del Rosario	December 14, 1994
Cast: Nanette Inventor, Cynthia Patag, Mitch Valdez, Pen Medina, Janus del Prado, Karl Angelo Legaspi, Royce Subido, Sarah Jane Abad
56	"Pakpak ng Anghelito (Wings of a Little Angel)"	Rory B. Quintos	Shaira Mella-Salvador	December 21, 1994
Cast: Edu Manzano, Jackie Lou Blanco, CJ Ramos, Allan Bautista, Aleli Baguio
57	"Sa Kandungan Mo, Inay (In your embrace, Mother)"	Olivia M. Lamasan	Ruel S. Bayani; Olivia M. Lamasan	December 30, 1994
Cast: Charo Santos, Dina Bonnevie, Janice de Belen, Mat Ranillo III, Mark Gil, Dante Rivero, Alicia Alonzo, Judy Ann Santos, Gladys Reyes, Jeffrey Santos, Ryan Soler, Sylvia Sanchez, Minnie Aguilar, Ray Ventura, Shintaro Valdez, Angelica Panganiban, Karl Angelo Legaspi
58	"Bintana (Window)"	Eddie Rodriguez	Jerry Lopez-Sineneng	January 11, 1995
Cast: Paquito Diaz, Perla Bautista, Ana Roces, Symon Soler, Ramil Rodriguez, Ruth Tuazon
59	"Kasulatan (Writings)"	Olivia M. Lamasan	Jerry Lopez-Sineneng; Olivia M. Lamasan	January 18, 1995
Cast: Romnick Sarmenta, Manilyn Reynes, Luz Fernandez, Charlie Davao, Timothy Diwa
60	"Keychain"	Laurenti M. Dyogi	Wenn V. Deramas	January 25, 1995
Cast: Isko Moreno, Eric Fructuoso, Angelu de Leon, Dexter Doria, Liza Lorena, Romeo Rivera
61	"Saklay (Crutches)"	Armando A. Reyes	Mel Mendoza-del Rosario	February 1, 1995
Cast: Janice de Belen, Eula Valdez, Tonton Gutierrez, Allan Paule, Pocholo Montes
62	"Alampay (Shawl)"	Michael de Mesa	Jerry Lopez-Sineneng	February 8, 1995
Cast: Gloria Romero, Mark Gil, Isabel Granada, Caridad Sanchez, Jean Saburit, Anne Villegas
63	"Tari (Cockspur)"	Rory B. Quintos	Carmen Cabling	February 15, 1995
Cast: Charo Santos, Albert Martinez, Gina Pareño, Gloria Sevilla, Shirley Fuentes, Shintaro Valdez

=== Season 4 (1995–1996) ===
#	Episode title	Directed by	Written by	Original air date
1	"Blackboard"	Rory B. Quintos	Mari Mariano	March 2, 1995
Cast: Kier Legaspi, Mia Gutierrez, Charlie Davao, Noel Trinidad, Marita Zobel, Joy Viado, Shielu Bharwani, Raul Arellano, Amiel Leonardia
2	"Korona (Crown)"	Lupita Aquino-Kashiwahara	Jerry Lopez-Sineneng	March 9, 1995
Cast: Jennifer Sevilla, Juan Rodrigo, Chin-Chin Gutierrez, Pen Medina, Richard Quan, Lailani Navarro, Imelda Ilanan
3	"Boxing Gloves"	Rory B. Quintos	Mel Mendoza-del Rosario	March 16, 1995
Cast: Raymond Bagatsing, Jaclyn Jose, Rez Cortez, Bembol Roco, Karl Angelo Legaspi
4	"Kuna (Cradle)"	Rory B. Quintos	Jerry Lopez-Sineneng	March 25, 1995
Cast: Ricky Davao, Jean Garcia, Alicia Alonzo, Dindo Arroyo, Lora Luna, Mel Kimura, John Gaddi
5	"Medalyang Ginto (Gold Medal)"	Michael de Mesa	Agnes Gagelonia-Uligan	March 30, 1995
Cast: Eula Valdez, Yayo Aguila, Cris Villanueva, Boots Anson-Roa, Dante Rivero, Nikka Valencia, Timothy Diwa
6	"Doormat"	Benji Garcia	Cory Criste; Dado C. Lumibao	April 6, 1995
Cast: Beth Tamayo, Jennifer Mendoza, Aljon Jimenez, Marco Polo Garcia, Rosemarie Gil, Lito Legaspi, Ruth Tabar
7	"Green Card"	Khryss Adalia	Agnes Gagelonia-Uligan	April 20, 1995
Cast: Mat Ranillo III, Rio Locsin, Michelle van Eimeren, Perla Bautista, Emmanuel Esturco, John Michael Belmonte
8	"Paddle"	Laurenti M. Dyogi	Richard Reynante	April 27, 1995
Cast: Jao Mapa, Gio Alvarez, Piolo Pascual, Tommy Abuel, Jean Saburit, Tita de Villa
9	"Alon (Wave)"	Olivia M. Lamasan	Shaira Mella-Salvador	May 4, 1995
Cast: Rita Avila, Gabby Concepcion, Gina Pareño, Shamaine Buencamino, Efren Reyes Jr., Glenda Garcia, Ryan Soler, Aleli Baguio
10	"Bigkis (Bundle)"	Khryss Adalia	Carmen Cabling	May 11, 1995
Cast: Sherilyn Reyes, Bamba, Raquel Monteza, Marissa Delgado, Jane Zaleta, Jeanne Young, Tess Michelena, Nestor Escano, Ronaldo Bertubin
11	"Simbahan (Church)"	Michael de Mesa	Mel Mendoza-del Rosario	May 25, 1995
Cast: Tirso Cruz III, Gloria Diaz, Isko Moreno, Beth Tamayo, Jaime Fabregas, Rosemarie Gil
12	"Ukit (Carving)"	Olivia M. Lamasan	Mari Mariano	June 1, 1995
Cast: Michael V., Jackie Lou Blanco, Pilita Corrales, Ricky Davao, Lito Pimentel, Minnie Aguilar, Mely Tagasa, Allan Bautista, Lora Luna, Danny Punzalan
13	"Palayok at Pintura (Clay Pot and Paint)"	Khryss Adalia	Jerry Lopez-Sineneng	June 8, 1995
Cast: Mark Gil, Rio Locsin, Angelica Panganiban, Gloria Sevilla, Armando Goyena, Tita de Villa
14	"Lupa (Land)"	Olivia M. Lamasan	Shaira Mella-Salvador	June 15, 1995
Cast: Elizabeth Oropesa, Agot Isidro, Monsour del Rosario, Eula Valdez, Eva Darren, Carol Dauden, Ray Ventura, Rey Sagum
15	"Guardian Angel"	Eddie Rodriguez	Don Cuaresma	June 22, 1995
Cast: Janice de Belen, Susan Africa, Spanky Manikan, Michael Cruz, Noel Nuguit, Justine Hail de Jesus, Sheila Diamse, Zeus Inocencio, Lorna Lopez, Janice Pronstroller, Carol Reyes, Agatha Tapan, Idda Yaneza, Camille Velasco
16	"Upos (Stub)"	Eddie Rodriguez	Jerry Lopez-Sineneng	June 29, 1995
Cast: Julio Diaz, Aiko Melendez, Aljon Jimenez, Rowell Santiago, Pen Medina
17	"Panyo (Handkerchief)"	Joel Torre	John-D Lazatin	July 6, 1995
Cast: Carmina Villarroel, Eric Quizon, Sheila Ysrael, Romeo Vasquez, Spanky Manikan, Marita Zobel
18	"Batis (Stream)"	Jerry Lopez-Sineneng	Jerry Lopez-Sineneng	July 13, 1995
Cast: Cesar Montano, Anita Linda, Luz Fernandez, Rolando Tinio, Lailani Navarro, Shintaro Valdez, Mel Kimura
19	"Perlas (Pearls)"	Lupita Aquino-Kashiwahara	Shaira Mella-Salvador	July 20, 1995
Cast: Shirley Fuentes, William Martinez, Charlie Davao, Angel Confiado, Karl Angelo Legaspi, Charlotte Lugo, Imelda Ilanan, Philip Gamboa
20	"Armas (Arms)"	Emil Cruz Jr.	Emil Cruz Jr.	July 27, 1995
Cast: Jean Garcia, Rommel Padilla, Rachel Lobangco, Bembol Roco, Manjo del Mundo, Rey Sagum
21	"Payaso (Clown)"	Manny Castañeda	Carmen Cabling	August 3, 1995
Cast: Anjo Yllana, Jomari Yllana, Allan Paule, Daria Ramirez, Piolo Pascual, Kristine Garcia, Emmanuel Esturco, Ronaldo Bertubin, Paulie Yllana
22	"Kropek"	Khryss Adalia	Mari Mariano	August 10, 1995
Cast: Jaclyn Jose, Teresa Loyzaga, Boy2 Quizon, Camille Prats, Paula Peralejo, Ani Pearl Alonzo, Angelica Pedersen, Tony Mabesa, Dang Cruz
23	"Durian"	Nick Lisazo	Mel Mendoza-del Rosario	August 17, 1995
Cast: Albert Martinez, Liezl Martinez, Gardo Versoza, Angelica Panganiban, CJ Ramos, Ester Chavez
24	"Basura (Garbage)"	Olivia M. Lamasan	Mari Mariano	August 24, 1995
Cast: Romnick Sarmenta, Cris Villanueva, Shielu Bharwani, Chin-Chin Gutierrez, Gina Pareño, Jay Cayuca, Ramil Rodriguez
25	"Punso (Anthill)"	Jerry Lopez-Sineneng	Jerry Lopez-Sineneng	August 31, 1995
Cast: Smokey Manaloto, Aljon Jimenez, Elizabeth Oropesa, Lito Legaspi, Lucita Soriano, Vangie Labalan, McMac Lopez, Myrna Rosales, Mae-Ann Adonis
26	"Bilangguan (Prison)"	Nick Lizaso	Arnold Lamasan	September 7, 1995
Cast: Snooky Serna, Ricardo Cepeda, Dante Rivero, Sherry Lara, Ray Ventura
27	"Engagement Ring"	Manny Castañeda	Agnes Gagelonia-Uligan	September 14, 1995
Cast: Gina Alajar, Michael de Mesa, Cherry Pie Picache, Ces Quesada, Tiya Pusit, Alma Lerma, Idda Yaneza
28	"Latay (Welt)"	Khryss Adalia	Mel Mendoza-del Rosario	September 21, 1995
Cast: Angelu de Leon, Sunshine Dizon, Luigi Alvarez, Celia Rodriguez, Karl Angelo Legaspi, Anne Villegas, Lora Luna
29	"Tawas (Alum)"	Soxie Topacio	Agnes Gagelonia-Uligan	September 28, 1995
Cast: Ina Raymundo, Paula Peralejo, Pilar Pilapil, Ronnie Lazaro, Anthony Cortez, Philip Gamboa
30	"Alkansya (Piggy-bank)"	Eddie Rodriguez	Richard Reynante	October 5, 1995
Cast: Ana Roces, Anna Larrucea, Ani Pearl Alonzo, Agatha Tapan, Eula Valdez, Jigo Garcia, John Arcilla, Susan Africa, Amabel Quiambao, Mae-Ann Adonis, Troy Martino, Lucy Quinto
31	"Pigurin (Figurine)"	Laurenti M. Dyogi	Enrico C. Santos	October 12, 1995
Cast: Alice Dixson, Teresa Loyzaga, Yayo Aguila, Cris Michelena, Lee Robin Salazar, Jackie Castillejo
32	"Bayong (Shopping Bag)"	Emil Cruz Jr.	Emil Cruz Jr.	October 19, 1995
Cast: Romnick Sarmenta, Beth Tamayo, Brando Legaspi, Noel Trinidad, Marita Zobel, Mike Gayoso
33	"Balon (Well)"	Olivia M. Lamasan	Mel Mendoza-del Rosario	October 26, 1995
Cast: Angelica Panganiban, Rachel Alejandro, Cris Villanueva, Jean Saburit, Gamaliel Viray, Romeo Rivera, Lilia Cuntapay
34	"Nitso (Tomb)"	Jerry Lopez-Sineneng	Jerry Lopez-Sineneng	November 2, 1995
Cast: Amy Austria, Daniel Fernando, Lito Pimentel, CJ Ramos, Patricia Ann Roque, Lawrence David
35	"Imbitasyon (Invitation)"	Rory B. Quintos	Enrico C. Santos	November 16, 1995
Cast: Ricky Davao, Eula Valdez, William Martinez, Tita de Villa, Manjo del Mundo, Val Iglesias, Dante Castro
36	"Gusali (Building)"	Olivia M. Lamasan	Mari Mariano	November 30, 1995
Cast: Zsa Zsa Padilla, Mat Ranillo III, Gina Pareño, Ramil Rodriguez, Cris Garcia, Ray Ventura
37	"Mansyon (Mansion)"	Rory B. Quintos	Jerry Lopez-Sineneng	December 7, 1995
Cast: Chuckie Dreyfus, Beth Tamayo, Pilar Pilapil, Dante Rivero, Anita Linda, Nestor Escano
38	"Kuwerdas (Chord)"	Jerry Lopez-Sineneng	Ruel S. Bayani	December 14, 1995
Cast: Janno Gibbs, Bing Loyzaga, Ronaldo Valdez, Pocholo Montes, Elaine Eigenmann
39	"Abo (Ash)"	Olivia M. Lamasan	Ricky Lee; Mulawin Gerardo Bulatao	December 21, 1995
Cast: Roderick Paulate, Kristopher Peralta, Royce Subida, Ani Pearl Alonzo, Caridad Sanchez, Bembol Roco, Sylvia Sanchez
40	"Lampara (Lamp)"	Rory B. Quintos	Shaira Mella-Salvador	December 28, 1995
Cast: Romnick Sarmenta, Beth Tamayo, Eva Darren, Rey Sagum, Cesar Xeres-Burgos, Naty Mallares
41	"Maleta (Suitcase)"	Emil Cruz Jr.	Emil Cruz Jr.	January 11, 1996
Cast: Marjorie Barretto, Rochelle Barrameda, Brando Legaspi, Mely Tagasa
42	"Dugo (Blood)"	Rory B. Quintos	Chris Millado	January 25, 1996
Cast: Bembol Roco, Jean Saburit, Lee Robin Salazar, Connie Chua, Michael Roy Jornales, Pamela delos Santos, Cris Daluz
43	"Pusang Itim (Black Cat)"	Jerry Lopez-Sineneng	Jerry Lopez-Sineneng	February 1, 1996
Cast: G. Toengi, Ian Veneracion, Lailani Navarro, Luigi Alvarez, Cholo Escaño, Michael Rivero
44	"Bonsai"	Jerry Lopez-Sineneng	John-D Lazatin	February 8, 1996
Cast: Cristina Gonzales, Ericka Fife, Mike Austria, Joy Ortega, Dexter Doria, Bonel Balingit, Beverly Salviejo, Berting Labra
45	"Valentines Card"	Manny Castañeda	Ruel S. Bayani	February 15, 1996
Cast: Claudine Barretto, Rico Yan, Sharmaine Arnaiz, Robin da Roza, Marita Zobel, Ruby Rosa
46	"Putik (Mud)"	Khryss Adalia	Mel Mendoza-del Rosario	February 22, 1996
Cast: Boots Anson-Roa, Gloria Sevilla, Rosa Rosal, Matthew Mendoza, Nikka Valencia
47	"Holen (Game of Marbles)"	Khryss Adalia	Arnold Lamasan	February 25, 1996
Cast: Jean Garcia, Mat Ranillo III, Celia Rodriguez, Stefano Mori
48	"Karinderya (Eatery)"	Nick Lizaso	Carmen Cabling	March 14, 1996
Cast: Sheryl Cruz, Cris Villanueva, Eula Valdez, Richard Quan, Ray Ventura
49	"Hamog (Fog)"	Olivia M. Lamasan	Ruel S. Bayani	March 21, 1996
Cast: Ricky Davao, Chin-Chin Gutierrez, Victor Neri, Amiel Leonardia
50	"Samurai"	Khryss Adalia	Dado C. Lumibao	March 28, 1996
Cast: Romnick Sarmenta, Tessie Tomas, Anita Linda, Ilonah Jean, Marc Solis, Koko Trinidad, Anne Villegas
51	"Apron"	Rory B. Quintos	Mari Mariano	April 11, 1996
Cast: Eric Quizon, Rita Avila, Gloria Sevilla, Karl Angelo Legaspi, Ani Pearl Alonzo, Mae-Ann Adonis
52	"Gayuma (Charm)"	Manny Castañeda	Agnes Gagelonia-Uligan	April 18, 1996
Cast: Ina Raymundo, Carmi Martin, Tony Santos Jr., Boyong Baytion, Allan Bautista, Shintaro Valdez, Korinne Lirio
53	"Pasalubong (Souvenir)"	Ellen Ongkeko-Marfil	Elen Ocampo	April 25, 1996
Cast: Kristine Garcia, Lito Pimentel, Alicia Alonzo, Archie Adamos, Lora Luna, Carol Banawa, Kristopher Peralta, Agatha Tapan, Val Iglesias, Troy Martino, Manjo del Mundo
54	"Kuwadra (Chord)"	Nick Lizaso	Carmen Cabling	May 1, 1996
Cast: Jestoni Alarcon, Gina Alajar, Vivian Foz, Bembol Roco, Luz Fernandez, Pinky Amador, Archie Adamos, Tom Olivar, Carol Banawa, Alfred Manal, Royce Subido, Anne Villegas, Enrico Salcedo, Berting Labra
55	"Dinuguan"	Rory B. Quintos	Agnes Gagelonia-Uligan	May 2, 1996
Cast: Manilyn Reynes, Sheryl Cruz, Caridad Sanchez, Rico Yan, Eagle Riggs, Cris Daluz, Rey Sagum, Gia Garchitorena

=== Season 5 (1996–1997) ===
#	Episode title	Directed by	Written by	Original air date
1	"Closet"	Michael de Mesa	Ruel S. Bayani	May 9, 1996
Cast: Ricky Davao, Eula Valdez, Kier Legaspi, Jao Mapa, Cris Villanueva, Robert Ortega, Roxy Liquigan, Joseph Pe, Timothy Diwa
2	"Lambat (Net)"	Nick Lizaso	Ina Pozon Bulatao; Mulawin Gerardo Bulatao	May 16, 1996
Cast: Ina Raymundo, Romnick Sarmenta, Ariel Rivera, Nante Montreal
3	"Baston (Cane)"	Rory B. Quintos	Dado C. Lumibao	May 23, 1996
Cast: Eric Quizon, Jamie Rivera, Marita Zobel, Pocholo Montes, Lorenzo Mara
4	"Bahay na Bato"	Jerry Lopez-Sineneng	Shaira Mella-Salvador	May 30, 1996
Cast: Elizabeth Oropesa, Eric Fructuoso, Rica Peralejo, Alicia Alonzo, Dante Rivero, Allan Paule, Nikka Valencia, Korinne Lirio, Christine Alburo, Amiel Leonardia
5	"Gulong (Wheel)"	Ruel S. Bayani	Dado C. Lumibao; Don Michael Perez	June 6, 1996
Cast: Ruffa Gutierrez, Ian Veneracion, Lorli Villanueva, Joy Viado, Berting Labra, Farrah Florer, Jason Javelon, Raffy Alonzo, Ramon Recto
6	"Baul (Chest)"	Rory B. Quintos	Ricky Lee; Mari Mariano	June 13, 1996
Cast: Charo Santos, Coney Reyes, Ricky Belmonte, Nikka Valencia
7	"Mynah"	Manny Castañeda	Carmen Cabling	June 27, 1996
Cast: G. Toengi, Diether Ocampo, Diego Castro, Guila Alvarez, Dexter Doria, Ramil Rodriguez, Marita Zobel
8	"Trapo (Rag)"	Ellen Ongkeko-Marfil	Ellen Ongkeko-Marfil	July 4, 1996
Cast: Janice de Belen, Gardo Versoza, Sylvia Sanchez, Errol Dionisio
9	"Kuwadro (Frame)"	Lupita Aquino-Kashiwahara	Don Michael Perez	July 11, 1996
Cast: Gary Estrada, Marjorie Barretto, Yayo Aguila, Perla Bautista, Alicia Alonzo
10	"Bala (Bullet)"	Michael de Mesa	Bonifacio Ilagan	July 18, 1996
Cast: Kier Legaspi, Anita Linda, Rolando Tinio, Meryll Soriano, Troy Martino
11	"Bisikleta (Bicycle)"	Rory B. Quintos	Don Michael Perez	July 25, 1996
Cast: Mat Ranillo III, Rio Locsin, Karl Angelo Legaspi, Korinne Lirio, Toby Alejar, Lorna Lopez
12	"Kulungan (Cage)"	Rory B. Quintos	Don Michael Perez	August 1, 1996
Cast: Leandro Baldemor, Jeffrey Hidalgo, Richard Quan, Romano Vasquez, Subas Herrero, Lucita Soriano, Nante Montreal, Royce Subido, Gandong Cervantes, JC Tizon, Val Iglesias, Farsaad Mashoufi
13	"Leche Plan"	Khryss Adalia	Keiko Aquino	August 8, 1996
Cast: Jean Garcia, Amy Austria, Juan Rodrigo, Hazel Ann Mendoza, Princess Ann Schuck, Danny Ramos, Imelda Ilanan
14	"Lata (Can)"	Edwin O'Hara	Erick C. Salud	August 15, 1996
Cast: Jennifer Mendoza, Eva Darren, Gloria Sevilla, Allyzon Lualhati, Miya Nolasco, Lawrence David
15	"Manibela (Steering wheel)"	Michael de Mesa	Don Michael Perez	August 29, 1996
Cast: Eula Valdez, Lander Vera-Perez, Tommy Abuel, Nestor de Villa, Caridad Sanchez, Chubi del Rosario
16	"Billiards"	Olivia M. Lamasan	Mari Mariano	September 19, 1996
Cast: G. Toengi, Matthew Mendoza, Kier Legaspi, Jan Marini Alano, Evangeline Pascual, Jean Saburit, Ramil Rodriguez, Romeo Rivera
17	"Ugat (Root)"	Edwin O'Hara	Dado C. Lumibao	September 26, 1996
Cast: Smokey Manaloto, Cris Villanueva, Mikee Villanueva, Aljon Jimenez, Pilar Pilapil, Celia Rodriguez
18	"Karayom (Needle)"	Jerry Lopez-Sineneng	Wali Ching	October 3, 1996
Cast: Jolina Magdangal, Marvin Agustin, Jaclyn Jose, Michael de Mesa, Susan Africa, Pen Medina
19	"Diary"	Gina Alajar	Mel Mendoza-del Rosario	October 10, 1996
Cast: Hilda Koronel, Tirso Cruz III, Rico Yan, AJ Eigenmann, Lailani Navarro, Amabel Quiambao
20	"Dibuho (Sketch)"	Eric Quizon	John-D Lazatin	October 17, 1996
Cast: Carmina Villarroel, Nikka Valencia, Victor Neri, Maggie dela Riva, Nick Lizaso, Ava Grande
21	"Sagwan (Oar)"	Ricky Davao	Wali Ching	October 24, 1996
Cast: Isko Moreno, Jay Manalo, Ronaldo Valdez, Rita Avila, Vivian Foz, Mon Confiado, Kimberly Diaz
22	"Bridal Gown"	Fanny Serrano	Shaira Mella-Salvador	October 31, 1996
Cast: Lorna Tolentino, Amy Austria, Jaclyn Jose, Elizabeth Oropesa, Roderick Paulate, Joel Torre, Isabel Rivas, Maila Gumila, Matthew Mendoza, Tita de Villa, Ramon Recto
23	"Basketball"	Michael de Mesa	Don Michael Perez	November 7, 1996
Cast: Piolo Pascual, Carlos Agassi, Diego Castro, Rica Peralejo, Cheska Garcia, Gio Alvarez, Chanda Romero, Sylvia Sanchez, Romeo Rivera, Ramil Rodriguez, Spanky Manikan, Malou Crisologo, Steven Alonso, Zeus Inocencio, JR Herrera, Hope Matriano
24	"Lubid (Rope)"	Manny Castañeda	Wystan Dimalanta	November 8, 1996
Cast: Gio Alvarez, Gina Alajar, Tommy Abuel, Maricel Morales, Angelica Panganiban, Sherry Lara, Elaine Gil, Arlene Tolibas
25	"Painting"	Joel Torre	Jillmer Dy	November 14, 1996
Cast: Eric Fructuoso, Bojo Molina, Carlo Aquino, Chubi del Rosario, Robert Arevalo, Dante Rivero, Evangeline Pascual, Jacqui Manzano, Rodney Shattara
26	"Guho (Ruin)"	Beverly Vergel	Dado C. Lumibao	November 21, 1996
Cast: Princess Punzalan, Alwyn Uytingco, Eric Quizon, Sheila Ysrael, Mely Tagasa, Ray Ventura, Alma Lerma, Kjell Villamarin
27	"Silver Bells"	Lupita Aquino-Kashiwahara	Carmen Cabling	December 5, 1996
Cast: Romnick Sarmenta, Ina Raymundo, Fredmoore delos Santos, Cris Daluz, Gloria Sevilla, Daniel Neese, Joey Monson, Camille Velasco
28	"Pahiram Ng Isang Pasko (A Christmas Borrow)"	Olivia M. Lamasan	Ricky Lee	December 19, 1996
Cast: Claudine Barretto, Farrah Florer, Kier Legaspi, Rio Locsin, Dante Rivero, Susan Roces, Cris Villanueva
29	"Paputok (Fireworks)"	Gina Marissa Tagasa	Wali Ching	January 2, 1997
Cast: Elizabeth Oropesa, Bembol Roco, Eula Valdez, Spanky Manikan, Manjo del Mundo, Richard Quan, Rubirosa, Mel Kminura, Stefano Mori, Marc Solis, Alysson Luwalhati, Kat de Jesus, Camille Prats
30	"Insurance Policy"	Lupita Kashiwahara	Erick Reyes	January 9, 1997
Cast: Jean Garcia, Emilio Garcia, Maila Gumila, Orestes Ojeda, Ester Chavez, Dante Castro

=== Season 6 (1997–1998) ===
#	Episode title	Directed by	Written by	Original air date
1	"Bituin (Star)"	Joel Torre	Ruel S. Bayani	January 23, 1997
Cast: Diether Ocampo, Charito Solis, Guila Alvarez, Anita Linda, Anne Villegas, Pocholo Montes, Tita de Villa, Alwyn Uytingco, Nikka Peralejo
2	"Baril (Gun)"	Jerry Lopez Sineneng	FM Reyes	January 30, 1997
Cast: Marvin Agustin, Tommy Abuel, Vivan Foz, Bianca Lapus, Cholo Escano, Chubi del Rosario
3	"Tatoo"	Ellen Ongkeko	Carmen Cabling	February 6, 1997
Cast: Elizabeth Oropesa, Lito Legaspi, Kier Legaspi, Tom Olivar, Brando Legaspi, Charlie Davao, Alma Lerma, Mylene Dizon
4	"Lens Cap"	Chito Roño	John D. Lazartin	February 13, 1997
Cast: Kris Aquino, Gary Estrada, Raymond Bagatsing, Lee Robin Salazar
6	"Kubrekama (Quilt)"	Ricky Davao	Don Michael Perez	February 20, 1997
Cast: Spencer Reyes, Gina Alajar, Meryll Soriano, Pen Medina, Susan Africa, Juan Rodrigo, Rubirosa, Jhong Hilario, Meynard Marcellano, Joey Andres, Nico Marcelo, Christopher Cruz
7	"Vodka"	Eric Quizon	Wali Ching	February 27, 1997
Cast: Eric Fructuoso, Wowie de Guzman, Jennifer Sevilla, Gloria Sevilla, Ricky Belmonte, Lailani Navarro
8	"Aquarium"	Gina Alajar	Wali Ching	March 6, 1997
Cast: G. Toengi, Jao Mapa, Diego Castro, Pinky de Leon, Alicia Alonzo, Ramil Rodriguez, Johnny Vicar, Michael Roy Jornales, Hazel Ann Mendoza
9	"Rattle"	Ellen Ongkeko	Agnes Gagelonia	March 20, 1997
Cast: Boots Anson-Roa, Paolo Contis, Angelica Panganiban, Alwyn Uytingco, Lucita Soriano, Luz Fernandez, Louie Manansala
10	"Salbabida (Lifeguard)"	Jerry Lopez Sineneng	Don Michael Perez	April 3, 1997
Cast: Matthew Mendoza, Richard Quan, CJ Ramos, Dante Rivero, Patricia Ann Roque, Sharmaine Suarez
11	"Blueprint"	Khryss Adalia	Senedy Que	April 10, 1997
Cast: Maricel Laxa, Mat Ranillo III, Rosemarie Gil, Jean Garcia, Aljon Jimenez, Marites Samson
12	"Entablado (Stage)"	Lupita Aquino-Kashiwahara	Don Michael Perez	April 17, 1997
Cast: Emman Abeleda, Steven Alonzo, Rita Avila, Lindsay Custodio, Ian de leon, Vanessa del Bianco, Tess Dumpit, Mia Gutierrez, Jeffrey Hidalgo, Sabrina James, Ronnie Lazaro, Pocholo Montes, Dominic Ochoa, Gerard Pizzaras, Ces Quesada, Rodney Shattara, Joel Torre
13	"Dugo (Blood)"	Eddie Rodriguez	Agnes Gagelonia-Uligan	April 24, 1997
Cast: Elizabeth Oropesa, Tommy Abuel, Susan Africa, Vivian Foz, Kier Legaspi, Jan Marini, Farrah Florer
14	"Visa"	Gina Alajar	Senedy Que	May 1, 1997
Cast: Sandy Andolong, Amado Cortez, Julio Diaz, Anna Marin, Hazel Ann Mendoza, Charito Solis, Alwyn Uytingco, Joy Viado
15	"Mangga (Mango)"	Ellen Ongkeko-Marfil	Mari Mariano	May 8, 1997
Cast: Jolina Magdangal, Bojo Molina, Piolo Pascual, Trisha Salvador, JR Herrera
16	"Gitara (Guitar)"	Jerry Lopez Sineneng	Don Michael Perez	May 15, 1997
Cast: Patrick Garcia, Zsa Zsa Padilla, Mat Ranillo III, Evangeline Pascual, Orestes Ojeda, Luigi Alvarez, Kristopher Peralta, Marc Solis, Nikki Valdez, Kristine Hermosa, Miggy Tanchanco, Mel Kimura, Idda Yaneza
17	"Pusod (Navel)"	Fanny Serrano	Agnes Gagelonia-Uligan	May 22, 1997
Cast: Celia Rodriguez, Eula Valdez, Cris Villanueva, Jaclyn Jose, Allan Paule, Onemig Bondoc, Gia Garchitorena, Luz Fernandez
18	"Tubao (Potato)"	Ricky Davao	Ruel S. Bayani	June 5, 1997
Cast: Sharmaine Arnaiz, Pinky de Leon, Romnick Sarmenta, Robert Arevalo, Subas Herrero, Nante Montreal, Lorena Garcia
19	"Diner"	Gina Alajar	Don Michael Perez	June 12, 1997
Cast: Aljon Jimenez, Jennifer Sevilla, Gio Alvarez, Meryll Soriano, Lady Lee, Dominic Ochoa, Carlo Aquino, Lailani Navarro
20	"Bleacher"	Gina Alajar	Gil Alcantara	June 19, 1997
Cast: Jao Mapa, Farrah Florer, Cheska Garcia, Rosemarie Gil, Eddie Mesa, Ricky Belmonte
21	"Bintana (Window)"	Ellen Ongkeko-Marfil	Don Michael Perez	June 26, 1997
Cast: Jolina Magdangal, Marvin Agustin, Jaclyn Jose, Joel Torre, JR Herrera, Joed Serrano, Lee Robin Salazar, Brando Legaspi, Richard Quan, Manjo del Mundo, Troy Martino
22	"Puting Panyo (White Handkerchief)"	Eric Quizon	Wali Ching	July 3, 1997
Cast: Vina Morales, Hilda Koronel, Mat Ranillo III, Isko Moreno, Alicia Alonzo, Eva Darren, Kristine Hermosa, Tom Olivar, Stella Cañete, Sylvia Garde
23	"Traysikel (Tricycle)"	Nick Lizaso	Wali Ching	July 10, 1997
Cast: Manilyn Reynes, Gardo Versoza, Winnie Cordero, Minnie Aguilar, Lorli Villanueva, Idda Yaneza, Cris Daluz, Pocholo Montes, Korrine Lirio, Kien Navarro, Ermie Concepcion, Jake de Asis
24	"Pabango, Lipstik at Tsokolate (Perfume, Lipstick and Chocolate)"	Lupita Aquino-Kashiwahara	Agnes Gagelonia-Uligan	July 17, 1997
Cast: Nida Blanca, Pinky de Leon, Maricel Laxa, Cherry Pie Picache, Lito Legaspi, Amado Cortez, Allan Paule
25	"Wedding Vow"	Ramon Bayron	Boots Plata	July 24, 1997
Cast: Carmina Villarroel, Eric Quizon, Alicia Alonzo, Marita Zobel, Charlie Davao, Vivian Foz, Mia Gutierrez, Cris Michelena, Pocholo Montes, Ama Quiambao, Mae-Ann Adonis, Errol Dionisio
26	"Silong (Basement)"	Wenn V. Deramas	Shaira Mella Salvador	July 31, 1997
Cast: Eva Darren, Rustom Padilla, Jennifer Mendoza, Dante Rivero, Eula Valdez, Johnny Vicar
27	"Liwanag (Light)"	Ellen Ongkeko-Marfil	Don Michael Perez; Carolina Catacutan-Sam	August 14, 1997
Cast: Claudine Barretto, Guila Alvarez, Ronaldo Bertubin, Malou Crisologo, Victoria Haynes, Lito Legaspi, Stefano Mori, Victor Neri, Gina Pareño, Bodjie Pascua, Camille Prats, Dessa Quesada, Joven Velasco, Archie Ventosa, Raquel Villavicencio
28	"Phonograph"	Khryss Adalia	Gil Alcantara	August 21, 1997
Cast: Elizabeth Oropesa, John Estrada, Cita Astals, Raymond Bagatsing, Ermie Concepcion, Lorena Garcia, Olga Natividad, Jean Saburit
29	"Kalawang (Rust)"	Jerry Lopez Sineneng	Don Michael Perez	August 27, 1997
Cast: Eric Fructuoso, Leandro Baldemor, Carlo Aquino, Belinda Cuervo, Michael Roy Jornales, Glydel Mercado, Mikee Villanueva
30	"Piyesa (Component)"	Jerry Lopez Sineneng	FM Reyes	September 4, 1997
Cast: Jericho Rosales, Jennifer Sevilla, Allan Bautista, Julia Clarete, Eva Darren, Korinne Lirio, Lora Luna, Jan Marini, Hazel Ann Mendoza, Stefano Mori, Anne Villegas
31	"Retaso (Slice)"	Lupita Aquino-Kashiwahara	Shaira Mella Salvador	September 9, 1997
Cast: Nora Aunor, Joel Torre, Kaye Abad, Spencer Reyes, Marissa Delgado
32	"Lullaby"	Ramon Bayron	Wenn V. Deramas	September 11, 1997
Cast: Nikki Valdez, Marc Solis, Rio Locsin, Joel Torre, Juan Rodrigo
33	"Kuna (Crib)"	Khryss Adalia	Agnes Gagelonia-Uligan	September 17, 1997
Cast: Angel Aquino, Cherrie Pie Picache, Robert Arevalo, Alicia Alonzo, Richard Quan, Anna Larrucea, Kristopher Peralta, Bong Regala, Lorena Garcia, Alysson Luwalhati, Ronalisa Cheng
34	"Alak (Liquor)"	Olivia Lamasan	Olivia Lamasan	October 2, 1997
Cast: Carmina Villarroel, Raymond Bagatsing, Rosemarie Gil, Ramil Rodriguez, Farrah Florer, Lawrence David, Kristine Hermosa, Miguel dela Rosa, Archie Ventosa
35	"Agua Bendita (Holy Water)"	Jerry Lopez Sineneng	Don Michael Perez	October 16, 1997
Cast: Judy Ann Santos, Rico Yan, Gloria Sevilla, Johnny Vicar, Anne Villegas, Cris Michelena, Raquel Montesa, Cris Daluz, Mel Kimura, Crispin Pineda, Ani Pearl Alonzo, Toni Miran
36	"Agiw (Dust)"	Ruel Santos Bayani	Ruel Santos Bayani; Agnes Gagelona	October 23, 1997
Cast: Gloria Romero, Jackie Lou Blanco, Rita Avila, Lito Pimentel, Jericho Rosales, Lourdes Pla, Rona Cheng, Joy Barrios, Mark Vernal
37	"Anino (Shadow)"	Manny Castañeda	Manny Castañeda	November 6, 1997
Cast: Alma Concepcion, Tommy Abuel, Alona Alegre, Jay Manalo, Spanky Manikan, Raquel Monteza, Eva Darren, Victor Neri
38	"Dolyares (Dollars)"	Elena Ongkeko	Armando Lao	November 9, 1997
Cast: Jaclyn Jose, Princess Punzalan, Angel Aquino, Alicia Alonzo, Allan Paule, Flora Gasser, Ena Garcia
39	"Munting Bituin (Little Star)"	Wenn V. Deramas	Senedy Que	November 13, 1997
Cast: Aiko Melendez, Dante Rivero, Boots Anson-Roa, Diether Ocampo, Robin Da Roza, Miguel Vera, Anne Villegas, Lourdes Pla, Jefferson Long, Carlo Aquino
40	"Manika (Doll)"	Don Miguel Cuaresma	Agnes G. Gagelonia	November 27, 1997
Cast: Jean Garcia, Ricky Davao, Angelica Panganiban, Jan Marini, Gerard Pizzaras, Alan Bautista
41	"Bahay (House)"	Ruel S. Bayani	Mel Mendoza Del Rosario	December 4, 1997
Cast: Smokey Manaloto, Eric Quizon, Eula Valdes, Sharmaine Suarez, Pocholo Montes, Ama Quiambao, Michael Roy Jornales, Korinne Lirio, Alwyn Uytingco, Doods Peralejo
42	"Paper Doll"	Rory B. Quintos	Gil Alcantara; Ramon Bayron	December 18, 1997
Cast: CJ Ramos, Shaina Magdayao, Aljon Jimenez, Angel Aquino, Melissa Mendez, Glenda Garcia, Lito Legaspi, Raquel Monteza, Alfred Manal, Daniel Reyes, Princess Schuck, Marga Madrilejos, Corinne Mendez, Aleli Baguio
43	"Haplos sa Sugat (Nursing Wound)"	Jerry Lopez Sineneng	Don Michael Perez	December 25, 1997
Cast: Charo Santos, Emman Abelada, Tirso Cruz III, Marvin Agustin
44	"Bachelor's Pad"	Ruel S. Bayani	Gil Alcantara	January 15, 1998
Cast: Jennifer Sevilla, Bojo Molina, Alicia Alonzo, Marita Zobel, Dana Revilla, Kathleen Hermosa, Bernard Palanca, Miggy Tanchanco, Diana Enriquez, Gemma Gonzales, Paolo Zobel, Michael Verano, Juan Carlos Castro, Justin Cuyugan, CJ Tolentino
45	"Silbato (Whistle)"	Olivia M. Lamasan	Mari L. Mariano	January 22, 1998
Cast: Joey Marquez, Alma Moreno, John Lloyd Cruz, Berting Labra, Danny Pangolin, Dwight Gaston
46	"Pampang (Shore)"	Rory B. Quintos	Don Michael Perez	February 5, 1998
Cast: Dante Rivero, Boots Anson-Roa, Daria Ramirez, Jericho Rosales, CJ Ramos, Emman Abelada, Alwyn Uytingco, Gino Paul Guzman, Steven Alonzo
47	"Family Room"	Don Michael Cuaresma	Gil Alcantara	February 12, 1998
Cast: Bojo Molina, Eric Fructuoso, Joel Torre, Isabel Rivas, Susan Africa, Dianne dela Fuente, Katrina De Leon
48	"Terminal"	Rory B. Quintos	Don Michael Perez	February 19, 1998
Cast: Gelli de Belen, Cris Villanueva, Kier Legaspi, Alicia Alonzo
49	"Obaryo (Eggs Cell)"	Ruel S. Bayani	Agnes G. Gagelonia	February 26, 1998
Cast: Hilda Koronel, Patrick Garcia, Jon Santos, Lui Villaruz
50	"Jeepney"	Jerry Lopez Sineneng	Gil Alcantara	March 5, 1998
Cast: Gina Pareño, Angelika Dela Cruz, Joy Viado, Dominic Ochoa, Tanya Garcia, Lourdes Pla, Tita de Villa, JR Garcia
51	"Pabaon (Provision)"	Ruel S. Bayani	Ricky Lee	March 12, 1998
Cast: Janice de Belen, John Estrada, Pen Medina, Tom Taus, Connie Chua, Mel Kimura
52	"Sibuyas (Onion)"	Don Miguel Cuaresma	Don Michael Perez	March 19, 1998
Cast: Rita Avila, Raymond Bagatsing, Boots Anson-Roa, Eula Valdez, Ray Ventura, Dexter Doria, Glenda Garcia, Crispin Pineda, Ronalisa Cheng, Nica Peralejo, Iwi Nicholas, Maureen Mauricio, John Apacible
53	"Aklat (Book)"	Olivia M. Lamasan	Lualhati Bautista	March 26, 1998
Cast: Cherry Pie Picache, Kaye Abad, Kathleen Hermosa, Alan Bautista, Jefferson Long, Alwyn Uytingco, Korinne Lirio, Joehardy Alex Toledo
54	"Sugat (Wound)"	Jerry Lopez Sineneng	Don Michael Perez; Ramon Bayron	April 2, 1998
Cast: Jennifer Sevilla, Spencer Reyes, Gloria Sevilla, Vhong Navarro, Ernie Zarate, Tita de Villa, Connie Chua, Mel Kimura, Lora Luna, Lucita Soriano, Cris Daluz, Nante Montreal, Carlo Aquino, Ena Garcia
55	"Pipa (Pipe)"	Ruel S. Bayani	Shaira Mella Salvador	April 16, 1998
Cast: Nida Blanca, Nestor de Villa, Paolo Contis, Teresa Loyzaga, Marita Zobel, Toby Alejar, Carol Banawa, Roy Rodrigo, Archie Ventoza
56	"Jigsaw Puzzle"	Ruel S. Bayani	Ramon Bayron	April 23, 1998
Cast: Sharmaine Arnaiz, Elizabeth Oropesa, Bembol Roco, Baron Geisler, Laura Hermosa, Karl Angelo Legaspi, Korinne Liro
57	"Boy Shoes"	Don Miguel Cuaresma	Agnes Gagelonia	April 30, 1998
Cast: Eula Valdez, Beth Tamayo, Victor Neri, Sharmaine Suarez, Yayo Aguila, Gina Pareño, Lito Legaspi, Marianne dela Riva, Corinne Mendez, Jackie Castillejo
58	"Extra"	Rory B Quintos	Don Michael Perez	May 7, 1998
Cast: Diether Ocampo, Sharmaine Arnaiz, Ricky Belmonte, Raquel Monteza, Pocholo Montes, Monina Bagatsing, Denise Joaquin, Rad Dominguez
59	"Munggo (Mung bean)"	Olivia M. Lamasan	Olivia M. Lamasan; Ramon Bayron; Don Michael Perez	May 14, 1998
Cast: Tommy Abuel, Jericho Rosales, CJ Ramos, Stefano Mori, Marita Zobel, Anita Linda, Vivian Foz, Minnie Aguilar, Julia Clarete, Bernard Palanca, Lui Manasala, Ronaldo Valdez
60	"Shades"	Ruel S. Bayani	Ruel S. Bayani; Don Michael Perez	May 21, 1998
Cast: Rico Yan, Boots Anson-Roa, Gerard Pizzaras, Farrah Florer, Anna Larrucea, Teresa Loyzaga, Ernie Zarate, Don Laurel, Miguel De La Rosa, Paolo Zobel, Diana Enriquez, Aleli Bagio
61	"Bahay-bahayan (Pretend-house)"	Don Miguel Cuaresma	Don Michael Perez; Gil Alcantara	June 4, 1998
Cast: Rica Peralejo, Dominic Ochoa, Rez Cortez, Dick Israel, Malou de Guzman, Ces Quesada, John Lapus, Karl Angelo Legapsi, Pupi Pla, Arman de Guzman
62	"Talaarawan (Diary)"	Olivia Lamasan	Lualhati Bautista; Don Michael Perez	June 11, 1998
Cast: Eula Valdez, Michael de Mesa, Gardo Versoza, Glenda Garcia, Perla Bautista, William Lorenzo, Cris Daluz, Stefano Mori, Connie Chua

=== Season 7 (1998–1999) ===
#	Episode title	Directed by	Written by	Original air date
1	"Gitara"	Wenn Deramas	Don Michael Perez	July 2, 1998
Cast: Jolina Magdangal, Alwyn Uytingco, Ray Ventura, Gina Pareño, Rad Dominguez, Johnny Vicar
2	"Karne"	Ricky Lee	Don Cuaresma	July 9, 1998
Cast: Marvin Agustin, Mon Confiado, Ricky Davao, Arman De Guzman, Aurora Halili, Jaclyn Jose, Anna Larrucea, Tom Olivar
3	"Voice Tape"	Ruel S. Bayani	Ramon Bayron; Don Michael Perez	July 16, 1998
Cast: Sunshine Cruz, Sylvia Sanchez, Noel Trinidad, Raymond Bagatsing, Charity Walthrop, Liza Oldham, Pauline Meeker, Mariebelle Auborb, Michael Murphy, Jim Mosh, Kevin Isherwood
4	"Car Trunk"	Nick Lizaro	Gil Alcantara; Don Michael Perez	July 30, 1998
Cast: Ian De Leon, Jennifer Sevilla, Ronalisa Cheng, Pinky Amador, Miguel De La Rosa, Alvin Anson, Charlie Davao, Marita Zobel, Lucita Soriano, Andrea Del Rosario, Diana Enriquez, BJ de Jesus
5	"Pasa"	Don Miguel Cuaresma	Mel Mendoza Del Rosario	August 6, 1998
Cast: Jackie Lou Blanco, Edu Manzano, Dan Fernandez, Cherry Pie Picache, Shaina Magdayao
6	"Sketch"	Don Miguel Cuaresma	Lualhati Bautista	August 13, 1998
Cast: Hilda Koronel, Dante Rivero, Chin-Chin Gutierrez, Teresa Loyzaga, Raquel Villavicencio, Richard Quan
7	"Balloon"	Ruel S. Bayani	Shaina Mella Salvador	August 20, 1998
Cast: Maricel Laxa, Eric Quizon, Serena Dalrymple, Sharmaine Suarez, Eva Darren, Candy Pangilinan, Mai-Mai Davao, Jessie Diaz
8	"Jukebox"	Wenn V. Deramas	Gil Alcantara; Don Michael Perez	September 3, 1998
Cast: Ester Chavez, Allen Dizon, Hazel Espinosa, Ara Mina, Mosang, Ray Ventura, Gardo Versoza
9	"Typewriter"	Ricky Davao	Ricky Lee; Don Michael Perez	September 10, 1998
Cast: Yayo Aguila, Carlo Aquino, Cita Astals, Ricky Davao, Malou de Guzman, Andrei Felix, Daniel Fernando, Vivian Foz, Jean Garcia, Leo Rabago, Eula Valdez
10	"Paru-Parong Itim"	Don Cuaresma	Jun Lana; Don Michael Perez	September 17, 1998
Cast: Alma Concepcion, John Lloyd Cruz, Raquel Montesa, Manjo Del Mundo, Richard Bonnin, Carol Banawa, Flora Gasser, Ruby Rosa
11	"Steps"	Gilbert G. Perez	Gil Alcantara	September 24, 1998
Cast: Sunshine Cruz, Harlene Bautista, Boom Labrusca, Mandy Ochoa, Nante Montreal, Miguel dela Rosa, Gerry Oliva, Randolph Ranay
12	"Kinky Hair"	Jerry Lopez Sineneng	Don Michael Perez; Nick Pichay	October 2, 1998
Cast: Kaye Abad, Gina Alajar, Michael de Mesa, Angelica Panganiban, Andrei Felix, Mel Kimura, Glenda Garcia, Rodney Shattara
13	"Kanto Girl"	Ruel S. Bayani	Don Michael Perez	October 15, 1998
Cast: Mylene Dizon, Subas Herrero, John Lapus, Don Laurel, Troy Montero, Jean Saburit
14	"Family Tree"	Wenn V. Deramas	Carmen Cabling	October 22, 1998
Cast: Princess Punzalan, Rustom Padilla, Cherry Pie Picache, Perla Bautista, CJ Ramos, Loren Garcia, Maureen Mauricio, Eugene Domingo, Carlos Morales
15	"Shoebox"	Ruel S. Bayani	Don Michael Perez	October 29, 1998
Cast: Victor Neri, Bojo Molina, Romeo Rivera, Denise Joaquin, Wilson Go, Len Ag-Santos, Brandon Ramirez, Francis Flores, Tessie Tomas
16	"Siato"	Gilbert Perez	Gil M. Alcantara	November 5, 1998
Cast: Carlo Aquino, Stefano Mori, John Prats, Alfred Manal, Gerard Pizzaras, Piolo Pascual, Romano Vasquez, Steven Alonzo, Suzette Ranillo, Ama Quiambao, Dandin Ranillo, Jessie Diaz, Norman Hernandez, Antonio Cordedda, Rio Locsin
17	"Gulong"	Ruel S. Bayani	Dado M. Lumibao	November 19, 1998
Cast: Robert Arevalo, Boots Anson-Roa, Pinky De Leon, Romnick Sarmenta, Spencer Reyes
18	"Kopita"	Jerry Lopez Sineneng	Don Michael Perez	November 26, 1998
Cast: January Isaac Bodlovic, Luz Fernandez, William Lorenzo, Jan Marini, Lito Pimentel, Mat Ranillo III, Caridad Sanchez, Ray Ventura, Gardo Versoza, Ernie Zarate, Marita Zobel
19	"Desaparesidos"	Jerry Lopez Sineneng	Ricky Lee; Don Michael Perez	December 10, 1998
Cast: Jacklyn Jose, Claudine Barretto, Camille Prats, Susan Africa, John Arcilla, Gio Alvarez, Junell Hernando, Miguel dela Rosa, Jessie Diaz
20	"Family Album"	Don Cuaresma	Don Michael Perez	December 24, 1998
Cast: Nida Blanca, Nestor de Villa, Rita Avila, Jennifer Mendoza, Ramil Rodriguez, Allan Paule, Leandro Baldemor, Dominic Ochoa, Ronalisa Cheng, Benjie Valdez
21	"Tulay"	Gilbert Perez	Gil Alcantara	January 4, 1999
Cast: Carlo Aquino, January Isaac Bodlovic, Timmy Cruz, Dan Fernandez, Kier Legaspi, Aya Medel, Victor Neri, John Prats, Gilleth Sandico
22	"Selda"	Don Cuaresma	Shaina Mella Salvador	January 7, 1999
Cast: Tirso Cruz III, Elizabeth Oropesa, Wowie de Guzman, Julia Clarete, Ray Ventura, Sharmaine Suarez, Lucita Soriano, Val Iglesias, John Apacible
23	"Origami"	Ruel S. Bayani	Jun Lana; John Lapus; Don Michael Perez	January 14, 1999
Cast: Cherry Pie Picache, Joel Torre, Nikki Valdez, Alwyn Uytingco, Stella Ruiz, Mia Gutierrez, Jackie Castillejos
24	"Video Cam"	Khryss Adalia	Carmen Cabling	January 28, 1999
Cast: Guila Alvarez, Ricky Davao, Flora Gasser, Boy 2 Quizon, Mat Ranillo III, Tina Revilla, Aiza Seguerra, Chat Silayan
25	"Sulat"	Rory B. Quintos	Jun Lana; John Lapus; Don Michael Perez	January 31, 1999
Cast: Bojo Molina, Jericho Rosales, Sharmaine Arnaiz, Angelika Dela Cruz, Jean Saburit, Marita Zobel, Chinggoy Alonzo
26	"Rehas"	Lupita Aquino-Kashiwahara	Lualhati Bautista; Don Michael Perez	February 4, 1999
Cast: Helen Gamboa, Robert Arevalo, Kier Legaspi, Yayo Aguila, Eva Darren, Romeo Rivera, Allen Dizon, Paolo Zobel, Anna May Baquirin
27	"Panakot-Uwak"	Jeffrey Jeturian	Carmen Cabling	February 11, 1999
Cast: Ina Raymundo, Zoren Legaspi, Ian De Leon, Rosemarie Gil
28	"Ampon"	Don Cuaresma	Ricky Lee	February 25, 1999
Cast: Boots Anson-Roa, Raymond Bagatsing, Serena Dalrymple, Wowie de Guzman, Candy Pangilinan, Eagle Riggs
29	"Puno"	Ruel Bayani	Dado Lumibao	March 4, 1999
Cast: Dante Rivero, Noel Trinidad, Mark Gil, Amy Perez, John Lloyd Cruz, Vivian Foz
30	"Photo ID"	Ellen Ongkeko	Nanette Matilac	March 11, 1999
Cast: Gina Pareño, Dominic Ochoa, Pen Medina, Celia Rodriguez, Aurora Halili, Allen Dizon, Marcus Madrigal, Corrine Mendez, Archie Ventosa, Michael Verano, Nimrod Fernando, Jess Everdone, Joven Velasco
31	"Nazareno"	Erick M. Reyes	Dado C. Lumibao	March 25, 1999
Cast: Cherry Pie Picache, Carlo Aquino, Romnick Sarmenta, Eva Darren, Alicia Alonzo
32	"Stethoscope"	Ruel S. Bayani	Dado Lumibao	April 8, 1999
Cast: Carmina Villarroel, Pinky De Leon, Bembol Roco, Matthew Mendoza, Veronica Peralejo
33	"Piano"	Don M. Cuaresma	Dado C. Lumibao	April 15, 1999
Cast: Jennifer Sevilla, Mylene Dizon, Joel Torre, Piolo Pascual, Marianne dela Riva, Patrick Guzman, Meynard Miguel
34	"Lollipop"	Cathy Garcia-Sampana	Gil Alcantara	April 29, 1999
Cast: Boots Anson-Roa, Ronalisa Cheng, Ian De Leon, Tess Dumpit, Victoria Hayes, Vina Morales, Iwi Nicholas, Veronica Peralejo, Camille Prats, Richard Quan, Robert Seña, Ray Ventura, Gamaliel Viray
35	"Sinehan"	Gilbert G. Perez	Mel del Rosario	May 13, 1999
Cast: John Prats, CJ Ramos, Mark Gil, Sylvia Sanchez, Efren Reyes Jr., Sharmaine Suarez, Janus del Prado, Kathleen Hermosa, Jessie Diaz
36	"Taxi"	Don Cuaresma	Gil Alcantara	May 20, 1999
Cast: Noel Colet, Mel Kimura, Kalvin Legaspi, Zoren Legaspi, Hazel Ann Mendoza, Raquel Monteza, Carmina Villarroel
37	"Kundiman"	FM Reyes	Dado C. Lumibao	June 3, 1999
Cast: Helen Gamboa, Dante Rivero, Kier Legaspi, Cris Villanueva, Nikki Valdez, Kristine Hermosa, Nikka Valencia, Victoria Haynes, John Wayne Sace
38	"Kalsada"	Jerry Lopez-Sineneng	Ramon Bayron	June 10, 1999
Cast: Gary Estrada, Daisy Reyes, Ana Capri, Raquel Villavicencio, Spanky Manikan, Crispin Pineda, Dennis Baltazar, Joseph Pe, Joel Saracho
39	"Pulot-Gata"	Gilbert Perez	Gil Alcantara	June 17, 1999
Cast: Ricky Davao, Jean Garcia, Tonton Gutierrez, Charlie Davao, Veronica Peralejo

=== Season 8 (1999–2000) ===
#	Episode title	Directed by	Written by	Original air date
1	"Oto San"	Olivia M. Lamasan	Ricky Lee	July 1, 1999
Cast: Jiro Manio, Gardo Versoza, Cherry Pie Picache, Emilio Garcia, Allan Bautista, Cris Daluz
2	"Forcep"	Gil Alcantara	Wenn D. Deramas	July 8, 1999
Cast: Monina Bagasting, Nida Blanca, Dexter Doria, Anita Linda, Pocholo Montes, Leandro Muñoz, Gerard Pizarras
3	"Friendship Band"	Lupita A. Kashiwahara	Wali Cheng	July 22, 1999
Cast: Kaye Abad, Jericho Rosales, Lara Fabregas, Carlo Muñoz, Orestes Ojeda, Mia Gutierrez, Joanna Isidro, Allen Dizon, Andrea del Rosario
4	"Kape"	Ruel S. Bayani	Dado C. Lumibao	July 29, 1999
Cast: Albert Martinez, John Prats, Pupi Pla, Junell Hernando, Jefferson Long, Wilson Go, Celia Rodriguez
5	"Karnabal"	Jerry Lopez Sineneng	Mel Mendoza-Del Rosario	August 5, 1999
Cast: Judy Ann Santos, Wowie de Guzman, Vivian Foz, Jesus Olmedo, Arnel Bering, Jan Marini, Don Laurel, Denise Joaquin, Jennifer Illustre, Alma Lerma, Ama Quiambao
6	"Medalya"	Ricky Davao	Senedy Que	August 8, 1999
Cast: Eddie Garcia, Rico Yan, Alicia Alonzo, Susan Africa, Spanky Maniban, Jan Marini Alano, MyMy Davao
7	"Baril-barilan"	Ruel S. Bayani	Ronald Carballo	August 12, 1999
Cast: Ernie Concepcion, Anita Linda, William Lorenzo, Ariel Rivera, Chanda Romero, Fanny Serano
8	"Gasera"	Wenn V. Deramas	Ronald Carballo	August 19, 1999
Cast: Janice De Belen, Anna Feliciano, Glenda Garcia, Lorena Garcia, Tonton Gutierrez, Mike Marat, Lee Robin Salazar, Ray Ventura
9	"Harang-taga"	Wenn V, Deramas	Gil Alcantara	August 26, 1999
Cast: Danilo Barrios, Malou De Guzman, Eugene Domingo, Dick Israel, Elizabeth Oropesa, Spencer Reyes, Dimples Romana, Jodi Sta. Maria
10	"Regalo"	Gilbert Perez	Dado C. Lumibao	September 2, 1999
Cast: Carmina Villarroel, Eva Darren, Alice Dixson, Mel Kimura, Kalvin Legaspi, Mandy Ochoa, Lander Vera-Perez
11	"Saplot"	Chito S. Roño	Dado C. Lumibao	September 16, 1999
Cast: Melissa Avelino, Rez Cortez, Janus Del Prado, Diether Ocampo, Rica Peralejo, Cherry Pie Picache, Jean Saburit, Empress Schuck, Angela Velez
12	"Wedding Cake"	John-D Lazatin	Gil Alcantara	October 7, 1999
Cast: Jhong Hilario, Rustom Padilla, Raymond Bagatsing, Patricia Javier, Jaime Fabregas, Mel Martinez, Vhong Navarro, Mel Kimura, Danilo Barrios, Benjie Valdez
13	"Ambulansya"	Don Cuaresma	Dado Lumibao	October 21, 1999
Cast: Rosa Rosal, Armando Goyena, Bella Flores, Chat Silayan-Bailon, Maila Gumila, Denise Joaquin, Onemig Bondoc
14	"Red Couch"	Ruel S. Bayani	Gil Alcantara	October 28, 1999
Cast: Bobby Andrews, Lara Fabregas, Tracy Vergel, Allen Dizon, Mark Wilson
15	"Tula"	Erick M. Reyes	Marylyn Makpig; Gil Alcantara; FM Reyes	November 11, 1999
Cast: Jacklyn Jose, Dante Rivero, Bojo Molina, Keempee De Leon, Alessandra Da Rossi, Stefano Mori
16	"Palabas" "Movie Fan"	Ruel S. Bayani	Keiko Aquino	November 25, 1999
Cast: Ramon Christopher, Lotlot De Leon, Earl Ignacio, Dick Israel, Hazel Ann Mendoza, Iwi Nicholas, Tessie Tomas, Nova Villa
17	"Ward 24"	Ruel S. Bayani	Dado S. Lumibao	December 2, 1999
Cast: Gina Alajar, Joel Torre, Chinggoy Alonzo, Richard Quan, Katrina Nzario, Aiko Melendez
18	"Inakay"	Lupita Aquino-Kashiwahara	Dado C. Luminal; FM Reyes	December 9, 1999
Cast: Emman Abeleda, Angelo Caangay, Cris Daluz, Niña De Sagun, Julio Diaz, Mia Guttierez, Hilda Koronel, Roselito Lasala, Veronica Peralejo, Benjie Valdez, Ray Ventura
19	"Wristwatch"	Wenn V. Deramas	Wenn V. Deramas	December 16, 1999
Cast: Roderick Paulate, Tonton Gutierrez, Eula Valdez, Perla Bautista, William Lorenzo, John Lapus, Roxy Liquigan, Andoy Ranay, Mark Wilson
20	"Tala ng Lahar"	Jerry Lopez Sineneng	Gil Alcantara; FM Reyes	December 23, 1999
Cast: Princess Punzalan, Wowie de Guzman, Ernie Zarate, Jessie Diaz, Clarissa Chongco, Laurice Guillen
21	"Abito"	Don Cuaresma	FM Reyes; Mel Mendoza-Del Rosario	January 6, 2000
Cast: Carmina Villaroel, Bembol Roco, Chanda Romero, Dominic Ochoa, Cris Villanueva, Aurora Halili
22	"Espada"	Wenn V. Deramas	Ronald Carballo	January 20, 2000
Cast: Marvin Agustin, Ermie Concepcion, Eugene Domingo, Edna Mae Landicho, Maureen Larrazabal, Rufus Morellos, Leandro Muñoz, Crispin Pineda, Efren Reyes, Juan Rodrigo
23	"Plane Ticket"	Wenn V. Deramas	Dado C. Lumibao	February 10, 2000
Cast: Toby Alejar, Ronalisa Cheng, Andrei Felix, Norman Hernandez, Gary Israel, Michael Roy Jornales, Jovie Long, Allyson Lualhati, Piolo Pascual, Mat Ranillo III, Ina Raymundo, Rodney Shattara, Lyka Ugarte
24	"Life Story Book"	Don Cuaresma	Mel Mendoza del Rosario	February 17, 2000
Cast: Gina Pareño, Serena Dalrymple, Melissa Santiago, Tommy Abuel, Marianne dela Riva, Daniel Fernando, Julia Clarete, Kathleen Hermosa, Dimples Romana, Hannah Camille Bustillos
25	"Pedal"	Don Cuaresma	Shaira Mella Salvador	March 2, 2000
Cast: Amy Austria, Angelu De Leon, Ian De Leon, Allen Dizon, Simon Ibarra, Berting Labra, Ray Ventura
26	"Sugal"	Don Cuaresma	Keiko Aquino; Ricky Lee; Jojo Nones	March 4, 2000
Cast: Troy Montero, Princess Punzulan, Gladys Reyes, Joy Viado
27	"Peanut Butter"	Wenn V. Deramas	Gil Alcantara	March 9, 2000
Cast: Roldan Aquino, Danilo Barrios, Angie Castrence, Chie Concepcion, John Lloyd Cruz, Cris Daluz, Malou De Guzman, Desiree De Valle, Dexter Doria, Dick Israel, Candy Pangilinan, Tiya Pusit
28	"Mall"	Rory B. Quintos	Ricky Lee; Dado C. Lumibao	March 18, 2000
Cast: Karlina Bayot, Joey Galvez, Patrick Garcia, Anna Laruccea, Kristopher Peralta, Romeo Rivera, Lander Vera-Perez, Marita Zobel
29	"Kubo"	FM Reyes	Dado C. Lumibao	March 23, 2000
Cast: Perla Bautista, Mymy Davao, Gary Estrada, John Lapus, Jennifer Sevilla, Eula Valdez
30	"Pilat"	Jerry Lopez Sineneng	Ricky Lee; Dado C. Lumibao	April 27, 2000
Cast: Manny Castañeda, Spencer Reyes, Jodi Sta. Maria, Gardo Versoza
31	"Hagdan"	Wenn V. Deramas	Ricky Lee; Rondel Lindayag	May 11, 2000
Cast: Boots Anson-Roa, Jade Capalad, Ana Capri, Pipo Cifra, Eugene Domingo, Antoinette Garcia, Jojit Lorenzo, Tricia Okada, Jennifer Sevilla, Ronaldo Valdez, Cris Villanueva
32	"Keyboard"	Don Cuaresma	Ricky Lee; Dado C. Lumibao	May 18, 2000
Cast: Emman Abelada, Sharmaine Arnaiz, Clarissa Chongco, Tonton Gutierrez, Laura Hermosa, Sharmaine Suarez
33	"Apples, Oranges and Bananas"	Jerry Lopez Sineneng	Gil Alcantara	May 25, 2000
Cast: Bernadette Allyson, Alicia Alonzo, Keempee De Leon, Lovely Rivero, Tracey Vergel, Mark Angelo Wilson
34	"Boses"	Rory B. Quintos	Dado C. Lumibao	June 8, 2000
Cast: Susan Africa, John Arcilla, Phillip Lazaro, Corinne Lirio, Akira Mamato, Pocholo Montes, Vina Morales, Manilyn Reyes, Patricia Ann Roque
35	"Pasa"	Trina N. Dayrit	Dado C. Lumibao	June 15, 2000
Cast: Amy Austria, Janus Del Prado, Johnny Delgado, Marc Garaban, Jiro Manio, Rocky Martinez, Jericho Rosales, Miko Samson
36	"Rehas"	Olivia M. Lamasan	Ricky Lee; Semedy Que	June 22, 2000
Cast: Kirby De Jesus, Laurice Guillen, Reuben Manahan, Hazel Ann Mendoza, Carlo Muñoz, Rica Peralejo, Efren Reyes Jr., Ruby Rosa, Al Tantay, Tessie Villarama
37	"Kalesa"	Rory B. Quintos	Dado C. Lumibao	June 24, 2000
Cast: Cherry Pie Picache, John Prats, CJ Ramos, Mark Wilson, Missy King, Ruby Rosa, Empress Schuck, BJ De Jesus, Angelo Fernandez, John Regala

=== Season 9 (2000–2001) ===
#	Episode title	Directed by	Written by	Original air date
1	"Fairy Tale Book"	Don Cuaresma	Ricky Lee; Gina Marissa Tagasa	July 6, 2000
Cast: Alicia Alonzo, Hannah Camille Bustillos, Ronalisa Cheng, Emilio Garcia, Maricel Laxa, Cherry Pie Picache, Eric Quizon, Gigette Reyes
2	"Sako"	Don Cuaresma	Mel Mendoza-Del Rosario	July 13, 2000
Cast: Gina Alajar, Rosa Rosal, Melisse Santiago, Lester Llansang, Rez Cortez, Archie Adamos, Ruby Rosa, Princess Schuck, Missy King, Steven Alonso, Dianne dela Fuente
3	"Apron"	John D-Lazatin	Ricky Lee; Marilyn Makipig	July 20, 2000
Cast: Jolina Magdangal, Bella Flores, Rochelle Barrameda, Malou De Guzman, Jojit Lorenzo, Gino Paul Guzman, Mosang, Nanette Inventor, Baby O'Brien, Laura Hermosa
4	"Mansanas"	Rory B. Quintos	Dado C. Lumibao	August 3, 2000
Cast: Tonton Gutierrez, Glydel Mercado, Evangeline Pascual, Ama Quimbao, Noel Colet, Maureen Larazabal, Justin Nibres, Charisse Banez, John Vincent Baclig
5	"Postcard"	Mel Chionglo	Ricky Lee; Gilbeys Sardea	August 10, 2000
Cast: Perla Bautista, Cherie Gil, Armando Goyena, Mico Palanca, Gigette Reyes, Zoe Zamora
6	"Maskara"	Rory B. Quintos	Dado C. Lumibao	August 13, 2000
Cast: Mylene Dizon, Gino Paul Guzman, John Lapus, Hazel Ann Mendoza, Daria Ramirez, Angela Velez
7	"Mga Hibla ng Buhok"	FM Reyes	Ricky Lee; Mel Mendoza-Del Rosario	August 24, 2000
Cast: Jet Alcantara, Angelo Caangay, Marick Dacanay, Serena Dalrymple, Ryan Galvez, Patrick Garcia, Rio Locsin, Joel Torre, Anne Villegas
8	"Scrapbook"	Wenn V. Deramas	Vincent Kua; Ricky Lee	September 7, 2000
Cast: Cris Daluz, Albert Martinez, Carlo Muñoz, Tiya Pusit, Eula Valdez, Mark Angelo Wilson
9	"Wedding Ring"	Jerry Lopez Sineneng	Anna Alaan; Ben Cho; Ricky Lee	September 14, 2000
Cast: Alicia Alonzo, Raymond Bagatsing, Jacklyn Jose, Marita Zobel
10	"Paragos"	Don Cuaresma	Maribel Ilag; Ricky Lee	September 21, 2000
Cast: Eva Darren, Dick Israel, Carlos Morales, Dominic Ochoa, Rodel Velayo, Abby Viduya, Lui Villaruz
11	"Tirador"	Wenn V. Deramas	Anna Alaan	September 28, 2000
Cast: Jet Alcantara, Ian Galliguez, Eddie Garcia, Bryan Homecillo, Simon Ibarra, Mona Lisa, Gina Pareño, Sheila Mae Rodriguez
12	"Larawan"	Don Cuaresma	Benedict Mique	October 12, 2000
Cast: Julia Clarete, Mymy Davao, Alice Dixson, Julio Pacheco, John Wayne Sace, Lucita Soriano, Ian Veneracion
13	"Tahanan"	Jerry Lopez Sineneng	Benedict Mique	October 26, 2000
Cast: Mining Borlaza, Ermie Concepcion, Eva Darren, Michael Flores, Gino Paul Guzman, William Lorenzo, Crispin Pineda, Celia Rodriguez, Ray Ventura
14	"Burger Joint"	John-D Lazatin	Ricky Lee; Gilbeys Sardea	November 9, 2000
Cast: Kaye Abad, John Lloyd Cruz, Jhong Hilario, Marc Solis, Lorna Lopez, Apreal Tolentino, Dianne dela Fuente, Gino Paul Guzman, Jess Evardone, Gigi Locsin
15	"Holen"	Don Cuaresma	Mel Mendoza-Del Rosario	November 16, 2000
Cast: Elizabeth Oropesa, Vic Vargas, Gardo Versoza, Berting Labra, Malou de Guzman
16	"Byulin"	Mel Chiongo	Benedict Mique	November 26, 2000
Cast: Boots Anson-Roa, Jaime Fabregas, Farrah Florer, Aurora Halili, Rannie Raymundo, Ariel Rivera, Alwyn Uytingco, Aurora Yumul
17	"Regalo"	John D-Lazatin	Benedict Mique	December 7, 2000
Cast: Kenji Motoki, Rosa Rosal, Jennifer Sevilla, Noel Trinidad, Lyka Urgarte
18	"Parol"	Don Cuaresma	Gina Marissa Tagasa	December 14, 2000
Cast: Mymy Davao, Michael De Mesa, Emilio Garcia, Patrick Garcia, Vangie Labalan, Ronnie Lazaro, Justin Nibres, Sylvia Sanchez
19	"Cellphone"	Lupita Aquino-Kashiwahara	Ronald Carballo	December 21, 2000
Cast: Rita Avila, Cris Daluz, Janus Del Prado, Tanya Garcia, Zsa Zsa Padilla, Crispin Pineda, Al Tantay
20	"Piggy Bank"	Gilbert Perez	Emmanuel Dela Cruz; Melchor Escarcha	December 28, 2000
Cast: Susan Africa, Lei Atienza, Serena Dalrymple, Johnny Delgado, Eugene Domingo, Lui Villaruz
21	"Jigsaw Puzzle"	Trina N. Dayrit	Kye Carlos; Mel Mendoza-Del Rosario; Benedict Mique	January 11, 2001
Cast: Minnie Aguilar, Raye Baquirin, Kwenby Eleazar, BB Gandanghari, Maricel Laxa, Jojit Lorenzo, Glydel Mercado, Angelica Panganiban, Elaine Quemuel, Sharmaine Suarez
22	"Kadena"	Wenn V. Deramas	Ricky Lee	January 25, 2001
Cast: Ana Capri, Ryan Eigenmann, Karla Estrada, Bryan Homecillo, Mike Lloren, Princess Punzulan, Dante Rivero
23	"Sapatos"	Don Cuaresma	Mel Mendoza-Del Rosario	February 1, 2001
Cast: Marvin Agustin, Toby Alejar, Nanette Inventor, Suzette Ranillo, Tessie Tomas, Nikka Valencia, Tessie Villarama, Idda Yaneza
24	"Rositas"	Jerome Chavez Pobocan	Rhoda Sulit	February 15, 2001
Cast: Hilda Koronel, Kristopher Peralta, Cherry Pie Picache, Gerard Pizzaras, Gigette Reyes, Juan Rodrigo, Jodi Sta. Maria
25	"Dyaryo at Robot"	John D-Lazatin	Benedict Mique	February 22, 2001
Cast: Marianne de la Riva, Lotlot De Leon, Ian Galliguez, Simon Ibarra, Jiro Manio, Orestes Ojeda, Ray Ventura
26	"Aling Mameng"	Joel Lamangan	Delfin Ilao	March 1, 2001
Cast: Irma Adlawan, Tin Arnaldo, Amy Austria, Bernardo Bernardo, Angie Castrence, Eva Darren, Bing Davao, Don Laurel, Lester Llansang, Mike Lloren, Nante Montreal, Jim Pebanco, Rosa Rosal
27	"Junk Shop"	Don Cuaresma	Benedict Mique	March 15, 2001
Cast: Gina Pareño, Jake Roxas, Ching Arellano, Vhong Navarro, Jhong Hilario, Berting Labra, Irma Adlawan, Farrah Florer
28	"US Visa"	John D-Lazatin	Ricky Lee; Mel Mendoza-Del Rosario	March 21, 2001
Cast: Rufa Mae Quinto, Jay Manalo, Caridad Sanchez, Malou De Guzman, Wilma Doesnt, Don Stockwell, Daniel Pasia, Kalila Aguilos
29	"Baras"	Don Cuaresma	Mel Mendoza-Del Rosario	March 29, 2001
Cast: Adrian Alandy, John Arcilla, Blair Arellano, Jessie Diaz, Kathleen Hermosa, Angelo Muñoz, Ama Quiambao, CJ Ramos, Chandra Romero, Sylvia Sanchez, Alwyn Uytingco
30	"Birth Certificate"	Jerome Chavez Pobocan	Rhoda Sulit; Arlene Tamayo	April 5, 2001
Cast: Khryss Adalia, Nonoy Barabicho, Keempee De Leon, Inday Garutay, Mel Kimura, Gerald Madrid, Manilyn Reyes
31	"Kapirasong Papel"	Cathy Garcia-Sampana	Henry King Quitain	April 19, 2001
Cast: Chinggoy Alonzo, Chie Concepcion, Paolo Contis, Chris Cruz, Pinky De Leon, Patrick Garcia, Sergio Garcia, Gigi Locsin, Lui Manansala, Joseph Olfindo, Gigette Reyes, Idda Yaneza
32	"Blusa"	John-D Lazatin	Mel-Mendoza Del Rosario	April 26, 2001
Cast: Klaudia Koronel, Janette McBride, Rafael Rosal, Bunggoy Manahan, Patricia Ismael, Gino Paul Guzman, Sheila Mae Rodriguez
33	"Waiting Shed"	Erick C. Salud	Ben Cho; Benedict Mique	May 3, 2001
Cast: Perla Bautista, Ricci Chan, Jullia Clarete, John Lloyd Cruz, Baron Geisler, Aiza Marquez, Boy 2 Quizon, Paolo Rivero, Augusto Victa
34	"Balota"	Ellen Ongkeko-Marfil	Sarah Lumba	May 10, 2001
Cast: Richard Arellano, Rochelle Barrameda, Angelo Caangay, Jackie Castillejos, Johnny Delgado, Nandjng Josef, Tony Mabesa, Carlo Muñoz, Apreal Tolentino, Gamaliel Viray

=== Season 10 (2001–2002) ===
#	Episode title	Directed by	Written by	Original air date
1	"Basket"	Jerome Pobocan	Benedict Mique; Nita Eden	May 24, 2001
Cast: Judy Ann Santos, Caridad Sanchez, Nikka Valencia, Kier Legaspi, Dexter Doria, Joanna Marie Tan
2	"Wallet"	Laurenti M. Dyoji	Ricky Lee	May 31, 2001
Cast: Irma Adlawan, Kenneth Amora, Monina Bagatsing, Wowie De Guzman, Yuki Kadooka, Chandra Romero, Rhett Romero, Ronaldo Valdez, Miguel Vera
3	"Gatilyo"	Lupita Aquino-Kashiwahara	Ricky Lee	June 7, 2001
Cast: Tirso Cruz III, Daniel Fernando, Mar Garchitorena, Anita Linda, Lester Llansang, Justin Nibres, Julio Pacheco, Daria Ramirez, Stella Ruiz, Romnick Sarmenta
4	"Gitara"	Don Cuaresma	Benedict Mique	June 14, 2001
Cast: Carlo Aquino, Angelica Panganiban, Leni Santos, Rey Abellana, Mona Lisa, Vivian Foz
5	"Pinto"	John D-Lazatin	Mel Mendoza-Del Rosario	June 28, 2001
Cast: Eva Darren, Gelli De Belen, Diana Dela Fuente, Patricia Ishmael, Rosa Rosal, Idda Yaneza
6	"Mami at Siopao"	Wenn V. Deramas	Wenn V. Deramas	July 5, 2001
Cast: Rio Locsin, Carol Banawa, Augusto Victa, Carlo Muñoz, Perla Bautista, John Arcilla, Joana Marie Tan, Debraliz, Mike Austria
7	"Gamot"	Don Cuaresma	Ricky Lee	July 19, 2001
Cast: Marissa Delgado, Jean Garcia, Mel Kimura, Victor Neri, Alan Paule, Jet Paz, Richard Quan, Beth Tamayo
8	"Pier 39"	Don Cuaresma	Ricky Lee	July 26, 2001
Cast: Judy Ann Santos, Piolo Pascual, Manny Luna, Gary Agio, Christabel Savalas, Nico Sison
9	"Banyo"	Jerome Chavez Pobocan	Ricky Lee	August 2, 2001
Cast: Kaye Abad, Marvin Agustin, Cassie Baquirin, Ray Baquirin, Mon Confiado, Cherry Lou, Dimples Romana, Chandra Romero, Meryll Soriano
10	"Crib"	John D-Lazatin	Ricky Lee	August 9, 2001
Cast: Sandy Adolong, Christopher De Leon, Empress Schuck, Ynez Veneracion
11	"Hula"	Don Cuaresma	Ricky Lee	August 23, 2001
Cast: Ian Galliguez, Nanette Inventor, Patricia Ishmael, Sammy Lagmay, Troy Montero, Meg Reyes, Jake Roxas, Face Sales, Nikki Valdez
12	"Taho"	Jerry Lopez Sineneng	Ricky Lee	August 30, 2001
Cast: John Arcilla, Hannah Camille Bustillos, Kristine Garcia, Jacklyn Jose, Roderick Lindayag, Mike Lloren, William Lorenzo, Jet Paz, Gilleth Sandico, Joel Torre
13	"Lullaby"	Chito S. Roño	Benedict Mique	September 13, 2001
Cast: Sharon Cuneta, Serena Dalrymple, Dante Rivero
14	"Burda"	Jose Javier Reyes	Ricky Lee	September 20, 2001
Cast: Emman Abelada, Irma Adlawan, Toby Alejar, Jackie Lou Blanco, Sharon Cuneta, Heart Evangelista, Patrick Garcia, Luz Imperial, Gigi Locsin, Bibeth Orteza, Djohanna Rios, Marc Solis, Michael Yuseco, Lloyd Zaragoza
15	"Banyera"	Trina N. Dayrit	Ricky Lee	September 27, 2001
Cast: Rex Agoncillo, Tin Arnaldo, Nonie Buencamino, Ana Capri, Ronalisa Cheng, John Lloyd Cruz, Jess Evadore, Yuki Kadooka, Rio Locsin, Nina Mercado, Angelo Muñoz, Katrina Nazario, Julio Pacheco, Jet Paz, Veronica Peralejo, Crispin Pineda, Alwyn Utingco
16	"TV"	Jerry Lopez Sineneng	Ricky Lee	October 4, 2001
Cast: Susan Africa, Girlie Alcantara, Perla Bautista, Toffee Calma, Mon Confiado, Marick Dacanay, Francis Enriquez, Dante Gomez, Kathleen Hermosa, Cherry Lou, Cherry Pie Picache, Emil Sandoval, Ynez Veneracion
17	"Condo Unit"	Don Cuaresma	Ricky Lee	October 18, 2001
Cast: Jack Borlaza, Lexter Lazaro, Gerald Madrid, Aiko Melendez, Michael Rivero, Lucita Soriano, Carmina Villaroel, Marita Zobel
18	"Stuffed Toy"	John D-Lazatin	Ricky Lee	October 25, 2001
Cast: Irma Adlawan, Ronalisa Cheng, Karen delos Santos, Lorena Garcia, Tony Manalo, Dessa Quesada, Ama Quiambao, Thou Reyes, Bembol Roco, Aurora Veronica
19	"Lobo" "Balloon"	Malu Sevilla	Ricky Lee; Wali Ching	November 8, 2001
Cast: Regine Velasquez, Empress Schuck, Piolo Pascual, Liza Lorena, Jodi Sta. Maria, Romeo Rivera, Richard Quan, Angel Jacob, Evangeline Pascual, Gammy Viray, Michelle Estevez
20	"Boxing Ring: Part 1"	Trina N. Dayrit	Ricky Lee	November 22, 2001
Cast: Carlo Aquino, Janice De Belen, Michael Roy Jornales, Albert Martinez, Troy Martino, Pen Medina, Hazel Ann Mendoza, Rodney Shattara
21	"Boxing Ring: Part 2"	Trina N. Dayrit	Ricky Lee	November 29, 2001
Cast: Carlo Aquino, Janice De Belen, Michael Roy Jornales, Albert Martinez, Troy Martino, Pen Medina, Hazel Ann Mendoza, Rodney Shattara
22	"Ambu Bag"	Don Cuaresma	Ricky Lee	December 6, 2001
Cast: Hannah Camille Bustillos, Angeli Gonzales, Yuki Kadooka, Lani Mercado, Joanne Marie Tan, Joel Torre, Marita Zobel
23	"Exchange Gift"	John D-Lazatin	Ricky Lee	December 20, 2001
Cast: Sarah Christophers, Maoui David, Heart Evangelista, Crispin Pineda, John Prats
24	"Manika at Kotse-kotsehan"	Jerry Lopez Sineneng	Ricky Lee	December 27, 2001
Cast: Simon Ibarra, Glydel Mercado, Katrina Nazario, Robin Padilla, Joseph Roble
25	"Scented Candle"	Jerry Lopez Sineneng	Rhoda Sulit	January 10, 2002
Cast: Carmina Villarroel, Zoren Legaspi, Charlie Davao, Farrah Florer, Aurora Halili, Lander Vera Perez, Raquel Villavicencio
26	"Chicken Feet"	Jerry Lopez Sineneng	Ronald Carballo	January 17, 2002
Cast: Len Ag-Santos, John Apacible, Paolo Contis, Jacklyn Jose, Roxy Liquian, Brian Martin, Peter Serrano, Rodel Velayo
27	"Videoke"	Don Cuaresma	Mel Mendoza-Del Rosario	January 24, 2002
Cast: Dominic Ochoa, Sherilyn Reyes, Noel Trinidad, Nova Villa
28	"Gown"	Bobet Vidanes	Benedict Mique	January 30, 2002
Cast: Angelene Aguilar, Ai-Ai delas Alas, Alfred Labatos, Winnie Cordero, Abigail Lesley Cruz, Manjo Del Mundo, Liberty Lometillo, Jim Pebangco, Richard Merck
29	"Songbook"	Wenn V. Deramas	Keiko Aquino; Wenn V. Deramas	February 14, 2002
Cast: Eugene Domingo, Aiza Seguerra, Yayo Aguila, Michelle Ayalde, Jackie Castillejos, Matet de Leon, Patrick Garcia, Allan Paule, Gilleth Sandico, Empress Schuck, Dennis Trillo
30	"Sapatos" "Shoes"	Trina N. Dayrit	Delfin Ilao	February 21, 2002
Cast: Janus del Prado, Amy Austria, Jessie Diaz, Illonah Jean, William Lorenzo, Joey Marquez, Pinky Marquez, Christopher Roxas
31	"Kurtina" "Curtains"	Mae Czarina Cruz	Delfin Ilao	February 28, 2002
Cast: Marvin Agustin, Raye Baquirin, Shamaine Buencamino, Jhong Hilario, Sean Ignacio, Tony Manalo, Troy Martino, Julio Pacheco, Bamba
32	"Dahon at Langis"	Don Cuaresma	Mel Mendoza-Del Rosario	March 7, 2002
Cast: Steven Alonzo, Serena Dalrymple, Tonton Gutierrez, Nanette Inventor, Berting Labra, Glycol Mercado, Mosang
33	"Law Book"	Trina N. Dayrit	Ferdinand Manalili	March 21, 2002
Cast: Kristine Garcia, Vivian Foz, Rez Cortez, Jiego Malvar, Bayani Martin, Carlo Muñoz, Leandro Muñoz, Mico Palanca, Joel Torre
34	"Dyobus at Polbo"	Don Cuaresma	Delfin Ilao	April 4, 2002
Cast: Marc Acueza, John Arcilla, Melissa Avelino, Danilo Barrios, Jessie Diaz, Camille Prats, Peter Serrano
35	"Sweepstakes Ticket"	Don Cuaresma	Delfin Ilao	May 2, 2002
Cast: John Lloyd Cruz, Nonie Buencamino, Ronalisa Cheng, Cris Daluz, Tessie Tomas, Romano Vasquez
36	"Yearbook"	Wenn V. Deramas	Keiko Aquino	May 9, 2002
Cast: Alicia Alonzo, Angie Castrence, Joy Chiong, Rayver Cruz, Debraliz, Pops Fernandez, Tonton Gutierrez, Jane Oineza
37	"Dictionary"	Andoy Ranay	Keiko Aquino	May 16, 2002
Cast: Emman Abelada, Mylene Dizon, Eugene Domingo, Melvin Lee, Shaina Magdayao, Candy Pangilinan, Lito Pimentel, Elaine Quemuel, Christian Vasquez, Angela Velez, Lander Vera-Perez
38	"Lapida"	Wenn V. Deramas	Mel Mendoza-Del Rosario	May 23, 2002
Cast: Kris Aquino, Gandong Cervantes, Dessa, Sean Ignacio, John Lapus, Julio Pacheco, Phillip Salvador, Jimwell Stevens
39	"Lechon Manok"	Wenn V. Deramas	Agnes Gagelonia-Uligan	May 30, 2002
Cast: Irma Adlawan, Helen Gamboa, Gladys Reyes, Ciara Sotto, Alfred Vargas
40	"Volleyball"	Erick C. Salud	Jojo Nadela	June 6, 2002
Cast: Bianca Aguila, Carlo Aquino, Angelo Caangay, Abigail Lesley Cruz, Sarsi Emmanuelle, Roselito Lasala, Don Laurel, Pen Medina, Crispin Pineda, CJ Ramos, Efren Reyes Jr.
41	"Litrato"	Malu Sevilla	Delfin Ilao	June 20, 2002
Cast: Vina Morales, Wilma Doesnt, Onemig Bondoc, Jackie Castillejo, Carol Go, Neda Aviñante, April Lara
42	"Bracelet"	Erick C. Salud	Kye Carlos	June 27, 2002
Cast: Alicia Alonzo, Raymond Bagatsing, Ana Capri, Lara Fabregas, Spanky Manikan, Zia Marquez, Aura Mijares, Andre Tiangco, Chiqui Xerxes-Burgos

=== Season 11 (2002–2003) ===
#	Episode title	Directed by	Written by	Original air date
1	"Mittens"	Malu Sevilla	Rhoda Sulit	July 4, 2002
Cast: Nonie Buencamino, Lance Castillo, Patrick Garcia, Tanya Gomez, Maricel Laxa, Enid Reyes, Jodi Sta. Maria
2	"Ribbon"	Cathy Garcia-Sampana	Kye Carlos	July 18, 2002
Cast: Sara Christopher, Maoui David, Desiree Del Valle, Carmen Enriquez, Aurora Halili, Anita Linda, Allyzon Lualhati, Aiza Marquez, Camille Prats, Dennis Trillo
3	"Malaking Bahay"	Jerome Chavez Pobocan	Delfin Ilao	July 25, 2002
Cast: Susan Africa, Jestoni Alarcon, Perla Bautista, Gerald Madrid, Dimples Romana
4	"Singsing"	Bobet Vidanes	Kye Carlos	August 1, 2002
Cast: Sharmaine Arnaiz, Bentong, Reggie Curley, Malou De Guzman, Andrea Del Rosario, Robby Mananquil, Jenny Miller, Jimwell Stevens
5	"Bestida"	Erick C. Salud	Mel Mendoza-Del Rosario	August 8, 2002
Cast: Tommy Abuel, Amy Austria, Mico Aytona, Daisy Cariño, William Lorenzo, Jet Paz, Eliza Pineda, Rhett Romero, Empress Schuck, Princess Ann Schuck, Tessie Tomas
6	"Suman at Ketchup"	Cathy Garcia-Sampana	Ricky Lee; Wali Ching	August 22, 2002
Cast: Patrick Garcia, Kaye Abad, Lito Pimentel, Emilio Garcia, Vivian Foz, Liz Alindogan, Mico Palanca, Gudoy Pascual
7	"Maleta"	Jeffrey Jeturian	Nini S. Matilac	August 29, 2002
Cast: Irma Adlawan, Benedict Chan, Malou Crisologo, Desiree Del Valle, Vanessa Escano, Lam Kwok Ho, Anastacia Ma, Cherry Pie Picache
8	"Raketa"	Erick C. Salud	Kye Carlos	September 5, 2002
Cast: Pinky De Leon, Vanna Garcia, Angeli Gonzales, Aiza Marquez, Daria Ramirez, Romeo Rivera, Empress Schuck, Jennifer Sevilla
9	"TV"	John-D Lazatin	Jojo Nadela	September 12, 2002
Cast: Rita Avila, Niña De Sagun, Allan Paule, Jet Paz, Joseph Roble, Melisse Santiago
10	"Deposit Slip"	Jeffrey Jeturian	Agnes Gagelonia-Uligan	September 19, 2002
Cast: Raye Baquirin, Rochelle Barrameda, Jerry Javier, Pocholo Montes, Carlos Morales, Candy Pangilinan, Ina Raymundo
11	"Mikropono"	Erick C. Salud	Kye Carlos	September 27, 2002
Cast: L.A. Lopez, Mystica, Sylvia Sanchez, Peter Serrano, Miguel Vera
12	"Kubo"	Jerry Lopez Sineneng	Dado C. Lumibao	October 3, 2002
Cast: Lance Castillo, Matet De Leon, Carlo Muñoz, Crispin Pineda, Ces Quesada, Ced Torrecarion, Alfred Vargas, Chiqui Xerxes-Burgos
13	"Kape"	Malu Sevilla	Mel Mendoza-Del Rosario	October 10, 2002
Cast: Tess Antonio, Andrew Kyle Aquino, Raye Baquirin, Daisy Cariño, AiAi Delas Alas, Kristel Fulgar, Elaine Quemuel, Ariel Rivera, Gilleth Sandico, Marita Zobel
14	"Respirator"	Jerry Lopez Sineneng	Dado C. Lumibao	October 17, 2002
Cast: Marc Acueza, Robert Arevalo, Hannah Camille Bustillos, Eva Darren, Ilonah Jean, William Lorenzo, Robin Padilla, Beth Tamayo
15	"Makeup Kit"	Andoy Ranay	Rhoda Sulit	October 24, 2002
Cast: Carl John Barrameda, Perla Bautista, Ricky Davao, Karla Estrada, Lara Fabregas, Agot Isidro, Angela Velez
16	"Machine Shop"	Jeffrey Jeturian	Nannette Mantilac	October 31, 2002
Cast: Irma Adlawan, Julia Clarete, Marianne de la Riva, Mel Martinez, Daria Ramirez, Ina Raymundo, Dante Rivero, Empress Schuck, Joanna Marie Tan
17	"Treehouse"	Jerome Chavez Pobocan	Rhoda Sulit	November 7, 2002
Cast: Menggie Cobarrubias, Eloy De Guzman, Niña De Sagun, Dexter Doria, Gigi Locsin, Jenny Miller, Dominic Ochoa, Gigette Reyes, Juan Rodrigo, Dimples Romana, Andre Tiangco, Dennis Trillo
18	"Helmet"	Jerry Lopez Sineneng	Agnes Gagelonia-Uligan	November 14, 2002
Cast: Ermie Concepcion, Lara Fabregas, Lorena Garcia, Gerard Pizzaras, Spencer Reyes, Snooky Ann Sanchez, Gloria Sevilla, Jennifer Sevilla, Jimwell Stevens, Eula Valdez
19	"Cupcake"	Erick C. Salud	Nanette Matilac	November 21, 2002
Cast: Angelene Aguilar, Ronalisa Cheng, Minda Flores, Baron Geisler, Myca Lobregat, Aiza Marquez, Isabellą Marquez, Bryan Martin, Camille Prats, Mat Ranillo III
20	"Lubid"	Wenn V. Deramas	Agnes Gagelonia-Uligan	November 28, 2002
Cast: Nora Aunor, Joel Torre, Matet de Leon, Spanky Manikan, Kathleen Hermosa, L.A. Mumar, Andoy Ranay
21	"Blue Moon"	Trina N. Dayrit	Lualhati Bautista	December 5, 2002
Cast: Jon Achaval, Reggie Curley, Marissa Delgado, Farrah Florer, Mar Garchitorena, Enrique Gonzales, Ramil Rodriquez, Noel Trinidad, Nova Villa, Freddie Webb, Marita Zobel
22	"Bote"	Malu Sevilla	FM Reyes	December 12, 2002
Cast: Tommy Abuel, Malou De Guzman, Ian De Leon, Gina Pareño, Ama Quiambao, Chiqui Xerxes-Burgos
23	"Regalo"	Cathy Garcia-Sampana	Kye Carlos	December 19, 2002
Cast: Sarah Christophers, CJ Ramos, Coney Reyes, Ronaldo Valdez, Camilla Villamil, Anne Villegas
24	"CD"	John D-Lazatin	Mari Mariano	December 26, 2002
Cast: Joyce Jimenez, Nicole Judalena, Vhong Navarro, Tom Olivar, Dante Rivero, Ced Torrecarion, Idda Yaneza
25	"Upuan"	Leo Rilap	Delfin Ilao; Ricky Lee	January 9, 2003
Cast: Mico Aytona, Carl John Barrameda, Sarah Jane Carillo, Mona Lisa, Jiego Malvar, Glydel Mercado, Joel Torre, Ralph Marlon Yu
26	"Flat Tire"	Jerome Chavez Pobocan	Rhoda Sulit	January 16, 2003
Cast: Amy Austria, Maoui David, Niña De Sagun, Heart Evangelista, Emilio Garcia, Baron Geisler, John Prats
27	"Gayuma"	Lupita Aquino-Kashiwahara	Mel Mendoza-Del Rosario	January 23, 2003
Cast: Ermie Concepcion, Michael De Mesa, Assunta De Rossi, Debraliz, Jay Manalo, Ces Quesada
28	"Painting"	Dado C. Lumibao	Jerry Lopez Sineneng	January 30, 2003
Cast: Jestoni Alcatron, Michelle Bayle, Ronalisa Cheng, Cris Daluz, Luz Fernandez, Jaclyn Jose, Berting Labra, Mario Magallona, Nina Manalo, Olga Natividad, Jet Paz, Richard Quan, John Wayne Sace
29	"Baby Book"	Andoy Ranay	Mel Mendoza-Del Rosario	February 6, 2003
Cast: Karlina Bayot, Johnny Delgado, Ana Feleo, Laurice Guillen, Sherry Lara, Gerald Madrid, Evangeline Pascual, Dennis Trillo
30	"Bahay Kubo"	John D-Lazatin	Agnes Gagelonia-Uligan	February 13, 2003
Cast: Nancy Castiglione, Paolo Contis, Katrina Nazario, Gigette Reyes, Meg Reyes, Rosa Rosal, Mark Angelo Wilson
31	"Chocolate Ice Cream"	Erick C. Salud	Kye Carlos	February 27, 2003
Cast: Yayo Aguila, Nicole Anderson, Phoemela Baranda, Jessie Diaz, Korinne Lirio, Shaina Magdayao, Dominic Ochoa, Jolo Revilla, Alwyn Uytingco
32	"Makeup"	Jerry Lopez Sineneng	Delfin Ilao	March 6, 2003
Cast: Alicia Alonzo, Serena Dalrymple, Eva Darren, Ricky Davao, Spanky Manikan, Peter Serrano, Cris Villanueva, Carmina Villaroel
33	"Liham"	Trina N. Dayrit	Ricky Lee; Nannette Matilac	March 13, 2003
Cast: Tirso Cruz III, Mel Kimura, Aiza Marquez, Julio Pacheco, Liza Ranillo, Sylvia Sanchez, Empress Schuck, Jodi Sta. Maria
34	"Kama"	John D-Lazatin	Shugo Praico	March 20, 2003
Cast: Robert Arevalo, Danilo Barrios, Malou De Guzman, Moreen Guese, Ice Seguerra
35	"Bilibid"	Jerry Lopez Sineneng	Ricky Lee; Mel Mendoza-Del Rosario	March 27, 2003
Cast: John Apacible, Perla Bautista, Ermie Concepcion, Wilma Doesnt, Jean Garcia, Tonton Gutierrez, Berting Labra, Ricky Rivero
36	"Mikropono"	Jerry Lopez Sineneng	Agnes Gagelonia-Uligan; Mel Mendoza-Del Rosario	April 3, 2003
Cast: Kaye Abad, Marc Acueza, Gina Alajar, Melissa Avelino, Ricky Davao, Angeli Flores, Cherry Lou, Bernard Palanca, Mico Palanca, Jet Paz, John Wayne Sace, Melisse Santiago, Princess Ann Schuck
37	"Sing-along Bar"	Wenn V. Deramas	Keiko Aquino	April 10, 2003
Cast: Maricel Soriano, John Lapus, Rosa Rosal, Cris Villanueva, Elaine Quemuel, Carlos Morales, Gloria Sevilla, Rey Kilay
38	"Torotot"	Wenn V. Deramas	Agnes Gagelonia-Uligan	April 24, 2003
Cast: Marco Aytona, Eugene Domingo, DJ Durano, Yuki Kadooka, Jiro Manio, Aiko Melendez, Roderick Paulate
39	"Dreamhouse"	Trina N. Dayrit	Delfin Ilao; Benedict Mique	April 25, 2003
Cast: Andrea Del Rosario, Igi Boy Flores, Tanya Gomez, Gino Paul Guzman, Sean Ignacio, Berting Labra, Bernard Palanca, Rica Peralejo, Crispin Pineda, Alfred Vargas, Raquel Villavicencio, Chiqui Xerxes-Burgos
40	"Kutsilyo"	Andoy Ranay	Mel Mendoza Del-Rosario	May 1, 2003
Cast: Mico Aytona, Niña De Guzman, Johnny Delgado, Klaudia Koronel, Mona Lisa, Aiza Marquez, Dominic Ochoa, Jet Paz, Chandra Romero, Job Zamora
41	"Life Plan"	Gilbert Perez	Rhoda Sulit	May 8, 2003
Cast: Marc Acueza, Sarah Christophers, Charlie Davao, Rio Locsin, Eliza Pineda, Phillip Salvador, Eula Valdes, Archie Ventosa
42	"Paper Dolls"	Wenn V. Deramas	Wenn V. Deramas	May 15, 2003
Cast: Rita Avila, Maoui David, Alvin Gabito, Sean Ignacio, Rosanna Jover, Melvin Lee, Roxy Liquigan, Mike Lloren, Carlo Maceda, Dominic Ochoa, Alan Paule, Andoy Ranay, Daniel King Reyes, Shelia Marie Rodriguez, Dimples Romana, Jojo Saguin, Erick C. Salud, Timmy Boy Sta. Maria
43	"Garapon" "Jar"	Mae Cruz-Alviar; Cathy Garcia-Sampana	Mel Mendoza-Del Rosario; Gilbeys Sardea	May 22, 2003
Cast: Ricky Davao, Carlo Aquino, Emman Abelada, Noni Buencamino, Karel Marquez, Aurora Uding, Jacklyn Jose
44	"Strawberry Fields"	Jose Javier Reyes	Jose Javier Reyes	May 29, 2003
Cast: Tommy Abuel, Justin Cuyugan, Eva Darren, Ryan Galvez, Kristine Hermosa, Madeline Nicholas, Piolo Pascual, Lui Villaruz
45	"Taho"	Joyce Bernal	Rebecca Medina	June 5, 2003
Cast: Angelene Aguilar, Perla Bautista, Julia Clarete, Minda Flores, Emilio Garcia, Banaue Miclat, Nante Montreal, Athenea Pla, Elaine Quemuel, Liza Ranillo, Joanna Marie Tan, Lorna Tolentino
46	"Transistor"	Gilbert Perez	Mel Mendoza-Del Rosario	June 12, 2003
Cast: Vhong Navarro, Gerard Pizarras, Manilyn Reynes, Romnick Sarmenta
47	"Ilaw ng Poste"	Andoy Ranay	Rhoda Sulit	June 19, 2003
Cast: Len Ag-Santos, Tess Antonio, Angel Aquino, Ronalisa Cheng, Frances Ignacio, Anne Larrucea, Shaina Magdayao, Jane Oineza, Eliza Pineda, Joel Saracho, Tessie Tomas, Geraldine Villamil
48	"Lapis" "Pencil"	Gilbert Perez	Rhoda Sulit	June 26, 2003
Cast: John Lloyd Cruz, Bea Alonzo, Baron Geisler, Anita Linda, Ced Torrecarion, Julio Pacheco, Joshua Dionisio, Gem Ramos, Pinky De Leon

=== Season 12 (2003–2004) ===
A new theme song was released during that season as sung by Carol Banawa from episode 32 onwards.

#	Episode title	Directed by	Written by	Original air date
1	"Imahe ng Birhen"	Wenn V. Deramas	Gilbeys Sardea; Wenn V. Deramas	July 3, 2003
Pablo Sarmiento began his journey as an actor's assistant. Still, his life changed when he became a star and became known as "Babalu", a name originating from his long chin. Despite his newfound success as a star, he was lured by the vices. In his later years, his alcoholism led to his worsening health, fearing that his career would end. Cast: Tirso Cruz III, Paolo Contis, DJ Durano, Ketchup Eusebio, Illonah Jean, Pauleen Luna, Eric Quizon
2	"Engagement Ring"	Gilbert Perez	Maribel Ilag	July 10, 2003
Cast: Alicia Alonzo, Raymond Bagatsing, Chandra Concepcion, Gemmae Custodio, Charlie Davao, Eugene Domingo, Angeli Gonzales, Emeline Guinid, Agot Isidro, Evangeline Maganta, Mica Ochangco, Bernard Palanca, Rica Peralejo, Gigi Posadas
3	"Toothpaste"	Cathy Garcia-Sampana	Gilbeys Sardea	July 17, 2003
Cast: Bayani Agbayani, Boots Anson-Roa, Aleck Bovick, Igi Boy Flores, Simon Ibarra, Nicole Julia Lagman, Noel Trinidad
4	"Wedding Ring"	Jerome Chavez Pobocan	Rhoda Sulit; Alieen Viray	July 24, 2003
Cast: Raye Baquirin, Gary Estrada, Patricia Javier, Bing Magtoto, Diether Ocampo
5	"Ferry Boat"	Jerry Lopez Sineneng	Agnes Gagelonia-Uligan	July 31, 2003
Cast: John Arcilla, Jackie Castillejos, Eva Darren, Ricky Davao, Heart Evangelista, Rio Locsin, John Prats, Joanna Marie Tan
6	"Tsubibo"	Malu Sevilla	Gilbeys Sardea	August 7, 2003
Cast: Michael Flores, Dick Israel, Kier Legaspi, Aubrey Miles, Troy Montero, Elizabeth Oropesa, Halina Perez, Gerard Pizzaras, Juan Rodrigo, Maye Tongco
7	"Trophy"	Jeffrey Jeturian	Rhoda Sulit	August 14, 2003
Cast: Susan Africa, Safeyi Awadi, Michelle Bayle, Ana Capri, Luz Fernandez, Mickey Ferriols, Carolina Gómez, Jennifer Illustre, Jay Manalo, Jiro Manio, Christopher Manjares, Cris Villanueva
8	"Salamin"	Jeffrey Jeturian	Maribel Ilag	August 21, 2003
Cast: Toby Alejar, Robert Arevalo, Aaron Concepcion, Reggie Curley, Bing Davao, Nelson Evangelista, Paolo Maderal, Robby Mananquil, Gina Pareño, Polo Ravales, Jim Santos, Fanny Serrano
9	"Lugaw"	Cathy Garcia-Sampana	Rhoda Sulit	August 28, 2003
Young Rene, who would later become the country's most promising comedian, dedicated his life fending for his poor parents and six siblings. He got into every imaginable blue-collar job until he tried his luck at the local theater as an actor. Success is sweet, but Rene achieved this by hard work. Despite a lifetime of hardships and struggle for survival, Rene Requiestas (played by Long Mejia) left a legacy of laughter to his family and to all those who were privileged to witness his brief stint in the television and movie industry. Cast: Long Mejia, Malou de Guzman, Nanding Josef, Hyubs Azarcon, Angelo Caangay, Blair Arellano, Boomboom Gonzales, Joy Chiong, Trix Llanes
10	"Plake"	Gilbert Perez	Maribel Ilag	September 4, 2003
Cast: Angelica Jones, Irma Adlawan, Rex Agoncillo, Adrian Albert, Clint Albert, Ricardo Cepeda, Minda Flores, Aiza Marquez, Sylvia Sanchez, Joel Torre
11	"Bonnet"	Joyce Bernal	Maribel Ilag	September 11, 2003
Cast: Karlina Bayot, Zeppi Borromeo, Eva Darren, Andrew E., Ryan Eigenmann, Madeleine Humphries, Vhong Navarro, Vandolph
12	"Stuffed Toy"	Joyce Bernal	Gilbeys Sardea	September 18, 2003
Cast: Ching Arellano, Mon Confiado, Justin Cuyugan, Dagul, Angelu De Leon, Pen Medina, Crispin Pineda, Ces Quesada, Chandra Romero
13	"Kotse"	Rory B. Quintos	Mel Mendoza-Del Rosario	September 25, 2003
Cast: Maui Taylor, Susan Africa, Rex Agoncillo, Marco Aytona, Emilio Garcia, Ethan Javier, Spanky Manikan, Nante Montreal, Pia Moran, Jet Paz, Empress Schuck, Joanna Marie Tan, Alfred Vargas, Idda Yaneza
14	"Unan" "Pillow"	Jerry Lopez Sineneng	Gilbeys Sardea; Mel Mendoza-Del Rosario	October 2, 2003
Born Julie Pearl Postigo, Julie Vega (played by Angelica Panganiban) began her career at the age of three, when she did her very first TV commercial. Despite her parents' misgivings, Julie turned out to have a natural talent for acting, something she proved beyond any doubt when she won the title role in the film Mga Mata ni Angelita (1978) after an exhaustive nationwide search. When soap stardom came at the age of 11 via her starring role in Anna Liza (1980), Julie's potential for further fame was sealed, which is why her sudden death shocked the entire country. Cast: Angelica Panganiban, Michael De Mesa, Rio Locsin, Kristopher Peralta, Adrian Alandy, Mosang
15	"Bituin"	Gilbert Perez	Maribel Ilag	October 9, 2003
Cast: Roderick Paulate, Mico Aytona, Carl John Barrameda, Dante Castro, Rene Dela Cruz, Errol Dionisio, Jess Evardone, Farrah Florer, Yuki Kadooka, Alma Lerma, Bonggoy Manahan, Manilyn Reynes, Ruby Rosa, Neil Ryan Sese, Geraldine Villamil, Nicole Yabut
16	"Cassette Tape"	Malu Sevilla	Maribel Ilag	October 16, 2003
Cast: Andrew E., Tommy Abuel, Gio Alvarez, Niña De Sagun, Cogie Domingo, Dexter Doria, Gwen Garci, Rochelle Garcuho, Athenea Pla, CJ Ramos, Gem Ramos, Rafael Rosell
17	"Kulambo"	Jerry Lopez Sineneng	Maribel Ilag	October 23, 2003
Cast: Gladys Reyes, Andrew Kyle Aquino, Ronalisa Cheng, Moreen Guese, Jaclyn Jose, Mel Kimura, Carmi Martin, Julio Pacheco, Veronica Peralejo, Lito Pimentel, Eliza Pineda, Meg Reyes, Christopher Roxas
18	"Fatima Soriano"	Joyce Bernal	Gilbeys Sardea	October 30, 2003
Cast: Moreen Guese, Tess Antonio, Menggie Cobarrubias, Frances Ignacio, Lui Manansala, Albert Martinez, Snooky Serna
19	"Kalapati"	Malu Sevilla	Chris Violago	November 6, 2003
Cast: Assunta de Rossi, Kakai Bautista, Jaja Bolivar, Mario Capaland, Gandong Cervantes, Joshua Deocareza, Gino Paul Guzman, Jennifer Illustre, Ronnie Lazaro, Daria Ramirez, Dustin Reyes, Shelia Marie Rodriguez, Jim Santos, Empress Schuck, Neil Ryan Sese, Apreal Tolentino, Christian Vasquez
20	"Fried Chicken"	John D-Lazatin	Maribel Ilag	November 13, 2003
Cast: Dominic Ochoa, Mico Antona, Zeppi Borromeo, Malou De Guzman, Christian Galindo, Dick Israel, Cherry Lou, Crispin Pineda, Christian Regino
21	"Crossword Puzzle"	Malu Sevilla	Delfin Ilao	November 20, 2003
Cast: Ogie Diaz, Susan Africa, Tess Antonio, Janus Del Prado, Ketchup Eusebio, Cristy Fermin, Denise Joaquin, Mel Martinez, Pen Medina, Liza Ranillo, Timmy Boy Sta. Maria, Diana Zuburi
22	"Pawikan"	Tots Mariscal	Rhoda Sulit	November 27, 2003
Cast: Kaye Abad, Joe Gruta, Ryan Manalo, Jiro Manio, Carlos Rivera, Jeremiah Rosales, Jericho Rosales
23	"Ice Cream"	Mae Cruz-Alviar	Gilbeys Sardea	December 4, 2003
Cast: Vina Morales, Yayo Aguila, Alicia Alonzo, Niña De Sagun, Angel Jacob, Jiego Malvar, Jane fineza, Cris Villanueva
24	"Aparado"	Joyce Bernal	Mel Mendoza-Del Rosario	December 11, 2003
Cast: Renee Hampshire, Girlie Alcantara, Harlene Bautista, Lance Castillo, Ronalisa Cheng, Kathleen Hermosa, Sean Ignacio, J.M. Lagumbay, Efren Reyes Jr., Sylvia Sanchez, Tuesday Vargas
25	"Bubog"	Rory B. Quintos	Gilbeys Sardea	December 18, 2003
Cast: Ricky Davao, Menngie Cobarrubias, Joshua Dionisio, Jean Garcia, Lorenzo Mara, Daniel Morial, Eliza Pineda, Gilleth Sandico, Marita Zobel
26	"Manok"	Joyce Bernal	Maribel Ilag	January 1, 2004
Cast: Arlene Muhlach, Jestoni Alarcon, John Apacible, Rochelle Barrameda, Pinky De Leon, J.P. Lagumbay, Allyzon Lualhati, Richard Quan, Ricky Rivero, Joel Torre, Pia Wurtzbach
27	"Police Car"	Joyce Bernal	Gilbeys Sardea	January 8, 2004
Cast: Steven Claude Goyong, Lito Pimentel, Zsa Zsa Padilla
28	"Larawan" "Pictures"	Cathy Garcia-Sampana	Rhoda Sulit	January 15, 2004
Cast: Ricky Davao, Eula Valdes
29	"Entablado"	Mae Cruz-Alviar	Rhoda Sulit	January 29, 2004
In the early 1930s, Adelaida Fernando joined the entertainment world, despite her father's opposition. Cast: Nanette Inventor, Manilyn Reynes
30	"Gitara"	Cathy Garcia-Sampana	Gilbeys Sardea	February 5, 2004
Cast: Victor Neri, Mickey Ferriols
31	"Orchids"	Ricky Davao	Francis Xavier Pasion	February 12, 2004
Cast: Tuesday Vargas, TJ Trinidad
32	"Telebisyon"	Mae Cruz-Alviar	Maribel Ilag	February 19, 2004
Cast: Jericho Rosales, Cherry Pie Picache
33	"Lupa"	Joyce Bernal	Gilbeys Sardea	February 26, 2004
Cast: Mura, Marco Aytona, Beth Tamayo, Miguel Vera
34	"Sto. Niño de Cebu"	Mae Cruz-Alviar	Francis Xavier Pasion; Mel Mendoza-Del Rosario	March 4, 2004
Cast: Angelika Dela Cruz, Melissa Mendez, Miguel Vera, Ketchup Eusebio, Mico Aytona, Alfred Labatos, Sarah Palad, Jericho Rosales, Christian Bautista, Teresa Garcia, Johann Escanan, D.K. Tijam, Michelle San Miguel
35	"Album"	Rory B. Quintos	Maribel Ilag	March 11, 2004
Cast: Jeffrey Quizon, Tommy Abuel, Jean Saburit, Lito Legaspi, King Alcala, Richard Arellano, Cyrus Valdez, Missy Maramara, Lito Camo
36	"Yellow Baby" "Biliary Atresia"	Rory B. Quintos	Dado C. Lumibao	March 18, 2004
Cast: Jhong Hilario, Desiree del Valle
37	"Ribbon"	Rory B. Quintos	Gilbeys Sardea	March 25, 2004
Cast: Alessandra de Rossi, Rio Locsin, Ronnie Lazaro, Archie Ventura, Mario Magallona, Neil Sese, Empress Schuck, Rodjun Cruz, Owen Bowen
38	"Barya"	Mae Cruz-Alviar	Gilbeys Sardea; Mel Mendoza-Del Rosario	April 1, 2004
Cast: Mark Bautista, Gina Alajar, Efren Reyes Jr., Dimples Romana, CJ Ramos, Aljon Valdenebro, Manu Respall, Chevy Mercado, Orie Jun Maventa
39	"School Bus"	Rory B. Quintos	Rhoda Sulit	April 15, 2004
Cast: Nikole Chan, Marciel Laxa, Albert Martinez
40	"Comedy Bar"	Joyce Bernal	Maribel Ilag	April 22, 2004
Cast: Chokoleit, Malou de Guzman, Pen Medina, Cris Villanueva, Carl John Barrameda, John Manalo, Allen Dizon, Charlon Davao, Sheila Marie Rodriguez, Trisza
41	"Motorsiklo"	Mae Cruz-Alviar	Maribel Ilag	April 29, 2004
Cast: Angelene Aguilar, Tonton Gutierrez, Liza Lorena, Michael Flores, Monina Bagasting, Mike Cruz, Ginger Smith, Jasmin Collins, McMiel Dehison, Jason Colis
42	"Upuan"	Lino S. Cayetano	Senedy Que; Lino S. Cayetano; Mel Mendoza-Del Rosario	May 6, 2004
Cast: Jaclyn Jose, John Lloyd Cruz, Sharmaine Arnaiz, Miko Palanca, Lander Vera-Perez, Miguel Garcia, Ronaldo Valdez
43	"Tela"	Jeffrey Jeturian	Gilbeys Sardea	May 13, 2004
Cast: Romnick Sarmenta, Daria Ramirez
44	"Boxing Gloves"	Joyce Bernal	Maribel Flag; Mel Mendoza-Del Rosario	May 20, 2004
Cast: Marvin Agustin, Maricar De Mesa, Cherry Lou, Elizabeth Oropesa, Crispin Pineda
45	"Jacket"	Mae Cruz-Alviar	Maribel Ilag	May 27, 2004
Cast: Jhong Hilario, Rocky Martinez, Sylvia Sanchez, Miguel Vera
46	"Barbeque"	Jerry Lopez Sineneng	Gilbeys Sardea	June 3, 2004
Cast: Joseph Bitangcol, Rio Locsin
47	"Karinderia"	Rory B. Quintos	Rhoda Sulit	June 10, 2004
Cast: Eula Valdes, Hazel Ann Mendoza
48	"Pisara"	Mae Cruz-Alviar	Gilbeys Sardea	June 17, 2004
Cast: Vhong Navarro, Tin Arnaldo
49	"Plaka"	Rory B. Quintos	Rhoda Sulit	June 24, 2004
Cast: Danilo Barrios, Spencer Reyes, Sylvia Sanchez

=== Season 13 (2004–2005) ===
#	Episode title	Directed by	Written by	Original air date
1	"Salamin"	Mae Cruz-Alviar	Gilbeys Sardea	July 1, 2004
Cast: Susan Africa, John Arcilla, Neri Naig
2	"Guhit"	Cathy Garcia-Sampana	Francis Xavier Pasion	July 8, 2004
Cast: Hero Angeles, Amy Austria, Michael De Mesa, Gerald Madrid
3	"Droga"	Cathy Garcia-Sampana	Gilbeys Sardea	July 15, 2004
Cast: Desiree del Valle, Jaclyn Jose, Ronnie Lazaro, Miko Palanca, Gerard Pizzaras, Ogie Diaz, Gino Paul Guzman, Diego Malvar, Daniel Murial, Mariz Dimayuga
4	"Bisikleta"	Cathy Garcia-Sampana	Rhoda Sulit	July 22, 2004
Cast: Raymond Bagatsing, Glazia De Castro, Lester Llansang, Chandra Romero, Bembol Roco, Lotlot De Leon, CJ Ramos, Michelle Bayle, Tess Dumpit, Crispin Pineda, Menggie Cobarubias, Blair Arellano, JP Lagumbay
5	"Birth Certificate"	Jerome Chavez Pobocan	Rhoda Sulit	August 5, 2004
Cast: Angelika Dela Cruz, Alicia Alonzo, Nanding Josef
6	"Scrapbook"	Mae Cruz-Alviar	Rhoda Sulit	August 12, 2004
Cast: Sandara Park, Yayo Aguila, William Lorenzo, Miles Ocampo, Luz Valdez, Marco Aytona, Monica Shy, Hero Angeles
7	"Piano"	Mae Cruz-Alviar	Gilbeys Sardea	August 19, 2004
Cast: Ricky Davao, Chin Chin Gutierrez
8	"Aklat" "Book"	Nuel Crisostomo Naval	Arlene "Iya" Tamayo	August 26, 2004
Francisco Domagoso (Danilo Barrios), later known as Isko Moreno, was a street child born into his father's second family. He was determined to bring himself out of poverty and provide for his family before he was recruited by a talent manager to be part of show business. Cast: Danilo Barrios, Rio Locsin, Nonie Buencamino, John Glenn Ignacio
9	"Teddy Bear"	Joyce Bernal	Maribel Ilag	September 2, 2004
Cast: Pokwang, Joshua Dionisio, Kenji Motoki, Nikki Valdez
10	"Araw"	FM Reyes	Gilbeys Sardea	September 9, 2004
Cast: Wowie De Guzman, Perla Bautista, Princess Punzulan
11	"Family Picture"	Luigi Santiago	Maribel Ilag	September 16, 2004
Cast: Andrea Del Rosario, Basty Alcances, Owen Bowen, Reggie Curley, Justin Cuyugan, Chiqui Del Carmen, Karla Estrada, Mark Gil, Ethan Javier, Carlo Maceda, Melissa Mendez, Sarah Palad, Joseph Roble
12	"Black Pearls"	Cathy Garcia-Sampana	Rhoda Sulit	September 23, 2004
Cast: Albert Martinez, Carlo Aquino, Alicia Alonzo, Nanding Josef, Pinky Amador, Nina De Sagun
13	"Popcorn"	FM Reyes	Gilbeys Sardea	September 30, 2004
Cast: Katherine Luna, Sylvia Sanchez, Gardo Versoza
14	"Notebook"	FM Reyes	Rhoda Sulit	October 14, 2004
Cast: Angelika Dela Cruz, Gino Paul Guzman, Lui Manansala
15	"Puno: Part 1"	Lino S. Cayetano	Arlene Tamayo	October 21, 2004
Cast: Jean Garcia, Julia Clarete, Maja Salvador, Miles Ocampo, Jiego Malvar, Tommy Abuel, Marita Zobel, Dominic Ochoa, Gloria Sevilla, Cris Villanueva, Mico Palanca, Blair Arellano, Joshua Dionisio, Tessie Tomas
16	"Puno: Part 2"	Lino S. Cayetano	Arlene Tamayo	October 28, 2004
Cast: Jean Garcia, Julia Clarete, Maja Salvador, Miles Ocampo, Jiego Malvar, Tommy Abuel, Marita Zobel, Dominic Ochoa, Gloria Sevilla, Cris Villanueva, Mico Palanca, Blair Arellano, Joshua Dionisio, Tessie Tomas, Claire Marie Velasco
17	"Rosas"	Malu Sevilla	Maribel Ilag	November 11, 2004
Cast: Ya Chang, Dexter Doria, Dick Israel, Jennifer Lee, Neri Naif
18	"Kutsilyo"	Lino S. Cayetano	Galo Ador	November 18, 2004
Cast: Anne Curtis, Elizabeth Oropesa, Efren Reyes, Jr., Ryan Eigenmann, Kier Legaspi, Alfred Vargas, Adrian Alandy, Sarah Palad, Richard Quan, Joey Galvez, Mario Capalud, Lux Laurel, Jeanette Joaquin, Michaela Monteverde
19	"Piyesa"	Lino S. Cayetano	Arlene Tamayo	November 25, 2004
Cast: Raymond Bagatsing, Assunta De Rossi, Beth Tamayo
20	"CD"	Malu Sevilla	Arlene Tamayo	December 9, 2004
Cast: Patrick Garcia, Rayver Cruz, Rio Locsin
21	"Kurtina"	Cathy Garcia-Sampana	Dado C. Lumibao	December 16, 2004
Cast: Long Mejia, Lotlot De Leon, G. Toengi
22	"Ferris Wheel"	FM Reyes	Maribel Ilag	December 23, 2004
Cast: Gina Alajar, Nonie Buencamino, Angelika Dela Cruz, Jericho Rosales
23	"Timbangan"	Joyce Bernal	Maribel Ilag	January 6, 2005
Cast: Marissa Sanchez, Michelle Ayalde, Ferdie Bernal, Christian Galindo, Trina Legaspi, Ces Quesada, Bembol Roco, Ian Veneracion
24	"Dance Floor"	Rechie Del Carmen	Dado C. Lumibao	January 13, 2005
Cast: Jean Garcia, Angelo Caanagay, Daisy Cariño, Michael Cruz, Moreen Guese, Jerome John Hughes, Hazel Ann Mendoza, Cody Moreno, Bodjie Pascua, Jet Paz, Chandra Romero, Christian Vasquez, Mystica
25	"Mascot"	FM Reyes	Gilbeys Sardea	January 20, 2005
Cast: Marvin Agustin, Elizabeth Oropesa, Beth Tamayo, Joel Torre
26	"Marmol"	Wenn V. Deramas	Dado C. Lumibao	January 27, 2005
Cast: Gardo Versoza, Malou De Guzman, Ronnie Lazaro, Eugene Domingo, Deejay Durano, Marcus Madrigal, Joseph Robie, Ernest Sto. Tomas, Ketchup Eusebio
27	"Bulaklak"	Jeffrey Jeturian	Maribel Ilag	February 3, 2005
Cast: Boots Anson-Roa, Agot Isidro, Eric Quizon, Dante Rivero
28	"Liham"	Jerry Lopez Sinning	Arlene Tamayo	February 10, 2005
Cast: Perla Bautista, Encar Benedicto, Paolo Contis, Eva Darren, Angel De Leon, Jaime Fabregas, Jennifer Illustre, Rio Locsin, Kristopher Peralta, Cherry Pie Picache, Neil Ryan Sese, Jodi Sta. Maria, TJ Trinidad, Anne Villegas
29	"Trolley"	Gilbert Perez	Ruel Montañez; Dado C. Lumibao	February 17, 2005
Cast: John Prats, Baron Geisler, Sylvia Sanchez, Nonie Buencamino, Isabel Oli, Owen Bowen, Jodell Stasic
30	"Gusali"	Wenn V. Deramas	Keiko Aquino	February 24, 2005
Cast: Wowie De Guzman, Desiree Del Valle, Pen Medina, Neri Naig, Crispin Pineda, Caridad Sanchez
31	"Chinese Garter"	Rory B. Quintos	Rhoda Sulit	March 3, 2005
Cast: Jon Achaval, Raye Baquirin, Perla Bautista, Ronalisa Cheng, Niña De Segun, Kristel Fulgar, Jessette Prospero, Empress Schuck, Jennifer Sevilla, Nikka Valencia
32	"Pakwan"	Lino S. Cayetano	Dado C. Lumibao	March 10, 2005
Cast: Danny Ildefonso, John Apacible, Robert Arevalo, Gandong Cervantes, Jiro Manio, Victor Neri, Daria Ramirez
33	"Bisikleta"	Wenn V. Deramas	Ruel Montañez	March 17, 2005
Cast: Mark Angelo Wilson, Tommy Abuel, Niña De Segun, Eugene Domingo, DJ Durano, Nanding Josef, William Lorenzo, Ces Quesada, Ama Quiambao
34	"Chalk"	Andoy Ranay	Maribel Ilag; Ricky Lee	March 31, 2005
Cast: Hilda Koronel, Monina Bagatsing, Perla Bautista, Shamaine Buencamino, Michael De Mesa, Bryan Homecillo, Hazel Ann Mendoza, Geraldine Villamil, Idda Yaneza
35	"Guhit"	Joel Lamangan	Arlene Tamayo	April 7, 2005
Cast: Angelo Caangay, Mario Catalan, Maris Dimayuga, Kristel Fulgar, Jaclyn Jose, Mario Magallona, Mike Magat, Mel Martinez, Jane Oineza, Angelica Panganiban, Dimples Romana, Sharlene San Pedro, Gilleth Sandico, Idda Yaneza
36	"Sanggol"	Lupita Aquino-Kashiwahara	Ronald Carballo	April 14, 2005
Cast: Ku Aquino, Michelle Ayalde, Monina Bagatsing, Noel Colet, Michael De Mesa, Alice Dixson, Heart Evangelista, Gigi Locsin, Gigette Reyes
37	"Bahay-bahayan"	Jerry Lopez Sineneng	Dado C. Lumibao; Bong Ramos	April 21, 2005
Cast: Nash Aguas, Alicia Alonzo, Glaiza De Castro, Joshua Dionisio, Simon Ibarra, Eula Valdes, Gardo Versoza
38	"Bato"	Gilbert Perez	Ruel Montañez	April 28, 2005
Cast: Bobby Andrews, Kathryn Bernardo, Aleck Bovick, Bing Davao, Kathleen Hermosa, Albert Martinez, Camille Prats, Ama Quiambao
39	"Bestida"	Jerry Lopez Sineneng	Maribel Ilag; Dado C. Lumibao	May 5, 2005
Cast: Kaye Abad, Owen Bowen, Michael De Mesa, Jacob Dionisio, AJ Eigenmann, Emilio Garcia, Lester Llansang, Cherry Pie Picache, Biboy Ramirez, Spencer Reyes
40	"Barko"	Rechie Del Carmen	Ruel Montañez	May 12, 2005
Cast: Kristel Fulgar, Tanya Gomez, Gino Paul Guzman, Agot Isidro, Aaron Junatas, Dominic Ochoa, Richard Quan, Snooky Serna, Jodi Sta. Maria
41	"Kuwintas"	FM Reyes	Dado C. Lumibao; Gilbeys Sardea	May 19, 2005
Cast: John Arcilla, Theo Bernardo, Joseph Bitangcol, Ricky Davao, Minda Flores, Jaja Gonzales, Nanding Josef, Boom Labrusca, Sandara Park, Camille Prats
42	"Resort"	Joyce Bernal	Arlene Tamayo	May 26, 2005
Cast: Marvin Agustin, Justin Cuyugan, Angelika Dela Cruz, Lui Manansala, Archie Ventosa
43	"Balisong"	Jerome Chavez Pobocan	Peng Balase; Dado C. Lumibao	June 2, 2005
Cast: Lotlot De Leon, Wowie De Guzman, Kimberly Diaz, Celine Lim, Spanky Manikan, Gigette Reyes, Rejoice Rivera, Empress Schuck, Neil Ryan Sese
44	"Tahanan"	Rechie Del Carmen	Maribel Ilag	June 9, 2005
Cast: Gina Alajar, Kookoo Gonzales, Jhong Hilario, Bembol Roco, Dimples Romana
45	"Typewriter"	Jerry Lopez Sineneng	Jarell Serencio; Jayson Villamor	June 23, 2005
Cast: John Apacible, Mon Confiado, Aiza Marquez, John Wayne Sace, Joel Torre, Ahron Villena

=== Season 14 (2005–2006) ===
#	Episode title	Directed by	Written by	Original air date
1	"Skating Rink"	Gilbert Perez	Maribel Ilag	June 30, 2005
Cast: John Lloyd Cruz, Kiray Celis, Ronalisa Cheng, Noel Colet, Maori David, Rio Locsin
2	"Casa"	Jeffrey Jeturian	Mel Mendoza-Del Rosario	July 7, 2005
Cast: Rica Peralejo, Malou Crisologo, Dexter Doria, Matt Hadfield, Cherry Lou, Grace Murillo, Julia Pacheco, Joanna Marie Tan, Nikka Valencia, Criselda Volks
3	"Hollow Blocks"	Tots Mariscal	Maribel Ilag	July 14, 2005
Cast: Mico Aytona, Gemmae Custodio, Steven Fermo, Flora Gasser, KC Hollman, Melissa Mendez, Ryan Racal, Jerome Sala, Gardo Versoza
4	"Novena"	Nuel C. Naval	Arlene Tamayo	July 21, 2005
Cast: Jean Garcia, Pokwang, Christian Vasquez, Rodel Velayo
5	"Rosaryo" "Rosary"	Jerry Lopez Sineneng	Arlene Tamayo	August 4, 2005
Cast: Judy Ann Santos, Ryan Agoncillo, Tommy Abuel, Dick Israel, Ces Quesada, Jaime Bascon, Jacob Dinosio, Gino Paul Guzman
6	"Panyo" "Handkerchief"	Joyce Bernal	Ruel Montañez	August 11, 2005
Cast: Mark Bautista, Eva Darren, Marianne dela Riva, Boomboom Gonzales, Jaja Gonzales, Nanding Josef, Idda Yaneza
7	"Diary"	Trina N. Dayrit	Dado C. Lumibao; Reggie Amigo	August 25, 2005
Cast: Albert Martinez, Maja Salvador, Ilonah Jean, Alwyn Uytingco, Glazia De Castro, Empress Schuck, Joshua Dionisio
8	"Laptop"	Mae Cruz-Alviar	Maribel Ilag; Dado C. Lumibao	September 1, 2005
Cast: Roxanne Guinoo, Joross Gamboa, William Lorenzo, Debraliz, Tanya Gomez, Theo Bernardos, Rex Agoncillo
9	"Bangka"	Jeffrey Jeturian	Ruel Montañez	September 8, 2005
Cast: Jhong Hilario, Irma Adlawan, Richard Arellano, Ana Capri, Maris Dimayuga, Sarsi Emannuelle, Jess Evardone, Bryan Homecillo, Simon Ibarra, Jiego Malvar, Neri Naig, Tom Olivar, Ruby Rosa, Ashley Silverio
10	"Painting"	John D-Lazatin	Dado C. Lumibao	September 15, 2005
Cast: Susan Africa, Nonie Buencamino, Christel Patricia de Leon, Nikki Desuasido, Geoff Eigenmann, Richgail Enriquez, Ketchup Eusebio, Heart Evangelista, Nicole Fonteras, Irish Fullerton, Alfred Labatos, Enrique Olives, Eliza Pineda, Mark Angelo Wilson
11	"Paru-paro"	Mae Cruz-Alviar	Gilbeys Sardea	September 29, 2005
Cast: Angelica Panganiban, Carlo Aquino, Ku Aquino, Kathryn Bernardo, Ronalisa Cheng, Gemmae Custodio, Mymy Davao, Steven Fermo, Marnie Lapus, Sylvia Sanchez,
12	"Garapon"	Chito S. Roño	Mel Mendoza-Del Rosario	October 6, 2005
Cast: Nash Aguas, Marco Aytona, Niña De Sagun, Mark Anthony Fernandez, Angela Ilagan, Gigi Locsin, Katherine Luna, Elizabeth Oropesa, Crispin Pineda
13	"Eyeglasses"	Rechie Del Carmen	Maribel Ilag	October 20, 2005
Cast: Rico Barrera, Shamaine Buencamino, Tirso Cruz III, Jenny Hernandez, Rio Locsin, Mico Palanca
14	"Family Album"	Jeffrey Jeturian	Arlene Tamayo	October 27, 2005
Cast: Gina Alajar, Michael de Mesa, Mico Aytona, Perla Bautista, Janus Del Prado, Aiza Marquez, Bernard Palanca, CJ Ramos, Dante Rivero
15	"Rosaryo"	Jerry Lopez Sineneng	Shugo Praico; Dado C. Lumibao	November 3, 2005
Cast: Glaiza De Castro, Gardo Versoza, Lotlot De Leon, Bryan Homecillo, Eliza Pineda, Cris Dale, Menggie Cobarrubias, Ermie Concepcion
16	"Fried Chicken"	Nuel C. Naval	Shugo Pracio	November 17, 2005
Cast: Albert Martinez, Kathryn Bernardo, Bing Davao, Jaclyn Jose, Dominic Ochoa, Gigette Reyes, Dimples Romana
17	"Yen"	Jeffrey Jeturian	Ruel Montañez	November 24, 2005
Cast: Anton Bernardo, Nonie Buencamino, Ya Chang, Sherry Lara, Gio Marcelo, Jobelle Salvador, Empress Schuck, Eula Valdes
18	"Dugo"	Unknown	Unknown	December 1, 2005
Cast:
19	"Telebisyon"	Unknown	Unknown	December 15, 2005
Cast:
20	"Kandila"	Unknown	Unknown	December 22, 2005
Cast:
21	"Langis"	Unknown	Unknown	January 5, 2006
Cast:
22	"Radyo"	Unknown	Unknown	January 19, 2006
Cast:
23	"Posas"	Unknown	Unknown	January 26, 2006
Cast:
24	"Scapular"	Unknown	Unknown	February 2, 2006
Cast:
25	"Barya"	Unknown	Unknown	February 9, 2006
Cast:
26	"Salamin"	Unknown	Unknown	February 16, 2006
Cast:
27	"Punda"	Unknown	Unknown	February 23, 2006
Cast:
28	"Elevator"	Unknown	Unknown	March 2, 2006
Cast:
29	"Greeting Card"	Unknown	Unknown	March 16, 2006
Cast:
30	"Orchids"	Unknown	Unknown	March 23, 2006
Cast:
29	"Tubig"	Unknown	Unknown	March 30, 2006
Cast:
31	"Rosas"	Unknown	Unknown	April 20, 2006
Cast:
32	"Medalyang Ginto" "Gold Medal"	Unknown	Unknown	April 27, 2006
Cast:

=== Season 15 (2006–2007) ===
#	Episode title	Directed by	Written by	Original air date
1	"Regalo (Part 1)" "Gift"	Dado C. Lumibao	Olivia M. Lamasan	May 4, 2006
Cast: Vilma Santos, Maja Salvador, Ricky Davao, Erich Gonzales
2	"Regalo (Part 2)" "Gift"	Dado C. Lumibao	Olivia M. Lamasan	May 11, 2006
Cast: Vilma Santos, Maja Salvador, Ricky Davao, Erich Gonzales, Claire Marie Velasco
3	"Kape" "Coffee"	FM Reyes	Ruel Montañez	May 18, 2006
Cast: Anne Curtis, Zanjoe Marudo, Miko Palanca
4	"Gitara" "Guitar"	Mae Czarina Cruz	Arlene Tamayo	May 25, 2006
Cast:
5	"Palamig" "Chill"	Jerry Lopez Sineneng	Ruel Montañez	June 8, 2006
Cast: Gina Alajar, Christopher de Leon
6	"Palaisdaan"	Jerry Lopez Sineneng	Ruel Montañez; Dado C. Lumibao	June 16, 2006
Cast: Bea Alonzo, Bembol Roco, Sylvia Sanchez, Eric Fructuoso
7	"Jeepney"	Chito S. Roño	Shugo Praico	June 23, 2006
Cast: Keanna Reeves, Gardo Versoza
8	"Cap"	Unknown	Unknown	June 30, 2006
Cast:
9	"Manikang Papel"	Unknown	Unknown	July 7, 2006
Cast:
10	"Pansit" "Noodles"	Unknown	Unknown	July 14, 2006
Cast:
11	"Lampara" "Lamp"	Unknown	Unknown	July 21, 2006
Cast:
12	"Love Letters"	Unknown	Unknown	July 28, 2006
Cast:
13	"Piso"	Unknown	Unknown	August 4, 2006
Cast:
14	"Juice"	Jeffrey Jeturian	Maribel Ilag; Dado C. Lumibao	August 11, 2006
Cast: Roderick Paulate, Aiza Seguerra, Cris Villanueva, Aiza Marquez, Gino Paul Guzman, Kris Martinez, Zeppi Borromeo, Eunice Lagusad, Gammy Viray
15	"Swing"	Jerry Lopez Sineneng	Maribel Ilag	August 18, 2006
Cast: Jason Abalos, Judy Ann Santos
16	"Bougainvillea"	Unknown	Unknown	August 25, 2006
Cast:
17	"Manicure Set"	Unknown	Unknown	September 1, 2006
Cast:
18	"Kwintas" "Necklace"	FM Reyes	Ruel Monatañez; Dado C. Lumibao	September 8, 2006
Cast: John Lloyd Cruz, Sarah Geronimo, Allan Paule, Charles Christianson, Melissa Ricks, Eda Nolan
19	"Cake"	Unknown	Unknown	September 22, 2006
Cast:
20	"Chicharon"	Unknown	Unknown	September 29, 2006
Cast:
21	"Poon"	Unknown	Unknown	October 13, 2006
Cast:
22	"Bus"	Nuel C. Naval	Arlene Tamayo; Dado C. Lumibao	October 20, 2006
Cast: Kim Chiu, Gerald Anderson, Rio Locsin, Lito Pimentel, Eliza Pineda, Jodell Stasic, Beverly Salviejo, Simon Ibarra, Timmy Boy Sta. Maria, EJ Jallorina
23	"Switcher"	Unknown	Unknown	October 27, 2006
Cast:
24	"Balabal" "Cloak"	Unknown	Unknown	November 3, 2006
Cast:
25	"Rugby"	Unknown	Unknown	November 10, 2006
Cast:
26	"Korte" "Court"	Unknown	Unknown	November 17, 2006
Cast:
27	"Salamin" "Mirror"	Unknown	Unknown	December 1, 2006
Cast:
28	"Bisikleta" "Bicycle"	Unknown	Unknown	December 8, 2006
Cast:
29	"Shades"	Unknown	Unknown	December 22, 2006
Cast:
30	"Cellphone"	Jeffrey Jeturian	Ruel Montañez; Dado C. Lumibao	January 5, 2007
Cast: Joross Gamboa, Malou De Guzman, Joseph Bitangcol, Jeremiah Rosales, TJ Trinidad, Mico Aytona, IC Mendoza, Jess Evardone
31	"Patalim" "Knife"	Unknown	Unknown	January 12, 2007
Cast:
32	"Airport"	Unknown	Unknown	January 19, 2007
Cast:
33	"Buhangin" "Sand"	Unknown	Unknown	February 2, 2007
Cast:
34	"Jacket"	Unknown	Unknown	February 9, 2007
Cast:
35	"Diary"	Unknown	Unknown	February 16, 2007
Cast:
36	"Singsing"	Unknown	Unknown	February 23, 2007
Cast:
37	"Tako" "Cue"	Unknown	Unknown	March 2, 2007
Cast:
38	"Pocketbook"	Unknown	Unknown	March 9, 2007
Cast:
39	"Maong"	Unknown	Unknown	March 16, 2007
Cast:
40	"Cellphone"	Unknown	Unknown	March 30, 2007
Cast:
41	"Traffic Light"	Unknown	Unknown	April 13, 2007
Cast:
42	"Lapis" "Pencil"	Unknown	Unknown	April 20, 2007
Cast:
43	"Karayom" "Needle"	Unknown	Unknown	April 27, 2007
Cast:

=== Season 16 (2007–2008) ===
#	Episode title	Directed by	Written by	Original air date
1	"Rosaryo" "Rosary"	Unknown	Unknown	May 4, 2007
Cast:
2	"Rehas"	Unknown	Unknown	May 11, 2007
Cast:
3	"Barko" "Ship"	Unknown	Unknown	May 18, 2007
Cast:
4	"Barya" "Coin"	Unknown	Unknown	May 25, 2007
Cast:
5	"Feeding Bottle"	Unknown	Unknown	June 8, 2007
Cast:
6	"Letters"	Unknown	Unknown	June 15, 2007
Cast:
7	"Application Form"	Unknown	Unknown	June 22, 2007
Cast:
8	"Mikropono" "Microphone"	Unknown	Unknown	June 29, 2007
Cast:
9	"Ilog" "River"	Unknown	Unknown	July 6, 2007
Cast:
10	"Blue Rose"	Unknown	Unknown	July 13, 2007
Cast:
11	"Toga"	Unknown	Unknown	July 20, 2007
Cast:
12	"Kwintas" "Necklace"	Unknown	Unknown	July 27, 2007
Cast:
13	"Takatak"	Unknown	Unknown	August 10, 2007
Cast:
14	"CD Player"	Unknown	Unknown	August 17, 2007
Cast:
15	"Yellow Sofa"	Unknown	Unknown	August 24, 2007
Cast:
16	"Balikbayan Box"	Unknown	Unknown	August 31, 2007
Cast:
17	"Telebisyon" "Television"	Unknown	Unknown	September 14, 2007
Cast:
18	"Sako" "Sack"	Unknown	Unknown	September 21, 2007
Cast:
19	"Dream House"	Unknown	Unknown	September 28, 2007
Cast:
20	"Pulang Panyo" "Red Handkerchief"	Unknown	Unknown	October 12, 2007
Cast:
21	"Pilat" "Scar"	Unknown	Unknown	October 19, 2007
Cast:
22	"Tren" "Train"	Unknown	Unknown	October 26, 2007
Cast:
23	"Korona" "Crown"	Unknown	Unknown	November 2, 2007
Cast:
24	"Larawan" "Picture"	Unknown	Unknown	November 9, 2007
Cast:
25	"Sigarilyo" "Cigarette"	Unknown	Unknown	November 23, 2007
Cast:
26	"Burger Stand"	Unknown	Unknown	November 30, 2007
Cast:
27	"Bag"	Unknown	Unknown	December 14, 2007
Cast:
28	"Bisikleta" "Bicycle"	Unknown	Unknown	December 21, 2007
Cast:
29	"Swimming Pool"	Unknown	Unknown	January 4, 2008
Cast:
30	"Hair Clip"	Unknown	Unknown	January 18, 2008
Cast:
31	"Bus"	Unknown	Unknown	January 25, 2008
Cast:
32	"Popcorn"	Jeffrey Jeturian	Ruel Montañez	February 1, 2008
Kat-Kat approximately fell in love with her other guy during the summer carnival near their house, she been make hardship when they fell in love by a boy named Roel a vendor selling some popcorns beside the fair, they usually do what love makes differences affecting their life before puberty, if they since both had trouble meaningful conditions in life, will Kat-Kat make decision as beads of romances endure? Cast: Eliza Pineda, Joshua Dionisio, Lotlot De Leon, Richard Quan, Mymy Davao, Mikylla Ramirez, Steven Fermo, Gemmae Custodio, Chris Gutierrez
33	"Cane"	Unknown	Unknown	February 8, 2008
Cast:
34	"Mansyon" "Mansion"	Unknown	Unknown	February 15, 2008
Cast:
35	"Dalandan"	Unknown	Unknown	February 22, 2008
Cast:
36	"Basura" "Garbage"	Unknown	Unknown	March 7, 2008
Cast:
37	"Bibilya" "Bible"	Nuel C. Naval	Joan Habana	March 14, 2008
Cast: Roxanne Guinoo, Joross Gamboa, Coco Martin, Allan Paule, Jenny Miller, Kathleen Hermosa, Khaycee Aboloc, Bella Padilia, Kenjie Garcia
38	"Journal"	Jeffrey Jeturian	Arah Jell Badayos	March 28, 2008
Cast: Hazel Anne Mendoza, Maja Salvador, Maricel Laxa, Jason Abalos, Gerald Madrid, Dick Israel, Crispin Pineda, Encar Benedicto, Zeppi Borromeo, Chix Alcala, Biboy Ramirez, Lester Llansang
39	"Singsing" "Ring"	Unknown	Unknown	April 4, 2008
Cast:
40	"Sumbrero"	Unknown	Unknown	April 18, 2008
Cast:
41	"Botelya"	Unknown	Unknown	April 25, 2008
Cast:
42	"Taxi"	Unknown	Unknown	May 2, 2008
Cast:
43	"Card"	Unknown	Unknown	May 9, 2008
Cast:
44	"Laruan" "Toy"	Unknown	Unknown	May 23, 2008
Cast:
45	"Dagat" "Sea"	Unknown	Unknown	May 30, 2008
Cast:
46	"Mesa" "Table"	Unknown	Unknown	June 6, 2008
Cast:
47	"Robot"	Unknown	Unknown	June 20, 2008
Cast:
48	"Isda"	Unknown	Unknown	June 27, 2008
Cast:
49	"Bracelet"	Unknown	Unknown	July 11, 2008
Cast:

=== Season 17 (2008–2009) ===
#	Episode title	Directed by	Written by	Original air date
1	"Salamin" "Mirror"	Nuel C. Naval	Shugo Praico; Dado C. Lumibao	July 19, 2008
Cast: Gretchen Barretto
2	"Ice Cream"	Jeffrey Jeturian	Joan Habana; Dado C. Lumibao	July 26, 2008
Cast:
3	"Bituin" "Star"	Mae Czarina Cruz	Shugo Praico; Dado C. Lumibao	August 2, 2008
Cast:
4	"Saging" "Banana"	Don Cuaresma	Ruel Montañez	August 9, 2008
Cast:
5	"Dollhouse"	Dado C. Lumibao	Shugo Praico; Arah Jell Badayos; Dado C. Lumibao	August 16, 2008
Cast: Sarah Geronimo
6	"Larawan" "Picture"	Jeffrey Jeturian	Ruel Montañez; Dado C. Lumibao	August 23, 2008
Cast:
7	"Board Game"	Unknown	Unknown	August 30, 2008
Cast:
8	"Notebook"	Unknown	Unknown	September 13, 2008
Cast:
9	"Pedicab"	Unknown	Unknown	September 20, 2008
Cast:
10	"Sulat" "Write"	Unknown	Unknown	September 27, 2008
Cast:
11	"Sopas"	Unknown	Unknown	October 4, 2008
Cast:
12	"Kalabaw"	Unknown	Unknown	October 11, 2008
Cast:
13	"Kanin" "Rice"	Unknown	Unknown	October 25, 2008
Cast:
14	"Kandila" "Candle"	Unknown	Unknown	November 1, 2008
Cast:
15	"Lupa" "Land"	Unknown	Unknown	November 8, 2008
Cast:
16	"Leather Shoes"	Unknown	Unknown	November 15, 2008
Cast:
17	"Sanggol" "Baby"	Unknown	Unknown	November 22, 2008
Cast:
18	"Gayuma" "Potion"	Unknown	Unknown	December 6, 2008
Cast:
19	"Lason" "Potion"	Unknown	Unknown	December 13, 2008
Cast:
20	"Medyas" "Socks"	Unknown	Unknown	December 20, 2008
Cast:
21	"Pregnancy Kit"	Unknown	Unknown	January 3, 2009
Cast:
22	"Boarding House"	Unknown	Unknown	January 17, 2009
Cast:
23	"Taxi"	Unknown	Unknown	January 24, 2009
Cast:
24	"Bisikleta" "Bicycle"	Unknown	Unknown	January 31, 2009
Cast:
25	"Pendant"	Unknown	Unknown	February 14, 2009
Cast:
26	"Bola" "Ball"	Unknown	Unknown	February 21, 2009
Cast:
27	"Blusa" "Blouse"	Unknown	Unknown	February 28, 2009
Cast:
28	"Transistor"	Unknown	Unknown	March 7, 2009
Cast:
29	"Tasa" "Cup"	Unknown	Unknown	March 21, 2009
Cast:
30	"Pedicab"	Unknown	Unknown	March 28, 2009
Cast:
31	"Lambat" "Net"	Unknown	Unknown	April 4, 2009
Cast:
32	"Chess"	Unknown	Unknown	April 18, 2009
Cast:
33	"Bulaklak" "Flower"	Unknown	Unknown	April 25, 2009
Cast:
34	"Reseta" "Prescription"	Unknown	Unknown	May 9, 2009
Cast:
35	"Soccer Ball"	Unknown	Unknown	May 16, 2009
Cast:
36	"Wheelchair"	Jeffrey Jeturian	Mary Rose Colindres; Dado C. Lumibao	May 23, 2009
Cast:
37	"Medal for Valor"	Unknown	Unknown	May 30, 2009
Cast:
38	"Bench"	Unknown	Unknown	June 13, 2009
Cast:
39	"Tattoo"	Unknown	Unknown	June 20, 2009
Cast:
40	"Diary"	Unknown	Unknown	June 27, 2009
Cast:
41	"Singsing"	Jeffrey Jeturian	Mark Duane Angos; Dado C. Lumibao	July 11, 2009
Cast:
42	"Kalendaryo" "Calendar"	Nuel C. Naval	Shugo Praico; Dado C. Lumibao	July 18, 2009
Cast:
43	"Karnabal"	Jeffrey Jeturian	Maribel Ilag; Dado C. Lumibao	July 25, 2009
Cast:
