= Jay Cayuca =

Filipino musician

Jay Cayuca (born 1963 in Butuan), is a professional violinist in the Philippines.

Coming from a musically inclined family, he first studied the piano at 6 years old. He later began studying the saxophone but stopped because of a medical condition. After seeing violinist Ronni Rogoff play on the television, he decided to shift to the violin.

He studied at the University of Santo Tomas, under the tutelage of Basilio Manalo, Leonidas Domingo, and Luis Valencia. He initially focused on playing classical music, but later shifted to jazz and pop music.
