= Eigenmann =

Eigenmann (German pronunciation: [ˈaɪ̯ɡ(ə)nman]) (Tagalog pronunciation: [ˈaɪɡɛnmɐn]) is a surname. Notable persons with that surname include:

- Andi Eigenmann (born 1990), Filipino actress
- Carl H. Eigenmann (1863–1927), German–American ichthyologist, husband of Rosa Eigenmann
- Eduardo de Mesa Eigenmann, birth name of Eddie Mesa (born 1940), Filipino actor and singer, father of Michael de Mesa, Mark Gil and Cherie Gil
- Evangeline Rose Gil Eigenmann, birth name of Cherie Gil (1963–2022), Filipino actress, sister of Michael de Mesa and Mark Gil
- Gabby Eigenmann (born 1978), Filipino actor, son of Mark Gil
- Geoff Eigenmann (born 1985), Filipino actor, son of Michael de Mesa and Gina Alajar, brother of Ryan Eigenmann
- Max Eigenmann (born 1987), Filipino actress
- Michael Edward Gil Eigenmann, birth name of Michael de Mesa (born 1960), Filipino actor, brother of Mark Gil and Cherie Gil
- Raphael John Gil Eigenmann, birth name of Mark Gil (1961–2014), Filipino actor, brother of Michael de Mesa and Cherie Gil
- Rosa Smith Eigenmann (1848–1947), American ichthyologist, wife of Carl Eigenmann
- Ma. Rosa Francisca Catalina Castellvi Gil-Eigenmann, marital name of Rosemarie Gil (born 1942), Filipino actress, wife of Eddie Mesa, and mother of Michael de Mesa, Mark Gil, and Cherie Gil
- Ryan Eigenmann (born 1978), Filipino actor, son of Michael de Mesa and Gina Alajar, brother of Geoff Eigenmann
- Timothy Mark Eigenmann, birth name of Sid Lucero (born 1981), Filipino actor, son of Mark Gil
