= Geoff Eigenmann =

Filipino actor, model and television presenter (born 1985)

- Born: Geoffrey Michael Alatiit Eigenmann; March 23, 1985 (age 41); Parañaque, Philippines
- Other names: Jeff
- Education: Shekinah Christian Training Center
- Occupations: Actor; model; television presenter
- Years active: 1992–present
- Agent: Star Magic (1992–present)
- Height: 1.73 m (5 ft 8 in)
- Spouse: Maya Flores (m. 2022)
- Children: 3
- Parent(s): Michael de Mesa; Gina Alajar
- Family: Eigenmann family

Geoffrey Michael Alatiit Eigenmann (Tagalog: [ˈaɪɡɛnmɐn]; born March 23, 1985) is a Filipino actor and model. He is notable for his performances in television; he is a member of the Eigenmann family of actors. He is a son of actor and director Michael De Mesa.

== Biography ==
Eigenmann is the third generation member of the Eigenmann family. His grandparents are musician Eddie Mesa and actress Rosemarie Gil. He is the son of Filipino actors Michael de Mesa and Gina Alajar. He has two siblings who are also actors: An older brother Ryan Eigenmann and younger brother AJ Eigenmann. Geoff is the nephew of actors Mark Gil and Cherie Gil, and he is the cousin of actors Gabby Eigenmann, Sid Lucero (legal name: Timothy Eigenmann), Andi Eigenmann, and Max Eigenmann.

=== Early career ===
Eigenmann's first TV appearance was a kid-teen oriented comedy gag show Ang TV on ABS-CBN in 1992.

=== Education ===
Eigenmann attended International Christian Academy for middle school, as did his brother Ryan. Eigenmann graduated high school from Shekinah Christian Training Center in March 2002.

=== Hosting ===
Aside from Rosalinda, Eigenmann has co-hosted ASAP and a reality variety talent show Palmolive Shining Circle Of 10 Batch 2008 on ABS-CBN; then he hosted as a VJ of MYX from 2005 to 2007. Geoff transferred to GMA Network and he hosted SOP Rules from 2008 to 2010 and a former mainstay host Party Pilipinas on GMA Network from 2010 to 2013.

== Career ==
=== TV career ===
Eigenmann went back in his home network GMA Network via SRO Cinemaserye in June 2008.

The SRO Cinemaserye: Ganti Ng Puso ended in 2009 and he was supposed to appear again via Sine Novela: Kung Aagawin Mo ang Lahat sa Akin but he was replaced by JC Tiuseco to work with Maxene Magalona.

In 2009, he played the role of Fernando Jose, leading man to Carla Abellana, in the Philippine version of Rosalinda.

He played the role of Kevin Rodriguez in SRO Cinemaserye, along with his on-screen sweetheart Carla Abellana. They will work for the second time with their parents, Rey "PJ" Abellana and Gina Alajar.

Eigenmann was part of a reality show with his partner Carla Abellana for their newest GMA Christmas reality show, Puso ng Pasko: Artista Challenge. Geoff's former loveteam and long-time friend Heart Evangelista was paired with newcomer Ervic Vijandre. This was Geoff and Carla's fifth time together.

Eigenmann is also a part of Sine Novela Presents: Basahang Ginto with his partner, Carla Abellana, it was aired on GMA Network.

In 2011, Eigenmann was also part of a fantasy comedy together again with his partner, Carla Abellana for their team up again in Magic Palayok. This was their fourth time to work since their drama mini series, Basahang Ginto a Sine Novela show on GMA Network.

In 2012, Eigenmann paired with his former love team Heart Evangelista in a GMA Network drama, Legacy. This was their reunion after working individually for a long time. Also the same year, Geoff also became a part of former drama series on daytime, Kasalanan Bang Ibigin Ka? with his co-stars Jackie Rice, Jennica Garcia and his real life father Michael de Mesa.

In 2016 and 2018, Eigenmann went back to ABS-CBN as he returns to GMA Network in 2017. Today, he is now a freelance artist.

In 2019, he joined The Killer Bride starring Villa Estrella co-star Maja Salvador. In 2021, he joins the casts of FPJ's Ang Probinsyano as the main villain Albert de Vela.

=== Movie career ===
Eigenmann's first movie was Batang X via Regal Entertainment in 1995. Eigenmann was a contract star of Star Cinema. His second movie was Bcoz Of U with his then-girlfriend Heart Evangelista. His third movie was the comedy First Day High, based on a deodorant commercial for Rexona with his Kapamilya stars Kim Chiu, Gerald Anderson, Jason Abalos, Carla Humpries and Maja Salvador.

His fourth movie and his first indie film was Anak Ni Brocka with the late hip hop artist Francis Magalona in 2005. His fifth movie was For the First Time with fellow Kapuso star Richard Gutierrez and Kapamilya Star KC Concepcion. His sixth and last movie for Star Cinema was the horror Villa Estrella with Maja Salvador, Shaina Magdayao and John Estrada.

He is a former contract star with GMA Films, his seventh movie and first movie for GMA Films was Ang Panday with fellow Kapuso stars Sen. Bong Revilla, Buboy Villar and Rhian Ramos. A co-production with Imus Productions, Ang Panday was part of the 2009 Metro Manila Film Festival where the movie won as "1st Place Best Festival Picture".

== Personal life ==
He married his longtime partner Maya Flores on February 22, 2022. They have three children, Arabella "Beanie" Simone, born on September 23, 2017, Augustus "Angus" Geoffrey, born on June 15, 2019 and Penelope "Pepper" Rose, born on October 31, 2020.

== Filmography ==
=== Film ===
Year	Title	Role
1995	Batang-X	Philips (credited as Geoffrey Eigenmann)
2004	Bcuz of U	Roni
2005	Anak Ni Brocka	Roni
2006	First Day High	Rebel Gael Zantua
2008	For the First Time	Tristan
2009	Villa Estrella	Dennis
2009	Ang Panday	Celso

=== Television ===
Year	Title	Role
1992	Ang TV	Himself
1999–2001	Kirara, Ano ang Kulay ng Pag-ibig?	Joshua
2002	Kahit Kailan	
2003	Love to Love: Yaya Lovely	Nonoy
2004–2005	Hiram	Harry Silayan / Andrew
2004–2008; 2019–present	ASAP	Himself/Performer
2004–2007	MYX	VJ
2005	Ikaw ang Lahat sa Akin	Ricardo "Third" Fernando III
2006	Star Magic Presents: Love And The City	Sonny
2006	Komiks Presents: Da Adventures of Pedro Penduko	Elias
2006	Your Song Presents: If I Keep My Heart Out of Sight	
2007	Rounin	Xyrus
2007	Sineserye Presents: Hiram na Mukha	Mendez Pedrosa
2007	Komiks Presents: Si Pedro Penduko at ang mga Engkantao	Elias
2008	Lobo	Alec Aragon / Remus
2008	Maalaala Mo Kaya	Various
2008	Love Spell Presents: Face Shop	Alvin
2008	Palmolive Shining Circle of 10: Batch 2008	Host
2009	Bleach	Ichigo Kurosaki
2009–2010	SOP Rules	Co-host
2009	SRO Cinemaserye: Ganti Ng Puso	Kevin Rodriguez
2009	Maynila	Various
2009	Rosalinda	Fernando Jose Altamirano
2009	SRO Cinemaserye: Carinderia Queen	Romeo
2010–2013	Party Pilipinas	Co-host/Performer
2010	The Last Prince	Prince Javino / Froggy
2010	Claudine Presents: Fraternity	Migs
2010	Sine Novela: Basahang Ginto	Danny Vergara
2010	Show Me Da Manny	Jejemonyo
2010	Puso ng Pasko: Artista Challenge	Challenger
2010–2011	Grazilda	Eric Dominguez
2011	Beauty Queen	Judge
2011	Magic Palayok	Richard "Jude" Cruz
2011	Spooky Nights Presents: Sapi	Paolo Almeda
2012	Legacy	Joshua "Josh" Castillo
2012	Kasalanan Bang Ibigin Ka?	Jake/Joaquin Montelibano
2013	Forever	Ramon / Patrick
2013	Wagas	Atty. Narciso "Jun" Santiago Jr.
2013–2014	Adarna	Migo Salva
2014	Seasons Of Love Presents: I Do, I Don't	Aaron
2015	Kailan Ba Tama ang Mali?	Leonardo "Leo" Vasquez
2015	Magpakailanman: Sabit-sabit, Kabit-kabit - Mga Pusong Malupit	George
2015	Dangwa	Mike
2016	Magpakailanman: BFF Kong Duwende	Nando
2016	Ipaglaban Mo: Tapat	Dan
2016	Be My Lady	Doc Joselito Mariano
2017	Maalaala Mo Kaya: Stroller Bag	Red
2017	Ipaglaban Mo: Taksil	Ron Borromeo
2017	Imbestigador	Niño Rey Boniel
2017	Wish Ko Lang: Matador	Jared
2017	Tadhana: Exit Point	Axel
2017	All Star Videoke	Himself/ Player
2018	Contessa	Gabriel Caballero
2018	Precious Hearts Romances Presents: Los Bastardos	young Don Roman Cardinal
2019	Ipaglaban Mo: Labandera	Rogelio
2019	Hinahanap-Hanap Kita	Lawrence
2019–2020	The Killer Bride	Vito Dela Cuesta
2020	Ipaglaban Mo: Saleslady	Joseph
2020	Ang Daigdig Ko'y Ikaw	Romer
2021–2022	FPJ's Ang Probinsyano	P/Maj. Albert De Vela
2024–2025	Ang Himala ni Niño	Alfie
2025	It's Okay to Not Be Okay	young Samuel Hernandez
2025	What Lies Beneath	Michael "Mike" Quintana
2026	Blood vs Duty	Oliver Lapeña
