= Gangland (film) =

1998 gangster film by Peque Gallaga and Lore Reyes

- Directed by: Peque Gallaga; Lore Reyes
- Screenplay by: Lore Reyes; Erik Matti
- Story by: Henry Nadong; Gabriel Fernandez; Erik Matti
- Produced by: Vincent Del Rosario III
- Starring: Ryan Eigenmann; Jason Salcedo; Junell Hernando; Justin Simoy
- Cinematography: Richard Padernal
- Edited by: Danny Gloria
- Music by: Toto Gentica
- Production company: Tikbalang Productions
- Distributed by: Neo Films
- Release date: September 18, 1998
- Running time: 96 minutes
- Country: Philippines
- Languages: Filipino; English

Gangland is a 1998 Philippine action gangster film directed by Peque Gallaga and Lore Reyes and written by Reyes and Erik Matti from a story concept developed by Matti, Henry Nadong, and Gabriel Fernandez. The film stars Ryan Eigenmann, Jason Salcedo, Junell Hernando and Justin Simoy.

== Plot ==
Kano, Orson, Tinto, and Dodge are members of a fraternity gang engaged in petty crimes. Their lives take a different turn when they stumble into a syndicate led by Banjo and get themselves involved in a drug deal gone wrong.

Soon after, a television crew caught the wild-goose chase between the two gangs and sensationalized the drama unfolding before their viewers. As Kano and his gang hold on to their dear lives, their different backgrounds will soon reveal the real reason they chose a dangerous and unruly path.

== Cast ==
Main cast

- Ryan Eigenmann as Kano
- Jason Salcedo as Orson
- Junell Hernando as Tinto
- Justin Simoy as Dodge
- Lara Fabregas as Tessa Tulfo
- Blakdyak as Banjo
- Gabby Eigenmann as Dicky
- Jeffrey Tam as Leo
- Mad Killah as Clayton
- Erwin Mendoza as Kirk
- Michelle Rufo as Egay
- Mai-Mai Montelibano as Barbara
- Charmaine Palermo as Mahal
- John Arceo as Rock
- Angela Zamora as Lara
- Niño Muhlach as Angie
- Sylvia Sanchez as Gigi
- Tess Dumpit as Mitos
- Mario Taguiwalo as Tiyo Lino
- Noel Trinidad as Chua
- Josie Galvez as Rock's Mother
- Madeleine Gallaga as Orson's Grandma
- Jomari Uy as Nestor
- Aiza Marquez as Dodge's Sister
- Boy Salvador as Berting
- Amy Robles as Tinto's Mother
- Michael Arguelles as Tinto's Brother
- Dianne Sandico as Girl in the Rain
- James Montelibano as Alice

Guest cast

- Alf Alacapa as Use Pardon in a Sentence
- Mel Kimura as Social Welfare Woman
- Checcs Osmeña as Patring
- Marilu Santamaria as Miss Yazon
- Maricor Fortun as Aling Atang
- Nestor Yadao as General Nestor Torres
- Milton Dionzon as Tinok
- Jo Macasa as Lotus
- Erik Matti as Re-enactment Actor
- Teofe Alanano as Re-enactment Actor
- Boy Dolores as Re-enactment Actor
- Rustum Valero as Re-enactment Actor
- Gabriel Fernandez as Re-enactment Actor
- Gary Marzo as Re-enactment Actor
- Kale Abracia as Re-enactment Actor
- Mark Gil as Ralph Eigenmann
- Ian Veneracion as Father Tunggol
- Ramon Christopher as Botchok
- Michael de Mesa as Director
- Edu Manzano as Himself
- Manuel Benito as Manicurist
- Christopher Padilla as Security Guard
