= May Bukas Pa =

May Bukas Pa may refer to:

- May Bukas Pa, a Philippine TV series from 2000 to 2001
- May Bukas Pa, a Philippine TV series from 2009 to 2013
- May Bukas Pa, a song by Rico J. Puno
