= Eigenmann family =

Filipino family of entertainers

- Filipino acting family
- Country: Philippines
- Current region: National Capital Region, Philippines
- Origin: Manila, Philippine Commonwealth
- Members: See table below

The Eigenmann family (Tagalog pronunciation: [ˈaɪɡɛnmɐn]) is a Filipino family of entertainers.

== List of members ==
1. Eddie Mesa
  1. ∞ married Rosemarie Gil; they had three children
    1. Michael de Mesa
      1. ∞ married Gina Alajar (first wife, annulled), had three children
        1. Ryan Eigenmann
        2. AJ Eigenmann
        3. Geoff Eigenmann
      2. ∞ married Julie Reyes
    2. Mark Gil
      1. with Irene Celebre fathered
        1. Gabby Eigenmann
        2. Ira Eigenmann
      2. ∞ married actress Bing Pimentel (first wife, annulled), had two children
        1. Sid Lucero
        2. Max Eigenmann
      3. with actress Jaclyn Jose had:
        1. Andi Eigenmann
          1. with Jake Ejercito had
            1. Ellie Eigenmann
          2. with Philmar Alipayo, had two children: Keliana and Koa.
            1. Lilo
            2. Koa
      4. ∞ married Maricar Jacinto, they had one child: Stephanie.
    3. Cherie Gil
      1. ∞ married Rony Rogoff, they have three children: Bianca, Enrique and Raphael.
      2. with Leo Martinez, they have one child: Jay.
