= Ryan Eigenmann =

Filipino actor, model and television presenter

- Born: Ryan Richard Alatiit Eigenmann; Parañaque, Philippines
- Occupations: Actor, model, host
- Years active: 1989–present
- Agent: June Rufino
- Television: GMA Network; ABS-CBN; TV5; Radio Philippines Network (RPN); Intercontinental Broadcasting Corporation (IBC)
- Spouse: Cathy Bordalba (m. 2010)
- Children: 3
- Parent(s): Michael de Mesa; Gina Alajar
- Family: Eigenmann family

Ryan Richard Alatiit Eigenmann (Tagalog: [ˈɾajɐn ˈaɪɡɛnmɐn]) is a Filipino actor.

== Early life and education ==
Ryan Richard Alatiit Eigenmann is one of the third generation of the Mesa-Gil clan of actors. He is the son of Filipino actors Michael de Mesa and Gina Alajar. His father has Swiss German American and Spanish ancestry and his mother is of part Chinese descent. His grandparents are musician Eddie Mesa and actress Rosemarie Gil. He is the nephew of Filipino actors Cherie and Mark Gil. He has two younger brothers who are also actors, Geoff and AJ.

Eigenmann studied at Montessori, International Christian Academy and De La Salle–College of Saint Benilde.

== Career ==
Eigenmann began his career at the age of 11, starring in the GMA television sitcom Family 1+3 alongside Helen Vela and Princess Punzalan from 1989 to 1993.

In 2004, he was originally meant to star alongside Derek Dee in the film Me King, directed by Toto Natividad for Apache Films, but the project did not come to fruition. In 2005, Eigenmann was originally cast in the lead role of the independent crime film Big Time, but due to conflicts in his schedule, the role went to Winston Elizalde while Eigenmann was given a smaller guest role. On December 1, 2007, Eigenmann hosted the awards night for the Cinema One Originals Digital Film Festival alongside Heart Evangelista.

== Personal life ==
Eigenmann is married to Cathy Bordalba, a TV host and former commercial model. Their wedding took place on February 28, 2010, in Coconut Palace. They have three children.

Eigenmann is the cousin of Sid Lucero.

== Filmography ==
=== Film ===
Year	Title	Role	Note(s)	Ref(s).
1998	I'm Sorry, My Love	Dennis		
1998	Gangland	Kano		
1998	Jose Rizal	Fernando		
1999	Sumigaw Ka Hanggang Gusto Mo!	Jake		
1999	Ekis	Emman		
1999	Unfaithful Wife 2: Sana'y Huwag Akong Maligaw	Archie		
1999	Asin at Paminta	Pat. Brando		
2001	Hubog	Rodney		
2003	Lastikman	Ryan / disguise of Lastikman		
2003	Keka	Bobby Domingo		
2003	1st Time			
2004	Kulimlim	Judeo Lihan (ex-convict)		
2004	Milan	Perry		
2005	Big Time			
2005	Anak ng Tinapa			
2005	Pinoy/Blonde			
2005	The Great Raid	Refugee profiter		
2006	Co-ed Scandal	Leo		
2007	The Promise	Jason		
2007	Baliw	Angelo Martinez		
2007	Doble Vista	Anton		
2007	Hide and Seek	Gener Butag		
2007	Desperadas	Atty. James LaMadrid		
2008	100	Emil		
2008	Baler	2nd Lt. Saturnino Martin Cerezo		
2009	Ang Beerhouse	Noynoy		
2009	Nieves			
2009	Mano Po 6: A Mother's Love	Gino		
2010	Miss You Like Crazy	Nick		
2011	Tumbok	Mark		
2011	In the Name of Love	Homer Evelino		
2012	Every Breath U Take	Mario		
2012	The Healing	Julius		
2013	Pedro Calungsod: Batang Martir	Choco		
2014	Mulat	Vince	English title: Awaken	
2015	Felix Manalo	Pastor		
2016	Lumayo Ka Nga sa Akin	Pundit	Segment: "Shake, Shaker, Shakest"	
2018	Jacqueline Comes Home	Sonny		
2020	Magikland	Ilian		
2022	Leonor Will Never Die	Ricardo		
2023	Voltes V: Legacy – The Cinematic Experience	Zu Zander		

=== Television / digital series ===
Year	Title	Role	Notes	Network	Ref(s).
1989–1993	Family 3+1			GMA Network	
1999	Kirara, Ano ang Kulay ng Pag-ibig?	Bulik	Book 1	GMA Network	
1999	Pintados	Katana		GMA Network	
2000	May Bukas Pa	Dave		IBC / RPN	
2001	Maalaala Mo Kaya		Episode: "Kadena"	ABS-CBN	
2001	Multo sa Calle 13		Television movie; part of GMA Telesine Specials	GMA Network	
2001	Sana ay Ikaw na Nga	Leroy Zalameda		GMA Network	
2003	Magpakailanman		Episode: "Bonnet"	GMA Network	
2004	Te Amo, Maging Sino Ka Man	Edwin Camacho		GMA Network	
2004	Maalaala Mo Kaya	Joel	Episode Guest: "Kutsilyo"	ABS-CBN	
2005	Daisy Siete: Ang Pitong Maria	Rafael		GMA Network	
2005	Etheria: Ang Ikalimang Kaharian ng Encantadia	Marvus		GMA Network	
2005	Mga Anghel Na Walang Langit	Alex†	Supporting cast / antagonist	ABS-CBN	
2006	Captain Barbell	Abel		GMA Network	
2006	Maalaala Mo Kaya		Episode: "Switcher"	ABS-CBN	
2006	Komiks Presents: Da Adventures of Pedro Penduko	Wak-Wak		ABS-CBN	
2006	Komiks Presents: Nasaan Ka Maruja?	Jimmy		ABS-CBN	
2006	Maging Sino Ka Man	Brian Antonio		ABS-CBN	
2007	Kokey	Nicassio Allegre / Korokoy	Supporting cast / antagonist	ABS-CBN	
2007	Maalaala Mo Kaya	Phillip	Episode: "Traffic Light"	ABS-CBN	
2008	Lobo	Anton Rivero	Supporting cast / antagonist	ABS-CBN	
2008	Maalaala Mo Kaya	Greg	Episode: "Larawan"	ABS-CBN	
2009	Ang Babaeng Hinugot sa Aking Tadyang	Enrico dela Cruz		GMA Network	
2009	Obra: Suspetsa	Chris		GMA Network	
2009	Maalaala Mo Kaya	Joel	Episode: "Apron"	ABS-CBN	
2009	Maalaala Mo Kaya	Xander	Episode: "Pendant"	ABS-CBN	
2009	May Bukas Pa	Carlo	Guest cast / protagonist	ABS-CBN	
2009	Agimat: Ang Mga Alamat ni Ramon Revilla	Big Max	Episode: "Tiagong Akyat"	ABS-CBN	
2010–2011	Misteryo	Himself (host)		GMA Network	
2010	Carlo J. Caparas's Panday Kids	Andreas		GMA Network	
2010	Maalaala Mo Kaya	Dante	Episode: "Toy Car"	ABS-CBN	
2010–2011	Jillian: Namamasko Po!	Rico		GMA Network	
2011	Machete	Karum		GMA Network	
2011–2012	Amaya	Angaway		GMA Network	
2012	Biritera	Dalton "Mr. D" Dimaano†	Supporting cast / anti-hero / protagonist	GMA Network	
2012	Magdalena: Anghel sa Putikan	Baron Villa De Asis		GMA Network	
2013	Magpakailanman	Renee Dela Rosa	Episode: "Pusong Bato"	GMA Network	
2013	Indio	Sidapa		GMA Network	
2013	Magpakailanman	Leandro	Episode: "Batang Ina"	GMA Network	
2013	Pyra: Babaeng Apoy	Daniel Del Fierro†	Supporting cast / antagonist	GMA Network	
2014	Kambal Sirena	Enrique Villanueva†	Guest cast / antagonist	GMA Network	
2014	Magpakailanman	Cirilo	Episode: "Ang Huling Dasal ng Isang Ina"	GMA Network	
2014	Magpakailanman	Rudy	Episode: "Sinapupunang Paupahan"	GMA Network	
2014	Magpakailanman	Ely	Episode: "Ang Nurse Na May Ikatlong Mata"	GMA Network	
2014–2016	The Half Sisters	Alfred Alcantara / Damon Sarmiento	418 episodes Credited as "Ryan Eigenman"	GMA Network	
2016	Magpakailanman	Eric	Episode: "Zumba Dancing Boy"	GMA Network	
2016	Encantadia	Berto		GMA Network	
2016	Magpakailanman	Eddie	Episode: "You and Me Against the World"	GMA Network	
2016	Oh, My Mama!	Efren Ynares†	Supporting cast / antagonist	GMA Network	
2017	Impostora	Dr. Jeremy Soriano	Supporting cast / antagonist	GMA Network	
2017	Magpakailanman	Hilario	Episode: "Drug Mule sa China: Ang Inang Biktima ng Sindikato"	GMA Network	
2017	Wish Ko Lang	Noli	Main cast / antagonist	GMA Network	
2017	Magpakailanman	Angelo	Episode: "Ang Puso ng Isang Guro"	GMA Network	
2018	Bagani	Sarimaw	Supporting cast / primary antagonist	ABS-CBN	
2018	Ipaglaban Mo	Rico Viray	Episode: "Tapang"	ABS-CBN	
2018	FPJ's Ang Probinsyano	Gascon Dela Vega	Guest cast / antagonist	ABS-CBN	
2019	Tadhana	Joe	Episode: "Sanib"	GMA Network	
2019	Ipaglaban Mo	Gaspar	Episode: "Higanti"	ABS-CBN	
2020	Almost Paradise	El Diablo	Supporting cast / antagonist	WGN America; Kapamilya Channel; A2Z	
2021	Owe My Love	Dr. Jim "Coops" Cooper	Supporting cast / protagonist	GMA Network	
2022	Widows' Web	Alexander "Xander / AS3" Sagrado III	Guest cast / antagonist	GMA Network	
2022–2023	The Iron Heart	Adonis Salvador	Main cast / antagonist	Kapamilya Channel / A2Z; TV5	
2023	Abot-Kamay na Pangarap	Arman Tinio†	Guest cast / antagonist	GMA Network	
2023	Voltes V: Legacy	Baron Zander	Supporting cast / antagonist	GMA Network	
2023	Cattleya Killer	Gene Rivera	Supporting cast / antagonist	Amazon Prime Video	
2023	ASAP Natin 'To	Himself (occasional guest)		Kapamilya Channel / A2Z; TV5	
2023	Magpakailanman	Leo	Episode: "The Lost Boy"	GMA Network	
2023–2024	Senior High	Darius Soledad	Supporting cast / protagonist / antagonist	Kapamilya Channel / iWantTFC	
2023–2024	Black Rider	Dante Aguilero† (Cong. Marcelo's Son)	Guest cast / antagonist	GMA Network	
2024	Asawa ng Asawa Ko	Franco	Guest cast / antagonist	GMA Network	
2024	Pamilya Sagrado	Lorenzo Joaquin	Guest cast / antagonist	Kapamilya Channel	
2024–2025	Walang Matigas Na Pulis sa Matinik Na Misis	Rico	Guest cast / antagonist	GMA Network	
2025	Incognito	Eugene Escalera / Clover	Guest cast / antagonist	Kapamilya Channel	
2026	Rainbow Rumble	Himself (contestant)		Kapamilya Channel / A2Z; ALLTV	
2026	The Secrets of Hotel 88	Andy Arellano	Supporting cast / anti-hero	GMA Network / iWant	
2026	Blood vs Duty	Col. Napoleon Marcelino		Kapamilya Channel / A2Z; ALLTV	
2026	Someone, Someday	Dino Escalante		Kapamilya Channel; A2Z; ALLTV; TV5	

== Awards and nominations ==
Year	Award-giving body	Category	Work	Result	Ref(s).
1999	15th PMPC Star Awards for Movies	New Movie Actor of the Year	Gangland	Won	
1999	22nd Gawad Urian Awards	Best Actor	Gangland	Nominated	
2000	17th FAP Awards	Best Supporting Actor	Unfaithful Wife 2: Sana'y Huwag Akong Maligaw	Nominated	
2005	23rd Luna Awards	Best Supporting Actor	Milan	Nominated	
2008	24th PMPC Star Awards for Movies	Movie Actor of the Year	Baliw	Nominated	
2008	22nd PMPC Star Awards for Television	Best Drama Actor	Lobo	Nominated	
2015	6th ENPRESS Golden Screen TV Awards	Outstanding Supporting Actor	The Half Sisters	Nominated	
