= Gabby Eigenmann =

Filipino actor, singer, model and television presenter (born 1978)

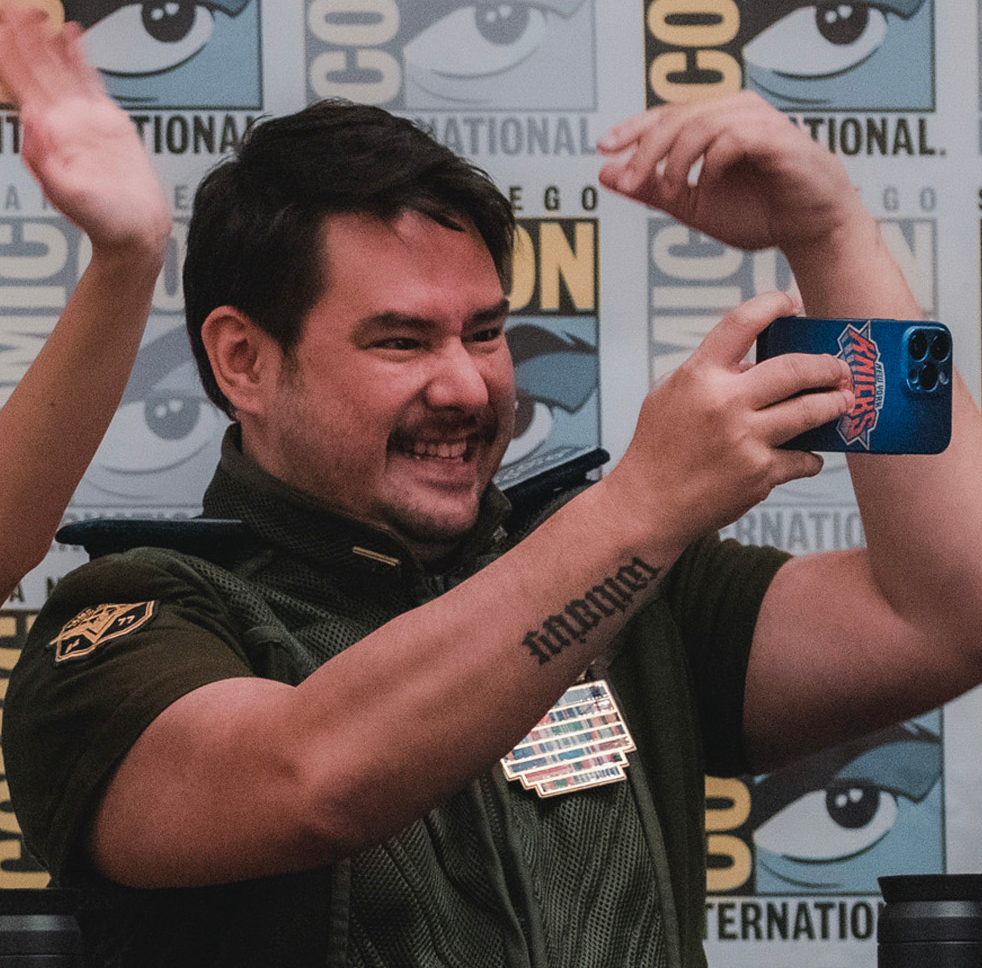
- Eigenmann at the 2023 San Diego Comic-Con
- Born: Gabriel John Celebre Eigenmann; March 2, 1978 (age 48); Makati, Philippines
- Other names: Gab, Gabby
- Occupations: Actor, singer, model
- Years active: 1989–present
- Agent: PPL Entertainment Inc.
- Parents: Mark Gil (father); Irene Celebre (mother)
- Family: Eigenmann family

Gabriel John Celebre Eigenmann (Tagalog: [ˈgabɪ ˈaɪɡɛnmɐn]; born March 2, 1978) is a Filipino actor, singer, host and model. He is currently working as an exclusive talent of GMA Network.

== Background ==
He was born on March 2, 1978, in Makati, Philippines. Gabby hails from the Eigenmann family of famous actors. He is the son of actor Mark Gil to the '80s commercial model/actress Irene Celebre. He is also the nephew of Cherie Gil and Michael de Mesa, the grandson of veteran actors Rosemarie Gil and Eddie Mesa, the cousin of AJ Eigenmann, Ryan Eigenmann and Geoff Eigenmann, he is the older brother of Katherine "Ira" Eigenmann, and the half brother of Sid Lucero (Tim Eigenmann), Maxine and Andrea "Andi" Eigenmann.

== Career ==
=== Acting career ===
He grew up in a prominent family of actors. Entering show business was out of his mind, as he preferred being a pilot, a businessman, a cook, or a restauranteur. He took up two-year program in Hotel and Restaurant Management at OB Montessori. But acting was in his blood. He started his career at the age of 16. He was once a Regal Films’ teen star along with the Gwapings and other rosters of teen actors. He considered Richard Gomez and Regine Velasquez as his role models.

In 1997 when he became one of the hosts of GMA Network's Sunday noontime musical-variety show SOP (Sobrang Okay Pare!) along with Janno Gibbs, Ogie Alcasid and Vina Morales.

After playing teeny-bop and goody-good roles in several TV series, Gabby later discover his knack for villainy and eventually appeared on a range of primetime offerings. His first anti-hero role in on Angelika dela Cruz-Sunshine Dizon starrer Umulan Man o Umaraw in 2000 as he played the role of Nick, the submissive and scheming suitor of Rebecca (Sunshine Dizon). But his notable roles as a villain are in the top-rating Philippine adaptation of MariMar where he played the role of Nicandro Mejia and Munting Heredera where he played the role of Desmond Montreal. In 2010, he played the role and antagonist for Marian Rivera (Jenny) as the good-for-nothing brother Jojo in the Philippine adaptation of Endless Love (based on Autumn in My Heart). His portrayal for latter role gives him a Best Supporting Actor in a Drama Series award via ENPRESS Golden Screen Awards 2011.

After doing mostly anti-hero roles in, GMA Network entrusts him with the lead role in the GMA Afternoon Prime series Broken Vow opposite Bianca King whom he is working for the first time. And later in 2014, Gabby starred in his main role of Dading, together with Glaiza de Castro, Benjamin Alves and Chynna Ortaleza.

=== Singing career ===
After few years doing acting, Eigenmann ventured into a new field of interest which is singing. While his family members marvelled the audience with their acting skills, Gabby likewise wowed the aficionados with his harmonious voice and distinct talent. This new venture allowed him to be recognized more as a singer than an actor. This was his turning point of his career after he bagged three awards: "Most Promising Male Artist", "Best Performance by a New Male Recording Artist" and "Most Promising Male Singer/Performer" from different respected award giving bodies.

In 1999, he was featured on singer Regine Velasquez's album R2K for the track "For the Love of You" alongside KC Montero. Together with Montero, they performed the song at Velasquez's R2K concert series which was held in Araneta Coliseum from April 7–8, 2000.

In 2001, Eigenmann was able to justify his talents upon the release of his debut album entitled Loving under VIVA Records. This album is mainly of the pop genre and its tracks are mostly in English.

In 2006, he surprised once again his fans with his second album entitled Sa Di Kalayuan under GMA Records which was named after one of the tracks from the album that eventually became ear's favorite. The other track entitled Muli was also a hit and became a soundtrack of the romantic comedy series I Luv NY and theme song of the koreanovela Yellow Handkerchief, both on GMA Network. The album itself conveyed Gabby's nearness to the listening public.

== Filmography ==
=== Film ===
Year	Title	Role
1997	Sa Kabilugan ng Buwan	Ricky
1998	Gangland	Dicky
2005	Bahay ni Lola 2	Michael
2005	Pinoy Blond	Various
2008	Half-Blood Samurai	John
2009	Kimmy Dora: Kambal sa Kiyeme	Kidnapper
2018	Sid & Aya: Not a Love Story	Darren Syquia
2023	Voltes V: Legacy – The Cinematic Experience	Oscar Robinson
2023	When I Met You In Tokyo	Marlon

=== Television ===
Year	Title	Role
1989–1998	Palibhasa Lalake	Gabriel
1995–1999	ASAP	Himself / Performer
1997–2010	SOP (Sobrang Okay Pare!)	Himself / Performer
1999	Di Ba't Ikaw	Alexander "Alex" Montecillo
2000	Tago Ka Na!	Wes
2000	Umulan Man o Umaraw	Nick
2001–2002	Ikaw Lang ang Mamahalin	Marc Fuentebella
2002	Sana ay Ikaw na Nga	James
2003–2004	Twin Hearts	Cedrick Sebastian
2004–2005	Forever in My Heart	Abet Torallba
2004	Love to Love: Pretty Boy	Ivan
2005–2006	Sugo	Crisanto
2006	Now and Forever: Duyan	Allan
2006	I Luv NY	Paul Young
2007	Muli	Alvin
2007	Mga Kuwento ni Lola Basyang: Ang Prinsipeng Duwag	Prinsipe Gandor
2007	Super Twins	Rex / Steelrex
2007–2008	Marimar	Nicandro Mejia
2008	E.S.P.	Ivan
2008	Sine Novela: Magdusa Ka	Roland Henson
2009	All About Eve	Max
2009	Darna	Apollo
2010–2013	Party Pilipinas	Himself / Performer
2010	Endless Love	Jojo Cruz
2010	Tween Hearts	Coach A / Bulldog / Sir Boris
2010	Jillian: Namamasko Po	Andre
2011–2012	Munting Heredera	Desmond Montereal / Michael Sison
2012	Broken Vow	Roberto Sebastian†
2012	Makapiling Kang Muli	Young Roman Valencia
2012–2013	Sana ay Ikaw na Nga	Gilbert Zalameda
2013	Magpakailanman: Kagat ng Asong Ulol	Eduardo Sese
2013	Mundo Mo'y Akin	Ziggy Carbonel
2013	Magpakailanman: The Art Evangelista Story	Art Evangelista
2014	Paraiso Ko'y Ikaw	Edward Rodrigo
2014	Dading	Ricardo "Carding / Dading" Gonzales
2014	Magpakailanman: Ang Ina sa Gitna ng Tsunami	Suichi
2015	Once Upon a Kiss	Father Philip "Father Madz" Madasalin
2015	Pari 'Koy	Barangay Captain Jude Banal
2015	InstaDad	Kenneth Monteamor
2015	Alamat: Ang Unang Bahaghari	Wigan
2015	Princess in the Palace	Renato
2015	Beautiful Strangers	Isagani Mendoza
2016	Magpakailanman: Mahal Kita, Mahal Ko Siya	Ramil
2016	Pepito Manaloto: Ang Tunay Na Kwento	Himself / Guest
2016	Dear Uge	Bartolome
2016	Magkaibang Mundo	Ruben Sandoval
2016	Magpakailanman: The Abused Boy	MJ
2016–2017	Sa Piling ni Nanay	Benedict Corpuz
2016–2017	Tsuperhero	Markano
2017	Imbestigador: Ganti	Reynante Suganob
2017	Imbestigador: Prof. D	Prof. Alfredo Dimaano
2017	My Love from the Star	Jackson Libredo
2017	Imbestigador: Bulacan Massacre	Dexter Carlos
2018	Contessa	Victorino "Vito" Imperial Jr. / Duquessa Dolce Vita-Imperial Jr.†
2019	Inagaw na Bituin	George Del Mundo
2019	Beautiful Justice	Ronnie Vida
2020–2021	Bilangin ang Bituin sa Langit	Arturo Zulueta
2021	The Lost Recipe	Waldorf
2021	I Can See You:#Future	Elvin Torres
2021–2022	Pepito Manaloto: Ang Unang Kwento	Tommy Diones
2022	Running Man Philippines	Himself / Guest
2022	Start-Up PH	Arnold Diaz
2023	Abot-Kamay na Pangarap	Chef Benedicto "Benny" Caballero
2023	Voltes V: Legacy	General Oscar Robinson
2023	All-Out Sundays	Himself / Guest Performer
2024	My Guardian Alien	Cepheus "Ceph" Corona
2025–2026	Encantadia Chronicles: Sang'gre	Zaur

== Discography ==
=== Albums ===
Year	Title	Label
2001	Loving	VIVA Records
2006	Sa Di Kalayuan	GMA Records

== Awards and nominations ==
Year	Award	Category	Nominated work	Result
2002	Aliw Awards	Most Promising Male Artist		Nominated
2011	ENPRESS Golden Screen Awards	Best Supporting Actor in a Drama Series	Munting Heredera	Won
2012	Asian TV Awards	Best Actor in a Supporting Role		Nominated
2014	PMPC Star Awards for TV 2014	Best Drama Actor	Dading	Nominated
2015	31st Star Awards for Movies	Movie Supporting Actor of the Year	Asintado	Nominated
2018	32nd PMPC Star Awards for TV	Best Drama Supporting Actor	Contessa	Won

- Best Supporting Actor-FAMAS
- Best Performance by a New Male Recording Artists – 15th Awit Awards 2002
- Most Promising Male Singer/Performer – 32nd Guillermo Mendoza Memorial Awards 2002
- Best New Artist (nomination)- MTV
