= Sid Lucero =

Filipino actor and model (born 1983)

- Born: Timothy Mark Pimentel Eigenmann; March 12, 1983 (age 43); Manila, Philippines
- Other names: Sid Lucero; Tim / Timmy
- Occupations: Actor; model
- Years active: 2003–present
- Agent: Star Magic
- Height: 1.75 m (5 ft 9 in)
- Children: 1
- Parents: Mark Gil (father); Bing Pimentel (mother)
- Relatives: Eigenmann family

Timothy Mark Pimentel Eigenmann (Tagalog: [ˈaɪɡɛnmɐn]; born March 12, 1983), known professionally as Sid Lucero (Tagalog: [luˈsɛro]), is a Filipino actor and model. Regarded for his intense dramatic performances in both independent films and mainstream television, his accolades include two Gawad Urian, a Cinema One Originals Award, a Thessaloniki International Film Festival Award, and a Los Angeles Comedy Festival Award, including nominations from Luna Award and Star Awards for Movies.

== Early life and background ==
Lucero was born Timothy Mark Pimentel Eigenmann on March 12, 1983, in Manila, Philippines. He belongs to the famous Eigenmann acting dynasty as the son of actors Mark Gil and Bing Pimentel. His stage name honors his father's iconic role in Batch '81.

== Career ==
Tim's stage name, Sid Lucero, is taken from the main character that his father, Mark Gil, portrayed in the movie Batch '81. His acting career began in 2004 with the GMA-7 soap opera, Hanggang Kailan. He soon landed the lead antagonist role in ABS-CBN fantaserye Krystala. At the 24th STAR Awards, he earned a nomination both for Best Actor (Selda) and Best Supporting Actor (Tambolista). His first acting award was given by Golden Screen in Donsol for Best Breakthrough Performance of an Actor.

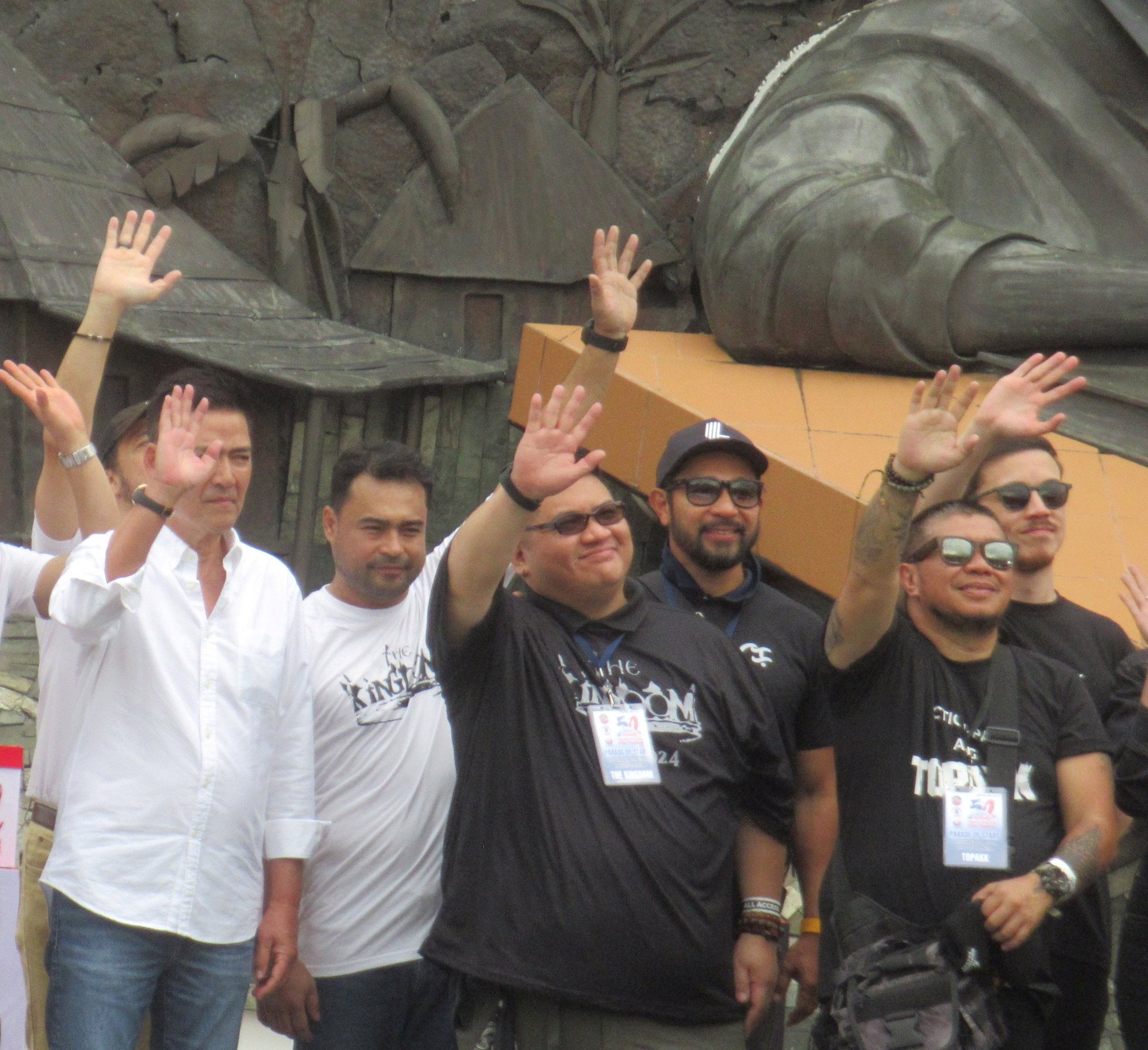
Lucero (The Kingdom) cast

Sid Lucero and Emilio Garcia tied for the Best Actor award at the July 14–22, 2000 Thessaloniki International Film Festival in Greece, for the film, Selda (The Inmate). He gained prominence as Alfred "Red" Ramirez in the Hit Primetime TV Series, Dahil May Isang Ikaw, which ran from 2009 to 2010. In 2011, the actor moved from ABS-CBN to GMA Network. He signed a 2-year contract with the network with his 1st project under the contract in the epic-drama series, Amaya. In 2012, Lucero became part of GMA Telebabad drama, Legacy.

== Personal life ==
He is the son of actors Mark Gil and Bing Pimentel, and is the older brother of Maxine Eigenmann and the younger half-brother of Gabby Eigenmann.

He is the older half-brother of Andi Eigenmann. Award-winning actress Cherie Gil is his aunt, and award-winning actor Michael de Mesa is his uncle while actors Ryan and Geoff Eigenmann are his cousins; Rosemarie Gil is his grandmother and Eddie Mesa is his grandfather.

He has a daughter named Halo Eve with Bea Lao, the drummer of the band, General Luna.

== Filmography ==
Key
†	Denotes films or TV productions that have not yet been released

=== Film ===
Year	Title	Role	Ref.
2006	Donsol	Daniel	
2006	Heremias	Sgt. Querubin	
2007	Batanes	Manuel	
2007	Selda	Rommel	
2007	Siquijor: The Mystic Island	Jake Bernal	
2007	Tambolista	Pablo	
2007	Tukso		
2008	Manay Po 2: Overload	Adrian/Adriana	
2009	Indepedencia	Son	
2009	Sabungero	Enzo	
2009	Squalor	Baste	
2010	Emir	Victor	
2010	Miss You Like Crazy	Stephan	
2010	Muli	Jun	
2010	Pitas	Rafael	
2010	Rosario	Carding	
2010	Shake, Rattle and Roll 12	Carlo	
2011	Anatomiya ng Korupsyon	Ric	
2011	Flight of an Angel	Gabby	
2012	Captive	Abu Mokhif	
2012	El Presidente	Gaudioso	
2013	Norte, the End of History	Fabian	
2013	Death March	Miguel	
2013	David F.		
2014	Mauban: Ang Resiko	Junior	
2014	Tyanak	Joben	
2015	Apocalypse Child	Ford	
2016	Hele sa Hiwagang Hapis	Basilio	
2016	Toto	Toto	
2017	Manila Death Squad		
2017	Madilim ang Gabi		
2017	Smaller and Smaller Circles	Father Jerome Lucero, SJ	
2017	Nervous Translation	Tino	
2019	Reminiscences of the Green Revolution	Jess	
2022	Reroute	Dan	
2022	Virgin Forest	Francis	
2022	Silip sa Apoy	Ben	
2022	Bugso	Diosadado "Dado" Santos	
2023	Nightbird	Vince	
2023	Topakk		
2023	Kahalili	Rod	
2024	Karma	Rommel	
2024	An Errand	Moroy	
2024	When the World Met Miss Probinsyana	Wil	
2024	Outside	Francis	
2024	The Kingdom	Magat Bagwis	
2024	Celestina: Burlesk Dancer		
2025	Posthouse	Cyril	

=== Television ===
Year	Title	Role	Ref.
2003–2004	Narito ang Puso Ko	Joaquin San Victores	
2004	Hanggang Kailan	Eugene	
2004–2005	Krystala	Igo / Sugo ng Dilim	
2005	Mars Ravelo's Darna	Jomar Vasquez	
2005	Etheria: Ang Ikalimang Kaharian ng Encantadia	young Asval	
2006	I Luv NY	Chris	
2007	Mga Kuwento ni Lola Basyang	Serpenton	
2007	Kokey	Isidro Alegre	
2008	Kung Fu Kids	Master Kung Lee	
2008	Ligaw na Bulaklak	Billy Sandoval	
2009	Komiks Presents: Flash Bomba	Gregorio "Gorio" San Martin	
2009	Your Song Presents: Gaano Kita Kamahal	Obet Bautista	
2009–2010	Dahil May Isang Ikaw	Alfred "Red" Ramirez / Pip	
2010	Magkano ang Iyong Dangal?	Nilo Morales	
2010	Your Song Presents: Andi	Brian / Obet	
2010–2011	Precious Hearts Romances Presents: Alyna	Dexter "Rex" Del Carmen	
2011–2012	Amaya	Bagani	
2012	Legacy	Iñigo Salcedo	
2012	Hindi Ka na Mag-iisa	Andrew Villagracia	
2013	Love & Lies	Gabriel "Gabby" Romero	
2013–2014	Magkano Ba ang Pag-ibig?	Luciano "Lucio" Aragon / Chino Aguirre	
2013	Katipunan	Andres Bonifacio	
2014	My Destiny	Jacob Perez	
2014	Ilustrado	Andres Bonifacio	
2015	Karelasyon: Baliw	Elmer	
2015	Magpakailanman: Misis Vs Beki	Turbo	
2016	The Millionaire's Wife	Jared Montecillo	
2016–2017	Alyas Robin Hood	Dean Balbuena	
2017	Karelasyon: Finale	Raymond	
2017–2018	FPJ's Ang Probinsyano	Maj. Manolo "Nolo" Catindig	
2018	Ipaglaban Mo: Uliran	Ramon	
2019	Ipaglaban Mo: Totoong Magulang	Ernie	
2020	Maalala Mo Kaya: Mural	Jerry	
2020	A Soldier's Heart	Saal Alhuraji / Abdul Waajid	
2021–2022	The World Between Us	Eric Carlos	
2022	The Fake Life	Mark Santiaguel	
2022	Wish Ko Lang: Selos	Anmar	
2023	Love Before Sunrise	Dr. Roald Vibal	
2024–2025	Lumuhod Ka Sa Lupa	Miguel Aguirre	
2024–2025	Walang Matigas na Pulis sa Matinik na Misis	Joseph "Jepoy" Roberto	
2025	Magpakailanman: Sa Gitna ng Unos: The Benhur Abalos Life Story	Benhur Abalos	
2025	Beauty Empire	Eddie Imperial	
2026	Wish ko Lang: Nagliliyab na Pag-ibig	Dennis / Mando	
2026	Pepito Manaloto: Tuloy Ang Kwento	Romeo Montenegro	
2026	Eat Bulaga!	Himself / guest with Shaina Magdayao	
2026	My Bespren Emman	Joshua "Josh" Mereilles	

=== Guesting in anthologies ===
- Maalaala Mo Kaya
  - (1 episode, 2008), as Jeepney Driver and live-in partner of Angelica Panganiban, who after having son with Angelica becomes a womanizer eventually separated getting his son after court decision.
  - 16th Anniversary (1 episode, 27 July 2007), as one of the children of Gina Pareño, on the story of a mother saddled with three psychologically disturbed children.

== Awards and nominations ==
Year	Organization / Critics	Category / Award	Work	Result	Ref.
2006	4th ENPRESS Golden Screen Awards	Breakthrough Performance by An Actor	Donsol	Won	
2007	Gawad Urian Awards of the Manunuri ng Pelikulang Pilipino	Best Actor	Donsol	Nominated	
2007	Cinema One Originals Awards	Best Actor	Tambolista	Won	
2007	5th ENPRESS Golden Screen Awards	Best Actor	Selda	Nominated	
2008	49th Thessaloniki International Film Festival	Best Actor (ex aequo)	Selda	Won	
2008	6th Gawad Tanglaw Awards	Best Actor in a Lead Role	Selda	Won	
2008	24th PMPC Star Awards for Movies	Best Supporting Actor	Tambolista	Nominated	
2008	24th PMPC Star Awards for Movies	Best Actor	Selda	Nominated	
2008	31st Gawad Urian Awards of the Manunuri ng Pelikulang Pilipino	Best Actor	Selda	Won	
2010	8th Golden Screen Awards	Best Actor in a Dramatic Motion Picture	Muli	Won	
2011	34th Gawad Urian of the Manunuri ng Pelikulang Pilipino	Best Actor	Muli	Won	
2011	ENPRESS Golden Screen TV Awards	Outstanding Performance by an Actor in a Drama Series	Amaya	Nominated	
2015	6th ENPRESS Golden Screen TV Awards	Outstanding Performance by an Actor in a Drama Program	Katipunan	Nominated	
2016	19th Los Angeles Comedy Festival	Best Actor	Toto	Won	
2016	34th Luna Awards of the Film Academy of the Philippines	Best Actor	Apocalypse Child	Nominated	
2016	39th Gawad Urian of the Manunuri ng Pelikulang Pilipino	Best Actor	Apocalypse Child	Nominated	
