= Kapantay Ay Langit (film) =

Kapantay ay Langit
- Official movie poster
- Directed by: Joel Lamangan
- Screenplay by: Emmanuel H. Borlaza; Joel Lamangan
- Story by: Emmanuel H. Borlaza
- Produced by: Vic R. Del Rosario Jr.; William C. Leary
- Starring: Sharon Cuneta; Richard Gomez
- Cinematography: Romy Vitug
- Edited by: Ike Jarlego Jr.
- Music by: Vicente del Rosario Jr.
- Production company: Viva Films
- Release date: February 9, 1994
- Country: Philippines
- Language: Filipino

Kapantay ay Langit is a 1994 Philippine romantic drama film directed by Joel Lamangan from a screenplay he co-wrote with Emmanuel H. Borlaza, who solely wrote the story.

== Plot ==
The story revolves around Odette (Sharon Cuneta), a single mother who closed her heart from love. Her daughter, Cristy (Charina Scott), played matchmaker to Steve (Richard Gomez), an advertising executive whom the young girl believes to be the right person for her mother.

== Cast ==
- Sharon Cuneta as Odette Yuson
- Richard Gomez as Steve Camua
- Bing Loyzaga as Leleng
- Liza Lorena as Mrs. Evelyn Camua
- Tonton Gutierrez as Frank
- Subas Herrero as Mr. Yuson
- Rosemarie Gil as Mrs. Yuson
- Charina Scott as Cristina

== Production ==
The film was produced by Viva Films, with the color processing by LVN Studios. Sampaguita Pictures was in-charge for the post-production facilities while Viva Films for the film facilities. It was released on 9 February 1994.
