= Hiram (TV series) =

Philippine television drama series

- Title card
- Genre: Drama; Romance
- Created by: Henry King Quitain
- Developed by: Malou N. Santos
- Directed by: Jerry Lopez Sineneng
- Starring: Kris Aquino; Dina Bonnevie; Heart Evangelista; Anne Curtis; Geoff Eigenmann
- Theme music composer: George Canseco
- Ending theme: "Hiram" by Zsa Zsa Padilla/Sharon Cuneta
- Country of origin: Philippines
- Original language: Tagalog
- No. of episodes: 223

Production
- Executive producer: Des D. Tanwangco
- Running time: 20-30 minutes
- Production company: Star Creatives

Original release
- Network: ABS-CBN
- Release: July 12, 2004 – May 20, 2005

Hiram (transl. borrowed, international title: Stolen Moments) is a Philippine television drama series broadcast by ABS-CBN. Directed by Jerry Lopez Sineneng, it stars Kris Aquino, Dina Bonnevie, Heart Evangelista, Anne Curtis, and Geoff Eigenmann. It aired on the network's Primetime Bida line up and worldwide on TFC from July 12, 2004 to May 20, 2005, replacing Sana'y Wala Nang Wakas and was replaced by Qpids.

== Premise ==
The story revolves around the relationships between Diana, Sophia, Beatrice, and Edward. Diana takes care of Beatrice's child Margaret after Beatrice dies. Sophia has a daughter Stephanie, from a past one night stand.

The story begins with a friendship between three females who find themselves sacrificing their lives for one another until respective generations find themselves also fighting for the love of one man.

== Cast and characters ==
=== Main cast ===
- Kris Aquino as Diana Benipayo-Verdadero, fondly called Hopia when she was growing up. Overweight, insecure and the youngest of the three friends, she grows up to be a beautiful television host. Diana stands as mother to Margaret, who is the love-child of her friend Beatrice (Mickey Ferriols). She fell in love with Louie (Christian Vasquez) but her true love is Edward. Character name is derived from British princess, Diana, Princess of Wales and Binibining Pilipinas-World 1992 Marina Benipayo.
- Dina Bonnevie as Sophia Borromeo, "ate" (sister) of Diana and the former Beatrice. Sophia takes the lead in making decisions, which does not make her very popular. She is envious, controlling and confident. She had Stephanie when she agreed to sleep with her Chinese employer to help Diana who got in trouble when they were working in Hong Kong. Sophia pretends to be strong and ruthless but she is also in love with Edward. She had a boyfriend, Alexander (Bernard Palanca), who loves her but knows she loves Edward more. Character is derived from Spanish queen consort, Queen Sophia of Spain and Binibining Pilipinas-Universe 1964 Myrna Panlilio-Borromeo.
- Heart Evangelista as Margaret Benipayo, beautiful, intelligent and sensible adopted daughter of Diana. She doesn't know the truth about her own birth. She fell in love with Harry, a simple son of a farmer whose face was disfigured. The relationship met the disapproval of Sophia, who took the opportunity to separate them when Harry suffered amnesia after a car crash. Margaret suffered when she found out that Harry was given the name Andrew and fell in love with her best friend Stephanie and Stephanie started to create her evil schemes against her. She decided to step out of the way rather than hurt her best friend. Character name is derived from English royals, Margaret Tudor and Princess Margaret, Countess of Snowdon .
- Anne Curtis as Stephanie Borromeo, arrogant, ruthless, villainess, pitiless and the main female antagonist of the series and the unwanted child of Sophia. All her life she lived in the shadow of Margaret until Andrew came into her life. She hurt badly when she found out that Andrew was actually Harry and will make Margaret's life a living hell as time goes by. Stephanie is self-destructive and emotionally dependent, but she is coming to her own. Character name is derived from Portuguese queen consort, Stephanie of Hohenzollern-Sigmaringen.
- Geoff Eigenmann as Harry Silayan/Andrew Florendo, the amnesiac victim who fell in love with two women who happened to be best friends. Harry is torn. Margaret won't take him back and won't give him a choice. Stephanie is pushing him away because of her insecurity. Everyone is anxious about whom he will choose. Character name is derived from British prince Prince Harry, Duke of Sussex/Prince Andrew, Duke of York and Binibining Pilipinas-Universe 1980 Chat Silayan/Miss Universe 1973 Margarita Moran-Florendo.
- John Estrada as Edward Verdadero, the crush ng bayan when Beatrice, Diana and Sophia were growing up. Handsome, rich and gentlemanly, Edward was the ideal man for all of them. But among the three, his heart only went out for Diana. He waited 20 long years before he could propose to Diana. Character name is derived from British king, Edward VIII and Binibining Pilipinas-Universe 1984 Desiree Verdadero.
- Mickey Ferriols as Beatrice, the deceased childhood friend of Sophia and Diana. Beatrice falls in love with Edward and has an affair with him. Before she dies she gives birth to a baby girl named Margaret.

=== Supporting cast ===
- Rosemarie Gil as Donya Carolina Verdadero
- Angel Aquino as Charlotte Crisostomo
- Christian Vasquez as Louie Diaz
- Ahron Villena as William
- Jaclyn Jose as Isabella
- Bernard Palanca as Alexander
- Andre Tiangco as Derek Sandico
- Tanya Gomez as Anna Silayan
- Gigette Reyes as Elizabeth
- Bong Regala as James Diaz
- Simon Ibarra as Paul
- Che Ramos as Emma
- Phytos Ramirez as Lou

=== Special participation ===
- Dick Israel as Diana's abusive uncle
- Pilar Pilapil as Sophia's abandoned mother
- Lito Legaspi as Don Felipe Verdadero

=== Guest cast ===
- Sarah Jane Carillo as young Margaret
- Katrina Michelle Legaspi as young Diana
- Rache Mae Manantan as young Sophia
- Angelina Marie Plummer as young Beatrice
- Jardson Librando as young Edward
- Julia Montes as Young Stephanie Borromeo
- Winchell Eric Ave as Mark, best friend of Andrew Florendo in Cordillera
