= I Luv NY =

2006 Philippine television drama series

- Title card
- Also known as: I Love New York
- Genre: Romantic drama
- Written by: Dode Cruz; Abi Lam-Parayno; Renato Custodio; Kit Villanueva-Langit; Denoy Punio-Navarro
- Directed by: Louie Ignacio
- Starring: Jolina Magdangal; Jennylyn Mercado; Mark Herras; Marvin Agustin
- Theme music composer: Kitchie Nadal
- Opening theme: "Makulay na Buhay" by Kitchie Nadal and Jolina Magdangal
- Country of origin: Philippines
- Original language: Tagalog
- No. of episodes: 85

Production
- Executive producer: Edlyn Tallada
- Production locations: New York City, United States; Metro Manila, Philippines
- Editors: Ed Esmedia; Ferdie Pangulahan
- Camera setup: Multiple-camera setup
- Running time: 21–36 minutes
- Production company: GMA Entertainment TV

Original release
- Network: GMA Network
- Release: May 15 – September 8, 2006

I Luv NY (international title: I Love New York) is a 2006 Philippine television drama romance series broadcast by GMA Network. The series is the first Philippine television drama series filmed in New York City. Directed by Louie Ignacio, it stars Jolina Magdangal, Jennylyn Mercado, Mark Herras and Marvin Agustin. It premiered on May 15, 2006 on the network's Telebabad line up. The series concluded on September 8, 2006, with a total of 85 episodes.

The series is streaming online on YouTube.

== Cast and characters ==
Cast

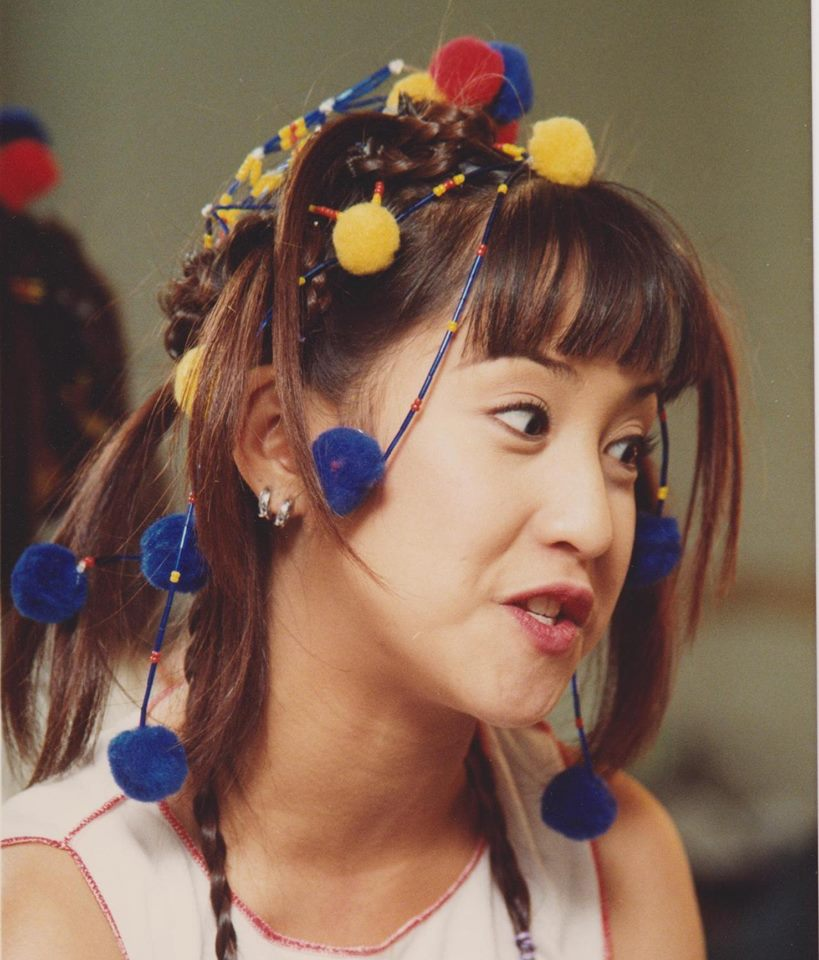
Jolina Magdangal

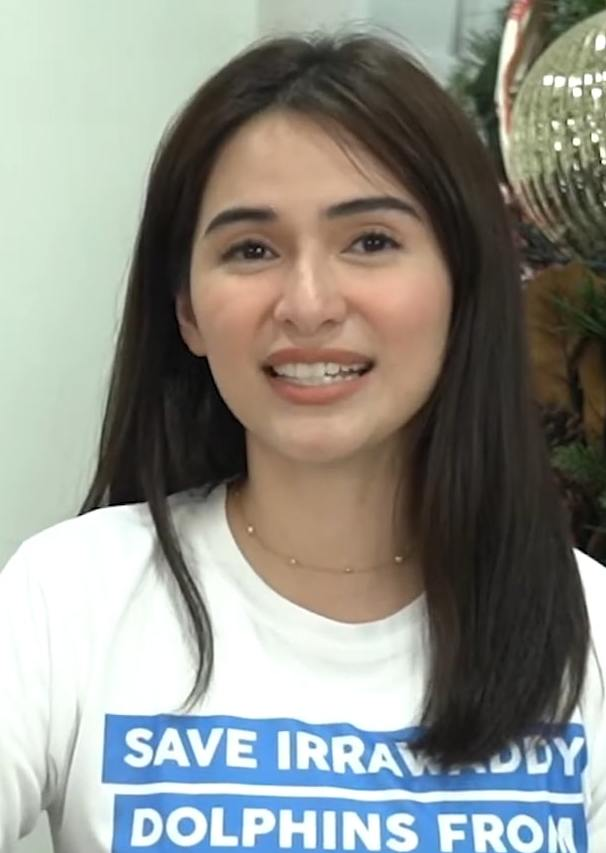
Jennylyn Mercado

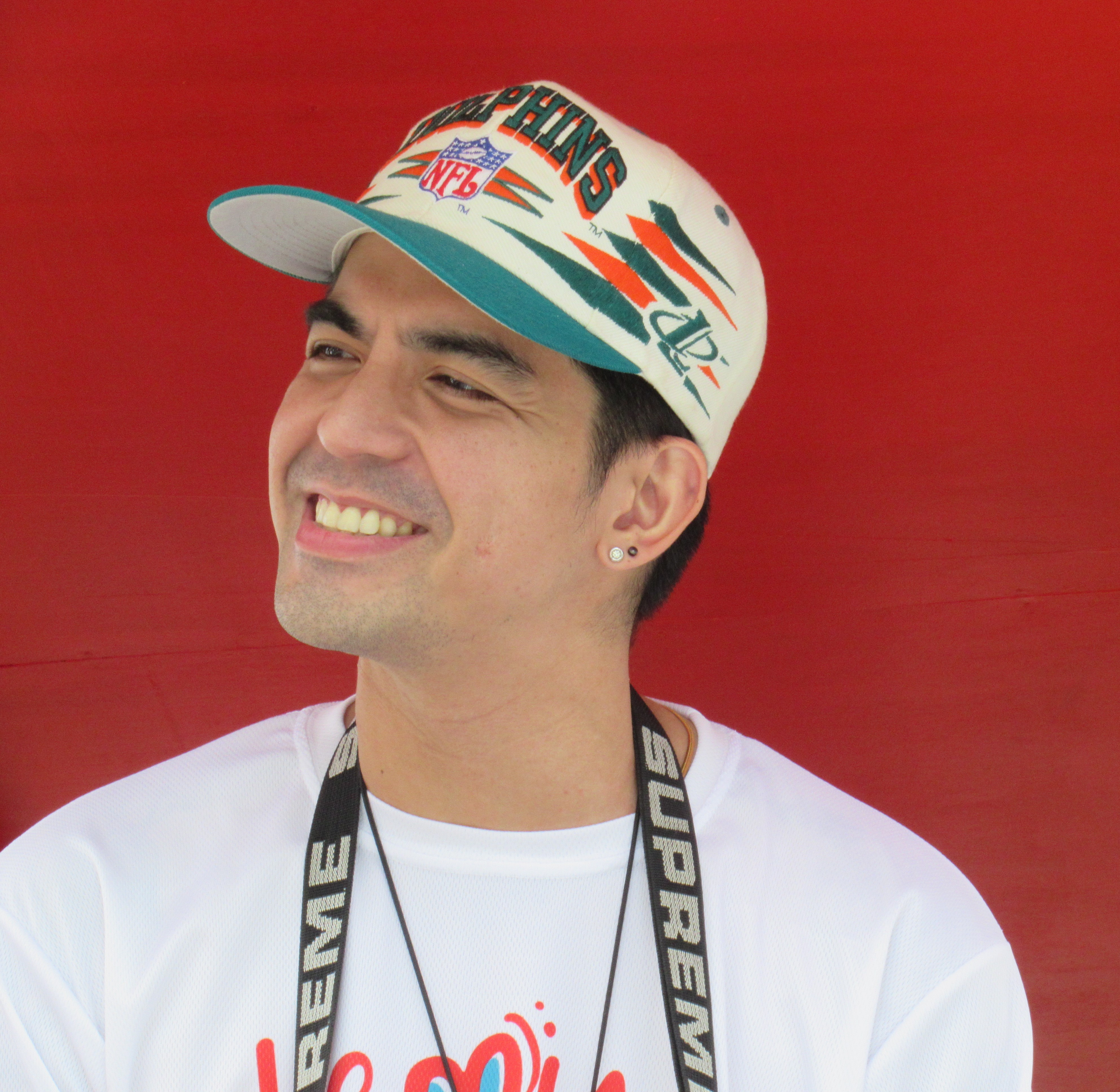
Mark Herras

Lead cast

- Jolina Magdangal as Apolinaria "Polly" Balumbalunan
- Marvin Agustin as Albert Sandoval
- Jennylyn Mercado as Natalie Young
- Mark Herras as Sebastian "Baste" Santos

Supporting cast

- Tirso Cruz III as Edward Young
- Carmi Martin as Diane Young
- Gabby Eigenmann as Paul Young
- Krizzy Jareño as Shayne Young
- Chinggoy Alonzo as Johnny
- Caridad Sanchez as Juliana
- William Martinez as Joaquin Santos
- Yayo Aguila as Susan Santos
- Isabel Oli as Wendy
- LJ Reyes as Ponyang
- Mike Tan as Jero
- Kirby de Jesus as Sunshine
- Alfred Vargas as Sebastian "Seb" Santos
- Tetchie Agbayani as Polly's mother
- Neil Ferreira as Billy

Recurring cast

- Tiya Pusit as Esther
- Gerald Santos as Gerry Balumbalunan
- Jonalyn Viray as Jenny de Castro

Guest cast

- Raymon Salvador as Harabas
- Tess Bomb as Ging
- Jocas de Leon as a hotel supervisor
- Craig Scribner as an immigration officer
- Joey de Leon as himself
- Allan K. as himself
- Sugar Mercado as herself
- Tanya Gomez as Lumeng
- Arnell Ignacio as Chichi Florence LaRoux
- Sid Lucero as Chris

== Ratings ==
According to AGB Nielsen Philippines, I Luv NY registered an average of 37.9% nationwide television ratings during its pilot week.
