= Grease Gun Brothers =

1985 action film by Tony Y. Reyes

- Directed by: Tony Y. Reyes
- Produced by: Naty A. Almanza
- Starring: Dante Varona; Bembol Roco; Rey Malonzo; Roy Flores
- Cinematography: Rey de Leon
- Edited by: Nap Montebon
- Music by: William Yusi
- Production company: Bathala Film Production
- Distributed by: Bathala Film Production
- Release date: December 12, 1985
- Country: Philippines
- Languages: Filipino; English

Grease Gun Brothers is a 1985 Philippine action film directed by Tony Y. Reyes. The film stars Dante Varona, Bembol Roco, Rey Malonzo and Roy Flores as the title roles.

Part of the footage from the movie is featured in the 1991 movie The Fighter, the Winner.

== Cast ==
- Dante Varona as Ramon Sanchez
- Bembol Roco as Romeo Sanchez
- Rey Malonzo as Rodrigo Sanchez
- Roy Flores as Renato Sanchez
- Michael de Mesa as Buddy Corsican
- Mark Gil as Danny Corsican
- Roi Vinzon as Sonny Corsican
- Melissa Mendez as Emily
- Kristel Romero as Gelene
- Faila Nazul as Rebecca
- Grego Gavino as Totoy Pilay
- Rene Jose as Atty. Jose
- Ernie Ortega as Antero
- Arnold Mendoza as Capt. Mallari
- Renato del Prado as Natong Burubot
- Rommel Valdez as Sendong Gilagid
- Danny Rojo as Domeng Solis
- Fred Moro as Inggong Pato
- Pong Pong as Tonyo
