= Kasalanan Bang Ibigin Ka? =

2012 Philippine television drama series

- Title card
- Also known as: Forbidden Love
- Genre: Romantic drama
- Developed by: Agnes Gagelonia-Uligan
- Written by: Maribel Ilag; Glaiza Ramirez; Michiko Yamamoto
- Directed by: Mark A. Reyes V
- Creative director: Jun Lana
- Starring: Geoff Eigenmann; Jackie Rice
- Theme music composer: Ariel Rivera; Vehnee Saturno
- Opening theme: "Sa Aking Puso" by Rachelle Ann Go
- Country of origin: Philippines
- Original language: Tagalog
- No. of episodes: 64

Production
- Executive producer: Mary Joy Lumboy-Pili
- Production locations: Manila, Philippines
- Cinematography: Jay Linao
- Camera setup: Multiple-camera setup
- Running time: 30–45 minutes
- Production company: GMA Entertainment TV

Original release
- Network: GMA Network
- Release: June 4 – August 31, 2012

Kasalanan Bang Ibigin Ka? (transl. is it a sin to love you? / international title: Forbidden Love) is a 2012 Philippine television drama romance series broadcast by GMA Network. Directed by Mark A. Reyes V, it stars Jackie Rice and Geoff Eigenmann. It premiered on June 4, 2012 on the network's Afternoon Prime line up. The series concluded on August 31, 2012, with a total of 64 episodes.

== Cast and characters ==
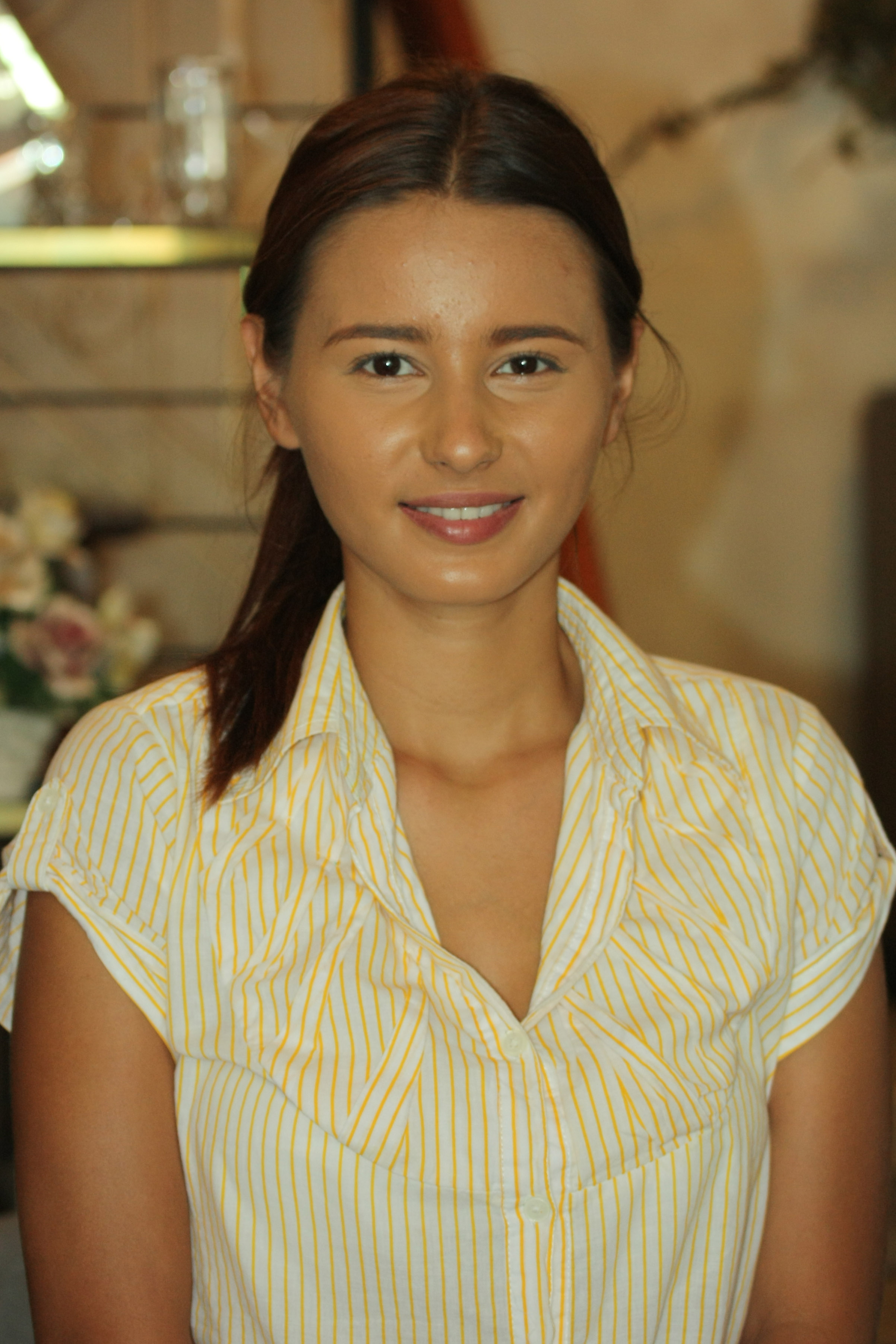
Jackie Rice portrays Erica Santiago.

Lead cast

- Jackie Rice as Erica Santiago-Montelibano
- Geoff Eigenmann as Jake / Joaquin Montelibano

Supporting cast

- Jennica Garcia as Bianca Santiago
- Michael de Mesa as Jaime Montelibano
- Angelika Dela Cruz as Leslie Montelibano
- Bubbles Paraiso as Janice
- Bobby Andrews as Neil
- Sharmaine Arnaiz as Beatrice Montelibano
- Pancho Magno as Tristan
- Diego Castro as Vitto
- Rox Montealegre as Karen
- Baby O'Brien as Malou
- Michael Flores as Sebastian

Guest cast

- Jackie Lou Blanco as Lalaine Santiago
- Ricardo Cepeda as Miguel Santiago
- Dang Cruz as Bing
- Vangie Labalan as Clara
- Nathalie Hart as Carissa

== Ratings ==
According to AGB Nielsen Philippines' Mega Manila household television ratings, the pilot episode of Kasalanan Bang Ibigin Ka earned a 16.6% rating. The final episode scored a 19.5% rating.

== Accolades ==
Accolades received by Kasalanan Bang Ibigin Ka?
Year	Award	Category	Recipient	Result	Ref.
2013	10th Golden Screen TV Awards	Outstanding Breakthrough Performance by an Actor	Pancho Magno	Nominated	
