= Anak ng Lupa =

Philippine action film

- Directed by: Manuel "Fyke" Cinco
- Screenplay by: Rene Villanueva
- Story by: Carlo J. Caparas
- Produced by: Tony Gloria
- Starring: Bong Revilla
- Cinematography: Ely Cruz
- Edited by: Augusto Salvador
- Music by: Vehnee Saturno
- Production company: Viva Films
- Distributed by: Viva Films
- Release date: March 11, 1987
- Running time: 100 minutes
- Country: Philippines
- Language: Filipino

Anak ng Lupa is a 1987 Philippine action film directed by Manuel "Fyke" Cinco. The film stars Bong Revilla as the title role.

== Cast ==
- Bong Revilla as Hector
- Pinky Amador as Noemi
- Lani Mercado as Miriam
- Michael de Mesa as Ariosto
- Dante Rivero as Nestong Antok
- Rosemarie Gil as Mrs. Torres
- Perla Bautista as Nana Tale
- Ruben Rustia as Lolo Martin
- Dick Israel as Eric
- Joonee Gamboa as Medes
- Julio Diaz as Jim

== Reception ==
Justino Dormiendo of the Manila Standard gave Anak ng Lupa a negative review. He criticizes the film for the lack of insight, as well as the uneven performances of the main and supporting characters attributed from Rene Villanueva's script. He cites the film's cinematography and editing as its only good points.
