= Eddie Mesa =

Filipino actor and singer (born 1940)

- Born: Eduardo de Mesa Eigenmann; February 18, 1940 (age 86); Manila, Philippine Commonwealth
- Occupations: Actor, singer
- Years active: 1959–present
- Spouse: Rosemarie Gil (m. 1958)
- Children: Michael; Mark; Cherie
- Family: Eigenmann family

Eduardo de Mesa Eigenmann (Tagalog pronunciation: [ˈaɪɡɛnmɐn]; born February 18, 1940), better known by his stage name Eddie Mesa (Tagalog pronunciation: [ˈmɛsa]), is a Filipino retired actor and singer. He was discovered by talent agents when he sang a Sammy Davis song. Afterwards he changed his surname to his mother's maiden name as Eddie Mesa, lead singer of Eddie Mesa And The Trippers. He was nicknamed Elvis Presley of the Philippines during his time as an impersonator of Elvis. He has acted in movies with the late Susan Roces and the late Fernando Poe Jr. Today he lives with his wife in the United States, where he has become a preacher. He is the father of Michael de Mesa, Mark Gil and Cherie Gil and grandfather of Andi Eigenmann.

== Film career ==
He acted with Eddie Romero's Hollywood film The Raiders of Leyte Gulf (1963). Kaputol ng Isang Awit (1991)

== Family ==
Eddie Mesa was born Eduardo de Mesa Eigenmann in Manila. His father was of Swiss-German ancestry. While on the job, he met his future wife Rosemarie Gil. Gil become pregnant with their first child Michael Edward (Michael de Mesa) who was born in 1960. The couple married in 1961 and had two more children: Raphael John (Mark Gil) and Evangeline Rose (Cherie Gil). They were separated in 1970. In 1978, Mesa left for Guam for six months and then moved to Hawaii when Martial Law was declared in 1972, while Rosemarie remained in the Philippines still active as an actress. Mesa reunited with his wife in 1986 after he became a Born-Again Christian.

Today, Eddie and Rosemarie have 13 grandchildren, most of whom have followed in their footsteps professionally: Ryan Eigenmann, Geoff Eigenmann, and AJ Eigenmann (Michael's sons), and Gabby Eigenmann, Sid Lucero, Andi Eigenmann, and Max Eigenmann (Mark's children from different women).

== Filmography ==
=== Films ===
- Kaputol ng Isang Awit-1991-Arsenio Rivera

== Discography ==
=== Studio Albums ===
Soul Man (1971)

The "Total" Performer (1973)

== Tractlists ==
'1.)"Aawitan Kita_(Tres Rosas"

== Awards ==
Year	Award giving body	Category	Nominated work	Results
1971	Awit Awards	Best Male Singer	—N/a	Won
