= Dante Varona =

Filipino actor

- Born: 1953 (age 72–73); Marikina, Philippines
- Occupations: Actor, stuntman, director
- Children: Tanya Varona

Dante Varona (born 1953) is a former Filipino actor, stuntman and film director. He is considered one of the more famous action stars of the 1970s and 1980s. One of his famous stunts involved jumping from the San Juanico Bridge in Hari ng Stunt (King of Stunts). This gave him the title of "King of Stunts".

== Early life ==
Varona grew up in Boystown in Marikina, where children were voluntarily surrendered. According to him, his parents couldn't take of him so they left him at the care of Boystown. There, he graduated elementary and high school. Once he graduated, he reunited with his parents.

== Career ==
In his time at Boystown, Varona developed an interest in gymnastics. He decided to apply that desire in becoming a stuntman. After joining the SOS Daredevils, a stuntmen's association, he started doubling for action stars such as Jess Lapid Sr. and Jun Aristorenas. He also signed a contract with Tower Productions.

Varona began his film career in 1968 with Magnificent Siete Bandidas. Leading roles in his early career included Master Stuntman (1970) and Leon Dimasupil (1973). He also made the film Gulapa (1977) with Ramon Revilla, based on the true-to-life-story of former Mayor Patrocinio Z. Gulapa of Maragondon, Cavite, and the film Carding Estrabel: Tirador ng Malabon, based on the life story of Ricardo Luciano. In the film Ang Sisiw ay ang Agila, he had a cameo role. He then got to act with Gloria Diaz in a leading role in Kung Tawagin Siya'y Bathala. In 1981, Varona jumped the San Juanico Bridge for a scene in "Hari ng Stunt" without a harness. The stunt became a selling point for the film, which used the tagline "The most death-defying action thriller of the year!" Both Varona and the film became very popular following their release, with him gaining the title "Hari ng Stunts".

He then directed some of his films, including Raging Anger (1984), and Bangkay Mo Akong Hahakbangin (1986), which he also starred in.

Varona and his wife then started their own production company, Bathala Films. Eventually, they quit the company and moved to the United States, where he became a janitor. The last two films he starred in before moving were Tiger Commando and Patron in 1988. In America, he got to join the Hollywood film Dune Warriors, starring David Carradine, Rick Hill, Blake Boyd, and Maria Isabel Lopez.

Varona returned to the Philippines in 1996. With the help of his stuntman friend Lito Lapid, who was also the governor of Pampanga at the time, he booked a role in Tapatan ng Tapang, which also starred Lapid. In 1999, he directed Ratratan. His final film would be Ako ang Lalagot sa Hininga Mo, which was shown in the 2000 Metro Manila Film Festival. After that, he returned to his life in the United States, this time taking a job as a security guard. There, he raised his family and now helps raise his grandchildren.

== Personal life ==
Varona has two children. His daughter is 2001 Metropop Songfest finalist and singer Tanya Varona.

Varona is now retired from the entertainment industry and currently resides in California.

== Filmography ==
Year	Title	Notes
2000	Ako ang Lalagot sa Hininga Mo	Final film
1999	Ratratan	Final directorial film
1998	Alamid: Ang Alamat	
1998	Isang Lahi, Isang Dugo... Sa Lupang Pangako	
1997	Alyas Baby Chino	
1997	Tapatan ng Tapang	Comeback film
1991	Dune Warriors	Hollywood film
1988	Patron	
1988	Tiger Commando	Also director
1988	Rebelyon	
1988	The Brown Ninja	
1987	Kamandag ng Kris	
1986	Bangkay Mo Akong Hahakbangin	Also director
1986	Bukas... Uulan ng Bala	
1985	Grease Gun Brothers	
1985	Ulo ng Gang-Ho	
1985	Siklab sa Lupa ng Araw	
1985	Anino ni David Crusado	
1984	Padre Hudas	
1984	Bitag	
1984	Ubusan ng Lahi	
1984	Moises ang Sugo	
1984	Raging Anger	Director
1983	Ganti	
1983	Heroes Hill	
1983	Pugante	
1983	Rebelde ng Mindanao	
1983	Lintik Lang ang Walang Ganti	
1983	Wanted: Turong Ahas	
1983	Commandos	
1982	Hinahamon Kita	
1982	Lakas Kapwa Lakas	
1982	Berdugo	
1982	Isinusumpa Ko	
1982	Sabayan	
1982	Mga Hayop sa Paraiso	
1981	Indio	
1981	Dos Bravos	
1981	Ben Gatilyo	
1981	Cleopatra Wong	
1981	Nagbabagang Lupa, Nagbabagang Araw	
1981	Agent 00	
1981	Asal Hayop	
1981	Kalabang Mortal	
1981	Commander Lawin	
1981	Landong Kabal	
1981	Bertong Barako	
1981	Ang Taong Bundok	
1981	Ermitanyo	
1981	Hari ng Stunt	Featured San Juanico Bridge stunt
1980	Carding Estrabel: Tirador ng Malabon	
1980	Estibador	
1980	Sagisag ng Batingaw	
1980	Kung Tawagin Siya'y Bathala	Lead role
1980	Kosa	
1979	Ang Sisiw ay Isang Agila	Cameo
1979	Objective 2400	
1979	Tonyong Bayawak	
1979	Pag-ibig at Kagitingan	
1979	Dakpin... Killers for Hire	
1979	Scout Ranger	
1978	Shanghai Joe	
1977	Gulapa	
1977	Mga Dragon sa Gubat	
1977	Phandora	
1977	Tao Ikaw Ba ang Gumaga sa Daigdig?	
1977	Alas Tres ng Hapon... Lumuhod ang Maton	
1977	Trinidad Is My Name	
1977	Walang Bakas na Naiiwan	
1976	Pagbabalik ng Apat na Alas	
1976	Ang Lihim ni Rosa Henson sa Buhay ni Kumander Lawin	
1976	Isang Pag-ibig, Isang Pangarap, at Isang Bulaklak	
1976	Silang Matatapang	
1975	Hell-0 400 Hour	
1975	Diwang Kayumanggi, Prinsesang Mandirigma	
1975	Nasa Lupa ang Langit at Impiyerno	
1975	Nagbabagang Silangan	
1975	Dugo at Pag-ibig sa Kapirasong Lupa	
1975	Anong Lahi Mayroon si Adan	
1975	Silakbo	
1974	Durugin ang mga Diyablo sa Punta Fuego	
1974	No Tears for the Brave	
1974	Angkan ni Watari	
1973	Dimas-Guerrero	
1973	Pugante: Numero 3-11	
1973	Leon Dimasupil	
1973	Alyas Blackie	
1972	Walang Impiyerno sa Matatapang	
1971	Sa Kamay ng Tatlong Takas	
1971	Almorciga	
1971	Digmaan ng mga Pasiklab	
1971	Ipaubaya sa Langit	
1971	Malupit na Tadhana	
1971	Luray	
1971	Ang Pangalan Ko'y Luray	
1970	Usapang Lalake	
1970	The Champion and the Saboteurs	
1970	Silang Tatlo	
1970	The Singer and the Bouncer	
1970	The Black Roses	
1970	Hiwaga ng Lagim	
1970	Ang Matitinik	
1970	Inside Job	
1970	The Bold and the Beauties	
1970	Master Stuntman	
1970	Queen of the Wild Bunch	
1970	Igorota Squad	
1970	Wild, Wild Pussycat	
1969	Men of Action Meet Women of Dracula	
1969	Ponso Villa and the Sexy Mexicanas	
1969	Zoom-Zoom Apollo	
1969	Kill: The Magnificent Agents	
1969	Kuwatro	
1969	Born to Be Wild	
1968	Chaku-Judo Aikido	
1968	Magnificent Siete Bandidas	Debut
