= Michael de Mesa =

Filipino actor (born 1960)

- Born: Michael Edward Gil Eigenmann; 24 May 1960 (age 66); Manila, Philippines
- Occupations: Actor; director
- Years active: 1978–present
- Spouses: Gina Alajar (m. 1978; ann. 2006) Julie Reyes (m. 2011)
- Children: 3, including Ryan and Geoff
- Parent(s): Eddie Mesa; Rosemarie Gil
- Relatives: Mark Gil (brother) Cherie Gil (sister)

Michael Edward Gil Eigenmann (Tagalog pronunciation: [ˈhil ˈaɪɡɛnmɐn]; born May 24, 1960), known professionally as Michael de Mesa (Tagalog pronunciation: [de ˈmɛsa]), is a Filipino actor and director.

== Early life ==
Born as Michael Edward Gil Eigenmann to performer Eddie Mesa and actress Rosemarie Gil, he and his siblings, Mark and Cherie, grew up steeped in the arts. He is the uncle of Gabby Eigenmann, Tim ″Sid Lucero″ Eigenmann, Max Eigenmann, and Andi Eigenmann. De Mesa is of Swiss, Spanish, and Filipino descent.

== Career ==
De Mesa began acting at age 16 in 1975 in Araw-araw, Gabi-gabi, and he remains active in film and television.

His most notable roles include the titular role of Gardo Valiente in the afternoon drama Valiente and as Damian Valiente in its remake, Ravenum in Mulawin, and as Jaime in Kasalanan Bang Ibigin Ka?, where he co-starred with his son Geoff Eigenmann.

From 2016 to 2022, he appeared as Pat. Ramil "Manager" D. Taduran in the ABS-CBN primetime series, Ang Probinsyano while serving as one of the series' directors.

== Personal life ==
De Mesa wed actress Gina Alajar in 1978. Their marriage lasted 23 years before they separated in 2001. Their marriage was annulled in 2006, but bore three children, all of whom are in show business: Ryan, Geoff, and AJ Eigenmann. He married Julie Reyes in September 2011. She is a dancer/choreographer from Hotlegs, Manila's premier jazz group. He was diagnosed with hepatitis C in 1999, but was cured of the disease in 2018.

== Filmography ==
=== Film ===
==== As actor ====
| Year | Title | Role |
|---|---|---|
| 1982 | Brother Ben | Ben |
| 1983 | Dugong Buhay | Rafael de Lara |
| 1985 | Grease Gun Brothers | Buddy Corsican |
| 1986 | Unfaithful Wife | Crispin |
| 1986 | Halimaw | Argonox |
| 1987 | Anak ng Lupa | Ariosto |
| 1988 | Tumayo Ka't... Lumaban | Jake |
| 1989 | Babayaran Mo ng Dugo | Nelson |
| 1990 | Barumbado | Cpl. Gonzales |
| 1991 | Leon ng Maynila: P/Col. Romeo B. Maganto, WPD-MPFF | Rico |
| 1991 | Takas sa Impierno | Julius |
| 1991 | Hihintayin Kita sa Langit | Milo Salvador |
| 1991 | Uubusin Ko ang Lahi Mo | Frank Canonico |
| 1991 | Una Kang Naging Akin | Ely |
| 1991 | Markang Bungo: The Bobby Ortega Story | |
| 1992 | Grease Gun Gang | Victor Lim |
| 1992 | Kahit Buhay Ko | Lt. Torres |
| 1992 | Jerry Marasigan, WPD | |
| 1992 | Mahirap Maging Pogi | Gabby |
| 1992 | Alyas Pogi 2 | Banjo |
| 1992 | Boy Recto | Alexander Aguila |
| 1993 | Lt. Madarang: Iginuhit sa Dugo | Rodel |
| 1994 | Tony Bagyo | Bogart |
| 1994 | Three Who Dared | |
| 1994 | Nagkataon, Nagkatagpo | |
| 1994 | The Maggie dela Riva Story: God... Why Me? | Rogelio Canal |
| 1995 | Batang-X | Dr. Kwago |
| 1995 | Bangers | Richard |
| 1995 | Muling Umawit ang Puso | Diosdado Rivera |
| 1996 | Neber 2-Geder | Ricky |
| 1996 | Abot-kamay ang Pangarap | Vic |
| 1997 | Hawak Ko Buhay Mo | Bakli Leeg |
| 1998 | Gangland | Director |
| 1998 | Nagbibinata | Teddy |
| 2004 | Avatar | Davinder Sandhu |
| 2005 | Dubai | Basi |
| 2005 | Mulawin: The Movie | Ravenum |
| 2006 | Nasaan si Francis? | Policeman |
| 2006 | First Day High | Coach Zantua |
| 2007 | Enteng Kabisote 4: Okay Ka Fairy Ko...The Beginning of the Legend | Prinsipe Inok |
| 2008 | Baler | Fr. Candido Gómez Carreno |
| 2009 | Litsonero | Pinoy |
| 2012 | D' Kilabots Pogi Brothers Weh?! | Mr. Lucio |
| 2013 | On the Job | Congressman Manrique |
| 2013 | 10,000 Hours | Dante Cristobal |
| 2016 | Everything About Her | Leo |
| 2016 | This Time | Gino |
| 2016 | The Woman Who Left | Rodrigo Trinidad |
| 2016 | Bakit Lahat ng Gwapo may Boyfriend? | Nap/Lexi |
| 2017 | Bliss | Talk show host |
| 2017 | Carlo J. Caparas' Ang Panday | Eduardo Montemayor |
| 2019 | Marineros: Men in the Middle of the Sea | |
| 2020 | Nightshift | Dr. Alex |
| 2020 | Isa Pang Bahaghari | Reynado "Rhey/Reynalda" Torrecampo |
| 2022 | Labyu with an Accent | Walter |
| 2024 | Green Bones | Superintendent Juanito Velasquez |
| 2025 | Kontrabida Academy | Arnulfo |

==== As director ====
| Year | Title | Notes |
|---|---|---|
| 1997 | Calvento Files: The Movie | Segment "Inay, May Momo!" |

=== Television ===
| Year | Title | Role |
|---|---|---|
| 1987 | Squad 13 | |
| 1991 | Cebu | |
| 1992 | Valiente | Gardo Valiente |
| 1994 | Bisperas ng Kasaysayan | Dr. Juanito Morga |
| 1999 | Rio Del Mar | Anton |
| 2001 | Biglang Sibol, Bayang Impasibol | Tonito |
| 2001 | Ikaw Lang ang Mamahalin | Elmo |
| 2002 | Bituin | Salvador "Ador / Badong" Sandoval |
| 2004–2005 | Mulawin | Ravenum |
| 2007 | Sana Maulit Muli | Mang Andres / Mr.Destiny |
| 2007 | Lupin | Minggoy Buang / Miguel Apacer |
| 2009 | The Wedding | Frank De Menes |
| 2012 | Valiente | Damian Valiente |
| 2012 | Kasalanan Bang Ibigin Ka? | Jaime Montelibano |
| 2013 | Indio | Juancho Sanreal |
| 2013 | Kahit Nasaan Ka Man | Ernest Gomez |
| 2014 | Innamorata | Lloyd Manansala |
| 2015 | Once Upon a Kiss | Enrique "King" Pelaez |
| 2015–2016 | Destiny Rose | Rosauro Armani Vitto |
| 2016 | Eat Bulaga! Lenten Special: God Gave Me You | Theo |
| 2016 | Sinungaling Mong Puso | Moises Aguirre |
| 2016–2022 | FPJ's Ang Probinsyano | Pat. Ramil "Manager" D. Taduran |
| 2017–2018 | Ikaw Lang ang Iibigin | Roman Dela Vega |
| 2018 | Since I Found You | Gary Corpuz |
| 2023 | Almost Paradise | Warden Zamora |
| 2024 | Walang Matigas na Pulis sa Matinik na Misis | Luther Abueva |
| 2024 | Magpakailanman: Taylor Made Success: The John Mac Lane Coronel Story | Rolly |
| 2024–2025 | Forever Young | Eduardo Malaque Sr. |
| 2025 | FPJ's Batang Quiapo | Rafael "Paeng" Benito |
| 2025 | It's Okay to Not Be Okay | Samuel Hernandez |
| 2025-2026 | My Bespren Emman | Mayor Gaspar Mereilles |
| 2026 | Love Is Never Gone | Divino Verona |

=== As director ===
| Year | Title | Notes |
|---|---|---|
| 1994–1996 | Maalaala Mo Kaya | |
| 1997 | Calvento Files: The Movie | (segment "Inay, May Momo!") |
| 2000 | Ika-13 Kapitulo | |
| 2013–2016 | Magpakailanman | |
| 2016–2022 | FPJ's Ang Probinsyano | |

== Awards and nominations ==
| Year | Work | Award | Category | Result | Source |
|---|---|---|---|---|---|
| 1987 | Unfaithful Wife | 11th Gawad Urian | Best Actor | Won | |
| 2013 | 10,000 Hours | 39th Metro Manila Film Festival | Best Supporting Actor | Nominated | |
| 2020 | Isa Pang Bahaghari | 46th Metro Manila Film Festival | Best Supporting Actor | Won | |

== See also ==
- Andi Eigenmann
- Gabby Eigenmann
- Geoff Eigenmann
- Mark Gil
- Ryan Eigenmann
- Sid Lucero
