= May Bukas Pa (2000 TV series) =

- Genre: Drama
- Created by: Viva Television
- Directed by: Gil Tejada Jr.
- Starring: Dina Bonnevie; Cherie Gil; Albert Martinez
- Theme music composer: Rico J. Puno
- Opening theme: "May Bukas Pa" (instrumental)
- Ending theme: "May Bukas Pa" by Wency Cornejo "Save this Heart" by Lani Misalucha "Kung Wala Na" by Jaya "Bakit Iniwan" by Freestyle
- Country of origin: Philippines
- Original language: Tagalog
- No. of episodes: 224

Production
- Executive producer: Vic del Rosario
- Running time: 30 minutes

Original release
- Network: IBC (2000); RPN (2000–2001)
- Release: April 24, 2000 – May 4, 2001

May Bukas Pa (lit. There Is Still Tomorrow) is a Philippine television drama broadcast by IBC and RPN. Directed by Gil Tejada Jr, it stars Dina Bonnevie, Albert Martinez and Cherie Gil. It aired from April 24, 2000 to May 4, 2001. The show was aired on a 6:00pm timeslot during Mondays, Tuesdays, and Thursdays on IBC, and then on weekdays at 6:30-7:00pm when it moved on RPN.

== Plot ==
Sofia's husband Rico, was a drunk and a bum and didn't work to support the family. This is why Sofia had to work in place of her husband just to make ends meet. In spite of this, Sofia's husband was able to accuse her of adultery and took off with their only daughter, Milagros. Sofia then, went after her husband but before being able to confront him, the husband was run over by a bus.

Not to be dismayed, Sofia went off to Manila in search for her lost child. Little did she know that her daughter was adopted by a famous actress named Divina Miguel whose motives for the child was a political move to increase hype for her new movie.

Sofia, having been gifted with an angelic voice, was discovered by a talent manager and eventually became a famous singer-actress. The point came where Sofia's popularity overshadowed Divina's and to make things worst, Ramon, Divina's love team, tied the knot with Sofia and left Divina. This made Divina Miguel furious and from then on considered Sofia as her mortal enemy. Dreading Sofia for taking away everything from her, Divina directed her anger towards her poor adopted child Bea (Milagros).

At times, Divina would think about her child that she gave away for her career. Divina was disowned by her aunt Donya Felisa when she became pregnant. What Divina doesn't know is that the child she gave away fell under the care of Delia (the maid of Donya Felisa). This child is Charie. Divina was maltreating Charie as she's just a maid's daughter, not knowing that it was her own child.

However, when Donya Felisa died, Divina would plot to acquire her aunt's wealth against Irene who is her aunt's adopted child and happens to be Sofia's long lost sister.

== Cast ==
=== Main cast ===
- Dina Bonnevie as Sofia Catacutan
- Albert Martinez as Ramon Suarez
- Cherie Gil as Divina Miguel
- Celia Rodriguez as Conchita Suarez
- Angelu de Leon as Irene Buencamino
- Kim delos Santos as Charie Miguel
- Anne Curtis as Bea Miguel
- Michael Flores as Dennis Suarez
- Bojo Molina as Marcus Paredes
- Dino Guevarra as Ricky
- Chubi del Rosario as Leslie

=== Supporting cast ===
- Rosemarie Gil as Rodora Suarez
- Aiza Marquez as Trina Suarez
- Maui Taylor as Ruthy
- Maureen Mauricio as Delia
- Patricia Javier as Vivian Paredes
- Ricardo Cepeda as Fidel
- Vanna Garcia as Sharon
- Jackie Castillejo as Carla
- My-My Davao as Patty
- Katya Santos as Tricia
- Phillip Lazaro as Freddie
- Leni Santos as Helen
- Daniel Fernando as Rico Catacutan

=== Extended cast ===
- Wendy Fernando as Mylene
- Jacklyn Kate as Wendy
- Polo Ravales as Michael
- Ivan Gonzales as Andrei
- Daria Ramirez as Belinda
- Pocholo Montes as Delfin
- Mike Lloren as Leo

=== Minor Cast/Special Participation ===
- Marita Zobel as Doña Felisa
- Ryan Eigenmann as Dave
- Benjie Felipe as Kidnapper
- Harlene Bautista as Annie

== Staff ==
Directed by: Gil Tejada Jr.

Headwriter: RJ Nuevas

Writers: Suzette Doctolero, Patricia Valenzuela

== Songs ==
- May Bukas Pa by Wency Cornejo (main theme) - Originally performed by Rico J. Puno
- Save This Heart by Lani Misalucha (closing theme)
- Kung Wala Na by Jaya (closing theme)
- Bakit Iniwan by Freestyle (closing theme)
- Breathless by The Corrs - used by Girls can Sing (Anne Curtis, Aiza Marquez, Vanna Garcia, Maui Taylor) in the contest they joined
