= Mark Gil =

Filipino actor (1961–2014)

- Born: Raphael John Gil Eigenmann; September 25, 1961; Manila, Philippines
- Died: September 1, 2014 (aged 52); Manila, Philippines
- Other name: Ralph
- Occupation: Actor
- Years active: 1978–2014
- Spouses: Bing Pimentel (m. 1983; sep. 1988) Maricar Jacinto (m. 1996)
- Partner(s): Irene Celebre (1976–1981); Jaclyn Jose (1988–1991)
- Children: 6, including Gabby, Sid, Max and Andi
- Parents: Eddie Mesa; Rosemarie Gil
- Relatives: Eigenmann family

Raphael John Gil Eigenmann (September 25, 1961 – September 1, 2014), known professionally as Mark Gil, was a Filipino actor. Gil was often cast as a main villain in Philippine action films that was popular during the late '80s to the early 2000s.

Gil was also widely known for playing the protagonist of the critically acclaimed 1982 film Batch '81 and the role of Lorna Tolentino's former Filipino-American boss-lover-killer in the drama-suspense thriller The Elsa Santos Castillo Story: The Chop-Chop Lady, the script of which is inspired by true events. He also appeared in several drama series, the last of which was the ABS-CBN drama The Legal Wife, starring Angel Locsin and Jericho Rosales.

== Personal life ==
He was the middle child of actors Eddie Mesa and Rosemarie Gil, and brother of actors Michael de Mesa and Cherie Gil.

He is the father of singer/actor Gabby Eigenmann and Katherine "Ira" Eigenmann by model/actress and then-childhood girlfriend Irene Celebre. He was sixteen years old when he had his first born Gabby. Timothy (a.k.a. Sid Lucero) and Maxine Eve are his children by his first wife, actress Bing Pimentel. Andi Eigenmann is his daughter with actress Jaclyn Jose. Gil married his second wife, non-showbiz Maricar Jacinto, in 1996; the couple had one child, Stephanie ("Stevie").

== Death ==
Gil died on September 1, 2014, aged 52, of cirrhosis of the liver, stemming from cancer of the liver, 24 days before his 53rd birthday. He was survived by his wife Maricar, six children and seven grandchildren.

== Filmography ==
=== Film ===
Year	Title	Role	Notes
1978	Kung Kaya Mo, Kaya Ko Rin		
1980	Underage		
1980	Miss X		
1981	Pabling		
1981	Bihagin: Bilibid Boys	Noel	
1981	Bilibid Gays		
1981	Kasalanan Ba?		
1981	Rock n Roll		
1981	Matalim Na Pangil sa Gubat		
1982	Karibal Ko ang Aking Ina		
1982	Dormitoryo! Buhay Estudyante		
1982	Palipat-Lipat, Papalit-Palit		
1982	Batch '81	Sid Lucero	
1983	Parang Kailan Lang		
1983	Laruan	William	
1983	Palabra de Honor		
1984	Naiibang Hayop		
1984	Sa Bulaklak ng Apoy		
1984	May Daga sa Labas ng Lungga		
1984	Alapaap		
1985	Company of Women	Al	
1985	Apoy sa Iyong Kandungan	Alex	
1985	Alyas: Boy Life		
1985	Mga Alipin ng Laman		
1985	Ina, Kasusuklaman Ba Kita?		
1985	Zuma	Philip	
1985	Lihim sa Likod ng Buwan		
1985	Kalapating Musmos		
1985	Grease Gun Brothers		
1985	Bakit Manipis ang Ulap?		
1986	Sugat sa Dangal		
1986	Macho Gigolo		
1986	Lumuhod Ka sa Lupa!		
1986	Agaw Armas		
1987	Kid, Huwag Kang Susuko!		
1987	Daughter of Anik: Hell Serpent	Philip	
1987	Pasan Ko ang Daigdig	Greco	
1988	Sa Likod ng Kasalanan		
1988	Anak ng Cabron		
1988	Afuang: Bounty Hunter	Benjie	
1988	Urban Terrorist	Ka Rodger	
1988	Trident Force	Ahmed	
1988	Itanong Mo sa Buwan	Angelito "Anghel" Asuncion	
1989	Ang Lahat ng Ito Pati Na ang Langit		
1989	Bakit Iisa Lamang ang Puso		
1989	Ipaglalaban Ko		
1989	Hindi Pahuhuli ng Buhay	Cesar	
1990	Kolehiyala	Serge	
1990	Paikot-Ikot		
1990	Bad Boy		
1991	Ang Utol Kong Hoodlum	Salazar	
1991	Sa Kabila ng Lahat		
1992	Ngayon at Kailanman	Ronald Noche	
1992	Totoy Buang: Mad Killer ng Maynila		
1992	Valentin Zapanta: Alyas Ninong	Tisoy	Main Antagonist
1992	Dalawa Man ang Buhay Mo, Pagsasabayin Ko	Alex	
1992	Sa Akin Ang Asawa Mo	Arman	Lead Role
1992	Emong Verdadero: Tatak ng Cebu II (Bala ng Ganti)	Sarhento Mendoza	
1992	Boboy Salonga: Batang Tondo	Lt. Ventura	
1992	Tag-Araw, Tag-Ulan	Richie	
1992	Narito ang Puso Ko	Renato Sanchez	
1993	Pugoy – Hostage: Davao	Mohammad Nazir Samparani	
1993	Kahit Ako'y Busabos		
1993	Sala sa Init, Sala sa Lamig	Mike Escobar	
1993	Astig		
1993	Tikboy Tikas at Mga Khroaks Boys		
1993	Gascon: Bala ang Katapat Mo!	Anslemo Guevarra	
1994	The Elsa Santos Castillo Story: The Chop Chop Lady	Sid Wiseman	
1994	Bratpack (Mga Pambayad Atraso)		
1995	Eskapo	Jesús "Jess" Cabarrus Jr.	
1995	Manalo, Matalo, Mahal Kita	Felix	
1996	Tubusin Mo ng Bala ang Puso Ko	Frank	
1996	Cedie	James Errol	
1996	Kung Kaya Mo, Kaya Ko Rin!	Dennis	
1996	Enteng and the Shaolin Kid		
1996	Diego		
1996	Itataya Ko ang Buhay Ko	Capt. Lucban	
1996	Madaling Mamatay, Mahirap Mabuhay		
1996	Sa Bingit ng Kamatayan		
1996	Ben Balasador: Akin ang Huling Alas	Nelson Martinez	
1997	Bastardo		
1997	Amanos: Patas Na ang Laban		
1997	Tawagin Mo Na ang Lahat ng Santo	Alfredo Samson	
1997	Babae	Ricky	
1997	Magic Kingdom	Basilicus	
1998	Tong Tatlong Tatay Kong Pakitong Kitong		
1998	Dama de Noche		
1998	Gangland		
1999	Hinahanap-Hanap Kita	Greg	
1999	Saranggola		
1999	Dugo ng Birhen: El Kapitan	El Kapitan	
2000	Pera o Bayong (Not da TV)	Burador	
2000	Kahit Isang Saglit		
2000	Laro sa Baga	Butch	
2001	Sa Huling Paghihintay		
2002	Mama San	Congressman Zulueta	
2003	Kerida		
2003	Magnifico	Domeng	
2003	Sa Piling ng Mga Belyas		
2004	Lastikman: Unang Banat	Andrew	
2004	Spirit of the Glass		
2005	Uno		
2005	Exodus: Tales from the Enchanted Kingdom	Moreto	
2006	Nasaan si Francis?		
2006	Rotonda		
2006	Donsol	Dustin	
2006	Raket si Nanay		
2007	Liwanag sa Dilim		
2007	A Love Story	Peter	
2008	Baby Angelo	Noel	
2008	U.P.C.A.T.	Mr. Concepcion	
2008	Alon	Fiel	
2009	Isang Lahi: Pearls from the Orient	Professor Balaoing	
2009	Sumpa	Dennis	
2009	Puntod		
2010	Till My Heartaches End	Paquito Barredo	
2012	Corazon: Ang Unang Aswang	Matias	
2012	The Healing	Val	
2012	The Strangers		
2013	Seduction	Fidel	
2013	The Fighting Chefs	Don Manolo	
2013	Raketeros	?????	
2013	Philippino Story	?????	
2014	Mana	Lino	
2014	Ang Bagong Dugo	Herman/Supremo	
2016	Ang Tatay Kong Sexy	?????	Last film appearance

=== Television ===
Year	Title	Role	Notes
1988	Regal Drama Hour: "Infidel"	Levy	
1991–1992	Cebu	Michael "Mike" dela Rosa	
1994	Bisperas ng Kasaysayan	Teniente Carlos Luzuriaga	
1997	Mula sa Puso	Bagyo	
1997	Star Drama Theater Presents: Angelika		Episode: "Sugat"
1999	Saan Ka Man Naroroon	Edward	
2001	Sa Puso Ko Iingatan Ka	Abby's father	
2001	Ikaw Lang ang Mamahalin	Miguel	
2002	Ang Iibigin ay Ikaw	Enrico Villadolid	
2003	Ang Iibigin ay Ikaw Pa Rin	Enrico Villadolid	
2004	Hanggang Kailan	Roberto	
2006	Atlantika	Felipe	
2007	Sine Novela: "Sinasamba Kita"	Don José Ferrer	
2007	Mga Kuwento ni Lola Basyang: Ang Plautin ni Periking	Special Guest	
2008	Sine Novela: Gaano Kadalas ang Minsan	Emilio Cervantes	
2008	Kung Fu Kids	Master Wu Lee	
2008	Maalaala Mo Kaya: Larawan	Yeng	
2008	Eva Fonda	Don Ismael Mendez	
2008	Kapamilya, Deal or No Deal	Himself as a guest	
2009	Zorro	Horacio Pelaez	
2009	Lovers in Paris	John Palma	
2010	Kung Tayo'y Magkakalayo	Tony Angeles	
2010	Magkaribal	Manuel Abella	
2010	Precious Hearts Romances Presents: Alyna	Don Felipe Del Carmen	
2010	Your Song Presents: Andi	Rico	
2010	Imortal	Julio	
2011	Maalaala Mo Kaya: Medalyon	Fidel	
2011	100 Days to Heaven	Norman Manalastas	
2011	Guns and Roses	Lucio Dela Rocha	
2011	Ikaw ay Pag-Ibig	Leandro Alvarez	
2012	Valiente	Don Armando Braganza	
2012	Maalaala Mo Kaya: Belo	Randell	
2012	Makapiling Kang Muli	Roman Valencia	
2012	Walang Hanggan	Mr. Cruz	
2012	Pahiram ng Sandali	Larry Gomez	
2013	Indio	Miguel Lopez de Legaspi	
2013	Maalaala Mo Kaya: Diploma	Alfonso Ponce Enrile	
2013	My Husband's Lover	Galo Agatep	
2013	Maalaala Mo Kaya: Mask	Edgar	
2014	Pepito Manaloto: Ang Tunay na Kuwento	Amadeo Nicolas	
2014	The Legal Wife	Dante Ramos	Last TV Appearance
