= Cherie Gil =

Filipino actress (1963–2022)

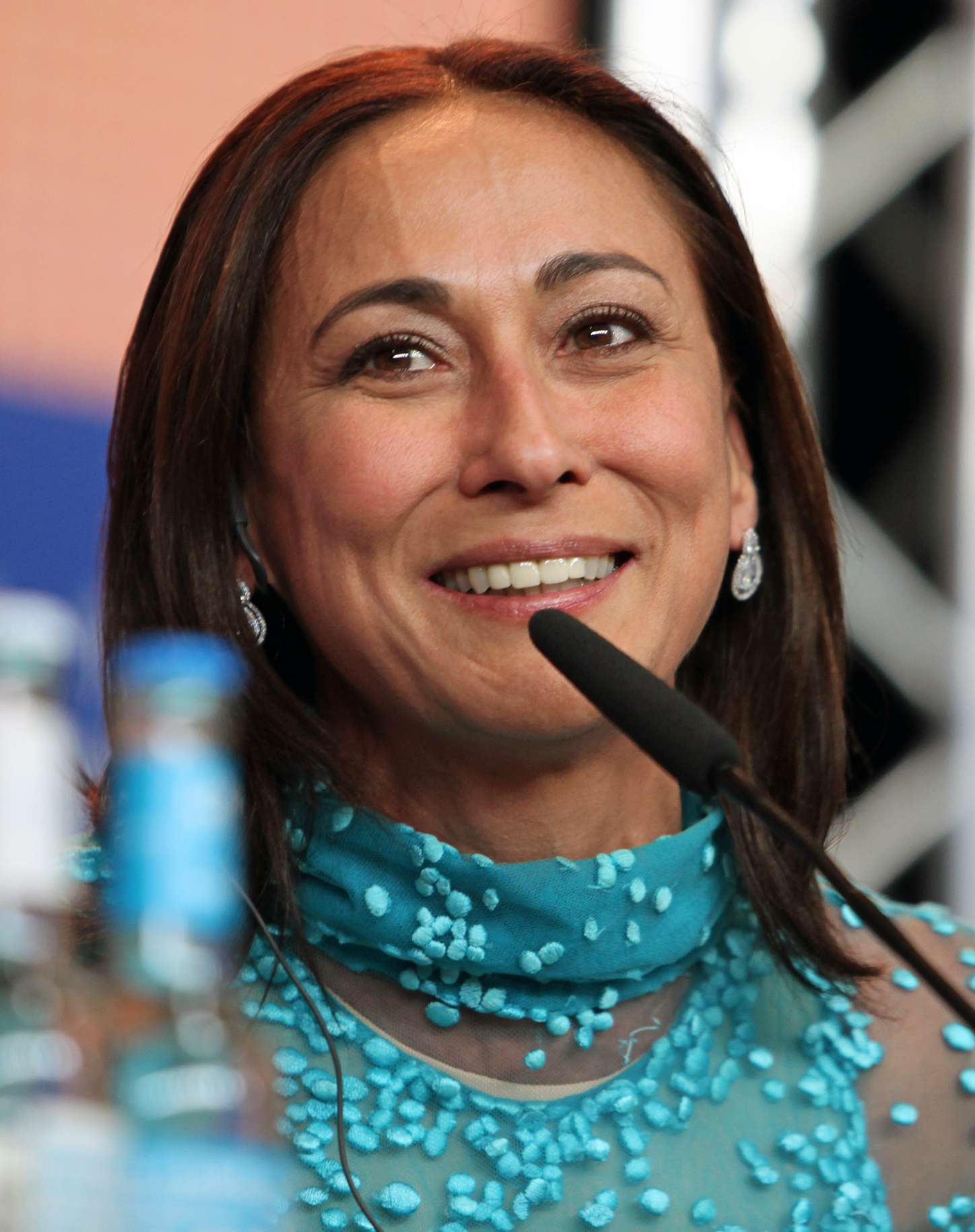
- Gil at the Berlinale 2016
- Born: Evangeline Rose Gil Eigenmann; June 21, 1963; Manila, Philippines
- Died: August 5, 2022 (aged 59); New York City, United States
- Occupations: Actress; singer; comedian; writer; model; television host
- Years active: 1970–2022
- Agent(s): ABS-CBN; GMA Network
- Height: 5 ft 7 in (1.70 m)
- Spouse: Rony Rogoff (m. 1994; ann. 2008)
- Children: 3
- Parents: Eddie Mesa (father); Rosemarie Gil (mother)
- Family: Eigenmann family

Evangeline Rose Gil Eigenmann (Tagalog pronunciation: [ˈhil ˈaɪɡɛnmɐn]; June 21, 1963 – August 5, 2022), known professionally as Cherie Gil (Tagalog: [ˈtʃeɾi ˈhil]), was a Filipino actress and singer. With a career spanning nearly 50 years, she was dubbed the "La Primera Contravida" ("The Prime Villain") for her acting prowess which landed her numerous antagonistic roles on film, television, and the stage.

Gil was a FAMAS Award winner, a recipient of Ani ng Dangal by the National Commission for Culture and the Arts and a Hall of Famer at the Metro Manila Film Festival in the Best Supporting Actress category. In 2015, she won the Best Actress trophy at the ASEAN International Film Awards. The same year, she also won the Best Lead Actress in a Foreign Language Film at the 2015 Madrid International Film Festival. In 2019, she was awarded the Best Supporting Actress at the 42nd Gawad Urian Awards for her portrayal of the character Patricia Medina in the feature film Citizen Jake.

She began her career as a child actress at the age of 9, and was best known for her role as Lavinia Arguelles in Bituing Walang Ningning (1985) where she uttered the iconic line "You're nothing but a second-rate, trying hard copycat!" to Dorina Pineda, Sharon Cuneta's character.

== Early life ==
Cherie Gil was born on June 21, 1963 as Evangeline Rose Gil Eigenmann to a family of actors. Her parents were Eddie Mesa and Rosemarie Gil. She had two brothers, Michael de Mesa and Mark Gil (1961–2014), both actors, and a half-sister, Elaine Eigenmann.

== Career ==
Gil started in show business at an early age, being the daughter of celebrities and sibling of actors. She was cast either as a daughter or part of a circle of friends of the lead actor. However, she was given a lead star status in Bubot na Bayabas in 1978 opposite another newcomer, Ronald Bregendahl (Rita Gomez and Ric Rodrigo's son). The movie was a forgettable release.

In 1979, film matriarch Lily Monteverde relaunched her via Problem Child with the then-current teen sensation, Lloyd Samartino. The movie fared mildly, and Gil was continually cast by Regal Films in films such as City After Dark, Salawahan, Ito Ba Ang Ating Mga Anak and Sugar Daddy. She went freelance with assignments like Beach House, Ang Bouncer at ang Dancer, Dancing Master, and Girlfriend. In 1982, Gil portrayed a naïve girl affected by World War II in Bacolod in the now classic film Oro, Plata, Mata.

She tried singing and had another mild hit, "I Love You, Boy".

On TV, she was one of the co-hosts of German Moreno in Germspesyal from 1979 to 1981. Gil became a mainstay of Champoy with Subas Herrero and Noel Trinidad from 1981 to 1986.

Gil resurfaced as a villain in 1985 via Viva Films' Bituing Walang Ningning, providing the lead actress Sharon Cuneta support in the role of Lavinia Arguelles, a famous but insecure singer. From this movie, she became famous for her iconic line, "You're nothing but a second rate, trying hard copycat!" The favorable reception led her to classy and sultry villainess roles, throughout the 1980s until the present.

She appeared in a number of hit teleseryes and primetime shows on ABS-CBN and GMA Network. She starred in numerous films and TV shows. She has performed in plays such as Master Class, playing Maria Callas; (PETA) Arbol de Fuego, an adaptation of Anton Chekov's The Cherry Orchard; and Full Gallop as Diana Vreeland, for which she won the Best Actress award for her one-woman portrayal in 2014.

In 2000–2001, Gil starred in her first soap, May Bukas Pa, which aired on IBC-13 and RPN-9 as part of Viva Entertainment TVs block timer. In 2002–2003 she appeared on ABS-CBN's Bituin, where she resumed her vocal talents. She also appeared in the 2004 TV series, Marina. In 2006, she took on the role as Menang Medel in the hit TV remake of Gulong ng Palad.

In 2007–2008, Gil played the role of Ayessa White / Frosta in Lastikman alongside Vhong Navarro. She played Amanda (originally played by Charito Solis in the 1983 film) as protagonist in Pieta alongside Ryan Agoncillo.

In 2010, she was chosen to star in the fantasy series Grazilda on GMA Network. In early 2011, she joined the cast of the comedy fantasy series Magic Palayok, co-starring Carla Abellana and Geoff Eigenmann. The series was not picked up for a second season after the season 1 finale. GMA Network cast her in another television show, Time of My Life. In the same year, she played the role of Maria Callas in Terrence McNally's award-winning play, Master Class, for which she received positive reviews.

Gil was one of 83 awardees of the Ani ng Dangal award from the National Commission for Culture and the Arts (NCCA), represented the cinema category on February 29, 2016. She simultaneously won the Best Actress award at the ASEAN Film Festival for her role in Sonata, and Best Actress in a foreign film at the Madrid Film festival for her portrayal in MANA, both in the same year. She got the major role as Luciana together with the most admired loveteam from 2015 to 2016, Lizquen, in Dolce Amore.

Her last acting role was in the GMA Network 2021 television series Legal Wives. In May 2021, she announced that she had left her role in an unspecified television series, lamenting that her efforts were not "seen and met in the same light".

== Personal life ==
Gil was a previous relationship with actor Leo Martinez where they had a son born in 1987. Gil was later married in 1994 to Rony Rogoff, an Israeli violinist; the couple had a daughter and a son. The family survived the 2004 Indian Ocean earthquake and tsunami, during which they vacationing in Phuket, Thailand. Gil and Rogoff’s relationship ended in 2008 after 14 years of marriage.

Shortly after their separation, Gil's two children with Rogoff were under his custody in Israel, while Gil's eldest son remained with her in the Philippines. All three children eventually resided in the United States. Gil reportedly reconciled with ex-husband Rogoff in 2021, deciding to be "companions" to each other.

=== Health issues and death ===
In October 2021, Gil was diagnosed with a rare form of endometrial cancer, and she chose to conceal information on her illness from the public. Her show business career ended in February 2022 when she moved to the United States to be with her children and prioritize her own "mental, emotional, [and] spiritual states". She also shaved her head to symbolize her "personal growth".

Gil died on August 5, 2022, at 4:48 a.m. EDT (4:48 p.m. PHT) from her cancer in New York City. Prior to her death, she had been receiving treatment at the Memorial Sloan Kettering Cancer Center in New York. Her brother, Michael, said that no final resting place was chosen, as Gil's remains were cremated in New York and some of her ashes were scattered in Bukidnon, her favorite place.

== Filmography ==
=== Film ===
Year	Title	Role	Notes	Source
1970	Bruka: Queen of Evil (She Yao Jing: Manda vs. Kung Fu)	Younger Manda / Bruka	Credited as "Cherie Gil"	
1973	Cofradia	Child / Younger Raquel Montesa		
1977	Beerhouse	Corazon		
1979	Dancing Master	Candy		
1980	Gabi ng Lagim Ngayon	La Luna		
1980	Manila by Night	Kano		
1980	Puga	Leonor Dimalanta		
1980	Beach House			
1980	Bubot Na Bayabas			
1980	Problem Child	Rita		
1980	Girlfriend			
1980	Beerhouse Dancers			
1980	Deadly Brothers	Flora		
1981	The Betamax Story			
1982	Ito Ba ang Ating Mga Anak?	Jenny		
1982	Oro, Plata, Mata	Trining Ojeda		
1982	No Other Love	Nurse	Guest role	
1982	Gaano Kadalas ang Minsan			
1983	M.I.B.: Men in Brief	Diana		
1983	Sana, Bukas Pa ang Kahapon	Ellen		
1984	Sa Hirap at Ginhawa	Karen		
1984	Imortal	Natasha Quintania		
1984	Bagets 2	Marinel		
1985	Kailan Sasabihing Mahal Kita?	Arianne Velez		
1985	Bituing Walang Ningning	Lavinia Arguelles		
1985	God, Save Me!	Edita		
1986	Palimos ng Pag-ibig	Verna Castillo		
1986	Sana'y Wala Nang Wakas	Monique Versoza		
1986	Bilanggo Sa Dilim	Marissa		
1987	Saan Nagtatago ang Pag-ibig?	Zeny		
1987	Saan Nagkamali Ang Pag-ibig?	Jasmin Romero-Bulaong		
1987	Jack & Jill	Susan		
1988	Hamunin ang Bukas...			
1988	Huwag Mong Itanong Kung Bakit	Aning		
1989	Jessa: Blusang Itim Part II	Lara Loren		
1989	Rosenda	Ria		
1989	Kahit Wala Ka Na	Debbie		
1989	Ang Bukas Ay Akin, Langit ang Uusig	Miriam		
1989	Ang Babaeng Nawawala sa Sarili	Oliva		
1990	Nagsimula sa Puso	Charie		
1990	Trese	Angie		
1990	Tayo Na sa Dilim	Mimosa		
1992	Ngayon at Kailanman	Donna Benitez		
1994	Sana Ay Ikaw Na Nga	Shirley Evangelista		
1994	Wating	Anya		
1994	Mars Ravelo's Darna! Ang Pagbabalik	Valentine		
2000	Ika-13 Kapitulo	Marge		
2000	Sugatang Puso	Miriam		
2003	My First Romance	Jackie's mother		
2004	Lastikman: Unang Banat	Editha / Lastika		
2006	Donsol	Mars		
2009	Agaton & Mindy	Tanya		
2010	Working Girls	Amanda Dela Vega		
2010	Father Jejemon	Violeta		
2012	My Kontrabida Girl			
2012	Sosy Problems	Martina Bertrand		
2013	A Moment in Time	Karen Linden		
2013	Ang Huling Henya	Chief Gabriel	Uncredited	
2013	Sonata	Regina Cadena	Also producer (as My Own Mann)	
2013	Ekstra	Herself / Doña Beatriz		
2015	Mana	Sandra		
2015	Baka Siguro Yata	Remy		
2015	Para sa Hopeless Romantic	Miss Katigbak		
2016	A Lullaby to the Sorrowful Mystery	Babae / Tikbalang		
2018	Kasal	Helen		
2019	Just a Stranger	Hilda	Guest role	
2019	Unforgettable	Customer	Guest role	
2019	Tia Madre	Emilia		
2020	Sensitive and in Love	Dr. Gina		
2020	Dangerous Beauty	Lucila	Short film	
2020	Magikland	Yndraiel		
2021	Elehiya	Dr. Celine de Miranda	Last film appearance	

=== Television / digital series ===
Year	Title	Role	Notes	Source
1980–1985	Champoy	Herself	Supporting cast	
1984–1986	Ito Yun, ang Galing!	Host		
1984–1989	Superstar	Co-host		
1987	Regal Shocker	Tessie	Episode: "Halimaw ng Dilim"; Credited as "Cherrie Gil"	
1991-1992	Cebu	Gemma dela Rosa		
1992	Maalaala Mo Kaya	Sonia	Episode: "Walis Tambo"; Credited as "Cherie Gil"	
1994	Bisperas ng Kasaysayan	Ma. Gabriela Luzuriaga		
2000–2001	May Bukas Pa	Divina Miguel		
2000	Maalaala Mo Kaya		Episode: "Postcard"	
2001–2003	Sa Puso Ko Iingatan Ka	Star / Nena		
2002–2003	Bituin	Carmela Gaston	Main cast / antagonist	
2004	Marina	Victoria Raymundo	Antagonist	
2006	Bahay Mo Ba 'To?	Tet Ano		
2006	Now and Forever: Dangal	Chandra		
2006	Gulong ng Palad	Philomena "Menang" Medel	Main Antagonist	
2007	Kemis: Ke Misis Umaasa	Clarisse		
2007	Sineserye Presents: May Minamahal	Becky Tagle		
2007–2008	Mars Ravelo's Lastikman	Ayessa White / Frosta		
2008–2009	Carlo J. Caparas' Pieta	Amanda Tupaz	Main cast / protagonist	
2009	Maalaala Mo Kaya	Romana	Episode: "Wheelchair"	
2009–2010	Katorse	Doña Margaret Arcanghel		
2010	Rubi	Sylvana Velasco-dela Fuente		
2010–2011	Grazilda	Veronne		
2011	Magic Palayok	Yvonne Ledesma		
2011	Time of My Life	Martha Llorico		
2012	Legacy	Eva Altamirano-Alcantara		
2012	Protégé: The Battle For The Big Artista Break	Herself – Judge		
2012–2013	Temptation of Wife	Stella Salcedo		
2013	Muling Buksan Ang Puso	Marietta Beltran		
2014	Ikaw Lamang	Señora Miranda Salazar-Hidalgo	Book 1	
2014	Wansapanataym	Stella Tuason	Episode: "My App #Boyfie"	
2015	Maalaala Mo Kaya	Maritess	Episode: "Takure"	
2015	The Half Sisters	Magnolia McBride	59 episodes	
2015	Magpakailanman	Magda	Episode: "Ina Ko, Bugaw Ko"	
2015	Single / Single	Bianca		
2016	Dolce Amore	Luciana Marchesa		
2016–2017	Alyas Robin Hood	Margarita "Maggie" Balbuena		
2017	Tadhana	Madam Bilal		
2018	Sirkus	La Ora / Laura		
2018	Barangay 143	Sophia Rivera	Dubbed voice	
2018	Dear Uge	Angelita Buensalida	Episode: "Terror Boss"	
2018–2019	Onanay	Helena Sanchez-Montenegro		
2019	Starstruck	Herself—Judge		
2019–2020	Beautiful Justice	Diorella Peñareyes		
2020	Tadhana	Cordella	Episode: "Hindi pa huli ang Umibig" (Parts 1 & 2)	
2021	Daddy's Gurl	Cherry Hills		
2021	Legal Wives	Zaina Guimba-Makadatu	Last TV appearance	

=== Theatre ===
Year	Title	Role	Notes	Source
2006	Doubt: A Parable	Sister Aloysius	Atlantis Theatricals; Carlos P. Romulo Auditorium, RCBC Plaza, Makati City	
2006	The Sound of Music	Baroness Elsa Schraeder	Repertory Philippines; Onstage Theater, Greenbelt 1, Makati City	
2008	Master Class	Maria Callas	Carlos P. Romulo Auditorium, RCBC Plaza, Makati City	
2012	Nine	Liliane La Fleur	Atlantis Theatricals; Carlos P. Romulo Auditorium, RCBC Plaza, Makati City	
2014	Full Gallop	Diana Vreeland	Carlos P. Romulo Auditorium, RCBC Plaza, Makati City	
2015	Arbol de Fuego	Enriquetta Jardeleza	Philippine Educational Theater Association (PETA); PETA Theater Center, Quezon City; Filipino-language adaptation of Anton Chekhov's "The Cherry Orchard" by Rody Vera	
2017	Vanya and Sonia and Masha and Spike	Masha	Repertory Philippines; Onstage Theater, Greenbelt 1, Makati City	
2019	Angels in America: Millennium Approaches	Hannah Pitt / Ethel Rosenberg / Rabbi Isidor Chemelwitz / Dr. Henry	Atlantis Theatrical Entertainment Group; Carlos P. Romulo Auditorium, RCBC Plaza, Makati City; Last Stage Appearance	

== Awards and nominations ==
Year	Work	Award	Category	Result	Source
1985	God... Save Me!	1985 Metro Manila Film Festival	Best Supporting Actress	Won	
1989	Imortal	1989 Metro Manila Film Festival	Best Supporting Actress	Won	
2000	Sugatang Puso	2000 Metro Manila Film Festival	Best Supporting Actress	Won	
2006	Gulong ng Palad	20th PMPC Star Awards for Television	Best Drama Actress	Nominated	
2014	Sonata	11th Golden Screen Awards	Best Performance by an Actress in a Leading Role (Drama)	Nominated	
2014	A Moment in Time	2014 FAMAS Awards	Best Supporting Actress	Nominated	
2014	Muling Buksan Ang Puso	28th PMPC Star Awards for Television	Best Drama Supporting Actress	Nominated	
2015	Mana	31st PMPC Star Awards for Movies	Movie Actress of the Year	Nominated	
2015	Mana	Madrid International Film Festival	Best Actress	Won	
2019	Citizen Jake	35th PMPC Star Awards for Movies	Movie Supporting Actress of the Year	Won	
