= Max Eigenmann =

Filipino actress

- Born: Maxine Eve Pimentel Eigenmann; September 29, 1987 (age 39); Parañaque, Metro Manila, Philippines
- Other name: Max
- Occupation: Actress
- Years active: 2008–present
- Children: 2
- Father: Mark Gil
- Relatives: Eigenmann family

Maxine Eve "Max" Pimentel Eigenmann (Tagalog pronunciation: [ˈaɪɡɛnmɐn]; born September 29, 1987) is a Filipino actress and singer.

== Personal life ==
Maxine Eve Pimentel Eigenmann is the daughter of actor Mark Gil and former beauty queen-turned-actress Bing Pimentel. Her brother is Sid Lucero. Through her father, she is a half-sister to Andi Eigenmann, Gabby Eigenmann and Ira Eigenmann. Her cousins are Ryan, Geoff and AJ Eigenmann.

She has two sons: Massi and Sandro with businessman and ex-boyfriend Norman Crisologo who is married to actress Beauty Gonzalez.

== Filmography ==
=== Film ===
Year	Title	Role	Notes	Source
2010	Romeo at Juliet	Menchi		
2012	Rigodon	Regine		
2013	Bingoleras	Dang	2013 CineFilipino Film Festival entry	
2014	Dagitab	Bulan / Lorena	Cinemalaya 2014 finalist	
2015	Bukod Kang Pinagpala	Stephanie	2015 Cinema One Originals entry	
2017	Ned's Project	Ashley		
2017	Kulay Lila ang Gabi Na Binudburan Pa ng Mga Bituin		QCinema Festival 2017 entry	
2017	Historiographika Errata	Leonor		
2018	Distance	Jen	Cinemalaya 2018 finalist	
2018	We Will Not Die Tonight	Che-Che	Pista ng Pelikulang Pilipino entry	
2019	Verdict	Joy Santos		
2021	Lockdown		Cinemalaya 2021's Indie Nation entry	
2022	12 Weeks	Alice	Cinemalaya 2022 finalist Best Filipino Film of 2022 of 3rd Pinoy Rebyu Awards	
2022	Kargo	Sara	Cinemalaya 2022 finalist Orient Express Best Film at the Fantasporto International Film Festival	
2023	Raging Grace	Joy	Winner of the Narrative Feature Jury Award and Thunderbird Rising Award for Best Debut at the 2023 South by Southwest (SXSW) Film Festival	
2025	Fatherland			
2026	The Loved One	Kyla		

=== Television ===
Year	Title	Role	Notes	Source
2008–2009	Lipgloss	Abby Rickson		
2009	Agimat: Ang Mga Alamat ni Ramon Revilla Presents : Tiagong Akyat	Norma Muñoz Ronquillo		
2009	Your Song	Giselle	Miniseries: "Sa Kanya Pa Rin"	
2010	Kung Tayo'y Magkakalayo	Anna Alicia Magdalena	Protagonist	
2015	Bridges of Love	Georgina Calix		
2019	Bagman	Donna		
2021	Stories from the Heart	Jackilyn "Jack" Kintanar	Episode: "Never Say Goodbye"	
2023	The Missing Husband	Leilani "Leila" Rosales-Gopez	Anti-Hero	
2026	The Master Cutter	Martina Regalia	Antagonist	

== Awards and nominations ==
Year	Work	Award	Category	Result	Source
2011	Romeo at Juliet	Golden Screen Awards	Breakthrough Performance by an Actress	Nominated	
2016	Ned's Project	CineFilipino Film Festival	Best Supporting Actress	Won	
2017	Historiographika Errata	Cinema One Originals Film Festival	Best Supporting Actress	Nominated	
2017	Kulay Lila ang Gabi na Binudburan pa ng mga Bituin	QCinema International Film Festival	Best Actress	Nominated	
2018	Kulay Lila ang Gabi na Binudburan pa ng mga Bituin	FAMAS Awards	Outstanding Performance by an Actress in a Leading Role	Nominated	
2019	Verdict	Asia Pacific Screen Awards	Best Performance by an Actress	Won	
2020	Verdict	Gawad Urian	Best Actress	Nominated	
2020	Verdict	Young Critics Circle	Best Performance by Male or Female, Adult or Child, Individual or Ensemble in Leading or Supporting Role (Note: Shared with Kristoffer King.)	Nominated	
2022	12 Weeks	18th Cinemalaya Independent Film Festival	Best Actress	Won	
2023	12 Weeks	3rd Pinoy Rebyu Awards	Best Lead Performance	Won	
2023	Kargo	2023 Asean International Film Festival and Awards	Best Actress	Won	
