= Rosemarie Gil =

Filipino actress and singer (born 1942)

- Born: Maria Rosa Francisca Catalina Gil y Castellvi; March 9, 1942 (age 84); Quiapo, Manila, Commonwealth of the Philippines
- Occupation: Actress
- Years active: 1958–2004; 2018–2019; 2022–present
- Spouse: Eddie Mesa (m. 1958)
- Children: Michael; Mark; Cherie
- Family: Eigenmann family

Rosemarie Gil (born Maria Rosa Francisca Catalina Gil de Eigenmann (Tagalog pronunciation: [ˈhil ˈaɪɡɛnmɐn]); born March 9, 1942), is a Filipino actress and singer. She is best known for her portrayal of rich socialite-villainess roles.

== Early life ==
Gil was born in Quiapo, Manila to Carlos Gil Jr. and Maria Dolores Castellvi. Her family owned a hacienda in Porac, Pampanga. She was educated at the elite Assumption Convent (now Assumption College).

== Career ==
Premiere Productions gave her the title role in her first film Sta. Rita De Casia (Patrona ng Imposible) (1958). She starred in various Americans films such as Night of the Cobra Woman (1972) and Naked Vengeance (1985), among others.

Gil married fellow actor-musician Eddie Mesa in 1958, putting her stardom on hold, while her husband enjoyed a career in the limelight. The couple eventually settled in the United States, separated and then reconciled.

She reclaimed her stardom in the 1970s upon her return, and starred in movies for international release. Her most remarkable film in the 1970s was Burlesk Queen, co-starring Vilma Santos, which scored her numerous awards. Throughout the 1980s and 1990s, Gil often appeared in drama films and teleseryes.

After leaving showbiz in 2004, Gil returned to acting in 2018.

== Personal life ==
She is married to her movie loveteam partner, Eddie Mesa. The couple has three children who also became award-winning thespians; Michael De Mesa, Mark Gil and Cherie Gil.

== Filmography ==
=== Film ===
Year	Title	Role	Notes
1972	Night of the Cobra Woman	Francisca	
1973	Fight Batman Fight!		
1976	Ganito Kami Noon... Paano Kayo Ngayon?	Concordia	
1977	Sinong Kapiling? Sinong Kasiping?		
1978	Mahal Mo, Mahal Ko	Conchita	
1980	4 na Maria	Hilda Madrigal	Guest Cast
1981	Bata Pa Si Sabel	Pepita	
1981	Dear Heart	Sylvia	
1981	Kasalanan Ba?	Mrs. Robles	
1981	Pagbabalik ng Panday		
1982	Hindi Kita Malimot	Doña Teresa Regatta	
1982	T-Bird at Ako	Mother	
1983	Gamu-gamo sa Pugad Lawin	Doña Matilde	
1983	Don't Cry for Me, Papa!	Arlene	Special Participation
1983	Dugong Buhay	Señora Rosela de Lara	
1984	Bagets	Arnel's mother	
1984	Tender Age	Tita Dolores	
1984	Hindi Mo Ako Kayang Tapakan	Monica Tuazon	
1984	14 Going Steady	Miss Liberty Dimalanta	
1984	May Daga sa Labas ng Lungga	Doña Patricia	
1985	Naked Vengeance	Jesse	
1986	Paalam! Bukas ang Kasal Ko!	Marita Martinez	
1987	Kung Aagawin Mo ang Lahat sa Akin	Doña Romina Samaniego	
1987	Anak ng Lupa	Mrs. Torres	
1988	Rosa Mistica	Doña Loleng	"Mga Dilaw Na Rosas ni Rosario" segment
1988	Sana Mahalin Mo Ako	Doña Carmen Cervantes	
1988	Matandang Barako, Hindi Pa Buro	Aunt of Elizabeth	
1988	Gawa Na ang Bala Na Papatay sa Iyo	Doña Carmela	
1989	3 Mukha ng Pag-ibig	Sylvia	"Katumbas ng Kahapon" segment
1989	Arrest: Pat. Rizal Alih – Zamboanga Massacre		
1989	Abot Hanggang Sukdulan	Inday Barredo	
1989	Wanted: Pamilya Banal	Elysse Banal	
1989	Isang Bala, Isang Buhay	Dolores' mother	
1990	Anak ni Baby Ama	Mrs. Lardizabal	
1991	Maging Sino Ka Man	Beatrice	
1991	Makiusap Ka sa Diyos	Mrs. Aaron	
1991	Shake, Rattle & Roll III	Lydia	"Yaya" segment
1992	Hiram Na Mukha	Tita Rose	
1994	Kapantay Ay Langit	Mrs. Yuson	
1994	Forever	Mrs. Campos	
1996	Maruja		
1996	Sa Aking mga Kamay	Camille's mom	
1998	Bata, Bata... Pa'no Ka Ginawa?	Mrs. Rosario Zalamea	
2000	Eto Na Naman Ako	Doña Josefa Madrigal	
2003	Pangarap Ko ang Ibigin Ka		
2018	Delia & Sammy		

- Sta. Rita De Casia (Patrona ng Imposible) (1958)
- Aawitan Kita (1959)
- Hawaiian Boy (1959)
- Krusaldo (1961)
- Dugo ng Bayani (1969)
- Mga Hagibis (1970)
- Avenida Boy (1971)
- Pagdating sa Dulo (1971)
- Kill the Pushers (1972)
- Pepeng Agimat (1973)
- Manda (Snakewoman) versus Kung Fu (1974) – released internationally as "Bruka, Queen of Evil"
- Biyenan Ko ang Aking Anak (1974)
- Mag-ingat Kapag Biyuda Ang Umibig (1975)
- Tatak ng Alipin (1975)
- Kung Bakit May Ulap ang Mukha ng Buwan (1976)
- Burlesk Queen (1977)
- Huwag Kang Malikot (1978)
- Okey Lang, Basta't Kapiling Kita (1979)
- Halik sa Paa, Halik sa Kamay (1979)
- Tonyong Bayawak (1979)
- Arnis (1979)
- Kadete (1979)
- 4 Na Maria (1980)
- Nympha (1980)
- Dear Heart (1981)
- Zimatar (1982)
- Hindi Kita Malimot (1982) as Doña Teresa
- Friends in Love (1983)
- Hindi Mo Ako Kayang Tapakan (1984) as Monica Tuazon
- Shake, Rattle & Roll (1984)
- Pati Ba Pintig ng Puso? (1985)
- Hello Lover, Goodbye Friend (1985) as Carlota "Lota" Delgado
- Yesterday, Today and Tomorrow (1986)
- Anak ni Zuma (1987)
- Lessons in Love (1990)
- Paniwalaan Mo (1993)
- Di Mapigil ang Init (1995)
- Sa Aking Mga Kamay (1996)
- Lea's Story (1998)
- Wansapanataym (1999) as Doña Tisay Enrique
- Minsan Minahal Kita (2000)
- Pagdating ng Panahon (2001)
- Magkapatid (2002)

=== Television ===
- Kapwa Ko Mahal Ko (TV programme) (1975-1998)
- Cebu / Cebu: Revisited (TV mini-series) (1991-1992) as Doña Clara dela Rosa
- Bisperas ng Kasaysayan (TV miniseries) (1994) as Doña Corazon vda. de Luzuriaga
- Anna Karenina (TV series) (1996) as Doña Carmela Cruz-Monteclaro
- May Bukas Pa (TV series) (2000–2001) as Rodora Suarez
- Noriega: God's Favorite (TV movie) (2000)
- Sa Puso Ko, Iingatan Ka (TV series) (2001) as Emilia Villamines
- Hiram (TV series) (2004) as Doña Carolina Verdadero
- Ngayon at Kailanman (TV series) (2018) as Doña Carmen Alipio-Cortes

== Awards and nominations ==
Year	Award	Category	Work	Result
1974	FAMAS Award	Best Supporting Actress	Florinda (1973)	Nominated
1977	Metro Manila Film Festival	Best Supporting Actress	Burlesk Queen (1977)	Won
1978	Gawad Urian Award	Best Supporting Actress	Burlesk Queen (1977)	Nominated
1978	FAMAS Award	Best Supporting Actress	Burlesk Queen (1977)	Nominated
1982	FAMAS Award	Best Supporting Actress	Dear Heart (1981)	Nominated
