= 2nd PMPC Star Awards for Television =

- Date: October 15, 1988
- Location: Smart Araneta Coliseum, Quezon City

Television/radio coverage
- Network: ABS-CBN
- Produced by: Airtime Marketing Philippines, Inc.

The 2nd PMPC Star Awards for Television ceremony was held at the Smart Araneta Coliseum, Quezon City on October 15, 1988, and broadcast over ABS-CBN Channel 2. The ceremony was directed by Al Quinn.

== Nominees ==
These are the nominations for the 2nd Star Awards for Television. The winners are in bold.

=== Best TV station ===
- ABS-CBN-2
- PTV-4
- **GMA-7**
- RPN-9
- IBC-13

=== Best Drama Serial ===
- Agila (RPN 9)
- Gintong Krystal (GMA 7)
- Gulong ng Palad

=== Best Drama Series ===
- Balintawtaw (PTV 4)
- Coney Reyes on Camera (RPN 9)
- Lovingly Yours, Helen (GMA 7)
- Maricel Regal Drama Special (ABS-CBN 2)
- Princess (GMA 7)

=== Best Drama Actor ===
- Rey Abellana (K / IBC 13)
- Robert Arevalo (Balintawtaw / PTV 4)
- Ronald Corveau (Gulong ng Palad / RPN 9)
- **Juan Rodrigo (Banyuhay / RPN 9)**
- Roi Vinzon (K / IBC 13)

=== Best Drama Actress ===
- Precious Hipolito (Stop Child Abuse / ABS-CBN 2)
- Princess Punzalan (Princess / GMA 7)
- Coney Reyes (Coney Reyes on Camera / RPN 9)
- Caridad Sanchez (Gulong ng Palad)
- Aurora Sevilla (Agila / RPN 9)
- **Maricel Soriano (Maricel Regal Drama Special / ABS-CBN 2)**
- Helen Vela (Agila / RPN 9)

=== Best Comedy Show ===
- Chika Chika Chicks (ABS-CBN 2)
- Goin' Bananas (ABS-CBN 2)
- John en Marsha (RPN 9)
- Hapi House (IBC 13)
- Palibhasa Lalake (ABS-CBN 2)
- **Sic O'Clock News (IBC 13)**
- T.O.D.A.S.: Totally Outrageous Delightful All-Star Show (IBC 13)

=== Best Comedy Actor ===
- Joey de Leon (T.O.D.A.S.: Totally Outrageous Delightful All-Star Show / IBC 13)
- Dolphy (John en Marsha / RPN 9)
- **Jaime Fabregas (Sic O'Clock News / IBC 13)**
- Joey Marquez (Palibhasa Lalake / ABS-CBN 2)
- Roderick Paulate (Tipitipitim Tipitom / RPN 9)
- Vic Sotto (Okay Ka Fairy Ko / IBC 13)
- Lou Veloso (Pubhouse / IBC 13)

=== Best Comedy Actress ===
- Nida Blanca (John en Marsha / RPN 9)
- Vangie Labalan (Ayos Lang, Tsong! / IBC 13)
- Cynthia Patag (Palibhasa Lalake / ABS-CBN 2)
- Tiya Pusit (Kasi Nga Babae)
- Chanda Romero (Pubhouse / IBC 13)
- **Gloria Romero (Palibhasa Lalake / ABS-CBN 2)**
- Aiza Seguerra (Okay Ka Fairy Ko / IBC 13)
- Nova Villa (Chika Chika Chicks / ABS-CBN 2)

=== Best Musical Variety Show ===
- Loveli-Ness (IBC 13)
- Martin and Pops Twogether (ABS-CBN 2)
- The Sharon Cuneta Show (ABS-CBN 2)
- Superstar (RPN 9)
- **Vilma (GMA 7)**

=== Best Variety Show ===
- Eat Bulaga! (RPN 9)
- **GMA Supershow (GMA 7)**
- Good Morning Showbiz (GMA 7)
- Lunch Date (GMA 7)
- That's Entertainment (GMA 7)

=== Best Female TV Host ===
- Nora Aunor (Superstar / RPN 9)
- Sharon Cuneta (The Sharon Cuneta Show / ABS-CBN 2)
- Pops Fernandez (Martin and Pops: Twogether / ABS-CBN 2)
- Alma Moreno (Loveli-Ness / IBC 13)
- **Vilma Santos (Vilma / GMA 7)**

=== Best Male TV Host ===
- Joey de Leon (The Sharon Cuneta Show / ABS-CBN 2)
- Bert Marcelo (Loveli-Ness / IBC 13)
- **German Moreno (GMA Supershow / GMA 7)**
- Martin Nievera (Martin and Pops: Twogether / ABS-CBN 2)
- Randy Santiago (Lunch Date / GMA 7)

=== Best Musical Special ===
- 25 + 1: A Double Celebration (GMA 7)
- Aiza Seguerra: Bow (RPN 9)
- Dolphy's Diamond Dragon (IBC 13)
- The Heat is On (IBC 13)
- Here's to the Ladies: Zsa Zsa Padilla Special (ABS-CBN 2)
- Jose Mari Chan Special (RPN 9)
- Your Evening With Pilita (RPN 9)

=== Best Public Service Program ===
- Bahay Kalinga (ABS-CBN 2)
- Damayan (PTV 4)
- Kapwa Ko Mahal Ko (GMA 7)
- Pananagutan

=== Best Public Service Program Host ===
- Ben Canlas and Tina Ferreros (Pananagutan)
- Cielo del Mundo (Kapwa Ko, Mahal Ko / GMA 7)
- Mike Lacanilao and Mel Tiangco (Bahay Kalinga / ABS-CBN 2)
- Rosa Rosal (Damayan / PTV 4)

=== Best Game Show ===
- Date a Star (GMA 7)
- Family Kuarta o Kahon (RPN 9)
- Game na Game (ABS-CBN 2)
- Just for Fun (GMA 7)
- Super Swerte sa Nueve (RPN 9)

=== Best Game Show Host ===
- Jackie Lou Blanco, Cynthia Patag and Mark Gil (Date a Star / GMA 7)
- Tirso Cruz III and Pinky Marquez (Game na Game / ABS-CBN 2)
- Joey de Leon (Super Swerte sa Nueve / RPN 9)
- Roderick Paulate (Just for Fun / GMA 7)
- Pepe Pimentel (Family Kuarta o Kahon / RPN 9)

=== Best Talent Program ===
- Ang Bagong Kampeon (RPN 9)
- Sali Kami
- Tawag ng Tanghalan (ABS-CBN 2)

=== Best Talent Program Host ===
- Pilita Corrales and Bert Marcelo (Ang Bagong Kampeon / RPN 9)
- Frankie Evangelista, Nanette Inventor and Danny Javier (Tawag ng Tanghalan / ABS-CBN 2)
- Helen Gamboa and Tito Sotto (Sali Kami)

=== Best Educational Program ===
- Ating Alamin (PTV 4)
- Beauty Secrets (IBC 13)
- Cooking with Nora Daza (ABS-CBN 2)
- Lutong Bahay (RPN 9)
- Tele-Aralan ng Kakayahan (PTV 4)

=== Best Educational Program Host ===
- Nora Daza (Cooking with Nora Daza / ABS-CBN 2)
- Cecilia Garuncho (Tele-Aralan ng Kakayahan / PTV 4)
- Gerry Geronimo (Ating Alamin / PTV 4)
- Ricky Reyes (Beauty Secrets / IBC 13)
- Tita Betty (Lutong Bahay / RPN 9)

=== Best Celebrity Talk Show ===
- **Not So Late Night with Edu (ABS-CBN 2)**
- Oh No, It's Johnny! (ABS-CBN 2)

=== Best Celebrity Talk Show Host ===
- Johnny Litton (Oh No, It's Johnny! / ABS-CBN 2)
- **Edu Manzano (Not So Late Night with Edu / ABS-CBN 2)**

=== Best Magazine Show ===
- 30/30 (IBC 13)
- Apple Pie, Patis, Atbp. (RPN 9)
- Isip Pinoy (RPN 9)
- Magandang Umaga Po (ABS-CBN 2)
- PEP Talk (ABS-CBN 2)
- The Probe Team (GMA 7)
- Showbiz Talk of the Town (RPN 9)
- Travel Time (IBC 13)

=== Best Magazine Show Host ===
- Lee Andres (30/30 / IBC 13)
- Susan Calo-Medina (Travel Time / IBC 13)
- Noli de Castro (Magandang Umaga Po / ABS-CBN 2)
- Joey de Leon (Apple Pie, Patis, Atbp. / RPN 9)
- Cheche Lazaro (The Probe Team / GMA 7)
- Portia Ilagan (Showbiz Talk of the Town / RPN 9)
- Loren Legarda (PEP Talk / ABS-CBN 2)
- Vic Sumulong (Isip Pinoy / RPN 9)

=== Best News Program ===
- GMA Balita (GMA 7)
- GMA Headline News (GMA 7)
- TV Patrol (ABS-CBN 2)
- The World Tonight (ABS-CBN 2)

=== Best Male Newscaster ===
- Angelo Castro, Jr. (The World Tonight / ABS-CBN 2)
- **Noli de Castro (TV Patrol / ABS-CBN 2)**
- Frankie Evangelista (TV Patrol / ABS-CBN 2)
- Mike Lacanilao (GMA Balita / GMA 7)
- Jose Mari Velez (GMA Headline News / GMA 7)

=== Best Female Newscaster ===
- Loren Legarda (The World Tonight / ABS-CBN 2)
- Tina Monzon-Palma (GMA Headline News / GMA 7)
- Cathy Santillan (Newswatch Evening Edition / RPN 9)
- Mel Tiangco (TV Patrol / ABS-CBN 2)
- Helen Vela (GMA Balita / GMA 7)

=== Best Public Affairs Program ===
- Issues and Answers (GMA 7)
- People's Privilege Hour (PTV 4)
- Public Forum (IBC 13)
- Straight from the Shoulder (GMA 7)
- Tapatan Kay Louie Beltran (IBC 13)
- Tell the People (RPN 9)
- Viewpoint (GMA 7)
- Weekend with Velez (GMA 7)
- Womanwatch (PTV 4)

=== Best Public Affairs Program Host ===
- Louie Beltran (Straight from the Shoulder / GMA 7)
- Louie Beltran (Tapatan Kay Louie Beltran / IBC 13)
- Art Borjal (Issues and Answers / GMA 7)
- Nikki Coseteng (Womanwatch / PTV 4)
- **Randy David (Public Forum / IBC 13)**
- Alice Reyes (People's Privilege Hour / PTV 4)
- Jose Mari Velez (Weekend with Velez / GMA 7)
- Julie Yap-Daza (Tell the People / RPN 9)

=== Best Movie Talk Show ===
- Cinemascoop (ABS-CBN 2)
- Eye to Eye (GMA 7)
- Rumors, Facts and Humors (ABS-CBN 2)
- Showbiz Eye (IBC 13)

=== Best Movie Talk Show Host ===
- Inday Badiday (Eye to Eye / (GMA 7)
- Boy de Guia (Cinemascoop / ABS-CBN 2)
- Alfie Lorenzo (Rumors, Facts and Humors / ABS-CBN 2)
- Lolit Solis (Showbiz Eye / IBC 13)

=== Best Children Show ===
- Batibot (RPN 9)
- Penpen de Sarapen (RPN 9)
- Kulit Bulilit (IBC 13)
- Ora Engkantada (IBC 13)

=== Best Children Show Host ===
- Connie Angeles (Penpen de Sarapen / RPN 9)
- Luz Fernandez (Ora Engkantada / IBC 13)
- Bodjie Pascua (Batibot / RPN 9)

== Special awards ==
=== Ading Fernando Lifetime Achievement Awardee ===
- Chichay
- Dominic Salustiano

=== Star Awards for Broadcasting Excellence ===
- Frankie Evangelista (Male)
- Nikki Coseteng (Female)

=== Best Cultural Musical Program ===
- Aawitan Kita

=== Most Promising TV Personality ===
- Alice Dixson
- Jenjon Otico
- Melissa Perez Rubio
- Whitney Tyson

== See also ==
- PMPC Star Awards for TV
