= 1984 in Philippine television =

The following is a list of events affecting Philippine television in 1984. Events listed include television show debuts, finales, cancellations, and channel launches, closures and rebrandings, as well as information about controversies and carriage disputes.

== Events ==
- May 14: Philippine TV channels broadcast non-stop coverage of the 1984 Philippine parliamentary election.
- July 30 – Tito, Vic & Joey De leon Celebrated 5th Anniversary Eat Bulaga!

== Premieres ==
Date	Show
March 25	PBA on Vintage Sports on MBS 4
May 19	Coney Reyes on Camera on RPN 9
July 23	Heredero on RPN 9
August 21	Viewpoint on GMA 7

=== Unknown ===
- At Your Serbis, Matutina on BBC 2
- BBC Balita (2nd incarnation) on BBC 2
- Carmi on BBC 2
- Lovingly Yours, Helen on BBC 2
- Pssssst! on BBC 2
- Family Kuarta o Kahon on RPN 9
- La Aunor on RPN 9
- Nora Cinderella on RPN 9
- Kaluskos-Musmos on RPN 9
- Today at the Games on RPN 9
- Mid-day Report on IBC 13
- Ambus Modus on GMA 7
- U.F.O.: Urbano, Felissa & Others on GMA 7
- Daigdig ng mga Artista sa Telebisyon on GMA 7
- Hotel on GMA 7
- Miami Vice on GMA 7
- Murder, She Wrote on GMA 7
- Who's the Boss on GMA 7
- Scholastic Sports Academy on GMA 7
- Business Talks on MBS 4
- Inquiry on MBS 4
- Trends on MBS 4
- Salamat Mr. Robot on MBS 4

== Returning or renamed programs ==
Show	Last aired	Retitled as/Season/Notes	Channel	Return date
Philippine Basketball Association	1983 (City2; season 9: "Open Conference")	Same (season 10: "First All-Filipino Conference")	MBS	March 25
Major League Baseball	1983 (MBS)	Same (1984 season)	City2 (now BBC)	April
Coney Reyes - Mumar on the Set	1984	Coney Reyes on Camera	RPN	May 19
Philippine Basketball Association	1984 (season 10: "First All-Filipino Conference")	Same (season 10: "Second All-Filipino Conference")	MBS	August 5
Philippine Basketball Association	1984 (season 10: "Second All-Filipino Conference")	Same (season 10: "Invitational championship")	MBS	November 18
City 2 Balita	1984 (City2)	BBC Balita (2nd incarnation)	BBC	Unknown

== Programs transferring networks ==
Date	Show	No. of seasons	Moved from	Moved to
March 25	Philippine Basketball Association	10	City2 (now BBC)	MBS
Unknown	Family Kuarta o Kahon	—N/a	BBC	RPN
Unknown	Lovingly Yours, Helen	—N/a	GMA	BBC

== Finales ==
- May 12: Coney Reyes - Mumar on the Set on RPN 9

=== Unknown ===
- At Your Serbis, Matutina on BBC 2
- Carmi on BBC 2
- City2 Balita on City2
- Blu: Bernardo, Lorenzo, Ulysses on BBC 2
- Jessie on BBC 2
- Sapak na Sapak Talaga! on BBC 2
- Family Kuarta o Kahon on BBC 2
- Flordeluna on RPN 9
- La Aunor on RPN 9
- Julian Talisman on RPN 9
- Duplex on RPN 9
- Olympic Library on RPN 9
- Today at the Games on RPN 9
- Salamin ng Buhay on IBC 13
- This is It! on IBC 13
- Sesame! on RPN 9
- Lovingly Yours, Helen on GMA 7
- Ambus Modus on GMA 7
- Cafeteria Aroma (3rd incarnation) on GMA 7
- Geebees' Sine-TV Balita on GMA 7
- Suerte sa Siete on GMA 7
- Mork & Mindy on GMA 7
- That's Incredible on GMA 7
- Scholastic Sports Academy on GMA 7
- Miss Ellaneous on MBS 4
- Take Two for the Road on MBS 4
- Salamat Mr. Robot on MBS 4

== Births ==
- January 12 - Oyo Boy Sotto, actor
- January 20 – Toni Gonzaga, singer, television host and actress
- January 20 - Maeanne Los Baños-Oroceo, news anchor
- January 21 – Richard Gutierrez, actor and commercial model and his twin brother Raymond Gutierrez, actor and television host
- March 10 - Paolo Contis, actor and comedian
- March 11 - Bernard Cardona, television host and actor
- March 28 - Joseph Bitangcol, actor and dancer
- May 23 – Sam Milby, Filipino-American actor, commercial model, and recording artist
- June 6 - Angela Lagunzad, journalist, TV host
- July 16 – Ginger Conejero, TV reporter and host
- July 19 – Alessandra De Rossi, actress
- July 24 -
  - Pia Gutierrez, news reporter
  - Boy 2 Quizon, comedian and actor
- August 10 – Mariel Rodriguez, commercial model, television host and actress
- August 12 – Marian Rivera, commercial model and actress
- August 24 - Teresa Garcia, Broadcaster, TV Personality
- September 22 - Marcelito Pomoy, singer
- November 13 - Dimples Romana, actress.
- November 28 – Joross Gamboa, actor
- November 29 – Sitti Navarro, bossa nova singer
- December 8 – Hero Angeles, actor
- December 10 – Krista Ranillo, actress
- December 20 – Liezel Garcia, singer-songwriter and actress
- December 30 – Rico Barrera

== Deaths ==
- February 10 - Claudia Zobel, actress
- February 17 - Ading Fernando

== See also ==
- 1984 in television
