= List of Valiente (2012 TV series) characters =

This article contains cast and character information of the TV5 Epic drama Valiente.

== Main cast ==
=== Gardo Valiente ===
- Gardo Soledad Valiente / Nicolas Vallejo / Gardo Soledad Braganza
  - Portrayed by JC de Vera and Ross Fernando (Young)

He is the son of Damian and Luming Valiente. Born from a poor family of farmers in the Hacienda Braganza, grew up as a kind and loving son to his parents. He is Theo's childhood best friend brought by his father's friendship to Don Armando, but their friendship will be marked, tested and will loosen by Donya Trining. Despite the hindrances brought by the Braganza's, he will continuously fight for his love to Maila. A night came when Theo attempted to kill him after burning his face on a fire that scarred his face. Don Luis accidentally saw him on a place where he was left bloodied by a gunshot wound. On that day, Don Luis helped him and later together planned a revenge to the Braganza's. He changed his name as Nicholas Vallejo and studied a lot about the business especially in the field of the corporate world. He returned as a rich young businessman to whom the Braganza's in need in help to save their company from bankruptcy. His real identity will be Donya Trining's biggest barrier to her ambitions. He is Don Armando's hidden son to Luming and the only and real Braganza.

=== Theo Braganza ===
- Theo Delos Reyes Braganza / Theo Delos Reyes Ramirez
  - Portrayed by Oyo Sotto and Arvic Rivero (Young)

Eldest child of Don Armando and Donya Trining Braganza. Born from a prominent and wealthy family of hacienderos in San Rafael, he will be the heir of the Hacienda Braganza. He was Gardo's best friend and will be its mortal enemy. His obedience and faithfulness to his mother will be the reason to break his friendship with Gardo. He was the one who accidentally killed Luming Soledad Valiente, Gardo's mother when he was young and playing his late father's gun. His real identity will be uncovered brought by Grado's real identity. His real father was Donya Trining's right manipulative hand, Peping Ramirez.

=== Leona Braganza ===
- Leona Delos Reyes Braganza
  - Portrayed by Niña Jose and Czarina Suzara (Young)

Second child of Don Armando and Donya Trining Braganza. She inherited her mother's intelligence, wisdom and temperament. All of the things she wants she gets, aside from Gardo to whom she was obsessively in love. She will do everything to get Gardo from Maila. She was raped by an anonymous man to whom she got her child that made her lose her consciousness together with Gardo's set-up that was brought in her wedding.

=== Maila Braganza ===
- Maila Delos Reyes Braganza/Maila Regalado Ilagan-Valiente
  - Portrayed by Nadine Samonte and Lianne Valentin (Young)

Third child and adopted daughter of Don Armando and Donya Trining Braganza. Treated as a real daughter by Don Armando. When Don Armando died, she was left in manila to continue her studies while her brother Theo and Leona is in abroad to study. When she finished her studies, she returned to her native town, San Rafael where she will again saw Gardo. Victorino Penitente, her godfather gave her the management of the Bahay Pangarap, an orphanage. Her love and affection to Gardo will be tested many times by her family especially Donya Trining. Her real mother is Mila Regalado-Arden who left her on Bahay Pangarap Foundation, an orphanage.

=== Donya Trining Braganza ===
- Donya Trinidad "Trining" Delos Reyes - (Ramirez) Braganza / Mayor Trining Braganza
  - Portrayed by Jaclyn Jose and Kathleen Hermosa (Young)

The prime villainess of the series. A woman raised from poverty, came to be wealthy and prominent with the use of her beauty and wisdom. She was once a nurse of Don Armando. She wanted to be wealthy like that of Donya Corazon that's why she planned to be a Braganza together with Peping, her secret husband. One night while giving Armando his medicine, Trining tempt him. She became Don Armando's wife and the root cause of wickedness in the Hacienda Braganza and San Rafael. She caused Don Armando's death to thoroughly obtain the Braganza's wealth and power. She will make sure that her children were all in the right place and in the right people. She is the hindrance between Gardo and Maila's love. She is the cause of Gardo's vengeance against the Braganzas. Because of her great ambition, she became the Mayor of San Rafael with the help of Vincent Lee and Don Luis.

Her true identity revealed as she suffered her downfall made by Gardo Valiente. Her mother, Minerva Magbanua once made her a prostitute when she was a teenager. She suffered hardships and poverty vowed her to be wealthy. Her husband Peping, helped her in her ambitions. Soon she reached her dreams and became what she was.

=== Ka Damian Valiente ===
- Damian Valiente
  - Portrayed by Michael de Mesa and Biboy Ramirez (Young)

A good and patient best friend and right hand of Don Armando in manipulating the Hacienda. He was Ramon and Delia Valiente's only son, born and studied in San Ildefonso but worked in San Rafael; became Don Armando and Don Luis best friend. He is Gardo's father and Luming's husband. He is the leader of hacienda's workers to which Donya Trining's rival to Don Armando in terms of regulating the hacienda. He will suffer pain and hardships brought by the death of his best friend, Don Armando and his wife, Luming. He will be suffering maltreatment by Donya Trining in all of his ways and decisions. He had a hidden secret that was the real identity of Gardo, Luming's son to Don Armando.

=== Peping Ramirez ===
- Pepito "Peping" Ramirez
  - Portrayed by John Regala

Donya Trining's loyal right hand in manipulating Hacienda Braganza and San Rafael. He was Donya Trining's first husband, brought to a plan for a better life planned by Trining. He is the real father of Theo. His life was engaged in many deaths brought by his hands and gun to protect Trining's desires and his son's sake. He caused the death of a farmer, Ariston's father; a businessman, Vincent Lee; and he planned many times Gardo's death.

== Supporting cast ==
=== Don Armando Braganza ===
- Don Armando Braganza †
  - Portrayed by Mark Gil and Cogie Domingo (Young)

Don Armando Braganza is a haciendero who owns Hacienda Braganza. He is the husband of Donya Trining and the father of Theo, Leona, and Maila. He is particularly close to Theo and his adopted daughter, Maila. He taught Theo about managing the hacienda. He is a childhood friend of Damian Valiente, a farmer who works on the hacienda. His decisions concerning the hacienda and its farmers are often referred to Damian. His illness becomes a factor in Donya Trining's efforts to obtain his family's wealth and power. His past also affects the lives of Gardo and Theo and creates conflict with Donya Trining's ambitions.

=== Luming Valiente ===
- Iluminada "Luming" Soledad-Valiente †
  - Portrayed by Gina Alajar and Ciara Sotto (Young)

A loving and thoughtful wife and mother to Damian and Gardo. She is a brave woman who is ready to oppose Donya Trining's greediness. She has a past that will change her son's life and fate. She was accidentally shot dead by Theo on her way home from market.

=== Tito Victorino ===
- Victorino Penitente
  - Portrayed by Tony Mabesa

A former priest and is currently the owner of Bahay Pangarap, an orphanage. He is one of Don Armando's friends.

=== Ariston ===
- Ariston Bugayon
  - Portrayed by Jaime Pebanco

A farmer on the Hacienda Braganza that has a dark past with Donya Trining. His father and siblings were all brutally killed by Donya Trining's right hand, Peping after his father shown an impolite talk against Donya Trining on a conference. He was left and adopted by Damian and Luming after what happened to him.

=== Mayor Manding ===
- Mayor Manding
  - Portrayed by Menggie Cobarrubias

The Mayor of San Rafael and a friend of the Braganza's.

=== Donya Corazon ===
- Donya Corazon Braganza †
  - Portrayed by Racquel Villavicencio

The widowed mother of Don Armando and the matriarch of the Hacienda Braganza. She opposed Don Armando and Luming's love affair, which caused Luming to hide her child to Armando. She also opposed Trining and Armando's love affair.

=== Jody ===
- Jody
  - Portrayed by Meg Imperial

Theo's personal assistant and secretary to whom he had a son named Theodore.

=== Vivian ===
- Vivian
  - Portrayed by Sunshine Garcia

Damian's niece to whom he lived for a while to find Gardo. She was a G.R.O./prostitute that once served Theo on a bar. Theo from then had fallen in love to her.

=== Atty Manalad ===
- Attorney Rey Manalad
  - Portrayed by Joel Saracho

The labor union's trusted lawyer from whom they seek legal assistance in all decisions they made.

=== Ricky ===
- Ricky Valiente
  - Portrayed by Nicco Manalo

Gardo's cousin and an ally for the planned downfall of the Braganza's.

=== Tess ===
- Tess
  - Portrayed by Erika Padilla

Maila's best friend.

=== Dexter ===
- Dexter de Oro
  - Portrayed by Andrew Schimmer

Son of the prominent and wealthy family of De Oro's. He was once used by Donya Trining to catch the responsibility for Leona's pregnancy to be Leona's husband. He was poisoned by Leona.

== Guest cast ==
=== Don Luis ===
- Don Luis De Jesus Regalado
  - Portrayed by Tirso Cruz III and Joross Gamboa (Young)

The one who saved Gardo from death, helped and used him in revenge to the Braganza's. He was the son of Don Eduardo and Donya Amelia Regalado and the only brother of Mila Regalado. He was once a business opponent to Don Armando Braganza. In Donya Corazon's commandment, his entire family was brutally burned and killed. From then on, he planned a revenge after his return from going abroad.

== Extended cast ==
=== Mila Arden ===
- Milagros De Jesus Regalado-(Ilagan)Arden
  - Portrayed by Lorna Tolentino and Justin Rosana (Young)

An intelligent, brave and luxurious woman but known for being frank and silent person. She is the daughter of Don Eduardo and Donya Amelia Regalado, prominent hacienderos of San Ildefonso, a nearby town to San Rafael. She is Don Luis' younger sister who married an American and lived in United States until she managed her Real Estate business. She is currently the COO and Acquisitions Director of the Crimson Estates, the leading real estate corporation on Europe, Asia and America. She will make revenge to Gardo for she thought that Gardo is the reason of her brother's death. She will use her position in the business industry and her relation to Don Luis to recover all the Regalado Properties. Her past will uncover Maila's identity. She had given birth to a girl several years ago and left it in an orphanage.

=== Elaine Lee ===
- Elaine Lee-Braganza
  - Portrayed by Roxanne Guinoo

The daughter of Vincent Lee who is forced to marry Theo Braganza in an arranged marriage. She will be trapped to an unhappy marriage with Theo because he did not love her but Vivian. She will take revenge to the Braganza's along with Gardo as her accomplice.

=== Minerva ===
- Minerva Magbanua
  - Portrayed by Odette Khan

The mother of Donya Trining Braganza who suffered Syphilis and Dementia that affected her mental consciousness and memory.

=== Joel ===
- Joel Gatchalian
  - Portrayed by James Blanco

A rich young man who becomes the boyfriend of Maila and a friend to Theo.

=== Simon ===
- Simon
  - Portrayed by Allan Paule and Mico Aytona (young)

Mila's personal fiduciary that was once a colleague when they were rebels.

=== Javier ===
- Javier Ilagan
  - Portrayed by Alwyn Uytingco (Young)

Mila's rebel husband.

=== Martha ===
- Martha
  - Portrayed by Frances Ignacio

She is Don Luis' personal secretary and ally in his vengeance to the Braganza's.

=== Vincent Lee ===
- Vincent Lee
  - Portrayed by Toby Alejar

A wealthy Chinese businessman who becomes Donya Trining's ally. He will pursue his daughter Elaine to marry Theo to bind their families. He will help Donya Trining in saving to bankruptcy of the Braganza's sugar refinery business.

=== Miguel Magno ===
- Miguel Magno
  - Portrayed by Ramon Christopher Gutierrez

A politician who’ll be Donya Trining's political opponent when she runs as mayor of San Rafael.

== See also ==
- Valiente (2012 TV series)
