= Ang Munting Paraiso =

1999–2002 Philippine television drama series

- Title card
- Genre: Drama
- Directed by: Ricky Davao†; Malu L. Sevilla
- Starring: Coney Reyes; Ronaldo Valdez
- Opening theme: "Ang Munting Paraiso"
- Ending theme: "Ang Munting Paraiso"
- Composers: Homer Flores; Jose Bartolome
- Country of origin: Philippines
- Original language: Tagalog
- No. of episodes: 159

Production
- Executive producer: Ellen Rodriguez
- Running time: 60 minutes
- Production companies: ABS-CBN Studios; CAN Television and Productions

Original release
- Network: ABS-CBN
- Release: March 6, 1999 – June 1, 2002

Ang Munting Paraiso (transl. the little paradise) is a Philippine television drama series broadcast by ABS-CBN. Directed by Ricky Davao† and Malu L. Sevilla, starring Coney Reyes in the title role. It aired on the network's Saturday afternoon line up from March 6, 1999 to June 1, 2002, replacing Coney Reyes on Camera and was replaced by Tanging Yaman: The Series.

== Premise ==
The program, literary translates "Little Paradise", portrays the contemporary Filipino family based on the American television series 7th Heaven. It is about the Dionisio family through which the creators aims to depict a role model for Filipino family.

== Cast and characters ==
=== Main cast ===
- Coney Reyes as Margarita "Margie" Dionisio
- Ronaldo Valdez† as Dr. Martin Dionisio

=== Supporting cast ===
- CJ Ramos as Diego "Digoy" Dionisio
- Sarah Christophers as Carolina "Carol" Dionisio
- Jericho Rosales as Alberto "Albert" Dionisio
- Anne Villegas as Gunding Dionisio
- Camilla Villamil as Erika "Ikay" Dionisio
- Sheila Marie Rodriguez as Beatrice "Bea" Dionisio
- Kristine Hermosa as Rowena, Alberto's love interest
- Norman Hernandez as Homer
- Karlyn Bayot as Jamie

=== Guest cast ===
- Luz Fernandez†
- Julia Clarete as Susan
- Lui Manansala
- Errol Dionisio as Kadyo
- Jeff Long
- Aurora Halili as Jenny
- Carmi Martin as Lora
- Toby Alejar as Dante
- Carlos Agassi
- Donnie Fernandez
- Michael Roy Jornales as Luigi
- Jovy Long
- Daniel King Reyes
- Raquel Montessa
- Dimples Romana
- Tanya Garcia
- Alessandra De Rossi
- Laura James
- Crystal Gayle Valencia
- Jacqueline Co
- Andrei Felix
- Melissa Avelino
- Rodney Shattara as Boom
- Leo Gamboa
- Ernie Zarate† as Lolo Ingo (Domingo Villanueva, Margie and Molong's father)
- Dominic Ochoa as Jimmy
- Rez Cortez
- Jaime Blanch
- Nino Alejandro
- Jaclyn Jose†
- Efren Reyes Jr.
- Kristopher Peralta
- Lara Fabregas
- Tracy Vergel as Ivy
- Jennifer Illustre
- Sirk Cortez
- Juan Rodrigo
- Chat Silayan†
- Joy Viado
- Iwi Nicolas
- Wowie de Guzman as Omar
- Chanda Romero as Rosing
- Ruel Vernal as Ernie
- John Regala†
- Cogie Domingo
- Carlo Muñoz
- Minnie Aguilar as Bless
- Cris Pineda
- Connie Chua
- Rosalinda Cheng
- John Lapus
- Richard Quan
- Steven Alonzo as Billy
- Michael Verrano as Mike Paragas
- Orestes Ojeda† as Mulong
- Hazel Ann Mendoza as Lally
- Patricia Ann Roque as Ning
- J.R. Herrera
- Vanessa De Blanco as Michelle
- Smokey Manaloto
- LJ Moreno-Alapag as Teresa
- Angelo Caangay
- Sunshine Cruz as Charlie
- Alwyn Uytingco
- Joseph Reyes
- Matthew Mendoza
- Alma Lerma
- Janice de Belen
- Monsour del Rosario
- Celine Lirio
- Benjie Valdez
- Roldan Aquino† as Mang Nonoy
- Alfred Manal
- Aljon Tolipas
- Marga Madrilejos
- Gina Pareño
- Jaime Fabregas
- Anna Larrucea as Clarissa
- Eva Darren
- Ray Ventura†
- Ronnie Lazaro as Mang Rene
- Nova Villa
- Spanky Manikan†
- Idda Yaneza
- Jeffrey Hidalgo
- Carla Guevara Laforteza as Honey
- Whitney Tyson as Yaya Bebang
- Niña de Sagun as Chinie
- Moreen Guese as Denise
- Vhong Navarro as Joseph
- Aljon Valdenebro
- Gabby Eigenmann as Raffy San Gabriel
- Boy 2 Quizon as Alvin
- Gloria Diaz
- Nicole Anderson
- Nida Blanca† as Mamu
- Kooch Mapua
- Chinggoy Alonzo as George
- Claudine Barretto
- Vilma Santos
- Gandong Cervantes as Mang Antonio
- Justeen Niebres
- Keempee de Leon as Martin "Jun" Dionisio, Jr.
- Eddie Gutierrez as Tony
- Nathalie Rheinhardt as Jewel
- Timmy Cruz
- Rex Agoncillo
- John Blair Sacce
- Angelo Muñoz
- Missy King
- Aurelio Esmino
- Glydel Mercado as Doris
- Nicole Allison Mendiola as Baby Gabbi
- CJ Jaravata
- Aiko Morales
- Maritoni Fernandez
- Ricardo Cepeda
- Bernardo Bernardo
- John Lloyd Cruz as Boyet
- Irma Adlawan
- Dennis Marasigan
- Ced Torrecarion
- Girlie Alcantara
- Alma Concepcion as Leila
- Malou de Guzman
- Troy Montero as Darwin
- Nikki Valdez
- Lei Atienza
- Aiza Marquez as Billie
- Hilda Koronel
- Dindo Arroyo as George
- Encar Benedicto
- Sylvia Sanchez as Menang
- Pen Medina as Mang Natoy
- Ces Quesada
- Nante Montreal
- Liza Lorena as Mameng
- Boboy Garrovillo as Oka
- Vernie Varga as Lolita
- Cholo Escano as Gab
- Izel Sarangelo
- Issa Fabregas as Yumi Ocampo
- Ian Veneracion as Siegfried "Tres"
- Peter Serrano as Ling
- Renato del Prado† as Mang Berto (tricycle driver)
- Mark Bryan Homecillo as Tom "Tomas" (Ikay's Boyfriend)
- Agot Isidro as Jackie
- Chris Garcia
- Lui Villaruz
- Khalil Kaimo as Eric
- Dennis Roldan as Doc Mendez
- Charlie Davao†
- Tommy Abuel as Dr. Silva
- Zoren Legaspi as Vince
- Winnie Cordero as Bebeng
- Carmina Villarroel
- John Apacible as Leon
- Migui Moreno
- Lloyd Zaragoza as Barry
- Mario Magallona
- Chris Manjares
- Ryan Ramos
- Vangie Labalan as Kapitana Libby
- Hannah Bustillos as Ria
- Neil Ryan Sese as Ador (Ria's father)
- Vivian Foz as Celia Guanzon
- Frances Makil-Ignacio
- Menggie Cobarrubias† as Julio Guanzon (Jamie's father)
- Raye Baquirin
- Marianne Savanno as Kelly
- Chris Manjares
- Jennifer Ranes
- Berting Labra†
- Aura Mijares
- Jenny Obrero
- Lance Castillo as Nathan
- Aiza Seguerra as Tammy Faye
- Sharon Cuneta
- Pops Fernandez
- Vina Morales
- Jolina Magdangal
- Empress Schuck as Rachel
- Margaux Montano
- Rachel Garrucho
- Richard Merck
- Nina Manalo
- Anita Linda† as Eva
- Nina Mercado
- Patricia Ismael
- Vicente Fabella as Buddy
- Lucy Quinto
- Chiqui Xerxes-Burgo
- Bella Flores† as Liway
- Nanette Inventor
- Bernard Cardona as Alfred
- Dennis Padilla as Dr. Danny
- Liza Ranillo as Lolita
- Subas Herrero† as Lolo Gario
- Noel Trinidad
- Rachelle Garrucho as Josephine (A.K.A. Jo)
- Heart Evangelista as Missy (G-MIK Guest Encounter of Carol On Ang Munting Paraiso)
- Janna Victoria as Gemma
- Bea Alonzo as Esmeralda
- Tirso Cruz III
- Albert Martinez
- Giselle Sanchez
- Miguel Vera
- Ama Quiambao
- Richard Arellano
- Robert Arevalo†
- Cris Daluz†
- Bembol Roco
- Joel Torre
- Dexter Doria
- Tonton Gutierrez
- Odette Khan
- Lito Legaspi†
- Gabe Mercado

== See also ==
- List of programs aired by ABS-CBN
- List of ABS-CBN Studios original drama series
