= TAPE Inc. =

Defunct Philippine television production company

Television and Production Exponents Inc.
- Logo used from 1981 to 2025
- Trade name: TAPE Inc.
- Type: Private
- Industry: Entertainment
- Predecessor: Production Specialists, Inc. (1978–1980)
- Founded: Loyola Heights, Quezon City, Philippines; July 7, 1981; 45 years ago
- Founder: Romeo “Nonong” G. Jalosjos Sr.†; Antonio “Tony” P. Tuviera
- Defunct: November 24, 2025; 11 months ago
- Fate: Dissolved; most of the former assets and operations were acquired by and absorbed into APT Entertainment, with the pre-May 31, 2023 Eat Bulaga! libraries were acquired by TVJ Productions, and their contract with GMA replaced by that of the said network with ABS-CBN Studios' It's Showtime on April 6, 2024 in which later expanded, extended and merged into the content deals with AMBS' ALLTV2 on June 17, 2024; Some Agila content sold to ABS-CBN Studios
- Headquarters: Quezon City, Philippines
- Key people: Romeo “Nonong” G. Jalosjos Sr.† (Chairman); Romeo “Jon-Jon” M. Jalosjos Jr. (President & CEO); Antonio “Tony” P. Tuviera (Consultant); Seth Frederick “Bullet” P. Jalosjos (Treasurer & Spokesperson); Soraya Jalosjos (EVP for Talent Management & Administration); Zenaida Buenavista (Financial Adviser); Atty. Maggie Abraham-Garduque (Legal Counsel)
- Products: Television program

Television and Production Exponents, Incorporated (also known as TAPE, Inc. or simply TAPE) was a Philippine television production company. It was founded in 1981 by Romeo Jalosjos Sr. and Antonio "Tony" Tuviera.

After the last episode of Tahanang Pinakamasaya, the company laid off 130 of their employees. In line with a corporate restructuring, the company later announced plans for a return to TV and online production.

On November 24, 2025, it was reported to have permanently ceased its operations, with most of the former assets and operations were acquired by and folded into APT Entertainment, a company which also run by Tuviera, whereas the pre-May 31, 2023 Eat Bulaga! libraries were acquired by Tito Sotto, Vic Sotto and Joey de Leon's new company, TVJ Productions (a joint venture with MediaQuest). Agila content was then sold to ABS-CBN Studios.

== Shows produced by TAPE Inc. ==
Shows	Television network	Date	Note
Eat Bulaga!	RPN; ABS-CBN; GMA Network	July 7, 1981 – January 5, 2024	The longest-running noontime variety show produced by TAPE, Inc.; now produced by TVJ Productions and airing on TV5 (first known as E.A.T.) since July 1, 2023 (and later reverted to Eat Bulaga! since January 6, 2024)
Heredero	RPN	July 23, 1984 – September 4, 1987	The first series produced by TAPE, Inc.
Agila	RPN; ABS-CBN	September 7, 1987 – February 7, 1992	
Valiente	ABS-CBN; GMA Network	February 10, 1992 – September 12, 1997	The first action teledrama
Kadenang Kristal	GMA Network	July 31, 1995 – August 9, 1996	The first evening teledrama
Mia Gracia	GMA Network	August 12, 1996 – August 15, 1997	
Del Tierro	GMA Network	September 15, 1997 – May 14, 1999	
Rio Del Mar	GMA Network	February 15, 1999 – March 9, 2001	
Kirara, Ano ang Kulay ng Pag-ibig?	GMA Network	August 16, 1999 – November 2, 2001	The first morning teledrama
Korek na Korek ka Dyan	GMA Network	2001	first evening game show
Biglang Sibol, Bayang Impasibol	GMA Network	March 12, 2001 – January 25, 2002	The first comedy teledrama
Hawak Ko ang Langit	GMA Network	July 14 – November 7, 2003	
Walang Hanggan	GMA Network	November 10, 2003 – February 27, 2004	
Ikaw sa Puso Ko	GMA Network	March 1 – October 15, 2004	
Leya, ang Pinakamagandang Babae sa Ilalim ng Lupa	GMA Network	October 18, 2004 – January 28, 2005	The first fantasy teledrama
Saang Sulok ng Langit	GMA Network	January 31 – August 12, 2005	
Let's Get Aww!!!	QTV (now GTV)	November 12, 2005 – 2006	
Kung Mamahalin Mo Lang Ako	GMA Network	August 15, 2005 – February 17, 2006	
Agawin Mo Man ang Lahat	GMA Network	February 20 – August 11, 2006	
Pinakamamahal	GMA Network	August 14 – November 3, 2006	
Makita Ka Lang Muli	GMA Network	November 6, 2006 – February 16, 2007	
Eat Na Ta!	GMA Cebu	November 12, 2007 – 2008	TAPE, Inc.'s regional variety show
Diz Iz It!	GMA Network	February 8 – July 24, 2010	
Valiente	TV5	February 13 – June 29, 2012	
Eat Bulaga! Indonesia	SCTV	July 16, 2012 – April 3, 2014	TAPE, Inc.'s first overseas variety show
The Ryzza Mae Show	GMA Network	April 8, 2013 – September 18, 2015	
The New Eat Bulaga! Indonesia	ANTV	November 17, 2014 – August 8, 2016; January 30 – February 17, 2023	TAPE, Inc.'s second overseas variety show
Kalyeserye	GMA Network	July 16, 2015 – December 17, 2016	
Princess in the Palace	GMA Network	September 21, 2015 – June 10, 2016	
Calle Siete	GMA Network	June 13 – October 21, 2016	
Trops	GMA Network	October 24, 2016 – September 22, 2017	Youth oriented teledrama
The Lolas' Beautiful Show	GMA Network	September 25, 2017 – February 2, 2018	
Tahanang Pinakamasaya	GMA Network	January 6 – March 2, 2024	The shortest-running noontime variety show produced by TAPE, Inc.

== Co-productions ==
Shows	Date	Production company	Television network	Note
Coney Reyes on Camera	May 19, 1984 – December 26, 1998	CAN Television	RPN; ABS-CBN	
Okay Ka, Fairy Ko!	November 26, 1987 – April 3, 1997	M-Zet Productions	IBC; ABS-CBN; GMA Network	
1 for 3	April 10, 1997 – July 5, 2001	M-Zet Productions	GMA Network	
Daddy Di Do Du	July 12, 2001 – July 29, 2007	M-Zet Productions	GMA Network	
Daisy Siete	September 1, 2003 – July 2, 2010	formerly co-produced with FOCUS E Inc.	GMA Network	only in Season 1
Ful Haus	August 5, 2007 – August 16, 2009	M-Zet Productions	GMA Network	
Del Monte Kitchenomics	1989 – 2015	Del Monte Foods	ABS-CBN; GMA Network; GMA News TV	
Little Star	October 25, 2010 – February 11, 2011	GMA Entertainment Group	GMA Network	

== TV specials ==
- Eat Bulaga 10th Anniversary Special (1989)
- Eat Bulaga 15th Anniversary Special (1994)
- Eat Bulaga 20th Anniversary Special (1999)
- Eat Bulaga! Silver Special (2004)
- Eat Bulaga 30th Anniversary Special (2009)
- A Party for Every Juan: The Jose and Wally Concert (2012)
- Jose and Wally Concert: A Party For Juan and All (2013)
- Eat Bulaga 35th Anniversary Special (2014)
- Sa Tamang Panahon (2015)
- Imagine You and Me: The Journey (2016)
- Miss Millennial Philippines Grand Coronation Day Special at the MOA Arena (2017)
- Love Is... (2017)
- Pamana (2018)
- Eat Bulaga 40th Anniversary Special (2019)

== Controversies ==
=== TAPE vs TVJ ===
On May 31, 2023, several hosts of Eat Bulaga!, namely Tito Sotto, Vic Sotto, Joey de Leon, and other core EB hosts filed their resignations due to disputes about the show's production and creative. On June 2, 2023, TVJ filed a petition for the cancellation of the trademark renewal filed by TAPE, Inc. on the Eat Bulaga!'s trademarks and anything connected to it. The renewal was cancelled on December 5, 2023, upon the Intellectual Property Office of the Philippines (IPOPHL) decision, forcing TAPE, Inc. to stop using Eat Bulaga!'s trademarks and anything connected to it.

On June 30, 2023, TVJ through their legal representatives, filed a copyright infringement and unfair competition charges against TAPE, Inc. for using Joey de Leon's intellectual property (which is Eat Bulaga! and all connected to the name) in Marikina Regional Trial Court. The case went on to the TVJ's favor on January 6, 2024, ordering the cease and desist order on both TAPE, Inc. and GMA Network to stop airing anything that is connected to the Eat Bulaga! trademark. The case was put into Court of Appeals, but eventually rejected.

=== Lawsuit by GMA Network ===
On May 22, 2025, GMA Network filed a complaint against the executives of TAPE Inc. for alleged misappropriation of funds. The case was because of the diversion of supposedly payments to GMA to "improve" their product. Several attempts at mediation failed resulting in the case subsequently proceeding, but was later dismissed by the Quezon City's Office of the City Prosecutor on October 20th.

== See also ==
- List of programs previously broadcast by Radio Philippines Network
- List of programs broadcast by ABS-CBN
- List of ABS-CBN original drama series
- List of GMA Network original programming
- List of GMA Network original drama series
