= Valiente (1992 TV series) =

Philippine television drama series

- Title card
- Also known as: Brave
- Genre: Action drama
- Written by: Gina Marissa Tagasa
- Directed by: Herman Escueta; Jose Rowel Icamen
- Starring: Michael de Mesa; Tirso Cruz III
- Opening theme: "Valiente" by Vic Sotto
- Country of origin: Philippines
- Original language: Tagalog

Production
- Executive producer: Grace Castro-Esquillon
- Producer: Antonio Tuviera
- Camera setup: Multiple-camera setup
- Running time: 30 minutes
- Production company: TAPE Inc.

Original release
- Network: ABS-CBN (1992–95); GMA Network (1995–97)
- Release: February 10, 1992 – September 12, 1997

Related
- Valiente (2012)

Valiente (trans. / international title: Brave) is a Philippine television drama action series broadcast by ABS-CBN and GMA Network. Directed by Herman Escueta and Jose Rowel Icamen, it stars Michael de Mesa and Tirso Cruz III. It premiered on February 10, 1992 on ABS-CBN and aired its final episode on the network on January 27, 1995. The series premiered on GMA Network on January 30, 1995. The series concluded on September 12, 1997.

A remake aired in 2012.

== Cast and characters ==
Lead cast

- Michael de Mesa as Gardo Valiente
- Tirso Cruz III as Theo Braganza

Supporting cast

- Glenda Garcia as Leona Braganza
- Mariz Ricketts as Maila Braganza-Valiente
- Odette Khan as Trinidad "Trini" Braganza
- Jean Garcia as Elaine Velasquez-Braganza
- Ruben Rustia as Damian Valiente
- Renato del Prado as Pepito "Peping" Ramirez
- Aris Cuevas as Badong
- Jose Manalo as Elias
- Nante Montreal as Camillo
- Miguel Rodriguez
- Marissa Sanchez as Vivian
- Val Victa as Fidel Dioquino
- Eugene Domingo as Dolores
- Alma Lerma as Adeling
- Marlon Mance as Dino
- Lucita Soriano as Nena
- Richard Arellano as Crisanto
- Simon Serrano as Bugoy
- Rustom Padilla as Albert Rosales
- Liza Ranillo as Cita
- Jeniffer Mendoza as Celia
- Patricia Ann Roque as Lea / Melissa B. Valiente
- Karina "Kara" Cruz as Chona
- John Arcilla as Froilan / Benjie
- Robert Arevalo as Cenon
- Maggie Dela Riva
- Tet Antiquiera
- Rochelle Barrameda
- Romy Mallari as Lea's father
- Jean Saburit as Lea's mother
- Matutina
- Berting Labra
- Beverly Javaluyas

Guest cast

- Sunshine Cruz as younger Leona
- Atong Redillas as younger Theo

== Accolades ==
Accolades received by Valiente
| Year | Award | Category | Recipient | Result | Ref. |
|---|---|---|---|---|---|
| 1996 | 10th PMPC Star Awards for Television | Best Drama Series | Valiente | Won | |
