= Oyo Boy Sotto =

Filipino actor

- Born: Vittorio Mari Bonnevie Sotto; January 12, 1984 (age 42); Manila, Philippines
- Occupation: Actor
- Years active: 1987–present
- Agents: APT Entertainment; Sparkle GMA Artist Center; (2001–07; 2013–present); Talent5; (2008–13); Star Magic; (2007–10)
- Spouse: Kristine Hermosa (m. 2011)
- Children: 6
- Parents: Vic Sotto (father); Dina Bonnevie (mother)
- Relatives: Vico Sotto (half-brother); Tito Sotto (uncle); Val Sotto (uncle); Marc Pingris (brother-in-law); Gian Sotto (cousin); Ciara Sotto (cousin); Miko Sotto (cousin)

Vittorio Mari Bonnevie Sotto (Tagalog pronunciation: [ˌbɔnɛˈbi ˈsɔtɔ]; born January 12, 1984), known professionally as Oyo Boy Sotto, is a Filipino actor. He is the son of Filipino actor-comedian-host Vic Sotto and Swiss-Filipino singer-actress Dina Bonnevie, nephew of Senator Tito Sotto, younger brother of actress Danica Sotto, half-brother of Pasig City Mayor Vico Sotto and the cousin of Gian Sotto, Ciara Sotto, and the late Miko Sotto.

== Personal life ==
At the age of 3, in 1988, Sotto joined the fantasy situational comedy Okay Ka, Fairy Ko! and the weekly anthologies Lovingly Yours, Helen and Coney Reyes on Camera. At the age of 9, he also joined GMA Telecine Specials in 1993. At age 19, Sotto signed his contract under GMA Artist Center (now Sparkle GMA Artist Center) as he joined the cast of Love to Love: Rich in Love and several drama series of GMA Network from 2003 to 2007. Also in 2007, he transferred to ABS-CBN when he signed a Star Magic contract until 2010 lasted for 3 years. In 2013, Sotto went back to GMA Network after 6 years where he joined the cast of Vampire ang Daddy Ko. On January 12, 2011, he married actress Kristine Hermosa. Their children are Kristian Daniel (Kiel, born August 16, 2008) and the other is their biological daughter, Ondrea Bliss (born December 26, 2011), and three biological sons Kaleb Hanns (born October 11, 2014), Marvic Valentin II (Vin, born November 5, 2016), and Vittorio Isaac (born August 4, 2021). He is a born-again Christian and attending Victory. Hermosa announced per Instagram post in February 2024 that she was pregnant with her sixth child with Sotto.

== Filmography ==
=== Film ===
Year	Title	Role
1990	Crocodile Jones Son of Indiana Dundee	Young Crocodile Jones
2003	Lastikman	Young Hilario
2003	Pakners	Peejee
2004	Kuya	Ferdie
2004	Forever My Love	Troy
2004	Enteng Kabisote: Okay ka, Fairy Ko: The Legend	Benok Kabisote
2005	Enteng Kabisote 2: Okay Ka Fairy Ko: The Legend Continues	Benok Kabisote
2006	TxT	Roman
2006	Enteng Kabisote 3 : Okay ka, Fairy Ko: The Legend Goes On and On and On	Benok Kabisote
2007	Enteng Kabisote 4: Okay Ka, Fairy Ko: The Beginning of the Legend	Benok Kabisote
2008	Iskul Bukol: 20 Years After	Yoyo Ungasis
2009	Ang Darling Kong Aswang	Police Midnight DJ
2010	Si Agimat at Si Enteng Kabisote	Benok Kabisote
2011	Enteng ng Ina Mo	Benok Kabisote
2012	Si Agimat, si Enteng Kabisote at si Ako	Benok Kabisote
2013	My Little Bossings	Agent Kobe (NBA)
2015	My Bebe Love: #Kilig Pa More	NBI Agent
2016	Enteng Kabisote 10 and the Abangers	Benok Kabisote

=== Television ===
Year	Title	Role
1987	Okay Ka, Fairy Ko!	Benok Kabisote
1987	Lovingly Yours	Oyo
1988	Coney Reyes on Camera	Various
1993	GMA Telecine Specials	Various
2003	Love to Love: Rich in Love	Richmond
2003–2004	Walang Hanggan	Basti
2004	Ikaw sa Puso Ko	Anton
2004	Leya, ang Pinakamagandang Babae sa Ilalim ng Lupa	Emman
2005	Saang Sulok ng Langit	Marky
2005–2006	Kung Mamahalin Mo Lang Ako	Segismundo "Sig" Larriza
2006	Agawin Mo Man ang Lahat	Nicolas "Nick" Valverde
2006	Majika	Jamir
2006	Pinakamamahal	Martin Padua
2006	Ang Mahiwagang Baul: Alamat ng Bahaghari	Anino
2006–2007	Makita Ka Lang Muli	Roy
2007	Your Song: Someone in the Dark	Aries
2007	Love Spell: Sweet Sixty	Bong/Rogelio
2007	Komiks: Pedro Penduko at ang mga Engkantao	Josef
2007	Sineserye Presents: May Minamahal	Carlitos Tagle
2007	Maalaala Mo Kaya: Toga	Roy
2008	Prinsesa ng Banyera	Victor Abad
2008–2011	Midnight DJ	Samboy dela Cruz
2010	Precious Hearts Romances Presents: Lumang Piso Para sa Puso	Dave Pangilinan
2011	Carlo J. Caparas' Bangis	Leon
2012	Valiente	Theo Braganza
2013–2016	Vampire ang Daddy Ko	Vlad
2015	Sabado Badoo	Cameo Footage Featured
2016	Dear Uge	
2016–2017	Hay, Bahay!	Yoyo
2017–2018	Bossing & Ai	Himself/co-host
2018–2023	Daddy's Gurl	Lance Saavedra

==== Voice actor animation ====
Year	Title	Role	Notes	Source
2012	Ben 10: Destroy All Aliens	Retaliator Armor	Filipino dub	
