= Orly Punzalan =

Filipino broadcaster (1940–2005)

- Born: Orly J. Punzalan; September 9, 1935; Apalit, Pampanga, Philippine Islands
- Died: January 6, 2005 (aged 69); Manila, Philippines
- Occupations: TV and radio
- Years active: 1967–2005
- Spouse: Helen Vela (m. 1967; div. 1973)
- Children: 4 (incl. Princess)
- Relatives: Karen Punzalan (granddaughter)

Orly J. Punzalan (September 9, 1935 – January 6, 2005) was a Filipino radio-TV personality in the Philippines.

== Personal life ==
In 1967, he was married to actress and broadcaster, Helen Vela (1946–1992). They had four children, including Pastor Paolo Punzalan (Senior Pastor of Victory Fort Bonifacio) and Princess Punzalan. The couple separated in 1973 and later divorced. He later married a woman named Pilar.

== Career ==
Punzalan was once the station manager of Radio Veritas. He also hosted a program called Touching Lives in the same station. The broadcaster was also once the president of the Intercontinental Broadcasting Corporation from 1987 to 1989. Punzalan is considered as one of the veterans in Philippine communication arts and acted as a consultant for several radio and television stations.

In February 2000, he received the EDSA People Power Freedom Award.

In his later years, Punzalan taught broadcasting in institutions such as the Colegio de San Juan de Letran and the University of Perpetual Help-Rizal.

== Death ==
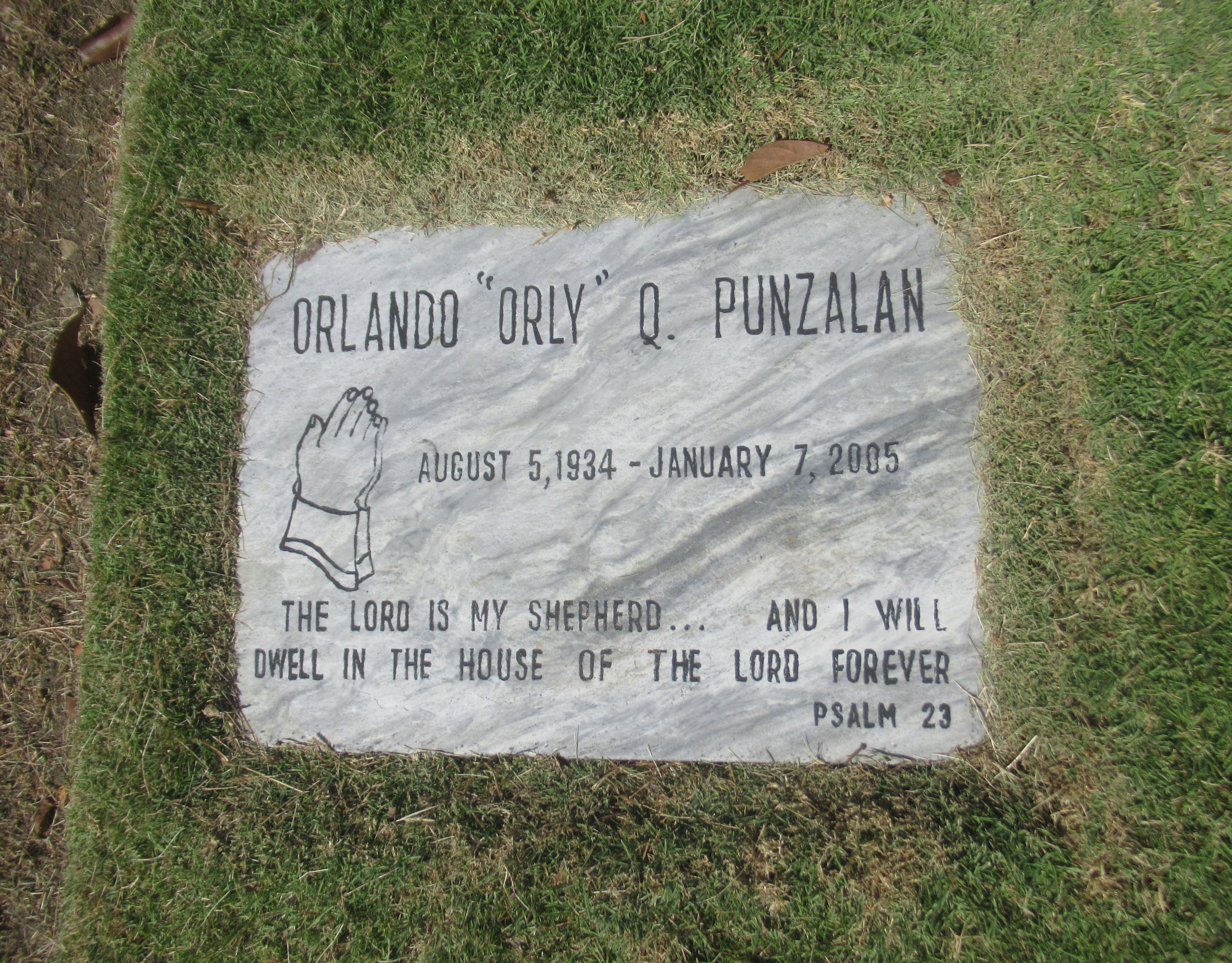
Punzalan's grave at Manila Memorial Park – Sucat.

He died of cardiac arrest on January 6, 2005, at the National Kidney and Transplant Institute in Quezon City. He was 70. He was buried at the Manila Memorial Park in Parañaque next to his wife Helen Vela (who died in 1992).
