= Agila (TV series) =

1987–92 Philippine television drama series

- Also known as: Eagle
- Genre: Drama
- Created by: TAPE Inc.
- Directed by: Herman Escueta
- Starring: Val Sotto; Delia Razon; Helen Vela
- Country of origin: Philippines
- Original language: Filipino

Production
- Production location: Philippines
- Running time: 30 minutes
- Production company: TAPE Inc.

Original release
- Network: RPN (1987–1989); ABS-CBN (1989–1992)
- Release: September 7, 1987 – February 7, 1992

Agila (International title: Eagle) was a Philippine television drama series produced by TAPE Inc. and broadcast by RPN and ABS-CBN. Directed by Herman Escueta, it starred Val Sotto, Delia Razon, and Helen Vela. It aired from September 7, 1987 to February 7, 1992, replacing Heredero and was replaced by Valiente.

== Cast ==
- Val Sotto as Don Gabriel Agila
- Delia Razon† as Doña Maura Morena
- Helen Vela† as Ester Morena
- Laarni Enriquez as Olivia (in the first-part)
  - Vivian Foz as Olivia (in the second-part to the end)
- Aurora Sevilla as Liweng
- Keempee de Leon as Bobet M. Agila – the eldest son of Gabriel & Ester
- Jeffrey Sison
- Rosalinda Olivarez as Minyang
- Lawrence Olivarez as boy hapon
- RR Herrera as Jun-jun – the son of Gabriel & Liweng
- Arabelle Cadocio as Nina – the daughter of Gabriel & Olivia
- Roger Aquino as Rod
- Ana Feliciano† as Mimosa
- Lito Legaspi†
- Yda Yaneza as Ludy
- Mely Tagasa† as Lola Belen
- Roy Alvarez† as Lauro
- Rey Sagum as Max
- Tom Olivar as Satur
- Sonny Parsons†
- Vanessa Escano as Teacher Agnes (in the second-part to the end)
- Toby Alejar

== Accolades ==
In 1988, Agila won the award for Best Afternoon Drama Series at the 2nd PMPC Star Awards for Television. In 1991, the series won the award for Best Drama Serial at the 5th PMPC Star Awards for Television.

== Broadcast history ==
It was broadcast and co-produced by RPN on September 7, 1987, as a replacement to another TAPE-produced drama Heredero. It is aired at 1:30 pm right after TV show Eat Bulaga!. When RPN, along with its sister company IBC, was sequestrated in 1989, Agila, with Eat Bulaga!, Coney Reyes on Camera from RPN and Okay Ka, Fairy Ko! from IBC, was moved to ABS-CBN on February 20 and it started to be co-produced and broadcast that year. It made its final episode on February 7, 1992, for four years.

From then on, Agila was sold by TAPE Inc's successors (APT Entertainment and TVJ Productions) to ABS-CBN Studios.

== See also ==
- List of programs broadcast by ABS-CBN
- List of programs previously broadcast by Radio Philippines Network
