= Miko Sotto =

Filipino actor (1982-2003)

- Born: Marcelino Antonio Carag Sotto III; May 10, 1982; Manila, Philippines
- Died: December 29, 2003 (aged 21); Mandaluyong, Philippines
- Resting place: Loyola Memorial Park, Parañaque
- Other name: Miko Sotto
- Occupations: Matinee idol, actor, teen star
- Years active: 2000–2003
- Parents: Marcelino Antonio "Maru" Sotto Jr.; Ali Carag-Sotto

Marcelino Antonio Carag Sotto III (May 10, 1982 – December 29, 2003), professionally known as Miko Sotto (Tagalog: [ˈmɪkɔ ˈsɔtɔ]), was a Filipino matinee idol, actor, and teen star, and son of singer/actress/radio commentator/TV host Ali Sotto.

== Early life and career ==
Sotto was born on May 10, 1982, in Manila. He is the son of Marcelino "Maru" Sotto Jr. and Ali Sotto. He was part of the prominent Sotto family in showbiz. He was a great-grandson of former Senator Vicente Y. Sotto, Sr. and the grandson and grandnephew of Marcelino Antonio "Nonong" O. Sotto, Sr. and Vicente O. Sotto, Jr., respectively. He was the nephew of Senate President Vicente "Tito" C. Sotto, III, Val Sotto and Vic Sotto. His granduncle Filemon Y. Sotto was also a former senator of the Philippines. Actors Oyo Boy Sotto, Ciara Sotto, and Gian Sotto were his cousins. As a talent of the GMA Artist Center, he became a TV fixture, with stints on GMA's youth-oriented programs Click and Kahit Kailan.

== Personal life and death ==
Sotto had been in a relationship with actress Angel Locsin for six months at the time of his death. He fell from the ninth floor of San Francisco Garden Plaza Condominium, a condominium building along Boni Avenue, Mandaluyong where he had been living for 4 years. According to initial investigation, Sotto was with his cousin Oyo Boy Sotto, two other friends, and a maid at the condominium. According to reports, a security guard saw Sotto seated at the railings of the balcony. Sotto was about to part with his friends and tried to get down from the railings when his foot allegedly got caught in a planter, causing him to lose his balance and fall from his balcony at 4:50 a.m. on December 29, 2003.

Sotto was immediately rushed to the nearby Mandaluyong City Medical Center where he was declared dead on arrival. "The patient died from multiple skull fracture", according to the male physician on duty at the hospital. From the Mandaluyong hospital, Sotto was brought to Makati Medical Center at 5:45 a.m., but doctors there were also unable to revive him. He was taken to the hospital's morgue at 8:05 a.m., the same day.

His funeral was held at the Arlington Funeral Homes in Quezon City. His remains were later interred at Loyola Memorial Park - Sucat in Parañaque on January 3, 2004.

His mother, Ali donated Miko's corneas to the Eye Bank of the Philippines at the time of his death. His mother met one of the recipients during one of the episodes of Eat Bulaga!.

== Filmography ==
=== Film ===
Year	Title	Role
2000	Bakit Ba Ganyan? (Ewan ko nga ba, Darling)	
2001	Bahay ni Lola	Buboy
2003	Fantastic Man (film version)	Reggie

=== Television ===
Year	Title	Role	Notes
2000–2002	Click	Joey	
2002	Kahit Kailan	Itos	
2002	Kung Mawawala Ka	Dindo	
2003	Walang Hanggan	Mike	Last TV Series Appearance
2003	SiS	Himself / Guest	A TV appearance together with his mother Ali Sotto
