= Princess Punzalan =

Filipino actress (born 1968)

- Born: Bernadette Vela Punzalan; November 20, 1968 (age 57); Manila, Philippines
- Occupation: Actress / Nurse
- Years active: 1984–present
- Known for: Mula sa Puso
- Spouses: Willie Revillame (m. 1990; ann. 1997) Jason Field (m. 2005)
- Children: 1
- Parent(s): Orly Punzalan (father; deceased); Helen Vela (mother; deceased)
- Relatives: Paolo Punzalan (brother); Meg Punzalan (sister); Reuben Hernandez (brother); Janina Vela Punzalan (niece)

Bernadette "Princess" Vela Punzalan-Field (born November 20, 1968) is a Filipino actress. She began her career starring in Lovingly Yours: The Movie (1984) and Lovingly Yours, Helen (1992-96) and was nominated of PMPC Star Awards for Television in 1987. Her profile continued to grow when she starred as antagonist Selina Pereira-Matias in Mula sa Puso (1997–99) with Claudine Barretto, and won Best Actress in 1998.

== Career ==
Princess Punzalan started out her career as one of the regular co-hosts in now defunct GMA Network Sunday noontime musical variety show GMA Supershow. Soon after she was launched in her own afternoon TV drama anthology entitled "Princess" in 1987 which was produced by her mom Helen Vela's production outfit Hyper Vision. To avoid a possible collision with RPN's Coney Reyes on Camera (headline by her mom's best friend Coney), her drama anthology was aired at a later timeslot.

While her TV career began to be successful, she also branched out into making films. She made her mark in the film Kung Tapos Na ang Kailanman (shown in 1990) which gave her a FAMAS nomination for Best Actress.

In 1989, her drama series was cancelled to make way for Family 3+1, a sitcom which she headlined with her mother Helen Vela and also starred Ronaldo Valdez and Caridad Sanchez. The show made waves and even received 2 awards for Best Comedy Show at Star Awards. But with the untimely death of its main star Helen Vela caused the show to gradually decline until it was cancelled. Soon after, Princess filled in the void left by her mother (as producer-host/actress) in the drama anthology Lovingly Yours, Helen which was renamed Lovingly Yours. The reformatted drama anthology survived for four more years until it was ended by the GMA management in 1996.

She became popular for her role as antagonist Selina Pereira-Matias in the 1997 hit TV series Mula sa Puso starring Claudine Barretto, aired on ABS-CBN.

In the later 2000s, she transferred back to GMA and did supporting/main roles. One of her last TV series as a series regular was Kung Mawawala Ka a political drama on primetime airing on GMA Network which garnered attention at the time of its back to back battle with the drama series Pangako Sa 'Yo.

She returned to film as co-teacher and Mila's best friend in Mila played by Maricel Soriano.

In 2005, she played the evil aunt of Ryza Cenon and LJ Reyes in GMA Network's afternoon drama series and Now and Forever first installment series Mukha and then moved back to ABS-CBN though was only visible on Maalaala Mo Kaya. She appeared in The Last Prince (2010) starring Aljur Abrenica and Kris Bernal, where Punzalan played an evil witch named Alwana.

She returned to ABS-CBN in 2015 after five years with GMA-7.

She appeared in the GMA Films and Regal Films movie My Valentine Girls with Richard Gutierrez. She did a film Johnny Loves Dolores (2012), an entry in the San Francisco International Asian Film Festival, directed by Clarissa delos Reyes.

Punzalan is now based in the United States, fulfilling her duties as a registered nurse.

== Personal life ==
The daughter of Orly Punzalan (a broadcaster who was formerly the president of IBC) and actress/host Helen Vela (now both deceased), her siblings are Meg, Reuben, and Paolo (senior pastor of Victory Fort Bonifacio). A niece is a model and YouTube vlogger Janina Vela Punzalan.

Punzalan was previously married to controversial TV host and actor Willie Revillame. She later settled in California in 2005 after marrying Jason Field, an American marketing professional. The couple has a daughter.

== Filmography ==
=== Film ===
Year	Title	Role	Notes	Source
1984	Lovingly Yours: The Movie	Candy's friend	Segment: "Candy", Credited as "Princess"	
1987	Kamandag ni Kris			
1987	Tubusin Mo ng Dugo			
1987	Pasan Ko ang Daigdig	Luming		
1988	Silang Mga Sisiw sa Lansangan			
1988	Tubusin Mo ng Dugo... A Crime Story			
1988	Alega Gang: Public Enemy No.1 of Cebu	Ulysses' sister		
1988	Magkano ang Iyong Dangal?	Alma		
1989	Macho Dancer	Pining		
1990	Kung Tapos Na Ang Kailanman			
1990	Tayo Na sa Dilim			
1997	Kahit sa Bala Kakapit Ako			
1997	Duterte: Ang Berdugong Alkalde ng Davao			
1997	Ibulong Mo sa Diyos 2			
1997	Haba-Baba-Doo! Puti-Puti-Poo!	Madonna		
1998	Dahil Mahal na Mahal Kita	School Dean	Cameo	
1999	Mula sa Puso: The Movie	Selina Matias		
1999	Pepeng Agimat			
2001	Mila	Linda		
2003	Alab Ng Lahi			
2011	My Valentine Girls	Cion	Segment: "Soulmates"	
2012	Johnny Loves Dolores	Dolores		
2019	Yellow Rose	Priscilla Garcia		
2022	The Gift	Rosa	2022 HBO APA Visionaries Award; Short film	

=== Television ===
Year	Title	Role	Notes	Source
1992–96	Lovingly Yours, Helen	Herself - Host / Various roles		
1997–99	Mula sa Puso	Selina Pereira-Matias		
1999	Maalaala Mo Kaya	Aeta's mother	Episode: "Tala Sa Lahar"	
1999–2000	Labs Ko Si Babe	Guadalupe "Lupe" Mabuenas-Angeles		
2000	Maalaala Mo Kaya		Episode: "Pen Pal"	
2001	Biglang Sibol, Bayang Impasibol	Elaine		
2002–03	Kung Mawawala Ka	Ernestina Montemayor		
2003	Narito ang Puso Ko	Atty. Salgado		
2004	Te Amo, Maging Sino Ka Man	Amanda Camacho		
2004–05	Mulawin	Maningning		
2005	Now and Forever: Mukha	Dulce		
2006	Magpakailanman	Nene	Episode: "Larawan ng katapatan sa mata ng isang musmos: The Cristina "Tinay" Bugayong Story"	
2007	Maalaala Mo Kaya	Josie	Episode: "Sigarilyo"	
2009	Maalaala Mo Kaya	Ester	Episode: "Letters"	
2010	The Last Prince	Diwani Alwana	Special Participation	
2015	Yagit	Atty. Mildred "Millie" Prado		
2015	Magpakailanman	Piling	Episode: "Sa Ngalan ng pagmamahal: The Alex Bernardo Story"	
2016	Maalaala Mo Kaya	Hulma	Episode: "Hijab"	
2016	The Story of Us	Clodette Lowery		
2017	The Promise of Forever	Marcela dela Paz		
2022–2024	The Cleaning Lady	Alma De La Rosa "Lola"		
2026	Nurse the Dead	Camille Alejandro		

== Awards and nominations ==
Year	Work	Ceremony	Award	Result	Source
1987	Lovingly Yours, Helen	PMPC Star Awards for Television	Best New TV Personality	Won	
1988	Magkano ang Iyong Dangal?	Metro Manila Film Festival	Best Supporting Actress	Nominated	
1998	Mula sa Puso	PMPC Star Awards for Television	Best Drama Actress	Won	

== See also ==
- Eula Valdez
- Kate Valdez
- Star Drama Presents
