= Biglang Sibol, Bayang Impasibol =

Philippine television drama series

- Title card
- Genre: Comedy drama
- Written by: Abner Tulagan; Joseph Balboa
- Directed by: Jeffrey Jeturian
- Starring: Celia Rodriguez; Nestor de Villa; Sylvia La Torre
- Theme music composer: Joey de Leon
- Opening theme: "Biglang Sibol" by Vic Sotto
- Country of origin: Philippines
- Original language: Tagalog
- No. of episodes: 228

Production
- Executive producers: Antonio P. Tuviera; Malou Choa-Fagar
- Producer: Antonio P. Tuviera
- Camera setup: Multiple-camera setup
- Running time: 30 minutes
- Production company: TAPE Inc.

Original release
- Network: GMA Network
- Release: March 12, 2001 – January 25, 2002

Biglang Sibol, Bayang Impasibol (transl. sudden sprout, town impossible) is a Philippine television drama comedy series broadcast by GMA Network. Directed by Jeffrey Jeturian, it stars Celia Rodriguez, Nestor de Villa and Sylvia La Torre. It premiered on March 12, 2001. The series concluded on January 25, 2002, with a total of 228 episodes.

== Cast and characters ==
Lead cast

- Celia Rodriguez as Nena
- Nestor de Villa as Noel
- Sylvia La Torre

Supporting cast

- Delia Razon as Luding
- Michael de Mesa as Tonito
- Princess Punzalan
- Gardo Versoza as Carlos Herrero
- Jeffrey Quizon as Epoy
- Lara Fabregas
- Lyka Ugarte
- Lara Morena
- Ynez Veneracion
- Russel Jake Bauan as Dennis Rodman
- Alessandra De Rossi as Angela
- Gladys Guevarra as Medusa
- Carmina Manzano
- Dindin Llarena as Deedee
- Steven Claude Goyong
- Wendy Laguidao Hunter
