= Valiente (2012 TV series) =

- Genre: Drama
- Created by: Archangel Productions; TAPE Inc.
- Based on: Valiente (1992)
- Developed by: Gina Marissa Tagasa
- Written by: Phil M. Noble; Ma. Zita S. Garganera; Liza Magtoto; Abner Tulagan; Joel Saracho
- Directed by: Joel Lamangan
- Starring: JC de Vera; Oyo Boy Sotto; Niña Jose; Nadine Samonte; Jaclyn Jose; Michael de Mesa; John Regala
- Theme music composer: Vic Sotto (music); Gina Marissa Tagasa (lyrics)
- Opening theme: "Valiente" by Vic Sotto
- Country of origin: Philippines
- Original language: Filipino
- No. of episodes: 98

Production
- Executive producer: Annabelle T. Macauba
- Producer: Jojo Oconer
- Production location: Batangas City
- Editor: Roy Diomampo
- Running time: 30-45 minutes
- Production company: TAPE Inc.

Original release
- Network: TV5
- Release: February 13 – June 29, 2012

Valiente (International title: Brave) is a 2012 Philippine television drama action series broadcast by TV5. The series is a remake of the 1992 Philippine television series of the same title. Directed by Joel Lamangan, it stars JC de Vera, Oyo Boy Sotto, Niña Jose, Nadine Samonte, Jaclyn Jose, Michael de Mesa and John Regala. It aired from February 13 to June 29, 2012, replacing Glamorosa.

Valiente recounts the epic tale of two families whose lives are intertwined by their desire to claim what they believe is rightfully theirs. Gardo and Theo from the two conflicting families of Valiente and Braganza; are two men who used to be best of friends but came to be mortal enemies brought by the ambitious Donya Trining and how will she use her wealth and power in manipulating the life of Gardo Valiente, the real Braganza.

Valiente's official poster on its 2nd chapter.

== Overview ==
=== Adaptation ===
Valiente is the original 5-year classic and epic drama written by Gina Marissa Tagasa. From the original concept of Antonio Tuviera, the series were top-billed by Tirso Cruz III, Michael de Mesa, Glenda Garcia and Mariz Ricketts. It was originally produced by TAPE Inc. and aired on two stations: ABS-CBN (1992–1995) and GMA Network (1995–1997).

== Plot ==
The soap's story centered on best friends: Don Armando Braganza and Damian Valiente, most especially their sons, Theo Braganza and Gardo Valiente, whose lives are opposite from each other. Theo was born rich, a playboy and was groomed as heir to Hacienda Braganza. Gardo on the other hand, was born poor, God-fearing and was poised to take over his father Damian as one of Hacienda Braganza's workers. Despite their differences, Gardo and Theo treated each other like brothers until the death of Don Armando which caused conflict in the hacienda when Donya Trinidad took over the ownership, as well as the accidental killing of Theo to Luming Valiente. The conflict worse as an uprising occurred in the hacienda which caused the imprisonment of Damian. After which, Gardo falls for Theo's youngest sister, Maila. Their relationship was doomed from the start as Theo never liked Maila for Gardo as he preferred her other sister Leona to fall for his friend.

Leona confessed to Gardo the crime her brother made. Theo had accidentally shot Luming Valiente while playing his father's gun a long time ago. Donya Trining concealed this incident by blaming it on rebels. Gardo after finding out of this incident later on planned to retaliate to Theo. He used the rebel's power to threaten the Braganzas. To fix this problem, Donya Trining agreed to imprison Theo but in exchange Gardo will marry Leona. On the day of their marriage, Gardo took his place to reveal Theo's crime in front of prominent persons and mediamen. Because of this incident, Leona lose her consciousness that made her to be placed in a mental hospital, where they discovered that Leona's pregnancy was brought by an anonymous man who raped her.

Theo became very sad on what happened to his family. His sadness let him to comfort his self on a bar where he met Vivian. Vivian knowing on newspaper that her customer is a prominent person placed herself off from Theo even though it did gives love to her. She also advised Theo to come home and face his problems. Theo, knowing Leona's situation, became very mad to Gardo. This let him attempt to kill Gardo one night after burning its face on a fire. Don Luis saw Gardo left bloodied on his way to Rancho Regalado. On the other hand, The Braganzas are in need to supplement their company's near bankruptcy. Donya Trining seeing Vincent Lee, a Chinese businessman that invests a lot in Bahay Pangarap look for him and asked for help. She let her son Theo to be married to Vincent Lee's daughter Elaine to support their company's financial problem. Maila left sorrowful on Gardo's false death. Joel Gatchalian, Theo's friend took this incident to have Maila's love. The situation made Maila to answer yes to Joel's marriage proposal.

Damian and Donya Trining on Leona's burial.

Gardo, was left scarred by the tragedy and the betrayal his best friend done to him. Don Luis, pursued him to take his revenge to the Braganzas. Gardo changed his name as Nicolas Vallejo and studied a lot all about business. He even became one of the top amateurs in the corporate world. On the other hand, the ambitious Donya Trining decided to run for mayor of San Rafael. Vincent hearing this supported Donya Trining for him to have the political power on his side for his businesses. He gave up a lot of money for Donya Trining's election campaign. Miguel Magno, Donya Trining's opponent for being mayor took Damian as his adviser and his campaign manager. As his financial support, Miguel took Don Luis. At the end, Donya Trining became the new elected Mayor of San Rafael replacing Mayor Manding. Donya Trining commanded Peping to kill Damian but accidentally the gunshot went to Don Luis. Later they accused Damian for doing this. Damian went to his niece, Vivian to hide from Trining's power. Vincent on the other hand, requests Mayor Trining for her debts to pay it to him immediately. The greedy Mayor Trining in exchange gave him his death. She commanded Peping to kill Vincent. Mayor Trining commanded the whole San Rafael to find Damian with a 2 million pesos in exchange. However, the evidences points Mayor Trining as the primary suspect and this turned out as Nicolas good luck. Mayor Trining asked for Nicolas help to hide her from her crimes. Nicolas helped her with one condition, that is to give him the Villa Braganza's lot title. Mayor Trining with no doubt did what Nicolas said.

== Cast and characters ==
=== Main cast ===
- JC de Vera as Gardo Soledad Valiente / Nicolas Vallejo / Gardo Soledad Braganza
- Oyo Boy Sotto as Theo Braganza / Theo Ramirez
- Niña Jose as Leona Braganza
- Nadine Samonte as Maila Braganza / Maila Regalado Ilagan-Valiente
- Jaclyn Jose as Doña "Trining" Trinidad De los Reyes-Braganza
- Michael de Mesa as Damian Valiente
- John Regala as Peping Ramirez

=== Supporting cast ===
- Mark Gil as Don Armando Braganza
- Gina Alajar as Iluminada "Luming" Soledad-Valiente
- Tony Mabesa as Victorino Penitente
- Jaime Pebanco as Ariston Bugayon
- Racquel Villavicencio as Doña Corazon Braganza
- Meg Imperial as Jody
- Sunshine Garcia as Vivian
- Joel Saracho as Attorney Manalad
- Nicco Manalo as Ricky
- Erika Padilla as Tess
- Andrew Schimmer as Dexter
- Jhiz Deocareza as Jaden
- Maria Cristina "Kite" Lopez as Pinang

=== Extended cast ===
- Lorna Tolentino as Mila Regalado-Arden
- Roxanne Guinoo as Elaine Lee-Braganza
- Odette Khan as Minerva Magbanua
- James Blanco as Joel Gatchalian
- Allan Paule as Simon
- Crispin Pineda as Javier
- Frances Makil-Ignacio as Martha
- Toby Alejar as Vincent
- Ramon Gutierrez as Miguel

=== Special guest ===
- Tirso Cruz III as Don Luis Regalado
- Mariz Ricketts as Dr. Lourdes Asuncion

=== Cameo appearance ===
- Czarina Suzara as young Leona
- Lianne Valentine as young Maila
- Ross Fernando as young Gardo
- Arvic Rivero as young Theo
- Cogie Domingo as young Armando
- Biboy Ramirez as young Damian
- Ciara Sotto as young Luming
- Kathleen Hermosa as young Trining
- Jay Aquitania as young Ariston
- Mico Aytona as young Simon
- Alwyn Uytingco as young Javier
- Joross Gamboa as young Don Luis

=== Other cast ===
- Joe Gruta as Ka Narding
- Mike Magat
- Dinkydoo Clarion
- Kimo Paez
- Billy James Renacta
- Arjon Lozada
- Jose Mari Ora
- Jobert Luzares
- Edwin Reyes as Police Chief
- Miguel Moreno as Doc Jake
- Dang Cruz as Ilyang
- Jessa Mae Bonguyan as Reine
- Menggie Cobarrubias as Mayor Manding
- James David Forda as Kent
- Lui Manansala as Atty. Dela Rosa
- Cara Michel Briquel as Marga
- Erwin Tulfo as Reporter
- Kerbie Zamora as Matthew
- Jett Alcantara as Ka Solomon
- Jerald Napoles as Domeng
- Robert Correa as a Bodyguard
- Kirby Cristobal as a Policemen
- Marc Vito as Angelo

== Production ==
The main cast of the series was revealed in its story conference held last November 7, 2011. The series is directed by the multi-awarded and highly acclaimed director, Joel Lamangan fresh from GMA Network's Pahiram ng Isang Ina. The show was written by Phil M. Noble the one who write TV5 Drama's Nandito Ako and Isang Dakot na Luha. The show was developed by the highly acclaimed writer, Gina Marissa Tagasa way back 1992 from its original telecast. The series brings back its original protagonist, Michael de Mesa to play Damian Valiente, exactly two decades from the date it originally aired on ABS-CBN.

Oyo Sotto and Nadine Samonte once worked as love team on GMA Network's telefantasya, Leya, ang Pinakamagandang Babae sa Ilalim ng Lupa and now working as siblings in the series. This was the first major project for Niña Jose on TV5 after transferring from ABS-CBN.

Jaclyn Jose was added to the cast after the rejection of Ms. Amalia Fuentes to the role, Donya Trining Braganza. Jaclyn's ex-partner Mark Gil and its brother's ex-wife Gina Alajar was also added to portray the roles Don Armando Braganza and Luming Valiente. The role Luming Valiente was supposedly given to Cherry Pie Picache but it did reject. Another veteran actor, John Regala was also added.

Roxanne Guinoo, Toby Alejar, Ramon Christopher Gutierrez and James Blanco were also added in extension of the series. Roxanne portrays the role Elaine Lee, originally played by Jean Garcia. Toby Alejar played as Roxanne's father, Gutierrez played as Trining's political opponent and James Blanco played as Maila's boyfriend. This was the third TV5 Drama project for James Blanco after Mga Nagbabagang Bulaklak and with Nadine Samonte in Rod Santiago's The Sisters. Another set of veteran actor and actresses were added to the series. Tirso Cruz III who played the original Theo Braganza now portrays the helping hand of Gardo Valiente, Don Luis Regalado. The original villainess Donya Trining Braganza, Odette Khan now returns as Minerva Magbanua, the mother of Jaclyn Jose being the new Donya Trining. Lorna Tolentino was added to portray the revenging former rebel Mila Regalado-Arden, Don Luis' sister and Maila's biological mother.

=== Location ===
The production is shot in Leviste Mansion, Hacienda Leviste and other town in Lipa City, Batangas.

== Critical reception ==
Critics praised Jaclyn Jose's performance as the main antagonist, Doña Trining Braganza which was originally played by Odette Khan in the original version because of her colorful outfits and impressive handling of lines. Memorable performances included the comeback of original characters Theo, Tirso Cruz III and Gardo, Michael de Mesa now played different roles. Tirso stars in a short appearance as Don Luis Regalado, a businessman and opponent of the late Armando Braganza while De Mesa's performance as Damian Valiente, main rival of Trining whose late wife Luming had a son out of wedlock named Gardo played by De Vera, the real Braganza. The TV series also tackled political views in modern society such as corruption, violence, and power.

== Theme Song ==
The official theme song of Valiente is an exceptional rendition of its original theme song as performed by its original singer and music composer, Vic Sotto. Lyrics were made by Gina Marissa Tagasa and rearranged by Marvin Querido.

== Production Staff ==
- Director: Joel Lamangan
- 2nd Unit Director: Rommel Penesa
- TV5 Head of Creatives and Entertainment: Perci M. Intalan
- Producer: Jojo Oconer
- Incharge of Production: Ramel David
- Production Unit Manager: Jeann Cabalda Bañaga
- Supervising Producer: Bhelle F. Francisco
- Original Story: Gina Marissa Tagasa
- Creative Manager: Elmer Gatchalian
- Head Writer: Danny Shelton
- Executive Producer: John Bradshaw
- Associate Producers: Vangie F. Castillo, Adrian V. Santos
- Writers: Ma. Zita S. Garganera, Liza Magtoto, Abner Tulagan, Joel Saracho
- Brainstormers: Emerson Jake Somera, Elle Ortiz Luis, Don Santella, Michelle Ngu
- Lighting Director: Monino Duque
- Production Designer: Edgar Martin Littaua
- Sound Supervision: Alberto Langitan
- Master Editor: Roy Diomampo
- Musical Scorer: Joubert Tan

=== Other Staff ===
- Technical Director: Renato Ching
- Assistant Director: Allan Noble, Paulo Molina
- Art Director: Renato Sanga, Diorgie Tubino
- Location Manager: Raul Caro
- Fight Instructor: John Lapid
- Supervising Editor: Don Santella
- Archangel Associate Editor: Mary Angeli Garcia
- Archangel Post Production Coordinator: Mario Rapinan
- Archangel Marketing and Promotions: Hanzel Vie Calma, Hazel Anne Liban
- Archangel Project Accountant: Mariz Lunaria
- Archangel Project Bookkeeper: Mavie Pamittan
- Cameramen: Jomar Uligan, Madison Fernandez, Jerry Burns, Rey
- Talent Coordinator: Virginia Genido
- Production Assistant: Edison Suarez, Mary Rose Manansala, Zayra Carreon
- Post Production Assistant: Reggie Panaguiton
- Recording Mixers of WildSound Studios: Addiss Tabono, Bebet Casas, Alex Tamboo, Roy Santos
- Stylist: Shahani Andel Gania
- Head Wardrobe: Simeon Guanizo
- Wardrobe: Ian Christopher Pangilinan, Jerry Nelson Dumayag, Jomar Pascua, Michael Aguyong
- Hair and Make-up Artists: Jessica Atendido, Ronel Buenavente, Christine Bunti, Eileen Ramos
- Gaffers: Wilson Rondina, Ramoncito Mariano, Sylvestre Bongay
- Assistant Location Manager: Virgilio Martinada
- Art Department: Ramil Pineda Robbie Vicente, McRichard Motel, Ferdinand Felicidario, Ezekiel Racho
- Art Department: Francisco Deogracia Jr., Mark Joseph Madriaga, John Martin De Guzman, Angel Benipayo
- Radio Caretaker: Elmo Gordas
- Utility: Romy Bello, Salve Defeo, Mark Joseph Caro
- Tent Caretakers: Junjun Rivera, Joey Dordas
- Crowd Control: Art Sajar, JR Decano
- Field Cashier: Ginger Laguata
- Legman: John Phillip Llamosa

== See also ==
- List of TV5 (Philippine TV network) original programming
- Valiente (1992 TV series)

== International broadcast ==
Country	Network(s)	Year
Uganda	NTV Uganda	2014
