= Walang Hanggan (2003 TV series) =

Philippine television drama series

- Also known as: Eternity
- Genre: Romantic drama
- Written by: R.J. Nuevas
- Directed by: Gina Alajar
- Starring: Valerie Concepcion; Oyo Boy Sotto
- Theme music composer: Janno Gibbs
- Opening theme: "Walang Hanggan" by Janno Gibbs
- Country of origin: Philippines
- Original language: Tagalog
- No. of episodes: 80

Production
- Executive producers: Antonio P. Tuviera; Malou Choa-Fagar
- Producer: Antonio P. Tuviera
- Camera setup: Multiple-camera setup
- Running time: 30 minutes
- Production company: TAPE Inc.

Original release
- Network: GMA Network
- Release: November 10, 2003 – February 27, 2004

Walang Hanggan (transl. no end / international title: Eternity) is a Philippine television drama romance series broadcast by GMA Network. Directed by Gina Alajar, it stars Valerie Concepcion and Oyo Boy Sotto. It premiered on November 10, 2003. The series concluded on February 27, 2004, with a total of 80 episodes.

== Cast and characters ==
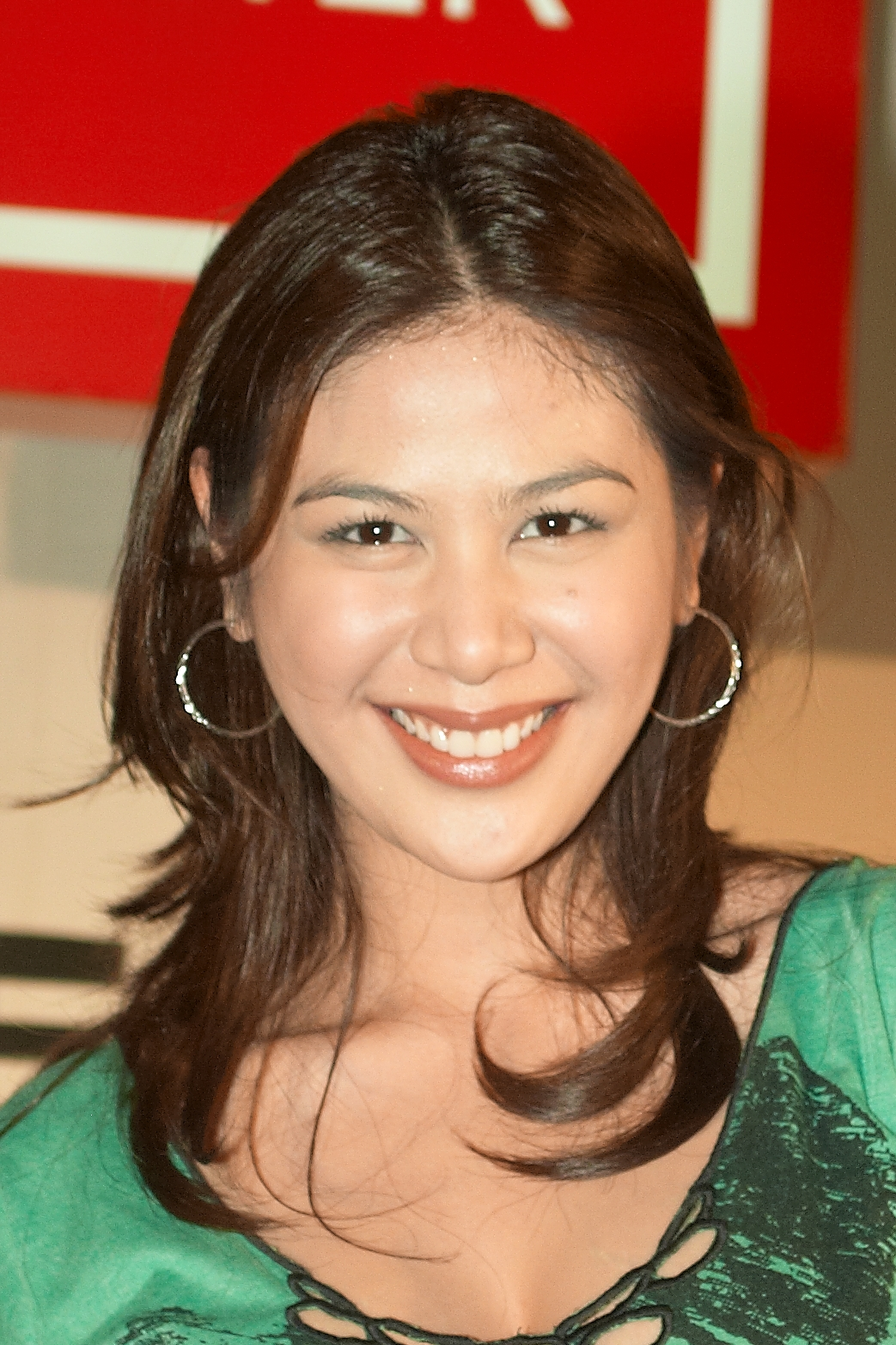
Valerie Concepcion portrays Almira.

Lead cast

- Valerie Concepcion as Almira
- Oyo Boy Sotto as Basti

Supporting cast

- Iya Villania as Rachelle
- Andrew Schimmer as Emil
- Miko Sotto as Mike
- Zoren Legaspi
- Sharmaine Arnaiz
- Perla Bautista
- Mikel Campos
- Marissa Sanchez
- Teri Onor
