= Heredero =

- Genre: Drama
- Created by: Television and Production Exponents (TAPE) Inc.
- Directed by: Herman Escueta
- Starring: Philip Gamboa; Manilyn Reynes; Helen Vela
- Country of origin: Philippines
- Original language: Filipino

Production
- Running time: 30 minutes

Original release
- Network: RPN
- Release: July 23, 1984 – September 4, 1987

Heredero is a Philippine television drama series produced by TAPE Inc. and broadcast by RPN. Directed by Herman Escueta, the series stars Philip Gamboa, Manilyn Reynes, and Helen Vela.

The show aired from July 23, 1984 to September 4, 1987, and was succeeded by Agila. Heredero tells the story of three children who were the lost children of a wealthy haciendero.

== Cast ==
- Manilyn Reynes as Laarni
- Helen Vela as Carla
- Conrad Poe as Fernando Magsalin
- Philip Gamboa as Lt. Varga
- Augusto Victa as Padre Jose
- Angelo Ventura as Leandro
- Luz Fernandez as Bella
- King Gutierrez as Abdul Talim
- Feling Gudia as Choleng
- Aida Arellano as Estela
- Rey Sagum as Jacobo
- Myrna Rosales as Pilar
- George Calma as Marco
- Malou Torrefranca as Hule
- Evangeline Sombre as Liway
- Richard Arellano as Limuel
- Bembol Roco
- Glaiza Herradura

== See also ==
- List of programs previously broadcast by Radio Philippines Network
