= Coney Reyes =

Filipino actress, comedian, host and producer (born 1954)

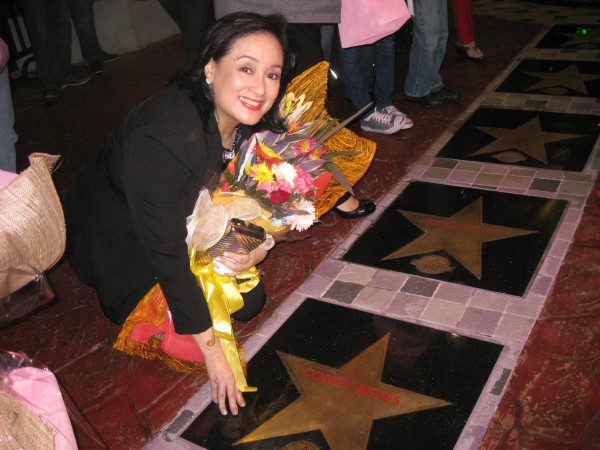
- Reyes at the Eastwood City Walk of Fame induction ceremony in 2011
- Born: Constancia Angeline Reyes Nubla; May 27, 1954 (age 72); Manila, Philippines
- Occupations: Actress, TV host and producer
- Years active: 1974–present
- Agents: GMA Network RPN ABS-CBN; APT Entertainment
- Spouse: Lawrence Mumar (m. 1973; ann. 1986)
- Children: 3 (including L.A. and Vico)

Constancia Angeline "Coney" Reyes Nubla (born May 27, 1954) is a Filipino film and television actress, comedian, television host and producer. Reyes has been widely recognized as the 'Queen of Matriarch Roles' due to her powerful and critically acclaimed portrayals of dominant family matriarchs in peak-television dramas such as Nathaniel, Love of My Life and My Dear Heart

She was also known as Madame Anna Manalastas after being in the main cast in the hit series 100 Days to Heaven, Reyes her acting debut in the 1974 film Return of the Dragon. She became the primary female co-host for noontime variety shows Student Canteen (1975–1982) and Eat Bulaga! (1982–1991). This was further cemented by her eponymous Coney Reyes on Camera (1984–1998) which ran for fourteen years, as well as her main role in Ang Munting Paraiso (1998–2002).

After a long career in day-time television, she started to appear in primetime teleseryes in supporting roles, and even as an antagonist. In contemporary Filipino popular culture, Reyes is famous for her lead roles in family-oriented television dramas Nathaniel, and My Dear Heart, as well as for her role as Grace Salazar in Four Sisters and a Wedding

== Early years ==
Reyes earned a degree of Bachelor of Arts major in Communication Arts at Maryknoll College (now Miriam College). Reyes was a student leader and consistent dean's lister during her college days. She was a Baron Travel Girl of 1974 finalist before she entered Philippine Showbiz.

== Career ==
=== 1974–1984: Career beginnings and breakthrough with Coney Reyes on Camera ===
Before being exposed to acting, she served as a "TV girl" (equivalent of radio VJs) introducing shows and reading advertisements for BBC-2.

Reyes made her first film appearance in The Return of the Dragon (1974) alongside Ramon Zamora playing the lead role. Following her debut in for films, she made her maiden appearance on Student Canteen, a Philippine noontime variety show on GMA-7, on January 6, 1975, where she served as primary female co-host with Pepe Pimentel, Eddie Ilarde and Bobby Ledesma up to 1982.

Nine years following her debut in The Return of the Dragon, she starred in Bago Kumalat ang Kamandag (1983) and won Best Actress during the 1983 Metro Manila Film Festival.

After Student Canteen, Reyes then named "Coney Reyes-Mumar", got her own television series to host titled Coney Reyes-Mumar Studio (1977). The series only lasted one year. Four years later, Reyes was given another series – Coney Reyes Mumar on Set (1981), but like Coney Reyes-Mumar Studio, it only lasted one year before ending.

=== 1982–1991: Eat... Bulaga! welcomes a new family member and breakthrough with Coney Reyes on Camera ===
On March 7, 1982, Coney Reyes-Mumar was unceremoniously sacked by the management of Student Canteen for reasons not widely known. Shortly after, she was offered to be Eat... Bulaga!'s new female co-host, replacing Chiqui Hollman (her counterpart in the said program), who left to join its rival show, Student Canteen.

For two months, Reyes contemplated on joining Eat... Bulaga!. In the meantime, she did a movie with Joseph Estrada, and a week-long co-hosting stint at Daigdig ng mga Misis sa Telebisyon (BBC-2 with former Student Canteen co-host Pepe Pimentel.

On May 18, 1982, Coney Reyes-Mumar was heralded as the newest member of the Eat... Bulaga! family, coinciding with the DOMSAT (Domestic Satellite) launch of the program in a television special at RPN-9. On that same television special, Eat... Bulaga!'s now-famous theme song debuted, with Coney being mentioned in the lyrics for being the only female co-host. She was warmly received by the viewers of the then-number one noontime variety show, bringing with her the sympathy of the audience due to her firing at Student Canteen.

In 1984, Reyes starred in a lead role in Lovingly Yours: The Movie, the movie adaptation of good friend Helen Vela's Lovingly Yours, Helen, in the segment "Akin Ang Walang Diyos", a horror drama starring Julie Vega. Vega and Reyes starred in the segment one year before Vega's death in 1985.

After the cancellations of Coney Reyes-Mumar Studio and Coney Reyes Mumar on Set, Reyes was given her own anthology series called Coney Reyes on Camera, rival to Lovingly Yours, Helen on GMA-7. The series ran from 1984 to 1998 making the longest running Philippine anthology television series before Maalaala Mo Kaya broke the record in 2011. The drama was a success and won the PMPC Star Awards for Television category for Best Drama Anthology three consecutive times. Reyes portrayed different parts in the series – host, lead star, and also producer.

Despite the 'network drama anthology' rivalry of Reyes's Coney Reyes on Camera and Helen Vela's Lovingly Yours, Helen (which actually ran on Saturdays and Sundays, respectively), Reyes starred in an episode in Lovingly Yours in 1990 with Vela and with other close friends including Vilma Santos and Tina Revilla-Valencia. Returning the favor, Reyes starred again with friends Vilma and Tina for a tribute episode in 1994 to Helen, who died of cancer two years prior.

In the late 1980s, rumors spread of Reyes and Eat... Bulaga! co-host Vic Sotto having a romantic relationship. By then Reyes' marriage to Larry Mumar was annulled, and Sotto having separated with his wife, Dina Bonnevie, in 1986. Vic and Coney's relationship, for a while, went public until Coney filed for a maternity leave at EB just after the program's move from RPN-9 to ABSCBN-2 in February 1989. Reyes returned to the program in time for its 10th-anniversary celebration in September that year, only three months after giving birth to son Vico.

In December 1991, a year after becoming a born-again Christian, Reyes left Eat... Bulaga! permanently, although her name was still mentioned in the theme song until 1995.

=== 1991–1998: Focusing on Coney Reyes on Camera ===
After Eat... Bulaga!, she focused on her weekly drama anthology, Coney Reyes on Camera. The program, along with other TAPE, Inc. produced shows, moved to ABS-CBN in 1989 after the government sequestration of RPN-9.

By 1995, when TAPE, Inc. left ABS-CBN (along with Eat... Bulaga!) for GMA-7, Reyes was in charge of her show with CAN Television and Productions (derived from her real name, Constancia Angeline Nubla) along with the network's production unit, and thus Coney Reyes on Camera remained in ABS-CBN.

On the later years of the program, she stopped acting in the show and only did the opening and closing segments.

On December 26, 1998, Coney Reyes on Camera aired its final episode, and Coney went on a two-month hiatus.

=== 1999: After Coney Reyes on Camera, return to teleseryes ===
Months after Coney Reyes on Camera ended, Reyes returned to television by starring in Ang Munting Paraiso (1999–2002), a weekly family drama which ran for three years, chronicling around the life of Margarita Dionisio (Reyes) – the matriarch of the Dionisio family and the best cook in the town. Reyes stars with fellow veteran actor, Ronaldo Valdez as her husband, and CJ Ramos, Sarah Christophers, and Jericho Rosales as her children, respectively.

During the run of Ang Munting Paraiso, Reyes also starred in Sa Puso Ko Iingatan Ka (2001–03) alongside Judy Ann Santos and Piolo Pascual portraying the mother of Patricia, played by Judy Ann Santos. This series would be Reyes last year in a soap opera following an almost four-year hiatus from television and also films.

In 2004, Reyes appeared in her former daily show Eat... Bulaga!'s 25th Anniversary Special held in Expo Pilipino at Clark, Pampanga. With a special number herself and with Tito, Vic, and Joey, it was their first reunion as the memorable quartet in the program, since Coney's departure from EB more than a decade ago.

After her four-year hiatus, Reyes reunited with her Sa Puso Ko Iingatan Ka co-star Judy Ann Santos in 2007 to star in Ysabella (2007–08). This series catapulted Coney Reyes as being dubbed as the Primera Kontrabida. For her performance in Ysabella, she was nominated for Best Actress in the 22nd PMPC Star Awards for Television in 2008 for her portrayal as Victoria Amarillo. Coney Reyes's Victoria is one of the most iconic villains in Philippine television due to her attitude, schemes, and looks.

Shortly after Ysabella ended, she starred in Maalaala Mo Kaya (2009) episode Tattoo alongside Rodjun Cruz, Jim Paredes, and Maureen Mauricio, and went on to star in more episodes.

Twelve years after her reunion movie with Vic Sotto in Biyudo si Daddy, Biyuda si Mommy (1997), Reyes made her comeback to the film industry to star alongside Bea Alonzo, Derek Ramsay, and Sam Milby in And I Love You, a film revolving around three lovers.

In 2010, Reyes made another return to television in Rubi (2010), a remake of the 2004 Mexican Televisa series of the same name. The series stars Jake Cuenca, Shaina Magdayao, Diether Ocampo, and Angelica Panganiban portraying the title role of Rubi, a girl who is scheming, ambitious, and cunning who has a conscience, but chooses not to listen to it to reach her dreams at the expense of others. Reyes plays the supporting role of Elisa Ferrer – Hector's (Ocampo) overprotective mother who disapproves of Rubi in being in her son's life and becoming his wife.

After portraying several supporting roles in Sa Puso Ko Iingatan Ka, Ysabella, and Rubi, Reyes was given her first lead role since Ang Munting Paraiso. She starred in the critically acclaimed 100 Days to Heaven (2011) as Madam Anna Manalastas, a cold-hearted woman who returns to earth in her childhood form in order to correct her mistakes. Starring with her are Jodi Sta. Maria as Sophia, Anna's (Reyes) long lost daughter, and Xyriel Manabat who portrays Young Anna Manalastas. The series received five nominations and won four of the five. Reyes and Manabat were nominated for Pop Kapamilya TV Character for their portrayal of Anna Manalastas in the ASAP Pop Viewers' Choice Awards.

Two years after 100 Days to Heaven, Reyes made her return to primetime television in Judy Ann Santos's Huwag Ka Lang Mawawala (2013) in 2013. She portrays the role of Helena Diomedes, the mother-in-law of Anessa (Santos) who completely despises her.

In 2013, Reyes co-starred in Four Sisters and a Wedding (2013) as Grace Salazar. Reyes' character portrayal and lines, as well as the movie itself, has since become a part of popular Filipino culture. Four Sisters and a Wedding is Reyes's most recent film to date.

After almost 25 years with ABS-CBN, Reyes decided to transfer to ABS-CBN's rival network GMA Network upon the invitation of Redgie Acuña Magno, the executive vice-president for drama, coinciding with her 40th year in the industry.

With her transfer for GMA Network, she starred in Ang Dalawang Mrs. Real (2014) alongside Maricel Soriano, Lovi Poe, and Dingdong Dantes. Reyes portrayed the role of Sonia Real, the mother of Anthony Real (Dantes), a man who fell in love with two different women of two different ages and decides to marry them both. The series was nominated for Best Primetime Series for the PMPC Star Awards for TV 2014 and won two awards – one from Golden Screen TV Awards and one from US Intl Film Video Festival 2015.

In part as a promotion for Ang Dalawang Mrs. Real, Reyes guested on Startalk, an entertainment news television series, for an emotional reunion with former EB co-host and long-time friend, Joey de Leon.

=== 2014–2018: Return to ABS-CBN and Future projects ===
After finishing her show on GMA Network, Reyes decided to return to ABS-CBN. Soon after her return to ABS-CBN, she was set to star in Nathaniel (2015), a fantasy television series focusing of faith and restoring goodness to humanity. Reyes stars alongside Marco Masa, Gerald Anderson, Isabelle Daza, and also her Rubi and 100 Days to Heaven co-star Shaina Magdayao. Reyes portrays the role of AVL, a rich businesswoman who forgets her faith in God and gets followers in becoming rich and successful.

Two years later, she was then said to star in My Dear Heart (2017) with Zanjoe Marudo, Bela Padilla, Ria Atayde, and Nayomi "Heart" Ramos as Heart De Jesus. The series revolves around Heart De Jesus, a sick kid who becomes a spirit. Reyes plays the role of Dr. Margaret Divinagracia, a rich doctor who is the biological grandmother of Heart (Ramos). After My Dear Heart ended, she guested on Magandang Buhay (2017) with her children Vico Sotto and L.A. Mumar. During the episode, Reyes was given a special message from her children, Sotto and Mumar, respectively.

=== 2018–present: Back as a Kapuso ===
After four years with the Kapamilya network, Reyes made a comeback in GMA Network as part of Victor Magtanggol, starring Alden Richards. In 2020, she also starred in Love of My Life, playing the role of the fierce and tough mother/mother-in-law, Isabella Gonzales.

Reyes made a special one-day return to Eat Bulaga! during the celebration of the program's 43rd anniversary.

== Personal life ==
A born-again Christian since October 1990, Reyes previously co-hosted with Peter Kairuz in The 700 Club Asia which used to air on GMA News TV (now GTV, formerly QTV). She is an active member and a discipleship group leader of Victory Christian Fellowship.

She is mother to Lawrence Anthony "L.A." Mumar and Carla Mumar (with former husband, former basketball player Lawrence "Larry" Mumar) and Pasig Mayor Vico Sotto (with ex-boyfriend Vic Sotto).

== Acting Credits ==
=== Film ===
Year	Title	Role	Notes
1972	The Return of the Dragon		
1972	7 Crazy Dragons		
1974	Bornebol: Special Agent		
1975	Basta't Isipin Mong Mahal Kita		
1975	Mga Anting-Anting ni Ompong		
1977	Nagbabagang Asero		
1980	Peter Maknat		
1980	Ang Aguila at ang Falcon		
1981	Takbo, Peter, Takbo		
1981	Adiong Bulutong		
1982	Pedring Taruc		
1983	Bago Kumalat ang Kamandag		Credited as "Coney Reyes Mumar"
1984	Daddy's Little Darlings	Carmen	Credited as "Coney Reyes Mumar"
1984	Lovingly Yours: The Movie	Minerva	Segment: "Akin Ang Walang Diyos"; Credited as "Coney Reyes Mumar"
1984	Ang Padrino		
1985	Ano Ka Hilo?		
1985	Muling Buksan ang Puso	Remedios "Meding" Andrada	
1985	Bomba Arrienda	Nora	
1988	Good Morning, Titser	Consuelo	
1997	Biyudo si Daddy, Biyuda si Mommy	Constancia	
2009	And I Love You So	Kate Cruz	
2010	Mrs. Recto	Chona Aquino	
2013	Four Sisters and a Wedding	Grace Salazar	
2023	Rewind	Leonora	

=== Television ===
Year	Title	Role	Notes	Source
1975–1982	Student Canteen	Herself — Host	Reyes served as the primary female co-host of the daily noontime variety show Student Canteen on GMA-7 from January 6, 1975, to 1982	
1977	Coney Reyes-Mumar Studio	Herself — Host / oVarious	The show premiered as Coney Reyes-Mumar on the Set. She eventually dropped "Mumar" from the title and renamed it Coney Reyes on Camera following her estrangement from her then-husband, basketball player Lawrence Mumar	
1981	Coney Reyes Mumar on the Set	Herself — Host / oVarious	Coney Reyes-Mumar Studio (also known as Coney Reyes-Mumar Drama Studio) was Coney Reyes' very first titular television series, which premiered in 1977 on GMA Network.	
1982–1991, 2003, 2022	Eat Bulaga!	Herself — Co-host	Reyes was the primary female co-host of Eat... Bulaga! from May 18, 1982, until 1991	
1984–1998	Coney Reyes on Camera	Herself — Host / Various	in her Anthology: Reyes portrays all of the main characters in each episode	
1988	Hapi House!	Constancia/Constance	Reyes played a supporting role as the character	
1990	Lovingly Yours, Helen		While Reyes was the host of her own competing anthology series, she shared a deep personal connection and professional history with Helen Vela and the iconic drama Lovingly Yours, Helen	
1996–present	The 700 Club Asia	Herself — Host		
1996	Maalaala Mo Kaya	Letty	Episode: "Baul"	
1998	Star Drama Presents: Matinee Idol	Herself	Coney worked with the Late Rico Yan in this Episode	
1999–2002	Ang Munting Paraiso	Margarita Dionisio		
2001–2003	Sa Puso Ko Iingatan Ka	Mayla Lizandro-Montecillo		
2004	Bahay Mo Ba 'To?	Azon	Guest Cast Appeared in Episode 34	
2006	Pinoy Big Brother: Teen Edition 1	Spirtual Adviser - House Guest	Coney visited Kuya's House to Give Advice to the Housemates	
2007–2008	That's My Doc	Coney	Guest Cast Appeared in Episode 9	
2007–2008	Ysabella	Doña Victoria Montalban-Amarillo	Antagonist Role	
2009	Maalaala Mo Kaya	Nadz	Episode: "Tattoo"	
2010	Rubi	Elisa Bermudez-Ferrer		
2010	Who Wants to Be a Millionaire?	Celebrity Contestant		Reyes appeared as a celebrity contestant on the Filipino version of Who Wants to be a Millionaire? on March 13, 2010. She walked away with ₱600,000 for the Real Life Foundation.
2010	Maalaala Mo Kaya	Amelia	Episode: "Cross-Stitch"	
2011	100 Days to Heaven	Madame Anna Manalastas	First Lead Role in Primetime Bida with Xyriel Manabat in Episode 76, She credited as " Ms. Coney Reyes "	
2011	Rated K	Herself - Guest	When Korina Sanchez visited them on the set of 100 Days to Heaven	
2011	Maalaala Mo Kaya	Mila	Episode: "Stroller"	
2012	Maalaala Mo Kaya	Lola Joy	Episode: "Stuffed Toy"	
2012	Wansapanataym	Mamu	Episode: "Bye, Bye Bangungot"	
2013	Huwag Ka Lang Mawawala	Doña Helena Diomedes		
2014	Maalaala Mo Kaya	Angie	Episode: "Kwintas"	
2014	Ang Dalawang Mrs. Real	Sonia Villanueva-Real		
2015	Nathaniel	Angela "A.V.L." Villanueva-Laxamana		
2015	Maalala Mo Kaya	Cleofe	Episode: " Gasa "	
2017	My Dear Heart	Dr. Margaret Divinagracia-Lana		
2018	Wanda's Wonderful World	Wanda		
2018	Victor Magtanggol	Vivienne Delos Santos-Magtanggol		
2020–2021	Love of My Life	Madam Isabella Gonzales		
2024	All-Out Sundays	Herself — Guest		
2024–2025	Shining Inheritance	Aurea dela Costa		

== Awards and nominations ==
Name of the award ceremony, year presented, award category, nominee(s) of the award, and the result of the nomination
Award ceremony	Year	Category	Nominee(s)	Result	Ref.
Eastwood City Walk of Fame	2011	Celebrity Inductee	—N/a	Won	
ASAP Pop Viewers' Choice Awards		ASAP Pop Viewers' Choice Awards	100 Days to Heaven	Nominated	
Metro Manila Film Festival	1983	Best Actress	Bago Kumalat ang Kamandag	Won	
PMPC Star Awards for Television	2008	Best Drama Actress	Ysabella	Nominated	
PMPC Star Awards for Television	2015	Ading Fernando Lifetime Achievement Award	—N/a	Won	
PMPC Star Awards for Television	2015	Best Drama Actress	Nathaniel	Nominated	
PMPC Star Awards for Television	2016	Best Single Performance by an Actress	Maalala Mo Kaya: Gasa	Nominated	
PMPC Star Awards for Television	2017	Best Drama Actress	My Dear Heart	Nominated	
PMPC Star Awards for Television	2021	Best Drama Actress	Love of My Life	Nominated	

== External links and sources ==
- Coney Reyes at IMDb
- The 700 Club
