= Antonio Tuviera =

Filipino businessman (born 1952)

Antonio Pablo Tuviera
- Born: Antonio P. Tuviera; February 6, 1952 (age 74); Manila, Philippines
- Other names: Tony, Mr. T
- Occupation: Producer
- Spouse: Madz Tuviera
- Children: 2, including Mike

Antonio Pablo Tuviera (born February 6, 1952), more simply known as Tony Tuviera or by his nickname Mr. T, is a Filipino media producer and businessman. He served as the president and CEO of Television and Production Exponents Inc. (TAPE Inc.), the production company behind the noontime show Eat Bulaga! which he co-created in 1979 with fellow businessman Romeo Jalosjos Sr. as well as the show's original hosts Tito Sotto, Vic Sotto, and Joey de Leon.

== Education ==
Tuviera attended high school at the Colegio de San Juan de Letran in the 1960s.

== Career ==
Tuviera co-created the variety show Eat Bulaga! on RPN in 1979. By the mid-1980s, he created the RPN anthology television program TV Box Office, which recruited directors such as Argel Joseph, Mel Chionglo and Boots Plata. In 1987, Tuviera created the fantasy sitcom Okay Ka, Fairy Ko!, which initially aired on IBC and later transferred to ABS-CBN and GMA.

In 1994, Tuviera founded the production company APT Entertainment.

=== Eat Bulaga! dispute ===
In March 2023, the new management of TAPE Inc. forced Tuviera to retire as the president and CEO and Romeo Jalosjos Jr. was named as his replacement. Tuviera still has ownership of the company as of June 2023 according to Tito Sotto. The original Eat Bulaga! hosts came into a dispute with the new management which would eventually lead to their exit from TAPE Inc. (but not leaving the show itself) at the end of May.

Media offices
Preceded by Company Established	President and Chief Executive Officer of Television and Production Exponents Inc. 1981-2023	Succeeded by Romeo M. Jalosjos Jr.
