= Leya, ang Pinakamagandang Babae sa Ilalim ng Lupa =

Philippine television drama series

- Title card
- Also known as: Leya, the Most Beautiful Numbali
- Genre: Fantasy drama
- Directed by: Ruel S. Bayani
- Starring: Nadine Samonte; Oyo Boy Sotto
- Theme music composer: Joey de Leon; Vic Sotto
- Opening theme: "Ikaw Lamang" by Tricia Amper-Jimenez
- Country of origin: Philippines
- Original language: Tagalog
- No. of episodes: 75

Production
- Executive producers: Antonio P. Tuviera; Malou Choa-Fagar
- Producer: Antonio P. Tuviera
- Camera setup: Multiple-camera setup
- Running time: 30 minutes
- Production company: TAPE Inc.

Original release
- Network: GMA Network
- Release: October 18, 2004 – January 28, 2005

Leya, ang Pinakamagandang Babae sa Ilalim ng Lupa (transl. Leya, the most beautiful girl underneath the land / international title: Leya, the Most Beautiful Numbali) is a Philippine television drama fantasy series broadcast by GMA Network. Directed by Ruel S. Bayani, it stars Nadine Samonte in the title role and Oyo Boy Sotto. It premiered on October 18, 2004. The series concluded on January 28, 2005, with a total of 75 episodes.

== Cast and characters ==
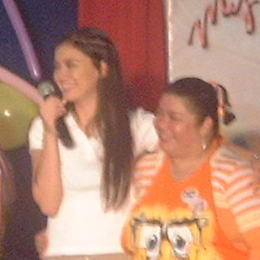
Nadine Samonte (left) portrays Leya

Lead cast

- Nadine Samonte as Leya
- Oyo Boy Sotto as Emman

Supporting cast

- Bing Loyzaga as Rosario
- Amy Perez as Maruba
- Jake Roxas as Gilbert
- Jennifer Sevilla as Lorinda
- Kier Legaspi as Eladio
- Lindsay Custodio as Fajita
- Jordan Herrera as Bardok
- Jenine Desiderio as Bararak
- Denise Laurel as Kathleen
- Abigael Arazo as Bumbum

Recurring cast

- Jan Marini as Delia
- Maybelyn dela Cruz as Gamela
- Lester Llansang as Aries
- Dyan Delfin as Lantaya
- Gemmalyn Estrada as Chinggay
- Bon Vivar as Hari
