= Frances Makil-Ignacio =

Filipino actress

Frances Makil-Ignacio (born March 29, 1971) is a Filipino actress. From 2001 to 2012, she starred in numerous shows of ABS-CBN as a contract actress. In 2012, she briefly transferred to TV5 as part of Valiente before staging an ABS-CBN comeback the same year. She officially moved to GMA Network during 2013 where her career catapulted for playing the role of Mama Josie in Mundo Mo'y Akin, which won numerous award nominations. Ignacio later switched to freelance acting in 2015 but is mostly seen on GMA-7.

== Filmography ==
=== Film ===
| Year | Title | Role |
|---|---|---|
| 2013 | When the Love is Gone | Professor |
| 2014 | Trophy Wife | Clerk of Court |
| 2015 | You're Still the One | Terry |

=== Television ===
| Year | Title | Role |
|---|---|---|
| 2001–2003 | Sa Dulo ng Walang Hanggan | Anita Brown / Tamara Sembrano |
| 2003–2006 | Maalaala Mo Kaya | Various Roles |
| 2003–2004 | Buttercup | Lily |
| 2004 | Marina | Ignarva |
| 2005 | Kampanerang Kuba | Sarah Durano |
| 2006 | Calla Lily | Marianne |
| 2007 | Love Spell | |
| 2007 | Maria Flordeluna | Marie |
| 2007–2008 | Prinsesa ng Banyera | Mayora Violeta Villar |
| 2008 | Iisa Pa Lamang | Winnie "Tita Winnie" Ignacio |
| 2009 | Your Song: Muntik Na Kitang Minahal | Eric's mother |
| 2009 | Tayong Dalawa | Karen |
| 2009 | Precious Hearts Romances Presents: Ang Lalaking Nagmahal Sa Akin | Olga |
| 2010 | Kung Tayo'y Magkakalayo | Psychologist |
| 2010 | Precious Hearts Romances Presents: The Substitute Bride | Elena Albantes |
| 2010 | Kokey @ Ako | Toribia |
| 2011 | Minsan Lang Kita Iibigin | Adele |
| 2011–2012 | Maria la del Barrio | Jessica |
| 2012 | Budoy | Doctor |
| 2012 | Valiente | Martha |
| 2012 | Regal Shocker: Manananggal | Minerva |
| 2012 | Kahit Puso'y Masugatan | Amanda Balmaceda |
| 2012–2013 | Princess and I | Ellen Salamat |
| 2013 | Mundo Mo'y Akin | Mama Josie |
| 2013 | Adarna | Aling Teray |
| 2014 | The Borrowed Wife | Olive |
| 2014 | Ang Dalawang Mrs. Real | Marife D. Salazar |
| 2014 | Seasons of Love: First Dance, First Love | Yaya Mabel |
| 2014–2015 | More Than Words | Cristina Acosta |
| 2015 | Second Chances | Atty. Consuelo Timeo |
| 2015 | My Mother's Secret | Chato |
| 2015 | Doble Kara | Susan Ligaya |
| 2015 | Wansapanataym: Kuryente Kid | Penelope's mother |
| 2016 | #ParangNormal Activity | Isabel |
| 2016 | Ipaglaban Mo!: Bintang | Julia's mother |
| 2016 | Dear Uge | Ellen |
| 2016 | Magkaibang Mundo | Celia |
| 2016–2017 | Someone to Watch Over Me | Cecilia "Cess" Navarro |
| 2017 | My Love from the Star | Leonora Infante |
| 2017–2023 | Daig Kayo ng Lola Ko | Metring |
| 2017–2018 | My Korean Jagiya | Caridad "Carrie" Washington |
| 2018 | Stories for the Soul: Kasama Mo ang Diyos | Minerva |
| 2018 | Pamilya Roces | Marilou "Lulu" Lucero |
| 2019 | My Special Tatay | Mamita |
| 2019 | Daig Kayo ng Lola Ko: Lola Enchanted | Pacencia |
| 2019 | The Better Woman | Amy Santos |
| 2019 | Call Me Tita | Dra. Magno |
| 2020 | Magpakailanman: Sayaw ng Buhay (The Lairca Nicdao Story) | Jessica |
| 2020 | Pamilya Ko | Marny |
| 2021 | First Yaya | Senator Rosales |
| 2021 | Ampalaya Chronicles: Me & Mrs. Cruz | Lally |
| 2023 | Cattleya Killer | Lorelei Mumar |
| 2023 | Abot-Kamay na Pangarap | Eleanor Villarica |
| 2026 | A.ni.mál | Lily |
