= Helen Vela =

Filipina actress, broadcaster and producer (1946-1992)

Helen Vela Hernandez
- Vela in 1975
- Born: Helen P. Vela; October 31, 1946; Manila, Philippines
- Died: February 14, 1992 (aged 45); Rochester, Minnesota, U.S.
- Other names: Ate Helen; Helen Vela Punzalan
- Occupations: Actress, broadcaster, producer
- Years active: 1963–1992
- Known for: Lovingly Yours, Helen
- Spouses: Orly Punzalan (m. 1967; div. 1973) Ben Hernandez (m. 1973)
- Children: 4, including Princess
- Relatives: Karen Punzalan (granddaughter)

Helen Vela Hernandez (formerly Punzalan; October 31, 1946 – February 14, 1992) was a Filipino actress and radio and television personality.

== Early life ==
She was born on October 31, 1946, in Manila, Philippines.

== Career ==
Vela started her career in broadcasting as a radio announcer. She appeared on GMA Network (later BBC) show, Lovingly Yours, Helen. Followed by RPN shows are Heredero and Agila. She was also a presenter at GMA Balita, GMA's first early evening Filipino newscast.

== Personal life ==
In 1967, Vela married broadcaster Orly Punzalan (1935–2005), with whom she had two children: Pastor Paolo Punzalan, senior pastor of Victory Fort Bonifacio, and Princess Punzalan, born Bernadette Vela Punzalan, a nurse and former actress. They separated five years later and divorced. In 1973, Vela remarried, to Ben Hernandez. They had a son, Reuben.

== Death ==
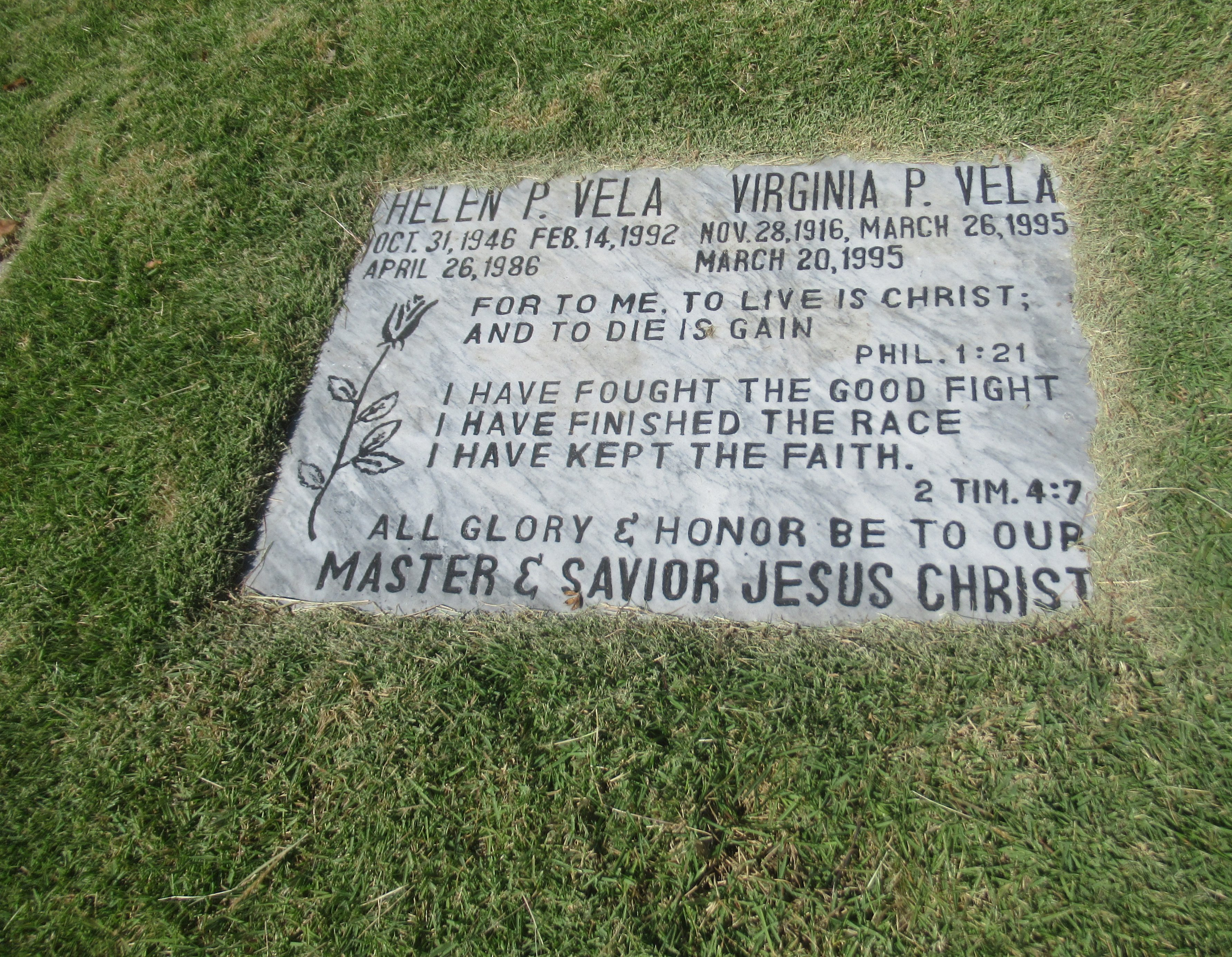
Vela's grave at Manila Memorial Park – Sucat.

She died of lymphoma on February 14, 1992 (Valentine's Day) at St. Mary's Hospital, Mayo Clinic in Rochester, Minnesota, United States at the age of 45.

She was buried at the Manila Memorial Park in Parañaque City. Alongside her lies her mother Virginia Vela, who died in 1995, and her first husband Orly Punzalan, who died in 2005.

== Lifetime achievement award ==
In 2004, the Golden Screen Awards for Television instituted a "Helen Vela Lifetime Achievement Award" for outstanding contribution to the Philippine television industry.

== Legacy and honors ==
She was posthumously inducted as a Star to the Eastwood City Walk of Fame Philippines in December 2011.

== Filmography ==
=== Film ===
Year	Title	Role
1969	Halina Neneng Ko	
1969	Fiesta Extravaganza	
1983	Roman Rapido	Mameng
1984	Lovingly Yours, Helen (The Movie)	Narrator
1988	Puso sa Puso	Wilma
1988	Angelica, Sugo sa Lupa	
1990	Kung Tapos na ang Kailanman (her last film)	

=== Television ===
Year	Title	Role
1980–1992	Lovingly Yours, Helen	Host
1984–1987	Heredero	Nina
1986–1992	GMA Balita	News Anchor
1987–1992	Agila	Ester
1989–1992	Family 3 Plus 1	Amy
