= Lovingly Yours, Helen =

Philippine television drama series

- Title card
- Also known as: Lovingly Yours (Note: 1992–96.)
- Genre: Drama
- Presented by: Helen Vela; Princess Punzalan; Helen Gamboa; Boots Anson-Roa
- Country of origin: Philippines
- Original language: Tagalog
- No. of seasons: 16

Production
- Executive producer: Redgie Acuña-Magno
- Producers: Helen Vela; Princess Punzalan
- Camera setup: Multiple-camera setup
- Running time: 90 minutes
- Production company: Hyper-Visions Productions Inc.

Original release
- Network: GMA Network (1980–84, 1986–96); Banahaw Broadcasting Corporation (1984–86)
- Release: September 7, 1980 – September 1, 1996

Lovingly Yours, Helen is a Philippine television drama anthology series broadcast by GMA Network and Banahaw Broadcasting Corporation. Originally hosted by Helen Vela, it premiered on September 7, 1980. The series moved to Banahaw Broadcasting Corporation in 1984. It returned to GMA Network on March 23, 1986. The series concluded on September 1, 1996.

== Overview ==
The anthology evolved into a television drama anthology from a daily counseling program on radio with the same title, originally aired on DZBB. It was presented by television/radio personality Helen Vela. Each episode is based on the letter sender's life stories sent by viewers.

The show's radio version, which is a live counselling program, continued to air on weekdays. The radio show moved to BBC's FM station DWOK-FM in 1984, and returned to DZBB in 1986.

In 1980, the program transformed from a radio program to a television drama anthology. In 1984, due to popularity of the series, Lovingly Yours, Helen was adapted into a four-part anthology film directed by Argel Joseph. Following Vela's death in 1992, her daughter Princess Punzalan took over her as the host.

== Accolades ==
Accolades received by Lovingly Yours, Helen
Year	Award	Category	Recipient	Result	Ref.
1988	2nd PMPC Star Awards for Television	Best Drama Series	Lovingly Yours, Helen	Nominated	
1992	6th PMPC Star Awards for Television	Best Single Performance by an Actor	Ruben Rustia	Won	
1992	6th PMPC Star Awards for Television	Best Single Performance by an Actor	Harlene Bautista	Won	
1994	8th PMPC Star Awards for Television	Best Daytime Drama Anthology	Lovingly Yours	Won	
1995	9th PMPC Star Awards for Television	Best Daytime Drama Anthology	Lovingly Yours	Won	
1996	10th PMPC Star Awards for Television	Gawad Dekada Awardees	Lovingly Yours	Won	
