= Coney Reyes on Camera =

1984–98 Philippine television drama series

- Title Card
- Genre: Drama; Anthology
- Created by: CAN Television and Productions and TAPE Inc.
- Directed by: Mario O'Hara; Argel Joseph; Nick Lizazo
- Presented by: Coney Reyes
- Opening theme: "It's My Turn" instrumentals
- Ending theme: "It's My Turn" instrumentals "You Are My Song" by Regine Velasquez (during Mother's Day episode in May 9, 1998) "Lament of the Wild Geese" by James Galway (during the show's last months of airing)
- Country of origin: Philippines
- Original language: Filipino
- No. of episodes: 745

Production
- Executive producer: Ellen Rodriguez
- Producer: Constancia Angeline Nubla
- Running time: 90 minutes
- Production companies: CAN Television and Productions; TAPE Inc. (1989–92); ABS-CBN Entertainment (1989–98)

Original release
- Network: RPN (1984–89); ABS-CBN (1989–98)
- Release: May 19, 1984 – December 26, 1998

Coney Reyes on Camera is a Philippine television drama anthology series broadcast by RPN and ABS-CBN. Hosted by Coney Reyes, it aired from May 19, 1984 to December 26, 1998, replacing Coney Reyes - Mumar on the Set and was replaced by Ang Munting Paraiso. It was the longest running drama anthology of its time in Philippine TV history until Maalaala Mo Kaya broke the record in 2006.

== Overview ==
The drama anthology stars Reyes herself. Jaclyn Jose and Gina Alajar also played protagonist roles in some episodes.

Reyes had been working with major celebrities such as Vic Sotto, Vilma Santos, Helen Vela, Aiza Seguerra, German Moreno, Aga Muhlach, Sharon Cuneta, Rico Yan, Jolina Magdangal, Nora Aunor, and Judy Ann Santos, among others. Kris Aquino (daughter of the late former President Corazon Aquino and sister of the late former President Benigno Aquino III), Imee Marcos (daughter of the late former President Ferdinand Marcos and sister of the current President Bongbong Marcos), and Michelle van Eimeren (Miss Australia Universe 1994), also appeared on the show in separate episodes. One of the most unforgettable episodes was the reunion episode with Vilma Santos and Tina Revilla-Valencia in 1994 as a special tribute to the late Helen Vela.

The roots of Reyes' drama anthology was the Coney Reyes-Mumar Drama Studio, produced by Eddie Ilarde's Program Philippines and aired every Saturday on GMA Radio Television Arts after the hit noontime variety show Student Canteen (also produced by Program Philippines), where Reyes was a co-host. However, in 1982, Reyes moved to Student Canteen's rival show Eat Bulaga!, then airing on RPN. Drama Studio continued with former beauty queen Chat Silayan as its main star. Silayan, along with Chiqui Hollmann, also replaced Reyes on Canteen.

In 1984, Reyes was given a new drama anthology on RPN, originally entitled Coney Reyes-Mumar On The Set, premiering on May 19, 1984. It aired right after Eat Bulaga! on Saturdays, and was first produced by BSH Productions. She later took over production of the show when she put up CAN Television ("CAN" was derived from Reyes' real name, Constancia Angeline Nubla, under which she was credited as the show's producer). It was then retitled Coney Reyes On Camera (with the last name "Mumar" dropped after her estrangement with then-husband Larry Mumar).

After the sequestration of RPN on February 11, 1989 (which would later become RPTV), the show, along with Eat Bulaga! and Agila (both produced by TAPE), moved to ABS-CBN. TAPE produced shows would remain on the network until January 22, 1995, even after Reyes left the production company in 1992. After the transfer of TAPE shows to GMA Network, the show remained on ABS-CBN. Coney began to fully produce the show through the network's production unit, where it remained until its timeslot was temporarily replaced by Sports Unlimited and later, permanently replaced by Ang Munting Paraiso, a weekly drama series also starring herself.

The show aired its final episode on December 26, 1998.
