= Gulong ng Palad (1977 TV series) =

1977–85 Philippine television drama series

- Also known as: Stand for Love
- Genre: Drama
- Based on: Gulong ng Palad (1949-1956 radio series)
- Directed by: Marcial Sanson
- Opening theme: "Gulong ng Palad" by Eugene Villaluz/Eva Eugenio
- Country of origin: Philippines
- Original language: Filipino

Production
- Running time: 30-40 minutes

Original release
- Network: BBC/City2 (1977–1979, 1983–1985); RPN (1979–1983)
- Release: 1977 – 1985

Related
- Gulong ng Palad (2006)

Gulong ng Palad (International title: Stand for Love / transl. Wheel of Fate or Wheel of Fortune) is a classic Filipino TV tearjerker started as a radio drama aired on DZRH from 1949 to 1956, created by writer Lina Flor. When it was revived as a TV soap aired on BBC/City2 from 1977 to 1979 then reverted to the same channel from 1983 to 1985 and RPN from 1979 to 1983.

== Overview ==
That was the soap that made a four-year-old child named Romnick Sarmenta an overnight star. He so immersed himself in his character as the Little Peping that televiewers empathize with him. Other members of the cast were Marian dela Riva and Ronald Corveau as Luisa and Carding (they became a real-life couple and have since separated, with Marian now happily remarried and living in the US), Caridad Sanchez as Aling Idad and Augusto Victa as Mang Tomas.

== Cast and characters ==
- Ronald Corveau as Carding
- Marianne dela Riva as Luisa
- Caridad Sanchez as Nanay Idad
- Romnick Sarmenta as Peping
- Lito Legaspi as Juancho
- Augusto Victa as Tatay Tomas
- Metring David
- Tita de Villa as Menang
- Beth Bautista as Mimi

== Remake ==
A remake was created by ABS-CBN starring Kristine Hermosa and TJ Trinidad and aired from January 9 to May 12, 2006.

== See also ==
- List of programs broadcast by Banahaw Broadcasting Corporation
- List of programs previously broadcast by Radio Philippines Network
