= Richard Reynoso =

Filipino singer (born 1969)

- Born: Richard John Pelimiano Reynoso; October 16, 1965 (age 61); Makati City, Philippines
- Occupations: Singer; actor; host
- Musical career
- Origin: Manila, Philippines
- Genre: OPM; pop; gospel
- Years active: 1986–present
- Labels: Alpha Records; Praise

Richard John Pelimiano Reynoso (born October 16, 1965) is a singer, host, and actor from Makati City, Metro Manila. He was popular in the 1990s for the songs "Hindi Ko Kaya", "Paminsan-minsan" at "Maalala Mo Pa Rin" and released six studio albums. A member of The OPM Hitmen alongside Rannie Raymundo, Chad Borja, and Renz Verano, he is also a former co-host of the Sunday noontime variety show, GMA Supershow.

== Early life ==
Reynoso grew up singing in the church. He was not good at singing in Tagalog then, as he grew up speaking and listening to English songs. His parents also had singing talents while his older brother Gary played the guitar.

== Career ==
Reynoso started competing in singing competitions in 1983, when he won first place in the Tagaytay-Menendez competition. He then joined Bagong Kampeon the following year and won third place.

In 1986, Reynoso auditioned to co-host on PTV-4's Chico-Chica. He passed the audition, besting more than 250 other applicants. On the show, he improved his singing skills in Tagalog and learned how to be comfortable on camera. He stayed on the show for a year, then hosted Date-A-Star from 1988 to 1989.

Reynoso grew in popularity. He got offers to sing theme songs on film soundtracks. Despite not having an album, in 1989, he opened for Tiffany and The Jets in two different concerts in Manila. In 1990, he finally released his first album, Puwede Ba?, which contained the single "Hindi Ko Kaya", which went on to achieve platinum status. He also held his first concert in Santiago, Isabela, where "Hindi Ko Kaya" first became popular. It was also during that year that he co-hosted the game show Family Kuwarta O Kahon with Pepe Pimentel. A year later, he left with Pimentel's blessing to co-host GMA Supershow. Soon after his first album's release, he released another album, Bawat Sandali, which contained the single "Paminsan-minsan".

By 1995, Reynoso was less active in performing, as his father had died. He took a corporate job and also worked as a marketing consultant since he had a marketing management degree from Philippine Christian University. He also worked at Praise, a recording company, which led him to composing three gospel songs and a pop album, Ako'y Narito. He still appeared occasionally on television and also held several concerts, including one held in Lebanon.

In 2012, he, Rannie Raymundo, Chad Borja, and Renz Verano formed the singing group The OPM Hitmen, which did several concerts together. In 2017, Reynoso participated in the Songs for Heroes benefit concert for the families of soldiers and policemen who fought in the siege of Marawi. He then released the compilation album Walang Kapantay: The OPM Classics in 2018 in celebration of 30 years in the entertainment industry. He was also a host of the ASOP Music Festival along with Toni Rose Gayda, and appeared in concerts throughout the 2020s.

Reynoso was also active as one of the 30 board members of the MTRCB, the government's media regulatory board, in the 2020s. In late 2023, Reynoso and two other MTRCB members gave an R-13 rating for Five Nights at Freddy's, a horror film based on a video game of the same name that has children as its target demographic.

== Personal life ==
Reynoso is married to Maria Reina Amor, a flight attendant. They have two daughters. His older brother, Gary, works as Richard's personal manager and sound adviser as well as the OPM Hitmen's production assistant, stage manager, audio man, and production manager.

Reynoso has been diagnosed with thyroid cancer and had to undergo thyroidectomy. In 2021, he and his family contracted COVID-19 despite getting fully vaccinated. He stayed in the ICU for eight days.

== Awards and nominations ==
Award	Year	Recipient	Category	Result	Ref.
Aliw Awards	2015	OPM Hitmen	Best Major Concert By a Group	Won	
PMPC Star Awards for Television	2012	ASOP Music Festival (with Toni Rose Gayda)	Best Talent Show Program Host (or Hosts)	Nominated	
PMPC Star Awards for Television	2014	ASOP Music Festival (with Toni Rose Gayda)	Best Talent Show Program Host (or Hosts)	Nominated	
PMPC Star Awards for Television	2015	ASOP Music Festival (with Toni Rose Gayda)	Best Talent Show Program Host (or Hosts)	Nominated	
PMPC Star Awards for Television	2017	ASOP Music Festival (with Toni Rose Gayda)	Best Talent Show Program Host (or Hosts)	Nominated	
PMPC Star Awards for Television	2019	ASOP Music Festival (with Toni Rose Gayda)	Best Talent Show Program Host (or Hosts)	Nominated	
PMPC Star Awards for Television	2022	ASOP Music Festival (with Toni Rose Gayda)	Best Talent Show Program Host (or Hosts)	Nominated	

== Filmography ==
=== Films ===
Year	Title	Role	Notes
1988	Pik Pak Boom	Elmer	
1988	Abot Hanggang Sukdulan	June	
1989	Imortal	Eric Racelis	
1990	Bakit Ikaw Pa Rin		
1991	Kaputol ng Isang Awit	Ricky	
1991	Darna		
1992	Kung Tayo'y Magkakalayo	Niño	
1992	Only You	Gerry	
1993	Isang Linggong Pag-ibig	Walter	
1993	Titser, Titser, I Love You	Jeffrey	
1993	Johnny Tinoso and the Proud Beauty		
1993	Lt. Col. Alejandro Yanquiling, WPD	Boy Pogi	
1993	Ayaw Ko Nang Mangarap		
1994	Laglag Barya Gang		
2005	Ang Lagusan (The Tunnel)		

=== Television ===
Year	Title	Role	Notes
1986–1987	Chico-Chica		
1987	Working Girls		
1988–1989	Date-A-Star	Himself (host)	
1988–2003	Aawitan Kita		
1990–1991	Family Kuarta o Kahon	Himself (co-host)	with Pepe Pimentel
1991–1997	GMA Supershow	Himself (co-host)	with German Moreno
2004–2006	On D'Spot	Himself (co-host)	With Beverly Verches
2011–2019	A Song of Praise Music Festival	Himself (co-host)	With Toni Rose Gayda
2011	Tunay na Buhay	Himself (guest)	
2012	Sarah G. Live	Himself (guest)	
2013	The Ryzza Mae Show	Himself (guest)	
2015	The Singing Bee	Himself (contestant)	With Jett Pangan and Gino Padilla
2017–2018	Maalaala Mo Kaya		Appeared in Seasons 25 and 26
2019	Beautiful Justice	Aldrin Ocampo	
2019–2023	Sarap, 'Di Ba?	Himself (guest)	
2019, 2024	I Can See Your Voice	Himself (guest artist)	Appeared in Seasons 2 and 5
2021	Heartful Café	Raffy	
2022–2025	Family Feud	Himself (guest contestant)	
2023	TiktoClock	Himself (guest)	
2024	Lutong Bahay	Himself	
2025	Fast Talk with Boy Abunda	Himself (guest)	
2025	Eat Bulaga!	Himself (judge)	
2025	Rainbow Rumble	Himself (contestant)	GMA Supershow reunion
2025	What Lies Beneath	Danilo	

== Discography ==
=== Albums ===
==== Studio albums ====
- Puwede Ba? (1990)
- Bawat Sandali (1991)
- Remember Me? (1992)
- Nag-aalay (1993)
- Na Naman (1996)
- Ako'y Narito (2001)
- Free Spirit (2010)
- Walang Kapantay: The OPM Classics (2018)

==== Compilation albums ====
- The Best of Richard Reynoso (1992)
- The Best of Richard Reynoso (2001)

==== Karaoke albums ====
- All-Time Hits OPM Volume 1: The Best of Rachel Alejandro & Richard Reynoso (1999)

==== Popular songs in chronological order ====
- 1989 – "Ale (Nasa Langit Na Ba Ako)?"
- 1990 – "Hindi Ko Kaya"

==== Soundtrack appearances ====
- Balweg (1987)
- Dongalo Massacre (1988)
- Hitman (1988)
- Boy Negro (1988)
- Hindi Pahuhuli ng Buhay (1989)
- Wanted: Pamilya Banal (1989)
- Hihintayin Kita sa Langit (1991)
- Kailangan Kita (1993)

=== Singles ===
- "Paminsan-minsan" (1990)
- "Hindi Ko Kaya" (1990)
- "Maaalala Mo Pa Rin" (1990)
- "Ale (Nasa Langit Na Ba Ako?)" (1990) (Bodjie Dasig cover)
- "Panakip Butas" (1991) (Hajji Alejandro cover)
- "Umaasa Pa" (1991)
- "Muli" (1991) (Ramon Jacinto cover)
- "Kahit Sino" (1990s)
- "Lumang Larawan" (1990s)
- "Tunay na Damdamin" (1996)
