= List of programs broadcast by Banahaw Broadcasting Corporation =

Below is a partial list of shows that were aired on the now-defunct Philippine television network, Banahaw Broadcasting Corporation (later renamed as City2 from 1980 to 1984) from November 4, 1973 following the declaration of Martial law by then-President Ferdinand Marcos until September 7, 1986 during the height of EDSA Revolution to make way for the return of ABS-CBN with flagship station DWWX-TV.

== Final programming ==
=== Newscasts ===
- Balita ng Linggo
- BBC Balita (1973–1980, 1984–1986)
- BBC Primetime News (1973-1976)
- City2 Balita (1980–1984)

=== Drama ===
==== Series ====
- Alindog (1976—1980)
- Amiga (1986)
- Andrea Amor (1985)
- Babae (1979–1980)
- Bata
- Blu: Bernardo, Lorenzo, Ulysses (1983–1984)
- Eliza (1973)
- Ginang Milyonarya (1973–1975)
- Gulong ng Palad (1977–1979, 1983–1985; remake 2006 by ABS-CBN)
- Ilaw ng Tahanan (1977)
- Jessie (1983–1984)
- Maria Morena
- Panata
- Pepe: Ang Munting Anghel
- Ulila

==== Anthologies ====
- Carmi (1984)
- Coney Reyes-Mumar Drama Studio
- Dulambuhay ni Rosa Vilma
- Ito Ako, Pinky (1975)
- Lovingly Yours, Helen (1984–1986)
- Maskara
- Mga Kuwentong Ginto
- Nagmamahal, Amalia (1973–1975)
- Panahon
- Sr. Santo Nino
- True Confessions ng mga Bituin (produced by LOCA Productions)
- True Story

=== Fantasy ===
- Ora Engkantada

=== Variety ===
- Ariel and Co. after Six (1974–1978)
- Big Ike's Happening...Now!
- Broadcast Campus
- Celeste
- Disco, Disco
- Hajji Atbp.
- I Am What I Am (1985–1986)
- Kalatog Pinggan
- Karnabal Dos (1980)
- Ladies and Gentlemen... (1980–1981)
- Love Lea
- Music Factory (1974)
- MV2 (The World of Music Videos)
- Odyssey 2
- Okey Sha!
- Pssssst! (1984–1986)
- Rico Baby
- Sapak na Sapak Talaga! (1982–1984)
- Seeing Stars with Joe Quirino on 2 (1983–1986)
- Tanghali sa Broadcast City
- Teen Pan Alley (1986)
- The Big, Big Show (1983–1986)
- The Pilita and Jackie Show
- Vicor TV Specials
- Video Sneak Preview
- VIP (Vilma in Person) (1980–1986)

=== Talk ===
- Coffee with Lee
- Circus
- Daigdig ng mga Misis
- Coffee with Lee Andres
- In-Daing (1979–1980)
- JQ on Cue
- Nothing But the Truth
- Tell the City
- The Star with Lolit Solis (1975–1976)

=== Comedy ===
- 2 Plus 2
- Ang Lola kong Baduy
- Apartment 153-A
- At Your Serbis, Matutina (1984)
- Banana Sundae (1985; not to be confused with the comedy gag show of the same name aired on ABS-CBN from 2015 to 2020)
- Bisoy
- Buhok-Pinoy
- Crazy Corporation
- Goin' Bananas (1985–86)
- Kuskus Balungos
- Mah Tah Tu
- Nanette Por Kilo (1986)
- Prrrt... Foul! (1980–1981)
- Tang-Tarang-Tang
- Tepok Bunot (1981–1982)

=== Game ===
- Astro Quiz Show
- Everybody Wins
- Game na Game
- Junior Kuarta o Kahon
- Kiddie Pow!
- Kuarta o Kahon (1973–1984)
- Showbiz with the Salvadors
- TV Powww

=== Infotainment ===
- Cooking It with Nora

=== Public affairs ===
- COMELEC Time
- Metro Magazine
- Progress '85 (1985)
- Progress Profile

=== Sports ===
- PBA on BBC (1975)
- PBA on Vintage Sports (1982–1983)

=== Religious ===
- Ang Iglesia ni Cristo (1983–1986)
- Jesus I Trust in You!: The 3:00 pm Prayer Habit (1985–1986)
- Sharing in the City (1978–1986)

=== Film and special presentation ===
- Bagong WXYZ Theater
- Balik-Silip
- BBC Afternoon Theater
- BBC Special of the Week
- Big Matinee Movies
- Cinema 2 (1986
- Mga Anino ng Kahapon
- Monday Suspense Theater
- Saturday Suspense Theater
- Sinehan sa Dos
- Spectacular Action on Screen (1986)
- Sunday Super Sine
- The 4:00 am Movie
- The Movie Tonight

=== Others ===
- City 2 Long
- Dos Por Dos
- Manila Files (1981)
- Peping
- Tawag-Pansin
- That's My Line
- Weekend Thriller (1986)

==== Movie trailers ====
- Movie Parade (1986)

== Acquired programming ==
=== Drama ===
==== American ====
- Bert D'Angelo/Superstar
- Logan's Run
- Moonlighting (1986)
- Police Story (1974–1975)
- Richie Rich (1986)
- Shazam! (1986)
- S.W.A.T.
- The Adventures of Rin-Tin-Tin (1986)
- The Bionic Woman
- The Fugitive
- The Twilight Zone
- The Young and the Restless

==== British ====
- Doctor Who

==== Japanese ====
- Battle Fever J (1982–1983)
- Denziman (1983–1984)
- Goggle V (1985–1986)
- Sun Vulcan (1984–1985)

=== Animated/*(Cartoon City) ===
- Birdman and the Galaxy Trio*
- Challenge of the GoBots* (1985–86)
- Groovie Goolies*
- Hans Christian Andersen
- Harlem Globetrotters
- Josie and the Pussycats
- Pac-Man (1986)
- Partridge Family 2200 AD
- She-Ra: Princess of Power* (1985–86)
- Sunshine
- The All New Popeye Hour
- The New Adventures of Superman* (1982–1983)
- The Transformers* (1986; moved to ABS-CBN)
- Wait Till Your Father Gets Home

=== Comedy ===
- Abbott and Costello
- Barney Miller
- Batman & Robin
- Chico and the Man
- Me and Maxx
- Sigmund and the Sea Monsters
- Sugar Time!
- The Bob Newhart Show
- The Carol Burnett Show
- The Facts of Life
- The Three Stooges (1986)

=== Sports ===
- Great Moments in Sports
- NBA on BBC/City2 (1978–1986)
- NFL on BBC (1973–1977)
- Tennis Superstar (1986)

=== Documentary / magazine ===
- Lifeline

=== Informative ===
- Candid Camera
- Double Deckers
- Dr. Shrinker
- Make Me Laugh
- Marlo and the Magic Movie Machine
- News from Zoos
- Sesame Street (1981–1986)
- The Electric Company (1980-2000)
- The Edison Twins (1985–1986)
- The Krofft Supershow (1979–1980)

== TV Special ==
- State of the Nation Address (September 21, 1977–July 22, 1985)

== See also ==
- Banahaw Broadcasting Corporation
- ABS-CBN
- List of Philippine television shows
