= Leila Benitez-McCollum =

Filipino-American television and radio host (1930–2020)

Leila Benitez-McCollum (October 5, 1930 – April 9, 2020) was a Filipino-born American radio and television host, presenter, journalist and broadcaster.

Benitez, who was nicknamed the "first lady of Philippine television", became a household name in the Philippines from the 1950s to the early 1970s due to a string of successful radio and television shows. She was best known for co-hosting Student Canteen, the country's first afternoon variety show, from 1959–64.

== Biography ==
Benitez was born in Quezon City, Philippines. She received her bachelor's degree in psychology from Georgetown University in Washington, D.C.

Benitez was best known for hosting the variety show Student Canteen, which began as a radio show in the late 1950s before transitioning to a popular television show on what was then called the Chronicle Broadcasting Network (CBN). According to the book, "Kapitan: Geny Lopez and the Making of ABS-CBN", Benitez was the first host to be chosen for the television show, which became "the biggest daytime program of its era".

Benitez, who became a household name across the country, co-hosted the show alongside Eddie Ilarde, Bobby Ledesma, and Pepe Pimentel, from 1959–65. In a 2003 interview, Benitez recalled the show's popularity, "Mga estudyante (lit. students), they used to come in. This was their noon break, lunch hour. And it became so big and so popular that it became a big, live amateur show."

Benitez also hosted talk shows, including Darigold Jamboree and The Leila Benitez Celebrity Hour, where her guests included international stars such as Harry Belafonte, Ann-Margret, and Neil Sedaka.

Benitez was visiting the United States when martial law was declared by then-President Ferdinand Marcos in 1972, resulting, among other things, in the cancellation of her television shows. With her shows cancelled, Benitez decided to permanently remain in the United States, rather than returning to the Philippines under Marcos. She soon joined the Voice of America as an anchor for its Asia Pacific broadcasts. She also raised her children in the United States.

In 2003, Benitez-McCollum made her final visit to the Philippines, where she was honored by her former employer, ABS-CBN, during the 50th anniversary celebration of the television network. She was also honored by ABS-CBN during the network's 60th anniversary in 2013.

Benitez-McCollum, who lived in New York, contracted COVID-19 at a rehabilitation center. She was admitted to the hospital, where she tested positive for coronavirus. Leila Benitez-McCollum died from COVID-19 at Mount Sinai Hospital in Manhattan, New York City, on April 8, 2020, at age 89, during the COVID-19 pandemic in New York City.

She was survived by her three sons—Gerry and Gil (born during her first marriage to Gerardo "Grau" Roses), and Martin (who was born during her marriage to her second husband, Mervyn Simpson) - as well as four grandchildren. Benitez was predeceased by her third husband, Donald McCollum, the founder of the first television marketing research company in the United States. They had been married for 38 years before his death.

She was the second major Filipino entertainment figure to die from COVID-19, following the passing of actor Menggie Cobarrubias in March.
