= Eddie Ilarde =

Filipino politician, radio, and television host (1934–2020)

The Honorable Edgar Ilarde
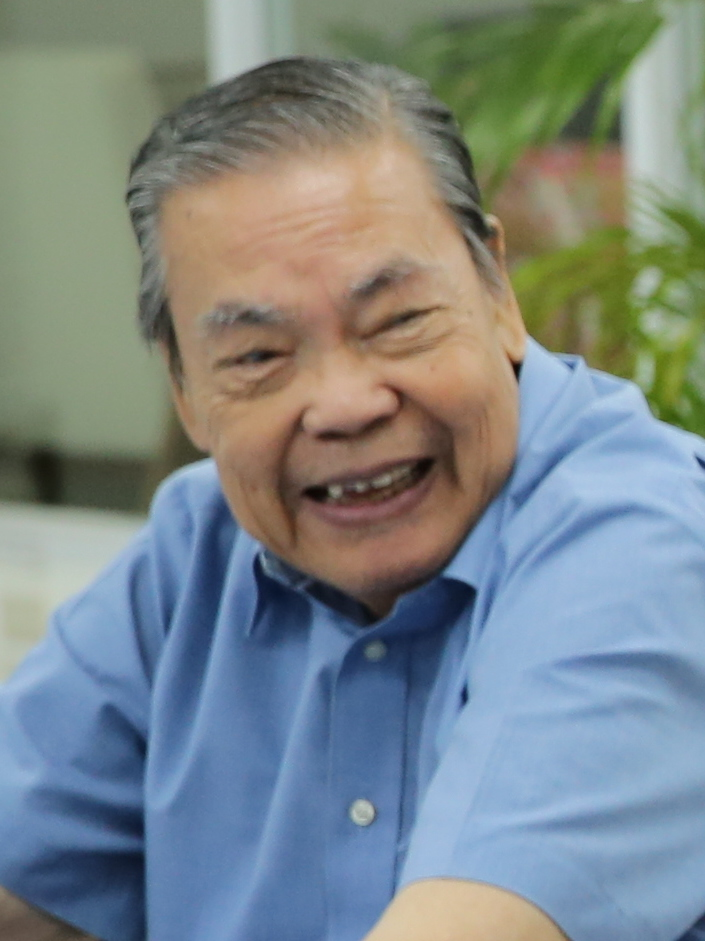
- Ilarde in January 2019

Senator of the Philippines
- In office January 24, 1972 – September 23, 1972

Member of the Philippine House of Representatives from Rizal's 1st congressional district
- In office December 30, 1965 – December 30, 1969
- Preceded by: Rufino D. Antonio
- Succeeded by: Neptali A. Gonzales

Mambabatas Pambansa (Assemblyman) for Region IV (Metro Manila)
- In office June 12, 1978 – June 5, 1984

Member of the Pasay City Council
- In office December 30, 1963 – December 30, 1965

Personal details
- Born: Edgar Ubalde Ilarde; August 25, 1934 Iriga, Camarines Sur, Philippine Islands
- Died: August 4, 2020 (aged 85) Makati, Philippines
- Resting place: National Shrine of the Sacred Heart, Makati
- Party: Independent (1965–1969; 1984–1987, 1988–1992; 2004–2020)
- Other political affiliations: Liberal (1965; 1969–1972); KBL (1978–1984); UNIDO (1987–1988); Nacionalista (1992–2004)
- Spouse: Sylvia Berenguer Arrastia
- Children: 7
- Education: Far Eastern University (AB)
- Profession: Radio and television host

Edgar "Eddie" Ubalde Ilarde (August 25, 1934 – August 4, 2020) was a Filipino politician, public servant, and radio and television host. On radio and television, he hosted programs such as Kahapon Lamang, Student Canteen and Darigold Jamboree.

His first position as a public servant was being a councilor of Pasay in the early '60s. He was also elected for one term in the Philippine Senate. He also served one term respectively as a congressman and as an Assemblyman of the Interim Batasang Pambansa.

== Early life ==
Ilarde was born in Iriga, Camarines Sur. He moved to Manila after high school, where worked as a bootblack and a newspaper vendor until college. He obtained his bachelor's degree in journalism from Far Eastern University.

== Media personality ==
While in college, he had won in an oratorical contest and drew the notice of a radio executive. He found work in various radio stations in Manila, and soon was among the most popular radio hosts of the 1950s. His shows during that period aired over DZBB, DZRH and the Lopez-owned DZXL. From his advice program Kahapon Lamang were formed the popular catchphrases Dear Kuya Eddie (later, the title of one of Ilarde's subsequent programs) and Napakasakit, Kuya Eddie ("Very painful, Brother Eddie"; later became the title of the theme song performed by Roel Cortez).

Ilarde co-hosted on DZXL with Bobby Ledesma and Leila Benitez the noontime variety show Student Canteen, which they would continue to host when the program was brought to television in 1958.

== Political career ==
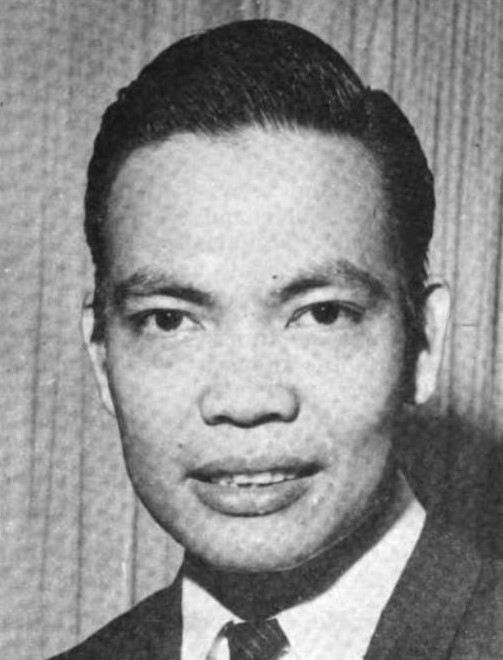
Representative Ilarde's official portrait during the 6th Congress.

Ilarde first ventured into politics in 1963 when he was elected as councilor of Pasay. Two years later, he defeated incumbent congressman Rufino Antonio and was elected to the House of Representatives representing Rizal's 1st district, which then consisted most of what is now Metro Manila. During his service in the 6th Congress, Ilarde served as Chairperson of the Committee on Fishing Industries.

Even though an Independent, Ilarde found himself in frequent agreement with the Liberal Party, which included him in its senatorial slate for the 1969 elections. With re-electionist President Ferdinand Marcos successfully leading the Nacionalista Party slate, Ilarde lost the Senate race, falling 10th place out of the 8 seats up for election with over 300,000 votes shy of election to the Senate. Having given up his seat in the House to run for the Senate, Ilarde ran again for the Senate under the Liberal Party banner in the 1971 elections. Ilarde, along with the other members of his party's senatorial ticket, was injured in the bombing at Plaza Miranda of their final political rally.

While recuperating from his injuries, Ilarde and five (5) of his party-mates were elected to the eight (8) Senate vacancies. Ilarde assumed office as a Senator of the 7th Congress in January 1972. However, his term was interrupted when Congress was closed in September of that year following the declaration of martial law by President Marcos.

By 1978, Ilarde had allied himself with President Marcos. Running under the Marcos' political party Kilusang Bagong Lipunan (or the New Society Movement), Ilarde won election to the Interim Batasang Pambansa as an Assemblyman representing Region IV (Metro Manila). He served until 1984. While at the Batasan, he drew attention for his proposal to rename the country "Maharlika", an advocacy which he promoted until his death.

== Later life ==
He ran for mayor of Makati in 1980 under the ruling Kilusang Bagong Lipunan and in 1988 under the United Nationalist Democratic Organization, but lost to Nemesio Yabut and Jejomar Binay, respectively.

During the 1992 Philippine senate election, Ilarde ran for senator under the Nacionalista Party of the Laurel-Kalaw ticket for the presidency and vice-presidency, respectively. However, he placed 43rd, failing to secure one of the 24 seats up for election.

In 2004, Ilarde ran for a Senate seat as an independent candidate, but managed to place only 33rd, making him miss the cut for the 12 seats up for election.

Ilarde was honored to be one of PMPC Star Awards for Television's Lifetime Achievement Awardees.

Ilarde was the founder and chairman of the Maharlika Foundation For National Transformation Inc., and the Golden Eagles Society International Inc. The latter is an organization of senior citizens in the Philippines. He was assisted in his endeavors by his loyal friends - Ariston "Aris" Bautista and Ferdie Pasion. He also hosted radio program Kahapon Lamang that airs over DZBB (owned and operated by GMA Network Inc.) every Saturday from 1:30 p.m. to 2:30 p.m.

== Death ==
Ilarde died on August 4, 2020, exactly three weeks shy of his 86th birthday, at the age of 85 at his home in Makati. His family clarified that his death was due to natural causes, which is not related to ongoing COVID-19 pandemic and that his remains would be cremated. His death came four months after his original Student Canteen female co-host, Leila Benitez-McCollum, died on April 9, 2020. His remains were inurned at the National Shrine of the Sacred Heart in Makati.

== Filmography ==
=== Television ===
- The Eddie Ilarde Show (ABS-CBN, 1959–1962)
- Darigold Jamboree (MBC)
- Swerte sa Siyete (GMA Network, 1976–1986)
- Student Canteen (ABS-CBN, 1958–1965; GMA Network, 1975–1986; RPN, 1989–1990)
- Kahapon Lamang (GMA Network, 1976–1986)
- Napakasakit, Kuya Eddie (ABS-CBN, 1986–1988)
- Alas Dose sa Trese (IBC, 1999–2000)

=== Film ===
- Dear Eddie (Premiere Entertainment Productions, 1963)
- Napakasakit, Kuya Eddie the Movie (Special People Productions, 1986) - host cameo
- Omeng Satanasia (RVQ Productions, 1977) - lunch show host

=== Radio ===
- Napakasakit, Kuya Eddie (DZBB-AM, 1973–1995)
- Kahapon Lamang (DZBB-AM, 1975–1998, 2008–2020)

== Notes ==
House of Representatives of the Philippines
Preceded by Rufino Antonio	Representative, 1st District of Rizal; 1965 – 1969	Succeeded by Neptali Gonzales
