= ASOP Music Festival =

Annual music festival in the Philippines

A Song of Praise (ASOP) Music Festival
- Genre: Pop, Jazz, Ballad, Classical, Christian Music, Contemporary Christian Music, Reggae, Country, Pop rock, Rock, Orchestra
- Dates: First Three Sundays of the Month (Weekly Finals); Fourth Sunday of the Month (Monthly Finals); Second Sunday or Monday of November (Grand Finals)
- Locations: La Verdad Christian College, Caloocan, Philippines (Weekly and Monthly Finals); New Frontier Theater, Quezon City, Philippines (Grand Finals)
- Years active: 2011–2019
- Website: Official Website

The ASOP (A Song of Praise) Music Festival is an annual music festival held in Metro Manila, Philippines. Basically a songwriting competition, it is the only gospel music television program in the country. An original concept of Bro. Eli Soriano and Daniel Razon aiming to bring back praise songs to the public, it started in 2004 as a music competition inside the Members Church of God International but was later opened to the general public in 2011. The music festival also discourages rap and metal music entries.

The program airs weekly on UNTV every Sunday night holding weekly and monthly eliminations. The show is hosted by Toni Rose Gayda and balladeer Richard Reynoso. For the first 6 years (2012–2017), the Grand Finals were held in Smart Araneta Coliseum, Quezon City. Starting in 2018, the Finals are held in nearby New Frontier Theater, Quezon City. Since 2015, entries that won from the monthly eliminations of November of the current year to October of the following year are included in the Grand Finals Night.

On its third year, the multi-awarded Filipino actor and film director, Cesar Montano and Filipina actress, Lilet joined the competition with their compositions entitled Pagpupuring Walang Hanggan (Eternal Praise), and You Are Lord of All, respectively.

ASOP Music Festival was crowned the Best Talent Search Program of the 29th PMPC Star Awards for Television. As announced by Daniel Razon on the Year 7 Grand Finals, starting Year 8, the cash prize will be ₱800,000 for the champion, and a yearly increment of ₱100,000 will be added to the grand prize.

== Hosts ==
- Toni Rose Gayda (2011–2019)
- Richard Reynoso (2011–2019)

== Grand Winners ==
Year	Date	Composer(s)	Song	Interpreter(s)	Prize	Ref.
1	September 24, 2012	Anton Estrella Jr.	Purihin Mo Ang Dios Oh Pilipinas (Praise God, Oh Philippines)	Gail Blanco	₱500,000	
2	September 9, 2013	Boy Christopher Ramos Jr.	Ikaw (You)	Jonalyn Viray	₱500,000	
3	September 23, 2014	Louise Lyle Robles	May Awa ang Dios (There is Mercy in God)	Beverly Caimen	₱500,000	
4	October 13, 2015	Christian Malinias	Kung Pag-ibig Mo'y Ulan (If Your Love is Rain)	Leah Patricio	₱500,000	
5	November 7, 2016	Noemi Ocio	Kumapit Ka Lang (Just Hold On)	Mela	₱500,000	
6	November 13, 2017	Carlo David	Dahil Sa Iyo (Because of You)	Jay R	₱500,000	
7	November 11, 2018	John Paul Salazar	Tugtog (Play)	Bradz	₱500,000	
8	November 10, 2019	Carlo David	Sa 'Di Mabilang Na Tala (In the Countless Stars)	Gidget Dela Llana	₱800,000	
ASOP Music Festival went on hiatus after the Year 8 Grand Finals, probably due to proposed format changes in the Year 8 Finals, and eventually due to the quarantine caused by the COVID-19 pandemic.

== Events ==
NOTE: Tagalog song titles presented in this table are provided with English translations.

Year	Lineup	Winners	Date	Location
2012	I Will Still Praise You; The Sweetest Moment; Sa Iyo Aking Ama (To You, Father); Purihin Ka Ng Aking Luha (My Tears Shall Praise You); Pupurihin Ka Hanggang sa Kailanman (I Will Praise You Until Eternity); Pag-ibig ay Dios (God is Love); Reasons to Believe; Sa ‘Yo (For You); Puso Kong Nabuksan (My Enlightened Heart); Be My Everything; Purihin Mo Ang Dios, Oh Pilipinas (Praise God, Oh Philippines); Ikaw Ang Ngayon Bukas at Kailanman (You are the Now, Tomorrow and Forever)	Champion: Purihin Mo Ang Dios Oh Pilipinas; First Runner Up: Pupurihin Ka Hanggang Sa Kailanman (I Will Praise You Until Forevermore); Second Runner Up: Puso Kong Nabuksan; Third Runner Up: Reasons To Believe; Best Interpreter: Nikki Valdez (Pupurihin Ka Hanggang sa Kailanman); People's Choice: Pag-ibig ay Dios	September 24, 2012	Araneta Coliseum, Quezon City, Philippines
2013	You'll See Miracles; Sa Iyo Lamang (In You Alone); Ikaw Lamang ang Pupurihin (Only You Will Be Praised); Dakila Ka (You Are Great); Lagi Kang Nariyan (You Are Always There); You're My God; Awit ng mga Awit (Song of Songs); Iniibig Kita Buong Puso at Kaluluwa (I Love You With All My Heart and Soul); Ikaw (You); Hallelujah; I Am Grateful; Salamat sa Iyo (Thanks To You)	Champion: Ikaw; First Runner Up: I Am Grateful; Second Runner Up: Lagi Kang Nariyan; Third Runner Up: You'll See Miracles; Best Interpreter: Jona (Ikaw)	September 9, 2013	Araneta Coliseum, Quezon City, Philippines
2014	Ikaw Ang Tangi Kong Minamahal (You're the Only One I Love); Biyaya (Grace); Tanging Gabay (Special Guide); Kislap (Shimmer); God will Win Our Fight; May Awa ang Dios (There is Mercy in God); You are Lord of All; Panginoon Kay Buti Mo (Lord, How Good You Are); Hangga’t May Tinig Ako (As Long As I Have My Voice); Awit ng Puso Ko (My Heart's Song); Pagpupuring Walang Hanggan (Eternal Praise); Sa Bawat Araw (In Every Day)	Champion: May Awa ang Dios (God's Mercy); First Runner Up: Sa Bawat Araw (In Each Day); Second Runner Up: Tanging Gabay; Third Runner Up: Biyaya; People's Choice Award: Hangga't May Tinig Ako; Best Interpreter: Beverly Caimen (May Awa ang Dios)	September 23, 2014	Araneta Coliseum, Quezon City, Philippines
2015	Dinggin Mo Oh Dios (Listen, O God); Alabok (Dust); Sabik Sa Iyo (I'm Eager For You); Walang Hanggan (Forever); Jesus, I Love You; Mahal Mo Ako (You Love Me); Kung Pag-Ibig Mo'y Ulan (If Your Love is Rain); Dakila Ka, Ama (Father, You are Great); Ikaw Na Lang Mag-Drive ng Buhay Ko (Only You Will Drive My Life); Pahintulutan Mo (Please Let Him Do); Salamat Po, Ama (Thank You, Father); Pakamamahalin Din Kita, O Dios (I'll Also Cherish You, O God)	Champion: Kung Pag-Ibig Mo'y Ulan; First Runner Up: Pakamamahalin Din Kita; Second Runner Up: Jesus, I Love You; Third Runner Up: Pahintulutan Mo; Best Interpreter: Leah Patricio (Kung Pag-Ibig Mo'y Ulan); People's Choice: Dakila Ka, Ama; Best Music Video: Sabik sa’Yo	October 13, 2015	Araneta Coliseum, Quezon City, Philippines
2016	God Will Always Make A Way; Tapat Mong Pangako (Your Faithful Promise); Ikaw Lamang (Only You); Ikaw Pala (It's Really You); Tanging Ligaya (Only Rewarding); Ang Iyong Pangalan (Your Name); Patawarin Mo Ako (Please Forgive Me); Araw At Ulan (Sun and Rain); Pag-ibig Ka, Oh Dios (You are the Love, O God); Mula Sa Aking Puso (From My Heart); Kumapit Ka Lang (Just Hold On); You Stood By Me	Champion: Kumapit Ka Lang (Just Hold On); First Runner Up: God Will Always Make A Way; Second Runner Up: Araw At Ulan (Sun and Rain); Third Runner Up: You Stood By Me & Mula Sa Aking Puso (From My Heart); People's Choice: Ikaw Lamang (Only You); Best Interpreter: Bugoy Drilon and Jason Fernandez	November 7, 2016	Araneta Coliseum, Quezon City, Philippines
2017	Gabundok Man; Sumasamba Sa 'Yo (Worshipping You); Carry On; Ikaw Ang Aking Dios (You Are My God); Sapat Na Ba (Is It Enough); Dahil Sa 'Yo (Because of You); Wala Kang Katulad (There Is No Other); Ikaw Panginoon (You, Lord); If You Believe; You Are All I Need; Hallelujah To The One; Beside Your Heart	Champion: Dahil Sa 'Yo; First Runner Up: You're All I Need; Second Runner Up: Ikaw Ang Aking Dios; Third Runner Up: Hallelujah To The One; People's Choice: Carry On; Best Interpreter: Jay R	November 13, 2017	Araneta Coliseum, Quezon City, Philippines

=== Year 7 (2017–2018) ===
- Date: November 11, 2018
- Venue: New Frontier Theater, Araneta Center, Cubao, Quezon City
- Judges: Rannie Raymundo, Boy Christopher Ramos, Mon Del Rosario, Pat Castillo, Jose Javier Reyes, and Fides Cuyugan-Asensio
- Hosts: Richard Reynoso and Toni Rose Gayda

The ASOP Year 7 Grand Finals night was held at the New Frontier Theater, Cubao, Quezon City on November 11, 2018, and had its simultaneous TV premiere at UNTV and online premiere at Youtube on December 30, 2018.

"Tugtog", a song entry composed by John Paul Salazar and interpreted by Bradz was named as the grand champion among 12 finalists. Blind composer Jeffrey Lim won the special award Bro. Eli Soriano's Choice for the song "Hiling", while LJ Manzano's "Banal Mong Salita" bagged the People's Choice Award. Cello Nuñez was hailed as the Best Interpreter.

Wish 107.5 products The Wishfuls performed at the event.

After the Grand Finals, "Banal Mong Salita" was used as the soundtrack of Ang Dating Daan's 38th anniversary short film "Banal Na Salita" (Holy Word).

Result	Song	Composer(s)	Interpreter(s)	Prize
—	Pagbabalik (Return)	Joel Jabelosa	Marcelito Pomoy	₱20,000
—	Hiling (Wish)	Jeffrey Lim	Plethora	₱20,000
—	Makikita Kita (I'll See You)	Joyner Dizon	Dan Billano	₱20,000
—	'Wag Kang Bibitiw (Don't Give Up)	Oliver Narag	Jessa Mae Gabon	₱20,000
3rd Runner-up	'Di na 'ko Aawit (I Won't Sing)	Rommel Gojo	Hans Dimayuga	₱200,000
—	Binago Mo Ako (You Changed Me)	Jett Villareal	Daryl Ong	₱20,000
—	Magpatuloy sa Mabuting Paggawa (Continue Doing Good Things)	Febs Colibao	Ato Arman	₱20,000
2nd Runner-up	God is with Us	Emmanuel Lipio Jr.	Cello Nuñez	₱250,000
—	Salamat Panginoon (Thank You Lord)	Rex Torremoro and Elmar Jan Bolaño	Mark Carpio	₱20,000
Grand Champion	Tugtog (Play)	John Paul Salazar	Bradz	₱500,000
—	Banal Mong Salita (Your Sacred Word)	LJ Manzano	Mark Michael Garcia	₱20,000
1st Runner-up	Isang Milyong Pasasalamat (A Million Thanks)	Edward Salde	Leah Patricio	₱300,000

Special Awards:

Award	Composer(s)	Song	Interpreter(s)	Prize
Best Interpreter	Emmanuel Lipio Jr.	God is with Us	Cello Nuñez	₱50,000
People's Choice	LJ Manzano	Banal Mong Salita	Mark Michael Garcia	₱50,000
Bro. Eli Soriano's Choice	Jeffrey Lim	Hiling	Plethora	₱200,000

=== Year 8 (2018–2019) ===
The eighth year of competition included entries from November 2018 to October 2019 episodes. As announced during the Year 7 Grand Finals, the grand prize for Year 8 is raised from ₱500,000 to ₱800,000.

==== Qualification ====
Month	Song of the Month	Composer(s)	Origin	Interpreter(s)
November 2018	O Ama (Oh Father)	Jhoter Jone Villan	Taguig	Tabitha Caro*
December 2018	Alay Ko (My Offering)	Maddonna Rosas and Pau Ortiz		Brenan Espartinez
January 2019	Ikaw Ay Ikaw (You are You)	Vanduane Badua	Baguio, Benguet	Audrey Malaiba*
February 2019	Don't Give Up †	Cherry Labating	Iloilo	Jennifer Maravilla*
March 2019	Dios ng Katotohanan (God of the Truth)	Darrell Joseph Villanueva	Pasay	Niña Espinosa
April 2019	Pupurihin Kita (I'll Praise You)	Chris Givenchi Edejer	Davao City, Davao del Sur	Nino Alejandro*
May 2019	Libo-libong Tala (Thousands of Stars) †‡	Carlo David		Rhap Salazar* / Gidget Dela Llana
June 2019	You Are Wonderful	Franz Loren Bigcas	Bohol	Mark Laygo
July 2019	God Has His Purpose	Lambert Reyes Jr. and Roman Cundangan	Jeddah, Saudi Arabia and Bulacan	Ethan Loukas
August 2019	Sagwan (Paddle) †	Aiza Narag	Valenzuela City	Louie Anne Culala
September 2019	Ako ay Tunay na Magtatagumpay (I Will Truly Succeed)	Shaun Billones	Jakarta, Indonesia	Aby Singson*
October 2019	Ulap (Cloud) ‡	Rinz Ruiz	Marilao, Bulacan	Vanz Bonaobra

Notes

1. An asterisk (*) denotes a change of interpreter for the Grand Finals.
2. A dagger (†) denotes a "Producer's Pick" weekly winner.
3. A double dagger (‡) denotes a change of song title for the Grand Finals.
4. "Don't Give Up" reached the November 2018 Monthly Finals and lost, but was recalled for a February 2019 "Producer's Pick" episode.
5. "Libo-libong Tala" reached the March 2019 Monthly Finals and lost, but was recalled for a May 2019 "Producer's Pick" episode. Rhap Salazar performed the song on May Weekly Finals, while Gidget Dela Llana sang on the May Monthly Finals and also the Grand Finals. The title was changed to "Sa 'Di Mabilang Na Tala" for the Grand Finals.
6. "Sagwan" reached the July 2019 Monthly Finals and lost, but was recalled for an August 2019 "Producer's Pick" episode.
7. The title of "Ulap" was changed to "Tahan Na" for the Grand Finals.

==== Results ====
- Date: November 10, 2019
- Venue: New Frontier Theater, Araneta City, Cubao, Quezon City
- Judges: Mon Del Rosario, Miguel Benjamin of Ben&Ben, Boboy Garovillo, Dr. Arnel De Pano, Jackie Lou Blanco, Lani Misalucha, Prof. Felipe De Leon Jr.
- Hosts: Richard Reynoso and Toni Rose Gayda

The ASOP Year 8 Grand Finals night was held at the New Frontier Theater, Cubao, Quezon City on November 10, 2019.

"Sa 'Di Mabilang Na Tala", a song entry composed by Carlo David and interpreted by Gidget Dela Llana, was named as the grand champion among 12 finalists, and also bagged the People's Choice Award. David became the first and only two-time winner in the program's history.

Ethan Loukas was hailed as the Best Interpreter, while Bro. Eli Soriano's Choice are the regulars of the show, hosts Richard Reynoso and Toni Rose Gayda, and resident judge Mon Del Rosario.

Wish 107.5 Wishcovery winners Princess Sevillena, Rhea Basco, Tawag ng Tanghalan finalist Violeta Bayawa, Plethora, Ace Bartolome and Carmela Ariola of The Wishfuls, Jason Dy, Leah Patricio, and Bradz performed at the event.

Result	Song	Composer(s)	Interpreter(s)	Prize	Score
—	Pupurihin Kita (I'll Praise You)	Chris Givenchi Edejer	Gerald Santos	₱20,000	—
2nd Runner-up	Sagwan (Paddle)	Aiza Narag	Louie Anne Culala	₱250,000	90.29%
—	You Are Wonderful	Franz Loren Bigcas	Mark Laygo	₱20,000	—
—	Dios ng Katotohanan (God of the Truth)	Darrell Joseph Villanueva	Niña Espinosa	₱20,000	—
Grand Champion	Sa 'Di Mabilang Na Tala (In the Countless Stars)	Carlo David	Gidget Dela Llana	₱800,000	93.86%
—	O Ama (Oh Father)	Jhoter Jone Villan	Cha-Cha Cañete	₱20,000	—
—	Alay Ko (My Offering)	Maddonna Rosas and Pau Ortiz	Brenan Espartinez	₱20,000	—
—	Ako ay Tunay na Magtatagumpay (I Will Truly Succeed)	Shaun Billones	Kimberly Baluzo	₱20,000	—
—	God Has His Purpose	Lambert Reyes Jr. and Roman Cundangan	Ethan Loukas	₱20,000	—
—	Ikaw Ay Ikaw (You are You)	Vanduane Badua	Radha Cuadrado	₱20,000	—
1st Runner-up	Tahan Na (Hold On)	Rinz Ruiz	Vanz Bonaobra	₱300,000	90.71%
3rd Runner-up	Don't Give Up	Cherry Labating	Jinky Vidal	₱200,000	89.29%

Special Awards:

Award	Composer(s)	Song	Interpreter(s)	Prize
Best Interpreter	Lambert Reyes Jr. and Roman Cundangan	God Has His Purpose	Ethan Loukas	₱50,000
People's Choice	Carlo David	Sa 'Di Mabilang Na Tala	Gidget Dela Llana	₱50,000
Bro. Eli Soriano's Choice	Mon Del Rosario, Richard Reynoso and Toni Rose Gayda			₱210,000 (₱70,000 each)

== Awards and recognition ==
The ASOP 2012 commemorative album is awarded as Inspirational Album of the Year in the 5th PMPC Star Awards for Music in Manila, Philippines.

Year	Association	Category	Nominee(s)	Result
2012	PMPC Star Awards for Television	Best Talent Search Program	ASOP (A Song Of Praise) Music Festival	Nominated
2012	PMPC Star Awards for Television	Best Talent Search Program Host(s)	Richard Reynoso and Toni Rose Gayda	Nominated
2012	AnakTV	AnakTV Seal Award	ASOP (A Song Of Praise) Music Festival	Awarded
2013	PMPC Star Awards for Music	Inspirational Album of the Year	ASOP, A Song of Praise	Won
2013	AnakTV	AnakTV Seal Award	ASOP (A Song Of Praise) Music Festival	Awarded
2013	AnakTV	AnakTV Seal Award	A Song of Praise - TV Special (2012 Grand Finals Night)	Awarded
2014	PMPC Star Awards for Television	Best Talent Search Program	ASOP (A Song Of Praise) Music Festival	Nominated
2014	PMPC Star Awards for Television	Best Talent Search Program Host(s)	Richard Reynoso and Toni Rose Gayda	Nominated
2014	AnakTV	AnakTV Seal Award	ASOP (A Song Of Praise) Music Festival	Awarded
2015	PMPC Star Awards for Television	Best Talent Search Program	ASOP (A Song Of Praise) Music Festival	Won
2015	PMPC Star Awards for Television	Best Talent Search Program Host(s)	Richard Reynoso and Toni Rose Gayda	Nominated
2015	AnakTV	AnakTV Seal Award	ASOP (A Song Of Praise) Music Festival	Awarded
2016	AnakTV	AnakTV Seal Award	ASOP (A Song Of Praise) Music Festival	Awarded
2016	AnakTV	AnakTV Seal Award	ASOP By Request	Awarded
2017	31st PMPC Star Awards for Television	Best Talent Search Program	ASOP (A Song Of Praise) Music Festival	Won
2017	AnakTV	AnakTV Seal Award	ASOP (A Song Of Praise) Music Festival	Awarded

== See also ==
- Ang Dating Daan
- Members Church of God International
- Radyo La Verdad 1350
- UNTV News & Rescue
- Wish 107.5
