= Toni Rose Gayda =

Filipina actress

- Born: Toni Rose Danon Gayda
- Occupations: Television host, actress
- Years active: 1986–present
- Spouse: Moonie Lim (separated)
- Children: 2
- Mother: Rosa Rosal
- Relatives: William Thio (nephew)

Toni Rose Danon Gayda is a Filipino television personality and actress. She is the daughter of the Philippine National Red Cross governor, public servant, and movie star Rosa Rosal (1928–2025), and American pilot Walter Gayda. She is of Filipino, Egyptian, French, and Polish-American descent (surname Gayda is Polish).

Gayda, alongside Richard Reynoso, is currently a host of A Song of Praise Music Festival on UNTV, the only gospel music television program in the Philippines.

== Early and personal life ==
Toni Rose Gayda was born to her mother, Rosa Rosal, an actress and humanitarian, and father Walter Gayda, an American pilot. Gayda married to Moonie Lim, and they have two sons (Edward James and Edward John). They are separated. In March 2010, her son Edward James (born 1985), died in a freak accident when he fell from the Lim's family owned Pinnacle Condominium's 4th floor in Mandaluyong. His mother, Gayda donated Edward's corneas to the Eye Bank of the Philippines at the time of his death. The beneficiaries are John, a computer engineer, and Danny, a retired military agent.

== Filmography ==
=== Television ===
| Year | Title | Role |
|---|---|---|
| 1978–1980 | GMA Supershow | Host |
| 1987–1988 | Shades | Host / performer |
| 1986–1993 | It's a Real Deal | Host |
| 1986–1993 | Lunch Date | Host |
| 1990 | Kapwa Ko Mahal Ko | Host |
| 1995 | Shopping Bug | Host |
| 1995–1996 | Okay Ka, Fairy Ko! | Herself |
| 1995–2014 | Eat Bulaga! | Host |
| 1997–2000 | Skin Deep | Host |
| 1999 | Maynila | Various |
| 2000 | 1 for 3 | Herself |
| 2001 | Daddy Di Do Du | Herself |
| 2004–2007 | Bahay Mo Ba 'To? | Rosing / Rosita |
| 2008 | Talentadong Pinoy | Celebrity judge |
| 2009 | Show Me Da Manny | Herself |
| 2010 | Pepito Manaloto | Herself |
| 2011–2019 | ASOP Music Festival | Host |
| 2023 | Pepito Manaloto: Tuloy ang Kuwento: Huling Hiling | Granny / Lola Tessie |
| 2024 | Family Feud: Lunch Date vs Neocolours | Self / Contestant - Lunch Date |
| 2025 | Family Feud: Classic Hosts | Self / Contestant - Rock & Rose |
| 2026 | Family Feud: Showbiz Veterans | Self / Contestant - Showbiz Royalty |
| 2026 | Eat Bulaga!: The Age is Right | Self / Contestant - The Age is Right Agent |
