= Marianne dela Riva =

Filipino actress and comedian

- Born: December 14, 1956 (age 69); Daet, Camarines Norte, Philippines
- Other names: Marianne De La Riva
- Occupations: Actress, Television series
- Years active: 1973–2006
- Spouse(s): Ronald Corveau (div.; 2 daughters); Oscar Ortiz

Marianne dela Riva (born December 14, 1956), is a Filipino actress, popularly known as Luisa in Gulong ng Palad, a classic TV series in the Philippines aired in 1977. She was the favorite leading lady of action king Fernando Poe, Jr. and other action stars in the 1980s.

== Career ==
It was fashion designer Pitoy Moreno who discovered Marianne at the age of 16. She used to be one of his models. She became one of Manila's Prettiest. She became a fashion model and then became a print model. She appeared in more than 75 movies and television shows since she started as leading lady of Cocoy Laurel in 1973 movie Love Song. She was nominated as Best Supporting Actress 1975 FAMAS Award for Krimen: Kayo Ang Humatol (1974).

She used to be the most visible actress in the action movie genre. In the 1980s, Marianne would come into mind as the leading lady of action stars. Fernando Poe, Jr. openly admitted that Marianne his favorite leading lady. Marianne did movies with action stars: Dante Varona in Carding Estrabel: Tirador ng Malabon (1980), Rey Malonzo in Kumander .45 (1982), Lito Lapid in Zigomar (1984), Rudy Fernandez in Anak ng Tondo (1985), Phillip Salvador in Delima Gang (1989), Anthony Alonzo in Irampa si Mediavillo (1990), and Eddie Garcia in Mayor Latigo (1991), among others. She did much action movies with Fernando Poe, Jr.

On television made the characters of Marianne as Luisa, Ronald Corveau as Carding, Caridad Sanchez as Aling Idad, Romnick Sarmenta as Peping, Beth Bautista as Mimi, in 1977 TV series Gulong ng Palad, a great love story of Luisa & Carding, rolled over to television via Banahaw Broadcasting Network, the Philippine TV's first soap opera made household names, ended in 1985. ABS-CBN produced in 2006 remake of Gulong ng Palad topbilled by Kristine Hermosa and TJ Trinidad.

Marianne's last project was the television remake of Panday, which began airing in December 2005. She was Flavio's wife in Panday IV (the original Panday played by FPJ), which hit the theaters in 1984.

== Selected filmography ==
=== Television ===
- Gulong ng Palad (BBC/RPN Soap Opera) (1977–1985)
- Ipaglaban Mo (1992–1999)
- Star Drama Theater Presents: Angelika
- GMA Telesine Special
- Calvento Files (1996–1998)
- Wansapanataym (1997–2005)
- Esperanza (1997–1999)
- Halik sa Apoy (1998–1999)
- Maalaala Mo Kaya (1998–2005)
- Sana ay Ikaw na Nga (2001–2003)
- Kung Mawawala Ka (2002–2003)
- Basta't Kasama Kita (2003–2004)
- Mga Anghel na Walang Langit (2005–2006)
- Ang Panday (2005–2006)

=== Film ===
- Love Song (1973)
- Ibilanggo Si... Cavite Boy (1974)
- Ang Leon at ang Daga (1975)
- Alakdang Gubat (1976)
- Babaing Hiwalay sa Asawa (1976)
- Tutubing Kalabaw Tutubing Karayom (1977)
- Valentin Labrador (1977)
- Ang Lalaki, ang Alamat, ang Baril (1978)
- Gusting Pusa (1978)
- Joe Quintero (1978)
- Drigo Garotte: Jai Alai King (1978)
- Showdown of Martial Arts (1979)
- Batang Salabusab (1979)
- Maynila 1970: Panganib Araw at Gabi (1979)
- Carding Estrabel: Tirador ng Malabon (1980)
- Bandido sa Sapang Bato (1981)
- Kumander Elpidio Paclibar (1982)
- Pepeng Kaliwete (1982)
- Anak ng Tulisan (1982)
- Kumander .45 (1982)
- Daniel Bartolo ng Sapang Bato (1982)
- Ang Krus sa Monte Piedra (1983)
- Isang Bala Ka Lang! (1983)
- MPD Manhunt Parulan! (1983)
- Baril at Balisong (1983)
- Zigomar (1984)
- Sampaloc 1963 (1984)
- Hatulan si Baby Angustia (1984)
- Ang Panday IV: Ika-Apat Na Aklat (1984)
- Muntinlupa (1984)
- Sino si Victor Lopez? (1985)
- Manila Gang War (1985)
- Isa-Isa Lang! (1985)
- Anak ng Tondo (1985)
- Victor Lopez ng Bangkusay (1986)
- Ultimatum: Ceasefire! (1987)
- Cabarlo (1987)
- Hitman (1987)
- Classified Operation (1988)
- Tubusin Mo ng Dugo (1988)
- Afuang: Bounty Hunter (1988)
- Ex-Army (1988)
- Gawa Na ang Bala Na Papatay sa Iyo (1988)
- Arrest: Pat. Rizal Alih – Zamboanga Massacre (1989)
- Jack Moro (1989)
- Delima Gang (1989)
- Irampa si Mediavillo (1990)
- Mayor Latigo (1991)
- Mabuting Kaibigan... Masamang Kaaway (1991)
- FLAMES: The Movie (1997)
- Bukas Na Lang Kita Mamahalin (2001)
- Hesus, Rebolusyunaryo (2002)
- Dekada '70 (2002)
