= GMA Supershow =

Philippine television variety show

- Title card from 1990 to 1994
- Also known as: Germside; Germspesyal
- Genre: Variety show
- Directed by: Al Quinn; Fritz Infante; Willy Caliao; Louie Ignacio; Bud Daliwan
- Presented by: German Moreno
- Opening theme: GMA Supershow theme song: English (1984–92); Tagalog (1992–97)
- Country of origin: Philippines
- Original language: Tagalog
- No. of episodes: 978

Production
- Executive producers: Freddie M. Garcia; Lenny C. Parto; Roger Cruz
- Production locations: GMA Network Studios, Quezon City, Philippines (1978–87); GMA Broadway Centrum, Quezon City, Philippines (1987–97)
- Camera setup: Multiple-camera setup
- Running time: 60–210 minutes
- Production companies: Program Philippines, Inc. (1978–79); Geebees Productions (1979–84); GMA Entertainment TV (1984–97)

Original release
- Network: GMA Network
- Release: May 7, 1978 – January 26, 1997

GMA Supershow, formerly titled as Germside and Germspesyal, is a Philippine television variety show broadcast by GMA Network. The show was the longest-running Sunday noontime variety show on Philippine television at the time of its run. Hosted by German Moreno, it premiered on May 7, 1978. The show concluded on January 26, 1997, with a total of 978 episodes.

== Cast ==
Cast

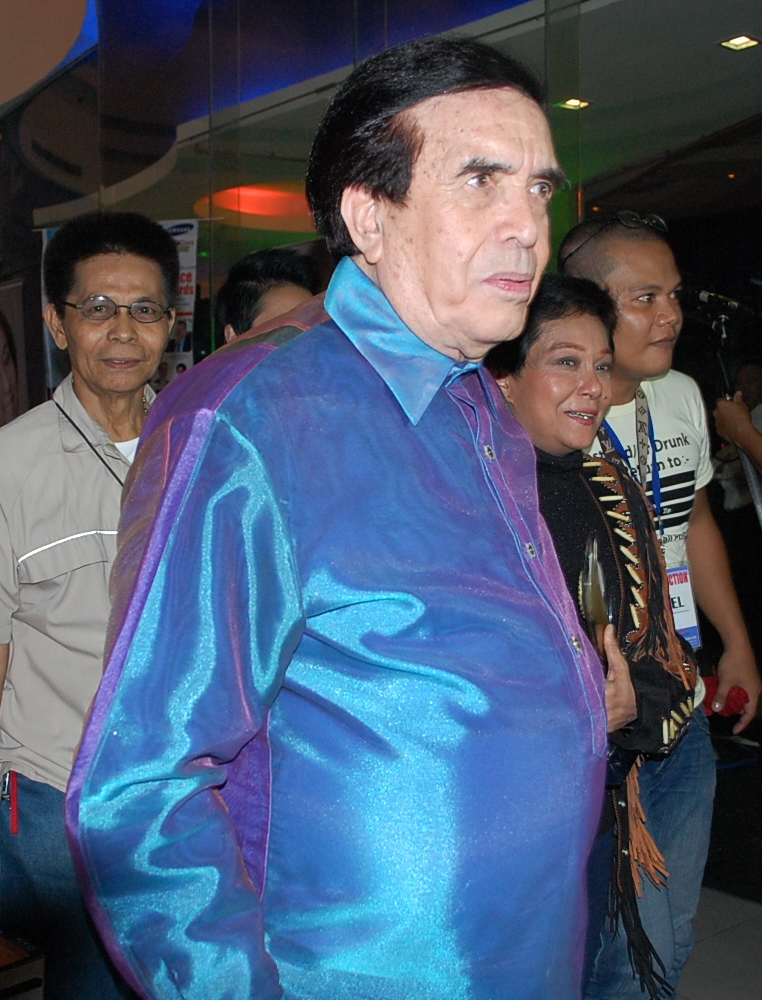
German Moreno

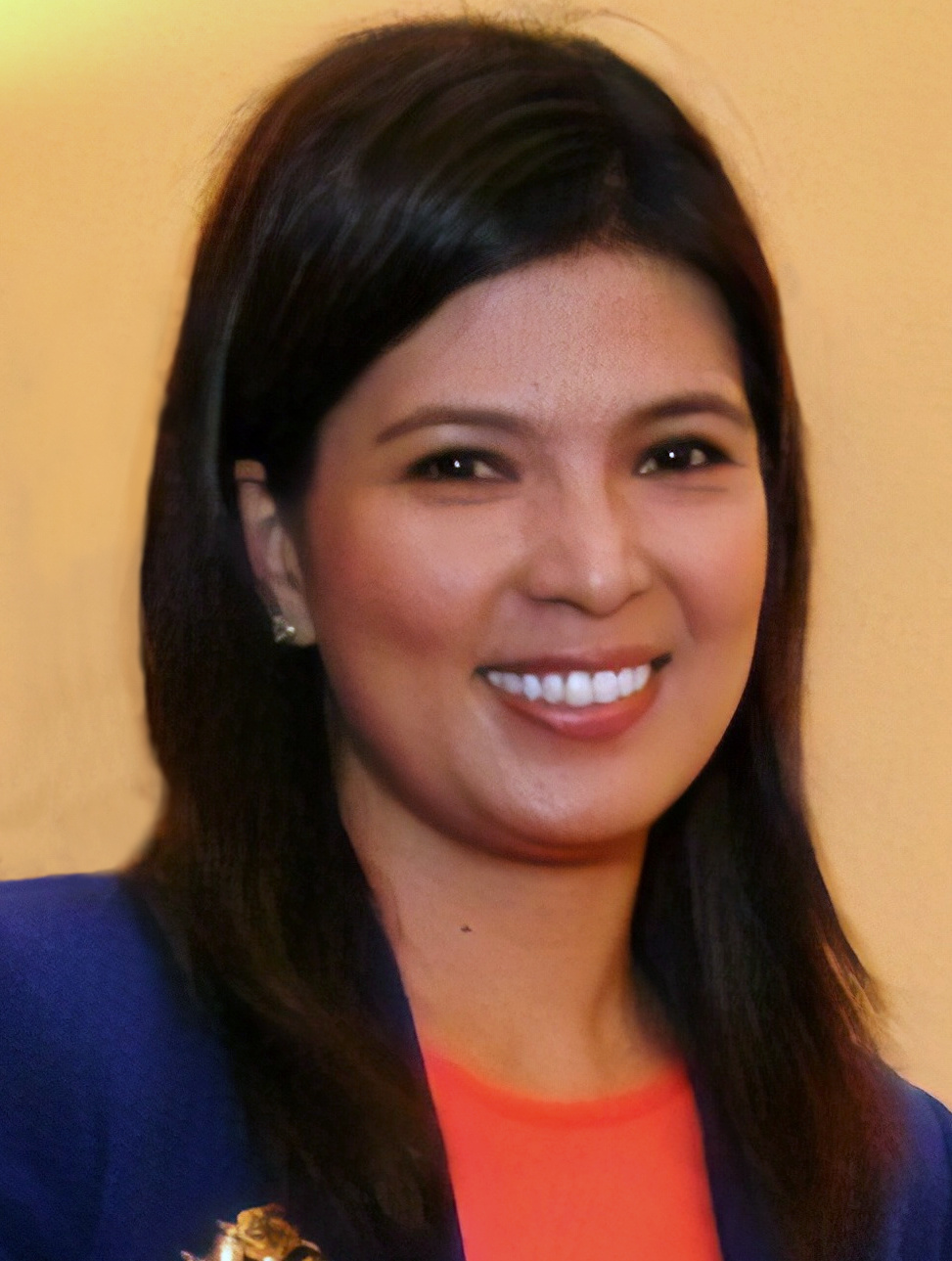
Lani Mercado

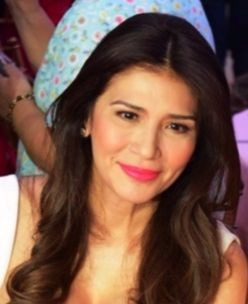
Zsa Zsa Padilla

- German Moreno (1978–97)
- Sharon Cuneta (1979–86)
- Jackie Lou Blanco (1979–97)
- Bing Loyzaga (1981–84)
- Lani Mercado (1984–97)
- Zsa Zsa Padilla (1984–87)
- Gretchen Barretto (1986–97)
- Dawn Zulueta (1988–97)
- Princess Punzalan (1987)
- Maricel Laxa (1990–97)
- Mariz (1986–97)
- Jean Garcia (1989–97)
- Sharmaine Arnaiz
- Rachel Alejandro
- Manilyn Reynes
- Princess Revilla
- Rachel Anne Wolfe (1983–91)
- Jam Morales (1983–88)
- Raymond Lauchengco (1988–97)
- Richard Reynoso (1988–97)
- Ilac Diaz
- Chad Borja
- John Nite
- The Rainmakers
- Sunshine Cruz
- Sheryl Cruz
- Ike Lozada
- Karina Ramos
- Cristina Gonzales
- Kris Aquino
- Ana Gonzales
- Mutya Crisostomo
- Alicia Mayer
- Caloy Garcia
- Arlene Muhlach
- Ogie Alcasid
- Francis Magalona
- Janno Gibbs
- Keempee de Leon (1995–97)
- RS Francisco
- Chikiting Patrol Kids
- APO Hiking Society (1978–82)
- Ruffa Gutierrez
- Edna Diaz
- Boots Anson-Roa
- Toni Rose Gayda
- Charo Santos-Concio
- Loren Legarda
- Cherie Gil
- Lorna Tolentino
- Nora Aunor
- Vilma Santos
- Aurora Salve
- Lilibeth Ranillo
- Maritess Gutierrez
- Sandy Andolong
- Alma Moreno
- Ana Gonzales
- Chiqui Hollman
- Dina Bonnevie
- Pilita Corrales
- Snooky Serna
- Pops Fernandez
- Maricel Soriano
- Aiko Melendez
- Donna Cruz
- Vina Morales
- Carmina Villarroel
- Charlene Gonzalez
- Mikee Cojuangco
- Julie Vega
- Janice de Belen
- Jaclyn Jose
- Christine Jacob
- Karla Estrada
- Amy Perez
- Regine Velasquez

Dancers

- VIP Dancers
- Kids at Work
- Abstract Dancers
- Bellestar Dancers
- Universal Motion Dancers
- The Streetboys
- Vicor Dancers
- OctoArts Dancers

== Accolades ==
Accolades received by GMA Supershow
Year	Award	Category	Recipient	Result	Ref.
1987	1st PMPC Star Awards for Television	Best Musical Variety Show	GMA Supershow	Won	
1988	2nd PMPC Star Awards for Television	Best Variety Show	GMA Supershow	Won	
1988	2nd PMPC Star Awards for Television	Best Male TV Host	German Moreno	Won	
1989	3rd PMPC Star Awards for Television	Best Variety Show	GMA Supershow	Won	
1990	4th PMPC Star Awards for Television	Best Variety Show	GMA Supershow	Won	
1991	KBP Golden Dove Awards	Best Variety Show	GMA Supershow	Won	
1991	5th PMPC Star Awards for Television	Best Variety Show	GMA Supershow	Won	
1991	5th PMPC Star Awards for Television	Best Male TV Host	German Moreno	Won	
1992	KBP Golden Dove Awards	Best Variety Show	GMA Supershow	Won	
1993	KBP Golden Dove Awards	Best Variety Show	GMA Supershow	Won	
1993	7th PMPC Star Awards for Television	Best Variety Show	GMA Supershow	Won	
1994	KBP Golden Dove Awards	Best Variety Show	GMA Supershow	Won	
1994	New York TV Festivals	Entertainment Program	GMA Supershow	Finalist	
1994	8th PMPC Star Awards for Television	Best Variety Show	GMA Supershow	Won	
1994	8th PMPC Star Awards for Television	Best Male TV Host	German Moreno	Won	
1996	10th PMPC Star Awards for Television	Best Musical Variety Show	GMA Supershow	Won	
