= Ronald Corveau =

Filipino actor (born 1956)

Ronald Maquilan Corveau (born 1956) is a former Filipino actor. He portrayed Carding Medel in the 1977 TV show Gulong ng Palad. He was also in films such as Beerhouse (1977), Mahal Kong Taksil (1979), Biktima (1980), Gabriela (1989), and the award-winning Atsay (1978) opposite Nora Aunor.

He was previously married to his Gulong co-star Marianne dela Riva, with whom he has two daughters: Ella and Louie.

Having left acting and moved to the United States, Corveau currently serves as a drilling contractor in Montana.

== Filmography ==
=== Film ===
- Beerhouse (1977)
- Atsay (1978)
- Disgrasyada (1979)
- Si Mahal Ko... Nakialam Na Naman (1979)
- Annie Batungbakal (1979)
- Halik sa Paa, Halik sa Kamay (1979)
- Mahal Kong Taksil (1979)
- Kadete (1979)
- 4 Na Maria (1980)
- Biktima (1980)
- Gabriela (1989)

=== Television ===
- Gulong ng Palad (1977)
