= Malu Maglutac =

Malu Maglutac Chiongbian
- Born: Maria Lourdes Maglutac; October 10, 1960 (age 65); Makati, Philippines
- Education: Saint Paul College of Makati
- Alma mater: University of the Philippines Diliman

Maria "Malu" Lourdes Maglutac Chiongbian (born October 10, 1960) is a former Filipino TV show host, ballet dancer, model, actress, newscaster, and beauty pageant title holder. She co-hosted the variety show Student Canteen from 1984 to 1990.

== Early life ==
Malu Maglutac was born in 1960 in Makati, Philippines. She is the daughter of businessman Mariano Maglutac and Alice Morales. She and her two older brothers, Joey and Thomas, were brought up in Bel-Air Village, a gated subdivision in the Makati area. Maglutac was raised Catholic, but she later identified as Christian.

She began studying Ballet at age 4 under the late Inday Gaston Mañosa.

Throughout elementary and high school at St. Paul College Manila, Malu was on the honor roll and consistently excelled in her classes. Despite a rigorous ballet training schedule, she captained the Cheerleading Team. She continued her higher education at University of the Philippines, Diliman and received B.S. Tourism degree.

== Career ==
- Student Canteen
- Kumpletos Recados

== Political views ==
In 1986, Maglutac campaigned for the reelection of president Ferdinand Marcos in the 1986 snap election.

== Personal life ==
She married businessman Roy Chiongbian on October 8, 2001. They have a daughter together. She has three dogs.
