= Family Kuarta o Kahon =

- Also known as: Kuarta o Kahon
- Genre: Game show
- Presented by: Pepe Pimentel
- Country of origin: Philippines
- Original language: Filipino

Production
- Production locations: Old ABS Building, Roxas Boulevard, Philippines (1962–1968); ABS-CBN Broadcasting Center, Quezon City, Philippines (1968–1972); Broadcast Plaza, Quezon City, Philippines (1973–1978); Live Studio 1 Broadcast City, Quezon City, Philippines (1978–1986); Entertainment Plaza, SM City North EDSA, Quezon City, Philippines (1986–2000)
- Running time: 60 minutes (1962–1986); 120 minutes (1986–1991); 90 minutes (1991–2000)

Original release
- Network: ABS-CBN (1962–1972); BBC/City2 (1973–1984); RPN/New Vision 9 (1984–2000)
- Release: July 1, 1962 – December 17, 2000

Family Kuarta o Kahon (formerly Kuwarta o Kahon and The Pepe Pimentel Show) was a Philippine television game show broadcast by ABS-CBN, BBC/City2 and RPN/New Vision 9. Hosted by Pepe Pimentel, it aired from July 1, 1962 to December 17, 2000. It holds the record for being the longest-running Philippine game show for 38 years.

== Host ==
=== Main host ===
- Pepe Pimentel (1962–2000)

=== Co-hosts ===
- Jerry Pons (1962–1972)
- Vic Morales (1962–1986)
- Fred Montilla (1962–1972)
- Apeng Daldal (1962–1972)
- Amy Perez (1986–1989)
- Pinky Marquez
- Encar Benedicto (1984–2000)
- Plinky Recto (1988–1993)
- Monina Tan (1982–1986)
- Marissa Sanchez (1995–2000)
- Lito Pimentel (1984–2000)
- Richard Reynoso (1995–1998)
- Arnell Ignacio (1990–1995)
- Michael Segovia (1992–1995)
- Anthony Segovia (1992–1995)
- Elvira Manahan
- Sharon Cuneta (1978–1979)
- Charo Santos
- Zsa Zsa Padilla
- Jamie Rivera
- Lovely Rivero

== See also ==
- List of programs broadcast by ABS-CBN
- List of programs broadcast by Banahaw Broadcasting Corporation
- List of programs previously broadcast by Radio Philippines Network
- Eat Bulaga!
- Magandang Tanghali Bayan
- Wowowee
- It's Showtime
