= Student Canteen =

Philippine television variety show

- Title card
- Genre: Variety show
- Directed by: Ramon Ramano
- Presented by: Eddie Ilarde; Bobby Ledesma
- Country of origin: Philippines
- Original language: Tagalog

Production
- Production locations: Studio 1, Chronicle Building, Manila, Philippines (1958–65); Studio A, GMA Building, Quezon City, Philippines (1975–86); Live Studio 1, RPN Studio, Broadcast City, Quezon City, Philippines (1989–90)
- Camera setup: Multiple-camera setup
- Running time: 90–120 minutes
- Production company: Program Philippines Inc.

Original release
- Network: ABS-CBN (1958–65); GMA Radio-Television Arts (1975–86); Radio Philippines Network (1989–90)
- Release: July 21, 1958 – June 9, 1990

Student Canteen is a Philippine television variety show broadcast by ABS-CBN from 1958 to 1965, GMA Radio-Television Arts from 1975 to 1986, and Radio Philippines Network from 1989 to 1990.

== History ==
=== DZXL ===
Student Canteen was originally a radio show on DZXL hosted by Eddie Ilarde, Bobby Ledesma, Bobby de Veyra and Leila Benitez, entitled CBN Canteen. The noontime show was aired on the canteen of the old Manila Chronicle Building in Aduana, Manila. It was later renamed Student Canteen after it became a hit with students.

=== Chronicle Broadcasting Network/ABS-CBN (1958–65) ===
In July 1958, DZXL Channel 9, then owned by the Chronicle Broadcasting Network, started broadcast operations. Student Canteen was brought to television that same year.

The noontime show ended in 1965 when Eddie Ilarde went into politics. Prior to that however, the set of hosts for the show was replaced after main hosts Bobby Ledesma and Leila Benitez walked out of the program along with Eddie following a dispute. Pete Roa, then production manager of ABS-CBN, handpicked his wife Boots Anson-Roa, Ben Aniceto, Pepe Pimentel and Nelda Navarro as replacements.

=== GMA Radio-Television Arts (1975–86) ===
In 1975, the triumvirate of Menardo Jimenez, Felipe Gozon and Gilberto Duavit Sr. took over RBS and changed its name to GMA Radio-Television Arts. Looking for a show that could serve as a gateway to daytime dominance, the new management conducted negotiations with Eddie Ilarde who readily agreed to revive Student Canteen under his production company Program Philippines Inc.

In January 1975, Student Canteen was revived, with Helen Vela and Coney Reyes joining original hosts Pepe Pimentel, Bobby Ledesma and Eddie Ilarde. Ramon Ramano was the original director of the show. Ariston "Aris" Bautista was the floor director, and later the show's director.

The show had a segment called "Search for the Student Canteener" which was a singing contest. This segment attracted a lot of high quality contestants and many of former "Canteeners", including Marco Sison, became successful professional singers. Many other singing contest segments within the show produced some of the country's top singers. Bert Nievera, for example, was the champion of the segment called, "Search for Johnny Mathis of the Philippines."

The program also featured a highly popular segment called "IQ 7" which was a quiz contest and produced the country's top quiz champions like Rogelio "Bong" Barrameda, Ramon Lorenzo, Romeo Miat, Victor Saymo, Vic Volfango, Antonio Manaloto, Esmeraldo Tellerva, Gil Manimbo, Eduardo Alvaran, Virgilio Acasio, Nazzir Abbas, Roberto Villareal, Emilio Apostol, Nehemias Miguel, Nilo Francisco, Sonny Pascual, Leoncio Pelayo, David Oriel, Leon Bongulto, Pete Dadula, and Boni Magtibay. A spin-off of the quiz segment "IQ 7" called "Battle of Campus Brains" produced the first and only female quiz champion in the history of GMA-7 quiz shows, Essem Zisenia Solomon, who defeated the then reigning champion Pete Dadula and several other quiz veterans.

Student Canteen was the only noontime show that existed in the 1970s before the debut of Eat Bulaga! on July 30, 1979, hosted by the trio of Tito Sotto, Vic Sotto & Joey de Leon, formerly from Student Canteen. Eat Bulaga! was in danger of cancellation until the segment "Mr. Macho" made it the top-rating noontime show in 1980. Afterwards, Student Canteen's ratings began to decline. Coney Reyes would leave the show after it took in Chiqui Hollmann, formerly from Eat Bulaga!. Other fresh faces would later join Student Canteen, including Jackie Lou Blanco, Chat Silayan, Dyords Javier and Francis Magalona. Julie Vega was supposed to be included in the show however, the plan was shelved following her illness and subsequent death in 1985.

The show's stint on GMA ended on June 7, 1986.

=== Radio Philippines Network (1989–90) ===
Student Canteen went back on air on February 20, 1989, through RPN (renamed as New Vision 9) taking over the slot of Eat Bulaga! which moved to ABS-CBN. The show was retitled Student Canteen (The Third Generation) because it was the show's third revival and third decade of existence. Original hosts Eddie Ilarde and Bobby Ledesma were joined by Malu Maglutac, Jean Garcia, Cherry Pie Picache and Atoy Co as co-hosts. Ramon Lorenzo served as the quiz master for the "IQ 7" segment.

The show ended on June 9, 1990, due to disagreements between the RPN management and the hosts. A revival was in the works again the following year but was shelved after Bobby Ledesma died in 1993.

== Cast ==
- Eddie Ilarde (1958–90)
- Pepe Pimentel (1958–86)
- Bobby Ledesma (1958–90)
- The Tiongco Brothers
- Sharon L.
- Helen Vela (1975–86)
- Leila Benitez (1958–65)
- Coney Reyes (1975–82)
- Carmi Martin (1976–84)
- Tito Sotto (pinch-hitter, 1976–79)
- Vic Sotto (pinch-hitter, 1976–79)
- Joey de Leon (pinch-hitter, 1976–79)
- Malu Maglutac (1984–90)
- Atoy Co (1989–90)
- Chiqui Hollmann (1982–86)
- Jackie Lou Blanco (1982–86)
- Dyords Javier
- APO Hiking Society
- Jean Garcia (1989–90)
- Francis Magalona (1984–86)
- Rachel Anne Wolfe (1984–86)
- Chat Silayan (1981–86)
- J.C. Bonnin (1985–86)
- Marco Sison (1985–86)
- Benedict Aquino
- Jam Morales (1984–86)
- Charles Harner (1984–86)
- Lou Veloso
- Cherry Pie Picache (1989–90)
