= Pepe Pimentel =

Filipino game show host and actor (1929-2013)

- Born: José Gonzáles Pimentel; April 27, 1930; Philippine Islands
- Died: January 24, 2013 (aged 82); Quezon City, Philippines
- Resting place: San Juan City
- Other names: Tito Pepe
- Occupations: Game show host, actor, singer, politician
- Years active: 1962–2000
- Spouse(s): Mercedes A. Pimentel; Cecilia L. Pimentel
- Children: From first wife (Mercedes A. Pimentel): Remedios Pimentel Vanhoven, Narciso Antiporda Pimentel, Teresita Pimentel Herrero. From second wife (Cecilia Pimentel): Jose "Joel" Pimentel, Jr. Isabel Pimentel, Gil Pimentel
- Relatives: Lito Pimentel (nephew)

José "Pepe" Gonzáles Pimentel, Sr. (April 27, 1930 – January 24, 2013) was a Filipino game show host, television personality, actor, and singer. He gained fame as the first champion of the original television reality competition show Tawag ng Tanghalan (1955). Pimentel later became known as the host of Family Kwarta o Kahon, which ran for 38 years and was considered the precursor and inspiration for popular game segments such as Wowowee’s Pera o Bayong.

After his show business career, Pimentel served as barangay captain in Barangay Laging Handa, Quezon City (1997–2007) and was described by neighbors as very helpful and friendly.

Pimentel died on January 24, 2013, in Barangay Laging Handa, Quezon City, at the age of 82.

== Filmography ==
=== Television ===
Year	Title
1962–2000	Family Kuarta o Kahon
1965–1972	Tawag ng Tanghalan
1958–1965	Student Canteen
1975–1986	Student Canteen
1977–1978	Clubhouse 9
1987	Tayo'y Magsaya

=== Film ===
Year	Title	Role
1963	Ang Babaeng Isputnik	
1963	Fil-American Girl	
1963	Dear Eddie	
1963	Carioca	
1965	Hamon ng Kampeon	
1966	The Jukebox Queen	
1968	Dos Por Dos	
1969	Banda 24	
1982	Juan Balutan	
1983	D'Godson	
1985	I Won, I Won: Ang S'werte Nga Naman	
