= Gulong ng Palad =

2006 Philippine television drama series

- Title card
- Also known as: Stand for Love
- Genre: Drama
- Based on: Gulong ng Palad (1977) (1949–1956 radio series)
- Developed by: ABS-CBN Studios; Roldeo T. Endrinal
- Written by: Reggie Amigo
- Directed by: Erick C. Salud; Jerome Chavez Pobocan
- Starring: Kristine Hermosa; TJ Trinidad
- Opening theme: "Gulong ng Palad" by Jerome Sala
- Country of origin: Philippines
- Original language: Tagalog
- No. of episodes: 88

Production
- Executive producer: Joan del Rosario
- Running time: 30–40 minutes
- Production company: Dreamscape Entertainment

Original release
- Network: ABS-CBN
- Release: January 9 – May 12, 2006

Related
- Gulong ng Palad (1977–1985)

Gulong ng Palad (International title: Stand for Love / transl. wheel of fate) is a 2006 Philippine television drama broadcast by ABS-CBN. Directed by Erick C. Salud and Jerome Chavez Pobocan, it stars Kristine Hermosa and TJ Trinidad. The series is based on the 1949–1956 radio drama and 1977–1985 television drama of the same title. It aired on the network's Primetime Bida line up from January 9 to May 12, 2006, and was replaced by Bituing Walang Ningning.

== Premise ==
Luisa the daughter of a laundrywoman and Carding, the mayor's son, are best friends. However their friendship is disapproved by both their mothers, Menang Medel, the mayor's wife due to her looking down on the poor and Edad, Luisa's mother who believes that all people must stand in their right place/social standing. Despite this, both children remained best friends. Upon the death of Carding's father, however, his mother, Menang, decides to take him away to the U.S. to live with her. This caused a huge blow to their family fortune as Menang does not know how to keep her husband's assets and is too proud to live below their means. Luisa and Carding promised to write to each other, but Carding doesn't fulfill his promise, leading Luisa to distrust him and become determined to stay away from him when he returned ten years later.

Mimi Sandoval, the daughter of a rich real estate developer Carmen Sandoval (who also happens to be Menang's best friend), studies at the same school Luisa is studying. Aside from being her rival in the school ranking, Mimi is also keen in winning Carding's heart. Menang Medel does approve of Mimi because of her social class and is always encouraging Carding to date her, as Carmen's wealth would benefit them. Carding however is smitten with Luisa despite their poverty. Angry with this, Mimi decides to deny Luisa her only chance of getting a scholarship by bribing their school with new computers and air conditioners. Her mother, Carmen, despite wealthy is a rational women and disapproves her actions but has to put up with Mimi as she keeps a secret – Mimi is in fact – adopted as Carmen cannot bear children.

After Luisa's graduation and failed attempts for scholarship applications, Luisa's family agrees to put up a money jar to save enrollment money for her. This causes a huge rift between Luisa and her sister Nene, as it seems like the family is playing favorites with her. Nene however also has her own secrets – she despises her family and pretends to be wealthy and is also stealing money from the money jar.

When Totoy, Luisa's sickly older brother, becomes ill from too much work for Luisa's schooling, Luisa decides to forget her college dreams and work as a servant on Carmen's home to help pay for the family debt in Totoy's hospitalization. Mimi uses this as an advantage, and treats Luisa unfairly, giving her difficult chores and depriving her rest. Realizing her daughter is suffering, Edad tells Luisa to stop working as she would pay Carmen with her paycheck. When Luisa disagrees, Edad finally explodes and reveals to her family how she regrets marrying Thomas, their father, as he has promised to give them a better life. Thomas, along with some financial problems arising within their family, becomes greatly depressed, causing his already failing heart condition to worsen.

Menang realizes that her funds are running out, and decides to loan money from David, a wealthy businessman with shady activities. But Menang's extravagant life causes her to be more in debt, so David suggests she enter politics as it can help her regain her deflating bank account. Menang, with no choice, submits and files candidacy for Mayor. With no source of campaign funds she begins to exhaust the family's remaining savings and some amount from Carding's trust deposit for her campaign, despite David's obvious embezzling.

Carding and Luisa, on the other hand, began to start a relationship, despite Menang's open disapproval, Edad's anger and Mimi's envy. Mimi on the other hand, pretends to support the two of them but is determined to ruin their relationship behind their backs. Edad, now afraid of her daughter's infiltration with the wealthy, decides to lock her up and send her away. But Carding and Luisa find ways to meet with each other. When Menang openly humiliates Edad in front of the people of Sta Lucia, this caused a huge blow to her campaign, which opted her to back out. But Carding gets into an accident and she has to resort to David to pay for their hospital bills. Carding, who falls into a coma, is tended by Luisa, who is now determined not to part with him. At the same time, a newcomer arrives in town, Diego, a handsome city boy and his sister Jojo, a tomboyish girl. Totoy is smitten with Jojo while Diego himself falls in love with Luisa.

When Carding wakes up from coma he and Luisa decides to run away. This caused a huge scandal in Santa Lucia, as Luisa is believed to be a modest woman. Menang, taking this as an opportunity towards her favor, announces that she is ready to accept Luisa as daughter in law and marries Carding to her with a lavish wedding. Edad and Totoy disowned Luisa at that very moment as they blame her for shattering their dreams of alleviating poverty. Tomas however went to the ceremony as he knew his days are numbered, his heart condition a secret in an attempt to not burden his family with his severe health problem.

Life becomes even harder for Luisa after she marries Carding. Her mother has not forgiven her, Carding goes off to Manila for college leaving her in the evil hands of Menang, who controls all her actions. Menang's plan is to make Luisa look bad in front of all people and Carding, so that he will leave her and the devastated Mimi can take her chance. After having enough of Menang Luisa finally stands up for herself, but this causes more and more problems for her family. Both Tomas and Totoy lose their jobs, her youngest brother Peping got nearly kidnapped by men hired by Menang. The job loss caused Tomas to have a heart attack on his way home, and he is run over by an oncoming train. Luisa finally decides to get even by exposing Menang's lies and schemes. Carding, who is a Mama's boy, becomes stuck between the important women in his life and doesn't know whom to believe. He finally turns to Mimi who uses his vulnerability to her advantage. Mimi finally sees this as a chance to get Carding, meanwhile Diego admits his adoration for Luisa. He helps Luisa earn money for her family by sending her embroideries. Menang however accuses Luisa of stealing, and talks Carding into it.

Believing his married life in trouble, Carding has a drunken night out with Mimi, who finally got her way with him. Carding feels guilty about sleeping with Mimi and avoids going home to face Luisa. Menang uses this to turn him against his wife by saying that Luisa is having an affair with Diego. Luisa decides to leave the Medel household and reconcile with her family. Edad, Totoy and Nene finally forgive her, and during a rally, they publicly reveal Menang's meddling with her father's death. Menang retaliates by throwing insults to the poor, calling them gold digging scums. When the people of Santa Lucia hear this, they turn their support away from Menang, causing her to lose the Mayor position.

Diego, believing that Carding has left Luisa, tries to win her affections by looking after her and her family. When she rejects him, he tries to rape her. He goes to prison for his crime, but a fight inside the jail causes him to be stabbed. Luisa realizes she is pregnant and informs Carding, who decides to forget all their problems behind and start afresh with her. Mimi, however, goes to Diego in his deathbed to offer him cash in return to deceiving Carding by falsely admitting that he and Luisa have an illicit relationship and that the child she is carrying is his. Carding, brainwashed by both Mimi and Menang, believes these falsehoods and leaves the devastated Luisa. Luckily, Jojo had read a letter from Diego himself before his death, saying that he and Luisa didn't have an affair and in fact, Mimi told him to tell this rumor to Carding in order to ruin Luisa's reputation and she'd win his (Carding's) heart in exchange for money, which is to be left for Jojo's future. She tries to tell Luisa, but Mimi hires people to end her. Alex, Carding's cousin, nearly sideswipes Luisa and is also blackmailed by Mimi and decides to help Jojo get her revenge with Mimi.

Menang realizes that she is now penniless and destitute after not winning the elections, and when the debts become too high she commits arson by burning their mansion down to gain insurance money which amounts to 20 million pesos. But the fire found to be intentional and Menang not only loses her house, but also her beauty as she gets disfigured. With no one else to turn to as all their rich friends and colleagues had forsaken them, Carding and Menang take refuge under Luisa's roof, but Edad drives the two of them afterwards due to Carding accusing Luisa of infidelity and Menang openly disrespecting Luisa. Luisa finally gets to her senses and leaves her husband and mother-in-law to themselves. Mimi gets this opportunity to win Carding's favor by giving them money to start over. But Menang's proud lifestyle caused it to run out. Menang tries to resort to illegal activities to try to earn back her wealth but she is caught with a warning. Finally realizing that they have no means to buy food other than to earn it, Carding stops grieving his failed marriage and tries his luck applying for work. But his unfinished schooling caused him to be employed as a waiter, and due to his upbringing, he suffers greatly as he is not used to labor.

Soon enough, Totoy goes to the city to try his luck and is helped by a wealthy lady in building his own cafe which transforms his family's situation dramatically. Mimi pretends that she is pregnant but when her mother finds out she cuts her off financially until she decides to go back with her to America. Carding briefly has a relationship with her until it is discovered that she is faking her pregnancy and both Carding and Menang throw her out. Carding and Menang began to experience a miserable life filled with remorse for what they have done to Luisa while Luisa and her family, who is now in comfortable circumstances thanks to Totoy, leaves Santa Lucia to start over in Manila. Luisa, having gotten enough of her husband, decides to leave him with Mimi and give up their marriage, without knowing that Carding left Mimi to get back with her.

Carding finally realizes how much he loves Luisa but is ashamed about the way he treated her. Mother and son are both evicted from their apartment due to not paying rent and Menang is humiliated by everyone around her and finally learns humility. Carding and Menang decides to follow Luisa and her family to Manila to patch things up. Menang also advises Carding to forget Luisa and start anew as she was living a much better life without them and they would only cause her troubles.

Luisa and her family finds Menang in the streets while they are attending church service and invites her to live with them. Menang finally tearfully asks for forgiveness for everything she has done. Carding, still ashamed of everything, watches from afar as he still feels guilty for the way he had treated Luisa.

Mimi, after losing her mind gets jailed for her schemes towards Jojo and Alex. She is bailed by her mother but she does not give up easily. Mimi trespasses on Luisa's house in Manila and tries to kill her but fails as Carding comes to save Luisa. She turns on Carding and knocks him unconscious before tying him up inside her car, determined to take him as her possession. Carding however manages to escape and Mimi crashes her car causing both of her legs to be amputated.

In the end, Mimi is incarcerated as an amputee and her cellmates abuse her endlessly while Carmen, having enough of Mimi's wickedness, leaves her on her own. Totoy's successful restaurant business expands into chains and is now building a mansion in Santa Lucia. Menang learns the art of humility and kindness and Idad finally gets what she has always been wishing – a good life for her family. Luisa and Carding make amends with each other and raise their daughter together. Jojo finally behaves like a girl and starts dating Totoy. Luisa affirms that life has its ups and downs but in the end, it always teaches a lesson to be a better human being.

== Cast and characters ==
=== Main cast (ABS-CBN) ===
- Kristine Hermosa as Luisa Santos-Medel – The eldest daughter of the Santos family. As the eldest of a family of four, Luisa has always been a very loving, kind and caring person. Due to her family's high expectations of her as she is regarded as their only hope to bring them out of poverty, she excelled academically in high school with the hopes of becoming valedictorian and obtaining a scholarship but was unable to do so due to Mimi providing their school computers in an attempt to be the valedictorian. Despite this, Luisa remains hopeful and promises to provide for her family. She falls in love with her childhood friend, Carding. At the end of the series, it is revealed that Luisa has given birth to a girl.
- TJ Trinidad as Ricardo "Carding" Medel – He is the only child and son of the Medel family. Upon the death of his father, both he and his mother relocate to the U.S. Despite growing up in a prominent and wealthy family, Carding is a humble and caring individual, who as a child, befriends Luisa who becomes his best friend and later on his wife. Due to financial struggles that are kept hidden by his mother, he returns to Santa Lucia and attends university in Manila. He finally reconnects with Luisa and falls in love with her. He becomes involved in a head on collision after being rejected by Luisa and whilst in a coma, Luisa declares her feelings for him which later on, starts the beginning of their relationship. As the series progresses, married life for Carding and Luisa becomes challenging and by the end, Carding and Luisa both declare their love for each other and finally reunite. Carding shares a daughter with Luisa.
- Cherie Gil as Philomena "Menang" Medel – Carding's mother and a wealthy socialite. Menang despises poor people, seeing them as gold diggers and doesn't approve Carding on dating Luisa. Menang is encouraging Carding to date Mimi as their marriage will help boast her campaign for mayor. In the end, Menang attempted to burn her house down to get the insurance money, but was discovered and was left homeless and injured, Menang began experiencing the poor life and began to realize the error of her ways. She asked Luisa's family for forgiveness and they accepted, even allowing her to live with them. She is the grandmother of Carding and Luisa's child.
- Andrea del Rosario as Mimi Sandoval – A girl coming from a wealthy family, Mimi is deeply infatuated with Carding and is extremely jealous of Luisa. Despite Luisa being selected as the valedictorian, Mimi ultimately becomes her school's valedictorian by using her wealth for providing computers for her school. As the series progresses, Mimi has become a deranged psychopath and is willing to resort to murder, blackmails, and manipulation in order to accomplish her tasks. She was later discovered and was arrested for her crimes, she was later bailed out by her mother Carmen. Mimi is set out to finish what she started, killing Luisa. She sneaked into Jojo's house and knock her unconscious and acquires the address to Luisa's place. She sneaked into her house and attempts to kill her but Carding subdues Mimi and saves Luisa, just as he is about to take Luisa to the hospital and call 911, Mimi knocks him unconscious with a tire iron. Mimi attempts to kill herself and Carding, seeing that if she can't have him [even his family's wealth] then no one will, but they were involved in an accident which results Mimi losing her legs. Mimi was arrested yet again for attempting murder and was sentenced to life imprisonment. Mimi's mother Carmen can only watch as her daughter is being abused by the female inmates.

=== Supporting cast ===
- Rio Locsin as Caridad "Idad" Santos
- Joel Torre as Tomas Santos
- Luis Alandy as Diego Morales
- Joross Gamboa as Totoy Santos
- Roxanne Guinoo as Josefina "Jojo" Morales
- Hazel Ann Mendoza as Nene Santos
- Oliver Aquino as Mark Sandoval
- Nash Aguas as Peping Santos

=== Extended and guest cast ===
- Tuesday Vargas as Saling
- Racquel Villavicencio as Carmen Sandoval
- Lito Pimentel as David
- Ahron Villena as Japoy
- Amy Perez as Lorraine Pineda
- Rico Barrera as Alex Trinidad
- Denise Joaquin as Wendy
- Mishella Angela Maravilla as Chelsea
- Mosang as Belen
- Emma Villanueva as Tekla
- Gigi Locsin as Doray
- Benjie Felipe as Banjo
- Gian Carlo Terry as Butch
- Jeremiah Rosales as Makoy
- Khaycee Aboloc as Gwen
- Juan Rodrigo as Juancho Medel
- Kathryn Bernardo as Young Mimi
- Phytos Ramirez as Young Carding
- Alexis Ramos as Young Saling
- Reggie Curley as Gary
- Maureen Larrazabal as Khyna
- Louissa Pressman as Luisa about age 5
- Yassi Pressman as Luisa about age 11

== Season 1 Episodes ==
=== Week 2 ===
Original airdate	Season	Episode #	Mega Manila Rating
September 28, 2009	1	2	28.9%
September 28, 2009	Mimi bribes the school by buying computers and wins the valedictorian scholarship to attend college. Luisa comes second and does not get a scholarship to college. Luisa goes to her and Carding's childhood place and cries. Too bad for her. Carding passes their childhood place but on entering Luisa has already left. Carding accepts Mimi's invitation to attend the valedictorian ball. Idad (Luisa's mother) makes Luisa a beautiful dress for the ball. Mimi is jealous and makes it dirty. Luisa runs home but Carding hears her friend Saling call her. He runs to Luisa. Luisa and Carding are very happy to see each other. Mimi sees this and tries to take Carding away. Carding tells Mimi he only went to the ball because he wanted to see Luisa. Mimi is furious and starts drinking. Carding asks Luisa for a dance and she accepts. ('Love is in the air'.) Mimi is mad and pours a drink in Luisa's face. Luisa tells her friend Saling that she is in love with Carding. Menang (Carding's mother) wants to sell her jewels. It is as if they are running out of money, but she cannot accept it. Carding's mother hears the news about the ball and tells Carding to consider being with Mimi (as her family is rich), and not Luisa who is a laundrywoman's daughter. Carding warns Mimi to never reveal his secret and will never consider her as a friend if she does. Luisa goes to do her mother's chores at Carding's house. Menang comes over and warns her to remember that she is a laundrywoman's daughter.		
September 29, 2009	1	3	28.9%
September 29, 2009	Menang tells Idad to tell her daughter to stay away from Carding. Mimi asks Carding to go out with her. He refuses but Medel tells him to let Mimi show him around. On the way, Carding sees Luisa. Mimi tries to knock her over and Luisa falls in the mud. Carding tells Mimi to take him home and he becomes angry at her. He goes back to apologise to Luisa. Later Carding tells Mimi to apologise to Luisa if she still wants to be Carding's friend. Nene (Luisa's sister) is jealous about how her family neglects her and favors Luisa. She tries to steal money that is being saved for Luisa to attend college. Totoy (Luisa's brother) gets sick and is taken to the hospital but the family don't have money to treat him. Idad begs Medel if she can borrow some money but she is given very little. Mimi overhears their conversation and decides to help just to please Carding. Luisa asks for a job in Mimi's house and Mimi mistreats her. Idad asks Luisa if Carding is courting her but she says they are just friends. Idad tells her not to see him again because the difference in their statuses will bring problems. Carding takes Luisa to see their old train but Mimi sees them and tells Idad, who becomes angry.		
September 30, 2006	1	4	29.3%
September 30, 2006	Luisa is punished by Idad. She tells Carding that she was just pretending to be lovers and that they are only friends. Carding goes to Mimi and asks if she can convince Luisa to be lovers. Mimi does the opposite. Medel mortgages her house and she meets up with Simone who tells her to get into politics to recover her money. Luisa continues to ignore Carding even though she still loves him to avoid hurting her mother and family.		
October 1, 2009	1	5	29.3%
October 1, 2009	Carding tries but fails to ignore Luisa based on Mimi's advice that she will apologize and come back to him. As Luisa walks down the street with Saling they meet Diego who is new in town and turns out to be Luisa's neighbor. Luisa is surprised by Diego even though she still cares about Carding. Carding follows Luisa and warns her that if she won't talk to him he will have to die by lying down over the train tracks. The train comes and Luisa screams that she will talk to him. Carding sees Diego talking to Luisa and Saling and later confronts him out of jealousy. Carding is happy about Luisa and tells Mimi who gets mad. She takes it out on Luisa by overworking her. As Luisa leaves late in the night she sees Carding waiting for her and gets into his car. Idad and Tomas (Luisa's father) see Carding's car but cannot see who Carding is with. When asked Carding claims he was with Mimi who later accepts that it was her. To show his appreciation Carding accepts her invitation to play golf. Idad apologises to Luisa for doubting her.		

=== Week 3 ===
Original airdate	Season	Episode #	Mega Manila Rating
October 6, 2009	1	6	28.9%
October 6, 2009	Carding decides to tell Luisa that he loves her. Mimi tries to set them up to be caught. Luisa avoids Carding but he tricks her to a romantic date where he tells Luisa that he loves her. Luisa is out of words. She leaves him without saying what she feels. Medel is becoming increasingly bankrupt. She decides to run for mayor. Tomas is stressed about the family's finances and discovers that he has a heart problem. Diego becomes close with Luisa's family and they come to love him.		
October 7, 2009	1	7	28.9%
October 7, 2009	Carding again tries to ask Lusia if she loves him and she says no even though she does. Carding is distraught and speeds on his motorbike and gets into an accident. Medel runs for mayor but despises the poor. Saling informs Luisa's family about Carding's accident and Luisa becomes worried. Luisa sneaks out with Saling at night to visit Carding. She confesses to Carding that she loves him even though he's in a coma. Menang wants to stop running for mayor because she is worried about her son.		
October 7, 2009	1	8	28.9%
October 7, 2009	Carding recovers and he asks if Luisa visited. Menang lies and says that she did not, but that Mimi was there all day and night with him. Luisa is happy that Carding is fine but thinks twice about the promise she made that she will tell Carding that she loves him. It seems as if Totoy is in love with Jojo (Diego's sister). Menang decides to continue running for mayor. Menang asks Carding why he and Luisa are not talking and if Luisa is the cause of the accident. Carding says no and that everything between them is over because Luisa doesn't love him. Luisa wants to talk to Carding but is afraid of her mother and Carding's mother.		
October 8, 2009	1	9	28.9%
October 8, 2009	While Carding is recovering he keeps hearing Luisa talking to him. Carding resolves to go to college in the city with Mimi. Carding finally talks with Luisa and she admits that she loves him. He is so happy that he cancels his trip to study in the city and Mimi cancels too. Both Carding and Luisa are happy but know that their mothers will not like the decision. Totoy and Jojo are not on good terms because Totoy refers to Jojo as a tomboy. Tomas is having heart problems but doesn't want his family to know.		

=== Week 4 ===
Original airdate	Season	Episode #	Mega Manila Rating
October 12, 2009	1	10	28.9%
October 12, 2009	Carding confronts Mimi about whether she is really trying to manipulate them but she convinces him that she is not. Menang holds a party and Luisa is asked to help. Luisa meets with Cading in the bathroom but they are not found out of sheer luck. Carding and Luisa overhear Mimi telling her friends about her plans to manipulate them. Carding now believes Luisa's warning that he should not trust Mimi.		
October 13, 2009	1	11	28.9%
October 13, 2009	Carding picks a fight with Diego outside Luisa's house. Luisa's family is mad at Carding. Carding goes home angry but lies to his mother that it is because Mimi rejected him. Luisa goes with her mother to Mimi's house as she had lied about still working there. Carding goes to see Luisa to explain that he had lied to his mother about Mimi being his girlfriend. They hug each other and promise to see each other later to celebrate Luisa's birthday. Unfortunately Mimi overhears and later manipulates Idad to pick up Luisa to go home. Mimi feels happy knowing that Carding will wait all night for Luisa in vain.		
October 14, 2009	1	12	28.9%
October 14, 2009	Carding goes to Luisa's home to give her his present. Tomas sees them but he understands. Carding and Luisa meet but they change their venue knowing that Mimi had discovered their old one. Carding and Luisa bump into Menang and Carding accepts that Luisa is his girlfriend. Menang is furious with them, especially Luisa who she refers to as a gold digger. Idad is mad at Luisa for lying to her and being together with Carding. She grounds Luisa. Carding goes to Luisa's house to beg them to forgive Luisa but he is not welcomed there.		
October 15, 2009	1	13	28. 9%
October 15, 2009	Idad goes to warn Menang but they start arguing. Menang starts throwing harsh words about poor people. Carding writes a letter to Luisa as he misses her a lot. Menang's campaign is backfiring because of her harsh words to Idad. She is forced to apologize to Idad.		

=== Week 5 ===
Original airdate	Season	Episode #	Mega Manila Rating
October 19, 2009	1	14	28.9%
October 19, 2009	Luisa's family decide that it is better to take Luisa to her grandmother's place in the province so that Carding cannot contact her. Cading tries to catch up with them but Luisa is gone. Mimi is happy about the news that Luisa is gone.		
October 20, 2009	1	15	28.9%
October 20, 2009	Luisa is left in the province with her grandmother and aunt to study. Carding is given the news that a letter was sent to Peping (Luisa's youngest brother) from the province where Luisa is. Carding goes to see Luisa. Luisa breaks up with Carding. It starts to rain and they are caught up in the storm. They seek shelter in a cave. Their families are worried and news goes around that they have eloped. Afraid of Carding mother, and understanding Luisa's reason, Idad is pretending to be mad at Luisa and warns her to never come back since she betrayed her family.		
October 21, 2009	1	16	28.9%
October 21, 2009	Everyone is talking about Carding and Luisa. Luisa's family is still angry at her. But, Luisa's told her family that the reason why she was close to Carding, since she was got blame herself when Carding got an accident. Idad hear this, but didn't talk to Luisa. Menang is angry too, but to boost her position in the election for mayor, she decides that Carding and Luisa should marry. Luisa accepts the proposal. Mimi is disappointed but Menang tells her that she will make the marriage fail after she wins the election.		
October 22, 2009	1	17	28.9%
October 22, 2009	On the day of Carding and Luisa's wedding, everyone attends except Idad and Totoy who are still mad at Luisa. it was discover that they were not mad at Luisa, they were pretend to be mad at her, in order to not get in trouble for angry at Carding. Totoy on other hand, had kept the promise to Luisa for their dreams in secret, until when she separates with Carding. They both understand Luisa's words. Mimi and Menang form a plan. As soon as Carding and Luisa come back from their honeymoon, Menang tells Carding that he must attend college and accompany Mimi. Luisa is left in the hands of Menang who informs her that she will have to follow her rules and orders in her house.		

=== Week 6 ===
Original airdate	Season	Episode #	Mega Manila Rating
October 26, 2009	1	18	30.1%
October 26, 2009	Life for Luisa is terrible at Carding's house due to Menang's cruel treatment. Menang even tells Carding that Luisa is lazy and does nothing around the house. Menang and Luisa attend election campaigns but Luisa is given nothing to eat. Idad overhears Menang telling Madam Carmen that Luisa is lazy and does nothing. Mimi overhears Carding telling Alex (his cousin) that he loves Luisa because her simple and sweet nature make her unique. Mimi tries to emulate Luisa by dressing like her. Menang confronts Luisa and hits her after Luisa overhears her telling David that she is broke. Luisa stands up to Menang and tells her that she won't let her mistreat her again because she is not stupid and that the poor have their principles too.		
October 27, 2009	1	19	28.9%
October 27, 2009	Menang takes Luisa shopping to please the public by dressing her well. Carding comes to visit during the weekend and Luisa tells him she is afraid of his mother. He asks his mother and she pretends that she will try not to intimidate her anymore and be patient with her. Luisa's family is breaking apart with Idad and Tomas constantly away at work but Peping comes up with an idea and they patch things up. When Carding leaves for school, Menang drags Luisa into the house but Diego sees Menang mistreating her.		
October 28, 2009	1	20	28.9%
October 28, 2009	Idad falls sick and is taken to hospital. Luisa hears but Menang forbids her to leave the house. She sneaks out. Idad needs a blood transfusion and Luisa donates her blood to save her mother. When Luisa gets home later she is confronted by Menang. Carding hurries home on hearing that Luisa is gone. On entering the house he finds his mother on the floor and he thinks that Luisa pushed her over. Saling visits Luisa by sneaking into the house and discovers that Luisa is mistreated. Luisa begs her not to tell her parents. As Saling and Diego talk about Luisa, Tomas overhears and runs to Menang's house to demand if Luisa is being mistreated.		
October 29, 2009	1	21	28.9%
October 29, 2009	Menang uses David to get Luisa's father fired from work. Luisa's father tries desperately to get another job to no avail. Luisa tries to get one too but cannot because everyone thinks she is rich. Carding is having difficulty at college. Mimi takes advantage of this and tutors Carding, who passes his exams.		

=== Week 7 ===
Original airdate	Season	Episode #	Mega Manila Rating
November 2, 2009	1	22	30.1%
November 2, 2009	Luisa is warned not to do anything mischievous or else she will face dire consequences. Saling comes to see her but Luisa accuses her of breaking her promise not to tell anyone her secret. Later Diego visits Luisa to clear things up between her and Saling but Menang sees them and forwards a picture to Carding. Carding calls Luisa and warns her that she is never see Diego again or else he will get hurt. Peping tells Idad that Luisa donated the blood to keep her alive. Idad is mad that they never told her. Jojo is trying to make Totoy jealous by pretending to go out with her friend. Totoy is heartbroken but can't do anything. Diego visits Luisa again. Menang suspects Luisa is talking to a man even though she hasn't seen who it is. Carding ignores Luisa's calls and goes out partying with Mimi. He becomes drunk and Mimi takes him home. While he is drunk Carding repeatedly calls out for Luisa and says that he really loves her. Mimi cries and pretends to be Luisa and kisses Carding. The next morning Carding does remember anything. Mimi manipulates Carding and implies that he slept with her, although they didn't.		
November 3, 2009	1	23	28.9%
November 3, 2009	Carding feels guilty about going home to his wife. Mimi locks herself in her room after Carding tells her that they can no longer be friends. She pretends to commit suicide. Carding feels guilty and spends time with Mimi. He doesn't return home. Luisa and Menang go to church and where they meet Luisa's family. Idad talks to Luisa, who is very happy about this. Luisa asks David to help her father get a job but he refuses as he cannot get anything out of it. Carding and Mimi visit home for the weekend but Carding avoids Luisa. Mimi she invites Carding to a pretend pool party in order to swim with Carding. Menang finds out and calls Luisa to see what is happening. Luisa sees Carding bending over Mimi who pretended to have drowned.		
November 4, 2009	1	24	28.9%
November 4, 2009	Luisa apologises for doubting Carding and Mimi. Carding claims that he was mad when he saw her and Diego together. He warns her that she should never see Diego again. After Carding returns to college, Luisa decides to surprise him with a visit. Carding introduces Luisa to his friends as "Luisa" and as not his wife, which upsets her. Mimi tries to get Carding to attend a party that he previously agreed to go to. Luisa does not have much fun at the party while Carding dances with Mimi. At Tomas's request, Idad goes to visit Luisa to forgive her. Luisa is not home. Idad leaves a message with the kind housekeeper that Luisa is invited to celebrate Tomas's birthday with the family that evening. Luisa wants to go home to attend her father's birthday party. Carding tries to leave but his friends convince him to stay longer and he doesn't hear Luisa. Luisa walks to the bus station where she is attacked on the street. Luckily Diego was also going to the station and rescues her. Luisa and Diego talk the bus together home. At Luisa's place, the family is preparing for Tomas's birthday. Tomas is buying gifts for his family but on the way home he gets a heart attack. He cannot move off the railway and gets run over by the train and dies.		
November 5, 2009	1	25	28.9%
November 5, 2009	Menang attends Tomas's funeral but Luisa is angry with her because she blames her for Tomas's death. Luisa stays with her family. Idad forgives Luisa, and Luisa discover that she was pretending to be mad at her, so that she will not get in trouble for against Carding, the day when the news as people thinks that Luisa and Carding were eloped, from the hands of Menang. Luisa confronts Menang in the street and blames her for being responsible for her father's death. Carding doesn't know whether to side with Luisa or his mother. He decides to go back to the city. Menang goes further by getting Totoy fired. Luisa is furious and publicly claims war against Menang.		

=== Week 8 ===
Original airdate	Season	Episode #	Mega Manila Rating
November 9, 2009	1	26	30.1%
November 9, 2009	Menang loses the election. She loses all her friends, even her campaign advisor. She blames Luisa for all this and swears revenge. Luisa and Carding are having problems. Idad tells her that she should go back and fix everything since marriage is not an easy road. Carding keeps doubting Luisa.		
November 10, 2009	1	27	28.9%
November 10, 2009	Carmen asks Luisa why Menang is mad at her and she learns that Luisa is being mistreated. Menang locks Luisa in a room but she escapes and goes to her place. Carding tries to convince Luisa to go back to the mansion but she refuses and Idad tells him to leave. Diego has feelings for Luisa and she senses that. Totoy goes to the city and he is lucky to find a new job. As Totoy is with his boss and her child in a shopping mall he sees Carding and Mimi flirting.		
November 11, 2009	1	28	28.9%
November 11, 2009	Luisa doesn't believe Totoy ween he tells her that he saw Carding and Mimi flirting. She asks Carding about it and he gives an excuse. While Diego is drunk he tries to rape Luisa on her way to see Saling. Saling saves her and they report him to the police. Diego is arrested. Luisa is pregnant with Carding's child. Menang burns down her house in order to get insurance money. It is discovered that she started the fire. She becomes injured and has nowhere to go. Idad welcomes them into their place but Menang is too proud to accept. Mimi finds out about the pregnancy. She offers Diego money to lie that he and Luisa were having an affair and that it is his baby.		
November 12, 2009	1	29	28.9%
November 12, 2009	Diego dies and Luisa receives a letter from Carding for a divorce. Mimi plans for the eviction of Luisa's family and Alex overhears it. Mimi is told by the doctor that she will never bear children. Alex knocks Luisa over to hurt the baby but she recovers. Totoy discover the news what happen to his sister, this caused to forgive her, as Luisa knew that he kept a promise to her to make their family dreams come true. Jojo asks Mimi about the agreement between her and Diego but Mimi refuses to tell. When Jojo tries to tell Carding, Mimi tries to strangle Jojo[Jojo attempted to fight back but Mimi is to strong for to her handle] . Jojo's friend comes to save her. They go to report her but Mimi has beaten them to it. It is discovered that Alex is the one who knocked Luisa over.		

=== Week 9 ===
Original airdate	Season	Episode #	Mega Manila Rating
November 16, 2009	1	30	30.1%
November 16, 2009	Jojo and Alex tells Carding everything. He visits Mimi in the hospital and overhears her friends threatening to tell all about her evil deeds. Carding then tells her to stay away from him and his mother. He and Menang finally discover Mimi's lies and regrets for what they have done to Luisa knowing that she is right all along. Although, Menang ask him to move on, but he refused since Luisa is pregnant with his child. Mimi's plan backfires and she is jailed by the authorities for conspiracy into committing murder, Mimi begins to be abused by the other inmates. She is bailed out by Carmen (her mother), which proves to be her undoing as Mimi sets out get revenge on Luisa. Menang asks for forgiveness from Luisa and she is even taken in to stay with them. Mimi storms into Luisa's house and tries to kill her[even attempting to stab her with a scissor] Luisa can barely fight back against her due to her pregnancy. Luckily Carding arrives on time to save her but Mimi knocks him unconscious with a tire iron. Mimi tries to kill herself and Carding[seeing that if she can't have him, no one will] and they are involved in an accident. Carding recovers and Luisa forgives him, but Mimi ends her legs being amputated as a result and is sentenced to prison for the rest of her life for her crimes and misdeeds. Carding and Luisa have a baby girl and they live happily ever after. Totoy owns a restaurant in St Louise and finally courts Jojo. The Promise of Luisa and Totoy come true to their family. END		

== Soundtracks ==
- Gulong ng Palad – main theme song (performed by Jerome Sala)
- Hindi Ko Kayang Iwan Ka / Sa Piling Mo (performed by Sheryn Regis)
- Dahil Mahal na Mahal Kita (performed by Rachelle Ann Go)

== See also ==
- List of ABS-CBN Studios original drama series
- List of programs broadcast by ABS-CBN
