= Madeleine Humphries =

Filipino actress (born 1988)

- Born: Madeleine Lauren Humphries (Note: Madeleine Humphries was born in the United States. Thus, she does not possess her mother's maiden name.); May 20, 1988 (age 38); San Francisco, California, U.S.
- Other name: Carla Humphries
- Occupations: Actress; model
- Years active: 2003–present
- Agents: Star Magic (2003–2009); Viva Artists Agency (2013–present)
- Height: 1.7 m (5 ft 7 in)

Madeleine Lauren Humphries (born May 20, 1988), known professionally as Madeleine Humphries and formerly as Carla Humphries is a French-Filipino actress. Humphries is best known for her roles as Rita Arguelles in the television drama Bituing Walang Ningning (2006), and as Brenda Smith in the youth-oriented program Abt Ur Luv (2006). She also appeared on the January 2011 cover of FHM Philippines Magazine.

Humphries was a member of Star Magic, ABS-CBN's circle of homegrown talents from 2003 to early 2009. In March 2010, she joined TV5's line-up of talents. In 2013, she starred in the action film 10,000 Hours alongside Robin Padilla where she was nominated for Best Supporting Actress.

== Early life ==
Madeleine Lauren Humphries was born in San Francisco, California to a Filipina mother and a French-American father of Italian descent. Humphries is the second of four children; she and older brother Alec were born in the United States, while her two younger siblings Nicolas and Samantha were born in France and the Philippines, respectively.

== Career ==
=== Early career ===
Humphries was discovered in 1999 at the age of 11 by Johnny Manahan, the director of the ABS-CBN Talent Center (now known as Star Magic) She was invited to join the Talent Center's acting workshops and audition as a Talent Center artist after Manahan saw her perform in her school's Recognition Day program.

Humphries attended workshops in various disciplines, including acting, singing, and personality development over the course of two years. She was accepted and launched as a member of Star Circle Batch 11 in May 2003.

After her launch, Humphries began appearing in one-time guest supporting roles on various shows on the ABS-CBN network. Her first recurring guest role came in late 2003, when she was cast as a fashion model named "Paris" in the youth-oriented TV show Berks. In the show, Paris subsequently became the girlfriend of Berks regular, Ketchup (portrayed by Ketchup Eusebio). The role would be the first time Humphries is paired with a comedian, a pattern that is later repeated in the TV show Qpids.

In 2004, Humphries appeared in a supporting role in her first movie, My First Romance, as a friend of the lead character portrayed by Heart Evangelista. She was also cast that same year in her first primetime recurring guest role as "Penelope" in the TV series Sarah the Teen Princess where she was positioned as a romantic rival of the show's lead character portrayed by Sarah Geronimo.

In 2005, Humphries was cast in ABS-CBN's Reality Loveteam Search Qpids in 2005, where she and her loveteam partner Janus del Prado emerged as the Qpids Voter's Choice for receiving the most votes from viewers through phone calls and SMS text messages. Qpids was where the stage name "Carla Humphries-Loren" was first used, with the intent to eventually transition her stage name to "Carla Loren" ostensibly to improve her name recall among Filipino viewers. After Qpids, however, Humphries continued to be credited as "Carla Humphries."

In 2006, Humphries and loveteam partner Janus del Prado were cast in the Langis episode of Maalaala Mo Kaya, a drama anthology on ABS-CBN, where Humphries' performance garnered glowing reviews from the local entertainment press.

In the same year, Humphries was cast as "Rita Arguelles" in the primetime drama series Bituing Walang Ningning, which starred Sarah Geronimo and Angelika dela Cruz. The series ran for 21 weeks during which time one of her shampoo commercials also began airing in the Philippines.

Humphries also appeared that same year in supporting roles in two well-received Star Cinema movies, D' Lucky Ones and First Day High.

Humphries was also cast as one of the four lead characters in the youth-oriented TV series Star Magic Presents: Abt Ur Luv, which began airing in November 2006. The show launched her new loveteam with Victor Basa, won Best Youth Oriented Program at the 21st PMPC Star Awards (2007), and aired a total of 57 episodes. The series finale aired on January 5, 2008.

In 2008, Humphries joined the cast of Palos—a primetime action / drama TV series on the ABS-CBN network where she was cast as a medical doctor who also happens to be the First Daughter of the Republic of the Philippines. The role is a departure from the teen and youth-oriented roles that Humphries has portrayed since her launch as a Star Magic artist in 2003.

After Palos ended, Humphries also appeared on Ligaw na Bulaklak, an afternoon drama series that began airing on the ABS-CBN network in May 2008.

Humphries was handpicked to play Joanna Bonifacio in Smaller and Smaller Circles, based on the crime novel of the same name.

In 2019, she appeared in the Greenpeace Philippines short film Before We Disappear where she was first credited using her current screen name.

=== Print and on-cam modelling ===
In 2003 shortly after her launch, Humphries began appearing in local style and fashion magazines intended for the teen market.

In 2004, she landed her first magazine cover with Pink and appeared for the first time in Metro Weddings, an upscale magazine targeted at the bridal market. Also in the same year, Humphries appeared in her first TV commercial for Globe Telecom's GenTxt club.

In 2006, she landed her first multi-country TV commercial for Sunsilk shampoo. Her commercials were aired in 6 countries in the Asian region.

In 2009, she appeared in another Globe TV commercial. featuring the mobile company's postpaid phone plans.

In 2011, she was on the cover of the January issue of FHM Philippines.

== Personal life ==
=== Education ===
Humphries studied in French schools until her mother transferred her to the ABS-CBN Distance Learning Center (DLC) in Manila, where she obtained her high school diploma.

She enrolled and attended one year at the University of Santo Tomas to study fine arts, before transferring to the Centre for International Education (CIE) to study entrepreneurship, whose more flexible schedule allowed her to pursue her acting career without giving up her studies.

Humphries also holds a Gemology Institute of America (GIA) Jewelry Design Certificate after completing the 9-week Jewelry Design class at the GIA in Bangkok, Thailand.

=== Interests ===
Humphries dabbles in both music and art, and at one point entertained the idea of working in a museum or a gallery. She has been painting since she was eight years old: "I have always loved drawing and was always best in drawing in school. After that, I did after-class painting workshops. I love painting abstracts and landscapes. My works either reflect me, or they're sceneries. But I don't consider myself a professional."

== Filmography ==
=== Film ===
| Year | Title | Role | Notes | Source |
|---|---|---|---|---|
| 2004 | My First Romance | Angel Guia | | |
| 2006 | First Day High | Christine | | |
| 2006 | D' Lucky Ones | Yammy | | |
| 2007 | A Love Story | Ava | | |
| 2008 | For the First Time | Marianne | | |
| 2009 | Ang Tanging Pamilya: A Marry Go Round | Andi | Listed as "Introducing" | |
| 2013 | Bekikang: Ang Nanay Kong Beki | Natalie | | |
| 2013 | 10,000 Hours | Isabelle Manahan | | |
| 2015 | Flotsam | Mia | | |
| 2015 | Felix Manalo | Pilar Manalo Danao | | |
| 2017 | Nay | | | |
| 2017 | Smaller and Smaller Circles | Joanna Bonifacio | | |
| 2018 | The Significant Other | | | |
| 2019 | Before We Disappear | | Short film First credited as "Madeleine Humphries" | |
| 2020 | Isa Pang Bahaghari | Atty. Arlene Balmes | | |
| 2021 | The Hunt: Savage Within | Sarah | Short film | |

=== Television ===
| Year | Title | Role | Notes | Source |
|---|---|---|---|---|
| 2003 | Maalaala Mo Kaya | Girlfriend | Episode: "Bonnet" | |
| 2003—present | ASAP | Herself | Co-Host / Performer | |
| 2003 | Tara Tena | Sandra | Episode: "Mukha ng Pag-ibig" | |
| 2003 | Sana'y Wala Nang Wakas | Secretary | | |
| 2003 | Berks | Paris | | |
| 2004 | Wansapanataym | Jennifer | Episode: "Magic Paintbrush" | |
| 2004 | Tara Tena | Best Friend | Episode: "Smart Joker, Sweet Lover" | |
| 2004 | Marina | Young Lorelei | | |
| 2004 | Wansapanataym | Garden Fairy | Episode: "Hardin ng Mga Wenekleks" | |
| 2004 | Wazzup Wazzup | Mindy / Tadjock | | |
| 2004 | Sarah The Teen Princess | Penelope | | |
| 2004 | Wansapanataym | Singing Angel | Episode: "Ang Wish ko ay Sumapit" | |
| 2005 | Qpids | Herself | | |
| 2005 | Vietnam Rose | Young Editha dela Cerna | Special Participation | |
| 2006 | Maalaala Mo Kaya | Lani | Episode: "Langis"' | |
| 2006 | Your Song Presents: I'll Never Get Over You Getting Over Me | Erica | | |
| 2006 | Pangarap at Tagumpay: Mga Kuwento sa Likod ng Wowowee | Edwin's wife | TV special, "The Edwin Sumampong" story | |
| 2006 | Komiks Presents: Ang Sandok ni Boninay | Fairy | | |
| 2006 | Bituing Walang Ningning | Rita Arguelles | | |
| 2006 | Star Magic Presents: My Angel | Shane | | |
| 2006 | Your Song Presents: Panalangin | Jessica | | |
| 2006—2008 | Star Magic Presents: Abt Ur Luv | Brenda Smith | | |
| 2007 | Your Song Presents: Tuyo na'ng Damdamin | Mira | | |
| 2007 | Your Song Presents: Kasalanan Ko Ba | Jen | | |
| 2007 | Komiks Presents: Da Adventures of Pedro Penduko | Cynthia | | |
| 2008 | Star Magic Presents: Abt Ur Luv: Ur Lyf 2 | Brenda Smith | Left the show for Palos. | |
| 2008 | Maalaala Mo Kaya | Pamela | Episode: "Hair Clip" | |
| 2008 | Palos | Dr. Stella Guidotti | | |
| 2008 | Lovespell | Jinky | Episode: "Credit Card" | |
| 2008 | Your Song Presents: Without You | Olive | | |
| 2008 | Ligaw na Bulaklak | Precious | | |
| 2009 | Midnight DJ | Denise | Episode: "Demon Cellphone Number" | |
| 2009 | Only You | Agnes Aguirre | | |
| 2009 | Everybody Hapi | Dyesebel | Guest, 1 episode | |
| 2009 | Precious Hearts Romances Presents: Ang Lalaking Nagmahal Sa Akin | Sophie Mendez | | |
| 2010 | Maalaala Mo Kaya | Josephine (Corazon Aquino's sister) | Episode: "Kalapati" | |
| 2010 | Precious Hearts Romances Presents: The Substitute Bride | Candra dela Rosa | | |
| 2010 | P.O.5 | Herself / co-host | | |
| 2010 | Everybody Hapi | Erika Pulgado | | |
| 2010 | 5 Star Specials Presents: Ruffa Gutierrez | | Miniseries: "Who's the Boss" | |
| 2010 | 5 Star Specials Presents: JC De Vera | | Miniseries: "Johnny Salamangkero" | |
| 2010 | My Driver Sweet Lover | Coleen | | |
| 2011 | Mga Nagbabagang Bulaklak | Camella / Ivy Amor / Irish | | |
| 2012 | Felina: Prinsesa ng mga Pusa | Chloe | | |
| 2014 | The Legal Wife | Audrey | | |
| 2015 | Pablo S. Gomez's Inday Bote | Marice Vargas-Delgado | Special Participation | |
| 2015 | Bridges Of Love | Ivanka Vallera | | |
| 2015 | InstaDad | Trina Dominguez | | |
| 2015 | Nathaniel | Young Angela "AVL" Laxamana | Special Participation | |
| 2015 | Ipaglaban Mo! | Susie | Episode: "Pusong Mapanlinlang" | |
| 2015 | FPJ's Ang Probinsyano | Teacher Ophelia | Special Participation | |
| 2016 | A1 Ko Sa 'Yo | Destiny | Guest | |
| 2017 | Ikaw Lang ang Iibigin | Young Maila Salcedo | Special Participation | |
| 2017 | Pusong Ligaw | Lauren | | |
| 2017 | Maalaala Mo Kaya | Milet | Episode: Tulay | |
| 2018 | The Diary of a 30 Something | | | |
| 2018 | The Stepdaughters | Aileen | | |
| 2026 | Call My Manager | Rina | | |

=== Theater ===
| Year | Title | Role | Notes | Source |
|---|---|---|---|---|
| 2015 | No Filter 2.0 | | | |

=== Music videos ===
| Year | Title | Artist(s) | Role | Source |
|---|---|---|---|---|
| 2003 | "Bongga Ka 'Day" | The Akafellas | | |
| 2005 | "Dito sa Puso Ko" | Nikki Gil and Josh Santana | | |
| 2005 | "Change is Breaking Us Apart" | The Dawn | | |
| 2006 | "Ang Ganda Ko" | Sandara Park | | |
| 2010 | "Naaalala Ka" | Jericho Rosales | | |

== Awards and nominations ==
| Year | Work | Award | Category | Result | Source |
|---|---|---|---|---|---|
| 2013 | 10,000 Hours | Metro Manila Film Festival | Best Supporting Actress | Nominated | |
