= Smaller and Smaller Circles (film) =

- Theatrical release poster
- Directed by: Raya Martin
- Screenplay by: Ria Limjap; Moira Lang
- Based on: Smaller and Smaller Circles by F. H. Batacan
- Produced by: Ria Limjap; Moira Lang
- Starring: Nonie Buencamino; Sid Lucero; Carla Humphries; Gladys Reyes; Ricky Davao; Bembol Roco; TJ Trinidad; Christopher de Leon; Tessie Tomas
- Cinematography: J.A. Tadena
- Edited by: Jay Halili
- Music by: Lutgardo Labad; Odoni Pestelos
- Production company: TBA Studios
- Distributed by: Tuko Film Productions (Philippines); Columbia Pictures (United States)
- Release date: December 6, 2017 (Philippines)
- Running time: 113 minutes
- Country: Philippines
- Languages: Filipino; English

Smaller and Smaller Circles is a 2017 Philippine drama mystery horror film directed by Raya Martin from a screenplay by Ria Limjap and Moira Lang, based on the 2002 novel of the same name by F. H. Batacan. The film stars Nonie Buencamino and Sid Lucero as Jesuit priests and forensic investigators Gus Saenz and Jerome Lucero, Carla Humphries as journalist Joanna Bonifacio, with Gladys Reyes, Ricky Davao, Bembol Roco, TJ Trinidad, Christopher De Leon and Tessie Tomas in supporting roles.

This is also the last film appearance of Joy Viado, who died of a heart attack in Diliman, Quezon City on September 10, 2016, at the age of 57.

In 2020, TBA Studios uploaded on its official YouTube channel the entire film adaptation of Smaller and Smaller Circles with English subtitles.

== Plot ==
In 1997, a body of a teenage boy was found in the Payatas dumpsite, Quezon City. Father Augusto "Gus" Saenz, a forensic investigator and Jesuit priest, was asked by Francisco Lastimosa; an NBI deputy director, to investigate the murder. While investigating, both Gus and Father Jerome Lucero, another Jesuit priest, found a pattern with the murder spree that happened within the last few months, that the murders most likely happened during Saturdays and that the method of murdering the victims were done by a professional because of the surgical precision as to how the faces, hearts, and genitals were removed.

While the priests were investigating, Cardinal Rafael Meneses and Lastimosa were interviewed at a talk show, with the questions becoming more tense until Deputy Director Lastimosa fell unconscious and was sent to the hospital, thus being temporarily replaced by Deputy Director Mapa. Atty. Arcinas was assigned to investigate the recent murders and they arrested Carding, a local who works at the local parish by delivering food to the parish. Both Gus and Jerome raised doubts on the veracity of the arrest as the evidence was inconclusive, so they asked people such as Rommel, who knew Carding to gain additional clues.

The two priests were invited to an opera at the CCP and there they encountered Cardinal Meneses and Mrs. Urrutia, the head of a children's charity. Mrs. Urrutia confronted Gus as Gus warned her of Monsignor Ramirez, a priest who allegedly molests children, and the pair left after the tense conversation. After the opera, the pair went into a bar and they encountered Joanna again. Joanna gave the pair clues as she revealed that Hon. Mariano, the councilor, has a mobile health clinic and thus could help identify the other victims the murders still continued even though Carding was arrested.

Deputy Director Lastimosa chastised both Deputy Director Mapa and Atty. Arcinas for the flaws during the investigation. Both Gus and Jerome went to Hon. Mariano and they went to the mobile health clinic to identify the other victims. The pair gained a lead when they were able to identify a potential suspect, Dr. Alejandro "Alex" Carlos, a dentist who came from Payatas and graduate of UP Manila. The pair asked people who knew him. Alex barged into the health clinic and stole some medical tools from Dr. Gino, the person the pair interviewed earlier.

Alex attempted to murder a student walking home but was unable to as the student called for help and Alex was beaten up by a witness. Alex killed Rommel and then hid in a building, mutilating himself. Gus and the investigative team went to the building where Alex was hiding and Gus was able to find him, sitting bloodied on the floor. While Gus was offering to pray for Alex, he was stabbed by Alex and he escaped from the building.

Gus was able to recover from his injuries and Alex was found dead at Payatas, with multiple self-inflicted stab wounds. While Gus was recovering, Guillermo "Emong" Ricafrente came to talk to him. It was revealed that he, Alex, and a few other boys were sexually molested by their PE teacher, with Alex being the worst victim of them all. Deputy Director Lastimosa talked to Mrs. Urrutia to reveal that Msgr. Ramirez was misappropriating charity funds. Joanna talked to Gus about a case involving a man named Solano.

== Cast ==
- Nonie Buencamino as Father Augusto Saenz, SJ
- Sid Lucero as Father Jerome Lucero, SJ
- Carla Humphries as Joanna Bonifacio
- Jun-jun Quintana as Dr. Alex Carlos
- Gladys Reyes as Hon. Tess Mariano
- Ricky Davao as Cardinal Rafael Meneses
- Bembol Roco as NBI Deputy Director Francisco Lastimosa
- Christopher de Leon as NBI Deputy Director Phillip Mapa
- TJ Trinidad as Deputy Jake Valdez
- Raffy Tejada as Atty. Benjamin Arcinas
- Tessie Tomas as Gilda Salceda
- Alex Medina as Carding
- Roselyn Perez as Mrs. Urrutia
- Joy Viado as Assistant to Atty. Arcinas

== Production ==
Several scenes in the film were shot on location at the Ateneo de Manila University.

== Release ==
The film debuted in theaters in the Philippines on December 6, 2017.

The film was made available on YouTube starting May 20, 2020.
