= Silayan =

Silayan is a Filipino surname. Notable people with the surname include:

- Chat Silayan (1959–2006), Filipino beauty queen and actress
- Vic Silayan (1929–1987), Filipino actor, father of Chat
- Victor Silayan (born 1992), Filipino actor and TV commercial model, grandson of Vic and nephew of Chat
