= Maria Flordeluna =

- Title card
- Genre: Drama; Romance; Action; Military fiction
- Created by: ABS-CBN Studios; Star Cinema
- Based on: Flordeluna by Marcos Navarro Sacol
- Written by: Arah Jell Badayos; Mary Rose Colindres; Arden Condez
- Directed by: Jerry Lopez Sineneng; Rechie del Carmen
- Starring: Eliza Pineda
- Music by: Jessie Lasaten
- Opening theme: "Maria Flordeluna" by Sheryn Regis
- Composers: Arden Condez; Jonathan Manalo
- Country of origin: Philippines
- Original language: Tagalog
- No. of episodes: 93

Production
- Executive producers: Carlo Katigbak; Cory Vidanes; Laurenti Dyogi; Malou Santos
- Producers: Minnella T. Abad; Myleen Ongkiko
- Production location: Metro Manila
- Running time: 20-30 minutes
- Production company: Star Creatives

Original release
- Network: ABS-CBN
- Release: February 12 – June 22, 2007

Related
- Flordeluna (Book 1: 1978–1983; Book 2: 1987–1988)

Maria Flordeluna is a 2007 Philippine television drama series broadcast by ABS-CBN. Directed by Jerry Lopez Sineneng and Rechie del Carmen, it stars Eliza Pineda in the title role. The series is based on the 1970s radio drama Flordeluna, written by Marcos Navarro Sacol and its television adaptation by RPN in 1978, starring Janice de Belen in the title role. It aired on the network's Primetime Bida line up from February 12 to June 22, 2007, replacing Super Inggo and was replaced by Ysabella.

== Premise ==
It tells the story of the title character, an 11-year-old girl, and her efforts in bringing her family together against all odds.

== Cast and characters ==
Protagonist

- Eliza Pineda as Ma. Flordeluna "Flor" Aragoncillo-Alicante†

Main cast

- Eula Valdez as Josephine "Jo" Espero-Alicante
- Albert Martinez as Gen. Leo Alicante / Leo Aragoncillo-Alvarado
- John Estrada as Gary "Spider" Alvarado
- Vina Morales as Ma. Elvira Aragoncillo-Alicante†
- Liza Lorena as Brigida "Mamita" Espero
- Alwyn Uytingco as Jacob Charles "JC" Custodio
- Jill Yulo as Annie Natividad
- Johnny Delgado† as Ret. Gen. Carlos Alvarado
- Roldan Aquino† as Tibor Natividad
- Nash Aguas as Renato Manuel "Rene Boy" Aragoncillo-Alicante
- Kristel Fulgar as Wilma Espero
- Minnie Aguilar as Soling

Supporting cast

- Mark Dionisio as Lt. Col. Isagani Fernandez
- Frances Ignacio as Marie Cuanio
- Menggie Cobarrubias† as General Torres
- Neil Ryan Sese as Adolfo Perez†
- Cheena Crab as Greta
- Darius Cardano as Mark
- Johann Nicdao as Marco
- Peewee O'Hara as Iya: She is JC's yaya or nanny who helps him and Annie realize their feelings for each other.
- Dennis Coronel as Captain Castro†
- Nikki Bagaporo as Angel: She is Flor's best friend at school.
- Ariel Reonal as Ariel Trono: He's a television news correspondent who reports on the controversy about Leo Alicante and Gary/Spider and later on contacts the latter for a price.

Guest cast

- Carlo Artillaga as Leo's Lawyer
- Bing Davao as Young Carlos
- Mika Dela Cruz as Julia E. Alicante
- Patrick Dela Rosa† as Allan
- Gabb Drillon as Teenage Gary
- Franzen Fajardo as Enteng
- Mar Garchitorena as Governor Aragoncillo
- Tanya Gomez as Teresita V. Alicante
- Nanding Josef as Mang Jose
- Mike Lloren as Max
- Ricky Rivero† as Police Investigator
- Yul Servo as Danillo Ferrer
- Yvette Taguera as Lias

Radio cast

There was the voice cast of the radio version of Maria Flordeluna which was broadcast weekdays at 2:30PM on DZMM. It ended to make way for MMK sa DZMM.

- Roxanne Manato as Ma. Flordeluna Alicante
- Christian Alvear as Renato Manuel "Rene Boy" Alicante
- Mary Joy Adorable as Wilma Espero
- Rosanna Villegas as Jo Espero
- Danny Depante as Leo Alicante
- Abby Masilongan as Elvira Aragoncillo-Alicante
- Eric Galvez as Gary Alvarado

== Theme songs ==
The series theme song is "Maria Flordeluna" and was written by Arden Condez and Jonathan Manalo. It was composed and arranged by Jonathan Manalo and is performed by Sheryn Regis. The song was nominated for a 2007 Awit Award.

There are also two love themes: "Hanggang May Kailanman" performed by Vina Morales, but originally performed by Carol Banawa (both versions were used on the show) and "Lihim" performed by Acel Bisa. Also used during the show is a version of "Lihim" sung by Alwyn Uytingco and Jill Yulo.

== Reception ==
Maria Flordeluna was the only primetime drama series in 2007 on either ABS-CBN or GMA to have gained viewers through the duration of its whole run, registering 42.3% based on average monthly nationwide ratings). Its series finale overtook the final episode of the Philippine remake of Marimar on GMA in the same year to become the highest rated program on Philippine television in terms of national scale viewership since AGB Nielsen Philippines' introduction of its nationwide urban television audience measurement (NUTAM) service in October 2006, registering a final rating of 49.3%. The show's finale was notable during the same period that GMA's viewership lead in Mega Manila was pitted against ABS-CBN's dominant audience shares in both Visayas and Mindanao in the combined nationwide ratings.

== Accolades ==
=== The 21st Star Awards for Television ===
The series was nominated for Best Primetime Drama Series at the 21st Star Awards for Television, given by The Philippine Movie Press Club.

=== The 20th Awit Awards 2007 ===
The theme song, "Maria Flordeluna," was nominated in the category of Best Song Written for Movie/TV/Stage Play.

=== Catholic Mass Media Awards 2008 ===
The series is nominated for Best Drama Series/Program against fellow ABS-CBN series Lobo and Maalaala Mo Kaya.

== Production ==
More than 1,000 young actresses auditioned for the role of Maria Flordeluna which eventually went to Eliza Pineda. The pilot episode aired for approximately one hour and 20 minutes on Monday, February 12, 2007. The finale episode had a runtime of approximately 45 minutes (excluding commercials).

- The original role was played by TV host and actress Janice de Belen.
- The story was written by Loida Virina, who also made Gulong ng Palad. Both her serials were very successful and remade on ABS-CBN.
- The 1970s version ran for 10 years, while the 2007 version ran for 4 months.
- Eliza Pineda and Kristel Fulgar were together for the second time after the drama series Bituin, as the young Desiree Del Valle (Eliza) and young Carol Banawa (Kristel).
