= Basta't Kasama Kita =

2003–04 Philippine television drama series

- Title card
- Genre: Action; Comedy; Drama; Romance; Suspense
- Created by: ABS-CBN Studios
- Developed by: ABS-CBN Studios; Star Cinema
- Written by: Galo Ador Jr.; Rondel Lindayag; Alejandro "Bong" Ramos; Ronald Tabuyo; Albert Langitan; John Roque; Bienvenido "Ben" Ojeda
- Directed by: Jerry Lopez Sinning; Trina N. Dayrit
- Starring: Judy Ann Santos; Robin Padilla
- Opening theme: "Basta't Kasama Kita" by Josh Santana
- Composer: Greg Caro
- Country of origin: Philippines
- Original language: Filipino
- No. of episodes: 340

Production
- Executive producers: Carlo Katigbak; Cory Vidanes; Laurenti Dyogi; Malou Santos
- Producers: Olivia M. Lamasan; Cathy Ochoa-Perez; Maru R. Benitez; Julie Anne R. Benitez
- Running time: 30 minutes
- Production company: Star Creatives

Original release
- Network: ABS-CBN
- Release: May 26, 2003 – September 10, 2004

Basta't Kasama Kita (International title: As Long As I'm With You / transl. just as you are with me) is a Philippine television drama series broadcast by ABS-CBN. Directed by Jerry Lopez Sinenang and Trina N. Dayrit, it stars Robin Padilla and Judy Ann Santos. It aired on the network's Primetime Bida line up and worldwide on TFC from May 26, 2003 to September 10, 2004, replacing Bituin and was replaced by Victim Undercover.

This series is streaming online on Jeepney TV YouTube channel.

== Premise ==
Princess Gonzales (Judy Ann Santos) is a young law graduate who signs up with the National Bureau of Investigation as a rookie agent. Her dedication to her work is fueled by a desire to find out what happened to her father, who disappeared several years before and presumed dead. Her performance later earns her an assignment with the NBI's EAGLES (Elite Agents of Government Against Lawless Elements of Society) squad, where she is paired up with veteran agent Ambet Katindig (Robin Padilla) as they handle tough missions. Although Princess and Ambet's work ethics clash over the course of the series, their bond develops into a relationship by the end.

== Cast and characters ==
=== Lead cast ===
- Robin Padilla as Alberto "Ambet" Katindig
- Judy Ann Santos as Princess Gonzales / Esperanza Gonzales

=== Also as main cast ===
- Gina Pareño as Nanay Ligaya
- Lito Pimentel as Chief Adan K. Abordo
- John Arcilla as Godofredo "Prince" Gonzales
- Sylvia Sanchez as Strawberry Gonzales / Celia Gonzales
- Tetchie Agbayani as Marina Gonzales-Lagdameo
- John Apacible as Abdon Lagdameo
- Rommel Padilla as Atty. Phillip "Buhawi" Felipe Agda
- Diego Castro III as Borgy Ramirez
- Charlie Davao as Federico Gonzales
- Marc Acueza as Jovan Gonzales-Lagdameo
- Marianne dela Riva as Soledad / Asuncion Tabinas
- Mylene Dizon as Joyce Villaflor
- TJ Trinidad as John Paul Lacsamana
- Edgar Mortiz as Kiko
- Hazel Ann Mendoza as Pretty
- Robert Arevalo as Don Ignacio De Asis
- Dominic Ochoa as George
- Angelica Jones as Constancia "Shai" Meguiare
- Hyubs Azarcon as Pacholo "Bok" Matanglawin
- Jiro Manio as Hapon
- Hannah Camille Bustillos as Vilma
- Jeffrey Santos as Aldrin De Asis

=== Extended cast ===
- Angeli Gonzales as young Princess Gonzales / Esperanza Gonzales
- Giorgia Ortega as Lady Godiva
- Ced Carreon as Milos
- Camille Prats as Diamante/Susan
- Asia Agcaoili as Rhowena Aroanah/Macaraeg
- Michelle Bayle as Mariel Walican Buenaflor
- Anton Bernardo as Danny Balboa
- Maricar de Mesa as Lyra Manuel
- Jojit Lorenzo as Paolo Macapanas
- Lui Manansala as Ellen Rosales
- Eliza Pineda as Jing
- Simon Ibarra as Gilbert Escoto
- Gerard Pizzaras as Alan Balano
- Mon Confiado as Renante "Neil" Valerio
- Emil Sandoval as Rodito Abellar
- Crispin Pineda as Waldo
- Jhoana Marie Tan as Gigette
- Mike Magat as Marco Garcia
- Rodel Velayo as Edwin Buenaflor
- Evangeline Pascual as Mrs. Rebecca Winters
- Paolo O'Hara as Keith Winters
- Nikki Valdez as Alex
- Pauleen Luna as Karina
- Neil Ryan Sese as Buloy
- June Hidalgo as Kidlat
- July Hidalgo as Francis Hidalgo
- Mike Lloren as Boyong
- Mosang as Maya
- Marnie Lapuz as Maru Bravo
- Francis Enriquez as Glenn Maglanglang
- Maritess Joaquin as Senator Lea Abesamis
- Zaldy "Mar" Castillo
- Mark Dionisio as Rey "Acid thrower"
- Toffee Calma as Wang
- Bing Davao as Gatmaitan
- Gigette Reyes as Pia Saavedra
- Cris Daluz as Tatay Emong
- Jen Rosendahl as LaToya
- Rodolfo Solis Jr. as Rigor
- Gem Ramos as Alan's wife
- Berting Labra as Lolo Inggo
- Pia Moran as Ms.Vida
- Lance Castillo as Abel Lucero
- Menggie Cobarrubias as Abelardo Lucero Sr.
- Manolito Ong
- Renato Rodriguez
- Mark Matibag
- Ronald Bingwaoel
- Francis Noblefranca
- Jethro Carandang
- Ferdinand dela Cruz
- Carlene Aguilar as Cynthia Sanchez Perez
- Ama Quiambao as Betty
- Jhong Hilario as Ariel
- Michael Roy Jornales
- Levi Ignacio
- Cherry Lou as Candy
- Michael Conan as Peanuts
- Caridad Sanchez as Lola Rosing
- Chandro Concepcion as Hermie
- Angel de Leon
- Pen Medina as Senior Agent Mariano Capistrano/Apo Bathala
- Ynez Veneracion as Sanyata
- Gino Paul Guzman as Kabuhay
- Lisa Ranillo as Yasmine Quiambao
- Dido dela Paz as Atty. Quiambao
- Kookoo Gonzales as Mrs. Robinson
- Joseph Bitangcol as Andoy
- John Blair Arellano as Tibo
- Eunice Lagusad as Merlie
- Eva Darren as Luzviminda Rosario
- JV Villar as Himself
- Suzette Ranillo as Luisa Rivera
- Anita Linda as Mrs. Rosalinda Rivera/Apoy Saling
- Lorenzo Mara as Pusong
- Nonong de Andres as Oscar
- Len Ag Santos as Mrs.Sung
- Ermie Concepcion as Yaya Luring
- Eva Ramos
- Lucy Quinto
- Wilson Go
- Telly Babasa as Mr.Quintos
- Kakai Bautista as Aireen
- Aj Dee as Giovan's friend
- Bebong Osorio as Ho Shen
- Angelo Caangay as Nelson
- Irene Celebre
- Mandy Ochoa as Pepito Laude
- Lorna Lopez as Madam Hilda
- Tessie Villarama as Mrs.Perez
- Archie Ventosa as Mr.Perez
- Cloyd Robinson as Madame Kim
- Pocholo Montes as Ebora Ravales
- Nante Montereal as Mang Serafin
- Kenji Marquez as Ringo Samalde
- Charlon Davao as Cedrick
- Soliman Cruz as Attorney
- Rey Sagum as Kardong Kalawit
- Val Iglesias
- Ching Arellano
- Jaycee Parker

== Reception ==
The finale posted a 52.5% in the Mega Manila TV Ratings according to AGB Philippines. The show became known for doing the first ever live finale (in 2004) for any drama series on Philippine television behind the rival soap opera of GMA Network's Te Amo, Maging Sino Ka Man, which also ended the following week.
