= Ate Glow =

Filipino comedian

- Ate Glow performing as an impersonator
- Born: March 10, 1981 (age 45); Quezon City, Philippines
- Other name: Renee Hampshire
- Occupations: Actress, comedian, impersonator
- Years active: 2001–2017
- Notable work: Impersonation of former President Gloria Macapagal Arroyo under the stage name, "Ate Glow".

Renee Hampshire (born March 10, 1981) better known by her stage name Ate Glow is a Filipino comedian and actress who is known for her impersonation of former President Gloria Macapagal Arroyo.

== Early life ==
Glow was born on March 10, 1981. She was the third among the four children of the Facunla family. Presenting as gay (bakla) earlier in her life, Glow says that there was never any problem for her parents, including her police officer father, regarding her gender expression. She began to learn about sexual orientation and her gender expression when she was three or four years old realizing that she is not a straight male. She was said by her father to be feminine but Glow has stated that she wasn't the "typical gay" during her childhood who likes to play Barbie dolls and prefers tumbang preso and luksong baka which she describes as games for boys.

Glow was an honor student and joined extra-curricular activities during her elementary and high school years. She described herself as a flamboyant and talkative person who was involved in extracurricular school activities which involves teaching dance, singing and play-acting. She attended the University of the Philippines where she graduated from college.

== Career ==
Hampshire is best known for her act as Ate Glow, a comedic impersonation of former President Gloria Macapagal Arroyo. She is also known for the catchphrase "Ang saya-saya, no" (transl. Isn't it so fun) which she usually use as part of her impersonation act. Still presenting as a gay man at that time, Hampshire considered being an actor outside the Ate Glow persona, but she did not want "to be stereotyped as just a funny person" since gay actors in the Philippines are usually typecast as the comic relief or the sassy sidekick.

Hampshire first act as Ate Glow was at a student variety show at the University of the Philippines in 2001, around the time the move to impeach President Joseph Estrada is in progress. Arroyo was still Vice President at that time who later became president after the Second EDSA Revolution.

Hampshire's first television appearance was at Wazzup Wazzup as a street segment host. Her first film stint was in the 2003 film My First Romance where she appeared as the character "Yaya Glow".

During the 2004 presidential elections, she performed as Ate Glow in between rallies and speeches although she did not formally supported President Arroyo's election bid.

In 2005, Arroyo herself picked her as the ambassador of her administration's anti-illegal drugs campaign. Arroyo reportedly liked Glow's impersonation of her since the latter was described by the former as a smart person. Despite this, Hampshire's own political beliefs came into conflict with her act as Ate Glow since she was impersonating a controversial politician. In university events, she often critique President Arroyo but in national media she had to tone down her act.

Ate Glow with Barack Obama lookalike Ilham Anas featured in a 2008 television commercial by TBWA Santiago, Mangada and Puno for Motilium which has won major industry awards.

Glow's fame gradually declined with the end of Arroyo's term as president in 2010 with her last movie appearance being in the 2012 film Moron 5 and the Crying Lady. She featured in an episode of GMA's documentary show Tunay na Buhay in 2014 where she shared her biography.

== Personal life ==
Ate Glow is a straight transgender woman. Initially thought herself as being a gay man, Ate Glow was able to make sense of her gender identity while she was in the United Kingdom.

She had two serious relationships before her marriage; one with a Filipino and another with an Irish Caucasian man in Dublin. In 2013, Glow met a British man who she would later marry while visiting a friend in London. On July 2, 2016 she married a British man at the Chelsea Registry Office. Her husband was aware of her gender identity when they got married. Since her marriage, Glow reportedly goes by the name Renee Hampshire.

== Filmography ==
=== Film ===
Year	Title	Role	Notes
2003	My First Romance	Yaya Glow	Film debut; Anthology: "One Love"
2004	Gagamboy	Ate Gloring	
2012	Moron 5 and the Crying Lady	Inmate in a wheelchair (Gloria Macapagal Arroyo)	

=== Television ===
Year	Title	Role	Notes
2003	Maalaala Mo Kaya: Aparador	Herself	Episode guest
2004	Wazzup Wazzup	Herself	Segment host
2005	Debate with Mare at Pare	Herself	Guest
2010	Diz Iz It!	Herself	Judge
2011	Laugh Out Loud	Herself	Guest
2011	I Dare You	Herself	Judge
2014	Tunay na Buhay	Herself	Guest
2015	Kapuso Mo, Jessica Soho	Herself	Guest
