= Smaller and Smaller Circles =

2002 novel by F. H. Batacan

- Cover photo of the Random House edition of the book
- Author: F. H. Batacan
- Cover artist: Unknown
- Language: English
- Genre: Crime novel
- Publisher: University of the Philippines Press; Soho Press
- Publication date: 2002
- Publication place: Philippines
- Media type: Print (hardback & paperback)
- Pages: 155 pp (first edition)

Smaller and Smaller Circles is a mystery novel by Filipino novelist F. H. Batacan. It won the Carlos Palanca Grand Prize for the English Novel in 1999. It also won the National Book Award in 2002 and the Madrigal-Gonzalez Award in 2003.

The book was the first Filipino crime novel. This novel was published in 2002 by the University of the Philippines Press as one of the first new fiction works they had selected. Although most Filipino English-language fiction works garner a single print run of only 1,000 copies, Smaller and Smaller Circles was reprinted four times, with a total of 6,000 copies.

A film adaptation of the novel, Smaller and Smaller Circles, directed by Raya Martin, was released on 6 December 2017.

== Plot summary ==
Its main protagonists are Gus Saenz and Jerome Lucero, Jesuit priests who also perform forensic work. The mystery revolves around the murders of young boys in a poor region of Payatas, Philippines. While dealing with the systematic corruption of the government, church and the elite, the two priests delve into criminal profiling, crime scene investigation and forensic analysis to solve the killings, and eventually, find the murderer.

== Themes ==
In an unusual twist on the crime fiction stereotype, readers know the identity of the criminal.

A recurring theme in the novel is the inefficiency of the National Bureau of Investigation. Gus and Jerome, together with their ally reporter Joanna Bonifacio, take matters into their own hands and solve the mystery of the serial killings in Payatas.

An additional theme of the novel is the invisibility of the poor.

== Sequel ==
A semi-sequel to the novel was released in 2013 as a short story in the Manila Noir anthology edited by Jessica Hagedorn. It was entitled Comforter of the Afflicted and focused on a case handled solely by Gus Saenz with almost none of the other original characters from the book making a return.

== Sources ==
- Hidalgo, Cristina Pantoja (2006), Over a Cup of Ginger Tea: Conversations on the Literary Narratives of Filipino Women, University of the Philippines Press, ISBN 978-971-542-524-7
