= Jill Yulo =

Filipina actress

- Born: December 28, 1989 (age 36); Surigao City. Surigao del Norte
- Occupation: Actress
- Years active: 2004–2012
- Height: 1.62 m (5 ft 4 in)

Jill Yulo (born December 28, 1989) is a Filipina actress who is a member of Star Magic, ABS-CBN Corporation's talent management and development center. She starred in Star Cinema's D'Anothers and was a finalist, with Alwyn Uytingco, on Qpids. She also starred in the ABS-CBN soap opera Maria Flordeluna with Alwyn Uytingco.

== Career ==
In 2005, Yulo was partnered with Alwyn Uytingco on the reality show Qpids. They went on to become one of the final teams on the show.

== Filmography ==
=== Television ===
- Sarah The Teen Princess (2004) as Alice
- Qpids (2005) herself
- ASAP (2004–07) Herself / Performer
- Komiks
  - Episode: "Bunsong Kerubin" (2006)
- Star Magic Presents
  - Episode: "Sabihin Mo Lang" (2006) as Belle
  - Episode: "Love Chop" (2006)
- Maalaala Mo Kaya
  - Episode: "Balabal" (2006) as Baby
  - Episode: "Salamin" (2006) as Carlotta
  - Episode: "Palaisdaan" (2006) as Rose
- Your Song: Ang Soundtrack ng LoveLife mo! (2006)
  - Episode: "Panalangin" (2006)
- Maalaala Mo Kaya
  - Episode: "Cellphone" (2007) as Sheryl Gavito (Lead)
- Star Magic Presents: Abt Ur Luv (2007)
- Maria Flordeluna (2007) as Annie Natividad
- Pedro Penduko at ang mga Engkantao (2007)
  - Episode: "Saranggay" (2007) as Jane
- Maalaala Mo Kaya
  - Episode: "Dalandan" (2008) as Young Cathy
- Reputasyon (2011–12) as Nina

=== Films ===
- Spirit of the Glass (2004)
- D'Anothers (2005)
- Happy Hearts (2007) as Margot
- Tiyanaks (2007) as Hanz
- A Secret Affair (2012) as Katie
