= UST Angelicum College =

Roman Catholic college in Quezon City, Philippines

- Unibersidad ng Santo Tomas - Kolehiyo ng Angelicum
- Former names: Angelicum School (1972–1996); Angelicum College (1996–2018)
- Motto: Caritas, Justitia, Fortitudo (Latin)
- Motto in English: Charity, Justice, Fortitude
- Type: Private Non-Graded Non-profit Basic and Higher education institution
- Established: July 5, 1972 (54 years and 41 days)
- Religious affiliation: Roman Catholic (Dominican)
- Academic affiliations: PAASCU
- Rector: Fr. John Stephen Besa, O.P.
- Director: Eunice Mareth Areola (Academic Affairs); Noel Kristoffer Castor (Financial Affairs); Roger Quirao (Religious Affairs)
- Students: over 7,000
- Location: 12 M.J. Cuenco St., Sta. Mesa Heights, Quezon City, Metro Manila, Philippines; 14°37′39.54″N 121°0′34.79″E
- Campus: Urban
- Official Hymn: UST Angelicum College Hymn
- Colors: Blue, white, yellow
- Nickname: UST-Angelicum Tigercubs / Roebucks
- Sporting affiliations: WNCAA, Athletic Association for Private Schools (AAPS)
- Website: www.ustangelicum.edu.ph
- Location in Metro Manila Location in Luzon Location in the Philippines

The UST Angelicum College, officially the University of Santo Tomas - Angelicum College is a private Catholic basic and higher education institution run by the Philippine Dominican Province of the Order of Preachers located in Quezon City, Metro Manila, Philippines. It was founded on July 5, 1972 by the Dominican priest Rev. Fr. Rogelio B. Alarcon, OP who became its first rector. UST Angelicum is an official member of the Dominican Network. It attained Level III Primary Accreditation conducted by PAASCU

== Integration with University of Santo Tomas ==
Logo prior integrating with UST

In academic year 2018-19, Angelicum College was renamed University of Santo Tomas – Angelicum College as per a memorandum of agreement signed on June 29, 2017. The renaming was part of plans to oversee and integrate with other Dominican educational institutions in the Philippines.

The existing Board of Trustees of Angelicum was dissolved and a new one was formed composed of 12 members, 9 from UST Manila and 3 from Angelicum College but retained its independence in handling its own administrative and financial affairs. UST Rector Fr. Herminio Dagohoy, O.P. became Chief Executive Officer and College Rector while former Angelicum College Rector Fr. Ferdinand Bautista, O.P. became Chief Operating Officer. As part of the integration process, Rev. Fr. Herminio Dagohoy, O.P. planned to implement new policies and programs to improve Angelicum College's approach to education.

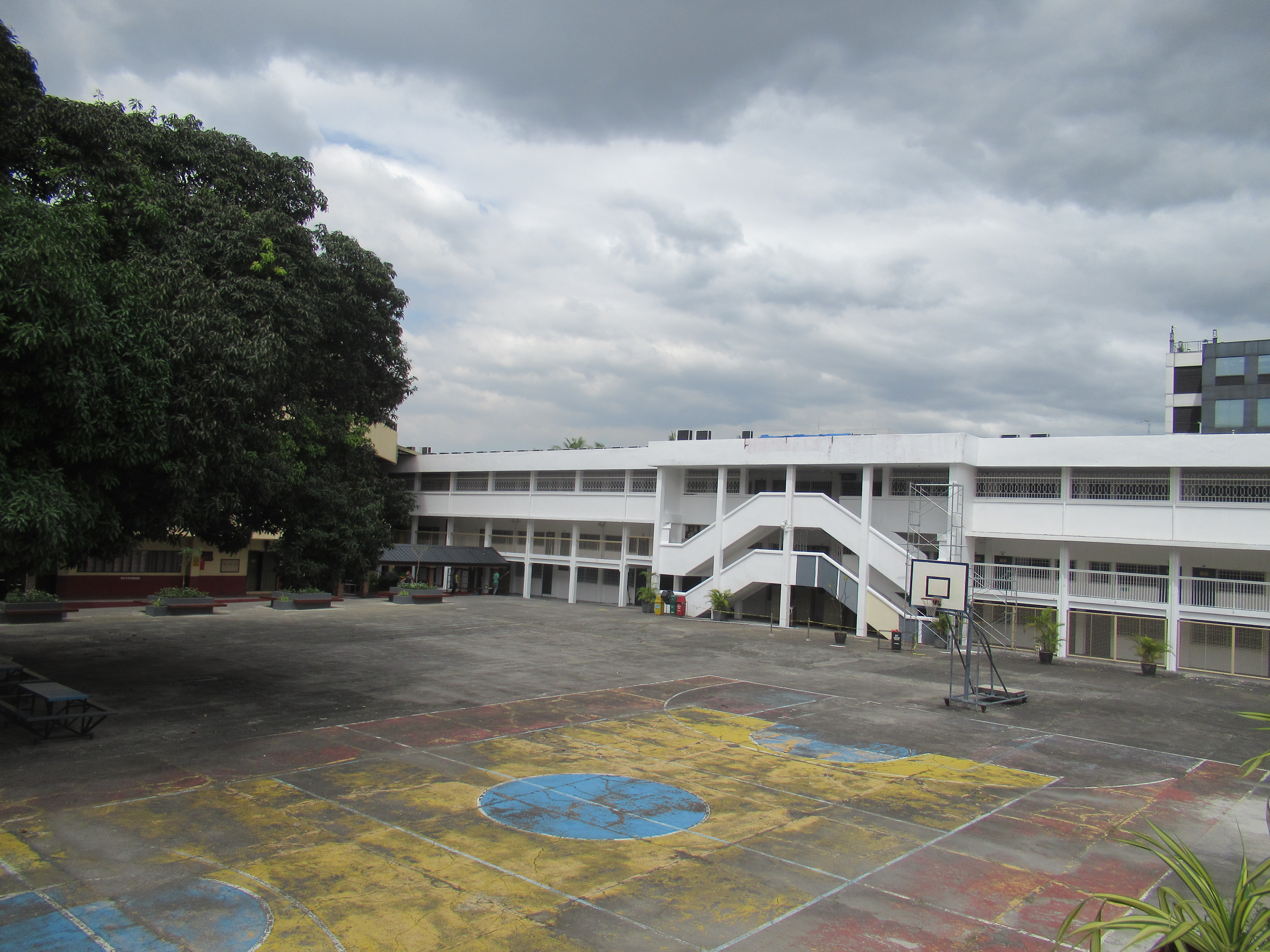
Facade in February 2023

== Notable alumni ==
- Sarah Christophers, actress
- Dianne dela Fuente, actress and singer
- Sarah Geronimo, singer, actress, television personality, and record producer
- Nicole Kim Donesa, actress, singer, and beauty queen
- Yasmien Kurdi, singer-songwriter, actor, and commercial model
- Derrick Monasterio, actor and singer
- Kurt Perez, child actor
- Julie Anne San Jose, singer, songwriter, actress, and television personality
- Empress Schuck, actress
- Bernadette Sembrano, reporter, newscaster, and television host
- Antonio Trillanes, politician
- Lauren Young, actress and model
- Bianca Bustamante, racing driver
- Samuel Verzosa, Jr., entrepreneur and politician

== See also ==
- University of Santo Tomas
- University of Santo Tomas - Legazpi
