= Sarah Christophers =

Australian-born Filipino actress

- Born: Sarah Jane Christophers; 28 August 1986 (age 40); Australia
- Education: Angelicum College; University of Santo Tomas
- Occupation: Actress
- Years active: 1999–2005
- Agent: Star Magic (1999–2005)

Sarah Christophers (born 28 August 1986) is an Australian-born Filipino actress.

== Biography ==
Christophers was launched by ABS-CBN via Star Magic Batch 8. She first got her acting role in the family drama Ang Munting Paraiso.

In 2001, she made a crossover appearance to the ABS-CBN teen drama G-mik. In the show she went to watch her school's basketball match against the school of Yuan Salcedo, played by John Prats.

In 2002, she played as Pamela Sue in the teen drama Berks after Ang Munting Paraiso ended her three-year run.

She was cast as a reporter in the comedy news program Wazzup Wazzup. The same year, she made a guest appearance in the stunt/dare reality game show Victim Overload. During her episode appearance she announced that she is leaving for Australia to continue her high school studies.

In 2008, she was featured on the cover of the April issue of Uno Magazine.

== Personal background ==
In high school, she was home schooled under Angelicum College Home Study Program. In college, she took up Business Administration in the University of Santo Tomas. She took further studies in Perth, Australia.

== Filmography ==
Television
Year	Title	Role	Notes
1999–2002	Ang Munting Paraiso	Carolina "Carol" Dionisio	
2001	G-mik	Carolina "Carol" Dionisio	Guest, Crossover episode with Ang Munting Paraiso
2002	Berks	Pamela Sue	
2004	Wazzup Wazzup	Herself	tadjock, "Sports Babe" segment
2004	Victim Overload	Herself	contestant
2004	Persona	Host	Personal One on One Interview with Heart E.

Film
Year	Title	Role	Notes
2000	Daddy O, Baby O!	Helen	
2002	Jologs	Party guest	
