= Qpids =

Television series

- Genre: Reality show
- Created by: Laurenti M. Dyogi
- Directed by: Jon Ilagan
- Presented by: Anne Curtis; Luis Manzano
- Opening theme: "Dito Sa Puso Ko" by Josh Santana and Nikki Gil
- Composer: Ogie Alcasid
- Country of origin: Philippines
- Original language: Filipino
- No. of episodes: 35 weekday episodes, 12 weekend episodes, 3 specials

Production
- Running time: Varies, see Show formats

Original release
- Network: ABS-CBN
- Release: May 23 – September 25, 2005

Qpids is a 2005 Philippine television reality show broadcast by ABS-CBN. Hosted by Anne Curtis and Luis Manzano, it aired from May 23 to September 25, 2005, replacing Hiram. The show featured nine loveteams who competed through races and acting challenges. At the end of each challenge, the weakest loveteam was eliminated, until the final four loveteams remained. The winner of the "Ultimate Loveteam" title was determined through a combination of viewer votes and judges' scores.

This series is currently streaming on Jeepney TV's YouTube Channel every 11:00 am.

== Production ==
=== Origin and concept ===
After the success in 2004 of reality talent search program Star Circle Quest where he had been a juror, Qpids creator Laurenti Dyogi conceptualized a similar reality talent search program, this time with the intent to find the best acting loveteam.

Star Circle Quest, which by then was popularly known by its acronym SCQ, became the inspiration for SCQpids, the name being a play on "SCQ" and the word "cupid". The first two letters were eventually dropped and the show later came to be known simply as Qpids.

In the first three weeks of the series, 9 'princesses' and 18 'princes' were introduced, then sent on a variety of adventures to get to know one another. Each princess was then asked to pick her prince, while the show's creator, Laurenti Dyogi, played the role of Mr. Qpido by picking a prince for each princess.

The resulting pairings created interlocking love triangles, where each princess was paired with two princes, and where some of the princes were also linked to two princesses.

By the end of the third week, Mr. Qpido announced his final choice for each princess. The princes who were not chosen were eliminated from the show, leaving only 9 love pairs.

The next 10 weeks of the show saw the 9 love pairs competing in acting challenges. A panel of judges, dubbed The Love Council, was assembled after each challenge to judge their performances. Through a combination of judges' scores and viewer votes through SMS text messages and phone calls, the weakest pair was identified and eliminated, until only four pairs remained. These four pairs were considered Qpids Finalists.

The four Qpids Finalists then performed together in a four-week drama mini-series. As in previous weeks, the Ultimate Loveteam was determined through a combination of judges' scores and viewer votes.

Two awards were given on the Grand Finals night—a Voters' Choice Award (for the pair with the most viewer votes) and the Qpids Ultimate Loveteam title.

=== Writing ===
Writing was led by Headwriter Theodore Boborol, with writing team members Adolfo Alix, Jr., Mariami Tanangco and Marcus Vinuya.

Since the show was a reality-program, the writing team was initially focused more on writing dialogue for the hosts, and conceptualizing the challenges that the cast would face. Later in the series, however, short acting skits and full-length drama challenges were written for the Qpids Finalists.

=== Casting ===
Casting was done through auditions, and screen tests were performed individually and in pairs. Selected audition and screen test video clips were later aired in a spin-off program called Qpids Sunday Loventures.

Unlike earlier reality talent searches, which auditioned unknown individuals, all nine 'princesses' selected were already talents of Star Magic, the talent management agency of the ABS-CBN Corporation. The 'princes' were also primarily from Star Magic, although a handful were either independent artists or artists managed by other talent agencies.

=== Broadcasting ===
Qpids was originally scheduled to begin airing on May 2, 2005 but initial broadcast was moved to May 9 and later moved again to May 23. It was later explained that three days worth of edited material had been lost or accidentally deleted, resulting in a need to push back the show's start date.

=== Music ===
The show's theme song was performed by Nikki Gil and Josh Santana and is entitled Dito Sa Puso Ko (roughly translates to "Here in my heart"). The accompanying music video, created under the direction of Qpids director [on Ilagan, featured members of cast dancing with the singers.

=== Opening sequence ===
Three opening sequences were used during the course of the show. The first opening sequence featured the chorus of the theme song and overlaid still photos of all 9 princesses over scenes from the music video as their names appeared on screen.

The second opening sequence featured only the final five loveteams after 9 princes and 4 other loveteam pairs had already been eliminated.

The third opening sequence featured only the final four loveteams after the 5th loveteam pair had been eliminated. It was essentially the same video as the second version, but with all scenes with the 5th eliminated pair removed.

=== Settings ===
Qpids was shot primarily in the Philippines, with a handful of episodes filmed in Hong Kong as part of a "loventure".

The early weeks of the show, which featured beach and safari scenes, were filmed in Subic Bay in the province of Zambales. The Union of Hearts episodes were filmed at Fernwood Gardens in Quezon City.

Heartbreak (elimination) episodes were filmed in front of a live studio audience in Studio 1 of the ABS-CBN network's compound in Quezon City.

The music video was filmed at Intramuros.

== Show formats and timeslots ==
In its first seven weeks, Qpids aired on weeknights (Monday to Friday), with each episode lasting 30 to 45 minutes (including commercials). A total of 35 episodes were aired in this format.

On the Sundays of Weeks 5 to 7, three special episodes called Qpids Sunday Loventures aired. These special episodes showed behind-the-scenes footage, bloopers, and never-before-seen segments that did not make it into the regular episodes.

Beginning its 8th week, Qpids stopped airing on weeknights and moved to a weekly schedule. A total of 12 weekend episodes were aired in the timeslot that had been occupied by Qpids Sunday Loventures, prompting the writers to change the name of the elimination shows from Heartbreak Night to Heartbreak Sunday.

== Cast ==
=== Hosts ===
- Anne Curtis
- Luis Manzano

=== Love Prince ===
Listed alphabetically by last name:

- Marc Acueza
- Michael Agassi
- Carlo Aquino
- Mhyco Aquino
- Marc Butler
- Mikel Campos
- Bernard Cardona
- Gian Carlos
- Aaron Concepcion
- Marc Cortez
- Janus Del Prado
- Gabb Drilon
- TJ Ramos
- Dominic Roco
- Felix Roco
- John Wayne Sace
- Timmy Boy Sta. Maria
- Alwyn Uytingco

=== Love Princesses ===
Listed alphabetically by last name:

- Isabel Blaesi
- Amparo "Paw" Diaz
- Vanessa Lorraine Gomez
- Carla Humphries-Loren
- Pauleen Luna
- Karel Marquez
- Hazel Ann Mendoza
- Andrea Torres
- Jill Yulo

== Elimination notes ==
=== Creating the nine pairs ===
The first round of eliminations took place at the start of Week 2, and reduced the number of princes from 18 to 14. The first set of princes were eliminated because they had not been chosen either by a princess or by Mr. Qpido. Eliminated were: Aaron Concepcion, Cholo Barretto, Mike Agassi, and Timmy Boy Sta. Maria.

The second round of eliminations took place at the end of Week 3, when five more prince charmings walked down Heartbreak Road. They were eliminated from the show because they were not picked by Mr. Qpido when he created the final 9 pairs in the segment called The Union of Hearts. Eliminated were: John Wayne Sace, Marc Acueza, Marc Butler, Marc Cortez, and TJ Ramos.

=== Heartbreak eliminations ===
After The Union of Hearts, all subsequent eliminations were made by pairs in a live show called Heartbreak Night or Heartbreak Sunday.

In the first Heartbreak Night, the weakest pair was determined based solely on viewer votes through text and phone calls. All subsequent eliminations were determined by a combined score: 50% - Love Council score, and 50% - viewer votes.

1st Pair Eliminated: LexBel
Who: Isabel Blaesi and Felix Roco
When: At end of Week 5

2nd Pair Eliminated: GabRel
Who: Karel Marquez and Gabb Drilon
When: At start of Week 7
Love Council: Joyce Bernal, William Martinez, and Lauren Dyogi.

3rd Pair Eliminated: PauGi
Who: Pauleen Luna and Gian Castro Carlos
When: Week 8
Love Council: Manilyn Reynes, Wowie de Guzman, and Lauren Dyogi.

4th Pair Eliminated: DomRea
Who: Andrea Torres and Dominic Roco
When: Week 11
Love Council: Gina Alajar, Lotlot de Leon, and Lauren Dyogi.

5th Pair Eliminated: CarVane
Who: Vanessa Gomez and Carlo Aquino
When: Week 13
Love Council: Jose Javier Reyes, Joey Lopez Sineneng, and Lauren Dyogi.

== Qpids Grand Finals ==
With only four pairs remaining, eliminations were suspended for four weeks to give way to a four-week drama mini-series (the Qpids Dramaserye) designed to showcase the acting skills of the Qpids Finalists.

The four Qpids Finalist pairs (listed alphabetically) were:

- JaRla: Carla Humphries and Janus del Prado
- JilWyn: Jill Yulo and Alwyn Uytingco
- MhyZel: Hazel Ann Mendoza and Mhyco Aquino
- PawEl: Paw Diaz and Mikel Campos

The Love Council members for the Grand Finals were Olive Lamasan, Joey Reyes, and Lauren Dyogi.

The Qpids Ultimate Loveteam title was awarded to PawEl for having the highest score based on Love Council scores and viewer votes.

The Qpids Voters' Choice title was awarded to JaRla for garnering 41% of viewer votes.

== Spin-offs ==
Qpids spawned a number of short-lived spin-offs which featured the cast of the original show. The spin-offs were part of the show's promotional and advertising efforts.

=== Qpids Sunday Loventures ===
The most short-lived Qpids spin-off, Qpids Sunday Loventures only had three episodes, which aired on Sunday afternoons during Week 5 to Week 7 of the original show.

The original intent was to have different Qpids cast members act as hosts for the show to provide commentary and introduce behind-the-scenes footage, bloopers, and never-before-seen segments that had not been aired as part of the show's regular episodes. The hosts for the first episode were Paw Diaz, Mikel Campos, Carla Humphries, and Janus del Prado.

Schedule conflicts and cost concerns forced the show to change its format, and the two remaining episodes were instead hosted by Luis Manzano and Anne Curtis.

The three Qpids Sunday Loventure episodes aired on June 19, June 26, and July 3, 2005.

=== Qpids Qties on Fanatic Allstars ===
Qpids cast members also appeared in a weekly segment of the variety show Fanatic Allstars on Sunday afternoons in ABS-CBN. The segment was a dance contest featuring three different groups of artists. The Qpids cast members were fielded as a team called the Qpids Qties.

Qpids cast members who took part in Qpids Qties included: Hazel Ann Mendoza, Vanessa Gomez, Mhyco Aquino, Jill Yulo, Alwyn Uytingco, Carla Humphies, Janus del Prado, Andrea Torres, Pauleen Luna, Gian Carlos Castro, and Gabb Drilon.

Paw Diaz took part in the dance contest as a member of a rival team featuring artists discovered through Star Circle Quest. Other Qpids cast members, such as twins Dominic and Felix Roco were also fielded as members of another rival team featuring Star Circle Batch 13 talents.

- June 12, 2005 - Cowboys and Indians theme
- June 19, 2005 - Cheerdancing theme
- June 26, 2005 - Western Themed dance number
- July 3, 2005 - Qties go Futuristic
- July 10, 2005 - Qties go Retro
- July 17, 2005 - Masquerade theme
- July 24, 2005 - Jungle theme
- August 7, 2005 - Qties in at the Allstars

=== Qpids mall shows ===
Mall shows were also held in the weeks leading up to the pilot episode of Qpids. The shows featured cast members and were open to the general public at no charge. Qpids merchandise, including pins, stuffed animals, and T-shirts, were also available for sale at the mallshows.

The following mallshows were held:

- April 24, 2005 - Ever Ortigas Mall
- May 8, 2005 - Ever Gotesco Commonwealth
- May 29, 2005 - Market Market Activity Center
- June 12, 2005 - Sta. Lucia Mall

== See also ==
- Star Magic
- List of programs broadcast by ABS-CBN
