= Ang Supremo =

1988 film starring Ramon Revilla

- Directed by: Joey del Rosario
- Written by: Alex M. Suñga
- Produced by: GP; Eddie Garcia
- Starring: Ramon Revilla
- Cinematography: Danny Bustos
- Edited by: Segundo Ramos
- Music by: Vehnee Saturno
- Production companies: GP Films; EG Productions
- Release date: July 21, 1988
- Country: Philippines
- Language: Filipino

Ang Supremo (lit. 'The Supremo') is a 1988 Filipino action film directed by Joey del Rosario and starring Ramon Revilla as the titular supremo. It also stars Chat Silayan, Eddie Garcia, Jean Saburit, Rommel Valdez, and Miguel Rodriguez.

Produced by GP Films, the film was released on July 21, 1988. Critic Lav Diaz gave Ang Supremo a mixed review, criticizing the film's confusing setting as to whether or not it is about the historical Hukbalahap guerrilla group or the contemporary New People's Army, though he still considered it an adequate action film. Eddie Infante won the Film Academy of the Philippines Award for Best Supporting Actor.

== Cast ==
- Ramon Revilla as Luis Talusan
- Chat Silayan
- Eddie Garcia
- Jean Saburit
- Rommel Valdez
- Miguel Rodriguez
- Ulysses Santiago
- Greg Moreno
- Dennis Isla
- Rocco Montalban
- Rodolfo Boy Garcia
- Gary Gallardo
- Jose Romulo
- Arsenio Boots Bautista
- Karim Kiram
- Ernie Ortega
- Omar Camar
- Lucita Soriano
- Johnny Wilson
- Ramon d'Salva
- Eddie Arenas
- Romeo Rivera
- Ruben Rustia
- Eddie Infante
- Johnny Vicar
- Renato Robles
- Vic Varrion
- Robert Talby
- Naty Santiago
- Ester Chavez
- Estrella Kuenzler
- Linda Castro
- Alex Suñga
- Francisco Cruz
- E.R. Ejercito
- Delia Razon

The poster for Ang Supremo notes that the film has "a cast of [t]housands".

== Release ==
Ang Supremo was released on July 21, 1988, with free diver's watches and T-shirts handed out to early moviegoers in Metro Manila.

=== Critical response ===
Lav Diaz, writing for the Manila Standard, criticized the unclear setting of Ang Supremo's story as to whether or not it is about the defunct Hukbalahap, a socialist guerilla group formed during World War II, or the contemporary New People's Army, the armed wing of the Communist Party of the Philippines. Diaz also pointed out that the film never used the word "Huk" or any other term referring to the Hukbalahap, adding to the confusion. However, he stated that Ang Supremo is still a fine action film, commending its contextualization of rebellions as chiefly caused by people's suffering in rural areas.

== Accolades ==
Group	Category	Name	Result
1989 FAP Awards	Best Supporting Actor	Eddie Infante	Won
