= Gagamboy =

2004 Filipino superhero comedy film by Erik Matti

- Film poster
- Directed by: Erik Matti
- Screenplay by: Dwight Gaston
- Story by: Roselle Monteverde-Teo; Erik Matti; Dwight Gaston
- Produced by: Roselle Monteverde-Teo; Ronald Monteverde
- Starring: Vhong Navarro; Jay Manalo; Aubrey Miles
- Cinematography: J. A. Tadena
- Edited by: Vito Cajili
- Music by: Jobin Ballesteros
- Production company: MAQ Productions
- Distributed by: Regal Entertainment
- Release date: January 1, 2004
- Running time: 105 minutes
- Country: Philippines
- Language: Filipino
- Box office: ₱17.6 million

Gagamboy is a 2004 Philippine superhero comedy film directed by Erik Matti and written by Dwight Gaston from an original story concept he co-developed with Matti and Roselle Monteverde-Teo. The film stars John Hermie Garcia Galo as the titular character, alongside Jay Manalo, Aubrey Miles, Long Mejia, Bearwin Meily, and Rene "Ate Glow" Facunla. Similar to the Spider-Man films, with a mutated spider that causes Junie to gain his superpowers and become the titular superhero.

Produced by MAQ Productions and distributed by Regal Entertainment, the film was theatrically released on January 1, 2004, as an entry to the 29th Metro Manila Film Festival.

== Plot ==
Junie (Navarro) is an ice cream vendor who sells ice cream to children and adults alike. After his shift, he is in a predicament with a rival vendor, Dodoy (Jay Manalo). Their manager, angered by their actions, demotes Junie to a warehouse guard. Dodoy celebrates, only to be demoted too, working a different shift from Junie. Junie goes home in a bad mood until he sees the love of his life, Liana (Aubrey Miles). After dinner, Junie is ready to sleep, to start a new job the next day. While working, Junie accidentally swallows a spider that has been exposed to a chemical spill, thus giving him web-slinging abilities, and becoming "Gagamboy"(Spiderboy). After his shift, Dodoy comes into work and leaves a sandwich unprotected. A cockroach exposed to the same spill as the spider slips into his sandwich, and as he eats it, he collapses, only to regain consciousness as a large cockroach. He hires two henchmen and calls himself "Ipisman" (Cockroachman). Junie and Dodoy both try to win Liana's love. Dodoy practically gives up, only to return as Cockroachman to kidnap Liana to lure Spiderboy to his lair. There, he plans to finish off Spiderboy, but the tables turn, and Dodoy is destroyed.

== Cast ==
- Vhong Navarro as Junie/Spiderboy/Gagamboy and woman
- Jay Manalo as Dodoy/Cockroachman/Ipisman
- Aubrey Miles as Liana
- Long Mejia as Barangay Captain Gimo
- Bearwin Meily as Assistant Barangay Captain Abner
- Rene "Ate Glow" Facunla as Gloring
- Andrew Schimmer
- Benj Besa as Pip
- Kiel Rodriguez as Boyet
- Jay Aquitania as Guy
- Janine Desiderio as Aswang
- Mon Confiado as Snatcher
- Ogie Diaz as Stage Manager
- Benjamin Abellardo as Simeon
- Chris Cruz as Bronson
- Nikko Manalo as Boogie
- Ernie Zarate as Boss
- Kathryn Bernardo as Tsoknat
- Joseph Roble as Kiamoy
- Cyrus Valdez as Wiwi
- Rudy Victel as Jack
- Richard Somes as a security guard
- Olive Gloria as an ukay-ukay vendor
- Erik Matti as an ukay-ukay customer
- James Montelibano as a goon and a dumpsite worker
- Rashem Gumacal as a jailed drunk
- Ronald Asinas as a goon

== Production ==
=== Filming ===
According to director Erik Matti, Gagamboy served as the first film in the Philippine film industry to utilize wires and rigs for its sequences featuring flying and leaping. The production spent ₱2 million for constructing the shanty sets while ₱4 million was spent for the lead stars' costumes, which were designed by Benny and Liz Bactotoy.

=== Casting ===
According to lead star Vhong Navarro that while he initially thought of it as a joke, Regal Films founder and executive producer Lily Monteverde chose him to play the titular superhero.

== Release ==
The film was shown at the 2004 Hong Kong International Film Festival.

== Reception ==
=== Box office ===
The film opened on January 1, 2004, as a part of the 2003 Metro Manila Film Festival. The film opened seventh at the box office, earning 18 million in its first week, and eventually earning 27 million in its theatrical run.

=== Critical reception ===
Despite its low production qualities, the film received general praise due to its use of humor, especially in parodying other tokusatsu and superhero films. As a result, the film is well known in the Chinese kuso community.
