= My First Romance =

2003 Filipino romance film

- DVD Cover
- Directed by: John D. Lazatin ("One Love"); Don Cuaresma ("Two Hearts")
- Written by: Anna Gamboa; Guia Gonzales; Emmanuel dela Cruz; Michiko Yamamoto; Shaira Salvador; John Paul Abellera; Mariami Tanangco
- Screenplay by: Theodore Boborol ("One Love"); Tessa de Guzman ("One Love"); Mel Mendoza-del Rosario ("Two Hearts")
- Starring: John Lloyd Cruz; Bea Alonzo; John Prats; Heart Evangelista
- Cinematography: Gus Cruz ("One Love"); Charlie Peralta ("Two Hearts")
- Edited by: Vito Cajili
- Music by: Jessie Lasaten
- Production company: Star Cinema
- Release date: October 29, 2003
- Running time: 117 minutes
- Country: Philippines
- Language: Filipino
- Box office: ₱94.6 million

My First Romance is a 2003 Filipino romance anthology film starring John Lloyd Cruz, Bea Alonzo, John Prats and Heart Evangelista released under Star Cinema. The film did well at the box office with ₱94.6 million gross revenue.

The film's plot comprises two different stories: the first is called One Love, starring Prats and Evangelista, while the second is called Two Hearts, starring Cruz and Alonzo.

== Plot ==
=== One Love ===
One Love is about two people who fall in love with each other even if they live in two different worlds. Here, Jackie (Heart Evangelista) is the campus queen; she is rich, beautiful and is liked by everyone except Che (John Prats), who thinks that Jackie is just a shallow brat. After being forced to work together for school activities, Jackie made it a personal goal for Che to like her. Despite herself, she tries everything to please Che until she almost gives up hope. But with the presence of Jackie's Ate Glow, their personal belongings get mixed up. Because of this, both will discover the softer side of each other and their growing affections on the side, the two will eventually fall in love amidst the chaotic events that almost threatened their relationship.

- John Prats as Che Ricardo
- Heart Evangelista as Jackie Ocampo
- Cherie Gil as Jackie's mom
- Bonggoy Manahan as Jackie's dad
- Susan Africa as Che's mom
- Edwin Reyes as Che's dad
- John Lapus as Tiger (a talking dog)
- Sarita Perez de Tagle as Celine
- Carla Humphries as Guia
- Maoui David as Ria
- Dianne Tejada as Pia
- Pauleen Luna as Sharri
- Drew Arellano as Ryan Gatmaitan
- Ate Glow as Yaya Glow
- Nicholas Garcia as Edgar
- Peter Serrano as Designer
- Jason Cuvinar as Bokoy
- Reyvaric Cuvinar Jr. as Bambam

=== Two Hearts ===
Two Hearts is the second episode in My First Romance. Enzo (John Lloyd Cruz) is a star football player at school who loves the attention that he gets. However, he takes many things for granted but changes when he gets a heart problem and doctors say that only a heart transplant can save his life. Enzo gets a heart transplant after finding out that a guy who met an accident is a heart donor. This guy is the ex-boyfriend of Bianca (Bea Alonzo) who went to the States. Two years after the transplant, Enzo comes back to the Philippines and meets Bianca. She sees that Enzo and her ex-boyfriend are opposites but gives him a chance. After seeing the real Enzo, she appreciates him more and they slowly fall in love with each other but she still couldn't move on from her ex-boyfriend. Until a near death experience for Enzo changes her heart completely.

- John Lloyd Cruz as Enzo
- Bea Alonzo as Bianca
- Joel Torre as Dante
- Liza Lorena as Lourdes
- Chat Silayan as Azon
- Chanda Romero as Josie
- Mico Palanca as Kiko
- Anna Larrucea as Rhoda
- Alyson Lualhati as Carla
- Dominic Ochoa as Jojo
- Vivian Foz as Nelly
- Kathleen Hermosa as Janice
- Mandy Ochoa as Edgar
- Joshua Dionisio as Xavier

== Trivia ==
Prats and Evangelista were from Ang Tanging Ina (both film released in May and later became TV sitcom in August) while Cruz and Alonzo were from Kay Tagal Kang Hinintay (2 weeks before ended its 1-year run on November 13).

== Theme song ==
The theme song, "Please Be Careful With My Heart", was originally performed by Jose Mari Chan and Regine Velasquez. It was later used in Your Song's My Last Romance and in the 2012 morning drama series Be Careful With My Heart.
