= Berks (TV series) =

Philippine television drama series

- Title card
- Genre: Teen drama
- Directed by: Gilbert Perez
- Starring: Heart Evangelista; John Prats; Angelica Panganiban; Sarah Christophers
- Opening theme: "Blue Jeans"
- Composer: Jim Paredes
- Country of origin: Philippines
- Original language: Filipino
- No. of episodes: 67

Production
- Running time: 90 minutes

Original release
- Network: ABS-CBN
- Release: November 16, 2002 – March 20, 2004

Berks is a Philippine television drama series broadcast by ABS-CBN. Directed by Gilbert Perez, it stars Heart Evangelista, John Prats, Angelica Panganiban, and Sarah Christophers. It premiered on November 16, 2002. The show concluded on March 20, 2004, with a total of 67 episodes.

== Premise ==
The series follows a close-knit group of friends and explores their friendship and experiences together.

== Cast and characters ==
The cast of Berks

Lead cast

- Heart Evangelista as Gwyneth Garcia
- John Prats as Javier Montelibano
- Sarah Christophers as Pamela Sue
- Angelica Panganiban as Nicole

Main cast

- Karel Marquez as Penelope
- Hazel Ann Mendoza as Brooke
- Ketchup Eusebio as Ketchup
- Marc Acueza as Oreo
- Khalil Kaimo as Nacho
- Alysson Lualhati as Jennifer Love
- Greg Martin as Bruce
- Jay Salas as Chad
- Glaiza de Castro as Halley
- Pocholo Baretto as Simon
- Carlo Aquino as Aries

Supporting cast

- Winnie Cordero as Tita Potty
- Joy Chiong as Oprah
- John Wayne Sace
- Jojit Lorenzo
- Chris Quimpo as Miguel
- Rafael Rosell as George
- Pauleen Luna as Kate

Guest cast

- Jenny Miller as Gwyneth's stepmother
- Mandy Ochoa as Gwyneth's father
- Carla Humphries as Paris
- Kristoffer Horace Neudeck as Gwyneth's brother
- Jackie Castillejo as Nicole's aunt
- Joy Viado
- Mahal
- Gigette Reyes
- Joel Torre as Javie's father
- Carmi Martin as Javie's mother
- Sharmaine Arnaiz as Javie's stepmother
- Carlos Agassi
- Gandong Cervantes as Oreo's father
- Girlie Alcantara as Oreo's mother
- Dustin Reyes
