= Hazel Ann Mendoza =

Filipino actress

- Born: Lourdes Angelic Teofisto Pla; Barcelona, Spain
- Other name: Hazel
- Years active: 1996–2010

Hazel Ann Mendoza (born Lourdes Angelic Teofisto Pla) is a Filipino former actress and a former Star Magic talent. Her late father was Spanish-English and also the father of former actress Nadia Montenegro. She became an artist of GMA Network for half-year.

== Education ==
Mendoza studied in Adamson University with the degree in Bachelor of Science in education.

== Current and last career ==
In 2009, Mendoza moved back to GMA Network via Darna and Bantatay for her last appearance in 2010 until she decided to leave show business.

== Filmography ==
=== Film ===
Year	Title	Role
1999	Wansapanataym: The Movie	Housewife's daughter (credited as Pupi Pla)
2000	Anak	Young Carla
2004	Volta	Teenage Perla

=== Television ===
Year	Title	Role
1999	Wansapanataym: Madyik Pitsel	Lily
2000–2002	Pangako Sa 'Yo	Flerida Macaspac
2000	Wansapanataym: Tik Tak Tik Takbo	
2001	Wansapanataym: Bulaklak ni Rosa	
2002–2004	Berks	Brooke
2003–2004	Basta't Kasama Kita	Pretty
2005	Qpids	Herself
2006	Gulong ng Palad	Nene
2006	Love Spell: Charm & Crystal	Erika
2006	Maalaala Mo Kaya: Airport	Prima
2007	Pedro Penduko at ang Mga Engkantao	Melinda
2007	Sine Novela: Kung Mahawi Man ang Ulap	Chona Acuesta
2007	La Vendetta	Young Amanda
2008	Sine Novela: Una Kang Naging Akin	Violy
2008–2009	Eva Fonda	Daldit/Chariz
2009	Darna	Annaliza (guest role)
2010	Bantatay	Madonna
