= Felisa Batacan =

Filipino journalist and writer

Maria Felisa H. Batacan is a Filipino journalist and a writer of crime and mystery fiction. Her work has been published in the Philippines and abroad under the name F.H. Batacan.

== Biography ==
She was a fellow at the 1996 Dumaguete National Writers' Workshop.

Batacan worked in the Philippine intelligence community and then became a broadcast journalist. She attended the University of the Philippines Diliman, where she pursued a master's degree in Arts Studies. In 1999 her manuscript, Smaller and Smaller Circles, won the Don Carlos Palanca Memorial Awards for Literature Grand Prize for the English Novel. This novel was published in 2002 by the University of the Philippines Press. Although most Filipino English-language fiction works garner a single print run of only 1,000 copies, Smaller and Smaller Circles had been reprinted four times by the year 2006, for a total of 6,000 copies. The novel was one of the first Filipino works of crime fiction.

The novel also won the 2002 Manila Critics’ Circle National Book Award and the Madrigal-Gonzales Best First Book Award in 2003.

In 2008, she won 1st prize in the English short story category of the Philippines Free Press Literary Awards.

In 2015, a new, expanded edition of the novel was published by Soho Press, New York.

== Sources ==
- Christian, Ed (2010), "Ethnic Postcolonial Crime and Detection (Anglophone)", in Rzepka, Charles; Horlsey, Lee (eds.), A Companion to Crime Fiction, Wiley-Blackwell
- Hidalgo, Cristina Pantoja (2006), Over a Cup of Ginger Tea: Conversations on the Literary Narratives of Filipino Women, University of the Philippines Press, ISBN 978-971-542-524-7
- Yuson, Alfred A. (September 1, 2008), The Palanca, Free Press & UMPIL literary awards, The Philippine STAR
- de Vera, Ruel (June 20, 2016), Filipino crime novel ‘Smaller and Smaller Circles’ now a movie, Philippine Daily Inquirer
