= Wazzup Wazzup =

- Genre: News satire
- Created by: ABS-CBN Corporation
- Presented by: Toni Gonzaga; Vhong Navarro; Archie Alemania; Various contributors
- Country of origin: Philippines
- Original languages: Filipino; English
- No. of episodes: n/a (airs daily)

Production
- Camera setup: Multiple-camera setup
- Running time: 30 minutes

Original release
- Network: Studio 23
- Release: March 1, 2004 – July 20, 2007

Wazzup Wazzup is a Philippine television news satire show broadcast by Studio 23. Starring Vhong Navarro, Toni Gonzaga and Archie Alemania, it aired from March 1, 2004 to July 20, 2007.

In the show's first season, the news anchors were Vhong Navarro, Toni Gonzaga and Drew Arellano. Conflicts with Arellano's programs on rival GMA Network forced him to give up the show to focus on other programs he had with GMA.

Although no admission or comment had been released by ABS-CBN, Wazzup Wazzup was notably very similar in form and concept with the popular Argentine show CQC which has been adapted and shown in five other countries.

The theme music of Wazzup Wazzup is originally based on “Whatz Up, Whatz Up” by Playa Poncho, and LA Sno and performed by Akafellas.

In April 2006, Wazzup Wazzup was reformatted with the new set including a News Desk and a Stage instead of a Coffee Shop (e.g. Gloria Jean's Coffees) and/or a Juice Bar.

== Anchors ==
=== Final anchors ===
- Vhong Navarro (2004–2007)
- Toni Gonzaga (2004–2007)
- Archie Alemania (2004–2007)

=== Final TadJocks ===
- Niña Dolino a.k.a. Chief Tadjock
- Say Alonzo a.k.a. News Bebot
- Dianne Medina a.k.a. Tadjock Over Active
- Eri Neeman a.k.a. Running Tadjock
- Vincent Liwanag
- Teddy Corpuz a.k.a. Tedjock (from Rocksteddy)

=== Former anchors ===
- Drew Arellano (2004–2005; moved to GMA Network)

=== 4th anchors/guest anchors ===
- Zanjoe Marudo
- Makisig Morales
- Sam Concepcion
- Bea Alonzo
- John Lloyd Cruz
- Meryll Soriano
- Sam Milby
- Anne Curtis
- Margerie Romero
- Aljo Bendijo
- Iya Villania
- Rey Langit

=== Former field reporters/TadJocks ===
- Jaja Bolivar as Kikiam
- Mitch Hernandez as Lookah
- Karel Marquez
- JC Cuadrado
- Ketchup Eusebio
- Bianca Gonzalez
- Boomboom Gonzales
- Jaja Gonzales
- Carla Humphries
- Bianca Valerio
- DJ Mike
- Jay Eigenmann and James Gabrillo
- Alvie Lacanlale
- Sarah Christophers
- Darling Lavinia
- Wallace Tiktik
- CJ Navato
- Steve Dailisan

== See also ==
- List of programs broadcast by Studio 23
