= Bituin =

2002–03 Philippine television drama series

- Title card
- Also known as: Star
- Genre: Drama; Musical
- Created by: ABS-CBN Studios
- Directed by: Wenn V. Deramas; Trina N. Dayrit; John D. Lazatin; Malu L. Sevilla
- Starring: Nora Aunor; Carol Banawa; Cherie Gil; Desiree del Valle
- Ending theme: "Langit na Bituin" by Carol Banawa
- Country of origin: Philippines
- Original language: Filipino
- No. of episodes: 172

Production
- Executive producer: Nini S. Matilac
- Camera setup: Multiple-camera setup
- Running time: 25-30 minutes

Original release
- Network: ABS-CBN
- Release: September 23, 2002 – May 23, 2003

Bituin (international title: Star) is a Philippine television drama series broadcast by ABS-CBN. Starring Carol Banawa, Desiree del Valle, Nora Aunor and Cherie Gil. It aired on the network's Teleserye Primetime Bida line up from September 23, 2002 to May 23, 2003, replacing Pangako Sa 'Yo and was replaced by Basta't Kasama Kita.

== Premise ==
Laura Sandoval and Carmela Gaston are half sisters who grew up with Carmela's mom, Doña Virginia Gaston not treating Laura right. When they grew older Carmela Remain Unmarried while Laura marries Badong. After their second child, she found out he had been cheating on her.

As a single mother she was struggling to support her two daughters Melody and Bernadette. When her eldest Melody becomes sick, Laura goes to Carmela asking for help, who says that she will help if she hands over Bernadette so she may raise her as her own. With no one left to turn to Laura does it.

Carmela left for the United States to raise Bernadette and soon returns as a singer. In a concert, Laura knew their whereabouts. The kids grow up not knowing they are sisters. Melody notices that Laura is much closer to Bernadette, such as Laura teaching Bernadette to sing when she forbids Melody to do so. Bernadette becomes a star by recording Melody's voice and claiming it as her own. Both soon become singers. Melody finds her father and wins the heart of a young man named Dante.

In the end they all become a family: Badong and Laura find their love again, Carmela is no longer jealous of her sister, Doña Virginia gave the rightful will of her husband to Laura, Melody is a great singer and marries Josh Santana who is her singing partner, and Bernadette becomes a famous composer, especially the song she composed for her sister as a way to show she was sorry called "Sana Bukas"; she marries Dante, whom she fell in love with accidentally when she tried to help him win Melody's heart.

== Plot ==
In the story, Laura (Nora Aunor†) and Carmela (Cherie Gil†) were revealed to be half-sisters, raised under the same roof but treated very differently. Laura, the illegitimate daughter, endured years of mistreatment from Carmela’s mother, Doña Virginia (Celia Rodriguez).

As adults, Laura married Ador (Michael de Mesa), a singer working abroad. For a while, life seemed hopeful until everything crumbled. After the birth of their second child, Laura received a heartbreaking letter from Ador all the way from Japan. He confessed to having an affair and made the devastating decision to abandon his family in the Philippines for another woman.

Suddenly a single mother to two young daughters, Melody and Bernadette, Laura struggled to make ends meet. Her only ally through the hardships was her loyal friend Diony (Gardo Versoza). Things took a turn for the worse when Melody was diagnosed with a congenital heart disease. Desperate and with nowhere else to turn, Laura swallowed her pride and asked Carmela for help.

Carmela, in a rare act of apparent kindness, agreed to finance Melody’s treatment. But Diony warned Laura to be cautious, as Carmela's generosity seemed suspicious. True enough, Carmela used the opportunity to manipulate Laura into handing over Bernadette for adoption. When Laura resisted, Carmela coldly threatened to stop paying for Melody’s treatment. Trapped and desperate to save the ailing Melody, Laura was forced to give up Bernadette.

What Laura didn’t expect was that Carmela would soon flee the country and raise Bernadette in the United States, leaving her grieving not just the betrayal, but the absence of the daughter she was blackmailed into losing.

Because of everything she had gone through, Laura’s heart grew heavy with bitterness. The deep longing for her lost child hardened her. She became distant and cold, even to her remaining daughter, Melody, who grew up with a clear passion and talent for singing. Laura refused to support Melody's dreams. As a former singer herself, music once brought Laura joy, but had become a painful reminder of her past. Laura stopped Melody from singing even when the child only sang to help them survive.

Carmela soon returned to the country as a celebrated singer. Wanting nothing more than to make her mother smile, Melody saved up every peso she earned from working at the school canteen and selling sampaguita on the streets to buy a concert ticket for Laura, knowing how much her mother wanted it. And that was the night Laura finally laid eyes on the child she was forced to give up six years ago.

Bernadette and Melody grew up unaware that they were sisters, just as the papers Laura had signed years ago dictated—she couldn’t tell the children the truth. Bound by the promise she made, Laura resigned herself to the role of an aunt to Bernadette.

Just like her sister Melody, Bernadette also tried to step into the music scene, but unlike Melody, she did not inherit the musical gift of their mother, Laura.

Influenced by her mother Carmela and grandmother Doña Virginia’s manipulation, Bernadette was forced to use a recording of Melody’s voice, claiming it as her own. This deceit propelled her to fame, and Bernadette soon found herself loving the stardom. She learned to enjoy the adoration and attention that came from lip-syncing to Melody's voice.

But soon, a golden opportunity arrived for Melody, leading her to pursue a career in music as well. As fate would have it, Laura's daughters became rivals in the same industry.

Meanwhile, Laura’s life wasn’t easy. She faced a series of challenges, such as when Doña Virginia seized the property that her father had left her. Carmela and Doña Virginia also went as far as to accuse her of kidnapping Bernadette, a false narrative they spun to imprison her. In one scene in jail, Nora delighted audiences with her rendition of "Sana Ngayong Pasko."

But in the end, love and forgiveness prevailed. After all the pain, betrayal and years lost, Laura and Ador found their way back to each other. Melody (Carol Banawa) and Bernadette (Desiree del Valle) chose sisterhood over resentment, and so did Laura and Carmela.

== Cast and characters ==
=== Main cast ===
- Nora Aunor † as Laura Sandoval
- Cherie Gil † as Carmela Gaston
- Carol Banawa as Melody Sandoval
  - Kristel Fulgar as young Melody
- Desiree del Valle as Bernadette Gaston
  - Eliza Pineda as young Bernadette
- Carlo Muñoz as Dante
- Michael Santana as Josh Santana
- Michael de Mesa as Salvador Sandoval
- Gardo Versoza as Diony
- Cherry Pie Picache as Olivia
- Celia Rodriguez as Doña Virginia Gaston
- Jessa Zaragoza as Sultanna Andromeda "Andromeda"-left the series during her pregnancy and taped her finale episodes
- Ronaldo Valdez † as Amante Montesilverio
- Chat Silayan † as Elvira Montesilverio
- Tess Aquino as Madonna
- Frank Garcia as Alex Montesilverio
- Geoff Rodriguez as Dave Montesilverio
- Kuh Ledesma as Lyrica Luna

=== Supporting cast ===
- Efren Reyes Jr. as Arnel
- Ricardo Cepeda as Conrado
- Emilio Garcia as Ernesto
- Lui Villaruz as Boom
- John Apacible † as Willy
- Perla Bautista as Ofelia
- Rodel Velayo as Jimmy
- Camille Prats as Lovelyn Gaston
- Mat Ranillo III as Filemon Gaston
- Sylvia Sanchez as Eva
- Tado † as King
- John Lapus as Queenie
- Harlene Bautista as Tootsie
- Rochelle Barrameda as Leila
- Anita Linda † as Rustica
- Jestoni Alarcon as Bienvenido Galang
- Gigette Reyes as Dra. Reyes
- Julia Clarete as Agnes Gandoza
- Romnick Sarmenta as Pepito
- Camilla Villamil as Melai

=== Cameo appearances ===
- John Lloyd Cruz as Atty. Yuri Orbida (from the character of Kay Tagal Kang Hinintay)
- Bea Alonzo as Atty. Kathrina Argos (from the character of Kay Tagal Kang Hinintay)
- Kris Aquino
- Boy Abunda
- Ogie Diaz as Ogie
- Carlos Agassi
- Robert Seña
- John Lesaca
- Ryan Eigenmann
- Dessa
- Franco Laurel
- Divo Bayer
- Cooky Chua
- Agot Isidro
- Julius Babao
- Christine Bersola-Babao
- Edu Manzano
- Julio Diaz
- Tirso Cruz III
- Dolly de Leon
- Randy Santiago
- Bayani Agbayani
- Willie Revillame
- Ai-Ai Delas Alas
- Romi Sison
- Dindo de Viterbo
- Tonette Escario

== Reception ==
This was Nora Aunor's acting comeback after her shortlived stint on the series "Nora", a drama anthology that launched the second incarnation “Star Drama Anthology”. The series also launched the careers of Carol Banawa and Desiree Del Valle who played supporting roles in various TV and films. Senior stars such as Chat Silayan, Ronaldo Valdez, Celia Rodriguez and Cherie Gil played big roles in the series varying away from films.

=== Ratings ===
Its highest rating was 48.7% for the "Ultimate Showdown: The Diva VS The Supernova" of Melody and Bernadette at the Araneta Coliseum, while the lowest was 29.5%, its fifth episode.

In 2002, the series aired as the first line up of Teleserye Primetime Bida at 7:00 PM, followed up by Sa Puso Ko, Iingatan Ka (until February 14, 2003), Kay Tagal Kang Hinintay and Sa Dulo ng Walang Hanggan (until February 28, 2003).

== See also ==
- List of programs broadcast by ABS-CBN
- List of ABS-CBN drama series
