= Josh Santana =

Filipino actor and singer (born 1983)

- Origin: Metro Manila, Philippines
- Genres: Pop
- Occupations: Singer, actor
- Instrument: Vocals
- Years active: 2001–2012; 2022–present
- Website: myspace.com/kareemsalama/

Michael Alexander Alvarez Pamular (born 18 June 1983), better known by his stage name Josh Santana, is a former television actor and singer.

== Career ==
Santana rose to popularity in 2003 as the male love interest of Carol Banawa in the TV series Bituin. It was from the character he played in Bituin where he took the name Josh Santana.

== Acting ==
In Bituin, Santana played the role of a very popular Filipino actor-singer from whom Melody Sandoval (played by Carol Banawa) seeks help in launching her singing career. However, he despises her having come from a poor provincial family.

== Singing ==
After Bituin, Santana focused on his singing career and eventually he was given another shot when he recorded the theme song of Basta't Kasama Kita, followed by a Tagalog adaptation of "情非得已 (Qing fei de yi)" (originally sung by Taiwanese pop singer Harlem Yu) titled "Can't Help Fallin'" as the theme song of Meteor Garden.

Santana left show business after he released the theme song of the teen-oriented TV programme Qpids titled "Dito sa Puso Ko", which featured the then new discovery Nikki Gil.

== Discography ==
=== Josh Santana ===
In 2004, Santana released a 10-track self-tiled album containing:

- "Hindi Ko Kaya" (lyrics & music by: Aaron Paul Del Rosario / arranged by: Paolo Zarate)
- "Muli" (lyrics & music by: Rhoen Del Monte & Romwell / arranged by: Paolo Zarate)
- "Mahal Na Mahal Ko Siya" (lyrics & music by: Gary Valenciano / arranged by: Paolo Zarate)
- "Nasaan Ka?" (lyrics & music by: Jonathan Manalo / arranged by: Paolo Zarate)
- "Maibabalik Ko Ba?" (lyrics & music by: Marc Bryan R. Adona / arranged by: Paolo Zarate)
- "Mahal Naman Kita" (lyrics & music by: Marizen Yaneza / arranged by: Gino "Blooze" Cruz)
- "Can't Help Fallin'" (Tagalog adaptation) (lyrics & music by: Chang Keat Siong / arranged by: Jun Tamayo)
- "Pagkat sa Pangarap (lyrics & music by: Larry Hermoso / arranged by: Elmer Blancaflor)
- "Ikaw Lang Pala" (lyrics & music by: Joanthan Florido / arranged by: Arnold Cabalza)
- "Journey of a Smile" (lyrics & music by: Markel Luna / arranged by: Paolo Zarate)

Note: Some of his songs were compiled with Divo Bayer's and King's songs into an album titled Solo.

=== Josh Santana: Eres Tú ===
In March 2009, Santana released a 10-track album entitled Josh Santana: Eres Tú.

The album is described as "Fil-Hispano", containing:

- Three original songs:
  - "Kahit Minsan Lang" (composed by Marlon Silva)
  - "Magpakailanman" (composed Marlon Silva)
  - "Estar Contigo" (composed by Josh Santana himself)
- Cover versions:
  - "Historia de un Amor" (Spanish)
  - "Eres Tú" (Spanish)
  - "Hate That I Love You" (Spanish/English)
  - "Eres Mío" (Spanish/Tagalog)
  - "Dreaming of You" (originally by Selena)
  - "I Don't Wanna Lose You Now" (originally by Gloria Estefan)

== Filmography ==
=== Television ===
- ASAP Natin 'To as himself/performer (2002–2006)
