= Eliza Pineda =

Filipino actress

- Born: Maria Eliza Pineda Bautista; August 23, 1995 (age 30); Quezon City, Metro Manila, Philippines
- Occupations: Actress, model, singer
- Years active: 2002–present
- Agents: Star Magic (2002–2017); GMA Artist Center (2017–2019)
- Relatives: Jennylyn Mercado (cousin); Enzo Pineda (cousin); Charee Pineda (cousin)

Maria Eliza Pineda Bautista (born August 23, 1995), or better known as Eliza Pineda, is a Filipino actress.

== Early career ==
Pineda is an original talent of ABS-CBN from 2002 to 2017 whose she is also a former child actress in a various acting skills like drama, action and comedy.

== Current career ==
Pineda's appearances include Mga Anghel na Walang Langit, Maria Flordeluna and Kung Fu Kids.

Pineda moved to GMA Network in 2017 and reunited with former Maria Flordeluna co-star Kyline Alcantara in Kambal Karibal in 2018, with new co-stars Bianca Umali, Miguel Tanfelix and Pauline Mendoza.

She recently seen in a fantasy comedy show Daig Kayo ng Lola Ko in 2019 on GMA Network.

== Personal life ==
She has two sisters named Katrina Pineda and Jacqueline Pineda.

She is related to Charee Pineda.

== Filmography ==
=== Film ===
Year	Title	Role	Notes	Source
2003	Till There Was You	Pippa Robles		
2006	D' Lucky Ones	Young Lucky Girl		
2007	Enteng Kabisote 4: Okay Ka Fairy Ko...The Beginning of the Legend	Flora	Special participation	
2010	I Do	Sharleen		
2011	Thelma	Hanna		
2015	Haunted Mansion	Jessie		
2016	Tiniente Gimo	Ella		

=== Television ===
Year	Title	Role	Notes	Source
2001–2002	Sa Dulo ng Walang Hanggan	Petra		
2002	Bituin	Young Bernadette		
2002	Chikiting Patrol	Herself/host		
2003	Wansapanataym	Bamba	Episode: "Ting 'n Tess"	
2004	Sarah the Teen Princess	Belle		
2005–07	Goin' Bulilit	Various Roles		
2005–06	Mga Anghel na Walang Langit	Sydney		
2006	Komiks Presents: Bampy	Bampy	Parts 1 & 2	
2006	Calla Lily	Lilly		
2007	Your Song Presents: Ikaw Lamang			
2007	Maria Flordeluna	Maria Flordeluna "Flor" Alicante	Main role / Protagonist	
2008	Sineserye Presents: Patayin Sa Sindak Si Barbara	Young Barbara		
2008	Kung Fu Kids	Saranelle "Sarah" Magalang		
2008	Maalaala Mo Kaya	Kat Kat	Episode: "Popcorn	
2009	Maalaala Mo Kaya	Leslie	Episode: "Relo"	
2009	Tayong Dalawa	Ingrid Martinez-Garcia		
2010	Maalaala Mo Kaya	Maricel	Episode: "Bahay"	
2010	Maalaala Mo Kaya	Carla Francisco	Episode: "Bracelet"	
2011	Wansapanataym	Mean Girl	Episode: Flores de Mayumi	
2011	Angelito: Batang Ama	Rowena Dimaano		
2012	Maalaala Mo Kaya	Xandra	Episode: "Motorsiklo"	
2012	Angelito: Ang Bagong Yugto	Rowena Dimaano		
2012	Wansapanataym	Teen Olivia	Episode: "Yaya Yaya Puto Maya"	
2013	Maalaala Mo Kaya	Maribel	Episode: "Gown"	
2013	Maalaala Mo Kaya	Reina Manlangit	Episode: "Rosaryo"	
2014	Maalaala Mo Kaya	Janine	Episode: "Dos Por Dos"	
2014	Maalaala Mo Kaya	Cecile	Episode: "Panyo"	
2015	Maalaala Mo Kaya	Arianne	Episode: "Hagdanan"	
2016	Maalaala Mo Kaya	Isabel	Episode: "Singkwenta Pesos"	
2017	Daig Kayo ng Lola Ko	Prinsesa Rosa	Episode: "Sleeping Beauty"	
2017–2018	Kambal, Karibal	Patricia	Supporting role / Antagonist	
2018	Magpakailanman	Hannah Rioteta	Episode: "The Kyline Alcantara Story"	
2018	Daig Kayo ng Lola Ko	Lion	Episode: "Hercules"	
2020	Dear Uge	Various	Funny Girl	
