= Rosario Silayan-Bailon =

Filipino beauty queen and actress

Chat Silayan
- Born: Maria Rosario Rivera Silayan; July 8, 1959; Manila, Philippines
- Died: April 23, 2006 (aged 46); Quezon City, Philippines
- Beauty pageant titleholder
- Title: Binibining Pilipinas Universe 1980
- Years active: 1981–2005
- Major competitions: Binibining Pilipinas 1980 (Winner); Miss Universe 1980; (3rd Runner-Up)

Maria Rosario Rivera Silayan-Bailon (July 8, 1959 – April 23, 2006), also known as Chat Silayan, was a Filipino actress and beauty pageant titleholder. She won the Binibining Pilipinas Universe 1980 crown and became the third runner-up at Miss Universe 1980. A year after her stint in Miss Universe, her acting career began and she became one of the most popular and acclaimed actresses in the Philippines. She was the daughter of theatre and movie actor Vic Silayan and the aunt of Victor Silayan. She retired from acting in 2003 and became active in church activities and worked as a part-time announcer and host for The 700 Club Asia.

== Career ==
In May 1989, Silayan co-hosted the 37th FAMAS Awards with Roy Alvarez.

== Illness and death ==
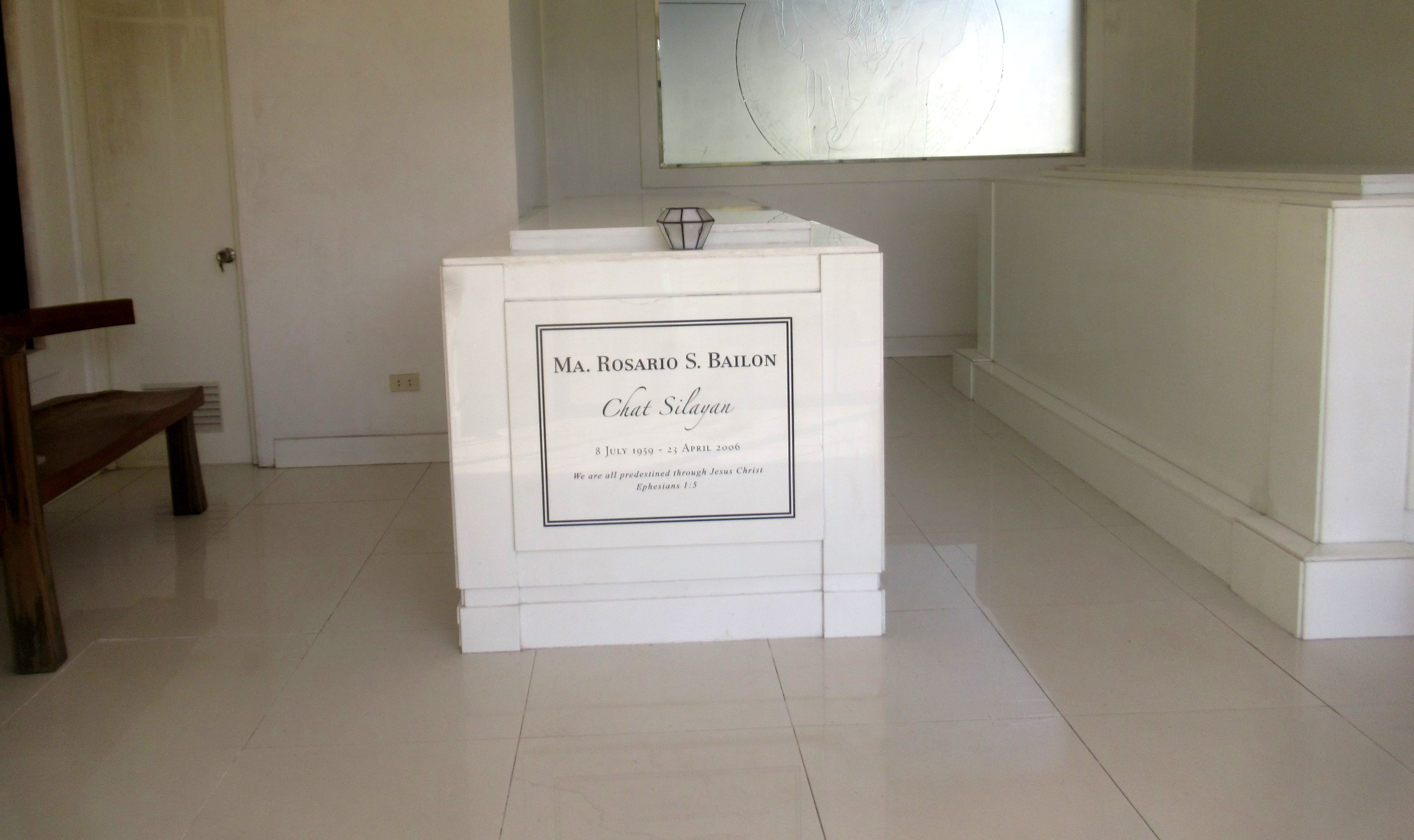
Silayan-Bailon's grave at Manila Memorial Park – Sucat.

In 2004, Silayan's battle with cancer started in April when she underwent surgery on her colon, one foot of which was cut. For a while, she felt relief, only for the pain to recur a year later. Her doctors told her she had only one year to live.

After 2 years of battle, on the early morning of April 23, 2006, Silayan died in her sleep while confined at St. Luke's Medical Center in Quezon City at the age of 46.

She is survived by her three children, Victor (from her previous relationship with an Italian director); and her children with husband Mike Bailon, Timothy and Michaela.

== Filmography ==
=== Film ===
Year	Title	Role	Note(s)	Ref(s).
1981	Ang Maestro			
1981	Kamakalawa	Amihan		
1982	Ang Tapang para sa Lahat!			
1982	Wanted: Leon Mercado			
1982	Five and the Skin			
1984	Kung Tawagin Siya'y Animal			
1986	Kailan Tama ang Mali?			
1988	The Commander	Ling		
1988	Ang Supremo			
1988	Ompong Galapong: May Ulo, Walang Tapon	Ester		
1989	Irosin: Pagputok ng Araw, Babaha ng Dugo			
1990	Dyesebel	Banang		
1997	Ipaglaban Mo! The Movie Part II	Marta Agoncillo	First segment	
1999	Esperanza: The Movie	Ester		
2003	Kung Ako Na Lang Sana	Tia Lea		
2003	My First Romance	Azon	"Two Hearts" segment	

=== Television ===
- Student Canteen (1981–1986)
- Swerte sa Siete
- Maalaala Mo Kaya (1991–1994)
- Noli Me Tangere (1993) - Sinang
- Esperanza (1997–1999) - Ester
- Sa Dulo ng Walang Hanggan (2001-2003) - Lita
- Bituin (2002–2003) - Elvira Montesilverio
- The 700 Club Asia - TV host (2003–2005)
