= University of the Philippines Press =

Philippine university press

- Parent company: University of the Philippines
- Founded: March 16, 1965
- Country of origin: Philippines
- Headquarters location: Diliman, Quezon City
- Publication types: Books
- Official website: press.up.edu.ph

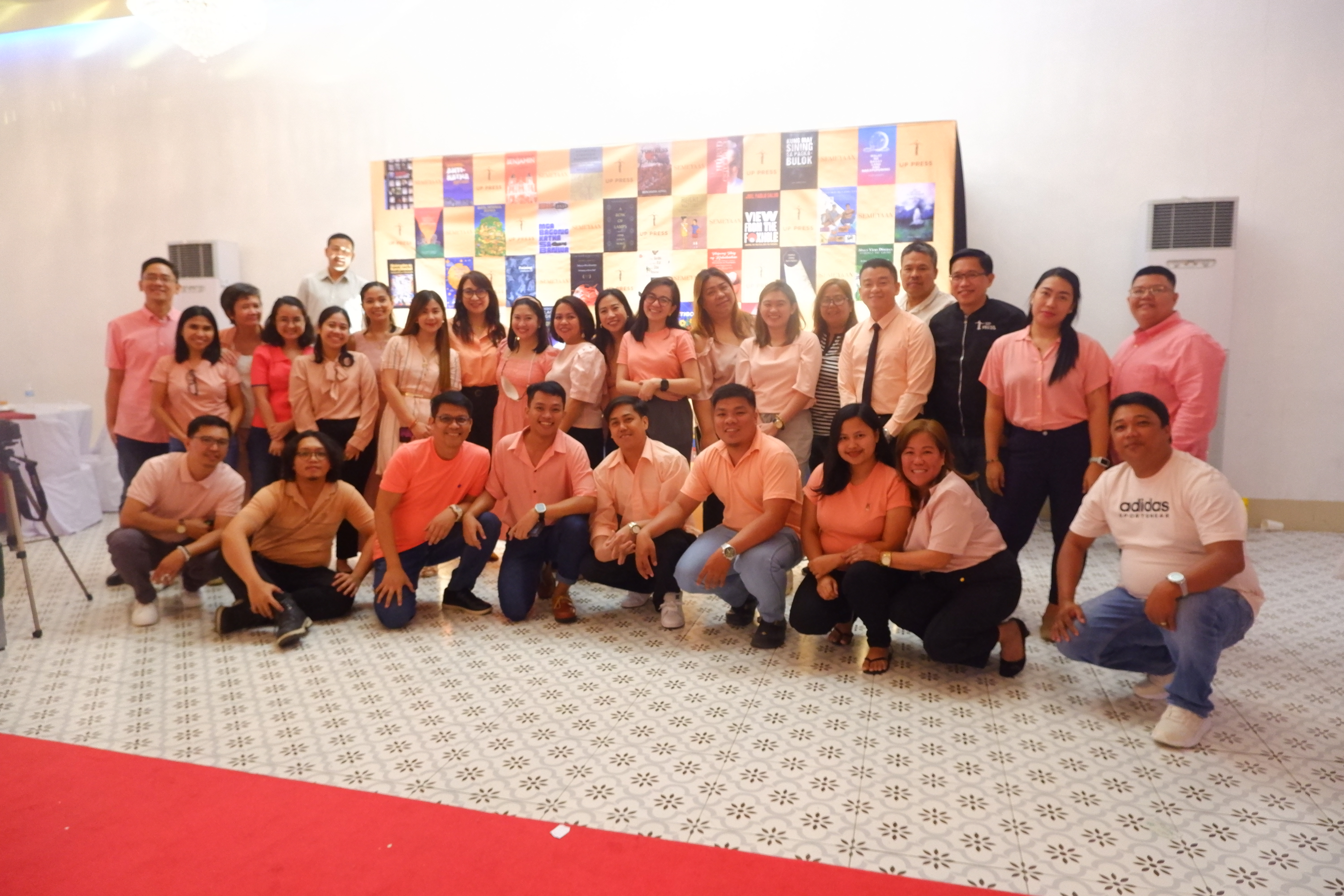
UP Press staff at SEMEYAAN Paglulunsad ng mga Bagong Aklat ng UP Press 2023

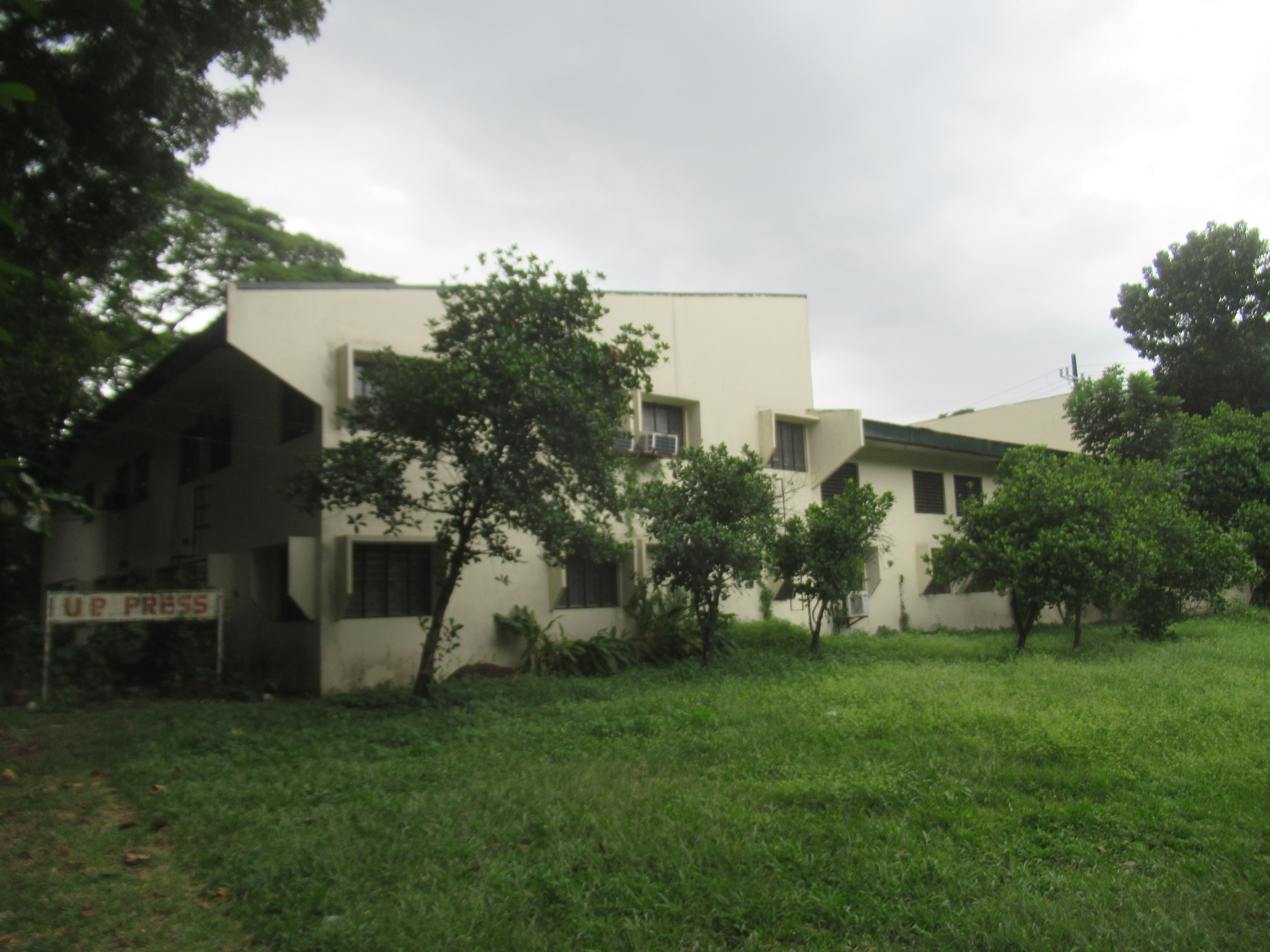
2024 façade

The University of the Philippines Press (or the U.P. Press) is the official publishing house for all constituent units of the University of the Philippines. It is the first university press in the country, established on March 16, 1965.

The UP Press is mandated to encourage, publish, and disseminate scholarly, creative, and scientific works that represent distinct contributions to knowledge in various academic disciplines, which commercial publishers would not ordinarily undertake to publish. Its main office is located at the University of the Philippines Diliman. The press is currently headed by linguist, researcher, and professor Galileo Zafra.
