= List of La Luna Sangre episodes =

La Luna Sangre (transl. The Blood Moon) is a 2017 Philippine horror-fantasy drama television series. Directed by Jerry Lopez Sineneng, Cathy Garcia-Molina, Richard Arellano, Rory Quintos, Frasco S. Mortiz and Mae Cruz-Alviar, it stars Kathryn Bernardo, Daniel Padilla, Richard Gutierrez, and Angel Locsin. It is the third and the final installment in the Moonstone trilogy and the sequel to both Lobo and Imortal. The series premiered on ABS-CBN's Primetime Bida evening block and worldwide on The Filipino Channel on June 19, 2017 to March 2, 2018, replacing My Dear Heart.

This horror-fantasy drama television series is about Malia, Mateo and Lia's daughter, who finds her place in the world of mortals, while training for the time when she must fight against the cursed vampire, Supremo. But while preparing for her destined battle, she meets Tristan, a man whose past experiences will turn him into someone that will love but also destroy Malia.

== Episodes ==
=== 2017 ===
==== June 2017 ====
Episode		Original Air Date	Social Media hashtag	Synopsis	Kantar Media Nationwide		
Episode		Original Air Date	Social Media hashtag	Synopsis	Rating	Timeslot rank	Primetime rank
1	Ang Simula (The Beginning)	June 19, 2017	#LaLunaSangreAngSimula	After turning into mortals, Mateo and Lia live a peaceful life with their lovely daughter Malia but Baristo informs them of Jethro's prophecy. Sandrino and his coven of rebel vampires begin their search for Malia while Mateo and Lia put their lives on the line to protect Malia.	33.9%	1	2
2	Ang Propesiya (The Prophecy)	June 20, 2017	#LaLunaSangreAngPropesiya	After turning into mortals, Mateo and Lia live a peaceful life with their lovely daughter Malia but Baristo informs them of Jethro's prophecy. Sandrino and his coven of rebel vampires begin their search for Malia while Mateo and Lia put their lives on the line to protect Malia.	35.0%	1	2
3	Ang Itinakda (The Chosen One)	June 21, 2017	#LaLunaSangreAngItinakda	After turning into mortals, Mateo and Lia live a peaceful life with their lovely daughter Malia but Baristo informs them of Jethro's prophecy. Sandrino and his coven of rebel vampires begin their search for Malia while Mateo and Lia put their lives on the line to protect Malia.	33.6%	1	2
4	Ang Panganib (The Danger)	June 22, 2017	#LaLunaSangreAngPanganib	After turning into mortals, Mateo and Lia live a peaceful life with their lovely daughter Malia but Baristo informs them of Jethro's prophecy. Sandrino and his coven of rebel vampires begin their search for Malia while Mateo and Lia put their lives on the line to protect Malia.	33.9%	1	2
5	Ang Paghaharap (The Confrontation)	June 23, 2017	#LaLunaSangreAngPaghaharap	After turning into mortals, Mateo and Lia live a peaceful life with their lovely daughter Malia but Baristo informs them of Jethro's prophecy. Sandrino and his coven of rebel vampires begin their search for Malia while Mateo and Lia put their lives on the line to protect Malia.	35.2%	1	2
6	Bagong Mundo (New Worlds)	June 26, 2017	#LaLunaSangreBagongMundo	After barely escaping Sandrino, Malia goes into hiding along with the other La Liga Unida vampires and werewolves. During Malia's training, the members of the council await the unveiling of Malia's powers on the night of her 21st birthday. But after several attempts, Malia fails to summon her supernatural powers. Malia also discovers that Jake knows where Lia was laid to rest. As Malia arrives at the cemetery she crosses paths with Tristan. Until the two sneak into an exclusive party where Malia bumps into vampires, Elisse and Terrene.	34.5%	1	2
7	Tungkulin (Responsibility)	June 27, 2017	#LaLunaSangreTungkulin		34.0%	1	2
8	Kabilugan (Full Moon)	June 28, 2017	#LaLunaSangreKabilugan		32.8%	1	2
9	Tadhana (Destiny)	June 29, 2017	#LaLunaSangreTadhana		35.1%	1	2
10	Dugo (Blood)	June 30, 2017	#LaLunaSangreDugo		32.8%	1	2
La Luna Sangre is the 2nd most watched program in June 2017 with 34.1% average rating.

==== July 2017 ====
Episode		Original Air Date	Social Media hashtag	Synopsis	Kantar Media Nationwide		
Episode		Original Air Date	Social Media hashtag	Synopsis	Rating	Timeslot rank	Primetime rank
11	Pangitain (Vision)	July 3, 2017	#LaLunaSangrePangitain	Sandrino is determined to find Malia after learning that Jethro's prophecy still holds true. Malia insists on fulfilling her prophecy despite her lack of powers. However, Sandrino plans to have a public message directed to Malia. The message immediately alerts Luna, and Toto heightens their activities to protect the chosen one at all costs. Veruska gets into a violent encounter with Sandrino and she announces to the La Liga Unida that she was able to kill Sandrino. As they arrive in the camp Malia and Luna members find an army attacked and ravaged by vampires.	34.8%	1	2
12	Patunay (Proof)	July 4, 2017	#LaLunaSangrePatunay		35.9%	1	2
13	Signos (Sign)	July 5, 2017	#LaLunaSangreSignos		34.0%	1	2
14	Moonchasers	July 6, 2017	#LaLunaSangreMoonchasers		33.0%	1	2
15	Peligro (Danger)	July 7, 2017	#LaLunaSangrePeligro		33.9%	1	2
16	Bagsik (Ferocity)	July 10, 2017	#LaLunaSangreBagsik	La Liga Unida clashes with Sandrino's legion of vampires and Malia gets a taste of Sandrino's wrath in a bloody encounter. As her powers start to manifest, she vows that she will fulfill the prophecy to avenge the death of her loved ones. Meanwhile, Tristan joins the Moonchasers in their investigation of DJ Lemuel Ruiz's passing. Veruska reveals to Sandrino that Malia did not inherit any of her parents’ powers. However, the Supremo refuses to be complacent and instead commands his legion of vampires to continue to find the chosen one. Then in the middle of the night, the Moonchasers get summoned to a meeting by Professor Theodore Montemayor.	36.2%	1	2
17	Misyon (Mission)	July 11, 2017	#LaLunaSangreMisyon		35.2%	1	2
18	Paghahanap (Search)	July 12, 2017	#LaLunaSangrePaghahanap		34.7%	1	2
19	Prof T (Professor Theodore)	July 13, 2017	#LaLunaSangreProfT		35.1%	1	2
20	Miyo	July 14, 2017	#LaLunaSangreMiyo		33.3%	1	2
21	Unang Misyon (First Mission)	July 17, 2017	#LaLunaSangreUnangMisyon	Sandrino orders his subordinate to search for Malia's childhood friends. Malia expresses her gratitude to Kuto's family for accepting her. Tristan comes across Malia again after Kuto stole his wallet. While inside a pit, Malia and Tristan hold hands without causing an electric reaction. Elsewhere, a captured werewolf reveals to Sandrino information about Malia that he needs the most. Prof. T equips the Moonchasers with specialized weapons for their mission at the DATU tournament. Meanwhile, Malia learns about Luningning's participation in the event and decides to meet her childhood friend in person. Malia goes to the competition, falling into Sandrino's trap. The Moonchasers face the vampires to protect Luningning, while Malia takes a step back to protect her friends. Chino informs Sandrino that a group of young mortals spoiled their plan to abduct Luningning. This is the first time Supremo is aware of human intervention, and realizes they are not Luna.	36.0%	1	2
22	Balatkayo (Disguise)	July 18, 2017	#LaLunaSangreBalatkayo		33.8%	1	2
23	Huli Ka! (Got You!)	July 19, 2017	#LaLunaSangreHuliKa		36.0%	1	2
24	Unahan (Forward)	July 20, 2017	#LaLunaSangreUnahan		33.6%	1	2
25	Bagong Kagat (New Bite)	July 21, 2017	#LaLunaSangreBagongKagat		35.8%	1	2
26	Hinala (Suspicion)	July 24, 2017	#LaLunaSangreHinala	Ningning is devastated to witness Nognog succumb to the vampire bite. The Moonchasers watch Nognog as he slowly transitions into a vampire. Failing to kill him, Nognog is abducted by Supremo's vampires. Meanwhile, Malia reunites with Baristo, Catleya, and Gael. The remaining members of the La Liga Unida carefully discuss their plan against the Supremo. Lemuel begins his new life as a vampire under the guidance of Gael. This also puts Lemuel in close proximity to Tristan, who spots the vampire near his home. Tristan panics in fear for his family's safety. Betty also finds Tristan's weapon among his belongings. Meanwhile, Sandrino leads a rite of passage for Nognog. The coven of vampires then discuss about the humans’ hindering Sandrino's political ambitions. Jethro, meanwhile, realizes something about his prophecy. Malia finds a way to infiltrate the SMV Corporation. During her investigation, she is able to fish for information about its mysterious CEO.	34.2%	1	2
27	Magandang Balita (Good News)	July 25, 2017	#LaLunaSangreMagandangBalita		35.1%	1	2
28	Pag-asa (Hope)	July 26, 2017	#LaLunaSangrePagasa		35.1%	1	2
29	Misteryo (Mystery)	July 27, 2017	#LaLunaSangreMisteryo		35.9%	1	2
30	SMV Corp (Samahang Mga Vampire Corporation)	July 28, 2017	#LaLunaSangreSMVCorp		33.9%	1	2
31	Gigil (Unexpected)	July 31, 2017	#LaLunaSangreGigil	Miyo gets an unexpected close encounter with Sandrino. Miyo resolves to get closer to the Supremo after failing to garner enough information about him. Meanwhile, Baristo finds a new hideout for his pack. Elsewhere, Luningning receives a generous offer from Youtopia.	35.6%	1	2
La Luna Sangre is the 2nd most watched program in July 2017 with 34.8% average rating.

==== August 2017 ====
Episode		Original Air Date	Social Media hashtag	Synopsis	Kantar Media Nationwide		
Episode		Original Air Date	Social Media hashtag	Synopsis	Rating	Timeslot rank	Primetime rank
32	Pugad (Lair)	August 1, 2017	#LaLunaSangrePugad	Prof. T wants to teach Tristan a valuable lesson, Prof. T shows the young man that winning the war within us is more important than winning any kind of battle. Malia then seeks Erin's help with finding Omar, Noah's old friend who is connected to Supremo. Prof. T, on the other hand, orients the Moonchasers about the vampires’ new target. Later, an unwelcome visitor appears on Dory's doorstep. Supremo puts on an act to earn the public's trust. After learning about Erin's failed attempt to convince Omar to join their forces, Malia decides to do it herself. With Gael's help, Malia gears up for her meeting with the former Luna member. Though aware that Omar's loyalty is suspect from the beginning. Prof T. allows Tristan to join the rest of the Moonchasers on their mission. Meanwhile, Malia gains access to Omar's gambling den. She goes toe-to-toe with him and quickly catches his attention with her skills.	34.2%	1	2
33	Linlang (Trickery)	August 2, 2017	#LaLunaSangreLinlang		33.7%	1	2
34	Patibong (Trap)	August 3, 2017	#LaLunaSangrePatibong		35.7%	1	2
35	Sugal (Gamble)	August 4, 2017	#LaLunaSangreSugal		35.3%	1	2
36	Bitag (Trap)	August 7, 2017	#LaLunaSangreBitag	The Moonchasers continue with their mission to look out for Sen. Mallari. Unbeknownst to them, a group of vampires is keeping tabs on their movements. Meanwhile. Omar takes Malia to Sandrino's lair. There, she witnesses the viciousness of Supremo and his coven. Meanwhile, Sen. Mallari reveals the existence of Supremo to the Moonchasers. Fearing for her life, one of the Moonchasers' members decides to leave the group. Unknown to her, a more dangerous threat outside their mission awaits. The Moonchasers have a bloody encounter with Sandrino's group. Amid the battle, the vampires gain ground as several young fighters get fatally injured while trying to protect Sen. Mallari. Meanwhile, Gilbert reaches out to the poor in hopes of winning their votes in the upcoming elections. After watching a news report about the young volunteers killed during Sen. Mallari's provincial visit, Malia's group identifies a potential ally. Elsewhere, Sandrino visits Sen. Mallari, which led to tragic consequences. After studying the sequence of events, Malia realizes that there is a spy within the vampires' ranks. Back at his hideout, Supremo comes to the same conclusion and tasks Therine to unearth the traitor. Meanwhile, Tristan escapes the Moonchasers’ headquarters to check on his family. While there, he bumps into Miyo who finds out about his injuries.	35.4%	1	2
37	Tapang (Courage)	August 8, 2017	#LaLunaSangreTapang		34.1%	1	2
38	Sugod (Dash)	August 9, 2017	#LaLunaSangreSugod		35.8%	1	2
39	Sugatan (Injury)	August 10, 2017	#LaLunaSangreSugatan		35.2%	1	2
40	Agos ng Dugo (Blood Flow)	August 11, 2017	#LaLunaSangreAgosNgDugo		34.0%	1	2
41	New Prophecy (Bagong Propesiya)	August 14, 2017	#LaLunaSangreNewProphecy	Jethro prophesies again about Malia and Tristan's physical contact. Though alarmed by Jethro's vision, Sandrino works on ensnaring the traitor in his rank. Meanwhile, Malia wonders about the strange connection between her and Tristan. Omar gives Malia a job that will bring her closer to Supremo. Meanwhile, Prof. T keeps Tristan from joining the Moonchasers’ new mission. Elsewhere, Supremo gets closer to finding out who the traitor is. After obtaining information about the vampires’ new target, Tristan decides to take on the Moonchasers’ new mission by himself. He then warns Serafin about the threat to the latter's life, unaware that he is giving away the identity of his group's informant to Sandrino. Meanwhile, Miyo learns about Sen. Paglinauan's meeting with Supremo. Miyo remains determined to attend the convention. Soon, Miyo comes up with a plan. Malia prevents Jake from joining her in her mission. However, she soon finds herself in the company of someone she least expects, Tristan. Meanwhile, Prof. T gets instruction from the head of Moonchasers to abort their mission. Unaware of their canceled operation, Tristan goes to the convention alone. While waiting to meet with Gilbert, Serafin passes time by making advances at Malia. After confirming that the mission has been aborted, Tristan decides to leave. However, he is soon attacked by a group of vampires. Luckily, his backup arrives in the form of Prof. T. Escaping from Serafin, Malia bumps into Tristan and she accidentally calls him by his name. Eventually, the two escape from their pursuers.	33.7%	1	2
42	Spark (Tilamsik)	August 15, 2017	#LaLunaSangreSpark		32.7%	1	2
43	Informant	August 16, 2017	#LaLunaSangreInformant		33.3%	1	2
44	She is Back! (Bumalik Siya!)	August 17, 2017	#LaLunaSangreSheIsBack		35.1%	1	2
45	Back Up	August 18, 2017	#LaLunaSangreBackUp		32.5%	1	2
46	San Isidro	August 21, 2017	#LaLunaSangreSanIsidro	Malia manages to convince Tristan to let her tag along. After a long trip, she finds herself in a familiar place. Unknown to Tristan and Malia, Sandrino traces their whereabouts. Wanting to discover what Tristan is really up to, Malia thinks of ways to extend their stay. Meanwhile, following Omar's advice, Sandrino begins to eliminate all the tainted allies in his lair. Meanwhile, the real traitor learns about Sandrino's increased efforts to eliminate those who are a threat to his plans. Alarmed, the mole in Supremo's coven immediately relays this discovery to the head of Moonchasers. In hopes of avoiding suspicion, the said informer later tells Sandrino of Nognog's plan to help Jethro and Veruska. Furious, Supremo summons all his underlings and gives them a taste of his wrath. Meanwhile, Lemuel thinks of a way to finally meet the Moonchasers. Elsewhere, Chino is dead set in finding Tristan and fulfilling his promise to Sandrino. After a long chase, Chino finally manages to corner Tristan. He leads a group of vampires in a fierce attack against the teen. During the assault, Malia is forced to reveal her fighting skills. Meanwhile, Nognog tries to trick Supremo into letting him leave their hideout. Aware of Nognog's plan, Supremo makes use of the traitor to sniff out the Moonchasers.	33.4%	1	3
47	Foul Play	August 22, 2017	#LaLunaSangreFoulPlay		33.5%	1	3
48	Traitor	August 23, 2017	#LaLunaSangreTraitor		31.1%	1	3
49	Past to Present	August 24, 2017	#LaLunaSangrePastToPresent		32.2%	1	3
50	Chase	August 25, 2017	#LaLunaSangreChase		32.9%	1	3
51	Lady in White	August 28, 2017	#LaLunaSangreLadyInWhite	The Moonchasers clash with the vampires and unexpectedly receive aid from a lady in white. When this reaches Sandrino's knowledge, he appoints a new right-hand man to strengthen his supremacy. Despite hearing the Moonchasers’ story about the vampire who helped them, Tristan remains convinced that good vampires do not exist. When he discovers that the head of Moonchasers is actually a vampire, Tristan feels betrayed. Elsewhere, Samantha brushes off Prof. T's suggestion that they join forces with La Liga Unida. Wanting to vent his frustration over the fact that a vampire is leading Moonchasers, Tristan asks Toni for a meetup. Elsewhere, Samantha pleads with Star to help her predict the future. To fish out more information about Samantha, La Liga Unida then sends out Jake to join her organization. Meanwhile, Tristan gathers some of his trusted friends and tells them of his plan to form a new group. Sandrino, likewise, thinks of a way to reinvent his campaign strategy and boost his popularity to the masses.	32.6%	1	2
52	He Knows	August 29, 2017	#LaLunaSangreHeKnows		33.6%	1	3
53	Diskarte (Strategy)	August 30, 2017	#LaLunaSangreDiskarte		32.1%	1	3
54	New Plan (Bagong Plano)	August 31, 2017	#LaLunaSangreNewPlan		33.6%	1	2
La Luna Sangre is the 3rd most watched program in August 2017 with 33.7% average rating.

==== September 2017 ====
Episode		Original Air Date	Social Media hashtag	Synopsis	Kantar Media Nationwide		
Episode		Original Air Date	Social Media hashtag	Synopsis	Rating	Timeslot rank	Primetime rank
55	Exposed	September 1, 2017	#LaLunaSangreExposed	Elsewhere, Miyo finds herself in trouble while accomplishing an illicit task from Manuel. Meanwhile, Tristan encourages his allies to keep a close eye on the Moonchasers’ actions. Afterward, he and Piolo track down Toni in hopes of getting more information about the vampires. Elsewhere, Erin makes contact with Prof. T.	32.0%	1	2
56	Explosion	September 4, 2017	#LaLunaSangreExplosion	Samantha then reveals her identity to the cynical Moonchaser. Meanwhile, Miyo discloses evidence to the members of La Liga Unida proving Sen. Paglinauan's illegal dealings. Later, Miyo is caught off guard by an explosion which imperils the lives of his loved ones. Elsewhere, Gilbert resolves to finally meet with Jacintha Magsaysay. After learning that Miyo got his hands on evidence that will expose his illegal dealings, Sen. Paglinauan takes action to prevent it from happening. He tells Supremo about Miyo's betrayal and enlists the latter's help with capturing his bodyguard. Under hypnotic control, a group of police officers arrest Miyo and force him to admit to a crime. When he refuses to follow their orders, Miyo is forced to endure grueling torture at their hands. Miyo finds himself begging for his life as Sen. Paglinauan orders his henchmen to murder the young man. While Baristo continues his search for Malia, Omar sets up a fight with La Liga Unida to secretly send his message to its leader. Elsewhere, Sandrino finally meets the powerful political strategist, Jacintha Magsaysay. The arrival of Jacintha stuns Gilbert as the former reminds the latter of someone from the past. The presidential hopeful furtively scrutinizes Jacintha in an attempt to validate his suspicion. Elsewhere, Malia's life lies in jeopardy as she finds herself at the mercy of Sen. Paglinauan's henchmen. In her most desperate moment, Malia draws strength from her parents to get through her ordeal. At Dory's wake, Madam Star is caught off guard at the sight of Tristan. Under Gilbert's spell, Jacintha accedes to his demand to return to the Philippines with him. Back at Supremo's den, Nognog enacts his plan of helping Veruska and Jethro escape. Nognog sacrifices his life, but Jethro and Veruska escape successfully. Miyo miraculously survives a fatal attack from Sen. Paglinauan's henchmen. After that the policemen died after killing Miyo	33.5%	1	3
57	Torture	September 5, 2017	#LaLunaSangreTorture		33.4%	1	2
58	The Coming	September 6, 2017	#LaLunaSangreTheComing		35.1%	1	2
59	Magbangis (Wild)	September 7, 2017	#LaLunaSangreMagbangis		36.2%	1	2
60	Omen	September 8, 2017	#LaLunaSangreOmen		35.5%	1	2
61	Search	September 11, 2017	#LaLunaSangreSearch	La Liga Unida divides its members into two groups to broaden their search for Malia. Tristan, on the other hand, persuades the police chief to investigate Sen. Paglinauan's involvement in Miyo's disappearance. Suspecting that Lia is playing games with him, Supremo plans to keep up with her schemes. Meanwhile, Jacintha begins her job as Gilbert Imperial's political consultant. A worried Tristan persistently searches for Miyo. Meanwhile, Samantha urges Madam Star to contact Jethro. After receiving Madam Star's telepathic message, Jethro makes his way to meet the fortune teller. Elsewhere, Gilbert comes up with a plan to uncover Jacintha's true identity. A mystical phenomenon happens to Malia. Thinking that Miyo is dead, Tristan mourns for his friend's 'death' and relays the sad news to Berto and Baristo. Determined to bring Sen. Paglinauan to justice, Tristan vows to expose the senator's illegal dealings. Meanwhile, Supremo fails to prove his hunch that Jacintha has superpowers. Samantha, on the other hand, becomes concerned upon hearing Jethro's bloody premonition. Malia stuns La Liga Unida with her return. Along with her unexpected survival comes the news of her recently discovered self-healing ability. At the hospital, Jacintha gets a visit from Gilbert, who continues to find clues that would link her to Lia. Meanwhile, Tristan becomes even more determined to expose Sen. Paglinauan's illegal doings in order to avenge Miyo's fate. Not long after, Zeny holds a press conference and publicly announces the corrupt senator's involvement in various illegal businesses. Meanwhile, Omar makes a difficult decision for the sake of his wife. Later, Jethro pieces together his past premonitions about Tristan.	34.9%	1	3
62	Evolution	September 12, 2017	#LaLunaSangreEvolution		34.5%	1	3
63	Resurrection	September 13, 2017	#LaLunaSangreResurrection		36.3%	1	2
64	Signs	September 14, 2017	#LaLunaSangreSigns		36.2%	1	2
65	Decoy	September 15, 2017	#LaLunaSangreDecoy		36.4%	1	2
66	Bagong Kasapi (New Member)	September 18, 2017	#LaLunaSangreBagongKasapi	Omar succeeds in bringing Catleya to Supremo's lair. The young werewolf undergoes torture in the hands of the powerful vampire. Later, Gilbert compels Jacintha to watch a video of Catleya's suffering in an attempt to confirm his hunch that the strategist will recognize a La Liga Unida member. Meanwhile, Sen. Paglinauan remains unfazed despite Zeny Mallari's admonitions. Elsewhere, Tristan learns the truth about Gilbert Imperial. Toni expresses her interest to join Moonchasers in order to protect Tristan. However, upon meeting Prof T., Toni gets attacked by Samantha — much to her and Tristan's surprise. Meanwhile, Jacintha confronts Gilbert if he has feelings for her. Resolved not to be romantically connected to Gilbert, Jacintha forbids the former from falling in love with her. After his release, Sen. Paglinauan goes to Berto's place and expresses false sympathy for the Lumakads' loss. He later tells this to Supremo, who, in turn, becomes eager to learn more about Tristan's allies. Meanwhile, a group of werewolves joins forces with La Liga Unida in order to save Catleya. Though aware that Supremo is using Catleya as bait, Baristo and Malia are determined to risk losing their lives for Catleya's sake. Jacintha resolves to know more about Gilbert as she asks him to go on an out-of-town trip with her. Following Supremo's instruction, Duke and the other vampires soon attack Tristan. Aware of the danger surrounding Tristan, Jake and his fellow Moonchasers rush to Tristan's aid. Meanwhile, La Liga Unida carefully maps out a game plan on how to save Catleya. La Liga Unida invades Supremo's den, however, fall for a trap set by Supremo's forces. On the brink of a massacre, Malia and the rest of La Liga Unida get unexpected help from an unknown savior, a lady vampire in white singlehandedly destroyed many of the attacking vampires in the lair. Tristan becomes unaware that the head of Moonchasers, Samantha, has been seeking Madam Star's help in knowing more about his identity.	36.0%	1	2
67	Face Off	September 19, 2017	#LaLunaSangreFaceOff		36.8%	1	2
68	Game Plan	September 20, 2017	#LaLunaSangreGamePlan		34.2%	1	3
69	Save Catleya	September 21, 2017	#LaLunaSangreSaveCatleya		35.7%	1	2
70	Rescue Ops	September 22, 2017	#LaLunaSangreRescueOps		36.4%	1	2
71	The Offer	September 25, 2017	#LaLunaSangreTheOffer	To avert the prophecy, the powerful vampire forewarns the young man of his imminent death and offers him a way to live again. La Liga Unida decides to send the fatally wounded Catleya out of the country so she can receive proper treatment. Meanwhile, Gilbert rebukes Jacintha for making him wait. He later attempts to prove his hunch that she is the mysterious lady who came to La Liga Unida's rescue. Tristan hears a voice of an unknown man while trying to remember a forgotten part of his past. Meanwhile, La Liga Unida puts Malia's skills to the test in order to see the extent of her abilities. As her self-healing power manifests amid attacks from werewolves and vampires, Malia resolves to change the prophecy. Elsewhere, Omar's group abducts Tristan. Upon learning that he is Supremo's target, Tristan concocts a dangerous plan against the cursed vampire's forces. Though aware that it might put the young Toralba's life in peril, Prof. T agrees with the idea and urges the other Moonchasers to help Tristan carry out his scheme. Meanwhile, Madam Star learns an appalling revelation from Betty, which validates her premonitions about Tristan. Worried about her nephew, Betty soon confronts the young man about his job and possible connection to vampires. Elsewhere, an enraged Gilbert reveals his true form to Jacintha. Despite learning of his mother's tragic fate and Madam Star's terrifying premonition about him, Tristan remains determined to protect his family against Supremo's forces. Meanwhile, Tristan prepares his group for an undercover mission to steal confidential files from Sen. Paglinauan's office. During their mission, however, Tristan discovers that the senator is holding Apple captive. Elsewhere, thinking that the lady in red is Jacintha in disguise, Gilbert decides to stay away from his most unpredictable adversary.	34.5%	1	2
72	Experiment	September 26, 2017	#LaLunaSangreExperiment		35.9%	1	2
73	Ang Luna	September 27, 2017	#LaLunaSangreAngLuna		34.1%	1	2
74	Deception	September 28, 2017	#LaLunaSangreDeception		33.8%	1	2
75	Undercover	September 29, 2017	#LaLunaSangreUndercover		35.5%	1	2
La Luna Sangre is the 2nd most watched program in September 2017 with 35.2% average rating.

==== October 2017 ====
Episode			Original Air Date	Social Media hashtag	Synopsis	Kantar Media Nationwide		
Episode			Original Air Date	Social Media hashtag	Synopsis	Rating	Timeslot rank	Primetime rank
76	Setup		October 2, 2017	#LaLunaSangreSetup	Wanting to clear off any obstacle in his ambition to rule the world, Gilbert orders Sen. Paglinauan to kill Tristan. With this, the politician manages to get his hands on the lad. Malia and La Liga Unida, on the other hand, worry over Tristan's safety after losing their connection with him. La Liga Unida then attempts to save the young man from the unscrupulous politician. Elsewhere, Jacintha gets a surprise visit from her parents. Malia is relieved upon learning that Tristan is safe. She then learns from the lad that he and his fellow Moonchasers set up Sen. Paglinauan. Worried that the politician might eventually find out about the Moonchasers' mission, Malia and Jake talk to the security guard who had seen the assault against Tristan. Sen. Paglinauan, on the other hand, orders his henchmen to kill the security guard. Meanwhile, Jacintha is determined to learn more about Gilbert's past. Malia and Tristan watch over the security guard and his family in order to protect them against Sen. Paglinauan. After an encounter with the politician's henchmen, Tristan and Malia make a confession to each other. Prof. T, meanwhile, confirms his hunch about Jake's identity. Samantha meets up with Jethro and asks him to contact Barang. Elsewhere, Jacintha discovers thantruth about Gilbert's past. The Moonchasers discuss among themselves how they will carry out their new mission of ruining Gilbert's campaign for the presidency. In order to take a breather from their mission, Tristan asks Toni out on a date. Meanwhile, Gilbert learns that Jacintha is not the lady in red who has been contradicting his plans. He convinces his former political strategist to work for him again. Elsewhere, Samantha and Jethro finally come across Barang, Magnus’ loyal vampire seer. During their date, Tristan and Toni vow to stay committed to their cause. Unfortunately, their supposedly romantic night suddenly turns bittersweet. Meanwhile, Samantha confronts Sandrino to find answers to the questions that have been haunting her. Sandrino, however, reveals a shocking truth to her. He is her half brother. La Liga Unida and Moonchasers finally unite.	36.5%	1	2
77	The Return		October 3, 2017	#LaLunaSangreTheReturn		36.2%	1	2
78	Kasangga (Partner)		October 4, 2017	#LaLunaSangreKasangga		33.5%	1	3
79	Date		October 5, 2017	#LaLunaSangreDate		34.1%	1	3
80	Sanib Pwersa (Joined Force)		October 6, 2017	#LaLunaSangreSanibPwersa		33.8%	1	2
81	Secret		October 9, 2017	#LaLunaSangreSecret	After learning that Samantha got out of Sandrino's lair unscathed, Baristo and Jethro begin to be suspicious of her motives. Meanwhile, Malia notices that Tristan is distancing himself from her. Disappointed and regretful over what happened the night before, she then opens up to Jake. Toni tries to reach out to Tristan, but the latter only rebuffs her. Later on, Tristan and Prof T try to convince Sen. Paglinauan to go against Supremo. Meanwhile, Gilbert is impressed with Morris' project proposal that would be beneficial to the vampires. In order to cool things down, Gilbert brings Jacintha to somewhere special. There, the two have a deep conversation about love – and how it could help Gilbert win the elections. Meanwhile, Malia starts finding out more about Samantha. Later, Tristan's uneasiness about Toni intensifies when he learns that the latter is hiding something from him. Elsewhere, Samantha gives Sandrino a piece of her mind on how he could go about with his ambition. Mrs. Mallari's shocking claim against Sen. Paglinauan causes Jacintha to suspect that Gilbert might be involved in the politician's illegal activities. Because of this, Supremo threatens to kill Sen. Paglinauan. Meanwhile, Samantha tries to get to know Supremo better in order to use something against him. Later, upon learning about Prof. T's decision to join forces with La Liga Unida, Samantha tries to prevent the said group from working with the Moonchasers. Elsewhere, Tristan learns the real score between Toni and Jake. Days before their mission, Toni and Tristan inform Prof T that Sen. Paglinauan heeded to their request to expose Gilbert's connection to his own illegal activities. However, the Moonchasers’ mentor makes a decision that enrages Tristan. Aware of the death threats against him, Sen. Paglinauan goes face-to-face with Sandrino. The leader of the vampire then gives a stern warning to the senator. Elsewhere, Samantha explains to La Liga Unida why it is not yet the right moment to face Supremo.	33.6%	1	4
82	Kakampi (Ally)		October 10, 2017	#LaLunaSangreKakampi		33.0%	1	4
83	Mga Tanong (Questions)		October 11, 2017	#LaLunaSangreMgaTanong		31.5%	1	4
84	Ebidensya (Evidence)		October 12, 2017	#LaLunaSangreEbidensya		31.3%	1	4
85	Traydor (Traitor)		October 13, 2017	#LaLunaSangreTraydor		30.4%	1	3
86	Ang Tigil-Pintig Week	Under Attack	October 16, 2017	#LLSUnderAttack	Toni ensures that the senator will carry out what is expected of him. But things did not turn out as planned. Gilbert orchestrated a nationwide communications shutdown which interrupted the video feed that would expose the senator's corruption and Gilbert's collusion. Instead, as Gilbert announces his intention to run for the position of president of the Philippines, Sen. Paglinauan shoots Gilbert. After the bloody encounter at the political rally, Sen. Paglinauan and Gilbert are rushed to the hospital. While everyone is tending to a wounded Gilbert, the vampire suddenly realizes that his heart is beating again. Soon, Gilbert finds out that he might have a similar condition with someone he encountered in the past. Meanwhile, upon learning that Supremo is weak, Malia plans an attack on the vampire's lair.Taking advantage of Supremo's condition, La Liga Unida carries out its plan of storming his lair. Meanwhile, Gilbert receives a visit from Jacintha, who was surprised to hear about his unexpected recovery. Later, Gilbert learns from Barang the reason behind his weakness. Because of this, the vampire is resolved to stop his heart from beating. Savoring the chance they have been given with Sandrino's absence, Malia and the rest of La Liga Unida storm his lair. After the attack, the La Liga Unida proclaims a new leader. However, Veruska seems reluctant to accept this announcement. Elsewhere, Sandrino receives the news that La Liga Unida's attack has weakened his forces. Nevertheless, he remains undaunted and continues strengthening his forces.	33.8%	1	3
87	Ang Tigil-Pintig Week	Pintig (Pulse)	October 17, 2017	#LLSPintig		34.9%	1	3
88	Ang Tigil-Pintig Week	Tinamaan (Stricken)	October 18, 2017	#LLSTinamaan		31.5%	1	3
89	Ang Tigil-Pintig Week	Lusob (Raid)	October 19, 2017	#LLSLusob		32.9%	1	3
90	Ang Tigil-Pintig Week	Gantihan (Answer)	October 20, 2017	#LLSGantihan		29.8%	1	3
91	The Week To Die For	Pinuno (Leader)	October 23, 2017	#LLSPinuno	Supremo manages to reclaim his lair and captures Veruska. The vampire orders his underlings to find out more about La Liga Unida and Samantha's faction. Elsewhere, Morris and his cohorts plan to abduct Jacintha. While on their pursuit, he and his fellow vampires encounter a mysterious lady in red. Gilbert tries to win the sympathy of the public by revealing Sen. Paglinauan's illegal activities. Later, the vampire finds himself defending Jacintha against Barang's accusations. Elsewhere, Samantha and one of Gilbert's allies start plotting their next move against Sandrino. Meanwhile, Sandrino remains confident that Jacintha is not his enemy. However, Samantha goads her brother for being smitten with his political strategist. Barang then urges Sandrino to come to his senses. Elsewhere, someone close to Miyo is forced to join the dark side. Worried for their families' safety, the Moonchasers take their training to the next level with the help of La Liga Unida. Upon crossing paths with Ningning, Malia helps her friend recall a distant memory. After facing Barang, Samantha urges the former to stop Sandrino from executing his vile plans. Things take a turn for the worse during Gilbert's talk show guesting as Barang executes a wicked plan, hoping to expose her assumptions about Jacintha's identity. Barang, then, reveals to Gilbert why his campaign adviser wants to remain incognito. Determined to confirm Ningning's revelation about her late mother, Malia tries to go face-to-face with Jacintha. The Moonchasers, meanwhile, agree to test out Prof T's formulation that would temporarily protect them and their families against vampires.	34.1%	1	3
92	The Week To Die For	Bagong Laban (New Battles)	October 24, 2017	#LLSBagongLaban		34.1%	1	3
93	The Week To Die For	Tibok ng Puso (Heartbeat)	October 25, 2017	#LLSTibokNgPuso		32.2%	1	3
94	The Week To Die For	Mukha (Face)	October 26, 2017	#LLSMukha		33.2%	1	2
95	The Week To Die For	Virus	October 27, 2017	#LLSVirus		29.5%	1	3
96	Buwis-Buhay Week	Big Question	October 30, 2017	#LLSBigQuestion	Malia finally comes face to face with Jacintha. Even without proof, Malia is convinced that Gilbert's campaign adviser is her mother. Because of this encounter, La Liga Unida is determined to find out the truth about Jacintha's identity. Meanwhile, Barang is held captive after discovering something about Jacintha. Elsewhere, Greta is determined to avenge the deaths of her loved ones. Upon seeing Greta, Tristan suspects that his former neighbor is biting down a secret. Meanwhile, Samantha starts carrying out her mission against Barang. Barang, however, tries to turn the situation to her favor. Because of this, Barang finds herself in trouble after encountering the mysterious lady in red.	32.1%	1	3
97	Buwis-Buhay Week	Barang	October 31, 2017	#LLSBarang		33.1%	1	2
La Luna Sangre is the 3rd most watched program in October 2017 with 33.0% average rating.

==== November 2017 ====
Episode			Original Air Date	Social Media hashtag	Synopsis	Kantar Media Nationwide		
Episode			Original Air Date	Social Media hashtag	Synopsis	Rating	Timeslot rank	Primetime rank
98	Buwis-Buhay Week	Hanapan (Search)	November 1, 2017	#LLSHanapan	Meanwhile, a group of vampires invade the Toralbas' home. Elsewhere, Malia and La Liga Unida are determined to unmask Jacintha's true identity. Gilbert fumes in anger upon discovering the identity of the mysterious individual behind Barang's death. Tristan's paranoia over not experiencing the serum's effects made him resort to a half-baked decision. Soon, his peculiar state makes Samantha question his identity. Malia, meanwhile, fails to make Jacintha spill the beans about Gilbert. Nevertheless, she vows to stay in pursuit until the Night of Blood Moon comes.	32.0%	1	2
99	Buwis-Buhay Week	True Colors	November 2, 2017	#LLSTrueColors		33.3%	1	3
100	Buwis-Buhay Week	Flatline	November 3, 2017	#LLSFlatline		34.8%	1	2
101	Linggo Ng Sumpa	Vision	November 6, 2017	#LLSVision	After failing to convince Prof. T to join forces with La Liga Unida, Malia decides to quit Moonchasers. Elsewhere, La Liga Unida sets their plan to unveil Jacintha's true identity in motion. Sandrino, on the other hand, is determined to finish off the Lady in Red. Jacintha inherited Barang's insight when she killed her, and in a vision, discovers Barang's enchantment of the cursed ink. After news broke out about a trail of dead bodies that were found along a doll with red cape, La Liga Unida and the Moonchasers decide to do their respective investigations. Elsewhere, Sandrino reaches his boiling point as the lady in red continues to intervene with his plans. He then sets up a trap to find out her true identity. Jacintha embarks on a search for a book of spells which holds the key to defeating the Supremo. She asks permission from its mysterious owner. Worried for Samantha's safety, Theodore calls her, only to find out that Sandrino is on the other side of the line. Meanwhile, Malia and La Liga Unida meet with Jacintha's family. But instead of getting answers, the group is riddled with more questions. Later on, the Moonchasers prepare for Sandrino's next big event. The Moonchasers and La Liga Unida enact their plan to infiltrate and sabotage the Supremo's black party. Unknown to them, Sandrino has a few tricks up his sleeve. Soon, the two groups fight all odds to halt the Supremo's vile schemes. Meanwhile, back in the forest, Jacintha encounters a young Sandrino being chased by imps in the forest. Taking pity on the child, she offers to help him find his way home. The Moonchasers and La Liga Unida successfully thwart Supremo's vile scheme. While La Liga Unida manage to capture several vampires, the Moonchasers reclaim Samantha's body. Meanwhile, Tristan discovers Toni's superhuman abilities, causing him to doubt her true intentions.	34.4%	1	3
102	Linggo Ng Sumpa	End of Curse	November 7, 2017	#LLSEndOfCurse		36.0%	1	2
103	Linggo Ng Sumpa	Aftermath	November 8, 2017	#LLSAftermath		35.4%	1	2
104	Linggo Ng Sumpa	Black Party	November 9, 2017	#LLSBlackParty		33.3%	1	3
105	Linggo Ng Sumpa	Ganti (Revenge)	November 10, 2017	#LLSGanti		33.4%	1	2
106	Week Of The Marked	Hidden Agenda	November 13, 2017	#LLSHiddenAgenda	Malia finally comes clean to Tristan about her true identity. Her revelations, however, did not change Tristan's mind. Later on, Tristan and Malia each learn that Gilbert is conducting an outreach program in Pulang Lupa. While Tristan seeks reinforcement from Prof. T, Malia delegates the members of La Liga Unida to protect the innocent people against vampires. Sandrino, on the other hand, targets Tristan's loved ones. Gilbert pays Pulang Lupa a visit in the guise of a political campaign. Petrified, Tristan tries to hide and protect his family. However, his unsuspecting family welcomes and invites Gilbert to their home. Despite Toni's effort to make amends, Tristan chooses to remain distant with her. However, upon realizing his mistake, Tristan immediately swallows his pride and reaches out to Toni. Meanwhile, the Moonchasers enact a plan to protect Prof. T, Tristan, and the Toralbas from the Supremo. Elsewhere, La Liga Unida gains new members from unexpected people. Sandrino and his vampires easily overpower the Moonchasers. While several members are injured or killed, others are taken captive for vital information. On the other hand, Malia and La Liga Unida watch helplessly as the Supremo brutally attacks the Moonchasers. Elsewhere, Jacintha continues to wander the forest with the young Sandrino. The old man then reveals to Jacintha his condition for lending her his mystical book. Tristan's refusal to give in to Sandrino's demand leads to tragic consequences. Meanwhile, Malia is determined to save Tristan and the rest of the captured Moonchasers. Her decision, however, is called into question by the other members of La Liga Unida. Blaming herself for Tristan's capture, Malia makes a life-altering choice.	34.4%	1	3
107	Week Of The Marked	Bantaan (Threatened)	November 14, 2017	#LLSBantaan		33.1%	1	3
108	Week Of The Marked	When in Doubt	November 15, 2017	#LLSWhenInDoubt		34.7%	1	2
109	Week Of The Marked	Disaster	November 16, 2017	#LLSDisaster		34.7%	1	2
110	Week Of The Marked	Prisoners of War	November 17, 2017	#LLSPrisonersOfWar		34.4%	1	2
111	Linggo Ng Harapan	Mata sa Mata (Eye to Eye)	November 20, 2017	#LLSMataSaMata	Determined to obtain information about Tristan and the other imprisoned Moonchasers, Malia resorts to offer herself as bait to Greta. However, it is Greta who falls into Malia's trap. Tristan, meanwhile, offers a deal to the Supremo. Unknown to him, Sandrino sets one of his friends free with hidden motives in mind. Elsewhere, Jacintha confirms Samantha's death from Sandrino himself. Tristan continues to put on a brave face despite the Supremo's threats and intimidation. Just when hope seems futile for the captured Moonchasers, Tristan learns that Prof. T has decided to meet with the Supremo to rescue them. When Malia finds out about the professor's plan to meet with the king of vampires, the chosen one seizes the opportunity to assist the Moonchasers on their rescue mission. Elsewhere, the elder Torralbas speculate on Tristan's sudden absence. After Prof. T made up his mind to sacrifice his life in exchange for the captured Moonchasers, the lady in red arrives to delay his meeting with the Supremo. She offers him a new strategy on how to deal with Sandrino and his legion of vampires. John, meanwhile, finally reveals himself to Tristan to help him and his fellow captives escape from the Supremo. The new member of La Liga Unida then fulfills Malia's instruction. With Jacintha's aid, Prof. T and the Moonchasers execute their new plan in saving their captured members. Prof. T then prepares for his meeting with the Supremo, while the lady in red secretly leads an assault against the vampires. Meanwhile, after being freed by John, Tristan leads the fight against the Supremo's army. Malia and La Liga Unida then assist Tristan and the Moonchasers as they face Sandrino's minions. Sandrino unleashes his wrath on Tristan and Aife. Meanwhile, Malia blames herself for letting Tristan get captured again. Betty, upon learning of her nephew's situation, discloses Star's premonition to her parents. Pina and Gabriel, however, confess a more shocking secret about Tristan's true identity. Later, Prof. T, Malia, and the lady in red receive a challenge from the Supremo.	33.0%	1	3
112	Linggo Ng Harapan	Vengeance	November 21, 2017	#LLSVengeance		34.2%	1	3
113	Linggo Ng Harapan	Life Line	November 22, 2017	#LLSLifeLine		33.1%	1	2
114	Linggo Ng Harapan	Clash	November 23, 2017	#LLSClash		34.3%	1	2
115	Linggo Ng Harapan	Harapan (Face to Face)	November 24, 2017	#LLSHarapan		33.0%	1	2
116	Power Unlock Week	Power Up	November 27, 2017	#LLSPowerUp	Malia remains determined to save Tristan. She comes up with a plan to use Supremo's weakness to recover the captured Moonchaser. To stage Malia's new plan, Prof. T turns to Jacintha for help. Tristan, meanwhile, tries to lure Victor, a vampire into switching loyalties. Malia and Prof. T make a deal with the Supremo in order to free Tristan. Finding their proposal worthless, Sandrino responds with his own offer. Later, Prof. T finally introduces the true founder of the Moonchasers to La Liga Unida. Jacintha volunteers to help Malia bring out the full potential of her powers. To further show his ruthlessness, the Supremo tortures Tristan by leaving him locked up inside a casket. To demoralize the combined forces of the Moonchasers and La Liga Unida, the Supremo sends them a video of Tristan's torment. Amid this, the Supremo unveils his abominable secret weapon to deal with his enemies. Meanwhile, as he reads the mystical book thoroughly, Jethro learns about the true source of the cursed ink's power and the only weapon to defeat the Sumpang Tintâ. He embarks with Gael on a journey to know more about the first werewolf and obtain the weapon. Malia starts training under Jacintha to unlock the full potential of her powers. Jacintha then subjects Malia to a series of intense drills that would challenge the latter of her mission. Tristan hums a familiar childhood tune while struggling inside the casket, prompting the Supremo to remember his then pregnant stepmother. Later, the Supremo finally unleashes his abominable weapon to take on La Liga Unida.	31.4%	1	3
117	Power Unlock Week	Tough Vs Tougher	November 28, 2017	#LLSToughVsTougher		32.7%	1	3
118	Power Unlock Week	Monster Unleashed	November 29, 2017	#LLSMonsterUnleashed		33.3%	1	2
119	Power Unlock Week	Buried Alive	November 30, 2017	#LLSBuriedAlive		33.8%	1	2
La Luna Sangre is the 2nd most watched program in November 2017 with 33.8% average rating.

==== December 2017 ====
Episode			Original Air Date	Social Media hashtag	Synopsis	Kantar Media Nationwide		
Episode			Original Air Date	Social Media hashtag	Synopsis	Rating	Timeslot rank	Primetime rank
120	Power Unlock Week	Deadline	December 1, 2017	#LLSDeadline	Malia races against time to save Tristan from the Supremo. However, she fails to unleash the full potential of her powers when she falls into Jacintha's trap during their training. Despite Jacintha's warnings, Malia continues to draw strength from her loved ones. Jacintha, on the other hand, silently vows to help Malia fulfill her duty as the New Chosen One. Later, Ningning helps Malia and the Moonchasers track down Tristan's location.	34.0%	1	2
121	Change Is Here	Change Begins	December 4, 2017	#LLSChangeBegins	Through Ningning's help, the group is able to discover his exact location. Sandrino's devious plot, however, awaits the unsuspecting Moonchasers. Meanwhile, Jacintha witnesses Malia unleash her power. After decoding Ningning's cryptic message, Malia informs Prof. T of Tristan's real location. Prof T. immediately retreats upon realizing it was a trap. Soon, Malia uses her power to save Tristan. Supremo, however, corners the two on their way out. Later, a stunning turn of events catches Supremo off guard. He sees Tristan's arm glowing with the same mark in his arm. Meanwhile, Gael and Jethro arrive at a mysterious house where the weapon that will kill Supremo is reportedly located. Supremo's underlings, on the other hand, enact their plan to get information about Tristan. Soon, Jacintha continues her mission to help Malia bring down Supremo. Tristan vows to fight alongside Malia. Jacintha and Prof. T decide to hide Tristan and his family to ensure their safety. Later, Tristan comes across Supremo. The powerful vampire then shocks Tristan with a big revelation. Meanwhile, Gael and Jethro find themselves at the mercy of Mr. X. Tristan is taken aback to learn his connection to Supremo. Through the help of Jan-Jan, Gael and Jethro safely return to La Liga Unida's headquarters with the fang of the first werewolf in their hands. Later, an unexpected turn of events stuns Malia and Tristan. Unknown to them, Jethro sees another horrible premonition. Soon, a big revelation catches Malia off guard.	33.9%	1	2
122	Change Is Here	It Is Time	December 5, 2017	#LLSItIsTime		38.5%	1	2
123	Change Is Here	No Time Left	December 6, 2017	#LLSNoTimeLeft		35.1%	1	2
124	Change Is Here	Kadugo Kita	December 7, 2017	#LLSKadugoKita		35.4%	1	2
125	Change Is Here	Blood Ties	December 8, 2017	#LLSBloodTies		33.6%	1	2
126	Fight Or Flight Week	True Story	December 11, 2017	#LLSTrueStory	Malia finds herself in a tough spot upon learning about Jethro's prophecy. Despite this, the chosen one is still determined to protect the man she loves. Sandrino, on the other hand, tries to get on the good side of his brother's family. Tristan receives information about his parents through Erin's help. The facts, however, lead him to a shocking confirmation about his real father's identity. Meanwhile, Jacintha tests Sandrino's emotions to learn how to make Supremo's heart beat. Later, the Moonchasers piece together the clues that point to Tristan's fate. Elsewhere, Jake is stunned after capturing a raging monster, his mother turned into a Hybrid. Jacintha and Malia reach the old hermit's enchanted place who grants their request with visions of the future. Both are stunned with the abomination wrought by Tristan. Meanwhile, Erin expresses his concern over his allies' safety after learning that Tristan had the cursed ink running in his veins. Prof. T, on the other hand, assures Tristan of his support in preventing the prophecy's fulfillment. Jacintha urges Malia to do the right decision as the chosen one after the old hermit gave them visions of the future. Meanwhile, Sandrino enacts his plan to manipulate Tristan and elicit his emotions to start his heart beating. The powerful vampire steps up his efforts to gain Tristan's trust and accept his fate. Malia is torn between her love for Tristan and the fulfillment of the prophecy. Thinking that Malia cannot fulfill the prophecy, Erin is determined to kill Tristan. He seizes Tristan but Malia intervenes. Meanwhile, Jacintha fights against time to protect Tristan by taking advantage of Sandrino's trust. As a result of aerin's mutiny, Baristo expels Erin and the rebel Lunas from LLU.	32.2%	1	2
127	Fight Or Flight Week	Hard Truth	December 12, 2017	#LLSHardTruth		31.1%	1	3
128	Fight Or Flight Week	Visions	December 13, 2017	#LLSVisions		31.9%	1	3
129	Fight Or Flight Week	Torn	December 14, 2017	#LLSTorn		31.0%	1	3
130	Fight Or Flight Week	Time Bomb	December 15, 2017	#LLSTimeBomb		30.3%	1	3
131	The Blood Hunt	The Hunting	December 18, 2017	#LLSTheHunting	Wanting to ensure that the prophecy will not take place, Jacintha urges Prof. T to find Tristan and Malia before Sandrino could get to them. Meanwhile, the rebel Lunas set out to hunt Tristan and Malia down. Elsewhere, Sandrino cooks up a plan on how to locate Tristan. Worried about Sandrino's underhanded schemes, Jacintha prepares herself to outmaneuver him out of getting Tristan first. Meanwhile, Jake reveals Veruska to the rest of La Liga Unida. Elsewhere, Tristan gives Malia a romantic respite from everything. Prof. T fights Erin to protect Tristan. While Tristan sleeps, Malia meets with Sandrino. In a stunning face off Sandrino realizes Malia's gaining strength and escapes before she hurts him. Malia becomes confident of her ability to defeat him. Afterwards, Malia admits to Tristan the truth about what she and Jacintha witnessed in the future. The revelation pushes Tristan to kill Sandrino himself. He resolves to use his sibling relationship to get close to Sandrino and get his heart beating so that Malia can kill him. He is ready to sacrifice his life for the sake of his allies. Meanwhile, Jacintha successfully gains Gilbert's trust, but an unexpected turn of events thwarts her mission against the powerful vampire. After Sandrino discovered Jacintha's hybrid nature, he wastes no time in looking for evidence to confirm her real identity. Though worried about Tristan's decision to put his life on the line, Malia and Prof. T prepare the Moonchasers to provide back up for Tristan's mission to gain Sandrino's trust. The ruthless vampire, however, senses yet another deception.	32.3%	1	3
132	The Blood Hunt	Coming	December 19, 2017	#LLSComing		30.4%	1	3
133	The Blood Hunt	Blood Hunt	December 20, 2017	#LLSBloodHunt		30.0%	1	2
134	The Blood Hunt	Blood Curse	December 21, 2017	#LLSBloodCurse		31.2%	1	3
135	The Blood Hunt	Bad Blood	December 22, 2017	#LLSBadBlood		29.9%	1	3
136	Ang Linggo Ng Pagkabuhay	Tough Love	December 25, 2017	#LLSToughLove	Jacintha secretly collaborates with the Lunas to prevent Sandrino from turning Tristan into a vampire. Soon, the Lunas successfully infiltrate the Supremo's lair. Erin and the other Lunas, however, find themselves in a life-threatening situation. Meanwhile, Apple meets a mysterious young man. Malia convinces Jacintha to trust her and Tristan's mission in bringing Sandrino down. Tristan, on the other hand, doubles his efforts to make Sandrino believe his allegiance to him. The powerful vampire, however, resolves to put Tristan to the test before enacting his grand plan. Meanwhile, Jethro makes a new discovery about the prophecy. Tristan's plan is slowly coming into fruition after Sandrino decided to release the Lunas. Despite making headway, Tristan still wants to make sure that Sandrino will completely fall into his trap. Meanwhile, Prof. T makes a shocking discovery about Jacintha as Veruska's condition gets worse. Tristan brings Sandrino to San Isidro as he continues with his mission to win the latter's heart. There, Tristan opens up about how Tonio died in the hands of the vampires. Sandrino, however, catches him off guard with appalling revelations. After revealing his involvement in Tonio's death, Sandrino uses this moment to gain Tristan's trust through stories about the Rica and Sandrino's past. The powerful vampire, however, is affected by his memories and his heart begins to beat. Back at the base, Jake arrives at an important decision involving Veruska.	27.0%	1	3
137	Ang Linggo Ng Pagkabuhay	Allegiance	December 26, 2017	#LLSAllegiance		30.9%	1	2
138	Ang Linggo Ng Pagkabuhay	Friend Or Foe	December 27, 2017	#LLSFriendOrFoe		29.8%	1	3
139	Ang Linggo Ng Pagkabuhay	Poison	December 28, 2017	#LLSPoison		32.1%	1	2
140	Ang Linggo Ng Pagkabuhay	Ang Pagkabuhay	December 29, 2017	#LLSAngPagkabuhay		31.6%	1	2

=== 2018 ===
==== January 2018 ====
Episode			Original Air Date	Social Media hashtag	Synopsis	Kantar Media Nationwide		
Episode			Original Air Date	Social Media hashtag	Synopsis	Rating	Timeslot rank	Primetime rank
141	Week Of The Wicked	Wicked	January 1, 2018	#LLSWicked	Tristan manages to make Sandrino's heart beat again. Sandrino, however, learns of his brother's betrayal. Later, the Supremo finds out from one of his captives that the prophecy has changed. He then becomes determined to get back at Tristan. Meanwhile, Jacintha concocts a plan to lure Gilbert out of hiding. La Liga Unida is all set to hunt down Sandrino. Sandrino, on the other hand, confronts Jacintha over the phone, unaware that she is tracking his location. Malia and her followers then head to Supremo's whereabouts. Their group, however, comes across a fallen Luna member. Despite the ongoing war with the Supremo and his forces, La Liga Unida members and the Moonchasers still find a way to celebrate Christmas. Meanwhile, Doc and Betty prepare for their upcoming wedding. Unknown to them, their preparation reaches Sandrino. The powerful vampire then plots another scheme in order to get a hold of his brother. To ensure Tristan's safety, the Moonchasers escort him to Doc and Betty's wedding. The vampires, however, manage to reach San Ildefonso by tailing Doc's friends. Upon learning of the vampires' impending attack, La Liga Unida members head immediately to the special event. Meanwhile, Doc and Betty finally tie the knot. Unknown to them, danger is just looming around the corner. While Tristan is being escorted back to safety, Malia faces Sandrino and engages in a combat with him. Tristan, on the other hand, laments over Betty's unforeseen passing. Soon, Betty is sent to her final resting place. Meanwhile, La Liga Unida gets information about Sandrino's whereabouts from one of his underlings. Elsewhere, Jacintha prepares to fight against the Supremo.	27.5%	1	3
142	Week Of The Wicked	Identity	January 2, 2018	#LLSIdentity		29.7%	1	3
143	Week Of The Wicked	Target	January 3, 2018	#LLSTarget		29.8%	1	3
144	Week Of The Wicked	A Wedding And A Goodbye	January 4, 2018	#LLSAWeddingAndAGoodbye		29.1%	1	3
145	Week Of The Wicked	The Wake	January 5, 2018	#LLSTheWake		30.0%	1	3
146	Ang Simula Ng Katapusan	Blood Moon Rising	January 8, 2018	#LLSBloodMoonRising	Tristan leaves the safe house for the columbarium where Betty's ashes are interred. There, Tristan vows to put an end to the war in order to spare the lives of the innocent people. Upon finding Tristan, Jacintha urges him to leave immediately but to no avail. Malia arrives at the columbarium shortly, and the three come face to face with Sandrino. Determined to put an end to the war, Jacintha battles it out with Sandrino. As Malia tries to bring Tristan to safety, the blood moon suddenly rises, causing the cursed ink to appear on the young Toralba. Seeing that Sandrino is overpowering Jacintha, Malia takes charge and duels with the powerful vampire instead. However, Sandrino manages to take advantage of Jacintha's situation and carries out his plan against his brother. Taking matters into her own hands, Jacintha decides Tristan's fate. She also plunges the First Werewolf's fang into Sandrino's beating heart, and sees him turn to ashes. After fulfilling her mission, Jacintha suddenly dissolves into nothingness. Meanwhile, La Liga Unida and the Moonchasers overpower the vampires. However, their victory comes with a hefty price as many Moonchasers gave up their lives. Soon, Malia and the Toralbas mourn Tristan's passing. Elsewhere, Sandrino is alive. Stripped off the power and protection of the Cursed Ink, Sandrino is considerably weakened and his wounds heal slowly. He has two loyal vampires who remain by his side and he vows to bring his brother back to life. He begins chanting the curse. Meanwhile, Prof. T and the Moonchasers pay tribute to Tristan and the fallen members of their group. The Toralbas then decide to go back to the province and start anew. Meanwhile, Malia starts questioning her existence because of the outcome of her mission. After Tristan's demise, Malia and La Liga Unida start anew and face a new chapter of their lives. Years later, La Liga Unida, through a revived Waya Corporation, manages to acquire the top businesses in the land. Soon, Malia and La Liga Unida hold a board meeting to make sure that they are still aligned with their mission of helping and protecting the innocent. While the Toralbas are at peace living their lives in the province, Sandrino chants and waits, and Tristan's gravestone appears to be disturbed.	33.0%	1	2
147	Ang Simula Ng Katapusan	Gabi Ng La Luna Sangre	January 9, 2018	#GabiNgLaLunaSangre		31.7%	1	3
148	Ang Simula Ng Katapusan	Blood Bath	January 10, 2018	#LLSBloodBath		31.0%	1	3
149	Ang Simula Ng Katapusan	Life After Death	January 11, 2018	#LLSLifeAfterDeath		32.3%	1	3
150	Ang Simula Ng Katapusan	New Moon	January 12, 2018	#LLSNewMoon		31.7%	1	3
151	The Week Of The New Order	New Order	January 15, 2018	#LLSNewOrder	As the national elections take place, Zeny Mallari's decision of conceding to her political rival upsets the group. Soon, upon learning of the newly elected president's order, Malia deems it necessary for her group to take proper precautions first. Meanwhile, Osmundo Mercado divulges to the Supremo and Emperador his plan for the country that would benefit them. Later, Tristan recalls how he was brought back to life. Lucho then starts questioning Malia's worth as their leader. Tristan, on the other hand, starts recalling the bad things that happened to him in the past. Meanwhile, Supremo is determined to start enacting his wicked plans against his enemies. Later on, Malia encounters a mysterious masked man. Soon, an incident in Waya Corporation distresses La Liga Unida. Meanwhile, things are turning up roses for the Toralbas after receiving a trust fund. Elsewhere, Supremo is delighted to learn that everything is ready for the fundraising event that his new ally organized. Determined to find out if Osmundo is conniving with the vampires, Malia sneaks into the "Bite for a Cause" event. Her surveillance, however, is cut short when a commotion suddenly ensues. She is then saved by the mysterious masked man she had encountered previously, confirming her intuition about him. Elsewhere, Prof. T receives a surprise visit from one of his former students. Tristan pays an unexpected visit to Prof. T and informs the latter of his plan to eliminate all werewolves and vampires. Seeing that Malia has been casting suspicion on the veracity of Tristan's demise, La Liga Unida, meanwhile, conducts a DNA test on her beloved's remains. Worried that Malia's intuition is true, Baristo and Jethro then try to gather new details about the prophecy. However, unknown to them, one of their supposed allies is updating Sandrino of their actions. Elsewhere, Lucho confronts Malia about Tristan.	29.4%	1	3
152	The Week Of The New Order	Imperator	January 16, 2018	#LaLunaSangreImperator		28.8%	1	3
153	The Week Of The New Order	Masked Man	January 17, 2018	#LLSMaskedMan		29.4%	1	3
154	The Week Of The New Order	Taken	January 18, 2018	#LLSTaken		31.8%	1	3
155	The Week Of The New Order	Proof Of Life	January 19, 2018	#LLSProofOfLife		28.7%	1	3
156	War Of The Worlds	Action Plan	January 22, 2018	#LLSActionPlan	In order to protect mankind, Prof. T concurs to Tristan's plan. Meanwhile, in her determination to find out the truth regarding Tristan, Malia pays the Toralbas a visit. Unknown to her, some La Liga Unida members are plotting to overthrow her from her position in Waya Corporation. Elsewhere, Osmundo relays to the Supremo and Emperador about the progress of the national ID system. With the help of his trusted underling, Sandrino gets his hands on the Book of Gaway. Malia, on the other hand, learns about a certain Jill Imperial, who is an up-and-coming business magnate. In order to find out more about him, Malia and La Liga Unida attend his launch party. Soraya shows a video of Malia to the members of La Liga Unida to prove that she is not fit to lead them anymore. Malia, on the other hand, gets the shock of her life as she finally encounters the Emperador. He then warns her to prepare for an impending war. Malia later relays this encounter to the council, only to be brushed off by some of them. Despite this, Baristo and a handful of followers assure Malia of their loyalty and support. Soraya and Geneva tries to convince the council to oust Malia as their leader. Malia, on the other hand, tries to get information about Tristan from his loved ones. Elsewhere, Sandrino is delighted to learn about the rift within La Liga Unida. The council reviews Soraya's suggestion to oust Malia as La Liga Unida's leader. Seeing that most of the members want Soraya to replace Malia, Baristo nominates another fitting candidate, Jake. With equal votes for both nominees, Gael suggests that the two undergo a duel instead. Meanwhile, Malia receives an unexpected visit from the Toralbas. Later, she and her loyal followers are alarmed to find that the Book of Gaway is missing.	30.4%	1	3
157	War Of The Worlds	Beauty In A Beast	January 23, 2018	#LLSBeautyInABeast		30.3%	1	3
158	War Of The Worlds	Love And War	January 24, 2018	#LLSLoveAndWar		30.0%	1	3
159	War Of The Worlds	Dethrone	January 25, 2018	#LLSDethrone		30.7%	1	3
160	War Of The Worlds	Duelo	January 26, 2018	#LLSDuelo		29.7%	1	3
161	In Love And In War Week	Versus	January 29, 2018	#LLSVersus	Soraya and Jake prepare for their combat. Malia, on the other hand, finds out that Sandrino is planning to attack. She immediately heads to the event and manages to save La Liga Unida just in time. Shocked to see Tristan alive and allied to Sandrino, the doubting werewolves apologize to Malia. Later, Lucho asks Malia an important question that could probably change her life. Malia and La Liga Unida pay respects to their fallen members. Later on, Waya Corporation faces a series of setbacks upon Gilbert Imperial's return. With the implementation of the national ID system, the government begins to hunt down many of the werewolves. Malia confronts Osmundo, hoping to save her fellow werewolves. After being arrested, she manages to save her kind from the president's men. Tristan then confronts Osmundo and convinces him to follow his orders. Sandrino, on the other hand, becomes puzzled over Tristan's unusual behavior.	32.4%	1	2
162	In Love And In War Week	The Fall Of Waya	January 30, 2018	#LLSTheFallOfWaya		32.4%	1	3
163	In Love And In War Week	Bleeding Moon	January 31, 2018	#LLSBleedingMoon		31.0%	1	3
La Luna Sangre is the 5th most watched program in January 2018 with 30.5% average rating.

==== February 2018 ====
Episode			Original Air Date	Social Media hashtag	Synopsis	Kantar Media Nationwide		
Episode			Original Air Date	Social Media hashtag	Synopsis	Rating	Timeslot rank	Primetime rank
164	In Love And In War Week	Blood Brothers	February 1, 2018	#LLSBloodBrothers	Soraya and her followers keep an eye on the Toralbas in hopes of using them against Tristan. While at it, Soraya is surprised to learn that Malia is still keeping in touch with Tristan's family. Meanwhile, emotions pour as the Toralbas get reunited with Tristan. Their reunion, however, turns bittersweet after they noticed the big change on the young lad. Lucho, on the other hand, encounters Sandrino after being summoned by the Book of Gaway. Aware of the vampire's desire to gain infinite power, Lucho capitalizes on Supremo's greed by telling him how to gain possession of the two cursed inks. At odds with Sandrino's plot, Tristan urges Prof. T to hasten their counterattack.	33.0%	1	2
165	In Love And In War Week	No Mercy	February 2, 2018	#LLSNoMercy		30.5%	1	3
166	Under Siege	Under Siege	February 5, 2018	#LLSUnderSiege	Determined to prevent the mass conversion from happening, Malia prepares La Liga Unida for a new mission. Jake gathers the werewolves for a series of intense physical training. Malia then turns to Prof. T for the immunity serum, unaware that the Moonchasers are also doing their part in protecting humans with Tristan's initiative. Elsewhere, Soraya resolves to take desperate measures to strengthen her force. Soraya manages to summon Sandrino and gives him a promising offer. Meanwhile, La Liga Unida and the Moonchasers join forces in protecting the delegates of the Heroes Ball. To ensure the success of their mission, Tristan keeps in touch with Prof. T. Upon realizing that the mortals are protected by an immunity serum, the vampires fail to push through with the mass conversion. However, an unexpected event occurs that favors Sandrino's thirsty underlings. Sandrino's underlings take advantage of the gatecrashers’ arrival to push through with the mass conversion. Unfortunately for them, La Liga Unida and the Moonchasers get in their way and join forces to secure the mortals’ safety. Much to the vampires’ relief, Tristan arrives and joins them in their battle against La Liga Unida. His next action, however, shocks the vampires and even Malia's allies. As he grows more doubtful of Tristan's loyalty, Sandrino resolves to make good use of his new ally. Soraya, incidentally, acquires vital information from La Liga Unida that would benefit the Supremo. Meanwhile, Malia remains puzzled over Tristan's real intentions. Later, Malia figures out Tristan's plan and issues a challenge to the Imperator. Suspicious of Soraya, Miriam decides to keep an eye on her and her group. This leads her to discover Soraya's connection with the vampires. Immediately after, Miriam relays the information to La Liga Unida. Sandrino, likewise, learns about Tristan's betrayal. Meanwhile, Jake finally confesses his true feelings for Malia. Later, Tristan appears before Malia and finally reveals his true intentions.	29.7%	1	3
167	Under Siege	Tick Tock	February 6, 2018	#LLSTickTock		31.2%	1	3
168	Under Siege	Double Cross	February 7, 2018	#LLSDoubleCross		31.9%	1	3
169	Under Siege	Blood Vs Blood	February 8, 2018	#LLSBloodVsBlood		31.4%	1	3
170	Under Siege	Betrayal	February 9, 2018	#LLSBetrayal		30.9%	1	3
171	The Apocalypse	Apocalypse Rising	February 12, 2018	#LLSApocalypseRising	Tristan, however, remains determined to get rid of all them for humanity's sake. Later, Malia learns about Soraya's treachery. Sandrino, likewise, discovers Tristan's plan to eradicate all the vampires and werewolves alike. Aware that he is currently no match for the Imperator, Sandrino plays innocent around Tristan while secretly plotting his revenge against his beloved brother. Prof. T is now one step closer to unlocking the formula that will eradicate all vampires and werewolves. Lemuel, on the other hand, finally comes up with a cure for vampirism. Malia resolves to relay this good news to Tristan, hoping that it will change the latter's mind. Apple, elsewhere, discovers the truth behind Collin's identity. Apple leaves the safety of her home to set up a reunion between Doc and his estranged family. Malia and La Liga Unida, on the other hand, are becoming more convinced that Soraya and her faction are betraying their own kind. Meanwhile, Prof. T tests out his formula on Greta. To be able to test the effectiveness of Prof. T's formula, the Moonchasers come to a difficult decision; they pick one of Malia's trusted allies and make him their new test subject. Malia, on the other hand, comes face-to-face with Soraya and vows to make her pay for her betrayal. Tristan tries to convince Prof. T to abandon their plan to eliminate all immortals, unaware that the Moonchasers have already started experimenting on Jake. Later, Tristan regains hope when his heart starts to beat again. Malia, however, fears that Tristan's recent development will become a disadvantage should he come face-to-face with Sandrino. Meanwhile, Soraya comes up with a plan to escape.	30.5%	1	3
172	The Apocalypse	Apocalypse Rage	February 13, 2018	#LLSApocalypseRage		30.5%	1	3
173	The Apocalypse	Apocalypse Danger	February 14, 2018	#LLSApocalypseDanger		29.7%	1	2
174	The Apocalypse	Apocalypse Warning	February 15, 2018	#LLSApocalypseWarning		33.5%	1	2
175	The Apocalypse	Apocalypse Dawns	February 16, 2018	#LLSApocalypseDawns		30.2%	1	3
176	The Apocalypse	Apocalypse Reigns	February 19, 2018	#LLSApocalypseReigns	Soraya and her faction take on their new mission and infiltrate the Moonchasers’ headquarters. To stay in Sandrino's good graces, they also volunteer to get rid of Lucho. However, the fruition of the black werewolves’ mission against the Moonchasers causes Prof. T to have a sudden change of heart. Despite Malia's warning, Tristan comes face-to-face with Sandrino to put an end to his brother's wickedness once and for all. Tristan comes face-to-face with Sandrino. After learning about Sandrino's plan against his own brother, Malia and La Liga Unida immediately come to Tristan's rescue. However, the Supremo manages to obtain the power of the two cursed inks, gaining himself an upper hand against Malia and Tristan. Disheartened, Malia comes to a difficult decision. Meanwhile, Prof. T vows to eliminate all immortals, regardless of their kind and intention. Upon obtaining the power of the two cursed inks, Supremo also manages to gain control of the government. Alarmed by these recent developments, Tristan presses Lucho into revealing the only key for him to defeat his evil brother. Malia, on the other hand, equips her allies for the night of the supermoon. Unbeknownst to her, Prof. T is cooking up a surprise for all vampires and werewolves. However, the members of La Liga Unida come together to acquire more power from the supermoon. Sandrino's underlings, likewise, gather to witness the phenomenal event. Prof. T, elsewhere, gears up for his ultimate revenge against the immortals. Malia and Tristan manage to stop Prof. T from executing his plan to eradicate all the immortals. Because of this, Sandrino is free to obtain more strength from the supermoon. Meanwhile, Malia and Tristan discover that the strange connection between them still exists. Tristan also discovers Lemuel's secret.	31.7%	1	3
177	The Apocalypse	Apocalypse Divides	February 20, 2018	#LLSApocalypseDivides		34.1%	1	2
178	The Apocalypse	Apocalypse Defies	February 21, 2018	#LLSApocalypseDefies		32.1%	1	2
179	The Apocalypse	Apocalypse is Here	February 22, 2018	#LLSApocalypseIsHere		32.5%	1	2
180	The Apocalypse	Apocalypse Now	February 23, 2018	#LLSApocalypseNow		30.6%	1	3
181	The Apocalypse	Last Straw	February 26, 2018	#LaLunaLastStraw	Evil has completely taken over Sandrino as he comes face-to-face with his other being. Malia and La Liga Unida, on the other hand, carry on their mission to protect and save the mortals from the wicked vampires. Unknown to them, Sandrino locates La Liga Unida's new hideout and scares the Toralbas out of their wits. La Liga Unida puts up a fight in an attempt to save the Torralbas at the hands of Supremo. However, their effort turns futile as Supremo not only managed to take Pina and Gabriel, but also end the life of Baristo. Refusing to let his adoptive father's sacrifice go to waste, Malia commands La Liga Unida to do whatever it takes to save Tristan's grandparents. However, Supremo makes sure that Tristan and Malia know that Gabriel and Pina are at his mercy. Eager to have Tristan join his cause, Supremo forces his brother to make a difficult decision. Sandrino's other being kills Gabriel and Pina after Tristan refused to kill Malia. Helpless, Tristan laments the deaths of his beloved grandparents. In a stunning turn of events, the emotional pain caused by the loss of her loved ones unleashes the full potential of Malia's powers and unveils the truth behind her identity. Meanwhile, Sandrino's followers start to turn their backs on him because of his mindless cruelty.	32.8%	1	3
182	The Apocalypse	Last Stand	February 27, 2018	#LaLunaLastStand		31.8%	1	3
183	The Apocalypse	Last Reveal	February 28, 2018	#LaLunaLastReveal		35.3%	1	2
La Luna Sangre is the 5th most watched program in February 2018 with 31.7% average rating.

==== March 2018 ====
Episode			Original Air Date	Social Media hashtag	Synopsis	Kantar Media Nationwide		
Episode			Original Air Date	Social Media hashtag	Synopsis	Rating	Timeslot rank	Primetime rank
184	The Apocalypse	Last Sacrifice	March 1, 2018	#LaLunaLastSacrifice	Jethro gets an alarming vision about the reoccurrence of La Luna Sangre. Tristan resolves to make the ultimate sacrifice: he decides to speak with Sandrino, hoping that there is still a chance for his brother to change. Malia, although initially against Tristan's plan, opts to accept and trust his decision. Tristan meets with the Supremo, in hopes of convincing his brother to stop his evil deeds. Their meeting, however, turns into an intense battle instead. Meanwhile, La Liga Unida discovers the Supremo's vile plan for humankind. Hand in hand, the vampires and the werewolves go the extra mile to protect the innocent mortals. Elsewhere, Malia comes to Tristan's rescue and finally rises up to meet her destiny.	33.7%	1	3
185	The Apocalypse	The Final Battle	March 2, 2018	#LaLunaTheFinalBattle		40.2%	1	2
La Luna Sangre is the 3rd most watched program in March 2018 with 37.2% average rating.
