= List of My Dear Heart episodes =

My Dear Heart is a 2017 Philippine fantasy drama television series directed by Jerome Pobocan and Jojo Saguin, starring Nayomi "Heart" Ramos, Coney Reyes, Zanjoe Marudo and Bela Padilla. The series premiered on ABS-CBN's Primetime Bida evening block and worldwide on The Filipino Channel on January 23, 2017 to June 16, 2017 replacing Till I Met You.

== Series overview ==
Season	Episodes	Originally released	
Season	Episodes	First released	Last released
1	103	January 23, 2017	June 16, 2017

== Episodes ==
No. overall	No. in season	Title	Original release date	Kantar Media Ratings (Nationwide)	AGB Nielsen Ratings (NUTAM)
1	1	"Ang Simula"	January 23, 2017	29.2%	21.3%
2	2	"Tatay Jude"	January 24, 2017	31.0%	18.6%
3	3	"Pamilya De Jesus"	January 25, 2017	27.6%	18.7%
4	4	"Laban, Heart"	January 26, 2017	28.9%	19.5%
5	5	"Happy Birthday, Heart!"	January 27, 2017	27.5%	18.3%
6	6	"Ang Pagkikita"	January 30, 2017	26.9%	18.9%
7	7	"Pray For Heart"	January 31, 2017	28.6%	18.9%
8	8	"Resulta"	February 1, 2017	28.7%	17.4%
9	9	"Koneksyon"	February 2, 2017	30.4%	20.6%
10	10	"Cross My Heart"	February 3, 2017	28.6%	19.0%
11	11	"Perya"	February 6, 2017	28.7%	18.5%
12	12	"Pakiusap"	February 7, 2017	28.5%	16.4%
13	13	"Kompetisyon"	February 8, 2017	27.9%	18.4%
14	14	"Headline"	February 9, 2017	25.5%	17.2%
15	15	"Pangako"	February 10, 2017	26.3%	17.3%
16	16	"Pagkabigo"	February 13, 2017	26.6%	17.5%
17	17	"I Miss You"	February 14, 2017	24.6%	16.4%
18	18	"Nandito Po Ako"	February 15, 2017	24.4%	15.9%
19	19	"Mensahe"	February 16, 2017	26.4%	17.3%
20	20	"Pag-Asa"	February 17, 2017	25.6%	17.0%
21	21	"Bingo"	February 20, 2017	25.8%	17.0%
22	22	"Scam"	February 21, 2017	25.0%	15.0%
23	23	"Ligtas"	February 22, 2017	28.4%	19.8%
24	24	"Ang Pagbabalik"	February 23, 2017	27.8%	20.3%
25	25	"Desisyon"	February 24, 2017	27.9%	17.4%
26	26	"Magkalaban"	February 27, 2017	29.1%	19.6%
27	27	"Anak"	February 28, 2017	30.5%	20.3%
28	28	"Selos"	March 1, 2017	27.8%	17.5%
29	29	"Harapan"	March 2, 2017	29.0%	20.5%
30	30	"Pangamba"	March 3, 2017	26.2%	17.7%
31	31	"Kapakanan"	March 6, 2017	28.2%	20.2%
32	32	"Misyon"	March 7, 2017	27.9%	20.0%
33	33	"Para sa Anak"	March 8, 2017	29.1%	20.0%
34	34	"Gising, Heart"	March 9, 2017	31.2%	21.9%
35	35	"Tuloy Ang Laban"	March 10, 2017	30.1%	20.0%
36	36	"Sikreto"	March 13, 2017	28.5%	TBA
37	37	"Bisto"	March 14, 2017	30.7%	TBA
38	38	"Magkasundo"	March 15, 2017	30.1%	TBA
39	39	"Hinala"	March 16, 2017	29.2%	TBA
40	40	"Guilty"	March 17, 2017	29.2%	TBA
41	41	"Impormasyon"	March 20, 2017	28.5%	TBA
42	42	"Bintang"	March 21, 2017	27.9%	TBA
43	43	"Panganib"	March 22, 2017	28.8%	TBA
44	44	"Dalaw"	March 23, 2017	28.2%	TBA
45	45	"Palaisipan"	March 24, 2017	29.6%	TBA
46	46	"Pagamin"	March 27, 2017	30.0%	10.7%
47	47	"Alaala"	March 28, 2017	27.7%	10.6%
48	48	"Yakap"	March 29, 2017	27.3%	10.0%
49	49	"Rebelasyon"	March 30, 2017	29.7%	11.5%
50	50	"Pangamba"	March 31, 2017	25.9%	10.8%
51	51	"Pagtataka"	April 3, 2017	26.5%	9.8%
52	52	"Katanungan"	April 4, 2017	28.5%	10.3%
53	53	"Ghost Hunters"	April 5, 2017	29.5%	10.0%
54	54	"Patibong"	April 6, 2017	29.3%	10.2%
55	55	"Kasagutan"	April 7, 2017	26.2%	9.2%
56	56	"Kapatid"	April 10, 2017	26.1%	9.8%
57	57	"Ebidensya"	April 11, 2017	26.1%	10.0%
58	58	"Kasunduan"	April 12, 2017	23.7%	8.8%
59	59	"Lihim"	April 17, 2017	25.7%	8.8%
60	60	"Konsensya"	April 18, 2017	27.8%	9.6%
61	61	"Nakaraan"	April 19, 2017	25.8%	9.7%
62	62	"Suspetsa"	April 20, 2017	26.1%	9.7%
63	63	"Ugnayan"	April 21, 2017	24.2%	8.7%
64	64	"Katotohanan"	April 24, 2017	25.2%	9.0%
65	65	"Welcome Home"	April 25, 2017	27.8%	9.7%
66	66	"Katibayan"	April 26, 2017	25.2%	9.6%
67	67	"Putol na Koneksyon"	April 27, 2017	25.3%	9.6%
68	68	"Karamay"	April 28, 2017	23.6%	8.9%
69	69	"Paghahanap"	May 1, 2017	24.6%	8.5%
70	70	"Suspek"	May 2, 2017	25.6%	9.6%
71	71	"Tiyaga"	May 3, 2017	21.8%	8.1%
72	72	"Peligro"	May 4, 2017	25.6%	9.4%
73	73	"Linlang"	May 5, 2017	25.1%	9.3%
74	74	"Ganti"	May 8, 2017	25.8%	9.6%
75	75	"Pagtatagpo"	May 9, 2017	26.0%	8.8%
76	76	"Kapalit"	May 10, 2017	26.0%	9.2%
77	77	"Malasakit"	May 11, 2017	28.1%	9.6%
78	78	"Bistado"	May 12, 2017	26.3%	8.7%
79	79	"Alas"	May 15, 2017	27.6%	10.1%
80	80	"Rebelasyon"	May 16, 2017	32.6%	10.3%
81	81	"Kadugo"	May 17, 2017	31.0%	10.0%
82	82	"Karapatan"	May 18, 2017	27.6%	10.0%
83	83	"Kalagayan"	May 19, 2017	24.2%	8.8%
84	84	"Lola Lucing"	May 22, 2017	27.3%	9.8%
85	85	"Pagkalinga"	May 23, 2017	32.1%	11.1%
86	86	"Manipula"	May 24, 2017	28.7%	10.4%
87	87	"Desperado"	May 25, 2017	27.0%	10.2%
88	88	"Kapit Lang"	May 26, 2017	26.9%	9.0%
89	89	"Salarin"	May 29, 2017	28.0%	9.4%
90	90	"Tensyon"	May 30, 2017	26.9%	9.5%
91	91	"Pursigido"	May 31, 2017	25.1%	9.1%
92	92	"Plano"	June 1, 2017	27.6%	10.7%
93	93	"Pagtuklas"	June 2, 2017	29.2%	9.5%
94	94	"Dakip"	June 5, 2017	30.4%	10.5%
95	95	"Dahilan"	June 6, 2017	27.5%	9.3%
96	96	"Katatagan"	June 7, 2017	24.6%	8.3%
97	97	"Sugod"	June 8, 2017	24.8%	8.1%
98	98	"White Light"	June 9, 2017	25.7%	8.9%
99	99	"Tibay ng Loob"	June 12, 2017	25.7%	9.2%
100	100	"Pagsundo"	June 13, 2017	26.3%	8.7%
101	101	"Bitag"	June 14, 2017	24.8%	8.5%
102	102	"Lola Doktora"	June 15, 2017	29.0%	9.8%
103	103	"The Last Heartbeat"	June 16, 2017	34.0%	11.6%
