= My Dear Heart =

2017 Philippine television drama series

- Title card
- Genre: Fantasy; Family drama; Comedy
- Created by: ABS-CBN Studios; Rondel P. Lindayag; Dindo Perez; Julie Anne R. Benitez
- Developed by: ABS-CBN Studios
- Written by: Shugo Praico; Danielle Joyce Factora
- Directed by: Jerome C. Pobocan; Jojo A. Saguin
- Starring: Nayomi "Heart" Ramos; Coney Reyes; Zanjoe Marudo; Bela Padilla; Ria Atayde
- Music by: Jessie Lasaten
- Opening theme: "Sa'yo Lamang" by Erik Santos
- Country of origin: Philippines
- Original languages: Filipino; English
- No. of episodes: 103 (list of episodes)

Production
- Executive producers: Carlo L. Katigbak; Cory V. Vidanes; Laurenti M. Dyogi; Roldeo T. Endrinal; Cathy Magdael-Abarrondo
- Producer: Carlina dela Merced
- Editors: Jay Mendoza; John Paul Ponce; Cary Steve Hen Ganado; Vincent San Antonio; Ceasara Terrado; Raymond Samaniego
- Running time: 28–46 minutes
- Production company: Dreamscape Entertainment Television

Original release
- Network: ABS-CBN
- Release: January 23 – June 16, 2017

My Dear Heart is a 2017 Philippine television drama series broadcast by ABS-CBN. Directed by Jerome C. Pobocan and Jojo A. Saguin, it stars Heart Ramos, Coney Reyes, Zanjoe Marudo, Bela Padilla and Ria Atayde. It aired on the network's Primetime Bida line up and worldwide on TFC from January 23 to June 16, 2017, replacing Till I Met You and was replaced by La Luna Sangre.

The series is streaming online on YouTube.

== Synopsis ==
The story revolves around Heart de Jesus (Nayomi Ramos), who grew up not knowing her biological parents because of her biological grandmother, and under the care of Jude (Zanjoe Marudo) and Clara de Jesus (Bela Padilla). She lives happily despite being poor and having a rare heart condition. Heart will then be put into a coma, which causes her soul to become visible to her doctor, Margaret Divinagracia (Coney Reyes). They then learn to love each other. Along the way, Heart will eventually know that Margaret is her grandmother, and Margaret's daughter Gia (Ria Atayde) is her birth mother. Jude will then discover that the little girl he is taking care of is the fruit of his affair with Gia.

== Cast and characters ==
=== Main cast ===
- Heart Ramos as Margaret Grace "Heart" L. de Jesus
- Coney Reyes as Dr. Margaret Divinagracia-Lana
- Zanjoe Marudo as Jude de Jesus
- Bela Padilla as Clara M. Estanislao-de Jesus
- Ria Atayde as Dr. Gia D. Lana

=== Supporting cast ===
- Robert Arevalo as Dr. Albertus Camillus
- Eric Quizon as Dr. Francis Camillus
- Joey Marquez as Kapitan Christopher "Tope" Estanislao
- Rio Locsin as Lucia "Lucing" Magdangal-Estanislao
- Susan Africa as Catherine "Cathy" Filomena
- Loisa Andalio as Agatha M. Estanislao
- Izzy Canillo as Goyong
- Johnny Revilla as Robert Cortesano
- Enzo Pelojero as Bingo
- Jameson Blake as Dr. Dominic Divinagracia
- Alicia Alonzo as Yaya Maria
- Mark Oblea as Vince
- Sandino Martin as Fr. Gabrielle "Gab" Magdangal
- Vic Robin III as Makoy
- Hyubs Azarcon as Bart Bernabe
- Jerry O'Hara as Lolo Rambo
- Rubi Rubi as Piling

=== Guest cast ===
- Kathleen Hermosa as Teresa
- Sue Ramirez as young Margaret
- Edu Manzano as Dr. Luke Divinagracia
- Jim Paredes as Martin Policarpio
- David Chua as Onse
- Niña Dolino as Nina Victorio
- Jao Mapa as Joseph De Jesus
- Guji Lorenzana as young Albertus
- Miko Raval
- John Manalo as young Jude
- Cessa Moncera as young Agatha
- Nhizky Calma as Victor
- Freddie Webb as Dr. Lana
- Tess Antonio as Mitring
- Vangie Labalan as Conching
- Rosario "Tart" Carlos as Nurse Alvarez
- Manuel Chua as Ghost-hunter
- JB Agustin as Anton
- Neil Coleta as Kevin Del Mundo

== Reception ==
Kantar Media National TV Ratings (8:30PM PST)
Pilot Episode	Finale Episode	Peak	Average
29.2% January 23, 2017	34% June 16, 2017	34% June 16, 2017	27.5%

== Remake ==
My Dear Heart was remade by Myanmar's partly state-owned broadcaster MRTV-4 as Chit Hla Swar Thaw (ချစ်လှစွာသော), which began airing on September 19, 2023. Despite the Philippine government's role in ABS-CBN's loss of its broadcasting franchise, Philippine Embassy in Yangon Chargé d’Affaires Enrique Voltaire Pingol attended the press launch of the adaptation and portrayed it as “part of people-to-people diplomacy and soft-power approach.”

== See also ==
- List of programs broadcast by ABS-CBN
- List of ABS-CBN Studios original drama series
