= The Sarah Balabagan Story =

- Theatrical flyer
- Directed by: Joel Lamangan
- Written by: Ricky Lee
- Produced by: William Leary
- Starring: Vina Morales
- Cinematography: Romy Vitug
- Edited by: Jess Navarro
- Music by: Vehnee Saturno
- Production company: Viva Films
- Distributed by: Viva Films
- Release date: October 15, 1997
- Running time: 120 minutes
- Country: Philippines
- Languages: Filipino; Arabic; English

The Sarah Balabagan Story is a 1997 Philippine biopic directed by Joel Lamangan. The film stars Vina Morales as Sarah Balabagan, an OFW who was sentenced to death in the United Arab Emirates for killing her employer who was attempting to rape her.

== Plot ==
Sarah Balabagan (Vina), a 14-year-old, goes to work as a maid in Al Ain, United Arab Emirates or "Saudi", then an umbrella term for countries in the Middle East among Overseas Filipino Workers.

Balabagan's recruiter lied about her age so she can work abroad. She only knew about this when she was already in Dubai. Balabagan receives unsolicited sexual advancements from her employer and his family. In one episode, she killed her employer who was attempting to rape her.

Balabagan was put on trial and was charged for manslaughter in a secular court, but the employer's family called for the death penalty on her. She was sentenced to death by an Islamic court. Her case became a publicized and the Philippine government attempted to save her from death row. Finally, her sentence was reduced to a year of imprisonment and 100 lashes following an appeal to the royal family.

== Cast ==
- Vina Morales as Sarah Balabagan
- Elizabeth Oropesa as Sarah's mother
- Robert Arevalo as Sarah's father - Kareem
- Chinggoy Alonzo as Ambassador Roy Señeres
- Tony Mabesa as Secretary of Foreign Affairs Domingo Siazon
- Menggie Cobarrubias as Atty. Didagen Dilangalen
- Rey Serrano as Mokammad
- Angel Baldomar as Ali
- Zandro Gatdula as Padua
- Jerome Reyes as Brando
- Irvin Era as Usman
- Marial Al-Mutawa as Samrah
- Teresa Loyzaga as Doctor
- Keempee de Leon as Ahmad
- Jennifer Sevilla as Mona
- Rolando Tinio as Sarah's grandfather
- Caridad Sanchez as Sarah's aunt
- Renato del Prado as Sarah's uncle
- Denise Borromeo as Bai
- Jim Pebanco as Mouraon
- Rita Avila as Amy
- Timmy Cruz as Mely
- Melissa Mendez as Helen
- Mina Bernales as Dina
- Eugene Domingo as Lucille
- Gloria Sevilla as Mommy Ines
- Cherry Pie Picache as Gina
- Pinky Amador as Carmi
- Tonia Dizon as Presentacion
- Ana Bautista as Rio
- Marie Barbacui as Maria
- Azmy Badwan as Almas Mohammed al-Baloushi

== Production ==
On September 13, 1996, Vic del Rosario Jr., Teresita Cruz and Vic Jose announced that Viva Films acquired the film rights to Sarah Balabagan's story. Balabagan was initially skeptical about turning her life into a film, but later on accepted the offer after consulting her advisers and realizing the positive reception gathered by The Flor Contemplacion Story. On October 21, 1996, Vina Morales was chosen to portray Balabagan in the film, as suggested by the latter.

== Release ==
The film's released was delayed for at least three times. It was slated to be part of the 1996 Metro Manila Film Festival, but did not make it to the cutoff. It was initially scheduled to be premiered on February 17, 1997, with the opening day to be held two days later but was delayed reportedly due to protests from the government of the United Arab Emirates.

The film's premiere was then rescheduled to March 6, 1997, but was postponed again due to protests from Muslim Screenwriters' Club who reportedly says that the film may potentially damage the public's views on the Muslim culture and traditions. Director Lamangan responded to the criticism that he was secure on the way on how he portrayed the story of Sarah Balabagan, the Middle East, and Islam and laments that Muslim critics of the film is barring a film they have never seen before. Balabagan herself together with Lamangan attended the March premiere which was cancelled in the last minute because the film didn't have a permit.

In mid-March, then-President Fidel V. Ramos postponed the showing of the film, saying it may damage the country's relationship with the UAE and it may jeopardize the efforts of the government to save another Overseas Filipino Worker, John Aquino who was sentenced to death in 1989. A retrial was called for Aquino in December 1996.

The film was finally released on October 15, 1997. Prior to that, Viva Films agreed with the government of the UAE to delete 22 scenes from the biopic in order for it to be released to theaters.

== Reception ==
Vina Morales received three Best Actress nominations for her role as Sarah Balabagan.

== See also ==
- List of films about Overseas Filipino Workers
