= Sarah Balabagan =

Filipino prisoner of the United Arab Emirates

- Born: March 8, 1979 (age 47); Maguindanao, Philippines
- Occupations: Overseas Filipino worker (c. 1993–1994), singer, entertainer
- Known for: United Arab Emirates criminal trial
- Criminal charge: Premeditated murder
- Criminal penalty: Death penalty, by firing squad (initial sentence); 1 year of imprisonment and 100 lashes
- Criminal status: Released (1996)
- Spouse: Jun Sereno
- Children: 5

Sarah Balabagan-Sereno (born March 8, 1979) is a Filipino former migrant worker and media personality who was imprisoned in the United Arab Emirates from 1994 to 1996 for murder. She was initially sentenced to death, but her sentence was later reduced to a year of imprisonment and she returned to the Philippines. Her story was made into a film in 1997.

== Early life ==
Balabagan grew up in a poor Muslim family in Sultan Kudarat, now part of Maguindanao del Norte in the Philippines. She had 13 brothers and sisters but only six survived. Her siblings died due to disease and because of her family's financial constraints, which prevented them from availing adequate medical care. She worked for relatives at a young age to support her studies. She only managed to reach the fifth grade. She has implied that she was abused by an uncle as a child.

== Employment ==
At age 14, Balabagan decided to work abroad. Her recruiter listed her age as 28 and managed to secure a job for her. She learnt of this falsification only when she was already on her flight to the United Arab Emirates. She was tasked by contract to work for a 67-year-old widower with four sons. Balabagan was anxious of the employment and convinced herself that her employers would respect her since she and they were Muslims.

This was later proven to be false, as Balabagan became a subject of unsolicited sexual advances.

== Case ==
On July 19, 1994, Balabagan killed her employer, Almas Mohammed al-Baloushi, stabbing him 34 times. She alleged that he had tried to rape her, and that she was acting in self-defense.

On June 26, 1995, a court ruled that she was guilty of manslaughter as well as a victim of rape. She was sentenced to seven years imprisonment and ordered to pay 150,000 dirhams (US$40,000) in blood money to al-Baloushi's relatives, while at the same time awarded 100,000 dirhams (US$27,000) as compensation for the rape. However, the prosecution appealed the verdict, calling for the death penalty. On September 6, 1995, a second Islamic court found no evidence of rape and convicted her of premeditated murder, sentencing her to death by firing squad. There was an international outcry and a defense campaign in several countries, as her case was seen as symbolising the ill-treatment of domestic servants in Arab states of the Persian Gulf, and just a few months earlier there had been the rather similar case of Flor Contemplación, a Filipina domestic worker who was hanged in Singapore that March.

Reportedly, it was only after a personal appeal for mercy by President of the United Arab Emirates Sheikh Zayed bin Sultan Al Nahyan that al-Baloushi's family agreed to drop their execution demand in exchange for blood money. On October 30, at her third trial, her sentence was reduced to a year's imprisonment and 100 strokes of the cane, along with payment of blood money, which was donated by a Filipino businessman. She was caned in 20 strokes at a time over five days spanning January 30 – February 5, 1996. Philippine Ambassador Roy Señeres said "Balabagan said it was bearable. Embassy officials visited her twice afterward, and there were no marks or bruises or reddening." However, she later said that her injuries were more serious than she said at the time. She returned to the Philippines on August 1, 1996, to a hero's welcome.

== Later life ==
Shortly after her release, Balabagan embarked on a career as a singer. In 1998, she became a single parent after a brief relationship. In August 2003, she married Russell Vergara and had two more children. She later converted from Islam to Christianity after being introduced to a pastor by a Christian singer, Dulce Amor. Balabagan and Vergara divorced in 2010.

In 2013, Balabagan married Jun Sereno, and they have a child. As of 2018, she lives in Las Vegas with her husband and five children.

In August 2020, Balabagan confirmed that the father of her first-born child is the journalist Arnold Clavio, who exclusively covered her murder case, and revealed that their relationship happened when she was 17 years old. She explained that her revelation was not out of vengeance, but to merely put an end to rumors. She also added that she apologized to "everyone she hurt", including her family and the family of Clavio, and that Clavio's wife has expressed forgiveness, via a messaging app.

== In film ==
Balabagan's story was dramatised in the 1997 Philippine film The Sarah Balabagan Story. Directed by Joel Lamangan, the Filipino language film starred Vina Morales in the title role, which was initially offered to Balabagan herself but had declined. The government of the Philippines made several attempts to prevent the film from being shown lest it damage bilateral relations with the United Arab Emirates, and its release was delayed for several months.

== See also ==
- Overseas Filipinos
- Philippines–United Arab Emirates relations
- Filipinos in the United Arab Emirates
- Flor Contemplacion
- Mary Jane Veloso
