= Jim Pebanco =

Filipino actor

- Born: Jaime Pebanco
- Occupation: Actor
- Years active: 1981–present

Jaime "Jim" Pebanco is a Filipino actor, known for Bulaklak ng Maynila (1999), Patikul (2011) and Hubog (2001). He was mostly seen in GMA Network and several shows in TV5 and ABS-CBN. He was also known in film such as for his role in Pacquiao: The Movie.

He portrayed different gay roles in film and television.

Joel Lamangan’s 3 decades partner is Pebanco since they met in the 1980s.

== Career ==
Pebanco started his career as a stage actor in 1981 when he first auditioned for the role of a chorus boy in Maynila, a musical staged at the Metropolitan Theater. He later played multiple roles in the Philam Life Theater musical Ready Na 'Ko, Direk!.

In 1992, Pebanco underwent a theater workshop in the summer under a scholarship with the Bulwagang Gantimpala of the Cultural Center of the Philippines. He also took part in plays organized by the Philippine Educational Theater Association. His first non-musical straight play was Sipnget with Bella Flores.

For his role in the film Patikul as the character Haddic, an illiterate Tausug whose son joined the militant group Abu Sayaf, he was given the Best Supporting Actor Balanghai award at the 7th Cinemalaya Philippine Independent Film Festival’s Directors Showcase Category in 2017.

== Filmography ==
=== Film ===
Year	Title	Role	Note(s)	Ref(s).
1991	Darna			
1994	Kadenang Bulaklak	Ruben Paez		
1995	Silakbo	Young executive		
1995	The Flor Contemplacion Story	Poe Gratela		
1996	Bakit May Kahapon Pa?	Karina's father		
1997	Milagros	Pilo		
1997	The Sarah Balabagan Story	Mouraon		
1998	José Rizal	Propagandist		
1999	Mister Mo, Lover Ko	Red		
2000	Abandonada	Jess		
2000	Deathrow	Lupe		
2001	Mila	Noli Malvar		
2002	Mano Po	Mike de la Madrid		
2003	Sukdulan	Carding		
2004	Aishite Imasu 1941: Mahal Kita	Edna		
2004	Mano Po III: My Love	Nememcio		
2006	Manay Po	Rouel		
2006	Pacquiao: The Movie	Bayani Ocampo		
2008	Manay Po 2: Overload	Rouel		
2008	Fuchsia	Poloy		
2011	Patikul	Hadic Abubakar	As "Jaime Pebanco"	
2018	Rainbow's Sunset	Benjamin Cruz		
2018	Isa Pang Bahaghari	Kapitan Larry		
2022	Mamasapano: Now It Can Be Told			
2023	Oras de Peligro	Cpl. Cardema		

=== Television ===
Year	Title	Role
1991	Maalaala Mo Kaya: Singsing Pangkasal	
1993	Noli Me Tangere	Bruno
2001	Maalaala Mo Kaya: Aling Mameng	
2002	Maalaala Mo Kaya: Gown	
2002	Kung Mawawala Ka	Emil
2005	Vietnam Rose	Armando Custodio
2007	Sine Novela: Pasan Ko ang Daigdig	Hernan
2008	Babangon Ako't Dudurugin Kita	Cesar Pesipcho
2008	Sine Novela: Una Kang Naging Akin	Anding
2008	Obra: Taong Grasa	
2009	Adik Sa'Yo	Roman
2009	Ikaw Sana	Jun
2010	Sine Novela: Basahang Ginto	Godofredo "Godo" Pandol
2010	Bantatay	Bruno
2011	Nita Negrita	Ben
2011	Pahiram ng Isang Ina	Karyo
2011	Enchanted Garden	Borago
2012	Valiente	Ariston Bugayon
2013	Madam Chairman	Sid Magbutay
2014	Magpakailanman: Girl Boy Bakla Tomboy - The Humawid Family Story	Kumpare
2014	Magpakailanman: Krimen sa Ngalan ng Puri	Attorney Garcia
2015	Magpakailanman: Sa Ngalan ng Anak - The Cerbito Family Story	Doctor
2016	Magpakailanman: Anak, Saan Kami Nagkamali?	Pilo
2016	Magpakailanman: Gay Organ Donor - The Genesis Laviana Story	Ber
2017	Imbestigador	
2017	Eat Bulaga! Lenten Special: Kaibigan	
2018	Pamilya Roces	Val
2023	Black Rider	Narding
2024	FPJ's Batang Quiapo	Young Celso
