= Pusong Mamon =

- Screenshot
- Directed by: Joel Lamangan; Enrico Quizon
- Written by: Ricardo Lee; Mel Mendoza-del Rosario
- Produced by: Vic del Rosario Jr.; Enrico Quizon
- Starring: Eric Quizon; Albert Martinez; Lorna Tolentino
- Cinematography: Romeo Vitug
- Edited by: Jess Navarro
- Music by: Dennis Garcia
- Production companies: Viva Films; Kaizz Ventures
- Distributed by: Viva Films
- Release date: April 5, 1998
- Running time: 120 minutes
- Country: Philippines
- Language: Filipino

Pusong Mamon (English Title: Soft Hearts) is a 1998 Philippine romantic comedy film directed by Joel Lamangan.

The film tells the story of Annie (Lorna Tolentino), who gets a few drinks into Ron (Albert Martinez), then has her way with him while he's drunk in his car. After learning she's pregnant, she moves in with him despite her discovery that he is gay and living with his boyfriend, Nick (Eric Quizon). Together, the trio navigates their way through a minefield of romantic difficulties while discovering the true meaning of love.

The film was rated PG-13 due to sexual elements, Eric Quizon who was one of the cast members confirmed in an interview that there will be a sequel, Pusong Mamon 2, to be seen in theaters in mid-2012 produced by VIVA Films after 16 years.

== Plot ==
At a company party, Annie tries to hit on Ron, but he brushes her off. Later that night, she follows him to his car where she makes a move on a drunk Ron, and they have sex.

A few days later, Annie finds out she's pregnant and confronts Ron in his office, demanding that he take responsibility for the pregnancy and marry her. Ron says he cannot marry her and admits that he already has a live-in partner. He then takes her to his house and introduces her to his boyfriend, Nick, which causes Annie to faint from shock at the revelation of his sexuality.

Annie reveals that she's pregnant with Ron's child, to Nick's disbelief. The two argue, with Nick concerned Ron might have to marry Annie. Ron suggests they should convince Annie to let them have the baby in exchange for money, but she disappears before they can talk to her.

The next morning, Annie blackmails the couple into letting her move in under the pretense that she and Ron will be live-in partners until she gives birth, after which they will get married. The couple discusses their situation over breakfast, where Nick surmises it might be convenient to go along with Annie's act to avoid suspicion from Ron's father, revealing that Ron is still in the closet. At the office, Annie has told the other employees that she and Ron are getting married.

During her stay with the couple, Annie repeatedly questions their sexuality, insisting she and Ron should get together instead. Nick and Annie also argue repeatedly over their differing preferences.

One night, Ron receives a surprise visit from his father, who is from the military and is homophobic. He spends the night at their house, forcing Nick to switch rooms with Annie to keep up the act. However, Ron reveals a secret door through the bathroom that connects their rooms, and they switch back again. Jealous and upset, Nick complains to Ron about Annie, and they make up and have sex, which Annie sees through the secret door, and she cries herself to sleep.

As Nick drives Annie to one of her checkup appointments, they confront each other about their situation, where Nick reaffirms his love for Ron, and the two finally begin to get along.

One day, one of the Nick and Ron's friends mentions the couple's desire to adopt Annie's baby, which they have not told her about yet. Feeling betrayed, Annie walks out. They chase after her, and Nick reassures her that they will not take her baby away from her, and they make up.

Annie finally gives birth, and Ron's Dad runs into Nick's grandmother, who knows about the two but is unaware of their ruse. The couple narrowly avoids being caught as they are called in by the nurse.

As Ron and Annie coparent their son, Ryan, at their house, Nick once again begins to feel left out, but Annie reassures him that he's also Ryan's parent, and the four start to live together as one family.

When Annie opens up to Nick about struggling to maintain the ruse to her family, he suggests that Annie find a man who will actually marry her. He gives her a makeover and set her up on dates, and she eventually gets together with Enrico.

One day, Sally, Annie's friend from the office, gives her a surprise visit at Ron and Nick's house and find the couple dancing with each other. Rumors of Ron's sexuality quickly spread among the employees.

At Ron's birthday party, Ron overhears his visitors gossiping about him. However, as he affirms the rumors to his boss, Mr. Menardo, he reassures him that he admires Ron's bravery. Encouraged by Mr. Menardo's words, Ron comes out during his birthday party. Albeit met with shock and disapproval at first, the visitors eventually applaud his revelation.

His father, who still disapproves of his sexuality, tells Ron that he should have told him earlier so that it could have been prevented, and Annie pulls him away towards the dance floor as she tells him that "there's more he needs to learn".

Annie eventually moves out of Ron and Nick's house, and she and Enrico get married.

== Cast ==
- Lorna Tolentino as Annie
- Eric Quizon as Nick
- Albert Martinez as Ron
- Eugene Domingo as Sally
- Caridad Sanchez as Nick's grandmother
- Jake Roxas as Reggie
- Tony Mabesa as Mr. Menardo
- Matthew Mendoza
