= List of films about Overseas Filipino Workers =

The following is a list of films featuring the plight of Overseas Filipino Workers (OFWs); Filipino migrants who temporarily resides and works in places outside the Philippines.

== List ==
Year	Title	OFW character(s) (Note: Main characters only)	Actor	Occupation (Note: Specific occupation of the main OFW character/s)	Country/territory (Note: Place of employment of the character/s)	Notes	Ref(s)
1995	The Flor Contemplacion Story	Flor Contemplacion	Nora Aunor	Domestic worker	Singapore	Biographical film	
1997	The Sarah Balabagan Story	Sarah Balabagan	Vina Morales	Domestic worker	United Arab Emirates	Biographical film about a worker who got convicted for killing her rapist employer and later had her sentenced reduced	
2004	Milan	Jenny	Claudine Barretto	—N/a	Italy	Works in Milan, to earn money for her family back in Metro Manila.	
2004	Milan	Lino	Piolo Pascual	—N/a	Italy	Came to Italy in search for his missing wife. He secures a job in Italy during his stay.	
2005	Dubai	Raffy	Aga Muhlach	Air freight employee	United Arab Emirates		
2007	Katas ng Saudi	Oca	Jinggoy Estrada	—N/a	Saudi Arabia	Much of the film revolves around Oca dealing with his family in the Philippines after working in Saudi Arabia for ten years.	
2016	Imagine You and Me	Graciana "Gara" Malinao	Maine Mendoza	Domestic worker	Italy		
2016	Sunday Beauty Queen	Themselves	Rudelie Acosta	Domestic workers	Hong Kong	Documentary film; focuses on the domestic workers' side exploits in beauty pageants.	
2016	Sunday Beauty Queen	Themselves	Cherrie Bretana	Domestic workers	Hong Kong	Documentary film; focuses on the domestic workers' side exploits in beauty pageants.	
2016	Sunday Beauty Queen	Themselves	Mylyn Jacobo	Domestic workers	Hong Kong	Documentary film; focuses on the domestic workers' side exploits in beauty pageants.	
2016	Sunday Beauty Queen	Themselves	Hazel Perdido	Domestic workers	Hong Kong	Documentary film; focuses on the domestic workers' side exploits in beauty pageants.	
2016	Sunday Beauty Queen	Themselves	Leo Selomenio	Domestic workers	Hong Kong	Documentary film; focuses on the domestic workers' side exploits in beauty pageants.	
2017	Kita Kita	Lea	Alessandra De Rossi	Tourist guide	Japan	A guide working in Hokkaido who went temporarily blind.	
2018	Still Human	Evelyn Santos	Crisel Consunji	Domestic worker	Hong Kong		
2018	Sid & Aya: Not a Love Story	Aya	Anne Curtis	Club entertainer	Japan	Aya entered illegally in Japan like to work as an entertainer like her mother	
2019	Hello, Love, Goodbye	Joy Marie Fabregas	Kathryn Bernardo	Domestic worker	Hong Kong		
2019	Hello, Love, Goodbye	Ethan Del Rosario	Alden Richards	Bartender	Hong Kong		
2022	Triangle of Sadness	Abigail	Dolly de Leon	Toilet manager of a luxury cruise	—N/a		
2024	Hello, Love, Again	Joy Marie Fabregas	Kathryn Bernardo	Registered Nurse	Canada		
2024	Hello, Love, Again	Ethan Del Rosario	Alden Richards	Barista, Caregiver and Pizza Delivery Guy	Canada		
