= Tony Mabesa =

Filipino actor and professor (1935–2019)

Tony Mabesa ONA
- Born: Antonio Ocampo Mabesa; January 27, 1935; Los Baños, Laguna, Philippine Islands
- Died: October 4, 2019 (aged 84); Manila, Philippines
- Resting place: Municipal Cemetery, Los Baños, Laguna
- Education: University of the Philippines Los Banos (BS); University of California, Los Angeles (MFA); University of Delaware (MS)
- Occupations: Stage director, actor, professor
- Awards: Order of National Artists of the Philippines

Antonio "Tony" Ocampo Mabesa ONA (January 27, 1935 – October 4, 2019) was a Filipino stage director, film and television actor, and professor. With a career spanning over 70 years, he was a founding father of Philippine university theater and one of the most prominent theater directors in the country. For his work, he was known as a "Lion of the Theater".

He founded the theater groups Dulaang UP and the UP Playwrights' Theatre.

== Early life and education ==
Antonio Ocampo Mabesa was born in Los Baños, Laguna. He entered high school at the University of the Philippines Rural High School, where he first directed a school production. He finished his degree in Agriculture at the University of the Philippines Los Baños, where he was mentored by Wilfrido Ma. Guerrero. He was a member of the Upsilon Sigma Phi.

He pursued a master's degree in theater arts at the University of California, Los Angeles (UCLA) in 1965, and a master's degree in education at the University of Delaware in 1969. He took further studies in dramatic literature at the University of Minnesota. While in the US, worked as a stage manager to Sir Tyrone Guthrie, where he "observed up close how a campus-based theater organization should be run and could work."

== Career ==
Upon his return from studies abroad, Mabesa was offered a teaching position at the UP Diliman's Department of Speech Communications and Theater Arts. As an educator, Mabesa pushed for the establishment of a Baccalaureate program devoted to Theater Arts, which began in 1978, and a Master of Arts in Theater Arts Program at the UP Diliman Campus.

He founded the theater groups Dulaang UP (DUP) in 1976, the UP Playwright's Theater in 1980, and later on founded the Angeles University Foundation Repertory Theater in 2005. In 1978, he served as Theater Director of the Manila Metropolitan Theater.

Over the course of his career, he directed and produced over 170 productions. He mentored some of the country's most prominent theater artists, such as Shamaine Centenera, Irma Adlawan, Nonie Buencamino, Eugene Domingo, Frances Makil-Ignacio, and Neil Ryan Sese.

== Death ==
Mabesa died on October 4, 2019, aged 84, in Manila.

== Filmography ==
=== Film ===
- Rosa Mistica (1988)
- Macho Dancer (1988) – Customer 1
- Tukso Layuan Mo Ako! (1991)
- Ipagpatawad Mo (1991) – EENT Doctor
- Sa Isang Sulok ng Mga Pangarap (1993)
- Kadenang Bulaklak (1994) – Mr. Benigno Doctolero
- Pangako ng Kahapon (1994) – Bishop
- The Maggie dela Riva Story: God... Why Me? (1994) – Appeal lawyer
- Iukit Mo sa Bala (1994) – Padre Celso
- Ang Ika-Labing Isang Utos: Mahalin Mo Asawa Mo (1994) – Priest
- Redeem Her Honor (1995) – Rosendo's lawyer
- The Flor Contemplacion Story (1995) – Foreign Affairs Sec. Roberto Romulo
- Closer to Home (1995) – Señor de Villa
- Muling Umawit ang Puso (1995) – Sen. Labrador
- Kristo (1996) – Caifás
- Bilang Na ang Araw Mo (1996) – Sen. Cepeda
- Bakit May Kahapon Pa? (1996) – Colonel Baluyot
- The Sarah Balabagan Story (1997) – Foreign Affairs Sec. Domingo Siazon
- José Rizal (1998) – Governor-General Camilo de Polavieja
- Katawan (1999) – Don Villaverde
- Mister Mo, Lover Ko (1999) – Priest
- Azucena (2000) – Tomas' boss
- Abandonada (2000) – Atty. Mallonca
- Deathrow (2000) – Governor Asunta
- Mila (2001) – Mr. De Castro
- Walang Kapalit (2003) – Mr. Cesar Rustia
- Filipinas (2003) – Father Manalo
- Aishite Imasu 1941: Mahal Kita (2004) – Mayor Aldecoa
- Pacquiao: The Movie (2006) – Ruben Novales
- Mano Po 5: Gua Ai Di (2006) – Ang Kong
- Ploning (2008) – Susing
- Fuchsia (2009) – Mayor Sunga
- Father Jejemon (2010) – Fr. Baby
- Niño (2011)
- Migrante (2012)
- The Mistress (2012) – Maestro Emil
- El Presidente (2012) – Gen. Echaluche
- Bayang Magiliw (2013)
- Lihis (2013)
- She's the One (2013)
- Bride for Rent (2014) – Mr. Benjamin
- Maybe This Time (2014) – Pancho
- Past Tense (2014) – Lolo Jules
- Felix Manalo (2015) – Pastor Guillermo Zarco
- Rainbow's Sunset (2018)
- Clarita (2019)

=== Television ===
Year	Title	Role
1988	A Dangerous Life	Ernesto Herrera
1993	Noli Me Tangere	Kap. Basilio
1993	Ipaglaban Mo!	
1995–97	Villa Quintana	Don Manolo Quintana
2002	Kung Mawawala Ka	Asturias
2005–06	Vietnam Rose	Fidel dela Cerna
2007	Sine Novela: Sinasamba Kita	Manolo
2007–08	Sine Novela: Pasan Ko ang Daigdig	Ben
2008	Sine Novela: Kaputol ng Isang Awit	Tatang Pastor
2008	Babangon Ako't Dudurugin Kita	Governor Fausto
2008	Sine Novela: Una Kang Naging Akin	Don Jaime Adriano
2009	Adik Sa'Yo	Samuel
2009–10	Ikaw Sana	Ramon Olivarez
2010	Sine Novela: Mars Ravelo's Basahang Ginto	Cecilo Cortez
2010–11	Inday Wanda	Guru
2011	Dwarfina	Nuno Umberto
2011	Pahiram ng Isang Ina	Atty. Carlos Guevarra
2012	Valiente	Victorino Penitente
2012–13	Enchanted Garden	Saulo
2013–14	Madam Chairman	Father Andy
2015	The Rich Man's Daughter	John "Angkong" Tanchingco
2018	Pamilya Roces	Manolo
2019	Hiram na Anak	Pedro (Last TV appearance)

- Villa Quintana (1995–1997)
- Vietnam Rose (2005)
- Pasan Ko ang Daigdig (2007)
- Babangon Ako't Dudurugin Kita (2008)
- Una Kang Naging Akin (2008)
- May Bukas Pa (2009)
- Basahang Ginto (2010)
- My Little Juan (2013)
- Maalaala Mo Kaya (2014)
- FPJ's Ang Probinsyano (2015)

== Awards and legacy ==
=== Awards ===
- Best Supporting Actor, 2018 Metro Manila Film Festival: Rainbow's Sunset (2018)
- Gawad CCP Para sa Sining awardee for Theater (2015)
- Upsilonian, Noble and Outstanding (UNO) Award
- Order of National Artists of the Philippines (2022)
