= Walang Kapalit (film) =

2003 drama film by Joel Lamangan

- Official movie poster
- Directed by: Joel Lamangan
- Written by: Raquel Villavicencio
- Produced by: Vincent del Rosario III; Veronique del Rosario-Corpus
- Starring: Sharon Cuneta; Richard Gomez
- Cinematography: Rolly Manuel
- Edited by: Tara Illenberger
- Music by: Von de Guzman
- Production company: Viva Films
- Distributed by: Viva Films
- Release date: 14 May 2003
- Running time: 108 minutes
- Country: Philippines
- Language: Filipino

Walang Kapalit (transl. irreplaceable) is a 2003 Philippine drama film directed by Joel Lamangan. The film stars Sharon Cuneta and Richard Gomez. It is named after Rey Valera's song from his 1981 album of the same title. It also marks the theatrical debut of Paolo Bediones.

The film is streaming online on YouTube.

== Plot ==
Joanne (Sharon Cuneta), an events organizer saw her estranged husband for 8 years Dennis (Richard Gomez) during an event and slapped him. Lara, who was their eldest daughter berates Joanne while trying to talk to her. Joanne and Dennis were college friends before. Joanne was the boyfriend of Dennis's best friend Noli while Celine was Dennis's girlfriend. On the night of Joanne and Noli's engagement party, Joanne learned that Noli has a son to another woman and broke up with him. The same thing happened to Celine and Dennis and both Dennis and Joanne told everything in a drunken frenzy until an unexpected thing happened. They had been married for 4 years when Dennis and Lara suddenly disappeared. Joanne now lives with her sick and slightly senile father Poppy (Dante Rivero) and son Stephen. As Joanne is trying to talk to Lara, she always fails, and she would blame Dennis for everything. With the help of Joanne's boyfriend Teddy (Paolo Bediones), she decided to have her marriage to Dennis annulled. When Dennis came to talk to Joanne, he was with Celine. He also said that he's now wanted to have an annulment and he had already filed it. Celine said that she and Dennis wanted to get married, but she waited for her divorce from her marriage to finalize so that they can be legally married. Dennis would later see Joanne with Stephen and Teddy. He would confront Joanne if he's the biological father. It turned out that when Dennis and Lara left Joanne, she was already pregnant. But Joanne insists that Stephen has no father, and asked if he's either Teddy's son or Noli's because Dennis heard that Joanne and Noli reconciled. In order to clear things up, Dennis asked Joanne to spend time with Dennis in order to prove that he's really the father. But Joanne refused because he deprived Lara for many years. So, Dennis set-up a deal, he would go out with Stephen while Joanne can take Lara out. So Dennis and Stephen spend their time in a tennis court while Lara and Joanne went to a mall. But, Lara suddenly disappeared, but upon reaching the administration office, Lara was seen in a cinema. She then told Dennis that Joanne abandoned her and went to a cinema. One day when Poppy suffered a heart attack in their house, Dennis came to rescue him. Joanne thanked Dennis for saving Poppy's life. When Joanne was about to leave for Hong Kong, Poppy suddenly harassed his private nurse, but Joanne and Dennis restrained Poppy and his private nurse forced to leave. Because there was no one to take care of Poppy, Dennis volunteered himself to take care of Poppy. He also asked that if he would once again spend as much time with Stephen as their first encounter was cut short, Joanne later approved and allowed Dennis to stay. He then brought Lara, but she wasn't recognized by Poppy. Lara and Stephen would later be close to each other as well as Poppy. When Poppy showed Lara a photo album, she saw some of the photos of her and Lara. She then confronted Dennis saying that she told her that Joanne left her when she was a kid. But Dennis insisted that Celine will be her new mother when they got married. But, Lara wants to be with her real mother, and that was Joanne. Before bedtime, Poppy gave Dennis Joanne's wedding ring, and died the following morning. Joanne and Lara reconciled, but Dennis asked Lara to leave. However, Lara asked if she would stay a longer and spend more quality time with Dennis. But, it's not his decision to stay, so she asked Joanne which she later approved.

As Joanne and Dennis are trying to rekindle their relationship, Teddy asked Joanne to marry him. But, Joanne insisted that she's still legally married to Dennis. So on Dennis's birthday, he set-up a date with Joanne. He also invited Celine and Teddy to celebrate with them. Teddy also told to Dennis and Celine that they are about to get married as soon as their marriage is annulled. He would asked Joanne on a date, but Dennis arrived and said that Celine is about to leave in the United States. So, he also asked Joanne for a dinner date. On the night of their date, Teddy arrived and said that they cannot have a date and that she also has a dinner date with Dennis.

== Cast ==
Main cast

- Sharon Cuneta as Joanne Rustia
- Richard Gomez as Dennis Rustia

Supporting cast

- Miriam Quiambao as Celine
- Paolo Bediones as Teddy
- Dante Rivero as Francisco "Poppy" Medina
- Charina Scott as Lara
- King Alcala as Stephen
- Bobby Andrews as Cid
- Pinky Amador as Tere
- Nanette Inventor as Mabel
- Tony Mabesa as Mr. Cesar Rustia
- Lui Manansala as Mrs. Mariquit Rustia
- Marc Nelson as Noli
- Dino Guevarra as Jake
- Marissa Delgado as Tita Auring
- Jim Pebanco as Dr. Tamayo
- Raquel Villavicencio as Attorney Seva
- Ku Aquino as Attorney Manican
- Nanding Josef as Fiscal
- Charlie Davao as Mr. Velasco
- Vanna Garcia as Kat Rustia
- Richard Nazareth as Richard Rustia
- Gilleth Sandico as Imee Lagdameo

== Production ==
Walang Kapalit, sung by Sharon Cuneta, was the theme song for the film. It was composed and originally sung by Rey Valera from his 1981 album of the same title.
