= Roy Señeres =

Filipino politician and diplomat

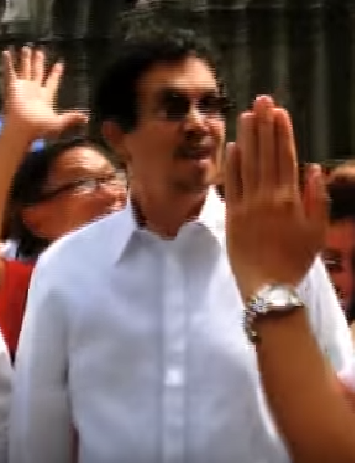
- Señeres in 2015

Member of the Philippine House of Representatives for OFW Family Club
- In office June 30, 2013 – February 8, 2016 Serving with Juan Johnny Revilla

Chairman of the National Labor Relations Commission
- In office 2002–2005
- President: Gloria Macapagal Arroyo

Philippine Ambassador to the United Arab Emirates
- In office 1994–1998
- President: Fidel V. Ramos

Personal details
- Born: Roy Villareal Señeres; July 6, 1944 Mambusao, Capiz, Philippines
- Died: February 8, 2016 (aged 71) Taguig, Metro Manila, Philippines
- Resting place: Manila Memorial Park – Sucat, Paranaque, Philippines
- Party: Labor
- Other political affiliations: OFW Family Club
- Spouse: Minerva Maaño
- Children: 6, Jay Thomas, Roy Jr, Christopher, Hazel, Hannah & Christian
- Education: University of Santo Tomas (BA); San Beda College (LL.B)
- Occupation: Politician
- Profession: Lawyer
- Website: royseneres.com

Roy Villareal Señeres (July 6, 1947 – February 8, 2016) was a Filipino politician and diplomat who initially ran in the 2016 Philippine presidential election under the Partido ng Manggagawa at Magsasaka party before withdrawing on February 5, 2016, three days before his death. Señeres was elected as a member of the Philippine House of Representatives representing the OFW Family Club party-list in the 2013 general elections. He is the father of former congressman Christian Señeres.

== Early life and education ==
Roy Señeres was born on July 6, 1947, in Mambusao, Capiz to Federico Señeres and Lourdes Villareal. They formerly resided in the Compostela Valley and Davao del Norte, but eventually moved to Butuan. Roy studied at the Primary Butuan Elementary School, Butuan Central Elementary School, and Agusan National High School. He later earned a Bachelor of Arts degree at the University of Santo Tomas in 1967 and a Bachelor of Laws at San Beda College in 1971. He passed the bar exam the same year.

He was also a columnist of the tabloid, Pilipino Star Ngayon. His column is entitled Amba's Briefs.

== Political career ==
In 1998 Señeres Ran for a Seat in The Senate under the Reporma–LM Ticket of Renato De Villa but lost placing 29th with 1,165,455 Votes. He chaired the National Labor Relations Commission of the Department of Labor and Employment from 2002 to 2005. During the 2013 elections, he won a seat in the Philippine House of Representatives as the representative of the OFW Family Club party-list.

=== United Arab Emirates ===
He served as a labor attaché in Abu Dhabi in the United Arab Emirates from 1983 to 1989. During his tenure as a labor attaché, his residence served as a refuge for Overseas Filipino Workers (OFW) who fled from their employers. This would lead to the establishment of the first Overseas Workers Welfare Administration (OWWA) center in the Emirati city.

Señeres was instrumental in the handling of the case of Sarah Balabagan, an OFW who was on death row in the UAE for stabbing her male employer. The OFW justified her deed as an act of self-defence against rape. Through his reported connections with the royal family of Abu Dhabi, he helped secure a pardon for the migrant worker, having convinced the UAE authorities that Balabagan was only 15 years old and not 22 as indicated in her falsified passport.

=== Presidential bid ===
Roy Señeres
- Campaign: 2016 Philippine presidential election
- Candidate: Roy Señeres (President); Member of the Philippine House of Representatives from the OFW Family Club Party List (2013–2016); Chairman of the National Labor Relations of the Department of Labor and Employment (2002–2005); Philippine Ambassador to the United Arab Emirates (1994–1998)
- Affiliation: Partido ng Manggagawa at Magsasaka: OFW Family party-list
- Status: Announced: October 24, 2014; Launched: October 11, 2015; Ended: February 5, 2016
- Headquarters: Las Piñas, Philippines
- Key people: Atty. Apolonia "Polly" Comia-Soguilon
- Slogan(s): Roy Señeres, Isalba Mo Ang Bayan Ko; End Contractualization
- Chant: "Tulungan Natin Siya!" "Amba!" "Señeres!"

Website
- www.royseneres.com

Señeres first bared his intention to run for the Philippine presidency on October 20, 2014, during the launch of his Respect our Security of Employment (ROSE) movement in Butuan.

He reiterated his plan for candidacy in the 2016 presidential election one year later during a briefing in the House of Representatives. Under the Partido ng Manggagawa at Magsasaka, he fielded a vice-presidential candidate and a 12-man senatorial slate, and launched his presidential bid on October 11, 2015, at the Liwasang Bonifacio in Manila. At the time of the filing of his certificate of candidacy, Señeres was a Philippine congressman for the OFW Family Club Party List. He was mostly involved in labor issues having been an Ambassador to the United Arab Emirates overseeing the plight of Overseas Filipino Workers in the gulf state including the case of Sarah Balabagan. He was also the chairman of National Labor Relations Commission.

Señeres' bid was the subject of humor during meetings in the Philippine House of Representatives, as it was viewed as a "stunt" by fellow congressmen. Señeres was chided that he needed first to run a serious nationwide campaign (i.e. senatorial) to have a chance of winning the Philippine presidency. Señeres subsequently expressed his hope that he would not be declared a "nuisance candidate" by the Comelec.

Señeres expressed the possibility that the then-incumbent Davao City mayor Rodrigo Duterte would be his substitute candidate should Duterte become a pro-life advocate. However, Señeres later refused to substitute for Duterte and criticized the latter's inevitable decision to pursue the presidency, and claimed that Duterte should have endorsed and supported him instead.

On November 22, 2015, he launched the National Headquarters of the Partido ng Manggagawa at Magsasaka for his presidential campaign in Las Piñas.

Señeres said that he was neither expecting nor soliciting campaign resources from big business firms. He noted that other candidates were using private jets and helicopters owned by mall owners, and claimed that those candidates became beholden to those who provided them such transport.

For his campaign method which he dubbed as a Kalyeserye style of approach, Señeres organized small meetings in streets and publicly accessible places such as parking lots. He said that the primary audience for his campaign were contractual employees of big shopping malls.

Despite these initiatives, however, citing a failing health condition due to his long-standing bout with diabetes, Señeres finally decided to withdraw his presidential bid on February 5, 2016.

=== Campaign political positions ===
==== Labor ====
Señeres campaigned against contractualization which he described as illegal under the Labor Code. He went further to say that major shopping malls were those mostly responsible for the practice of contractualization. He said that contractuals do not receive labor benefits and neither are given security of tenure. In the context of contractual workers employed in shopping malls, he argued that billions of pesos that would have been given to them as benefits (such as the 13th month pay) are utilized by their employers to build more malls in the country and abroad.

Alleging that the government is avoiding the issue, he said that he decided to run for president because he can't make executive orders if he stays in Congress, adding that he would direct the Department of Labor and Employment to implement the law against contractualization if he is elected.

He promised permanent employment to both workers in the private and government sectors.

==== Capital punishment ====
Señeres cast himself as a "pro-life" candidate, disagreeing with then-presidential candidate Rodrigo Duterte's opinion that drug lords and syndicate minions deserve the death penalty, which the former described as "pro-death".

==== Rodrigo Duterte ====
Señeres was critical of Duterte, stating "irreconcilable differences" with the latter. He described himself as "pro-life" and diametrically described Duterte as "pro-death". However, it was reported by the Philippine Daily Inquirer that two Supreme Court justices, Jose Catral Mendoza and Bienvenido Reyes, pressured Señeres to withdraw from the presidential election in favor of Duterte in a meeting of fraternity brothers in Pasig on December 4, 2015. The four are part of the Lex Talionis Fraternity which was founded in San Beda College. Seneres denied the newspaper report a week later, saying that he discussed other matters with the justices, and that two other lawyers in attendance were those who offered the possibility of Duterte substituting him.

==== Others ====
In October 2015, Señeres revealed that he would vote for either Grace Poe or Miriam Defensor-Santiago, his presidential competitors, rather than for himself, to "bring back the 'old custom' of chivalry".

=== Senatorial slate ===
- Sultan Sharif Ibrahim Albani
- Aldin Ali
- Sandra Cam, jueteng whistleblower
- Gion Guonet
- Sherwin Gatchalian, representative from Valenzuela
- Rey Langit, radio and TV broadcaster
- Alan Montano, labor rights legal counsel
- Gerry del Mundo, lawyer
- Samuel Pagdilao, representative from ACT-CIS partylist
- Ted Ong, lawyer
- Susan Ople, OFW rights advocate
- Jude Sabio, lawyer
- Dionisio Santiago, former PDEA deputy director

=== Endorsements ===
Roy Señeres

Organizations

- OFW Friends of Roy Señeres Everywhere (OFW Forse)
- Alisin ang Tanikala ng Kontraktwalisasyon at Kurapsyon (ATAKK)
- Respect our Security of Employment Movement

== Death ==
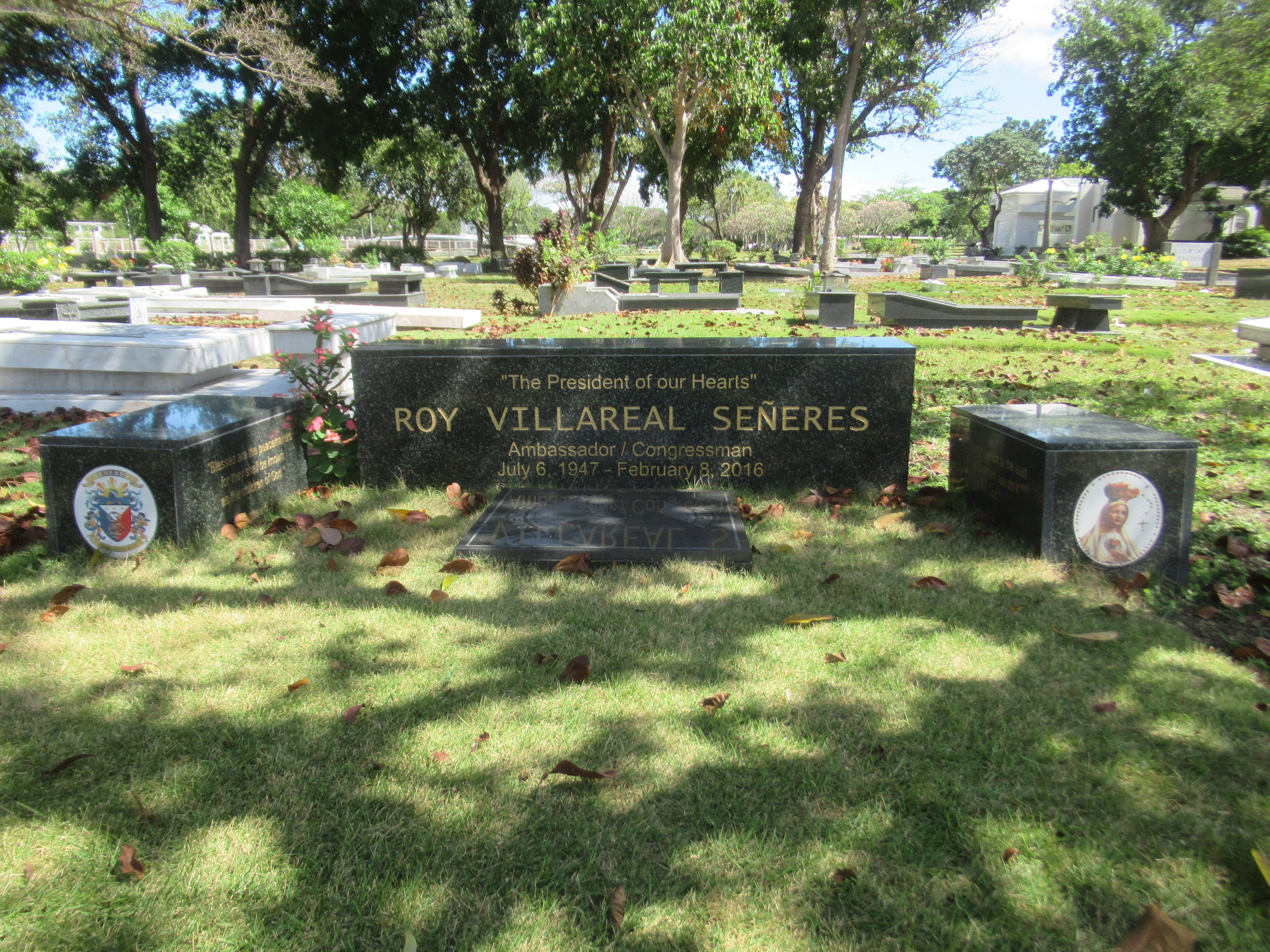
Señeres' grave at Manila Memorial Park – Sucat.

Shortly after withdrawing his bid for presidency for health reasons, Señeres suffered a cardiac arrest and was admitted to the intensive care unit of the St. Luke's Medical Center in Taguig, which according to his sister-in-law was triggered by his diabetes. On February 8, 2016, in an interview with DZMM, his eldest son RJ said that Señeres died from his cardiac arrest that morning while at the intensive care unit. Señeres was 68 years old and was survived by his wife and their six children.

== Aftermath ==
Señeres withdrew from the presidential race. However his certificate of withdrawal was not accepted since the law mandates that the candidate must file the document personally. Señeres died shortly after he backed out from the elections. In case of death, substitution is allowed provided that a member of the same party of and has the same surname of the candidate concerned.

On February 9, 2016, Señeres daughter, Hannah filed a motion to the Commission on Elections stating that he would not be substituted saying that it was among of his last wishes. Señeres was also said to refuse to endorse any of the five remaining presidential candidates. On the same day, an earlier motion was filed by Partido ng Manggagawa at Magsasaka to declare Señeres' presidential candidate slot vacant. Apolonia Comia-Soguilon, a lawyer and member of the party since 1995 was touted by Señeres' party to be Señeres' substitute candidate.

== Personal life ==
He was married to Minnie Seneres with 7 children: Jay Thomas, Christian, Roy Jr. (RJ), Monique, Hannah, Hazel, Christopher. RJ and Hannah are the first and second nominees of OFW Family Club party-list.
