= Mila (2001 film) =

2001 film by Joel Lamangan

- Official movie poster
- Directed by: Joel C. Lamangan
- Screenplay by: Ricky Lee
- Produced by: Charo Santos-Concio; Malou N. Santos; Elma S. Medua
- Starring: Maricel Soriano
- Cinematography: Monino Duque
- Edited by: Tara Illenberger
- Music by: Jessie Lasaten
- Production company: Star Cinema
- Distributed by: Star Cinema
- Release date: June 27, 2001
- Running time: 116 minutes
- Country: Philippines
- Language: Filipino

Mila is a 2001 Filipino drama film directed by Joel C. Lamangan from a screenplay written by Ricky Lee, based on the life story of Anita Pamintuan. Starring Maricel Soriano in the title role, the film revolves around a public school teacher who joined a strike where she and her fellow educators demanded the government increase their wages and benefits. It co-stars Piolo Pascual, Princess Punzalan, Cherry Pie Picache, Kaye Abad, Serena Dalrymple, Jiro Manio and Angelica Panganiban.

Produced and distributed by Star Cinema, it was theatrically released on June 27, 2001, as part of the film studio's 8th anniversary offering. In 2018, the film was digitally restored and remastered by ABS-CBN Film Restoration, in partnership with Central Digital Lab.

== Plot ==
Set during the administration of Corazon C. Aquino, Mila Cabangon is a public school teacher who deeply loves and cares for her students despite living with her abusive and good-for-nothing husband, Nato, whom she later leaves because he would often take all of her salary for gambling. She also would be a second parent to Jenny, who is struggling to learn and being pressured by her mother, and Boyet, who was always forced to sell sampaguita by his lazy and drunkard father. During a teacher's convention, Metro Manila teachers decided to go on strike. However, the school principal, Miss Pangan, threatened to terminate them if they went on strike. Despite all of this, they went on strike. Mila met Primo, a young waiter, and they started living together. But, as time goes by, Mila would discover that Primo is addicted to shabu. He said that he would do this every time he has problems. The teachers on strike decided to go on a hunger strike after the Department of Education issued an order for all teachers to return to their duties or they would be dismissed. Primo would become worse. Mila found out that some of their appliances are being sold by Primo, and the money is used by Primo to buy shabu. As Primo attempted to take the stereo, Mila stopped him and destroyed the stereo, and broke up with him.

Primo wanted to reconcile with Mila. Mila agreed to reconcile with Primo on condition that he undergo rehabilitation. After having a conversation with fellow teacher Linda, Mila left and roamed around Manila until she reached the red-light district of Ermita, where she met Winona, a known GRO, Rona, and her daughter Leni. She also encounters street children, including Peklat. There, she became a teacher not only on the street but in some GROs in Ermita.

Upon the assumption of Fidel V. Ramos as president, some of the Metro Manila teachers who went on hunger strike became sick. Linda and Teresa saw Mila and asked her to visit them. There, she was reunited with her fellow co-teachers. As she returns to Ermita, Mila, Winona, and Peklat see Rona bringing Leni to an American pedophile by Kalbo, who is a known pimp in Ermita. But, Mila told the American that he can be subjected to possible imprisonment or deportation. The American understood what Mila said and left. This left Rona furious. As time goes by, Mila would suffer from coughs due to her life living in the streets of Ermita. Kalbo was arrested for the exploitation of minor women. When Winona saw it, she feared that she might be a target. Her lifeless body was found along the shores of Manila Bay. Afterwards, by order of Mayor Alfredo Lim, all nightclubs and bars in the red-light district of Ermita were closed, causing some of the GROs to lose their livelihood. Rona and Leni decided to go to Carmona, Cavite to start a new life, and Rona reconciled with Mila. She would visit her ailing mother. Mila would ask her why she abandoned Mila, and they reconciled. One rainy evening, Mila decided to join a fellow homeless family despite her deteriorating health, before going to sleep with only an umbrella.

The next morning, Belay and Peklat tried to wake up Mila, but she never woke up. Mila was given a hero's funeral by her fellow teachers, attended by her students and from Ermita. It was also during Mila's funeral that the teachers who went on strike were reinstated to their teaching duties.

== Cast and characters ==
- Maricel Soriano as Mila Cabangon
- Piolo Pascual as Primo
- Princess Punzalan as Linda
- Cherry Pie Picache as Rona
- Kaye Abad as Winona
- Serena Dalrymple as Jenny, a student who has been in the third grade for two years
- Jiro Manio as Peklat
- Angelica Panganiban as Leni
- Luis Alandy as Ruel
- Nonie Buencamino as Nato, Mila's abusive and gambling-addicted husband
- Eva Darren as Mila's mother
- B.J. De Jesus as Boyet
- Kathleen Hermosa as Teresa
- Mel Kimura as Lucille
- Alfred Labatos as Momoy
- Don Laurel as Ronnel
- Tony Mabesa as Mr. De Castro
- Mario Magallona as Rambo
- Bea Nicolas as Belay
- Tom Olivar as Torres
- Jim Pebanco as Noli Malvar
- Caridad Sanchez as Mrs. Pangan
- Berting Labra as Uncle Dodoy, Mila's uncle
- Soliman Cruz as Kalbo
- Florencio A. Pili as Mila's co-teacher

=== Cameo ===
- Noel Cabangon as himself

== Production ==
=== Development ===
The film was based on the life of Anita Pamintuan, a public elementary school teacher who died in 1990 following her involvement in a hunger strike organized by teachers' groups. Ricky Lee, who previously collaborated with director Joel Lamangan in films including Himala (1982), Pangako ng Kahapon (1994), and The Flor Contemplacion Story (1995), conducted research about her after he was lingered from seeing a photo of her lifeless body at a newspaper and eventually, made into a screenplay. Lee originally pitched the screenplay to various film producers in 1992 and Nora Aunor considering for the role but it never realized. Finally, after years of being part of Lee's unproduced works, Star Cinema, which received box-office successes in the past year, gave a green light to the project.

=== MTRCB rating controversy ===
Despite the film having no "adult-aimed" themes, it was almost given an R-18 rating by the MTRCB due to the two uses of severe profane words uttered by the characters of Maricel Soriano and Cherry Pie Picache. Joel Lamangan, the film's director, criticized the censor board and blamed them as the "destroyer of the Philippine film industry" after MTRCB chair Anding Roces gave the said rating to the film. The censor board finally gave the film a PG-13 rating instead of R-18 to settle the issue.

== Marketing ==
As part of the film's release, Star Cinema launched a nationwide essay-writing contest named "Sino ang Mila sa Buhay Ko – The Greatest Teacher In My Life", where participants would create an essay about their Mila in their lives. The panelists for the contest were the film's screenwriter Ricky Lee; singer and youth role model Cris Villonco; Etta Rosales, the representative of Akbayan party-list; Benilda Santos, the chairperson of Ateneo de Manila University - Filipino Department; and Tammy Bejerano, the senior creative manager of the film studio.

== Release ==
The film was first premiered in the Philippines on June 26, 2001, at SM Megamall and had a general release on the following day. It had a Philippine television premiere on Cinema One and a world premiere on Cinemax.

== Recognitions ==
=== FAMAS ===
- Nominated Best Child Actor for Jiro Manio at the 2002 FAMAS Awards.

=== Gawad Urian ===
- Nominated Best Actress for Maricel Soriano at the 2002 Gawad Urian Awards.
