= Kung Mawawala Ka =

Philippine television drama series

- Title card
- Also known as: A World Without You
- Genre: Romantic drama
- Created by: Roy C. Iglesias
- Developed by: Roy C. Iglesias; Jun Lana; Dinno Erece
- Directed by: Joel Lamangan; Soxie Topacio; Argel Joseph
- Starring: Sunshine Dizon; Cogie Domingo
- Theme music composer: Ogie Alcasid
- Ending theme: "Kung Mawawala Ka" by Ogie Alcasid and Karylle
- Country of origin: Philippines
- Original language: Tagalog
- No. of episodes: 303

Production
- Production locations: Metro Manila, Philippines
- Camera setup: Multiple-camera setup
- Running time: 12–18 minutes
- Production company: GMA Entertainment TV

Original release
- Network: GMA Network
- Release: April 8, 2002 – June 6, 2003

Kung Mawawala Ka (transl. if you will be gone / international title: A World Without You) is a Philippine television drama romance series broadcast by GMA Network. Directed by Joel Lamangan, Soxie Topacio and Argel Joseph, it stars Sunshine Dizon and Cogie Domingo. It premiered on April 8, 2002 on the network's Telebabad line up. The series concluded on June 6, 2003, with a total of 303 episodes.

The series is streaming online on YouTube.

== Cast and characters ==
Cast

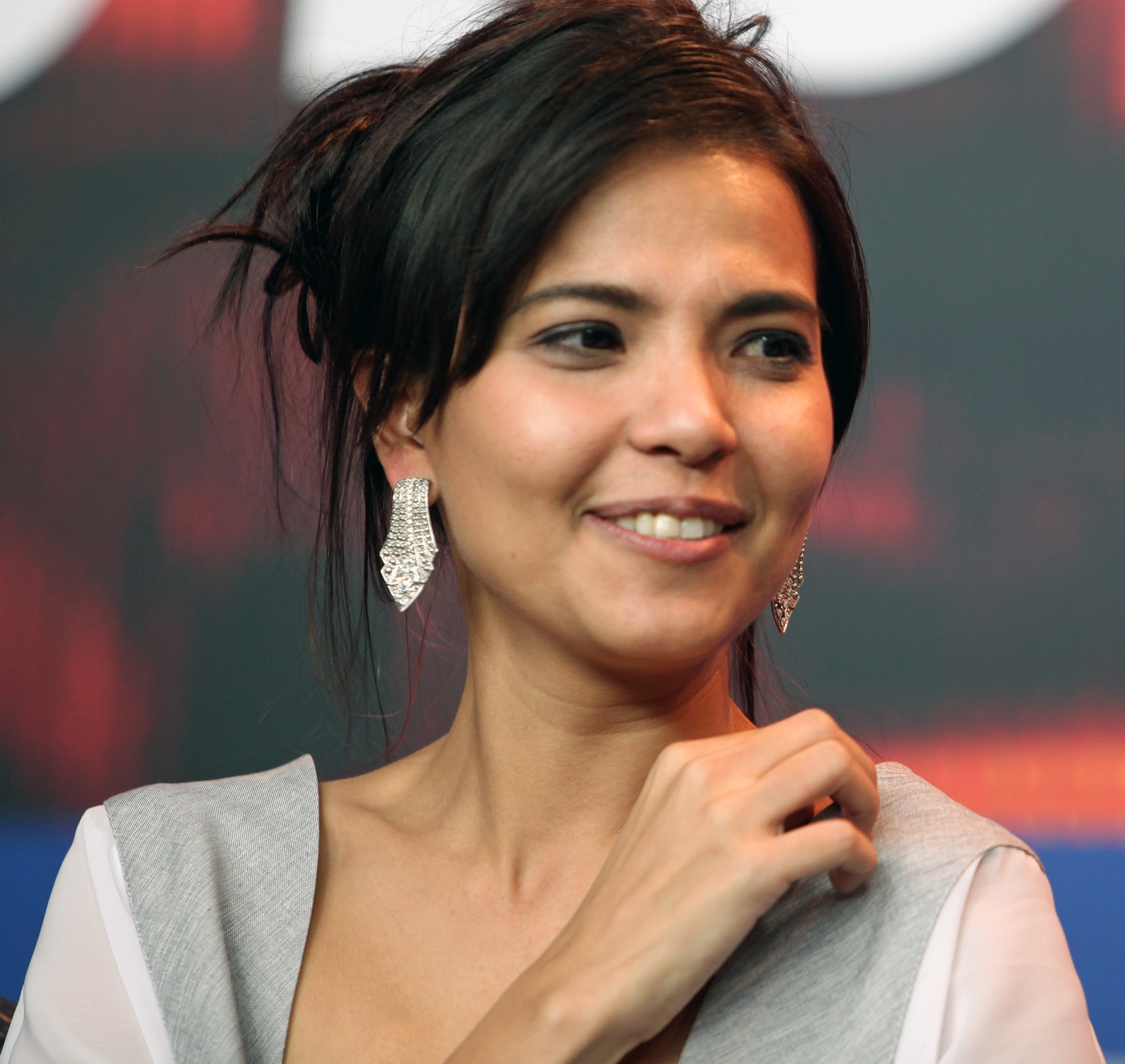
Alessandra De Rossi

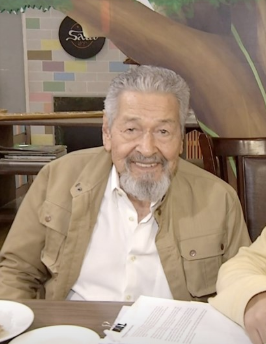
Eddie Garcia

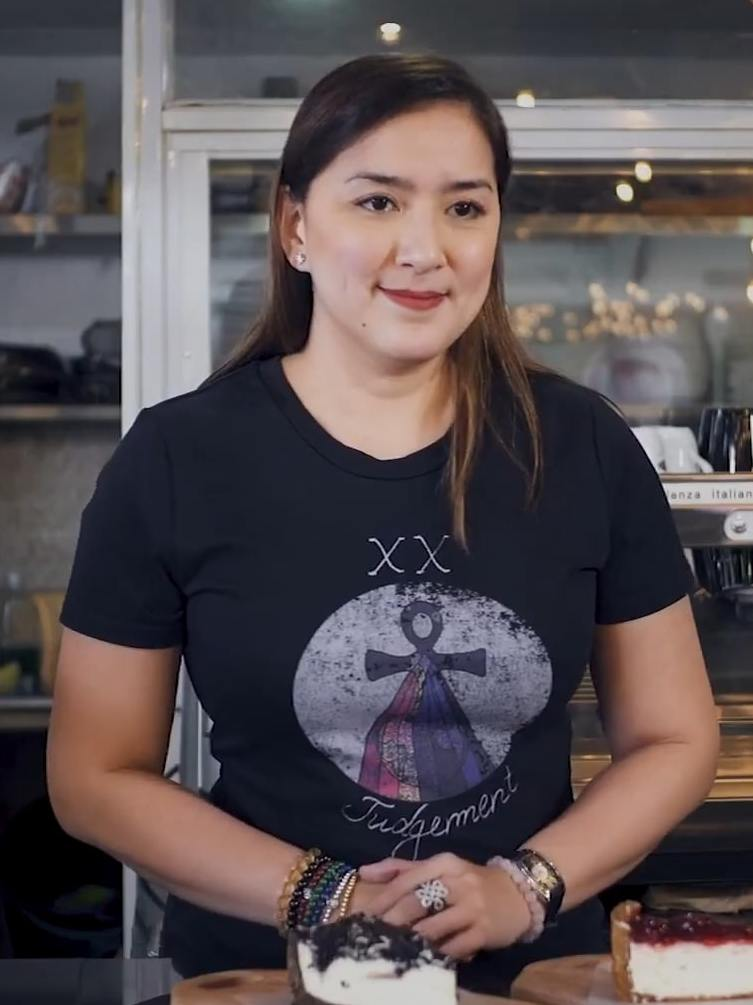
Ara Mina

Lead cast

- Sunshine Dizon as Rosa Camilla Montemayor
- Cogie Domingo as Carlito Valiente

Supporting cast

- Eddie Garcia as Leandro Montemayor
- Liza Lorena as Iluminada Montemayor
- Gloria Diaz as Czarina Montemayor
- Hilda Koronel as Alicia Montemayor
- Sharmaine Arnaiz as Amanda Montemayor
- Raymond Bagatsing as Alberto Montemayor
- Princess Punzalan as Ernestina Montemayor
- Alessandra De Rossi as Paloma Montemayor
- Ara Mina as Lucinda Montemayor

Recurring cast

- Armida Siguion-Reyna as Romina Salgado
- Vic Vargas as Carlos Valiente
- Marianne dela Riva as Cynthia Valiente
- Iza Calzado as Phoebe Tuazon
- Maybelyn dela Cruz as Guadalupe Valiente
- Daniel Fernando as Alegre
- Eddie Gutierrez as Tomas Locsin
- Tony Mabesa as Asturias
- Jay Manalo as Nestor Miranda
- Spanky Manikan as Gonzalo
- Jim Pebanco as Emil
- Miko Sotto as Dindo
- Jomari Yllana as Rafael
- Malou Crisologo as Elaine
- Daisy Reyes as Clarissa Rosales
- Angie Castrence as Angie
- Lara Fabregas as Marla Gatchalian
- Ryan Ramos as Jonathan Quirino
- Gardo Versoza as Edmund Amparo
- JJ Zamora as Charlie Valiente
