= Enchanted Garden =

- Title card
- Genre: Fantasy, romance
- Written by: Renato Custodio, Jr. Abi Lam-Parayno; Adrian Ho; Charlotte Dianco; El Ortiz
- Directed by: Joel Lamangan; Eric Quizon; Joyce Bernal
- Starring: Alex Gonzaga; Alice Dixson; BB Gandanghari; Ruffa Gutierrez; Zoren Legaspi; Rufa Mae Quinto; Daniel Matsunaga
- Theme music composer: Boy Christopher Ramos
- Opening theme: "Ikaw Pa Rin" by Melbelline Caluag
- Country of origin: Philippines
- Original languages: Tagalog; Enchanta
- No. of episodes: 113

Production
- Executive producer: Edlyn Tallada-Abuel
- Production location: Batangas City
- Running time: 30-45 minutes

Original release
- Network: TV5
- Release: July 30, 2012 – January 4, 2013

Related
- Encantadia

Enchanted Garden is a Philippine fantasy-drama TV series broadcast by TV5. Starring Alex Gonzaga, Alice Dixson, BB Gandanghari, Ruffa Gutierrez, Zoren Legaspi, Rufa Mae Quinto and Daniel Matsunaga. It aired from July 30, 2012 to January 4, 2013, and was replaced by Kidlat.

== Plot ==
Enchanted Garden is set against the entrancing garden world of Eden, parallel to the land of mortals where Queen Jasmina and her daughters Alvera, Valeriana and Quassia live. Alvera, Valerianna and Quassia are Diwanis — the appointed guardians of all plants and trees. Jealousy separates the sisters as Valerianna discovers Menandro's love for her sister Alvera. Menandro and Alvera's love brings forth a child, Aya, who grows up in the mortal world.

== Cast ==
=== The Garden of Eden ===
Cast	Role	Character Information
Alex Gonzaga	Diwani Olivia / Aya	The only daughter of Diwani Alvera and the Edentor Menandro. Beholder of the power of wind and darkness. Her mother exiled her to the mortal lands to save her from the punishment of the council of Eden. She was later adopted by a matriarch, Lola Biring, yet she suffered much from Lola Biring's daughter Gigi and daughter-in-law Dolores. Later, she became the close accomplice of Michiko - that is, the owner of Michiko's Garden, a spa business. Returning to Eden, she fought for her destiny and ascended to the throne as Queen Olivia after killing Queen Michiko, yet relinquished the throne to follow her childhood friend and love, Paco.
Alice Dixson	Diwani Alvera / Elaine Malforie	Eldest of the three Diwanis and beholder: of the power of the sun. The rightful heir to the throne of Eden, she fell in love with an Edentor, Menandro - a serious crime in which her offspring is held punishable. Her jealous sister Valeriana banished her to the mortal world with her child and erased her memory. Alvera's alter-ego, Elaine Malforie, is a rich businesswoman, locked in furious rivalry with the famous spa Michiko's Garden.
Ruffa Gutierrez	Diwani Valeriana	Queen Jasmina's second daughter and possessor of the power of water. She vied with her sister for Menandro's love and when she discovered that Alvera and Menandro had borne a child, she banished Alvera and her offspring in the mortal world, and with the help from Helfora, Eden's evil tree, she crowned herself Queen of Eden and ensnared Menandro in her clutches. She was later released from Helfora's bonds with the help of the three Diwanis and Helfora's child, Michiko. She was the incumbent Queen of Eden until the resurrected Helfora usurped it from her.
Rufa Mae Quinto	Diwani Quassia	The youngest of the three Diwanis and keeper of the power of the earth. She helped Alvera and her offspring Olivia escape Eden and as punishment, the council of Eden transfigured her into a rabbit. In this form, she was able to communicate with her nima (niece) in the mortal world, keeping her true form disguised. She has feelings for an Edentor, Kamagong.
BB Gandanghari	Queen Michiko / Helfora	The mysterious rival of Elaine Malforie in the mortal world. Being the owner of Michiko's Garden and the guardian of its portal, she grew close to Aya and help her find her way back to Eden. However, her purpose was to use Olivia to transport her back to Eden and usurp the throne as revenge for the doings of the council, who punished her mother Helfora. Her past ego, Bakun, was one of Helfora's sons and the twin brother of Menandro, making her Aya's aunt. Bakun evaded the council by transforming into her mother's image using a fruit from the wicked tree and escaping to the mortal world, she married a Japanese tycoon and learned business. Ruthless yet malevolently powerful, she was cast down by the four Diwanis along with Queen Oleya.
Zoren Legaspi	Menandro	A soldier of Eden and Olivia's father. He fell in love with Alvera and bore them a child, Olivia. However, Valeriana ensnared him to wickedness by giving him the dark fruit of Helfora, thus, he fell under the control of the dark power. He was actually one of Helfora's sons, and through him, evil blood runs through the veins of his offspring, Olivia.
Marita Zobel	Reyna Jasmina (Queen Jasmina)	The second Queen of Eden in the series. As mother to the three Diwanis, she holds the power of mother nature and able to control earth, sun and water. Jasmina was once the head of the Council of Eden in her predecessor's, Queen Oleya, reign. As punishment for Oleya's suspicions, she and the Council dethrone Oleya and she was hailed as the second Queen. She fell ill because of the rivalry between Valeriana and Alvera
Tony Mabesa	Saulo	He is the chief counsellor of the Council of Eden. He has long studied the history of Eden, as well as interpret its prophecies through the use of leaves and flowers. He was one of the Council to punish Helfora for her malicious deeds in worshiping the root of evil (Ugat ng Kasamaan) and also helped dethrone Queen Oleya during the tenure of Jasmina as head of the Council. He also helped the Diwanis in the war against Queen Michiko.
Jim Pebanco	Borago	Queen Jasmina's evil spokesperson. He served the Queens Valeriana (while imprisoned in her evil form) and Michiko and was the butler of the monarchs. Along with the other evil Edentors, he was banished from Eden after Queen Michiko's death, but he was resurrected when Queen Helfora returned to Eden.
Lian Paz	Alipa	The keeper of Queen Alvera's daughter while still on the womb of a flower. She is also the mother of Molave. She was killed under orders from Queen Valeriana after refusing to divulge Alvera and Olivia's whereabouts.
Edgar Allan Guzman	Molave	A brave soldier of Eden. Alipa's son, he was tasked to search for Alvera and Menandro's daughter in the mortal world. In doing so, he fell in love with Aya and vie for her love with Paco. Nevertheless, he was one of the faithful Edentors to fight by the Diwanis' side during Queen Michiko's reign. He also volunteered to search for the missing salangkays (wands) of the Diwanis after Olivia's "death", under the identity of Arbutus.
Ahron Villena	Kamagong / Aris	An Edentor and protector of chief counsel Saulo. Along with Molave, he is also a faithful Edentor who stood by the Diwanis' side against Queen Michiko's reign. He has developed feelings for Diwani Quassia.
Mon Confiado	Balete	One of the soldiers of Eden under Queen Valeriana's regime. He suspected Molave that the one whom he brought to Eden was not really the true Diwani Olivia, who was actually Ella. He was later slain in the battle against Queen Valeriana.
Jazz Ocampo	Amapola	Amapola was Queen Jasmina's servant. Saulo ordered her to get the salangkays from Queen Valeriana's grasp, yet she was caught and imprisoned. She later joined the rebellion forces under Diwani Olivia and stood by the Diwanis' side during the war against Michiko. She was a good friend to Olivia and she also likes Molave.
Lilia Cuntapay	Oracula	The oracle adviser of Queen Valeriana. She can foresee and interpret the future of Eden. After the fall of the evil Valeriana, she sided with the Diwanis and offered to have her as a spy to Queen Michiko. She, along with Saulo, also devised the disguise of Molave in a mission to liberate the salangkays, acting as the latter's decoy.

=== World of Mortals ===
Cast	Role	Character Information
Martin Escudero	Paco/Ipil	Aya's childhood friend that helps and protects her. He is secretly in love to Aya. He was later cursed into a monster
Daniel Matsunaga	Mark Carreras	An American businessman concerned in exporting coconut food products. He will meet Aya on Michiko's Garden.
Luz Valdez	Aling Biring	An Albularya (herbal medicine practitioner), adopted Aya when she is looking for herbs on the forest together with Gordon. She is the grandmother of Gordon and Gigi but served as their mother brought by the death of their parents. She will treat Aya as her own daughter / granddaughter and will teach her a lot about herbal medicine. She died within the 10-year period of Diwani Olivia being locked in a dome.
Christopher Roxas	Gordon	Aling Bring's eldest child, will treat Aya as a real sister.
Gladys Reyes	Dolores	The ambitious wife of Gordon that will make Aya's life miserable as hell.
Meg Imperial	Gigi	Aling Biring's youngest child. Together with her sister-in-law Dolores, they will make Aya's life miserable as hell.
Kuya Manzano	Mr. Vanderbilt	Rich businessman coming to do business with Ms. Michiko.
Elvis Gutierrez	Morgan	Michiko's Bodyguard
Kristel Moreno	Wendy	She is Michiko's assistant. She has a crush on Mark.
Beverly Salviejo	Garita Consuelo	A woman who hates Aya. She became Elaine's ally. She uses black magic.
Cita Astals	Mrs. Carreras	She is Mark's mother.
Veyda Inoval	Ella	Dolores' and Gordon's daughter.

=== Special participation ===
Cast	Role	Character Information
Nora Aunor	Nana Sela / Queen Oleya	The first named Queen in the series. Queen Oleya's first concern is the seemingly revenge of Helvora, whom her Council punished and cursed as an evil tree. However, her suspicions against the evil councilor of Eden led her to be dethroned by Jasmina, who was then the head of her Council. To be secured, she and her servants built a sanctuary in the mortal world, near the outskirts of Eden as a final refuge, should Helvora return. As her mortal counterpart, Nana Sela, she turned her back to Eden and brought with her a handful of her faithful servants, disguised as "healers". When she discovers Olivia's presence in her sanctuary, she was maddened because of the latter's constant meddling about Eden. Her anger severed when she discovers Olivia is a descendant of Queen Jasmina. In the war against Queen Michiko, Nana Sela finally yielded to Paco and Olivia's pleads to return to Eden. She was later locked in combat with the evil Queen while Maring and the others fended off the evil Edentors. In a last struggle, she unsheathed a root of Helvora that she obtained before she left Eden and gave it to the destined Olivia. Yet, she sacrificed herself and was killed instead. Afterwards, she made peace with the Diwanis and the Council and was given a tributary funeral.
Nadine Samonte	Maring	Queen Oleya's servant. After leaving Eden, she continued to serve Oleya (Nana Sela) in their sanctuary. When she saw Olivia's dying corpse in the forest, doubt took her that Olivia might be a creature of some kind. Yet through Aya's persuasion, she was convinced that Eden is no longer a peaceful place than it had been. She also participated in the battle against Queen Michiko.
Wendell Ramos	Javier	Michiko's past love, Javier, was shot by an unseen assassin. In order to distract the now Queen Michiko, Oracula and Saulo devised a disguise for Molave to resemble Javier to slip inside the castle and liberate the salangkays from the evil queen's clutches.
Morissette	Cora	One of Queen Oleya's servants. Along with Maring, she found Aya in the woods and tended her. She constantly reminded Aya to stay away from Nana Sela and brush off Aya's persuasion into returning to Eden. Yet in the end, she yielded and along with her fellow servants, she participated in the battle against Queen Michiko.

=== Extended cast ===
Cast	Role	Character Information
Mura	Bonsai	A mysterious creature akin to Venga, Helvora's butler. Olivia ordered him to search for Ella in the mortal world and bring her back in order to supplant Queen Helfora.
Bing Loyzaga	Queen Helfora / Emilia	Emilia is the aunt of Edmund who was murdered by the unknown gang then died in the forest. There, Helfora's root overlap to a snake and bite her so she can possess Emilia's dead body. She is the root of wickedness in Eden. She usurped the throne from Queen Valeriana and crowned herself Queen of Eden, and at her will, she transformed Eden into a frozen and icy wasteland and imprisoned Olivia inside an impervious dome.
Eula Caballero	Ella	10 years after leaving Eden, Ella was left under the care of her mother Dolores's stepfather, Gaston, and stepsisters Lucy and Demi. She began to experience dreams and premonitions about Eden, a warning that her Ate Aya is in danger. With the help of the part of Olivia's salangkay in her possession, she was able to enter Eden and assist Olivia in the liberation of the salangkays. She and Edmond later married.
JC de Vera	Edmund	A mysterious yet rich guy who fell in love with Ella. He has been seeking his Aunt Emilia's body after the latter was murdered and her body never found. She is one of Ella's companions who liberated the salangkay of Diwani Quassia. He later proposed to Ella.
John James Uy	Eric	Edmund's older brother. A regular customer of the flower shop where Ella works in, Eric was beaten by unknown men while visiting their Aunt Emilia's grave. He somewhat became the link between Ella and Edmund.
Wowie de Guzman	Gaston	Ella's bad stepfather and Dolores's second husband. He maltreats Ella profoundly with the help of the latter's stepsisters. After Dolores got news of his maltreatment towards Ella, he promised to be a good stepfather to Ella.
Yogo Singh	Spencer	Grandson of the owner of the flowershop in which Ella is employed. She came to Eden together with Ella and Edmund.
Nicole Estrada	Tere	Ella's friend. She's also employed on Spencer's flowershop.
Malak So Shdifat	Lucy	Ella's stepsister.
Mariele Ponte	Kampupot	The Dorranggol ate her Parents, King Kayabyab and Queen Silag, because her parents don't want to join Helfora. Kampupot is the princess of the Dragonas.
Iwa Moto	Santana	She is one of Helfora's servants who is a dragona that betrayed the other dragona's to join Helfora. She guards the salangkay of Diwani Quassia.

=== Cameo appearance ===
- Angeli Nicole Sanoy as young Aya
- Francheska Salcedo as young Gigi

=== Guest Cast ===
- Luz Fernandez
- Junnyka Santarin

== Monarchs of Eden ==
- Queen Oleya
  - Played by Nora Aunor

She is the first known queen of Eden. When Saulo and Jasmina punished Helvora by the use of the Shrine of Justice, she made a sanctuary on the world of mortals and renamed herself as Nana Sela. This is for refuge to Helvora's vengeance. Saulo and Jasmina didn't believe her but dethroned her.

- Queen Jasmina
  - Played by Marita Zobel

She became the second queen next to Queen Oleya. Her early years as a queen proved how good she is. Her deeds gave a fruitful Eden and Nature. She had three daughters; Diwani Alvera, Diwani Valeriana and Diwani Quassia. She became ill because of Menandro's greed over her power. She died because of saving the mortal world from Valeriana's evil attacks.

- Queen Alvera
  - Played by Alice Dixson

She ascended to the throne because her mother became ill. She is the 3rd known queen of Eden. Her short span of serving Eden as the queen was sabotaged by her sister Valeriana. She was dethroned because of giving birth to the fruit of the evil Menandro which is diwani Olivia.

- Queen Valeriana
  - Played by Ruffa Gutierrez

The 4th and 7th known queen of Eden. She replaced Alvera as the next queen. She is the start of Helvora's vengeance. She ruled for several years serving Helvora and finding Olivia for Menandro to escape from the shrine's punishment. When the Diwani's Alvera, Quassia and Olivia together Michiko caught her in a fight they removed Helvora's evil presence to her. She was reinstated to the throne after Queen Olivia's decision of giving her the throne.

- Queen Michiko
  - Played by BB Gandanghari

She is 5th and the next queen after Valeriana. The throne should be given to Olivia after removing the evil presence of Helvora to Valeriana. Unknown to the Diwanis, Michiko is one of Helvora's fruit that used Aya for entering the portal to Eden. She kills Olivia in a fight for the throne to have the opportunity to be the next queen.

- Queen Olivia
  - Played by Alex Gonzaga

The 6th known queen of Eden. She became Queen after Michiko was defeated. Queen Oleya named her the next Queen of Eden before she succumbed to her wounds. She ruled for a short time before relinquishing her throne to Diwani Valeriana after realizing who she truly loves.

- Queen Helfora
  - Played by Bing Loyzaga

The 8th queen who took the throne from Valeriana and crowned herself as the new queen. Helvora is the root of wickedness in Eden. She ruled in vengeance and evilness.

== Eden terminologies ==
- Diwani

A, Queen Jasmina. This title can be passed by the Diwani mother to her daughter. Olivia / Aya, Diwani Alvera's daughter is also entitled a Diwani.

- Eden

A land of the new beings where the Edenians and Edentors live.

- Edentor

A term for an Eden warrior or a male Eden creature.

- Edenian

A term for female Eden creature.

- Venga

An evil tree and servant of Helfora located secretly at the end-forest of Eden. It has black powers and was once used by Diwani Valeriana to own the heart and love of Menandro. The evil tree was a servant of Helvora who was once an Eden creature and guardian, punished by the council elders of Eden because of greed of power over the world of Eden. He was later killed by Helfora, thus regretting serving her. He told Bonsai about the whereabouts of the salangkays, the first one in the Servera, while the second in Hades.

- Kartun

Also an evil tree and servant of Helvora. After Helvora ruled Eden, Kartun took the memory of Diwani Quassia, Kamagong, and Molave. He also took the being of Paco, making him a monster,

- Helfora

The evil tree who opposes the good leadership to Eden of Queen Oleya. She is the mother of Bakun and Menandro.

- Viña

A strand of hair made of vine that indicates a Diwani or a royal blooded Eden guardian.

- Nima

An Eden word for niece.

- Bundok ng Kaparis

A Mountain wherein Ella raised her wand and the Ice all over Eden melted

- Duranggol

Evil creatures That appeared during the Ice Season of Eden. They ate many Edenians as well as Edentors.

- Dambana ng Katarungan (Shrine of Justice)

A powerful shrine that gives justice to crimes of Eden guardians.

- Salangkay (Wand)

A magic wand made of a tree-branch, holds the powers of sun, water and earth. Queen Jasmina's salangkay holds all of the environmental powers while her daughters has each of the three. Ella's salangkay was given to her by Olivia.

- Dama

A term for the queen's maid.

- Dragona

A creature that is made from fire formed into a human form. Kampupot and Santana are dragonas.

- Tulay ng Katotohanan (Bridge of Truth)

A Bridge where the flowers tell the secrets who ever walk there.

- Inang Kalikasan

The One Who Create Eden and help the Edenians and Edentors.

- Hades

A place where Helfora hide the salangkay of Diwani Quassia and it's guarded by Santana.

- Serbera

An evil place where Molave, Garita, Ella, Paco, and Diwani Quassia went to go to the Kingdom of Eden. Helfora also put the salangkay of Diwani Alvera in Servera. The Tulay ng Katotohanan can be found there.

- Amborllia

The Amborillia is the moon in Eden.

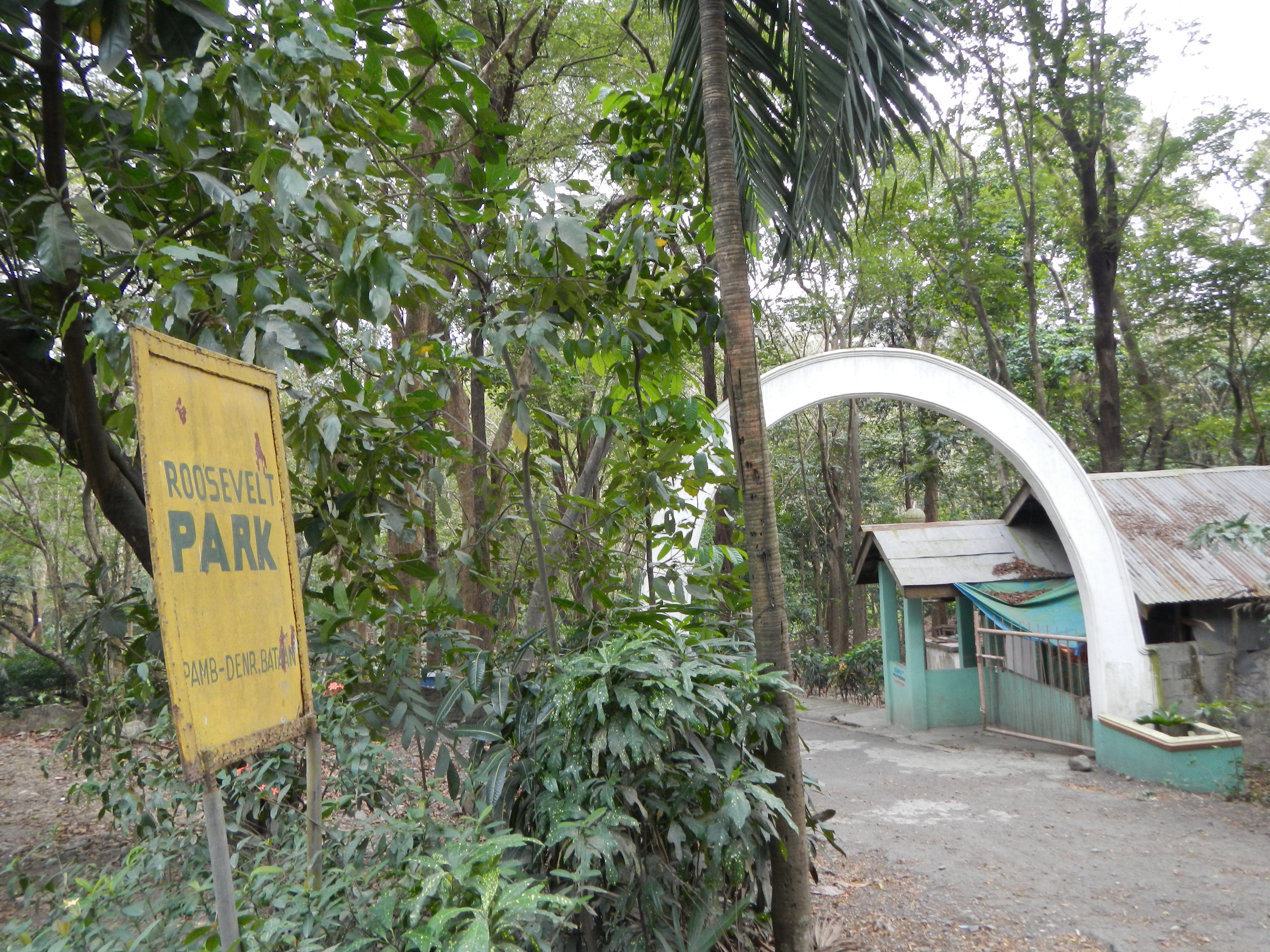
Roosevelt Park (Dinalupihan, Bataan Park) is the location shooting of "Enchanted Garden"

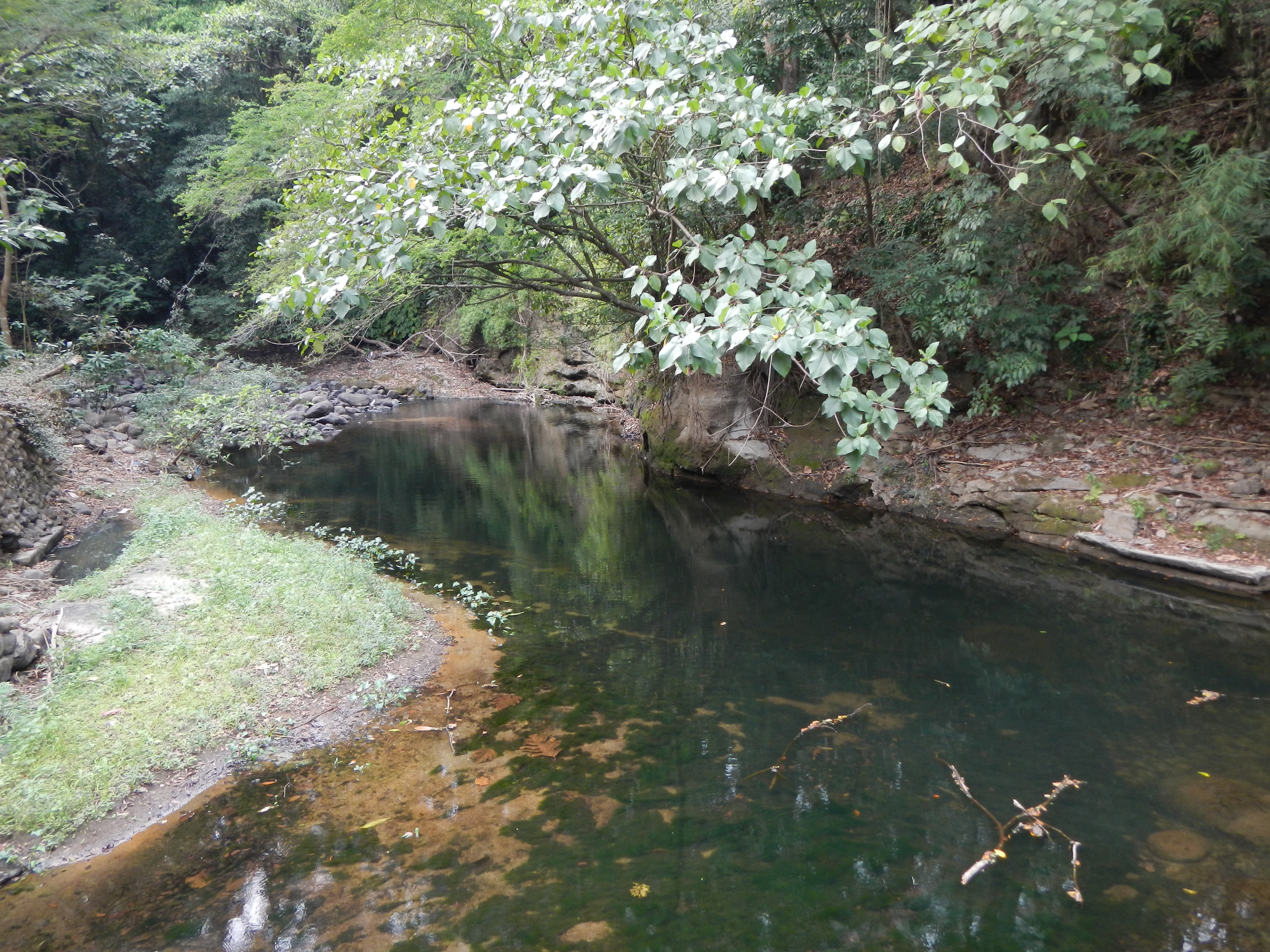
The creek

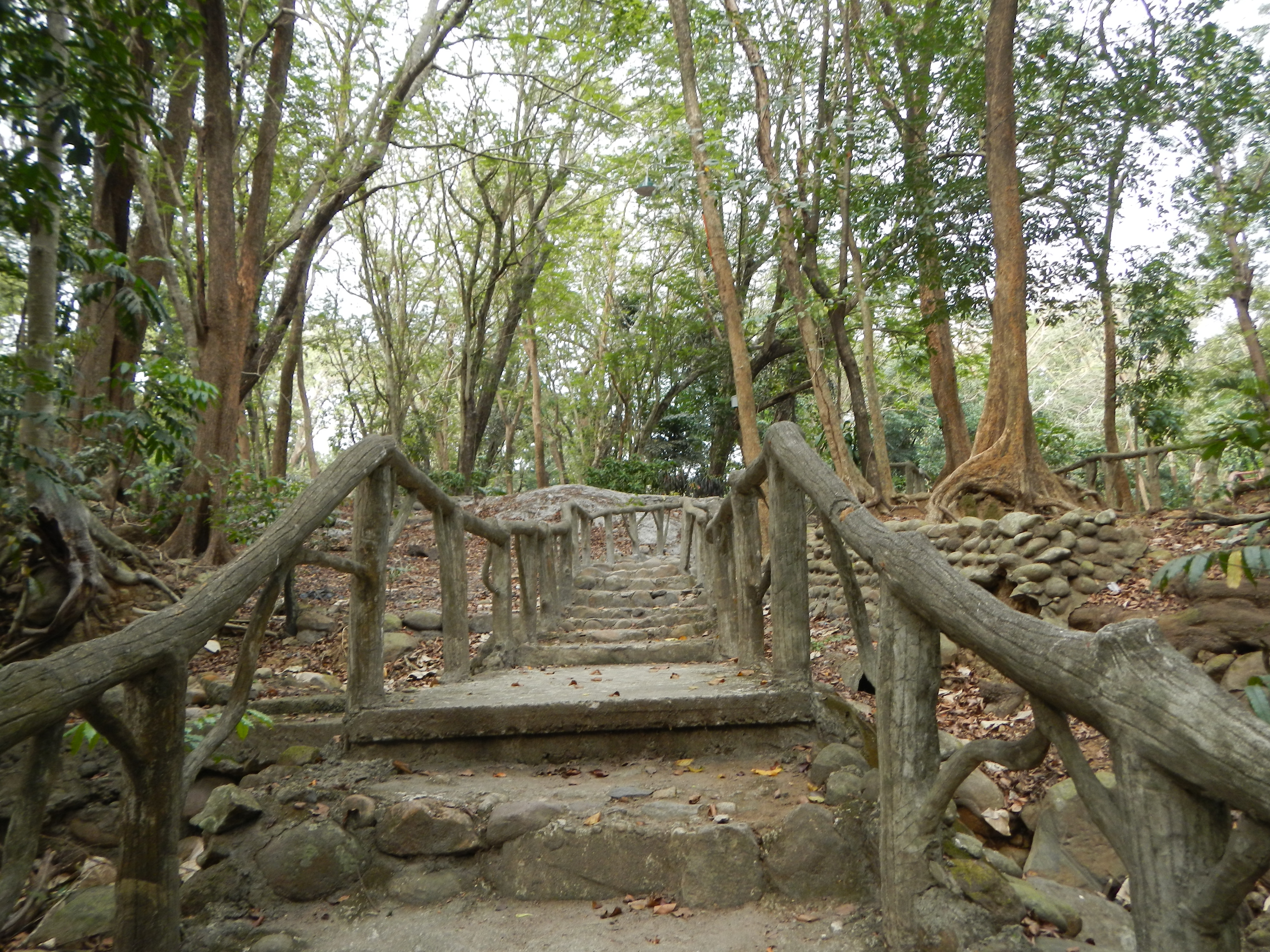
Bridge

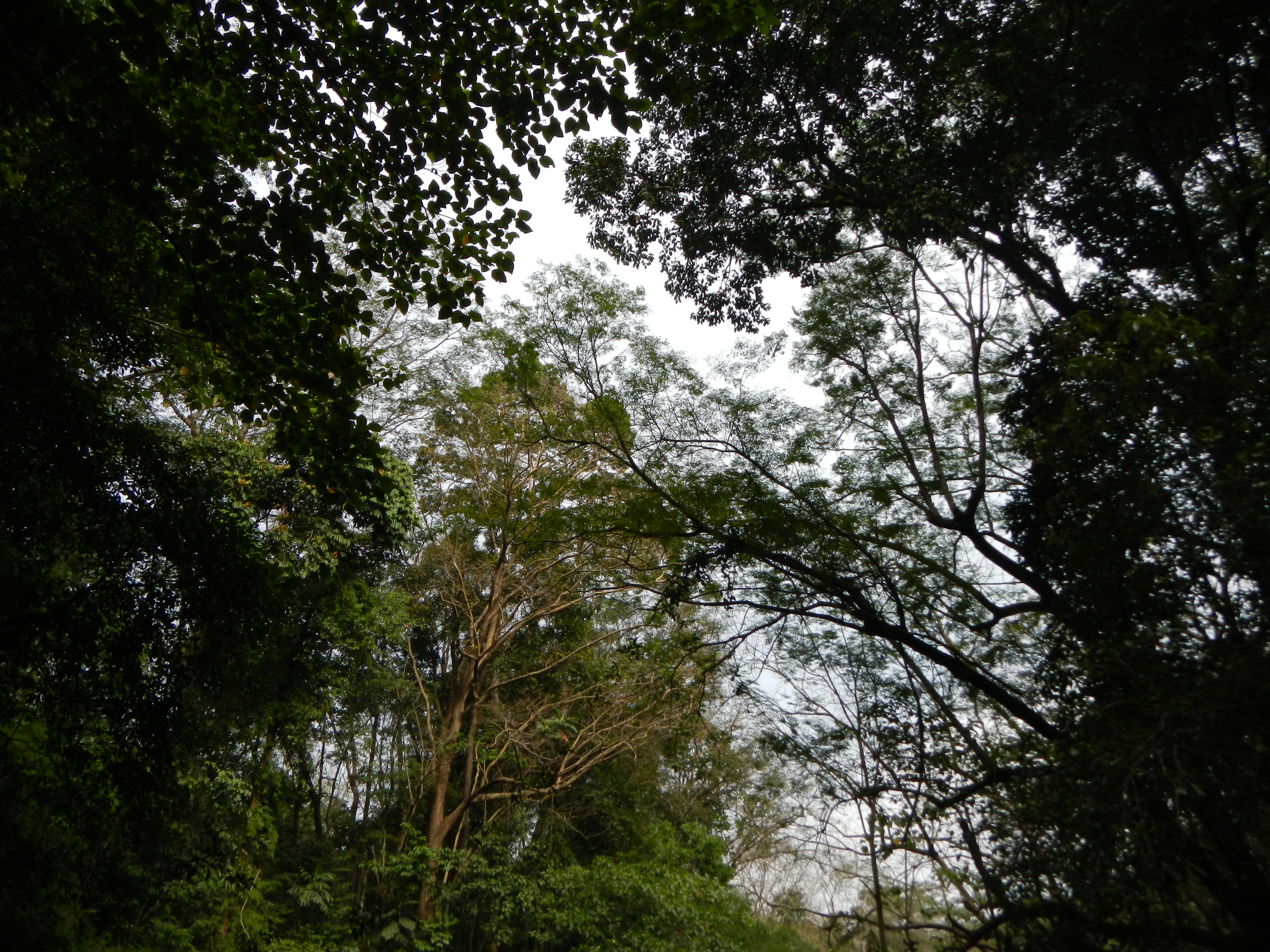
The trees

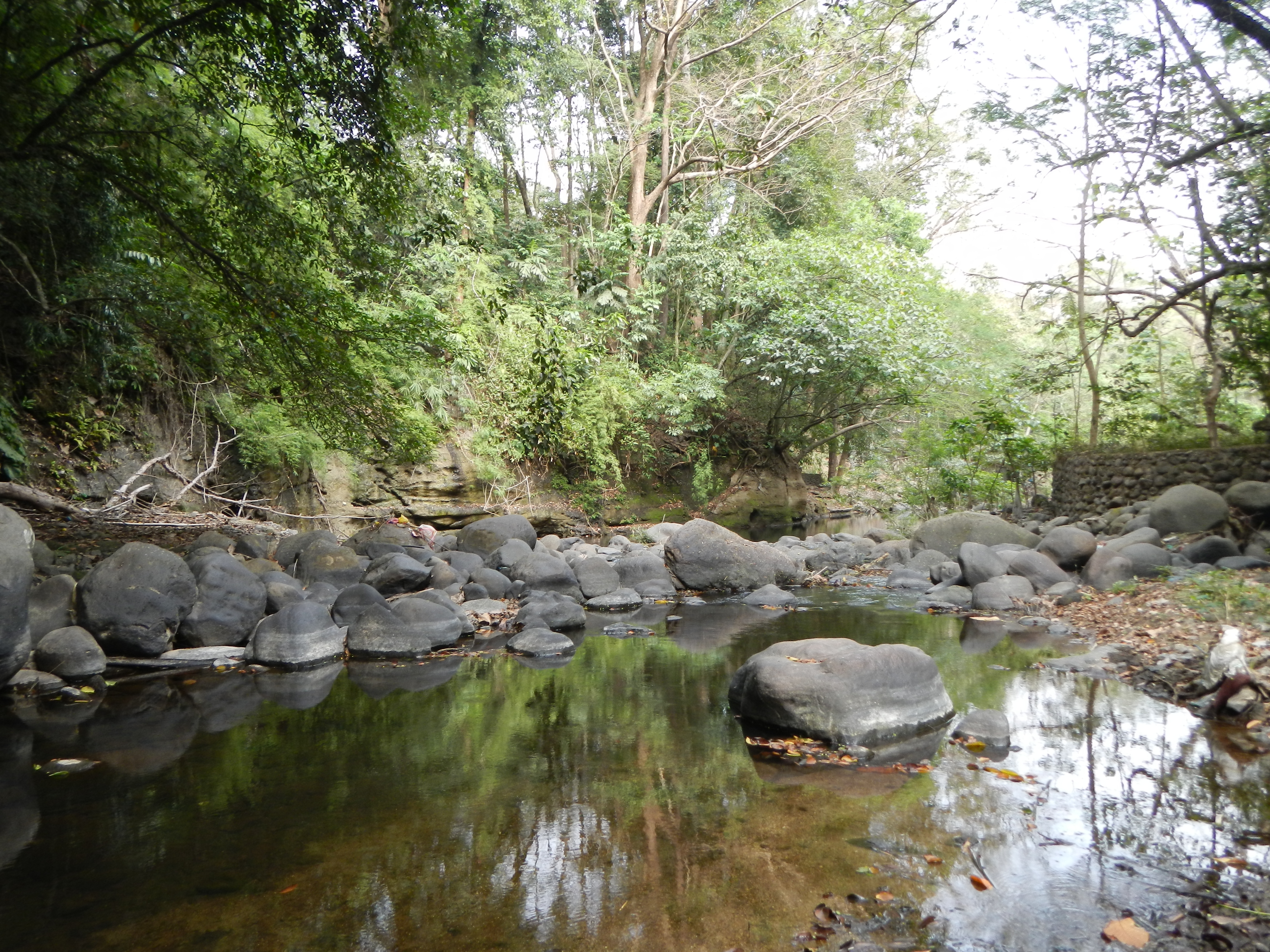
The waters

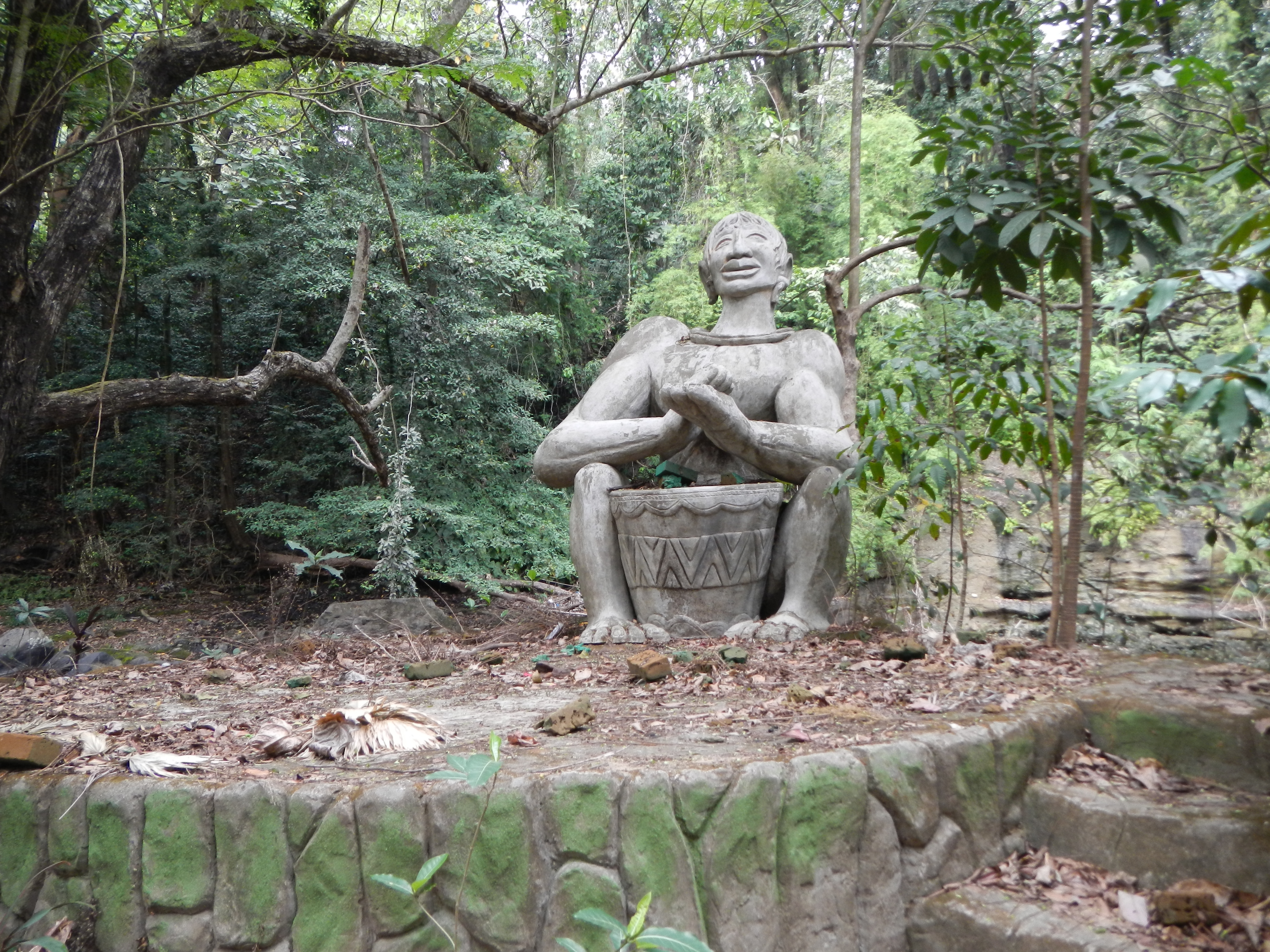
The primitive man

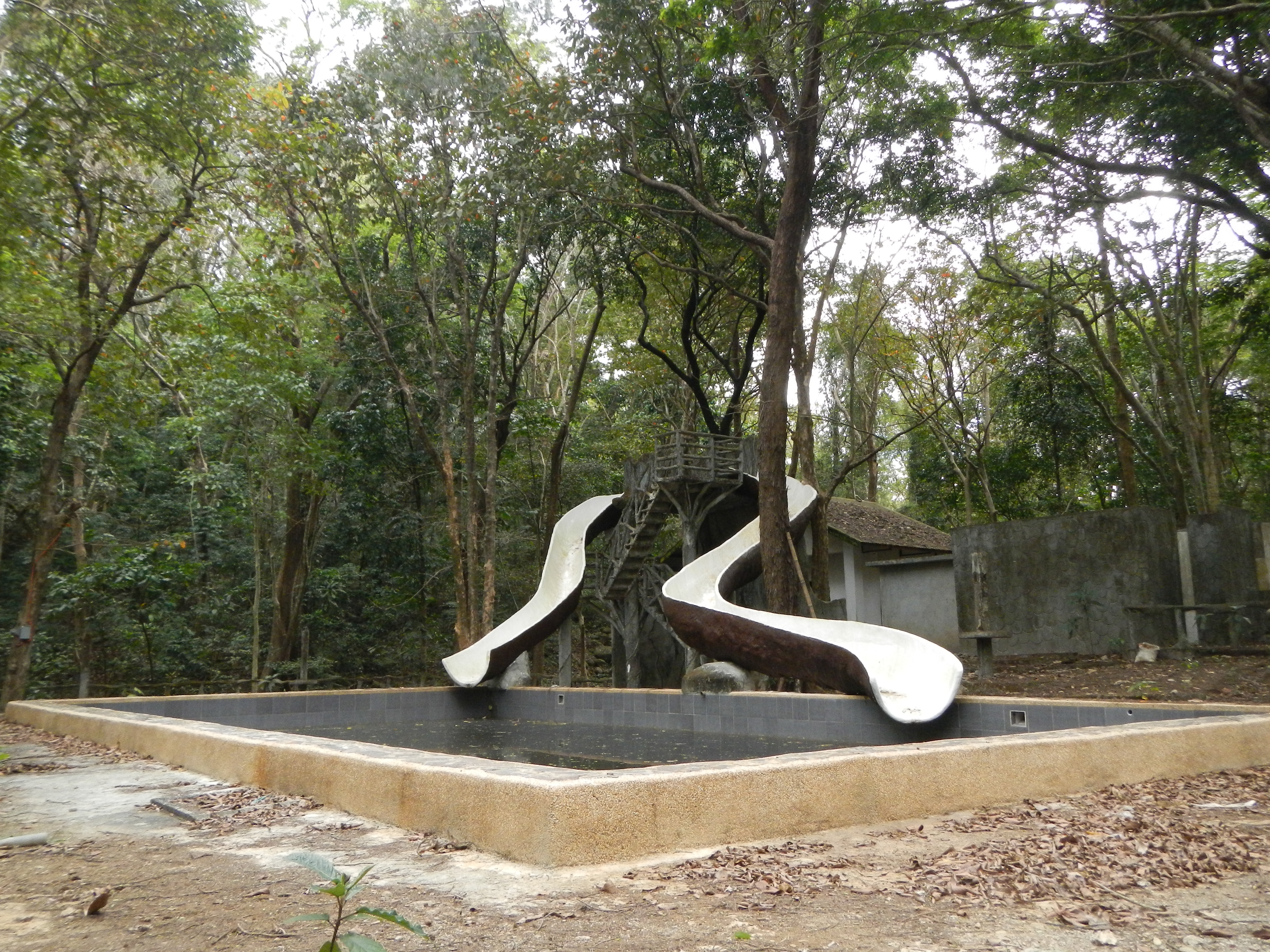
Swimming pool

== International broadcast ==
- Cambodia - It was broadcast under the title "មន្តស្នេហ៍ឧទ្យានទេព" (mont sne utyean tep) on Hang Meas HDTV.

== See also ==
- List of TV5 (Philippine TV network) original programming
