= Deathrow (film) =

- Original movie poster
- Directed by: Joel Lamangan
- Screenplay by: Ricardo Lee; Manny Palo
- Story by: Ricardo Lee; Butch Jimenez; Joel Lamangan
- Produced by: Butch Jimenez; Jimmy Duavit
- Starring: Cogie Domingo; Eddie Garcia
- Cinematography: Monino Duque
- Edited by: Kelly N. Cruz; Jess Navarro
- Music by: Ryan Cayabyab
- Production company: GMA Films
- Distributed by: GMA Films
- Release date: December 25, 2000
- Running time: 118 minutes
- Country: Philippines
- Language: Filipino

Deathrow is a 2000 Philippine crime film co-written and directed by Joel Lamangan. The film stars Cogie Domingo and Eddie Garcia. This is GMA Films' last feature film before entering a 4-year hiatus.

It was one of the entries in the 2000 Metro Manila Film Festival, where it won Best Actor, Best Production Design and Best Film Editing, among others.

== Plot ==
16-year-old Sonny Corpus, born and raised in the slums of Manila, frequently hangs out with his friends Celso, Jimmy, and Rodel, who also pressure Sonny to spend more time with them. Unbeknownst to Sonny, his friends plan to rob a house one night. During the robbery, Celso accidentally fires at the owner of the house, killing her. Police arrive at the scene and Jimmy and Rodel are killed, prompting Sonny to freeze and Celso to run. The police find Sonny at the scene and arrest him.

Sonny is detained and cross-examined, and his lawyer points out that his client is still a minor. However, he fails to show ample evidence. Although Sonny did not kill anyone during the robbery, he is found guilty of murder and subsequently sentenced to death row. After a harsh introduction to prison life during his struggle to come to terms with the court's verdict, he finds his place among the convicts.

'Mayor' Mio, a fellow inmate who holds a position of power in the prison hierarchy, attempts to recruit Sonny as a dealer for his cocaine-smuggling business. Sonny hesitantly accepts. The cocaine business is known to the jail warden Fajardo who is also an accomplice. Gabino, Mio's second-in-command, attempts to win Sonny's support as part of his secretive preparations for a coup against Mio.

Fellow inmate Lolo Sinat, a 77-year-old gangster who appears to be the most powerful and senior inmate on death row, eventually takes Sonny under his wings. He advises Sonny to stop his involvement in the drug business. When a high-ranking official visits the prison, Sonny confesses to him about the drug business. Gabino exacts revenge by giving Sonny a severe beating; he is also raped and tortured.

Sonny seeks the help of Gina, a public attorney who also handles the case of Lolo Sinat, to appeal his case. Lolo Sinat does not trust Gina, often calling her a stupid lawyer; she responds by telling him he does not know how to love. Lolo Sinat tells Sonny about his past and how he was brought to jail. The two become closer, and Lolo Sinat promises Sonny that he will help the boy so that when Lolo Sinat faces God, he could say that for once in his life, he has done something right.

With the help of Lukas, Lolo Sinat and Sonny manage to escape, but are caught the next day. Gina then tells Lolo Sinat that he will be executed the following week. With his death drawing near, the old man encourages Gina to help Sonny appeal his case. Gabino tries to rape Sonny again, but the boy fights back with a bread knife and stabs Gabino several times, killing him. Lolo Sinat covers up for Sonny. Before being brought to the lethal injection chamber, Lolo Sinat gives his old walkman to Sonny.

After several weeks, Gina's appeal for Sonny's case is successful. Celso is found and brought to justice and Sonny is released from jail.

== Cast ==
Main cast

- Cogie Domingo as Sonny Corpus
- Eddie Garcia as Lolo Sinat

Supporting cast

- Jaclyn Jose as Gina
- Ray Ventura as 'Mayor' Mio
- Pen Medina as Gabino
- Angelika dela Cruz as Sabel
- Tony Mabesa as 'Governor' Asunta
- Spanky Manikan as Fajardo
- Mon Confiado as Lukas
- Nonie Buencamino as Nardo
- Ace Espinosa as Young Lolo Sinat
- Janine Desiderio as Ruby
- Allan Paule as Cenon
- Mel Kimura as Cenon's wife
- Jim Pebanco as Lupe
- Maureen Mauricio as Sonny's aunt
- Anita Linda as robbery victim
- Joseph Izon as Celso
- Marky Alonzo as Rodel
- Randy Ramos as Jimmy
- Richard Quan as Armand
- Tessie Villarama as Judge
- James Patricks as Sonny's lawyer

== Awards and nominations ==
In the 2000 Metro Manila Film Festival, it won 2nd Best Film, Best Actor (Eddie Garcia), Best Production Design (Joey Luna), Best Film Editing (Jess Navarro and Kelly N. Cruz), Best Sound Recording (Albert Michael Idioma and Rudy Gonzales).

In the FAP Awards, it won Best Actor (Eddie Garcia), Best Editing (Jess Navarro), Best Production Design (Joey Luna) and Best Supporting Actor (Pen Medina).

In the Gawad Urian Awards, it won Best Actor (Eddie Garcia), Best Editing (Jess Navarro and Kelly N. Cruz) and Best Sound (Albert Michael Idioma and Rudy Gonzales).

It was given the Prix Du Meilleur Film Engage au Service d’une Cause (Prize for the Best Committed Film Championing a Cause) at the 23rd International Festival of Independent Films in Brussels, Belgium in 2001 for its sensitive yet realistic depiction of the plight of a juvenile delinquent on death row.

It was nominated for Golden Cairo Award in the 2001 Cairo International Film Festival. It was shown and competed in other international film festivals.

It was shown at the 2001 Toronto International Film Festival.
