= Caridad Sanchez =

Filipino actress (born 1932)

- Born: Caridad Yuson Sanchez; August 1, 1930 (age 96); Mandaue, Cebu, Philippine Islands
- Occupation: Actress
- Years active: 1958–2015
- Spouse: Vicente Babao
- Children: Cathy S. Babao; Alexander Joseph Babao
- Relatives: Julius Babao (nephew); Christine Bersola-Babao (niece-in-law)

Caridad Yuson Sanchez-Babao (born August 1, 1930) is a former Filipino actress, mostly seen on GMA Network. In 1977, she played the role of Nanay Idad in the revival TV drama series based from the very successful radio soap opera (first heard over DZRH in 1949) Gulong ng Palad as a household mother of Luisa.

== Early life and career ==
Caridad Sanchez's father, Marcos F. Sanchez, and mother, Sofia Yuson, are from Mandaue, Cebu. She comes from a big family of 15 children, and she is the youngest. She dreamt of becoming a lawyer before she became an actress.

As a professional actress she did Visayan films and then starred in many TV shows in supporting roles in the early 1960s to the 1970s. She honed her acting skills working with big stars such as Dolphy, Nida Blanca, and Fernando Poe Jr. She was later cast in bigger roles in the late 1970s. She became a TV household favorite as Nanay Edad in Gulong ng Palad, a classic radio serial turned TV soap on the old BBC 2. She then made acting comebacks in multiple sitcoms and weekly drama anthologies. She appeared as John Lloyd Cruz's grandmother in Tabing Ilog, a show for younger viewers. In 2001 she starred in Sa Puso Ko Iingatan Ka as Judy Ann Santos's grandmother and in 2003-2004 she played a major role as Joel Torre's mother in Sana'y Wala Nang Wakas on ABS-CBN. In 2005-2015 she appeared on TV shows and movies with GMA Network.

She is remembered for playing supporting roles in dramas and comedies. She is currently retired from acting.

== Personal life ==
She was married to Vicente Babao and they two had children named Cathy Babao, who was a grief educator, counselor, and columnist at the Philippine Daily Inquirer and Alexander Joseph Babao. She was widowed at the age of 47 after Vicente died from a heart attack and raised their children alone. Cathy described her parents are "both very passionate people with strong beliefs."

In 1998, she lost her four-year-old grandson, Migi, who died from heart surgery.

Sanchez is the aunt of journalist Julius Babao and the aunt-in-law of his wife, Christine Bersola-Babao.

=== Health ===
In an Instagram post on September 17, 2020, Sanchez's daughter, Cathy Babao, revealed was suffering from dementia which had been diagnosed in late 2015. However, Alexander Joseph disputed his sister's claims, explaining that Sanchez only has a "mild cognitive handicap that goes with aging" and is physically fit under his care. He also called out his sister for violating their mother's privacy.

== Filmography ==
=== Film ===
Year	Title	Role
1958	Malvarosa	Melanio's woman #1
1963	Magtiis Ka, Darling	
1964	Scout Rangers	
1967	Maruja	Petra
1968	Ngitngit ng Pitong Whistle Bomb	
1970	Wanted: Perfect Mother	Lucia
1970	Santiago!	Pilar
1971	Stardoom	
1973	Lupang Hinirang	
1984	Alyas Baby Tsina	Nena
1985	Ano ang Kulay ng Mukha ng Diyos	Aling Ceiling
1985	Menudo at Pandesal	
1987	Takot Ako, Eh!	
1987	The Untold Story of Melanie Marquez	
1988	The Untouchable Family	Ma Barker
1988	Hati Tayo sa Magdamag	Aling Pinang
1988	Kapag Napagod ang Puso	
1990	Shake, Rattle & Roll II	Manang
1991	Juan Tamad at Mister Shooli: Mongolian Barbecue	Inay Litga
1992	Hiram Na Mukha	Lola Emma
1994	Maalaala Mo Kaya: The Movie	Nena
1994	Vampira	
1995	The Flor Contemplacion Story	Flor's mother-in-law
1996	SPO4 Santiago: Sharpshooter	Jaime's mother
1997	The Sarah Balabagan Story	Sarah's aunt
1997	Calvento Files: The Movie	Greta
1998	Pusong Mamon	Nick's grandmother
1999	Sidhi	Tia Manuella
2001	Mila	Principal
2001	Bagong Buwan	Bae Farida
2004	Panaghoy sa Suba	Aunt Lahi
2006	Saan Nagtatago si Happiness?	Sotela Esteban/Tikyo's mother
2007	Ang M.O.N.A.Y. ni Mr. Shooli (Misteyks Opda Neysion Adres Yata)	
2007	Enteng Kabisote 4: Okay Ka, Fairy Ko... The Beginning of the Legend	Lola Ina Magenta
2008	Botelya	Penning

=== Television ===
Year	Title	Role	Notes
1977–1985	Gulong ng Palad	Nanay Idad	
1993	Noli Me Tangere	Dna. Victorina	
1993–1994	Kate en Boogie		
1995–2000	Bayani	Lola	
1996–1998	Calvento Files	Various	6 episodes
1997	1 for 3	Gene's mother	
1997–2004	Wansapanataym	Various	6 episodes
1999–2001	Saan Ka Man Naroroon	Cleotilde De Villa	
1999–2003	Tabing Ilog	Lola Juling	
2001–2003	Sa Puso Ko Iingatan Ka	Loleta Quevedo	
2001	Maalaala Mo Kaya		Episode: "Basket"
2003–2004	Basta't Kasama Kita		
2003–2004	Sana'y Wala Nang Wakas	Choleng	
2005	Bora	Tita Yolly	
2005	Mars Ravelo's Darna	Aling Caring	
2006	Your Song	Lola Marge	Episode: "Pers Lab"
2006	I Luv NY	Lola Juliana	
2006	Now and Forever: Dangal		
2007	Asian Treasures	Meranda / Melchora	
2007–2008	La Vendetta	Nana Meldrid	
2007–2008	MariMar	Lola Cruz Perez	
2008	Codename: Asero	Lola Bertita	
2008	E.S.P.: A Ghostly Past		
2008	E.S.P.: The Soul of Lucas		
2008	E.S.P.: The Rescue		
2009	Carlo J. Caparas' Totoy Bato	Concha Velarde	
2009–2010	Mars Ravelo's Darna	Loleng	
2010	Sine Novela: Ina, Kasusuklaman Ba Kita?	Susing Mendiola	
2010	Diva	Aretha Abdul-Ah	
2010	Dear Friend: My Stalking Heart		
2010–2011	Grazilda	Tisay	
2011	Carlo J. Caparas' Andres De Saya	Minda Taguyod	
2011	Time of My Life	Becky	
2011–2012	Ruben Marcelino's Kokak	Berta	
2012	One True Love	Lola Matilda Bulaong	
2013	Pahiram ng Sandali	Salve Umali	
2013	Mga Basang Sisiw	Lagring	
2013	Genesis	Minerva	
2014	The Borrowed Wife	Ceiling	
2014	Rhodora X	Esperanza Castaneda	
2014	Magpakailanman: Dalawang Kasarian	Deling	
2015	Beautiful Strangers	Vicencia	
