= Filipinos in the United Arab Emirates =

Total population
- 679,819

Regions with significant populations
- Abu Dhabi, Al Ain, Dubai

Languages
- Tagalog or other languages of the Philippines, English, Arabic

Religion
- Roman Catholicism or other Christian denominations, Islam

Related ethnic groups
- Filipino people, Overseas Filipinos

Filipinos in the United Arab Emirates are migrants or descendants of the Filipinos living in the United Arab Emirates. 679,819 Filipinos live in the UAE, of which 450,000 live in Dubai, and they form 6.1% of the whole UAE population, and they form 21.3% of the population of Dubai. Dubai is home to the largest population of Filipinos in the UAE, followed by Abu Dhabi and Al Ain. In 2007, Filipinos in the UAE sent more than US$500 million in remittances back to the Philippines.

== Filipino workers ==
Filipinos in the United Arab Emirates are primarily migrant overseas workers employed in the architecture, construction, cargo shipping design engineering, energy, information technology, marketing, medical, real estate, retail, telecommunications, and tourism sectors or as domestic helpers. The Philippine Department of Labor and Employment also has two Philippine Overseas Labor Offices (POLOs) in the UAE, in Abu Dhabi and Dubai. These offices, as well as agreements between the Filipino and UAE governments, have set the monthly minimum salary for OFW's at US$400. Because of the high number of Filipinos in the UAE, OFW's have called more direct flights from the UAE to the Philippines.

== Population decline ==
The 2008 financial crisis took a toll on the working Filipino population in the United Arab Emirates, with 3,000 Filipino workers losing their jobs in December 2008 alone. The overall population shrank by 20% at the end of 2008 as compared to the end of 2007. The Embassy of the Philippines in the UAE asked laid-off Filipinos to register, because of the possibility of job openings in nearby Qatar. However, the decline could also be attributed to new visa and passport requirements that the government of the UAE instituted midway through 2008, affecting up to 20,000 Filipinos. Those with expired visas were stranded on the Iranian island of Kish, and at Al Buraimi, Oman near the Oman/UAE border. 300 Filipinos had fled to the Philippines because of the stranded Filipinos and 65 Filipinos received tickets free from the Consulate of the Philippines. In 2024, they constitute 6.8% of the UAE’s total population, which means approximately 700,000 individuals. Among them, around 450,000 Filipinos reside in Dubai alone, representing roughly 21.3% of the emirate’s total population.

== See also ==
- Philippines-United Arab Emirates relations
- Filipino diaspora
- Immigration to the United Arab Emirates
- The Philippine School, Dubai
