= Mister Mo, Lover Ko =

Philippine romantic comedy film

- Directed by: Joel Lamangan
- Written by: Lualhati Bautista
- Produced by: Jesse M. Ejercito; Wilson Tieng
- Starring: Glydel Mercado; Gary Estrada; Eddie Gutierrez; Elizabeth Oropesa
- Cinematography: Romulo Araojo
- Edited by: Jess Navarro
- Music by: Dennis Garcia
- Production company: Crown Seven Ventures
- Distributed by: Solar Films
- Release date: June 23, 1999
- Running time: 105 minutes
- Country: Philippines
- Language: Filipino

Mister Mo, Lover Ko is a 1999 Philippine romantic comedy film directed by Joel Lamangan. The film stars Glydel Mercado, Gary Estrada, Eddie Gutierrez and Elizabeth Oropesa. It is a remake of the 1975 film Mister Mo, Lover Boy Ko, where Oropesa was among the leading stars. It was one of the entries in the 1999 Manila Film Festival.

The film is streaming online on YouTube.

== Cast ==
- Glydel Mercado as Maita
- Gary Estrada as Noel
- Eddie Gutierrez as Ford
- Elizabeth Oropesa as Melody
- Samantha Lopez as Jenny
- Danny Ramos as Reagan
- Dexter Doria as Dra. Dumalaga
- Luz Valdez as Aling Andrea
- Sheila Marie Rodriguez as Dina
- Dedes Whitake as Gemma
- Jessette Prospero as Mrs. Calixto
- Tessie Villarama as Dina's Mother-in-Law
- Jerry O'Hara as Maita's Father
- Tony Mabesa as Priest
- Boots Basi as Alice
- Joanne Alano as Cory
- Gerald Ejercito as Gerry
- J.B. Villavert as John
- Richard Quan as Aries
- Jim Pebanco as Red
- Ogie Francisco as Ogie
- J.R. Rosales as JR

== Awards ==
Year	Awards	Category	Recipient	Result	Ref.
1999	8th Manila Film Festival	Best Supporting Actor	Gary Estrada	Won	
