= The Flor Contemplacion Story =

1995 biographical crime thriller drama film by Joel C. Lamangan

- DVD cover of the film
- Directed by: Joel C. Lamangan
- Screenplay by: Ricky Lee; Bonifacio Ilagan
- Story by: Efren Contemplacion
- Produced by: Vic R. Del Rosario Jr.; William C. Leary
- Starring: Nora Aunor; Amy Austria; Jacklyn Jose
- Cinematography: Romy Vitug
- Edited by: Joyce Bernal; Edgardo Vinarao
- Music by: Vehnee Saturno
- Production company: Viva Films
- Distributed by: Viva Films
- Release date: June 7, 1995
- Running time: 122 minutes
- Country: Philippines
- Language: Filipino
- Box office: ₱70 million

The Flor Contemplacion Story is a 1995 Philippine biographical crime thriller drama film directed by Joel C. Lamangan from a screenplay written by Ricky Lee and Bonifacio Ilagan, based on a story supplied by Efren Contemplacion. Starring Nora Aunor, the film tells the story of a Filipina domestic helper who was hanged in Singapore for allegedly killing her fellow maid and was chronicled in a film which operates on various personal, social, and political levels.

A film produced by Viva Films that was both critically acclaimed and controversial, The Flor Contemplacion Story brought Nora Aunor numerous citations for her intense portrayal as the fallen heroine of the story. It was later screened and exhibited in different film festivals around the world, particularly at the 19th Cairo International Film Festival where the film won the Golden Pyramid Award and its lead star, Nora Aunor, won the Princess Pataten Award for Best Actress.

== Plot ==
Flor (Aunor) suffers from poverty and decides to work as a domestic helper in Singapore, thinking it will solve her problems. Unlike many other servants, she is well-treated by her employers. However, in 1995, she was arrested and charged with killing her fellow Filipina, Delia Maga, and the little boy she was caring for. After a hasty trial, the Singaporean government finds Flor guilty and sentences her to death by hanging.

Flor's predicament brings an outpouring of sympathy from Filipinos, who refuse to believe her guilt. There was a national appeal for clemency and a re-investigation to be done. The office of the President appealed to the Singaporean Government; however, the Singapore Government remained steadfast with their decision, and Flor was executed in March 1995.

== Cast ==
- Nora Aunor as Flor Contemplacion, a domestic helper who was sentenced to death by the Singaporean government
- Julio Diaz as Efren Contemplacion, the husband of the executed
- Jacklyn Jose as Neneng
- Ian De Leon as Xandrex Contemplacion
- Vina Morales as Russel Contemplacion
- Jon-Jon Contemplacion as himself
- Joel Contemplacion as himself
- Tony Mabesa as Roberto Romulo, the secretary of Department of Foreign Affairs
- Ali Sotto as Alicia Ramos, the Philippine ambassador to Singapore
- Rita Avila as Evangeline Parale/Virginia Parumog
- Amy Austria as Delia Maga, Flor's fellow countryman who also works as a domestic helper
- Charito Solis as Lydia Montilla
- Gloria Sevilla as Flor's mother
- Caridad Sanchez as Flor's mother-in-law
- Allan Paule as Gilbert, Flor's nephew
- Ronaldo Valdez as Atty. Romeo Capulong
- Ara Mina as Evelyn Contemplacion
- Anthony Cortez as Allan
- Bennette Ignacio as Nicholas Huang
- Bob Soler as Mayor Vicente Amante
- Jim Pebanco as Poe Gratela
- Eugene Domingo as News Anchor

== Production ==
Over a week after Flor Contemplacion's execution on March 17, 1995, Viva Films was already negotiating with Romeo Capulong, the lawyer representing Contemplacion's family, for the film rights to her story, with Nora Aunor cast to portray Contemplacion in the anticipated film. On April 5, 1995, Viva Films president Teresita Cruz announced that the studio has officially acquired the film rights to Contemplacion's story, which cost up to ₱2 million. Screenwriter Ricky Lee pushed himself to finish the film's screenplay by his set deadline of April 15 after the rights were acquired. Scenes from the film were shot in Pagsanjan, Laguna.

== Music ==
The theme song in the film is "Kahit Konting Awa", which was composed by Vehnee Saturno and interpreted by Aunor herself.

== Critical response ==
The film received positive reviews, especially for Aunor's acting.

== Accolades ==
=== International ===
Year	Group	Category	Nominee	Result
1995	Cairo International Film Festival	Princess Pataten Statue for Best Actress	Nora Aunor	Won
1995	Cairo International Film Festival	Golden Pyramid	Joel Lamangan	Won

=== Philippines ===
Year	Award-giving body	Category	Nominee	Result
1996	Filipino Academy of Movie Arts and Sciences Awards (FAMAS)	Circle of Excellence	Nora Aunor	Won
1996	Filipino Academy of Movie Arts and Sciences Awards (FAMAS)	Best Musical Score	Vehnee Saturno	Won
1996	Filipino Academy of Movie Arts and Sciences Awards (FAMAS)	Best Director	Joel Lamangan	Nominated
1996	Filipino Academy of Movie Arts and Sciences Awards (FAMAS)	Best Picture		Nominated
1996	Filipino Academy of Movie Arts and Sciences Awards (FAMAS)	Best Supporting Actress	Jaclyn Jose	Nominated
1996	Filipino Academy of Movie Arts and Sciences Awards (FAMAS)	Best Screenplay	Ricardo Lee; Bonifacio Ilagan	Nominated
1996	Filipino Academy of Movie Arts and Sciences Awards (FAMAS)	Best Sound	Ramon Reyes	Nominated
1996	Filipino Academy of Movie Arts and Sciences Awards (FAMAS)	Best Movie Theme Song	"Kahit Konting Awa" by Vehnee Saturno	Nominated
1996	Catholic Mass Media Awards	Film of the Year	The Flor Contemplacion Story	Won
1996	Gawad Urian Awards (Manunuri ng Pelikulang Pilipino)	Best Picture		Nominated
1996	Gawad Urian Awards (Manunuri ng Pelikulang Pilipino)	Best Director	Joel Lamangan	Won
1996	Gawad Urian Awards (Manunuri ng Pelikulang Pilipino)	Best Actress	Nora Aunor	Won
1996	Gawad Urian Awards (Manunuri ng Pelikulang Pilipino)	Best Supporting Actress	Jaclyn Jose	Won
1996	Gawad Urian Awards (Manunuri ng Pelikulang Pilipino)	Best Supporting Actress	Rita Avila	Nominated
1996	Gawad Urian Awards (Manunuri ng Pelikulang Pilipino)	Best in Cinematography	Romeo Vitug	Nominated
1996	Gawad Urian Awards (Manunuri ng Pelikulang Pilipino)	Best Music	Vehnee Saturno	Nominated
1996	Gawad Urian Awards (Manunuri ng Pelikulang Pilipino)	Best Sound	Ramon Reyes	Nominated
1996	Luna Award (Film Academy of the Philippines)	Best Picture		Won
1996	Luna Award (Film Academy of the Philippines)	Best Director	Joel Lamangan	Won
1996	Luna Award (Film Academy of the Philippines)	Best Actress	Nora Aunor	Won
1996	Luna Award (Film Academy of the Philippines)	Best Supporting Actress	Jaclyn Jose	Won
1996	Luna Award (Film Academy of the Philippines)	Best Adapted Screenplay	Ricky Lee	Won
1996	Luna Award (Film Academy of the Philippines)	Best Editing	Edgardo Vinarao	Nominated
1996	Luna Award (Film Academy of the Philippines)	Best Original Song	"Kahit Konting Awa" by Vehnee Saturno	Nominated
1996	Luna Award (Film Academy of the Philippines)	Best Sound	Ramon Reyes	Won
1996	Star Awards for Movies (Philippine Movie Press Club)	Best Actress	Nora Aunor	Won
1996	Star Awards for Movies (Philippine Movie Press Club)	Best Director	Joel Lamangan	Won
1996	Star Awards for Movies (Philippine Movie Press Club)	Best Picture		Won
1996	Star Awards for Movies (Philippine Movie Press Club)	Best Supporting Actress	Jaclyn Jose	Won
1996	Star Awards for Movies (Philippine Movie Press Club)	Best Movie Theme Song	"Kahit Konting Awa" by Vehnee Saturno	Won
1996	Star Awards for Movies (Philippine Movie Press Club)	Best Musical Score	Vehnee Saturno	Won
1996	Young Critics Circle	Best Performance by Male or Female, Adult or Child, Individual or Ensemble in Leading or Supporting Role	Nora Aunor	Won
1996	Young Critics Circle	Best Achievement in Cinematography and Visual Design	Romeo Vitug (director of photography); Manny Morfe (production designer)	Won
1996	Young Critics Circle	Best Film		Nominated
1996	Young Critics Circle	Best Performance by Male or Female, Adult or Child, Individual or Ensemble in Leading or Supporting Role	Jaclyn Jose	Nominated
1996	Young Critics Circle	Best Screenplay	Ricky Lee	Nominated

== List of festivals where the film was competed or exhibited ==
- 1995 - Toronto International Film Festival
- 1995 - Competition Film, 19th Cairo International Film Festival
  - Winner, Golden Pyramid Award (Best Picture)
  - Princess Pataten Statue Best Actress, Nora Aunor
- 1996 - Human Rights Watch International Film Festival New York, June 13
- 1996 - Pan Asian Film and Video Festival, April 12–26
- 1996 - 3rd Southeast Asian Film Festival
- 1996 - Fukuoka International Film Festival, September 13–23, Feature Film: Philippine Films Collection
- 1996 - Hawaii International Film Festival, November
- 1996 - Pusan International Film Festival, South Korea
- 1996 - Dublin Film Festival, Ireland
- 2003 - Philippine Film Festival, Fukuoka City, Japan, November 1–16

== See also ==
- List of films about Overseas Filipino Workers
