= Joel Lamangan =

Filipino director, actor, and comedian

- Occupations: Actor, director, comedian
- Years active: 1982–present
- Awards: Golden Pyramid Award - Cairo Film Festival; 1995 The Flor Contemplacion Story

Joel Lamangan is a Filipino film director, television director, actor, and comedian. His award-winning films include The Flor Contemplacion Story, Sidhi, Deathrow, Hubog, Aishte Imasu 1941, Blue Moon and Mano Po. As an actor, Lamangan is best known for portraying the villain-turned-funny-antihero Roda in the Kapamilya Channel teleserye FPJ's Batang Quiapo.

On August 19, 2008, Lamangan directed his first indie film Walang Kawala produced by DMV Entertainment. It stars Polo Ravales and Joseph Bitangcol, with the special participation of Jean Garcia. Joel also directs Obra and will soon start shooting Desperadas 2. He started production for the next Sine Novela: Una Kang Naging Akin starring Angelika dela Cruz, Wendell Ramos, and Maxene Magalona.

In the 2013 elections, he ran as congressman for Cavite's 1st District under the Lakas–UNA–Partido Magdalo. However, he backed out of the race.

In 2013, Lamangan was named as the artistic director of Gantimpala Theater Foundation. Lamangan directed an original musical titled Katipunan: Mga Anak ng Bayan which starred Sandino Martin and Anna Fegi. The show toured in August and September 2013 around provinces of Manila to celebrate the 150th anniversary of the birth of Philippine hero, Andres Bonifacio.

Lamangan is a member of the Directors' Guild of the Philippines.

Lamangan is a member of the international Order of DeMolay from Baja Chapter, in Cavite City. He was conferred with the highest honor being a DeMolay to the rank of Legion of Honor on November 14, 2015, by the Grand Master Victor Antonio T. Espejo of the Supreme Council Order of DeMolay Philippines for outstanding leadership in his field of endeavor, for service to humanity, for success in fraternal life, including adult service to the Order of DeMolay. The Supreme Council Order of DeMolay is an appendant body of Freemasonry.

== Activism ==
Lamangan has been an activist since the 1960s. In the mid-1960s, he formed a Kabataang Makabayan chapter in Cavite City, where he once led a jeepney strike. He was imprisoned and tortured during martial law in 1973 and 1977. He was among the organizers of the ML50 campaign in 2022, through which a series of activities were held to commemorate the 50th anniversary of the declaration of martial law under the dictatorship of Ferdinand Marcos.

He has directed a number of films that depicted social and political conditions in the Philippines. Sigwa (Rage) in 2010 depicted the life of activists who had taken part in the First Quarter Storm. Deadline:The Reign of Impunity in 2011 depicted killings of media people. His 2009 film Dukot, which depicted the plight of desaparecidos, was screened in the US, Canada, and Hong Kong with the help of human rights organizations. The film was also screened at the Montreal World Film Festival.

== Filmography ==
=== Film ===
==== As director ====
Year	Title	Notes	Ref:
1991	Darna		
1992	Hiram na Mukha		
1992	Ngayon at Kailanman		
1993	Ikaw		
1994	Kadenang Bulaklak		
1994	Anghel Na Walang Langit		
1994	Kapantay Ay Langit		
1994	Pangako ng Kahapon		
1995	Silakbo		
1995	The Flor Contemplacion Story		
1995	Muling Umawit ang Puso		
1996	Bakit May Kahapon Pa?		
1997	The Sarah Balabagan Story		
1998	Pusong Mamon	co-director with Eric Quizon	
1999	Sidhi		
1999	Warat: Bibigay Ka Ba?		
1999	Bulaklak ng Maynila		
2000	Deathrow		
2000	Abandonada		
2001	Hubog		
2001	Mila		
2002	Mano Po		
2002	Bahid		
2003	Filipinas		
2003	Ang Huling Birhen sa Lupa		
2003	Walang Kapalit		
2004	So... Happy Together		
2004	Aishite Imasu 1941: Mahal Kita		
2004	Mano Po III: My Love		
2004	Sabel		
2004	I Will Survive		
2005	Ako Legal Wife (Mano Po 4?)		
2006	Mano Po 5: Gua Ai Di		
2006	ZsaZsa Zaturnnah Ze Moveeh		
2006	Pacquiao: The Movie		
2006	Manay Po		
2006	Blue Moon		
2007	Bahay Kubo: A Pinoy Mano Po!		
2007	Desperadas		
2007	Silip		
2007	Happy Hearts		
2008	Desperadas 2		
2008	Walang Kawala		
2008	Manay Po 2: Overload		
2009	Mano Po 6: A Mother's Love		
2009	I Luv Dreamguyz		
2009	Heavenly Touch		
2009	Fuschia		
2009	Dukot		
2009	Sagrada Familia		
2009	When I Met U		
2010	Sigwa		
2010	Mamarazzi		
2011	Patikul		
2012	The Mommy Returns		
2012	Migrante		
2013	Menor de Edad		
2013	The Bride and the Lover		
2013	Burgos		
2013	Lihis		
2014	Hustisya		
2015	Your Place or Mine?		
2015	Felix Manalo		
2016	Fruits N' Vegetables: Mga Bulakboleros		
2016	Ang Lalakeng Nangarap na Maging Vilma Santos		
2016	Flashmob Romance		
2016	That Thing Called Tanga Na		
2016	Sekyu		
2016	Siphayo		
2017	This Time I'll Be Sweeter		
2017	Bes and the Beshies		
2017	Bhoy Intsik		
2017	Foolish Love		
2018	Rainbow's Sunset		
2018	The Significant Other		
2020	Hindi tayo pwede		
2020	Isa Pang Bahaghari		
2021	Anak ng Macho Dancer		
2021	Bully'Kang: The First Adventure		
2021	Silab		
2021	Lockdown		
2021	Bekis on the Run		
2021	Deception		
2022	Moonlight Butterfly		
2022	Island of Desire		
2022	Biyak		
2022	Walker		
2022	Girl Friday		
2022	Madawag ang landas patungong pag-asa		
2022	My Father, Myself		
2023	Oras de Peligro		
2023	Fall Guy	Also co-writer with Troy Espiritu.	
2023	Lola Magdalena		
2024	Apo Hapon		
2025	Jackstone 5		

==== As actor ====
Year	Title	Role	Ref:
1984	Working Girls	Khris	
1988	Kumander Dante		
1990	Kasalanan Bang Sambahin Ka?	Pocholo	
2000	Markova: Comfort Gay	Councilor Justo Justo	
2018	School Service		
2025	Jackstone 5	Naldo	

=== Television ===
==== As director ====
Year	Title
1999–2000	Liwanag ng Hatinggabi
2000	Maynila
2002–2003	Kung Mawawala Ka
2003	Narito ang Puso Ko
2005	Vietnam Rose
2007	Asian Treasures (co-director)
2007	Sine Novela: Sinasamba Kita
2007–2008	Sine Novela: Pasan Ko ang Daigdig
2008	Babangon Ako't Dudurugin Kita
2008	Sine Novela: Una Kang Naging Akin
2009	Sine Novela: Paano Ba ang Mangarap?
2009	Adik Sa'Yo
2009–2010	Ikaw Sana
2010	Kahit Minsan Lang
2010	Sine Novela: Basahang Ginto
2010	Beauty Queen
2011	Magic Palayok
2011	Pahiram ng Isang Ina
2012	Valiente
2012	Enchanted Garden
2013	Madam Chairman
2016	Bakit Manipis ang Ulap?
2018	Onanay
2018	Pamilya Roces
2020	Beauty Queens
2021	Tadhana

==== As actor ====
Year	Title	Role	Notes
2016	Pepito Manaloto	Arci Angeles	Guest Role
2023–2026	FPJ's Batang Quiapo	Rodolfo "Roda" Alcantara	Supporting Role / Antagonist / Protagonist

== Awards and nominations ==
FAP Awards
Year	Category	Nominated Work(s)	Result
1995	Best Director	Pangako ng Kahapon	Won
1996	Best Director	The Flor Contemplacion Story	Won
2000	Best Director	Bulaklak ng Maynila	Won
2005	Best Director	Aishite imasu(Mahal kita) 1941	Won
2006	Best Director	Blue Moon	Won
2008	Best Director	Silip	Nominated
2011	Best Director	Sagrada Familia	Nominated
2016	Best Director	Felix Manalo	Nominated

Metro Manila Film Festival
Year	Category	Nominated Work(s)	Result
1995	Best Director	Muling Umawit ang Puso	Won
2002	Best Director	Mano Po	Won
2009	Best Director	Mano Po 6: A Mother's Love	Won
2022	Best Director	My Father, Myself	Nominated

Cairo International Film Festival
Year	Category	Nominated Work(s)	Result
1995	Golden Pyramid Award	The Flor Contemplation Story	Won
1997	Golden Pyramid Award	Bakit may kahapon pa?	Nominated
2001	Golden Pyramid Award	Deathrow	Nominated

Gawad Urian Awards
Year	Category	Nominated Work(s)	Result
2007	Best Direction	ZsaZsa Zaturnah Ze Moveeh	Nominated
2015	Best Supporting Actor	Violator	Nominated
2018	Best Direction	Bhoy Intsik	Nominated
2019	Best Supporting Actor	School Service	Won

== Personal life ==
Lamangan's mother died at childbirth. He spent his childhood in Cavite City with his grandparents Francisco, a Magdalo and US constable and Juanita. His father was the sole son. He has 15 half-brothers and half-sisters, all US military members. He was imprisoned for 2 years in Bicutan.

Lamangan’s partner of 3 decades is actor Jim Pebanco. The two first met in the 1980s.

In December 2022, Lamangan underwent a successful triple coronary artery bypass surgery at the Makati Medical Center.
