= Philippines–United Arab Emirates relations =

- Philippines: United Arab Emirates

Philippines–United Arab Emirates relations are the bilateral relations of the Republic of the Philippines and the United Arab Emirates.

== History ==
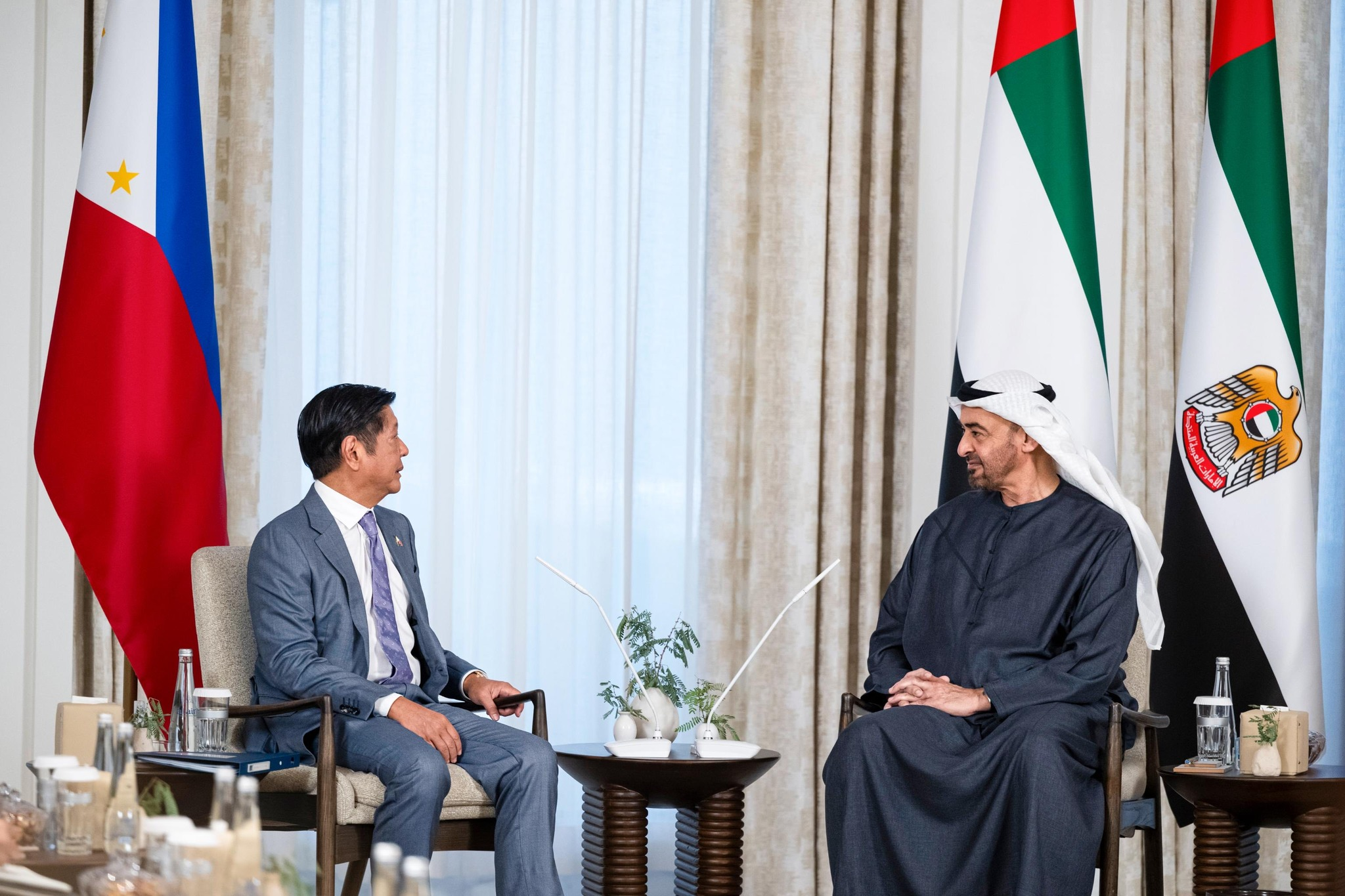
Presidents Bongbong Marcos and Mohamed bin Zayed Al Nahyan in Abu Dhabi, 26 November 2024

The Philippine Embassy in Abu Dhabi in the United Arab Emirates formally opened on June 17, 1980.

== Economic relations ==
The United Arab Emirates is dependent on expatriate workers, with a significant number of them being Filipinos. The UAE is the second top destination for Overseas Filipino Workers, after Saudi Arabia. There are about 500,000-600,000 Filipinos in the Emirates. Of all Filipino workers in the UAE, 60 percent are classified as professional, 25 percent are semi-skilled and 15 percent are unskilled. As efforts to expand labor relations the UAE is prospecting in areas of highly skilled labor, agriculture and environment studies. Total trade between the Philippines and the UAE increased to $1.61 billion in 2010 from $1 billion in 2009.

The UAE is ranked 16th among the Philippines' trading partners in 2009, 14th largest import partner and 21st largest export partner. On the same year the UAE was the Philippines' 2nd import partner and 1st export partner in the Middle East. 90% of the Philippines' import from the UAE are petroleum products. The UAE, particularly Abu Dhabi, serves as a transit hub for the Philippines export products, many of which enter duty-free to other countries in the Middle East.

On January 13, 2026, the Philippines and the UAE signed a Comprehensive Economic Partnership Agreement during president Bongbong Marcos' visit to Abu Dhabi, marking the first free trade agreement between the Philippines and a Middle Eastern country.

== Political and Security relations ==
The UAE supported peace talks between the Government of the Philippines and the Moro National Liberation Front which led to a final peace agreement signed in Manila on September 2, 1996. The UAE also supported the Philippines' bid for observer status in the Organisation of Islamic Cooperation and advised the Philippines to also get support from other member countries which remained neutral to the Philippines' bid.

== Resident diplomatic missions ==
- the Philippines has an embassy in Abu Dhabi and a consulate-general in Dubai.
- the United Arab Emirates has an embassy in Manila.

== See also ==
- Foreign relations of the Philippines
- Foreign relations of the United Arab Emirates
