= Doll (disambiguation) =

A doll is a model of a human being, often a children's toy.

Doll or The Doll may also refer to:

== Film and television ==
- The Doll (1911 film) (Romanian: Păpușa), a Romanian silent film; see Cinema of Romania
- The Doll (1919 film), a German silent film
- The Doll (1968 film), a Polish drama
- The Doll, a 1973 Italian TV movie for the Door into Darkness series
- The Doll (2015 film), a Chinese horror film
- The Doll (TV series), a 2026 Netflix miniseries
- "The Doll" (Amazing Stories), a 1986 episode
- "The Doll" (Seinfeld), a 1996 episode of the TV sitcom Seinfeld
- "Doll" (Not Going Out), a 2025 television episode
- "Doll", season 2 premiere episode of Servant (TV Series)

== Literature ==
- Doll (manga), a 1998 science fiction manga
- The Doll (Prus novel), an 1890 novel by Bolesław Prus
- The Doll: A Portrait of My Mother, a 2015 novel by Ismail Kadare
- The Doll (Stevens novel), a 2013 novel by Taylor Stevens
- Summer of the Seventeenth Doll, a 1955 play by Ray Lawler

== Music ==
- Doll (band), a Canadian punk rock/new grunge band
- The Doll (band), a punk rock/new wave band from London, England
- New York Dolls, a hard rock band from New York
- Doll, an album by Keiko Matsui
- The Doll, a 2014 music album by director/composer Dante Tomaselli
- Doll, an album by Kevin Cahoon and Ghetto Cowboy 2006
- "Doll", a song composed by Foo Fighters, from their 1997 album The Colour and the Shape
- "Doll" (song), a song by the Japanese pop rock band Scandal

== People ==
- Doll (surname)
- Angie the Talking Doll, a character from You Can't Do That on Television
- Baby Doll (wrestler), American professional wrestler
- California Doll, a female professional wrestler from the Gorgeous Ladies of Wrestling
- Dolly Van Doll (1938–2025), Italian trans vedette, entrepreneur, and artist
- Doll, one of the side characters from the webseries Murder Drones (2021–2024)

== Other uses ==
- Doll (locomotive), based in Bedfordshire, England
- Doll, Highland, crofting township and rural village in Scotland
- Slang term for a depressant (type of drug), as in the American novel Valley of the Dolls
- Doll, an affectionate term for transgender women, as in Protect the Dolls

== See also ==
- Dolls (disambiguation)
- Dollmaker (disambiguation)
