= 2nd Miracle in Cell No. 7 (2026 film) =

- Directed by: Nuel Crisostomo Naval
- Screenplay by: Mel Mendoza-del Rosario
- Based on: 2nd Miracle in Cell No. 7 (2024) by Herwin Novianto
- Starring: Aga Muhlach; Xia Vigor; Jodi Sta. Maria
- Production company: Viva Films
- Distributed by: Viva Films
- Release date: December 25, 2026
- Country: Philippines
- Language: Filipino

2nd Miracle in Cell No. 7 is an upcoming Philippine drama film directed by Nuel Crisostomo Naval. It is a prequel to the 2019 film Miracle in Cell No. 7.

== Cast ==
- Aga Muhlach as Joselito "Lito" Gopez, a mentally impaired man who was sent to prison for allegedly being involved in the death of a government official's daughter.
- Xia Vigor as Yesha Marie Gopez, Lito's daughter who was snuck into the prison in the first film's story. Vigor is now a teenager, formerly playing the role of Yesha as a ten-year old in original film released in 2019.
- Jodi Sta. Maria as Angela, Lito's wife and Yesha's mother. A new character that was not depicted in the first film. Muhlach proposed Sta. Maria to be his leading lady when the project was pitched to him.

2nd Miracle in Cell No. 7 will also include Joel Torre, Mon Confiado, and Jansen Magpusao.

== Production ==
2nd Miracle in Cell No. 7 is film produced under Viva Films and serves primarily as a prequel to the 2019 film Miracle in Cell No. 7, although some parts occurred after the events depicted in the first film. The upcoming 2nd Miracle in Cell No. 7 film is an adaptation of the 2024 Indonesian original prequel of the same name. The original South Korean film, Miracle in Cell No. 7 by Lee Hwan-kyung was released in 2013.

Nuel Crisostomo Naval and Mel del Rosario reprises their roles as director and screenplay writer respectively.

== Release ==
2nd Miracle in Cell No. 7 will premiere in cinemas in the Philippines on December 25, 2026, as one of the official entries of the 52nd Metro Manila Film Festival.
