= Miracle in Cell No. 7 (disambiguation) =

Miracle in Cell No. 7 is a 2013 South Korean film.

Miracle in Cell No. 7 may refer to the following remakes:

- Miracle in Cell No. 7 (2019 Philippine film)
- Miracle in Cell No. 7 (2019 Turkish film)
- Miracle in Cell No. 7 (2022 film), an Indonesian film directed by Hanung Bramantyo
