= Puto (TV series) =

2021 Philippine comedy drama series

- Title card
- Genre: Fantasy comedy
- Based on: Puto (1987) by Leroy Salvador
- Directed by: Raynier Brizuela
- Starring: Herbert Bautista; McCoy de Leon
- Opening theme: "Puto" by Janno Gibbs
- Composer: Janno Gibbs
- Country of origin: Philippines
- Original language: Tagalog
- No. of episodes: 13

Production
- Executive producers: Vic del Rosario Jr. Robert P. Galang; Ray C. Espinosa
- Producers: Sienna G. Olaso; Isabel A. Santillan; Vincent del Rosario; Veronique del Rosario-Corpus; Valerie S. del Rosario
- Camera setup: Multiple-camera setup
- Running time: 60 minutes
- Production companies: Viva Television; Cignal Entertainment

Original release
- Network: TV5
- Release: June 19 – September 11, 2021

Puto is a 2021 Philippine television fantasy comedy series broadcast by TV5. The series is a sequel to the 1987 Philippine film of the same title. Directed by Raynier Brizuela, it stars Herbert Bautista and McCoy de Leon. It aired on the network's TodoMax Weekend line up from June 19 to September 11, 2021, replacing 1000 Heartbeats: Pintig Pinoy and was replaced by the first season of Sing Galing: Sing-lebrity Edition.

== Plot ==
The story takes place years after the original movie, where Puto is a single father to his son Uno, who realizes he is half-duwende. Uno, like his father was constantly bullied by Nico and his other classmates in college. Confronted by challenges in life, Uno discovers that he has magical powers which can shake the lives of people around him. The duwende trio, who were rescued by Puto, take on human form as Mamitas to take care of Uno.

== Cast ==
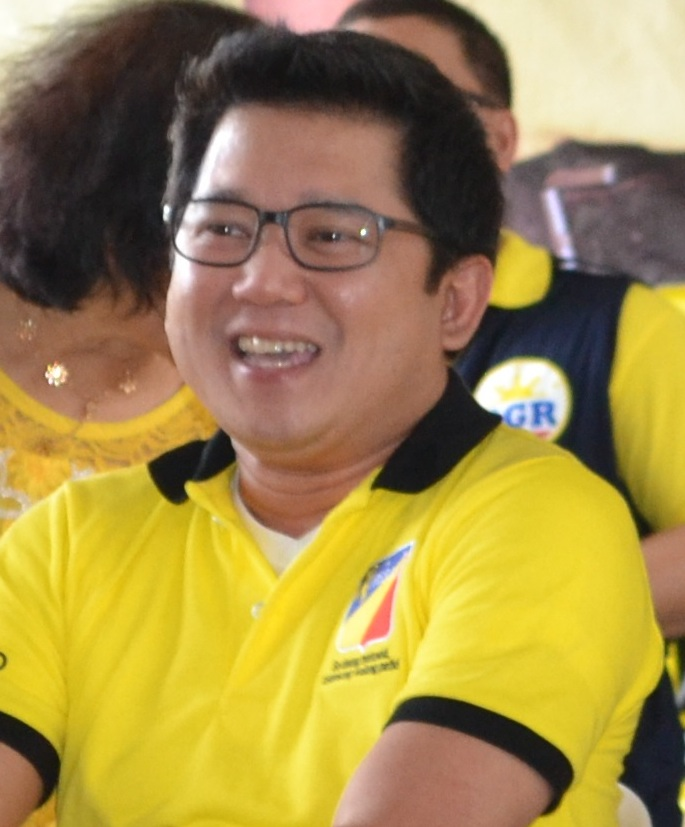
Herbert Bautista reprises his role as Puto Dela Cruz in the television sequel.

Main cast

- Herbert Bautista as Ivanhoe “Puto” Dela Cruz
- McCoy de Leon as Juan “Uno” Dela Cruz

Supporting cast

- Lassy Marquez as Mamita
- MC Calaquian as Mamita
- Chad Kinis as Mamita
- Rafa Siguion-Reyna as Ramon
- Andrea Babierra as Alex
- Bob Jbeili as Elong
- Carlyn Ocampo as Joy
- Andrew Muhlach as Nico
- Caleb Santos as Troy
- TJ Valderrama as Edwen
- Billy Villeta as Itaban
- Giovanni Respal as Markadan
- Janno Gibbs as Juanito
- Gelli de Belen as Mindy
- Bing Loyzaga as Tere
- Wilbert Ross as Johnston

== Episodes ==
Episodes of Puto
No. overall	No. in season	Title	Social media hashtag	Original release date
1	1	"Pilot"	#PutoTV5	June 19, 2021
2	2	"Tuloy Na Puto"	#2LoyNaPuto	June 26, 2021
3	3	"Nagkagulo Na Puto"	#NagkaguloNaPuto	July 3, 2021
4	4	"Busilak Ang Puto"	#BusilakAngPuto	July 10, 2021
5	5	"Tamang Hinala Puto"	#TamangHinalaPuto	July 17, 2021
6	6	"Epic Fail Puto"	#EpicFailPuto	July 24, 2021
7	7	"Delikado Na Puto"	#DelikadoNaPuto	July 31, 2021
8	8	"Viral Puto"	#ViralPuto	August 7, 2021
9	9	"May Powers Puto"	#MayPowersPuto	August 14, 2021
10	10	"Nag-Disappear Puto"	#NagDisappearPuto	August 21, 2021
11	11	"May Takot Puto"	#MayTakotPuto	August 28, 2021
12	12	"Worthy Na Puto"	#WorthyNaPuto	September 4, 2021
13	13	"Goodbye Na Ba Puto"	#GoodbyeNaBaPuto	September 11, 2021
