= Ronaldo Valdez =

Filipino actor (1947–2023)

- Valdez on the set of Seven Sundays (2017)
- Born: James Ronald Dulaca Gibbs; November 27, 1947; Sampaloc, Manila, Philippines
- Died: December 17, 2023 (aged 76); Quezon City, Metro Manila, Philippines
- Resting place: Loyola Memorial Chapels & Crematorium, Guadalupe, Makati City, Philippines
- Occupation: Actor
- Years active: 1966–2023
- Agent(s): ABS-CBN; GMA Network
- Spouse: Maria Fe Ilagan Gibbs (separated)
- Children: 2 (including Janno Gibbs)
- Relatives: Bing Loyzaga (daughter-in-law); Gerardo De Leon (father-in-law; deceased)

James Ronald Dulaca Gibbs (November 27, 1947 – December 17, 2023), popularly known by his screen name Ronaldo Valdez (Tagalog: [ɾɔˈnɐldɔ bɐlˈdɛs]), was a Filipino actor whose career spanned almost five decades.

== Career ==
Valdez started his earlier career as a leading man and was known for portraying paternal roles and antagonists in both TV and film.

Valdez was discovered by Dolphy at a neighborhood basketball court while he was searching for a new actor to pair with Susan Roces in the 1966 film Pepe En Pilar. His first major break came in the 1969 movie The Mad Doctor of Blood Island.

Valdez subsequently did many films in the 1970s and 1980s, where he gained popularity playing important father roles and rich father figures. He continued to be cast in this role in the 1990s and 2000s, most notably in TV dramas such as Mula sa Puso (1997–1999), Ang Munting Paraiso (1999–2002) and Sa Dulo ng Walang Hanggan (2001–2003), and the romantic comedy movie Labs Kita... Okey Ka Lang? (1998). To later generations, he was known for starring in TV series such as Los Bastardos (2018–2019) and 2 Good 2 Be True (2022), and films such as The Mistress (2012), All You Need Is Pag-ibig (2015) and Seven Sundays (2017). He also guest-hosted several television programs such as SOP Rules, Nuts Entertainment, Eat Bulaga!, Kakasa Ka Ba sa Grade 5?, Power of 10, All Star K! and Sunday All Stars.

In 2017, Valdez was selected by KFC to become the first Filipino Colonel after appearing in a viral comedic audition video for the role alongside Leo Martinez and Pen Medina.

His last two films that he was part of, GG (Good Game): The Movie (co-starring Donny Pangilinan, Maricel Laxa, Baron Geisler & Gold Aceron) and Itutumba Ka ng Tatay Ko (top-billed by his son Janno Gibbs in his directorial debut and starring Xia Vigor and Jeric Raval), were both posthumously released on January 24, 2024.

== Personal life ==
Valdez was married to Maria Fe Ilagan with whom they had two children, Janno and Melissa, who are both actors. He is also related to the Ilagan clan through his father-in-law Gerardo De Leon, Maria Fe's father, among whom are actors Jay Ilagan, Robert Arevalo and wife Barbara Perez, and Kenneth Ilagan, and to cousin Angelo Castro Jr. and wife June Keithley, and nephew Mondo Castro through his uncle, the former Chief Justice Fred Ruiz Castro.

In 2022, Valdez underwent surgery for prostate cancer.

== Death ==
Valdez died at the age of 76 on December 17, 2023, in Quezon City. The Daily Tribune, citing police investigators, reported that he had died from a gunshot wound to the head, although the Quezon City Police District said it was waiting for the results of laboratory testing to be released. Authorities later confirmed that a .45 caliber pistol with an empty magazine was found near Valdez’s body. He was discovered by his driver in his room at his home in New Manila and was rushed to hospital, where he was declared dead on arrival.

Following his death, three police officers were fired after graphic footage taken by first responders of the immediate aftermath of Valdez being found shot was leaked online. The Quezon City government ordered an investigation into the leak while Valdez's manager Jamela Santos threatened legal action against those responsible. Three civilians who also uploaded the footage on social media were also charged for cybercrime offenses and breaches of privacy laws. On January 16, 2024, the Quezon City Police District apologized to Valdez's family over the footage and subsequent leak.

== Filmography ==
=== Film ===
Year	Title	Role
1966	Pepe en Pilar	
1969	The Mad Doctor of Blood Island	Carlos Lopez
1971	Lumuluha Pati Mga Anghel	
1971	Lilet	Dr. Edgar Leynes
1974	Kung Bakit Dugo ang Kulay ng Gabi	
1974	Fe, Esperanza, Caridad	Ronaldo / Satan
1974	Daigdig ng Sindak at Lagim	
1974	Dalawa ang Nagdalantao sa Akin	
1975	Banaue: Stairway to the Sky	Aruk
1975	Sa Ibabaw ng Lahat	
1975	Niño Valiente	
1975	Langit, Lupa at Impiyerno (Pandemonium)	
1975	Ang Pag-ibig Ko'y Huwag Mong Sukatin	
1976	Hindi Kami Damong Ligaw	
1976	Tatlong Kasalanan	
1976	Magsikap: Kayod sa Araw, Kayod sa Gabi	
1976	Kung Bakit May Ulap ang Mukha ng Buwan	
1976	Mapang-akit... ang Dilim ng Gabi	
1977	Electrika Kasi, Eh!	
1977	Ang Diwata	
1977	Hagkan Mo ang Dugo sa Kamay ni Venus	
1977	Pang Adults Lamang	
1977	Babae... Ngayon at Kailanman	
1978	Iwasan: Kabaret	
1978	Sari-Saring Ibong Kulasisi	
1979	Iskandalo!	
1979	Ikaw... at ang Gabi	
1981	Karma	Eric
1981	Mahinhin vs Mahinhin	Peter
1982	Gaano Kadalas ang Minsan?	Eric
1983	Palabra de Honor	
1984	May Daga sa Labas ng Lungga	Ador/Adora the Adorable
1985	Lalakwe	Eric Verbo
1986	Napakasakit, Kuya Eddie	Mello
1987	Bunsong Kerubin	Carding / Carling
1987	Walang Karugtong ang Nakaraan	Mel
1989	Huwag Kang Hahalik sa Diablo	Satan
1990	Bad Boy	Ninong Rustico
1991	Sa Kabila ng Lahat	Mayor Ventura Velasco
1993	Ronquillo: Tubong Cavite, Laking Tondo	Cesar Moreno
1993	May Minamahal	Cenon Fernandez
1995	Campus Girls	Ramon
1995	Ipaglaban Mo! The Movie	Rosendo de Castro
1995	I Love You Sabado!!!	Juan’s father
1995	The Flor Contemplacion Story	Atty. Romeo Capulong
1995	The Grepor Butch Belgica Story	Don Porfirio Belgica
1995	Karanasan: The Claudia Zobel Story	
1996	Tubusin Mo ng Bala ang Puso Ko	Alfredo
1996	Virgin People 2	Ama
1996	Cedie	Earl of Dorincourt
1996	Isla (The Young Version)	
1998	Labs Kita... Okey Ka Lang?	Kanor
1998	Armadong Hudas	Miguel Reyes / Don Leo Segovia
1999	Tik Tak Toys, My Kolokotoys	Don Martin
1999	Oo Na, Mahal Na Kung Mahal	Tito Paul
2003	Till There Was You	Alfonso Robles
2006	Sukob	Fred
2008	When Love Begins	Leo Caballero
2010	Rosario	The priest
2011	Yesterday, Today, Tomorrow	Donald
2012	The Mistress	Frederico "Rico" Torres Sr.
2013	My Lady Boss	Carlos Strella
2015	All You Need Is Pag-Ibig	Jaime
2016	Girlfriend for Hire	Bernard "Abuelito" Stanford
2017	Seven Sundays	Brgy. Capt. Manuel Bonifacio
2018	I Love You, Hater	Cesar
2018	Jack Em Popoy: The Puliscredibles	Antonio Montenegro
2021	Mang Jose	Super Lapu-Lapu
2023	Ikaw at Ako	
2024	Itutumba Ka ng Tatay Ko	
2024	GG: Good Game	Francis
2026	Poon †	

=== Television ===
Year	Title	Role
1983	BLU: Bernardo, Lorenzo, Ulysses	
1997–1999	Mula sa Puso	Benjamin
1998	Sa Sandaling Kailangan Mo Ako	Recurring Role
1999–2002	Ang Munting Paraiso	Martin Dionisio
2001–2003	Sa Dulo ng Walang Hanggan	Don Teodoro / Miguel Crisostomo
2002–2003	Bituin	Amante Montesilverio
2004	Maalaala Mo Kaya: Upuan	Rene Cayetano
2004	Marinara	Don Juan Miguel
2005–2006	Sugo	Arando
2005–2007	Bahay Mo Ba 'To?	Nene Mulingtapang / Unyo
2007	Asian Treasures	Ulysses Agoncillo / Plaridel
2007–2008	Carlo J. Caparas' Kamandag	Don Pepe
2008	Full House	Lorenzo Lazatin
2008	My Girl	Gregory "Greg" Abueva
2008–2009	I Love Betty La Fea	Hermes Tingson
2009	Maalaala Mo Kaya: Bisikleta	Lolo Uge
2009–2010	Full House	Lorenzo Lazatin
2010	Kung Tayo'y Magkakalayo	Rustico "Supremo" Crisanto
2011	Minsan Lang Kita Iibigin	Gen. Jaime Sebastiano
2011	100 Days to Heaven	Attorney Galileo "Leo" Fonacier
2011–2012	Glamorosa	Don Manolo Herrera / Lolo Rambo
2012	Dahil sa Pag-ibig	Don Ramon Velasco
2012–2013	Ina, Kapatid, Anak	Zacharias "Lolo Zach" Apolinario
2013	Kahit Nasaan Ka Man	Lolo Tino Gomez
2013	Wansapanataym: Sako Lantern	Santa Claus
2014	Ikaw Lamang	Don Maximo Salazar
2015	Healing Hearts	Benjie
2015	Pasión de Amor	Don Bernardo Elizondo
2015	FPJ's Ang Probinsyano	Leonardo Demetrio / Conrado "Ninong" Villegas
2015	Kapamilya, Deal or No Deal	Himself/lucky player
2016	My Super D	Don Ramoncito "Ramon" Zulueta
2016	Magpahanggang Wakas	Antonio "Tony" Sandoval
2017	Meant to Be	Enrico "Ric" Villaroman
2018–2019	Precious Hearts Romances Presents: Los Bastardos	Don Roman Cardinal
2021	John en Ellen	Don Lucky
2022	2 Good 2 Be True	Sebastian Hugo "Lolo Sir" Agcaoili

== Awards and nominations ==
Ronaldo Valdez was one of the few actors who have won all four of the major awards in the Philippines for the same work. He joined the exclusive Grand Slam club in 1994, when he won the Best Supporting Actor awards in the Film Academy of the Philippines Awards, FAMAS Awards, Gawad Urian, and the Star Awards for his role in May Minamahal.

Year	Award	Category	Nominated work	Result	Ref.
1994	Film Academy of the Philippines Awards	Best Supporting Actor	May Minamahal	Won	
1994	Gawad Urian	Best Supporting Actor	May Minamahal	Won	
1994	FAMAS Awards	Best Supporting Actor	May Minamahal	Won	
1994	Star Awards for Movies	Best Supporting Actor	May Minamahal	Won	
1997	Metro Manila Film Festival	Best Supporting Actor	Nasaan ang Puso?	Won	
2013	27th Star Awards for TV	Best Drama Supporting Actor	Ina Kapatid Anak	Nominated	
2014	28th Star Awards for TV	Best Drama Supporting Actor	Ikaw Lamang	Nominated	
2015	Golden Screen TV Awards	Helen Vela Lifetime Achievement Award for Drama	—N/a	Won	
