= Little Boy (album) =

Studio album by Janno Gibbs
- Released: November 2007
- Recorded: 2007
- Genre: R&B, Soul
- Language: English, Tagalog
- Label: GMA Records
- Producer: Felipe S. Yalung (EVP and COO); Buddy Medina (Executive Producer); Kedy Sanchez (Producer); Janno Gibbs (co-producer); Rene A. Salta (Managing Director)

Janno Gibbs chronology
Seven (Special Edition) (2005)	Little Boy (2007)	ORIG (2009)

Singles from Little Boy
- 1. "Ikaw Lang at Ako" Released: 2007; 2. "Walang Kadala-dala" Released: 2007; 3. "Sexy Mama" Released: 2008; 4. "Kung Tayo'y Magkakalayo" Released: 2008

Little Boy is the eighth album of singer/actor/host Janno Gibbs. This 10-track album was produced and released by GMA Records in November, 2007.

In mid-2008, GMA Records released a special edition album of Little Boy which contain additional two tracks, Lupin the theme song of the action-adventure series of the same title, written by Janno Gibbs himself and featuring actress Ara Mina; and the revival Muli (Again), a Vehnee Saturno composition, which is also the theme song of an afternoon drama of the same title.

== Track listing ==
No.	Title	Writer(s)	Length
1.	"Walang Kadala-dala"	Janno Gibbs	4:11
2.	"Ikaw Lang at Ako"	Janno Gibbs	3:44
3.	"Little Boy"	Janno Gibbs	4:20
4.	"You Are to Me"	Janno Gibbs	3:47
5.	"Kung tayo'y Magkakalayo"	Rey Valera	3:50
6.	"Sexy Mama (feat. Andrew E.)"	Janno Gibbs	4:34
7.	"Let Me Be The One (with Jolina Magdangal)"	Janno Gibbs	4:03
8.	"Pinakamamahal"	Janno Gibbs	4:16
9.	"Ako Si Superman"	Rey Valera	4:14
10.	"Moments of Love (with Jennylyn Mercado)"	Michael Cruz, Isela Cruz	4:20

Special Edition bonus tracks
No.	Title	Writer(s)	Length
1.	"Lupin (feat. Ara Mina)"	Janno Gibbs	4:12
2.	"Muli"	Vehnee Saturno	4:08
