= 2nd Miracle in Cell No. 7 =

2nd Miracle in Cell No. 7 may refers to:

- 2nd Miracle in Cell No. 7 (2024 film)
- 2nd Miracle in Cell No. 7 (2026 film)
