= Miracle in Cell No. 7 (2019 Philippine film) =

2019 drama film by Nuel C. Naval

- Theatrical release poster
- Directed by: Nuel Crisostomo Naval
- Screenplay by: Mel Mendoza-del Rosario
- Based on: Miracle in Cell No. 7 (2013) by Lee Hwan-kyung
- Produced by: Vincent G. Del Rosario III; Veronique D. Corpus
- Starring: Aga Muhlach; Xia Vigor; Bela Padilla
- Cinematography: Anne Monzon
- Edited by: Beng Bandong
- Music by: Francis Concio
- Production company: Viva Films
- Distributed by: Viva Films
- Release date: December 25, 2019
- Running time: 119 minutes
- Country: Philippines
- Language: Filipino
- Box office: ₱543 million

Miracle in Cell No. 7 is a 2019 Philippine drama film directed by Nuel Crisostomo Naval from a screenplay written by Mel Mendoza-del Rosario, based on the 2013 South Korean film of the same name directed by Lee Hwan-kyung. Starring Aga Muhlach, Xia Vigor and Bela Padilla, the story follows Lito, a mentally challenged man who was wrongfully accused of killing the daughter of Secretary Yulo as well as his attempt to maintain relations with his own daughter, Yesha, through the help of his fellow inmates.

Produced and distributed by Viva Films, the film premiered on December 25, 2019, as one of the eight official entries to the 45th Metro Manila Film Festival.

== Plot ==
Joselito “Lito” Gopez is a mentally impaired man with the intellect of a six-year-old. He lives in a run-down house by the Marikina River along with his daughter, Yesha. One day, he gets into a physical altercation with Defense Secretary Emmanuel Yulo, who has just purchased the last Sailor Moon backpack for his daughter Jenny, a gift Lito was saving up to buy for Yesha. Soon after, Jenny dies in a freak accident, in which she slips because of the wet pavement and suffers a fatal blow in the head while taking Lito to a store that sells the same backpack. When Lito tries to resuscitate her, a bystander mistakenly thinks he is molesting her. Lito is falsely accused of the kidnapping, murder and rape of a minor. Police quickly take advantage of his disability and force him to confess to the crimes while ignoring exonerating evidence. Lito is imprisoned and assigned to Cell No. 7, the harshest cell in a maximum security prison.

The other men in the cell, led by gang leader Soliman “Boss Sol” with Mambo, Choy, Bong, and Tatang Celso, initially don't take kindly to Lito after reading in his file that he murdered and molested a child. When Lito saves Boss Sol from being fatally stabbed by a rival gang leader, Boss Sol repays the favor by smuggling Yesha into Cell No. 7. The cell's inmates slowly befriend Lito and believe he is a good man who just happened to be in the wrong place at the wrong time. They help him rehearse what to say at his trial. Eventually, even the warden Johnny, who is initially harsh to Lito but softens up when the latter saves him from an arson attack, realizes that Lito was merely cornered into making a false confession. He takes custody of Yesha and allows her to visit her father every now and then.

Secretary Yulo, however, threatens to harm Yesha if Lito doesn't confess his "crime" during his trial. Lito ultimately chooses to sacrifice himself by pleading guilty and getting the death sentence. His execution date of December 23 coincides with Yesha's birthday. Before the date, Boss Sol and fellow inmates work on a hot air balloon and force Lito and Yesha to board to try and let them escape, but ultimately fail because a rope connected to the hot air balloon caught in barbed wire. Later on in the film, Lito was executed.

Years after Lito's execution, Yesha, who has been formally adopted by Johnny, has become a lawyer. She gathers her father's former inmates, all of whom have been released, to testify at her late father's retrial, which results in his acquittal. She then imagines her father dancing with their signature dance.

== Cast ==
=== Main cast ===
- Aga Muhlach as Joselito "Lito" Gopez
- Bela Padilla as Atty. Yesha Marie Gopez
  - Xia Vigor as young Yesha

=== Supporting cast ===
- Joel Torre as Soliman/Boss Sol
- JC Santos as Mambo
- Mon Confiado as Choy
- Jojit Lorenzo as Bong
- Soliman Cruz as Tatang Celso
- John Arcilla as Prison Director P/Lt. Col. Johnny San Juan
- Tirso Cruz III as Secretary P/Lt. Gen. Emmanuel Yulo
- Ronnie Lazaro as Investigator Romeo
- Yayo Aguila as Cathy San Juan
- Epy Quizon as prosecutor
- Mark Anthony Fernandez as Pancho
- Candy Pangilinan as orphanage rectress
- Ian de Leon as Lawyer/Atty. Norman
- Christopher Roxas as Investigator
- Jong Cuenco as Judge Ricardo Giron
- Mayton Eugenio as Teacher Marilou
- Jonic Magno as Doctor

== Production ==
Miracle in Cell No. 7 was directed by Nuel Naval and written by Mel del Rosario under Viva Films. The film is an adaptation of the 2013 South Korean film of the same name. The original film was directed by Lee Hwan-kyung.

The film, being a Philippine adaptation of a South Korean film, is set in the Philippines. The protagonists' residence is situated somewhere along the Marikina River. Several other aspects of the film were changed from the source material, including the names of the characters. The prison which served as the main setting of the Philippine adaptation was filmed in a sound stage in Cainta, Rizal.

Aga Muhlach's character is the counterpart of Yong-gu of the original Korean film, while Bela Padilla's character was the counterpart of Yong-gu's daughter Ye-seung. Among the challenges posed by the adaptation process is how a faithful depiction of Philippine prisons would affect the film's plot. In the original South Korean film, the prisons were closed confinements with metal doors, while in the Philippines, prisons are less restrictive with metal railings instead, which would pose a problem in how the lead character's fellow inmates would hide his daughter from the jail wardens. The Philippine film also had less focus on the trial portion compared to its South Korean counterpart.

Nadine Lustre was supposed to play Padilla's role but withdrew from the film project citing a need to take a break after her stints with two 2019 films, Ulan and Indak.

== Marketing ==
A teaser was released in November 2019 for Miracle in Cell No. 7 which had at least 7 million online views in 24 hours. The full trailer for the film was released in December 2019. Lead actor, Aga Muhlach also guested in Headstart to promote the film.

== Release ==
Miracle in Cell No. 7 premiered in cinemas across the Philippines on December 25, 2019, as one of the official entries to the 45th Metro Manila Film Festival. The film was distributed by Viva Films.

== Reception ==
Viva Films, the distributor and producer of Miracle in Cell No. 7 claims that tickets to its film were sold out in most cinemas in Metro Manila on the opening day of the film festival.

== Prequel ==
A prequel for the film has been announced for the 2026 Metro Manila Film Festival titled 2nd Miracle in Cell No. 7. It is based on the original Indonesian prequel of the same name released in 2024.
