= Denny Sumargo =

Indonesian former basketball player, actor, presenter and content creator

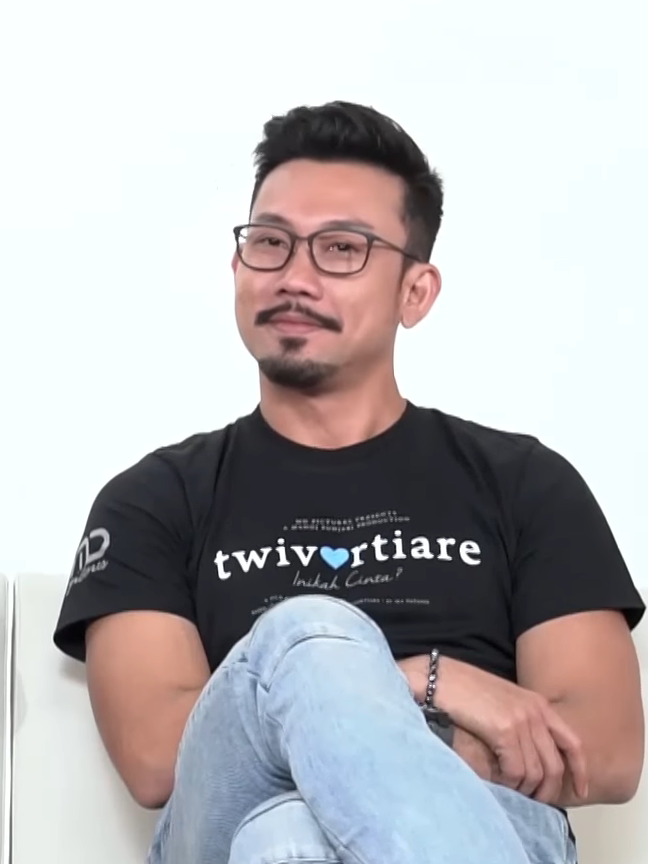
- Denny on a Media Indonesia interview
- Born: 11 October 1981 (age 45); Ujung Pandang, South Sulawesi, Indonesia
- Occupations: Actor; basketballer; presenter; content creator
- Years active: 2000–2011 as athlete; 2012–present as actor and presenter; 2020–present as content creator
- Spouse: Olivia Allan (m. 2020)
- Children: 1
- Basketball career

Personal information
- Listed height: 181 cm (5 ft 11 in)

Career information
- Playing career: 2000–2011
- Position: Shooting guard / small forward

Career history
- 2000–2004: Aspac Jakarta
- 2004–2008: Satria Muda BritAma
- 2008–2011: Garuda Bandung

Career highlights
- IBL Finals MVP (2003); 5× Kobatama/IBL champion (2001–2003, 2006, 2007); 6× Kobatama/IBL All Defensive Team (2001–2006); 2× Kobatama/IBL Most Valuable Player (2002, 2003); IBL All-Star (2003); IBL Slam Dunk Contest Champion (2003); Kobatama Rookie of the Year (2001)

Denny Sumargo (born 11 October 1981), nicknamed Densu, is an Indonesian former basketball player for the Indonesia national team, actor, model, content creator, and TV presenter. Based in Jakarta, he is known as a basketball player for his speed and powerful slam dunk, playing as a guard. He is also known for his YouTube podcast channel CURHAT BANG Denny Sumargo.

== Personal life ==
Sumargo was born in Ujung Pandang (now Makassar) to a Minangkabau father, Nazaruddin Chaniago (full name: Haji Nazar Chang bin Bandaro, of the Suku Koto), a former officer in the Indonesian Army, and a Chinese Indonesian mother, Meiske Sumargo. His parents divorced shortly after his birth, citing opposition from his mother's family and his father's gambling addiction. He was raised solely by his mother.

Denny married Olivia Allan on 21 November 2020 in an intimate outdoor ceremony. On 27 July 2024, the couple welcomed their first child, a daughter named Gabriella Allan Sumargo. The name Gabriella was inspired by a prayer the couple made at an old church in Italy, and is seen as carrying a hopeful meaning for their daughter.

He was previously rumoured to have dated Sandra Dewi, with whom he appeared in an advertisement; both denied the rumour. In 2011, he was reported to be close to Agnez Mo, though she stated they were only friends. He was also accused of fathering a child belonging to a female disc jockey named Verny Hasan, a claim he denied. In 2019, Denny's mother revealed DNA test results showing the child was not his, and Verny subsequently held a press conference apologising to Denny and his family.

In 2018, Denny became engaged to businesswoman Dita Soedarjo, but the engagement was called off later that year.

== Career ==
=== Basketball ===
After graduating from high school, Sumargo moved to Jakarta in 2000. Initially struggling to find work, he tried out for a scholarship with basketball club Aspac Jakarta and was accepted. He played as a shooting guard or small forward for Aspac and later Satria Muda BritAma.

His career was hampered by an injury sustained during the second game of the Indonesian Basketball League Finals in 2008, when his right ankle swelled severely.

=== Entertainment ===
In 2011, Sumargo decided to leave professional basketball and enter the Indonesian entertainment industry. He made his acting debut in the film Hattrick (2012), alongside Arumi Bachsin, Lukman Sardi, and Dion Wiyoko.

That same year, he appeared in 5 cm, a film about a group of friends who climb Mount Semeru together. Denny played Arial, the older brother of Arinda (portrayed by Pevita Pearce), alongside Fedi Nuril, Herjunot Ali, Raline Shah, and Igor Saykoji.

Over the course of his career, Sumargo has appeared in more than ten films, including Mall Klender (2014), Rock N Love (2015), Erau Kota Raja (2015), The Doll (2016), and Twivortiare (2019).

== Achievements ==
=== Individual ===
- Rookie of the Year (2001)
- Slam Dunk Contest champion (2003)
- All Defensive Team (2001–2006)
- Most Valuable Player — Kobatama Regular Season (2002, 2003)
- Most Valuable Player — Indonesian Basketball League (2008)

=== Team ===
- Kobatama champion (2000–2002, with Aspac)
- 4th place — SEABA (2001, Manila, Philippines)
- Kobatama Tournament champion (2002, Surabaya, with Aspac)
- IBL season champion (2003, with HP Aspac)
- IBL runner-up (2004, with Aspac)
- 2nd place — SEABA (2007, Jakarta, with Satria Muda BritAma)
- IBL runner-up (2008)
- Sister City champion (Jakarta, with Satria Muda BritAma)
- Liga Basket Indonesia champion
- IBL champion (Yogyakarta, with Satria Muda BritAma)
- 7th place — ABC Championship (Dubai, UAE)

== Filmography ==
=== Film ===
Year	Title	Role	Notes
2012	Hattrick	Galang	
2012	5 cm	Arial	
2013	Berlian Si Etty	Roby	
2013	308	Sena Ardiyansyah	
2013	1000 Balon	Villain	
2014	Mall Klender	Panji	
2014	Danau Hitam	Boy	
2015	Erau Kota Raja	Reza	
2015	Rock N Love	Aldi	
2016	The Doll	Daniel	
2017	Kartini	Raden Mas Slamet	
2017	Mata Batin	Davin	
2018	A Man Called Ahok	Young Kim Nam	
2019	Twivortiare	Denny	
2021	Balada Sepasang Kekasih Gila	Jarot	
2021	Yowis Ben 3	Arjuna	
2021	Yowis Ben Finale	Arjuna	
2022	Miracle in Cell No. 7	Hendro Sanusi	
2022	Perfect Strangers	Anjas	
2024	Dewi	Rino	
2024	2nd Miracle in Cell No. 7	Hendro Sanusi	
2025	Panji Tengkorak	Panji	Voice
2026	BABY UDON (Film)	Hajime Kondoh	Producer & actor

=== Television series ===
Year	Title	Role	Notes
2015	Masalembo	Kalawa	
2015–2016	Tetangga Masa Gitu?	Pak Charles	
2016–2017	The Transmart	Ismail	

=== Web series ===
Year	Title	Role	Notes
2020	Cerita Sebuah Catatan	Male model	
2024	Ellyas Pical	Ellyas Pical	
TBA	Rahasia Meede †		

Key
†	Denotes films that have not yet been released

=== Television programmes ===
- La Liga (tvOne)
- My Trip My Adventure (Trans TV)
- Love Jukebox (Trans TV)
- Super 10 Indonesia (RTV)
- Dream Box Indonesia (Trans TV)
- Bikin Laper (Trans TV)
- Dewan Curhat (Trans7)
- Indonesia's Got Talent (RCTI)
- Ini Talkshow (NET.)

=== FTV ===
- My Trip My Adventure: The Lost Paradise (2018)

== Awards and nominations ==
Year	Award	Category	Work	Result	Ref
2018	Piala Maya	Best Supporting Actor	A Man Called Ahok	Nominated	
2019	Indonesian Movie Actors Awards	Best Supporting Actor	A Man Called Ahok	Won	
2019	Indonesian Movie Actors Awards	Favourite Supporting Actor	A Man Called Ahok	Nominated	
2019	Indonesian Box Office Movie Awards	Best Leading Actor	A Man Called Ahok	Won	
2019	Festival Film Bandung	Best Leading Actor	A Man Called Ahok	Nominated	
2022	Festival Film Wartawan Indonesia	Best Supporting Actor – Drama	Miracle in Cell No. 7	Won	
2023	Festival Film Bandung	Best Supporting Actor	Miracle in Cell No. 7	Nominated	
2023	Indonesian Movie Actors Awards	Best Supporting Actor	Miracle in Cell No. 7	Nominated	
2023	Indonesian Movie Actors Awards	Favourite Supporting Actor	Miracle in Cell No. 7	Won	
2023	Festival Film Wartawan Indonesia	Best Supporting Actor – Drama	Perfect Strangers	Nominated	
2024	Festival Film Bandung	Best Leading Actor – Web Series	Ellyas Pical	Nominated	
2025	Indonesian Inspiring Celebrity Awards	Most Wanted Celebrity	—	Nominated	

== See also ==
- FIBA Asia Championship 2007
- FIBA Asia Championship 2007 squads
