= Orig =

Studio album by Janno Gibbs
- Released: March 2009
- Recorded: 2009]
- Genre: R&B, Soul
- Language: English, Tagalog
- Label: GMA Records
- Producer: Felipe S. Yalung (EVP and COO); Buddy Medina (Executive Producer); Kedy Sanchez (Producer); Janno Gibbs (co-producer); Rene A. Salta (Managing Director)

Janno Gibbs chronology
Little Boy (2007)	Orig (2009)	The Janno Gibbs' Anthology (2011)

Singles from Orig
- 1. "Igiling" Released: 2009; 2. "Asero" Released: 2009; 3. "Gagambino" Released: 2010; 4. "I Haven't Stopped Loving You" Released: 2010

Orig (stylize as ORIG and short for "Original") is the ninth album of singer/songwriter/actor/host Janno Gibbs. This 11-track, all-original album was produced and released by GMA Records in March, 2009. The album is available on CD and on a limited edition secure digital album format, actually a mini-SD with 2GB capacity.

== Track listing ==
No.	Title	Writer(s)	Length
1.	"I Haven't Stopped Loving You"	Janno Gibbs	4:34
2.	"Don't Know Why"	Janno Gibbs	4:01
3.	"Ready to Fall"	Janno Gibbs	4:23
4.	"Igiling"	Janno Gibbs	3:53
5.	"Ang Aking Puso (with Kyla)"	Janno Gibbs	4:05
6.	"Huling Babae"	Janno Gibbs	4:37
7.	"Asero (theme from Codename: Asero)"	Janno Gibbs	2:53
8.	"Obvious Ba"	Janno Gibbs	3:38
9.	"Para-Paraan"	Janno Gibbs	5:00
10.	"Payong Kaibigan"	Janno Gibbs	5:31
11.	"Gagambino (theme from Gagambino)"	Janno Gibbs	3:40

== Personnel ==
- Producers: Kedy Sanchez & Janno Gibbs
- Executive producer: Buddy C. Medina
- Marketing: Rene A. Salta
- A&R supervision: Kedy Sanchez
- Production coordination: Louella Tiongson

Recorded and mixed at

- GMA Network Recording Studios
  - Sound engineer: Oyet San Diego
  - Additional engineering: Edwin Dimaano, Archie Gaba
- Asiatec Pink Noise Recording Studios
  - Sound engineer: Dominic Benedicto
  - Additional engineering: Nikki Cunanan, Ramil Bahandi
- Draginlair Studios
  - Sound engineers: Voltaire Orpiano, Raul Mitra
