= Janno Gibbs =

Filipino actor, comedian and singer-songwriter (born 1969)

- Born: Janno Ronaldo Ilagan Gibbs; September 16, 1969 (age 57); Manila, Philippines
- Other names: Mokong, The (Philippine) King of Soul
- Spouse: Bing Loyzaga (m. 1991)
- Children: 2
- Parents: Ronaldo Valdez (father); Maria Fe "Baby" Ylagan-Gibbs (mother)
- Relatives: Melissa Gibbs (sister); Teresa Loyzaga (sister-in-law); Princess Loyzaga (sister-in-law); Chito Loyzaga (brother-in-law); Joey Loyzaga (brother-in-law); Carlos Loyzaga (father-in-law); Vicky Cuerva (mother-in-law)
- Musical career
- Genres: OPM, soul; pop; R&B
- Occupations: Singer; songwriter; comedian; actor
- Instruments: Vocals; piano
- Years active: 1986–present
- Labels: GMA Music (2004–2018; 2025–present); Star Music (2018); Viva Records (1999–2004; 2019–2025)

Janno Ronaldo Ilagan Gibbs (born September 16, 1969) is a Filipino singer, songwriter, comedian and actor. He was a regular host of GMA Network television shows SOP Rules, Nuts Entertainment, Eat Bulaga!, Kakasa Ka Ba Sa Grade 5?, Power of 10, Party Pilipinas and Sunday All Stars.

== Early career ==
Gibbs started out in 1986 as one of the members of the teen variety show That's Entertainment on GMA Network. Gibbs then played some minor film roles for Viva Films. He was co-host of the TV show Small Brothers in 1990. Gibbs is also known as "Late", "Mokong" and "Philippine's King of Soul".

== Television career ==
Gibbs is known for his role in the '90s sitcom Ober Da Bakod and Beh Bote Nga, both with Anjo Yllana. Gibbs also played the character Geron Agular in Codename: Asero which was aired in 2008. In 2001, Gibbs hired as a co-host of the longest-running noontime variety show in the Philippines Eat Bulaga! until 2007 due to his late appearance in the show.

Gibbs has several television shows like Eat Bulaga!, SOP, Party Pilipinas, Sunday All Stars, Nuts Entertainment, Ober Da Bakod and Beh Bote Nga. Gibbs also hosted a show Kakasa Ka Ba Sa Grade 5?, the Filipino version of Are You Smarter than a 5th Grader? from 2007 to 2009.

Gibbs moved to TV5 after being with GMA Network for 30 years. He is one of the hosts of TV5's game and musical variety show Happy Truck ng Bayan. In 2017, Gibbs appeared once again in his former network, through Meant to Be.

Later in the year, he appeared on some shows of ABS-CBN such as The Voice Teens and on the Magpasikat 2017 segment on It's Showtime, as one of the "hurados" along with Director Rory B. Quintos, actress Ina Raymundo, journalist Marc Logan, and Philippines' Diamond Star Maricel Soriano.

Gibbs returns to Kapamilya Network in 2018 following the returning also of his SOP colleagues Regine Velasquez and Jaya, and his also long time best friend Ogie Alcasid.

Gibbs moves to Net 25 for his comedy variety show Happy Time, with co hosts fellow comedian Kit Kat & comedian and long time best friend and former dabarkads host and former Parañaque Vice Mayor Anjo Yllana, and also marking their returning duo of Janno-Anjo Team since their last project together was a comedy gag show Nuts Entertainment in 2003 on GMA 7, Happy Time was premiered last August 2020 exclusively aired on NET 25 (an Iglesia Ni Cristo TV Network).

== Film career ==
His first film was Kalabog en Bosyo Strike Again released in 1986 which stars Dolphy and Panchito Alba, then his very first drama movie Payaso with Master Showman German "Kuya Germs" Moreno the same year in 1986, followed by his first Viva Films film, Puto with his co-star Herbert Bautista, Mia Pratts, Gelli De Belen, his real life wife Bing Loyzaga-Gibbs and Panchito Alba the comedy film was released in 1987. his first Regal Entertainment movie was Stupid Cupid a romantic comedy movie was released in 1988.

His following film is the action-comedy film Tora-Tora, Bang Bang Bang, where he plays a news reporter with co-stars Eddie Gutierrez, and also special participation of former DZRH, DWIZ & now DZRJ AM news correspondent anchor & host Rey Langit; it was released in 1990. Gibbs' first action-drama film was Hindi Ka Na Sisikatan ng Araw: Kapag Puno Na ang Salop Part-III, where he co-stars with Fernando Poe Jr.; it was also released in 1990 by FPJ Productions.

Gibbs released his film under Viva Films titled Astig with Dennis Padilla in 1993.

His comedy movie Ober Da Bakod: Da Movie which stars former Parañaque Vice Mayor Anjo Yllana, Malou De Guzman, Angelu De Leon, stage actor turned comedian Leo Martinez, Donita Rose, Gelli De Belen, Dale Villar, and former beauty queen Michelle Aldana; the comedy movie was directed by TV host, radio host and comedian Ariel Ureta and it was released by Viva Films in 1994.

Gibbs released his action comedy fantasy film, Ang Pagbabalik ni Pedro Penduko which co-stars Donita Rose, Vina Morales, Malou De Guzman, former dancer Rez Cortez, gay comedian Arnel Ignacio, stage actor turned comedian actor Leo Martinez & action star Jun Aristorenas, with special participations of action stars real life cousins Robin Padilla and action star Rudy "Daboy" Fernandez, hip hop recording turned comedian Andrew E., Anjanette Abayari and of course action king Fernando Poe Jr., this action comedy fantasy movie was released by Viva Family Entertainment (now Viva Films) in 1995.

Gibbs released his film under Viva Films titled Si Mokong, si Astig at si Gamol together with Andrew E. and Dennis Padilla in 1997.

Gibbs also released his comedy film Enteng & Mokong which stars Bossing Vic Sotto, and Maricel Laxa, and was released in 1999 by M-Zet Productions and MAQ Productions (now Regal Entertainment).

Gibbs also made a Holy Week Drama TV Movie Special on Eat Bulaga entitled True Love in 2005.

Gibbs returns again as a role of Pedro Penduko in the action fantasy comedy film Pedro Penduko: Episode II – The Return of the Comeback, with co-stars comedian Jeffrey Tam, action star Ace Espinosa, LJ Moreno, former child star Goyong, his real life daughter Alyssa Gibbs and action kung fu star Ramon Zamora, and also with special participation of Christopher De Leon, action star Cesar Montano, singer turned comedian Ogie Alcasid, and Joyce Jimenez; this action fantasy comedy movie was released by Viva Films in 2000.

His most notable recent comedy film was Weyt a Minute, Kapeng Mainit was released in 2001 by Viva Films, and Juan & Ted: Wanted with Bayani Agbayani, Carla Guevarra, Anne Curtis-Eussaff, comedian Romy "Dagul" Pastrana, and comedian Ching Arellano; it was released also in 2001.

Gibbs returns to a big screen in a comedy movie with co-stars hip hop superstar Andrew E., Astig Comedian Dennis Padilla in Sanggano, Sanggago't Sanggwapo with the special participation of Manoy Eddie Garcia who also Manoys last movie before his passing in 2019, the wackiest sexy comedy movie was recently shown last September 2019 and release by VIVA Films. His recent wackiest comedy movie was Pakboys Takusa with Andrew E., Dennis Padilla and his new character singer turned comedian Jerald Napoles, and was released by VIVA Films for the 2020 Metro Manila Film Festival Digital Stream Edition in December 2020.

In 2023, he starred in the new comedy film Hello Universe directed by Xian Lim starring Anjo Yllana, Maui Taylor and others. In 2024, he starred and directed its new comedy and action film Itutumba Ka ng Tatay Ko starring Xia Vigor, Anjo Yllana, Mr. Ronaldo Valdez, Maui Taylor and others.

In 2026, he starred and directed in the new comedy film ChickBoy starring DJ Durano, Robb Guinto and others.

== Music career ==
Gibbs released a Vicor Music single called "Miss" in 1988 which became a radio hit. His second album entitled Ipagpatawad received a Gold and Platinum Award. One of the singles from that album with the same title won the 1991 Awit Award for Best Revival. Poly Cosmic Records released his third and fourth album. The third, entitled Bulong contains two of his original compositions. It also contained a revival entitled "Binibini" and the much loved "I Believe in Dreams". His fourth album "Another Chance", carries the hit song "Pinakamagandang Babae" which he himself composed, plus the moving love song "Another Chance" and the revivals such as "Kartada Diez", "Ang Pag-Ibig Talaga" and "Saying Goodbye". His album Sa 'Yo was again released through Viva Records where it had received a Gold Record Award. In 2001, Viva Records released an all revival album Divas & I which contains duet with the divas. In 2002, Viva Records released a live album called Janno Live Viva's and I. In 2004, Gibbs was now also a recording artist of GMA Records when he released his album entitled "Seven", as it is also his seventh album. Viva Records had a compilation album called Silver Series which contained duets with Pops Fernandez, Jaya, Regine Velasquez, Rachel Alejandro and Ogie Alcasid. In 2007, Gibbs created an album called Little Boy which contained seven of his original composition. In 2008, Gibbs created a new album entitled Orig where 11 songs are composed and produced by himself. In 2010, Gibbs created another compilation album called The Janno Gibbs Anthology in which 18 of the songs are his compositions. In 2014, Gibbs created another album called Novela which contains the telenovela theme songs of GMA. In 2016, Gibbs created a single for his birthday titled "Get It On". In 2017, Gibbs records and created his latest single under GMA Records titled "My Jagiya" also a theme song of GMA's television series My Korean Jagiya. In 2017, Gibbs releases his new album this year very soon under GMA Records. In January 2018, Gibbs released a new digital album called Nagbabalik which includes his single "Get It On, Oh Girl" featuring Andrew E. and many more under GMA Records available on Spotify and other digital stores nationwide. In 2021, Gibbs releases his two new singles under Viva Records titled Pangmalakasan and Pag-Ibig Kong Tunay after three years. On September 16, 2022, Gibbs releases his new single under Viva Records on his birthday titled "Future Lover". On April 19, 2023, Gibbs releases his new single under Viva Records titled Kung Hindi Susubukan. On May 24, 2024, Gibbs releases his new single under Viva Records titled "Sige Na, Sorry". On July 10, 2025, Gibbs returned to GMA Music after 7 years. Gibbs revealed that GMA Music is approved three or four songs written by him. In March to May 2026, GMA Music dedicates a month-long celebration to Gibbs the label will highlight his extensive discography, including his most-streamed tracks and beloved television theme songs which the label typically use to build momentum for a new EP or digital album. On May 15, 2026, Gibbs releases his comeback single under GMA Music titled "Pinay Pa Rin". On November 20, 2026, Gibbs releases his new single under GMA Music titled Nung Ikaw Ay Akin.

His most notable songs are, among others:

- "Fallin'"
- "Binibini"
- "Pinakamagandang Lalaki"
- "If I'm Not in Love with You" (with Jennylyn Mercado)
- "Heart of Mine"
- "I Believe in Dreams"
- "Ipagpatawad Mo"
- "Ikaw Lamang" (with Jaya)
- "Kung Mamahalin Mo Lang Ako"
- "Sana Dalawa ang Puso Ko"
- "Moments of Love" (with Jennylyn Mercado)
- "Muli"
- "Walang Kadala-Dala"
- "Sexy Mama" (with Andrew E.)
- "Umibig Muli"
- "Sa'yo"
- "Evergreen" (with Regine Velasquez)
- "Sa Lahat ng Aming Inibig" (with Ogie Alcasid)
- "If I Sing You a Love Song"
- "Only Me and You"
- "I Will Always Stay in Love"
- "He Opens a Window"
- "Narito Pa Rin Ako"
- "Awitin Kong Ito"
- "Pinakamamahal"
- "Kasinungalingan"
- "Iba Ka" (with Andrew E.)
- "Batang-Bata Ka Pa" (with Alyssa Gibbs)
- "For Love of You"
- "Di Ko Man Lang Alam"
- "Soon"
- "I'll Take Care of You"
- "I Will Be"
- "Lalake Lang Ako"
- "Paraiso Ko'y Ikaw"
- "Haven't Stopped Loving You"
- "Lupin"
- "Asero"
- "Gagambino"
- "Pinakamagandang Babae"
- "Kartada Diez"
- "Ang Pag-Ibig Talaga"
- "Saying Goodbye"
- "Ikaw, Ako, at Siya" (with Jaya and Julie Anne San Jose)
- "Never Gonna Let You Go" (with Jennylyn Mercado)
- "Get It On"
- "Oh Girl"
- "My Jagiya"
- "Feeling JKL"
- "Pangmalakasan"
- "Pag-Ibig Kong Tunay"
- "Future Lover"
- "Kung Hindi Susubukan"
- "Sige Na, Sorry"
- "Pinay Pa Rin"
- "Nung Ikaw Ay Akin"

== Personal life ==
He is the son of veteran actor Ronaldo Valdez and Maria Fe Gibbs. He is married to actress Bing Loyzaga on January 6, 1991. Together, they had 2 daughters named Alyssa and Gabby.

== Discography ==
- Janno (Viva Records, 1988)
- Ipagpatawad (Sunshine Records "now Vicor Music Corp.", 1990)
- Bulong (Cosmic Records "now PolyEast Records", 1992)
- Another Chance (PolyCosmic Records "now PolyEast Records", 1996)
- Sa 'Yo (Viva Records, 1999)
- Divas & I (Viva Records, 2001)
- Janno Live Viva's & I (Viva Records, 2002)
- Seven (GMA Music, 2004)
- Seven Special Edition (GMA Music, 2005)
- Little Boy (GMA Music, 2007)
- ORIG (GMA Music, 2008)
- Novela (GMA Music, 2014)
- Nagbabalik (GMA Music, 2018)

=== Compilations ===
- Janno Gibbs 40th Anniversary Collection (Vicor Music, 2004)
- Silver Series (Viva Records, 2006)
- The Janno Gibbs Anthology (GMA Music, 2010)

=== Singles ===
- "Fallin'" (Full House theme song)
- "Ikaw Lamang" – duet with Jaya (Original by Zsa Zsa Padilla and covered by Piolo Pascual for the theme song of ABS-CBN primetime drama Sa Piling Mo)
- "Kung Mamahalin Mo Lang Ako" (Theme song of Kung Mamahalin Mo Lang Ako)
- "Kung Tayo'y Magkakalayo" (Original by Rey Valera)
- "Umagang Kay Ganda" (Original by Ray Ann Fuentes ft. Tillie Moreno)
- "Sana Dalawa Ang Puso Ko" (Original by Bodjie Dasig)
- "Kapantay Ay Langit" duet with the cover singer Asia's Queen Of Songs Pilita Corrales)
- "Heart of Mine" (Original by Boz Scaggs)
- "Ipagpatawad Mo" (Original by VST and Co., now covered by Mayonnaise)
- "Together, Forever" (Theme song of Forever)
- "Sa Iyong Mundo" (Theme song of Kambal Sirena)
- "Ikaw, Ako at Siya" – duet with Jaya & Julie Anne San Jose (theme song of Ang Dalawang Mrs. Real)
- "Pari 'Koy" (Theme song of Pari 'Koy)
- "Weyt a Minit, Kapeng Mainit" – with Blakdyak† (theme song of Weyt a Minit, Kapeng Mainit)
- "Get It On" (released on September 16, 2016, on all digital platforms like Spotify and iTunes by GMA Records)
- "My Jagiya" – duet with Denise Barbacena/Manilyn Reynes (theme song of My Korean Jagiya)
- "Oh Girl" – featuring Andrew E. (released on November 8, 2017, on all digital stores like Spotify and iTunes by GMA Records)
- "Feeling JKL" (released on October 10, 2018, on all digital stores like Spotify and iTunes by Star Music)
- "Walang Kupas" (released on July 19, 2019, on all digital stores like Spotify and iTunes by Viva Records)
- "Pangmalakasan" (released on May 7, 2021, on all digital stores like Spotify and Apple Music by Viva Records)
- "Pag-Ibig Kong Tunay" (released on September 3, 2021, on all digital stores like Spotify and Apple Music by Viva Records)
- "Future Lover" (released on September 16, 2022, on all digital stores like Spotify and Apple Music by Viva Records)
- "Kung Hindi Susubukan" (released on April 19, 2023, on all digital stores like Spotify and Apple Music by Viva Records)
- "Sige Na, Sorry" (released on May 24, 2024, on all digital stores like Spotify and Apple Music by Viva Records)
- "Pinay Pa Rin" (released on May 15, 2026 on all digital stores like Spotify and Apple Music by GMA Music)
- "Nung Ikaw Ay Akin" (released on November 20, 2026 on all digital stores like Spotify and Apple Music by GMA Music)

== Filmography ==
=== Film ===
Year	Title	Role	Note(s)	Ref(s).
1986	Kalabog en Bosyo Strike Again			
1986	Payaso			
1987	Jack en Poy: Hale-Hale Hoy!			
1987	Puto	Juanito		
1988	Wake Up Little Susie	Janno Bravo		
1988	Super Inday and the Golden Bibe			
1990	Hindi Ka Na Sisikatan ng Araw: Kapag Puno Na ang Salop Part-III			
1992	Mahirap Maging Pogi	Siano		
1994	Ang Pagbabalik ni Pedro Penduko	Pedro Penduko		
1994	Ober Da Bakod: The Movie	Mokong		
1995	Ang Syota Kong Balikbayan			
1996	Ober Da Bakod 2: Da Treasure Adbentyur	Mokong		
1996	Hindi Ako Ander! (Itanong Mo Kay Kumander)	Tomas		
2000	Pedro Penduko: Episode II – The Return of the Comeback	Pedro Penduko		
2000	Juan & Ted: Wanted	Juancho		
2001	Tusong Twosome	Gantso		
2019	Sanggano, Sanggago't Sanggwapo	Johnny		
2020	Pakboys Takusa	Justine		
2021	Sanggano, Sanggago’t Sanggwapo 2: Aussie! Aussie (O Sige)	Johnny		
2021	Mang Jose	Mang Jose		
2022	Yorme: The Isko Domagoso Story	German Moreno		
2023	Hello Universe!	Ariel		
2024	Itutumba Ka ng Tatay Ko	Teteng	Also director	
2025	Nasaan si Hesus			
2026	Breast Friends Forever			

=== Television series ===
- Teen Pan Alley (1986–1988)
- That's Entertainment (1986)
- Lovingly Yours
- Spotlight
- GMA Telecine Specials
- GMA Love Stories
- Maalaala Mo Kaya: Sweater (1991)
- Love Notes
- Alabang Girls The Comedy Series
- Ober Da Bakod (1992–1997)
- Small Brothers – Host
- Maalaala Mo Kaya: Kuwerdas (1995)
- Oki Doki Doc - Guest Role (1996)
- ASAP Natin 'To – Guest Performer (1996; 2017–present)
- Gillage People
- Manoy & Mokong (1997–1998)
- Young Love, Sweet Love
- GMA Supershow (1988–1997)
- Beh! Bote Nga! (1999–2003)
- Magpakailanman: The Ricky Reyes Story
- Nuts Entertainment (2003–2008)
- Marinara (2004–2005)
- Lupin – Inspector Clavio Angeles (2007)
- SOP (Sobrang Okey Pare) (1997–2010)
- Eat Bulaga! (2001–2007)
- Eat Bulaga's Holy Week Special (2002–2006)
- Kakasa Ka Ba Sa Grade 5? (2007–2009)
- Codename: Asero – Geron Aguilar/Agent Rock Star (2008)
- Power of 10 (2009)
- Party Pilipinas (2010–2013)
- Pilyang Kerubin – San Pedro (2010)
- Protégé: The Battle for the Big Break – Mentor
- Alice Bungisngis and her Wonder Walis – Hilario Asuncion
- Sunday All Stars – Host (2013–2015)
- Pyra: Babaeng Apoy – Aidan
- Paraiso Ko'y Ikaw – Salvador "Badong / Bads" Carriedo (2014)
- My BFF – Christian Garcia (2014)
- Tunay na Buhay – Himself (2014)
- Happy Truck ng Bayan – Host (2015–2016)
- Happy Truck HAPPinas – Host (2016)
- HAPPinas Happy Hour – Host (2016)
- Meant to Be – Adonis Adlawan (2017)
- FPJ's Ang Probinsyano – Bruno Moreno (guest character) (November 2017 – January 2018)
- Wowowin – Himself (2020)
- Happy Time – Host (NET25, 2020–2021)
- Puto - Juanito (2021)
- Da Pers Family – Atasha's suitor (guest)
- Wow Mani – Main host (VMX, 2025)
- Totoy Bato – Engr. Arko Perez (2025–2026)

=== Television special ===
- GMA @ 45: The GMA 45th Anniversary TV Special
- That's Entertainment Anniversary Special
- Ryan Cayabyab: The Music Man @ 50
- No. 1 @ 55: The GMA 55th Anniversary TV Special
- Philippine Idol Grand Finals Special
- SOP Anniversary Special
- Eat Bulaga! Silver Special
- Party Pilipinas Anniversary Special
- GMA @ 60: The Heart Of Television TV Special
- Thank You Kapuso 2015: GMA @ 65 TV Special
- The Voice Teens Philippines Grand Finals 201
- It's Showtime 8th Anniversary Magpasikat 2017 Season 8

== Awards and nominations ==
Year	Award giving body	Category	Nominated work	Results
2000	Awit Awards	Best Performance by a Duet	"Ikaw Lamang" with Jaya	Won
2000	PMPC Star Awards for Television	Best Male TV Host	S.O.P	Won
2008	Awit Awards	Best Dance Recording	"Sexy Mama"	Nominated
2008	MYX Music Awards	Favorite Male Artist	—N/a	Nominated
2009	Eastwood City Walk of Fame	Celebrity Inductee	—N/a	Won
