= Denis Haines =

Musical artist (born 1957)

Dennis Haines
- Also known as: Francis Haines
- Born: 1957 (age 68–69); Barnet, London, England
- Genres: Rock, new wave
- Instrument: Keyboards
- Years active: 1983-present

Denis Haines is an English musician, best known for his tenure as keyboardist for the Hollies between 1983 and 1991. Haines first came to prominence with new wave band the Doll. He played keyboards for Gary Numan on the album Telekon. Together with Chris Payne, Rrussell Bell and Cedric Sharpley, all of whom had been members of Numan's backing band, he formed new wave band Dramatis in 1981.

After leaving the Hollies, he focused on composing music for film and television, under the name Francis Haines. Haines produced and arranged the album Resurgence, which former Hollies lead singer Allan Clarke released on BMG in September 2019.
