= Kung Mamahalin Mo Lang Ako =

Philippine television drama series

- Title card
- Also known as: If Only You Love Me
- Genre: Romantic drama
- Directed by: Ruel S. Bayani
- Starring: Marian Rivera; Ehra Madrigal; Camille Prats
- Opening theme: "Kung Mamahalin Mo Lang Ako" by Janno Gibbs
- Country of origin: Philippines
- Original language: Tagalog
- No. of episodes: 135

Production
- Executive producers: Antonio P. Tuviera; Malou Choa-Fagar
- Producer: Antonio P. Tuviera
- Camera setup: Multiple-camera setup
- Running time: 30–45 minutes
- Production company: TAPE Inc.

Original release
- Network: GMA Network
- Release: August 15, 2005 – February 17, 2006

Kung Mamahalin Mo Lang Ako (trans. / international title: If Only You Love Me) is a Philippine television drama romance series broadcast by GMA Network. Directed by Ruel S. Bayani, it stars Marian Rivera, Ehra Madrigal, and Camille Prats. It premiered on August 15, 2005, on the network's Dramarama sa Hapon line up. The series concluded on February 17, 2006, with a total of 135 episodes.

== Cast and characters ==
Cast

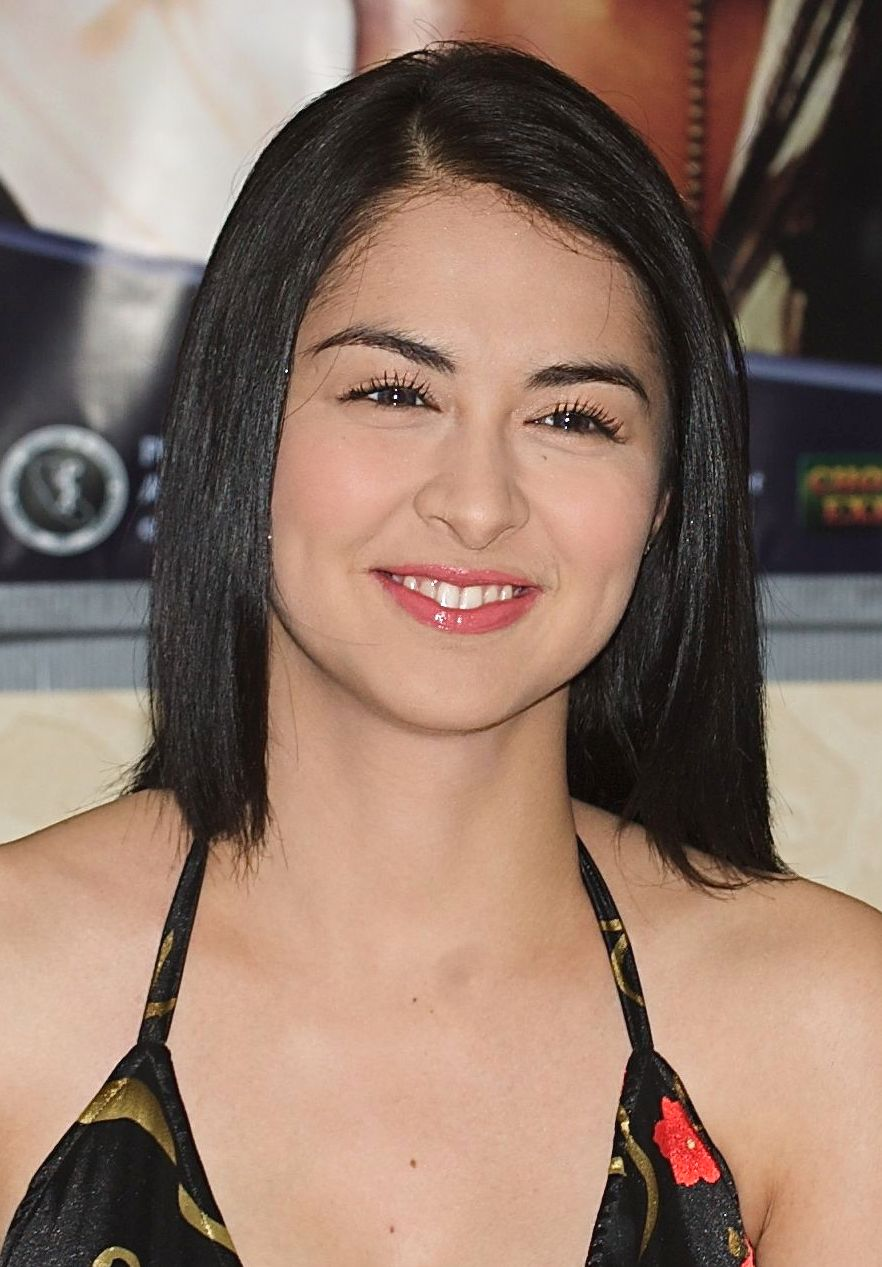
Marian Rivera

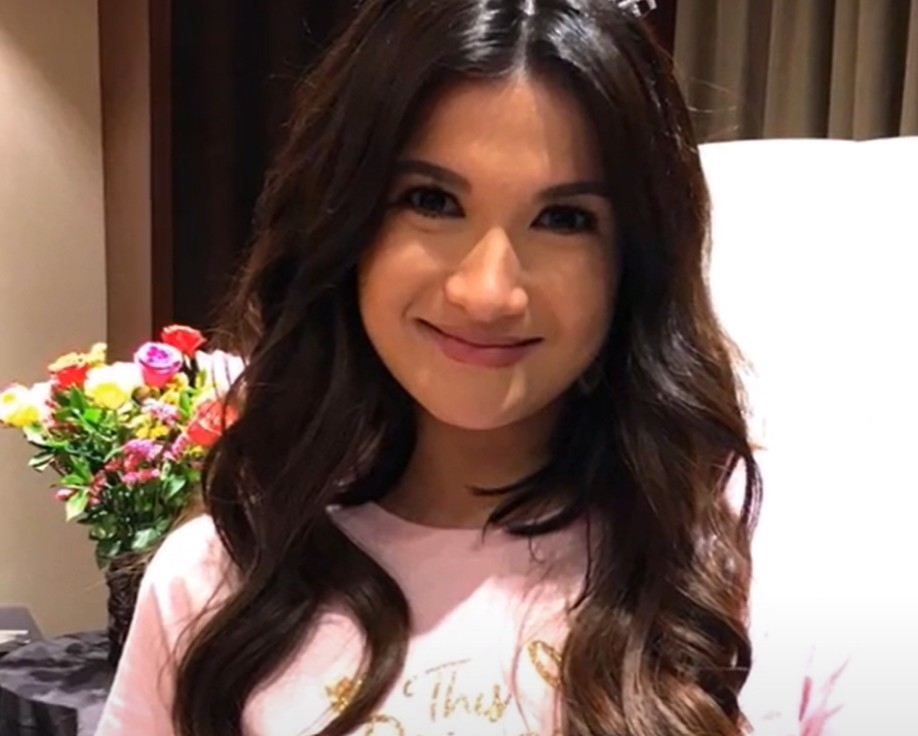
Camille Prats

Lead cast

- Marian Rivera as Clarisse Pelaez
- Ehra Madrigal as Vanessa
- Camille Prats as Joyce

Supporting cast

- Oyo Boy Sotto as Segismundo "Sig" Lariza
- Keempee de Leon as Alfonse Lariza
- AJ Eigenmann as Gilbert
- Bing Loyzaga as Amanda Lariza
- Joseph Izon as Jerome
- Chinggay Riego as Mrs. Oliver
- Hermes Gacutan as Rudolph
- John Apacible
- Lara Melissa de Leon as Eleanor
- Anne Villegas as Emilia
- Gina Alajar
- Tommy Abuel as Enrique
- Symon Soler
- Sheila Marie Rodriguez
- Gio Alvarez
- Bobby Andrews
