= Mang Jose (film) =

2021 film directed by Raynier Brizuela

- Official release poster
- Directed by: Raynier Brizuela
- Screenplay by: Carl Joseph Papa
- Story by: Raynier Brizuela; Carl Joseph Papa
- Produced by: Dan Villegas; Antoinette Jadaone; Veronique Del Rosario-Corpus; Vincent Del Rosario III
- Starring: Janno Gibbs; Mikoy Morales; Bing Loyzaga; Manilyn Reynes; Jerald Napoles
- Cinematography: Theo Lozada
- Edited by: Nikolas Red
- Music by: Axel Fernandez
- Production companies: Viva Films; Project 8 Projects
- Distributed by: Viva Films; Vivamax
- Release dates: November 17, 2021 (Philippines); July 11, 2021 (BiFan)
- Running time: 90 minutes
- Country: Philippines
- Language: Filipino

Mang Jose is a 2021 Philippine superhero comedy film written by Carl Joseph Papa and directed by Raynier Brizuela. It stars Janno Gibbs, Mikoy Morales, Bing Loyzaga, Jerald Napoles and Manilyn Reynes. The film is inspired by a Parokya ni Edgar song of the same title.

== Plot ==
It always pays to be good. And for superhero-in-hiding Mang Jose, it is quite literal. Having the ability of energy absorption & redirection, he covertly saves people only if they rent him out.

One day, carefree young man Tope rents Mang Jose to help him save his mother who has been abducted by mysterious troopers of King Ina, an enigmatic cunning villainess who is out there to annihilate all remaining superheroes in hiding.

Little do Mang Jose and Tope know the quest would lead them to pay the terrible price in order to save the priceless truth binding them: family.

== Cast ==
=== Main ===
- Janno Gibbs as Mang Jose
- Mikoy Morales as Tope
- Bing Loyzaga as Tina
- Manilyn Reynes as King Ina
- Jerald Napoles as Charlemagne

=== Supporting ===
- Leo Martinez as Marcelo
- Gab Lagman as Lance
- Leo Bruno as Lando
- Ronaldo Valdez as Super Lapu-Lapu
- Michael V. as Kumander Andres
- Kim Molina as Sultana Kudarat
- Andrew E. as Mount Apolinario
- Lito Lapid as Inkredibol Diego
- Yassi Pressman as Gabriela Maginaw
- Tads Obach as Tope's Friend
- Edna Vida as Aling Ida
- Princess Izha Feliciano as King Ina's Daughter
- Milo Elmido Jr. as Front Desk Officer
- James Caraan as TV Pageant Host
- Alwyn Uytingco as Lance (voice)
- John Kyle Rosales as Turbo Rat
- Raymond Villaraza as Chinese Thug
- Raffy Samoranos as Chinese Thug
- Charmaine Alovera as Cappuccino Girl
- Axel Fernandez as Bar Bully
- Nathaniel Pelareja as Bar Bully
- Mareck Jingco as Bar Bully
- Janzeil Siachongco as Cemetery People
- Nyle Libranza as Cemetery People
- Emmanuel Dela Cruz as Cemetery People

== Release ==
The film premiered at Bucheon International Fantastic Film Festival on July 11, 2021, and it was released at the Philippines on November 17, 2021, via Vivamax Plus. The film was originally set for theatrical release for November 10, once the cinemas opened.

== Reception ==
JE CC of LionhearTV rated the film 3 out of 5 and wrote:

Comedy and action blend beautifully in this Vivamax feature that takes on the superhero genre with distinctly Filipino sensibilities. In this film, the titular Mang Jose demands payment from those he helps.

== Soundtrack ==
Mang Jose (Original soundtrack from the Vivamax movie)

Soundtrack album by Janno Gibbs
- Released: November 12, 2021
- Recorded: 2021
- Length: 14:22
- Label: Viva Records (Philippines)

Mang Jose track listing
No.	Title	Artist	Length
1.	"Mang Jose"	Parokya ni Edgar	5:12
2.	"Mang Jose"	Janno Gibbs	3:10
3.	"Mang Jose"	Axel Fernandez
4.	"Halina Kay King Ina"	Aimee Grace Bautista

- Mang Jose

Composed and written by Chito Miranda (as Chito Miranda Jr.) Interpreted by Parokya ni Edgar Published and administered by Universal Records, Inc.

- Mang Jose

Composed and written by Chito Miranda (as Chito Miranda Jr.) Interpreted by Axel Fernandez Published and administered by Runt Collective.

- Mang Jose

Composed and written by Chito Miranda (as Chito Miranda Jr.) Interpreted by Janno Gibbs Published and administered by Universal Records, Inc.

- Halina Kay King Ina

Arranged by Axel Fernandez Performed by Aimee Grace Bautista Published and administered by Runt Collective Used with permission.
