= Doll (surname) =

Doll (English, German: dweller at a division of land or boundary mark; descendant of Doll, a pet form of names beginning with Dult (patience), as Dultwic and Duldfrid) is a surname. Notable people with the surname include:

- Andrea Doll (born 1940), American politician
- Anton Eduard Doll (1826–1887), German painter
- Birgit Doll (1958–2015), Austrian actress and theatre director
- Bob Doll (1919–1959), American basketball player
- Charles Fitzroy Doll (1850–1929), British architect
- Dotty Doll (born 1936), American politician
- Henri George Doll (1902–1991), French scientist
- Henry W. Doll (1870–?), New York politician
- Mordaunt Doll (1888–1966), English cricketer
- Richard Doll (1912–2005), English biostatistician
- Steve Doll (1960–2009), American professional wrestler
- Tanner Doll (born 1993), Canadian gridiron football long snapper
- Thomas Doll (born 1966), German footballer and coach
