= Dols =

Dols may refer to:

- DoLS, Deprivation of Liberty Safeguards, in the UK's Mental Capacity Act 2005
- Heliodoro Dols (1933–2025), Spanish architect
- Keanan Dols (born 1998), Jamaican swimmer
- Willy Dols (1911–1944), Dutch linguist
- DOLS, sometimes an abbreviation for Dollars such as on checks/cheques where space is limited

== See also ==
- Dol (disambiguation)
- Dolls (disambiguation)
