= Dolls (disambiguation) =

A doll is a model of a human being, usually a toy.

Dolls or The Dolls may also refer to:

== Film and TV ==
- Le bambole (translated: The Dolls), a 1965 Italian film
- Dolls (1987 film), a 1987 film directed by Stuart Gordon
- Dolls (2002 film), a 2002 film by Takeshi Kitano
- Dolls (2006 film), short British film directed by Susan Luciani
- Dolls (2013 film), a 2013 Malayalam drama film directed by Shalil Kallur
- Dolls (1995 manga), a manga series by Yumiko Kawahara

== Video games and pixel art ==
- Dollz, pixel art of dolls dressed in various outfits
- Dolls (Street Fighter), video game characters in the Street Fighter series

== Music ==
- The Dolls, a working name for Destiny's Child before they settled on their current name
- The Dolls, Swedish studio singers who backed Nova in the 1973 Eurovision Song Contest
- "The Dolls" colloquially, to any of the following bands:
  - The Dresden Dolls, an American musical duo from Boston, Massachusetts
  - New York Dolls, formed 1971, rock band (proto-punk etc.)
  - Pussycat Dolls, formed 1995, girl group from Los Angeles

=== Songs ===
- "Dolls", a song by Ayumi Hamasaki on the album Rainbow
- "Dolls", a song by Crystal Castles from Alice Practice EP, 2006
- "Dolls", or "Dolls (Sweet Rock and Roll)", a song by Primal Scream, 2006
- "Dolls", a song by Bella Poarch, 2022

== See also ==
- Doll (disambiguation)
- Dols (disambiguation)
