= 2nd Miracle in Cell No. 7 (2024 film) =

- Directed by: Herwin Novianto
- Screenplay by: Alim Sudio
- Story by: Alim Sudio
- Produced by: Frederica
- Starring: Graciella Abigail; Denny Sumargo; Indro Warkop; Tora Sudiro; Rigen Rakelna; Indra Jegel; Bryan Domani; Marsha Timothy; Vino G. Bastian
- Cinematography: Nur Hidayat
- Edited by: Sentot Sahid
- Music by: Purwacaraka
- Production company: Falcon Pictures
- Release date: December 25, 2024
- Running time: 147 minutes
- Country: Indonesia
- Language: Indonesian

2nd Miracle in Cell No. 7 is a 2024 Indonesian drama film directed by Herwin Novianto. It is the prequel to the 2022 film Miracle in Cell No. 7. It is an original prequel to the 2013 South Korean film, Miracle in Cell No. 7 by Lee Hwan-kyung.

== Plot ==
Kartika visits the prison where her father Dodo was imprisoned. However she is oblivious to the fact that her father was already executed. (Note: As depicted in the epilogue of Miracle in Cell No. 7 (2022)). Dodo's cellmates however, conceals Dodo's death a secret from Kartika. Meanwhile, the head of prison Hendro plans to adopt Kartika as his child.

== Cast ==
- Vino G. Bastian as Dodo Rozak, Juwita's husband and Kartika's father.
- Graciella Abigail as Kartika Rozak, daughter of Dodo Rozak and Juwita.
- Marsha Timothy as Juwita "Ibu Uwi", Dodo Rozak's wife and Kartika's mother.
- Indro Warkop as Japra "Foreman" Effendi.
- Tora Sudiro as Zaki
- Rigen Rakelna as Yunus "Bewok"
- Indra Jegel as Atmo "Gepeng"
- Bryan Domani as Asrul "Bule"
- Denny Sumargo as Hendro Sanusi, Head of Prison, husband Linda, and adoptive father Kartika.
- Muhadkly Acho as Mr. Hengky
- Coki Pardede as Amat
- Agla Artalidia as Linda, Hendro's wife and Kartika's adoptive mother.
- Ayushita as Kemala Wibisono
- Iedil Dzuhrie Alaudin as William "Willy" Wibisono
- Della Dartyan as Sarah Batara, Hendro's lawyer.
- Yati Surachman as Ibu Anik
- Restu Sinaga as Mr. Anwar
- Elly D. Luthan as Head of the Foundation
- Nugie as suami pertama Juwita
- Rizky Hanggono as Pengacara Dinas Sosial
- Piet Pagau as Hakim Ketua
- Agus Kencrot as Mr. Agus
- Megarita as Ibu Poppy
- Keanu Azka as Barak

== Production ==
2nd Miracle in Cell No. 7 is a prequel to the 2022 film, Miracle in Cell No. 7 which in turn is an adaptation of the 2013 South Korean film of the same name by Lee Hwan-kyung.

2nd Miracle is an original prequel for the film, with the original South Korean film not having an additional installment in its storyline. Alim Sudio wrote the script for the prequel which took 1.5 years to complete, although Sudio did coordinated with Lee for the story.

== Release ==
2nd Miracle in Cell No. 7 premiered in Indonesian cinemas on December 25 2024.
