= Itutumba Ka ng Tatay Ko =

2024 Philippine action comedy film by Janno Gibbs

- Theatrical release poster
- Directed by: Janno Gibbs
- Screenplay by: Charrie M. Avendaño; Joma Labayen
- Story by: Janno Gibbs
- Produced by: Vincent del Rosario III; Veronique del Rosario-Corpus
- Starring: Janno Gibbs; Xia Vigor
- Edited by: Vanessa de Leon
- Production company: Viva Films
- Distributed by: Viva Films
- Release date: January 24, 2024
- Running time: 109 minutes
- Country: Philippines
- Language: Filipino

Itutumba Ka ng Tatay Ko (transl. My Dad Will Knock You Down) is a 2024 Philippine action comedy film directed by Janno Gibbs, who developed the story concept and made his directorial debut, and screenplay written by Charrie M. Avendaño and Joma Labayen. It stars Gibbs and Xia Vigor in lead roles.

Produced and distributed by Viva Films, the film was released theatrically in the Philippines on January 24, 2024.

== Plot ==
Teteng is a widower who works as a personal assistant to a film director, Diamante, and lives with his teenage daughter, Tintin, in a rented apartment. A timid person, he is unable to express his romantic feelings towards Tintin's teacher, Mylene, and is constantly bullied by everyone around him, including his landlady, Bebang, a group of drunks who pester him to join their drinking session, Tintin's bully Ethan, Ethan's father, and Diamante, who makes him do multiple chores and hires him as an extra to do extreme bit roles. Teteng later reveals that he refuses to fight back out of fear that he would end up like his father, who left him after his violent nature led to a shooting at their home that killed his mother.

After Teteng humiliates Tintin by promising to confront Ethan's bullying, only to grovel in front of Ethan and his father, Tintin expresses lashes out and expresses her resentment at him. Stressed out by his routine of being bullied, Teteng gradually falls ill with what he initially assumes to be migraine, only to be informed by an attending doctor that he would die in seven days from a brain tumor. In despair, Teteng locks himself in his room.

The next day, Teteng wakes up and takes on a more belligerent image and outfit. He beats up Bebang for pestering him about his rent, followed by the drunks, prompting them to finally leave him alone. He also gains Tintin and Mylene's respect by beating up both Ethan and his father, revealing that Ethan is bullying Tintin because he has a crush on her. Teteng also stands up to a man constantly cutting his queue to buy Diamante's coffee and brands a barista who constantly misspells his name, before spilling the coffee at Diamante and calling him out for his abusive behavior as he quits working for him. Teteng also becomes confident enough to express his feelings for Mylene, who in turn is more shy in reciprocating.

At a nightclub in which Teteng's best friend, Tikboy, works as a bartender, Teteng beats up a group of patrons constantly ganging up on the club’s dancer Ivana. The group leaves while their leader, the son of a syndicate Boss, is hospitalized, enraging the latter. Teteng uses a stash of cash left behind by the syndicate at the bar to convince Ivana to leave the nightclub and find a better life, while Teteng, Tintin, Mylene and Tikboy go on a beach holiday, during which Tintin is abducted by the Boss.

Teteng is told by the Boss to see him in exchange for Tintin's life. Teteng then finds his father and retrieves his firearms as they reconcile. Teteng, his father and Tikboy then assault the syndicate headquarters, defeating the Boss and his men. While engaging in a shootout, Teteng receives a call from his doctor, who tells him he had been misdiagnosed and is actually healthy all along. Sometime later, Teteng introduces his father to Tintin, but is interrupted when a group of hecklers mock his relationship with Mylene, prompting him to prepare and confront them.

== Cast ==
- Janno Gibbs as Teteng
- Xia Vigor as Tintin
- Mark Anthony Fernandez
- Louise delos Reyes
- Robb Guinto
- Ronnie Henares
- Jeric Raval
- Anjo Yllana
- Julianna Parizcova Segovia
- Ronaldo Valdez

== Production ==
In April 2023, Philippine Entertainment Portal reported that Janno Gibbs was working on his film under the working title Top Secret; this would also mark his directorial debut. That September, further details of the film was announced, including the film's title being revealed as Itutumba Ka ng Tatay Ko, and that Gibbs would star alongside Xia Vigor. According to Gibbs, he paid homage to actors Fernando Poe Jr. and Dolphy while working on the film. He said, "But I have a lot of scenes here in ‘Itutumba Ka ng Tatay Ko’ honoring FPJ. My character, Teteng, sa bahay pa lang, may posters na ni FPJ, sa kuwarto ko – ‘Hindi Ka na Sisikatan ng Araw’ and ‘Mabuting Kaibigan, Masamang Kaaway.’ Half of the movie was Dolphy. Half was FPJ." It was later confirmed that Gibbs's father, Ronaldo Valdez, would make a posthumous appearance in the film. Further cast members have been revealed, including Louise delos Reyes, Anjo Yllana, and Julianna Parizcova Segovia.

== Reception ==
It received mixed reviews according to review aggregator website Kritikultura, garnering a score of 58/100.

Goldwin Reviews gave it 2 out of 5 stars and wrote, "Kahit may pagkukulang sa ilang mga bagay, nagpatuloy lang sila sa pagkwento. Naging tapat ang mga aktor sa kanilang pagganap. Hindi sila napagod na magbigay ng mga jokes."

== Release ==
Itutumba Ka ng Tatay Ko was released in the Philippines on January 24, 2024. The film was previously scheduled for a November 2023 release date. The film's released date went ahead despite the death of Ronaldo Valdez on December 17. According to Gibbs, he said that it was the "perfect time" to release the film "so that the people will see his father in a new light after what happened". Gibbs also dedicated the film to his father Valdez.
