= Miracle in Cell No. 7 (2022 film) =

- Theatrical release poster
- Directed by: Hanung Bramantyo
- Screenplay by: Alim Sudio
- Based on: Miracle in Cell No. 7 by: Lee Hwan-kyung; Yoo Young-ah; Kim Hwang-sung; Kim Young-seok
- Produced by: Frederica
- Starring: Vino G. Bastian; Graciella Abigail; Indro; Tora Sudiro; Rigen Rakelna; Indra Jegel; Bryan Domani; Denny Sumargo; Mawar de Jongh
- Cinematography: Yunus Pasolang
- Edited by: Sentot Sahid
- Music by: Purwacaraka
- Production company: Falcon Pictures
- Release dates: September 8, 2022 (Indonesia); October 27, 2022 (Malaysia)
- Running time: 145 minutes
- Country: Indonesia
- Language: Indonesian

Miracle in Cell No. 7 is a 2022 Indonesian family comedy film directed by Hanung Bramantyo based on the 2013 South Korean film. The film, produced by Falcon Pictures, stars Vino G. Bastian, Graciella Abigail, and Indro. Miracle in Cell No. 7 was theatrically released in Indonesia on September 8, 2022.

== Plot ==
Dodo Rozak is a 20-year-old balloon seller with an intellectual disability who raises his young daughter, Ika Kartika, alone. In 2002, he witnessed a motorbike fatally strike the pet dog of Melati Wibisono, a child from a wealthy family. Dodo’s distressed reaction is misinterpreted, and he is falsely accused of killing the animal. When Melati flees in fear, she trips and falls into a swimming pool. Dodo attempts to rescue her, removing her wet clothing in accordance with advice once given by his late wife. Arriving too late to understand what occurred, the household staff accused him of murder and sexual assault. Under police pressure and intense media scrutiny, Dodo is coerced into a false confession.

Imprisoned, Dodo is subjected to harsh treatment by officers and the prison warden, Hendro Sanusi, who views him as uncooperative and intellectually incapable. He is assigned to Cell Seven, where he befriends fellow inmates Japra, Zaki, Yunus, Atmo, and Asrul. When Kartika’s school is invited to perform at the prison, the inmates secretly arrange for her to visit her father in the cell. The discovery of this breach results in Dodo’s isolation and Kartika’s placement in an orphanage.

After Dodo saves Hendro during a prison fire, the warden begins to reconsider his assumptions. Recognizing Dodo’s sincerity and confusion rather than malice, Hendro returns him to Cell Seven and allows Kartika limited contact, even taking her into his own home during visiting periods. Hendro later gathers evidence and submits an appeal. However, Melati’s father, William, returns as governor and strengthens child-protection laws, further diminishing Dodo’s prospects for release.

Aware of Dodo’s difficulty in expressing himself, the inmates help him prepare a statement for court. His lawyer, Ruslan, warns him that Kartika’s safety depends on maintaining his confession. At trial, William destroys Dodo’s prepared testimony, and the coerced confession leads to a death sentence. Dodo is escorted to his execution, as prisoners and guards bid him farewell. Kartika, only gradually understanding what has occurred, loses her father.

In 2019, Kartika—now an adult and a lawyer—reopens the case. She summons Japra and the former inmates to testify and is supported by Hendro. Presenting new evidence, including autopsy results showing no signs of physical or sexual violence, she argues that Dodo’s conviction exemplifies systemic injustice against people with disabilities. The court overturns the verdict and declares Dodo not guilty.

As Kartika stands outside the prison gates, she envisions her father rising into the sky in a hot-air balloon, fulfilling his dream of “flying” to reunite with his late wife—a symbolic image marking both his freedom and his absence.

== Cast ==
- Vino G. Bastian as Dodo Rozak
- Graciella Abigail as Ika Kartika Rozak
  - Mawar Eva de Jongh as an adult Kartika
- Indro as Japra Effendi: Prison Gang Leader /Foreman
- Tora Sudiro as Zaki
- Rigen Rakelna as Yunus / Bewok
- Indra Jegel as Atmo / Gepeng
- Bryan Domani as Asrul / Bule
- Denny Sumargo as Hendro Sanusi
- Agla Artalidia as Linda
- Marsha Timothy as Juwita's mother
- Agoes Kencrot as Agus
- Coki Pardede as Amat
- Rifnu Wikana as Okto
- Iedil Dzuhrie Alaudin as William Wibisono / Willy
- Nadila Ernesta as Sonya Wibisono
- Makayla Rose as Melati Wibisono
- Sheila Dara Aisha as Widi's teacher
- Yatti Surachman as Anik's mother
- Rukman Rosadi as Ruslan / Dodo's lawyer
- Vinessa Inez as Meta / Zaki's wife

=== Cameo ===
- Angie Ang as a female Reporter
- Uli Herdinansyah as news anchor
- Tretan Muslim as a thug police
- Joshua Pandelaki as a judge in 2019
- Otig Pakis as a judge in 2002
- Tommy Suharto as a prosecutor in 2019
- Fredy Amin as a prosecutor in 2002
- Fuad Idris as Warno
- Denny Chandra as Head of the Investigation Unit
- Dara Asvia as Atmo's girlfriend
- Asyafa Bilqis S. as Madonna
- Avan Sanjaya as Driver Willy

== Soundtrack ==
- "Andaikan Kau Datang" by Andmesh Kamaleng
- "Balon Udara" by the cast of Miracle in Cell No. 7
- "I'tiraf" by T&T Children's Choir
- "Shalawat Nabiyah" by T&T Children's Choir

== Release ==
Miracle in Cell No. 7 was released in Indonesia on September 8, 2022. It was also released digitally on Amazon Prime Video on April 20, 2023. SCTV acquired the film's broadcasting rights, premiering it on August 24, 2024.

== Prequel ==
An original prequel, 2nd Miracle in Cell No. 7 was released on December 25, 2024. Alim Sudio with coordination with original Miracle in Cell No. 7 creator Lee Hwan-kyung wrote the script for the prequel.
