= Dollmaker =

A dollmaker is a maker of dolls.

Doll maker or Dollmaker may also refer to:

- Doll maker (Internet)
- The Dollmaker (1984), made-for-TV movie
- Dollmaker (character), the comic book character
- The Dollmaker (novel), novel by Harriette Arnow
