= The Doll (2015 film) =

- Poster
- Chinese: 诡娃娃
- Directed by: Liu Chongchong
- Production companies: Hubei Changjiang Media; Beijing Lingle Dongfang Entertainment; Beijing Youlong Entertainment
- Distributed by: Zhejiang Dongyang April Day Entertainment
- Release date: December 18, 2015
- Running time: 90 minutes
- Country: China
- Language: Mandarin
- Box office: CN¥2.83 million

The Doll is a 2015 Chinese horror film directed by Liu Chongchong. It was released in China on December 18, 2015.

== Cast ==
- Xu Dongmei
- Zhang Xu
- Yang Yang
- Xie Yuan

== Reception ==
The film has grossed CN¥2.83 million in China.
