= Dotty Doll =

American politician (born 1936)

Dotty Doll (born July 20, 1936, Chicago, Illinois) is an American politician who was elected to the Missouri House of Representatives. She was first elected to the Missouri House of Representatives in 1974, representing the 29th Missouri house district. Doll was educated at the Chicago Teachers College and the University of Missouri–Kansas City.
