= Puto (film) =

1987 teen comedy film starring Herbert Bautista

- Theatrical release poster
- Directed by: Leroy Salvador
- Written by: Amado L. Lacuesta Jr.
- Produced by: Ramon Salvador
- Starring: Herbert Bautista; Janno Gibbs; Mia Prats; Dennis Da Silva; Bing Loyzaga; Jigo Garcia; Gelie de Belen; Jayjay Salvador; Cathy Mora
- Cinematography: Joe Batac Jr.
- Edited by: Ike Jarlego Jr.
- Music by: Mon del Rosario
- Production company: Viva Films
- Release date: November 4, 1987
- Running time: 97 minutes
- Country: Philippines
- Language: Filipino

Puto is a 1987 Filipino teen fantasy comedy film directed by Leroy Salvador and starring Herbert Bautista as the titular character, alongside Janno Gibbs, Mia Prats, Dennis Da Silva, Bing Loyzaga, Jigo Garcia, Gelie de Belen, Jayjay Salvador, and Cathy Mora. It is Bautista's first film to feature him in the solo lead role. Produced by Viva Films, the film was released on November 4, 1987, and was a box office success.

Luciano E. Soriano gave the film a mixed review, praising Bautista's performance while having middling feelings about the supporting cast and some gaps in logic.

== Plot ==
Ivanhoe "Puto" de la Cruz is a young puto vendor who dreams of being with Gina, his classmate at the Andres Bonifacio High School. After accidentally rescuing three little elves (Elvis, Boy George, and Travolta), he is granted a week-long chance to wish for anything he wants., culminating in the rescue of Gina from a band of kidnappers. Puto's powers expire during a running competition, but he manages to win fair and square, gaining the respect of everyone in school.

== Cast ==
- Herbert Bautista as Ivanhoe "Puto" de la Cruz
- Janno Gibbs as Juanito
- Mia Prats as Gina
- Dennis Da Silva as Danny
- Bing Loyzaga as Tere
- Jigo Garcia as Sonny
- Gelie de Belen as Mindy
- Jayjay Salvador as Charlie
- Cathy Mora as Kathy
- Marita Zobel as Aling Loleng
- Berting Labra as Travolta
- Max Alvarado as Elvis
- Cachupoy as Boy George
- Chris Villanueva as Johnny

== Release ==
Puto was given a "G" rating by the Movie and Television Review and Classification Board (MTRCB), which stands for "General Patronage", and was released by Viva Films on November 4, 1987. The film was a success at the box office.

=== Critical response ===
Luciano E. Soriano of the Manila Standard gave the film a mixed review, questioning some of the film's gaps in logic such as whether the school attended by Puto, a poor vendor, is public despite the presence of rich students, as well as why the elves need someone to rescue them when they can transform into animals and easily escape. Soriano also wrote that the film's situations "are standard fare among youth-oriented movies", and that the supporting cast were unmemorable in their roles, though he commended Bautista by stating that "it is as clear as daylight that this is Bautista's show all the way."
