= Bing Loyzaga =

Filipina actress and singer

- Born: Carla Victoria Cuerva Loyzaga; April 9, 1970 (age 56); Metro Manila, Philippines
- Other name: Bing Loyzaga Gibbs
- Occupations: Actress, singer
- Years active: 1981–present
- Spouse: Janno Gibbs (m. 1991)
- Children: 2
- Parents: Carlos “Caloy” Loyzaga (father); Vicky Cuerva Loyzaga (mother)
- Relatives: Teresa Loyzaga (sister); Princess Loyzaga (sister); Melissa Gibbs (sister-in-law); Ronaldo Valdez† (father-in-law); Maria Fe Ylagan-Gibbs (mother-in-law); Chito Loyzaga (brother); Joey Loyzaga (brother); Diego Loyzaga (nephew)

Carla Victoria "Bing" Cuerva Loyzaga-Gibbs (born April 9, 1970) is a Filipino actress and singer. She is known for her villainous roles in several shows Babaeng Hampaslupa as Katharina, Sinasamba Kita as Isabellita and Kay Tagal Kang Hinintay as Brigita. In 2020, Loyzaga portrayed the role of Donya Elvira Dominante Cruz in the drama, Paano ang Pangako?. She also played a supporting role in Stories from the Heart: Loving Miss Bridgette as Dra. Stella Morales Villareal. Kapag Nahati Ang Puso as Miranda Aseron in 2018.

== Biography ==
Carla Victoria "Bing" Cuerva Loyzaga-Gibbs is a Filipina singer and actress. She is the daughter of Carlos Loyzaga, considered to be one of the greatest Filipino basketball player of all time. She has four siblings, namely, Chito Loyzaga, Joey Loyzaga, Princess Loyzaga, and Theresa Loyzaga.

Loyzaga married singer and actor Janno Gibbs on January 6, 1991. They have two daughters, Alyssa and Gabriela.

== Career ==
Her career started when she was discovered in a toothpaste commercial where she sang the background song entitled "I Smile for You."

Among her TV appearances were Tonyong Bayawak, Agua Bendita, Paano Ba ang Mangarap?, My Girl, Marimar, Kung Mamahalin Mo Lang Ako, Leya, ang Pinakamagandang Babae sa Ilalim ng Lupa, Saang Sulok ng Langit, and Kay Tagal Kang Hinintay. Loyzaga is one of the co-hosts in Sa Linggo nAPO Sila from 1990 until 1995 and 'Sang Linggo nAPO Sila from 1995-1998.

She is well-known for being villainous on many TV series and films.

In 2017, Loyzaga starred for her role as Maila, Bianca's mother in Ikaw Lang ang Iibigin on ABS-CBN then she went back to her home network, GMA in 2018 and starred in the Afternoon Prime series, Kapag Nahati ang Puso as Miranda Aseron an evil stepmother of Claire and the wife of Nico.

== Filmography ==
=== Film ===
Year	Title	Role(s)
1986	Captain Barbell	Bing
1987	Puto	Tere
1988	Pik Pak Boom	Dolly
1990	Kahit Konting Pagtingin	Cynthia
1994	Forever	Beth
1996	Hindi Ako Ander! (Itanong Mo Kay Kumander)	Cindy
2004	Enteng Kabisote: OK Ka Fairy Ko... The Legend	Satana
2005	Enteng Kabisote 2: Okay Ka Fairy Ko... The Legend Continues!	Satana
2005	Kutob	Rowena
2006	TxT	Edith
2006	Enteng Kabisote 3: Okay Ka, Fairy Ko: The Legend Goes On and On and On	Satana
2010	Rosario	The Tenant
2010	Si Agimat at si Enteng Kabisote	Satana
2011	Enteng ng Ina Mo	Satana
2012	Si Agimat, si Enteng Kabisote at si Ako	Satana
2013	Bahay ng Lagim	Sophia
2014	Dementia	Ellaine
2018	Recipe For Love	Editha Lizares
2019	Second Coming	Edralline
2021	Mang Jose	Tina

=== Television ===
Year	Title	Role
1981–84	GMA Supershow	Herself / co-host
1989–90	That's Entertainment	Herself / Tuesday Group Member
1990–95	Sa Linggo nAPO Sila	Herself / Host
1995–98	'Sang Linggo nAPO Sila	Herself / Host
1995	Home Along Da Riles	Kevin's niece
1998–99	Brunch	Herself / co-host with Michelle van Eimeren
2000	GMA Mini Series: Munting Anghel	Miss. Elvira
2002–03	Kay Tagal Kang Hinintay	Brigitta Arcangel
2004–05	Leya, ang Pinakamagandang Babae sa Ilalim ng Lupa	Rosario
2005	Saang Sulok ng Langit	Odette
2005–06	Kung Mamahalin Mo Lang Ako	Mayor Amanda Lariza
2006	Pinakamamahal	Sister Salve Querubin
2007	Sine Novela: Sinasamba Kita	Isabellita
2007–08	Marimar	Esperanza Aldama
2008	My Girl	Bel Abueva
2009	Sine Novela: Paano Ba Ang Mangarap?	Doña Francia Balmores-Valderama
2009	Your Song: Sa Kanya Pa Rin	Marta
2010	Rubi	Carla Cardenas
2010	Agua Bendita	Solita Aguirre
2010	Agimat: Ang Mga Alamat ni Ramon Revilla: Tonyong Bayawak	Mrs Inocencio
2010	Your Song: Andi	Minerva Mariveles
2010	Wansapanataym: Kakambal Ko'y Manyika	Beth Gatchalian
2011	Babaeng Hampaslupa	Katarina Wong / Katarina Manansala
2012	Felina: Prinsesa ng mga Pusa	Greta
2012	Sharon: Kasama Mo, Kapatid	Herself
2012–13	Enchanted Garden	Emillia / Queen Helfora
2013–14	Positive	Esther Santillan
2015	Wansapanataym: Yamishita's Treasures	Helena
2016	Magandang Buhay	Herself / Guest
2017	Ipaglaban Mo!: Mental	Dra. Ella Monsales
2017	Ikaw Lang ang Iibigin	Maila Salcedo-Agbayani †
2017	Ipaglaban Mo!: Groufie	Patricia
2018	Kapag Nahati ang Puso	Miranda Aseron / Miranda Del Valle
2019	Tadhana: Insan	Mel
2019	Magpakailanman: Ang Pagmulat ng Binulag na Kasambahay (The Bonita Baran Story)	Lea
2019–20	Beautiful Justice	Charmaine "Ninang" Tan / Chantelle Cuevas
2020	Paano ang Pasko?	Doña Elvira Dominante-Cruz †
2021	Paano ang Pangako?	Doña Elvira Dominante-Cruz †
2021	Stories from the Heart: Loving Miss Bridgette	Dra. Stella Morales-Villareal
