= Power of 10 (Philippine game show) =

2009 Philippine television game show

- Title card
- Genre: Game show
- Based on: Power of 10 by Michael Davies
- Presented by: Janno Gibbs
- Country of origin: Philippines
- Original language: Tagalog
- No. of episodes: 34

Production
- Production locations: Quezon City, Philippines
- Camera setup: Multiple-camera setup
- Production company: GMA Entertainment TV

Original release
- Network: GMA Network
- Release: May 10 – December 27, 2009

Power of 10 is a 2009 Philippine television game show broadcast by GMA Network. Hosted by Janno Gibbs, it premiered on May 10, 2009 on the network's Sunday primetime line up. The show concluded on December 27, 2009, with a total of 34 episodes.

== Host ==
- Janno Gibbs

== Ratings ==
According to AGB Nielsen Philippines' Mega Manila household television ratings, the pilot episode of Power of 10 earned a 24% rating.
