= Seven (Janno Gibbs album) =

Studio album by Janno Gibbs
- Released: September 2004
- Recorded: 2004
- Genres: R&B, Soul
- Languages: English, Tagalog
- Label: GMA Records
- Producers: Felipe S. Yalung (EVP and COO); Buddy Medina (Executive Producer); Rene A. Salta (Managing Director)

Janno Gibbs chronology
| Divas & Me (2001) | Seven (2004) | Seven (Special Edition) (2007) |

Singles from Seven
- 1. "Fallin'" Released: 2004; 2. "Pinakamagandang Lalaki" Released: 2005; 3. "Heart of Mine" Released: 2005; 4. "Kung Mamahalin Mo Lang Ako" Released: 2005; 5. "Sana Dalawa ang Puso Ko" Released: 2005

Seven is the seventh album of singer/actor/host Janno Gibbs. It was produced and released by GMA Records in September 2004.

== Track listing ==
| No. | Title | Writer(s) | Length |
|---|---|---|---|
| 1. | "Pinakamagandang Lalaki" | Janno Gibbs | 4:20 |
| 2. | "Fallin'" | Janno Gibbs | 4:15 |
| 3. | "Kasinungalingan" | Freddie Saturno | 4:50 |
| 4. | "Heart of Mine" | Boz Scaggs | 4:25 |
| 5. | "I Will Be" | Janno Gibbs, Ogie Alcasid | 5:00 |
| 6. | "Sana Dalawa Ang Puso Ko" | Bodjie Dasig | 4:50 |
| 7. | "Soon" | Wency Cornejo | 4:20 |
| 8. | "Di Ko Man Lang Alam" | Jojo Alejar | 4:31 |
| 9. | "Umibig Muli" | Janno Gibbs | 4:46 |
| 10. | "Kung Mamahalin Mo Lang Ako" | Janno Gibbs | 4:25 |
| 11. | "I'll Never Ever Say Goodbye" | Willy Cruz | 4:35 |

Note: Seven also has a Special Edition album. This includes the following tracks:

| No. | Title | Writer(s) | Length |
|---|---|---|---|
| 1. | "Sumisigaw" | Janno Gibbs | 4:20 |
| 2. | "Fallin' (Alternate Mix)" | Janno Gibbs | 4:15 |
| 3. | "Fallin' (Minus One)" | Janno Gibbs | 4:15 |
