= The Doll (band) =

English punk rock/new wave band

- Origin: London, England
- Genres: Punk rock, new wave
- Years active: 1977–1980
- Label: Beggars Banquet
- Past members: Marion Valentine; Adonis Yanni; Christos Yianni; Mario Watts; Denis Haines; Jamie West-Oram; Paul Turner

The Doll were a punk rock/new wave band from London, England, who had a top-thirty hit in 1979 with "Desire Me".

== History ==
The Doll formed in October 1977 with a line-up of Marion Valentine (Marion Sauva/Marion Valentino)(vocals, guitar), Adonis Yianni (keyboards), Christos Yianni (bass guitar), and Mario Watts (drums). They were signed by Beggars Banquet Records, who included their track "Trash" on the Streets compilation and issued their debut single, "Don't Tango on my Heart", in January 1978. They hit the UK Singles Chart with their second single, "Desire Me", which spent eight weeks on the chart, peaking at number 28 in January 1979, and led to the band appearing on Top of the Pops. Female singer Valentine became the unintended focus of attention from the press as a result, making her a 'punk sex symbol'.

Valentine and Christos Yianni recruited a new line-up including Denis Haines (keyboards), Jamie West-Oram (lead guitar), and Paul Turner (drums). The new line-up recorded an album titled Listen to the Silence, and a handful of other singles, but failed to repeat their earlier success and split up in spring 1980.

=== After the split ===
Jamie West-Oram later enjoyed success with new wave band the Fixx.

Denis Haines subsequently played keyboards with fellow Beggars Banquet Records artist Gary Numan. With other members of Numan's backing band he later formed Dramatis.

Christos Yanni (bass/vocals) joined the Shoppers, a post-punk band in the London scene with Steve Brain (guitar/lead vocals), Maxine Tarte (keyboards/vocals) and Gavin Hearne (lead guitar/vocals).

== Discography ==
=== Albums ===
- Listen to the Silence (1979), Beggars Banquet

=== Singles ===
- "Don't Tango on My Heart"/"Trash" (1978), Beggars Banquet – personnel listed as Baby Doll (guitar & vocals), Adonis (keyboards), Whizz Kid (bass) and Mario Watts (drums)
- "Desire Me"/"T.V.Addict"/"Burning Up Like a Fire"/"Desire Me (Extended Version)" (1978), Beggars Banquet – UK No. 28
- "Cinderella with a Husky Voice"/"Because Now" (1979), Beggars Banquet
- "You Used to Be My Hero"/"Because Now" (1980), Beggars Banquet
- "Burning Up Like a Fire"/"Frozen Fire" (1980), Beggars Banquet
