= Doll, Highland =

Coordinates: 58.001783°N 3.882387°W

Doll: Scottish Gaelic: An Dail
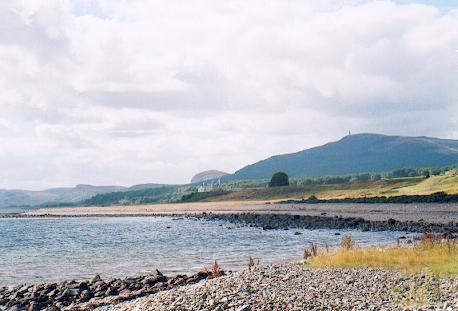
- Looking south from Brora towards Doll.

- Location within the Sutherland area
- OS grid reference: NC888029
- Council area: Highland
- Country: Scotland
- Sovereign state: United Kingdom
- Post town: Brora
- Postcode district: KW9 6
- Police: Scotland
- Fire: Scottish
- Ambulance: Scottish

Doll is a scattered mixed crofting township and rural village 2 miles (3 km) southwest of Brora, on the A9 coast road, on the east coast of Sutherland, Scottish Highlands and is in the Scottish council area of Highland. The main road artery of the A9 has bypassed Doll to the south.

== Etymology ==
The name Doll may be of Brittonic origin and derived from dol meaning "haugh, meadow" (cf. Welsh dôl; compare Dull).

== Settlements ==
Doll, in the Parish of Clyne, is a scattered crofting township, located south of the Brora River with Brora located at the other side river to the northeast. Doll consists of a large flat plain, in a triangular shape, with the longest edge following the course of the river. To the southwest lies the village of Golspie. John Bartholomew described the hamlet as:

Doll, hamlet with school, Clyne par., SE. Sutherlandshire, 2 miles W. of Brora.
