= Lupin (Philippine TV series) =

2007 Philippine television drama series

- Title card
- Genre: Action drama
- Based on: Arsène Lupin by Maurice Leblanc
- Developed by: Suzette Doctolero
- Written by: Jules Katanyag; Zita Garganera; Tina Samson; Kit Villanueva-Langit
- Directed by: Mike Tuviera; Lore Reyes
- Starring: Richard Gutierrez
- Theme music composer: Janno Gibbs
- Opening theme: "Lupin" by Janno Gibbs and Ara Mina
- Country of origin: Philippines
- Original language: Tagalog
- No. of episodes: 95 episodes + 1 special

Production
- Executive producer: Helen Rose Sese
- Camera setup: Multiple-camera setup
- Running time: 22–44 minutes
- Production company: GMA Entertainment TV

Original release
- Network: GMA Network
- Release: April 9 – August 17, 2007

Lupin is a 2007 Philippine television drama action series broadcast by GMA Network. The series is loosely based on a series of French fictional crime novels featuring the Arsène Lupin by Maurice Leblanc. Directed by Mike Tuviera and Lore Reyes, it stars Richard Gutierrez in the title role. It premiered on April 9, 2007, on the network's Telebabad line up. The series concluded on August 17, 2007, with a total of 95 episodes.

The series is streaming online on YouTube.

== Overview ==
Created by Maurice Leblanc, Arsène Lupin first appeared in a series of short stories serialized in 1905 and published in book form as Arsène Lupin, gentleman-cambrioleur in 1907 (translated into English as The Extraordinary Adventures of Arsene Lupin, Gentleman-Burglar).

Born in the late 19th century, Lupin is a gentleman thief, a master of disguise, and an amateur detective. While operating on the wrong side of the law, he is still a force for good. Those who Lupin defeats are worse villains than he. Other characters in the stories include Lupin's faithful accomplice Grognard and his lawman adversary Inspector Justin Ganimard. In some stories Lupin faces Arthur Conan Doyle's Sherlock Holmes (called "Herlock Sholmès" for copyright reasons).

The Lupin stories have been adapted for television (including animation), cinema, and comics.

== Cast and characters ==
Cast

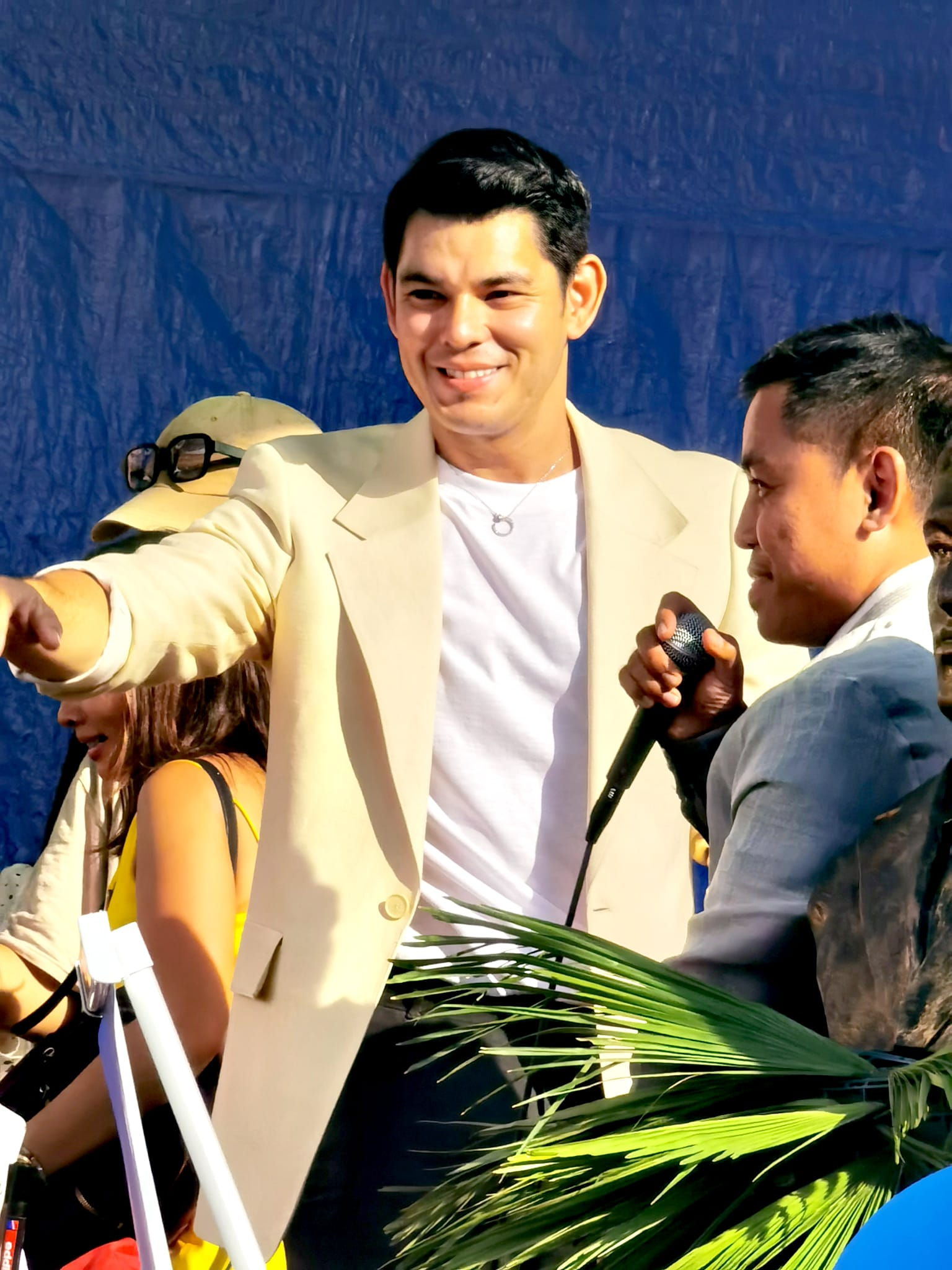
Richard Gutierrez

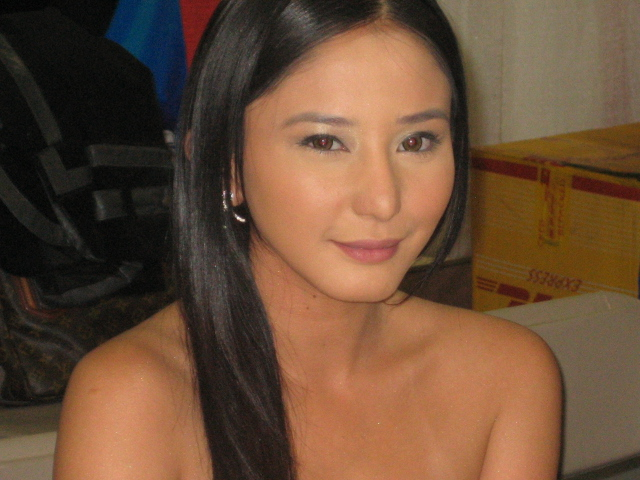
Katrina Halili

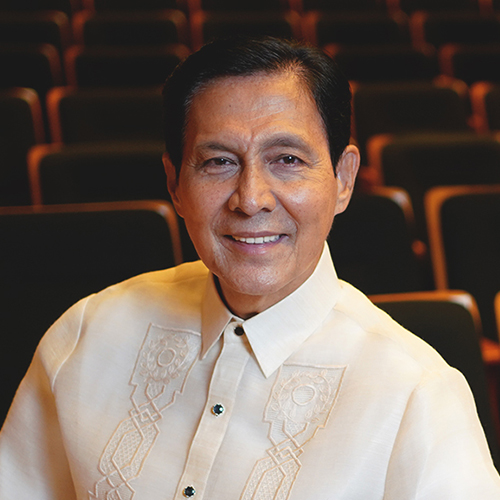
Tirso Cruz III

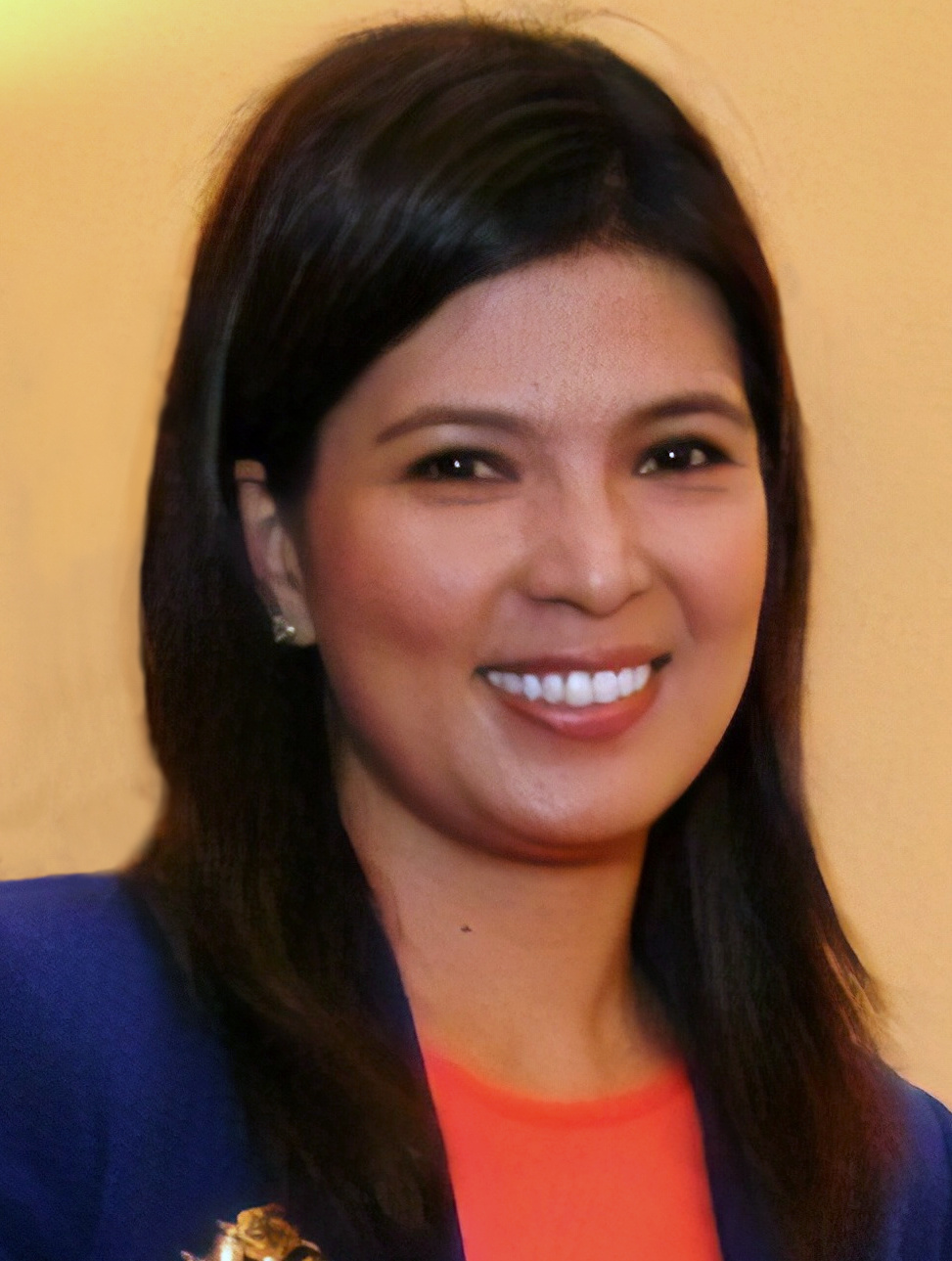
Lani Mercado

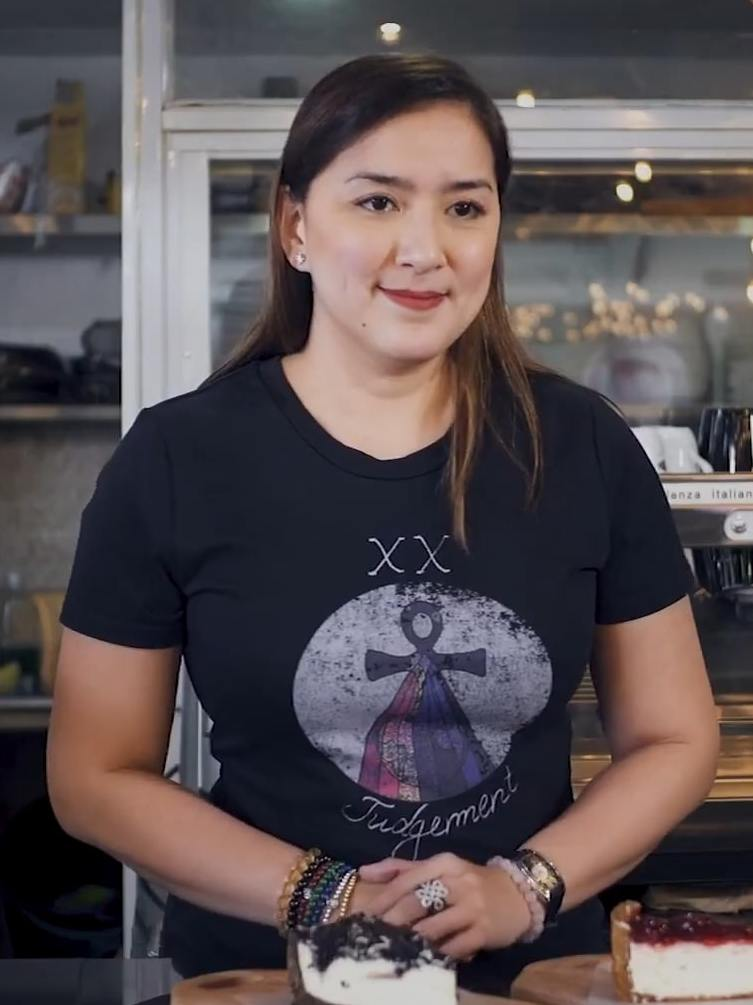
Ara Mina

Lead cast

- Richard Gutierrez as André Lupin / Lupin De Dios / Xedric Apacer

Supporting cast

- Ehra Madrigal as Brigitte Maisog
- Boy2 Quizon as Castor
- Katrina Halili as Veronica Arkanghel / Ashley Calibre
- Rhian Ramos as Avril Legarda
- Janno Gibbs as Clavio Angeles
- Tirso Cruz III as Fundador "Duroy" De Dios
- Ricky Davao as Moon Raven
- Lani Mercado as Cecilia Lupin
- Ara Mina as Anna Nicole
- Polo Ravales as Josh Apacer
- Bearwin Meily as Danggoy
- Alicia Alonzo as Nelia
- Ramon Christopher Gutierrez as Perez
- Almira Muhlach as Victoria Apacer
- LJ Reyes as Elaine
- Sandy Talag as Angela
- Abby Cruz as Angeli Villavicer
- John Apacible as Maskardo
- Gerard Pizzaras as Ernie
- Tyron Perez as Agent X-J
- Rea Nakpil as Trixie
- Melissa Mendez as Edith Legarda
- Debraliz as Guring

Guest cast

- Michael de Mesa as Minggoy Buang / Miguel Apacer
- Elvis Gutierrez as Sundance Raven
- Alyssa Alano as Marry
- Dick Israel as Jouquin Bagbag
- Benjie Paras as Generoso / Jenny
- Andrew Wolfe as Adonis Angeles
- Dante Rivero
- Bing Davao
- Patricia Ysmael as Christa
- Neil Ryan Sese as Lopez
- Sheree as Virgin
- January Isaac as Jorja
- Tuesday Vargas as Magdalene
- Roy Alvarez as Ybrahim Santiago
- Nonie Buencamino as Arsenio Lupin
- Joyce Jimenez as Courtney Amor
- Giselle Sanchez as Sanaita
- Rez Cortez as Milyones
- Kier Legaspi as Katas
- Paul Alvarez as Uno
- Mang Enriquez as Enriquez
- Gary Estrada as Rosas
- Joyce Ching as younger Brigitte
- Mon Confiado
