= Doll (band) =

Canadian rock band

Doll is a Canadian punk rock/new grunge band from Ottawa, Ontario. They have opened for Three Days Grace and many other well-known bands.

== History ==
The band started in early 2007, when Christina Kasper and Pete Kasper were looking for a drummer and met Nick Richer at an Evanescence concert. The band was rounded out with the addition of Véronique Paquette on bass. The band was named Doll to reflect its female lead singer.

Paquette later left the band, to be replaced by Julie-Anne Madore. Christina and Madore grew up together in Edmunston, New Brunswick and had played in another band together.

In 2009, Doll released their first album, Inside The Dollhouse. A video was also filmed for "Daddy's Little Girl", their first single which played on MuchMusic and MusiquePlus. A second video was created for their second single, "Sally Lost Her Shoelaces". Madore left the band a few years after and Paquette returned in her place.

In 2011, they released their second album, The Ragdoll Diaries. Two singles/videos came out of this: "FMO" and "Youth of Today, Hope for Tomorrow". This album was not only released in CD format, but vinyl. Soon after, Alex Vance was recruited to fill the bass position.

Doll has acted as the opening band for Lacuna Coil, Danko Jones, Spinnerette, Protest the Hero, Band of Skulls, Anvil, Halestorm, SNFU, Hanzel Und Gretyl, Civet, The Creepshow and Die Mannequin.

In 2013, the band released a video for their single "Plastic Lies". and continued to perform in Toronto.

== Band members ==
=== Current ===
- Christina Kasper - vocals, guitar (2007–present)
- Pete Kasper - guitar (2007–present)
- Nick Richer - drums, backing vocals (2007–present)
- Alex Vance - bass, backing vocals (2011–present)

=== Former ===
- Véronique Paquette - bass, backing vocals (2007–2008, 2011)
- Julie-Anne Madore - bass, backing vocals (2008–2011)

== Discography ==
- Inside the Dollhouse (2009)
- The Ragdoll Diaries (2011)
