= Miracle in Cell No. 7 =

2013 South Korean comedy film

- Theatrical release poster
- Hangul: 7번방의 선물
- Hanja: 7番房의 膳物
- Lit.: A Gift from Room 7
- RR: 7beonbangui seonmul
- MR: 7pŏnbangŭi sŏnmul
- Directed by: Lee Hwan-kyung
- Written by: Lee Hwan-kyung; Yu Young-a; Kim Hwang-sung; Kim Young-seok
- Produced by: Kim Min-ki; Lee Sang-hun
- Starring: Ryu Seung-ryong; Park Shin-hye; Kal So-won; Jung Jin-young; Oh Dal-su; Park Won-sang; Kim Jung-tae; Jung Man-sik
- Cinematography: Kang Seung-gi
- Edited by: Choi Jae-geun; Kim So-yeon
- Music by: Lee Dong-jun
- Production company: Fineworks/CL Entertainment
- Distributed by: Next Entertainment World
- Release date: January 23, 2013
- Running time: 127 minutes
- Country: South Korea
- Language: Korean
- Box office: $82.1 million

Miracle in Cell No. 7 (Korean: 7번방의 선물) is a 2013 South Korean comedy drama film starring Ryu Seung-ryong, Kal So-won and Park Shin-hye. The film is about a developmentally disabled man wrongfully imprisoned for murder, who builds friendships with the hardened criminals in his cell, who in return help him see his daughter again by smuggling her into the prison.

The movie is based on the real-life story of a man who was tortured and pleaded guilty under duress to the rape and murder of a 9-year-old girl on September 27, 1972 in Chuncheon before being finally exonerated in November 2008. Its early working title was December 23 (12월 23일).

== Plot ==
Ye-sung is training to be a lawyer, and chooses her late father's wrongful conviction for a crime he did not commit as the subject for her mock trial. While leaving the prison court after a successful verdict, Ye-sung notices a balloon caught on barbed wire and reminisces.

Back in 1997, 6-year-old Ye-sung and her father, Yong-gu (who has a developmental disability), stare into a store window admiring a Sailor Moon backpack. Yong-gu promises to buy Ye-sung the backpack when he gets paid. However, the police commissioner and his daughter purchased it before Yong-gu. When Yong-gu rushes in to grab the backpack, he is assaulted by the police commissioner and kicked out of the store. After the incident, the two return home without the bag, slightly battered, but in high spirits. The next day, after work, the commissioner's daughter spots Yong-gu and tries to show him another store selling the same backpack. In an unfortunate accident, the little girl slips running on the market's icy pavement and a brick drops on her head, killing her. Yong-gu is arrested for rape and murder after his futile attempts at CPR are misconstrued by a female bystander.

Yong-gu is sent to prison, where he shares a jail cell (titled "Room 7") with five other inmates, all of who initially dislike him for his falsely accused crime and his disability. One day, Yong-gu saves the life of his cellmate and prison gang leader, So Yang-ho, from being stabbed by a rival prison gang leader. Touched at this, Yang-ho then offers to help Yong-gu in any way he can to return the favor. Yong-gu tells Yang-ho that he wants to see his daughter Ye-sung. The inmates successfully smuggle Ye-sung into the prison when her choir visits the prison for a performance. Ye-sung is introduced to her dad's cellmates and manages to stay for a night, but is inadvertently found by the warden. Eventually, the warden realises that Yong-gu is not the assailant of the girl after Yong-gu saves him from an attempted arson, and allows Ye-sung to visit Yong-gu every day after school.

Before the trial takes place, Yong-gu is trained by the Room 7 inmates on how to answer potential prosecution questions and he becomes proficient in answering them. Unfortunately, the commissioner beats Yong-gu before the trial in a fit of rage, threatening to kill his daughter if he does not confess. Left with no other choice, Yong-gu sacrifices himself by lying that he killed the commissioner's daughter to protect Ye-sung. Yong-gu is then sentenced to death and the execution date is scheduled for December 23, which happens to fall on Ye-sung's birthday. Feeling sorry for Yong-gu, the inmates decide to build a hot air balloon for Yong-gu to escape. During a prison concert, the inmates send Yong-gu and Ye-sung on the balloon while the guards pretend to be overwhelmed, but the balloon's rope is caught by barbed wire. On the day of Yong-gu's execution, the inmates and Yong-gu celebrate Ye-sung's birthday before he is executed.

In a training court 16 years later (in the present), Ye-sung, the prison warden and the Room 7 inmates all attend Yong-gu's mock trial to prove his innocence. The judge overturns the previous verdict and grants him a posthumous acquittal, as well as a court order to re-investigate the girl's death. Though it carries no legal weight or consequences, it provides closure to the joyful Room 7 inmates, the silent warden, and tearful Ye-sung. The scene then returns to the beginning of the film, where Ye-sung has a vision of Yong-gu and her younger self on the hot air balloon waving goodbye. She tearfully says goodbye to her father as the balloon flies away.

== Cast ==
- Ryu Seung-ryong as Lee Yong-gu
- Kal So-won as Lee Ye-sung
  - Park Shin-hye as adult Lee Ye-sung
- Jung Jin-young as Jang Min-hwan (special appearance)
- Oh Dal-su as So Yang-ho
- Park Won-sang as Choi Chun-ho
- Kim Jung-tae as Kang Man-beom
- Jung Man-sik as Shin Bong-shik
- Kim Ki-cheon as Old man Da-do
- Kang Ye-seo as Choi Ji-yeon

== Box office ==
The film took 4.6 million admissions (the equivalent of more than US$30 million) in its first two weeks due to strong word of mouth. Despite the release of The Berlin File, it drew in 15% more audience members on its third week, with seat booking at 75.8%. 32 days after its release, it became only the eighth film in Korean cinema history to break the 10 million mark in ticket sales. This was especially notable since Miracle in Cell No. 7 had a modest budget with a break-even point of 1.7 million admissions, making its eventual profit the highest among the films that reached 10 million.

The film exceeded 12 million viewers 46 days after its release. On March 15, 2013, 52 days after its release, ticket sales reached 12.32 million, making it the seventh highest grossing Korean film of all time.

Analysts say among the reasons for its success was the long lunar new year holiday and families going to see the film in groups. The film proved to be especially popular among middle-aged and elderly Koreans.

== Awards and nominations ==
Award	Category	Recipient(s)	Outcome
49th Baeksang Arts Awards	Best Film	Miracle in Cell No. 7	Nominated
49th Baeksang Arts Awards	Best Actor	Ryu Seung-ryong	Nominated
49th Baeksang Arts Awards	Best Supporting Actor	Oh Dal-su	Nominated
49th Baeksang Arts Awards	Best Supporting Actress	Park Shin-hye	Nominated
49th Baeksang Arts Awards	Best New Actress	Kal So-won	Nominated
49th Baeksang Arts Awards	Best Screenplay	Lee Hwan-kyung, Kim Hwang-sung, Kim Young-seok	Nominated
49th Baeksang Arts Awards	Grand Prize for Film	Ryu Seung-ryong	Won
49th Baeksang Arts Awards	Most Popular Actress	Park Shin-hye	Won
7th Mnet 20's Choice Awards	20's Movie Star, Male	Ryu Seung-ryong	Won
7th Mnet 20's Choice Awards	20's Movie Star, Female	Park Shin-hye	Nominated
22nd Buil Film Awards	Best New Actress	Kal So-won	Nominated
50th Grand Bell Awards	Best Actor	Ryu Seung-ryong	Won
50th Grand Bell Awards	Best Screenplay	Lee Hwan-kyung	Won
50th Grand Bell Awards	Best Planning	Lee Hwan-kyung, Kim Min-ki, Kim Min-guk	Won
50th Grand Bell Awards	Special Jury Prize	Kal So-won	Won
50th Grand Bell Awards	Best Director	Lee Hwan-kyung	Nominated
50th Grand Bell Awards	Best Actress	Kal So-won	Nominated
50th Grand Bell Awards	Best Supporting Actor	Oh Dal-su	Nominated
50th Grand Bell Awards	Best New Actress	Kal So-won	Nominated
50th Grand Bell Awards	Best Cinematography	Kang Seung-gi	Nominated
50th Grand Bell Awards	Best Editing	Choi Jae-geun, Kim So-yeon	Nominated
50th Grand Bell Awards	Best Art Direction	Lee Hoo-gyoung	Nominated
50th Grand Bell Awards	Best Lighting	Kang Sung-hoon	Nominated
50th Grand Bell Awards	Best Costume Design	Kim Na-yeon	Nominated
50th Grand Bell Awards	Best Music	Lee Dong-jun	Nominated
34th Blue Dragon Film Awards	Most Popular Film	Miracle in Cell No. 7	Won
34th Blue Dragon Film Awards	Best Actor	Ryu Seung-ryong	Nominated
34th Blue Dragon Film Awards	Best Screenplay	Lee Hwan-kyung	Nominated
34th Blue Dragon Film Awards	Best Music	Lee Dong-jun	Nominated
21st Korean Culture and Entertainment Awards	Grand Prize in Film	Ryu Seung-ryong	Won
21st Korean Culture and Entertainment Awards	Top Excellence Award, Actor in Film	Oh Dal-su	Won
2014 34th Golden Cinema Festival	Best Supporting Actor	Oh Dal-su	Won
33rd Korean Association of Film Critics Awards	Best Supporting Actress	Park Shin-hye	Won

== Remakes ==
The film was adapted into a Kannada movie in 2017 titled Pushpaka Vimana. Kross Pictures were supposed to produce the official Hindi remake of the movie in collaboration which was supposed to be directed by Umesh Shukla but eventually was not made.

It was also adapted in 2019 in Turkey as 7. Koğuştaki Mucize starring Aras Bulut İynemli in the lead role. This is an entirely dramatic interpretation and adds several story elements and characters. The film was also adapted in the Philippines with the same title, starring Aga Muhlach, Bela Padilla and Xia Vigor. Indonesia adapted the film with the same title in 2022, and spawned to a sequel in 2024 titled 2nd Miracle in Cell No. 7, while remakes are being planned in Spain, and the United States. In 2025, a Mexican remake titled La Celda de los Milagros was released starring Omar Chaparro.

Year	Film	Country	Director
2017	Pushpaka Vimana	India	S. Ravindranath
2019	Miracle in Cell No. 7	Turkey	Mehmet Ada Öztekin
2019	Miracle in Cell No.7	Philippines	Nuel Crisostomo Naval
2022	Miracle in Cell No.7	Indonesia	Hanung Bramantyo
2025	La Celda de los Milagros	Mexico	Ana Lorena Pérez Ríos

== See also ==
- Joe Arridy, an American mentally disabled man who was executed after being falsely convicted of rape
