= Herwin Novianto =

Indonesian film director (born 1965)

- Born: November 21, 1965 (age 59); Jakarta, Indonesia
- Occupation: Film Director
- Awards: Citra Award for Best Director; 2012 Indonesian Film Festival Tanah Surga... Katanya

Herwin Novianto is an Indonesian film director who won the Citra Award for Best Director at the 2012 Indonesian Film Festival for his drama Tanah Surga... Katanya (Land of Heaven... They Say). He later directed Aisyah, biarkan kami bersaudara in 2016 which starred Laudya Cynthia Bella.

== Biography ==
Novianto made his feature film debut in 2009 with Jagad X Code, for which he also wrote the story. Jagad X Code was set in a village alongside Code Stream in Yogyakarta, which had received support from Y. B. Mangunwijaya but was forced to be self-sufficient after Mangunwijaya's death. It followed three youths from the village who, unable to buy the things they want owing to omnipresent poverty, agree to find a flash drive for a local thug.

In 2011 Novianto's television film Papi, Mami, dan Tukang Kebun (Father, Mother, and the Gardener) won twelve prizes at the FTV Awards in Jakarta, including Best Director.

Novianto's second feature film, Tanah Surga... Katanya, was released in 2012. He won the Citra Award for Best Director for the film, being selected over more established directors such as Hanung Bramantyo and Teddy Soeriaatmadja; the film itself was selected as Best Film. Novianto described it as a surprise, but suggested he was burdened by the prize because he would be pressured to produce better work the following year.

At another ceremony in Jakarta, Novianto received a Vidia Award for Best Director for Pahala Terindah (The Most Beautiful Reward), one of eight awards received by the television film. It followed a polygamous marriage in the Dieng Plateau of Central Java and starred Slamet Rahardjo and Ratna Riantiarno.

== Filmography ==
| Year | Title | Credit | | Production House |
| Year | Title | Director | Screenwriter | Production House |
|---|---|---|---|---|
| 2009 | Jagad X Code | Yes | Yes | Maleo Pictures |
| 2012 | Tanah Surga... Katanya | Yes | No | Demi Gisela Citra Sinema |
| 2016 | Aisyah: Biarkan Kami Bersaudara | Yes | No | Film One Production |
| 2018 | Gila Lu Ndro! | Yes | No | Falcon Pictures |
| 2019 | Sin | Yes | No | Falcon Pictures |
| 2020 | Sejuta Sayang Untuknya | Yes | No | MD Pictures; Demi Gisela Citra Sinema |
| 2021 | Yang Tak Tergantikan | Yes | Yes | Falcon Pictures |
| 2021 | Agen Dunia | Yes | Yes | Falcon Pictures |
| 2021 | Kapan Pindah Rumah | Yes | No | KlikFilm Productions |
| 2021 | Eyang Ti | Yes | Yes | KlikFilm Productions |
| TBA | Kata | Yes | No | Falcon Pictures |
| TBA | Invalidite | Yes | No | Falcon Pictures |

== Works cited ==
- "Filmografi Herwin Novianto" [Filmography of Herwin Novianto]. filmindonesia.or.id (in Indonesian). Jakarta: Konfiden Foundation. Archived from the original on 5 March 2016.
- "Ini Nominasi FFI 2012" [These are the Nominations for the 2012 IFF]. Republik (in Indonesian). Jakarta. 27 November 2012. Archived from the original on 6 January 2013.
- "JagadXCode Filmnya Orang Jogja" [JagadXCode Film for Yogyakartans]. Kompas (in Indonesian). Jakarta. 4 February 2009. Archived from the original on 3 January 2011.
- "Kehidupan Pinggir Kali Code Difilmkan" [Life at the Banks of Code Stream Filmed]. Kompas (in Indonesian). Jakarta. 12 July 2008. Archived from the original on 4 March 2016.
- Mahditama, Iman (1 December 2012). "An old-timers' fiesta at the Vidia Awards". The Jakarta Post. p. 22. Archived from the original on 5 March 2016.
- "'Papi, Mami, dan Tukang Kebun' Berjaya di FTV Awards" ['Papi, Mami, dan Tukang Kebun' Dominates the FTV Awards]. Suara Merdeka (in Indonesian). Semarang. 16 July 2011. Archived from the original on 6 April 2013.
- "Penghargaan Tanah Surga... Katanya" [Awards for Tanah Surga... Katanya]. filmindonesia.or.id (in Indonesian). Jakarta: Konfiden Foundation. Archived from the original on 2 January 2014.
- Wicaksono, Pribadi (9 December 2012). "Sutradara Terbaik FFI Jadi Beban Herwin Novianto" [Best Director at IFF is a Burden for Herwin Novianto]. Tempo (in Indonesian). Jakarta. Archived from the original on 28 June 2013.
