= Xia Vigor =

Filipino-British actress and TV host

- Born: Xiamara Sophia Bernardo Vigor; June 23, 2009 (age 17); Belfast, Northern Ireland
- Occupations: Actress; television personality
- Years active: 2015–present
- Agents: Star Magic (2015–2019); Viva Artists Agency (2019–present)
- Notable work: It's Showtime Mini Me 2 (Grand Winner); Princess Chavez in Langit Lupa

Xiamahra “Xia” Elyzabietth Sophia Bernardo Vigor (born 23 June 2009) is a British-Filipino actress.

== Biography ==
She was the first grand winner of It's Showtime's segment "Mini Me 2" as mini Selena Gomez. She was the main co-host of It's Showtime's segment "Xia and Kuys" with co-hosts Vhong Navarro and Billy Crawford. She rose to fame after joining the first season of Your Face Sounds Familiar: Kids when she impersonated American singer-songwriter Taylor Swift, though her performance attracted controversy in the United Kingdom when host Piers Morgan criticised Vigor's performance for being sexualised, allegations of which Vigor's father denied. Vigor was also given an offer to portray American child actress Shirley Temple.

== Filmography ==
=== Film ===
Year	Title	Role
2017	Mang Kepweng Returns	Menggay
2018	My Perfect You	Tetet
2019	Alone/Together	Aisha Fausto
2019	Familia Blondina	Jill
2019	Unbreakable	Mareena
2019	Miracle in Cell No. 7	Yesha Gopez (child)
2022	The Wedding Dress	Clara
2024	Itutumba Ka ng Tatay Ko	Tin Tin
2024	Sunny	Bea
2024	Nanay Tatay	
2026	2nd Miracle in Cell No. 7	Yesha Gopez

=== Television ===
Year	Title	Role
2015	FlordeLiza	young Anna
2015	It's Showtime	Herself/Mini Me S2 Grand Winner/Co-host
2015–2016	Ang Probinsyano	Keana Burton
2016	Wansapanataym	Xia (cameo role)
2016–2017	Langit Lupa	Princess Chavez
2017	Little Big Shots	Guest Contestant
2017	Gandang Gabi, Vice	Guest with YFSF Kids
2017	Your Face Sounds Familiar: Kids	Herself/Contestant
2017	Maalala Mo Kaya: Upuan	Rosa Mae
2018	Maalala Mo Kaya: Laptop	Young Caitlin
2018	The Kids' Choice	Herself
2019	Maalala Mo Kaya: Mansanas	Audrey
2019–2020	Team Yey!	Host
2019	Ipaglaban Mo: Labandera	Princess
2019	Maalaala Mo Kaya: Wheelchair	Sam
2025–2026	Para sa Isa't Isa	Charlie Magtibay

== Awards and nominations ==
Year	Award ceremony	Category	Nominee(s)/work(s)	Result	Ref
2017	48th GMMSF Box-Office Entertainment Awards	Most Popular Female Child Performer		Won	
2019	50th GMMSF Box-Office Entertainment Awards	Most Popular Female Child Performer		Won	
2019	LionheartTV Rawr Awards	Bibo of the Year		Nominated	
2020	51st GMMSF Box-Office Entertainment Awards	Box Office Queen		Won	
2020	LionhearTV Rawr Awards	Bibo of the Year	Miracle in Cell No. 7	Won	
