= Lee Hwan-kyung =

South Korean filmmaker (born 1970)

- Born: 1970 (age 55–56); South Korea
- Education: Seoul Institute of the Arts
- Occupations: Film director, screenwriter

Korean name
- Hangul: 이환경
- RR: I Hwangyeong
- MR: I Hwan'gyŏng

Lee Hwan-kyung (Korean: 이환경; born 1970) is a South Korean film director and screenwriter. Lee debuted with He Was Cool (2004). His next two features, Lump Sugar (2006) revolves around Si-eun who dreams of becoming a jockey and Champ (2011), which is based on a true story, depicts the relationship between a recently injured racehorse and the jockey who is gradually losing his eyesight. His fourth feature Miracle in Cell No. 7 (2013) became the biggest hit of the year with more than 12.32 million viewers.

His next project was the Chinese film Amazing Father and Daughter (2016), which started production at the end of 2015 and released in 2016.

== Filmography ==
Feature Films
Year	Title	Credited as			Notes	Ref.
Year	Title	Director	Writer	Producer	Notes	Ref.
1999	Rainbow Trout	1st assistant director	No	No		
2004	He Was Cool	Yes	Yes	No	Also minor acting role	
2006	Lump Sugar	Yes	Yes	No		
2011	Champ	Yes	Yes	Yes		
2013	Miracle in Cell No. 7	Yes	Yes	No		
2016	Amazing Father and Daughter	Yes	No	No	Chinese-language film debut	
2020	Best friend (also known as Good Neighbor)	Yes	Yes	Yes	Executive producer	

== Accolades ==
=== Awards and nominations ===
Award	Year	Category	Recipient(s)	Outcome	Ref
14th Chunsa Film Art Awards	2006	Best New Director	Lump Sugar	Won	
49th Baeksang Arts Awards	2013	Best Film	Miracle in Cell No. 7	Nominated	
49th Baeksang Arts Awards	2013	Best Screenplay	Lee Hwan-kyung (Note: Award shared with Kim Hwang-sung, Kim Young-seok)	Nominated	
50th Grand Bell Awards	2013	Best Screenplay	Lee Hwan-kyung	Won	
50th Grand Bell Awards	2013	Best Planning	Lee Hwan-kyung (Note: Award shared with Kim Min-ki and Kim Min-guk)	Won	
50th Grand Bell Awards	2013	Best Director	Lee Hwan-kyung	Nominated	
34th Blue Dragon Film Awards	2013	Most Popular Film	Miracle in Cell No. 7	Won	
34th Blue Dragon Film Awards	2013	Best Screenplay	Lee Hwan-kyung	Nominated	

=== State honors ===
Name of country, year given, and name of honor
Country	Ceremony	Year	Honor or Award	Ref.
South Korea	Korean Popular Culture and Arts Awards (Note: Honors are given at the Korean Popular Culture and Arts Awards, arranged by the Korea Creative Content Agency and hosted by the Ministry of Culture, Sports and Tourism. They are awarded to those who have contributed to the arts and South Korea's pop culture.)	2023	Bogwan (Precious Crown), 3rd Class	
