= 1991 Metro Manila Film Festival =

Annual Philippine Festival edition

- Date: December 25, 1991 to January 3, 1992
- Site: Manila

Highlights
- Best Picture: Ang Totoong Buhay ni Pacita M.
- Most awards: Ang Totoong Buhay ni Pacita M. (8)

Television coverage
- Network: Islands TV-13

The 17th Metro Manila Film Festival was held in 1991. Ang Totoong Buhay ni Pacita M. romped away with eight awards in the 1991 Metro Manila Film Festival including the Best Picture, Best Actress for the seventh-time awardee Nora Aunor and Best Director for Elwood Perez among others. Meanwhile, FLT Film International's Juan Tamad at Mister Shooli sa Mongolian Barbeque (The Movie) received seven awards including the Best Actor for Eric Quizon, Best Supporting Actor for Leo Martinez as well as the festival’s Second Best Picture and the recipient of Gatpuno Antonio J. Villegas Cultural Awards.

Viva Films' Darna had four awards including the festival's Third Best Picture. The Best Child Performer went to Aiza Seguerra for Regal Films' Okay Ka, Fairy Ko!: The Movie.

== Entries ==
Title	Starring	Studio	Director	Genre
Contreras Gang	Edu Manzano, Cristina Gonzales, Johnny Delgado, Monsour del Rosario, Rez Cortez, Willie Revillame, Dindo Arroyo, Eric Francisco, Kevin Delgado	Moviestars Production	Pepe Marcos	Action
Darna	Nanette Medved, Edu Manzano, Nida Blanca, Bing Loyzaga, Dennis Padilla, Atong Redillas, Pilar Pilapil and Tonton Gutierrez	Viva Films	Joel Lamangan	Superhero
Juan Tamad at Mister Shooli: Mongolian Barbecue	Eric Quizon, Jun Urbano, Jackie Lou Blanco, Leo Martinez, Caridad Sanchez, Berting Labra, Lou Veloso	FLT Films International	Jun Urbano	Drama, Comedy
Magdalena S. Palacol Story	Alma Moreno, Tobi Alejar, Gardo Versoza, Allan Paule, Robert Arevalo, Orestes Ojeda, Alicia Alonzo	Omega Releasing Organization	Junn Cabreira	Action, Drama
Okay Ka, Fairy Ko!	Vic Sotto, Aiza Seguerra, Tweetie de Leon, Larry Silva, Tetchie Agbayani, Ruby Rodriguez, Jinky Oda, Bayani Casimiro, Jr., Charito Solis	M-Zet Productions	Tony Y. Reyes and Bert de Leon	Action, Comedy, Fantasy
Ang Totoong Buhay ni Pacita M.	Nora Aunor, Lotlot de Leon, Armida Siguion-Reyna, Juan Rodrigo, Marissa Delgado, Subas Herrero, Dexter Doria	MRN Film International	Elwood Perez	Drama
Shake, Rattle & Roll III	Kris Aquino, Manilyn Reynes, Janice de Belen, Ogie Alcasid, Rosemarie Gil, Joey Marquez, Gina Alajar, Joel Torre	Regal Films	Peque Gallaga and Lore Reyes	Horror, Comedy

== Winners and nominees ==
=== Awards ===
Winners are listed first, highlighted with boldface and indicated with a double dagger (‡). Nominees are also listed if applicable.

Best Film	Best Director
**Ang Totoong Buhay ni Pacita M. - MRN Film International**‡; Juan Tamad at Mister Shooli: Mongolian Barbecue - FLT Films International (2nd Best Picture); Darna - VIVA Films (3rd Best Picture); Contreras Gang - Moviestars Production; Magdalena S. Palacol Story -Omega Releasing Organization	**Elwood Perez – Ang Totoong Buhay ni Pacita M.**‡
Best Actor	Best Actress
**Eric Quizon – Juan Tamad at Mister Shooli: Mongolian Barbecue**‡	**Nora Aunor – Ang Totoong Buhay ni Pacita M.**‡
Best Supporting Actor	Best Supporting Actress
**Leo Martinez – Juan Tamad at Mister Shooli: Mongolian Barbecue**‡	**Tetchie Agbayani – Okay Ka, Fairy Ko!**‡
Best Art Direction	Best Cinematography
**Edel Templonuevo – Juan Tamad at Mister Shooli: Mongolian Barbecue**‡	**Johnny Arajo - Juan Tamad at Mister Shooli: Mongolian Barbecue**‡
Best Child Performer	Best Editing
**Aiza Seguerra – Okay Ka, Fairy Ko!**‡	**George Jarlego - Ang Totoong Buhay ni Pacita M.**‡
Best Story	Best Screenplay
**Ricky Lee – Ang Totoong Buhay ni Pacita M.**‡	**Ricky Lee – Ang Totoong Buhay ni Pacita M.**‡
Best Original Song	Best Music
**Lucio San Pedro – Ang Totoong Buhay ni Pacita M.**‡	**Danny Tan – Ang Totoong Buhay ni Pacita M.**‡
Best Visual Effects	Best Make-up
**Carlos Lacap – Darna**‡	**Cecille Baun – Darna**‡
Best Sound Recording
**Gaudencio Barredo - Juan Tamad at Mister Shooli: Mongolian Barbecue**‡
Gatpuno Antonio J. Villegas Cultural Awards
**Juan Tamad at Mister Shooli: Mongolian Barbecue - FLT Film International**‡

=== Special awards ===
**Special Recognition Award**	Victoriano Ramos Villanueva (a.k.a. "Torbillano")
**Posthumous Award for Film Service and Excellence**	Carmen Rosales
**Posthumous Award for Film Service and Excellence**	Robert "Bobby" Talavis
**Posthumous Award for Film Service and Excellence**	Leroy Salvador Jr.
**Posthumous Award for Film Service and Excellence**	Lamberto Avellana

== Multiple awards ==
Awards	Film
8	Ang Totoong Buhay ni Pacita M.
7	Juan Tamad at Mister Shooli: Mongolian Barbecue
3	Darna

Preceded by 1990 Metro Manila Film Festival	Metro Manila Film Festival; 1991	Succeeded by 1992 Metro Manila Film Festival
