= List of Momay episodes =

Momay is a 2010 Philippine romantic comedy fantasy drama television series loosely based on the comic novel of the same name created by Elena M. Patron and directed by Darnel Joy R. Villaflor, Manny Q. Palo, and Jojo A. Saguin. The series stars child actress Xyriel Manabat in her title role as Miley Buenavidez, with an ensemble cast consisting of Maliksi Morales, Ejay Falcon, Lorna Tolentino, Glydel Mercado, Tyron Perez, and Queenie Padilla, with Lito Pimentel, Pinky Amador, Allan Paule, Eda Nolan, Bettina Carlos, and William Lorenzo in their supporting roles. The series aired from May 24 to September 17, 2010, on ABS-CBN's Primetime Bida nighttime block, replacing Tanging Yaman and was replaced by Kokey at Ako.

== Overview ==
Year	Episode numbers	No. of episodes	First aired	Last aired
2010	1–85	85	May 24, 2010	September 17, 2010

== Episodes ==
=== 2010 ===
==== Episodes 1–85 ====
No.	Title	Original release date
1	"Ang Simula" "La Vida Funland"	May 24, 2010
Out of his gratitude for his late foster parents, Donnie grants his sister Hillary's demand and gives her half of La Vida Funland's ownership. However, Donnie succumbs to cancer, leaving Shirley and their children, Miley and JJ, for all eternity.
2	"Shirley" "Si JJ"	May 25, 2010
Hillary's wrong decision leads to an accidental explosion, leaving several La Vida Funland employees hurt, and worst, dead. The husband of one of the casualties vows to avenge his wife and threatens Shirley's family.
3	"Sunog" "Sundo"	May 26, 2010
Miley's life is put in danger when she tries to save JJ from their burning house. Upon following her aunt Hillary to the hospital, Miley gets the shock of her life when she sees her unconscious body and realizes that she is now a spirit.
4	"Pagpasok sa Hardin ng Buhay" "Si Shirley"	May 27, 2010
Thinking about the escalating hospital expenses, Hillary takes advantage of Shirley's sedation and decides to end Miley's life support. Still devastated about Miley's sudden death, Shirley runs off, leaving her son JJ in Hillary's ruthless hands.
5	"Si Andrew" "Mundong Ibabaw"	May 28, 2010
With Shirley's sudden disappearance, JJ is left under his aunt Hillary's care. Hillary takes over Shirley's spot and announces her dominion over La Vida Funland. Worried about her family, Miley asks Rose to allow her to return to the mortal world.
6	"Multo at mga Pilyo" "Natuklasan ni Andro"	May 31, 2010
Momay uses her newly-acquired skill to scare away people who try to break into her family's home, stirring up rumors about the existence of a ghost in the neighborhood. Momay becomes friends with Andrew, who starts seeing her after an accident.
7	"Momay at Andro" "Bahay nila Andro"	June 1, 2010
Momay attempts to make it up to Andrew after he discovered that his playmate is a ghost. Meanwhile, Hillary worries over a fortune told by Madam Perla.
8	"Tulong ni Andro" "Walang Iwanan"	June 2, 2010
Momay and Andrew start looking for the former's brother by sneaking into La Vida Funland. Momay later returns Andrew's favor when he and his family almost get in trouble for their illegal gambling business.
9	"Bahay nina Momay" "Pamumuno ni Hillary"	June 3, 2010
Andrew's ghost friend Momay turns as his savior when he encounters bullies. As Molly's illegal gambling business gets raided by the police, Andrew gets Momay's approval to let his family stay in her house.
10	"Si Justin" "Paggiba sa Bahay"	June 4, 2010
Hillary’s fortuneteller feels Momay’s presence when the friendly ghost brings Andrew to La Vida Funland. Meanwhile, Hillary orders Justin to lead the demolition of Momay's house.
11	"Tunay na Katauhan ni Justin" "Justin aka JJ"	June 7, 2010
Failing to accomplish Hillary’s task, Justin is demoted to being a janitor. After having a conversation with La Vida Funland’s lawyer, Hillary begins searching for the title of the theme park.
12	"Magkapatid" "Tulong ni Andro"	June 8, 2010
After discovering the date of her death, Momay realizes that her little brother may be a grownup now. Convinced that Justin may somehow be linked to JJ or Shirley, Andrew and Momay head over to La Vida Funland to look for him.
13	"Paano maniniwala si JJ?" "Nakalimot na si JJ"	June 9, 2010
Momay makes new discoveries about herself and her estranged family as she and Andrew stalk Justin. Much to her dismay, she also learns that Hillary is the new owner of La Vida Funland.
14	"Si Alyssa" "Susuko na si Momay"	June 10, 2010
A dying Perla entrusts to Alyssa all the things she left in La Vida Funland. Justin is forced to confront his painful and traumatic past as he witnesses series of deaths at the hospital.
15	"Parusa ni Gary" "Andro Payaso"	June 11, 2010
Andrew follows Justin everywhere in La Vida Funland just to make him believe that Momay can talk to him. Alyssa gets hired as Hillary’s new fortuneteller.
16	"Pagtutulungan ni Andro at Alyssa" "Kapatid"	June 14, 2010
Momay and Andrew meet the amateur palmist of La Vida Funland, Alyssa. She can feel Momay's presence and agrees to help convince Justin that Andrew can see his sister.
17	"Si Mando" "Bagong Buhay ni JJ"	June 15, 2010
Adamant in helping Momay reunite with his estranged brother, Alyssa resorts to aggressive methods in hopes of convincing Justin to listen to her and Andrew.
18	"Si Britney" "Kababalaghan sa Bahay"	June 16, 2010
With a cruel mother, sister, and a drunk father, Andro cannot help but feel unloved by his family. Meanwhile, when Momay discovers that Justin is living under Hillary's roof, she decides to move around the house to attend to Justin's needs.
19	"Sanib" "Solusyon ni Alyssa"	June 17, 2010
Momay and Justin reunite and successfully find a way to communicate somehow. Soon, the siblings are faced with another mission to fulfill. However, Justin is all too reluctant to do it.
20	"Sasniban ni Momay" "Momay is in trouble"	June 18, 2010
Alyssa learns from Madame Perla's book that a ghost may possess another person's body in order to carry out its missions easily. Meanwhile, Momay suddenly gets trapped inside a woman's body who is dying from a gunshot.
21	"Away ni Momay at JJ" "Bintang kay JJ"	June 21, 2010
Momay wakes up on a hospital bed and inside the body of one Libra Monte. She immediately takes advantage of the situation and goes directly to Justin. However, her carelessness results to bumping into Hillary inside the house.
22	"Napalayas si JJ"	June 22, 2010
Justin becomes the subject of his aunt and cousin's cruelty once again as they accuse him of stealing. Left with no choice but to leave the house, Justin goes to live in La Vida Funland, where he gets reminded of his family's painful past.
23	"Nasaan ang Diyamante"	June 23, 2010
With her soul still stuck inside Libra's body, Momay decides to learn about the woman's real identity. She tries to discover the kind of life Libra leads, unaware of its risks.
24	"Paghahanap sa Diyamante" "Kuwento ng Buhay ni Libra"	June 24, 2010
Little by little, Momay learns the truth about Libra Monte's life. Soon, Libra's involvement with rival crime syndicates and her disloyalty to both put Momay in deep trouble.
25	"Tulong ni Momay kay Libra" "Hillary dolls"	June 25, 2010
Momay gets even more involved in Libra's affairs, especially after she meets the latter's family. Soon, Manuel gets hold of Momay while inside Libra's body, demanding her to return his diamonds in exchange for her freedom.
26	"Announcement ni Hillary" "Malas ang multo?"	June 28, 2010
Libra Monte thanks Momay in the afterlife for what she did for her and her family. After the nasty business they had with crime syndicates, another serious matter awaits Momay and Justin.
27	"Promotion ni Justin" "Detective Momay"	June 29, 2010
The employees of La Vida Funland go on strike after Hillary announced that the board will be laying some of them off. In their own ways, Justin and Momay try to knock some sense into her and make her change her mind.
28	"Hillary at Gary" "Oh my, Hillary!"	June 30, 2010
Justin resorts to getting legal assistance to talk Hillary out of dismissing her employees in La Vida Funland. His lawyer advises that she sell some of Funland's branches instead of letting go of people who may take their complaints to court.
29	"Hamon sa Bagong Trabaho" "Momay sa School"	July 1, 2010
Momay learns that Hillary has been keeping secrets from Justin. Hillary's worries grow worse when she receives a threatening message and hears news of a ghost haunting La Vida Funland.
30	"Alyssa at Justin" "Tulong ni Raven"	July 2, 2010
Aside from being frequently haunted by Momay, another terror haunts Hillary after she is attacked by a masked figure in a parking lot. Her family rushes to her side to comfort her.
31	"Matutuklasan ni Momay" "Hindi Pagkakaintindihan"	July 5, 2010
Upon seeing Gary violently reprimanding Justin for his failure to accomplish his job, Mickey disciplines Gary. Luck is not on Justin's side as Hillary suspects him of being the mysterious guy who harmed her last night.
32	"Nakaraan ni JJ" "Si Andro at Nanay Molly"	July 6, 2010
Hillary confides in Mando that she is being kind to Justin only because he is the real heir of La Vida Funland. As Justin attends his first day of school, Alyssa helps him cope with their lessons.
33	"Lola COnchita" "Nasaan si Shirley"	July 7, 2010
Since Molly is sick, Andrew volunteers to do her job of delivering meat to her buyers. He finds himself in hot water when he disregards Momay's warning after she learned that the meat shop is selling double-dead meat.
34	"Recitation sa classes" "Ideya ni JJ"	July 8, 2010
As Andrew and Momay go around the city to look for the latter's mother, they unexpectedly come across Raul's group. Meanwhile, Justin accompanies Rowel to the home for the aged, where he sees a familiar face on the bulletin board.
35	"Lola Conchita at kanyang anak"	July 9, 2010
With no one else to ask aside from the unapproachable Conchita, Justin is left with no choice but to look into the facility's files in hopes of finding his mother. Meanwhile, Gary starts to court Alyssa.
36	"Nakaraan ni Lola Conchita" "Paghahanap ni JJ kay Lola Conchita"	July 12, 2010
Gary tries to woo Alyssa in front of his La Vida Funland employees. Justin, on the other hand, accidentally spills to Alyssa that he is jealous of Gary. Meanwhile, Raul does Andrew dirty by claiming that the latter is cheating on their exam.
37	"Misteryo sa Pagkawala ni Shirley" "Katotohanan sa pagkawala ni Shirley"	July 13, 2010
To show her gratitude for helping her reunite with her daughter, Conchita shares to Justin the details she can remember about his mother. As the elders stroll around La Vida Funland, Conchita suddenly comes across someone familiar.
38	"Empleyado ng La Vida Funland" "Andro's Family Day"	July 14, 2010
Hillary orders her men to kidnap Conchita in order to keep her from telling Justin the truth about Hillary and his mother. Meanwhile, a poker game bet creates a rift between Alyssa and Gary.
39	"Aling Molly laban sa mga ka-barangay" "Nanay Molly at Andro"	July 15, 2010
Conchita ends up in a hospital where her daughter soon finds her. Upon regaining her strength, Conchita goes to meet Justin and reveals what she knows about Hillary. Meanwhile, Alyssa continues to ignore Gary's efforts to apologize.
40	"Multo ng nakaraan ni Gary" "Palaban na si Andro"	July 16, 2010
Despite Hillary's claim that it is Shirley's own decision to leave everything behind, Justin carries on with his plans to look for his mother. Meanwhile, Andrew's family surprisingly attends the school's family day.
41	"Hillary at La Vida Funland"	July 19, 2010
Hillary fires her employees who are members of the union against her management. With Justin also attending the union's meetings, the workers start suspecting that he is Hillary's spy in the group.
42	"Owner ng La Vida Funland?" "Sikreto ni Shirley"	July 20, 2010
With the belief that Justin was the one who ratted them out, the former workers of La Vida Funland take their revenge on him. Presuming that his relationship with Alyssa is getting better, Gary starts preparing surprises for her again.
43	"Bayanihan sa La Vida Funland" "Mga plano ni Hillary"	July 21, 2010
To get Justin's ownership of La Vida Funland, Hillary prepares his regularization papers and secretly slips the documents for transferring of inheritance in it to get his signature. However, Justin agrees to sign the papers on one condition.
44	"Byahe papuntang Bicol" "Shirley is alive!"	July 22, 2010
As she continuously succeeds with her plans, Hillary reminisces how Donnie's adoption made her share everything with him. Justin finds out that Shirley did not go abroad, leaving Hillary worried that she might break his trust.
45	"Justin at Shirley" "Pagpaparamdam ni Momay"	July 23, 2010
With the news about Shirley's road accident, Justin and Fred decide to go to the province to confirm the victim’s identity. Meanwhile, Hillary successfully transfers Justin's inheritance of La Vida Funland to her account.
46	"Portable third eye" "Mahiwagang kristal"	July 26, 2010
As Justin continues to search for their missing mother, Momay sees Shirley at a train stop. Unbeknownst to them, Hillary orders her men to increase the drug they are giving to Shirley.
47	"Justin sa Cebu" "Hindi safe sa La Vida Funland"	July 27, 2010
Despite Hillary's discouragement of Justin, Momay finally gets the chance to tell him that she saw their mother at the train station. The next day, a determined Hillary goes to Shirley's old house to find La Vida Funland's title.
48	"Sundo ni Momay" "Solusyon ni Justin"	July 28, 2010
Remembering her misdeed against Momay, Hillary asks Mando to help her catch the ghost. The next day, the scheming Hillary assigns Justin to La Vida Funland's Cebu branch.
49	"Bulaklak ng Buhay" "Ideya ni Justin"	July 29, 2010
Finding the crystals insufficient, Mando decides to perform a ritual to get rid of Momay. The wandering ghost then sets off to escape upon seeing the ceremony's divine light.
50	"Nakaraan ni Mickey"	July 30, 2010
As Mando summons the divine light to take her, Momay seeks refuge in a church. But she soon gains more time on Earth upon meeting a mysterious woman. Meanwhile, Justin outshines Gary during their board meeting.
51	"Tulong ni Momay at Andro"	August 2, 2010
Andrew urges Momay to tell Justin that her prolonged stay on Earth comes with a price. Hillary heaves a sigh of relief with the damage control plan Gary's team came up with but soon discovers who is really behind it.
52	"Alyssa at Justin sa jeep" "Matutuklasan ni Gary"	August 3, 2010
Momay gives Alyssa a love letter under Justin's name. While Alyssa feels delighted reading it, Justin gets furious with the young girl for meddling with his affairs. Meanwhile, Mickey's dark secrets haunt him.
53	"Pagkatao ni Alyssa " "Mary at Kate"	August 4, 2010
Following Momay's advice, Justin asks Alyssa out on a date. On the other hand, Gary tries to woo Alyssa back but faces rejection instead. Seeing his son sad and dejected, Hillary swears to avenge Gary's broken heart.
54	"Andro at Britney" "Traydor sa La Vida Funland"	August 5, 2010
Instead of being grateful after getting saved, Alyssa blames Justin for their spoiled night. Gary confronts Justin upon learning that the latter is courting Alyssa.
55	"Alaala ni Shirley" " Pagtago ni Hillary kay Shirley"	August 6, 2010
Raven visits Joel in jail and assures him that with Alyssa's help, their wicked plans against the Buenavidez are about to unfold. Blaming Justin for Gary's misery, Hillary is more determined to steal La Vida Funland.
56	"Mga plano ni Raven" "Nawawalang Bulaklak ng Buhay"	August 9, 2010
Hearing Hillary's determination to find the person behind the scandal, Raven tampers with her co-worker's cellphone. Fred and Mickey seal their deal on keeping the latter's dark secret.
57	"Lola ni Mando" "Pagpapalayas kay Momay"	August 10, 2010
Mando introduces Hillary to his grandmother whom he believes is capable of banishing the ghost that haunts the woman. Justin obtains information about Shirley's whereabouts.
58	"Birthday na ni Justin" "Sorpresang regalo"	August 11, 2010
Seeing the flower turn from a bud to a blossomed one, Momay realizes that her time on Earth is running out. Despite this, she refuses to tell Justin about it. Meanwhile, Justin's suspicions against Shirley grow.
59	"Tiwala" "Ritwal para mawala ang multo"	August 12, 2010
Hillary finally wins the approval of Tale. Soon, she hires Leon as her new security guard, unaware that he was her masked attacker. Meanwhile, Justin takes Momay's "Flower of Life" and gives it to Alyssa.
60	"Desisyon ni Alyssa" "Pagprotekta ni Justin kay Momay"	August 13, 2010
Andrew and Momay retrieve the "Flower of Life" from Alyssa. Meanwhile, Hillary gives Tale a picture of Momay, which the old woman pins on a voodoo doll. Later that evening, while Tale performs a ritual, Momay suddenly weakens.
61	"Pagdamay ni Momay kay Justin" "Natuklasan ni Justin"	August 16, 2010
Justin gets abducted by unidentified men. Raven overhears a conversation between Hillary and her lawyer. Inkang Tale performs a ritual that weakens Momay on her brother's birthday.
62	"Justin, lalaban na!" "Pigilan ang masasamang plano"	August 17, 2010
Fred forbids Britney from returning to her work at the La Vida Funland. Hillary and Mando resort to another trick when the witch doctor's blood spell fails.
63	"5 Million" "Laban ni Hillary"	August 18, 2010
Alyssa's conscience drives her to consider breaking up with Justin. Meanwhile, Justin realizes Hillary's plan to get rid of Momay. Mickey overhears his wife seeking advice on how to claim La Vida Funland for herself.
64	"Last will and testament" "Shirley, Momay, at Justin"	August 19, 2010
While Alyssa ends their relationship, Justin discovers his right and claim to La Vida Funland. Shirley rages as she demands to see her young children.
65	"Ganti ni Hillary" "Pagpapanggap"	August 20, 2010
Hillary blames Momay for letting Justin discover his rights to La Vida Funland, driving her to seek help from Inkang Tale once more. Momay and Andrew tail the witch doctor to stop her from harming the ghost child.
66	"Bintang kay Justin" "Paramdam ni Momay"	August 23, 2010
Justin gets abducted by unidentified men. Raven overhears a conversation between Hillary and her lawyer. Inkang Tale performs a ritual that weakens Momay on her brother's birthday.
67	"Itim na usok" "Bagong ritwal"	August 24, 2010
Justin decides to file a case against Hillary as he fights for the ownership of La Vida Funland. However, this proves to be difficult as he needs substantial pieces of evidence to win. Meanwhile, Alyssa backs out from Raven and Joel's plan.
68	"Paubos na oras" "Dra. Villegas"	August 25, 2010
Determined to get Justin off her back, Hillary tries to set her nephew up. Meanwhile, Shirley slowly begins to recover from the tragic death of her daughter. Momay, on the other hand, is running out of time to complete her tasks on Earth.
69	"Paggaling ni Shirley" "Kasamaan ni Hillary"	August 26, 2010
Despite Alyssa's denial of having any affection for Justin, she still helps the young man regain his freedom. Momay recognizes a symbol at Hillary's office that is crucial to the fulfillment of her task. Hillary pays Shirley an unexpected visit.
70	"Ang vault" "Aksidente ni Andro"	August 27, 2010
Shirley pretends to remain traumatized in front of Hillary and Dra. Villegas to give her more time to plan for her escape. Meanwhile, Inkang Tale begins the ritual to get rid of Momay, sending a deadly cloud to the ghost child.
71	"Multo na si Andro?" "Pagtuklas ni Momay"	August 30, 2010
Despite the failure of Inkang Tale's ritual, Momay still weakens as the Flower of Life begins to wilt. Meanwhile, Justin catches Dra. Villegas with Hillary and decides to trail behind them.
72	"Tunay na magkakapatid" "Operasyon ni Andro"	August 31, 2010
Equipped with what she claims to be a legal document, Hillary forces Justin to leave the house. On his way out, Justin loses an important key. Later, Momay and Andrew return for the lost item, unaware of the danger they are soon to face.
73	"Tulong ni Hillary" "Paglalakbay ni Andro"	September 1, 2010
With a seal preventing Momay from entering her own home, Andrew ventures inside the haunted house to find Justin's lost key. However, misfortune befalls the young boy when Hillary catches him and gets hold of Donnie's last will.
74	"Tatay ni Justin" "Pagkatao ni Justin"	September 2, 2010
Momay looks for Donnie's last will in Hillary's home with the help of Andrew's new ghostly form, only to discover Justin's true identity. Shirley remains determined to find her way out of captivity.
75	"Pagtakas ni Shirley" "Pamilya ni Shirley"	September 3, 2010
Fred blackmails Mickey for the money he needs to finance Andrew's operation. Joel finally regains his freedom with the help of his supportive daughter Raven. Shirley finds a chance to escape.
76	"Ligtas na si Andro" "Magkapatid na Justin at Gary"	September 6, 2010
Determined to uncover Mickey's most-kept secret, Molly tries to use Fred's dire situation to her advantage in order to get the information she wants.
77	"Patibong ni Inkang Tale" "Plano ni Haillary at Dra. Villegas"	September 7, 2010
Hillary gets the shock of her life when she finally discovers the secret Mickey has been keeping from her for several years.
78	"Paghahanap kay Momay" "Dra. Villegas as Momay"	September 8, 2010
As his past catches up to him, Mickey grows anxious that Justin may suffer the consequences of his mistakes. Shirley tries to escape from captivity anew. Momay urges Andro to return to his body as he runs out of time.
79	"Pagkikita nina Justin at Shirley" "Pamilya"	September 9, 2010
After hearing Mickey's revelation, Justin decides to cut all ties between them. Gary, meanwhile, gets involved in a car accident as he vents out his anger.
80	"Pagbagsak ni Hillary" "Paglanta ng Bulaklak"	September 10, 2010
Seeking revenge and retribution, Hillary deduces that the only way she can return and inflict the same pain she withstood against Justin is to take away Momay.
81	"Paraan ni Momay" "Huling Halakhak"	September 13, 2010
Momay seizes the opportunity to escape from the tumbler and possess Judy's body. With Judy's body under her full control, the ghost tries to help Shirley escape from Hillary's clutches.
82	"Puso ni Justin" "Huling Hiling"	September 14, 2010
With Momay's help, Shirley finally escapes from Hillary's tight clutches and soon makes an emotional reunion with her son Justin after 15 years of separation.
83	"Episode 83"	September 15, 2010
Hillary remains adamant in holding onto La Vida Funland despite Shirley’s return. Meanwhile, an old enemy with an insatiable hunger for revenge makes a comeback.
84	"Episode 84"	September 16, 2010
Joel takes his vengeance on Shirley and Hillary as he intends to burn them all with La Vida Funland. Shirley's salvation now lies in the hands of Kate, Justin, and Momay.
85	"Episode 85"	September 17, 2010
Hillary and Joel's desire for vengeance leads to their undoing. The tragic events that transpired leave a mark on Shirley, Justin, Kate, Mickey and Gary.
