= Jose Sison =

Filipino lawyer (1938–2026)

- Born: Jose C. Sison; April 7, 1938
- Died: July 23, 2026 (aged 88)
- Occupations: Lawyer, television presenter
- Years active: 1988–2020 (as a presenter)
- Notable work: Ipaglaban Mo!
- Spouse: Josie Sampedro
- Children: 6 (inc. Jopet)

Jose C. Sison (Tagalog: [hoˈse ˈsisɔn]; April 7, 1938 – July 23, 2026) was a Filipino lawyer and the television presenter of Ipaglaban Mo!.

== Early life and education ==
Jose C. Sison was born on April 7, 1938. He studied at the University of Santo Tomas from elementary to college. He obtained his bachelor's degree in 1957. He also graduated from the Ateneo de Manila University and passed the Philippine Bar Examinations.

== Career ==
Sison was known for being the host of the drama anthology Ipaglaban Mo! which featured real life legal cases brought to the Supreme Court. It first aired on IBC in 1988 before it transferred to ABS-CBN from 1992 to 1999 and RPN from 1999 to 2000 and from 2004 to 2005. The full title of the series was Kapag May Katwiran... Ipaglaban Mo! which also became a catchphrase that is attributed to him.

In 1995, Sison appeared (as himself) in Ipaglaban Mo: The Movie, which was written by National Artist Ricky Lee and directed by Marilou Diaz-Abaya. In 1997, Sison reprised his role in Ipaglaban Mo: The Movie II, which was also written by Lee and directed by Rory Quintos.

Sison reprised his role when Kapag nasa Katwiran, Ipaglaban Mo! aired on GMA News TV (now GTV) from 2012 to 2013. He was joined by his son Jopet Sison as co-host. The Sisons remained hosts of Ipaglaban Mo! during its second ABS-CBN run producing new episodes from 2014 to 2020 when production halted due to the COVID-19 pandemic with reruns aired until 2024.

== Personal life and death ==
Sison was married to Josefina "Josie" Sampedro with whom he had six children; the eldest being a daughter and the rest being his sons including Jopet.

Sison died on July 23, 2026, at the age of 88. His wake was being held in Quezon City and he would be interred in Antipolo, Rizal.
