= Burlesk King =

- Directed by: Mel Chionglo
- Written by: Ricky Lee
- Starring: Rodel Velayo; Leonardo Litton; Nini Jacinto; Elizabeth Oropesa; Raymond Bagatsing; Cherry Pie Picache
- Distributed by: Seiko Films
- Release date: March 10, 1999
- Running time: 115 minutes
- Country: Philippines
- Language: Filipino

Burlesk King is the second film in the gay-themed trilogy of Mel Chionglo and Ricky Lee about the lives of macho dancers, men who work as strippers in Manila's gay bars. The first is Sibak: Midnight Dancers; the third is Twilight Dancers. Other films exploring the same theme are Lino Brocka's Macho Dancer (1988) and Brillante Mendoza's Masahista (The Masseur, 2005).

== Plot ==
Harry went to Manila with his friend James to exact vengeance on his abusive father who used to pimp him and killed his mother. He ended up working as a Macho dancer in a gay club and became involved with a gay writer and a hooker. When he set out to look for his father to avenge his mother's death, he found him dying of AIDS in a shack in squatter's area and told him that his mother was alive after all. He looked for his mother and got reunited with her who taught him to forgive his father. His father eventually dies.

== Cast ==
- Rodel Velayo as Harry
- Leonardo Litton as James
- Elizabeth Oropesa as Betty
- Raymond Bagatsing as Mario
- Cherry Pie Picache as Aileen
- Gino Ilustre as Michael
- Nini Jacinto as Brenda
- Joonee Gamboa as Miong
- Joel Lamangan as Odette
- Tonio Ortigas as Leo
- Ross Rival
- Frannie Zamora
- Joseph Buncalan
- Arthur Cassanova
- Joey Galvez
- Joseph Pe
- Sofia Valdez
- Aila Marie
