= Mel Chionglo =

Filipino film director and production designer (1946–2019)

- Born: Carmelo Chionglo; July 16, 1946; Lucena, Quezon, Philippines
- Died: September 21, 2019 (aged 73); Manila, Philippines
- Occupations: Film director, production designer
- Years active: 1977–2016

Carmelo Chionglo (July 16, 1946 – September 21, 2019), better known as Mel Chionglo, was a Filipino film director and production designer. He has directed more than 40 films since 1981.

From 1966 to 1976, he worked and studied acting and directing at the New York Academy of Theatrical Arts. Returning to Manila, he worked as production designer. His directorial debut was Regal Films' Playgirl (1981).

He was one of the founding members of the Directors’ Guild of the Philippines Inc. He also served as board member on the Movie and Television Review and Classification Board.

== Career ==
Chionglo began working in the film industry as production designer on such films as Mike de Leon's Itim, Lino Brocka's Mother, Sister, Daughter, and Eddie Romero's Aguila.

He directed Playgirl, his first film, in 1981. It was scripted by Ricardo Lee and starred Gina Alajar.

He also directed Sibak: Midnight Dancers, Burlesk King, Iadya Mo Kami, Lauriana, and Nasaan Ka Nang Kailangan Kita. Burlesk King was screened at the 2000 Berlin International Film Festival.

== Filmography ==
- Itim (Rites of May) (1976) (production designer)
- Salawahan (1979) (production designer)
- Temptation Island (1980) (production designer)
- Aguila (1980) (art director)
- Playgirl (1981) (director); starring Gina Alajar
- Sibak: Midnight Dancers (1994) (director)
- Lagarista (2000) (director); starring Piolo Pascual
- Burlesk King (1999) (director)
- Lucia (1992) (director); written by Lino Brocka; starring Lolita Rodriguez and Gina Alajar
- Twilight Dancers (2006) (director)
