= Twilight Dancers =

- Directed by: Mel Chionglo
- Written by: Ricky Lee
- Starring: Tyron Perez; Allen Dizon; Lauren Novero; Terence Baylon; Cherry Pie Picache
- Release date: October 2006
- Running time: 105 minutes
- Country: Philippines
- Language: Filipino

Twilight Dancers is the last installment of director Mel Chionglo and writer Ricky Lee's trilogy about Macho Dancers. The first part was Sibak: Midnight Dancers in 1994, and the second part was Burlesk King in 1999. The trilogy took inspiration from Lino Brocka's film Macho Dancer in 1988.

== Plot ==
Twilight Dancers offers a disturbing yet a humorous look at the country's social realities through the eyes of three macho dancers or male strippers.

One of them is Dwight (Tyron Perez), young and at the peak of his trade, who loses the girl he loves to a politician's son. Then there is Alfred, who at 28 is past his prime and is kicked out of the club. Finally is Bert, 30, who has long since given up dancing and is now the bodyguard-driver of a corrupt businesswoman. But Bert's boss, Madame Loca (Cherry Pie Picache), manipulates the events that push the three dancers to fight for survival, and to finally confront issues of love, friendship and betrayal.

Adding to these conflicts are a deaf-mute wife who refuses to go back to her macho dancer husband, a director who keeps promising stardom to a male dancer named Michael (Terence Baylon), a transvestite performer who fakes being a virgin as well, a tyrannical mayor who cross-dresses at his birthday party, and a union leader who gets shot by an assassin in broad daylight.

But as their club's manager Taurus always says, "They are only here to serve the carnal desires of men. The show has to go on." Twilight Dancers is the third movie from director Mel Chionglo about Philippine's macho dancer industry.

== Cast ==
- Tyron Perez as Dwight
- Lauren Novero as Bert
- Allen Dizon as Alfred
- Cherry Pie Picache as Madam Loca
- Ana Capri as Miriam
- William Martinez
- Joel Lamangan
- Jerry Lopez Sineneng
- Arnel Ignacio
- Glaiza de Castro
- J.E. Sison
- IC Mendoza as Hazel
- Terence Baylon as Michael
- Kris Martinez
- Chester Nolledo
