= Sibak: Midnight Dancers =

- DVD poster
- Directed by: Mel Chionglo
- Written by: Ricky Lee
- Starring: Noni Buencamino; Lawrence David; Gandong Cervantes; Alex Del Rosario
- Release dates: September 9, 1994 (TIFF); July 5, 1995 (Philippines); September 28, 1995 (United States)
- Running time: 100 minutes
- Country: Philippines
- Language: Filipino

Sibak: Midnight Dancers is a 1994 Philippines film, and the first of a series of three gay-themed movies by Mel Chionglo and Ricky Lee about the lives of macho dancers (strippers) in the gay bars of Manila. The later two are Burlesk King and Twilight Dancers. All three follow in the tradition of Lino Brocka's 1988 film Macho Dancer. This movie was banned in the Philippines.

== Plot ==
The story revolves around the lives of three brothers who work as strippers in a gay bar in Ermita, Manila. The oldest, Joel, has a wife and a boyfriend. Dennis, the middle brother, steals car radios with his friends. The youngest, Sonny, dropped out of college and has a transsexual lover.

== Cast ==
- Nonie Buencamino as Dave
- Lawrence David as Sonny
- Gandong Cervantes as Dennis
- Alex Del Rosario as Joel
- Luis Cortes
- Danny Ramos
- Richard Cassity
- John Mendoza
- Leonard Manalansan
- Perla Bautista as Mother
- Ryan Aristorenas as Bogart
- Soxie Topacio as Dominic
- Maureen Mauricio as Zeny
- Ray Ventura as Gregorio

== Reception ==
The film received positive reviews from the Toronto Film Festival. However, the film was banned by the Movie and Television Review and Classification Board.
