= Darna (1991 film) =

- Official movie poster
- Directed by: Joel Lamangan
- Screenplay by: Frank G. Rivera
- Story by: Eddie Rodriguez; Bey Vito
- Based on: Darna by Mars Ravelo
- Produced by: William Leary
- Starring: Nanette Medved
- Cinematography: Ramon Marcelino
- Edited by: Ike Jarlego Jr.
- Music by: Willy Cruz
- Distributed by: Viva Films
- Release date: December 25, 1991
- Running time: 108 minutes
- Country: Philippines
- Language: Filipino

Darna is a 1991 Filipino superhero film directed by Joel Lamangan in his directorial debut. Based on the Philippine comic character of the same name, the film stars Nanette Medved in the title role, alongside Nida Blanca, Edu Manzano, Pilar Pilapil, Tonton Gutierrez, Bing Loyzaga, Dennis Padilla, and Atong Redillas.

Darna was released through Viva Films on December 25, 1991, as part of the 17th Metro Manila Film Festival. The film was a box-office bomb.

== Plot ==
In the early 1900s, explorer Dominico Lipolico encounters a sinister relic in the Amazon jungle that gives him immortality in exchange for fomenting evil. In the Philippines in 1975, Narda and her younger brother Dong live with their grandmother Sabel, who took care of them after their parents died. One night, while playing with other children, Narda heard a voice of a young lady. The lady was an angel and told her that she will be the defender of the people and will be known as Darna. As Narda and Dong was about to go home, a meteor appeared and a small beam of light came and went straight to Narda's mouth and swallowed. She recalled about her conversation with the Angel and when she said the name Darna, ang explosion occurred. In the present day, Narda would grew up as a beautiful lady with her grandmother Sabel brother Dong and adopted brother Ding. She also works in Manila as a reporter for a local newspaper with her fellow writer George and photographer Buster. Dominico, moves his operations to the Philippines to spread his deeds, posing himself as a philanthropist and businessman. Narda, would use her powers as Darna to prevent crime and violence all over Metro Manila, much to the fury and jealousy of Police Sergeant Barurot.

At the welcome party for Dominico, he invited renowned fashion designer Valentina. There, she was transformed into a monster with snakes in her head. She will also be recognized by wearing her turban and presented her a gift, a snake named Vibora.

Valentina lures Darna at an event by releasing snakes to kill the audience, to which Darna comes to the rescue. Valentina's talking pet snake, Vibora discovers Darna's transformation into Narda, which enables Valentina to capture her. At Dominico's lair, Dominico forces Darna to join him by threatening her grandmother and siblings but is thwarted by her siblings rescuing Darna before she is fully transformed. Darna rescues Narda's newspaper companions George and Buster from an attack by the Manananggal, killing her by luring her to a church cross, while Valentina is accidentally killed during a fight with Darna when Vibora unwittingly gives a live grenade for Valentina to throw. Darna then confronts Dominico, who reveals himself as a Devil-incarnate who goes on a burning spree. He initially overpowers Darna, but is killed when she grabs the relic that he wears as a necklace and crushes it, resulting in the disintegration of Dominico and his minions.

== Cast ==
- Nanette Medved as Narda/Darna
- Francine Prieto as young Narda
- Nida Blanca as Lola Isabel
- Edu Manzano as Dominico Lipolico
- Pilar Pilapil as Valentina
- Tonton Gutierrez as George
- Bing Loyzaga as Puring /Manananggal
- Dennis Padilla as Buster
- Atong Redillas as Ding
- Ruby Rodriguez as Vibora (Voice)
- Donna Cruz as Sally
- Tony Lambino as Dong
- Dencio Padilla
- Paolo Contis as Young Dong
- Errol Dionisio as Sgt. Barurot
- Archi Adamos
- Ray Ventura
- Boy Roque
- Jun Hidalgo
- Jim Pebanco
- Carmi Matic
- Guila Alvarez
- Roland Montes
- Vina Morales as an angel

== Release ==
Darna was released in theaters on December 25, 1991 as an entry to the 17th Metro Manila Film Festival. According to Asiaweek, the film bombed at the box office.

== Accolades ==
Group	Year	Category	Name	Result
Metro Manila Film Festival	1991	Best Picture	Darna	3rd
Metro Manila Film Festival	1991	Best Director	Joel Lamangan	Nominated
Metro Manila Film Festival	1991	Best Actress	Nanette Medved	Nominated
Metro Manila Film Festival	1991	Best Supporting Actress	Nida Blanca	Nominated
Metro Manila Film Festival	1991	Best Child Performer	Atong Redillas	Nominated
Metro Manila Film Festival	1991	Best Cinematography	Ramon Marcelino	Nominated
Metro Manila Film Festival	1991	Best Musical Score	Willy Cruz	Nominated
Metro Manila Film Festival	1991	Best Sound Recording	Rolly Ruta	Nominated
Metro Manila Film Festival	1991	Best Production Design	Benjie de Guzman	Nominated
Metro Manila Film Festival	1991	Best Make-Up	Cecille Baun	Won
Metro Manila Film Festival	1991	Best Visual Effects	Carlos Lacap	Won
FAMAS Awards	1992	Best Supporting Actress	Pilar Pilapil	Nominated
FAMAS Awards	1992	Best Child Actor	Atong Redillas	Nominated
