= Kate en Boogie =

Philippine television sitcom series

- Genre: Sitcom
- Starring: Dennis Padilla; Nanette Medved
- Country of origin: Philippines
- Original language: Tagalog

Production
- Camera setup: Multiple-camera setup
- Running time: 90 minutes
- Production company: GMA Entertainment TV

Original release
- Network: GMA Rainbow Satellite Network
- Release: July 19, 1993 – November 24, 1994

Kate en Boogie is a Philippine television sitcom series broadcast by GMA Rainbow Satellite Network. Starring Dennis Padilla and Nanette Medved, it premiered on July 19, 1993. The series concluded on November 24, 1994.

== Cast and characters ==
Lead cast

- Dennis Padilla as Boogie
- Nanette Medved as Kate

Supporting cast

- Caridad Sanchez
- Willie Revillame
- Charina Scott
- Raffy Rodriguez
- Ana Roces
- Johnny Wilson
- Smokey Manaloto
