= Jopet Sison =

Filipino lawyer, TV host, and politician

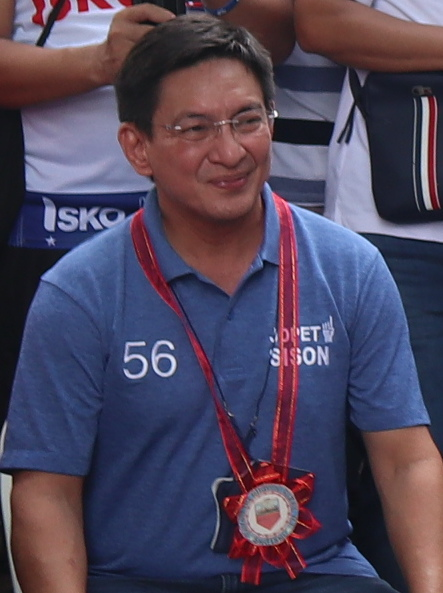
- Sison in 2022

President of National Home Mortgage Finance Corporation
- In office 2005–2012

Assistant General Manager of National Housing Authority
- In office 2001–2005

Member of the Quezon City Council from the 4th District
- In office June 30, 1992 – June 30, 1998

Member of the Sangguniang Barangay (Kagawad) of Barangay Pinagkaisahan, Quezon City
- In office 1989–1992

Personal details
- Born: Joseph Peter Sampedro Sison; October 19, 1965 (age 60) Quezon City, Rizal, Philippines
- Party: Aksyon (2021–present); PDP–Laban (2018–2019); Independent (2016); Liberal (1992–2015)
- Spouse: Cef Macalino
- Children: 3
- Parent: Jose Sison (father)
- Education: Ateneo de Manila University (BS); Manuel L. Quezon University (LLB)
- Occupation: Television host
- Profession: Lawyer

Joseph Peter "Jopet" Sampedro Sison (Tagalog: [ˈdʒɔpɛt ˈsisɔn]; born October 19, 1965) is a Filipino lawyer, television presenter, and politician known for co-hosting the legal drama anthology series Ipaglaban Mo! (2014–2020) and holding several positions in the government including being a member of the Quezon City Council from 1992 to 1998 and being the assistant general manager of the National Housing Authority from 2001 to 2005.

== Early life and education ==
Joseph Peter Sampedro Sison was born on October 19, 1965 to lawyer Jose Sison and Josefina Sampedro. Jopet Sison is the second eldest among six children.

He studied at the Ateneo de Manila University from elementary to college, when he obtained a degree in legal management in 1987. He graduated with his law degree at the Manuel L. Quezon University.

== Television ==
Sison featured in a 5-minute television segment "Ikaw at ang Batas" and "Ito ang Batas" from 1992 to 1998.

Sison joined in 2012 as a co-host of the legal drama, Ipaglaban Mo!, with his lawyer father Jose Sison when the younger Sison was still a student, until the legal drama aired its final episode on July 5, 2020. The presenters provide legal advice to the audiences alongside the dramatization of cases.

== Political career ==
Sison was elected as Barangay Kagawad for Barangay Pinagkaisahan, Quezon City from 1989 to 1992. In 1992, he ran as 4th district councilor and won. When serving as councilor, he headed the Committee on Transport and Communication as its chairman, being the Assistant Minority Floor Leader, both positions he served from 1992 to 1993 as chairman. He also was the chairman of Committee on Labor and Conciliation from 1993 to 1995, and in 1993, he was the founding chairman of Quezon City Tricycle Franchising Board until 1995.

On his second term, he served as the Assistant Majority Floor Leader and vice-chairman of the Committee on Laws, Rules and Internal Government from 1995 until 1998 and he also served as Chairman of Committee on Public Affairs and Information, Chairman of Committee on Revision of Ordinances and Consolidation of Proposed Legislative Measures, and Chairman of Blue Ribbon Committee, and Committee on Police, Peace, and Order concurrently from 1996 until 1998.

He served as chairman of the Liberal Party's Quezon City chapter until 2015.

Sison ran for vice mayor of Quezon City in 1998 and 2001 but lost to Connie Angeles and Herbert Bautista respectively. He ran for representative of Marikina's 1st district in 2016, but lost to Bayani Fernando. He then transferred back to Quezon City and ran for vice mayor in 2019 as the running mate of Vincent "Bingbong" Crisologo as mayor, but they both lost. In 2022, he ran for Senator under Aksyon Demokratiko and thus Isko Moreno's slate as Noli de Castro's substitute, but lost.

== Personal life ==
Sison is married to lawyer Cef Macalino, with whom he has three sons. He is also a businessman serving as president of the real estate firm Firmament Development Corporation since 2013.
