= Contreras Gang =

1991 action film by Pepe Marcos

- Directed by: Pepe Marcos
- Screenplay by: Humilde "Meek" Roxas
- Story by: Nomar Rodavlas; Humilde "Meek" Roxas
- Produced by: Wally Chua; Victor Villegas
- Starring: Edu Manzano; Rez Cortez; Kevin Delgado; Dindo Arroyo; Willie Revillame; Eric Francisco
- Cinematography: Rey de Leon
- Edited by: Pepe Marcos
- Music by: Mon del Rosario
- Production company: Moviestars Productions
- Distributed by: Moviestars Productions
- Release date: December 25, 1991
- Running time: 115 minutes
- Country: Philippines
- Language: Filipino

Contreras Gang is a 1991 Philippine action film directed and edited by Pepe Marcos. The film stars Edu Manzano as the gang leader, along with Rez Cortez, Kevin Delgado, Dindo Arroyo, Willie Revillame and Eric Francisco as the gang members.

Produced and distributed by Moviestars Productions, the film was theatrically released on December 25, 1991, as one of the entries in the 17th Metro Manila Film Festival.

== Plot ==
Mario Contreras comes from a rich family. His father's resentment towards him prompts him to quit college and commit various crimes with the help of his college friends Tony, Ricky, Albert, Bong, and Edwin. With their trouble-making activities hogging headlines, the Contreras Gang becomes a subject of manhunt for a group of policemen led by Sgt. Pascual and Lt. Lazaro.

== Cast ==
- Edu Manzano as Mario Contreras
- Cristina Gonzales as Nanette
- Johnny Delgado as Sgt. Pascual
- Monsour Del Rosario as Lt. Lazaro
- Rez Cortez as Tony
- Kevin Delgado as Ricky
- Dindo Arroyo as Albert
- Willie Revillame as Bong
- Eric Francisco as Edwin
- Delia Razon as Ricky's Mother
- Bon Vibar as Ricky's Father
- Marita Zobel as Mario's Mother
- Romeo Rivera as Mario's Father
- Jeena Alvarez as Mario's Sister
- Ester Chavez as Nanette's Mother
- Ross Rival as Nanette's Brother
- Tony Carreon as Beheaded Child's Grandfather
- Sunshine Dizon as Beheaded Child
- Zeny Zabala as Chinese Wife
- Sauro Cotoco as Chinese Husband
- Karen Cua as Chinsese Daughter
- Liza Mojica as Yaya
- Joseph Serra as Mr. Abaya

== Reception ==
Elvira Mata of the Manila Standard gave Contreras Gang a negative review. He criticized the flaws in the storyline, the recycled musical score used in the film and the poor drama scenes. Mata cites the fight scenes, blowing up a jewelry shop, and the grandfather seeing the head of his granddaughter in a box as the best parts of the film.

== Awards ==
Year	Awards	Category	Recipient	Result	Ref.
1991	17th Manila Film Festival	Best Picture	Contreras Gang	Nominated	
1992	40th FAMAS Awards	Best Actor	Edu Manzano	Nominated	
