= Ang Totoong Buhay ni Pacita M. =

- The Official Poster for 1991 Metro Manila Film Festival
- Directed by: Elwood Perez
- Written by: Ricardo Lee
- Produced by: George Jatico; Mely Nicandro
- Starring: Nora Aunor
- Cinematography: Ricardo Jacinto
- Edited by: George Jarlego
- Music by: Danny Tan
- Production company: MRN Films
- Release date: 25 December 1991
- Running time: 108 minutes
- Country: Philippines
- Language: Filipino

Ang Totoong Buhay ni Pacita M. (English: The True Life of Pacita M.) is a 1991 Philippine drama film directed by Elwood Perez and written by Ricky Lee. Starring Nora Aunor in the title role, the story follows a singer-entertainer in a seedy Quezon City nightclub.

Produced by MRN Films, the film was theatrically released on 25 December 1991, as an entry to the 17th Metro Manila Film Festival.

== Synopsis ==
The story follows Pacita, an aging mother and cabaret singer who works at a nightclub. Her daughter Grace is the source of her joy and inspiration in life. Her world changes suddenly after Grace is hit by a stray bullet, plunging her into a coma. This tragic event forces Pacita to reconcile with Mrs. Estrella, her wealthy mother-in-law. At first, Pacita is optimistic and hopes for her daughter's recovery. As weeks passed, she relented and succumbed to giving her daughter a dignified death by unplugging her life support system, resulting in her being sued by her mother-in-law in an arduous legal battle.

== Cast ==
Main cast

- Nora Aunor as Pacita M.
- Lotlot de Leon as Grace
- Armida Siguion-Reyna as Mrs. Estrella
- Marissa Delgado as Mamang
- Juan Rodrigo as Raul

Supporting cast

- Subas Herrero as Mrs. Estrella's lawyer
- Ernie Zarate as Pacita's defense lawyer
- Marilyn Villamayor as Raul's daughter
- Soxie Topacio as Ricky
- Eddie Infantes as priest
- Nanding Fernandez as doctor
- Christine Bersola-Babao as nurse
- Dexter Doria as barkada
- Beverly Salviejo as barkada
- Evelyn Vargas as barkada
- Jimmy Reyes as gunman
- Luis Benedicto as judge
- Edgar Santiago as pulis

== Awards and recognition ==
Year	Group	Category	Nominee	Result
1991	Metro Manila Film Festival	Best Picture		Won
1991	Metro Manila Film Festival	Best Actress	Nora Aunor	Won
1991	Metro Manila Film Festival	Best Director	Elwood Perez	Won
1991	Metro Manila Film Festival	Best Editing	George Jarlego	Won
1991	Metro Manila Film Festival	Best Story	Ricky Lee	Won
1991	Metro Manila Film Festival	Best Screenplay	Ricky Lee	Won
1991	Metro Manila Film Festival	Best Original Song	Lucio San Pedro	Won
1991	Metro Manila Film Festival	Best Music	Danny Tan	Won
1992	FAMAS Filipino Academy of Movie Arts and Sciences Awards	Best Picture		Won
1992	FAMAS Filipino Academy of Movie Arts and Sciences Awards	Best Actress	Nora Aunor	Won
1992	FAMAS Filipino Academy of Movie Arts and Sciences Awards	Best Director	Elwood Perez	Won
1992	FAMAS Filipino Academy of Movie Arts and Sciences Awards	Best Screenplay	Ricky Lee	Won
1992	FAMAS Filipino Academy of Movie Arts and Sciences Awards	Best Supporting Actress	Armida Siguion-Reyna	Nominated
1992	Gawad Urian Awards (Manunuri ng Pelikulang Pilipino)	Best Actress	Nora Aunor	Nominated
1992	Gawad Urian Awards (Manunuri ng Pelikulang Pilipino)	Best Supporting Actress	Armida Siguion-Reyna	Nominated
1992	Film Academy of the Philippines (Luna Awards)	Best Actress	Nora Aunor	Won
1992	Film Academy of the Philippines (Luna Awards)	Best Director	Elwood Perez	Won
1992	Film Academy of the Philippines (Luna Awards)	Best Screenplay	Ricky Lee	Won
1992	Star Awards for Movies (Philippine Movie Press Club)	Best Actress	Nora Aunor	Won
1992	Young Critics Circle	Best Performance by Male or Female, Adult or Child, Individual or Ensemble in Leading or Supporting Role	Nora Aunor	Won
1992	Young Critics Circle	Best Picture		Nominated
1992	Young Critics Circle	Best Screenplay	Ricky Lee	Nominated

== List of Film Festival Competed or Exhibited ==
- 1992 - Honolulu Film Festival
- 1992 - Singapore Film Festival
