= Terence Baylon =

Filipino actor

- Born: Terence Dale Niño Baylon; April 26, 1984 (age 42); Cebu City, Philippines
- Occupation: Actor·IT Engineer
- Years active: 1992–present

Terence Dale Niño Baylon (born April 26, 1984) is a Filipino actor and model. He started making movies and commercials at the age of 7. When he was 4 years old, he joined Eat Bulaga! search for Little Mr. Pogi. Although he did not win the contest, his exposure gave him the chance to be discovered by an agent in charge of getting talents for modeling agencies in the Philippines. He is more popularly known as Junjun, Vilma Santos' autistic child in the movie, Ipagpatawad Mo. He was the Grand Slam winner for best child actor in 1992.

== Biography ==
=== Early life ===
Terence Baylon is born in Cebu City, Philippines. He is the eldest of 3 siblings.

=== Career ===
Terence Baylon used to be a child star with 3 major acting awards for best child actor in the film Ipagpatawad Mo. He won FAMAS, Film Academy of the Philippines, and STAR awards best child actor category in 1992. He is the only child actor who won 3 consecutive awards in a certain category within a year, earning him a grand slam title. At the age of 12, Terence Baylon quit show business in 1996 to pursue his studies.

Now he works in London as a Senior IT Engineer. They have a talent center in Cebu which focuses on developing talented kids and teens in dancing, acting, and singing.

=== 2005–2007 ===
Making a return in the limelight using his real name, Baylon made a comeback movie titled I Wanna Be Happy together with Eddie Garcia, Cherry Pie Picache, Diana Zubiri, and Gloria Romero. He also appeared in the movie Twilight Dancers as a macho dancer. This film was shown internationally and was nominated in the Toronto International Film Festival. He was also cast together with Cristine Reyes and Mike Tan in the movie Barang. The trio must fight for their lives in this nail-biting supernatural thriller movie from the Philippines.

Terence Baylon appeared on Tweetbiz QTV Channel 11 second week of May. He is planning to make a comeback based on an interview with Justine, one of the host of the show.

Terence Baylon was invited by the Filipino community in Beirut, Lebanon to host a Christmas concert together with Amber Martinez. The show was a huge success.

=== GMA Network ===
He was also one of the cast in Now and Forever: Linlang together with Polo Ravales, Lorna Tolentino, Diana Zubiri, and Rudy Fernandez. He is Ricky in the said teleserye.

He was one of the challengers together with his partner Diana Zubiri in Extra Challenge hosted by Paolo Bediones. The episode was titled pakners.

=== ABS-CBN Network ===
Baylon made a comeback in 2013 and portrayed the role of a hunk driver in the top-rating series, Be Careful With My Heart.

== Filmography ==
=== Film ===
Year	Title	Role
1990	Kapag Langit ang Humatol	Little Oliver
1991	Ipagpatawad Mo	Jun-Jun
1993	Masahol Pa Sa Hayop	Jun
2006	I Wanna Be Happy	Mike
2006	Twilight Dancers	Michael
2006	Barang	Dave
2013	Ekstra	Police 1
TBA	Faultline	Scientist

=== Television ===
Year	Title	Role
2003	Lunch Break Muna	Host
2005–2006	Extra Challenge	Challenger
2005–2006	Daisy Siete Season 7: Ang Pitong Maria	Anton
2006	Magpakailanman: Katya Santos Story	Katya's Friend
2006	Ang Mahiwagang Baul: Si Edad at ang Puting Bantay	Puting Bantay
2006	Now and Forever: Linlang	Ricky
2013	Indio	Spanish Soldier
2013	Be Careful With My Heart	Elmer
2014	Wattpad Presents: My Tag Boyfriend	Dad of Siti

== Awards and nominations ==
Year	Award	Category	Nominated work	Result
1991	FAMAS Award	Best Child Actor	Kapag Langit ang Humatol	Nominated
1992	FAMAS Award	Best Child Actor	Ipagpatawad Mo	Won
1992	Gawad Urian Award	Best Supporting Actor	Ipagpatawad Mo	Nominated
1992	PMPC Star Awards for Movies	Best Child Actor	Ipagpatawad Mo	Won
1992	FAP Awards	Best Child Actor	Ipagpatawad Mo	Won
1994	FAMAS Award	Best Child Actor	Masahol Pa Sa Hayop	Nominated
