= Juan dela Cruz =

National personification of the Philippines

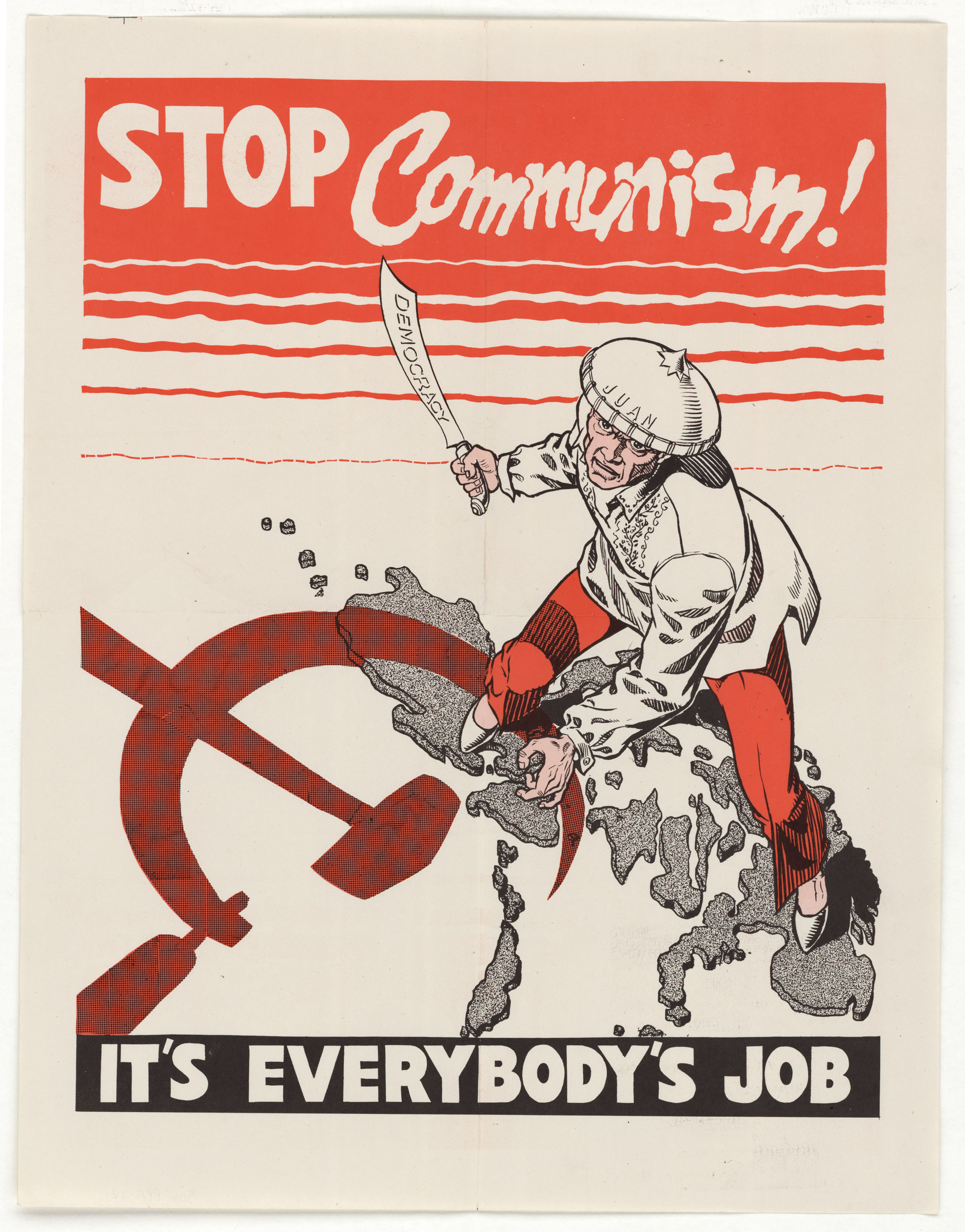
United States Information Service poster distributed in Asia depicting Juan dela Cruz ready to defend the Philippines from the threat of communism

Juan dela Cruz or Maria dela Cruz (feminized form) is the national personification of the Philippines, often used to represent the "Filipino everyman". He is usually depicted wearing the native salakot hat, barong tagalog, long pants, and tsinelas (local term for the popular flip-flops).

== History ==
Juan dela Cruz was invented by Robert McCulloch-Dick, the editor and publisher of Philippines Free Press, founded in 1908. He noticed the frequency with which the names appeared on police blotters and court dockets. He was also notified that the Philippine Catholic Church baptized a large number of children, giving them names of popular saints. He often wrote small verses about Juan dela Cruz in Free Press, and narrations of the petty crimes committed by them.

Later on, McCulloch-Dick widened his idea until he made Juan dela Cruz a character representative of a typical Filipino. Juan dela Cruz is associated with the image of a naïve-looking man wearing a salakot, camisa de chino, native trousers, and slippers. Jorge Pineda, resident cartoonist of Free Press, first drew the image of Juan in 1946.

== Usage ==
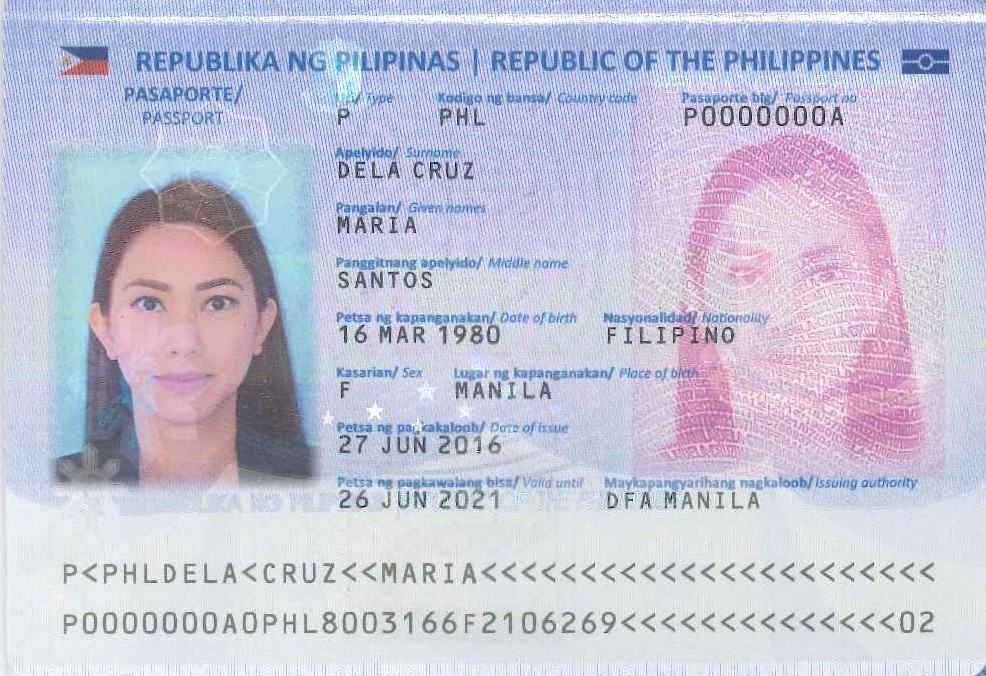
An official sample of a Philippine passport with "Maria dela Cruz" as the fictitious placeholder owner of the document.

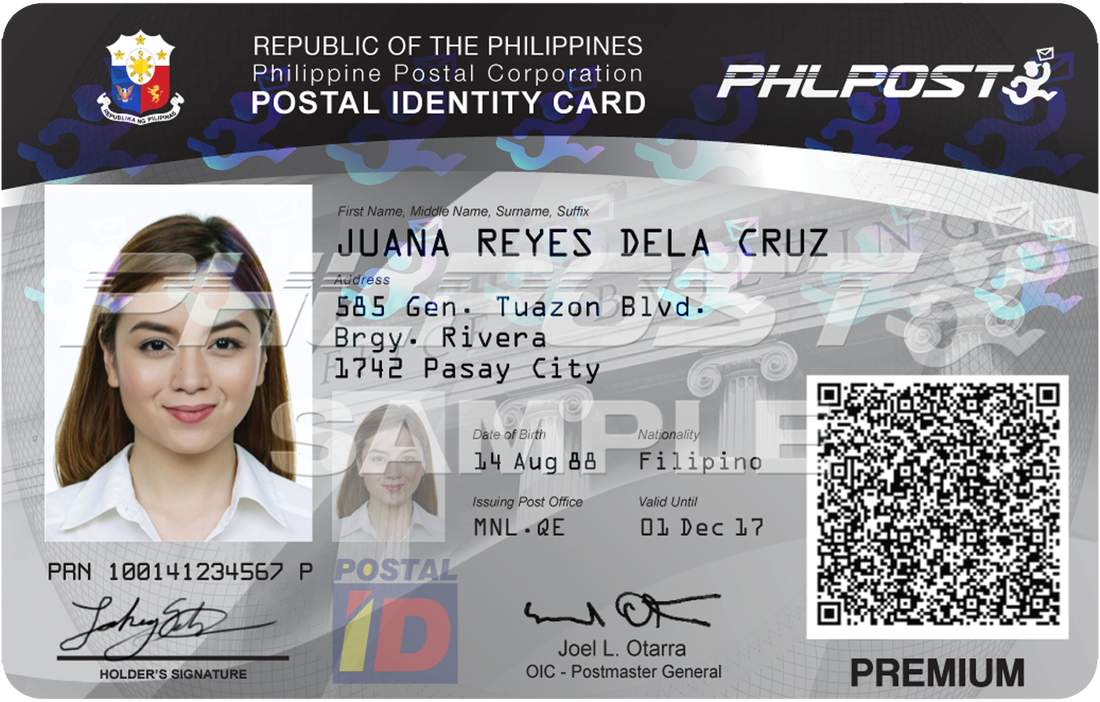
An official sample of a PhilPost ID with "Juana Reyes Dela Cruz" as the fictitious placeholder owner of the document.

Activists often portray Juan dela Cruz as a victim of American imperialism, especially since many editorial cartoons of the American period often depicted him alongside Uncle Sam either as a "Little Brown Brother" or as an Asian Partner. In modern times, he is shown independently as a venue for the common Filipino's commentary on governmental and social issues.

The term, sometimes shortened to "Juan", also refers to the collective Filipino psyche.

The name (Spanish for "John of the Cross") is often used as a placeholder name for an anonymous individual, roughly the equivalent of the American John Doe. The feminine placeholder is usually María dela Cruz, which like Juan is a common first name among Filipino women, though Juana dela Cruz is currently gaining popularity in Philippine television and especially in political campaigns by President Bongbong Marcos.

=== Music ===
A popular Filipino hard rock band active in the 1970s took its name from the character.

=== Theater ===
"Ang mga Kagikagilalas na Pakikipagsapalaran ni Juan Dela Cruz" (1975) is a "dula-tula" (play-poem) by Emmanuel Lacaba that is performed during the Martial law under Ferdinand Marcos.

== See also ==
- Juan Tamad, or "Lazy John" – another character common in Filipino culture and literature.
- María Clara, from the novel Noli Me Tángere by national hero José Rizal, refers to the idealised Filipina (analogous to the Japanese Yamato nadeshiko).
