= Ipaglaban Mo: The Movie =

1995 legal drama film by Marilou Diaz-Abaya

Ipaglaban Mo!: The Movie
- Official movie poster
- Directed by: Marilou Diaz-Abaya
- Written by: Ricardo Lee
- Based on: Ipaglaban Mo! by ABS-CBN Entertainment
- Produced by: Simon C. Ongpin
- Starring: Atty. Jose C. Sison; Sharmaine Arnaiz; Chin Chin Gutierrez; Ronaldo Valdez; Elizabeth Oropesa; Nida Blanca; Joel Torre; Ricky Davao; Gina Alajar
- Narrated by: Atty. Jose C. Sison
- Cinematography: Eduardo Jacinto
- Edited by: Jess Navarro
- Music by: Nonong Buencamino
- Production company: Star Cinema
- Distributed by: Star Cinema
- Release date: March 29, 1995
- Running time: 135 minutes
- Country: Philippines
- Language: Filipino

Ipaglaban Mo: The Movie (promoted as Kapag May Katwiran... Ipaglaban Mo!: The Movie), also known to its international title Redeem Her Honor, is a 1995 Philippine legal drama anthology film directed by Marilou Diaz-Abaya from a screenplay by Ricky Lee. It is the film adaptation of the legal drama Kapag May Katwiran... Ipaglaban Mo!, aired on ABS-CBN. Presented and narrated by Atty. Jose C. Sison, the presenter of the mentioned television program, the film is divided into two separate segments, both tackling real-life criminal cases of rape. The first segment stars Sharmaine Arnaiz, Nida Blanca, Elizabeth Oropesa and Ronaldo Valdez, while the second and last segment stars Chin Chin Gutierrez, Gina Alajar, Ricky Davao and Joel Torre.

Produced and distributed by Star Cinema, it was theatrically released on March 29, 1995, and it became a box-office success. It also premiered in Japan on September 14, 1995, as one of the film titles exhibited under the Excellent Films of Asia section for the 5th Fukuoka International Film Festival. Davao won two accolades for Best Supporting Actor at the Gawad Urian and FAP Awards.

A sequel, Ipaglaban Mo: The Movie II, was released in 1997. In 2018, the film was digitally restored and remastered by ABS-CBN Film Restoration and Central Digital Lab, and was released on KTX.ph on March 17, 2022, as part of the commemoration of Ricky Lee's contributions to Philippine cinema.

== Plot ==
Atty. Jose C. Sison presents two separate cases of rape in the court: one is about qualified seduction, committed by Rosendo de Castro to her niece by marriage, and one case of rape, committed by Alan Delos Santos to his ex-girlfriend who is already married.

=== Qualified Seduction: Case No. 23450 ===
Maria Saldaga was just a 17-year-old girl when she was sent by her mother, Feliza, to work as a house helper at the house of her maternal uncle-in-law, Rosendo de Castro, and his wife Magdalena, to pay off the debts that her deceased father left behind. She was accepted by her aunt and uncle-in-law. Rosendo was struck by his niece's beauty when she was doing the laundry at the riverbank. Later at night, while his wife Magdalena is sleeping, Rosendo sneaks into the room and begins seducing Maria, who begins to feel startled and horrified by her uncle's immoral act. She tries to escape the room but never succeeds as the seduction continues. On the following day, Maria attempts to leave the house, but Rosendo forbids her and bribes her with amounts of money. Every time, without being suspected by Rosendo's wife, Rosendo continues to do indecent acts to Maria, and it lasts for two months.

One day, while Maria is preparing the table, Rosendo seduces her again, and Maria begs him to stop. Moments later, Magdalena heard the noises, and she caught her husband seducing Maria. Rather than blaming her husband, she blames and hurts her niece for doing an act that disgusts her, leaving Rosendo to witness them remorselessly. Because of this, Magdalena grabs and cuts Maria's hair violently and then expels her out of their house. On the same day at night, Feliza discovers her daughter and notices her hair being cut. Later on, Feliza began threatening them violently because Maria told her mother that she was seduced and raped by Rosendo, whom she called an "animal" for the thing he had done to her daughter.

On the following morning, Maria and Feliza went to the town's police station to report the crime against Rosendo and later gained a lawyer who would handle the case against him. The lawyer said that the case would be stronger if Rosendo committed "qualified seduction", which is an act where an offender commits sexual intercourse with a minor by abusing the power of the elder or the higher, even if she agreed. Later on, Rosendo receives a subpoena. Knowing that her sister filed a case against Rosendo, Magdalena assures her husband that they will win this battle.

In court, testimonies began to be told, including the discovery by Dr. Ramon Layug, the medical examiner, that Maria sustained numerous hymenal lacerations as a result of Rosendo's numerous times of seduction and rape, and Maria demonstrated how she was seduced and raped by Rosendo. When Rosendo, Magdalena, the mayor, and others arrive at Feliza's house, Rosendo gives the money to stop their hostility, with the help of the mayor. Feliza accepts it but only to be thrown in the burning stove, further angering Rosendo. The court battle between them became an embarrassment for them by the townsfolk. At the despedida party, Rosendo and Magdalena are among the guests who attend when Maria and Feliza show up. On that same occasion, Feliza exposes the dirty crime of Rosendo to every guest of the party and calls her sister a "hypocrite" for siding with her husband over her blood relative. Feliza assures that she and her daughter will win the case.

At the court, the arraignment continued as Maria and Feliza's lawyer asked Rosendo how Maria became a house helper at their house, how much debt her family owed him, how much of Feliza's salary was being deducted, and so on, much to Rosendo's lawyer's annoyance. Later on, when Maria and Feliza's lawyer asks Rosendo if he is responsible for Maria being a house helper and seducing her because he mentioned the word "responsibility" in his preceding statements, Rosendo admits his responsibility. Because of this, his confession to the court left him dumbfounded and in shame for his actions.

Rosendo de Castro, who pleaded not guilty to the crime of qualified seduction filed by Maria and Feliza, was found guilty by the court. He was sentenced to six years in prison and fined 20,000 pesos worth of damages to the family of Maria. The part ends with Maria and Feliza overjoyed by the decision of the court against Rosendo.

=== Rape: Case No. 538832 ===
Gilda Cuevas is a high school teacher who is currently engaged to Daniel, a manager of a rural bank. However, when she left her workplace, she was followed by her ex-lover, Alan Delos Santos.

On December 18, 1990, Alan had an accident when he was hit by a tricycle. Gilda decided to help him and went to a restaurant. While away, Alam secretly poured a drug into her drink. On the same night, while Gilda was unconscious due to the effects of the drug poured into her drink by Alan, he raped her. She decided to file a case against Alan with the help of Gilda's lawyer friend Lilia. As a result of the rape, she became pregnant, and she admitted to her husband about it. The case took a year until Gilda gave birth. Despite being a result of rape, Daniel treated the child as his own.

When Alan learned that Gilda had given birth, he begged to let him see the child, and he would give him financial support. However, Gilda refused to let him see the child. Daniel came and told him not to meddle with his wife. The two got enraged in a fist fight. Gilda decided to meet with Alan secretly. He asked to let him see his child and withdraw the case against him. When Alan took the witness stand, Lilia showed him a foil wrapper of the drug that he used to put Gilda unconscious. Alan said that he bought aspirin because of a headache as a result of the accident. She told him that the drug is not being sold over-the-counter and she also said someone saw him at a drugstore. Lilia also showed the prescription for the drug. When asked if he loves Gilda and answered yes, but Lilia doesn't believe him and told him that if he really loves her, he will not let Gilda marry Daniel. And when she asked if Alan put drugs in Gilda's drink, he admitted it. He said that he did it out of anger, and told the court that he's a more deserving man than Daniel.

Alan Delos Santos, who pleaded not guilty to the accusations of the crime of rape filed by Gilda, was found guilty by the court. He was sentenced to imprisonment. The court also denied Alan's motion to recognize him as the father of Gilda's son. After the case, Gilda and Daniel decided to leave.

Five years later, Gilda visited Alan in prison. She then introduced her son to him and forgave him. They left the prison with Daniel as a happy family.

== Cast ==
Besides Atty. Jose C. Sison, actor Cris Daluz appeared in both segments as the court judge.

=== Qualified Seduction: Case No. 23450 ===
- Sharmaine Arnaiz as Maria Saldaga
- Nida Blanca as Magdalena de Castro
- Elizabeth Oropesa as Feliza Saldago
- Ronaldo Valdez as Rosendo de Castro
- Gamaliel Viray as Maria and Feliza's lawyer
- Tony Mabesa as Rosendo's lawyer
- Archie Adamos (uncredited) as Dr. Ramon Layug

=== Rape: Case No. 538832 ===
- Chin Chin Gutierrez as Gilda Cuevas
- Gina Alajar as Atty. Lilia Manalang
- Ricky Davao as Alan de los Santos
- Joel Torre as Daniel
- Lucita Soriano
- Subas Herrero as Alan's lawyer
- Romeo Rivera
- Ernie Zarate

== Production ==
After film and television director Marilou Diaz-Abaya finished directing Ang Ika-Labing Isang Utos: Mahalin Mo, Asawa Mo in 1994, Charo Santos-Concio, the executive producer of Star Cinema and one of the programming heads of ABS-CBN, asked the director if she had seen Kapag May Katwiran... Ipaglaban Mo!, a legal drama that dramatizes real-life criminal cases, and if she wanted to direct the film version of the show. The director accepted the offer because she had seen the show. Later on, she and Ricky Lee, her screenwriting collaborator, chose two legal cases where women were abused. This film project would later become part of Marilou Diaz-Abaya's string of films that advocated for the rights of women.

== Release ==
Redeem Her Honor was released in Philippine theaters by Star Cinema on March 29, 1995.

== Reception ==
=== Accolades ===
Ricky Davao, who played Alan in the "Rape" segment, won his first award at the Gawad Urian Awards for Best Supporting Actor.
