= Momay =

2010 Philippine television drama series

- Title card
- Genre: Comedy; Drama; Fantasy; Romance; Christian drama
- Created by: ABS-CBN Studios; Elena M. Patron
- Directed by: Darnel Joy R. Villaflor; Manny Q. Palo; Jojo A. Saguin
- Starring: Xyriel Manabat; Maliksi Morales; Ejay Falcon; Lorna Tolentino; Glydel Mercado; Tyron Perez; Queenie Padilla
- Theme music composer: Francis Concio
- Opening theme: "Nandito Lang Ako" by Fatima Soriano
- Country of origin: Philippines
- Original languages: Filipino; Cebuano; Bicolano
- No. of episodes: 85 (list of episodes)

Production
- Executive producers: Roldeo T. Endrinal; Eileen Angela T. Garcia
- Running time: 30-33 minutes
- Production company: Dreamscape Entertainment

Original release
- Network: ABS-CBN
- Release: May 24 – September 17, 2010

Related
- Mga Anghel na Walang Langit; May Bukas Pa; Agua Bendita; 100 Days to Heaven; Dahil sa Pag-ibig; Nathaniel; Huwag Kang Mangamba; Love in 40 Days

Momay is a 2010 Philippine television drama series broadcast by ABS-CBN. Directed by Darnel Joy R. Villaflor, Manny Q. Palo, and Jojo A. Saguin, it stars Xyriel Manabat, Maliksi Morales, Ejay Falcon, Lorna Tolentino, Glydel Mercado, Tyron Perez, and Queenie Padilla. It aired on the network's Primetime Bida lineup and worldwide on TFC from May 24 to September 17, 2010, replacing Tanging Yaman and was replaced by Kokey at Ako.

The story revolves around a little girl who has died and come back as a ghost to protect and guard her family. She persists in her presence while dealing with unfinished business surrounding her family and relatives.

== Overview ==
The show has been developed by Mga Anghel na Walang Langit, Princess Sarah, May Bukas Pa, and Agua Bendita due to genre of family, religious, and child-oriented drama series where Dreamscape Entertainment released these types of series since 2005. Momay aired from May 24 to September 17, 2010 where it co-existed with Agua Bendita from May 24 to September 3, 2010 and the former's successor Noah from July 12 to September 17, 2010. It was succeeded by Noah. Momay is the third and final of the one-year trilogy of ABS-CBN religious series that were released from February 2, 2009 to September 17, 2010 after May Bukas Pa and Agua Bendita.

Year	Episode numbers	No. of episodes	First aired	Last aired
2010	1–85	85	May 24, 2010	September 17, 2010

== Plot ==
Miley, also known to her family as Momay, was the daughter of the owners of an amusement park named "La Vida Funland". Her father had died from a brain tumor, forcing her mother Shirley to become independent for the children. As Shirley manages the carnival, she encountered some problems, such as an accident in which one of her employees died. The husband of this employee then stormed their house and set it on fire, which accidentally made Momay comatose. The husband remained pleading not guilty for the fire. After Hillary, Momay's aunt who had a fixation with taking over the La Vida Funland business, turns off Momay's life support machine resulting in her death, Shirley's depression managed to get the better of her, as she disappears from thin air leaving Justin in the care of Hillary.

As Momay passed into purgatory, she pleaded to return to Earth, to wrap up all the loose ends in her life. Still in a form and a mind of a child, she returns to Earth, not knowing fifteen years have passed since her death. She then meets a cowardly little boy named Andrew. They became best friends as Andrew tries to help Momay find her family and restore peace and order in it.

== Cast and characters ==
=== Main cast ===
- Xyriel Manabat as Miley "Mommy Miley/Momay" Buenavidez (February 22, 1988 - May 24, 1995) - a young girl who is very caring to JJ (Jappy Mercado), her younger adoptive brother. Unfortunately, Momay became comatose due to an accident when she tried to save Justin from their burning house. Seeing no hope in Miley awakening, and in an intent to spite Shirley, Hillary decided to cut off her life support machine (respirator) for being brain dead, resulting in her death. However, after reaching the afterlife, Momay decided to come back to her family without realizing that it has been 15 years since her death, although she is still in a form of a child. Momay, as a ghost, looked after her family and sometimes took over another person's body to communicate with them. The only way Momay can take over a body is if she merges at the exact moment the person dies and the spirit leaves the body, and later on, Momay has possessed two bodies that she has merged with (Libra Monte and Dra. Judy). Having fulfilled her mission, she goes back to heaven in the final episode.
- Maliksi Morales as Andrew "Andro" Corpuz - a cowardly little boy who, after accidentally bumping his head, gained the ability to see ghosts. He has been friends with Momay after entering the burnt house. He helped Momay find her mom. After Momay finds the key of La Vida Funland in a picture of her family, Andro takes it with him to La Vida Funland and Hillary sees and they were grabbing it near the stairs and Hillary lets go, even Andro falls down and is sent to the hospital for an operation, he emerges as a ghost and returns to his real body in time to avoid a permanent death. Momay played with him for the last time, and like with her family members, he cries at the end when Momay goes back to heaven.
- Ejay Falcon as Justin "JJ" Buenavidez - Momay's younger adoptive brother. Later in the story, he is revealed to be the biological son of Mickey & Gary's half-brother. After returning from the afterlife, JJ is all grown-up while Momay is still in a form of a child. JJ lived with his aunt Hillary who most of the time abuses him. Since he is set to inherit La Vida Funland, his aunt Hillary uses and controls him. Justin, Mickey & Momay (Xyriel Manabat) go to Bicol and find out. He is Alyssa's boyfriend. Though he is the younger brother, he still tells Momay what she should be doing as if he is the older sibling.
- Lorna Tolentino as Shirley Buenavidez - Momay's beloved mother. She and her husband owns a carnival which was popularly known as "La Vida Funland". After Miley (Momay) died, Shirley ran away and was never seen again, she left JJ (her adoptive son) in the care of Hillary. Mickey (Lito Pimentel) learns that a person named Shirley Buenavidez is critical after a bus accident that took place in Bicol. Her death in the accident proved to be false. Hillary took measures to keep Justin from knowing her survival or whereabouts. She suffered from temporary insanity which Hillary took advantage of, which she soon used as a front to attempt an escape. Hillary was nearly successful in eliminating her, but Momay's intervention saved her.
- Glydel Mercado as Hillary Buenavidez-Alonzo - Donnie's younger sister and Momay's cruel aunt. Hillary's parents adopted Donnie and gave him the Playland. Hillary thinks she deserves it because she is the real daughter and Donnie is the adopted son. Hillary caused Momay's death after turning off the respirator. She is La Vida Funland's manager and is always after the business as she is jealous that it was owned by her adopted brother. She is capable of cruel, dastardly or deceitful acts for the sake of her interests, such as staging a mugging, falsely accusing JJ and wielding a completely undesirable attitude. After finding out that JJ is a son of Mickey from another woman, she grew to hate JJ and wanted him dead, and after Shirley regains her sanity, Hillary wanted her dead as well. She staged a scheme to eliminate both JJ and Shirley, and also destroy the la vida funland, however, in the end, the police shoots her in self-defense, after injuring Gary. She realized to her horror that she was killed; to make things worse, she was grabbed by a fiery hand afterwards, to eternal punishment, with only a scared Momay standing witness as her aunt is sent to hell to suffer for eternity as punishment for her actions.
- Tyron Perez† as Gary Alonzo - Momay's cousin and Justin's brother who is always jealous towards them, he is also Hillary and Mickey's only child. He normally hates Justin because he can't seem to outshine him although he does everything that he can. Actually, He's Justin's half-brother (both are Mickey's sons). He was injured from a car accident, but wanted to protect his mother. In the end, he and Justin make peace in front of the urn of Hillary.
- Queenie Padilla as Alyssa Ocampo - After her mother died, she was left with her dad whom most of the time isn't present with her. She was most of the time left in the care of her fortune teller aunt in La Vida Funland. Her aunt also mentioned that she will meet the man of her dreams. It was later revealed that this man is Justin whom she met on extraordinary measures. After her fortune teller aunt, she inherited the fortune telling place in La Vida Funland. She is Raven's younger sister and Justin's girlfriend. Her real name in the show is Kate Lorenzo. Initially she was used by Raven and her father in a scheme to destroy the La Vida Funland, but after being injured, she was able to see ghosts like Momay. She turns her father in to the police, and atoned to Justin for the deception she took part in.

=== Supporting cast ===
- Lito Pimentel as Mickey Alonzo - Gary's father and Hillary's husband. Opposite from his wife, he is kind and understanding. He is the engineer of the rides on La Vida Funland. He cares a lot for JJ, always standing up for him when Hillary does something wrong, which caused their only son, Gary, to feel jealous. Actually, He's a biological father of JJ.
- Pinky Amador as Molly Corpuz - Andro's mother. She is a gambler and owns an illegal gambling place at their house. She only thinks about money causing their son Andrew to feel left out. She left Andro, Britney and their father, fearing that she might get caught by the police. She later realized the error of her ways and returned to their home to accompany her injured son, Andro.
- Allan Paule as Fred Corpuz - Andro's father. He works at a jeepney station. He is always drunk and also only thinks about money. He starts to warm up to his children ever since his son complained about their life to him. Same happened with their mother, who has left him for a while.
- Eda Nolan as Britney Corpuz - Andro's older sister. She is a spoiled brat when it comes to her mom, she always asks for valuable although unimportant items. She had a huge crush for Gary after bumping into him at La Vida Funland. Despite being mean to her younger brother Andro, she actually loves and cares for him very much. This is shown when she cries, thinking that her brother is going to die.
- Bettina Carlos as Raven Ocampo - the publicity and promotion head for La Vida Funland. She grows envious of Alyssa after being a favourite of Hillary. She is Alyssa's older sister. Her real name in the show is Mary Lorenzo. She plans to ruin JJ's family with a help from her sister called Alyssa/Kate Lorenzo. She loves her sister very much and admits that she and her father blew up La Vida Funland in the final episode. Although she gets jailed because of blowing up La Vida Funland, she's still happy that she gets to see her sister.
- William Lorenzo as Joel Ocampo - the husband of one of La Vida Funland's employee. He seeks revenge to the Buenavidez family over the death of his wife. Because of his grudge to the family, he was the arson who killed Momay for revenge. He got jailed in with his daughter, Mary for trying to kill Hillary and Shirley and making La Vida Funland explode.

=== Extended cast ===
- Matet de Leon as Rose - the spirit who picked up Miley from Earth to walk her into heaven. She also served as Miley's mentor and guide at life of being a spirit.
- Ogie Diaz as Mando - a ghost exorcist Hillary hired to remove the said ghosts she believes that roams around La Vida Funland.
- Basty Alcances as Raul - a bully who has been bullying Andro.
- Sharlene San Pedro as Lindsay - the daughter of Alyssa's family maid.
- Ketchup Eusebio as Mack - Justin's friend and co-worker in La Vida Funland. He works as a moving statue.
- Isay Alvarez as Dra. Judy Villegas - Hired by Hillary to keep Shirley in the dark under the guise of a somewhat false diagnosis of clinical insanity. She meets a seemingly-fatal accident that led her to become Momay's 2nd body host. Using Judy's body, Momay attempts to lead her mother away from Hillary's custody.

=== Special participation ===
- Joel Torre as Donato "Donnie" Buenavidez - Momay's father who owns La Vida Funland. He is Hillary's adopted brother. Donnie had a brain tumor which caused his death. He is the one who picked up Momay to go back to heaven, not Rose the angel.
- Valerie Concepcion as Libra Monte - a stripper in a club. She became Momay's very first hostess after Alyssa suggested that ghosts can actually enter the body of living people. She got shot after running away from a group of kidnappers. She apparently died due to the gunshot wound causing her spirit to leave the body and allowing Momay to take over.
- Jappy Mercado as Young Justin
- Quintin Alianza as Young Gary
- Phebe Kay Arbotante as Young Sophia/Raven
- Mon Confiado as Boss Chief Manuel
- Greggy Santos as Charlie
- Miles Ocampo as Mina
- Mara Lopez as Stephanie
- Tiya Pusit as Aling Linda
- Pocholo Montes as Mang Ruben
- Alicia Alonzo as Lola Conchita
- Michael Conan as Leon
- Rustica Carpio as Inkang Tale/Lola Natalie
- Jayson Barraquio as classmate
- Martina Wassertheurer as Monica Sy
- Elisia Parmisano as Danica Sy
- Ara Mina as Rao Sy
- Kim Chiu as Fao Sy
- Rowell Santiago as Aspin Sy

== Overview ==
=== Comics ===
Momay was a Philippine comics novel created by Elena M. Patron. It was adapted for television through the series, Komiks.

=== Komiks adaptation ===
Serialized on Komiks, which was first aired in 2006 during its 2nd season.

==== Komiks version cast ====
- Maja Salvador as Molly May "Momay" Santos
- Patrick Garcia as Andro
- Gloria Romero as Ana
- Justin Cuyugan
- Jenny Hernandez

== Reception ==
=== Launch ===
Momay was launched as one of the ABS-CBN's offerings for the 2010 launched during the ABS-CBN Trade Launch and announced during the Kapamilya Trade Launch held in Boracay. The launch is done as a part of ABS-CBN's celebration for the 60th Anniversary of Philippine Soap Opera.

== See also ==
- List of programs broadcast by ABS-CBN
