= Ipaglaban Mo! =

Philippine public service and advocacy-driven legal drama anthology television program

- Title card of the 2014 edition
- Also known as: Kapag nasa Katwiran, Ipaglaban Mo!; Kapag May Katwiran, Ipaglaban Mo!; Kapag May Katuwiran, Ipaglaban Mo!
- Genre: Legal drama; Crime; Anthology
- Developed by: ABS-CBN Studios
- Written by: Various
- Directed by: Nick Lizaso (1988–1999) various directors
- Presented by: Atty. Jose C. Sison; Jopet S. Sison
- Opening theme: "Ipaglalaban Ko" by Freddie Aguilar (1988); "Ipaglaban Mo!" by April Boy Regino (1999); "Ipaglaban Mo!" by Gloc-9 and KZ Tandingan (2014)
- Country of origin: Philippines
- Original language: Tagalog
- No. of episodes: IBC: N/A; ABS-CBN: 274; (list of episodes)

Production
- Executive producers: Carlo L. Katigbak; Cory Vidanes; Laurenti Dyogi; Ruel S. Bayani
- Producer: Edyl Macy Delos Santos
- Camera setup: Multiple-camera setup
- Running time: 44–50 minutes 60 minutes (2020–2024)
- Production companies: Nova Enterprises Production International (1988–1992); Milliard Productions (1992–1999); Legacy Multi-media Productions, Inc (1999-2000); RSB Unit (2014–2020); RGE Unit (2019–2020)

Original release
- Network: IBC/Islands TV 13
- Release: June 13, 1988 – August 14, 1992 (first iteration)
- Network: ABS-CBN
- Release: August 16, 1992 – March 7, 1999 (first iteration)
- Network: RPN
- Release: March 20, 1999 – 2000 (replay of first iteration)
- Network: ABS-CBN
- Release: February 7, 2004 – 2005 (replay of first iteration)
- Network: Kapamilya Channel
- Release: June 7, 2014 – May 2, 2020 (second iteration)
- Release: June 14 – July 5, 2020 (second iteration)

Related
- Ikaw at ang Batas; Kapag nasa Katwiran, Ipaglaban Mo!

Ipaglaban Mo! (transl. Fight for It!), also known as Kapag nasa Katwiran, Ipaglaban Mo!, Kapag May Katwiran... Ipaglaban Mo! or Kapag May Katuwiran, Ipaglaban Mo!, is a Philippine television public service and advocacy-driven legal drama anthology show broadcast by IBC/Islands TV 13, ABS-CBN, RPN, GMA News TV and Kapamilya Channel under ABS-CBN Studios, featuring dramatizations of actual cases brought and settled in the Supreme Court and Court of Appeals of the Philippines. It aired from June 13, 1988 to 2000. The show returned from February 7, 2004 to 2005 and again from June 7, 2014 to July 5, 2020.

== Hosts ==
- Jose Sison, a lawyer (1988–2000; 2004–2005; 2012–2013; 2014–2020; election leave from January until May 31, 2019)
- Jopet Sison, Jose's son (2004–2005; 2012–2013; 2014–2020)

== History ==
=== 1988–2005: Original run ===
Kapag nasa Katwiran, Ipaglaban Mo! was originally aired over IBC on June 13, 1988, and last aired on August 14, 1992. The program transferred to ABS-CBN on August 16, 1992, under Milliard Productions as a blocktime program under the title Kapag May Katwiran, Ipaglaban Mo!. After 52 episodes, the show "premiered" in September 1993 as a station produced program and ended on March 7, 1999, being replaced by Tabing Ilog on its Sunday timeslot.

This past episodes (1993–1999) is currently streaming on Jeepney TV YouTube channel every 1st quarter of the month, together with Star Drama Theater every 5:00 pm.

From March 20, 1999 to 2000 and returned from February 7, 2004 to 2005, the show aired on RPN under the title Kapag nasa Katwiran, Ipaglaban Mo!, but in a unique setup. Some of the IBC-era episodes were re-aired with new taped segments replacing the original ones to make it look more timely and relevant.

=== 2012–2014: GMA News TV ===
Ipaglaban Mo!
- Title card
- Also known as: Kapag nasa Katwiran, Ipaglaban Mo!
- Genre: Legal drama
- Written by: Christian Vidallo; Raymund Dimayuga
- Directed by: Dante Nico Garcia
- Presented by: Atty. Jose C. Sison; Jopet Sison
- Country of origin: Philippines
- Original language: Tagalog (Filipino)
- No. of episodes: 13

Production
- Executive producer: Angelina Samson-Valvieja
- Producers: Paolo R. Leaño; Louanda D. Lomibao; Oliver Valvieja
- Cinematography: Rain Yamson II
- Editor: Laser Diaz
- Production companies: Bigtop Entertainment Inc.; Ipaglaban Mo Foundation

Original release
- Network: GMA News TV
- Release: November 10, 2012 – June 16, 2013

A new series of Kapag nasa Katwiran, Ipaglaban Mo! (transl. If it is Right ... Fight for it!) was broadcast by GMA News TV (now GTV), premiering on November 10, 2012. It was hosted by Jose C. Sison and Jopet Sison. On June 16, 2013, the show returned for a 3rd season.

=== 2014–2020: ABS-CBN/2020–2024: Kapamilya Channel/A2Z/All TV ===
Fifteen years after the show ended on ABS-CBN, the legal drama returned on June 7, 2014, as part of the Yes Weekend! block, airing every Saturday at 3 pm to 4 pm (later moved to 2:30 pm to 3:30 pm, 2:45 pm to 3:45 pm and back at 3 pm to 4 pm in 2015–2017 and 3:15 pm to 4:15 pm in 2017–2018, 4:30 pm to 5:30 pm in 2018 and 3:15 pm to 4:30 pm in 2018–2020) while the replay was every Wednesday at 2:00 pm, and every Thursday at 1:00 am, on DZMM TeleRadyo from April 19, 2017 to April 14, 2020. The show is still hosted by lawyer Jose Sison, together with his son Jopet Sison. It is simply called Ipaglaban Mo!.

On March 21, 2020, the show temporarily ceased production of new episodes due to the 2020 Luzon enhanced community quarantine, thereby halting the scheduled airing of new episodes. Re-runs of previous episodes were re-aired for the time being.

Following the shutdown of ABS-CBN broadcasting due to the cease-and-desist ordered by the National Telecommunications Commission (NTC) due to its franchise expiration, the show returned on the newly established Kapamilya Channel on June 14, 2020 at 2:30 pm to 3:30 pm (later moved to 2 pm to 3:15 pm) with new episodes aired but later on, it reverted to past episodes due to the COVID-19 pandemic in the Philippines and the Philippine Congress denied the new ABS-CBN legislative franchise to operate. It aired its last episode on July 5, 2020, resulting in the replacement of replay episodes between July 19, 2020, and the conclusion of this program, and it aired random past episodes on TeleRadyo from June 24, 2020 to May 9, 2021, and every Sunday at 4:00 pm and simulcasts on A2Z on July 4, 2021 until the program's conclusion.

On November 5, 2023, the show continued to air on Kapamilya Channel while the airing on A2Z was pre-empted to give way for 2023–24 PBA season until February 11, 2024 as a result of RPTV launched on February 1 (who carried the rest of the PBA season), thus resumed its airing on the latter network a week later.

The rerun ended on June 30, 2024, after a decade due to poor ratings and episode redundancies, and was replaced by the revival of Goin' Bulilit after almost 5 years of hiatus. A week later, it was swapped by My Puhunan: Kaya Mo! on its timeslot.

From April 21 to December 22, 2024, the show makes its brief return to channels 2 and 16 in Mega Manila and regional channels, previously held by ABS-CBN until 2020, when it was rerun on All TV as a simulcast with Jeepney TV. This occurred right after ABS-CBN Corporation and All TV's owner, Advanced Media Broadcasting System (AMBS), signed content agreements to air ABS-CBN programs on said channel. The show eventually did not go back on-air as Atty. Jose Sison passed away on July 23, 2026.

== Film adaptations ==
The series had two film adaptations. The first film, Ipaglaban Mo: The Movie, was released in 1995 with two stories starring Sharmaine Arnaiz and Chin-Chin Gutierrez in their first starring roles. Both stories depicted violence against women.

The second film, Ipaglaban Mo: The Movie II, was released in 1997 where it depicts poor people who want to seek justice. The first story features Carmina Villarroel as an illiterate maid who was accused of kidnapping her ward. But ended up being a victim of police brutality. The second story is about a man who vows to seek justice for the murder of his brother, whose suspects are from a powerful family.

== See also ==
- List of programs broadcast by ABS-CBN
- List of Kapamilya Channel original programming
- List of GTV (Philippine TV network) original programming
- List of programs previously broadcast by Radio Philippines Network
- List of programs broadcast by Intercontinental Broadcasting Corporation
