= Juan Tamad =

Character in Philippine folklore, often a stereotype of lazy youth

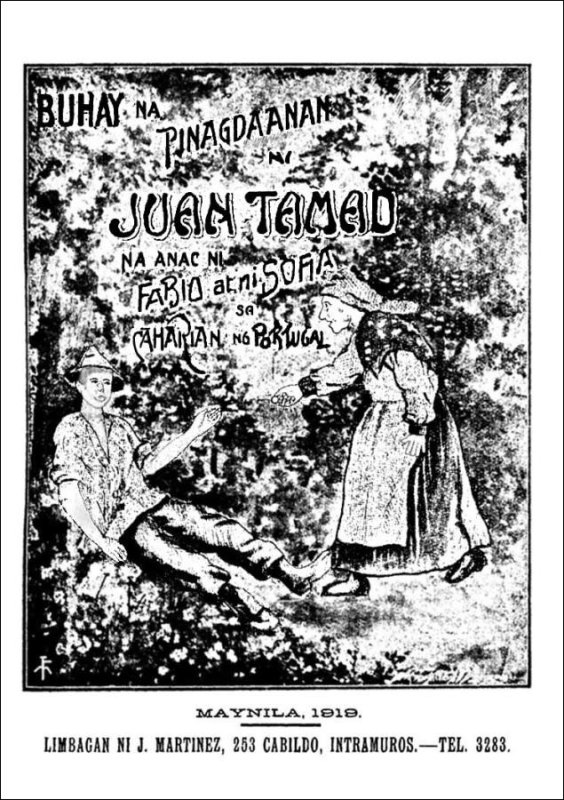
Buhay na Pinagdaanan ni Juan Tamad na Anac ni Fabio at ni Sofia sa Caharian nang Portugal, (Note: English: The life lived by Lazy John, son of Fabio and Sofia in the Kingdom of Portugal) published in 1919

Juan Tamad (Filipino for "Lazy John") is a character in Philippine folklore known for his laziness. He is usually portrayed as a child, although in some interpretations, he is said to be a young man.

== Stories ==
Arguably, the Juan Tamad story most often told illustrates his utmost laziness to the point of stupidity that it becomes comedic. In it, Juan Tamad comes upon a guava tree bearing ripe fruit. Being too slothful to climb the tree and take the fruit, he instead decides to lie beneath the tree and let gravity do its work. There he remained, waiting for the fruit to fall into his gaping mouth.

Other Juan Tamad stories include:

- '"Juan Tamad and the Mud Crabs"

Juan Tamad is instructed by his mother to purchase mud crabs at the market. Being too lazy to carry them home, he sets them free in a ditch and tells them to go on home, as he would be along later.

- "Juan Tamad and the Rice Cakes"

Juan Tamad's mother makes some rice cakes and instructs him to sell these at the market. Passing by a pond, he sees frogs swimming to and fro. Being too lazy to sell the cakes at the market, he instead throws them at the frogs, who eat the cakes. Upon reaching home, he tells his mother that all the cakes had been sold on credit; The buyers would pay for them the next week.

- "'Juan Tamad and the Flea-Killer'"

Juan Tamad's mother instructs him to go to the village market and buy a rice pot. A flea infestation in the village soon has Juan Tamad jumping and scratching; he lets go of the pot and it breaks into pieces. Thinking quickly, he picks up the pieces, grinds them into fine powder and wraps the powder in banana leaves, which he markets as "flea-killer."

- "Juan Tamad Takes a Bride"

Juan Tamad's mother tells him it is time he took a bride. He asks his mother what sort of woman he should look for. His mother replies, "a woman of a few words." Juan Tamad searches long and hard, but all the women he encounters seem to talk too much. Finally, he comes upon a house where an old woman and her daughter live. Upon seeing the girl, he proposes "Will you marry me?" The girl simply stares at him. He tells himself, "Ah, here is a woman of a few words," and lifts her up and takes her back to his mother. His mother chastises him, for he had brought back a corpse.

- "Juan Tamad's Burial"

Juan Tamad is mistakenly buried alive by monkeys.

== Books ==
A book published by an unknown author in 1919 in Manila entitled Buhay na Pinagdaanan ni Juan Tamad na Anac ni Fabio at ni Sofia sa Caharian nang Portugal (Tagalog for "The Life Lived by Juan Tamad, Son of Fabio and Sofia, in the Kingdom of Portugal") contains a poem consisting of 78 pages of four-line stanzas at seven stanzas per page. It tells of how Juan Tamad was born to a couple named Fabio and Sofia, and his adventures in Portugal.

In 1957, Manuel E. Arguilla (author of How My Brother Leon Brought Home a Wife) and Lyd Arguilla wrote the book Philippine Tales and Fables which included the story of Juan Tamad with illustrations by Romeo V. Tabuena. In 1965, playwright and publisher Alberto Florentino took the Arguillas' re-telling of Juan Tamad and published it as Stories of Juan Tamad, part of a series of 3 booklets for young readers. Illustrated with woodcuts by the late Jerry Navarro Elizalde (post-humously declared National Artist for Visual Arts), the book is out-of-print and is now considered a collector's item.

== Films ==
Several Filipino films have treated Juan Tamad as a central or supporting character.

- Si Juan Tamad , released in 1947 and directed by Manuel Conde.
- Juan Tamad Goes to Congress, released in 1960 and directed by Manuel Conde.
- Juan Tamad Junior released in 1980, features Niño Muhlach as Juan Tamad Jr. and Manuel Conde as Juan Tamad Sr.
- Juan Tamad at Mister Shooli sa Mongolian Barbecue, released in 1991, features director Manuel Urbano, Jr.'s television character Mr. Shooli and Eric Quizon as Juan Tamad.
- Juan Tamad, released in 1993, again bills Eric Quizon as Juan Tamad.

== Television ==
- GMA Network had also launched their newest comedy series, Juan Tamad with StarStruck alumni Sef Cadayona, Max Collins, RJ Padilla, Stephanie Sol, and more. The show premiered on August 23, 2015, as part of GMA 7's 65th anniversary celebrations.
- GMA's animated-fantasy series, Alamat starred Mike Tan, voicing the titular character, Louise delos Reyes, Maey Bautista and Love Añover.

== See also ==
- Juan de la Cruz
