= Juan Tamad at Mister Shooli: Mongolian Barbecue =

- Directed by: Jun Urbano
- Screenplay by: Jun Urbano; Ricky Lee
- Story by: Manuel Conde; Jun Urbano
- Produced by: Atty. Ed Flaminiano; Rose L. Flaminiano
- Starring: Jun Urbano; Eric Quizon
- Cinematography: Johnny Araojo
- Edited by: Efren Jarlego
- Music by: Mon del Rosario
- Production company: FLT Films
- Distributed by: FLT Films
- Release date: December 25, 1991
- Running time: 110 minutes
- Country: Philippines
- Language: Filipino

Juan Tamad at Mister Shooli: Mongolian Barbecue is a 1991 Filipino comedy film co-written and directed by Jun Urbano. The film stars Eric Quizon and Urbano as the titular Juan and Mister Shooli respectively. It is an official entry to the 1991 Metro Manila Film Festival.

A sequel, Ang M.O.N.A.Y. ni Mr. Shooli (Misteyks Opda Neysion Adres Yata), was released on March 21, 2007.

== Plot ==
Mr. Shooli, a Mongol, tells a story about one of his adventures to a group of children.

1,500 years before Cory, the land of Lawang-Lawa gains independence after its warriors defeat a combined occupation force composed of Spaniards, Americans and Japanese. As its citizens quarrel over how to govern themselves, Manhik Manaog proposes to establish an elected democracy, albeit with flawed definitions. At the marketplace, Shooli meets Juan Tamad, a lazy but good-hearted man, who helps him sell defective pots that lead to Shooli being chased and lynched by angry customers. Juan saves him and restores him back to health.

A group led by Kulas and claiming to be Juan's creditors show up at his house, demanding that he repay his debts by running for District Representative in upcoming elections for Congress, with Kulas as his adviser. Juan engages on a difficult but ultimately successful campaign against a wealthier and ruthless Manhik Manaog, who goes as far as hiring a Nazi to train his private army on how to intimidate voters and steal the election. At Juan's victory party, Manhik Manaog offers reconciliation, but plots with Kulas to control Juan. They convince him to do their bidding in Congress by making him act as an incompetent politician who promotes corruption, crime and red tape, despite warnings by Shooli and Juan's love interest, Manhik Manaog's daughter Zorayda. At the next electoral campaign, Juan is savagely beaten up by his constituents, but manages to recover and harangue them for how their personalistic expectations and demands on him as a politician forced him to engage in corrupt activities after he became mired in debt. As he ends his speech, a nearby volcano erupts, causing chaos as the story ends in a cliffhanger, with Shooli's audience being fetched by their parents.

After the children leave, Shooli discovers a girl left behind who demands to know the ending of the story, to which Shooli replies that only the people can write its ending, which the girl implores the audience through a fourth wall to do so. This is followed by an on-text manifesto by Jose Concepcion Jr.'s "Yes, the Filipino Can!" movement referring to the then-upcoming 1992 Philippine presidential election before the credits roll.

== Cast ==
- Jun Urbano as Mr. Shooli
- Eric Quizon as Juan Tamad
- Jackie Lou Blanco as Zorayda
- Leo Martinez as Manhik-Manaog
- Caridad Sanchez as Inay Litga
- Berting Labra as Gat Uto
- Lou Veloso as Kulas
- Shara Sanchez as Lea
- L.A. Lopez as Kulit
- Aiza Seguerra
- Dong Puno as himself
- Dencio Padilla as Emcee
- German Moreno as Kuya Germs
- Ramon Zamora as Gen. Volkswagen
- Philip Supnet as Kuhol

== Nominations ==
Year	Awards	Category	Recipient	Result	Ref.
1991	17th Metro Manila Film Festival	Best Film	Juan Tamad at Mister Shooli: Mongolian Barbecue	Nominated	
1991	17th Metro Manila Film Festival	Best Actor	Eric Quizon	Won	
1991	17th Metro Manila Film Festival	Supporting Actor	Leo Martinez	Won	
1991	17th Metro Manila Film Festival	Art Direction	Edel Templonuevo	Won	
1991	17th Metro Manila Film Festival	Best Cinematography	Johnny Arajo	Won	
1991	17th Metro Manila Film Festival	Best Sound Recording	Gaudencio Barredo	Won	
1991	17th Metro Manila Film Festival	Gatpuno Antonio J. Villegas Cultural Awards	Juan Tamad at Mister Shooli: Mongolian Barbecue	Won	
1992	41st FAMAS Awards	Best Supporting Actor	Leo Martinez	Nominated	
1992	41st FAMAS Awards	Best Child Actor	L.A. Lopez	Nominated	
1992	41st FAMAS Awards	Best Cinematography	Johnny Araojo	Won	
1992	10th FAP Awards	Best Cinematography	Johnny Araojo	Won	
1992	16th Gawad Urian Awards	Best Supporting Actor	Leo Martinez	Nominated	
