= Nanette Medved =

American philanthropist, businesswoman, and former actress

Nanette Gwen Medved
- Born: Nanette Gwen Medved; January 21, 1971 (age 55); Honolulu, Hawaii, United States
- Education: Babson College
- Occupation: Actress • Businesswoman • Philanthropist
- Known for: Darna (1991 film), Generation Hope
- Spouse: Christopher Po (m. 1999)
- Children: 2

Nanette Medved-Po is an American-born Russian-Chinese former actress, philanthropist, and businesswoman in the Philippines. She is best known for playing the titular role in the 1991 film Darna directed by Joel Lamangan.

== Career ==
In 2012, she established HOPE, a social enterprise that generates income by selling packaged water known as "Hope in a Bottle," "Hope in a Box", and "(Not Just) Tubig". 100% of its profits go towards building public school classrooms across the Philippines. As of 2025, 167 classrooms have been built and 25% of the locations are “last mile schools” where sourcing materials, logistics of reaching the remote build site, and navigating safety make project management challenging. It is the first B-Corporation certified company in the Philippines.

In 2014, she introduced the agriculture and livelihood initiative HOPE in a Coconut which empowers smallholder farmers in Mindanao through initiatives delivering high-quality farm inputs like seedlings, farm planning, training, market access, logistics support, and a pay-it-forward program. This not only provides 100% additional carbon sequestration to one of the countries worst hit by the climate crisis, but helps to guarantee a baseline income for the next 60 years to these smallholder farmer families of which 70% live below the poverty line.

As of 2025, they have reached approximately 33,504 farmers and planted over 2,216,790 free coconut tree seedlings.

In 2019, Medved founded PCX, a non-profit plastic responsibility platform. PCX was the first to establish an offsetting standard, the Plastic Pollution Reduction Standard, to safely process plastic waste and reduce the flow of plastic pollution into nature. She also introduced the Aling Tindera program, a 100% women microentrepreneur-run plastic waste-to-cash program that manages community collection stations. Collectly to date the PCX platform has enabled the collection and responsible processing of more than 200 million kilos of plastic waste.

From 2007 to 2012, Medved served on the advisory board of Bantay Bata. In 2012, she began to serve on the National Advisory Council of the World Wildlife Fund Philippines and in 2019, she was invited to serve on its board of trustees. In July 2019, she began serving as part of the Board of Directors of Winrock International. In 2023, she began serving on the board of Endeavor Philippines.

In 2017, she received the Forbes Heroes of Philanthropy Award. In 2022, she was named an Asia Gamechanger Climate Hero by The Asia Society and was also honored with the 2025 Impact Award for Humanity by Tatler for her transformative work in education and sustainability.

Prior to her philanthropic work, Medved had a career as a commercial model and actress. In 1996, she left the Philippines to pursue studies in the United States. In 2002, she decided to leave the entertainment industry to focus on her advocacy work.Since then, the only times that she has appeared on Philippine TV is to speak about her philanthropic projects.

== Personal life ==
Nanette Medved was born in Hawaii on January 21, 1971 to a Russian father and Chinese mother. She grew up traveling throughout Asia but spent most of her primary and secondary education in Holy Family Academy in Angeles City, Pampanga. She initially took courses in De La Salle–College of Saint Benilde in Manila and later opted to study abroad. She graduated Summa Cum Laude with degrees in Finance and Entrepreneurship from Babson College in Wellesley, Massachusetts in 1998. Medved married Christopher Po in South Africa in June 1999 and they have two children.

== Recognitions ==
Nanette Medved has received both local and international acclaim for her work in philanthropy and sustainability. In 2023, Hope and PCX were named among the world’s top 300 impact companies by the Real Leaders Impact Awards, alongside global brands such as Tesla, Ben & Jerry’s, and the Lego Group. That same year, she represented the Philippines at high-level global forums, including the United Nations Intergovernmental Negotiating Committee on Plastic Pollution in Paris, the World Trade Organization Public Forum in Geneva, the Forbes Sustainability Leaders Summit in New York, and The Economist Global Plastics Summit in Bangkok. She has also been consistently named among Asia’s Most Influential by Tatler Philippines from 2021 to 2024.

== Filmography ==
=== Film ===
- Eastwood and Bronson (1989)
- Bakit Ikaw Pa Rin? (1990)
- Sa Diyos Lang Ako Susuko (1990)
- Biktima (1990)
- Huwag Mong Salingin ang Sugat Ko (1991)
- Humanap Ka ng Panget (1991)
- Sa Kabila ng Lahat (1991)
- Hinukay Ko Na ang Libingan Mo! (1991)
- Andrew Ford Medina: 'Wag Kang Gamol! (1991)
- Darna (1991)
- Narito ang Puso Ko (1992)
- Hiram na Mukha (1992)
- Dito sa Pitong Gatang (1992)
- Dillinger (1992)
- Kapag May Gusot Walang Lusot (1993)
- Isang Bala Ka Lang Part 2 (1993)
- Tumbasan Mo ng Buhay (1993)
- An Lian Ni (1993)
- Iukit Mo sa Bala (1994)
- Hataw Tatay Hataw (1994)
- Pamilya Valderama (1995)
- Pag-ibig Ko sa Iyo'y Totoo (1997)
- Kasangga Mo Ako sa Huling Laban (1997)
- Goodbye America (1997)
- Ang Dalubhasa (2000)

=== Television ===
- Love Me Doods (1990)
- Cebu: Revisited (1993)
- Kate en Boogie (1993)
- Compañero y Compañera (2000–2001)
- Cinema Talk (2002)
