= Tyron Perez =

Filipino model, actor and television host (1984–2011)

- Born: Jojo Tyron Malonzo Perez; September 14, 1984; Concepcion, Tarlac, Philippines
- Died: December 29, 2011 (aged 27); Valenzuela, Philippines
- Resting place: Concepcion Japanese Cemetery, Concepcion, Tarlac
- Occupations: Actor; model
- Years active: 1999–2011

Jojo Tyron Malonzo Perez (September 14, 1984 – December 29, 2011) was a Filipino model, actor and television host and an alumnus of the reality-based talent search StarStruck.

== Early life ==
Perez was born in Brgy. Alfonso, Concepcion, Tarlac, Philippines. He grew up a farmer's son in his hometown, with the rice fields as his playground. He was the youngest among six children.

"He and his father would rise with the sun", said Tyron who quit his Fine Arts studies (freshman at the Bulacan State University) when he joined the GMA star-search StarStruck (first batch, with Mark Herras and Jennylyn Mercado). "There, on top of the carabao, he dreams to be in showbiz. He imagined himself acting with Kris Aquino, his crush and idol. Until he was in high school (at the Benigno Aquino National High School), he and his dad would milk their carabaos early mornings and sell the milk. Sometimes, they would sleep in the middle of the rice fields when we had to water the seedlings (nagpapatubig ng palay)." Before joining StarStruck, Perez first became a member of a late-night variety show of Kuya Germs' Master Showman Presents Walang Tulugan. As part of the said late-night show, he was a member of a teen group performing weekly called MSP Teenstars.

== Starstruck Batch 1 ==
Perez joined StarStruck in 2003 but was eliminated in week 6 of the competition.

== Personal life ==
After his manager's death (Douglas Quijano), Perez admitted that his career dwindled and he did not have work for 6 months. In June 2010, Jerry Sineneng led his entry into ABS-CBN and after talks with Malou Santos and Johnny Manahan, Perez had formally signed with the network's talent management arm, Star Magic. This officially made him a Kapamilya. He considered his role Being Gary as one of the biggest he had handled so far, and Momay as his biggest break in television. He also played a role in Bakekang on GMA Network. He married his long-time girlfriend.

== Death ==
Perez was found dead inside a car in Barangay Ugong, Valenzuela City on the night of December 29, 2011. His death was confirmed as suicide. He was buried in Concepcion Japanese Cemetery in Concepcion, Tarlac on January 5, 2012.

== Filmography ==
=== Film ===
Year	Title	Role	Notes
2003	Malikmata	Edward	First movie appearance
2005	Happily Ever After	Ogie	Lead actor
2006	Twilight Dancers	Dwight	Lead actor
2009	Pipo	Felix Pipo	Last movie appearance

Note: All of his movies are independent films.

=== Television ===
Year	Title	Role	Notes
2001–2002	Walang Tulugan with the Master Showman	Member, MSP Teenstars	Member of teen dance group, first TV appearance
2003	StarStruck	Himself/contestant	Finished at 8th place
2005	Baywalk	Himself	
2005	Kung Mamahalin Mo Lang Ako	Dominic	
2006	Carlo J. Caparas' Bakekang	Paolo	
2007	Kung Mahawi Man ang Ulap	Anastacio	
2007	Lupin	Agent X-J	Last project with GMA
2008	Midnight DJ: Bloody Christmas Tree	Mark	Only project with TV5
2010	Elena M. Patron's Momay	Gary Alonzo	First project with ABS-CBN
2010	Maalaala Mo Kaya: Larawan	Christian	
2010	Maalaala Mo Kaya: Marriage Contract	Guest actor	
2010	Imortal	Guest actor	
2011	Your Song Presents: Andi	Francis	Guest actor
2011	Mula sa Puso	Gilbert	
2011	Maalaala Mo Kaya: Baunan	Dino	Last TV appearance
