= Macho Dancer =

1988 film by Lino Brocka

- Movie Poster
- Directed by: Lino Brocka
- Written by: Amado Lacuesta Jr.; Ricardo Lee
- Produced by: Boy C. De Guia
- Starring: Daniel Fernando; Jaclyn Jose; Allan Paule; Princess Punzalan
- Cinematography: Joe Totanes
- Edited by: Ruben Natividad
- Music by: Mon del Rosario
- Production companies: Award Films; Special People Productions
- Distributed by: Viva Films
- Release date: September 9, 1988 (TIFF)
- Running time: 136 minutes
- Country: Philippines
- Language: Filipino

Macho Dancer is a 1988 Philippine drama film directed by Lino Brocka from a story and screenplay written by Amado Lacuesta Jr. and Ricky Lee. Starring Daniel Fernando, Allan Paule, Jaclyn Jose, and Princess Punzalan, the story follows the realities of a young, poor, rural male prostitute, who after being dumped by his American client, is forced to support himself and his family in Manila's seamy red-light district.

Produced by Award Films and Special People Productions and distributed by Viva Films, the film's frank depiction of homosexuality, prostitution, drag queens and crooked cops, the porn industry, sexual slavery, and drugs and violence caused the Philippine government censors to order extensive edits of the film. Brocka smuggled an uncensored cut out of the country to be shown to a limited number of international film festivals. The smuggled, uncensored 35 mm print of the film is part of the permanent collection of the Museum of Modern Art in New York City.

While the film was a box-office failure when it was released in the Philippines in January 1989 due to censorship, it received acclaim from critics and audiences overseas, including the 13th Toronto International Film Festival where it received a standing ovation. It is considered one of the most influential gay films from the Philippines, and atypical of its genre in that its main protagonist kills a corrupt police officer without being charged for the crime.

In 2021, Joel Lamangan directed the sequel, Anak ng Macho Dancer, which focuses on Inno, the son of Pol, portrayed by Sean De Guzman. In 2026, the film was digitally restored and remastered by Kani Releasing and Carlotta Films, who commissioned the restoration from a scanned 35mm print from Viva Entertainment's archives. The restored 4K version premiered in January 9, 2026, as part of the 22nd MOMA International Festival of Film Preservation.

== Plot ==
Pol, a poor young man from the Filipino countryside, helps his single mother support his siblings with a gay-for-pay arrangement with an American. Such arrangements are common in his village, and Pol is envious of his friend and neighbor, Greg, who makes a lot of money working in a sex club in Manila. After his client finishes his tour of duty, Pol aspires to move to Manila, and Greg agrees to give him an introduction to Manila's underground world of male strippers, prostitution, illegal drugs, sexual exploitation, and sexual slavery.

Greg leads Pol to Mama Charlie's, a male strip club in the district's tourist row frequented by American, European, and Japanese foreigners, run by drag queen Mama Charlie. The club is under the "protection" of corrupt police officer Kid, who is involved in all illegal activity in Manila. Though Mama Charlie has a strict "no drugs" policy, Pol is warned to stay away from fellow dancer Dennis, who works for Kid and provides drugs from Kid to his clients.

Pol becomes the roommate and friend of Noel, one of the club's most popular and successful workers, who takes Pol under his wing and mentors him to be a better "macho dancer" and call boy. Pol is quickly accepted into the community of sex workers and has an immediate rapport with Bambi, a young call girl who often runs into Noel and his friends after work hours, and who expresses attraction to Pol.

After their camaraderie grows, Noel reveals to Pol that he has a sister, Pining, who has gone missing. He left her with his aunties and came to Manila to earn money, but quickly found himself homeless, hungry, and sleeping in the nearby park. A man approached and offered him food in exchange for sexual favors, and Noel decided sex work wasn't too bad, leading to his current job. But, he worries his sister ran away or was driven out by their aunt, and fears she has been kidnapped and sexually exploited. Pol promises Noel his complete support for the search. The two begin combing the many female brothels and dance clubs when they have a spare moment from dancing in Mama Charlie's, receiving tips on new brothels and new girls from Bambi.

Noel asks Dennis about selling drugs to clients to make additional money to fund his search, despite this risky behavior being forbidden by Mama Charlie and putting Noel on Kid's radar. Displeased by the small cut he gets from the sales, Noel shorts Dennis the amount he owes Kid for the drugs. Hoping to avoid a violent confrontation, Noel sends Pol to speak with Kid about the missing money. Instead, Pol receives a public beating. The bloody Pol is taken in and nursed by Bambi, and the two have sex at Pol's instigation. In the morning, Pol declares that he is in love with her. Bambi is flattered, but brushes off his declaration and attributes it to his excitement at sleeping with a woman for the first time.

Noel and Pol finally discover Pining being held as a sex slave at a well-guarded brothel controlled by Kid's minions. They visit her disguised as clients. Pining tells them a very similar story to her brother's: she came to Manila to earn money, but quickly found herself homeless, hungry, and sleeping in the same nearby park her brother had. Only when a woman approached her, offering her food, was she drugged, and she woke up kidnapped and confined to a brothel. This current establishment is the second one, and the women are kept under constant surveillance and control. She begs them to leave quickly to avoid suspicion.

Noel engages in risky behavior due to his depression over how to help his sister. At Dennis's birthday party, he and the other Macho Dancers heavily indulge in drugs, alcohol, and behaviors that flirt with suicide. Pol intervenes, taking Dennis's gun and putting Noel to bed.

After earning more money filming an illegal pornography, Noel and Pol visit the brothel holding Pining again. They make an improvised escape, and Kid pursues Noel, Pining, and Pol during a heavy rainstorm. Kid fatally shoots Noel, who dies in Pol's arms. Pol takes Pining to Bambi's apartment, where she can remain hidden until he can arrange for her to leave the city. Pol also decides to return to the mountains and asks Bambi to marry him and come with him. She is tempted, but refuses to go as she has been doing sex work since age twelve and does not think she can do anything else.

Pol stalks Kid from dawn to dusk as the officer goes about his day. He shoots Kid in the head and quietly leaves the scene with no witnesses. Pol packs up Noel's apartment and picks up the money saved for Pining. He and Bambi see off Pining and give her the money that Noel saved for her education. Pol implores Bambi to marry him and return to his village, but she still refuses. They parted amicably, but sorrowfully.

On his last day in Manila, Christmas Day, he visits Mama Charlie's to say goodbye to his colleagues. The club has been raided and subsequently reopened under the new name Hijos. Although it has a new name, the club is the same – same owner, workers, decor, and even the same macho dancer routines. A new corrupt police officer will act as the club's liaison with the law in the place of Kid. Pol and Dennis repeat the "shower" choreography they used to perform with Noel. Pol boards the bus leaving Manila and leaves.

== Cast ==
- Daniel Fernando as Noel
- Allan Paule as Pol
- Jaclyn Jose as Bambi
- William Lorenzo as Dennis
- Princess Punzalan as Pining
- Timothy Diwa as Rolly
- Angelo Miguel as Jun
- Johnny Vicar as Kid
- Lucita Soriano as The Mother
- Joel Lamangan as Mother
- Khryss Adalia as Mama San
- Bobby Sano as Greg
- Charlie Catalla as Mama Charlie
- Anthony Taylor as The Manager
- Tony Mabesa as Customer 1
- Ronald Mendoza as Customer 2

== Production ==
=== Filming ===
Alan Paule and other actors playing "macho dancers" were trained by a real macho dancer for three months.

== Reception ==
=== Accolades ===
| Year | Film Festival/Award | Award | Recipient |
|---|---|---|---|
| 1990 | Gawad Urian Awards | Best Actor | Daniel Fernando |
| 1990 | Gawad Urian Awards | Best Supporting Actress | Jacklyn Jose |

=== Critical reception ===
Kevin Thomas of Los Angeles Times in 1989 commented that the film is "very steamy both in gay and straight situations" and the "cast seems to be living rather than acting their roles".
