= Isang Kahig, Tatlong Tuka (Daddy ka na, Mommy ka pa!) =

Philippine comedy film

- Directed by: Jun Aristorenas
- Written by: Bibeth Orteza
- Produced by: Victor Villegas; Marvic Sotto
- Starring: Vic Sotto; Dang Cecilio; Aiza Seguerra
- Cinematography: Max dela Peña
- Edited by: Nonoy Santillan
- Music by: Homer Flores
- Production companies: M-Zet Films; Mahogany Pictures
- Distributed by: Mahogany Pictures
- Release date: March 8, 1995
- Running time: 126 minutes
- Country: Philippines
- Language: Filipino

Isang Kahig, Tatlong Tuka (Daddy ka na, Mommy ka pa!) is a 1995 Philippine comedy film directed by Jun Aristorenas. The film stars Vic Sotto, Dang Cecilio and Aiza Seguerra.

The film is streaming online on YouTube.

== Cast ==
- Vic Sotto as Victor
- Charito Solis
- Dang Cecilio
- Aiza Seguerra
- Ruby Rodriguez
- Rez Cortez
- Berting Labra
- Candy Pangilinan
- Larry Silva
- Yoyong Martirez
- Ritchie D'Horsie
- Danny Labra
- Turko Cervantes
- Joy Viado
- Emille Espino
- Jerome Aristorenas
- Kimberly Flores
- Jean Camille Alejo
