= Banda Uno =

- Starring: Miniong Alvarez; Alfonso Carvajal; Bayani Casimiro; Manding Claro; Nenita Vidal
- Distributed by: LVN Pictures
- Release date: 1955
- Country: Philippines
- Languages: Tagalog; Filipino

Banda Uno is a Philippine movie made under LVN Pictures

== Characters ==
- Miniong Alvarez
- Alfonso Carvajal
- Bayani Casimiro
- Manding Claro
- Nenita Vidal
