= Desire (1982 film) =

- Directed by: Eddie Romero
- Written by: Eddie Romero
- Starring: John Saxon; Judith Chapman; Tetchie Agbayani
- Cinematography: Manolo Abaya
- Music by: Ryan Cayabyab
- Release date: 1982
- Country: Philippines; United States
- Languages: English, Tagalog, Filipino

Desire is a 1982 erotic comedy-drama film written and directed by Eddie Romero, starring John Saxon, Judith Chapman, and Tetchie Agbayani. Originally an entry to the 1982 Metro Manila Film Festival (MMFF), but it was ultimately not selected due to strong sexual content.

Although it was considered a lost film, the film has the only surviving copy discovered in the Romero family archives by Joey Romero, Eddie's son, which digitized from a Betamax tape and can be shown in Archivo 1984.

== Cast ==
- Tetchie Agbayani as Bessie
- Butz Aquino
- Manny Castañeda
- Judith Chapman as Julie Seaver
- Ken Metcalfe as Phil Seaver
- Maria Richwine as Cris Arias
- Ruben Rustia
- John Saxon as Joe Hale
- Charito Solis
