= Proboys =

Philippine comedy drama film

- Directed by: Ike Jarlego Jr.
- Screenplay by: Jake Tordesillas; Romer Gonzales; Owen Bobadilla; Ony Carcamo; Chris Martinez
- Story by: Jake Tordesillas; Bernardo Bernardo; Owen Bobadilla; Ony Carcamo; Chris Martinez
- Produced by: Victor Villegas
- Starring: Ruby Rodriguez; Beth Tamayo; Giselle Sanchez; Joanne Pascual; Sharmaine Suarez
- Cinematography: Ding Austria
- Edited by: Marya Ignacio
- Music by: Jimmy Antiporda
- Production company: Mahogany Pictures
- Distributed by: Mahogany Pictures
- Release date: January 18, 1995
- Running time: 104 minutes
- Country: Philippines
- Language: Filipino

Proboys is a 1995 Philippine comedy drama film directed by Ike Jarlego Jr. The film stars Ruby Rodriguez, Beth Tamayo, Giselle Sanchez, Joanne Pascual and Sharmaine Suarez. This marks the theatrical debut of Joanne, Sharmaine and Introvoys vocalist Paco Arespacochaga.

The film is streaming online on YouTube.

== Cast ==
- Ruby Rodriguez as Louie
- Beth Tamayo as Mylene
- Giselle Sanchez as Cherry Pie
- Joanne Pascual as Twinkle
- Sharmaine Suarez as Zena
- Niño Muhlach as Dennis
- Brando Legaspi as Gardo
- Jojo Abellana as Jolo
- Emilio Garcia as Mando
- Paco Arespacochaga as Mike
- Edmund Cupcupin as Paquito
- Liza Lorena as Twinkle's Mother
- Jaime Fabregas as Louie's Father
- Cecille Iñigo as Louie's Mother
- Carlo 1 as Louie's Brother
- Carlo 2 as Louie's Brother
- Pocholo Montes as Mylene's Father
- Jason San Pedro as Mylene's Brother
