= Bayani Casimiro =

Filipino dancer (1918–1989)

- Born: July 16, 1918; San Pablo, Laguna, Insular Government of the Philippine Islands, U.S.
- Died: January 27, 1989 (aged 70); Manila, Philippines
- Resting place: Loyola Memorial Park, Parañaque, Philippines
- Occupations: Filipino dancer, actor and comedian
- Years active: 1936–1989
- Spouse: Nieves Manuel
- Children: 2 (including Bayani Jr.)

Bayani G. Casimiro Sr. (July 16, 1918 – January 27, 1989) was a Filipino dancer who was among the leading stars of bodabil (vaudeville) in the 1930s and 1940s. He also appeared in musical films and later in life, in comedic roles. A tap dancer, he was frequently called the "Fred Astaire of the Philippines".

== Early years ==
Casimiro was born in Laguna. His parents were stage comedians, and at the age of 7, he would appear on stage, often dressed as a clown. By 1936, he would join a performing troupe in Hawaii headlined by Atang de la Rama.

== Bodabil star ==
By the late 1930s, Casimiro began headlining major bodabil productions in Manila. He made a name for himself as a tap dancer, often in top hat and tails, and was soon nicknamed as "The Fred Astaire of the Philippines". Casimiro also first appeared in film in 1938, when he was cast in Bayan at Pag-ibig, a production of Excelsior Pictures.

Upon the Japanese invasion of the Philippines in 1941, local film production was halted, allowing bodabil to thrive as the main source of public entertainment. Along with such actors as Rogelio de la Rosa, Norma Blancaflor and the comic team of Tugo and Pugo, Casimiro would perform at the Life Theater in Manila for the duration of the war. He would form his own comic tandem with Jose Cris Soto, and the pair would be promoted as the "Laurel and Hardy of the Philippines". Casimiro would also be paired with Dolphy, then appearing under the stage name "Golay", to form a comic dance team.

== Film and television career ==
After the war, Casimiro restarted his film career, appearing in several popular musicals for the next two decades. His frequent onscreen dancing partner was the choreographer Nieves Manuel, whom he would marry. As in his stage performances, he would often appear in films in top hat and tails. Among his more notable musical roles were in Isang Sulyap mo Tita (1953), Tres Muskiteras (1954), and Botika sa Baryo (1960).

=== Later career ===
As he aged, Casimiro became known to a younger generation primarily as a character actor in film comedies. Often cast as a grandfather, a town sage, or even as a corpse in the Chiquito vehicle Estong Tutong (1983), his thin frame and befuddled look lent to easy ridicule. A notable exception to this trend was his role in Celso Ad. Castillo's Burlesk Queen (1977), where he again donned top hat and tails as he performed onstage with Vilma Santos.

In 1985, Casimiro starred as the titular character in the IBC comedy television series The Adventures of Super Lolo.

== Death ==
Bayani Casimiro Sr. died on January 7, 1989 in Manila, Philippines at the age of 70 as a result of emphysema. His final resting place are located at the Loyola Memorial Park in Sucat, Paranaque City.

== Tribute and legacy ==
His most prominent role in later years was as the father of Enteng Kabisote (Vic Sotto) in the popular sitcom Okay Ka, Fairy Ko!. Casimiro died less than two years into the run of Okey Ka Fairy Ko. His son, Bayani Casimiro, Jr., soon joined the cast as Prinsipe ng Kahilingan. In obvious tribute to his father, Casimiro Jr.'s character would perform a brief tap dance upon his every entrance and exit.

== Personal life ==
Casimiro's widow, Nieves Manuel, would later marry Chiquito Pangan's brother, Rene Pangan. She died in 2006.

== Filmography ==
=== Film ===
- 1938 - Bayan at Pag-ibig
- 1940 - Rosa Birhen
- 1940 - Santa
- 1941 - Manilena
- 1941 - Halimaw
- 1941 - Kung Kita'y Kapiling
- 1942 - Caballero
- 1946 - So Long America
- 1947 - Maling Akala
- 1947 - Ikaw Ay Akin
- 1947 - Oh, Salapi!
- 1948 - Malaya (Mutya sa Gubat)
- 1949 - Milyonarya
- 1949 - Maria Beles
- 1949 - Makabagong Pilipina
- 1949 - Hiyas ng Pamilihan
- 1949 - Kuba sa Quiapo
- 1949 - Lupang Pangako
- 1949 - Hen. Gregorio del Pilar
- 1950 - Sohrab at Rustum
- 1951 - Shalimar
- 1951 - Maria Bonita
- 1951 - Amor mio
- 1953 - Vod-A-Vil
- 1954 - Tres Muskiteras
- 1954 - Sa Isang Halik mo Pancho
- 1955 - Dalagita't Binatilyo
- 1955 - Mariang Sinukuan
- 1955 - Banda Uno
- 1955 - Karnabal
- 1955 - Pilipino Kostum No Touch
- 1957 - Lelong Mong Panot
- 1957 - Turista
- 1957 - 10,000 Pag-ibig
- 1958 - Tuloy ang Ligaya
- 1983 - Tengteng de Sarapen
- 1984 - Hoy! Wala Kang Paki
- 1986 - Batang Quiapo – Mang Paquito
- 1987 - Mga Anak ni Facifica Falayfay – Mayor
- 1987 - No Retreat... No Surrender... Si Kumander – Lolo Boy
- 1988 - One Day, Isang Araw – Don Paquito

=== Television ===
- The Adventures of Super Lolo (1985–1986)
- Okay Ka, Fairy Ko! (1987–1989) - Vicente "Edad" Kabisote Sr.
