= Ruby Rodriguez =

Filipina actress and TV host (born 1966)

- Born: Maria Ruby Rodriguez; January 10, 1966 (age 60); Manila, Philippines
- Occupations: Host; actress
- Years active: 1986–present
- Agents: APT Entertainment; Viva Artists Agency
- Website: www.eatbulaga.tv/ruby

Mari Ruby Rodriguez-Aquino (born January 10, 1966) is a Filipina actress and a former host of the Philippine noontime variety show Eat Bulaga!.

== Career ==
Rodriguez originally started her career as a preschool teacher, later appearing in a recurring role in Okay Ka, Fairy Ko! alongside Vic Sotto and Aiza Seguerra. She has been starring as one of Eat Bulaga!'s hosts since 1991 and has since then become a regular host.

Rodriguez joined Eat Bulaga! at the age of 25, replacing Helen Vela, who left the show due to medical and health reasons that led to her death a year later. In 2021, she left Eat Bulaga! after 31 years as a co-host–counting her hiatus in hosting the program due to the COVID-19 pandemic–due to her having to take care of her son who has dyslexia, and then, her relocation to the United States to be with her daughter.

As of 2021, she is now living in Los Angeles, California and currently works at the Philippine Consulate Office.

== Personal life ==
Rodriguez has an elder sister, a doctor who died from COVID-19 in 2020.

== Filmography ==
=== Film ===
Year	Title	Role
1986	Payaso	
1988	Me & Ninja Liit	
1990	Papa's Girl	
1990	Pido Dida: Sabay Tayo	
1990	Iputok Mo... Dadapa Ako! (Hard to Die)	
1990	Ang Titser Kong Alien: Wooly Booly II	
1991	Pitong Gamol	May Sikwat
1991	Humanap Ka ng Panget	Gracia
1991	Ipagpatawad Mo	Ruby
1991	Kaputol ng Isang Awit	
1991	Darna	Vibora
1991	Okay Ka, Fairy Ko!: The Movie	Amy
1992	Alabang Girls	Butch
1992	Goosebuster	
1992	Tough Guys: Mga Batang Walong Gatang	
1992	Mahirap Maging Pogi	May
1992	Okay Ka, Fairy Ko!: Part 2	Amy
1993	Ang Boyfriend Kong Gamol	
1993	Sala sa Init, Sala sa Lamig	Malou
1993	Manchichiritchit	
1994	Once Upon a Time in Manila	Carnap victim
1994	Bakit Ngayon Ka Lang	
1994	Pinagbiyak Na Bunga (Lookalayk)	
1994	Relaks Ka Lang, Sagot Kita	Lizette
1994	O-Ha! Ako Pa?	Elsa
1994	Eat All You Can	
1994	Abrakadabra	Sadama Husina
1995	Pustahan Tayo, Mahal Mo Ako	Vicky
1995	Proboys	Louie
1995	Basta't Kasama Kita	Sare
1995	Isang Kahig, Tatlong Tuka	
1996	Ang Tange Kong Pag-ibig	
1996	Do Re Mi	
1996	Istokwa	
1996	Kung Kaya Mo, Kaya Ko Rin!	
2003	Utang ng Ama	Ginger
2004	Enteng Kabisote: OK Ka Fairy Ko... The Legend	Amy
2005	Enteng Kabisote 2: Okay Ka Fairy Ko... The Legend Continues!	Amy
2006	Enteng Kabisote 3: Okay Ka, Fairy Ko: The Legend Goes On and On and On	Amy
2007	Ouija	Yaya
2007	Enteng Kabisote 4: Okay Ka, Fairy Ko... The Beginning of the Legend	Amy
2008	Urduja	Mayumi
2010	Si Agimat at si Enteng Kabisote	Amy
2011	Enteng ng Ina Mo	Amy
2012	Si Agimat, si Enteng Kabisote at si Ako	Amy
2013	My Little Bossings	Janet Napulis
2014	My Big Bossing	
2015	My Bebe Love: #KiligPaMore	One Esplanade guest member
2018	So Connected	Lea
2024	Hello, Love, Again	Amy
TBA	Petrang Kabisote	Amy

=== Television ===
Year	Title	Role
1987–1997	Okay Ka, Fairy Ko!	Amy
1991–2021	Eat Bulaga!	Host
1991–1997	Abangan ang Susunod Na Kabanata	Trisha Llamado
1993	Kool Skool	
1999–2000	Back to Iskul Bukol	
2001–2007	Daddy Di Do Du	Empee
2005	Saang Sulok ng Langit	Yaya Rosa
2007–2008	Sine Novela: My Only Love	Tessie
2008	LaLola	Aling Marita
2010	The Biggest Loser Asia (Season 1)	Herself
2010	Sine Novela: Mars Ravelo's Basahang Ginto	Ms. O
2010	My Driver Sweet Lover	Yaya Tabs
2010	Bantatay	Voice Over
2012–2021	Pinoy Henyo	Herself / Judge
2013	Toda Max	Myka (guest role)
2013	Banana Nite (Ihaw Na)	Herself / guest
2015	Wattpad Presents: Lala Laitera	
2015	Sabado Badoo	Cameo Footage Featured
2016	Kalyeserye	Dra. Lydia Pingping
2016	Magpakailanman: Tamang Pag-ibig sa Maling Panahon	Maribel
2016	Hay, Bahay!	Nenuca / Lola Nidora
2017	Wish Ko Lang: Basahan	Nene
2019	Inagaw na Bituin	Gladdine Sevilla (Edward's Auntie)
2019–2020	One of the Baes	Madel Mendoza
2020	Ilaban Natin Yan!	
2020	I Can See You: Truly. Madly. Deadly	Marge
2021	Owe My Love	Corina "Coring" Guipit
2026	Nurse the Dead	Rosalinda "Ross" Amee
