= Bayani Casimiro Jr. =

Filipino comedian and actor

- Born: Arnulfo Manuel Casimiro; August 15, 1967
- Died: July 25, 2025 (aged 57)
- Occupations: Comedian; actor
- Known for: Role as Prinsipe K in Okay Ka, Fairy Ko! and Enteng Kabisote
- Father: Bayani Casimiro

Arnulfo Manuel Casimiro, known professionally as Bayani Casimiro Jr. was a Filipino comedian and actor. He is best known for playing the role of Prinsipe K of Okay Ka, Fairy Ko! and Enteng Kabisote.

== Early life ==
Arnulfo Casimiro was born on August 15, 1967 to dancers Bayani Casimiro and Nieves Manuel.

== Career ==
Casimiro Jr. was best known for his role as Prinsipe K (Prinsipe ng Kahilingan) of the television sitcom Okay Ka, Fairy Ko!. He inherited was made part of the Okay Ka, Fairy Ko! cast after his father died on January 27, 1989. He has also appeared in various films of the related Enteng Kabisote franchise.

Other films which Casimiro Jr. acted include Fantastic Man (2003), Martha Cecilia's, ” Asboobs: Asal Bobo (2003), M.O.N.A.Y, Iskul Bukol 20 Years After: The Ungasis and Escaleras Adventure (2008). He also appeared in the television series Kristine and Juanita Banana.

By 2019, Casimiro Jr. has already retired from acting to focus on being a graphic artist. He dismissed a viral social media post framing him as begging for alms as slander and that he is not looking to return to showbusiness.

== Death ==
Casimiro Jr. died on July 25, 2025 at age 57 due to cardiac arrest. He was a bachelor.

== Filmography ==
=== Film ===
Year	Title	Role
1991	Okay Ka, Fairy Ko!	Prinsipe K
1992	Okay Ka, Fairy Ko!: Part 2	Prinsipe K
2003	Asboobs: Asal Bobo	
2003	Fantastic Man	
2004	Enteng Kabisote: Okay Ka, Fairy Ko... The Legend	Prinsipe K
2005	Enteng Kabisote 2: Okay Ka, Fairy Ko... The Legend Continues!	Prinsipe K
2006	Enteng Kabisote 3: Okay Ka, Fairy Ko: The Legend Goes On and On and On	Prinsipe K
2007	M.O.N.A.Y	
2007	Enteng Kabisote 4: Okay Ka, Fairy Ko... The Beginning of the Legend	Prinsipe K
2008	Iskul Bukol 20 Years After: The Ungasis and Escaleras Adventure	Datu Piang
2010	Si Agimat at si Enteng Kabisote	Prinsipe K

=== Television ===
Year	Title	Role
1989–1997	Okay Ka, Fairy Ko!	Prinsipe K
2010–2011	Juanita Banana	Benjo
2010–2011	Kristine	Nonong
