= Enteng Kabisote 2: Okay Ka, Fairy Ko... The Legend Continues! =

Enteng Kabisote 2: Okay Ka Fairy Ko... The Legend Continues!
- Directed by: Tony Y. Reyes
- Written by: Isabel Da Rosa; Bibeth Orteza; Tony Y. Reyes
- Based on: Okay Ka, Fairy Ko!
- Produced by: Orly R. Ilacad; Marvic Sotto
- Starring: Vic Sotto; Kristine Hermosa
- Cinematography: Ely Cruz
- Edited by: Renewin Alano
- Music by: Jan K. Ilacad
- Production companies: OctoArts Films; M-Zet Productions
- Distributed by: OctoArts Films
- Release date: December 25, 2005
- Running time: 115 minutes
- Country: Philippines
- Language: Filipino
- Budget: ₱34 million
- Box office: ₱108.37 million (Official 2005 MMFF run) ₱158 million (Official Domestic Run)

Enteng Kabisote 2: Okay Ka Fairy Ko... The Legend Continues! is a 2005 fantasy film directed by Tony Y. Reyes. It is the second installment of the Enteng Kabisote film series and the fourth film installment based on Okay Ka, Fairy Ko!.

== Synopsis ==
The magical world Engkantasya and Earth welcome a new addition to the Kabisote family: Ada, Enteng and Faye's new baby girl - a new princess of Engkantasya.

While both worlds were happy with this new addition, darkness is once again brooding both in Engkantasya and in Earth.

In the previous film, Satana (Bing Loyzaga), the ruler of Kadiliman (the dark world), lost her powers and was vanquished by Queen Magenta. Reborn through the blood of a traitor, Satana regained her powers and vowed to destroy Engkantasya. This time she has succeeded.

With the fall of Magenta's kingdom, Faye, her only daughter, was given the duty to find the 3 missing amulets that could rebuild Engkantasya. Enteng and his family are once again sucked into the magical world and have to travel through Satana's kingdom to save Engkantasya.

With the help of their new allies, Alyssa (Marian Rivera), Ada's godmother and daughter of Ina Azul (Toni Rose Gayda), Queen of Engkantasya's Azul Kingdom, and Verdana (Jose Manalo), the battered husband turned into Princess Fiona in ogre-mode lookalike, sent by Ina Verde (Melanie Marquez), Queen of Engkantasya's Verde Kingdom, Enteng and his family have to battle dragons, sea creatures, and sword-wielding dark minions to save the fate of Engkantasya.

== Cast ==
- Vic Sotto as Enteng Kabisote
- Kristine Hermosa as Faye Kabisote
- Alice Dixson as Ina Magenta
- Aiza Seguerra as Aiza Kabisote
- Oyo Boy Sotto as Benok Kabisote
- Bing Loyzaga as Satana / Ina Amarillo
- Jeffrey Quizon as Kidlat
- Victor Neri as Drago
- Bayani Casimiro Jr. as Prinsipe K
- Joey de Leon as Panggay Pokpok
- Jose Manalo as Jose/ Verdana
- Ruby Rodriguez as Amy
- Toni Rose Gayda as Ina Azul
- Melanie Marquez as Ina Verde
- Angel Sy as Ada Kabisote
- Marian Rivera as Alyssa

== See also ==
- Okay Ka, Fairy Ko! (film series)
