= Liza Lorena =

Philippine actress (born 1948)

- Born: Elizabeth Ann Jolene Luciano Winsett; October 31, 1948 (age 77); Pampanga, Philippines
- Occupation: Actress
- Years active: 1962–present
- Known for: Binibining Pilipinas 1966 (1st Runner-Up)
- Children: 2 (including Tonton)

Elizabeth Ann Jolene Luciano Winsett (born October 31, 1948), known professionally as Liza Lorena, is a Filipina actress. She was a First Runner-Up in the Binibining Pilipinas pageant in 1966.

== Career ==
Lorena was a flight stewardess (for PAL domestic flights), tourist guide and PTTA receptionist before she became first runner-up in the 1966 Binibining Pilipinas pageant to Maria Clarinda Soriano, who placed in the Top 15 of the 1966 Miss Universe contest. After her pageantry stint, she received movie offers from Dr. Jose Perez of Sampaguita Pictures, but Jose Nepomuceno won over her. She was chosen from among 64 candidates who read the lines of Esperanza for Because of a Flower (1967), topbilled by Charito Solis and Ric Rodrigo.

She won the FAP Best Supporting Actress award for her performance in Oro, Plata, Mata (1982). In 1986, she received the Best Supporting Actress award from Gawad Urian for the filmMiguelito: Batang Rebelde.

Lorena appeared in GMA's TV series Kung Mawawala Ka (2001-2003) with Sunshine Dizon, and in ABS-CBN's Maria Flordeluna (2007) starring Eliza Pineda. She also in the cast of ABS-CBN's Apoy sa Dagat premiered on February 11, 2013, which stars Angelica Panganiban, Diether Ocampo and Piolo Pascual.

As a veteran actress, Lorena appeared in more than 185 movies and television shows since 1967. The most notable movies she played in were May Bukas Pa (2009), Guns and Roses (2011) and Legacy (2012).

== Personal life ==
Lorena was born in Pampanga on October 31, 1948. She is the mother of actor Tonton Gutierrez, whose father is former matinee idol Eddie Gutierrez.

== Filmography ==
=== Film ===
Year	Title	Role	Notes	Source
1962	Mga Tigreng Taga-Bukid	Berbola Dela Druz	Credited as "Liza Lorena"	
1967	Because of a Flower	Esperanza		
1970	Wanted: Perfect Mother	Elsa		
1973	Zoom, Zoom, Superman!	The millionairess		
1973	Supergirl			
1982	Oro, Plata, Mata	Nena Ojeda		
1982	Santa Claus Is Coming to Town!			
1984	Bagets	Toffee's mother		
1984	Hindi Mo Ako Kayang Tapakan	Josefina Hernandez		
1984	Sister Stella L.	Magazine editor		
1984	Teenage Marriage	Mrs. Nieva		
1985	Tinik sa Dibdib			
1985	Kailan Sasabihing Mahal Kita?	Mila Sevilla	Guest cast	
1988	Rosa Mistica	Donya Natalia		
1988	Puso sa Puso	Luisa		
1988	Babaing Hampaslupa	Nita		
1989	Imortal	Anna Perez Alonso-Lopez		
1992	Ngayon at Kailanman	Tita Inya		
1992	Apoy sa Puso	Mother of Beatriz		
1993	May Minamahal	Ines		
1994	Kapantay Ay Langit	Mrs. Evelyn Camua		
1994	Buhay ng Buhay Ko	Flora		
1996	Dead Sure	Mrs. Librada	Original title: Segurista	
2001	La Vida Rosa	Lola Azen		
2002	Kailangan Kita	Consuelo Duran		
2006	Sukob	Gilda		
2015	Everyday I Love You	Lola Vivian / Lavi	Uncredited	
2018	The Day After Valentine's	Ninang Celestina		
2018	Three Words to Forever	Tinay Andrada		
2019	Man, and Wife	Menang	Also producer (as My Own Mann)	
2019	3pol Trobol: Huli Ka Balbon!	Lola Risa Balbon		

- Ikaw Lamang Hanggang Ngayon (2002)
- Kailangan Kita (2002)
- My First Romance (2003)
- Kutob (2005)
- Summer Heat (2006)
- The Wedding Curse (2006)
- Barang (2006)
- Mother Nanny (2006)
- Matakot Ka sa Karma (2006)
- Sukob (2006)
- Katas ng Saudi (2007)
- Villa Estrella (2009)
- Last Supper No. 3 (2009)
- Maximus & Minimus (2009)
- I Love You, Goodbye (2009)
- The Red Shoes (2010)
- Working Girls (2010)
- Presa (2010)
- Rosario (2010)
- Captive (2012)
- Thy Womb (2012)
- Pagpag: Siyam na Buhay (2013)
- Starting Over Again (2014)
- Everyday I Love You (2015)
- The Achy Breaky Hearts (2016)
- The Day After Valentine's (2018)

=== Television / Digital Series ===
Title	Role	Notes	Source
1980–1985	Champoy	Herself	RPN
1986	Mansyon		
1987	Balintataw: "Laro Tayo ng Ku"		
1993	Maalaala Mo Kaya		Episode: "Alimasag"; Credited as "Liza Lorena"
1993	Maalaala Mo Kaya		Episode: "Recuerdo"; Credited as "Liza Lorena"
1993	Maalaala Mo Kaya		Episode: "Kapirasong Sulat"; Credited as "Liza Lorena"
1994	Maalaala Mo Kaya		Episode: "Titulo"; Credited as "Liza Lorena"
1994	Maalaala Mo Kaya		Episode: "Patailm"; Credited as "Liza Lorena"
1995	Maalaala Mo Kaya		Episode: "Keychain"; Credited as "Liza Lorena"
2000—2002	Pangako Sa 'Yo	Doña Benita Buenavista	Special Participation / Antagonist
2001	Maalaala Mo Kaya	Guest Role	Episode: "Lobo"; Credited as "Liza Lorena"
2002—2003	Kung Mawawala Ka	Doña Iluminada Montemayor	Supporting Cast / Antagonist
2003—2004	Twin Hearts	Doña Sofia Fontanilla	Supporting Cast / Antagonist
2004—2005	Spirits	Azon	
2005	Magpakailanman	Guest Role	Episode: "The Manny And Pie Calayan Story"; Credited as "Liza Lorena"
2006	Sa Piling Mo	Gina	
2007	Maria Flordeluna	Brigida "Mamita" Espero	Main Cast / Antagonist
2007	Super Inggo 1.5: Ang Bagong Bangis	Facunda	
2008	Lobo	Mrs. Blancaflor	
2008	E.S.P	Guest Role	
2008	Sine Novela: Magdusa Ka	Doña Perla Doliente	Supporting Cast / Antagonist
2008	Obra	Guest Role	Episode: "Drama Queen"; Credited as "Liza Lorena"
2008	Maalaala Mo Kaya	Rose	Episode: "Card"; Credited as "Liza Lorena"
2008	Maalaala Mo Kaya	Doray	Episode: "Kandila"; Credited as "Liza Lorena"
2009—2010	May Bukas Pa	Doña Anita Rodriguez	Supporting Cast / Anti-Hero / Protagonist
2010—2011	My Driver Sweet Lover	Helga Solis	
2010—2011	Pablo S. Gomez's Juanita Banana	Doña Cristina Buenaventura	Supporting Cast / Antagonist
2011	Agimat: Ang Mga Alamat ni Ramon Revilla: Kapitan Inggo	Belen Salazar	Supporting Cast / Anti-Hero
2011	Guns and Roses	Dolores "Dolor" Marasigan / Delta	Supporting Cast
2012	Legacy	Sophia Altamirano	Supporting Cast / Antagonist
2012	Wansapanataym	Mrs. Pluma	Episode: "Ballpen De Sarah Pen"; Credited as "Liza Lorena"
2012	Maalaala Mo Kaya	Severina	Episode: "Aso"; Credited as "Liza Lorena"
2012	Hindi Ka Na Mag-iisa	Doña Asuncion Montenegro†	Supporting Cast / Antagonist
2013	Apoy sa Dagat	Doña Ildelfonsa del Sol	Supporting Cast / Anti-Hero
2013	Akin Pa Rin ang Bukas	Señora Beatrice Villacorta	Supporting Cast / Antagonist
2014	Maalaala Mo Kaya	Mrs. Salvosa	Episode: "Train"; Credited as "Liza Lorena"
2014	Magpakailanman	Tessie	Episode: "Retokadang Ina"; Credited as "Liza Lorena"
2015	Magpakailanman	Caring	Episode: "Ang Batang Isinilang Sa Kulungan"; Credited as "Liza Lorena"
2016—2017	Magpahanggang Wakas	Malena "Lola Nenang" Del Mar	Supporting Cast / Protagonist
2016—2017	Ika-6 na Utos	Doña Amorcita Marcelo vda. de Acuzar†	Special Guest Cast / Antagonist
2017—2018	The Good Son	Matilda Gesmundo	Supporting Cast / Anti-Hero
2019	Parasite Island	Daria Salvacion	Supporting Cast / Protagonist
2020—2021	Ang sa Iyo ay Akin	Aling Magdalena Villarosa	Guest Cast / Protagonist
2022	Lolong	Doña Hilaria Cruzada	Supporting Cast / Antagonist
2023	Sparkle U: #Frenemies	Aling Matilda "Tindeng" De Dios	
2023	Fit Check: Confessions of an Ukay Queen	Dulce	Supporting Cast / Protagonist

== Awards and nominations ==
Year	Category	Award	Work	Result
1978	Best Supporting Actress	FAMAS Award	Walang Katapusang Tag-araw (1977)	Nominated
1980	Best Actress	Gawad Urian Award	Gabun (1979)	Nominated
1980	Best Actress	FAMAS Award	Gabun (1979)	Nominated
1983	Best Supporting Actress	Gawad Urian Award	Oro, Plata, Mata (1982)	Nominated
1983	Best Supporting Actress	FAP Award	Oro, Plata, Mata (1982)	Won
1983	Best Actress	FAMAS Award	Santa Claus Is Coming To Town! (1982)	Nominated
1984	Best Supporting Actress	Gawad Urian Award	Don't Cry For Me, Papa (1983)	Nominated
1984	Best Supporting Actress	FAMAS Award	Don't Cry For Me, Papa (1983)	Nominated
1985	Best Supporting Actress	Gawad Urian Award	Sister Stella L (1984)	Nominated
1986	Best Supporting Actress	Gawad Urian Award	Miguelito: Batang Rebelde (1985)	Won
1986	Best Supporting Actress	FAMAS Award	Pahiram Ng Ligaya (1985)	Nominated
1986	Best Actress	Metro Manila Film Festival	Halimaw sa Banga (1986)	Won
1987	Best Actress	Gawad Urian Award	Halimaw (1986)	Nominated
2002	Best Supporting Actress	Gawad Urian Award	The Life Of Rosa (2001)	Nominated
2007	Movie Supporting Actress Of The Year	Star Award	Mother Nanny (2006)	Nominated
2007	Best Supporting Actress	Gawad Urian Award	Mother Nanny (2006)	Nominated
2007	Best Supporting Actress	FAMAS Award	Barang (2006)	Nominated
2008	Best Supporting Actress	Gawad Urian Award	Katas Ng Saudi (2007)	Nominated
2011	Best Supporting Actress	Gawad Urian Award	Presa (2010)	Nominated
2011	FAP Award	Gawad Urian Award	Presa (2010)	Nominated
2011	Best Actress	9th Gawad Tanglaw	Presa (2010)	Won
