= Hindi Kami Damong Ligaw =

1976 drama film by Dan Cabreira

- Directed by: Danilo Cabreira
- Written by: Cesar J. Amigo
- Produced by: Douglas C. Quijano; Tomas C. Magpayo
- Starring: Charito Solis; Ronaldo Valdez; Marianne dela Riva; Ernie Garcia; Chanda Romero; Tony Santos Sr.; Lauro Delgado
- Cinematography: Rodolfo Dinio
- Edited by: Rogelio Salvador
- Music by: Orly R. Ilacad
- Production company: Lyra Ventures
- Release date: January 16, 1976
- Country: Philippines
- Language: Filipino

Hindi Kami Damong Ligaw (lit. 'We are not wild grasses') is a 1976 Filipino drama film directed by Danilo Cabreira from a screenplay by Cesar J. Amigo. It stars Charito Solis, Chanda Romero, Ronaldo Valdez, Marianne dela Riva, Ernie Garcia, and Tony Santos Sr. Produced by Lyra Ventures, the film was released in theaters on January 16, 1976.

Critic Justino Dormiendo gave the film a negative review.

== Cast ==
- Charito Solis
- Chanda Romero
- Ronaldo Valdez
- Marianne dela Riva
- Ernie Garcia
- Tony Santos Sr.
- Lauro Delgado
- Cloyd Robinson
- Angie Ferro
- Marlon Ramirez
- Melissa Sarosario
- Opalyn Forster
- Leandro Gruet
- Mona Lisa
- Pio de Castro
- Bert "Tawa" Marcelo

== Production ==
=== Music ===
The film's theme song, also titled "Hindi Kami Damong Ligaw", was written by Willy Cruz and Ernie dela Peña and sung by Didith Reyes, and became a hit single. The three had previously worked together in creating the titular theme song to the film Araw-Araw, Gabi-Gabi (lit. 'every day, every night'), which was also produced by Lyra Ventures, directed by Danilo Cabreira and starred Charito Solis.

== Release ==
Hindi Kami Damong Ligaw was released in January 1976. Critic Justino Dormiendo claimed that the first two words of the title ("Hindi Kami", lit. 'we are not') were added to comply with the Board of Censors for Motion Pictures.

=== Critical response ===
Dormiendo, writing for Sagisag, gave the film a negative review. He stated that the film tackles the issue of prostitution after many local films were already made about the topic, noting that "Danilo Cabreira's direction has no sympathy or understanding of the important issue that he chose to make a film about." Dormiendo also mentioned that Charito Solis' character experienced so much hardship in the film that he found it obvious that the role was aiming for a FAMAS Award.
