= Okay Ka, Fairy Ko! (film) =

Okay Ka, Fairy Ko!: The Movie
- DVD Cover
- Directed by: Bert De Leon; Tony Y. Reyes
- Written by: Bibeth Orteza; Bert De Leon
- Based on: Okay Ka, Fairy Ko!
- Produced by: Felix E. Dalay; Lily Y. Monteverde; Roselle Y. Monteverde; Vic Sotto
- Starring: Vic Sotto; Tweetie De Leon; Charito Solis
- Cinematography: Joe Tutanes
- Edited by: Eduardo Jarlego Jr.
- Music by: Homer Flores
- Production companies: M-Zet Productions; Regal Films
- Release date: December 25, 1991
- Running time: 125 minutes
- Country: Philippines
- Language: Filipino
- Box office: ₱31 million

Okay Ka, Fairy Ko!: The Movie is a 1991 Filipino fantasy comedy film directed by Bert De Leon and Tony Y. Reyes, the first installment of Okay Ka, Fairy Ko! film series and the first movie installment based on television sitcom, Okay Ka, Fairy Ko!.

== Synopsis ==
In the Cave of Darkness, ruled by the evil Queen of Darkness, where the wicked forces live, Luka must continue to spread evilness on Earth, or she will lose her throne to Muñita, her henchwoman. But Muñita wins the queenship after capturing Aiza, Enteng Kabisote's daughter. So Enteng and his family go through a series of adventures as he goes for the Cave of Darkness to slay the Guardian Dragon, the only cure for Aiza's sickness placed by Muñita.

== Cast ==
- Vic Sotto as Enteng Kabisote
- Tweetie De Leon as Faye Kabisote
- Charito Solis as Ina Magenta
- Aiza Seguerra as Aiza Kabisote
- Larry Silva as Pipoy
- Ruby Rodriguez as Amy
- Jinky Oda as Bale
- Bayani Casimiro Jr. as Prinsipe K
- Debraliz Valasote as Yaya E
- Tetchie Agbayani as Muñita
- Luz Fernandez as Luka
  - Richie D'Horsie as Drug Dealer (Luka's guise #1)
  - Cecille Iñigo as Financer (Luka's guise #2)
  - Ruffa Gutierrez as Sexy Female (Luka's guise #3)
- Panchito as Alfonso
- Nova Villa as Alfonso's Wife
- Romy Diaz as Contreras
- Dexter Doria as Rowena Contreras
- Phillip Salvador as Joe Pring (Crossover character from Joe Pring: Homicide Manila Police)

== Reception ==
Elvira Mata of Manila Standard wrote that "This is a very slow movie. Very slow. I fell asleep, and woke up without missing a beat".

== Sequel ==
Okay Ka, Fairy Ko!: Part 2
- DVD Cover
- Directed by: Tony Y. Reyes
- Written by: Bibeth Orteza; Vic Sotto
- Based on: Okay Ka, Fairy Ko!
- Produced by: Christabel V. Galsim; Vic Sotto
- Starring: Vic Sotto; Tweetie De Leon; Charito Solis
- Cinematography: Sergio Lobo
- Edited by: Eduardo Jarlego Jr.
- Music by: Homer Flores
- Production company: M-Zet Productions
- Release date: December 25, 1992
- Running time: 116 minutes
- Country: Philippines
- Language: Filipino

A sequel of the movie titled Okay Ka, Fairy Ko!: Part 2 was released in 1992 it is a Filipino fantasy comedy film directed by Tony Y. Reyes, the second installment of Okay Ka, Fairy Ko! film series and the second movie installment based on television sitcom, Okay Ka, Fairy Ko!. It was presented as part of Metro Manila Film Festival, and it was nominated for the Gatpuno Antonio J. Villegas Cultural Award. Aiza Seguerra was nominated for the FAMAS Award for Best Child Performer.

=== Synopsis ===
Muñita, the new Queen of Darkness comes back to life to settle the score with the Queen of Engkantasya, Ina Magenta and the Kabisotes. Muñita succeeds in turning Ina Magenta into a state of illness where the only cure is for an innocent person, Aiza, Enteng's daughter to acquire the fruit from the Tree of Healing. Enteng Kabisote, who holds a grudge against his mother-in-law, realizes that he would rather do a little sacrifice than let evil prevail, so he starts his journey along with his daughter, Aiza, and his friend, Pipoy until good prevails.

=== Cast ===
- Vic Sotto as Enteng Kabisote
- Tweetie De Leon as Faye Kabisote
- Charito Solis as Ina Magenta
- Aiza Seguerra as Aiza Kabisote
- Larry Silva as Pipoy
- Ruby Rodriguez as Amy
- Jinky Oda as Bale
- Bayani Casimiro Jr. as Prinsipe K
- Debraliz Valasote as Yaya E
- Tetchie Agbayani as Muñita
- Joel Torre as Jose Rizal
- Juan Rodrigo as Andres Bonifacio
- Roy Alvarez as Bino
- Dina Bonnevie as Kiss Lady
- Pinky Amador as Malinda
- Richie D'Horsie as Witch Doctor 1
- Yoyong Martirez as Witch Doctor 2
- Rocco Montalban as George
- Boy Alano as Bogart

=== Accolades ===
Year	Award-giving body	Category	Recipient	Result
1992	Metro Manila Film Festival	Best Child Performer	Aiza Seguerra	Nominated

== See also ==
- Okay Ka, Fairy Ko! (film series)
