= The Red Shoes (2010 film) =

- Original poster
- Directed by: Raul Jorolan
- Written by: James Ladioray
- Produced by: Tony Gloria; Tito Velasco; James Ladioray
- Starring: Marvin Agustin; Nikki Gil; Liza Lorena; Tessie Tomas; Tirso Cruz III; Tetchie Agbayani; Iwa Moto; Monica Llamas; Irene Celebre
- Cinematography: Ike Avellana
- Edited by: Ike Veneracion
- Music by: Jessie Lasaten
- Distributed by: Unitel Pictures
- Release date: March 10, 2010
- Running time: 97 minutes
- Country: Philippines
- Languages: Filipino; English

The Red Shoes is a 2010 Filipino film directed by Raul Jorolan and produced by Unitel. The film uses a non-linear narrative style, using history to frame a tale of lost love and redemption spanning close to three decades, starting in 1981 with the tragic accident in the construction of the Manila Film Center, through to the 1986 People Power Revolution, which ended the 21-year Presidency of Ferdinand Marcos, and finally concluding in 2009, which finds the major characters of the film facing the consequences of the theft of one of 3,000 pairs of shoes of the First Lady Imelda Marcos. The film won the Special Jury Prize in the 2010 Bogota International Film Festival. It participated in the 2010 Vietnam International Film Festival in Hanoi and the 2010 China Golden Rooster and Hundred Flowers Film Festival. The film was rated "A" by the Cinema Evaluation Board of the Philippines and was also cited as Best Picture in the 2010 Catholic Mass Media Awards in the Philippines.

== Plot ==
On the last day of the People Power Revolution in the Philippines in February 1986, 10-year-old Lucas Munozca (Marvin Agustin) finds himself swept up with a euphoric crowd that has entered the grounds of the Malacañang Palace. Lost in the tumult, Lucas stumbles into a room where the president's wife, Imelda Marcos, kept her infamous shoe collection. He plans to filch two pairs but only manages to steal one pair—for poetic justice and for love.

Lucas gives the pair of red shoes from the country's First Lady to the first ladies of his life. The right shoe he gives to his mother, Chat (Liza Lorena), who ekes out a living giving manicures and pedicures while seemingly unable to recover from the loss of her husband, Domingo (Tirso Cruz III), the father of her only son, who was among the 169 workers said to have been buried alive when the upper levels of the Manila Film Center collapsed under construction in 1981 for the Manila International Film Festival project of the First Lady. The left shoe Lucas gifts to the love of his life, Bettina (Nikki Gil), the daughter of one of her mother's wealthy manicure home service customers.

Lucas and Bettina eventually become a couple years later and go steady for 13 years until a betrayal ends the relationship. At this point, the red shoes again become crucial for both mother and son in their attempt to overcome their respective loneliness: Chat, in trying to contact her husband from beyond the grave through Madame Vange (Tessie Tomas), a spiritist whose main job is being an Imelda impersonator; and Lucas, in trying to redeem himself for having lost his true love in a moment of weakness.

== Cast ==
Nikki Gil and Marvin Agustin

- Marvin Agustin as Lucas
- Nikki Gil as Bettina
- Liza Lorena as Chat, Lucas' mother
- Tessie Tomas as Madame Vange, spiritist/Imelda impersonator
- Tirso Cruz III as Domingo, Lucas' father
- Tetchie Agbayani as Bettina's mother
- Iwa Moto as Gidget, Bettina's colleague
- Monica Llamas as Sabs, Lucas' current girlfriend
- Irene Celebre as Maita, woman from Lucas' past
- Valerie Bariou as Olivia, foreign girlfriend of Lucas' friend
- Renzo Renacido as the kid swimmer
- E. R. Ejercito as Ferdinand Marcos
- Sunshine Cruz as Imelda Marcos
- Eula Valdez as Corazon Aquino
- JC Tiuseco as Bongbong Marcos
- Bobby Andrews as Ninoy Aquino
- Luz Valdez as Aurora Aquino
- Al Tantay as Benigno Aquino Sr.
- Yul Servo as Peping Cojuangco
- Roi Vinzon as Butz Aquino
- Kaye Abad as Imee Marcos
- Alessandra De Rossi as Irene Marcos
- Sam Concepcion as Benigno Aquino III

== Production ==
In the third edition of Cinemalaya Philippine Independent Film Festival in 2007, a screenplay entitled 2,999, which told the story of a missing pair of shoes from Imelda Marcos's collection of 3,000 pairs of shoes, was one of the finalists that year. Unfortunately, the filmmakers were unable to finish the entry on time so they decided to pull out. Marvin Agustin liked the story so much that he called writer James Ladioray to present to Unitel President and CEO Tony Gloria, who was drawn to the story and greenlighted the project.

Jorolan, a TV commercial director, faced other challenges. Lead stars Agustin and Gil, contract actors from rival TV stations GMA Network and ABS-CBN Broadcasting Corporation, had to squeeze in shooting in their competing work schedules, stretching principal photography, which took only 20 days, over 10 months. Jorolan and Ladioray, an advertising creative director, had to shuttle in between their regular work and the movie set to complete the shoot.

Ladioray adds, "I didn't want to make an outrightly political movie. That part in our history was very decisive, I wanted to make a story that can use that turning point as a point of redemption for everyone. The shoes are a metaphor — I wanted to ask the question, would you steal for love?"

Jorolan speaks of another metaphor that was crucial to the story, the bridge. "A bridge connotes relationship, whether it's been cut short, it still holds its purpose, similar to a relationship that's been broken off. (It still holds significance)."

== Awards and recognition ==
- 27th Bogota International Film Festival, 2010: Special Jury Recognition Award (Mencion de Honor)
- 32nd Catholic Mass Media Awards Philippines, 2010 : Best Picture
- 1st Vietnam International Film Festival, 2010: Official Selection and Best Actress Nomination
- 19th China Golden Rooster and Hundred Flowers Film Festival, 2010 : Exhibition
- Cinema Evaluation Board of the Philippines, 2010 : Rated "A"
- 27th Philippine Movie Press Club Star Awards for Movies, 2011 : Nominations for the Digital Movie Category - Best Movie, Best Director, Best Screenplay, Best Cinematographer, Best Musical Scorer, Best Sound Engineer, Best Original Movie Theme Song for "Bawa't Hakbang"
- 29th Luna Awards by the Film Academy of the Philippines, 2011 : Nomination for Best Sound
