= Enteng Kabisote 4: Okay Ka, Fairy Ko... The Beginning of the Legend =

Enteng Kabisote 4: Okay Ka Fairy Ko... The Beginning of the Legend
- Directed by: Tony Y. Reyes
- Written by: Bibeth Orteza; Tony Y. Reyes
- Produced by: Orly R. Ilacad; Marvic Sotto
- Starring: Vic Sotto; Kristine Hermosa; Oyo Sotto; Giselle Toengi; Ian Veneracion; Francine Prieto; Michael de Mesa; Carlos Agassi; Jose Manalo; Aiza Seguerra; Ruby Rodriguez; Mikylla Ramirez; Ian de Leon; Arthur Solinap; Peque Gallaga
- Cinematography: Gary Gardoce
- Edited by: Renewin Alano
- Music by: Michael Alba
- Production companies: OctoArts Films; M-Zet Productions
- Distributed by: OctoArts Films
- Release date: December 25, 2007
- Language: Filipino
- Box office: ₱104,632,792.00 (Official 2007 MMFF run) ₱117 million (Official Domestic Run)

Enteng Kabisote 4: Okay Ka Fairy Ko... The Beginning of the Legend is a 2007 comedy fantasy film, the fourth and last installment of the original Enteng Kabisote films, and the sixth installment based on the Philippine television sitcom Okay Ka, Fairy Ko!. The film is an official entry for the 2007 Metro Manila Film Festival.

== Plot ==
Mortal Enteng Kabisote (Vic Sotto) and his magical fairy wife Faye (Kristine Hermosa) continue to face danger and adventure in this fourth film based on the popular Filipino television series "Okay Ka, Fairy Ko." The hazards this time include a time-traveling mirror (to cure Enteng of his amnesia, which plays Okay Ka, Fairy Ko! episodes), an evil dragon lady, a vampirish villain Dark Angel, a gun-armed bad guy, a mysterious man (later to be one of Faye's rejected suitors) and the ever-present aswangs. As always, Enteng must rise to the challenges to protect his beloved family from all the potential mayhem.

== Cast ==
=== Main cast ===
- Vic Sotto as Vicente "Enteng" Kabisote
- Kristine Hermosa as Chlorateam "Faye" Kabisote

=== Supporting cast ===
- Giselle Toengi as Ina Magenta
- Aiza Seguerra as Aiza Kabisote
- Oyo Boy Sotto as Benok Kabisote
- Mikylla Ramirez as Ada Kabisote
- Ian Veneracion as Dark Angel
- Carlos Agassi as Nardong Yakitiyak
- Michael de Mesa as Prinsipe Inok
- Caridad Sanchez as Nay Choleng Kabisote
- Francine Prieto as Dragon Lady/Beng
- Peque Gallaga as the Timelord
- Candy Pangilinan as Elsa
- Ruby Rodriguez as Amy
- Jose Manalo as Jose
- Arthur Solinap as Blasting Man/Dino
- Eunice Lagusad as Dingdong
- Eliza Pineda as Flora
- Robert Villar as Ading
- Ian de Leon as Gian

=== Special Participation ===
- Jomari Yllana as José Rizal
- Joey de Leon as Karimarimar
- Wally Bayola as Arianey No Money

=== Cameo appearances ===
- Cristine Reyes as Cristine
- Bayani Casimiro Jr. as Prinsipe K
- Ric Pacheco as Faith Healer
- Nonong de Andres as Aswang
- Clayton Olalia as Police Chief

== See also ==
- Okay Ka, Fairy Ko! (film series)
