= Enteng Kabisote 10 and the Abangers =

- Theatrical release poster
- Directed by: Marlon N. Rivera; Tony Y. Reyes
- Screenplay by: Bibeth Orteza
- Based on: Okay Ka, Fairy Ko!
- Produced by: Orly Ilacad; Marvic Sotto; Antonio Tuviera
- Starring: Vic Sotto
- Production companies: OctoArts Films; M-Zet Productions; APT Entertainment
- Distributed by: OctoArts Films
- Release date: November 30, 2016
- Country: Philippines
- Language: Filipino
- Budget: ₱90 million
- Box office: ₱70 million

Enteng Kabisote 10 and the Abangers is a 2016 Filipino superhero fantasy and comedy film directed by Marlon N. Rivera and Tony Y. Reyes. It is the tenth and last film installment of the film adaptation of the Filipino television sitcom Okay Ka, Fairy Ko!.

The film was submitted as an entry for the 2016 Metro Manila Film Festival but was not included as a finalist. It became the only Okay Ka, Fairy Ko! / Enteng Kabisote film not be featured in the film festival. The film was released in theaters on November 30, 2016, together with The Super Parental Guardians.

== Plot ==
Enteng Kabisote has been living comfortably even without his companions: his daughter Aiza, who is living in province; his youngest daughter Ada, whose studying in Cebu; his wife Faye who is now the Queen of Engkantasya; and Amy and her husband gone. Enteng also have his own company, the Enteng Kabisote Robotics (E.K.R) and partnered with three old triplets businesswomen. But he is torn between his son Benok and his pampered grandson, Benokis. He argues with Benok over who is right to raise his own son and goes on vacation in Bohol, meeting a member of "Abangers" who has the power of iron. He approaches a hotel attendant Georgia and Nicomaine and thinks the tour guide Richard is a handsome man, but disappointed, he continues the tour.

Kwak Kwak is a half-fairy that was banished by the Leaders of Engkantasya, who hatches a plan to eliminate the 7 Outcast Engkantasya Workers (OEWs) who steal his 7 powers, and eventually Enteng, the Hero of Engkantasya so that his vengeance will be complete. He has sidekicks with duckfaces and other of his minions who are also exiled Encantados.

Enteng was given a powered suit to get ready for his battle with Kwak Kwak.

Later on, Kwak Kwak and his minions attacks and captures him and the group. They are put in stasis when Enteng pleads with the scientist to renege. The group later faces and defeats Kwak Kwak and his minions.

The closing scenes depict what happened to the OEWs: Lukan has owned a gym, Beki became a comedy bar owner; Ora built a fortune teller shop in Makati that caters to the elite; the three Lolas became Eat Bulaga!'s characters (a nod from Kalyeserye's Explorer sisters); and Remo, the tour guide built his own shop.

In the end, Enteng reunites with his family and celebrated his birthday. He was surprised with his wife Faye's return with now a new face.

== Cast ==
=== Main cast ===
- Vic Sotto as Enteng Kabisote
- Epy Quizon as Doctor Kwak Kwak
- Oyo Boy Sotto as Benok Kabisote

=== Supporting cast ===
- Jose Manalo as Tini/Lola Tinidora
- Wally Bayola as Nini/Lola Nidora
- Paolo Ballesteros as Dori/Lola Tidora
- Ryzza Mae Dizon as Bubu
- Bea Binene as Allaine/A2
- Alonzo Muhlach as Benokis Kabisote
- Ken Chan as Allan/A1
- Ryza Cenon as Ruth Kabisote
- Cacai Bautista as Ora/Oring
- Jerald Napoles as Lukan/Lucas Malakas
- Jelson Bay as Remo/Remy
- Sinon Loresca, Jr. as Beki/Bistika
- Bangkay as Bibi
- Atak as Bibe
- Max Collins as Bubu's Mother

=== Special participation ===
- Joey de Leon as Pandoy/Panday/Panggay/Paolo
- Alden Richards as Richard
- Maine Mendoza as Nicomaine
- Pauleen Luna-Sotto as Faye Kabisote
- Allan K. as Fake Faye
- Aiza Seguerra as Aiza Kabisote
- Mikylla Ramirez as Ada Kabisote
- John Feir as Security Guard #1
- Mike "Pekto" Nacua as Security Guard #2
- Jaya as herself
- Ervic Vijandre as Cute Guy at the airport
- Ate Gay as Ora's costumer
- Pilita Corrales as herself
- Freddie Webb

== Production ==
=== Development ===
On August 10, 2016, a story conference was held announcing the return of Enteng Kabisote in the silver screen. The film was meant to be an entry in the 2016 Metro Manila Film Festival. Marlon N. Rivera and Tony Y. Reyes directed the film while Orly Ilacad served as co–producer. In the conference, Sotto revealed that he had second thoughts on joining the 44th annual Metro Manila Film Festival after changes were made for the selection of the competing entries and several cast members were revealed.

Enteng Kabisote 10 and the Abangers is the tenth installment in the Okay Ka, Fairy Ko!/Enteng Kabisote film franchise after two Okay Ka, Fairy Ko! films, four Enteng Kabisote films and three spin-off/crossover movies. According to Sotto, Enteng Kabisote 10 and the Abangers will have a different story and better special effects than the previous Enteng Kabisote films. He also stated that the story and characters in the film will be more "millennial".

=== Filming ===
Principal photography for the film commenced on August 9, 2016.

== Release ==
=== Critical reception ===
The film was poorly received by critics. Writing for CNN Philippines, critic Aldrin Calimlim comments that the film "seems resigned to reusing Internet memes well past their sell-by date and recycling old jokes," and adding that it's "[M]ore buggy than funny." Oggs Cruz of Rappler said, "[T]he movie never picks up. It doesn’t get remotely exciting. Everything remains inane and pointless. Simply put, Enteng Kabisote 10 and the Abangers is old, more of the same – and the franchise deserves to be put to rest."

=== Box Office ===
The movie was shown on November 30, 2016, together with Star Cinema's The Super Parental Guardians. With 257 cinemas, the movie earned ₱15 million on its first day. The movie earned a disappointing ₱70 million despite that it was shown from November 30, 2016, to January 3, 2017.

== See also ==
- Okay Ka, Fairy Ko! (film series)
