= Enteng Kabisote (franchise) =

Film franchise

Enteng Kabisote is a Filipino fantasy action comedy film franchise based on the television sitcom Okay Ka, Fairy Ko! and named for the character Enteng Kabisote, played by Vic Sotto.

== Films ==
There have been ten Enteng Kabisote films, including two Okay Ka, Fairy Ko! films and three crossover films: two with Agimat and one with Ang Tanging Ina.

Title	Release date	Director(s)	Screenwriters	Producer(s)
Okay Ka, Fairy Ko!
Okay Ka, Fairy Ko!	December 25, 1991	Tony Y. Reyes and Bert de Leon	Bibeth Orteza and Bert de Leon	Lily Monteverde and Marvic Sotto (executive producers)
Okay Ka, Fairy Ko! Part 2	December 25, 1992	Tony Y. Reyes	Bibeth Orteza and Marvic Sotto	Marvic Sotto (executive producer)
Enteng Kabisote: Okay Ka, Fairy Ko...
Enteng Kabisote: Okay Ka, Fairy Ko... The Legend	December 25, 2004	Tony Y. Reyes	Isabel da Rosa and Tony Y. Reyes	Orly R. Ilacad and Marvic C. Sotto (executive producers)
Enteng Kabisote 2: Okay Ka, Fairy Ko... The Legend Continues!	December 25, 2005	Tony Y. Reyes	Bibeth Orteza and Tony Y. Reyes	Orly R. Ilacad and Marvic C. Sotto (executive producers)
Enteng Kabisote 3: Okay Ka, Fairy Ko: The Legend Goes On and On and On	December 25, 2006	Tony Y. Reyes	Bibeth Orteza and Tony Y. Reyes	Orly R. Ilacad and Marvic C. Sotto (executive producers)
Enteng Kabisote 4: Okay Ka, Fairy Ko... The Beginning of the Legend	December 25, 2007	Tony Y. Reyes	Bibeth Orteza and Tony Y. Reyes	Orly R. Ilacad and Marvic C. Sotto (executive producers)
Si Agimat at si Enteng Kabisote (Note: Crossover with Ang Agimat)	December 25, 2010	Tony Y. Reyes	Bibeth Orteza and RJ Nuevas	Jose Mari Abacan (producer); Orly R. Ilacad, Marvic C. Sotto, Antonio P. Tuviera, Annette Gozon-Abrogar and Marlon M. Bautista (executive producers)
Enteng ng Ina Mo (Note: Crossover with Ang Tanging Ina)	December 25, 2011	Tony Y. Reyes	Danno Kristoper C. Mariquit	Charo Santos-Concio, Malou N. Santos, Marvic Sotto, Orlando R. Ilacad, Antonio P. Tuviera and Martina Eileen H. delas Alas (executive producers)
Si Agimat, si Enteng Kabisote at si Ako	December 25, 2012	Tony Y. Reyes	Bibeth Orteza	Andrea B. Ynares, Rowena B. Mendiola and Jose Mari Abacan (producers); Orlando R. Ilacad, Marvic C. Sotto, Antonio P. Tuviera, Marlon M. Bautista and Annette Gozon-Abrogar (executive producers)
Enteng Kabisote 10 and the Abangers	November 30, 2016	Marlon N. Rivera and Tony Y. Reyes	Tony Y. Reyes and the Kitchen Crew	Orlando R. Ilacad, Marvic C. Sotto and Antonio P. Tuviera (executive producers)

Enteng Kabisote: OK Ka Fairy Ko... The Legend is the first installment of Enteng Kabisote film series and the third movie installment based on television sitcom, Okay Ka, Fairy Ko!. It made ₱83.6 million, and was featured in the 2004 Metro Manila Film Festival.

Enteng Kabisote 4: Okay Ka Fairy Ko... The Beginning of the Legend is the fourth and last installment of the original Enteng Kabisote films, and the sixth film based on Okay Ka, Fairy Ko!. It was an entry at the 2007 Metro Manila Film Festival.

Si Agimat at Si Enteng Kabisote (lit. '"Amulet and Enteng Kabisote"') is a crossover film with Agimat, featuring Enteng (Vic Sotto) joining forces with Agimat (Bong Revilla) in order to save their respective worlds from evil. The film grossed ₱31 million on its opening day. It was followed by a sequel, Si Agimat, si Enteng Kabisote at si Ako.

Enteng ng Ina Mo (lit. 'Your Mother's Enteng') is a crossover film with the series Tanging Ina. It starred Vic Sotto and Ai-Ai delas Alas and is a joint production by Star Cinema, M-Zet Productions, APT Entertainment and OctoArts Films. It was an entry in the 2011 Metro Manila Film Festival and was released on December 25, 2011. The movie is the last installment of Ang Tanging Ina film series and the eighth Okay Ka, Fairy Ko! movie.

Enteng Kabisote 10 and the Abangers is the tenth movie based on Okay Ka, Fairy Ko!. The film was submitted to the 2016 Metro Manila Film Festival, but was not included as finalist. It was the first Okay Ka, Fairy Ko! film that did not feature in the Metro Manila Film Festival. The first time in five years following the unveiling of the 2024 edition's first batch of entries.

== See also ==
- List of Filipino superheroes
