= Enteng Kabisote: Okay Ka, Fairy Ko... The Legend =

- DVD cover
- Directed by: Tony Y. Reyes
- Written by: Isabel da Rosa; Bibeth Orteza
- Based on: Okay Ka, Fairy Ko!
- Produced by: Orly R. Ilacad; Marvic Sotto
- Starring: Vic Sotto; Kristine Hermosa
- Music by: Jan K. Ilacad
- Production companies: OctoArts Films; M-Zet Productions
- Distributed by: OctoArts Films
- Release date: December 25, 2004
- Running time: 115 minutes
- Country: Philippines
- Language: Filipino
- Budget: ₱30 million
- Box office: ₱101.6 million (Official 2004 MMFF run)

Enteng Kabisote: Okay Ka, Fairy Ko... The Legend (stylized onscreen as Enteng Kabisote: OK Ka Fairy Ko... The Legend) is a 2004 Filipino fantasy comedy film directed by Tony Y. Reyes. It is the first installment of Enteng Kabisote film series and the third movie installment based on television sitcom, Okay Ka, Fairy Ko!, which made about ₱83.6 million. It is also one of the films featured in the 2004 Metro Manila Film Festival.

== Plot ==
Enteng Kabisote is married to Faye, a lovely fairy princess and the daughter of Ina Magenta, the queen of Engkantasya, an enchanted world. The couple has two children, Aiza and Benok. The family is living peacefully and happily until Satana, the new Evil Queen of Darkness brings chaos to Earth by sending her servants, Romero, Lucy and Fer to poison dam reservoirs. But Venuz and Aries, armored fairies sent by Ina Magenta, stop them.

Satana turns her ire to Enteng’s family, and she sends Itim to spy on Enteng and Faye. But because of the family’s goodness to him, Itim betrays Satana. In turn, Satana transforms herself into a young girl named Tanny, who seduces and possesses Benok, but Enteng manages to stop her evil deed in time. Burning with anger, Satana captures Faye. She demands that Ina Magenta surrender her powers so she can rule the Earth. Instead, Ina sends Enteng and Benok together with Itim (transformed into a talking flying horse) to fight Satana. After numerous adventures and comic fights, they manage to rescue Faye.

== Cast ==
- Vic Sotto as Enteng Kabisote
- Kristine Hermosa as Princess Chlorateam "Faye" Kabisote.
- Giselle Toengi as Ina Magenta
- Aiza Seguerra as Aiza Kabisote
- Oyo Boy Sotto as Benok Kabisote
- Bing Loyzaga as Satana
- Nadine Samonte as Satana/Tanny and Tanya
- Bayani Casimiro Jr. as Prinsipe K
- Joey de Leon as Mulawit/Pugo
- January Isaac as Malikmata
- Jose Manalo as Jose
- Leila Kuzma as Venuz
- Patrick Alvarez as Aries
- Nikki Arriola as Lucy
- Levi Ignacio as Fer
- Jeffrey Quizon as Romero
- Ruby Rodriguez as Amy
- Michael V. as Itim/Puti

== Accolades ==
Year	Award-giving body	Category	Recipient	Result
2004	Metro Manila Film Festival	Best Make-up Artist	Alex Vicencio	Won

== See also ==
- Enteng Kabisote (franchise)
