= Juanita Banana =

- Title card
- Genre: Comedy, Drama, Romance
- Created by: Pablo S. Gomez
- Written by: Sonny Calvento; Arden Rod Condez; Denise O'Hara; Jaymar Castro
- Directed by: Jeffrey R. Jeturian
- Starring: Bianca Manalo
- Opening theme: "Mucha Juanita" by Rico J. Puno
- Country of origin: Philippines
- Original language: Filipino
- No. of episodes: 85

Production
- Executive producers: Carlo Katigbak; Cory Vidanes; Laurenti Dyogi; Ginny Monteagudo-Ocampo
- Producers: Grace Ann Bodegon-Casimsiman; Marielle Navarro-Pas; Ellen Nicolas-Criste
- Production location: Philippines
- Running time: 30-45 minutes
- Production company: GMO Drama Unit

Original release
- Network: ABS-CBN
- Release: October 25, 2010 – February 18, 2011

Juanita Banana is a Philippine television drama romance series broadcast by ABS-CBN. The series is based on a 1968 Philippine film with the same title. Directed by Jeffrey R. Jeturian, it stars Bianca Manalo in the title role. It aired on the network's Hapontastic line up and worldwide on TFC from October 25, 2010, to February 18, 2011, replacing Rosalka and was replaced by Precious Hearts Romances Presents: Mana Po.

== Overview ==
=== 1968 film ===
Juanita Banana had a movie adaptation in 1968, starring Rosemarie Sonora as Juanita, Pepito Rodriguez, the late Ricky Belmonte, German Moreno and Bella Flores which was produced by Pablo S. Gomez.

A young woman tries to catch a teardrop from a banana tree's heart believing that it gives her magical powers but she gets the fascination of a dwarf prince who uses his own magic to grant her every wish.

== Cast and characters ==
=== Villa Family ===
- Bianca Manalo as Juanita Villa
- Lito Pimentel as Val Villa
- Trina Legaspi as Daldit Villa
- Aaron Junatas as Bubwit Villa
- Isay Alvarez as Belen Villa

=== Buenaventura Family ===
- Rodjun Cruz as Joaquin Buenaventura
- Dulce as Donya Digna Buenaventura
- Lauren Young as Sunny Rose Buenaventura
- Liza Lorena as Donya Cristina
- Roy Alvarez as Don Arnulfo Buenaventura

=== The Dwarfs ===
- Matt Evans as Prinsipe Rikitik
- Carlos Morales as Haring Bradpitik
- Kalila Aguilos as Reyna Sirikit
- Joma Labayen as Ngititik
- David Chua as Walastik
- Lui Villaruz as Pepetik

=== Supporting cast ===
- Bern Josep "Bekimon" Persia as Mario Dimaguiba
- Rey "PJ" Abellana as Boy Dimaguiba
- Katya Santos as Margaux Mamaril
- Bayani Casimiro Jr. as Benjo
- Martin del Rosario as Chester
- Raye Bacquirin as Thelma

=== Special participation ===
- Miles Ocampo as Young Juanita Villa
- CJ Navato as Young Joaquin Buenaventura
- Yong An Chiu as Young Mario
- Bea Basa as Young Daldit Villa

== See also ==
- List of programs broadcast by ABS-CBN
- List of ABS-CBN Studios original drama series
