= Because of a Flower =

1967 film by Luis Nepomuceno

- Film poster
- Directed by: Luis Nepomuceno
- Written by: Jose Nepomuceno; Luis Nepomuceno
- Produced by: Luis Nepomuceno
- Starring: Charito Solis
- Cinematography: Luis Nepomuceno
- Edited by: Luis Nepomuceno
- Music by: Leopoldo Silos
- Production company: Nepomuceno films
- Distributed by: Nepomuceno films
- Release date: June 18, 1967
- Country: Philippines
- Language: Filipino

Because of a Flower (Filipino: Dahil sa Isang Bulaklak) is a 1967 Philippine drama film directed by Luis Nepomuceno. The film was selected as the Philippine entry for the Best Foreign Language Film at the 40th Academy Awards, but was not accepted as a nominee. It was the first Filipino film to be shot in color by De Luxe. The film won two awards at the 1967 Asian Film Festival: Best Actress (Charito Solis) and Outstanding Child Actress (Jenina Bas).

== Cast ==
- Charito Solis as Margarita
- Ric Rodrigo as Edilberto
- Paraluman as Victoria
- Chanda Romero as Doña Amelia
- Rod Navarro as Tony
- Ben Perez as Juan
- Liza Lorena as Esperanza
  - Jenina Bas as young Esperanza
- Grace Leonor as Cora
- Henry Stevens as Alvaro
- Matimtiman Cruz as Monica
- Joseph de Cordova as Padre
- Mary Walter as Tony's mother
- Pianing Vidal as Arsobispo

== Accolades ==
Group	Category	Name	Result
1967 Asian Film Festival	Best Actress	Charito Solis	Won
1967 Asian Film Festival	Outstanding Child Actress	Jenina Bas	Won
