= Saint Joseph's College of Quezon City =

Roman Catholic college in Quezon City, Philippines

St Joseph's College of Quezon City
- Dalubhasaan ng San Jose ng Lungsod ng Quezon (Filipino)
- Academic Excellence for Social Transformation in the Service of God and People
- Former name: Saint Joseph's Academy (1932–1948)
- Motto: Sapientia, Bonitas, Caritas (Latin)
- Motto in English: Wisdom, Goodness, Charity
- Type: Private, Roman Catholic, Co-Educational, and Research institution, offering Basic Education and Higher Education
- Established: 1932; 94 years ago
- Founder: Dutch Franciscan Sisters
- Affiliations: St. Luke’s Medical Center (Base hospital for clinical training)
- Religious affiliation: Roman Catholic, Franciscan Sisters of the Immaculate Conception of the Holy Mother of God
- Academic affiliations: PAASCU
- Chairman: Sr. Julie Saguibo, SFIC
- President: Sr. Esperanza Vistro, SFIC
- Vice-president: Sr. Josephini P. Ambatali, SFIC (VP for Academic Affairs) Sr. Esperanza L. Vistro, SFIC (VP for Administration)
- Students: > 1,000 - 1,999
- Location: 295, 1102 E Rodriguez Sr. Ave, Quezon City, 1112 Metro Manila, Quezon City, Metro Manila, Philippines; 14°37′20.56″N 121°1′30.58″E
- Campus: Urban
- Patron Saints: St. Joseph and St. Francis of Assisi
- Colors: Maroon, White, and Gold
- Nickname: Josephines
- Website: www.sjcqc.edu.ph
- Location in Metro Manila Location in Luzon Location in the Philippines

St Joseph's College of Quezon City (or simply SJCQC or St. Jo) is a Catholic private school administered by the Franciscan Sisters of the Immaculate Conception (SFIC Philippine North Province).

== History ==
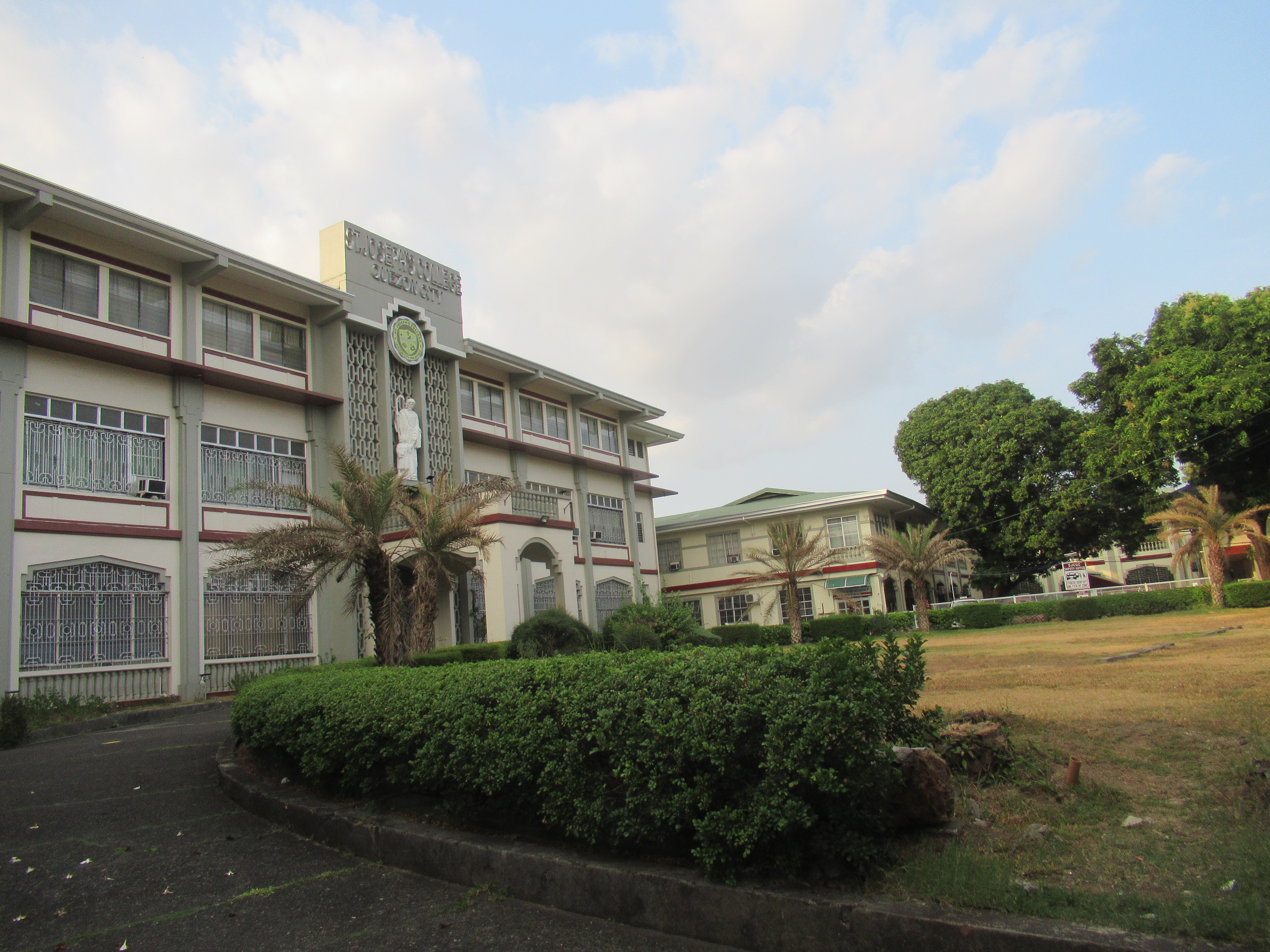
Kaligayahan Main Campus

Saint Joseph's College of Quezon City was founded in 1932 as Saint Joseph's Academy by Dutch Franciscan Sisters under the leadership of its school directress, Mother Magdala Verhuizen. Today, the school is managed by the Sororum Franscicalium Immaculada Conceptione De Mater Dei (SFIC) sisters.

During the Japanese occupation, the school was closed down and the buildings were used as a mini-military hospital by the Japanese army and later by the US military.

St. Joseph's Academy officially became St. Joseph's College of Quezon City in 1948 with the opening of the college department which offered programs in education, liberal arts, secretarial science, and music.

== Education ==
=== Accreditation ===
St. Joseph's College, together with 10 other private colleges and universities, became a charter member of the Philippine Accrediting Association of Schools, Colleges and Universities (PAASCU) in 1957. In 2013, the Grade School and High School Departments were given five years of re-accredited status for maintaining education quality. The Kinder-Grade School Department and High School Department were both granted PAASCU Level III accreditation on December 15, 2008. In 2012, the Social Work Department was granted Level IV status, the first social program in the Philippines to be accorded such status.

=== Graduate school ===
The Graduate School was opened in 1979 to specialize in education and staff development. Among its leading programs today are special education (SPED Department), early childhood education (Pre-Kinder and Kinder Department), guidance and counseling, and hospital management (Nursing Department). The doctoral programs specialize in special education and in educational leadership and management.

== Performing Arts ==
In the 1950s and 1960s, performing arts became a distinguishing feature of Josephine life. The annual play became a tradition. Plays and musicals such as Cyrano de Bergerac, Pride and Prejudice, Pygmalion, Trojan Women, Fiddler on the Roof, and Camelot were staged and drew critical acclaim.

== Current Programs and Projects ==
The school became an ETEEAP (Expanded Tertiary Educational Equivalency Accreditation Program) provider. Through ETEEAP, non-degree holders can have their learning at work and in life (skills and knowledge) assessed and recognized as equivalent to traditional course requirements to earn their degrees.

The Special Education (SPED) department was opened in 2002, while the Institute of Nursing was established in 2004 wherein St. Luke's Medical Center is their base hospital. In 2013, the Kindergarten, Grade School, and High School departments were merged into a Basic Education Department (BEd). The Senior High School Department was established in 2016.

== Social Orientation ==
The 1970s and 80s saw St. Joseph's College rise to the demands of socially oriented education. It offered a tuition-free evening high school for urban poor youths and established a grant-in-aid program for qualifying poor students.

== Notable alumni ==
- Ninoy Aquino - politician
- Sunshine Dizon - actress
- John Arcilla - actor
- Tetchie Agbayani - actress
- Pinky Amador - actress
- Zanjoe Marudo - actor
- Sonia Roco - educator and politician
- Connie Sison - GMA 7 newscaster
- Frankie Evangelista - former ABS-CBN broadcaster
- Julie Vega - child actress
- Lilet - singer, actress
- Jelo Acosta - singer, actor
