= Tetchie Agbayani =

Filipino actress (born 1961)

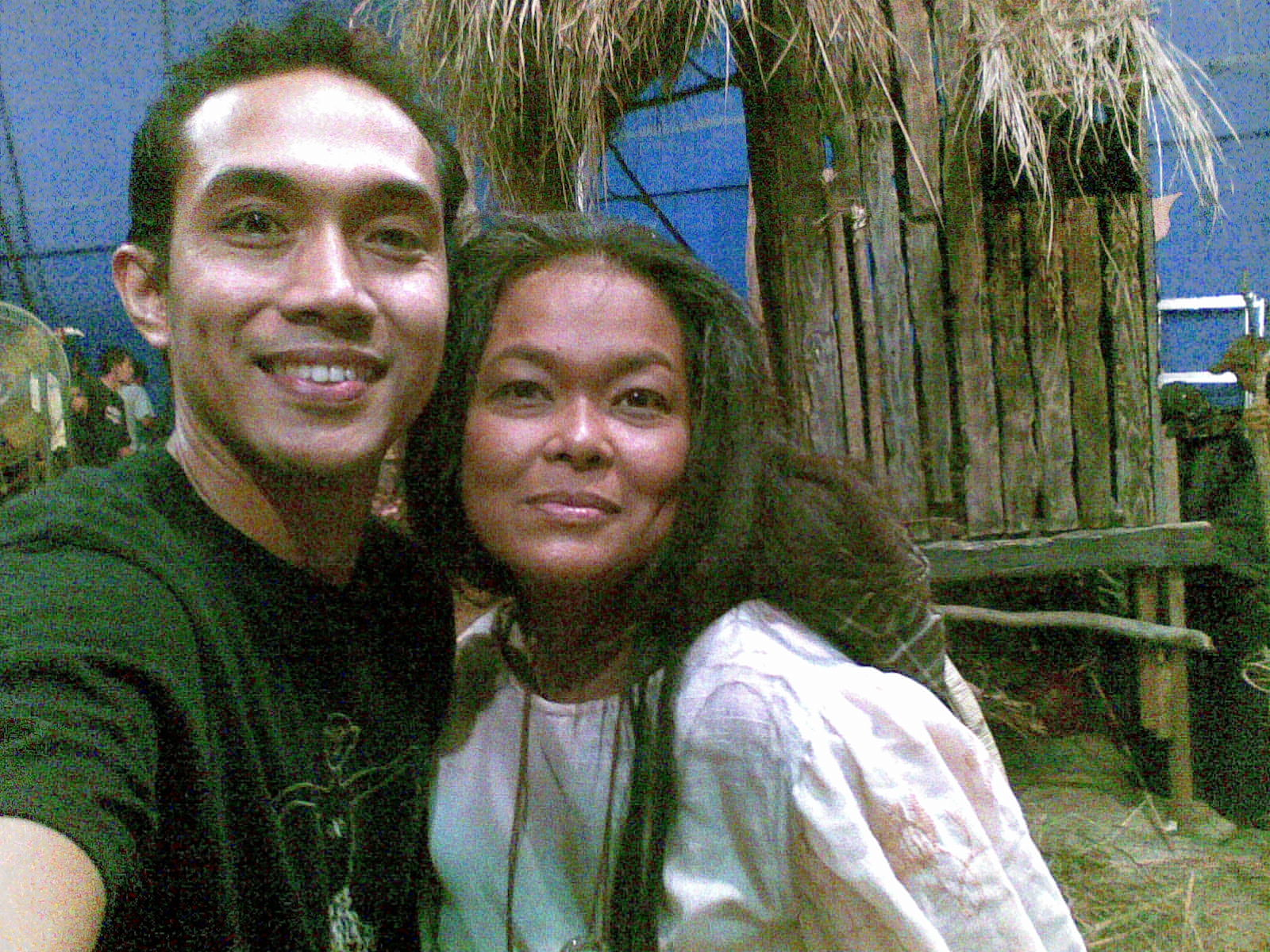
- Agbayani (with Mark Laccay) on the set of Raya Martin's film Independencia (2009)
- Born: Visitacion Parado Agbayani; July 2, 1961 (age 65); La Paz, Abra, Philippines
- Education: Saint Joseph's College of Quezon City, (BS); Ateneo de Manila University, (MA)
- Years active: 1980–present
- Children: 1

Visitacion "Tetchie" Parado Agbayani (born July 2, 1961) is a Filipino actress and model. She began her acting career in the film Pepeng Shotgun (1981), following several stints in pageantry and modelling. She was the first and only Filipino woman to appear on the cover of the German edition of Playboy, in 1982. She starred in numerous Hollywood films such as The Emerald Forest (1985), Gymkata (1985), The Money Pit (1986), Rikky and Pete (1988) and has received accolades at the Metro Manila Film Festival, in addition to nominations for a FAMAS, Gawad Urian, Star Awards for Movies and Luna Awards.

== Early life ==
Agbayani was born on July 2, 1961, to a Roman Catholic family. She studied high school at the University of Santo Tomas before enrolling in the university's Bachelor of Science in Architecture program in 1979. She eventually dropped from the program due to showbiz commitments.

== Hollywood ==
In the United States, Agbayani pursued acting in Hollywood. She appeared in international productions, sometimes credited as Carol Roberts. Her films include John Boorman's The Emerald Forest (1985); a cameo in The Money Pit (1986); leading lady in Gymkata (1985); and as a geologist in the Australian film Rikky and Pete (1988). Agbayani also appeared in an episode of the British television series Yellowthread Street.

On television, she played the tragic heroine Sisa in Eddie Romero's 1993 miniseries Noli Me Tangere, based on the 1887 novel of the same name by Filipino nationalist Dr. José Rizal.

== Personal life ==
In 1988, Agbayani returned to the Philippines and took time out from her career to give birth to her daughter, China. During this period, Agbayani devoted her whole time as a mother, living a private life for several years.

== Education ==
In 1995, Agbayani resumed her education and enrolled in Saint Joseph's College, Quezon City. She graduated with a Bachelor of Science in psychology in 2000. In 2001, she was accepted into the Master of Arts in psychology with a concentration in counseling psychology program at the Ateneo de Manila University. She completed all academic requirements and is now working on her master's thesis. She is also teaching psychology at Saint Joseph's, while doing occasional TV and film appearances.

== Filmography ==
=== Film ===
Year	Title	Role	Ref.
1980	Juan Tamad Junior		
1981	Kamakalawa	Agos	
1981	Pepeng Shotgun	Marita Abad	Credited as "Techie Agbayani"
1981	Dugong Mandirigma		
1981	Quintin Bilibid		
1981	Tondo Girl		
1981	Sambahin ang Ngalan Mo	Freda	
1982	Hubad Na Gubat		First lead role
1982	Mga Kanyon ni Mang Simeon		
1982	Desire	Bessie	
1983	Babae, Ikaw Ba'y Makasalanan		
1984	The Story of the Dolls	Lee	
1985	Gymkata	Princess Rubali	
1985	Emerald Forest	Caia	
1986	The Money Pit	Florinda Fielding	
1987	Disorderlies	Lily	
1987	Balweg	Ka Susan	
1988	Hati Tayo sa Magdamag	Antonette Revilla	
1988	Ex-Army	Ka Nenita	
1988	Rikky and Pete	Flossie	
1988	Sheman: Mistress of the Universe	Bubbles	
1989	Alyas Boy Life		
1989	Florencio Diño: Public Enemy No. 1 of Caloocan		
1989	Alyas Boy Muslim		
1989	Sgt. Melgar		
1989	Indio	Morell's friend	
1989	Lady L		
1989	Tupang Itim		
1990	Anak sa Una		
1990	Little and Big Weapon		
1990	Masikip Na ang Mundo Mo		
1990	Lessons in Love		
1990	Island of Desire		
1991	Indio 2: The Revolt	Mrs. Morell	
1991	Isang Gabi, Tatlong Babae		
1991	Okay Ka, Fairy Ko!: The Movie	Muñita	
1992	Alyas Boy Kano		
1992	Okay Ka, Fairy Ko! Part 2	Muñita	
1993	Victor Meneses: Dugong Kriminal		
1993	Sakay	Elena	
1993	Tatak ng Kriminal		
1993	Enteng Manok: Tari ng Quiapo		
1994	Rage		Alternative title: Deathfight
1996	Mula Noon Hanggang Ngayon		
2006	Close to You	Lance's mother	
2008	Yanggaw	Inday Villacin	
2009	T2	Rita	
2009	Independencia	Mother	
2010	Presa		
2010	The Red Shoes	Bettina's mother	
2010	Babe, I Love You	Lala Sanchez	
2010	Limbunan		
2011	Thelma	Floring	
2012	Unofficially Yours	Helen	
2012	Corazon: Ang Unang Aswang	Melinda	
2014	Mana		
2015	The Love Affair		
2015	Beauty and the Bestie	Coney	
2017	Finally Found Someone	Evy	
2017	Fallback	Zeny	
2021	Ang Babaeng Walang Pakiramdam	Anastacia's mother	
2027	The Last Resort	Jasmin	

=== Television ===
Year	Title	Role	Notes	Source
1987	Palibhasa Lalake			
1987–97	Okay Ka, Fairy Ko!	Muñita		
1993	Noli Me Tángere	Sisa	Miniseries	
2001	Sa Dulo ng Walang Hanggan	Consuelo Vanguardia	Supporting Role / Antagonist	
2003	Basta't Kasama Kita	Marina Lagdameo		
2006	I Luv NY	Mrs. Balumbalunan		
2007	Super Twins	Donya Vesta Paredes		
2007	Love Spell Presents: Hairy Harry	Sally		
2008	Ligaw na Bulaklak	Mina Rodriguez		
2008	Eva Fonda	Josefina Escop		
2009	Parekoy	Lucy		
2009	The Wedding	Natalie Aquino		
2010	Habang May Buhay	Ellen Corpuz		
2010–11	My Darling Aswang	Tasha		
2011	Maalaala Mo Kaya	Francisca Trillo	Episode: "Plane Ticket"	
2011	Wansapantaym Presents: Rod Santiago's: Buhawi Jack	Mildred Vergara / Ferenze Escaño		
2011	Wansapanataym	Aurora's Ma		
2011	Wansapanataym	Lucresia Marasigan	Episode: "Mga Alipin ng Lumang Aklatan"	
2011	100 Days to Heaven	Claire's mother		
2012	Dahil sa Pag-Ibig	Belinda Rivero		
2012–13	Aryana	Queen Hiyasmin		
2012	Precious Hearts Romances Presents: Hiyas	Elizabeth Salvador		
2012	A Beautiful Affair	Tala		
2013	Kailangan Ko'y Ikaw	Luisa		
2013	Maalaala Mo Kaya	Annie	Episode: "Football"	
2013	My Little Juan	Doña Tomasa Calibaquib / Evelyn Bunag		
2013	Maalaala Mo Kaya	Glo	Episode: "Tsubibo"	
2013	Got to Believe	Lucille		
2013–14	Maria Mercedes	Bettina Delaver		
2014	Pure Love	Senyora		
2014	Maalaala Mo Kaya	Mama ni Ronnie	Episode: "Bukid"	
2015	Ipaglaban Mo	Rita	Episode: "Sa Mata ng Bata"	
2015	Flordeliza	Teresa Malubay		
2016	Wansapanataym Presents: Susi ni Sisay	Carmela		
2016	Dolce Amore	Vivian Dubois		
2016	Ipaglaban Mo	Lola Senyang	Episode: "Lola"	
2016–17	The Greatest Love	Estella "Stella" Alegre-Policarpio		
2018	Tadhana	Margarita	Episode: "Sayaw sa Macau"	
2018	Contessa	Guadalupe "Guada" Sarmiento vda. de Venganza / Dragona / Queen V.	Anti-Hero	
2018	Magpakailanman	Liza	Episode: "Kapag Tumibok ang Puso"	
2018	Dear Uge	Manang Saleng	Episode: "Scary Nanny"	
2018	Maalaala Mo Kaya	Rosedel's mother	Episode: Korona	
2019	Tadhana		Episode: "Lundag"	
2019	Nang Ngumiti ang Langit	Elizabeth "Beth" Villaluna		
2019	Dahil sa Pag-ibig	Clara Corpuz		
2021	Init sa Magdamag	Olivia Alvarez		
2022	The Fake Life	Sonya De Guzman		
2023	Love Before Sunrise	Zoraya Vibal		
2025	Lolong: Bayani ng Bayan	Isabel Candelaria	replacing Malou de Guzman from Season 1	

== Awards and nominations ==
Award	Year	Category	Work	Result	Source
Cinema One Originals	2008	Best Supporting Actress	Yanggaw	Won	
FAMAS Awards	2007	Best Supporting Actress	Close to You	Nominated	
Gawad Urian Awards	2009	Best Supporting Actress	Yanggaw	Nominated	
Golden Screen Awards	2009	Best Supporting Actress	Yanggaw	Nominated	
Luna Awards	1994	Best Supporting Actress	Anak ng Pasig	Nominated	
Luna Awards	2012	Best Supporting Actress	Thelma	Nominated	
Metro Manila Film Festival	1991	Best Supporting Actress	Okay Ka, Fairy Ko!	Won	
PMPC Star Awards for Movies	2009	Best Supporting Actress	Yanggaw	Nominated	
PMPC Star Awards for Movies	2012	Best Supporting Actress	Thelma	Nominated	
