= Enteng Kabisote 3: Okay Ka, Fairy Ko: The Legend Goes On and On and On =

- Directed by: Tony Y. Reyes
- Written by: Isabel Da Rosa; Bibeth Orteza; Tony Y. Reyes
- Based on: Okay Ka, Fairy Ko!
- Produced by: Orly R. Ilacad; Marvic Sotto
- Starring: Vic Sotto; Kristine Hermosa
- Cinematography: Ely Cruz
- Edited by: Renewin Alano
- Music by: Michael Alba
- Production companies: OctoArts Films; M-Zet Productions
- Distributed by: OctoArts Films
- Release date: December 25, 2006
- Running time: 115 minutes
- Country: Philippines
- Language: Filipino
- Budget: ₱40 million
- Box office: ₱128 million (Official 2006 MMFF run) ₱144 million (Official Domestic Run)

Enteng Kabisote 3: Okay Ka, Fairy Ko: The Legend Goes On and On and On is a comedy, fantasy and action film released in 2006, the third installment of the Enteng Kabisote film series, and the fifth movie installment based on TV sitcom, Okay Ka, Fairy Ko!

== Synopsis ==
Enteng Kabisote (Vic Sotto) has a reason to gloat: business is thriving, so he thinks Ina Magenta (Giselle Toengi) will get off his case for once. And she does, but for an entirely different reason: her newest cosmetic trick is a disaster, and it's affecting the whole of Engkantasya. Satana (Bing Loyzaga) sees this as the perfect opportunity to put her plans in place, starting with a lizard who poses as Enteng. The Kabisotes must keep together even as they deal with domestic problems so that they can fight as a family against evil.

== Cast ==
- Vic Sotto as Enteng Kabisote/Lizardman
- Kristine Hermosa as Faye Kabisote
- Giselle Tongi as Ina Magenta
  - Allan K. as Gay Ina Magenta
- Aiza Seguerra as Aiza Kabisote
- Oyo Boy Sotto as Benok Kabisote
- Bing Loyzaga as Satana
- Bayani Casimiro Jr. as Prinsipe K
- Mikylla Remirez as Ada Kabisote
- Joey de Leon as Shintaro Gokoyami (from Takeshi's Castle Philippine adaptation)
- Jose Manalo as Jose
- Ruby Rodriguez as Amy
- Antonio Aquitania as Zarkov
- Paolo Ballesteros as Pao
- Ciara Sotto as Sha
- BJ Forbes as Dingding
- Pia Guanio as Darling
- Cassandra Ponti as Amazona 1
- Ehra Madrigal as Amazona 2
- Angelica Jones as Munitana (From the raise of Munita)
- Alyssa Alano as Lukasta (From the raise of Luka)
- Sugar Mercado as May
- JC Parker as June
- Ella V as April
- Tito Sotto as Nador
- Jimmy Santos as Boy ng mga Batang Digmaan
- Paul Salas
- Jinky Oda as Bale (cameo)

== Awards ==
Year	Award-Giving Body	Category	Recipient	Result
2006	Metro Manila Film Festival	Best Picture	Enteng Kabisote 3: Okay Ka, Fairy Ko: The Legend Goes On and On and On	Won

== See also ==
- Okay Ka, Fairy Ko! (film series)

Awards and achievements
Preceded by Blue Moon	Metro Manila Film Festival Award for Best Picture; 2006	Succeeded by Resiklo
