= Ipagpatawad Mo =

1991 drama film by Laurice Guillen

- Official movie poster
- Directed by: Laurice Guillen
- Written by: Olivia M. Lamasan
- Produced by: William C. Leary
- Starring: Vilma Santos; Christopher de Leon
- Cinematography: Eduardo Jacinto
- Edited by: Efren Jarlego
- Music by: Willy Cruz
- Production company: Viva Films
- Distributed by: Viva Films
- Release date: 23 October 1991
- Running time: 103 minutes
- Country: Philippines
- Language: Filipino

Ipagpatawad Mo (English: Forgive Me) is a 1991 Philippine family drama film directed by Laurice Guillen and written by Olivia M. Lamasan. Starring Vilma Santos and Christopher de Leon in their 16th film together, the film revolves around a couple who try their best to make their marriage work while they struggle with their firstborn who has autism. The film co-stars Charito Solis, Delia Razon, Bing Loyzaga, Amy Perez and Joonee Gamboa.

Produced and distributed by Viva Films, the film was theatrically released on 23 October 1991.

== Plot ==
Celina and Mike's marriage encounters turbulence when they learn that their firstborn child, Mike Jr. (nicknamed Junjun), has autism.

== Cast ==
Main cast

- Vilma Santos as Celina Esquivel
- Christopher de Leon as Mike Esquivel

Supporting cast

- Charito Solis as Carmen, Celina's mother
- Delia Razon as Isolde, Mike's mother
- Bing Loyzaga as Melanie
- Amy Perez as Monique
- Vivian Foz as Chona, Celina's sister
- Johnny Wilson as Jaime, Mike's father
- Joonee Gamboa as Gardo, Celina's father
- Edmund Cupcupin as Don Manuel
- Ruby Rodriguez as Ruby
- Jinky Oda as Jinky
- Terence Baylon as Junjun, the 8-year-old son of Celina and Mike who has autism
  - Bennet Ignacio as Junjun (3 yrs.)
- Eddie Albert Ramos as Paolo, Celina and Mike's second son
- Lorli Villanueva as Psychiatrist
- Tony Mabesa as EENT Doctor
- Ces Mathay as Mike's Friend 1
- Raul Recto as Mike's Friend 2
- Manny Mendoza as Mike's Friend 3
- Maso Diez as Singer
- Rusty Sangalang as TV Director}}

== Production ==
ABS-CBN's resident writer and producer, Olivia Lamasan, was tasked by director Laurice Guillen to write a screenplay after the latter discovered her great efforts and contributions in rewriting the scripts, including Bala at Rosaryo with Humilde "Meek" Roxas.

The lead stars, Vilma Santos and Christopher de Leon, prepared for their roles as the parents of an autistic child by visiting a special-needs school, reading materials related to the subject, watching a film with related themes, and speaking with parents whose children have autism.

== Release ==
The film received a television premiere on 22 April 1993, as a feature presentation for GMA Network's movie block, Viva Sinerama.

== Reception ==
=== Critical reception ===
Butch Francisco of The Philippine Star gave praise to the cast's performance, stating it is "a major film event of the year, with quiet and restrained performances by the cast that erupts in emotional outbursts only periodically and judiciously". Elvira Mata of Manila Standard gave a positive review, stating that she is glad that the film's story talks about a "more sophisticated subject", rather than the ones about romance and affairs. Nena Z. Villanueva, also from Manila Standard, stated that the film "should be an eye opener for such doctors and parents".

=== Accolades ===
Accolades received by Ipagpatawad Mo
Year	Award	Category	Recipient(s)	Result	Ref.
1992	1992 FAP Awards	Best Film	Ipagpatawad Mo	Won	
1992	1992 FAP Awards	Best Director	Laurice Guillen	Nominated	
1992	1992 FAP Awards	Best Actor	Christopher de Leon	Won	
1992	1992 FAP Awards	Best Actress	Vilma Santos	Nominated	
1992	1992 FAP Awards	Best Child Performer	Terrence Baylon	Won	
1992	1992 FAP Awards	Best Child Performer	Benneth Ignacio	Nominated	
1992	1992 FAP Awards	Best Editing	Efren Jarlego	Won	
1992	1992 Young Critics Circle	Best Film	Ipagpatawad Mo	Nominated	
1992	1992 Young Critics Circle	Best Screenplay	Olivia M. Lamasan	Nominated	
1992	1992 Young Critics Circle	Best Performance by Male or Female, Adult or Child, Individual or Ensemble in Leading or Supporting Role	Vilma Santos	Nominated	
1992	1992 PMPC Star Awards for Movies	Best Actor	Christopher de Leon	Won	
1992	1992 PMPC Star Awards for Movies	Best Screenplay for an Original Material	Ipagpatawad Mo (written by Olivia M. Lamasan)	Won	
1992	1992 FAMAS Awards	Best Picture	Ipagpatawad Mo	Nominated	
1992	1992 FAMAS Awards	Best Actor	Christopher de Leon	Won	
1992	1992 FAMAS Awards	Best Child Actor	Terrence Baylon	Won	
1992	1992 FAMAS Awards	Best Director	Laurice Guillen	Nominated	
