= Minióng Álvarez =

Filipino actor

- Born: 1917; Philippines
- Occupation: Actor
- Years active: 1951–1999

Minióng Álvarez (born 1917) was a character supporting actor from the Philippines who made several movies starting from his original home studio LVN Pictures. The actor had Strabismus or cross-eye problem, which helped him get comedic roles. He also did non-comedic roles usually as a father or a poor farmer.

== Filmography ==
- Pag-asa (1951)
- Talisman (1951)
- Probinsiyano (1951)
- Bohemyo (1951)
- Harana sa Karagatan (1952)
- Rodrigo de Villa (1952)
- Kuwintas ng Pasakit (1953)
- Pintor Kulapol (1953)
- Krus na Bakal (1954)
- Kandelerong Pilak (1954)
- Ikaw ang Dahilan (1954)
- Doce Pares (1954)
- Talusaling (1955)
- Banda Uno (1955)
- Mariang Sinukuan (1955)
- Casa Grande (1958)
- Balae (1958)
- Ay Pepita! (1958)
- Walang Takot (1958)
- Nukso nang Nukso (1959)
- Kundiman ng Lahi (1959)
- Tres Mosqueteros (1960)
- Batas ng .45 (1965)
- Not for Hire (1966)
- Alyas Don Juan (1966)
- Mariang Kondesa (1966)
- Napoleon Doble and the Sexy Six (1966)
- Zoom-Zoom Apollo (1969)
- Men of Action Meet Women of Dracula (1969)
- D' Musical Teenage Idols! (1969)
- Totoy Guwapo (1970)
- Ang Pangalan Ko'y Luray (1971)
- Kapitan Kulas (1975)
- Bergado (Terror of Cavite) (1976)
- Ang Lihim ni Rosa Henson sa Buhay ni Kumander Lawin (1976)
- Bertong Suklab (1976)
- Gulapa (Ang barakong mayor ng Maragondon)
- Pagputi ng Uwak, Pag-itim ng Tagak (1978)
- Buhay Artista Ngayon (1979)
- Tonyong Bayawak (1979)
- Pepeng Kuryente (1988)
- Bala...Dapat kay Cris Cuenca, Public Enemy no. 1 (1989)
- Greggy en' Boogie: Sakyan Mo Na Lang, Anna (1994)
- Tar-San (1999)
