= Okay Ka, Fairy Ko! =

Philippine television sitcom series

- Title card from 1995 to 1997
- Genre: Fantasy; Sitcom
- Directed by: Bert de Leon
- Starring: Vic Sotto; Charito Solis; Alice Dixson
- Country of origin: Philippines
- Original language: Tagalog

Production
- Executive producer: Marvic Sotto
- Camera setup: Multiple-camera setup
- Running time: 42 minutes
- Production company: M-Zet Productions

Original release
- Network: Intercontinental Broadcasting Corporation (1987–89); ABS-CBN (1989–95); GMA Network (1995–97)
- Release: November 26, 1987 – April 3, 1997

Okay Ka, Fairy Ko! (transl. you are okay, my fairy!) is a Philippine television fantasy sitcom series broadcast by Intercontinental Broadcasting Corporation, ABS-CBN and GMA Network. Directed by Bert de Leon, it stars Vic Sotto, Charito Solis and Alice Dixson. It premiered on November 26, 1987 and concluded on April 3, 1997.

== Cast and characters ==
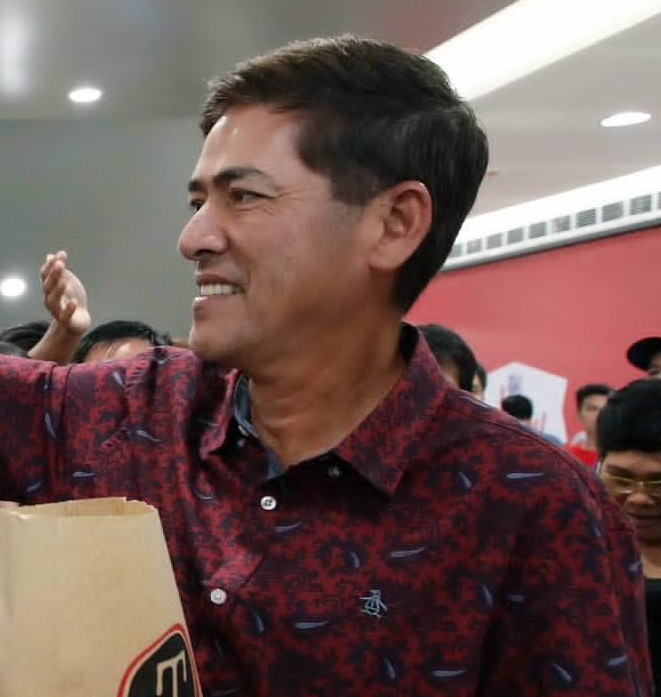
Vic Sotto portrays Enteng Kabisote.

Lead cast

- Vic Sotto as Vicente "Enteng" Kabisote Jr.
- Alice Dixson, Tweetie de Leon and Dawn Zulueta as Chlorateam "Faye" Kabisote
- Charito Solis as Ina Magenta
- Bayani Casimiro Sr. as Vicente "Edad" Kabisote Sr.

Supporting cast

- Aiza Seguerra as Aiza Kabisote
- Ruby Rodriguez as Amy
- Jinky Oda as Bale
- Larry Silva as Pipoy
- Bayani Casimiro Jr. as Prinsipe ng Kahilingan "Prinsipe K"
- Debraliz Valasote as Yaya Engkantada "Yaya E"
- Oyo Boy Sotto and CJ Ramos as Benokadzar "Benok" Kabisote
- Luz Fernandez as Luka
- Tetchie Agbayani as Muñita
- Spencer Reyes as Spencer
- Maribeth Bichara as Betchay
- Oscar Obligacion as Laviokh
- Richie D'Horsie as Richie
- Odette Khan as Satana
- Chucky Robles as Mong

== Accolades ==
Accolades received by Okay Ka, Fairy Ko!
Year	Award	Category	Recipient	Result	Ref.
1988	2nd PMPC Star Awards for Television	Best Actor in a Comedy Series	Vic Sotto	Nominated	
1994	4th Annual KBP Golden Dove Awards	Best Comedy TV Program Award	Okay Ka, Fairy Ko!	Nominated	
1996	10th PMPC Star Awards for Television	Best Comedy Show	Okay Ka, Fairy Ko!	Won	

== Franchise ==
=== Films ===
Okay Ka, Fairy Ko film spin-offs
Year	Title
1991	Okay Ka, Fairy Ko!
1992	Okay Ka, Fairy Ko!: Part 2
2004	Enteng Kabisote: Okay Ka, Fairy Ko... The Legend
2005	Enteng Kabisote 2: Okay Ka, Fairy Ko... The Legend Continues!
2006	Enteng Kabisote 3: Okay Ka, Fairy Ko: The Legend Goes On and On and On
2007	Enteng Kabisote 4: Okay Ka, Fairy Ko... The Beginning of the Legend
2010	Si Agimat at si Enteng Kabisote
2011	Enteng ng Ina Mo
2012	Si Agimat, si Enteng Kabisote at si Ako
2016	Enteng Kabisote 10 and the Abangers
