= Tuloy ang Ligaya =

Studio album by Rivermaya
- Released: October 15, 2001
- Recorded: May–August 2001
- Studio: Tracks Recording Studio
- Genre: Pinoy rock, pop rock, alternative rock
- Length: 54:11
- Label: Viva Records
- Producer: Rico Blanco

Rivermaya chronology
Rivermaya Greatest Hits (2001)	Tuloy ang Ligaya (2001)	Live and Acoustic (2002)

Singles from Tuloy ang Ligaya
- 1. "Umaaraw, Umuulan" Released: November 2, 2001; 2. "'Wag Na Init Ulo Baby" Released: 2001; 3. "Basketbol" Released: 2001; 4. "Ipo-Ipo" Released: 2001

Tuloy ang Ligaya (transl. The Fun Continues/The Joy Continues) is the sixth studio album by Filipino rock band Rivermaya. It was released in October 15, 2001 under Viva Records. The album features newly recruited guitarists Mike Elgar and Kakoy Legaspi, as well as bassist Japs Sergio; the three were recruited after founding bassist Nathan Azarcon left the group.

== Critical reception ==
Professional ratings
Review scores
Source	Rating
AllMusic	(link)

David Gonzales of allMusic reviewed the album and stating that the album has moments of brilliance but lacked excitement. He praised songs "Gising Na" & "Imposible", but criticized other songs like ""Basketbol" ("Basketball") and "Bagong Liwanag", which he described as being "tedious and dry."

== Accolades ==
Year	Award giving body	Category	Nominated work	Results
2002	15th Awit Awards	Best Alternative Recording Artist	"Umaaraw, Umuulan"	Won
2002	MTV Pilipinas Music Award	Best Director	Lyle Sacris for "Umaaraw, Umuulan"	Won
2002	MTV Pilipinas Music Award	Video of the Year	"Umaaraw, Umuulan"	Won
2002	MTV Pilipinas Music Award	Favorite Group Video	"Umaaraw, Umuulan"	Won
2003	MTV Pilipinas Music Award	Favorite Group Video	"Wag Na Init Ulo Baby"	Won

== Track listing ==
All tracks are written by Rico Blanco, except where noted.

No.	Title	Writer(s)	Length
1.	"Gising Na"		4:15
2.	"Imposible"	Rico Blanco / Rivermaya	4:12
3.	"Basketbol"		5:16
4.	"Kagat Ng Lamok"		4:07
5.	"Bagong Liwanag"	Japs Sergio	3:09
6.	"Umaaraw, Umuulan"		7:00
7.	"Karayom"	Mike Elgar	3:36
8.	"Bochog"	Mike Elgar / Rico Blanco	3:10
9.	"Age Doesn't Matter Anymore"		3:32
10.	"Desperado"	Mike Elgar	3:10
11.	"Ipo-Ipo"		7:48
12.	"'Wag Na Init Ulo Baby"		4:56

== Personnel ==
- Rico Blanco – lead vocals, guitar, keyboard & synths
- Mark Escueta – drums & percussion, trumpet, backing vocals
- Mike Elgar – guitar, backing vocals, lead vocals (tracks 7 & 10)
- Japs Sergio – bass guitar
- Kakoy Legaspi – guitar

== Album credits ==
- Executive Producer: Vic del Rosario and Vincent G. del Rosario
- Associate Producer: Rommel Sanchez
- Produced by: Rico Blanco
- A&R: Mike Dizon
- Art Direction: Rivermaya
- Album Cover Design & Layout: Mark Edward P. Escueta
- Additional Layout: Adrian "GA" J. Cabet
- Photography: Mark Edward P. Escueta and Jun de Leon
