= Ice Seguerra =

Filipino actor, singer, director, and Chairman of the National Youth Commission

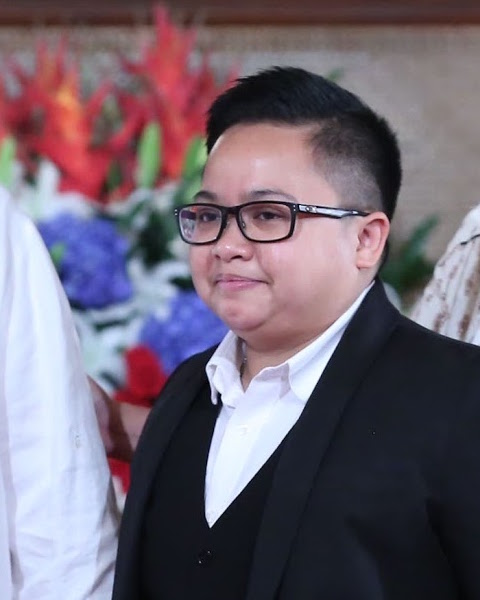
- Seguerra in August 2016

Chairperson of the National Youth Commission of the Philippines
- In office August 12, 2016 – April 5, 2018
- President: Rodrigo Duterte
- Preceded by: Gregorio Tingson
- Succeeded by: Ronald Cardema

Personal details
- Born: Cariza Yamson Seguerra; September 17, 1983 (age 43) Calauag, Quezon, Philippines
- Spouse: Liza Diño (m. 2014)
- Education: University of Santo Tomas
- Occupation: Singer-songwriter, actor, director
- Musical career
- Genres: Pop, OPM
- Occupation: Singer-songwriter
- Instruments: Guitar, vocals
- Years active: 1987–present
- Labels: Vicor Music; Universal Records; Star Music; Alpha Records

Ice Seguerra (born Cariza Yamson Seguerra; 17 September 1983), formerly known professionally as Aiza Seguerra, is a Filipino actor, singer-songwriter, director and guitarist.

Initially coming out as a lesbian in 2007, Seguerra also came out as a transgender man in 2014. On 12 August 2016, Seguerra was appointed by President Rodrigo Duterte as Chairperson of the National Youth Commission.

== Career ==
Seguerra first appeared as a three-year-old contestant of Eat Bulaga!'s "Little Miss Philippines". He subsequently became part of the show from 1987 to 1997.

As a child star, Seguerra appeared in more than 30 movies and TV shows to date. He often portrayed the role of actor and fellow Eat Bulaga! host Vic Sotto’s daughter in numerous films. He portrayed the role of Aiza Kabisote, daughter of Enteng Kabisote in Okay Ka, Fairy Ko! from 1987 to 1997. He only appeared in six films for Regal Films. At age 14, he competed in Bong Revilla's Invitational Shootfest '98, and has won several awards in the sport.

During his late teens, Seguerra began pursuing a career in music; singing and playing the guitar. His single "Pagdating ng Panahon" became a major hit in 2001 which enabled him to start a music career.

Seguerra won The Singing Bee on July 8, 2008 after Rachel Alejandro gave up her throne as defending champion due to other engagements. He defeated his co-contestant singer Bituin Escalante. Seguerra won ₱1,040,000 for a second time on July 10, raising his total winnings to ₱2,080,000.

Seguerra also performed in Singapore for the Singapore Repertory Theatre presentation of the stage play Avenue Q.

On January 7, 2013, Seguerra entered the Himig Handog P-Pop Love Songs contest as the interpreter for the song entry called "Anong Nangyari Sa Ating Dalawa", written by Jovinor Tan. He performed the song in the grand finals on February 24 at the SM Mall of Asia Arena. The song eventually finished in first place for Best P-pop Love Song thus rewarding the writer of the song with one million pesos in cash.

In 2015, he returned to GMA Network after three years to star in Princess in the Palace, which became a hit.

== Personal life ==
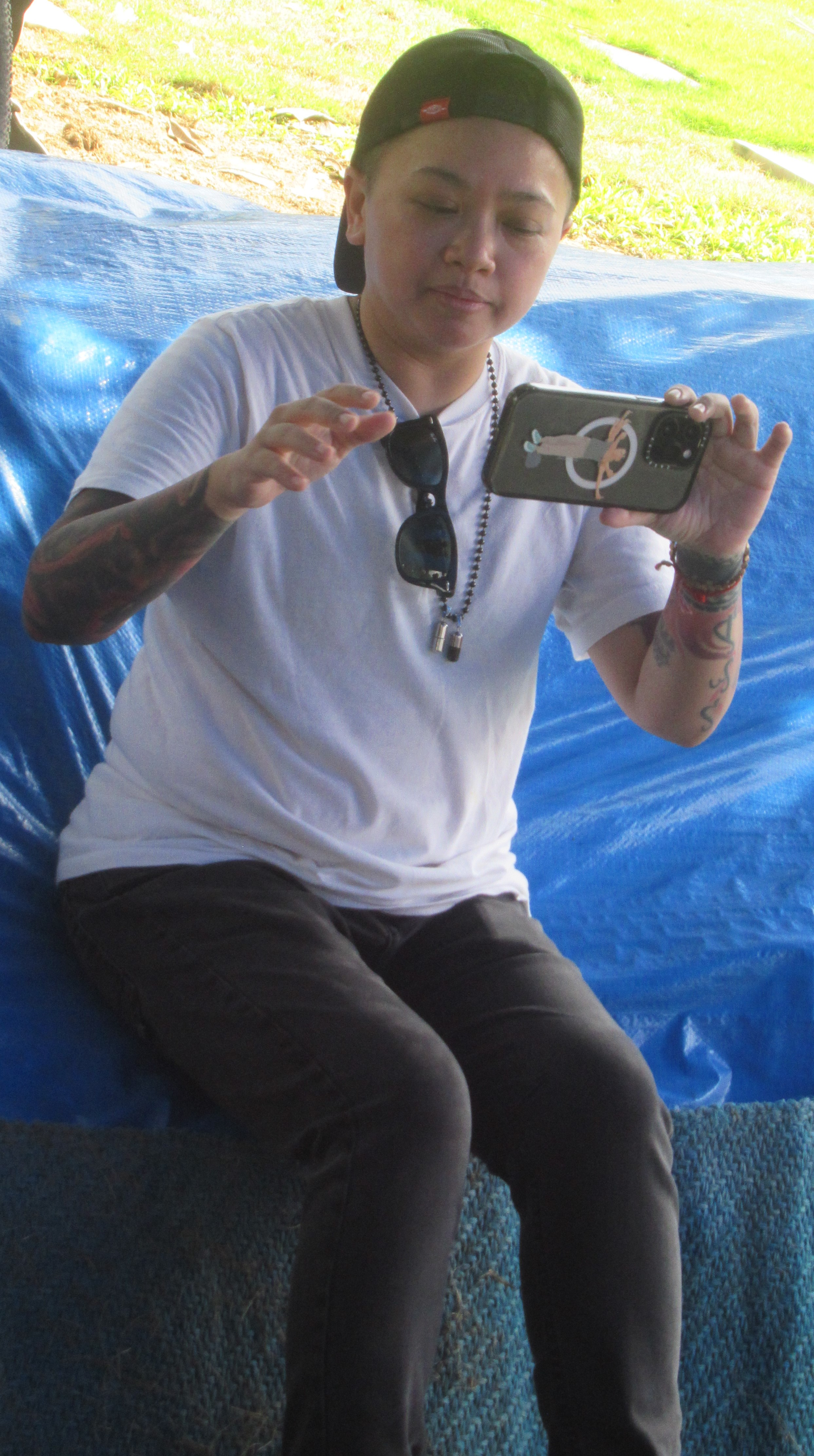
Seguerra at Loyola Memorial Park in 2023

Seguerra is the only child of Decoroso Seguerra (of Calauag, Quezon) and Caridad Yamson-Seguerra (of Bicol Region).

He studied at the Operation Brotherhood Montessori Center and later enrolled at the University of Santo Tomas, College of Music then shifted to the UST College of Fine Arts and Design and acquired a college degree.

On 18 August 2007, Seguerra came out publicly as a lesbian. In August 2014, he came out as a transgender man.

In 2013, Seguerra, along with other local celebrities, came together to join the PETA campaign 'Free Mali', a campaign aimed to release Mali, an Asian elephant currently living at the Manila Zoo and the only captive elephant in the Philippines, due to the poor facilities and keepers to care for him. Seguerra spoke up saying that "Mali has been sentenced to a life of loneliness, misery and neglect. When people all around the world are calling for Mali to be freed, in light of the suffering he has endured at the hands of the Manila Zoo, the proposal to bring in more elephants to the zoo is outrageous. They would have to endure the same cramped, concrete conditions, lack of exercise and improper veterinary care as Mali has for the past 36 years."

On 8 December 2014, Seguerra married model and actress Liza Diño in California, United States.

== Filmography ==
=== Film ===
Year	Title	Role
1988	Wake Up Little Susie	Susie Esguerra
1988	Super Inday and the Golden Bibe	Snow White
1988	Petrang Kabayo at ang Pilyang Kuting	Sugar
1988	Good Morning Titser	
1988	Me and Ninja Liit	Butchiki
1989	Aso't Pusa	
1990	Twist: Ako si Ikaw, Ikaw si Ako	Chikinini
1990	Papa's Girl	Angelita
1990	I Have 3 Eggs	
1991	Goosebuster	
1991	Okay Ka, Fairy Ko!: The Movie	Aiza Kabisote
1992	Okay Ka, Fairy Ko!: Part 2	Aiza Kabisote
1992	Dobol Dribol	Pepay
1992	Daddy Goon	Jennifer
1992	Aswang	Katlyn
1992	Shake, Rattle & Roll IV	Nikkie
1993	Rocky Plus V	Toyota/Kulit
1993	Hulihin: Probinsyanong Mandurukot	Doray
1994	Paano Na? Sa Mundo ni Janet	Jing-Jing
1995	Isang Kahig, Tatlong Tuka... (Daddy Ka Na, Mommy Ka Pa!)	
1997	Manananggal in Manila	Timmy
1997	Computer Combat	Tammy
1997	Shake, Rattle & Roll VI	Lilian
2001	Bahay ni Lola	Joey
2002	Singsing ni Lola	Karen
2004	Enteng Kabisote: Okay ka, Fairy Ko: The Legend	Aiza Kabisote
2005	Enteng Kabisote 2: Okay Ka Fairy Ko: The Legend Continues	Aiza Kabisote
2006	Enteng Kabisote 3: Okay ka, Fairy Ko: The Legend Goes On and On and On	Aiza Kabisote
2007	Enteng Kabisote 4: Okay Ka Fairy Ko...The Beginning of the Legend	Aiza Kabisote
2009	Isang Lahi: Pearls from the Orient	Cora Apurado
2009	Kimmy Dora: Kambal sa Kiyeme	Lounge singer
2010	Si Agimat at si Enteng Kabisote	Aiza Kabisote
2011	Enteng ng Ina Mo	Aiza Kabisote
2012	Si Agimat, si Enteng Kabisote at si Ako	Aiza Kabisote
2013	My Little Bossings	Ice Villanueva
2016	Enteng Kabisote 10 and the Abangers	Aiza Kabisote
2023	Becky & Badette	Himself

=== Television ===
Year	Title	Role	Notes
1987–present	Eat Bulaga!	Himself/Little Miss Philippines contestant/Co-host/Director (since 2026) (Note: Guest appearances since 2000, became a co-host again on the placeholder show E.A.T. in 2023 before going back to occasional hosting.)	
1987–1997	Okay Ka, Fairy Ko!	Aiza Kabisote	
1990–1991	It Bulingit	Himself/host	
1991–1995	Eh Kasi Bata!	Himself/host	
1993	Ipaglaban Mo: Kanino Ka Sa Pasko?	Lory	
2002	Maalaala Mo Kaya: Songbook	Theresa/Atet	
2004	Starstruck Kids	Himself/Starstruck Council	
2004	Hanggang Kailan	Gina	
2006	Maalaala Mo Kaya: Juice	Baduday	
2007	Ysabella	Alex Mendoza	
2008	Tok! Tok! Tok! Isang Milyon Pasok!	Himself/Contestant	
2008	All Star K!	Himself/Contestant	
2008	The Singing Bee	Himself/Contestant	
2008	Pinoy Dream Academy: Little Dreamers	Resident Juror	
2009	Star Circle Kid Quest: Search for the Kiddie Idol	Council	
2009	Isang Lahi	Cora Apurado	
2009–present	ASAP	Himself/co-host/performer	(Note: Took a leave of absence in 2015, but eventually returned a year later.)
2010	Diz Iz It	Himself/Judge	
2010	Maalaala Mo Kaya: Kwintas	Myla	
2010	Twist and Shout	Himself/Resident Judge	
2011	Protégé: The Battle for the Big Break	Himself/Mentor	
2012–2014	Be Careful with My Heart	Cristina Rose "Cris / Kute" Dela Rosa	
2015	Eat Bulaga Lenten Special: Lukso ng Dugo	Alex	
2015–2016	Princess in the Palace	PSG. Joey	
2016	Born to Be a Star	Himself/Judge	
2018	I Can See Your Voice	Himself/Guest	
2019	Call Me Tita	Sam	
2022	I Can See Your Voice	Himself/Guest	
2022	ASAP Natin 'To	Himself/Performer	
2022	Family Feud	Himself/Contestant	
2023–2024	E.A.T.	Himself/Co-host	
2025	Vibe TV	Performer	

==== Other TV guestings ====
Year	Title	Role	Notes	Ref.
2005	Kumikitang Kabuhayan: Philippine Eagle Conservation	Himself/Guest	As Aiza Seguerra	
2007	Star Myx Presents: Aiza Seguerra	Himself/Guest	As Aiza Seguerra	
2008	Wheel of Fortune: Thing: Binoculars	Himself/Guest	As Aiza Seguerra	
2008	That's My Doc: That's My Doc Episode # 40	Himself/Guest	As Aiza Seguerra	
2008	Boy & Kris: Boy & Kris Episode # 182	Himself/Guest	As Aiza Seguerra	
2008	Salamat Dok!: Leukemia o Kanser Sa Dugo	Himself/Guest	As Aiza Seguerra	
2009	MYX Presents: Aiza Seguerra: Live!	Himself/Guest	As Aiza Seguerra	
2013	Myx Live!	Himself/Guest	As Aiza Seguerra	
2015	The Ryzza Mae Show	Himself/Guest	As Aiza Seguerra	
2022	The Boobay and Tekla Show	Himself/Guest	As Ice Seguerra	

== Discography ==
Year	Title	Producer	Certification	Notes
1992	Aiza	Alpha Records		
1995	Little Star	Alpha Records		
2001	Pagdating ng Panahon	Vicor Music	5× Platinum	Best Pop Recording (Pagdating ng Panahon); Best Produced Record of the Year (Pagdating ng Panahon); Song of the Year (Pagdating ng Panahon); Best Female Recording Artist
2002	Pinakamamahal	Vicor Music	2× Platinum	
2002	December 25	Vicor Music		
2003	A First! Live in Concert	Vicor Music	Gold	
2003	Sabi ng Kanta	Vicor Music	Gold	
2004	Covers Uncovered	Vicor Music		
2005	Songs from the Vault	Star Music		
2007	Para Lang Sa'Yo	Star Music		Inspired by soap opera Ysabella
2008	Open Arms	Star Music		Also released in Asian countries
2009	AIZA SEGUERRA: Live!	Star Music	Gold	The first live album; includes a video CD
2010	Perhaps Love	Star Music	Gold	Also released in Asian countries
2015	Araw Gabi: Mga Awit ni Maestro Ryan	Universal Records		

== Awards ==
Year	Organization	Category	Nominated work	Result
2013	GMMSF Box-Office Entertainment Awards	Female Recording Artist of the Year	"Anong Nangyari sa Ating Dalawa"	Won
2013	Metro Manila Film Festival	Best Supporting Actress	My Little Bossings	Won
2013	Awit Awards	Best Performance By a Female Recording Artist	"With A Smile"	Won
2009	Awit Awards	Best Performance By a Female Recording Artist	Open Arms	Won
2009	ASAP Platinum Circle Awards	Platinum Female Awardee	Open Arms	Won
2009	PMPC Star Awards for Music	Acoustic Artist of the Year	Open Arms	Won
2009	MYX Music Awards	Favorite MYX Live Performance	MYX Performance	Won
2002	Awit Awards	Best Performance by a Female Recording Artist	"Pagdating ng Panahon"	Won
2002	Filipino Academy of Movie Arts and Sciences Award	Best Theme Song for the film Pagdating ng Panahon	"Pagdating ng Panahon"	Won
2002	Asian Television Awards	Best Dramatic Performance by an Actress	Maalaala Mo Kaya: Songbook	Won
2001	Quezon Medalya Ng Karangalan	Special Award	Himself	Won
1993	PMPC Star Awards for TV	Best Children's Show Host	Eh Kasi, Bata!	Won
1993	Awit Awards	Best Performance by a Child/Children Recording Artist/s	"Kahit Mayaman, Kahit Mahirap"	Won
1992	PMPC Star Awards for Movie	Child Performer of the Year	Aswang	Won

Year	Award-giving body	Category	Nominated work	Results
1988	Filipino Academy of Movie Arts and Sciences Award	Best Child Actress	Wake Up Little Susie	Nominated
1988	GMMSF Box-Office Entertainment Awards	Box-Office Queen	Wake Up Little Susie	Won
1989	Filipino Academy of Movie Arts and Sciences Award	Best Child Actress	Aso't Pusa	Won
1991	Filipino Academy of Movie Arts and Sciences Award	Best Child Actress	Okay Ka, Fairy Ko!	Won
1991	Metro Manila Film Festival	Best Child Performer	Okay Ka, Fairy Ko!	Won
1992	Filipino Academy of Movie Arts and Sciences Award	Best Child Performer	Okay Ka, Fairy Ko!	Won
2008	Awit Awards	Album of the Year	"Para Lang Sa'yo"	Nominated
2008	Awit Awards	Best Ballad Recording	"Para Lang Sa'yo"	Nominated
2008	Awit Awards	Best Inspirational/Religious Recording	"Kasama"	Nominated

== Theater ==
Year	Title	Theatre	Role
2002	The Rocky Horror Show	Carlos P. Romulo Auditorium, RCBC Towers	Eddie/Dr. Scott
2007	Avenue Q	Carlos P. Romulo Auditorium, RCBC Towers; Singapore Repertory Theatre	Gary Coleman
2010	Avenue Q	Carlos P. Romulo Auditorium, RCBC Plaza, Makati.	Gary Coleman
