= Charito Solis =

Filipina veteran film and television actress (1935–1998)

Charito Solís
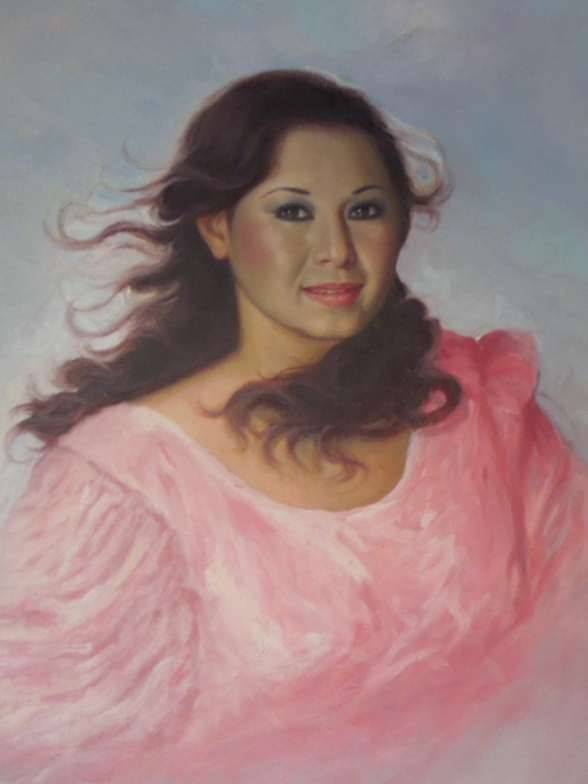
- Solis' portrait at the Mowelfund Plaza
- Born: Rosario Violeta Solís Hernández; October 6, 1935; Tondo, Manila, Philippine Islands
- Died: January 9, 1998 (aged 62); Calamba, Laguna, Philippines
- Resting place: Manila Memorial Park, Parañaque, Metro Manila
- Occupation: Actress
- Years active: 1955–1998

Charito Solís (born Rosario Violeta Hernández Solís; October 6, 1935 – January 9, 1998) was a Filipino actress whose career spanned over four decades. She was a top-billed actress for over two and a half decades, becoming the leading dramatic actress of the 1960s and the 1970s. Her accolades includes an Asian Film Festival Award, seven FAMAS Awards, three Gawad Urian, a Luna Award, and three Metro Manila Film Festival Awards.

== Early life and background ==
Rosario Violeta Solís Hernández was born in Manila. At age 19, she was introduced by her uncle, the film director F. H. Constantino to Doña Narcisa de León, the head of LVN Pictures, who cast her to star in her initial film Niña Bonita, an adaptation of Frank Capra's It Happened One Night. The film was a success, and marked the beginning of Solís' 43-year career in film, lasting until her death. Solís died on January 9, 1998, in Calamba from cardiac arrest. She was buried at Manila Memorial Park in Parañaque.

== Career ==
=== 1955–1961: Breakthrough under LVN Pictures ===
Solis first appeared in the romantic comedy Niña Bonita (1955), an adaptation of Frank Capra's It Happened One Night, opposite Jaime de la Rosa. Shot on location at the campus of University of the Philippines, she next starred opposite Leroy Salvador in the romantic musical Charito, I Love You (1956). The following year, Solis starred in Krisalis which became a box-office success. The same year, she received her first FAMAS Award for Best Actress nomination for her role in the romantic drama Ulilang Bituin opposite Mario Montenegro. In 1958, Solis next appeared in the family drama Malvarosa. The film competed at the Asian Film Festival, earning her international acclaim after receiving a nomination for Best Actress. She appeared in two more motion pictures later that year, Villa Milagrosa and Rose Tattoo ng Buhay Ko. The next two years were banners ones for Solis, winning the FAMAS Award for Best Actress for her roles in Kundiman ng Lahi and Emily. During this period, she also began appearing in several international productions. Solis starred as the wife of Gautama Buddha in the Japanese historical epic, Buddha (1961). The following year, she starred in another Japanese film The Princess and I opposite Kojiro Hongo.

=== 1962–1966: Freelancer and television venture ===
Following the closure of LVN Pictures, Solis became a freelancer and starred in numerous films for other major film outfits. In 1962, she next starred opposite Pancho Magalona in the period drama El Filibusterismo, based on the 1891 novel of the same name, by José Rizal. The following year, Solis starred in two major productions. She was handpicked to star as the titular role in the romantic drama Angustia. Later that year, she played three leading identical characters, each as wife, hostess, and nympho, in the drama Tatlong Mukha ni Pandora. For her performance, she received two FAMAS Award for Best Actress nominations for her roles in each of the films, winning one for Angustia.

Solis next starred opposite three leading men, Vic Vargas, Edgar Salcedo, and Ramil Rodriguez in the romantic drama Mga Pag-ibig ni Christine. She also appeared in three more productions later that year, Ang Tao ay Makasalanan, Kapag Langit ang Umusig and Claudia. Also in 1966, Solis ventured television through the self-titled drama anthology The Charito Solis Show under ABS-CBN.

=== 1967–1971: Nepomuceno productions and international acclaim ===
Solis reportedly signed a million-peso five year contract with Nepomuceno Productions. She starred opposite Ric Rodrigo in the romantic drama Dahil sa Isang Bulaklak in 1967 under Nepomuceno Productions. The film was a commercial success and was shown at the Manila Grand Opera House for several months, marking the revival of the production company. The film was reportedly produced for ₱500,000 and has earned Solis critical acclaim, with Los Angeles Times calling her the "number one star of the Philippine cinema". The film was also selected as the country’s official entry at the 40th Academy Awards, but fell short of being nominated. Despite this, Solis and Luis Nepomuceno were invited at the ceremony, becoming the first Filipino artists to attend the award ceremony.

The following year, Solis starred opposite American actors James Shigeta, Alex Nicol, and John Ashley in the war film Manila, Open City. She next starred as an Igorot maiden in Igorota. The film gave Solis her fourth FAMAS Award for Best Actress win. In 1969, she starred in the melodrama Ang Pulubi, which was competed at the Manila Film Festival, earning her another best actress win. The following year, Solis played the innocent turned bandit leader in the action drama The Hunted.

=== 1972–1986: Continued success ===
Solis returned to television through the weekly drama anthology Obra Maestra. She worked closely with the director of the series, Nick Lizaso and went through each of the sequence of the script. She next starred in the drama film Araw-araw, Gabi-gabi, which was competed at the first ever Metro Manila Film Festival, where she won Best Actress. Solis appeared in two drama productions the following year. She starred opposite Christopher de Leon in the romantic drama Mrs. Teresa Abad Ako Po si Bing, and in the drama Hindi Kami Damong Ligaw. Solis next starred in the romantic drama Walang Katapusang Tag-araw, alongside Eddie Garcia and Mat Ranillo III. Under the direction of Ishmael Bernal, the film was competed at the third Metro Manila Film Festival.

In 1979, Lino Brocka cast Solis as Paula in the staging of Larawan, which was based on Nick Joaquin’s A Portrait of the Artist as Filipino. Held at the Dulaang Raha Sulayman, Fort Santiago, she was joined by Lolita Rodriguez and Philip Salvador. Brocka cast both Solis and Rodriguez later that year in the family drama Ina, Kapatid, Anak. For her performance, Solis won the Gawad Urian for Best Actress. For the first time since she began her acting career, Solis was cast in a secondary role in the psychological horror Kisapmata. For her performance, she won Best Supporting Actress at the Gawad Urian and Metro Manila Film Festival, her second trophies in each of the award-giving bodies.

=== 1987–1998: Okay Ka, Fairy Ko! and final projects ===
Solis played Ina Magenta, the queen of the world of enkantasya, in the fantasy sitcom series Okay Ka, Fairy Ko!, which also stars Vic Sotto. In 1988, Solis appeared in six film productions. She starred with Mat Ranillo III, who plays the titular role, in the religious biographical film Lorenzo Ruiz... The Saint... A Filipino! In the early 1990s, Solis reprised her role as Ina Magenta in the film sequels Okay Ka, Fairy Ko!: The Movie (1991) and Okay Ka, Fairy Ko! Part 2 (1992).

== Death ==
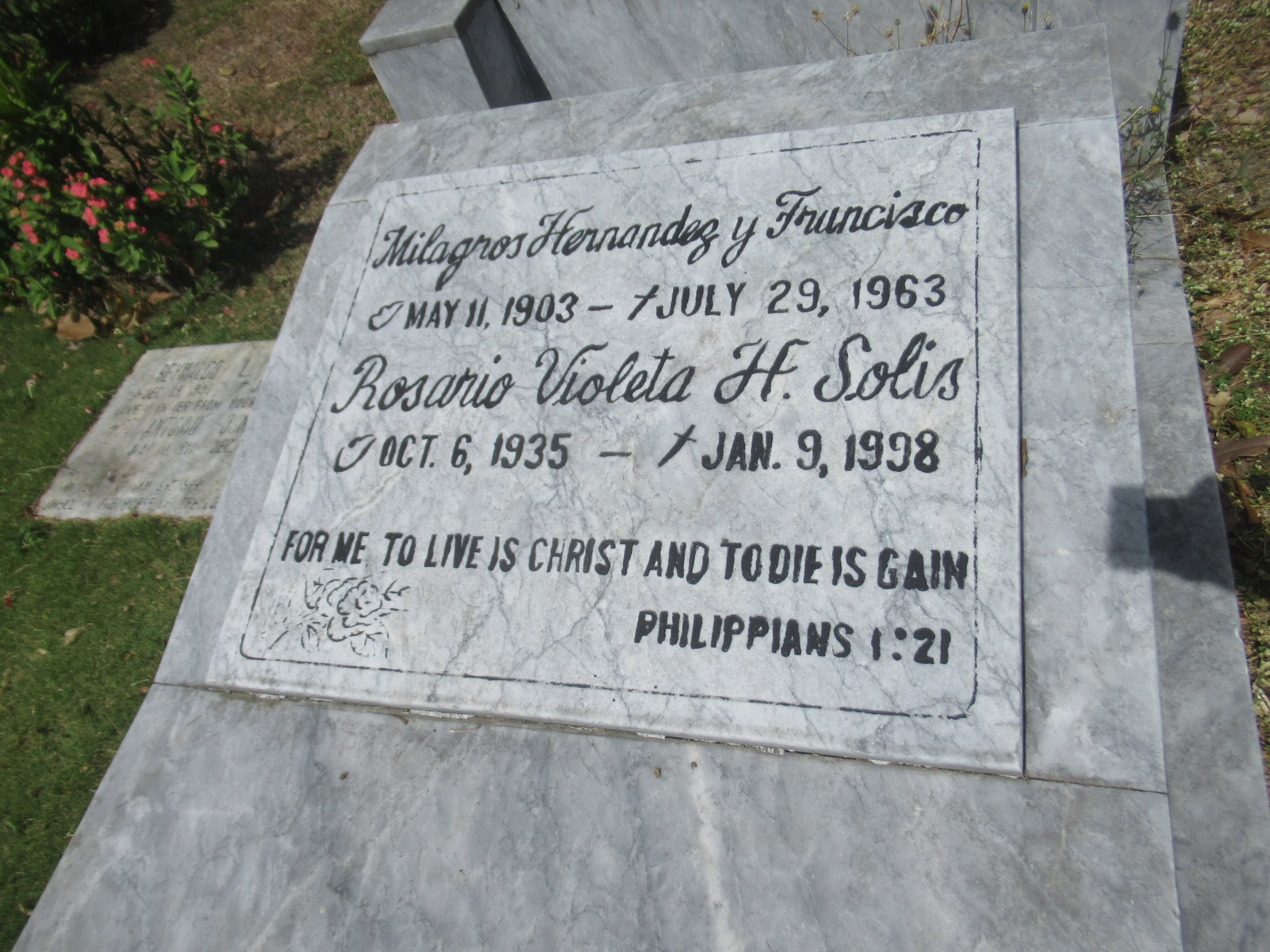
Solis's grave at Manila Memorial Park – Sucat.

On January 9, 1998, Solis died of cardiac arrest. She was 62.

== Public image and reception ==
Solis has been described by numerous publications as the Philippines' "Empress of Drama". She was voted fourth in S Magazine's "15 Best Actresses of All Time" list while Yes! magazine and the Directors’ Guild of the Philippines Inc. included her on their list of "15 Best Filipino Actresses of All Time". Solis also achieved international acclaim for her film work. She was the first Filipino actress to topbill an internationally produced Japanese film with the historical epic Buddha (1961) opposite Kojiro Hongo.

== Acting credits ==
=== Film ===
Year	Title	Role
1958	Villa Milagrosa	Virginia
1958	Malvarosa	Rosa
1959	Kundiman ng Lahi	Isang
1960	Kung Ako'y Mahal Mo	Lydia Amante
1962	El filibusterismo	Juli
1974	Mga Tigre ng Sierracruz	Ramona
1975	Araw-Araw, Gabi-Gabi	
1976	Hindi Kami Damong Ligaw	
1976	Babae... Sa Likod ng Salamin	Laura / Lorna
1977	Walang Katapusang Tag-Araw	Matilde Montalban
1979	Init	Osa
1979	Ina, Kapatid, Anak	Emilia
1979	Modelong Tanso	Ramona Ferreira
1982	Cross My Heart	Cecille
1984	Hindi Mo Ako Kayang Tapakan	Doña Consuelo Romero
1984	Teenage Marriage	Mrs. Enage
1984	Shake, Rattle & Roll	Lorna Delfin (Episode: "Pridyider")
1985	God, Save Me!	Ondeng
1987	The Sisters	
1987	Susuko Ba Ako Inay?	
1987	Takbo...! Bilis...! Takboooo	
1987	Anak Badjao	
1987	Huwag Mong Buhayin ang Bangkay	Aurora
1988	Rosa Mistica	Nyora Diday
1988	Hiwaga sa Balete Drive	Helga
1988	Mirror, Mirror on the Wall	Fe
1988	Lorenzo Ruiz... The Saint... A Filipino!	
1988	Bala Ko ang Hahatol	
1991	Ang Utol Kong Hoodlum	Madame Lily
1991	Ipagpatawad Mo	Carmen
1992	Miss Na Miss Kita (Utol Kong Hoodlum II)	Madame Lily
1992	Alyas Pogi 2	Sianang
1993	Dahil Mahal Kita (The Dolzura Cortez Story)	Mother
1994	Hindi Pa Tapos ang Labada, Darling	Victorio's mother
1994	Kadenang Bulaklak	Miss Conchita Carbonell
1994	Megamol	Atty. Sabel Enriquez
1995	The Flor Contemplacion Story	Lydia Montilla
1996	Enteng and the Shaolin Kid	Tia Rosa
1996	Itataya Ko ang Buhay Ko	Edmond's mother
1997	Ipaglaban Mo: The Movie II	Mrs. Agoncillo (Episode 1)
1999	Bayad Puri	Mrs. Verzosa

=== Television ===
Year	Title	Role	Remarks
1987–1989	Coney Reyes on Camera		Episode: "May Langit Din ang Inaapi"
1987	Trianggulo		Film on television
1987–1989	Okay Ka, Fairy Ko!	Ina Magenta	
1989–1995	Okay Ka, Fairy Ko!	Ina Magenta	
1995–1997	Okay Ka, Fairy Ko!	Ina Magenta	
1990–1996	Lovingly Yours, Helen		
1991	Maalaala Mo Kaya		Episode: "Trahedya"; first MMK appearance
1992–1997	The Maricel Drama Special	Various	
1996–1999	Tierra Sangre		
1996	Calvento Files	Various	Episode 31: "You Are Never Safe"
1996	Calvento Files	Various	Episode 40: "Madam Auring: Misfortunes of a Fortune Teller"
1997	Maalaala Mo Kaya		Episode: "Bituin"
1997	Maalaala Mo Kaya		Episode: "Visa"
1997–1998	Mula sa Puso		Last teleserye appearance
1998	GMA Telecine Specials		Episode: "Iguhit Mo sa Alaala"; last television film appearance

== Accolades ==
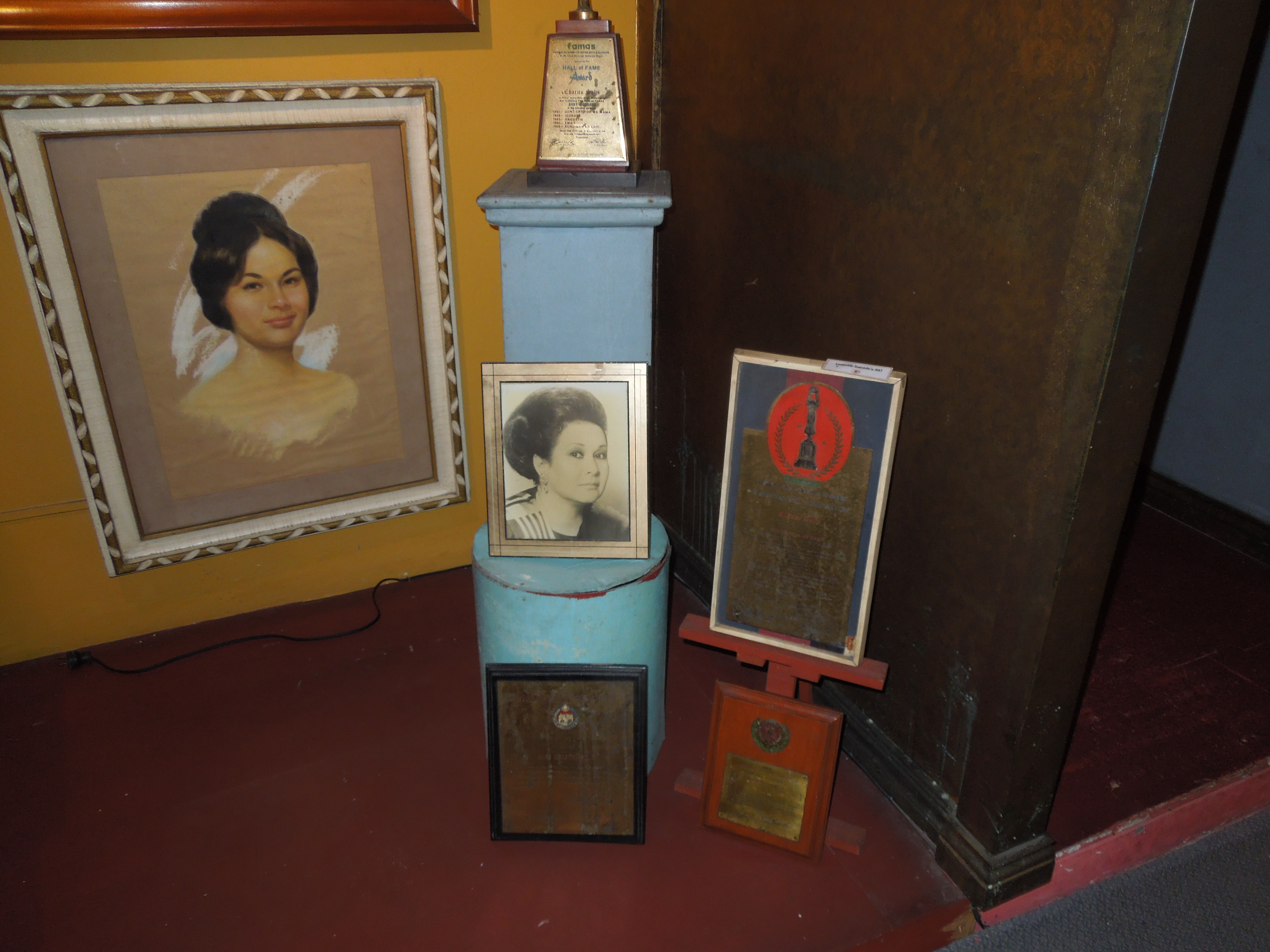
Portraits and accolades of Solis displayed at the Mowelfund museum.

Awards and nominations received by Charito Solis
Organizations	Year (Note: Indicates the year of ceremony. Each year is linked to the article about the awards held that year, wherever possible.)	Recipient(s)	Category	Result	Ref.
Asian Film Festival Awards	1958	Malvarosa	Best Actress	Nominated	
Asian Film Festival Awards	1967	Dahil sa Isang Bulaklak	Best Actress	Won	
Eastwood City Walk of Fame	2006	Charito Solis	Inductee	Won	
FAMAS Awards	1957	Ulilang Bituin	Best Actress	Nominated	
FAMAS Awards	1958	Krisalis	Best Actress	Nominated	
FAMAS Awards	1960	Kundiman ng Lahi	Best Actress	Won	
FAMAS Awards	1961	Emily	Best Actress	Won	
FAMAS Awards	1963	El Filibusterismo	Best Actress	Nominated	
FAMAS Awards	1964	Angustia	Best Actress	Won	
FAMAS Awards	1964	Tatlong Mukha ni Pandora	Best Actress	Nominated	
FAMAS Awards	1965	Lagablab sa Maribojoc	Best Actress	Nominated	
FAMAS Awards	1967	Claudia	Best Actress	Nominated	
FAMAS Awards	1968	Dahil sa Isang Bulaklak	Best Actress	Nominated	
FAMAS Awards	1969	Igorota	Best Actress	Won	
FAMAS Awards	1969	Charito Solis	Ciriaco Santiago Memorial Award	Won	
FAMAS Awards	1970	Ang Pulubi	Best Actress	Nominated	
FAMAS Awards	1976	Araw-araw, Gabi-gabi	Best Actress	Nominated	
FAMAS Awards	1978	Ina, Kapatid, Anak	Best Actress	Nominated	
FAMAS Awards	1982	Kisapmata	Best Supporting Actress	Nominated	
FAMAS Awards	1984	Don't Cry for Me, Papa	Best Actress	Won	
FAMAS Awards	1985	Charito Solis	Hall of Fame for Best Actress	Won	
FAMAS Awards	1986	Moises Padilla Story: The Missing Chapter	Best Supporting Actress	Nominated	
Gawad Urian	1980	Ina, Kapatid, Anak	Best Actress	Won	
Gawad Urian	1982	Playgirl	Best Actress	Nominated	
Gawad Urian	1982	Kisapmata	Best Supporting Actress	Won	
Gawad Urian	1984	Karnal	Best Supporting Actress	Won	
Gawad Urian	1986	Hinugot sa Langit	Best Supporting Actress	Nominated	
Luna Awards	1984	Karnal	Best Supporting Actress	Won	
Manila Film Festival	1969	Ang Pulubi	Best Actress	Won	
Metro Manila Film Festival	1975	Araw-araw, Gabi-gabi	Best Actress	Won	
Metro Manila Film Festival	1981	Kisapmata	Best Supporting Actress	Won	
Metro Manila Film Festival	1997	Charito Solis	Cinema's Living Treasures	Won	
Star Awards for Movies	1997	Charito Solis	Ulirang Artista Award	Won	

== See also ==
- List of Filipino actresses
- Cinema of the Philippines
- Television in the Philippines
- Golden Age of Philippine cinema
