= Batch '81 =

1982 psychological drama film by Mike de Leon

- Directed by: Mike de Leon
- Written by: Mike de Leon; Clodualdo del Mundo Jr.; Raquel Villavicencio
- Produced by: Marichu Maceda
- Starring: Mark Gil
- Cinematography: Rody Lacap
- Edited by: Jess Navarro
- Music by: Lorrie Ilustre
- Production company: MVP Pictures
- Distributed by: LVN Pictures; Sampaguita Pictures
- Release date: November 18, 1982
- Running time: 100 minutes
- Country: Philippines
- Languages: Filipino; English

Alpha Kappa Omega Batch '81 (also known as Batch '81 or ΑΚΩ 81) is a 1982 Filipino psychological drama film directed by Mike de Leon from a screenplay he co-written with Clodualdo del Mundo Jr. and Raquel Villavicencio. The film depicts the titular fraternity's harsh initiation of new batch members as seen through the eyes of pre-med student Sid Lucero, played by Mark Gil in what is generally recognized as his breakout role.

The film premiered at the 1982 Cannes Film Festival during the Directors' Fortnight, screened alongside de Leon's 1981 film Kisapmata. The Manunuri ng Pelikulang Pilipino (Filipino Film Critics) included it on their list of the Ten Best Films of the Decade. In 2017, the film was digitally restored as part of the Venice Classics section.

== Plot ==
Sid Lucero (Mark Gil), a university student, is pushed by his mother to take up zoology so that he may later go on to medical school. He is attracted to the prospect of joining Alpha Kappa Omega, also called AKO, one of the most prominent of the school's Greek-letter organizations.

Sid is one of the fraternity's fifteen initial applicants, but only eight make it into AKO's six-month initiation program, which is overseen by the fraternity seniors, called "masters" by the neophytes. The fraternity leader, Vince (Jimmy Javier), orients the pledge batch in the ways of the group before submitting them to their first hazing.

Over the succeeding months, the fraternity masters submit the neophytes to a series of tests: Pacoy Ledesma (Ward Luarca) has sex with Jenny Estrada (Chanda Romero), a prostitute, which is recorded and shown to the group. The group is made to run in public in nothing but their underwear and sneakers. Ronnie (Ricky Sandico) is made to drink beer laced with his batchmates' spit at a birthday party. A doctor, who is an AKO alumnus, attaches surgical equipment to Sid as a pain-tolerance experience. Sid's love interest, Mariel (Bing Pimentel), expresses concern for his safety, revealing that she lost her brother in a frat initiation rite two years before.

The physical and psychological pressure takes its toll on neophytes Arni (Rod Leido) and Ronnie, both of whom decide to leave. When senior Vince discovers this, he has Ronnie tied to an electric chair for the rest of the batch to witness. Ronnie's father (Chito Ponce Enrile), an AKO alum, oversees the session as his son is given electric shocks by his batch mates. As the voltage is set higher, much to the discomfort of the young men, Ronnie's father orders the session to continue and the neophytes obey. Pacoy notices that Ronnie is no longer responding to the questions and believes him to have died. When Ronnie suddenly wakes up, his father explains that the session was set up to test whether the neophytes would trust their masters. Ronnie decides to continue with the initiation, much to the delight of his batch.

At the university's inter-fraternity talent show, Upakan, the AKO neophytes perform a drag rendition of songs from the musical Cabaret, with Sid dressed as Sally Bowles. The rival fraternity Sigma Omicron Sigma (SOS) performs an original rock composition.

After the show, Sid, Arni, and Arni's girlfriend, Tina (Sandy Andolong), are waylaid by members of SOS. Their leader, Tina's brother Abet (Mike Arvisu), makes good on his earlier threats to stop Arni from dating his sister, drowning Arni as Sid watches. Now committed to avenging Arni's death, Sid asks AKO leader Vince to retaliate. The two fraternities break their truce and decide to settle everything in a street brawl. Ronnie is killed by an SOS member, who falls to a cleaver strike by AKO neophyte Gonzalez (Vic Lima). Gonzalez and Sid work together to kill Abet, but Gonzalez dies in the process.

After one last hazing at a beach, the remaining neophytes, including Sid, are officially welcomed into the fraternity. The closing voice-over by Sid reveals that he eventually becomes one of the AKO masters overseeing the initiation program of another batch of neophytes.

== Cast ==
- Mark Gil as Isidro "Sid" Lucero
- Sandy Andolong as Tina
- Ward Luarca as Pacoy Ledesma
- Noel Trinidad as Prof. Santi Santillan
- Ricky Sandico as Ronnie Roxas, Jr.
- Jimmy Javier as Vince
- Rod Leido as Arni Enriquez
- Bing Pimentel as Mariel
- Dang Cecilio (credited as Criselda Cecilio) as Pearl
- Mike Arvisu as Abet
- Vic Lima as Gonzalez
- Dodo Cabasal as Pete Magtibay
- Edwin Reyes as Ding Quintos
- Nanette Inventor as Miss Casuso
- Joe Jardi as Dick
- Ed Trinidad as King
- Joseph Olfindo as Vergara
- Charito Solis as Arni's Mother
- Chanda Romero as Jenny Estrada
- Johnny Delgado as AKO Frat Doctor
- Armida Siguion-Reyna as Lilia Lucero (Sid's mother)
- Chito Ponce Enrile as Ronnie's Father
- Ronnie Portugal as AKO Member
- Gilbert Serrano as AKO Member
- Buddy Sta. Juana as AKO Member
- Gerry Perez as AKO Member
- Audie Gemora as Upakan '81 Emcee
- Dick Alcaraz as AKO Neophyte Quitter
- Peping Almojuela as Student Ramos

== Production ==
=== Development ===
I wasn't so much interested in the torture–the pulling out of nails, the senseless beatings–but in the possibilities of mental torture, of psychological torture. The project went under the initial title of Frat, and I compiled ten cassette tapes of interviews with frat members.

— Mike de Leon in a 1982 interview with critic Agustin Sotto

Producer Marichu Maceda of MVP Pictures approached Mike de Leon to direct a film for her. At that point, de Leon had directed three films, including his directorial debut Itim, and was also known for his cinematography work on Lino Brocka's Manila in the Claws of Light and Eddie Romero's Aguila. After meeting Maceda, de Leon reached out to screenwriters Clodualdo del Mundo Jr. and Raquel Villavicencio, both of whom he had previously worked with on Kakabakaba Ka Ba? They proposed a story that would explore the educational system in relation to contemporary society. Maceda and de Leon gave different accounts of the inspiration for the film: Maceda said the idea came to her after her son had been beaten up by his would-be fraternity brothers, while de Leon said that he came across the culture of an underground university brotherhood via a personal friend.

According to del Mundo, some of the material for the film came from interviews with "informants" of Upsilon Sigma Phi, a fraternity based in the University of the Philippines.

=== Casting ===
A casting call was announced for the film and by December 1980 there was a shortlist for all parts except for Sid Lucero, the narrator, as de Leon did not want the role to be played by a newcomer. Producer Maceda was initially interested in casting Christopher de Leon. However, director de Leon had found the young actor difficult to work with on the set of his previous film, Kakabakaba Ka Ba?. In the end, Mark Gil, a then-up-and-coming actor with a reputation for being a serious performer, was chosen for the role.

Before filming began, a ten-day acting workshop was held at the residence of Maceda. It was attended by those on the shortlist, as well as established actors such as Charo Santos and Jay Ilagan, both of whom had previously worked with de Leon on Kakabakaba Ka Ba? and who would work with the director again on Kisapmata. Actress Alma Moreno was in attendance, having been considered for the role of Tina, but she ultimately lost out to Sandy Andolong.

Sid Lucero, the child of Gil and his Batch '81 co-star Bing Pimentel, credits the film as "that movie was where my dad met my mom" adding he "would not have been made if not for that movie." Lucero, born a year after the film was released, and whose real name is Timothy Pimentel Eigenmann, took his stage name from his father's character in the film.

=== Filming ===
Principal photography began in February 1981, starting with the initiation scene. In order to avoid having to get permission to film on an actual school campus, the Sampaguita Pictures lot and the LVN Pictures compound were used as filming locations. The dorm scenes were filmed at the dorm of the Sampaguita contract players, while the initiation scene was shot in the basement of the Maceda residence. Nevertheless, some scenes were shot on actual school campuses: the opening sequence was filmed at Ateneo de Manila University, while the inter-fraternity talent show was filmed at Colegio San Agustin.

Several months into shooting, production on Batch '81 came to a halt as Maceda's other film, the Vilma Santos-headlined Pakawalan Mo Ako, was behind schedule and eating up their financing. During the three-month hiatus, de Leon and his creative team made the psychological horror film Kisapmata. Shooting resumed after Maceda was able to raise more funds. By August 1981, principal photography was completed.

The song used during the graduation of the fraternity is the Latin hymn "Gaudeamus igitur," which de Leon first heard from the 1954 MGM musical film The Student Prince.

=== Post-production ===
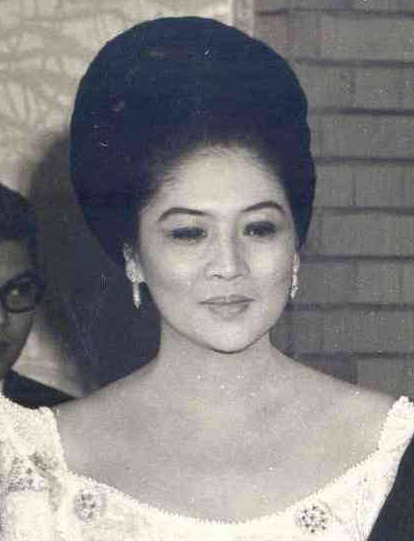
A filmed musical number of "Don't Cry For Me Argentina" was admitted by director Mike de Leon to be a reference to First Lady Imelda Marcos (pictured above). The scene was cut in post-production.

A scene was filmed where Miss Casuso, played by Nanette Inventor, performs a disco rendition of "Don't Cry For Me Argentina" from the musical Evita, which was intended to be part of the musical performance at the inter-fraternity talent show. De Leon admitted that this was a reference to First Lady Imelda Marcos. At the time, the Marcos regime "orally banned" Evita due to comparisons between Imelda and Eva Perón, the former First Lady of Argentina and the subject of Evita. Although there was never a formal ban by the government on the productions of Evita, permission to produce the musical was orally denied or discouraged by members of the first family, namely Imelda and her daughter Imee. As such, de Leon was told by Maceda, who was a personal friend of Imelda, to choose between keeping the disco number or the Martial Law question asked during the electroshock scene. Although de Leon chose to keep the latter, the question was ultimately cut by Philippine censors before its Philippine theatrical release. The removal of the "Don't Cry For Me Argentina" number also prompted de Leon to cut out the story arc of Inventor's character, limiting her role to the opening scene.

Navarro's editing of the film is recognized as his first notable work; he also edited de Leon's Kisapmata, Ishmael Bernal's Broken Marriage, and Peque Gallaga's Oro, Plata, Mata.

== Themes and allusions ==
The film is generally viewed as an allegory of the martial law era of President Ferdinand Marcos, the microcosm of the fraternity mirroring the macrocosm of Philippine society at the time. In the context of the national discourse of the period, film scholar Patrick Campos writes that "by the film's end, one would have witnessed the characteristic violence that attends fascism, blind obedience, and irrational conformity." Director Mike de Leon, on the occasion of the premier of the digitally restored version of the film, recounted:

[The film was made] during a time of great political unrest and turmoil, when [the Philippines] was under the [tyranny] of history's most infamous conjugal dictatorship, Ferdinand and Imelda Marcos. Batch '81 and Sister Stella L. reflected those times in exploring the creation of the fascist mindset, as exemplified by activist nuns and school fraternities.

=== Musical performance ===
The anarchists tear apart a dummy in the course of their song. They are always challenging other frats to rumbles. I had the Fascists perform songs from Cabaret as I thought the female impersonation bit stresses the fact that they have changed into other human beings.

— Mike de Leon in a 1982 interview with critic Agustin Sotto

De Leon has said that the film is meant to depict two types of fraternities: the AKO fraternity following the philosophy of the fascists, while the SOS fraternity is more akin to anarchists. This is best realized in the performances of the fraternities at the inter-fraternity talent show. The AKO fraternity performs in drag songs from the Nazi Germany-set musical Cabaret. Meanwhile, the SOS fraternity, dressed as Alex and his droogs from Stanley Kubrick's A Clockwork Orange, perform an original rock composition "Upakan '81" while attacking a life-sized dummy. The detail of the dummy being beaten up was cut by the Board of Censors for Motion Pictures for the original Philippine theatrical release.

=== Electroshock scene ===
Illustration of the set-up of a Milgram experiment. The experimenter (E) convinces the subject (T) to give what he believes are painful electric shocks to another subject, who is actually an actor (L). The Milgram experiment inspired the electroshock scene of the film.

In one scene, Ronnie, one of the neophytes, is strapped into a chair. The masters command the other neophytes to ask Ronnie true-or-false questions and then press a button to give him an electric shock. Ronnie's father, an alumnus of the fraternity, is present as well, and he asks, "Martial Law bettered the lives of Filipinos, right or wrong?" The question about the impact of Martial Law was cut by the Board of Censors for Motion Pictures for the original Philippine theatrical release. Critic Nicanor Tiongson referred to the line and its censorship in an article for Philippine Panorama as "one of the few and essential lines that situate the film in a macro-level of significance." Among de Leon's early films, namely Kakabakaba Ka Ba?, Kisapmata, Batch '81, and Sister Stella L., which all delve into sociopolitical themes, only the electroshock scene can be seen as directly implicating the Marcos regime. De Leon has also noted the "irony" of the scene given that Ronnie's father is played by Chito Ponce Enrile, the brother of President Marcos' Defense Minister Juan Ponce Enrile.

The scene was based on the psychological Milgram experiment as de Leon wanted to demonstrate "that people will obey authority even if the consequences are serious as long as someone would take responsibility for their actions".

Ray Privett, writing for Film Comment, found that the electroshock scene reminded him of the Ludovico treatment in A Clockwork Orange, a film referenced in the SOS fraternity rock number. Similarly, Noel Vera, film critic for BusinessWorld, refers to Batch '81 as "de Leon's Clockwork Orange." Beyond the overt reference during the rock number, Vera writes, "specific events are mirrored (a head dunked in a tank of filthy water; a man strapped to a chair; one film beginning with a gang rumble, the other ending with same), crucial themes echoed ("What's your decision?" recalling Clockwork's onscreen query: "What's it going to be then, eh?" – both films focusing on the primacy and degradation of free will)."

== Release ==
The film premiered at the 1982 Cannes Film Festival during the Directors' Fortnight, alongside de Leon's Kisapmata. The invitation to Cannes came after Pierre-Henri Deleau, a festival organizer who had previously brought three of Lina Brocka's films to Cannes, met de Leon at the 7th Metro Manila Film Festival, where Kisapmata had swept the festival awards. In November 1982, a censored version of the film was shown in the Philippines. In attendance was presidential daughter Imee Marcos, who, according to producer Marichu Maceda, enjoyed the film.

=== Censorship ===
Before its Philippine premier, Batch '81 was subjected to censorship that Mario A. Hernando of Who Magazine described as "brutality [...] which could be matched only by those found in the uncensored film." The scenes cut from the theatrical release were the pointed question about the impact of Martial Law during the electroshock scene, several cuts of the SOS performance when they are beating up a life-sized dummy, and the violent warehouse fight towards the end of the film.

=== Restoration ===
In 2016, the Asian Film Archive reached out to Mike de Leon with a proposal to digitally restore Batch '81 and his 1984 film Sister Stella L. De Leon had entrusted the uncut, original prints of the film to the Asian Film Archive, alongside the prints of his other pictures. The restoration itself was done by L'Immagine Ritrovata, the same film lab that de Leon worked with for the restoration of Lina Brocka's Manila in the Claws of Light and Lamberto V. Avellana's Portrait of the Artist as a Filipino. The color grading was done by Wildsound Studio, with de Leon and cinematographer Rody Lacap supervising.

On September 5, 2017, the digitally restored version of the film premiered at the 74th Venice International Film Festival as part of the Venice Classics section. De Leon prepared a speech, which was read by Tee Pao Chew of the Asian Film Archive, about martial law under President Marcos, as well as the contemporary political climate of the Philippines, saying:

That [it] still resonates in my country is concerning, although in some ways expected. Sadly, it seems that incipient dictatorship is again rearing its ugly head. In this environment, extrajudicial killings continue unabated under the guise of a war against illegal drugs, the Constitution and rule of law are blatantly disregarded, political leaders and even Supreme Court justices are cowed into submission and a professional army of social media trolls viciously attacks online dissent. History is being blatantly rewritten and the martyrdom of countless martial law victims is denigrated as stupidity and a dictator is given a hero's burial in the dead of the night. In this situation, what can one film do? Nothing much ... in fact, very little. But there are still countless Filipinos who share my apprehension and are not afraid to speak out. We will not allow our country to be dragged back to those dark times—a situation best described by the blurb on the film's original poster: 'A secret world where freedom is obedience, and authority is violence.' Only this time, this world of unbridled brutality is no longer a secret.

It was also screened at the 15th MoMA International Festival of Film Preservation at the Museum of Modern Art in New York. The restored version had its Philippine premiere at Trinoma mall as the closing film of the 2017 QCinema International Film Festival.

== Reception ==
Upon release, the film received positive reviews. Isagani Cruz, writing for Philippine Panorama, said "simply put, Batch '81 is one of the greatest Filipino films ever made." Bienvenido Lumbera of the Philippine Daily Express found it "a rare product of the Filipino film industry, polished, accomplished, disturbing, and, above all, intelligent." In a more muted review, however, Joel David noted that "more time is spent on the depiction of initiation rites than on lead character Sid Lucero's motive for membership at all costs, when it fact it is his obsession that leads to an escalation of the level of violence in the neophytes' experience."

=== Accolades ===
Year	Award	Category	Nominee(s)	Result
1982	Chicago Film Festival	Best Film (Gold Hugo)	Batch '81	Nominated
1983	FAP Awards	Best Picture	Batch '81	Won
1983	FAP Awards	Best Original Screenplay	Clodualdo del Mundo Jr. and Raquel Villavicencio	Won
1983	Gawad Urian Awards	Best Picture (Pinakamahusay na Pelikula)	Batch '81	Nominated
1983	Gawad Urian Awards	Best Direction (Pinakamahusay na Direksyon)	Mike de Leon	Nominated
1983	Gawad Urian Awards	Best Actor (Pinakamahusay na Pangunahing Aktor)	Mark Gil	Nominated
1983	Gawad Urian Awards	Best Supporting Actor (Pinakamahusay na Pangalawang Aktor)	Jimmy Javier	Nominated
1983	Gawad Urian Awards	Best Screenplay (Pinakamahusay na Dulang Pampelikula)	Mike De Leon, Clodualdo del Mundo Jr., and Raquel Villavicencio	Won
1983	Gawad Urian Awards	Best Editing (Pinakamahusay na Editing)	Jess Navaro	Won
1983	Gawad Urian Awards	Best Cinematography (Pinakamahusay na Sinematograpiya)	Rody Lacap	Nominated
1983	Gawad Urian Awards	Best Production Design (Pinakamahusay na Disenyong Pamproduksiyon)	Cesar Hernando	Nominated
1983	Gawad Urian Awards	Best Music (Pinakamahusay na Musika)	Lorrie Ilustre	Nominated
1983	Gawad Urian Awards	Best Sound (Pinakamahusay na Tunog)	Ramon Reyes	Nominated

== Adaptations ==
In 2019, for its 40th season, Tanghalang Ateneo, the student theater company of the Ateneo de Manila University, staged an adaptation of the film. The adaptation was written and directed by Guelan Luarca, the son of Ward Luarca, who plays one of the neophytes in the film. The playwright Luarca transported the story to a contemporary setting, including references to social media, allowing the play to serve as a commentary on the current state of the country.
