= 1981 Metro Manila Film Festival =

Annual Philippine Festival edition

- Date: December 25, 1981 to January 3, 1982
- Site: Manila

Highlights
- Best Picture: Kisapmata
- Most awards: Kisapmata (10)

The 7th Metro Manila Film Festival was held in 1981.

Bancom Audiovision's Kisapmata, a movie about a deranged retired policeman, won ten of the thirteen awards in the 1981 Metro Manila Film Festival including the Best Picture, Best Director for Mike de Leon, and Best Actor for Vic Silayan and among others. Vilma Santos was named Best Actress for her role in Sining Silangan's Karma.

FPJ Productions' Pagbabalik ng Panday was the top grosser of the festival.

== Entries ==
Title	Starring	Studio	Director	Genre
Ang Babae sa Ulog	Ricky Belmonte, Jean Saburit, Maria Victoria, Yasmin Ayesa, Alan Bautista, Karen Lopez	Baby Pascual Films & Associates	Ed Palmos	Drama
Indio	Dante Varona, Chiqui Hollmann, Lirio Vital, Romy Diaz, Subas Herrero, Rodolfo 'Boy' Garcia, Odette Khan, Dave Brodett	Lea Productions	Carlo J. Caparas	Action
Init O' Lamig	Charito Solis, Dindo Fernando, Elizabeth Oropesa, Chanda Romero, Gina Alajar	Cinex Films & F. Puzon Film Enterprises	Eddie Rodriguez	Drama
Kamlon	Ramon Revilla, Anthony Alonzo, Isabel Rivas, Rosemarie de Vera, Eddie Garcia, George Estregan, Nick Romano, Arnold Mendoza, Laarni Enriquez	Imus Productions	Jose Yandoc	Biography, Action
Kapitan Kidlat	Elizabeth Oropesa, Chanda Romero, Celia Rodriguez, Dranreb Belleza, Michael de Mesa, Rio Locsin, Carlo Gabriel	Premiere Productions	Emmanuel Borlaza	Action, Fantasy, Superhero
Karma	Vilma Santos, Ronaldo Valdez, Chanda Romero, Tommy Abuel	Sining Silangan	Danny Zialcita	Romance, Drama
Kisapmata	Vic Silayan, Jay Ilagan, Charo Santos, Charito Solis	Bancom Audiovision	Mike de Leon	Psychological Horror
Pagbabalik ng Panday	Fernando Poe, Jr., Tina Revilla, Bentot, Jr., Rosemarie Gil, Lito Anzures, Jose Romulo, Lilian Laing, Max Alvarado	FPJ Productions	Ronwaldo Reyes	Action, Adventure, Fantasy, Horror
Rock n' Roll	Nora Aunor, Lloyd Samartino, Mark Gil, Ricky Davao	NV Productions & Annie Batungbakal Productions	Maryo J. de los Reyes	Family, Music
Tropang Bulilit	Niño Muhlach, Sheryl Cruz, Andrea Bautista, Janice de Belen, Lea Salonga, Donna Villa, Lloyd Samartino, Manny Luna	D'Wonder Films	J. Erastheo Navoa	Comedy, Drama, Family

== Winners and nominees ==
=== Awards ===
Winners are listed first, highlighted with boldface and indicated with a double dagger (‡). Nominees are also listed if applicable.

Best Film	Best Director
**Kisapmata - Bancom Audiovision**‡; Ang Babae Sa Ulog	**Mike De Leon – Kisapmata**‡
Best Actor	Best Actress
**Vic Silayan – Kisapmata**‡	**Vilma Santos – Karma**‡
Best Supporting Actor	Best Supporting Actress
**Jay Ilagan – Kisapmata**‡	**Charito Solis – Kisapmata**‡
Best Sound Engineering	Best Cinematography
**Kisapmata**‡	**Ver Reyes – Ang Pagbabalik ng Panday**‡
Best Child Performer	Best Story
**Bentot, Jr. – Ang Pagbabalik ng Panday** ‡ and; **Dranreb Belleza – Kapitan Kidlat**‡	**Clodualdo del Mundo, Jr., Raquel Villavicencio, and Mike De Leon – Kisapmata**‡
Best Screenplay	Best Editing
**Clodualdo del Mundo, Jr., Raquel Villavicencio, and Mike De Leon – Kisapmata**‡	**Jess Navarro and Ben Pelayo – Kisapmata**‡
Best Art Direction
**Kisapmata**‡

== Multiple awards ==
Awards	Film
10	Kisapmata
2	Ang Pagbabalik ng Panday

Preceded by 1980 Metro Manila Film Festival	Metro Manila Film Festival; 1981	Succeeded by 1982 Metro Manila Film Festival
