= Malvarosa =

1958 film directed by Gregorio Fernandez

- Re-release poster
- Directed by: Dr. Gregorio Fernandez
- Screenplay by: Consuelo P. Osorio
- Story by: Clodualdo del Mundo
- Produced by: Narcisa de León
- Starring: Charito Solis; Leroy Salvador; Vic Silayan; Rey Ruiz; Carlos Padilla Jr.; Vic Diaz; Rebecca Del Rio
- Cinematography: Mike Accion
- Edited by: Enrique Jarlego
- Music by: Francisco Buencamino Jr.; LVN Symphony Orchestra
- Production company: LVN Pictures (Note: The film's ownership rights is currently handled by ABS-CBN Corporation but the LVN Pictures copyright is retained.)
- Release date: May 19, 1958
- Running time: 101 minutes
- Country: Philippines
- Language: Filipino

Malvarosa is a 1958 Filipino family melodrama film directed by Dr. Gregorio Fernandez from a screenplay by Consuelo P. Osorio, based on a comic serial of the same name (serialized via Espesyal Komiks) written by Clodualdo del Mundo Sr. The film tells the story of a poverty-stricken nuclear family living on the nearby railroad tracks whose members carry their burdens that need to be resolved. It stars Charito Solis, Vic Silayan, Carlos Padilla Jr., Vic Diaz, Rey Ruiz, and Eddie Rodriguez as the children of Rebecca del Rio's character, Sinforosa, and Leroy Salvador as Candido, Rosa's fiancé.

Produced and released by LVN Pictures, the film was theatrically released on May 19, 1958. In 2019, the film was digitally scanned and restored by ABS-CBN Film Restoration.

== Plot ==
Rosa, a beautiful young woman, lives in the slums at the nearby railroad tracks with her mother and five older brothers. By the time her alcoholic father died in a train accident, her mother Sinforosa felt guilt and depression as she became widowed. A few years later, she is going to marry his fiancé Candido but she has to deal with the problems first that their family faces despite poverty, especially Rosa's brothers who also carry their burdens which makes Rosa stressed to have a solution as well as their confrontations. It would also tell the lives of Melanio, the eldest and an obnoxious womanizer; followed by Alberto, a man with a mean reputation to his family; Leonides, a violent man who became notorious for his crimes throughout the neighborhood; Vedasto, a scheming man whom he persuaded his sister to work with a wealthy man; and lastly, Avelino, a patient and responsible man whom he trusts his sister to eliminate their family's burden. Rosa also witnessed some of the misfortunes that happened in their family.

== Cast ==
- Charito Solis as Rosa
- Vic Silayan as Melanio
- Carlos Padilla Jr. as Alberto
- Vic Diaz as Leonides
- Rey Ruiz as Vedasto
- Eddie Rodriguez as Avelino
- Leroy Salvador as Candido
- Rebecca del Rio as Sinforosa
- Linda Roxas as Miling
- Johnny Reyes as Tony
- Priscilla Ramirez as Aling Ipang
- Ramon Olmos as Damian
- Nita Ramos as Linda
- Caridad Sanchez as Melanio's Woman #1
- Perla Bautista as Melanio's Woman #2

== Production ==
During the shooting of the film, the director and its staff cooperated with the Philippine Constabulary and the Manila Railroad Company for their participation in the important scenes of the film as well as their permission to their facilities and staff.

== Release ==
The film was released on May 19, 1958, at the Dalisay Theatre in Manila, Philippines.

=== Digital restoration ===
The film was restored by ABS-CBN Film Restoration Project, using the equipment of the film archives division. The restoration began with digital scanning of frames in 4K resolution with the use of the 35mm print from the collection of LVN Pictures' library that was stored at the basement of ABS-CBN's corporate headquarters, ELJ Communications Center, in Diliman, Quezon City. After the scanning, it was restored in 2K resolution and took 80 hours to eliminate the image impairments including scratches and unstable images as well as color adjustments to make it very identical to its original brightness and contrast.

“The restoration of “Malvarosa” and “Biyaya ng Lupa” using ABS-CBN’s own facilities is a milestone that we are proud of,”

— Leo Katigbak, head of ABS-CBN Film Restoration, QCinema International Film Festival; October 17, 2019

The digitally scanned and restored 4K version was premiered on October 17, 2019, at the Gateway Mall - Cinema 7 as part of the QCinema International Film Festival 2019. It was attended by Caridad Sanchez and the representatives of the film's cast and crew including screenwriter Clodualdo "Doy" del Mundo Jr. (representing his father), actor Rap Fernandez (representing his grandfather), Jesus Hofileña (representing Vic Silayan), and actress-singer Zsa Zsa Padilla and her daughter Zia Quizon (representing their father and grandfather, respectively).

The 4K digital scan of the film was streamed online on December 1, 2020, through ABS-CBN Film Restoration's Facebook page.
