= Itim =

1976 Philippine supernatural horror drama film

- Theatrical release poster
- Directed by: Mike de Leon
- Written by: Clodualdo del Mundo Jr.; Gil Quito; Ricky Lee (uncredited)
- Produced by: Severino Manotok Jr.; Ma. Teresa L. Manotok; Ruben T. del Rosario
- Starring: Tommy Abuel; Mario Montenegro; Charo Santos
- Cinematography: Rody Lacap; Ely Cruz
- Edited by: Ike Jarlego Jr.
- Music by: Max Jocson
- Production company: Cinema Artists Philippines
- Release date: 1976
- Running time: 105 minutes
- Country: Philippines
- Language: Filipino

Itim (Filipino: Black), released overseas as The Rites of May, is a 1976 Philippine gothic supernatural horror film directed by Mike de Leon in his feature film directorial debut, from a screenplay written by Clodualdo del Mundo Jr. and Gil Quito. It stars Tommy Abuel, Mario Montenegro, and Charo Santos in her acting debut, and follows a young photographer who encounters a mysterious woman whilst visiting his father in San Ildefonso during Lent.

Itim addresses the topics of occultism and religion in a "foray into gothic horror, exploring the spiritual nature of life and people in the quiet little town of San Ildefonso". The Association of Filipino Film Critics included the film on their list of the 10 Best Films of the 1970s. The film was digitally restored in 2022, with a subsequent theatrical premiere as part of the Cannes Classics section at the 75th Cannes Film Festival. In a 2022 retrospective at the Museum of Modern Art, the film was described as "one of the most remarkable debuts in cinema history".

== Plot ==
During a séance, an espiritista (medium) exclaims that Rosa, a missing Catholic nun, is dead. Her younger sister, Teresa, is uneasy. Their mother asks the espiritista if she can speak to Rosa. The medium tells her to wait for Good Friday.

Meanwhile, Jun, a young photographer from Manila, is visiting his father, Dr. Torres, who is unable to walk or talk, in San Ildefonso during Holy Week. Throughout his visit, Jun photographs various Lenten rituals for the Manila-based magazine he works for.

He comes across Teresa and takes her photograph while she is dazed. Following this are several chance encounters where she exhibits strange behaviors she does not seem to have control over. Soon, however, they discover that it was not chance but the supernatural that brought them together. In the clinic of his father, Jun finds a film negative; he develops it and sees it is a photo of his father and a young woman, who he soon learns is Rosa.

It is revealed in another séance that the spirit of Rosa possesses Teresa. Rosa's spirit lets out that she was having an affair with Dr. Torres, who forced her to have an abortion, resulting in her death. Soon after the incident, Dr. Torres was involved in a car accident that left him mute and paralyzed. After revealing what happened, Rosa exacts her revenge, causing Dr. Torres to fall down the stairs and die.

== Cast ==
- Tommy Abuel as Jun
- Mario Montenegro as Dr. Torres
- Mona Lisa as Aling Pining
- Charo Santos as Teresa
- Sarah Joaquin as Aling Angelina
- Susan Valdez as Rosa
- Moody Diaz as Aling Bebeng

== Production ==
=== Development ===
I got interested in doing a film that used a camera to tell a story with one character, no dialogue and just sound effects. One thing I liked about Blow-up was the idea of existential alienation. Monologo was a ghost story. The character takes photos and he does not realize that he has photographed a ghost or a presence in his own house. I mean, his camera saw it but he did not. That kinda blew my mind.

— Mike de Leon in a 2022 interview

Originally a cinematographer, Mike de Leon was known for his award-winning work on the 1975 film Manila in the Claws of Light, which was directed by Lino Brocka. Although de Leon did not initially set out to become a director, following Manila, in 1975, he made a short film Monologo (Monologue), his second directorial effort after the 1972 short Sa Bisperas. Monologo would serve as a turning point, the experience piquing his interest in directing. Brocka, was the first person to view the rough cut of Monologo. He subsequently encouraged de Leon to pursue directing. De Leon thus later described Itim as an offshoot of Monologo.

The script of Itim was written by Clodualdo del Mundo Jr., who wrote the script of Manila, and del Mundo's brother-in-law, Gil Quito. Quito conceived of setting the film during Holy Week and incorporating spiritualism. He recalled that the script was written with relative ease, except for the ending. Spiritist Becky Gutierrez was on set as a consultant for the psychic-related elements of the film. She wrote down the incantations from her actual séances for the production team, which were then used to inform the final scene. De Leon also credits production designer Mel Chionglo for assistance in re-writing the séance scene. According to de Leon, screenwriter Ricky Lee initially worked on the script but requested not to be credited; the director believed that Lee, known then as a former student activist, made the request due to the lack of overt social relevance in Itim.

=== Casting ===
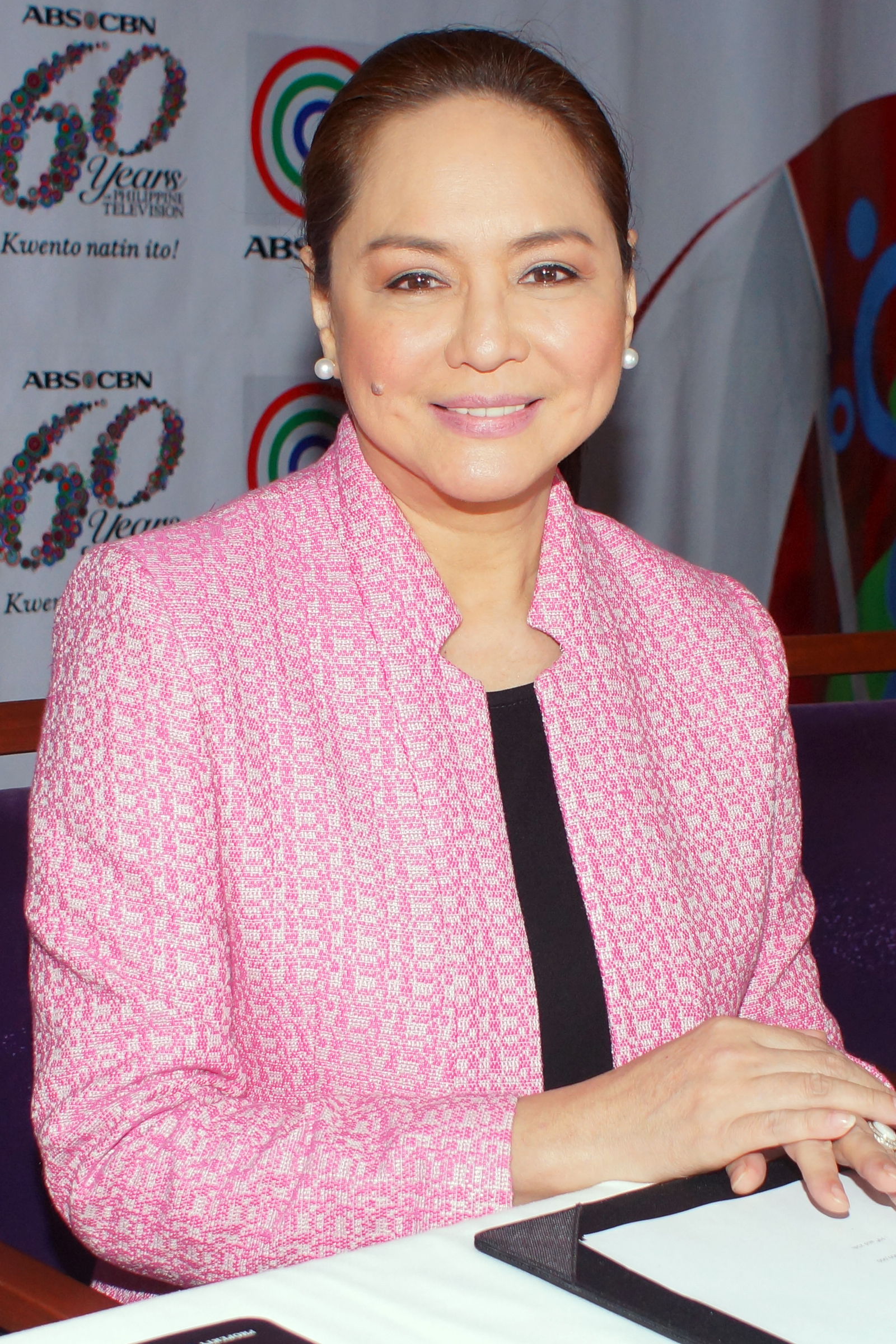
Charo Santos (pictured in 2014) made her acting debut in Itim and would later star in de Leon's films Kakabakaba Ka Ba? and Kisapmata

Initially, de Leon, as he explains in a 2022 interview, was interested in casting big-name actors, as was the common practice at the time in Indonesian film. The original idea was an erotic thriller with Alma Moreno and Bembol Roco, the latter of whom starred in Brocka's Manila. According to de Leon, after Manila, Roco committed to appear in de Leon's directorial debut but had a schedule conflict with another film he had already signed on to act in. Regarding Moreno, the director was put off when her manager demanded there be full payment upon signing the contract. Following these setbacks, de Leon asked for Brocka's assistance in casting Hilda Koronel, but her fee was beyond their budget. As a result, the production was risked on newcomers, including Charo Santos and Susan Valdez.

After winning the Baron Travel Girl beauty pageant, Santos, then a college student, was noticed by Brocka. The latter referred Santos to de Leon and a screen test was arranged. Santos was subsequently offered her first acting role. As Santos refused to do any erotic scenes, or even to kiss on screen, de Leon scrapped the original concept of an erotic thriller and instead delved into Catholic guilt through the lens of the horror genre.

The film also served as the acting debut of Susan Valdez, albeit in a non-speaking role; prior to the film, Valdez was known as a commercial model. The main role of the photographer was given to Tommy Abuel, who de Leon had worked with on Manila. Meanwhile, the more seasoned Mario Montenegro and Mona Lisa were cast due to de Leon's familiarity with them as actors of LVN Pictures, which was formerly run by de Leon's grandmother Narcisa de León. De Leon admitted that Montenegro was his favorite of the LVN actors, for his costume films, particularly a childhood favorite of his, the 1954 feature Prinsipe Teñoso.

De Leon recalled approaching Rolando Tinio, his former teacher, to discuss whether his wife, actress Ella Luansing, would play the espiritista in the film. However, Tinio turned the discussion into a criticism of Manila and the role eventually went to Sarah Joaquin.

=== Filming ===
Principal photography commenced at the ancestral home of de Leon's family in San Miguel, Bulacan over the course of two months in 1976. Since it was his family's home, built in the 1920s at his grand-mother Dona Narcisa Vda. de Leon's request, de Leon took liberties with the set production, including removing walls and moving old furniture around, much to the displeasure of his father when he visited the set. The house is the place "where more than two decades later [de Leon] would also shoot Bayaning 3rd World."

Itim is regarded as the first major production design work of Chionglo, who would later go on to be a respected director in his own right, best known for the trilogy consisting of Sibak, Burlesk King, and Twilight Dancers. On the set of Itim, Chionglo was also assigned to assist newcomer Santos as her acting coach.

The film also served as the first cinematography work of Rody Lacap, a former color grader and optical print operator at LVN Pictures. Lacap had first been hired by de Leon as a gaffer and lighting director for his short film Monologo. He would go on to be the cinematographer of several of de Leon's other films, including Kakabakaba Ka Ba?, Kisapmata, Batch '81, and Sister Stella L., as well as Peque Gallaga's Oro, Plata, Mata and Marilou Diaz-Abaya's José Rizal. Lacap was co-cinematographer with Ely Cruz, who also worked with de Leon on Monologo, and would go on to photograph Peque Gallaga's Scorpio Nights, among others.

Santos described de Leon on set as seeing "a genius in action", adding: "He storyboarded the entire movie in his head, even before the first shot. He expects perfection from everyone." There were similar recollections by Susan Valdez, who recalls how the director was "[m]eticulous in preparing a shot. He was particular about how the lighting was set up." which implied long waits from the actors on set. The more experienced Tommy Abuel also recalled that de Leon "was mainly concerned with the technical aspects of the film such as camera angles, shots, lighting, etc." De Leon himself admitted he was not an actor's director, but rather treated film acting as an element of the overall film.

=== Post-production ===
In order to achieve a bleak and moody atmosphere, de Leon used various post-production techniques that imagined the cinematography's darkness as a protagonist, including exposing the negatives twice. A tricky procedure, several negatives were ruined in the process, requiring the re-shooting of the respective scenes. The film was scored by Max Jocson, who worked with de Leon on Manila. For several scenes of Itim, Jocson scored "against picture" by having live musicians play the score while the film was being projected in real time.

== Themes ==
=== Supernatural and horror ===
In a 2022 interview, de Leon explained why he had been interested in making a film containing elements of supernatural or at least fantastic, that he had started exploring in his 1975 short film, Monologo; he stated that he considered that short to be a ghost story, a genre he related to Lafcadio Hearn's writings, which he liked very much, but also to Antonioni's 1966 film Blowup; in that film, still according to de Leon, "[t]he character takes photos and he does not realize that he has photographed a ghost or a presence in his own house. [...] his camera saw it but he did not." Regarding the categorization of Itim as a horror film, de Leon explained that he accepted it, and added that others influences included Nicholas Roeg's Don't Look Now, that he had watched "in Germany in the mid-1970s", and Jack Clayton's The Innocents, that he had found extremely "frightening" and praised greatly.

=== Catholicism and folk Catholic imaginary ===
The film is set during Holy Week, which film academic Bliss Cua Lim described as "a season in which the mundane time of everyday life intersects with a biblical temporality of sin, repentance, and redemption." The final scene occurs during Good Friday, which Lim suggested meant the story falls short of the redemption symbolized by Easter Sunday and thus "closes on the darkness of death, remorse, and frailty named in its title."

There are several allusions to Catholic rites, devotions, and images, including the uninterrupted chanting of the Pasyon; a veiled statue of the Virgin Mary; and a group of twelve life-size saint statues representing the twelve apostles of Jesus Christ. These allusions, theologist Antonio Sison contended, are presented through the lens of "folk Catholic imaginary", that blends images of Catholicism with the Filipino primal religion. As such, the séances depicted are not part of Catholic belief but "occup(y) a niche in folk Catholic practice, which does not take issue with religious syncretism." The topic is thus approached with seriousness and confers a certain religious legitimacy to the practices of spiritism, distinguishing the séances in Itim from other depictions of such scenes in horror film.

The character of Jun, the young photographer, first encounters the apostle statues when he takes photos of them as several women chant the Pasyon. The statues then appear to Jun in a dream. They surround him and then suddenly begin moving towards and circling him, alerting Jun to the heinous deed committed by his father. Sison commented: "The folk Catholic imagery recognizes the divine intervention of religious images who will use dreamscape as a means to interrupt sinful patterns in the characters' lives and make metanoia a possibility, or, at least, a promise."

=== Darkness ===
Commentators have noted that in the approach of the filmmaker religion and horror themes share the trope of darkness or blackness (Itim meaning black). A French retrospective presentation found that the typically Filipino syncretism of mysticism and Christianity is visible in the film through certain stylistic choices: "Itim shines with this singular harmony of gentleness and fear, of magical realism and spectral fantasy. [De Leon] lets the darkness take over the setting to the point of making it a character in its own right." This implied a particular use of colour that restoration enhanced. A French review of the restoration version indicated: "Often described by critics as a slow-burn, atmospheric horror, the film has the expected oppressive darkness against white compounded with unexpected dark browns and maroons in interiors against verdant backgrounds. The Italian film laboratory L'Immagine Ritrovata restored these qualities to their proper depth, soaking the viewers in a bath of voluminous, deliberate color, light, and shadow." This includes "darkness (dilim) and light (liwanag)—the selfsame words that haunt the urban protagonist of Itim from the first evening on".

=== Social justice ===
A presentation of the film at the MoMa stated that Itim expressed its director's "fears" about "the dark side" of culture in the Philippines, namely "the Spanish colonial legacies of superstition and antiscience". In 2022, de Leon commented in an interview: "One thing that made my films a little different from most other Filipino films was that they didn't focus on depicting squalor and poverty, which international festivals love in third world films. Instead, they dealt with the corruption of the Filipino middle and upper classes, the abusive patriarchal rule in the Filipino family, or the fascist training instilled in student fraternities."

The same year the director explained that "horror" had come to mean something even darker than what the fictional genre supposed, as his country was now facing not imaginary ghosts but the actual "monsters of Philippine politics", adding that the said monsters, "after a long wait in the subterranean caverns of hell, ha[d] returned to ravish and rape my country all over again. The crazy thing is that we invited them back.” A 2023 French review of the DVD version wrote that Mike de Leon used "fantasy [...] as the only way of justice for a violence that is sadly concrete and inscribed in the mores of this patriarchal society." and that the director used the invisible to figure real "monstrosities".

== Release ==
Initially released in 1976, it was made commercially available in the Philippines in 1977. The film was internationally screened for the first time in 1979 at Filmex in Los Angeles.

=== Restoration ===
Although the Asian Film Archive offered to fund the digital restoration of Itim, delays due to the COVID-19 pandemic led director Mike de Leon to fund the restoration himself. The restoration was done by L'Immagine Ritrovata, the same film lab de Leon worked with for the restoration of his films Batch '81 and Kisapmata, as well as for the restoration of Manila in the Claws of Light. The restoration used the original negatives, which had been stored at the British Film Institute since the 1970s.

On May 20, 2022, the restored version premiered at the 75th Cannes Film Festival as part of the Cannes Classics section. It was personally introduced by Cannes Delegate General Thierry Frémaux. The restored version had its Philippine premiere at the 10th QCinema International Film Festival.

In November that same year, the restored film was included in the "Mike De Leon, Self-Portrait of a Filipino Filmmaker" retrospective at the Museum of Modern Art in New York City. It was screened alongside screenwriter Clodualdo del Mundo's behind-the-scenes documentary Itim: An Exploration in Cinema. The following month, Itim was shown in another retrospective, "Mike de Leon: A Life in (Moving) Pictures" at the Three Continents Festival in Nantes, France.

=== Home media ===
In March 2023, Itim was released on Blu-ray Disc by Carlotta Films as part of a five-box set of a selection of films directed by de Leon.

== Reception ==
=== Box office ===
Itim was a commercial flop upon its initial theatrical release, running for only one week.

=== Critical response ===
Filipino film critic Pio de Castro III lauded Itim in a contemporary Times Journal review, writing that the film was enigmatic, technically excellent, and "the touchstone against which all other films of 1977 will be gauged." The Manunuri ng Pelikulang Pilipino (Filipino Film Critics) included the film on their list of the Ten Best Films of the '70s.

In 1998, after a screening at the Film Society of Lincoln Center's Walter Reader Theater, as part of a Festival of Philippine Cinema, Ray Privett highly praised the "sparse, long-take style" of the film and its soundtrack and stated that watching the film was an experience that would haunt him for some time. A retrospective review of the film calls it "an esoteric psychological drama that leans towards genre cinema". It has also been described as Leon's "horror masterpiece". In a mixed retrospective review for AsianMoviePlus, however, Don Anelli criticized the "unnecessary technical flourishes" and the "slow-burn" pace of the film, and stated that Itim was a "generally enjoyable if somewhat flawed supernatural effort".

=== Accolades ===
At the 1978 Asian Film Festival, Itim was awarded Best Picture, and Charo Santos was recognized as Best Actress. Mike de Leon's sophomore feature, Kung Mangarap Ka't Magising, as well as Eddie Romero's Ganito Kami Noon... Paano Kayo Ngayon? were also festival entries. De Leon's father, producer Manuel de Leon (although not a producer of Itim), accepted the award for Best Picture on his son's behalf. In 1956, the film Child of Sorrow, produced by Manuel de Leon, had received the same honor.

Itim also received four Gawad Urian awards: Best Cinematography, Best Music, Best Editing, and Best Sound.
