= Kisapmata =

1981 film by Mike de Leon

- Theatrical release poster
- Directed by: Mike de Leon
- Written by: Mike de Leon; Clodualdo del Mundo, Jr.; Raquel Villavicencio
- Based on: The House on Zapote Street by Quijano de Manila
- Produced by: Simon C. Ongpin; Ma. Rosario N. Santos
- Starring: Vic Silayan; Charo Santos; Jay Ilagan; Charito Solis
- Cinematography: Rody Lacap
- Edited by: Jess Navarro
- Music by: Lorrie Ilustre
- Production company: Bancom Audiovision
- Distributed by: Bancom Audiovision
- Release date: December 25, 1981
- Running time: 98 minutes
- Country: Philippines
- Languages: Filipino; Ilocano

Kisapmata (Filipino for "(in the) blink of an eye") is a 1981 Filipino psychological horror drama film directed by Mike de Leon from a screenplay he co-wrote with Clodualdo del Mundo Jr. and Raquel Villavicencio. It stars Vic Silayan, Charo Santos, Jay Ilagan, and Charito Solis. The plot was inspired by the crime reportage "The House on Zapote Street" written by Nick Joaquin. The piece chronicles the events leading to the highly publicized familicide committed by Pablo Cabading, a retired policeman.

Considered as a pioneer of the psychological horror film genre in the Philippines, its subject matter and themes, especially drawing inspirations and parallels from true crime stories, marked the first major treatment of incest in Philippine cinema, while its message has been viewed as a commentary against the patriarchy and the regime of then-President Ferdinand Marcos.

The film premiered on December 25, 1981, as one of the official entries at the 7th Metro Manila Film Festival. Despite receiving controversy upon release, the film received critical acclaim, establishing de Leon as one of the great directors of the new generation of Filipino filmmakers. The film won ten awards from the festival, including Best Film, and was subsequently screened at the 35th Cannes Film Festival during the Directors' Fortnight, alongside de Leon's Batch '81 in May 1982.

Often regarded as one of the greatest Filipino films ever made in retrospective years, the Manunuri ng Pelikulang Pilipino (Filipino Film Critics) included Kisapmata in their list of Ten Best Films of the Decade and was voted the 3rd best Filipino film of all time (behind Manila in the Claws of Light and Himala, respectively) in a 2013 poll organized by Pinoy Rebyu. In 2020, the film was digitally restored with a subsequent theatrical screening at the 34th Il Cinema Ritrovato in Bologna, Italy.

== Plot ==
Mila reluctantly tells her domineering father, Tatang Dadong Carandang, a retired policeman, that she is pregnant. Mila asks permission from her father to marry her co-worker Noel Manalansan. Dadong begrudgingly gives his permission when his unreasonable demands for a hefty dowry are met.

After the wedding, Dadong insists that the newlyweds stay in his house. Despite protestations, the young couple acquiesces. During their time living in the Carandang house, Mila tells Noel that she must stay with her sick mother, Dely, much to Noel's annoyance as he wants to move out with Mila as soon as possible. One evening, Noel is forced to find other accommodations after he is locked out of the house.

Although still fearful of her father, Mila decides to escape. She and Noel stay with Noel's father. The young couple, however, return to the Carandang house to gather their belongings. Dadong pleads with Mila to stay, saying he has an interest in the baby she is carrying (suggesting that he has been carrying on an incestuous relationship with his daughter). As Mila and Noel stand firm on leaving, a depressed Dadong pulls out his gun and shoots Dely, Noel, Mila, and finally himself.

== Cast ==
- Vic Silayan as Tatang Dadong Carandang
- Charito Solis as Dely Carandang
- Charo Santos as Mila Carandang
- Jay Ilagan as Noel Manalansan
- Ruben Rustia as Peping Manalansan
- Aida Carmona as Onyang
- Juan Rodrigo as Ernie
- Cora Alforja as Cynthia
- Dino Angeles as Mario
- Edwin O'Hara as Policeman 1
- Mandy Bustamante as Policeman 2
- Mely Mallari as Diomy
- Monette Alfon as Landlady
- Teresita R. Sanchez as Dra. Trinidad

Although the original film credits had Solis's and Santos's characters as Adelina and Milagros Carandang, de Leon clarified upon the release of the restored version that their characters' names were Dely and Mila, respectively. Silayan's character is simply Tatang Dadong. Additionally, the last name Carandang is never mentioned in the film.

== Production ==
=== Inspiration ===
The film was inspired by The House on Zapote Street: The Curious Drama Behind the Massacre Last Week in Makati, written by Nick Joaquin under the pen name Quijano de Manila. The report was first published in the Philippine Free Press on January 28, 1961, and was later included in Joaquin's collection Reportage on Crime: Thirteen Horror Happenings that Hit the Headlines, published in 1977. Joaquin's piece chronicles the familicide committed by retired police detective Pablo Cabading. Divided into six "episodes," it is written in the New Journalism style, based on the journalist's own primary research and investigation, including witness interviews.

On January 18, 1961, Cabading shot his daughter, Lydia Cabading-Quitangon, and his son-in-law, Leonardo, both of whom were medical doctors. After killing the newlyweds, Cabading shot himself. His wife, Asuncion, survived and would later attempt to stop the release of the film.

Joaquin's reportage is silent about any rape that may have been committed by the father, but academic Joyce Arriola states that "the text suggests that possibility." De Leon was also influenced by the 1978 novel Blood Secrets by Craig Jones, which further developed the theme of incest.

The original version of the film omits Joaquin's name. According to de Leon, this was because the film's producers were seeking to avoid explicit reference to the real case. In the restored copy, the journalist is credited.

=== Development ===
After the release of Kung Mangarap Ka't Magising, de Leon was interested in adapting a story based on real events, writing in his memoir, "Countless true stories are waiting to be filmed. So why would I settle for fiction?" According to the director, in the 1970s, he was approached by the brother of one of the convicted perpetrators of the rape of Maggie de la Riva to make a movie about the crime. Although there had been several meetings, the project did not push through. The case was later dramatized in a 1994 film.

De Leon was also interested in adapting Joaquin's article as early as 1978 but experienced difficulty in finding a producer who was willing to back a film with such dark themes. He was later approached by producer Jackie Atienza who was interested in de Leon replicating the mood of de Leon's directorial debut Itim. They discussed adapting the novel Blood Secrets but eventually settled on Joaquin's article.

==== Writing ====
The screenplay was written by de Leon, Clodualdo del Mundo, Jr., and Raquel Villavicencio. The trio had previously worked together co-writing the 1980 musical Kakabakaba Ka Ba? and the then-on-production-hiatus Batch '81. Their co-writing process started with group discussions, followed by del Mundo and Villavicencio writing separate scenes that de Leon would make a composite from. With that as their first draft, they would continue building on it together. Back in 1978, Villavicencio answered a newspaper ad and participated in de Leon and del Mundo's first and only LVN Filmmaking Workshop.

During the writing process and even after most of the film had finished shooting, de Leon was not satisfied with the endings proposed. He re-read the broadsheet coverage of the crime as well as Joaquin's reportage. Instead of any dramatic confrontations, it came to de Leon that the ending happens "in the blink of an eye," and so the abruptness was replicated in the film.

In order to avoid lawsuits, the names of the people in Joaquin's report were changed from the Cabading family to the Carandang family, as well as the profession of the young couple from doctors to accountants. The timeline of the film was also changed from 1961 to 1981, the production year. Beyond the Joaquin article, De Leon did original research on the crime, uncovering details that were never released to the public, including the fact that the father hid under the young couple's bed while they were sleeping, that the father had two wives, and that after he had shot the others, the father lay down on his daughter's bed before shooting himself, although these were not incorporated into the film. Vic Silayan, who plays Dadong Carandang, had asked de Leon if the character could be changed to a step-father as he was uncomfortable with the incest issue, but they both acknowledged it would ultimately change the film.

=== Pre-production and filming ===
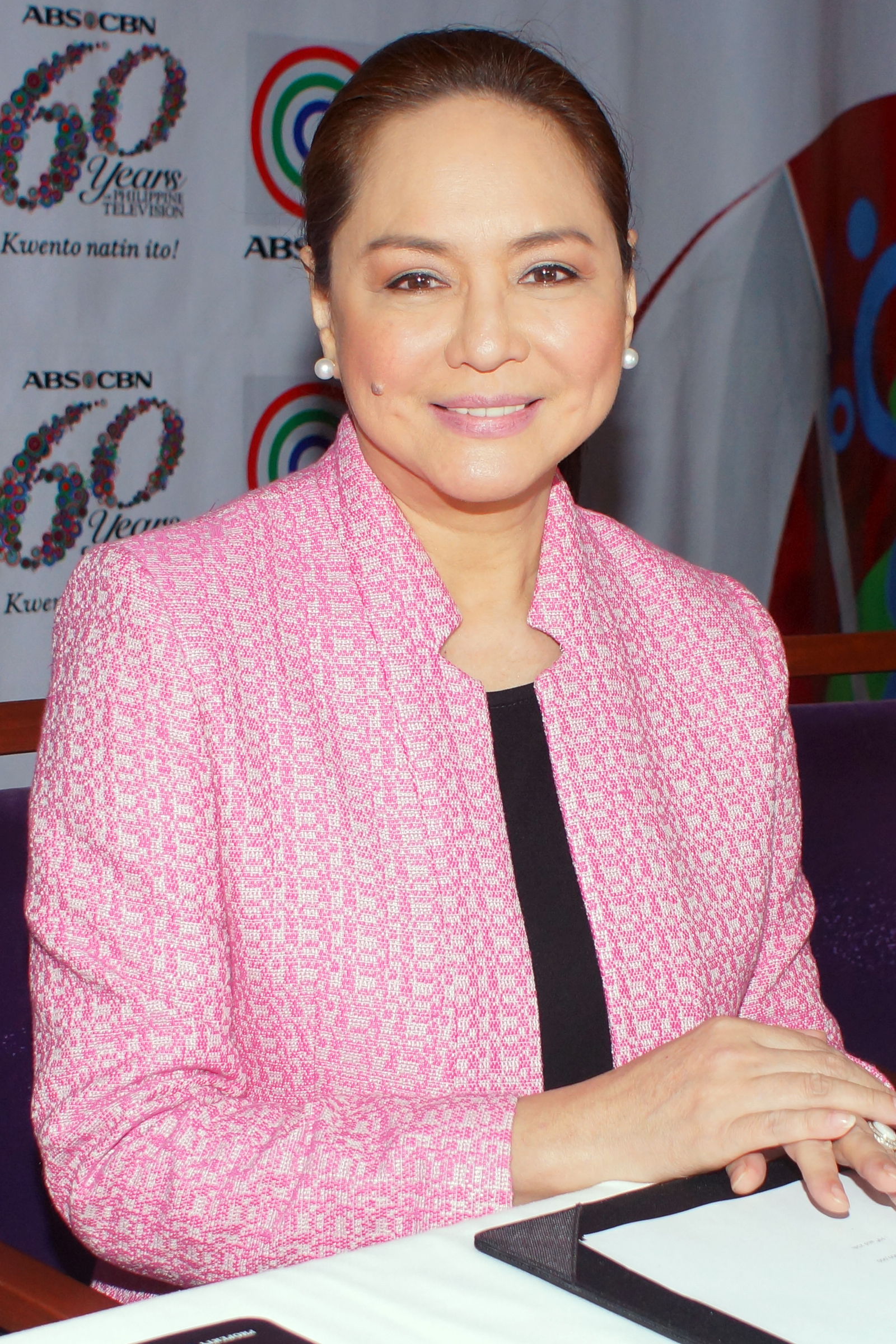
Charo Santos in 2014, president and CEO of ABS-CBN at the time. She was a line producer on Kisapamata, which she also starred in.

The film was shot while production on de Leon's Batch '81 was on hiatus due to budget problems. In May 1981, four months into principal photography for Batch '81, its producer, Marichu Maceda, announced that filming would have to pause. Maceda's other production, Pakawalan Mo Ako starring Vilma Santos, was behind schedule, and financing two films simultaneously was too expensive. Production on Batch '81 continued three months later; by that time de Leon and his creative team had filmed Kisapmata.

Production designer Cesar Hernando had come across the house while looking for a location to film the riot scene of Batch '81. Hernando recalled coming across the house for rent that was "eerily similar in structure to the original house on Zapote Street." It was rented for two months. The set was ready in three weeks, in which time Hernando and art director Lea Locsin remodeled it and added borrowed furniture to work around their tight budget. De Leon called Kisapmata "Cesar's best work among my films."

Shooting lasted 18 days. Actress Charo Santos both acted in and worked as a line producer on set. Santos made her acting debut in de Leon's 1976 film Itim and also starred in his 1980 film Kakabakaba Ka Ba?. She would go on to produce such films as Peque Gallaga's Oro, Plata, Mata and Ishmael Bernal's Himala before becoming the president and chief executive officer of ABS-CBN Corporation.

Actor Silayan recalled that for most films at the time, he was not given a script beforehand and thus found his film acting shallower than what he was able to convey on stage. It was only on Kisapmata and Marilou Diaz-Abaya's 1983 film Of the Flesh where he was given a script before shooting and thus able to add depth to the characters. On the character, Silayan said, "I don't think it was just authoritarian. It was insane possession."

=== Post-production ===
==== Deleted scene ====
A black-and-white dream sequence was filmed, although it was removed in editing. As keeping deleted scenes was not the practice in the Philippines at the time of production, the footage was thrown away. Several photos of the deleted scene have survived. In the dream, the bank where Mila and Noel work is turned into a hospital, with Mila on a gurney being wheeled by Noel into the bank vault. Throughout the bank, the tellers are dressed as nurses with crucifixes in front of them. Noel shoots Mila, but instead of a bullet, it is blood that is released from the gun. On the deleted scene, de Leon said, "I decided that the dream sequence was over the top and had no place in the film."

==== Censored scene ====
Due to its controversial theme, only subtle references to incest are used throughout the film. Nevertheless, Kisapmata was subjected to the Board of Censors for Motion Pictures, then headed by Senator Maria Kalaw Katigbak, who required de Leon to remove a scene where the father enters his daughter's room as she fearfully waits for him to come in. Katigbak told de Leon that the scene "showed him [the father] in an aroused state," to which the director, although complying with the demand, disagreed.

Academic Nicanor Tiongson found that as a result "the point of the scene – the horror of incest – was obscured."

De Leon and the film's editor Jess Navarro were able to save the negatives of the scene by making a duplicate and splicing it into a reel of negative out cuts from another film. The scene was re-added for the screening at the Cannes Film Festival. De Leon has referred to the Metro Manila Film Festival copy as the "theatrical version" and the Cannes Film Festival copy as the "final cut."

Kisapmata explores the concept of strongman rule as exemplified by the character of Dadong, ang Tatang, the psychotic padre de familia, rendered monstrous by the unforgettable performance of Vic Silayan. The father has incestuous relations with his daughter—the ultimate corruption. That the film was interpreted as an allegory of the regime of Ferdinand Marcos was no coincidence, though the crime happened in 1961. Nevertheless, many elements in this allegory were present in the original story. The policeman was an Ilocano, and so was Marcos. He ruled with an iron fist and subjected his family to unmitigated terror, just as Marcos did to the country.

— Mike de Leon in his 2022 memoir Last Look Back

== Themes and symbols ==
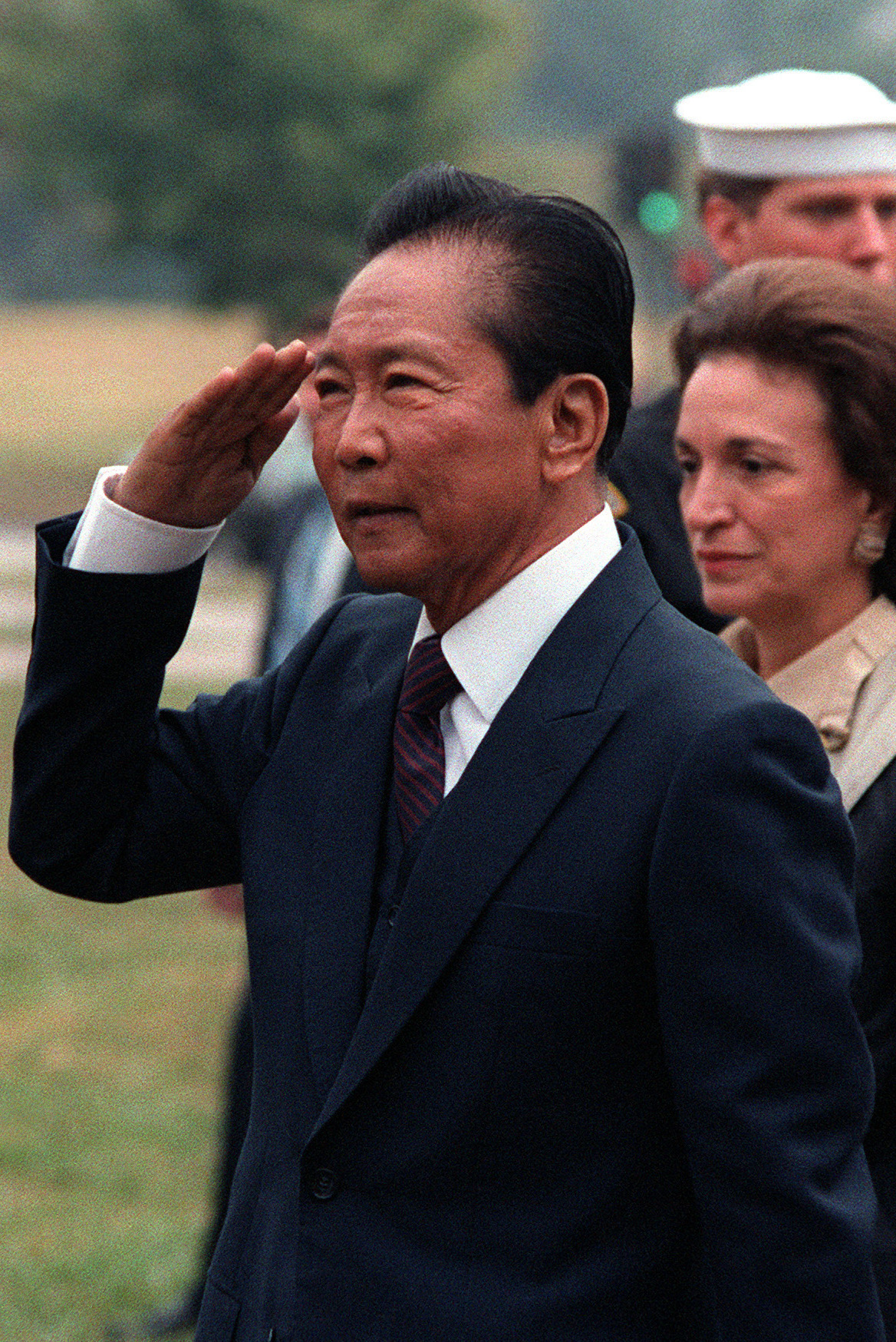
The film has been viewed by film academics as an allegory of President Ferdinand Marcos's (pictured above) regime. It was released on the year that martial law was officially lifted.

Kisapmata is generally viewed as an allegory of the dictatorial regime of then President Ferdinand Marcos, a theme director Mike de Leon explores in his films Batch '81 and Sister Stella L. Academic Nicanor Tiongson found the violent and unreasonable relationship of Dadong Carandang, the over-possessive father, with Mila, his incest victim, as a microcosm of Marcos' rule. Released in the year that martial law was lifted, during a time of growing political upheaval, the desperation and breakdown of the father as his daughter slips away subtly point towards the fragile condition of the Philippine nation.

=== Carandang house ===
The house used as the Carandang house in the film was located in Santa Mesa Heights, Quezon City, and had the design of the prevailing domestic architectural style: a split-level suburban home. It was considered the first and biggest production requirement of the film, providing a crucial function to establish the setting and mood.

The Carandang house has been viewed as an "inanimate embodiment" of Dadong Carandang or an "extension of the father's surveillance." Production designer Cesar Hernando found the split-level house "eerily similar" to the structure described in Nick Joaquin's article, where a person standing in the sala below could watch the doors of the bedrooms and bathrooms on the upper floor. Hernando and his team filled the house with furniture, including adding barbed wire to the gate, which emphasized the authoritarian rule and terror within the house. Film academic Tito Quiling, Jr. notes: "From the archetypal image of a domestic space as a symbol of security, the home becomes a representation of threat."

== Release ==
On December 24, 1981, a day before the opening of the 7th Metro Manila Film Festival, a temporary restraining order was filed by Asuncion Cabading to stop the screening of Kisapmata. Cabading was the widow of the deceased police detective written about in "The House on Zapote Street." Director Mike de Leon admitted that the production team had forgotten that she survived the massacre. The issue was quickly resolved, and the film was able to premiere on schedule the following day. After the film swept the Metro Manila Film Festival awards, de Leon recalled that actor-director Fernando Poe Jr., whose film Pagbabalik ng Panday was also in competition, told him, "I can make a Kisapmata any day in my life, but I challenge you to make a Panday."

During the 7th Metro Manila Film Festival, Pierre-Henri Deleau, a Cannes organizer, invited de Leon to show Kisapmata along with the director's then-work-in-progress Batch '81 at the 35th Cannes Film Festival. The two films screened at the Directors' Fortnight later that year. At the festival, French distributor Pascale Dauman offered to distribute Batch '81 and Kisapmata throughout Europe. The plans, however, fell through after the producers of both of the films had issues with their proposed box office cut.

=== Restoration ===
The digital restoration of the film was originally funded by de Leon and used an original print the director had kept at the Asian Film Archive in Singapore. This print used was of the "final cut" that screened at the Cannes Film Festival, not the edited and censored version shown at the Metro Manila Film Festival. The restoration itself was done by L'Immagine Ritrovata, the same film lab De Leon worked with for the restoration of his 1982 film Batch '81, as well as Lino Brocka's 1975 film Manila in the Claws of Light, on which de Leon was cinematographer and co-producer. While Kisapmata was in the process of being restored, Union Bank, the parent company of the defunct production company Bancom Audiovision, reimbursed de Leon half of the restoration cost and offered co-ownership.

On August 31, 2020, the restored version premiered at the 34th Il Cinema Ritrovato, a festival dedicated to recovered and restored classics, in Bologna, Italy.

The restoration's opening break bumper includes a dedication to several cast and crew members who had died since the original premiere: production designer Cesar Hernando, as well as actors Charito Solis, Jay Ilagan, Vic Silayan, and Ruben Rustia.

=== Home media ===
On December 19, 2020, the restored version of Kisapmata was made available to stream for free for one day through de Leon's Vimeo account "Citizen Jake." The original intention was to stream it on December 20 to coincide with the date of the final scene in the film, but it was determined that December 19, a Saturday, would have more viewers. Discussing the stream, de Leon commented, "I am calling it the most macabre Christmas movie ever."

In March 2023, Carlotta Films released the film in France as part of their Blu-ray box set of films directed by de Leon. Kani Releasing also released the film as a limited edition Blu-ray in April 2025. Kisapmata was later included in Letterboxd's online film-rental platform Video Store, which launched in December 2025.

=== Stage play ===
In 2025, Tanghalang Pilipino adapted the film as a stage play. The main cast had Jonathan Tadioan as Dadong, Lhorvie Nuevo-Tadioan as Dely, Toni Go-Yadao as Mila, and Marco Viaña as Noel. It was adapted from the movie version and directed by Guelan Varela-Luarca. The assistant directors were Rafael Jimenez and Kat Batara, the movement direction was done by JM Cabling, set design by Joey Mendoza, costume design by Bonsai Cielo, music and sound designs by Arvy Dimaculangan, lighting design and technical direction by D. Cortezano, and intimacy direction by Missy Maramara.

== Reception ==
=== Critical response ===
In an article on the 7th Metro Manila Film Festival, Elliott Stein found the performance of Vic Silayan memorable but the film's direction to be heavy-handed.

Upon the release of its restoration, the film saw positive retrospective reviews from Filipino critics. Noel Vera, writing for BusinessWorld, called Kisapmata "easily Mike de Leon's masterpiece" and "one of the greatest Filipino films." Similarly, Oggs Cruz considered the film de Leon's "masterpiece" going on to say "the characters in de Leon's films are real human beings – they work, they interact with other people, they have needs and ambitions. It is that factor that turns this nightmare even far more chilling that Hitchcock's masterpiece [Psycho]."

=== Accolades ===
Award	Date	Category	Recipient	Result	Ref.
1981 Metro Manila Film Festival	December 27, 1981	Best Picture	Kisapmata	Won	
1981 Metro Manila Film Festival	December 27, 1981	Best Director	Mike de Leon	Won	
1981 Metro Manila Film Festival	December 27, 1981	Best Story	Kisapmata; Written by Clodualdo del Mundo Jr., Raquel Villavicencio, and Mike de Leon	Won	
1981 Metro Manila Film Festival	December 27, 1981	Best Screenplay	Kisapmata; Written by Clodualdo del Mundo Jr., Raquel Villavicencio, and Mike de Leon	Won	
1981 Metro Manila Film Festival	December 27, 1981	Best Actor	Vic Silayan	Won	
1981 Metro Manila Film Festival	December 27, 1981	Best Supporting Actor	Jay Ilagan	Won	
1981 Metro Manila Film Festival	December 27, 1981	Best Supporting Actress	Charito Solis	Won	
1981 Metro Manila Film Festival	December 27, 1981	Best Editing	Jess Navarro	Won	
1981 Metro Manila Film Festival	December 27, 1981	Best Production Design	Cesar Hernando and Lea Locsin	Won	
1981 Metro Manila Film Festival	December 27, 1981	Best Sound Engineering	Ramon Reyes	Won	
6th Gawad Urian Awards	1982	Best Actor	Vic Silayan	Won	
6th Gawad Urian Awards	1982	Best Supporting Actor	Jay Ilagan	Won	
6th Gawad Urian Awards	1982	Best Supporting Actress	Charito Solis	Won	
6th Gawad Urian Awards	1982	Best Cinematography	Rody Lacap	Won	
6th Gawad Urian Awards	1982	Best Production Design	Cesar Hernando and Lea Locsin	Won	
6th Gawad Urian Awards	1982	Best Music	Lorrie Ilustre	Won	
6th Gawad Urian Awards	1982	Best Sound	Ramon Reyes	Won	

== See also ==
- Jaguar – 1979 Filipino film also produced by Bancom Audiovision and based on a crime reportage story by Nick Joaquin
- Of the Flesh – 1983 Filipino film that tackles similar issues and features Vic Silayan
