= 1955 Palanca Awards =

Philippine literary award

5th Palanca Memorial Awards

The 5th Carlos Palanca Memorial Awards for Literature was held to commemorate the memory of Carlos T. Palanca, Sr. through an endeavor that would promote education and culture in the country.

== English Division ==
=== Short Story ===
- First Prize: Juan C. Tuvera, "Ceremony"
- Second Prize: Edith L. Tiempo, "The Dam"
- Third Prize: Virgilio R. Samonte, "The Other Woman"

=== One-Act Play ===
- First Prize: Magtanggol Asa, "The Long Dark Night"
- Second Prize: Antonio O. Bayot, "Among the Faithless"
- Third Prize: Jose M. Hernandez, "White Sunday"

== Filipino Division ==
=== Maikling Kwento ===
- First Prize: Genoveva Edroza-Matute, "Paglalayag sa Puso ng Isang Bata"
- Second Prize: Elpidio P. Kapulong, "Batingaw"
- Third Prize: Virgilio Blones, "Lumamig na Bakal"

=== Dulang May Isang Yugto ===
- First Prize: Fidel Sicam and Purita Sicam, "Pitong Taon"
- Second Prize: Clodualdo Del Mundo, "May Ningning ang Kinabukasan"
- Third Prize: Fernando L. Samonte, "Kamatayan, Iba't ibang Anyo"

== Sources ==
- "The Don Carlos Palanca Memorial Awards for Literature | Winners 1955". Archived from the original on 2009-10-22.
