= Mike de Leon =

Filipino film director (1947–2025)

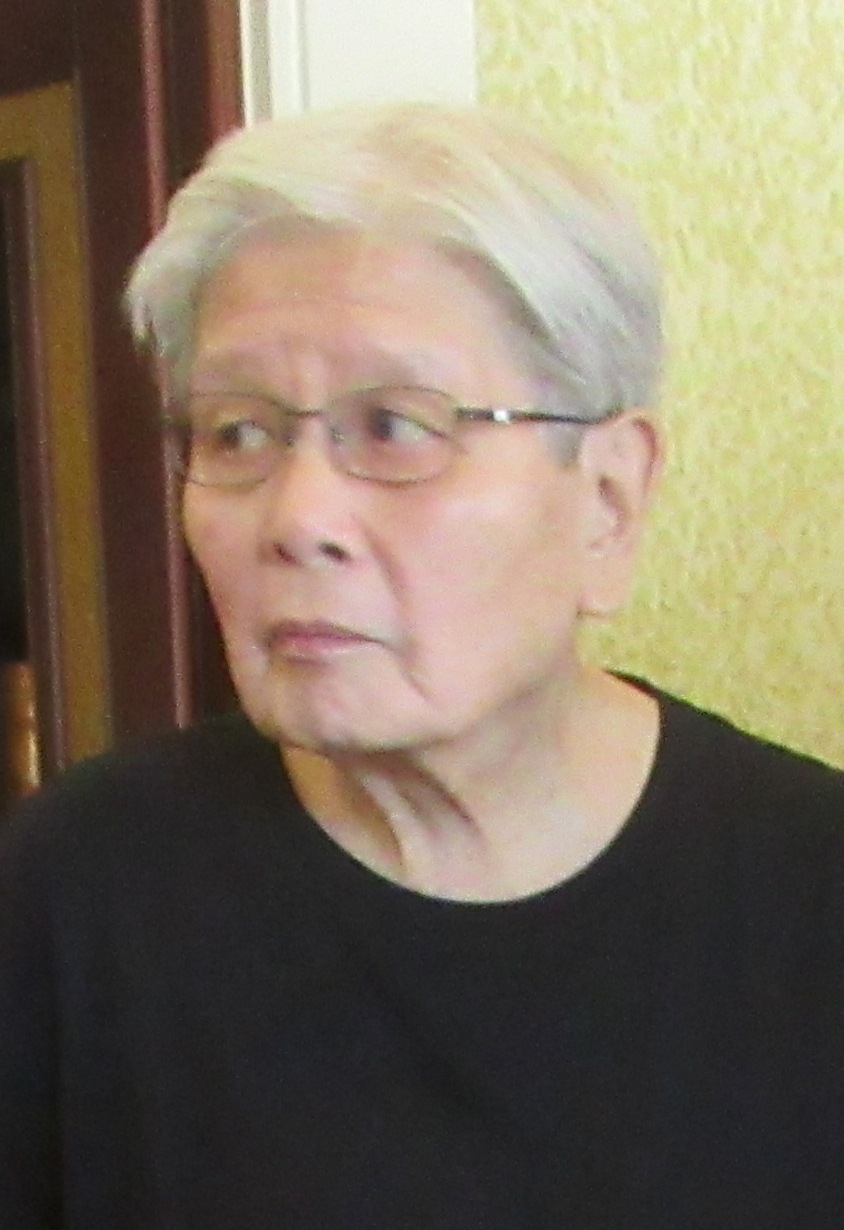
- De Leon in 2023
- Born: Miguel Pamintuan de Leon; May 24, 1947; Manila, Philippines
- Died: August 28, 2025 (aged 78)
- Education: Ateneo de Manila University (BA); University of Heidelberg (MA)
- Occupations: Film director; screenwriter; cinematographer; producer
- Years active: 1972–2001, 2016–2019
- Relatives: Narcisa Buencamino vda. de León (grandmother)

Miguel "Mike" Pamintuan de Leon (May 24, 1947 – August 28, 2025) was a Filipino film director. He is regarded as one of the most significant filmmakers in the history of Philippine cinema. His films, which include Itim (1976), Kung Mangarap Ka't Magising (1977), Kakabakaba Ka Ba? (1980), Kisapmata (1981), Batch '81 (1981), Sister Stella L. (1984), Bayaning 3rd World (2000), and Citizen Jake (2018), tackle Philippine social and political themes. De Leon also shot and produced Lino Brocka's film Manila in the Claws of Light (1975), considered to be one of the greatest Filipino films.

== Early life and education ==
De Leon was born on March 24, 1947, in Manila, Philippines, to producer Manuel de Leon and Imelda Pamintuan. Through his father, he is the grandson of LVN Pictures founder Narcisa "Sisang" de Leon. His sister, Narcisa ("Ching"), served as appointments secretary for President Corazon Aquino.

He received his bachelor's degree from the Ateneo de Manila University before studying art history at the University of Heidelberg in Germany.

== Film career ==
=== Early career ===
De Leon directed two short films, Sa Bisperas (1972) and Monologo (1975). In 1975, he established Cinema Artists Philippines, a production company. Its initial film production was Lino Brocka's Manila in the Claws of Light, where De Leon also served as cinematographer. He also produced Cirio H. Santiago's Happy Days Are Here Again (1974), a compilation of performances from musical comedies produced by LVN, Sampaguita Pictures, and Premiere Productions.

De Leon made his feature directorial debut with Itim, released in 1976. It starred Charo Santos in her first film role. Itim was a commercial failure but received positive reviews from critics.

His next film, the romance drama Kung Mangarap Ka't Magising, was released in 1977. It starred Christopher de Leon and Hilda Koronel. The film was dedicated to De Leon's grandmother, whose centennial birthday was celebrated that year.

=== 1980s ===
De Leon was the cinematographer for Eddie Romero’s epic Aguila, released in 1980 and starring Fernando Poe Jr.

After a three-year break from directing, De Leon returned with the musical comedy Kakabakaba Ka Ba?, also released in 1980. Reuniting with Christopher de Leon and Charo Santos and also starring Jay Ilagan and Sandy Andolong, the film satirized Chinese and Japanese neocolonialism as well as organized religion. De Leon won the Gawad Urian Best Director award for the film.

In 1981, De Leon directed the psychological horror film Kisapmata, co-writing the script with Clodualdo del Mundo and Raquel Villavicencio based on the news article "The House on Zapote Street" by Nick Joaquin. It stars Vic Silayan as a patriarch dominating the marriage of his daughter and her husband, played by Charo Santos and Jay Ilagan. At the 1982 Metro Manila Film Festival, the film won 10 awards, including Best Picture as well as Best Director and Best Screenplay for De Leon. His next film, Batch 81, was released the following year. Starring Mark Gil in his breakout role, the film criticized President Ferdinand Marcos's martial law rule by depicting the titular fraternity's brutal initiation rituals.

Batch '81 and Kisapmata were later screened at the 1982 Cannes Film Festival Directors' Fortnight. While at the festival, De Leon was interviewed by German filmmaker Wim Wenders for his 1985 documentary Room 666.

De Leon next directed the political film Sister Stella L. (1984) from a screenplay co-written with activist Pete Lacaba. Starring Vilma Santos as the titular character, it was the first politically themed film from Regal Films after De Leon asked its founder Lily Monteverde to produce the film due to limited financial resources. Sister Stella L. later won 10 Gawad Urian awards, including Best Picture and Best Director, and also competed for the Golden Lion at the 41st Venice International Film Festival.

After the commercial failure of Sister Stella L., De Leon directed the melodrama Hindi Nahahati ang Langit in 1985, based on the comic serial of the same name by Nerissa Cabral. Starring Christopher de Leon, Lorna Tolentino, Edu Manzano, and Dina Bonnevie, it became his most commercially successful film in the Philippines.

In 1986, De Leon directed Bilanggo Sa Dilim, an adaptation of John Fowles's debut novel The Collector. Starring Joel Torre and Cherie Gil, it was one of the first Filipino features shot on video.

=== 1990s–2001 ===
In 1993, De Leon directed a segment for the anthology film Southern Winds, produced by Japan Foundation. Titled "Aliwan Paradise", it satirizes the Philippine entertainment industry's fascination with poverty porn for international recognition.

De Leon was initially in talks with GMA Pictures to direct a Jose Rizal biopic starring Aga Muhlach in the title role, but they both dropped out. GMA Pictures eventually produced and released Jose Rizal, directed by Marilou Diaz-Abaya and starring Cesar Montano, in 1998. In 2000, De Leon directed the mockumentary Bayaning 3rd World, about two filmmakers trying to make a film about Rizal.

In 2001, De Leon produced the short film Motorsiklo from director Cesar Hernando, who had served as production designer on his films, before going on a hiatus from the film industry.

=== Late career ===
In 2016, De Leon made three short video essays titled Never Again, Mike De Leon on Delicadeza and Mike De Leon on Duterte.

De Leon's last feature film was the 2018 film Citizen Jake, a scathing indictment of President Rodrigo Duterte and starring real-life journalist Atom Araullo as the titular character. He was a co-writer, a producer and director of the film.

In 2019, De Leon released two video essays titled Kangkungan which was a critique of the presidency of Rodrigo Duterte, and Mr. Li which was a critique on "[the Philippines'] subservience to China".

In November 2022, the Museum of Modern Art presented a retrospective of De Leon's films, alongside Manila in the Claws of Light and selected restorations of films produced by LVN. De Leon also released his two-volume memoir Last Look Back in December.

== Death ==
De Leon was diagnosed with prostate cancer in 2016. De Leon died on August 28, 2025 at the age of 78. His death was confirmed on that date by his family to French film distributor Carlotta Films, which had previously released a box set of his films in France.

== Awards and recognitions ==
In 1999, the Cultural Center of the Philippines awarded De Leon the Centennial Honors for the Arts.

In 2014, De Leon declined to receive the Natatanging Gawad Urian lifetime achievement award, stating, "I just want to be alone. I’m no longer a director and I’m no longer public property." In 2024, de Leon also declined to receive the Gawad CCP Para sa Sining, the highest award given by the organization.

== Works ==
=== Feature films ===
| Year | Original title | English title | Director | Writer | Producer | Notes |
|---|---|---|---|---|---|---|
| 1975 | Maynila, sa mga Kuko ng Liwanag | Manila in the Claws of Light | No | No | Yes | Also cinematographer; directed by Lino Brocka |
| 1976 | Itim | The Rites of May | Yes | No | No | |
| 1977 | Kung Mangarap Ka't Magising | Moments in a Stolen Dream | Yes | Yes | No | Co-written with Rey Santayana; also cinematographer |
| 1980 | Aguila | | No | No | No | Cinematographer; directed by Eddie Romero |
| 1980 | Kakabakaba Ka Ba? | Will Your Heart Beat Faster? | Yes | Yes | No | Co-written with Clodualdo del Mundo, Jr., and Raquel Villavicencio |
| 1981 | Kisapmata | In the Wink of an Eye | Yes | Yes | No | Co-written with Clodualdo del Mundo, Jr. and Raquel Villavicencio |
| 1982 | Batch '81 | | Yes | Yes | No | Co-written with Clodualdo del Mundo, Jr. and Raquel Villavicencio |
| 1984 | Sister Stella L. | | Yes | Yes | No | Co-written with Jose F. Lacaba and Jose Almojuela |
| 1985 | Hindi Nahahati ang Langit | An Indivisible Heaven | Yes | No | No | Uncredited as director on initial release |
| 1986 | Bilanggo sa Dilim | Prisoner in the Dark | Yes | Yes | No | Co-written with Jose Almojuela and Bobby Lavides, based on John Fowles' The Collector; also editor |
| 2000 | Bayaning 3rd World | Third World Hero | Yes | Yes | Yes | Co-written with Clodualdo del Mundo, Jr. |
| 2018 | Citizen Jake | | Yes | Yes | Yes | Co-written with Noel Pascual and Atom Araullo |

=== Short films ===
| Year | Original title | English title | Director | Writer | Producer | Notes |
|---|---|---|---|---|---|---|
| 1972 | Monologo | Monologue | Yes | Yes | Yes | Now lost; portion of the film can be found in the documentary Itim: Isang Eksplorasyon sa Pelikula |
| 1983 | Signos | Omens | Yes | No | No | Documentary; co-directed with members of the Concerned Artists of the Philippines |
| 1993 | Aliwan Paradise | | Yes | No | No | Co-written with Clodualdo del Mundo, Jr.; made for the anthology film Southern Winds |
| 2000 | Motorsiklo | Motorcycle | No | Yes | Yes | Directed by Cesar Hernando |

== Books ==
- Mike de Leon’s Last Look Back (2022)

== Works cited ==
- Campos, Patrick (2006). "Looming Over the Nation, Uneasy with the Folks: Locating Mike de Leon in Philippine Cinema". Humanities Diliman: A Journal on Philippine Humanities. 3 (2): 35–73.
- Sangil, Anne Frances (2021). "Lost in Adaptation: Antifidelity and/in Mike De Leon's Bilanggo sa Dilim and Bayaning 3rd World". Akda: The Asian Journal of Literature, Culture, Performance. 1 (2): 71–83. doi:10.59588/2782-8875.1016. Archived from the original on January 19, 2025.
- Vibal, Gaspar; Villegas, Dennis (2020). Philippine Cinema, 1897–2020. Vibal Foundation. ISBN 978-971-97-0717-2.
