= Karma (1981 film) =

1981 romantic drama film by Danny L. Zialcita

- Official movie poster
- Directed by: Danny L. Zialcita
- Screenplay by: Danny L. Zialcita
- Story by: Sylvia Barretto
- Produced by: Ernesto C. Rojas (Note: Credited as "Executive Producer" of the film)
- Starring: Vilma Santos; Ronaldo Valdez; Chanda Romero; Tommy Abuel
- Cinematography: Felizardo Bailen
- Edited by: Enrique Jarlego Sr.
- Music by: Gilbert Gregorio
- Production company: Sining Silangan Productions
- Release date: December 25, 1981
- Running time: 102 minutes
- Country: Philippines
- Languages: Filipino; English

Karma is a 1981 Philippine romantic drama film directed by Danny L. Zialcita from a written story by Sylvia Barretto and screenplay by Zialcita. The film stars Vilma Santos and Ronaldo Valdez in their respective roles as Sarah and Eric, the reincarnation of the past lovers Guada and Enrico (played by Leila Hermosa and Dante Rivero, respectively), who were killed by Limbo (played by Ruel Vernal). After they reincarnated, Sarah and Eric will cross paths with each other because of destiny but their love will be a center of jealousy from their respective lovers, Sara's fiance Alfredo (Tommy Abuel) and Cristy (Chanda Romero).

Karma was released on December 25, 1981 by Sining Silangan Productions and it served as one of the entries for the 7th Metro Manila Film Festival. It also received accolades from various award-giving bodies, particularly the Best Actress award for Santos from the said film festival. The film was digitally restored and remastered by ABS-CBN Film Restoration and L'Immagine Ritrovata in 2017.

== Plot ==
=== Cold open ===
In an old and dark house somewhere in Manila, Guada enters the house. She reunites with her lover Enrico and they share a romantic night. Guada told Enrico they will never see each other again but he said that will never happen. Soon after, Limbo arrives and shows up in their room, and accuses Enrico of having a relationship with his wife. Limbo threatened his wife that she will go to hell and for Enrico, Limbo threatens to kill him after saying his last words but he replied back that it is just a gunshot and a body and he vows that he and Guada will be reincarnated in the world. Before he shoots Guada and Enrico to death, he vows that he would kill them again in the next life. After Limbo killed them, he committed suicide by shooting his gun at his head.

=== Main story ===
Years after the death and eventual reincarnation of Guada and Enrico, Sarah, a young woman and Guada's reincarnation, was about to get married soon and got stranded in a hotel but the rooms were fully booked.

== Cast ==
- Vilma Santos as Sarah, the reincarnation of Guada
- Tommy Abuel as Alfredo, Sarah's fiancee-turned-husband
- Ronaldo Valdez as Eric, the reincarnation of Enrico
- Chanda Romero as Cristy, Eric's lover
- Aurora Salve as Olivia
- Bella Flores as Pimp
- Suzanne Gonzales as Suzanna
- Fred Montilla as Father-in-Law
- Virginia Montes as Mother-in-Law
- Vic Silayan as Psychiatrist
- Augusto Victa as Gynecologist
- Butch Aquino as Priest
- Ruel Vernal as Limbo, the killer of Guada and Enrico
- Etang Ditscher as Housekeeper
- Renato Robles as Hotel Manager
- Martha Sevilla as Flight Stewardess
- Odette Khan as Userer
- Rolly Papasin as Cardiologist

=== Special participation ===
- Leila Hermosa as Guada, Sarah's past life
- Dante Rivero as Enrico, Eric's past life
- Christopher de Leon as Edwin

== Production ==
=== Music ===
The film's theme song "Minsan sa Isang Panahon" was performed by Kuh Ledesma and the lyrics were written by Levi Celerio and arrangements by Emy Munji.

== Release ==
The film was released by Sining Silangan Productions and premiered on December 25, 1981, as one of the entries for the 7th Metro Manila Film Festival and it became a box-office success.

=== Digital restoration ===
The film's restoration was digitally restored and remastered by the ABS-CBN Film Restoration Project and L'Immagine Ritrovata in Bologna, Italy, and Hong Kong S.A.R. The 35mm print, which contains numerous scratches and deformations and was stored at the ABS-CBN Film Archives in Quezon City, was the used source for the restoration. It was first scanned in 4K resolution through a digital print scanner before proceeding to a 2K resolution digital image restoration.

Vilma Santos, the film's lead actress, was delighted that the film is one of the titles being restored by ABS-CBN, and according to her, Karma is one of her favorites. The restored version of the film was premiered on October 21, 2017, at the UP Town Center as part of the QCinema International Film Festival's exhibition of restored films as well as a gala premiere on October 27, 2017, at Trinoma, attended by lead actor Ronaldo Valdez, surviving members of the film's staff, and the restoration team.

The restored version of Karma was also shown at Cinema One Originals film festival on November 20, 2017, at Glorietta. It was part of the film festival's Restored Classics section, in which it would exhibit Marilou Diaz-Abaya's two films Moral and Karnal and Steven Spielberg's Close Encounters of the Third Kind for the said event.

=== Television broadcast ===
The restored version received a free-to-air television premiere on February 3, 2019 on ABS-CBN as a feature presentation for its Sunday late-night special presentation program, Sunday's Best. According to the Kantar Media statistics, the film received a national TV rating of 1.6% of households tuning to their television sets, losing against to GMA Network's SNBO broadcast of the 2009 film Overheard which attained a rating of 2.3% for its first hour but won against Diyos at Bayan, which attained a 0.3% rating on its second and final hour.

== Reception ==
=== Critical reception ===
Aside from being one of her favorite films, lead actress Vilma Santos described the film's director, Danny Zialcita as a "genius" and the film as a "classic", compared to the romantic comedy films that exist nowadays. DJ Ramones from Reverse Delay described the film's plot as "cheesy" but it sometimes makes twists that are "not too novel, but nevertheless satisfying".

=== Accolades ===
Year	Award-Giving Body	Category	Recipient	Result
1981	Metro Manila Film Festival	Best Actress	Vilma Santos	Won
1982	FAMAS	Best Supporting Actor	Tommy Abuel	Won
1982	FAMAS	Best Supporting Actress	Chanda Romero	Won
