= Hindi Nahahati ang Langit =

1985 romantic drama film by Mike de Leon

- Poster of the film's restored version
- Directed by: Mike De Leon
- Screenplay by: Mia A. Concio
- Story by: Nerissa G. Cabral
- Based on: Hindi Nahahati ang Langit by Nerissa G. Cabral
- Produced by: Charo Santos-Concio; Simon C. Ongpin
- Starring: Christopher de Leon; Lorna Tolentino; Edu Manzano; Dina Bonnevie; Nestor de Villa; Gloria Romero
- Cinematography: Pedro Manding Jr.
- Edited by: George Jarlego
- Music by: Willie Cruz
- Production company: Vanguard Films
- Distributed by: Vanguard Films; ABS-CBN Film Productions (restored version)
- Release date: March 7, 1985
- Running time: 127 minutes
- Country: Philippines
- Language: Filipino

Hindi Nahahati ang Langit (English: An Indivisible Heaven) is a 1985 Philippine romantic drama film directed by Mike de Leon from a screenplay written by Mia A. Concio, based on the Tagalog Klasiks serial of the same name by Nerissa G. Cabral. The film stars Christopher de Leon and Lorna Tolentino playing the respective roles of stepsiblings Noel and Melody. Dina Bonnevie and Edu Manzano play the roles of Noel and Melody's respective spouses, Cynthia and Ronald.

Produced by Vanguard Films, under the helm of Charo Santos-Concio and Simon C. Ongpin, the film was theatrically released on March 7, 1985. It was later loosely adapted into a TV series by ABS-CBN as Walang Kapalit, which aired from April 23 to August 31, 2007.

== Synopsis ==
After the union of Agnes and Ariston, Noel and Melody became step-siblings but did not get along until they reached adulthood. When their parents died, Noel was forced to become Melody's legal guardian despite their lack of closeness. As they grew older, they each married different people: Melody married Ronald, and Noel married Cynthia. Eventually, Noel and Melody became business partners, and their confession of love for each other led to the breakdown of their respective marriages and brought a stigma to their relationship. The affair made Ronald and Cynthia furious with their respective spouses, but Noel and Melody continued to love each other.

== Cast ==
- Christopher de Leon as Noel
  - Marco Polo Garcia as Young Noel
- Lorna Tolentino as Melody
  - Jennifer Sevilla as Young Melody
- Dina Bonnevie as Cynthia
- Edu Manzano as Ronald
- Nestor de Villa as Ariston Delgado
- Gloria Romero as Agnes Grivas
- Gigi de la Riva as Ressie
- Jimmy Javier as Paul
- Chito Ponce Enrile as Mr. Roxas
- Dino Angeles as Doctor

== Release ==
Vanguard Films theatrically released the film on March 7, 1985. It became a blockbuster in its theatrical run and director Mike de Leon's most commercially successful film to date.

The restoration of Hindi Nahahati ang Langit, made possible by ABS-CBN Film Restoration and Central Digital Lab, was complicated due to the condition of the 35mm negative print. Director Mike de Leon was not involved in the restoration and color grading of the film but he approved to put his directorial credit on the opening credits.

The film's restored version was released on November 11, 2014, in Trinoma Cinema as part of the Cinema One Originals film festival.

=== Home media ===
Hindi Nahahati ang Langit, along with the selected number of films directed by de Leon, was released on Blu-ray by Carlotta Films.
