= Sister Stella L. =

1984 political drama film by Mike de Leon

- Official movie poster
- Directed by: Mike de Leon
- Written by: Pete Lacaba; Jose Almojuela; Mike de Leon; Ellen Ongkeko (Note: Additional dialogue)
- Produced by: Lily Monteverde
- Starring: Vilma Santos; Jay Ilagan; Gina Alajar; Laurice Guillen; Tony Santos Sr.
- Cinematography: Rody Lacap
- Edited by: Jesus "Jess" Navarro
- Music by: Ding Achacoso
- Production company: Regal Films
- Distributed by: Regal Films
- Release date: July 11, 1984
- Running time: 103 minutes
- Country: Philippines
- Language: Filipino

Sister Stella L., originally titled Sangandaan, is a 1984 Philippine political drama film directed by Mike de Leon from a screenplay he co-wrote with Pete Lacaba and Jose Almojuela, with additional dialogue written by Ellen Ongkeko. The screenplay was based on and inspired by the life and experiences of Sr. Chayong Battung and Sr. Mary Pilar Versoza, and it follows a nun who became politically involved as she took part in a strike where she fought for the rights of the workers. It stars Vilma Santos as the titular nun of the film, Jay Ilagan, Gina Alajar, Laurice Guillen, Tony Santos Sr., Anita Linda, and Liza Lorena.

Initially, Mike de Leon wanted to produce the film by himself. However, because of financial limitations, he was forced to ask Regal Films founder and executive producer Lily Monteverde to join as producer and she agreed. Produced and distributed by Regal Films, the film, theatrically released on July 11, 1984, was a commercial failure but received acclaim when it won fifteen awards, including Best Picture, Best Actor, Best Actress, Best Screenplay, and Best Director, from the Gawad Urian Awards. It also competed at the 41st Venice International Film Festival for the Golden Lion but lost to Krzysztof Zanussi's A Year of the Quiet Sun.

The film's theme song "Aling Pag-ibig Pa" was selected by the Catholic Mass Media Awards as the best theme song in 1984.

== Synopsis ==
Sister Stella Legaspi is a nun who serves as a guidance counselor for people who have problems, including abused women and runaways. Later, she becomes involved in sociopolitical issues when she joins a strike organized by laborers.

== Cast ==
- Vilma Santos as Sister Stella Legaspi
- Jay Ilagan as Nick Fajardo
- Gina Alajar as Gigi
- Laurice Guillen as Sister Stella Bautista
- Tony Santos Sr. as Ka Dencio
- Anita Linda as Auring
- Eddie Infante as Ka Sidring
- Adul de Leon as Sister Juaning
- Rody Vera as Roger
- Pen Medina as Nes
- Jojo Sanchez as Sister Carmen
- Raquel Villavicencio as Sister Annie
- Malou de Guzman as Soledad
- Joe Jardi and Waldo Reyes as Goons
- Ruben Rustia as Factory Manager
- Liza Lorena as Magazine Editor
- Fred Capulong as Kapitan

== Production ==
In a May 2011 episode of Inside the Cinema, hosted by Boy Abunda, writer Pete Lacaba stated that the film's original title was "Sangandaan." However, Regal Films assistant producer Marichu Maceda offered a more memorable title. Lacaba proposed adding the letter "L," which is an implied reference to the Filipino word "libog" ("lust" in English), to the film's title, "Sister Stella," which made Maceda initially skeptical because it was named after Stella Maris College, Quezon City, where he and director Mike de Leon conducted a research via interviewing a nun.

== Reception ==
=== Accolades ===
Award-giving organization	Date of ceremony	Category	Recipient(s)	Result	Ref.
33rd FAMAS Awards	1985	Best Picture	Sister Stella L.	Nominated	
33rd FAMAS Awards	1985	Best Actress	Vilma Santos	Nominated	
33rd FAMAS Awards	1985	Best Supporting Actor	Tony Santos Sr.	Won (Note: Tied with Celso Ad. Castillo from Sampung Ahas ni Eva.)	
33rd FAMAS Awards	1985	Best Supporting Actress	Laurice Guillen	Nominated	
33rd FAMAS Awards	1985	Best Director	Mike de Leon	Nominated	
33rd FAMAS Awards	1985	Best Editing	Jess Navarro	Won	

== Digital restoration ==
In 2012, when ABS-CBN Corporation began its film restoration campaign, they wanted to restore the film, but it failed to push through due to various disagreements, particularly with the director's grievances toward the Monteverdes regarding the matter of restoring it. (Note: Attributed to these references:) In June 2023, the Film Development Council of the Philippines announced that they teamed up with Regal Entertainment to restore two films from the said film studio that starred Vilma Santos, among the two is the 1984 film Sister Stella L.

The restored 4K version, with the scenes that were deleted by the Marcos-era censors being reinstated (which were funded personally by de Leon), premiered on June 23, 2026, as part of the 40th Il Cinema Ritrovato in Bologna, Italy. A Philippine premiere of the restored version was held on September 20, 2026, at the Metropolitan Theater, as part of Philippine Film Industry Month.
