= Vic Silayan =

Filipino actor (1929-1987)

- Born: Victor Payumo Silayan; January 31, 1929; Gapan, Nueva Ecija, Philippine Islands
- Died: August 30, 1987 (aged 58); Metro Manila, Philippines
- Resting place: Manila Memorial Park, Parañaque, Philippines
- Occupation: Actor
- Years active: 1953–1987
- Children: Chat Silayan
- Relatives: Jose Mari Victor Silayan (grandson)

Victor Payumo Silayan (January 31, 1929 – August 30, 1987) was a Filipino actor. He has appeared in over 300 films throughout his career that spanned over three decades. Silayan was best known for his performances in Anak Dalita (1956), Badjao (1957), Malvarosa (1958), Kisapmata (1981), and Karnal (1983).

== Personal life ==
He was born in Gapan, Nueva Ecija, Philippines. Vic was the father of beauty queen and actress Chat Silayan and grandfather of Victor Silayan.

His younger sister was social activist Aurora Silayan-Go. Aurora had a daughter, fashion designer Rina Go.

== Death ==
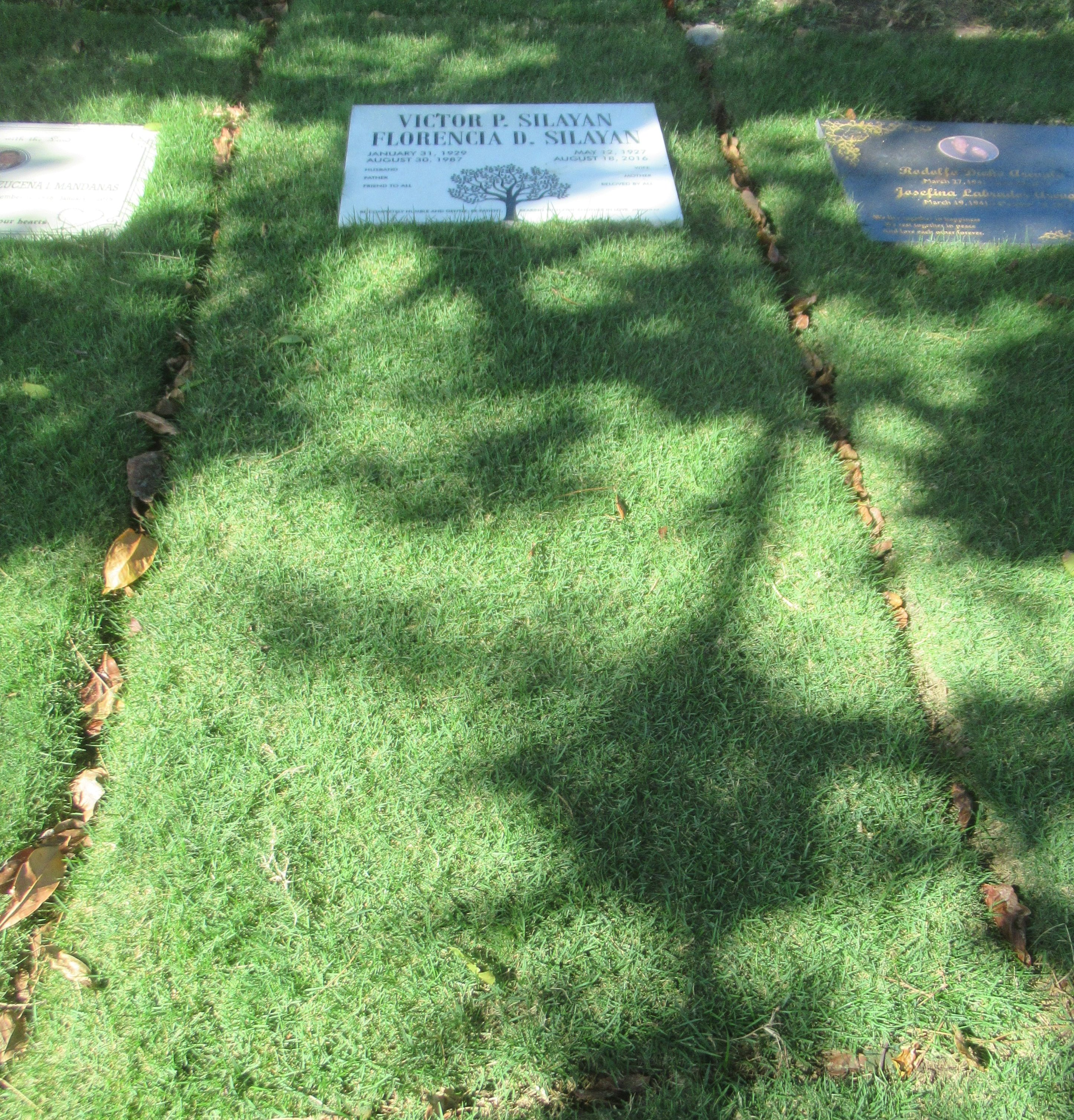
Tomb of Silayan and his wife Florencia at Manila Memorial Park – Sucat, Parañaque

Silayan died of a heart attack on August 30, 1987, at the age of 58.

== Filmography ==
=== Film ===
- American Guerrilla in the Philippines (1950) - Japanese General (uncredited)
- Huk sa Bagong Pamumuhay (1953) - Captain Mendoza
- Hiyasmin (1953)
- Lapu-Lapu (1955) - Arturo
- Higit sa Lahat (1955) - Totoy
- Dalagang Taring (1955)
- Salamangkero (1955)
- Anak Dalita (1956) - Father Fidel
- Dalawang Ina (1957)
- Badjao (1957) - Jikiri
- Troop 11 (1957)
- Malvarosa (1958) - Melanio
- Kundiman ng lahi (1959)
- Mr. Announcer (1959) - Lundagin Mo Baby
- Basilio Baston (1962)
- No Man Is an Island (1962) - Major Hondo
- Death Was a Stranger (1963)
- Cry of Battle (1963) - Capt. Garcia
- Zigzag (1963)
- Scout Rangers (1964)
- Strike! (1965)
- The Ravagers (1965) - Captain Mori
- Sa Bawa't Hakbang... Panganib (1965)
- Pedrong Hunyango (1965)
- Karate sa Karate (1965)
- Pilipinas Kong Mahal (1965)
- Anghel sa Aking Balikat (1965)
- A Portrait of the Artist as Filipino (1965) - Vito
- Counter Spy (1966)
- Operation XYZ (1966)
- Combat Bataan (1966)
- Zamboanga (1966)
- Sarhento Aguila at ang 9 na Magigiting (1966)
- Kill... Tony Falcon (1966)
- Dugo ang kulay ng pag-Ibig (1966)
- Ito ang Pilipino (1966)
- Badong Baldado (1966)
- Cobra Challenges the Jokers (1967)
- The Longest Hundred Miles (1967) - Japanese General (uncredited)
- Roman Montalan (1967)
- Masquerade (1967) - Judge Dante Soriano
- Carnap (1967)
- Boy Aguila (1967)
- Ang kan ng haragan (1967)
- Suntok o karate (1968)
- The Karate Champions (1968)
- Target Captain Karate (1968)
- Destination Vietnam (1968)
- Cuadro de Jack (1968)
- Combat Killers (1968)
- Gagamba at si Scorpio (1969)
- Ang ninong kong Nazareno (1969)
- Kalinga (1969)
- Perlas ng silangan (1969)
- Simon bastardo (1970) - Padre Martin
- The Sky Divers (1970)
- Heredera (1970)
- Code Name: Apollo (1970) - Gerry Valencia
- The Secret of the Sacred Forest (1970)
- Blood Thirst (1971) - Calderon
- Lilet (1971)
- Night of the Cobra Woman (1972) - Dr. Tezon
- Kill the Pushers (1972)
- Daughters of Satan (1972) - Dr. Dangal
- Erap Is My Guy (1973)
- Paruparong Itim (1973)
- Ambrose Dugal (1973)
- Ang bukas ay atin (1973)
- Dragnet (1973)
- Ander di saya si Erap (1973)
- Ikaw lamang (1973)
- Ransom (1974)
- Batingaw (1974)
- Master Samurai (1974)
- South Seas (1974)
- Manila Connection (1974)
- Mister Mo, Lover Boy Ko (1975)
- Huwag pamarisan, Mister Mo. Lover Boy Ko (1975)
- Diligin Mo ng Hamog ang Uhaw na Lupa (1975) - Vicente Zarcan (segment 4)
- Sa kagubatan ng lunsod (1975)
- Kumander Agimat (1975)
- Hiwaga (1975)
- Diligin mo ng hamog ang uhaw na lupa (1975)
- Mahiwagang kris (1975)
- Ang pag-ibig ko'y huwag mong sukatin (1975)
- Cui hua du jiang tou (1975)
- Ligaw Na bulaklak (1976)
- Alas Singko ng Hapon, Gising Na ang Mga Anghel (1976)
- Bata Pa si Sabel (1976)
- Project: Kill (1976) - Chief Insp. Cruz
- Ursula (1976)
- Markadong Anghel (1976)
- Makamandag si Adora (1976) - The Judge
- Scotch on the Rocks to Remember... Bitter Coffee to Forget (1976)
- Kapangyarihan ni Eva (1977)
- Too Hot to Handle (1977) - District Attorney
- Mag-ingat Ka... Ikaw ang Susunod! (1977)
- Gomburza (1977)
- Pinakasalan Ko ang Ina ng Aking Kapatid (1977)
- Phandora (1977)
- Nananabik (1977)
- Huwag Mong Dungisan ang Pisngi ng Langit (1977)
- Katawang Alabok (1978)
- Roberta (1979)
- Menor de Edad (1979)
- Okey Lang Basta't Kapiling Kita (1979)
- Nangyari sa Kagubatan (1979)
- Bakit May Pag-Ibig Pa? (1979)
- Pacific Inferno (1979) - Fukoshima
- Dalagang Pinagtaksilan ng Panahon, Ang (1979)
- Star (1979)
- Nang Bumuka ang Sampaguita (1980)
- Galing-galing Mo Mrs. Jones, Ang (1980)
- The Children of An Lac (1980, TV Movie) - Dr. Dan
- Taga sa Panahon (1980)
- Langis at Tubig (1980) - The Judge
- The Last Reunion (1980) - Raoul Amante
- Bantay Salakay (1981)
- Tondo Girl (1981)
- Jag Rodnar (1981) - Domingo de Jesus
- Kisapmata (1981) - Sgt. Diosdado Carandang
- Karma (1981) - Psychiatrist
- Waywaya (1982)
- Malikot (1982) - Raffy Almonte
- Friends in Love (1983)
- Jun Parak (1983)
- Paano Ba ang Mangarap? (1983)
- Tatak ng Yakuza (1983)
- Karnal (1983) - Gusting
- Commander Firefox (1983)
- Dapat Ka Bang Mahalin? (1984) - Victor
- Basag ang Pula (1984) - Atty. Abad
- Sa Hirap at Ginhawa (1984) - Abe Ventura
- Ano ang Kulay ng Mukha ng Diyos (1985) - Prison Superintendent
- Mabuhay Ka sa Baril (1986)
- I Love You Mama, I Love You Papa (1986) - Don Lorico Villena
- Maharlika (1987) - Colonel Murai
- Tigershark (1987) - Colonel Barro (final film role)

=== Television ===
- Pangarap ni Buhay (1973–1975)
- Guni Guni (1977–1978)
- Flordeluna (1978–1982)
- Mirasol del Cielo (1986–1987)
