= Clodualdo del Mundo Jr. =

Filipino filmmaker

- Born: March 11, 1948 (age 78); Philippines
- Occupations: Screenwriter, essayist, director
- Years active: 1968–present
- Awards: FAMAS Award for Best Screenplay: *Manila in the Claws of Light (1975); MMFF Award for Best Screenplay: *Kisapmata (1981)

Clodualdo A. del Mundo Jr. (born March 11, 1948) is a Filipino screenwriter, director, and author.

In 1968, he got a Bachelor of Arts degree at the Ateneo de Manila University in 1968 followed by a Master of Arts in radio-television-film in 1974 from University of Kansas and a doctoral degree in communication studies at the University of Iowa in 1994. He headed the communication arts department of De La Salle University from 1976 to 1985 and was a founding member and former chairman of the Manunuri ng Pelikulang Pilipino, and vice-president of the Screenwriters Guild of the Philippines.

Del Mundo is a well-respected figure in the Filipino film industry and has garnered amount of critical acclaim for his body of work during the 1970s and 1980s. Pepot Superstaris the first full-length feature written and directed by del Mundo

Del Mundo has directed documentary films like People Media (1978) and Lupa (1982) and has written Writing for Film (1983), and Philippine Mass Media: A Book of Readings (1986) published by the Communication Foundation for Asia.

Affectionally known as "Doy" to his colleagues, he is the son of famous comic book writer Clodualdo del Mundo Sr. He is married to Dreena Quito. They have one child, Ida Anita.

2.

“In writing a film, one has to be interested in the project. That is a prerequisite. In my case, I try to write the best I could. I work outside the mainstream so I do not get projects often. However, I have a regular job as professor. In that way, I can choose projects I want to write. My two jobs complement each other." (The Cinema, The Daily Tribune Newspaper; The Cinema, Ezine Articles.com)

== Filmography ==
=== As director ===
- 2004: Maid in Singapore (documentary; also producer)
- 2005: Pepot Superstar (also producer)
- 2008: Ehem! Plo: Corruption & Integrity in Philippine Society (video documentary short)
- 2010: Tinitingnan, 'Di Nakikita (video documentary short)
- 2011: Paglipad ng Anghel

=== As screenwriter ===
- 1975: Manila in the Claws of Light (screenplay)
- 1977: Itim (screenplay) (as Doy del Mundo)
- 1977: Sa Piling ng Mga Sugapa (story & screenplay)
- 1980: Kakabakaba Ka Ba? (screenplay) (as Doy del Mundo)
- 1981: Kisapmata (screenplay) (as Doy del Mundo Jr.)
- 1982: Batch '81 (screenplay)
- 1984: 'Merika (story and screenplay)
- 1992: Aliwan Paradise (short)
- 1993: Southern Winds (screenplay)
- 1996: Mulanay: Sa Pusod ng Paraiso (story and screenplay) (as Doy del Mundo)
- 1997: Puerto Princesa
- 1999: Bayaning 3rd World (writer)
- 2000: Markova: Comfort Gay (screenplay)
- 2004: Maid in Singapore (documentary) (screenplay)
- 2005: Pepot Superstar (writer)
- 2011: Paglipad ng Anghel (screenplay)

== Bibliography ==
- Direk: Essays on Filipino Filmmakers (editor, 2019)
- Ang Daigdig ng mga Api: Remembering a Lost Film (2022)

== Awards ==
- 1976: FAMAS Award for Best Screenplay for Manila in the Claws of Light
- 1981: Metro Manila Film Festival Award for Best Screenplay and Best Story for Kisapmata
- 1983: Film Academy of the Philippines Award for Best Screenplay for Batch '81 at the Philippines FAP Awards
- 1983: Gawad Urian Award for Best Screenplay for Batch '81
- 2005: Best Film Award (full length film category) for his film Pepot Artista at the First Cinemalaya Philippine Independent Film Festival
