= Charo Santos-Concio =

Filipino media executive, television actress, and film producer (born 1955)

Charo Santos
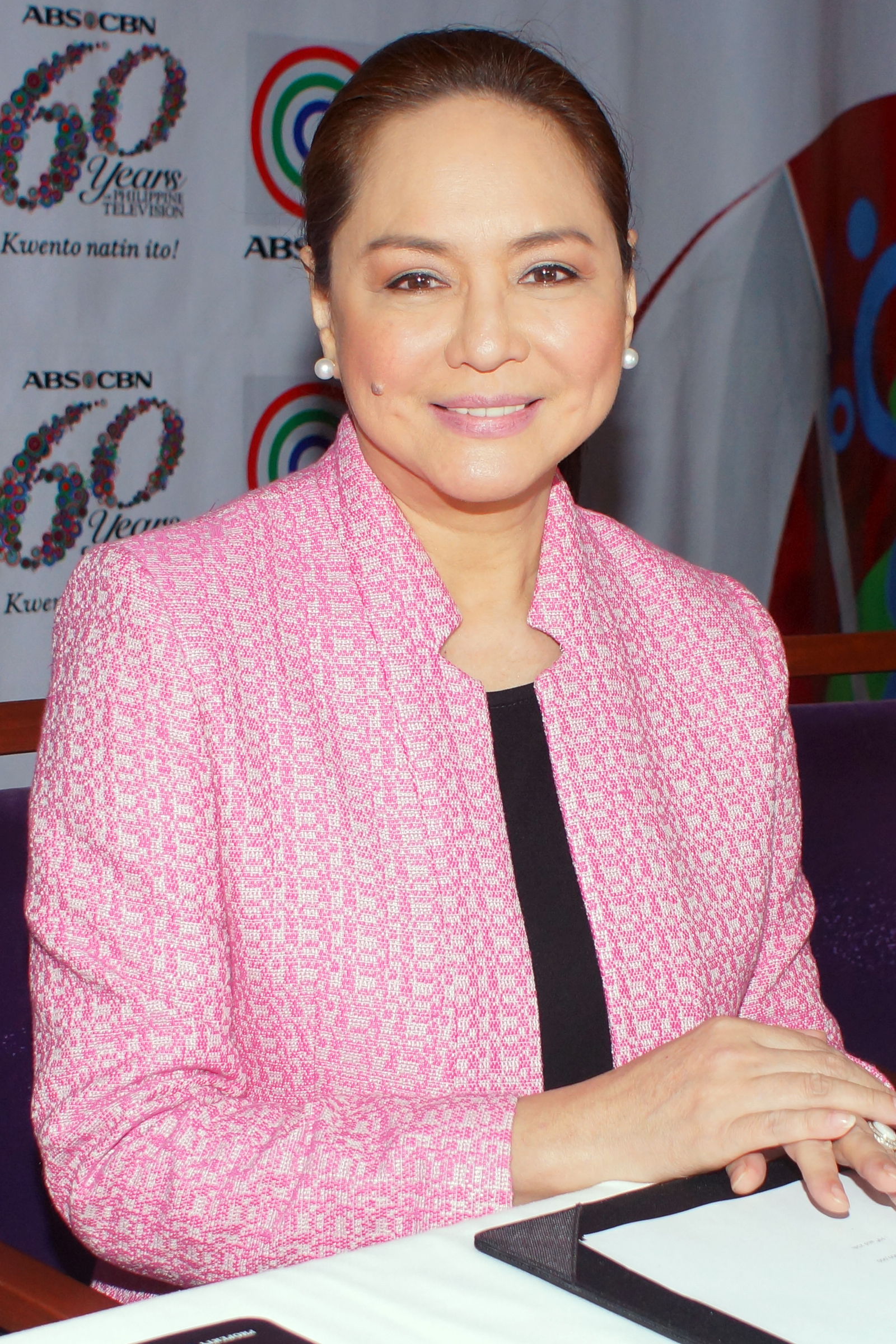
- Santos-Concio in 2014

President of ABS-CBN (Broadcasting) Corporation
- In office March 3, 2008 – December 31, 2015
- Preceded by: Eugenio Lopez III
- Succeeded by: Carlo Katigbak

Personal details
- Born: María Rosario Navarro Santos; October 27, 1955 (age 70) Calapan, Philippines
- Spouse: Cesar Concio Jr. (m. 1982; died 2023)
- Children: 2
- Education: St. Paul College of Manila
- Occupation: Board Member, ABS-CBN (Broadcasting) Corporation (2024–present); Co-founder and talent, Star Magic; Film and television producer Host, Maalaala Mo Kaya (1991–2022, 2025)

María Rosario "Charo" Navarro Santos-Concio (Tagalog: [ˈtʃaɾɔ ˈsɐntɔs ˈkɔnʃo]; born October 27, 1955) is a Filipino actress. As a media executive, she served as the president (2008–2015), chief executive officer (2013–2015), and board member (2024–present) of ABS-CBN Corporation, a media company under Lopez Holdings Corporation owned by the López family of Iloilo, and executive producer of its production and distribution division ABS-CBN Studios during her company presidency. She is also one of the company's advisors. Santos-Concio plays a role in TV and film production in the Philippines and as such she is one of the co-founders and talent of Star Magic and the host of Maalaala Mo Kaya, the longest running television drama anthology in the Philippines.

== Early life and family ==
María Rosario Navarro Santos was born on October 27, 1955 to Winifredo Santos, a physician, and Nora Navarro-Santos, with children Millet, the wife of Edgar Mortiz, Suzanne Santos, Malou N. Santos, Joey Santos and Mae Santos.

She grew up in Calapan, Oriental Mindoro, where she was discovered by the famous 1970s fashion designer Rikki Jimenez, who asked her to participate in fashion shows and was crowned Miss Calapan. She first met her would-be husband Cesar Concio Jr. (born 1931) when she was hired as a print ad model for his company. She later married him amid a 24-year age gap, at an intimate ceremony held at Pebble Beach, California, on November 9, 1982. They have two sons together, Cesar Francis and Raphael Martin. Talia and Julia are the daughters of Francis and wife Carla. Julia, Talia and Basti are their grandchildren. Luca is the son of Martin Concio and his wife Ystacey. Concio Jr. got infected by COVID-19 and died on October 7, 2023, at age 91.

== Career ==
Santos-Concio was first noticed by the media as Baron Travel Girl in 1976. She also worked as a production assistant pre-martial law with Radio Philippines Network.

In the 1980s, Santos-Concio produced a number of films, such as Oro, Plata, Mata and Himala under the Experimental Cinema of the Philippines. She also was the creative force behind the productions of Vanguard Films and Vision Films before moving to Regal Films.

Santos-Concio's career as an actress began in 1976, when she starred in the lead role of Mike de Leon's directorial debut film Itim. She later won an award for her performance in the film during the 1977 Asian Film Festival. She was critically acclaimed for her performance in Lino Brocka's 1990 film Gumapang Ka sa Lusak, which won several awards including a Best Director FAMAS for Brocka. Santos has also won four FAMAS Award nominations. She obtained two Best Actress nominations for Pag-Ibig na Walang Dangal (1980) and Kontrobersiyal (1981) and Best Supporting Actress nominations for Gumapang Ka Sa Lusak (1990) and Ms. Dolora X (1993). She also earned three Gawad Urian nominations for The Woman Who Left, Gumapang Ka Sa Lusak, and Itim.

In 1987, while working for Regal Films and hosting Eat Bulaga! on RPN, she was invited to join the new ABS-CBN, which had reopened on September 14, 1986. Santos-Concio was promoted from Production Manager, to Program Director to Executive Vice-president. She is credited in the production of several phenomenal television series of ABS-CBN including Esperanza, Mula Sa Puso, Pangako Sa 'Yo, and Kay Tagal Kang Hinintay. Her film background played an important role in the creation of Star Cinema. She is also behind the establishment of Star Magic as one of its co-founders in 1988 and longest-running Philippine TV drama anthology program Maalaala Mo Kaya, which she has hosted since it premiered in 1991.

On December 26, 2007, the Film Academy of the Philippines (FAP) awarded Santos-Concio with the Manuel de Leon Award for her work in the industry.

On March 1, 2008, she was appointed as the fifth president of ABS-CBN and in charge of the company's total business portfolio, making her the first woman president of the media company and its parent Lopez Holdings Corporation and taking over from interim president Eugenio López III. She took over as CEO after López retired on December 31, 2015.

On January 1, 2016, Santos-Concio stepped down as president and CEO of ABS-CBN Corporation and was succeeded by Carlo Katigbak, the chief operating officer of the company at that time. She is currently the president of ABS-CBN University.

Since 2024, Santos-Concio is one of the board members of ABS-CBN.

== Awards and recognitions ==
- 2025 Doctor of Humanities, Honoris Causa, St. Paul University Manila
- 2015 Fleur-de-lis Award, St. Paul University Manila
- 2014 Female Makabata Star, Anak TV Awards
- 2014 Gold Stevie Award in the Female Executive of the Year in Asia, Australia, or New Zealand category, Stevie Awards for Women in Business
- 2014 Asian Media Woman of the Year, ContentAsia
- 2014 Woman Achiever for Tourism and International Understanding, 24th SKAL Tourism Personality Awards
- 2014 Woman of the Year for the Philippines, 1st Asia-Pacific Stevie Awards
- 2014 FitzGerald Belfry Lifetime Achievement of The Year, 94th Las Familias Unidas FitzGerald Awards
- 2013 OFW Gawad Parangal, Kapisanan ng mga Kamag-anak ng Migranteng Manggagawang Pilipino, Inc. (KAKAMMPI)
- 2013 Anak TV Seal Award, Anak TV Awards
- 2013 Golden Wheel Award for Corporate Media Management, Rotary International District 3780 and the Quezon City government's The Rotary Golden Wheel Awards
- 2013 Kapisanan ng mga Brodkaster ng Pilipinas (KBP) Lifetime Achievement Award, 21st Golden Dove Awards
- 2013 25-year Service Award, ABS-CBN Corporation's Kapamilya Awards, 2013 Tourism Award (For Media Broadcast), Rotary Club of Manila's 9th Tourism Awards
- 2012 Gawad Tanglaw Sa Sining ng Telebisyon, 10th Gawad Tanglaw Awards
- 2012 Outstanding Paulinian, St. Paul University Manila
- 2011 Female Makabata Star, Anak TV Awards
- 2011 Woman Super Achiever Award, CMO Asia's Woman Super Achiever Awards
- 2011 Lifetime Achievement Award, Golden Screen TV Awards
- 2011 Gawad Parangal, Quezon City Government's Gawad Parangal
- 2010 CEO Communication Excellence in Organizations Award, International Association of Business Communicators (IABC) CEO Excel Awards
- 2010 Anak TV Seal Award, Anak TV Awards
- 2007 Manuel de Leon Award, Film Academy of the Philippines (FAP) Awards
- 2007 Ading Fernando Lifetime Achievement Award, 21st Philippine Movie Press Club (PMPC) Star Awards for Television
- 1977 Best Actress for the film Itim, Asian Film Festival

== Filmography ==
=== Film ===
==== As an actress ====
Year	Title	Role	Note(s)	Ref.
1976	Itim	Teresa		
1977	Tisoy!	Maribubut		
1978	Camerino			
1979	High School Circa '65			
1979	Boy Kodyak			
1979	Sino'ng Pipigil sa Pagpatak ng Ulan?	Ikuko Susuki		
1979	Mahal Kong Taksil			
1979	Durugin si Totoy Bato			
1979	Ang Alamat ni Julian Makabayan			
1980	4 Na Maria			
1980	Aguila	Atty. Monica Salvación "Sally" Llamas de Águila		
1980	Disco Madhouse	Maya		
1980	Kakabakaba Ka Ba?	Melanie		
1980	Pag-ibig Na Walang Dangal			
1980	Brutal	Clara		
1981	Ermitaño			
1981	Kontrobersyal	Mers Madsen		
1981	Dakpin si... Pusa (Ang Kilabot)			
1981	Lukso ng Dugo	Aklang		
1981	Kisapmata	Milagros Carandang	Also producer	
1982	My Juan en Only	Arcadia "Akang" Policarpia		
1984	Mga Batang Yagit			
1984	Hindi Mo Ako Kayang Tapakan	Doña Anastacia "Anna" Hernandez vda. de Tuazon		
1985	Uhaw Na Uhaw			
1987	Batas sa Aking Kamay			
1987	Paano Kung Wala Ka Na?	Doris		
1987	Vigilante			
1989	Wanted: Pamilya Banal	Lorena Banal		
1990	Gumapang Ka sa Lusak	Rowena Guatlo		
1990	Island of Desire			
1990	Kapag Langit ang Humatol	Dorina	Also executive producer	
1991	Pangako ng Puso			
1991	Kailan Ka Magiging Akin	Leila Gatchalian	Also executive producer	
1991	Valentin Zapanta, Alyas Ninong: Huling Kilabot ng Tondo	Nana Chedeng		
1991	Dinampot Ka Lang sa Putik			
1992	Lakay			
1993	Ms. Dolora X: Ipagtatanggol Kita			
1994	Maalaala Mo Kaya: The Movie	Narrator		
1999	Esperanza: The Movie	Isabel Salgado		
2016	The Woman Who Left	Horacia Somorostro / Renata	Original title: Ang Babaeng Humayo	
2018	Eerie	Mother Superior Alice		
2019	The Mall, the Merrier!	Herself		
2021	Whether the Weather Is Fine	Norma		
2025	Only We Know	Elizabeth "Betty" Guevarra		
TBA	Knock Three Times			

==== As producer only ====
Year	Title	Note(s)	Ref.
1981	Batuigas II: Pasukuin si Waway		
1985	Hindi Nahahati ang Langit		
1985	Sangley Point Robbery		
1987	Operation: Get Victor Corpus, the Rebel Soldier		

=== Television ===
Year	Title	Role	Note(s)	Ref.
1984	Charo	Herself / various		
1986–1987	Eat Bulaga!	Herself / co-host		
1991–2022; 2025	Maalaala Mo Kaya	Herself / narrator		
1997–1999	Esperanza	Isabel Bermudez-Salgado		
2010	May Bukas Pa	Virgin Mary		
2018	Since I Found You	Elvie Capistrano		
2019–2020	Starla	Lola Tala		
2022	FPJ's Ang Probinsyano	Ramona		
2023–2026	FPJ's Batang Quiapo	Matilde "Tindeng" Asuncion		
2024–2025	It's Showtime	Herself / guest		
2026	Sun Chaser	Lola (voice)		

=== Music videos ===
Year	Title	Role
2026	Unang Kilig (with Bini)	Herself

== Notes ==
Santos-Concio's full name is unclear as her birth was registered prior to July 1956 birth registration where the middle name or maternal family name was implemented.

Preceded by Eugenio L. López III	ABS-CBN chief executive officer January 1, 2013 – December 31, 2015	Succeeded by Carlo L. Katigbak
Preceded by Eugenio L. López III	ABS-CBN President; March 3, 2008 – December 31, 2015	Succeeded by Carlo L. Katigbak
