= Kakabakaba Ka Ba? =

1980 musical comedy film by Mike de Leon

- Poster of the restored version, designed by Justin Besana
- Directed by: Mike de Leon
- Written by: Mike de Leon; Clodualdo del Mundo Jr.; Raquel Villavicencio
- Produced by: Encarnacion de Leon; Manuel de Leon; Narcisa de Leon
- Starring: Christopher de Leon; Charo Santos; Jay Ilagan; Sandy Andolong; Boboy Garovillo
- Cinematography: Rody Lacap
- Edited by: Ike Jarlego, Jr.
- Music by: Lorrie Ilustre
- Production company: LVN Pictures
- Distributed by: D'Wonder Films; ABS-CBN Film Productions (restored version)
- Release date: August 8, 1980
- Running time: 106 minutes
- Country: Philippines
- Languages: Filipino; English; Philippine Hokkien; Japanese; Hiligaynon; Ilocano

Kakabakaba Ka Ba? (English: Does Your Heart Beat Faster?) is a 1980 Filipino musical comedy film directed by Mike de Leon from a screenplay he co-wrote with Clodualdo del Mundo Jr., and Raquel Villavicencio. The film stars Christopher de Leon, Charo Santos, Jay Ilagan, and Sandy Andolong as two pairs of lovers who accidentally find themselves in the middle of a conflict between rivaling Japanese and Chinese drug syndicates. It also features Apo Hiking Society members Boboy Garovillo, Danny Javier, and Jim Paredes, Johnny Delgado, Armida Siguion-Reyna, Leo Martinez, and Nanette Inventor.

Produced by LVN Pictures and distributed by D'Wonder Films, the film, theatrically released on August 8, 1980, has been viewed as a satirical commentary on foreign control of the Philippine economy.

In 2015, the film was digitally restored by the ABS-CBN Film Restoration Project.

== Plot ==
=== Cold open ===
The cold open features several attempts by Onota (Boboy Garovillo), a member of the Japanese yakuza, to smuggle contraband into the Philippines. In 1964, he arrived at Manila International Airport but was denied entry into the Philippines after customs discovered that he was smuggling diamonds hidden inside a Japanese doll. Five years later, Onota, disguised as a hippie, attempts to smuggle money hidden in his guitar but is caught once again. In 1976, another failed attempt sees Onota disguised as a kimono-wearing Japanese woman who is caught smuggling opium inside his kimono sash.

=== Main plot ===
In the present, Onota is given one more chance by his boss, the Japanese Master (George Javier). His mission is to once again fly to Manila, this time with a cassette tape that carries some contraband. On his flight, Onota slips the cassette tape into the pocket of Johnny (Christopher de Leon), an unassuming Filipino returning home. The contraband is finally able to go through Philippine customs, but Onota has to retrieve it from Johnny.

Soon, Johnny, his long-time interest Melanie (Charo Santos), and their friends Nonong (Jay Ilagan) and Nancy (Sandy Andolong), find themselves continuously harassed by various groups who are interested in getting the cassette tape. Aside from Onota, there is Madame Lily (Armida Siguion-Reyna), who heads a Chinese crime syndicate, as well as the mysterious Fr. Blanco (Leo Martinez).

A series of hijinks ensues. Johnny and his friends meet with Santacruzan (Danny Javier). They discover that the cassette tape contains opium, which Nonong, Nancy, and Santacruzan take.

Eventually, the foursome of Johnny, Melanie, Nonong, and Nancy travels to Baguio in disguise as priests and nuns. They uncover a plot by the Japanese syndicate, led locally by Pinoy Master (Johnny Delgado), for the large-scale distribution of opium through communion wafers to control the Filipino population. The group can foil the scheme in a musical extravaganza. The film ends with the two couples marrying in a joint ceremony.

== Cast ==
- Christopher de Leon as Johnny
- Charo Santos as Melanie
- Jay Ilagan as Nonong
- Sandy Andolong as Nancy
- Boboy Garovillo as Onota
- Johnny Delgado as Pinoy Master
- Armida Siguion-Reyna as Ching Chao Kee alias Madame Lily
- Leo Martinez as Fr. Blanco
- Moody Diaz as Aling Melody / Virgie
- Bert Miranda as Chinese bodyguard 1
- Tommy Yap as Chinese bodyguard 2
- Joe Jardi as Eutiquiano Awitin alias Wagner
- Danny Javier as Santacruzan
- George Javier as Japanese Master
- Nanette Inventor as Sonia Dela Cruz, the Mother Superior
- Jim Paredes as Conductor
- New Minstrels as Band

== Release ==
=== Restoration ===
In 2015, the film was digitally restored and remastered by the ABS-CBN Film Restoration Project in cooperation with L'Immagine Ritrovata in Bologna, Italy. The restored version premiered on December 9, 2015, at Trinoma mall to close the 10th Cinema One Originals festival. The theme of the Cinema One Originals festival that year was "Kakaiba ka ba?" a play on the title of de Leon's film.

The digitally restored version of the film was screened at the 30th Tokyo International Film Festival in 2017 as part of the Cross Cut Asia program. Program director Kenji Ishizaka first saw the film in 1991 and explained his decision in choosing to include the film in the line-up: "First of all, it's a high-quality musical. To look at your own country, through an outsider's point of view, is always interesting. The Yakuza character is depicted in a caricaturish manner, but that's good for us to see. It's a comedy." Ishizaka added that he thought the film should be watched by younger generations.

The film was released on Blu-ray by Kani Releasing in 2023, with the English title Will Your Heart Beat Faster? The release also included Gregorio Fernandez's 1947 film Miss Philippines and de Leon's 1992 short film Aliwan Paradise.

== Reception ==
=== Accolades ===
Year	Award	Category	Nominee(s)	Result
1981	FAMAS Awards	Best Picture	Kakabakaba Ka Ba?	Nominated
1981	FAMAS Awards	Best Director	Mike de Leon	Nominated
1981	FAMAS Awards	Best Supporting Actor	Johnny Delgado	Nominated
1981	FAMAS Awards	Best Editing	Ike Jarlego, Jr.	Won
1981	FAMAS Awards	Best Sound	Ramon Reyes	Won
1981	Gawad Urian Awards	Best Picture (Pinakamahusay na Pelikula)	Kakabakaba Ka Ba?	Nominated
1981	Gawad Urian Awards	Best Direction (Pinakamahusay na Direksyon)	Mike de Leon	Won
1981	Gawad Urian Awards	Best Supporting Actor (Pinakamahusay na Pangalawang Aktor)	Johnny Delgado	Won
1981	Gawad Urian Awards	Best Supporting Actor (Pinakamahusay na Pangalawang Aktor)	Boboy Garovillo	Nominated
1981	Gawad Urian Awards	Best Supporting Actress (Pinakamahusay na Pangalawang Aktres)	Nanette Inventor	Nominated
1981	Gawad Urian Awards	Best Supporting Actress (Pinakamahusay na Pangalawang Aktres)	Armida Siguion-Reyna	Nominated
1981	Gawad Urian Awards	Best Screenplay (Pinakamahusay na Dulang Pampelikula)	Mike De Leon, Clodualdo del Mundo, Jr., and Raquel Villavicencio	Nominated
1981	Gawad Urian Awards	Best Editing (Pinakamahusay na Editing)	Ike Jarlego, Jr.	Won
1981	Gawad Urian Awards	Best Cinematography (Pinakamahusay na Sinematograpiya)	Rody Lacap	Nominated
1981	Gawad Urian Awards	Best Production Design (Pinakamahusay na Disenyong Pamproduksiyon)	Raquel Villavicencio	Nominated
1981	Gawad Urian Awards	Best Music (Pinakamahusay na Musika)	Lorrie Ilustre	Won
1981	Gawad Urian Awards	Best Sound (Pinakamahusay na Tunog)	Ramon Reyes	Won

== See also ==
- Mike de Leon
- Christopher De Leon
- Charo Santos
- Jay Ilagan
- Sandy Andolong
- Johnny Delgado
- Apo Hiking Society
