= Clodualdo del Mundo Sr. =

Filipino writer (1911–1977)

- Born: September 11, 1911; Santa Cruz, Manila, Philippine Islands
- Died: October 5, 1977 (aged 66); Manila, Philippines
- Occupations: Comic book writer, screenwriter, essayist, journalist
- Years active: 1936–1977
- Children: Clodualdo del Mundo Jr.

Clodualdo del Mundo Sr. (September 11, 1911 – October 5, 1977) was a Filipino novelist, playwright, essayist, short story writer, journalist, screenwriter, teacher, critic. Many comics fans know him as the prolific writer of komiks (Philippine comics) through Liwayway and Ace Publications.

He was also one of the most ardent supporters of the Filipino language (Pilipino), the national language of the Philippines and worked tirelessly for its promotion as a literary language.

== Beginnings ==
Clodualdo del Mundo was born in Santa Cruz, Manila. His parents were Mariano del Mundo, a sculptor from Bocaue, Bulacan; and Remigia Legaspi of Sampaloc, Manila. A graduate of Mapa High School, del Mundo obtained a degree in Associate in Arts from Far Eastern College (now Far Eastern University), and a Bachelor of Science in Education degree from the National Teachers' College. Del Mundo spent a few years studying law at the Philippine Law School, and fine arts at the University of the Philippines.

== Literature ==
Del Mundo was at the forefront of literary organizations. In 1936, he co-founded and became president of "Panitikan", an avant-garde group of college writers in Tagalog. He also became president of "Ilaw ng Bayan" in 1937, and a member of "Ilaw at Panitik" in 1938. He provided an active voice in the name of the national language when he became a member of "Taliba ng Inang Wika" (TANIW) in 1955, and its president from 1967 to 1972. His name was associated with various magazines as associate editor, managing editor or editor. Among these magazines were Alitaptap, Orient Digest, Nautilus, Halakhak, Mabuhay, Aliwan, Paru-Paro, Daigdig and Liwayway.

Del Mundo continued to write literary pieces. During his later years at Liwayway, he focused his work on the "tanaga", a form of Pilipino poem, with four verses and seven syllables for each verse. A small space in Liwayway was reserved for del Mundo's "Makabagong Tanaga", and he produced a total of 283 of these short poems. He was editorial director of Liwayway when he died on October 5, 1977.

His life as a writer was a constant struggle between literary writing and popular writing for the mass media, particularly radio and komiks.

== Radio ==
In radio, del Mundo is most remembered for his Prinsipe Amante, which was aired from 1949 to 1953. Rooted in folklore and the comedy, it was made into a film by Lamberto Avellana becoming a box-office success. It also inspired comics adaptations by Malang Santos and Alfredo Alcala. Del Mundo wrote countless other plays on radio, including biblical plays during Lenten seasons.

== Films ==
He works were also the basis of a great number of films particularly in the 1950s and the 1960s in which he was credited as writer and as screenwriter. He is well-respected figure in the Filipino film industry and has garnered amount of critical acclaim for his body of work.

== Komiks ==
In "komiks", del Mundo is remembered as one of the prolific writers during the Golden Years of komiks in the Philippines with the entry of Ace Publications in 1947 and the publication of Pilipino Komiks. Through the 1950s, Ace Publications komiks – Pilipino, Hiwaga, Espesyal and Tagalog Klasiks enjoyed huge popularity. Clodualdo del Mundo was the most prolific (other notables being Mars Ravelo, Pablo S. Gomez, and Francisco V. Coching).

Leading illustrators at that time were Francisco V. Coching, Nestor Redondo, Alfredo Alcala and Fred Carrillo. Most of the komiks stories by del Mundo were illustrated by Fred Carrillo. This long collaboration produced works in genres including social drama (Malvarosa, Kadenang Putik), costume drama (Kapitan Bagwis, Pitong Sagisag), action (Ripleng de Rapido, Paltik, Asintado), and science-fiction (Tuko sa Madre Kakaw, Zarex).

For about two decades, del Mundo provided a rich resource of stories for movie producers. Many of his stories were produced by LVN and Premiere Productions. In 1960, Kadenang Putik, produced by Premiere, was awarded the Filipino Academy of Movie Arts and Sciences FAMAS Awards trophy for best story.

Also noteworthy among del Mundo's works in komiks medium was his adaptation of Jose Rizal's Noli Me Tangere.

During the height of the popularity of komiks-magazines, del Mundo and his colleagues formed an organization to oversee the komiks industry and to underscore the responsibility of this mass medium. In 1956, the APEPCOM (Association of Publishers and Editors of Philippine Comics Magazines) was formed. In the 1960s, del Mundo served as its president.

Also known as Clod del Mundo, he is the father of the Filipino university professor, film director, producer and screenwriter Clodualdo del Mundo Jr. and the father to actor/model Jesus 'Jet' del Mundo, who starred as "Israel" in the 1965 film Ang Daigdig Ng Mga Api, which won the 1965 FAMAS Awards trophy for Best Picture.

== Works ==
- 1947: Ali Mudin (Liwaway)
- 1948: Prinsipe Paris (Pilipino Komiks)
- 1948-1949: Prinsipe Adonis (Pilipino Komiks)
- 1949: Mahiwagang Kastilyo (Paruparo)
- 1949: Ang Ulilang Anghel (Paruparo)
- 1949: Prinsesa Basahan (Paruparo)
- 1949: Prinsipe Binggo (Pilipino Komiks)
- 1950: Buhay ng mga Poon (Tagalog Klasiks)
- 1950-1951: Prinsipe Amante (Aksiyon Komiks)
- 1950-1951: Birtud (Liwayway)
- 1950-1951: Kapitan Bagwis (Liwayway)
- 1951: Kerubin (Liwayway)
- 1952: Texas (Pilipino Komiks)
- 1952: Munting Koronel (Liwayway)
- 1952: Babaing Mandirigma (Pilipino Komiks)
- 1952: Quo Vadis (Tagalog Klasiks)
- 1952-1953: Diluvio (Pilipino Komiks)
- 1952-1953: Hercules (Pilipino Komiks)
- 1952-1953: Solitaryo (Espesyal Komiks)
- 1953: Paladin (Liwayway)
- 1953-1954: Binibining Pirata (Espesyal Komiks)
- 1953-1954: Damong Ligaw (Pilipino Komiks)
- 1954: Nagkita si Kerubin at si Tulisang Pugot (Hiwaga Komiks)
- 1954-1955: Eskrimador (Hiwaga Komiks)
- 1954-1955: Paltik (Pilipino Komiks)
- 1954-1955: Salamangkero (Espesyal Komiks)
- 1954-1956: Everlasting (Tagalog Klasiks)
- 1955-1956: Senyorita de Kampanilya (Pilipino Komiks)
- 1956-1957: Conde de Amor (Hiwaga Komiks)
- 1956-1957: Haring Espada (Hiwaga Komiks)
- 1956-1957: Kamay ni Cain (Pilipino Komiks)
- 1956-1957: Kayumangging Krisantemo (Espesyal Komiks)
- 1957-1958: Zarex (Pilipino Komiks)
- 1957-1958: Malvarosa (Espesyal Komiks)
- 1958: Tuko sa Madre Kakaw (Hiwaga Komiks)
- 1958-1959: Asintado (Espesyal Komiks)
- 1958-1959: Binhi ng Puso (Pilipino Komiks)
- 1959: Apat na Anino (Pilipino Komiks)
- 1959: Nakausap Ko ang Diyos (Hiwaga Komiks)
- 1959-1960: Gitarang Ginto (Espesyal Komiks)
- 1959-1960: Kadenang Putik (Pilipino Komiks)
- 1960: Sandakot na Alabok (Espesyal Komiks)
- 1960: Dimasupil (Tagalog Klasiks)
- 1960-1961: Karugtong ng Kahapon (Tagalog Klasiks)
- 1960-1961: Pitong Sagisag (Pilipino Komiks)
- 1960-1961: Nawaglit na Langit (Espesyal Komiks)
- 1961-1962: Apat na Agimat (Pilipino Komiks)
- 1961-1962: Sindak! (Hiwaga Komiks)
- 1962: Prinsesang Mandirigma (Espesyal Komiks)
- 1962-1963: Sutlang Maskara (Hiwaga Komiks)
- 1962-1963: 29 (Veinte Nueve) (Tagalog Klasiks)
- 1962-1963: Asyang ng La Loma (Espesyal Komiks)
- 1962-1963: Ripleng de Rapido (Pilipino Komiks)
- 1963: Magnong Mandurukot (Liwayway)
- 1963: Riple .77 (Pinoy Komiks)
- 1963-1964: Maskarang Itim (Holiday Komiks)
- 1964: Apat na Espada (Kislap Komiks)
- 1964: Takas sa Morge (Holiday Komiks)
- 1964: Upeng Ulila (Pinoy Komiks)
- 1964-1965: Alyas Agimat (Liwayway)
- 1964-1965: Anak ni Prinsipe Amante (Pilipino Komiks)
- 1964-1965: Mary Martires (Kislap Komiks)
- 1964-1965: Simbilis ng Ipo-Ipo (Pioneer Komiks)
- 1964-1965: Villa Venganza (Espesyal Komiks)
- 1964-1966: Boy King (Pinoy Komiks)
- 1965-1966: Joe Safari (Pinoy Klasiks)
- 1965-1966: Kid Sister (Pioneer Komiks)
- 1965-1966: Kilabot ng Persia (Pilipino Komiks)
- 1966: Duke de Alba (Liwayway)
- 1966: Impakta Vengadora (Liwayway)
- 1966: Planet Man (Liwayway)
- 1966: Katawan at Kaluluwa (Pinoy Komiks)
- 1966: Mataas na Lupa (Kislap Komiks)
- 1966: Sideshow Girl (Holiday Komiks)
- 1966: Walang Bituin sa Langit (Tagalog Klasiks)
- 1966-1967: Mga Taghoy sa Hatinggabi (Hiwaga Komiks)
- 1966-1968: Brix Virgo (Pilipino Komiks)
- 1967-1968: Double Agent (Pioneer Komiks)
- 1968: Paglalakbay sa Silim (Liwayway)
- 1968: Black Treasure (Hiwaga Komiks)
- 1968: Dragona (Top Komiks)
- 1968: Dyenina (Holiday Komiks)
- 1968: Nasa Balintataw (Pinoy Komiks)
- 1968: Noli Me Tangere (Zoom Komiks)
- 1968-1969: Gorilla Man (Zoom Komiks)
- 1968-1969: Katapat ng Langit (Kislap Komiks)
- 1968-1969: Lex Laureado (Pioneer Komiks)
- 1969: Bruhilda (Liwayway)
- 1969: Fashion Model (Sex-See Komiks)
- 1969: Flash Dodo (Bold Komiks)
- 1969: Sphinx(Pinoy Klasiks)
- 1969-1970: Captain Zing (Eba at Adan Komiks)
- 1969-1970: Erotik (Bikini Komiks)
- 1970-1971: Hello, Mrs. Abril (Liwayway)
- 1970-1972: Hari ng Mga Stuntmen (Eba at Adan Starlight Komiks)
- 1972-1973: Gimbal ng Bayan (Starlight Mini Magazine)
- 1974: Lawin Vengador (Liwayway)

(Source: Komiklopedia - Clodualdo del Mundo)

== Filmography ==
Screenwriter

- 1949: Prinsipe Paris (story)
- 1950: Prinsipe Amante (screenplay)
- 1952: Texas (Ang Manok Na Nagsasalita) (screenplay)
- 1953: Munting Koronel (writer)
- 1953: Hercules (writer)
- 1954: Nagkita si Kerubin at si Tulisang Pugot (story)
- 1954: Paladin (story) (as Clod del Mundo)
- 1955: Eskrimador (writer) (as Clod del Mundo)
- 1956: Zarex (story)
- 1957: Kahariang bato (as Clod Del Mundo)
- 1957: Conde de amor
- 1958: Malvarosa (story)
- 1959: Tuko sa Madre Kakaw (story)
- 1960: Kadenang Putik (story)
- 1961: Luis Latigo (story)
- 1961: Pitong Sagisag (story)
- 1962: Apat na Agimat (story)
- 1962: Prinsesang Mandirigma (story)
- 1963: Ripleng de Rapido (story)
- 1963: Asyang ng La Loma (story)

== Awards ==
- 1961: FAMAS award for Best Screenplay for Kadenang Putik at the FAMAS Awards
