= Irma Adlawan =

Filipino actress (born 1962)

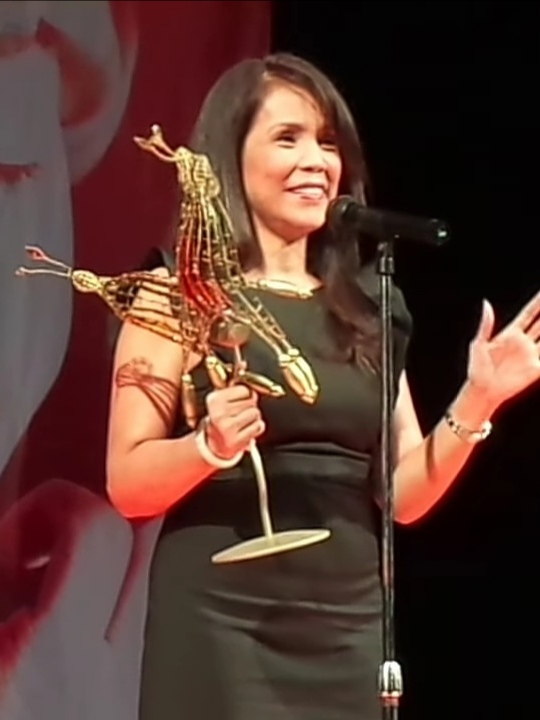
- Adlawan in 2013
- Born: Irma Santonil Adlawan; March 7, 1962 (age 64); Tondo, Manila, Philippines
- Education: St. Mary Magdalene School, University of the Philippines
- Occupation: Actress
- Years active: 1978–present
- Agent: Viva Artists Agency (since 2021)
- Notable work: Transit; Oro
- Spouse: Dennis Marasigan (separated)
- Children: 4

Irma Santonil Adlawan (born March 7, 1962) is a Filipino actress of stage and screen. She began her career on stage with the drama company Tanghalang Pilipino in the 1990s and later expanded into acting through independent and mainstream productions. Adlawan has received accolades including four Aliw Awards, a FAMAS Award, a Metro Manila Film Festival Award, and a Young Critics Circle, in addition to nominations for five Gawad Urian and three Luna Awards.

== Early life and education ==
Adlawan was born in Tondo, Manila, the daughter of Conrada Santonil, a housewife, and Pedro Adlawan, a retired colonel. She attended St. Mary Magdalene (Parochial) School Inc. in Kawit, Cavite and became a student of Speech and Drama at the University of the Philippines–Diliman, having transferred from its Manila campus.

== Career ==
=== 1983–1999: Early career ===
Her first stage role was Helena from Shakespeare's A Midsummer Night's Dream, which she performed for Dulaang UP in 1983 under the direction of its founder, Tony Mabesa. She became a regular of Dulaang UP, starring in productions including Chekhov's Three Sisters, Betti's The Queen and the Rebels, Fay and Michael Kanin's Rashomon, and Molière's The Misanthrope, and other plays.

Adlawan became a member of Tanghalang Pilipino's Actors Company from 1991 to 1998, performing in stage plays in roles including: a Chinese film producer based on Regal Films matriarch Mother Lily Monteverde in Dennis Marasigan's Ang Buhay Ay Pelikula; Zafira in Francisco Balagtas' Orosman at Zafira; Sisa in the Cayabyab-Lumbera musical adaptation of José Rizal's Noli Me Tangere; and Teodora Alonso in Nonon Padilla and Rene O. Villanueva's Teodora. For Ang Buhay Ay Pelikula she was cited as Best Actress of the Year by the Young Critics Circle in 1992, while for Teodora her performance as the mother of Philippine hero José Rizal was praised by National Artist for Dance Leonor Orosa-Goquingco for "[accomplishing] her histrionic feat, her splendid tour de force [with such ease, passion, range, verisimilitude and transparency]."

=== 2000–2013: Expansion into acting on screen ===
Adlawan's early mainstream film roles include a victim of incestuous rape in Jeffrey Jeturian's Tuhog in 2001, and a public school teacher in Mga Munting Tinig in 2002, both of which earned her a Best Supporting Actress nomination at the Gawad Urian Awards. In 2005, during the advent of digital cinema, she starred in three independent films: ICU Bed #7, where she played Eddie Garcia's daughter; Sa North Diversion Road, which had been adapted for film and had her reprising her role from mid-90s theatre alongside John Arcilla, where they played 10 different couples dealing with infidelity; and Mga Pusang Gala, based on the Palanca award-winning screenplay by Rody Vera and Jun Lana, where she played the role of Marta, a single middle-aged advertising practitioner. She received Best Actress nods for her performances in Sa North and Mga Pusang Gala. She continued to act in indies, playing lead and supporting roles from 2006 onwards. Her performance as Aling Carmen in Ataul: For Rent in 2007 earned her a FAMAS Best Supporting Actress award.

Her early television credits include appearances in Cecile Guidote-Alvarez's Balintataw, Behn Cervantes' Angkan, and Mario O'Hara's Mama. She later appeared frequently in primetime teleseryes including Sa Dulo Ng Walang Hanggan, Kay Tagal Kang Hinintay, Mga Anghel na Walang Langit, and Encantadia. In 2006, she was cast in the recurring role of Imelda Magsaysay, mother of Celine Magsaysay (played by Anne Curtis), in the ABS-CBN teleserye Maging Sino Ka Man. Her other TV credits include Clara Rivero in Lobo, Margarita Fortalejo-Cervantes in Precious Hearts Romances Presents: Kristine in 2010, Mantal in Amaya in 2011, and guest appearances in ABS-CBN and GMA Network's respective drama anthologies, Maalaala Mo Kaya and Magpakailanman.

While appearing in teleseryes and independent films, Adlawan continued to perform on stage, and in 2008 she was inducted into the Aliw Awards Hall of Fame for her three Best Stage Actress wins in 100 Hundred Songs of Mary Helen Fee, Speaking in Tongues, and Ang Pokpok ng Ohio. That same year, she starred in Tanghalang Pilipino's production of David Henry Hwang's The Golden Child and alternated with Missy Maramara as Desdemona in Tanghalang Ateneo's adaptation of Shakespeare's Othello. In 2009, she portrayed Candida Marasigan—which she reprised four more times in the next five years—in Nick Joaquin's A Portrait of the Artist as Filipino in a staging by Repertory Philippines.

Also in 2009, Adlawan starred in Alvin Yapan's Cinemalaya film Ang Panggagahasa Kay Fe, for which she received another Best Actress nomination at the Gawad Urian Awards. She also reprised her role as Baby Magtalas, the mother of Laida Magtalas (played by Sarah Geronimo) in the sequel of A Very Special Love, You Changed My Life. In 2010, she starred in the Cinemalaya film Vox Populi, playing Connie de Gracia, a politician's daughter running for office. In the following years, she returned to Dulaang UP by way of Wilfrido Ma. Guerrero's Forsaken House and again reprised her role as Baby Magtalas in It Takes a Man and a Woman. She appeared in ABS-CBN's Got to Believe as Joaquin's nanny, Yaya Puring and Be Careful With My Heart as Vicky Reyes, Maya's adviser. She played corrupt public school head Principal May in Titser, a miniseries produced for GMA News and Public Affairs.

At the 9th Cinemalaya Film Festival, she received the Balanghai Trophy for Best Actress in the New Breed Category for her performance in Transit as Janet, an OFW working in Israel "struggling to keep her family together amid threats of cultural dislocation." She received a Special Jury Citation for Ensemble Acting which she shares with Ping Medina, Jasmine Curtis-Smith, Mercedes Cabral, Marc Justine Alvarez, and Yatzuck Azuz.

=== 2014–present: Continued appearances on screen and stage ===
In 2014, she starred in Ronnie Lazaro's directorial debut Edna, a film that again tackles the stories of OFWs. She played Edna dela Costa, a Filipino caregiver returning home to find a changed family. Adlawan was also part of The Janitor, an entry in the Directors Showcase category of Cinemalaya X. She joined the cast of Liza Soberano and Enrique Gil's launching teleserye Forevermore, as Mirasol, a farmer and maternal figure to Soberano's character, Agnes.

In 2015, she continued to appear in ABS-CBN and GMA's drama anthologies, as well as their seasonal television specials, and was cast in supporting roles in films including Sleepless, a QCinema Film Festival offering, and Walang Forever, an entry to the 41st Metro Manila Film Festival. She returned to the stage in October, in Tanghalang Pilipino's Mga Buhay na Apoy, Kanakan-Balintagos' Palanca-award-winning play. She was cast in Destiny Rose as Bethilda Vitto, one of the show's antagonists. She received a Best Supporting Actress nod for her performance as Mirasol in Forevermore at the 29th PMPC Star Awards for Television.

n 2015, Adlawan received the Gawad BUHAY! award for Outstanding Lead Female Performance in a Play for her performance as Soledad Santos in Mga Buhay na Apoy. She continued to appear in television shows and movies, and returned to the Virgin Lab Fest stage in Kanakan Balintagos' Loyalist. She replaced Nora Aunor in the Metro Manila Film Festival entry, Oro, for which she won Best Actress award.

== Reception ==
Adlawan is regarded as one of the most accomplished and respected theater actors in the Philippines. She has appeared in numerous Shakespearean adaptations and modern realist masterpieces of world theater. She was inducted into the Hall of Fame of Aliw Awards for her winning performances in 100 Songs of Mary Helen Fee (2001), Speaking in Tongues (2004), and Ang Pokpok ng Ohio (2005). Writing for TheaterFansManila.com, Nikki Francisco praised her performance in the staging of Makbet in 2017, describing her as an actress "on a league of her own."

Writing for the Philippine Entertainment Portal, Jocelyn Valle opined that Adlawan's performance in the drama film Edna (2014) was effective, and praised her ability to create her character with "believability, consistency, and sympathy".

== Personal life ==
Adlawan married actor/writer/director Dennis Marasigan, whom she met during their time at the UP and with whom she has four children. He has directed her in several of his films: Sa North Diversion Road, Tukso, and Vox Populi. They are separated.

== Acting credits ==
=== Theatre ===
| Year | Title | Role | Theatre company | Notes |
|---|---|---|---|---|
| 1983 | A Midsummer Night's Dream | Helena | Dulaang UP | |
| 1984 | Three Sisters | Irina | Dulaang UP | |
| 1985 | The Queen and the Rebels | Argia | Dulaang UP | |
| 1985 | Rashomon | Kinume | Dulaang UP | |
| 1987 | The Misanthrope | Célimène | Dulaang UP | |
| 1988 | The Merchant of Venice | Portia | Dulaang UP | |
| 1991 | Mac Malicsi, T.N.T. | Sally Sumulong | Tanghalang Pilipino | |
| 1991 | Sa North Diversion Road | Woman | Tanghalang Pilipino | Reprised role on film in 2005. |
| 1992 | Ang Buhay Ay Pelikula | Prodyuser | Tanghalang Pilipino | Young Critics Circle Award for Best Actress of the Year (1992); Reprised role in 1994. |
| 1992 | The Seagull | Nina | Tanghalang Pilipino | |
| 1992 | Sigalot sa Venetia | Checca | Tanghalang Pilipino | |
| 1992 | Aninag, Anino | | Tanghalang Pilipino | |
| 1992 | Anatomiya ng Korupsiyon | Cely | Tanghalang Pilipino | Reprised role in 1998 and 2002. |
| 1992 | Teodora | Teodora Alonso | Tanghalang Pilipino | |
| 1994 | Orosman at Zafira | Zafira | Tanghalang Pilipino | |
| 1994 | Ulilang Tahanan | Clemencia | Tanghalang Pilipino | Reprised role in 1996 and 1998. |
| 1994 | Kalantiaw | Multiple roles | Tanghalang Pilipino | Played Babaeng Guro, Asawa, Katutubong Babae 1–8. Reprised role in 1995. |
| 1995 | Noli Me Tangere: The Musical | Sisa | Tanghalang Pilipino | |
| 1995 | Hedda Gabler | Hedda Gabler | Tanghalang Pilipino | |
| 1997 | Lysistrata | Lysistrata | Tanghalang Pilipino | |
| 2002 | 100 Songs of Mary Helen Fee | Mary Helen | Tanghalang Pilipino | Aliw Award for Best Stage Actress |
| 2005 | Speaking in Tongues | Jane | Tanghalang Pilipino | Aliw Award for Best Stage Actress |
| 2006 | Ang Pokpok ng Ohio | Pokpok | Tanghalang Pilipino | Aliw Award for Best Stage Actress |
| 2006 | Bakeretta (Ghost Operetta) | Thea | | |
| 2008 | Othello: Ang Moro ng Venecia | Desdemona | Tanghalang Ateneo | |
| 2008 | The Golden Child | Siu Yong | Tanghalang Pilipino | Nominated – Gawad BUHAY! Award for Outstanding Female Lead Performance in a Play (2008) |
| 2009 | A Portrait of the Artist as Filipino | Candida Marasigan | Repertory Philippines | Reprised role four times, twice in 2013 and another two times in 2014. |
| 2010 | Medea | Medea | UP Dulaang Laboratoryo | |
| 2012 | Forsaken House | Encarna | Dulaang UP | |
| 2015 | Mga Buhay Na Apoy | Soledad Santos | Tanghalang Pilipino | Nominated – Gawad BUHAY! Award for Outstanding Female Lead Performance in a Play (2015) |
| 2017 | Makbet | Lady Macbeth | CSB-SDA | |

=== Films ===
| Year | Title | Role | Notes |
|---|---|---|---|
| 1995 | Bagong Bayani | Virginia Parumog | |
| 1996 | Bakit May Kahapon Pa? | Karina's mother | |
| 1997 | Minsan Lamang Magmahal | Miss Anuevas | |
| 1998 | José Rizal | Lucia | as Irma Adlawan-Marasigan |
| 2001 | Tuhog | Perla | |
| 2001 | La Vida Rosa | Dado's mother | as Irma Marasigan |
| 2002 | Mga Munting Tinig | Fe | |
| 2002 | Mano Po | Congresswoman | |
| 2003 | Homecoming | Puring | |
| 2004 | Bridal Shower | Joebert's mother | |
| 2004 | Milan | Mary Grace's aunt | |
| 2004 | Naglalayag | Charie | |
| 2004 | Santa Santita | Mother with cellphone | |
| 2005 | Nasaan Ka Man | Abling | |
| 2005 | ICU Bed #7 | Cely | |
| 2005 | Sa North Diversion Road | Woman | Nominated – Golden Screen Award for Best Performance by an Actress in a Leading Role, Drama (2006); Nominated – Gawad Urian Award for Best Actress (Pinakamahusay na Pangunahing Aktres) (2006) |
| 2005 | Mga Pusang Gala | Marta | Nominated – Star Award for Movies for Movie Actress of the Year (2006); Nominated – FAP Award for Best Actress (2006); Nominated – FAMAS Award for Best Actress (2006) |
| 2006 | Mano Po 5: Gua Ai Di | Mrs. Go | |
| 2007 | Tukso | Fe | |
| 2007 | Still Life | | |
| 2007 | Signos | Cora | |
| 2007 | Ataul: For Rent | Aling Carmen | FAMAS Award for Best Supporting Actress (2008); Nominated – Star Award for Movies for Movie Supporting Actress of the Year (2008); Nominated – Golden Screen Award for Best Performance by an Actress in a Supporting Role, Drama (2008); Nominated – FAP Award for Best Supporting Actress (2008) |
| 2007 | Bahay Kubo: A Pinoy Mano Po! | Julie | as Irma Adlawan-Marasigan |
| 2008 | Huling Pasada | | |
| 2008 | Parolado | Adela | Short film |
| 2008 | Hubad | Carmen Manahan | Nominated – Star Award for Movies for Movie Actress of the Year (2009) |
| 2008 | A Very Special Love | Baby Magtalas | |
| 2008 | Melancholia | Spiritist / Store owner | |
| 2008 | Dose | Helen | |
| 2009 | You Changed My Life | Baby Magtalas | |
| 2009 | Padyak | Pacita | |
| 2009 | Heavenly Touch | Lydia | |
| 2009 | Kamoteng Kahoy | Leticia | |
| 2009 | Mangatyanan | Luzviminda Marquez | |
| 2009 | Ang Panggagahasa Kay Fe | Fe | Nominated – Gawad Urian Award for Best Actress (Pinakamahusay na Pangunahing Aktres) (2010) |
| 2009 | Panahon Na | Teresa | |
| 2009 | Iliw | | |
| 2009 | Shake, Rattle & Roll XI | Dr. Yulo | |
| 2010 | Bigasan | Rebecca | |
| 2010 | Off World | The mother | |
| 2010 | Vox Populi | Connie de Gracia | |
| 2010 | Amigo | Josefa | |
| 2010 | Super Inday and the Golden Bibe | Lucita | |
| 2011 | Wedding Tayo, Wedding Hindi | Laura Baytion | |
| 2012 | Sta. Niña | | |
| 2012 | The Reunion | Irma (Pat's mother) | |
| 2013 | It Takes a Man and a Woman | Baby Magtalas | |
| 2013 | Transit | Janet | Cinemalaya IX Balanghai Trophy for Best Actress – New Breed Category (2013); Cinemalaya IX Special Jury Citation for Ensemble Acting – New Breed Category* (2013); Nominated – Golden Screen Award for Best Performance by an Actress in a Leading Role, Drama (2014) |
| 2013 | Bamboo Flowers | Berta | |
| 2013 | Islands | Daughter | |
| 2013 | Island Dreams | Maria | |
| 2014 | The Janitor | Crisanto's mother | |
| 2014 | Edna | Edna dela Costa | |
| 2014 | Bacao | | |
| 2014 | Beauty in a Bottle | Herself | Cameo appearance |
| 2014 | Konsensya | | Short film |
| 2015 | Dimalupig | | |
| 2015 | Isang Butil Na Kahapon | | |
| 2015 | Must Date The Playboy | Nora Alcantara | |
| 2015 | Sleepless | Carmela | |
| 2015 | Walang Forever | Tessie | |
| 2016 | Always Be My Maybe | Mila | |
| 2016 | Sakaling Hindi Makarating | Mama | Special participation |
| 2016 | Imagine You and Me | Terry | |
| 2016 | The Unmarried Wife | Anne's mom | |
| 2016 | Oro | Kapitana | Best Actress, Metro Manila Film Festival (2016) |
| 2017 | I'm Drunk, I Love You | Carson's mother | |
| 2020 | Four Sisters Before the Wedding | Lola Ibiang | |
| 2024 | 40 | | |
| 2025 | Sampung Utos Kay Josh | Josh's Mother | |
| 2025 | Child No. 82: Anak ni Boy Kana | Mother Betty | |

*: shared with Ping Medina, Jasmine Curtis-Smith, Mercedes Cabral, and Marc Justine Alvarez.

=== Television / Digital ===
| Year | Title | Role | Notes | Source |
|---|---|---|---|---|
| 1978–1990 | Student Canteen | Co-Host | | |
| 1991–1996 | That's Entertainment | Co-Host / Herself | Friday Group Member | |
| 1999–2001 | Click | Melai's mother | | |
| 2001–2003 | Sa Dulo ng Walang Hanggan | Mercy | | |
| 2002–2003 | Kay Tagal Kang Hinintay | Sondra | | |
| 2004 | Te Amo, Maging Sino Ka Man | Olivia | Supporting role | |
| 2005–2006 | Mga Anghel na Walang Langit | Menggay | | |
| 2005 | Encantadia | Amanda | | |
| 2006 | Now and Forever: Tinig | Noemi | | |
| 2006 | Komiks | | Episode: "Kamay Ni Hilda" | |
| 2006 | Maalaala Mo Kaya | Albert's mother | Episode: "Lampara" | |
| 2006–2007 | Maging Sino Ka Man | Imelda Magsaysay | | |
| 2007 | Marimar | Silva | | |
| 2007 | Maalaala Mo Kaya | | Episode: "Tako" | |
| 2007 | Maalaala Mo Kaya | Teresa | Episode: "Korona" | |
| 2008 | Lobo | Clara Rivero | | |
| 2008 | Maalaala Mo Kaya | Ricardo's mother | Episode: "Leather Shoes" | |
| 2009 | Parekoy | Ema | | |
| 2009 | Tayong Dalawa | Berta Romano | Cameo | |
| 2009 | Sine Novela: Paano Ba Ang Mangarap? | Ising Estrella | | |
| 2009 | Only You | Corazon "Cora" Mendoza | | |
| 2009 | The Wedding | Grace Mañalac | | |
| 2009–2010 | Nagsimula sa Puso | Liza Bernardo | | |
| 2009 | Maalaala Mo Kaya | Charo | Episode: "Sulo" | |
| 2010 | Maalaala Mo Kaya | Cristina | Episode: "Gitara" | |
| 2010 | Magkaribal | Carolina | | |
| 2010 | Maalaala Mo Kaya | Meya | Episode: "Titulo" | |
| 2010–2011 | Precious Hearts Romances Presents: Kristine | Margarita Fortalejo-Cervantes | | |
| 2010–2011 | Precious Hearts Romances Presents: My Cheating Heart | Zeny Santa Romana | | |
| 2011 | Your Song: Kim | Mrs. Menendrez | Episode: "For You" | |
| 2011 | Maalaala Mo Kaya | Mama Bob | Episode: "Piyesa" | |
| 2011 | Maalaala Mo Kaya | Paolo's mother | Episode: "Jacket" | |
| 2011–2012 | Amaya | Bai Mantal | | |
| 2012 | Alice Bungisngis and her Wonder Walis | Margarita "Maggie" Fernandez / Gareng Lucsin | | |
| 2012 | Wansapanataym | Loida | Episode: "Lai, Lai, Batang Pasaway!" | |
| 2012 | Maalaala Mo Kaya | Lita | Episode: "Jacket" | |
| 2012 | Angelito: Ang Bagong Yugto | Sally | | |
| 2012–2013 | Sana ay Ikaw na Nga | Libay | | |
| 2012–2013 | Magdalena: Anghel sa Putikan | Ludivina "Luding" Fuentebella | | |
| 2013 | Maalaala Mo Kaya | Gugoy | Episode: "Bahay" | |
| 2013 | Maalaala Mo Kaya | Paning | Episode: "Make-Up" | |
| 2013–2014 | Got to Believe | Yaya Puring | | |
| 2013 | Be Careful With My Heart | Victoria "Vicky" Reyes | | |
| 2013 | Maalaala Mo Kaya | Minda | Episode: "Dream House" | |
| 2013 | Titser | Principal May Deroca | | |
| 2013 | Genesis | Felicita "Fely" Hernandez | | |
| 2013–2015 | Magpakailanman | Various roles | | |
| 2014 | Rhodora X | Dra. Vivian Bautista | | |
| 2014 | My BFF | Tonying | | |
| 2014 | Maalaala Mo Kaya | Nati | Episode: "Mikropono" | |
| 2014 | Maalaala Mo Kaya | Lita | Episode: "Baston" | |
| 2014 | Ipaglaban Mo! | Tiyang | Episode: "Buong Tapang Na Lalaban" | |
| 2014–2015 | Forevermore | Mirasol Amparo | | |
| 2015 | Eat Bulaga!: Lenten Special | Alma | | |
| 2015 | It's Showtime: Holy Week Special | Dolores | | |
| 2015 | Ipaglaban Mo! | Boyet's mother | Episode: "Tanging Saksi" | |
| 2015 | Maalaala Mo Kaya | Lilia | Episode: "Sapatos" | |
| 2015 | Nathaniel | Mrs. Masinayon | | |
| 2015 | Maalaala Mo Kaya | Zyra's mother | Episode: "Bottled Water" | |
| 2015 | Doble Kara | Esmeralda "Esme" Hipolito† | | |
| 2015 | Walang Iwanan | Lydia Trinidad-Gonzales | | |
| 2015–2016 | Destiny Rose | Bethilda Vitto-Jacobs | | |
| 2016 | Ipaglaban Mo! | Cristina's mother | Episode: "Huwad" | |
| 2016 | Once Again | Cecilia Del Mundo | | |
| 2016–2017 | Sa Piling ni Nanay | Atty. Remedios "Remy" Sandel | | |
| 2016 | Ipaglaban Mo! | Libay's mother | Episode: "OFW" | |
| 2016–2017 | Trops | Sheena "Momskie" Tolentino | | |
| 2017 | A Love to Last | Virginia "Baby" Custodio-Agoncillo | | |
| 2017 | FPJ's Ang Probinsyano | Dulce Moreno | | |
| 2018 | Tadhana | Lucille | Episode: "Karayom" | |
| 2018 | Since I Found You | Tyang | | |
| 2018 | The Cure | Agnes Salvador | | |
| 2018 | Sana Dalawa ang Puso | Sandra Tan | | |
| 2018 | Halik | Myrna Toledo | | |
| 2019 | Maalaala Mo Kaya | Dudz's mother | Episode: "Pregnancy Test" | |
| 2019 | Tadhana | Georgette | Episode: "Patibong" | |
| 2019 | Magpakailanman | Nanay Rosalinda | Episode: "Mula Zamboanga Hanggang Sementeryo (The Ethel Nierras Story)" | |
| 2019 | Maalaala Mo Kaya | Nena Ruiz | Episode: "Passport" | |
| 2019 | Tadhana | Ester | Episode: "Yaya CEO" | |
| 2019–2020 | Pamilya Ko | Loida Magtulis | | |
| 2020 | A Soldier's Heart | Yasmin Alhuraji / Amara | | |
| 2021 | Maalaala Mo Kaya | Conching | Episode: "Bigas" | |
| 2021 | Maalaala Mo Kaya | Conching | Episode: "Titulo" | |
| 2021 | Legal Wives | Nuriya Baunto | | |
| 2022 | Tadhana | Norma | Episode: "Sikreto" | |
| 2022 | 2 Good 2 Be True | Heart | | |
| 2022 | Magpakailanman | Loida San Juan | Episode: "Ang Driver na Mr. Pogi (The Carlo San Juan Story)" | |
| 2023—2025 | FPJ's Batang Quiapo | Olga Zialcita-Montenegro | | |
| 2025 | Bad Genius | Nenita | | |
| 2025–2026 | The Alibi | Rebecca Morales | | |
| 2026 | Love Is Never Gone | Nadia | | |
| 2026 | Sigabo | Betchay Cabagsik | | |

=== Microdrama ===
| Year | Title | Role | Notes | Source |
|---|---|---|---|---|
| 2026 | How to Murder a Doña | Carmen | | |

== Accolades ==
Awards and nominations received by Irma Adlawan
| Award | Year (Note: Indicates the year of ceremony. Each year is linked to the article about the awards held that year, wherever possible.) | Work | Category | Result | Ref(s) |
|---|---|---|---|---|---|
| Aliw Awards | 2001 | Irma Adlawan | Best Stage Actress | Nominated | |
| Aliw Awards | 2002 | 100 Songs of Mary Helen Fee | Best Stage Actress | Won | |
| Aliw Awards | 2005 | Speaking in Tongues | Best Stage Actress | Won | |
| Aliw Awards | 2006 | Ang Pokpok ng Ohio | Best Stage Actress | Won | |
| Aliw Awards | 2008 | Irma Adlawan | Inducted into Hall of Fame | Won | |
| Cinemalaya Independent Film Festival | 2013 | Transit | Best Actress | Won | |
| Cinemalaya Independent Film Festival | 2013 | Transit | Special Citation for Ensemble Performance | Won | |
| FAMAS Awards | 2006 | Mga Pusang Gala | Best Actress | Nominated | |
| FAMAS Awards | 2008 | Ataul for Hire | Best Supporting Actress | Won | |
| FAMAS Awards | 2018 | What Home Feels Like | Best Supporting Actress | Nominated | |
| Gawad Buhay | 2009 | Golden Child | Outstanding Female Lead Performance in a Play | Nominated | |
| Gawad Buhay | 2016 | Mga Buhay na Apoy | Outstanding Female Lead Performance in a Play | Won | |
| Gawad Pasado | 2006 | Mga Pusong Gala | Best Actress | Nominated | |
| Gawad Pasado | 2008 | A Very Special Love | Best Supporting Actress | Nominated | |
| Gawad Tanglaw | 2008 | Ataul for Rent | Best Actress | Nominated | |
| Gawad Tanglaw | 2020 | Maalaala Mo Kaya (Episode: "Passport") | Best Actress in a Single Performance | Won | |
| Gawad Urian | 2001 | Tuhog | Best Actress | Nominated | |
| Gawad Urian | 2002 | Mga Munting Tinig | Best Supporting Actress | Nominated | |
| Gawad Urian | 2006 | Sa North Diversion Road | Best Actress | Nominated | |
| Gawad Urian | 2010 | Ang Panggagahasa kay Fe | Best Actress | Nominated | |
| Gawad Urian | 2017 | Oro | Best Actress | Nominated | |
| Golden Screen Awards | 2006 | Sa North Diversion Road | Best Performance by an Actress in a Leading Role (Drama) | Nominated | |
| Golden Screen Awards | 2008 | Ataul for Hire | Best Performance by an Actress in a Supporting Role (Drama, Musical or Comedy) | Nominated | |
| Golden Screen Awards | 2014 | Transit | Best Performance by an Actress in a Leading Role (Drama) | Nominated | |
| Luna Awards | 2006 | Mga Pusang Gala | Best Actress | Nominated | |
| Luna Awards | 2006 | Nasaan Ka Man | Best Supporting Actress | Nominated | |
| Luna Awards | 2008 | Ataul for Hire | Best Supporting Actress | Nominated | |
| Manila Film Festival | 2004 | Naglalayag | Best Supporting Actress | Nominated | |
| Metro Manila Film Festival | 2003 | Homecoming | Best Supporting Actress | Nominated | |
| Metro Manila Film Festival | 2016 | Oro | Best Actress | Won | |
| To Farm Film Festival | 2017 | What Home Feels Like | Best Actress | Won | |
| Toyama International Theater Festival | 1992 | Ang Buhay Ay Pelikula | Best Stage Actress | Won | |
| Star Awards for Movies | 2002 | Tuhog | Best Supporting Actress | Nominated | |
| Star Awards for Movies | 2006 | Mga Pusang Gala | Movie Actress of the Year | Nominated | |
| Star Awards for Movies | 2008 | Ataul for Hire | Movie Supporting Actress of the Year | Nominated | |
| Star Awards for Movies | 2009 | Hubad | Movie Actress of the Year | Nominated | |
| Star Awards for Television | 2014 | Maalaala Mo Kaya (Episode: "Mikropono") | Best Single Performance by an Actress | Nominated | |
| Star Awards for Television | 2015 | Forevermore | Best Drama Supporting Actress | Nominated | |
| Star Awards for Television | 2019 | Maalaala Mo Kaya ("Episode: "Passport") | Best Single Performance by an Actress | Nominated | |
| Star Awards for Television | 2021 | Pamilya Ko | Best Drama Supporting Actress | Nominated | |
| Young Critics Circle | 1992 | Ang Buhay Ay Pelikula | Best Stage Actress | Won | |
