= Experimental Cinema of the Philippines =

Philippine government-owned corporation

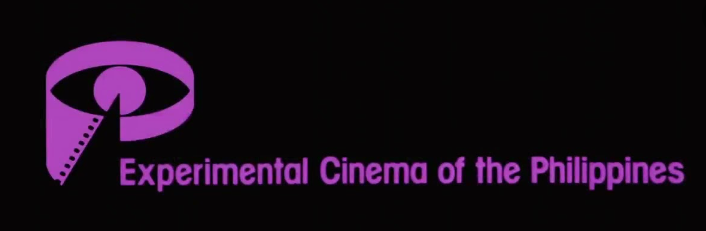
- Type: Government-owned corporation
- Industry: Film production
- Founded: January 29, 1982
- Defunct: October 2, 1985
- Fate: Dissolved by the Corazon Aquino administration; The first four films are now owned by ABS-CBN Corporation since 2001
- Successor: Film Development Council of the Philippines; ABS-CBN Film Productions (film library)
- Headquarters: Manila, Philippines
- Key people: Imee Marcos (Director General); Charo Santos-Concio (Producer)
- Products: Motion pictures
- Owner: Government of the Philippines

The Experimental Cinema of the Philippines (ECP) was a government-owned corporation of the Republic of the Philippines created to promote the growth and development of the local film industry. Created in 1982 after the first Manila International Film Festival through Executive Order 770, the ECP was primarily known as a production company. However, it was created among other things; to hold the Manila International Film Festival, to manage the Manila Film Center, administer a film rating and classification system and to establish and operate the National Film Archive. It was also mandated to provide financial assistance to select motion pictures through a film fund.

For purposes of policy coordination, it was placed under the Ministry of Tourism. While its initial films were critically acclaimed, the ECP was accused of producing sex-oriented or "Bomba" films later in its history until it was dissolved in 1986.

From the official documents, the Experimental Cinema of the Philippines formally ceased its operations through Executive Order No. 1051.

== Filmography ==
Title	Director	Writer	Date	Main cast	Genre
Oro, Plata, Mata	Peque Gallaga	José Javier Reyes	January 27, 1982	Cherie Gil, Sandy Andolong, Joel Torre, Liza Lorena, Fides Cuyugan-Asencio, Manny Ojeda, Maya Valdez, Lorli Villanueva, Ronnie Lazaro	Historical Drama
Himala	Ishmael Bernal	Ricky Lee	December 25, 1982	Nora Aunor	Drama
Soltero	Pio De Castro III	Boy Noriega	April 21, 1984	Jay Ilagan, Rio Locsin, Chanda Romero	Drama
Misteryo sa Tuwa	Abbo Q. Dela Cruz		December 25, 1984	Tony Santos Sr., Johnny Delgado, Ronnie Lazaro, Alicia Alonzo, Lito Anzures, Amable Quiambao, Mara Montes	Drama, Thriller
Manila by Night (Note: Re-release) (Note: As distributor only)	Ishmael Bernal	Ishmael Bernal, Ricky Lee	January 16, 1985	Charito Solis, Alma Moreno, Lorna Tolentino, Rio Locsin, Cherie Gil, Gina Alajar, Orestes Ojeda, William Martinez, Bernardo Bernardo	Drama
Isla (Note: Co-produced with Viva Films)	Celso Ad. Castillo	Celso Ad. Castillo, José Javier Reyes (Screenplay)	April 25, 1985	Maria Isabel Lopez, Joseph de Cordova, Gil de Leon	Drama

== See also ==
- Cultural Center of the Philippines
- Movie and Television Review and Classification Board
- Cinema Evaluation Board of the Philippines
- Manila Film Center
