= Quiambao =

Quiambao is a surname. Notable people with the surname include:

- Ama Quiambao (1947–2013), Filipina actress
- Kevin Quiambao (born 2001), Filipino basketball player
- Miriam Quiambao (born 1975), Filipina actress, television host, and pageant titleholder
- Niña Jose-Quiambao (born 1988), Filipina actress and politician
