= Rody Lacap =

Filipino cinematographer

- Born: Rodolfo Austria Lacap; January 29, 1950 (age 76); Quezon City, Philippines
- Education: Arellano University (dropped out)
- Occupations: Cinematographer; Photographer
- Years active: 1973–present
- Notable work: Itim, Oro, Plata, Mata

Rodolfo "Rody" Austria Lacap (born January 29, 1950) is a Filipino cinematographer. He started as a projectionist before becoming a photographer and cinematographer. His work in films such as Itim (1976) and Oro, Plata, Mata (1982) earned him awards for best cinematography.

== Early life ==
Lacap was born on January 29, 1950, in Quezon City, Metro Manila, and is the fourth of six children of Raymundo Lacap, a cinematographer for LVN Pictures from 1948 until he died in 1954, and Generosa Austria. Aside from his father, his two maternal uncles, Ding and Peping Austria, also worked as a cinematographer for the film studio.

He finished elementary at the Ponciano Bernardo Elementary School and high school at the Cubao High School. He studied for two years at the Arellano University before he dropped out.

== Career ==
At the insistence of his older brother Carlos, Lacap began his career in 1973 at LVN as a projectionist, color grader, and optical printer operator and later, at Cinema Artists as a title designer and special visual effects technician. In 1975, Mike de Leon, grandson of LVN foundress Narcisa de León and then-manager of the film studio, trained him to become a photographer and cinematographer.

In 1976, he worked for de Leon's directorial debut, Itim, as a gaffer and lighting director. As a result of his work, he and fellow cinematographer Ely Cruz, who worked as a director of photography and camera operator in the film, won the best cinematography award from Gawad Urian and FAMAS awards. In 1980, he and his mentor Mike de Leon were tapped as the cinematographers of the film Aguila, directed by Eddie Romero. However, when de Leon left the project, Romero agreed to his recommendation to be replaced by Lacap for the role of cinematographer in the film. His cinematography work in Aguila earned him a nomination at the Gawad Urian in 1981 but lost to Conrado Baltazar.

In 1982, Lacap was tapped by Peque Gallaga to be the cinematographer of his first full-length film, Oro, Plata, Mata. He photographed the film's integral parts including the opening party, the exodus with the burning field in the background, and the bloodlust finale at the ruined hospital. His photography work for the World War II-set film earned him his third "best cinematography" win at the Gawad Urian in 1983. Thirty years later, he and Gallaga consulted for its restoration where, according to the director, the former checked the color grading.

He is also involved as a consultant in the restorations of the films where he served as cinematographer, primarily Oro, Plata, Mata, Misteryo sa Tuwa, and Itim. In restoring Misteryo sa Tuwa in 2019, he was contacted by ABS-CBN's film restoration team for the approval of fixing the damaged frames and later, advised the team to use sepia tones for the damaged frames rather than colorization.

== Credits ==
=== As a cinematographer ===
- Itim (1976)
- Iwahig (1977)
- Kakabakaba Ka Ba? (1980)
- Aguila (1980)
- Kung Ako'y Iiwan Mo (1980)
- Playgirl (1981)
- Kisapmata (1981)
- Oro, Plata, Mata (1982)
- Batch '81 (1982)
- Hotshots (1984)
- Mga Batang Yagit (1984)
- Misteryo sa Tuwa (1984)
- Sister Stella L. (1984)
- Beloved (1985)
- Hinugot sa Langit (1985)
- Muling Buksan ang Puso (1985)
- I Love You Mama, I Love You Papa (1986)
- Nakagapos na Puso (1986)
- Jack and Jill (1987)
- Maging Akin Ka Lamang (1987)
- Pasan Ko ang Daigdig (1987)
- Babaeng Hampaslupa (1988)
- Smith & Wesson (1988)
- Kumander Bawang: Kalaban ng Mga Aswang (1988)
- Barbi: Maid in the Philippines (1989)
- Kailan Mahuhugasan ang Kasalanan? (1989)
- Orapronobis (1989)
- Starzan: Shouting Star of the Jungle (1989)
- Jose Rizal (1998)
- Muro-Ami (1999)
- Paglipad ng Anghel (2011)
- Felix Manalo (2015)
- Miss Granny (2018)
- Magikland (2020)

=== As an opticals technician ===
- Manila in the Claws of Light (1975)
- Itim (1976)
- Kung Mangarap Ka't Magising (1977)
- Kisapmata (1981)
- Ang Panday: Ikatlong Yugto (1982)
- Tagos ng Dugo (1987)

=== As a camera and electrical operator ===
- Hindi Nahahati ang Langit (1985)
- Bilanggo sa Dilim (1986)

== Awards and nominations ==
Year	Award	Category	Title	Result	Ref.
1977	Gawad Urian Awards	Best Cinematography	Itim	Won	
1977	FAMAS Awards	Best Cinematography	Itim	Won	
1980	6th Metro Manila Film Festival	Best Cinematography	Kung Ako'y Iiwan Mo	Won	
1981	Gawad Urian Awards	Best Cinematography	Aguila	Nominated	
1981	Gawad Urian Awards	Best Cinematography	Kakabakaba Ka Ba?	Nominated	
1982	Gawad Urian Awards	Best Cinematography	Kisapmata	Won	
1982	Gawad Urian Awards	Best Cinematography	Playgirl	Nominated	
1983	Gawad Urian Awards	Best Cinematography	Batch '81	Nominated	
1983	Gawad Urian Awards	Best Cinematography	Oro, Plata, Mata	Won	
1985	Gawad Urian Awards	Best Cinematography	Misteryo sa Tuwa	Won	
1985	Gawad Urian Awards	Best Cinematography	Sister Stella L.	Nominated	
1986	Gawad Urian Awards	Best Cinematography	Hinugot sa Langit	Nominated	
1987	Gawad Urian Awards	Best Cinematography	Halimaw (segment: "Komiks")	Nominated	
1989	Gawad Urian Awards	Best Cinematography	Babaeng Hampaslupa	Nominated	
1998	24th Metro Manila Film Festival	Best Cinematography	Jose Rizal	Won	
1999	Gawad Urian Awards	Best Cinematography	Jose Rizal	Won	
1999	FAMAS Awards	Best Cinematography	Jose Rizal	Won	
1999	25th Metro Manila Film Festival	Best Cinematography	Muro-Ami	Won	
2021	4th Entertainment Editors' Choice Awards for Movies	Best Cinematography	Magikland	Won	
