= Soltero (1984 film) =

1984 drama film by Pio de Castro III

- Directed by: Pio de Castro III
- Screenplay by: Bienvenido Noriega Jr.
- Produced by: Bienvenido Noriega Jr. (Note: Executive producer); Ward Luarca (Note: Associate producer); Ching T. Dacuycuy; Bibsy M. Carballo (Note: Line producer)
- Starring: Jay Ilagan; Rio Locsin; Chanda Romero
- Cinematography: Clodualdo "Ding" Austria
- Edited by: Edgardo Jarlego
- Music by: Sonny Angeles; Ed Gatchalian
- Production company: Experimental Cinema of the Philippines
- Release dates: April 21, 1984 (Philippines); June 12, 1985 (Japan; Asia-Pacific Film Festival)
- Running time: 130 minutes
- Country: Philippines
- Language: Filipino

Soltero is a 1984 Filipino drama film directed by Pio de Castro III from a screenplay written by Bienvenido Noriega Jr.. The film stars Jay Ilagan, Rio Locsin, and Chanda Romero and it tells the life of a soltero (young bachelor) living alone in his condominium apartment, working as an assistant manager at a bank, and how he manages his life with his family he loved and the past romances he had.

Produced and distributed by Experimental Cinema of the Philippines, the film was theatrically released on April 21, 1984. In 2020, the film was digitally restored and remastered by ABS-CBN Film Restoration, with the involvement of L'Immagine Ritrovata, Kantana Post-Production, and Wildsound Studios.

== Summary ==
“Para sa lahat ng mga nagsisikap lumigaya, bagaman nag-iisa. At sa mga may katambal na, ngunit nagsasarili pa rin.”

“For those who seek happiness despite being alone. And for those who may have found it, but still wish to be alone.”

— Bienvenido Noriega Jr.

Crispin Rodriguez, the soltero (bachelor) of the story, is a 29-year-old young man who lives in a condominium apartment all by himself and works as an assistant manager of the Traders Royal Bank in Manila. Most of the time, he spends his time hanging out with his office friends like going to parties at bars, eating at a restaurant, or watching movies at the Manila Film Center. However, since he is nearing 30 and still lonely, the one thing he needs to complete his life is no other than a woman to love and become together.

== Cast ==
- Jay Ilagan as Crispin Rodriguez
- Rio Locsin as Christina
- Chanda Romero as RJ Juan
- Baby Delgado as Nene
- Dick Israel as Teddy
- Bing Davao as Edwin
- Cris Vertido as Joey
- Alvin Enriquez as Bimbo
- Irma Potenciano as Crispin's mother
- Terrie Legarda as Bong
- Luigi Sison
- Manuel Conde as Crispin's grandfather
- Robert Campos
- Carmen Enriquez
- Mona Lisa as the old lady at the condominium
- Chito Ponce Enrile
- Menggie Cobarrubias
- Connie Angeles
- Khryss Adalia
- Nanding Josef
- Jack Azarcon
- Naty Santiago
- Pong Pong
- Bodjie Pascua as Theater Actor
- Louie Pascasio as Theater Actor

== Production ==
Throughout the whole life of Pio de Castro III as an actor, writer, and film critic, Soltero is the first of two films that he directed — the other film is Ina, Kasusuklaman Ba Kita?, which was released in 1985 and produced and distributed by Seiko Films. In an interview from TV Times, the film was shot within three months.

== Digital restoration ==
The film was restored by the ABS-CBN Film Restoration Project, with the help of L’Immagine Ritrovata in Italy, Kantana Post-Production in Thailand, and Wildsound Studios in Quezon City. The restoration process of Soltero started in 2016 with a 4K digital scan at Ritrovata's main laboratory in Bologna, Italy and the film prints used in the scanning were in bad condition, which was caused by many obstacles including color decay, missing frames, and vinegar syndrome that affected the whole print. Just like the other films from the ECP, the film negatives were lost or destroyed and the restoration team decided to restore the films of the said company through positive prints. All of the existing prints of the Experimental Cinema of the Philippines library are stored and archived in the ABS-CBN Film Archives vault, located within the ELJ Communications Center in Quezon City.

However, the film's restoration process began to be rushed as the 70 lawmakers rejected ABS-CBN's hopes of having their broadcast franchise renewed and the team needed to complete it before its deadline on August 31.

On January 28, 2021, the restored version of the film was premiered digitally through KTX.ph, added with a pre-show hosted by ABS-CBN Film Archives head, Leo P. Katigbak and the leading actresses Rio Locsin and Chanda Romero were present at the said pre-show.

== Reception ==
=== Critical reception ===
Jim Paranal of Film Police Reviews described Soltero as a "quiet movie" and despite its colorful depictions of the 1980s, the melancholy of the lead character Crispin can be felt by everyone and his traits cannot be drifted further from the generation of millennials and Gen Z. He praised the film's direction under Pio de Castro III, the written screenplay by Bienvenido Noriega Jr., and the performances of the cast, particularly the lead actor Jay Ilagan. The film also discusses the issues of depression, attempted suicide among males, and representation of lesbian women where Chanda Romero's character RJ accurately portrays the role.

Noel Vera, writing under his column Critic After Dark for BusinessWorld, praised the acting performance of Jay Ilagan and describes the film Soltero as an "unlikely but ultimately necessary treatment on loneliness in Philippine society".

=== Accolades ===
Year	Award-giving body	Category	Recipient	Result
1985	Gawad Urian Awards	Best Director	Pio de Castro III	Nominated
1985	Gawad Urian Awards	Best Actor	Jay Ilagan	Nominated
1985	Gawad Urian Awards	Best Production Design	Cesar Jose	Nominated
1985	Gawad Urian Awards	Best Cinematography	Clodualdo "Ding" Austria	Nominated
1985	Gawad Urian Awards	Best Sound	Ramon Reyes and Sebastian Sayson	Nominated
