= Tanghalang Ateneo =

Arts center in Metro Manila, Philippines

Tanghalang Ateneo is the longest-running theater company of the Loyola Schools, Ateneo de Manila University. The company weaves into its work the theatrical traditions of the university's sesquicentennial past.

Tanghalang Ateneo uses theater to foster eloquentia, sapientia, and humanitas – the pillars of Jesuit pedagogy. It sees itself as a theater company in the service of student formation, and by extension – given the Jesuit ideal of magis – a theater in service of the nation.

== Notable players and awards ==
Since its founding in 1972 (and formally recognized five years later), Tanghalang Ateneo has grown from a fledgling band of student players to one of the country's leading school-based theater companies. Its repertoire of plays is daunting: from world classics to modern Filipino pieces. The languages used on stage are Filipino and English. The company prides itself in its students, who are skilled in producing and designing technical theater on a professional level.

Its members come from diverse academic fields. In fact, many have pursued careers in theater, television, and film; many more use their theater experience to excel in management, law, teaching, media, and cultural work.

Professional actors, designers, and choreographers have worked with the company. Notable alumni include actor Nonie Buencamino, who joined as a college student,[1] and former Manila City Council member Alfred Vargas, who began his acting career with the company while studying at Ateneo.[2]

Other notable actors Naty Crame-Rogers, Irma Adlawan, Teroy Guzman, Bodjie Pascua, Frances Makil-Ignacio, Floy Quintos, Myra Beltran, Leeroy New, and Gino Gonzales have worked with the company in previous seasons.

Tanghalang Ateneo has won two Aliw Awards for Best Production and another two for Best Direction for its 2008 and 2011 productions of Glenn Sevilla Mas's "The Death of Memory" (Direction: Ricardo G. Abad) and "Sintang Dalisay" (Direction: Ricardo G. Abad). Last year, the company received several citations, including two for the year's 10 Best Productions, in the Philippine Daily Inquirer's Best of Theater 2014 for its productions of Han Ong's "Middle Finger" (Direction: Ed Lacson, Jr.) and Glenn Sevilla Mas's "Rite of Passage: Sa Pagtubu kang Tahud" (Direction: Ron Capinding).

The company has also received production grants from the Cultural Center of the Philippines, the Loyola Schools, the National Commission for Culture and the Arts, the Spanish Program for Cultural Cooperation, and the Japan Foundation.

Its shows have also been shown in campuses and venues across the country and abroad, notably in Shanghai and Taiwan as part of the Festival of the Asian Pacific Bureau of Theatre Schools, and in Minsk, Belarus for the International University Theatre Association Student Theatre Festival. The company's past achievements have also facilitated the creation, in SY 2000–2001, of a degree program in Theater Arts within the Fine Arts Program of the Ateneo de Manila University.

== Artistic directors ==
Ricardo Saludo became the first artistic director and Moderator when Tanghalang Ateneo gained university recognition in 1979. Ricardo G. Abad (Ricky Abad) succeeded him and became the company's longest-serving Artistic Director and Moderator (1984-2013). In 2014, Glenn Sevilla Mas became the company's new artistic director and Moderator. In 2017, Guelan Luarca succeeded Mas as Artistic Director. Jenny Jamora became the company's Artistic Director in 2025, Tanghalang Ateneo's first female Artistic Director.

== History ==
Tanghalang Ateneo started out in 1974 as a group of friends who wished to stage plays, and having no theater to speak of on the Loyola Heights campus, scheduled performances at the college cafeteria. The group pressed the administration for a more suitable venue, and by 1978, a large classroom, seating about 80 people, was converted to the Gonzaga Fine Arts Theater.

Tanghalang Ateneo has staged productions in various theater venues within the Loyola Schools such as the Rizal Mini-Theater, which has a 250-seat capacity. Other productions have been staged at the Fine Arts Blackbox Theater, the Doreen Fernandez Blackbox Theater, and Arete Hyundai Hall.

The officers got recognized as an organization of the college, and recruited Ricardo Saludo, a faculty member of the Departments of English and of Communications, to serve as moderator. In 1979, under Saludo, Tanghalang Ateneo's first repertory season began. The repertory season of Filipino plays, original or in translation continued even after Saludo left to join Asiaweek magazine in Hong Kong in 1984.

He was succeeded by Ricardo G. Abad in 1984, who retained the repertory program but added English plays as part of its annual fare. In 2014, Glenn Sevilla Mas came aboard and became the company's new artistic director and Moderator.

Tanghalang Ateneo productions have also been seen off campus: over the last decade, the company has performed in the Cultural Center of the Philippines, the Metropolitan Theater, the Puerto Real Gardens, the Ninoy Aquino Park, the British Council, the Alliance Francaise, Vigan, Iloilo, Nueva Ecija, and a lot more.

== Recent seasons (2019-present) ==
In 2019, Tanghalang Ateneo presented Antigone, the Greek play, adapted to the Philippines. They also produced Batch 81, a drama set in a fraternity.

There was a break in presentations due to the COVID-19 pandemic in the Philippines.

Tanghalang Ateneo’s 2024 season was played in honor of the late director, Ricky Abad.

In July 2024, the company produced its adaptation of Shakespeare, Sintang Dalisay, based on Romeo and Juliet. It was reviewed glowingly by Tatler Asia. It had been produced first in 2011 by their late director, Ricky Abad.

In November 2024, their Filipino language production of Medea, starring alumni of the company, was favorably received by the television network ABS-CBN.

The University’s newspaper praised the Tanghalang Ateneo for producing plays in the Filipino language, while there has been a "devaluation of Filipino in the academe…."
