= ABS-CBN Film Restoration Project =

Philippine digital cinematography project

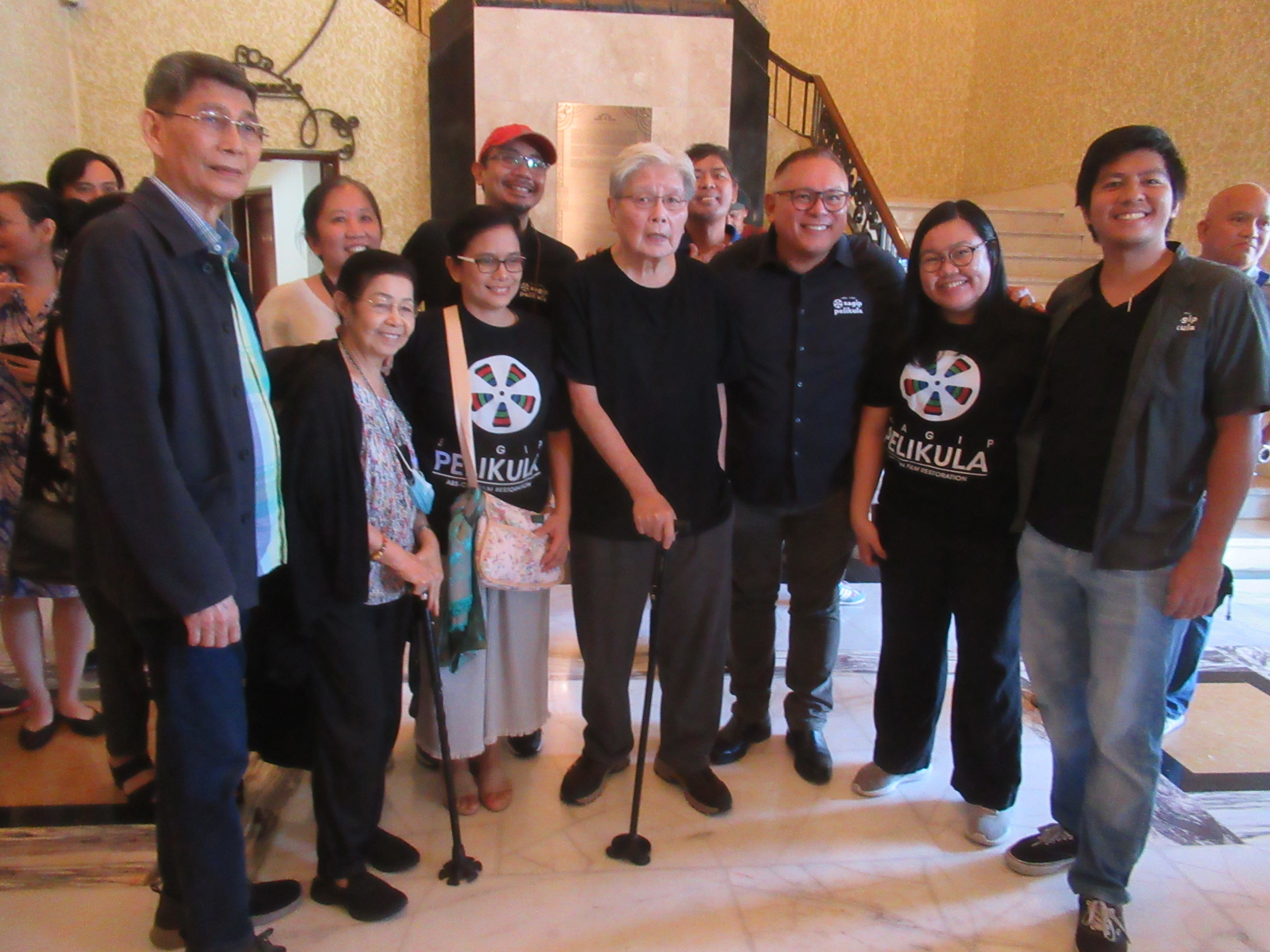
- Established: 2011; 15 years ago
- Chair: Leo Katigbak
- Address: ELJ Communications Center, Eugenio Lopez Drive, Diliman, Quezon City
- Location: Philippines
- Dissolved: March 31, 2025

ABS-CBN Film Restoration Project, also known as Sagip Pelikula, was a digital film restoration project of ABS-CBN Corporation in partnership with Central Digital Lab. Launched in 2011, the project was headed by Leo Katigbak of ABS-CBN Film Archives and Manet Dayrit of Central Digital Lab. The goal of the project was to digitally restore and remaster select Filipino films from the archives of ABS-CBN.

The project digitized, restored, and remastered over 240 Philippine films into a 1080p or 2K Digital Cinema Package format with a maximum resolution of 2048x1080 pixels at 24 frames per second. These films have been released through a wide array of platforms including limited theatrical runs, film festivals, free-to-air and cable television, DVDs, pay per view, and over-the-top content platforms such as iTunes. Most of the restoration processes were done by Central Digital Lab in the Philippines with the exception of select films which were commissioned by ABS-CBN to be restored abroad by L’Immagine Ritrovata in Bologna, Italy and Kantana Post-Production in Bangkok, Thailand, and others which were scanned and enhanced in-house. All copyrights to the films restored and remastered are owned in perpetuity by ABS-CBN.

On August 31, 2020, the film restoration project unit downsized its operations as part of the retrenchment by the company after its new legislative franchise for the company's broadcasting operations was denied by the House of Representatives.

On March 31, 2025, the project ceased its operations, citing effects attributed to the 2020 shutdown. It was later confirmed by head Leo Katigbak on his Facebook page on May 1.

== Restoration process ==
The first stage of the process is the scanning of the film negatives or prints into a digital picture and sound raw format. Depending on the film's condition, it may undergo a physical cleaning before the scanning could begin. The scanned materials will then undergo an automated and a painstaking frame by frame digital restoration process. The process involves the digital removal of dirt, scratches, fingerprints, discolorations, molds, tape marks, and other damages in the scanned materials. The process also involves the correction of color, brightness, and contrast into its original form often consulting the original cinematographers of each films whenever possible. Subtitles and watermarks, if present, are also removed in the process. The process also involves the restoration and remastering of sound. This involves the syncing of sound to the picture and the removal of unnecessary noises such as eradicate pops and whistles. Extreme measures were also done to remove copyrighted songs from some films. Dozens of technicians, engineers, and artists work hundreds of hours for each film with restoration cost ranging anywhere between twenty-five thousand pesos and ten million pesos per film.

== List of notable films restored ==
A still image from Ishmael Bernal's 1982 film Himala illustrating the difference between the old and the restored version.

Title	Director	Year		Video restoration facility
Title	Director	Year released	Year restored	Video restoration facility
Himala	Ishmael Bernal	1982	2012	Central Digital Lab Inc. (Makati City, Metro Manila)
Home Along Da Riles: The Movie	Johnny Manahan	1993	2012	Central Digital Lab Inc. (Makati City, Metro Manila)
Madrasta	Olivia M. Lamasan	1996	2012	Central Digital Lab Inc. (Makati City, Metro Manila)
Oro, Plata, Mata	Peque Gallaga	1982	2012	Central Digital Lab Inc. (Makati City, Metro Manila)
Ganito Kami Noon, Paano Kayo Ngayon	Eddie Romero	1976	2013	Central Digital Lab Inc. (Makati City, Metro Manila)
Nagalit ang Buwan sa Haba ng Gabi	Danny L. Zialcita	1983	2013	Central Digital Lab Inc. (Makati City, Metro Manila)
Isprikitik (Walastik Kung Pumitik)	Efren "Loging" Jarlego	1999	2013	Central Digital Lab Inc. (Makati City, Metro Manila)
Hindi Nahahati ang Langit	Mike De Leon	1985	2014	Central Digital Lab Inc. (Makati City, Metro Manila)
Milan	Olivia M. Lamasan	2004	2014	Central Digital Lab Inc. (Makati City, Metro Manila)
Kapag Langit ang Humatol	Laurice Guillen	1990	2014	Central Digital Lab Inc. (Makati City, Metro Manila)
Minsan, Minahal Kita	Olivia M. Lamasan	2000	2014	Central Digital Lab Inc. (Makati City, Metro Manila)
T-Bird at Ako	Danny L. Zialcita	1982	2015	Central Digital Lab Inc. (Makati City, Metro Manila)
Tanging Yaman	Laurice Guillen	2000	2015	Central Digital Lab Inc. (Makati City, Metro Manila)
Bagong Buwan	Marilou Diaz-Abaya	2001	2015	Central Digital Lab Inc. (Makati City, Metro Manila)
Bata, Bata... Pa'no Ka Ginawa?	Chito Roño	1998	2015	Central Digital Lab Inc. (Makati City, Metro Manila)
Dekada '70	Chito Roño	2002	2015	Central Digital Lab Inc. (Makati City, Metro Manila)
Sarah, Ang Munting Prinsesa	Romy V. Suzara	1995	2015	Central Digital Lab Inc. (Makati City, Metro Manila)
Maalaala Mo Kaya: The Movie	Olivia M. Lamasan	1994	2015	Central Digital Lab Inc. (Makati City, Metro Manila)
Nagsimula sa Puso	Mel Chionglo	1990	2015	Central Digital Lab Inc. (Makati City, Metro Manila)
Sana Maulit Muli	Olivia M. Lamasan	1995	2015	Central Digital Lab Inc. (Makati City, Metro Manila)
Pare Ko	Jose Javier Reyes	1995	2015	Central Digital Lab Inc. (Makati City, Metro Manila)
Kakabakaba Ka Ba?	Mike De Leon	1980	2015	L'Immagine Ritrovata (Bologna, Italy)
Karnal	Marilou Diaz-Abaya	1983	2015	Central Digital Lab Inc. (Makati City, Metro Manila)
Virgin People	Celso Ad. Castillo	1984	2015	Central Digital Lab Inc. (Makati City, Metro Manila)
Ikaw Ay Akin	Ishmael Bernal	1978	2015	Central Digital Lab Inc. (Makati City, Metro Manila)
Anak	Rory B. Quintos	2000	2015	Central Digital Lab Inc. (Makati City, Metro Manila)
Kung Mangarap Ka't Magising	Mike De Leon	1977	2016	Central Digital Lab Inc. (Makati City, Metro Manila)
Cain at Abel	Lino Brocka	1982	2016	Central Digital Lab Inc. (Makati City, Metro Manila)
Haplos	Antonio Jose Perez	1982	2016	Central Digital Lab Inc. (Makati City, Metro Manila)
Tatlong Taong Walang Diyos	Mario O'Hara	1976	2016	L'Immagine Ritrovata (Bologna, Italy)
Magic Temple	Peque Gallaga	1996	2016	Central Digital Lab Inc. (Makati City, Metro Manila)
Kasal?	Laurice Guillen	1980	2016	Central Digital Lab Inc. (Makati City, Metro Manila)
Basta't Kasama Kita	Rory B. Quintos	1995	2016	Central Digital Lab Inc. (Makati City, Metro Manila)
Labs Kita... Okey Ka Lang?	Jerry Lopez Sineneng	1998	2017	Central Digital Lab Inc. (Makati City, Metro Manila)
Hihintayin Kita sa Langit	Carlos Siguion-Reyna	1991	2017	Central Digital Lab Inc. (Makati City, Metro Manila)
Moral	Marilou Diaz-Abaya	1982	2017	L'Immagine Ritrovata (Bologna, Italy)
Hataw Na	Jose Javier Reyes	1995	2017	Central Digital Lab Inc. (Makati City, Metro Manila)
Sa Aking mga Kamay	Rory B. Quintos	1996	2017	Central Digital Lab Inc. (Makati City, Metro Manila)
Cedie	Romy V. Suzara	1996	2017	Central Digital Lab Inc. (Makati City, Metro Manila)
Tag-Ulan sa Tag-Araw	Celso Ad. Castillo	1975	2017	Central Digital Lab Inc. (Makati City, Metro Manila)
High School Scandal	Gil Portes	1981	2017	L'Immagine Ritrovata (Bologna, Italy)
Karma	Danny L. Zialcita	1981	2017	L'Immagine Ritrovata (Bologna, Italy)
Langis at Tubig	Danny L. Zialcita	1980	2017	Central Digital Lab Inc. (Makati City, Metro Manila)
Don't Give Up on Us	Joyce Bernal	2006	2017	Central Digital Lab Inc. (Makati City, Metro Manila)
May Minamahal	Jose Javier Reyes	1993	2018	L'Immagine Ritrovata (Bologna, Italy/Hong Kong)
Ikaw Pa Lang ang Minahal	Carlos Siguion-Reyna	1992	2018	Central Digital Lab Inc. (Makati City, Metro Manila)
Sa Init ng Apoy	Romy V. Suzara	1980	2018	L'Immagine Ritrovata (Bologna, Italy)
Banaue: Stairway to the Sky	Gerardo de Leon	1975	2018	Kantana Post-Production Co. Ltd. (Thailand)
Nunal sa Tubig	Ishmael Bernal	1976	2018	Kantana Post-Production Co. Ltd. (Thailand)
John en Marsha '85 sa Probinsya	Jett C. Espiritu	1985	2018	Kantana Post-Production Co. Ltd. (Thailand)
Omeng Satanasia	Frank Gray Jr.	1977	2018	Kantana Post-Production Co. Ltd. (Thailand)
Minsa'y Isang Gamu-gamo	Lupita Aquino-Kashiwara	1976	2018	Kantana Post-Production Co. Ltd. (Thailand)
Biyudo si Daddy, Biyuda si Mommy	Tony Y. Reyes	1997	2018	Central Digital Lab Inc. (Makati City, Metro Manila)
Paano ang Puso Ko?	Rory B. Quintos	1997	2018	Central Digital Lab Inc. (Makati City, Metro Manila)
Saan Ka Man Naroroon	Carlos Siguion-Reyna	1993	2019	Central Digital Lab Inc. (Makati City, Metro Manila)
Bad Bananas sa Puting Tabing	Peque Gallaga	1983	2019	Kantana Post-Production Co. Ltd. (Thailand)
Mga Bilanggong Birhen	Mario O'Hara & Romy Suzara	1977	2019	Central Digital Lab Inc. (Makati City, Metro Manila)
Ang TV Movie: The Adarna Adventure	Johnny Manahan	1996	2019	Central Digital Lab Inc. (Makati City, Metro Manila)
Biyaya ng Lupa	Manuel Silos	1959	2019	ABS-CBN Film Archives (Quezon City, Metro Manila)
Malvarosa	Gregorio Fernandez	1958	2019	ABS-CBN Film Archives (Quezon City, Metro Manila)
Tisoy!	Ishmael Bernal	1977	2019	Kantana Post-Production Co. Ltd. (Thailand)
Misteryo sa Tuwa	Abbo Q. dela Cruz	1984	2019	Kantana Post-Production Co. Ltd. (Thailand and India); L'Immagine Ritrovata (Bologna, Italy)
Bulaklak sa City Jail	Mario O'Hara	1984	2019	Kantana Post-Production Co. Ltd. (Thailand)
Aguila	Eddie Romero	1980	2019	FPJ Studios (Quezon City, Metro Manila)
Captain Barbell	Jose Wenceslao	1973	2019	Kantana Post-Production Co. Ltd. (Thailand)
Kailangan Kita	Rory B. Quintos	2002	2020	Central Digital Lab Inc. (Makati City, Metro Manila)
Minsan Lang Kita Iibigin	Chito S. Roño	1994	2020	Central Digital Lab Inc. (Makati City, Metro Manila)
Markova: Comfort Gay	Gil Portes	2000	2020	Central Digital Lab Inc. (Makati City, Metro Manila)
Inagaw Mo ang Lahat sa Akin	Carlos Siguion-Reyna	1995	2020	Central Digital Lab Inc. (Makati City, Metro Manila)
Ibong Adarna	Vicente Salumbides	1941	2020	ABS-CBN Film Archives (Quezon City, Metro Manila)
Badjao	Lamberto V. Avellana	1957	2020	ABS-CBN Film Archives (Quezon City, Metro Manila)
Anak Dalita	Lamberto V. Avellana	1956	2020	ABS-CBN Film Archives (Quezon City, Metro Manila)
Radio Romance	Jose Javier Reyes	1996	2021	Central Digital Lab Inc. (Makati City, Metro Manila)
Kung Mawawala Ka Pa	Jose Mari Avellana	1993	2021	Central Digital Lab Inc. (Makati City, Metro Manila)
Tinimbang ang Langit	Danny L. Zialcita	1982	2021	Kantana Post-Production Co. Ltd. (Thailand)
Soltero	Pio De Castro III	1984	2021	Kantana Post-Production Co. Ltd. (Thailand)
Prinsipe Teñoso	Gregorio Fernandez	1954	2021	ABS-CBN Film Archives (Quezon City, Metro Manila)
The Graduation	Luciano B. Carlos	1969	2021	ABS-CBN Film Archives (Quezon City, Metro Manila)
Hey Babe	Joyce Bernal	1999	2021	Central Digital Lab Inc. (Makati City, Metro Manila)
Paano Kita Iibigin	Joyce Bernal	2007	2021	Central Digital Lab Inc. (Makati City, Metro Manila)
Ang Pulubi at Ang Prinsesa	Jerry Lopez Sineneng	1997	2021	Central Digital Lab Inc. (Makati City, Metro Manila)
Kasal, Kasali, Kasalo	Jose Javier Reyes	2006	2021	Central Digital Lab Inc. (Makati City, Metro Manila)
Hanggang Kailan Kita Mamahalin	Olivia M. Lamasan	1997	2021	Central Digital Lab Inc. (Makati City, Metro Manila)
Sandata at Pangako	F. H. Constantino	1961	2021	ABS-CBN Film Archives (Quezon City, Metro Manila)
Triplets	Florentino Garcia	1960	2022	ABS-CBN Film Archives (Quezon City, Metro Manila)
My Juan En Only	Frank Gray, Jr.	1982	2022	Central Digital Lab Inc. (Makati City, Metro Manila)
Mutya ng Pasig	Richard Abelardo	1950	2023	ABS-CBN Film Archives (Quezon City, Metro Manila)
Giliw Ko	Carlos Vander Tolosa	1939	2023	ABS-CBN Film Archives (Quezon City, Metro Manila)
Sumpaan	Susana C. De Guzman	1948	2024	ABS-CBN Film Archives (Quezon City, Metro Manila)
Shake, Rattle & Roll	Emmanuel H. Borlaza, Ishmael Bernal & Peque Gallaga	1984	2024	ABS-CBN Film Archives (Quezon City, Metro Manila)
Praybeyt Benjamin	Wenn Deramas	2011	2024	Central Digital Lab Inc. (Makati City, Metro Manila)
Kailan Ka Magiging Akin	Chito S. Roño	1991	2025	ABS-CBN Film Archives (Quezon City, Metro Manila)
Tatlong Ina, Isang Anak	Mario O'Hara	1987	2025	ABS-CBN Film Archives (Quezon City, Metro Manila)
