= ATBP: Awit, Titik at Bilang na Pambata =

Philippine children's television series

- Title card from 1994 to 1995
- Also known as: A.T.B.P. Awit, Titik, Bilang, atbp. Awit, Titik, Bilang, at iba pa!
- Genre: Children's television series Educational
- Written by: Don Cuaresma; Richard Reynante
- Directed by: Laurenti M. Dyogi
- Starring: see cast
- Theme music composer: Idonnah C. Lopez
- Opening theme: "ATBP Theme Song" by Justine de Jesus, Jeanneth Peralta, Herchel Baliwas and Celso Portentado
- Composer: Idonnah C. Lopez
- Country of origin: Philippines
- Original language: Filipino

Production
- Executive producer: Gilbert G. Perez
- Animators: Joy Cosme; Camille de Leon
- Editors: Carmelo Espiritu; Gilbert Perez; Maribel Trumata; Boloy Malapira
- Running time: 30 minutes (1994-1997); 60 minutes (1997-1998)
- Production company: ABS-CBN Production

Original release
- Network: ABS-CBN
- Release: March 14, 1994 – March 29, 1998

ATBP: Awit, Titik at Bilang na Pambata (lit. 'etc.: song, letter, and number for kids') is a Philippine educational children's television series that combines live-action, sketch comedy, animation, and puppetry. It was aired on ABS-CBN from March 14, 1994, to March 29, 1998.

Dubbed as the "Filipino Sesame Street", the show aims to help and teach Filipino children love and values in their native language.

== Cast ==
- Isay Alvarez as Ate Remy
- Raul Arellano as Mang Bertíng
- Dois Riego de Dios as Mang Arman
- Zeus Inocencio as Mang Pol
- Amiel Leonardia as Mang Lino
- Lorna Lopez as Bb. Carunungan [Ms. Carunungan]
- Jake Macapagal as Dr. Millares
- Charmaine Nueros as Aling Becky
- Piolo Pascual as Miguel
- Janice Pronstroller as Mrs. Millares
- Ama Quiambao as Aling Tinay
- Archie Diaz as Mang Erníng
- Grace Ann Bodegon as Ate Nila

=== The kids ===
- Patricia Anne Roque (later Trish Roque)
- Karina Mae "Kara" Cruz
- Rex Agoncillo
- Charlotte Lugo
- Karl Angelo Legaspi
- Sheila Lynn Diamse
- Peter Fernández
- Kristine Patelo
- Richard Legarda
- Calling Vélez
- Aba Chiongson
- Paulo Miguel Rebong
- Tanya Paula Iwakawa
- Karla Mae Silvestre
- Chris Emerson Lubi
- Marc Anthony Martínez

=== The puppets ===
- Pipo (a dog)
- Tingtíng (a cat)
- Kapitán Bilang (“Captain Number”, A captain)
- Donya Kilatis (“Doña Investigate”, a teacher)
- Ook Band (a band of frogs)
- Smokey and the Boondocks (a music group)
- Bebong (a rubbish monster based on Oscar the Grouch of Sesame Street)

=== Animated characters ===
- Pito (a humanoid sketch)
- Mr. Sulat (“Mr Write”, a pencil)
- Maestro (a painter)

== Running gags and songs ==
=== Opening Billboard ===
In the show's first year, the opening animated sequence begins with a seven-note tune before the egg hatches into a bird on the tree where the kids playing hide-and-seek before the theme song plays, the kids running with the cat and the dog to see the castle made of building blocks seeing the show title. Animated characters Pito, Mr. Sulat and Maestro are also appearing in the first OBB; the theme song ended with the line "Awit, titik, bilang at iba pa" two times before the chant "At iba pa!" to reveal the show title, which is like the song liners in music sheets. Later in 1995, coinciding with the reformat of the show, the theme song was later orchestrated and sung slightly faster with a newer animated OBB sequence featuring the animated versions of its puppets, Pipo, Tingting, Bebong, Kapitan Bilang, Donya Kilatis and Smokey and the Boondocks. Animated characters Pito, Mr. Sulat and Maestro from the first OBB returned for the new billboard. The billboard ends with the line "Awit, titik, bilang at iba pa" two times (from the first OBB); but with adding a newer line, "Awit, Titik, Bilang...." Before the chant, "At iba pa!" and CGI blocks to reveal the show title.

=== Letter of the Day ===
Following the playing of "Alphabetong Filipino" song, they tell the letter featured on the program (Example: Letter A); some episodes may also appearing with puppets like Donya Kilatis or animated characters like Mr. Sulat wanted to write the letter featured.

=== Alphabetong Filipino ===
The Letter of the Day portion had preceded on the show with the singing of the song Alphabetong Filipino; which is sung by the kids, the puppets or cast members, sometimes, celebrity guests may also appear in singing the song on some occasional episodes.

=== Number of the Day ===
The show also including the Number of the Day portion of which what number is featured (Example: Number 8); some episodes may include the Number of the Day in the "Kaptian Bilang" segments; as well as the singing the featured number performed by the puppet band Ook Band. The segments were preceded on the show with singing of the "Awit ng Bilang."

=== Awit ng Bilang ===
The number segment appears with the singing of the "Awit ng Bilang" performed by the kids, the puppets, cast members, or celebrity guests. There are two different lines in the song; Numbers 1-10 includes the line "Bililang ba Ninyo, Sige na, Ulit-Ulitin Nyo!" (lit. "Do You Remember, Come on, Repeat Again!") and Numbers 1-15 or 1-20 may include the line "Magbilang mula sa umpisa, Sige na, Ulit-Ulitin Pa!" (lit. "Count from the beginning, Go on, Repeat Again!").

=== Smokey and the Boondocks ===
Smokey and the Boondocks, the fictional puppet pop music group of the show, sings their different topics related to every episode. Most songs appear with voiceover opening line "(song name) aawitin sa inyo ng Smokey and the Boondocks!" (lit. "(song name) proudly performed by Smokey and the Boondocks!").

== Broadcast ==
The show was aired on weekdays from 1994 onwards, but in 1997, it was moved to Sunday mornings. It was also expanded to 1 hour with its reformat as a weekly children's program. As of 2025, the show aired as a re-run on A2Z and Knowledge Channel.

== Accolades ==
Year	Award	Category	Work	Result
1995	9th PMPC Star Awards for Television	Best Children Show	Cast and Crew	Won
1995	9th PMPC Star Awards for Television	Best Children Show Host	Isay Alvarez	Won
1996	10th PMPC Star Awards for Television	Best Children Show	Cast and Crew	Won

== See also ==
- List of programs aired by ABS-CBN
- Batibot
