= Misteryo sa Tuwa =

1984 period crime thriller film by Abbo Q. Dela Cruz

- The poster of the restored version, released in 2019 and designed by Justin Besana.
- Directed by: Abbo Q. Dela Cruz
- Written by: Abbo Q. Dela Cruz
- Produced by: Charo Santos-Concio; Madeleine Gallaga; Ching T. Dacuycuy
- Starring: Tony Santos Sr.; Johnny Delgado; Ronnie Lazaro; Alicia Alonzo; Amable Quiambao; Maria Montes; Vangie Labalan; Lito Anzures
- Cinematography: Rody Lacap
- Edited by: Jess Navarro
- Music by: Jaime Fabregas; Nonong Buencamino
- Production company: Experimental Cinema of the Philippines (Note: The film's ownership rights is currently controlled by ABS-CBN Corporation.)
- Distributed by: ABS-CBN Film Productions (restored version)
- Release date: December 25, 1984
- Running time: 122 minutes
- Country: Philippines
- Language: Filipino

Misteryo sa Tuwa (English: Joyful Mystery) is a 1984 Philippine period crime thriller film written and directed by Abbo Q. Dela Cruz. Set in the town of Lucban, Quezon in 1950, the story follows three men, Ponsoy (Tony Santos Sr.), Mesiong (Johnny Delgado), and Jamin (Ronnie Lazaro), who discovered and retrieved a suitcase from a plane crash site and never reported it to the authorities and when the authorities approach Alcalde Valle, the town's mayor, to help find the suitcase, the latter makes a sinister plan to steal the money out of greed. It also stars Amable Quiambao, Alicia Alonzo, Maria Montes, Vangie Labalan, and Lito Anzures, with extras, in a film that tackles greed, corruption, and hatred.

Produced and distributed by the Experimental Cinema of the Philippines, it was first screened overseas via the 7th PIA Film Festival in Japan, the 9th Toronto International Film Festival in Canada, and the 20th Chicago International Film Festival in the United States. It was later released domestically on December 25, 1984, as one of the official entries for 10th Metro Manila Film Festival.

In 2019, the film was digitally restored and remastered by ABS-CBN Film Restoration, with assistance from L’Immagine Ritrovata, Kantana Post-Production, and Wildsound Studios.

== Plot ==
On the morning of August 19, 1950, in the village where an army outpost is situated, the three men, Ponsoy, Mesiong, and Jamin, along with their families, are on their way home after the baptism of Ponsoy and Ada's son, Tiko. However, as they were almost at their destination, the military jeep broke down, and they were forced to walk on foot to the village. Despite the earlier problem, they were still on their way while the villagers were preparing, and then they invited Captain Salgado and the people at the camp to the occasion. By the time they arrived, the celebration started to become joyous when the villagers began to enjoy the music, dancing, and the food and drinks they served.

Suddenly, as the villagers and soldiers enjoyed the occasion, a plane crashed into the nearby forest, and they began running for help. Moments later, they, including the trio, began to check the remains of the plane, but instead of searching for survivors and recovering the remains of dead passengers, they started looting whatever they found in the said area, ranging from food to clothes, much to Captain Salgado's dismay, and he told them to help with the soldiers instead. While looting, Jamin discovered a black briefcase, and it belonged to a dead American passenger nearby. However, Mesiong and Ponsoy believed that the suitcase's contents might be a bomb, but when Castro showed up, they left the area. As they are still looting, a gunshot is heard, and the villagers believe that the Huks are back and flee as the soldiers handle the situation.

At night, the people are happy with the loot they have recovered from the plane crash. In the case of Mesiong, Jamin, and Ponsoy, the contents of the black briefcase remain mysterious, and they still believe that it is a bomb. While no one is watching, they decide to open the briefcase, but when it is opened, they are surprised when they discover that the suitcase's contents are no other than money, and they begin to divide every share among each other. The next day, Pedro Valle, the town mayor, arrived with the soldiers, medical personnel, and two Chinese businessmen, although the people thought that the Japanese soldiers had returned. In the captain's office, the Chinese businessmen and Mayor Valle informed Captain Salgado about the plane crash, and the suitcase they wanted to find belonged to an American named Mr. Murphy, the business partner of the former. As the people and personnel help retrieve the dead from the plane crash, they discover the remains of the American, but his briefcase is gone.

Meanwhile, the trio still has no idea what they will do with the money they got from the recovered briefcase, but Jamin is worried about Castro due to the said thing. While the personnel are leaving for Manila, Castro tells Mayor Valle about the briefcase, and the latter makes a deal with him. Castro agrees to the deal and admits to him that he was fed up with living in the camp. Worried about the rumors, Mesiong said that the money now belonged to the trio themselves, and he would threaten to kill them if someone wanted to take back the money they got from the briefcase.

At the town's center, or "poblacion", the townsfolk gathered together at the Anti-Rat Campaign, and Mayor Valle was present at the event. As the town secretary began to talk, Mayor Valle began creating a plan to take back the briefcase with Santos, who had second thoughts about the plan he had created. On the following day, Mayor Valle returns to the camp and talks with the other men, especially Castro, about the plan privately. Moments later, Ponsoy, Mesiong, Jamin, and the rest of the loggers return home, but at night, things get even worse. A group of men, whose heads were covered with bayong, began terrorizing the village, kidnapping the trio one by one, and when Didong came to check at Mesiong's house, he was shot to death, leading to the panic of the villagers and soldiers. After Santos informed Mayor Valle of the success and started to regret it, the latter told the former that there would be no back-outs in the mission. The following morning, Mayor Valle furiously arrived at the camp and asked Captain Salgado where Castro was.

Within the mountains, the trio was tied up and held hostage by the men led by Castro, whom Captain Salgado had noticed had shown unusual behavior in the previous days. Ponsoy, Mesiong, and Jamin were tortured and interrogated by Castro one by one, and he asked where the briefcase was. On the day of Didong's funeral, a group of Hukbalahap arrived in the village, but they told them that they were not involved in the crime of kidnapping the trio and Didong's death. Later on, the trio continued to be tortured one by one while their whole bodies (except their heads) were buried in the ground until the captors decided to kidnap Jamin's lover, Ising. In the village, Pinang and Ada begin to realize and suspect that Castro was involved in the kidnapping of their husbands, while the latter also realizes that Mayor Valle is a liar and untrustworthy.

At night, while Benito is on his way home from fishing, he discovers the location where the captors torture and hold hostage the trio, and he even witnesses the intimidation done by Castro to Ising. After seeing the whole act, he returned home immediately and informed Pinang, Ada, and the rest of his family about it. On the following morning, Mayor Valle and Santos prepared to go to the mountains to retrieve the money while the platoon of soldiers led by Captain Salgado begins their last mission (also in the mountains) before they were reassigned to the town capital. At the same time, Pinang and Ada decided to arm themselves and release their husbands from their captors.

As the wives finally arrived at the location and returned the briefcase, a battle between them followed. As Castro tried to flee with the briefcase, Pinang shot him in the leg before Ada could finish the job by stabbing him to death. After killing Castro and their fellow captors, the wives and Benito finally freed the trio and Ising, and they fled from the area immediately. Moments later, Mayor Valle and Santos finally reached the location, and despite discovering that Castro and the others were killed, they found the briefcase lying on the ground. As Santos gave the briefcase to the mayor, he was shot to death, and as he opened the briefcase, the platoon arrived, and a firefight began. The firefight between Mayor Valle and the platoon ended with the former being shot to death, and Captain Salgado, who was shot in the arm, discovered the nasty motives of the mayor and his men.

In the following days, the army outpost was dismantled as the personnel moved to the town capital. The film ends with the wedding of Jamin and Ising, and the village folk begin to enjoy themselves together.

== Cast ==
- Tony Santos Sr. as Ponsoy
- Johnny Delgado as Mesiong
- Ronnie Lazaro as Jamin
- Amable Quiambao as Ada
- Alicia Alonzo as Pinang
- Robert Antonio as Kapitan Salgado
- Lito Anzures as Castro
- Mario Taguiwalo as Alcalde Pedro Valle
- Maria Montes as Ising
- Ray Ventura as Santos
- Perry Fajardo as Marcial
- Susanna Faller as Inang Iska
- Romeo Igloria as Benito
- Mely Mallari as Marta
- Vangie Labalan as Marcela
- Benjamin Delina as Luis
- Wilfredo Saludares as Didong
- Filemon Faller as Julian
- Lorenza Nanong as Priscilla
- Kenneth Hutalla as Tiko
- Mary Jane Salvanerra as Pinang's Baby
- Susano Dealino as Secretary Cruz

The director and its crew members also hired the townspeople of Lucban, Quezon, and the Lucban Theatre Ensemble as extras for the film as well as the Armed Forces of the Philippines. Peque Gallaga, the director of Oro, Plata, Mata, played the role of a dead American passenger.

== Production ==
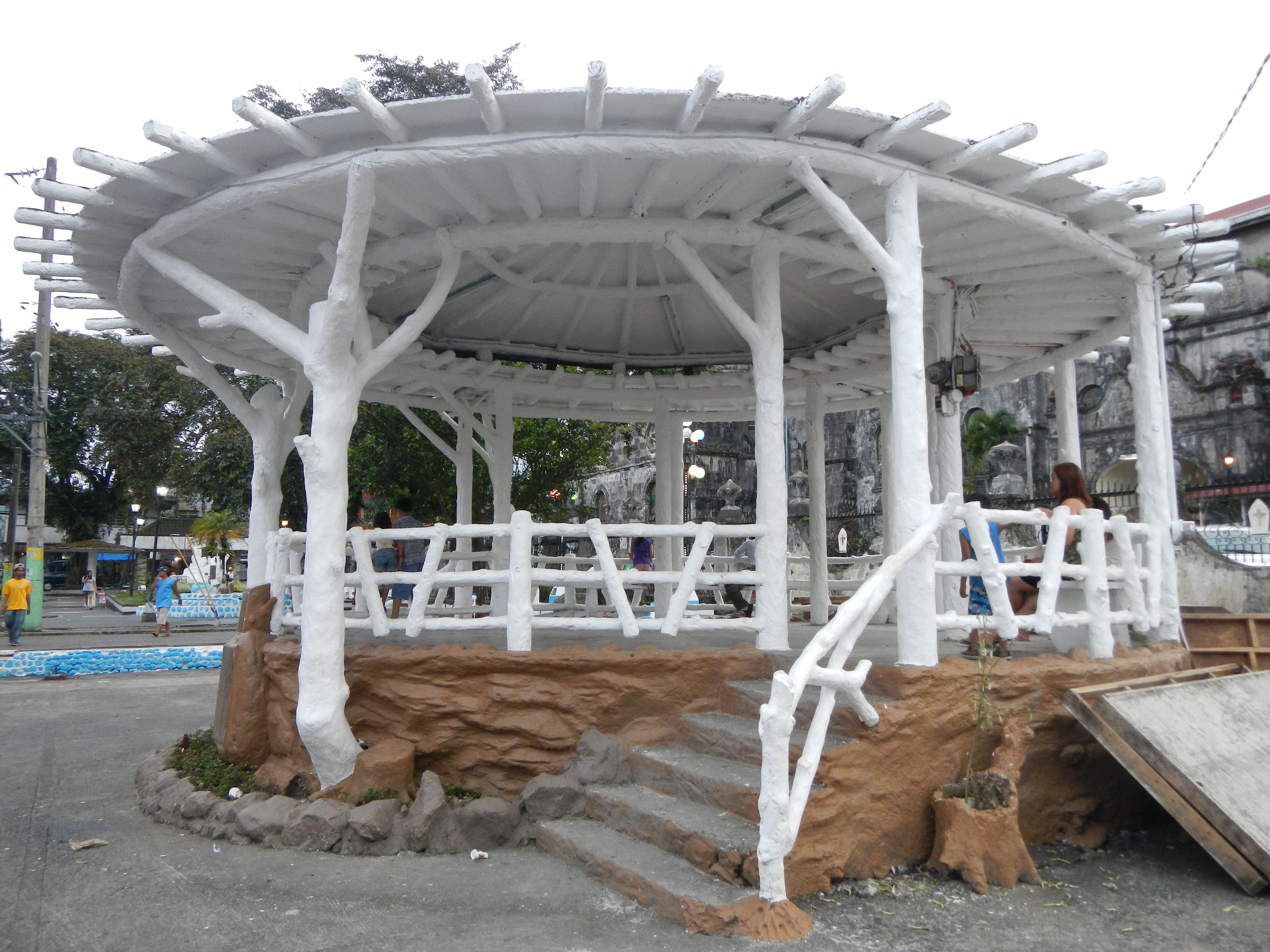
The gazebo in Lucban's town square (pictured in 2013) served as a venue for the Anti-Rat Campaign program in the film.

Misteryo sa Tuwa was adapted from a winning entry from the scriptwriting contest of ECP in 1982.

The film was shot in the town of Lucban, Quezon, the hometown of the director Abbo Q. Dela Cruz and his brother Rosauro "Uro" Q. Dela Cruz, who served as the crowd director of the film.

== Release ==
Misteryo sa Tuwa was released by the Experimental Cinema of the Philippines on December 25, 1984, as part of the 10th Metro Manila Film Festival. Before its domestic release in December, the film was first released in Japan on June 18, 1984, as one of the films exhibited for the 7th PIA Film Festival at PARCO Theater in Tokyo, Japan, and its literal Japanese title is also Joyful Mystery (Japanese: よろこびの神秘, Hepburn: Yorokobi no shinpi). It was later shown in Canada and the United States.

=== Digital restoration ===
The film was restored by the ABS-CBN Film Restoration through the Kantana Post-Production (Thailand) Co. Ltd. and L'Immagine Ritrovata for the image restoration from film prints, and Wildsound Studios for its color grading and audio restoration.

The film's cinematographer, Rody Lacap, provided restoration assistance for several scenes due to the deterioration of the surviving film prints. The whole restoration process of Misteryo sa Tuwa cost ₱5 million, and the total duration of restoring the film was 3,440 hours.

The restored version premiered on November 11, 2019, at the Ayala Malls Manila Bay as part of the Cinema One Originals film festival. The premiere was attended by Vangie Labalan (one of the film's surviving cast members), film editor Jess Navarro, and the representatives of the cast and crew members of the film who are deceased or unable to attend: Wanggo Gallaga (son of Peque and Madeleine Gallaga), Rose S. Alimon (daughter of Tony Santos Sr.), Teresita V. Dela Cruz (wife of the film's director), Esperanza "Espie" Dela Cruz-Salva (sister of the director and the film's wardrobe assistant), Juan Miguel Escudero (nephew of the film's production designer Don Escudero) and Eduardo R. Meñez, the head of the Office of Strategic Communications and Research - Department of Foreign Affairs.

== Reception ==
=== Critical reception ===
According to a review by Panos Kotzathanasis for Asian Movie Pulse, the film is considered "a great film that manages to communicate the plethora of its comments with utter eloquence, while entertaining significantly in the process." He praised the film's storyline and settings, the cast members, Rody Lacap's cinematography, and production designs by Rodell Cruz and Don Escudero. Hayley Scanlon of Windows on Worlds described the film as "both a tale of human greed and selfishness", owing to the scenes that were alluded or referenced to the then-Martial Law era. Matthew Ecosia of Film Geek Guy described the film's restoration as "far from perfect, but it is something special" and he praised the restoration efforts of ABS-CBN Film Restoration despite the encountered discolored and damaged frames that cannot be eliminated entirely by the restoration team. In terms of the film's story, he described it as "a tense display of how our drives as humans never really change regardless of time".

=== Accolades ===
Year	Award-Giving Body	Category	Recipient	Result
1985	Gawad Urian Awards	Best Cinematography	Rody Lacap	Won
1985	Gawad Urian Awards	Best Music	Jaime Fabregas	Nominated
1985	Gawad Urian Awards	Best Production Design	Rodell Cruz and Don Escudero	Won
1985	Gawad Urian Awards	Best Sound	Ramon Reyes	Nominated
