= Bienvenido Noriega Jr. =

Philippine playwright

Bienvenido Munoz Noriega Jr. (1952–1994) was a Philippine playwright.

== Early life and education ==
Bienvenido Munoz Noriega Jr. was born in Cauayan, Isabela as the second child of Bienvenido Noriega and Socorro Munoz of Cauayan and Cabatuan, Isabela, respectively. His native languages were Ilocano and Ibanag, but he picked up on Tagalog and English by renting Tagalog and Marvel comics. He finished elementary school at St. Ferdinand College in Ilagan, Isabela and secondary education at St. Anthony School, Singalong, Malate, Manila (Salutatorian, 1968). He completed A.B. Economics at the University of the Philippines within 3 years at the age of 18. After graduating cum laude and valedictorian of class of 1971, he went on to earn his M.A. Economics at the same university, again graduating as class valedictorian in 1973. He was college councilor and the Philippinensian yearbook editor. He wrote his first play Down the Basement in 1970 after attending a playwriting course at the University of the Philippines, which was eventually published in the Philippine Collegian Folio.

He was sent to the Harvard Kennedy School in 1979 for a master's degree in Public Administration (MPA). He graduated at the top of his Edward S. Mason Fellows class with straight A's. He then went for further studies in Columbia University for his Executive Program in Business Administration, finishing in 1983. While he was in those universities, he also took up courses such as Modern Drama, Shakespeare, Comedy and Film Theory.

== Career ==
He worked for the Philippine government for more than twenty years, starting at the National Economic and Development Authority as Director, Policy Coordination Staff. He was likewise the youngest to be appointed as Executive Vice President, Corporate Services at the Philippine National Bank, from 1981 to 1993. There he also served as president of PNB Investments Ltd and a director of PNB Securities Inc. He also taught part-time at U.P. Diliman, U.P. Manila, Ateneo de Manila University, De La Salle University, Assumption College, and the University of the East. Noriega worked for Experimental Cinema of the Philippines, Tanghalang Pilipino and was co-founder of Dramatis personæ. Noreiga died from cancer in 1994, aged just 42.

== Recognition and legacy ==
Bienvenido M. Noriega Jr. received posthumously two national honors. One was the Tanglaw ng Lahi award for Theater from the Ateneo de Manila University in 1995. The second was the prestigious Centennial Honors for the Arts in Theater from the Cultural Center of the Philippines and Philippine Centennial Commission in 1999.

Noriega was recipient of more than 22 major awards for writing – six from the Cultural Center of the Philippines, thirteen from the Carlos Palanca Memorial Awards for Literature, one each from Philippine Educational Theater Association (PETA), Experimental Cinema of the Philippines (ECP) and Palihang Aurelio Tolentino. He also received four National Book Awards from the Manila Critics Circle.

His award-winning works have been frequently staged by both professional and student theater companies in the country and in the US, Canada, UK. Athens, Geneva, Paris and as far as Qatar. He directed a lot of his plays and even delved in musicales writing the libretto for "Kenkoy loves Rosing" and "Bituing Marikit" and wrote the song lyrics of "Tuldukan na'ng hapis" for Basil Valdez.

== Creative works ==
His famous plays are Bayan-Bayanan, Ramona Reyes ng Forbes Park, Kanluran ng Buhay, Ang Mga Propesyonal, W.I.S (Walang Ibang Sabihin), Takas, Regina Ramos ng Greenwich Village, Kenkoy loves Rosing, Naikwento Lang Sa Akin, Juan Luna, Barkada, Kasalan sa Likod ng Simbahan, Batang Pro and Bongbong at Kris.

== Awards ==
=== National honors ===
- 1995 Tanglaw ng Lahi Award in Theater (Posthumous), Ateneo de Manila
- 1999 Centennial Honors for the Arts (Theater), Cultural Center of the Philippines and Philippine Centennial Commission

=== Cultural Center of the Philippines Awards ===
- 1975 Full Length Play Grand Prize Winner, "Bayan-bayanan"
- 1976 Full Length Play, Second Prize, "Ramona Reyes ng Forbes Park"
- 1976 Full Length Play Special Prize, " Kasalan sa Likod ng Simbahan"
- 1980 Full Length Play Third Prize, "W.I.S. (Walang Ibig Sabihin)"
- 1980 Full Length Play Special Prize, "Takas"
- 1986 Full Length Play Third Prize "Bongbong at Kris"

=== Palanca Awards ===
- 1975: One Act Play in Filipino, Special Prize: "Kulay Rosas na Mura ang isang Pangarap"
- 1976: Full length Play in Filipino, Special Prize: "Ang Artista sa Palengke"
- 1977: One Act Play in Filipino, Third Prize: "Kanluran ng Buhay"
- 1977: Full length Play in Filipino, Third Prize: "Talambuhay"
- 1978: Full length Play in Filipino, Third Prize: "Ang mga Propesyonal"
- 1981: Full length Play in Filipino, First Prize: "Mga Idolong Romantiko sa Isang Dulang Sumusuri ng Lipunan"
- 1981: Full-length Play in Filipino, Second Prize: "Juan Luna"
- 1981: One Act Play in Filipino, Second Prize: "Barkada"
- 1983: Full-length Play in Filipino, Second Prize: "Batang Pro"
- 1985: Full length Play in Filipino, Second Prize: "Pansamantalang Dilim"
- 1986: Full-length Play in Filipino, First Prize: "Bayan Mo"
- 1990: One Act Play in Filipino, Third prize: "Naikwento Lang Sa Akin"
- 1990: Full-length Play in Filipino, First Prize: "Deuterium

=== PETA ===
- 1973: Full Length Play, Second Prize: Tinangay si Napsa, Tinangay si Napsa"

=== Palihang Aurelio V. Tolentino ===
- 1980: One Act Play, Winner: "Lilipad pag Pinalad"

=== Musicales ===
- Kenkoy loves Rosing (libretto)
- Bituing Marikit (libretto)

=== Film screenplays ===
- Soltero, Experimental Cinema of the Philippines awardee
- Batang Pro

=== Manila Critics Circle, National Book Awards ===
- "Bayan-bayanan at Iba pang Dula" (1982)
- "Pares-pares" (1983)
- "Soltero", screenplay (1985)
- "Deuterium/Mga Idolong Romantiko" (1995)

=== Song lyrics ===
- "Tuldukan na'ng Hapis", Basil Valdez (1983)
