= Ama Quiambao =

Filipino film, television, and theater actress

Ama Quiambao Viray
- Born: Amable Quiambao; January 19, 1947; Bacacay, Albay, Philippines
- Died: July 5, 2013 (aged 66); Manila, Philippines
- Resting place: Arlington Memorial Chapel, Quezon City
- Occupations: Film, stage and TV actress
- Years active: 1982–2013
- Spouse: Gamaliel "Gammy" Viray (deceased)
- Children: Ishmael Viray
- Relatives: Medgardo Quiambao (brother); Lui Quiambao-Manansala (sister); Miriam Quiambao (niece)

Amable Quiambao (January 19, 1947 – July 5, 2013), better known by her stage name, Ama Quiambao, was a Filipino film, television and theater actress in the Philippines. She was best known for her roles in the films Himala and Diablo.

== Early life ==
She was born Amable Quiambao on January 19, 1947, in Bacacay, Albay and had two siblings: Medgardo and Lui.

== Personal life ==
She was married to former actor and bass-baritone opera singer Gamaliel "Gammy" Viray. The couple had only one son, Ishmael Viray. Her sister, Lui Quiambao-Manansala, is also an actress and her niece, Miriam Quiambao, was a former Binibining Pilipinas Universe winner and 1st runner-up at the Miss Universe 1999. She was also a former instructor of St. Paul University Quezon City for the students of AB Mass Communications.

== Theatre ==
Quiambao began her career as a theatre actress. Her first play was "Ang Mga Tagahabi", directed by Rolando Tinio (an adaptation of The Weavers by Gerhart Hauptmann), when she was a drama student at the Philippine Normal University in Manila in the 1970s. She later earned her Master's degree in Drama Education from the University of the Philippines Diliman. She became a regular performer at the Teatro Pilipino and Bulwagang Gantimpala theatre groups at the Cultural Center of the Philippines in Manila. She played the role of President Corazon Aquino at the 1986 political satire "Bongbong at Kris" at CCP's Bulwagang Gantimpala in 1986.

== Film ==
Ama made her film debut in 1982, when she starred in the movie Himala (Miracle), directed by Ishmael Bernal. Film director Bernal wanted to cast theatre and radio actors in Himala, so theatre director Rolando Tinio recommended the casting of Quiambao. She was chosen for the role of Sepa, a disciple of the lead character Elsa, played by Nora Aunor. Her role in Himala earned her a Best Supporting Actress nomination at the Gawad Urian Awards in 1982. She subsequently appeared in many other films. A restored version of Himala was screened at the 2012 Venice Film Festival to mark its 30th anniversary.

Three decades later, Quiambao was cast as Lusing in the 2012 film, Diablo, which was directed and produced by the married partners Mes de Guzman and Rhea Operaña de Guzman. Lusing was a very serious, strict character in the film, which Quiambao described as the opposite of her own personality.

Her work in Diablo earned Quiambao the first acting award of her career. In 2012, she won "Best Actress in the New Breed category" at the 8th Cinemalaya Independent Film Festival. In a later interview, Quiambao described her reaction to winning, "I was strangely calm,” she recalled. “I didn’t feel cold; I didn’t cry. I was glad that the trophy was presented to me by Iza [Calzado]. I’ve worked with her a number of times on TV and in the movies. I love that girl." She also said that she was thrilled to see other veteran Filipino actors win Cinemalaya awards that year, including Anita Linda and Eddie Garcia, which she called "the night of senior citizens."

== Death ==
Quiambao suffered a heart attack on June 28, 2013, while attending the premiere of the one-act play, Pamamanhikan, in which she was performing as part of the Virgin Labfest 9 theatre festival. She died at Capitol Medical Center in Quezon City at 8:09 p.m. on July 5, 2013, at the age of 65. Her funeral was held at the Arlington Memorial Chapels in Quezon City. Her younger sister, Lui Quiambao-Manansala, said that "she was surrounded by all members of her family and close relatives. Let us pray for the eternal rest of her soul... Let us all remember Ama with fondness as a colleague, a mentor and a friend." Quiambao's wake was held at Arlington Memorial Chapels in Quezon City.

Quiambao appeared posthumously in her final film, Ang Kwento Ni Mabuti.

== Filmography ==
=== Film ===
Year	Title	Role
1982	Himala	Sepa
1984	Misteryo sa Tuwa	Ada
1985	Sex Object	
1985	Virgin Forest	Nana Isay
1992	Guwapings: The First Adventure	
1993	Kailan Dalawa Ang Mahal?	
1993	Guwapings Dos	
1993	Ayoko Na Sanang Magmahal	
1993	Gaano Kita Kamahal	Rolly's mother
1994	Nag-Iisang Bituin	
1995	Hataw Na!	Linda Paguio
1996	Impakto	Lumeng
1996	Bayarang Puso	Pacita
1996	Bakit May Kahapon Pa?	Madrigal's Sister
1996	Radio Romance	Viring Palacios
1996	Mula Noon Hanggang Ngayon	
1996	Dyesebel	Instructress
1997	Sanggano	Lady Judge
1998	Ikaw Pa Rin Ang Iibigin	Tita Lena
1998	Curacha: Ang Babaeng Walang Pahinga	Nun
1999	Isusumbong Kita Sa Tatay Ko	Beth's aunt
2000	Mahal Kita, Walang Iwanan	Cynthia's aunt
2000	Minsan, Minahal Kita	Ellen
2000	Laro Sa Baga	Nana Trining
2001	Ano Bang Meron Ka?	Nun 1
2003	Masamang Ugat	Alicia
2005	Let the Love Begin	Aling Bella
2005	Tuli	
2006	Kaleldo	
2006	Moments of Love	Old Ceding
2006	Pandanggo	Aunt Hermie (segment "It Takes Two to Tango")
2007	Pisay	Lola
2008	Sisa	Lola Ising
2009	Tarot	Nana Upeng
2009	I Love Dreamguyz	Lola Lagring
2010	Layang Bilanggo	Lola Maggie
2012	Diablo	
2012	Loida	Lola Tining
2013	Ang Misis ni Meyor	
2013	Amor y Muerte	
2013	Ang Kwento ni Mabuti	

=== Television ===
Year	Title	Role
1994–1995	ATBP: Awit, Titik at Bilang na Pambata	Aling Tinay
1996–1997	Anna Karenina	
1998	Bayani	Lola
1998–1999	Esperanza	Lola Belen
2000	Marinella	Carmen
2003	Ang Iibigin Ay Ikaw Pa Rin	
2004	Krystala	
2007	Impostora	Rosa
2007	Kung Mahawi Man Ang Ulap	Hon. Amelia R. Santos
2008	Your Song: Superstar ng Buhay Ko	Yaya
2008	Komiks: Tiny Tony	Lola Marge
2008	MMK: Bus	Formation Directress
2008	MMK: Isda	Old Isiang
2009	Your Song: Boystown	Aling Sion
2009	The Bud Brothers	Nay Enciang
2009–2010	Nagsimula sa Puso	Dean dela Peña
2010	Your Song: My Last Romance	Yaya Mel
2011–2012	Budoy	Atty. Javier
2011–2012	Ikaw ay Pag-Ibig	Flora Javier
2012	Alice Bungisngis and her Wonder Walis	Lola Anita
2012–2013	Sana ay Ikaw na Nga	Fortune teller
2012	MMK: Belen	Belen
2013	Mundo Mo'y Akin	Esperanza
