= Forsaken House =

Play written by Wilfrido Maria Guerrero

- Written by: Wilfrido Maria Guerrero

Premiere
- Date: 1947

Forsaken House is a play written by Wilfrido Maria Guerrero, published in his 13 Plays (1947).

== Characters ==
- Ramon – the head of the family
- Encarna – submissive wife

=== The children ===
- Teresita – eldest daughter, most self-possessed of the children
- Clemencia – tiny and weak of constitution, nervous by temperament
- Adeling – pretty, strong-willed and impulsive, librarian in a university
- Jorge – the eldest brother
- Flavio – most reserved of the brothers, his reserved nature is dangerous, his brooding eyes reveal strange longings and desires which led him to become a blacksmith
- Gonzalo – the youngest of the family and had sex with a prostitute
- Tony – the prodigal son who ran away to the U.S and is said to be gay

=== Other characters ===
- Matteo Sunga
- Tio Carlos
- Tio Koleyt
- Tia Pelagia
- Tia Pusit
- Nilda
- Jethro Jake
- Mr. Sarte
- Servant
- Policeman

== Time ==
- First Act - seven in the evening
- Second Act - two weeks later, eight in the evening
- Third Act - three weeks later, eight-thirty in the evening

== Setting ==
The play is set in a dimly lit, richly furnished living room.

== Synopsis ==
=== The main conflict ===
The conflict of the plot revolved around the character of Ramon. As the father, Ramon is absolutely convinced that it is only his will that must be obeyed by all the members of his family. His rigidity provoked a miniature revolt among his children. Tony, a character vaguely described in the story was the first to express his outrage against the severity of the condition. He decided to leave and settle in the United States. As a result, his father considers him no longer as his son and forbids his name to be mentioned in the house.

Act one started with the obvious abhorrence expressed by the children by seeking an explanation from their mother why they were treated as if they were irresponsible adults devoid of judgment. All the children felt their existences were restricted within the confines of their house. Encarna (the mother) reasoned with the children, telling them that their father knew what is best for them and was simply protecting them from the wickedness of the outside world. The comfort and luxury of the house, she insisted, should be good enough to spend their extra time. The children thought otherwise and demanded their mother to persuade their father to grant them more freedom and to live life without his lingering presence.

The argument the children had with their mother was an overture to the coming tragedy. The children were all resigned that their fate was solely controlled by their father and only through radical actions that they can recover and ultimately discover themselves.

=== Climax ===
The succeeding scenes were crafted to depict the intense yearning of the children to get away from the commanding presence of their father. Adeling decided to abandon her family together with Jethro Jake. The consequence of her act produced a more rigorous control from the father allowing the rest of the children to increase their sufferings. When Adeling left, Clemencia was utterly distressed and got sick with anemia. Jorge on the other hand was reprimanded by his father when his teacher, Prof. Sarte, informed his father that he stole money (forty pesos) from his class fund. Both Flavio and Gonzalo had brought home their own version of troubles; the latter was infected with syphilis from an unrespectable woman and Flavio was shot and killed during a fight in a cabaret. After witnessing all these painful episodes in the family, Clemencia finally retired and in a peculiar way somehow liberated herself from her father's tyranny.

Before all these events took place, Tio Carlos was constantly reminding Ramon that the children felt intense suffocation the way how things transpire in the house. Carlos tried to deliver the message to Ramon, even questioning the way how he rears his children and insisted that a different method is necessary to let the children experience life. Carlos argued that the reason why his children were acting strangely was primarily because they can no longer endure excess repressions. But his warning was plainly ignored and Ramon responded by further suppressing the will of his children. Tia Pelagia was another person who showed affection and to whom the children expressed their emotions and disgust.

=== Turning point ===
Ramon realized that the events that happened in the family proved that his ways were complete disaster. He felt absolute resignation and defeat; he had created hell inside his house that ruined the lives of his children.

=== Falling action ===
After recognizing his defeat, Ramon decided let go of his children and allowed them to make decisions for themselves. He finally gave Teresita his blessing to enter the convent and dedicate herself to God. Jorge was given permission to leave the house and find his own way. He also reconciled himself and admitted that Adeling had found her new home in the warm embrace of Jethro Jake.

=== Conclusion ===
Ramon Sampang made peace with his sick son Gonzalo, the only child left after all the rest decided to abandon the house. He showed his remorse by giving joy to his son by inviting him son to spend sometime in their country house in Sibul.

== Theme ==
The play revealed the dominance of male in the Filipino family. Though there were several female characters, the characters of Ramon and Carlos were imposing. The mother was projected as weak and somebody who readily submits to the will of her husband. The children though abhor the situation they still showed astounding reverence to their father which is customarily expected from Filipino children.

== Productions ==
The play was first staged by the Filipino Players under the author's direction at the Manila Grand Opera House on February 27, 1940.

Dulaang Unibersidad ng Pilipinas (DUP), the official performing group of the University of the Philippines, in celebration of Wilfrido Ma. Guerrero's centennial and to cap its 36th Season, staged The Forsaken House under the direction of theater icon Tony Mabesa. The play starred theater luminaries Irma Adlawan, Tess Dumpit, Leo Rialp, Ces Quesada, Espie Tinio-Garcellano, Menggie Cobarrubias and Joel Lamangan, together with the Dulaang UP ensemble and Eric Dela Cruz, Karen Gaerlan, and Zafrullah Masahud. It ran from February 15 to March 4, 2012, at the Wilfrido Ma. Guerrero Theater, UP Diliman. It was also performed at Angeles University Foundation, Angeles City.

In 1998, Pasundayag Theater Company staged "Adios Papa!", Mozart Pastrano's Cebuano adaptation of the play. Pasundayag Theater Company was a community theater based in Cagayan de Oro City, which was given the Panday Sining Grant from the Cultural Center of the Philippines, Tanghalang Pilipino in 1997. The play's main casts were among Cagayan de Oro City's most talented theater actors namely Enrico Ramon Lluch, Tatit Fajardo, Eddie Villaranda, and Ametta Suarez Taguchi.
