= Oro, Plata, Mata =

1982 war drama film by Peque Gallaga

- Original theatrical poster
- Directed by: Peque Gallaga
- Screenplay by: Jose Javier Reyes
- Story by: Peque Gallaga; Mario Taguiwalo; Conchita Castillo
- Produced by: Madeleine Gallaga; Charo Santos-Concio
- Starring: Cherie Gil; Sandy Andolong; Liza Lorena; Joel Torre; Kuh Ledesma
- Cinematography: Rody Lacap
- Edited by: Jesus Navarro
- Music by: Jose Gentica V
- Production company: Experimental Cinema of the Philippines
- Distributed by: Experimental Cinema of the Philippines; ABS-CBN Film Productions (Note: The film's copyright is currently held by ABS-CBN Corporation along with other ECP films: Himala, Soltero, and Misteryo sa Tuwa .) (restored version)
- Release date: January 27, 1982
- Running time: 194 minutes
- Country: Philippines
- Languages: Filipino; Spanish; English
- Budget: ₱2.5 million

Oro, Plata, Mata (English: Gold, Silver, Death) is a 1982 Philippine historical war drama film co-written and directed by Peque Gallaga. The screenplay written and adapted by Jose Javier Reyes was based on the story developed by Gallaga, Mario Taguiwalo, and Conchita Castillo. The film is considered to be Gallaga's most significant contribution to the Philippine cinema. Set in the Philippine island of Negros during World War II, it tells the story of how two hacendero families cope with the changes brought about by the war. In translation, the movie is also known either as "Gold, Silver, Bad Luck" or "Gold, Silver, Death."

The title refers to the traditional Spanish Filipino architectural superstition saying that design elements in a house (particularly staircases) should not end in a multiple of three, in keeping with a pattern of oro (gold), plata (silver), and mata (bad luck). The film is structured in three parts that depict this pattern played out in the lives of the main characters, from a life of luxury and comfort in the city ("oro/gold"), to a still-luxurious time of refuge in a provincial hacienda ("plata/silver"), and finally to a retreat deeper into the mountains, where they are victimized by guerilla bandits ("mata/bad luck").

Produced and distributed by Experimental Cinema of the Philippines as its initial offering, the film was theatrically released on January 27, 1982, and it was filmed on location in the whole province of Negros Occidental, primarily in Bacolod and the Mt. Kanlaon National Park. The production team received extensive assistance and support from the Ministry of National Defense, Ministry of Tourism, and the Armed Forces of the Philippines. The film's musical score was provided by Jose Gentica V; the film's photography was handled by Rody Lacap, and the editing was handled by Jesus Navarro. The film's development was financially supported and acknowledged by the Philippine National Bank.

In 2013, ABS-CBN Film Archives, in partnership with Central Digital Lab, digitally restored and remastered the film, and it was subsequently released in select theaters for a limited period. The digitally restored version was also released on DVD and iTunes.

== Opening quote ==
“The lights went out all over Europe and the young sought sweetness and light in the pictures of Deanna Durbin, a bright symbol of the era, and the young Susan Magalona, whose beauty had become a national topic. At the Crystal Arcade, the mezzanines still rang with the cries of "Gold! Gold! Gold!". The holocaust had been kindled, but the victims were unaware, and the nation swung confidently into the 1940s.

The decade of disaster fell into three unequal parts: the two years before the war; the period of the Japanese occupation; and the liberation era. No decade in our history was more eventual than this one... So vast now seems the difference between what we have become and what we were before disaster struck that, in the Philippine vernacular term "peacetime" means exclusively all the years before December 8, 1941. There has been no "peacetime" since then.”

— Nick Joaquin

According to the audio commentary by Peque Gallaga, he told the film's screenwriter, Jose Javier Reyes, to create a frame reference for the film, and the latter answered by citing a quote from Nick Joaquin. Peque agreed with the decision, and he revealed that he enjoyed reading his works.

== Plot ==
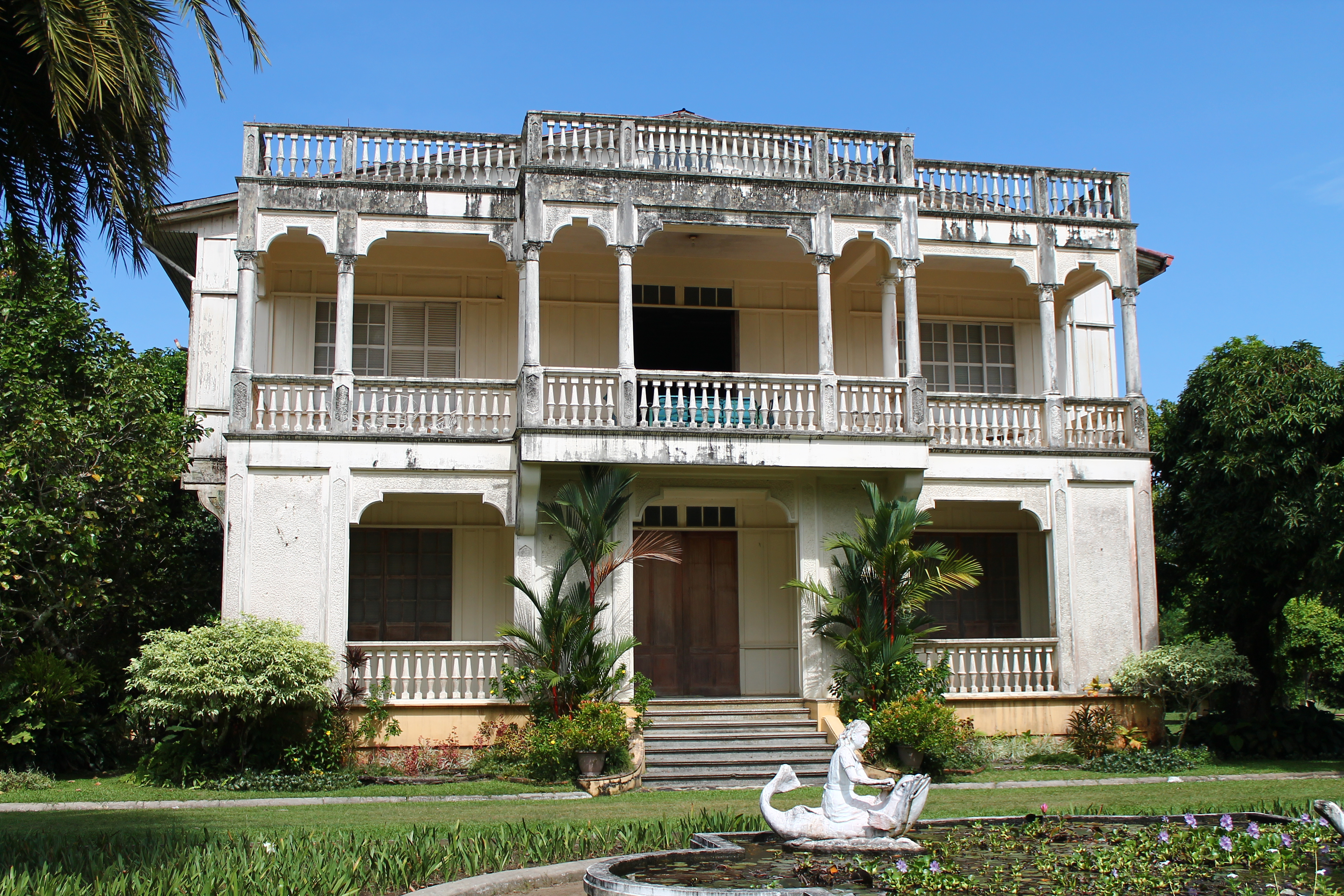
Hacienda Rosalia in Manapla served as the Lorenzo clan's residence.

In mid-December 1941, on the island of Negros, the Ojeda film celebrates Maggie's debut. In the garden, Trining receives her first kiss from Miguel Lorenzo, her childhood sweetheart. The Ojeda patriarch, Don Claudio, and his fellow landowners talk about the impending war as some of the young, able-bodied men enlist. The celebration is cut short by the news of the sinking of SS Corregidor by a mine. As the Japanese approach, the Ojedas accept the invitation extended by the Lorenzos, their old family friends, to stay with them in their provincial hacienda. Nena Ojeda and Inday Lorenzo try to deny the realities of war by preserving their pre-war lifestyle. Pining for her fiancé, Maggie goes through bouts of melancholy. Miguel and Trining turn from naughty children into impetuous adults.

Two more family friends, Jo Russell and Viring, join them in the refuge. As they witness the burning of the town and the Japanese nearing, the families evacuate to the Lorenzo family's forest lodge. A group of weary guerrillas arrives, and Jo tends to their injuries. The guerrillas leave a comrade, Hermes Mercurio, behind. Miguel endures more comments of the same kind when he fails to take action against a Japanese soldier who comes upon the girls bathing in the river and is killed by Hermes instead. Maggie comforts Miguel, who decides to learn how to shoot from Hermes. Later, Viring's jewelry is stolen by Melchor, Inday’s trusted foreman. He justifies his action as a reward for his services, but is promptly fired by Inday.

While Miguel and Hermes are away, Melchor and his band of thieves return and take revenge on their former masters. They raid the food supplies, slaughter the servants, rape Inday, and chop off Viring's fingers when she does not take off her ring. Despite the atrocities he and his men committed, Trining unexpectedly goes with the bandits. These experiences bring Maggie and Miguel closer together. Miguel urges the survivors to resume their mahjong games to help them cope with their trauma. Miguel is determined to hunt the bandits down and bring Trining back. He catches them in an abandoned hospital, but his courage is replaced with bloodlust, driving him to a killing spree. Miguel and Hermes finally kill Melchor and his men and rescue Trining.

After Liberation in 1945, a party is held in the Ojeda household to announce Maggie and Miguel's betrothal. The survivors attempt to reclaim their previous lifestyle, but the war has changed the world, just as it has forever changed each of them.

== Cast ==
Character	Actor / Actress
Trinidad "Trining" Ojeda	Cherie Gil
The feisty younger daughter of Nena and Andring Ojeda. She is Miguel's first love.
Margarita "Maggie" Ojeda	Sandy Andolong
The older daughter of Nena and Andring Ojeda. The family is celebrating her debut on the evening of December 8, 1941.
Nena Ojeda	Liza Lorena
The wife of the late Andring Ojeda, mother of Trining and Maggie, and daughter-in-law of Don Claudio. She and her whole family sought refuge at the Lorenzo household when the Japanese invaders were coming.
Lydia "Inday" Lorenzo	Fides Cuyugan-Asencio
The matriarch of the Lorenzo estate. Like Nena, she was a widow after her husband Pepito died. She is also a mother to two sons, Teodoro and Miguelito, but Teodoro died of unknown causes, leaving Miguelito as her only remaining son.
Miguelito "Miguel" Lorenzo	Joel Torre
The only remaining son of Inday and Pepito Lorenzo. His mother was very overprotective of him, and he was characterized as a "weakling," but when their family was pillaged by the bandits, he started a revenge attack against the bandits led by the foreman Melchor, igniting an endless firefight between him and his other men.
Don Claudio Ojeda	Manny Ojeda
The patriarch of the Ojeda estate. After the death of his only son, Andring, he acts as the father figure to his two granddaughters.
Jo Russell	Mitch Valdez
A progressive woman and doctor who seeks refuge at the Lorenzo household. She is married to an American.
Viring Ravillo	Lorli Villanueva
A friend of the Lorenzo household who also seeks refuge at their household with her family. Her husband lives in New York, but Viring remained stuck in the Philippines.
Hermes Mercurio	Ronnie Lazaro
One of the guerrilla soldiers serving under Minggoy. He acts as one of the protectors for the Lorenzo and Ojeda families who are staying in the mountain lodge.
Melchor	Abbo Q. Dela Cruz
A trusted foreman of the Lorenzo family until he was fired by Inday for stealing. He later leads a bandit guerrilla army and then be killed by their former employer's son, Miguel.
Minggoy	Jaime Fabregas
One of Don Claudio's fellow landowners. He also led a guerrilla army and is a trusted ally to the Lorenzo and Ojeda families.
Carlos Placido	Robert Antonio
Don Claudio's accountant and right-hand man.
Lucio	Agustin Gatia
One of the servants of the Lorenzo family who grew up with Miguel.
Diwata	Kuh Ledesma
A supernatural creature that lurks in the areas of Mt. Kanlaon. She can be depicted as the "Dalagang Filipina" who was abused and tortured by the Japanese and the Filipino bandit guerrillas.

== Release ==
Oro, Plata, Mata is the first film produced by the Experimental Cinema of the Philippines under Executive Order No. 770 by President Ferdinand E. Marcos. The film was first released on January 27, 1982, and it was approved to be shown by the Board of Censors for Motion Pictures. It was also shown in the United States on October 1, 1983, as part of the Chicago International Film Festival and in Japan on July 25, 1991, as part of the Filipino Movies Festival, which was sponsored and presented by the ASEAN Cultural Center.

=== Digital restoration ===
In the late 1990s, ABS-CBN originally planned to restore Oro, Plata, Mata, but the analog restoration costs exceeded 20 million pesos. According to Leo P. Katigbak, the head of ABS-CBN Film Archives, they did not proceed with the analog restoration of the film by fixing the film prints without addressing the defects in every frame. Eventually, the film was digitally restored and remastered in 2012 by the ABS-CBN Film Restoration and Central Digital Lab (supervised by Manet T. Dayrit and Rick Hawthorne). Peque Gallaga (the film's director) and Rody Lacap (the film's cinematographer) were involved in the restoration process. It is the second film to be restored by the ABS-CBN Film Restoration and Central Digital Lab.

Before the restoration commenced, the film print of the ABS-CBN Film Archives and two reserve prints were considered as the source of elements for the restoration, but the ABS-CBN archive print was chosen instead because the film's picture quality was better. Peque Gallaga was consulted in preserving the original colours of the film since the film print was already fading. Central Digital Lab took 1,871 manual hours to complete the film restoration and 80 hours for color grading. The film's audio was restored by Post Haste Sound Inc. in Los Angeles, California, United States. It was lifted from the Betacam tape and upgraded from mono audio to Dolby Digital 5.1 audio mix.

== Reception ==
=== Critical response ===
Film critic Noel Vera praised the whole film's narrative of the Second World War as "beautifully structured" with a reference of the architectural superstition to the film; the bright conception and development of the characters; and the whole screenplay being similar to the 1939 epic historical drama film Gone with the Wind, starring Clark Gable and Vivien Leigh. However, Peque Gallaga did not even reach the highs of Luchino Visconti's 1963 film The Leopard because there are no found references and symbolisms developed from the Italian film. As a result, the film is considered a "masterpiece", also praising its cinematography, screenplay, and production design.

Panos Kotzathanasis, writing for Asian Movie Pulse, also praised the film and described it as a "true epic masterpiece on every level", owing to the director guiding the story from a saga similar to the said Clark Gable-Vivien Leigh starrer to the part where it became reminiscent to Oliver Stone's Platoon and Francis Ford Coppola's Apocalypse Now. He also gave praise to the cast's performances, with Gil and Torre being "clear standouts"; the screenplay, which features evolving relationships and transformations of the characters that became integral to the story's "emotional core"; and Lacap's cinematography, aided by the technical aspects including production design, costumes, and make-up.

=== Accolades ===
The movie won the 1982 Gawad Urian awards for Best Picture, Direction, Cinematography, Production Design, Musical Score, and Sound. In the same year, it won the Luna Awards for Production Design and Best Supporting Actress (Liza Lorena). It is marketed as one of the top ten best films of the 1980s.

Year	Group	Category	Nominee	Result
1982	Gawad Urian Awards	Best Picture	Oro, Plata, Mata	Won
1982	Gawad Urian Awards	Best Director	Peque Gallaga	Won
1982	Gawad Urian Awards	Best Cinematography	Rody Lacap	Won
1982	Gawad Urian Awards	Best Production Design	Don Escudero and Rodell Cruz	Won
1982	Gawad Urian Awards	Best Music	Jose "Toto" Gentica V	Won
1982	Gawad Urian Awards	Best Sound	Ramon Reyes	Won
1982	Gawad Urian Awards	Best Actor	Joel Torre	Nominated
1982	Gawad Urian Awards	Best Supporting Actor	Ronnie Lazaro	Nominated
1982	Gawad Urian Awards	Best Supporting Actor	Manny Ojeda	Nominated
1982	Gawad Urian Awards	Best Supporting Actress	Liza Lorena	Nominated
1982	Gawad Urian Awards	Best Supporting Actress	Mitch Valdez	Nominated
1982	Gawad Urian Awards	Best Screenplay	Jose Javier Reyes	Nominated
1982	Gawad Urian Awards	Best Editing	Jesus Navarro	Nominated
1983	Chicago International Film Festival	Best Feature Film	Oro, Plata, Mata	Nominated
1983	Luna Awards	Best Supporting Actress	Liza Lorena	Won
1983	Luna Awards	Best Production Design	Don Escudero and Rodell Cruz	Won
