= Ronnie Lazaro =

Filipino actor

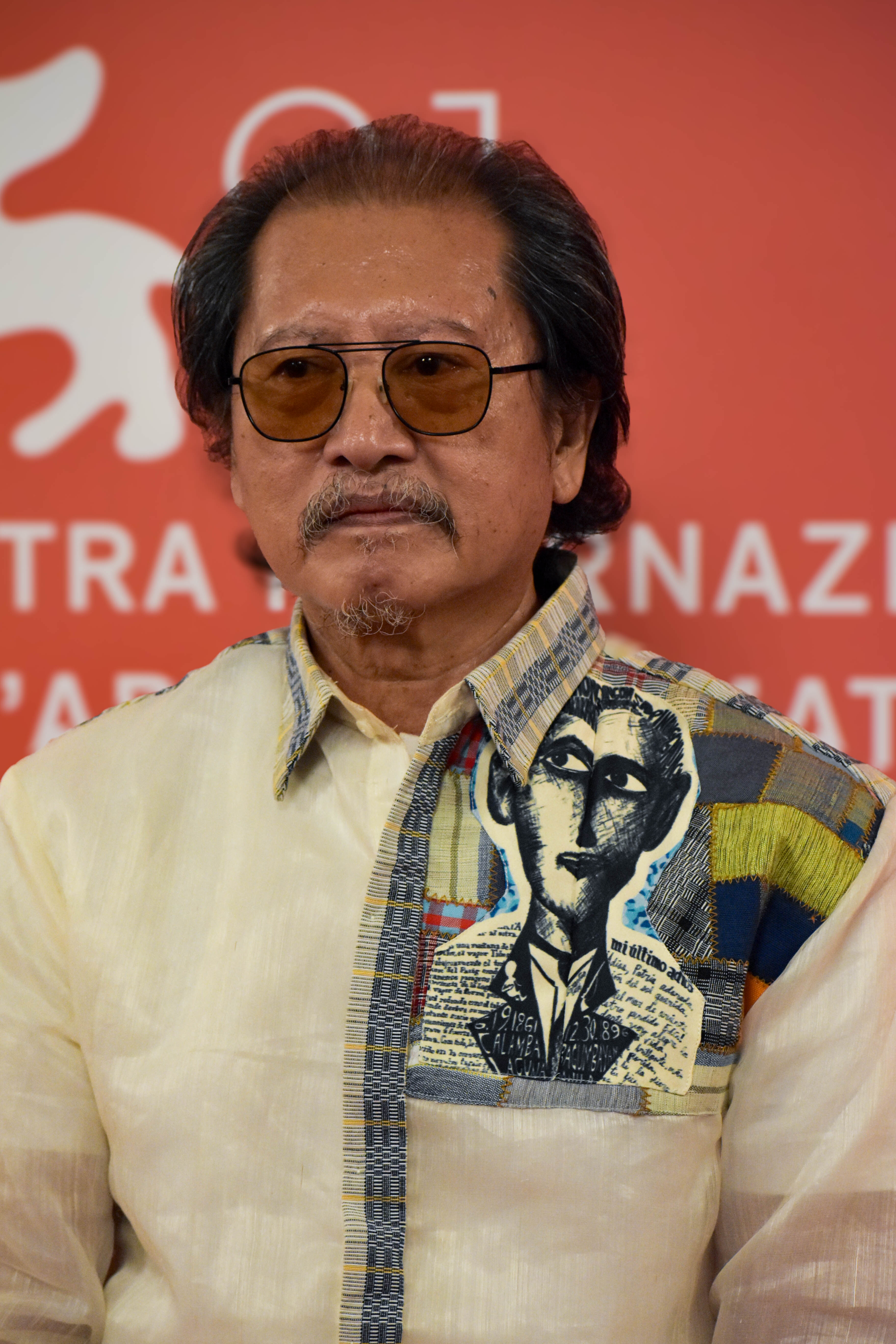
- Lazaro at the 81st Venice International Film Festival in 2024
- Born: Ronnie Zabala Lazaro; November 14, 1957 (age 68); Sagay, Negros Occidental, Philippines
- Occupations: Actor, producer, casting director
- Years active: 1977–present

Ronnie Zabala Lazaro (born November 14, 1957) is a Filipino film and television actor, producer, casting director, and art director. He won the Gawad Urian for Best Actor for Yanggaw (English title: Affliction; 2008).

== Biography ==
He has received many nominations throughout his career as an actor, nine of which were for Best Supporting Actor, and two for Best Actor (Ebolusyon in 2005 and Boatman in 1984). His films received recognition not only in the Philippines but also in international film festivals such as Cannes, Berlin and Hong Kong. He is currently working on a saga, Heremias, with Filipino director Lav Diaz, the first part of which has been shown for exhibition in the 23rd Turin Film Festival. He has also performed in several foreign projects filmed both in the Philippines and abroad.

Lazaro is also active in television and has appeared in various soap operas, such as Kamada, winner of the Dove Awards in 1997, and Anna Luna, where he was nominated for Best Supporting Actor in 1990.

Lazaro was born in Sagay City, Negros Occidental. His roots are in theatre: He co-directed an improvisational play entitled Pugakhang in 1979, and has toured nationwide to stage several plays including Hiblang Abo, which he co-produced.

Aside from his work as a film, theatre and television actor, Lazaro has had his share of achievements behind the camera. His art direction in Manila by Night won the Best Production Design Award in 1981. A self-taught photographer, he also launched in January 2005 a photo exhibit in the Museo de la Cárcel Real in Cáceres, Spain entitled Manila en las palmas de la luz (Manila in the palms of light), which ran for two months. The same exhibit was again mounted in October 2006 in Museo Perez Commendador–Leroux, coinciding with the 20th anniversary of the said museum.

The Gawad Urian Awards named Lazaro Best Actor in 2009 for his portrayal of a troubled father in the movie Yanggaw (English title: Affliction). He clinched two nominations from this same award-giving body in 2012: he was nominated as Best Actor for the film Boundary, and for Best Supporting Actor for Manila Kingpin: The Asiong Salonga Story.

Aside from his native Hiligaynon, Ronnie speaks Tagalog, English and a little Spanish.

== Filmography ==
=== Film ===
Year	Title	Role	Ref
1977	The Captive Virgins	Hermes	
1978	Wake Up, Maruja	Vergel	
1982	Oro, Plata, Mata	Hermes Mercurio	
1984	Boatman	Felipe	
1984	Joyful Mystery	Jamin	
1984	Batuigas II: Pasukuin si Waway	Tosan	
1985	Bilang Na ang Oras Mo		
1985	Revenge for Justice	Younger Brother	
1986	Flesh Avenue		
1987	Sweet Revenge	Jimmy Lee	
1989	Harimao		
1989	Return from the River Kwai	Boonrod	
1990	Delta Force 2: The Colombian Connection	Quiquina's Husband	
1991	Ganti ng Api	Conrad	
1992	Narito ang Puso Ko		
1992	Bayani		
1994	Fortunes of War	Border Patrol Lieutenant	
1994	Massacre Files		
1994	Separada	Hector	
1994	Lipa "Arandia" Massacre: Lord, Deliver Us from Evil		
1995	Victim No. 1: Delia Maga (Jesus, Pray for Us!) – A Massacre in Singapore		
1995	Costales	Kidnapper	
1995	Closer to Home	Denied Applicant (scenes deleted)	
1996	Medrano		
1997	Ipaglaban Mo II: The Movie	Albert	
1997	Damong Ligaw	Andrés Bonifacio	
1997	Behind Enemy Lines	Airport Policeman	
1998	Sa Pusod ng Dagat	Berto	
1998	Curacha ang Babaeng Walang Pahinga	Scavenger	
1998	Jose Rizal	Don Francisco Mercado	
1999	Yesterday Children	Nonong	
	Brokedown Palace	Security	
	Naked Under the Moon		
	Flower of Manila	Ed's Father	

- 2000 Shadows (short) ... Photographer
- 2001 ID ... Rodel (pilay)
- 2001 Radio ... Peter
- 2001 New Moon ... Datu Ali
- 2002 Hesus, Rebolusyunaryo ... Miguel Reynante
- 2002 Utang ni Tatang ... Al
- 2002 Timeless ... Mirdo B. Orbida
- 2002 Au bout du rouleau (TV movie) Phan
- 2003 Bulong sa Kawalan
- 2004 Astigmatism ... Manong Gerry
- 2004 Evolution of a Filipino Family ... Fernando
- 2004 Panaghóy sa Subâ: The Call of the River ... Kuwanggol
- 2004 The Echo ... Caretaker
- 2005 Ang Anak ni Brocka
- 2005 Ilusyon ... Pablo
- 2005 Sandalang Bahay ... Mang Anong
- 2005 Boso ... Imbestigador 2
- 2005 Baryoke
- 2005 Lasponggols
- 2005 Miss Pinoy
- 2005 Maging Akin Muli (TV movie) ... Nonoy Cruz
- 2005 Shake, Rattle & Roll 2k5 ... Bulag (segment "Lihim ng San Joaquin")
- 2006 Green Rocking Chair
- 2006 Heremias (Unang Aklat: Ang Alamat ng Prinsesang Bayawak) ... Heremias
- 2007 M.O.N.A.Y (Misteyks Obda Neyson Adres Yata) ni Mr. Shooli
- 2007 Tukso
- 2007 Ataul for Rent (International title: Casket for Hire)
- 2008 Ploning
- 2008 Namets!
- 2008 Affliction
- 2008 Love Me Again
- 2008 Brutus
- 2009 Villa Estrella
- 2009 Manila Skies
- 2009 Pandemic
- 2009 Yanggaw
- 2010 Amigo
- 2010 Ishmael
- 2011 Manila Kingpin: The Asiong Salonga Story
- 2012 Ang Katiwala Kuya Gimo
- 2012 Pridyider
- 2012 Ang Mga Kidnapper ni Ronnie Lazaro
- 2012 Captured
- 2012 El Presidente General Candido Tirona
- 2015 Heneral Luna ... Lt. Garcia
- 2017 Tatlong Bibe
- 2018 Goyo: Ang Batang Heneral ... Lt. Garcia
- 2019 Maria ... Greg
- 2021 Gensan Punch
- 2022 When the Waves Are Gone
- 2023 In My Mother's Skin
- 2023 GomBurZa ... Francisco Rizal Mercado
- 2024 40
- 2024 Phantosmia
- 2024 Green Bones ... Edgardo "Gardo" Sevilla
- 2025 Lola Barang
- 2025 Magellan ... Rajah Humabon

=== Television ===
Year	Title	Role
1985	Champoy	Himself
1989	Anna Luna	Pinong
1996	Bayani	Apolinario Mabini
1997	Esperanza	Duarte Maranan
1998	Bayani	Macli-ing Dulag
2003	A LEGACY OF HEROES: The Story of Bataan and Corregidor	Jose Calugas
2004	Krystala	Joram
2006	Calla Lilly	Apo Abdon
2006	Love Spell Presents: Charm & Crystal	
2006	Komiks Presents: Da Adventures of Pedro Penduko	
2006	Atlantika	Roman
2007	Rounin	Mang Elli
2007	Mga Kuwento ni Lola Basyang: Si Pedrong Walang Takot	
2007	Sineserye Presents: Natutulog Ba ang Diyos?	Bernardo Ramirez
2008	Eva Fonda	Ben
2009	Carlo J. Caparas' Totoy Bato	Podong Magtanggol
2009	Nagsimula sa Puso	Mario Bernardo
2010	Sine Novela: Gumapang Ka sa Lusak	Falcon
2010	Agimat: Ang Mga Alamat ni Ramon Revilla: Elias Paniki	Victor
2010	Wansapanataym: Super Kikay and her Flying Pagong	Jorge
2011	Minsan Lang Kita Iibigin	Julian "Diego" Pamintuan
2011	Maalaala Mo Kaya: Medalyon	Papa
2011	Wansapanataym: Darmo Adarna	Darako
2012	Kung Ako'y Iiwan Mo	Cito
2013	Indio	Waray Lupig
2013	Bukas na Lang Kita Mamahalin	Benjie
2014	Ikaw Lamang	Pacquito Roque
2015	Pangako Sa 'Yo	Francisco "Isko" Macaspac
2016	My Super D	Dado Aguilar
2016	Someone to Watch Over Me	Ruben "Estoy" Mercado
2017	FPJ's Ang Probinsyano	Romano "Chairman" Recio
2017	The Good Son	Matias Reyes
2018–2020	Kadenang Ginto	Nicolas "Kulas" Bartolome
2019	Maalaala Mo Kaya: Flyers	Jacinto
2020–2021	Walang Hanggang Paalam	Nick Salvador
2022	The Broken Marriage Vow	Jose Alindayao
2022	Suntok sa Buwan	Mr. Seng
2022	Big Bet	Carlos
2022	The Iron Heart	Oak Mateo
2023	AraBella	Hadji
2023–2025	FPJ's Batang Quiapo	Lucio Liberan
2023–2024	Can't Buy Me Love	Abalos "Balong" Pelonio
2024	Sellblock	
2026	My Bespren Emman	Luciano "Cianong/E.M.P." Palacio

=== Producer ===
- 2005: Sandalang Bahay (associate producer)
- 2009: Ang Beerhouse (associate producer)

=== Casting director ===
- 2010 Amigo

=== Art director ===
- 1980 City After Dark

=== Theatre ===
- Bakeretta (Ghost Operetta) by Chong Wishing, translated by Liza Magtoto, Cultural Center of the Philippines (CCP).
- Mass by F. Sionil Jose. Directed by Cris Millado, adaptation by Rody Vera. CCP.
- Oraciones by Rene Villanueva, Rody Vera, Nick Pichay and Liza Magtoto, directed by Jose Estrella. CCP.
- Pinoy Agonistes by Nick Joaquin, directed by Nonon Padilla. CCP.
- Hiblang Abo by Rene Villanueva, directed by Spanky Manikan and Pen Medina.
- Piglas by Mikhail Bulgakov, translated by Onie de Leon. Directed by Nonon Padilla. CCP.
- Ulo ni Pancho Villa by Dennis Marasigan, CCP.
- Tatlong Parusa, Isang Sentensiya by Pedro Calderon de la Barca, translated by J.B. Capino. Directed by Nonon Padilla. CCP.
- Neo Filipino (Dance Poetry), directed by Denissa Reyes and Agnes Locsin. CCP.
- Ang Propeta (Musical), written and directed by Paulo Mercado. Music Museum.
- Ibon sa Lawa by Anton Chekov, translated by Jose Maria Matute. Directed by Nonon Padilla. CCP.
- And St. Louis Loves Dem Pilipinos by Floy Quintos, directed by Tony Mabesa. University of the Philippines.
- Katipunan by Boni Ilagan, directed by Tony Espejo. Philippine International Convention Center.
- Kanser by Jomar Fleras, directed by Jun Pablo and Tony Espejo.
- Lorenzo Ruiz (1989), directed by Tony Espejo.
- Martir de Golgota, directed by Lou Veloso. Sta. Ana, Makati.
- Ang Munting Prinsipe, adaptation of The Little Prince by Antoine de Saint-Exupéry. Directed by Tony Espejo. Metropolitan Theater.
- Bien Aliktad, directed by Joel Lamangan. CCP.
- Sino Ba Kayo?, directed by Armand Sta. Ana. Intramuros.
- Kuwentong Katawa-tawa, adaptation of a work by Armand Salacrou. Directed by Ray Ventura. Philam Life Theater.
- Esprit de Corps, directed by Susan Ceneza. CCP.
- Inspired Madness (Dance), directed by Peque Gallaga. CCP.
- Sa Kaluoy Sang Diyos (Skin of our Teeth), directed by Peque Gallaga. St. Scholastica's College Manila.
- Pugakhang, directed by Peque Gallaga and Ronnie Lazaro. University of St. La Salle, formerly La Salle College, Bacolod.
- Ang Manugpatigayon, directed by Peque Gallaga. University of St. La Salle.
- A Funny Thing Happened on the Way to the Forum, directed by Peque Gallaga. University of St. La Salle.
- The King and I, adaptation of the classical Rodgers and Hammerstein play. Directed by Peque Gallaga. University of St. La Salle.
- Ang Baylarina (An Ilonggo Adaptation), directed by Manny Julian. University of St. La Salle.

== Awards and nominations ==
Year	Organization	Category	Result	Source
1983	Gawad Urian	Best Supporting Actor (for Oro, Plata, Mata, 1982)	Nominated	
1985	Gawad Urian	Best Actor (for Boatman, 1984)	Nominated	
2001	Metro Manila Film Festival	Best Supporting Actor (for Bagong Buwan)	Won	
2005	Gawad Urian	Best Actor (for Evolution of a Filipino Family, 2004)	Nominated	
2005	FAP Awards, Philippines	Best Supporting Actor (for Panaghóy sa subâ: The Call of the River, 2004)	Nominated	
2008	FAP Awards, Philippines	Best Supporting Actor (for Casket for Hire, 2007)	Nominated	
2009	Gawad Urian	Best Actor (for Affliction, 2008)	Won	
2024	Gawad Urian	Best Supporting Actor (for The Gospel of the Beast, 2023)	Won	
