= Teatro Pilipino =

Resident drama company

Teatro Pilipino was a resident drama company of the Cultural Center of the Philippines (CCP) from 1976 to 1987. It was founded by Filipino playwright, translator, director, and educator Rolando S. Tinio, who also served as its Artistic.

The company was dedicated to producing world classics in translation as well as notable Filipino plays, as it aimed to promote cultural development and support of the Filipino language through theater.

Teatro Pilipino popularized a number of classic masterpieces among Filipino audiences by translating them into Filipino. Tinio believed that by presenting these works in translation, he was translating the philosophies and ideologies behind those plays as well.

After a 1975 pilot season of two plays sponsored by the Department of Public Information and the Cultural Center of the Philippines, the company was formally introduced as one of two resident drama companies of the CCP. After a change in government in 1986, the new CCP Management decided to abandon the drama companies, forcing Teatro Pilipino to move to a new home at the old Metropolitan Theater (MET) at Lawton, near Downtown Manila.

After the death of its principal actor, Dame Ella Luansing-Tinio in 1991, the curtain fell for the last time, after a performance of Shakespeare's Twelfth Night (Ikalabing-Dalawang Gabi). The play was produced as a showcase for Unang Tagpo (National Theater Festival).

Teatro Pilipino held annual summer workshops on acting, directing and stage management.

== Notable productions ==
- Bienvenido "Boy" Noriega's Bayan-Bayanan (1975)
- Uncle Vanya (1976)
- Alexei Arbusov’s The Promise (1976)
- La Traviata (1976)
- St. Joan (1977)
- Hedda Gabler (1977)
- Glass Menagerie (1979)
- Hamlet (1979)
- Caligula (1981)
- Romeo and Juliet (1981)
- Antigone (1982)
- The Seagull (1982)
- Ugo Betti’s The Queen and the Rebels (1983)
- The Good Woman of Setzuan (1983)
- Medea (1988)
- Macbeth (1989)

Plays by Filipino playwrights staged by Teatro include Francisco Baltazar’s Orosman at Zafira (Orosman and Zafira), 1977; and those written by Tinio himself, such as May Katwiran ang Katwiran (Reason Has Its Reason), 1981, 1989; and Ang Babae sa Panitik (Women in Literature), 1991.

== Artists ==
- Ella Luansing
- Ding Navasero
- Nestor U. Torre
- Tony Mabesa
- Aurelio Estanislao
- Ernie Garcia
- Celeste Legaspi
- Freddie Santos
- Tommy Abuel
- Edgar Oira
- Rey Malte-Cruz
- Divina Cavestany
- Marcelino Cavestany
- Nomer Son
- Naty-Crame Rogers
- Adul de Leon
- Rustica Carpio
- Amable Quiambao
- Frankie Aseniero
- Angie Ferro
- Nanding Josef
- Chriss Michelena
- Tess-Dumpit
- Tony Espejo
- Manny Balane
- Victoria Tinio
- Gerson Mangune
- Emmie V. Abadilla
- Babsy Paredes
- Ihman Esturc
- Kevin Delgado
- Delan Robillos
- Edmundo Farolan

== See also ==
- Tanghalang Pilipino
