= Ang Probinsyano (disambiguation) =

Ang Probinsyano is a Philippine television drama action series broadcast by ABS-CBN and Kapamilya Channel from 2015 to 2022. It may also refer to:

- Ang Probinsyano (film), a 1996 Filipino action film
- Ang Probinsyano Party-list, political party in the Philippines
