= Jaime Fabregas =

Filipino actor (born 1950)

Jaime Fábregas
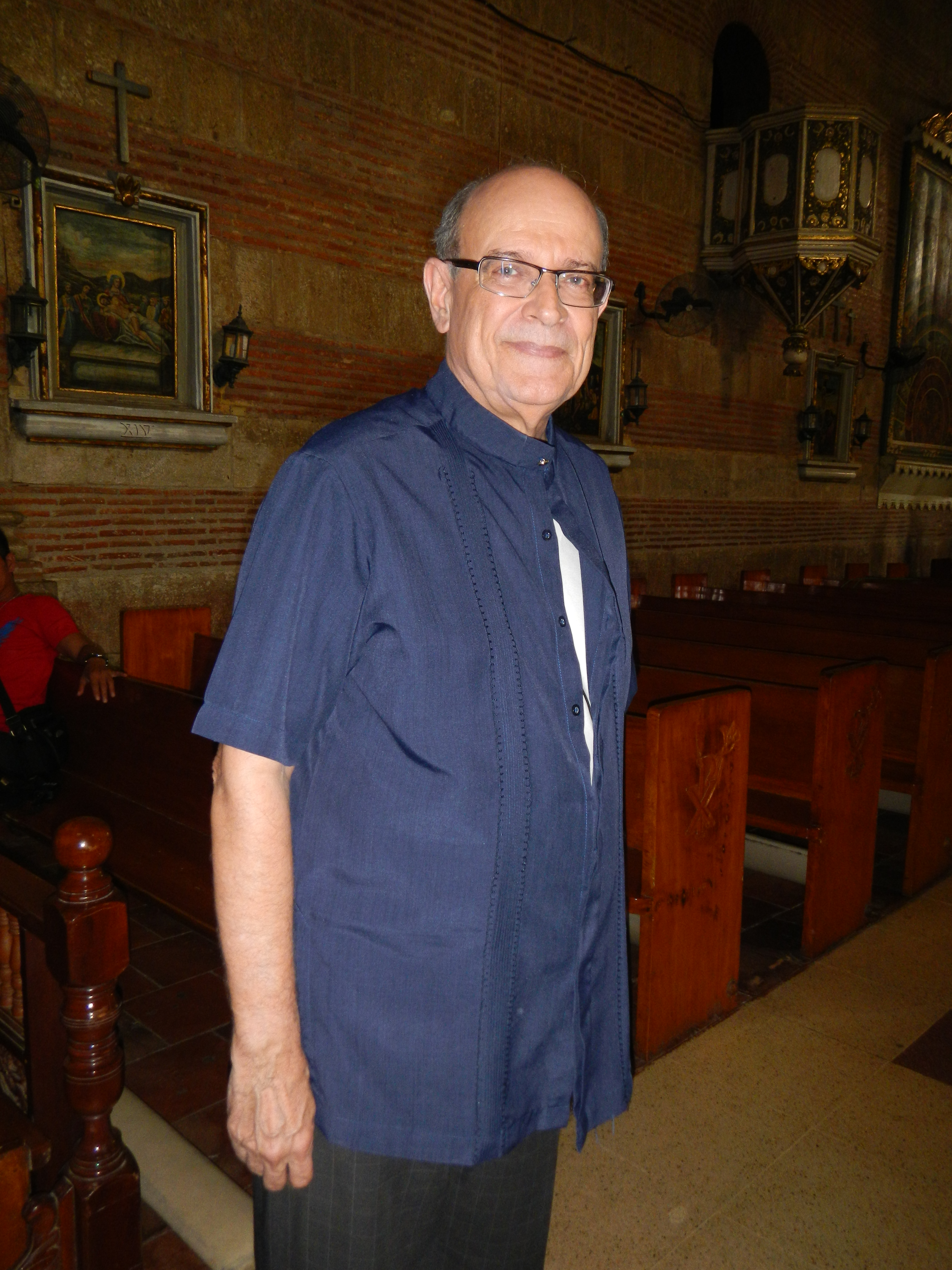
- Fábregas in 2013 at the Pakil Church while shooting My Little Juan
- Born: Jaime Francisco García Fábregas; February 28, 1950 (age 76); Iriga, Camarines Sur, Philippines
- Occupations: Actor, composer
- Years active: 1974–present
- Height: 173 cm (5 ft 8 in)
- Spouse(s): Maria Leticia Caballero (annulled); Consuelo Tordesillas
- Children: 7 (incl. Lara)
- Parent(s): Pedro Miguel Fábregas; Isabel García

Jaime Francisco García Fábregas (Tagalog: [ˈhajme ˈpabrɛgas]; born February 28, 1950) is a Filipino actor and composer.

== Early life ==
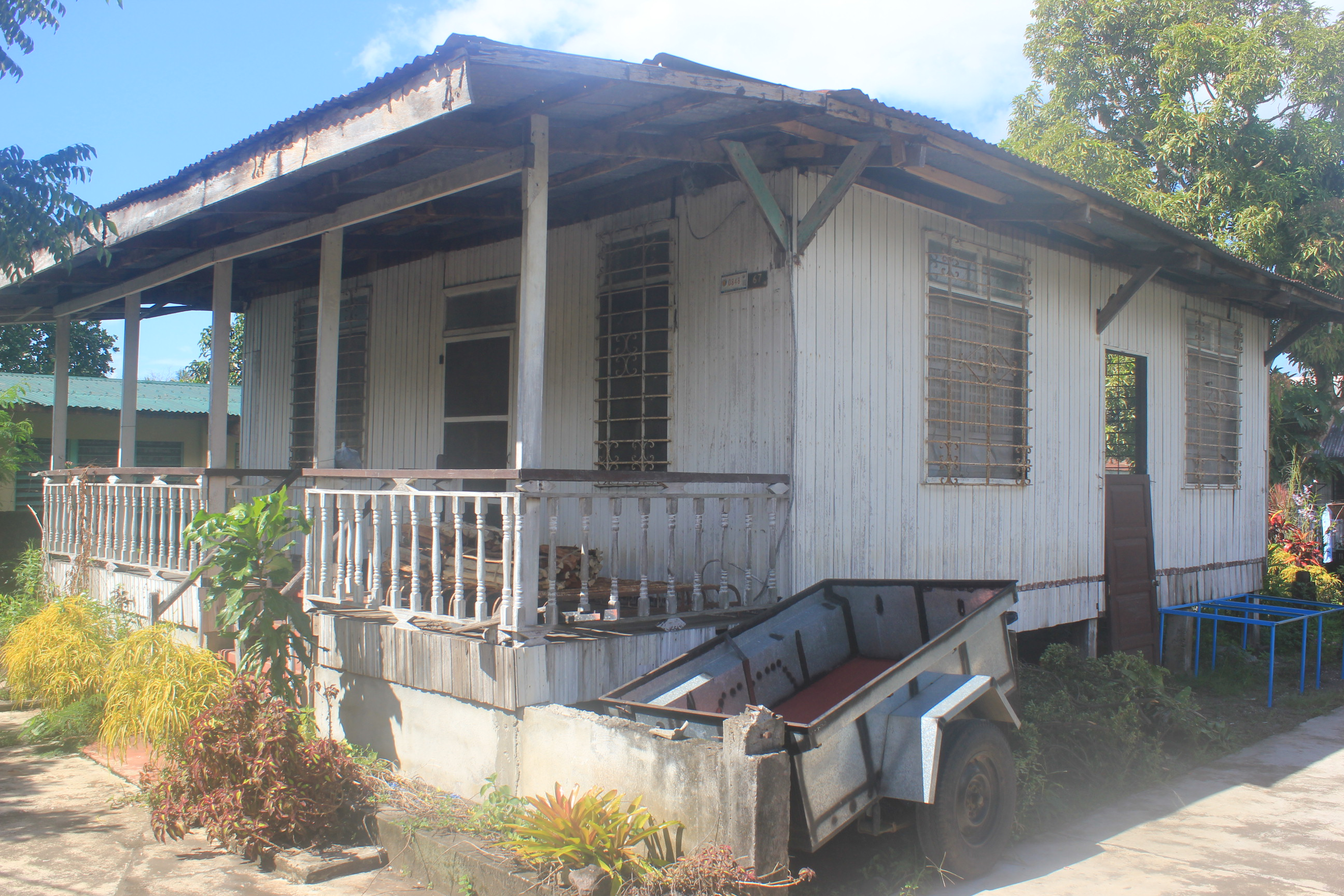
Fabregas' ancestral house in San Nicolas, Iriga City

Jaime Francisco García Fábregas was born in Iriga City, Camarines Sur, Philippines to his parents Pedro Fábregas and Isabel García.

== Career ==
Fábregas began his acting career in theatre before entering show business. He became a part of Repertory Philippines where he acted in many plays and musicals.

Fábregas is a former host of the gag show Sic O'Clock News (IBC 13). He is also a former wrestling segment reporter of Pinoy Wrestling (PTV 4), where he was dubbed the local version of WWE reporter Mean Gene Okerlund.

He is also a musical scorer, having won awards for his works in films. Shake, Rattle & Roll, which was screened at the 1984 Metro Manila Film Festival (MMFF), was the recipient of the Best Music accolade, a film which he did the musical score for. He also did the musical score for Rizal sa Dapitan and Kutob, which were screened at the 1997 and 2005 MMFF, respectively. Both films were given the Best Musical Score award.

Fábregas is best known for his role as Lt. General Delfin S. Borja in the ABS-CBN action-drama series FPJ's Ang Probinsyano, starring Coco Martin. Behind the scenes, he is also the musical director for the show.

== Personal life ==
Fábregas was married to his first wife, Leticia Caballero, with whom he has three children. The couple later annulled. His children with Caballero were former actors – Lara Fábregas, Paolo Fábregas and Minco Fábregas.

He later married his second wife Ma. Consuelo Tordesillas, with whom he has four children. Two of his sons with Tordesillas are musicians – Emilio Fábregas (guitarist of the Filipino band Bonsai! Bonsai!) and Leandro Fábregas (bassist of the Filipino band Rusty Machines).

In addition to his seven children, Fábregas also has twelve grandchildren.

== Filmography ==
=== Film ===
Year	Title	Role
1976	Ganito Kami Noon, Paano Kayo Ngayon?	Comandante
1981	Wild	
1982	Oro, Plata, Mata	Minggoy
1983	Bad Bananas sa Puting Tabing	Lastico
1984	Working Girls	board member
1985	Paradise Inn	
1985	Isa-Isa Lang!	Mr.Ramos
1985	Sex Object	
1986	Iyo ang Tondo, Kanya ang Cavite	Felix
1986	Super Islaw and the Flying Kids	Padre Jaime
1986	Muslim .357	Jimmy
1986	Halimaw	
1986	Tuklaw	Don Osmundo
1987	Tigershark	Vladimir
1987	Kamagong	Cenon Beltran
1987	Bunsong Kerubin	Satur
1987	Jack & Jill	Don Juanito Bartolome
1987	Takot Ako, Eh!	
1987	Kapag Puno Na ang Salop	Doctor
1987	Vigilante	Don Ramon Sanchez
1988	Taray at Teroy	Caloy
1988	Jockey T'yan	
1988	I Love You 3x a Day	Dean Jaime Cabunglaw
1988	Smith & Wesson	Mr. Ayala
1988	Kumander Anting-Anting	
1989	Eagle Squad	
1989	Wooly Booly: Ang Classmate Kong Alien	Mad scientist
1990	Sa Diyos Lang Ako Susuko	Mayor Jose Antero
1990	Nardong Toothpick	
1990	Dino Dinero	
1990	Twist: Ako si Ikaw, Ikaw si Tax	David
1990	May Isang Tsuper ng Taxi	Mr. Velarde
1990	Baril Ko ang Uusig	Moran
1991	Leon ng Maynila: P/Col. Romeo B. Maganto, WPD-MPFF	Mr. Velarde
1991	Mayor Latigo	Mayor Perez
1992	Jerry Marasigan, WPD	
1993	Dugo ng Panday	Gobernador
1993	Manchichiritchit	Don Andres
1993	Galvez: Hanggang sa Dulo ng Mundo Hahanapin Kita	Serante
1993	Magkasangga 2000	Prof. Duval
1994	Macario Durano	Editorial Chief
1994	Ismael Zacarias	Mr. Tanchoco
1994	Kanto Boy 2: Anak ni Totoy Guapo	Don Anselmo
1994	Si Ayala at si Zobel	Bank manager
1995	O-Ha! Ako Pa?	Yvette's father
1995	Sarah... Ang Munting Prinsesa	James
1995	Magic Kombat	Asst. Dean
1995	Ang Syota Kong Balikbayan	Don Facundo
1996	Lab en Kisses	Uncle John
1996	Batas Ko Ay Bala	Atty. Morales
1997	Halik ng Vampira	Dr. Hellgaarde
1997	Rizal sa Dapitan	Fr. Francisco Paula de Sanchez
1998	Nagbibinata	Arnold Velasco
1998	José Rizal	Luis Taviel de Andrade
1998	Puso ng Pasko	Baltazar Tiyo Balti
1999	Peque Gallaga's Scorpio Nights 2	Butch Beltran
1999	Ekis	Eliseo
2000	Fidel Jimenez, Magkasubukan Tayo	
2000	Pedrong Palad	Nick Deocampo
2000	Pag Oras Mo, Oras Mo Na	Señor Sanchez
2000	Ayos Na... ang Kasunod	Mr. Legaspi / The boss
2000	Ipinanganak Na ang Taong Papatay sa Iyo	Don Roque
2000	Laro sa Baga	
2001	Vital Parts	
2001	Abakada... Ina	
2001	Banyo Queen	
2001	Sanggano't 'Sanggago	
2002	Ang Agimat: Anting-anting ni Lolo	
2003	Spirit Warriors: The Shortcut	Sir Harry
2003	Ngayong Nandito Ka	Don Federico Rodriguez
2004	Astigmatism	Tatang
2005	D' Anothers	Fr. Florentino
2006	Eternity	Fr. Miguel
2010	Here Comes the Bride	Bien
2010	Rosario	Party Guest
2011	Ikaw ang Pag-ibig	
2011	A Mother's Story	Edgar
2012	Guni-Guni	Nanding
2012	I Do Bidoo Bidoo: Heto nAPO Sila!	Julio Fuentebella
2012	The Strangers	Pete
2013	Raketeros	
2013	When the Love Is Gone	Yuri's father
2014	Trophy Wife	
2015	Felix Manalo	Padre Mariano Borja
2016	Lumayo Ka Nga Sa Akin	Priest
2017	Extra Service	Don Jose Mondragon
2017	Ang Larawan	Don Aristeo Bernardo
2017	Carlo J. Caparas' Ang Panday	Andoy Batungbakal
2023	GomBurZa	Archbishop Gregorio Melitón Martínez
2023	Firefly	old Louie
2024	Stag	Lolo Enteng
2025	Kontrabida Academy	The Sponsor
2025	Everyone Knows Every Juan	Father Johnny
2026	A Special Memory	
2026	Young Blood	Val

=== Television ===
Year	Title	Role
1985	Lovingly Yours	Various
1987–1990	Sic O'Clock News	Sonny Esguerra
1988	A Dangerous Life	Ben Balamo
1989	Pinoy Wrestling	Segment Wrestling Reporter
1990	Boracay	
1991	Cebu	
1992	Toink: Hulog ng Langit	
1993	GMA Telesine Specials	
1993	VIVA Spotlight Drama Specials	
1993	ATM: Annette Tonyboy Maria	
1993	Noli Me Tangere	Alferez
1994	Tondominium	
1994	Modern Romance sa Telebisyon	
1995	Love Notes The Series	
1995	TGIS	
1995	Mikee	
1996	1896	
1996	Growing Up	
1997	Mikee Forever	
1997	Wansapanataym: "Daga"	Angeli and Pepot's father
1999	Maynila	
1999	Pwedeng Pwede	
2000	Maalaala Mo Kaya: "Wedding Cake"	
2000	GMA Drama Studio Presents	
2000	Super Klenk	
2001	Sa Dulo ng Walang Hanggan	Menandro Soriano
2001	Ikaw Lang ang Mamahalin	Roberto Zeñorosa
2001	Sana ay Ikaw na Nga	
2002	Magpakailanman	
2002	Wansapanataym: "Ang Pilyo at ang Pilya"	
2002	Wansapanataym: "Zorotsky"	Miguel
2002–2003	Habang Kapiling Ka	Fausto Bravo
2004	Te Amo, Maging Sino Ka Man	
2004	Sarah the Teen Princess	
2004	Wansapanataym: "Bottled Genie"	Head genie
2004	Wansapanataym: "Palakokak"	Haring Kekok
2005	Hokus Pokus	Various
2005	Ang Mahiwagang Baul	Various
2005	Kampanerang Kuba	Don Francisco Saavedra
2006	Majika	Aduro
2007	Camera Café	Boss Ric
2007	Asian Treasures	Pio Roman Dalisay / Gomburza
2007	Mga Kuwento ni Lola Basyang: "Ang Mahiwagang Kuba"	Minister
2007	Marimar	Don Augusto Aldama
2007	Pangarap Na Bituin	Louie Salcedo
2007	Princess Sarah	Monsieur Dufarge
2008	Iisa Pa Lamang	Enrique Torralba
2008	Maalaala Mo Kaya: "Isda"	Maning
2009–2010	May Bukas Pa	Fr. Anthony Ruiz
2010	Claudine	Various
2010	Imortal	Abraham Villamor
2011	Maalaala Mo Kaya: "Birth Certificate"	Fred
2011	Iglot	Dr. Hugo Petrovsky
2011	Wansapanataym: "My Gulay"	Islaw
2011	Ikaw ay Pag-Ibig	Judge Jonathan Lacerna
2011	Mars Ravelo's Captain Barbell	President
2012	Wansapanataym: "Ang Monito ni Monika"	Domeng
2012	E-Boy	Alfredo Villareal
2012	A Beautiful Affair	Arturo Pierro
2013	Wansapanataym: "Hungry Games"	Lolo
2013	Juan Dela Cruz	Fr. Ramoncito "Cito" Gonzales
2013	My Little Juan	Fr. Ramoncito "Cito" Gonzales
2014	Wansapanataym: "Enchanted House"	Grandpa
2014	The Legal Wife	Leo Zapanta
2014	Mars Ravelo's Dyesebel	Haring Aurelio
2014	Ang Dalawang Mrs. Real	Juan Antonio 'Jun' Real Jr.
2014	Vampire ang Daddy Ko	Albularyo, Sir Jimmy
2015	Pari 'Koy	Bishop Hilario Baltazar
2015	All of Me	Vicente Avila
2015–2022	FPJ's Ang Probinsyano	Lt. Gen. Delfin S. Borja
2018	Barangay 143	Coach Caloy (Voice Only)
2023	Almost Paradise	Fr. Christo
2023	Linlang	Badong
2024	FPJ's Batang Quiapo	Señor Facundo Caballero†
2026	Never Say Die	
2026	Blood vs Duty	Datu Rahman Abubakar

=== As composer ===
Year	Title	Notes
1984	Misteryo sa Tuwa	
1984	Shake, Rattle & Roll	Won for Best Music (MMFF)
1985	Virgin Forest	Won for Best Musical Score (FAP)
1985	Scorpio Nights	Won for Best Music (Gawad Urian)
1985	Boatman	
1985	Sex Object	
1986	Halimaw	Won for Best Musical Score (MMFF)
1987	No Retreat... No Surrender... Si Kumander	
1987	Vigilante	
1988	Ibulong Mo sa Diyos	
1988	Taray at Teroy	
1988	Super Inday and the Golden Bibe	
1988	Full Battle Gear	International title: The Expendables
1988	One Day, Isang Araw	
1988	Sheman: Mistress of the Universe	
1988	Sandakot Na Bala	
1988	I Love You 3x a Day	
1988	Smith & Wesson	
1988	Gawa Na ang Bala Na Papatay sa Iyo	
1988	Agila ng Maynila	
1989	Eagle Squad	
1989	Kung Kasalanan Man	
1989	Sa Kuko ng Agila	
1990	Kahit Konting Pagtingin	
1990	Alyas Pogi: Birador ng Nueva Ecija	
1990	Biktima	
1990	Kaaway ng Batas	
1991	Leon ng Maynila: P/Col. Romeo B. Maganto, WPD-MPFF	
1991	Maging Sino Ka Man	
1991	Sa Kabila ng Lahat	
1991	Batas ng .45	
1991	Hinukay Ko Na ang Libingan Mo	
1991	Uubusin Ko ang Lahi Mo	
1991	Manong Gang: Ang Kilabot at Maganda	
1991	Hepe ...Isasabay Kita sa Paglubog ng Araw!	
1991	Buburahin Kita sa Mundo	
1992	Grease Gun Gang	With Nonong Buencamino
1992	Dito sa Pitong Gatang	
1992	Aguila at Guerrero: Droga Terminators	
1992	Tag-araw, Tag-ulan	
1992	Magdaleno Orbos: Sa Kuko ng Mga Lawin	
1992	Narito ang Puso Ko	
1992	Lakay	
1993	Lethal Panther 2	Local version
1993	Magkasangga 2000	
1993	Doring Dorobo: Hagupit ng Batas	
1994	Deo Dador: Berdugo ng Munti	
1994	Vampira	
1994	Epimaco Velasco: NBI	
1994	Kanto Boy 2: Anak ni Totoy Guapo	Won for Best Musical Score (MMFF)
1995	Eskapo	
1995	Run Barbi Run	
1995	Ang Syota Kong Balikbayan	
1996	Itataya Ko ang Buhay Ko	
1996	Mumbaki	
1996	Lab en Kisses	
1996	'Wag Na 'Wag Kang Lalayo	
1996	Ang Probinsyano	
1997	Eseng ng Tondo	
1997	Batas Militar	Television documentary
1998	Pagbabalik ng Probinsyano	
1998	Sige, Subukan Mo	
1998	Hiling	
1999	Peque Gallaga's Scorpio Nights 2	
1999	Katawan	
1999	Wansapanataym	
1999	Isusumbong Kita sa Tatay Ko...	
1999	Alyas Pogi: Ang Pagbabalik	
1999	Bayolente	
2000	Ang Dalubhasa	
2000	Mahal Kita, Walang Iwanan	
2000	Senswal: Bakit Masarap ang Bawal?	
2000	Madame X	
2000	Ika-13 Kapitulo	
2000	Ipinanganak Na ang Taong Papatay sa Iyo	
2001	Syota ng Bayan	
2001	Tabi Tabi Po	
2001	The Virgin Wife	
2001	Tusong Twosome	
2001	Abakada... Ina	
2001	Carta Alas... Huwag Ka Nang Humirit	
2001	Banyo Queen	
2001	Mano Mano 2: Ubusan ng Lakas	
2001	Weyt a Minit, Kapeng Mainit	
2002	Batas ng Lansangan	
2002	Ang Alamat ng Lawin	
2003	Bayarán	
2003	Pakners	
2003	Bertud ng Putik	
2003	Masamang Ugat	
2005	Kutob	Won for Best Musical Score (MMFF)

== Awards and nominations ==
Year	Result	Category	Award	Film
1984	Won	Best Music	Metro Manila Film Festival	Shake, Rattle & Roll
1985	Nominated	Best Music	Gawad Urian Award	Misteryo sa Tuwa
1985	Nominated	Best Music	Gawad Urian Award	Boatman
1986	Nominated	Best Music	Gawad Urian Award	Virgin Forest
1986	Won	Best Music	Gawad Urian Award	Scorpio Nights
1986	Won	Best Musical Score	FAP Award	Virgin Forest
1986	Won	Best Music	Metro Manila Film Festival	Halimaw
1987	Nominated	Best Music	Gawad Urian Award	Private Show
1988	Won	Best Musical Score	FAP Award	Tagos ng Dugo
1989	Nominated	Best Music	FAMAS Award	Ibulong Mo sa Diyos
1990	Nominated	Best Music	Gawad Urian Award	Ang Pumatay ng Dahil sa Iyo
1990	Nominated	Best Music	Gawad Urian Award	Joe Pring: Homicide Manila Police
1991	Won	Best Music	Gawad Urian Award	My Other Woman
1992	Nominated	Best Achievement in Sound	YCC Award	Sa Kabila ng Lahat
1992	Won	Best Music	Gawad Urian Award	Sa Kabila ng Lahat
1993	Nominated	Best Achievement in Sound	YCC Award	Tag-araw, Tag-ulan
1993	Won	Best Music	Gawad Urian Award	Narito ang Puso Ko
1995	Nominated	Best Achievement in Sound	YCC Award	Vampira
1995	Nominated	Best Achievement in Sound	YCC Award	Waiting
1995	Nominated	Best Music	Gawad Urian Award	Waiting
1996	Nominated	Best Achievement in Sound	YCC Award	Sa Ngalan ng Pag-ibig
1997	Won	Best Achievement in Sound	YCC Award	Mumbaki
1997	Won	Best Musical Score	FAMAS Award	Mumbaki
1997	Won	Best Musical Score	Metro Manila Film Festival	Rizal sa Dapitan
1998	Won	Best Supporting Actor	Metro Manila Film Festival	Jose Rizal
1999	Won	Best Achievement in Sound	YCC Award	Curacha: Ang Babaeng Walang Pahinga
1999	Won	Best Supporting Actor	Star Awards	Jose Rizal
1999	Won	Best Supporting Actor	Gawad Urian Award	Jose Rizal
1999	Won	Best Supporting Actor	FAMAS Award	Jose Rizal
2002	Nominated	Best Musical Score	FAMAS Award	Abakada... Ina
2005	Won	Best Musical Score	Metro Manila Film Festival	Kutob
2011	Nominated	Best Performance by an Actor in a Leading Role	Golden Screen Award	Here Comes the Bride
2011	Nominated	Best Supporting Actor	FAMAS Award	Here Comes the Bride
