= Ray Ventura (actor) =

Filipino actor (1944–2001)

- Born: January 3, 1944
- Died: October 24, 2001 (aged 57)
- Occupation: Actor
- Years active: 1960s–2000

Ray Ventura (January 3, 1944 – October 24, 2001) was a Filipino character actor.

He died on October 24, 2001 following a surgery at University of the East Ramon Magsaysay Memorial Medical Center. But three days after operation, his condition worsened and his skin became yellowish and returned to confinement. Due to high cost of treatments, some of his former colleagues volunteered for the payment, and notable of them was Edu Manzano.

== Acting credits ==
- Evolution of a Filipino Family (2004) as Ka Harim (as Rey Ventura) {last movie appearance}
- Maalaala Mo Kaya (1991–2001 TV Anthology Series, 26 episodes)
- Sa iyong mga haplos (2001) as Mang Mulong
- Syota ng bayan (2001) as Tandang Ponso
- Kakabakaba (2000, TV Series 1 episode)
- Kagat ng dilim (2000, TV Series) as Tatay (1 episode)
- Ping Lacson: Super Cop (2000) as Colonel Rolando Abadilla
- Deathrow (2000) as Mio
- Kailangan ko'y ikaw (2000) as Tatay
- Ipinanganak na ang taong papatay sa iyo (2000) as Ruben
- Saranggani (2000) as Nelson
- Col. Elmer Jamias: Barako ng Maynila (2000) as SPO2 Raquedan
- Saan ka man naroroon (1999–2001, TV Series) as Mang Tino
- Still Lives (1999) as Salvador
- Sutla (1999) as Mang Antonio
- Alyas Pogi: Ang pagbabalik (1999) as Mang Ben Acosta
- Gimik: The Reunion (1999) Mr. Suntay
- Kahapon, may dalawang bata (1999) as Encio
- Sidhi (1999) as Badong
- Uod sa laman (1998) as Estong
- Kiss the Sky (1998) as Mateo Brother #1
- Miguel/Michelle (1998) as Nano
- Birador (1998) as Ben Ramas
- Ama namin (1998) as Msgr. Reyes
- Strebel: Gestapo ng Maynila (1998) as Maj. Gaspar (as Rey Ventura)
- Anting-anting (1998)
- Siya'y nagdadalaga (1997) as Ninong Miguel
- Calvento Files: The Movie (1997) as Joaquin (segment "Balintuwad")
- Ipaglaban mo II: The Movie (1997) as Prosecutor (episode 1)
- The Sarah Balabagan Story (1997) as Lawyer
- Bayad puri (1997) as Greta
- Flames: The Movie (1997) as Tito Rodel (segment "Tameme")
- NBI: The Mariano Mison Story (1997) as Senator
- Angel de Jesus (1997) as Mang Manuel
- Mahiwaga (1996, TV Movie)
- Tolentino (1996)
- Tapatan ng tapang (1996)
- Evangeline katorse (1996) as Direk
- Bakit may kahapon pa? (1996) as Col. Madrigal
- Lahar (1996) as Mang Gusting (as Rey Ventura)
- Mumbaki (1996) as Apo Ginoldang
- Kung alam mo lang (1996) as Miguel
- Leon Cordero (1996) as Turing (as Ray 'Raven' Ventura)
- Cara y Cruz: Walang sinasanto! (1996) as Provincial Police Chief
- Ang pinakamagandang hayop sa balat ng lupa (1996) as Tata Indo (as Rey Ventura)
- Judge Max Asuncion: Hukom bitay (1995) as Lawyer (as Rey Ventura)
- Escobar: Walang sasantuhin (1995) as General Camus
- Nena (1995) as Fiscal
- Rage (1995) as NBI Chief
- Kakaibang karisma (1995) as Kanor (as Ray 'Raven' Ventura)
- Closer to Home (1995) as Lacaba
- Ibigay mo ng todong-todo (1995)
- Sambahin mo ang katawan ko (1995)
- The Flor Contemplacion Story (1995) as Dan Vizmanos (as Rey Ventura)
- Costales (1995) as Col. Sixto
- Eskapo (1995) as The General
- Alfredo Lim: Batas ng Maynila (1995) as Espiridion Laxa (as Rey Ventura)
- Lucas Abelardo (1994) as Judge (as Rey Ventura)
- Vampira (1994) as Hepe
- Ka Hector as President Fidel V. Ramos
- Midnight Dancers (1994) as Gregorio (as Rey Ventura)
- Sakay (1993) as Gen. Cornelio Felizardo
- Sa isang sulok ng mga pangarap (1993) as Paking
- Leonardo Delos Reyes: Alyas Waway (1993) as Mang Selmo (as Rey Ventura)
- Dino... Abangan ang susunod na... (1993)
- Live by the Fist (1993) as Father Zamora
- Noli me tangere (1993, TV Series) as Sakristan Mayor (3 episodes)
- Pita: Terror ng Kaloocan (1993) as Pita's Father
- Sana'y ikaw na nga (1993) as Maeng
- Stella Magtanggol (1992)
- Andres Manambit: Angkan ng matatapang (1992) as Mayor
- Patayin si Billy Zapanta (1992) as Pastor
- Apoy sa puso (1992)
- Jesus dela Cruz at ang mga batang riles (1992) as Attorney Sibal
- Narito ang puso ko (1992) as Police (uncredited)
- Hiram na mukha (1992) as Delfin
- Tayong dalawa (1992) as Board Member
- Sana kahit minsan (1992)
- Yakapin mo akong muli (1992)
- Darna (1991)
- Angelito San Miguel at ang mga batang city jail (1991) as Attorney
- Kailan Ka Magiging Akin (1991) as Adul's Lawyer
- Bago matapos ang lahat (1991)
- When Heaven Judges (1990) as Emilio
- Tinikling or 'The Madonna and the Dragon' (1990) as Le prêtre
- Beautiful Girl (1990)
- Dirty Affair (1990) as Ricardo Tuazon
- Isang araw walang Diyos (1989) as Manong Kidlat
- Orapronobis (1989) as Refugee
- A Dangerous Life (1988) as Lt. Gen. 'Eddie' Ramos (TV Mini Series, 2 episodes)
- Tiyanak (1988) as Police
- Balweg (1987) as Ka Efren
- P.O.W. the Escape (1986) as NVA #2 in Empty Camp (as Rey Ventura)
- Hinugot sa langit (1985) as David
- Virgin Forest (1985) as Chua Tek (San Mateo)
- Misteryo sa Tuwa (1984) as (Santos)
- Broken Marriage (1983) Ronnie (as Rey Ventura)
- Moral (1982) as Taxi Driver (as Rey Ventura)
- Miracle (1982) as Bino
- Boystown (1981) as Ponso
