= Randy Santiago =

Filipino singer-songwriter (born 1960)

- Born: Randy Gerard Legaspi Santiago; November 26, 1960 (age 65)
- Origin: Manila, Philippines
- Genres: OPM; pop
- Occupations: Singer; songwriter; actor; producer; director; entrepreneur
- Years active: 1978–present

Randy Gerard Legaspi Santiago (born November 26, 1960) is a Filipino actor, comedian, television host, musician, director, producer and entrepreneur. He is the older brother of Raymart Santiago, Rowell Santiago and Reily Pablo L. Santiago Jr. He graduated from De La Salle University.

As an actor, Santiago has acted in movies such as Paikot-ikot, released in 1990, Pera o Bayong (Not da TV)! (2000), in which he portrayed Tiburcio, and Taray at Teroy (1988). As a film producer, he has produced movies such as "JR", released in 1983, and "Daniel Bartolo ng Sapang Bato" (1982).

== Personal life ==
Santiago is the brother of film/TV/stage director Rowell Santiago and actor Raymart Santiago, and the son of film director Pablo P. Santiago and actress Cielito Legaspi.

Santiago is rarely seen in public without sunglasses due to lazy eye. Santiago mentioned in an interview in Magandang Buhay that his eyelid condition was a result of a cyst on his left eyelid which first appeared when he was in second grade. In 2025, Santiago underwent cataract surgery.

Santiago is married to Marilou Coronel and has three children, one of whom, died from multiple sclerosis in 2017 aged 24.

== Other ventures ==
In addition to his acting career, he is also the owner of Ratsky Bar, a restaurant chain with branches throughout the Philippines and the Middle East.

== Filmography ==
=== Film ===
Year	Title	Character/Role
1987	No Retreat... No Surrender... Si Kumander	Einstein
1988	Taray at Teroy	Terry
1990	Paikot-ikot	Rocky
1990	Tiny Terrestrial: The Three Professors	Prof. Jason Eyestyle
1996	Wanted Perfect Mother	cameo appearance
1996	Ang Syota Kong Balikbayan	cameo appearance
2000	Pera o Bayong (Not da TV)!	Tiburcio
2002	Mano Po	Additional
2006	All About Love	Additional
2006	First Day High	Additional
2007	You Got Me!	Additional
2007	I've Fallen for You	Additional
2008	My Big Love	Additional
2009	You Changed My Life	Additional
2009	T2	Additional
2009	I Love You, Goodbye	Additional
2010	Here Comes the Bride	Additional
2010	Cinco	Additional
2010	Till My Heartaches End	Additional
2010	Dalaw	Additional
2012	My Cactus Heart	Additional
2012	Corazon: Ang Unang Aswang	Additional
2013	Kaleidoscope World	Additional
2013	Raketeros	Director
2014	Shake, Rattle & Roll XV	Additional

=== Television ===
Year	Title	Character/Role
1986–1993	Lunch Date	Host
1987	Shades	Host
1993–1995	SST: Salo-Salo Together	Host
1993–1995	Ober Da Bakod	Mike
1993–2000	Oki Doki Doc	Rabbit owner
1995–1998	'Sang Linggo nAPO Sila	Himself
1998–2003	Magandang Tanghali Bayan	Host
1998–present	ASAP	Occasional Performer
2002	Wansapanataym: Zorotsky	
2003–2004	Masayang Tanghali Bayan	Host
2004–2005	Star Circle Quest	Judge
2005–2006	My Juan and Only	Harry
2005	O-Ha!	Various
2005	Wag Kukurap	Various
2007–2009	Celebrity Duets: Philippine Edition	Himself
2007	Little Big Superstar	Judge
2008	Maynila	Various
2009	Talentadong Pinoy	Judge
2009	Showtime	Celebrity Guest Judge
2009	Show Me Da Manny	Various
2009	Are You the Next Big Star?	Judge
2010	Pepito Manaloto	Various
2010	Diva	George del Rosario
2011–2012	Happy, Yipee, Yehey	Himself/Main Host
2012	Toda Max	Baby Manoling
2012	Wansapanataym: Pinay's Big Sister	Daddy
2012	Lorenzo's Time	
2012	Sarap Diva	Guest
2013	Wowowillie	Host
2013	It's Showtime	Celebrity Guest Judge
2015	Celebrity Playtime	KomedyanTeam
2014	Tunay Na Buhay	Himself/Guest
2015	Sabado Badoo	Cameo Guest Footage
2016	Dear Uge	TBA
2017	La Luna Sangre	Noel "Doc" Domingo
2018–2021	It's Showtime	Himself/Tawag ng Tanghalan (season 3) hurado
2018	I Can See Your Voice	Himself/Occasional Guest Singvestigator
2021–2022; 2025–2026	Sing Galing!	Host
2022	Start-Up PH	Ernest
2024–2025	Wil To Win	Host

=== Television (as director/producer) ===
Year	Title
1994	Salo-Salo Together (SST)
2006	Aalog-Alog
2009	Parekoy
2015	Wowowin
2016	A1 Ko Sa 'Yo
2024–2025	Wil to Win

== Discography ==
=== Albums ===
- First (Sunshine Records, released on October 22, 1988)
- Scandal Eyes Live! (Sunshine Records, released on July 1, 1989)
- Siguro (Sunshine Records) (1989)
- Naglalambing (Viva Records, 1992)
- True Love (Alpha Music, 1995)
- Pakita Mo (Star Music, 2000)
- Beinte Na Hihirit Pa All Hits Live! (Vicor Music Corporation, 2006)

=== Songs ===
- "Hindi Magbabago"
- "Babaero" (1988)
- "Siguro"
- "Umiinit Umaapoy Lumiliyab"
- "Nais"
- "Naglalambing"
- "Pagod ng Puso"
- "'Di Ako Papayag"
- "Pobreng Manliligaw"
- "Tabi Tayo"
- "True Love"
- "Basta't Ika'y Maging Akin"
- "Huwag Kang Paloloko"
- "Senorita"
- "Ikaw Lamang, Wala Nang Iba"
- "Laman ng Kalsada"
- "Eto Na Naman" (Original By Gary V.)
- "Curtain of Your Heart"
- "I'll Sing to You"
- "Tayo Pa Rin"
- "Pakita Mo"
- "Nandiyan Na si Cardo" (2018)
- "Dance & Sing (Basta May Social Distancing)" (2020)

== Awards and recognition ==
- Celebrity Inductee Winner, 10th Eastwood City Walk Of Fame Philippines 2015
