= Rizal in Dapitan =

- Official VHS cover
- Directed by: Tikoy Aguiluz
- Screenplay by: Pete Lacaba
- Story by: Lualhati Bautista; Tikoy Aguiluz; Noel Vera; Vic Torres; Mirana Medina-Bhunjun; Kim D. Wabwab; Marie Punerama; Alexandria D. Magiba; Elena Magdangal; Michelle Pangilinan
- Produced by: Tikoy Aguiluz
- Starring: Albert Martinez; Amanda Page
- Cinematography: Nap Jamir; Romy Vitug
- Edited by: Mirana Medina-Bhunjun
- Music by: Nonong Buencamino
- Production companies: Independent Cinema Association of the Philippines; PLDT; Movipix International
- Distributed by: Falcon Films; Viva Video
- Release date: 1997
- Running time: 100 minutes
- Country: Philippines
- Languages: Filipino; Spanish; English

Rizal in Dapitan (Filipino: Rizal sa Dapitan) is a 1997 Philippine biographical film directed by Tikoy Aguiluz about the four-year exile of Filipino propagandist and patriot José Rizal in Dapitan, starring Albert Martinez as Rizal and Amanda Page as Josephine Bracken. The screenplay was written by Pete Lacaba.

== Plot ==
José Rizal is exiled to Dapitan in 1892 and begins adapting to his new home. He helps the local residents by offering free education to all children and befriends a student, Jose Asiniero, in the process. He also renders his services as a doctor and treats his mother, Doña Teodora Alonzo, who visits him with his sisters Maria and Narcisa.

In the course of his exile, Rizal meets Josephine Bracken, who accompanies her stepfather George Taufer, who seeks treatment for his blindness. Bracken falls in love with Rizal and eventually moves in with him, leaving Taufer. They decide to marry, but are refused a Church wedding on political grounds. The couple settles for a common-law marriage despite initial opposition from Rizal's family, and have a stillborn son whom Rizal names Francisco. Later, Pio Valenzuela, a representative of the Katipunan, visits him and announces the group's plans to stage a revolution, but Rizal refuses to join them.

The film closes with Rizal leaving Dapitan to volunteer as a doctor in Cuba as the locals mourn him. An epilogue explains Rizal's subsequent arrest, his execution and its birthing the Philippine Revolution.

== Cast ==
- Albert Martinez as Dr. José Rizal
- Amanda Page as Josephine Bracken
- Roy Alvarez as Capt. Ricardo Carnicero
- Jaime Fabregas as Fr. Francisco Paula de Sanchez
- Candy Pangilinan as Maria Rizal
- Tess Dumpit as Narcisa Rizal
- Rustica Carpio as Teodora Alonso Realonda
- Noni Buencamino as Pío Valenzuela
- Carelle Manuela as Manuela Orlac
- Soliman Cruz as Pablo Mercado
- Junell Hernando as Jose "Josielito" D. Aseniero (student of Rizal and later governor of Zamboanga del Norte)
- Chris Michelena as Fr. Obach
- Paul Holmes as George Tauffer

== Production ==
=== Development ===
Antonio Samson, then the senior vice president of PLDT, came up with the idea of making a film about the time José Rizal was exiled in Dapitan, and brought it to director Tikoy Aguiluz.

=== Production ===
The film was shot entirely in the City of Dapitan, Zamboanga del Norte on 16 mm film. Up to June 1997, the film was simply titled Dapitan. Aguiluz originally meant for the film to have a shorter length for release on television, but he eventually decided against it, convincing the producers to let him extend it to feature-length.

== Release ==
Rizal sa Dapitan was an entry of the Manila Film Festival in mid-1997, where it won 12 awards, including the Rajah Sulayman Award for Best Picture. However, it was not commercially successful during its theatrical run. GMA Network, which was producing a different film about Rizal through its own film studio, acquired the television broadcast rights to Rizal sa Dapitan.

The film's international version held its premiere on September 30, 1997, at the Film Center of the University of the Philippines Diliman, with the event billed with the subtitle "Film Gift to the Nation".

It was screened at the Brussels International Film Festival, where it won the Grand Jury Prize and the best actor award for Albert Martinez.

== See also ==
- José Rizal (film)
- Bayaning 3rd World
