= 1986 Metro Manila Film Festival =

Film festival edition

- Date: December 25, 1986 to January 3, 1987
- Site: Manila

Highlights
- Best Picture: none (Note: Many awards were not given including the "Best Picture" category. Only the "Third Best Picture Award was given.); Halimaw(3rd Best Picture)
- Most awards: Halimaw (10)

The 12th Metro Manila Film Festival was held in December 1986. It was the first edition of the festival in eight years to be primarily sponsored by the Metro Manila Commission (now the Metro Manila Development Authority) and not by MOWELFUND.

NCV productions' Halimaw romped away 10 of the 12 awards given including the Best Director and Best Actor for Mario O'Hara and Best Actress for Liza Lorena among others. The film also garnered the Third Best Picture Award. Romy Vitug won the Best Cinematography Award for Celso Ad. Castillo's Payaso while the director's son, Chris Ad. Castillo, received the Best Supporting Actor Award for Augusto Buenaventura's Bagets Gang.

== Entries ==
Title	Starring	Studio	Director	Genre
Bagets Gang	Jinggoy Estrada, Rio Locsin, ER Ejercito, Robin Padilla, Christopher Ad. Castillo	Amazaldy Film Production	Augusto Buenaventura	Action, drama
Bangkay Mo Akong Hahakbangan	Dante Varona, Melissa Mendez, Paquito Diaz, Millicent Bautista, Aurora Sevilla, Fred Moro, Usman Hassim, Rocco Montalban, Joko Diaz	Bathala Films	Dante Varona	Action, war
Captain Barbell	Edu Manzano, Herbert Bautista, Lea Salonga, Dennis Da Silva, Bing Loyzaga, Nova Villa, Ruel Vernal, Rez Cortez, Beth Bautista	Viva Films	Leroy Salvador	Superhero comedy
Halimaw	Liza Lorena, Gina Pareno, Michael de Mesa, Mario O'Hara, Ruel Vernal, Maritess Gutierrez, Ronel Victor, Jaime Fabregas, Ian Kristoffer de Leon, Lotlot de Leon	NCV Films	Christopher de Leon & Mario O' Hara	Action, horror, comedy, fantasy
Payaso	German Moreno and the All-Star Cast	Sialina Film Enterprises	Celso Ad. Castillo	Comedy drama
Salamangkero: The Magician	Michael de Mesa, Gina Alajar, Liza Lorena, Armida Siguion-Reyna, Tanya Gomez, Dick Israel, Odette Khan, Ruben Rustia, Tom-Tom, Sunshine	Aces Films	Tata Esteban	Fantasy horror
Tuklaw	Charito Solis, Nadia Montenegro, Anjo Yllana, Richard Gomez, Janice Jurado, Zandro Zamora, Lucita Soriano, Jaime Fabregas, Robert Talabis	Golden Lion Films	Carlo J. Caparas	Comedy drama

== Winners and nominees ==
=== Awards ===
Winners are listed first and highlighted in boldface.

Best Film	Best Director
None; Halimaw - NCV productions (3rd); Bagets Gang; Payaso	Mario O'Hara – Halimaw (segment "Halimaw sa Banga")
Best Actor	Best Actress
**Mario O'Hara – Halimaw (segment "Halimaw sa Banga")**	Liza Lorena – Halimaw (segment "Halimaw sa Banga")
Best Supporting Actor	Best Supporting Actress
**Christopher Ad. Castillo – Bagets Gang**	Maritess Gutierrez – Halimaw (segment "Halimaw sa Banga")
Best Art Direction	Best Cinematography
**Frank G. Rivera – Halimaw**	Romeo Vitug – Payaso
Best Sound Engineering	Best Music
**Rodel Capule – Halimaw**	Jaime Fabregas – Halimaw
Best Child Performer	Best Editing
**Ian Kristoffer de Leon – Halimaw (segment "Komiks")**	Efren Jarlego – Halimaw

== Multiple awards ==
Awards	Film
10	Halimaw sa Banga

== Ceremony Information ==
=== Gabi ng Parangal ===
The following are the key people during the "Gabi ng Parangal".

- Guest Speaker: Kris Aquino - representative of President Cory Aquino
- Metro Manila Commission officer in charge and executive chairman of the 1986 MMFF - Joey Lina

=== Lack of award categories ===
The 1986 Metro Manila Film Festival was considered the worst in the 12-year history of the annual 10-day festival of local movies. For the first time, it did not give out the traditional first and second Best Picture awards as well as the other two categories: Best Story and Best Screenplay. According to one of the jurors, Tingting Cojuangco stated: "No one of the seven entries deserved these awards..." He added that they: "...would like to express [their] concern over the current state of the Philippine movie industry as reflected in the entries to the year's MMFF...[The entries] failed to reinforce and inculcate positive Filipino values by portraying negative stereotypes, imitating foreign films and perpetuating commercially-oriented movies...".

== Notes ==
Preceded by 1985 Metro Manila Film Festival	Metro Manila Film Festival; 1986	Succeeded by 1987 Metro Manila Film Festival
