= No Retreat... No Surrender... Si Kumander =

1987 Filipino film starring Fernando Poe Jr. and Susan Roces

- Directed by: Pablo Santiago
- Written by: Pablo Gomez; Fred Navarro
- Produced by: FPJ
- Starring: Fernando Poe Jr.; Susan Roces
- Cinematography: Ver P. Reyes
- Edited by: Augusto Salvador
- Music by: Jimmy Fabregas
- Production company: FPJ Productions
- Release date: September 17, 1987
- Country: Philippines
- Language: Filipino

No Retreat... No Surrender... Si Kumander is a 1987 Filipino action comedy film directed by Pablo Santiago and starring Fernando Poe Jr. and his wife Susan Roces, the latter as the titular commander. Produced by FPJ Productions, the film was released on September 17, 1987. Critic Luciano E. Soriano of the Manila Standard gave Kumander a mildly positive review, commending Poe and Roces' "delightful" performances while deeming the film "mildly amusing" and "an over-extended [TV] sitcom".

== Plot ==
The story follows a married couple Gener and Benita. Gener is an automobile entrepreneur and mechanic while Gener is a possessive housewife who goes berserk when her husband gets entangled with a younger woman.

== Cast ==
Main cast

- Fernando Poe Jr. as Gener, a car dealer
- Susan Roces as Benita, a barangay chairperson and real estate agent

Supporting cast

- Sheryl Cruz
- Randy Santiago as Einstein, a scientist
- Paquito Diaz
- Bong Dimayacyac
- Chichay as Lola Baby
- Dencio Padilla as Dennis
- Bayani Casimiro as Lolo Boy
- Tina Loy
- Mely Tagasa as Honorata, Benita's friend
- Tatlong Pinoy
- Bamba
- Max Alvarado
- Janice Jurado
- Joseph Sonora
- Jeffrey Sonora
- Lollibie
- Becky Misa
- Vic Varrion
- Luis Benedicto
- Nonoy de Guzman
- Belo Borja
- Eddie Tuazon
- Jimmy Reyes
- Dennis Padilla

== Release ==
The film was given a "G" rating by the Movie and Television Review and Classification Board (MTRCB), and was released on September 17, 1987.

=== Critical response ===
Luciano E. Soriano, writing for the Manila Standard, gave Kumander a mildy positive review, stating that the film was a "mildly amusing situation comedy" with varying degrees of success in terms of comedic performances from the actors, though he considers Fernando Poe Jr. and Susan Roces "delightful" in their roles. Soriano also deems it to at least be superior to other local comedies for relying on its situations instead of facial expressions and toilet humor.
