= Magkasangga 2000 =

1993 Filipino-Hong Kong film by Phillip Ko

- Directed by: Phillip Ko; Joe Mari Avellana; Johnny Wood
- Written by: Joe Mari Avellana
- Produced by: Chi Ming Chan; Ricky Wong Ka-Kui
- Starring: Ricky Davao; Cynthia Luster; Monsour del Rosario
- Cinematography: Raymond Chang; Rey Lapid
- Edited by: Phillip Ko; Rodolfo Tabo-Tabo
- Music by: Jaime Fabregas
- Production company: Harvest International Films
- Distributed by: Harvest International Films
- Release date: October 6, 1993
- Running time: 100 minutes
- Countries: Philippines; Hong Kong
- Languages: Filipino; English; Cantonese

Magkasangga 2000 (International title: Ultracop 2000) is a 1993 action sci-fi film directed by Phillip Ko, Joe Mari Avellana and Johnny Wood. A Filipino-Hong Kong co-production, the film stars Ricky Davao, Cynthia Luster and Monsour del Rosario.

The film is streaming online on YouTube.

== Plot ==
Set in the year 2000, interplanetary outlaw Zorback ignores the Universal Treaty by traveling to Earth to wreak havoc. The Ultracops, led by Superintendent Nuñez, are the only ones who can stop him.

== Cast ==
- Ricky Davao as Tony Braganza
- Cynthia Luster as Trishia Marks
- Monsour del Rosario as Jared
- Eddie Gutierrez as Superintendent Nuñez
- Gabriel Romulo as Zorbak
- Charlie Davao as Tecson
- Phillip Ko as Benny Gabaldon
- Melvin Wong as Drago
- Bernardo Bernardo as Ador
- Jaime Fabregas as Prof. Duval
- Elenor Academea as Elenor
- Rando Almanzor as Russel McBean
- Larissa Ledesma as Gina Braganza
- Jimmy Ko as Jimmy
- James Hermogenes as Allan Corpuz
- Bhong Villegas as Ronnie
