= Josephine Bracken =

Wife of Filipino nationalist José Rizal

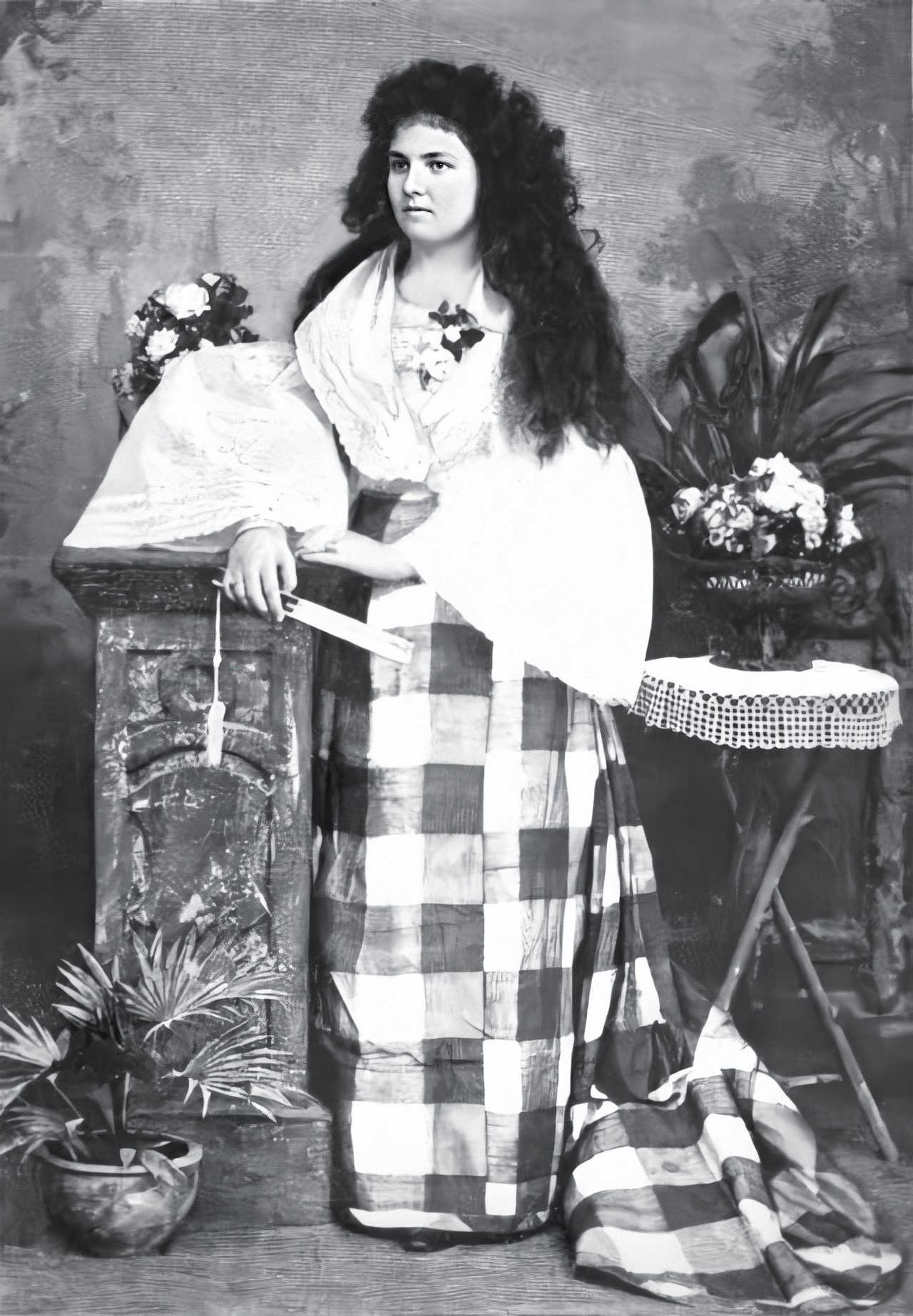
- A studio portrait of Bracken in Filipino attire, 1896
- Born: Marie Josephine Leopoldine Bracken; 9 August 1876; Victoria, British Hong Kong
- Died: 14 March 1902 (aged 25); British Hong Kong
- Resting place: Happy Valley Cemetery; Hong Kong
- Other name: Josefina
- Known for: La viuda de Rizal (The widow of Rizal)
- Spouses: José Rizal (m. 1896; died 1896) Vicente Abad (m. 1898)
- Children: 2

Marie Josephine Leopoldine Bracken (August 9, 1876 – March 14, 1902) was the common-law wife of Filipino nationalist José Rizal during his exile in Dapitan. Hours before Rizal's execution on December 30, 1896, the couple were allegedly married at Fort Santiago following Rizal's alleged reconciliation with the Catholic Church. Some sectors, including Rizal's family, dispute the marriage because no records were found regarding the union, even if it was attested by Bracken herself and the officiating priest.

Bracken was born in Hong Kong to Irish parents and was adopted by her blind American godfather. In 1895, Bracken traveled to Dapitan to accompany her adoptive father who wanted to seek treatment from Rizal, an ophthalmologist who previously practiced in Hong Kong. There, Bracken and Rizal began their relationship but were unable to get married due to Rizal's conflict with the Church officials. Nonetheless, they cohabited and she gave birth to a premature son who died shortly after birth.

After Rizal's execution, Bracken supported the Filipino revolutionaries. However, the Spanish colonial authorities coerced her to leave the Philippines. After returning to Hong Kong, she remarried to a Filipino businessman and had a daughter. She died of tuberculosis, aged 25.

== Biography ==
=== Early life ===
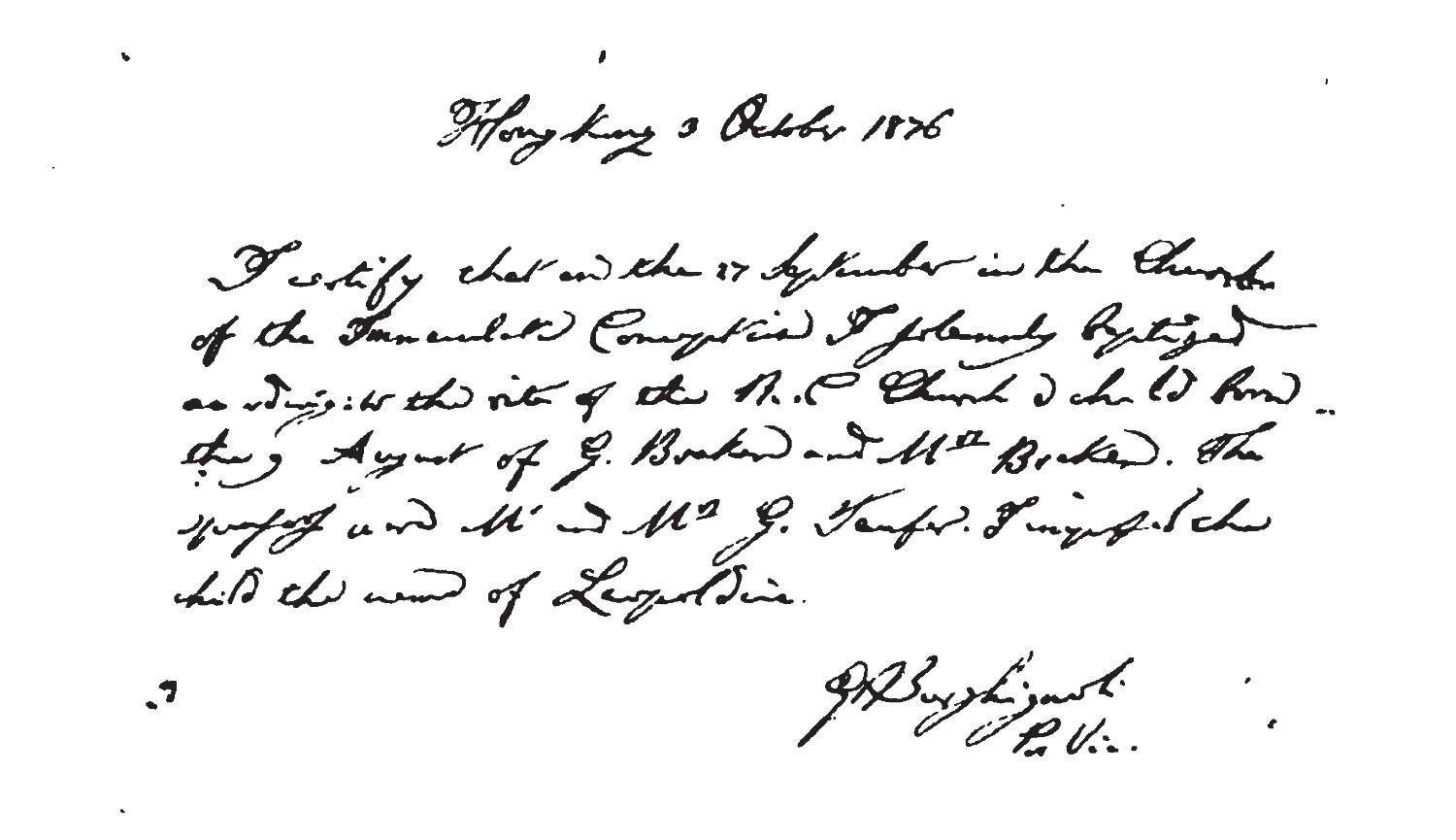
A copy of Bracken's baptismal certificate

She was born in Victoria Barracks in Hong Kong on August 9, 1876, to Irish parents James Bracken, a corporal in the British Army, and Elizabeth Jane McBride, who were married on May 3, 1868, in Belfast, Ireland. After her mother died shortly after childbirth, her father gave her up for adoption. She was taken in by her godfather, the American George Taufer, a blind and fairly well-to-do engineer of the pumping plant of the Hong Kong Fire Department, and his late Portuguese wife. Taufer later remarried another Portuguese woman from Macau, Francesca Spencer, with whom he had another daughter.

In 1891, the second Mrs Taufer died, and the two young women managed the Taufer home.

After that, Taufer decided to remarry again, but the new wife was a challenge for Bracken to deal with. She spent two months in the Convent of the Canossian Sisters, where she previously attended early years of school. She decided to return only after Taufer called at the convent's door, pleading with her to return home as his third wife was a bad housekeeper. Shortly after a few months, she had trouble again with the third Mrs Taufer, who haunted her out of the house.

=== Relationship with Rizal ===
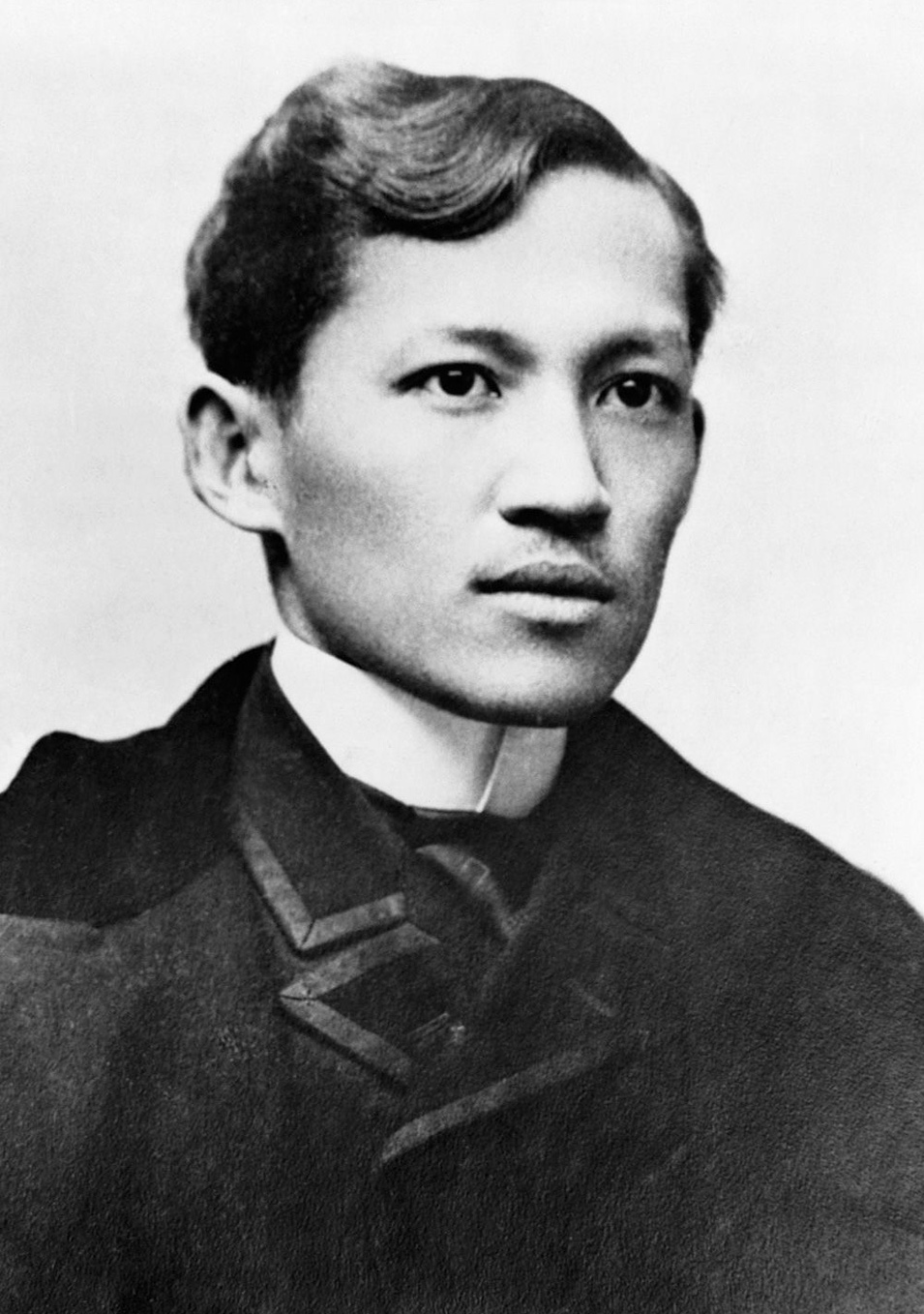
José Rizal, writer and national hero of the Philippines

Bracken later recommended that her blind adoptive father see José Rizal, who was a respected ophthalmologist and had practised at Rednaxela Terrace in Hong Kong. By this time, he was a political exile in Dapitan in southern Philippines. The family sailed to the Philippines and arrived in Manila on February 5, 1895, and later that month, Bracken and Taufer sailed to Dapitan.

Taufer's double cataract was beyond Rizal's help, but he fell in love with Bracken. Taufer vehemently opposed the union but finally yielded. Bracken accompanied Taufer to Manila on his way back to Hong Kong, together with Rizal's sister, Narcisa, on March 14, 1895. Rizal applied for marriage, but because of his writings and political stance, the local priest Father Obach would only agree to the ceremony if Rizal obtain permission from the Bishop of Cebu. Either the Bishop did not write him back or Rizal was not able to mail the letter because of Taufer's sudden departure.

Before returning to Dapitan to live with Rizal, Bracken introduced herself to his family members in Manila. His mother suggested a civil marriage, which she believed to be a lesser "sacrament" but free from hypocrisy— and thus less a burden to Rizal's conscience— than making any political retraction. Nevertheless, Bracken and Rizal lived together as husband and wife in Barangay Talisay, Dapitan, beginning in July 1895. The couple had a son, Francisco Rizal y Bracken, who was born prematurely and died within a few hours of birth.

While she was in a delicate condition, Rizal played a prank on her that was harmless in itself, which startled her so that she sprang forward and was struck against an iron stand. Though it was purely an accident and Rizal was scarcely at fault, he blamed himself for it, and his later devotion seems largely to have been trying to make amends.

=== Rizal's last days ===
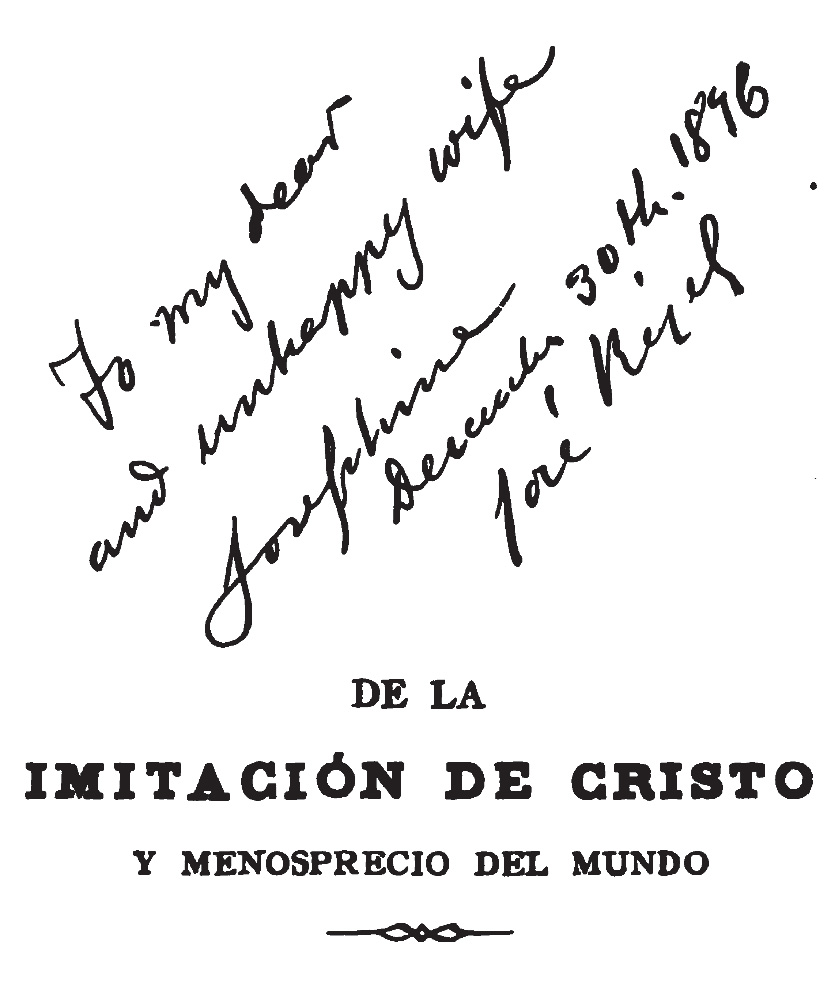
The title page of a Spanish edition of the Imitation of Christ that was Rizal's wedding and parting gift to his wife. His dedication is written in English.

On the evening before his execution on December 30, 1896, on charges of treason, rebellion, and sedition by the Spanish colonial government, the Catholic Church claimed that Rizal returned to the faith and was married to Bracken in a religious ceremony officiated by Father Vicente Balaguer, S.J. sometime between 5:00 AM and 6:00 AM, an hour before his scheduled execution at 7:00 AM. Despite claims by Father Balaguer and Bracken herself, some sectors, including members of Rizal's family, disputed that the wedding had occurred because no records were found attesting to the union.

=== After Rizal's death ===
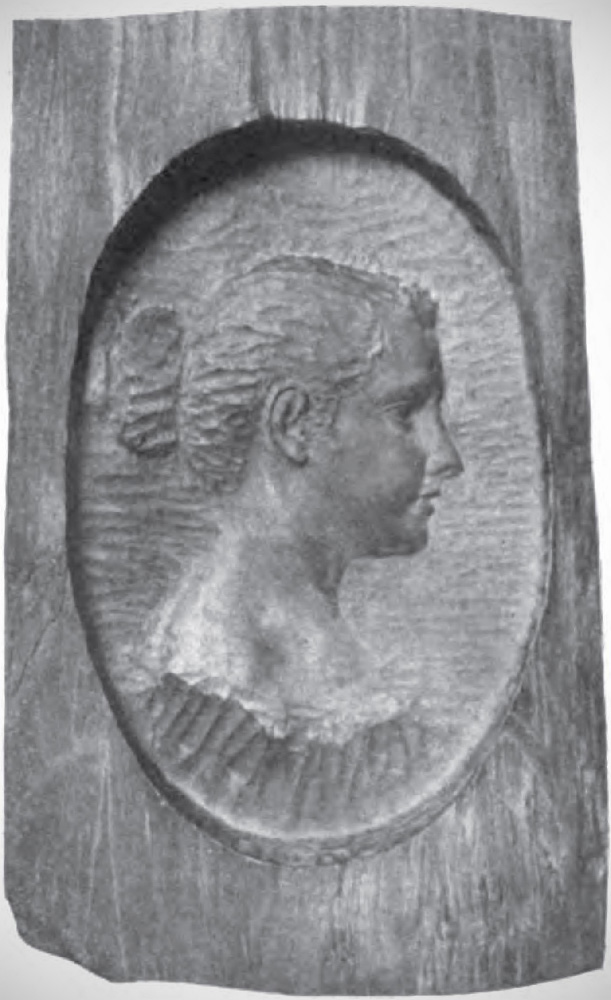
A carving of Josephine by Jose Rizal

Following Rizal's death, Bracken joined revolutionary forces in Cavite province, where she took care of sick and wounded soldiers, boosting their morale, and helping operate reloading jigs for Mauser cartridges at the Imus Arsenal under revolutionary general Pantaleón García. Imus was under threat of recapture, so Bracken, making her way through the thicket and mud, moved with the operation to the Cavite mountain redoubt of Maragondon. She witnessed the Tejeros Convention on March 22, 1897, before returning to Manila, and was later summoned by the Spanish Governor-General, who threatened her with torture and imprisonment if she did not leave the colony. Owing, however, to her adoptive father's American citizenship, she could not be forcibly deported, but Bracken voluntarily returned to Hong Kong upon the advice of the American consul in Manila.

=== Later life ===
Upon returning to Hong Kong, she once more lived in her father's house. After his death, she married Vicente Abad, a Cebuano mestizo who represented his father's tabacalera company in the British territory, on December 14, 1898. A daughter, Dolores Abad y Bracken, was born to the couple on April 17, 1900. A later testimony of Abad affirms that her mother "was already suffering from tuberculosis of the larynx" at the time of the wedding.

Bracken died of tuberculosis on March 14, 1902 in Hong Kong and was interred at the Happy Valley Cemetery.

== Inconsistencies ==
- British historian Austin Coates allegedly found Bracken's birth certificate in Hong Kong and reported it as tampered. He claimed she was probably the illegitimate daughter of an unknown Englishman and a Chinese mother.
- American historian Austin Craig reported that Bracken returned to the Philippines and lived in Cebu with her new husband, Vicente Abad. She gave lessons in English, like she told Rizal during their last meeting, at first privately in Cebu, where one of her pupils allegedly became the first Speaker of the Philippine Assembly (Sergio Osmeña). She also taught English at the Colegio de la Inmaculada Concepción in Cebu for a while, attested to by one of her pupils, Encarnación Bernad (1887–1969). Afterwards, Bracken worked as a government employee in public schools and at the Liceo de Manila, a school in Intramuros (which is unrelated to the present Lyceum of the Philippines University).

== In popular media ==
- Amanda Page played Josephine Bracken in Rizal sa Dapitan (1997).
- Chin Chin Gutierrez portrayed Josephine in José Rizal (1998)
- Lara Fabregas, played Josephine Bracken in Bayaning 3rd World (1999)
- Eugene Domingo, played Josephine Bracken in Ang Babae sa Septic Tank 3: The Real Untold Story of Josephine Bracken (2019)

== Sources ==
- Acibo, Libert Amorganda and Galicano-Adanza, Estela (1995). "Jose P. Rizal: His Life, Works and Role in the Philippine Revolution". Rex Book Store, Manila. ISBN 971-23-1837-0.
- Anderson, Benedict Richard O'Gorman (2005). Under Three Flags: Anarchism and the Anti-Colonial Imagination. Verso. p. 132. ISBN 1-84467-037-6.
- Cabrera, Rizal and Josephine, 15, 33.
- Craig, Austin (1913). "Lineage, life, and labors of José Rizal, Philippine patriot". Yonkers-on-Hudson World Book Company.
- De Pedro, J. (2005). Rizal through a glass darkly. Pasig: University of Asia and the Pacific.
- Fadul, Jose A. (2008). "Encyclopedia Rizaliana: Student Edition". Lulu.com. ISBN 978-1-4303-1142-3.
- Younghusband, George John (1899). "The Philippines and round about". Norwood Press, MA.
