= Rowell Santiago =

Filipino actor and film director (born 1963)

- Born: Rowell Joseph Legaspi Santiago; November 11, 1963 (age 62); Manila, Philippines
- Education: De La Salle University
- Occupations: Actor, director, producer
- Years active: 1976–present
- Father: Pablo P. Santiago
- Relatives: Randy Santiago (brother); Raymart Santiago (brother); Pauleen Luna (niece)

Rowell Joseph Legaspi Santiago (born November 11, 1963) is a Filipino actor, film director and producer.

== Early life and education ==
Santiago is born on November 11, 1963 to Pablo P. Santiago, director and producer and Cielito Legaspi, former actress. He is the second child among of six siblings including Randy Santiago, Raymart Santiago, Rieley "Jun-Jun" Pablo Santiago, Rhea Santiago and Resciel Santiago.

He studied marketing in De La Salle University.

== Career ==
Santiago started his acting career in supporting roles in his father, Pablo Santiago directed movies Bato sa Buhangin (1976) and Kumander Ulopong (1978) which starred action-star Fernando Poe Jr.

In the 1980s, he appeared in movies Cross My Heart (1982) and Friends in love (1983) with actress Sharon Cuneta. After five years, they were reunited in movies 3 Mukha ng Pag-ibig (1988), Oras-oras, Araw-araw (1989) and Biktima (1990). Santiago continued working with Sharon Cuneta as one of the directors in the variety show The Sharon Cuneta Show (1998-2004).

He took a decade-long hiatus from acting, and worked behind camera as a director. On television, Santiago was offered roles in the television series Lobo (2008) and Lovers in Paris (2009), but turned it down. He was offered the role of President Juan Policarpio in the series Tanging Yaman (2010), but took some time to accept it.

In 2017, he was offered a role in the book 2 of the action television series Ang Probinsyano but turned it down, the role changed and the character was scratched. The following year, the show producers offered him the role of the President with a complete Presidential cast with First Lady, played by Dawn Zulueta and Vice President Edu Manzano. He became interested and accepted the role of President Oscar Hidalgo in the television series Ang Probinsyano (2018-2022).

== Personal life ==
Santiago previously dated actress Sharon Cuneta.

== Filmography ==
=== Films ===
Year	Title	Role	Notes
1976	Bato sa Buhangin		
1978	Kumander Ulopong		
1982	Cross My Heart		
1982	Just Say You Love Me		
1982	Pag-ibig Na		
1982	Dear God		
1983	JR		
1983	Friends in love		
1984	Johnny Rambotang-go Part III		
1984	Ang Batang Yagit		
1984	Ang Panday IV		
1985	Ulo ng Gapo	Roland	
1985	Muling Buksan ang Puso	Aris	
1985	Hinugot sa Langit	Bobby	
1985	Doctor, Doctor We Are Sick		
1985	I Can't Stop Loving You	Chris Villena	
1987	Feliciano Luces: Alyas Kumander Toothpick, Mindanao		Producer
1987	Operation: Get Victor Corpuz, the Rebel Soldier		
1988	3 Mukha ng Pag-ibig	Louie (segment "Ang Silid")	
1988	Babaeng Hampaslupa	Mario	
1988	Lord, Bakit Ako Pa?	Manuel	
1989	Oras-oras, Araw-araw		
1990	Paikot-ikot		Director
1990	Biktima	Atty. Dave Pascual	
1990	The Return of Johnny Tanggo Laff-in	Apprentice	
1994	Forever		Director
2001	Luv Text	Ryan	Director
2008	A Very Special Love	Art Montenegro	
2009	You Changed My Life	Art Montenegro	
2013	It Takes a Man and a Woman	Art Montenegro	
2019	3pol Trobol: Huli Ka Balbon!	Ernesto Guillermo	
2020	Magikland	Tito2	

=== Television ===
==== Drama series ====
Year	Title	Role	Notes
1982–1983	OK Sha!		
1991–1995	Maalaala Mo Kaya		6 episodes
2010	Tanging Yaman	Juan Policarpio	
2015–2016	You're My Home	Mike Macaraig	
2018–2022	FPJ'S Ang Probinsyano	President Oscar Hidalgo / Mariano Patag	
2022	Start-Up PH		
2023–2024	Can't Buy Me Love	Wilson Chavez Tiu	
2025	Lolong	Manuel	
2026	Someone, Someday	Enrico Dominguez	

==== Television shows ====
Year	Title	Role	Notes
1998–2004	The Sharon Cuneta Show	Director	
2006	Star Magic Presents	Director	1 Episode
2011–2013	Pinoy Explorer	Director	

=== Music video ===
Year	Title	Notes
2023	ABS-CBN Christmas Special ID 2023: Pasko ang Pinakamagandang Kwento	Director
