= Bayaning 3rd World =

- Theatrical release poster
- Directed by: Mike de Leon
- Written by: Mike de Leon; Clodualdo del Mundo Jr.
- Produced by: Mike de Leon; Pinky Ibarra; Eliza Tamayo
- Starring: Ricky Davao; Cris Villanueva; Joel Torre
- Cinematography: Ding Achacoso
- Edited by: Armando Jarlego
- Music by: Lorrie Ilustre
- Production company: Cinema Artists Philippines
- Distributed by: Solar Films
- Release dates: January 14, 2000 (Glorietta); February 16, 2000 (Philippines)
- Running time: 93 minutes
- Country: Philippines
- Language: Filipino

Bayaning 3rd World (English: 3rd World Hero) is a 2000 Philippine mockumentary film co-produced and directed by Mike de Leon from a screenplay he co-wrote with Clodualdo del Mundo Jr. Shot in black-and-white, the film stars Ricky Davao and Cris Villanueva as two filmmakers discussing how to go about creating a film on José Rizal.

The film was a return for de Leon after a nearly eight-year hiatus from filmmaking. It was well received by critics upon release but failed to impress at the box office. The Manunuri ng Pelikulang Pilipino (Filipino Film Critics) included Bayaning 3rd World on their list of the Ten Best Films of the Decade.

In 2000, the Department of Education, Culture, and Sports (DECS), under Secretary Andrew Gonzalez, called it an innovative film and endorsed it to schools, teachers, and students for the "invaluable lessons that can be learned from the story."

== Plot ==
Two filmmakers (Ricky Davao and Cris Villanueva) are absorbed with the idea of creating a film about the life of presumptive Philippine national hero José Rizal. In particular, the filmmakers are interested in the controversy of whether Rizal retracted his anti-Catholic sentiments before his execution.

The filmmakers investigate Rizal's life by "interviewing" key individuals, i.e., recreating scenes as they go through Rizal's historical correspondence and other documents. The interviews are done with his mother, Doña Teodora, his siblings Trining, Narcisa, and Paciano, his love interest and alleged wife Josephine Bracken, and the Jesuit priest who supposedly witnessed Rizal's retraction, Padre Balaguer.

Over the course of the investigation, the filmmakers are unable to reconcile conflicting testimonies, their own personal biases, and the doubts and uncertainties that plague accounts of Rizal's life, writings, and beliefs. Eventually, the filmmakers give up on creating a definitive account of Rizal and uncovering the truth about the retraction controversy, instead concluding that every person has their own concept of the national hero ("kanya-kanyang Rizal").

== Cast ==
- Ricky Davao as Filmmaker 1
- Joel Torre as José Rizal
- Cris Villanueva as Filmmaker 2
- Daria Ramirez as Doña Teodora
- Rio Locsin as Trining
- Cherry Pie Picache as Narcisa
- Joonee Gamboa as Paciano Rizal
- Lara Fabregas as Josephine Bracken
- Ed Rocha as Padre Balaguer
- Lui Manansala as Maria

== Production ==
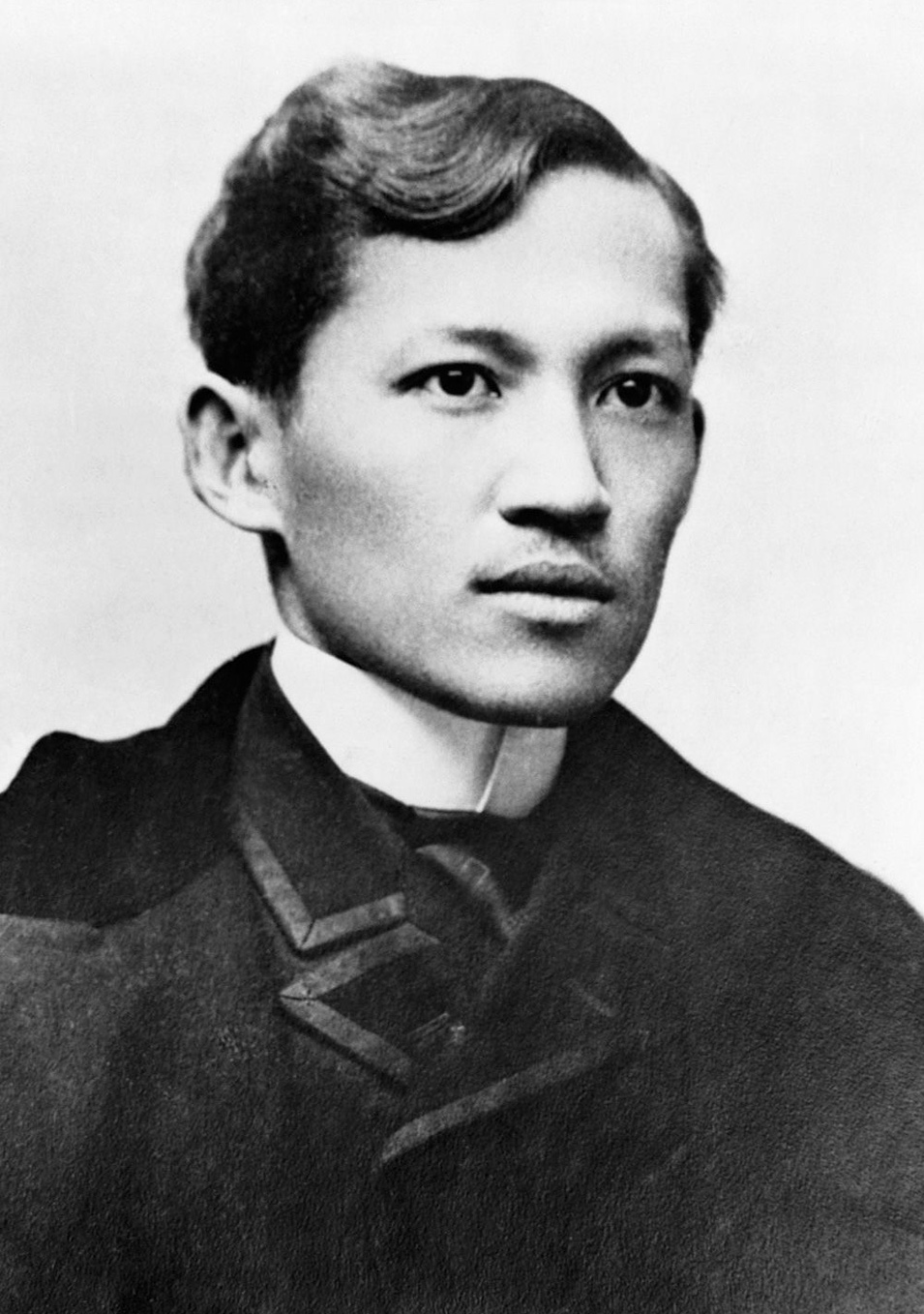
Director Mike de Leon and screenwriter Clodualdo del Mundo Jr. were interested in creating a film about Jose Rizal (pictured above) that was different from previous films.

=== Development ===
In 1996, Mike de Leon and frequent collaborator Clodualdo del Mundo Jr. were in talks with GMA Pictures, then called Cinemax, to work on a film on the life of José Rizal, to be played by Aga Muhlach. Both the director and star left the project during the pre-production stage. GMA Pictures eventually got director Marilou Diaz-Abaya to make the 1998 biopic José Rizal starring Cesar Montano. Nevertheless, according to del Mundo, both he and de Leon were still interested in pursuing a Rizal related film project, although one conceptually different from the original proposal.

=== Filming ===
The film was shot at the ancestral home of de Leon in San Miguel, Bulacan, where in 1976 he shot his directorial debut Itim. Nonoy Marcelo, who directed the first animated film Tadhana, participated as an animator in Noli and Fili parts of the film.

== Reception ==
Based on a pre-release screening, the film received the first "A" rating of the Film Ratings Board. Members of the Film Ratings Board exclaimed that the film brought them hope that the local film industry would see improvement at the start of the new millennium. They noted that de Leon managed to tackle the difficult subject of Rizal in a "accessible, comprehensible, and even exciting" manner that younger audiences could relate to.

Noel Vera, writing for BusinessWorld, considered Bayaning 3rd World better than the 1998 José Rizal film. Praising the unique and imaginative approach to Rizal's life, Vera concludes: "This may not be a Rizal film, but it's a remarkable Rizal film nevertheless." There were similar, positive reviews by Nestor Torre of the Philippine Daily Inquirer, Zenaida Amador of Manila Bulletin, and Ricky Gallardo of the Philippine Post, among others.

In a mixed review, however, Boo Chanco of The Philippine Star found that although it was an "interesting, smart alecky film," it failed to offer an idea of what a national hero should be.

In 2004, the New York-based film magazine Film Comment included Bayaning 3rd World on their "Terra Incognita" list of "unknown pleasures that made our 10 Best." The critic Olaf Moller found the film "an ironic, wickedly playful modernist epic."

=== Accolades ===
The film was nominated for 11 of the 13 awards at the 1999 Gawad Urian, winning six: Best Picture, Best Director, Best Supporting Actor (Joel Torre), Best Cinematography, Best Sound, and Best Music. The Young Critics Circle Film Desk Citations awarded Bayaning 3rd World with Best Film, tied with Tanging Yaman, along with Best Achievement in Cinematography and Visual Design, Best Editing, and Best Achievement in Sound and Aural Orchestration.

== See also ==
- Rizal sa Dapitan - 1997 Filipino film about Jose Rizal's exile in Dapitan
- Jose Rizal - 1998 Filipino film on the life of Jose Rizal
