= Ipinanganak Na ang Taong Papatay sa Iyo =

Philippine action film

Ipinanganak Na ang Taong Papatay Sa Iyo
- Directed by: Roland Ledesma
- Screenplay by: Roland Ledesma; Jojo Lapus
- Story by: Roland Ledesma
- Produced by: Roland Ledesma
- Starring: Ronald Gan Ledesma; Beth Tamayo; Jimmy Santos
- Cinematography: Apolinario Cuenco
- Edited by: Nap Montebon
- Music by: Jaime Fabregas
- Production company: Sunlight Films
- Distributed by: Sunlight Films
- Release date: October 4, 2000
- Running time: 100 minutes
- Country: Philippines
- Language: Filipino

Ipinanganak Na ang Taong Papatay Sa Iyo is a 2000 Philippine action film written, produced and directed by Roland Ledesma. The film stars Ronald Gan Ledesma, Beth Tamayo and Jimmy Santos.

The film is streaming online on YouTube.

== Cast ==
- Ronald Gan Ledesma as Daniel
- Beth Tamayo as Lina
- Jimmy Santos as Buboy
- Joonee Gamboa as Mang Asyong
- Jaime Fabregas as Don Roque
- Ray Ventura as Ruben
- Daria Ramirez as Leticia
- Bob Soler as Antonio Torres
- Rhey Roldan as Sgt. Lopez
- Brando Legaspi as Johnny
- Yam Ledesma as Delia
- Ervie Mateo as Boyet
- Ervin Mateo as Capt. Reyes

== Awards ==
Year	Awards	Category	Recipient	Result	Ref.
2001	2001 FAMAS Awards	Best Child Actor	Ervie Mateo	Won	
