= Halimaw =

- Directed by: Christopher Krauss de Leon; Mario O'Hara
- Written by: Uro dela Cruz (story and screenplay) ("Komiks"); Frank Rivera and Mario O'Hara (story and screenplay) ("Halimaw sa Banga")
- Produced by: Nora Aunor (Executive Producer) (as Nora C. Villamayor); Oscar Villamayor (Supervising Producer)
- Starring: Ian De Leon (credited as Kristoffer Ian De Leon); Gina Pareño; Michael De Mesa; Ruel Vernal; Jaime Fabregas (credited as Jimmy Fabregas); Monossi Mempin; Joanne Miller; Lotlot de Leon; Liza Lorena; Mario O’Hara; Maritess Guetirrez; Mary Walter; Ronnel Victor; Marilyn Villamayor
- Cinematography: Johnny Araojo (segment "Banga"); Rody Lacap(segment "Komiks")
- Edited by: Efren Jarlego
- Music by: Jaime Fabregas (as Jimmy Fabregas)
- Release date: December 25, 1986
- Country: Philippines
- Language: Filipino

Halimaw (lit. 'Monster') is a horror anthology Filipino film directed by Christopher de Leon (credited as Christopher Strauss de Leon) and Mario O’Hara. The film is released on December 25, 1986, as part of the Metro Manila Film Festival and produced by NCV films, the film is divided in two stories; ‘Komiks’ and ’Halimaw sa Banga.’

‘Komiks’ tells the story of a young child who stole a comic book from a mysterious house, the segment is written and screenplay by Uro dela Cruz. ‘Halimaw sa Banga’ is about an evil spirit living in a jar, in a wealthy household, the segment is written and screenplay by Frank Rivera and Mario O'Hara. 'Komiks' is the directorial debut of Christopher de Leon. Siblings, Ian and Lotlot de Leon both starred as each of the story's lead, they are also Christopher de Leon and Nora Aunor's, who served as the film's executive producer, offspring.

== Premise ==
"Komiks" follows a boy, Cocoy, who steals a mysterious comic book, unknowingly unleashing a monstrous warrior, Gorkrah, into the real world. As chaos ensues, Cocoy summons a hero, Argoknox, who defeats the monster and restores order.

"Halimaw sa Banga" tells the story of an ancient evil anito trapped inside a jar. As the jar’s owner, Margarita, and her family encounter strange deaths, the spirit grows stronger, leading to a terrifying final battle.

== Plot ==
=== Komiks ===
Two youthful friends, Cocoy and Nonoy stumble upon an abandoned house. The two enter the house and the door locks itself. A scared and reluctant Nonoy tries to escape while Cocoy explores the house. He is slowly attracted in a mysterious room and opens a chest containing a comic entitled ‘Komiks 1927.’ While trying to find his friend, Nonoy keeps injuring himself. The two find an open window and escape with Cocoy stealing the comics. At home, Cocoy is enjoying himself with the found comics, but he notices that the domesticated horses are acting bizarre. Cocoy's younger sister, Anna is a nosy brat while his parents are strict and neglectful. The comic tells a tale of a king named Visgoth from the kingdom of Anadrapura. He challenged his two greatest knights: Argoknox and Gorkrah, who are courting his daughter and the princess of Anadrapura. The two knights are equal until the final challenge, when Gorkrah receives a powerful sword from the evil species of Malignoids in exchange for his soul. He defeats Argoknox and marries the princess. But Gorkrah finds out that the sword is lustful of blood and chaos ensues in the kingdom. The old hermits assign a young man named Joth to find Argoknox, who is the only one who can bring back peace to the kingdom. Joth, after going through various obstacles, finds a phrase that brings Argoknax back to life. Argoknax and Gorkrah faces again but before Cocoy can finish the story, he is interrupted by his sister for supper. During the dinner, a mysterious noise is heard from the ceiling.

While Cocoy is sleeping, Gorkrah comes out of the comics and escapes from the house. The next day, Cocoy tells Nonoy about the comics and they found out that the following pages are unfinished however, the comics is confiscated by a teacher. Later, a couple in a park is attacked by Gorkrah. Cocoy is punished by his father for the comics. Cocoy learns of the attack on the couple on the news and recognizes the same mark from the couple's arm and the one from the comics. Gorkrah is later seen feeding on the horses at the house. In the middle of the night, Cocoy is disturbed by Gorkrah. Cocoy's father tries to confront him but is thrown on the floor. Gorkrah then proceeds to attack the Cocoy's family. Cocoy then summons Argoknox by saying the same phrase that was written in the comics. Argoknox engages in a sword fight with Gorkrah, ending with Argoknox winning. He then reveals himself to be the writer and thanks Cocoy for keeping his world alive and then disappears. The next morning, Cocoy and his father goes back to the abandoned house and returns the comics in the chest.

=== Halimaw sa Banga ===
In an archaeological excavation. An expensive jar (banga), is illegally bought by a lawyer named Margarita. Unbeknownst to her, the jar is home to an evil spirit who was burnt alive and crucified. On the night of her sister Regina's wake, her mother and nephews Toni, who is Regina's daughter, and Marlyn are in attendance. Margarita's mother asks her for the whereabouts of her husband Abe. While some of the visitor's kids are playing hide and seek, a boy hides inside the jar and gets consumed by the monster. Margarita and Abe begin arguing about their marriage. When Pabling, a house crew, witnesses the monster's hand coming out, he alerts the whole household, but nobody believes him. He tries to break the jar later but gets consumed by the monster. Each consumption of the monster frees herself from the pins that has been hindering it. Marlyn moves in with Toni and Margarita while Margarita hires a private investigator and catches photos of Abe cheating, she orders the investigator to get to know the girl more. One night, Toni lets Marlyn's suitor, Jericho, inside the house to talk to Marlyn. But while hiding, Jericho gets snatched by the monster, Marlyn also goes missing.

The family concludes that Jericho and Marlyn had eloped. Margarita confronts Abe in his workplace. Duke, Toni's suitor is also consumed by monster when he visits Toni but appears the next day and appears to be fine. Margarita, who disapproves of Duke, sees him kneeling in front of the jar and disappears. The next morning, Margarita scolds Toni for seeing Duke but she walks away when she slaps Toni. During a conversation, Duke pulls Toni away from the jar and warns her. Margarita sues Abe for concubinage and discovers that one of the maids is Abe's mistress. She meets with the maid but during the confrontation the maid is snatched by the monster in front of Margarita, who escapes with her car. She wakes up the next day, hearing voices and is scolded by a homeless man about her sin. Margarita decides to drop the case and makes amends with Abe, while attempting to give him the jar. But as Abe inspects it, the monster snatches him. Toni gets home and sees her father's shoe and blood on the jar. She confronts Margarita and together they witness the monster getting out of the jar. Duke appears briefly before disappearing again. An explosion occurs around the house prompting the two to run around and hide. When the chaos stops, the two try to escape but the door is locked, the remaining maids get consumed by the monster who is now haunting Margarita and Toni in the living room. The two then hide in a room, where Margarita reveals that she was always jealous of Toni's mother. Before Margarita can attack Toni, Duke appears to stop the monster, and asks them to leave the two out of the fight. Margarita, now possessed by the monster, brawls with Toni, who is also possessed by Duke. When Toni gets the upper hand, the monster taunts her to kill her stepmother, but Toni is unwilling and is defeated by her. The monster then tries to stab Toni, but a lightning strikes and defeats her. Toni wakes up to Duke revealing himself to be an angel and not the same Duke as before, he also reveals that everyone consumed by the monster are gone but reminds Toni to remain courteous and he will guide her.

== Cast ==
=== Komiks ===
- Ian De Leon as Cocoy (credited as Kristoffer Ian De Leon)
- Gina Pareño as Cocoy and Anna's mother
- Michael de Mesa as Argonox
- Ruel Vernal as Gorkrah
- Jaime Fabregas as Cocoy and Anna's father (credited as Jimmy Fabregas)
- Monossi Mempin as Nonoy
- Joanne Miller as Anna
- Vicky Suba as Couple Victim
- Jay Ilagan as Couple Victim (uncredited)

=== Halimaw sa Banga ===
- Lotlot de Leon as Toni
- Liza Lorena as Margarita
- Mario O’Hara as Abe
- Maritess Guetirrez as Halimaw
- Mart Kenneth Rebamonte as Emo na Halimaw
- Mary Walter as Grandmother
- Ronnel Victor as Duke
- Marilyn Villamayor as Marlyn
- Romnick Sarmienta as Jericho
- Nora Aunor as Regina, Toni's mother (photo only) (uncredited)
- Tony Angeles as Banga Seller (uncredited)

== Awards ==
At the 1986 Metro Manila Film Festival, the film won 10 awards, including Mario O'Hara for Best Director and Best Actor, and Liza Lorena for Best Actress.

== Legacy ==
The monster and the title itself; 'Halimaw sa Banga' is well known in the Philippines. Often included in list of scariest creatures from Philippine Cinema and mentioned as pop culture reference. The creature appeared in the superhero fantasy teleserye 'Super Inggo' portrayed by Ai-Ai delas Alas.

Matet de Leon, Ian and Lotlot's younger sister, uttered the words "Takot ako, eh!" ("I'm scared, eh!") in the trailer. This phrase is later included in the poster and even produced another horror film in 1987 with Mario O'hara directing again and the three siblings appearing together.
