= Amanda Page =

Filipino former actress

- Born: Anna Liza Macatangay; January 28, 1973 or 1974 (age 51–52)
- Occupation: Actress
- Years active: 1995–2001
- Notable work: Rizal in Dapitan

Anna Liza Macatangay (born January 28, 1973 or 1974), known professionally as Amanda Page, is a Filipino former actress who was active from 1995 to 2001. She won Best Supporting Actress for her role as Josephine Bracken in Rizal sa Dapitan at the Gawad Urian Awards.

== Early life ==
Amanda Page was born Anna Liza Macatangay on January 28, 1973 or 1974 She was born to Filipino parents and grew up and studied in New York. They wanted her to grow up as a doctor who was initially opposed to her career path as an actress.

== Career ==
Known as a "sexy star", Page started her career in 1995. She was a Viva Films actress who appearing in "tiltilating films". She in films such as Gayuma, Sobra Sobra Labis Labis, and Tatsulok.

She also appeared in comedy films, such as Neber 2 Geder, Indecent Professor, Trabaho Lang Dear Walang Personalan, and Strict ang Parents Ko.

She was the lead actress of Phillip Salvador in Bobby Barbers: Parak. Page also starred with Fernando Poe Jr. in the 1996 film Ang Probinsyano where she played the role of Carmen.

Page was named Best Supporting Actress for her role as Josesphine Bracken in Rizal sa Dapitan at the Gawad Urian Award.

In television, Page appeared in the sketch comedy show Bubble Gang which started airing in 1995.

In July 1999, Page filed a libel suit against the Philippine Daily Inquirer for Leah Salterio-Gatdula's October 11, 1998 feature for posting a damaging photo allegedly of Page. The lawsuit was dismissed in 2000 with the court concluding that malice could not be established.

Page retired in 2001. Page in 2025 cites her scandal involving an alleged appearance in a sex video as the reason for her retirement.

== Personal life ==
After retiring from the entertainment industry, Page moved back to the United States. She now lives in Ventura, California with her family.

Page is married to Lee Mendiola since January 2010, a fellow Filipino who works as psychiatrist. They have a son. Page works as an administrator in her husband's clinic in the US.
