= Vigilante (1987 film) =

Philippine action film

- Directed by: Romy Suzara
- Screenplay by: Jose Carreon; Edgardo Reyes
- Story by: Eddie Infante
- Produced by: Romy Suzara
- Starring: Rudy Fernandez
- Cinematography: Ernie dela Paz
- Edited by: Augusto Salvador
- Music by: Jaime Fabregas
- Production company: Greenleaves Productions
- Distributed by: Greenleaves Productions
- Release date: October 22, 1987
- Running time: 105 minutes
- Country: Philippines
- Language: Filipino

Vigilante is a 1987 Philippine action film produced and directed by Romy Suzara. The film stars Rudy Fernandez in the title role.

== Cast ==
- Rudy Fernandez as Noel Pantaleon
- Vic Vargas as Lt. Vergel
- Charo Santos-Concio as Belinda Pantaleon
- Dang Cecilio as Dr. Cristina Elazegui
- Lyka Ugarte as Nellie
- Tina Cruz as Letlet Pantaleon
- Berting Labra as Ponso
- Dencio Padilla as Andoy
- Ruel Vernal as Lt. Resty
- Romy Diaz as Fermin
- Robert Talabis as Ruben
- Zandro Zamora as Zandro
- Renato Robles as Maj. Rosales
- Jaime Fabregas as Don Ramon Sanchez
- Joey Padilla as Philip
- Imelda Ilanan as Lt. Vergel's Wife
- Josie Tagle as Letlet's Yaya
- Pamela Amor as Ponso's Wife
- Mellie Tuazon as Ponso's Daughter
- Benjo as Kidnapped Chinese Boy
- Verna Apolinar Marri as Noel's Secretary
- Pamela Luffman as Lt. Vergel's Daughter
- Jojo Galvez as Lt. Vergel's Son
