= José Rizal (film) =

- Theatrical release poster
- Directed by: Marilou Diaz-Abaya
- Screenplay by: Ricky Lee; Jun Lana; Peter Ong Lim
- Produced by: Butch Jimenez; Jimmy Duavit; Marilou Diaz-Abaya
- Starring: Cesar Montano
- Cinematography: Rody Lacap
- Edited by: Jess Navarro; Manet Dayrit
- Music by: Nonong Buencamino
- Production company: GMA Films
- Distributed by: GMA Films (Note: Currently, the film studio was renamed to GMA Pictures in 2019.)
- Release dates: June 12, 1998 (as part of the Philippine Centennial celebrations); December 25, 1998 (Metro Manila Film Festival)
- Running time: 175 minutes
- Country: Philippines
- Languages: English; Filipino; Spanish; German; French
- Budget: ₱80 million (estimated)
- Box office: ₱125 million

José Rizal is a 1998 Philippine epic historical drama film co-produced and directed by Marilou Diaz-Abaya from a screenplay written by Jun Lana, Ricky Lee, and Peter Ong Lim. The film was based on the true story of Filipino patriot José Rizal, who was imprisoned under the Spanish colonization and tells his story until the final day of his execution. Cesar Montano stars in the title role, with the supporting cast including Jaime Fabregas, Chin-Chin Gutierrez, Gina Alajar, Pen Medina, Gloria Diaz, and Ronnie Lazaro.

At the time of its release, the film was an official entry to the 1998 Metro Manila Film Festival, sweeping most of the nominations with seventeen awards, making it the first film with the most MMFF award wins.

== Plot ==
In 1896, José Rizal was imprisoned in Fort Santiago due to his dissident activities. Meanwhile, in a small field in Balintawak, Andrés Bonifacio and his fellow secret organization, the Katipunan, commence the uprising against the tyranny created by the Spaniards by tearing their cédulas as a sign of freedom from Spanish slavery.

A first lieutenant of the Artillery, Luis Taviel de Andrade, visits Rizal. Taviel de Andrade does not waste time studying Rizal's case carefully. In just a short period, Rizal and Taviel capture each other's sympathy and eventually become friends during their usual meetings in Rizal's cell. Taviel celebrates Christmas with Rizal in the cell where they drink and sing together. Governor General Ramón Blanco also sympathizes with Rizal's cause but is later secretly ousted by corrupt Spanish officials and Manila's archbishop, Bernardino Nozaleda, who replace him with Camilo de Polavieja.

Flashbacks of Rizal's life are shown, from his childhood to his education, and then to his professional life as a doctor. He soon begins writing his two novels Noli Me Tángere and El filibusterismo, which are then published. In addition, key scenes from the two novels are also shown. Returning to the Philippines after a dispute with other Filipino reformists in Madrid, he establishes La Liga Filipina in 1892 and meets Bonifacio, who distinguishes himself as an enthusiastic admirer. Shortly afterwards, he is exiled to Dapitan and spends the next four years working as a doctor, during which he also falls in love with Josephine Bracken, who later gives birth to their stillborn child.

After Christmas of 1896, Rizal was sent to the Real Audiencia, the colonial court of appeal, to hear the trial against him. Despite a passionate defense by Taviel de Andrade, the magistrates decide to condemn him to the firing squad on the morning of December 30 in Luneta. Taviel de Andrade expresses his outrage and shame in front of Rizal, who passively accepts the decision. He is later visited by his family.

On the night before the execution, Rizal has a vision in which he encounters his alter ego—Noli Me Tángere's protagonist Crisostomo Ibarra in his "Simoun" identity, tempting him to change the climax of the novel after Simoun criticizes him as weak. Instead, Rizal writes his last poem "Mi último adiós".

On the morning of his execution, his kin receives a small alcohol stove from his cell containing "Mi último adiós". Stopping at the place of execution facing the rising sun, Rizal requests that the authorities for him to face the firing squad, but the request is denied. Calm and without haste, he requests to have his head spared instead, and the captain agrees. At the moment the firing squad aims at his back, he utters his final words: Consummatum est ("It is finished"). After Rizal collapses from the gunfire, the commanding officer gives him a mercy shot, killing him. The Spaniards in the crowd celebrate, while the Filipinos mourn.

Following Rizal's execution, the Katipunan continues its uprising, with Bonifacio leading an ambush and the revolutionaries killing friars in an act of vengeance. As Bonifacio and his top generals plan new offensives, the camera pans to Rizal's picture on the wall of his headquarters before revealing Rizal's hat, which sat by the shores of Manila Bay, concluding with an epilogue about the revolution and the proclamation of independence in 1898.

== Cast ==
=== Main cast ===
- Cesar Montano as José Rizal
  - Dominic Guinto as young José Rizal
- Chin-Chin Gutierrez as Josephine Bracken
- Mickey Ferriols as Leonor Rivera

=== Rizal's family ===
- Ronnie Lazaro as Francisco Mercado
- Gloria Díaz as Teodora Alonso
- Pen Medina as Paciano Mercado
  - Ping Medina as young Paciano
- Gina Alajar as Saturnina Rizal
- Tanya Gomez as Narcisa Rizal
- Tess Dumpit as María Rizal
- Irma Adlawan as Lucía Rizal
- Angie Castrence as Josefa Rizal
- Rowena Basco as Trinidad Rizal
- Kaye Marie June Congmon as Soledad Rizal

=== The Spaniards ===
- Bon Vibar as Governor-General Ramón Blanco
- Subas Herrero as Lt. Enrique de Alcocer
- Tony Mabesa as Governor-General Camilo de Polavieja
- Alexis Santaren as Col. Francisco Olívè
- Archie Adamos as Col. Olívè's aide
- Ryan Eigenmann as Fernando (Spanish classmate at UST)
- Jaime Fábregas as Luís Taviel de Andrade

=== The Dominicans ===
- Peque Gallaga as Archbishop Bernardino Nozaleda, O.P.
- Tony Carreón as a Dominican friar (Gomburza execution)
- Fritz Infante as a Dominican friar (professor at UST)

=== The Jesuits ===
- Chiqui Xerxes-Burgos as Father José Villaclara, S.J.
- Shelby Payne as Father Estanislao March, S.J.
- Minco Fábregas as Father Francisco de Paula Sanchez, S.J.

=== Other friars ===
- Ogie Juliano as Padre Rodríguez
- Jon Achával as Friar 1
- Cloyd Robinson as Friar 2
- Marco Zabaleta as Friar 3

=== The Filipinos ===
- Jhong Hilario as Rizal's prison servant
- Gardo Versoza as Andrés Bonifacio
- Marco Sison as Pio Valenzuela
- Joel Lamangan as a gobernadorcillo
- Nanding Josef as Antonio Rivera
- Pocholo Montes as Justiniano Aquino Cruz
- Bhey Vito as Don Dorotéo Onjungco
- Kidlat Tahimik as a guest (La Liga Filipina meeting)
- Toto Natividad as a Katipunan benefactor

=== The Filipino propagandists ===
- Dennis Marasigan as Marcelo H. del Pilar
- Mon Confiado as Mariano Ponce
- Gregg de Guzman
- Eddie Aquino
- Manolo Barrientos
- Rolando Inocencio
- Gilbert Onida
- Jim Pebanco
- Troy Martino
- Kokoy Palma
- Richard Merck
- Jess Evardone

=== Noli Me Tángere and El Filibusterismo characters ===
- Joel Torre as Crisóstomo Ibarra/Simoun
- Monique Wilson as María Clara
- Nonie Buencamino as Elías
- Roeder Camañag as Basílio, Oldest son of Sisa
- Richard Quan as Isagani
- Cristóbal Gómez as Padre Damaso

=== Other characters ===
- Jesús Díaz as ophthalmology professor in Spain
- Karl Meyer as a Belgian printer
- LJ Moreno as Josephine Bracken's companion

== Production ==
=== Background ===
In 1994, there were efforts to produce a Hollywood feature film based on the life of José Rizal led by director Cirio H. Santiago, then the head of the Film Development Foundation of the Philippines, with the approval of President Fidel V. Ramos. Actors who were reportedly considered for the project included Andy Garcia as Rizal, Winona Ryder as Josephine Bracken, and Sharon Cuneta as Leonor Rivera, with Jonathan Demme as director, though the project did not come to fruition.

The Malacanang Palace scenes were filmed in the old Rizal Province Capitol building, with the University of Santo Tomas exteriors shot at the former archbishop's palace in Vigan (now an ecclesiastical museum). Rizal's execution was filmed at the shores of Morong, Bataan. All church exteriors were filmed at Saint Mary Magdalene Parish Church in Magdalena, Laguna, while interiors were filmed at Santiago Parish Church in Betis, Guagua, Pampanga.

It was the most expensive film in the history of Filipino cinema with a budget of over ₱80 million.

== Release ==
During the film's release in 1998, the Probe Team, hosted by Che Che Lazaro, produced a special behind-the-scenes documentary titled José Rizal: The Making of a Masterpiece. The documentary highlighted various aspects of the film’s creation, its historical background, and included interviews with the director, cast, producers, members of the production and design team, and other key figures involved in the film.

In 1999, GMA Network released an accompanying publication titled Ang Screenplay ng José Rizal, which featured the original screenplay of the film written by Ricky Lee, Jun Lana, and Peter Ong Lim, along with interviews from the cast, directing crew, and production team.

The film was subsequently released in DVD-format and VCD format by GMA Records Home Video and distributed by Viva Video in 2006.

In 2024, GMA Network digitally restored and remastered the film, in partnership with Central Digital Lab. It was shown to audiences during the 2024 Cinemalaya Philippine Independent Film Festival. The restored version of the movie was released for Netflix on December 30, 2024 to mark Rizal Day.

== Accolades ==
- 1998 Metro Manila Film Festival
  - Best Picture
  - Best Actor (Cesar Montano)
  - Best Director (Marilou Diaz-Abaya)
  - Best Supporting Actor (Jaime Fabregas)
  - Best Supporting Actress (Gloria Diaz)
  - Best Screenplay (Ricky Lee, Jun Lana and Peter Ong Lim)
  - Best Original Story (Ricky Lee, Jun Lana and Peter Ong Lim)
  - Best Cinematography (Rody Lacap)
  - Best Editing (Jess Navarro and Manet Dayrit)
  - Best Sound Production (Mike Idioma)
  - Best Production Design (Leo Abaya)
  - Best Special Effects (Mark Ambat of Optima Digital)
  - Best Makeup (Denni Yrastorza Tan)
  - Best Musical Score (Nonong Buencamino)
  - Best Movie Theme Song (Nonong Buencamino for "Awit ni Maria Clara")
  - Best Festival Float
  - Gatpuno Antonio J. Villegas Cultural Awards
- 1999 FAMAS Awards
  - Best Picture
  - Best Actor (Cesar Montano)
  - Best Director (Marilou Diaz-Abaya)
  - Best Supporting Actor (Jaime Fabregas)
  - Best Cinematography (Rody Lacap)
  - Best Editing (Jess Navarro and Manet A. Dayrit)
  - Best Movie Theme Song (Nonong Buencamino for "Awit ni Maria Clara")
  - Best Musical Direction (Nonong Buencamino)
  - Best Production Design (Leo Abaya)
  - Best Screenplay (Ricardo Lee, Jun Lana, and Peter Ong Lim)
  - Best Special Effects (Rolando Santo Domingo)
- 1999 Gawad Urian Awards
  - Best Direction (Marilou Diaz-Abaya)
  - Best Cinematography (Rody Lacap)
  - Best Music (Nonong Buencamino)
  - Best Production Design (Leo Abaya)
  - Best Sound (Albert Michael Idioma)
  - Best Supporting Actor (Jaime Fabregas)
- 1999 Star Awards for Movies
  - Movie of the Year
  - Actor of the Year (Cesar Montano)
  - Director of the Year (Marilou Diaz-Abaya)
  - Supporting Actor of the Year (Jaime Fabregas)
  - Adapted Screenplay of the Year (Ricardo Lee, Jun Lana, and Peter Ong Lim)
  - Editor of the Year (Jess Navarro and Manet A. Dayrit)
  - Musical Scorer of the Year (Nonong Buencamino)
  - Production Designer of the Year (Leo Abaya)
  - Sound Engineering of the Year (Albert Michael Idioma)

The film was screened and run in competition in different film festivals worldwide and included in the Official Selection for Panorama at the Berlin International Film Festival (1998). It also won 2nd runner-up in the Audience Award of the Toronto Filmfest and the Chicago International Film Festival.

== See also ==
- Bayaning 3rd World
- Rizal sa Dapitan
- Propaganda Movement
- Philippine Revolution
