= Taray at Teroy =

1988 comedy film starring Maricel Soriano, Randy Santiago

- Official movie poster
- Directed by: Pablo P. Santiago
- Written by: Tony David
- Starring: Maricel Soriano; Randy Santiago; Barbara Perez; Nova Villa; Nadia Montenegro; Jimmy Fabregas; Beverly Salviejo; The Hawi Boys
- Cinematography: Alfonso Alvarez
- Edited by: Efren Jarlego
- Music by: Jimmy Fabregas
- Production company: Regal Films
- Release date: February 25, 1988
- Running time: 115 minutes
- Country: Philippines
- Language: Filipino

Taray at Teroy (lit. 'Taray and Teroy') is a 1988 Filipino romantic comedy film directed by Pablo Santiago. It stars Maricel Soriano and Santiago's son Randy Santiago as the respective titular characters, alongside Barbara Perez, Nova Villa, Jimmy Fabregas, Beverly Salviejo, Esther Chavez, and Nadia Montenegro. Produced by Regal Films, the film was released on February 25, 1988.

Critic Luciano E. Soriano of the Manila Standard gave the film a negative review, criticizing it as "[s]hallow and hollow" and "strictly attuned for the fans of the two lead stars".

== Plot ==
Estela "Taray" Caluglog is a stern and faultfinding provincial girl who travels to the city to prepare her papers to become a domestic helper in Singapore. Once a sunglasses-wearing boy named Teroy accidentally bumps Taray with his motorcycle, Taray angrily chases after him with her switchblade. As further hijinks ensue, the two get to know each other and eventually fall in love.

== Cast ==
Main cast

- Maricel Soriano as Estela "Taray" Caluglog
- Randy Santiago as Terry (nicknamed "Teroy")

Supporting cast

- Barbara Perez
- Nova Villa as Cora
- Jimmy Fabregas as Caloy
- Beverly Salviejo as Tiburcia Imburnal
- Esther Chavez
- Nadia Montenegro as Marita
- Chito Alcid
- Via Nueva
- Reena Kuan
- Sheila Israel
- Jeanne Prospero
- Candy Cruz
- Harvy Vizcarra
- Feling Cudia
- Joseph Sera
- The Hawi Boys
- Jong Cuenco
- Dennis Padilla
- Willie Katigbak
- Emer Guingon
- Ferdie Tan
- Marvie Mendoza
- Bobby Rosales
- Arnel Apeja

== Release ==
Taray at Teroy was released in theaters on February 25, 1988. The film was released four days after Regal Films executive Lily Monteverde organized a birthday concert for Maricel Soriano at the Araneta Coliseum, broadcast live through IBC; Soriano's co-star Randy Santiago served as one of the emcees at the concert.

=== Critical response ===
Luciano E. Soriano of the Manila Standard gave the film a negative review, criticizing it as "[s]hallow and hollow" for its timeworn romantic plot and the disconnect between the characters' personalities and the comedic situations they are in. He also criticized Soriano's "mataray" (stern and faultfinding) performance as more irritating than funny, as well as the superficial characterization of the Marita character whose sole purpose is to provide a love triangle to the story. However, he commended Fabregas' "irrepressible" performance as Caloy, the lovestruck uncle of Teroy, which "saves this role from disaster". Soriano concluded that "this film is strictly attuned for the fans of the two lead stars...."
