= Pablo Santiago (director) =

Filipino filmmaker (1931–1998)

- Born: June 20, 1931
- Died: August 16, 1998 (aged 67); Manila Memorial Park, Parañaque City
- Occupations: Film director; producer; screenwriter
- Years active: 1956–1996
- Notable work: Batang Quiapo; Batingaw; Perlas ng Silangan; Ibong Adarna; Digmaan ng mga Angkan; Agila ng Maynila; Kahit Konting Pagtingin
- Spouse: Cielito Legaspi-Santiago
- Children: Rowell Santiago; Randy Santiago; Raymart Santiago

Pablo P. Santiago (June 20, 1931 – August 16, 1998) was a Filipino film director, producer and screenwriter.

== Career ==
Santiago was known for his big-budget action films, most of which starred Fernando Poe Jr. in the lead role. In 1956, his directorial career began with the film, Lo' Waist Gang, which was also Poe's breakout film.

For five decades, Santiago produced award-winning films such as Batingaw , Nueva Vizcaya , Perlas ng Silangan, Ibong Adarna and Digmaan ng Mga Angkan.

His last film as director was Ang Syota Kong Balikbayan, starred Poe and Anajette Abayari in 1996.

== Personal life ==
Santiago was married to actress Cielito Legaspi-Santiago known as "Mama Ling", his wife of 39 years. They have six children: Randy Santiago, Rowell Santiago, Rhea Santiago, Jun-Jun Santiago, Raymart Santiago and Chi-Chi Santiago.

Four of his children also joined the entertainment industry: Randy Santiago, a singer and television host, Rowell Santiago, an actor and film director, Raymart Santiago, an action star, and Jun-Jun Santiago worked as a line producer for Star Cinema.

Santiago passed away on August 16, 1998. His funeral was held at the Santuario de San Jose in Greenhills, San Juan City . On August 22, 1998, he was buried at the Manila Memorial Park in Sucat, Parañaque City.

His wife, Cielito Legaspi-Santiago died of penumonia in September 2014.

== Filmography ==
=== As director ===
- 1956 – Lo' Waist Gang
- 1957 – Ukelele Boy
- 1957 – Bakasyon Grande
- 1957 – Los Lacuacheros
- 1958 – Lutong Makaw
- 1958 – Mga Liham kay Tiya Dely
- 1958 – Ang Lo' Waist Gang at si Og sa Mindoro
- 1959 – Sumpa at Pangako
- 1960 – Rancho Grande
- 1960 – Lo' Waist Gang Joins the Armed Forces
- 1960 – Gabi ng Lagim
- 1960 – Walang Daigdig
- 1960 – Big Time Berto
- 1961 – Nagsasalitang Kalansay
- 1961 – Asiong Salonga
- 1961 – Nag-uumpugang Bato
- 1962 – Walang Pagkalupig
- 1962 – Gorio and His Jeepney
- 1963 – Pinakamagandang Hayop sa Daigdig
- 1963 – Istambay
- 1963 – Pulong Diablo
- 1964 – The Nite Owl
- 1964 – Kumander Fidela
- 1964 – Let's Go
- 1964 – DJ Dance Time
- 1965 – Danilo Ronquillo: Cavite Boy
- 1965 – Dandansoy
- 1965 – Salonga Brothers
- 1966 – Let's Do the Freddie
- 1966 – Katapat ng Bawat Lakas
- 1966 – Batang Iwahig
- 1967 – Yesterday
- 1967 – Umpisahan Mo... at Tatapusin Ko!
- 1967 – Let's Hang On (Discotheque)
- 1967 – Metrocom
- 1968 – Quintin Salazar
- 1968 – Operation: Discotheque
- 1968 – Mine Hunter
- 1968 – Let's Go Hippie
- 1968 – Jeepney King
- 1968 – Barbaro Cristobal
- 1968 – Ang Mangliligpit
- 1969 – Perlas ng Silangan
- 1969 – Nardong Kutsero
- 1969 – Batang Matadero
- 1970 – Ang Matitinik
- 1970 – Tierra... Sangre
- 1970 – Bagsik ng Kamao
- 1970 – Zoom-Zoom
- 1970 – Dampot... Pukol... Salo!
- 1971 – Micaela
- 1971 – Adios Mi Amor
- 1971 – Digmaan ng Mga Angkan
- 1971 – Kami'y Nagkasala
- 1971 – Divina Bastarda
- 1971 – Ang Kampana sa Santa Quiteria
- 1971 – Apat Na Patak ng Dugo ni Adan
- 1972 – Florante at Laura
- 1972 – Salaginto't Salagubang
- 1972 – Rockfest '72
- 1972 – Blood Compact
- 1973 – Ang Hiwaga ng Ibong Adarna
- 1973 – Nueva Vizcaya
- 1973 – Ako'y Paru-paro, Bulaklak Naman Ako
- 1974 – Batingaw
- 1974 – Pinoy Crazy Boys
- 1974 – Batya't Palu-palo
- 1974 – South Seas
- 1975 – Hit and Run
- 1975 – Vilma Veinte Nueve
- 1976 – Ang Erpat Kong Groovy
- 1976 – Big Ike's Happening
- 1976 – Iniibig Kita... Father Salvador
- 1976 – Bato sa Buhangin
- 1977 – Ang Diwata
- 1977 – Bontoc
- 1977 – Little Christmas Tree
- 1978 – Kumander Ulupong
- 1978 – Camerino
- 1979 – Mabango Ba ang Bawat Bulaklak
- 1979 – Kasal-kasalan, Bahay-bahayan
- 1980 – Six Million Centavo Man
- 1980 – Wander Woman si Ako!
- 1981 – Sierra Madre
- 1981 – Sambahin ang Ngalan Mo
- 1981 – Bandido sa Sapang Bato
- 1982 – Pepeng Kaliwete
- 1982 – Annie Sabungera
- 1982 – Manedyer... si Kumander
- 1982 – Daniel Bartolo ng Sapang Bato
- 1982 – Bad Boy from Dadiangas
- 1983 – Kapag Buhay ang Inutang
- 1983 – JR
- 1984 – Sigaw ng Katarungan
- 1984 – Sierra Madre
- 1985 – Isa-isa Lang!
- 1986 – Iyo ang Tondo, Kanya ang Cavite
- 1986 – Ninja Kids
- 1986 – Batang Quiapo
- 1987 – Operation: Get Victor Corpus, the Rebel Soldier
- 1987 - Feliciano Luces: Alyas Kumander Toothpick, Mindanao
- 1987 – No Retreat... No Surrender... Si Kumander
- 1988 – Taray at Teroy
- 1988 – Alyas Pusa: Ang Taong May 13 Buhay
- 1988 – Buy One, Take One
- 1988 – One Day, Isang Araw
- 1988 – Agila ng Maynila
- 1989 – Wanted: Pamilya Banal (as Pablo P. Santiago)
- 1990 – Kahit Konting Pagtingin
- 1990 – Hindi Ka Na Sisikatan ng Araw: Kapag Puno Na ang Salop Part-III
- 1990 – May Isang Tsuper ng Taxi
- 1992 – Dito sa Pitong Gatang
- 1992 – Jaime Labrador: Sakristan Mayor
- 1993 – Anak ng Pasig
- 1994 – Ikaw lamang, Wala Nang Iba
- 1996 – Ang Syota Kong Balikbayan

=== As screenwriter ===
- 1958 – Ang Lo' Waist Gang at si Og sa Mindoro
- 1960 – Gabi ng Lagim
- 1960 – True Confessions
- 1961 – Nag-uumpugang Bato
- 1963 – Pulong Diablo
- 1964 – Mga Kanang Kamay (story)
- 1987 – Family Tree (story)
- 1992 – Jamie Labrador: Sakristan Mayor

=== As producer ===
- 1966 – Let's Do the Freddie
- 1967 – Yesterday
- 1967 – Metrocom
- 1968 – Quintin Salazar (as executive producer)
- 1974 – South Seas
- 1980 – Six Million Centavo Man
- 1982 – Annie Sabungera

== Awards ==
Year	Award	Category	Work	Result	Ref.
FAMAS Award	1962	Best Director	Nag-uumpugang Bato	Nominated	
FAMAS Award	1963	Best Director	Walang Pagkalupig	Nominated	
FAMAS Award	1965	Best Director	Kumander Fidela	Nominated	
FAMAS Award	1969	Best Director	Barbaro Cristobal	Nominated	
FAMAS Award	1974	Best Director	Nueva Vizcaya	Nominated	
FAMAS Award	1975	Best Director	Batingaw	Nominated	
FAMAS Award	1978	Best Director	Bontoc	Nominated	
FAMAS Award	1989	Best Director	Kasal-kasalan, Bahay-bahayan	Nominated	
