= Ang Syota Kong Balikbayan =

1995 Philippine action comedy film by Pablo Santiago

- Directed by: Pablo P. Santiago
- Screenplay by: Pablo S. Gomez; Manuel Buising; Jaime Fabregas
- Story by: Pablo S. Gomez
- Produced by: Fernando Poe Jr.
- Starring: Fernando Poe Jr.; Anjanette Abayari
- Edited by: Augusto Salvador; Rene Tala
- Music by: Jaime Fabregas
- Production company: FPJ Productions
- Distributed by: Viva Films
- Release date: November 29, 1995
- Running time: 118 minutes
- Country: Philippines
- Language: Filipino

Ang Syota Kong Balikbayan (English: My Girlfriend, the Returnee) is a 1995 Philippine romantic action comedy film directed by Pablo Santiago and written by Pablo S. Gomez, Manuel Buising, and Jaime Fabregas, from a story by Gomez. It stars Fernando Poe Jr. and Anjanette Abayari in the lead roles. The word balikbayan (literally "return to the homeland") refers to members of the Filipino diaspora who return to or visit the Philippines.

Produced by FPJ Productions and distributed by Viva Films, the film was released theatrically on November 29, 1995.

== Plot ==
Cathy returns from the US to pursue a modeling career and donate her inherited property to her tenants in accordance with her grandmother's wishes. She meets with her uncle Facundo, who tells her that he intends to sell off the property, of which he has a share, and asks for her permission, which she refuses. On her way to live with her aunt Agnes and cousin Tino/Tina in the working-class community that has sprung up at the property, she rear-ends a jeepney driven by Nanding, leading to an argument, which is complicated by the fact that Nanding cannot understand Cathy's English. Cathy charms the police into having Nanding jailed.

While jogging a few days later, Cathy encounters Nanding, who has been bailed out by his friends and turns out to be living in the same neighborhood as she. Cathy gets into another argument with him, which is frustrated again by the language barrier. While driving shortly afterwards, Nanding again runs into Cathy, who has gotten into another car accident. Seeing her being bullied by the occupants of the car she hit, he fights them off. Cathy's attitude towards him changes, and after Tino/Tina tells her that Nanding is actually a good-hearted person, she resolves to make amends.

Tino/Tina arranges for the two to meet, with Cathy apologizing to Nanding in Filipino. Over dinner, Nanding and Cathy bond, along with Tino/Tina and Nanding's friend Steve. As they leave to fetch a group of club workers led by Digna, they unknowingly transport diamonds stolen by criminals Frankie and Maxie, who had hidden their loot inside Nanding's parked jeepney. Arriving at the club, Cathy arouses Digna's jealousy, leading the latter to kiss Nanding in front of Cathy. After learning that Nanding has no feelings for Digna, Cathy accompanies Nanding in fetching Digna at the club and kisses him in front of her before walking off.

Jogging once more, Cathy gets into a brawl with Digna, which is stopped by Nanding. A furious Digna ends her ties with Nanding and contacts Facundo, who conspires to force Cathy to sign the property over to him. Nanding, seeking to cool off tensions after the brawl, serenades Cathy with the help of Janno Gibbs and Randy Santiago. Cathy falls in love with Nanding and tells him of her intent to grant the property to their community. Digna, pretending to make amends with Cathy, lures her to her house, where she has hired a goon to rape her. However, Cathy notices Digna spiking her drink and escapes. On the run, she finds Nanding and embraces him.

Facundo and Digna arrange for Cathy to be abducted by goons led by Frankie and Maxie and held until she signs away her rights to the property, after which she is to be killed. However, their hideout, an old and abandoned mansion, turns out to be haunted, and at midnight, monsters and vampires kill the goons one by one, until only Frankie and Maxie are left. Nanding, informed of what happened by Tino/Tina, arrives at the mansion with Steve and rescues Cathy after fighting off the monsters. Frankie and Maxie also escape and run into Facundo and Digna on the road. Realizing that their plan has failed, Facundo and Digna flee and leave Frankie and Maxie behind to be arrested. Arriving at his garage, Nanding is accosted by a gang of robbers, whose leader seeks revenge on him for a failed heist he was involved in. Cathy, Steve, Nanding, and his fellow jeepney drivers beat up the gang. Cathy finalizes the donation of the land, while Nanding finds the diamonds hidden in his jeepney and receives a reward.

In their prison cell, Frankie and Maxie are attacked by a vampire from the mansion.

== Cast ==
Main

- Fernando Poe Jr. as Nanding, a tough but kind jeepney driver
- Anjanette Abayari as Cathy, a Filipino-American returnee ("balikbayan") who stumbles her way around Manila and falls in love with Nanding after initially disliking him
- Maritoni Fernandez as Digna, a club worker who is a rival of Cathy for Nanding's affections and schemes with Don Facundo to get rid of her
- Paquito Diaz as Frankie, a professional criminal
- Max Alvarado as Maxie, Frankie's companion in crime
- Dencio Padilla as Steve, Nanding's friend from the jeepney garage
- Romy Diaz as Johnny, a gang leader who seeks revenge on Nanding after he prevented their escape from a robbery, leading to his brother succumbing to injuries he sustained in the heist
- Boy Alano as Tino/Tina, Cathy's transgender cousin
- Jaime Fabregas as Don Facundo, Cathy's uncle, who schemes to have the property he co-owns with her sold to a foreign investor
- Doreen Bernal as Agnes, Cathy's aunt and host during her stay in Manila

Guest

- Chiquito as Greg/Gorio, a former president of Nanding's jeepney group who claims to be living rich but is revealed to be a chauffeur
- Janno Gibbs as himself
- Randy Santiago as himself
- German Moreno as Sgt. Azuela, a police station clerk who books Nanding after his altercation with Cathy
- Dexter Doria as Delia, a woman who is robbed of diamonds by Frankie and Maxie
