= Eseng ng Tondo =

Philippine biographical action film

- Directed by: Ronwaldo Reyes; Augusto Salvador
- Screenplay by: Pablo S. Gomez; Manuel Buising
- Produced by: Fernando Poe Jr.
- Starring: Fernando Poe Jr.
- Cinematography: Ver Reyes
- Edited by: Augusto Salvador
- Music by: Jaime Fabregas
- Production company: FPJ Productions
- Distributed by: Viva Films
- Release date: July 16, 1997
- Running time: 112 minutes
- Country: Philippines
- Language: Filipino

Eseng ng Tondo (lit. Eseng of Tondo) is a 1997 Philippine biographical action film directed by Fernando Poe Jr. (who produced the film) under the moniker Ronwaldo Reyes and Augusto Salvador (who edited the film). The film, based on the life of Lt. Eusebio Natividad, known as Eseng 45, stars Poe as the titular policeman.

== Plot ==
Lt. Eusebio Natividad, known as Eseng 45, is known for his honesty, fair judgment and incredible marksmanship, which wins him admirers, but also earns him enemies who want him dead. His encounter with various women who usually serve as his informers, such as Elvie, who owns a nightclub, earns the jealousy of his wife Digna.

== Cast ==
- Fernando Poe Jr. as P/Lt. Eusebio "Eseng" Natividad
- Ina Raymundo as Elvie
- Jenny Syquia as Digna
- Chuck Perez as Dado
- Mandy Ochoa as Chito

== Production ==
The film was edited by Augusto Salvador, a frequent collaborator of Poe Jr.
