= Ang Probinsyano (film) =

1996 Filipino film directed by Ronwaldo Reyes

- Theatrical film poster
- Directed by: Ronwaldo Reyes
- Screenplay by: Pablo S. Gomez; Manny R. Buising
- Story by: Ronwaldo Reyes
- Produced by: FPJ; Susan V. Tagle
- Starring: Fernando Poe Jr.
- Cinematography: Ver P. Reyes
- Edited by: Augusto Salvador; Rene Tala
- Music by: Jaime Fabregas
- Production company: FPJ Productions
- Distributed by: Viva Films
- Release date: October 16, 1996
- Running time: 118 minutes
- Country: Philippines
- Language: Filipino
- Box office: ₱60 million

FPJ's Ang Probinsyano (lit. 'The Provincial Man') is a 1996 Filipino action film co-written, directed and produced by Fernando Poe Jr., who also stars in twin lead roles. The film was a box office hit. A sequel, Pagbabalik ng Probinsyano, was released in 1998.

== Plot ==
Police Captain Ador de Leon is killed in a drug bust operation after he is betrayed by his fellow officer Major Sandoval. His superior, Colonel Bernardo, lies to Ador's wife Lily, telling her that he is severely injured, and devises a plan for his twin brother, Lieutenant Ricardo "Kardo" de León, who is the Chief of Police in the distant provincial town of Santa Marcela, to assume Ador's identity. Kardo cut contact with Ador after the death of his family, who were mistaken for Ador's, in a massacre. Kardo arrives at Ador's house, and is received by a relieved Lily who believes him to be her husband. However, Kardo later slips up, forcing him and Colonel Bernardo to reveal the truth to Lily, who eventually forgives them.

At a club frequented by Ador and other policemen, Kardo meets Carmen, a dancer, and gets to know her and her daughter Menchie, who grows fond of him. Knowing that Kardo is already suspecting him for Ador's death, Sandoval dispatches two corrupt policemen to hold Carmen and Menchie hostage and lure Kardo into her house to kill him. Arriving at the house, Carmen, who is terminally ill with brain cancer, sacrifices herself in order to save Menchie and Kardo, who kills the two policemen. Sandoval is suspended after his role is revealed, while Menchie chooses to live with Kardo.

Kardo eventually finds the truth about his brother's death and launches an assault on the drug syndicate responsible, killing Sandoval. Afterwards, Kardo returns to Santa Marcela with Menchie.

== Cast ==
- Fernando Poe Jr. as Police Captain Ador de Leon and Police Lieutenant Ricardo "Kardo" de Leon
- Dindi Gallardo as Lily de Leon
- Amanda Page as Carmen Salazar
- Amado Cortez as Police Colonel Bernardo
- Melisse "Mumay" Santiago as Menchie Salazar
- Janus del Prado as Jerry de Leon
- Bob Soler as Head of the Syndicate
- Zandro Zamora as Police Major Sandoval
- Berting Labra as Titong
- Jerick Miranda as Ben
- Marita Zobel as Mrs. Bernardo
- Rudy Meyer
- Vic Varrion
- Joey Padilla as Ben's gang
- Nonoy de Guzman as Nonong Noo
- Jim Rosales as Santos' gang
- Rene Matias as Santos
- Robert Rivera as Police Senior Master Sergeant Halili
- Dante Castro as Investigation Officer
- Dindo Arroyo as Dado
- Renato del Prado as Natong Luga
- Ernie Zarate as Investigation Officer
- Telly Babasa as Alex
- Tom Olivar as Alex's goon
- Ding Alvaro as Alex's goon
- Kim Laurel as Alex's goon
- Tom Alvarez

== Sequel ==
A sequel, Pagbabalik ng Probinsyano, was released almost a year and a half later, directly after the success of the original.

== Remake ==
In 2015, the film was remade by ABS-CBN as a teleserye starring Coco Martin together with an ensemble cast.

=== Deviations and connections to the TV series ===
- In the film version, Kardo (Cardo in the television series) has a wife and children, who were murdered because the killers had mistaken Kardo for Ador. In the TV series, he was adopted by the Dalisay family. Hence, Kardo's last name in the film version is de Leon instead of Dalisay.
- Ador's guilt is the reason for his and Kardo's separation in the film version. In the TV series version, their grandmother had young Cardo adopted by a childless couple as a condition for the treatment of Cardo's injuries in Singapore.
- Ador and Kardo did not have a living grandmother in the film. In the TV series, the twins have a grandmother played by veteran actress Susan Roces, widow of the late Fernando Poe Jr.
- Cardo in the TV series is a Special Armed Forces trooper in Botolan with the rank of Staff Sergeant (PO3). In the film version, Kardo is Santa Marcela's Police Chief, with the rank of Lieutenant.
- The film's antagonist is a drug syndicate. In the TV series, it is a human-child trafficking syndicate whose line of business shifted to drug production and distribution.
- The child Kardo adopts in the film is a girl, while in the TV series, it is a boy. Later, Cardo and his family would adopt five more children as part of his expanded family.
- In the film, Ador's son is named Jerry; while in the TV series, he names his son after him.
- Carmen, a love interest in both the film and the TV series is presented differently between the two versions. In the former, Carmen is a night club entertainer and the mother of Menchie, the child whom Kardo adopts; whereas in the latter, Carmen is the widow of Ador, replacing the film's Lily as Ador's wife.
- Salazar is the surname of the film version's Carmen. In the TV series, Guzman is Carmen's maiden name before she married Ador.
- The Glen Corpuz character was originally created for the TV series only.
- Ador's superior in the film version, who devised the plan for Kardo to assume Ador's identity, is not Ador and Kardo's grand-uncle.
- The person who killed Ador in the film version is a syndicate goon. In the TV series, Ador is killed by the main antagonist, a corrupt policeman.
- In the film, the main antagonist is a corrupt police official under the payroll of the drug syndicate. In contrast, the main antagonist in the TV series is a corrupt police officer who is one of the leaders and a family member of the human trafficking and drug syndicate.
- The Paloma Picache character was created for the TV series only, and was an idea proposed by lead actor Coco Martin to Dreamscape Entertainment. Paloma is actually Cardo in drag which he used to infiltrate a prostitution ring and a sextortionist group.
- Janus del Prado, Tom Olivar, Dindo Arroyo, and Joey Padilla were the cast members from the 1996 film who made guest appearances in the TV series. In addition, Daniel Fernando, Ricardo Cepeda, and Jethro Ramirez, who were part of the 1998 film sequel, also made guest appearances in the telenovela. Jaime Fabregas, who served as the musical director for both the film and its sequel, played the role of Cardo and Ador's superior and grand uncle. Likewise, Manny Q. Palo, the writer of the screenplay for the sequel, went on to become one of the directors of the show.
- The conflicts of the film and its sequel are both explored and expanded at different points in the television series. Whilst drug syndicates remain the overarching conflict in the show and eventually escalate to international cartels, illegal mining is also briefly explored in the third season and an accompanying major conflict in the sixth season.

== Re-release ==
A special tribute screening of the film was held In August 2015, in celebration of Poe's 76th birthday and ahead of the premiere of the TV adaptation. The screening was attended by Poe's widow, Susan Roces, their daughter, Senator Grace Poe and her son, Brian Llamanzares, along with the cast of the series Coco Martin, Maja Salvador, Bela Padilla and Jaime Fabregas who also served as the film's musical director.
