= Lacaba =

Lacaba is a surname. Notable people with the surname include:

- Emmanuel Lacaba (1948–1976), Filipino writer
- Pete Lacaba (born 1945), Filipino screenwriter
