= 1980 FAMAS Awards =

29th edition of Filipino movie awards

29th FAMAS Awards
- Date: 1980
- Site: Manila Midtown Ramada

Highlights
- Best Picture: Jaguar
- Most awards: Durugin si Totoy Bato(5 wins)

The 29th Filipino Academy of Movie Arts and Sciences Awards Night was held in 1980 at Manila Midtown Ramada, Philippines. This recognized outstanding achievements in the different films released in the year 1979.

Durugin si Totoy Bato of FPJ Productions was the most awarded film of the 28th FAMAS Awards with 5 wins. However, it failed to win the FAMAS Award for Best Picture. Jaguar won the awards for Best Picture and Best Director. Nora Aunor won Best Actress for her film Ina Ka ng Anak Mo, while Fernando Poe Jr. won Best Actor.

Jaguar was also entered into competition for the Palme d'Or at the 1980 Cannes Film Festival.

== Awards ==
=== Major awards ===
Winners are listed first and highlighted with boldface.

Best Picture	Best Director
**Jaguar — Bancom Audiovision**; Durugin si Totoy Bato — FPJ Productions; Huwag, Bayaw — Seven Wonders Productions; Ina Ka ng Anak Mo — Premiere Productions; Ang Lihim ng Guadalupe — FPJ Productions	**Lino Brocka— Jaguar**; Armando A. Herrera — Durugin si Totoy Bato; Manuel "Fyke" Cinco — Huwag, Bayaw; Pablo Santiago — Kasal-Kasalan, Bahay-Bahayan; Robert Arevalo — Sino'ng Pipigil sa Pagpakat ng Ulan
Best Actor	Best Actress
**Fernando Poe Jr. — Durugin si Totoy Bato as Totoy Bato**; Christopher De Leon — Ang Alamat ni Julian Makabayan as Julian Makabayan; Anthony Alonzo — Dakpin si Junior Bombay! as Junior Bombay; Ernie Garcia — Pagmamahal Mo Buhay Ko; Rudy Fernandez — Star	**Nora Aunor — Ina Ka ng Anak Mo as Esther**; Vilma Santos — Halik sa Paa, Halik sa Kamay as Christine; Beth Bautista — Huwag, Bayaw; Charito Solis — Ina, Kapatid, Anak as Emilia; Liza Lorena — Gabun
Best Supporting Actor	Best Supporting Actress
**Leroy Salvador — Init**; Johnny Delgado — Ang Alamat ni Julian Makabayan; Paquito Diaz — Durugin si Totoy Bato; Menggie Cobarrubias — Jaguar as Sonny Gaston; Vic Silayan — Star	**Perla Bautista — Ang Alamat ni Julian Magabayan**; Laurice Guillen — Init; Rebecca Gonzales — Kasal-Kasalan, Bahay-Bahayan; Rustica Carpio — Menor de Edad; Rita Gomez — Salawahan
Best Child Actor	Best Child Actress
**Bentot Jr. — Ang Lihim ng Guadalupe**; Niño Muhlach — Kuwatog; Rapp Rivera — Mahal Kong Taksil; Hero Bautista — Roberta; Bongchi Miraflor — Salawahan	**Julie Vega — Durugin si Totoy Bato as Lucia**; Crystal — Huwag, Bayaw
Best in Screenplay	Best Story
**Eddie Romero & Fred Navarro — Durugin si Totoy Bato**	**Carlo J. Caparas — Durugin si Totoy Bato**; Letecia Fariñas — Ina Ka ng Anak Mo
Best Sound	Best Musical Score
**Rudy Baldovino — Ang Lihim ng Guadalupe**	**George Canseco — Huwag, Bayaw**
Best Cinematography	Best Production Design
**Ben Lobo — Ang Lihim ng Guadalupe**	**Napoleon Enriquez — Ang Lihim ng Guadalupe**
Best Editing	Best Theme Song
**Ben Barcelon — Durugin si Totoy Bato**	**George Canseco — Huwag Bayaw**; Pablo Vergara — Mahal... Ginagabi Ka Na Naman

=== Special awards ===
- **Dr. Ciriaco Santiago Memorial Award**
  - **Jesse Ejercito**
- **Lou Salvador, Sr. Memorial Award**
  - **Levi Celerio**
- **Dr. Jose Perez Memorial Award**
  - **Boots Anson-Roa**
- **Gregorio Valdez Memorial Award**
  - **Eddie Garcia**
- **Posthumous Awards**
  - José Padilla Jr.
  - Canuplin
  - Patsy
  - Clodualdo del Mundo Sr.
  - Norberto Amoranto
- **Hall of Fame Awardee**
  - Augusto Buenaventura - Screenplay
    - 1977 - Bakya Mo Neneng
    - 1973 - Erap Is My Guy
    - 1972 - Kill the Pushers
    - 1970 - Psycho Sex Killer
    - 1957 - Kalibre .45
