= Angela Markado =

Angela Markado may refer to:

- Angela Markado (1980 film), a Philippine crime drama film
- Angela Markado (2015 film), a Filipino revenge action thriller film, a remake of the above
