= AMIHAN =

Filipino agrarian reform advocacy group

- AMIHAN–National Federation of Peasant Women
- AMIHAN–Pambansang Pederasyon ng Kababaihang Magbubukid
- Formation: October 26, 1986; 39 years ago
- Headquarters: Quezon City
- Chairperson: Zenaida Soriano
- Secretary General: Catalina "Cathy" Estavillo
- Affiliations: Bagong Alyansang Makabayan, Kilusang Magbubukid ng Pilipinas
- Website: amihanwomen.org

The AMIHAN-National Federation of Peasant Women (Filipino: AMIHAN–Pambansang Pederasyon ng Kababaihang Magbubukid) is a national Filipino organization of peasant women and peasant women organizations advocating for genuine agrarian reform and women's rights, especially in the countryside. The organization works in campaigning and advocacy, organizational building and leader development, research and education, and local and international solidarity.

The organization is an affiliate of the Kilusang Magbubukid ng Pilipinas.

== History ==
The organization was established on October 26, 1986, with six provincial chapters. It has expanded into nineteen provincial chapters in nine regions. AMIHAN was formed to give a collective response through advocacy for the welfare of women in the agricultural sector, with an organization headed and participated in by women, to fully participate in peasant struggles and break free from misogynistic stereotypes depicting women as weak and submissive. It is named for amihan or the northeast wind, associated with women.

As of 2023, the organization had expanded to 35 chapters with almost 14,000 active members.

== Advocacy ==
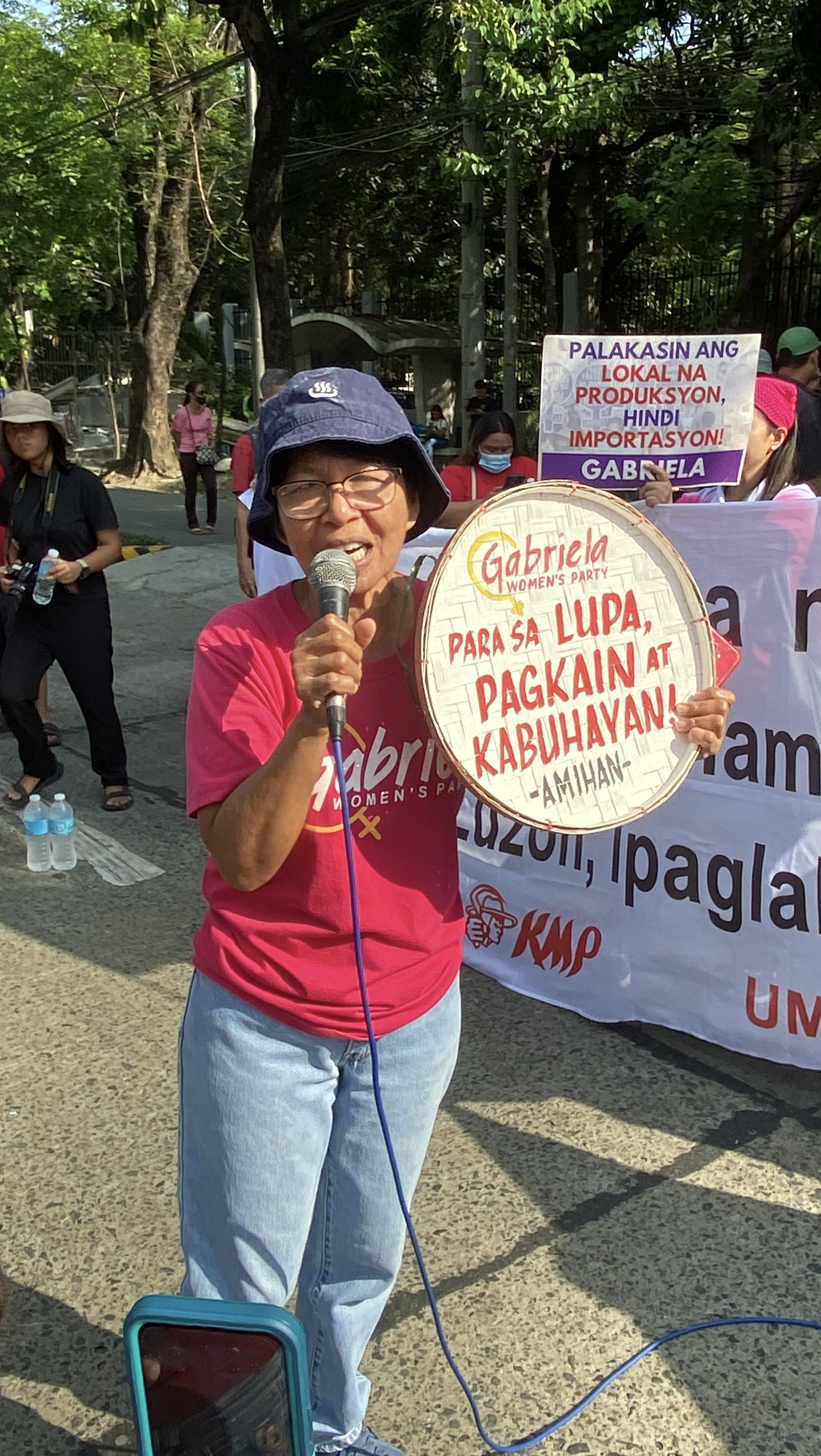
Secretary-General Cathy Estavillo speaking at a peasants' rally, 2025

The organization focuses on Philippine peasant women, which is said to be the largest sector of women in the country. The agricultural sector faces deep poverty, where seven out of ten farmers in the Philippines have remained landless, and there are related issues such as workers' rights and equality. The group claims that peasant women have not been recognized by government authorities. In 2021, the average wage gap between peasant men and women was ₱30, according to studies by the Philippine Statistics Authority. Additionally, peasant women face the struggle of breaking free from traditional gender norms, as they have usually have been given roles such as serving or cooking. The sector also faces red-tagging, harassment, and other human rights violations.

In serving peasant communities, AMIHAN has led campaigns for free land distribution, production support for farmers and fisherfolk, post-calamity rehabilitation, food security and self-sufficiency, and opposition against militarization and other human rights abuses. AMIHAN, along with rice watch group Bantay Bigas (Rice Watch), has been at the forefront against the Rice Liberalization Law. AMIHAN helped organized Bagsakan (lit. bring down) activities where agricultural goods are directly brought down from the provinces to cities such as Manila in order to help sell the produce of farmers.

=== Human rights advocacy ===
AMIHAN and its members have faced red-tagging and other human rights violations. In 2018, highways from Cordon, Isabela to Tuguegarao, Cagayan were filled with sacks red-tagging them as "terrorists" and recruiters of the New People's Army (NPA) where the Armed Forces of the Philippines (AFP) placed a ₱1-million bounty on Cita Managuelod, AMBI Amihan Isabela leader. Organizations have condemned these attacks as manifestations of both the militaristic and misogynist attacks under the Duterte administration.

On October 15, 2019, International Day of Rural Women, AMIHAN protested in front of Camp Aguinaldo against the militarization of rural communities by the AFP, especially with the implementation of martial law in Mindanao and Memorandum Order 32. They cited the reports of human rights group Karapatan, where among the victims of human rights violations from July 2016 to June 2019, 31 were women, 29 were elderly, and 10 were minors. Chairperson Zen Soriano said that there were attacks against women under militarized circumstances, including sexual harassment and humiliating acts.

In 2020, members of AMIHAN faced attacks in farmland called Hacienda Yulo in Laguna. Armed goons hired by the Yulo clan and the Ayala threatened a group of peasant women. The Yulo-Ayala want to convert the area into a country club and golf course.

In December 2020, Amanda Echanis, an AMIHAN researcher in Cagayan Valley, was arrested in Baggao, Cagayan, but was acquitted on January 14, 2026, from charges of illegal possession of firearms and explosives.

In 2021, a Bagsakan and relief operations activity from Central Luzon farmers was intercepted by the authorities simply because they were carrying publicity materials from AMIHAN.

The organization had their bank account frozen by the Anti–Money Laundering Council because of red-tagging in Mindanao. The Philippine government alleged that they finance the activities of the Communist Party of the Philippines and the NPA. AMIHAN rejected the allegation and said that they were denied due process. Organizations such as the Council for People's Development and Governance have denounced such attacks against AMIHAN, calling this an attack on all civil service organizations in the country.

== See also ==
- Land reform in the Philippines
- Agriculture in the Philippines
