= Manila (2009 film) =

- Theatrical release poster
- Directed by: Raya Martin; Adolfo Alix Jr.
- Written by: Adolfo Alix Jr.; Ramon Sarmiento
- Based on: Manila by Night (1980) by Ishmael Bernal; Jaguar (1979) by Lino Brocka
- Produced by: Piolo Jose Pascual; Edgar Mangahas
- Starring: Piolo Pascual
- Cinematography: Albert Banzon
- Edited by: Jay Halili; Aleks Castañeda
- Music by: Radioactive Sago Project
- Production companies: Bicycle Pictures; MJM Productions
- Distributed by: Star Cinema; 20th Century Fox (Australia and International); Visit Films (US); Sun Entertainment Culture (Hong Kong)
- Release dates: May 19, 2009 (Cannes); July 22, 2009 (Philippines)
- Running time: 90 minutes
- Country: Philippines
- Language: Filipino

Manila is an independently produced twinbill film that pays homage to Lino Brocka's Jaguar and Ishmael Bernal's Manila By Night. Piolo Pascual co-produced and starred in both episodes.

== Cast ==
- Piolo Pascual as William / Phillip
- Rosanna Roces as Juliana
- Jay Manalo as Tristan
- Alessandra de Rossi as Aleria
- Anita Linda as Seniora Aleria
- William Martinez as Dr. Soriano
- Angelica Panganiban as Sydney
- Baron Geisler as Jorge
- Menggie Cobarrubias as Hector
- Marissa Delgado as Rodelya
- Cherrie Madrigal as Nora
- Jiro Manio as Nino
- Aleck Bovick as Limelyn
- John Lapus as Julie
- Katherine Luna as Bernadette

== Production ==
Shot on 16mm black-and-white film before being transferred to 35mm, Manila is divided into a Day episode (which is loosely based on Bernal's 1980 film Manila by Night) and a Night episode (inspired by Brocka's 1979 film Jaguar). The script is co-written by Adolf Alix, Jr. and Ramon Sarmiento and co-directed by Raya Martin and Adolfo Alix, Jr.

For the Day segment, Piolo Pascual portrays William, a drug addict who tries to rebuild his sense of self and reconnect with the people around him. Piolo's character is named William in honor of William Martinez who played the lead role in Manila By Night. The Day segment also stars Angelica Panganiban and Rosanna Roces.

For the Night segment, Piolo portrays Philip, a bodyguard for a mayor's son who mistakenly believes that his boss considers him as part of the family. Piolo's character is named Philip in honor of Phillip Salvador who played the lead role in Jaguar. The Night segment also stars Alessandra de Rossi, Jay Manalo, Jiro Manio, and Anita Linda.

== Release ==
Manila had its world premiere (as one of the six films to have a special screening) in the 62nd Cannes Film Festival (May 12 to May 24, 2010). This film was also exhibited at the Films Around The World section of the 31st Moscow International Film Festival to be held from June 20 to June 24, 2010. It also competed in the 25th Warsaw International Film Festival for the Free Spirit Award (October 8 and 9, 2009)

Manila had its Philippine premiere on July 17, 2010, at the Cultural Center of the Philippines as the opening film of the 5th Cinemalaya Film Festival. Regular screenings started on July 22, 2009, in selected theaters nationwide. This film was also screened in Vladivostok, Oldenburg and Bangkok.

== See also ==
- Jaguar (1979 film)
- Manila By Night
