= Pasan Ko ang Daigdig (film) =

1987 drama film by Lino Brocka

- Official movie poster
- Directed by: Lino Brocka
- Screenplay by: Rene O. Villanueva; Orlando R. Nadres
- Story by: Pablo S. Gomez
- Produced by: Ramon Salvador
- Starring: Sharon Cuneta; Tonton Gutierrez; Loretta Marquez; Mark Gil
- Cinematography: Rody Lacap
- Edited by: Ike Jarlego Jr.
- Music by: Willy Cruz
- Production company: Viva Films
- Distributed by: Viva Films
- Release date: September 30, 1987
- Running time: 128 minutes
- Country: Philippines
- Language: Filipino

Pasan Ko ang Daigdig (English: I Carry the World) is a 1987 Philippine drama film directed by Lino Brocka and written by Rene Villanueva and Orlando Nadres from a comics serial of the same name written by Pablo S. Gomez and serialized in Aliwan Komiks. It stars Sharon Cuneta, Loretta Marquez, and Tonton Gutierrez. It was the first time Brocka and Cuneta worked together on a movie.

Produced and distributed by Viva Films, the film was theatrically released on September 30, 1987. In 2007, it was remade into a television drama series of the same name by GMA Network as the fourth installment of Sine Novela and stars Yasmien Kurdi as Lupe and JC de Vera as Carding.

== Plot ==
Every day, Guadalupe "Lupe" Velez sells sampaguitas to the general public in the outskirts of the capital region while carrying her mother, Metring, who has a mobility impairment, or scrounging for sellable junk in the Smokey Mountain. Although Lupe made a lot of money from these activities, her abusive and gambling-addicted stepfather, Kadyo, squandered it. Metring, on the other hand, was grateful to him for taking care of her when she was ill and for allowing them to continue living at his home after her husband passed away. While she vowed that she would escape poverty, she dabbled in singing, with the help of her friends Luming and Carding.

Metring has lived at their new house ever since Lupe achieved success. When Kadyo unexpectedly shows up while Lupe is away, Metring tells him to leave the house and not to harm her daughter. Lupe angrily demanded that Kadyo leave when she got home, but when he refused, she fought back, starting a violent altercation. Metring stabbed Kadyo in the back with a kitchen knife as she watched them in horror, but she was stabbed in the heart in return. Lupe then grabbed her gun and shot Kadyo to his demise.

After her mother was buried, Lupe was changed and became sympathetic to the people who experienced poverty. She later turns down a proposal to marry Don Ignacio and decides to reunite with Carding and their son.

== Cast ==
- Sharon Cuneta as Guadalupe "Lupe" Velez: a sampaguita seller who vows to escape from poverty
- Loretta Marquez as Metring Velez: Lupe's mother, who has a mobility impairment
- Tonton Gutierrez as Ricardo "Carding" Hernandez: Lupe and Luming's neighbor who works as a waiter in the nightclub
- Mark Gil as Greco: A neighborhood thug.
- Rey Abellana as Tony Gomez: Carding's co-worker at the nightclub where he serves as a pianist and was instrumental in Lupe being discovered by many people in the industry
- Mario Montenegro as Don Ignacio "Jun" Aboitiz Jr.: A record company executive
- Princess Punzalan as Luming: Lupe's friend who taught her to sing
- Raoul Aragon as Kadyo: Lupe's abusive and gambling-addicted stepfather
- Anita Linda as Momay Hernandez: Carding's mother
- Deborah Sun as Bunny: Kadyo's girlfriend who committed an affair with Greco
- Marilen Martinez as Ruffy: A nightclub singer and Lupe's rival
- Joey Luna as Rex
- Jimmy Reyes
- Estrella Kuenzler
- Bebot Davao
- Josie Tagle
- Joseph Miller
- Nic Tagle
- Wencel de Guzman

== Production ==
According to lead star Sharon Cuneta in an interview on Jeepney TV's Showbiz Pa More (hosted by DJ Jhai Ho), the crew took two weeks to shoot the scenes at Smokey Mountain. The production designers and make-up artists with whom the lead actress usually collaborated were changed by the film's director, Lino Brocka. Brocka picked James Cooper as Sharon's make-up artist and hair designer.

== Release ==
The film was released and distributed by Viva Films on September 30, 1987, in 47 theaters across the Metro Manila region and its neighboring provinces of Rizal and Bulacan.

=== Television broadcast ===
The film received a terrestrial television premiere on September 8, 1990, as a feature presentation for Tagalog Movie Greats, ABS-CBN's Saturday night block dedicated to films from various Filipino film studios, including those from Viva Films.

== Reception ==
=== Accolades ===
Accolades received by Pasan Ko ang Daigdig
Year	Award	Category	Recipient(s)	Result	Ref.
1988	FAMAS Awards	Best Actress	Sharon Cuneta	Nominated	
1988	FAMAS Awards	Best Story	Pablo S. Gomez	Nominated	
1988	FAMAS Awards	Best Song	Willy Cruz	Nominated	
1988	FAMAS Awards	Best Sound	Vic Macamay	Nominated	
1988	Star Awards	Movie Actress of the Year	Sharon Cuneta	Nominated	
1988	Star Awards	Movie Discovery of the Year	Princess Punzalan	Nominated	
