= Emmanuel Lacaba =

Filipino journalist and poet (1948–1976)

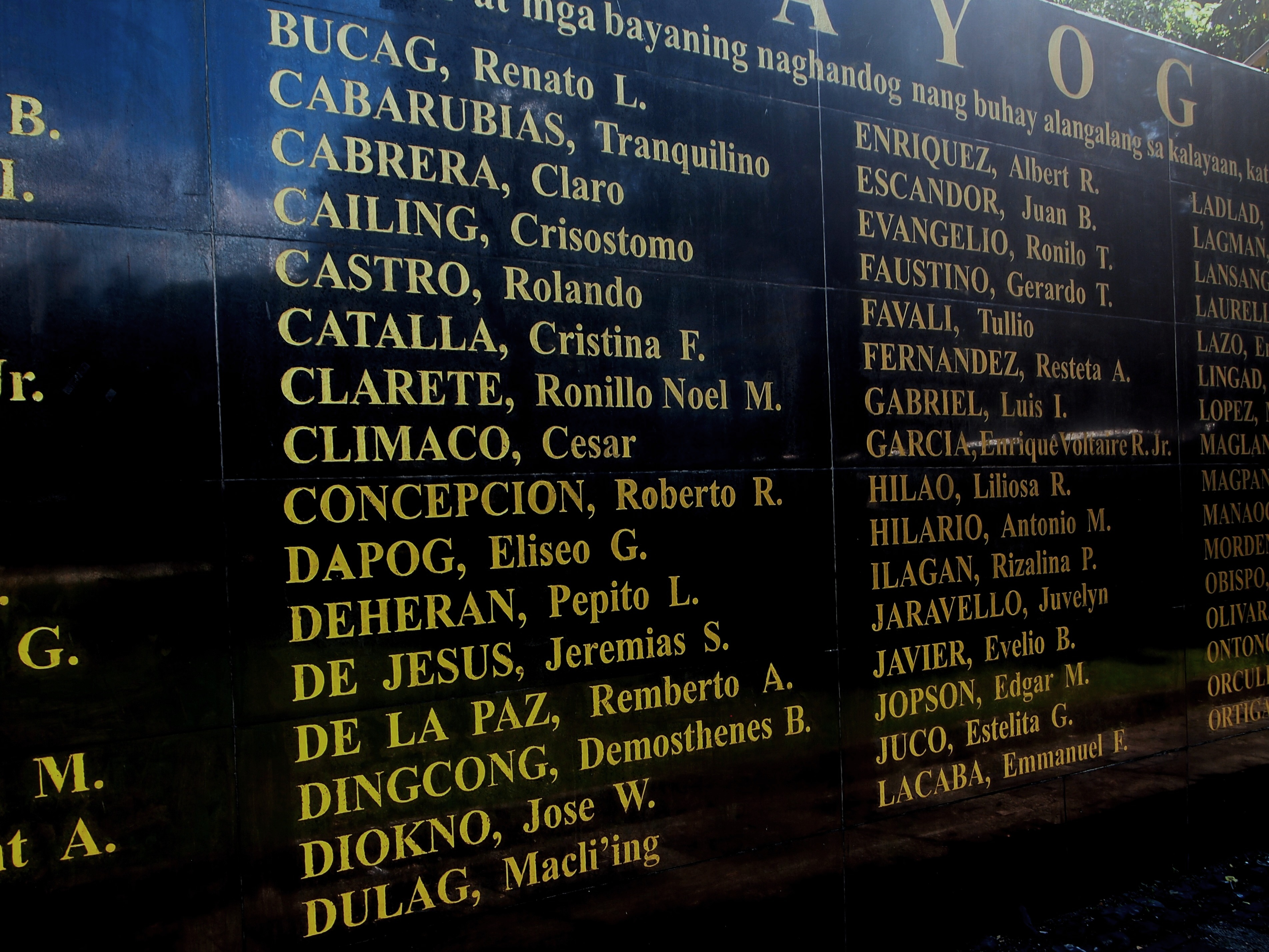
- Detail of the Wall of Remembrance at the Bantayog ng mga Bayani, showing names from the first batch of Bantayog Honorees, including that of Eman Lacaba.
- Born: Emmanuel Agapito Flores Lacaba; December 10, 1948; Cagayan de Oro, Misamis Oriental, Philippines
- Died: March 18, 1976 (aged 27); Asuncion, Davao del Norte, Philippines
- Other name: Eman
- Education: Ateneo de Manila University (BA)
- Occupations: Screenwriter; editor; journalist; activist
- Years active: 1970–1976
- Spouse: Eulalia de Vera (m. 1969)
- Children: 2
- Relatives: Pete Lacaba (brother)

Emmanuel Agapito Flores Lacaba (December 10, 1948 – March 18, 1976), popularly known as Eman Lacaba, was a Filipino writer, poet, essayist, playwright, short story writer, scriptwriter, songwriter and activist, often referred to as the "poet warrior" of the Philippines.

== Life ==
Lacaba was born in Cagayan de Oro and lived there with his family until moving to Pateros, at the age of seven. After attending Ateneo de Manila University, he worked in a variety of fields: as a teacher, production hand, and stage actor. During this time, he also became deeply involved in labor movements, such as Panulat Para sa Kaunlaran ng Sambayanan (PAKSA), as well as leftist political groups like the New People's Army.

A prolific diarist and writer, Jose Lacaba wrote of his brother Emmanuel, "When there was no more paper to write on, he would write on the backs of cigarette tinfoil." As Emmanuel became more deeply involved with the New People's Army, and with other guerilla groups opposed to the martial law regime under the Marcos dictatorship, he went deeper into the Philippines' underground, but his poems and stories continued to circulate and find wide readership.

Lacaba, along with three other dissidents, was killed on March 18, 1976, in Tucaan Balaag, Asuncion, Davao del Norte by members of the Integrated Civilian Home Defense Forces. He had been set to go back shortly to the city for a new assignment that would have used his writing skills, and had agreed to write a script for director Lino Brocka once he got back there. He was 27 years old.

== Works ==
Lacaba wrote the lyrics of "Awit ni Kuala", the song sung by Lolita Rodriguez in the classic Lino Brocka masterpiece 'Tinimbang Ka Ngunit Kulang '. He also composed new revolutionary lyrics in Cebuano for some well-known folk songs.

The poet Luis Francia included Lacaba's work in a portfolio of Filipino poems for the 45th Issue of BOMB.

His work has been collected in two anthologies: Salvaged Poems (1986) and Salvaged Prose (1992). Aside from his published works, the collection also features previously unpublished prose writings found in his filing cabinets in Pateros, Rizal.

== Awards and honors ==
- The book Six Young Filipino Martyrs states, "Not many poets are given the honor of becoming martyrs for their country. In the Philippines there are only two: Jose Rizal and a disciple he never knew, Emmanuel Lacaba."
- The Cultural Center of the Philippines (CCP) confers the Gawad Eman Lacaba Award to young poets. Lacaba and his brother Pete were accorded the distinction of being among the top 100 Filipinos in culture.
- The Ateneo de Manila University paid tribute to Lacaba on December 8–14, 2002.

== See also ==
- Amanda Echanis, granddaughter and fellow activist

== Sources ==
- https://web.archive.org/web/20081201160459/http://www.manilatimes.net/national/2008/apr/06/yehey/weekend/20080406week1.html
- http://www.arkibongbayan.org/2007-03March27-freesatur/doc/beyond%20literature%20by%20boni%20ilagan.txt
- https://web.archive.org/web/20080906153402/http://www.businessmirror.com.ph/0307%26082008/life03.html
- https://filipinopoets.blogspot.com/2008/04/principe-by-eman-lacaba.html
- https://web.archive.org/web/20071020102640/http://www.anvilpublishing.com/bookdetails.php?id=2004000190
