= Pasan Ko ang Daigdig =

Philippine television drama series

- Title card
- Also known as: World on My Shoulders
- Genre: Drama
- Created by: Pablo S. Gomez
- Based on: Pasan Ko ang Daigdig (1987) by Lino Brocka
- Directed by: Joel Lamangan
- Starring: Yasmien Kurdi; JC de Vera; Gina Alajar
- Theme music composer: Willy Cruz
- Opening theme: "Pasan Ko ang Daigdig" by Yasmien Kurdi
- Country of origin: Philippines
- Original language: Tagalog
- No. of episodes: 89

Production
- Executive producer: Joseph Buncalan
- Camera setup: Multiple-camera setup
- Running time: 25–35 minutes
- Production company: GMA Entertainment TV

Original release
- Network: GMA Network
- Release: September 10, 2007 – January 11, 2008

Pasan Ko ang Daigdig (transl. my burden is the world / international title: World on My Shoulders) is a Philippine television drama series broadcast by GMA Network. Based on a 1987 Philippine film of the same title, the series is the fourth installment of Sine Novela. Directed by Joel Lamangan, it stars Yasmien Kurdi, JC de Vera and Gina Alajar. It premiered on September 10, 2007 on the network's Dramarama sa Hapon line up. The series concluded on January 11, 2008, with a total of 89 episodes.

== Cast and characters ==
Cast

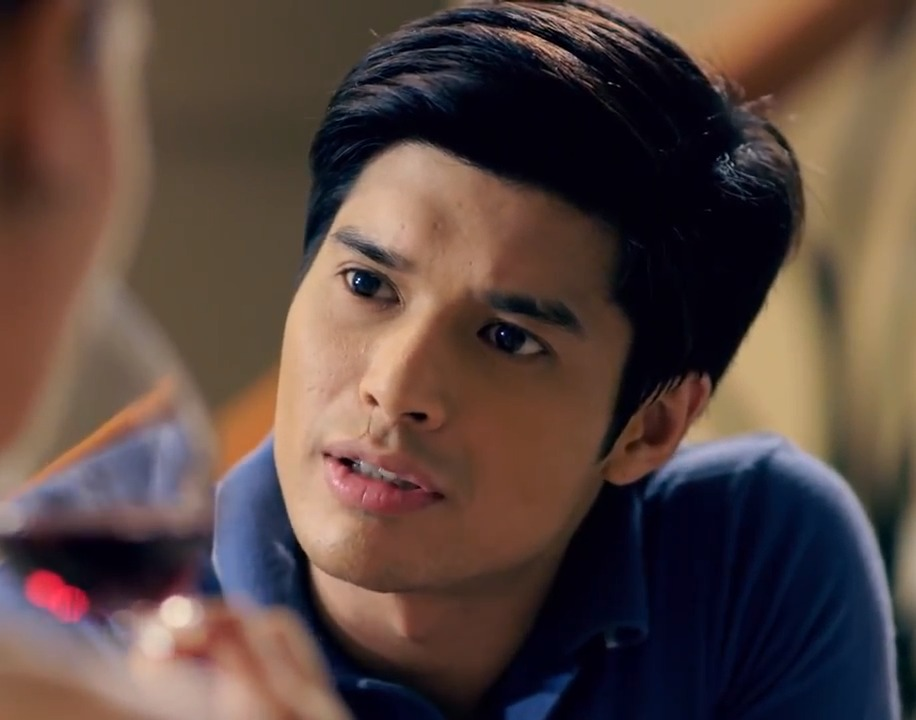
JC de Vera

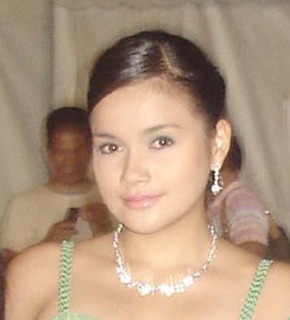
Yasmien Kurdi

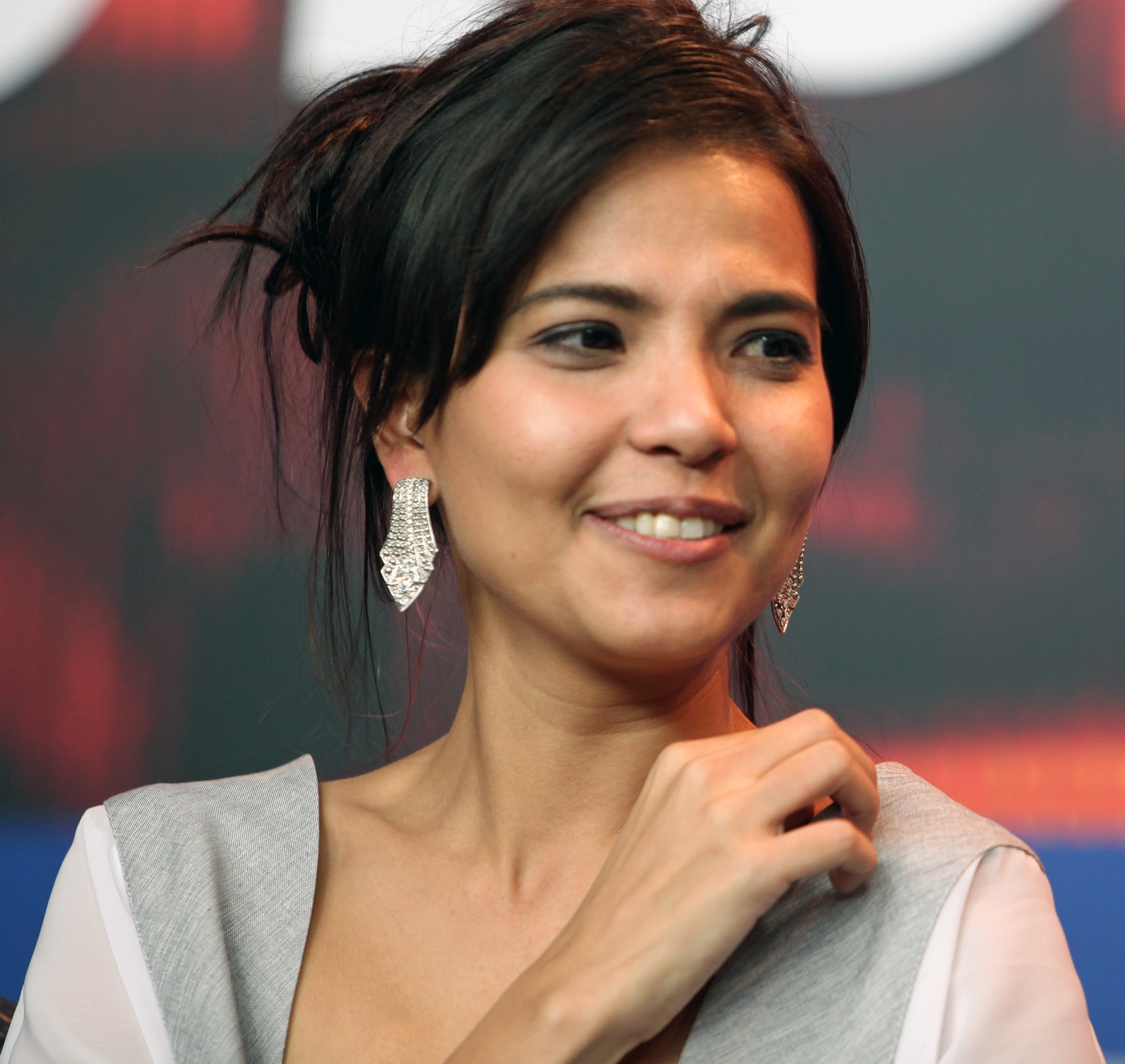
Alessandra De Rossi

Lead cast

- JC de Vera as Carding
- Yasmien Kurdi as Lupe Velez
- Gina Alajar as Metring Velez

Supporting cast

- Gary Estrada as Kadyo
- Alessandra De Rossi as Luming
- Polo Ravales as Tony
- Maureen Larrazabal as Bunny
- Mart Escudero as Isko
- Jennica Garcia as Janet
- Marcus Madrigal as Griego
- Karen delos Reyes as Sosima
- Jenine Desederio as Ruffy
- Racquel Vilavicencio as Veron
- Tony Mabesa as Ben
- Jim Pebangco as Herman
- Nonie Buencamino as Efren
- Sweet Ramos as Josie
- Kevin Santos as Gerard
- Isabel Granada as Rica
- Charlie Davao as Ignacio

== Production ==
Principal photography commenced on August 24, 2007.

== Ratings ==
According to AGB Nielsen Philippines' Mega Manila household television ratings, the pilot episode of Pasan Ko ang Daigdig earned a 19.8% rating. The final episode scored a 20.7% rating.
