= Sa Kabila ng Lahat =

1991 political thriller film by Lino Brocka

- Theatrical poster
- Directed by: Lino Brocka
- Written by: Roy C. Iglesias
- Produced by: William C. Leary
- Starring: Dina Bonnevie; Tonton Gutierrez; Nanette Medved
- Cinematography: Clodualdo Austria Jr.
- Edited by: George Jarlego
- Music by: Jaime Fabregas
- Production company: Viva Films
- Distributed by: Viva Films
- Release date: May 15, 1991
- Running time: 122 minutes
- Country: Philippines
- Language: Filipino

Sa Kabila ng Lahat (lit. 'In Spite of Everything') is a 1991 Philippine political thriller drama film directed by Lino Brocka from a story and screenplay by Roy C. Iglesias. Starring Dina Bonnevie and Tonton Gutierrez, the film follows a news commentator who became entangled in the politician's affair, corruption, and illegal drug trade.

Produced and distributed by Viva Films, it was theatrically released on May 15, 1991. This is the last film made by Brocka that was released during his lifetime before he was killed in a car accident.

== Plot ==
Maia is the host of the investigative news magazine program Punto Blangko (Point Blank), which focuses on political issues, particularly corruption in the government. During the Philippine Television Awards, her show won Best Public Affairs Show while Maia won Best Newscaster. She, along with her program's segment host and radio commentator Mike, are on their way to their victory party when they come across a hostage-taking where a Chinese businessman is being held by a notorious criminal named Van Turko. However, Van Turko kills the Chinese businessman after answering a phone call from another syndicate member named Daniel Fu. But, Boy Boga, the right-hand man of Mayor Ventura Velasco comes and tells Van Turko to turn himself to the authorities and pledges to take care of everything. Mike is known as a critic of the mayor, who was a former movie actor.

Maia, who also holds an executive post at the network, is offered by Ventura's wife, Cresencia, and school superintendent Primitivo Mundial airtime on their station, but they refuse, as a documentary series of Mike is supposed to air. Ventura is also known for his corrupt practices as he favors his father-in-law's business to engage in government services, despite being a Born Again Christian. He is also known for his extramarital affairs, including one with Maia, whom he also uses to further increase his popularity for reelection. Maia's close friend Lala tells her about some of Boy Boga's crimes, making Daniel more furious. During Ventura's guesting on Maia's show, a clip of Boy Boga and his men beating an insane person during the hostage-taking is shown. When Boy Boga is invited by Daniel, policemen who were with Boy arrest Lala, who seeks help from Maia, who in turn asks Ventura. Ventura orders the release of Lala, who decides to stay with Maia. Maia also discovers that Van Turko has a backer at the City Hall. When Boy Boga's men are about to make a transaction with another drug syndicate, they are killed by policemen headed by Major Blin. Boga blames Daniel for the incident. Lala steals Maia's jewelry and car. Mike is now working on a documentary entitled Lungsod ng Basag na Pangarap (City of Broken Dreams). One night, Ventura suffers a heart attack in Maia's condominium unit and is flown to the United States for an operation. Cresencia went into Maia's unit and discovers Ventura's affair with her, provoking her to bully and assault Maia at a salon and call her a whore. With the help of Boy Boga, Van Turko escapes, while his men beat up and kill Daniel with a grenade. A disoriented Lala goes to the top of a building trying to kill herself but is dissuaded from doing so by Maia, who convinces her that Daniel's death was accidental and was perpetrated by rightist soldiers. Lala goes to Daniel's wake but is killed in an ambush by Van Turko.

When Maia and Ventura's affair emerges, she is removed from her job and is the target of a hit by Van Turko to be murdered. While Van Turko recovers after being shot during a robbery, he watches a news report saying that he has a backer at City Hall, who turns out to be Boy Boga. Mike's documentary is pulled out from airing after Primitivo lobbies with the station management. Van Turko asks for Maia's help and goes to Mike. There, Van Turko confesses that he is part of the Hit Squad formed by Boy Boga for Mayor Velasco's re-election bid, and they are involved in gun smuggling and drugs, as well as the killing of some of the Mayor's critics. Police arrive, making Van Turko furious, as Maia reveals that Boy Boga also controls the police. Maia, Mike, and Van Turko escape with Van Turko's recorded confession but are blocked by Boy Boga, who shoots Mike as he shields Maia. Van Turko then shoots Boy Boga before his is shot by the latter's men. Mike tells Maia to keep the camera and the tape before dying. Mayor Velasco died from complications of his operation, while Cresencia and Priming were charged with graft and corruption.

At the next Philippine Television Awards, Mike is posthumously awarded the Best Television Journalist of the Year for his documentary series. Maia, who accepts the award on his behalf, announces that his documentary series is about to air, and acknowledges that Mike taught her about being fearless in telling the truth.

== Cast ==
- Dina Bonnevie as Maria Robles
- Tonton Gutierrez as Mike Serrano
- Nanette Medved as Lala Serrano
- Ronaldo Valdez as Mayor Ventura Velasco
- Mark Gil as Boy Boga
- William Lorenzo as Daniel Fu
- Rey Sagum as Van Turko
- Joonee Gamboa as Primitivo Mundial
- Menggie Cobarrubias as Eugene
- Celeste Legaspi as Cresencia Velasco

== Reception ==
=== Accolades ===
Accolades received by Sa Kabila ng Lahat
Award	Date of ceremony	Category	Recipient(s)	Result	Ref.
1992 Young Critics Circle Awards	January 1992	Best Picture	Sa Kabila ng Lahat	Won	
1992 Young Critics Circle Awards	January 1992	Best Director	Lino Brocka	Won	
1992 Young Critics Circle Awards	January 1992	Best Screenplay	Sa Kabila ng Lahat; Written by Roy C. Iglesias	Won (Note: Tied with Dinampot Ka Lang sa Putik.)	
8th PMPC Star Awards for Movies	March 8, 1992	Best Picture	Sa Kabila ng Lahat	Won	
8th PMPC Star Awards for Movies	March 8, 1992	Best Director	Lino Brocka	Won	
8th PMPC Star Awards for Movies	March 8, 1992	Best Adapted Screenplay	Sa Kabila ng Lahat; Written by Roy C. Iglesias	Nominated	
8th PMPC Star Awards for Movies	March 8, 1992	Best Editor	George Jarlego	Won	

== See also ==
- Makiusap Ka sa Diyos
