= Jaguar (1979 film) =

1979 neo-noir crime film by Lino Brocka

- Theatrical release poster
- Directed by: Lino Brocka
- Written by: Jose F. Lacaba; Ricardo Lee
- Based on: "The Boy Who Wanted to Become Society" by Quijano de Manila
- Produced by: Rolando S. Atienza
- Starring: Phillip Salvador
- Cinematography: Conrado Baltazar
- Edited by: Augusto Salvador; Rene Tala
- Music by: Max V. Jocson (Note: Philippine version); Winston Raval (Note: Credited as "Vanishing Tribe". International version)
- Production company: Bancom Audiovision
- Distributed by: Bancom Audiovision
- Release date: 31 August 1979
- Running time: 100 minutes
- Country: Philippines
- Language: Filipino

Jaguar is a 1979 Filipino neo noir crime film directed by Lino Brocka from a story and screenplay written by Jose F. Lacaba and Ricky Lee. It was entered into the 1980 Cannes Film Festival. The story is based on the real-life "Brown Derby Shooting" incident in 1960 as documented by Quijano de Manila in the article "The Boy Who Wanted to Become Society", later republished in the non-fiction crime anthology, Reportage on Crime (1977).

The film was nominated for the Palme d'Or at the 1980 Cannes Film Festival, becoming the first Filipino film to compete in the main competition of the festival. It won Best Picture and Best Director at the 1980 FAMAS Awards. It also won five Gawad Urian Awards, including Best Picture and Best Direction. Anita Linda was nominated for Best Supporting Actress at the Urian Awards.

A 4K restoration of the film premiered at the 16th Lumière Festival in October 2024 in Lyon, France.

== Cast ==
- Phillip Salvador as Poldo Miranda
- Amy Austria as Cristy Montes
- Menggie Cobarrubias as Sonny Gaston
- Anita Linda as Mother
- Johnny Delgado as Direk San Pedro
- Mario Escudero as Mang Berto
- Jimmy Santos
- Gigi Salvador as Apple
- Joel Lamangan as Press
- Roi Vinzon as Edmon

== Reception ==
=== Accolades ===
Accolades received by Jaguar (1979 film)
| Year | Award | Category | Recipient(s) | Result | Ref. |
|---|---|---|---|---|---|
| 1980 | Gawad Urian Awards | Best Film | Jaguar | Won | |
| 1980 | Gawad Urian Awards | Best Director | Lino Brocka | Won | |
| 1980 | Gawad Urian Awards | Best Screenplay | Jaguar; Written by Jose F. Lacaba and Ricky Lee | Won | |
| 1980 | Gawad Urian Awards | Best Actor | Phillip Salvador | Nominated | |
| 1980 | Gawad Urian Awards | Best Supporting Actor | Menggie Cobarubbias | Won | |
| 1980 | Gawad Urian Awards | Best Supporting Actress | Amy Austria | Won | |
| 1980 | Gawad Urian Awards | Best Supporting Actress | Anita Linda | Nominated | |
| 1980 | Gawad Urian Awards | Best Cinematography | Conrado Baltazar | Won | |
| 1980 | Gawad Urian Awards | Best Editing | Rene Tala | Nominated | |
| 1980 | Gawad Urian Awards | Best Music | Winston Raval (Vanishing Tribe) | Nominated | |
| 1980 | Gawad Urian Awards | Best Production Design | Bobby Bautista | Nominated | |
| 1980 | FAMAS Awards | Best Picture | Jaguar | Won | |
| 1980 | FAMAS Awards | Best Director | Lino Brocka | Won | |
| 1980 | FAMAS Awards | Best Screenplay | Jaguar; Written by Jose F. Lacaba and Ricky Lee | Nominated | |
| 1980 | FAMAS Awards | Best Actor | Phillip Salvador | Nominated | |
| 1980 | FAMAS Awards | Best Supporting Actor | Menggie Cobarubbias | Nominated | |
| 1980 | FAMAS Awards | Best Editing | Rene Tala | Nominated | |
| 1980 | FAMAS Awards | Best Sound | Luis Reyes and Ramon Reyes | Nominated | |
| 1980 | FAMAS Awards | Best Production Design | Bobby Bautista | Nominated | |

== See also ==
- Kisapmata
- Bayan Ko: Kapit sa Patalim
- Orapronobis
- Manila
