= Angela Markado (1980 film) =

1980 crime drama film by Lino Brocka

- Official movie poster
- Directed by: Lino Brocka
- Screenplay by: Jose F. Lacaba
- Story by: Carlo J. Caparas
- Produced by: Nacy Nocom
- Starring: Hilda Koronel; Johnny Delgado; Rez Cortez; Ruel Vernal; Tonio Gutierrez; Dave Brodett; Celia Rodriguez; Raoul Aragonn
- Cinematography: Conrado Baltazar
- Edited by: Augusto Salvador
- Music by: Jeric Soriano
- Production company: Four Seasons Films International
- Distributed by: Solar Pictures
- Release date: November 7, 1980
- Running time: 93 minutes
- Country: Philippines
- Language: Filipino

Angela Markado is a 1980 Philippine crime drama film directed by Lino Brocka from a screenplay written by Jose F. Lacaba, based on the comics serial of the same name created and written by Carlo J. Caparas. Conrado Baltazar is the film's cinematographer and Augusto Salvador is its editor. The film stars Hilda Koronel, Raoul Aragon, Rez Cortez, Johnny Delgado, Ruel Vernal, and Celia Rodriguez.

== Synopsis ==
Angela, a bar waitress is kidnapped, abused and gang-raped repeatedly by human traffickers who tattooed their names on her back. Upon escaping and returning home, she finds her mother died and her friend being raped by the same thugs. Seeking vengeance, Angela stalks and kills her tormenters meticulously, using various disguises.

== Cast ==
- Hilda Koronel as Angela
- Raoul Aragon as Celso
- Rez Cortez as Delio
- Johnny Delgado as Barry
- Ruel Vernal as Oscar
- Celia Rodriguez as Rona
- Tonio Gutierrez as Bren
- Dave Brodett as Melchor
- Estrella Kuenzler as Angela's mother
- Gamay Arkoncel as Monica

== Release ==
The film was screened at and competed in the Festival des 3 Continents in Nantes, France, in 1984, in which it won the best picture award. Conrado Baltazar won best cinematography for the film at the Gawad Urian in 1980 and was nominated at the Famas Award in the same year.

== Remake ==
The movie was remade in 2015 under the direction of Caparas and starred Andi Eigenmann.

== See also ==
- Angela Markado (2015 film)
