= Amanda Echanis =

Filipino peasant activist, student leader, and writer

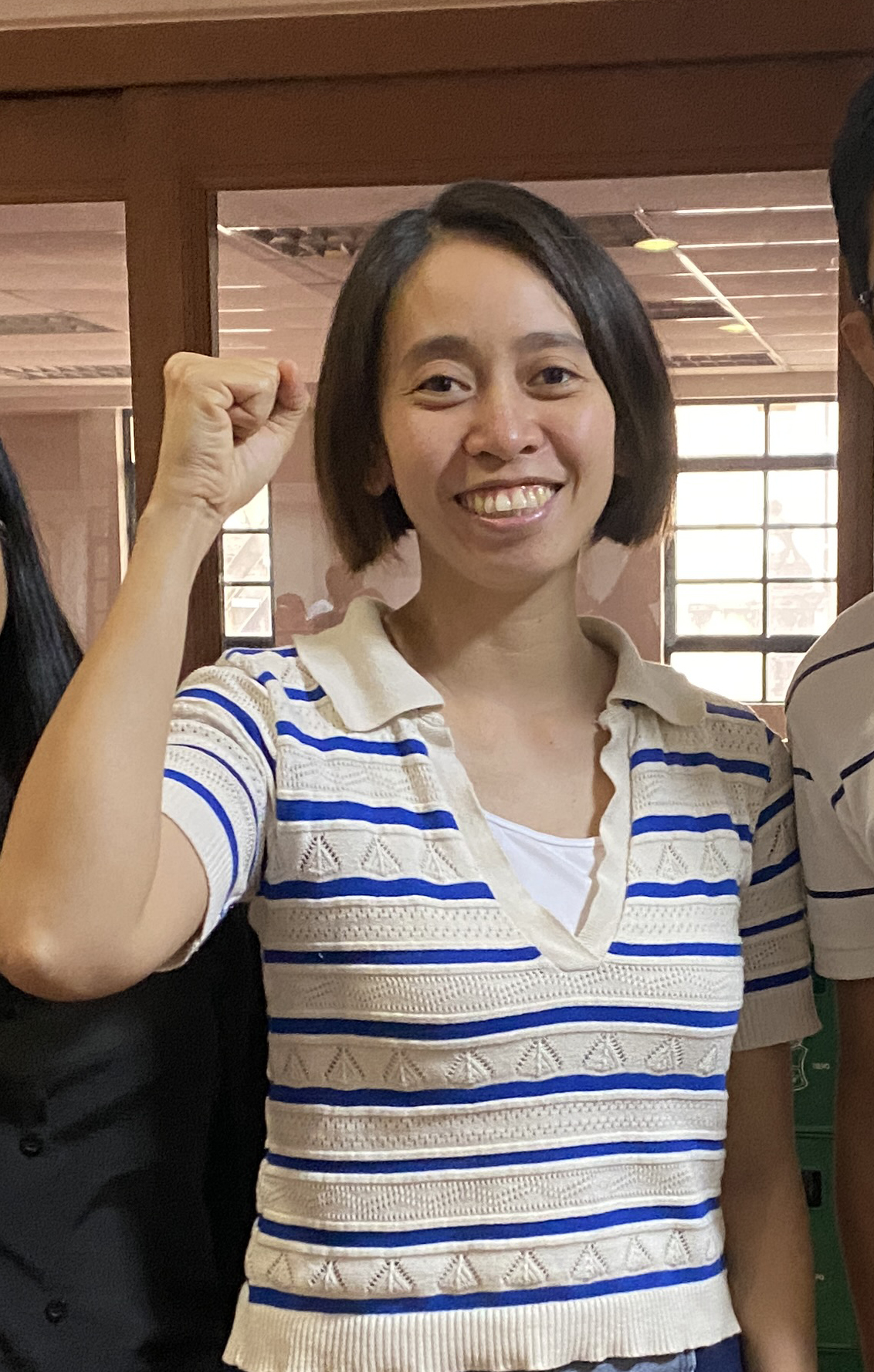
- Echanis, 2026
- Born: Amanda Socorro Lacaba Ehcanis; October 1, 1988 (age 37)
- Education: Philippine High School for the Arts University of the Philippines Diliman
- Occupations: peasant activist, writer, student activist

Amanda Socorro Echanis (born October 1, 1988) is a Filipino peasant-activist, student leader, and writer who was a political prisoner. She was arrested on early December 2, 2020 in a house where she was staying in Baggao, Cagayan. After more than five years behind bars, the local court of Tuguegarao City, the Tuguegarao City Regional Trial Court (RTC) Branch 10, acquitted her of charges of illegal possession of firearms and explosives.

== Background ==
Echanis is the daughter of Randall Echanis, who as a consultant for the National Democratic Front of the Philippines and who was tortured and killed on August 10, 2020, when he was chairperson of Anakpawis Partylist. Echanis is a granddaughter of martial law activist Emmanuel Lacaba. She was once the youngest Filipino political prisoner when her parents Randall and Linda Lacaba-Echanis were detained in 1990 because of falsified charges, when she was two years old.

Echanis studied high school at the Philippine High School for the Arts. She began her activism at the University of the Philippines Diliman (UP-Diliman) where she joined activist organizations such as the local chapter of the Student Christian Movement of the Philippines. After college, she decided to organize peasants in Cagayan Valley, interested in researching and being with solidarity with the farmers in the region. She was the researcher for AMIHAN National Federation of Peasant Women, investigating the effects of the GMO golden corn on the livelihood of local farmers.

== Arrest and detention ==
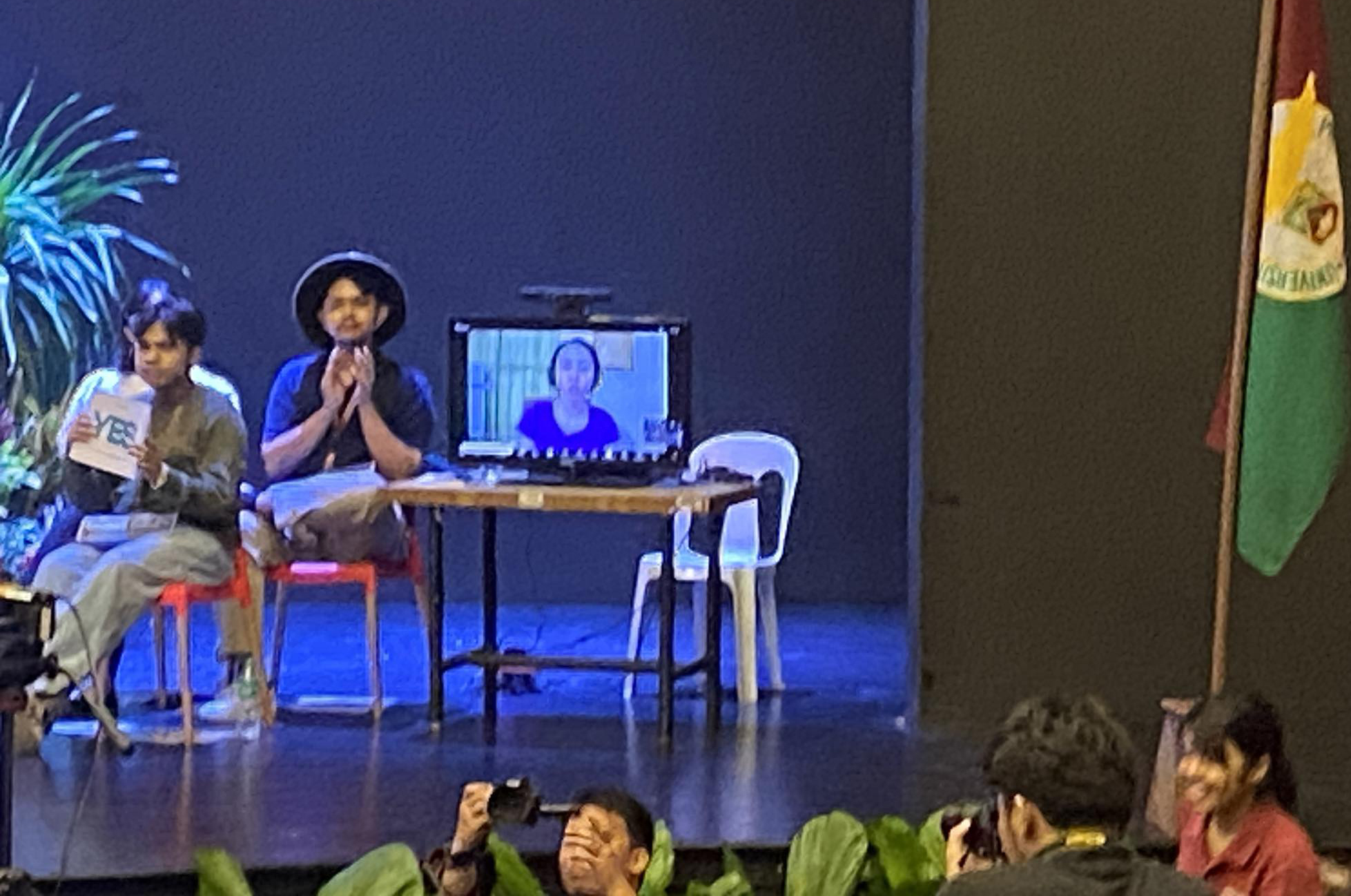
Echanis campaigning for the 2025 student council remotely while in prison.

While in Cagayan, with her one-month-old child Randall Emmanuel, Echanis was arrested in a raid during the early hours of the morning under the charge of counterinsurgency by the Philippine National Police (PNP) and the Criminal Investigation and Detection Group under the violation of the non-bailable Comprehensive Firearms and Ammunition Regulation Act. Echanis and activist groups claimed that evidence were planted, a tactic that has been claimed as a pattern under unjust arrests and other human rights violations during the 'crackdown' of activists under then-President Rodrigo Duterte. Kilusang Magbubukid ng Pilipinas claimed that the warrant only arrived two hours after the raid.

She was charged by the authorities such as the then-PNP chief Debold Sinas, as having links to the Communist movement in the Philippines. Others denounced the red-tagging of Echanis. Senators de Lima, a fellow political prisoner under Duterte, Pangilinan, Drilon, and Hontiveros called for her, and her newborn child, to be released under humanitarian circumstances.

While in detention, Echanis returned to UP-Diliman via a remote online set-up in order to finish Bachelor of Arts in Malikhaing Pagsulat (Creative Writing), and continue to write poetry. She was the 2023 awardee of the Southeast Asian Translation Mentorship. In 2025, she ran as Councilor for the University Student Council, the first time a political prisoner ran for the student council while behind bars. She said in her campaign video: "Life doesn't end in prison. As they say, bloom where you are planted". On the announcement of results on May 16, she topped the student council election, receiving 4,830 votes. Since then, more have clamored for her release, adding the reason that she must serve her term not behind bars. A "Free Amanda Echanis Movement" was launched composed of advocates, organizers, artists, human rights groups, and other concerned organizations and individuals.

International support for the investigation of her case and for her release have come from groups such as PEN International, International Coalition for Human Rights in the Philippines (ICHRP), and World Student Christian Federation Asia Pacific.

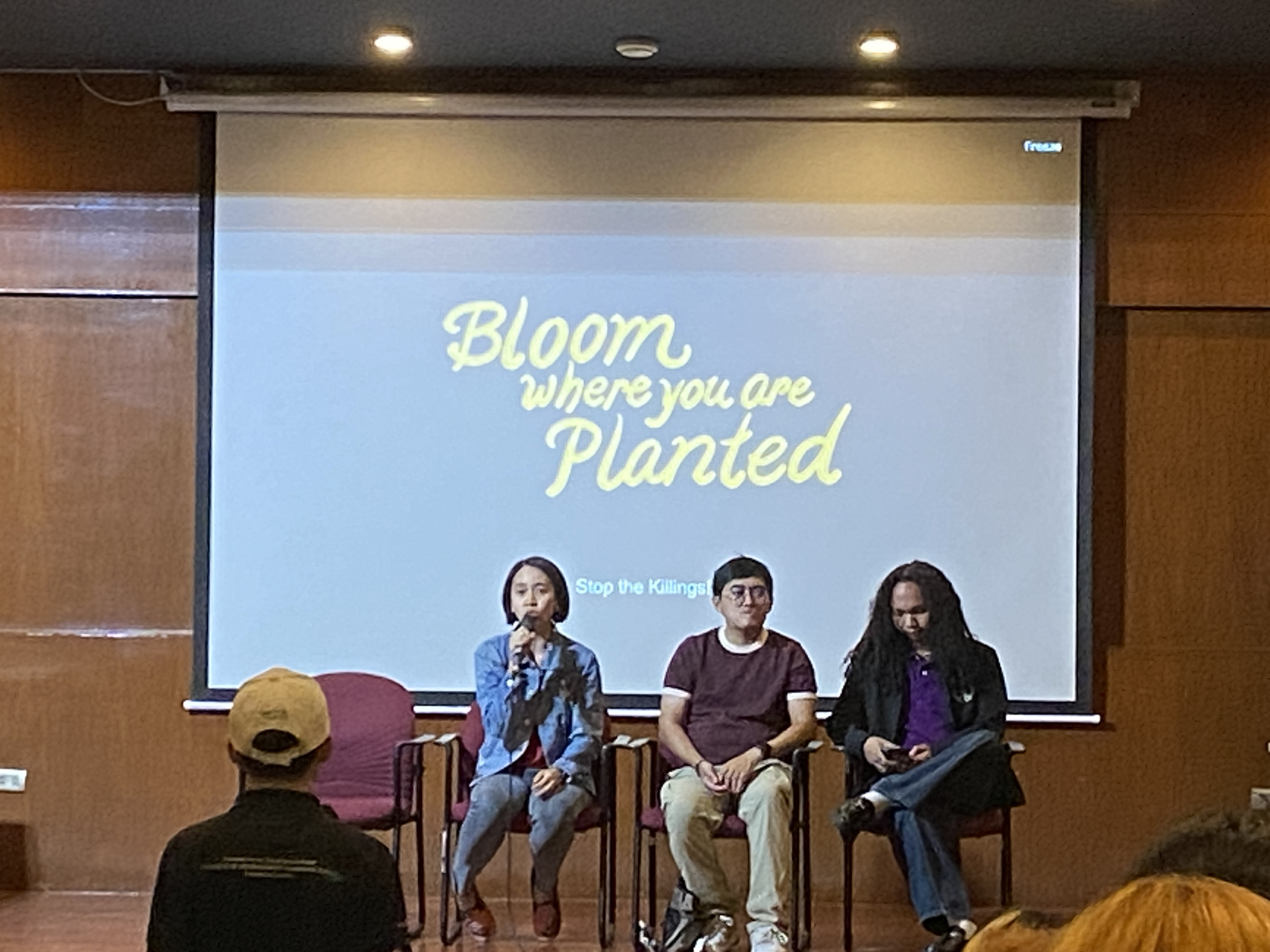
Screening of Bloom Where You Are Planted with director Abao.

Together with fellow activists from Cagayan Valley development worker Agnes Mesina and slain peace consultant Randy Malayao, she was one of the features of the documentary film Bloom Where You Are Planted directed by Noni Abao. In the film she narrated her story as an activist, her burdens being incarcerated, and challenges as a student. In 2025, it became the first documentary to win Best Film at Cinemalaya film festival. Director Noni Abao received the Balanghai trophy for the Full-Length Category

== Release ==
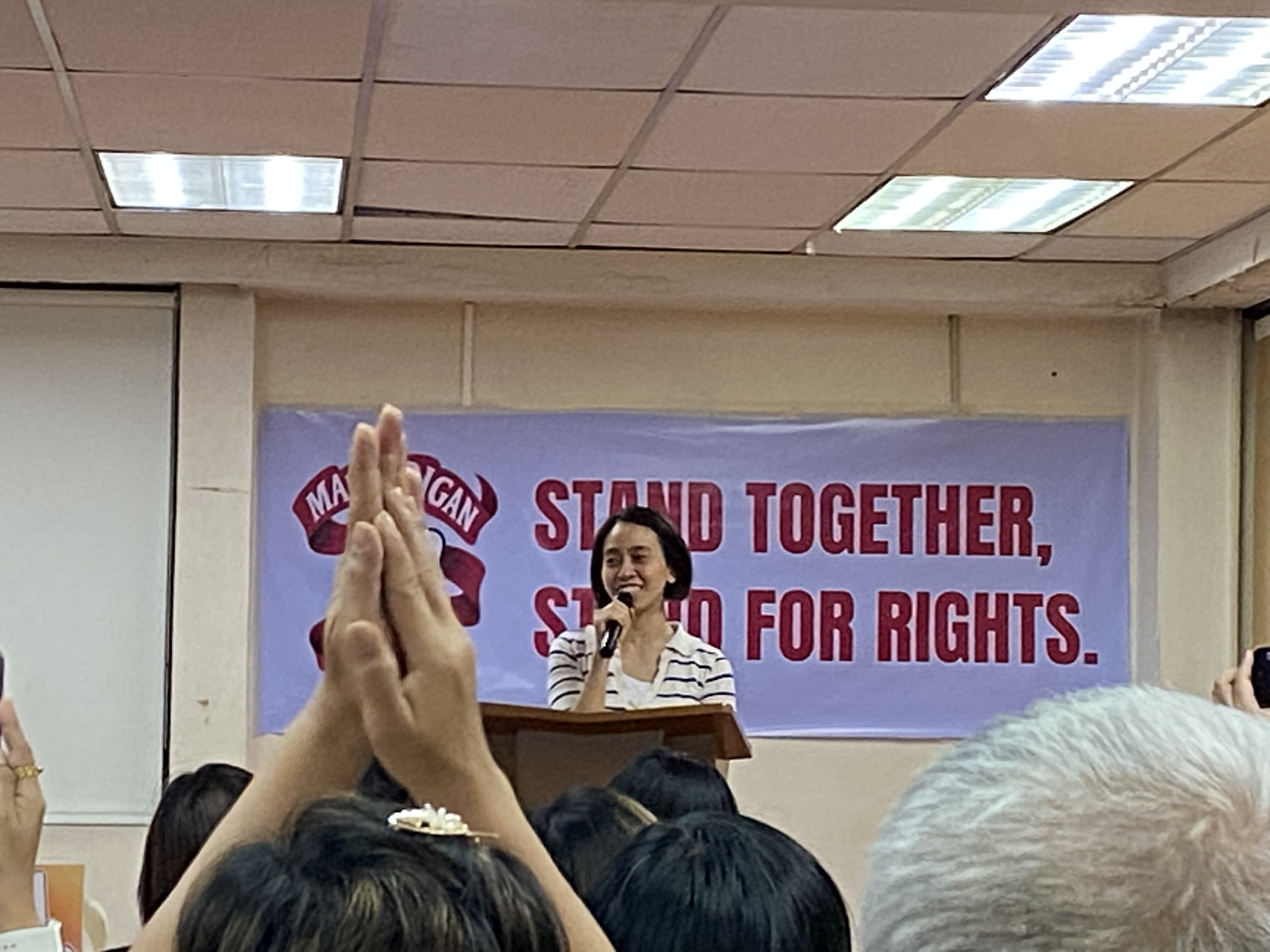
Echanis at a human rights forum, Malate Church.

Echanis was freed on January 14, 2026 after a decision dated December 27, 2025 was made public. Charges against her were dismissed by a promulgation hearing by the Tuguegarao City Regional Trial Court (RTC) Branch 10. The court said that the prosecution "failed to establish all the essential elements" of the charges against Echanis. Further, the court said that "mere speculations and probabilities" were not enough.

With the release of Echanis, ICHRP has called for the release of all political prisoners under the current Marcos Jr. administration, which numbered 696 as of November 2025. Progressives have celebrated the release of Echanis while anticipating the verdict of 'Tacloban 5' activists Frenchie Mae Cumpio and Marielle Domequil were set on January 21, 2026. The two were found guilty of financing terrorism and received a sentence of up to 18 years of jail time. Cumpio and Domequil were also acquitted on separate charges of possessing firearms and explosives.

Her release sparked further outcry about red-tagging in the Philippines against political dissenters and other progressive individuals. The support group for political prisoners, 'Kapatid', which is composed of families of political prisoners, has pushed for the accountability of those responsible for the "planting of evidence" and said violation of human rights not only against Echanis but to other political prisoners in the Philippines. They also called for the release of all political prisoners in the Philippines and the end of the "criminalization of activism".

== Literary work ==
Echanis is the author of several plays, a screenplay about Carmen Deunida who as an urban poor movement activist that is titled Nanay Mameng and was published in 2015. She is also author of a collection of poems written in prison and published in 2023, entitled Binhi ng Paglaya ("Seeds of Liberation"). She is the author of a collection of memoirs entitled Tatlong Paslit ("Three Children").

== See also ==
- Corruption in the Philippines
- Human rights in the Philippines
