= Nakaw Na Pag-ibig =

- Directed by: Lino Brocka
- Screenplay by: Eddie Naval
- Based on: An American Tragedy by Theodore Dreiser
- Produced by: Nacy G. Nocom
- Starring: Nora Aunor; Phillip Salvador; Hilda Koronel; Bongchi Miraflor; Ernie Zarate
- Cinematography: Conrado Baltazar
- Edited by: Augusto Salvador
- Music by: George Canseco
- Production companies: Associated Entertainment Corporation; Peter L. Gan Films
- Release date: 25 January 1980
- Country: Philippines
- Language: Filipino

Nakaw Na Pag-ibig is a 1980 Filipino drama film directed by Lino Brocka from a screenplay by Eddie Naval. It starred acclaimed actress Nora Aunor and Philip Salvador. The film is about an ambitious man who left his girlfriend for a more affluent woman.

== Plot ==
Corazon Rivera (Nora Aunor) is a factory worker in a textile firm. Her live-in partner is her ambitious co-worker, Robert de Asis (Phillip Salvador), a law student. One day, she finds herself pregnant; he is not pleased with the news. Nevertheless, they are married in civil rites. He does not inform his office of his change in status. He is about to get himself into the good graces of his boss. He is made the boss’ chauffeur. Cynthia Ocampo (Hilda Koronel), the boss’ daughter, falls in love with him and also becomes pregnant. They plan a church wedding. But first, he must get rid of his first wife. He attempts to push her off a cliff in Baguio. He changes his mind but the hysterical woman slips and falls to her death. He is sentenced to a prison term.

== Cast ==
- Nora Aunor as Corazon Rivera
- Phillip Salvador as Robert de Asis
- Hilda Koronel as Cynthia Ocampo
- Bongchi Miraflor
- Ernie Zarate
- Jumbo Salvador
- Eddie Gicoso
- Toni Pangilinan
- Naty Mallares
- Toni Rubio
- Jess Ramos
- Cecilia B. Garrucho
- Don Gallardo
- Susan Africa
- George Calma
- Allan Bautista

== Reception ==
=== Critical response ===
Isagani Cruz, writing for the Movie Times, wrote that "The film succeeds as far as the psychological portrayal of Salvador's character is concerned. As he rises in social class, he falls in strength of will and integrity."
