= International Day of Rural Women =

UN world day

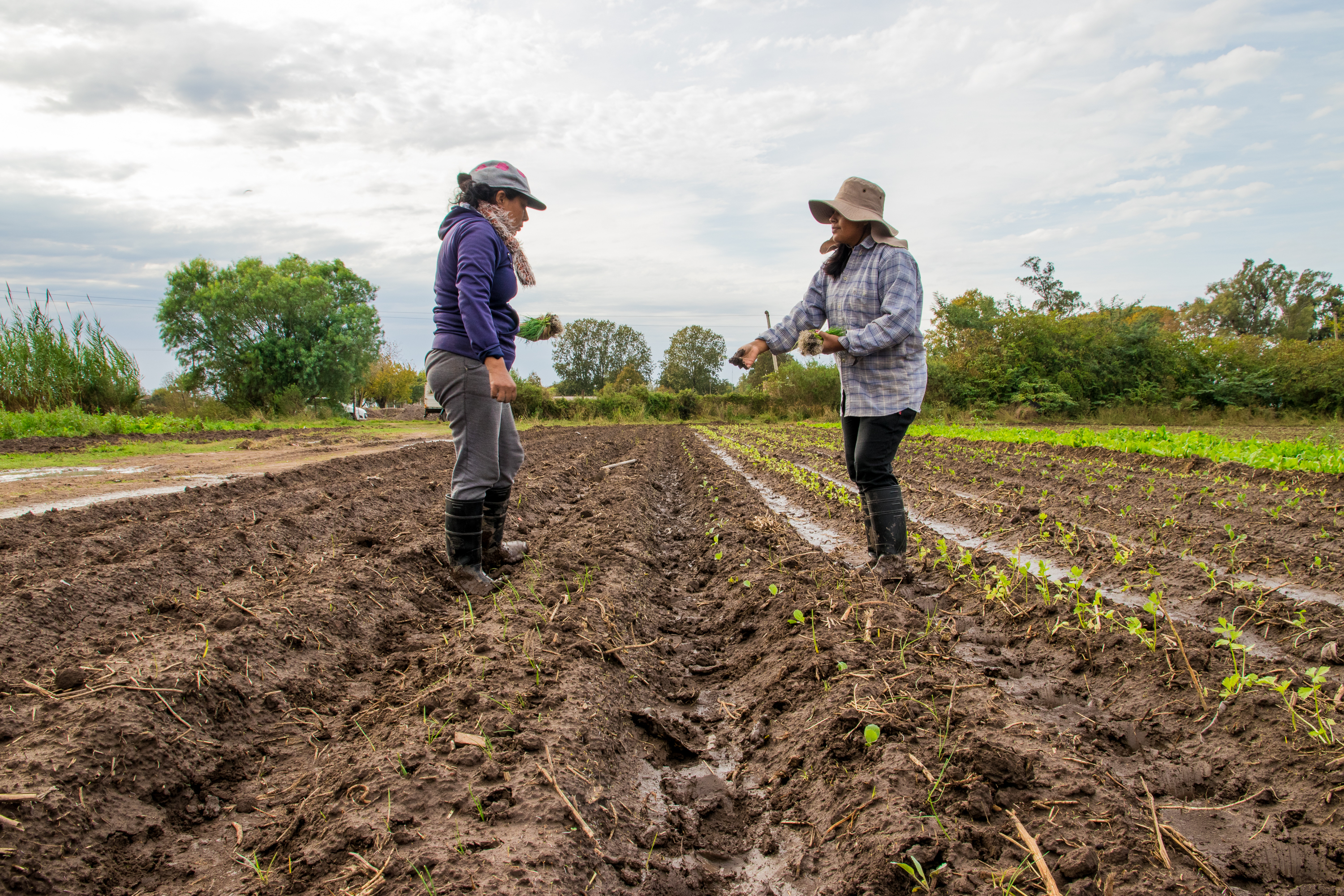
- Women agricultural workers in Greater Santa Fe
- Type: International
- Date: 15 October
- Frequency: Annual

International Day of Rural Women was implemented by the United Nations General Assembly, and is celebrated every year on October 15, with the aim of highlighting the role and situation of women in rural areas.

== History ==
The first International Day of Rural Women was celebrated on 15 October 1995, and was promoted and organized by the WWSF (Women's World Summit Foundation). Ten years later, the United Nations General Assembly officially adopted the date with the signing of Resolution 62/136 on December 18, 2007.

== Concept of Rural Women ==
A rural woman is any female person who lives and works in a rural area. Most of them depend on natural resources and agriculture for their livelihoods, and are often farmers, entrepreneurs or formal or informal agricultural workers.

Despite being 25% of the world's population and 43% of the world's agricultural workforce, only 20% of landowners are women; women encounter more obstacles than men in accessing financial services, social protection and trade unions, and their salaries are on average 40% lower than those of men.

Many of them live in areas where access to health services, water and education is scarce and although they play an important role within their communities, they are subject to laws and social norms that discriminate against them and substantially reduce their participation in decision-making processes.

Among the tasks they perform are producing, processing, and selling agricultural products. In addition, they do household chores, look after the family and the community without any kind of remuneration.

== Objectives ==
Celebrated for the first time in 2008, after official recognition by the UN, it promotes and recognizes the role that rural women play in food security and the eradication of rural poverty and, consequently, are essential for the achievement of the Sustainable Development Goals defined by the United Nations.

At the same time, it seeks to raise awareness and alert the community to their situation and the difficulties they face.
