= Menggie Cobarrubias =

Filipino actor (1951–2020)

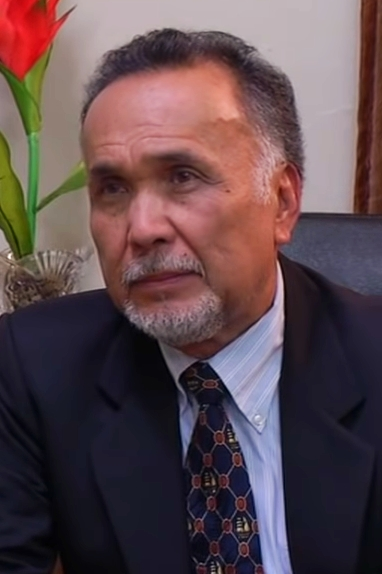
- Cobarrubias in 2017
- Born: August 10, 1951
- Died: March 26, 2020 (aged 68)
- Occupation: Actor
- Years active: 1976–2020

Domingo "Menggie" Cobarrubias (August 10, 1951 – March 26, 2020) was a Filipino actor who appeared in approximately 200 television shows and films.

Cobarrubias received a Gawad Urian Award for Best Supporting Actor for his role in the 1979 film Jaguar. He also won the Best Actor award in the 2014 QCinema International Film Festival for his performance in Mauban: Ang Resiko.

== Death ==
Cobarrubias died on March 26, 2020, from complications of pneumonia, at the age of 68. Before his death, a COVID-19 test was administered. On April 1, 2020, five days after his death, his test came back positive for the disease.

== Filmography ==
=== Film ===
Year	Title	Role	Notes
1976	Sakada	Andres	
1979	Jaguar	Sonny Gaston	Won Gawad Urian Award for Best Supporting Actor
1984	Soltero		
1989	Fight for Us	Human rights lawyer	
1991	Sa Kabila ng Lahat	Eugene	
1995	Sabado Nights	Politician	
1996	Cedie	Newick	
1996	Nag-iisang Ikaw	Tony	
1997	Calvento Files: The Movie	Atty. Serrano	"Inay, May Mumu!" segment
1997	The Sarah Balabagan Story	Atty. Digs Dilangalen	
1998	Bata, Bata... Pa'no Ka Ginawa?	Mr. Olivarez	
1998	Hiling	Atty. Minggoy	
1999	Asin at Paminta	Garcia	
2000	Deathrow	Congressman Ravela	
2000	Ping Lacson: Super Cop	Senator Raul Roco	
2002	9 Mornings	Atty. Bello	
2002	Bahid	Publisher	
2002	Hula Mo, Huli Ko	Chief Veloso	
2002	Mano Po	Bernie	
2003	Asboobs: Asal Bobo	Chief Pipay	
2004	Mano Po 3: My Love	Anciano	
2004	Aishite Imasu 1941: Mahal Kita	Panotes	
2004	Spirit of the Glass	Caloy	
2005	Mano Po 4: Ako Legal Wife	Edmond	
2005	Let the Love Begin	Investor	
2006	Pacquiao: The Movie	Manny Pacquiao's Filipino Lawyer	
2006	Mano Po 5: Gua Ai Di	Recording producer	
2006	Shake, Rattle and Roll 8	Chief of police	"LRT" segment
2007	Paano Kita Iibigin	Leon	
2008	Scaregivers	Jewelry shop manager	
2009	Manila	Hector	
2012	Graceland	Manuel Changho	
2012	Mater Dolorosa	Mayor	
2013	Tuhog	Bert	
2013	Sana Dati	Pastor	
2013	Tinik		
2013	Kimmy Dora: Ang Kiyemeng Prequel	Board member	
2013	Babagwa	Marney's father	
2014	Mauban: Ang Resiko		Won Best Actor award in QCinema International Film Festival
2014	Tres		"Tata Selo" segment
2015	Crazy Beautiful You	Lolo Ponchong	
2015	The Breakup Playlist	Gino's dad	
2015	Chain Mail	Mr. Mariano	
2015	Ex with Benefits	Dean	
2015	Heneral Luna	Cabinet member (Communication)	
2015	Etiquette for Mistresses	Dr. Santiago	
2015	Felix Manalo	Teodoro Briones	
2015	The Prenup	Lawyer of Cayabyab family	
2015	Beauty and the Bestie	Eddie	
2016	A Lullaby to the Sorrowful Mystery	Padre Florentino	
2016	Whistleblower		
2016	Echorsis	Kristoff's father	
2016	T.P.O.		
2016	Kabisera	Dado	
2017	100 Tula Para Kay Stella	Stratus CEO	
2017	Moonlight Over Baler		
2017	Seven Sundays	Dr. Nelson	
2018	K9	Congressman Montoya	
2018	Kung Paano Hinihintay ang Dapithapon	Celso	
2018	Signal Rock	Mayor	
2018	1957	Don Jose	
2018	Class of 2018	Senator	
2018	Eerie	Police chief	
2019	Bato (The General Ronald dela Rosa Story)		
2019	Last Fool Show	Mr. Estrella	
2019	Just a Stranger	Governor Roy	
2019	Tabon		
2019	Finding You	Dr. Kahler	
2019	The Mall, the Merrier!	Doctor	
2019	Maledicto	Cardinal Martinez	
2020	Suarez: The Healing Priest	Doctor	Final film appearance
2023	Ang Mga Kaibigan ni Mama Susan	Dean	Posthumous release

=== Television ===
Year	Title	Role
1999–2001	Rio del Mar	Pio
2001	Sa Puso Ko Iingatan Ka	Ramil
2002	Recuerdo de Amor	Atty. Montinola
2004–2005	Krystala	Atty. Amado Salvador
2007	Maria Flordeluna	General Torres
2008	Kung Fu Kids	Sen. Federico Alvarez
2008	E.S.P.	
2008	Babangon Ako't Dudurugin Kita	Don Pepito
2009	Sine Novela Presents: Paano Ba ang Mangarap?	
2009	Totoy Bato	Barrio Grapas mayor
2009	Midnight DJ: Ganti ng Kariton	Atty. Artemio Garcia
2009	Tayong Dalawa	Lola Get's Doctor
2009	Komiks Presents: Nasaan Ka, Maruja?	Alfred Rivera
2010	Tanging Yaman	
2010	Kung Tayo'y Magkakalayo	Astrud's Medical Doctor
2010	Precious Hearts Romances Presents: Impostor	Don Manuel Aguilar
2010	Imortal	Jessie Cordero
2011	Alakdana	Vergel's father
2011	Green Rose	Atty. Rogelio Yumul
2012	Walang Hanggan	John Bonifacio
2012	Wansapanataym Presents: Trick or Trixie	Don Jose Reyes
2012	Valiente	Mayor Manding
2012	Broken Vow	Mario Jimeno
2012	My Daddy Dearest	Juancho
2012	Precious Hearts Romances Presents: Pintada	Melencio
2012	A Beautiful Affair	Julio Santillian
2013	Bukod Kang Pinagpala	Ramon Alcuar
2013	Muling Buksan ang Puso	Arturo Rivera
2013	Mundo Mo'y Akin	Cong. Ramon Borja
2013	Apoy sa Dagat	
2013	Bukas na Lang Kita Mamahalin	
2014	Innamorata	Don Fernan Miranda
2014	Ikaw Lamang	Priest
2014	Moon of Desire	Dr. Andrada
2014	Ang Dalawang Mrs. Real	Isabello delos Reyes
2014	Sa Puso ni Dok	Dr. dela Cruz
2014	Wattpad Presents: Mr. Popular Meets Ms. Nobody 2 (Still in Love)	Dean Alfonso
2014	Pure Love	Dr. James Young
2015	Baker King	Attorney Mendoza
2015	Pasión de Amor	Eduvina's doctor
2015	Bridges of Love	Chairman Luna
2016	Ang Panday	Old Damian
2016	Conan, My Beautician	Don Alfonso
2016	Magpahanggang Wakas	Atty. Galvez
2017	Legally Blind	Anton Villareal
2017	FPJ's Ang Probinsyano	Cardo's defense lawyer
2017	Wildflower	Atty. Sebastian
2019	Sino ang Maysala?: Mea Culpa	Lordivino Mamaril
2019	The General's Daughter	Mayor Manuel Sta. Maria
2020	Beautiful Justice	President Ricardo San Jose (in his final appearance)

=== Theatre ===
Year	Title	Role	Notes
2012	Forsaken House		
