= Fight for Us =

1989 political thriller film by Lino Brocka

- Directed by: Lino Brocka
- Written by: Jose F. Lacaba
- Produced by: Salvatore Picciotto; Giancarlo Parretti; Leonardo de la Fuente
- Starring: Phillip Salvador; Dina Bonnevie; Gina Alajar; Bembol Roco
- Cinematography: Rody Lacap
- Edited by: George Jarlego; Sabine Mamou; Bob Wade
- Music by: Hubert Bougis; Hugo Crotti
- Production companies: Bernadette Associates International; Special People Productions
- Distributed by: Pathé; Cannon Films
- Release date: May 20, 1989
- Running time: 125 minutes
- Country: Philippines
- Language: Filipino

Fight for Us (titled Orapronobis in the Philippines) is a 1989 Philippine political thriller film directed by Lino Brocka and written by Jose F. Lacaba. Starring Phillip Salvador, Dina Bonnevie, Gina Alajar, and Bembol Roco, the story follows a former priest-turned-rebel who, after being freed in February 1986, becomes disillusioned as the Aquino administration authorizes military-backed paramilitary cults to propagate terror and violence.

Fight for Us premiered out of competition at the 42nd Cannes Film Festival on May 11, 1989. For its French release, the original title of Orapronobis was changed due to its religious overtones. In the Philippines, the film was heavily denounced by government officials for its subversive message that criticized the Aquino administration; it was never given a theatrical run in the country due to local censors.

In 2026, the film was digitally restored and remastered by Cité de Mémoire, and the restoration efforts were funded by the Film Development Council of the Philippines. The restored 4K version premiered in Portugal on October 21, 2026, as part of Doclisboa's Lino Brocka Retrospective.

== Plot ==
In 1985, in the remote town of Santa Filomena, a violent cult known as the Orapronobis, led by Kumander Kontra, murders a foreign priest after administering last rites to a suspected rebel, who is also executed.

Following the victory of the People Power Revolution in February 1986, political prisoners celebrated the demise of the Marcos regime. Among those released is Jimmy Cordero, a former priest who became involved in the underground revolutionary movement. Soon after, Jimmy marries Trixie, a human rights advocate, and starts working as a civil liberties defender.

Despite Trixie's objections, Jimmy and her brother Roland visit Santa Filomena to investigate another Orapronobis-related atrocity. During the trip, Jimmy reconnects with his former lover, Esper, and learns that they have a son, Camilo. The former lovers decide to conceal Jimmy's revolutionary past from their son.

The Orapronobis, aided by members of the military, escalate their terror operations in the community. Jimmy and his companions assist the terrified residents in fleeing first to the local church and then to Manila. When Jimmy returns to the capital, he rejects an old associate's offer to rejoin the underground resistance. Shortly after, Jimmy and Roland are ambushed; Jimmy survives, but Roland is killed. Trixie gives birth to their son while Jimmy is still recovering. At the same time, soldiers raid a refugee camp with the help of a masked informant, accusing several villagers of being rebels. Displaced residents and human rights activists speak out against the abuses in front of the authorities.

The violence escalates after Esper and Camilo are kidnapped by the Orapronobis. Kumander Kontra brutally beats Esper in front of her son after suspecting her of aiding the rebels. Esper, desperate to defend herself, fires at Kontra. Furious, he fires indiscriminately, killing Esper, Camilo, and several detained villagers. Later, the military returns the bodies to the town, and Jimmy mourns the deaths of Esper and Camilo. The story concludes with Jimmy contacting his former colleagues in the underground movement.

== Cast ==
- Phillip Salvador as Jimmy Cordero
- Dina Bonnevie as Trixie Cordero
- Gina Alajar as Esper
- Bembol Roco as Kumander Kontra
- Abbo dela Cruz as Django
- Pen Medina as Chief Sparrow
- Joel Lamangan as Col. Mateo
- Gerard Bernschein as Father Jeff
- Ernie Zarate as Bishop Romero
- Jess Ramos as Capt. Sumilang
- Obby Castañeda as Politician 1
- Pocholo Montes as Politician 2
- Ben Vibar as TV Newscaster 1
- Raquel Villavicencio as TV Newscaster 2
- Joe Taruc as TV Reporter 1
- Dodie Lacuna as TV Reporter 2
- Thea Cleofe Salvador as Government Representative
- Archie Adamos as Henchman
- Fred Capulong as Henchman
- Rene Hawkins as Henchman
- Esther Chavez as Mrs. Medina
- Estrella Kuenzler as Mrs. Cordero
- Ruben Rustia as Monsignor
- Apo Chua as Jun Lazaro
- Tess Dumpit as Malou Lazaro
- Raquel Tan as Secretary
- Suzette Rigor as Midwife
- William Lorenzo as Roland
- Mae Quesada as Volunteer
- Ramon Hodel as Volunteer
- Lito Tiongeon as Volunteer
- Mad Nicolas as Volunteer
- Nanding Josef as Volunteer
- Roger Moring as Orapronobis Death Squad
- Boy Roque as Orapronobis Death Squad
- Jun Nido as Orapronobis Death Squad
- Emil Estrada as Orapronobis Death Squad
- Ver De Guzman as Orapronobis Death Squad
- Ray Ventura as Refugee
- Connie Chua as Refugee
- RR Herrera as Camilo
- Beth Mondragon as Refugee
- Evelyn Vargas as Refugee
- Raul Alfonso as Refugee
- Ernie Cloma as Refugee
- Chie Concepcion as Refugee
- Bituin Rada as Refugee
- Malou de Guzman as Refugee
- Atong Redillas as Refugee
- Dante Balaois as Refugee
- Jovy Zarrate as Refugee
- Suyen Chua as Refugee
- Rody Vera as Terrorist
- Carol Villena as Terrorist
- Mina Nicolas as Terrorist
- Elson Montalbo as Terrorist
- Arthur Venegas as Terrorist
- Benjie Ledesma as Terrorist
- Menggie Cobarrubias as Human Rights Lawyer
- Ellen Ongkeko as Human Rights Lawyer
- Khryss Adalia as Human Rights Lawyer
- Rey Malte-Cruz as Human Rights Lawyer
- William Tan as Photojournalist
- Ramon Acasio as Photojournalist
- Jojo de Guzman as Photojournalist
- Arman Son as Photojournalist
- Peter Carillo as Photojournalist
- Vilma Deonio as Photojournalist
- Roger Escleto as Photojournalist
- Gil Martea as Photojournalist
- Mark Moncado as Photojournalist
- John Arcilla as Photojournalist
- Jenina Limlengco as Photojournalist

== See also ==
- Mendiola massacre – 1987 mass killing of political protesters in Manila
