= Pete Lacaba =

Filipino writer

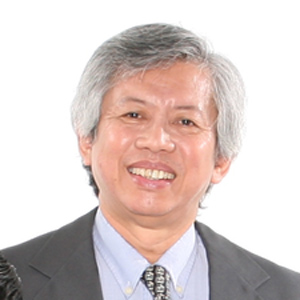
- Born: Jose Maria Flores Lacaba; November 25, 1945 (age 80); Cagayan de Oro, Misamis Oriental, Commonwealth of the Philippines
- Other names: Pepito, Brader, Boo Rader
- Education: Ateneo de Manila University (BA)
- Occupations: Screen writer, editor, journalist
- Years active: 1950–present
- Spouse: Marra PL. Lanot
- Children: Crisanto Malaya Lacaba
- Parent(s): Jose Montreal Lacaba; Fe Flores
- Relatives: Eman Lacaba (brother)
- Awards: Cinemanila International Film Festival conferred the 2008 Lifetime Achievement Award

Jose Maria Flores Lacaba (born November 25, 1945), also known as Pete Lacaba, is a Filipino screenwriter, editor, poet, journalist, activist and translator.

== Early life ==
Born in Misamis Oriental in 1945 to Jose Monreal Lacaba of Loon, Bohol and Fe Flores from Pateros, Rizal. He is the brother of writer and activist Eman Lacaba, who was murdered in March 1976 and later honored at the Philippines' Bantayog ng mga Bayani memorial as a martyr who fought the Marcos dictatorship.

== Early career ==
He is also well known for his role in the fight against President Ferdinand Marcos and his US-backed military dictatorship during the Philippines' martial law era. Among his most notable works during this time are his coverage of the First Quarter Storm protests for the Philippines Free Press magazine, which were compiled into the book Days of Disquiet, Nights of Rage in 1982, and the controversial poem "Prometheus Unbound," an acrostic poem through which he managed to trick the publishers of a pro-Marcos magazine to publish a secretly anti-Marcos message.

Lacaba has been especially recognized for his coverage of the First Quarter Storm, an anti-Marcos movement, in 1970. His firsthand account of the events of the First Quarter Storm protests, Days of Disquiet, Nights of Rage (1982), compiled from articles first published in the Philippine Free Press and the Asia-Philippines Leader magazines, are considered important accounts of that period.

Another influential work Lacaba wrote during this period, under the nom de plume Ruben Cuevas, was the poem "Prometheus Unbound," which was published by Focus, a magazine allied with the Marcos regime. The editors did not immediately realize that the work was an acrostic poem, whose first letters spelled out the popular protest slogan "Marcos Hitler Diktador Tuta" (Marcos, Hitler, Dictator, Lapdog).

== Later career ==
Lacaba is recognized as one of the leading figures in Philippine literature today. He is well known in various fields, including creative writing, journalism, editing and scriptwriting.

He worked with well-known directors like Lino Brocka and Mike de Leon in producing films that expose ordinary people's lives that experienced poverty and injustice. His screenplay credits include Jaguar, which competed at the Cannes International Film Festival in 1980, while Bayan Ko: Kapit sa Patalim competed in 1984. Orapronobis was screened out of competition in 1989. Ricky Lee co-wrote Jaguar with Lacaba.

He continued writing poems, and in 1999, was decorated as one of 100 "Bayani ng Sining". Lacaba's poetry has been compiled in collections which include Ang Mga Kagilagilalas na Pakikipagsapalaran ni Juan de la Cruz (1979), Sa Daigdig ng Kontradiksyon (1991) and Sa Panahon ng Ligalig (1991).

Lacaba is currently the executive editor of Summit Media's YES! magazine, the sister publication of PEP.

In honor of Lacaba for being the 2008 Lifetime Achievement Awardee, the classic film Bayan Ko was screened as the closing film of Dekada Cinemanila. According to Anima Aguiluz, the daughter of Direk Tikoy and festival programmer of Cinemanila, Bayan Ko could be found in Toronto, Canada.

== Works ==
=== Screenwriter ===
- Jaguar (1979)
- Angela Markado (1980; as Jose Lacaba)
- Pakawalan Mo Ako (1981)
- Boatman (1984; additional dialogue)
- Sister Stella L. (1984)
- Experience (1984)
- This Is My Country (1985)
- Victor Corpuz (1987) (writer)... aka Get Victor Corpus: The Rebel Soldier (Philippines: English title)
- Fight for Us (1989) (writer)... aka Fight for Us... aka Insoumis, Les (France)
- Eskapo (1995) (screenplay) ... aka Escape (Philippines: English title: literal title)
- Bagong Bayani (1995) (writer)... aka A New Hero (Philippines: English title)... aka Flor Contemplacion's Last Wish ... aka Unsung Heroine (USA)
- Segurista (1996) (writer)... aka Dead Sure ... aka The Insurance Agent (International: English title)
- Rizal sa Dapitan (1997) (screenplay)... aka Rizal in Dapitan
- Tatsulok (1998) (writer) ... aka Triangle (International: English title)

Miscellaneous crew

- Imelda (2003) (translator: dialogue) (as Jose Lacaba)

Soundtrack

- Sister Stella L. (1984) (lyrics: "Sangandaan," "Aling Pag-ibig Pa?")

Self

- Imelda (2003) (as Pete Lacaba) .... Himself

== Discography ==
- Tagubilin at Habilin (2003, Viva Records)
- Prometheus Unbound

== Awards and achievements ==
Gawad CCP Para sa Sining

- CCP Award For Arts, for outstanding work as a poet, essayist, screenwriter, and journalist, contributing to the development of Philippine literature, 2024

Star Awards for Movies

- (Nominated) Original Screenplay of the Year for Segurista (1996) shared with Amable Aguiluz and Amado Lacuesta, 1997
- Star Award, Adapted Screenplay of the Year for Rizal sa Dapitan (1997), 1998

Metro Manila Film Festival

- Festival Prize, Best Screenplay for Rizal sa Dapitan (1997)

Gawad Urian Awards

- Best Screenplay (Pinakamahusay na Dulang Pampelikula) for Jaguar (1979) shared with Ricardo Lee, 1980
- Best Screenplay (Pinakamahusay na Dulang Pampelikula) for Sister Stella L. (1984) shared with Jose Almojuela Mike De Leon, 1985
- Best Screenplay (Pinakamahusay na Dulang Pampelikula) for Bayan ko: Kapit sa patalim (1985), 1986
- (Nominated) Best Screenplay (Pinakamahusay na Dulang Pampelikula) for Bagong bayani (1995, 1996)
- Best Screenplay (Pinakamahusay na Dulang Pampelikula) for Segurista (1996) shared with Amable Aguiluz Amado Lacuesta, 1997

FAP Awards, Philippines

- Best Story Adaptation for Bayan ko: Kapit sa patalim (1985), 1986

FAMAS Awards

- Best Screenplay for Rizal sa Dapitan (1997), 1998

Cinemanila International Film Festival

- The 10th edition of the Cinemanila International Film Festival conferred the 2008 Lifetime Achievement Award to screenplay writer Jose "Pete" Lacaba Jr.

Other awards

- Lacaba received the Aruna Vasudev Lifetime Achievement Award at the 10th Osian's-Cinefan Festival of Arab and Asian Cinema in New Delhi, India.

== Trivia ==
- Jose Maria Flores Lacaba Jr. Usual byline: Jose F. Lacaba. The late Jose Sr. was nicknamed Pepe, so Jr. was nicknamed Pepito, the little Pepe. In college, Pepito's nickname got shortened to Pito, then Pit, but the last gave rise to jokes about armpits, so Pit was respelled Pete.
