= Lino Brocka =

Filipino film director (1939–1991)

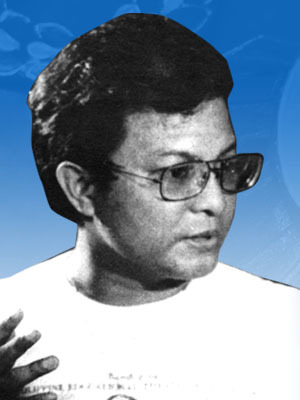
- An undated photo of Brocka
- Born: Catalino Ortiz Brocka; April 3, 1939; Pilar, Sorsogon, Commonwealth of the Philippines
- Died: May 22, 1991 (aged 52); Quezon City, Philippines
- Occupation: Film director
- Years active: 1970–1991
- Relatives: Q. Allan Brocka (nephew), A. Julian Brocka (cousin)
- Awards: Order of National Artists of the Philippines

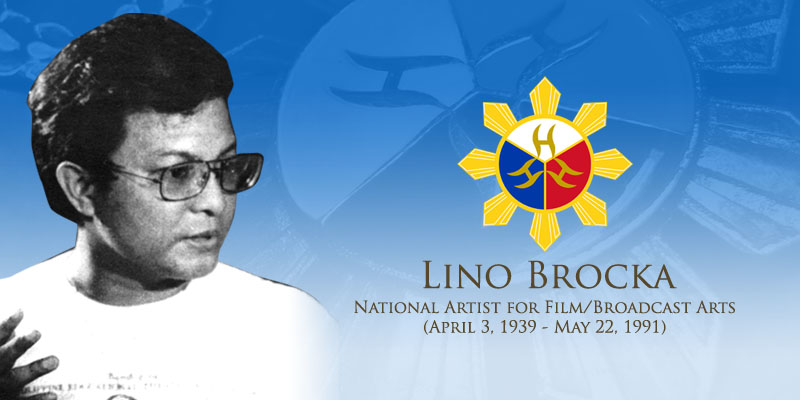
Cultural profile of Lino Brocka from the "Order of National Artists" (National Commission for Culture and the Arts)

Catalino Ortiz Brocka (April 3, 1939 – May 22, 1991) was a Filipino film director. He is widely regarded as one of the greatest and most important filmmakers in the history of Philippine cinema. Brocka directed over 60 films across two decades that span a variety of genres, with his acclaimed work combining elements of melodrama and social realism.

Brocka began his film career in 1970 by directing commercial genre films after a stint in theater and television. He first gained critical acclaim with Weighed But Found Wanting (1974) and Manila in the Claws of Light (1975), the latter of which is considered the greatest Filipino film of all time. Insiang (1976) was the first Philippine film to screen at Cannes Film Festival, followed by his other films Jaguar (1979) and This Is My Country (1984). Other notable films include Bona (1980), Cain and Abel (1982), Macho Dancer (1988), and Orapronobis (1989). While most of his films have critiqued the dictatorship of Philippine president Ferdinand Marcos and his wife Imelda Marcos, Brocka became politically active in his later years.

Brocka died on May 22, 1991, in a car accident. He was posthumously declared a National Artist of the Philippines in 1997.

== Early life and education ==
Brocka was born on April 3, 1939, in Pilar, Sorsogon. He was the first of two children of Regino Brocka and Pilar Ortiz. Brocka's father worked as a boat builder, was politically active, and was married to a schoolteacher. While on a trip to the province of Nueva Ecija, Regino met Pilar, then 15, and deserted his family to live with her on an island off the coast of Sorsogon. After Lino was born out of wedlock, Regino was charged with bigamy by his legal wife and was sentenced to two years at Muntinlupa Prison (later New Bilibid Prison) in Metro Manila, during which Lino's younger brother Danilo was born three years later. After Regino was released, the family returned to Sorsogon.

Regino became a defining influence in Brocka's early life. Lino later recalled: "I have vivid memories of my father because I had a very good, very, very happy childhood. The island was like that in Blue Lagoon, the film which starred Jean Simmons." When he was six, Regino was killed in a suspected political murder. Faced with the prospect of raising her children alone, Pilar sought help from her family in San Jose, Nueva Ecija, where she left Lino with her sister. Lino suffered abuse from his aunt for four years until he ran away to live with his mother, who later became an elementary school teacher. To make a living, Lino and his brother sold sampaguita necklaces at the public market, where he would sing a song and let his tears fall on cue, enticing the audience to buy the necklaces. Brocka later depicted his childhood experiences in his 1977 film Tahan Na Empoy, Tahan.

Brocka graduated from Nueva Ecija High School in Cabanatuan in 1956. He initially studied law at the University of the Philippines Diliman as a scholar, but later became a working student after losing his scholarship. Brocka applied at the drama club under Wilfrido Ma. Guerrero, but was rejected due to his thick accent and short height. Undeterred, he studied Hollywood films and learned how to speak in English until the drama club hired him as a stagehand.

Brocka first met future activist Behn Cervantes through the drama club. Cervantes introduced him to Mormon missionaries in 1961. Brocka dropped out of college, converted to Mormonism and went to Hawaii for a two-year mission. After finishing his missionary commitments, he attended the Mormon Church College of Hawaii for one semester. Brocka briefly stayed in the San Francisco Bay Area, where he worked as a bus boy and hospital orderly before returning to Manila in 1968 due to homesickness.

== Film career ==
=== 1970s ===
Brocka wrote press releases for a production company that filmed B movies in the Philippines. He was then introduced by Cervantes to Cecile Guidote-Alvarez, founder of the Philippine Educational Theater Association (PETA). Brocka established his career with PETA, where he ran errands, wrote scripts, and led theater exercises until he became a director of several episodes of PETA's TV show Balintataw.

In 1970, Brocka was approached by a producer with Lea Productions about making his first feature film. He wrote and directed Wanted: Perfect Mother, a musical based on the comics serial by Mars Ravelo. It won Best Screenplay at the 1970 Manila Film Festival. Brocka's next film, Santiago!, was a war film starring Fernando Poe Jr. and featured PETA actors in minor roles and as extras. He won the Best Director Award from Citizen's Council for Mass Media (CCMM). His third film in 1970, Tubog sa Ginto, starred Eddie Garcia as a closeted homosexual and was based on another Ravelo comic serial. An early landmark of LGBTQ representation in Philippine cinema, the film won Brocka the Best Director award at the 1971 FAMAS Awards. The following year, Brocka co-wrote and directed the showbiz drama Stardoom, which won him the Best Director award from CCMM. He also directed the romance drama Cadena de Amor in the same year, which won seven prizes from the Manila Film Festival. The musical Now! (1971) and the romance drama Cherry Blossoms (1972), partly shot in Japan and starring Nicholas Hammond, opened to negative reviews.

Brocka directed a total of nine films, six of them for Lea, until 1972, when he went on a self-imposed hiatus. He continued working for PETA and taught classes in film, drama and speech. Two years later, he established the production company Cinemanila, vowing to create substantive films. "There's too much fantasy in the movies, too much escapism," he said. "Philippine films are wanting in content; they need more realism."

For Cinemanila's first film, Brocka returned to filmmaking with Weighed But Found Wanting, released in 1974. Shot on location, it starred Christopher de Leon in his first film role and was written by Mario O'Hara, who also played the leper Berto in the film. Weighed became a box office success and earned Brocka another Best Director award at the 1975 FAMAS Awards. It also led Mike de Leon, whose family founded LVN Pictures, to approach Brocka about adapting the novel In the Claws of Brightness by Edgardo M. Reyes, with de Leon as producer and cinematographer and Clodualdo del Mundo Jr. writing the screenplay. The result, Manila in the Claws of Light (1975), starred Bembol Roco in his first film role and was also shot on location. It won nine awards at the 1976 FAMAS Awards. Brocka achieved international success with the film, which has since been considered the greatest Filipino film of all time and ushered in the Second Golden Age of Philippine Cinema.

Brocka's next film, Insiang (1976), starred Hilda Koronel as the titular character and Mona Lisa as her mother. The film faced censorship issues after First Lady Imelda Marcos objected to its depiction of the slums in Tondo, Manila, although her daughter Imee Marcos helped sponsor the film's domestic premiere. Insiang became the first Philippine film to be screened at the Cannes Film Festival, where it was placed in the Director's Fortnight section in 1978. It would later be considered one of Brocka's masterpieces.

In 1978, Brocka directed the comedian Dolphy as a gay beautician in Ang Tatay Kong Nanay, which became a commercial success and earned critical praise for Dolphy's performance.

Brocka made four films in 1979. Init starred Charito Solis, Rio Locsin, and frequent collaborator Phillip Salvador and was recut by censors for its sexual content, followed by Ina, Kapatid, Anak, a family drama starring Solis, Locsin, and Lolita Rodriguez. Jaguar, a neo noir crime film starring Salvador, was written by Pete Lacaba and Ricky Lee from the nonfiction story "The Boy Who Wanted to Become Society" by Nick Joaquin. It became the first Philippine film to compete for the Palme d'Or at the 1980 Cannes Film Festival. American film critic Andrew Sarris praised the film: "The most pleasant surprise of the Festival so far has been Lino Brocka's Jaguar, a socially conscious film noir from, of all places, the Philippines." Jaguar won Best Picture and Best Director at the 1980 FAMAS Awards, while also winning five Gawad Urian Awards. Ina Ka ng Anak Mo was Brocka's first of three collaborations with Nora Aunor.

=== 1980s ===
In 1980, Brocka collaborated with Aunor on two films, Nakaw Na Pag-ibig and Bona, the latter of which was screened at the 1981 Cannes Film Festival as part of the Director's Fortnight section. Also in 1980, Brocka reunited with Hilda Koronel and screenwriter Pete Lacaba on the rape revenge film Angela Markado, based on the comic serial by Carlo J. Caparas, which won top prize at the 1983 Three Continents Festival at Nantes, France.

In 1981, Brocka directed the film noir Caught in the Act, starring Salvador and Lorna Tolentino.

Brocka's 1982 action drama Cain and Abel was written by Ricky Lee and starred Christopher De Leon and Phillip Salvador as two warring brothers inspired by the titular characters from the Bible. In the same year, Brocka directed the sex comedy Palipat-lipat, Papalit-palit, depicting a love triangle between a couple (played by De Leon and Dina Bonnevie) and a homosexual (played by Mark Gil), and the romantic thriller PX, starring Koronel and Salvador.

In 1984, Brocka directed the political crime film This Is My Country from a screenplay by Lacaba. Co-financed by French and Philippine production companies and starring Salvador and Gina Alajar, it premiered at the 1984 Cannes Film Festival, where it competed for the Palme d'Or, but faced a legal battle with the local censors before its domestic release. In the same year, Brocka directed the domestic drama Adultery from a screenplay by Jose Javier Reyes, starring Vilma Santos and Salvador, and the thriller Experience, co-written by Lacaba and Roy C. Iglesias and starring Snooky Serna.

In 1985, Brocka directed the political coming of age film Miguelito: Batang Rebelde, starring Aga Muhlach in his first dramatic role. Released seven months after This Is My Country, it was more commercially successful than the latter and won awards. Brocka responded to the film's reception: "I cannot help it if I say I won for the wrong film when I won for Miguelito and not Kapit [My Own Country]...Because they missed the whole point of how I, as a director was trying to do Kapit."

In 1986, Brocka directed Napakasakit, Kuya Eddie, a family melodrama based on the song by Roel Cortez and inspired by the economic crisis at the time. He also served as a jury member at the 39th Cannes Film Festival.

In 1988, Brocka directed the musical drama Natutulog Pa ang Diyos, starring Gary Valenciano, and TV commercials for the Royal Tru soft drink. He used his earnings from these projects to fund his passion project, the erotic gay drama Macho Dancer. It first premiered at the 1988 Toronto International Film Festival to a positive reception, and its North American release led to the creation of the film distribution company Strand Releasing. However, it was heavily censored for its domestic release in January 1989, with Brocka smuggling an uncensored 35mm print to the Museum of Modern Art.

In 1989, Brocka directed the political thriller Orapronobis, his last film with Salvador. It was inspired by the then-ongoing vigilantism against suspected Communists in the Philippines. Orapronobis premiered at the 1989 Cannes Film Festival and was released in French cinemas as Les Insoumis and internationally as Fight for Us. Variety regarded the film as "perhaps even more violent and angrier than the films he [Brocka] made under the Marcos dictatorship." Brocka faced attacks from chief of censors Manuel Morato, who withheld the permit for the film's domestic release in part due to its subversive content.

=== 1990-1991 ===
In the last two years of his life, Brocka directed the political melodramas Gumapang Ka sa Lusak (1990) and Sa Kabila ng Lahat (1991) for Viva Films. Both films starred Dina Bonnevie and became critical and commercial successes. Brocka died six days after the premiere of Sa Kabila ng Lahat. His final films released after his death include the melodramas Kislap sa Dilim, starring Christopher de Leon, Lorna Tolentino, and Gabby Concepcion, and Makiusap Ka sa Diyos, starring De Leon, Concepcion, and Ruffa Gutierrez.

In 1990, Brocka contributed to the UNICEF-produced anthology film How Are the Kids? with the seven-minute segment "Oca", about child labor in the fishing industry. The film also included segments by Jerry Lewis and Jean-Luc Godard.

=== Unrealized projects ===
In 1988, Brocka was in talks to adapt Bienvenido Santos's short story collection Scent of Apples (1979). The following year, he was also slated to direct a biopic of South African boxer Arthur Mayisela titled The Basement, to be shot in Zimbabwe as a French and British production, until it was shelved by Columbia Pictures.

Before his death, Brocka planned to direct Misererenobis, a follow-up to Orapronobis in a planned trilogy of films about human rights set during and after Marcos's presidency. He was also scheduled to start filming Huwag Mong Salingin ang Sugat Ko, a modern interpretation of Jose Rizal's novel Noli Me Tangere written by Ricky Lee, in Palawan; it was later completed and released in 1991 with lead actor Christopher De Leon credited as director.

== Political period ==
In the early 1980s, Brocka lobbied with the film and arts community to protest the planned expansion of censorship laws, leading to the formation of the Free the Artist Movement in 1983, later renamed to Concerned Artists of the Philippines. He also became a vocal critic of First Lady Imelda Marcos.

After the assassination of opposition leader Benigno Aquino Jr. in 1983, Brocka recalled his reaction: "That was the turning point for a lot of people. It shocked the country. The moderates, the silent, the indifferent were so shocked; it brought us together." He joined the executive committee of Justice for Aquino, Justice for All and helped organize political rallies, some of which were later shown in This Is My Country.

On January 28, 1985, Brocka and Behn Cervantes were arrested during a nationwide jeepney strike. They were charged for organizing an illegal assembly and denied bail, although they both stated that they were attending in sympathy with the drivers. They were released after 16 days. Brocka joined the Coalition for the Restoration of Democracy after his release.

In 1986, after President Marcos was ousted and exiled at the end of People Power Revolution, Brocka was appointed by his successor Corazon Aquino to the 1986 Constitutional Commission to help draft a new constitution. He resigned after four months, citing his disillusionment with the commission's realpolitik approach, although he contributed the phrase "freedom of expression" into the constitution's bill of rights. Three years later, Brocka criticized the Aquino government in a press conference for the Cannes screening of Orapronobis, stating: "We are still facing the same problems today. There is poverty, hunger, corruption, repression and ongoing human rights violations, none of that has changed even though now we enjoy a democratic space."

Before his death, Brocka campaigned for the removal of U.S. military bases in the Philippines.

== Personal life and death ==
Brocka was openly gay and declared his homosexuality in Christian Blackwood's 1987 documentary Signed: Lino Brocka.

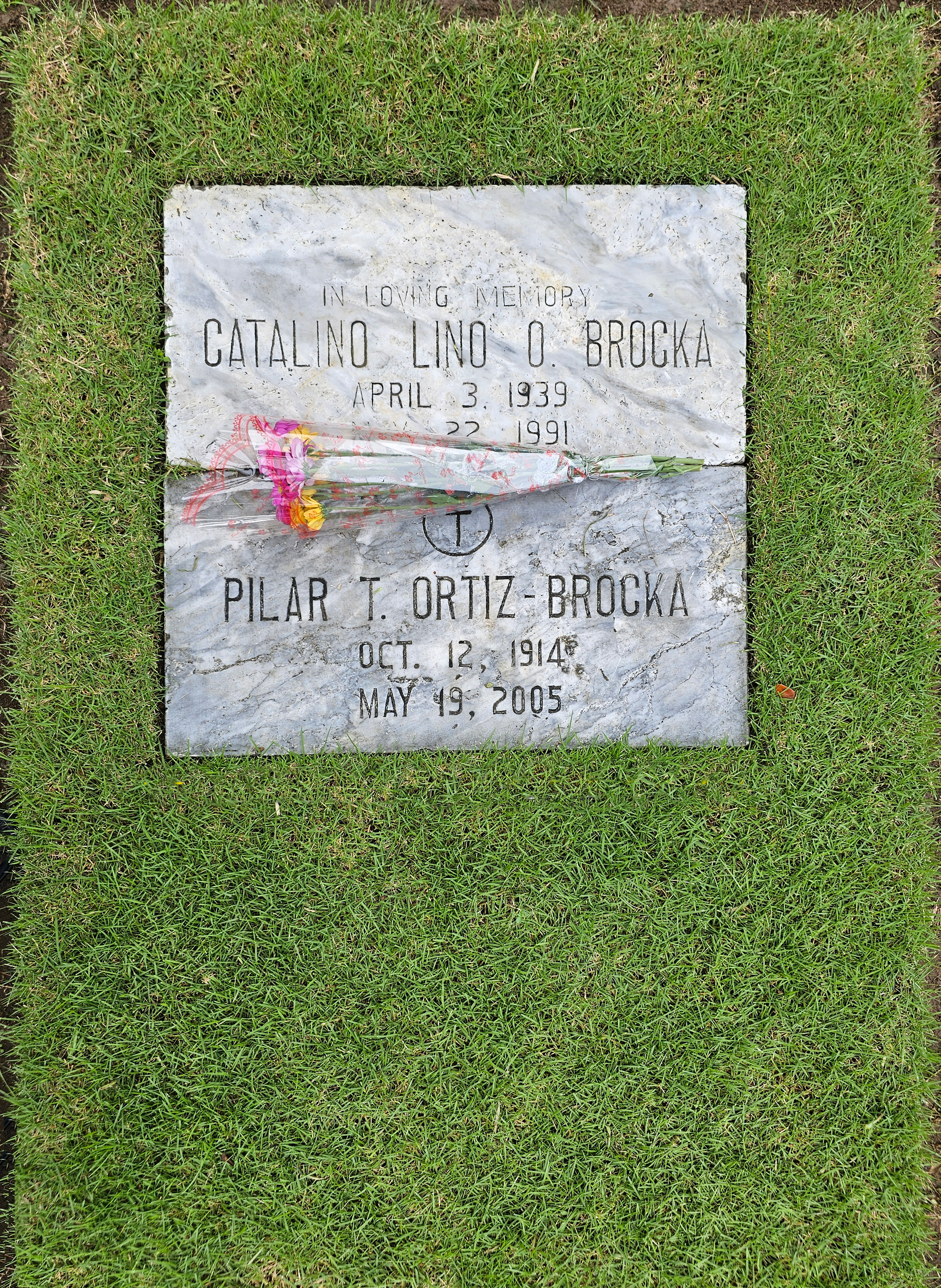
Lino's grave

On May 22, 1991, Brocka and actor William Lorenzo left the Spindle Music Lounge, where they watched a show starring Malu Barry, in a 1991 Toyota Corolla driven by Lorenzo and heading home to Tandang Sora Avenue in Quezon City. At around 1:30am, the car crashed into an electric pole along East Avenue after Lorenzo tried to avoid a tricycle in their path. Both Brocka and Lorenzo were rushed to East Avenue Medical Center, where Brocka was pronounced dead on arrival, while Lorenzo suffered leg injuries but later recovered.

Brocka was buried with his mother at Himlayang Pilipino Memorial Park in Tandang Sora Avenue, Quezon City.

== Legacy ==
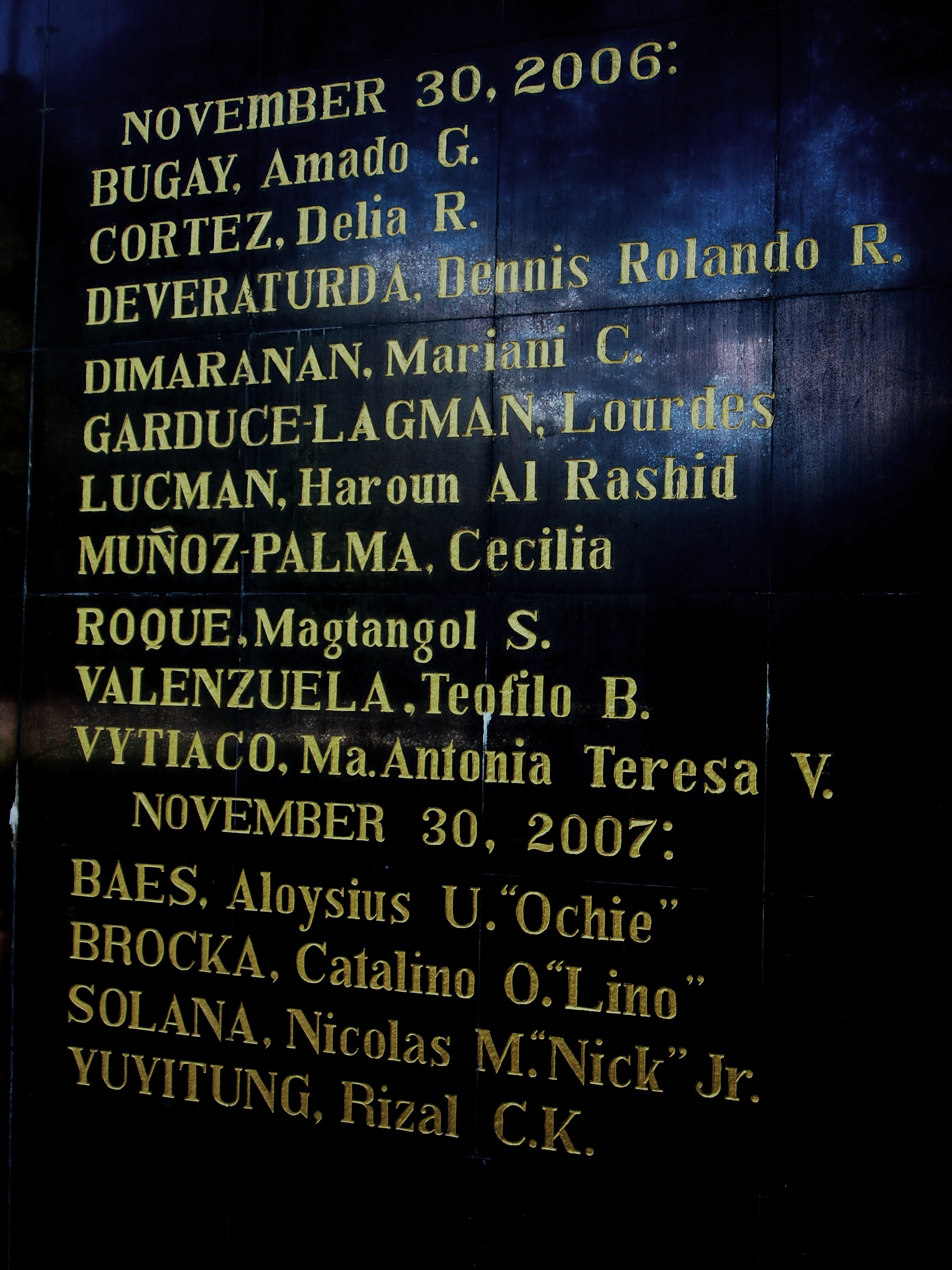
Detail of the Wall of Remembrance at the Bantayog ng mga Bayani, showing names from the 2007 batch of Bantayog Honorees, including that of Lino Brocka.

In 1985, Brocka was awarded the Ramon Magsaysay Award for Journalism, Literature and Creative Communication Arts for "making cinema a vital social commentary, awakening public consciousness to disturbing realities of life among the Filipino poor".

In 1997, Brocka was posthumously declared a National Artist of the Philippines for Film. His name is included on Bantayog ng mga Bayani's Wall of Remembrance, which recognizes heroes and martyrs who fought against martial law in the Philippines.

Lav Diaz has cited Brocka as an influence and has portrayed him (played by film critic and scholar Gino Dormiendo) in his 2004 film Evolution of a Filipino Family. Bong Joon-ho cited Brocka as an Asian director he admired: "He was a strong master. He made such powerful films. I was in a cinema club when I was in university, so I studied so many wonderful Asian films at the time." Isabel Sandoval described Brocka as "the apotheosis of Philippine seventies social realism in cinema". Sean Baker expressed his admiration of Brocka and his film Bona when it was restored in 2024: "It's a very powerful film. The lead, Nora [Aunor], is incredible in it. So, I'm really happy that it'll be getting a new life and because it really deserves an audience."

In 2023, Khavn premiered his experimental biopic on Brocka, National Anarchist: Lino Brocka, at the International Film Festival Rotterdam.

== Filmography ==
=== As director and writer ===
Year	English title	Original title	Director	Writer	Notes
1970	Wanted: Perfect Mother	-	Yes	Yes	First film; based on the comic serial by Mars Ravelo
1970	The Arizona Kid	-	No	Yes	Directed by Luciano B. Carlos
1970	Santiago!	-	Yes	Yes	
1970	Dipped in Gold	Tubog sa Ginto	Yes	Yes	Based on the comic series by Mars Ravelo
1971	Now	-	Yes	Yes	Lost film
1971		Lumuha Pati Mga Anghel	Yes	No	Credited as Lino O. Brocka
1971	Cadena de amor	-	Yes	No	Credited as Lino Brocka Ortiz
1971	Stardoom	-	Yes	No	
1972	Villa Miranda	-	Yes	No	
1972	Cherry Blossoms	-	Yes	Yes	Lost film
1974	Weighed but Found Wanting	Tinimbang Ka Ngunit Kulang	Yes	Yes	
1974	Three, Two, One	Tatlo, Dalawa, Isa	Yes	No	Anthology film
1975	Manila in the Claws of Light	Maynila sa Mga Kuko ng Liwanag	Yes	No	Based on the novel In the Claws of Brightness by Edgardo M. Reyes
1975		Dung-aw	Yes	No	Musical adaptation of the life of Filipina heroine Gabriela Silang
1976		Lunes, Martes, Miyerkules, Huwebes, Biyernes, Sabado, Linggo	Yes	Yes	Lost film
1976	Insiang	-	Yes	No	Screened under Directors’ Fortnight at the 1978 Cannes Film Festival
1977		Tahan Na, Empoy, Tahan	Yes	No	
1977		Inay	Yes	No	
1977		Tadhana: Ito ang Lahing Pilipino	Yes	No	Segment "The Reform Movement" Unreleased
1978		Mananayaw	Yes	No	
1978	My Father, My Mother	Ang Tatay Kong Nanay	Yes	No	
1978	Wake Up, Maruja	Gumising Ka… Maruja	Yes	No	Based on the novel Maruja by Mars Ravelo
1978		Hayop sa Hayop	Yes	No	
1978	Rubia Servios	-	Yes	No	Based on the short story "Unforgettable Legal Story" by Aida Sevilla Mendoza
1979		Init	Yes	Yes	
1979		Ina, Kapatid, Anak	Yes	No	
1979	Jaguar	-	Yes	No	Based on the 1961 essay “The Boy Who Wanted to Become Society” by Nick Joaquin; screened in competition at the 1980 Cannes Film Festival
1979	Whore of a Mother	Ina Ka ng Anak Mo	Yes	No	Official entry to the 1979 Metro Manila Film Festival
1980	Stolen Love	Nakaw Na Pag-Ibig	Yes	No	
1980	Angela Markado	-	Yes	No	
1980	Bona	-	Yes	No	Screened under Directors Fortnight at the 1981 Cannes Film Festival; Returned as part of Cannes Classics at the 2024 Cannes Film Festival
1981		Kontrobersyal!	Yes	No	
1981		Burgis	Yes	No	
1981	Hello, Young Lovers	-	Yes	No	
1981		Dalaga si Misis, Binata si Mister	Yes	No	
1981	Caught in the Act	-	Yes	No	
1982	PX	-	Yes	No	
1982	In This Corner	In Dis Korner	Yes	No	
1982		Palipat-lipat, Papalit-palit	Yes	No	
1982	Mother Dear	-	Yes	No	
1982	Cain and Abel	Cain at Abel	Yes	No	
1983	Strangers in Paradise	-	Yes	No	
1983	Hot Property	-	Yes	No	
1984	This Is My Country	Bayan Ko: Kapit sa Patalim	Yes	No	Screened in competition at the 1984 Cannes Film Festival
1984	Adultery	-	Yes	No	
1984		Akin ang Iyong Katawan	Yes	No	
1984	Experience	-	Yes	No	
1985	Miguelito	Miguelito: Batang Rebelde	Yes	No	
1985	White Slavery	-	Yes	No	
1985		Ano ang Kulay ng Mukha ng Diyos?	Yes	No	
1986		Napakasakit, Kuya Eddie	Yes	No	
1987	Be Only Mine	Maging Akin Ka Lamang	Yes	No	Remade in 2008 as a TV series for GMA Network
1987		Pasan Ko ang Daigdig	Yes	No	Remade in 2007 as a TV series for GMA Network
1988	Three Faces of Love	Tatlong Mukha ng Pag-Ibig	Yes	No	Anthology film with Emmanuel Borlaza and Leroy Salvador; segment: "Ang Silid" (lit. "The Room")
1988	Macho Dancer	-	Yes	No	Screened out of competition at the 1988 Toronto International Film Festival
1988	God Is Still Sleeping	Natutulog Pa ang Diyos	Yes	No	Based on the novel by Ruben R. Marcelino; remade in 2007 as a TV series for ABS-CBN
1989		Kailan Mahuhugasan ang Kasalanan?	Yes	No	
1989	Fight for Us	Orapronobis	Yes	No	Screened out of competition at the 1989 Cannes Film Festival
1989		Babangon Ako't Dudurugin Kita	Yes	No	Remade in 2008 as a TV series by GMA Network
1990		Kung tapos na ang kailanman	Yes	No	
1990	Dirty Affair	Gumapang Ka Sa Lusak	Yes	No	Remade in 2010 as a TV series by GMA Network
1990	All Be Damned	Hahamakin Lahat	Yes	No	
1990	Victim	Biktima	Yes	No	
1990		Ama… Bakit Mo Ako Pinabayaan?	Yes	No	
1990	How Are the Kids?	-	Yes	No	Anthology film with Jean-Luc Godard, Jerry Lewis, Anne-Marie Miéville, Rolan Bykov, Ciro Durán, and Euzhan Palcy; segment: "Oca"
1991	In Spite of Everything	Sa Kabila ng Lahat	Yes	No	
1991	Spark in the Dark	Kislap sa Dilim	Yes	No	
1991	A Plea to God	Makiusap Ka sa Diyos	Yes	No	Final film
1991		Huwag Mong Salingin ang Sugat Ko	No	Yes	Directed by Christopher de Leon
1992	Lucia	-	No	Yes	Directed by Mel Chionglo

== Accolades ==
Year	Group	Category	Work	Result
1984	British Film Institute Awards	Sutherland Trophy	Bayan Ko: Kapit Sa Patalim	Won
1984	Cannes Film Festival	Palme d'Or	Bayan Ko: Kapit Sa Patalim	Nominated
1980	Cannes Film Festival	Palme d'Or	Jaguar	Nominated
1992	FAMAS Awards	Hall of Fame	Director	Won
1991	FAMAS Awards	Best Director	Gumapang Ka Sa Lusak	Won
1990	FAMAS Awards	Best Director	Macho Dancer	Nominated
1986	FAMAS Awards	Best Director	Bayan Ko: Kapit Sa Patalim	Nominated
1986	FAMAS Awards	Best Director	Miguelito: Batang Rebelde	Nominated
1983	FAMAS Awards	Best Director	Cain at Abel	Nominated
1980	FAMAS Awards	Best Director	Jaguar	Won
1979	FAMAS Awards	Best Director	Gumising Ka... Maruja	Nominated
1978	FAMAS Awards	Best Director	Tahan na Empoy, Tahan	Nominated
1977	FAMAS Awards	Best Director	Insiang	Nominated
1976	FAMAS Awards	Best Director	Maynila: Sa Mga Kuko Ng Liwanag	Won
1975	FAMAS Awards	Best Director	Tinimbang Ka Ngunit Kulang	Won
1973	FAMAS Awards	Best Director	Villa Miranda	Nominated
1972	FAMAS Awards	Best Director	Stardoom	Nominated
1971	FAMAS Awards	Best Director	Tubog Sa Ginto	Won
1991	FAP Awards, Philippines	Best Director	Gumapang Ka Sa Lusak	Won
1986	FAP Awards, Philippines	Best Director	Bayan Ko: Kapit Sa Patalim	Won
1992	Gawad Urian Awards	Best Direction (Pinakamahusay na Direksyon)	Sa Kabila Ng Lahat	Nominated
1991	Gawad Urian Awards	Best Direction (Pinakamahusay na Direksyon)	Gumapang Ka Sa Lusak	Nominated
1990	Gawad Urian Awards	Best Direction (Pinakamahusay na Direksyon)	Macho Dancer	Nominated
1986	Gawad Urian Awards	Best Direction (Pinakamahusay na Direksyon)	Bayan Ko: Kapit Sa Patalim	Nominated
1986	Gawad Urian Awards	Best Direction (Pinakamahusay na Direksyon)	Miguelito: Batang Rebelde	Nominated
1984	Gawad Urian Awards	Best Direction (Pinakamahusay na Direksyon)	Hot Property	Nominated
1983	Gawad Urian Awards	Best Direction (Pinakamahusay na Direksyon)	Cain at Abel	Nominated
1981	Gawad Urian Awards	Best Film of the Decade (Natatanging Pelikula ng Dekada)	Insiang	Won
1981	Gawad Urian Awards	Best Film of the Decade (Natatanging Pelikula ng Dekada)	Jaguar	Won
1981	Gawad Urian Awards	Best Film of the Decade (Natatanging Pelikula ng Dekada)	Maynila sa Mga Kuko ng Liwanag	Won
1981	Gawad Urian Awards	Best Film of the Decade (Natatanging Pelikula ng Dekada)	Tinimbang Ka Ngunit Kulang	Won
1981	Gawad Urian Awards	Best Direction (Pinakamahusay na Direksyon)	Bona	Nominated
1980	Gawad Urian Awards	Best Direction (Pinakamahusay na Direksyon)	Jaguar	Won
1979	Gawad Urian Awards	Best Direction (Pinakamahusay na Direksyon)	Mananayaw	Nominated
1978	Gawad Urian Awards	Best Direction (Pinakamahusay na Direksyon)	Tahan na Empoy, tahan	Nominated
1977	Gawad Urian Awards	Best Direction (Pinakamahusay na Direksyon)	Insiang	Nominated
1985	Metro Manila Film Festival	Best Director	Ano ang kulay ng mukha ng Diyos?	Won
1979	Metro Manila Film Festival	Best Director	Ina Ka ng Anak Mo	Won
1983	Nantes Three Continents Festival	Golden Montgolfiere	Angela Markado	Won
1992	Young Critics Circle, Philippines	Best Film	Sa Kabila ng Lahat	Won
1991	Young Critics Circle, Philippines	Silver Prize	Hahamakin Lahat	Won
