= Spirit away =

English expression for a concept in Japanese folklore

In English, to "spirit away" means to remove without anyone's noticing.

In Japanese folklore, spiriting away (神隠し, kamikakushi; lit. 'hidden by kami') refers to the mysterious disappearance or death of a person, after they had angered the spirits (kami). There are numerous legends of humans being abducted to the spirit world by kami. Folklorist Kunio Yanagita recorded several tales of kamikakushi in Tōno Monogatari (遠野物語; Tōno Tales, 1909).

In Philippine folklore, spiriting away means disappearance of a person towards the land of the Engkantos (enchanted beings). One example is Biringan, a magical city rumored to be found in Samar.

== Bible ==
Elijah disappears when a chariot of fire appears and is taken up to heaven in a whirlwind.

Philip the Evangelist is taken away by the Spirit of the Lord after witnessing the Ethiopian eunuch (Acts 8).

== Modern fiction ==
=== In Japan ===
In the anime film Spirited Away, the main protagonist, Chihiro, is "spirited away" from reality to the spirit world after her parents angered the witch Yubaba by greedily eating their food. There, she meets friendly and aggressive spirits as she tries to return before forgetting her name.

In the series Higurashi When They Cry one person dies and one disappears mysteriously every year in Hinamizawa village. This is known as "Oyashiro-sama's curse," named after the village kami Oyashiro. The first arc of the series "Onikakushi-hen" translates to "Abducted by Demons" or "Demoning away".

In the novel and manga Missing / Spirited Away by Gakuto Coda, the main character Utsume Kyoichi goes missing for a second time, in the company of his new spirit girlfriend Ayame.

In the manga Rin-ne by Rumiko Takahashi, heroine Sakura Mamiya disappeared for a week after being taken away by spirits, and she was brought back to this world by Rinne's grandmother Tamako. Sakura can't remember what exactly happened to her during these days, but as a consequence she gained spiritual powers that let her see ghosts, something that she wants to get rid of.

Kamikakushi is mentioned in a song "Madoite Kitare, Yuuda na Kamikakushi ~ Border of Death" by IOSYS. It refers to Yukari's mystic abilities.

In the video game series Fatal Frame many of the characters get spirited away by ghosts often leading them into a spirit world where they use the Camera Obscura, an antique camera-like device that captures images of spirits to either find a way out or save someone who has been spirited away.

In the Japanese classic film Goyokin by Hideo Gosha (starring Tatsuya Nakadai), kamikakushi is mentioned after the inhabitants of a small fishing village all mysteriously vanish.

=== Other literature ===
In the 1820 short story The Legend of Sleepy Hollow, when the main character Ichabod Crane vanishes after being pursued by the Headless Horseman, he is rumored to have been spirited away by the specter.

== See also ==
- Alien abduction
- Changeling
- Ijiraq
- Glossary of Shinto#K
- The Guardian (1990 film)
- Metsänpeitto
- Mo-sin-a
- Ōkami Kakushi
- Rapture
- Tengu
- Unexplained disappearances
- Yama-bito
