= Engkanto =

Philippine mythological figures

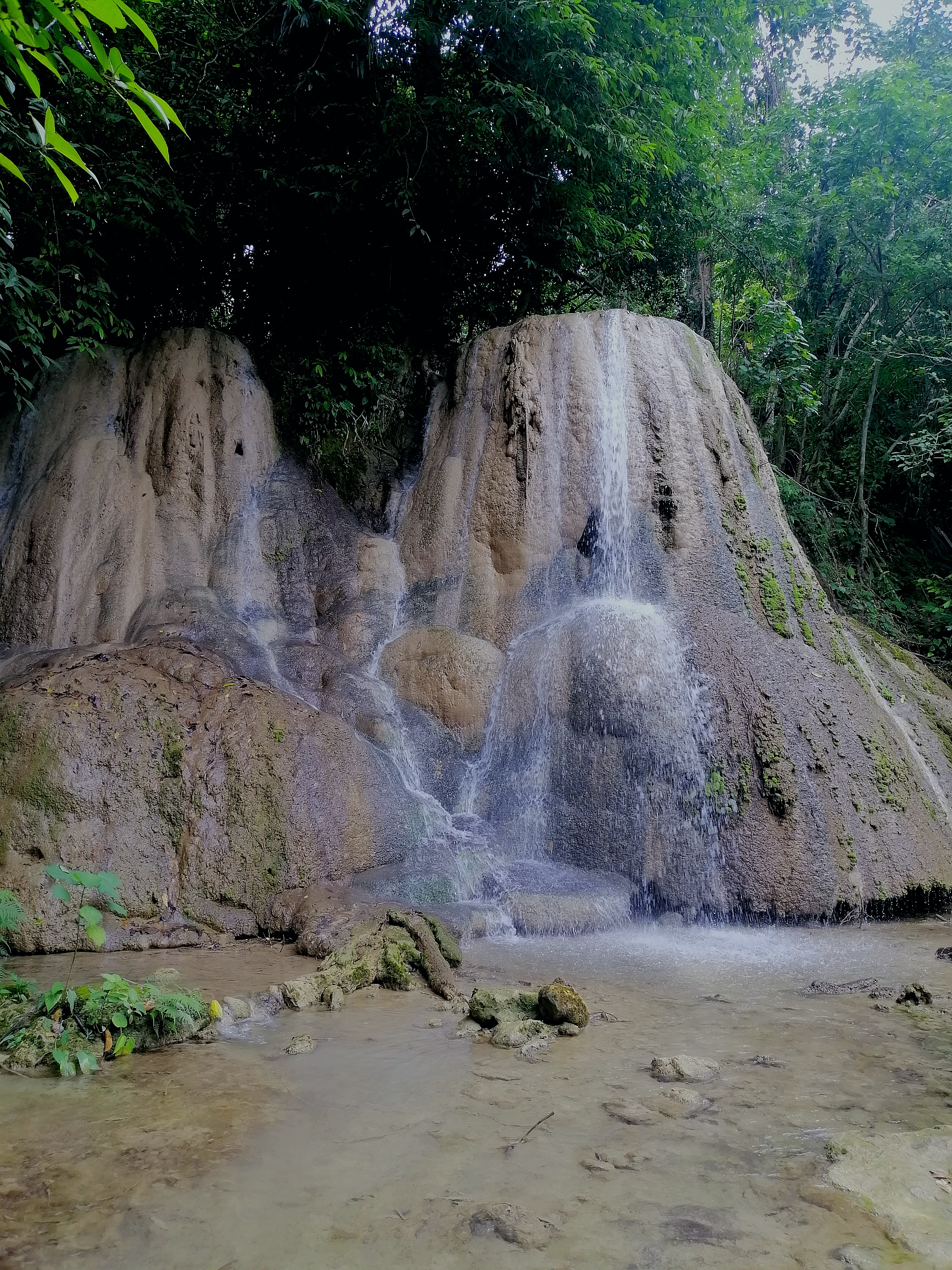
- Gender: Male/female
- Region: Philippines

Engkanto (from Spanish encanto, lit. 'enchantment') are mythical environmental spirits that are said to have the ability to appear in human form. They are often associated with the spirits of ancestors and spirits of the dead called anito in the Philippines. They are also characterized as spirit sorts like sirens, dark beings, elves, and more. Belief in their existence has likely existed for centuries, and continues to this day.

It is a bracket term for enchanted human-like beings of the land which includes a variety of mythical races. The term itself was adopted from the Spanish, who were dumbfounded by the wide array of mythical races in the Philippines and just referred to many of the races as "enchanted". Though at the same time the term does not differ at all from the archaic Spanish sense of the word as referring to a supernatural apparition, sometimes tied to a place.

Francisco Demetrio made a study of 87 folk stories from Visayas and Mindanao relating to engkanto. He contended that the engkanto were based on early European friars.

== Appearance ==
Engkanto have many similarities to humans in that they age, appear to have male and female sexes, can experience from illness and even die. They are an object of mythology for many Filipinos, often told by adults as stories and shown on media. Some appear to be beautiful having blue eyes, fair complexion and golden hair, but may also have unusual features such as high-bridged noses and absent philtrums. They have a wide range of appearances but give off a different feeling or vibe from humans. Other variants exhibit sexual dimorphism such as Bagobo spirits which are separated into the female tahamaling and the male mahomanay. The female spirit is alleged to have a red complexion while males have a fair complexion. Their dwellings will normally appear as natural features such as large rocks, trees, or shadows in human form, although they can appear as magnificent palaces to humans they have befriended. These creatures prefer large trees and natural features such as the balete, in which they also place their belongings. An engkanto may choose to stay by a human's side as told by stories where characters are usually in either a sense of trance or a deep loss of energy. Engkanto may be good or bad.

== Capabilities ==
Engkanto are most commonly known for either extreme malignant effects, or an overwhelming influence of luck. Those who the engkanto do not favor would become depressed, suffer from madness, or even disappear for days or months, possibly as a result of possession. They are also said to be capable of causing fevers and skin diseases such as boils. These spirits also sometimes lead travelers astray in the forest, even kidnap them. This, however, is said to be avoidable by bringing an "anting-anting" or "agimat" a piece of magical charm or amulet that wards away evil spirits and prevents them from harming the wielder. However, if they do favor someone, they are generous and capable of bringing power, luck and riches to that person.They are also capable of healing diseases. Shamans often try to commune with engkanto on holy days to obtain better healing powers from them, as well as to learn how to better deal with evil spirits.

== Equivalents in non-Filipino traditions ==
=== Elves ===
The engkanto of Philippine mythology are highly similar to elves of European folklore. Elves are magical, human-like beings from Germanic folklore and are especially common in Norse mythology. In early stories, they were seen as beautiful and powerful—sometimes helpful, sometimes harmful. The word elf likely meant “white being,” and beliefs about them varied across time and cultures. In medieval times, elves were linked to gods, magic, illness, and seduction. Later, the word fell out of use in some areas, replaced by terms like "dwarf" or "fairy," but belief in elves lasted longer in places like Scotland and Scandinavia. In Central Europe and Scandinavia, as society modernized, belief in elves faded. However, they became popular in literature and art, evolving into small, playful creatures, especially in Shakespeare's plays. Romantic-era writers revived the idea, which led to the elves in modern fantasy stories and Christmas tales. Thanks to J.R.R. Tolkien, modern fantasy often portrays elves as tall, graceful, and magical beings.

=== Jinn ===
Jinn are supernatural beings in Arabian and Islamic mythology, made from smokeless fire. Jinn can be good or bad, invisible to humans, and are believed to have free will, like people. They can influence human thoughts, actions, or even possess people. Highly similar to engkanto, they are mysterious spirit-beings known for their beauty, magical abilities, and their power to enchant, possess, or bring illness to humans. The jinn, elves, and engkanto share common traits: they exist in a realm beyond human perception, interact with the human world in unpredictable ways, and are both feared and revered.

=== Orang bunian ===
Orang bunian are supernatural beings from Malaysian, Bruneian, and Indonesian folklore, often compared to elves. Their name means "hidden people" or "whistling people," and they are usually invisible to humans, except to those with spiritual sensitivity. They look almost exactly like humans, often dressed in traditional ancient Southeast Asian clothing. Like the engkanto in Philippine mythology, orang bunian live in a hidden realm parallel to ours and can interact with people in mysterious ways. Both are believed to be beautiful, powerful beings who can either help or harm, much like the elves of European folklore or the jinn of Arabian tradition.

=== Patupaiarehe ===
In Māori culture, Patupaiarehe are beings similar to Philippine engkanto and European elves and fairies. Patupaiarehe are supernatural beings in Māori mythology, often described as pale-skinned with red or blonde hair. They look human but live in misty forests or mountains, away from people. Sunlight harms them, so they are active mostly at night or on foggy days. They dislike fire and cooked food, and their music is said to be more beautiful than human music. Like the pale-skinned engkanto of Philippine mythology, patupaiarehe are spirit-like beings who live in hidden places, can be seen by only a few, and may react negatively if disturbed.

== In popular culture ==
Engkanto have been portrayed in Philippine pop culture and media, particularly in films and television shows:

- The Shake, Rattle & Roll film series: V (1994), 9 (2007), X (2008), 12 (2010), and 13 (2011)
- Spirit Warriors: The Shortcut (2003)
- Luna Mystika (2008–2009)
- T2 (2009)
- Ang Panday (2017)

== See also ==
- Philippine mythology
- Elves
- Orang bunian
- Mrenh kongveal
- Brownie (folklore)
- Biringan
- Enchanted moura
