= Biringan =

Mythical city in the Philippines

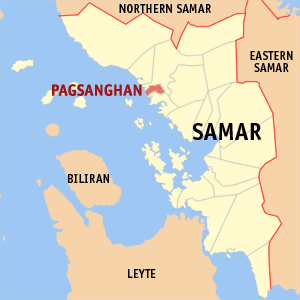
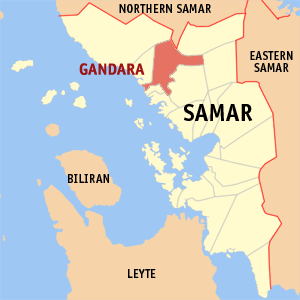
The location maps of the municipalities of Pangsanghan and Gandara, two suspected places where Biringan is located.

Biringan (Tagalog pronunciation: [ˈbɪɾɪŋɐn]) is a mythical city said to lie invisibly between the municipalities of Gandara and Pagsanghan in the province of Samar, Philippines. Described as ultramodern, engkantos ("enchanted beings") populate the city. Seven portals are said to be scattered across Samar. A few of people have claimed to have seen the city, with folk stories stating that the witnesses have been the victims of demon possessions. There was a legend that a satellite image showed large gold deposits in the alleged area near Biringan, leading the Japanese to create mining efforts in the area which led to accidents. Biringan is well-known over Samar with numerous movies based around the mythical city.

== Legend ==
The ultramodern city is said to be located in the province of Samar specifically near Gandara and Pagsanghan. According to the local folklore, the population of Biringan comprises supernatural beings: the engkanto ("enchanted beings"), and their progeny with humans. The engkanto are described as shapeshifters who can adopt human form. In human form, they are identified by the absence of a philtrum. The name itself, Biringan, originates from "Hanapán ng mga nawáwalâ" (transl. The place where the lost are found) in the local Waray language. The city is also alleged to contain gold. According to folklore, there are seven portals leading to the city that are scattered across Samar, one of which is said to be located at an old tree on the grounds of Northwest Samar State University in Calbayog. the city. Some seafarers have claimed to have seen a "dazzling city of light" on moonless nights, lasting a few minutes. According to folk stories, most of the people who claim to have seen the city have been the victims of demonic possession.

== History and cultural impact ==
Folklore about the city began circulating in the 1960s, when there was a legend surrounding an American shipment for expensive construction materials which was allegedly addressed to Biringan, confusing the staff. There was a legend that a Japanese company believed that there were rich deposits of gold and uranium in the area through satellite images. They began work immediately, setting up a large work site in the town of San Jorge, but accidents plagued the project from the start, forcing the company to shut down operations and abandon the project to avoid bankruptcy and cut their losses. The city was featured on the Mel & Joey talk show with a story from an alleged witness. When the internet became popular, the myth spread there as people who claimed to be from Biringan commented in posts related to the mythical city.

The 2009 Filipino supernatural horror film T2, directed by Samar native Chito S. Roño, is loosely based on the legend of Biringan. The 2018 Filipino film Gusto Kita With All My Hypothalamus by Dwein Baltazar discusses a person attempting to walk to Biringan in search of his mother. Swipe Right To Disappear, a film discussing Biringan from Cebu was featured in the 2019 Metro Manila Film Festival. An upcoming film about Biringan was also announced by Mentorque Productions in 2024.

The 2026 DreamWorks Animation feature film, Forgotten Island, has the principal setting of Nakali, which bears a striking resemblance to Biringan. Its name is a clipping of the Filipino word nakalimutan ("forgotten").

== See also ==
- Agartha
- Brownie (folklore)
- Elves
- Engkanto
- Mrenh kongveal
- Orang bunian
- Philippine mythology
