= Metsänpeitto =

Phenomenon in Finnish folklore

Metsänpeitto (Finnish pronunciation: [ˈmetsæmˌpei̯tːo], lit. forest's cover) is a term in Finnish folklore which refers to the belief that the forest could hide or imprison people or domestic animals such as cows or horses so that they could not escape and would be invisible to people who went in search of them. Another term for the same phenomenon is metsänkätkö — literally "the forest's secret place for hiding things." Swedes in Finland called this skogen håller ("the forest keeps").

People "covered by forest" were described as not being able to recognize the terrain around them, even if they were on familiar grounds. In other cases they might have walked endlessly through unfamiliar terrain, or were rendered completely paralyzed, unable to move or speak. Unnatural silence devoid of the sounds of nature was also common.

People or animals under the influence of the phenomenon were described as becoming either completely invisible to other people, or looking like part of the nature around them, like a rock. In one story a man had been looking for a missing cow for days. When he finally gave up and returned to his work, the first tree stump he struck with his axe transformed back into his cow.

The cause of metsänpeitto was sometimes credited to maahiset (singular: maahinen) who were supernatural small human-like beings imagined to live underground — literally earthlings or earth-dwellers (often translated as "gnomes"). A lost person could sometimes free oneself by reversing one's garments — turning their jacket inside out, by switching their shoes to the wrong feet, or by watching world upside down through their own legs. This was because of the idea that everything was topsy-turvy in the lands of the maahiset. Some were released seemingly without reason, others only after being sought after by a shaman. Some were never seen again.

Metsänpeitto greatly resembles "kamikakushi", or "spiriting away", found in Japanese folklore.
