= Philippine mythology =

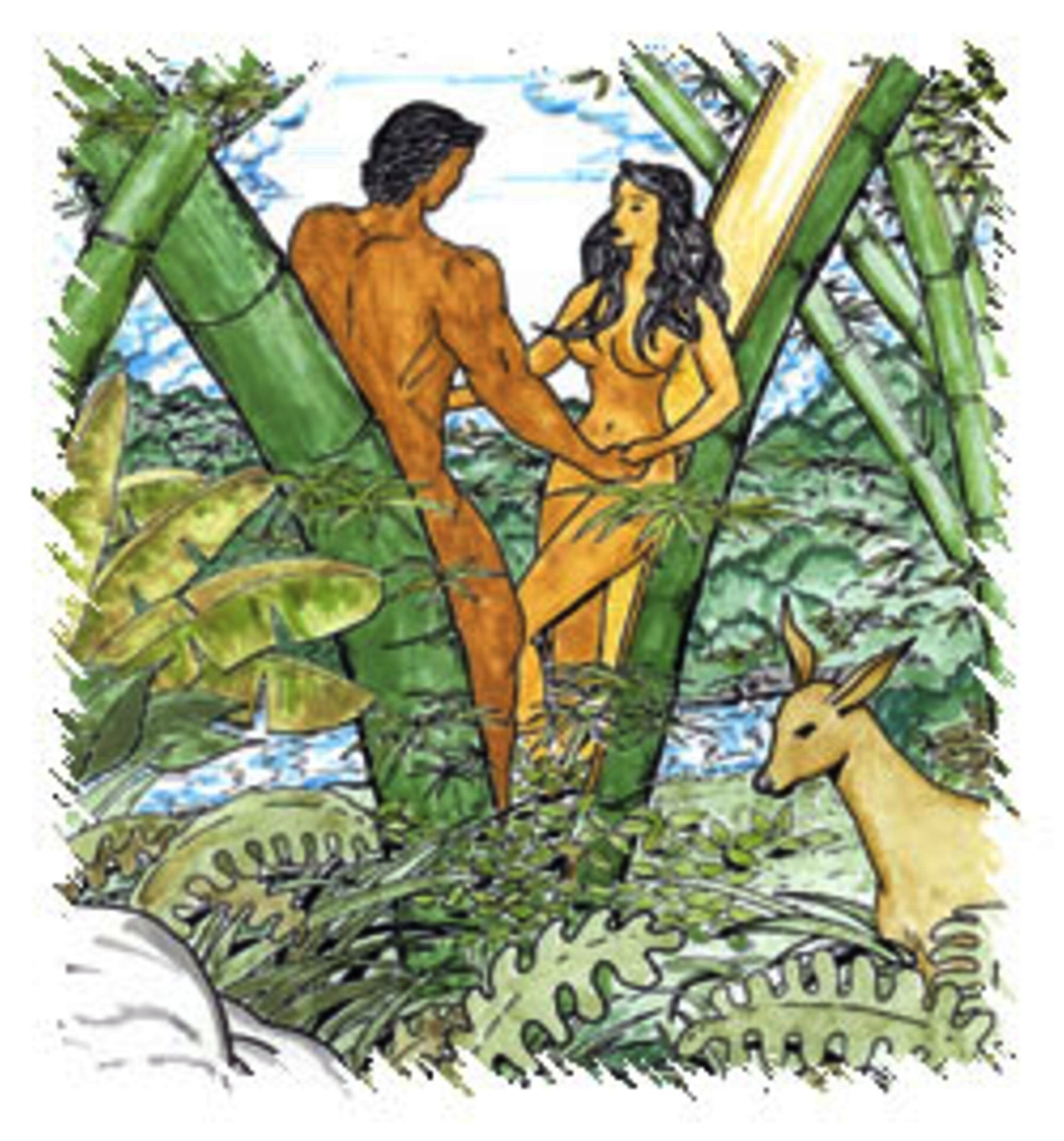
Portrait of the first man, Malakas, and woman, Maganda, who came out from a bamboo pecked by the bird form of the deity of peace, Amihan, in Tagalog mythology

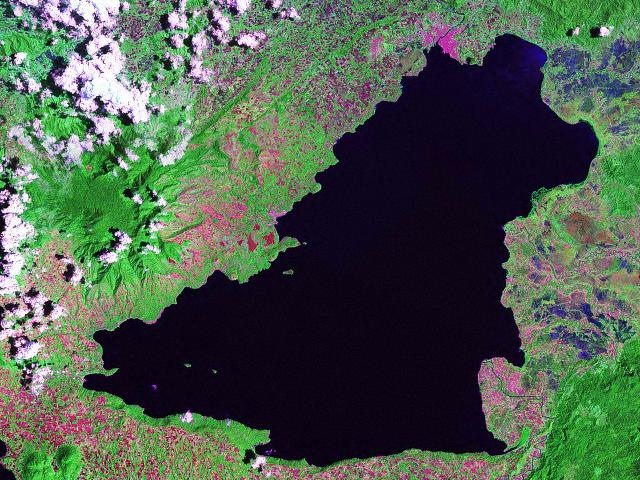
The Maranao people believe that Lake Lanao is a gap that resulted in the transfer of Mantapoli into the center of the world.

Philippine mythology is rooted in the many indigenous Philippine folk religions. Philippine mythology exhibits influence from Hindu, Muslim, Buddhist, and Christian traditions.

Philippine mythology includes concepts akin to those in other belief systems, such as the notions of heaven (kaluwalhatian, kalangitan, kamurawayan), hell (kasamaan, sulad), and the human soul (kaluluwa, kaulolan, makatu, ginoand kud,...).

The primary use of Philippine mythology is to explain the nature of the world, human existence, and life's mysteries. Myths include narratives of heroes, deities (anito, Diwata), and mythological creatures. These myths were transmitted through oral tradition, handed down through generations guided by spiritual leaders or shamans, (babaylan, katalonan, mumbaki, baglan, machanitu, walian, mangubat, bahasa,...), and community elders.

== Sources ==
The two significant sources of Philippine mythologies are oral and written literature.

=== Oral literature ===
Oral literature (also known as folk literature) consists of stories that passed down the generations by speech or song. All Philippine mythologies originated as oral literature. Stories naturally change and proliferate. Despite many recording projects, the majority have yet to be properly documented. These traditions were intentionally influenced with by the Spanish through the 16th century influence of Christian mythology. Examples include the Biag ni Lam-ang and the Tale of Bernardo Carpio, where certain characters were imposed with Spanish names and influence. Interest in oral literature grew in the 21st century due to interest among the youth, alongside with literary works, television, radio, and social media.

=== Written literature ===
Spanish chroniclers have claimed that the indigenous population of the Philippines did not have written religious literature. However, scholars agree that statements of denial likely reflected a desire by the colonizers to deny the existence of what they did not approve. For example, the Spanish chronicler Chirino stated that the natives had no religious writings, but on the same account narrated that a native possessed an indigenous poetic book. The book was utilized by the natives to express a "deliberate pact" with what the Spanish called with prejudice as "the devil", which contextually was an indigenous god and not a demon. The book was burned on order of the Spanish. The scholar Beyer also noted of the time when a Spanish priest boasted about burning indigenous religious writings, specifically "more than three hundred scrolls written in the native character". Even Chinese sources maintain the existence of indigenous religious texts from the Philippines. In 1349, the Chinese Wang Ta-yuan recorded that widows of important leaders spent the rest of their lives poring over religious texts. Spanish sources note that native writings were written on native reeds and leaves using iron points and other local pens, similar to how things are written on a papyrus, and formed into scrolls or books. Some were also written on bamboos.

Juan de Plasencia wrote the Relacion de las Costumbres de Los Tagalos in 1589, documenting the traditions of the Tagalog people. Miguel de Loarca wrote Relacion de las Yslas Filipinas and Pedro Chirino added Relacion de las Yslas Filipinas (1604). Anitism books have been published by universities throughout the country, such as Mindanao State University, University of San Carlos, University of the Philippines, Ateneo Universities, Silliman University, and University of the Cordilleras, as well as other publishers such as Anvil Publishing. The publications spanned the 16th to the 21st centuries. Printed but unpublished sources include college and graduate school theses. Written literature does not provide definitive accounts of particular stories, which vary from town to town, even within the same ethnic group. Examples include Bakunawa and the Seven Moons and The Tambanokano, whose specifics depend on the locality, ethnicity, story origin, and cultural progression.

== History ==
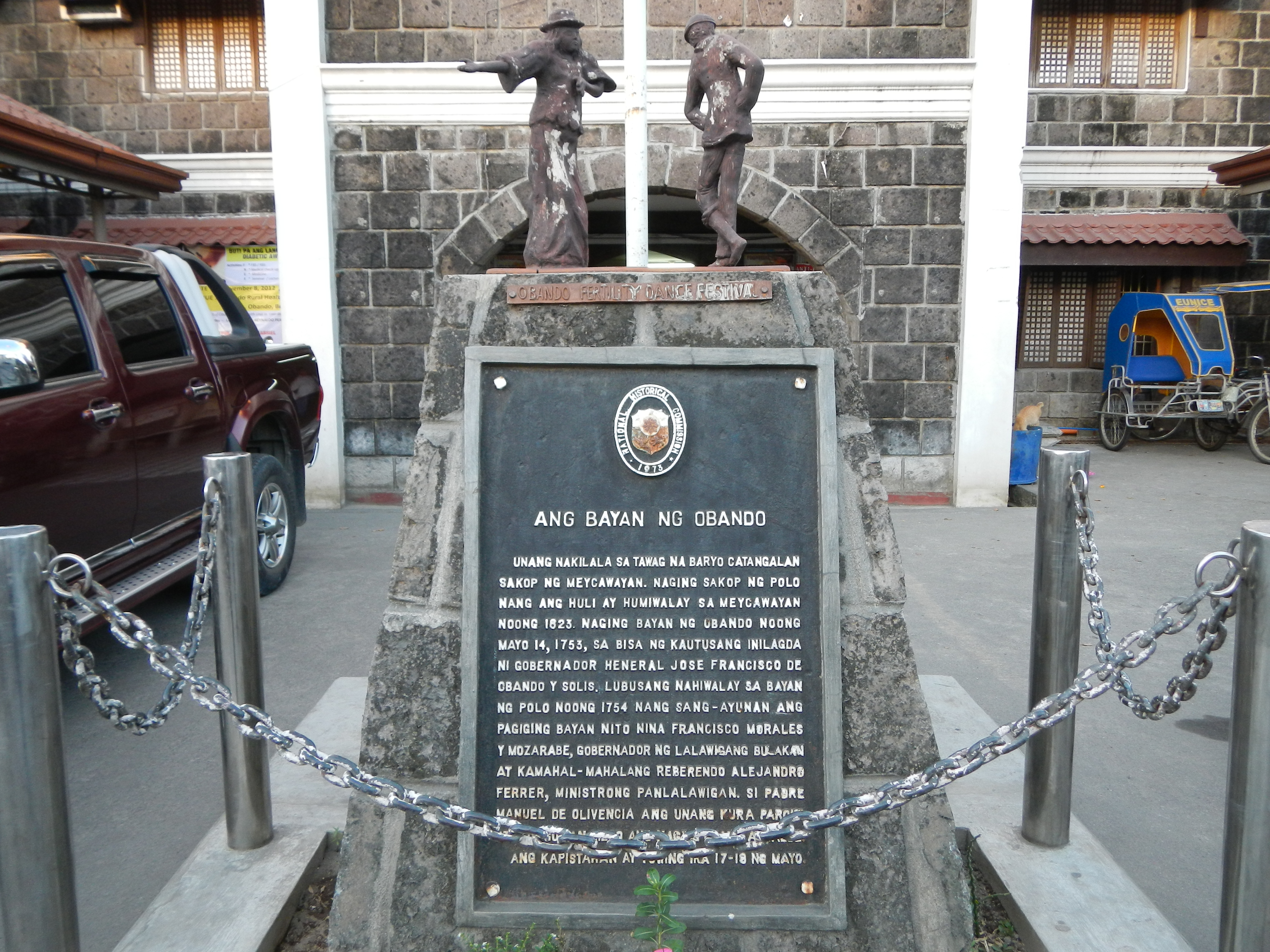
The Tagalog people's Obando Fertility Rites, before becoming a Catholic festival, was initially an animist ritual dedicated to the intersex deity, Lakapati, who presided over fertility, the goddess of love, Diyan Masalanta, and the supreme god, Bathala.

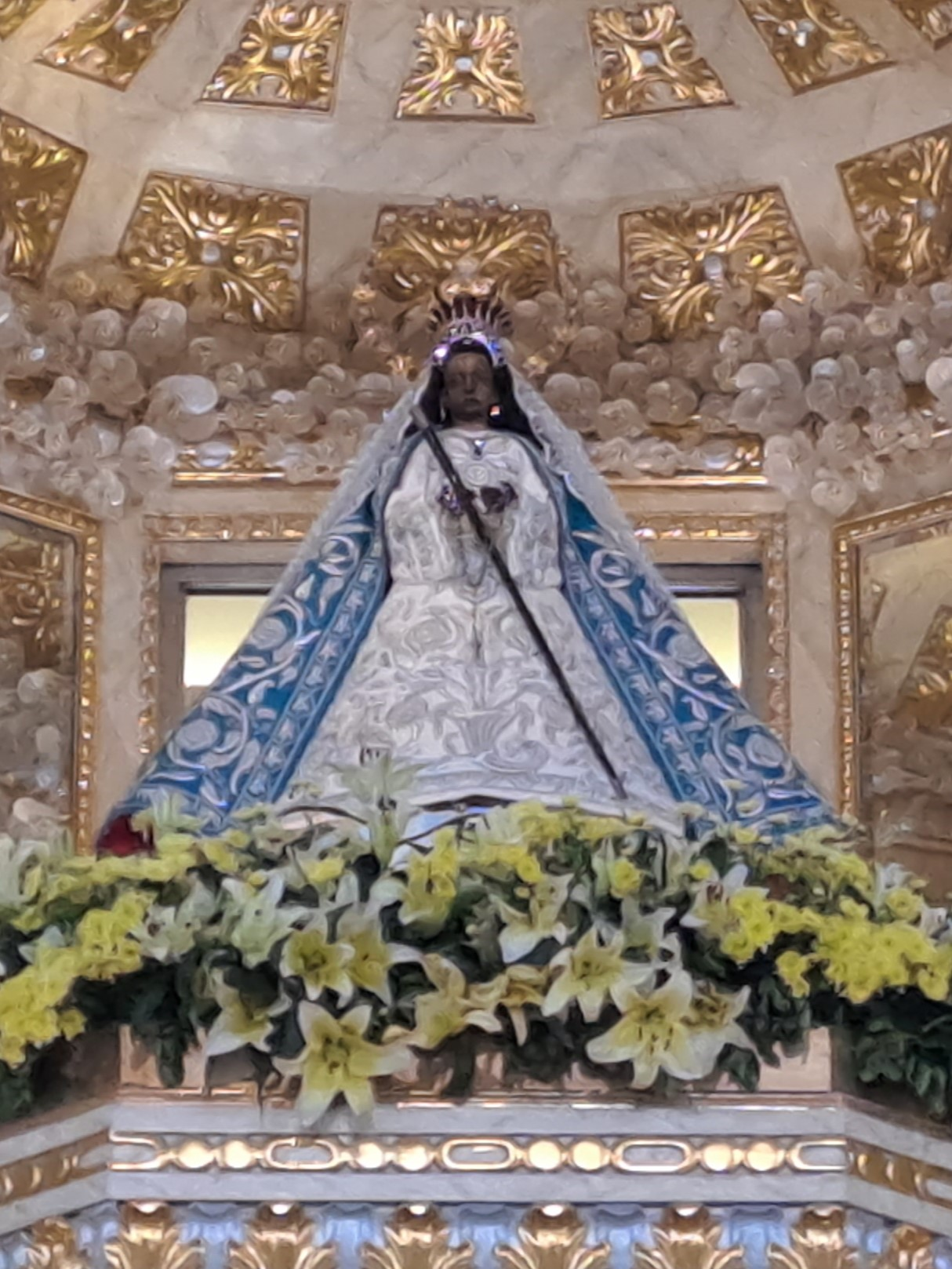
The Virgin of Antipolo has animist connections. Many of the rituals and prayers connected to the Lady of the Breadfruit (Tipolo) Tree have similarities to the pre-colonial indigenous cult of Maguayen, the Visayan god to whom people made offerings before building a boat or embarking on a voyage. Similarly, the Virgin of Antipolo is also asked for protection and well-being, as well as for the blessing of new cars, the modern mode of transportation.

The indigenous religions of the Philippines developed through a variety of migrations and trade routes. Scholars theorized that Austronesians arrived through the "Out-of-Taiwan model", crossing from mainland Asia to Taiwan, and later the Philippines, continuing to other islands. The Austronesians are believed to have brought animist beliefs incorporating shamanism, ancestor worship, totemism, and tattoos. Beliefs in benevolent and malevolent spirits was established by their arrival.

By 200 to 300 CE, Hindu mythologies arrived in the Philippines through trade routes and migration. Hinduism brought Indianized traditions to the Philippines, including indigenous epics such as Ibalong, Siday, and Hinilawod, folk stories, and superstitions that blended with indigenous polytheisims. The concept of good and bad demons, prevalent in Indian societies, became widespread in the archipelago. These demons were regarded as both evil and good. Indigenous religions were not replaced by Hinduism, rather, the former absorbed traditions and beliefs from it. Gender-variant deities and shamans became widespread. Humanoid mythical creatures emerged alongside a variety of belief systems. Around 900 CE, Chinese influence spread in some areas, adding Sinified and Buddhist belief systems. The most prominent was belief in ghosts.

By 1300 CE, Muslim traders arrived in the southern Philippines, bringing with them Islamic myth and belief systems. Many in the southern and western Philippines converted to Islam. In the middle of the 16th century, the Spanish arrived from Latin America and brought with them Ibero-American Christian myth (for example, veneration to Our Lady of Guadalupe). Some inhabitants were receptive to these myths, but most were not as the Spanish wanted to conquer the islands, instead of just injecting traditions. The Spanish began a three-century purge against indigenous religions, suppressing and mocking indigenous cultures. Monotheism generally replaced indigenous polytheistic beliefs. Traditional myths and folklore were gradually reshaped and adapted to fit the changing beliefs and influences of the time. However, indigenous belief systems survived–despite Spanish threats and killings. The Philippine revolution was accompanied by attempts to revitalize the indigenous Philippine folk religions and establish them as the state religion. However, the proposals were sidelined over conflicts with the Americans, which led to war. In the late 19th century, the US occupied the country leading more people to convert to Christianity.

== Regional mythology ==
Filipino mythologies from different ethnic groups have similarities such as:

- The Bicolano people and the Visayan myths use different names for their deities, but the activities in their creation myths are similar;
- Deities named Mayari/Malayari/Apûng Malyari, are prevalent in Tagalog, Kapampangan, and Sambal mythologies;
- The moon deity Bulan and serpent deity Bakunawa appear in Hiligaynon, Karay-a, Cebuano and Bicolano mythologies;
- Moon-swallowing monsters named Tambanokano in Mandaya and Manobo mythologies. The Mandaya Tambanokano is portrayed as a crab, while the Manobo Tambanokano is depicted as a tarantula or scorpion;
- Foe-deities named Gugurang and Asuang appear in Bicolano mythology and in Hiligaynon mythology named Agurang and Aswang; and
- A deity named Kabunian appears in the mythologies of the Ibaloi people, the Bontoc people, and the Ifugao people.

The deities, heroes, and creatures are different from each other, and do not form a unified narrative. Each story has multiple versions. In many cases, stories vary from place to place even within a single ethnic group.

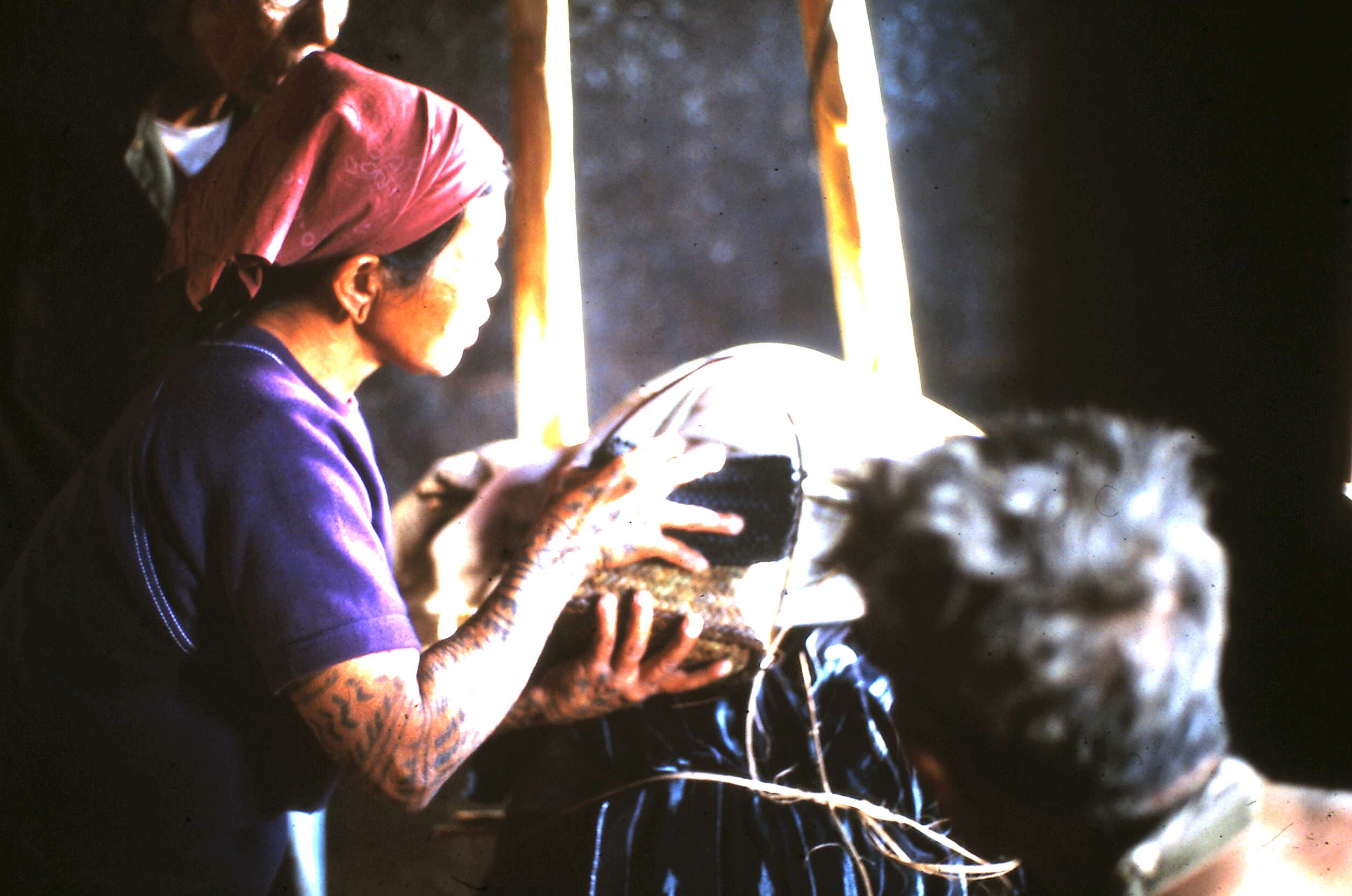
A Bontoc shaman performing a sacred wake ritual with a death chair.

The 7,000 Philippines islands divide into three main regions: Luzon, Visayas, and Mindanao (which is subdivided into North and South). The difference in mythologies and belief systems is by ethnic group instead than geography. Some ethnic groups have influence in only a few towns, while others span provinces. Buddhism and Hinduism in the Philippines is influential.

=== Luzon ===
Pre-colonial Luzon was split among Hindu-Buddhist, Muslim, and animist worshippers.

- Creation Story – Story of Bathala (Tagalog) the story explains how Bathala became the ruler of the universe, the etiological explanation of the coconut tree, and how everything on Earth came to be
- The Creation – Lumawig (Igorot) Lumawig is a spirit god who created people in different areas and explains why people speak different languages.
- The Flood Story – Lumawig (Igorot) Lumawig's two sons flood the Earth to bring up mountains so that they can catch pig and deer. However, this drowned all the people on Earth except for a brother and sister. Lumawig helped the two survive and after it subsided, the brother and sister married and repopulated the Earth. (Etiological explanation for mountains)

=== Visayas ===
Pre-colonial Visayas were influenced by Hindu-Buddhist and Animism. The Spaniards described some of the people who lived there as pintados,

- The Sun And the Moon– the Sun and Moon created the stars. The Sun burned the stars and this upset the Moon. They begin to fight, but the Moon ran away, chased by the Sun

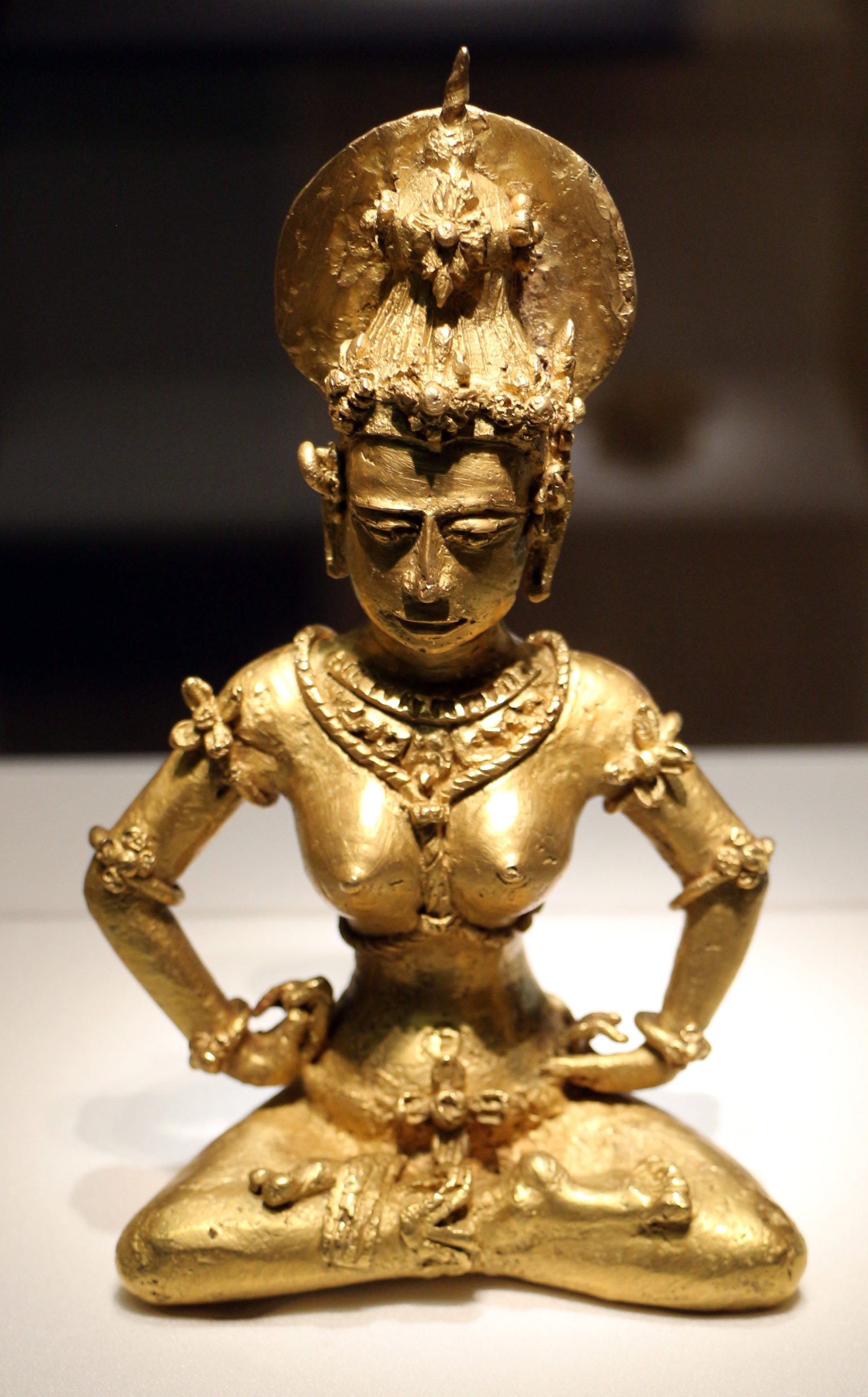
The Agusan image statue (900–950 CE) discovered in 1917 on the banks of the Wawa River near Esperanza, Agusan del Sur, Mindanao in the Philippines.

=== Mindanao ===
Pre-colonial Mindanao (around 900AD) was influenced by Hindu-Buddhist, Indonesian, and Malaysian beliefs and culture. By the 14th century, Islam was well established in most northern islands of Mindanao.

- The Children of the Limokon (Mandaya) – The limokon bird laid eggs along a river that created man and woman. However, they were born on opposite sides of the river. One day the man saw the woman and they married and had children.
- The Sun and the Moon (Mandaya) – The Sun and Moon were married, but one day, the Sun got angry at the Moon and started to chase her. The Sun became angry at his first child, minced him and scattered him across the sky to form the stars. Another son was a gigantic crab who created lightning when he blinked. He lives in a hole in the bottom of the ocean and is responsible for the tides.
- How the Moon and the Stars Came to Be (Bukidnon) – At one time the sky was close to the ground. A spinster who was pounding rice struck the sky so hard it began to rise. Her comb and beads that she hung on the sky to dry rose with it and became the Moon and stars.
- The Flood Story (Bukidnon) – A big crab that crawled into the sea created the flood that drowned everyone except those who made a raft and survived upon it.
- Origin (Bagobo) – A boy and a girl were the only ones left on Mount Apo. They were weak because of a drought. However, the boy found a sugarcane that fed them until rain came. This is why they are called Bagobo.
- Epic ‘Tudbulul’ (T’Boli) – Tudbulu was a hero who organized a concert. He gathered music, attracting many people. Some of these people stayed and formed the T’boli people.
- Creation Story – D’wata (T’boli) – The Betoti found soil and brought it to D’wata. They spread out the soil and created land. The animals told Betoti that they needed someone to look after them. Betoti told D’wata. Man and woman were created out of statues.
- Creation Story – Melu (B’laan) – Melu created the Earth with his dead skin that came off as he cleaned himself. The remaining dead skin was used to make two men. However, Melu could not make their noses. Tau Tana appeared below the earth and helped him make noses. When they were done, they whipped the men until they started to move. Melu then told the men to save their dead skin and hair from which he made them companions.
- In the Beginning (B’laan) – Four beings created the Earth and people. They tried using wax, then dirt. However, their noses were difficult to make. Melu was in a hurry and pressed his finger at the root of their noses. This is how the B’laan peoples’ noses were formed.

== Cosmogony or creation myths ==
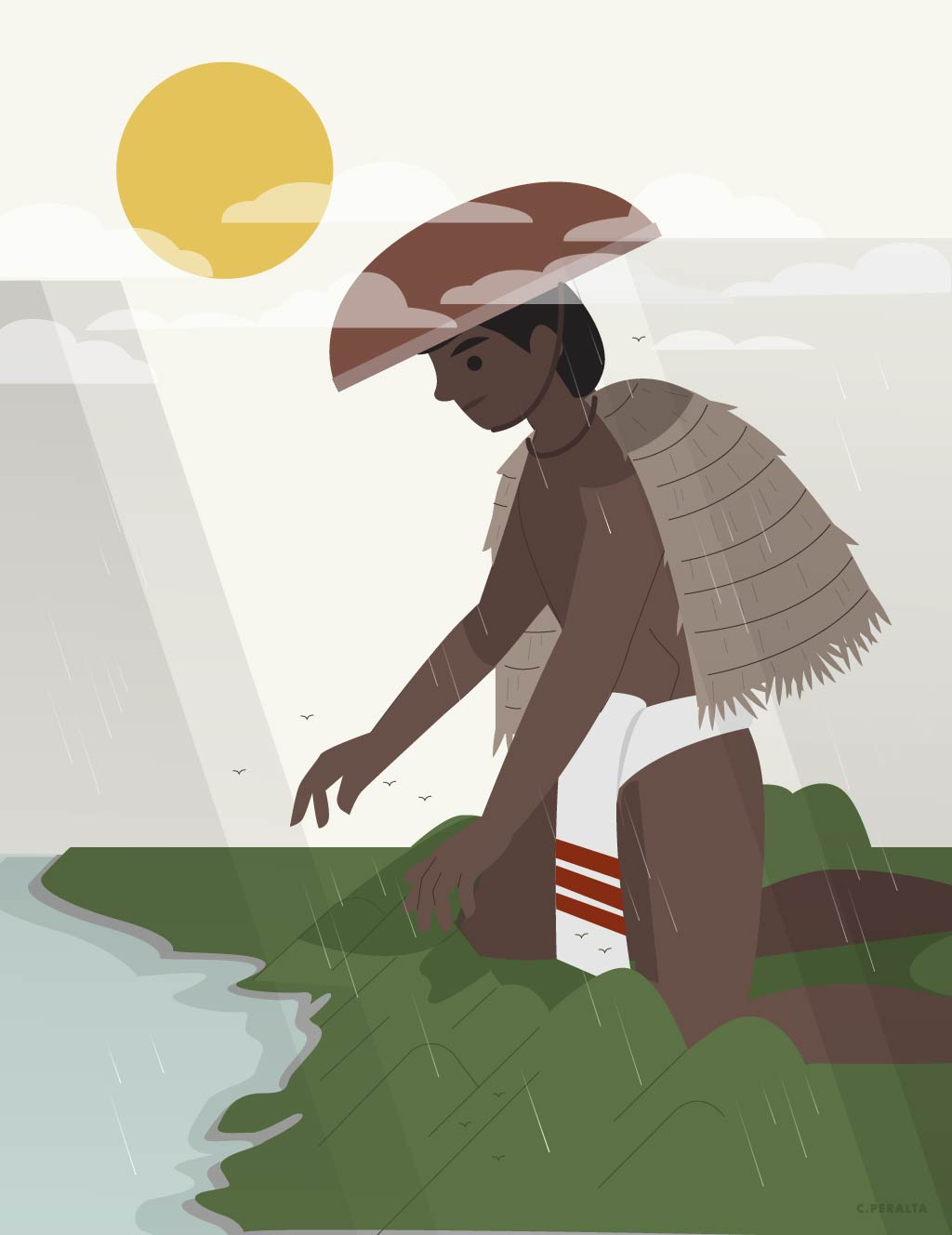
Angalo, a creation giant, is said to be the first man and the son of the god of building in Ilokano mythology.

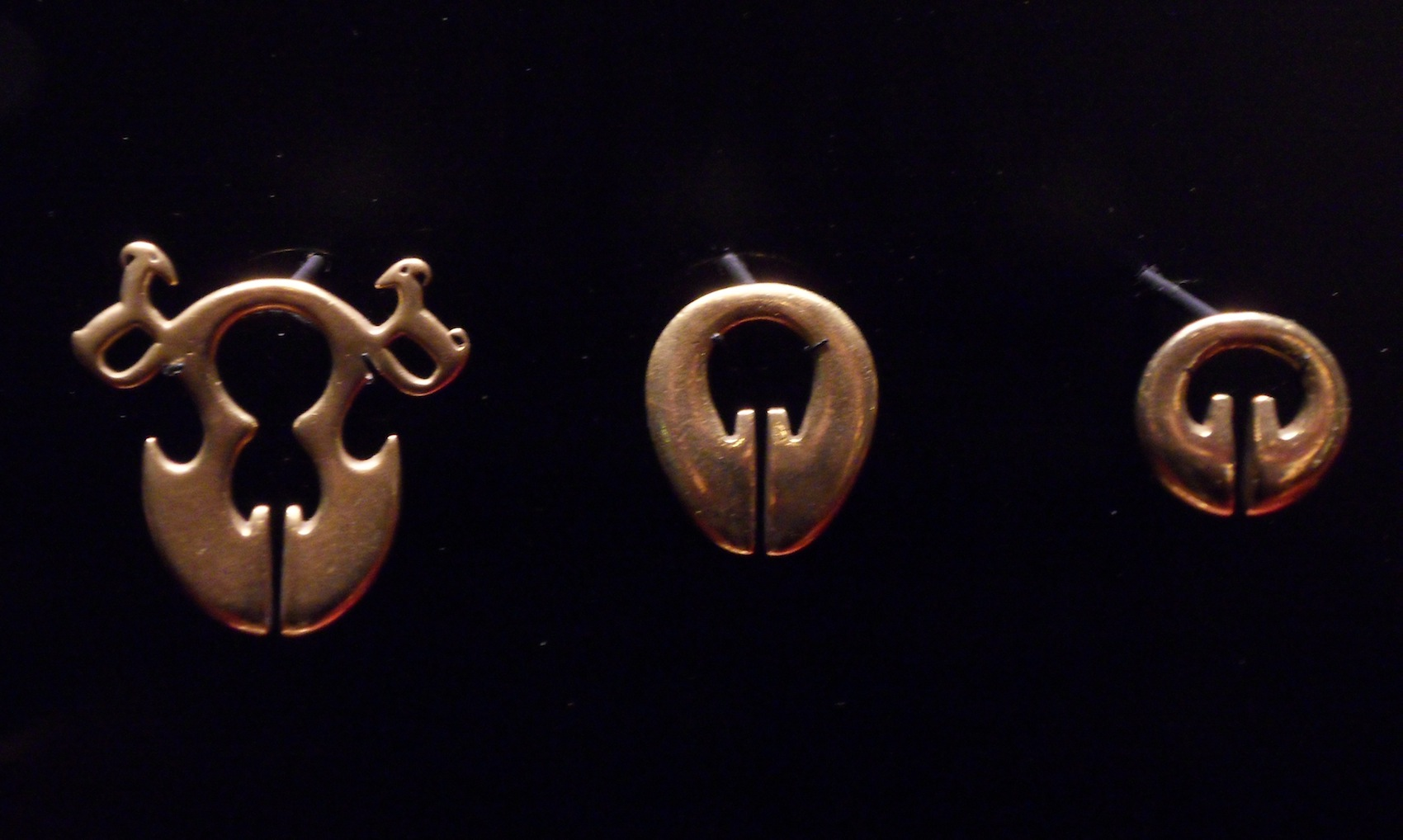
Lingling-o are jewelries that are believed to aid in fertility, and also represent a person's social standing through the material used as medium

Cosmogony or creation myths tell how the world was created, and how people came into existence. Each ethnic group has its own creation myth. In some cases, a single ethnic group has multiple versions of its creation myth, depending on locality and sub-culture. Examples:

- Bagobo – The world was created by Pamulak Manobo, who made the land and sea and the first humans. Rain comes when he throws water from the sky; showers are his spit. White clouds are smoke from the deities' fire. The sun created yellow clouds that make the colors of the rainbow.
- Bicolano – the only things that existed were water and sky. Grandsons of the sky god Languit sought to attack the sky realm to have more power. The group was led by Daga, a god who controlled winds. Languit, in anger at his grandchildren's betrayal, struck them with lightning, instantly killing them. Bitoon, who did not join the upheaval, looked for her brothers, but was also accidentally struck by Languit's lightning. The sea god Tubigan calmed Languit. The two old gods gave the bodies of their dead grandchildren light. Bulan's body became the Moon, Aldao's (or Adlao) body became the Sun, and Bitoon's body became the stars. Daga's body was not given light and became the Earth.
- Bisaya – one Bisaya cosmogony myth tells that a sacred bird of prey incited the sky and the sea to fight each other so that it could find somewhere to land, thus creating islands. Another Bisaya cosmogony myth tells that the deities Kaptan and Magwayen (or Maguayan) fought each other until, tired of war, the great bird Manaul dropped boulders upon them. The rocks became islands. Another Bisaya cosmogony myth tells Kaptan's son, wind god Lihangin and Magwayen's daughter, sea goddess Lidagat, were married and produced children. Three of these deities, led by Likalibutan, fought Kaptan, angering the supreme god; Lisuga, who was looking for her brothers, was accidentally hit by Kaptan. The four grandchildren of Kaptan and Magwayen perished. Kaptan accused Magwayen of a coup, but was later calmed down and the two deities grieved their grandchildren. Liadlao's body became the Sun, Libulan's body became the Moon, Lisuga's body became the stars, and the wicked Likalibutan's body became the Earth and had no light. Soon, a bamboo tree grew in the place where the first man, Sikalak, and the first woman, Sikabay were formed.
- Blaan – The god Melu constantly rubbed his skin to make it pure white. He accumulated a lot of dead skin. He became annoyed and used the dead skin to create the Earth.
- Bukidnon – in one Bukidnon cosmogony myth, the supreme god Magbabaya created the Earth after he saw that there was only absence – no sky and soil. He first made the eight elements, tumbaga (bronze), bulawan (gold), salapi (coins), bato (rocks), Gabon (clouds), ulan (rain), puthaw (iron), and tubig (water). From these elements, he created the sea, sky, Moon, and stars. In another Bukidnon cosmogony myth, Magbabaya (referred as Diwata na Magbabaya) created the world with the god Dadanhayan ha Sugay; before creating mankind, the two deities created the Incantus, six guardian deities that contain good and evil qualities and can send calamities if angered.
- Ibaloi – The first things in existence were the skyworld and the underworld. Peoples on each side fought. A man from the underworld hit the sun god with an arrow; the sun god afterwards pushed up the skyworld and pushed down the underworld, and then created the Earth.
- Ifugao – the universe has always existed and will always exist.
- Ilokano – The Ilokano supreme deity ordered two primordial giants, Angalo and Aran, to create the world; the giant Anglao (or Angalo) dug the earth and made mountains. Anglao urinated into holes in the earth and made the rivers and seas, then put up the sky, the Sun, the Moon, and arranged the stars.
- Kapampangan – The sky, Earth, planets, and stars were in existence before land came. During a war between the deities for the beautiful daughter of supreme deity Mangetchay the Earth was formed from stones thrown by the warring deities. Life on Earth was created by Mangetchay in remembrance of the deity's dearest daughter who died in war.
- Manobo – Creation myths by the Manobo are diverse. One Manobo cosmogony from Talakogan in Agusan valley tells that the creation of the world was due to the god Makalindung, who set the world on iron posts; another Manobo cosmogony from Argawan and Hibung rivers states that the creation goddess, Dagau, created the world. Another Manobo cosmogony from the upper Agusan says that the world is shaped like a giant mushroom and deities shake its core when angered by humans.
- Manuvu – In the beginning, there was only a formless void. The deity Manama or Sigalungan created the deities who assisted him in creation. He took two steel bars and fashioned the bars into a frame; he then scraped off his fingernails and molded them into a mass that eventually became the Earth.
- Panay – The world was said to be initially formless in the old times. The sea, sky, and earth were mixed together. From the formless mist, deities Tungkung Langit and Alunsina appeared; they married and lived in the highest realm of eternal space. One day, Tungkung Langit fought and hurt Alunsina, driving Alunsina away. In Tungkung Langit's loneliness, he created the sea and land and took his wife's jewels to create the stars, Moon, and Sun. Despite this, Alunsina chose to stay free and never returned to Tungkung Langit, an early notion of divorce.
- Suludnon – Only the sky and a wide expanse of water called Linaw at first existed. The primordial giants Laki and Bayi appeared from nowhere and were responsible for the creation of many things. Creation giantess Bayi caught the primordial earthworm which excreted the Earth; she also have birth to the wild animals that inhabit the Earth.
- Tagalog – a sacred kite caused the sky and the sea to fight; the sky threw boulders onto the sea, forming islands; the kite afterwards built a nest on an island and left the sky and sea in peace.
- Teduray – In the beginning, there was only sky and sea. Sualla (or Tullus-God) lived in the sky, while his sister Sinonggol lived in Bonggo, the land of the dead. Sualla visited the palace of the sun and touched one of the eight primordial wooden khnenentaos (statues), thus creating the first Teduray; from the rib of the man, Sualla created the first woman. When the man and woman had a child named Mentalalan, it became sick and the man sought Sualla's aid. Sualla gave a special medicine to the man, but before the man delivered the medicine to his son, a demon sent by Singgol changed it, which led to Mentalalan's death. Sualla afterwards convened a meeting with his four brothers, Mentail, Micael, Mintlafis, and Osman Ali to buy soil from the Navi. The soil was planted by Sualla at Colina, the center of the world. The soil grew, and Mentalalan was finally buried. From the boy's body, crops sprouted. In anger, Sinonggol threw her comb, which turned into the first boar that aimed to destroy the crops.

== Realms ==
Like most myths (or religions) in the world, the concept of realms focuses on Earth, heaven, and hell. These concepts are present in Philippine myth. The Philippine concept of heaven may locate it in the underworld, while hell may be located in the skyworld. These differences stem from cultural diffusion and cultural parallelism. Examples:

- Bagobo – Deities live in the skyworld, which holds various realms, each ruled by a lesser divinity. The entrance to the skyworld has numerous kampilan swords that fight without any wielder. The underworld is called Gimokudan, where spirits with heavy misdeeds are engulfed by flames, while those with little misdeeds find their bodies covered with sores as they lie in an acid that burns like lemon juice. An underworld sub-realm called Banua Mebuyan, near a black river, is reserved for children who died at their mother's breast. These souls are nourished by the many-breasted goddess Mebuyan. Children's souls who graduate from Banua Mebuyan go to another realm to join souls dead of disease. All souls pass through Banua Mebuyan before going to Gimokudan. Another underworld realm is dedicated to those slain by swords or spears, where scars stay with the soul and plants are the color of blood.
- Batak – The ancestral land of the Batak is called Kabatakan, which is found in the middle layer (fourth layer) of the universe. The universe has seven layers (lukap) consisting of a center tier (fourth layer) surrounded by ocean and inhabited by humans, animals, plants, super-human beings, and aggressive entities. Puyok, the highest sacred mountain there, is the original place of all malevolent panya’en; the Gunay Gunay, at the edge of the universe, is perceived as the place of origin of the divinities Baybay (goddess and master of rice) and Ungaw (god and master of bees).
- Bicolano – The sky and waters were the first things in existence. After divine upheaval against the god Languit, the Sun, Moon, stars, and Earth were formed from the bodies of his dead grandchildren. An unnamed giant supports the world, where his finger movements cause earthquakes. If the giant's body moves, it would end the world.
- Bisaya – The universe has seven layers; the first is uninhabited and empty. The second is Tibugnon and is made of water filled with mermaids and sea fairies who govern their kingdoms. The third layer is Idalmunon. It holds the bowels of the earth and is inhabited by underground spirits. The fourth layer is Lupan, where mankind and various supernatural beings live. The fifth layer is Kahanginan, which is the atmosphere and is the home of flying beings such as the bentohangin and hubot races. The sixth layer is Ibabaw-non, which is inhabited by special babaylans who intercede for man with spirits. The last and highest layer is Langit-non. It is the abode of Maka-ako, the creator of the universe. These seven layers can be classified in three categories, namely Kahilwayan, the skyworld realms ruled by Kaptan, Kamaritaan, the middleworld home of humans, ruled by Sidapa and Makaptan, and Kasakitan, the lowerworld realms ruled by Magyan and Sumpoy. Kasakitan has a unique sub-realm called Kanitu-nituhan that is ruled by the god Sisiburanen.
- Bukidnon – The Banting is a small circular space of immense brightness present at the beginning, surrounded by a sacred rainbow. The realm called Haldan ta Paraiso (Garden of Paradise) was created by Diwta na Magbabaya from materials provided by Dadanhayan ha Sugay. The garden is where Agtayuban rests his wings. The upperworld and underworld each have seven tiers, but only three are identifiable. The middleworld is saucer-shaped, as is the sky.
- Ibaloi – the skyworld and the underworld were once close to each other. This changed after a war between the two sides where a man from the underworld hit the sun god with an arrow. The sun god moved the two worlds apart, establishing a gap between. Earth was later established as the middleworld.
- Ifugao – Initially, there are two mythical worlds, Daya and Lagud. Daya is downstream east, while Lagud is upstream west. This notion later developed into a layered concept of the universe. Daya became the upperworld. Its four layers are Hudog, Luktag, Hubulan, and Kabunian. Kabunian is the lowest of the upperworld, and is home to the god Liddum, the deity who directly communicated with mankind for the deities of the upper layers of the upperworld. Each realm's upper layer is believed to be earthen and filled with fields and gardens, while the lower surface is made of smooth blue stone. The middleworld is the mortal world, directly below the Kabunian layer, and has the broadest circumference in the universe, as both the upperworld and the lowerworld grow successively smaller as they approach the end of the celestial globe. The lowerworld is called Dalom, which is made of an indeterminate number of layers. The souls of those who were murdered go to its lowest level. Finally, the realm of Lagud was transformed by the layered universe concept into a far eastern sub-realm region.
- Ilokano – The sky, Sun, Moon, stars, rivers, seas, and mountains were created by the giant Anglao upon the order of an unnamed supreme deity; the underworld is guarded by the giant dog, Lobo.
- Kalinga – The universe looks like a big plate (the Earth) with a smaller dome (the sky) resting on it. The sky is opaque and solid and its rim is three meters thick.
- Kankanaey – The middleworld is carried by four huge posts that stand on the lowerworld. A giant hog causes earthquakes every time it scratches against one of the posts. The lowerworld is called Aduongan and is inhabited by cannibals.
- Kapampangan – the sky, Earth, planets, and stars were in existence while land was created after the war of the gods that was caused by the beauty of Kapampangan supreme deity Mangechay's divine daughter. The gods live on faraway planets, and travel from planet to planet, with each journey taking up to hundreds of years.
- Manobo – The world is on iron posts created by the god Makalindung who lives in the center with a python. The sky is round and ends at the limit of the sea; this limit is the sea navel, where waters ascend and descend. The underworld is below the pillars of the earth and is divided into subsections where each Manobo nation is assigned a place. Sections exist for other tribes and for foreign peoples.
- Mandaya – the Earth is flat but pressed into mountains by a mythological woman. The earth rests on the back of a gigantic eel that causes earthquakes when agitated.
- Maranao – The world has seven layers. The earth and sky are divided into seven layers. Earth layers hold humans, karibangs, and a sea layer inhabited by nymphs. Each sky layer has a door guarded by a garoda; the sky's seventh layer is heaven, where the tree of life grows and whose leaves inscribes the names of all living humans. Once the leaf of a person ripens or dries and falls, the person dies. In one section of heaven, the jars containing the souls of every person alive exists; this jar area is guarded by the fearsome creature Walo.
- Palaw-an – The earthly world is composed of seven stacked plates, with a center pole connecting them. Mankind lives in the middle of the fourth plate.
- Sulodnon – The universe has three realms; the upperworld is Ibabawnon, which is divided into two realms, one for male deities and the other for female deities; the middleworld is Pagtung-an, where the earth is located; the lowerworld is Idadalmunon, housing the souls of the dead. Initially, there was only sky and an expanse of water called Linaw. Earth was established from the excretion of an earthworm found by Bayi, a creation giantess.
- Tagalog – the upperworld is Kaluwalhatian, and is the home of deities who belong to the court of Tagalog supreme deity Bathala. The middleworld is the domain of mankind. other deities and mythological races. The underworld has two realms, Maca (where the spirits of good mortals go) and Kasanaan (where the spirits of sinful mortals go). Deities dwell in the underworld, notably Sitan and his four agents. Batala is a reappearing mountain realm located in the middleworld that is filled with the sacred tigmamanukan omen creatures.
- Tagbanwa – The earthworld and the underworld are opposites – night in the earthworld is day in the underworld and vice versa. Rivers flow backward in the underworld, from sea to mountains, and rice is always eaten cold.
- Tboli – The skyworld has seven layers, where the last layer is the dwelling of the supreme couple deities, Kadaw La Sambad and Bulon La Mogoas. Earth was formed from the body of the sterile god, S’fedat. The dead inhabit various afterworlds depending on the circumstances of death. The soul of those killed via swords in battle and murder go to Kayong, where the soul is greeted with music.. Souls that die a natural death go to Mogul, which has everything a soul desires.

== Deities ==
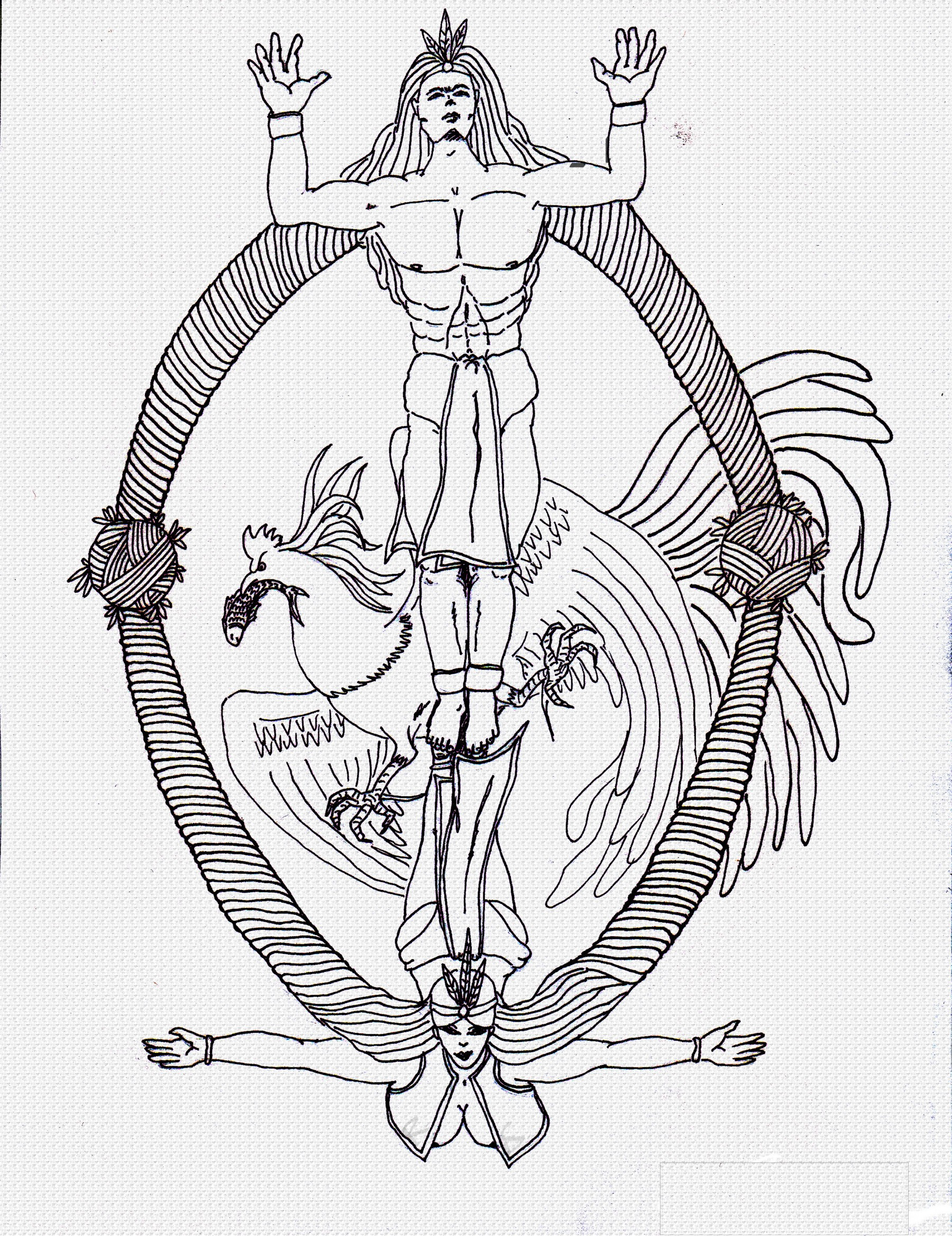
A symbol of Bathala, supreme god of the Tagalog people. The symbol also depicts a loyal anito at the bottom area and a tigmamanukan bird, which is sometimes wrongfully portrayed as a sarimanok.

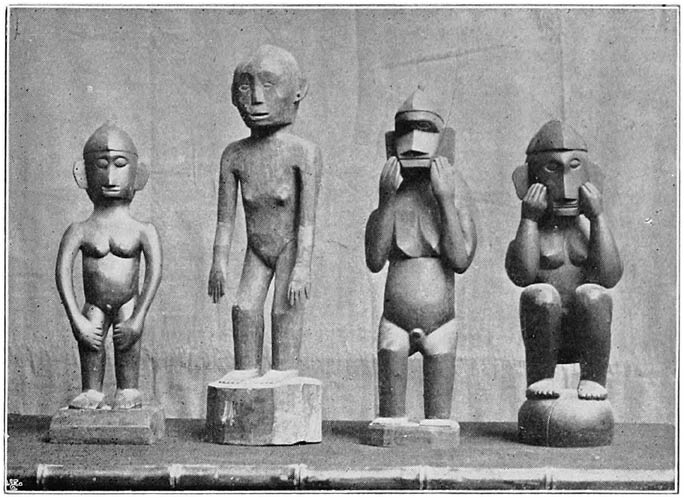
The deity Namtogan, who has paraplegia, is said to have taught the Ifugao how to craft Bulul statues, which would serve as avatars of rice deities. The statues are bathed in animal blood and sometimes given rice wine in rituals performed by a mumbaki (Ifugao shaman).

Each ethnic group has its own pantheon of deities. Some ethnic groups have a supreme deity, while others revere ancestor spirits and/or spirits of the natural world. The usage of the term "diwata" is mostly found in the central and southern Philippines while the usage of "anito" is found in the northern Philippines. In a buffer zone area both terms are used. Diwata may originate from the Sanskrit word devata (deity), anito may have derived from the proto-Malayo-Polynesian word qanitu and the proto-Austronesian qanicu, both meaning ancestral spirits. Both diwata and anito are gender-neutral terms. They translate into deities, ancestral spirits, and/or guardians, depending on the ethnic group. The concept of diwata and anito are similar to the Japanese kami. However, during the colonial era, the Spanish intentionally modified the meaning of both words because they were not in line with Christian monotheism. This modification was supported by the Americans in the early 20th century. The meaning of diwata was transformed to "fairy" or "enchantress", while the meaning of anito became "ancestors and spirits". In areas not colonized by Spain, the meanings were not changed.

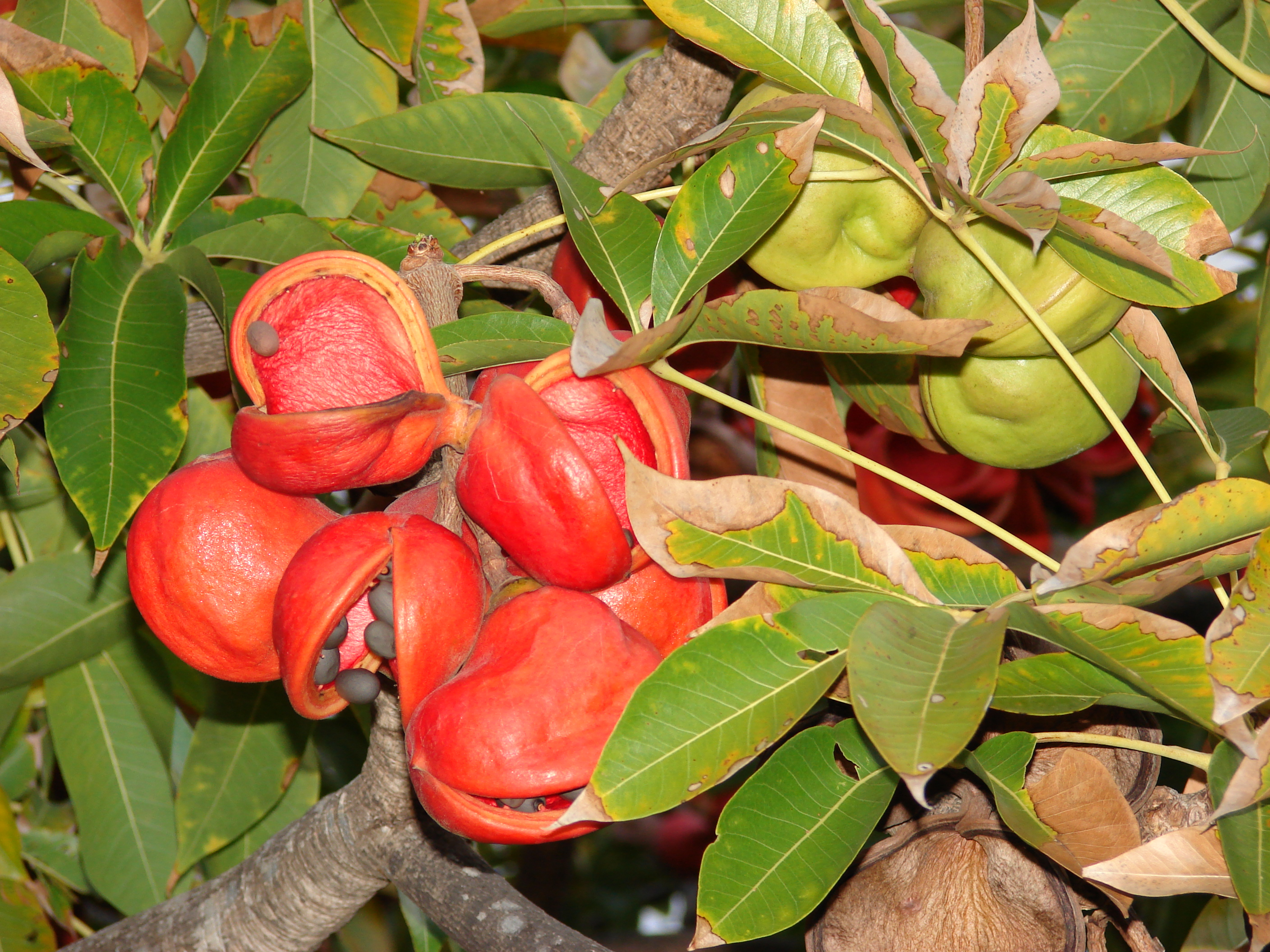
The Sambal and Dumagat peoples believe that the foul odor of takang demonyo or kalumpang (Sterculia foetida) attracts two horse-like races, namely the tulung, monstrous tikbalang-like beings, and the binangunan, fire horses.

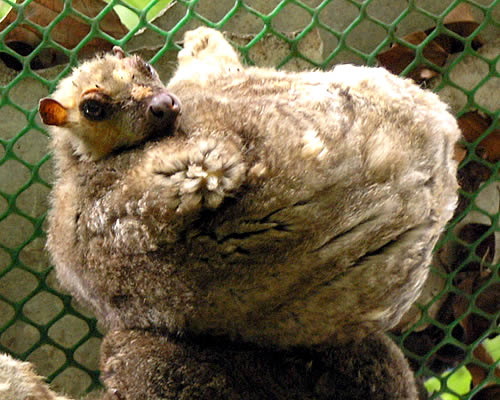
A kolago/kagwang, Cynocephalus volans. The Waray and Bisaya peoples believe that when such a creature cries loudly during dawn, there will be no rain for the whole day.

== Heroes ==
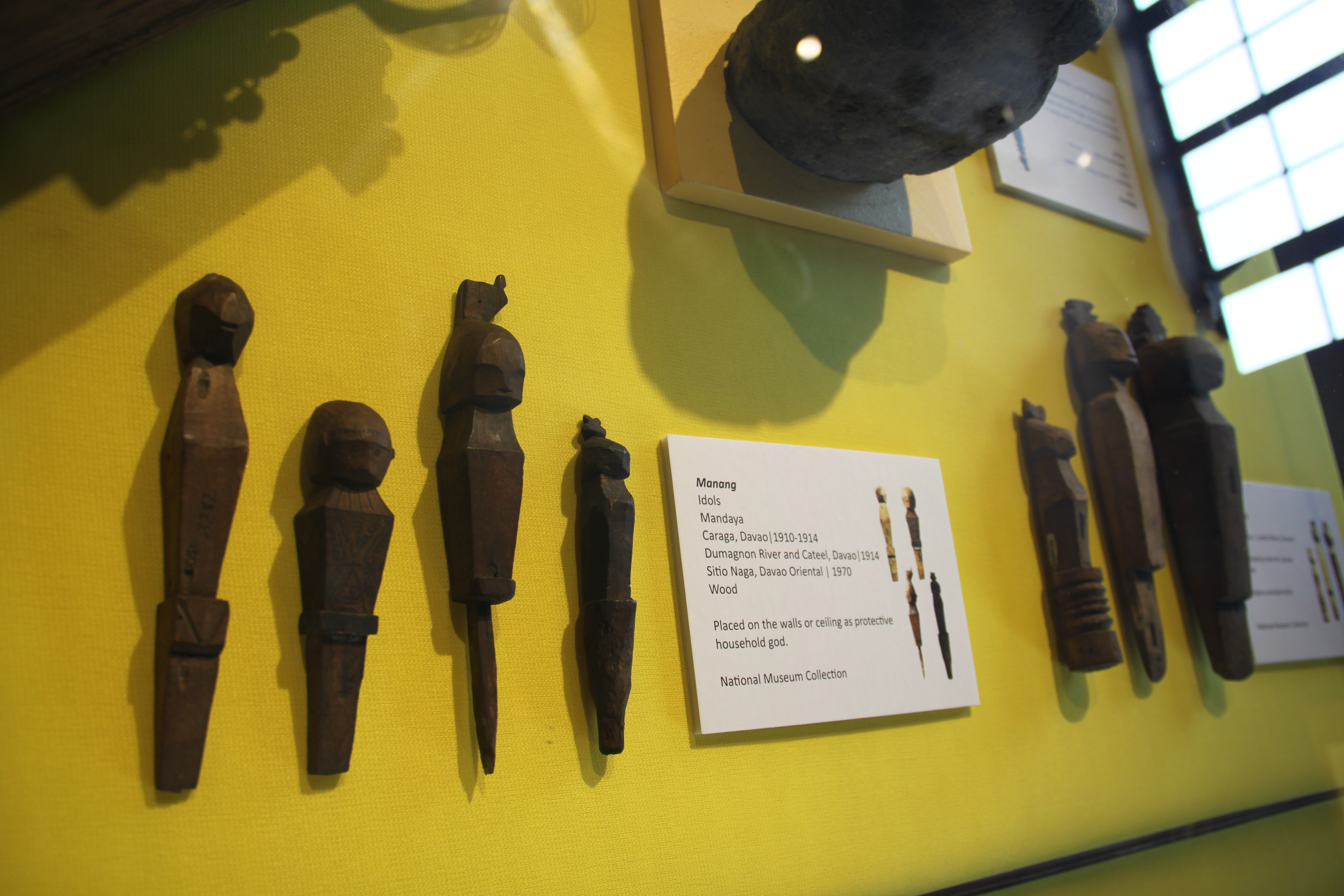
Manang, wooden idols of household deities of the Mandaya people.

Each ethnic group has stories depicting mythical heroes, notably through oral traditions such as epic poems. Spanish and American colonisation led some stories to be retrofitted with minor changes, notably to heroes' names. For the native people, many of these heroes are understood to be actual humans who lived centuries ago rather than mythical beings, analogous to Christian and Muslim beliefs that their prophets/saints were people from the past. Among these heroes:

- Sondayo – (Subanen) – He owns a magical flying scarf called a monsala, which can be ridden through lightning, in; he has the power to put people to sleep; his life and epic is much celebrated in the sacred buklog rituals
- Manggob (Mansaka) – He is raised by a giant, as recorded in the Diawot epic. He wields a golden top that had the power to bring dreams into reality. His journey focuses on his search for the golden top and his long-lost sister.
- Silungan Baltapa (Sama-Dilaut ) – He lives without sin. His life is mostly about his voyages at sea, noting the tradition of maritime journeys for the Sama (Bajau) peoples. He is believed to have absolute knowledge and possesses power to accelerate time for voyages and essentially go anywhere.
- Tugawasi (Labin Agta) – He controls the wind. His heartbeat sounds like thunder when he is fighting.
- Tud Bulul (T'boli) – He is famed as the moonspeaker, as he can speak with the Moon and the wind. His weapons are a sword named K'filan, which can stretch across one million lakes and seas, and a shield named K'lung, made out of hardened wood.
- Agyu (Talaandig and Manobo) – His journey is recorded in the Ulaging epic of Bukidnon, while his clan's story is recorded in the Ulangihan epic of Livungan Valley. He navigates the sky through his floating ship named Sarimbar/Salimbal.
- Laon and Kan (Hiligaynon) – Laon was a king of Negros; he owns a head cloth named Birang that can produce any material or food its wielder wants. Kan was a friend of Laon. Together, they slay a dragon-like monster living in Kanlaon volcano.
- Bantugen (Maranao) – His life and journeys are recorded in the Darangen chants, which has been inscribed in the UNESCO Intangible Cultural Heritage Lists. He owns a magic bangka that can navigate like a submarine. He can travel the sky, walk on water, and summon ancestral spirits.
- Indarapata and Solayman (Maguindanao and Maranao) – They are brothers who slayed numerous monsters. They own a sentient kris named Juru Pakal and a sacred plant that notifies Indarapata if Solayman (Solaiman in Maranao) has died.
- Lumalindaw (Ga'dang) – He is a powerful combat musician. He owns an ayoding, a musical instrument that guides him in making decisions, and a bolo, which produces light and music when swung.
- Tuwaang (Manobo) – He is a craftsman and can speak with the wind, ride on lightning, and use a magical flaming skein.
- Labaw Dangon, Humadapnon and Dumalapdap (Suludnon) – demigod sibling heroes recorded in the Hinilawod/Sugidanon epic. Their romantic saga inspired various art forms in Panay.
- Ligi Wadagan and Ayo (Itneg) – They are heroes from the Dulimaman epics. Lidi Wadagan, also called Agimlang, is known for his resolute defense of his community. Ayo, whose full name is Ayo, si babei nga Dulimaman, is referred to as Apo, is known for her fistfight combat skills and devotion to protect her family.
- Kudaman (Pala'wan) – He is strong and has the power to revive the dead by spitting on them with chewed betel nut. He has a purple heron named Linggisan, who he uses for transportation.
- Banna (Kalinga) – He is from Dulawon who is recorded in the Ullalim epic. He slayed powerful beings and is celebrated in various Kalinga occasions such as Bodong peace pacts.
- Urang Kaya Hadjiyula (Tausūg) – He is a freedom-loving hero of Jolo recorded in the Parang Sabil (Sword of Honor) epic. His life and journey glorifies the Tausūg's love for freedom, dignity, and honor seen in the tradition of kamaruan.
- Maharadia Lawana (Maranao) – He is a monkey-king recorded in the Maharadia Lawana epic who is gifted by the supreme deity with immortality. Scholars have noted that the epic is the localized version of the Indian epic Ramayana.
- Suac (Kapampangan) – He is cunning hunter, who defeated various monsters and later became a ruler; has two loyal friends, namely Sunga and Sacu.
- Kawlan (Kalagan) – He is a shaman of Sumlog. He has the power to communicate with spirits, heal the sick, and see the souls of the dead.
- Biuag and Malana (Ibanag, the Itawit, and the Gaddang) – They are rivals honored by the people of Cagayan Valley. They are endowed with supernatural strength by the goddess Maginganay. One version states that the two rivals eventually became friends and did various journeys and defeated many invaders which made all their people proud of them for generations.

== Other human figures ==
In folk religion numerous human figures, either full humans or demigods that may be mortal or immortal, have been attributed as actors or helpers in various events, and their actions supplement explanations of how things came to be. A few of these figures are:

- Esa’ – ancestor of Palawan's Batak people; he named the Kabatakan it Tanabag (Batak Ancestral Lands), after he followed his dog companions during a pig hunt. The landscape is said to have been created by his movement.
- Tuglibong – a Bagobo grandmother who persuaded the sky to go up to where it is now by ranting and rebuking it repeatedly
- Bugbung Humasanun – a binukot (well-kept maiden) from Bohol who tasked her suitor, Datu Sumanga, to make several mangayaw raids from southern frontiers such as Jolo and as far north as China. She received the spoils and captives that Datu Sumanga claimed in the raids.
- Ukinirot – a heavenly Bisaya hunter who shot an arrow that made a hole in the sky. Sky beings used it as an entrance to the human world. The hole was eventually blocked by a woman who tried to enter it.
- Sural – the first Bikolano to have thought of a syllabary or suyat script. He carved it on a rock slab from Libong, which Gapon later polished.
- Timungan – Kankanaey gardener who created a hole in the skyworld after digging up a gigantic sweet potato in his heavenly garden.
- Apolinatu – an Itneg mortal who was fetched by his lover, star goddess Gagayoma, to live with her in the upper world. The couple had a child named Takyayen who jumped after Apolinatu pricked Gagayoma's last two fingers.
- Dinahong – the original Bikolano potter who was believed to have been an Agta (Negrito) or pygmy. She helped the people learn cooking, making pots called coron, stoves, earthen jars, and other kitchen utensils.
- Manggat and Sayum-ay – the first man and woman in Buhid Mangyan mythology. They named all trees, animals, lakes, rocks, and spirits found within the Buhid Mangyan ancestral home.
- Pandaguan – Two Bisaya stories describe Pandaguan, although the tales may refer to two individuals with the same name. The first Pandaguan was the youngest son of the first man, Sikala, and first woman, Sikabay. He invented a fish trap that caught a gigantic shark. He was later lightly zapped by Kaptan after he boasted that he could defeat the deities. The second Pandaguan was a good man who became a comrade of the deities, but later chose to leave immortality behind, reasoning that both mortals and immortals will always be afflicted with anger and sorrow no matter how long they live.
- Puhak – a hated Manobo man who defecated on the divine stairs created by the deities to connect the mortals with the upper world. Due to his mockery, the deities permanently closed them.
- Dayang Kalangitan – a legendary queen from Tondo who co-ruled with her husband, and later became sole ruler. Fragmented Tagalog oral literature maintains that she is the only known legendary female monarch from a Tondo dynasty.
- Madlawe – a Subanen prince in the Guman epic who saved a kingdom called Pagkatolongan/. He died in battle, but was revived by the maiden Pagl'lokon.
- Sawalon – daughter of Padsilung ha Kabatlaw, enemy of Agyu. She poisoned the hero Agyu of the Olaging and Ulahingan epics. However, Agyu was revived later on.
- Tomitib Manaon – friend of Subenen hero Taake. He perished after a battle with Walo Sebang and was revived after Taake's wife and sister "fished back" his soul from a tonawan (pot of melted iron).
- Mabaning and Mabanale – close friends of Maranao hero Bantugen. After finding that Bantugan hae died, they rode their shields up to the skyworld and retrieved his soul, thus reviving him.
- Gat Pangil – ruler in Tagalog beliefs. He established the domains of Bai, Pangil, Pakil, and Mauban.
- Kalantiaw – ruler from Panay who had influence in west Negros. He enacted the Code of Kalantiaw to maintain order. He was a nationally accepted historical figure until Christian scholars debunked his existence as "mythical" and "an urban legend" in 1968. Despite this, various ethnic groups in Western Visayas, where his story originated, continue to accept him as a historical figure.
- Bulang – a Buhid Mangyan man who was washed away by torrential rain. He drowned after his foot got stuck. His body transformed into a rock called Bato Bulang in the Binagaw river. Stories say that if the rock is lifted, the entire area around it will be submerged.
- Lukbang, Mengedan and Bodek – three ancestors of the Tagakaolo people. Bodek is a woman who gave birth to Linkanan and Lampagan, who in turn became parents to two birds, Kalau and Sabitan. The birds flew away and brought back soil that their parents shaped to form the earth.
- Ubing-ubing – son of greedy parents, Apo Lakay-lakay and Apo Baket-baket. He is turned to stone by the beach. His parents were also turned into stone when the sea touched their feet. The parent's stones can be seen at Taggat Lagoon, while Ubing-ubing's stone is at Sentinela beach in Claveria, Cagayan.
- Aguingay – a legendary lady recorded in the epic Si Bulusan nan Si Aguingay. She is part of Sor beliefs. Mount Bulusan is said to be her burial ground and that of her lover Bulusan. Some stories say that their burials are the two lakes on the mountain.
- Rosa – a mortal who was pursued by a son of the sun god in Bikolano mythology. The son refused to light the world until his father consented to his marriage. The son forgot to remove his powers of fire, and accidentally set ablaze Rosa and her entire village when he visited her. The only thing that remained were hot springs.
- Bayani – a mortal who courted Tagalog goddess, Sinukan. Sinukan tasked him to build a bridge, but he was unable to complete it. Sinukan became enraged and transformed a stream into a flash-flood that engulfed the unfinished bridge and Bayani.
- Magat – a mortal man who saved a maiden from a python. He made a promise to the maiden and the deity Kabunian, but failed. The maiden became a dead crocodile and after burying her, he drowned himself in a stream, which then transformed into the Magat River.
- Old man of Kagawran – kind old man from Itbayat who brought the dead bodies of snakes that had been killed by the sun's heat into the shade. Once when he fell and could not get up, a snake with leaves in its mouth slithered beside him and put the leaves on his forehead, healing him and giving him strength. The place where the man fell has since been called Duch’narbaan (where someone fell).
- Ilang and Edo – lovers from Tayabas. Upon learning of Ilang's relationship with Edo, a poor kaingin man, her parents forbade her to see him and forced her to stay with her rich suitors. Ilang refused and chose to wither away and be buried at her lover's meeting place. When she died, the ilang-ilang grew on her grave, which Edo tended for the rest of his life.

== Other monster figures and familiars ==
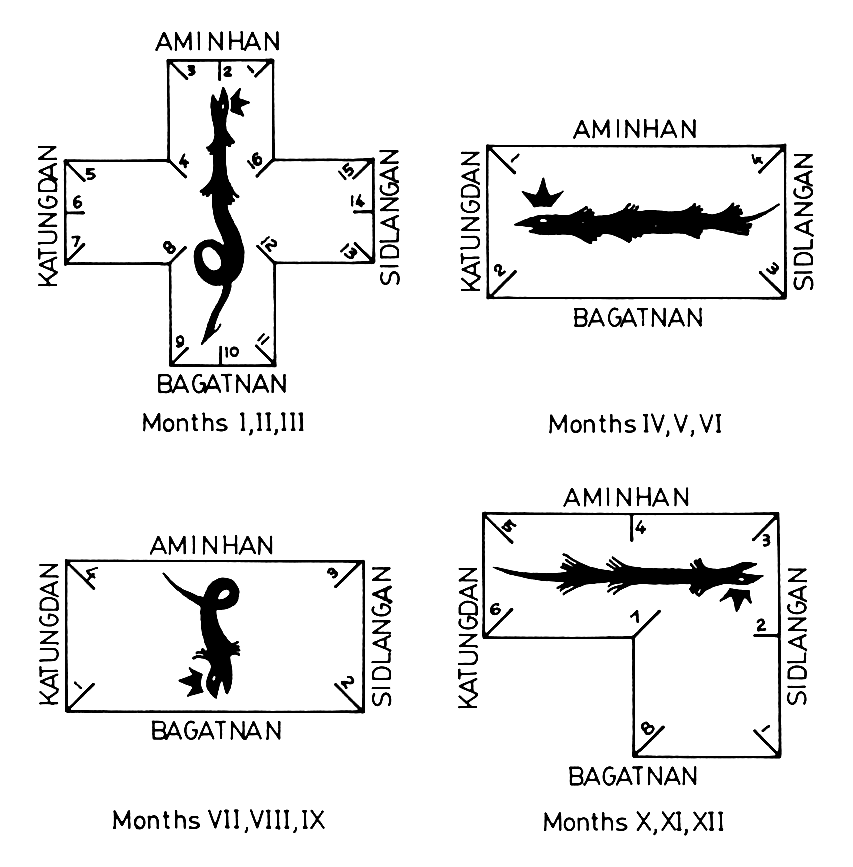
The rotation of Bakunawa in a calendar year, as explained in Mansueto Porras' Signosan (1919)

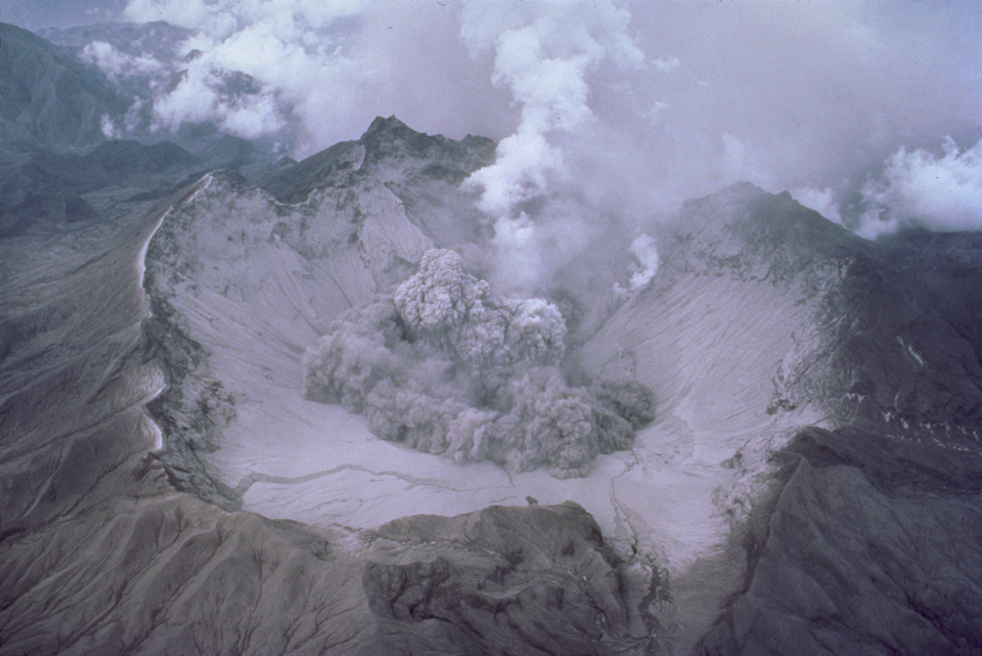
Summit caldera of Mount Pinatubo (1991). In Sambal beliefs, the volcano is said to erupt whenever the flaming "sea turtle", Bacobaco, comes out of the crater. The volcano is notable as the home of the Kapampangan god, Apûng Malyari, and the Sambal supreme deity, Malayari.

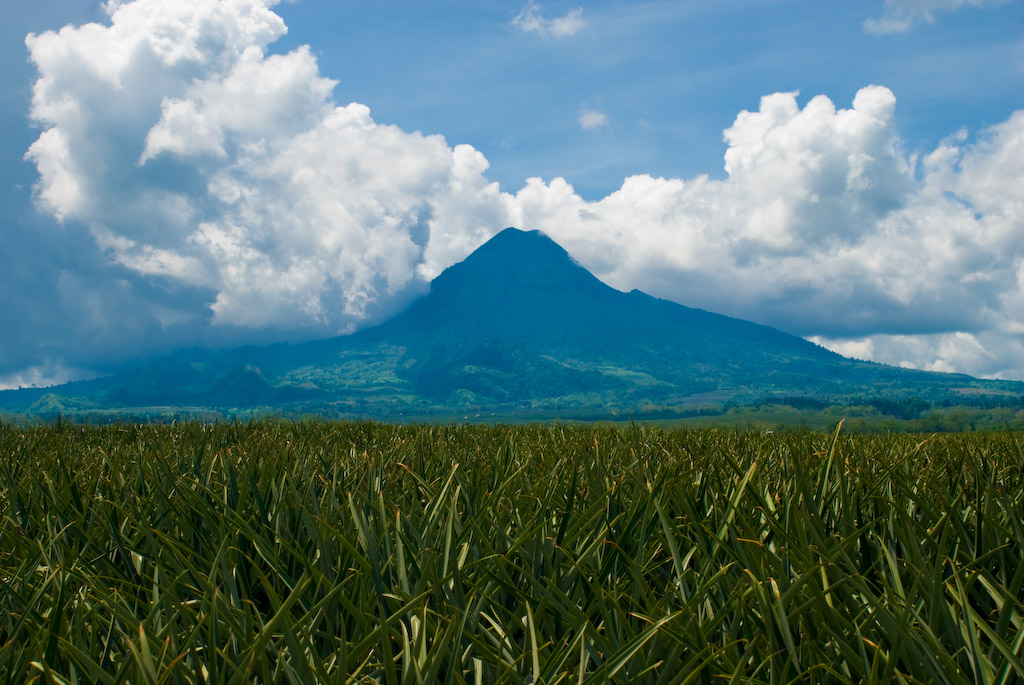
Mount Matutum is known for the many monsters that used it as a lair, such as Tarabusar, Omaka-an, and Maka-ogis.

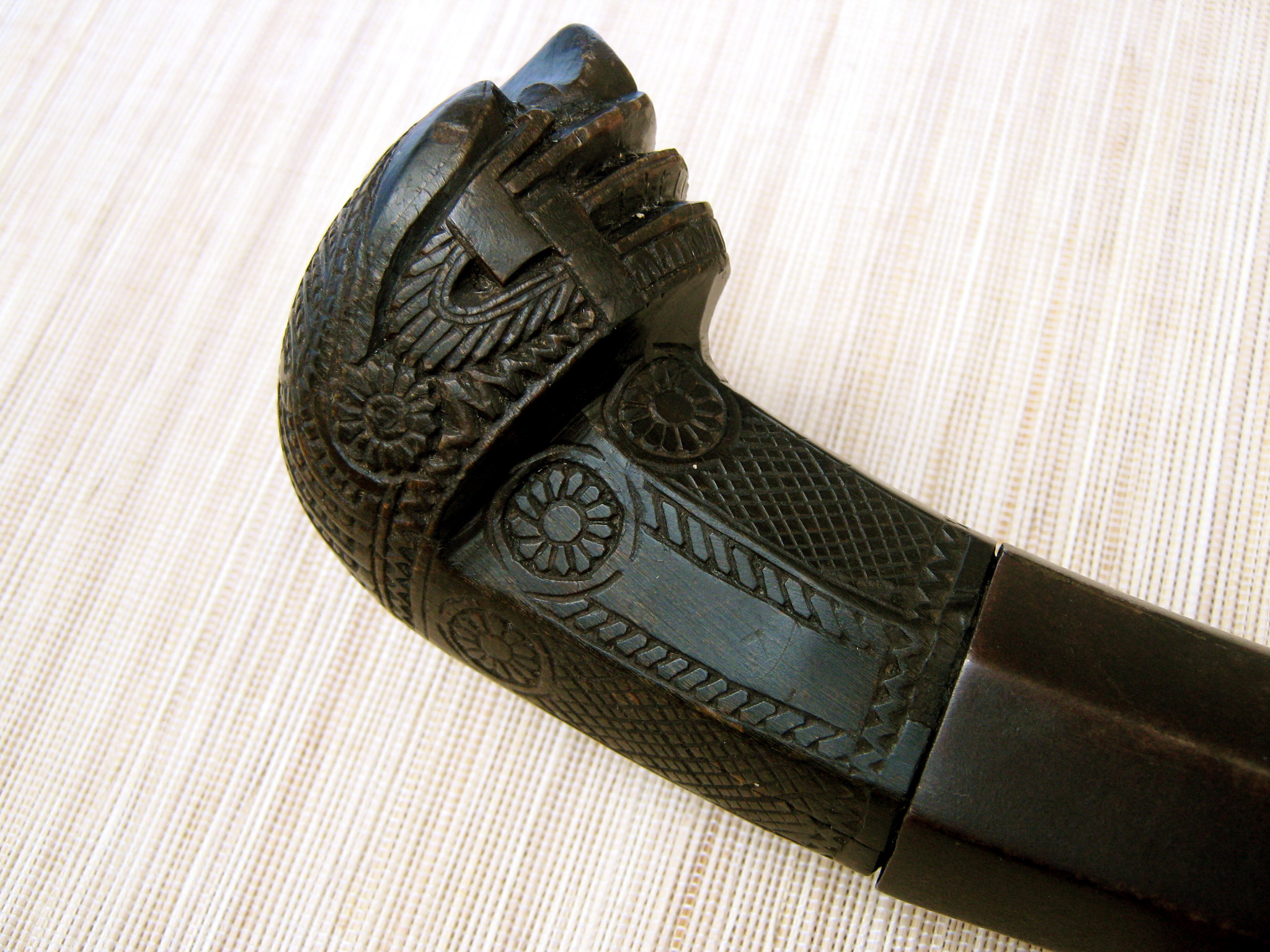
A Visayan tenegre horn hilt, depicting the sea serpent deity, Bakunawa. Outside the Visayas and Bicol regions, horn hilt depictions often change into other designs as Bakunawa only exists in Visayan and Bicolano mythologies.

== Mythical races ==
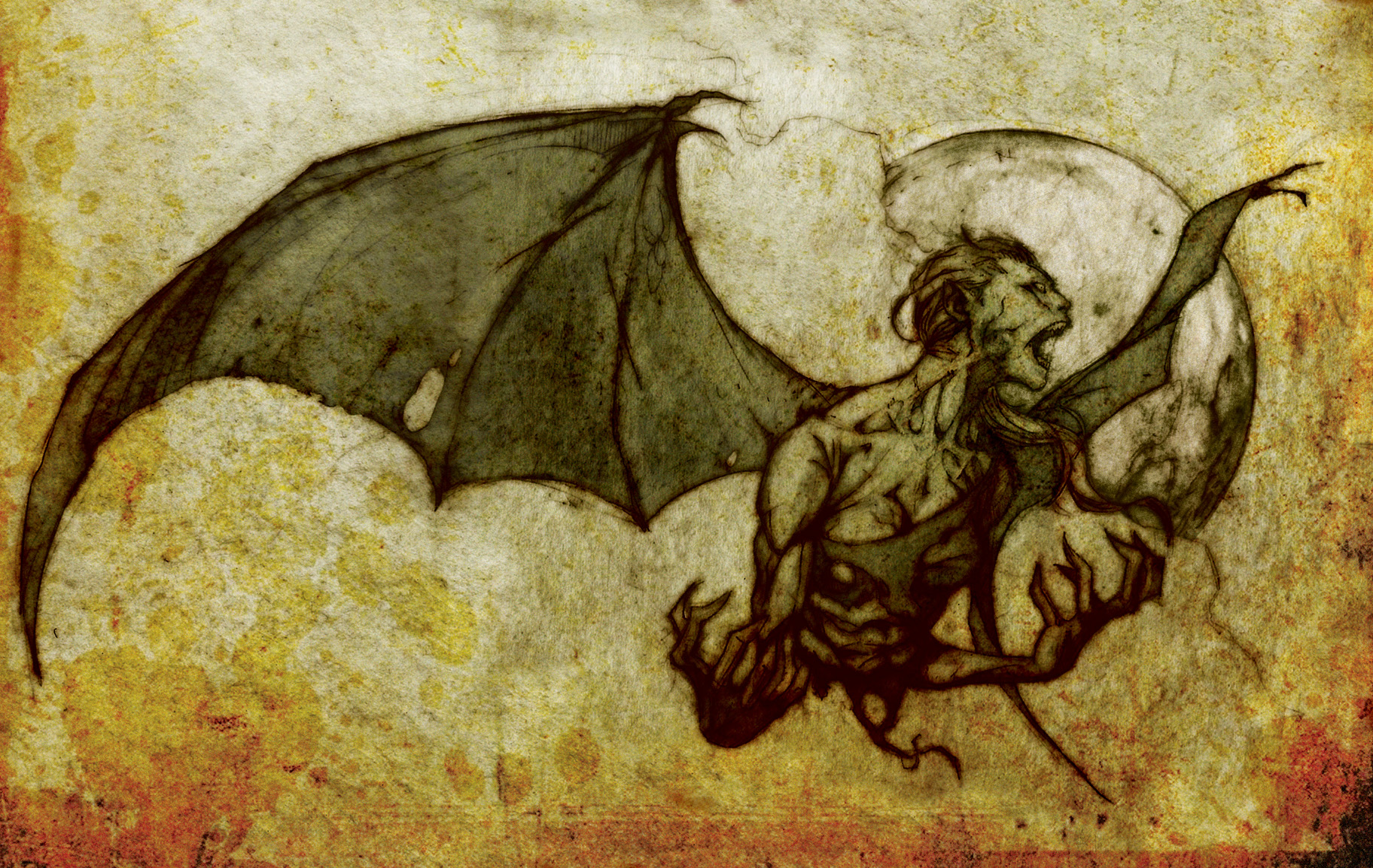
The upper part of a manananggal, hunting for food. The monster can be killed by putting salt or garlic on the wound of its lower portion left on the ground. This way, the upper part will fail to re-connect with its lower section, thus killing it once daylight comes.

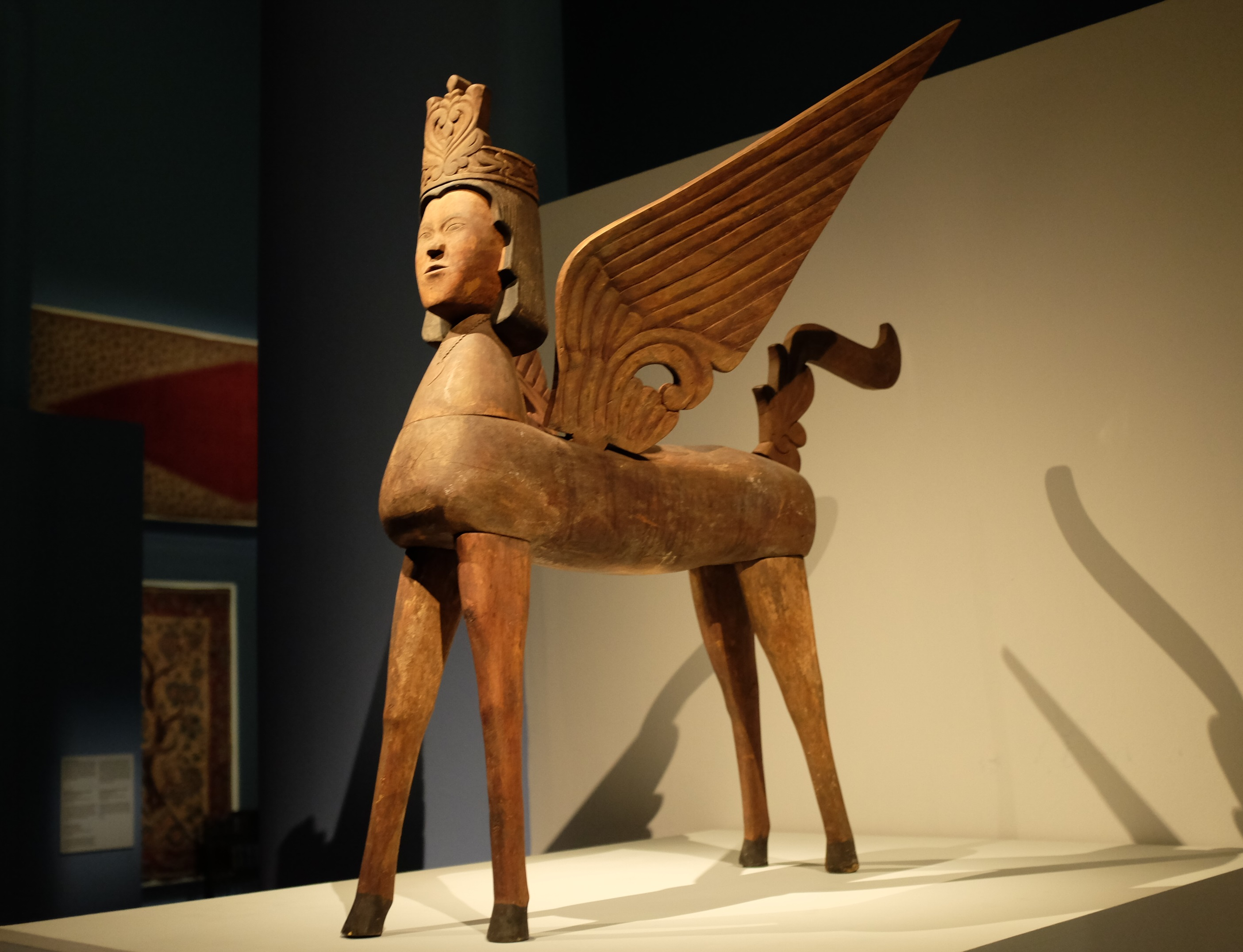
A unique sculpture of a buraq crafted by Mindanao Muslims. The belief on buraqs was inputted by Arab traders and missionaries

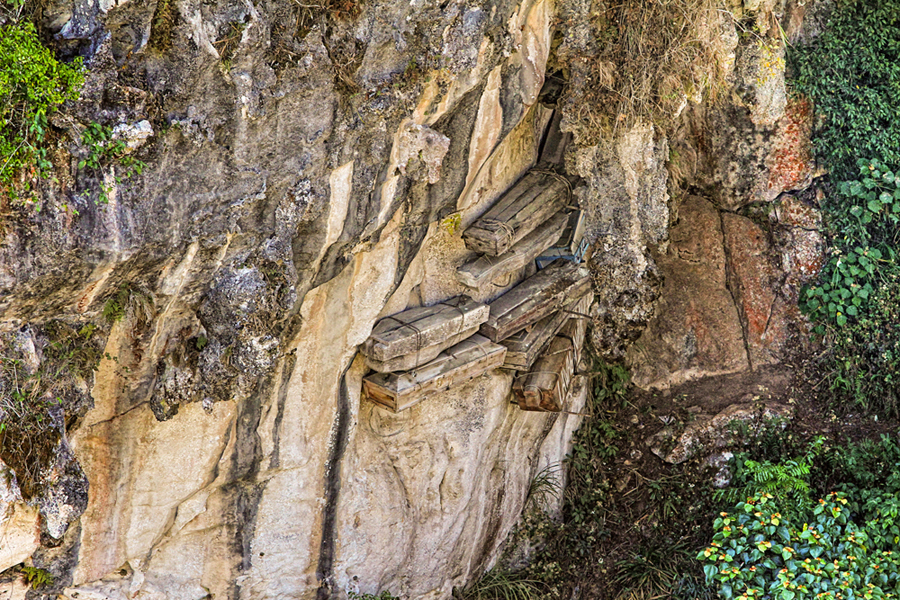
Hanging coffins is a traditional practice in Sagada. The northern Kankanaey people believe that by doing so, the spirits will be closer to heaven while joining the community as protectors of the villages.

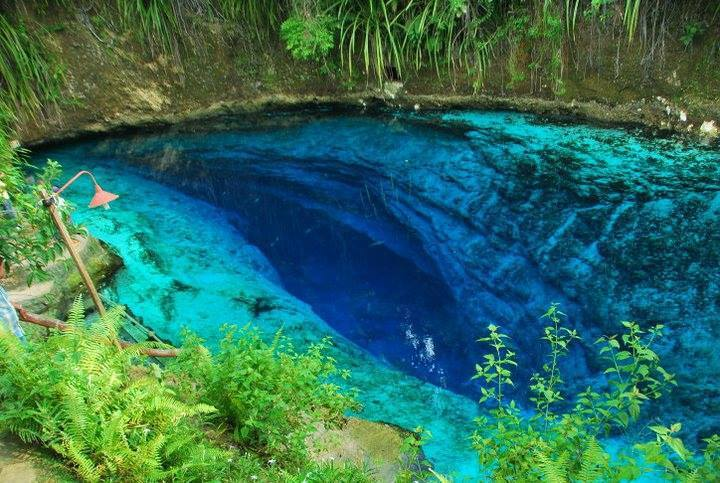
The Hinatuan Enchanted River is believed to be protected by supernatural beings. The local Surigaonon people believe that certain fishes in the river cannot be caught due to enchanted protection.

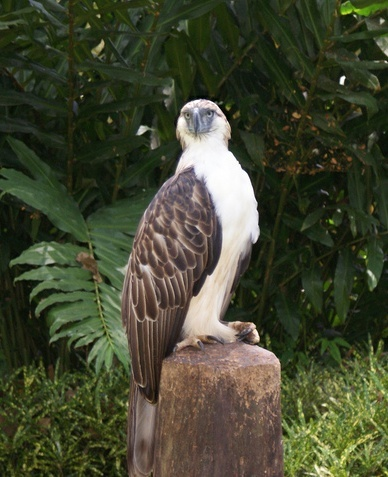
The critically endangered Philippine eagle is regarded by numerous ethnic groups in the Philippines as sacred. In Bagobo Tagabawa mythology, a hero chieftain named Banog, who founded four domains, was said to have been named after the local name for the raptor.

Among the mythical creatures of Philippine mythology are:

- Abat and Awok (Waray) – two similar races that segment like the Manananggal. They can fly with their head and hands.
- Aghoy (Waray) – fair-haired and handsome beings that resemble twenty-year old well-built humans. They are friendly to people and will guide those who are looking for something lost.
- Agta – black beings in Eastern Visayas. They are twice as tall as an average human. They live in santol trees, mangroves, and swampy places and love to smoke.
- Amalanhig – walking corpses. A dead person can turn into an amalanhig (or amaeanhig) if its body is not claimed by a family member. During the colonial era, the Spanish weaponized the belief, claiming that an un-baptized person will turn into one.
- Angongolood (Bicol) – swamp gorilla-like beings who jump and hug victims, which are transformed into trees. They are spooked by noises made by striking the side of boats.
- Annani (Ibanag) – unfriendly beings who, when offended, must be offered a fat hog, uncooked carabao head, rice cakes, coconut milk, sugar, bibingka, basi wines, cigars, and a fee of a dozen betel nuts.
- Awan-ulo-na/Pugot (Ilokano) – headless humanoid shapeshifter that lives in trees. They have a neck-stump that bubbles and froths while dancing.
- Balbal (Tagbanua) – they can sail through the air like a flying squirrel. They have curved nails and a long tongue. They eat corpses.
- Bannog (Tinguian, Isneg, and Ilokano) – gigantic birds. They live in huge trees or cliffsides. They darken the night when overhead.
- Bawa (Aklanon) – centaur-like beings. They are attracted to ueang (freshwater shrimp). They stalk people, but stop if the person crosses a river or stream.
- Binangunan/Binangenang (Dumagat) – horses with fire on their backs from head to tail. They live in balete trees and bring danger, sickness, and death. They may be sighted on Mount Pinatubo
- Biraddali (Tausug and Samal) – angels "with the glowing beauty of a rainbow".
- Boroko (Ilokano) – Winged segmenting beings similar to the Manananggal, but may abduct young humans to keep as housekeepers. They feed the humans with flesh and liver. They can transform into a bird,
- Bulaw (Buhid Mangyan) – beings who live on mountains and. They fly from one peak to another and light the path with a torch made of human bone. Bulaw means 'shooting star'.
- Caranget – dwarves or earth spirits that can turn into four forms, including the siloit, which produces as whizzing sound.
- Danag (Isneg) – blood-drinking human-like beings.
- Dawendi – height-shifting and night-dwelling beings from Leyte. Their height depends on the tree or building they inhabit.
- Gakit – sacred ducks that saved a divine woman who fell from the sky. They later landed the woman on Bohol, where she became the ancestor of Boholanos.
- Higante – an umbrella term adopted from the Spanish, which literally means 'giant'. Corresponding races include kapre, ikugan, and bungisngis.
- Idaemonon (Aklanon) – earth spirits with long fingers that they use to poke the earth from underground every morning and afternoon. Stepping on their poking finger will lead to sickness.
- Kaperosa (Tagalog) – female ghosts who wear flowing white robes or gowns. They are called amang in Ilokano beliefs
- Karibang (Maranao) – short, plump, long-haired earth spirits living in the second layer of the earth. They possess magical powers and are generally invisible to mankind.
- Kibaan (Ilokano) – small creatures with gold teeth and backward feet; live in bangar trees (Steroulia foetida). They love singing in small groups and strumming guitar-like instruments.
- Lewenri (Romblon) – handsome and music-loving people who appear to boys and girls by moonlight.
- Mahomanay (Bagobo) – male, fair-skinned, handsome spirits who are beneficent to nature. Caretakers of animals who live in balete trees.
- Malawan (Buhid Mangyan) – spirits who live in springs within deep forests.
- Mambubuno – mermaids with two tails. They live within the waters of Zambales.
- Manananggal (Bicolano) – similar to Manananggal, but instead of a body segmented at the torso, the body is segmented at the neck. It leaves its body on the ground while the head and internal organs fly to seek food at night.
- Mangalok – beings from Iloilo who target the liver of the dead. They magically exchange a corpse with a banana stalk. They perch on top of a victim's coffin while bearers carry it. They laugh invisibly while nibbling on the victim's liver.
- Mangalo - malevolent goblins or dwarves that the deaths of young individuals from disease are caused by Mangalos, According to their lore, these beings consume the bowels of their victims, leading to their demise. This belief reflects the absence of knowledge about the scientific causes of disease, such as the corruption of bodily humors or infections.
- Mansalauan – birds the size of a large bat from Cebu. They have red jewel-like eyes, a lizard-like head, a tail covered with long hair, large wings, a sharp tongue, feet like those of a man, and hands like those of a monkey.
- Marukos (Ilocano) – crossroads demons, known for waylaying travelers and causing them to be lost until the entire group is drowned by flashfloods. Particularly associated with the etymological legends of Rosario, La Union.
- Nuno sa punso – dwarves living in termite mounds in various myths; inflict sickness to people who destroy or damage its home. It loves playing the siklot and sungka. A similar creature in Ilokano mythology is the lakay.
- Omayan (Mandaya) – rice field-inhabiting dwarves.
- Popo (Bicolano) – tall and slender beings who snort. Their eyes can drain the energy of people, causing pain and even death.
- Sagay – dwarves from Surigao who live in gold mines. They exchange gold for chicken blood and they sometimes steal children at night.
- Santelmo (Visayan and Tagalog) – fireball creatures. the term 'santelmo' was adapted from Spanish although indigenous names are used in various mythologies. They are called mangalayo by the Suludnon people and allawig by the Ilokano. In Iloilo Santelmos are slowly created, in essence when sunlight hits freshly spilled blood.
- Silagan – beings from Catanduanes who attack white cloth-wearing people. They tear out the liver and eat it and extract the entrails through the anus.
- Sirena – umbrella term for various merfolk races. Mermaids usually have familiars in the form of golden centipedes. Races include mambubuno, magindara, and ugkoy.
- Tamahaling – female red-skinned earth spirits that may turn maleficent and live in balete trees. They are the keepers of animals in Bagobo mythology.
- Taw Gubat (Buhid Mangyan) – jungle men who live in the deep forests of central Mindoro.
- Thalon – obscure dog-like beings with human feet that live in Zamboanga Del Sur. Males are called mhenamed thalon and are simple trickster spirits. Females are called thamad thalon and are man-eating beasts.
- Tigayones – enchanted beings who live in Tigayon Hill in Aklan. They aided mankind by lending things made of gold. They stopped when the things they lent were not returned.
- Tinakchi (Kalinga) – mysterious and highly respected mountain-dwelling beings. They are known as the "people who can't be seen" and live on the sacred Mount Kechangon of Lubuagan. Their powers are mysterious. They can use teleportation and invisibility at will.
- Tiyanak/Toyol (Tagalog, etc.) – playful and sometimes deadly monster babies or children. They are called patianak by Mandayas and muntianak by Bagobos. Tulayhang (Suludnon) – mud crab-like creatures. Disturbing them causes illness.
- Triburon (Bicolano) – monster sharks or rays with wings used for flying. Triburons were tamed by Handyong.
- Tulung/Tuwing (Sambal and Aeta) – horse-like beings who have clawed feet, long hair, and large testicles. They live on Mount Pinatubo.
- Uko – black creatures. They have thick, inside out lips and live in guava trees.
- Umalagad – sacred lucky snakes that were carried by various ethnic groups in the Visayas on sea voyages.
- Ungo and bawo – They are from the Visayas and are similar to kapre. Muscular men in loincloth punish people by giving a big latik on the head or stealing the victim's firewood or basket of clothes. They love to smoke large pipes.
- Wakwak – beings from Surigao who feed on human fetuses and drool at the sight of a pregnant woman.

== Mythological items ==
A variety of known mythical objects appear in oral literature, notably in epics and stories concerning the deities, heroes, and mythical creatures. Examples:

- Aswang black chick – black chicks used by the aswang race to pass-on their powers on a descendant.
- Birang of Laon – a large head-cloth that can provide anything the wearer wants. It belonged to King Laon of Negros.
- Biringan black rice – black rice found only in mythical Biringan city. It is offered by the Biringanon to guests, If a guest eats it, he or she will be unable to ever leave Biringan.
- Golden Shell of Kaptan – the supreme god of the Bisaya people, Kaptan, has a golden shell that allows its user to transform into whatever or whoever he or she wants. The shell was intended as a gift to Maguayen, goddess of the sea, but the god Sinogo stole it before it was delivered. Sinogo was later captured by Kaptan and imprisoned as a crocodile.
- Jaru Pakal – a sentient kris that can target foes without a wielder. It is used by the epic brother-heroes of the Maranao people, Indarapatra and Sulayman.
- Kibaan powder – mystic powders possessed by the Kibaan race that cause skin disease or other maladies.
- K’lung and K’filan – weapons used by the epic hero of the Tboli people, Tud Bulu of Linay Mogul. K’lung is a wooden shield, while K’filan is a bolo sword that can extend to one million lakes and seas, capable of slashing an entire army.
- Monsala (Subenen) – flying scarves recorded in the Sondayo epic. At least three scarves appear in the epic, one of which was used by Sondayo, the Subanen's main epic hero.
- Mutya – small jewels that drop from the heart of banana trees during a full moon or during the midnight of Good Friday. They give its wielder powers such as strength, invisibility, and youth rejuvenation.
- Sarimbar/Salimbal – a golden ship that "can accommodate an entire tribe" and fly. The ship is owned by epic hero, Agyu, who is recorded in Ulaging and Ulahingan epics.
- Takalub (Bukid) – the source of traditional authority. The two kinds are the Gilling (sacred black stick), and the Baklaw (sacred bracelet made of two boar tusks). The Takalub were given by the hero Agyu to his child, Tuluyan; anyone who has the Takalub will have kalaki (talent and power) to settle disputes, and good people will become linibung (immortal).
- Tikbalang hair – locks of golden hair naturally present among members of the Tikbalang race; getting the locks make a Tikbalang loyal to the wielder

== Status, recognition, protection, and promotion ==
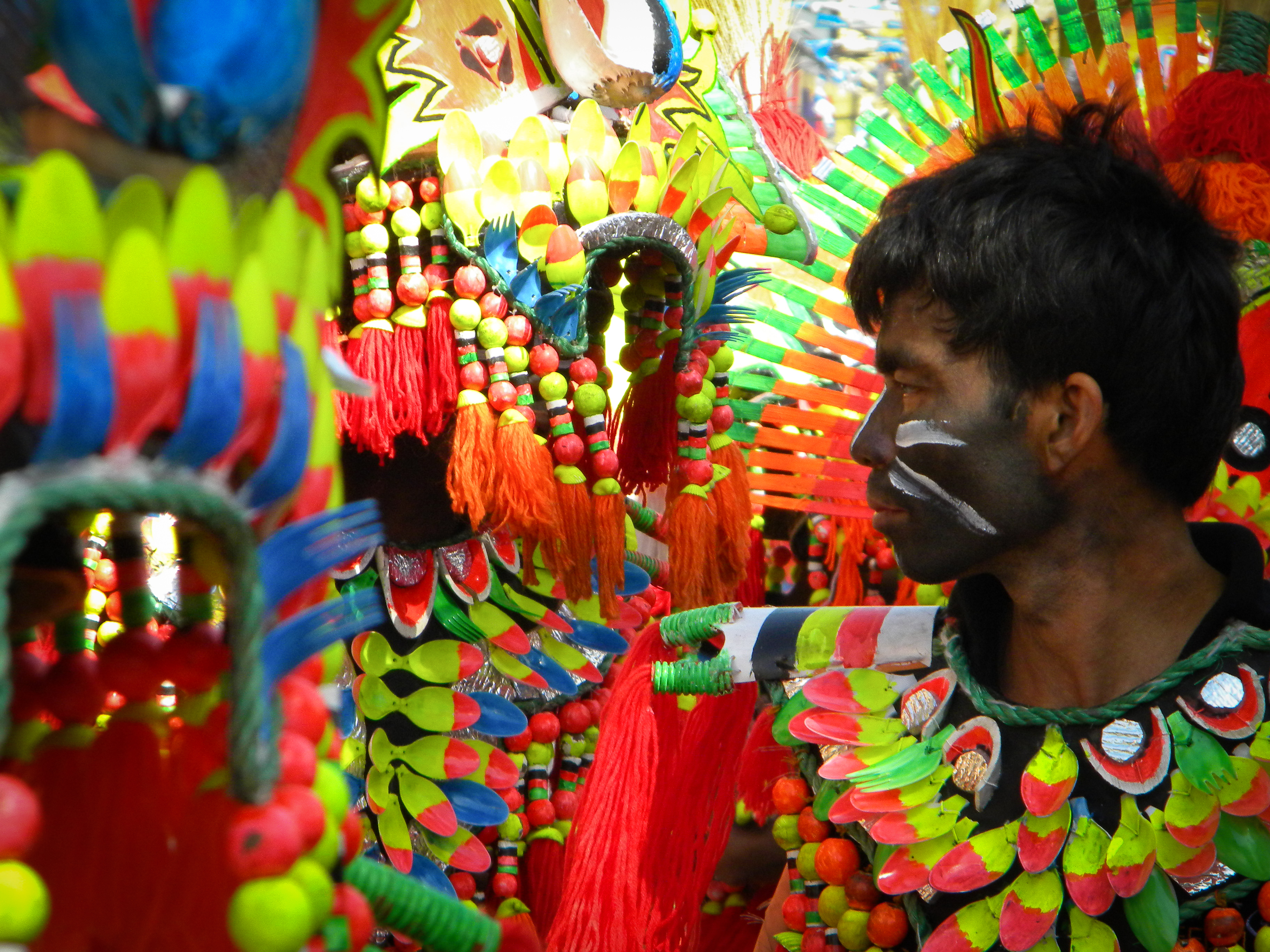
Aklanon participants at the vibrant Ati-Atihan festival, which honors the Ati people and the Aklanon since around 1200 AD. Spanish colonization used Catholic figures to replace the festival's original roster of honorees.

At least two oral literatures, the Hudhud and the Darangen, and one indigenous game, Punnuk, appear in UNESCO Intangible Cultural Heritage Lists. Additionally, four Philippine paleographs (still used by the Hanunoo Mangyan, Buhid Mangyan, Tagbanwa, and Palaw'an peoples), with the inclusion of Ambahan poetry, are in the UNESCO Memory of the World International Register, in a single entry. The José Maceda Collection in the Memory of the World Register contains an array of traditional music from the Philippines containing stories from ethnic mythologies.

Asteroid 1982 XB was named 3757 Anagolay, after the Tagalog goddess of lost things, Anagolay.

The Philippine Registry of Cultural Property (PReCUP) is the national registry that consolidates in one record all cultural property deemed important to the nation's cultural heritage, tangible and intangible. The registry safeguards Philippine heritage elements, including oral literature, music, dances, ethnographic materials, and sacred grounds. The National Integrated Protected Areas System (NIPAS) Law protects certain Anitist sacred grounds.

Philippine mythology and the mythical creatures, are promoted globally in book bazaars, films, art galleries, online games, and educational courses. Both the National Commission for Culture and the Arts (NCCA) and the Cultural Center of the Philippines (CCP) support the promotion of Philippine mythology.

== See also ==
- Aswang
- Engkanto
- Indigenous Philippine folk religions
- Philippine literature
  - Philippine folk literature
- Philippine mythical creatures
- Philippine witches
- Dambana
- Souls in Filipino cultures
