= Yamabito =

Japanese legendary mountain people

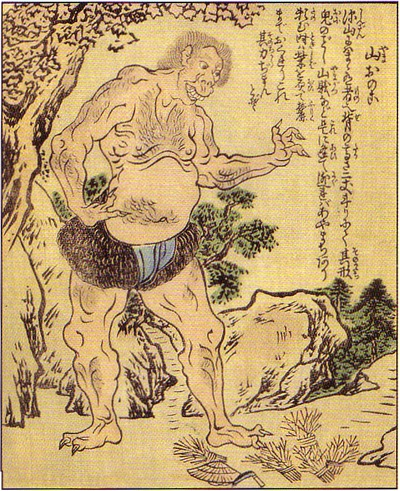

The term yamabito (山人) or sanjin, as understood in Japanese folklore, has come to be applied to a group, some scholars claim, of ancient, marginalized people, dating back to some unknown date during the Jōmon period of the history of Japan.

The term itself has been translated as "mountain people", or as Dickins interprets the word as "woodsman", but there is more to it than that. It is from texts recorded by historian Kunio Yanagita that introduced, through their legends and tales, of the concept of being spirited away into Japanese popular culture.

== Tono Monogatari ==
According to Yanagita, the Yamabito were "descendants of a real, separate aboriginal race of people who were long ago forced into the mountains by the Japanese who then populated the plains" during the Jōmon period.

Yanagita wrote down these folktales in the book Tono Monogatari, though as author Sadler notes:

The book is a classic of folklore, but it has none of the usual trappings of a volume of folktales. There is no attempt to classify. There are no headings and no categories. The book is a ramble, and a hodge-podge. You will find fairy tales and legends and even an occasional myth in it; but you will also find the stuff of the tabloid newspapers: Distraught youth murders mother with sharpened scythe or, Hayseed knifes mom.

== Kamikakushi ==
One of the concepts Yanagita presents in Tono Monogatari is that of, literally, being spirited away, or kamikakushi. As author Sadler relates:

A young girl is at play under the pear tree in her yard one evening toward dusk, and in the next instant she is gone, vanished. Thirty years later the occupants of her old family home are surprised by a visitor whom they recognize at once as this child, now grown to womanhood. She looks haggard and old. She is silent, except for the half-apologetic remark that she 'just wanted to see everyone once more,' and then she departs as silently and mysteriously as she came. Evidently no one attempts to follow her, and no one asks her to stay. Her story remains untold. No one wants to hear it. They know what it is. She is kamikakushi ... literally, she has been hidden by the kami, by the spirits. She has been enslaved by some supernatural being.

== The Yamabito debate ==
The stories found within Tono Monogatari are not without their detractors. Minakata Kumagusu was highly critical of Yanagita's research, "heaping severe criticism and ridicule on belief that ... the Yamabito ever existed." According to records, between 1915 and 1916, the two scholars exchanged letters debating the existence of the Yamabito. In one famous letter, dated December, 1916, Minakata makes the following claim that while working with an assistant in the Wakayama region of Japan:

while collecting insect specimens, half-naked in the countryside one hot day eight years ago, we came charging down the mountain slope, waving our sticks and insect nets at a group of village woman at the base of the mountain. The startled women turned and ran screaming that 'kami had turned from rocks and stone into monstrous men'. That ... was your Yamabito.
