= Angalo =

Legendary creation giant from Ilocano mythology

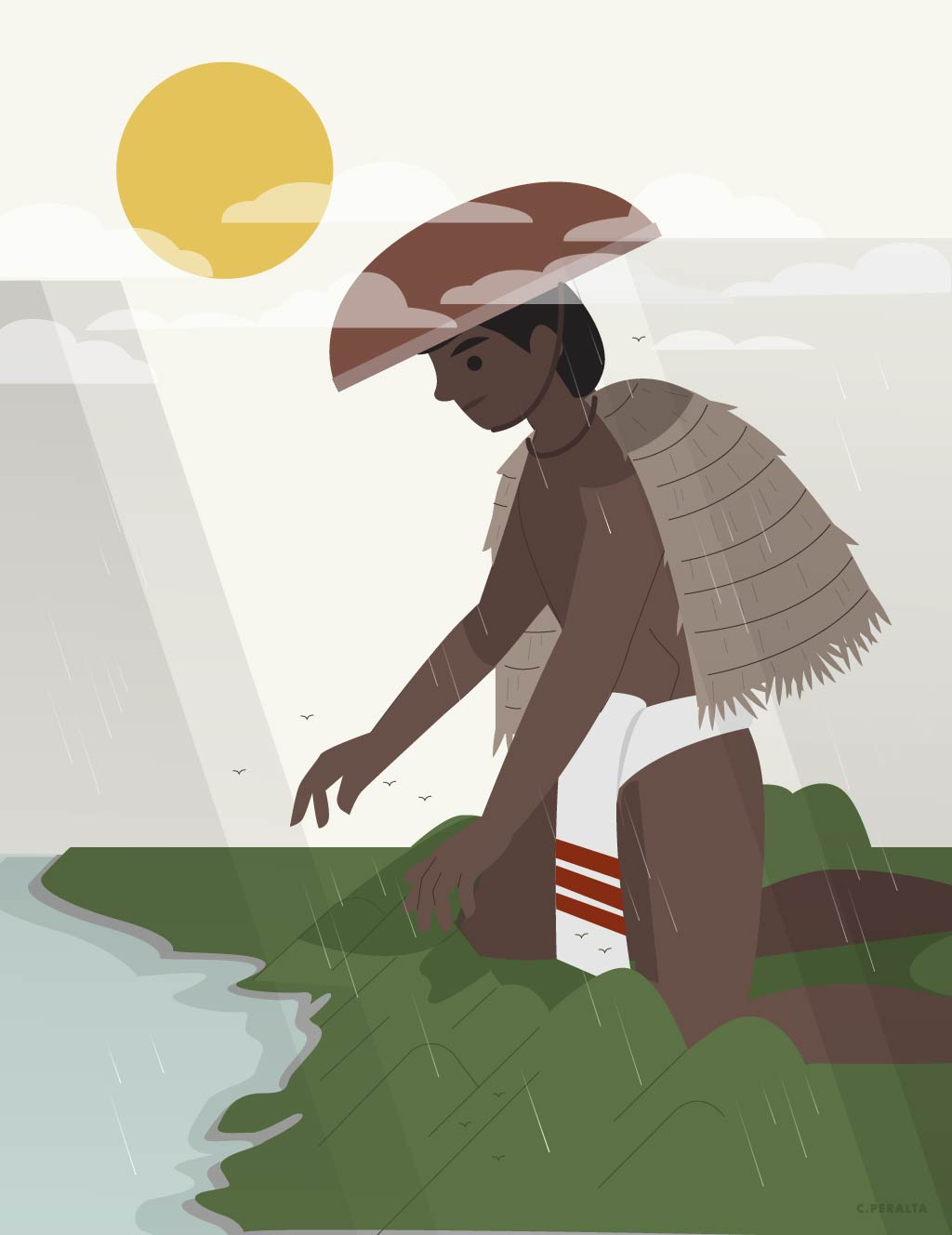
- Gender: Male
- Region: Philippines

Angalo is a legendary creation giant from Ilocano mythology with pre-Hispanic origins in the Ilocos region of the Philippines. Angalo was the first man, and son of the god of building. Angalo's head touched the sky and he could easily walk from the Ilocos Region to Manila in one step. Through Angalo's actions, he shaped the hills and mountains of Luzon, formed the oceans by urinating in holes in the ground which formed rivers, and put up the sky, sun, moon and stars. Pre-Hispanic Ilocano people attributed the sound of thunder as Angalo's voice, earthquakes as his movements, and rainbows his hanging G-string. Angalo was not alone, he had a giant wife named Aran and together they had three daughters whom the Ilocano, Aeta, and Igorot people are descendants.

== Landscape Mythology of Angalo ==
Throughout the Ilocos Region, Abra, and Benguet, many geological formations are attributed to Angalo and his family. Small valleys and gulches in the Cordillera Central mountain range are often noted as the giant footprints of Angalo such as found in Sudipen, La Union and San Quintin, Abra. In addition, large caves in the Ilocos Region and Abra are often described as being former shelters for Angalo's wife and his daughters.

In Santa Maria, Ilocos Sur, the large depressions and pools around Pinsal Falls are said to be created when Angalo knelt and drank from the falls.

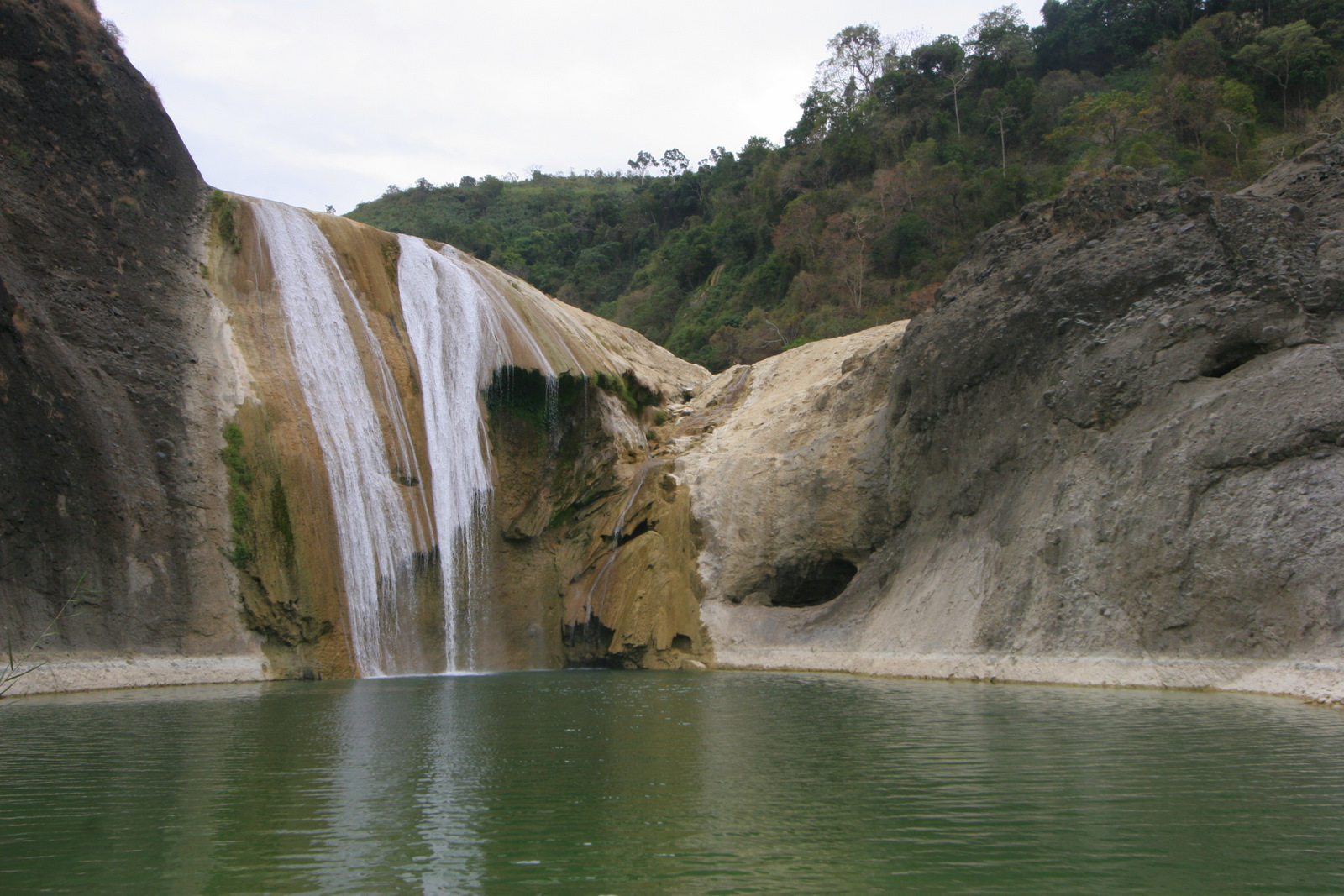
Pinsal Falls

In Santa, Ilocos Sur, the Banaoang Gap, a water gap where the Abra River breaks the Ilocos mountain range, is said to be created by Angalo. Long ago, the Abra region east of the Ilocos mountain range was once a lake. One night, Angalo slept on the shore of the lake, and as he slept, he kicked the Ilocos range hard and in doing so, unleashed the lake and created the Banaoang Gap.

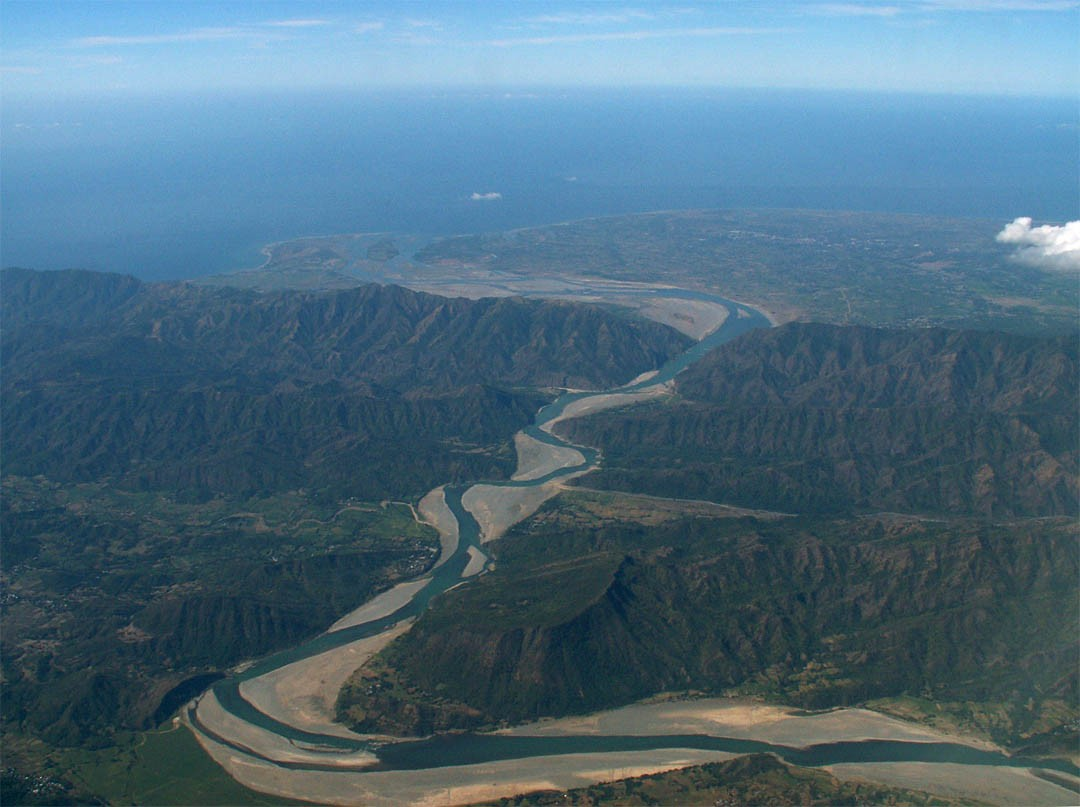
Banaoang Gap with Abra River

== Anecdotes of Angalo ==
=== Salt in the Sea ===
One day, Angalo asked his family to take bags with blocks of salt he harvested from distant lands to Manila. As they walked through the seas, which at the time were not salty, his daughters stumbled and their giant blocks of salt fell into the sea. The blocks of salt melted as they hit the water and created the saltiness of the sea.

=== Shallow Sea ===
On a very hot day, Angalo's daughters decided to swim in what is now the South China Sea. The sea was deep at this time, and his daughters did not know how to swim well. When one of his daughters began to drown, Angalo dipped the flap of his baag or loincloth into the sea and it absorbed so much water that his daughter was able to touch the sea floor again.

=== Hill of Suso Beach ===
One day, Angalo and his wife Aran were at the what is today called Suso Beach in Santa Maria, Ilocos Sur. While on the beach, Angalo piled up stones, land, shrubs, and sand to form a hill. When asked about his creation, he told his wife that he made the hill to resemble and honor her breasts. To this day, the hill on the southern side of Suso beach is said to be that hill.
