= Mrenh kongveal =

Legendary Khmer elves

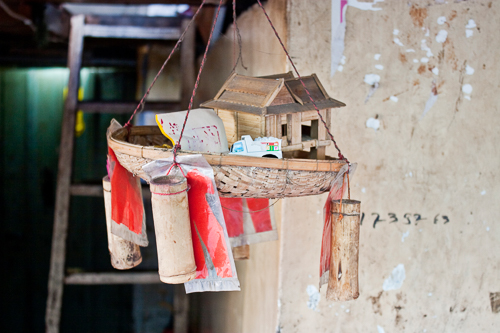
Mrenh kongveal spirit house in Cambodia

Mrenh kongveal (Khmer: ម្រេញគង្វាល, M’rénh Kóngvéal [mrɨɲ kuŋʋiəl]) are beings in Cambodian folk mythology resembling elves of western folklore; they are particularly associated with guarding animals. By anecdotal accounts the roots of Mrenh kongveal appear to be uniquely Khmer. The mrenh kongveal are small in stature with bodies comparable in size to human children, and are fond of mischief. Offerings are often left to them when seeking their help.

The etymology of the name given these spirits is not entirely evident in the component meanings. The Khmer word mrenh by itself is fishermen's slang for "one who catches fish" or, as a derivation from Sanskrit, "cancer". Kongveal means "herdsman", "guardian" or "keeper".

Originally they were perceived to be nomadic beings in the jungle, where they were the guardian herdsmen of wild animals, especially social animals that travel in herds, such as elephants. Hunters, farmers and mahouts (elephant trappers), would make baskets to leave offerings for mrenh kongveal, to bring luck in the hunt, to help them capture young elephants and buffalo, or to ward wild animals away from their crops. Today mrenh kongveal are thought of as akin to supernatural guardians, associated with a person, place, or institution. They protect or offer guidance to their benefactors, usually through telepathy (heard as whispers) or influencing dreams. They cannot be seen by adults but belief holds that they can make themselves appear to children between the ages of 6 and 14 who are "pure of heart", and many Cambodians claim to have seen mrenh kongveal as children.

== Romanization ==
There is no single accepted system of transliterating the Khmer alphabet. The spelling used is that most commonly found in Western scholarly work. Variants include m'ring kung veal, mereng kung veal, merang keng veal, mreñ ganval and mrén kongvial.
