= List of awards and nominations received by Janice de Belen =

Janice de Belen is a Filipino actress who has received numerous accolades for her work in film and television. She began her career as a child actress, known for her portrayal of the titular character in the soap opera Flordeluna (1979). She earned her first acting award in 1991 for Chito Roño's film Kailan Ka Magiging Akin. She has since appeared in a number of television series and films, earning her first FAMAS Award nomination in 1982 as "Best Child Actress" for her performance in Tropang Bulilit.

In 1990, she received the FAMAS and Gawad Urian for Best Actress nominations for her role in Rosenda (1989). In 2009, she won 'Best Actress' at the Young Critics Circle and another Best Actress award at the Gawad PASADO Awards the following year for her portrayal as a creamatory supervisor in the film Last Viewing, a role that also earned her 'Best Actress' nominations at the FAMAS and Gawad Urian Awards. In 2012, she starred in Jose Javier Reyes' drama film Mga Mumunting Lihim, winning' Best Actress' at the Cinemalaya Independent Film Festival. In 2016, she won 'Best Actress' at the World Premieres Film Festival and garnered nominations the following year at the FAMAS and PMPC Star Awards for Movies for the film Ringgo: The Dog Shooter. In 2023, de Belen won her first FAMAS Award for Best Supporting Actress in the black comedy film Big Night!. The film also earned her a PMPC Star Awards for Movies in the same category and nominations from Metro Manila Film Festival and the EDDYs.

As a TV personality, de Belen hosted several celebrity talk shows such as SiS (2001-10), Spoon (2007-15) and Showbiz Inside Report (2012-13). She began presenting the television talk show SiS with Gelli de Belen and Carmina Villaroel in 2001 and aired for over eight years. The show has won 'Best Celebrity Talk Show' at the Catholic Mass Media Awards and earned multiple nominations at the PMPC Star Awards for Television. In 2007, the noontime cooking and celebrity talk show Spoon premiered. She garnered six consecutive nominations for 'Best Celebrity Talk Show Host' at the PMPC Star Awards for Television, winning three. In 2013, she won a Golden Screen TV Awards for 'Outstanding Female Talk Program Host' for her work in the talk show Showbiz Inside Report. In 2010, de Belen received a star on the Eastwood City Walk of Fame for her contributions to Philippine film and television industry.

== Awards and nominations ==
Awards and nominations received by Janice de Belen
Award (Note: Awards, festivals, honors and other miscellaneous organizations are listed in alphabetical order.)	Year (Note: Indicates the year of ceremony. Each year is linked to the article about the awards held that year, wherever possible.)	Category	Nominated work	Result	Ref.
Box Office Entertainment Awards	2020	The General's Daughter casts	Best Acting Ensemble in a Drama Series	Won	
Catholic Mass Media Awards	2009	SiS	Best Celebrity Talk Show	Won	
Cinemalaya Independent Film Festival	2012	Mga Mumunting Lihim	Best Ensemble	Won	
Cinemalaya Independent Film Festival	2012	Mga Mumunting Lihim	Best Actress	Won	
EdukCircle Awards	2019	The General's Daughter	Best Supporting Actress in a TV series	Nominated	
FAMAS Awards	1982	Tropang Bulilit	Best Child Actress	Nominated	
FAMAS Awards	1990	Rosenda	Best Actress	Nominated	
FAMAS Awards	1991	Bakit kay Tagal ng Sandali?	Best Supporting Actress	Nominated	
FAMAS Awards	2010	Last Viewing	Best Actress	Nominated	
FAMAS Awards	2017	Ringgo: The Dog Shooter	Best Actress	Nominated	
FAMAS Awards	2022	Big Night!	Best Supporting Actress	Won	
Film Ambassadors' Night	2021	Sugat Sa Dugo	Film Ambassador	Won	
Gawad Pasado Awards	2010	Last Viewing	Best Actress	Won	
Gawad Tanglaw Awards	2013	Budoy	Best Performance by an Actress	Won	
Gawad Tanglaw Awards	2020	The General's Daughter	Best Actress in a Drama series	Won	
Gawad Urian Awards	1990	Rosenda	Best Actress	Nominated	
Gawad Urian Awards	1995	The Fatima Buen Story	Best Supporting Actress	Nominated	
Gawad Urian Awards	2010	Last Viewing	Best Actress	Nominated	
GEMS Awards	2018	Magpakailanman: The Blind Teacher	Best Actress in a Single Performance	Nominated	
Golden Screen Awards	2010	Mga Mumunting Lihim	Best Performance by an Actress in a Lead Role-Drama	Nominated	
Golden Screen Awards	2010	Tiktik: The Aswang Chronicles	Best Performance by an Actress in a Supporting Role-Drama, Musical or Comedy	Nominated	
Golden Screen TV Awards	2013	Showbiz Inside Report	Outstanding Female Talk Program Host	Won	
Golden Screen TV Awards	2013	Budoy	Outstanding Supporting Actress in a Drama Series	Nominated	
Golden Screen TV Awards	2013	Spoon	Outstanding Lifestyle Program Host	Nominated	
Golden Screen TV Awards	2014	Showbiz Inside Report	Outstanding Female Showbiz Talk Program Host	Nominated	
International Film Festival Manhattan (IFFM Autumn)	2021	Sugat Sa Dugo	Best Actress (tied with Jessica Chastain)	Won	
KBP Golden Dove Awards	2011	Janice	Best Magazine Program Host (Celebrity Talk Show Host)	Won	
KBP Golden Dove Awards	2013	Ina, Kapatid, Anak	Best Actress	Won	
Metro Manila Film Festival	2012	Shake, Rattle & Roll Fourteen: The Invasion	Best Actress	Nominated	
Metro Manila Film Festival	2012	The Strangers	Best Supporting Actress	Nominated	
Metro Manila Film Festival	2021	Big Night!	Best Supporting Actress	Nominated	
MTRCB TV Awards	2009	SiS	Best Celebrity Talk Show	Won	
PMPC Star Awards for Movies	1991	Bakit Kay Tagal	Movie Supporting Actress of the Year	Nominated	
PMPC Star Awards for Movies	2013	Tiktik: The Aswang Chronicles	Movie Supporting Actress of the Year	Won	
PMPC Star Awards for Movies	2017	Ringgo: The Dog Shooter	Movie Actress of the Year	Nominated	
PMPC Star Awards for Movies	2023	Big Night!	Movie Supporting Actress of the Year	Won	
PMPC Star Awards for Movies	2024	Sugat Sa Dugo	Movie Supporting Actress of the Year	Nominated	
PMPC Star Awards for Television	2006	SiS	Best Celebrity Talk Show	Nominated	
PMPC Star Awards for Television	2006	SiS	Best Celebrity Talk Show Host(s)	Nominated	
PMPC Star Awards for Television	2007	SiS	Best Celebrity Talk Show	Nominated	
PMPC Star Awards for Television	2007	SiS	Best Celebrity Talk Show Host(s)	Nominated	
PMPC Star Awards for Television	2008	SiS	Best Celebrity Talk Show	Nominated	
PMPC Star Awards for Television	2008	SiS	Best Celebrity Talk Show Host(s)	Nominated	
PMPC Star Awards for Television	2010	SiS	Best Celebrity Talk Show Host(s)	Nominated	
PMPC Star Awards for Television	2009	SiS	Best Celebrity Talk Show	Nominated	
PMPC Star Awards for Television	2009	SiS	Best Celebrity Talk Show Host(s)	Nominated	
PMPC Star Awards for Television	2009	Spoon	Best Celebrity Talk Show	Nominated	
PMPC Star Awards for Television	2009	Spoon	Best Celebrity Talk Show Host	Won	
PMPC Star Awards for Television	2010	Spoon	Best Celebrity Talk Show	Won	
PMPC Star Awards for Television	2010	Spoon	Best Celebrity Talk Show Host	Won	
PMPC Star Awards for Television	2011	Spoon	Best Celebrity Talk Show	Nominated	
PMPC Star Awards for Television	2011	Spoon	Best Celebrity Talk Show Host	Won	
PMPC Star Awards for Television	2012	Spoon	Best Showbiz Oriented/Celebrity Talk Show	Nominated	
PMPC Star Awards for Television	2012	Spoon	Best Female Showbiz Oriented/Celebrity Talk Show Host	Nominated	
PMPC Star Awards for Television	2013	Spoon	Best Celebrity Talk Show	Nominated	
PMPC Star Awards for Television	2013	Spoon	Best Celebrity Talk Show Host	Nominated	
PMPC Star Awards for Television	2013	Ina, Kapatid, Anak	Best Drama Actress	Nominated	
PMPC Star Awards for Television	2013	Showbiz Inside Report	Best Female Showbiz Oriented Talk Show Host	Nominated	
PMPC Star Awards for Television	2012	Budoy	Best Drama Actress	Nominated	
PMPC Star Awards for Television	2014	Ipaglaban Mo! episode: "Ang Lahat ng sa Akin	Best Single Performance by an Actress	Nominated	
PMPC Star Awards for Television	2014	Spoon	Best Celebrity Talk Show	Nominated	
PMPC Star Awards for Television	2014	Spoon	Best Celebrity Talk Show Host (s)	Nominated	
PMPC Star Awards for Television	2017	Magpakailanman: Ang Swerteng Hatid ng Pera sa Basura	Best Single Performance by an Actress	Nominated	
PMPC Star Awards for Television	2019	The General's Daughter	Best Drama Supporting Actress	Won	
PMPC Star Awards for Television	2019	Maalaala Mo Kaya: Medal of Valor	Best Single Performance by an Actress	Nominated	
PMPC Star Awards for Television	2020	Maalaala Mo Kaya: Mata	Best Single Performance by an Actress	Nominated	
PMPC Star Awards for Television	2023	La Vida Lena	Best Drama Supporting Actress	Nominated	
Sine Sandaan of Film Development Council of the Philippines (FDCP)	2019	Herself (with Aga Mulach)	Luminaries of Philippine Cinema (Loveteam category)	Won	
The EDDYs (Society of Philippine Entertainment Editors)	2022	Big Night!	Best Supporting Actress	Nominated	
World Premieres Film Festival	2016	Ringgo: The Dog Shooter	Best Actress	Won	
Young Critics Circle	2009	Last Viewing	Best Performance by Male or Female, Adult or Child, Individual or Ensemble in Leading or Supporting Role	Won	
