= Entertainment Live =

- Also known as: E-Live
- Genre: Entertainment, Talk show
- Directed by: Arnel Natividad
- Presented by: Toni Gonzaga; Luis Manzano; Mariel Rodriguez; Bianca Gonzales; Nikki Gil; Cesca Litton; K Brosas; Ogie Diaz
- Country of origin: Philippines
- Original languages: Filipino (primary); English (secondary)

Production
- Running time: 30 minutes
- Production company: ABS-CBN Studios

Original release
- Network: ABS-CBN
- Release: August 4, 2007 – January 28, 2012

Related
- Entertainment Konek (2005–2006); Showbiz Inside Report (2012–2013)

Entertainment Live (also known as E-Live) is a Philippine television talk show broadcast by ABS-CBN. Originally hosted by Toni Gonzaga, Mariel Rodriguez and Bianca Gonzalez, it aired on the network's Yes Weekend line up from August 4, 2007 to January 28, 2012, replaced by Showbiz Inside Report. Gonzalez, Luis Manzano, Nikki Gil and Ogie Diaz served as the final hosts.

== Cast ==
=== Main Hosts ===
- Bianca Gonzalez (2007–2010, 2011–2012)
- Luis Manzano (2008–2012)
- Nikki Gil (2010–2012)
- Ogie Diaz (2010–2012)

=== Guest Hosts ===
- Bianca Manalo (2011)
- Ginger Conejero (2011)
- Gretchen Fullido (2011)
- Angelica Panganiban (2011)
- Valerie Concepcion (2011)
- Vilma Santos (2011)

=== Former Hosts ===
- Toni Gonzaga (2007–2010; transferred to The Buzz)
- Mariel Rodriguez (2007–2010)
- Cesca Litton (2010)
- K Brosas (2011)

== Segments ==
=== OMG! ===
Hosted by the all host of Entertainment Live, this segment let the hosts of the show give their reactions, opinions and points of view.

=== Eguess mo ===
Hosted by Ogie Diaz for his blind item.

=== SixRets ===
Six questions to be asked on a guest by Luis Manzano

=== E-Live Inbox ===
The hosts reads the comments posted by the fans and televiewers.

=== Super Fans Day ===
Nikki Gil with a celebrity goes to a school and have a special and super cool fans day.

== Awards ==
- 2008, 2009, 2010 & 2011 PMPC Star Awards for TV "Best Showbiz-Oriented Talk Show" (Nominated)
- Toni Gonzaga won for "Best Female Showbiz-Oriented Talk Show Host" in 2009 PMPC Star Awards for TV.
- Bianca Gonzalez won for "Best Female Showbiz-Oriented Talk Show Host" in 2010 PMPC Star Awards for TV.
- Luis Manzano won for "Best Male Showbiz-Oriented Talk Show Host" in 2011 PMPC Star Awards for TV.

== Cancellation ==
E-live aired its final episode on January 28, 2012. Only Ogie Diaz was carried over to the new talk show Showbiz Inside Report which premiered on February 4, 2012, along with Carmina Villarroel, Janice de Belen and Joey Marquez. Luis Manzano focused on handling some shows including the hit game show Kapamilya, Deal or No Deal (seasons 4 and 5), Myx and Sarah G. Live, Bianca Gonzalez focused on hosting another showbiz news Cinema News on Cinema One, Pinoy Big Brother: Unlimited, and joined Umagang Kay Ganda while Nikki Gil focused on acting for Mundo Man ay Magunaw and handling both ASAP 2012 and Myx.

== See also ==
- List of programs broadcast by ABS-CBN
