= List of Lorenzo's Time episodes =

Lorenzo's Time is a 2012 Philippine melodrama television series starring Zaijian Jaranilla and Carmina Villarroel. The series aired on ABS-CBN's Primetime Bida evening block and worldwide on TFC from July 2 to October 5, 2012, replacing Dahil Sa Pag-ibig and was replaced by Ina, Kapatid, Anak.

== Series overview ==
| Year | Episode numbers | Episodes | First aired | Last aired |
|---|---|---|---|---|
| 2012 | 1–70 | 70 | July 2, 2012 | October 5, 2012 |

== Episodes ==
=== 2012 ===
| No. | Title | Original release date |
|---|---|---|
| 1 | "Pagsubok ng Panahon (Test of Time)" | July 2, 2012 |
| 2 | "Pagtulog sa Mahabang Panahon (Sleeping for Long Periods)" | July 3, 2012 |
| 3 | "Paggising sa Realidad (Awakening to Reality)" | July 4, 2012 |
| 4 | "Pamilyar na Mukha (Familiar Face)" | July 5, 2012 |
| 5 | "Plano ni Mildred (Mildred's Plan)" | July 6, 2012 |
| 6 | "Pakiramdam kay Katkat (Feeling like Katkat)" | July 9, 2012 |
| 7 | "Pagpapatunay ng Pagmamahal (Proof of Love)" | July 10, 2012 |
| 8 | "Pambihirang Kondisyon (Extraordinary Conditions)" | July 11, 2012 |
| 9 | "Tatay ni Charie (Charie's Father)" | July 12, 2012 |
| 10 | "Pagkikita ng Mag-ama (Father and Son Meeting)" | July 13, 2012 |
| 11 | "Panliligaw ni Lorenzo (Lorenzo's Courtship)" | July 14, 2012 |
| 12 | "Pagbabawal ni Bel kay Enzo (Bel's Regret to Enzo)" | July 17, 2012 |
| 13 | "Performance ng Anak (Daughter's Performance)" | July 18, 2012 |
| 14 | "Paghahanap ng Trabaho ni Jonas (Jonas' Job Search)" | July 19, 2012 |
| 15 | "Bel at Mildred (Bel and Mildred)" | July 20, 2012 |
| 16 | "Pagbitaw kay Katkat (Releasing Katkat)" | July 23, 2012 |
| 17 | "Pagtingin kay Katkat (Looking at Katkat)" | July 24, 2012 |
| 18 | "Pangarap ni Charie (Charie's Dream)" | July 25, 2012 |
| 19 | "Problema ng Kumpanya (Company Problem)" | July 26, 2012 |
| 20 | "Pagtago sa Madilim na Nakaraan (Hiding the Dark Past)" | July 27, 2012 |
| 21 | "Para sa mga Empleyado (For Employees)" | July 30, 2012 |
| 22 | "Misyon mula sa Ama (Mission from the Father)" | July 31, 2012 |
| 23 | "Aral ni Mildred kay Enzo (Mildred's Lesson to Enzo)" | August 1, 2012 |
| 24 | "Pwesto sa Kumpanya (Company Position)" | August 2, 2012 |
| 25 | "Bagong Kakampi (New Ally)" | August 3, 2012 |
| 26 | "Pagkuha sa Loob ni Enzo (Getting Inside Enzo)" | August 6, 2012 |
| 27 | "Pagtanggi sa Utos (Refusal of the Order)" | August 7, 2012 |
| 28 | "Pagpapalaya kay Ate Bel (Sister Bel's Release)" | August 8, 2012 |
| 29 | "Pangangalaga ni Mildred (Mildred's Care)" | August 9, 2012 |
| 30 | "Paghaharap sa Korte (Court Appearance)" | August 10, 2012 |
| 31 | "Pagtayo Bilang Testigo (Standing as a Witness)" | August 13, 2012 |
| 32 | "Pagkapanalo Bilang Kaso (Winning as a Case)" | August 14, 2012 |
| 33 | "Pagtataguyod Bilang Kumpanya (Corporate Promotion)" | August 15, 2012 |
| 34 | "Panibagong Hakbang ni Mildred (Mildred's New Step)" | August 16, 2012 |
| 35 | "Pag-Amin ni Kathy (Kathy's Confession)" | August 17, 2012 |
| 36 | "Pagmu-Move On ni Enzo, Part 1 (Enzo's Moving On, Part 1)" | August 20, 2012 |
| 37 | "Paghahanap Kay Archie (Searching for Archie)" | August 21, 2012 |
| 38 | "Paghahanap Kay Father William (Enzo Looks for Father William)" | August 22, 2012 |
| 39 | "Ala-ala ni Father William ukol kay Archie (Father William's memories of Archie)" | August 23, 2012 |
| 40 | "Pagmu-Move On ni Enzo, Part 2 (Enzo's Moving On, Part 2)" | August 24, 2012 |
| 41 | "Single Ulit si Kathy (Kathy is Single Again)" | August 27, 2012 |
| 42 | "Paga-Adjust sa Eskwela (Adjusting to School)" | August 28, 2012 |
| 43 | "Nakaraan ni Jonas (Jonas' Past)" | August 29, 2012 |
| 44 | "Natunton ni Mildred si Archie (Mildred tracks down Archie)" | August 30, 2012 |
| 45 | "Katotohanan Tungkol Kay Archie (Facts About Archie)" | August 31, 2012 |
| 46 | "Mildred Pagma-manipula kay Jonas (Manipulating Jonas)" | September 3, 2012 |
| 47 | "Suporta ni Jonas (Jonas' Support)" | September 4, 2012 |
| 48 | "Paghihiwalay nina Enzo at Jonas (Enzo and Jonas' Separation)" | September 5, 2012 |
| 49 | "Pangungumbinsi ni Jonas (Jonas' Persuasion)" | September 6, 2012 |
| 50 | "Natitirang Oras (Time Remaining)" | September 7, 2012 |
| 51 | "Plano ni Mildred kay Kathy (Mildred's Plan for Kathy)" | September 10, 2012 |
| 52 | "Katapatan ng Tunay na Pag-ibig (Loyalty of True Love)" | September 11, 2012 |
| 53 | "Paninisi ni Jonas (Jonas' Redemption)" | September 12, 2012 |
| 54 | "Hindi Susukuan ni Jonas (Jonas Won't Give Up)" | September 13, 2012 |
| 55 | "Awayang Jonas at Enzo (Call Jonas and Enzo)" | September 14, 2012 |
| 56 | "Pagsasabong ni Mildred (Mildred's Pregnancy)" | September 17, 2012 |
| 57 | "Karapatan Bilang Montereal (Right as Montereal)" | September 18, 2012 |
| 58 | "Kahinaan ni Jonas (Jonas' Weakness)" | September 19, 2012 |
| 59 | "Simula ng Bagong Buhay (Beginning of a New Life)" | September 20, 2012 |
| 60 | "Nauubos ang Oras (Time is Running Out)" | September 21, 2012 |
| 61 | "Pag-iimbestiga sa Kidnapping (Kidnapping Investigation)" | September 24, 2012 |
| 62 | "Si Archie Kay Jonas (Archie to Jonas)" | September 25, 2012 |
| 63 | "Pagtutulungan nina Enzo at Jonas (Enzo and Jonas' Collaboration)" | September 26, 2012 |
| 64 | "Anak ng Kanilang Ama (Their Father's Son)" | September 27, 2012 |
| 65 | "Katotohanan sa Kamatayan ni Manuel Montereal (Truth on the Death of Manuel Montereal)" | September 28, 2012 |
| 66 | "Katotohanan Mula Kay Tito Badong (Truth from Tito Badong)" | October 1, 2012 |
| 67 | "Proteksyon ni Vincent kay Mildred (Vincent's Protection of Mildred)" | October 2, 2012 |
| 68 | "Galit sa kabila ng Kahinaan (Anger Despite Weakness)" | October 3, 2012 |
| 69 | "Malaking Rebelasyon (Great Revelation)" | October 4, 2012 |
| 70 | "Ang Walang-Kupas na Katapusan (The Timeless Finale)" | October 5, 2012 |
