= The Refrigerator (film) =

- VHS cover.
- Directed by: Nicholas Jacobs
- Written by: Nicholas Jacobs
- Story by: Christopher Oldcorn; Nicholas Jacobs; Philip Dolin
- Produced by: Christopher Oldcorn
- Starring: Julia McNeal; Bella Sana; Dave Simonds; Angel Caban
- Cinematography: Paul Gibson
- Edited by: P.J. Pesce; Nicholas Jacobs; Suzanne Pillsbury; Christopher Oldcorn
- Music by: Adam Roth; Don Peterkofsky; Christopher Burke
- Production companies: Avenue D Films; Connexion Film Productions
- Release date: June 1991 (Germany)
- Running time: 86 minutes
- Country: United States
- Language: English
- Budget: $500,000 (estimated)

The Refrigerator is a 1991 supernatural comedy horror film starring Julia McNeal, Dave Simonds and Angel Caban. It was written and directed by Nicholas Jacobs. The film tells the story about a couple that moved into an apartment in New York with a refrigerator that contains the portal to Hell.

== Background ==
The first draft of the script was written in 1987 and the film took four years altogether to make. The Refrigerator was filmed within New York in America, by production companies Connexion Film Productions and Avenue D Films. As an independent production with a limited budget, the filmmakers decided not to get the film rated by the MPAA and as a result it was released straight to video and promptly disappeared.

It was first seen in Germany at the June 1991 Munich Film Festival. On 25 September 1992, it premiered in New York and during 1993 it had a theatrical release across Germany via Impuls-Film Hans-Joachim Flebbe Co. The film was released on VHS in Germany via Warner Home Video on 25 February 1993. Later in the UK, on 10 July 1995, it had a limited release on VHS via the studio Mia (Missing in Action). In America, the film had a very limited video release in 1993 via Monarch Home Video. It has never seen an official DVD release.

The film is similar to the Filipino horror film Shake Rattle and Roll's episode: Pridyider, which was also remade in 2012, also known as Fridge.

== Plot ==
The film opens with a couple drunk driving through the streets of New York. Upon arriving at their apartment, they make love in front of the kitchen. Afterwards, the wife walks into the kitchen whereupon the refrigerator opens up and sucks her in.

Steve & Eileen Bateman move to New York, renting the apartment with the killer refrigerator. Steve takes a new job, while Eileen dreams of becoming a performer. She pretends to receive an award then walks all over Broadway.

Steve, Nanny and Eileen begin to have nightmares about the refrigerator: Steve sees mini people inside the refrigerator (supposed victims) while Eileen sees unborn babies.

Steve is slowly driven to insanity by the refrigerator's influence, leaving Eileen to cope with her acting career on her own.

Juan, a plumber, comes to the apartment one night, warning Eileen that her refrigerator is from Hell and the devil controls it.

Steve, Nanny and Eileen throw a party at their apartment one night. The refrigerator brings the other kitchen appliances to life and begins slaughtering the guests. Juan ties the refrigerator shut, and the surviving guests flee. Later, another couple is shown interested in buying the apartment.

== Cast ==
- Julia McNeal - Eileen Bateman
- Bella Sana - Nanny Bateman
- Dave Simonds - Steve Bateman
- Phyllis Sanz - Tanya
- Angel Caban - Juan
- Nena Segal - Eileen's Mother
- Jaime Rojo - Paolo
- Alex Trisano - Hector
- Peter Justinus - Mr. Walters
- Karen Wexler - Nikki
- Michael Beltran - Ramon
- Jack Mason - Chipper
- Larry Tate - Mr. Jarvis
- Phil Butard - Bob
- Michelle DeCosta - Young Eileen Bateman
- Anthony McGowen - Pete Jackson

== Critical reception ==
TV Guide gave the film two out of four stars, and stated "The Refrigerator is billed as a supernatural horror comedy which ultimately is its downfall - too many chickens in the pot. First-time director Nicholas Jacobs's juxtaposition of genres is compelling in thought, but unfortunately on film the results just don't measure up. While the basic premise of The Refrigerator - take a couple of dream yuppies and plop them into a world of madness and horror - is satirical and wry, the final results aren't very satisfying. The main failure of the film is that none of the separate entities work on their own - the funny scenes generally aren't funny and the scary parts, while original in idea, aren't scary, only overly gory. On top of this, Jacobs throws in a couple of ultraserious segments involving the mother-daughter relationship that are completely out of place. Mueller and Simonds as the jinxed couple offer up the right amount of exuberance and angst. Caban, though, as the plumber who looks more like an urban commando, best fits his role. Jacobs's eclectic use of music, from campy to melodramatic, is one of the highlights of the film. If he had put a little more punch in his screenplay, been more daring with his satire and put some real scares in the film, the end result would have made a lot more sense. Maybe his intentions weren't to make us laugh or get chills down our spine - it's a parody, after all. Perhaps he just wanted to make a statement about the inherent evil of domesticity. If so, it could have been done many other ways."
