= Christian Vasquez =

Filipino actor and model

Christian Vazquez
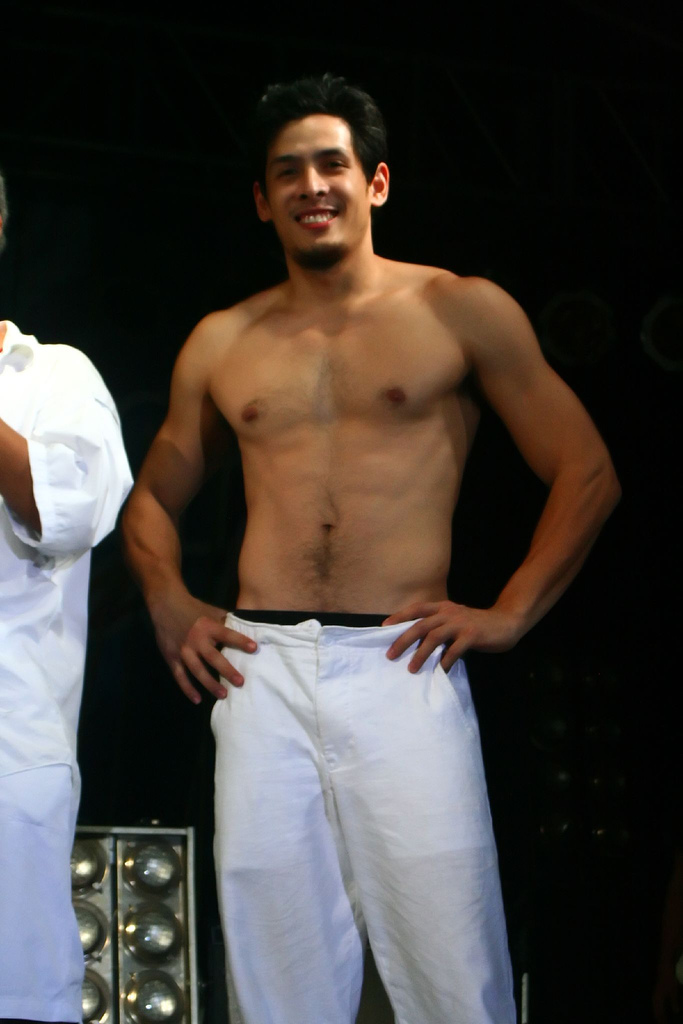
- Vazquez in 2006
- Born: Christian Oliver B. Vazquez; Bacolod, Philippines
- Occupations: Model, television/film actor
- Years active: 2001–present
- Height: 1.83 m (6 ft 0 in)
- Children: 3

Christian Oliver B. Vazquez is a Filipino actor, model and a former housemate of ABS-CBN's Pinoy Big Brother: Celebrity Edition 1. During his stint at Pinoy Big Brother, he was one of the comedian housemates. He graduated from high school at the University of St. La Salle-Integrated School Batch 1994 in Bacolod City.

An Ilonggo, Vazquez gained popularity for his PLDT and Trosyd Lotion commercial in which a father who lives in Iloilo forced his son who studies in Manila to take up medicine instead of fine arts. Against his father's will, he took up fine arts instead and finally his father accepted his son's decision. The line of the commercial which is a mixture of Ilonggo and Tagalog, Kung saan ka masaya te suportahan ta ka ("I will support you, wherever you are gonna be happy with") made him popular.

On March 4, 2006, Vazquez became the second housemate to be officially evicted from the Pinoy Big Brother house and the fourth housemate to leave the house. He received 13.5% of the people's vote, so far the lowest among that edition's evictees.

== Personal life ==
Vasquez has two children from a previous marriage and a daughter named Christienne Aubrielle.

== Filmography ==
=== Film ===
Year	Title	Role
2001	Pagdating ng Panahon	Joaquin
2002	Jologs	Joan's boyfriend
2002	9 Mornings	Leo
2003	Sukdulan	Miguel's buddy
2003	Liberated	Tony
2003	Bridal Shower	Mickey
2004	Liberated 2	Washington
2004	Minsan Pa	Alex
2006	I Wanna Be Happy	George
2006	Manay Po	Gerry
2006	ZsaZsa Zaturnnah Ze Moveeh	Mang Justin
2007	Pain Things	
2007	Apat Dapat, Dapat Apat: Friends 4 Lyf and Death	Braulio
2008	Manay Po 2: Overload	Gerry
2008	Sisa	Juanito
2008	Namets!	Jacko Teves
2008	Desperadas 2	Congressman Fely
2010	Si Techie, si Teknoboy, at Si Juana B	
2011	Paglipad ng Anghel	
2012	Sisterakas	The policeman
2013	Momzillas	Love of Clara and Minerva
2013	Pedro Calungsod: Batang Martir	Diego Luis de San Vitores
2014	Sa Ngalan ng Ama, Ina at mga Anak	Ongkoy's Assassin 2
2015	Felix Manalo	Avelina's husband
2016	My Virtual Hero	
2018	The Trigonal: Fight for Justice	Allen
2019	Between Maybes	Jerry (Hazel's father)
2019	The Fate	Daddy Allan
2020	Suarez: The Healing Priest	Ilin Priest
2022	The Buy Bust Queen	Fernando Baltazar
2023	Voltes V: Legacy – The Cinematic Experience	Emperor Zu Zambojil
2024	Road Trip	Edmund
2025	The Delivery Rider	Joel Velasquez
TBA	Kuya: The Governor Edwin Jubahib Story	Manny Villar

=== Television ===
Year	Title	Role	Notes
2001	Sa Dulo ng Walang Hanggan	Matthew Monteclaro	
2002	OK Fine, 'To Ang Gusto Nyo!	Rocky	
2002 – 2003	Kahit Kailan	Carlo	
2004 – 2005	Hiram	Louie Diaz	
2005 – 2006	Sugo	Karuma	
2006	Pinoy Big Brother: Celebrity Edition	Himself - Housemate	Cast Member
2006	Komiks Presents: Da Adventures of Pedro Penduko	Haring Bagul	
2007	Ysabella	Young Norman	
2007 – 2009	Camera Café	Sylvio	
2008	Palos	Young General Vittorio Canavarro	
2008	Lobo	Young General Leon Cristobal	
2008	I Love Betty La Fea	Young Roberto Solis	
2008 – 2009	Luna Mystika	Milawon	
2008 – 2010	Everybody Hapi	Michael	
2009 – 2010	Dahil May Isang Ikaw	Ed Aragon	
2010	Habang May Buhay	Attorney Rodrigo	
2010	Magkaribal	Paul	
2010	Precious Hearts Romances Presents: Martha Cecilia's Kristine	Romano Fortalejo	
2010	Imortal	Badong / Luis Cristobal	
2010	Kung Tayo'y Magkakalayo	Young Rustico Crisanto / Supremo	
2010	Kokey @ Ako	Roland Reyes	
2011	Babaeng Hampaslupa	William Wong	
2011 – 2012	Maria la del Barrio	Manuel Hernandez	
2011 – 2012	Budoy	Dr. Isaac Maniego	
2012	Princess and I	Dasho Kencho Rinpoche	
2012	Lorenzo's Time	Mike	
2012 – 2013	Ina, Kapatid, Anak	Antonio Lagdameo, Sr.	
2013	Apoy sa Dagat	Young Manolo Lamayre	
2013	Carlo J. Caparas' Dugong Buhay	Enrique de Lara	
2014	Beki Boxer	Max	
2014	Sana Bukas pa ang Kahapon	Young Henry Buenavista	
2014	Ipaglaban Mo!	Romy Castro	Episode: "Love Ko si Sir"
2015	Ricky Lee's Nasaan Ka Nang Kailangan Kita	Leandro Natividad	
2015	Ipaglaban Mo!	Atty. Roger Tuazon	Episode: "Mapagsamantalang Amo"
2015 – 2016	Princess in the Palace	Colonel Oliver Gonzaga	
2016	Ipaglaban Mo!	Principal Manrique	Episode: "Mapusok"
2016	The Ryzza Mae Show's Calle Siete	Mark Sebastian	
2016	FPJ's Ang Probinsyano (season 2)	Benedicto Vergel	
2017	Ipaglaban Mo!	Julio	Episode: "Buy-bust"
2017 – 2018	Wildflower	Atty. Dante Cruz	
2017 – 2018	Wildflower	Damian "Jaguar" Cruz	
2017	Ipaglaban Mo!	Jake's father	Episode: "Dukot"
2018	Asintado	Eric Salazar	
2018	Bagani	Dakim	
2018 – 2019	Ngayon at Kailanman	Hernan Cortes	
2019	Magpakailanman	Manny Villar	Episode: "Tatlong Henerasyon ng Sipag at Tiyaga"
2019	Ipaglaban Mo!	Ruben	Episode: "Sabik"
2019 – 2020	The Gift	Javier Marcelino	
2020 – 2022	La Vida Lena	Conrad Suarez	
2021	FPJ's Ang Probinsyano (season 8)	Atty. Fernando Mante	
2022	Widows' Web	Boris Tayuman	
2023	Underage	Dominic Gatchalian	
2023	Voltes V: Legacy	Emperor Zu Zambojil	
2023	The Iron Heart	Orcus Silverio	
2023	Tadhana	Roman	Episode: Pagtakas sa Kahapon
2023 – 2024	Lovers & Liars	Victor Tamayo	
2024	Walang Matigas na Pulis sa Matinik na Misis	Estong	Season 2 guest
2024	Padyak Princess	Ka Ernie dela Cruz	
2024	FPJ's Batang Quiapo	PCol. Samuel Ilagan	
2024	How to Spot a Red Flag	Leandro Valdez	
2025	It's Okay to Not Be Okay	Alex Roces	Episodes: Destiny Finds Us and Shared Past
2025	I Love You Since 1892	Don Alejandro Montecarlos	
2026	Roja	Homer Sebastian	
2026	The Secrets of Hotel 88	Sandro Soliman	
2026	Born to Shine	Freddie Grande	
