= Namets! =

- Theatrical poster
- Directed by: Jay Abello
- Written by: Vicente Garcia Groyon
- Produced by: Vicente Garcia Groyon; Fiona Borres; Marya Ignacio; Tara Illenberger
- Starring: Christian Vasquez; Angel Jacob; Peque Gallaga; Dwight Gaston; Monsour del Rosario
- Cinematography: Anne Monzon
- Edited by: Fiona Borres
- Music by: Vince de Jesus
- Distributed by: Videoflick Productions
- Release date: July 11, 2008 (Cinemalaya)
- Running time: 90 minutes
- Country: Philippines
- Languages: Hiligaynon; English
- Budget: less than Php 1 million

Namets! is a 2008 Philippine independent film directed by Jay Abello. The film was a finalist in the full-length feature category of the 2008 Cinemalaya Philippine Independent Film Festival. The film's title is a play on the Hiligaynon word namit, which means "yummy" or "delicious".

== Plot ==
Jacko Teves (Christian Vasquez) owns Puccini's, an Italian restaurant in Bacolod. When a monstrous cock fighting debt sets him at odds with Boss Dolpo (Peque Gallaga), he offers his restaurant up as payment. Boss Dolpo brings in Cassie Labayen (Angel Jacob) as a consultant to renovate the restaurant. Much to Jacko's dismay, Cassie decides to offer Negrense cuisine instead of Italian. The pair then set off across the province re-discovering the unique aspects of Negrense food.

== Cast ==
- Jacko Teves: Christian Vasquez
- Cassie Labayen: Angel Jacob
- Boss Dolpo: Peque Gallaga
- Oscar: Dwight Gaston
- Rodrigo Labayen: Louie Zabaljauregui
- Imelda Teves: Michelle Gallaga
- Nena Teves: Marivic Lacson
- Babyboy Labayen: Monsour del Rosario
- Farmer: Ronnie Lazaro
- Caveman: Joel Torre

=== Production ===
The film was shot on location entirely in the province of Negros Occidental. Locales included Isabela, Sagay City, Silay City and Bacolod. Seventy percent of the cast and crew were locally sourced talent and the dialogue is in Hiligaynon with English subtitles.
