= Maruja (character) =

Filipino comic book character

Publication information
- Created by: Mars Ravelo

In-story information
- Alter ego: Maruja Isabella Sevilla (Spanish Era); Nina Concepcion/Cristy (Reincarnation)
- Species: Human
- Abilities: Extrasensory perception

Maruja is a Filipino comic book character created by Mars Ravelo. The eponymously-titled comic book is an immortal love story about two people whose love for each other transcends a century. Written by Ravelo and illustrated by Rico Rival, the story deals with reincarnation, beginning with the ill-fated love story of Maruja and Gabriel during the Spanish era and ending with their reunion one hundred years later.

== In the comic book ==
=== Synopsis ===
Maruja and Gabriel were madly in love with each other during the Spanish era, but Maruja's parents disapproved of their relationship because of their class difference. Maruja was forced to marry Rodrigo, the captain of the civil guards, to ensure their fortune. But right after the marriage, the same night, she took her own life with a promise to Gabriel that they would be reunited someday. One hundred years later, Maruja is reincarnated as Cristy. She sees flashes from the past, memories that are not hers. She connects all the pieces together and is finally reunited with an aged and dying Gabriel.

==== Collected editions of the comic book ====
Title	Volume	Issue	Date
Maruja	Pilipino Komiks Magasin (1965-1966)	#2	March 3, 1966
Maruja	Pilipino Komiks Magasin (1965-1966)	#488	May 25, 1967

== In other media ==
=== Films ===
- Maruja, the 1967 film, starred Susan Roces with Romeo Vasquez. Roces played both Nina Concepcion and Maruja.
- The 1978 remake Gumising Ka Maruja was a suspense thriller. It starred Phillip Salvador, as Gabriel, and Susan Roces, who reprised the title role.
- Maruja, the 1996 remake, starred Carmina Villarroel as Maruja and Rustom Padilla (now known as BB Gandanghari) as Gabriel.

=== Television ===
- The 2009 television series Komiks Presents: Nasaan Ka Maruja? starred Kristine Hermosa as Maruja. The series was supposed to be Sheryl Cruz's comeback, but due to her transfer to another network she was replaced by Hermosa.
