= Kadenang Kristal =

Philippine television drama series

- Also known as: Crystal Chain
- Genre: Drama
- Developed by: Gina Marissa Tagasa
- Directed by: Gina Alajar
- Starring: Amy Austria; Maricel Laxa; Rio Locsin; Jackie Lou Blanco; Teresa Loyzaga
- Theme music composer: Joey de Leon; Vic Sotto
- Opening theme: "Kadenang Kristal" by Aiza Seguerra
- Country of origin: Philippines
- Original language: Tagalog
- No. of episodes: 268

Production
- Executive producers: Malou Choa-Fagar; Joel Jimenez
- Camera setup: Multiple-camera setup
- Running time: 30 minutes
- Production company: TAPE Inc.

Original release
- Network: GMA Network
- Release: July 31, 1995 – August 9, 1996

Kadenang Kristal (trans. / international title: Crystal Chain) is a Philippine television drama series broadcast by GMA Network. Directed by Gina Alajar, it stars Amy Austria, Maricel Laxa, Rio Locsin, Jackie Lou Blanco and Teresa Loyzaga. It premiered on July 31, 1995. The series concluded on August 9, 1996, with a total of 268 episodes.

== Cast and characters ==
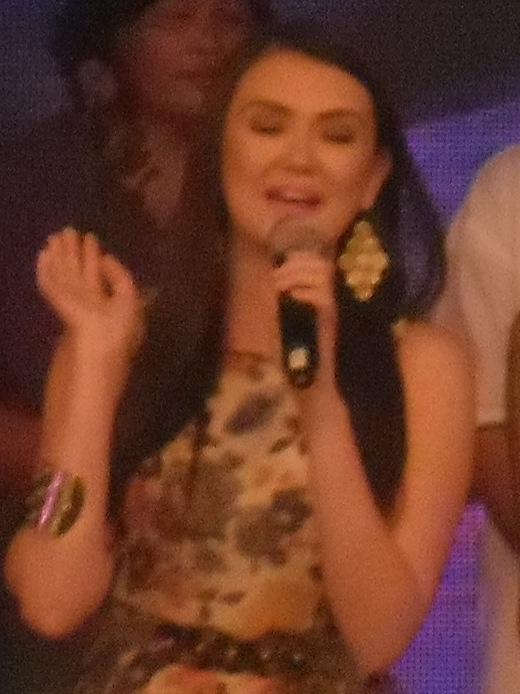
Angelica Panganiban portrays Mariella.

Lead cast

- Amy Austria as Kristal
- Jackie Lou Blanco as Elizabeth
- Maricel Laxa as Aileen
- Rio Locsin as Lolita
- Teresa Loyzaga as Teresita "Sita"

Supporting cast

- Angelica Panganiban as Mariella
- Lady Lee as Anya
- Patricia Ann Roque as Nadia
- Karina "Kara" Cruz as Luisa
- Sarah Jane Abad as Ruth
- Luz Valdez as Amelia
- Ernie Garcia
- Tanya Gomez
- Roy Alvarez
- Julie Fe Navarro
- Janus del Prado
- Jefferson Long

== Accolades ==
Accolades received by Kadenang Kristal
Year	Award	Category	Recipient	Result	Ref.
1996	10th PMPC Star Awards for Television	Best Drama Serial	Kadenang Kristal	Nominated	
