= Road Trip (2024 film) =

2024 Philippine film

- Theatrical release poster
- Directed by: Andoy Ranay
- Screenplay by: Candy Pangilinan
- Story by: Candy Pangilinan
- Produced by: Veronique Del Rosario-Corpus; Vincent Del Rosario III
- Starring: Janice de Belen; Gelli de Belen; Carmina Villarroel; Candy Pangilinan
- Cinematography: Joshua Reyles
- Edited by: Tara Illenberger
- Music by: Jose Buencamino
- Production company: Viva Films
- Distributed by: Viva Films
- Release dates: January 17, 2024 (theatrical release); May 14, 2024 (Netflix)
- Running time: 108 minutes
- Country: Philippines
- Language: Filipino

Road Trip (stylized as RoadTrip) is a 2024 Philippine comedy road movie written by Candy Pangilinan and directed by Andoy Ranay. It stars Janice de Belen, Gelli de Belen, Carmina Villarroel and Candy Pangilinan. The film is about four friends having a road trip to visit the wake of a friend.

The film was released in Netflix on May 14, 2024, and it debuted at the number 1 spot on Netflix's top 10 movies in the Philippines.

== Plot ==
The film follows four lifelong friends, Gigi (Janice de Belen), Maricar (Gelli de Belen), Chiqui (Carmina Villarroel), and Sophia (Candy Pangilinan) who reunite after years apart to fulfill a dream they shared in their youth to embark on a journey to Mount Pulag. Their reunion is prompted by the death of their friend Gigi, whose passing serves as a catalyst for the group's long-overdue adventure.

As they traverse the scenic landscapes of the Philippines, the women confront unresolved issues from their pasts. Each character brings her own set of personal struggles to the journey.

Throughout their journey, the friends encounter various challenges that test their bond. They engage in heartfelt conversations, confront past grievances, and rediscover the strength of their friendship. The road trip becomes a transformative experience, allowing each woman to reflect on her life choices and the paths not taken.

As they ascend Mount Pulag, the highest peak in Luzon, the physical climb mirrors their emotional journey. The mountain serves as a metaphor for the obstacles they've faced and the personal growth they've achieved. The breathtaking vistas and serene environment provide a backdrop for moments of introspection and reconciliation.

== Cast ==
- Janice de Belen as Gigi, A writer known for her kindness and selflessness, Gigi has always been the glue holding the group together. However, her untimely death reveals the emotional burdens she carried silently.
  - Abby Bautista as Young Gigi
- Gelli de Belen as Maricar, An events planner who often avoids expressing her true feelings, Maricar grapples with the consequences of her emotional detachment and the impact it has had on her relationships.
  - Ashtine Olviga as Young Maricar
- Carmina Villarroel as Chiqui, An actress married to a politician, Chiqui appears to lead a glamorous life but struggles with the lack of autonomy, as her decisions are heavily influenced by her parents and societal expectations.
  - Heart Ryan as Young Chiqui
- Candy Pangilinan as Sophia, A businesswoman managing a construction firm and dabbling in vlogging, Sophia comes across as bossy but is always ready to lend a hand.
  - Yumi Garcia as Young Sophia
- John Lapus as Michael
- JC Tiuseco as Gabriel
- Christian Vasquez as Edmund
- Ana Abad Santos as Frances
  - Jastine Lim as Young Frances
- Paolo O'Hara as Enzo
  - Ethan David as Young Enzo
- Maricar Dela Fuente as Maria

== Production ==
The cast started filming on September 25, 2023.

== Release and reception ==
The film was released on January 17, 2024, under Viva Films.

The movie received a score of 66/100 from 8 reviews according to review aggregator website Kritikultura, indicating generally positive reviews.
