= Lorenzo's Time =

2012 Philippine television series

- Title card
- Genre: Drama
- Created by: ABS-CBN Studios
- Written by: Dindo Perez; Shugo Praico; Richard Reynante; John Joseph Tuason
- Directed by: Jerome C. Pobocan; Claudio "Tots" Sanchez-Mariscal IV
- Starring: Zaijian Jaranilla; Carmina Villarroel
- Opening theme: "Times of Your Life" by Martin Nievera
- Composers: Roger Nichols; Bill Lane
- Country of origin: Philippines
- Original languages: Filipino; English
- No. of episodes: 70 (list of episodes)

Production
- Executive producers: Roldeo T. Endrinal; Maya Manuel-Aralar
- Cinematography: Roland Besa; Bobby Pintor
- Running time: 30–45 minutes Monday – Friday at 21:15 (PST)
- Production company: Dreamscape Entertainment Television

Original release
- Network: ABS-CBN
- Release: July 2 – October 5, 2012

Lorenzo's Time is a 2012 Philippine television drama series broadcast by ABS-CBN. Directed by Jerome C. Pobocan and Claudio "Tots" Sanchez-Mariscal IV, it stars Zaijian Jaranilla and Carmina Villarroel. It aired on the network's Primetime Bida line up and worldwide on TFC from July 2 to October 5, 2012, replacing Dahil sa Pag-ibig and was replaced by Ina, Kapatid, Anak.

This series was streaming on Jeepney TV.

== Overview ==
Year	Episode numbers	Episodes	First aired	Last aired
2012	1–70	70	July 2, 2012	October 5, 2012

== Premise ==
Lorenzo's Time is a story about a young boy named Lorenzo (Zaijian Jaranilla) who was diagnosed with progeria, an extremely rare genetic condition wherein symptoms resembling aspects of aging are manifested at an early age. In order to preserve his young body, he was subjected to cryonics until his parents find a cure for it. After 30 years, Enzo woke up to a world where he missed precious moments of his life, including his family and the only girl he loves.

== Cast and characters ==
=== Main cast ===
- Zaijian Jaranilla as Lorenzo "Enzo" Montereal
- Carmina Villarroel as Kathy "Kat-Kat" Gonzales-Montereal

=== Supporting cast ===
- Amy Austria-Ventura as Mildred Montereal-Gamboa
- Gina Pareño as Bella "Ate Belle" Nobleza
- James Blanco as Jonas Silvestre / Archimedes "Archie" Montereal II
- Alfred Vargas as Dr. Carlo Ramirez
- Belle Mariano as Charity "Charie" Gonzales Montereal / young Kat-Kat Gonzales
- Joel Torre as Salvador "Badong" Gamboa
- Rommel Padilla as Vincent Castillo

=== Recurring cast ===
- John Estrada as young Manuel Montereal
- Kaye Abad as young Mildred Montereal-Gamboa
- Tess Antonio as Sheryl Santiago
- Vino Martinez as Alfonso "Ali" Gamboa
- Cacai Bautista as Kikay

=== Guest cast ===
- Isay Alvarez as Atty. Rachel Medina
- Emilio Garcia as Henry Rivera
- Spanky Manikan as Luis Robles
- Jojo Alejar as Atty. Patrick Dominguez
- Joonee Gamboa as Fr. William Ramos
- Gerald Pesigan as Herbert Flores
- Nina Ricci Alagao as Natasha Magallanes

=== Special participation ===
- Tirso Cruz III as Manuel Montereal/ Mang Jose Nobleza
- Dimples Romana as Susan Montereal
- Eric Fructuoso as young Badong Gamboa
- Jannica Pareño as young Bella Nobleza
- John Wayne Sace as young Vincent Castillo
- Rain Quite as young Archie Montereal II
- Christian Vasquez as Dr. Mike Ramirez

=== Cameo appearances ===
- 6cyclemind
- Rico J. Puno
- Jinggoy Estrada

== Production ==
The series was announced on February 20, 2012. It was originally called as Frozen Boy before changing to its final title Lorenzo's Time. Production and taping or principal photography of the series was done for 8 months from February 20 to October 5, 2012.

=== Reception ===
Lorenzo's Time became an instant hit beating its competitor with 26.4% ratings share in Mega Manila according to the AGB Nielsen data and it posted an average of 29.2% ratings share nationwide according to the Kantar Media-TNS data. It became a trending topic worldwide and nationwide on its pilot episode with the audience and critics praising the show for its high concept and creativity.

=== Music ===
Music plays an important part in Lorenzo's Time to express the drama's emotional, comedic and romantic sequences. The soundtrack is led by its first single, Times of Your Life by Martin Nievera.

Lorenzo's Time: The Official Soundtrack

Soundtrack album by Various artists
- Released: 2012
- Genres: OPM, Pop
- Label: Star Music
- Producer: ABS-CBN Film Productions, Inc.

Part 1:
No.	Title	Artist	Length
1.	"Times of Your Life"	Martin Nievera	3:43

Part 2:
No.	Title	Artist	Length
1.	"Kahit Maputi Na Ang Buhok Ko"	Nyoy Volante	3:25

Part 3:
No.	Title	Artist	Length
1.	"Walang Kapalit"	Piolo Pascual

== Promotion ==
This show has been developed by Mga Anghel na Walang Langit, Princess Sarah, May Bukas Pa, Agua Bendita, Momay, Noah, Mutya, 100 Days to Heaven, Budoy, Ikaw ay Pag-Ibig, and Dahil sa Pag-ibig, due to genre of family and religious-oriented drama series where Dreamscape Entertainment released these types of series since 2005. It was succeeded by Juan dela Cruz.

== Accolades ==
=== Awards and nominations ===
Year	Awarded for/Category	Recipient(s)	Work	Result	Ref
2013	27th PMPC Star Awards for TV	Best Child Performer	Zaijian Jaranilla	Lorenzo's Time	Nominated
2013	27th PMPC Star Awards for TV	Best Drama Supporting Actress	Amy Austria	Lorenzo's Time	Nominated

== See also ==
- List of programs broadcast by ABS-CBN
- List of ABS-CBN Studios original drama series
