= Janice de Belen =

Filipino actress (born 1968)

- Born: Catherine Janice Yap de Belen; November 9, 1968 (age 57); Manila, Philippines
- Occupations: Actress; model; television host
- Years active: 1978–present
- Spouse: John Estrada (m. 1992; ann. 2004)
- Children: 5, including Kaila
- Relatives: Gelli de Belen (sister); Ariel Rivera (brother-in-law)
- Awards: Full list

YouTube information
- Channel: Super Janice De Belen
- Years active: 2020–present
- Genres: Cooking; Arts&Crafts; Actress
- Subscribers: 252 thousand
- Views: 10.1 million
- Last updated: August 1st, 2026

Catherine Janice Yap de Belen (born November 9, 1968), known as Janice de Belen (Tagalog: [dʒɐˈnis dɛ bɛˈlɛn]), is a Filipino actress. Philippine media has dubbed her as the "Queen of Horror-Drama" for her acting and portrayals in both Filipino drama and horror films.

She began her career in show business as a child star, and her breakthrough came when she played the title role in the soap opera Flordeluna (1979–1984). She was hailed by Philippine media as the "80s Teen Drama Princess" alongside her then-rival in show business, Julie Vega.

De Belen is a FAMAS Award winner (including three Best Actress nominations). In 2020, she won Best Actress in a Drama Series alongside Angel Locsin, Maricel Soriano and Eula Valdez at the 18th Gawad Tanglaw Awards. The same year, she also won Best Drama Supporting Actress at the 33rd PMPC Star Awards for Television. In 2022, she won Best Supporting Actress at the 70th FAMAS Awards for her performance in Big Night!.

== Early life ==
Catherine Janice Yap de Belen was born on November 9, 1968, to Philip Ilagan de Belen and Cynthia Susan Jimenez Yap. She has a younger sister, Gelli, who is also an actress.

At 13 years old, de Belen worked at Regal Entertainment, nicknamed the "Regal Cry Babies", along with Julie Vega, Snooky Serna, and Maricel Soriano.

In 1986, de Belen had a successful career with TV soaps and films. Her career was halted when she got pregnant at age 18. The father of her child was Aga Muhlach, her screen partner in the films Erpat kong Forgets, Napakasakit Kuya Eddie, Bakit Madalas ang Tibok ng Puso, When I Fall in Love and others.

== Career ==
At the age of nine, she became a newscaster for RPN 9's NewsWatch Kids Edition. She got her biggest break from the same channel when she got the lead role in the soap opera Flordeluna a TV soap where she played Flor from 1979 until 1984, when she momentarily quit showbiz to continue her studies. The soap continued to air a few more years after Janice left but it started going on a downward trend and never regained its popularity.

De Belen returned to showbiz, returning to TV with the soap Jesy and the early evening variety show The Big, Big Show. She was considered the "80s Teen Drama Princess" alongside Julie Vega, whose soap Anna Liza provided stiff competition to Flordeluna. In the 1980s, de Belen and Vega co-starred in a number films, mostly produced by Regal Films. In 1982, de Belen was partnered with Gabby Concepcion through the films Puppy Love and Home Sweet Home.

She returned to the world of TV in soap in 1985 with Andrea Amor and Don Camote dela Mancha, both aired on GMA 7. Her transformation from a teenage star to a serious actress started in 1989 when she topbilled Mina Films' Rosenda opposite erstwhile boyfriend Gabby Concepcion. She received her first Best Actress, the Raha Sulayman Award, recognition in 1991 for Vision Films' Kailan Ka Magiging Akin, a Manila Film Festival entry.

In 2001–2010, after her separation from husband John Estrada, she hosted the morning talk show SiS also on GMA-7 with sister Gelli de Belen and their friend Carmina Villarroel.

In 2010, de Belen was one of those names have been inducted into the Eastwood City Walk of Fame.

In 2011–2012, she starred in the TV series Budoy. She followed it up with performance in the television series Ina, Kapatid, Anak which aired on the Primetime Bida Block and worldwide through TFC from 2012 to 2013.

She co-hosted Showbiz Inside Report as well from February 2012 to October 2013 and until recently, was also doing Buzz ng Bayan with Boy Abunda.

In 2016, she moved back to GMA to appear in Destined to Be Yours and My Korean Jagiya.

In 2018, she returned to ABS-CBN and was cast in The General's Daughter and Sino ang Maysala?: Mea Culpa, various episodes of Maalaala Mo Kaya, La Vida Lena, Love in 40 Days and Dirty Linen.

== Personal life ==
John Estrada and De Belen were married in 1992, and they had four children – Inah, Moira, Kaila, and Yuan. Iggy "Luigi" Boy Muhlach is her eldest from her previous relationship with actor Aga Muhlach.

She graduated with a diploma in Culinary Arts under Chef Gene Gonzales at the Center for Asian Culinary Studies in San Juan.

On March 19, 2016, her mother died at the age of 67 due to multiple organ failure.

She launched her personal YouTube channel where she show her cooking skills. Along with her sister Gelli, and their closest friends in showbiz Carmina Villarroel and Candy Pangilinan, they have a podcast called Wala Pa Kaming Title, which is also available on their respective YouTube channels.

=== Interest ===
De Belen loves stuffed toys and considers herself to be a "child at heart". She has a giraffe collection and owns a thousand giraffe items. She challenges herself and started to collect them when someone gave her the first giraffe stuffed toy in 2002.

== Filmography ==
=== Film ===
Year	Title	Role
1980	The Children of An Lac	Mai
1981	Tropang Bulilit	Flor
1981	Mga Basang Sisiw	
1981	Flor de Liza	Flor
1982	Manedyer... Si Kumander	
1982	Puppy Love	Florecita
1982	Where Love Has Gone	Crystal
1983	To Mama with Love	Marissa
1983	Home Sweet Home	
1983	Aking Prince Charming	Neneng
1983	Nagalit ang Buwan sa Haba ng Gabi	Jenny Almeda
1983	I'll Wait for You: If It Takes Forever!	Jenny
1983	Roman Rapido	Corazon
1983	Always in My Heart	Gina
March 22, 1984	Erpat Kong Forgets	Josephine
1984	Hawakan Mo at Pigilan ang Kahapon	
May 4, 1984	Dear Mama	Beth
June 15, 1984	Daddy's Little Darlings	Elizabeth "Boots" De Leon
July 26, 1984	Lovingly Yours, Helen: The Movie	Candy (segment "Candy")
August 17, 1984	Bigats	
September 7, 1984	14 Going Steady	Maita Belleza
October 11, 1984	May Daga sa Labas ng Lungga	Maria Josefina "Joey" Rabago
December 25, 1984	Shake, Rattle & Roll	Virgie (segment "Pridyider")
December 11, 1985	Super Wan-Tu-Tri	Amor
February 7, 1985	Life Begins at 40	
September 4, 1985	The Crazy Professor	Katrina
October 17, 1985	Bakit Manipis ang Ulap?	Maria Cristina "Cristy" Austria
December 25, 1985	OKS Na OKS Pakner	
April 24, 1986	Ano Ka, Hilo?	Jeanet
July 17, 1986	Super Islaw and the Flying Kids	Juanita
December 11, 1986	Bakit Madalas ang Tibok ng Puso?	Anna
September 17, 1986	Nasaan Ka Nang Kailangan Kita?	Diana
March 20, 1986	Napakasakit, Kuya Eddie	Sandra
March 14, 1986	When I Fall in Love	Nancy
December 25, 1986	Payaso	
May 14, 1987	Remember Me Mama	Evelyn
January 15, 1986	Menudo't Pandesal	
January 4, 1987	Once Upon a Time	Gwen
March 24, 1988	Nakausap Ko ang Birhen	Julia
May 5, 1988	Nasaan Ka Inay?	Amanda
July 20, 1988	Hawakan at Pigilan ang Panahon	
October 27, 1988	Tiyanak	Julie
November 16, 1988	Babaing Hampaslupa	Eden
1989	Rosenda	Rosenda
1989	Bakit Iisa Lamang ang Puso?	Jessica Benitez
1989	Mahirap ang Magmahal	
1989	Isang Araw Walang Diyos	Sis. Camille
1989	Abandonada	Mia
1989	Last Two Minutes	
1990	Flavor of the Month	
1990	Tayo Na sa Dilim	Sandy
1990	Bakit Kay Tagal ng Sandali?	Lolit
1990	Alyas Pogi: Birador ng Nueva Ecija	Estela Mallari-Cruz
1990	Shake, Rattle & Roll II	Cathy & Living Dead (segment "Multo" & "Kulam")
1991	Mahalin Mo ang Asawa Ko	Anna
1991	Pakasalan Mo Ako	Arlene
1991	Isabel Aquino: I Want to Live	Isabel Aquino
1991	Anak ni Janice	Janice
1991	Umiyak Pati Langit	
1991	Kailan Ka Magiging Akin	Dolor
1991	Shake, Rattle & Roll III	Rosalyn (segment "Ate")
1992	Ikaw ang Lahat sa Akin	Agnes Salcedo
1992	Aswang	Rosita
1992	Guwapings: The First Adventure	
1992	Shake, Rattle & Roll IV	Tising (segment "Ang Kapitbahay")
1992	Engkanto	Karina
1993	Maricris Sioson: Japayuki	Cynthia
1993	Milagro	
1994	Wating	Julie
1994	The Fatima Buen Story	Batman
1995	Araw-Araw, Gabi-Gabi	
1996	Taguan	Sister Shawie
1997	Hari ng Yabang	
2004	Annie B.	Millet
2006	Tulay	
2009	Last Viewing	Laura
2009	Shake, Rattle & Roll XI	Nurse (segment "Diablo")
2011	Remington and the Curse of the Zombadings	Fe
2012	The Healing	Cita
2012	Pridyider	Mrs. Benitez
2012	Mga Mumunting Lihim	Olive
2012	Tiktik: The Aswang Chronicles	Fely
2012	The Strangers	Paloma
2012	Shake, Rattle and Roll Fourteen: The Invasion	Myra (segment "Pamana")
2013	Raketeros	
2013	Call Center Girl	
2014	T'yanak	Nurse
2015	Haunted Mansion	Miss Gonzales
2016	I Love You to Death	Pinky
2016	Ringgo: The Dog Shooter	
2021	Big Night!	Melba
2022	Sugat sa Dugo (Wounded Blood)	
2024	Road Trip	Gigi
2025	Shake, Rattle & Roll: Evil Origins	Madre Juana (segment “1775”)
2025	I'mPerfect	Yaya Claring
2026	Poon †	TBA

=== Television/Digital ===
Year	Title	Role	Notes	Source
1976–1978	Kool!!!	Rica		
1978	RPN NewsWatch Junior Edition	Herself - Host		
1978–1984	Flordeluna	Flordeluna Alicante	Main Role / Protagonist	
1979	Marcelino Pan y Vino	Dahlia	Main Role / Protagonist	
1983	Lovingly Yours, Helen	Laila	Guest Role	
1995–1996	Familia Zaragoza	Lupe Lagrimas	Main role / Protagonist	
1997–1999	Mula sa Puso	Cornelia "Connie" Matias	Special participation / Antagonist	
1997	Wansapanataym	Jackie	Episode: Balete	
2000–2001	Saan Ka Man Naroroon	Margarita Javier	Supporting Role	
2001–2010	SiS	Herself - Host		
2003	Magpakailanman	Alicia Trinidad Castro	Episode: The Bert “Tawa” Marcelo Story	
2004	StarStruck	Herself - Council member		
2004	StarStruck Kids	Herself - Council member		
2007–2015	Spoon	Herself - Host		
2007	Boys Nxt Door	Miss Malinis	Minor Role	
2009	Mars Ravelo's Darna	Aling Consuelo	Support Role / Anti-Hero	
2010	Endless Love	Suzette "Suzy" Cruz	Support Role / Anti-Hero	
2011	Dwarfina	Marissa Ballesteros		
2011	Magic Palayok	Magic Palayok		
2011–2012	Budoy	Elena Dizon	Support Role / Protagonist	
2012	Kapamilya, Deal or No Deal	Herself - Contestant		
2012	Gandang Gabi, Vice!	Herself - Guest		
2012–2013	Showbiz Inside Report	Herself - Host		
2012–2013	Ina, Kapatid, Anak	Beatrice Elizalde-Marasigan	Main Role / Anti-Hero	
2013	Toda Max	Madame Jeanette Magpoles	Guest Role	
2013	Buzz ng Bayan	Herself - Co-host		
2013–2014	Honesto	Lourdes Galang	Support Role / Protagonist	
2014	Bet On Your Baby	Herself - Contestant	Together with her son Luigi and her granddaughter	
2014	Maalaala Mo Kaya	Lorelei Go	Episode: "Wedding Gown"	
2015	Ipaglaban Mo!	Vicky	Episode: "Ang Lahat Ng Sa Akin"	
2015	Oh My G!	Rose "Teacher Ninang" Luna	Support Role / Protagonist	
2016	Be My Lady	Marcela "Marcy" Bernabe-Crisostomo	Support Role / Protagonist	
2017	Destined to be Yours	Sally Obispo	Support Role / Protagonist	
2017	Sunday PinaSaya	Herself - Guest		
2017	People vs. the Stars	Herself - Contestant	with Tom Rodriguez & Dennis Trillo	
2017	Celebrity Bluff	Herself - Contestant	with her daughter Inah	
2017	Magpakailanman	Julieta Manuel	Episode: "May Forever"	
2017	Dear Uge	Episode Guest	With her daughter Inah	
2017	Magpakailanman	Mildred Perez	Episode: "Homeless in Hongkong"	
2017–2018	My Korean Jagiya	Adelaida "Aida" Asuncion-Villanueva	Support Role / Protagonist	
2018	Ipaglaban Mo!	Leona	Episode: "Hawig"	
2018	Magpakailanman	Tina Medina	Episode: "The Blind Teacher"	
2018	Wansapanataym	Lorna Ortiz	Episode: "Ofishially Yours"	
2019	The General's Daughter	Amelia Montemayor-Guerrero	Main Role / Antagonist	
2019	Sino ang May Sala?: Mea Culpa	Amor Capuyan	Guest Role / Protagonist	
2019	Maalaala Mo Kaya	Teba	Episode: "Medalya"	
2020	Maalaala Mo Kaya	Maria Azon "Marizo" Alejo	Episode: "Mata"	
2020	All-Out Sundays	Herself / Guest	Reunion with SiS co-hosts Carmina Villarroel and sister Gelli de Belen; online show	
2020	Bangon Talentadong Pinoy	Herself / Talent scout		
2020	Fluid	Mama Mildred		
2020–2022	La Vida Lena	Dra. Ramona Joaquin	Main Role / Anti-Hero	
2021	Magandang Buhay	Herself	Guest Ku-Momshie	
2021	It's Showtime	Herself	Royal Choose-gado for ReIna ng Tahanan, and other appearances	
2022	Love in 40 Days	Ofelia Abanilla / Jocelyn "Josie" Rosal	Support Role / Protagonist	
2023	Dirty Linen	Leona Roque-Fiero	Main Role / Antagonist	
2024	What's Wrong with Secretary Kim	Carlota Castillo	Support Role	
2024–2025	Saving Grace	Helena Sarmiento	Support Role / Anti-Hero	
2025	Lilet Matias: Attorney-at-Law	Atty. Clarisse Zamora	Guest Role	
2025	Maalaala Mo Kaya	Aiding Vasquez	Episode: "Apoy"	
2025–2026	Roja	Rowena "Wendy" Bonifacio	Main Role / Protagonist	

== Awards and nominations ==
De Belen has been recognised by the Filipino Academy of Movie Arts and Sciences (FAMAS) and Metro Manila Film Festival (MMFF) for the following performances:

- 30th FAMAS Awards: Best Child Actress, nomination, for Tropang Bulilit (1981)
- 38th FAMAS Awards: Best Actress, nomination, for Rosenda (1989)
- 39th FAMAS Awards: Best Supporting Actress, nomination, for Bakit Kay Tagal ng Sandali (1990)
- 58th FAMAS Awards: Best Actress, nomination, for Last Viewing (2009)
- 65th FAMAS Awards: Best Actress, nomination, for Ringgo: The Dog Shooter (2016)
- 70th FAMAS Awards: Best Supporting Actress, win, for Big Night! (2022)
- 51st Metro Manila Film Festival: Best Supporting Actress, nomination, for I'mperfect (2025)
