= Lady Lee =

Filipina actress

Ma. Kristina Edrosa Lee (born c. 1986), better known as Lady Lee, is a former child actress in the Philippines. She was the 1st Runner-Up in the Little Miss Philippines 1990 segment in Eat Bulaga!.

== Career ==
She is the contemporary of Aiza Seguerra in Eat Bulaga's Little Miss Philippines. She was nominated for Best Child Actress FAMAS Award in Kailan Ka Magiging Akin (1991). She appeared in films such as Leon at Tigre (1989) starring Maricel Soriano and Rene Requiestas and The Vizconde Massacre Story (1993) starring Kris Aquino, among others. She's currently working in a BPO Industry with high hopes to build her career on a different form.

== Personal life ==
She has a daughter who wants to join the show business.

== Filmography ==
=== Film ===
- Leon at Tigre (1989)
- Goosebuster (1991)
- Kailan Ka Magiging Akin (1991) as Mariel
- The Good, The Bad, & The Ugly (1992)
- Pido Dida 3: May Kambal Na (1992)
- Boy Anghel: Utak Pulburon (1992)
- Shake, Rattle & Roll IV (1992)
- The Vizconde Massacre Story (God Help Us!) (1993) as Jennifer Vizconde
- Silang Mga Sisiw Sa Lansangan (1993)
- Tunay Na Magkaibigan, Walang Iwanan... Peksman (1994)
- Ulong Pugot: Naglalagot (1995)

=== Television ===
- Eat Bulaga! (1990–1997)
- Luv Ko Si Kris (1991–1992)
- Ipaglaban Mo! (Episode: "Sana, Napupulot ang Pagmamahal", 1993)
- Kadenang Kristal (1995–1996)
- Ang Iibigin ay Ikaw (2002–2003)
- At Your Service - Child Stars Reunited (2005)
