= Kailan Ka Magiging Akin =

1991 crime thriller melodrama film by Chito S. Roño

- Official movie poster
- Directed by: Chito S. Roño
- Written by: Mia A. Concio
- Produced by: Charo Santos-Concio
- Starring: Janice de Belen; Gabby Concepcion; Lady Lee; Eddie Gutierrez; Charo Santos-Concio; Vivian Velez; Gina Alajar; Julio Diaz; Carmina Villarroel; Cherry Pie Picache
- Cinematography: Jun Pereira
- Edited by: Ike Jarlego Jr.
- Music by: Nonong Buencamino
- Production company: Vision Films
- Distributed by: Vision Films (Note: Vision Films is one of the two predecessors of the current-day Star Cinema, which currently owns the library.)
- Release date: 20 June 1991
- Running time: 120 minutes
- Country: Philippines
- Language: Filipino

Kailan Ka Magiging Akin (English: When Will You Be Mine) is a 1991 Philippine crime thriller melodrama film directed by Chito S. Roño from a story and screenplay written by Mia A. Concio, based on the DYHP Cebu radio drama Anak Ko. The story follows Mariel, who was raised by the Gatchalian family and nanny Dolor after being sold by Ben to Adul as a baby. However, Dolor was wrongfully implicated in kidnapping Mariel, although she discovered Adul's plans to sell Mariel to a German, while her lawyer fiancé, Ramir, discovered the information that proved Adul's illegal activities.

The film stars Janice de Belen, Gabby Concepcion, Eddie Gutierrez, Charo Santos-Concio, Vivian Velez, Gina Alajar, Julio Diaz, Carmina Villarroel, and Cherry Pie Picache, and child actress Lady Lee. The theme song of the same name was performed by Dulce, with compositions by Nonong Buencamino and lyrics by Jose Bartolome.

Produced and distributed by Vision Films, the film was theatrically released on 20 June 1991, as one of the entries for the newly revived Manila Film Festival. In 2025, the film was digitally scanned and enhanced by ABS-CBN Film Restoration.

== Plot ==
After Shirley gave birth, Ben sold baby Mariel to Adul because he was not the biological father. Before she would give Mariel up to Adul, who would go to the United States, she held her one last time and then went into despair. However, after a verbal confrontation with the visa processing officer following the denial of Mariel's visa application, she entrusted the child to her doctor cousin, Jaime Gatchalian, whose wife, Leila, a lawyer, opposed raising another orphan. With Mariel under the Gatchalian couple's care and Adul gone to the United States, Jaime hired Dolor, the midwife who delivered Shirley, as her nanny, despite her lawyer boyfriend, Ramir, objecting. One day, when Dolor noticed her employer's wife being hostile toward her and Mariel, Bito, the family's housekeeper, told her that she and Jaime had once been a happy married couple. However, their marriage was strained after Leila devastatingly gave birth to their stillborn child. Later on, with Adul's help, Jaime adopted Tess as their child, though Leila chose to ignore her.

On her birthday, Leila returns home, only to be angered when Dolor and baby Mariel appear. This prompts Tess to blame Dolor and Mariel for ruining their lives, but Dolor reminds her that she is an orphan. The next day, Tess forgave Dolor, who accepted it, and decided to help her care for Mariel. Three days later, Leila was infuriated when her boss fired her for mishandling her client's case and neglecting her duties because of her long absence. Days and months later, Mariel's biological mother, Shirley, found that the Gatchalians had properly raised Mariel. One day, Leila becomes more infuriated when Dolor uses the leftover vegetable dish to feed baby Mariel. With this, she violently expelled her and the baby from the house, causing them to stay at Ramir's house. Much to Ramir's rage, he finds that Dolor spends most of her time taking care of Mariel, which causes him to have an affair with his law professor, Lyn. On the same day, Jaime shows up and begs Dolor to return home with baby Mariel. Later, Dolor and Shirley meet, and the latter asks the former about her daughter, Mariel.

One night, after Adul warned Jaime not to bring Mariel to the United States because of her legal problems, Jaime and Leila got into a heated argument over Dolor and Mariel's return, and Leila angrily berated her husband for ruining her life. Hurt by her harsh words, Jaime angrily left the house, and Tess scolded her mother for being heartless to the nanny and the baby. Because of her actions, she tries to commit suicide by overdose, but when she wakes up, Dolor reminds Leila to feel remorse for her actions towards her, her husband, daughter, and Mariel. When Leila sees Mariel crying, she comforts her, only to deeply regret her actions and misgivings toward her and the others. Leila decides to forgive Dolor, Tess, and Jaime, and with a change of heart, she agrees that Mariel will stay.

Three years later, Mariel grew into a little girl and spent much time with her foster family and Dolor, whom she deeply loved. When they returned from a trip, Adul showed up, and it was revealed that she had been jailed for 10 months in an American prison, fled to Europe, and remarried a German. With her arrival, Adul wants to take Mariel, who later tells Dolor that she doesn't like her. In Olongapo, Ben became suspicious of Adul's activities, including the idea of selling Mariel to a German man. At home, Dolor hears Adul and her goons' plan of kidnapping Mariel. The next day, Adul escorts Dolor and Mariel to the department store. Since Dolor knew her plan, she and Mariel escaped, evading Adul and her goons and avoiding kidnapping. The two hide out at the community where Ben and Shirley live, and Dolor tells the latter about Adul's plan to kidnap Mariel. When Ben showed up, Shirley berated him for being an accomplice to Adul's activities.

When the goons arrived, Dolor, Mariel, and Shirley, along with Aling Doreng, who called the police, ran for their lives while the neighbors tried to fight them back. Before they reached the national road, the goons shot Shirley, who was pregnant, to death. When the authorities arrived, expecting to arrest the goons, they arrested Dolor instead for kidnapping Mariel. Ramir knew from his observations that Dolor was innocent, and by the time she was freed from detention, he and Leila had decided to act as her counsel. The trial began when the witnesses told the court about what happened and Dolor's knowledge about kidnapping Mariel and selling her to a German, which Adul denied. Later on, Lyn joins the court battle as another counsel for Dolor.

The trial's progress remained slow until Ramir, along with his lawyer friends, began finding evidence in Jaime's office, and then he found documents revealing that Adul had been listed as the mother of eight children in their birth certificates since 1983 and had sold them to wealthy couples. With this, Jaime confronts Adul about the issue, but the latter repeatedly denies it and angrily tells the former to bring it to court. Meanwhile, Ramir then confronts Ben about being an accomplice to Adul's criminal activities. Ben is hesitant to give the information since his wife was shot to death, until he agrees to tell after Ramir mauled him.

On the following day, Ramir presents the evidence to the court about Adul being listed as the mother of the children she sold and her involvement in various activities related to the case. Later, Ben shows up at the court to give his testimony, telling the judge he was her accomplice. As Adul stands up from the witness chair, she angrily informs the public and the court that everything Ben says is a lie. As she was cited for contempt, the public, including Dolor, her counsel, and the Gatchalians, was shocked when Adul admitted she had paid a great deal of money to buy Mariel from Ben. When she realizes her mistake, Adul's outburst becomes severe, and she gets a gun from the police and shoots Ben. Fortunately, he survived a gunshot wound to his right shoulder.

With Adul's admission of her actions, the court found Dolor Lamasco, the professional midwife, innocent of the crime of kidnapping. With the presence of the others, including Dolor, Ramir, and the Gatchalians, Ben tells Mariel that her life is now peaceful again. The film concludes with Mariel's baptism, attended by Ramir, Dolor, and the Gatchalian family.

== Cast ==
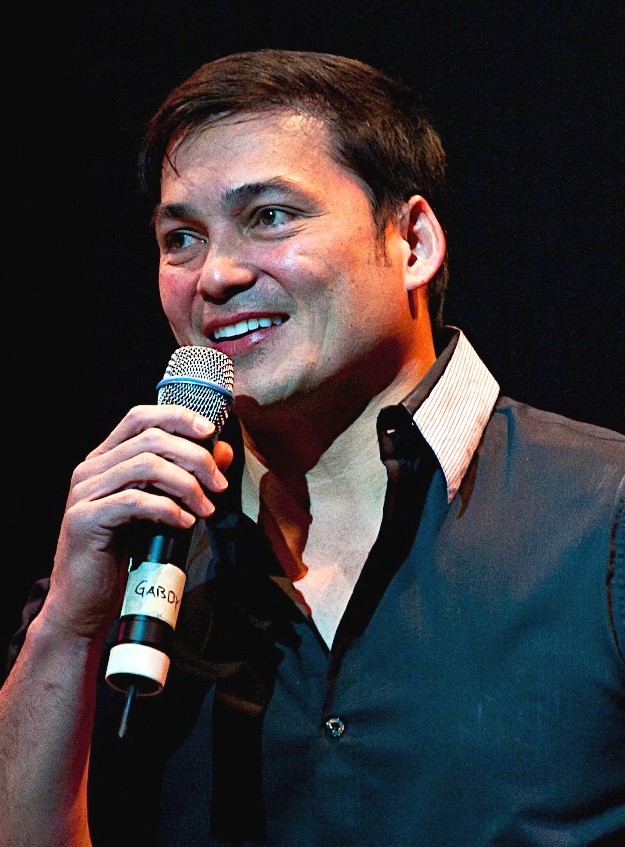
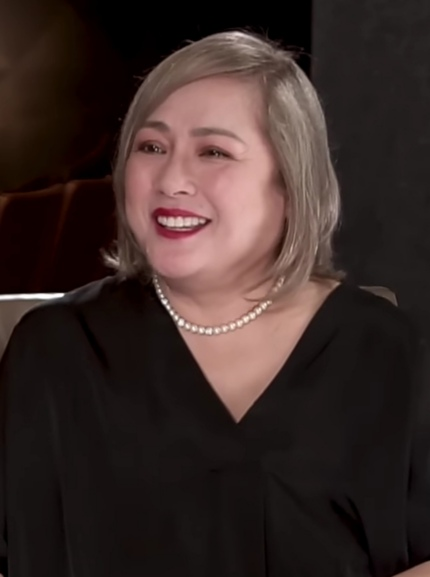
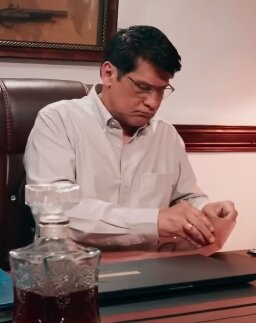
Gabby Concepcion (leftmost), Gina Alajar (second left), Julio Diaz (second right), and Cherry Pie Picache (rightmost) respectively played the roles of Ramir, Shirley, Ben, and Lyn.

Main cast

- Janice de Belen as Dolor Lamasco: A professional midwife who wholeheartedly takes care of Mariel
- Gabby Concepcion as Ramir Macalincag: A lawyer who is Dolor's boyfriend
- Lady Lee as Mariel: The illegitimate daughter of Shirley and another man
- Eddie Gutierrez as Dr. Jaime Gatchalian: A doctor who is Adul's cousin and Leila's husband
- Charo Santos-Concio as Leila Gatchalian: A lawyer who is Jaime's wife and Dolor's employer and counsel
- Vivian Velez as Adul de Jesus: A child trafficker
- Gina Alajar as Shirley Santos: Ben's wife and Mariel's biological mother
- Julio Diaz as Ben Santos: Shirley's husband who sold Mariel to Adul after learning he is not the father of the child
- Carmina Villarroel as Tess Gatchalian: The adoptive daughter of Jaime and Leila
- Cherry Pie Picache as Lyn: The professor of law at the University of Santo Tomas, who later joined as Dolor's counsel

Minor cast

- Ray Ventura as Adul's lawyer
- Cris Daluz as Zaldy: One of Shirley and Ben's neighbors
- Vangie Labalan as Doreng: One of Shirley and Ben's neighbors who is a storekeeper
- Pocholo Montes as Jaime's friend
- Resty Vergara as Selmo Rivera (Goon 1): Adul's gay and obese co-associate in child trafficking
- Jimmy Reyes and Rolly Gallo as the other two of the three goons whom Adul instructed to kidnap Mariel
- Ben Sagmit as Bito: The Gatchalian family's housekeeper
- Olivia Cenizal as Judge
- Nanding Fernandez as Fiscal
- Luis Benedicto as Priest
- Felindo Obach as Union Leader

== Production ==
Mia A. Concio wrote the film's story and screenplay, which was based on a radio drama, Anak Ko; this was her last written work before she went into a hiatus from screenwriting until 2000. Before he accepted the role of Ben, actor Julio Diaz previously turned down two film projects offered by Vision Films producer Charo Santos-Concio due to his assigned projects at Viva Films.

== Reception ==
=== Accolades ===
Award-giving organization	Date of ceremony	Category	Recipient(s)	Result	Ref.
Manila Film Festival	24 June 1991	Best Picture	Kailan Ka Magiging Akin	Won	
Manila Film Festival	24 June 1991	Best Actress	Janice de Belen	Won	
3rd Young Critics Circle Awards	27 January 1992	Best Performance by Male or Female, Adult or Child, Individual or Ensemble in Leading or Supporting Role	Gina Alajar	Nominated	
3rd Young Critics Circle Awards	27 January 1992	Best Achievement in Film Editing	Ike Jarlego Jr.	Won	
3rd Young Critics Circle Awards	27 January 1992	Best Achievement in Cinematography and Visual Design	Jun Pereira (cinematographer); Charlie Arceo (production designer)	Won	
40th FAMAS Awards	7 April 1992	Best Child Actress	Lady Lee	Nominated	

=== Critical response ===
Retrospective

Epoy Deyto, writing for Asian Movie Pulse, gave a positive retrospective review, praising Mia Concio's writing efforts to create an emotional impact through its dramatic sequences, acting performances of the cast, Ike Jarlego's editing where he successfully did the intent of "bombarding the audience with relentless dramatic peaks", and Chito Roño's direction.

Goldwin Reviews rated the film four out of five stars, with praise towards the screenplay, direction, intense scenes involving the characters, cinematography, and the cast's acting performances, particularly de Belen and Villarroel's strong acting skills and Velez's performance as a villainess was deemed "effortless".

Jim Paranal, writing for Film Police Reviews, gave praise to Roño's directional efforts, which proved that he can direct scenes that contain suspense as well as tonal shifts during the story despite being originated from a radio drama, acting performances of the cast, particularly Lady Lee's great acting as little Mariel, Charo Santos-Concio's portrayal of a cold-mannered character, and Vivian Velez's role as Adul, which he described as an "extension" to her character Catherine Posadas in the 1990 film Kasalanan Bang Sambahin Ka?, the intense confrontations, and the technical aspects.

== Restoration ==
Despite the limited resources they had (according to project head Leo Katigbak), Kailan Ka Magiging Akin was digitally scanned and enhanced by ABS-CBN Film Restoration, with film print scanning done by Marco Gatpandan, and Mikael Pestaño handled the enhancement of the frames. The scanned and enhanced version of the film first premiered in an advance screening on 27 March 2025 at the Ayala Malls The 30th and was attended by director Chito S. Roño, stars Janice de Belen, Carmina Villarroel, and Julio Diaz, and composer Nonong Buencamino.

The film was part of Sagip Pelikula's "A Rewind" special screenings, in partnership with Ayala Malls, from 9 to 13 April.
