= Shake, Rattle & Roll (film) =

1984 Filipino film

- Theatrical release poster
- Directed by: Emmanuel Borlaza (segment "Baso"); Ishmael Bernal (segment "Pridyider"); Peque Gallaga (segment "Manananggal")
- Written by: Jose Carreon (segment "Baso"); Amado Lacuesta Jr. (segment "Pridyider"); Rosauro Q. Dela Cruz (segment "Manananggal")
- Produced by: Douglas C. Quijano; Ivo C. Quijano; Mark C. Quijano
- Starring: Herbert Bautista; Charito Solis; William Martinez; Janice de Belen; Rey "PJ" Abellana; Joel Torre; Irma Alegre; Emily Loren; Arlene Muhlach; Mon Alvir; Peewee Quijano; Lito Gruet
- Cinematography: Ely R. Cruz
- Edited by: Jess Navarro
- Music by: Jaime Fabregas
- Production company: Athena Productions
- Distributed by: Regal Films; ABS-CBN Films (scanned and enhanced version)
- Release date: December 25, 1984
- Running time: 125 minutes
- Country: Philippines
- Language: Filipino

Shake, Rattle & Roll (stylized as Shake Rattle & Roll!) is a 1984 Filipino horror anthology film directed by Emmanuel H. Borlaza, Ishmael Bernal, and Peque Gallaga. It is the first installment in the Shake, Rattle & Roll film series. This was the only film in the series to be produced by Athena Productions, with the rest of the installments produced and distributed by Regal Films (now known as Regal Entertainment). The film's title is loosely based on the song of the same name.

The film consists of three stories: three friends using a spirit board are possessed by ghosts from a tragic love triangle; a family is terrorized by a possessed killer refrigerator; and a teenager courts a woman who is secretly a monster that splits her body in half. Shake, Rattle & Roll was an entry of the 10th Metro Manila Film Festival, with Herbert Bautista winning Best Actor for his role in the "Manananggal" segment.

After Regal revived the series, it later spawned a film series consisting of sixteen films, including a remake of the "Pridyider" segment. The second installment, Shake, Rattle & Roll II, was released in 1990 under Regal Films. For its 40th anniversary, the film was digitally scanned and enhanced in high-definition by the ABS-CBN Film Restoration Project as part of the Metro Manila Film Festival's Sine Sigla sa Singkwenta 50-film lineup, starting from September 25 to October 15, 2024.

== Plot ==
=== "Baso" ===
Paolo, his girlfriend Girlie, and his friend Johnny arrive at an abandoned house managed by caretaker Mang Castor. As Paolo locks the doors, Johnny flirts with Girlie. The three then partake in the ritual 'spirit of the glass' and summon three spirits: Isabel, Ibarra, and Juanito. The spirits quickly break free from the glass, possess the teens, and seemingly relive their feud from the Spanish colonial era.

Isabel, the daughter of wealthy meztisos, briefly meets with her lover Juanito, a Filipino revolutionary. She fears for his safety despite Juanito's optimism. Shortly after their rendezvous, Isabel is visited by Ibarra, Juanito's friend, who has just returned from studying overseas. Ibarra confesses his love for Isabel but she holds off on his proposal of marriage.

Juanito is later reportedly killed in battle and news of his death devastates Isabel. In her grief, she agrees to marry Ibarra and the two move into their new home. As they celebrate their marriage that evening, they are suddenly attacked by a severely wounded and enraged Juanito. Ibarra manages to kill Juanito but the latter vows revenge as he dies. Guilt-ridden for having murdered his friend, Ibarra commits suicide. Isabel subsequently falls ill from depression and dies. Their spirits haunt the house which soon falls into disrepair.

Back in the present, Johnny/Juanito attacks Paolo/Ibarra with an axe as Girlie/Isabel begs them to stop. Mang Castor arrives and exorcises them with holy water. The teens seem to recover until Johnny, inspired by Juanito's vendetta and acting on his desires for Girlie, stabs Paolo with the axe. Paolo, having secretly brought a gun, shoots Johnny. They both drop dead in front of Girlie as she screams in despair.

=== "Pridyider" ===
Lorna Delfin and her daughter Virgie move into a new house after Lorna's husband traveled to Saudi Arabia for work. Accompanying them is their housekeeper Nelia and the husband's lecherous nephew Dodong. Among the amenities included in the house is an old refrigerator.

Lorna is soon tormented by hallucinations of viscera and body parts in and around the refrigerator. One night, Nelia goes to get a snack from the fridge only to be repeatedly slammed by the fridge door until she dies. Her death prompts a detailed investigation by Detective Caloy Torres who initially suspects Dodong despite Lorna's insistence of a more sinister force. At night, Dodong peeps at Virgie cooling herself in front of the fridge.

Virgie invites her boyfriend Max to stay the night at the house. He soon disappears, leaving behind his jacket. The following morning, Lorna is horrified to discover Max's severed arm in the fridge. Torres returns to question the family and apprehend Dodong as the prime suspect. Instead, they both find Dodong's severed head in the fridge.

Torres and his colleagues research past cases and find coverage of a 1975 case involving a refrigerator. He races to the house just as the entity possessing the fridge lures Virgie in to consume her. Torres and Lorna struggle to free Virgie until Lorna rips off the refrigerator plug. The entity is seemingly dispelled.

Torres's colleagues later confirm that in 1975, a serial rapist murdered his victims and stored their body parts in his refrigerator.

=== "Manananggal" ===
Douglas, a Visayan teenager, stays with his grandmother to help raise his young brothers Gio and Zia while their parents are working in Davao. At night, he serenades a mysterious young woman, Anita, at her hut deep in the forest with his reluctant companion Kadyo.

Kadyo leaves early and Douglas finds him in the morning, murdered. He later helps Zia search for their pet dog. They return home to their grandmother who warns them of the manananggal, a vampiric creature believed to be responsible for murders committed amongst the locals during Holy Week. She insinuates that Anita is the creature.

On Good Friday, Douglas is stalked by Anita through the forest until he arrives a small shrine attended to by a penitent. He lingers at the shrine until nightfall and, emboldened by the penitent, tracks Anita down where he witnesses her transform into a manananggal. She separates from her lower body and flies off to hunt. Douglas mutilates her lower half with salt and holy water before hurrying back home.

Anita assaults the house as the family barricade themselves in and Douglas fends her off with a penitent's whip. As morning dawns, Anita flies back into the woods to reconnect with her body but upon finding her lower half destroyed, she furiously returns to the house. With Gio's help, Douglas drags Anita into the sunlight where she dies.

Later that day - Black Saturday - the family burns Anita's remains. They are visited by two young boys who deliver medicine for the brothers and return their dog, joking with Douglas about burning a manananggal.

== Cast ==
=== Baso ===
- Rey "PJ" Abellana as Paolo / Ibarra
- Joel Torre as Johnny / Juanito
- Arlene Muhlach as Girlie / Isabel
- Rosemarie Gil as Soledad
- Tony Carreon as Antonio

=== Pridyider ===
- Charito Solis† as Lorna Delfin
- William Martinez as Dodong
- Janice de Belen as Virgie Delfin
- Emily Loren as Nelia
- Mon Alvir as Max
- Lito Gruet as Detective Caloy Torres

=== Manananggal ===
- Herbert Bautista as Douglas
- Irma Alegre as Anita
- Peewee Quijano as Gio
- Mary Walter† as Lola
- Pen Medina as Flagellant

== Reception ==
=== Legacy ===
In 2018, Jio de Leon of Spot.ph ranked the refrigerator from the film's "Pridyider" segment eighth on his list of the "Top 10 Scariest Pinoy Horror Movie Monsters".

== Accolades ==
Year	Award-giving body	Category	Recipient	Result
1984	Metro Manila Film Festival	Best Actor	Herbert Bautista (segment "Manananggal")	Won

== Later films and remake ==
Shake, Rattle & Roll is followed by sixteen films, spawning a film series. Each film brings returning actors from each film to reprise different characters.

In 2012, the "Pridyider" segment was adapted into a film of the same name.

== Restoration ==
An existing 35mm print of the film was digitally scanned in 4K resolution and enhanced in 2K resolution by the ABS-CBN Film Restoration Project to celebrate the film and the series' 40th anniversary. The restored version also premiered as part of the Sine Sigla sa Singkwenta 50-film lineup of the Metro Manila Film Festival, from September 25 to October 15, 2024.

== See also ==
- List of ghost films
