= Showbiz Inside Report =

- First generation logo
- Genre: Entertainment, Talk show
- Written by: Leo Bernardo; Vince Patrick Bersola; Lilian Buenaventura; Sol Caco; Diane Morona; Aicah Sopeña; Rochelle Veron
- Directed by: Arnel Natividad
- Presented by: Janice de Belen; Carmina Villarroel; Ogie Diaz; Joey Marquez
- Country of origin: Philippines
- Original languages: Filipino (primary); English (secondary)

Production
- Executive producer: Lani Gutierrez
- Producer: Marie Grace Manuel
- Editors: Niño Co; Earl Ellustrisimo; Levi James Ligon
- Running time: 60 minutes
- Production company: ABS-CBN Studios

Original release
- Network: ABS-CBN
- Release: February 4, 2012 – September 28, 2013

Showbiz Inside Report (SIR) is a Philippine television talk show broadcast by ABS-CBN. Hosted by Ogie Diaz, Janice de Belen, Carmina Villarroel and Joey Marquez. it aired on the network's Yes Weekend line up from February 4, 2012 to September 28, 2013, replacing Entertainment Live.

On March 23, 2013, Joey Marquez announced that he will leave the show due to political responsibilities. On April 6, 2013, the show celebrated its first anniversary and welcomes Villarroel's husband Zoren Legaspi to replace Marquez as a guest host. Marquez later returned after he lost the 2013 elections.

== Origin ==
The Saturday talk show serves weekly updates and serves two investigative reports based on the week or months trending topics or two featured Philippine artists, whether in the public scene or in the showbiz industry.

== Hosts ==
=== Main hosts ===
- Janice de Belen (2012–2013)
- Carmina Villarroel (2012–2013)
- Ogie Diaz (2012–2013)
- Joey Marquez (2012–2013)

=== Online hosts ===
- Cesca Litton
- MJ Felipe

=== Guest host ===
- Zoren Legaspi (2013)

== See also ==
- List of programs broadcast by ABS-CBN
