= Spoon (TV program) =

- Genre: Talk show
- Created by: Net 25
- Presented by: Janice de Belen
- Country of origin: Philippines
- Original language: Filipino

Production
- Running time: 1 hour

Original release
- Network: NET25
- Release: March 25, 2007 – August 9, 2015

Spoon is a Philippine noontime cooking and celebrity talk show. The show has premiered on March 25, 2007, and hosted by Janice de Belen until it ended for eight years in 2015 on NET25. It was relaunched with the slogan "I Am One With 25". The show uses a talk show premise with its celebrity guests while they are cooking meals with the host. Eddie Garcia and Dolphy are among the celebrity guests in the show.

== Awards and nominations ==
Awards and nominations
Year	Award giving body	Category	Nominated work/ Person	Results
2009	23rd PMPC (Philippine Movie Press Club) Star Awards for Television	Best Celebrity Talk Show	Spoon	Included
2009	23rd PMPC (Philippine Movie Press Club) Star Awards for Television	Best Celebrity Talk Show Host	Janice de Belen	Won
2010	24th PMPC (Philippine Movie Press Club) Star Awards for Television	Best Celebrity Talk Show	Spoon	Won
2010	24th PMPC (Philippine Movie Press Club) Star Awards for Television	Best Celebrity Talk Show Host	Janice de Belen	Won
2011	25th PMPC (Philippine Movie Press Club) Star Awards for Television	Best Celebrity Talk Show	Spoon	Included
2011	25th PMPC (Philippine Movie Press Club) Star Awards for Television	Best Celebrity Talk Show Host	Janice de Belen	Won
2014	28th Star Awards for Television	Best Celebrity Talk Show	Spoon	Included

== See also ==
- List of NET25 original programming
