= Pridyider =

2012 film by Rico Maria Ilarde

- Theatrical release poster
- Directed by: Rico Maria Ilarde
- Screenplay by: Rico Maria Ilarde; Rona Lean Sales
- Story by: Rico Maria Ilarde
- Based on: "Pridyider" by Ishmael Bernal
- Produced by: Lily Y. Monteverde; Roselle Y. Monteverde
- Starring: Andi Eigenmann; JM de Guzman; Janice de Belen
- Cinematography: Mackie Galvez
- Edited by: Lawrence S. Ang
- Music by: Teresa Barrozo
- Production company: Regal Entertainment
- Release date: September 19, 2012
- Running time: 90 minutes
- Country: Philippines
- Languages: Filipino; English
- Box office: US$117,479.00

Pridyider (Tagalog: [pɾɪˈdʒidɛr]; lit. 'Fridge') is a 2012 Filipino supernatural horror film directed by Rico Maria Ilarde, starring Janice de Belen, JM de Guzman and Andi Eigenmann. A spin-off of the Shake, Rattle & Roll film series, it is a remake and feature-length adaptation of Ishmael Bernal's segment of the same name from the first film. The film follows a young woman who returns to her childhood home and inherits a possessed refrigerator that feeds on human flesh and holds the secret to her parents' disappearance.

The film was released nationwide on September 19, 2012, under Regal Entertainment.

Janice de Belen was the only cast member from the original episode who is part of the cast. Co-star Joel Torre was also a part of the original film but was cast in another episode, "Baso".

== Plot ==
Tina arrives from abroad in her former home which she inherited from her parents, when she receives the news of her mother's suicide and her father's disappearance. The refrigerator starts taking lives, starting with Tina's friend's pet cat. Her manager tries to give her another chance, until the refrigerator takes him alive, despite Tina trying to rescue him from the tentacles. When she and her boyfriend try to open the refrigerator, they are sprayed with blood.

The refrigerator is later revealed to be cursed by a demon who her mother made a deal with to sate her vengeance on her husband, according to a former detective turned hunter who was obsessed with the case involving her parents. Tina's mother killed the women who she suspects to be her husband's mistresses, chopping them up and feeding their corpses on the refrigerator, until the police saw her corpse in the refrigerator. The detective was blinded when he tried to open the refrigerator. They also consult with the priest, giving them instructions to defeat the demon. Her father appears as a grotesque faced man, when he accidentally doused with boiling oil while he was cooking and he fell upon the floor, following the cauldron.

When they prepare an explosive formula to destroy the refrigerator, Tina's father sacrifices himself as bait as the refrigerator drags him. The couple push the refrigerator, Tina descends to the hole, revealing the demon's victims, some dead, others barely conscious. She lights the bomb, but her mother appears holding a cleaver and fights her own daughter, but her father, barely conscious, holds his wife and asks Tina to leave. The bomb goes off, destroying the hellhole and the refrigerator and saving the couple.

== Cast ==
=== Main cast ===
- Andi Eigenmann as Tina Benitez
- JM de Guzman as James

=== Supporting cast ===
- Janice de Belen as Mrs. Benitez
- Bekimon as Agatha
- Joel Torre as Mr. Benitez
- Ronnie Lazaro as Detective Albay
- Baron Geisler as Dick
- Venus Raj as Celine
- Lui Manansala as Tita Angie
- Hector Macaso as Atty. Taballo
- Rolly Inocencio as Priest

== Rating ==
The rating of this film is rated PG-13 for some horror, strong violence, action, suspense and thriller.

== See also ==
- Shake, Rattle & Roll (film series)
- Shake, Rattle & Roll (film)
- List of ghost films
