= Sis (talk show) =

Philippine television talk show

- Title card from 2007 to 2009
- Also known as: Sis: Janice & Gelli
- Genre: Talk show
- Directed by: Noel Cabacungan; Louie Ignacio
- Presented by: Gelli de Belen; Janice de Belen; Carmina Villarroel
- Voices of: Marites "Tessbomb" Marañon
- Narrated by: Marites "Tessbomb" Marañon
- Theme music composer: Moy Ortiz
- Opening theme: "Sis" by Sweet Plantado and Annie Quintos of The Company; "Sis" (remix) by La Diva
- Country of origin: Philippines
- Original language: Tagalog
- No. of episodes: 2,250

Production
- Executive producer: Wilma Galvante
- Producer: Louie Ignacio
- Camera setup: Multiple-camera setup
- Running time: 16–51 minutes
- Production company: GMA Entertainment TV

Original release
- Network: GMA Network
- Release: August 27, 2001 – January 1, 2010

Sis, formerly Sis: Janice & Gelli is a Philippine television talk show broadcast by GMA Network. Directed by Noel Cabacungan and Louie Ignacio, it was originally hosted by Gelli de Belen and Janice de Belen. It premiered on August 27, 2001. The show is the longest running morning talk show in Philippine television. The show concluded on January 1, 2010, with a total of 2,250 episodes. Gelli de Belen, Janice de Belen and Carmina Villarroel served as the final hosts.

The show is streaming online on YouTube.

== Hosts ==
- Gelli de Belen (2001–10)
- Janice de Belen (2001–10)
- Carmina Villarroel (2004–10)

Recurring hosts

- Marites "Tessbomb" Marañon (2001–10)
- Eva Papaya (2004–06)

Guest hosts

- Carmina Villarroel (2003–04)

== Ratings ==
According to AGB Nielsen Philippines' Mega Manila household television ratings, the final episode of Sis scored a 5.6% rating.

== Accolades ==
Accolades received by Sis
Year	Award	Category	Recipient	Result	Ref.
2001	Catholic Mass Media Awards	Best Talk Show	Sis	Nominated	
2001	15th PMPC Star Awards for Television	Best Celebrity Talk Show	Sis	Nominated	
2002	Catholic Mass Media Awards	Best Talk Show	Sis	Nominated	
2002	16th PMPC Star Awards for Television	Best Celebrity Talk Show	Sis	Nominated	
2003	Catholic Mass Media Awards	Best Talk Show	Sis	Nominated	
2003	17th PMPC Star Awards for Television	Best Celebrity Talk Show	Sis	Nominated	
2004	Catholic Mass Media Awards	Best Talk Show	Sis	Nominated	
2004	18th PMPC Star Awards for Television	Best Celebrity Talk Show	Sis	Nominated	
2005	Catholic Mass Media Awards	Best Talk Show	Sis	Nominated	
2005	Golden Screen TV Awards	Outstanding Celebrity Talk Show	Sis	Nominated	
2005	19th PMPC Star Awards for Television	Best Celebrity Talk Show	Sis	Nominated	
2006	Catholic Mass Media Awards	Best Talk Show	Sis	Nominated	
2006	20th PMPC Star Awards for Television	Best Celebrity Talk Show	Sis	Nominated	
2007	Catholic Mass Media Awards	Best Talk Show	Sis	Nominated	
2007	21st PMPC Star Awards for Television	Best Celebrity Talk Show	Sis	Won	
2007	21st PMPC Star Awards for Television	Best Celebrity Talk Show Host	Janice de Belen Gelli de Belen Carmina Villarroel	Nominated	
2008	Catholic Mass Media Awards	Best Talk Show	Sis	Nominated	
2008	22nd PMPC Star Awards for Television	Best Celebrity Talk Show	Sis	Nominated	
2008	22nd PMPC Star Awards for Television	Best Celebrity Talk Show Host	Janice de Belen Gelli de Belen Carmina Villarroel	Nominated	
2009	Catholic Mass Media Awards	Best Talk Show	Sis	Won	
2009	MTRCB TV Awards	Best Talk Show	Sis	Nominated	
2009	23rd PMPC Star Awards for Television	Best Celebrity Talk Show	Sis	Won	
2009	23rd PMPC Star Awards for Television	Best Celebrity Talk Show Host	Janice de Belen Gelli de Belen Carmina Villarroel	Nominated	
2010	24th PMPC Star Awards for Television	Best Celebrity Talk Show Host	Janice de Belen Gelli de Belen Carmina Villarroel	Nominated	
