= Ina, Kapatid, Anak (TV series) =

2012 Philippine family drama television series

- Title card
- Also known as: Her Mother's Daughter
- Genre: Family drama, Romance, Comedy, Teleserye
- Created by: ABS-CBN Studios; Rondel P. Lindayag; Reggie Amigo
- Developed by: ABS-CBN Studios; Roldeo T. Endrinal; Julie Anne R. Benitez
- Written by: Danica Mae S. Domingo; David Diuco; Mariami Tanangco-Domingo
- Directed by: Don M. Cuaresma; Jojo A. Saguin
- Creative director: Johnny delos Santos
- Starring: Kim Chiu; Maja Salvador; Xian Lim; Enchong Dee; Cherry Pie Picache; Janice de Belen; Ariel Rivera; Ronaldo Valdez; Eddie Gutierrez; Pilar Pilapil
- Music by: Carmina Cuya
- Opening theme: "Ngayon at Kailanman" by Ariel Rivera
- Composer: George Canseco
- Country of origin: Philippines
- Original languages: Filipino; English (secondary/dubbed)
- No. of seasons: 3
- No. of episodes: 178

Production
- Executive producers: Carlo L. Katigbak; Cory V. Vidanes; Laurenti Dyogi; Roldeo T. Endrinal
- Producer: Kylie Manalo-Balagtas
- Editors: Marion Bautista; Jeffrey Panlilio
- Running time: 30-45 minutes Monday - Friday at 20:30 (PST)
- Production company: Dreamscape Entertainment Television

Original release
- Network: ABS-CBN
- Release: October 8, 2012 – June 14, 2013

Ina, Kapatid, Anak (International title: Her Mother's Daughter/transl. mother, sibling, child) is a Philippine television drama family series broadcast by ABS-CBN. Directed by Don M. Cuaresma and Jojo A. Saguin, it stars Kim Chiu, Maja Salvador, Xian Lim, Enchong Dee, Cherry Pie Picache, Janice de Belen, Ariel Rivera, Ronaldo Valdez, Eddie Gutierrez and Pilar Pilapil. It aired on the network's Primetime Bida line up and worldwide on TFC from October 8, 2012 to June 14, 2013, replacing Lorenzo's Time and was replaced by Huwag Ka Lang Mawawala.

The drama follows the lives of Celyn (Kim Chiu), Margaux (Maja Salvador), Liam (Xian Lim), and Ethan (Enchong Dee) and their struggles for power, family and love.

The show was extended due to success in viewership ratings. The second season aired on January 14, 2013 with the episode featuring the grand revelation of Celyn being the daughter of Julio and Beatriz, while the third and final season debuted on March 7, 2013 featuring a new chapter focusing on the characters' young-adult stage and business rivalry.

The show also won the award for Best Drama Series in the 2013 Yahoo OMG! awards, and was nominated in the 27th PMPC Awards as Best Primetime Drama Series of 2013.

The drama was the last female-headlined local series to rank as the highest-rated program on Philippine television in the pre-COVID pandemic era, when it held the top spot from June 14, 2013 until after the 2016-2020 duration of Ang Probinsyano, which originally ran from 2015 to 2022, took over the same position in the national ratings.

== Plot ==
Celyn Buenaventura (Kim Chiu) is an ambitious, kindhearted working-class girl living in Cebu with her widowed mother, Theresa Apolinario (Cherry Pie Picache). When she receives an acceptance letter from the University of the Philippines Diliman, Theresa is furious and forbids her to go. Defying her mother, Celyn travels alone to Manila, enrolls at the university, and finds work at a carinderia, where the owner lets her sleep in the eatery.

On the first day of school, Celyn meets Margaux Marasigan (Maja Salvador), the adoptive daughter of Julio (Ariel Rivera) and Beatrice Marasigan (Janice de Belen), who are wealthy owners of the chic Memorata shoe company. Margaux lives a privileged life, which Celyn has long admired from afar. Celyn also meets Ethan Castillo (Enchong Dee) and Liam Lagdameo (Xian Lim), Margaux's childhood friends. Celyn and Liam clash at first, and she secretly harbors a crush on Ethan, who once saved her life as a child. Celyn and Margaux quickly become best friends and study-buddies. When Celyn discovers that Ethan and Margaux are secretly dating, they convince her to pose as Ethan's girlfriend to continue seeing each other.

Margaux chafes under Beatrice’s strict rules, hiding her relationship with Ethan using the ruse he is dating Celyn because her family disapproves of him. Matters worsen when Ethan’s father goes into hiding after Margaux’s grandfather, Lucas Elizalde (Eddie Gutierrez), accuses him of embezzling money from his company. This causes Ethan's family to become shunned at the country club and his mother, Lulu (Mickey Ferriols), suffers a mental breakdown, but Liam's family continues to offer them support. Meanwhile, Celyn learns that Liam has long been in love with Margaux, even though it is unrequited and Ethan is his best friend. When Liam discovers Celyn also has feelings for Ethan, they begin to understand each other better and agree to keep each other’s secrets.

Beatrice initially dislikes Celyn, believing she is a bad influence on Margaux, but Julio defends her until Beatrice gradually tolerates her. Theresa meanwhile decides to move to Manila with her father, Zacharias (Ronaldo Valdez) and cousin, Oscar (Jayson Gainza), in order to be closer to Celyn. Julio eventually encounters and confronts Theresa, demanding to know where she took his real biological child. Though Theresa tries to hide the truth and prevent Celyn from interacting with the Marasigans, Julio and Celyn have already met.

When Margaux and Ethan attempt to elope, Beatrice thwarts them after Celyn is pressured to reveal their plan. Margaux, already hurt after overhearing Celyn confess her crush for Ethan, feels betrayed and begins a bitter feud with her. Ethan, rejected by Margaux in favor of her family, grows closer to Celyn and begins having feelings for her. Margaux turns to Liam for comfort but resents his constant defense of Celyn, as he tries to keep the peace among all of them. Celyn is hurt by how Margaux treats her and refusal to fix their friendship.

Beatrice, revealed to be Theresa’s maternal half-sister through their mother Yolanda (Pilar Pilapil), discovers Julio and Theresa have been meeting. Furious, she confronts Theresa. Julio then shocks Celyn by revealing she is his and Beatrice’s missing biological daughter. After a DNA test confirms the truth, Beatrice tearfully regrets mistreating Celyn when they had first met, and is determined to make up for lost time with her long-lost daughter.

Arguments and legal threats over custody follow, but a compromise is reached where Celyn will stay with Beatrice during the week and with Theresa on weekends. After graduation, Celyn and Margaux’s rivalry intensifies. Celyn rises to vice president of Memorata, fueling Margaux’s determination to outdo her. Margaux pursues her love for Liam and craves for his company, while Celyn forgives Ethan after a dispute during their graduation. Celyn remains angered at Liam, while Liam confesses he too has feelings to Celyn. A jealous Margaux then tries to win Liam back.

Theresa's cousin, Oscar, has flashbacks of Theresa's pregnancy which unravels the truth. After years of struggling to have a child, Beatrice and Julio conceive via in-vitro fertilization and convince Theresa to carry their baby to term as a surrogate. Theresa reneges on their agreement after an argument with Beatrice regarding a suspected affair with Julio, as well as the rekindling of Theresa's traumatic memories from previously losing a child. When Theresa unexpectedly gives birth to twin girls, Oscar takes the more sickly child and gives her to Beatrice as promised, knowing she will ensure the baby grows healthy. Meanwhile the other baby girl remains to be raised by Theresa, who lost consciousness after labor and is unaware she gave birth to twins. Oscar pays off the midwife and keeps everything a secret until he finally confesses that Celyn and Margaux are indeed the twin babies carried and delivered by Theresa. Zacharias admits orchestrating the twins' separation to keep peace between the two half sisters, Beatrice and Theresa. Though Margaux’s resentment lingers, she accepts that she and Celyn are family.

Theresa’s supposedly dead husband, Mio Buenaventura (John Regala), resurfaces seeking revenge. He shoots Julio, leaving him in a coma. While keeping vigil over their father in the hospital, Celyn and Margaux finally reconcile. Julio wakes up and is discharged after recovering. Mio meanwhile continues to threaten Theresa and Beatrice’s family. Theresa eventually discovers that Ethan's friend, Diego Medina (Alex Medina) is Joshua, her long-lost firstborn whom Mio had spirited away years earlier. Driven by guilt and grief, Theresa tries to win Diego back.

Celyn and Ethan investigate Mio's house, trying to find evidence confirming their theory of a link between him and Diego. Mio catches them and allows Ethan to escape while holding Celyn hostage. Mio demands an exorbitant ransom from Lucas, Beatrice's father, who was Mio's employer and thus the true mastermind of all their crimes. Lucas, who wants Mio dead lest he be implicated, agrees and sends him the money through Theresa.

During the rescue operation policemen shoot Mio, while Diego escapes, taking Celyn with him to an abandoned kitchen. Panicking once cornered, Diego accidentally causes an explosion and fire. Margaux attempts to save Celyn from the flames, but both are eventually rescued by Liam. After Mio is captured, he is placed under hospital arrest. Lucas arranges for Mio's escape attempt when Diego blackmails him. After having a happy reunion, Liam proposes to Celyn, which she accepts. They all then learn that Mio has escaped, and he targets Theresa again, stabbing Liam three times, before disappearing once more. A panicked Beatrice then plans to flee to Singapore for her family's safety. She and Theresa finally reconcile with one another, amidst hugs and tears.

Margaux, Theresa, Celyn and Beatrice are then kidnapped by Mio and Diego. Lucas, who has gone into hiding with the two men after being exposed, sees Beatrice and remorsefully texts Yolanda their daughter's location. When police arrive, Mio orders Diego to shoot his own mother, but racked by his conscience he refuses. Angered, Mio tries to wrest the gun from Diego, and after a struggle pulls the trigger, shooting his son before a distraught Theresa. Diego asks his mother to forgive him and dies, plunging Mio into grief for killing his own son. Theresa manages to flee with the others, but Mio corners them. In a final confrontation, Mio is about to shoot Theresa when Julio arrives and shoots him instead. They all embrace while Ethan and Liam run to meet them, but Mio stirs one last time and seriously wounds Theresa before being killed by police.

Theresa survives, and the family finally finds peace. Celyn and Margaux forgive their estranged cousin Diego/Joshua at his grave. Both women marry— Celyn with Liam, Margaux with Ethan. Lucas is shown in prison being visited by Yolanda, who forgives him for what he did. Celyn and Margaux eventually become pregnant, with Liam and Ethan by their sides. Celyn goes into labor, and is take to hospital by Liam, accompanied by Ethan and Margaux, who also goes into labor the same day. In the final scenes, the entire extended family are in church for the baptism of Celyn and Margaux's babies, who hold hands whilst held in their mothers' arms.

== Cast and characters ==
Cast

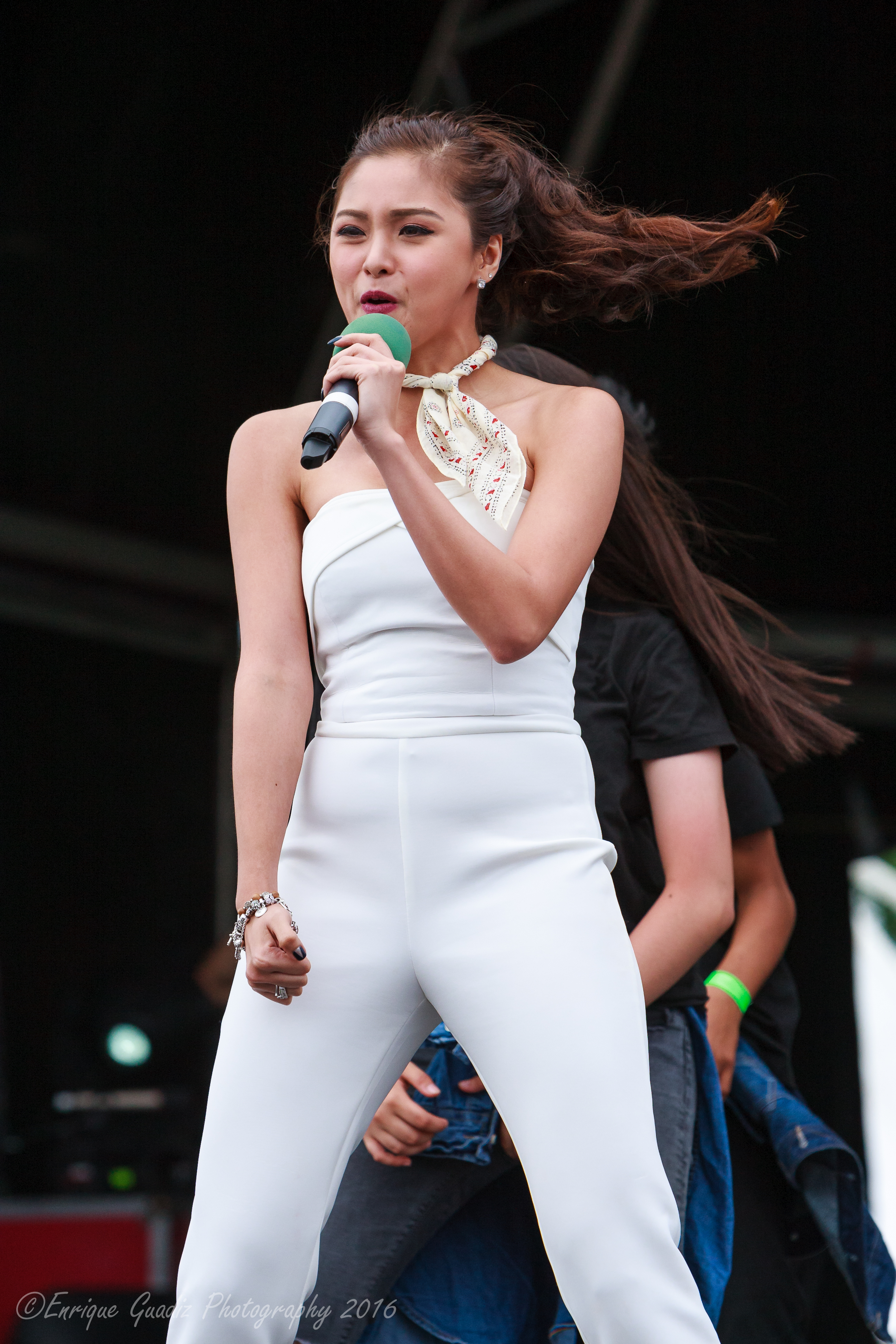
Kim Chiu

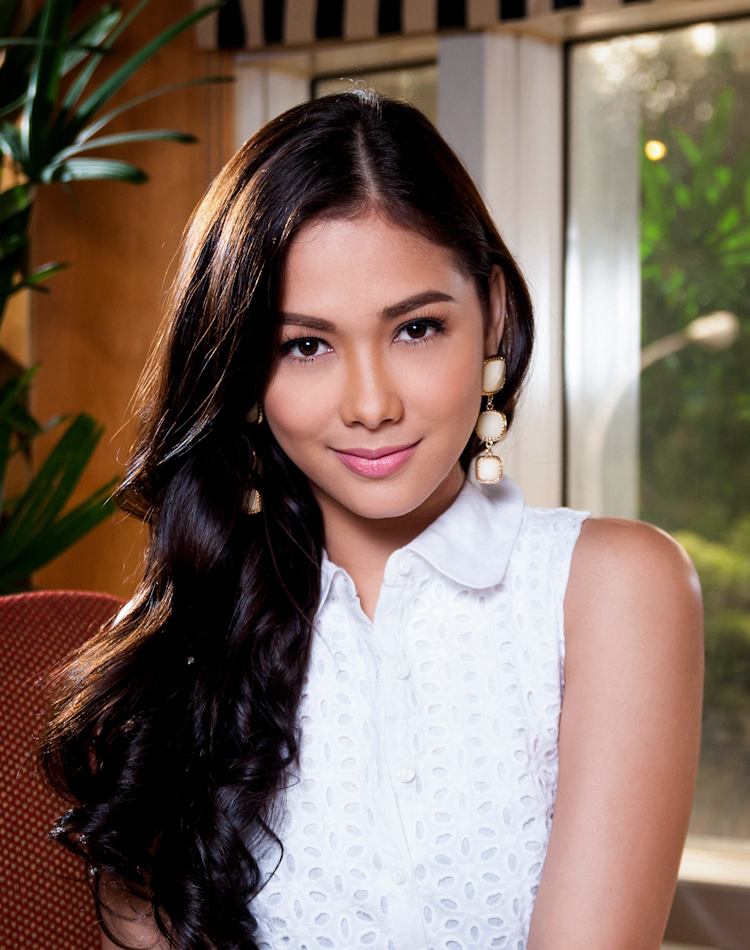
Maja Salvador

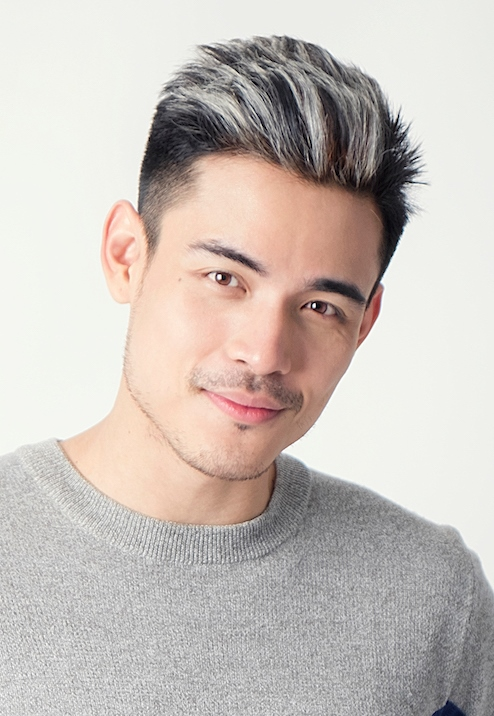
Xian Lim

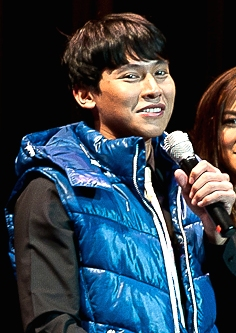
Enchong Dee

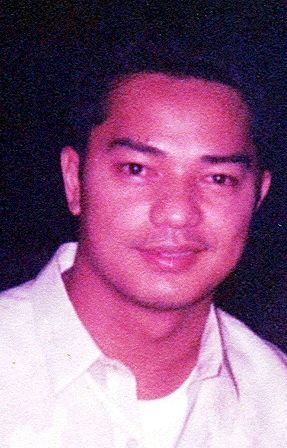
Ariel Rivera

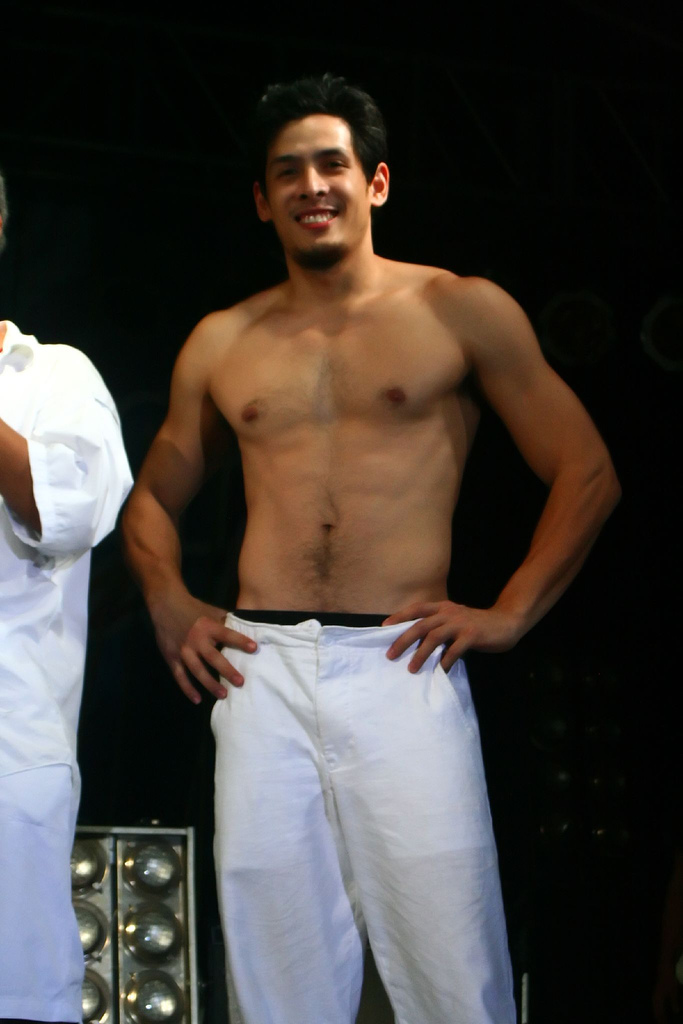
Christian Vasquez

=== Main cast ===
- Kim Chiu as Celyn A. Buenaventura / Celyn E. Marasigan-Lagdameo
- Maja Salvador as Margaux E. Marasigan-Castillo
- Xian Lim as William "Liam" Lagdameo
- Enchong Dee as Ethan Castillo
- Janice de Belen as Beatrice C. Elizalde-Marasigan
- Cherry Pie Picache as Theresa C. Apolinario-Buenaventura
- Ariel Rivera as Julio Marasigan
- Ronaldo Valdez as Zacharias "Zach" Apolinario
- Eddie Gutierrez as Lucas Elizalde
- Pilar Pilapil as Yolanda Cruz-Elizalde

=== Supporting cast ===
- John Regala as Emilio "Mio" Buenaventura
- Mickey Ferriols as Lourdes "Lulu" Castillo
- Christian Vasquez as Antonio Lagdameo, Sr.
- Jayson Gainza as Oscar Apolinario
- Francine Prieto as Martina Lagdameo
- Clarence Delgado as Ivan Lagdameo
- Alex Medina as Diego Medina / Joshua A. Buenaventura
- Slater Young as Antonio Lagdameo, Jr.
- Mike Austria as Aurelio Castillo
- Rufami as Aliyah
- Greggy Santos as Badong

=== Guest cast ===
- Marie Joy Dalo as Fiona Ortega / Rita Daniela
- John Cando as Joel
- Petite as Tiny
- Andrea Brillantes as young Celyn
- Angela Evangelista as young Margaux
- Jerome Michael "JM" Briones as young Liam
- Ricky Castro as young Ethan
- Khaycee Aboloc as young Aliyah
- Cajo Gomez as young Diego/Joshua
- Jairus Aquino as young Oscar

== Production ==
=== Concept ===
Ina, Kapatid, Anak is a family drama directed by Don Cuaresma and Jojo Saguin of the fantasy drama, 100 Days to Heaven and written by Danica Domingo of the critically acclaimed melodrama, Tayong Dalawa. The story conference was held on May 11, 2012 where it was officially green-lit for production. The idea of the concept came from the success of previous ABS-CBN dramas, namely Iisa Pa Lamang and Magkaribal which both focused on characters of the high society.

=== Casting ===
According to several reports made earlier by the management, the drama was supposed to be Andi Eigenmann's comeback project as an actress after her pregnancy, she was to star opposite Jessy Mendiola. During the course of pre-production, Eigenmann and Mendiola were offered separate projects by the network, Andi with Kahit Puso'y Masugatan and Mendiola with Paraiso, which they both accepted causing them to back out of the project. Meanwhile, Enchong Dee remained part of the series as Ethan, as originally planned, although the roles previously given to Martin del Rosario and Joseph Marco were offered elsewhere. After so much delay in production, ABS-CBN tapped Maja Salvador and Rayver Cruz to play the roles previously given to Mendiola and Joseph Marco, however during filming, the production crew left out Cruz's character as they felt that his character was no longer needed. Meanwhile, Kim Chiu and Xian Lim replaced Eigenmann and Del Rosario in the final casting of characters.

The series marks the reunion of Chiu and Lim as a tandem and Chiu and Salvador as rivals after the highly successful romantic comedy, My Binondo Girl which actress Cherry Pie Picache was also a part of, marking the third time Picache and Chiu worked together in one project. It is also Chiu's reunion with Dee and veteran actor Ronaldo Valdez who she once worked with in the Philippine adaptation of the South Korean drama, My Girl. Meanwhile, the drama is Dee and Salvador's first on-screen team up.

== Reception ==
=== Ratings ===
Ina Kapatid Anak is one of the top rating shows of 2013. On February 21, 2013, the family drama posted an all-time high rating of 40.4%. Its finale episode, which aired on June 14, 2013, registered a whooping 42.9% national rating based on Kantar Media which shattered its previous all-time high ratings record.

Kantar Media National TV Ratings (8:30-9:15PM PST)
Pilot Episode	Finale Episode	Peak	Average
25.8% October 8, 2012	42.9% June 14, 2013	42.9% June 14, 2013	30.3% (2012); 33.4% (2013)

=== Controversies ===
==== Cruze airbag controversy ====
Some viewers of the episode where Celyn and Margaux figure in a car accident were surprised that the airbags of the Chevrolet Cruze used in the scene did not deploy, despite the damage to the car depicted. People took their observations to Twitter, and concerned motorists wrote to Chevrolet regarding the car's airbag deployment mechanism. The automobile manufacturer issued a statement, reminding the public that they were watching a fictional series that did not depict a real event, and called for such programmes to present factuality on technical matters. A regular cast member of Ina, Kapatid, Anak had to apologise over the issue on behalf of the staff, the writers and ABS-CBN.

== Soundtrack ==
The songs used in the series was released as a soundtrack album in 2012 entitled Ina, Kapatid, Anak (Original Soundtrack). The soundtrack album was released through Star Music.

== International broadcast ==
The show aired in Tanzania on Star TV.

== See also ==
- List of programs broadcast by ABS-CBN
- List of ABS-CBN Studios original drama series
