= Carmina Villarroel =

Filipino actress (born 1975)

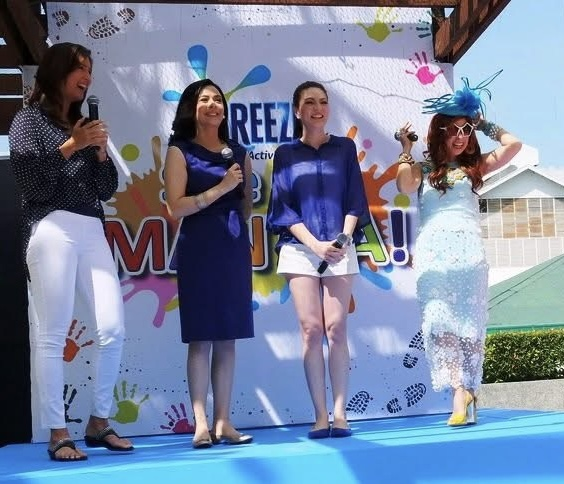
- Villarroel (third from the left) in 2013
- Born: María Carmina Muñiz Villarroel; August 17, 1975 (age 51); Santa Cruz, Laguna, Philippines
- Occupations: Actress; television presenter
- Years active: 1986–present
- Agent: Freelancer (1986–present)
- Spouses: Rustom Padilla (m. 1994; ann. 2002); Zoren Legaspi (m. 2012)
- Children: Mavy; Cassy

María Carmina Muñiz Villarroel-Legaspi (Tagalog: [mɐˈɾiː.ɐ kaɾˈmi.nɐ mʊˈɲis biljɐɾɔˈɛl lɛˈɣaspɪ]; Spanish: [maˈɾi.a kaɾˈmi.na muˈɲis bi.ʎa.roˈel leˈɣ̞as.pi]; born August 17, 1975) is a Filipino actress, television presenter, and product endorser. She is best known for portraying the role of Lyneth Santos in the medical drama, Abot-Kamay na Pangarap, as well as portraying Cynthia in Esperanza, Emily in Pahiram ng Isang Ina, Lucille in Doble Kara, George in Oki Doki Doc, Elizabeth in Abangan Ang Susunod Na Kabanata, Barbara in Widows' Web, Roselle in Hating Kapatid and as one of the hosts of SiS and Sarap, 'Di Ba?.

== Personal life ==
Villarroel started her relationship Rustom Padilla on June 24, 1992. They married in 1994; the two had no children, and Villarroel filed for annulment several years after, which was granted in 2002.

Villarroel started her relationship Zoren Legaspi in 2000. They married on November 15, 2012. the couple had twins on January 6, 2001, in the United States. Legaspi planned a surprise proposal and civil wedding with the help of their families and the network. The ceremony was later aired the following Saturday as the television special Zoren-Carmina: Always Forever, A Wedding Like No Other. The idea of a surprise proposal followed by a flashmob-style instant wedding was inspired by a remarkably similar episode of the U.S. television programme Mobbed, hosted by Howie Mandel.

== Filmography ==
=== Film ===
Year	Title	Role	Ref.
1987	Pinulot ka Lang sa Lupa	young Angeli	
1987	Kapag Puso ang Naghari	Unknown	
1988	Bobo Cop	Unknown	
1988	Tiyanak	Monica	
1988	Good Morning, Titser	Unknown	
1988	Babaing Hampaslupa	Fe	
1989	Magic to Love	Carmina	
1989	Balbakwa	Unknown	
1989	Limang Daliri ng Diyos	Unknown	
1989	Isang Araw Walang Diyos	Kelly	
1989	SuperMouse and the Robo-Rats	Juliet	
1989	Student Body	Mina	
1989	Last Two Minutes	Tricia	
1989	Regal Shocker: The Movie	Lara	
1990	Dyesebel	Young Dyesebel	
1990	Tora Tora, Bang Bang Bang	Unknown	
1990	Kapag Langit ang Humatol	Bernadette	
1990	Lovers' Delight	Unknown	
1990	Shake, Rattle & Roll II	Tiffany	
1991	Kailan Ka Magiging Akin	Tess	
1991	Under Age Too	young Carmina	
1991	The Secrets of Pura		
1991	Anak ni Janice		
1992	Iisa Pa Lamang	Cynthia	
1992	Guwapings: The First Adventure		
1992	Hanggang May Buhay	Joy	
1992	Yakapin Mo Akong Muli	Unknown	
1992	Buddy en Sol: Praybeyr Depektibs	Unknown	
1993	Ligaw-Ligawan, Kasal-Kasalan, Bahay-Bahayan	Roselle Batibot	
1993	Hindi Kita Malilimutan	Rowena	
1993	Bulag, Pipi at Bingi	Unknown	
1993	Makati Ave. (Office Girls)	Unknown	
1994	Wating	Rosel	
1994	Hindi Magbabago	Lisa	
1996	Oki Doki Doc: The Movie	George	
1996	Bayarang Puso	Christine Sanvictores	
1996	Maruja	Maruja Isabel	
1996	Maginoong Barumbado	Carmela	
1996	Awit ni Cecilia	Ms. Sibulo	
1997	Ipaglaban Mo! The Movie	Belen	
1997	Atraso: Ang Taong May Kasalanan	Cecilia Tiangco	
1998	Buhawi Jack	Vera	
1998	Kahit Mabuhay Kang Muli	Gel	
1998	Ang Erpat Kong Astig	Celia	
1999	Sumigaw Ka Hanggang Gusto Mo	Unknown	
1999	Lalaban Ako Hanggang Sa Huling Hininga	Unknown	
1999	Esperanza: The Movie	Atty. Cynthia Salazar	
2000	Minsan, Minahal Kita	Jackie	
2000	Minsan Ko Lang Sasabihin	Monique	
2001	Super Idol	Jenny	
2002	Cass & Cary: Who Wants To Be a Millionaire?	Michelle	
2003	Mano Po 2: My Home	Janet	
2005	Mulawin: The Movie	Salimbay	
2006	Tulay	Unknown	
2010	Shake, Rattle and Roll 12	Head nurse	
2011	The Road	Carmela	
2012	One More Try	Dra. Diesta	
2015	Everyday I Love You	Gina	
2017	Love You to the Stars and Back	Michelle	
2019	Wild Little Love	Cristina	
2019	Sunod	Olivia	
2020	Four Sisters Before The Wedding	Grace Salazar	
2024	Road Trip	Chiqui	
2025	Kontrabida Academy	Betty	
2025	Rekonek		

=== Television ===
Year	Title	Role	Ref.
1986–1996	That's Entertainment	Herself (co-host) / Also Performer (Appeared on Monday episodes)	
1987–1994	Palibhasa Lalake	Catherine / Cathy	
1988	Chika Chika Chicks	Leslie (guest)	
1988–1991	Tonight With Dick & Carmi	Herself (Co-Host)	
1989	The Maricel Drama Special: Boardmates		
1989–1995	Okay Ka, Fairy Ko!	Herself (guest)	
1989–1998	Eat Bulaga!	Herself (co-host)	
1989–1991	13, 14, 15	Herself	
1991	Maalaala Mo Kaya: Sanggol	Corazon	
1991–1992	Abangan ang Susunod Na Kabanata	Elizabeth Delos Santos	
1992	Maalaala Mo Kaya: Helmet	Patty	
1992	Petabisyon: Hindi Tayo Magkabagay		
1992–1997	Ready, Get Set, Go!	Herself (host)	
1993	The Maricel Drama Special: Welcome Home Gwen	Gwen	
1993	Buddy en Sol: Let's Go Physical Exams	Herself (Guest)	
1993	Maalaala Mo Kaya: Music Box		
1994–1998	Tropang Trumpo	Herself (co-host)	
1994	Telesine Specials: Perfect		
1994	Star Drama Theater Presents: Carmina	Various Roles in 13 Episodes	
1995	Calvento Files: Oroquieta Massacre		
1995	Maalaala Mo Kaya: Panyo	Rosita	
1995–1998	Oki Doki Doc	George	
1996	Telesine Specials: Hacienda del Cielo		
1996	Maalaala Mo Kaya: Dibuho	Cynthia	
1997	Telesine Specials: Hiwaga sa Bula		
1997	Telesine Specials: Dementia		
1997	Telesine Specials: Inaanod na Liwanag		
1997	Star Drama Theater Presents: Camille	Episode Guest: Ang Daya Mo	
1997	Maalaala Mo Kaya: Wedding Vow	Aileen	
1997	Maalaala Mo Kaya: Alak	Agnes	
1997–1998	'Sang Linggo nAPO Sila	Herself (co-host)	
1998	Ganyan Kita Kamahal	Eloisa Espiritu	
1998	Telesine Specials: A Circle With Friends		
1998	Telesine Specials: Karugtong ng Buhay		
1998	Telesine Specials: Pasya ng Puso		
1998–1999	Halik sa Apoy	Atty. Alyssa Lambino / Celine	
1999	Telesine Specials: Multo		
1999	Esperanza	Atty. Cynthia Salazar / Rosella Panganiban-Salgado	
1999	Maalaala Mo Kaya: Stethoscope	Andrea	
1999	Maalaala Mo Kaya: Taxi		
1999	Maalaala Mo Kaya: Regalo		
1999	Esep-Esep	Herself (co-host)	
1999–2001	!Oka Tokat	Carmela de Dios	
2000	Maalaala Mo Kaya: Abito		
2001	Maalaala Mo Kaya: Condo Unit		
2001–2003	Recuerdo de Amor	Luisa Arellano / Rebecca Stuart	
2002–2003	Morning Girls with Kris and Korina	Herself (co-host)	
2002	Maalaala Mo Kaya: Scented Candles		
2002	Wansapanataym: Pambihirang Vampira	Vernie	
2003	Maalaala Mo Kaya: Make-Up		
2003	Nuts Entertainment	Herself (co-host)	
2003–2004	Narito ang Puso Ko	Ava Grande	
2004–2010	SiS	Herself (co-host)	
2004	Mulawin	Ina	
2004	Kakabakaba Adventures	Unknown	
2005	Darna	Sabrina / Sulfura	
2005–2011	Day Off	Herself/host	
2006	Majika	Ayessa	
2007	Princess Charming	Mabel de Saavedra	
2007	Mga Mata ni Anghelita	Cristina Manresa	
2007–2008	Marimar	Dra. Rhia Concepcion	
2008	Codename: Asero	Lady Q / Sandy	
2009	Maalaala Mo Kaya: Reseta	Judith	
2009	Sana Ngayong Pasko	young Remedios Dionisio	
2010	The Last Prince	Reyna Lamara	
2010	Claudine: Baby Maker	Rowena	
2010–2011	Pepito Manaloto	Maricar Del Valle	
2010–2011	Love ni Mister, Love ni Misis	Herself (host)	
2011	Amazing Cooking Kids	Herself (host)	
2011	Pahiram ng Isang Ina	Emily Martinez	
2012–2013	Showbiz Inside Report	Herself (co-host)	
2012	Gandang Gabi Vice	Herself (guest)	
2012	Lorenzo's Time	Kathy Gonzales-Montereal	
2012	Toda Max	Chef Mina	
2012	Zoren-Carmina Always Forever, A wedding Like No Other	Herself	
2012	Wansapanataym: The Perfect Gift	Joanna	
2013	May Isang Pangarap	Vanessa Francisco	
2013–2014	Got to Believe	Juliana San Juan-Manansala	
2014	The Ryzza Mae Show	Herself (guest)	
2014	Maalaala Mo Kaya: Sanggol	Dina	
2014	Wansapanataym: Nato de Coco	Liezel	
2015	Bridges of Love	Alexa Meyers Antonio	
2015–2017	Doble Kara	Lucille Acosta-Dela Rosa	
2016–2017	Till I Met You	Cassandra "Cass" Bermudo-Duico	
2017	Road Trip	Herself (guest)	
2017	Eat Bulaga!	Herself (guest judge)	
2017	Dear Uge	Weng	
2017	Super Ma'am	Ceres	
2017–2018	Kambal, Karibal	Geraldine Enriquez	
2018–2024	Sarap, 'Di Ba?	Herself (host)	
2019	Kara Mia	Aya Machado-Lacson	
2021	Babawiin Ko ang Lahat	Dulce Espejo	
2021–2022	Stories from the Heart: The End of Us	Maggie Corpuz	
2022	Widows' Web	Barbara Sagrado-Dee	
2022–2024	Abot-Kamay na Pangarap	Lyneth Santos-Benitez / Lyneth Santos-Tanyag	
2024	TiktoClock	Herself (Guest)	
2024	Widows' War	Barbara "Barry" Sagrado-Dee	
2025–2026	Hating Kapatid	Roselle Dizon-Pascual	
2026	The Loyalty Game	Imelda Madrigal	

== Awards and nominations ==
Year	Work	Award	Category	Result	Ref.
1991	Kapag Langit Ang Humatol	Gawad Urian Award	Best Supporting Actress	Nominated	
1995	Wating	Young Critics Circle	Best Performance by Male or Female, Adult or Child, Individual or Ensemble in Leading or Supporting Role (Female, Adult, Individual)	Nominated	
1995	Wating	Gawad Urian Award	Gawad Urian for Best Actress	Nominated	
1997	Bayarang Puso	FAMAS Award	FAMAS Award for Best Supporting Actress	Won	
2009	Maalaala Mo Kaya: "Reseta"	23rd PMPC Star Awards for Television	Best Single Performance by an Actress	Won	
—N/a	Day Off	PMPC Star Awards for Television	Best Reality Program	Won	
—N/a	SiS	PMPC Star Awards for Television	Best Celebrity Talk Show	Won	
2012	The Road	60th FAMAS Awards	FAMAS Award for Best Supporting Actress	Nominated	
2013	One More Try	61st FAMAS Awards	FAMAS Award for Best Supporting Actress	Nominated	
2013	Showbiz Inside Report	Golden Screen Award	Outstanding Female Showbiz Talk Program Host	Nominated	
2014	Showbiz Inside Report	Golden Screen Award	Outstanding Female Showbiz Talk Program Host	Nominated	
2016	Doble Kara	30th PMPC Star Awards for Television	Best Drama Supporting Actress	Nominated	
2017	Till I Met You	31st PMPC Star Awards for Television	Best Drama Supporting Actress	Nominated	
2023	Abot-Kamay na Pangarap	12th Northwest Samar State University Students' Choice Awards for Radio and Television	Best Supporting Actress in Daytime Series	Won	
