= Shake, Rattle & Roll (film series) =

Filipino horror anthology film series

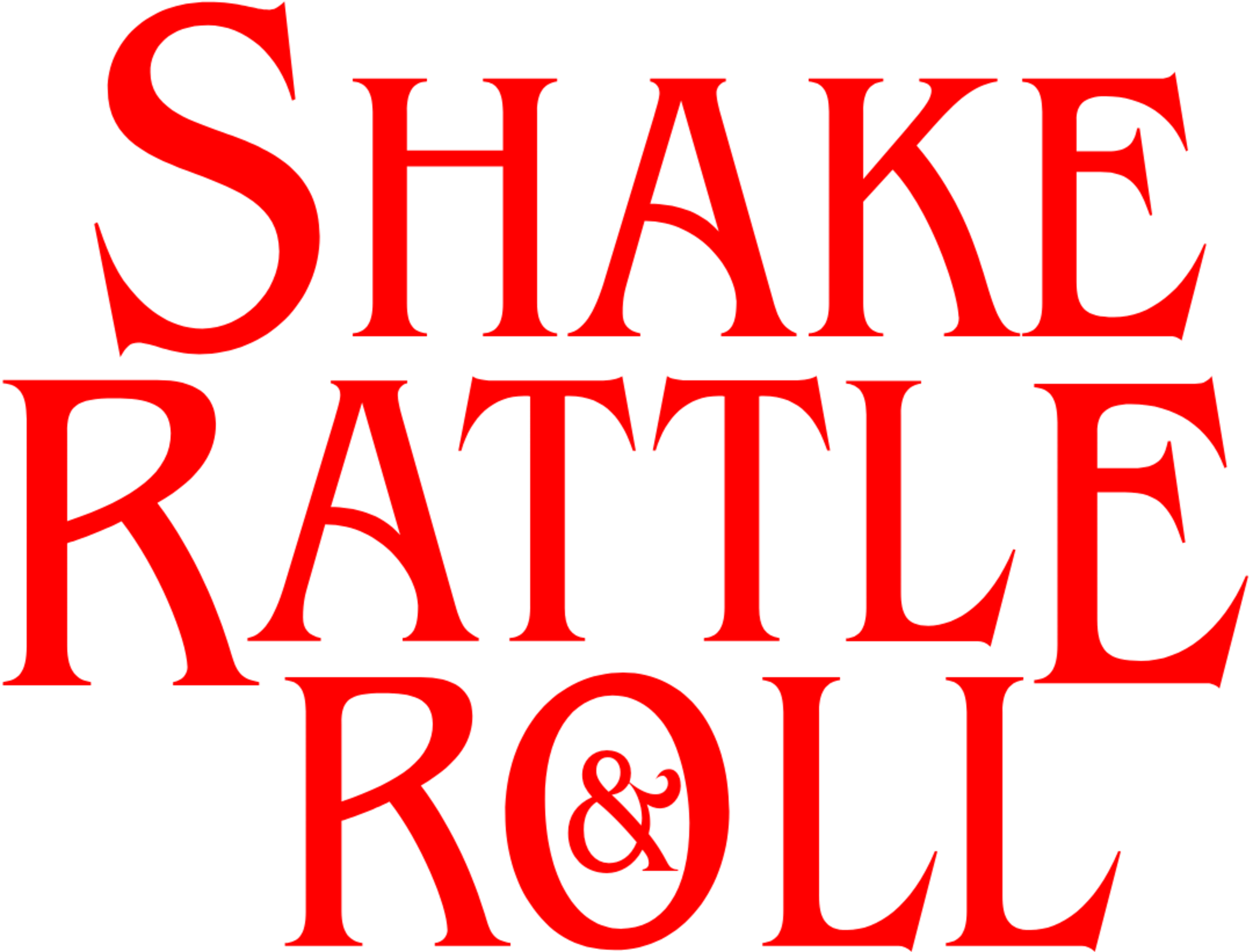
- Official franchise logo
- Produced by: Athena Productions (1984); Regal Entertainment (1990–present)
- Production companies: Athena Productions; Regal Entertainment; Regal Multimedia Inc. (Note: The remaining films were co-produced with Good Harvest Unlimited (1991), MAQ Productions Inc. (1997), Reality Entertainment, and Ignite Media (2005).)
- Distributed by: Regal Films Distribution; ABS-CBN Films (Note: Distributes the digitally enhanced version of the first film restored by the ABS-CBN Film Restoration Project.)
- Country: Philippines
- Language: Filipino

Shake, Rattle & Roll (SRR) is a Filipino horror anthology film series produced by Regal Entertainment. It is the longest-running film series in the Philippines, having begun in 1984. The series consists of seventeen films, each featuring three segments that follow characters encountering creatures from Philippine mythology and other beings. With the exception of the sixth and sixteenth installments, which premiered in January 1997 and November 2023, respectively, all entries were official selections of the Metro Manila Film Festival. The title of the series was derived from the song of the same name.

The first installment was released under the defunct Athena Productions, while all the succeeding installments are produced by Regal Entertainment.

As of 2026, there are currently seventeen installments of the film series, with the latest installment, Shake, Rattle & Roll: Evil Origins, released on December 25, 2025.

== Overview ==
The films draw from Philippine mythology, incorporating supernatural creatures and beliefs into their stories. These include the aswang, engkanto, tiyanak, and other figures associated with Filipino folklore, as well as themes involving superstitions, urban legends, and spirit possession.

The series occasionally incorporates comedic elements while maintaining its primary focus on horror. Several installments (notably the fifth, eighth, fourteenth, fifteenth, and seventeenth films) feature interconnected storylines that suggest some of their segments are set within a shared universe.

Some segments have been interpreted as social commentary on aspects of Filipino society, including political and economic issues. For example, the "Rain Rain Go Away" segment from the thirteenth film addresses issues through its depiction of flood victims. Although most segments are set during the Christmas season to coincide with the films' traditional holiday release during the Metro Manila Film Festival, only the "Christmas Tree" segment from the ninth film directly centers on Christmas.

== History ==
The first Shake, Rattle & Roll film was developed by Athena Productions, founded by film producer and talent manager Douglas Quijano, and released in 1984. The anthology format consisted of three separate stories directed by Emmanuel Borlaza, Ishmael Bernal, and Peque Gallaga.

Following the success of the original film, Regal Films acquired the rights to the franchise and produced the second film in 1990. The succeeding installments retained the three-segment anthology format and were primarily released during the Metro Manila Film Festival.

== Films ==
No.	Year	Segments		
I	1984	Baso (lit. 'Glass')	Pridyider (lit. 'Fridge')	Manananggal (lit. 'Remover')
I	1984	Director: Emmanuel H. Borlaza	Director: Ishmael Bernal	Director: Peque Gallaga
I	1984	Writer: Jose N. Carreon	Writer: Amado Lacuesta Jr.	Writer: Uro dela Cruz
I	1984	Cast: Joel Torre, Rey "PJ" Abellana, Arlene Muhlach, Rosemarie Gil, Tony Carreon	Cast: Janice de Belen, Charito Solis, William Martinez, Lito Gruet, Emily Loren, Mon Alvir	Cast: Herbert Bautista, Irma Alegre, Mary Walter, Peewee Quijano, Pen Medina
II	1990	Multo (lit. 'Ghost')	Kulam (lit. 'Witch')	Aswang
II	1990	Directors: Peque Gallaga, Lore Reyes		
II	1990	Writers: Peque Gallaga, Lore Reyes, Don Escudero		
II	1990	Cast: Janice de Belen, Eric Quizon, Eddie Gutierrez, Isabel Granada, Caridad Sanchez	Cast: Joey Marquez, Daisy Romualdez, Carmina Villarroel, Sylvia Sanchez, Lotlot de Leon	Cast: Manilyn Reynes, Ana Roces, Aljon Jimenez, Anjo Yllana, Richard Gomez, Vangie Labalan, Rez Cortez
III	1991	Yaya (lit. 'Nanny')	Ate (lit. 'Sister')	Nanay (lit. 'Mother')
III	1991	Directors: Peque Gallaga, Lore Reyes		
III	1991	Writers: Jerry Lopez-Sineneng, Lore Reyes, Peque Gallaga		Writers: Dwight Gaston, Peque Gallaga
III	1991	Cast: Kris Aquino, Lilia Cuntapay, Ogie Alcasid, Mae-Ann Adonis, Rosemarie Gil	Cast: Janice de Belen, Gina Alajar, Subas Herrero, Armida Siguion-Reyna, Cris da Luz, Pen Medina, Inday Badiday, Joel Torre, Lucy Quinto, Christopher Balase	Cast: Manilyn Reynes, Ai-Ai delas Alas, Joey Marquez, Ricardo Cepeda, Vangie Labalan, Candy Pangilinan, Jinky Laurel, Agnes Ventura, Roxanne Silverio, Giselle Sanchez, Richard Arellano, Rick Halal, Marlene Aguilar
IV	1992	Ang Guro (lit. 'The Teacher')	Ang Kapitbahay (lit. 'The Neighbor')	Ang Madre (lit. 'The Nun')
IV	1992	Directors: Peque Gallaga, Lore Reyes		
IV	1992	Writer: Lore Reyes	Writer: Peque Gallaga	
IV	1992	Cast: Manilyn Reynes, Edu Manzano, Sunshine Cruz, Aljon Jimenez, Nida Blanca	Cast: Aiza Seguerra, Janice de Belen, Al Tantay, Rene Hinojales, Lady Lee	Cast: Gina Alajar, Aiko Melendez, Miguel Rodriguez, Ai-Ai delas Alas, IC Mendoza, Bella Flores, Lilia Cuntapay
V	1994	Maligno	Anino (lit. 'Shadow')	Impakto
V	1994	Director: Don Escudero	Director: Jose Javier Reyes	Director: Manny Castañeda
V	1994	Writer: Jose Javier Reyes		
V	1994	Cast: Ruffa Gutierrez, Monsour del Rosario, Bong Regala, Angel Confiado, Rustica Carpio, Aida Carmona	Cast: Sheryl Cruz, Jacklyn Jose, Dingdong Dantes, Ogie Diaz, Patrick Riego De Dios, Ana Abad Santos, Eva Darren, Len Ag-Santos, George Lim, Cherry Cornell, Oscar Moran	Cast: Manilyn Reynes, Tom Taus, Chuck Perez, Don Pepot, Michelle Ortega, Archie Adamos, Nonong de Andres, Lilia Cuntapay, Romy Romulo
VI	1997	Ang Telebisyon (lit. 'The Television')	Ang Tulay (lit. 'The Bridge')	Ang Buwan (lit. 'The Moon')
VI	1997	Director: Maurice Carvajal	Director: Frank G. Rivera	Director: Anton Juan
VI	1997	Writer: Tony Perez		
VI	1997	Cast: Camille Prats, Joanne Quintas, Kiko Villanueva, Dan Pacia, John Apacible	Cast: Aiza Seguerra, Ara Mina, Matet de Leon, Tom Taus	Cast: Tonton Gutierrez, Georgia Ortega, Roy Alvarez, Raymond Keannu, John Apacible, Mon Confiado
VII (2k5)	2005	Poso (lit. 'Water Pump')	Aquarium	Lihim ng San Joaquin (lit. 'Secret of San Joaquin')
VII (2k5)	2005	Director: Uro dela Cruz	Director: Rico Maria Ilarde	Director: Richard V. Somes
VII (2k5)	2005	Writer: Dondon Monteverde	Writer: Aloy Adlawan	Writer: Joven Tan
VII (2k5)	2005	Cast: Ai-Ai delas Alas, Gloria Romero, Rainier Castillo, Yasmien Kurdi, Biboy Ramirez, Jenine Desiderio, Marco Alcaraz	Cast: Ara Mina, Ogie Alcasid, Paul Salas, Wilma Doesnt, Reggie Curley	Cast: Mark Anthony Fernandez, Tanya Garcia, Elizabeth Oropesa, Ronnie Lazaro, Nonie Buencamino
VIII	2006	13th Floor	Yaya (lit. 'Nanny')	LRT
VIII	2006	Director: Rahyan Q. Carlos	Director: Topel Lee	Director: Michael Tuviera
VIII	2006	Writer: Fairlane Raymundo	Writer: Iris Saldavia-Aniban, Ben Cho, Edzon Mario Rapisora	Writer: Enzo Valdes
VIII	2006	Cast: Bearwin Meily, Janus del Prado, Keanna Reeves, Roxanne Guinoo, Joseph Bitangcol, Krystal Reyes, Isay Alvarez, Aaron Junatas, Robert Seña	Cast: Nash Aguas, Sheryl Cruz, Iza Calzado, Debraliz Valasote, TJ Trinidad, Nene Tamayo, Boom Antonio	Cast: Manilyn Reynes, Keempee de Leon, Quintin Alianza, Eugene Domingo, Cass Ponti, Empress Schuck, Ehra Madrigal, Mhyco Aquino, Charles Christianson, Sergio Garcia, Dino Imperial, IC Mendoza, Miko Palanca
IX	2007	Christmas Tree	Bangungot (lit. 'Nightmare')	Engkanto
IX	2007	Director: Paul Y. Daza	Director: Michael Tuviera	Director: Topel Lee
IX	2007	Writer: Fairlane Raymundo, Enzo Valdez	Writer: Venjie Pellena	Writer: Andrew Paredes
IX	2007	Cast: Nash Aguas, John Prats, Lovi Poe, Tonton Gutierrez, Gina Alajar, Boots Anson-Roa, Sophia Baars, John Lapus	Cast: Dennis Trillo, Pauleen Luna, Roxanne Guinoo, Jaymee Joaquin, Jason Gainza, Andrea Torres, Eugene Domingo	Cast: Katrina Halili, Matt Evans, Martin Escudero, Melissa Ricks, Felix Roco, Jewel Mische, Sam Concepcion, Nanding Josef, Jojo Alejar, Carmi Sanchez, Hector Macaso
X	2008	Emergency	Class Picture	Nieves the Engkanto Slayer
X	2008	Director: Michael Tuviera	Director: Topel Lee	Director: Michael Tuviera
X	2008	Writer: Ellen Estrada	Writer: Cheryl Ann Narvasa	Writer: Penny Tuviera, Alex Vicencio
X	2008	Cast: JC de Vera, Roxanne Guinoo, Mylene Dizon, Wendell Ramos, John Lapus, Janus del Prado, Denise Laurel	Cast: Kim Chiu, Gerald Anderson, Jean Garcia, Erich Gonzales, Charles Christianson, Niña Jose, Eda Nolan, Stef Prescott, Prince Stefan, IC Mendoza, Andrea Torres	Cast: Marian Rivera, Diana Zubiri, Buboy Villar, Jennica Garcia, Martin Escudero, Luis Alandy, Desiree del Valle, Marco Alcaraz, Iwa Moto, Pekto, Malou Crisologo
XI	2009	Diablo (lit. 'Devil')	Ukay-Ukay (lit. 'Thrift Shop')	Lamanglupa (lit. 'Goblin')
XI	2009	Director: Rico Gutierrez	Director: Don Michael Perez	Director: Jessel Monteverde
XI	2009	Writer: Elmer Gatchalian	Writer: Gina Marissa Tagasa	Writer: Renato Custodio
XI	2009	Cast: Maja Salvador, Mark Anthony Fernandez, Gina Alajar, Joem Bascon, Alex Castro, Irma Adlawan	Cast: Ruffa Gutierrez, Zoren Legaspi, Megan Young, John Lapus, Miguel Faustman, Carl Guevarra	Cast: Jennica Garcia, Rayver Cruz, Iya Villania, Martin Escudero, Dominic Roco, Felix Roco, Bangs Garcia, Julia Clarete
XII	2010	Mamanyiika (lit. 'Mama Doll')	Isla (lit. 'Island')	Punerarya (lit. 'Funeral Home')
XII	2010	Director: Zoren Legaspi	Director: Topel Lee	Director: Jerrold Tarog
XII	2010	Writer: Aloy Adlawan, Maribel Ilag	Writer: Jules Catanyag	Writer: Rona Lean Sales
XII	2010	Starring: Shaina Magdayao, Ricky Davao, Elijah Alejo	Starring: Andi Eigenmann, Rayver Cruz, John Lapus	Starring: Carla Abellana, Sid Lucero, Nash Aguas, Martin Escudero
XIII	2011	Tamawo	Parola (lit. 'Lighthouse')	Rain Rain Go Away
XIII	2011	Director: Richard V. Somes	Director: Jerrold Tarog	Director: Chris Martinez
XIII	2011	Writer: Aloy Adlawan, Jules Katanyag	Writer: Aloy Adlawan, Jerrold Tarog, Maribel Ilag, Roselle Y. Monteverde	Writer: Jerry Gracio
XIII	2011	Starring: Zanjoe Marudo, Maricar Reyes, Bugoy Cariño	Starring: Kathryn Bernardo, Sam Concepcion, Louise delos Reyes	Starring: Eugene Domingo, Edgar Allan Guzman, Boots Anson-Roa, Jay Manalo
XIV (The Invasion)	2012	Pamana (lit. 'Inheritance')	Lost Command	Unwanted
XIV (The Invasion)	2012	Director: Chito S. Roño		
XIV (The Invasion)	2012	Writer: Ricardo Lee	Writer: Rody Vera	Writer: Roy C. Iglesias
XIV (The Invasion)	2012	Starring: Janice de Belen, Herbert Bautista	Starring: Dennis Trillo, Paulo Avelino, Martin Escudero	Starring: Vhong Navarro, Lovi Poe
XV	2014	Ahas (lit. 'Snake')	Ulam (lit. 'Dish')	Flight 666
XV	2014	Director: Dondon Santos	Director: Jerrold Tarog	Director: Perci Intalan
XV	2014	Writer: Rody Vera	Writers: Zig Marasigan, Jerrold Tarog	Writers: Evie Macapugay, Renei Dimla, Perci Intalan
XV	2014	Starring: Erich Gonzales, JC de Vera	Starring: Dennis Trillo, Carla Abellana	Starring: Lovi Poe, Matteo Guidicelli
XVI (Extreme)	2023	Glitch	Mukbang	Rage
XVI (Extreme)	2023	Director: Richard V. Somes	Director: Jerrold Tarog	Director: Joey de Guzman
XVI (Extreme)	2023	Writers: Noreen B. Capili, Anton Santamaria	Writers: Onay Sales-Camero, Jerrold Tarog	Writer: Trisha Mae Delez
XVI (Extreme)	2023	Starring: Iza Calzado, Miggs Cuaderno, Donna Carriaga, Angel Guardian, Jewel Milag, Kim Atienza	Starring: Jane Oineza, RK Bagatsing, Paul Salas, AC Bonifacio, Ninong Ry, Elle Villanueva, Phi Palmos, Esnyr Ranollo, Jana Taladro, Francis Mata, Ian Gimena	Starring: Jane de Leon, Rob Gomez, Sarah Edwards, Paolo Gumabao, Bryce Eusebio, Dustin Yu, Mika Reins, Maita Ejercito, Jerico Estregan
XVII (Evil Origins)	2025	1775	2025	2050
XVII (Evil Origins)	2025	Director: Shugo Praico	Director: Joey de Guzman	Director: Ian Loreños
XVII (Evil Origins)	2025	Writer: Alex Castor, Noreen B. Capili	Writer: Onay Sales-Camero, John Paul E. Abellera	Writer: Gina Marissa Tagasa, Noreen B. Capili
XVII (Evil Origins)	2025	Starring: Carla Abellana, Janice de Belen, Loisa Andalio, Ysabel Ortega, Ashley Ortega, Elijah Alejo, Arlene Muhlach, Ara Mina, Monina Lawrence	Starring: Francine Diaz, Seth Fedelin, Fyang Smith, JM Ibarra, Althea Ablan, Karina Bautista, Sassa Gurl, Dylan Yturralde, Arkin Lagman, Alex Calleja, Kaila Estrada	Starring: Richard Gutierrez, Ivana Alawi, Manilyn Reynes, Dustin Yu, Matt Lozano, Celyn David, Sarah Edwards

== Television ==
Segments from the films aired on ABS-CBN every Saturday as part of the channel's Sabado Special programming block. The block was broadcast until at least 2018.

As of 2026, the first twelve films are available for streaming on Regal Entertainment's official YouTube channel. The thirteenth to seventeenth installments are available exclusively on Netflix.

== Spin-off ==
A feature-length adaptation of the "Pridyider" segment from the original film, titled Pridyider, was released on September 19, 2012. Directed by Rico Maria Ilarde, the film is a remake of the original segment and stars Andi Eigenmann.

== Reception ==
The Shake, Rattle & Roll series has become a regular attraction during the Christmas season in the Philippines, with most of its installments released as part of the Metro Manila Film Festival. It is regarded as one of the most successful franchises in Philippine cinema, with several of its monsters and stories becoming familiar to local audiences.

Several of its creatures and segments have become associated with the franchise's legacy. These include the killer refrigerator from "Pridyider" and the manananggal from "Manananggal" in the original film, the aswang from the second film, and the Undin from the third film. The Undin, in particular, has been recognised as an iconic creature in Philippine horror, while other memorable segments such as "Yaya" and "LRT" have also remained popular among audiences.

The franchise has also been described as a cultural touchstone in the Philippines, with its stories drawing from local mythology and reflecting aspects of Filipino society. In a 2022 interview, producer Mother Lily Monteverde discussed the series' longevity and its connection to the experiences of Filipino audiences.

== See also ==
- Regal Shocker, a similar series also produced by Regal Entertainment
