= Shake, Rattle & Roll II =

1990 film by Peque Gallaga and Lore Reyes

- Theatrical release poster
- Directed by: Peque Gallaga; Lore Reyes
- Screenplay by: Peque Gallaga; Don Escudero; Lore Reyes; Dwight Gaston
- Story by: Peque Gallaga; Don Escudero; Lore Reyes
- Based on: "Teniente Gimo" (segment "Aswang")
- Produced by: Jenny Luber
- Starring: Manilyn Reynes; Janice de Belen; Eric Quizon; Eddie Gutierrez; Isabel Granada; Caridad Sanchez; Joey Marquez; Carmina Villarroel; Daisy Romualdez; Sylvia Sanchez; Aljon Jimenez; Ana Roces; Anjo Yllana; Rez Cortez
- Cinematography: Eduardo Jacinto
- Edited by: Rene Tala
- Music by: Jose Gentica V
- Production company: Regal Films
- Distributed by: Regal Films
- Release date: December 25, 1990
- Running time: 120 minutes
- Country: Philippines
- Language: Filipino

Shake, Rattle & Roll II (titled onscreen as Shake Rattle & Roll 2) is a 1990 Filipino horror anthology film and the second installment of the Shake, Rattle & Roll film series, following the first film in 1984. The film was produced and distributed by Regal Films and is directed by Peque Gallaga and Lore Reyes. The film is an entry of the 1990 Metro Manila Film Festival. It is the first starring role of Manilyn Reynes before the following sequels. The third installment, Shake, Rattle & Roll III, was released in 1991.

The film consists of three stories: a newlywed husband is possessed by a malevolent doctor's spirit after putting on a cursed ring; a hospitalized man is targeted with black magic by his arrogant doctor; and a college student visiting her friend's province discovers that the local villagers are a clan of aswang planning to sacrifice her.

== Plot ==
=== "Multo" ===
Newlyweds Cathy and Mari spend their honeymoon at a rural vacation house in Baguio. They are less welcomed by the old caretaker who gives them a tour, including a locked room.

A malevolent presence disturbs the couple's time around the house. During their sleep, Cathy suffers a nightmare of a deranged doctor who tortures a young girl in his clinic. The next day while prepping breakfast, Cathy stumbles on the locked room which turns out to be the doctor's clinic from her dream.

The caretaker reveals the truth behind the house that was built before World War II: it was once owned by the obstetrician Dr. Corpus who murdered and tortured young ladies, including his niece Consuelo who was his last victim before the doctor committed suicide inside the clinic. His vengeful spirit remained trapped in the house's premises, including his clinic and personal belongings, to influence the victim and relive his sadistic felony. Meanwhile, Mari snuck into the clinic and wore Corpus' ring. The ghost prevents Mari from removing it to possess him.

During their dinner, Cathy notices Mari wearing the ring. An unpossessed Mari urges for his wife's help to remove it from his hand. Before Cathy could help him, Corpus' spirit repossesses Mari and attacks her as she locks herself into the clinic but the possessed Mari breaks through the door and intends to kill her. She manages to fight him off, releasing him from the ghost's influence. Mari urges Cathy to amputate his finger with the ring to prevent Corpus from coming back. After doing so, Cathy throws the ring into the fireplace as the couple are reunited after the ghost's haunting.

=== "Kulam" ===
Bogart, a handicapped and overmodest patient, has feelings for Dr. Kalbaryo, his arrogant but affectionate doctor, who does his check-up. After Kalbaryo finishes his check-up, Bogart's friend Tiffany, visits him in his room and starts to talk to him. As Tiffany leaves, Melanie, a troubled and flirtatious nurse, begins to have sex with Bogart. When Dr. Kalbaryo returns, she is enraged at seeing them in the act and fires Melanie. Kalbaryo berates Bogart for his love for her and reveals her family heritage. Kalbaryo later reveals herself to be a witch, starting from her great grandfather who is a witch doctor. When Bogart refuses to profess his love to Kalbaryo, she tortures him by performing sympathetic magic on him, by placing his hair on a doll. As Kalbaryo leaves the room, Tiffany, who had left her books in the hospital, returns and Bogart urges her to help him escape.

Kalbaryo, finds Bogart hiding in the nursery room with Tiffany and turns all the babies into tiyanaks. After escaping, Bogart and Tiffany hide in a laboratory where they find Melanie. They explain the situation to her who tells them that witches use body parts from their victims in their voodoo dolls to perform their spell. Tiffany realizes that she had Kalbaryo's hairbrush earlier after they bumped into each other. Melanie distracts Kalbaryo with the hospital's intercom system to allow Tiffany to enter the room and replace Bogart's hair with Kalbaryo's.

Melanie hides Bogart in a morgue for protection but Kalbaryo casts a spell to reanimate the dead bodies. After Kalbaryo leaves, Tiffany sneaks into the room and replaces the hair in the voodoo doll. Kalbaryo returns and catches Tiffany, taking the voodoo doll away from her. She forces Tiffany to watch as she turns her friend into a frog. Unaware that the doll has her hair, she turns herself into a frog. Tiffany manages to reverse the spell on the morgue, saving Bogart and Melanie from the undead.

As the trio begins celebrating, Melanie notices Kalbaryo, who is still a frog, follow them and scream for help. After being insulted by Kalbaryo, Melanie traps her in the zoology laboratory where she will be used for dissection.

=== "Aswang" ===
Portia is invited by her best friend, Monica to celebrate a fiesta in her village. After their arrival, she is welcomed by the villagers including Monica's mother and the village chief, but the tricycle driver who brought them to town urges Portia to leave the barrio and return to Manila.

While Portia is sleeping, Monica questions her mother about the chieftain's doubts on her about Portia in order to commence with the ceremony for the fiesta. The next day, Portia and Monica are greeted by their friends, Ricky and Milo, who are camping outside the barrio. They had followed Portia after she arrived at the village and are convinced about the rumors that the townsfolk are aswangs but she denies their claims.

Later, Portia becomes suspicious of the eccentric nature of the villagers after inspecting their appetite for eating raw meat during their daily meals. On the night of the fiesta, Portia finds the tricycle driver locked in a suspended hunting cage who convinces Portia to escape, warning her that the townspeople will eat him.

Back at the house, Monica confesses to Portia that the rumors behind the town are actually true and that the residents are a group of aswangs. She also reveals to her that she lures virgins into the barrio as a human sacrifice to commemorate their feast every year. As a result, their next victim is Portia as Monica attempts to sedate her with a drug-tainted tea to initiate the creatures' feast. Portia had already discovered her intention earlier and managed to switch their teas during their conversation. After Monica passes out from the drug, Portia conceals her on the bed with her blanket before the townspeople arrive as the chief unwittingly kills Monica and takes her body instead.

While she sneaks out of the barrio to escape, Portia witnesses the townspeople feasting on their victims, including the tricycle driver, during the ceremony before their transformation. The aswangs are infuriated by the death of Monica after realizing Portia's actions and begin to chase after her through the forest. They are unable to reach her after Portia finds a crucifix on the ground to protect herself as she manages to reach the boys' campsite.

The teens intend to escape using their van but are surrounded by the tribe after Portia drops the crucifix. As the creatures attack and kill Milo, trying to retrieve the crucifix; Portia and Ricky drive away. However, the chieftain chases after them and destroys the van to attack Portia but Ricky manages to defeat and kill him by shooting his cross trinket to his chest using a slingshot.

Eventually, the teens manage to escape from the barrio, after Portia suffers nightmares from the aswangs' attacks.

== Cast ==
=== Multo ===
- Janice de Belen as Cathy
- Eric Quizon as Mari
- Eddie Gutierrez as Dr. Corpus
- Caridad Sanchez as Manang
- Isabel Granada as Consuelo

=== Kulam ===
- Joey Marquez as Bogart
- Daisy Romualdez as Dra. Kalbaryo
- Carmina Villarroel as Tiffany
- Sylvia Sanchez as Melanie
- Joey Reyes as Morgue Attendant
- Jinky Laurel as Nurse
- Lotlot de Leon as Christie (Note: Character from Tiyanak (1988))
- Janice de Belen as Living Dead
- Dennis Padilla as Living Dead

=== Aswang ===
- Manilyn Reynes as Portia
- Ana Roces as Monica
- Vangie Labalan as Nanay
- Rez Cortez as Tanda
- Aljon Jimenez as Ricky
- Anjo Yllana as Milo
- Mae Anne Adonis as Aswang
- Malu de Guzman as Aswang
- Romy Romulo as Aswang
- Rey Solo as Aswang
- Sammy Brillantes as Aswang
- Lucy Quinto as Aswang
- Eva Ramos as Aswang
- Sieg Diaz as Aswang
- Lilia Cuntapay as Aswang
- Richard Gomez as Tricycle Driver
- The Barasoain Kalinangan Ensemble as Aswangs

== Accolades ==
Year	Award-Giving Body	Category	Recipient	Result
1990	Metro Manila Film Festival	Best Art Direction	Don Escudero	Won
1990	Metro Manila Film Festival	Best Visual Effects	Sammy Arranzamendez and Benny Batoccoy	Won
1990	Metro Manila Film Festival	Best Make-up	Denni Tan, Dominique Nazareth and Andrea Manahan	Won

== Adaptations ==
A graphic novel of the film, titled Shake, Rattle & Roll: Kahindik-hindik na Klasikong Katatakutan was published in 2016, and was created by authors Adam David, Carljoe Javier, Mervin Malonzo, and Noel Pascual. Their original titles were changed to: Pulot-Gata sa Bahay ni Dr. Corpus ("Multo"; lit. 'Honeymoon at the House of Dr. Corpus'), Code Alert sa Room 666 ("Kulam"; lit. 'Code Alert on Room 666'), and Pista sa Baryo Maliblib ("Aswang"; lit. 'Festival in a Remote Village').

== See also ==
- Shake, Rattle & Roll (film series)
- List of ghost films
