= Shake, Rattle & Roll III =

1991 film by Peque Gallaga and Lore Reyes

- Theatrical release poster
- Directed by: Peque Gallaga; Lore Reyes
- Screenplay by: Jerry Lopez Sineneng (segments "Yaya" and "Ate"); Dwight Gaston (segment "Nanay")
- Story by: Peque Gallaga; Lore Reyes; Don Escudero
- Produced by: Joey Gosiengfiao; Raul Laurente; Richard Goldwyn Monteverde; Ronald Stephen Monteverde
- Starring: Kris Aquino; Ogie Alcasid; Rosemarie Gil; Manilyn Reynes; Joey Marquez; Ai-Ai delas Alas; Janice de Belen; Gina Alajar; Joel Torre; Armida Siguion-Reyna; Subas Herrero; Inday Badiday
- Cinematography: Joe Tutanes
- Edited by: Danny Gloria
- Music by: Toto Gentica
- Production company: Good Harvest Unlimited Inc.
- Distributed by: Regal Films
- Release date: December 25, 1991
- Running time: 126 minutes
- Country: Philippines
- Language: Filipino

Shake, Rattle & Roll III is a 1991 Filipino horror anthology film and the third installment of the Shake, Rattle & Roll film series, following the second film in 1990. It was directed by Peque Gallaga and Lore Reyes. The film was an entry at the 1991 Metro Manila Film Festival. The film consists of three stories: a mother tries to save her baby from a malevolent spirit haunting their new house; a young woman discovers her deceased sister has been brought back to life by a cult; and a student inadvertently brings home a lake monster's egg from a beach trip.

The "Yaya" episode was reimagined in the eighth installment. Its Undin monster has become an enduring icon of Filipino pop culture, cementing its place as unforgettable creatures in Philippine cinema.

The fourth installment, Shake, Rattle & Roll IV, was released in 1992.

== Plot ==
=== "Yaya" ===
Tanya is a mother that has moved to a new house with her baby daughter, Jane. Everything is fine until a power outage occurs. Tanya, worried about Jane, decides to check on her daughter along with her mother, Lydia. She finds her housekeeper Virgie, who had been driven insane, hiding in a closet with Jane. Tanya grabs Jane but Virgie warns her that someone will take her baby.

After Tanya sends Virgie away, an old spirit who had passed in the house watches her. Tanya hires a new nanny, Aida. When a strong wind blows into the house, Aida asks Tanya to see Jane. When they do, Aida tells Tanya that she can sense that there is an evil spirit in their house and the land that the house was built on was used as a sacrificial ground. Aida decides to leave and asks Tanya to do the same. If she refused, she advises her to close all the doors and windows, never let the spirit enter, and never leave Jane alone.

That night, Tanya calls someone on the phone but the wind blows again. Tanya decides to open the door out of suspicion and is greeted by the spirit. As she tries to back up, the wind destroys the house's Christmas tree, explodes all the lights, and breaks everything. Suddenly, Tanya remembers Jane and runs to her room. As she tries to find portable light, the spirit appears in Jane's room, so Tanya decides to reason with her. When the spirit suddenly disappears, Tanya brings Jane with her to go back to Lydia's home.

After a few hours, Tanya tells Lydia what happened, but Lydia does not believe her. Lydia decides to instruct Chuck, Tanya's brother, to drive Tanya and Jane back home but Chuck refuses since it is nighttime and they leave in the morning. Later, Tanya dreams about the spirit and wakes up. She decides to sleep on the bed next to Jane.

The next morning, Tanya and Chuck arrive in Tanya's house. Tanya decides she will stay in the car since she is too scared to go inside, so she instructs Chuck to bring the essentials they need instead. While Chuck is inside, the wind blows again. Tanya, inside the car, decides to roll up the windows but is still attacked by the spirit trying to enter. Tanya, scared, decides to honk the car horn to call Chuck. Chuck goes to the car, but the spirit has already disappeared.

Chuck tells Tanya to give him the key to open the car's boot. After this, Tanya and Chuck go back to Lydia's home. As they get their stuff, the car door suddenly opens on its own. Tanya realizes that she did not close the car door after putting the stuff inside the boot, letting the spirit inside the car. Realizing her mistake, she rushes inside the house to save Jane. As she enters the room, the spirit appears, holding Jane in her hands. Tanya cries out her name, leaving her fate unknown.

=== "Ate" ===
Rosalyn, a teacher, and her colleagues are watching a TV show at a school cafeteria talking about a person being able to revive the dead. The reporter ends the interview even before getting to the actual root of the story. During this, Rosalyn is called by the principal and is told that her older sister Rowena, has died and left a suicide note, given to Fr. Salazar, who gave Rowena her last communion.

The next day, Rosalyn arrives in a remote part of her province and arrives to where Rowena is staying. She also meets a boy, saying that her sister is already dead. Inside the house, she finds a coffin at the main hallway with no one inside. She also finds Rowena walking outside in a white dress. When Rosalyn rejoices and hugs Rowena though, Rowena does not show her emotions and digs the ground, putting it on her body.

Suddenly, Mrs. Redoblado, the wife of Rowena's doctor, arrives and catches Rosalyn and Rowena on the ground. Mrs. Redoblado tells Rosalyn that Rowena is sick and that the coffin inside the house was for Rowena, since they thought she would not survive her sickness. She also asks where Milton, Rowena's husband and the doctor's son, is, but Mrs. Redoblado tells her that he already left.

During dinner, Rosalyn tries to feed Rowena food other than soup but is stopped by the doctor's servant, Kardo. The doctor tells her that it is fine, but Rowena suddenly begins to move differently, so the doctor and his servant try to cure her. Rosalyn wants to check what is happening but is stopped by the doctor's wife.

At nighttime, she decides to check up on Rowena and asks her what's going on. Rowena does not talk but looks at the plant in her room instead. She suddenly puts the plant's roots on her face and tries to eat the soil. Rosalyn tries to stop her, but she realizes Rowena is chained to her bed. Mrs. Redoblado appears and tells Rosalyn that Rowena is still not feeling well, and she might hurt herself at night when she walks around the house, so she has been chained up. Rosalyn tries to ask more questions about Rowena about Mrs. Redoblado tells her that she might be too worried for her sister and that she should take a break around town, then she locks Rowena's room, much to Rosalyn's shock.

The next day, she talks to the boy, named Tano, told her that Rowena is dead. He also tells her that dead people should be buried on the ground. Rosalyn and Tano roam around the town's cemetery. They came across Rowena's supposed-to-be burial ground with someone digging a hole.

At the town's church, Rosalyn talks to Fr. Salazar about Rowena's case. Fr. Salazar tells her that Rowena is truly dead. He talks about things that cannot be explained, like miracles, which are perfect miracles because God made it happen. On Rowena's case, her miracle is not perfect, since she cannot talk or move completely fine, which is a case of a miracle made by a bad spirit. Fr. Salazar also explains that Rowena is putting dirt on her body because she is supposed to be buried in the ground.

In a room inside the doctor's mansion, she finds a chapel, led by Dr. Redoblado. On the upper part of the mansion, she finally finds Milton, who tells her that Dr. Redoblado is only resurrecting her from the dead using the Devil's power and Rowena can only be at peace when the doctor and his wife are dead. He cannot do it himself because he does not have the strength to kill his own parents. He tells Rosalyn to kill them by poisoning their food.

That night, while no one is looking, Rosalyn successfully puts the poison inside with Milton's help. However, during dinner, Dr. Redoblado and his wife did not drank the soup and forces Rosalyn to do it instead. It is revealed that he and his wife knew about her plan the entire time and that the soup they were eating is not poisoned at all, since Kardo already threw the poisoned soup away. The doctor orders Kardo to kill her since she knows their secret. Rosalyn escapes and goes to her sister's room.

Inside Rowena's room, Rosalyn tries to remove Rowena's chains, but is attacked by Rowena, thinking she is the doctor and his wife. Rosalyn talks to her sister to meet at the cemetery to bury her. Tano reunites with Rosalyn inside the mansion and helps Rowena. Outside the mansion, Dr. Redoblado and his wife order the servants to look for them inside. However, they let Rosalyn, Rowena and Tano escape.

At the cemetery, Rowena goes inside the hole dug by the man earlier. Suddenly, Dr. Redoblado and his servants surround the three of them, with his wife capturing Rosalyn. Tano successfully throws wood at Mrs. Redoblado's face and dies. Dr. Redoblado tries to kill Rosalyn, but he is dragged down by Rowena and choked to death. Rowena finally dies peacefully, and Rosalyn tries to cover the hole. Milton, who escaped the mansion, decides to bury Dr. Redoblado and Rowena himself, happy that his wife is finally at peace.

=== "Nanay" ===
Maloy, a nature-loving but troubled and dolt science girl who is constantly harassed by her dormmates, led by Dezzi Rae, is having a field trip with her classmates and teachers in a lake for their science project. Maloy's best friend Sally finds strange eggs in the lake. After Sally gives the eggs to Maloy, they hear a disturbing voice from the lake. As Sally goes for a swim, an unknown creature drowns her. The teachers and students find her body covered in moss and gunk. Before they leave, the creature resurfaces and enters one of Maloy's coolers.

After Maloy returns to the dormitory, the strict dormitory owner Eba warns her about going to the lake. Eba explains to her about a mysterious creature living in the lake; the Undin, a water-nymph creature. Whenever someone disturbs them, especially their belongings and eggs, they kill them. Maloy realizes that Sally had stolen the eggs she found from the Undin before her death, but Eba assures that her story was told by her grandmother. As Eba leaves, the Undin jumps out of the cooler. Maloy grabs the eggs and tries to call the Undin to return the eggs to her, but the Undin hides from her. Eba and the dorm mates appear at the kitchen and Maloy tries to convince them that the Undin was real, but they do not believe her.

As Dezzi Rae have a party with her dorm mates and friends at the dormitory, Maloy goes to the bathroom to take a shower. The Undin, is also in the bathroom, kills Eba and one of the partygoers, Ojay, by spitting them with her acidic saliva after Maloy witnessed Ojay's body melting. She notices the Undin and takes the eggs to call the creature, but Dezzi Rae and her friends appear. Maloy tries to convince them that the Undin was here and explains Ojay's death. She shows them the eggs, but Dezzi Rae grabs them from her, and she and her friends play with them. Dezzi Rae forces Maloy to watch as she destroys the eggs. Maloy manages to break free from the group and overpowers Dezzi Rae. As she and her friends leave the bathroom, Maloy finds one of the Undin's eggs intact. The Undin, enraged by the death of her children, kills Dezzi Rae and her friends. Maloy overhears the group's screams, enters the dormitory and watches the Undin kill Dezzi Rae's friends. Maloy calls the Undin and knows that she was a mother. Maloy confesses to the Undin that she & Sally never meant harm to steal her eggs and knows about a mother's life. Maloy began to give the egg back to the Undin and puts her back to the cooler, where Maloy encountered the creature earlier, to bring her back to the lake.

Maloy returns to the lake to bring the Undin back home. After bidding farewell to Maloy, the Undin reunites with her mate as they swim back to their home.

== Cast ==
=== Yaya ===
- Kris Aquino as Tanya
- Lilia Cuntapay† as the Spirit
- Rosemarie Gil as Lydia
- Ogie Alcasid as Chuck
- Mae-Ann Adonis as Virgie
- Eva Ramos as Aida

=== Ate ===
- Janice de Belen as Rosalyn
- Gina Alajar as Rowena
- Joel Torre as Milton Redoblado
- Armida Siguion-Reyna as Mrs. Redoblado
- Subas Herrero as Dr. Redoblado
- Inday Badiday as herself
- Pen Medina as Fr. Salazar
- Lucy Quinto as Madame Sabrina
- Cris Daluz† as Kardo
- Joey Reyes as Principal
- Cris Balase as Tano
- Jomari Yllana as Student

=== Nanay ===
- Manilyn Reynes as Maloy
- Joey Marquez as Ojay
- Ai-Ai delas Alas as Dezzi Rae
- Vangie Labalan as Mama Eba/Mommy Ems
- Richard Cepeda as Borg
- Manny Castañeda as Terry
- Candy Pangilinan as Sally
- Dolly de Leon
- Giselle Sanchez
- Agnes Ventura as Lalaine
- Roxanne Silverio as Tweetie
- Marlene Aguilar as Shasha
- Mart Kenneth Rebamonte as Mang Kanor

== Reception ==
Jelou Galang deemed the nymph-like creature Undin, in Nanay, memorable and wrote: "After 30 years, Undin remains iconic and horrific even just within the four corners of our bathroom.", while Jules Guiang wrote: ""Nanay" shifts from coming-of-age tale to horror to comedy almost within the same scene, and these jarring tonal changes make the horror more pronounced and unexpected."

== See also ==
- Shake, Rattle & Roll (film series)
- List of ghost films
