= Shake, Rattle & Roll VI =

1997 Filipino film

- Theatrical release poster
- Directed by: Maurice Carvajal ("Ang Telebisyon" segment); Frank G. Rivera ("Ang Tulay" segment); Anton Juan ("Ang Buwan" segment)
- Screenplay by: Luna Lopez ("Ang Telebisyon" segment); Tony Perez ("Ang Buwan" and "Ang Tulay" segments)
- Produced by: Joey Gosiengfiao
- Starring: Tonton Gutierrez; John Apacible; Raymond Keannu; Daniel Pacia; Joanne Quintas; Georgia Ortega; Ara Mina; Aiza Seguerra; Matet de Leon; Tom Taus, Jr.; Camille Prats
- Cinematography: Romulo Araojo; Eduardo Cabrales
- Edited by: Edmond "Bot" Jarlego
- Music by: Jesse Lasaten
- Production company: MAQ Productions Inc.
- Distributed by: Regal Films
- Release date: January 22, 1997
- Running time: 101 minutes
- Country: Philippines
- Language: Filipino

Shake, Rattle & Roll VI (titled onscreen as Shake Rattle and Roll 6) is a 1997 Filipino horror anthology film and the sixth installment of the Shake, Rattle & Roll film series, following the fifth film in 1994. It was produced by MAQ Productions Inc., and was distributed by Regal Films. It is directed by Maurice Carvajal, Anton Juan, and Frank Rivera. The film is not an entry to the Metro Manila Film Festival unlike other installments, but it was meant to be an entry in the 1996 Metro Manila Film Festival.

The film consists of three stories: a neglected girl is kidnapped by an evil clown that emerges from her television; three teenage girls try to pacify the vengeful ghost of a boy haunting a bridge; and a college student investigates a series of campus murders linked to a woman who transforms during a full moon.

The seventh installment, Shake, Rattle & Roll 2k5, was released in 2005 after an 8-year hiatus.

== Plot ==
=== "Ang Telebisyon" ===
Jennifer and her family live in a neighborhood full of cases with missing children. Her parents, Emil and Madel, are way too busy at work to notice Jennifer at home, so she feels neglected. On a Friday, Jennifer and her nanny Lucy, are all alone at home while Jennifer's parents are away. That day, a man who works for a company named Boo Enterprises shows up outside their home. He offers her a television after Jennifer's father gets chosen by a computer name generator. The man tells her that he will come back on Monday if Jennifer's parents do not like the TV. The man also gives Jennifer a toy resembling a clown, only exclusive to the TV.

Lucy is then scolded by Emil and Madel since she let the man inside their home and even let him drop the TV as well. That night, Emil and Madel leave the house to go to an award show where Emil has to accept one. Alone at the house with Jennifer, Lucy lets her boyfriend, Sammy, inside the house. They intend to steal things from the house. Alone in the living room, Jennifer wakes up to the voice of Mr. Boo the clown from the TV. Mr. Boo lures her to the TV and tries to make her go near the TV. When Jennifer runs to hide, the toy she was given gets covered in worms.

Suddenly, Mr. Boo exits the television into Jennifer's house. While this is happening, Lucy and Sammy steal Madel's jewelry. Sammy tells Lucy that he actually betrayed her and plans to leave her by herself. When Lucy tries to attack him, Sammy knocks her unconscious and goes outside. When he tries to leave the house, he encounters Mr. Boo. Mr. Boo steals Madel's jewelry box and kills Sammy when he tries to fight him. On the road, Emil and Madel are stranded after a wheel of their car breaks. Madel decides to go back home without Emil after arguing with him. Emil decides to go back with Madel and talk about their problems instead of going to the award show.

In the bathroom, Jennifer is hiding and tries to go outside, only for Mr. Boo to break the door and try to catch her. When Jennifer is attacked, she finds the acetone Lucy used to clean the toilet. She opens it and sprays it on Mr. Boo, burning his face. Hiding outside, Jennifer tries to leave but is knocked out by Mr. Boo. When Emil and Madel arrive back home, they find the unconscious Jennifer in Mr. Boo's arms and they enter the TV. While Jennifer cries for their help, Emil and Madel talk about their mistakes and reconcile. During this, Jennifer manages to stick her hand out of the TV for her parents to help her escape. When Jennifer escapes, the television vanishes into thin air and her parents apologize.

The next day, the family is packing for their road trip to the beach. While Emil closes the gate of their house, Jennifer notices the Boo Enterprises truck and the man outside, only to see another kid falling for their trap.

=== "Ang Tulay" ===
While feeding her tortoise, Lilian meets a boy at a bridge. He tells her that he wants to play angels with her. He also tells her to jump off the bridge if she wants to be an angel but Lilian decides to leave and go home.

Sunny, Lilian's friend, passes the bridge that same night driving her car and meets a boy holding a ball. When she leaves, the boy suddenly disappears. Marice, another friend of Lilian's, calms her mother using a lullaby after her mother dreams about her dead son, Jun Jun. When Marice sings the lullaby, Jun Jun appears outside the house and leads Marice to the bridge. Then, while Marice watches, Jun Jun jumps off the bridge.

The next morning, a funeral is held for Nonoy, Lilian's brother. It turns out that Nonoy was the child Sunny saw that night. Afterwards Lilian tells Sunny about what happened to her that night and how she was supposed to be the one who died and not Nonoy. Then, Sunny goes to Marice's house, with Marice telling her that processions are held at the bridge when a kid dies, which started because of Jun Jun's death.

During Nonoy's procession, he appears and wears the same clothes that were worn by the kid Lilian saw at the bridge. After the mass, Lilian dreams about the mysterious man and the child melting his face while the bridge is burning. The next day, Sunny, Lilian, and Marice go to the waterfalls near the barrio with Sunny's mother. Sunny gives them a pendant of Saint Christopher each and talks about his story. When they swim at the falls, they get a vision of the bridge and scream for help, with Sunny's mother helping them.

At the church, Sunny's mother tells the kids to go to Mang Cris, an espiritista, to learn more about the bridge. Mang Cris, in his house at night, tells the kids that spirits stay in the living world because they either still need to accomplish something or they miss their family. Because of this, Mang Cris decides to help the kids connect with the dead children. When they succeed on communicating with Nonoy, they decide to do it at the riverbank instead.

At the riverbank, they are told by the children that someone named Uro wants himself to not be lonely at the bridge and that he lives down beneath the river's surface, unlike the children's spirits. The next day, Aling Bining, who sells clothes to Sunny's mother, talks about the dead children and the bridge. Overhearing this, Sunny talks to the parents of the dead children and goes to tell Marice her findings at the church.

Sunny tells Marice that, since 1985, 10 children have died but none of them are named Uro. She also tells Marice that Aling Bining told her about the workers of the bridge and that they would kill children and pour their blood for the bridge. She also told her that the bridge might have been built since 1921 but was demolished and rebuilt after the Second World War. That night, the friends go to the cemetery to look for Uro's grave. When they do, Uro's spirit appears behind them and they leave.

They arrive at Mang Cris' and try to communicate with Uro. They are suddenly transported to years before the bridge was built and Jun Jun, Nonoy and the dead children appear. They arrive to the time Uro was kidnapped. The dead spirits tell them that Uro was tricked by the workers of the bridge that he would go to Boston as a traveler but that it turned out he was going to work as a slave instead.

Mang Cris realizes that Uro saw that his blood was going to be mixed with the cement and that his body will be drowned in the river inside a sack. He stays there to this day to lure children and play with them. They all realize that the children can't leave. Mang Cris asks them how to but they are transported to the surface of the river.

Knowing what to do, Mang Cris calms the friends down and finds Uro's body, letting him and the children escape to the afterlife. After this, a procession is made and they all celebrate.

=== "Ang Buwan" ===
At a college, a student is mysteriously killed by a monster in the gymnasium's showers.

Professor Ricardo teaches his class about femininity. Two of his students are Robert, who is late for his class and Manray, Robert's friend who just broke up with a girl after he stood her up. The next day, Manray meets Luna while studying. She tells him that he should watch her in theatre rehearsals, in which he agrees.

During theatre rehearsals, Ricardo enters and finds Luna, only to be suspicious of her. That night, Manray decides to follow Luna to her house. He, then, invites Robert to help him give flowers to Luna but they meet her mother instead of her. When they leave, Manray realizes his flowers have suddenly wilted. The next night, Manray tries to meet Luna again but sees her little sister instead. That same night, Robert is at school trying to molest the school's nurse. When the nurse hides from him, he tries to find her, only to meet and get killed by the monster instead.

The next day, Ricardo confidentially tells Manray that what happened to Robert has happened 5 years ago, with the killings only happening in a full moon and the victims only being male. After a few days, Manray and Luna are officially dating and Luna has invited Manray into her house. Before doing anything more, the things inside the house starts to move on its own, so Luna tells Manray to meet her at the theatre tomorrow evening.

That evening on a full moon at the theatre, Manray is called by his doctor when Luna suddenly disappears and her sister is at her place. Manray tries to catch up but is met with a dove and Luna's mother instead. Luna suddenly appears again and they go inside the building. Luna, after performing, goes backstage and disappears from Manray. Inside the building, Ricardo is there as well and tries to save Manray by performing a ritual.

Inside a room, Luna finally appears herself to Manray, but she appears to him in her true form as a ghoul and Manray tries to reason with her. He tells her that he has been in love with her from the day they met and Luna realizes that he has changed in his view of love and decides to spare him. In the morning, they meet again at the tree they first met with Ricardo. Luna reveals that he lures men to teach them a lesson in respecting women and Manray passed the test and is given a second chance. Luna finally leaves and disappears into the afterlife as doves fly around the area.

== Cast ==
=== Ang Telebisyon ===
- Camille Prats as Jennifer Larroza
- Daniel Pasia as Mr. Boo
- Joanne Quintas as Madel Larroza
- John Apacible† as Emil Larroza
- Theresa Jamias as Lucy
- Bobby Benitez as Sammy

=== Ang Tulay ===
- Aiza Seguerra as Lilian
- Matet de Leon as Marice
- Ara Mina as Sunny
- Tom Taus, Jr. as Mauro "Uro" Flores
- Melissa Mendez as Marice's mother
- Kiko Villamayor as Jun Jun

=== Ang Buwan ===
- Tonton Gutierrez as Manray
- Giorgia Ortega as Luna Rivas
- Raymond Keannu as Robert
- Roy Alvarez† as Prof. Ricardo G. Abad
- Toffee Calma

== Reception ==
The segment "Tulay", "referencing legends surrounding the construction of the San Juanico Bridge during the Marcos era" has been described as follows by Jules Guiang as follows: "Shedding its elements of horror and malice, “Tulay” anchors itself in childhood loneliness and the burden placed on the youth in strengthening society. In the process of putting the boy’s soul to rest, the trio turn to religion to offer some form of comfort and companionship – the promise of a forgiving God causing everything to resurface, bones and all."

== See also ==
- Shake, Rattle & Roll (film series)
- List of ghost films
