= Tiyanak =

Philippine mythical creature

Creature information
- Grouping: Demon child/Changeling

Origin
- Region: Philippines

The tiyanak (also tianak or tianac Tagalog: [ˈtjanak]) is a vampiric creature in Philippine mythology that takes on the form of a toddler or baby. Although there are various types, it typically takes the form of a newborn baby and cries in the jungle to attract unwary travelers. Once it is picked up by an unfortunate passerby, it reverts to its true form and attacks the victim. The tiyanak is also depicted to take malevolent delight in leading travelers astray, or in abducting children.

== Historical accounts ==
"They had another deception—namely, that if any woman died in childbirth, she and the child suffered punishment; and that, at night, she could be heard lamenting. This was called patianac."

Fr. Juan de Plasencia of the Tagalogs (1589)

"449. Pregnant women could not cut their hair, for they said that the children that they would bear would have no hair. When a woman is about to give birth, some men undress until they are stark naked. Then taking shields and catans, one takes his stand in the silong, and another on the ridge of the house, and they continually fence with the wind with their catans as long as the parturition lasts. I have removed some from this performance by force of punishment. They say that it is to keep the patiànac and the osuàng away from the woman. These are witches among them who come to obstruct the success of the childbirth, and to suck out the souls of children; and the people act thus in order to prevent them. He who does not wish to have this observed in public, through fear of punishment, removes his wife to another house for the parturition, if he thinks that the witch is in his."

Fr. Francisco de San Antonio, Cronicas (1738–44)

"They have many other superstitions, as that of the patianac, a spirit or ideal being, whose employment or amusement consists in preventing, [41]by certain means peculiar to itself, the delivery of a woman in labour. To counteract the malignity of this spirit, the husband, fastening the door, reduces himself to a state of complete nudity, lights a fire, and arming himself with his sword, continues to flourish it furiously, until the woman is delivered."

Fr. Martinez de Zuniga, Estadismo (1803)

== Appearance and characteristics ==
While various legends have slightly different versions of the tiyanak folklore, the stories all agree on its ability to mimic an infant, able to imitate an infant's cries for luring victims. In some legends, the Tiyanak may take the form of a specific child.

- In one version, it retains the general shape of a baby but then forms sharp claws and fangs to attack its victim.
- In another, it shares certain similarities with dwarfs and is similarly associated with the earth. In this version, the "true" form of the tiyanak is that of a little old man with wrinkled skin, a long beard and mustache, a flat nose and eyes the size of peseta coins. The same story says that a tiyanak is relatively immobile because one leg is shorter than the other. This deformity forces it to move by leaping and/or crawling rather than walking, making it difficult to hunt or stalk victims, but its ability to mimic an infant's cry compensates for this disadvantage.
- In yet another story it is seen supernaturally flying through the forest (still in the form of a baby) and in a legend from the island of Mindoro it transforms into a black bird before flying away
- In another version from Central Luzon, especially in Pampanga, the tiyanak are described as small, nut-brown people who don't walk on the ground but rather float on air. They have large noses, wide mouths, large fierce eyes and sharp voices.
- In the Batangas version, the tiyanak are described as regular babies who were lost in the wild. They are believed to be babies who died without a name, aborted or otherwise. It also is said that when the cry of a tiyanak sounds soft, one is actually nearby, and conversely if the cry sounds loud, it is actually distant.

== Origins ==
There are various stories on how tiyanaks came to be. The Mandaya people of Mindanao claim that the tiyanak is the spirit of a child whose mother died before giving birth. This caused it to be "born in the ground", thus gaining its current state. A similar supernatural creature in Malay folklore is the Pontianak, which was a woman who died before giving birth.

With the Spanish colonization of the Philippines in the 16th century, the tiyanak myth was integrated into Catholicism. The tiyanak in the Catholic version were supposedly the souls of infants that died before being baptized. In modern-day Philippines, this definition has extended to that of aborted fetuses that returned from death to seek revenge on those who deprived them of life. It is also said that Tiyanak cannot go to the afterlife because of not having a name. This causes them to be Earth-bound creatures which wander around searching for someone to give them names.

== Protection ==
In local belief, various countermeasures are supposedly effective against the tiyanak. Those that were led astray by the creature's cries are believed to be able to break the enchantment by turning their clothes inside out. The tiyanak finds the method humorous enough to let go of the traveler and go back to the jungles.

Loud noises such as a New Year's celebration are also thought to be enough to drive the tiyanak away from the vicinity. Objects believed to repel aswang (vampiric shape-shifters), like garlic and the rosary are also commonly believed to be effective against the tiyanak. It is also believed that giving a name to these lost souls will bring them peace, and offering a white candle will help guide its spirit to afterlife. In Batangas, it is believed that the sound of clinking coins will drive the tiyanak away.

According to Jose A. Samson, a common belief among albularyos in rural Luzon in how to ward off the tiyanak is to play the guitar: "For some unexplained reason, so they claim, the Tianak [sic] has a special allergy for the tones produced by stringed instruments. Upon hearing one, the monster would supposedly roll away and disappear."

== In popular culture ==
The tiyanak is the subject of many Philippine films:

- Tianak (1953)
- Tiyanak (1988)
- Juan Tanga, Super Naman, at ang Kambal Na Tiyanak (1990)
- Shake, Rattle & Roll film series: II (1990), X (2008), Fourteen: The Invasion (2012), and XV (2014)
- Impakto (1996)
- Tiyanaks (2007)
- T'yanak (2014)

Tiyanaks appeared in the 2006 TV series Super Inggo, dubbed as the "junanaks" by Budong and Pareng Jomar. They also appeared in week-32 2013 episodes of Juan dela Cruz.

The Tiyanak is also featured as a monster, along with other Philippine folklore-inspired beings, in the Port Malaya patch of Ragnarok Online.

The Tiyanak also appears as a featured monster in an episode of the Netflix anime series Trese.

The 2026 film Forgotten Island features a tiyanak named Bungi, voiced by Manny Jacinto.

== See also ==
- Pontianak
- Toyol
- Kuntilanak
