= Lollie Mara =

Filipino actress (1939–2025)

- Born: Gloria Pichel Mara; June 26, 1939
- Died: October 17, 2025 (aged 86)
- Occupation: Actress

Gloria "Lollie" Pichel Mara (June 26, 1939 – October 17, 2025), was a Filipino actress.

== Early life ==
Gloria Pichel Mara was born on June 26, 1939.

== Career ==
Lollie Mara's acting career began in the 1980s. Due to her mestiza features, Mara was typically cast as a wealthy character in film, television, and theater.

Among her feature film credits are Iiwan Mo (1993), Forevermore (2002), Milan (2004), Shake, Rattle & Roll X (2008), The Unkabogable Praybeyt Benjamin (2011), Shake, Rattle and Roll Fourteen: The Invasion (2012), and Ang Bagong Pamilya Ni Ponching (2016). She is a co-winner of the best supporting actress at the Cinemalaya for her role in Bagong Pamilya.

She also appeared in television series such as Akin Pa Rin ang Bukas (2013), Maria Mercedes (2013–2014), Be Careful with My Heart (2013), Rhodora X (2014), Princess in the Palace (2016), and Kambal Karibal (2018).

== Government involvement ==
When director-producer Maria Montelibano was made the head of state-owned Radio Television Malacañang (RTVM) by President Corazon Aquino, Montelibano included Mara as part of her staff.

Mara was promoted as head of the Radio Television Malacañang (RTVM) during the administration of President Fidel V. Ramos, but she had to put her acting career on hold. He role continued during the presidency of Joseph Estrada before retiring from government work and returning to acting.

== Death ==
Mara died on October 17, 2025, with her surviving relatives confirming her death the following day.

== Awards and nominations ==
Year	Work	Organisation	Category	Result	Source
2016	Ang Bagong Pamilya ni Poching	Cinemalaya	Best Supporting Actress	Won	
