= Lilia Cuntapay =

Filipina actress (1935-2016)

- Cuntapay in 2008
- Born: Lilia B. Cuntapay; September 16, 1935; Gonzaga, Cagayan, Philippine Islands
- Died: August 20, 2016 (aged 80); Pinili, Ilocos Norte, Philippines
- Occupations: Actress, teacher
- Years active: 1986–2016
- Notable work: Shake Rattle & Roll; Six Degrees of Separation from Lilia Cuntapay
- Children: 3

Lilia B. Cuntapay (Tagalog: [ˈliljɐ kunˈtapaɪ]; September 16, 1935 – August 20, 2016) was a Filipina actress and former teacher. She is popularly recognized as the "Queen of Philippine Horror Movies" for her appearances in horror movies and subsequent contributions to the Philippine film industry.

Cuntapay's debut role was in the Filipino horror film series Shake Rattle & Roll in 1991. She found acclaim for her first leading role, in the film Six Degrees of Separation from Lilia Cuntapay, which won her the Best Actress award at the 2011 Cinema One Originals Digital Film Festival. One of Cuntapay's final television appearances was in the teleserye FPJ's Ang Probinsyano.

== Early life ==
Cuntapay was born in the Cabiraoan village of Gonzaga, Cagayan, on September 16, 1935. After she earned her BS degree in Education, she taught in the primary school levels in Tuguegarao. After Cuntapay stopped teaching, she ventured into the buy-and-sell trade. She also worked in various office staff-level positions in the National Police Commission (NAPOLCOM).

== Career ==
=== Horror movie extra ===
Cuntapay was among the 40 actors trained in the first batch of acting workshops conducted by Lori Reyes and Peque Gallaga for LVN Pictures.

In 1991, Cuntapay played the spooky nanny of Kris Aquino's character in Shake, Rattle & Roll III, and in the following year she was cast to play a character identified as an "aswang" —a role for which she would later be typecast in many subsequent movie appearances, and these earned her the title "Queen of Philippine Horror Movies." After her death a film critic, who assessed the top five performances of Cuntapay's career, said that in her role for the 1992 film Aswang :

Cuntapay was casted as the neighbor thought to be the aswang terrorizing the barrio. This is the start of the flood of horror movie offers.

=== Television appearances ===
In 2009, Cuntapay appeared as an albularyo in the ABS-CBN afternoon TV series Precious Hearts Romances Presents: Bud Brothers. She was featured in the Kapuso Mo, Jessica Soho 2009 Halloween Special. She appeared as Rosanna, a role which she shared with Maricar Reyes, in the Midnight DJ episode named "Kwentas ng Mangkukulam". Cuntapay was also cast as Miley Cyrus in Lokomoko High's spoof of the Party in the USA music video. At the end of the year, she had a minor role in the film Nobody, Nobody But... Juan — an entry to the 2009 Metro Manila Film Festival.

In 2010, Cuntapay played an old lady in The Last Prince and a fairy disguised as an old lady in the "Inday Bote" episode of Wansapanataym. The following year, she played Upeng in the mini-series Sa Ngalan ng Ina, the first offering of TV5's TV5 Miniserye series in the latter part of 2011.

=== Six Degrees of Separation from Lilia Cuntapay and onwards ===
Cuntapay played a fictionalized version of herself in the independent mockumentary Six Degrees of Separation from Lilia Cuntapay—described as a bittersweet fictional account on Cuntapay's life as a Philippine showbiz extra, an entry to the 2011 Cinema One Originals and directed by Antoinette H. Jadaone. The film won six awards in the 2011 Cinema One Originals Digital Film Festival, including a Best Actress award for Cuntapay.

Cuntapay's last film appearance was My Bebe Love in 2015, which was an entry in the 2015 Metro Manila Film Festival. Cuntapay's final TV show appearance was in the action series FPJ's Ang Probinsyano.

== Personal life ==
Cuntapay never remarried but adopted three children: Gilmore, Magdalena and Elma.

== Death ==
On August 5, 2016, it was confirmed that Cuntapay suffered from a spinal cord illness and that she was unable to walk. She sought help from her friends and colleagues in the film industry to be able to raise money for her treatment. On August 20, Cuntapay died in her son's home at Barangay Tartarabang in Pinili, Ilocos Norte; she was 80. Her grave was initially unkempt and marked only by a dilapidated tarpaulin due to her family's lack of funds to maintain it. In October 2019, it was subsequently reported that her grave had been properly marked and its surroundings cleaned after help from the provincial and local governments.

== Filmography ==
=== Television ===
Year	Title	Role	Notes	Source
1995	Maalaala Mo Kaya		Episode: "Balon"	
1997	Magandang Gabi, Bayan	White Lady	Episode: "Kababalaghan sa Amlan"	
2009	Precious Hearts Romances Presents: Bud Brothers	Tandang Casimsiman Tioleko	Uncredited	
2009	Kapuso Mo, Jessica Soho	Herself	Episode: "Halloween Stars, Late Celebrities, and Death and Tradition"	
2009	Midnight DJ	Rosanna	Guest, Episode: "Kwentas ng Mangkukulam"	
2009	Lokomoko High	Miley Cyrus	Guest, "LBM" segment, "Party in the USA" spoof	
2010	The Last Prince	Old lady	Guest, 1 episode. Role is patterned after the old hag in Snow White.	
2010	Wansapanataym	Old lady/Fairy	Episode: "Inday Bote" (Parts 1 & 2)	
2011	Spooky Nights	Old lady	Guest, Episode: "Snow White Lady and the Seven Ghost"	
2011	Maalaala Mo Kaya	Albularyo	Episode: Wig	
2011	Captain Barbell: Ang Pagbabalik	Faustina	Guest, 2 episodes	
2011	TV5 Miniserye: Sa Ngalan ng Ina	Yaya Upeng		
2011	Tunay na Buhay	Herself		
2011	Spooky Nights	Maria	Episode: "Panata"	
2012	Wansapanataym	Old Lady	Episode: "Water Willy"	
2012	Felina: Prinsesa ng mga Pusa	Madam Lucilla		
2012	It's Showtime	Herself	Guest, 1 episode	
2012	Luv U	Old Ms Casimsiman	Guest, 1 episode	
2012	Third Eye	Ursula	Episode: "Sirena sa Breakwater"	
2012	Artista Academy	Herself – Challenger		
2012	TodaMax	White Lady		
2012	Enchanted Garden	Oracula		
2013	Juan dela Cruz	Babaylan		
2013	Cassandra: Warrior Angel	Aling Ursula		
2013	Maynila	Lola Chedeng	Episode: "Haunted House for Love"	
2013	Got to Believe	Yaya Yiling		
2014	Forevermore	Aunor		
2016	Juan Tamad	Caretaker		
2016	Sāq Al-bāmbū			
2016	FPJ's Ang Probinsyano	Aling Loring Layug	Last television appearance	

=== Films ===
Year	Title	Role	Notes	Source
1986	...Sabik Kasalanan Ba?	Aling Berta	Uncredited	
1991	Shake, Rattle & Roll III	Yaya	Segment: "Yaya"	
1992	Aswang	Old Aswang		
1992	Shake, Rattle & Roll IV	Aling Iya	Segment: "Ang Madre"	
1992	Ali in Wonderland	Aling Iya		
1994	Once Upon a Time in Manila	Naked Old Woman	Uncredited	
1994	Bala at Lipistik	Lola Sepa		
1994	Mars Ravelo's Darna! Ang Pagbabalik	Old Valentina		
1994	Fatima Buen Story	The Omen III	Credited as "Lilia Cantupay"	
1994	Shake, Rattle & Roll V	Woman in the Bathroom	Segment: "Impakto"	
1996	Madrasta	Fides' maid		
1996	May Nagmamahal Sa'yo	Manang Ofel		
1996	Ibong Adarna	Witch	Uncredited	
1996	Magic Temple	Townspeople	Uncredited	
1997	Anak ng Dilim	Komadrona	Uncredited	
1997	Sanggano	Old woman	Credited as "Lydia Cuntapay"	
1998	Curacha ang Babaeng Walang Pahinga	Old woman in church	Credited as "Lilian Cuntapay"	
1998	Babae sa Bubungang Lata	Bangkay		
1998	TatayNic	Old woman		
1999	Isprikitik: Walastik Kung Pumitik	Old woman in bikini		
1999	Brokedown Palace	Old Prisoner		
1999	Dugo ng Birhen: El Kapitan	Witch Doctor		
2000	Pangarap ng Puso	Jose's Grandmother		
2002	I Think I'm in Love	Ising's rival in Trip to Jerusalem		
2002	Bakat	Old Woman		
2002	Lapu-Lapu	Babaylan		
2003	Babae sa Breakwater	Serena		
2003	Spirit Warriors: The Shortcut	Old Ancestral House Ghost		
2005	Bahay ni Lola 2	Old Lady Ghost		
2006	Sukob			
2007	Pasukob	Pacing		
2008	Scaregivers	Tandang Luring		
2008	Photoshoot	Ghost		
2009	Nobody, Nobody But... Juan	Belmont Village Resident	Credited as "Lydia Cuntapay"	
2011	Six Degrees of Separation from Lilia Cuntapay	Herself	Won — Cinema One Originals Digital Film Festival Best Actress; Nominated — Gawad Urian Award for Best Actress	
2011	Segunda Mano	Church Caretaker		
2011	My Lai Four			
2011	Enteng Ng Ina Mo	Old Lover		
2012	Boy Pick-Up: The Movie	Lilia		
2012	Oh My Goth!		Short film	
2012	REquieme!	Aling Isang		
2012	Amorosa	Lulu		
2013	Coming Soon			
2013	Bakit Hindi Ka Crush Ng Crush Mo?			
2014	Echoserang Frog			
2013	Ibong Adarna: The Pinoy Adventure	Bruha		
2014	Kamandag ni Venus			
2015	My Bebe Love	Mrs. Sesmundo	Last film appearance	

== Awards and nominations ==
Year	Work	Organizatiom	Category	Result	Source
2011	Six Degrees of Separation from Lilia Cuntapay	Cinema One Originals	Best Actress (Note: Tied with Maricar Reyes.)	Won	
2011	Six Degrees of Separation from Lilia Cuntapay	Gawad Urian Award	Best Actress	Nominated	
