= Shake, Rattle & Roll V =

1994 Filipino film

- Theatrical release poster
- Directed by: Don Escudero (segment "Episode I: Maligno"); Jose Javier Reyes (segment "Episode II: Anino"); Manny Castañeda (segment "Episode III: Impakto")
- Written by: Jose Javier Reyes
- Produced by: Lily Monteverde
- Starring: Sheryl Cruz; Manilyn Reynes; Ruffa Gutierrez; Chuck Perez; Monsour del Rosario; Tom Taus, Jr.; Jaclyn Jose
- Cinematography: Jun Pereira
- Edited by: Danny Gloria
- Music by: Nonong Buencamino
- Production company: Regal Films
- Distributed by: Regal Films
- Release date: December 25, 1994
- Running time: 104 minutes
- Country: Philippines
- Language: Filipino

Shake, Rattle & Roll V is a 1994 Filipino horror anthology film and the fifth installment of the Shake, Rattle & Roll film series, following the fourth film in 1992. The film was produced and distributed by Regal Films and directed by Don Escudero, Jose Javier Reyes, and Manny Castañeda. It was one of the entries in the 1994 Metro Manila Film Festival.

The film consists of three interconnected stories: a woman on a secluded island is courted by an engkanto who makes her companion sick; a family is terrorized by a murderer's ghost that manifests as a shadow in their new apartment; and two kidnapped siblings trapped in an old hotel must survive a predatory monster. All three segments feature a tarot reader at the beginning of each segment giving advises to many of the protagonists before their supernatural encounters.

The sixth installment, Shake, Rattle & Roll VI, was released in 1997.

== Plot ==
=== "Maligno" ===
Madam Ceres, a tarot reader, advises Laurie about the consequences of her beauty.

One day, Laurie and her friend, Nicky take a vacation on a secluded island with their helpers, Mang Isko and Aling Sela. On the day they are supposed to leave, their boat never comes and there is no other way to contact them. In an argument, Laurie leaves Nicky and goes into the woods. Before she ventures further, she is spotted by Mang Isko who stops her from going in even more. Laurie talks to Aling Sela at her house. Laurie tells her about the woods but Aling Sela talks to her that she shouldn't go back as well.

That night, Laurie goes back into the woods, and encounters a man playing an instrument. He gestures for her to come with him. Before she comes closer, she is spotted by Nicky. Nicky tells her that they should go back and sleep, while the man suddenly disappears. The next day, Laurie wakes up to find that Nicky has grown ill. He is treated by Aling Basyon, the island's healer. When Laurie tells Mang Isko and Aling Sela what happened, Aling Basyon advises her not to go back, never go with the man and never eat his food, because he is not actually a human.

In an act of desperation, Laurie decides to ask for the man's help. She finds him at the same tree he was at during the previous night. He tells her to follow him to a healer. While traveling through the woods, Laurie asks for the man's name, correctly guessing that the name is Victor. When they arrive at a house in the woods, they go inside. Victor tells her about his home and that they should rest before talking about Nicky. Laurie, suspicious, turns down his offer to live in the house. Victor insists that they should stay and eat, giving Laurie a grape. Laurie refuses and escapes, much to Victor's dismay. He then turns into his real form.

When Laurie arrives back home, Aling Basyon tells her that it's Victor who caused Nicky's illness because he wants to take Laurie away. He appears in appealing form to Laurie, in order to take her away. Aling warns that everything Laurie sees is fake. However, Victor is an immortal being who outlives those he has been with, as seen when Aling Basyon guides Laurie into a cave filled with the bones of Victor's victims. He warns Laurie to be cautious of him. At night, Aling Basyon tries to help Nicky again, only to find that critters are living inside him and that his condition is getting worse.

During this, all of them hear Victor's whispers. In response, Laurie decides to stop him once and for all. When Laurie decides to call Victor's name, she is suddenly transported into his house. Victor tells her that Nicky will only go back to normal if Laurie decides to live with him forever. Laurie refuses and to hurt her any longer.

When Laurie goes back to the house, she is greeted with a cured Nicky and they celebrate after stopping the curse.

=== "Anino" ===
Madam Ceres asks Gina to be patient with her older sister, Mowie.

One day, Mowie and Gina along with their cousin, Elmer and the houseboy, Mitoy, rent a house. When Gina's friend senses a feeling in the house, Gina becomes curious. Throughout their stay, each member of the household starts feeling the weird sense. Mitoy quits his job because of this. Gina and Elmer ask the neighbor about the history of the house and it turns out that the previous owner was killed by his wife in self-defense. The two siblings tell Mowie, who was reluctant before, that the house is haunted, Mowie insists that they couldn't afford to move out right away. The same night, Mowie lets Gina sleep in her room, but a loud pound is heard by the door. The two sisters refused to answer and the murder in the form of a shadow attacks Elmer instead and knocks him out. Mowie and Gina open the door and finally see the shadow that has been haunting them. Both of them are attacked but managed to escape the room. They wake Elmer up to get out of the house. As they reach outside with their neighbors who are watching and helping them break out. The shadow is last seen inside Mowie's room.

=== "Impakto" ===
Lizbeth is warned by Madam Ceres about the people in her life who might be a traitor.

Two rich opposite siblings, Lizbeth and Charlie are kidnapped with the help of their driver and his two accomplices. But when their car breaks down in the middle of the night, the kidnappers decided to stay in an old abandoned hotel to hide and await for sunrise. Unbeknownst to them, Andres the Impakto is residing in the area. He previously killed a woman before their arrival, and Pido, a homeless man witnesses it. When the three kidnappers are killed by the Impakto, Lizbeth and Charlie are lost in the hotel and they meet Andres who introduced himself as the owner of the hotel. However, they find out that Andres is an Impakto who is after them, they escape with the help of Pido who confronts and defeats Andres. As the sun rises, Lizbeth and Charlie, and Pido part ways and leave the hotel. Andres appears again, seemingly alive and healthy.

=== Epilogue ===
Gina decides to visit Madam Ceres again, only to discover that the Madam Ceres she spoke with before is dead. Her sister, the real Madam Ceres and also a tarot reader, reveals this to her.

== Cast ==
- Cita Astals as Madam Ceres
- Malou Crisologo as Madam Ceres II

=== Maligno ===
- Ruffa Gutierrez as Laurie
- Monsour del Rosario as Victor
- Bong Regala as Nicky
- Angel Confiado as Mang Isko
- Rustica Carpio† as Aling Sela
- Aida Carmona as Aling Basyon

=== Anino ===
- Sheryl Cruz as Gina
- Jaclyn Jose† as Mowie
- Ogie Diaz as Mitoy
- Patrick Riego de Dios as Alan
- Dingdong Dantes as Elmer
- Ana Abad Santos as Kaye
- Eva Darren as Mrs. Pineda
- Len Ag Santos as Alice Chua
- George Lim as Rod Chua
- Cherry Cornel as Evelyn
- Oscar Moran as Anino

=== Impakto ===
- Manilyn Reynes as Lizbeth
- Chuck Perez as Andres
- Tom Taus, Jr. as Charlie
- Michelle Ortega as Andres' girlfriend
- Archie Adamos as kidnapper
- Nonong de Andres as Pido
- Don Pepot as Dencio
- Lilia Cuntapay† as the corpse in the bathroom
- Romy Romulo as kidnapper

== Accolades ==
Year	Award-Giving Body	Category	Recipient	Result
1994	Metro Manila Film Festival	Best Child Performer	Tom Taus, Jr.	Won

== See also ==
- Shake, Rattle & Roll (film series)
- List of ghost films
