= Shake, Rattle & Roll 2k5 =

2005 Filipino film

- Theatrical release poster
- Directed by: Uro Q. dela Cruz (segment "Poso"); Rico Maria Ilarde (segment "Aquarium"); Richard Somes (segment "Lihim ng San Joaquin")
- Screenplay by: Joven Tan (segments "Poso" and "Lihim ng San Joaquin"); Dondon Monteverde (segment "Poso"); Aloy Adlawan (segment "Aquarium"); Rico Maria Ilarde (segment "Aquarium"); Richard Somes (segment "Lihim ng San Joaquin")
- Story by: Joven Tan (segment "Poso"); Dondon Monteverde (segment "Poso"); Aloy Adlawan (segment "Aquarium"); Rico Maria Ilarde (segment "Aquarium"); Richard Somes (segment "Lihim ng San Joaquin")
- Produced by: Lily Y. Monteverde; Dondon Monteverde; Roselle Monteverde-Teo; Dave Hukom
- Starring: Ai-Ai delas Alas; Gloria Romero; Yasmien Kurdi; Rainier Castillo; Marco Alcaraz; Biboy Ramirez; Jenine Desiderio; Ara Mina; Ogie Alcasid; Wilma Doesnt; Reggie Curley; Paul Salas; Mark Anthony Fernandez; Tanya Garcia; Elizabeth Oropesa; Nonie Buencamino; Ronnie Lazaro
- Cinematography: Nap Jamir (segments "Poso" and "Lihim ng San Joaquin"); Louie Quirino (segment "Aquarium")
- Edited by: Jay Halili; Dave Hukom
- Music by: Von de Guzman
- Production companies: Regal Entertainment; Reality Entertainment; Ignite Media
- Distributed by: Regal Home Video
- Release date: December 25, 2005
- Running time: 110 minutes
- Country: Philippines
- Language: Filipino

Shake, Rattle & Roll 2k5 (also known as Shake, Rattle & Roll VII or Shake, Rattle & Roll 7) is a 2005 Filipino comedy horror anthology film produced by Regal Entertainment, and the only installment in the series to be co-produced by Reality Entertainment (now known as Reality MM Studios). It is the seventh installment of the Shake, Rattle & Roll film series after an 8-year hiatus since the sixth film, and an official entry to the 2005 Metro Manila Film Festival.

The film consists of three segments: a fake occultist visit an old woman's house and encounters a cursed water pump; a family discovered that an abandoned aquarium left in their condo is inhabited by evil spirits; and a married couple who travel to a village and discover that the townspeople are aswang.

The eighth installment, Shake, Rattle and Roll 8, was released in 2006.

== Plot ==
=== "Poso" ===
An unnamed Ispiritista, a fake occultist, retires from the business of communicating with the dead when her last job goes terribly wrong. When a wealthy grandmother promises the Ispiritista and her group; Jay, Gener, and Frida a huge fee to contact her dead grandson Lucas, they immediately accept and take it as their last job. The grandmother wants to talk to Lucas the next day, because it will be his death anniversary.

After strange and paranormal occurrences haunt them at midnight, the Ispiritista, along with Laila, the grandmother's caretaker, found out that Lucas was killed by his grandmother, and was buried alive under the construction of the waterpump. Lucas' spirit then drags the grandmother into a pool of blood.

The Ispiritista, Jay, and Laila successfully escape but realize that Frida and Gener fell victim to the waterpump.

=== "Aquarium" ===
Janice and her husband Benjie, along with their son Paul and their maid Aciana, just moved into a new condo unit. Janice discovers an aquarium with a mask left behind by the previous tenants. She becomes suspicious, but Benjie and Paul are intrigued. Janice later sees a mysterious old lady warning her not to touch the aquarium. At midnight, while Janice is taking a bath, she notices a monstrous hand peeking through the door, but it quickly disappears. After her bath, she is shocked to find a couple of goldfish in the toilet, but when Benjie arrives and she tells him what happened, the goldfish are gone.

One day, the old lady returns and once again warns Janice not to touch the aquarium. When Janice enters their unit, she notices that the ceiling is leaking. In Paul's bedroom, she sees that Benjie and Paul have already filled the aquarium with water, and she becomes more suspicious when she notices goldfish swimming inside. That midnight, as Janice and Benjie are asleep, water from the leaking ceiling drips onto her. She notices wet footprints leading to Paul's room. Upon entering, she finds all the goldfish dead and screams in horror. Benjie calls Alex, the local plumber, to fix the leak. Janice tries to dispose of the dead goldfish, but they suddenly come back to life. At that moment, she sees the old lady again, telling her to destroy the aquarium for good. Janice follows the old lady to her room and calls out to her, but there is no response.

As Alex works on fixing the leak, seaweeds come to life and began to emerge from the aquarium, causing his ladder to shake. When he falls and reaches for his flashlight, the seaweeds pull his arm into the aquarium. Meanwhile, the monstrous hand reappears behind Paul, who is in the bathtub, and begins to drown him. At the same time, Alex drowns as well. Janice manages to save Paul, but they hear Aciana scream when she discovers Alex's drowned body, causing Janice to scream in terror.

The police arrive to investigate Alex's death. Janice tries to explain to Benjie about the old lady's warnings, but a policeman tells them that no one has lived in that unit for years. Later, when Aciana is putting Paul to sleep, the old lady appears behind the door, staring and slowly approaching Paul. Paul, scared, tells Janice that the old lady said she and her son were drowned by her husband in the aquarium and are now seeking revenge. Determined to end it, Janice decides to destroy the aquarium and grabs a rubber mallet. She asks Aciana to take the mask out of their unit, but as Aciana holds it, the mask suddenly attacks her, possessing her body.

As water from the aquarium starts flooding Paul's room, Paul tries to open the door but finds it jammed. As he screams for help, Janice tries to break the door open but is interrupted by the possessed Aciana, who forcefully throws her to the ground. Benjie arrives at the condo to see what is happening. Inside the flooded bedroom, Paul encounters a creature that resembles a Siyokoy emerging from the water, revealed to be the old lady's drowned son. Benjie knocks Aciana out with a vase just as she nearly kills Janice. Janice tells him Paul is still trapped inside. Benjie climbs through the vent into the bedroom and destroys the aquarium, causing a portal to open and suck out all the water and the creature. In the end, Janice, Benjie, and their son reconcile.

=== "Lihim ng San Joaquin" ===
A married couple settle on a village so isolated that even the carabao cart driver refused to enter, leaving them to walk to the town on their own. They were then welcomed by the villagers, who, unbeknownst to them are aswangs. As the couple starts to notice the dark secrets behind the villagers and a man who warns them that he became a slave to the villagers, they try to leave the village only to be surrounded by the aswangs.

They fend off the aswangs, as they eventually exit the village, but not after killing aswangs, including the leader.

After killing the leader of the aswangs, the couple now exit the village.

== Cast ==
=== Poso ===
- Ai-Ai delas Alas as The Ispiritista
- Gloria Romero† as Lola
- Rainier Castillo as Jay
- Yasmien Kurdi as Laila
- Marco Alcaraz as Gener
- Biboy Ramirez as Lucas
- Jenine Desiderio as Frida

=== Aquarium ===
- Ara Mina as Janice
- Ogie Alcasid as Benjie
- Paul Salas as Paul
- Wilma Doesnt as Aciana
- Reggie Curley as Alex
- Lui Manansala as Matandang Babae

=== Lihim ng San Joaquin ===
- Mark Anthony Fernandez as Rene
- Tanya Garcia as Rene's wife
- Elizabeth Oropesa as Sael's wife
- Nonie Buencamino as Sael
- Ronnie Lazaro as Blind Man
- Jess Evardone as Magsasaka

== Accolades ==
Year	Award-Giving Body	Category	Recipient	Result
2005	Metro Manila Film Festival	Best Child Performer	Paul Salas	Won

== Reception ==
The film earned 32.171 million pesos at the conclusion of the Metro Manila Film Festival earning it the top five slot in the festival's lineup.

== See also ==
- Shake, Rattle & Roll (film series)
- List of ghost films
