= Shake, Rattle & Roll XV =

2014 Filipino film

- Theatrical release poster
- Directed by: Dondon S. Santos (segment "Ahas"); Jerrold Tarog (segment "Ulam"); Perci Intalan (segment "Flight 666")
- Screenplay by: Rody Vera (segment "Ahas"); Zig Marasigan (segment "Ulam"); Jerrold Tarog (segment "Ulam"); Evie Macapugay (segment "Flight 666"); Renei Dimla (segment "Flight 666"); Perci Intalan (segment "Flight 666")
- Produced by: Lily Y. Monteverde; Roselle Monteverde
- Starring: Erich Gonzales; JC de Vera; Dennis Trillo; Carla Abellana; Lovi Poe; Matteo Guidicelli; John Lapus
- Cinematography: Manuel Teehankee (segment "Ahas"); Mackie Galvez (segment "Ulam"); Mo Zee (segment "Flight 666")
- Edited by: Ludwig Peralta (segment "Ahas"); Jerrold Tarog (segment "Ulam"); Benjamin Tolentino (segments "Ulam" & "Flight 666")
- Music by: Francis Concio (segment "Ahas"); Michael Abadam (segment "Ahas"); Jerrold Tarog (segment "Ulam"); Von de Guzman (segment "Flight 666")
- Production company: Regal Entertainment
- Release date: December 25, 2014
- Running time: 127 minutes
- Country: Philippines
- Language: Filipino

Shake, Rattle & Roll XV is a 2014 Filipino horror anthology film directed by Dondon Santos, Jerrold Tarog, and Perci Intalan, and the fifteenth installment of the Shake, Rattle & Roll film series, following the fourteenth film in 2012. The film stars an ensemble cast including Erich Gonzales, JC de Vera, Carla Abellana, Dennis Trillo, Lovi Poe, Matteo Guidicelli, and John Lapus. The film was produced by Regal Entertainment, and is an official entry in the 40th Metro Manila Film Festival. The sixteenth installment, Shake, Rattle & Roll Extreme, was released in 2023 after a 9-year hiatus.

The film has three segments: a couple encounters a female human-snake hybrid in a mall; a husband and wife eat meals infested with pests that turn them into monsters; and airplane passengers are attacked by a tiyanak.

It is the first Filipino full-length film to be shot inside a real airplane, which served as the setting for the third segment, "Flight 666". Regal Entertainment has claimed that Shake, Rattle & Roll XV was the most expensive installment in the film series, though the studio has not revealed the numerical figure.

== Plot ==
=== "Ahas" ===
The episode is a retelling of the urban legend about the human-snake hybrid said to live underneath Robinsons Galleria.

Troy's wife Adela is locked inside a dressing room at Alegria Mall and is attacked by a half-human, half-snake creature. Troy later wakes from a nightmare about her attack. Meanwhile, fashion designer Iggy Moda prepares a fashion event for the mall's 25th anniversary and plans to use the legend of the creature as part of the celebration. Sandra Alegria returns from the United States to become the head of the mall company, while denying rumours that she has a twin sister who is half-snake.

A shoplifter is killed by the creature, Sarah, after being locked inside a dressing room. Sarah becomes obsessed with Troy after seeing him at the mall. As the mall closes, janitor Mang Banjo discovers Sarah's hidden chamber and barely escapes. Sarah later kills a security guard named Jake after he mistakes her for Sandra.

Sandra and her father Alberto learn that Sarah has escaped. Alberto reveals that Sarah and Sandra are twin sisters, born after he secretly gave their Christian mother, Lourdes, a potion said to bring good luck. Believing Sarah to be cursed, Lourdes wanted her killed, but Alberto kept her hidden beneath the mall because he believed she would bring good fortune to the family business. Sandra had secretly visited Sarah during their childhood.

During the anniversary event, Iggy unveils a statue based on the half-human, half-snake legend. Fearing that it will damage the mall's reputation, Alberto orders him to remove it. Alberto and Sandra confront Sarah in her chamber, where Sarah becomes enraged after learning that she was excluded from the anniversary celebration. She attacks them and kills Alberto.

Troy enters the chamber and stabs Sarah, forcing him, Sandra and Mang Banjo to escape. After learning that Sarah killed Adela, Troy returns to confront her. Sandra attempts to reason with Sarah, but Troy's attack fails and Sarah swallows him whole. While inside Sarah, Troy kills her and cuts his way out, emerging alive. Troy then finds Adela's bracelet inside Sarah's body, leaving him distraught over his wife's death. As he is about to leave, Sandra is left heartbroken over the death of her sister.

=== "Ulam" ===
Henry and Aimee, a cold couple, move with their daughter Julie and dog Tiny into the old mansion of Henry's deceased grandparents, Amah Choleng and Angkong Cesar. They are welcomed by Lina, the family's longtime caretaker. The mansion had been mostly abandoned after Henry's relatives migrated abroad, leaving him responsible for the ancestral house. Aimee is immediately uncomfortable with the mansion and suspicious of Lina, especially after finding a lizard in food she prepared. That night, Aimee experiences a disturbing transformation into a lizard-like creature.

The following day, Henry takes Julie to her new school while Aimee remains at the mansion. Her friend Iggy Moda, who survived the events at Alegria Mall, visits her and learns about Henry's family history. Aimee explains that Amah Choleng was a strict believer in Chinese superstitions who opposed her relationship with Henry because he was born in the Year of the Dog while Aimee was born in the Year of the Dragon, which she considered a curse. When Aimee became pregnant, Amah Choleng forced Henry to choose between his family and his wife. Henry chose Aimee and left the mansion, while their daughter Julie was later born in the Year of the Rat.

Lina's cooking gradually affects the family. Tiny goes missing, while Henry develops an unusual craving for Lina's food. At school, Julie nearly eats food prepared by Lina before other students steal it from her and discover what appears to be rat remains inside. Henry and Aimee's relationship continues to deteriorate, and both begin experiencing visions in which they see each other as different people or creatures. Henry eventually transforms into a dog-like creature, while Aimee's condition worsens and leads to a violent incident at the hospital.

As Aimee escapes from the hospital, Henry returns to the mansion with Julie and becomes increasingly controlled by Lina's cooking. Lina is revealed to have killed Tiny and used his remains as food. Julie also discovers a strange human-like creature living inside the mansion. Iggy returns to warn Henry and investigates Lina's activities, but is attacked by the creature.

Lina's past is revealed. She was secretly the lover of Angkong Cesar, which enraged Amah Choleng. After Lina became pregnant with Cesar's child, Amah Choleng poisoned her, causing the unborn child to become severely mutated. Lina raised the mutated child in secret inside the mansion. After Amah Choleng and Cesar died and their family scattered, Lina remained behind and planned her revenge against their descendants.

When Henry's family returned to the mansion, Lina used her cooking to infect them, exploiting their fears and Chinese zodiac signs to turn them against one another. Her goal was to make the family suffer the same loss and misery she had experienced.

Aimee eventually returns to the mansion as Lina's revenge reaches its climax. Henry and Aimee, nearly consumed by their altered states, fight each other while Julie watches. When Lina's mutated son attacks Julie, the couple regain their sanity and unite against the creature. Henry kills Lina's son, enraging Lina, who kills him. The family is left devastated as Lina's revenge finally comes to an end.

=== "Flight 666" ===
Dave boards Manila Air Flight 666, traveling from Manila to Zamboanga. On board are two vloggers and rockstars band Eli and Gino, who are flying to their home province for a concert; their fans, best friends Adam and Lovely coincidentally board the flight. Also among the passengers are celebrity vlogger and television show host Tim, socialite father and son Macoy and Macky, baggage handling supervisor Carlos, young woman Jane, who is pregnant, along with her grandmother Juling, and Iggy Moda, who survived the events at the mansion. In the first class cabin are socialite Connie and married couple Brandon and Miranda. Passengers are welcomed by flight attendant Bryan and are accommodated by co-flight attendants Pamela and Karen. Karen suddenly bumps into Dave, her ex-boyfriend, and apologizes for their past, but Dave ignores her.

While the plane takes off, Juling insists Jane to pretend that she fell in love with a foreigner as soon as they arrive home, which later turns out that she fell in love with a creature and is the father of their baby "tiyanak". After the plane reaches its cruising altitude, Carlos instigates a hijacking, interrogating the crew in the flight deck in protest over the airline laying off employees as part of cost-cutting strategy and demands the airline wire money to compensate for the affected parties. Connie overhears the chaos and hides in one of the lavatories only to find the couple doing a mile high club, whom she urges to calm down and stop their acts out of fear of being killed. Meanwhile, Jane gives birth to her baby creature and suddenly passes out along with the baby. The plane suddenly goes into a short turbulence and faints almost everyone on board, except for Juling, who dies. Unknown to them, the creature lurks out and scratches some of the passengers. Karen later overhears a conversation between Carlos and Pamela, which she realizes Pamela helps in making Carlos' plans succeed.

In the lavatory, Miranda fights with Connie until the tiyanak comes out of nowhere and kills Brandon, Connie, Miranda and the rest of the passengers on board one by one, including Pamela, Eli, Macoy and Macky and another passenger. The remaining passengers seek safety, except for Adam. Capt. Robert Francisco tasks Bryan and Officer Charlie to check on the situation on board. Meanwhile, Adam is strangled by the creature's umbilical cord while Carlos fights the creature with a gun and is killed by it. The creature attacks the flight deck and strangles the pilot. Karen, Bryan, Dave and the remaining passengers make a plan to safety as Tim and Bryan fly the plane after losing the pilots. Gino and Lovely discovers a bomb planted underneath the seats by Carlos which is ready to detonate. Karen finds the child on the floor and picks it up, while Dave throws it away from her before it transforms again into a tiyanak. Karen, Dave, Gino and Lovely run out to safety, but the creature traps Karen and Dave. Coincidentally, Iggy wakes up and is attacked by the creature.

After the flight lands safely, the creature attacks again and kills Lovely. Karen, Dave, Gino, Tim and Bryan escape the plane as it explodes, killing the creature. As the survivors tell their story to the authorities, Karen and Dave walk away together as the father of the creature vengefully appears behind them in the distance. In the mid-credit scene, Iggy is shown to have survived the explosion.

== Cast ==
- John Lapus as Iggy Moda

=== Ahas ===
- Erich Gonzales as Sandra/Sarah
- JC de Vera as Troy
- Ariel Rivera as Alberto
- Lou Veloso as Badjo
- Alice Dixson as Lourdes
- Giselle Canlas as Jinny
- Melai Cantiveros as Julie
- Jason Francisco as Jake
- Yassi Benitez as Secretary
- Angie Ferro† as Albularyo
- Mosang as Saleslady 1
- Anne Monique Villanueva as Saleslady 2
- Paolo Gumabao as Model 1
- Ma. Bencelle Banzon as Model 2
- Kirst Viray as Model 3
- Janelle Tee as Model 4
- Solenn Heussaff as Adela

=== Ulam ===
- Dennis Trillo as Henry
- Carla Abellana as Aimee
- Chanda Romero as Aling Lina
  - Anna Luna as young Lina
- Perla Bautista as Amah Choleng
  - Cris Villonco as young Amah
- Kryshee Grengia as Julie
- Virgilio Que as Angkong Cesar
  - Richard Quan as young Angkong
- Yogo Singh as Paolo
- Rhederlee Orjaliza as Tabloid-Reading Mom
- Iana Marie Abrogena as Nurse at Reception
- Brenda Porcadilla as Midwife

=== Flight 666 ===
- Lovi Poe as Karen
- Matteo Guidicelli as Dave
- Daniel Matsunaga as Bryan
- Bernard Palanca as Carlos
- Kiray Celis as Lovely
- IC Mendoza as Adam
- Kim Atienza as Tim
- Nathalie Hart as Pamela
- Lui Manansala as Lola Juling
- Ria Garcia as Jane
- Khalil Ramos as Gino
- Yael Yuzon as Eli
- Bentong† as Macoy
- Betong Sumaya as Macky
- Rolando Inocencio as Capt. Robert Francisco
- Joy Viado† as Connie
- John Spainhour as Brandon
- Arlene Muhlach as Miranda
- Sue Prado† as Norma
- Ken Alfonso as First Officer Charlie
- Rocky Salumbides as Maligno/Tiyanak's father

== Production ==
Maja Salvador was originally chosen for the lead role in the "Ahas" segment, until she was replaced by Erich Gonzales. The snake-skin costume for the character of Gonzales measures 20 feet long and takes about five hours to fully apply the costume's prosthetics onto her. Almost the whole segment of "Flight 666" was shot on board a retired Philippine Airlines Airbus A330 parked at Villamor Airbase. Lovi Poe, the leading actress of the segment, stated that they filmed it while the plane was flying.

== Release ==
=== Box office ===
Shake, Rattle & Roll XV opened at 6th place in the box office out of the eight films in the 40th Metro Manila Film Festival.

== Accolades ==
=== Awards and nominations ===
Award-Giving Body	Category	Recipient	Result
40th Metro Manila Film Festival	Best Float	Shake, Rattle & Roll XV	Nominated
40th Metro Manila Film Festival	Best Sound Recording	Lamberto Casas Jr. ("Ulam" episode)	Nominated
40th Metro Manila Film Festival	Best Musical Score	Von De Guzman ("Flight 666" episode)	Nominated
40th Metro Manila Film Festival	Best Child Performer	Kryshee Grengia ("Ulam" episode)	Nominated
40th Metro Manila Film Festival	Best Make Up Artist	"Ulam" episode	Nominated
40th Metro Manila Film Festival	Best Visual Effects	Imaginary Friends ("Ahas" episode)	Nominated
40th Metro Manila Film Festival	Best Editor	Benjamin Tolentino ("Flight 666" episode)	Nominated
40th Metro Manila Film Festival	Best Supporting Actress	Chanda Romero ("Ulam" episode)	Nominated
40th Metro Manila Film Festival	Best Director	Jerrold Tarog ("Ulam" episode)	Nominated
40th Metro Manila Film Festival	Best Actress	Erich Gonzales ("Ahas" episode), Carla Abellana ("Ulam" episode)	Nominated

== See also ==
- Shake, Rattle & Roll (film series)
- List of ghost films
