= Tiyanak (film) =

1988 Filipino horror film directed by Peque Gallaga & Lorenzo A. Reyes

- Official movie poster
- Directed by: Peque Gallaga; Lorenzo A. Reyes
- Written by: Peque Gallaga; Don Escudero; Lorenzo A. Reyes
- Produced by: Jenny Luber
- Starring: Janice de Belen; Lotlot de Leon; Ramon Christopher; Mary Walter; Chuckie Dreyfus; Carmina Villarroel; Rudolph Yaptinchay; Smokey Manaloto
- Cinematography: Eduardo F. Jacinto
- Edited by: Augusto Salvador
- Music by: Dionisio Buencamino Jr.
- Production company: Regal Films
- Release date: September 15, 1988
- Running time: 122 minutes
- Country: Philippines
- Language: Filipino

Tiyanak is a 1988 Filipino horror film directed by Peque Gallaga and Lorenzo A. Reyes from a story and screenplay they co-written with Don Escudero, based on the mythical creature of the same name. It stars Janice de Belen, Lotlot de Leon, Ramon Christopher, Mary Walter, Chuckie Dreyfus, Carmina Villarroel, Rudolph Yaptinchay, and Smokey Manaloto.

Tiyanak was released by Regal Films on September 15, 1988. Though other critics were disappointed with the film, Tiyanak received praise from Lav Diaz for being remarkably frightening. Eduardo Jacinto won the Film Academy of the Philippines Award for Best Cinematography.

== Cast ==
- Janice de Belen as Julie
- Lotlot de Leon as Christie
- Ramon Christopher as Jojo
- Mary Walter
- Chuckie Dreyfus as Aries
- Carmina Villarroel as Monica
- Rudolph Yaptinchay as Mars
- Smokey Manaloto
- Bella Flores
- Betty Mae Piccio
- Eva Ramos
- Suzanne Gonzales
- Mae Ann Adonis
- Bonafe
- Zorayda Sanchez as Telyang Bayawak

== Production ==
Location shooting was held in San Pablo, Laguna.

== Critical response ==
The film received negative reviews from critics. Mario Hernando, film critic for the television program Movie Magazine, gave the film two stars out of five. Meg Mendoza of the Manila Standard was more negative, writing that the film had predictable and manipulative horror scenes, as well as tedious pacing, though she commended the special effects and the performances of Villarroel and Manaloto. Overall, Mendoza expressed disappointment, stating that "we could hardly believe it was directed by award-winning director Peque Gallaga, who gave us the magnum opus Oro, Plata, Mata.

However, Lav Diaz, who also wrote for the Manila Standard, gave high praises to the film, stating that "films like Tiyanak, even when it is horror, are the ones that will save or contribute quality to the development of Filipino cinema.... One thing that elevates this film is its success in achieving its ambition – to scare. [It is] really scary."

In 2000, historian Ambeth Ocampo stated that "[Tiyanak] is a horror film so camp and funny it is downright memorable."

== Accolades ==
Group	Category	Name	Result
Film Academy of the Philippines Awards	Best Cinematography	Eduardo Jacinto	Won
