= Joanne Santos-Quintas =

Filipino actress (born 1976)

Joanne Santos
- Born: Joanne Zapanta Santos; October 27, 1976 (age 50); Manila, Philippines
- Other names: Joanne Quintas; Joanne Quintas-Primero; Joanne Santos Primero; Joanne Santos Quintas-Primero; Josa Primero
- Occupation: Actress
- Years active: 1994–2011
- Known for: Binibining Pilipinas 1995 (Winner - Binibining Pilipinas Universe 1995); Miss Universe 1995 (Unplaced); Miss Tourism International 1997 (Winner)
- Height: 1.78 m (5 ft 10 in)
- Title: Binibining Pilipinas Universe 1995; Miss Tourism International 1997; Mrs. Philippines World 2003
- Spouse: Domini Primero (m. 1998)
- Children: 3

Joanne Zapanta Santos-Quintas (born October 27, 1976) is a Filipino actress and beauty pageant titleholder who won the Binibining Pilipinas Universe 1995 at the age of 18. She then participated in Miss Universe 1995.

== Early life ==
Prior to Binibining Pilipinas, Quintas started her modeling career at age 12, becoming the image of Filipino clothing company Pink Soda and appearing in the film Massacre Files in 1994.

== Binibining Pilipinas ==
After actress Charlene Gonzales' Top 6 Finish at Miss Universe 1994 and Ruffa Gutierrez's Second Runner-up placement at Miss World 1993, Quintas aimed to replicate their success stories in her country's national beauty pageant, Binibining Pilipinas, participating at age 18.

She succeeded in her efforts and was crowned Binibining Pilipinas 1995 on March 12, gaining the right to represent her country in Miss Universe 1995.

== Miss Universe ==
As the official representative of her country to the 1995 Miss Universe pageant, broadcast live from Windhoek, Namibia on May 12, 1995, she placed 16th in the preliminary competition, coming 9th in the preliminary evening gown event.

== Life after Binibining Pilipinas ==
Quintas continued working as a model and actress in several television shows and movies, never forgetting her success as a beauty queen, winning the titles of Miss Tourism International 1997 and Mrs. Philippines World in 2003.

A decade after she started modeling, she married Domini Primero and has three children with him: Rafael, Mulawin and Mayumi. In 2006, she started studying photography, later becoming famous for her work behind the camera.

In 2009, she was involved in a minor controversy with political candidate Joey Marquez when they were seen together as part of her work as a photographer for his political campaign. Both parties clarified the situation and moved on with their lives.

== Filmography ==
=== Film ===
Year	Title	Role
1994	Massacre Files	
1994	Seth Cortiza	
1996	Pia	
1996	Daddy's Angel	Bettina Lacuesta
1996	Vampira	Judith
1997	Shake, Rattle & Roll VI	Mabel Laroza

=== Television ===
Year	Title	Role
1996–99	Anna Karenina	Melissa Cruz
1999	Pintados	Alex
1999	D! Day	Guest
2007	Impostora	Sofia
2008	Obra: Daady Dearest	Gia
2008	Codename: Asero	Gelyn Abesamis
2009	Ang Babaeng Hinugot sa Aking Tadyang	Sylvia Torres
2009	All About Eve	Marissa
2009	Sine Novela: Kung Aagawin Mo Ang Lahat Sa Akin	Romina Samaniego
2010	Langit sa Piling Mo	Bianca Ocampo

Awards and achievements
Preceded by Charlene Gonzales	Binibining Pilipinas Universe; 1995	Succeeded by Aileen Damiles
