= Don Escudero =

- Born: Placido Escudero; January 27, 1955; Tiaong, Quezon, Philippines
- Died: July 11, 2011 (aged 56); The Medical City, Pasig, Philippines
- Occupations: director, writer
- Known for: Manong Don

Placido Escudero, known as Don Escudero (January 27, 1955 – July 11, 2011), was a Filipino movie writer, actor, and director.

== Life and career ==
Escudero was born on January 27, 1955, in Tiaong, Quezon. He graduated from De La Salle University, San Juan. He started in entertainment as an assistant, working with Lino Brocka, Ishmael Bernal and Mike de Leon.

Escudero was diagnosed with cancer and went through two years of treatments and had a remission before dying. He was survived by his mother Millie, brothers Manolet and Ugi and sister Mari. Escudero designed his own cremation urn kept at the chapel of the family-owned Villa Escudero in Tiaong, Quezon.

== Filmography ==
=== Production designer ===
Year	Title	Notes
1980	Tanikala	
1980	Brutal	
1981	Kamakalawa	
1981	Boystown	
1982	Oro, Plata, Mata	
1984	Misteryo sa Tuwa	
1984	Shake, Rattle and Roll	"Manananggal" segment
1985	Virgin Forest	
1985	Scorpio Nights	
1986	Unfaithful Wife	
1987	Once Upon a Time	
1988	Hiwaga sa Balete Drive	
1988	Tiyanak	
1989	Isang Araw, Walang Diyos	
1990	Shake, Rattle & Roll II	
1991	Adventures of Gary Leon at Kuting	
1991	Shake, Rattle & Roll III	
1992	Aswang	
1992	Shake, Rattle & Roll IV	
1993	Dugo ng Panday	
1994	Multo in the City	

=== Director ===
Year	Title	Notes
1994	Multo in the City	
1995	Hindi Magbabago	
1995	Shake, Rattle & Roll V	"Episode I: Maligno" segment
1996	Taguan	
1996	Impakto	
1997	Laging Naroon Ka	
1997	Halik	
2000	Nag-Aapoy Na Laman	
2000	Tugatog	
2000	Arayyy	
