= Shake, Rattle and Roll 8 =

2006 Filipino film

- DVD cover
- Directed by: Rahyan Q. Carlos (segment "13th Floor"); Topel Lee (segment "Yaya"); Michael Tuviera (segment "LRT")
- Screenplay by: Fairlane Raymundo (segments "13th Floor", "Yaya", "LRT"); Edzon Rapisora (segment "13th Floor"); Iris Saldavia-Aniban (segment "Yaya"); Ben Cho (segment "Yaya"); Lorenzo Valdez (segment "LRT")
- Story by: Roselle Monteverde-Teo (segments "13th Floor", "Yaya", "LRT"); Fairlane Raymundo (segments "13th Floor", "Yaya", "LRT"); Edzon Rapisora (segment "13th Floor"); Iris Saldavia-Aniban (segment "Yaya"); Ben Cho (segment "Yaya"); Lorenzo Valdez (segment "LRT")
- Produced by: Roselle Monteverde-Teo; Lily Y. Monteverde
- Starring: Sheryl Cruz; Manilyn Reynes; Keempee de Leon; Iza Calzado; Bearwin Meily; TJ Trinidad; Eugene Domingo; Keanna Reeves; Roxanne Guinoo; Joseph Bitangcol; Miko Palanca
- Cinematography: Rodolfo Aves Jr. (segment "13th Floor"); J.A. Tadena (segment "Yaya"); Odyssey Flores (segment "LRT")
- Edited by: Jason Cauman (segment "13th Floor"); Jay Halili (segment "13th Floor"); Miren Alvarez-Fabregas (segment "Yaya"); Ian Hontanosas (segment "Yaya"); Dave Hukom (segment "LRT")
- Music by: Von de Guzman
- Production companies: Regal Entertainment; Regal Multimedia Inc.
- Release date: December 25, 2006
- Running time: 133 minutes
- Country: Philippines
- Language: Filipino
- Box office: ₱57 million (Official 2006 MMFF run)

Shake, Rattle and Roll 8 is a 2006 Filipino horror anthology film directed by Rahyan Q. Carlos, Topel Lee, and Michael Tuviera, and the eighth installment of the Shake, Rattle & Roll film series, following the seventh film in 2005. It is produced by Regal Entertainment, and was an entry to the 2006 Metro Manila Film Festival. The film has three segments: a group of party organizers encounter ghost children at a birthday celebration; a boy discovers his new nanny is a monster; and LRT passengers are attacked by a mutant creature.

The monster from the "LRT" segment is regarded as one of the most memorable creatures featured in Philippine horror cinema.

The ninth installment, Shake, Rattle and Roll 9, was released in 2007.

== Plot ==
=== "13th Floor" ===
On October 14, 1986, a fire caused by a burning paper airplane razes an orphanage, killing the matrons Jene and Ella and all but two of the orphans. Twenty years later, a high-rise condominium stands on the site of the orphanage. In one of the penthouse suites resides a young girl named Alexandra ("Alex") and her parents, Diana and Oscar.

Diana and Oscar decide to throw a party for Alex's 11th birthday, which happens to fall on the 20th anniversary of the fire. When the event organizers, consisting of the head party planner/host Sonny, caterer and chef Marge, assistants Gino and Alyson, and magician/clown Jun arrive at Alex's apartment building, they, particularly Sonny and Jun, suddenly begin to feel the presence of lost souls, starting with their elevator ride.

Upon arrival at Alex's suite, the organizers again experience strange phenomena, but dismiss them in order to focus on setting up the party. The party begins after the guests, consisting of Alex's friends and their two matrons, arrive. Unknown to any of them, the guests were the ghosts of the orphanage fire victims.

The presence of the ghosts threw the party into chaos. The spirits manifest themselves altogether and the original 14th floor where the party was held suddenly becomes the 13th floor. After a chase, the ghosts reappear in the form of the orphans, Ella, and Jene, who reveals that Sonny and Jun were the two orphans who survived the fire at the start of the film and that they were also the ones who started it. Jene also mentioned that Alex has a connection to the fire, being born on October 14, 1995, the ninth anniversary of the incident. Alex, having no siblings and an open third eye, was also revealed to be friends with the orphans' ghosts. The souls then forgive Sonny and Jun before departing for the afterlife.

=== "Yaya" ===
Mischievous child prankster Benjo sends many nannies packing and resigning. When his mother Grace hires a new nanny named Cecille, Benjo promises to stop his pranks. Although things seem normal at first, Benjo grows suspicious of Cecille, especially when the family dog, Toby, barks at her for seemingly no reason. Grace urges Benjo to calm down.

Benjo becomes increasingly watchful and suspicious. At school, he confides in his teacher Mel, suspecting Cecille is a demon. Mel tells Benjo that garlic is the only weapon capable of repelling aswangs.

On the night of a full moon, Cecille transforms into her aswang form and kills house helper Hermie and driver Julio. Benjo escapes with his sister. Grace arrives with Mel just as Cecille closes in on the siblings. Recalling Mel's advice, Benjo thrusts garlic into Cecille's mouth, killing her instantly.

=== "LRT" ===
Thirteen commuters board the last trip of the Manila Light Rail Transit System Line 2 from Katipunan to Santolan, departing near midnight. Onboard, Jean reunites with her ex-boyfriend Cesar and introduces him to her son Jimmy. Meanwhile, a deacon named Lita obnoxiously preaches Bible verses, irritating the passengers.

The train arrives at an abandoned station, which the passengers believe to be the final stop. They discover the station is closed and locked from outside, and attempt to find a telephone booth to call for help. They learn the train had actually reversed to Santolan Depot Workshops, where they find 2000 series train cars under repair.

While searching for a phone, Martin is pulled up onto a balcony, where the group later finds his corpse with his heart removed. Unknown to them, a heart-eating blind creature lurks the station each midnight. Lita is killed by the creature, and Ojie is killed after discovering her body. In a panic, The remaining passengers return to the train but find out that it won't start.

The creature kills more passengers until only Jean, Jimmy, Cesar, Steph, Don, Nina, and Rocky remain. Nina and Rocky manage to escape the station but discover the corpses of previous victims in an old train. The creature kills Rocky while Nina escapes. Steph and Don regroup with Jean, Jimmy, and Cesar but are soon killed by the creature while finding an exit.

Jean, Jimmy, and Cesar find an emergency exit, but Cesar, confessing his continued love for Jean, stays behind to fend off the creature. After a long fight, he is killed. Jean and Jimmy escape and run into the police, explaining the horrors that have occurred. They are taken to a precinct and confined in a cell with Nina. It is revealed that the creature is the mutant son of the police chief, and the passengers of the last train each night are fed to the creature. The three scream as the creature approaches. A group of janitors clean and remove traces of blood at the station as the film concludes.

== Cast ==
=== 13th Floor ===
- Bearwin Meily as Sonny
- Janus del Prado as Jun
- Keanna Reeves as Marge
- Roxanne Guinoo as Alyson
- Joseph Bitangcol as Gino
- Krystal Reyes as Alex
- Robert Seña as Oscar
- Isay Alvarez as Diana
- Aaron Junatas as Ghost Kid

=== Yaya ===
- Iza Calzado as Cecille
- Sheryl Cruz as Grace
- Nash Aguas as Benjo
- TJ Trinidad as Teacher Mel
- Debraliz Valasote as Manang Hermie
- Boom Labrusca as Julio
- Nene Tamayo as Arlyn

=== LRT ===
- Manilyn Reynes as Jean
- Keempee de Leon as Cesar
- Quintin Alianza as Jimmy
- Empress Schuck as Nina
- Dino Imperial as Rocky
- Cass Ponti as Steph
- Charles Christianson as Don
- Sergio Garcia as Anton
- Mhyco Aquino as Martin
- IC Mendoza as Ojie
- Miko Palanca† as Rico
- Ehra Madrigal as Jenny
- Eugene Domingo as Lita
- TJ Trinidad as Teacher Mel (cameo appearance, crossover from "Yaya")
- Boom Labrusca as Monster
- Mario Lipit as Monster's Double

== Accolades ==
Year	Award-Giving Body	Category	Recipient	Result
2006	Metro Manila Film Festival	Third Best Picture	Shake, Rattle and Roll 8	Won
2006	Metro Manila Film Festival	Best Child Performer	Nash Aguas	Won
2006	Metro Manila Film Festival	Best Festival Actress	Iza Calzado	Nominated

== See also ==
- Shake, Rattle & Roll (film series)
- List of ghost films
