= Shake, Rattle and Roll Fourteen: The Invasion =

2012 film by Chito S. Roño

- Theatrical release poster
- Directed by: Chito S. Roño
- Screenplay by: Ricardo Lee (segment "Pamana"); Rody Vera (segment "Lost Command"); Roy C. Iglesias (segment "Unwanted")
- Story by: Chito S. Roño
- Produced by: Lily Y. Monteverde; Roselle Y. Monteverde
- Starring: Vhong Navarro; Janice de Belen; Herbert Bautista; Dennis Trillo; Lovi Poe; Paulo Avelino; Martin Escudero
- Cinematography: Gary Gardoce (segment "Pamana"); Neil Daza (segment "Lost Command"); Mo Zee (segment "Unwanted")
- Edited by: Vanessa Ubas de Leon (segments "Pamana" and "Unwanted"); Carlo Francisco Manatad (segment "Lost Command")
- Music by: Von de Guzman (segment "Pamana"); Jerrold Tarog (segment "Lost Command"); Carmina Cuya (segment "Unwanted")
- Production company: Regal Entertainment
- Release date: December 25, 2012
- Running time: 122 minutes
- Country: Philippines
- Language: Filipino

Shake, Rattle and Roll Fourteen: The Invasion (stylized as The Invasion: Shake Rattle and Roll Fourteen, and also known as Shake, Rattle and Roll XIV or Shake, Rattle and Roll 14) is a 2012 Filipino science fiction horror anthology film directed by Chito S. Roño, and the fourteenth installment of the Shake, Rattle & Roll film series, following the thirteenth film in 2011. The film stars an ensemble cast including Vhong Navarro, Janice de Belen, Herbert Bautista, Dennis Trillo, Lovi Poe, Paulo Avelino, and Martin Escudero. The film was produced by Regal Entertainment, and is an official entry to the 38th Metro Manila Film Festival. The film also features the return of Arlene Muhlach, Janice de Belen and Herbert Bautista, which starred in past installments.

The film consists of three stories: a group of cousins inheriting a fortune must face comic book monsters that come to life; a platoon of soldiers trapped in a forest tries to survive a horde of zombies; and a couple inside a collapsing shopping mall struggles to escape a sudden alien invasion.

The fifteenth installment, Shake, Rattle & Roll XV, was released in 2014.

== Plot ==
=== "Pamana" ===
In 1983, four cousins: emigrant Benedict, narcissistic Myra, eloquent Faye and former clergyman Donald gather in their late uncle's house to get their inheritance of 5 million pesos each. Their uncle's butler told them if one of them dies within a month, his/her inheritance goes to the others. Each of them were given the responsibility of taking care of a comic book written by their uncle. The cousins show no interest to their comic books, except Donald, and throw it away. Meanwhile, Benedict is killed by Filomena, a malakat from one of his uncle's comics.

They return to their uncle's house only to find out the butler had died. At the strike of midnight, the characters in the comics came to life. Donald, with the help from Rosalda, a ghostly pianist, discovers there is an even stronger character, Buboy ang Munting Diablo. Buboy kills them one by one, leaving only Myra and her daughter, Gladys, as the survivors. They rush out of the house and board a taxi. Buboy, disguised as Myra's stepson, Filemon, gives her four cheques worth 5 million pesos each. As they leave, the taxi driver activates his cab's sound system to news broadcasts as nearby residents do the same on their own radios wherein they hear a reporter announcing the imminent arrival of the plane carrying Benigno Aquino, Jr.

=== "Lost Command" ===
Members of the Philippine Army's Special Unit 21 led by 1Lt. Bert Garces and MSgt. Martin Barrientos are sent on a mission to against rebels in the remote jungles of Mindanao perpetrated by a certain Kapitan Baltog, leader of a lost command squad now known as Alsa Puersa.

Following the insurgents' trail, the group goes to Barangay Pototan where Barrientos meets Bunag, a villager who claims "undead soldiers" were "recruiting" his father. An unexpected encounter leaves a third of the platoon missing including Garces as the insurgents abduct them. Barrientos decides to rescue Garces and the others, despite Cpl. Upaon's suggestion to notify base and get back-up. Bunag volunteers to become a guide.

The group encounters a blind girl, Linda, in the forest and offers to lead them to her father, leader of a group fighting what she confirms to be zombies. Upaon voices his doubts, and could neither radio base nor convince Barrientos to go back. Pvt. Conde, meanwhile, supports Barrientos' decision so they push on ahead to a part of the forest that not even Bunag is familiar with.

Linda's father turns out to be a zombie, and has been using his daughter to bring in the unsuspecting new "recruits". An undead Garces shows up, revealing he has retained his intellect and urges the remaining soldiers to join the "new army". Barrientos and his men put up a short-lived stand before they are captured.

Upaon finally manages to radio for back-up before being dragged away by a zombie as Barrientos regains consciousness and meets a zombified vigilante named Col. Rolando Palma, revealing himself to be Kapitan Baltog. He formed the Alsa Puersa, aiming to replace the current army starting with the zombified Special Unit 21. Palma also explains he was zombified somehow due to tainted food provisions. Refusing to accept defeat after being surrounded by the undead, Barrientos manages to rescue Upaon after detonating a nearby cache. However, he is forced to euthanize Upaon who has begun to change after being forced to consume tainted meat.

Meanwhile, Conde narrowly escapes his zombified platoon and finds Barrientos. The two try to escape but get separated along the way. Conde ends up encountering a soldier who can seemingly change into a normal human, and the outcome is left unknown. Barrientos, on the other hand, encounters Linda's father who offers to help him escape in exchange for getting Linda out of the forest. He explains the zombies are somehow unable to cross bodies of water, so he pushes Barrientos into a nearby river before being mauled by the zombified soldiers. Barrientos is found and rescued by an Army helicopter due to Upaon's earlier distress call.

As Barrientos recuperates in a military hospital ward, the nurse informs him that he is not the only survivor of his unit. Garces and Upaon are seen in the beds next to his, revealing that they too can morph. The ending scene shows a zombified soldier attacking a nurse.

=== "Unwanted" ===
On December 21, 2012, Hank and his pregnant girlfriend Kate go to the mall to retrieve a gift for their parents to announce their engagement. Hank leaves Kate outside the gift shop to get their gift. As Hank was about to retrieve the gift, a sudden explosion hits the mall.

Hank soon finds himself trapped in the mall's wreckage along with other survivors: Neil, Tom, and his niece Ming. Hank is worried about Kate being separated and due to the fact that she's pregnant. The four survivors begin to search for other survivors.

After encountering an electric eel-like alien electrocuting anything on its path, they begin to speculate that a group of sea creature-like aliens caused the explosion. Soon after, they encounter a lobster-like alien, which kills Neil.

The trio begin to make their way through the wreckage, and after some time, finds Kate, injured and traumatized by what she saw earlier. Ming then hears many survivors in the corner. When a survivor runs towards them, he tells them an unknown alien is chasing him before fleeing as the alien appears. Tom tries to fight it off, but is killed when it jumps on top of him. The alien's body unsuccessfully chases Hank, Kate, and Ming. They encounter a barber who knows the emergency exits and soon see a teenager crying. When they approach it, they realize he is being used by a lobster alien as bait for luring survivors. The alien kills Ming and the teenager while Hank and Kate flee.

A small lobster alien chases them, but is killed when Rex, a thief who was being hauled away by security guards at the time of the explosion, shoots it with a shotgun. The four see a hooded figure in the dark and discover it to be the leader of the aliens. The aliens' mothership tries to suck everyone into it, starting with the barber. Rex tries to shoot the leader, who only clones into many as the trio flee.

Inside an arcade, they encounter the lobster aliens and the Alpha Lobster alien who is bigger and covered in spikes. Rex stays behind to buy Hank and Kate some time. Rex kills as many as he can but is eventually killed by the Alpha. Hank and Kate make their way outside the mall, only to stumble upon the chaos and destruction brought upon the city of Metro Manila, including SM Mall of Asia, the whole mall complex and the Mall of Asia Arena which has become infested with aliens. The deceased survivors: Neil, Tom, Ming, the barber, and Rex, all turned aliens, appear behind the couple. The transformed aliens tells them that Hank and Kate are the only ones left of their kind, and that they will start a new world, a new generation, infested with aliens.

== Cast ==
=== Pamana ===
- Herbert Bautista as Donald
- Janice de Belen as Myra
- Arlene Muhlach as Faye
- Dennis Padilla as Benjie
- Snooky Serna as Rosalda
- Dimples Romana as Filomena
- Lou Veloso as Katiwala
- Empress Schuck as Cynthia
- Ivan Dorschner as Emerson
- Gerald Pesigan as Filemon
- Eri Neeman as Benedict
- Anna Vicente as Gladys
- Fabio Ide as Konde Nado
- Rain Pogi Quite as Buboy
- Alex Bolado as Tiyanak
- Johnny Barnes as Uncle Lando

=== Lost Command ===
- Dennis Trillo as MSgt. Martin Barrientos PA
- Rommel Padilla as 1st Lt. Bert Garces PA
- Paulo Avelino as Cpl. Lamberto Upaon PA
- Martin Escudero as Pvt. Solomon Conde PA
- Alex Castro as Pvt. Hilario Tabios PA
- JC Tiuseco as Pfc. Maximo Ornedo PA
- AJ Dee as Pfc. Blas Rogado PA
- Ronnie Lazaro as Linda's father
- Roi Vinzon as Kapitan Baltog/Col. Rolando Palma PA
- Makisig Morales as Bunag
- Ella Cruz as Linda
- Benz Sangalang as Pvt. Joaquin Gallego PA
- Chris Pasturan as Zombie Soldier 1
- Lester Llansang as Zombie Soldier 2
- Kenneth Salva as Pfc. Tomas Pugeda PA
- Mon Confiado as Lawan

=== Unwanted ===
- Vhong Navarro as Hank
- Lovi Poe as Kate
- Carlo Aquino as Rex
- Eula Caballero as Ming
- Chokoleit† as Barber
- Eric Tai as Tom
- Albie Casiño as Neil
- Jairus Aquino as Teenager
- Lollie Mara† as Hank's mother
- Ariel Ureta as Hank's father
- Mailes Kanapi as Nurse
- Liesl Batucan as Saleslady
- Veronica Columna as Woman

== Reception ==
The film is rated GP for all ages. The film is Graded A by The Cinema Evaluation Board, but was rated SPG by MTRCB for the 'Horror' theme.

== Accolades ==
| Year | Award-Giving Body | Category | Recipient | Result |
|---|---|---|---|---|
| 2012 | Metro Manila Film Festival | Best Visual Effects | Imaginary Friends Studios and Blackburst Inc. | Won |

== See also ==
- Shake, Rattle & Roll (film series)
- List of ghost films
