= Peque Gallaga =

Filipino filmmaker (1943–2020)

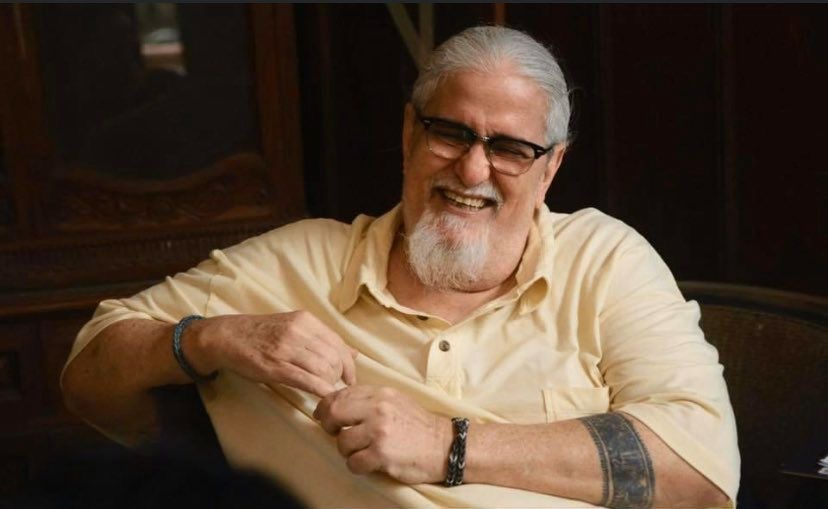
- Gallaga in 2014
- Born: Maurice Gallaga y Ruíz de Luzuriaga; August 25, 1943; Bacolod, Negros Occidental, Second Philippine Republic
- Died: May 7, 2020 (aged 76); Bacolod, Negros Occidental, Philippines
- Other name: Peque Gallaga
- Citizenship: Spain, Philippines
- Occupation: Film director
- Spouse: Madie Gallaga (m. 1968)
- Children: 5

Maurice "Peque" Gallaga (August 25, 1943 – May 7, 2020) was a Filipino filmmaker. His most significant achievement in film was Oro, Plata, Mata (1982), which he directed after winning a scriptwriting contest sponsored by the Experimental Cinema of the Philippines. He has received an award from the International Film Festival of Flanders-Ghent, Belgium in 1983; a Special Jury Award from the Manila International Film Festival; and the 2004 Gawad CCP para sa Sining.

== Education ==
Gallaga spent his elementary and high school years at De La Salle University in City of Manila, then finished his bachelor's in commerce and liberal arts at the University of St. La Salle in Bacolod City, Negros Occidental Province, Visayas. He taught theater and film at the University of St. La Salle.

== Career ==
=== Rise to prominence ===
Upon moving back to Manila, he got involved in television musicals and eventually co-directed the film Binhi with Butch Perez. He also directed the movies Virgin Forest, Scorpio Nights, Unfaithful Wife, and the "Manananggal" segment of Shake, Rattle & Roll.

In 1986 he started co-directing films with Lore Reyes, with whom he shared directing credits for Shake, Rattle & Roll II, Shake, Rattle & Roll III, Shake, Rattle & Roll IV, Baby Love, and more than twenty other films. In the animated movie Dayo, Gallaga voiced the character of "Lolo Nano," the resident sage of Elementalia.

Gallaga and Laida Lim-Pérez won Best Production Design for Eddie Romero's Ganito Kami Noon, Paano Kayo Ngayon? in the first 1976 of Gawad Urian awards.

In 1980, he won the same award for Ishmael Bernal's City After Dark.

During the 1980s, Gallaga served as member of the Film Academy Classification Board (FACB).

In 1989, Gallaga was forced to shelve the film Huwad Na Heredera during production when its lead actress Lorna Tolentino became pregnant; it was later repurposed into a segment for the anthology film True Confessions in 1992, where it was retitled "Evelyn".

Gallaga and Reyes won Best Director and Best Screenplay for Magic Temple in the 1996 Metro Manila Film Festival.

=== Later career ===
In 2009, Agaton & Mindy, directed by Gallaga, was released in theaters.

In 2013, saw the release of several of Gallaga's directorial efforts. On his own these include the film Sonata, and the documentary Botong Francisco: A Nation Imagined. With Reyes they directed Seduction. Also that year, Gallaga was interviewed in the documentary The Search for Weng Weng.

In 2014, Gallaga and Reyes collaborated on their final motion picture T'yanak.

== Personal life ==
Gallaga lived with his wife Madie in Bacolod. They were married for 52 years since January 14, 1968. They have five children: Gines, Michelle, Datu, Jubal and Wanggo.

== Death ==
Gallaga was hospitalized in Bacolod City on May 5, 2020, due to complications from his past health conditions. Two days later on May 7, Gallaga died in hospital from cardio-pulmonary arrest.

He was cremated in accordance to his and that of his family's wishes.

== Partial filmography ==
=== Director ===
- Binhi (1973)
- Oro, Plata, Mata (1982)
- Bad Bananas sa Puting Tabing (1983)
- Shake, Rattle & Roll ("Manananggal" segment; 1984)
- Scorpio Nights (1985)
- Virgin Forest (1985)
- Unfaithful Wife (1986)
- Once Upon a Time (with Lorenzo A. Reyes, 1987)
- Kid, Huwag Kang Susuko (with Lorenzo A. Reyes, 1987)
- Hiwaga sa Balete Drive (with Lorenzo A. Reyes, 1988)
- Tiyanak (with Lorenzo A. Reyes, 1988)
- Isang Araw Walang Diyos (with Lorenzo A. Reyes, 1989)
- Abandonada (with Lorenzo A. Reyes, 1989)
- Trese (1990)
- Shake, Rattle & Roll II (with Lore Reyes, 1990)
- Adventures of Gary Leon at Kuting (1991)
- Shake, Rattle & Roll III (1991)
- True Confessions ("Evelyn" segment; 1992)
- Aswang (1992)
- Shake, Rattle & Roll IV ("Ang Guro" segment; 1992)
- Dugo ng Panday (1993)
- Milagro (television film; 1993)
- Mars Ravelo's Darna! Ang Pagbabalik (1994)
- Batang X (1995)
- Baby Love (1995)
- Magic Temple (1996)
- Magic Kingdom (Alamat ng Damortis) (1997)
- Halik ng Bampira (1997)
- Diliryo (1997)
- Gangland (1998)
- Puso ng Pasko (1998)
- Ang Kabit ni Mrs. Montero (1999)
- Unfaithful Wife 2: Sana'y Huwag Akong Maligaw (1999)
- Sa Piling ng Aswang (with Lore Reyes, 1999)
- Pinoy Blonde (2005)
- Agaton & Mindy (2009)
- Seduction (2013)
- Sonata (with Lore Reyes, 2013)
- T'yanak (with Lore Reyes, 2014)

=== Screenwriter ===
- Once Upon a Time (1986)
- Hiwaga sa Balete Drive (1988)
- Tiyanak (with Lorenzo Reyes, 1988)
- Isang Araw Walang Diyos (1989) (story and screenplay)
- Shake, Rattle & Roll II (1990)
- Aswang (1992)
- Shake, Rattle & Roll IV (1992)
- Dugo ng Panday (1993)
- Baby Love (1995) (story and screenplay)
- Magic Temple (1996) (screenplay)
- Magic Kingdom (Alamat ng damortis) (1997)
- Scorpio Nights 2 (1999) (story)
- Ang Agimat, anting-anting ni Lolo (2002) (screenplay)
- Pinoy Blonde (2005)

=== Actor ===
- Tatlong Taong Walang Diyos (1976) - Francis
- Ganito Kami Noon... Paano Kayo Ngayon? (1976) - Spanish Officer
- Gumising Ka... Maruja (1978) - Attorney
- Oro, Plata, Mata (1982) - Pascual
- Misteryo Sa Tuwa (1984) - Mr. Murphy
- Virgin Forest (1985) - Kamaggay
- Scorpio Nights (1985) - Fely's Father
- Unfaithful Wife (1986)
- Lucio & Miguel (1992) – San Pedro
- Dugo ng Panday (1993) - Scientist
- Magic Kingdom: Ang Alamat ng Damortis (1997) - Innkeeper
- José Rizal (1998) – Archbishop Bernardo Nozaleda, OP
- Tigasin (1999) - Mr. Pablo
- The Cory Quirino Kidnap: NBI Files (2003)
- Shit Happens (2005) - The Professor
- Enteng Kabisote 4 (2007) – Time Lord
- Dayo (2008) – Lolo Nano
- Namets! (2008) – Boss Dolpo
- Hubad (2008) - Andre Joaquin
- Si Agimat at si Enteng Kabisote (2010) – Ermitanyo
- Pak! Pak! My Dr. Kwak! (2011) – San Pedro
- Six Degrees of Separation from Lilia Cuntapay (2011) - Special Appearance
- Huling Biyahe (2012) - Butch Barrameda
- Islands (2013)
- Woman of the Ruins (2013) - Sol
- Relaks, It's Just Pag-ibig (2014)

== Awards ==
Year	Award-Giving Body	Category	Work	Result
1996	Metro Manila Film Festival	Best Director (with Lore Reyes)	Magic Temple	Won
1996	Metro Manila Film Festival	Best Original Story (with Lore Reyes and Erik Matti)	Magic Temple	Won
1996	Metro Manila Film Festival	Best Screenplay (with Lore Reyes and Erik Matti)	Magic Temple	Won
