= Frank G. Rivera =

Filipino writer

- Born: 28 February 1948 (age 78); Paete, Laguna, Philippines
- Occupations: Playwright, actor, production designer
- Years active: 1982–2001

Frank G. Rivera (born 29 February 1948) is a Filipino retired-playwright, actor and production designer.

== Biography ==
Rivera was born on 29 February 1948 in Paete, Laguna. He received his AB English-Filipino degree from the University of the Philippines. He led the movement for the theater when he established the Sining Kambayoka, a folk theater company on the campus of Mindanao State University in the 1970s.

He has won several awards, including the 8th Annual Gawad Ustetika Awards in the Play category, 1997 Patnubay ng Sining at Kalinangan para sa Tanghalan from the City of Manila and the 2002 National Book Award from the Manila Critics' Circle for his book, Mga Dula sa Magkakaibang Midyum.

He started out in Severino Montano's Arena Theatre Guild and Cecile Guidote's PETA. He represented the Philippines in numerous International Theater Festivals and Conferences in the US, Korea, Thailand, Mexico, Singapore and Australia.

Rivera is afflicted with lymphoma, a type of blood cancer which, in his case, developed on his bone marrow along his dental structure.

== Works ==
1. Tuhog-tuhog (2005)
2. Jose Rizal: iba’t ibang Pananaw (2005)
3. Halik sa Kampilan (2005)
4. Makata sa Cellphone (2005)
5. TAO: Isang Tagulaylay Sa Ikadalawampu’t Isang Siglo (2004)
6. Oyayi, Ang Zarzuela (2004)
7. Darna, Etc. (2003)
8. Sining Kambayoka's Mga Kuwentong Maranao (2003)
9. Ambon, Ulan, Baha: Sarsuwelang Pinoy (2003)
10. Gothic Telemovies (2002)
11. MULAT: Mga Isyung Panlipunan sa mga Dulang Pantelebisyon (2002)
12. Mga Dula sa Magkakaibang Midyum (1982)
13. Ama at iba pa, Sari-saring Dula (1982)

== Awards ==
- 2006 Gawad Alab ng Haraya for Published Works in 2005: The Makata sa Cellphone Trilogy
- 2005 Gawad Balagtas/Gawad ng Pagkilala
- 2005 National Book Award for the Makata sa Cellphone Trilogy
- 2005 Aliw Awards for Best Musical Play for Oyayi
- 2004 National Book Award for Drama for Oyayi
- 2004 Aliw Awards for Best Musical Play, Ambon, Ulan, Baha
- 2003 Global Filipino Literary Award for Drama for Mulat: Mga Isyung Panlipunan sa Mga Dulang Pantelebisyon
- 2002 Palanca Memorial Awards for Literature for the full-length play in English, The Adventures of Pilandok
- 1997 Gawad CCP for Regional Theater for the MSU-Sining Kambayoka
- 1986 Metro Manila Film Festival for Best Actress from the Halimaw sa Banga
- 1980 Balagtas Award for Theater for the MSU Sining Kambayoka from the Surian ng Wikang Pambansa
- 1978 ALIW Award for Best Theater Director, MSU Sining Kambayoka
- 1974 Palanca Memorial Award for Literature for Ama
