= Maalaala Mo Kaya season 31 =

Filipino television series

Maalaala Mo Kaya
- Season 31
- Starring: Charo Santos
- No. of episodes: 13

Release
- Original network: iWantTFC iWant
- Original release: April 24 – July 23, 2025

Season chronology
- ← Previous; Season 30

Maalaala Mo Kaya (transl. Would you remember?; abbreviated MMK), also known as Memories in English, is a Philippine anthology series, which was first aired on May 15, 1991. MMK is the longest-running drama anthology on Philippine television. The 31st season is a limited series that was released on iWantTFC (now iWant) from April 24 to July 23, 2025, with a director's cut version and aired on Kapamilya Channel, A2Z and All TV from April 26 to July 26. The series consists of 13 episodes.

== Episodes ==
| No. | Title | Directed by | Written by | Original air date (Note: Starting episode 4, the release date will be on Wednesday instead of Thursday.) |
|---|---|---|---|---|
| 1 | "Apoy" "Fire" | Theodore Boborol | Chie Floresca | April 24, 2025 |
The life story of singer Sofronio Vasquez. Sofronio's dream of becoming a singer takes a back seat when he reluctantly follows his father's wish. His passion and confidence suffer a major hit after countless losses, but it seems fate has other plans for him as another opportunity comes in. Cast: Elijah Canlas, Romnick Sarmenta, Janice de Belen, Yves Flores, Lui Manansala, Dustine Mayores, Sean Tristan
| 2 | "Camera" | Froy Allan Leonardo | Joan Habana | May 1, 2025 |
The life story of Bini member Sheena. Sheena shares a strong bond with her mother Angelyn and together, they envision a future where she will become a performer. However, a tragedy strikes just when their goal is within reach, leaving Sheena full of doubts about their once-shared dream. Cast: Sheena Catacutan, Angelica Panganiban, Malou de Guzman, Bembol Roco, Aljon Mendoza, Janell Gonzaga, Tart Carlos
| 3 | "Bahay" "Home (part 1)" | Onat Diaz | Benson Logronio | May 8, 2025 |
An account of the 2021 murder of siblings Gwynn and Boyboy Maguad by their adopted sister, Janice, in Cotabato. Cruz and Lovella Maguad reluctantly give in to their children's request and adopt Janice, treating her like their own. As time passes, the couple grows increasingly suspicious of her until a tragedy befalls their family. Cast: Dimples Romana, Joem Bascon, Karina Bautista, Criza Taa, Miguel Vergara, Anna Luna, Heidi Arima
| 4 | "Envelope (part 2)" | Onat Diaz | Benson Longronio | May 21, 2025 |
The Maguad couple's world comes crashing down after the brutal killings of their children. To make matters worse, Jasmine (Janice) is revealed to have a hand in the crime. Amid their pursuit of justice, Cruz and Lovella are forced to face the harrowing truth. Cast: Dimples Romana, Joem Bascon, Karina Bautista, Criza Taa, Miguel Vergara, Anna Luna, Tanya Gomez, Rafa Siguion-Reyna, Rans Rifol, Bon Andrew Lentejas, Malou Canzana, Adriana Agcaoili, Mimi Orara
| 5 | "Gumamela" "Hibiscus" | Paco. Sta Maria | Raymund T. Barcelon | May 28, 2025 |
After a miscarriage, Marissa loses another shot at motherhood when her husband sends her stepdaughter, Angel, away to live with his parents. Years later, Angel returns distant and rebellious, falling into a nightmare no mother could bear to imagine. Cast: Iza Calzado, Krystal Mejes, James Blanco, Zia Grace, Kakki Teodoro, Benedix Ramos, Lance Lucido
| 6 | "SIM Card (part 1)" | Raz de la Torre | Akeem Datol del Rosario | June 4, 2025 |
Nadia is left with no choice but to start over and take a high-paying job offer in Thailand after losing her hard-earned money to a crypto scam, only to be deceived and trafficked into a cyber scam operation in Myanmar. Cast: Bela Padilla, Kean Cipriano, Mickey Ferriols, Viveika Ravanes, Apey Obera, David Chua
| 7 | "Bintana" "Window (part 2)" | Raz de la Torre | Akeem Datol del Rosario | June 11, 2025 |
Nadia's refusal to continue working as a scammer turns her life into a living hell. Amid suffering unimaginable horror day after day, she desperately clings to a tinge of hope of seeing the children that she left behind. Cast: Bela Padilla, Mickey Ferriols, David Chua, Gimbey dela Cruz, Claire Ruiz, Nicco Manalo, Tarek Tayech, Jordan Hong
| 8 | "Makeup" | Onat Diaz | Joan Habana | June 18, 2025 |
The life story of content creators and couple Hajie Alejandro and Lenie Aycardo. Growing up in poverty, life is all about survival for Hajie until Lenie comes along. Despite rumors about Hajie's gender identity, the two become a couple and work together as a glam team, only for their personal struggles to test their relationship. Cast: Kyle Echarri, Kai Montinola, Lotlot de Leon, Arlene Muhlach, Simon Ibarra, Bimbo Cerrudo, Matt Evans, Igi Boy Flores
| 9 | "Lobo" "Balloon" | Dado Lumibao | Akeem Datol del Rosario | June 25, 2025 |
As if her sufferings at the hands of her mother and stepfather are not enough, Marlyn's life spirals further into misery when she becomes a victim of sex trafficking. But despite having a fresh start, her old wounds come back to haunt her. Cast: Mutya Orquia, Ara Mina, Ruby Ruiz, Desiree del Valle, Gerald Madrid, Rubi Rubi
| 10 | "Medal" | Kevin Alambra | Chie Floresa | July 2, 2025 |
The life story of the 2025 Palarong Pambansa Gold Medalist in 200-meter dash, Trixia Arellano. Trixia joins her school's sprint team, hoping to clinch a medal someday. Her career takes off to a great start even without properly fitting running shoes. And just within nine months, she joins a national event where she meets her biggest obstacle. Cast: Andi Abaya, Meryll Soriano, Ryza Cenon, Ketchup Eusebio, Bubbles Paraiso, Daisy Cariño, Janiel Bacud
| 11 | "Trumpo" | Raymund Ocampo | Akeem Datol del Rosario | July 9, 2025 |
The life story of Pilipinas Got Talent Season 7 Grand Winner, Cardong Trumpo. Ricky once found comfort in a spinning top. Now a parent himself, he vows to never be like his own father. But as pressure builds, he begins to doubt himself until one day, he picks up his spinning top again—not to play, but to survive. Cast: JM de Guzman, Jennica Garcia, Alan Paule, Ana Abad Santos
| 12 | "Pinto" "Door" | Onat Diaz | Benson Logronio | July 16, 2025 |
The life story of Eugene Dela Cruz, a homeless person who subsequently graduated with honors from the Ateneo de Manila University. Everything changes for the worse for Eugene when his mother abandons him and when he comes out as gay. Shunned by his family, he is forced to fend for himself on the streets and face unimaginable odds to become a top student at a leading university. Cast: Tommy Alejandrino, Smokey Manaloto, Jeffrey Santos, Andrea del Rosario, Franco Laurel, Carla Martinez, Adriana Agcaoili, Binsoy Namoca, Bong Gonzales, Ces Quesada
| 13 | "Habal-habal" "Motorcycle Taxi" | Raz de la Torre | Akeem Datol del Rosario | July 23, 2025 |
The life story of Venerando "Andot" Ebarita Jr., a habal-habal driver who became a senior officer of the Bureau of Jail Management and Penology. Andot's desire for independence and control over his own life pushes him to tread a dangerous path. But just when he gets the freedom he yearns for, a tragedy ultimately changes his life. Cast: Zaijian Jaranilla, Rosanna Roces, Dominic Ochoa
