= Maalaala Mo Kaya season 30 =

Maalaala Mo Kaya
- Season 30
- Title card
- Starring: Charo Santos
- No. of episodes: 22 (as of December 10, 2022) excluding re-runs

Release
- Original network: Kapamilya Channel; A2Z; (replacing ABS-CBN, ad interim)
- Original release: January 1 – December 10, 2022

Season chronology
- ← Previous; Season 29 Next → Season 31

Maalaala Mo Kaya (transl. Would you remember?; abbreviated MMK), also known as Memories in English, is a Philippine anthology series, which was first aired on May 15, 1991. MMK is the longest-running drama anthology on Philippine television. However due to franchise renewal controversy over the network giant ABS-CBN, it shown limitedly on Kapamilya Channel and A2Z Channel 11, This is the 30th and final season that will produce after the announcement by the host which announced on November 19, 2022.

== Episodes ==
#	Episode title	Directed by	Written by	Original air date	Ratings
1	"Silver Medal"	Ian Loreños	Michael Bryan Transfiguracion and Arah Jell G. Badayos	January 8, 2022	N/A
The untold story of 2020 Summer Olympics silver medalist Carlo Paalam has a life being with sports for boxing than his strive of career, however prejudice has fall into his flame for his favor but how long will take a while if he goes to lost for someone for passion? Cast: CJ Navato, William Lorenzo, Mon Confiado, Aurora Sevilla, Rochelle Barrameda, Miggy Campbell, Raymond Mabute, Missy Quiño, Yen Quirante, Rex Lantano, Ali Abinal, Rhett Romero
2	"Slot Machine"	Raymund Ocampo	Joan Habana	January 22, 2022	N/A
The addictice princess just for longing for happy ending, this is how Baby shows to share her thoughts about her passionate living with her true story about her hidden relationship with David and also she had an outstanding unpaid debts to her neighbour but her way was to play in the Casino topay at her imposter, while her older children was in overseas she was in a nervous breakdown on how to deal to disclose, will Baby make apologies for her bad actions to her family? Cast: Lara Quigaman, Mon Confiado, Angelica Lao, Jef Gaitan, Jacqui Leus, Luciana Andres, Miggy Campbell, Elaine Plopenio
3	"Simbahan" "Church"	Jerome Pobocan	Joan Habana	February 12, 2022	1.12%
After constant searching for "the right one" on Facebook, John got to meet Angel who would eventually become his girlfriend. Their growing romance will be tested when Angel was diagnosed with breast cancer. How will the young couple managed to keep themselves together, fight for their love, and build a life of their own? Cast: Jane Oineza, Kit Thompson, Rochelle Barrameda, Rhett Romero, Gian Wang, Ali Abinal, Reign Parani, Elaine Plopenio
4	"Caramel Sundae"	Raz de la Torre	Akeem Jordan Del Rosario	February 26, 2022	1.12%
Tess is born to a poverty-stricken family and usually supports her mother, who is suffering from postpartum depression. While studying, she works as a crew member in a fast-food chain where he meets John, who unlike her is born wealthy but opposite attract by their means of love, along with their deep experience about life and crossfading, their intention to strike out anything else but nobody, however it some difficult talents, Tess had applied to an appliance store as a finance officer while John upholds as an engineer, soon as long they not been going to pursue sweet surrender or what they can any distance for love as shattering apart? Cast: Karina Bautista, Aljon Mendoza, Gilleth Sandico, Mike Lauren, Tess Antonio, Joel Molina, Meghan Danielle
5	"Selda" "Jail Cell"	Raz de la Torre	Arah Jell G. Badayos	March 12, 2022	2.7%
Karen Bordador has just started to gain a reputation for herself as a highly-regarded and popular radio DJ, and as an up-and-coming fashion model and television personality. However, success starts to swerve at the wrong direction as Karen would be arrested for illegal drugs after visiting her then boyfriend. This not only jeopardized her well-established career, but so as her mother Norie as she has to bear all the negative news and comments about Karen in private. How will she maintain a positive outlook if she will have to endure her time in prison longer than what she expects? How will she adjust to her new found life behind bars? Cast: Kaila Estrada, Shamaine Buencamino, Lou Yanong, Karla Pambid, Teetin Villanueva, Karen Bordador
6	"Tablet"	Raz de la Torre	Arah Jell G. Badayos	March 19, 2022	2.3%
The story of Karen Bordador continues as she got to adjust to life in prison while keeping a positive outlook. With many legal hurdles and the coronavirus pandemic situation both affecting the judicial process and life in jail itself, Karen starts to lose hope as delays to her case keep on occurring. With the final promulgation being done on a tablet from jail, will she ever get a second take on her chance to rebuild her life and fulfill her dreams outside? Cast: Kaila Estrada, Shamaine Buencamino, Lou Yanong, Karla Pambid, Teetin Villanueva, Karen Bordador, Marlina Carlos
7	"Altar"	Raz de la Torre	Joan Habana	April 2, 2022	2.8%
Michael, Angelo, and Anthony Villadarez are three brothers who become orphans as they lose both of their parents during their childhood. Their grandmother Deling decides to be her grandchildren’s guardian despite her estranged relationship with them before due to their parents’ lack of wealth. Over the years, the brothers grow even closer to their grandmother to the point where they make it their end goal for all of them to be together with better lives abroad. However, as they each leave their grandmother behind one by one to study and work towards their dreams in Canada, their patience continues to be tested through the prolonged wait for immigration to approve Deling’s documents. Can the Villadarez brothers all return to the Philippines to take care of their grandmother when she falls ill, or do they remain overseas in hopes that they will bring her to their new home? Cast: James Graham, JB Agustin, Luke Alford, Marlo Mortel, Sky Quizon, Gilleth Sandico, Hero Angeles, Peewee O'Hara
8	"Singsing" "Ring"	Froy Allan Leonardo	Mae Rose Balanay and Arah Jell G. Badayos	April 23, 2022	1.15%
Cast: Charlie Dizon, Kiko Estrada, Maila Gumila, Maritess Samson, Teetin Villanueva, Marlina Carlos
9	"Kakanin" "Rice"	Raz de la Torre	Arah Jell G. Badayos	May 7, 2022	1.15%
Cast: Dawn Chang, Susan Africa, Mary Joy Apostol, Pamu Pamorada, Iñigo Delen
10	"Ring Light"	Raz de la Torre	Arah Jell G. Badayos	May 14, 2022	2.3%
Daisy continues to work hard, this time abroad, working as a performer until she returned back home. Even back home, she communicates with her foreigner boyfriend, would eventually meet up in person and introduce him to her family, and would bear a daughter with him. Suddenly, Daisy's mother was stricken by a stroke for the third time. This forced Daisy to give up her savings just to take care of her now bed-ridden mother. Her relationship with her boyfriend would be strained due to lockdowns, and led to them separating after learning she was being cheated. Despite these, she continued to use her "Madam Inutz" persona in her live selling sessions online, and continued to tend to her mother's care. This led to her receiving support from her "miners," the overflow of online projects, and eventually land as a celebrity housemate while keeping her promise for her family. Cast: Dawn Chang, Susan Africa, Mary Joy Apostol, Pamu Pamorada, Iñigo Delen
11	"Logbook"	Raz de la Torre	Akeem Jordan Del Rosario	June 11, 2022	1.10%
Cast: JM de Guzman, Anna Luna, Soliman Cruz, Joel Saracho, Giovanni Baldisseri, Mike Liwag, Mark Malana, David Minemoto
12	"Selda" "Jail Cell"	Raz de la Torre	Akeem Jordan Del Rosario	June 18, 2022	1.13%
Cast: JM de Guzman, Anna Luna, Soliman Cruz, Joel Saracho, Giovanni Baldisseri, Mike Liwag, Mark Malana
13	"Pulseras" "Bracelet"	Nuel Naval	Alpha Fortun	July 23, 2022	2.13%
Cast: Elisse Joson, Irma Adlawan, Aurora Yumul, Ced Torrecarion, Bea Borres
14	"Cake"	Raymund Ocampo	Mary Rose Colindres	August 6, 2022	2.7%
Cast: Heaven Peralejo, Markus Paterson, Karla Pambid, Bimbo Cerrudo, Benedix Ramos
15	"Bisikleta" "Bicycle"	Nuel Naval	Chie Floresca	August 20, 2022	2.11%
Cast: Nonie Buencamino, Paolo Gumabao, Carla Guevara, CX Navarro, Genesis Redido, Mike Liwag, David Minemoto
16	"Passport"	Raz de la Torre	Chie Floresca	September 10, 2022	1.16%
Cast: Lotlot de Leon, Louise Abuel, Tanya Gomez, Aya Fernandez, Jet Alcantara, Ivan Carapiet, Alfonso Yñigo Delen, Yen Quirante
17	"Engagement Ring"	Kevin Alambra	Joan Habana	October 1, 2022	1.15%
Cast: Andrea Brillantes, Jameson Blake, Sharmaine Suarez, Criza Taa, Batit Espiritu
18	"Lumpiang Shanghai" "Shanghai Rolls"	Raz de la Torre	Alpha Fortun	October 8, 2022	3.2%
Joan's life makes an unexpected turn following the deaths of her parents, leaving her with the responsibility of taking care of her sister Jai. However, her strength is put to the test when Jai gets diagnosed with schizophrenia. Cast: Charlie Dizon, Bea Clark, JC Alcantara, Lito Pimentel, Hasna Cabral, Mika Pajares, Yen Quirante, Tiff Ronato
19	"Medalyon" "Medallion"	Froy Allan Leonardo	Jerry Gracio	November 19, 2022	N/A
For years, Billy has been trying to ignore his paranormal ability for fear of being ostracized. Just as he meets someone who truly accepts him, Billy faces the greatest fight of his life. Cast: RK Bagatsing, Malou de Guzman, Ryza Cenon, Alfonso Yñigo Delen, Rolando Inocencio, Arnold Reyes, Jonic Magno, Maika Rivera, Ingrid dela Paz
20	"Family Picture"	Dado Lumibao	Akeem Jordan Del Rosario	November 26, 2022	N/A
Abby (Kaila Estrada) travels to Cyprus along with her sister-in-law Ronalyn (Jacqui Leus) to pursue work as a cultural dancer and waitress respectively. Unfortunately upon arrival, the club owner (Leo Rialp) tricks them into prostitution. Abby eventually becomes hooked on cocaine in order to tolerate the abuse. Despite this, she decides to hide the horrors of her job from her family whom she is determined to support. Later on, more Pinay recruits join the night club, also under the false pretense of being dancers: Iris (Karina Bautista), Glenda (Meg Imperial), Trina (Jenny Miller), and Janna (Trina Legaspi). Will Abby and the rest of the girls be able to escape and save their lives? Cast: Kaila Estrada, Ana Abad Santos, Leo Rialp, Karina Bautista, Meg Imperial, Trina Legaspi, Jenny Miller, Jacqui Leus, Apey Obera, Jonic Magno, Akihiro Blanco
21	"Bote" "Bottle"	Dado Lumibao	Akeem Jordan Del Rosario	December 3, 2022	3.4%
Abby, with the support of Iris, Glenda, Trina, and Janna, quits her dependency on drugs for survival. However the hardships of Abby and her newfound friends continue as they suffer the consequences of breaking the bar’s rules such as insubordination towards their customers, as well as going out of the premises after hours. The women remain strong for their families, while becoming hopeful that they will find their way back home as a whistleblower reported the club’s activities of illegal sex work to the local authorities. Meanwhile, Abby herself is hurt further as she is informed of her husband Mark’s (Akihiro Blanco) affair, and her being a popular girl at the bar prevents her from returning to the Philippines. Cast: Kaila Estrada, Ana Abad Santos, Leo Rialp, Karina Bautista, Meg Imperial, Trina Legaspi, Jenny Miller, Jacqui Leus, Apey Obera, Jonic Magno, Akihiro Blanco, Jomari Angeles
22	"Passport"	Dado Lumibao	Akeem Jordan Del Rosario	December 10, 2022	3.4%
Following the departures of Ronalyn and Janna from the bar, Abby, Iris, Glenda, and Trina also finally come back home to the Philippines. The challenge now is to move on from their trauma and face their respective families in order to continue with their lives. For Abby, it first meant leaving Mark after confronting him for his infidelity while she was abroad, taking their children with her. While the rest of the women were able to forget and heal in their own ways, Abby continues to be triggered from her experiences in Cyprus, affecting her relationship with her loved ones and even a new suitor James (Race Matias). Once again with the support of the girls as well as James, Abby eventually musters up the strength to tell the rest of her family so she can truly be free and start over. Cast: Kaila Estrada, Ana Abad Santos, Leo Rialp, Karina Bautista, Meg Imperial, Trina Legaspi, Jenny Miller, Jacqui Leus, Apey Obera, Jonic Magno, Akihiro Blanco, Race Matias, Jomari Angeles
