= Randy Dellosa =

Filipino psychologist

Randy Misael Sebastian Dellosa, known as Doc Randy is a Filipino psychologist and who has training in psychiatry.

He is life coach-psychotherapist of Filipino celebrities and was the resident psychologist in the Pinoy Big Brother, The Biggest Loser Pinoy Edition, Pinoy Dream Academy, Pinoy Fear Factor, and I Do (Philippine reality show) reality TV shows of ABS-CBN Network as well as game shows such as Deal or No Deal. He is also a frequent resource person on psychological topics in the news programs and documentary shows of GMA Network, TV5 (Philippines), and other networks.

He is the first and so far the only Filipino who has training in psychiatry (M.D.), a doctor of clinical psychology (Psy.D.), and an osteopath (DO-MTP)

== Education ==
Dellosa studied in Philippine educational and training institutions:

- La Salle Green Hills for his elementary education;
- Ateneo de Manila University for his high school education;
- University of the Philippines for his college education in Psychology;
- Far Eastern University - Institute of Medicine for his medical studies; and
- Makati Medical Center and Veterans Memorial Medical Center for his psychiatry residency training.
- Osteopathic College of Ontario for his education in osteopathy.

He received training in Gestalt Psychotherapy and in healing arts in Europe (Germany, France, Spain, Switzerland) and in Asia (India, Indonesia) under the Gestalt Education Network International.

He was awarded his Doctor of Psychology Degree (Psy.D.) from the University of Southern California where he was awarded scholarship, aside from graduating with academic honors (cum laude).

== Academic career ==
Dellosa has taught at the University of the Philippines, De La Salle University, and the Asian Theological Seminary. In these schools, he trained and supervised counselors, psychologists, and psychiatrists in the art of counseling and psychotherapy.

== Media exposure ==
Popularly known as a celebrity shrink, Dellosa was a consultant for reality television shows, a resource person for talk shows, and a life coach-psychotherapist of celebrities in such fields as entertainment, politics, religion, arts, and sports.

Randy has featured in Philippine periodicals such as Woman's Journal, Men's Zone Magazine, Kerygma Magazine, Today, Philippine Star, Manila Bulletin, Smart Parenting, Manila Times, Medical Observer, Health and Family, and Health Today.

== Clinical practice ==
- Randy established the Life Change Recovery Center, a treatment facility for drug dependents and psychiatric patients.
- He co-founded and is Charter President of the Philippine Association of Christian Counselors.
- He established the Philippine Society of Life Coaches.
- He established the Gestalt Therapy Association of the PHilippines.
- He established the Philippine Association of Integrative Medicine and Holistic Therapies.
