= 2025 Santiago, Isabela, local elections =

Local elections in Santiago, Philippines

2025 Santiago, Isabela local elections
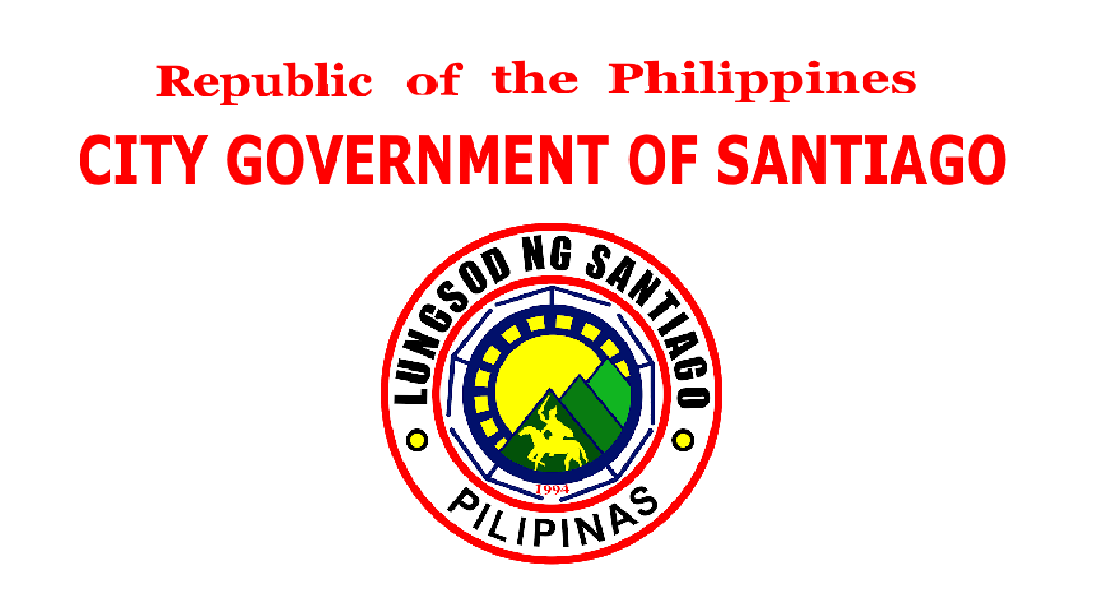
- May 12, 2025
- Mayoral election
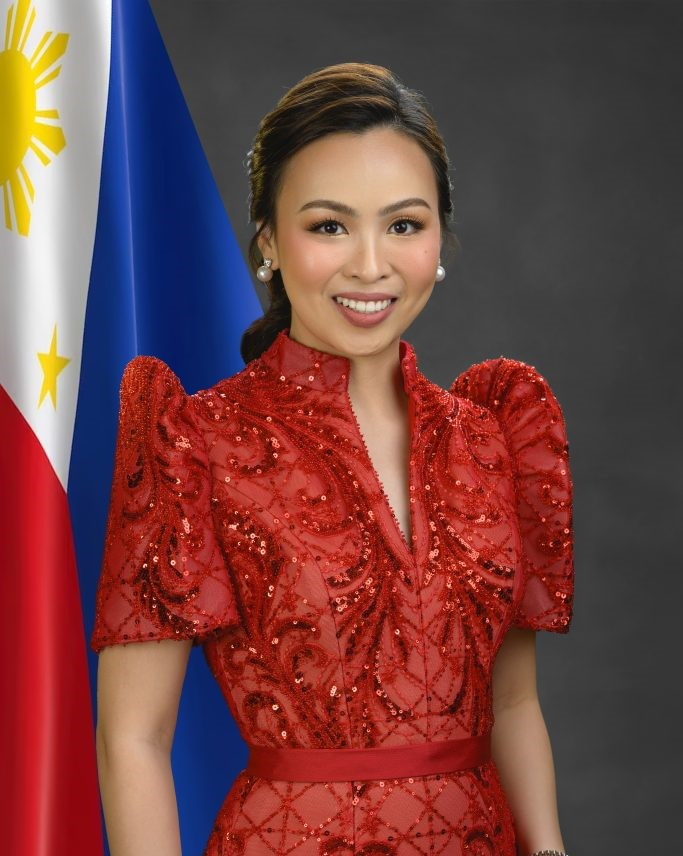
		Aksyon	NPC
Candidate	Alyssa Sheena Tan	Otep Miranda	Arlene Alvarez-Reyes
Party	Lakas–CMD	Aksyon	NPC
Running mate	Jamayne Tan	Jigs Miranda	Maximin Navarro
Popular vote	68,743	19,208	7,690
Percentage	71.88%	20.08%	8.04%
Mayor before election
Alyssa Sheena Tan
Lakas
Elected mayor
Alyssa Sheena Tan
Lakas
- Vice mayoral election
	Lakas		NPC
Candidate	Jamayne Tan	Jigs Miranda	Maximin Navarro
Party	Lakas–CMD	Aksyon	NPC
Popular vote	48,292	26,618	14,601
Percentage	53.56%	29.52%	16.19%
	Aksyon
Vice Mayor before election
Alvin Abaya
PDP
Elected Vice Mayor
Jamayne Tan
Lakas
- City Council election
- 10 out of 13 seats in the Santiago City Council; 7 seats needed for a majority
Party	Current seats
Lakas	9
Aksyon	1

Local elections were held in Santiago, Isabela on May 12, 2025, as part of the 2025 Philippine general election. Santiago voters elected a mayor, a vice mayor, and 10 out of 13 councilors of the Santiago City Council.

== Mayor ==
Incumbent Alyssa Sheena Tan (Lakas–CMD) is running for a second term. Tan was elected under PDP–Laban with 48.97% of the vote in 2022.

=== Candidates ===
The following candidates are included in the ballot:

No.	Candidate	Party
1	Arlene Alvarez-Reyes	Nationalist People's Coalition
2	Otep Miranda	Aksyon Demokratiko
3	Alyssa Sheena Tan (incumbent)	Lakas–CMD

=== Results ===
Candidate	Party	Votes	%
Alyssa Sheena Tan (incumbent)	Lakas–CMD	68,743	71.88
Otep Miranda	Aksyon Demokratiko	19,208	20.08
Arlene Alvarez-Reyes	Nationalist People's Coalition	7,690	8.04
Total		95,641	100.00

== Vice mayor ==
Incumbent Alvin Abaya (Partido Demokratiko Pilipino) is term-limited. Abaya was re-elected with 49.04% of the vote in 2022.

=== Candidates ===
The following candidates are included in the ballot:

No.	Candidate	Party
1	Kit Galang	Independent
2	Gene Jose	Partido Demokratiko Pilipino
3	Jigs Miranda	Aksyon Demokratiko
4	Maximin Navarro	Nationalist People's Coalition
5	Jamayne Tan	Lakas–CMD

=== Results ===
Candidate	Party	Votes	%
Jamayne Tan	Lakas–CMD	48,292	53.56
Jigs Miranda	Aksyon Demokratiko	26,618	29.52
Maximin Navarro	Nationalist People's Coalition	14,601	16.19
Kit Galang	Independent	505	0.56
Gene Jose	Partido Demokratiko Pilipino	153	0.17
Total		90,169	100.00

== City Council ==
The Santiago City Council is composed of 13 councilors, 10 of whom are elected.

=== Retiring and term-limited councilors ===
The following councilors are retiring:

- Arlene Alvarez-Reyes (Nationalist People's Coalition), running for mayor of Santiago
- Jigs Miranda (Aksyon Demokratiko), running for vice mayor of Santiago

The following board members are term-limited:

- KC Bautista (Partido Demokratiko Pilipino)
- Paul de Jesus (Partido Demokratiko Pilipino)
- Jamayne Tan (Lakas–CMD), running for vice mayor of Santiago
- Resie Turingan (Partido Demokratiko Pilipino)

=== Overview ===
Party	Votes	%	Seats
Lakas–CMD	421,843	59.37	9
Aksyon Demokratiko	75,034	10.56	1
Nationalist People's Coalition	73,371	10.33	0
Liberal Party	32,205	4.53	0
Partido Demokratiko Pilipino	6,266	0.88	0
Partido Federal ng Pilipinas	1,004	0.14	0
Independent	100,812	14.19	0
Ex officio seats			2
Total	710,535	100.00	12

=== Candidates ===
The following candidates are included in the ballot:

No.	Candidate	Party
1	Anton Abaya	Lakas–CMD
2	Aliyah Aggabao	Aksyon Demokratiko
3	Vinchy Aggabao	Independent
4	Iverson George Barangan	Independent
5	Boni Bartolome	Aksyon Demokratiko
6	Pia Bautista	Lakas–CMD
7	Jun Cabucana (incumbent)	Liberal Party
8	Poklet Capun-an	Aksyon Demokratiko
9	Aga Castillo	Nationalist People's Coalition
10	Louie Castriciones	Partido Federal ng Pilipinas
11	Gibet Chan	Aksyon Demokratiko
12	Olan Chan (incumbent)	Lakas–CMD
13	RC Co	Aksyon Demokratiko
14	Jomae de Jesus	Lakas–CMD
15	Michael de Jesus	Independent
16	Carlo de Luna	Lakas–CMD
17	Michael Dungo	Independent
18	Neth Jose	Partido Demokratiko Pilipino
19	Pandong Lugod	Lakas–CMD
20	Aysen Marrero	Nationalist People's Coalition
21	Sherman Miguel (incumbent)	Lakas–CMD
22	Marlon Miranda	Independent
23	Pempe Miranda	Independent
24	Soc Navarro	Independent
25	Kay Perez	Nationalist People's Coalition
26	Russel Ponce	Lakas–CMD
27	Eunice Sable (incumbent)	Lakas–CMD
28	Eric Salcedo	Aksyon Demokratiko
29	Jayson Sanchez	Partido Demokratiko Pilipino
30	Lessa Sarangaya	Nationalist People's Coalition
31	Monching Sarangaya	Independent
32	Gino Abaya Siquian	Lakas–CMD
33	Mark Sotto	Nationalist People's Coalition
34	Hubert Taguinod	Liberal Party
35	King Umaguing	Independent

=== Results ===
Candidate	Party	Votes	%
Eunice Sable (incumbent)	Lakas–CMD	52,085	7.33
Pia Bautista	Lakas–CMD	50,576	7.12
Sherman Miguel (incumbent)	Lakas–CMD	50,566	7.12
Anton Abaya	Lakas–CMD	49,106	6.91
Jomae de Jesus	Lakas–CMD	41,699	5.87
RC Co	Aksyon Demokratiko	40,787	5.74
Russel Ponce	Lakas–CMD	39,428	5.55
Gino Abaya Siquian	Lakas–CMD	39,293	5.53
Carlo de Luna	Lakas–CMD	37,674	5.30
Olan Chan (incumbent)	Lakas–CMD	34,004	4.79
Pandong Lugod	Lakas–CMD	27,412	3.86
Michael de Jesus	Independent	27,160	3.82
Jun Cabucana (incumbent)	Liberal Party	26,429	3.72
Aysen Marrero	Nationalist People's Coalition	24,864	3.50
Vinchy Aggabao	Independent	24,479	3.45
Soc Navarro	Independent	16,784	2.36
Kay Perez	Nationalist People's Coalition	15,112	2.13
Pempe Miranda	Independent	13,345	1.88
Lessa Sarangaya	Nationalist People's Coalition	12,552	1.77
Aga Castillo	Nationalist People's Coalition	11,354	1.60
Gibet Chan	Aksyon Demokratiko	11,131	1.57
Mark Sotto	Nationalist People's Coalition	9,489	1.34
Aliyah Aggabao	Aksyon Demokratiko	6,668	0.94
Poklet Capun-an	Aksyon Demokratiko	6,147	0.87
Hubert Taguinod	Liberal Party	5,776	0.81
Boni Bartolome	Aksyon Demokratiko	5,663	0.80
Monching Sarangaya	Independent	4,912	0.69
Eric Salcedo	Aksyon Demokratiko	4,638	0.65
Iverson George Barangan	Independent	4,522	0.64
Michael Dungo	Independent	4,224	0.59
Marlon Miranda	Independent	3,754	0.53
Neth Jose	Partido Demokratiko Pilipino	3,321	0.47
Jayson Sanchez	Partido Demokratiko Pilipino	2,945	0.41
King Umaguing	Independent	1,632	0.23
Louie Castriciones	Partido Federal ng Pilipinas	1,004	0.14
Total		710,535	100.00
