= DWKB =

Philippine radio station

- Santiago; Philippines
- Broadcast area: Western Isabela and surrounding areas
- Frequency: 99.3 MHz

Programming
- Format: Silent

Ownership
- Owner: Bright Light Broadcasting

History
- First air date: 1992
- Last air date: 2003

Technical information
- Licensing authority: NTC

DWKB (99.3 FM) was a radio station owned and operated by Bright Light Broadcasting.
