= DWMX =

Radio station in Isabela, Philippines

Sweet 97.7 (DWMX)
- Santiago; Philippines
- Broadcast area: Western Isabela and surrounding areas
- Frequency: 97.7 MHz
- Branding: Sweet 97.7

Programming
- Languages: English, Filipino
- Format: Contemporary MOR, OPM, Talk

Ownership
- Owner: Soundstream Broadcasting Corporation

History
- First air date: 1996
- Former names: Mix FM
- Call sign meaning: Mix FM (former branding)

Technical information
- Licensing authority: NTC
- Power: 5,000 watts

DWMX (97.7 FM), broadcasting as Sweet 97.7, is a radio station owned and operated by Soundstream Broadcasting Corporation. The station's studio and transmitter are located at the 3rd Floor, Heritage Commercial Complex, Maharlika Highway, Brgy. Malvar, Santiago, Isabela.
