= My Love Will Make You Disappear =

2025 romantic comedy film by Chad Vidanes

- Theatrical release poster
- Directed by: Chad V. Vidanes
- Screenplay by: Patrick Valencia; Isabella Policarpio
- Story by: Prime Cruz
- Produced by: Daisy Cayanan-Mejares; Marjorie B. Lachica
- Starring: Kim Chiu; Paulo Avelino
- Cinematography: Yves Real Jamero
- Edited by: Renard Torres
- Music by: Cesar Francis S. Concio
- Production companies: ABS-CBN Studios; Star Cinema
- Distributed by: ABS-CBN Film Productions
- Release date: 26 March 2025
- Running time: 104 minutes
- Country: Philippines
- Language: Filipino
- Box office: ₱173 million

My Love Will Make You Disappear is a 2025 Philippine romantic comedy film directed by Chad V. Vidanes from a story by Prime Cruz and a screenplay by Patrick Valencia and Isabella Policarpio. It stars Kim Chiu and Paulo Avelino in their first film project. The film revolves around the romance between a woman believing she is cursed to make her loved ones disappear and her heartbroken landlord who wants to disappear.

Produced by ABS-CBN Studios and Star Cinema and distributed by ABS-CBN Film Productions, the film was theatrically released in the Philippines on March 26, 2025.

== Plot ==
Sari (Kim Chiu), a woman who loses every man she loves, and Jolo (Paulo Avelino), a struggling landlord, cross paths as they strive to save a community from displacement.

== Cast ==
=== Main cast ===
- Kim Chiu as Samantha "Sari" Gonzales
- Paulo Avelino as Jacob "Jolo" Antonio

=== Supporting cast ===
- Wilma Doesnt as Aling Nora "Nida"
- Lovely Abella as Jheng
- Benj Manalo as Ritchie
- Nico Antonio as Bruno
- Migs Almendras as Jesse
- Martin Escudero as Rom
- Karina Bautista as Lyka Gonzales
- Jeremiah Lisbo as Carlo
- Melai Cantiveros as Cookie (voice)
- Peewee O'Hara as Lola Remy
- Bart Guingona as Jonathan Antonio
- Frenchie Dy as Shari
- Charm Aranton as Lucy
- Marnie Lapus as Rosanna
- Alyssa Muhlach as Mischa
- Brian Sy as Darren
- Atasha Franco as Ashley "Mikmik" Bartolome
- Kelsey Lasam as Young Sari
- Lucas Andalio as Young Jolo
- Rufa Mae Quinto as Madame Tala
- Bernard Palanca as Raymond "Boss Poyo"
- Jennica Garcia as Ella Gonzales
- Fyang Smith as Larah
- JM Ibarra as Mico "Tim"

=== Special participation ===
- Piolo Pascual as Papa P (Cameo)
- Moi Bien as Personal Assistant of Papa P

== Release ==
My Love Will Make You Disappear was released in the Philippines on March 26, 2025. The film was originally set to release on February 12, 2025 (seven days after supposed release date of Darryl Yap's The Rapists of Pepsi Paloma) before moving to its new release date to expand opportunities in North American market. It was released in North American theaters on March 28, 2025.

== Reception ==
=== Box office ===
My Love Will Make You Disappear earned ₱40 million as of March 29, 2025, making it the highest opening day gross on a Filipino film in 2025 and 0 on its US opening day. The film earned ₱100 million in the box office worldwide as of March 31, 2025. The film earned $500,000 on its opening weekend in North America. As of May 7, 2025, the film earned ₱173 million worldwide.
