= Saan? =

Single by Maki

from the EP Tanong
- Language: Filipino
- English title: Where?
- Released: March 31, 2023
- Genre: Pop
- Length: 3:26
- Label: Tarsier Records
- Songwriter: Ralph William Datoon
- Producers: Moophs; Nhiko Sabiniano

Maki singles chronology
"Gusto Ko Nang Bumitaw (R&B Version)" (2022)	"Saan?" (2023)	"Bakit?" (2023)

Saan? (lit. 'Where?') is a single by Filipino singer Maki. It was released as a digital pre-single for Maki's first extended play "Tanong" on March 31, 2023, through Tarsier Records, and was produced by Nhiko Sabiniano. "Saan?" is a pop alternative song that combines mellow and modern elements, expressing feelings of longing and distance. Its lyrics draw on themes of memory and separation. He wrote the song during a visit to the University of the Philippines.

== Background and release ==
After the successful single of "Gusto Ko Nang Bumitaw (R&B Version)" (lit. 'I Want To Let Go'), Maki released a song on March 31, 2023. The song was later revealed to be part of Maki's extended play, Tanong (lit. 'Question'), which was released on October 6, 2023. In a 2025 in interview, Maki said that "Saan?" and other component songs in Tanong were based on his personal experience of being abandoned by a former girlfriend.

== Composition ==
"Saan?" is three minutes and twenty-six seconds long, the song was produced by Moophs and Nhiko Sabiniano and composed by Maki himself, under his real name Ralph William Datoon. It has been described to be an pop alternative track that features a melancholic and fresh sounds, conveying themes of longing and separation. The lyrics explore the experience of revisiting familiar places in hopes of encountering someone from the past, reflecting on memories and contemplating the reasons behind the separation. Maki aims to comfort to listeners experiencing heartbreak, encouraging them to grieve, reflect and eventually move forward. Maki wrote the track during a visit to the University of the Philippines.

The song's official music video was released on April 19, 2023 and features Maki and actress Karina Bautista. Parts of the video were shot in Baguio. The video was also included in a short film trilogy titled Tanong (lit. 'Question') after its EP, and includes the music videos for the EP's other component tracks "Kailan?" (lit. 'When?') and "Bakit?" (lit. 'Why?').

== Promotion ==
Maki teased his song on TikTok a series of snippets and that went viral, garnering over 500,000 views. The teaser gained attention for their sentimental sound and lyrics.

On October 5, he performed "Saan" in a Live Jam on Rappler. He also performed the single on Wish 107.5 and Billboard Philippines Soundwave.

At his concert titled Kolorcoaster at the Araneta Coliseum in Quezon City, Maki performed a rendition of "Saan?" with altered lyrics.

== Commercial performance ==
Following its release on March 31, 2023, "Saan?" debuted at number fourteen on Billboard's Philippines Hot 100 chart. The song reached 100 million streams on Spotify.

== Charts ==
=== Weekly charts ===
Weekly chart performance for "Saan?"
Chart (2024)	Peak position
Philippines Hot 100 (Billboard Philippines)	16
Philippines Top Songs (Billboard Philippines)	11

=== Year-end charts ===
Year-end chart performance for "Dilaw"
Chart (2024)	Position
Philippines Hot 100 (Billboard Philippines)	23
Philippines Top Songs (Billboard Philippines)	14

Chart (2025)	Position
Philippines Hot 100 (Billboard Philippines)	80

== Accolades ==
Award	Year	Category	Result	Ref.
Awit Awards	2024	Song of the Year	Nominated	
Awit Awards	2024	Best Pop Recording	Nominated	
PMPC Star Awards for Music	2024	Song of the Year	Nominated	
PMPC Star Awards for Music	2024	Male Pop Artist of the Year	Won	
