= Santiago Cultural Institute =

Private Chinese school in Isabela, Philippines

- 怡省仙朝峨中華中學

Location
- Santiago, Isabela; Philippines
- Coordinates: 16°41′11″N 121°32′24″E

Information
- Type: Private, Secondary, Non-sectarian
- Established: 1948
- Principal: Engr. Jaime I. Go
- Grades: K to 12
- Campus: Urban

The Santiago Cultural Institute or SCI (simplified Chinese: 怡省仙朝峨中华中学; traditional Chinese: 怡省仙朝峨中華中學; pinyin: Yíshěng Xiān Cháo É Zhōnghuá Zhōngxué) is a private and non-sectarian academic institution. Founded in 1948, it is the only Chinese school in Santiago, Isabela, Philippines.

== History ==
The school was first established in 1948 and was known as the Santiago Chinese School then. Its classroom were built out of Nipa and bamboo at its former location at the heart of Santiago City (then Santiago, Isabela). Three years later the rooms were renovated using walls as construction materials to provide stronger protection from the elements and the weather. This school was home to many students for the next two decades.

However, as years passed by, the gradual increase in number of students began to pose a space problem. The problem of scarcity of classrooms to accommodate both the children from the Chinese community and non-ethnic families wishing to avail of the quality system of instructions of SCI for their children was obviously to be addressed. The eventual dearth of rooms and campus space prompted the school's Board of Trustees (then the board of directors) to seek solutions in order that the school can satisfy the educational yearnings of a sizable portion of the city's population. The most feasible solution was the construction of new school building. So in 1966, the school board bought a piece of property for the school's future relocation.

The board of trustees' foresight soon proved to be beneficial. In view of the burgeoning student population in 1976, the school authorities had no more option but to relocate to the newly acquired school site with an area of six thousand seven hundred square meters (acquired a decade before). The construction of project of the skill however entailed a big sum of money. Pursuing this under time constraint further complicated the problem. Considering the importance of the undertaking, the board of directors decided to push through with more vigor.

The groundwork for the construction of new school building at SCI's present location at Plaridel started in 1977. Hard-pressed for funds, the school administration and its board of trustees sought the support of the many magnanimous and philanthropic individuals and organizations through a fund raising drive. Auspiciously, the project was completed without any hitch. In 1978, the new school building was finally completed. This edifice has evolved as a concrete and symbolic marker of the cooperation, love, commitment, and hard-work rendered by different people who shared the same vision and aspirations for the youth of the generations to come.

The Santiago Cultural Institute is still located in the same 6,700 square meter lot Over the years since 1978, it has embarked on a number of modernization and upgrading programs in its educational curricula and facilities.
