= The Silent Noise =

Philippine crime drama television series

- Promotional poster
- Genre: Crime drama Thriller; Family
- Directed by: Onat Diaz
- Creative director: Ruel S. Bayani
- Starring: Angelica Panganiban; Zanjoe Marudo; KD Omalin; Zaijian Jaranilla; Mutya Orquia; Joem Bascon; Mylene Dizon
- Country of origin: Philippines
- Original languages: Filipino; Filipino Sign Language
- No. of episodes: 10

Production
- Executive producers: Carlo L. Katigbak; Cory V. Vidanes; Laurenti M. Dyogi
- Production locations: Morong, Bataan; Angeles City; Olongapo; San Antonio, Zambales
- Camera setup: Single-camera
- Running time: 45–63 minutes
- Production company: ABS-CBN Studios

Original release
- Network: Amazon Prime Video
- Release: March 20 – April 24, 2026

The Silent Noise is a Philippine family crime drama television series directed by Onat Diaz. It stars Angelica Panganiban, Zanjoe Marudo, Mylene Dizon, KD Omalin, Zaijian Jaranilla, and Mutya Orquia. The series premiered on Amazon Prime Video on March 20, 2026 to April 24, 2026.

== Premise ==
When a body is found in their small town, a deaf son must face the truth he's suppressed, risking the fragile truce his family fought to keep.

== Cast ==
=== Main cast ===
- Angelica Panganiban as Jackie Carpio
- Zanjoe Marudo as Anton Carpio
- Zaijian Jaranilla as Matteo Carpio
- Mutya Orquia as Pia Carpio
- KD Omalin as Eli Carpio
- Joem Bascon as Manu Cortez
- Mylene Dizon as Samantha Ignacio

=== Supporting cast ===
- Tommy Alejandrino as Kyle
- Karina Bautista as Jem
- Adriana Agcaoili as Dina
- Joel Saracho as Col. Del Mundo, Chief of Police of Escondido
- Ramon Christopher as Mayor Serge Dominguez, Mayor of Escondido
- Sharmaine Suarez as Officer Rissa Soriano
- Junjun Quintana as Ted Ignacio
- Kakki Teodoro as Sheila
- Ralph Malibunas as Hans
- Olive Isidro as Benilda Alfaro

== Episodes ==
No.	Title	Original release date
1	"Echoes"	March 20, 2026
When Eli's beloved teacher, Sam Ignacio, is found dead in an apparent suicide, the Carpio family is shaken to the core. As the deaf 10-year-old struggles with the loss of his beloved teacher, Jackie tries to hold their family together. But when new revelations cast doubt on the ruling, grief turns to fear, and the Carpios realize they may be pulled into a truth they are not ready to face.
2	"Fault Lines"	March 20, 2026
Amidst the preparations for Sam's wake, the town demands closure, but Jackie cannot ignore the doubts surrounding the suicide ruling. While she secretly searches for answers, Anton fights to protect their family from scandal. Detective Cortez digs into the inconsistencies in the case, but his search for the truth takes a dangerous turn.
3	"What Remains"	March 27, 2026
As the town gathers to honor Sam's life, Detective Cortez uncovers troubling inconsistencies in her case. When Sam's brother, Ted, is suddenly shot, Jackie's suspicions about her friend's death intensify. Meanwhile, Anton receives an unexpected offer from Mayor Dominguez.
4	"Cost of Silence"	March 27, 2026
Manu and Jackie suspect that Mayor Dominguez is involved in Sam's death. However, their alliance faces a hurdle when the detective receives a sudden promotion. Matteo grows burdened with Jem's pregnancy, causing him to cut ties with her. Hurt by his decision, Jem shares a revelation that shakes the Carpios to the core.
5	"The Confession"	April 10, 2026
Matteo finally comes clean to his parents after Jem hurls serious accusations against him online. Now a suspect in Sam's case, Jackie and Anton do everything they can to protect their son. However, the truth now hangs between Matteo's word and that of his resentful, pregnant ex-girlfriend. Later, a new confession emerges, raising more questions than answers.
6	"Butterfly Effect"	April 10, 2026
Even after Ted confesses to killing his own sister, Jackie doesn't believe that is the whole truth to the case. To Anton's horror, his phone buzzes with messages from Sam's number that demand a price for keeping his secrets. Meanwhile, Eli makes an unexpected friend, but not everyone in the family is welcoming.
7	"Breaking Point"	April 17, 2026
Seeking a breather from the chaos after Sam's death, the Carpios go on a camping trip meant to bring them closer. However, unresolved pain, guilt, and resentment resurface as Eli's grief drives him into danger. When fear and blame erupt, Anton reveals a devastating truth about his marriage, placing Jackie in a difficult position, and pushing the family closer to its breaking point.
8	"Between Silence"	April 17, 2026
Pia and Matteo are forced to face a truth long buried beneath years of silence-the fragile, fractured reality of their parents' marriage that is built on pretense and quiet resentment. Haunting flashbacks unravel the moments that tore Jackie and Anton apart, while also exposing the forbidden bond between Jackie and Sam.
9	"Edge of Silence"	April 24, 2026
Pia rebels against her parents in her own reckless way. Adding to her worries, Jackie realizes that someone witnessed her private moment with Sam-and fears she may finally uncover who pushed her friend to a tragic end. Meanwhile, having obtained crucial evidence in Sam's case, Detective Cortez gets more than he bargained for.
10	"Where Silence Ends"	April 24, 2026
Sam's case reopens, and her complicated relationship with Jackie is now out in the open. As the investigation closes in, Jackie and Anton remain firm in their claim that they knew nothing about her death. Meanwhile, even as his parents vow to take his secret to the grave, Eli's guilt gets the best of him-bringing a far darker truth to the brink.

== Production ==
=== Development and casting ===
On February 20, 2026, it was announced in a press statement that Angelica Panganiban and Zanjoe Marudo will star in the series with Zaijian Jaranilla, Mutya Orquia, Mylene Dizon, and debut actor KD Omalin. It is produced by ABS-CBN Studios. Additional cast are Joem Bascon, Tommy Alejandrino, Joel Saracho, Karina Bautista, Junjun Quintana, Kakki Teodoro, Ramon Christopher, and Ralph Malibunas.

== Marketing ==
The trailer of the series has been released on February 27, 2026.

== Release ==
The series was premiered on March 20, 2026 on Amazon Prime Video and consists of 10 episodes.

== Awards and nominations ==
Name of the award ceremony, year presented, award category, nominee(s) of the award, and the result of the nomination
Award	Year	Category	Nominee(s) / Work(s)	Result	Ref.
Global OTT Awards	2026	Best Lead Actress	Angelica Panganiban	Nominated	
Global OTT Awards	2026	Best Asian TV Series	The Silent Noise	Won	
