= Karen Bordador =

Filipino television and radio personality, host and actress

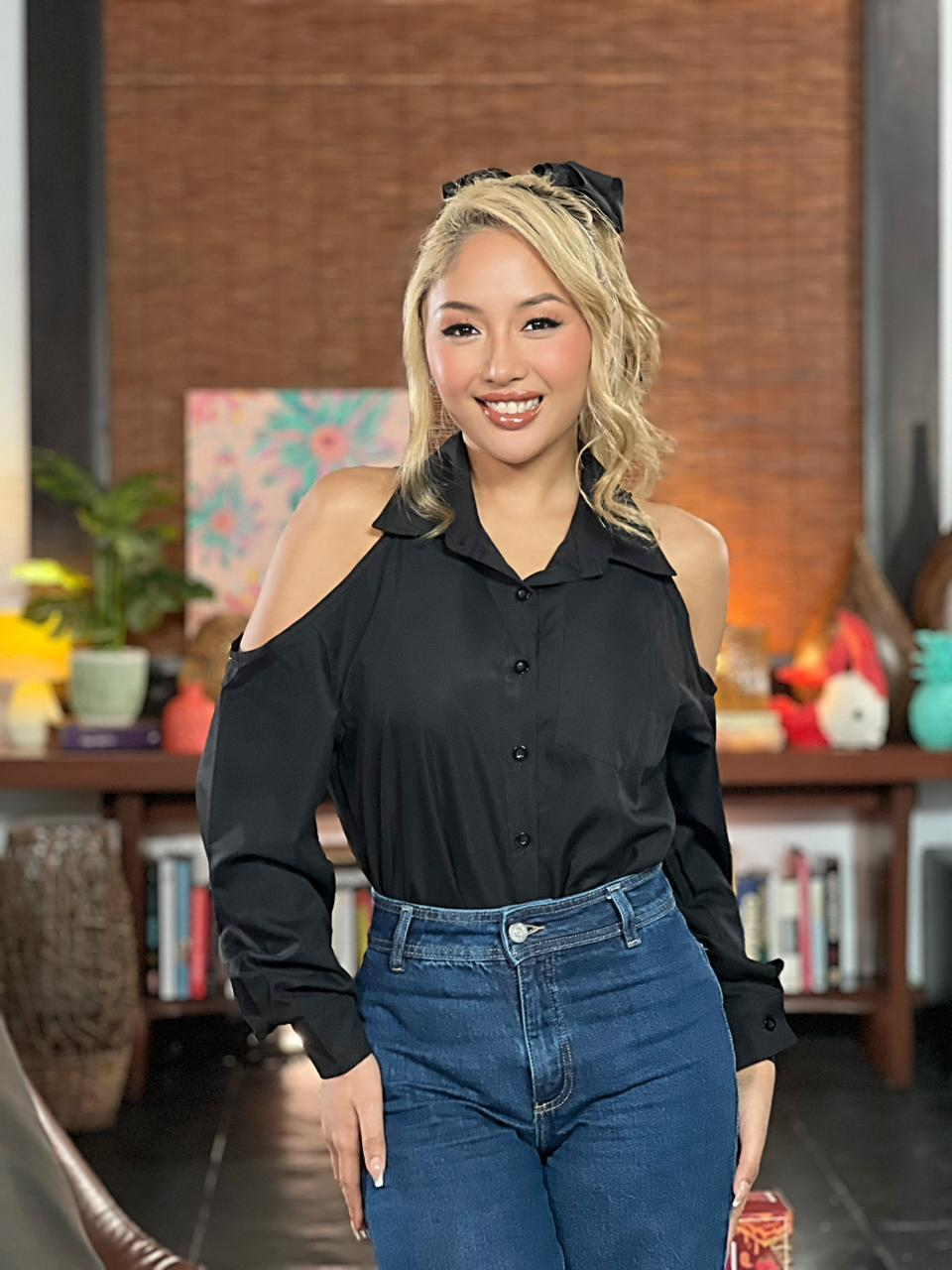
- Born: Karen Cortez Bordador; Makati, Philippines
- Occupations: Television and radio personality, host, entrepreneur, actress, and singer
- Years active: 2009–2016, 2021–present
- Known for: Hosting and media career, advocacy for prison reform and better rights for Persons Deprived of Liberty (PDL)
- Notable work: Pinoy Big Brother: Kumunity Season 10, radio host at Monster Radio RX 93.1, event host

Karen Cortez Bordador is a Filipino radio DJ, host, reality television personality and actress. She is best known for her work as a DJ at Monster Radio RX 93.1 and for her participation in Pinoy Big Brother: Kumunity Season 10.

Karen Bordador has also starred in various television programs, including I Do (TV series), TV Patrol as a Star Patroller, Luv U, and It's Showtime.

She was a main host on PIE NIGHT LONG, a current events and advice talk show on PIE Channel by ABS-CBN Corporation. Recently, she appeared in shows like Can't Buy Me Love (ABS-CBN), Open 24/7 (GMA), and Around The Arena on TV5.

In 2016, Bordador was arrested and charged with involvement in a drug-related case. After nearly five years of detention, she was acquitted in 2021. Her life story was featured in a two-part special on Maalaala Mo Kaya.

== Early life and education ==
Karen Cortez-Bordador was born in Makati in Metro Manila to Wilfredo and Norie Cortez-Bordador. She has an older sister named Jocelyn. She began her career as a model, landing several magazine projects, including features for FHM Philippines. Her modeling work led to brand endorsements, where she became a spokesperson for several companies, which ultimately caught the attention of the radio industry.

== Career ==
Kären Bordador auditioned for and won the Hottest Next DJ competition for Monster Radio RX 93.1.

In addition to her radio career, Bordador expanded into event hosting. She hosted the fan meeting for Korean actor-singer Seo In-guk and the premiere of Imagine You and Me.

She also ventured into television, making appearances on several popular shows, including TV Patrol as a Star Patroller, LUV U on ABS-CBN, and I Do.

Additionally, she became a lead host on PIE NIGHT LONG on the PIE Channel by ABS-CBN. Bordador also hosted her own radio talk show, K-Way, on Kstage Radio via Kumu.

=== Legal issues and acquittal ===
In August 2016, Bordador was arrested alongside her now ex-boyfriend in Pasig City as part of a drug operation. They were charged with the sale and possession of illegal drugs.

After nearly five years of legal proceedings, Bordador was acquitted of all charges and released from detention in June 2021. Following her release, Bordador became an advocate for prison reform and the improvement of the Philippine justice system, citing its slow pace and lack of resources as major issues. She has also become a resource person and advocate of better rights for Persons Deprived of Liberty.

=== Pinoy Big Brother: Kumunity Season 10 ===
Following her acquittal, Bordador joined the reality television show Pinoy Big Brother: Kumunity Season 10 as a celebrity housemate. During the season, she discussed how her experiences in prison shaped her perspective.

In the competition, Bordador faced two nominations for eviction. She survived her first nomination in Week 3 but was evicted during a double eviction in Week 7.

=== Current work ===
In 2023, Bordador was selected to host a fan meeting for Korean actor and singer Seo In-guk. She was a last-minute replacement for actress and content creator Kristel Fulgar, who was originally scheduled to host the event.

She is currently the marketing director of ENZI CORPORATION, a collection agency in the Philippines, as well as the marketing director of a satellite company in the country. In addition to her work as a host and influencer, Bordador has expanded her career into business. Prior to her arrest, she was the CEO of SisterSecrets, an online lifestyle website.

Her prison experiences were dramatized in a two-part episode of Maalaala Mo Kaya (MMK), a Philippine drama anthology, as part of its International Women's Month special. She was portrayed by Kaila Estrada. Bordador herself also played the role of a detainee Lizzie in the two episodes.

Bordador also has her own YouTube channel where she has two shows: The Brightside: Stories of Setups That Become the Greatest Comebacks and Kulongbia Stories: Untold Jail Stories.

In 2025, Karen Bordador released her debut single "Waving Red" on April 16, a day after her 33rd birthday.

== Filmography ==
=== Television ===
Year	Title	Role	Notes	Ref.
2010	Imortal	Customer	Guest	
2014	I Do	Contestant	Reality show	
2015	Luv U	Nikita Ponti	Guest; Season 2	
2021	Pinoy Big Brother	Celebrity Housemate	Season 10, Reality show	
2022	Maalaala Mo Kaya	Lizzie	Season 30, Episodes: "Selda", "Tablet"; Bordador plays the role of a detainee Lizzie, while Kaila Estrada plays as Bordador	
2024	Can't Buy Me Love	Margaret	Guest	
2024	Open 24/7	Shala	Episode 47	

== Discography ==
Year	Song	Album	Language	Composer	Notes	Ref.
2025	"Waving Red"	Single	English	Karen Bordador	FLM Creatives and Productions Inc	
