= Northeastern College =

Private college in Santiago, Isabela, Philippines

- Former names: Northeastern Institute (1941-
- Motto: Knowledge is Power
- Type: Private, nonsectarian
- Established: 1941; 85 years ago
- Founders: Leon Cadaoas aided by Atty. Francisco E. Pascual; Emeteria Bautista Pascual
- President: Tomas C. Bautista
- Location: Maharlika Hi-way, Villasis, Santiago City, Philippines; 16°41′24″N 121°33′09″E
- Campus: Urban Main: Santiago City Satellite: San Agustin, Isabela
- Hymn: NC Hymn
- Colors: Green and White
- Nickname: NC'nian
- Website: www.northeasterncollege.edu.ph
- Location in Luzon Location in the Philippines

The Northeastern College is a private, coeducational secondary and higher education institution located in Santiago, Isabela, Philippines.

== History ==
The Northeastern College was founded as The Northeastern College Institute, in 1941. It was the first secondary school in Isabela, and in 1944, expanded into offering an undergraduate college education.

== Academic Programs ==
It comprises the following colleges:

- College of Liberal Arts
- College of Law
- College of Business Administration & Accountancy
- College of Engineering
- College of Education
- College of Nursing
- College of Midwifery
- College of Hospitality & Restaurant Management
- College of Information Technology
- College of Criminology
