= Six Degrees of Separation from Lilia Cuntapay =

- Original poster
- Directed by: Antoinette H. Jadaone
- Written by: Antoinette H. Jadaone
- Produced by: Joenathann Alandy
- Starring: Lilia Cuntapay
- Cinematography: Solita Garcia
- Edited by: Glenn Ituriaga; Leo Ray Valencia
- Music by: Ayn Marie Dimaya
- Production companies: Cinema One Originals; PostManila
- Distributed by: Cinema One Originals
- Release dates: November 11, 2011 (Cinema One Originals Film Festival); October 31, 2012 (Philippines)
- Running time: 140 minutes
- Country: Philippines
- Languages: Filipino; English

Six Degrees of Separation from Lilia Cuntapay is a 2011 Philippine mockumentary film written and directed by Antoinette Jadaone and starring Lilia Cuntapay as herself. The story follows a veteran bit player through the days leading up to a fictionalized awards night where she is nominated as a Best Supporting Actress for the very first time in her 30-year career.

The film won six awards in the 2011 Cinema One Originals Digital Film Festival, including a Best Actress award for Cuntapay.

== Plot ==
Throughout the film, various people are asked whether they know about Lilia Cuntapay, a veteran actress frequently cast in the roles of a ghost or a monster in horror films; most struggle to recognize her, including actors she has worked with. Several directors also reminisce about Lilia's origins and her acting style.

An interviewer seeks out Lilia, an elderly woman living alone in a ramshackle house in a poor neighborhood. Lilia reminisces about her career as a bit player, and draws out a map of artists whom she has worked with, while her neighbors also interject throughout the film about their impressions of her, adding that she has at times been living in extreme poverty but manages to provide for the community when she has the resources. Lilia is shown to be relying on receiving casting calls for films through a neighbor's telephone for a living, while her daughter constantly asks when will she join her in the United States.

Lilia is overjoyed when she reads in a newspaper that she is nominated for her first accolade, an award for best supporting actress at the AFTAP Film Awards. Lilia then starts preparing to attend the award and rehearses throughout the film what she would say for her acceptance speech with the help of her neighbors and the interviewer. Meanwhile, Lilia accepts a bit playing job for an indie film and rehearses faithfully for the role with her niece Myra, despite her lines being brief and the film's director arranging to minimize her running time even further, fearing that the entire production would end up suffering over her reputation as a horror actress. She organizes a watch party at her house after a journalist interviews her about her nomination, but is dejected when the interview is not aired on TV Patrol. The next day, Lilia applies for a visa at the US embassy to visit her daughter.

Lilia, accompanied by Myra, attends the AFTAP awards night. She is dejected again when she is beaten to the award by Rio Locsin and tears the draft of her acceptance speech. However, Rio suddenly calls out Lilia and invites her to the stage, saying that she deserves to be recognized after her long career. As Rio hands Lilia the best actress trophy, an overawed Lilia prepares to make her speech, but as she states out her name, the film cuts to black.

== Cast ==
- Lilia Cuntapay as Herself
- Antoinette Jadaone as Interviewer
- Geraldine Villamil as Myra, Lilia’s niece
- Joel Saracho as Barangay Chairman Francis Resuello
- Raymond Rinoza
- Peque Gallaga as himself
- Lore Reyes as himself
- Topel Lee as himself
- Maryo J. de los Reyes as himself
- Bing Lao as himself
- Rio Locsin as herself
- Irma Adlawan as herself
- Dingdong Dantes as himself (cameo)
- Marian Rivera as herself (cameo)
- Kris Aquino as herself (cameo)
- Mercedes Cabral as herself (cameo)
- Raquel Villavicenco as herself (cameo)
- Camille Pratts as herself (cameo)
- Alwyn Uytingco as himself (cameo)
- Rez Cortez as himself (cameo)
- Karen delos Reyes as herself (cameo)

== Reception ==
=== Critical response ===
The film received mostly positive reviews from critics and Internet websites.

Karen of Audrey Magazine.com gave the film positive response saying “Six Degrees will have you laughing and feeling good throughout. Whether her portrayal in this mockumentary is just part of the show or not, Cuntapay comes off as very adorable, quirky, and imaginative.”

Philbert Ortiz Dy of the Click in the City.com wrote, "It is a film that I will be recommending to people for years to come. Beyond the fact that it’s funny and smart and well made, I feel that it is representative of everything that I dream of for the new Filipino cinema."

Jowana of Jowanabueser.com enjoyed the film and wrote, "films like this are an indication Philippine Cinema is far from dead. No. It is not dead because LILIA CUNTAPAY is rockin’ it like a mad ghost."

Francis Joseph Cruz of ABS-CBN News positively reacted both to the film and Cuntapay and also written, "Jadaone’s film, rooted in that fantasy that someone who has persisted for so long like Lilia Cuntapay may actually cross-over to be pitted against established and talented actresses in a glittery awards ceremonies, is a heartfelt tribute to each and every person who dared to dream dreams as big (and probably far-fetched) as the ones dreamt by Lilia Cuntapay."

Both the film and Cuntapay as a celebrity were big hits with the festival audience in Italy and South Korea.

=== Awards and nominations ===
Year	Association	Category	Recipient(s)	Result	Ref(s)
2011	Cinema One Originals Digital Film Festival	Best Actress	Lilia Cuntapay	Won	
2011	Cinema One Originals Digital Film Festival	Best Supporting Actress	Geraldine Villamil	Won	
2011	Cinema One Originals Digital Film Festival	Best Screenplay	Antoinette H. Jadaone	Won	
2011	Cinema One Originals Digital Film Festival	Best Editing	Glenn Ituriaga and Leo Ray Valencia	Won	
2011	Cinema One Originals Digital Film Festival	Audience Choice Award		Won	
2011	Cinema One Originals Digital Film Festival	Special Jury Prize		Won	
2012	35th Gawad URIAN Awards	Best Picture		Nominated	
2012	35th Gawad URIAN Awards	Best Director	Antoinette Jadaone	Nominated	
2012	35th Gawad URIAN Awards	Best Actress	Lilia Cuntapay	Nominated	
2012	35th Gawad URIAN Awards	Best Screenplay	Antoinette Jadaone	Nominated	
2012	35th Gawad URIAN Awards	Best Production Design	Rodrigo Ricio	Nominated	
2012	35th Gawad URIAN Awards	Best Film Editing	Leo Valencia; Glenn Ituriaga	Nominated	
2012	Udine Far East Film Festival	Official Selection		Won	
2012	Neuchâtel International Fantastic Film Festival	Official Selection		Won	
2012	Busan International Film Festival	Official Selection; A Window on Asian Cinema		Won	
2012	Cinemalaya Philippine Independent Film Festival	Exhibition		Won	
