= Alyssa Sheena Tan =

Filipino accountant, lawyer and politician (born 1992)

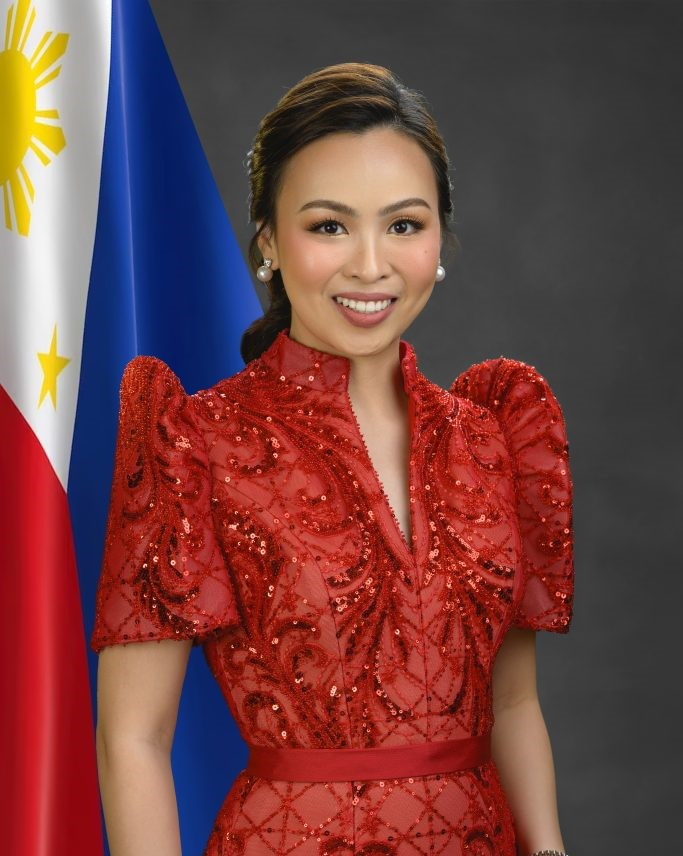
- Official portrait, 2022

27th Mayor of Santiago, Isabela
- Incumbent
- Assumed office June 30, 2022
- Vice Mayor: Alvin Abaya (2022–2025); Jamayne Tan (2025–present)
- Preceded by: Joseph Tan

Member of the House of Representatives from Isabela’s 4th District
- In office June 30, 2019 – June 20, 2022
- Preceded by: Ma. Lourdes Aggabao
- Succeeded by: Joseph Tan

Personal details
- Born: Alyssa Sheena Pua Tan; August 18, 1992 (age 34) Quezon City, Philippines
- Party: Lakas (2022–present)
- Other political affiliations: PDP–Laban (2021–2022); NUP (2019–2021); PFP (2018–2019)
- Spouse: Inno Dy (m. 2021)
- Children: 3
- Relatives: Joseph Tan (uncle); Bojie Dy (father-in-law)
- Education: De La Salle University (BS); Ateneo de Manila University (JD)
- Occupation: Politician, lawyer, accountant

Alyssa Sheena Tan-Dy (born Alyssa Sheena Pua Tan; August 18, 1992) is a Filipino certified public accountant, lawyer, and politician. She is currently serving as 27th mayor of Santiago, Isabela since 2022. She served as representative for 4th District of Isabela in the House of Representatives of the Philippines from 2019 to 2022.

== Early life and education ==
Tan was born on August 18, 1992, in Quezon City to Andy Tan and Shirley Pua. She studied at the Grace Christian College for her secondary education. She finished Bachelor of Science in accountancy at the De La Salle University. In 2012, she passed the certified public accountant licensure examination. She also finished Juris Doctor at the Ateneo de Manila University. In 2017, Tan passed the bar examination.

== Political career ==
In 2019, Tan was elected as representative fourth district of Isabela until 2022.

In 2020, Tan was one of the 70 representatives who voted to permanently deny the renewal of broadcasting franchise of television network ABS-CBN.

In 2022, Tan was elected as mayor of Santiago, Isabela.

== Personal life ==
On March 28, 2021, Tan is married to Inno Dy and has three children.

Her uncle, Joseph Tan, is currently serving as representative of the fourth district of Isabela since 2022. He served as mayor of Santiago, Isabela from 2013 to 2022.

== Electoral history ==
Electoral history of Alyssa Sheena Tan
Year	Office	Party	Votes received				Result
Year	Office	Party	Total	%	P.	Swing	Result
2019	Representative (Isabela–4th)	PFP	74,225	—N/a	1st	—N/a	Won
2022	Mayor of Santiago, Isabela	PDP–Laban	43,416	48.97%	1st	—N/a	Won
2025	Mayor of Santiago, Isabela	Lakas	68,743	71.88%	1st	—N/a	Won
