= I Do (TV series) =

- Genre: Reality competition, Romance
- Directed by: Nico Hernandez
- Presented by: Judy Ann Santos-Agoncillo; Jayson Gainza
- Opening theme: "Baby, I Do" by Juris
- Country of origin: Philippines
- Original language: Tagalog
- No. of episodes: 20

Production
- Executive producers: Alexis Jeffrey Asuncion, Charmaine Estrera
- Production locations: Cavite, Philippines
- Running time: 30-45 minutes

Original release
- Network: ABS-CBN
- Release: August 30 – November 15, 2014

I Do is a Philippine television reality show broadcast ABS-CBN. Hosted by Judy Ann Santos-Agoncillo and Jayson Gainza, it aired on the network's Yes Weekend evening line up from August 30 to November 15, 2014, replacing Pinoy Big Brother: All In.

It aired its last two episodes on November 8 to 15, 2014, showing the final ceremony and the coverage of the grand wedding of the winning couple of the show. In 2015, it was named as Best Reality Show by the 29th PMPC Star Awards For Television held in Manila, Philippines.

== Overview ==
=== Development ===
The show first made known in January 2013. Later on, the production team conducted auditions in Davao City, Cebu City, and Manila. Contestants must be couples who were 18 years old and above, and non-cohabiting or not in a live-in relationship.

=== Concept ===
Nine couples were secluded in a special village constructed in Cavite. They will undergo love session and counseling conducted by experts and they have to face different challenges that will test their relationships. During the show, aside from Santos-Agoncillo, several experts will guide them for the married life: Life coach Pia Acevedo, and Psychologist and Marriage Counselor Dr. Julian Montano.

=== Prize ===
The winning couple will win one million pesos, store franchise, a house and lot, and a grand wedding.

== Couples ==
The following are the nine couples that participated in the show

Couple	Finish
Jimmy Kim; 20, Seoul, South Korea; Merchandise Department head Kring Kim; 18, Quezon City; Marketing Manager	Winner; 56.80% of votes
Chad Fontanilla; 25, Rizal; On-call waiter Sheela Beterbo; 25, Rizal; Baker	Runner-up; 43.20% of votes
Chris Tan; 44, Mandaluyong; Businessman; Karen Bordador; 22, Makati; Radio DJ, host, model	Quit; November 3
Christian Busby; 22, England, United Kingdom; Model; Chelsea Robato; 24, Guam, United States; Model, real-estate agent	Eliminated; October 25
Emil Bautista; 28, Baguio; Businessman, grappling trainer Honey Avelino; 27, Baguio; Businesswoman	Eliminated; October 18
Harry Morris; 28, Negros Oriental; Athlete; Princess Manzon; 27, Cebu City; Project developer	Eliminated; October 5
Kaiser Boado; 24, Davao City; Real-estate agent Jzaenna Pantonial; 24, Davao City; Make-up artist	Eliminated; September 27
Carlo Medina; 30, Quezon City; Photographer, model Kara Mendez; 28, Quezon City; Singer, songwriter	Eliminated; September 20
Miko Trinidad; 20, Pasig; Marie Reyes; 21, Pasig	Quit; September 7

== See also ==
- List of programs broadcast by ABS-CBN
