= Joel Saracho =

Joselito "Joel" B. Saracho is a Filipino activist, actor, and former journalist. He is credited with coining the name "Magdalo" for the group of soldiers that engaged in the Oakwood mutiny in 2003.

== Career ==
In the mid-1980s, Saracho served as a reporter for the broadsheets Malaya (lit. 'Free') and Tinig ng Masa (lit. 'Voice of the masses') during the dictatorship of President Ferdinand Marcos. In December 1985, Saracho formed the group Discussions of Writers and Artists (DIWA) with A. R. Pascua, which sought to bring together journalists and artists from various fields to collaborate with each other.

In 1990, he formed Bagong Dugo, a theatre group that staged plays themed around politics and human rights.

In July 2003, while serving as a news writer during ABS-CBN News's coverage of the Oakwood mutiny by aggrieved soldiers, Saracho suggested using the name "Magdalo" to describe the group, citing the red armbands the soldiers wore that had a white sun at the center. Although his attribution for the red armbands to the flag of Katipunan's Magdalo faction was mistaken (the armbands more closely resembled the flag of Katipunan's Magdiwang faction), with the group itself actually using the name "Bagong Katipunan" (lit. 'New Katipunan'), the name "Magdalo" became widely used among the media to refer to the soldiers. Naval officer Antonio Trillanes IV, one of the spokespersons for the Bagong Katipunan during the mutiny, later acquiesced to using the Magdalo moniker for his own senatorial campaign in 2007; organizations representing members of Bagong Katipunan would also use the name, such as the Samahang Magdalo civic organization in 2008 and the Magdalo Party-List in 2010.

As a member of T'bak Inc., Saracho assisted Ferdinand Llanes in the compilation of stories set during the martial law period under President Marcos for the book Tibak Rising: Activism in the Days of Martial Law, a project initiated in 2004 which would later be published in July 2012.

In February 2020, Saracho was accused of narrating the video series Ang Totoong Narcolist that claimed president Rodrigo Duterte to be involved in the illegal drug trade, being charged by the Department of Justice with conspiracy to commit sedition alongside former senator Antonio Trillanes and Eduardo Acierto. After he posted bail in October, Saracho was joined by Trillanes in filing a motion to quash before the Quezon City Metropolitan Trial Court Branch 138.

== Filmography ==
=== Film ===
Year	Title	Role	Note(s)	Ref(s).
2011	Six Degrees of Separation from Lilia Cuntapay			
2013	Mana			
2014	From What Is Before	Father Guido	Original title: Mula sa Kung Ano ang Noon	
2014	Trophy Wife	Clerk of court		
2014	Maratabat: Pride and Honor			
2015	Town in a Lake		Original title: Matangtubig	
2015	Salvage	Bong		
2016	A Lullaby to the Sorrowful Mystery	Mang Karyo	Original title: Hele sa Hiwagang Hapis	
2016	Pektus		Short film	
2016	Contestant #4		Short film	
2016	2 Cool 2 Be 4gotten	Mr. Pangan		
2017	Pusit			
2017	The Bomb		Original title: Bomba	
2018	Season of the Devil	Ahas	Original title: Ang Panahon ng Halimaw	
2018	Liway			
2018	Signal Rock	Manoy Inting		
2018	Hintayan ng Langit	Elias / Tagasuri		
2019	Metamorphosis	Filipino priest 2		
2019	Lola Igna	Quack doctor		
2019	Culion	Father Salvino		
2020	Out of Body		Short film	
2020	Genus Pan	Inggo	Original title: Lahi, Hayop	
2021	Coming Home		Short film	
2021	The Exorsis	Mang Ruben		
2022	The Baseball Player			
2023	Ang Duyan ng Magiting			
2024	Balota	SPO2 Pastor		
2024	Ballad of a Blind Man	Claudio (The Dad)		
2025	Sampung Utos Kay Josh			
2025	Sa Oras ng Paghuhukom		Short film	
2025	Only We Know	Bert		
2025	Bar Boys: After School			
2026	Silenced Nights			

=== Television ===
Year	Title	Role	Note(s)	Ref.
1997	Wansapanataym		Episode: "Ang Hiwaga ng Gintong Piseta"	
2008	Ligaw na Bulaklak		Guest	
2012	Valiente	Attorney Manalad		
2015–2016	On the Wings of Love	Mama Lulu		
2016	Ipaglaban Mo!		Episode: "Tapat"	
2017	I Heart Davao	Manuel Aruban		
2018	Since I Found You	Berto		
2019	Sahaya	Usman		
2019	Tadhana		Episode: "Lindol"	
2019–2020	Starla	Ambo Soberano		
2020	Oh, Mando!	Mr. Siwa		
2021–2022	Marry Me, Marry You	Martin Mercado		
2022	Maalaala Mo Kaya	Various	2 episodes: "Logbook" and "Selda"	
2023	Simula sa Gitna	Elias / Tagasuri		
2023	Replacing Chef Chico	Carlon		
2024	Batang Quiapo	Apo Manuel		
2025	Sins of the Father	Pastor Ferdie Almonte	Guest	
2026	The Silent Noise			

== Theatre ==
Year	Title	Role	Note(s)	Ref(s).
1988	Magkano Ka, Walong Oras Isang Araw		Translation: "How Much Are You, Eight Hours One Day"	
2001	Divinas Palabras			
2007	Passion of the Christ	Lazarus		
2008	Hinabing Pakpak ng Ating Mga Anak		Translation: "Woven Wings of Our Children"	
2009; 2015	MLQ: Ang Buhay ni Manuel Luis Quezon	Claro M. Recto	Translation: "MLQ: The Life of Manuel Luis Quezon"	
