= Murder of the Maguad siblings =

2021 double murder in the Philippines

- Location: 6.95°N 124.88°E; Barangay Bagontapay, M'lang, Cotabato, Philippines
- Date: December 10, 2021
- Weapons: Knife, baseball bat, hammer, machete
- Criminal information
- Status: Convicted
- Motive: Envy, hatred (by Janice Sebial's own admission)
- Conviction: Murder (two counts)
- Criminal charge: Murder
- Penalty: 22–37 years of imprisonment
- Deaths: 2
- Victims: Crizzlle Gwynn Maguad; Crizvlle Louis Maguad
- Perpetrators: Janice Sebial Emuelin; Esmeraldo Canedo Jr.

The murder of the Maguad siblings, Crizzlle Gwynn Maguad and Crizvlle Louis "Boyboy" Orbe Maguad, occurred in their home in Barangay Bagontapay, M'lang, Cotabato, Philippines, on December 10, 2021. The incident drew national attention after it was revealed that the family's 16-year-old adopted daughter, Janice Sebial Emuelin—who had staged the crime scene as a home invasion—later confessed to carrying out the killing along with another minor. Both Sebial and her accomplice were sentenced to an indefinite period of 22–37 years of imprisonment. Sebial said she committed the crime out of envy and hatred toward the siblings.

== Background ==
The victims were the biological children of Cruz and Lovella Maguad, both public school teachers. Crizzlle Gwynn, 18, was a nursing student at the University of Southern Mindanao, and Crizvlle Louis, 16, was a Grade 10 student at M’lang National High School.

In July 2021, the Maguads took in a 16-year-old working student, Janice Sebial Emuelin, from Kidapawan. She had been introduced to the family by Gwynn through church-related activities. Although she had been involved in a theft incident—allegedly stealing over ₱10,000 from the family—Gwynn forgave her and convinced her parents to allow Janice to remain in their home.

== Killing ==
On December 10, 2021, at around 2:00 PM, Cruz Maguad was alerted by a neighbor about unusual activity at their residence. Upon arriving home, he discovered the bodies of his two children: Crizvlle Louis was found gagged, bound, and beaten to death, while Crizzlle Gwynn sustained 32 stab wounds. Investigators confirmed that household tools including a knife, baseball bat, hammer, and machete were used in the attack.

The family’s adopted daughter, Janice, was the only survivor. She claimed that masked men had entered the house and attacked the siblings while she hid in the bathroom. She also posted a Facebook status during the incident saying, "Please help us," prompting further scrutiny.

== Investigation ==
Authorities quickly noted inconsistencies in Janice’s story. There were no signs of forced entry, and her behavior, such as changing her Facebook profile and posting ambiguous status updates, further deepened suspicion.

Police discovered bloodstained clothing near an irrigation canal, and fingerprints on the murder weapons matched Janice. On December 16, 2021, Janice confessed to orchestrating the murders out of jealousy and resentment toward her adopted siblings. She also named a co-conspirator, Esmeraldo Cañedo Jr., an altar boy and fellow minor. Both were arrested and placed under the custody of the Department of Social Welfare and Development.

== Legal proceedings ==
Although both suspects were minors, Janice Sebial was found to have acted with discernment, allowing prosecutors to charge her with murder under the Juvenile Justice and Welfare Act of 2006 (Republic Act No. 9344).

On May 17, 2022, the Regional Trial Court (RTC) Branch 16 in Kabacan, Cotabato, presided over by Judge Alandrex Betoya, found Sebial and her accomplice guilty of murdering the Maguad siblings. The decision read that despite being a minor, Emuelin acted with discernment, a legal standard in the Philippines that allows for minors to be held criminally liable if they fully understand the consequences of their actions. The court sentenced her to an indefinite period of 22–37 years of imprisonment. It emphasized the gravity of the crime and the calculated manner by which it was executed, highlighting the betrayal of trust within the family unit. Emuelin's co-accused, also a minor, was similarly found to have acted with discernment and given the same penalty as Sebial. Both individuals were placed under the custody of the Department of Social Welfare and Development for appropriate rehabilitation measures.

== Public reaction ==
The incident triggered public outrage and widespread calls for justice. The hashtag #JusticeForMaguadSiblings trended on Philippine social media platforms. Many netizens and local leaders expressed sympathy for the grieving parents and voiced concerns about the risks of informal adoptions and shortcomings in child welfare systems.

Several public figures and local officials visited the Maguad family, and a ₱500,000 reward was offered for credible information related to the crime.

== Media adaptation ==
In May 2025, ABS-CBN's long-running drama anthology series, Maalaala Mo Kaya featured the Maguad case in a two-part episode entitled "The Silent House", starring Dimples Romana as Lovella Maguad, Joem Bascon as Cruz Maguad, Criza Taa as Crizzle Gwynn Maguad, Miguel Vergara as Crizvlle Louis "Boyboy" Maguad, and Karina Bautista as Janice Sebial Emuelin.

The episode focused on the emotional and psychological impact of the tragedy on the Maguad family and raised awareness about familial trust, grief, and forgiveness. Amid the positive feedback the episode received upon airing, ABS-CBN released a statement addressing the adoption and foster care community's concern that the episode could "reinforce harmful stereotypes about adopted and fostered children".
