= Karina Bautista =

Filipina actress (born 2002)

- Born: Karina Bautista Nakagawa; April 29, 2002 (age 24); Santiago, Isabela, Philippines
- Occupation: Actress
- Years active: 2018–present
- Agent(s): Star Magic (2018–present); Rise Artists Studio (2021–present)
- Height: 1.57 m (5 ft 2 in)

Karina Bautista Nakagawa (born April 29, 2002) is a Filipino actress. She was one of the first batch finalists of Pinoy Big Brother: Otso in 2018. She later appeared in television series including Sandugo (2019), The Four Bad Boys and Me (2020), Ampalaya Chronicles (2020), Viral Scandal (2021), Hoy, Love You! (2021), and Halfmates (2024), as well as in films including Fruitcake (2024) and My Love Will Make You Disappear (2025).

She gained wider recognition after appearing in the television anthology series Maalaala Mo Kaya (2025), for an episode features the story of the Maguad siblings murder case, playing the antagonist convict Janice.

== Life and career ==
Bautista was born in Santiago, Isabela to a Filipino mother and a Japanese father with an American citizenship. She is of Ilocano and Japanese descent. She was raised by her grandmother, Celeste, and other relatives while her parents worked abroad. However, due to financial disputes, she had to leave their care and stayed in another relative’s apartment for a year. At 13, she chose to live independently in a boarding house.

Bautista auditioned for Star Hunt and later joined Pinoy Big Brother: Otso in 2018, where she became one of the first batch finalists. In 2021, she joined the second batch of ABS-CBN’s talent management arm, Rise Artists Studio. Through her on-screen partnership with Aljon Mendoza, she gained more television appearances on the network. In August 2024, she enlisted in the Philippine Navy Reserve. In 2026, Bautista was cast among the third batch of 20 celebrities or "lucky stars" in the another ABS-CBN game show Kapamilya, Deal or No Deal and was selected as a contestant to play on the November 15, 2026 episode, and won ₱300 after turning down the final offer of ₱220 (her other briefcase contained the ₱1 minimum).

Bautista was in a relationship with Philippines men's national ice hockey team player Manny Billones from 2023 to 2026.

== Filmography ==
=== Film ===
Year	Title	Role	Notes	Ref.
2023	Tanong	Girlfriend		
2024	Fruitcake	Stacy	Supporting role	
2025	My Love Will Make You Disappear	Lyka	Supporting role	
2025	The Last Goodbye	Elsa	Supporting role	
2025	The Last Resort	Katrina		
2025	Shake, Rattle & Roll: Evil Origins	Callie	Supporting role	
2026	The Lotto Winner	Mia		

=== Television ===
Year	Title	Role	Notes	Ref.
2018–2019	Pinoy Big Brother: Otso	Housemate	Reality show	
2019–2020	Sandugo	Andrea "Andeng" Kalaw		
2020	Ampalaya Chronicles	Peng	Episode: "Labyu Hehe"	
2020	The Four Bad Boys and Me	Tiffany Chua		
2021–2022	Hoy, Love You!	Kara		
2021–2022	Viral Scandal	Beatriz "Bea" M. Sicat		
2022	Love Bites	Aira	Episode: "One Post Away"	
2022	The Iron Heart	young Cassandra	Episode: "Core and Iron"	
2022	Maalaala Mo Kaya	Theza Aliporo/Iris	Episodes: "Caramel Sundae", "Family Picture", "Bote", and "Passport"	
2023–2024	Papa What is Love	Alex	Season 2	
2023–2024	Can't Buy Me Love	Bougie Dimaranan		
2025	Maalaala Mo Kaya	Jasmine Manuel	Episodes: "Bahay" and "Envelope"	
2026	The Silent Noise	Jem		
2026	The Loyalty Game	Megan Valdez		
2026	True Manila Encounters	Pearl	Episodes: "Undressed"	
2026	Kapamilya, Deal or No Deal	Herself/Contestant	Briefcase holder 4/Contestant (aired November 15, 2026)	

=== Web series ===
Year	Title	Role	Notes	Ref.
2023	Hex Boyfriend	Raya		
2024	Halfmates	Joane		
2025	Si Sol at Si Luna	Ara Meneses		

=== Microdrama ===
Year	Title	Role	Notes	Ref.
2026	Maid to Be a Princess	Ella		
2026	Will You Fake Marry Me?	Sheryn Cruz		
	The Missing Wife	Aila Sandoval		

=== Music videos ===
Title	Year	Director(s)	Ref.
"Saan?" (with Maki)	2023	Kashka Gaddi	
"Bakit?" (with Maki)	2023	Kashka Gaddi	
"Kailan?" (with Maki)	2023	Kashka Gaddi	
