= Santiago, Isabela =

Independent component city in Cagayan Valley, Philippines

Santiago
- Independent component city
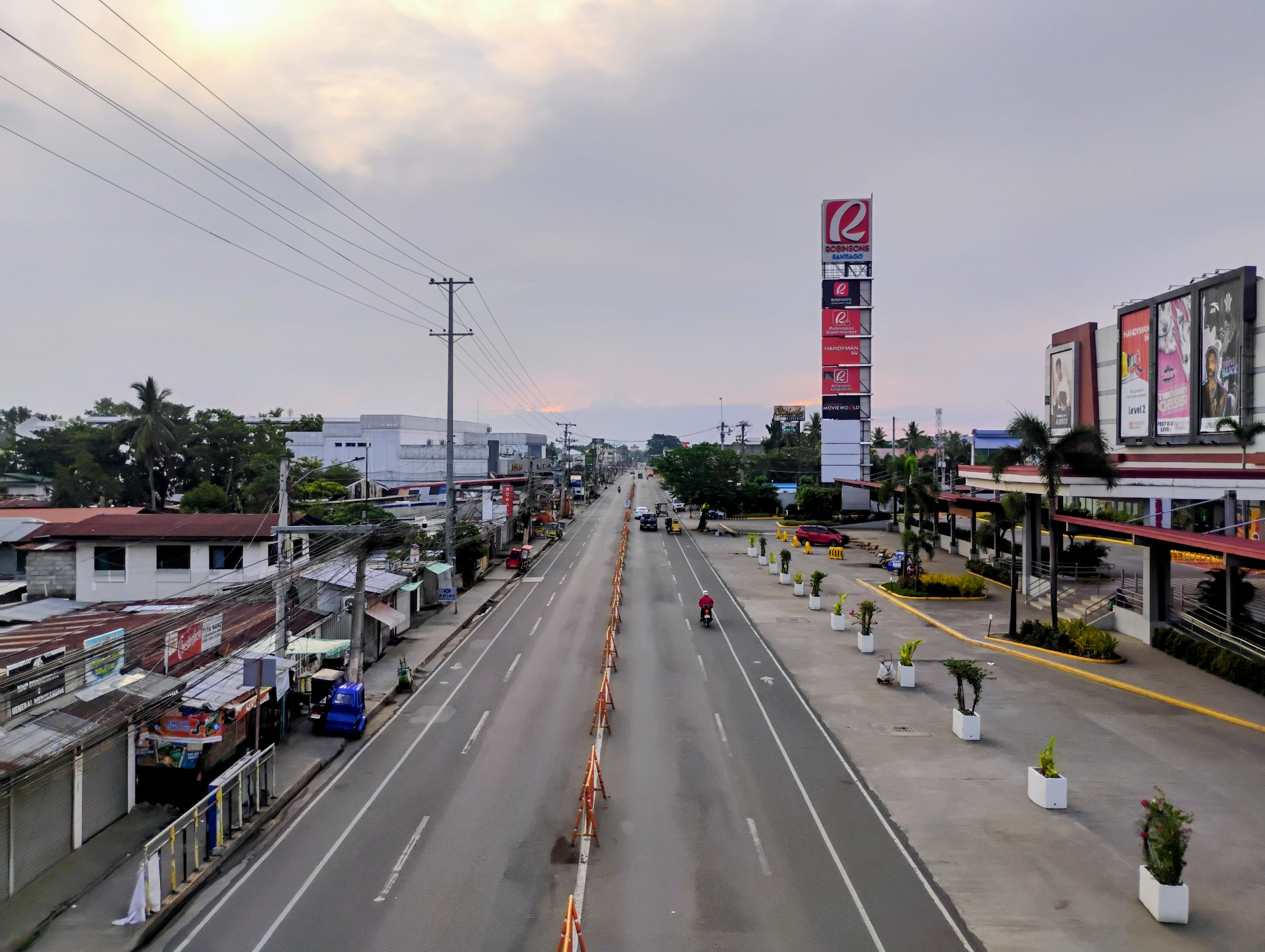
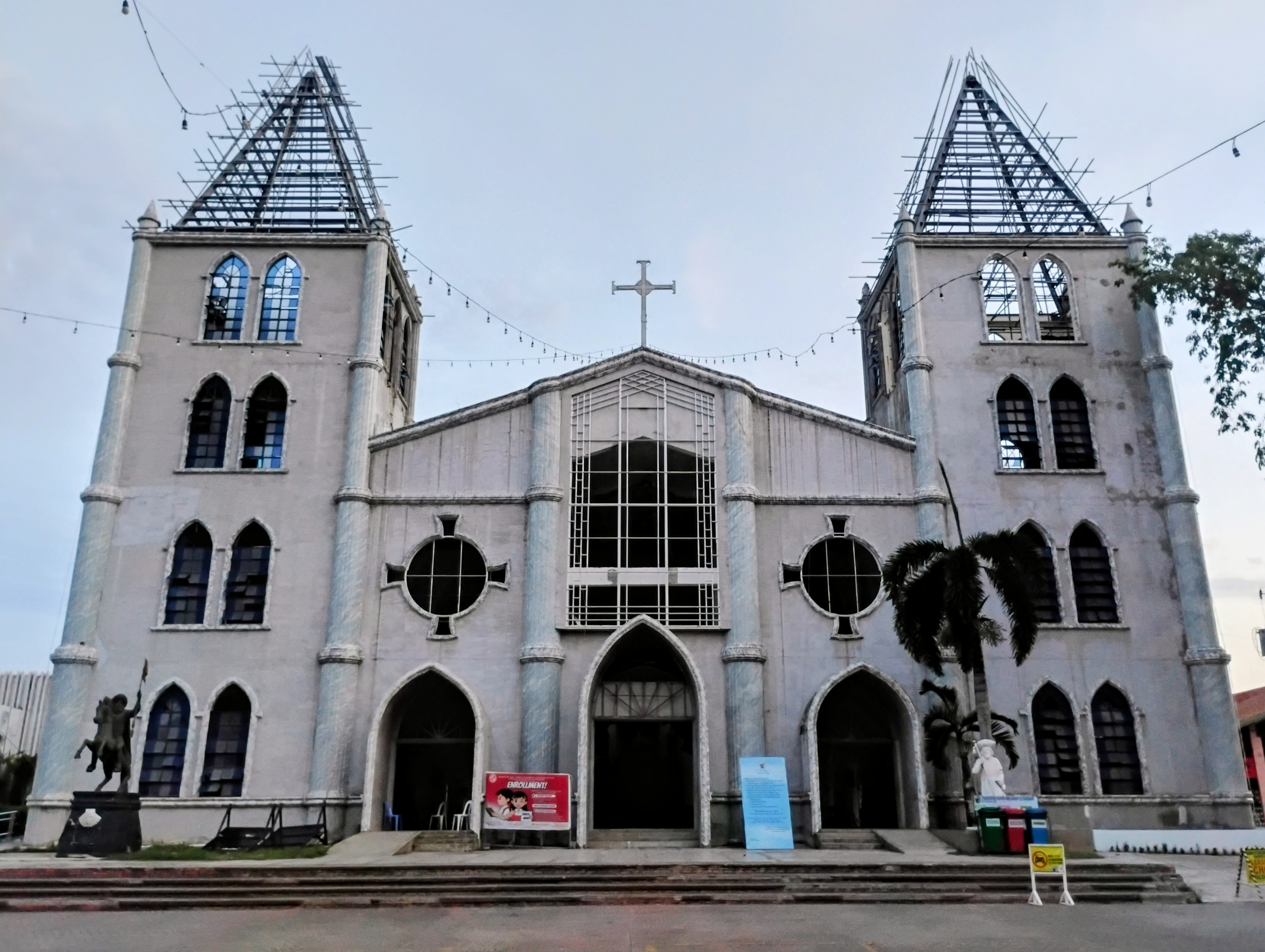
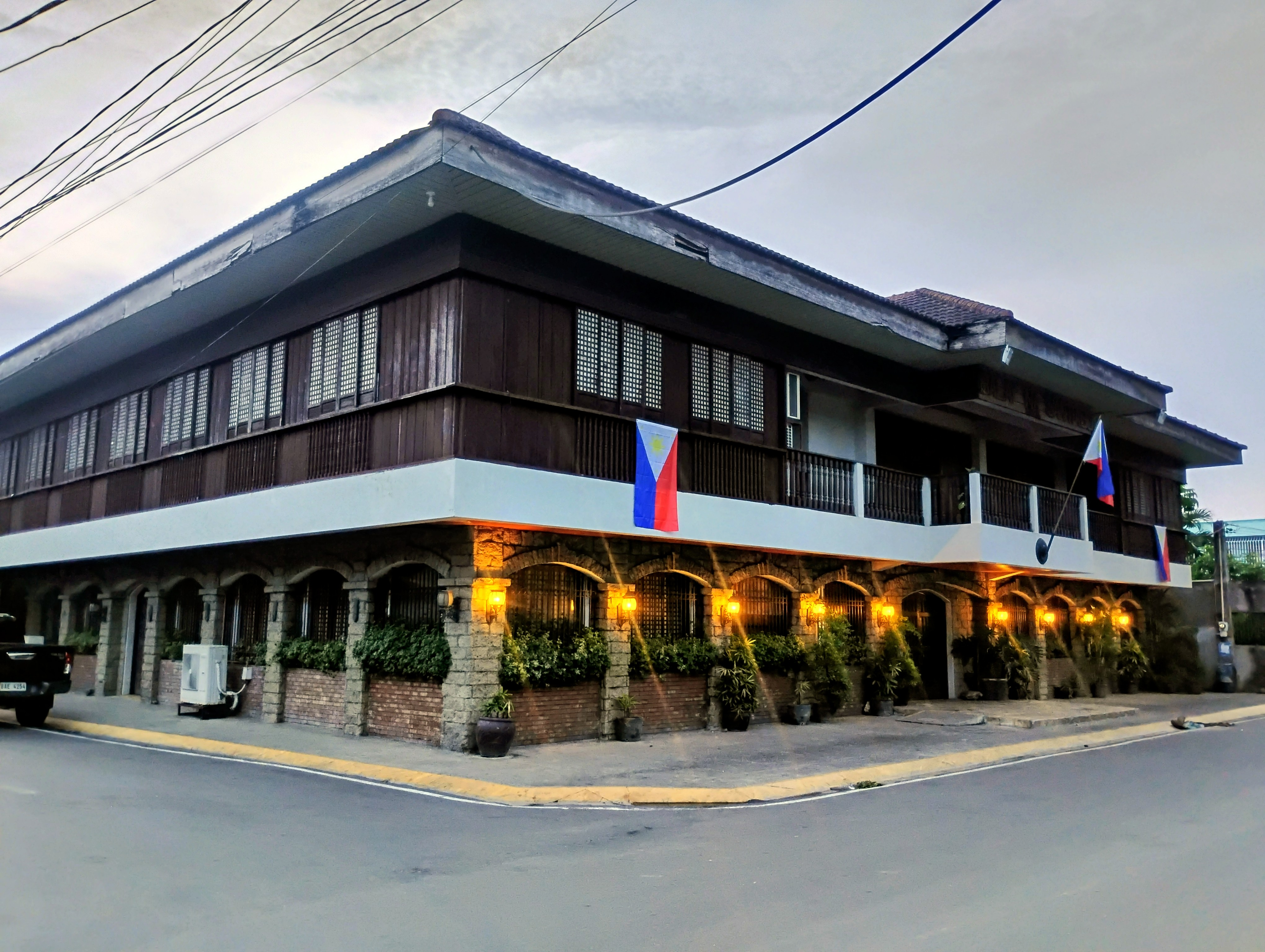
- Maharlika Highway along Santiago Saint James the Apostle Parish Church Balay na Santiago

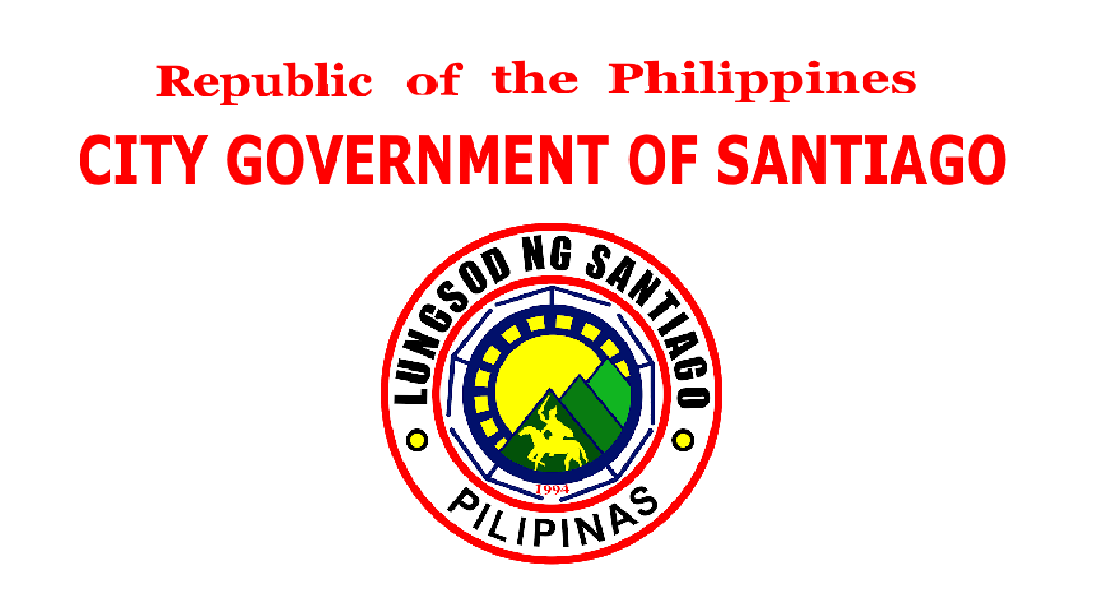
- Flag Seal
- Nickname: Queen City of the North
- Anthem: Santiago, Bayan ng Pag-Ibig (English: Santiago, the Town of Love)
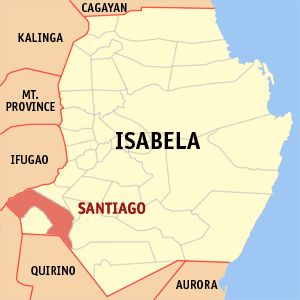
- Map of Isabela with Santiago highlighted
- Interactive map of Santiago
- Location within the Philippines
- Coordinates: 16°41′N 121°33′E
- Country: Philippines
- Region: Cagayan Valley
- Province: Isabela (geographically only)
- District: 4th district
- Founded: May 4, 1743
- Cityhood: July 6, 1994
- Named for: St. James the Great
- Barangays: 37 (see Barangays)

Government
  - Type: Sangguniang Panlungsod
  - Mayor: Alyssa Sheena T. Dy
  - Vice Mayor: Jamayne C. Tan
  - Representative: Joseph S. Tan
  - City Council: Members: Arlene A. Reyes; Paul C. de Jesus; Resureccion T. Ponce; Cassandra E. Sable; Katrina Camille B. Bautista; Jamayne C. Tan; Nicoline Shane A. Miranda; Orlando T. Chan; Marcelino C. Cabucana Jr.; Sherman A. Miguel
  - Electorate: 115,767 voters (2025)

Area
  - Total: 255.50 km^{2} (98.65 sq mi)
- Elevation: 156 m (512 ft)
- Highest elevation: 919 m (3,015 ft)
- Lowest elevation: 56 m (184 ft)

Population (2024 census)
  - Total: 150,313
  - Density: 588.31/km^{2} (1,523.7/sq mi)
  - Households: 36,334
- Demonym: Santiagueño

Economy
  - Income class: 1st city income class
  - Poverty incidence: 9.66% (2023)
  - Revenue: ₱ 26,357 million (2024)
  - Assets: ₱ 9,095 million (2024)
  - Expenditure: ₱ 2,095 million (2024)
  - Liabilities: ₱ 2,090 million (2024)

Service provider
  - Electricity: Isabela 1 Electric Cooperative (ISELCO 1)
- Time zone: UTC+8 (PST)
- ZIP code: 3311
- PSGC: 023135000
- IDD : area code: +63 (0)78
- Native languages: Ilocano; Gaddang; Tagalog
- Website: cityofsantiago.gov.ph

Santiago, officially the City of Santiago (Ilocano: Siudad ti Santiago; Ibanag: Siudad nat Santiago; Gaddang: Siudad na Santiago; Filipino: Lungsod ng Santiago), is an independent component city in the Cagayan Valley region of the Philippines. According to the 2024 census, it has a population of 150,313 people.

It is formerly known as Carig during the time of the Spanish, it is located between the southwestern part of Isabela and the northwestern boundary of Quirino in northeastern Luzon island of the Philippines. It is the gateway to the vast plains of Cagayan Valley.

Despite being statistically grouped by the Philippine Statistics Authority and geographically located within the boundaries of the province of Isabela, as well as part of the province's 4th District, Santiago is administratively and legally independent from the province, in accordance with Section 25 of the Local Government Code. It is also the second most populous city in Isabela after the capital city, Ilagan.

== Etymology ==
Santiago was previously a native settlement discovered by the early Spanish missionaries at the bank of the old Carig River (now Diadi River) from which its original name, Carig, was derived. When the Spanish settled in, it was named Pueblo of Santiago Apostol de Carig, with Santiago as the Spanish name of Saint James the Apostle. In the early 1950s, the Municipal President Vicente Carreon changed the name to simply Santiago.

== History ==
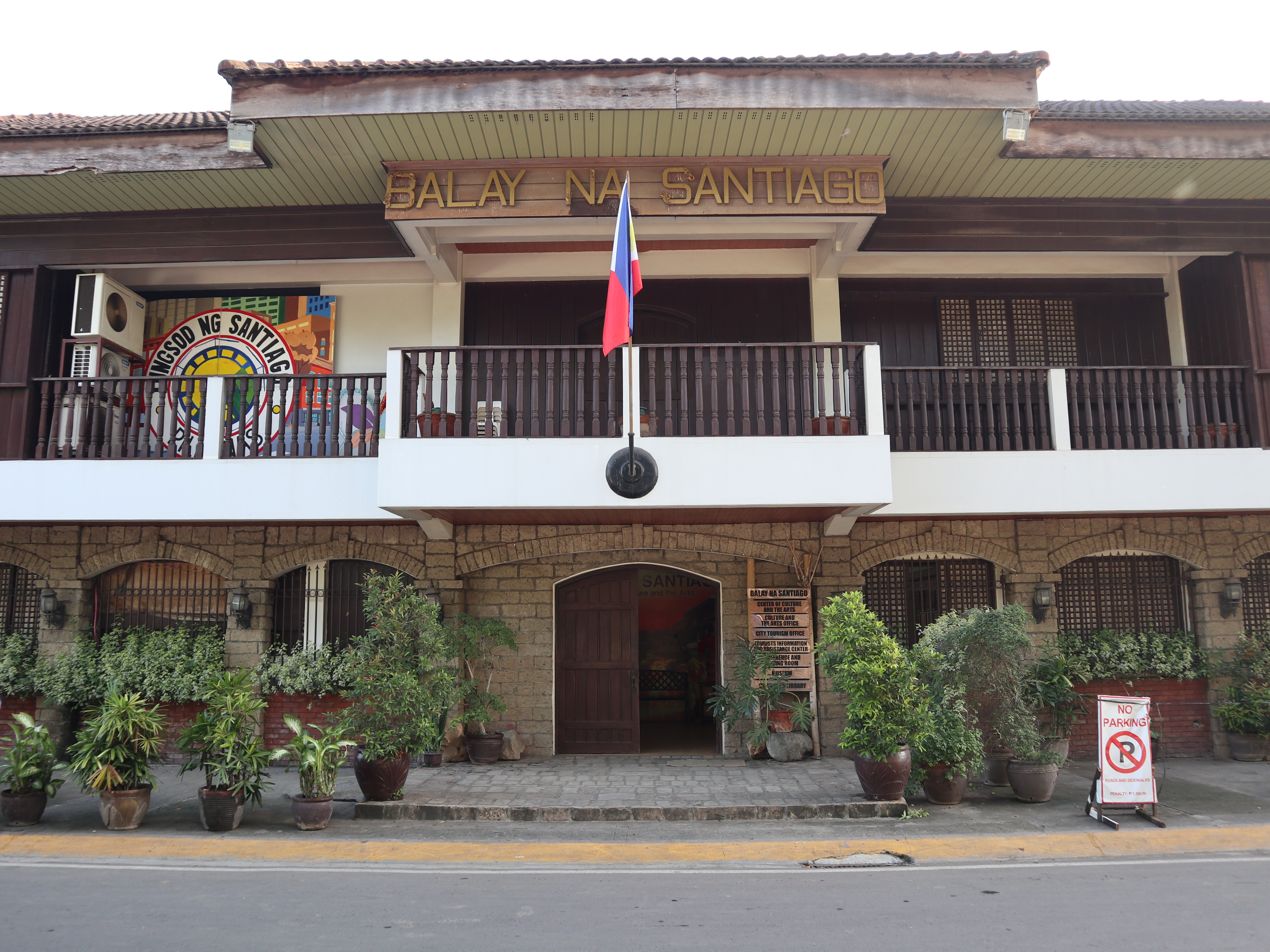
Balay na Santiago Ancestral house and museum

Carig was initially established in 1743 at the foothills of mount Dalayag between present-day Isabela and Nueva Vizcaya. A few years later, it was moved to its present location 15 kilometers away. Carig was also the site of a military garrison established by the Spaniards as a base for expeditions against unconquered tribes in present-day Ifugao and Quirino and to guard the mountain pass to Nueva Vizcaya.

The early inhabitants of Santiago were the Gaddangs and the Ibanags.

Santiago was originally a part of the province of Cagayan (comprising the whole Cagayan Valley region), which was reorganized as a political subdivision in 1583 with Nueva Segovia (now Lal-lo) as its capital.

When the province of Nueva Vizcaya was created in 1839, Santiago became part of the new province. On May 1, 1856, when the province of Isabela was carved out by a Royal Decree, Santiago was among the towns relinquished to the newly created province. The first five barrios after the Cadastral survey in 1927 were Patul, Batal, Nabbuan, Buenavista and Dubinan.

It was said that there were only about three Filipino-owned sari-sari stores in Santiago in 1917. The settlers acquired most of their merchandise and other provisions from Chinese traders in Echague, the landing zone for products intended for Santiago and other towns, owing to its proximity to the Cagayan River.

It was when the Villaverde Trail was opened when things were set in motion. It facilitated the entry of immigrants from various provinces in Luzon to the Cagayan Valley and Santiago absorbed a sizable share of these travelers. The new route served as an impetus for growth and introduced new technologies and business opportunities, and made Santiago a melting pot of different cultures.

In 1942, during World War II, Japanese forces occupied Santiago. In 1945, the town was liberated by the Filipino soldiers of the 1st, 2nd, 12th, 13th and 15th Infantry Division and the USAFIP-NL 11th Infantry Regiment of the Philippine Commonwealth Army, the 1st Constabulary Regiment of the Philippine Constabulary and the recognized guerrilla fighter units. Santiago survived through the war, although badly damaged, and from then on developed to become the leading trading and commercial city in Cagayan Valley.

=== Cityhood ===
On December 17, 1993, the bill converting Santiago into an independent component city was approved by the House of Representatives spearheaded by the then Mayor Jose "Pempe" Miranda. In the following year, the Senate Committee on Local Government approved another public hearing dated February 23, 1994.

On May 5, 1994, President Fidel V. Ramos signed Republic Act 7720. The plebiscite was held on July 6, 1994, showed that voters approved this conversion, making Santiago the first city in Cagayan Valley and 5th independent component city, after Cotabato City, Dagupan, Naga, and Ormoc.

On February 14, 1998, Republic Act 8528 repealed this statute transforming it to a component city. On December 29, 1999, the Supreme Court struck down the law and restored Santiago's independent cityhood.

==== Reversal attempts ====
During the 13th Congress, House Bill No. 3709, which sought to amend certain sections of Republic Act No. 7720, was filed by Isabela's 4th District Representative Anthony C. Miranda, but did not pass.

== Geography ==
The total land area of Santiago is 80% flat or nearly level land in the northwestern, eastern and western parts of the city. While adjacent areas have gently undulating and moderately rolling areas, and the remaining areas constitute steeply undulating and rolling lands. The Dariuk Hills is the highest point in the city.

The city sits on a vast area of predominantly flat and fertile land in the Cagayan Valley, surrounded by the Namamparang Mountains to the south, the Sierra Madre to the east and the Cordillera Mountain Range to the west alongside the Magat River.

Santiago is situated 76.44 kilometres (47.50 mi) south of the provincial capital Ilagan, and 359.28 kilometres (223.25 mi) north of Manila. It is located between 16º35’00” to 16º47’30” north latitude and 121º25’00” to 121º37’00” east longitude.

=== Barangays ===
Santiago is politically subdivided into 37 barangays. Each barangay consists of puroks while some have sitios.

PSGC	Barangay	Population			±% p.a.	
		2024		2010		
023135001	Abra	1.2%	1,756	1,580	▴	0.73%
023135002	Ambalatungan	1.0%	1,547	1,376	▴	0.82%
023135003	Balintocatoc (Dariuk)	2.5%	3,777	3,598	▴	0.34%
023135004	Baluarte	3.5%	5,225	4,282	▴	1.39%
023135005	Bannawag Norte	1.0%	1,436	1,177	▴	1.39%
023135006	Batal	5.6%	8,461	7,994	▴	0.39%
023135007	Buenavista (Sitio Carubucod)	2.7%	4,010	3,776	▴	0.42%
023135008	Cabulay	2.2%	3,320	3,452	▾	−0.27%
023135009	Calao East (Poblacion)	2.2%	3,259	4,111	▾	−1.60%
023135010	Calao West (Poblacion)	0.9%	1,411	1,024	▴	2.25%
023135011	Calaocan (Talab)	4.3%	6,496	6,176	▴	0.35%
023135012	Villa Gonzaga (Caralet)	1.1%	1,723	1,619	▴	0.43%
023135013	Centro East (Poblacion)	0.8%	1,223	1,823	▾	−2.73%
023135014	Centro West (Poblacion)	0.8%	1,185	2,375	▾	−4.70%
023135015	Divisoria (Lantaran)	2.9%	4,373	4,372	▴	0.00%
023135016	Dubinan East	1.3%	1,888	2,485	▾	−1.89%
023135017	Dubinan West	2.1%	3,103	3,312	▾	−0.45%
023135018	Luna (Palasian)	0.7%	1,100	1,003	▴	0.64%
023135019	Mabini	4.1%	6,223	7,724	▾	−1.49%
023135020	Malvar	2.3%	3,508	3,305	▴	0.41%
023135021	Nabbuan	2.3%	3,417	3,040	▴	0.81%
023135022	Naggasican	3.7%	5,560	5,379	▴	0.23%
023135023	Patul	3.6%	5,459	4,621	▴	1.16%
023135024	Plaridel (Dullit)	4.2%	6,245	6,531	▾	−0.31%
023135025	Rizal	9.2%	13,803	12,709	▴	0.57%
023135026	Rosario (Pakret)	7.6%	11,441	11,364	▴	0.05%
023135027	Sagana (Kaminurian)	3.0%	4,473	3,667	▴	1.39%
023135028	Salvador (Kapayakan)	1.3%	1,991	1,687	▴	1.15%
023135029	San Andres	1.2%	1,747	1,371	▴	1.69%
023135030	San Isidro	0.7%	1,050	848	▴	1.49%
023135031	San Jose (Matunga-tungao)	0.8%	1,195	1,032	▴	1.02%
023135032	Sinili (Casilihan)	0.9%	1,409	1,335	▴	0.37%
023135033	Sinsayon	2.1%	3,172	3,246	▾	−0.16%
023135034	Santa Rosa (Marubo-rubo)	0.5%	703	605	▴	1.05%
023135035	Victory Norte	3.1%	4,707	5,055	▾	−0.49%
023135036	Victory Sur	1.6%	2,348	2,166	▴	0.56%
023135037	Villasis	0.7%	1,026	1,584	▾	−2.96%
	Total		150,313	132,804	▴	0.86%

=== Climate ===
Santiago has a climate with no pronounced wet or dry season. Usually, the city has a considerably dry climate with minimum rainfall. The average yearly temperature is measured at 24.9 °C (76.8 °F). Annual and daily temperature variation is minimal. Temperature ranges are usually from 18 to 35 °C (64 to 95 °F).

Climate data for Santiago City
Month	Jan	Feb	Mar	Apr	May	Jun	Jul	Aug	Sep	Oct	Nov	Dec	Year
Mean daily maximum °C (°F)	27 (81)	27 (81)	29 (84)	28 (82)	27 (81)	25 (77)	26 (79)	27 (81)	31 (88)	29 (84)	27 (81)	27 (81)	28 (82)
Mean daily minimum °C (°F)	20 (68)	20 (68)	21 (70)	20 (68)	21 (70)	20 (68)	21 (70)	22 (72)	23 (73)	23 (73)	21 (70)	21 (70)	21 (70)
Average rainfall mm (inches)	162 (6.4)	156 (6.1)	90 (3.5)	60 (2.4)	144 (5.7)	201 (7.9)	159 (6.3)	108 (4.3)	111 (4.4)	237 (9.3)	276 (10.9)	171 (6.7)	1,875 (73.9)
Average rainy days	14	12	11	11	16	19	16	14	16	18	18	15	180
Source: World Weather Online (modeled/calculated data, not measured locally)

== Demographics ==
Population Census of Santiago

Year	Pop.	±% p.a.
1918	5,596	—
1939	34,154	+9.00%
1948	22,550	−4.51%
1960	39,440	+4.77%
1970	49,688	+2.33%
1975	59,247	+3.59%
1980	69,877	+3.35%
1990	90,787	+2.65%

Year	Pop.	±% p.a.
1995	98,542	+1.55%
2000	110,531	+2.49%
2007	126,244	+1.85%
2010	132,804	+1.86%
2015	134,830	+0.29%
2020	148,580	+2.06%
2024	150,313	+0.28%

Source: Philippine Statistics Authority

=== Religion ===
The dominant religion in the city is Roman Catholic (Saint James the Apostle Parish in Barangay Centro West and Saint Francis of Assisi Parish in Barangay Rizal). However, other Christian sectors are also present in Santiago such as Iglesia ni Cristo, United Methodist Church, Pentecostal Missionary Church of Christ (4th Watch), Jesus is Lord Church, Christ the Rock Church and the Church of Jesus Christ of Latter-day Saints. Being a district full of different cultures, such as Indians, Muslims, and Chinese, several religious groups have also opened their places of worship to the public, such as the Chinese Temple, the Muslim Mosque and the Gurudwara Jagat Sudhar Indian Sikh Temple.

== Economy ==
Home of several business enterprises, banking institutions, educational entities, as well as manufacturing companies, Santiago is considered the Commercial and Trading Center of Cagayan Valley and tagged as the Investment Hub of the North.

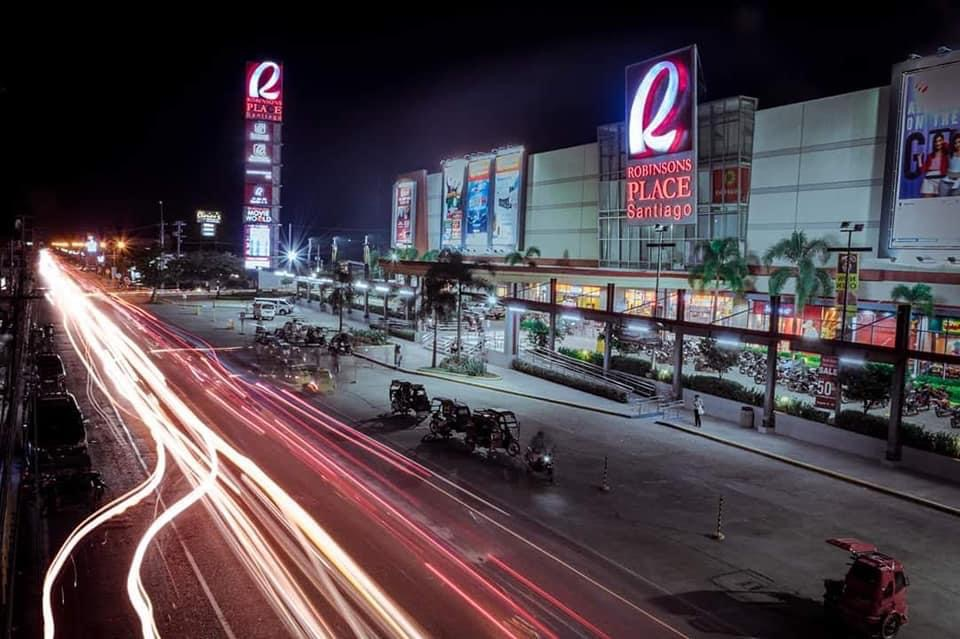
Robinsons Place Santiago as of May 2020

Robinsons Land Corporation launched Robinsons Place Santiago as its pioneer mall in Cagayan Valley. Vista Land and Lifescapes, Inc. built its first horizontal subdivision in the Valley with Camella Isabela Communities, Inc. In 2013, it launched another project named Camella Santiago. In 2018, Camella Santiago expanded and named as Camella Santiago Trails. It is building its banner mall in the Cagayan Valley Region, the Vista Mall Santiago. Another multi-national real estate developer will soon be built its prime subdivision, Primeworld Suburb, owned by Primeworld land holdings Company.

The head-office of Grupo Marilens, the largest homegrown corporation in the region, is in Santiago. Aljay, an agri-chemical company, has a presence in the city and has a manufacturing plant for agrichemical, fertilizer and feeds supply for poultry and piggery and the only manufacturing plant for fertilizers and agrichemicals in the region.

Three of the biggest TV networks in the country (i.e. ABS-CBN, GMA7, TV5) stationed their regional networks and relay stations in the city. San Miguel Corp., Pepsi Cola, Purefoods, Digitel and PLDT also operate in the city.

Poverty incidence of Santiago (%)

Source: Philippine Statistics Authority

Santiago houses some of the biggest hospitals in the region. De Vera's Medical Center, Callang General Hospital and Medical Center and Santiago Adventist Hospital are private hospitals. The Southern Isabela Medical Center is the biggest public hospital while Flores Memorial Hospital and Medical Center is the oldest in the city. Santiago also has Renmar Specialists' Hospital, which is a specialty hospital for complicated cases of pulmonology and orthopedics. Santiago Medical City is the latest addition. The city's location is key to the growth of smaller hospitals like Renmar Hospital and Corado Hospital.

Based on the 2016 City Competitiveness Index, Santiago is the fastest growing local economy in the entire Philippines and is now ranked 51 in terms of economy size among all cities in the country.

Despite rapid industrialization, agriculture is still the main source of livelihood. The main crops are rice, corn, and high-value fruits and vegetables. The city is where imposing grain stations can be found. Rice mills abound. It is the pivotal place for crops where harvests from Ifugao, Kalinga, Quirino, Nueva Vizcaya, and parts of Isabela are transported either to Nueva Ecija, Bulacan, Pangasinan or Batangas. In addition to the city's product is muscovado sugar which the local government has been promoting for export.

== Government ==
=== Local government ===
As an independent component city in the Province of Isabela, government officials of Isabela are not voted by the city. Unlike most other towns in the province, the provincial government has no political jurisdiction over local transactions of the city government. Residents of this city are not allowed to run in the provincial level except for congressional representation, where Santiago City is part of Isabela's 4th congressional district.

The City of Santiago is governed by a mayor-council system. There are ten city councilors. The council is the official governing body of the city, also known as the Sangguniang Panlungsod. The council agenda is presided over by the city vice mayor.

Barangays are also headed by elected officials: Barangay Captain, Barangay Council, whose members are called Barangay Councilors. The barangays have SK federation which represents the barangay, headed by SK chairperson and whose members are called SK councilors. All officials in the city are elected every three years.

=== Elected officials ===
Members of the Santiago City Council (2022–2025)
Position	Name
District Representative (4th Legislative District the Province of Isabela)	Joseph S. Tan
Chief Executive of the City of Santiago	Mayor Alyssa Sheena T. Dy
Presiding Officer of the City Council of Santiago	Vice Mayor Alvin N. Abaya
Councilors of the City of Santiago	Arlene Jane Alvarez-Reyes
Councilors of the City of Santiago	Paul C. De Jesus
Councilors of the City of Santiago	Resureccion Turingan-Ponce
Councilors of the City of Santiago	Cassandra Eunice Sable
Councilors of the City of Santiago	Katrina Camille B. Bautista
Councilors of the City of Santiago	Jamayne C. Tan
Councilors of the City of Santiago	Nicoline Shane A. Miranda
Councilors of the City of Santiago	Orlando T. Chan
Councilors of the City of Santiago	Marcelino Cabucana Jr.
Councilors of the City of Santiago	Sherman A. Miguel

=== Congress representation ===
Santiago is represented in the Philippine Congress as part of Isabela's 4th legislative district. Currently, Joseph S. Tan is the city's representative.

== Culture and tourism ==
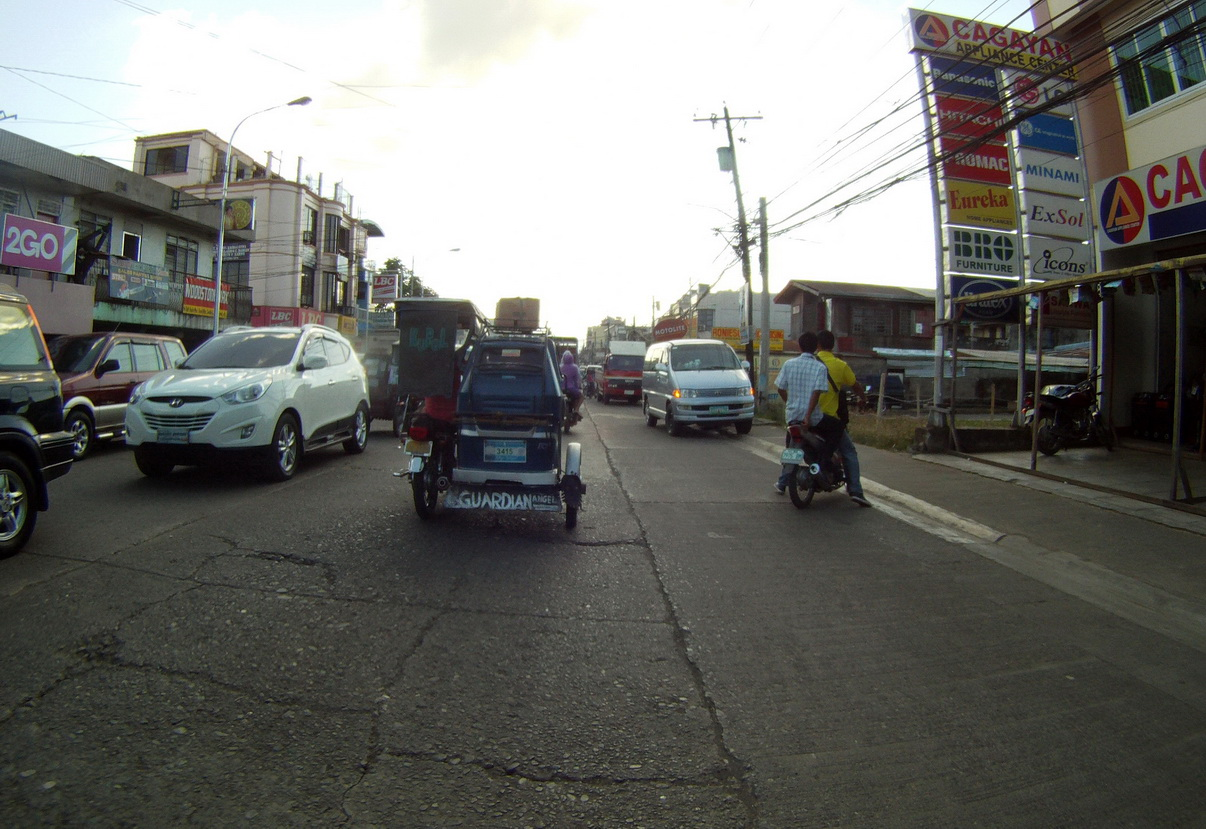
Town center

The majority of the population speaks Tagalog and Ilocano. English is the medium of instruction in schools and is generally understood and spoken especially in the business community.

Tourism is a new industry in the city. Serving as the jump-off point in northeastern Luzon for tourists, many landmarks are developed. Tourist spots near Santiago are Quirino Province, Magat Dam in Isabela, Banaue Rice Terraces in Ifugao, and white sand beaches in Aurora Province facing the Pacific Ocean.

=== Festivals ===
- Balamban Dance Festival (formerly known as Balamban Butterfly Festival) - In the year 2014, a new festival was conceptualized by the city government to celebrate Santiago's cityhood. Balamban which means butterfly is a cultural dance of lowland Christians that originated in Santiago. The dance depicts the graceful movement and fluttering of butterflies that throng Dariuk Hills' scented gardens. It is usually danced during wedding celebrations in Santiago.
- Pattaradday Festival - From 2006 to 2013, Santiago's cityhood anniversary was celebrated through Pattaradday, a concept owned by a private organization called Pattaradday Foundation Inc. Pattaradday means unity in Ibanag. Ibanags are historically said to be the first settlers of the locality. It celebrated the unity of the ethno-linguistic groups that have merged in the city to make it the melting pot of culture of Region II. The festival won Hall of Fame in the Search for Best Tourism Event in the Philippines conducted by the Association of Tourism Officers of the Philippines. It featured different festivities participated in by many street dances from all over the country.
- "Redireksyon" thru the initiative of former City Mayor Jose "Pempe" C. Miranda
- Feast of Saint James (Santiago de Carig) - Celebrated every July 25 of the year is the Feast of Saint James the Apostle, the Patron Saint of the city. It features the life history of the patron saint as it saves the Christians against the Moros (based on the Battle of Clavijo which, Saint James the Apostle appeared as "Santiago Matamoros" or Saint James the Moor-Killer) through zarzuela and the "Grand Batalla" (Grand Battle) or the Moro-Moro, a dance choreography depicting the battle.

== Infrastructure ==
Santiago is the gateway to the plains of Cagayan Valley. It connects several provinces with the following major roads crossing the city:

- Pan-Philippine Highway
- Santiago - Tuguegarao Road
- Santiago - Saguday Road
- Santiago - Diffun Road (Patul Road)
- Santiago Bypass Road (Sinsayon to Rizal)
- Santiago Bypass Road (Rizal to Divisoria)
- Santiago Bypass Road (Sinsayon to Baluarte; on going)
- Santiago Bypass Road (Baluarte to Divisoria; planned)
- Santiago City Road
- Alvarez Boulevard

Serving as a bridge to the region's provincial network, numerous bus terminals are present in the city. These include Victory Liner, Northeast Luzon Bus Line (formerly Nelbusco), GV Florida Transport, Five Star Bus Company, EMC LBS bus lines, GMW Trans among others.

The Integrated Transport Terminal and Commercial Complex has also been established to cater for all public utility jeepneys, buses, and vans that operate from nearby provinces and localities to the city.

== Education ==
Notable school institutions located in the city are the School of Saint James the Apostle (formerly La Salette Elementary School), Santiago Cultural Institute (Chinese School), Children First School, Infant Jesus Montessori School, AMA Computer College Santiago City Campus, TAPS, Patria Sable Corpus College, University of La Salette and Northeastern College, one of the oldest schools in the region. The Southern Isabela College of Arts and Trades is the biggest vocational school operating in the city. Also, there are numerous international schools operating in the city.

The Schools Division Office of Santiago City governs the city's public education system. The division office is a field office of the DepEd in Cagayan Valley region. The office governs the public elementary and public high schools throughout the city. Currently, the city has three school districts: Santiago East, Santiago North, and Santiago West.

== Media ==
These are radio and TV stations that are available in the city. Some stations may not be in operation.

=== AM Radio ===
- 828 kHz DZRH Nationwide (DWRH; Manila Broadcasting Company) (repeater)
- DWSI 864 Sonshine Radio Santiago (DWSI; Sonshine Media Network International
- 1143 DZMR Missions Radio (DZMR; Far East Broadcasting Company)
- DWEY 1179 Life Radio Santiago (DWET; End-Time Mission Broadcasting Service)

=== FM Radio ===
- 92.9 Brigada News FM Cauayan (DWYI; Brigada Mass Media Corporation) (Served and the airwaves of Cauayan, Isabela and expanded areas)
- 93.7 Radyo Natin Santiago (DWTR; Manila Broadcasting Company/Radyo Natin Network)
- 94.5 MHz Love Radio Santiago (DWIP; Manila Broadcasting Company)
- 96.9 Big Radio (Rajah Broadcasting Network) (Soon to Air)
- 97.7 Sweet Radio (DWMX; Soundstream Broadcasting Corporation/Catholic Media Network)
- 100.1 MHz DWIZ Isabela (Own operated by Aliw Broadcasting Corporation and Barangay Rizal LPFM)
- 102.1 Radio Maria Isabela (DZRC; Radio Maria Philippines/Catholic Media Network) (repeater)
- 104.9 XFM (Palawan Broadcasting Corporation/Yes2Health Advertising, Inc.)
- 106.7 MHz Radio Adventist Hospital
- 107.9 MHz Taps Radio

=== Television ===
List of television stations that are in operation in the city. Some stations may no longer in operation.

- (PA) Channel 2/DTT-16 - All TV (Advanced Media Broadcasting System; formerly ABS-CBN Corporation)
- DWLE Channel 7/DTT-15 - GMA (GMA Network, Inc.)
- DWDH Channel 22/DTT-18 - TV5 (Mediascape, Inc., affiliate)

==== Defunct ====
- DWWA Channel 23 - S+A (AMCARA Broadcasting Network, Inc.)
- DWSA Channel 37 - SMNI (Swara Sug Media Corporation)

=== Cable and Satellite TV ===
- Regal Cable TV Network
- New City Cable System
- Cignal TV
- G Sat

== Notable personalities ==
=== Entertainment ===
- Sheena Mae Catacutan, member of Pinoy pop group Bini and former Pinoy Big Brother: Otso housemate.
- 4th Impact (formerly 4th Power, Cercado Sisters, Gollayan Sisters, and MICA), girl group consisting of sisters Almira, Irene, Mylene and Celina Cercado.
- Peter Musñgi, voice-over artist for Intercontinental Broadcasting Corporation (early 1980s–1987), Banahaw Broadcasting Corporation (1984–1986), ABS-CBN (1987–2020), Star Cinema (1993–present), Kapamilya Channel and Kapamilya Online Live (2020–present).
- Karina Bautista, actress and former Pinoy Big Brother: Otso housemate.
- Zig Dulay, film director.

=== Military ===
- Florence Finch, Filipino-American member of the World War II resistance against the Japanese occupation of the Philippines.

=== Politics ===
- Heherson Alvarez, politician and Senator.

== Sister cities ==
=== Local ===
- (Philippines) Ilagan, Isabela
- (Philippines) Makati
- (Philippines) Marikina
- (Philippines) Puerto Princesa
